= Southwestern Athletic Conference Men's Basketball Player of the Year =

Annual award

- Awarded for: the most outstanding basketball player in the Southwestern Athletic Conference
- Country: United States

History
- Most recent: Sterling Young, Florida A&M

Historical records of this award have been spotty, (Note: Please see the talk page for an e-mail correspondence with Tom Galbraith, who at the time of the exchanges was the SWAC men's basketball contact.) and the following is a compiled list of the verified SWAC Players of the Year.

The Southwestern Athletic Conference Men's Basketball Player of the Year is an annual award given to the Southwestern Athletic Conference's (SWAC) most outstanding player.

== Key ==
†	Co-Players of the Year
*	Awarded a national player of the year award that same season: Helms Foundation College Basketball Player of the Year (1904–05 to 1978–79); UPI College Basketball Player of the Year (1954–55 to 1995–96); Oscar Robertson Trophy (1958–59 to present); Naismith College Player of the Year (1968–69 to present); John R. Wooden Award (1976–77 to present)
Player (X)	Denotes the number of times the player has been awarded the SWAC Player of the Year award at that point

== Winners ==
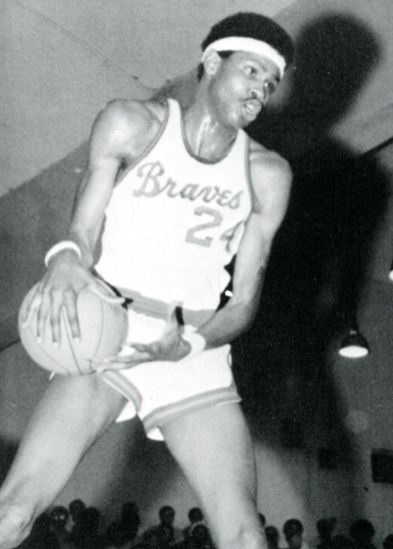
Nathaniel Archibald, Alcorn State, 1973

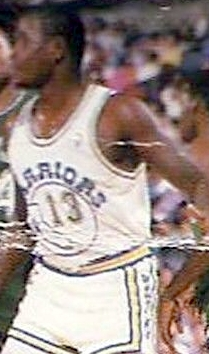
Larry Smith, Alcorn State, 1979 and 1980

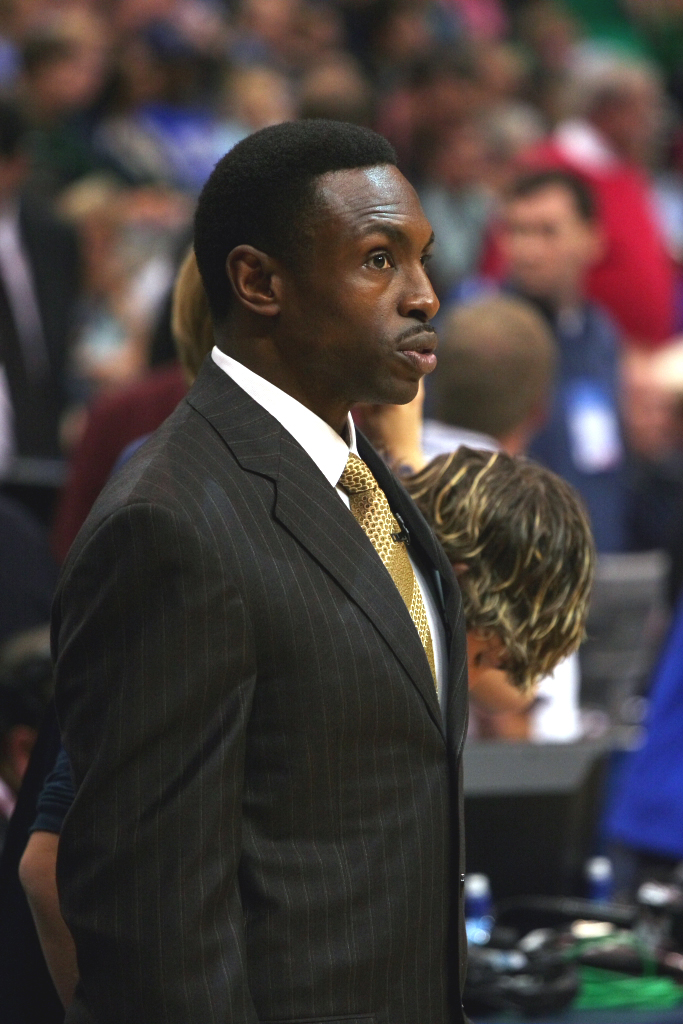
Avery Johnson, Southern, 1987 and 1988

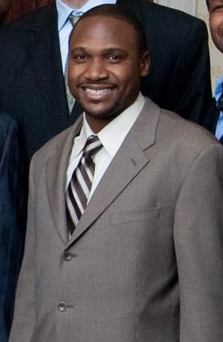
Lindsey Hunter, Jackson State, 1993

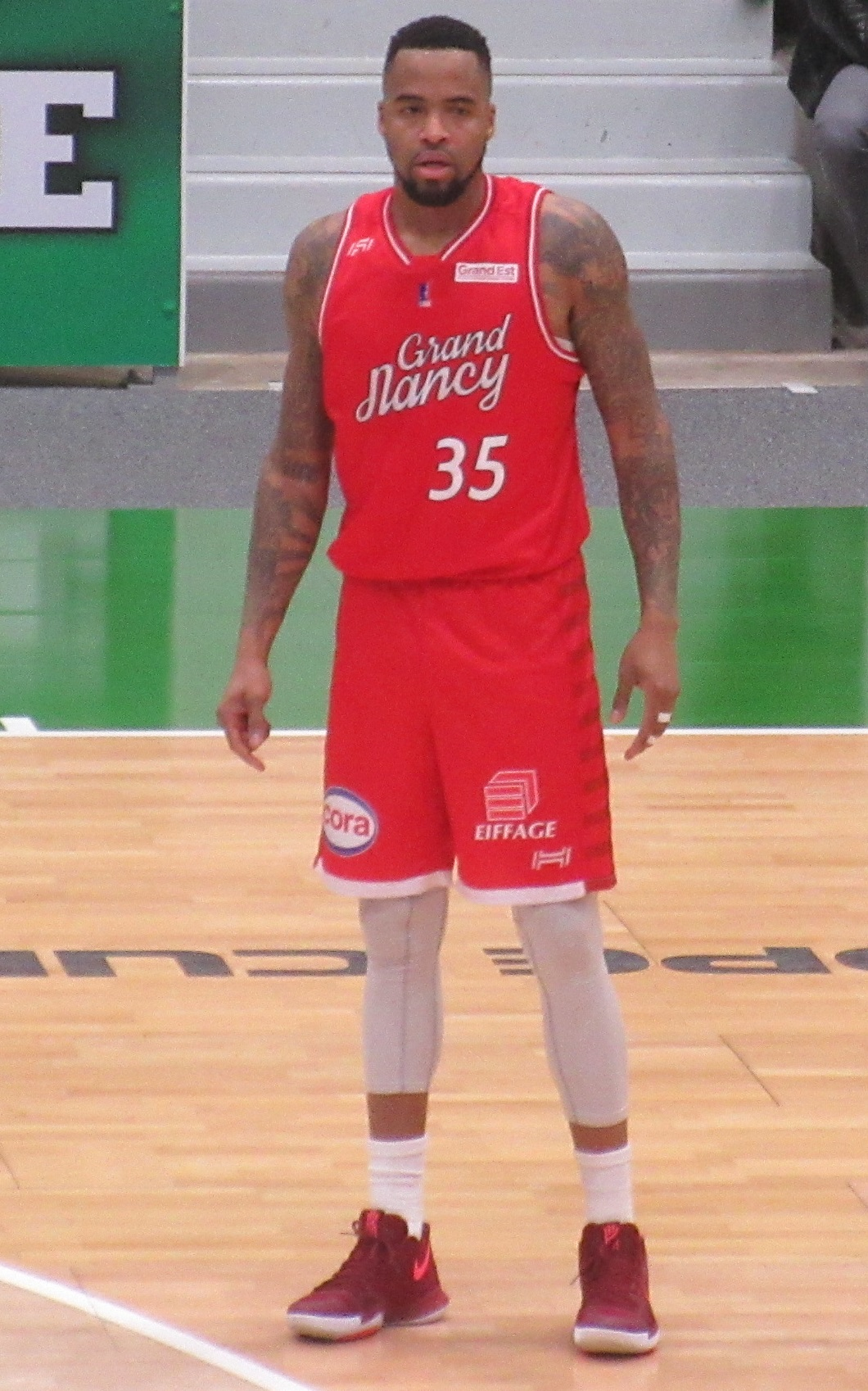
Brion Rush, Grambling State, 2006

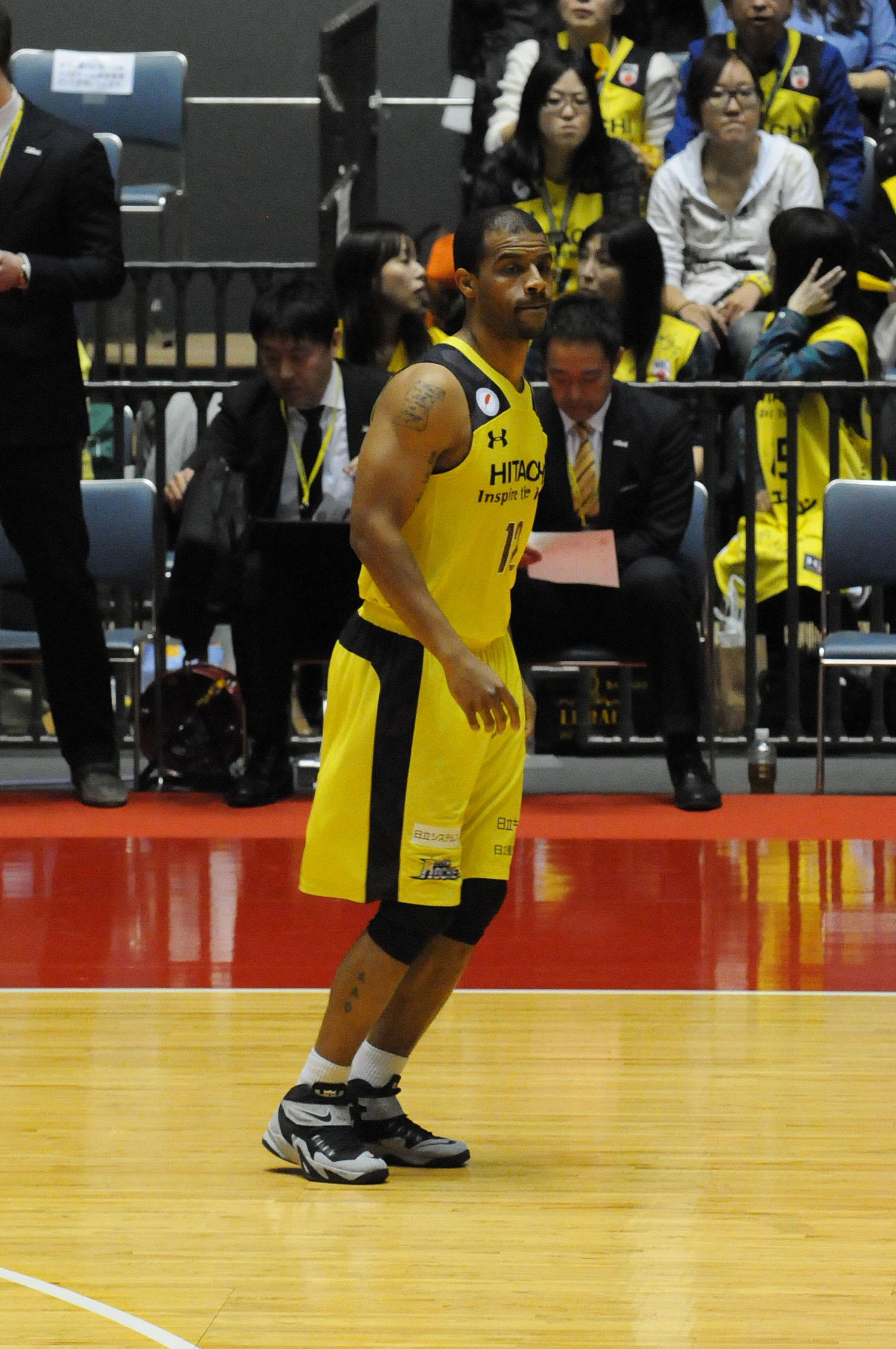
Trey Johnson, Jackson State, 2007

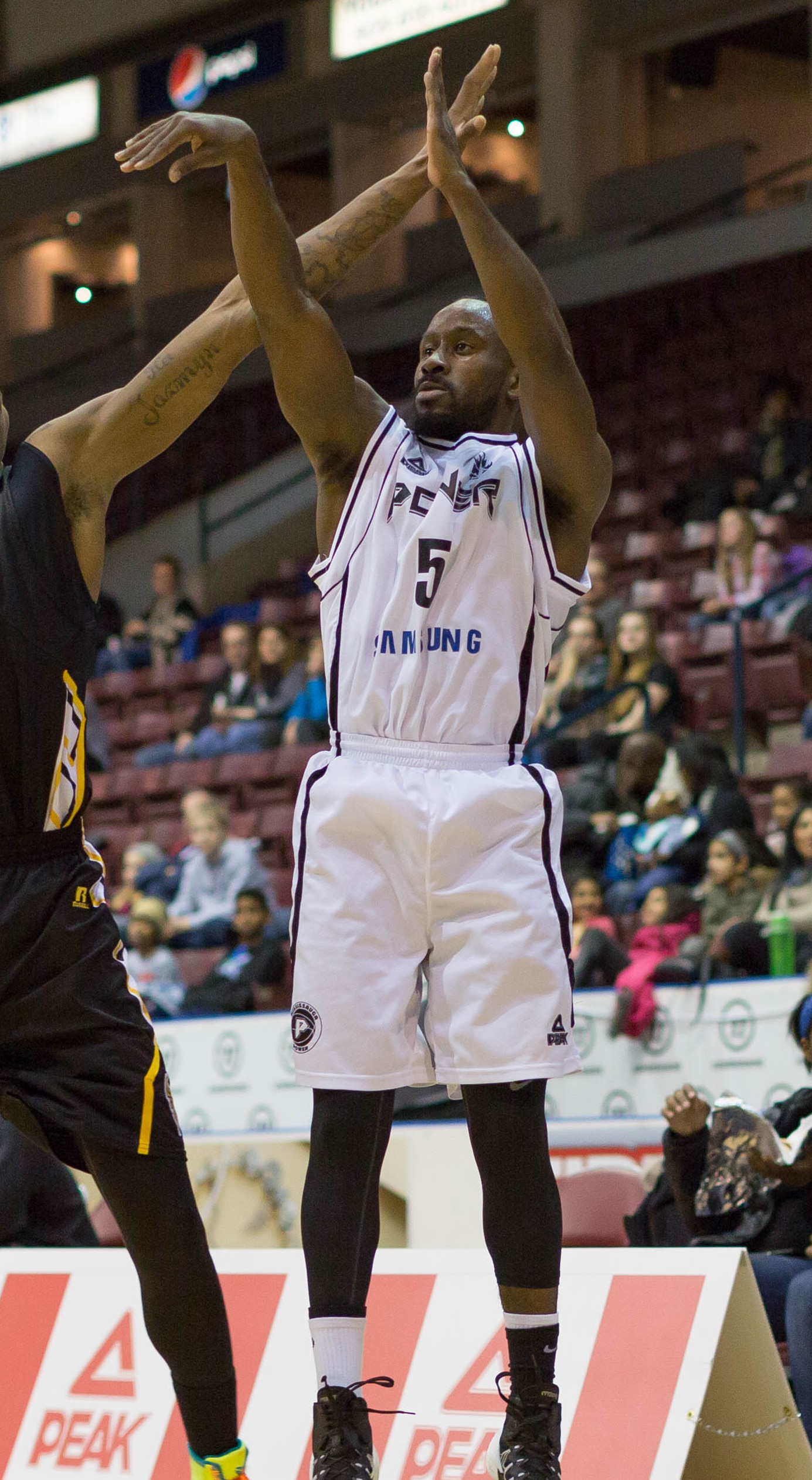
Omar Strong, Texas Southern, 2013

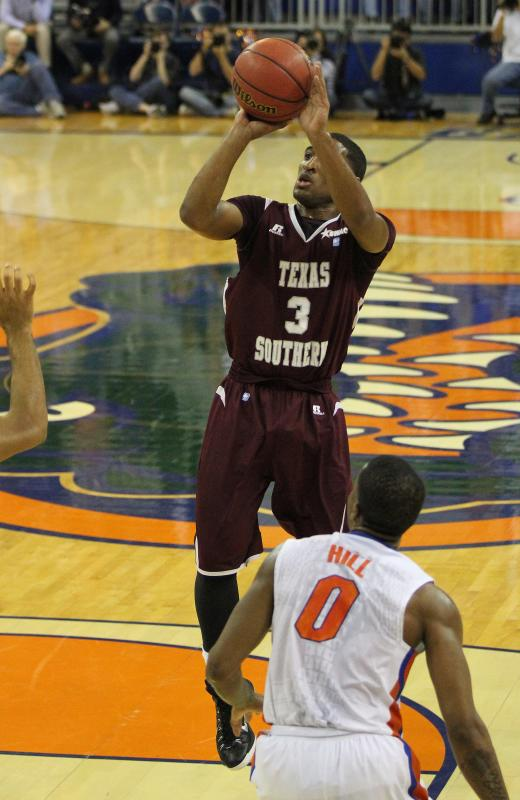
Madarious Gibbs, Texas Southern, 2015

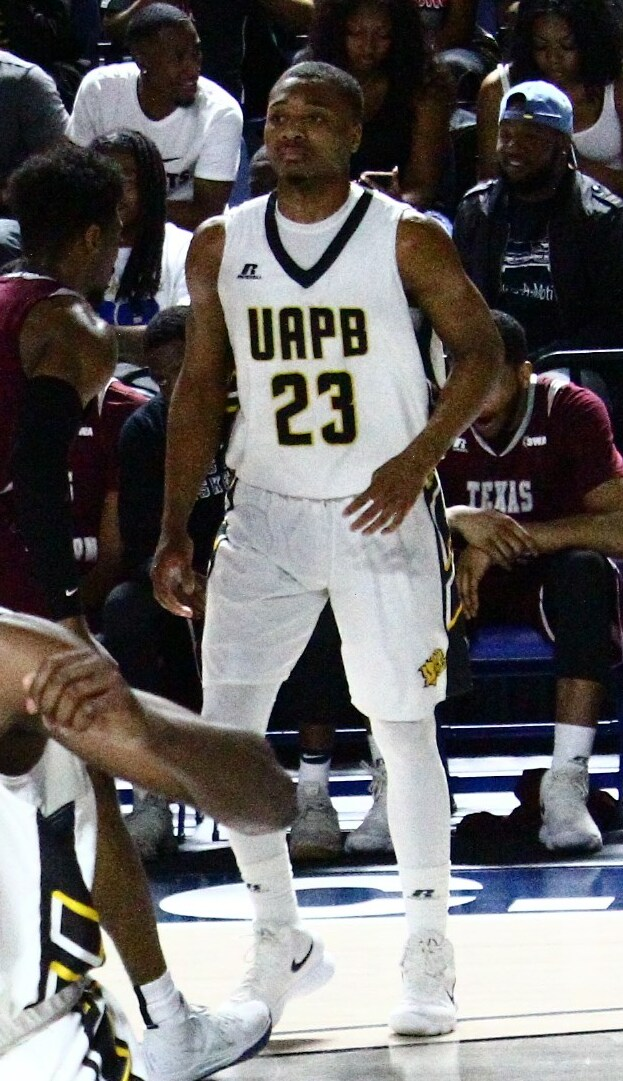
Martaveous McKnight, Arkansas–Pine Bluff, 2018

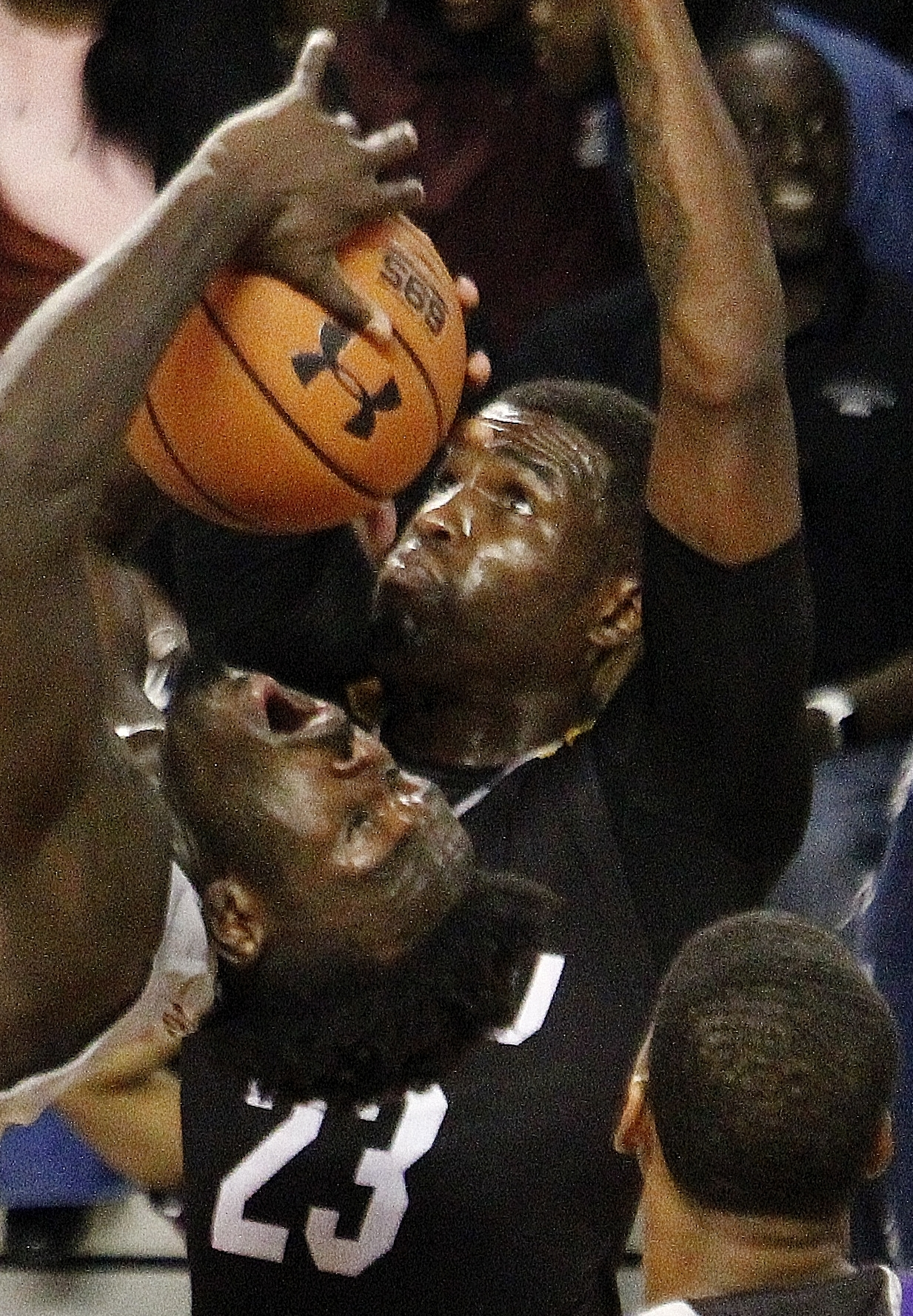
Devonte Patterson, Prairie View A&M, 2020

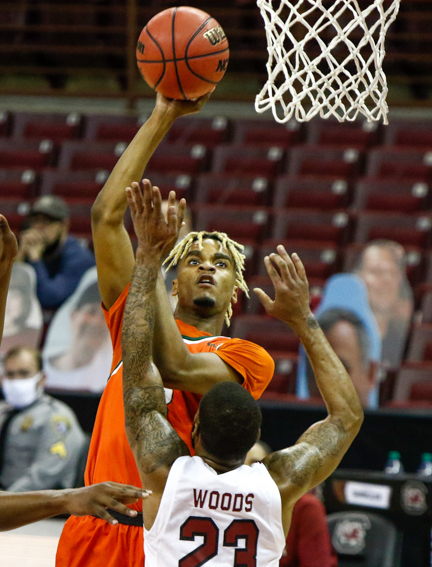
M. J. Randolph, Florida A&M, 2022

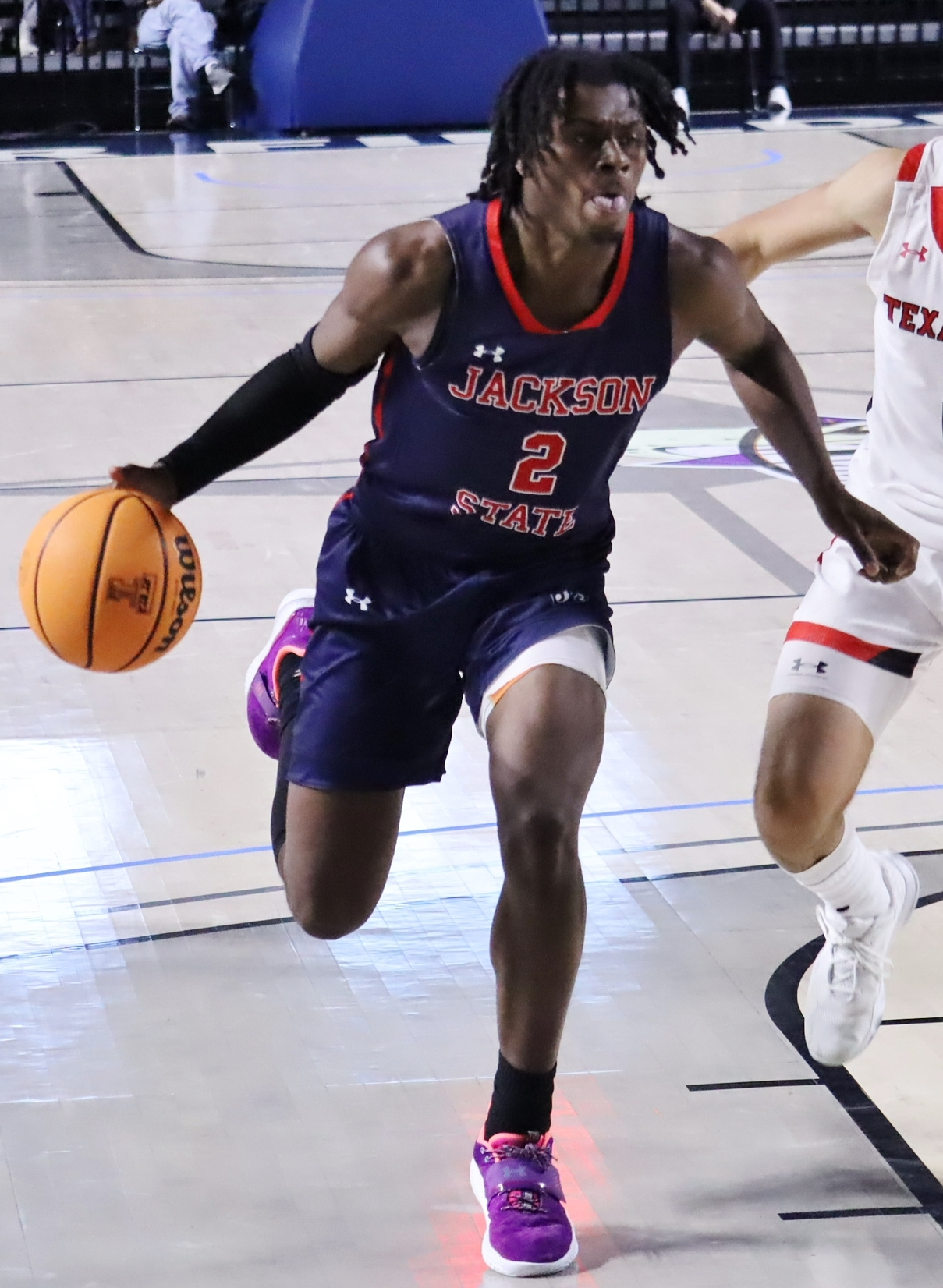
Ken Evans Jr., Jackson State, 2024

Season	Player	School	Position	Class	Reference
1964–65	Bob Love	Southern	SF	Senior	
1969–70	Cornell Warner	Jackson State	C	Junior	
1971–72	Larry McTier	Southern	PG	Senior	
1972–73	Nathaniel Archibald	Alcorn State	C	Junior	
1973–74	Gene Short	Jackson State	SF	Sophomore	
1974–75	Gene Short (2)	Jackson State	SF	Junior	
1975–76	Larry Wright	Grambling State	PG	Junior	
1976–77	Purvis Short	Jackson State	SF	Junior	
1977–78	Purvis Short (2)	Jackson State	SF	Senior	
1978–79	Larry Smith	Alcorn State	PF / C	Junior	
1979–80	Larry Smith (2)	Alcorn State	PF / C	Senior	
1980–81^{†}	Harry Kelly	Texas Southern	SF	Sophomore	
1980–81^{†}	Robert Williams	Grambling State	PF	Senior	
1981–82	Harry Kelly (2)	Texas Southern	SF	Junior	
1982–83	Harry Kelly (3)	Texas Southern	SF	Senior	
1983–84	Lewis Jackson	Alabama State	SF	Senior	
1984–85	Mike Phelps	Alcorn State	PG	Senior	
1985–86	Frank Sillmon	Alabama State	SF	Sophomore	
1986–87	George Ivory	Mississippi Valley State	PG	Senior	
1987–88	Avery Johnson	Southern	PG	Senior	
1988–89	Terry Brooks	Alabama State	G	Senior	
1989–90	Joe Faulkner	Southern	PF	Senior	
1990–91	Steve Rogers	Alabama State	SG	Junior	
1991–92	Steve Rogers (2)	Alabama State	SG	Senior	
1992–93	Lindsey Hunter	Jackson State	PG	Senior	
1993–94	Jervaughn Scales	Southern	PF	Senior	
1994–95	Kenny Sykes	Grambling State	SG	Senior	
1995–96	Marcus Mann	Mississippi Valley State	PF	Senior	
1996–97	Randy Bolden	Texas Southern	PG	Junior	
1997–98	Randy Bolden (2)	Texas Southern	PG	Senior	
1998–99	Adarrial Smylie	Southern	C	Junior	
1999–00	Adarrial Smylie (2)	Southern	C	Senior	
2000–01	Dewayne Jefferson	Mississippi Valley State	SG	Senior	
2001–02	Paul Haynes	Grambling State	PF / C	Sophomore	
2002–03	Gregory Burks	Prairie View A&M	PG	Senior	
2003–04	Attarius Norwood	Mississippi Valley State	F	Senior	
2004–05	Obie Trotter	Alabama A&M	PG / SG	Junior	
2005–06	Brion Rush	Grambling State	PG	Senior	
2006–07	Trey Johnson	Jackson State	SG	Senior	
2007–08	Andrew Hayles	Alabama State	SG	Junior	
2008–09	Brandon Brooks	Alabama State	PG	Senior	
2009–10	Garrison Johnson	Jackson State	SG	Senior	
2010–11	Travele Jones	Texas Southern	PF	Senior	
2011–12	Paul Crosby	Mississippi Valley State	C	Senior	
2012–13	Omar Strong	Texas Southern	PG	Senior	
2013–14	Aaric Murray	Texas Southern	C	Senior	
2014–15	Madarious Gibbs	Texas Southern	PG	Senior	
2015–16	Derrick Griffin	Texas Southern	C	Freshman	
2016–17	Zach Lofton	Texas Southern	SG	Junior	
2017–18	Martaveous McKnight	Arkansas–Pine Bluff	PG	Junior	
2018–19	Jeremy Combs	Texas Southern	PF	Senior	
2019–20	Devonte Patterson	Prairie View A&M	PF	Senior	
2020–21	Tristan Jarrett	Jackson State	SG	Senior	
2021–22	M. J. Randolph	Florida A&M	PG	Senior	
2022–23	Cameron Christon	Grambling State	SG	Graduate	
2023–24	Ken Evans Jr.	Jackson State	SG / PG	Junior	
2024–25	Sterling Young	Florida A&M	SG	Senior	
2025–26	Daeshun Ruffin	Jackson State	PG	Senior	

== Winners by school ==
School (year joined)	Winners	Years
Texas Southern (1954)	12	1981^{†}, 1982, 1983, 1997, 1998, 2011, 2013, 2014, 2015, 2016, 2017, 2019
Jackson State (1958)	11	1970, 1974, 1975, 1977, 1978, 1993, 2007, 2010, 2021, 2024, 2026
Alabama State (1982)	7	1984, 1986, 1989, 1991, 1992, 2008, 2009
Southern (1934)	7	1965, 1972, 1988, 1990, 1994, 1999, 2000
Grambling State (1958)	6	1976, 1981^{†}, 1995, 2002, 2006, 2023
Mississippi Valley State (1968)	5	1987, 1996, 2001, 2004, 2012
Alcorn State (1962)	4	1973, 1979, 1980, 1985
Florida A&M (2021)	2	2022, 2025
Prairie View A&M (1920)	2	2003, 2020
Alabama A&M (1999)	1	2005
Arkansas–Pine Bluff (1936) (Note: The University of Arkansas at Pine Bluff was a conference member from 1936 to 1970, left, but then re-joined in 1998.)	1	2018
Bethune–Cookman (2021)	0	—
