= Joe Faulkner =

American former basketball player

Personal information
- Born: c. 1969
- Listed height: 6 ft 4 in (1.93 m)

Career information
- College: Southern (1986–1990)
- NBA draft: 1990: undrafted
- Position: Power forward

Career highlights
- SWAC Player of the Year (1990); First Team All-SWAC (1990)

Joseph Faulkner (born c. 1969) is an American former basketball player. He played briefly in the Continental Basketball Association (CBA) but is best known for his collegiate career at Southern University between 1986–87 and 1989–90.

Faulkner scored well over 1,000 career points at Southern and helped guide the Jaguars to three consecutive NCAA Tournament appearances from 1987 through 1989 and a National Invitation Tournament appearance in 1990. He averaged 16.6 points per game his freshman season but his most lauded season came in his senior year. That season, despite only qualifying for the NIT after three straight NCAA Tournament trips, Faulkner led the Southwestern Athletic Conference (SWAC) in both scoring and rebounding. He averaged 21.7 points and 9.3 rebounds per game en route to being named the SWAC Player of the Year.
