= Steve Rogers (basketball) =

American basketball player and coach (born 1968)

Personal information
- Born: July 30, 1968 (age 58) Montgomery, Alabama, U.S.
- Listed height: 6 ft 5 in (1.96 m)
- Listed weight: 190 lb (86 kg)

Career information
- High school: Lanier (Montgomery, Alabama)
- College: Middle Tennessee (1987–1988); Alabama State (1989–1992)
- NBA draft: 1992: 2nd round, 40th overall pick
- Drafted by: New Jersey Nets
- Playing career: 1992–2003
- Position: Shooting guard
- Coaching career: 2005–present

Career history

Playing
- 1992–1993: Peiraikos Syndesmos
- 1993–1994: Boca Juniors
- 1994–2000: Tofaş S.K.
- 2000–2001: Darüşşafaka S.K.
- 2001–2002: Strasbourg IG
- 2001–2002: Śląsk Wrocław
- 2002: Mens Sana Basket
- 2002–2003: Türk Telekom B.K.

Coaching
- 2005–2020: Alabama State (assistant)
- 2020–2022: Prattville HS
- 2023–2025: Booker T. Washington HS
- 2025–Present: Central HS

Career highlights
- 2× SWAC Player of the Year (1991, 1992); 3× First-team All-SWAC (1990–1992); SWAC Newcomer of the Year (1990)
- Stats at Basketball Reference

Steven Maurice Rogers (born July 30, 1968) is an American former professional basketball player and current high school basketball coach.

A 6'5" and 190 lb shooting guard, Rogers played his freshman year of college basketball at Middle Tennessee State before transferring to Alabama State for his sophomore, junior and senior seasons.

He was selected by the New Jersey Nets in the second round (40th pick overall) of the 1992 NBA draft, though he never played in a regular season game for the Nets. He played overseas in Europe and South America before returning to Alabama State, where he has worked as their director of football operations and as an assistant basketball coach. In May 2020, Rogers was named head boys basketball coach of the Prattville High School Lions.

In 2025, Rogers was named the head coach of the Central High School Red Devils in Phenix City after serving as the head coach of Booker T. Washington High School in Tuskegee from 2023 to 2025.

== Personal life ==
Rogers is a member of Kappa Alpha Psi fraternity.

== See also ==
- List of NCAA Division I men's basketball career free throw scoring leaders
