= Nathaniel Archibald =

Nathaniel Archibald may refer to:

- Nathaniel Archibald (basketball, born 1952) (1952–2018), American college basketball player at Alcorn State
- Nate Archibald (born 1948), American professional basketball player inducted into Naismith Memorial Basketball Hall of Fame
- Nate Archibald (Gossip Girl), fictional character in the best-selling book series
