= Frank Walker (American football) =

American football player (born 1981)

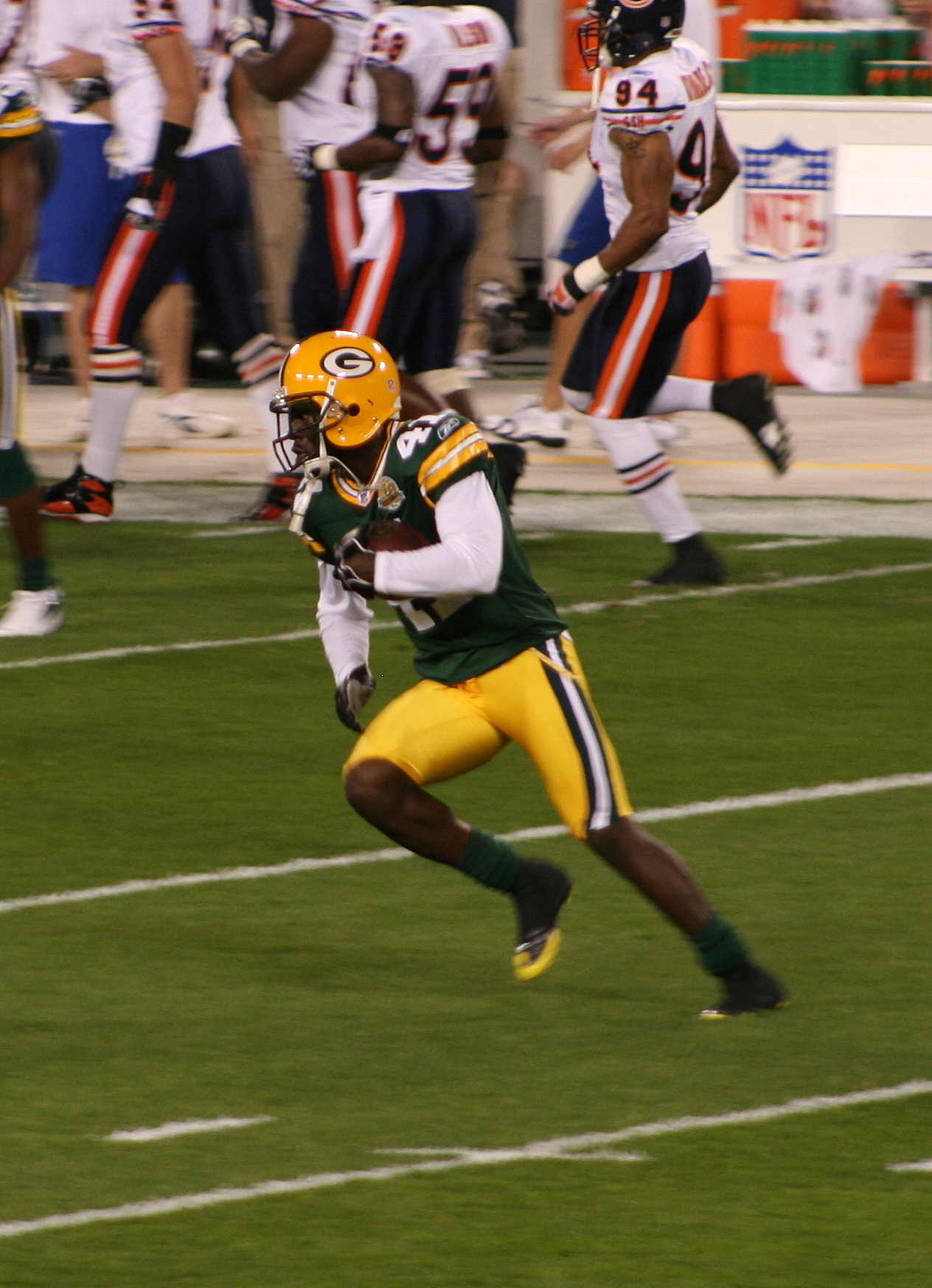
- Walker with the Green Bay Packers in 2007

No. 41, 25
- Position: Cornerback

Personal information
- Born: August 6, 1981 (age 45); Tuskegee, Alabama, U.S.
- Listed height: 5 ft 11 in (1.80 m)
- Listed weight: 196 lb (89 kg)

Career information
- High school: Booker T. Washington (Tuskegee)
- College: Tuskegee
- NFL draft: 2003: 6th round, 207th overall pick

Career history
- New York Giants (2003–2006); Green Bay Packers (2007); Baltimore Ravens (2008–2009); Minnesota Vikings (2010); Tennessee Titans (2011)*; Dallas Cowboys (2011)
- * Offseason or practice squad member only

Awards and highlights
- Little All-America team (2002); All-SIAC (2002); Second-team All-SIAC (2000)

Career NFL statistics
- Total tackles: 186
- Forced fumbles: 3
- Fumble recoveries: 2
- Pass deflections: 34
- Interceptions: 9
- Defensive touchdowns: 1
- Stats at Pro Football Reference

Frank Bernard Walker (born August 6, 1981) is an American former professional football player who was a cornerback in the National Football League (NFL) for the New York Giants, Green Bay Packers, Baltimore Ravens, Minnesota Vikings and Dallas Cowboys. He was selected by the Giants in the sixth round of the 2003 NFL draft. He played college football for the Tuskegee Golden Tigers.

== Early life ==
Walker attended Booker T. Washington High School, where he practiced football, baseball and track. As a senior, he played running back in six games, rushing for 948 yards and 12 touchdowns. He finished third in the state in the 100-yard dash.

Walker accepted a football scholarship from Tuskegee University. As a freshman, he appeared in nine games playing mostly on special teams. As a junior, he appeared in nine games, playing right cornerback opposite Drayton Florence. He also was employed as a nickel back.

He contributed to the school winning 3 consecutive SIAC Football Championships (2000–2002). He finished his college career with 92 tackles (64 solo), 2 sacks, 6 tackles for loss, 6 interceptions and 34 passes defensed. In 2013, his jersey number was retired by Tuskegee University. In 2024, he was inducted to the SIAC Hall of Fame in Atlanta.

== Professional career ==
=== New York Giants ===
Walker was selected by the New York Giants in the sixth round (207th overall) of the 2003 NFL draft. As a rookie, he played in ten games, recording 74 tackles and 2 interceptions. He made his NFL debut on October 26 against the Minnesota Vikings.

In 2004, he appeared in 13 games, missing the first 3 with a broken sesamoid bone. He had one start at right cornerback against the Cincinnati Bengals. He posted 12 tackles, 2 interceptions, 3 passes defensed, 7 special teams tackles and one forced fumble.

In 2005, he appeared in 7 games and was inactive for 7 contests, including the last 5 of the season. He suited up but did not play in 2 games. He registered one interception and 2 special teams tackles.

In 2006, he appeared in 11 games, with one start against the Tennessee Titans. He recorded 8 tackles (5 solo) and 2 special teams tackles.

=== Green Bay Packers ===
On March 13, 2007, he signed with the Green Bay Packers as a free agent. Despite being brought in to be the third cornerback on the depth chart, Walker played a reduced role with the Packers during their 13–3 regular season run to their eventual loss to the New York Giants in the 2007 NFC Championship Game.

He appeared in 12 games, playing as the nickel and dime back, while tallying 10 tackles (9 solo), one pass defensed and 12 special teams tackles. On October 18, he had arthroscopic knee surgery and was forced to miss 4 games. After his one-year deal expired, he chose not to re sign with the Packers due to his lack of playing time.

=== Baltimore Ravens ===
On March 14, 2008, Walker was signed by the Baltimore Ravens to compete for the team's third cornerback position. He appeared in 15 games with 5 starts, tallying 33 tackles, one interception, 14 passes defensed, 2 special teams tackles and 2 forced fumbles. He was part of the NFL's second-ranked defense.

In December, Walker was accused of spitting in the mouth of Pittsburgh Steelers punter/holder Mitch Berger after Jeff Reed kicked an extra point in Pittsburgh's 13–9 win. He appeared to have tried to dive into Reed's knees. A brief scuffle ensued. Berger apparently tried to break it up. At that point the spitting was supposed to have occurred. Walker denied the incident being intentional.

In 2009, he appeared in 14 games with one start against the Indianapolis Colts. He struggled with penalties during the season. He registered 14 tackles and one interception.

=== Minnesota Vikings ===
On October 13, 2010, Walker signed with the Minnesota Vikings, after Cedric Griffin was lost for the season with a right knee injury. He appeared in 11 games with 2 starts against the New York Giants and Detroit Lions. He registered 17 tackles, one interception, five passes defensed and 7 special teams tackles. He was not re-signed after the season.

=== Tennessee Titans ===
On August 4, 2011, Walker signed with the Tennessee Titans to replace an injured Ryan Mouton. He was released on September 3.

=== Dallas Cowboys ===
On September 13, 2011, he was signed as a free agent by the Dallas Cowboys, reuniting with head coach Jason Garrett, who was a former teammate with the Giants. He played in 14 games as a backup, making 25 tackles and one interception. He was not re-signed after the season.

== NFL career statistics ==
Legend
**Bold**	Career high

=== Regular season ===
Year	Team	Games		Tackles					Interceptions					Fumbles			
Year	Team	GP	GS	Cmb	Solo	Ast	Sck	TFL	Int	Yds	TD	Lng	PD	FF	FR	Yds	TD
2003	NYG	10	**7**	34	30	4	0.0	0	**2**	**74**	**1**	56	5	0	0	0	0
2004	NYG	13	1	23	21	2	0.0	0	**2**	20	0	10	3	1	0	0	0
2005	NYG	7	0	1	1	0	0.0	0	1	71	0	**71**	1	0	0	0	0
2006	NYG	11	1	13	10	3	0.0	**1**	0	0	0	0	0	0	0	0	0
2007	GNB	12	0	17	17	0	0.0	0	0	0	0	0	1	0	0	0	0
2008	BAL	**15**	5	**35**	**31**	4	0.0	0	1	0	0	0	**11**	**2**	0	0	0
2009	BAL	14	1	16	12	4	0.0	0	1	0	0	0	4	0	**1**	0	0
2010	MIN	11	2	22	13	**9**	0.0	0	1	10	0	10	6	0	**1**	0	0
2011	DAL	14	0	25	17	8	0.0	**1**	1	5	0	5	3	0	0	0	0
		107	17	186	152	34	0.0	2	9	180	1	71	34	3	2	0	0

=== Playoffs ===
Year	Team	Games		Tackles					Interceptions					Fumbles			
Year	Team	GP	GS	Cmb	Solo	Ast	Sck	TFL	Int	Yds	TD	Lng	PD	FF	FR	Yds	TD
2007	GNB	1	0	1	1	0	0.0	0	0	0	0	0	0	0	0	0	0
2008	BAL	**3**	**1**	**6**	**6**	0	0.0	0	0	0	0	0	**2**	0	0	0	0
2009	BAL	2	**1**	5	3	**2**	0.0	0	0	0	0	0	**2**	0	0	0	0
		6	2	12	10	2	0.0	0	0	0	0	0	4	0	0	0	0

== Personal life ==
His cousin Chad Lucas played wide receiver in the NFL.
