= Jervaughn Scales =

American-Argentinian basketball player (born 1971)

Personal information
- Born: August 11, 1971 (age 55) New York
- Listed height: 6 ft 6 in (1.98 m)
- Listed weight: 223 lb (101 kg)

Career information
- High school: Colonel White (Dayton, Ohio)
- College: Southern (1991–1994)
- NBA draft: 1994: undrafted
- Playing career: 1994–2015
- Position: Power forward

Career history
- 1994–1995: Oostende
- 1995: Regensdorf
- 1995: Canberra Cannons
- 1995–1996: Monzon
- 1996–1997: Algeciras
- 1997: Hapoel Tel Aviv
- 1997–1999: Wetzikon
- 1999: Canberra Cannons
- 1999: Kansas Cagerz
- 1999–2000: Black Hills Gold
- 2000–2001: Regatas Corrientes
- 2001–2002: Central Entrerriano
- 2002–2007: Gimnasia y Esgrima de Comodoro Rivadavia
- 2004: Provincial Osorno
- 2007–2008: Penarol Mar del Plata
- 2008–2009: Atletico Independiente Neuquen
- 2009: Everton de Vina del Mar
- 2009–2010: El Nacional Monte Hermoso
- 2010–2011: Asociacion Espanola
- 2011–2012: Club Alianza Viedma
- 2012–2013: Huracan Trelew
- 2013–2014: San Lorenzo de Almagro
- 2014–2015: Olimpo de Bahia Blanca

Career highlights
- FIBA Americas League winner (2008); LNB champion (2006); DIMAYOR champion (2004); All-NBL Third Team (1995); SWAC Player of the Year (1994); 2× First-team All-SWAC (1993, 1994)

Jervaughn Henry Scales Van Hook (born August 11, 1971) is an American-Argentinian former professional basketball player. He played three years of college basketball for the Southern Jaguars before playing professionally between 1994 and 2015.

== Early life ==
A native of New York City, Scales and his family moved four different times within the metropolitan area before he was 15 years old. They relocated, permanently, to Dayton, Ohio at that time, and it was in Ohio that he discovered how much he enjoyed playing basketball. Due to low test scores, Scales did not get recruited out of high school. Only Southern University took a calculated risk in recruiting him, although he was forced to sit out his freshman season due to Proposition 48 rules.

== College ==
In his three years of eligibility between 1991–92 and 1993–94, Scales had a standout career. He led the Southern Jaguars to the 1993 NCAA Tournament as a junior. As a #13 seed, they upset the heavily favored #4 seed Georgia Tech 93–78 behind Scales' 27 points and 18 rebounds. They lost in the next round, however. As a senior, he finished in the top 5 in the nation for both scoring average and rebounding average. At one point during that season he was number one in both statistical categories and could have joined Kurt Thomas, Hank Gathers and Xavier McDaniel as the only players in Division I history to have led the nation in both categories in the same season. On February 7, 1994, Scales grabbed 32 rebounds in a game against Grambling State, which is tied for the third-highest total in the post-1973 basketball era. At the end of his senior year he was named the Southwestern Athletic Conference Player of the Year.

== Professional ==
After starting out playing in Europe, Australia and the United States, Scales began playing exclusively in South America in 2000. He played 15 seasons in Argentina and had two short stints in Chile. He won a DIMAYOR championship with Provincial Osorno in 2004, an LNB championship with Gimnasia y Esgrima de Comodoro Rivadavia in 2006, and won the FIBA Americas League with Penarol Mar del Plata in 2008.

== See also ==
- List of NCAA Division I men's basketball players with 30 or more rebounds in a game
