= 2010 NBA Development League draft =

General information
- Sport: Basketball
- Date: November 1, 2010
- Location: New York, New York

Overview
- League: NBA
- First selection: Nick Fazekas, Reno Bighorns

The 2010 NBA D-League Draft occurred on November 1, 2010. The first pick was Nick Fazekas by the Reno Bighorns.

== Round 1 ==
1. Reno Bighorns - Nick Fazekas, Nevada
2. New Mexico Thunderbirds - Alan Anderson, Michigan St.
3. Maine Red Claws - Magnum Rolle, Louisiana Tech
4. Texas Legends - Matt Rogers, S.W. Baptist
5. Springfield Armor - Vernon Goodridge, La Salle
6. Iowa Energy - Chris Lofton, Tennessee
7. Rio Grande Valley Vipers - Robert Vaden, UAB
8. Utah Flash - Brandon Costner, NC State
9. Dakota Wizards - Chris Johnson, LSU
10. Fort Wayne Mad Ants - Obi Muonelo, Oklahoma St.
11. Sioux Falls Skyforce - Cheikh Samb, Senegal
12. Bakersfield Jam - Marqus Blakely, Vermont
13. Tulsa 66ers - Scottie Reynolds, Villanova
14. Austin Toros - Dominique Archie, South Carolina
15. Erie BayHawks - Ivan Johnson, Cal St. San Bernardino
16. Idaho Stampede - Salim Stoudamire, Arizona

== Round 2 ==
1. Idaho Stampede - Walter Sharpe, UAB
2. Erie Bay Hawks - Kyle Spain, San Diego St.
3. Austin Toros - Lance Thomas, Duke
4. Tulsa 66ers - Perry Stevenson, Kentucky
5. Bakersfield Jam - Brandon Wallace, South Carolina
6. Sioux Falls Skyforce - Sean Marshall, Boston College
7. Maine Red Claws - Kenny Hayes, Miami-Ohio
8. Dakota Wizards - Bart Badgett, George Washington
9. Utah Flash - Nkem Ojougboh, Northeastern
10. Rio Grande Valley Vipers - Marquis Gilstrap, Iowa St.
11. Iowa Energy - Luke Zeller, Notre Dame
12. Springfield Armor - L. D. Williams, Wake Forest
13. Texas Legends - Antonio Daniels, Bowling Green
14. Maine Red Claws - Chamberlain Oguchi, Illinois St.
15. New Mexico Thunderbirds - Anthony Richardson, Florida St.
16. Reno Bighorns - Takais Brown, University of Georgia

== Round 3 ==
1. Reno Bighorns - James Florence, Mercer
2. New Mexico Thunderbirds - Josh Bostic, Findlay
3. Maine Red Claws - Lawrence Westbrook, Minnesota
4. Texas Legends - Justin Dentmon, Washington
5. Springfield Armor - Michael Washington, Arkansas
6. Iowa Energy - Kammron Taylor, Wisconsin
7. Rio Grande Valley Vipers - Mouhammad Faye, SMU
8. Utah Flash - D'Andre Bell, Georgia Tech
9. Dakota Wizards - Brendon Knox, Auburn
10. Fort Wayne Mad Ants - Corey Allmond, Sam Houston St.
11. Sioux Falls Skyforce - Brad Byerson, Virginia Union
12. Bakersfield Jam - Kenny Taylor, Texas
13. Tulsa 66ers - Josh Lomers, Baylor
14. Austin Toros - Josh Young, Drake
15. Erie BayHawks - Tasheed Carr, St. Joseph's
16. Idaho Stampede - Dominique Johnson, Azusa Pacific

== Round 4 ==
1. Idaho Stampede - Chris Roberts, Bradley
2. Erie Bay Hawks - Derek Raivio, Gonzaga
3. Austin Toros - Garrett Williamson, St. Joseph's
4. Tulsa 66ers - Devin Sweetney, St. Francis (PA)
5. Bakersfield Jam - Cyrus Tate, Iowa
6. Sioux Falls Skyforce - Keaton Grant, Purdue
7. Fort Wayne Mad Ants - Anthony Goods, Stanford
8. Dakota Wizards - Rico Pickett, Manhattan
9. Utah Flash - Darren Kent, Kansas St.
10. Rio Grande Valley Vipers - Richard Roby, Colorado
11. Iowa Energy - Michael Haynes, Fordham
12. Springfield Armor - Garfield Blair, Stetson
13. Texas Legends - Kelvin Lewis, Houston
14. Maine Red Claws - Quinn Flaherty, Oregon
15. New Mexico Thunderbirds - Zach Atkinson, Cal-Irvine
16. Reno Bighorns - Chavis Holmes, VMI

== Round 5 ==
1. Reno Bighorns - Daniel Horton, Michigan
2. New Mexico Thunderbirds - Kashif Watson, Idaho
3. Maine Red Claws - James Lewis, Fresno Pacific
4. Texas Legends - Moussa Seck, Senegal
5. Springfield Armor - Jerry Smith, Louisville
6. Iowa Energy - Scott VanderMeer, Illinois-Chicago
7. Rio Grande Valley Vipers - Clevin Hannah, Wichita St.
8. Utah Flash - Ricky Shields, Rutgers
9. Dakota Wizards - Robert Diggs, George Washington
10. Fort Wayne Mad Ants - Adam Zahn, Oregon
11. Sioux Falls Skyforce - Wink Adams, UNLV
12. Bakersfield Jam - Lorrenzo Wade, San Diego St.
13. Tulsa 66ers - Mamadi Diane, Virginia
14. Austin Toros - Marcus Hubbard, Angelo St.
15. Erie BayHawks - David Gomez, Tulane
16. Idaho Stampede - Kentrell Gransberry, South Florida

== Round 6 ==
1. Idaho Stampede - Alan Daniels, Lamar
2. Erie Bay Hawks - Jared Carter, Kentucky
3. Austin Toros - Vernon Hamilton, Clemson
4. Tulsa 66ers - Brandon Brooks, Alabama St.
5. Bakersfield Jam - John Bryant, St. Joseph's
6. Sioux Falls Skyforce - Larry Darnell Cox, Mississippi Valley St.
7. Fort Wayne Mad Ants - Shawn Hawkins, Long Beach St.
8. Dakota Wizards - Dominique Scales, East Central
9. Utah Flash - Carlos Medlock, Eastern Michigan
10. Rio Grande Valley Vipers - Isaiah Swann, Florida St.
11. Iowa Energy - Kendrick Price, Michigan
12. Springfield Armor - James Booyer, IUPUI
13. Texas Legends - Booker Woodfox, Creighton
14. Maine Red Claws - JaJuan Smith, Tennessee
15. New Mexico Thunderbirds - Dominique Coleman, Colorado
16. Reno Bighorns - Alex Smith, Augusta St.

== Round 7 ==
1. Reno Bighorns - Bamba Fall, SMU
2. New Mexico Thunderbirds - Tyler Hughes, Kansas St.
3. Maine Red Claws - Eugene Spates, Northeastern
4. Texas Legends - Curtis Terry, UNLV
5. Springfield Armor - Garrison Johnson, Jackson St.
6. Iowa Energy - Bobby Maze, Tennessee
7. Rio Grande Valley Vipers - Antoine Tisby, South Carolina
8. Utah Flash - Amadou Mbodji, Jacksonville St.
9. Dakota Wizards - Michael Gerrity, USC
10. Fort Wayne Mad Ants - Aaron Nixon, Long Beach St.
11. Sioux Falls Skyforce - Brandon Hazzard, Troy University
12. Bakersfield Jam - Ollie Bailey, Oklahoma
13. Tulsa 66ers - Marlon Jones, Oklahoma St.
14. Austin Toros - Shagari Alleyne, Kentucky
15. Erie BayHawks - Dawan Robinson, Rhode Island
16. Idaho Stampede - Willie Jenkins, Tennessee Tech

== Round 8 ==
1. Idaho Stampede - J.T. Tiller, Missouri
2. Erie Bay Hawks - Jimmy Conyers, Akron
3. Austin Toros - Scotter McFadgon, Tennessee
4. Tulsa 66ers - Michael Sturns, Holy Family
5. Bakersfield Jam - Maurice Acker, Marquette
6. Sioux Falls Skyforce - J.R. Inman, Rutgers
7. Fort Wayne Mad Ants - Deandrea Thomas, Robert Morris
8. Dakota Wizards - Joe Darger, UNLV
9. Utah Flash - Kent Tuttle, BYU
10. Rio Grande Valley Vipers - David Potter, Clemson
11. Iowa Energy - David Nurse, Western Illinois
12. Springfield Armor - Antoine Pearson, Manhattan
13. Texas Legends - Reece Hampton, Adams St.
14. Maine Red Claws - Armon Bassett, Ohio University
15. New Mexico Thunderbirds - Alex Zampier, Yale
16. Reno Bighorns - Gerard Anderson, California St-Fullerton
