= Adarrial Smylie =

American basketball player

Personal information
- Listed height: 6 ft 7 in (2.01 m)
- Listed weight: 225 lb (102 kg)

Career information
- High school: St. Amant (Ascension Parish, Louisiana)
- College: Pearl River CC (1996–1997); Southern (1997–2000)
- NBA draft: 2000: undrafted
- Position: Center

Career highlights
- 2× SWAC Player of the Year (1999, 2000); 3× First-team All-SWAC (1998–2000); Louisiana Mr. Basketball (1996)

Adarrial Smylie is an American former basketball player known for his collegiate career at Southern University between 1997–98 and 1999–2000. Smylie was a three-time All-Southwestern Athletic Conference selection and became the seventh back-to-back SWAC Player of the Year.

Smylie attended St. Amant High School in Ascension Parish, Louisiana from 1992 to 1996. Before enrolling at Southern to play for the Jaguars, he played junior college basketball at Pearl River Community College. After a solid career at Pearl River, Smylie went on to score 1,353 points in just three seasons at Southern. He was second in the SWAC in point per game (19.0) as a junior in 1998–99, but also finished first in field-goal percentage (.563), first in rebounding (8.9 rpg.), fourth in blocks per game (1.63) and ninth in free-throw percentage (.732). He was named the SWAC Player of the Year for the first time. Then, as a senior, he led the league in scoring (18.2 ppg) and became a repeat winner of the award.

Smylie went undrafted in the 2000 NBA draft. He now works professionally in business.
