= L. D. Williams =

American professional basketball player (born 1988)

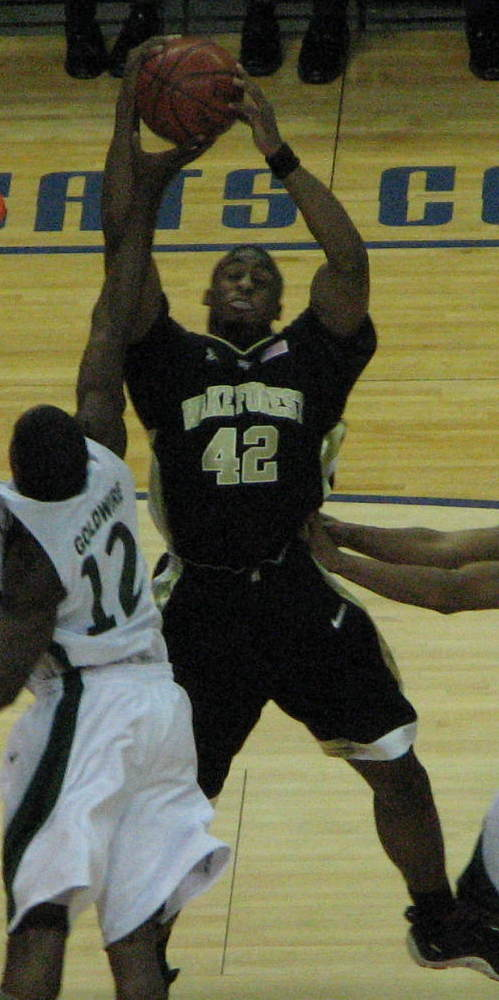

Chicago Bulls
- Title: Assistant coach

Personal information
- Born: May 8, 1988 (age 38) McKeesport, Pennsylvania
- Listed height: 6 ft 4 in (1.93 m)
- Listed weight: 210 lb (95 kg)

Career information
- High school: Forbush (East Bend, North Carolina); Montverde Academy (Montverde, Florida)
- College: Wake Forest (2006–2010)
- NBA draft: 2010: undrafted
- Playing career: 2010–2019
- Position: Shooting guard / small forward

Career history

Playing
- 2010–2011: Springfield Armor
- 2011: Alaska Aces
- 2011–2012: Springfield Armor
- 2012–2013: JL Bourg-en-Bresse
- 2013–2015: Springfield Armor / Grand Rapids Drive
- 2016: Fort Wayne Mad Ants
- 2017–2018: Torpan Pojat
- 2018–2019: KD Ilirija

Coaching
- 2023–2024: Long Island Nets (assistant)
- 2024-present: Chicago Bulls (assistant)

Career highlights
- LNB Pro B Slam Dunk champion (2013); NBA D-League Slam Dunk champion (2012); 2× ACC All-Defensive Team (2009, 2010)
- Stats at Basketball Reference

Larry Demetrius Williams (born May 8, 1988) is an American former professional basketball player. He played college basketball for Wake Forest University and is the only Demon Deacon in school history to garner multiple ACC All-Defensive team honors. He is 6'4" and plays both shooting guard and small forward. currently working as an assistant coach for the Chicago Bulls of the NBA.

== High school career ==
Williams attended Forbush High School in East Bend, North Carolina as a freshman and sophomore where he played football and ran track before transferring to Montverde Academy in Montverde, Florida where he was coached by Kevin Sutton. As a senior at Montverde in 2005–06, he averaged 17.4 points, 3.4 assists, 3.0 rebounds and 2.3 steals per game as he earned second-team all-state and named to the All-Central Florida second team by the Orlando Sentinel. He was also named the Lake County Player of the Year.

== College career ==
As a freshman at Wake Forest in 2006–07, Williams started all 31 games to stand behind only Josh Howard and Tim Duncan as players that started more games as freshmen. He finished the season ranked second on the team in assists (41) and steals (34) as he averaged 8.2 points and 4.1 rebounds per game.

As team captain in his sophomore season, Williams appeared in 26 games and made 25 starts as he missed four games due to a fractured right hand suffered on January 22, 2008, at Clemson. He averaged 8.9 points and 3.8 rebounds per game, ranking third and fourth respectively on the team in 2007–08.

Serving as team captain again in his junior season, Williams started all 31 games for the second time in his career. He was named to the ACC All-Defensive team, becoming the first Deacon since Josh Howard in 2002–03 to be named first-team ACC All-Defense. He also received the team's Best Defensive Player award for the second time in his career. He averaged 8.0 points and 2.7 rebounds per game while he ranked fourth on the team in steals (28) and fifth in assists (34).

As a senior in 2009–10, Williams started all 31 games once again, and for the second straight year, he earned ACC All-Defensive team honors after ranking 20th in the ACC in rebounding. He averaged 8.7 points and 5.6 rebounds per game, rounding off his college career as one of the top defenders in program history. In his final collegiate game, against Kentucky, he surpassed the 1,000-point milestone and finished with 1,005 career points. The three-year captain also placed fourth in the 2010 College Slam Dunk Contest.

== Professional career ==
=== Springfield Armor ===
After going undrafted in the 2010 NBA draft, Williams was selected by the Springfield Armor in the second round of the 2010 NBA Development League Draft. He went on to make his professional debut on November 19, 2010, against the Erie BayHawks, recording 14 points, 8 rebounds and 3 steals. On January 2, 2011, Williams scored a season-high 21 points against the BayHawks. On February 7, he left Springfield in order to sign in the Philippines. In 23 games, he averaged 10.8 points, 3.7 rebounds, 1.8 assists and 1.2 steals per game.

=== Alaska Aces ===
On February 10, 2011, Williams officially joined the Alaska Aces of the Philippine Basketball Association (PBA). On March 28, Williams was fined ₱20,000 and suspended for one game after hitting Mark Cardona with a swinging elbow. League commissioner Chito Salud said, "I don't think it's necessary for a player to swing an elbow during a play. But he has to face the consequences once he hit somebody. Whether it's intentional or not, he hit somebody with an elbow, so that merits a penalty."

=== Return to Springfield ===
On October 26, 2011, Williams returned to the Springfield Armor to compete in the 2011–12 season. In his first game back for Springfield on November 25, 2011, in a win over the Maine Red Claws, he recorded 17 points, 7 rebounds and 2 steals. He recorded his first career double-double on December 15 against the Erie BayHawks, finishing the game with a career-high 33 points along with 10 rebounds in the 117–123 loss.

=== JL Bourg-en-Bresse ===
After playing in four games for the San Antonio Spurs during the 2012 NBA Summer League, Williams signed with JL Bourg-en-Bresse of France for the 2012–13 LNB Pro B season. He made his debut on September 29, 2012, as he recorded 13 points, 3 rebounds and 2 assists against SOMB Boulogne-sur-Mer. In a win over Lille Métropole Basket Clubs on November 9, 2012, he scored a season-high 21 points. After winning the league's slam dunk contest held on December 30, Williams failed to appear in another game for JL after an ankle injury he sustained earlier in the season finally forced him out.

=== Return to D-League ===
On October 31, 2013, Williams made his second return to the Springfield Armor where in 2013–14, he averaged 6.6 points and 2.1 rebounds in 30 games.

On October 31, 2014, Williams was acquired by the newly established Grand Rapids Drive. On November 26, 2014, he scored a season-high 18 points in a 127–99 win over the Los Angeles D-Fenders. On February 27, 2015, Williams ruptured his left patellar tendon, and it was announced he would miss the remainder of the season. During the 2014–15 season, he averaged 11.5 points and 3.9 rebounds in 29 minutes a game.

On January 29, 2016, Williams was acquired by the Fort Wayne Mad Ants. On February 16, he made his debut for the Mad Ants in a 105–97 win over Grand Rapids, recording two points and two rebounds in six minutes.

=== Torpan Pojat, Finland ===
In August 2017, Williams signed with Finland 1A-division club Torpan Pojat, Helsinki.

=== KD Ilirija ===
He currently plays for KD Ilirija and plays in Slovenia.

== The Basketball Tournament ==
L.D. Williams played for Team Wake The Nation in the 2018 edition of The Basketball Tournament. He had a team-high 14 points and eight rebounds in the team's first-round loss to Team Showtime.

== Personal ==
Williams is the son of Larry and Leslie Williams, and has one brother and one sister. He graduated from Wake Forest with a degree in communication. In high school, he was a member of the choir and president of Logos, a Bible study club.
