= Eugene Spates =

American basketball player

Personal information
- Born: January 11, 1987 (age 39) Dallas, Texas
- Listed height: 6 ft 8 in (2.03 m)
- Listed weight: 235 lb (107 kg)

Career information
- High school: Hillcrest (Dallas, Texas)
- College: Collin College (2005–2006); Northeastern (2006–2009)
- NBA draft: 2009: undrafted
- Playing career: 2009–2015
- Position: Small forward
- Number: 24

Career history
- 2009–2010: BC Mess
- 2010–2011: Maine Red Claws
- 2011–2012: Springfield Armor
- 2012–2013: Al-Nweidrat
- 2013–2014: Al Gharafa Doha
- 2014–2015: Al-Nweidrat

Career highlights
- Qatari League champion (2014); Qatari Emir Cup champion (2014)

Eugene Spates (born January 11, 1987) is an American professional basketball player. A Dallas, Texas native, Spates played collegiately with the Northeastern University Huskies in Boston, Massachusetts from 2006 to 2009. With Northeastern, Spates averaged 7.5 points in 95 career games.

In 2009, Spates signed with BC Mess of Luxembourg where he averaged 34.6 points and 13.2 rebounds per game during the 2009–10 season. On November 1, 2010, he was selected by the Maine Red Claws in the seventh round of the 2010 NBA Development League Draft. On February 14, 2011, he was traded to the Springfield Armor in exchange for Vernon Goodridge. In 52 games for Maine and Springfield in 2010–11, he averaged 7.3 points and 4.3 rebounds per game. He returned to the Armor for the 2011–12 season and averaged 5.4 points and 3.4 rebounds in 34 games.

In 2012, Spates joined Al-Nweidrat of the Bahraini Premier League. In 2013, he moved to Qatar where he joined Al Gharafa Doha for the 2013–14 season. He then returned to Al-Nweidrat for the 2014–15 season.
