= Randy Bolden =

American basketball coach

Co–Lin CC Wolves
- Title: Head coach
- League: MACCC

Personal information
- Born: c. 1976 Jackson, Mississippi, U.S.
- Listed height: 6 ft 2 in (1.88 m)

Career information
- High school: Forest Hill (Jackson, Mississippi)
- College: Texas Southern (1994–1998)
- NBA draft: 1998: undrafted
- Playing career: 1998–2002
- Position: Point guard
- Coaching career: 2002–present

Career history

Playing
- 1998–1999: Londrina
- 1999–2002: Youngstown / Saskatchewan Hawks

Coaching
- 2002–2004: Provine HS (assistant)
- 2004–2007: Pearl HS
- 2007–2016: Meridian HS
- 2016–2017: Hinds CC (assistant)
- 2017–2021: Jones County JC
- 2021–2025: Mississippi College
- 2025–present: Co–Lin CC

Career highlights
- As player: 2× SWAC Player of the Year (1997, 1998); SWAC Freshman of the Year (1995)

Randy Bolden (born c. 1976) is an American college basketball head coach for Mississippi College. He took over in April 2021, with previous head coaching experience at the high school and junior college levels.

== Playing career ==
=== College ===
Bolden's collegiate career was at Texas Southern University between 1994 and 1998. A 6 ft 2 in (1.88 m) point guard, Bolden was twice named the Southwestern Athletic Conference (SWAC) Player of the Year, first as a junior and again as a senior. He was born in Jackson, Mississippi and attended Forest Hill High School prior to enrolling at Texas Southern.

In Bolden's four years at Texas Southern, he scored approximately 2,000 points and finished in the national top 10 in scoring on two occasions. He was the SWAC Freshman of the Year in 1994–95, and during the 1995 NCAA Tournament he helped the 15th-seeded Tigers nearly upset 2nd-seeded Arkansas, the defending national champions (Arkansas won, 79–78). For his first two seasons, Bolden was a teammate of Kevin Granger, the national scoring leader in 1995–96. For his final two years he earned All-SWAC honors and was twice named the conference player of the year.

=== Professional ===
After his time at Texas Southern ended, Bolden played professionally for teams in Brazil, Iceland, and Canada. In August 1999, Bolden signed with Grindavík. On August 29, he scored 29 points in a tournament deciding victory against Keflavík in an unofficial pre-season tournament which included all the Úrvalsdeild karla teams. On September 23, Bolden was released by the club before the start of the 1999–2000 Úrvalsdeild season.

== Coaching career ==
=== High school ===
After Bolden retired from playing in 2002, he became an assistant boys' basketball coach for two years at Provine High School in Jackson, Mississippi. Then, for the next 12 seasons, he served at head coach for Pearl High School (2004–07) and Meridian High School (2007–16). While at Meridian, Bolden guided the Wildcats to a combined 227–55 record, 2011 MHSAA 6A State Championship (29–2 overall) and back-to-back south state crowns in 2010 and 2011. He also served as the North/South All-Star Game head coach during the record 2011 season.

=== College ===
In 2016, Bolden jumped into junior college coaching, spending one season as an assistant coach for Hinds Community College in Raymond, Mississippi. He got his first junior college head coaching opportunity at Jones County Junior College where he spent four seasons (2017–21); he guided the Bobcats to a 59–31 overall record (including back-to-back 20-win seasons), a South Division championship, and a conference runner-up finish in 2018–19. The Bobcats also finished as NJCAA Region 23 runners-up in 2019–20. In his first three years at Jones, 17 players signed to play at the four-year level.

On April 8, 2021, Bolden took over NCAA Division II program Mississippi College, becoming the first Black head coach in school history. He succeeded Mike Jones, who resigned after two seasons leading the Choctaws. In his four seasons at the helm, he guided Mississippi College to the Gulf South Conference tournament in the 2022–23 and 2023–24 seasons, the Choctaws first appearance since the 1995–96 season. He finished his four-year tenure with a 43–69 overall record. In 2025, Bolden became the head coach at Copiah–Lincoln Community College.
