= Zeke Moore (American football) =

American football player (1943–2026)

No. 22
- Position: Cornerback

Personal information
- Born: December 2, 1943; Tuskegee, Alabama, U.S.
- Died: September 22, 2026 (aged 82)
- Listed height: 6 ft 3 in (1.91 m)
- Listed weight: 198 lb (90 kg)

Career information
- High school: Booker T. Washington (Tuskegee)
- College: Lincoln (MO)
- NFL draft: 1967: 5th round, 127th overall pick

Career history
- Houston Oilers (1967–1977)

Awards and highlights
- Pro Bowl (1970); AFL All-Star (1969)

Career NFL/AFL statistics
- Interceptions: 24
- Fumble recoveries: 8
- Touchdowns: 4
- Stats at Pro Football Reference

Zeke Moore (December 2, 1943 – September 22, 2026) was an American professional football player who was a defensive back for the American Football League (AFL)'s Houston Oilers (now Tennessee Titans) from 1967 to 1969, and for the National Football League (NFL)'s Oilers from 1970 through 1977. Moore returned 14 kicks for 405 yards as a rookie. Before his professional career, Moore played college football for the Lincoln Blue Tigers. He was a Houston Texans ambassador for five years.

== Early life ==
Moore was born in Tuskegee, Alabama, on December 2, 1943. He attended Tuskegee Laboratory High School/Tuskegee Institute High School (later part of Booker T. Washington High School in Tuskegee), where he played football, baseball and basketball, and was a member of the track team. He was twice selected All-State and All-District in basketball, and was also team captain those two years. Moore was named to the All-Star Team in 1963's eight-state National High School Basketball Tournament, played in Nashville, Tennessee. He was the football team's captain during his senior year.

== College career ==
Moore attended Lincoln University in Jefferson City, Missouri. He played on the football team at halfback, defensive back, kickoff returner and punt returner from 1963 to 1966 under coach Dwight Reed. In 1964, at 6 ft 2 in (1.88 m) and 190 pounds (86.2 kg), he led Lincoln in scoring with 10 touchdowns (60 points) and had a 60-yard run from scrimmage. On the season, he had 308 yards rushing in only 44 attempts (7.0 yards per carry). He averaged 30 yards on punt returns, and had a 55-yard punt return for a touchdown against Peru State College in a September game. On defense, he returned an interception 101 yards in a game against Arkansas Am&N (now University of Arkansas at Pine Bluff) that year.

He was injured during most of the 1965 season. In 1966, he was team co-captain. Moore had six interceptions in nine games that season. In November, Lincoln played in the second Gateway Classic Benefit Game against Tennessee A&I (now Tennessee State University). He returned a kickoff 75 yards for a touchdown in a November 1966 game against Kentucky State.

== Professional career ==
The Houston Oilers selected Moore in the fifth round of the 1967 NFL/AFL draft (127th overall); and he played for the team over his entire 11-year career. In the NFL, he played at 6 ft 3 in (1.90 m) 198 lb (89 kg).

Moore was used as a defensive back, kickoff and punt returner in his rookie season. In only his second game as a rookie, Moore returned a punt 46 yards to set up a touchdown, and another 34 yards to set up a field goal, in the Oilers 20–3 upset victory over the Buffalo Bills. He had a 92-yard kickoff return for a touchdown against the Kansas City Chiefs on October 22. On the year, he did not start any games at cornerback, but returned five punts for 85 years (16.5 yards per return), and 14 kickoffs for 405 yards (28.9 yards per return). He did not have enough kickoff returns to qualify for the league lead in average per return, which went to Noland Smith at 28.0 yards per return. The Oilers won the AFL's Eastern division with a 9–4–1 record, losing in the AFL championship game to the Oakland Raiders. Moore had three kickoff returns for 87 yards (29.0 yards per return) in that game.

In his second season (1968), Moore remained a backup defensive back. He returned only one punt that season, but had 32 returns on kickoffs for 787 yards. In 1969, he played in 13 games, starting nine at right cornerback, and was not used for kickoff or punt returns. He had four interceptions, including a 51-yard interception against future Football Hall of Fame quarterback Joe Namath, that he returned for a touchdown in an October 1969 game against the New York Jets. He was selected to the 1969 AFL All-Star team at cornerback, for the game played on January 17, 1970, in Houston. This was the AFL's last game as an entity distinct from the original NFL.

In 1970, Moore started all 14 games for the Oilers at right cornerback, with a career-high six interceptions on the season (tied for 9th best in the NFL). He returned seven kickoffs for 190 yards (27.1 yards per return). Moore was named to the American Football Conference's (AFC) 1970 Pro Bowl team. In 1971, Moore moved to left cornerback, with Willie Alexander starting the majority of his games at right cornerback. Moore had three interceptions, and returned ten kickoffs for 214 yards in 1971.

In 1972, Moore broke his arm in a freak accident and played in only eight games (starting only four). He returned seven punts and one kickoff that year, the last returns of his career. In 1973, Moore started 11 games at left cornerback. He did not have an interception in 1972 or 1973. The Oilers had 1–13 records in both 1972 and 1973.

In 1974, the Oilers had their best record (7–7) since 1969, under head coach Sid Gillman. Moore started all 14 games, playing right cornerback. He had two interceptions on the year, including a 22-yard touchdown return against the New York Jets in early November; the second time he had returned an interception against Joe Namath for a touchdown.

He remained a starter at right cornerback for the final three seasons of his career with the Oilers (1975–77). The team's best record during his tenure came in 1975 (10–4). That year, Moore had five interceptions for 137 yards, including a 74-yard interception return on December 7 against the San Francisco 49ers. The Oilers released Moore in late August 1978, ending his career.

Over his 11-year AFL/NFL career with the Oilers, Moore started 102 of the 145 games in which he played. He returned 64 kickoffs with a 25.3 yards per return average, with one touchdown return. He had 24 interceptions, returning two for touchdowns.

== Personal life and death ==
In 1971, Moore's father was killed by an automobile while walking in Tuskegee.

Moore served as president of the Townwood Homeowners Association in Houston, and he was a Texas Registered Peace Officer.

Moore died on September 22, 2026, at the age of 82.

== Honors ==
In 1989, fans chose Moore to be included on the Houston Oilers 30th Anniversary Dream Team.

In 2011, he was inducted into the Lincoln University Athletics Hall of Fame.
