= Gregory Burks =

American basketball player (born 1980)

Personal information
- Born: 1980 (age 45–46) Flint, Michigan, U.S.
- Listed height: 5 ft 9 in (1.75 m)
- Listed weight: 161 lb (73 kg)

Career information
- High school: Flint Northern (Flint, Michigan)
- College: Prairie View A&M (1998–2003)
- Playing career: 2003–2011
- Position: Point guard

Career highlights
- SWAC Player of the Year (2003); 2× First Team All-SWAC (2002–03); AP Honorable Mention All-American (2003)

Gregory "Toine" Burks (born 1980) is an American former professional basketball player who spent his eight-year career playing for various teams in Germany between 2003 and 2011. He is 5 ft 9 in (1.75 m), weighs approximately 160 pounds and played the point guard position.

== Career ==
Growing up in Flint, Michigan, Burks attended Flint Northern High School and starred on the basketball team. He was a little younger than local area star Mateen Cleaves but he grew up observing Cleaves' game and modeled his own after it. By the time he graduated high school in 1998, Burks only weighed 135 pounds, but his skills were good enough to land him on the team at Prairie View A&M University, where during his five-year career he averaged 17.1 points, 4.2 assists and 3.1 rebounds in 117 games played. He spent one season redshirting due to injury. During his junior and senior seasons, Burks was a First Team All-Southwestern Athletic Conference (SWAC) player, and in 2002–03 he was tabbed the SWAC Player of the Year.

After graduating in 2003, Burks spent the next 7 seasons playing for various clubs in Germany. He officially retired in February 2011, and as of the 2012–13 season he is a boys' basketball coach at Flint Southwestern High School. He also mentors students and players as they develop.

Burks was inducted into the Prairie View A&M University Hall of Fame in February 2012.
