= Robert Williams (Grambling State basketball) =

American basketball player

Personal information
- Listed height: 6 ft 8 in (2.03 m)

Career information
- High school: Mills (Little Rock, Arkansas)
- College: Grambling State (1977–1981)
- NBA draft: 1981: 6th round, 125th overall pick
- Drafted by: Washington Bullets
- Position: Power forward

Career highlights
- SWAC co-Player of the Year (1981); First-team All-SWAC (1981); Second-team All-SWAC (1980)
- Stats at Basketball Reference

Robert "Honey" Williams is an American former college basketball player. He played at Grambling State University from 1977 to 1981 and was named the Southwestern Athletic Conference's co-Player of the Year as a senior in 1980–81. Williams was selected to the All-SWAC First Team as a senior and to the Second Team as a junior. He finished his career with 1,876 points and 1,002 rebounds.

After his collegiate career, Williams was selected in the 1981 NBA draft by the Washington Bullets in the sixth round (125th overall). He was waived before appearing in a regular season game.
