= Frank Sillmon =

American former basketball player (born 1965)

Personal information
- Born: December 19, 1965 (age 60)
- Listed height: 6 ft 6 in (1.98 m)
- Listed weight: 220 lb (100 kg)

Career information
- High school: Talladega County Training School (Talladega, Alabama)
- College: Alabama State (1984–1986); Alabama A&M (1987–1989)
- NBA draft: 1989: undrafted
- Position: Small forward

Career history
- 1989–1990: Sioux Falls Skyforce

Career highlights
- 2× First-team All-SIAC (1988, 1989); SWAC Player of the Year (1986); First-team All-SWAC (1986)

Frank Sillmon (born December 19, 1965) is an American former basketball player. He is best known for his brief collegiate career at Alabama State University, where as a sophomore in 1985–86 he was named the Southwestern Athletic Conference Player of the Year.

A native of Talladega, Alabama, Sillmon attended Talladega County Training School during his prep years. On February 7, 1984, he scored 51 points in a game against Woodland High School. That year—his senior season—he was named the state's "1A Player of the Year" by the Alabama Sports Writers Association. After his successful high school career, Sillmon enrolled at Alabama State in 1984. He spent his first two college seasons playing for the Hornets, and in 1985–86 he was named the SWAC Player of the Year. Sillmon led the conference with a 20.3 points per game average and narrowly edged Jeff Hart of Jackson State by one vote for the honor.

After two seasons, Sillmon decided to transfer. After sitting out the 1986–87 season due to NCAA transfer eligibility rules, his career at Alabama A&M began as a redshirt junior in 1987–88. In his only two years playing for the Bulldogs, his teams won 55 games and only lost 9. He led them in scoring both seasons (20.6, 23.0 respectively), and as a senior in 1988–89 he set Alabama A&M records for total points in a season (736) and per game (23.0). In the 2009 book, ESPN College Basketball Encyclopedia, Sillmon was named one of the five greatest players in A&M program history.

Sillmon played professionally in Finland after college but never made it to the National Basketball Association (NBA).
