= Nigel Moore (basketball) =

American basketball player (born 1981)

Personal information
- Born: September 11, 1981 (age 45) Rochester, New York, U.S.
- Listed height: 6 ft 5 in (1.96 m)
- Listed weight: 198 lb (90 kg)

Career information
- High school: Joseph C. Wilson Magnet (Rochester, New York)
- College: Alabama A&M (1999–2003)
- NBA draft: 2003: undrafted
- Playing career: 2003–present
- Position: Shooting guard / small forward

Career history

Playing
- 2003–2005: TV Lich
- 2005–2006: Gießen 46ers
- 2006: Great Falls Explorers
- 2006–2007: Rochester RazorSharks
- 2007–2008: BG Göttingen
- 2008: Team Componenta Karkkila
- 2008: BG Karlsruhe
- 2010: Rochester RazorSharks
- 2010–2012: UU-Korihait
- 2012–2013: Njarðvík
- 2013–2014: ÍR
- 2014: JA Vichy
- 2016–2017: Torpan Pojat
- 2020: Westside Espoo

Coaching
- 2013: Njarðvík (women's)

Career highlights
- Icelandic All-Star game (2013)

Nigel Moore (born September 11, 1981) is an American professional basketball player, who last played for Torpan Pojat of the Finnish First Division.

== Early career ==
Moore attended Joseph C. Wilson Magnet High School. He played four years of high school basketball(one freshman, one junior varsity and two varsity seasons). His junior year he averaged 12 points per game along with 8 rebounds. Senior year he averaged 17ppg 13 rpg and 4bpg. Moore earned an academic scholarship to Alabama A&M University in 1999.

== College career ==
Moore played right away in college as a freshman. Appearing in 27 games, 6.9 mpg. His sophomore season he appeared in 25 games, 16 mpg, starting in 12 of those games. Junior year he played in 29 games averaging 22 minutes per game. Senior year he played in 27 averaging 24 minutes.

== Professional career ==
Moore went on to play professional basketball in Germany directly after college. He played three consecutive years there (two years for TV Lich, and one season for the Giessen 46ers). 2006 in Rochester for the Razorsharks of the ABA. Moore returned to Germany in the following season for Goettingen in the BBL. He left mid-season and He was picked up by Team Componenta in Finland where he helped them stay in the Top League.

Moore then returned to Germany to play for BG Karlsruhe in the 2008–2009 season. Returning to basketball in 2010, Moore played for Korihait in the top league of Finland.

Moore joined Njarðvík of the Icelandic Úrvalsdeild karla five games into the 2012-2013 season. Njarðvík had started the season poorly, winning only one of their first five games but won eleven of their last seventeen after Moore's arrival. Moore renewed his contract with Njarðvík after the season.

After being released from Njarðvík 11 games into the 2013-2014 season, Moore quickly signed with ÍR who were battling relegation, having only won two of their first eleven games. Moore helped turn ÍR fortunes around, with the team winning seven of their last eleven games and just missing out on the playoffs on a tie-breaker with Snæfell.
