= Purvis Short =

American basketball player (born 1957)

Personal information
- Born: July 2, 1957 (age 69) Hattiesburg, Mississippi, U.S.
- Listed height: 6 ft 7 in (2.01 m)
- Listed weight: 210 lb (95 kg)

Career information
- High school: Blair (Hattiesburg, Mississippi)
- College: Jackson State (1974–1978)
- NBA draft: 1978: 1st round, 5th overall pick
- Drafted by: Golden State Warriors
- Playing career: 1978–1992
- Position: Small forward
- Number: 45, 10

Career history
- 1978–1987: Golden State Warriors
- 1987–1989: Houston Rockets
- 1989–1990: New Jersey Nets
- 1991–1992: Hapoel Tel Aviv

Career highlights
- 2× SWAC Player of the Year (1977, 1978)

Career NBA statistics
- Points: 14,607 (17.3 ppg)
- Rebounds: 3,625 (4.3 rpg)
- Assists: 2,123 (2.5 apg)
- Stats at NBA.com
- Stats at Basketball Reference

Purvis Short (born July 2, 1957) is an American former professional basketball player who played with the Golden State Warriors, Houston Rockets and New Jersey Nets of the National Basketball Association (NBA) from 1978 to 1990. A 6'7" small forward, Short averaged 17.3 points per game over his twelve-season career in the NBA. He is currently the Warriors ninth all-time leading scorer.

After a brilliant career at Jackson State, Short was selected fifth overall in the 1978 NBA draft. Short was affectionately nicknamed "Rainbowman" because of the distinctive rainbow-like high arc of his jump shots, something he stated he obtained in high school. He was a role player and sixth man his first few years in the league. Short was a starter by the 1984–85 season, and scored a career high 59 points in a game against the New Jersey Nets in 1984. After leaving the NBA, he played one year of basketball in Israel, and is currently the director of the NBA Players Association's Department of Player Programs.

== College career ==
Born in Hattiesburg, Mississippi, Purvis is the younger brother of Gene Short, who played one season in the league with the New York Knicks. Purvis attended Blair Center Hattiesburg High School, where he led his team to the state championship title in 1974. He was allegedly recruited by 150 colleges upon graduation. He followed in his brother's footsteps at Jackson State University, where he became the school's all-time leading scorer. He was the NCAA's second leading scorer in 1978, averaged 8.9 rebounds per game, and was named SWAC Player of the Year in 1977 and 1978.

== Professional career ==
Short was drafted with the fifth overall pick of the 1978 NBA draft by the Golden State Warriors who passed up drafting Larry Bird, who was drafted sixth. In his rookie season, Short scored 795 points for a 10.6 points per game average. The next year, Short had a 17.0 point per game average, with a career high .500 field goal percentage in 62 games. The Warriors traded for Bernard King prior to the 1980–81 season, moving Short to a reserve role. That year he played in 79 games, where he had 391 rebounds, a career high 249 assists, and a 16.1 points per game average. The next few seasons he was the Warriors sixth man, playing behind Joe Barry Carroll, until gaining the starting job prior to the 1984–85 season.

Short started working out with Pete Newell during the off-seasons, which Short later claimed help improve his shooting skills significantly. During a November 17, 1984 game against the New Jersey Nets, Short scored a career high 59 points during a 131–114 loss. He hit 20 of 28 field goal attempts and 15 free throws. At the time, only nine other players had scored more points in one game, and it was the most points scored in the NBA since David Thompson and George Gervin scored 73 and 63 points respectively on April 9, 1978. Excluding Wilt Chamberlain's many games of 60 or over points as a Warrior, it was also the third highest total in franchise history, behind Joe Fulks' 63 points in 1949 and Rick Barry's 64 points in 1974. He also scored 57 points against the San Antonio Spurs and 46 against the Washington Bullets that season. Short finished the 1984–85 season with an average of 28.0 points per game, and was the NBA's fourth leading scorer. During the off-season, Short got involved in a contract dispute and held out for four weeks, but the Warriors managed to come to a contract agreement with him. He ended up with a 25.5 points per game average in 64 games in 1985–86, finishing fifth in the league in scoring. Short missed two months early in the 1986–87 season due to knee surgery. He missed further time with a pulled thigh muscle in March. Golden State reached the playoffs, an achievement Short later recalled as "the best time" in his Warriors career. He ended up appearing in 34 games that year, with an 18.3 points per game average.

He was traded to the Houston Rockets for Dave Feitl and a future first-round pick prior to the 1987–88 campaign. At the time of the trade, Short averaged 19.4 points per game in nine seasons with the Warriors and was sixth on the all-time scoring list while second in steals. He averaged 14.3 points per games in 81 games played that year, with 222 rebounds and 162 assists. The next season, Short had a career low 7.4 points per game in 65 games, 16 of them starts. Prior to the start of the 1989–90 season, Short signed as a free agent with the New Jersey Nets, where he played in all 82 games, starting 28 of them. He scored 29 points in a 109–101 win against the Charlotte Hornets on January 11. He could not come to an agreement with the Nets over the term of his contract and retired at season's end.

After leaving the NBA in 1990, Short took a year off basketball. In early 1991 he returned to play, this time in Israel for Hapoel Tel Aviv. Short led the team to a successful season that ended in a 3–2 loss to archrivals Maccabi Tel Aviv during the playoffs. He retired at the end of the season, in 1992.

== After basketball ==
Short took a job with the NBA Players Association's Department of Player Programs, where he was later named director of the program in 1999. He was previously the NBA' Players' Union vice president from 1987 to 1990. He was inducted to the Mississippi Sports Hall of Fame in 1999. He currently lives in Houston.

== NBA career statistics ==
Legend
GP	Games played	GS	Games started	MPG	Minutes per game
FG%	Field goal percentage	3P%	3-point field goal percentage	FT%	Free throw percentage
RPG	Rebounds per game	APG	Assists per game	SPG	Steals per game
BPG	Blocks per game	PPG	Points per game	**Bold**	Career high

=== Regular season ===
Year	Team	GP	GS	MPG	FG%	3P%	FT%	RPG	APG	SPG	BPG	PPG
1978–79	Golden State	75	–	22.7	.479	–	.671	4.6	1.3	0.7	0.2	10.6
1979–80	Golden State	62	–	26.4	**.503**	.000	.812	5.1	2.0	1.0	0.1	17.0
1980–81	Golden State	79	–	29.2	.475	.176	.820	4.9	3.2	1.0	0.2	16.1
1981–82	Golden State	76	8	23.4	.488	.214	.801	3.5	2.8	0.9	0.1	14.4
1982–83	Golden State	67	57	35.8	.487	.267	.828	5.3	3.4	1.4	0.2	21.4
1983–84	Golden State	79	76	37.3	.473	.306	.793	**5.5**	3.1	1.3	0.1	22.8
1984–85	Golden State	78	77	**39.5**	.460	**.313**	.817	5.1	3.0	**1.5**	**0.3**	**28.0**
1985–86	Golden State	64	63	37.9	.482	.306	**.865**	5.1	**3.7**	1.4	**0.3**	25.5
1986–87	Golden State	34	15	27.9	.479	.235	.856	4.0	2.5	1.3	0.2	18.3
1987–88	Houston	81	11	24.1	.481	.238	.858	2.7	2.0	0.7	0.2	14.3
1988–89	Houston	65	16	17.8	.413	.273	**.865**	2.8	1.6	0.7	0.2	7.4
1989–90	New Jersey	**82**	24	27.0	.455	.286	.835	3.0	1.8	0.8	0.2	13.1
Career		842	347	29.2	.474	.282	.824	4.3	2.5	1.0	0.2	17.3

=== Playoffs ===
Year	Team	GP	GS	MPG	FG%	3P%	FT%	RPG	APG	SPG	BPG	PPG
1987	Golden State	**10**	**2**	**25.3**	**.463**	.000	.889	**3.3**	**2.7**	**1.2**	**0.2**	**14.6**
1988	Houston	4	0	17.8	.269	.000	**1.000**	2.3	0.3	0.3	0.0	5.5
1989	Houston	4	0	9.3	.381	.000	.600	2.3	0.3	0.0	0.0	4.8
Career		18	2	20.1	.424	.000	.878	2.8	1.6	0.7	0.1	10.4

=== European leagues ===
Season	Team	League	GP	MPG	FG%	3P%	FT%	RPG	APG	SPG	BPG	PPG
1991-92	H.Tel Aviv	Israel	15	?	.557	.263	.844	4.6	4	?	?	24.4
