= South Cobb High School =

Public high school in Austell, Georgia

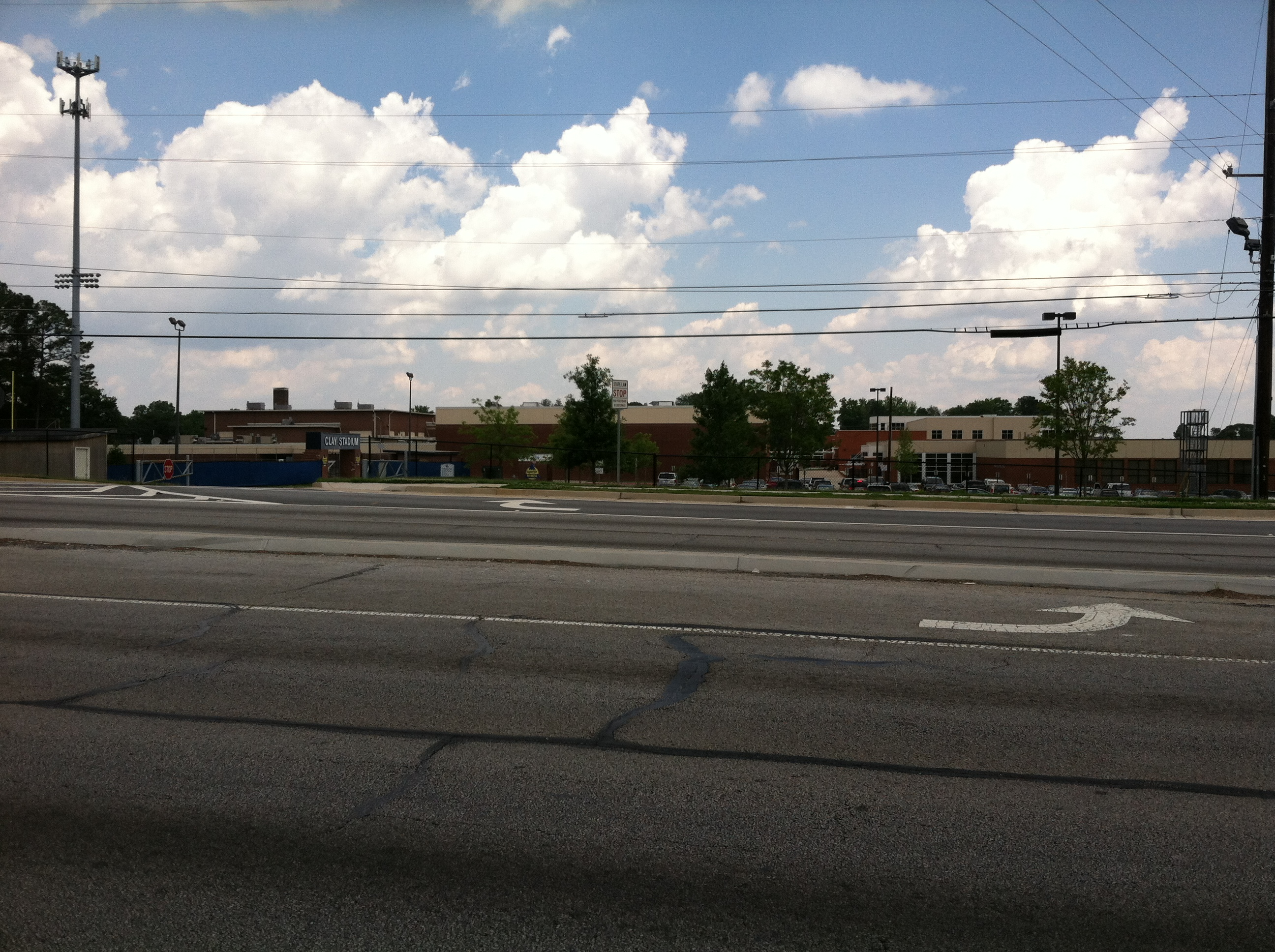

Location
- 1920 Clay Road; Austell, Georgia 30106; United States; 33°50′08″N 84°36′32″W

Information
- Type: Public high school
- Motto: The future belongs to those who prepare for it today.
- Established: 1952; 74 years ago
- School district: Cobb County School District
- Principal: TJ Perry
- Staff: 124.20 (on an FTE basis)
- Grades: 9–12
- Enrollment: 2081 (2024–2025)
- Student to teacher ratio: 17.13
- Colors: Blue, orange, gray and white
- Nickname: The Nest
- Rival: Pebblebrook High School
- Website: www.cobbk12.org/southcobb

South Cobb High School is an American public high school in Mableton, Georgia, with an Austell postal address. Founded in 1952, it is part of the Cobb County School District. Clint Terza succeeded Ashley Hosey as principal in 2016. Nominated as a National School of Excellence, South Cobb High School participates in the Cobb County magnet program. The school houses the county's program for medical sciences.

== History ==
The City of Mableton incorporated in November 2022, and South Cobb High School became a part of the city limits.

== Notable alumni ==
- Nick Ayers, political analyst; graduated from South Cobb in 2000
- Roy Barnes, former Georgia governor; graduated from South Cobb in 1966
- Andrés Cabrero, professional soccer player
- Robby Hammock, former professional baseball player (Arizona Diamondbacks); current manager of the Mobile BayBears; graduated from South Cobb in 1995
- Jerry Jacobs, Detroit Lions cornerback; graduated from South Cobb in 2016
- Garrison Johnson, professional basketball player; graduated from South Cobb in 2006
- Justin Jones, Los Angeles Chargers defensive tackle; graduated from South Cobb in 2014
- Kenny McKinley, Denver Broncos receiver; graduated from South Cobb in 2005
- Billy Wilkins, developer of the Wesley Sleep Program and original member of band Third Day
- Jimmy Wang Yang, professional wrestler
