= Forest Hill High School =

Location
- 2607 Raymond Road; Jackson, Mississippi; United States
- 32°15′40″N 90°16′51″W

Information
- Type: Public
- Established: 1915
- School district: Jackson Public School District
- Teaching staff: 63.23 (FTE)
- Grades: 9–12
- Enrollment: 942 (2023–2024)
- Student to teacher ratio: 14.90
- Colors: Navy, red and white
- Mascot: Patriots
- Website: www.jackson.k12.ms.us/ForestHill

Forest Hill High School is a public high school located in Jackson, Mississippi, United States. It serves students from grades 9–12, and is part of the Jackson Public School District. The current principal is Torrey Hampton.

== Demographics ==
A total of 1,136 students were enrolled in Forest Hill High during the 2006–2007 school year. The gender makeup of the district was 51% female and 49% male. The racial makeup of the school was 96.39% African American, 2.90% White, 0.35% Hispanic, and 0.35% Asian.

== Gifted Education/Open Doors ==
Gifted courses in grades 9–12 are offered based upon funding and teacher units provided by the state. Currently, Forest Hill High School is the only high school in the Jackson Public School District to offer gifted courses in English/language arts.

== History ==
Located on 46 acres Forest Hills sits on the original site since 1915. It is the Oldest Consolidated School in Jackson, Mississippi whose origins begin in the 1800s.

== Feeder pattern ==
The following schools feed into Forest Hill High School.

- Middle Schools
  - Cardozo Middle School
- Elementary Schools
  - Bates Elementary School
  - Oak Forest Elementary School
  - Timberlawn Elementary School
  - Van Winkle Elementary School

== Controversy ==
On October 5, 2018, the school's band performed at halftime during a game against Brookhaven High School, where two police officers had been shot and killed earlier that week. The band's performance was based on the film John Q., and it simulated police being shot by band members dressed as doctors and nurses. This resulted in general outrage, and the governor, Phil Bryant, condemned the act.

Forest Hill High School also came into controversy in 2020 for having a logo and mascot associated with the Confederate States of America. During a campaign to change and remove Confederate associations, Forest Hill parted ways with the Rebel mascot and the Confederate flag logo, although the school retained its colors of red, navy, and white. At the same time, Jackson's Robert E. Lee Elementary was renamed after Drs. Aaron and Ollye Shirley. Dr. Ollye Shirley, who was president of the Jackson Public School Board of Trustees, received death threats for lobbying for the changes at Forest Hill High School.

== Notable alumni ==
- James Eastland (1922), former President pro tempore of the United States Senate
- Lance Barksdale (1985), MLB umpire
- Randy Bolden (1994), college basketball coach and former professional basketball player
- Maurice Carter (1995), former NBA player
- De'Keither Stamps (1995), politician, member of the Mississippi Public Service Commission
- Tony Yarber (1996), former mayor of Jackson, Mississippi
- Ken Evans Jr. (2020), basketball player for the Florida Atlantic Owls
