= Terry Brooks (basketball) =

American former basketball player

Personal information
- Born: c. 1967 (age 58–59)

Career information
- High school: South Macon (Macon, Alabama)
- College: Alabama State (1985–1989)
- NBA draft: 1989: undrafted
- Position: Guard

Career highlights
- SWAC Player of the Year (1989); 2× First-team All-SWAC (1988, 1989); Second-team All-SWAC (1987)

Terry Brooks (born c. 1967) is an American former basketball player known for his collegiate career at Alabama State University. A guard, Brooks played for the Hornets from 1985 to 1989. During his career, he scored well over 2,000 career points, including a Southwestern Athletic Conference (SWAC)-leading 23.1 points per game in 1987–88 and 24.6 in 1988–89. In those two seasons, he scored 624 and 721 total points, respectively. As a junior, he led the league in free throw percentage at 81.8%.

Brooks' career accolades also include being selected to the All-SWAC Second Team in 1987, the First Team in both 1988 and 1989, and his highest honor was being SWAC Player of the Year as a senior in 1988–89. Following his college career, Brooks was selected in the 1989 Continental Basketball Association Draft by the Cedar Rapids Silver Bullets (6th round, 90th overall).

Terry Brooks married his college sweetheart, now Jacquelyn Brooks, and they moved to Brevard County, Florida after college while she earned her master's degree at Nova Southeastern University. They moved back to Macon County, Georgia in 1998 and Jacquelyn works in the Macon County School District.
