= Garrison Johnson =

American basketball player (born 1988)

Personal information
- Born: July 27, 1988 (age 38)
- Listed height: 6 ft 5 in (1.96 m)
- Listed weight: 190 lb (86 kg)

Career information
- High school: South Cobb (Austell, Georgia)
- College: Jackson State (2006–2010)
- NBA draft: 2010: undrafted
- Playing career: 2010–2012
- Position: Shooting guard

Career history
- 2011: Barreirense
- 2011–2012: Valur

Career highlights
- SWAC Player of the Year (2010); First-team All-SWAC (2010)

Garrison Johnson (born July 27, 1988) is an American former professional basketball player. He played college basketball for Jackson State University and later professionally in Europe.

== College career ==
Johnson is best known for his collegiate career at Jackson State University between 2006 and 2010. During his time at Jackson State, Johnson scored 1,251 points and participated in two postseason tournaments: the 2007 NCAA Tournament as a freshman and the 2010 National Invitation Tournament as a senior. Throughout his four-year tenure he steadily increased his scoring averages – 2.7, 7.4, 10.7, and 17.6 points per game. In 2009–10, his senior season, Johnson led the Southwestern Athletic Conference (SWAC) in points per game (18.1), total points (578), free throws (161) and free throw attempts (220). He was named the SWAC Player of the Year, becoming the fifth Jackson State player to earn that honor.

== Professional career ==
After graduating, Johnson was selected in the 2010 NBA Development League Draft by the Springfield Armor in the seventh round. Johnson never played in the D-League, so he began his professional career overseas. In January 2011, he joined Barreirense in Portugal. In 12 games, he averaged 17.6 points and 2.8 rebounds per game.

In November 2011, Johnson signed with Valur in the Icelandic Úrvalsdeild karla, replacing Curry Collins. He was released by the club in end of January 2012 at his own request after appearing in 7 league games where he averaged 21.6 and 5.7 rebounds.

== Later life ==
After his professional career ended, he was hired as a basketball coach at South Cobb High School in Austell, Georgia.
