= Gene Short =

American basketball player

Personal information
- Born: August 7, 1953 Macon, Mississippi, U.S.
- Died: March 16, 2016 (aged 62) Houston, Texas, U.S.
- Listed height: 6 ft 6 in (1.98 m)
- Listed weight: 200 lb (91 kg)

Career information
- High school: Blair (Hattiesburg, Mississippi)
- College: Jackson State (1972–1975)
- NBA draft: 1975: 1st round, 9th overall pick
- Drafted by: New York Knicks
- Playing career: 1975–1976
- Position: Small forward
- Number: 20

Career history
- 1975: Seattle SuperSonics
- 1975–1976: New York Knicks

Career highlights
- 2× SWAC Player of the Year (1974, 1975); First-team Parade All-American (1972)
- Stats at NBA.com
- Stats at Basketball Reference

Eugene Short Jr. (August 7, 1953 – March 16, 2016) was an American professional basketball player. He was a 6'6" 200 lb small forward and attended Jackson State University.

Short was from Hattiesburg, Mississippi. He was selected 9th overall by the NBA's New York Knicks in the 1975 NBA draft. In the previous year he was selected by the American Basketball Association's San Antonio Spurs in the fifth round of the 1974 ABA Draft.

He played for the US national team in the 1974 FIBA World Championship, winning the bronze medal.

He played for the Seattle SuperSonics and New York Knicks (1975–76) in the NBA for 34 games.

Eugene was the older brother of Purvis Short, another onetime NBA player.

== Career statistics ==
Legend
GP	Games played	GS	Games started	MPG	Minutes per game
FG%	Field goal percentage	3P%	3-point field goal percentage	FT%	Free throw percentage
RPG	Rebounds per game	APG	Assists per game	SPG	Steals per game
BPG	Blocks per game	PPG	Points per game	**Bold**	Career high

=== NBA ===
==== Regular season ====
Year	Team	GP	GS	MPG	FG%	FT%	RPG	APG	SPG	BPG	PPG
1975–76	Seattle	7		5.3	**.545**	.500	1.0	**.3**	.0	.0	1.9
1975–76	New York	**27**	0	**6.9**	.325	**.633**	**1.5**	**.3**	**.3**	**.1**	**2.6**
Career		34	0	6.5	.352	.625	1.4	.3	.2	.1	2.5
