= Martaveous McKnight =

American basketball player

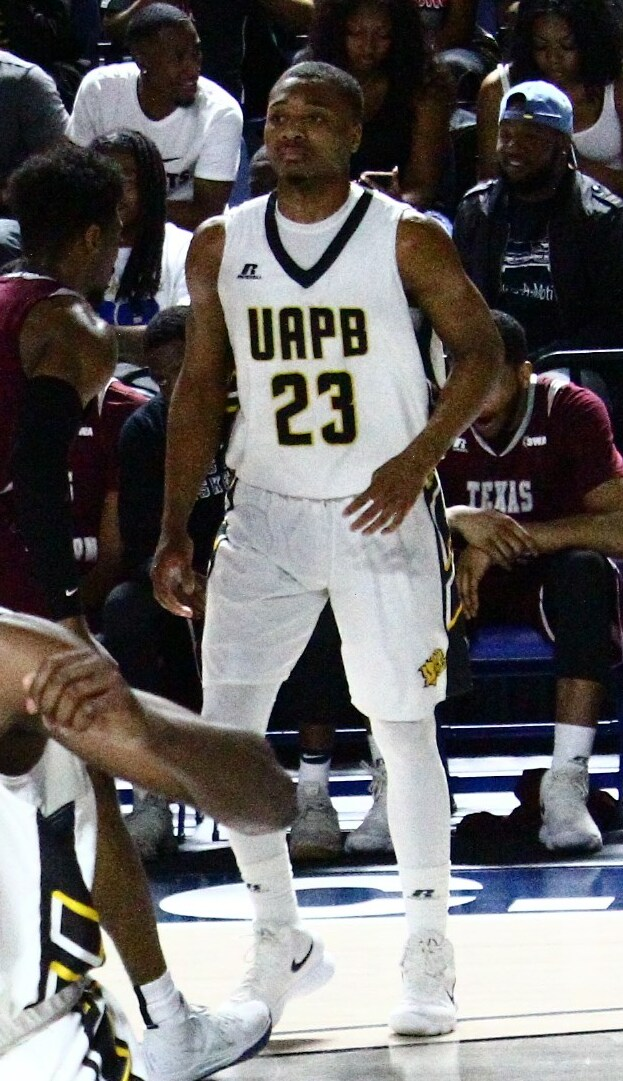
- McKnight in 2018

Free agent
- Position: Shooting guard

Personal information
- Born: April 5, 1997 (age 29) Walls, Mississippi, U.S.
- Listed height: 6 ft 4 in (1.93 m)
- Listed weight: 190 lb (86 kg)

Career information
- High school: Lake Cormorant (Lake Cormorant, Mississippi)
- College: Itawamba CC (2015–2017); Arkansas–Pine Bluff (2017–2019)
- NBA draft: 2019: undrafted
- Playing career: 2019–present

Career history
- 2019–2020: Sloboda Tuzla
- 2021–2022: Manchester Giants
- 2023: Enid Outlaws

Career highlights
- SWAC Player of the Year (2018); 2x First-team All-SWAC (2018, 2019)

Martaveous Davon McKnight (born April 5, 1997) is an American professional basketball player. He played college basketball for Arkansas–Pine Bluff.

== Early career ==
McKnight attended Lake Cormorant High School, where he averaged 24 points per game during his senior season. He enrolled at Itawamba Community College, where he averaged 12.5 points, 4.6 rebounds and 2.0 assists per game and was named one of the Top Incoming Freshmen by the National Junior College Athletic Association (NJCAA). McKnight averaged 8.1 points, 3.7 rebounds and 2.5 assists per game as a sophomore. In June 2017 it was announced that he had signed with Arkansas–Pine Bluff. As a junior he averaged 18.5 points per game, second highest in the SWAC, and 3.5 assists and 2.0 steals per game. At the conclusion of the regular season, he was named SWAC Player of the Year. As a senior, McKnight averaged 20.8 points, 5 rebounds, 3 assists and 1.5 steals per game. He was named to the First Team All-SWAC.

== Professional career ==
Following his college career, McKnight signed with the Delaware Blue Coats of the NBA G League for training camp but did not make the final roster. He spent his rookie season with Sloboda Tuzla of the Basketball Championship of Bosnia and Herzegovina and the ABA League Second Division, averaging 10 points, three rebounds and three assists per game. On August 4, 2020, McKnight signed with BC Khimik of the Ukrainian Basketball SuperLeague. On August 6, 2021, he signed with the Manchester Giants of the British Basketball League.
