= Cameron Christon =

American basketball player

Cam Christon
No. 1 – Newcastle Eagles
- Position: Shooting guard
- League: Super League Basketball

Personal information
- Listed height: 6 ft 6 in (1.98 m)
- Listed weight: 190 lb (86 kg)

Career information
- High school: Allen (Allen, Texas)
- College: Boise State (2017–2018); Grambling State (2019–2023)
- NBA draft: 2023: undrafted
- Playing career: 2023–present

Career history
- 2023–2024: Cheshire Phoenix
- 2025–2026: Rayos de Hermosillo
- 2026: Bristol Flyers
- 2026-present: Newcastle Eagles

Career highlights
- BBL Trophy winner (2024); SWAC Player of the Year (2023); First-team All-SWAC (2023); 2× Second-team All-SWAC (2021, 2022)

Cameron "Cam" Christon is an American professional basketball player for Newcastle Eagles of Super League Basketball. He played college basketball for the Boise State Broncos and the Grambling State Tigers, and previously played in Super League Basketball and its predecessor, the British Basketball League, for Cheshire Phoenix and Bristol Flyers.

== High school career ==
Christon attended Allen High School where he played basketball and football. Playing wide receiver on the gridiron, he suffered a collarbone injury which ended his football career. As a senior, Christon averaged 15 points per game and earned District 6-6A Offensive MVP recognition. An unranked shooting guard, Christon committed to play college basketball at Boise State over Northern Iowa.

== College career ==
Christon appeared in 14 games as a freshman at Boise State and averaged two points per game. Following the season he transferred to Grambling State. As a junior, Christon averaged 13.7 points and 5.2 rebounds per game. He averaged 13.1 points, 3.8 rebounds, and 1.0 assist per game as a senior, earning Second Team all-SWAC honors. As a super-senior, Christon averaged 13 points, 5.4 rebounds, and 1.5 assists per game. At the conclusion of the season he was named SWAC Player of the Year.

== Professional career ==
After going undrafted in the 2023 NBA draft, Christon signed a contract with the Cheshire Phoenix on July 20, 2023. On January 28, 2024, Cheshire won the BBL Trophy.

== Personal life ==
Christon is the son of Ladonna and Tiger Christon. His father was a tight end at Grambling State under coach Eddie Robinson. Christon's older sister Amaya ran track at Tulsa and another sister Morgan plays volleyball at Texas A&M. Christon is a member of Kappa Alpha Psi fraternity.
