= Vernon Goodridge =

American basketball player

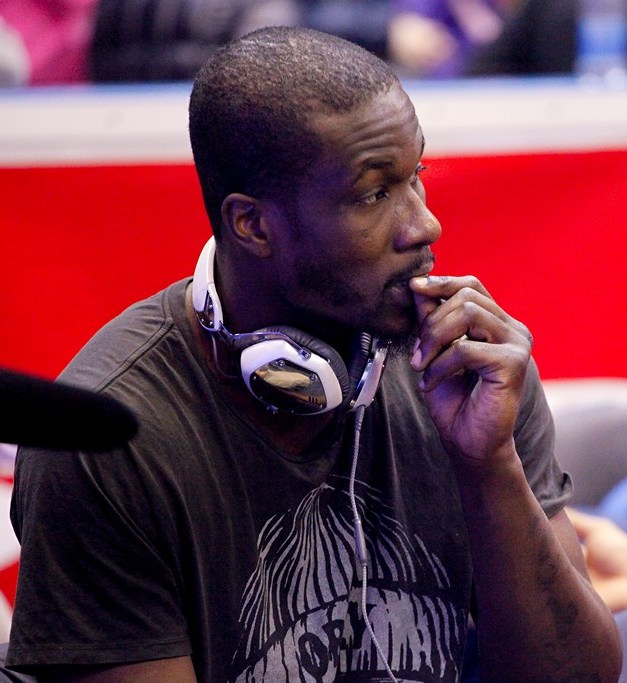
- Goodridge in 2012

Personal information
- Born: February 18, 1984 (age 42) Brooklyn, New York, U.S.
- Listed height: 6 ft 9 in (2.06 m)
- Listed weight: 242 lb (110 kg)

Career information
- High school: Lutheran Christian Academy (Brooklyn, New York)
- College: Mississippi State (2005–2007); La Salle (2008–2009)
- NBA draft: 2010: undrafted
- Playing career: 2010–2018
- Position: Power forward

Career history
- 2010–2011: Springfield Armor
- 2011: Maine Red Claws
- 2011–2012: BC Kyiv
- 2012–2013: Khimik Yuzhny
- 2013: Yeşilgiresun Belediye
- 2013–2014: Hapoel Kfar Saba
- 2014: La Bruixa d'Or Manresa
- 2014: AEK Athens
- 2014–2015: UniCEUB/BRB
- 2016: Piratas de Quebradillas
- 2016–2017: Indios de Ciudad Juárez
- 2017–2018: CS Antonins
- 2018: Bucaneros de La Guaira
- Stats at Basketball Reference

Vernon Goodridge (born February 18, 1984) is an American professional basketball player.

== College career ==
Goodridge attended Mississippi State University and La Salle University. He is from Brooklyn, New York.

== Professional career ==
Goodridge was the 5th overall pick in the 2010 NBA Development League Draft by the Springfield Armor. In 33 games with the Armor, Goodridge averaged 9 points and 5.4 rebounds in 23.2 minutes per game, after which he was traded to the Maine Red Claws for Eugene Spates.

In the summer of 2011, Goodridge signed with Argentinian team 9 de Julio de Río Tercero but left before making an appearance.

In September 2011, he signed a one-year deal with BC Kyiv of Ukraine. In July 2012, he signed with Khimik Yuzhny. In March 2013, he moved to Turkey and signed with Yeşilgiresun Belediye for the rest of the season.

In November 2013, he signed with Hapoel Kfar Saba of Israel. In January 2014, he moved to Spain and signed with La Bruixa d'Or Manresa for the rest of the season.

In September 2014, Goodridge signed with AEK Athens of Greece. He left AEK after only three games in the Greek League. In December 2014, he signed with UniCEUB/BRB of Brazil for the rest of the season.

On January 20, 2016, he signed with Piratas de Quebradillas of the Puerto Rican BSN.

In December 2016, he signed with Indios de Ciudad Juárez of the Liga Nacional de Baloncesto Profesional.

=== The Basketball Tournament ===
In 2017, Goodridge competed for The Washington Generals in The Basketball Tournament. The team lost in the round of 64.
