= Ken Evans Jr. =

American basketball player

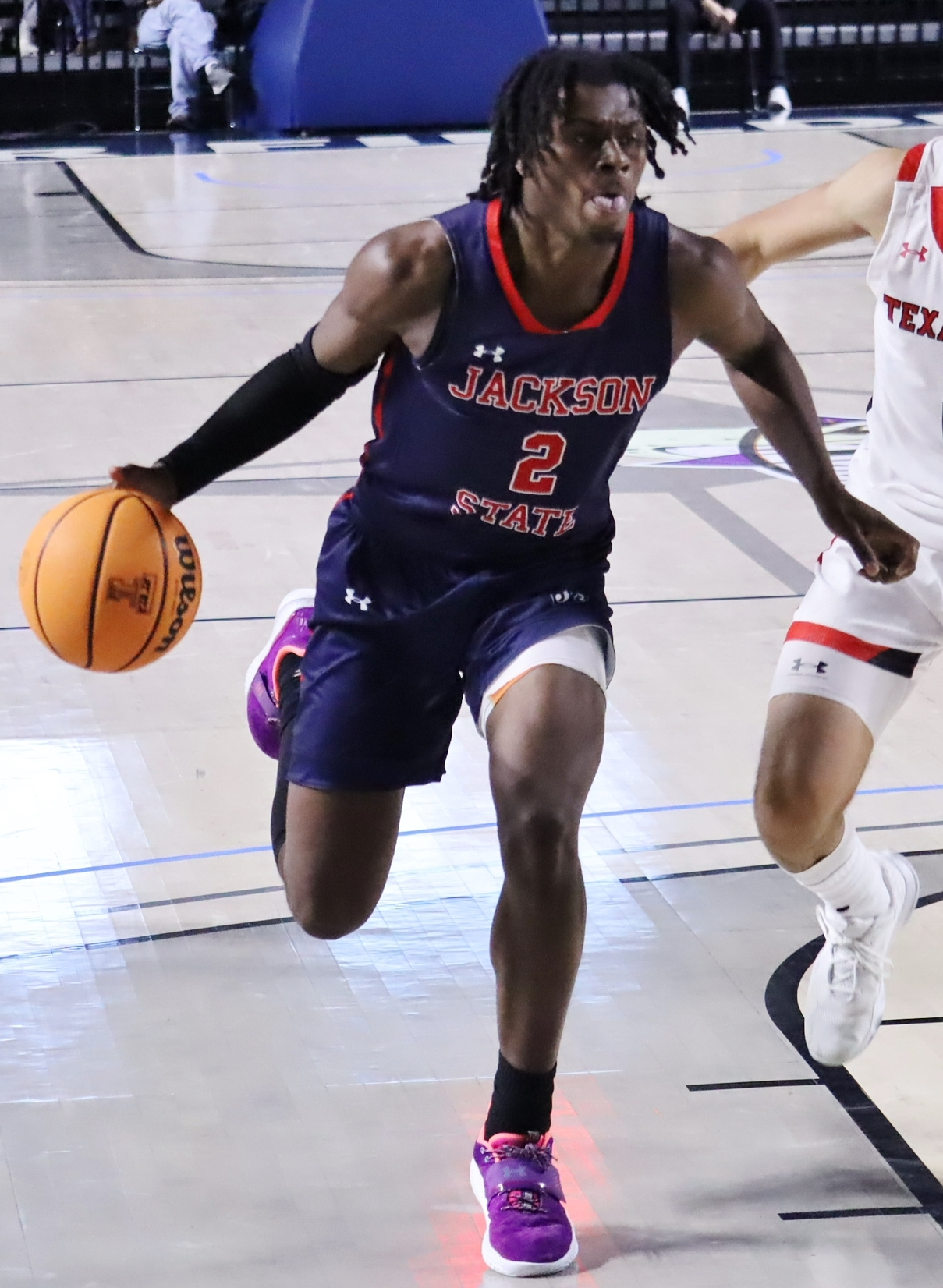
- Evans in 2022

Free agent
- Position: Shooting guard

Personal information
- Listed height: 6 ft 5 in (1.96 m)
- Listed weight: 205 lb (93 kg)

Career information
- High school: Forest Hill (Jackson, Mississippi)
- College: Jackson State (2020–2024); Florida Atlantic (2024–2025)
- NBA draft: 2025: undrafted

Career highlights
- SWAC Player of the Year (2024); First-team All-SWAC (2024)

Ken Evans Jr. is an American basketball player who played for the Florida Atlantic Owls and the Jackson State Tigers in NCAA Division I. Evans was the Southwestern Athletic Conference Player of the Year in 2024. He went undrafted in the 2025 NBA draft and is currently a free agent.

== High school career ==
Evans attended Forest Hill High School in Jackson, Mississippi. Both of his parents attended Jackson State, as did an aunt and a sister. Evans committed to play college basketball at Jackson State.

== College career ==
Evans redshirted his true freshman season. He averaged 4.6 points, 3.0 rebounds, and 1.4 assists per game as a redshirt freshman. As a sophomore, Evans averaged 8.0 points, 4.6 rebounds, and 2.1 assists per game. He averaged 11.3 points, 4.6 rebounds, and 2.7 assists per game as a junior. On March 7, 2024, Evans scored a career-high 37 points in an 89–84 victory over Arkansas–Pine Bluff. As a senior, he averaged 18.8 points, 5.4 rebounds, and 2.9 assists per game. Evans earned SWAC Player of the Year honors. Following the season, he entered the transfer portal and ultimately committed to Florida Atlantic.
