= Nathaniel Archibald (basketball, born 1952) =

American basketball player (1952–2018)

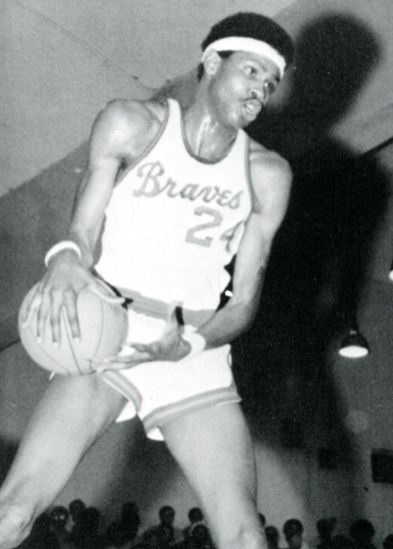
- Archibald as a junior with Alcorn State

Personal information
- Born: 1952
- Died: January 18, 2018 (aged 65) Northport, Alabama, U.S.
- Listed height: 6 ft 9 in (2.06 m)

Career information
- College: Alcorn State (1970–1974)
- NBA draft: 1974: undrafted
- Position: Center

Career highlights
- 2× NAIA All-American (1973, 1974); SWAC Player of the Year (1973); 2× First-team All-SWAC (1973, 1974)

Nathaniel Archibald (1952 – January 18, 2018) was an American basketball player. He is best known for his collegiate career with the Alcorn State Braves, with whom he was named the Southwestern Athletic Conference (SWAC) Player of the Year as a junior in 1973. He earned back-to-back first-team all-SWAC honors during his final two seasons. During his college career, Archibald scored 1,240 points and grabbed 968 rebounds. He went on to attend graduate school at Alcorn State University and spent time as an assistant coach for the basketball team.
