= Chad Lucas =

American football player (born 1981)

No. 10, 15, 83, 84
- Position: Wide receiver

Personal information
- Born: November 7, 1981 (age 45); Tuskegee, Alabama, U.S.
- Listed height: 6 ft 1 in (1.85 m)
- Listed weight: 201 lb (91 kg)

Career information
- High school: Booker T. Washington (Tuskegee)
- College: Alabama State
- NFL draft: 2004: undrafted

Career history
- Tennessee Titans (2004)*; San Jose SaberCats (2004)*; Green Bay Packers (2005); Amsterdam Admirals (2006); Tampa Bay Buccaneers (2006–2007); St. Louis Rams (2009)*; Toronto Argonauts (2009–2010); Omaha Nighthawks (2011)
- * Offseason or practice squad member only

Career NFL statistics
- Receptions: 5
- Receiving yards: 82
- Stats at Pro Football Reference

Chad Dennard Lucas (born November 7, 1981) is an American former professional football player who was a wide receiver in the National Football League (NFL) and Canadian Football League (CFL). He was signed by the Tennessee Titans as an undrafted free agent in 2004. He played college football for the Alabama State Hornets.

Lucas was also a member of the San Jose SaberCats, Green Bay Packers, Amsterdam Admirals, Tampa Bay Buccaneers, St. Louis Rams, Toronto Argonauts, and Omaha Nighthawks.

== Early life ==
Lucas was a three-sport athlete at Booker T. Washington High School in Tuskegee, Alabama, lettered in football, basketball and track. Competed in the state track tournament and was named to the All-Area team for basketball and football as a senior.

== College career ==
Lucas played two years at Troy State (2000–01) before finishing his college career at Alabama State (2002–03). He caught a team-high 46 passes for 794 yards and five touchdowns as he played in all 13 games as a 2003 senior. The year prior, saw action in five games, catching 13 passes for 142 yards. In 2001 at Troy State, caught six passes for 51 yards, and one reception for nine yards in 2000.

== Professional career ==
=== Pre-draft ===
Pre-draft measurables
Height	Weight	40-yard dash	20-yard shuttle	Three-cone drill	Vertical jump	Broad jump
6 ft 1 in (1.85 m)	201 lb (91 kg)	4.36 s	4.40s s	6.90 s	35 1/2 in (0.90 m)	9 ft 7 in (2.92 m)
All values from Alabama State Pro Day

=== Tennessee Titans ===
He began his professional career with the Tennessee Titans as a free agent on April 27, 2004, but was cut before the start of training camp on July 21, 2004.

=== San Jose SaberCats ===
He then went to the San Jose SaberCats of the Arena Football League to play summer ball.

=== Green Bay Packers ===
He was signed by the Green Bay Packers on June 7, 2005, and played in one game before being assigned to the practice squad. The Packers then sent Lucas to NFL Europe where he was selected in the 18th round of the Allocated Player Draft by the Amsterdam Admirals.

=== Amsterdam Admirals ===
Lucas was named All-NFL Europe as a member of the Amsterdam Admirals in 2006. He led NFL Europe with eight touchdown receptions, among 27 his catches for 440 yards and helping his team go to World Bowl XIV. Upon his return to the States, he did not do enough to make the Packers' starting roster and was released on August 29, 2006.

=== Tampa Bay Buccaneers ===
On October 18, 2006, the Tampa Bay Buccaneers signed Chad to their practice squad. An exclusive-rights free agent in the 2008 off season, Lucas signed his one-year tender offer from the Buccaneers on June 22.

=== St. Louis Rams ===
Lucas was signed by the St. Louis Rams on March 17, 2009. He was waived on July 23, 2009.

=== Toronto Argonauts ===
On July 28, 2009, Lucas was signed by the Toronto Argonauts of the Canadian Football League. He was released by the Argonauts on September 16, 2010.

=== Omaha Nighthawks ===
Lucas was signed by the Omaha Nighthawks of the United Football League on June 29, 2011.
