= Booker T. Washington High School (Tuskegee, Alabama) =

Public high school in Tuskegee, Alabama, United States

Coordinates: 32°24′02″N 85°44′01″W

Booker T. Washington High is a public high school in Tuskegee, Alabama. Its student body is more than 95 percent Black American and according to U.S. News 100 percent of students are economically disadvantaged. It is named for Booker T. Washington. The school mascot is the Golden Eagle. It opened in 1992 in a merger of Tuskegee Institute High, South Macon High School, and D.C. Wolfe High School. The school has faced declining enrollment.

Booker T. Washington High School is at 3803 W. MLK Hwy in Tuskegee. The school colors are purple and gold.

== History ==
The school opened after Tuskegee Institute closed.

== Athletics ==
Maurice Heard coached the football team for 10 years. He played football at Tuskegee University and was inducted into its hall of fame for his achievements as a quarterback. He was succeeded by Lawrence A. O’Neal in 2021.

== Alumni ==
- Chad Lucas
- Zeke Moore
- Frank Walker
