= Alabama A&M Bulldogs basketball =

Men's college basketball team

Alabama A&M Bulldogs
2026–27 Alabama A&M Bulldogs basketball team
- University: Alabama A&M University
- Head coach: Donte Jackson (2nd season)
- Location: Huntsville, Alabama
- Arena: Alabama A&M Events Center (capacity: 6,000)
- Conference: SWAC
- Nickname: Bulldogs
- Colors: Maroon and white

NCAA Division I tournament Elite Eight
- D-II: 1988, 1994, 1995, 1996
Other NCAA Division I tournament results
Appearances	D-II: 1985, 1986, 1987, 1988, 1989, 1993, 1994, 1995, 1996, 1997; D-I: 2005

Conference tournament champions
- SIAC: 1975, 1976, 1986, 1987, 1988, 1989, 1993, 1995, 1996; SWAC: 2005

Conference regular-season champions
- SIAC: 1975, 1976, 1986, 1987, 1988, 1989, 1993, 1994, 1995, 1996; SWAC: 2005

Uniforms
Home	Away

The Alabama A&M Bulldogs basketball team is the men's basketball team that represents Alabama Agricultural and Mechanical University (Alabama A&M) in Normal, Alabama. The school's team currently competes in the Southwestern Athletic Conference (SWAC) and are led by head coach Donte Jackson. Prior to the Bulldogs' move to NCAA Division I in 1998, the team was a member of the Southern Intercollegiate Athletic Conference and a consistent presence in the NCAA Division II Tournament. The Bulldogs were coached by L. Vann Pettaway from 1986 to 2010. During his tenure, Pettaway amassed a 440–264 record with the a school-best 28–3 in 1992–93 and 1995–96. From 1992 to 1997, the Bulldogs went 136–20. Their rivals are the Alabama State Hornets.

== NCAA record holders ==
Desmond Cambridge holds the NCAA Division I record for all-time steals in a single season, and highest steals per game average for a season. Obie Trotter is fourth all-time single season steals. Mickell Gladness is second all-time in blocks in a season. Gladness set a Division I single game record with 16 blocks against Texas Southern on February 24, 2007. No other player in Division I history has even recorded 15 blocks in a single game.

== Postseason ==
=== NCAA Division I tournament ===
The Bulldogs have appeared in the NCAA tournament one time, garnering a record of 0–1.

Year	Seed	Round	Opponent	Result
2005	#16	Opening Round	#16 Oakland	L 69–79

=== NCAA Division II tournament ===
Alabama A&M made ten appearances in the NCAA Division II men's basketball tournament, with the Bulldogs garnering a record of 9–10.

Year	Round	Opponent	Result
1985	Regional semifinals	Southeast Missouri State	L 74–85
1986	Regional semifinals	Tampa	L 69–76
1987	Regional semifinals	Florida A&M	L 83–92
1988	Regional semifinals Regional Final; National Quarterfinals	Ashland; Kentucky Wesleyan; Lowell	W 75–73^{OT} W 92–88; L 68–76
1989	Regional semifinals	Virginia Union	L 80–116
1993	Regional semifinals	North Carolina Central	L 84–93
1994	Regional semifinals Regional Final; Elite Eight	Paine; Tampa; New Hampshire College	W 110–106^{2OT} W 95–90; L 90–100
1995	Regional semifinals Regional Final; Elite Eight	Eckerd; Tampa; Norfolk State	W 75–50; W 79–78; L 67–85
1996	Region Semifinals; Region Finals; Elite Eight	South Carolina-Spartanburg; Columbus; California (PA)	W 106–91; W 98–82; L 85–95
1997	Region Semifinals; Region Finals	Delta State; Lynn	W 81–80; L 82–87

== Notable players ==
- Maurice Kemp (born 1999), power forward
- Nigel Moore (born 1981), shooting guard / small forward, the Finnish First Division
- Frank Sillmon (born 1965), small forward, Finland
- Obie Trotter (born 1984), point guard / shooting guard, Icelandic top division
