= Southern Jaguars basketball =

Southern Jaguars men's basketball
| 2026–27 Southern Jaguars basketball team |
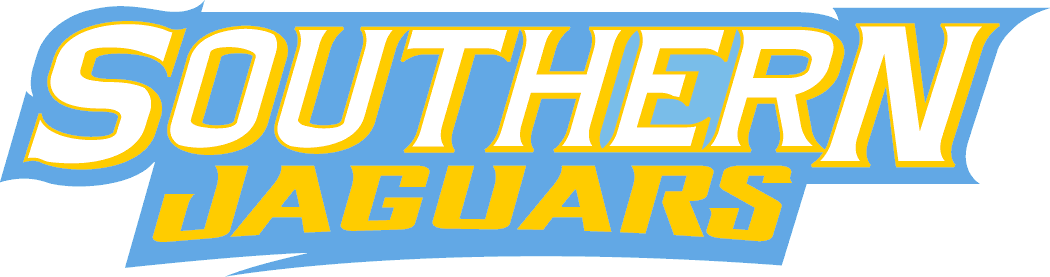
- University: Southern University
- Head coach: Kevin Johnson (4th season)
- Location: Baton Rouge, Louisiana
- Arena: F. G. Clark Center (capacity: 7,500)
- Conference: SWAC
- Nickname: Jaguars
- Colors: Columbia blue and gold

NCAA Division I tournament appearances
- 1981, 1985, 1987, 1988, 1989, 1993, 2006, 2013, 2016

Conference tournament champions
- 1974*, 1975*, 1977*, 1981, 1985, 1987, 1988, 1989, 1993, 2006, 2013, 2016

Conference regular-season champions
- 1951, 1952, 1953, 1954, 1965, 1978, 1981, 1986, 1988, 1989, 1990, 2006, 2014, 2025
- * at Division II level

The Southern Jaguars basketball team is the basketball team that represents Southern University in Baton Rouge, Louisiana, United States. The school's team currently competes in the Southwestern Athletic Conference. Southern has appeared nine times in the NCAA tournament, most recently in 2016.

== Postseason results ==
=== NCAA Division I tournament ===
The Jaguars have appeared in the NCAA tournament nine times, the second most appearances of any SWAC school. Their combined record is 1–9. They were the second (after Alcorn State in 1980) and, as of 2022, the most recent SWAC team to advance to the regional quarterfinals, or Round of 32. Their #13 seed in the 1993 tournament is the highest seed given to a SWAC team since the tournament expanded to 64 teams in 1985.

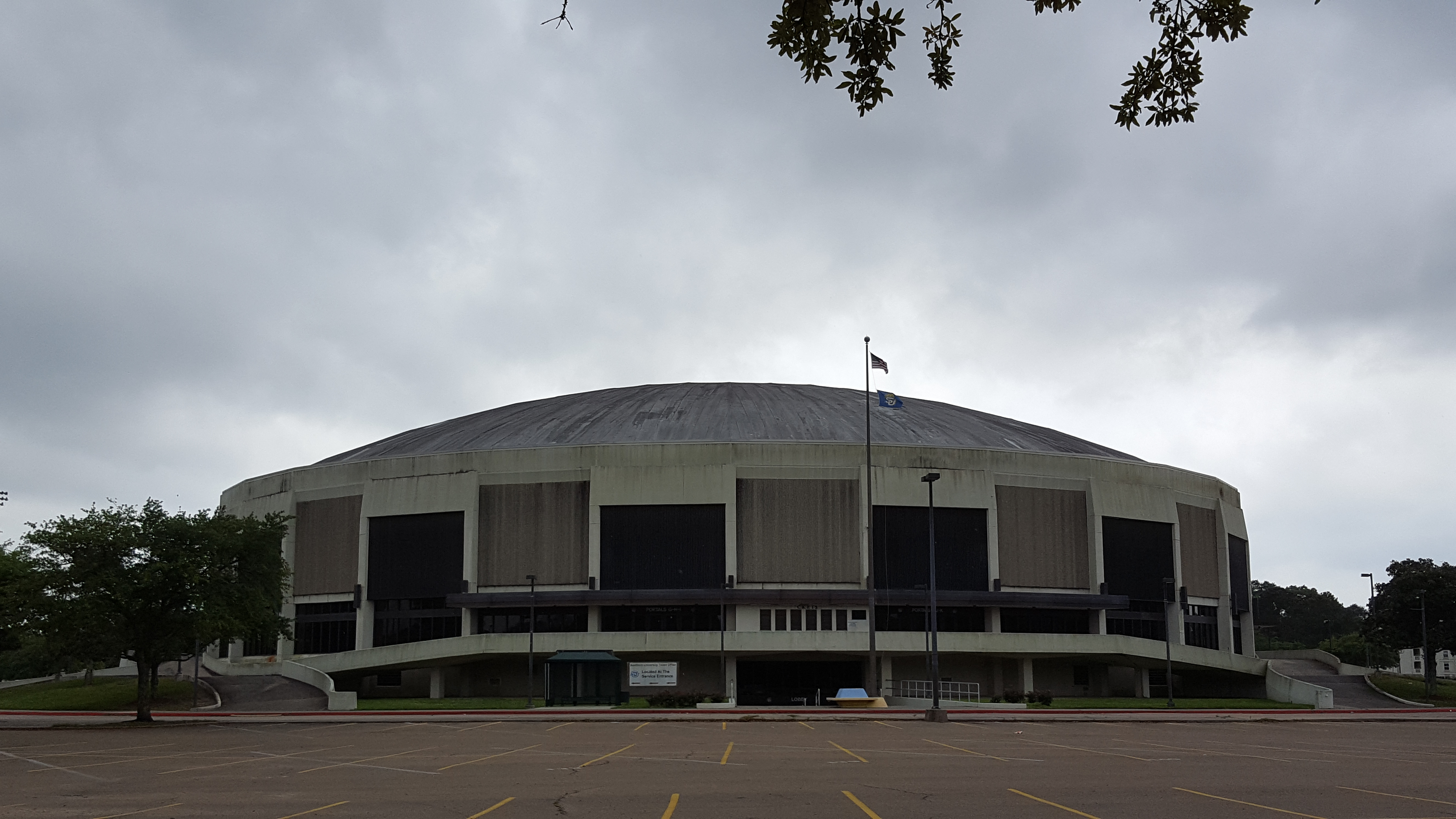
F. G. Clark Center

| Year | Seed | Round | Opponent | Result |
|---|---|---|---|---|
| 1981 | 11 | First Round | Wichita State | L 70–95 |
| 1985 | 16 | First Round | St. John's | L 59–83 |
| 1987 | 15 | First Round | Temple | L 56–75 |
| 1988 | 15 | First Round | Kentucky | L 84–99 |
| 1989 | 15 | First Round | North Carolina | L 79–93 |
| 1993 | 13 | First Round; Second Round | Georgia Tech; George Washington | W 93–78; L 80–90 |
| 2006 | 16 | First Round | Duke | L 54–70 |
| 2013 | 16 | First Round | Gonzaga | L 58–64 |
| 2016 | 16 | First Four | Holy Cross | L 55–59 |

=== NCAA Division II tournament ===
The Jaguars appeared in the NCAA Division II men's basketball tournament three times. They had a record of 1–5.

| Year | Round | Opponent | Result |
|---|---|---|---|
| 1974 | Regional Semifinals; Regional Third Place | New Orleans; Tennessee State | L 80–85; L 88–98 |
| 1975 | Regional Semifinals; Regional Third Place | Lincoln (MO); West Georgia | L 87–93; W 103–98 |
| 1977 | Regional Semifinals; Regional Third Place | North Alabama; Lincoln | L 88–105; L 87–103 |

=== NIT results ===
The Jaguars have appeared in the National Invitation Tournament (NIT) one time. Their record is 0–1.

| Year | Round | Opponent | Result |
|---|---|---|---|
| 1990 | First Round | Fordham | L 80–106 |

=== NAIA results ===
The Jaguars appeared in the National Association of Intercollegiate Athletics (NAIA) Basketball Tournament one time. Their record is 2–1.

| Year | Round | Opponent | Result |
|---|---|---|---|
| 1965 | First Round; Second Round; Quarter Finals | Indiana Tech; Eastern Montana; Ouachita Baptist (Ark.) | W 94–77; W 97–86; L 64–65 |

=== Retired numbers ===
The Jaguars have retired three numbers.

Southern Jaguars retired jerseys
| No. | Player | Career | Year of Retirement |
| 15 | Avery Johnson | 1986–88 | 2012 |
| 34 | Bobby Phills | 1987–91 | 2012 |
| 41 | Bob Love | 1961–65 | 2012 |

== See also ==
- List of NCAA Division I men's basketball programs
