= List of sports-related people from Mississippi =

This list contains sportspersons, coaches, and other sports-related people who were born or lived in the U.S. state of Mississippi. For other groups, see List of people from Mississippi.

== Baseball ==
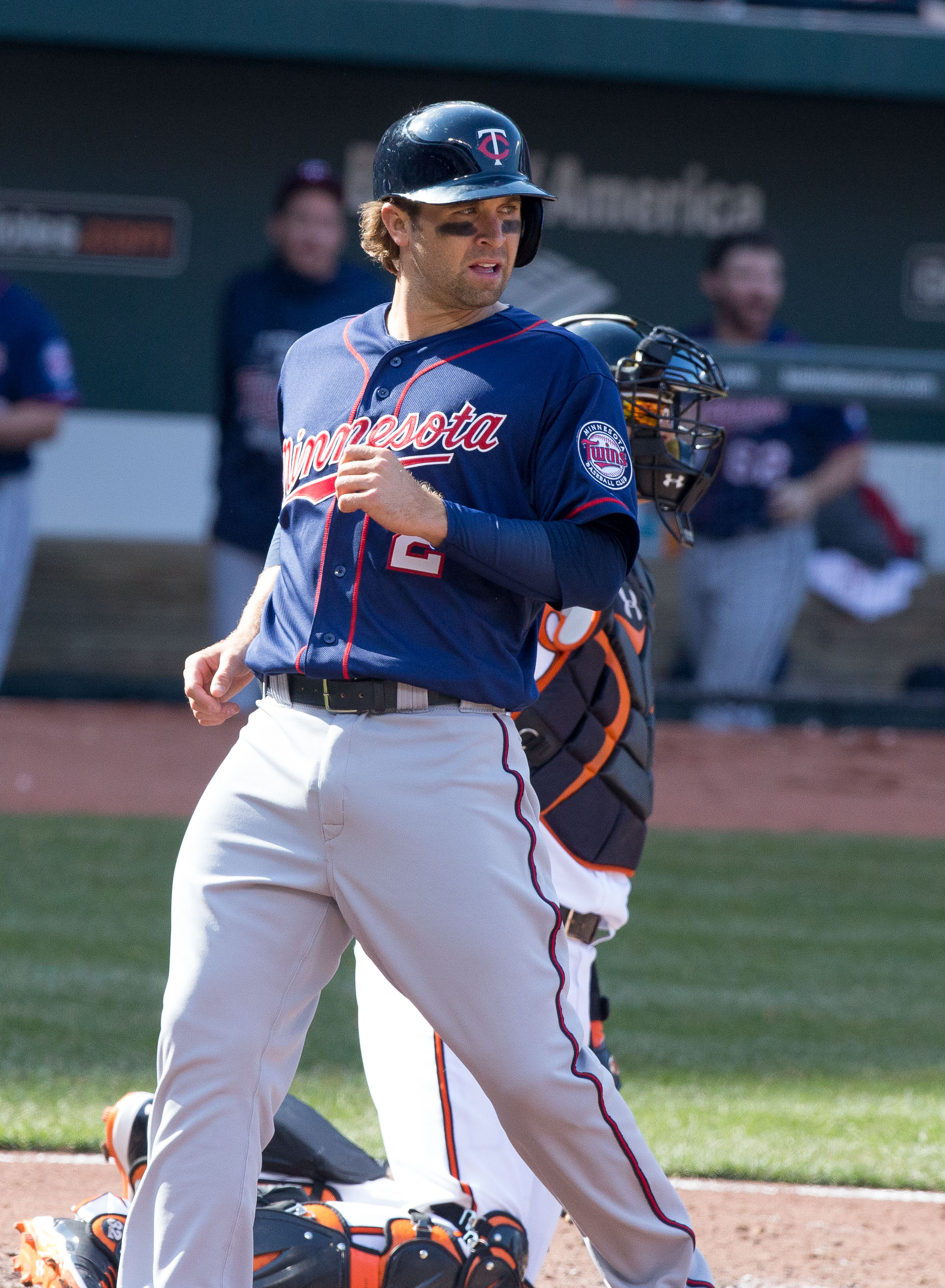
Brian Dozier

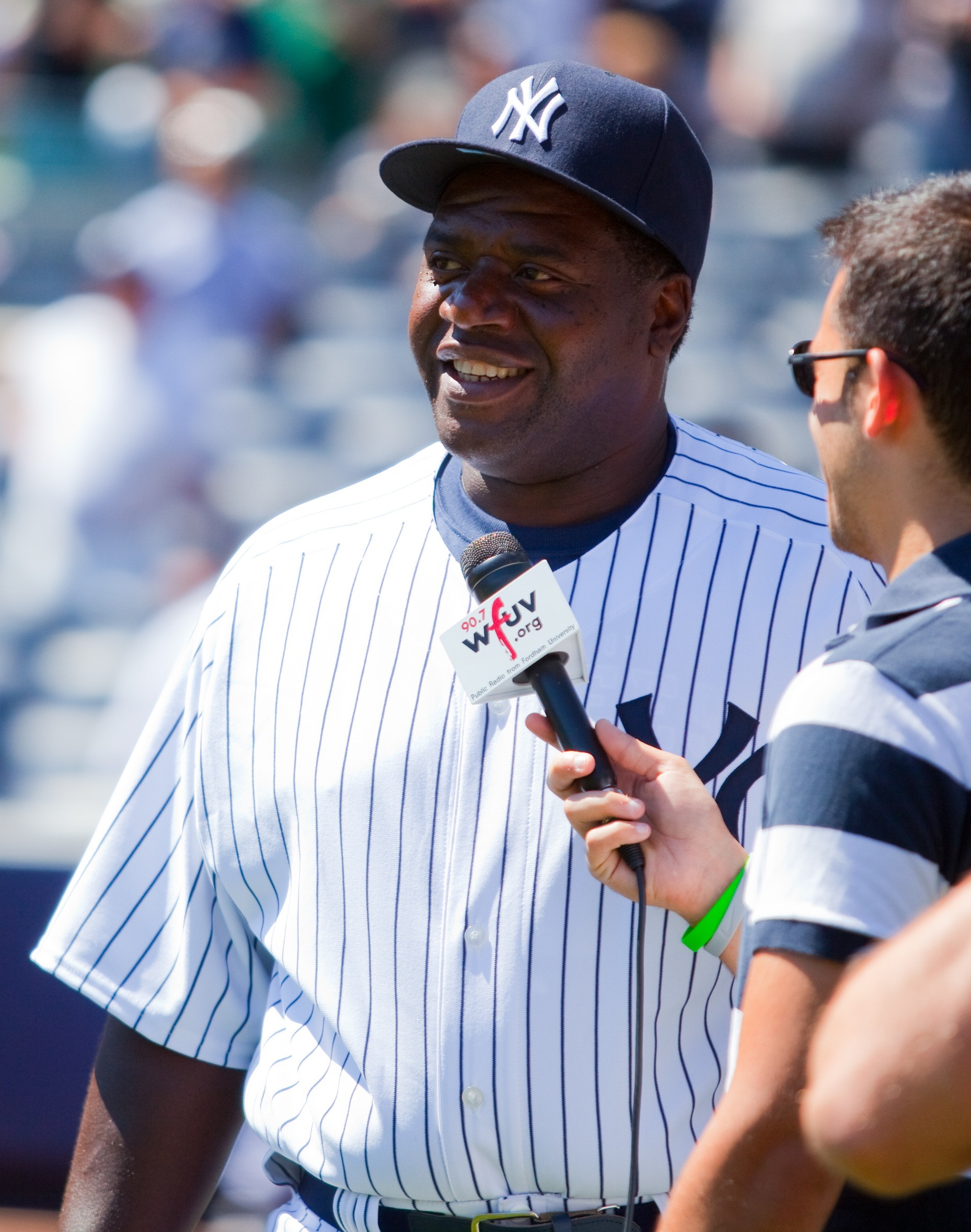
Charlie Hayes

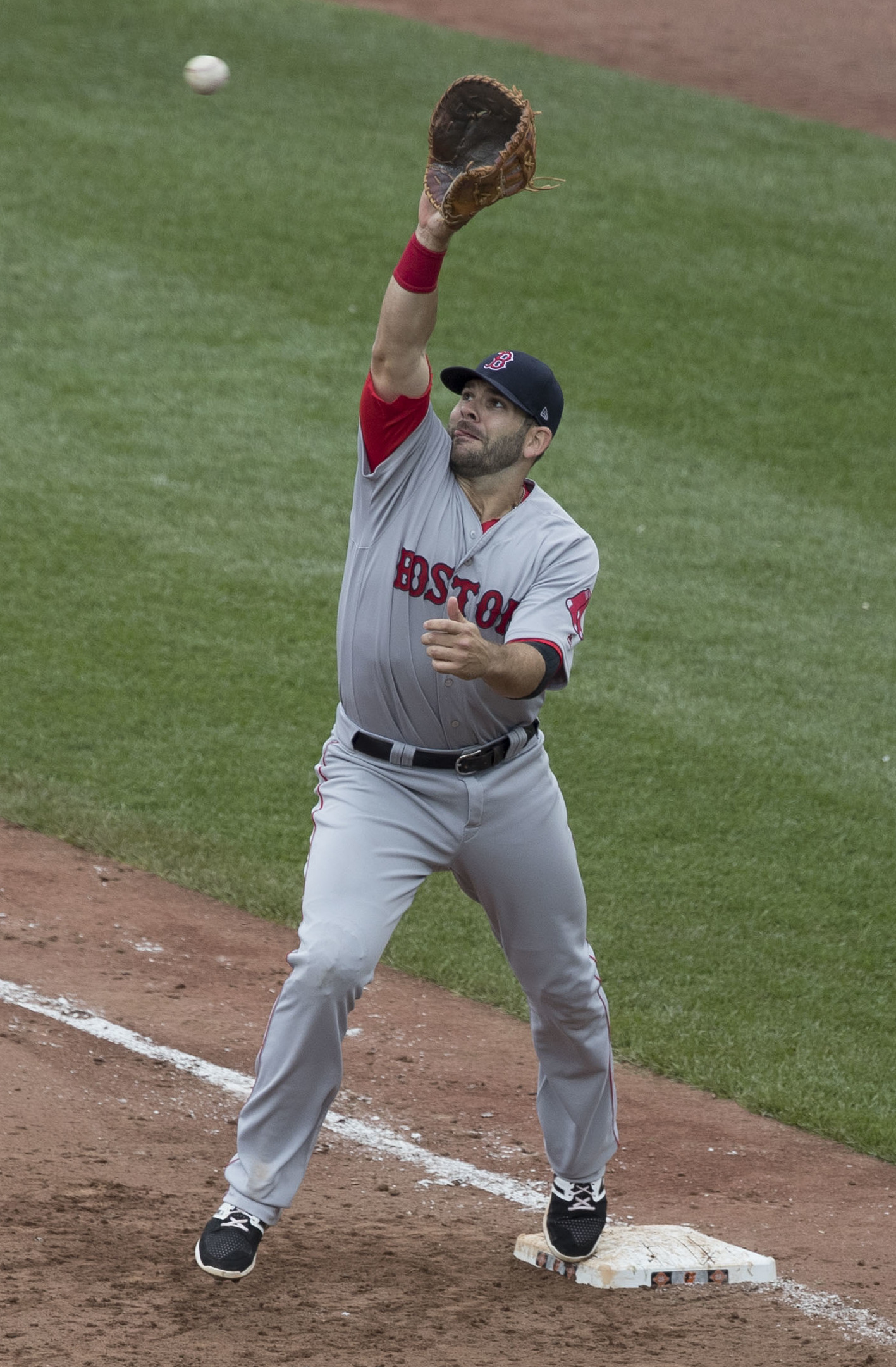
Mitch Moreland

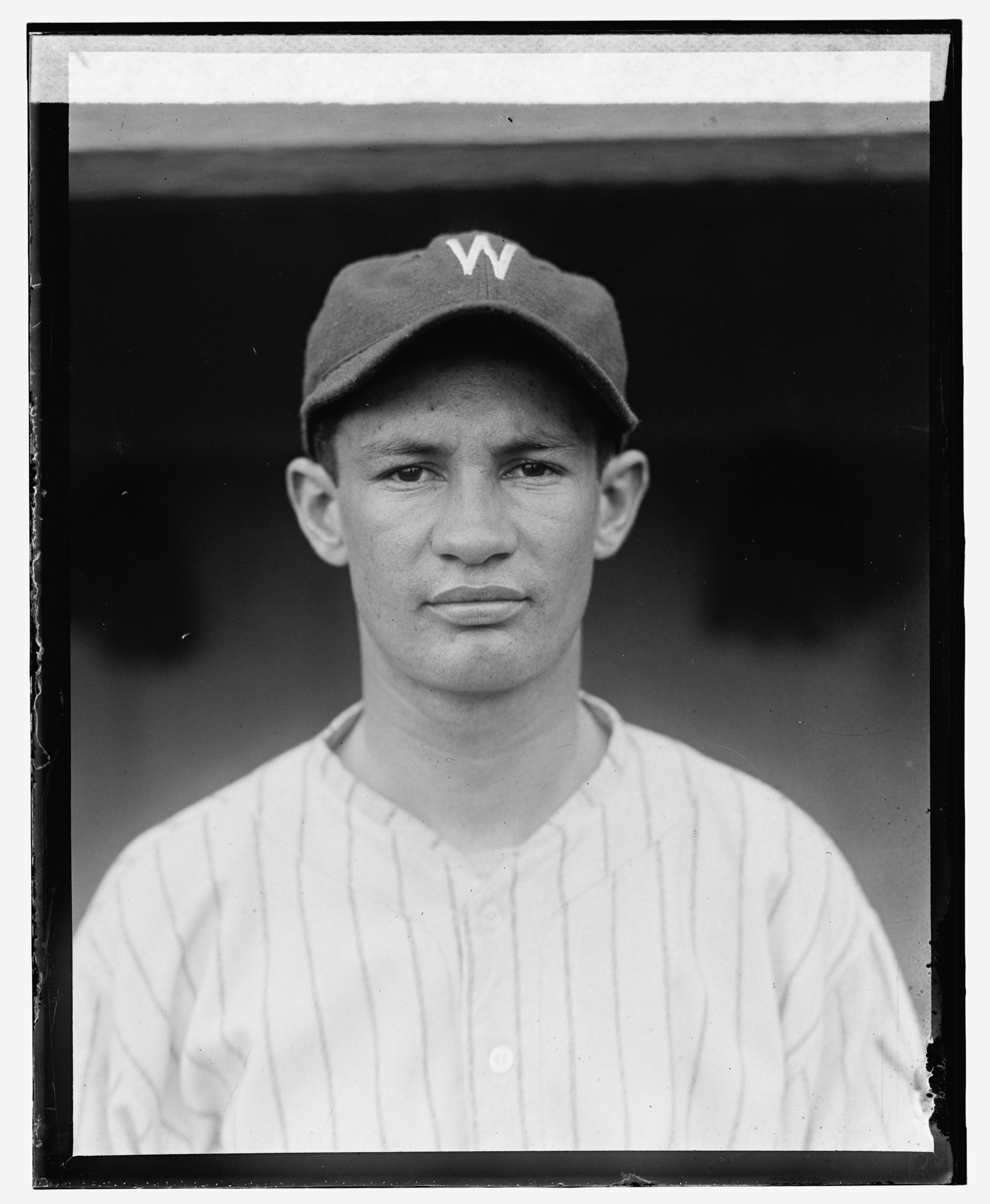
Buddy Myer

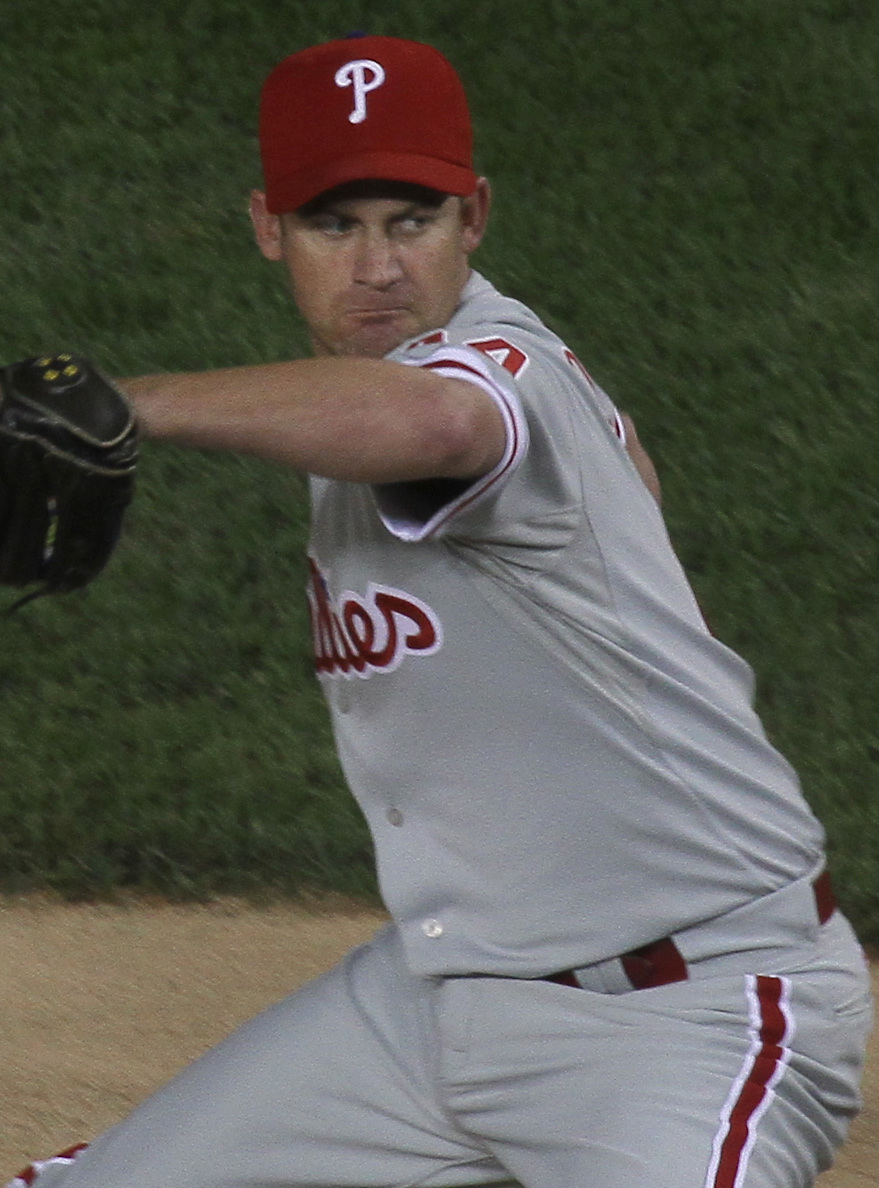
Roy Oswalt

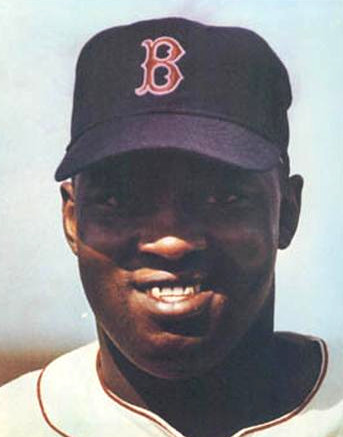
George Scott

- Frank Baker (born 1946), shortstop (Meridian)
- Howard Battle (born 1972), third baseman (Biloxi)
- Cool Papa Bell (1903–1991), center fielder (Starkville)
- Don Blasingame (1932–2005), second baseman (Corinth)
- Milt Bolling (1930–2013), shortstop (Mississippi City)
- Josh Booty (born 1975), third baseman (Starkville)
- Julio Borbon (born 1986), outfielder (Starkville)
- Dennis Ray "Oil Can" Boyd (born 1959), pitcher (Meridian)
- Chad Bradford (born 1974), pitcher (Jackson)
- Jeff Branson (born 1967), infielder (Waynesboro)
- Jeff Brantley (born 1963), pitcher and ESPN analyst (Starkville)
- Adrian Brown (born 1974), center fielder (McComb)
- Jamie Brown (born 1977), pitcher (Meridian)
- Ellis Burks (born 1964), outfielder and designated hitter (Vicksburg)
- Guy Bush (1901–1985), pitcher (Aberdeen)
- Joey Butler (born 1986), outfielder (Pascagoula)
- Louis Coleman (born 1986), relief pitcher (Greenwood)
- Dewon Day (born 1980), relief pitcher (Jackson)
- Dizzy Dean (1910–1974), pitcher (Bond)
- Tommy Dean (born 1945), shortstop (Iuka)
- Corey Dickerson (born 1989), outfielder
- Bob Didier (born 1949), catcher (Hattiesburg)
- Brian Dozier (born 1987), infielder (Fulton)
- Hayden Dunhurst (born 2000), catcher (Carriere)
- Jarrod Dyson (born 1984), outfielder (McComb)
- David "Boo" Ferriss (1921–2016), pitcher (Shaw)
- Curt Ford (born 1960), outfielder (Jackson)
- Joey Gathright (born 1981), minor league outfielder (Hattiesburg)
- Joe Gibbon (1935–2019), pitcher (Hickory)
- Jake Gibbs (born 1938), catcher (Grenada)
- Rod Gilbreath (born 1954), second baseman (Laurel)
- Luther Hackman (born 1974), pitcher (Columbus)
- Bill Hall (born 1979), third baseman (Nettleton)
- Billy Hamilton (born 1990), center fielder (Taylorsville)
- Mickey Harrington (1934–2017), pinch-runner (Hattiesburg)
- Charlie Hayes (born 1965), third baseman (Hattiesburg)
- Larry Herndon (born 1953), outfielder (Sunflower)
- Jarrett Hoffpauir (born 1983), second baseman (Natchez)
- Jonathan Holder (1993), relief pitcher (Gulfport)
- TJ House (born 1989), pitcher (Picayune)
- Dusty Hughes (born 1982), relief pitcher (Tupelo)
- Cleo James (born 1940), outfielder (Clarksdale)
- Matt Lawton (born 1971), right fielder (Gulfport)
- Brent Leach (born 1982), relief pitcher (Flowood)
- Chet Lemon (born 1955), outfielder (Jackson)
- Ronnie Lester (born 1959), player, assistant general manager (Canton)
- Fred Lewis (born 1980), left fielder (Hattiesburg)
- Jacob Lindgren (born 1993), pitcher (Bay St. Louis)
- John Lindsey (born 1977), minor league first baseman (Hattiesburg)
- Nook Logan (born 1979), center fielder (Natchez)
- Barry Lyons (born 1960), catcher (Biloxi)
- Paul Maholm (born 1982), starting pitcher (Greenwood)
- Chris Maloney (born 1961), minor league player, manager (Jackson)
- Brian Maxcy (born 1971), pitcher (Amory)
- Allen McDill (born 1971), left-handed specialist pitcher (Greenville)
- Bill Melton (born 1945), third baseman (Gulfport)
- Matt Miller (born 1971), pitcher 2003–2007 (Greenwood)
- Dustan Mohr (born 1976), outfielder (Hattiesburg)
- Tyler Moore (born 1987), first baseman and outfielder (Brandon)
- Mitch Moreland (born 1985), first baseman and outfielder (Amory)
- Buddy Myer (1904–1974), second baseman (Ellisville)
- Ryan Nye (born 1973), pitcher (Biloxi)
- Roy Oswalt (born 1977), starting pitcher (Weir)
- Dave Parker (born 1951), right fielder and designated hitter (Jackson)
- Claude Passeau (1909–2003), pitcher (Lucedale)
- Gary Rath (born 1973), starting pitcher (Gulfport)
- Hunter Renfroe (born 1992), outfielder (Crystal Springs
- Kevin Rogers (born 1968), pitcher (Cleveland)
- Nate Rolison (born 1977), first baseman (Petal)
- Reb Russell (1889–1973), pitcher (Jackson)
- George Scott (1944–2013), first baseman (Greenville)
- Kim Seaman (born 1957), pitcher (Pascagoula)
- Tony Sipp (born 1983), relief pitcher (Moss Point)
- Matt Skrmetta (born 1972), pitcher (Biloxi)
- Jason Smith (born 1977), infielder (Meridian)
- Seth Smith (born 1982), outfielder (Jackson)
- Justin Steele (born 1995), pitcher (Lucedale)
- Blake Stein (born 1973), pitcher (McComb)
- Craig Tatum (born 1983), catcher (Hattiesburg)
- Marcus Thames (born 1977), outfielder and first baseman (Louisville)
- John Thomson (born 1973), starting pitcher (Vicksburg)
- Matt Tolbert (born 1982), infielder (born in McComb, raised in Woodville)
- Eddie "Scooter" Tucker (born 1966), catcher (Greenville)
- Jermaine Van Buren (born 1980), relief pitcher (Laurel)
- Chico Walker (born 1957), second base (Jackson)
- Harry Walker (1916–1999), outfielder and manager (Pascagoula)
- Skeeter Webb (1909–1986), infielder (Meridian)
- Barry Wesson (born 1977), outfielder (Tupelo)
- Frank White (born 1950), second baseman and coach (Greenville)
- Eli Whiteside (born 1979), catcher (New Albany)
- Dmitri Young (born 1973), first baseman (Vicksburg)
- Tim Young (born 1973), relief pitcher (Gulfport)
- Walter Young (1980–2015), first baseman (Hattiesburg)

== Basketball ==
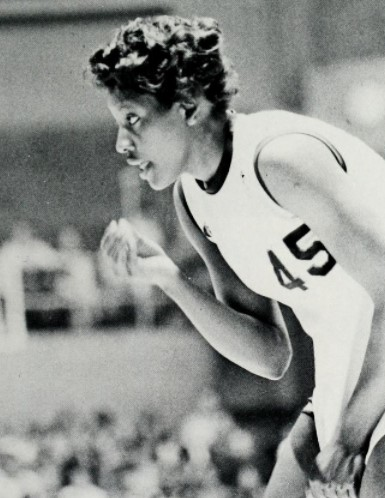
Lusia Harris

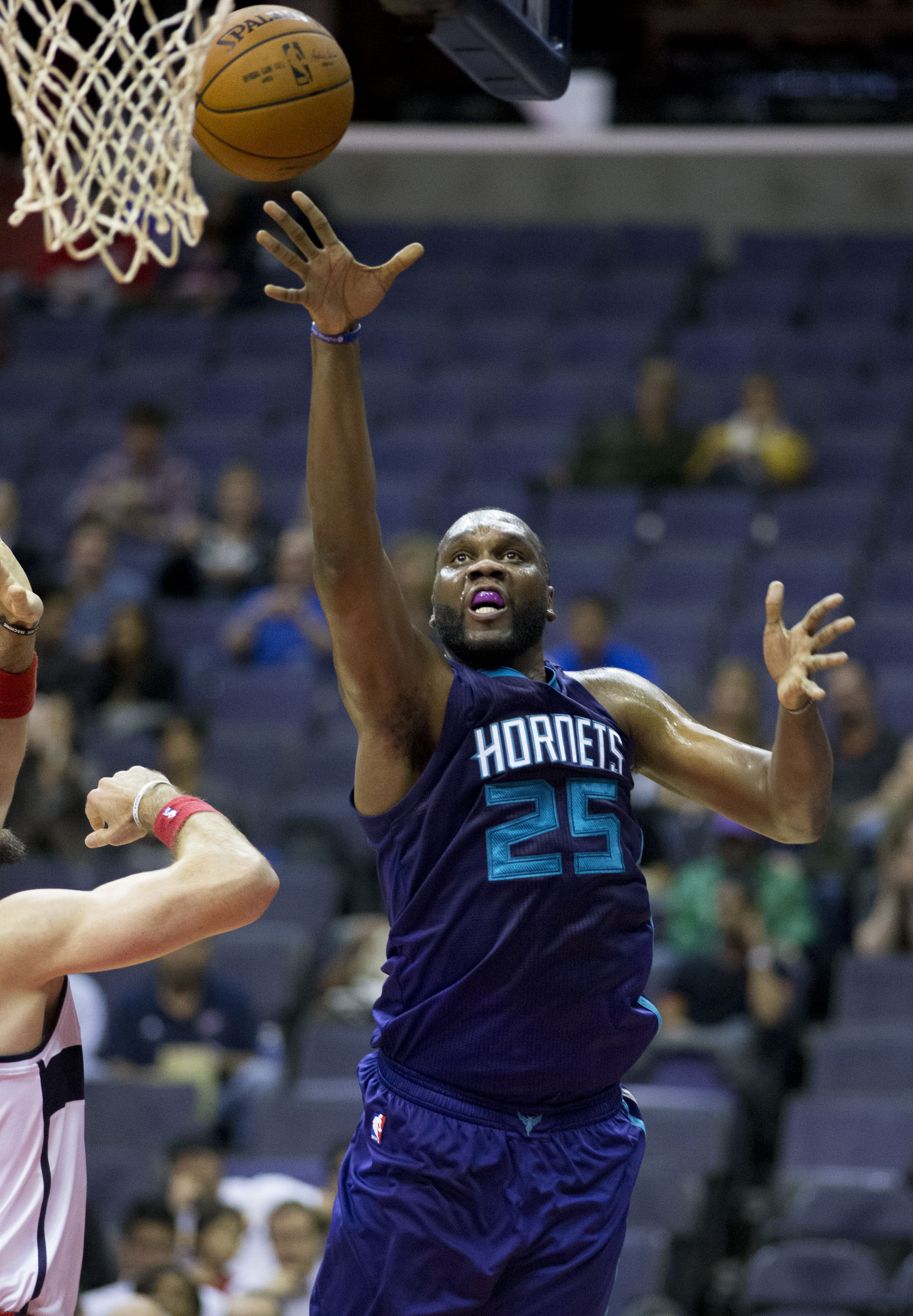
Al Jefferson

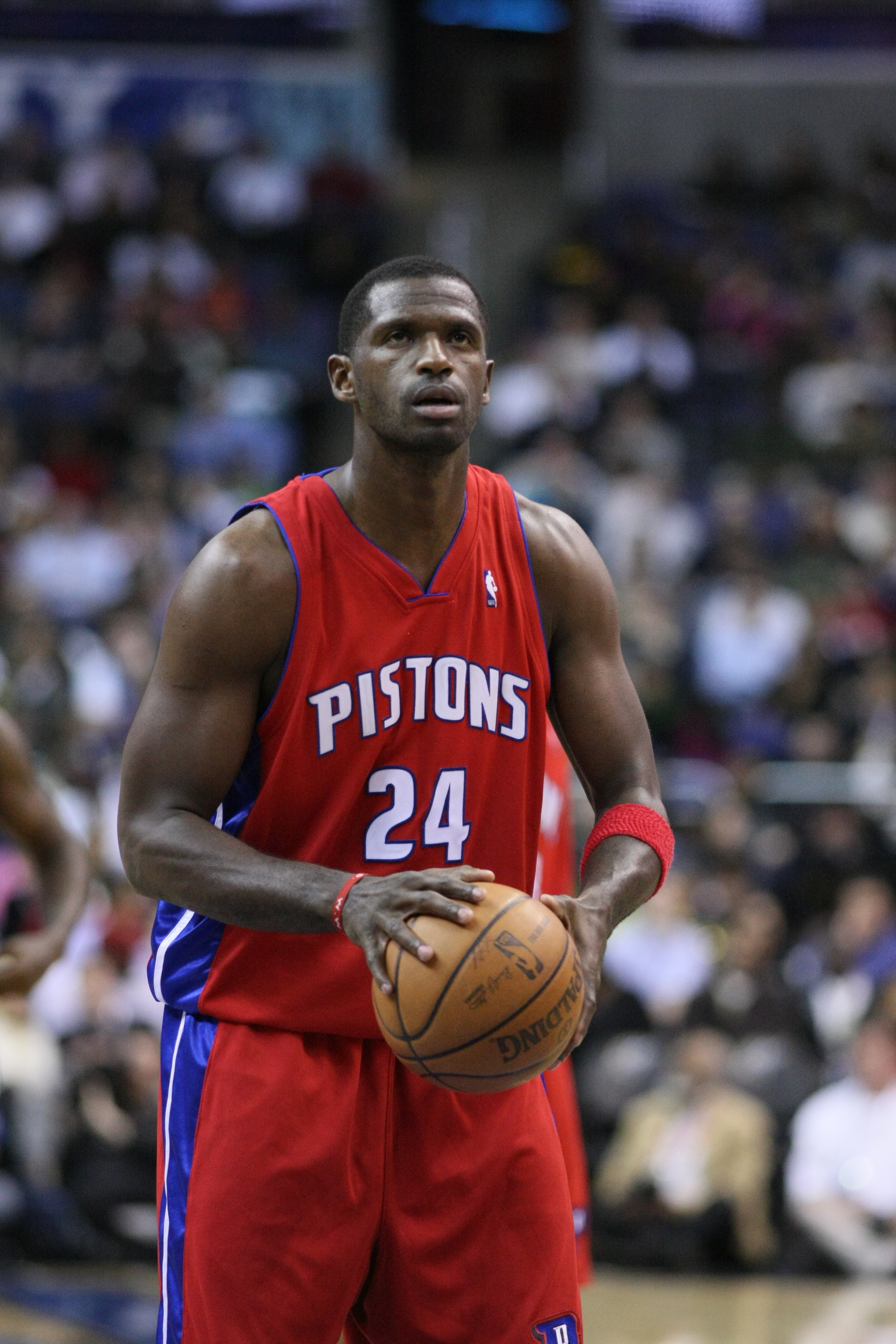
Antonio McDyess

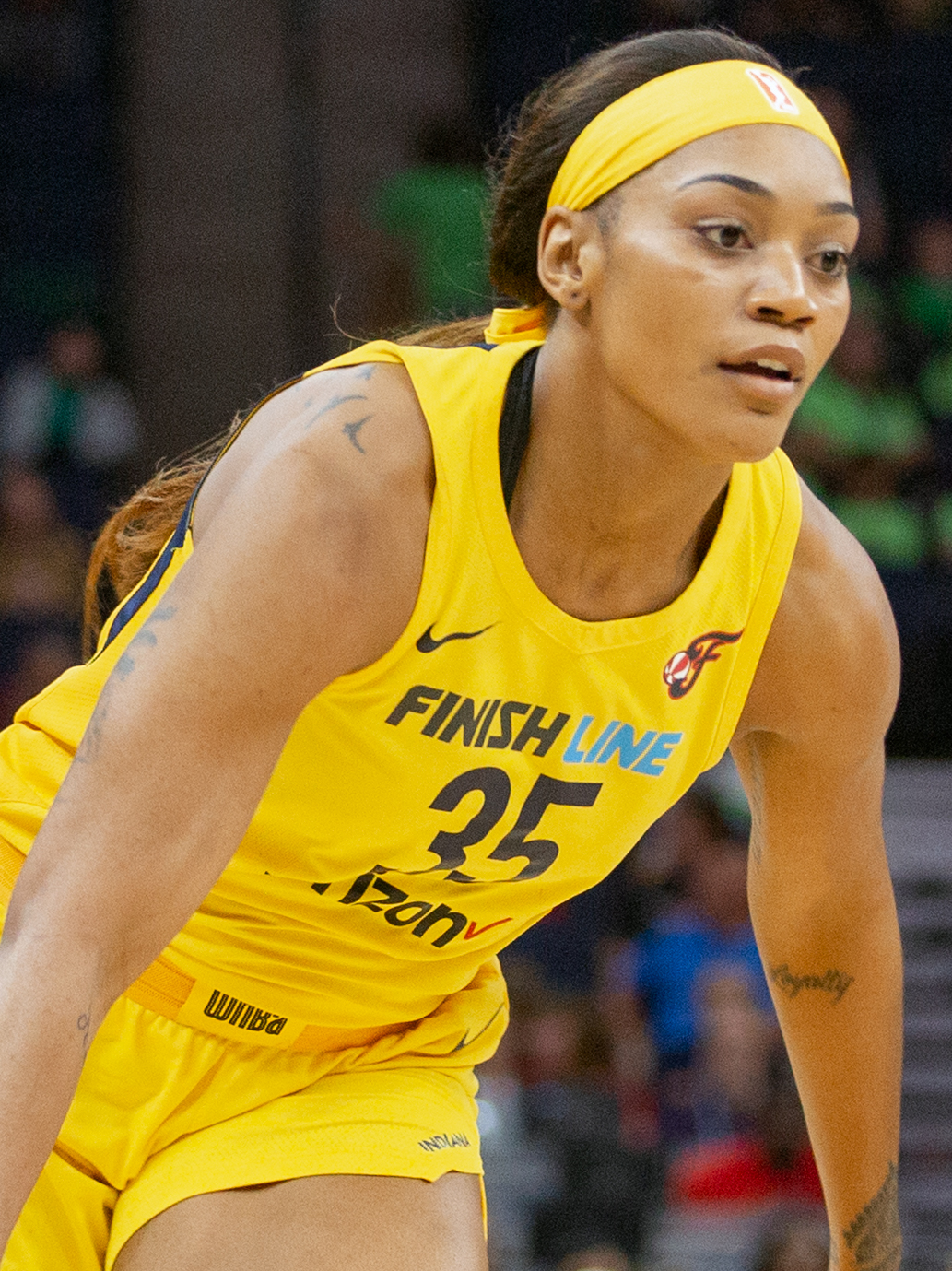
Victoria Vivians

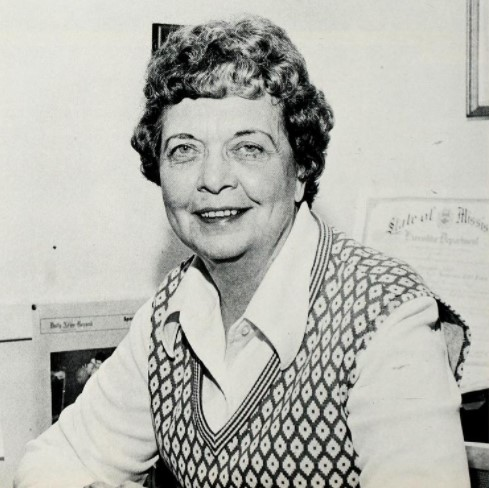
Margaret Wade

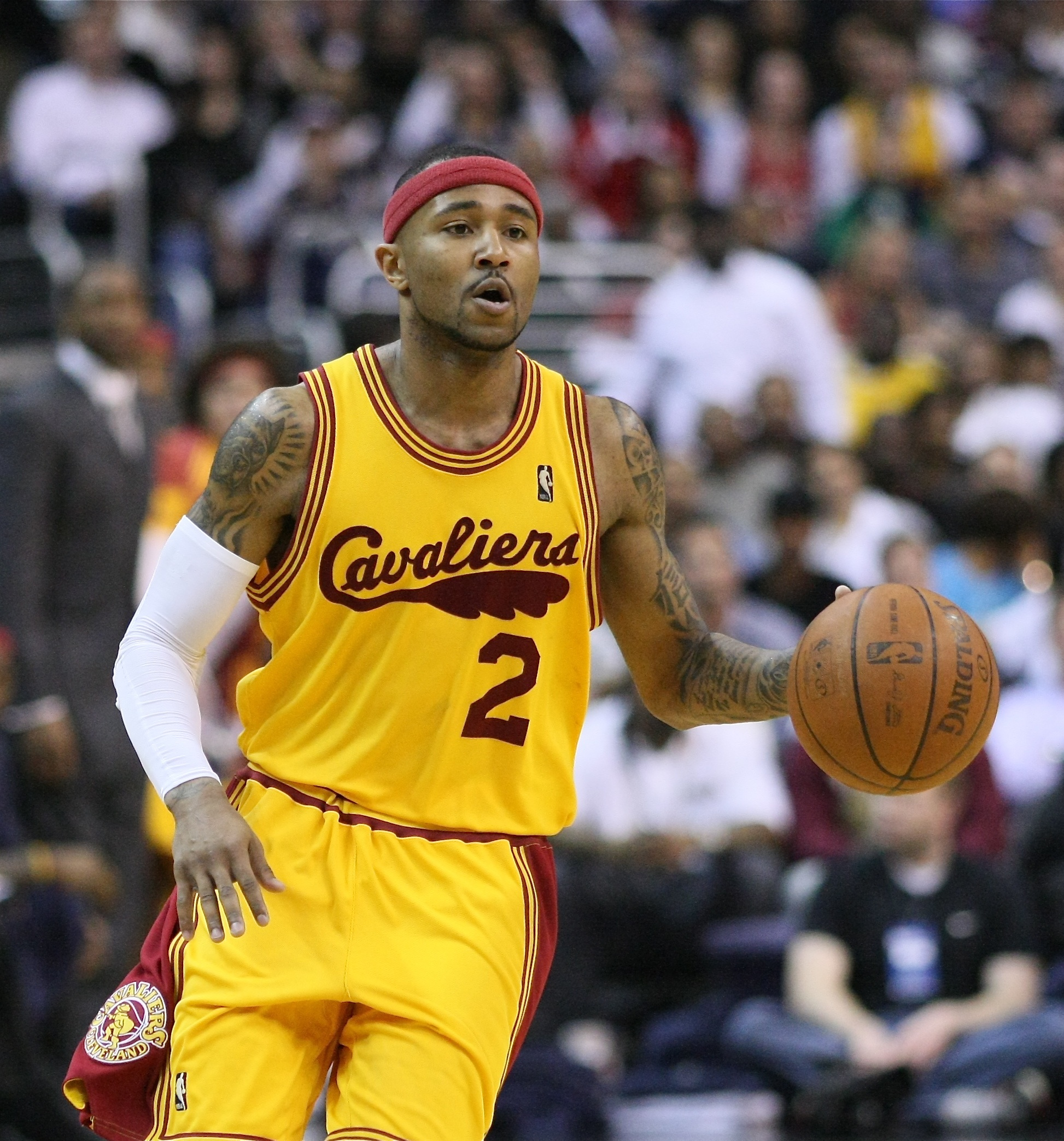
Mo Williams

- Noah Philipps (born 2011), shooting guard (Gulfport)
- Mahmoud Abdul-Rauf (born 1969), point guard (Gulfport)
- Coolidge Ball (1951–2023), forward (Indianola)
- Earl Barron (born 1981), center (Clarksdale)
- Billy Ray Bates (born 1956), shooting guard (Kosciusko)
- Jonathan Bender (born 1981), power forward (Picayune)
- Travarus Bennett (born 1979), minor leagues (Rosedale)
- Ruthie Bolton (born 1967), shooting guard, head coach (Lucedale)
- Melvin Booker (born 1972), point guard (Pascagoula)
- Tom Bowens (born 1940), forward-center (Okolona)
- Alonzo Bradley (born 1953), forward (Utica)
- Rickey Brown (born 1958), forward-center (Madison County)
- Shaq Buchanan (born 1997), basketball player in the Israeli Basketball Premier League
- Cleveland Buckner (1938–2006), forward-center (Yazoo City)
- Deondre Burns (born 1997), basketball player in the Israeli Basketball Premier League
- Jackie Butler (born 1985), center (McComb)
- Isaiah Canaan (born 1991), point guard (Biloxi)
- Maurice Carter (born 1976), guard (Jackson)
- Cornelius Cash (born 1952), forward (Macon)
- Harvey Catchings (born 1951), center (Jackson)
- Terry Catledge (born 1963), forward (Houston)
- Van Chancellor (born 1943), women's coach (Louisville)
- E.C. Coleman (born 1950), forward (Flora)
- Joe Courtney (born 1969), power forward (Jackson)
- Erick Dampier (born 1975), center (New Hebron)
- Ollie Darden (born 1944), forward-center (Aberdeen)
- Archie Dees (1936–2016), forward-center (Ethel)
- Ronald Dupree (born 1981), small forward (Biloxi)
- Keith Edmonson (born 1960), guard (Gulfport)
- Monta Ellis (born 1985), point guard and shooting guard (Jackson)
- Drew Eubanks (born 1997), power forward/center (Starkville)
- Tim Floyd (born 1954), men's head coach (Hattiesburg)
- Nell Fortner (born 1959), women's head coach (Jackson)
- Jennifer Gillom (born 1964), WNBA player, Olympic gold medalist, coach (Abbeville)
- Gerald Glass (born 1967), guard-forward (Greenwood)
- Lancaster Gordon (born 1962), guard-forward (Jackson)
- Litterial Green (born 1970), point guard (Pascagoula)
- Kevin Griffin (born 1975), shooting guard/small forward
- Tang Hamilton (born 1978), forward (Jackson)
- Ira Harge (born 1941), center (Anguilla)
- Othella Harrington (born 1974), power forward (Jackson)
- Lusia Harris (1955–2022), first female player in Hall of Fame (Minter City)
- Antonio Harvey (born 1970), radio broadcaster, player (Pascagoula)
- Spencer Haywood (born 1949), power forward/center (Silver City)
- Ronnie Henderson (born 1974), shooting guard, led the SEC twice in scoring at LSU (Gulfport)
- Jeanne Ruark Hoff, player for Stanford
- Eddie Hughes (born 1960), point guard (Greenville)
- Lindsey Hunter (born 1970), point guard (Utica)
- Leroy Hurd (born 1980), forward (Pascagoula)
- Al Jefferson (born 1985), center/power forward (Monticello)
- Clay Johnson (born 1956), guard (Yazoo City)
- John Johnson (1947–2016), small forward (Carthage)
- Trey Johnson (born 1984), shooting guard (Jackson)
- Carolyn Jones-Young (born 1969), guard, Olympic bronze medalist (Bay Springs)
- Randolph Keys (born 1966), guard-forward (Collins)
- Danny Manning (born 1966), forward (Hattiesburg)
- Ed Manning (1944–2011), forward (Summit)
- Antonio McDyess (born 1974), power forward (Quitman)
- Derrick McKey (born 1966), small forward and power forward (Meridian)
- Leland Mitchell (1941–2013), guard (Kiln)
- Matthew Mitchell (born 1970), women's head coach (Louisville)
- Dyron Nix (born 1967), forward (Meridian)
- Audie Norris (born 1960), center (Jackson)
- Willie Norwood (born 1947), forward (Carrollton)
- Travis Outlaw (born 1984), small forward and power forward (Starkville)
- Murriel Page (born 1975), WNBA player (Louin)
- Marckell Patterson (born 1979), shooting guard (Eupora)
- Kenny Payne (born 1966), small forward (Laurel)
- Armintie Price (born 1985), shooting guard (Myrtle)
- Dolph Pulliam (born 1946), center, sportscaster (West Point)
- Bob Quick (born 1946), guard-forward (Thornton)
- Justin Reed (1982–2017), forward (Jackson)
- James Robinson (born 1970), shooting guard (Jackson)
- LaQuinton Ross (born 1991), player for Hapoel Eilat of Israeli Basketball Premier League
- Eugene Short (1953–2016), small forward (Hattiesburg)
- Purvis Short (born 1957), small forward and shooting guard (Hattiesburg)
- Larry Smith (born 1958), center-forward (Rolling Fork)
- Charles Thomas (born 1986), player for Maccabi Rishon LeZion of Israeli Basketball Premier League
- Sedric Toney (born 1962), guard (Columbus)
- Jarvis Varnado (born 1988), forward-center
- Victoria Vivians (born 1994), shooting guard
- Margaret Wade (1912–1995), player and coach (Cleveland)
- Cornell Warner (born 1948), forward-center (Jackson)
- Eric Washington (born 1974), guard-forward (Pearl)
- Slick Watts (born 1951), guard (Rolling Fork)
- Clarence Weatherspoon (born 1970), power forward (Crawford)
- Dwayne Whitfield (born 1972), power forward (Aberdeen)
- Tamika Whitmore (born 1977), forward (Tupelo)
- Maurice "Mo" Williams (born 1982), point guard (Jackson)
- George Wilson (1942–2023), center (Meridian)

== American football ==
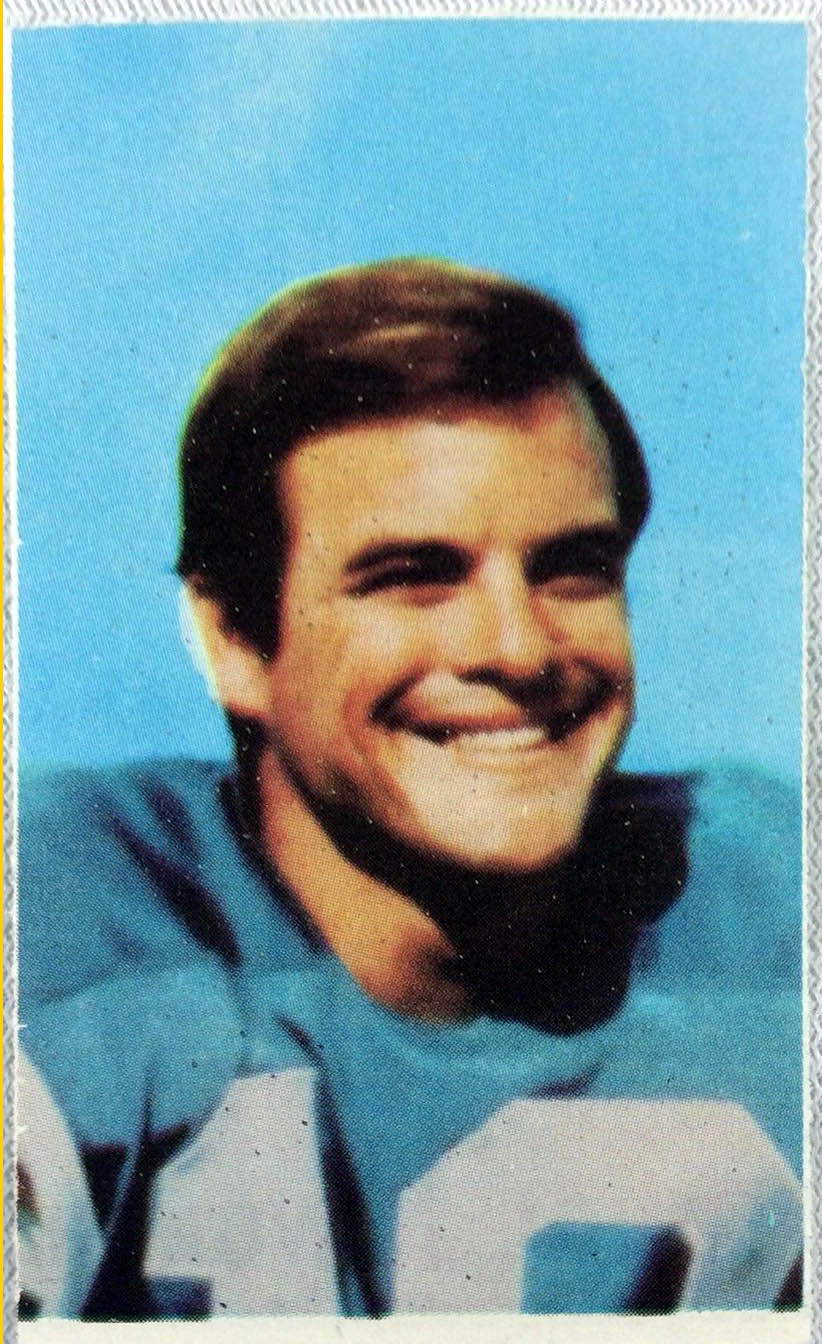
Lance Alworth

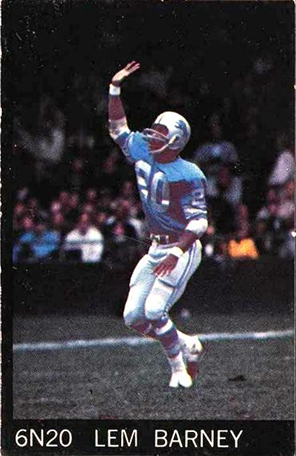
Lem Barney

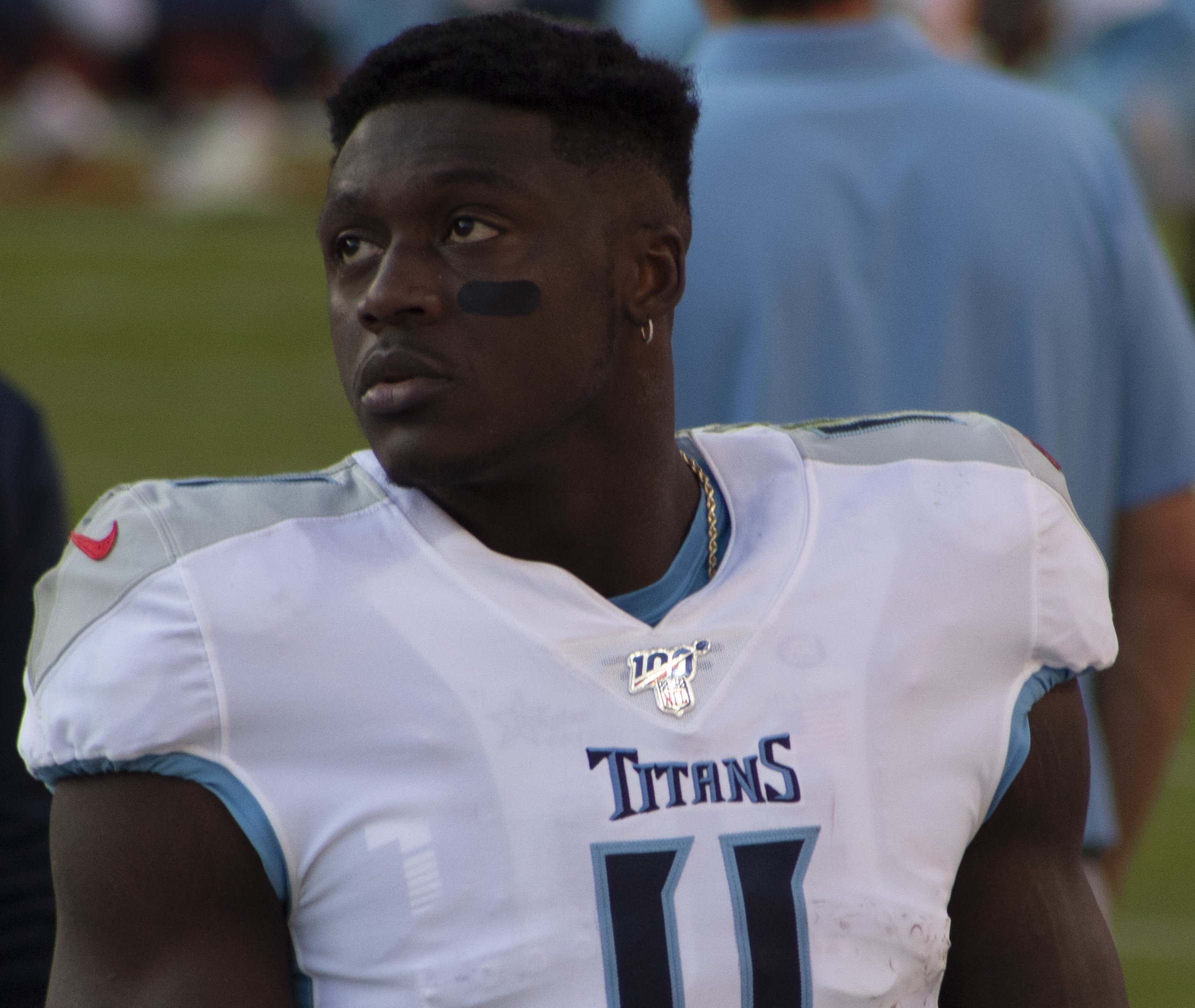
A. J. Brown

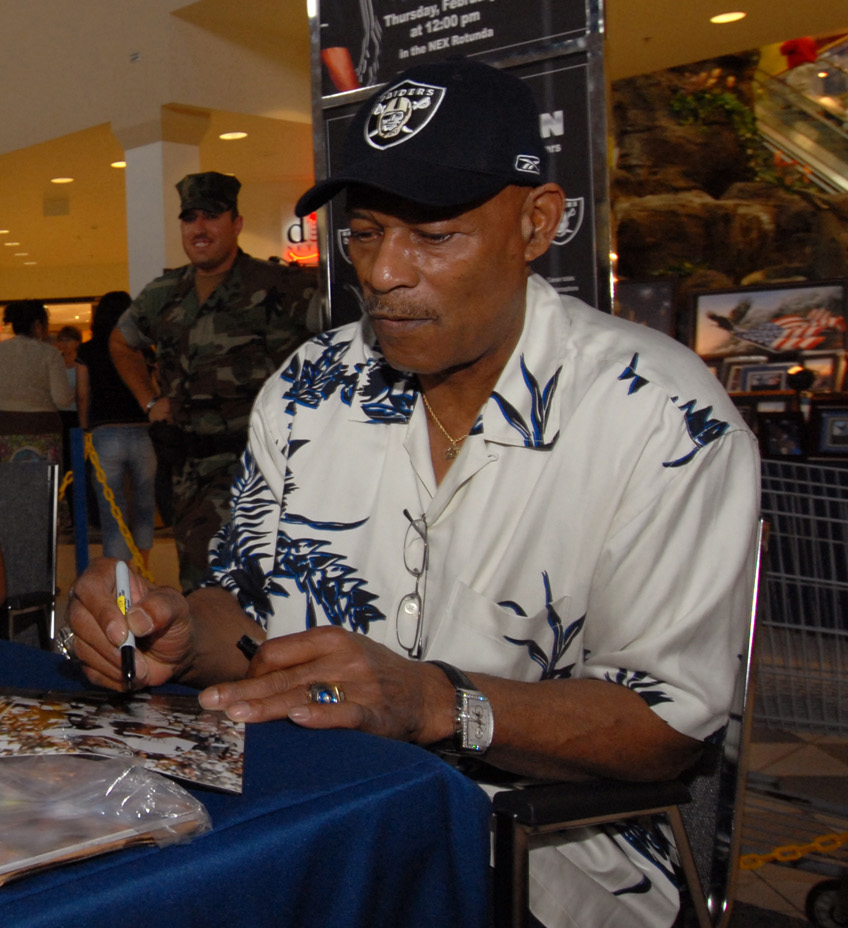
Willie Brown

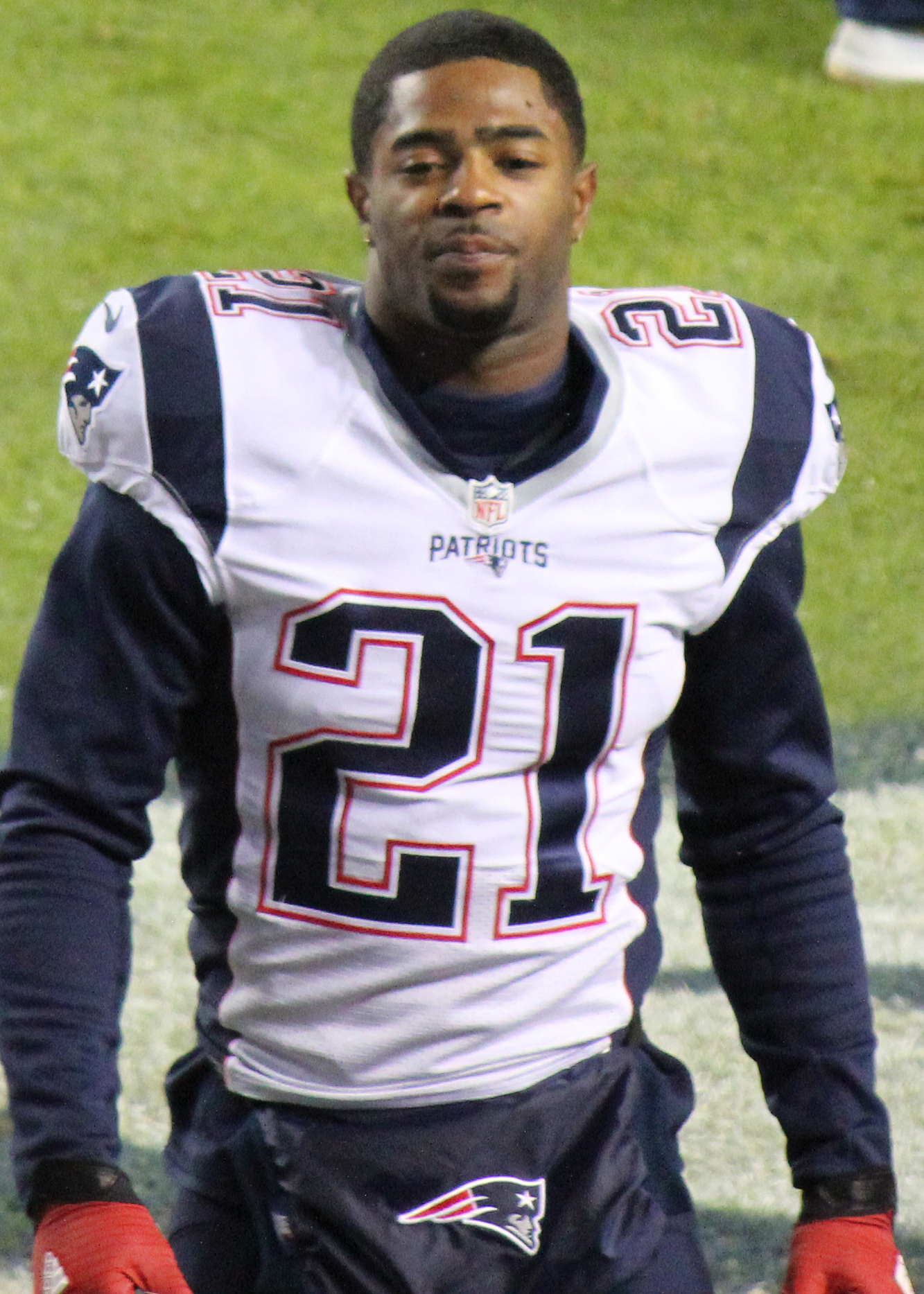
Malcolm Butler

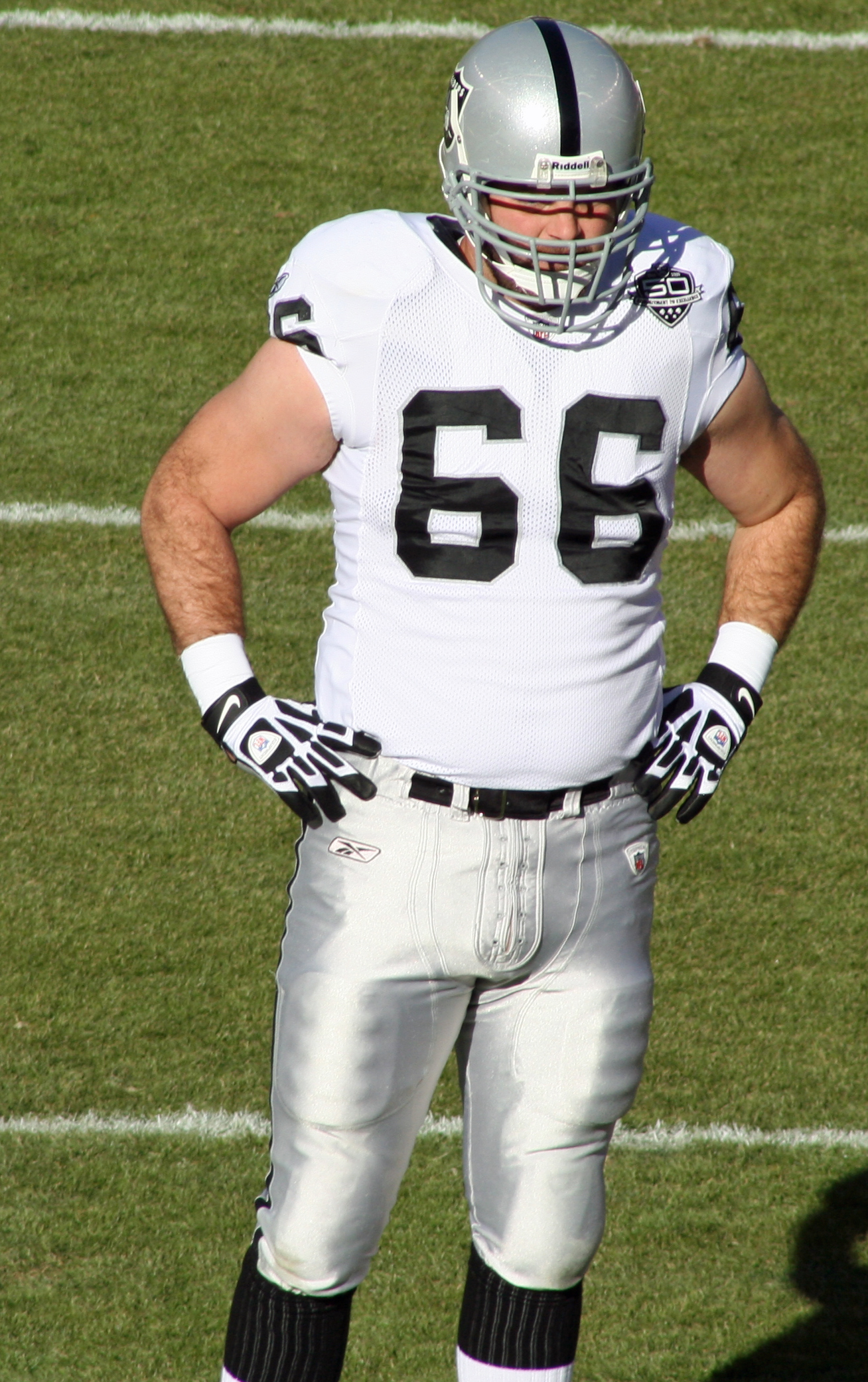
Cooper Carlisle

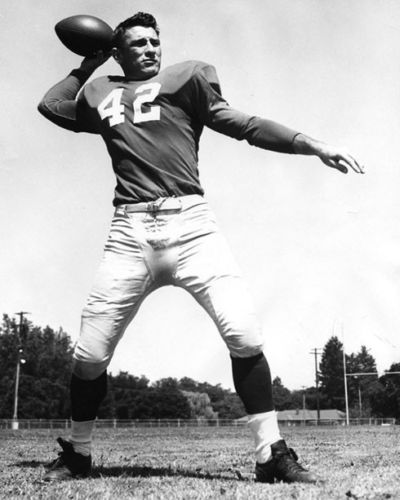
Charlie Conerly

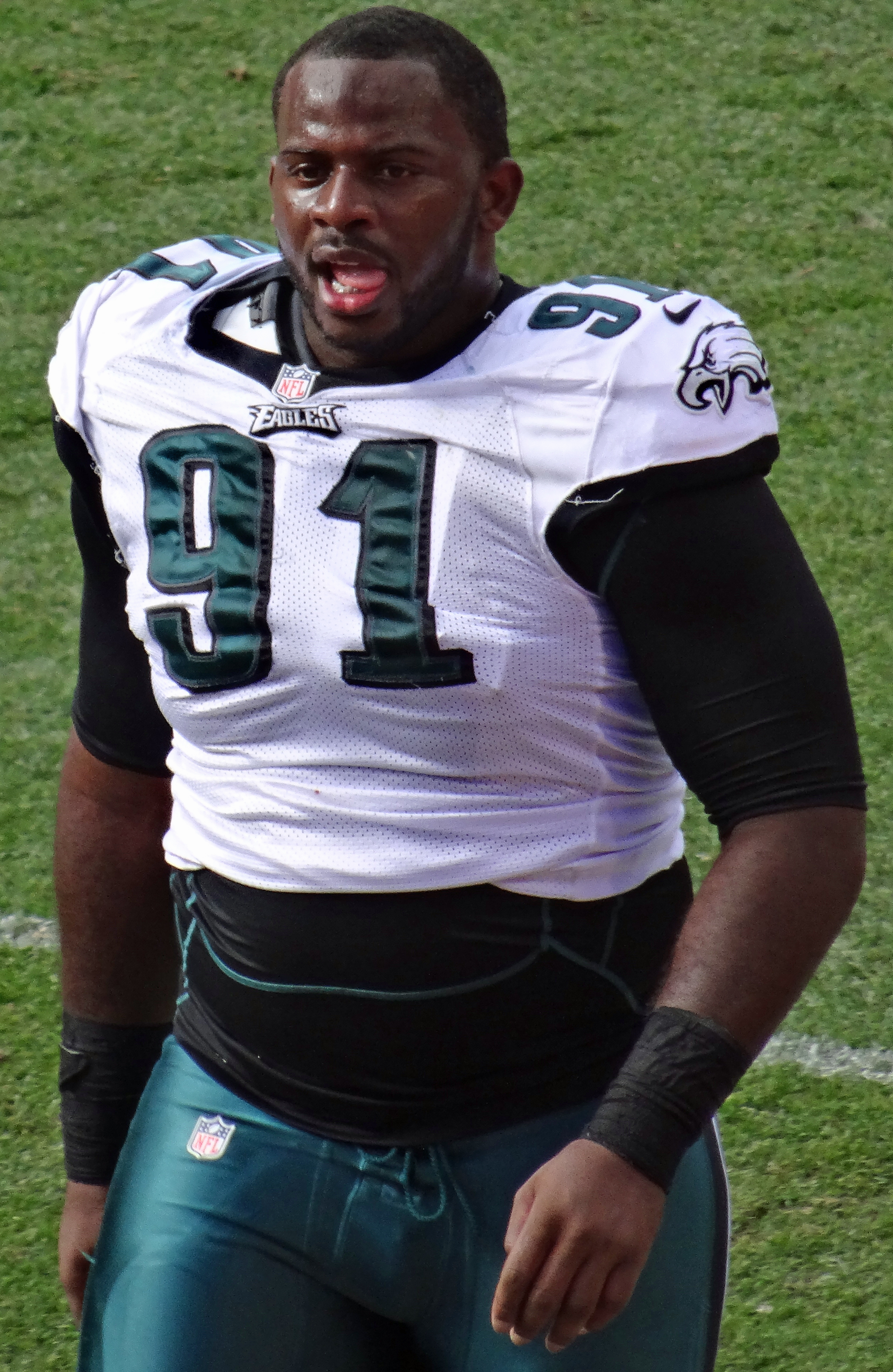
Fletcher Cox

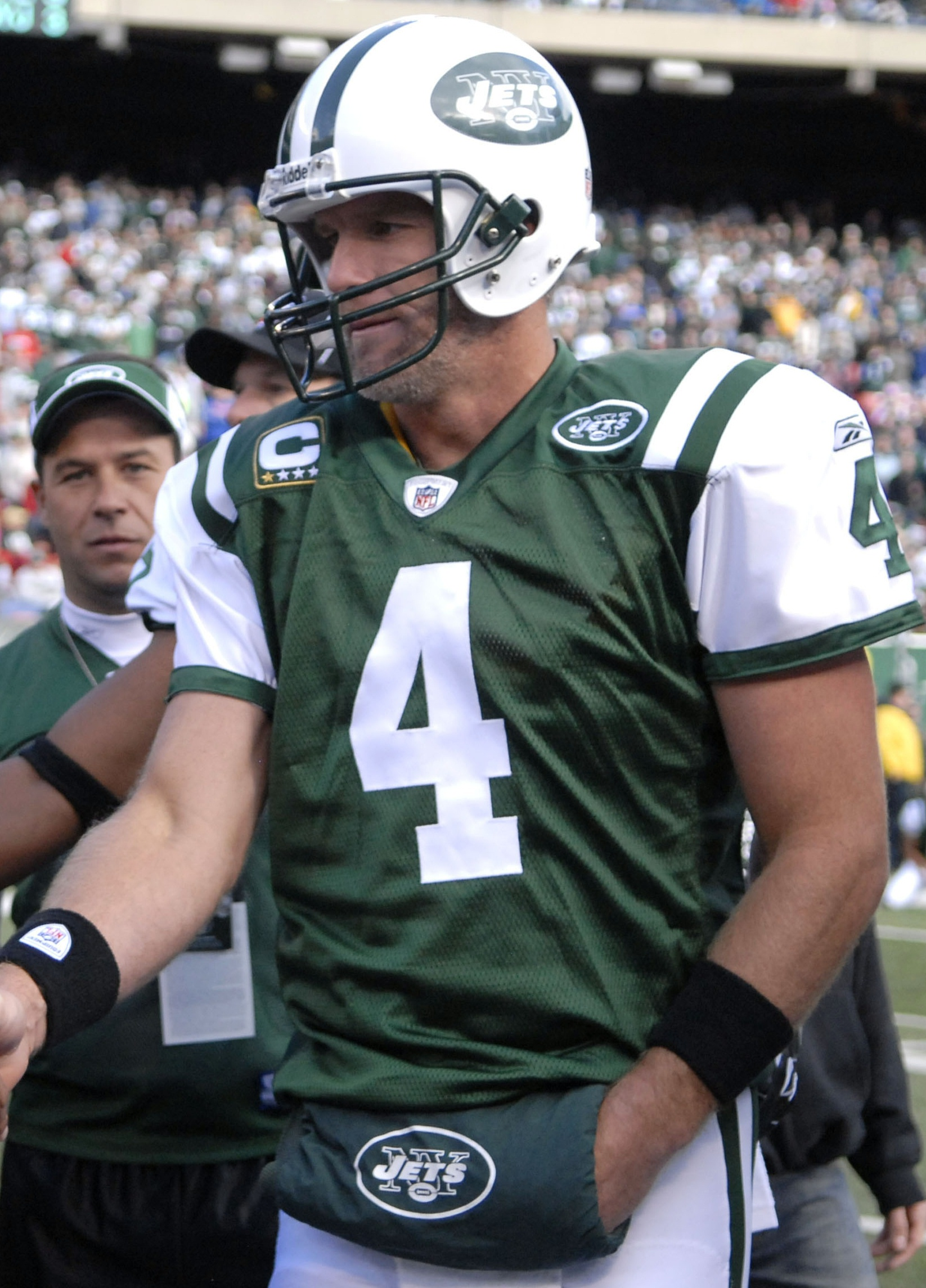
Brett Favre

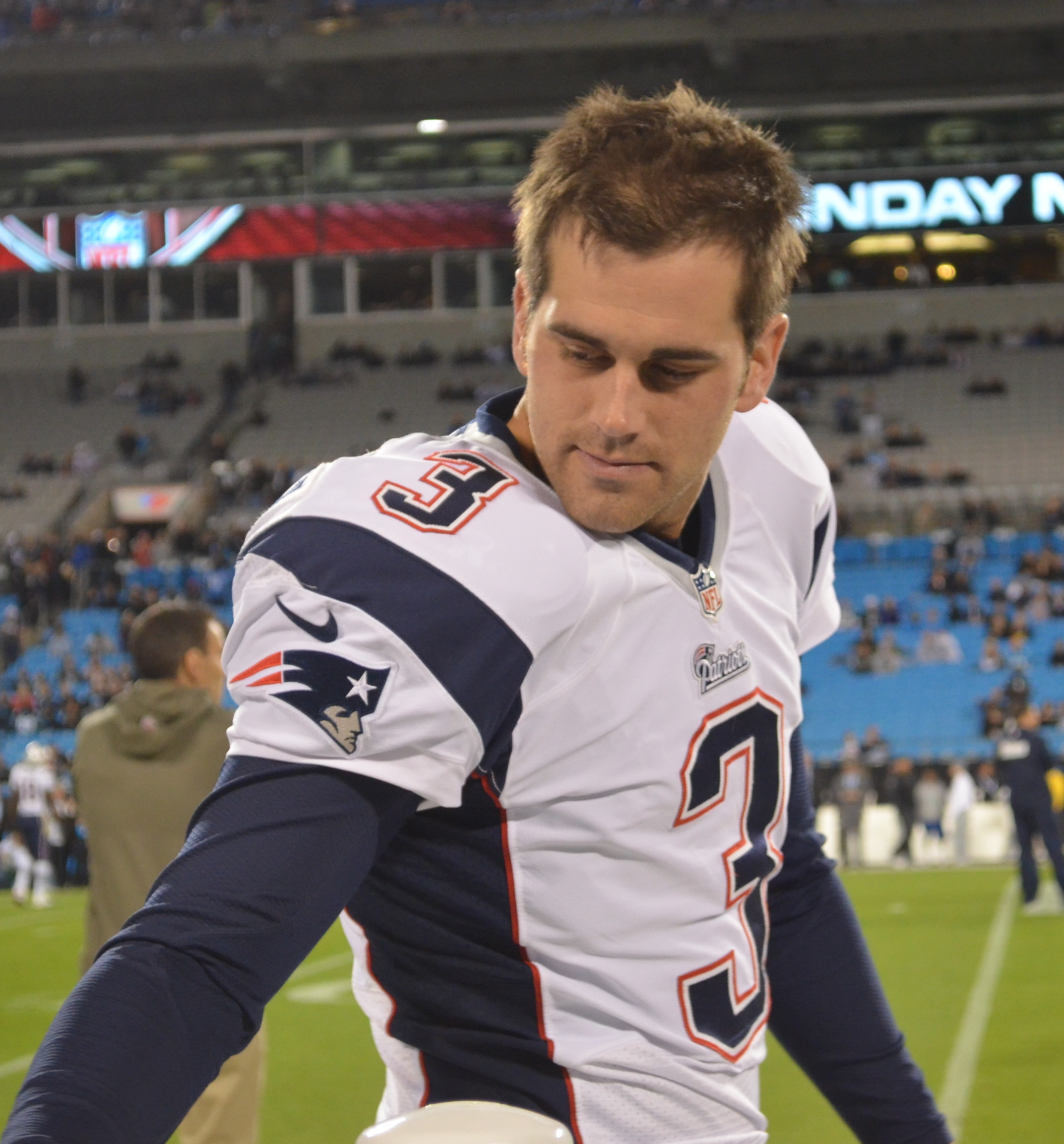
Stephen Gostkowski

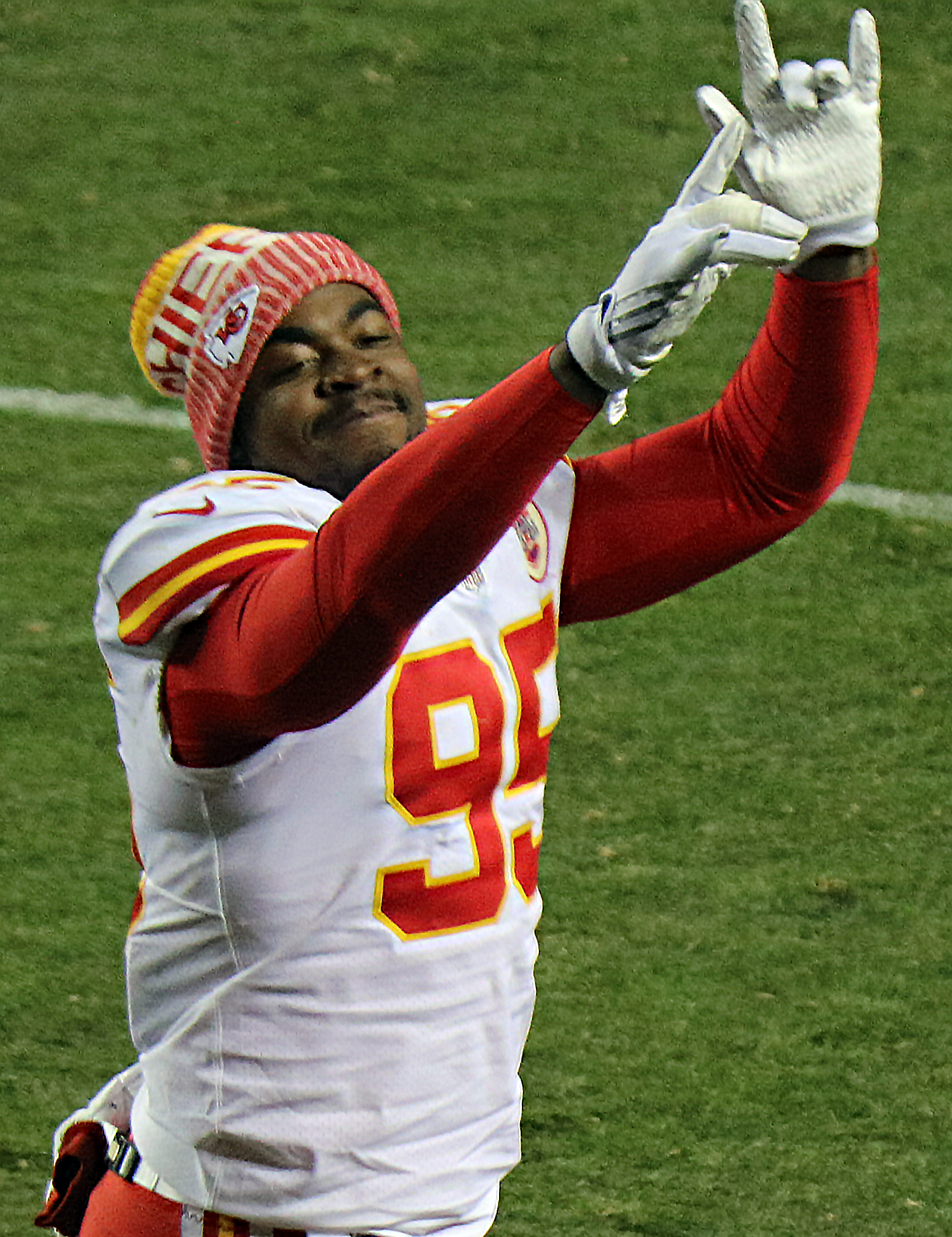
Chris Jones

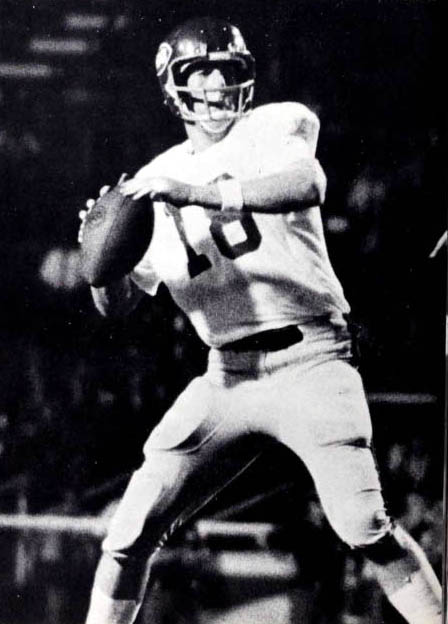
Archie Manning

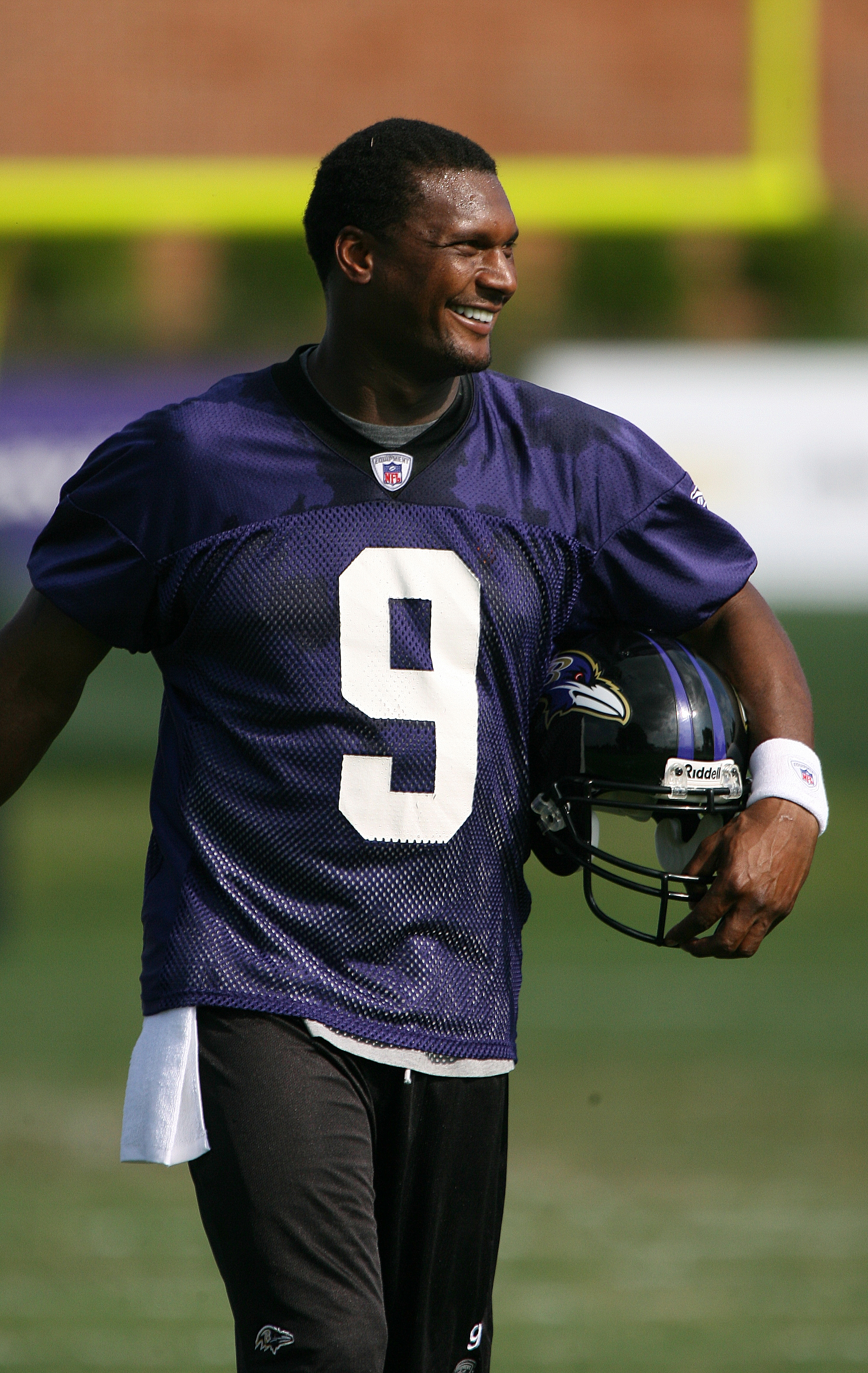
Steve McNair

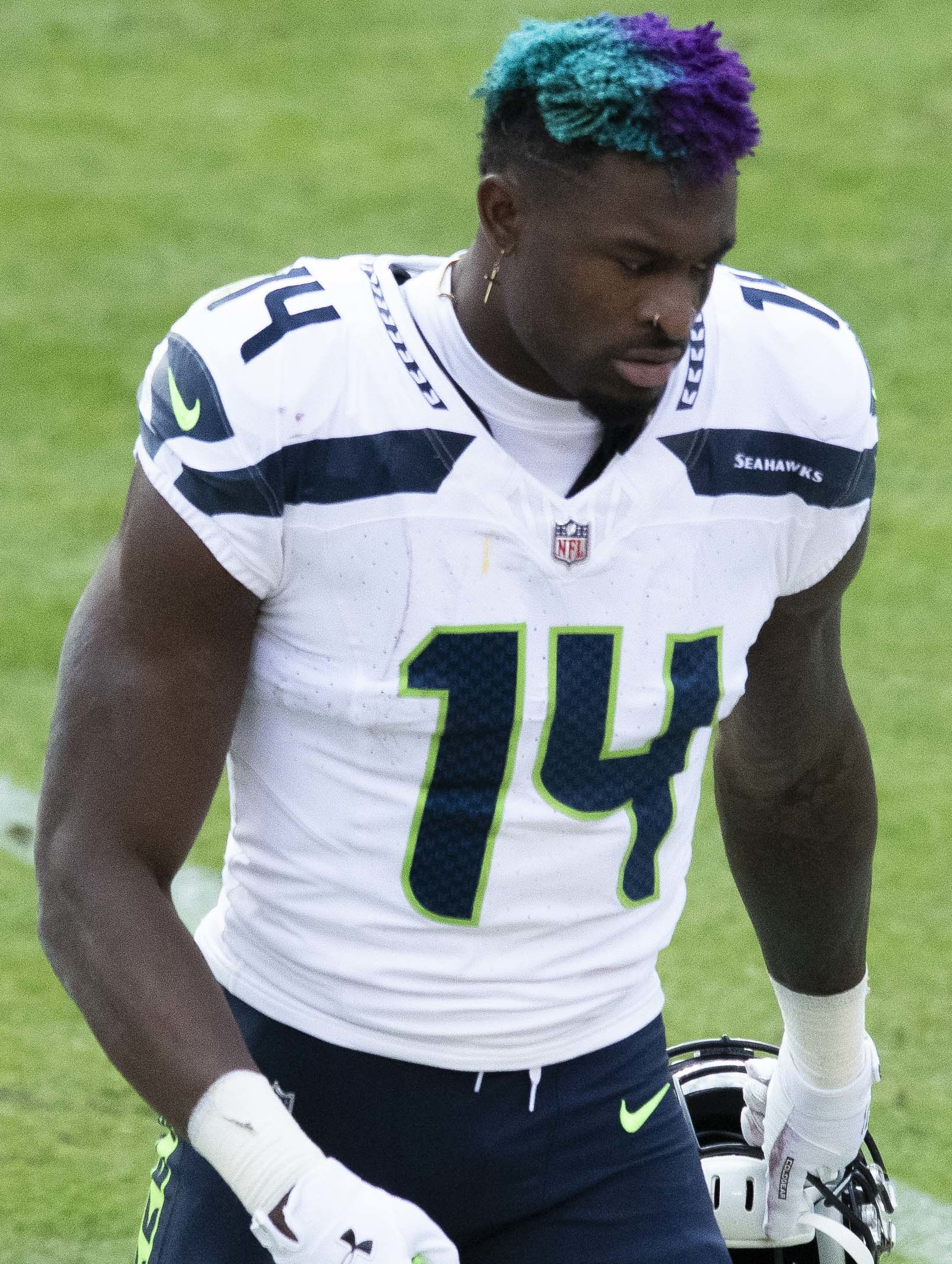
DK Metcalf

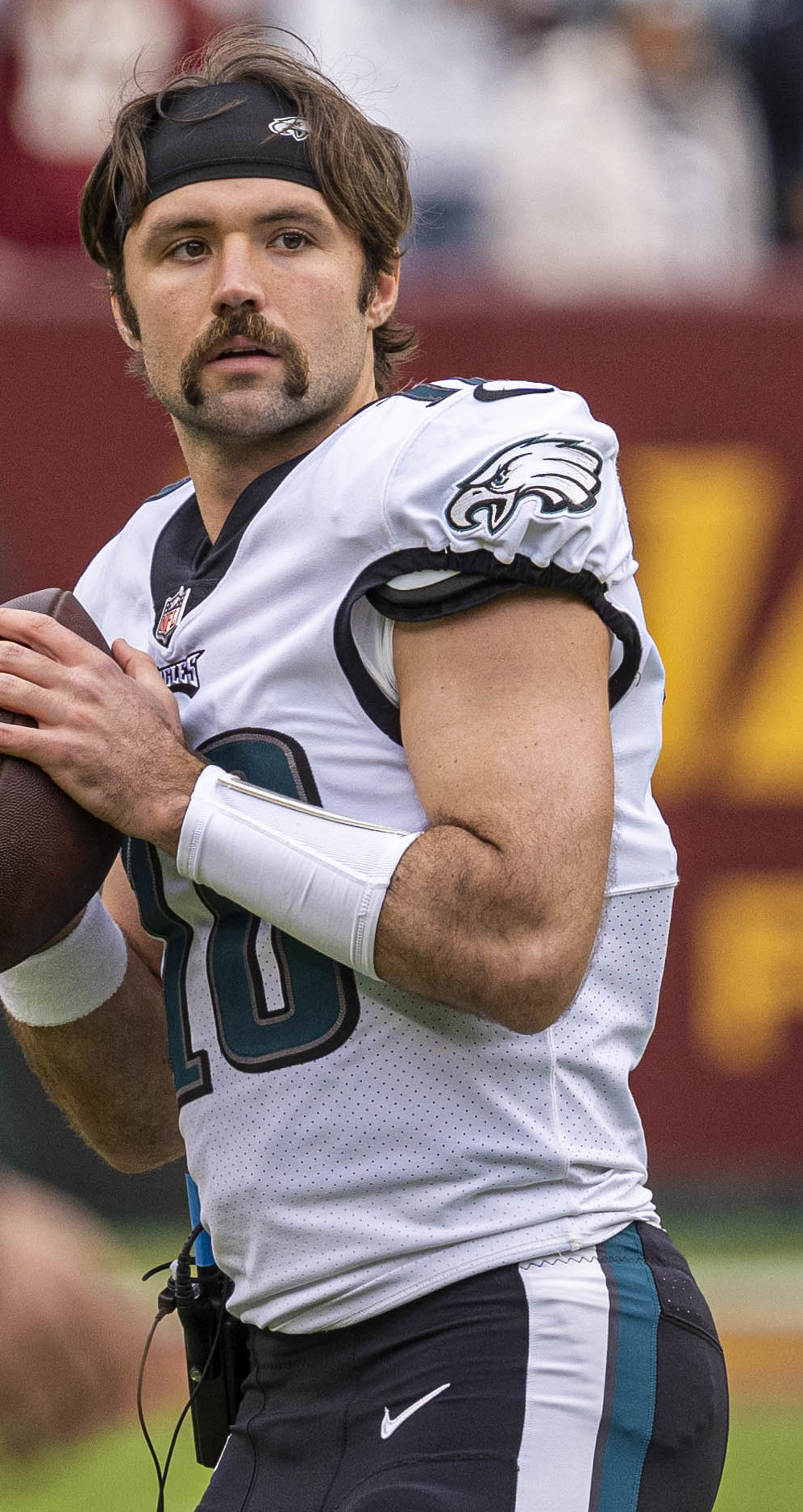
Gardner Minshew

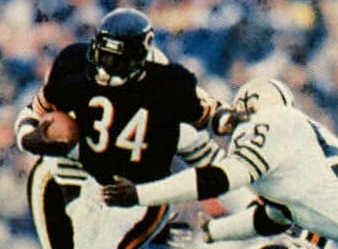
Walter Payton

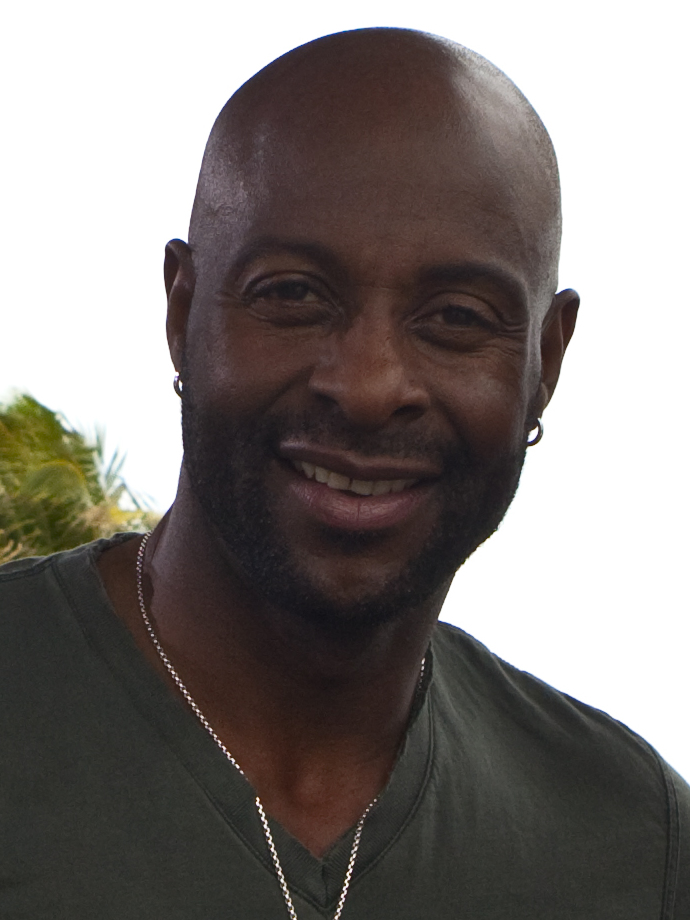
Jerry Rice

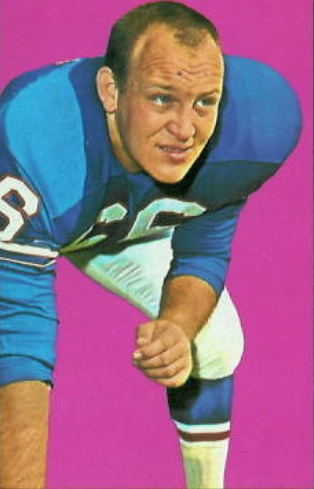
Billy Sha

- Cam Akers (born 1999), running back,(Clinton)
- Brian Alford (born 1975), wide receiver (Crawford)
- Jake Allen (born 1985), wide receiver (Laurel)
- Lance Alworth (born 1940), wide receiver (Brookhaven)
- Jesse Anderson (born 1966), tight end (West Point)
- Rashard Anderson (born 1977), cornerback (Forest)
- Houston Antwine (1939–2011), defensive tackle (Louise)
- Jason Armstead (born 1979), wide receiver for Canadian Football League (Moss Point)
- Hank Autry (1947–2014), center (Hattiesburg)
- Chris Avery (born 1975), fullback and linebacker in arena football (Grenada)
- Vick Ballard (born 1990), running back (Pascagoula)
- Jerome Barkum (born 1950), wide receiver/tight end (Gulfport)
- Fred Barnett (born 1966), wide receiver (Gunnison)
- Lem Barney (born 1945), cornerback (Gulfport)
- Steve Baylark (born 1983), running back (Aberdeen)
- Tony Bennett (born 1967), linebacker (Alligator)
- Kenneth Bernich (born 1951), guard (Biloxi)
- Damarius Bilbo (born 1982), football (Moss Point)
- Earl Blair (1934–2004), halfback (Pascagoula)
- George Blair (born 1938), AFL halfback (Pascagoula)
- Josh Booty (born 1975), quarterback (Starkville)
- Tim Bowens (born 1973), defensive tackle (Okolona)
- Johnny Brewer (1937–2011), tight end/linebacker (Vicksburg)
- Tramaine Brock (born 1988), defensive back (Long Beach)
- A. J. Brown (born 1997), wide receiver (Starkville)
- Allen Brown (1943–2020), tight end (Natchez)
- C. C. Brown (born 1983), safety (Greenwood)
- Nathan Brown (born 1986), quarterback (Hattiesburg)
- Willie Brown (1940–2019), cornerback (Yazoo City)
- Correll Buckhalter (born 1978), running back (Collins)
- Eldra Buckley (born 1985), running back (Charleston)
- Terrell Buckley (born 1971), cornerback (Pascagoula)
- Derrick Burgess (born 1978), defensive end/linebacker (Oxford)
- Chris Burkett (born 1962), wide receiver (Laurel)
- Malcolm Butler (born 1990), cornerback (Vicksburg)
- Jason Campbell (born 1981), quarterback (Laurel)
- Steve Campbell (born 1966), head coach
- Cooper Carlisle (born 1977), offensive guard (Greenville)
- Alex Carrington (born 1987), defensive lineman (Tupelo)
- Chris Carson (born 1994), running back (Biloxi)
- Perry Carter (born 1971), defensive back (McComb)
- Kory Chapman (born 1980), running back (Batesville)
- Don Churchwell (1936–2010), offensive tackle (Leakesville)
- Billy Clay (born 1944), cornerback (Oxford)
- Roderick (Rod) Coleman (born 1976), defensive tackle (Vicksburg)
- Reggie Collier (born 1961), quarterback and wide receiver (D'Iberville)
- Jalen Collins (born 1993), cornerback (Southaven)
- Jamie Collins (born 1989), linebacker (McCall Creek)
- Charlie Conerly (1921–1996), quarterback (Clarksdale)
- Darion Conner (born 1967), NFL linebacker and Arena Football League player, convicted of vehicular homicide (Macon)
- Fred Cook (born 1952), defensive end (Pascagoula)
- Logan Cooke (born 1995), NFL punter (Columbia)
- Johnie Cooks (1958–2023), linebacker (Leland)
- Russell Copeland (born 1971), wide receiver (Tupelo)
- Fletcher Cox (born 1990), defensive tackle (Yazoo City)
- Bobby Crespino (1938–2013), tight end (Duncan)
- Quinton Culberson (born 1985), linebacker (Jackson)
- Doug Cunningham (1945–2015), running back (Louisville)
- Roland Dale (1927–2012), end (Magee)
- Willie Daniel (1937–2015), defensive back (New Albany)
- Demario Davis (born 1989), linebacker (Brandon)
- Rod Davis (born 1981), linebacker (Gulfport)
- Mike Dennis (born 1944), running back (Philadelphia)
- Anthony Dixon (born 1987), running back (Jackson)
- Kevin Dockery (born 1984), cornerback (Hernando)
- Larry Dorsey (born 1953), wide receiver and high school coach (Corinth)
- Jim Dunaway (1941–2018), defensive tackle (Columbia)
- Marcus Dupree (born 1964), running back (Philadelphia)
- Antuan Edwards (born 1977), safety (Starkville)
- Mario Edwards (born 1975), cornerback (Gautier)
- Carlos Emmons (born 1973), linebacker (Greenwood)
- Mike Espy (born 1982), wide receiver (Jackson)
- Kaleb Eulls (born 1991), defensive tackle (Yazoo County)
- Major Everett (born 1960), running back (New Hebron)
- Brett Favre (born 1969), quarterback (Kiln)
- Jason Ferguson (born 1974), defensive tackle (Nettleton)
- Damion Fletcher (born 1987), running back (Biloxi)
- Leslie Frazier (born 1959), cornerback and safety/defensive coordinator (Columbus)
- Steve Freeman (born 1953), defensive back, game official (Oxford)
- C. J. Gaddis (born 1985), safety (Hattiesburg)
- William Gaines (born 1971), defensive lineman (Jackson)
- Jimmie Giles (born 1954), tight end (Natchez)
- Robert Gillespie (born 1979), running back (Hattiesburg)
- Chris Givens (born 1989), wide receiver (Jackson)
- Tom Goode (1938–2015), offensive lineman (West Point)
- Stephen Gostkowski (born 1984), placekicker (Madison)
- Larry Grantham (1938–2017), linebacker (Crystal Springs)
- Hugh Green (born 1959), linebacker (Natchez)
- Louis Green (born 1979), linebacker (Vicksburg)
- L. C. Greenwood (1946–2013), defensive end (Canton)
- Jack Gregory (1944–2019), defensive end (Okolona)
- Cedric Griffin (born 1982), cornerback (Natchez)
- Glynn Griffing (born 1940), quarterback (Bentonia)
- Justin Griffith (born 1980), fullback (Magee)
- Quentin Groves (born 1984), defensive end (Greenville)
- Michael Haddix (born 1961), running back (Tippah County)
- Bobby Hamilton (born 1971), defensive end (Columbia)
- Parys Haralson (born 1984), linebacker (Flora)
- Larry Hardy (born 1956), tight end (Mendenhall)
- Clarence Harmon (born 1955), running back (Kosciusko)
- Anthony Harris (born 1981), defensive tackle (Mayersville)
- Larry Hart (born 1987), defensive end and outside linebacker (Madison)
- Kevin Henry (born 1968), defensive lineman (Mound Bayou)
- Mack Herron (1948–2015), running back (Biloxi)
- Tyreek Hill (born 1994), wide receiver (Biloxi)
- Roy Hilton (1943–2019), defensive end (Hazlehurst)
- Stephen Hobbs (born 1965), wide receiver (Mendenhall)
- Walter Holman (born 1959), running back (Vaiden)
- Corey Holmes (born 1976), running back in Canadian football (Greenville)
- Jaret Holmes (born 1976), placekicker (Clinton)
- Lester Holmes (born 1969), offensive lineman (Tylertown)
- Estus Hood (born 1955), cornerback (Hattiesburg)
- Houston Hoover (born 1965), offensive lineman (Yazoo City)
- Joe Horn (born 1972), wide receiver (Tupelo)
- Derrick Hoskins (born 1970), cornerback (Meridian)
- Gary Huff (born 1951), quarterback (Natchez)
- Kent Hull (born 1960), offensive lineman (Pontotoc)
- Don Hultz (born 1940), defensive lineman (Moss Point)
- Terry Irvin (born 1954), defensive back for Canadian Football League (Columbia)
- Brandon Jackson (born 1985), running back (Horn Lake)
- Harold Jackson (born 1946), wide receiver (Hattiesburg)
- Jarious Jackson (born 1977), quarterback/free safety for American and Canadian Football Leagues (Tupelo)
- Kirby Jackson (born 1965), defensive back (Sturgis)
- Tristan Jackson (born 1986), defensive back in Canadian football (Beaumont)
- Sean James (born 1969), running back (Meridian)
- Melvin Jenkins (born 1962), cornerback (Jackson)
- M. D. Jennings (born 1988), strong safety (Grenada)
- John Jerry (born 1986), offensive lineman (Batesville)
- Peria Jerry (born 1984), defensive tackle (Batesville)
- Antonio Johnson (born 1984), defensive tackle (Leland)
- Dennis Johnson (born 1956), fullback (Weir)
- Rory Johnson (born 1986), linebacker for American and Canadian Football Leagues (Vicksburg)
- Spencer Johnson (born 1981), defensive end (Waynesboro)
- Tom Johnson (born 1984), defensive tackle (Moss Point)
- Chris Jones (born 1982), wide receiver (Macon)
- Chris Jones (born 1994), defensive tackle (Houston)
- Ronald Jones (born 1981), defensive lineman for Canadian Football League (Gulfport)
- Reggie Kelly (born 1977), tight end (Aberdeen)
- Tommy Kelly (born 1980), defensive tackle (Jackson)
- Tyrone Keys (born 1960), defensive lineman (Jackson)
- Ed Khayat (born 1935), defensive end (Moss Point)
- Frank Kinard (1914–1985), offensive tackle (Pelahatchie)
- Curt Knight (born 1943), placekicker (Gulfport)
- Paul Lacoste (born 1974), linebacker (Jackson)
- Roland Lakes (1939–2012), defensive lineman/defensive tackle (Vicksburg)
- Maxie Lambright (1924–1980), player at Southern Mississippi; coach at Louisiana Tech (McComb)
- Cameron Lawrence (born 1991), linebacker (Coldwater)
- Donald Lee (born 1980), tight end (Maben)
- Brad Leggett (born 1966), center (Vicksburg)
- Alex Lincoln (born 1977), linebacker (Meridian)
- Ken Lucas (born 1979), cornerback (Cleveland)
- Milton Mack (born 1963), cornerback (Jackson)
- Earsell Mackbee (1941–2009), cornerback (Brookhaven)
- John Mangum (born 1967), defensive back (Magee)
- Kris Mangum (born 1973), tight end (Magee)
- Archie Manning (born 1949), quarterback (Drew)
- Eli Manning (born 1981), quarterback (Oxford)
- Aubrey Matthews (born 1962), wide receiver (Pascagoula)
- Shane Matthews (born 1970), quarterback (Pascagoula)
- Fred McAfee (born 1968), running back (Philadelphia)
- Deuce McAllister (born 1978), running back (Morton)
- Trumaine McBride (born 1985), cornerback (Clarksdale)
- Dee McCann (born 1983), cornerback for American and Canadian Football Leagues (Lucedale)
- Dexter McCleon (born 1973), safety (Meridian)
- Sam McCullum (born 1952), wide receiver (McComb)
- Ben McGee (born 1939), defensive end (Starkville)
- Buford McGee (born 1960), running back (Durant)
- Herb McMath (1954–2016), defensive tackle and defensive end (Coahoma)
- Greg McMurtry (born 1967), wide receiver (Jackson)
- Fred McNair (born 1968), quarterback (Mount Olive)
- Steve McNair (1973–2009), quarterback (Mount Olive)
- Freeman McNeil (born 1959), running back (Jackson)
- Jerrold McRae (born 1955), wide receiver (Laurel)
- Quinton Meaders (born 1983), defensive back for Canadian Football League (Tupelo)
- DK Metcalf (born 1997), wide receiver (Oxford)
- Jim Miller (born 1957), punter (Ripley)
- Romaro Miller (born 1978), quarterback (Shannon)
- Freddie Milons (born 1980), wide receiver (Starkville)
- Gardner Minshew (born 1996), quarterback (Brandon)
- Jayme Mitchell (born 1984), defensive end (Jackson)
- Frank Molden (1942–2023), defensive tackle (Moss Point)
- Cleo Montgomery (born 1956), wide receiver (Greenville)
- Wilbert Montgomery (born 1954), running back (Greenville)
- Stevon Moore (born 1967), safety (Wiggins)
- Melvin Morgan (born 1953), defensive back (Gulfport)
- Eric Moulds (born 1973), wide receiver (Lucedale)
- Michael Myers (born 1976), defensive tackle (Vicksburg)
- John Nix (born 1976), defensive lineman in arena football (Lucedale)
- Jerious Norwood (born 1983), running back (Jackson)
- Kevin Norwood (born 1989), wide receiver (Biloxi)
- Freddie Joe Nunn (born 1962), defensive end/linebacker (Noxubee County)
- Michael Oher (born 1986), offensive tackle (Oxford)
- Will Overstreet (born 1979), linebacker (Jackson)
- Joe Owens (1946–2013), defensive end (Columbia)
- Eddie Payton (born 1951), running back (Columbia)
- Walter Payton (1954–1999), half back (Columbia)
- Derek Pegues (born 1986), safety (Batesville)
- Marlo Perry (born 1972), linebacker (Forest)
- Vernon Perry (born 1953), cornerback (Jackson)
- Stephen Peterman (born 1982), offensive guard (Gulfport)
- Danny Pierce (born 1948), running back (Laurel)
- Lawrence Pillers (born 1952), defensive end (Hazelhurst)
- Todd Pinkston (born 1977), wide receiver (Forest)
- Clinton Portis (born 1981), running back (Laurel)
- Jeff Posey (born 1975), linebacker (Bassfield)
- Clyde Powers (born 1951), safety (Pascagoula)
- Glover Quin (born 1986), cornerback (McComb)
- Eddie Ray (born 1947), running back (Vicksburg)
- Oscar Reed (born 1944), running back (Jonestown)
- Johnny Rembert (born 1961), linebacker (Hollandale)
- Will Renfro (1932–2010), offensive tackle (Batesville)
- Jerry Rice (born 1962), wide receiver (Starkville)
- Bobby Richards (born 1938), defensive lineman (Columbus)
- Gloster Richardson (1942–2020), wide receiver (Greenville)
- Willie Richardson (1939–2016), wide receiver (Clarksdale)
- Stevan Ridley (born 1989), running back (Natchez)
- Dwayne Rudd (born 1976), linebacker (Batesville)
- Tyrone Rush (born 1971), running back (Meridian)
- Jamarca Sanford (born 1985), safety (Batesville)
- John Sawyer (born 1953), tight end (Brookhaven)
- Cedric Scott (born 1977), defensive tackle for Canadian Football League (Gulfport)
- Billy Shaw (born 1938), offensive guard (Natchez)
- Harold Shaw (born 1974), fullback and occasional linebacker (Magee)
- Derek Sherrod (born 1989), offensive tackle (Caledonia)
- Billy Shields (born 1954), tackle (Vicksburg)
- Kendall Simmons (born 1979), guard (Ripley)
- Terrance Simmons (born 1976), defensive tackle (Moss Point)
- Eugene Sims (born 1986), defensive end (Mize)
- Jackie Slater (born 1954), offensive tackle (Jackson)
- Aldon Smith (born 1989), outside linebacker (Greenwood)
- Jackie Smith (born 1940), tight end (Columbia)
- Jimmy Smith (born 1969), wide receiver (Jackson)
- Noland Smith (born 1943), wide receiver/return specialist (Jackson)
- Bradley Sowell (born 1989), offensive tackle (Hernando)
- Armegis Spearman (born 1978), linebacker (Oxford)
- Chris Spencer (born 1982), center (Madison)
- Irving Spikes (born 1970), running back (Ocean Springs)
- Billy Stacy (1936–2019), safety (Drew)
- Thomas Strauthers (born 1961), defensive lineman (Wesson)
- Diron Talbert (born 1944), defensive tackle (Pascagoula)
- Don Talbert (born 1939), offensive tackle (Louisville)
- Malcolm Taylor (born 1960), defensive end (Crystal Springs)
- Daryl Terrell (born 1975), offensive lineman (Vossburg)
- Fred Thomas (born 1973), cornerback (Bruce)
- Norris Thomas (born 1954), cornerback (Inverness)
- Sarah Thomas (born 1973), NFL official (Pascagoula)
- Eric Tillman (born c. 1957), general manager of the Canadian Football League (Jackson)
- Lewis Tillman (born 1966), running back (Hazlehurst)
- Billy Tohill (1939–2000), head coach (Batesville)
- Willie Totten (born 1962), head coach (Leflore County)
- Deshea Townsend (born 1975), cornerback (Batesville)
- Bill Triplett (born 1940), running back (Shaw)
- Billy Truax (born 1943), tight end (Gulfport)
- Jim Urbanek (1945–2009), defensive tackle (Oxford)
- Gerald Vaughn (born 1970), defensive back for Canadian Football League (Abbeville)
- Jim Walden (born c. 1938), head coach (Aberdeen)
- Kenyatta Walker (born 1979), offensive tackle (Meridian)
- Gavin Walls (born 1980), defensive end for Canadian Football League (Ripley)
- Wesley Walls (born 1966), tight end (Batesville)
- Tom Walters (born 1942), safety (Petal)
- Chris Washington (born 1962), linebacker (Jackson)
- Swayze Waters (born 1987), kicker (Jackson)
- Kendell Watkins (born 1973), tight end (Jackson)
- Willie West (born 1938), defensive back (Lexington)
- Chris White (born 1983), guard (Winona)
- Larry Whigham (born 1972), cornerback (Hattiesburg)
- Ben Williams (1954–2020), defensive lineman (Yazoo City)
- Grant Williams (born 1974), offensive tackle (Hattiesburg)
- Greg Williams (born 1959), safety (Greenville)
- John Williams (1945–2012), offensive lineman (Jackson)
- Sammy Williams (born 1974), offensive tackle (Magnolia)
- Odell Willis (born 1984), defensive lineman for American and Canadian Football Leagues (Meridian)
- Damien Wilson (born 1993), linebacker (Gloster)
- Sammy Winder (born 1959), running back (Madison)
- Mike Withycombe (born 1964), guard (Meridian)
- Otis Wonsley (born 1957), running back (Pascagoula)
- Lee Woodruff (1909–1947), running back (Batesville)
- Keith Woodside (born 1964), running back (Natchez)
- Abe Woodson (1934–2014), cornerback/kick returner (Jackson)
- Marv Woodson (born 1941), defensive back (Hattiesburg)
- Floyd Womack (born 1978), offensive tackle (Cleveland)
- Cornelius Wortham (born 1982), linebacker (Calhoun City)
- K. J. Wright (born 1989), linebacker (Olive Branch)
- Ellis Wyms (born 1979), defensive lineman (Indianola)

== Gymnastics ==
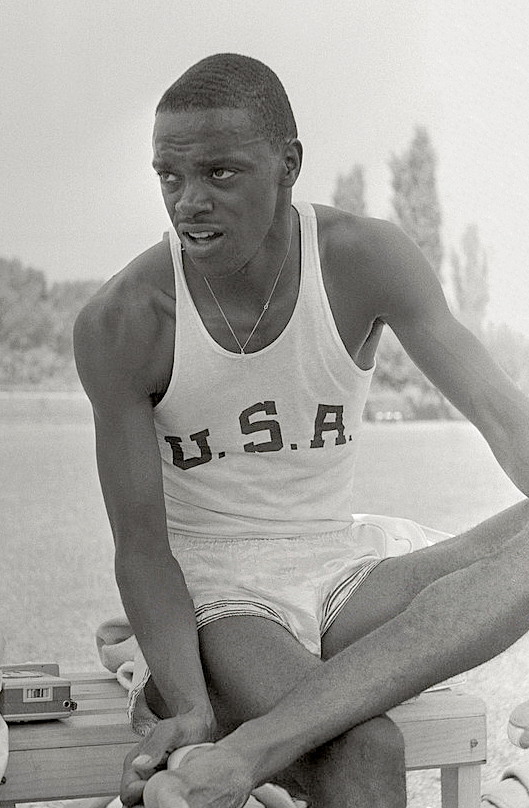
Ralph Boston

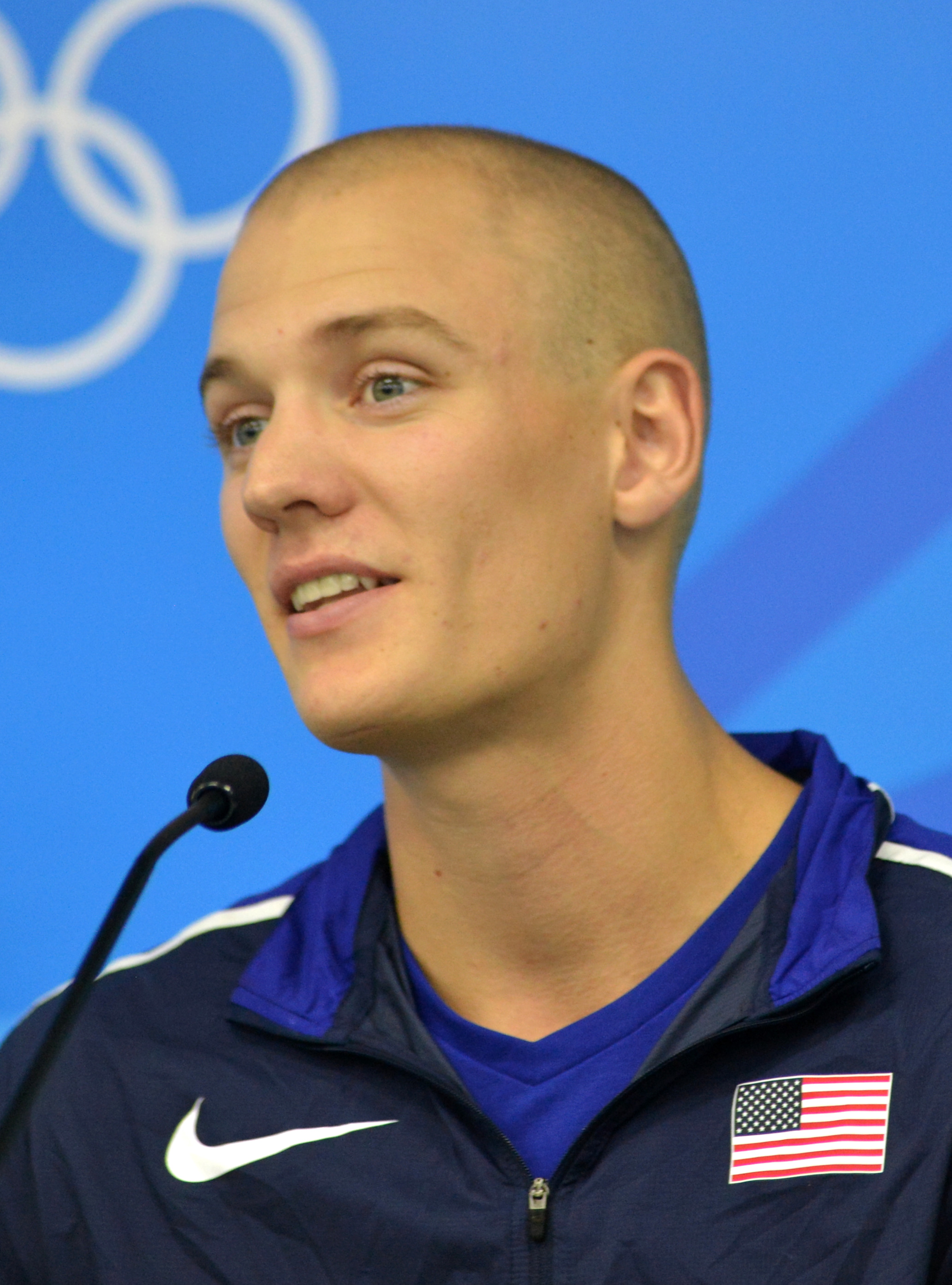
Sam Kendricks

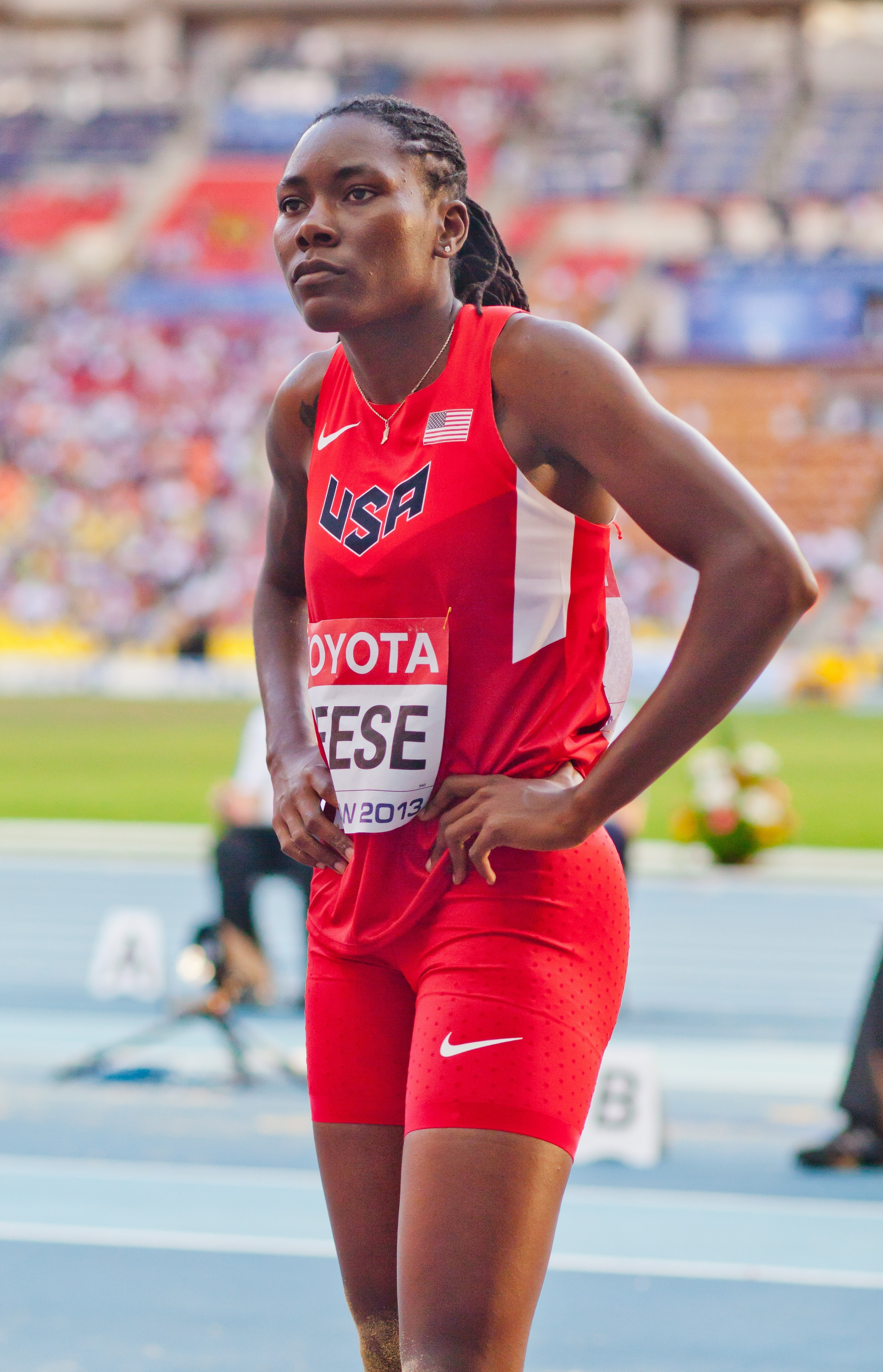
Brittney Reese

- Fletcher Abram (born 1950), Olympic handball player (Cary)
- Henry Armstrong (1912–1988), professional boxer (Columbus)
- Lisa Aukland (born 1958), professional bodybuilder and powerlifter
- Earl W. Bascom (1906–1995), rodeo (Columbia)
- Ralph Boston (1939–2023), Olympic long jumper (Laurel)
- Maggie Bowen (born 1980), swimming (Jackson)
- Tori Bowie (born 1990), Olympic and world champion sprinter (Sand Hill)
- Devin Britton (born 1991), tennis player (Jackson)
- Lee Calhoun (1933–1989), Olympic track athlete and college track coach (Laurel)
- Shelby Cannon (born 1966), professional tennis player (Hattiesburg)
- Commodore Cochran (1902–1969), Olympic track athlete
- Roy Cochran (1919–1981), Olympic track athlete (Richton)
- Floyd Cummings (born 1949), heavyweight boxer
- Tony Dees (born 1963), Olympic hurdler (Pascagoula)
- Craig Demmin (born 1971), soccer defender
- Brett DiBiase (born 1988), professional wrestler (Clinton)
- Ted DiBiase (born 1954), professional wrestler (Clinton)
- Ted DiBiase Jr. (born 1982), professional wrestler (Clinton)
- Barbara Ferrell (born 1947), Olympic track athlete (Hattiesburg)
- Jim Gallagher Jr. (born 1961), professional golfer (Greenwood)
- Bobby Hamilton (1957–2007), NASCAR driver (Columbia)
- James Harris (1950–2020), professional wrestler. "Kamala The Ugandan Giant," (Senatobia)
- Otis Harris (born 1982), Olympic track and field athlete (Edwards)
- Jimmy Hart (born 1944), professional wrestling manager (Jackson)
- Josh Hayes (born 1975), professional motorcycle roadracer (Gulfport)
- Floyd Heard (born 1966), track and field sprinter (West Point)
- Leroy Jones (1950–2010), professional boxer (Meridian)
- Sam Kendricks (born 1992), Olympic pole vaulter (Oxford)
- Bianca Knight (born 1989), Olympic track and field athlete (Ridgeland)
- Jason Knight (born 1992), mixed martial arts fighter (D'Iberville)
- Iris Kyle (born 1974), 10-time overall Ms. Olympia professional bodybuilder
- Justin Mapp (born 1984), professional soccer player (Brandon)
- Cory McGee (born 1992), Olympian, track and field middle-distance runner (Pass Christian)
- Kennedy McKinney (born 1966), professional boxer (Hernando)
- Coby Miller (born 1976), track and field athlete (Ackerman)
- Mary Mills (born 1940), professional golfer (Laurel)
- Larry Myricks (born 1956), Olympic long jumper (Clinton)
- Terri O'Connell (born 1964), motorsports racer (Corinth)
- Mathieu Olivier (born 1997), ice hockey player (Biloxi)
- Cliff Pace (born 1980), professional fisherman (Petal, Mississippi)
- Reed Pierce (born 1963), professional pool player (Jackson)
- Brittney Reese (born 1986), Olympic long jumper (Gulfport)
- Jeremiah Riggs (born 1982), professional wrestler (Vicksburg)
- Kevin Robertson (born 1959), Olympic water polo player (Biloxi)
- Matt Schnell (born 1990), mixed martial arts fighter (Amory)
- Chase Sherman (born 1989), mixed martial arts fighter (D'Iberville)
- Chris Shivers (born 1978), professional bull rider (Natchez)
- Calvin Smith (born 1961), Olympic sprinter (Bolton)
- Lake Speed (born 1948), NASCAR driver (Jackson)
- Ricky Stenhouse Jr. (born 1987), stock car driver (Olive Branch)
- Dallas Stewart (born 1959), thoroughbred horse trainer (McComb)
- Gil Stovall (born 1986), Olympic swimmer (Tupelo)
- Savante Stringfellow (born 1978), Olympic long jumper (Jackson)
- Ernie Terrell (1939–2014), former WBA heavyweight boxing champion (Belzoni)
- Charles Walker (born 1934), checkers champion and minister (Petal)
- Herb Washington (born 1951), sprinter/pinch runner (Belzoni)

== Broadcast media personalities ==
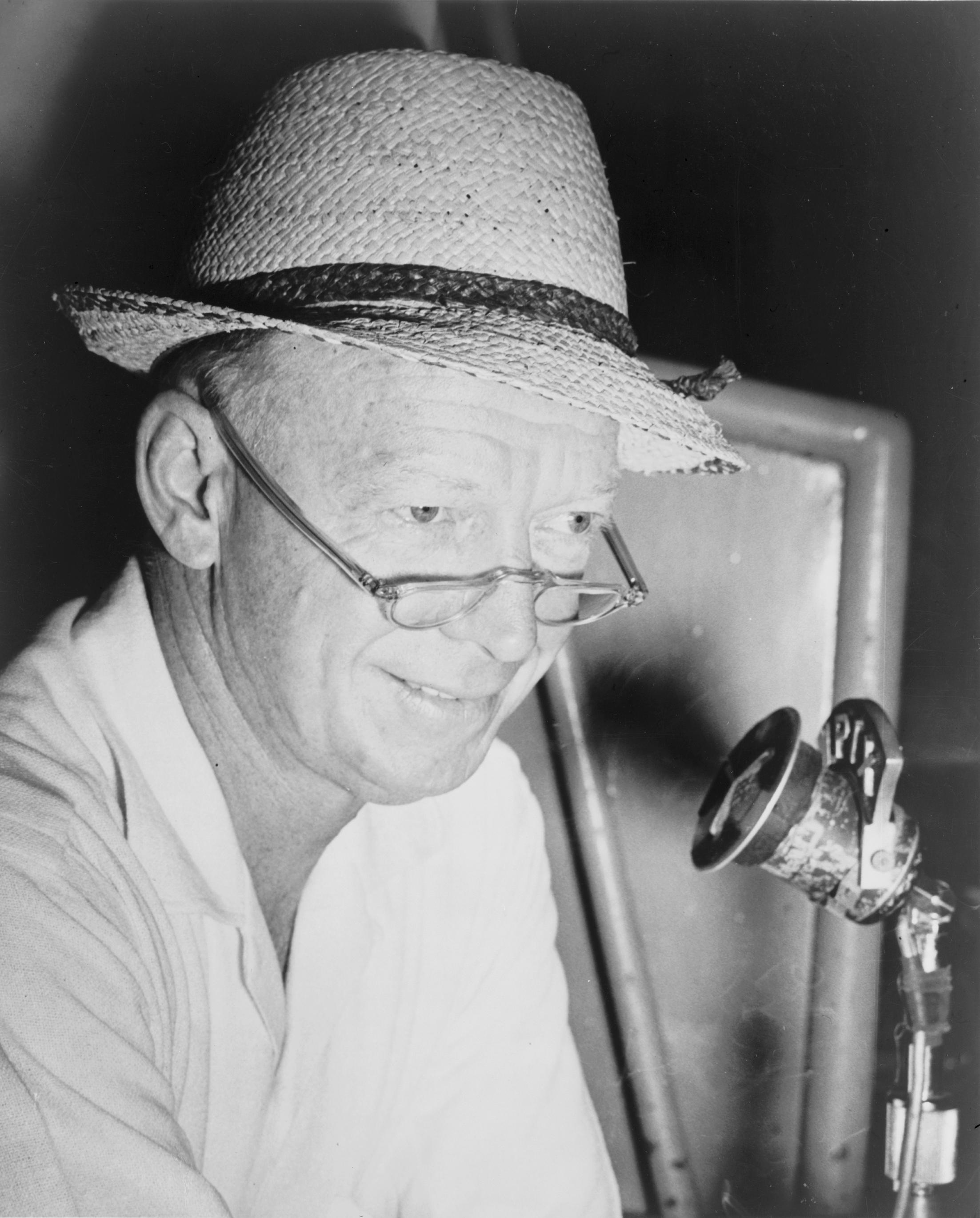
Red Barber

- Red Barber (1908–1992), sportscaster (Columbus)
- Ron Franklin (1942–2022), ESPN sportscaster (Jackson)

== See also ==
- List of people from Mississippi
