= Percy Dale East =

American journalist

- Born: November 21, 1921; Columbia, Mississippi, U.S.
- Died: December 31, 1971 (aged 50); Fairhope, Alabama, U.S.
- Occupation: Journalist
- Years active: 1951–1971

Percy Dale East (1921–1971) was an American journalist who founded and edited Petal, Mississippi's weekly newspaper, The Petal Paper. He is known for his use of satire to criticize white supremacy in Jim Crow-era Mississippi.

East was born in 1921 and was adopted as a baby by Jim and Birdie East from Columbia, Mississippi. He started working as a journalist for Mississippi labor union newspapers in 1951, before founding the Petal Paper in 1953. The paper's political views were unpopular in the local community of Petal, Mississippi but East received financial support from figures including Eleanor Roosevelt, Harry Golden, and Harry Belafonte.

== Published works ==
- East, P. D. (1960). The Magnolia Jungle: The Life, Times, and Education of a Southern Editor. New York: Simon and Schuster. OCLC 686720.
