= Charles Walker (checkers player) =

American checkers player (1934–2024)

Charles Clendell Walker (December 11, 1934 – August 12, 2024) was an American Mississippi state checkers (draughts) champion and Christian minister. He founded the International Checker Hall of Fame in Petal, Mississippi in 1979. Walker is also known in checkers history for his record-setting victories in simultaneous checkers matches. In a January 1992 match that lasted over eight hours, he played 229 checkers games simultaneously. He won 227 contests, lost one and tied one. In 1994, he set a Guinness World Record while playing 306 checkers games simultaneously and losing only one.

== Biography ==
Walker started playing checkers at a young age: "At age 7, his family was flooded out of its home. To pass time in the emergency shelter, he played checkers. Later he discovered his father-in-law was shy. He broke the ice by playing checkers with him on the front porch, and getting beaten." The game became his lifelong passion that defined much of his life, both public and private.

In the 1990s, Charles Walker helped organize and publicize several World Man-Machine Checkers Championship matches of the checkers computer called Chinook against several human players.

Walker was a long-term friend, admirer, and promoter of World Checkers champion Marion Tinsley, whom Walker described as "the greatest checkers player who ever lived," and "probably the greatest who ever will live".

Walker served as a Secretary of The American Checker Federation, was the Editor of Checkers Magazine and also served as President of World Checker Draught Federation.

Walker ran a successful insurance business and was described in the media as "an insurance millionaire" and an "insurance tycoon".

Walker was arrested by ICE agents on January 7, 2005 in an undercover sting operation and charged with attempted money laundering of "$6 million in represented drug smuggling proceeds". Charles Walker pleaded guilty on June 30, 2005. His sentencing had to be postponed twice, in particular because of Hurricane Katrina, but he was sentenced to five years in prison in January 2006. In January 2005, after his arrest, Walker announced that the International Checkers Hall of Fame was to be closed, and that he would resign his post as President of the World Checker Draught Federation. The International Checkers Hall of Fame was kept open until Walker's sentencing, but the building was destroyed by fire on September 29, 2007.

Walker died on August 12, 2024, at the age of 89.
