= Petal, Mississippi =

- City
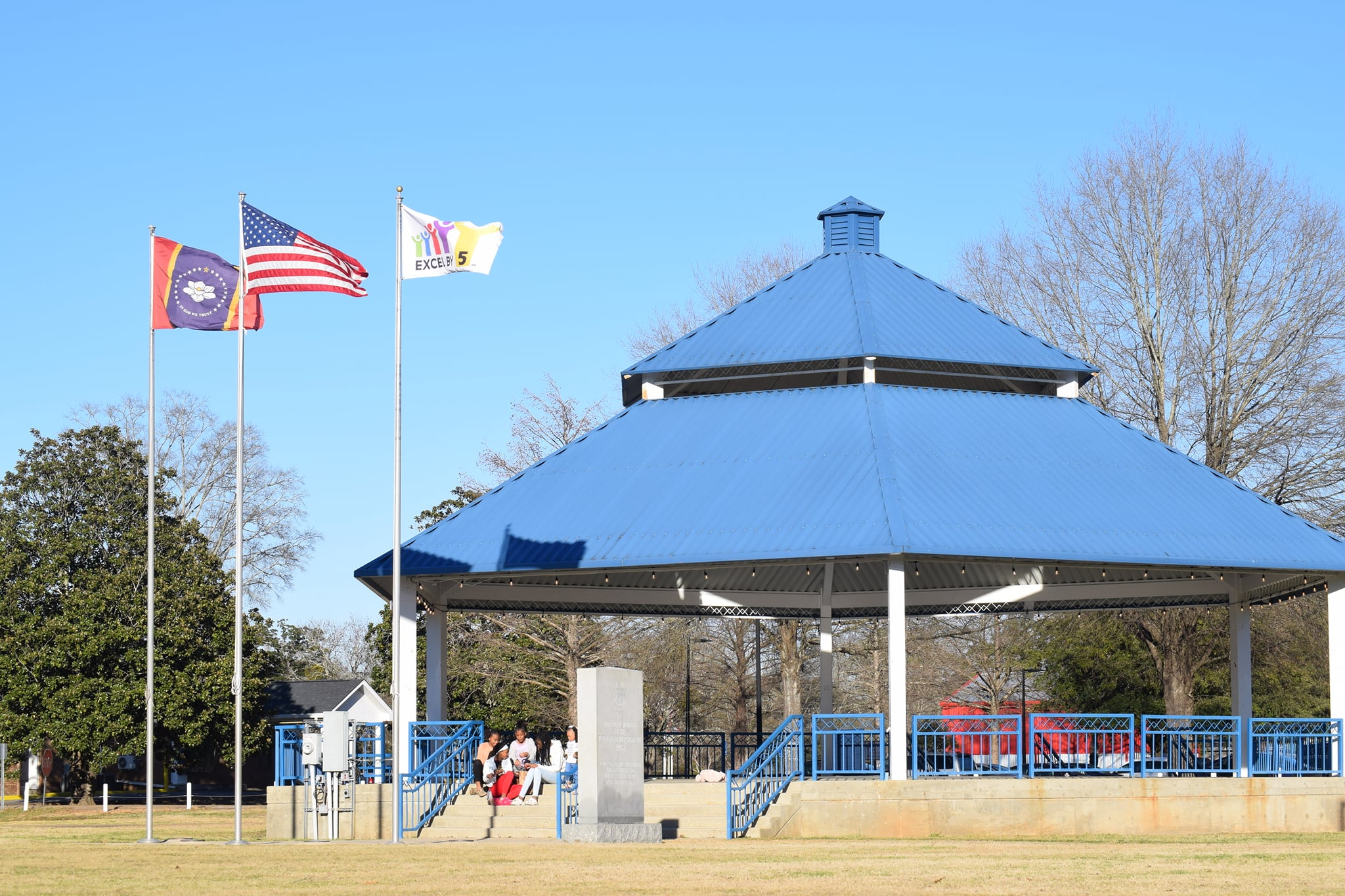
- Willie Hinton Park pavilion
- Nickname: The Friendly City
- Location of Petal, Mississippi

- Location in the United States
- Coordinates: 31°20′48″N 89°15′20″W
- Country: United States
- State: Mississippi
- County: Forrest

Government
  - Type: Mayor-Council
  - Mayor: Tony Ducker (R)
  - State Representatives: Percy Watson, Larry Byrd
  - State Senator: Chris Johnson

Area
  - Total: 17.15 sq mi (44.41 km^{2})
  - Land: 16.77 sq mi (43.44 km^{2})
  - Water: 0.37 sq mi (0.97 km^{2})
- Elevation: 157 ft (48 m)

Population (2020)
  - Total: 11,010
  - Density: 656.5/sq mi (253.48/km^{2})
- Time zone: UTC-6 (Central (CST))
  - Summer (DST): UTC-5 (CDT)
- ZIP code: 39465
- Area code: 601
- FIPS code: 28-56800
- GNIS feature ID: 0675641
- Website: www.cityofpetal.com

Petal is a city in Forrest County, Mississippi, along the Leaf River. It is part of the Hattiesburg, Mississippi Metropolitan Statistical Area. The population was 10,454 in the 2010 census, increasing to 11,010 in the 2020 census.

== History ==
The first postmaster of Petal was Irving A. Polk. The post office was established in 1903 and was named after the daughter of a first settler. It is the only city in the U.S. with this name. Petal incorporated on April 5, 1974. Petal was a community filled with farmers. This is slowly changing with new businesses coming into the city.

The International Checker Hall of Fame was located in Petal until September 29, 2007, when 20,000 square feet (1,900 m^{2}) of the 35,000-square-foot (3,300 m^{2}) building caught fire.

Petal was extensively damaged by an EF3 tornado on January 21, 2017.

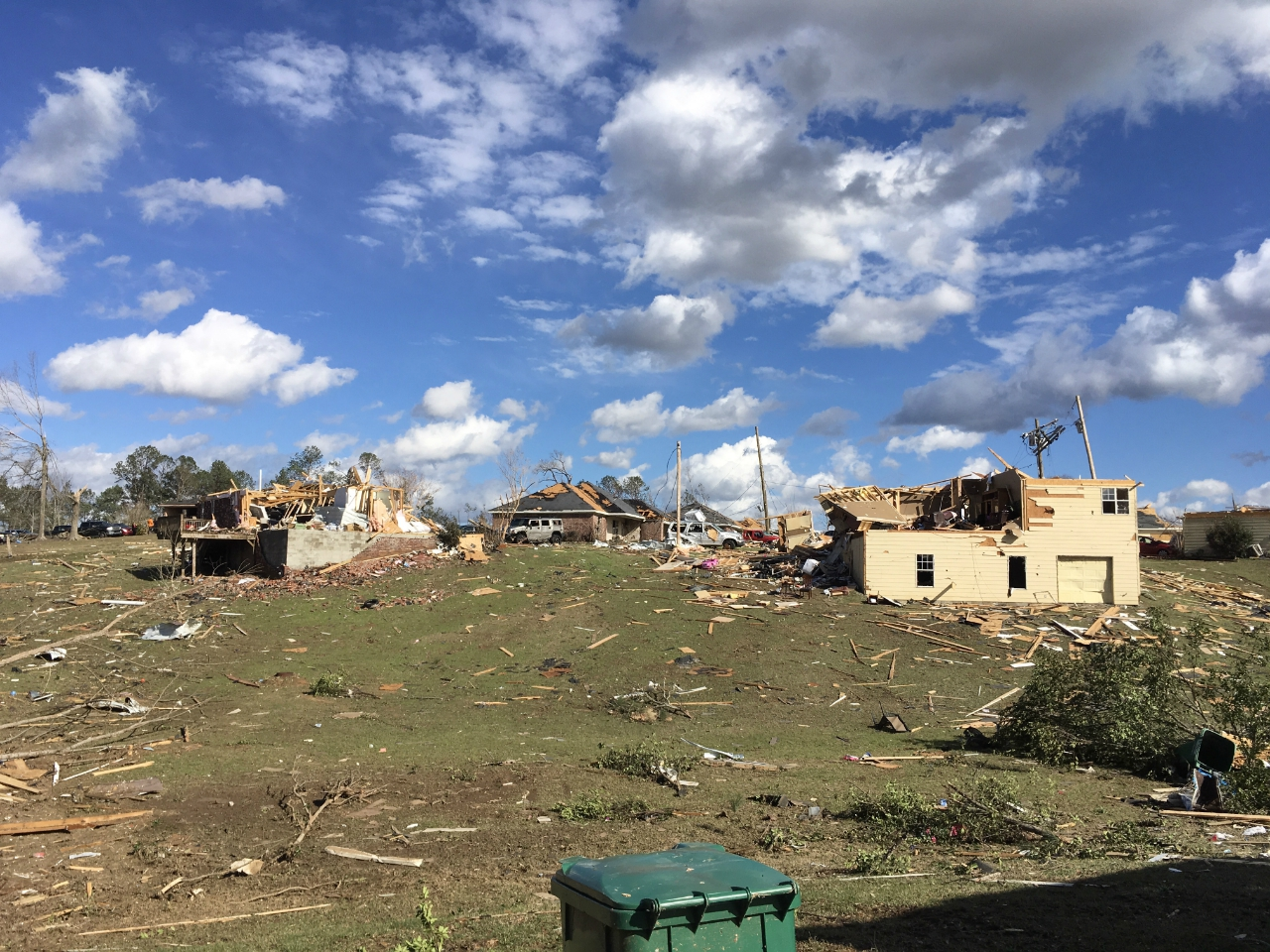
January 21, 2017, Petal, Mississippi, tornado damage

== Geography ==
As of the 2010 census, the city had a total area of 17.1 square miles (44.4 km^{2}), of which 16.9 square miles (43.7 km^{2}) was land and 0.3 square miles (0.7 km^{2}), or 1.62%, was water. The city's area had increased by nearly 75% since 2000, following an annexation effort approved in 2002. Major sub-communities as of the annex are Macedonia, Barrontown, Carterville, Sunrise, and Leeville. The Harvey community (currently downtown Petal) hosts city departments.

== Demographics ==
Historical population
Census	Pop.	Note	%±
1980	8,476		—
1990	7,883		−7.0%
2000	7,579		−3.9%
2010	10,454		37.9%
2020	11,010		5.3%
U.S. Decennial Census

=== 2020 census ===
As of the 2020 census, Petal had a population of 11,010. The median age was 36.1 years. 26.1% of residents were under the age of 18 and 15.4% of residents were 65 years of age or older. For every 100 females there were 90.8 males, and for every 100 females age 18 and over there were 84.7 males age 18 and over.

71.7% of residents lived in urban areas, while 28.3% lived in rural areas.

There were 4,111 households in Petal, of which 39.1% had children under the age of 18 living in them. Of all households, 50.0% were married-couple households, 14.2% were households with a male householder and no spouse or partner present, and 29.8% were households with a female householder and no spouse or partner present. About 22.4% of all households were made up of individuals and 10.7% had someone living alone who was 65 years of age or older. There were 2,746 families residing in the city.

There were 4,435 housing units, of which 7.3% were vacant. The homeowner vacancy rate was 1.9% and the rental vacancy rate was 8.1%.

Petal racial composition
Race	Num.	Perc.
White (non-Hispanic)	8,198	74.5%
Black or African American (non-Hispanic)	1,602	14.6%
Native American	20	0.2%
Asian	85	0.8%
Pacific Islander	1	0.0%
Other/Mixed	490	4.5%
Hispanic or Latino	614	5.6%

=== 2010 census ===
As of the census of 2010, there were 10,454 people, 3,918 households, and 2,867 families residing in the city. The population density was 619.8 people per square mile. There were 4,261 housing units at an average density of 331.7 per square mile. The racial makeup of the city was 86.1% White, 9.9% African American, 0.2% Native American, 0.7% Asian, 1.3% from other races, and 1.7% from two or more races. Hispanic or Latino of any race were 3.5% of the population.

There were 3,918 households, out of which 23.5% had own children under the age of 18 living with them, 53.1% were married couples living together, 14.6% had a female householder with no husband present, and 26.8% were non-families. 39.3% of all households were made up of individuals under 18 and 26.6% had someone living alone who was 65 years of age or older. The average household size was 2.65 and the average family size was 3.13.

The median income for a household in the city was $29,637, and the median income for a family was $35,343. Males had a median income of $27,500 versus $20,741 for females. The per capita income for the city was $13,996. About 11.9% of families and 15.0% of the population were below the poverty line, including 19.4% of those under age 18 and 13.8% of those age 65 or over.

Sex	16+	18+	21+	62+	65+	Median age
Male	3,702	3,537	3,325	730	596	35.8
Female	4,269	4,107	3,914	1,034	844	33.8
Overall	7,971	7,644	7,239	1,764	1,440	37.5

== Education ==
The city is served by the Petal School District.

== Notable people ==
- Larry Byrd, member of the Mississippi House of Representatives
- William Leon Clark, former Deputy Chief of Chaplains of the United States Air Force
- Percy Dale East, journalist
- Demarcus Evans, Major League Baseball pitcher
- Tom King, former member of the Mississippi State Senate
- Dan M. Lee, Justice of the Supreme Court of Mississippi from 1981 to 1998
- Mike Lott, former member Mississippi House of Representatives (2000-2008); current Alderman-at-Large
- Kris Mangum, professional football player
- Cliff Pace, 43rd World Champion of Bass Fishing, 2013 Bassmaster Classic
- Javon Patterson, professional football player
- Ray Perkins, University of Alabama wide receiver; attended Petal High School, where he was an All-American
- Nate Rolison, former Major League Baseball first baseman
- Charles Walker, former Mississippi state checkers champion
- Tom Walters, safety for the Washington Commanders
