= International Checker Hall of Fame =

Former museum in Mississippi, United States

Coordinates: 31.373423°N 89.247490°W

The International Checker Hall of Fame (ICHF) operated from 1979 to September 29, 2007, when a fire burned over 20,000 square feet with smoke and water damage on the 15,000 balance. The ICHF was founded by Charles Walker, who was many times MS State Checker Champion. The ICHF was located in a Tudor architecture style mansion in Petal, Mississippi; it housed a large collection of checkers memorabilia. The hall of fame, which had been home to a statue of checkers-great Marion Tinsley, contained a checkers book library and museum, as well as the two largest checkerboards and was host to a number of State and International checker tournaments.

Due to the Katrina Storm claims, the Insurance Company canceled coverage on several of the larger properties which included the ICHF facility ten days before the fire. Without coverage combined with the fact that the lowest bid to rebuild was two and one half million dollars. This temporarily delayed the rebuilding, but ICHF has been rebuilt, restocked and has hosted and housed several international events.

The Hall of Fame opened in May 1979 and was officially dedicated during the world checker championship during the same year. It provided a tourism boost to the small town of Petal and was considered to be the town's biggest claim to fame during its operation.

Featuring the world's largest checkerboard, the 35,000-square-foot (3,300 m^{2}) Tudor-style mansion, Chateau Walker is listed in Ripley's Believe It or Not! The mansion is designed with a balcony that overlooked the largest checkerboard, which has played host to a number of checkers tournaments throughout its existence as well as the World Checker Championship. The museum also featured a bust of Marion Tinsley, considered to be a checkers great, together with a letter from Tinsley renouncing his championship. The hall also features a museum with photos of current and former champions, a teaching facility, as well as the world's second largest checkerboard. The fire destroyed 20,000 square feet (1,900 m^{2}) of the museum but there were no injuries. The ICHF repairs were completed in 2009 and has housed and will continue to host World Checker Events.
