= Earl Blair =

American football player (1934–2004)

No. 82
- Position: Halfback

Personal information
- Born: January 10, 1934; Pascagoula, Mississippi, U.S.
- Died: December 25, 2004 (aged 70); Overland Park, Kansas, U.S.

Career information
- College: Ole Miss (1952–1955)

Career history
- Toronto Argonauts (1956)

Earl E. Blair (January 10, 1934 – December 25, 2004) was an American football player.

Blair was an All-Big-8 performer at Pascagoula High School as a halfback in Pascagoula, MS his senior year, 1951. He signed a scholarship with the University of Mississippi and lettered four years as a halfback and lettered three years for the track team. He played in the 1952 Sugar Bowl (Ga. Tech), 1954 Sugar Bowl (Navy), and the 1955 Cotton Bowl Classic (TCU). He also played in the 1956 Senior Bowl in Mobile. He signed and played one year with Toronto Argonauts in the Canadian Football League before going into the Army. He lived in Overland Park, Kansas where he retired from the Nabisco Company. He was inducted into the Pascagoula, MS High School Sports Hall of Fame in August 2023.

He married Shirley King of Pascagoula and they had two children, Mitzi and Abby. They also went on to get married and have children. Mitzi married Dennis Riffer and they had two daughters, Cassie and Jenna. Abby married Randy Sims (now divorced) and had two girls, Paige and Callie. Earl suffered from lung cancer and died on December 25, 2004, in Overland Park, Kansas.
