= Quinton Meaders =

American gridiron football player (born 1984)

No. 20
- Position: Defensive back

Personal information
- Born: December 21, 1983 (age 42); Tupelo, Mississippi, U.S.
- Listed height: 6 ft 0 in (1.83 m)
- Listed weight: 190 lb (86 kg)

Career information
- College: Itawamba CC
- NFL draft: 2009: undrafted

Career history
- Calgary Stampeders (2009)*; Toronto Argonauts (2010)*; Mississippi Hound Dogs (2012)
- * Offseason or practice squad member only

Quinton Meaders (born December 21, 1983) is an American former professional football defensive back. He was signed by the Calgary Stampeders as a street free agent in 2009. He played college football at Itawamba Community College.

On May 28, 2010, Meaders signed with the Toronto Argonauts, but was later released by the team on June 5, 2010.

In 2012, Meaders signed with his hometown Mississippi Hound Dogs.
