= Long Beach State athletics =

Collegiate athletic teams of California State University, Long Beach

Long Beach State Beach
- University: California State University, Long Beach
- Nickname: The Beach
- NCAA: Division I
- Conference: Big West Conference (primary); Mountain Pacific Sports Federation (indoor track & field)
- Athletic director: Bobby Smitheran
- Location: Long Beach, California
- Varsity teams: 19
- Basketball arena: Walter Pyramid
- Baseball stadium: Blair Field
- Softball stadium: LBSU Softball Complex
- Soccer stadium: George Allen Field
- Other venues: Jack Rose Track; Lindgren Aquatics Center; Rhodes Tennis Center; Virginia Country Club
- Colors: Black and gold
- Mascot: Elbee (2018–present); Prospector Pete (1949–2018)
- Website: longbeachstate.com
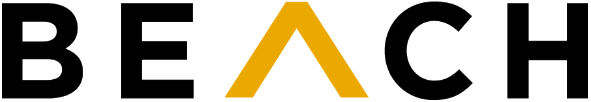

Long Beach State athletics, or simply Beach athletics (previously known as the 49ers), are the athletic teams that represent California State University, Long Beach. Teams compete in 19 sports at the National Collegiate Athletic Association (NCAA) Division I level. Long Beach State is a founding member of the Big West Conference, and also competes in the Mountain Pacific Sports Federation and the Golden Coast Conference for sports not sponsored by the Big West.

== Sports sponsored ==
Men's sports	Women's sports
Baseball	Basketball
Basketball	Beach volleyball
Cross country	Cross country
Golf	Golf
Track and field^{1}	Soccer
Volleyball	Softball
Water polo	Tennis
	Track and field^{1}
	Volleyball
	Water polo
^{1} – includes both indoor and outdoor

=== Baseball ===
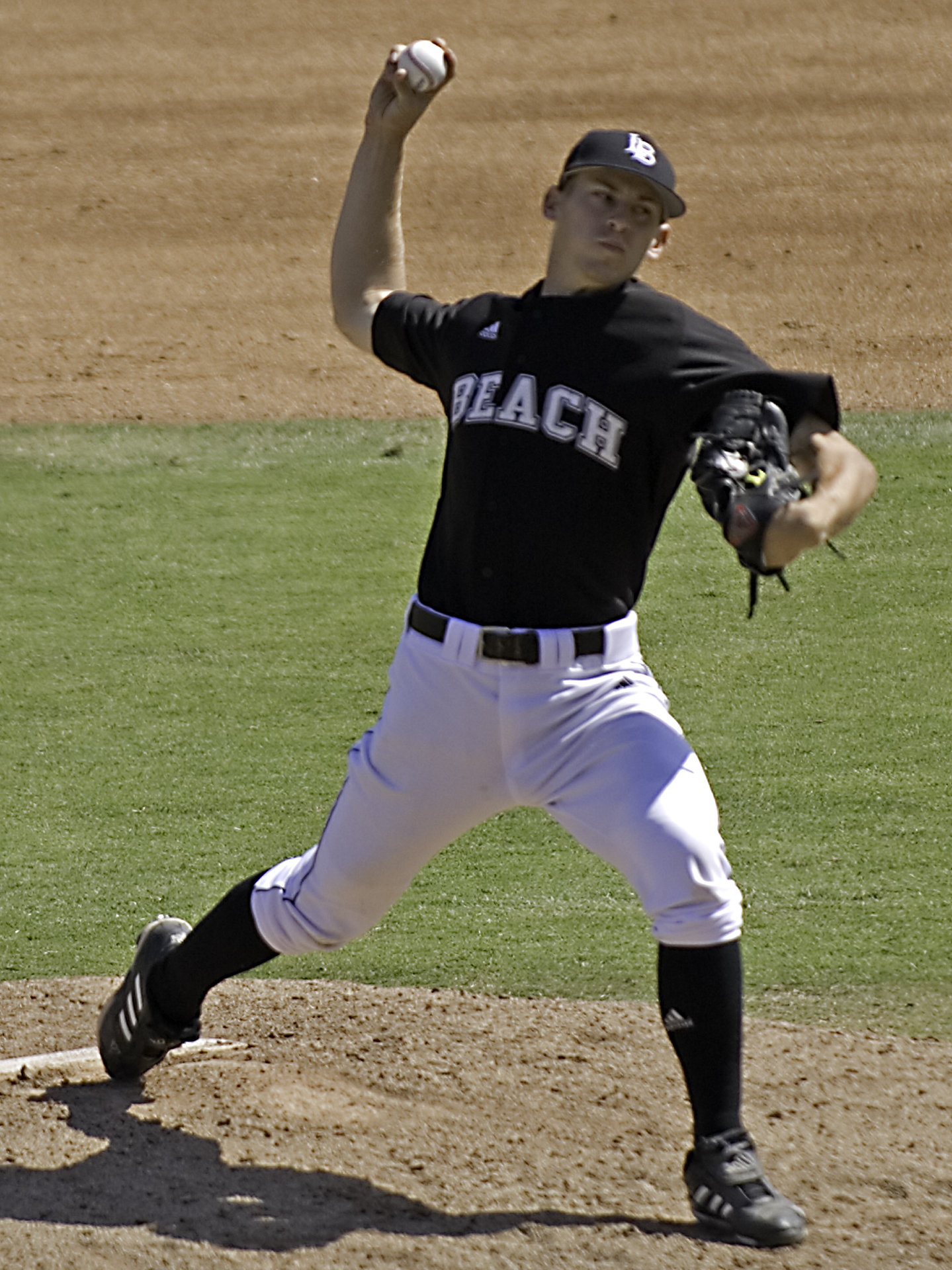
A Dirtbags baseball player during a 2007 game at Blair Field

Unlike all other Long Beach State sports teams, the baseball team unofficially goes under the moniker "The Dirtbags." After the hiring of Dave Snow as head coach in 1989, the LBSU baseball team has become one of the most successful teams in the school's athletic history. From 1989 to 2008, the Dirtbags appeared in 17 of the 20 NCAA tournaments and were consistently ranked in the national top 35. Along the way, the team won 9 Big West conference championships, hosted 5 NCAA regionals (plus 1 super regional), and appeared in 4 College World Series (1989, 1991, 1993 and 1998). The Dirtbags nickname refers to a gritty, team first style of play taught by Coach Snow and subsequent coaches.

The school has also produced a number of prominent professional players over the years, including former American League MVP Jason Giambi, former American League Rookie of the Year Bobby Crosby, and all-star and 2008 American League Rookie of the Year Evan Longoria. Many more ex-Dirtbags have participated in the prestigious MLB All-Star Futures game, including Jered Weaver, Troy Tulowitzki, Danny Espinosa, and Jarren Duran. As of 2024, 57 Long Beach State baseball alumni have played in the big leagues.

The baseball team plays off campus at 3,238-seat Blair Field in Recreation Park (center of city; 1.7 miles off campus). Opened in 1956 and remodeled in 1992, Blair Field has been the full-time Long Beach State home field since 1993.

=== Basketball ===
Long Beach State men's and women's basketball teams compete in the Big West Conference. The teams play their home games at the Walter Pyramid.

==== Men's basketball ====
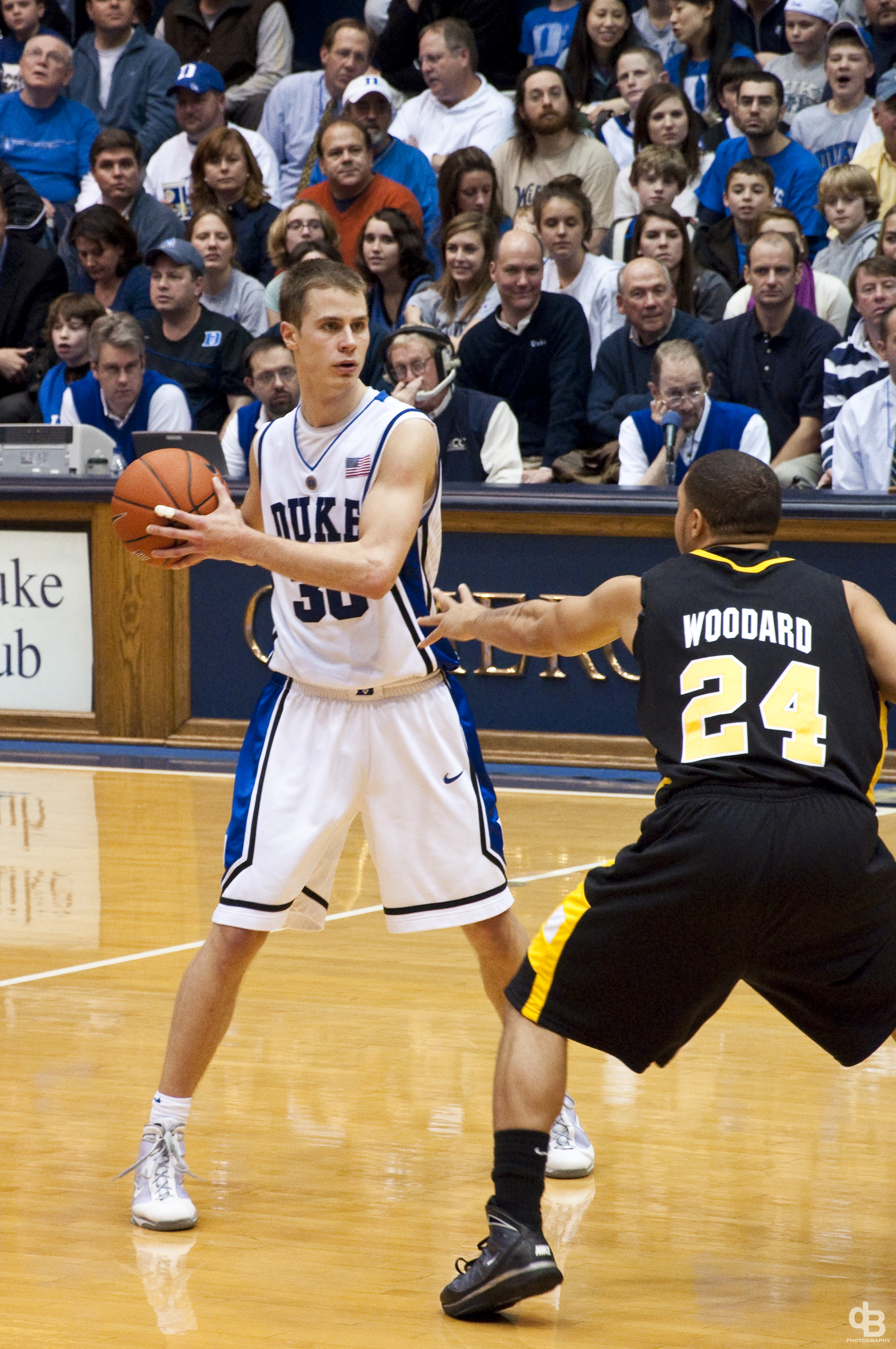
Long Beach (in black) v Duke game in 2009

On April 6, 2007, it was announced that Dan Monson (formerly of Gonzaga University and the University of Minnesota) would become Long Beach State's next head men's basketball coach, succeeding Larry Reynolds.

==== Women's basketball ====
The women's basketball team had its greatest success during the 1980s when coached by Joan Bonvicini for 12 years. During that time the team went 325–71. The Beach won 10 Big West Conference titles, made 10 straight NCAA appearances, had 12 consecutive winning seasons, and never won fewer than 24 games in a season. Bonvicini guided the Beach to Final Four appearances in 1987 and 1988.

=== Track & Field ===
Long Beach State's Track & Field program has produced 19 Olympians, including five former World Record holders and six American Record holders. Four alumni have won Olympic medals, primarily in jumping and throwing events.

In the high jump Dwight Stones, Joni Huntley and John Rambo all won Olympic bronze medals in 1964, 1972, 1976, and 1984, with Stones placing third back-to-back in 1972 and 1976 and a 4th place finish in 1984. Among the most accomplished of the university's athletes in any sport, Dwight Stones broke the World Record indoors and outdoors 10 times, the American Record 13 times, and appeared on the cover of Sports Illustrated twice-once in a LBSU uniform. Stones is among the most decorated American Track and Field athletes in history, with an astounding 19 USA national titles to his record. He later went on to a long career as a Track & Field commentator in network television. Joni Huntley competed in the 1976 and 1984 Olympics, winning a bronze medal in 1984 and setting four American Records. John Rambo, a standout athlete in both basketball and Track & Field, won a bronze medal in 1964 and established an indoor American Record. He also played professional basketball.Pole vaulter Steve Smith competed in the 1972 Olympics, and broke the World Record twice indoors.

In the throws Kate Schmidt won the Olympic bronze medal in 1972 and 1976 in the javelin, setting a World Record. Hammer Thrower Bill Green set three American Records, three American Collegiate Records (three of six on the LBSU field), and placed 5th in the Olympic Games in 1984. George Frenn was a two-sport champion, making the 1972 Olympic team in the hammer throw, breaking the World Record multiple times in the indoor weight throw, and holding the World Record for 13 years in the early days of the sport of powerlifting. His multi-sport success resulted in a cover photo and feature in Sports Illustrated in 1970.

Distance runner Francie Larrieu Smith had one of the longest international careers in Track and Field, making five Olympic teams between 1972 and 1992 with a best showing of 5th place in 1988 in the 10,000 meters. She set 13 World Records indoors, which included the mile.

The Track and Field program has won eight Big West Men's Track and Field Championships and three Women's Championships in the last 35 years, and has had 77 All-American athletes, won 32 conference Athlete of the Year awards, and achieved 24 Track and Field Athlete of the Year accolades.

=== Cross country ===
The Long Beach State Beach men's cross country team appeared in the NCAA tournament six times, with their highest finish being 10th place in the 1971–72 school year.

Year	Ranking	Points	Notes
1969	No. 17	430	Defeated Tennessee, Cal Poly Pomona, Princeton, Kansas, Missouri, Georgetown, Cincinnati, Virginia Tech, St. John's, Murray State, Harvard, and Florida; Lost to UTEP, Villanova, Oregon, Washington State, Illinois, Western Michigan, Minnesota, Penn, Bowling Green, Penn State, Connecticut, Houston, Miami (OH), Manhattan, Nebraska, and Providence
1970	No. 23	548	Defeated Lehigh, Illinois, Cornell, Alabama, Cincinnati, Harvard, Texas, Kentucky, North Carolina, SMU, West Chester, Virginia Tech, Furman, East Carolina, Virginia, and The Citadel; Lost to Villanova, Oregon, UTEP, Indiana, Western Michigan, Missouri, Michigan State, Bowling Green, San Diego State, William & Mary, Pittsburgh, Minnesota, Penn State, Oklahoma State, Colorado, BYU, Duke, Manhattan, Houston, Kansas State, East Tennessee State, and Penn
1971	No. 10	323	Defeated Miami (OH), Duke, Michigan State, Wichita State, Cornell, Indiana, William & Mary, Ball State, American, Murray State, Tennessee, Kentucky, Air Force, Princeton, North Carolina, Colorado, Providence, Texas, Florida, and Louisiana; Lost to Oregon, Washington State, Penn, Villanova, East Tennessee State, Kansas State, Bowling Green, Penn State, and Northern Arizona
1972	No. 23	614	Defeated Alabama, Rice, Arkansas, and Houston; Lost to Tennessee, East Tennessee State, Oregon, Washington State, Miami (OH), Bowling Green, Oklahoma State, BYU, Manhattan, Indiana, William & Mary, Penn State, Eastern Michigan, Kansas, Wisconsin, Oregon State, Maryland, Princeton, Montana, Arizona, Navy, and Kentucky
1974	No. 26	660	Defeated Arkansas and Syracuse; Lost to Oregon, Western Kentucky, UTEP, Washington State, Providence, Eastern Michigan, Georgetown, Massachusetts, Wisconsin, Penn State, Duke, Michigan, BYU, Iowa State, Navy, Kentucky, Wichita State, Maryland, Missouri, Minnesota, East Tennessee State, Montana, Kent State, Florida, and Kansas State
1975	No. 30	737	Defeated Dartmouth and Florida; Lost to UTEP, Washington State, Providence, Penn State, East Tennessee State, Western Kentucky, BYU, Colorado State, Wisconsin, Illinois, Oregon, Kansas State, Arkansas, New Mexico, Princeton, Tennessee, Indiana, Northeastern, Georgetown, Colorado, Maryland, Michigan, William & Mary, Pittsburgh, Navy, Navy, Wichita State, Penn, Kent State, and Rice

The Long Beach State Beach women's cross country team has never made the NCAA tournament.

=== Women's soccer ===
The Long Beach State women's soccer team have an NCAA Division I Tournament record of 3–7 through seven appearances.

Big West Conference in Long Beach logo

Year	Round	Opponent	Result
2008	First round	San Diego	L 0–1
2010	First round	Santa Clara	L 0–1
2011	First round Second Round; Third round Quarterfinals	Pepperdine; Miami (FL); San Diego; Duke	W 1–0; W 1–0; W 1–0; L 0–2
2012	First round	Santa Clara	L 1–2
2015	First round	Santa Clara	L 0–1
2016	First round	Santa Clara	L 0–3
2018	First round	USC	L 0–6

=== Women's tennis ===
Long Beach State women's tennis team ('Beach Tennis') competes in the Big West Conference. As of the end of the 2018–19 season, the team has won thirteen Big West tennis titles since 2002 and qualified for thirteen NCAA tournament championships since 2002; advancing to the Round of 32 three times.

Head Coach Jenny Hilt-Costello has won a league record eight Big West Conference Coach of the Year awards (2001, 2004, 2005, 2006, 2008, 2009, 2012, 2014) and was named the ITA West Region Coach of the Year and a finalist for the national award in 2004.

The women's tennis team plays at the Terry L. Rhodes Tennis Center, which opened on campus Fall 2008. The tennis center is named after 49er alumnus Terry Rhodes following his $1.25 million gift to the women's tennis program. Rhodes' gift is the largest single sport donation in university history. The new facility also includes The Gloria and Bob Hendricks Family Scoreboard, a 40-foot (12 m) high electronic display of all matches donated by the family of the former 49er women's tennis head coach.

=== Volleyball ===
==== Men's volleyball ====
The men's volleyball competed in the Mountain Pacific Sports Federation and now in the Big West Conference. They won the MPSF regular season title in 2008 and 2017 and the Big West regular season titles in 2018, 2019, 2022, 2023*, 2024 and 2025. While winning the Big West Conference Tournament Championship in 2018, 2024 and 2026. They won the 1991, 2018, 2019, and 2025 NCAA Men's Volleyball Championship and have placed second seven times.

- * Co-Champion

As of 2026, the Long Beach State men's volleyball team have an NCAA Division I Tournament record of 25–13 (.658) through sixteen appearances.

Year	Round	Opponent	Result
1970	Pools; Pools; Pools; Semifinals; National Championship	Ball State; UC Santa Barbara; UCLA; Ball State; UCLA	W 2–0; W 2–0; L 1–2; W 3–1; L 0–3
1973	Pools; Pools; Pools; Semifinals; National Championship	Ball State; Army; San Diego State; Army; San Diego State	W 2–0; W 2–0; W 2–1; W 3–0; L 1–3
1990	Semifinals; National Championship	Rutgers–Newark; USC	W 3–0; L 1–3
1991	Semifinals; National Championship	Penn State; USC	W 3–0; W 3–1
1999	Semifinals; National Championship	Purdue Fort Wayne; BYU	W 3–2; L 0–3
2004	Semifinals; National Championship	Penn State; BYU	W 3–0; L 2–3
2008	Semifinals	Pepperdine	L 0–3
2016	Quarterfinals; Semifinals	Erskine; BYU	W 3–0; L 1–3
2017	Semifinals	BYU	L 0–3
2018	Semifinals; National Championship	Ohio State; UCLA	W 3–1; W 3–2
2019	Semifinals; National Championship	Pepperdine; Hawai'i	W 3–1; W 3–1
2022	Semifinals; National Championship	UCLA; Hawai'i	W 3–2; L 0–3
2023	Quarterfinals; Semifinals	Grand Canyon; UCLA	W 3–1; L 0–3
2024	Quarterfinals; Semifinals; National Championship	Belmont Abbey; Grand Canyon; UCLA	W 3–0; W 3–2; L 1–3
2025	Quarterfinals; Semifinals; National Championship	Fort Valley State; Pepperdine; UCLA	W 3–0; W 3–1; W 3–0
2026	Regional Finals; Semifinals	Loyola Chicago; Hawai'i	W 3–0; L 1–3

==== Women's volleyball ====
Long Beach State is home to one of the top women's volleyball teams in the nation. LBSU alumnus Brian Gimmillaro has coached the team since 1985 and his tenure is the second-longest of any Long Beach State coach with one team. Long Beach State has appeared in the NCAA tournament 25 consecutive times under Gimmillaro from 1987 to 2011, only missing the tournament under his tenure in 1986 and 2012.

Long Beach State has won five national titles in women's volleyball, in 1972, 1973, 1989, 1993 and 1998, the first two being AIAW championships. The 1998 women's team was the first team in NCAA Division I history to have an undefeated season. The team's most famous alumna is Misty May, who won three Olympic gold medals in Beach Volleyball in 2004, 2008, and 2012.

The Long Beach State Beach women's volleyball team have an NCAA Division I Tournament record of 49–24 (.671) through twenty-seven appearances.

Year	Round	Opponent	Result
1985	First round	San Jose State	L 0–3
1987	First round	Pacific	L 0–3
1988	First round Regional semifinals	UC Irvine; Pacific	W 3–2; L 1–3
1989	First round Regional semifinals Regional Finals; Semifinals; National Championship	San Diego State; Pacific; Hawaii; UT Arlington; Nebraska	W 3–0; W 3–1; W 3–2; W 3–1; W 3–0
1990	First round Regional semifinals Regional Finals	San Jose State; Hawaii; Pacific	W 3–0; W 3–1; L 1–3
1991	First round Regional semifinals Regional Finals; Semifinals; National Championship	Northern Iowa; UC Santa Barbara; Hawaii; LSU; UCLA	W 3–0; W 3–1; W 3–2; W 3–1; L 2–3
1992	First round Regional semifinals Regional Finals; Semifinals	Arkansas State; Illinois State; Pacific; Stanford	W 3–1; W 3–0; W 3–1; L 1–3
1993	Second Round; Regional semifinals Regional Finals; Semifinals; National Championship	George Washington; Ohio State; Hawaii; Florida; Penn State	W 3–0; W 3–1; W 3–0; W 3–0; W 3–1
1994	Second Round; Regional semifinals Regional Finals	Montana; Hawaii; Ohio State	W 3–0; W 3–2; L 1–3
1995	First round Second Round	Colorado State; San Diego State	W 3–0; L 1–3
1996	Second Round; Regional semifinals	Minnesota; Michigan State	W 3–0; L 1–3
1997	Second Round; Regional semifinals Regional Finals; Semifinals	Loyola Marymount; Washington; Nebraska; Stanford	W 3–0; W 3–0; W 3–0; L 1–3
1998	First round Second Round; Regional semifinals Regional Finals; Semifinals; National Championship	Southern; Arizona; Illinois; Texas; Florida; Penn State	W 3–0; W 3–0; W 3–0; W 3–0; W 3–0; W 3–2
1999	First round Second Round; Regional semifinals Regional Finals; Semifinals	Florida A&M; Arkansas; Colorado State; Texas A&M; Stanford	W 3–0; W 3–0; W 3–1; W 3–0; L 0–3
2000	First round Second Round; Regional semifinals	San Jose State; Santa Clara; Hawaii	W 3–1; W 3–2; L 2–3
2001	First round Second Round; Regional semifinals Regional Finals; Semifinals; National Championship	San Diego State; San Diego; Northern Iowa; UCLA; Arizona; Stanford	W 3–0; W 3–0; W 3–0; W 3–0; W 3–0; L 0–3
2002	First round	UCLA	L 0–3
2003	First round	Kansas	L 0–3
2004	First round Second Round	Utah; UCLA	W 3–0; L 0–3
2005	First round	San Diego	L 1–3
2006	First round Second Round	Pepperdine; Hawaii	W 3–1; L 1–3
2007	First round Second Round	UNLV; USC	W 3–2; L 2–3
2008	First round Second Round	Pepperdine; Stanford	W 3–1; L 0–3
2009	First round	UCLA	L 0–3
2010	First round	San Diego	L 0–3
2011	First round	San Diego	L 1–3
2014	First round Second Round	San Diego; UCLA	W 3–0; L 0–3

=== Water polo ===
The Long Beach State men's water polo team competes in the Big West Conference.

The men's team has an NCAA Division I Tournament record of 7–12 through twelve appearances.

Year	Round	Opponent	Result
1969	First round Semifinals	Yale; UCLA	W 17–1; L 6–9
1970	First round Semifinals	Colorado State; UC Irvine	W 9–7; L 6–9
1971	First round Semifinals	New Mexico; UCLA	W 13–8; L 1–10
1973	First round	UC Irvine	L 5–7
1975	First round	California	L 6–9
1981	First round Semifinals; National Championship	Air Force; California; Stanford	W 15–6; W 11–9; L 6–17
1983	First round Semifinals	UCLA; California	W 10–8; L 5–8
1985	First round	UC Santa Barbara	L 6–7
1988	First round	Stanford	L 4–5
1989	First round	Pepperdine	L 8–13
1991	First round	UC Irvine	L 8–11
2018	First round Quarterfinals	Pomona–Pitzer; UC San Diego	W 12–5; L 9–14

The Long Beach State women's water polo team competes in the Big West Conference.

== Former varsity sports ==
=== Football ===
Long Beach State competed in Division I football for a number of years (1969–91), producing a number of professional players, including Terrell Davis and Mike Horan, among others. George Allen, the famed Los Angeles Rams and Washington Redskins coach, had a short one-year tenure at Long Beach State. Long Beach State discontinued its football program after the 1991 season due to budget constraints. Prior to going Division I in 1969 the football team competed in the old "College Division" of the NCAA from 1955 through 1968.

=== Rowing (Crew) ===
Long Beach State Rowing, also known as Beach Crew, was initially a varsity sport but has since become a club sport following nationwide changes to the organization of collegiate rowing following the introduction of Title IX.

== Non-varsity sports ==
In addition to NCAA-sanctioned sports, Long Beach State also fields numerous competitive club sports teams, such as rugby, ice hockey, ultimate, soccer, crew, archery, skiing and many others.

=== Rowing (crew) ===
Long Beach State Rowing, more popularly known as "Beach Crew," was founded in the fall semester of 1957, and continues to be one of the oldest, continuous, collegiate sports on campus. The team is currently run through the office of Club Sports & Recreation, but has been a part of the CSULB athletic department in past years. The team was co-founded by Bill Lockyer, a local businessman of Long Beach, and Dr. Ludwig Spolyar, a campus activities adviser. Lockyer, who coached for over a decade, was succeeded by Ed Graham in 1970.

Long Beach State Rowing is a member of the Western Intercollegiate Rowing Association (WIRA), whose participants are mostly non-Pac-10 schools on the West Coast. The team is a founding member of the American Collegiate Rowing Association (ACRA), the national collegiate organization whose members are not eligible to compete in the National NCAA Championships or the Intercollegiate Rowing Association Championships.

In the 2022 spring season Long Beach State’s double sculls placed first in WIRA. The team overall would later place 9th in small boats at ACRA and became the 2nd best small boats program on the west coast.

In 2025 the Women’s crew became national champions in the coxed four (4+)

The team is currently coached by former US National Team member Scott Erwin, John O’Donnell, and former Russian National Team member Aleksei Ivanov.

Beach Crew rows in Alamitos Bay and Marine Stadium in Long Beach. The boathouse, The Pete Archer Rowing Center, was established in 1932. Marine Stadium was built for the 1932 Olympics and is listed as a historic landmark by the State of California. In 2020 it was announced that Marine Stadium will once again host Olympic Rowing in 2028.

=== Rugby ===
Founded in 1974, the Long Beach State Rugby Club plays college rugby at the Long Beach State rugby field. The rugby team moved up from playing as a Division I-AA member of the Golden Coast Conference of Intercollegiate Rugby and became a Division I-A member of the California Collegiate Conference in 2022, which also means moving from American College Rugby to the College Rugby Association of America, the top level of college rugby recognized by USA Rugby. Long Beach has had a strong history winning 16 League Championships, 21 tournament championships, 1 National Championship appearance(loss to Air Force 1989), 13 All-Americans and 3 US Eagles. In 1995 Chris Rohrbach received the Woodley Award (Rugby Heisman) as the Collegiate player of the year. More recently Long Beach has been successful, Winning conference championships in 2012, 2013, 2014, 2015. Long Beach has also reached the national playoffs in 2011, 2012, 2013, 2014 & 2015. Long Beach is led by Head Coach Jason Reynolds.

=== Archery ===
Long Beach State Archery Club (LBSAC) is the longest continuously running collegiate archery club in the nation. The club was first created and coached by Mel Leach, a former assistant coach for the United States Archery Team in 1996. Currently, Long Beach State Archery Club is led by Head Coach Wendy Whalen, a USA Archery Level 4 NTS Coach, Level 3 National Judge, World Archery Continental Judge, and 2018 Traditional National Champion.

== Facilities ==
- Blair Field: opened in 1956 and home to the baseball team. It was renamed "Bohl Diamond at Blair Field" after Marilyn Bohl, supporter and donator.
- George Allen Field: home to the women's soccer team. It was opened in 1991 and dedicated to NFL coach George Allen (1918–1990).
- Jack Rose Track: athletics track, named after Long Beach track and field coach Jack Rose.
- Ken Lindgren Aquatics Center: an olympic-sized swimming pool, home to the men's and women's water polo teams.
- Rhodes Tennis Center: Inaugurated in 2008 as home to the women's tennis program. It was named after Terry Rhodes, contributor.
- Walter Pyramid: a pyramid-shaped indoor arena, home to the basketball and volleyball teams of the University.

=== Gallery ===
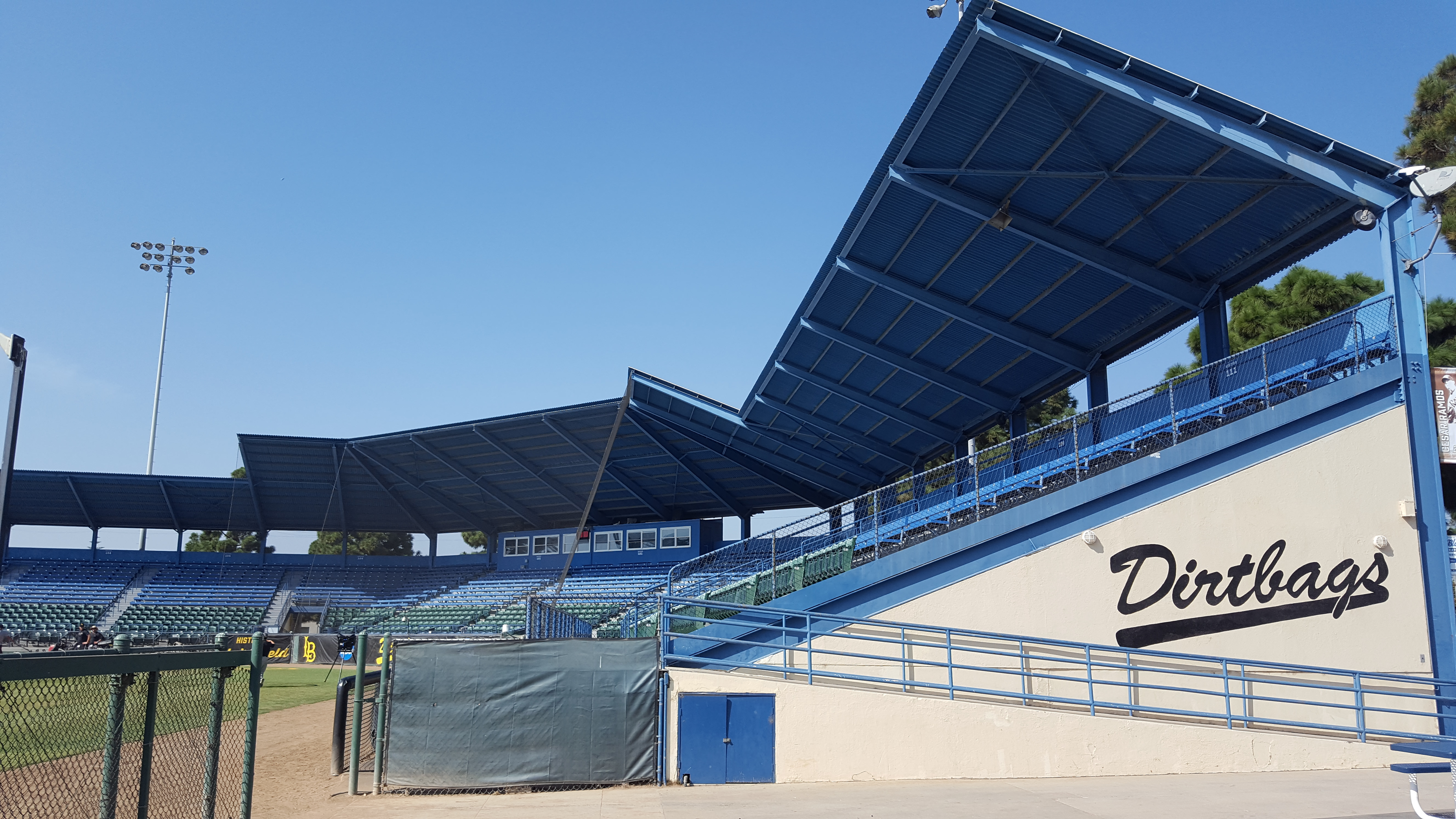
Blair Field

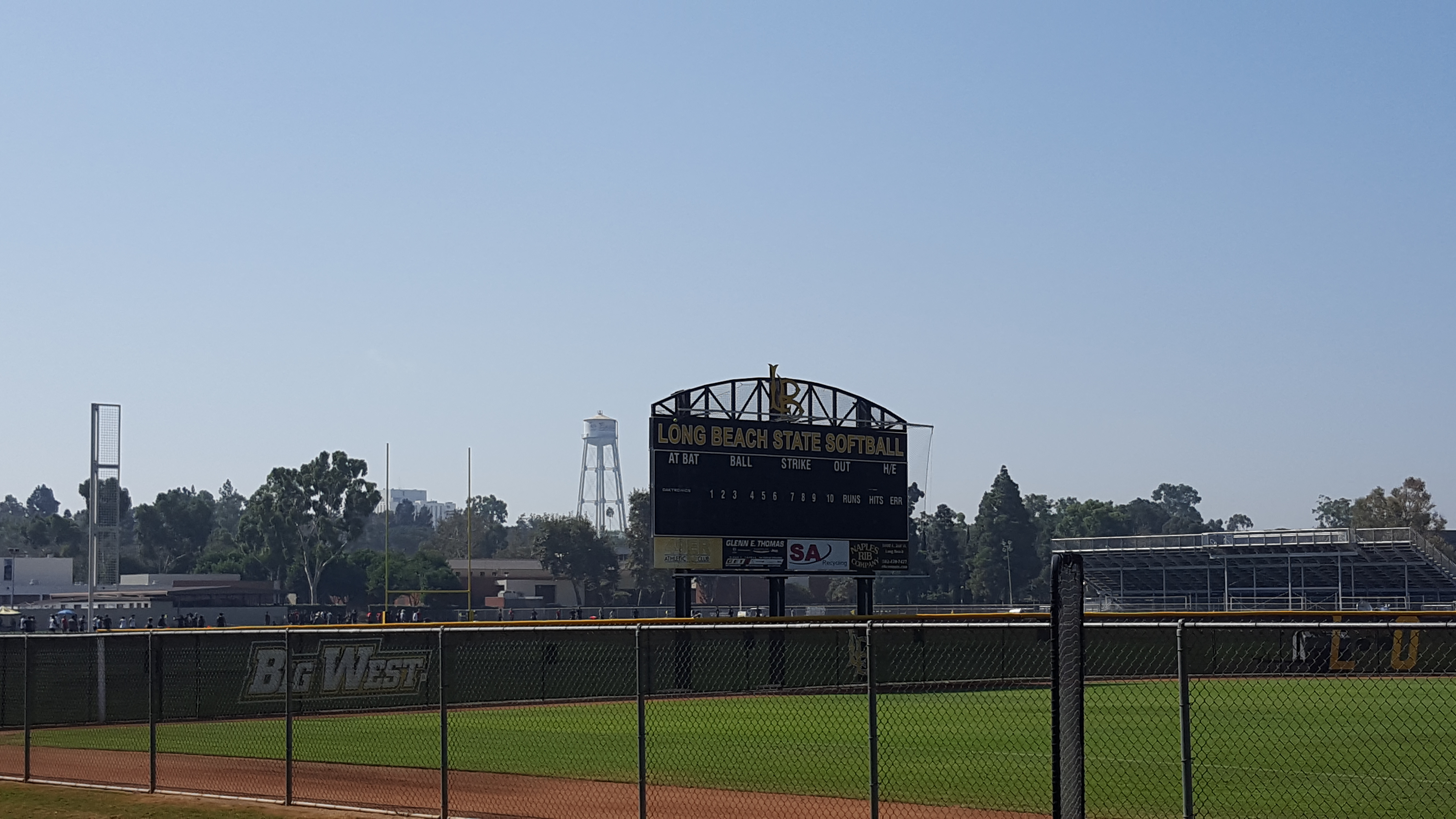
Softball complex

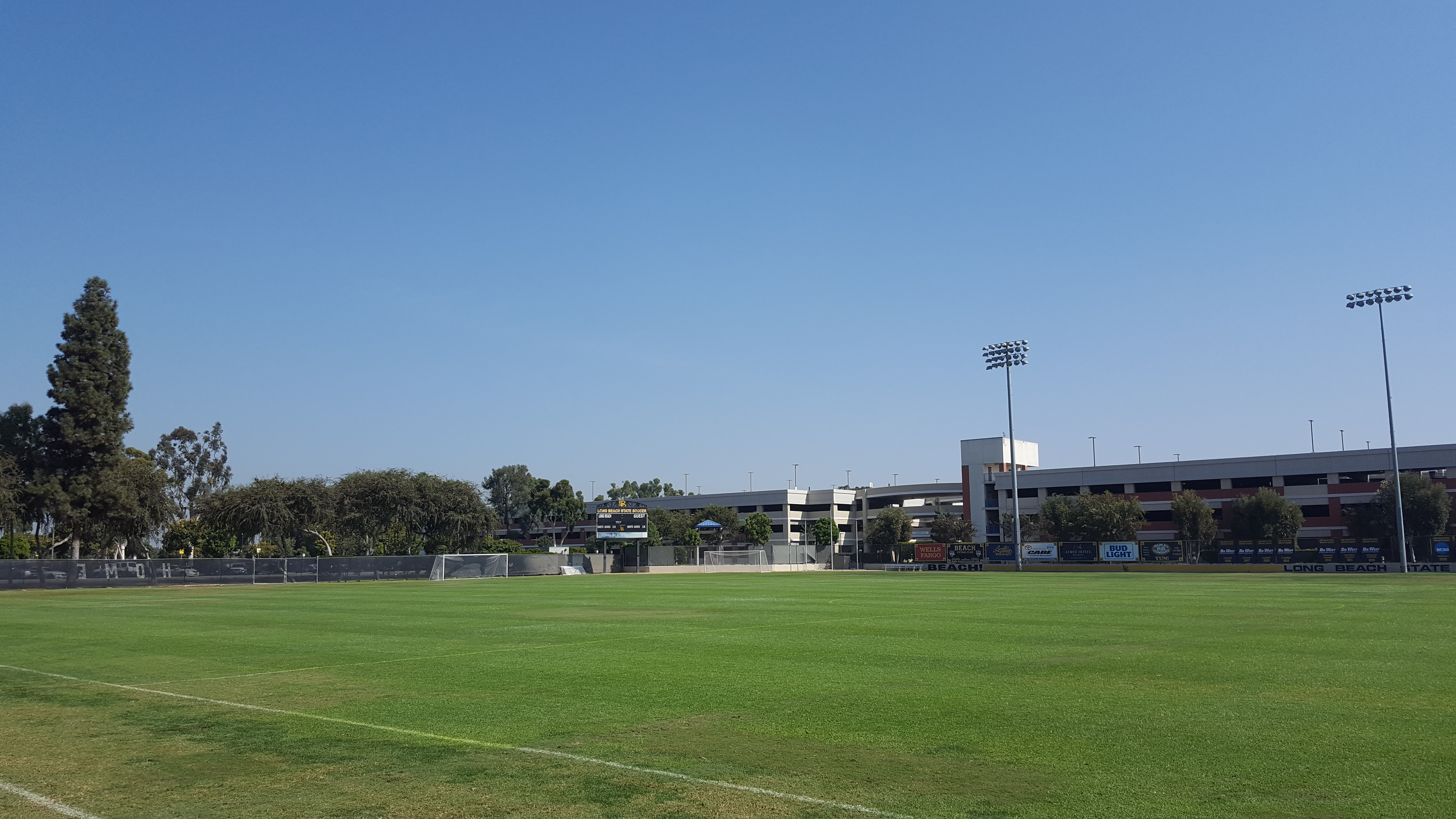
George Allen Field (soccer)

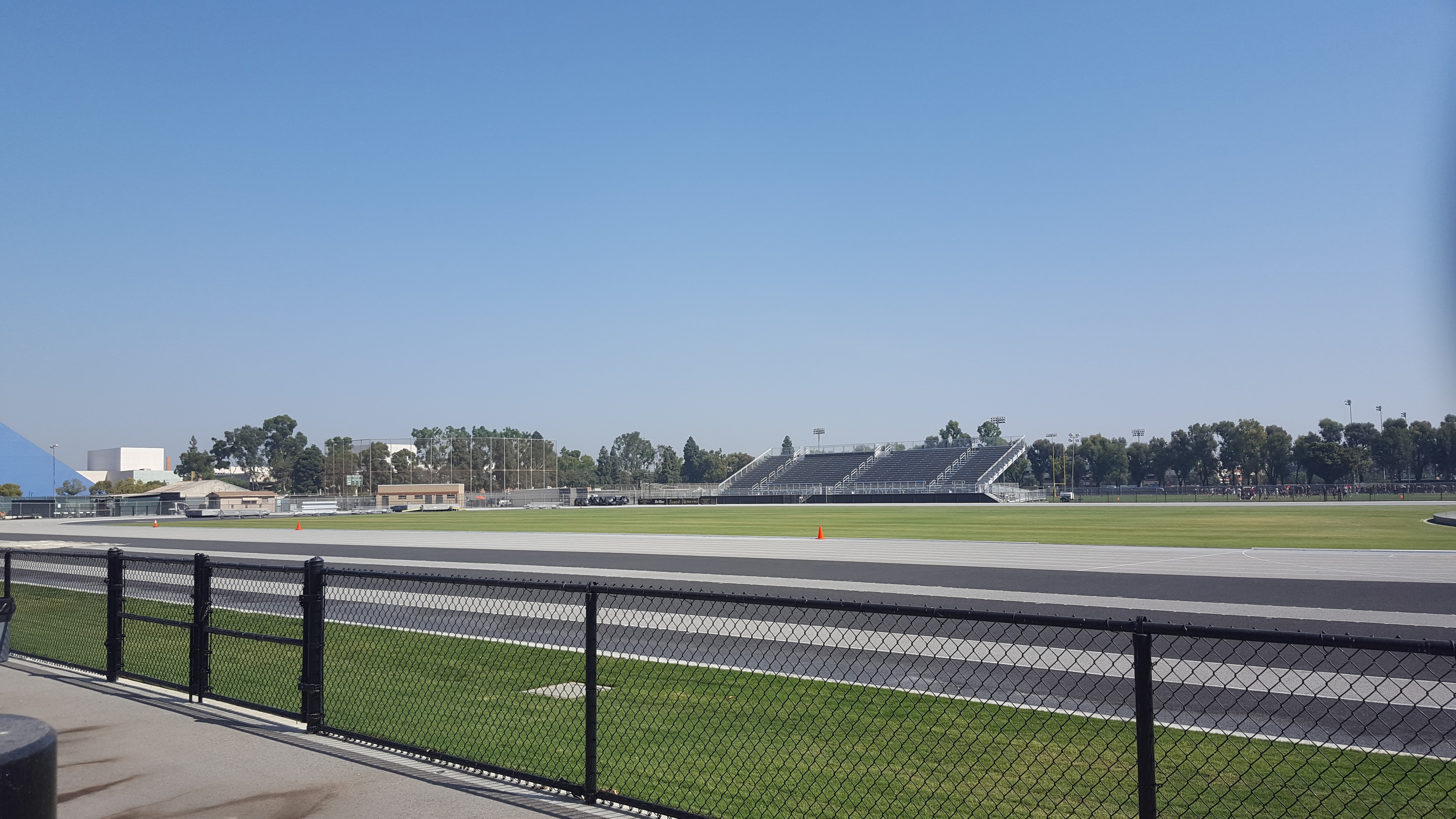
Jack Rose Track

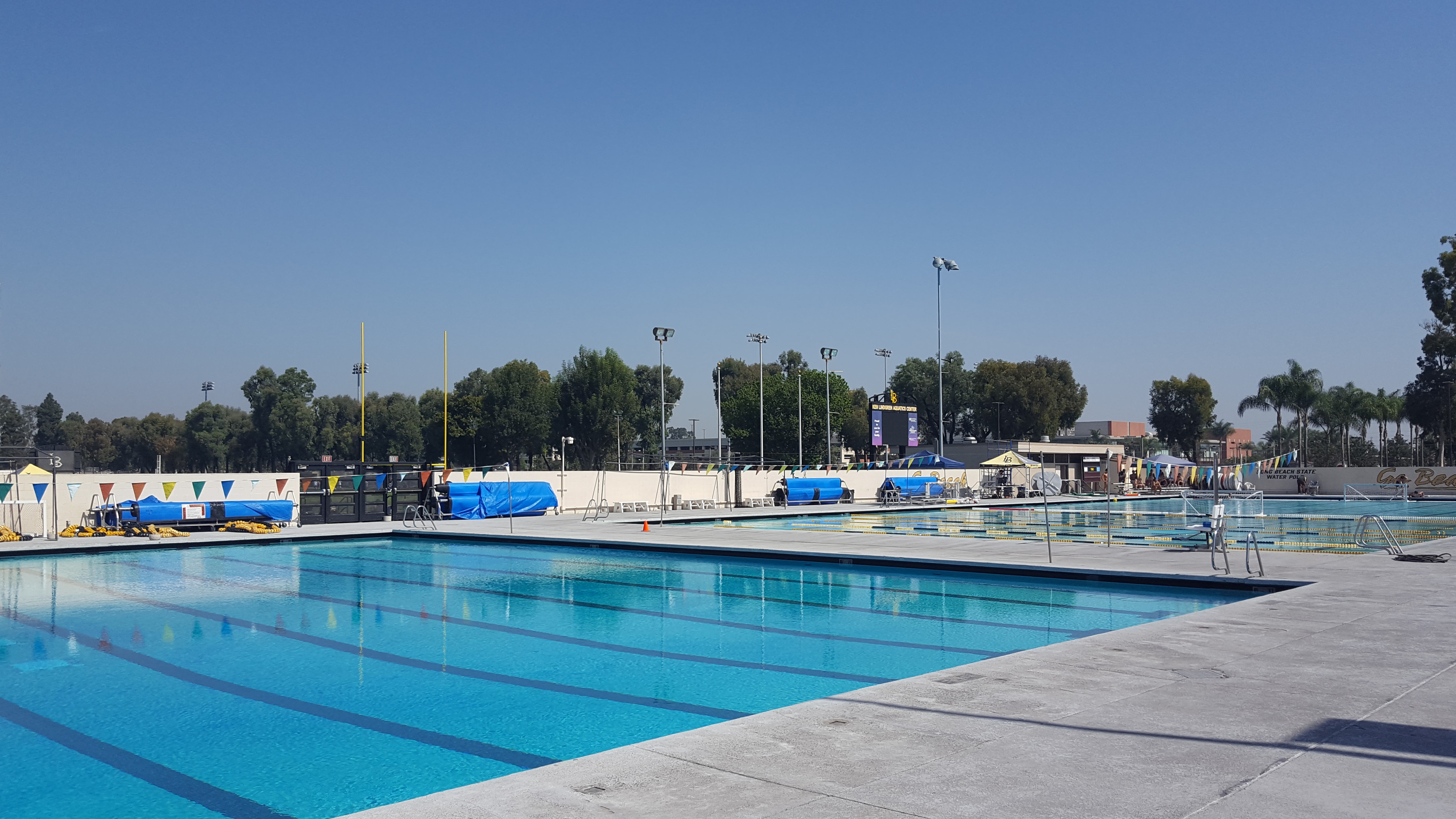
Ken Lindgren Aquatics Center

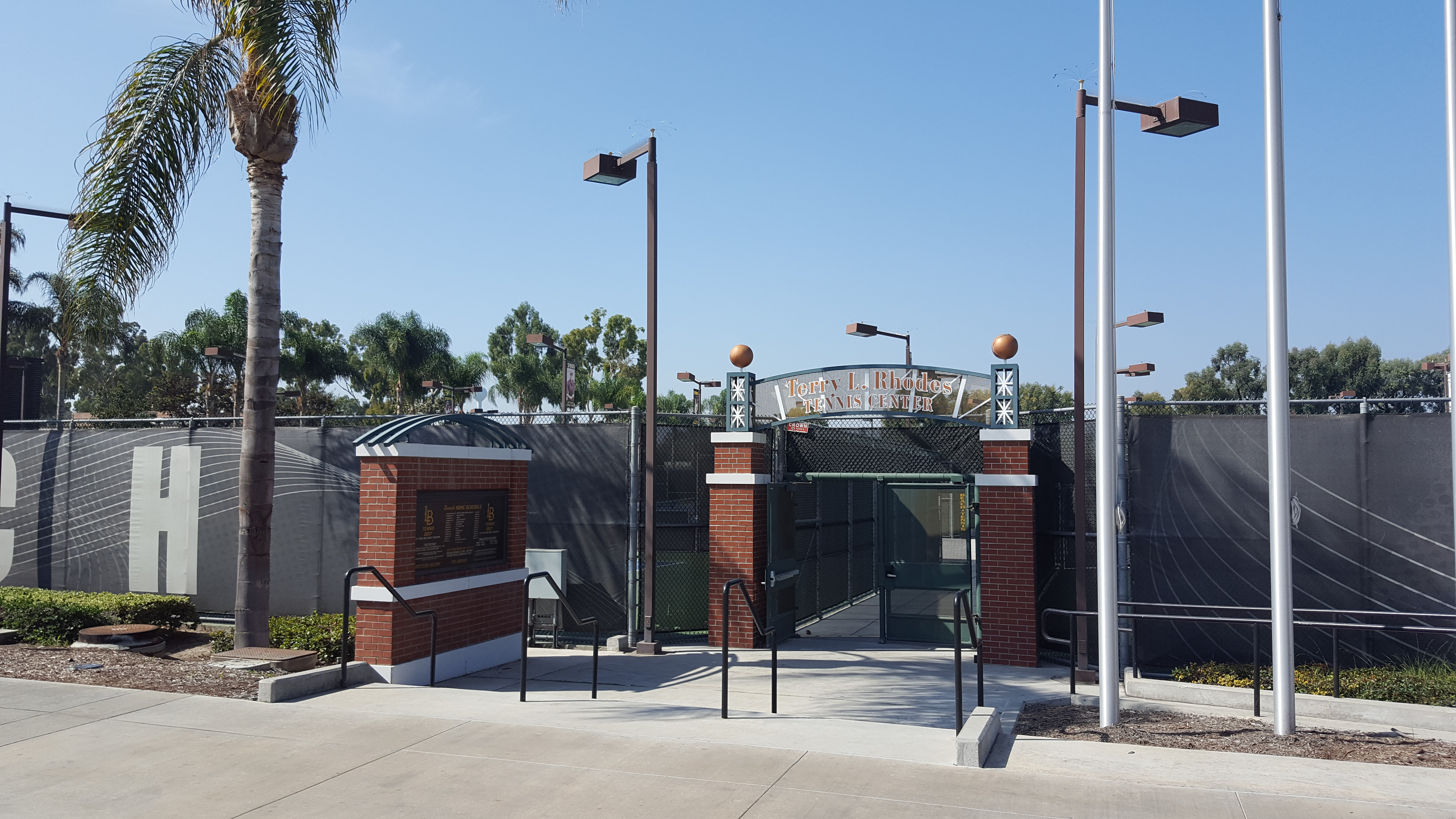
Rhodes Tennis Center

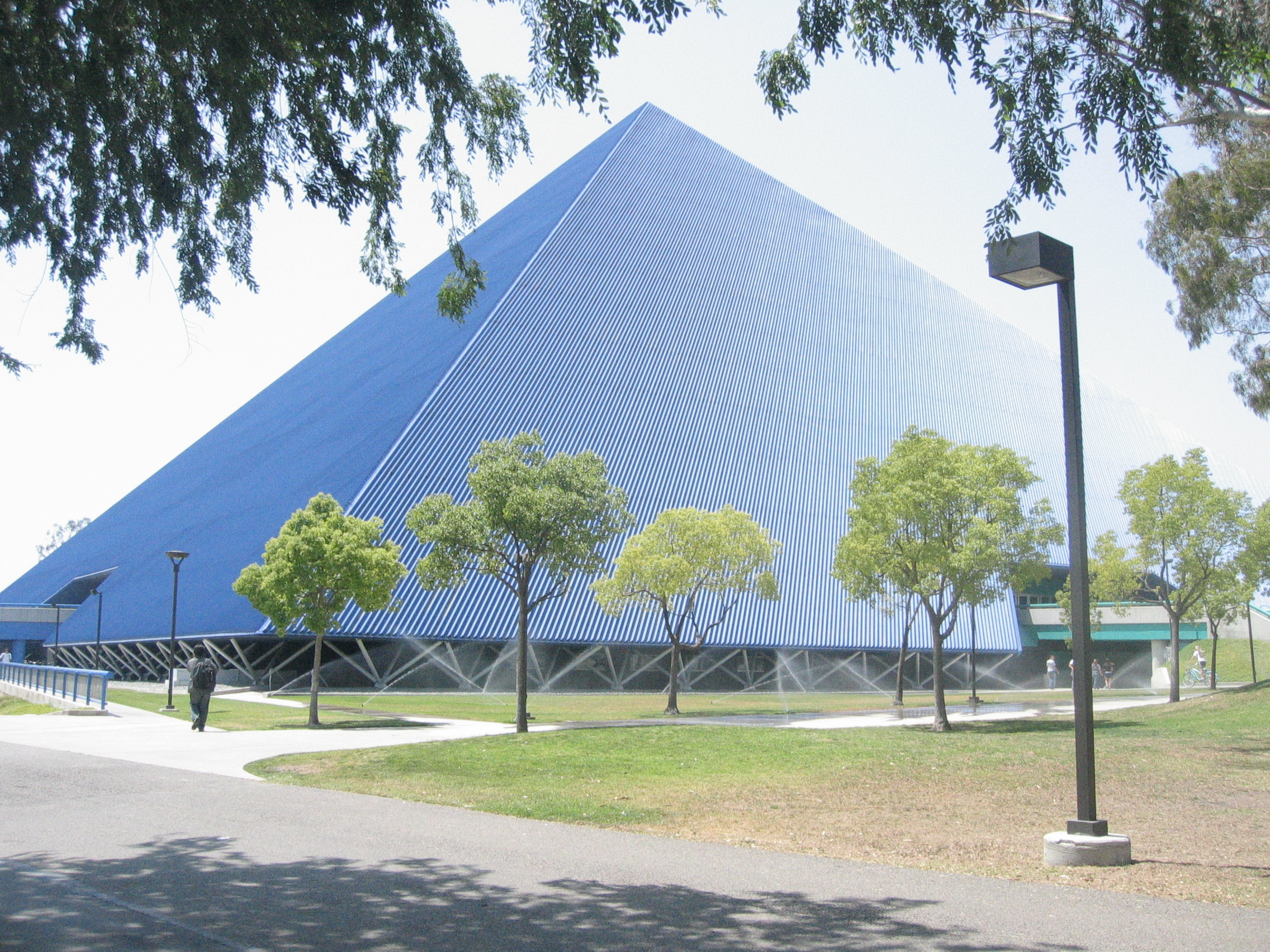
Walter Pyramid

== Championships ==
=== Appearances ===
The Long Beach State Beach competed in the NCAA tournament across 16 active sports (8 men's and 8 women's) 207 times at the Division I level.

- Baseball (21): 1970, 1989, 1991, 1992, 1993, 1994, 1995, 1996, 1997, 1998, 1999, 2001, 2002, 2003, 2004, 2005, 2007, 2008, 2014, 2016, 2017
- Men's basketball (10): 1970, 1971, 1972, 1973, 1977, 1993, 1995, 2007, 2012, 2024
- Women's basketball (12): 1982, 1983, 1984, 1985, 1986, 1987, 1988, 1989, 1990, 1991, 1992, 2017
- Beach volleyball (1): 2017
- Men's cross country (6): 1969, 1970, 1971, 1972, 1974, 1975
- Men's golf (5): 1971, 1972, 1973, 1974, 1982
- Women's soccer (7): 2008, 2010, 2011, 2012, 2015, 2016, 2018
- Softball (33): 1986, 1987, 1988, 1989, 1990, 1991, 1992, 1993, 1996, 1997, 1998, 1999, 2000, 2003, 2004, 2005, 2006, 2008, 2009, 2011, 2012, 2014, 2016, 2018
- Women's tennis (13): 2002, 2004, 2005, 2006, 2007, 2008, 2009, 2011, 2012, 2013, 2014, 2015, 2019
- Men's indoor track and field (11): 1965, 1972, 1976, 1977, 1981, 1997, 1998, 1999, 2007, 2009, 2017
- Women's indoor track and field (2): 1998, 2000
- Men's outdoor track and field (23): 1964, 1966, 1970, 1971, 1973, 1974, 1975, 1976, 1977, 1978, 1981, 1982, 1983, 1995, 1997, 1998, 1999, 2004, 2006, 2007, 2008, 2014, 2019
- Women's outdoor track and field (10): 1982, 1983, 1984, 1990, 1992, 1995, 2000, 2001, 2007, 2011
- Men's volleyball (15): 1970, 1973, 1990, 1991, 1999, 2004, 2008, 2016, 2017, 2018, 2019, 2022, 2023, 2024, 2025
- Women's volleyball (27): 1985, 1987, 1988, 1989, 1990, 1991, 1992, 1993, 1994, 1995, 1996, 1997, 1998, 1999, 2000, 2001, 2002, 2003, 2004, 2005, 2006, 2007, 2008, 2009, 2010, 2011, 2014
- Men's water polo (12): 1969, 1970, 1971, 1973, 1975, 1981, 1983, 1985, 1988, 1989, 1991, 2018

=== Team ===
The Beach of Long Beach State have earned 7 NCAA championships at the Division I level.

- Men's (4)
  - Volleyball (4): 1991, 2018, 2019, 2025
- Women's (3)
  - Volleyball (3): 1989, 1993, 1998

Results

School year	Sport	Opponent	Score
1989–90	Women's volleyball	Nebraska	3–0
1990–91	Men's volleyball	USC	3–1
1993–94	Women's volleyball	Penn State	3–1
1998–99	Women's volleyball	Penn State	3–2
2017–18	Men's volleyball	UCLA	3–2
2018–19	Men's volleyball	Hawai'i	3–1
2024–25	Men's volleyball	UCLA	3–0

Long Beach State won 3 national championships at the NCAA Division II level.

- Men's swimming and diving: 1968
- Men's tennis: 1967
- Men's outdoor track and field: 1967

Below are six national championships that were not bestowed by the NCAA.

- Women (6)
  - Badminton (2): 1970, 1974 (AIAW)
  - Field hockey (1): 1979 (AIAW)
  - Volleyball (2): 1972–73 season, 1973 (fall) (AIAW)
  - Beach volleyball (1): 2013 (AVCA)

Below are five national club team championships won at the highest collegiate level.

- Archery (recurve) (1): 2015 (mixed team)
- Roller hockey (1): 2011
- Sailing (2): 1966 match race, 1981 team race
- Surfing (1): 2001

=== Individual ===
Long Beach State had 16 athletes win NCAA individual championships at the Division I level.

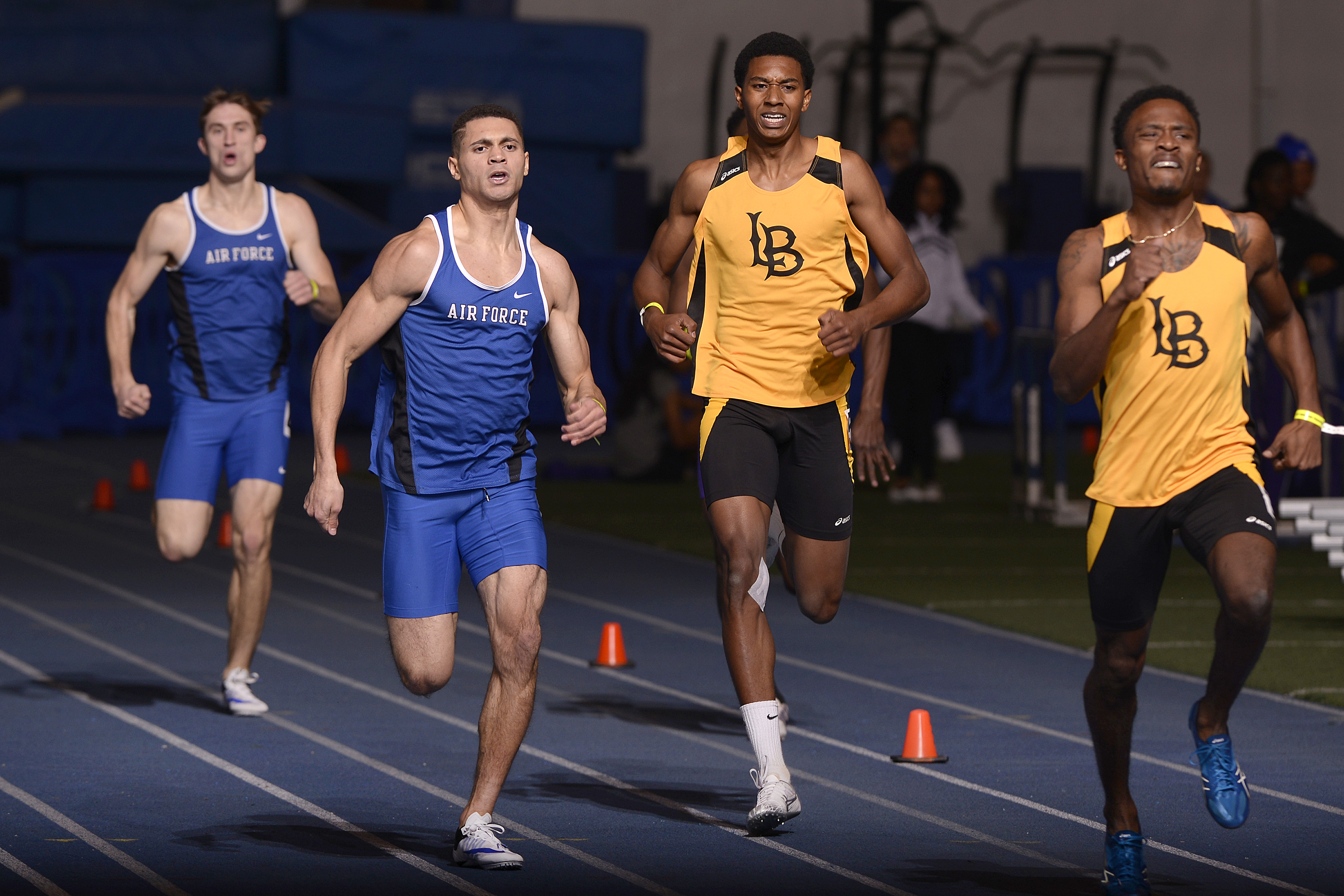
Long Beach v Air Force, track and field, 2017

NCAA individual championships
Order	School year	Athlete(s)	Sport	Source
1	1963–64	John Rambo	Men's outdoor track and field	
2	1968–69	Hans Fassnacht	Men's swimming and diving	
3	1968–69	Hans Fassnacht	Men's swimming and diving	
4	1969–70	Mitch Ivey	Men's swimming and diving	
5	1974–75	Keith Goldie	Men's outdoor track and field	
6	1974–75	Yoichi Tomita	Men's gymnastics	
7	1975–76	Tim Shaw	Men's swimming and diving	
8	1975–76	Tim Shaw	Men's swimming and diving	
9	1975–76	Dwight Stones	Men's indoor track and field	
10	1975–76	Dwight Stones	Men's outdoor track and field	
11	1976–77	Don Baird	Men's indoor track and field	
12	1976–77	Tim Shaw	Men's swimming and diving	
13	1977–78	Robert Jackson	Men's swimming and diving	
14	1977–78	Greg Jagenburg	Men's swimming and diving	
15	1977–78	Greg Jagenburg	Men's swimming and diving	
16	1996–97	Jason Hinkin	Men's indoor track and field	

At the NCAA Division II level, Long Beach State garnered 29 individual championships.

== National award winners ==
Corbett Award
Year	Name	Position
2007	Fred L. Miller	Athletic Director

== Traditions ==
=== Coaches ===
Long Beach has had a number of nationally prominent coaches in its history, including Tex Winter, Jerry Tarkanian and Lute Olson in men's basketball, George Allen in football, Alan Knipe in men's volleyball, Frances Schaafsma in women's volleyball and basketball, Joan Bonvicini in women's basketball, Anita Miller Huntsman in women’s field hockey, throwing coach Art Venegas in track and field, and Jon Urbanchek and Don Gambril in swimming.

=== Mascot ===
In spring 2018, the school's previous mascot, "Prospector Pete", was retired. On May 10, 2019, the school announced that its new mascot will be a shark, although there are no current plans for the school to be officially known as the "Sharks".

=== Olympics ===
Long Beach State has had an athlete participate in every Summer Olympic Games since the first Olympiad after the school's founding.

=== School colors ===
The school colors have been black and gold since 2000, when they were changed by a student referendum (after George Allen changed the football uniform colors) from the original brown and gold.

== Rivalries ==
Beach Athletics has several rival schools in the sports in which it competes. Besides being located in close proximity to each other, Long Beach State and the Cal State Fullerton Titans have competed heavily as conference rivals, particularly fueled by the history of success of their baseball programs. Since 2006, Long Beach State and the UC Irvine Anteaters have participated in the annual "Black and Blue Rivalry Series." In this challenge, each school earns points for its collective conference championships and head-to-head victories against each other (across all NCAA sports in which both schools participate). The totals are added up at the end of the season and a winner is declared. Finally, Long Beach State also has a long-standing "beach school" rivalry with the UC Santa Barbara Gauchos.
