= Mississippi Sports Hall of Fame =

Museum in Jackson, Mississippi

The Mississippi Sports Hall of Fame and Museum is located in Jackson, Mississippi. The hall of fame was established in 1961 and is currently located in a museum that displays the achievements of Mississippi athletes. The museum opened on July 4, 1996. It is opposite the Smith-Wills Stadium, former home of several minor-league baseball teams.

== Museum ==
Among the exhibits in the museum are the "Dizzy Dean Museum", the "Viking Classic Exhibit", which gives the history of Mississippi's PGA golf tournament (now known as the Sanderson Farms Championship, and the "Wendy's High School Gallery", which recognizes the Wendy's High School Heisman winners from Mississippi, as well as past and current state champions.

== Hall of fame procedures ==
- Selection guidelines: See footnote
- Eligibility requirements: See footnote

== Inductees ==
For list of inductees by sport, see footnote For list of inductees by year, see footnote For alphabetical list of inductees, see footnote

=== A–J ===
A

- Billy Ray Adams, 1987
- Warner Alford, 2003, football player, coach, and athletic director
- Pop Allen, 1994, multi-sport athlete, coach and athletic director
- Lance Alworth, 1988
- Charles Armstrong, 1976
- Henry Armstrong, 2010
- Bonner Arnold, 1978, basketball player and coach
- Jim Ashmore, 1983

B

- Johnny Baker, 1984
- Lee Baker, 2004
- Coolidge Ball, 2008
- Red Barber, 2024
- Calvin Barbour, 1975
- Lem Barney, 1986
- Doby Bartling, 1977
- J.E Baxter, 1969, college football and basketball player, high school coach, World War II veteran, and state legislator
- James "Cool Papa" Bell, 1995
- Mickey Bellande, 1974
- Scott Berry, 2025
- Verlon Marion Biggs, 2002
- J.T. "Blondy" Black, 1976
- Ricky Black, 2019
- Thermon Blacklidge, 1971
- Bernard Blackwell, 2001
- Courtney Blades-Rogers, 2012
- Felix "Doc" Blanchard, 1994
- Don Blasingame, 1980
- Ruthie Bolton, 2014
- Ralph Boston, 1976
- Maggie Bowen, 2022
- Jeff Bower, 2009
- Denver Brackeen, 1982, basketball player, coach, military officer, and administrator
- Robert Braddy, 2017
- Leon Bramlett, 1988
- Cowboy Brantley, 2011
- Robert Brazile, 2007
- Billy Brewer, 2018
- Johnny Brewer, 2004
- Sean Brewer, 2016
- Bobby Brien, 1985, tennis player
- Debbie Brock, 2021
- Allen Brown, 2010
- Pete Brown, 2020
- Ray Brown, 2006
- Willie Brown, 1995
- Jackson Brumfield, 2001, football player, coach, served in U.S. Army
- Bill Buckner, 2013
- Ju Burghard, 1970, three-sport college athlete and sports official / referee
- Ode Burrell, 1997
- Guy Bush, 1973

C

- Lindy Callahan, 2004
- Buck Cameron, 1987, college track, football, and boxer, high school basketball and track coach
- Mack Cameron, 1999
- Jack Carlisle, 2004
- Jim Carmody, 2009
- James Ray Carpenter, 2003
- Marino Casem, 1994
- Gene Chadwick, 1973
- William "Billy" Chadwick, 2005
- Van Chancellor, 2005
- Lloyd Clark, 2006
- Will Clark, 2008
- Robert "Ace" Cleveland, 1998
- Rick Cleveland, 2017
- Leroy Braxton "Roy" Cochran, 1997
- Bob Coleman, 2010
- Reggie Collier, 2008
- Bobby Collins, 2000
- Glen Collins, 2026
- Charlie Conerly, 1966
- Eugenia Conner, 2017
- Hamp Cook, 1996, football player, coach, and scout
- Johnie Cooks, 2004
- Hunter Corhern, 1989
- Paul Covington, 2008
- Harry Craft, 1975
- A.G. Crawford, 1972
- Eddie Crawford, 2012
- Bobby Crespino, 1994
- Jack Cristil, 1991
- Hugh Critz, 1963
- Doug Cunningham, 2014

D

- Roland Dale, 1995
- Erick Dampier, 2021
- Jim Davenport, 1983
- Wobble Davidson, 1986
- Art Davis, 1981
- Harper Davis, 1980
- Kermit Davis, 2022
- Eagle Day, 1981
- Dizzy Dean, 1990
- David Dellucci, 2022
- Mike Dennis, 2015
- Hill Denson, 2008, baseball player and coach
- Hanford Dixon, 2005
- Kayo Dottley, 1971
- Frank Dowsing, 2010
- Richard Duease, 2024
- Jim Dunaway, 1990
- Marcus Dupree, 2017

E

- Rita Easterling, 2011
- Hal Easterwood, 2005
- Jim Edwards, 1966
- Paul Elias, 2024
- T.B. Ellis, 2002
- Doug Elmore, 1993
- Buddy Elrod, 1975

F

- Jess Fatheree, 1964
- Brett Favre, 2015
- Rockey Felker, 2019
- Nollie Felts, 1967
- Dave "Boo" Ferriss, 1964
- Agnes Fitz-Hugh, 1975
- Charlie Flowers, 1985
- Lee Floyd, 1991
- Joe Fortunato, 1978
- Bill Foster, 2003
- Bobby Franklin, 2005
- Leslie Frazier, 2017
- Steve Freeman, 2025
- Doss Fulton, 1986

G

- Tranny Gaddy, 1965
- Jim Gallagher Jr., 2022
- Mary Gallagher, 2019
- K. P. Gatchell, 1966
- Smylie Gebhart, 1985
- Joe Gibbon, 1979
- Jake Gibbs, 1976
- Kline Gilbert, 1977
- Jimmie Giles, 2013
- Jennifer Gillom, 2008
- Peggie Gillom, 1998
- Gerald Glass, 2013
- Tom Goode, 1990
- Bill Goodrich, 2005
- W. C. Gorden, 1997
- Country Graham, 1963
- Larry Grantham, 1980
- Mildrette Netter Graves, 2003
- Hugh Green, 2009
- Reed Green, 1966
- L. C. Greenwood, 1996
- Jack Gregory, 2000
- Paul Gregory, 1982
- Wilburn Glynn Griffing, 2002
- Sue Gunter, 2003
- Louis Guy, 2026
- Ray Guy, 1994

H

- Michael Haddix, 2026
- Goat Hale, 1961
- Bobby Halford, 2026
- Parker Hall, 1970
- Sam Hall, 2012
- Slats Hardin, 1991
- Earnest Harrington, 2013
- Lusia Harris-Stewart, 1990
- Lou Hart, 2007
- Bob Hartley, 1994
- Willie Heidelburg, 2016
- Marion L. Henley, 1993
- Carolyn Henry, 2002
- Jeff Herrod, 2023
- W.E. "Slew" Hester, 1968
- Gene Hickerson, 1979
- Stan Hindman, 1988
- Dick Hitt, 1965
- Joel Hitt, 1972
- Dobie Holden, 1970
- Junie Hovious, 1967
- Bailey Howell, 1977
- Kent Hull, 2003
- Lindsey Hunter, 2021
- Doug Hutton, 1995

I

- Joe S. Iupe, Jr., 2005

J

- Anna Jackson, 2018
- Harold Jackson, 1989
- Kay James, 2016
- Bert Jenkins, 1999
- M.C. Johnson, 1978
- Samye Johnson, 2002
- Mike Jones, 2018
- Orsmond Jordan, Jr., 2001
- Mike Justice, 2025

=== K–Z ===
K

- Doug Kenna, Jr., 1970
- Don Kessinger, 1984
- Tyrone Keys, 2009
- Eddie Khayat, 2004
- Robert Khayat, 2000
- Bruiser Kinard, 1961
- Mike Kinnison, 2011
- Steve Knight, 2015
- Ike Knox, Jr., 1964
- Sylvia Howell Krebs, 1996

L

- Wendell Ladner, 1988
- A.C. "Butch" Lambert, Sr., 2000
- Jimmy Lear, 1991
- Hal Lee, 1974
- Earl Leggett, 2002
- Sam Leslie, 1968
- D.D. Lewis, 1987
- Ken Lindsay, 2001
- Freddie Little, 1995
- James Harol Lofton, 1999
- Carla Lowry, 1985
- Barry Lyons, 2022

M

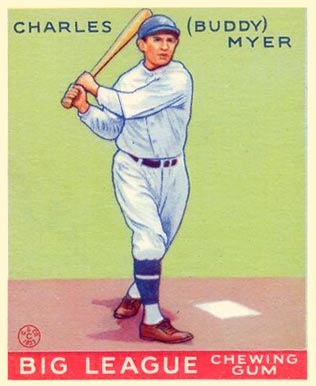
All Star Buddy Myer

- Carl Maddox, 1989
- Jeffrey Malone, 2012
- Con Maloney, 2011
- Archie Manning, 1989
- Eli Manning, 2024
- Ronnie Mayers, 2026
- Fred McAfee, 2015
- Deuce McAllister, 2014
- Babe McCarthy, 1974
- Dexter McCluster, 2025
- Jimmie McDowell, 1999
- Bucky McElroy, 1981
- David McIntosh, 1973
- Allyn McKeen, 1977
- Eric McNair, 1963
- Steve McNair, 2014
- Shorty McWilliams, 1963
- Eddie Merrins, 2000
- Terrence Metcalf, 2021
- Abe Mickal, 1985
- Cary Middlecoff, 1996
- Mary Mills, 1987
- Crawford Mims, 1995
- Willie Mitchell, 1966
- Bilbo Monaghan, 1996
- John Montgomery, 1974
- Wilbert Montgomery, 2019
- Bucky Moore, 1965
- Robert Morgan, 2009
- George Morris, 1983
- Eric Moulds, 2022
- Dot Easterwood Murphy, 1999
- Buddy Myer, 1971
- Larry Myricks, 2001

N

- Thomas Neville, Jr., 1984
- Derrick Nix, 2025
- Jack Nix, 1988
- Dudy Noble, 1961

O

- Roy Oswalt, 2019
- Don Owens, 2004

P

- Rafael Palmeiro, 2012
- Corky Palmer, 2011
- Jackie Parker, 1972
- Johnny Parker, 2026
- Claude Passeau, 1964
- Jimmy Patton, 1972
- Walter Payton, 1993
- Hugh Pepper, 1977
- Ray Perkins, 1998
- Bubba Phillips (John Melvin Phillips), 1972
- George Pillow, 1983
- Ron Polk, 1998
- Barney Poole, 1965
- J.E. "Buster" Poole, 1964
- Ray Poole, 1968
- Johnny Pott, 1993
- Jay Powell, 2017
- Richard Price, 2019
- Ennis Proctor, 2012
- Vic Purvis, 2006

R

- Dave Randall, 2021
- Walter Reed, 1999
- Anton Reel, 2006
- Andy Reese, 1969
- Brittney Reese, 2026
- Joe Renfroe, 1982
- Nick Revon, 1985
- Jerry Rice, 2007
- Willie Richardson, 1979
- Troy Ricks, 2007
- Steve Rives, 2025
- Stanley Robinson, 1961
- Langston Rogers, 2013
- John Rubenstein, 2013
- Charles Rugg, 2005

S

- Lester Sack, 1991
- Billy Sam, 1965
- Tom Sawyer, 1992
- Donald Scott, 1963
- George "Boomer" Scott, 2007
- George Sekul, 2002
- Billy Shaw, 1996
- Jackie Sherrill, 2016
- Purvis Short, 1999
- Jackie Slater, 2003
- Calvin Smith, 2014
- Jimmy Smith, 2024
- Larry Smith, 2016
- Ralph "Catfish" Smith, 2002
- Riley Smith, 1984
- Tad Smith, 1969
- Leroy "L.T." Smith, 1998
- Lake Speed, 2010
- William Spencer, 1968
- Jack Spinks, 1984
- Billy Stacy, 1979
- Bob Stevens, 2003
- Savanté Stringfellow, 2024
- Hook Stone, 1967
- Lafayette Stribling, 2018
- John Stroud, 2009
- Red Stroud, 1990
- Clyde Stuart, 1968
- Scott Suber, 1993
- Walter Suggs, 2006
- Walter "Polie" Sullivan, 1973
- Bull Sullivan, 1984
- Tom Swayze, 1978

T

- Michael D. "Mike" Taylor, 1997
- Pete Taylor, 1990
- Marvin Terrell, 2001
- Chuck Thomas, 1975
- Lewis Tillman, 2023
- Kenneth Toler, 2010
- Willie Totten, 2004
- M. K. Turk, 2005
- Bob Tyler, 2022

U

- P. W. "Bear" Underwood, 1986
- Delbert Bernard "Del" Unser, 1997

V

- B.O. Van Hook, 1981
- Thad Vann, 1971
- Johnny Vaught, 1976
- Becky Vest, 2024
- Dorothy Vest, 1980
- Sam Vick, 1967

W

- Lily Wade, 1974
- Gerald "Gee" Walker, 1969
- Joe Walker, 2018
- Wesley Walls, 2016
- Carl Walters, Sr., 1993
- Fred Walters, 1971
- Charlie Ward, 1979
- Thomas "Randy" Watkins, 2021
- Jimmy Webb, 2024
- Robbie Webb, 2025
- Skeeter Webb, 1978
- Hunter G. Weddington, 1983
- Clarence Weatherspoon, 2015
- Paul Wells, 1970
- Gwen White, 2015
- Willye White, 1981
- Dave Whitney, Sr., 1991
- "Gentle" Ben Williams, 1997
- Mo Williams, 2025
- Richard Williams, 2014
- Jerrel Wilson, 2011
- Pat Wilson, 1969
- Spec Wilson, 1967
- Sammy Winder, 1998
- James Wright, 2022
- Archie Wright-Moore, 2018
