= Long Beach State Beach women's basketball =

Long Beach State Beach
2026–27 Long Beach State Beach women's basketball team
- University: California State University, Long Beach
- Head coach: Minyon Moore (1st season)
- Location: Long Beach, California
- Arena: LBS Financial Credit Union Pyramid (capacity: 5,000)
- Conference: Big West
- Nickname: Beach
- Colors: Black and gold

NCAA Division I tournament Final Four
- 1987, 1988
Other NCAA Division I tournament results
Elite Eight	1983, 1985, 1987, 1988, 1989
Sweet Sixteen	1982, 1983, 1985, 1986, 1987, 1988, 1989, 1991
Appearances	1972, 1973, 1976, 1979, 1980, 1981, 1982, 1983, 1984, 1985, 1986, 1987, 1988, 1989, 1990, 1991, 1992, 2017

AIAW tournament quarterfinals
- 1980, 1981
Other AIAW tournament results
Appearances	1972, 1973, 1976, 1979, 1980, 1981

Conference tournament champions
- 1987, 1988, 1989, 1991, 2017

Conference regular-season champions
- 1966, 1967, 1968, 1969, 1970, 1971, 1972, 1973, 1974, 1975, 1976, 1980, 1981, 1982, 1984, 1985, 1986, 1987, 1988, 1989, 1991

Uniforms
Home	Away

The Long Beach State Beach women's basketball team represents California State University, Long Beach in Long Beach, California. The school's team currently competes in the Big West Conference.

== History ==
Since beginning in 1962, the 49ers have an all-time record (as of the end of the 2015–16 season) of 898–521. They played in the Southern California Women’s Intercollegiate Athletic Conference from 1962 to 1965, the Extramural Coordinating Council of Southern California Colleges from 1965 to 1971, and the SCWIAC from 1971 to 1976 before joining the Western Collegiate Athletic Association in 1976, playing until 1985.

They played in the AIAW women's basketball tournament (the predecessor to the NCAA Tournament) in 1972, 1973, 1976, 1979, 1980, and 1981. They were champion of the Western Collegiate Athletic Association for 1982–1985. They won the Pacific Coast Athletic Association (now known as the Big West Conference) title from 1987–89. The 49ers made the Final Four in 1987 and 1988. In 1987 (a year where they went 33–3), they beat Washington 72–57, Ole Miss 94–55 and Ohio State 102–82 to win the West Region. In the National Semifinal versus Tennessee, they lost 74–64. In 1988 (a year where they went 28–6), the 49ers beat Colorado 103–64, Washington 104–78, and Iowa 98–78 to win the West Region again. In the National Semifinal versus Auburn, they were beaten 68–55. Though they haven't reached an NCAA Tournament since 1992, they have played in the WNIT in 2000, 2013, 2015, 2016.

== Year-by-year records ==
Season	Record	Conference record	Coach
1962–63	4–0	n/a	Frances Schaafsma
1963–64	7–0	n/a	Frances Schaafsma
1964–65	7–0	n/a	Frances Schaafsma
1965–66	8–2	6–2 (T-1st)	Frances Schaafsma
1966–67	8–4	6–2 (T-1st)	Frances Schaafsma
1967–68	13–2	10–1 (T-1st)	Frances Schaafsma
1968–69	10–3	8–2 (1st)	Frances Schaafsma
1969–70	13–2	10–0 (1st)	Frances Schaafsma
1970–71	9–5	4–1 (1st)	Frances Schaafsma
1971–72	13–6	6–0 (1st)	Frances Schaafsma
1972–73	13–5	6–0 (1st)	Frances Schaafsma
1973–74	13–5	8–0 (1st)	Frances Schaafsma
1974–75	16–5	9–1 (1st)	Frances Schaafsma
1975–76	18–7	9–4 (1st)	Frances Schaafsma
1976–77	14–10	5–3 (3rd)	Frances Schaafsma
1977–78	18–9	4–4 (3rd)	Frances Schaafsma
1978–79	24–8	6–2 (2nd)	Frances Schaafsma
1979–80	28–6	12–0 (1st)	Joan Bonvicini
1980–81	27–7	10–2 (1st)	Joan Bonvicini
1981–82	24–6	11–1 (1st)	Joan Bonvicini
1982–83	24–7	12–2 (2nd)	Joan Bonvicini
1983–84	25–6	13–1 (T-1st)	Joan Bonvicini
1984–85	28–3	13–1 (1st)	Joan Bonvicini
1985–86	29–5	14–0 (1st)	Joan Bonvicini
1986–87	33–3	17–1 (1st)	Joan Bonvicini
1987–88	28–6	18–0 (1st)	Joan Bonvicini
1988–89	30–5	18–0 (1st)	Joan Bonvicini
1989–90	25–9	14–4 (3rd)	Joan Bonvicini
1990–91	24–8	15–3 (T-1st)	Joan Bonvicini
1991–92	21–10	13–5 (2nd)	Glenn McDonald
1992–93	9–17	8–10 (6th	Glenn McDonald
1993–94	11–17	9–9 (7th)	Glenn McDonald
1994–95	13–14	10–8 (T-5th)	Glenn McDonald
1995–96	15–13	10–8 (T-5th)	Dallas Bolla
1996–97	11–17	7–8 (4th)	Dallas Bolla
1997–98	7–19	4–11 (5th)	Dallas Bolla
1998–99	18–11	10–5 (2nd)	Dallas Bolla
1999-00	22–11	12–3 (2nd)	Dallas Bolla
2000–01	17–13	10–4 (2nd)	Dallas Bolla
2001–02	16–13	11–5 (4th)	Dallas Bolla
2002–03	14–15	10–6 (3rd)	Dallas Bolla
2003–04	14–16	8–10 (5th)	Mary Hegarty
2004–05	19–9	13–5 (2nd)	Mary Hegarty
2005–06	18–10	10–4 (T-1st)	Mary Hegarty
2006–07	9–23	4–10 (T-6th)	Mary Hegarty
2007–08	9–20	7–9 (7th)	Mary Hegarty
2008–09	8–21	4–12 (T-7th)	Mary Hegarty
2009–10	13–17	9–7 (T-4th)	Jody Wynn
2010–11	8–23	6–10 (6th)	Jody Wynn
2011–12	14–18	7–9 (7th)	Jody Wynn
2012–13	16–16	9–9 (5th)	Jody Wynn
2013–14	17–15	8–8 (T-6th)	Jody Wynn
2014–15	22–10	9–7 (4th)	Jody Wynn
2015–16	24–9	12–4 (T2nd)	Jody Wynn
2016–17	23–11	12–4 (T2nd)	Jody Wynn
2017–18	8–23	6–10 (7th)	Jeff Cammon
2018–19	9–22	5–11 (7th)	Jeff Cammon
2019–20	13–17	8–8 (5th)	Jeff Cammon
2020–21	12–9	11–7 (3rd)	Jeff Cammon
2021–22	19–9	12–6 (3rd)	Jeff Cammon
2022–23	23–10	17–3 (2nd)	Jeff Cammon
2023–24	15–18	8–12 (8th)	Amy Wright
2024–25	16–14	12–8 (6th)	Amy Wright
2025–26	5-25	4-16 (9th)	Amy Wright
2026–27	0-0	0-0	Minyon Moore

== Postseason results ==
=== NCAA Division I ===
Long Beach State has appeared in a dozen NCAA tournaments, with a record of 18-12.

Year	Seed	Round	Opponent	Result
1982	#1	First Round; Sweet Sixteen	#8 Howard #4 Drake	W 95−57; L 78–91
1983	#2	First Round; Sweet Sixteen; Elite Eight	#7 Stephen F. Austin #3 Oregon State #1 Southern Cal	W 88−61; W 92–72; L 74–81
1984	#2	First Round; Sweet Sixteen; Elite Eight	#7 UNLV #6 San Diego State #1 Southern Cal	W 78−58; W 91–73; L 74–90
1985	#1	First Round; Sweet Sixteen; Elite Eight	#8 BYU #4 Southern Cal #2 Georgia	W 112−85; W 75–72; L 82–97
1986	#3	Second Round; Sweet Sixteen	#6 Texas Tech #2 Louisiana Tech	W 78−73 (OT); L 69–71
1987	#1	Second Round; Sweet Sixteen; Elite Eight; Final Four	#8 Washington #4 Ole Miss #2 Ohio State #2 Tennessee	W 72−57; W 94–55; W 102–82; L 64–74
1988	#2	Second Round; Sweet Sixteen; Elite Eight; Final Four	#7 Colorado #3 Washington #1 Iowa #1 Auburn	W 103−64; W 104–78; W 98–78; L 55–68
1989	#2	Second Round; Sweet Sixteen; Elite Eight	#10 St. Joseph's #3 Ohio State #1 Tennessee	W 84−65; W 89–83; L 80–94
1990	#6	First Round; Second Round	#11 California #3 Stephen F. Austin	W 87−84; L 62–78
1991	#4	Second Round; Sweet Sixteen	#5 Southern Cal #1 Georgia	W 83−58; L 77–87
1992	#10	First Round	#7 Creighton	L 66–79
2017	#15	First Round	#2 Oregon State	L 55–56

=== AIAW Division I ===
The Beach, then known as the 49ers, made six appearances in the AIAW National Division I basketball tournament, with a combined record of 6–9.

Year	Round	Opponent	Result
1972	First Round; Consolation first round Consolation second round Consolation third round	Tennessee–Martin; Illinois State; Southern Connecticut; Queens (NY)	L, 52–56; W, 49–43; W, 47–46; W, 69–57
1973	First Round; Consolation first round	Mercer; Kansas State	L, 46–55; L, 43–49
1976	First Round; Consolation first round Consolation second round	Immaculata; Portland State; Mississippi College	L, 65–84; W, 74–54; L, 81–95
1979	First Round; Consolation round	Fordham; Rutgers	L, 52–62; L, 84–96
1980	Second Round; Quarterfinals	NC State; Louisiana Tech	W, 82–72; L, 70–96
1981	Second Round; Quarterfinals	Rutgers; Old Dominion	W, 77–73; L, 60–76
