= List of Mississippi College Choctaws in the NFL draft =

This is a list of Mississippi College Choctaws football players in the NFL draft.

== Key ==
B	Back	K	Kicker	NT	Nose tackle
C	Center	LB	Linebacker	FB	Fullback
DB	Defensive back	P	Punter	HB	Halfback
DE	Defensive end	QB	Quarterback	WR	Wide receiver
DT	Defensive tackle	RB	Running back	G	Guard
E	End	T	Offensive tackle	TE	Tight end

= Pro Bowler
= Hall of Famer

== Selections ==
Year	Round	Pick	Overall	Player	Team	Position
1939	13	3	113	Joel Hitt	Cleveland Rams	E
1941	12	3	103	Charlie Armstrong	Chicago Cardinals	B
1976	14	15	390	Larry Evans	Denver Broncos	LB
1983	4	5	89	Michael Williams	Philadelphia Eagles	RB
1983	7	11	179	Daryl Posey	Kansas City Chiefs	RB
1985	11	16	296	Harold Stanfield	Cincinnati Bengals	TE
1991	6	15	154	Fred McAfee	New Orleans Saints	RB
