= Point after =

Point after or Point After may refer to:

- Conversion (gridiron football), a gridiron football play worth one point that occurs immediately after a touchdown
- Point After, a former TV program on the NFL Network
