= Charles Armstrong (baseball) =

American baseball player and coach (1914–1990)

Biographical details
- Born: December 13, 1914; Bogalusa, Louisiana
- Died: January 27, 1990 (aged 75); Meridian, Mississippi, U.S.

Coaching career (HC unless noted)

Baseball
- 1938–1939: Mississippi State football

Charles (Pee Wee) Armstrong (December 13, 1914 – January 27, 1990) was an American professional baseball player and coach.

== Early life ==
Armstrong was born in Bogalusa, Louisiana and raised in Jackson, Mississippi. He attended Central High School in Jackson before attending Mississippi State University from 1934 to 1937, where he lettered in football, baseball and basketball (1934–36). He was All-SEC in 1935 and named Best Athlete in 1937.

== Professional career ==
Armstrong played professional baseball with the Jackson Senators in 1937–38 where he played catcher to future Boston Redsox pitcher and MLB Hall of Famer, Dave "Boo" Ferriss. He coached Mississippi State football in 1938 and was a coach and Athletics Director at Belzoni High School in 1939–40. Armstrong was also a Southeastern Conference football and basketball official in the 1950s and 1960s, and later officiated football and basketball at the junior college level before retiring. He was a lifelong resident of Meridian, Mississippi.

Armstrong is most famous for the 65-yard winning pass he threw to Fred Walters when Mississippi State beat undefeated national powerhouse Army in West Point, New York (13–7) in 1935. Armstrong was inducted into the Mississippi State University Sports Hall of Fame in 1972. In 1976, Armstrong was inducted into the Mississippi Sports Hall of Fame.
