= John Rubenstein =

American developmental neurobiologist and psychiatrist

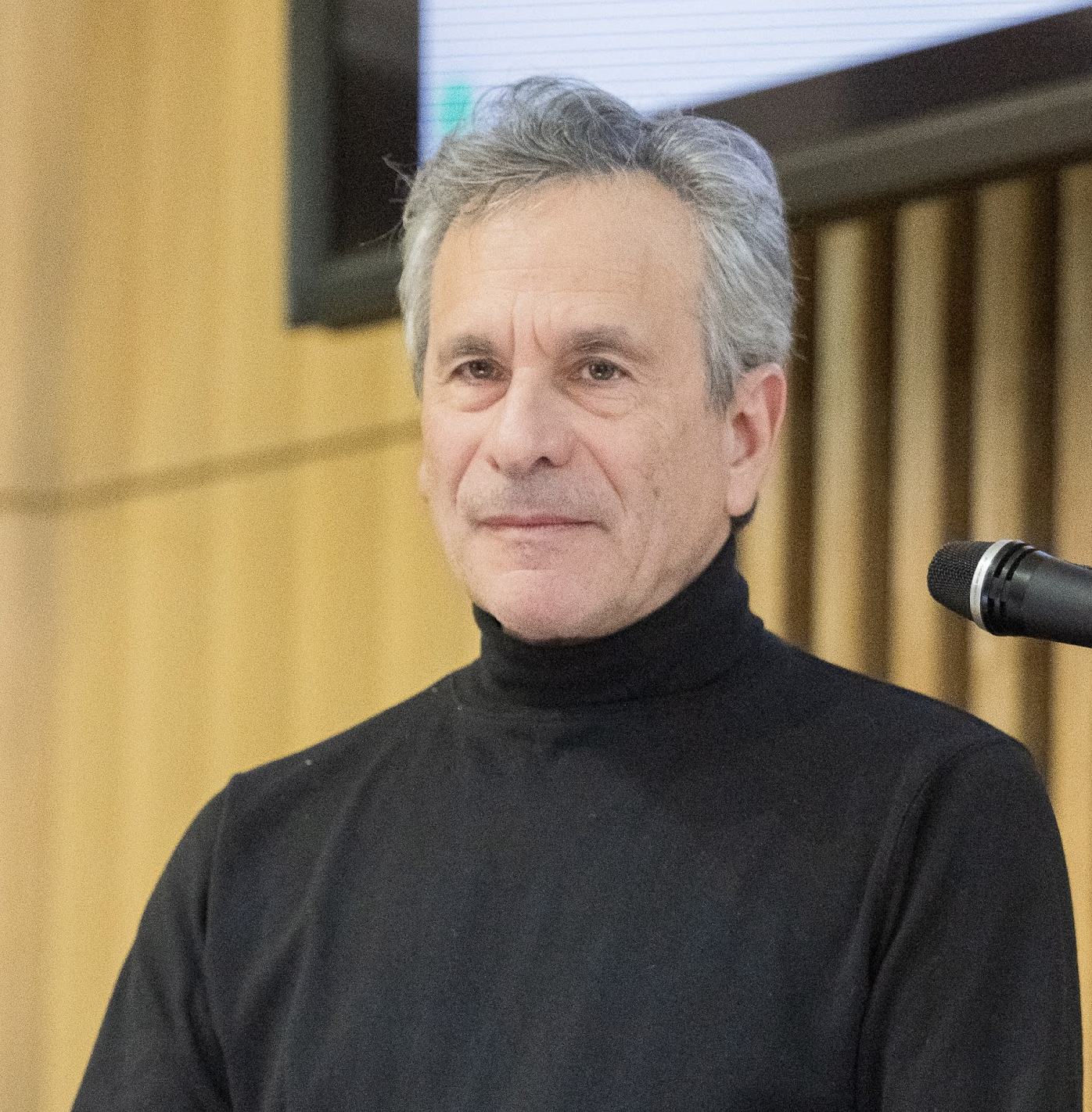
- Born: John L. R. Rubenstein; San Mateo, California, U.S.
- Education: Stanford University (BS, MD, PhD)
- Known for: Forebrain development, gene regulatory networks, cortical patterning
- Awards: Elected member, National Academy of Medicine (2006); Elected member, American Academy of Arts and Sciences (2016); Elected member, National Academy of Sciences (2020)
- Scientific career
- Fields: Developmental neurobiology, Psychiatry
- Institutions: University of California, San Francisco

John Louis Rubenstein is an American developmental neurobiologist and psychiatrist. He is known for his research on the molecular and genetic mechanisms underlying forebrain development. He is the Nina Ireland Distinguished Professor in Child Psychiatry at the University of California, San Francisco (UCSF), where he directs the Nina Ireland Laboratory of Developmental Neurobiology.

== Early life and education ==
Rubenstein was born in San Mateo, California. He graduated from the Thacher School in 1973 and received a Bachelor of Science degree in Chemistry from Stanford University in 1977, graduating with honors, having done research with Randall Morriss, Arthur Kornberg, William Wickner, Douglas Brutlag, and David Clayton. He was elected to Phi Beta Kappa and became an associate member of Sigma Xi. He entered the M.D.-Ph.D. program at Stanford and earned his Ph.D. in Biophysics in 1982, working under Harden M. McConnell and James Rothman. From 1984 to 1986, he conducted postdoctoral research with François Jacob, Jean François Nicolas, and Joshua Sanes at the Pasteur Institute. Between 1986 and 1991, he completed clinical training in child psychiatry, and postdoctoral training with Roland Ciaranello at Stanford.

== Career ==
Rubenstein joined the UCSF Department of Psychiatry in 1991. He is affiliated with several programs at UCSF, including the Program in Biological Sciences, the Biomedical Sciences Program, and the Institute of Molecular Medicine.

He is also a co-founder of Neurona Therapeutics, a biotechnology company focused on developing cell-based therapies for epilepsy and other neurological disorders.

== Research ==
Rubenstein is known for his work on the transcriptional and molecular mechanisms that regulate the development of the cerebral cortex and basal ganglia. His research has defined transcription factors such as DLX2, NKX2-1, and TBR1, and growth factors including FGF8 and FGF17, that play critical roles in regional and cell-type specification during brain development. He has studied the development of both cortical and subcortical projection neurons and interneurons, and showed that cortical interneurons are generated in the basal ganglia and migrate tangentially to the cortex. He has also investigated the roles of transcription factors in axon pathfinding and synapse development.

His more recent work uses epigenomics to identify human and mouse genomic regulatory elements (enhancers) that are active during forebrain development. In conjunction with his work on transcription factor functions, he is deciphering gene regulatory networks that control forebrain development, and that may be dysregulated in neurodevelopmental disorders such as autism spectrum disorder and epilepsy.

== Selected honors and awards ==
- 1977: Honors in Chemistry, Stanford University
- 2001: Elected to the American College of Neuropsychopharmacology
- 2004: Krieg Cortical Discoverer Award, Cajal Club
- 2006: Elected to the National Academy of Medicine
- 2016: APA Ittleson Award for Research in Child and Adolescent Psychiatry
- 2016: Elected to the American Academy of Arts and Sciences
- 2016: Ruane Prize for Outstanding Child and Adolescent Psychiatric Research by Brain & Behavior Research Foundation
- 2020: Elected to the National Academy of Sciences
- 2021: W. Maxwell Cowan Award for Developmental Neuroscience
- 2026: Gruber Prize in Neuroscience

== Selected publications ==
- Rubenstein, J.L.R., Martinez, S., Shimamura, K., & Puelles, L. (1994). The prosomeric model: a proposal for the organization of the embryonic forebrain. Science, 266, 578–580.
- Anderson, S.A., Eisenstat, D.D., Shi, L., & Rubenstein, J.L.R. (1997). Interneuron migration from basal forebrain: dependence on Dlx genes. Science, 278, 474–476.
- Miyashita-Lin, E.M., Hevner, R., Wassarman, K.M., Martinez, S., & Rubenstein, J.L.R. (1999). Early neocortical regionalization is preserved in the absence of thalamic innervation. Science, 285, 906–909.
- Hevner, R.F., Shi, L., Justice, N., Hsueh, Y.-P., Sheng, M., Smiga, S., Bulfone, A., Goffinet, A.M., & Rubenstein, J.L.R. (2001). Tbr1 regulates differentiation of the preplate and layer 6. Neuron, 29, 353–366.
- Marín, O., Yaron, A., Bagri, A., Tessier-Lavigne, M., & Rubenstein, J.L.R. (2001). Sorting of striatal and cortical interneurons regulated by semaphorin-neuropilin interactions. Science, 293(5531), 872–875.
- Visel, A., Taher, L., Girgis, H., May, D., Golonzhka, O., Hoch, R., McKinsey, G.L., Pattabiraman, K., Silberberg, S.N., Blow, M.J., Hansen, D.V., Nord, A.S., Akiyama, J.A., Holt, A., Hosseini, R., Phouanenavong, S., Plajzer-Frick, I., Shoukry, M., Afzal, V., Kaplan, T., Kriegstein, A.R., Rubin, E.M., Ovcharenko, I., Pennacchio, L.A., & Rubenstein, J.L.R. (2013). A high-resolution enhancer atlas of the developing telencephalon. Cell, 152(4), 895–908.
- Pattabiraman, K., Golonzhka, O., Lindtner, S., Nord, A.S., Taher, L., Hoch, R., Silberberg, S.N., Zhang, D., Chen, B., Zeng, H., Pennacchio, L., Puelles, L., Visel, A., & Rubenstein, J.L.R. (2014). Transcriptional regulation of enhancers active in protodomains of the developing cerebral cortex. Neuron, 82(5), 989–1003.
- Sandberg, M., Flandin, P., Silberberg, S.N., Su-Feher, L., Price, J.D., Hu, J.S., Kim, C., Nord, A.S., & Rubenstein, J.L.R. (2016). Transcriptional networks controlled by NKX2-1 in the development of forebrain GABAergic neurons. Neuron, 91(6), 1260–1275.
- Fazel Darbandi, S., Robinson Schwartz, S.E., Qi, Q., Catta-Preta, R., Pai, E.L.-L., Mandell, J.D., Everitt, A., Rubin, A., Krasnoff, R.A., Katzman, S., Tastad, D., Nord, A.S., Willsey, A.J., Chen, B., State, M.W., Sohal, V.S., & Rubenstein, J.L.R. (2018). Neonatal Tbr1 dosage controls cortical layer 6 connectivity. Neuron, 100(4), 831–845.
- Markenscoff-Papadimitriou, E., Whalen, S., Przytycki, P., Thomas, R., Binyameen, F., Nowakowski, T.J., Kriegstein, A.R., Sanders, S.J., State, M.W., Pollard, K.S., & Rubenstein, J.L.R. (2020). A chromatin accessibility atlas of the developing human telencephalon. Cell, 182(3), 754–769.
