= Dot Murphy =

American basketball player and coach

Personal information
- Born: September 29, 1952 (age 74)

Career information
- High school: Starkville (Starkville, Mississippi)
- College: Mississippi University for Women (1971–1974)
- Position: Forward
- Coaching career: 1975–1982

Career history

Coaching
- 1975–1976: UT Martin (assistant)
- 1976–1977: Itawamba JC
- 1977–1982: Mississippi University for Women

Career coaching record
- AIAW: 50–84 (.373)
Medals
Women's basketball
Representing the United States
Universiade
Silver medal – second place	1973 Moscow	Team

Dot Murphy
Hinds Eagles
- Title: Assistant coach

Career history
- Hinds JC / CC (1984–present) (Assistant coach)

Dorothy Faye Murphy (née Easterwood; born September 20, 1952) is an American former basketball player and coach, and current junior college football assistant coach for Hinds Community College. She became the first female football coach in National Junior College Athletic Association history when she was hired to coach wide receivers at Hinds in 1984.

== Playing career and personal ==
Murphy was born to Thad, a high school football coach in Mississippi, and Faye Easterwood on September 20, 1952. She attended Starkville High School.

She played basketball at the Mississippi University for Women (MUW) as a forward. In 1973, she was a starter for the United States women's World University Games basketball team that earned a silver medal at the 1973 Summer Universiade in Moscow. Her roommate in Moscow was Pat Summitt. She earned All-America honors in 1974. In 2003, The Clarion-Ledger noted Murphy as the "greatest athlete in Mississippi University for Women history". She met her husband Gene Murphy at Mississippi State University as a graduate student. The couple married in 1976.

== Basketball coaching career ==
Murphy was an assistant coach for the University of Tennessee at Martin women's basketball team in 1975–76. Itawamba Junior College hired her as head basketball coach for the 1976–77 season, and she was the head basketball coach for the Mississippi University for Women from 1977 to 1982. Her record at MUW in five seasons was 50–84. Her position was terminated when MUW moved from Association for Intercollegiate Athletics for Women (AIAW) Division I to NCAA Division II for the 1982–83 season.

== Football coaching career ==
Murphy's husband Gene was hired as defensive coordinator for the Hinds Junior College football team in 1983. Dot Murphy was hired by Hinds, later called Hinds Community College, as their wide receivers coach for the football program in August 1984, joining her husband on the coaching staff. She became the first female football coach in National Junior College Athletic Association history. The Murphys had their third child in 1986. Her husband Gene was promoted to head coach in 1987. Murphy was chairman of the Health and Physical Education Department at Hinds by 1994. She took a year off from coaching in 1995, returning in August 1996.

Murphy coached future NFL players Hason Graham and Purvis Hunt at Hinds. In 1996, the TNT television program Football America aired an episode featuring Murphy. She was named to the Mississippi Sports Hall of Fame in 1999. In 2000, Sports Illustrated ranked her 50th on their "20th Century's 50 Greatest Sports Figures from Mississippi" list.
