= Chief Choc =

Former mascot of Mississippi College

- University: Mississippi College
- Conference: ASC
- Description: Anthropomorphic Native American caricature
- First seen: 1921

Chief Choc is the former mascot of Mississippi College, a private Christian university located in Clinton, Mississippi. In August 2005, the NCAA announced that schools with "hostile and abusive racial/ethnic/national origin mascots, nicknames or imagery" would be banned from championship events.

== Overview ==
The original announcement named 18 colleges and universities with "hostile and abusive" mascots, including the Mississippi College Choctaws.

According to Mississippi College President Lee Royce, however, the university shares a "mutual relationship of respect and cooperation" with the Mississippi Band of Choctaw Indians and the tribe approved of the school's use of Choctaw names and images.

NCAA spokesman Bob Williams said the appeals were granted because individual, sovereign tribes announced their approval of the use of names and images. Most of the other schools use generic terms like "Indians" or "Braves" as mascots, so Williams said "the tribal issue isn't in play at all in their particular cases."

Four schools - Chowan College, Midwestern State University, Southeastern Oklahoma State University and the University of Louisiana-Monroe - decided not to fight this ruling, making immediate changes to their mascots and logos.

Alcorn State University (the "Braves") and Arkansas State University (the Indians) have not filed appeals or started changing their mascots and logos.

In a letter dated February 17, 2006, Mississippi College received word that the NCAA has removed its policy restrictions in the use of the name Choctaw for MC athletics.

In a statement, President Lee Royce stated:

“We are pleased with the ruling from the NCAA giving their approval of our request to remove Mississippi College from the list of institutions subject to the policy’s restrictions. We are very appreciative of the Mississippi Band of Choctaw Indians’ support of our use of the Choctaw name, and look forward to continuing our mutual relationship of respect and cooperation.”

"Although the NCAA ... continues to believe the stereotyping of Native Americans is wrong," the group said in a release announcing the exemption, "it recognizes that a Native American tribe is a distinct political community and, therefore, respects the authority of the tribe to permit universities and colleges to use its name and imagery."
