= Joan Bonvicini =

American basketball coach

Biographical details
- Born: October 10, 1953 (age 73)
- Education: Southern Connecticut (1971–1975)

Coaching career (HC unless noted)
- 1979–1991: Long Beach State
- 1991–2008: Arizona
- 2009–2016: Seattle

Head coaching record
- Overall: 701–421 (.625)

Accomplishments and honors

Championships
- 2× NCAA Regional—Final Four (1987, 1988)

Joan Bonvicini (born October 10, 1953) is a former head basketball coach. Most recently, she was the head coach for the Seattle University women's basketball team, the Redhawks, and one of only 18 coaches in Division I women's basketball history with 701 career victories. She was head coach at the University of Arizona for 17 seasons, leading the Wildcats to the Women's National Invitation Tournament championship in 1996. She was fired by Arizona on March 17, 2008, with one year left on her contract, after a disappointing 10–20 record in her final season. Before joining Arizona in 1991, she coached the Long Beach State 49ers to a 325–71 mark over 12 seasons. During her tenure, the 49ers won at least 24 games each season, winning 10 Big West Conference titles and making 10 consecutive NCAA tournament appearances, including Final Four appearances in 1987 and 1988.

Bonvicini is the all-time most successful coach in the history of University of Arizona. She guided the Wildcats to nine post-season appearances, including one Women's National Invitation Tournament championship. The Wildcats finished in the upper echelon of the Pacific-10 Conference nine years under her direction. In February 2007, Bonvicini reached the 600 win milestone, becoming the 18th coach in NCAA Division I women's basketball history to reach this mark.

She coached many talented players at Long Beach, including LaTaunya Pollard, the 1983 Wade Trophy winner, 3-time 1st team All-American, 1980 Olympic Team member, and member of the women's basketball hall of fame; 2-time 1st team All-American and 1988 U.S. Olympic Team member Cindy Brown; 1985 1st team All-American Kirsten Cummings; and 2-time 1st team All-American Penny Toler, the current general manager of the WNBA's Los Angeles Sparks.

At Arizona, she coached one All-American, five honorable mention All-American selections, one Pacific-10 Player of the Year, and 14 Academic All-Pacific-10 selections.

Entering the 2009–10 season, Bonvicini held a career mark of 612–294 as a head coach, including a 287–223 record at Arizona. In Arizona's 2003–04 season, she led the Wildcats to a perfect home record and a regular season Pacific-10 title.

She is a 1975 graduate of Southern Connecticut State University, where, as a guard, she led her team to third and fourth place in the AIAW tournament (the AIAW existed prior to the NCAA allowing women to compete for national titles). Bonvicini was a finalist for the 1976 U.S. Olympic Basketball Team.

Bonvicini was inducted as a player into the Southern Connecticut State University Hall of Fame in 1989, the Connecticut Women's Basketball Hall of Fame in 1994 and the New England Basketball Hall of Fame in 2007. In October 1996, she was inducted as a coach into the Long Beach State Hall of Fame. Bonvicini began her coaching career under the wing of two of the game's finest coaches: Darlene May of California State Polytechnic University, Pomona and Frances Schaafsma of California State University, Long Beach.

== USA Basketball ==
Bonvicini was chosen as the assistant coach of the team representing the US in 1982 at the William Jones Cup competition in Taipei, Taiwan. The team started out strongly, winning their first four games by 16 or more points. In the fifth game, they were matched against Australia. The game was close until the end. With a half-minute remaining, the USA held a one-point margin. The USA extended the lead to three points on two free throws, the Aussies brought it back to one with two free throws of their own, and the USA hit two free throws with two seconds left in the game to secure the 65–62 victory. The next two games were easy victories, then the USA faced unbeaten Canada in the final game. The game was very close, but the USA fell to Canada 70–67 to finish with a single loss and the silver medal. USA players Lea Henry and Paula McGee were named to the All-Tournament Team.

Bonvicini was the head coach of the team representing the US at the World University Games held in Buffalo, New York in July 1993. The USA opened with double-digit margin victories over Israel, Taiwan, and Ukraine. Their next game was against Russia, and they held a single point lead with just over ten minutes to go in the game, but they finished strong, and won 72–55. The next game was against Cuba, which included six players from their 1992 Olympic team. The USA pulled out to a 15-point lead at halftime, had extended to an 18-point lead at one time, but Cuba proved to be too strong, and came back to defeat the USA 88–80. After beating Japan, the USA faced China, whose team also featured many members of their silver medal-winning Olympic team. The USA fell behind; their comeback attempt fell two points shy of tying the game. The final score in favor of China was 75–73. The opponent in the bronze medal game was Lithuania. The USA team won 83–73 to earn the bronze medal.

== See also ==
- List of college women's basketball career coaching wins leaders
