= Charley Steiner =

American sportscaster and journalist (born 1949)

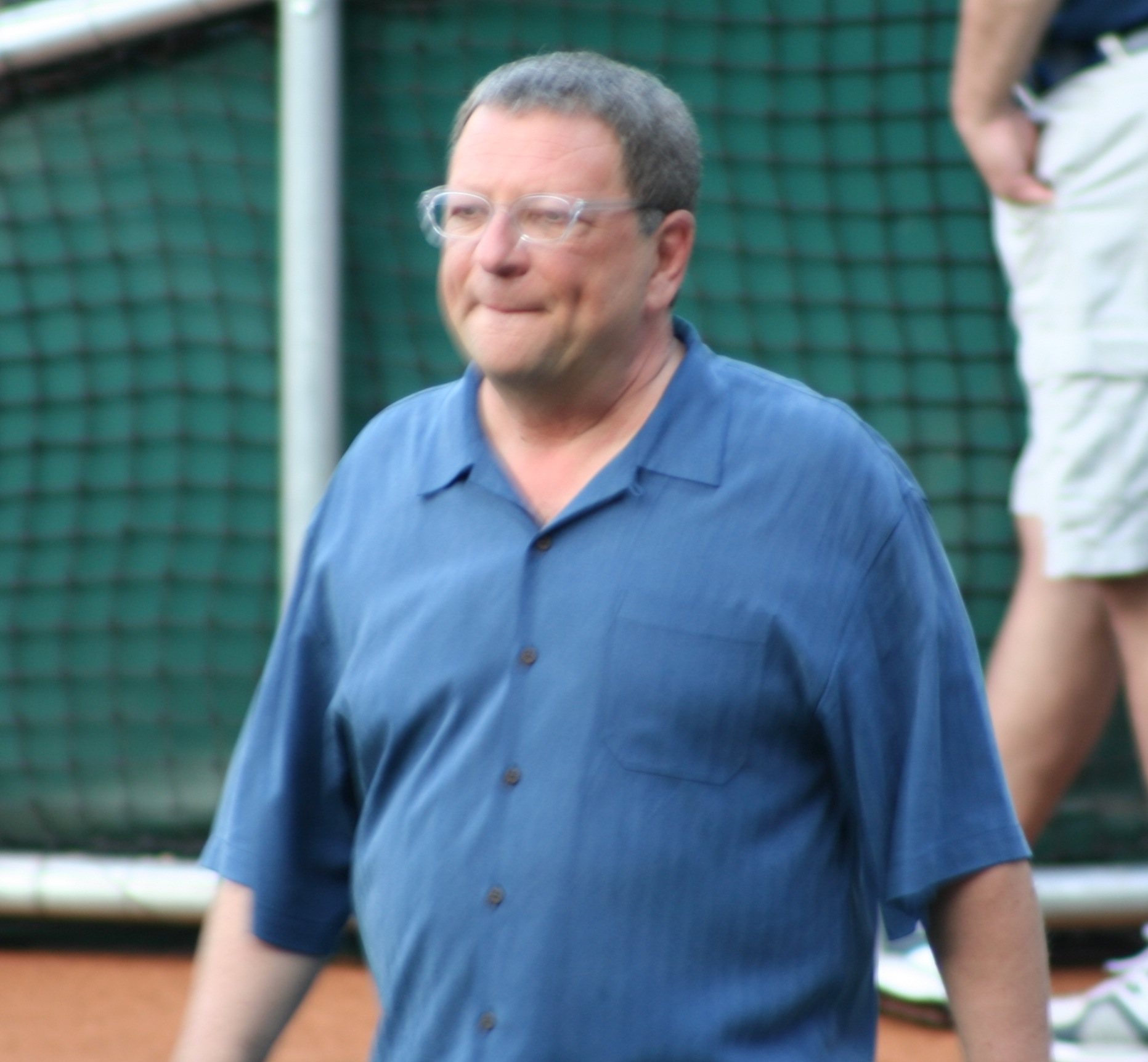
- Steiner in 2008
- Born: Charles Harris Steiner; July 17, 1949 (age 77); New York City, U.S.
- Education: Bradley University
- Occupation: Sports announcer
- Years active: 1969–present
- Term: 1988–2002
- Sports commentary career
- Team: Los Angeles Dodgers
- Genre: Play-by-play
- Sport: Major League Baseball

Charles Harris Steiner (born July 17, 1949) is an American sportscaster and broadcast journalist. He is currently the radio play-by-play announcer for the Los Angeles Dodgers, paired with Rick Monday.

== Early life and education ==
Steiner was born in 1949 in Forest Hills, Queens, New York City. He grew up a Brooklyn Dodgers fan in a Jewish family in Malverne, New York, already idolizing Vin Scully at the age of seven. He attended Bradley University in Peoria, Illinois, graduating in 1971.

== Early career ==
Steiner began his career as a newscaster for WIRL radio in Peoria, in 1969, while still a student at Bradley. In 1971, after graduation from college, he began hosting his first sports show on KSTT radio in Davenport, Iowa. A year later, Steiner moved to New Haven, Connecticut, and worked for WAVZ radio as its news director, before moving north to Hartford and WPOP radio in a similar capacity.

In 1977, Steiner relocated to WERE (1300 AM) in Cleveland, Ohio, where he served as a sportscaster and later news director. While in Cleveland, he received his first television exposure when WKYC-TV hired him as a sports commentator.

Steiner entered the New York market in 1978 at WXLO-FM where he did newscasts for, among others, then-morning host and future actor Jay Thomas. He later moved over to sister station WOR for several years as its morning drive sportscaster, while working simultaneously as the sports director for the RKO Radio Network. He was also the play-by-play voice for the USFL's New Jersey Generals entire existence from 1983 to 1985, and for the NFL's New York Jets in 1986 and 1987.

It was during his time with RKO Radio that he was involved in a fracas at the conclusion of a press conference after John McEnroe had won his semifinals match at Wimbledon in 1981. Throughout the tournament, McEnroe had consistently requested not to discuss the status of his relationship with then-girlfriend Stacy Margolin. When Daily Star gossip columnist James Whittaker persisted in broaching the subject, McEnroe cursed at him and the British media and prematurely ended the press conference by storming out of the room. Steiner confronted Whittaker to say, "C'mon, man, you are just messing it up for everybody else. We want to get our quotes." Right at that point, Nigel Clarke, another British reporter who then worked for the Daily Mirror, stuck his index finger in Steiner's face. Clarke then got up on a chair and attempted to rain punches down on Steiner who successfully wrestled his adversary to the floor. Surprisingly, Steiner later was personally thanked by the head of the All England Lawn Tennis and Croquet Club who also had a disdain for the British tabloids.

== Career at ESPN ==
Steiner joined ESPN in 1988, primarily as an anchor on SportsCenter. In addition to those duties, he served as the network's lead boxing analyst.

Steiner was involved in many comical situations during his tenure on SportsCenter, including one broadcast in 1993 when Carl Lewis sang "The Star-Spangled Banner" prior to a New Jersey Nets game. Amused by hearing Lewis' terrible rendition of the song, Steiner began chortling during the SportsCenter show that night, unable to stop until the show ended. His famous comment on the event was that the song had apparently been written by "Francis Scott Off-Key", a pun on the author of "The Star-Spangled Banner", Francis Scott Key.

Steiner was featured in a series of well-known television promos from ESPN's This is SportsCenter comical promo campaign. In 1999, amid fears of the Y2K situation, Steiner starred in a promo where the SportsCenter cast spoke about a "contingency plan" at ESPN's studios after Y2K, and Steiner was featured wearing a tie as a head band (along with Braveheart-style face paint) and screaming the phrase "Follow me to freedom!" A second promo featured Steiner being traded from ESPN to Melrose Place in exchange for actor Andrew Shue. While Shue delivers a straight-up report on a meeting with Paul Tagliabue, Steiner is then seen wearing shorts and introduces himself to Laura Leighton (in character as Sydney Andrews) as the new "pool boy" in the show's apartment complex. Steiner starred in a third promo with boxer Evander Holyfield. In the opening shot, Evander questions Stuart Scott about Steiner's assessment that Holyfield is only the "50th best heavyweight of all-time"; Stuart then deadpans that he meant "the 50th best heavyweight — in Georgia". In the final scene, an angry Holyfield is seen roaming the halls of ESPN screaming, "Charley! Come on out and get your whoopin'! Charley, come on out! Steiner!" Steiner is seen cowering under a desk. In another promo for the campaign, Steiner talks about how at ESPN the personalities can cover the sports that they enjoy, and he says that his is boxing. During the promo several personalities try to pick a fight with him and he walks away from them all until the end when Steiner is getting into his car and Otto the Orange comes up to him and Steiner takes out all of his frustrations out on Otto by punching him square in the face.

On August 9, 2004, Steiner returned to ESPN to co-host an "old school" version of SportsCenter with Bob Ley.

Steiner also hosted a program on the NFL Network called Football America, which ran from 2003 to 2005. He has also been shown in frequent cuts of interviews for the network's NFL Top 10 series, discussing such subjects as former Jets defensive end Mark Gastineau. Cuts of his play-by-play of the Jets' September 1986 overtime victory (51–45) over the Dolphins are used in retrospectives on that game. Steiner was also interviewed on the 1986 New York Jets–Cleveland Browns playoff game in which he proclaimed the Jets would win following a fourth-quarter touchdown only to see the Browns tie the game and win in double overtime.

== Baseball broadcasting ==
=== ESPN Radio ===
When ESPN Radio gained broadcast rights for Major League Baseball's national radio package from CBS in 1998, Steiner became its lead announcer, working Sunday night games, the All-Star Game, and postseason games. (Steiner never worked the World Series while he was calling games for ESPN Radio, however, as those were covered by then-lead TV voice Jon Miller.)

Steiner's most controversial home run call came in the 2001 All-Star Game at Safeco Field on July 10. His utterance of "Who wrote this script?" to punctuate Cal Ripken Jr.'s third-inning homer off Chan-Ho Park fueled speculation about whether the achievement was legitimate or that the pitch was grooved to enable a legendary sendoff.

=== New York Yankees (2002–2004) ===
Steiner left ESPN in 2002 and joined the New York Yankees' radio booth, replacing Michael Kay as John Sterling's play-by-play partner. Steiner was at the microphone when Yankees third baseman Aaron Boone won Game 7 of the 2003 American League Championship Series with a home run in the eleventh inning to defeat the Boston Red Sox:

There's a fly ball deep to left... it's on its way... there it goes... and the Yankees are going to the World Series! Aaron Boone has hit a home run! The Yankees go to the World Series for the thirty-ninth time in their remarkable history! Aaron Boone down the left field line... they are waiting for him at home plate, and now he dives into the scrum! The Yankees win it, six to five!

After Steiner completed his call, he joined Sterling in his famous "Yankees win! Theeeeeeeeeeee Yankees win!" call, saying he "had always wanted to do that".

Steiner and Sterling reportedly had a contentious relationship during their three years together.

=== Los Angeles Dodgers (2005–2023, 2025–present) ===
Steiner left the Yankees after the following season, his last game being the infamous Game 7 of the 2004 American League Championship Series in which the Red Sox completed its historic "reverse sweep" over its rivals after trailing 3 games to 0. He was originally slated to move to the YES Network as a studio host, but after Ross Porter, longtime radio voice of the Los Angeles Dodgers (Steiner's favorite team growing up, with the team still based in Brooklyn) was let go by the team, Steiner was hired to take his place.

For four years covering the 2005 through 2008 seasons, the Dodgers' unique broadcasting arrangement had Steiner teamed with analyst Rick Monday and working play-by-play on radio during all home and intra-divisional road games. However, Steiner's duties during these games would begin with the fourth inning and cover the remainder of the game, as the first three innings were a radio/television simulcast voiced by Vin Scully. Steiner handled television play-by-play on all other games (with analyst Steve Lyons), primarily road contests east of the Rocky Mountains. For the 2009 season, the Dodgers had Steiner and Monday as their radio team for all 162 games, though the Scully simulcast of the first three innings would remain. Starting in 2014, Steiner was paired with Orel Hershiser on the television broadcast for all games Scully did not call, and broadcast on the radio with Monday the other games.

Following Vin Scully's retirement from the Dodgers after the 2016 season, the team split its radio-TV duties between Steiner and Joe Davis, with Steiner remaining on the radio side but switching to television on those occasions Davis has a Fox Sports assignment. Starting in 2019, he worked radio only, with Tim Neverett and later Stephen Nelson replacing him as the alternate TV announcers.

Steiner was unable to work any games for the Dodgers during the 2024 season due to his battle with multiple myeloma blood cancer, but he did attend Game 4 of the 2024 World Series. He returned to call the Dodgers' domestic Opening Day at Dodger Stadium against the Detroit Tigers on March 27, 2025, but was forced to leave the radio booth during the 7th inning stretch due to cancer aftereffects (fatigue). (Steiner's sudden disappearance from the booth was not addressed during the broadcast apart from a throwaway line from Nelson, "I didn't know I was going to work today.") He returned in 2026, and called his first full game since 2024 on August 15, 2026.

== Awards and accomplishments ==
Steiner, an Emmy Award recipient, was inducted into the National Radio Hall of Fame on November 9, 2013, becoming the 17th sportscaster admitted into the Hall. In December 2010 he was awarded an honorary Doctorate in Humane Letters from his alma mater Bradley University, where he gave the commencement address. Steiner received the United Press International award for "Best Sportscaster for New York, New Jersey and Connecticut" in 1981, 1983, and 1985. His football play-by-play work earned him the New York State Broadcasters Association Award for "Best Radio Play-by-Play" in 1983, 1984, and 1987. During his fourteen years at ESPN, Steiner won a CableACE award for a documentary on Muhammad Ali and a Clarion award for his coverage of the Mike Tyson rape trial. Bradley named its school of sports communication for Steiner at a ceremony in March, 2015.
