= Jackson Brumfield =

American football player (1931–)

No. 86
- Position: Defensive end

Personal information
- Born: May 1, 1931; Franklinton, Louisiana, U.S.
- Died: April 10, 2017 (aged 85); Franklinton, Louisiana, U.S.
- Listed height: 6 ft 2 in (1.88 m)
- Listed weight: 215 lb (98 kg)

Career information
- High school: Franklinton
- College: Mississippi Southern (1950–1953)
- NFL draft: 1954: undrafted

Career history
- San Francisco 49ers (1954); San Francisco 49ers (1957)*; Washington Redskins (1958)*
- * Offseason or practice squad member only
- Stats at Pro Football Reference

Jackson Louis Brumfield (May 1, 1931 – April 10, 2017) was an American professional football defensive end who played for the San Francisco 49ers of the National Football League (NFL). He played college football for the Mississippi Southern Southerners.

== Early life ==
Jackson Louis Brumfield was born on May 1, 1931, in Franklinton, Louisiana. He attended Franklinton High School.

== College career ==
Brumfield enrolled at Mississippi Southern College to play college football for the Southerners. He was on the freshman team in 1950 and was a three-year varsity letterman from 1951 to 1953.

== Professional career ==
Brumfield went undrafted in the 1954 NFL draft. He started all 12 games for the 49ers in 1954, and recovered three fumbles, as the team went 7–4–1. He was named the 49ers' defensive lineman of the year. Brumfield missed the next two seasons while serving in the United States Army. He was named to the All-Army football team while in the military. He returned to the 49ers in 1957 but was released on September 18, 1957, before the final preseason game.

Brunfield was signed by the Washington Redskins on April 21, 1958. However, he was later released.

== Personal life ==
Brumfield was a football coach at South Terrebonne High School from 1959 to 1969 and Bowling Green School from 1972 to 1975. He was inducted into the Mississippi Sports Hall of Fame in 2001. He died on April 10, 2017, in Franklinton.
