= Vic Purvis =

American football player (1943–2026)

No. 31
- Position: Defensive back

Personal information
- Born: November 17, 1943; Brandon, Mississippi, U.S.
- Died: May 31, 2026 (aged 82)

Career information
- High school: Puckett (Puckett, Mississippi)
- College: Southern Miss
- NFL draft: 1966: undrafted

Career history
- Boston Patriots (1966–1967)

Career NFL statistics
- Games played: 16
- Total return yards: 228
- Stats at Pro Football Reference

James Victor Purvis (November 17, 1943 – May 31, 2026) was an American professional football player who was a defensive back for the Boston Patriots of the American Football League (AFL). He played college football for the Southern Miss Eagles.

== College career ==
Purvis was a member of the Southern Miss Golden Eagles at the University of Southern Mississippi for five seasons, playing on the freshman team and then redshirting his sophomore year. He became the Golden Eagles starting quarterback as a redshirt sophomore. Over the course of his collegiate career Purvis compiled a record of 18-8-1 while passing for 1,727 yards and eight touchdowns with 21 interceptions and rushing for 1,495 yards and nine touchdowns. Purvis was inducted into the Southern Miss Athletic Hall of Fame in 1972.

== Professional career ==
Purvis was signed by the Boston Patriots of the American Football League as an undrafted free agent in 1966 to play defensive back and to return kicks. Purvis was released by the Patriots on September 16, 1967, after he sustained a career-ending shoulder injury.

== Post-football ==
After the end of his football career Purvis served as the color analyst for Southern Miss football for 41 years before retiring after the 2014 season. Purvis was inducted into the Mississippi Sports Hall of Fame in 2006.

Purvis died from complications of Alzheimer's disease on May 31, 2026, at the age of 82.
