= List of programs broadcast by NFL Network =

The following is a list of programs broadcast by the NFL Network.

== Current ==
- America's Game: The Missing Rings
- NFL Total Access
- America's Game: The Super Bowl Champions
- Around the League (formerly Team Cam)
- The Coaches Show
- First on the Field (now NFL GameDay First)
- A Football Life
- Good Morning Football
- NFL Fantasy Live
- NFL Films Presents
- NFL Follies
- NFL GameDay
- NFL GameDay Morning
- NFL RedZone Replay
- NFL Replay
- NFL Scoreboard
- NFL Top 10
- NFL Weekly Countdown (formerly Starting 11)
- Path to the Draft
- Sound FX (formerly Live Wire)
- The Insiders
- The Timeline
- Thursday Night Football
- The Top 100: NFL's Greatest Players
- Undrafted

== Former ==
Note: some of these programs may still air in reruns.

- 21st & Primetime
- Coachspeak
- College Football Now
- College Scoreboard
- Film Session
- Football America
- Greatest 4th Quarters
- In Their Own Words
- Making the Squad
- Mic'd Up
- NFL AM
- NFL Cheerleader Playoffs
- NFL Europa
- NFL Game of the Week
- NFL's Greatest Games (also occasionally on ESPN2)
- NFL HQ
- NFL Network Now - NFL news
- Playbook
- Pick'em
- Point After
- Power Rankings
- Put Up Your Dukes
- Six Days to Sunday
- Sounds of the Game
- Star Spangled Sundays
- Who Is ...?

== Events covered annually ==
- Hall of Fame Game
- Inside Minicamp
- Inside Training Camp
- Live from the Owners Meeting
- Live from the Pro Bowl
- Live from the Rookie Symposium
- Live from the Super Bowl
- NFL Draft
- NFL Preseason
- NFL Schedule Release
- NFL Scouting Combine
- Pro Football Hall of Fame Induction Ceremonies
