= Football America =

1996 book by Phil Barber and Ray Didinger

Football America is a 1996 American sports history book by Phil Barber and Ray Didinger. It was later adapted into a film series that was released by the National Football League in 1996. It was also the name of a follow-up series that aired on NFL Network from 2003 to 2005 on a regular basis.

== Content ==
The books and TV shows feature stories about various players and teams, including:

- A 65-year-old semipro football player in Agoura Hills, California, who beat opponents a fraction of his age.
- Dot Easterwood Murphy, wide receivers coach at Hinds Community College in Raymond MS.
- The football rivalry between members of the New York City fire and police departments.
- An Arab-American football star at Azusa Pacific University who uses football to overcome increasing hostility against his people following "9/11."
- Players at Linfield College in Oregon caught in the crossfire of the Pearl Harbor attack.
- A single-wing offense run by a small college and a high school.
- "Turkey Bowl" flag football games in Massachusetts and North Carolina.
- A "Turkey Bowl" full contact football game set in Eau Claire, Wisconsin.
- The Gallaudet College team.

== Production history ==
Turner Network Television, which then held partial rights to NFL games, telecast the original film in 1992. The 2003–05 series was hosted by veteran sportscaster Charley Steiner. It aired on Sunday and Monday nights, at the same time ESPN and ABC presented their prime time games.

Football America was "cancelled" by NFL Network in 2006, when the network revamped its lineup; there is now more emphasis on live programs and major projects like America's Game: The Super Bowl Champions. But the show still appears very occasionally; the show aired at the same time the Thanksgiving Day games were played in 2006.

In 2014, Football America returned as a one-hour special that aired during Fox's coverage of Super Bowl XLVIII. The revamped special focused on the NFL's "Together We Make Football" campaign. Another edition of the special aired during NBC's coverage of Super Bowl XLIX the following year.
