= Mississippi Christian Choctaws =

- University: Mississippi Christian University
- Nickname: Choctaws
- NCAA: Division II
- Conference: Gulf South
- Athletic director: Kenny Bizot
- Location: Clinton, Mississippi
- Varsity teams: 16 (8 men's, 8 women's)
- Football stadium: Robinson-Hale Stadium
- Basketball arena: A. E. Wood Coliseum
- Baseball stadium: Frierson Field
- Softball stadium: MC Softball Complex
- Soccer stadium: Robert P. Longabaugh Field
- Tennis venue: MC Tennis Complex
- Colors: Blue and celestial blue
- Mascot: Tushka
- Website: www.gochoctaws.com

The Mississippi Christian Choctaws, formerly known as the Mississippi College Choctaws, are the athletic teams that represent Mississippi Christian University, located in Clinton, Mississippi, in intercollegiate sports at the Division II level of the National Collegiate Athletic Association (NCAA). The Choctaws have primarily competed in the Gulf South Conference since the 2014–15 academic year.

Mississippi Christian competes in 18 intercollegiate varsity sports. Men's sports include baseball, basketball, cross country, golf, soccer, tennis, and track and field (indoor and outdoor); while women's sports include basketball, cross country, golf, soccer, softball, tennis, track and field (indoor and outdoor), and volleyball.

== History ==
Mississippi Christian participated in the national women's basketball championship tournament in 1974, 1976, and 1977. In 1974, the Lady Choctaws finished second to legendary Immaculata, 68–53, who won its third consecutive title.

For years Mississippi Christian was a dominant force in NCAA Division II athletics. MC won the Division II National Championship in 1989, however, Mississippi Christian's football tournament participation, along with its NCAA Division II national football championship, were vacated by the NCAA Committee on Infractions for recruiting violations.

The Board of Trustees of Mississippi Christian University voted in March 1995 for the university to become a member of Division III of the National Collegiate Athletic Association in the fall of 1997.

Mississippi Christian currently sponsors 16 sports. Since their transition to Division III in 1997, the Choctaws have won 25 American Southwest Conference championships. In 2007, the college won conference championships in women's cross country and men's basketball.

On July 11, 2014, the NCAA approved Mississippi Christian entering their second year of NCAA Division II candidacy. They became full members of NCAA Division II and a full Gulf South Conference member in 2016–17.

Mississippi Christian's biggest rivalry is with Millsaps College in nearby Jackson. After a more than 40-year hiatus, the two teams began meeting on the football field again in 2000. The rivalry is dubbed the Backyard Brawl.

The football team was dropped after the 2024 season.

== Conference affiliations ==
NCAA

- Gulf South Conference (1972–1996)
- American Southwest Conference (1996–2014)
- Gulf South Conference (2014–present)

== Varsity teams ==
Men's sports	Women's sports
Baseball	Basketball
Basketball	Cross country
Cross country	Golf
	Soccer
Golf	Softball
Soccer	Tennis
Tennis	Track and field^{†}
Track and field^{†}	Volleyball
† – Track and field includes both indoor and outdoor

=== Baseball ===
Mississippi Christian has had 2 Major League Baseball draft selections since the draft began in 1965.

Year	Player	Round	Team
2003	Bo Edmiston	15	Astros
2019	Blaine Crim	19	Rangers

== Athletic facilities ==
In the summer of 2005 Mississippi Christian opened new athletic practice fields which support soccer and football. Plans include expansion in the near future which will add an extra practice field as well as two new intramural fields for student flag football, soccer, and general student use.

== Choctaw nickname ==
In a letter dated February 17, 2006, Mississippi Christian received word that the NCAA has removed its policy restrictions in the use of the name Choctaw for MC athletics. The school did stop using the former mascot, Chief Choc.

Lee Royce, president of the college said, "We are pleased with the ruling from the NCAA giving their approval of our request to remove Mississippi College from the list of institutions subject to the policy’s restrictions. We are very appreciative of the Mississippi Band of Choctaw Indians’ support of our use of the Choctaw name, and look forward to continuing our mutual relationship of respect and cooperation."

Rev. Montie Davis of Pascagoula, MS came up with the mascot name "Choctaws" while attending college at Mississippi College. Prior to being named the Choctaws the schools football team was called the "Collegians." The 1921 football teams went 7–2–1 with wins over Tulane University and the University of Mississippi and also a tie with the University of Florida. After this great year the students at Mississippi College decided that the name Collegians just did not fit the team and decided to hold a contest for where students could submit possible nicknames which would be voted on. Rev. Davis found that an old Choctaw trail crossed the campus and it was part of the original Natchez Trace, so he entered the name "Choctaws." His suggestion, plus three other – Yellowjackets, Dutchies, and Warriors – were among the final four to be voted on. Rev. Davis was quick to point out to his fellow students why three of the names would not be acceptable. "Yellowjackets," he said, "were good only in dry weather" and just the week before the football team had played on a muddy and wet field. Dutchies was in honor of the president of MC, Dr. J.W. Provine, and wouldn't mean anything to people outside the school. Warriors? What Warriors? Rev. Davis let the students know that the Choctaws were known for their bravery, fair play, had speed to burn, could run like deer, and could swim like a fish if needed. After the final vote was cast, the name "Choctaws" was the clear winner and the school has been called that ever since the 1921 season.

== Notable alumni ==
=== Baseball ===
- Lane Burroughs
- Blaine Crim

=== Football ===
- Major Everett
- Shannon Garrett
- Joel Hitt
- Fred McAfee
- Michael Williams

=== Men's basketball ===
- Mike Jones
- Joel Hitt

=== Men's soccer ===
- Phillip Buffington
