= Jason Hinkin =

American pole vaulter

Jason Hinkin is a retired American pole vaulter. He won the NCAA Division I Indoor Pole Vault title in 1997. He attended Long Beach State University where he was a 5x All-American. His personal best is 5.70m/ 18'8 1/4". He also attended high school at Saint Francis, Mountain View, CA with Whitecaps and MLS goal keeper Joe Cannon.

Mr. Hinkin was Long Beach State's last individual champion in Track and Field, winning the 1997 NCAA indoor pole vault championship with a mark of 18'6.5". A five-time All-American, Hinkin was also a two-time Big West Champion in outdoor track and field. His NCAA-winning mark was the seventh best in the world in 1997, and still remains as the indoor Long Beach State record by six inches, while he recorded a career-best 18'7.5" mark that also still remains as the Long Beach State University record. Although he attended Long Beach State University, he was coached throughout his collegiate career by USATF Men's and Women's National Pole Vault Development Chair and renown pole vault coach, Brian Yokoyama. He was inducted into the LBSU Hall of Fame in 2013.
