= David F. Clayton =

American neuroscientist, biochemist

David Forrest Clayton
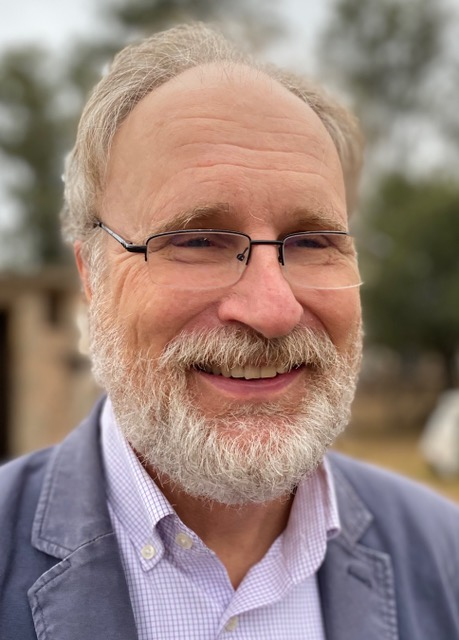
- David F. Clayton
- Occupations: Neuroscientist, biochemist, and academic

Academic background
- Education: ABJ., Journalism; BS., Biochemistry; Ph.D., Molecular Cell Biology
- Alma mater: University of Georgia; Rockefeller University

David Forrest Clayton is an American neuroscientist, biochemist, and academic. He is a professor and the chair of the Department of Genetics & Biochemistry at Clemson University.

Clayton is most known for his work on the interplay between the brain and the genome in regulating cognitive processes involved in the filtering, encoding, and retrieval of memories. He pioneered the application of molecular genetics to research using songbirds as a model for learning, memory, and brain development leading to whole genome sequencing of the zebra finch in 2010. His research has contributed to topics ranging from neurodegenerative disease to social behavior and he coined the term “Genomic action potential” to describe the complex, structured genomic response to acute experience. His research has been featured in newspapers including BBC News, The Wall Street Journal, and Newsweek.

== Education ==
Clayton completed his ABJ in Journalism from the University of Georgia in 1978. He then completed a Bachelor in Biochemistry in 1980 from the same institution. He pursued a Ph.D. in Molecular Cell Biology from The Rockefeller University in the laboratory of James E Darnell, Jr., which he completed in 1985. At Rockefeller he was introduced to studies of brain plasticity in songbirds by Fernando Nottebohm, with whom he then trained as a postdoc.

== Career ==
Clayton was appointed assistant professor of molecular neuroethology at Rockefeller University in 1986. In 1991 he moved to the University of Illinois Urbana-Champaign, where he held multiple appointments including serving as an assistant professor from 1991 to 1996, associate professor from 1996 to 2002, and full professor at the department of cell and developmental biology from 2002 to 2012. Subsequently, he joined the Queen Mary University of London (U.K.) and served as a professor of neuroscience at the school of biological and chemical sciences until 2020. Since 2020, he has been holding an appointment as professor of the department of genetics & biochemistry at Clemson University.

Clayton served as the associate director for undergraduate curriculum for the school of molecular & cellular biology (University of Illinois, 2002–2010), department head of biological and experimental psychology (Queen Mary University of London, 2012–2016) and has been the chair of the department of genetics & biochemistry at Clemson University since 2020.

== Research ==
Clayton's research has led to more than 100 peer-reviewed publications spanning the areas of neurobiological mechanisms, genomics, learning, and memory.

=== Neurobiology of learning and memory ===
Clayton has made contributions to the field of neurobiology of learning and memory by focusing on gene expression in the brain of songbirds, in particular the zebra finch. With Julia George, he identified genes involved in the development of the neural circuit for song production learning, one of which encodes the alpha-synuclein protein, a key player in Parkinson's and other neurodegenerative diseases. With Claudio V. Mello, he discovered that the sound of birdsong triggers expression and subsequent habituation in forebrain auditory centers of the immediate-early gene dubbed ZENK While exploring changes in the auditory forebrain during juvenile song learning, his work detected notable variations in gene expression between the early and mature phases and revealed that most genes that were stimulated by auditory cues in adults showed elevated expression levels in juveniles. His research on adult zebra finches revealed that they can quickly learn to recognize and differentiate songs without reinforcement. It was determined that zebra finches can retain newly learned songs within a day and just 3 hours of non-participatory exposure can create functional song memories. Additionally, the research indicated that song learning remains part of the daily routine of adult zebra finches, offering insight into the adaptability of the adult auditory system at a molecular and physiological level. It was also proposed that the recollection of a particular song encompasses elements beyond its acoustic characteristics.

=== Avian genomics ===
Clayton's research on gene expression in the songbird brain stimulated the sequencing of the zebra finch genome, the first bird after the chicken to be sequenced. This in turn has led to the ongoing identification of genetic changes that have occurred during the evolution of birds and has advanced the understanding of how these changes have influenced bird diversity and adaptation to different environments. Using genome-wide analysis techniques, he showed that many hundreds of genes are dynamically responsive during adult song recognition learning, including microRNAs that target genes controlling neuronal differentiation. With Julia George, he showed that social isolation causes rapid DNA methylation changes in a higher integrative center of the brain, implicating epigenetic mechanisms in processing of ongoing social experience. In collaboration with Claudio V. Mello, he assessed the benefits and challenges of using large-scale molecular techniques to study the neurobiology of songbirds, concluding that the utilization of comparative methodologies could potentially shed light on the evolutionary changes that have contributed to the social behavior, vocal learning, and other distinctive characteristics of songbirds that make them compelling subjects for scientific investigation.

== Awards and honors ==
- 1992 – Research Award, Whitehall Foundation
- 2005 – Elected Fellow, American Association for the Advancement of Science
- 2013 – Honorary Doctorate, University of Antwerp

=== Selected articles ===
- Mello, C., Vicario, D.S. and Clayton, D.F. (1992). Song presentation induces gene expression in the songbird forebrain. Proceedings of the National Academy of Sciences (USA) 89, 6818–6822.
- George, J. M., Jin, H., Woods, W. S., & Clayton, D. F. (1995). Characterization of a novel protein regulated during the critical period for song learning in the zebra finch. Neuron, 15(2), 361–372.
- Clayton, D.F. (2000). The Genomic Action Potential. Neurobiology of Learning and Memory 74:185–216.
- Rankin, C. H., Abrams, T., Barry, R. J., Bhatnagar, S., Clayton, D. F., Colombo, J., ... & Thompson, R. F. (2009). Habituation revisited: an updated and revised description of the behavioral characteristics of habituation. Neurobiology of learning and memory, 92(2), 135–138.
- Warren, W. C., Clayton, D. F., Ellegren, H., Arnold, A. P., Hillier, L. W., Künstner, A., ... & Wilson, R. K. (2010). The genome of a songbird. Nature, 464(7289), 757–762.
- Mariette M., Clayton, D.F. & Buchanan, K. (2021) Acoustic developmental programming: a mechanistic and evolutionary framework. Trends in Ecology and Evolution, 36 (8) 722–736
