= Mike Jones (athletic director) =

American athletic director and basketball coach

Biographical details
- Born: 1954 (age 71–72)
- Education: Mississippi College

Coaching career (HC unless noted)
- ?: Southern Miss (assistant)
- 19??–1988: Copiah–Lincoln
- 1988–2002: Mississippi College
- 2006–2008: Mississippi College
- 2019–2021: Mississippi College

Head coaching record
- Overall: 444–123 (college)

Accomplishments and honors

Awards
- GSC Coach of the Year (1994); 3× ASC Coach of the Year (1998, 1999, 2007); Mississippi Sports Hall of Fame (2018); Mississippi College Athletics Hall of Fame (2002)

Mike Jones (born 1954) is the former athletic director and men's basketball head coach for Mississippi College. The floor at A. E. Wood Coliseum is Mike Jones Court. He is a member of the school's athletics hall of fame and Mississippi's Sports hall of fame.
