= 1971 NCAA University Division cross country championships =

1971 cross-country running meet of the NCAA (University Division)

1971 NCAA University Division Cross Country Championships
- Organisers: NCAA
- Edition: 33rd
- Date: November 22, 1971
- Host city: Knoxville, TN; University of Tennessee
- Venue: Fox Den Country Club
- Distances: 6 miles (9.7 km)
- Participation: 285 athletes

The 1971 NCAA University Division Cross Country Championships were the 33rd annual cross country meet to determine the team and individual national champions of men's collegiate cross country running in the United States. Held on November 22, 1971, the meet was hosted by the University of Tennessee at the Fox Den Country Club in Knoxville, Tennessee. The distance for this race was 6 miles (9.7 kilometers).

All NCAA University Division members were eligible to qualify for the meet. In total, 17 teams and 285 individual runners contested this championship.

The team national championship was won by the Oregon Ducks, their first title. The individual championship was retained by Steve Prefontaine, from Oregon, with a time of 29:14.00, although he was unable to break his meet distance record from the previous year.

== Men's title ==
- Distance: 6 miles (9.7 kilometers)

=== Team Result (Top 10) ===
Rank	Team	Points
1st place, gold medalist(s)	Oregon	51
2nd place, silver medalist(s)	Washington State	77
3rd place, bronze medalist(s)	Penn	101
4	Villanova	122
5	Bowling Green	135
6	Wichita State	203
7	Miami (OH)	223
8	Michigan State	227
9	Air Force	256
10	Ball State	262

== See also ==
- NCAA Men's Division II Cross Country Championship
