= Joel Hitt =

American basketball and football player (1916–2003)

Personal information
- Born: December 30, 1916 Clinton, Mississippi, U.S.
- Died: June 2, 2003 (aged 86) Mobile, Alabama, U.S.
- Listed height: 6 ft 2 in (1.88 m)
- Listed weight: 180 lb (82 kg)

Career information
- College: Mississippi College (1936–1939)
- Position: Forward / center

Career history
- 1939–1940: Akron Goodyear Wingfoots

Joel Rueben Hitt Jr. (December 30, 1916 – June 2, 2003) was an American professional basketball and football player. He played in the National Basketball League for the Akron Goodyear Wingfoots during the 1939–40 season and averaged 0.7 points per game.

In football, he was selected in the 1939 NFL draft by the Cleveland Rams (13th round, 113th overall). He played for them in three games that season and accumulated 54 total yards of offense in his brief NFL career.
