= Frances Schaafsma =

Pioneer in women's sports and related collegiate athletics administration

Frances M. Schaafsma (May 4, 1934 − November 11, 1992) was a pioneer in women's sports in both basketball and volleyball, as well as a pioneer in collegiate athletics administration for female athletes. Her books on these two sports were among the first and best-known on the subjects. Women's Basketball, Physical Education Activities Series was published in 1966 and Basketball for Women was published in 1971. Volleyball for Coaches and Teachers was first published in 1974; a second edition was published in 1985. Volleyball, Exploring Sports Series was published in 1984.

Schaafsma became the women's basketball coach for Long Beach State in 1962. Beginning in 1965 when conference play began, she led the 49ers to 11 straight conference titles. In all, Schaafsma coached the team for 17 seasons, beginning with play in the Southern California Women's Conference, then the Extramural Coordinating Council of Southern California Colleges, the Southern California Women's Intercollegiate Athletic Conference, and finally the Western Collegiate Athletic Association.

Schaafsma's record at Long Beach was 209-73, including a final season mark in 1978-79 of 24-8. Schaafsma never had a losing season at Long Beach; in fact, the 49ers first losing season did not come until 1992-93, 2 years after her successor, Joan Bonvicini, left for the University of Arizona.

Schaasfma coached the women's volleyball team from 1962 through 1970. Her final team finished fourth in the AIAW Championships. She also coached golf at Long Beach and was interim director of athletics in 1983 and associate director of athletics in 1984-85.

Schaasfma was inducted into the Long Beach State Athletic Hall of Fame in 1986.
