= Sam M. Brinkley High School =

School in Jackson, Mississippi (1959–1969)

Location
- 3535 Abermarle Road, Jackson, Mississippi, U.S.
- Coordinates: 32.340344°N 90.204434°W

Information
- Other name: Brinkley High School
- Established: 1959
- Closed: December 1969
- School district: Jackson Public School District
- Mascot: Eagles

Sam M. Brinkley High School (1959–1969) also known as Brinkley High School, was a public high school in Jackson, Mississippi, U.S for African American students. It was open from 1959 until 1969.

== History ==
The city of Jackson had three high schools for African Americans during the Jim Crow era: Brinkley High School, Jim Hill High School and W. H. Lanier High School. During this time period Murrah High School, Central High School, Provine High School, and O. H. Wingfield High School were for white students.

The Sam M. Brinkley High School namesake, Samuel Manual Brinkley (1878–1946), was a teacher and principal at Jim Hill Public School in the 1920s, the first Black public school for the junior high school level. Brinkley worked in the Jackson Public School District for 29 years, retiring in 1941.

Students from Sam M. Brinkley High School were active within the civil rights movement starting in early 1960s. Notably, Tommie Watts Jr., a 17 year old student was arrested on July 6, 1961 for his participation in the Freedom Rides.

From 1959 until 1966, the campus was located at 3655 Livingston Road. In the fall of 1966, the school opened at a new campus in northwest Jackson, at 3535 Abermarle Road. The new campus at 3535 Abermarle Road sat on 16 acres (6.5 ha).

Orsmond Jordan served as the school's basketball coach, starting in 1967. Under Jordan's leadership in 1968–1969 the school won the Mississippi state high school basketball championship, amongst black schools.

== Closure and modern history ==
In December 1969, desegregation occurred at Sam M. Brinkley High School, and for the next two years the campus was used as a 10th-grade-only integrated school, before closing.

The school's former campus at 3655 Livingston Road was converted in 1966 into Powell Middle School. The school campus at 3535 Abermarle Road was later converted to Sam M. Brinkley Middle School (or simply Brinkley Middle School). Brinkley Middle School faced declining enrollment, and in July 2023, Brinkley Middle School was merged with W. H. Lanier High School, to form Lanier Junior Senior High School.

== Alumni ==
- Noland Smith, football player
