= Lanier Junior Senior High School =

Coordinates: 32°19′4″N 90°12′11″W

Location
- 833 West Maple Street; Jackson, Mississippi; United States

Information
- School type: Secondary
- Motto: "Enhancing Today's Minds to Lead Tomorrow's Future."
- Established: 1925
- School district: Jackson Public School District
- Superintendent: Cedric Gray
- Principal: MRS. STACEY WEBB BAILEY
- Staff: 72.37 (FTE)
- Enrollment: 863 (2023–2024)
- Student to teacher ratio: 11.92
- Colors: Maroon and white
- Mascot: Bulldog
- Feeder schools: Rowan Middle School
- Website: Official website

Lanier Junior Senior High School, formerly W. H. Lanier High School, is a public middle and high school located in Jackson, Mississippi, United States. It is part of the Jackson Public School District. The current principal is Valerie Bradley.

There were a total of 872 students enrolled in Lanier High, then only a high school, during the 2006–2007 school year. The gender makeup of the district was 52% female and 48% male. The racial makeup of the school is 100% African American.

== History ==
Lanier was founded in 1925 as a junior and senior high school. It was named after William Henry Lanier (1855–1929), who was superintendent of black schools in Jackson from 1912 until his death.

Due to educational segregation, Lanier was reserved for black students until 1969, when Jackson schools were integrated by law. The city of Jackson had three high schools for African Americans during the Jim Crow era: Sam M. Brinkley High School, Jim Hill High School and W. H. Lanier High School. During this time period Murrah High School, Central High School, Provine High School, and O. H. Wingfield High School were for white students.

In 2023, Brinkley Middle consolidated into Lanier High.

== Feeder pattern ==
The following schools fed into Lanier High School as of 2007.

- Middle schools
  - Brinkley Middle School
- Elementary schools
  - Dawson Elementary School
  - Galloway Elementary School
  - Johnson Elementary School
  - Smith Elementary School
  - Walton Elementary School

== Notable alumni ==
- Lerone Bennett Jr., author and social historian
- Monta Ellis, former NBA player
- Daryl Jones, (Democratic politician) in Miami, Florida
- Arvesta Kelly, ABA basketball player
- Gilbert Mason, family physician, civil rights leader, and author
- Richard Wright, renowned African-American author; attended Lanier but dropped out to earn money for his family
