= Mississippi Mr. Basketball =

Honor awarded to high school basketball players

Each year the Mississippi Mr. Basketball award is given to the best high school boys basketball player in the state of Mississippi by The Clarion-Ledger.

== Award winners ==
| Year | Player | High School | College | NBA draft |
|---|---|---|---|---|
| 2015 | Malik Newman (3) | Callaway HS, Jackson | Mississippi State/Kansas | |
| 2014 | Malik Newman (2) | Callaway HS, Jackson | Mississippi State/Kansas | |
| 2013 | Malik Newman | Callaway HS, Jackson | Mississippi State/Kansas | |
| 2012 | Devonta Pollard | Kemper County HS, De Kalb | Alabama, EMCC, Houston | |
| 2011 | Rodney Hood | Meridian HS, Meridian | Mississippi State, Duke | 2014 NBA draft: 1st Round, 23rd overall by the Utah Jazz |
| 2010 | Rashad Perkins | Starkville HS, Starkville | Chipola, MGCCC, Henderson State | |
| 2009 | Andre Stringer | Forest Hill HS, Jackson | LSU | |
| 2008 | Rashanti Harris | New Hope HS, Columbus | -- | |
| 2007 | R.L. Horton | Lanier HS, Jackson | Southern Miss | |
| 2006 | Ravern Johnson | Coahoma County HS, Clarksdale | Mississippi State | |
| 2005 | Monta Ellis | Lanier HS, Jackson | None | 2005 NBA draft: 2nd Round, 40th overall by the Golden State Warriors |
| 2004 | Al Jefferson | Prentiss HS, Prentiss | None | 2004 NBA draft: 1st Round, 15th overall by the Boston Celtics |
| 2003 | Charlie White | Provine HS, Jackson | Jackson State | |
| 2002 | Jackie Butler | McComb HS, McComb | None | |
| 2001 | Mo Williams | Murrah HS, Jackson | Alabama | 2003 NBA draft: 2nd Round, 47th overall by the Utah Jazz |
| 2000 | Timmy Bowers | Harrison Central HS, Gulfport | Mississippi State | |
| 1999 | Jonathan Bender | Picayune Memorial HS, Picayune | None | 1999 NBA draft: 1st Round, 5th overall by the Toronto Raptors |
| 1998 | David Sanders | Provine HS, Jackson | Ole Miss | |
| 1997 | Tang Hamilton | Lanier HS, Jackson | Mississippi State | |
| 1996 | Quentin Smith | Vicksburg HS, Vicksburg | Mississippi State, Southern Miss | |
| 1995 | Michael DeGruy | Harrison Central HS, Gulfport | Tallahassee CC, Henderson State | |
| 1994 | Jerry Nichols | Lanier HS, Jackson | Georgetown | |
| 1993 | Jesse Pate | Murrah HS, Jackson | Chipola Junior College, Arkansas | |
| 1992 | Othella Harrington (2) | Murrah HS, Jackson | Georgetown | 1996 NBA draft: 2nd Round, 30th overall by the Houston Rockets |
| 1991 | Othella Harrington | Murrah HS, Jackson | Georgetown | 1996 NBA draft: 2nd Round, 30th overall by the Houston Rockets |
| 1990 | Bernard Haslett | Vaiden HS, Vaiden | Southern Miss | |
| 1989 | James Robinson | Murrah HS, Jackson | Alabama | 1993 NBA draft: 1st Round, 21st overall by the Portland Trail Blazers |
| 1988 | Mahmoud Abdul-Rauf (2) | Gulfport HS, Gulfport | LSU | 1990 NBA draft: 1st Round, 3rd overall by the Denver Nuggets |
| 1987 | Mahmoud Abdul-Rauf | Gulfport HS, Gulfport | LSU | 1990 NBA draft: 1st Round, 3rd overall by the Denver Nuggets |
| 1986 | Steve Galloway | Murrah HS, Jackson | New Orleans | |
| 1985 | Kenny Payne | Northeast Jones, Laurel | Louisville | 1989 NBA draft: 1st Round, 19th overall by the Philadelphia 76ers |
| 1984 | Joe Coleman | Forest Hill HS, Jackson | Ole Miss | |
| 1983 | Todd McCaskill | Forest Hill HS, Jackson | Mississippi State | |
| 1982 | Todd McCaskill | Mendenhall HS, Mendenhall | | |
| 1981 | James Williams | Magee HS, Magee | | |
| 1980 | Charles Jones | East Kemper High School, Scooba | Louisville | 1984 NBA draft: 2nd Round, 36th overall by the Phoenix Suns |
| 1979 | Walter Mason | Horn Lake HS, Horn Lake | NWCC | |

=== Most winners by high school and college ===
| Number | High School |
|---|---|
| 7 | Murrah High School, Jackson |
| 4 | Lanier High School, Jackson |
| 3 | Callaway High School, Jackson |
| 3 | Forest Hill High School, Jackson |
| 2 | Gulfport High School, Gulfport |
| 2 | Harrison Central High School, Gulfport |
| 2 | Provine High School, Jackson |

| Number | College |
|---|---|
| 9 | Mississippi State |
| 3 | Alabama |
| 3 | LSU |
| 3 | Southern Miss |
| 2 | Georgetown |
| 2 | Henderson State |
| 2 | Louisville |
| 2 | Ole Miss |

== See also ==
Mississippi Miss Basketball
