= Murrah =

Murrah may refer to:

== Places ==
- Murrah, a hamlet in Cumbria, England, near Berrier
- Murrah High School, a public high school in Jackson, Mississippi, United States
- Murrah River, a river in New South Wales, Australia

== People ==
- Alfred P. Murrah (1904–1975), American attorney and judge
- Atikah bint Murrah (fl. 5th century CE), Hawazin heiress and ancestor of the Islamic prophet Muhammad
- Kilab ibn Murrah (born ca. 373 CE), ancestor of the Islamic prophet Muhammad
- Layla bint Abi Murrah al-Thaqafi (fl. 7th century CE), Islamic history figure
- Murrah ibn Ka'b (fl. 4th century CE), ancestor of the Islamic prophet Muhammad
- Pendleton Murrah (1824/1826–1865), American politician
- Roger Murrah (born 1946), American country musician and songwriter
- William Murrah (1900–1956), American football player
- William Belton Murrah (1852–1925), American bishop

== Other uses ==
- Al Murrah, a nomadic tribe of the Arabian peninsula
- Murrah buffalo, breed of water buffalo

== See also ==
- Alfred P. Murrah Federal Building, US federal government complex in downtown Oklahoma City, Oklahoma, target of the Oklahoma City bombing
