= Winifred Green =

American civil rights activist (1937–2016)

Winifred A. Green (1937 – February 6, 2016) was an American activist from Mississippi during the Civil Rights Movement. She spent her life leading grassroots movements impacting youth and education, and was a white advocate for integrated education beginning in 1960s Jackson, Mississippi, a time when few white Southerners were leaders in the Civil Rights Movement.

After a successful lawsuit, initiated by Medgar and Myrlie Evers, schools in several Mississippi districts, including Green's home of Jackson, were required to write desegregation plans for the 1964–1965 school year. A Mississippi Citizens' Council attempted to stop the integration by advocating for school closure rather than allowing black students to attend segregated white schools. In response to this, Green joined with other Southern whites from the Jackson area and formed Mississippians for Public Education to argue the importance for all children of keeping Mississippi schools open.

Green worked as a volunteer alongside lifelong friend Marian Wright Edelman with Freedom Summer a campaign begun in June 1964 to attempt to register as many African-American voters as possible in Mississippi.

Green helped found the Southern Rural Black Women's Initiative in 2002 and served on its executive committee, an organization formed to help rural poor women of the American South. She served on the board of directors of the Children's Defense Fund, an organization founded by Marian Wright Edelman. She worked with the American Friends Service Committee. She was a graduate of Millsaps College where she met Patt Derian and began her lifelong career as a Civil Rights activist. Green died at the age of 78 on February 6, 2016, in New Orleans, Louisiana.
