= Clay Lee =

Clay Lee is the name of:

- Clay Lee, realtor and contestant on The Apprentice (U.S. Season 4)'
- Clay Foster Lee, Jr. (b. 1930), retired American Bishop of the United Methodist Church
