= Sephus =

Sephus is a surname. Notable people with the surname include:

- John Sephus Mack (1880–1940), American businessperson and philanthropist
- Nashlie Sephus, American computer engineer and entrepreneur
