= James Bowley =

James Bowley may refer to:

- James E. Bowley, American professor of religious studies
- James A. Bowley (c. 1844–1891), judge, politician, and newspaper publisher from South Carolina
