= Murrah High School =

Public high school in Jackson, Mississippi, United States

Coordinates: 32°19′33″N 90°10′11″W

Location
- 1400 Murrah Drive; Jackson, Mississippi 39202; United States

Information
- Type: Public
- Motto: "The only place to be"
- Established: 1954
- School district: Jackson Public School District
- Principal: Dr. Bradley Dean Blake
- Teaching staff: 79.93 (FTE)
- Grades: 9–12
- Enrollment: 1,259 (2024–25)
- Student to teacher ratio: 15.75
- Campus type: Urban
- Colors: Royal blue and silver
- Athletics: Mississippi High School Activities Association
- Mascot: Mustangs
- Yearbook: The Resumé
- Literary magazine: Pleiades
- Namesake: William Belton Murrah
- Website: www.jackson.k12.ms.us/Murrah

Murrah High School is a public high school in Jackson, Mississippi, United States. Operated by the Jackson Public School District (JPS), it opened in 1954 and is named for William Belton Murrah, the first president of Millsaps College and a bishop of the Methodist Episcopal Church, South. The school enrolled 1,259 students in grades 9 through 12 in 2024–25 and is the high school campus of the Academic and Performing Arts Complex (APAC), the district's selective program for academically and artistically advanced students, whose upper-level classes are taught as Advanced Placement courses.

Murrah has received a B in Mississippi's A–F accountability system in each year since 2022–23, with growth in mathematics above the state average. Its basketball teams have won fifteen state championships, and coach Anna Jackson's nine girls' titles are a state record for a girls' basketball coach. Its alumni include Pulitzer Prize–winning playwright Beth Henley, novelist Kathryn Stockett, film director Tate Taylor, jazz singer Cassandra Wilson, former Netscape chief executive Jim Barksdale, federal appellate judge Rhesa Barksdale, computer engineer Nashlie Sephus and several National Basketball Association players, among them Mo Williams and Othella Harrington.

== History ==
=== Founding ===
William Belton Murrah, the school's namesake, in 1905

Murrah High School was built in 1954 at 1400 Murrah Drive. The building was designed by a joint venture of the architects Jones & Haas and Jay Tunis Liddle Jr. and built by the M. T. Reed Construction Company in the International and Modern styles. The school takes its name from William Belton Murrah (1852–1925), a native of Pickensville, Alabama, who served as the first president of Millsaps College from 1890 to 1910 and was elected a bishop of the Methodist Episcopal Church, South, in 1910. The school's literary and visual arts magazine, Pleiades, was also founded in 1954.

=== Early decades ===
Murrah opened as a school for white students, and it remained segregated for more than a decade after the U.S. Supreme Court's 1954 ruling in Brown v. Board of Education. In 1961 the football team, coached by Jack Carlisle, who was later inducted into the Mississippi Sports Hall of Fame for a coaching career that spanned sixty years, went undefeated in the regular season and played Laurel for the Big Eight Conference championship. Its running back, Mike Dennis, was named the Big Eight Conference's Player of the Year; he went on to become a two-time All-SEC selection at the University of Mississippi, the eighth pick of the American Football League draft and a player for the Los Angeles Rams. The team's manager, Rhesa Barksdale, later became a judge of the United States Court of Appeals for the Fifth Circuit. Among the school's graduates of the period was the playwright Beth Henley, who finished at Murrah in 1970 and later won the Pulitzer Prize for Drama.

=== Desegregation ===
Federal courts ordered the Jackson schools desegregated in Singleton v. Jackson Municipal Separate School District, a case filed in 1963 by Black students and their families. After the Supreme Court required immediate desegregation in January 1970, the district's schools reopened on a desegregated basis on February 1, 1970. By March 1970 Murrah enrolled 180 Black students among 1,044, and by that fall its enrollment was 44 percent Black; the school was paired with the historically Black Brinkley High School. Among the students who came to Murrah from Brinkley was Robert Gibbs, later a Mississippi circuit judge, who recalled that Murrah's teachers "were surprised at how smart and how bright and how advanced we were." The same year, Orsmond Jordan Jr. became the boys' basketball coach, beginning a 24-year tenure that produced the school's first three state championships. As white enrollment in the district declined over the following years, Murrah's student body became predominantly Black.

Members of the class of 1973, whose entire high school careers took place under the court-ordered plan, later collected more than fifty oral histories of students and teachers in Lines Were Drawn: Remembering Court-Ordered Integration at a Mississippi High School, published by the University Press of Mississippi in 2016. A review in The Journal of Southern History called the book "a fascinating group memoir". A federal court declared the district a unitary system and dismissed the Singleton case in 1981.

=== Late 20th century ===
Jordan's teams won state championships in 1986, 1991 and 1992, the last two featuring future professional players Othella Harrington and Ronnie Henderson. Anna Jackson became girls' basketball coach in 1983; her teams won state titles in 1991 and in each year from 1998 through 2000. In 1992 UMMC launched the Base Pair research mentorship program with nine Murrah seniors.

=== 21st century ===
From 2002 through 2009 the girls' basketball team won five more state championships, adding a tenth in 2016, and the boys won titles in 2005 and 2013. The school has received a B rating from the Mississippi Department of Education in each year since 2022–23. In 2024 the editor of Pleiades was named one of five National Student Poets, the first from Mississippi, and in 2026 a Murrah senior became the first JPS student named Overall Top Individual Performer at the MHSAA state speech and debate tournament.

== Campus and organization ==
Murrah occupies its original campus at 1400 Murrah Drive, near the center of Jackson and not far from the Mississippi State Capitol. The main building, completed in 1954, is a two-story, flat-roofed structure in the International and Modern styles. It was designed by a joint venture of the architects Jones & Haas and Jay Tunis Liddle Jr., built by the M. T. Reed Construction Company, and is recorded in the Mississippi Department of Archives and History's Historic Resources Inventory.

The campus adjoins the University of Mississippi Medical Center, a proximity that shaped the school's academic life: UMMC's Base Pair research mentorship program began in 1992 with nine Murrah seniors, and Murrah students have since worked in the medical center's laboratories alongside its faculty researchers. Murrah is also the high school campus of the district's APAC program, whose middle school site is Bailey APAC Middle School.

Murrah is one of six high schools in JPS. It is led by principal Bradley Dean Blake. Students are organized into four grade-level academies (the Freshman, Sophomore, Junior and Senior Academies), each directed by its own academy principal, and two deans of students oversee the freshman–sophomore and junior–senior grades.

== Academics ==
=== Academic and Performing Arts Complex (APAC) ===
The Academic and Performing Arts Complex (APAC) is the Jackson Public School District's program for students who are strong academic achievers or who show aptitude in the visual or performing arts. Students enter through an annual application process held in the fall and winter for the following school year, and the district provides transportation to all students admitted to the program. Murrah is the high school site of the program's academic division, which begins at Power APAC Elementary in grades 4 and 5 and continues at Bailey APAC Middle School in grades 6 through 8.

The academic division is an accelerated program of study in language arts, mathematics, science and social studies designed to prepare students for college-level coursework. Admission to the high school program requires scores in the high proficient or advanced range on state assessments, a grade average of at least 80 in two or more core subjects, and a passing score on an entrance examination given each November, and students must maintain those standards to remain in the program. Cooperative learning and higher-order thinking skills are emphasized, and students use materials above their grade level. Participation carries a sustained workload of daily homework, long-term projects, regular writing assignments and extensive summer reading. In grades 10 through 12, APAC classes become Advanced Placement courses for which students may earn college credit. Seniors who meet the program's criteria in either the academic or the visual and performing arts division graduate as APAC Graduates and wear a special insignia on their Murrah graduation stoles.

The visual and performing arts division is a pre-professional program, taught by artist-teachers at the Power APAC site, that follows a written, sequential curriculum based on the National Standards for the Arts and the Mississippi Visual and Performing Arts Framework. Admission is by application and audition. Over nine years, from grade 4 through grade 12, students study dance (ballet, modern and jazz), music (piano, instrumental and vocal), theatre arts (performance and technical) and the visual arts (drawing, design, ceramics, sculpture, painting, printmaking and photography), with Advanced Placement courses offered in music and visual arts. The division's stated aim is to prepare twelfth-grade students to audition successfully for university programs, apprenticeships or professional work in their chosen discipline.

=== Advanced Placement and academic honors ===
In the 2005–06 school year the Siemens Foundation named Murrah Mississippi's recipient of the Siemens Award for Advanced Placement, which went to one high school in each state, and 38 Murrah students earned AP Scholar honors for scoring 3 or higher on at least three AP exams. That year Newsweek ranked Murrah No. 503 on its list of 1,000 U.S. high schools that best prepare students for college, a ranking based on the number of Advanced Placement and International Baccalaureate exams taken per graduating senior. In 2024–25 the school offered 20 AP courses and more than 160 students took at least one AP exam; three members of the class of 2025 earned the AP Capstone Diploma and five earned the AP Seminar and Research Certificate.

In the 2005–06 National Merit Scholarship Program, eight Murrah students were named National Merit or National Achievement Semifinalists and four advanced to finalist; six of the 19 National Achievement Semifinalists in Mississippi that year attended Murrah. Three Murrah seniors were National Merit Semifinalists in the 2018 program, and in 2025 a Murrah senior received a National Merit $2,500 Scholarship, one of 2,500 awarded nationally from a pool of more than 15,000 finalists.

=== Base Pair ===
JPS is a partner with the University of Mississippi Medical Center in the Base Pair research mentorship program, which was funded by the Howard Hughes Medical Institute. The program matches high school students with UMMC faculty members for in-depth experiences in the sciences. It was planned in 1991–92 and began in the 1992–93 school year with nine Murrah seniors; the Howard Hughes Medical Institute funded it through its Precollege Science Education program from 1994 to 2012. Students can earn up to two Carnegie units of credit through the program.

By 2015 the program had brought approximately $1.3 million for science education into the district, Base Pair–trained students were authors on more than five dozen published scientific papers or abstracts, and twenty-five Base Pair graduates were in post-baccalaureate programs, including twelve in M.D., M.D./Ph.D., Ph.D. (science) or master's degree programs in science. A 2020 study of the program's first 28 years, published in the Journal of STEM Outreach, reported that 232 students had taken part and 220 had graduated from the program. Participants had a 100 percent high school graduation rate and an estimated college entry rate above 99 percent, compared with 73 percent for Mississippi as a whole, and roughly 63 percent of graduates had gone on to post-baccalaureate training. At least 84 had earned advanced degrees: 26 in medicine, veterinary medicine or pharmacy, 15 Ph.D.s, 8 law degrees and 35 master's degrees. Base Pair students had authored or presented more than 425 scientific documents, 20 of them as full manuscripts in peer-reviewed journals, and five graduates had become faculty members at UMMC, including one who serves as assistant dean for admissions for the UMMC School of Medicine.

=== SOAR ===
The Student Oriented Academic Research (SOAR) program is a companion to the Base Pair program at Murrah High School. SOAR was developed to implement advanced science research activities for JPS students outside of the UMMC zone. In this program, students are enrolled in Biology II during their junior year and other advanced life science courses during their senior year. The SOAR program supports advanced biomedical and forensic science laboratory research by students at each high school site.

=== Accountability ratings ===
School year	Grade
2022–23	B
2023–24	B
2024–25	B

Mississippi assigns schools A–F letter grades based on state test results, student growth, graduation rates, and measures of college and career readiness.

Murrah has received a B in each year since 2022–23, and its accountability score rose from 684 points in 2022–23 to 707 in 2023–24. The school's strongest results have come in student growth and accelerated coursework. In 2023–24 Murrah earned 87.2 percent of the available points for growth in mathematics and all of the points for mathematics growth among its lowest-performing quarter of students, above state averages of 73.6 and 67.0 percent, and its four-year graduation rate of 90.3 percent was above the state rate. In 2024–25 it again exceeded the state in mathematics growth (79.0 percent, against 67.9 percent statewide) and in growth among its lowest-performing students (99.3 percent, against 55.4 percent), scored 74.3 percent on the state's measure of participation and performance in accelerated courses (state: 71.2 percent), and raised the share of its students scoring proficient or advanced in mathematics from 46.5 to 51.2 percent.

== Student life ==
=== Student body ===
Student body composition, 2024–25
Race and ethnicity	Total
Black	95.3%
White	2.0%
Hispanic	1.9%
Two or more races	0.7%
Asian	0.1%

In the 2024–25 school year Murrah enrolled 1,259 students, 628 male and 631 female, taught by 79.93 full-time-equivalent teachers for a student–teacher ratio of 15.75. Black students made up 95.3 percent of enrollment, and nearly all students (1,258) were eligible for free lunch.

=== Activities ===
==== Speech and debate ====
Murrah's speech and debate team competes in Mississippi High School Activities Association (MHSAA) tournaments and at the national level. In 2022 a Murrah sophomore won the MHSAA state championship in storytelling, and team members competed that year at the national tournaments of the National Catholic Forensic League and the National Speech and Debate Association. In 2026 a Murrah senior won the state title in impromptu speaking and was named the tournament's Overall Top Individual Performer, the first JPS student to receive the honor.

==== Music ====
The Murrah Singers, the school's concert choir, grew from about 15 to 20 members to an average of 70 to 80 under director Pierrdro Gallion and performed across the United States and abroad. In 2018 the choir released a recording, Mighty & Joyful, made at St. Philip's Episcopal Church in Jackson, with a repertoire ranging from Mozart and Mendelssohn to Kirk Franklin and Eric Whitacre. The school's marching band is known as the Sound of Perfection.

==== Publications ====
Pleiades, Murrah's literary and visual arts magazine, was founded in 1954. After a hiatus around the turn of the 21st century, students revived it in 2012. The Mississippi Scholastic Press Association has named it the state's best literary magazine in three years, and in 2024 its editor was selected as one of five National Student Poets, the program's first honoree from Mississippi. In 2020 the class of 1970 endowed the magazine through a fund at the Community Foundation for Mississippi.

=== Athletics ===
Murrah fields fourteen varsity teams in the Mississippi High School Activities Association (MHSAA): baseball, football, softball and girls' volleyball, and boys' and girls' teams in basketball, cross country, golf, soccer and tennis. The school's teams are known as the Mustangs, and its colors are royal blue and silver.

Murrah has won fifteen MHSAA state championships in basketball. The boys' team won Class 5A titles in 1986, 1991, 1992 and 2005 and the Class 6A title in 2013, and finished as state runner-up in 1988, 2000, 2017 and 2020; Orsmond Jordan, head coach from 1970 to 1994, led the first three championship teams, including the 1986 team that finished 41–1. The girls' team has won ten titles: nine in Class 5A under Anna Jackson, head coach from 1983, in 1991, 1998, 1999, 2000, 2002, 2003, 2007, 2008 and 2009, and a tenth in Class 6A in 2016 under Tangela Banks, who led Murrah past Callaway 54–52 in double overtime. The 2009 team also won the Grand Slam, a postseason tournament among the champions of different classifications. Jackson's nine state titles are a record for a Mississippi girls' basketball coach; when she was inducted into the Mississippi Sports Hall of Fame in 2018, her teams had won 692 games and lost 167.

The program has produced a number of professional players. Othella Harrington and Ronnie Henderson played on the 1991 and 1992 championship teams, and LaSondra Barrett led the girls' champions of 2007 and 2008. An incomplete survey of sixty recent NBA players with Mississippi roots, published in the Mississippi Encyclopedia, found that at least four had attended Murrah. In football, the 1961 team coached by Jack Carlisle went undefeated in the regular season before losing to Laurel in the Big Eight championship game.

== Notable alumni ==
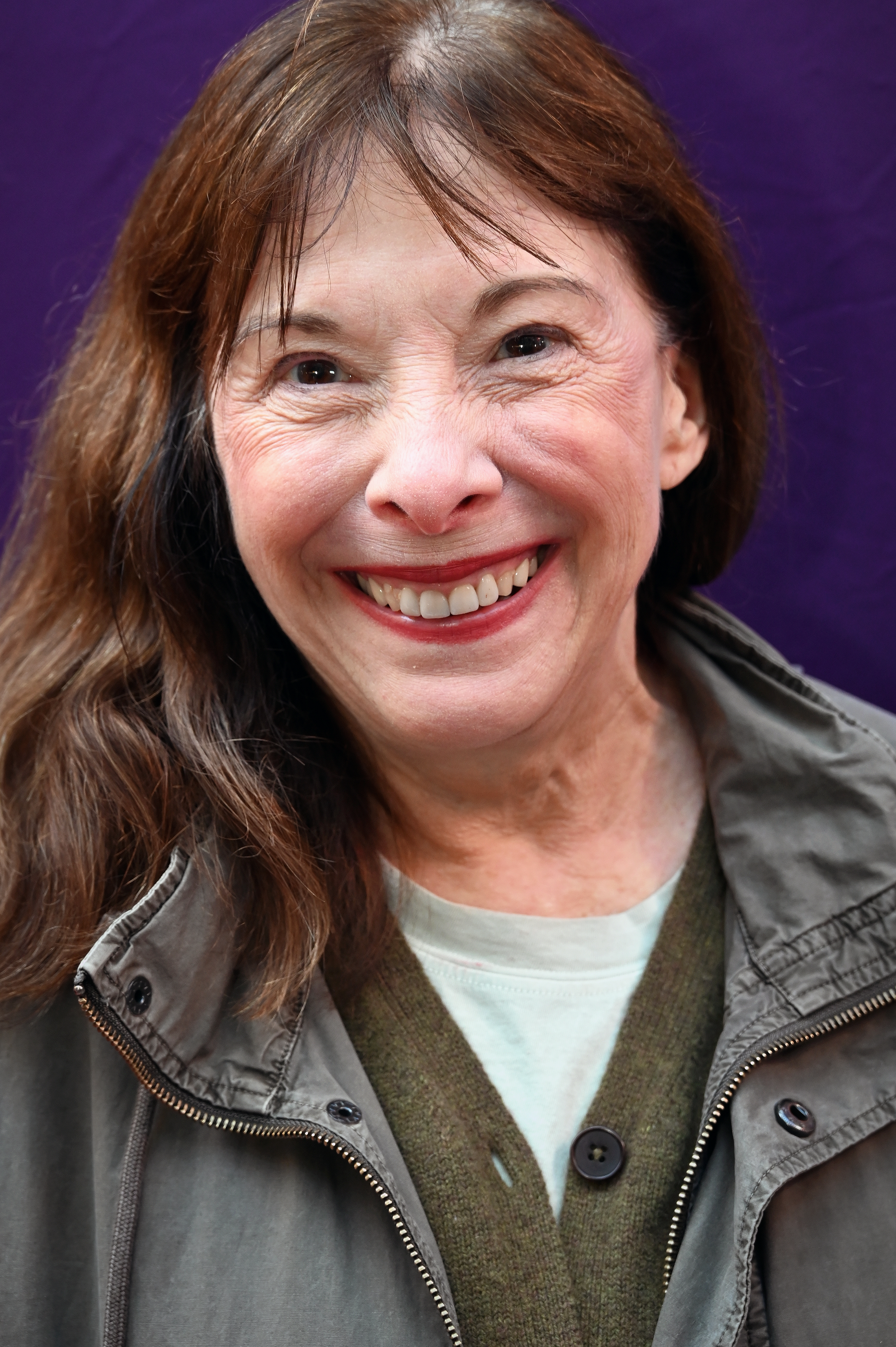
Beth Henley, playwright

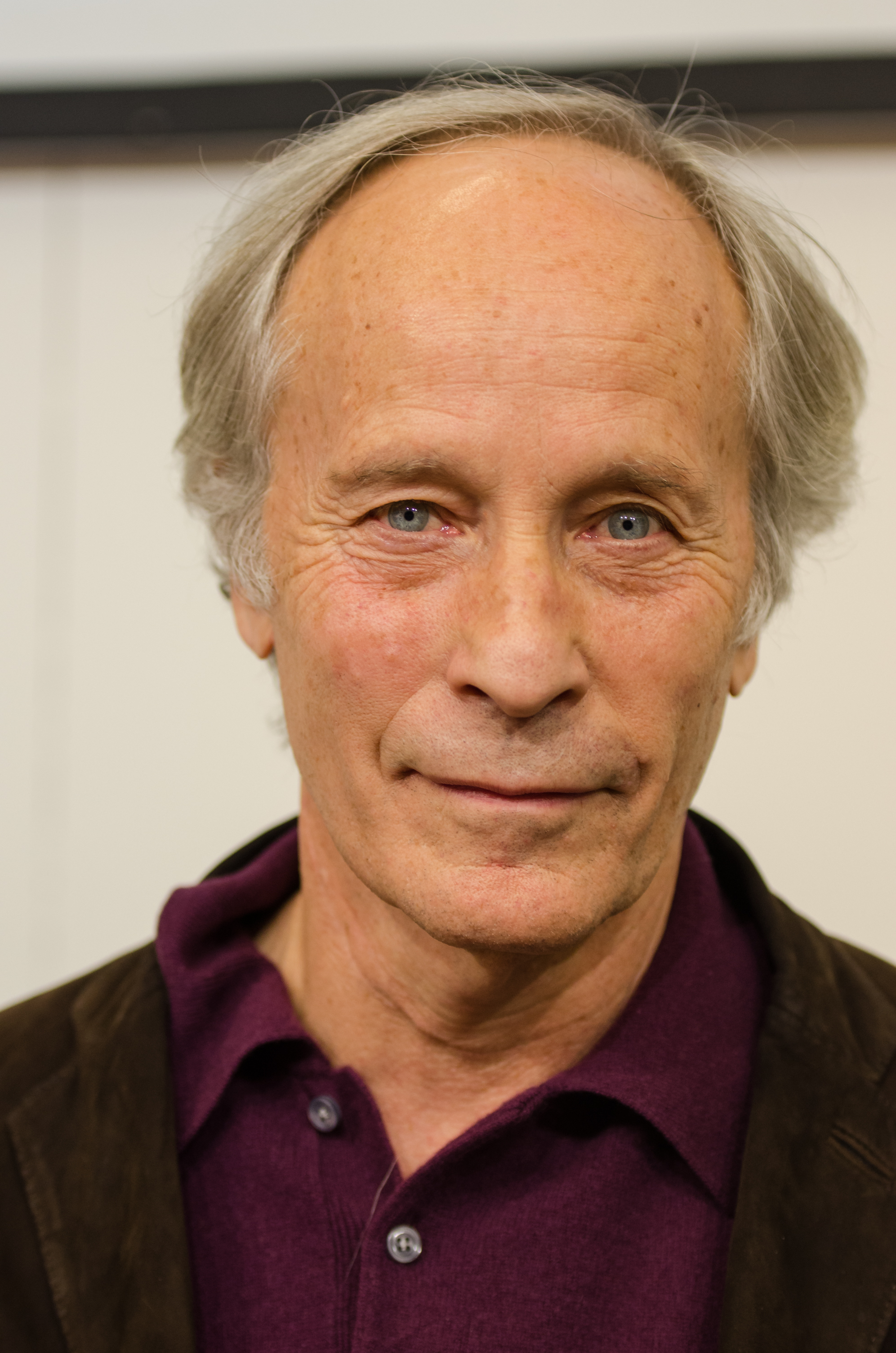
Richard Ford, novelist

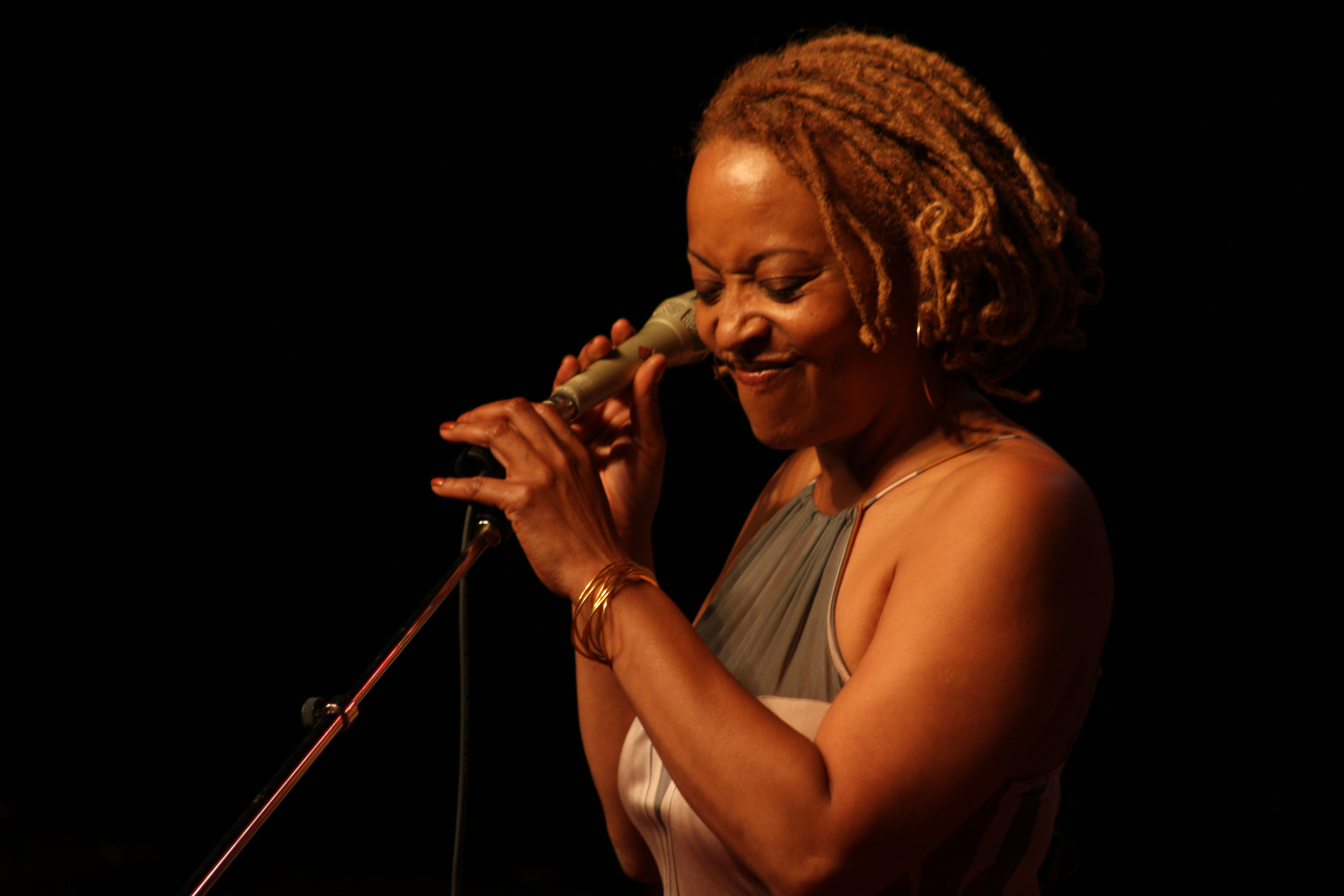
Cassandra Wilson, jazz singer

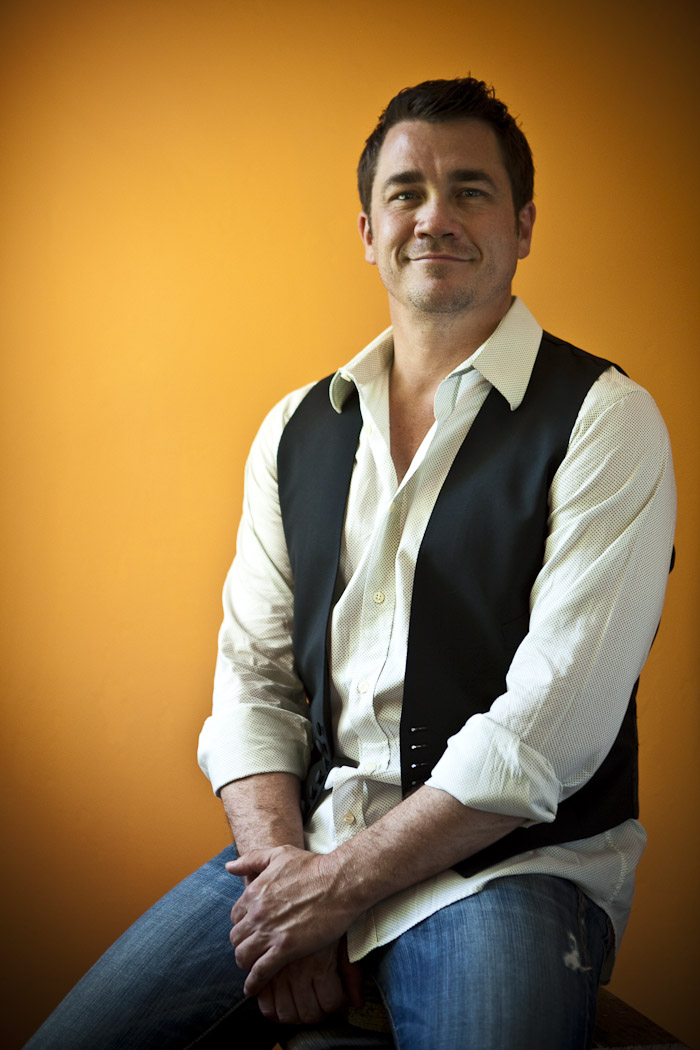
Tate Taylor, film director

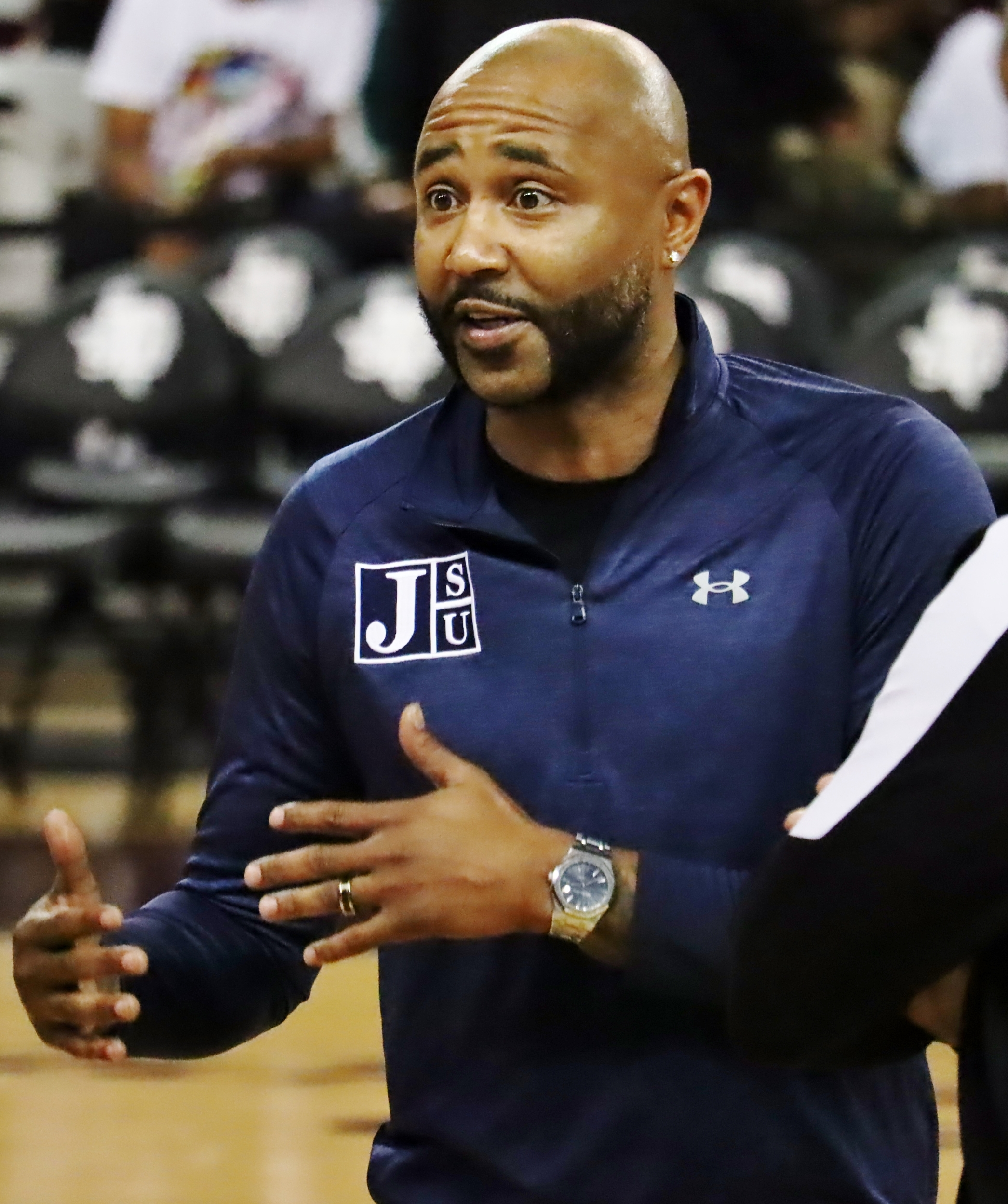
Mo Williams, basketball player

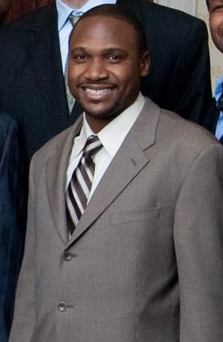
Lindsey Hunter, basketball player

=== Arts and entertainment ===
- Derek Blanks, photographer and creative director
- Richard Ford, Pulitzer Prize–winning novelist
- Beth Henley, Pulitzer Prize–winning playwright
- Alan Huffman, author and co-editor of Lines Were Drawn
- Kathryn Stockett, novelist, author of The Help
- Tate Taylor, film director
- Carson Whitsett, keyboardist and songwriter
- Tim Whitsett, music publisher, producer and author
- Cassandra Wilson, jazz singer

=== Business, science and technology ===
- Jim Barksdale, business executive and former chief executive of Netscape
- Charlie Hughes, audio engineer and inventor
- Nashlie Sephus, computer engineer and entrepreneur

=== Government and law ===
- Rhesa Barksdale, judge of the U.S. Court of Appeals for the Fifth Circuit
- Martha Bergmark, civil rights lawyer and legal aid advocate
- Ronnie Crudup Jr., member of the Mississippi House of Representatives
- Dale Danks, mayor of Jackson from 1977 to 1989
- Justis Gibbs, member of the Mississippi House of Representatives
- Pete Johnson, State Auditor of Mississippi
- Cy Rosenblatt, member of the Mississippi State Senate
- Bill Waller Jr., chief justice of the Supreme Court of Mississippi

=== Sports ===
- LaSondra Barrett, professional basketball player
- Mike Dennis, professional football player
- Hap Farber, professional football player
- Curt Ford, professional baseball player
- Antonio Gibson, professional football player
- Othella Harrington, professional basketball player
- Ronnie Henderson, professional basketball player
- Lindsey Hunter, professional basketball player and coach
- George Ivory, college basketball coach
- Trey Johnson, professional basketball player and coach
- Ryan Lorthridge, professional basketball player
- Navonda Moore, professional basketball player
- Alyssa Pennington, soccer referee and the first FIFA referee from Mississippi
- Tomekia Reed, college basketball coach
- James Robinson, professional basketball player
- LaQuinton Ross, professional basketball player
- Mo Williams, professional basketball player and coach
