= Tommy Kelly (American football) =

American football player (born 1980)

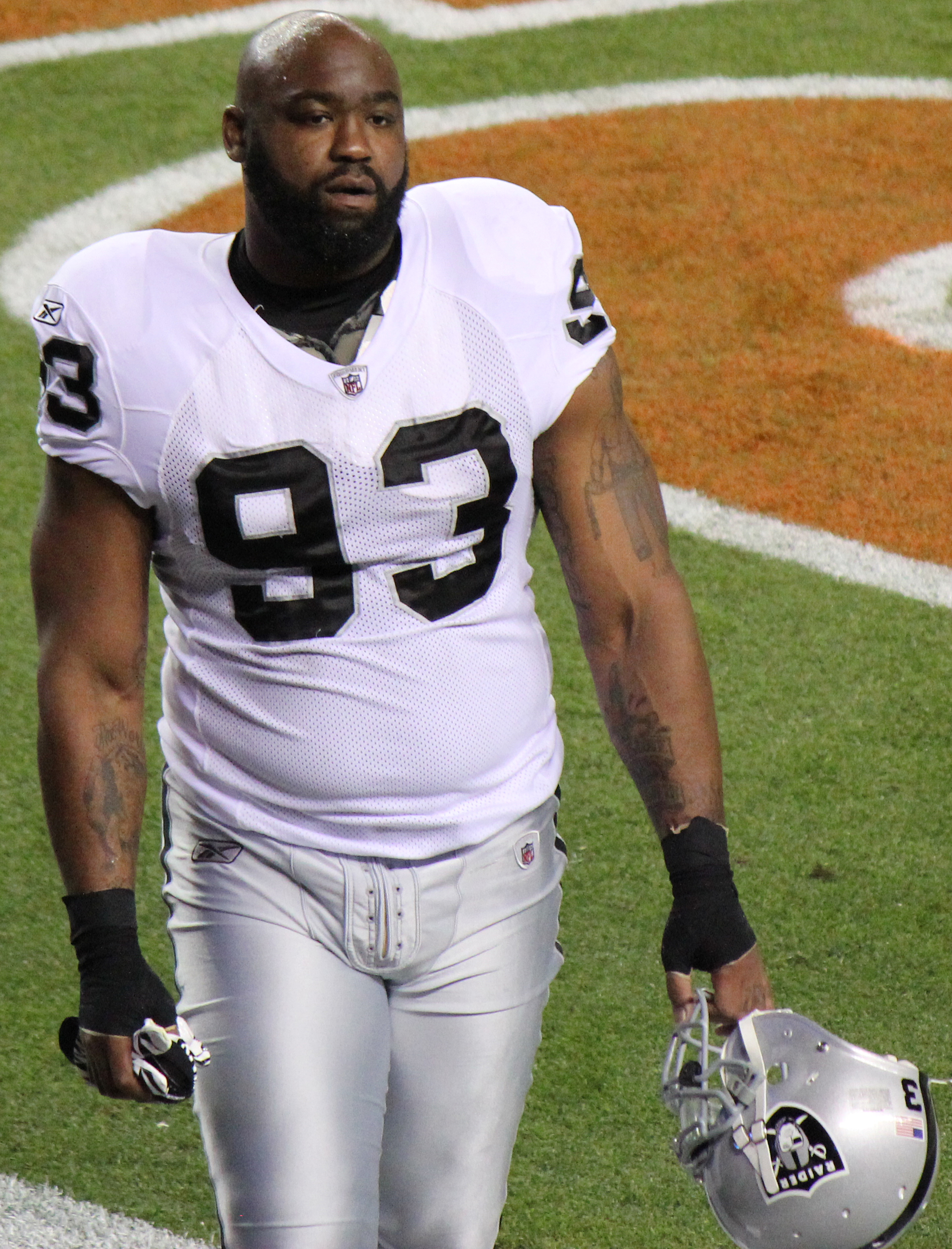
- Kelly with the Oakland Raiders in 2011

No. 93, 95
- Position: Defensive tackle

Personal information
- Born: December 27, 1980 (age 45); Jackson, Mississippi, U.S.
- Listed height: 6 ft 6 in (1.98 m)
- Listed weight: 310 lb (141 kg)

Career information
- High school: Provine (Jackson)
- College: Mississippi State
- NFL draft: 2004: undrafted

Career history
- Oakland Raiders (2004–2012); New England Patriots (2013); Arizona Cardinals (2014)

Career NFL statistics
- Total tackles: 479
- Sacks: 38
- Forced fumbles: 10
- Fumble recoveries: 4
- Interceptions: 1
- Stats at Pro Football Reference

Tommy Terrell Kelly (born December 27, 1980) is an American former professional football player who was a defensive tackle in the National Football League (NFL). He played college football for the Mississippi State Bulldogs and was signed by the Oakland Raiders as an undrafted free agent in 2004. He played with the Raiders and subsequently a single season each with the New England Patriots and Arizona Cardinals before retiring prior to the 2015 season.

== Early life ==
After a standout basketball career at Jackson's Provine High School, he signed a football scholarship with Mississippi State University, where he played in 22 games and earned 16 starts, making 82 tackles, including 15 for loss and two quarterback sacks. He was signed as a free agent in 2004 by the Oakland Raiders.

== Professional career ==
=== Oakland Raiders ===
==== 2004 season ====
After being signed in 2004 by the Oakland Raiders as an undrafted rookie free agent, Tommy Kelly alternated between 3–4 DE and 4–3 DT. In the very few plays that he saw action, he was able to rack up four sacks, including 3 weeks in a row from week 7 through week 9.

==== 2005 season ====
In 2005, the Raiders moved away from the 3–4 defense, with Kelly finding a spot as the RE. In week 9 alone, Kelly racked up a total of 3 quarterback sacks—reaching Kansas City veteran Trent Green. In each instance, Kelly had lined up as a DT rather than the RE that he had been playing as previously in the year. By the end of the season, Kelly had a total of 4.5 sacks.

==== 2006 season ====
Tommy Kelly appeared in all sixteen games and had a total of 3.5 sacks.

==== 2007 season ====
Kelly played in 7 games in 2007, recording 30 tackles and 1 sack before suffering a season ending knee injury while playing against the Tennessee Titans. He was placed on injured reserve by the Oakland Raiders on October 31, 2007.

==== 2008 season ====
On February 28, 2008, the Oakland Raiders signed Kelly to the largest contract ever given to a defensive tackle on the eve of free agency. Kelly, a defensive end moving to defensive tackle in 2008, signed a seven-year, $50.5 million contract with $18.125 million in guarantees and $25.125 million in the first three years.

Kelly can play every spot on the defensive line, but he replaced the retired Warren Sapp at the three technique for the 2008 NFL season.

On September 14, 2008, Kelly was arrested for suspicion of driving under the influence. Kelly finished the 2008 season with 55 tackles (31 solo) and 4.5 sacks matching his career high set in 2005.

==== 2009 season ====
Kelly finished the season with just 55 tackles again (37 solo) and a career low 1 sack.

At the end of the season, Kelly had 60 tackles and 7 sacks and was named as an alternate for the 2010 Pro Bowl.

==== 2011 season ====
On opening day of the 2011 NFL season, still at right defensive tackle next to Richard Seymour, he recorded 2 tackles and a sack as the Raiders defeated the Denver Broncos. In week 10, he recorded 3 tackles, a game-ending sack and a forced fumble as the Raiders beat the San Diego Chargers. The next week, when the Raiders won against the Minnesota Vikings, he recorded 3 tackles, two sacks and an interception off of a deflected pass.

On March 27, 2013, Kelly was released from the Oakland Raiders making him a free agent.

=== New England Patriots ===
On April 8, 2013, Kelly agreed to a two-year deal with the New England Patriots.

Defensive tackle Tommy Kelly was placed on injured reserve following Week 8 of the 2013 NFL season which ended his season. The Patriots released Kelly on August 24, 2014.

=== Arizona Cardinals ===
Kelly signed with the Arizona Cardinals on August 27, 2014. He retired prior to the beginning of the 2015 season.

=== Career statistics ===
Year	Team	GP	COMB	TOTAL	AST	SACK	FF	FR	FR YDS	INT	IR YDS	AVG IR	LNG	TD	PD
2004	OAK	10	20	16	4	4.0	3	1	0	0	0	0	0	0	1
2005	OAK	16	45	35	10	4.5	3	0	0	0	0	0	0	0	1
2006	OAK	16	68	53	15	3.5	1	0	0	0	0	0	0	0	3
2007	OAK	7	30	27	3	1.0	0	0	0	0	0	0	0	0	1
2008	OAK	16	55	31	24	4.5	0	0	0	0	0	0	0	0	0
2009	OAK	16	55	37	18	1.0	0	0	0	0	0	0	0	0	2
2010	OAK	16	60	38	22	7.0	0	0	0	0	0	0	0	0	1
2011	OAK	16	41	27	14	7.5	2	1	0	1	1	1	1	0	5
2012	OAK	16	45	25	20	1.0	0	1	0	0	0	0	0	0	2
2013	NE	5	22	12	10	2.5	0	1	0	0	0	0	0	0	0
2014	ARI	16	33	23	11	1	0	0	0	0	0	0	0	0	0
Total	Total	150	474	324	151	37.5	9	4	0	1	1	1	1	0	18

== Coaching career ==
On July 21, 2017, Kelly was hired by the Arizona Cardinals as a coaching intern.

== Personal life ==
Kelly now lives in Jackson, Mississippi.
