= Andre Stringer =

American basketball player (born 1991)

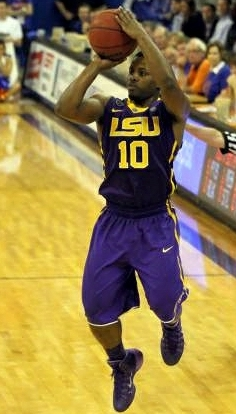
- Stringer shooting for LSU in 2014

Personal information
- Born: December 4, 1991 (age 34) Atlanta, Georgia, U.S.
- Listed height: 5 ft 10 in (1.78 m)
- Listed weight: 190 lb (86 kg)

Career information
- High school: Forest Hill (Jackson, MS)
- College: LSU (2010–2014)
- NBA draft: 2014: undrafted
- Playing career: 2014–present
- Position: Point guard

Career history
- 2014–2016: Maine Red Claws
- 2016–2017: Tampereen Pyrintö
- 2017–2018: Island Storm

Career highlights
- Mississippi Mr. Basketball (2009)

Andre Stringer (born December 4, 1991) is an American professional basketball player who last played for the Island Storm of the NBL Canada. He played college basketball for LSU.

== High school career ==
Stringer's brother Micheal Stringer played college basketball at Richmond. Stringer attended Forest Hill High School in Jackson, Mississippi. In his career he scored over 2,400 points and was named the Gatorade Player of the Year twice in Mississippi. He was named Mississippi Mr. Basketball in 2010. Stringer joined Jalen Courtney, Ralston Turner and Matt Derenbecker in LSU coach Trent Johnson's first recruiting class.

== College career ==
As a freshman, Stringer averaged 15.2 points per game through the first 10 games. He became well known for hitting long range threes from behind the NBA line, an adaption to his lack of height. Stringer used his quickness to split defenders on double teams and led the team in assists. However, he missed double digit scoring in seven of LSU's last 10 games as a freshman. Stringer recorded 18 points, four assists and three steals in an 80–67 win over Chattanooga on December 20, 2012, after Anthony Hickey was suspended. As a junior, he averaged 10.9 points per game. Stringer made 40.9% of his three-pointers as a junior and developed as an on-ball defender. He averaged 11.8 points and 2.6 assists per game as a senior and led the team to a NIT appearance. He finished his LSU career in the top three in 3-pointers made, the top-10 in assists and top 20 in steals. Stringer scored 1,365 career points for the Tigers.

== Professional career ==
After going undrafted, Stringer joined the Maine Red Claws of the NBA D-League in tryout camp after impressing coach Scott Morrison with his shooting. In one game he made two half court shots. He averaged 7.7 points and 2.6 assists in his first season. He signed with the Polish team Start Lublin in 2015 but did not have a physical exam and returned to the Red Claws without playing for the team. In his second season with the Red Claws, he averaged 7.5 points, 3.9 assists, and 2.3 rebounds per game. Stringer signed with the Finnish team Tampereen Pyrintö in November 2016. After his Finnish experience, Stringer joined the Island Storm of the NBL Canada and played well in his first few games. He suffered an elbow injury but averaged 16 points, five assists and three rebounds per game in his first season with the Storm. On February 21, 2018, he ruptured his Achilles tendon and missed the rest of the season.
