= James Robinson (basketball, born 1970) =

American basketball player (born 1970)

Personal information
- Born: August 31, 1970 (age 56) Jackson, Mississippi, U.S.
- Listed height: 6 ft 2 in (1.88 m)
- Listed weight: 180 lb (82 kg)

Career information
- High school: Murrah (Jackson, Mississippi)
- College: Alabama (1990–1993)
- NBA draft: 1993: 1st round, 21st overall pick
- Drafted by: Portland Trail Blazers
- Playing career: 1993–2004
- Position: Shooting guard
- Number: 26

Career history

Playing
- 1993–1996: Portland Trail Blazers
- 1996–1997: Minnesota Timberwolves
- 1997–1999: Los Angeles Clippers
- 1999: Minnesota Timberwolves
- 1999–2000: Olympiacos
- 2001: Orlando Magic
- 2001–2002: Lokomotiv Rostov
- 2003: Upea Capo D'Orlando
- 2003–2004: Lokomotiv Rostov
- 2004: Las Vegas Rattlers

Coaching
- 2021: Vegas Ballers

Career highlights
- Greek League All-Star (1999); First-team All-SEC (1993); Fourth-team Parade All-American (1989); McDonald's All-American (1989); Mississippi Mr. Basketball (1989)

Career NBA statistics
- Points: 2,882 (7.6 ppg)
- Rebounds: 660 (1.7 rpg)
- Assists: 715 (1.9 apg)
- Stats at NBA.com
- Stats at Basketball Reference

James "Hollywood" Robinson (born August 31, 1970) is an American former professional basketball player, most notably in the National Basketball Association (NBA).

Robinson, an undersized 6 ft 2 in (1.88 m) shooting guard, attended the University of Alabama before being selected with the 21st overall pick in the 1993 NBA draft by the Portland Trail Blazers.

== High school & college ==
As a high school star at Jackson, Mississippi's Murrah High School, Robinson played with another future NBA player, Lindsey Hunter.

Robinson was named Mississippi Mr. Basketball & was named a McDonald's All American in the same group that included such notable players as Kenny Anderson, Shaquille O'Neal, Jim Jackson, and Allan Houston. Robinson also won the All American slam dunk contest. He signed with Alabama, but was ineligible under the NCAA's Proposition 48 academic entrance guidelines. He redshirted, and after sitting out for a season he started play for the Crimson Tide in the 1991–92 season. As a redshirt freshman, Robinson came off the bench to average a team high 16.8 points per game, becoming the first freshman to lead the Tide in scoring since 1953.

As a junior at Alabama in 1992–93, Robinson led the Crimson Tide with 20.6 points per game, also tallying 4.5 rebounds and 2.3 assists per contest, and was named to the All-Southeastern Conference First Team. He set a school record by scoring 20 or more points in 12 straight games and became the first junior in Crimson Tide history to surpass 1,500 career points (he finished with 1,831). During his college career he played with two future NBA players, Latrell Sprewell and Robert Horry.

Robinson's scoring average was the highest at Alabama since Buck Johnson's 20.7 in 1986. After such a stellar year, Robinson elected to pass up his senior season and enter the 1993 NBA draft.

== NBA ==
Robinson had an uneventful first professional season (58 games with 11 minutes per game), although he did compete in the NBA Slam Dunk Contest at the NBA All-Star Weekend, where he finished in last place (6th). He also has the distinction of being one of three Robinsons that the Portland Trail Blazers had on its roster in the 1995–96 NBA season, the others being Clifford Robinson and Rumeal Robinson. Robinson's importance in Portland increased from 1994 to 1996, as Clyde Drexler was traded to Houston midway through 1994–95 and Terry Porter was often injured the following season. After that season, he was traded, along with Bill Curley and a conditional first-round pick to the Minnesota Timberwolves, for Isaiah Rider.

As a Timberwolf, Robinson achieved roughly the same averages than his final two Portland years, albeit in less playing time. Robinson did have a memorable December 30, 1996 game against the Cleveland Cavaliers in which he came off the bench to score 23 points in 10 minutes. In 1997–98, he signed as a free agent with the Los Angeles Clippers, and posted similar numbers (almost 8 ppg in 84 games). Waived in March 1999, he would rejoin the Timberwolves, with little impact.

Midway through 2000–01, after one season of absence, Robinson received a ten-day contract with the Orlando Magic, eventually his last NBA stint.

== Career statistics ==
Team	GP	GS	FG%	3P%	FT%	OR	DR	TRB	AST	STL	BLK	TO	PF	PTS
Portland	58	3	.365	.315	.672	0.6	0.8	1.3	1.2	0.5	0.3	0.9	1.2	4.8
Portland	71	25	.409	.341	.591	0.6	1.3	1.9	2.5	0.7	0.2	1.8	2.0	9.2
Portland	76	5	.399	.359	.659	0.6	1.5	2.1	2.0	0.4	0.2	1.5	1.9	8.5
Minnesota	69	5	.407	.382	.684	0.3	1.3	1.6	1.8	0.4	0.1	1.0	1.8	8.3
Los Angeles	70	13	.389	.329	.720	0.5	1.1	1.6	1.9	0.5	0.1	1.4	1.4	7.7
Los Angeles	14	0	.398	.267	.741	0.7	1.2	1.9	1.3	1.0	0.2	1.1	2.1	7.6
Minnesota	17	0	.322	.295	.571	0.5	1.6	2.1	2.2	0.5	0.3	1.6	1.8	4.5
Orlando	6	0	.364	.400	n/a	0.0	1.3	1.3	0.0	0.7	0.2	0.7	0.8	1.7

== Trades and contracts ==
- July 23, 1996 – Traded by the Blazers with Bill Curley and a conditional first round draft pick in 1997 or 1998 to the Minnesota Timberwolves for Isaiah "J.R." Rider.
- August 16, 1997 – Signed as a free agent by the Los Angeles Clippers; March 18, 1999 – waived
- March 26, 1999 – Signed to the first of two consecutive 10-day contracts by the Minnesota Timberwolves; April 17, 1999 – signed for the remainder of the season
