= Roy Clyde Clark =

American bishop (1920–2014)

- Born: July 24, 1920; Mobile, Alabama, U.S.
- Died: May 27, 2014 (aged 93); Nashville, Tennessee, U.S.
- Education: Millsaps College; Yale Divinity School
- Occupation: Clergyman
- Spouses: Esther Maddox; Marion Salisbury Hall
- Children: 2 daughters

Roy Clyde Clark (July 24, 1920 - May 27, 2014) was an American bishop of the United Methodist Church, elected in 1980.

== Early life ==
Clark was born on July 24, 1920, in Mobile, Alabama. His father, C. C. Clark, was a Methodist minister in Gulfport, Mississippi.

Clark earned the B.A. degree from Millsaps College in 1941 and the Bachelor of Divinity degree from Yale Divinity School in 1944. He also has been awarded honorary doctorates from Millsaps College and Columbia College in South Carolina.

== Career ==
Clark was ordained deacon in 1944 by Bishop J.L. Decell and Elder in 1946 by Bishop U.V.W. Darlington. Roy became a member of the Mississippi Annual Conference and held five different pastorates there between 1944 and 1963: Eastlawn, Pascagoula; Decell Memorial, Wesson; Centerville; Forest; and Capitol Street in Jackson. He pastored St. John's United Methodist Church in Memphis, Tennessee, from 1963 through 1967. He was the pastor of West End United Methodist Church in Nashville, Tennessee, from 1967 to 1980.

Clark was elected to the episcopacy in 1980 by the Southeastern Jurisdictional Conference of the UMC. He was assigned to the Columbia, South Carolina Episcopal Area (the South Carolina Annual Conference), where he served until his retirement in 1988. As a bishop he also served as a member of the U.M. General Board of Global Ministries (1980–88), serving as President of the UM Committee on Relief Program Department of the Board (1984–88).

After retiring from the active episcopacy, Bishop Clark served as executive director of the Committee on Episcopal Initiatives for Ministry and Mission of the U.M. Council of Bishops. As such he gave leadership in the development of the council's initiative on “Vital Congregations-Faithful Disciples.” He also served as an adjunct faculty member of the Memphis Theological Seminary (an institution of the Cumberland Presbyterian Church but recognized also by the UMC) and of the Vanderbilt Divinity School. He was listed as bishop-in-residence at the West End Church in Nashville, whose pastorate he once held.

Regarding homosexuality, Clark said he did not approve of its practise. He explained, "I can't give my approval, but I can say that God loves you."

== Personal life and death ==
Clark married Esther Maddox of McComb, Mississippi, on 7 June 1945. They had two daughters, Lynn Blanton Clark and Susan McEwen Clark, and two grandsons. After Esther's death on 8 April 1991, Bishop Clark married Marion Salisbury Hall on 4 April 1992.

Clark died on May 27, 2014, in Nashville, Tennessee.

== See also ==
- List of bishops of the United Methodist Church
