= Greg Miller (poet) =

American poet and academic (born 1957)

- Born: 1957 (age 68–69); Kentucky, United States
- Occupations: Poet, academic
- Writing career
- Genres: Poetry, literary criticism

David Gregory Miller (born 1957) is an American poet and academic. He has published seven books of poetry and his poems have appeared in literary magazines including Slate, Tikkun, and Southwest Review. He is professor emeritus of English at Millsaps College in Mississippi where he taught for 23 years. After the death of Stanley Moss in 2024, Miller became the head of Sheep Meadow Press.

== Biography ==
Miller was born in Kentucky and grew up in Hodgenville. He earned a B.A. in French Literature and Political Science from Vanderbilt University, an M.A. in English and Creative Writing from Stanford University, and a Ph.D. in English from the University of California at Berkeley. Miller was the Janice Trimble Professor of English at Millsaps College in Jackson, Mississippi where he served as chair of the English Department and President of the Faculty Council. Miller was named Mississippi Professor of the Year by the Carnegie Foundation for the Advancement of Teaching. He has been a writing fellow at the Fine Arts Work Center in Provincetown, the Yaddo and MacDowell Colonies in the United States, and at the Camargo Foundation and the CAMAC Centre d’Art in France.

Miller served as chair of the Sudanese Ministry Committee of the Episcopal Church, Diocese of Mississippi, where he edited and published, with the help of his students, a pamphlet of personal stories by Sudanese refugees entitled The Long Journey: Sudanese Refugees in Mississippi Tell Their Stories.

== Works ==
=== Poetry ===
- Iron Wheel (1998) University of Chicago Press
- Rib Cage (2001) University of Chicago Press
- Mississippi Sudan (2006) by Mercy Seat Press
- Watch (October 2009) University of Chicago Press
- The Sea Sleeps: New and Selected Poems (June 2014) Paraclete Press
- Now and Then Here and Now: New and Selected Poems (2022) Sheep Meadow Press
- Green Runs Through It (August 2026) Sheep Meadow Press

=== Translations ===
- George Herbert: Memoriae Matris Sacrum - To the Memory of My Mother: A Consecrated Gift. Critical Text, Translation, and Commentary. (co-editor/translator) (2012) George Herbert Journal, Special Studies and Monograms
- "George Herbert's Latin Prose: Orationes et Epistolae" (co-translator) (Fall 2017 / Spring 2018) George Herbert Journal.
- George Herbert’s Latin Verse: Musae Responsoriae, Passio Discerpta, Lucus, and Alia Poemata (co-editor/translator) (2017) George Herbert Journal, Special Studies and Monograms

=== Literary criticism ===
- The Language of Love in the Poetry of George Herbert and Emily Dickinson (1992) doctoral dissertation at University of California, Berkeley
- "Scribal and Print Publication: The Case of George Herbert's English Poems" (Fall 1999 / Spring 2000) George Herbert Journal, Volume 23, Numbers 1 & 2
- "Glorious, Afflicting, Beneficial": Triangular Romance and Dickinson's Rhetoric of Apocalypse" (Fall 2002) The Emily Dickinson Journal, Volume 11, Number 2
- George Herbert's ‘Holy Patterns’: Reforming Individuals in Community (June 2007) Continuum Literary Studies
- "Memory Work: Poetry, the Unconscious, and Justice: A Review of Peter Dale Scott's 'Poetry and Terror, Politics and Poetics in Coming to Jakarta'" (August 16, 2021) Tikkun
- Edward and George Herbert in the European Republic of Letters (co-editor) (August 2022) Manchester University Press.
