= Jackson Public School District =

School district in Mississippi, United States

Jackson Public Schools

Location
- 662 S. President Street; Jackson, MS 39201 USA
- Coordinates: 32.29223°N 90.182864°W

District information
- Type: Public
- Motto: "Transforming lives through excellent education"
- Grades: PreK–12
- Established: 1888
- Superintendent: Dr. Errick L. Greene
- Accreditations: Council of Great City Schools and College Board
- Schools: 52

Students and staff
- Students: Nearly 21,000 Students
- Staff: Nearly 5,000 employees
- Athletic conference: 5A-6A

Other information
- Website: www.jackson.k12.ms.us

The Jackson Public School District (JPSD) or Jackson Public Schools (JPS) is a public school district serving the majority of Jackson, the state capital and largest city of the U.S. state of Mississippi. Established in 1888, it is the second largest and only urban school district in the state.

== History ==
Jackson schools integrated by law as per Derek Jerome Singleton vs. the Jackson Public School District, decided in 1969. In 1969, 47% of the students were black. The enrollment declined by 5,000 students between the fall semester of 1969 and February 1, 1970, due to white flight. In fall 1970 the percentage of black students was now 61. A 1969 school bond proposed by the district failed as voters of all races were unsure what would happen as a result of integration; this was the first JPS bond that was not approved by voters. By 1994 the district's student body was 85% black. Initially the Parents for Public Schools Jackson (PPSJ) focused on efforts for the district to retain middle and upper class students, but the organization decided circa the mid-2000s that this was not a viable goal anymore. In 2017 the enrollment was 96% black, with Hispanics being the next-largest racial group.

In 2017 the district received its second F grade from the state government, so the state announced it would make efforts to take over management. Instead the state and the office of mayor Chokwe A. Lumumba partnered with the W. K. Kellogg Foundation to manage the district.

== Superintendent ==
Dr. Errick L. Greene is the superintendent of Jackson Public Schools. The Jackson Public Schools Board of Trustees announced Dr. Greene's appointment in the fall of 2018. Dr. Greene's commitment to education spans more than 25 years. His career started in the classroom teaching middle school and upper elementary students. Later, he became a principal, principal supervisor, chief of staff, and consultant to senior district leaders in Washington, D.C.; Detroit; Syracuse, New York; Baltimore; and Newark, New Jersey.

== Board of trustees ==
- Dr. Edward D. Sivak Jr., President, Ward 1
- Ms. Letitia S. Johnson, Member, Ward 2
- Frank Figgers, Member, Ward 3
- Ms. Barbara Hilliard, Vice President, Ward 4
- Dr. Jeanne Hairston, Member, Ward 5
- Cynthia Thompson, Member, Ward 6
- Dr. Robert Luckett, Secretary, Ward 7

The Jackson Public School District is governed by the Board of Trustees. Each member is appointed by the mayor and confirmed by the city council to represent the schools in each of the city's seven wards.

== Facts ==
Jackson Public Schools is the second-largest school district in Mississippi, serving nearly 21,000 scholars, representing more than 80 percent of school-aged children in the state's capital and only urban municipality. Jackson, Mississippi has about 170,000 residents in an area of 104 square miles. There are 7 high schools, 10 middle schools, 31 elementary schools, and 4 special program schools comprising the District's 52 school sites. These schools are divided into 7 feeder patterns based on the high school receiving the area's scholars.

There are nearly 5,000 employees in the District, which offers a variety of special programs such as Academic and Performing Arts Complex, International Baccalaureate, and Montessori.

Thanks to a Bond Referendum in 2006, three new schools were established–Kirksey Middle School, serving families in north Jackson, and Bates Elementary and Cardozo Middle Schools, serving the south Jackson community. The new schools opened in 2010. A second Bond Referendum passed in 2018. Work on 2018 Bond Construction Projects is underway.

In March 2010, First Lady Michelle Obama visited Pecan Park Elementary and Brinkley Middle Schools as a part of her Let's Move program.

== Schools ==
=== Callaway Feeder Pattern ===
- Robert M. Callaway High School (Mississippi) (Grades 9-12)
  - Henry J. Kirksey Middle School (Grades 6-8), named for state senator and civil rights leader Henry Kirksey
  - John Henry Powell Middle School (Grades 6-8)
  - Emma Gertrude Green Elementary School (Grades Pre-K-5), named for a schoolteacher
  - North Jackson Elementary School (Grades Pre-K-5)

=== Forest Hill Feeder Pattern ===
- Forest Hill High School (Grades 9-12)
  - Cardozo Middle School (Grades 6-8)
  - Bates Elementary School (Grades K-5)
  - Oak Forest Elementary School (Grades K-5)
  - Timberlawn Elementary School (Grades Pre-K-5)
  - Van Winkle Elementary School (Grade Pre-K)

=== Jim Hill Feeder Pattern ===
- Jim Hill High School (Grades 9-12)
  - Northwest Jackson IB Middle School (Grades 6-8)
  - Peeples Middle School
  - Baker Elementary Schools (Grades Pre-K-5)
  - Isable Elementary School (Grades K-5)
  - Key Elementary School
  - Obama Magnet IB Elementary School (Grades Pre-K-5)
  - Shirley Elementary School (Grades Pre-K-5)
  - Wilkins Elementary School

=== Lanier Feeder Pattern ===
- Lanier Jr. Sr. High School (Grades 7-12)
  - Galloway Elementary Schools (Grades Pre-K-5)
  - Johnson Elementary School (Grades Pre-K-5)
  - Walton Elementary School (Grades Pre-K-5)

=== Murrah Feeder Pattern ===
- Murrah High School (Grades 9-12)
  - Bailey APAC Middle School (Grades 4-8)
  - Boyd Elementary School (Grades K-5)
  - Casey Elementary School (Grades K-5)
  - McLeod Elementary School (Grades K-5)
  - McWillie Elementary School (Grades Pre-K-5)
  - Spann Elementary School (Grades K-5)

=== Provine Feeder Pattern ===
- Provine High School (Grades 9-12)
  - Blackburn Middle School (Grades 6-8)
  - Clausell Elementary School (Grades Pre-K-5)
  - John Hopkins Elementary School
  - Pecan Park Elementary School (Grades Pre-K-5)

=== Special Schools ===
- Capital City Alternative School
- Career Development Center
- JPS-Tougaloo Early College High School
- Re-Engaging in Education for All to Progress

=== Former schools ===
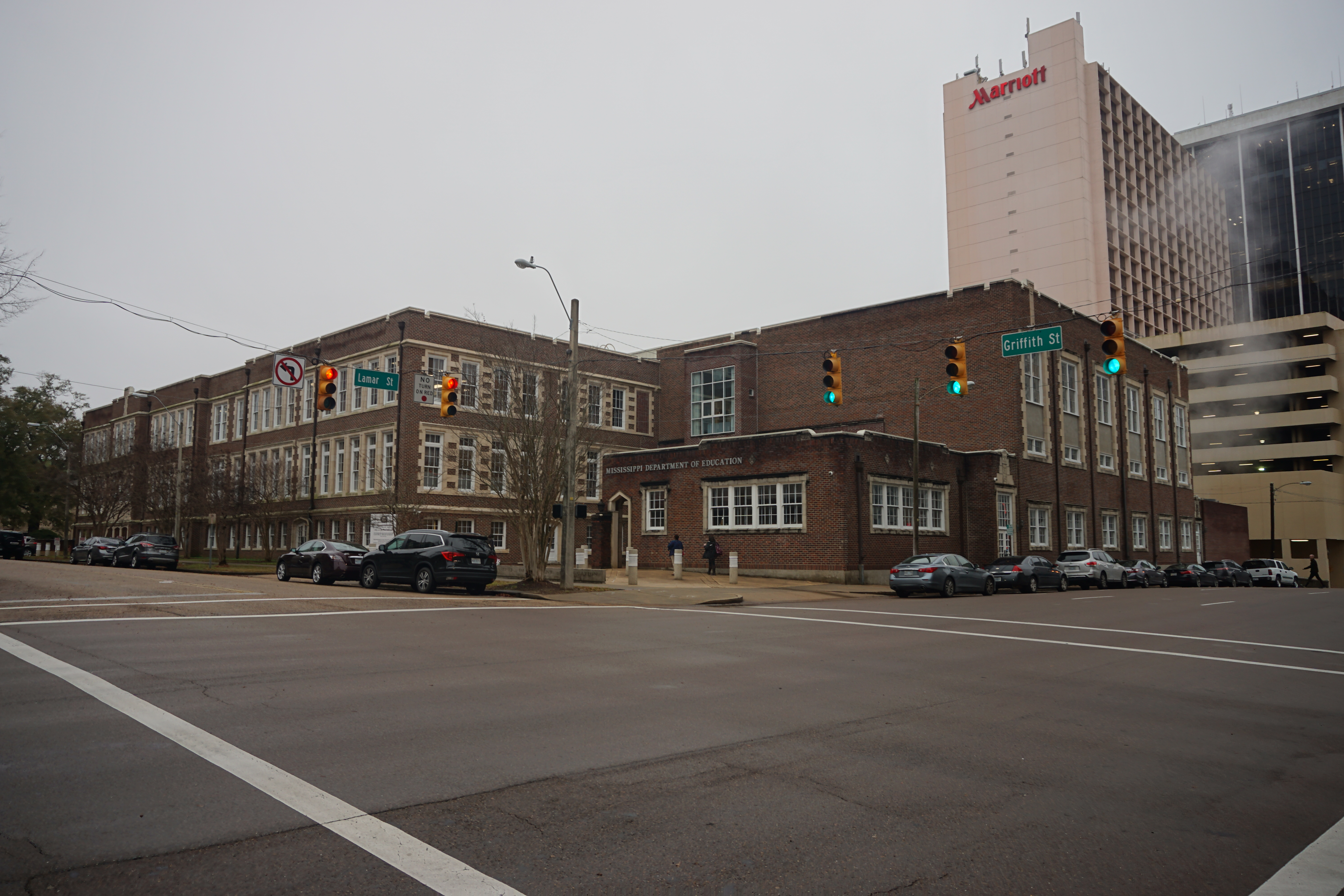
The former Central High School, now the headquarters of the Mississippi Department of Education

High schools

- Central High School
- Council Manhattan High School
- Sam M. Brinkley High School (Blacks only, 1959–1969)
- Wingfield High School (closed 2024)

Middle schools

- Chastain Middle School
- Whitten Middle School

Elementary schools

- Quintard Baker Elementary (demolition scheduled circa 2024)
- Bradley Elementary School
- Dawson Elementary School
- Emma French Elementary School (demolition scheduled circa 2024)
- Lake Elementary School
- Lester Elementary School
- Marshall Elementary School
- Raines Elementary School
- Smith Elementary School
- Sykes Elementary School
- Woodville Heights Elementary School (demolition scheduled circa 2024)

== Special Programs ==
- Academic and Performing Arts Complex (APAC)
- Academies of Jackson
- Advanced Placement
- Advanced Seminar
- Arts Access
- Ask for More Arts
- Dual Enrollment Program
- Duke Talent Identification Program
- Gifted Education Program (GEP)-Open Doors
- Health-Related Professions
- International Baccalaureate
- Junior Reserve Officers Training Corps
- Montessori
- National Honor Society
- Pre-Kindergarten
- Strings in the Schools
- Summer Reading Program: Read On, Jackson!
- Youth Court Schools
- Early College High School

== Demographics ==
In 2017 96% of the students were black, and the next largest racial group was Hispanic students. That year about 99% of the students were eligible to receive lunches at school for no cost or for a reduced cost; in other words they were classified as low income. Circa 2017 the median income for the city of Jackson was $32,250.

In 2017 Susan Womack, president of the PPSJ from 2000 to 2012, stated that middle to upper-class families in Jackson tended to leave public school after elementary school, with parents who remained in Jackson enrolling their children in private school, and those who wished to continue enrolling their children in public schools moving to Madison County.

In the first month of the 1969–1970 school year, the district had 39,079 students: 20,851, or 53%, were white, and 18,228, or 47%, were black. In the first month of the 1970–1971 school year, the enrollment was 30,723 students: 11,968, or 39%, were white, and 18,755, or 61%, were black. In 1994 the district had 32,731 students, with 27,868 - 85% - being black; this was the first year that the Mississippi Department of Education (MDE) published racial demographics of school districts.

=== 2006-07 school year ===
There were a total of 31,941 students enrolled in the Jackson Public School District during the 2006–2007 school year. The gender makeup of the district was 50% female and 50% male. The racial makeup of the district was 97.51% African American, 1.83% White, 0.45% Hispanic, 0.18% Asian, and 0.03% Native American. 76.6% of the district's students were eligible to receive free lunch.

=== Previous school years ===
| School Year | Enrollment | Gender Makeup | | Racial Makeup | | | | |
| School Year | Enrollment | Female | Male | Asian | African American | Hispanic | Native American | White |
|---|---|---|---|---|---|---|---|---|
| 2005-06 | 32,403 | 50% | 50% | 0.15% | 97.25% | 0.42% | 0.02% | 2.16% |
| 2004-05 | 31,611 | 50% | 50% | 0.18% | 97.01% | 0.35% | 0.03% | 2.43% |
| 2003-04 | 31,640 | 50% | 50% | 0.19% | 96.25% | 0.31% | 0.03% | 3.22% |
| 2002-03 | 31,529 | 50% | 50% | 0.21% | 95.83% | 0.23% | 0.04% | 3.70% |

== Accountability statistics ==
| | 2006-07 | 2005-06 | 2004-05 | 2003-04 | 2002-03 |
|---|---|---|---|---|---|
| District Accreditation Status | Accredited | Accredited | Accredited | Accredited | Accredited |
School Performance Classifications
| Level 5 (Superior Performing) Schools | 6 | 7 | 4 | 3 | 2 |
| Level 4 (Exemplary) Schools | 14 | 7 | 12 | 10 | 13 |
| Level 3 (Successful) Schools | 28 | 32 | 28 | 30 | 27 |
| Level 2 (Under Performing) Schools | 7 | 9 | 11 | 10 | 11 |
| Level 1 (Low Performing) Schools | 0 | 0 | 0 | 2 | 2 |
| Not Assigned | 1 | 1 | 1 | 2 | 2 |

== School uniforms ==
In April 2005, the district adopted a policy requiring elementary and middle school pupils to wear uniforms.

== See also ==
- List of school districts in Mississippi
