= Bailey Magnet High School =

Coordinates: 32°19′28″N 90°10′34″W

Bailey APAC Middle School
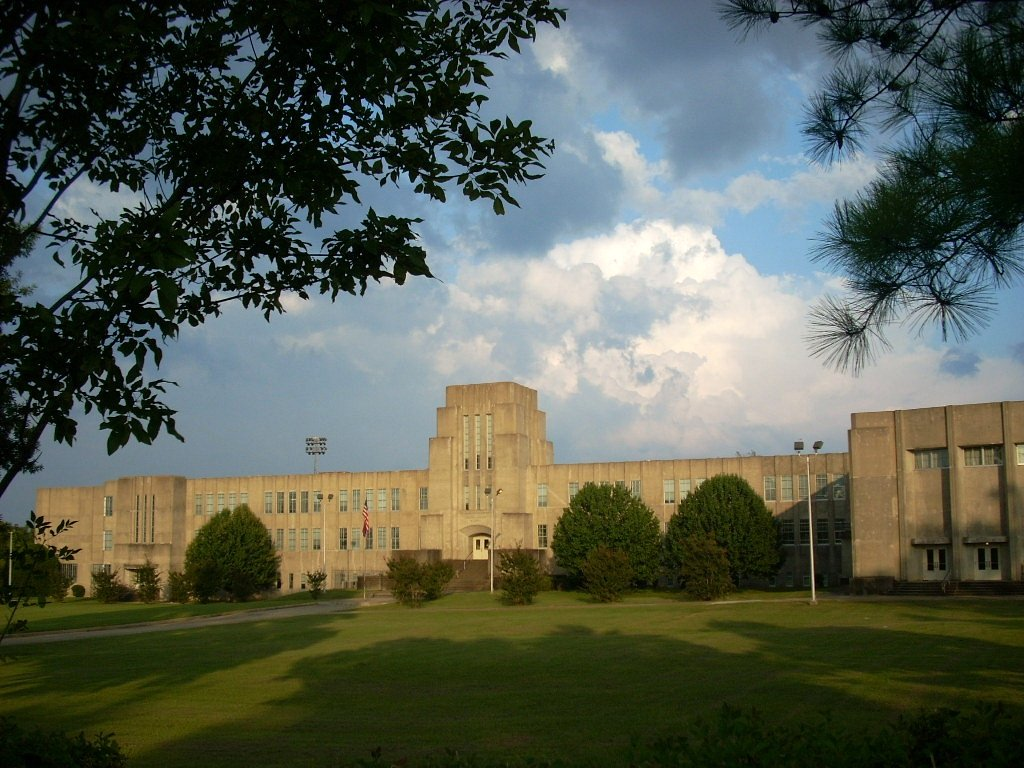

Location
- 1900 North State Street; Jackson, Mississippi; United States

Information
- Established: 1938; 88 years ago
- School district: Jackson Public School District
- Teaching staff: 26.21 (FTE)
- Grades: grades 4-8
- Enrollment: 267 (2023-2024)
- Student to teacher ratio: 10.19
- Colors: Black & Silver
- Website: www.jackson.k12.ms.us/school_sites/bailey/index.htm

Bailey Magnet High School, originally known as Bailey Junior High School and now Bailey APAC Middle School, is a middle school in Jackson, Mississippi, United States. The mascot of Bailey Magnet Middle School is the Mighty Knights. The school is located within the Belhaven Neighborhood.

== Architecture ==
Built in 1938, Bailey Magnet's art-deco building has been marveled as an architectural wonder. In 2007, it was voted as a top architectural site by the state chapter of the American Institute of Architects. According to The Washington Post, its architect, A. Hays Town, while employed at N.W. Overstreet designed the building.

It was rumored to have made the cover of a 1938 Life magazine for the school's forward look and his revolutionary technique of formed-in-place concrete, but there was an article about it in Life. The article mentioned the marvel lying "in the details" which include "carved stone reliefs of Andrew Jackson, the namesake of the city of Jackson with his troops and Chief Pushmataha with his braves, allies in the Indian wars," at the front footsteps of the building. The halls are terrazzoed and the great auditorium has "ornate columns and a stylized horse-and-rider sculpture."

== Demographics ==
There were 523 students enrolled in Bailey Magnet High during the 2006–2007 school year. The gender makeup of the district was 56% female and 44% male. The racial makeup of the school was 97.90% African American, 0.76% White, 0.96% Hispanic, and 0.38% Asian.
