= James Rhea Preston =

American educator (1853–1922)

- Born: January 22, 1853; Washington County, Virginia
- Died: April 3, 1922 (aged 69); Jackson, Mississippi
- Occupations: Teacher; Superintendent of Public Education; College President
- Years active: 1875-1911

James Rhea Preston (January 22, 1853 – April 3, 1922) was an American educator and administrator renowned for his contributions to women's higher education in Mississippi. He was elected as the Superintendent of Public Education for the state of Mississippi, serving from 1885 to 1896. He founded Stanton College for Young Women in Natchez, Mississippi, and served as its president. He later served as a college president for Belhaven College in Jackson, Mississippi.

== Early life and education ==
Born in Washington County, Virginia, Preston was the son of Colonel James T. Preston and Fannie Rhea. At age 16, he began attending Georgetown University, where he studied for two years. He then went to Emory and Henry College, earning his bachelor's degree in 1863, and a master's degree in 1875.

The state motto of Mississippi, Virtute et Armis, meaning by valor and arms, is attributed to Preston, who suggested it during his tenure as Superintendent of Education.

== Career ==
In 1875, Preston began his teaching career in Tennessee, followed by positions in Indiana and Okolona, Mississippi, from 1875 to 1878. During his tenure in Okolona, he was admitted to the Mississippi bar. He subsequently taught in Center Point and Water Valley, Mississippi. He was elected superintendent the Water Valley schools in 1881.

From 1885 to 1896, Preston served as Mississippi's elected superintendent of public education. In this capacity, he was involved in overseeing the state's public education system, which faced significant challenges after the Reconstruction era. Preston worked to improve teacher preparation and examination and advocated for increased funding for public schools.

In 1898, Preston founded Stanton College for Young Women in Natchez, Mississippi, serving as its president. The institution operated in the historic Stanton Hall.

In 1904, he bought Belhaven College for Young Ladies in Jackson, Mississippi and served as its president until 1910. His tenure at Belhaven was marked by significant growth and development of the college.

He retired from academic administration in 1911.
