= Noland Smith =

American football player (born 1943)

No. 1, 46
- Positions: Wide receiver, Return specialist

Personal information
- Born: October 20, 1943 (age 83); Jackson, Mississippi, U.S.
- Listed height: 5 ft 6 in (1.68 m)
- Listed weight: 155 lb (70 kg)

Career information
- High school: Brinkley (Jackson)
- College: Tennessee State (1963-1966)
- NFL draft: 1967: 6th round, 156th overall pick

Career history
- Kansas City Chiefs (1967–1969); San Francisco 49ers (1969)

Awards and highlights
- Super Bowl champion (IV); AFL champion (1969)

Career NFL/AFL statistics
- Receptions: 2
- Receiving yards: 57
- Punt return yards: 635
- Kick return yards: 2,137
- Total touchdowns: 2
- Stats at Pro Football Reference

Noland "Super Gnat" Smith (born October 20, 1943) is an American former professional football player who was a wide receiver and return specialist for the Kansas City Chiefs (1967–1969) in the American Football League (AFL) and San Francisco 49ers (1969) in the National Football League (NFL). He played college football for the Tennessee A&I Tigers (now Tennessee State).

== College career ==
Smith played college football at Tennessee A&I University (now Tennessee State University), where he set numerous school records for punt returns. He holds the school records for career punt returns (100); punt return yardage in a game (243), and season (572); career punt return yardage (1,933); highest average per punt return for a season (19.0) and a career (19.3); and most punt return touchdowns during a season (4) and a career (9).

== Professional career ==
Known as "Super Gnat" for his short stature and light weight—he was listed at 5-6 1/4 and 154 pounds—he was the smallest-sized player in the AFL or NFL of his era. Smith was selected by the Kansas City Chiefs in the sixth round of the 1967 NFL/AFL draft. In his rookie season with the Chiefs in 1967, Smith led the American Football League in kickoff return yardage with 1,360 yards. On December 17, 1967, Smith returned a kickoff 106 yards for a touchdown, which held the record for longest kickoff return in Kansas City Chiefs history for 49 years until Knile Davis broke it on January 9, 2016. Smith currently ranks 18th on the NFL's all-time kick return average list with 26.06 yards per return.

During his three seasons in the AFL and the NFL with the Chiefs and 49ers, Smith was almost exclusively on kickoff and punt returns, with 63 punt returns for 635 yards and one touchdown and 82 kickoff returns for 2,137 yards and one touchdown, but only three rushing attempts for six yards, two pass receptions for 57 yards.

== After football ==
Smith and his wife, Gloria, celebrated their 50th wedding anniversary in 2012. They have three children, Noland Jr., Tonya and Kevin, and three grandchildren, Jade, Noland III and Niqui. Smith retired in 2013 after 43 years with the city of Jackson, Mississippi Parks & Recreation Department. For 21 of those years, he was center coordinator at the Medgar Evers Community Center in Jackson.

Smith appeared as "Superbug" in the 1970 movie M*A*S*H.

Year	Title	Role	Notes
1970	MASH	Football Player - 325th Evac. 'Superbug'	Uncredited
