= Debra Gibbs =

American attorney and politician

Member of the Mississippi House of Representatives from the 72nd district
- In office October 14, 2016 – December 29, 2022
- Preceded by: Kimberly Campbell Buck
- Succeeded by: Justis Gibbs

Personal details
- Born: Gulfport, Mississippi, U.S.
- Party: Democratic
- Education: University of Southern Mississippi (BS); Mississippi College (MBA, JD)

Debra Hendricks Gibbs is an American attorney and politician who served as a member of the Mississippi House of Representatives for the 72nd district from 2016 to 2022.

== Early life and education ==
Gibbs was born in Gulfport, Mississippi. She earned a Bachelor of Science degree in accounting from the University of Southern Mississippi, a Master of Business Administration from Mississippi College, and a Juris Doctor from the Mississippi College School of Law.

== Career ==
After earning her undergraduate degree, Gibbs worked for Entergy. From 1984 to 1989, Gibbs worked as the director of the Jackson State University Center of Development. From 1989 to 1996, she was the director of the Mississippi Department of Human Services for accounting and finance. After leaving government, Gibbs worked as an attorney. From 2010 to 2015, she was a member of the Mississippi Workers' Compensation Commission. Gibbs was then elected to the Mississippi House of Representatives and assumed office on October 14, 2016. Gibbs served as the vice chair of the House Tourism Committee. Gibbs resigned from the chamber to assume a judicial appointment.
