= Kimberly Campbell Buck =

American politician (born 1972)

Member of the Mississippi House of Representatives from the 72nd district
- In office 2008 – May 2016
- Succeeded by: Debra Gibbs

Personal details
- Born: January 13, 1972 (age 54) Jackson, Mississippi
- Party: Democratic
- Education: Mississippi State University; Auburn University; University of Mississippi
- Occupation: Attorney

Kimberly Campbell Buck (born Kimberly L. Campbell on January 13, 1972) is an American politician who served as a Democratic member of the Mississippi House of Representatives, representing the 72nd district from 2008 to 2016. Before serving in the legislature, Campbell Buck worked as a policy analyst for Jackson and clerked for the Mississippi Supreme Court. She resigned in May 2016 to serve as state director of AARP.
