= Ronnie Henderson =

American basketball player

Personal information
- Born: March 29, 1974 (age 52) Gulfport, Mississippi, U.S.
- Listed height: 6 ft 4 in (1.93 m)
- Listed weight: 206 lb (93 kg)

Career information
- High school: Murrah (Jackson, Mississippi)
- College: LSU (1993–1996)
- NBA draft: 1996: 2nd round, 55th overall pick
- Drafted by: Washington Bullets
- Position: Guard

Career history
- 1997: Canberra Cannons
- 1997: Maccabi Giv'at Shmuel
- 1998–1999: STK Trefl Sopot

Career highlights
- 1st team all-sec (1995, 1996); McDonald's All-American (1993); First-team Parade All-American (1993); Second-team Parade All-American (1992)
- Stats at Basketball Reference

Ronnie Henderson (born March 29, 1974) is an American former professional basketball player. He was a 6-foot-4-inch (1.93 m) shooting guard.

Despite dislocating his shoulder, Henderson was the nation's top rated shooting guard during his senior high school year in 1993. Then, despite former San Antonio Spurs head coach Jerry Tarkanian making the then unheard of declaration of drafting a high school player (Henderson would be his first pick if he'd enter the draft), he joined the nation's top point guard, Randy Livingston, at LSU. However, college basketball's most highly touted backcourt duo never lived up to expectations due to injuries to Livingston.

Henderson did go on to lead the SEC in scoring two straight years (23.3 points per game as a sophomore, 21.8 ppg as a junior) despite suffering knee injuries of his own. He was a 1st team All SEC selection in 1995 and 1996.

Henderson chose to leave school after his junior year where he slipped far below most people's expectations when he was selected by the Washington Bullets as the 55th overall pick of the 1996 NBA draft. Henderson went on to play overseas. He played in Australia, Spain, Poland and France. He retired in 2006.

Henderson ran for mayor in the 2025 Gulfport municipal election, promoting beautification projects in the city as a way to contribute to a higher quality of life for citizens. He lost in the Democratic primary to former state representative Sonya Williams Barnes.
