= James Kimbrell =

American poet (born 1967)

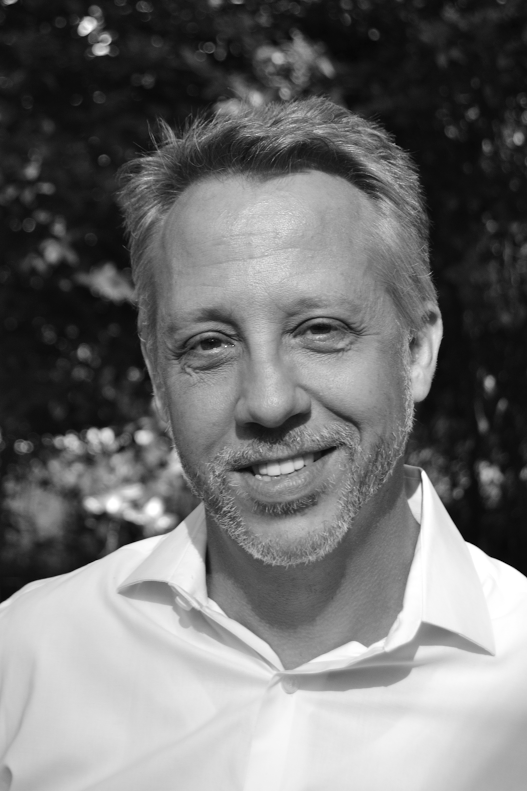
- Born: August 10, 1967 (age 59); Jackson, Mississippi, U.S.
- Education: University of Southern Mississippi; University of Virginia; University of Missouri
- Occupation: Poet
- Writing career
- Genre: Poetry

James Kimbrell (born 1967) is an American poet.

== Life ==
As an undergraduate he majored in philosophy at Millsaps College, where his poetry was first published in the literary magazine Stylus.

He graduated from the University of Southern Mississippi with an M.A., from University of Virginia with an MFA, and from University of Missouri in Columbia, Missouri with a Ph.D. He teaches at Florida State University.

His work has appeared in Poetry, Field, Fence, The Nation, and Prairie Schooner.

== Awards ==
- National Endowment for the Arts Individual Artist Fellowship, Creative Writing-2017

== Works ==
=== Books ===
- Smote. Sarabande Books. 2015. ISBN 978-1-941411-09-4.
- My Psychic. Sarabande Books. 2006. ISBN 978-1-932511-25-3.
- The Gatehouse Heaven. Sarabande Books. 1998. ISBN 978-1-889330-13-6.

=== Translations ===
- Three Poets of Modern Korea: Yi Sang, Hahm Dong-Seon and Choi Young-Mi, a collection of translations from the Korean. Translated by Jung-Yul Yu; James Kimbrell. Sarabande Books. 2002. ISBN 978-1-889330-71-6.

=== Anthologies ===
- Michael Collier, ed. (2000). "True Descenders". American Poetry: The Next Generation. UPNE. ISBN 978-0-87451-964-8.
