= Capital City Alternative School =

Location
- 2221 Boling Street; Jackson, Mississippi 39213; United States
- 32.359011°N 90.241476°W

Information
- Motto: "Working to Redirect Students for Success"
- School district: Jackson Public School District
- Principal: Marie B. Harris
- Grades: 4–12
- Colors: Royal Blue & Gold
- Mascot: Bison
- Website: ccas.jackson.k12.ms.us

Capital City Alternative School is an alternative school in Jackson, Mississippi operated by Jackson Public School District. It serves "students in grades 4-12 who have been suspended/expelled from Jackson Public Schools for 10 days or longer."

== 2011 handcuffing litigation ==
On June 8, 2011, the Southern Poverty Law Center filed a federal class action lawsuit against the district over allegations that staff at Capital City Alternative School unlawfully shackled and handcuffed pupils.
