= Kendell Watkins =

American football player (born 1973)

No. 83
- Position: Tight end

Personal information
- Born: March 8, 1973 (age 53); Jackson, Mississippi, U.S.
- Listed height: 6 ft 1 in (1.85 m)
- Listed weight: 305 lb (138 kg)

Career information
- High school: Provine (MS)
- College: Mississippi State
- NFL draft: 1995: 2nd round, 59th overall pick

Career history
- Dallas Cowboys (1995–1996); Denver Broncos (1998)*; Dallas Cowboys (1998)*
- * Offseason or practice squad member only

Awards and highlights
- Super Bowl champion (XXX)

Career NFL statistics
- Receptions: 1
- Receiving yards: 8
- Stats at Pro Football Reference

Kendell Mario Watkins (born March 8, 1973) is an American former professional football player who was a tight end for the Dallas Cowboys of the National Football League (NFL). He was selected by the Cowboys in the second round of the 1995 NFL draft. He played college football for the Mississippi State Bulldogs.

== Early life ==
Watkins attended Provine High School, receiving All-district, All-metro and second-team All-state honors as a senior, after registering 14 receptions for 246 yards and 2 touchdowns. He played tight end, linebacker and defensive end.

He accepted a football scholarship from Mississippi State University. As a freshman, he played only on special teams. As a sophomore, he underwent arthroscopic knee surgery near mid-season, which limited his playing time at tight end, although he was active in every contest and started 3 games. In one of those starts against Arkansas State University, he contributed to the team rushing for 464 yards in a 56–6 win.

As a junior, he posted 6 receptions for 68 yards and one touchdown, but also accounted for 36 knockdown blocks. Against the University of South Carolina, he made a key block that dropped two defenders during a one-yard touchdown run in a 23–0 win.

As a senior, he registered 10 starts, 5 receptions for 66 yards, one touchdown and 44 knockdown blocks. In the season opening win against the University of Memphis he had a career-high 3 catches for 43 yards. His biggest reception came against the University of Tennessee for a two-yard touchdown with 36 seconds left in the game, for a 24-21 come from behind win. He made 3 receptions for 20 yards against North Carolina State University in the Peach Bowl. He also played in the Senior Bowl.

== Professional career ==
=== Dallas Cowboys (first stint) ===
Watkins was selected by the Dallas Cowboys in the second round (59th overall) of the 1995 NFL draft, to be the team's blocking tight end and help improve the running production. Even as a rookie he was one of the biggest tight ends in the NFL, while backing up Jay Novacek. In the season opener against the New York Giants, he contributed to the offense recording 459 yards, including 230 rushing yards - the most by the Cowboys since October 31, 1993.

In 1995, he was part of an offensive line that allowed the second fewest sacks in the NFL (18), breaking the franchise record of 20. He also helped the team finish the season ranked fifth in the league in total offense, with running back Emmitt Smith gaining a club record 1,773 rushing yards, scoring an NFL record 25 rushing touchdowns and capturing his fourth NFL rushing title in 5 years. He was a part of the Super Bowl XXX winning team.

Watkins suffered a torn anterior cruciate ligament in his right knee during the 1996 preseason and was placed on the injured reserve list. On July 14, 1997, the team released him in a controversial move, because it was claimed that he still wasn't healthy.

=== Denver Broncos ===
In 1998, he signed with the Denver Broncos after being out of football for a year. The team ended up trading him back to the Dallas Cowboys during the preseason, in exchange for a fifth round draft choice (not exercised).

=== Dallas Cowboys (second stint) ===
In 1998, the Dallas Cowboys released him before the start of the season, after claiming tight end Hayward Clay off waivers.
