= James E. Bowley =

American professor of religion

James E. Bowley is an American researcher and professor who served as the former Chair and Professor of Religious Studies at Millsaps College. He received his Ph.D. in Hebrew Studies from the Hebrew Union College-Jewish Institute of Religion in 1992.

== Academic career ==
Bowley is an editor of the Dead Sea Scrolls Concordance project, along with Martin Abegg, Jr. and Edward Cook. In addition to the Dead Sea Scrolls, Bowley's research and publishing focus on the Jewish literature of the Greco-Roman world and the cultural interactions among Jews, Greeks, and later Christians, and the use of written and oral traditions in Jewish, Christian, and Islamic communities. Bowley has also written a column for The Clarion-Ledger on religious issues of the day, and is a frequent speaker for community and scholarly events.

Bowley was the winner of the 2009 Humanities Teacher of the Year, given by the Mississippi Humanities Council. He won the Millsaps College Distinguished Professor Award in 2016.

== Dismissal ==
In 2025, Bowley was fired from Millsaps College after sending an email to a class of three students from his college email account expressing his unhappiness with the results of the 2024 United States presidential election, attributing the results to what he described as pervasive fascism and racism. The Foundation for Individual Rights and Expression appealed for Bowley to be reinstated. Bowley also received backing from students, faculty, and alumni.

== Research and publications ==
- Introduction to Hebrew Bible: A Guided Tour of Israel's Sacred Library. Prentice Hall; 1 edition (March 3, 2007). ISBN 0-13-045357-9
- Living Traditions of the Bible: Scripture in Jewish, Christian, and Muslim Practice. Chalice Press (September 17, 1999) ISBN 0-8272-2127-4
- The Dead Sea Scrolls Concordance: The Non-Biblical Texts from Qumran (Dead Sea Scrolls Concordance, 1) (Multilingual Edition) (v. 1) by Martin G. Abegg, James E. Bowley, Edward M. Cook, and Emanuel Tov. Brill Academic Publishers (October 2003) ISBN 90-04-12521-3
- The Dead Sea Scrolls Concordance: The Biblical Texts from the Judaean Desert (Dead Sea Scrolls Concordance, 3) (Multilingual Edition) (v. 3) by Martin G. Abegg, James E. Bowley, Edward M. Cook. Brill Academic Publishers (October 2009) ISBN 90-04-13284-8
- “Rethinking the Concept of ‘Bible’: Some Theses and Proposals,” Henoch: Historical and Philological Studies on Judaism, James E. Bowley and John C. Reeves. XXV (2003)
- “Prophets and Prophecy at Qumran” in The Dead Sea Scrolls after Fifty Years, eds. James VanderKam and Peter Flint. Leiden: E.J. Brill, 1998, vol. 2:354-378.
- A Preliminary Edition of the Unpublished Dead Sea Scrolls: The Hebrew and Aramaic Texts of Cave Four, Fascicle 4, James E. Bowley, Martin Abegg, Jr. and Ben Zion Wacholder. New York: Biblical Archaeology Society, 1996.

== External sources ==
- Clarion Ledger article December 22, 2007
- Religious Studies Blog
