= Clay Foster Lee Jr. =

American bishop (1930–2024)

Clay Foster Lee Jr. (March 2, 1930 – November 11, 2024) was an American bishop in the United Methodist Church, elected in 1988.

== Earth life and education ==
Clay was born in Laurel, Mississippi, on March 2, 1930. He attended public schools in Laurel, graduating from Laurel High School. Lee was the recipient of the Lauren Eastman Rogers Award as Honor Student for the entire school. He earned his B.A. degree from Millsaps College in 1951, and his Bachelor of Divinity degree from Emory University’s Candler School of Theology in 1953. While at Millsaps, Lee was a member of the Omicron Delta Kappa leadership fraternity and received the Galloway Medal in 1951 for the best sermon preached by a ministerial student.

Lee was awarded the D.D. degree by Millsaps College (1985) and the Doctor of Letters degree by Tennessee Wesleyan College (1990).

== Ordained ministry ==
Lee was ordained deacon by Bishop Arthur J. Moore (1952) and elder by Bishop Marvin A. Franklin (1954). Rev. Lee's first pastorate was the Unity Charge in the Mississippi Annual Conference of the Methodist Church, which he began serving in 1949. Subsequently, Rev. Lee served the Capitol Street Church in Jackson as associate pastor; as the pastor of the Raymond Church; The First Methodist Church in Quitman; Galloway Memorial Church as Minister of Evangelism; Philadelphia's First Methodist; and the Leavell Woods Church in Jackson. Rev. Lee then was appointed the executive director of the Conference Council on Ministry; then as superintendent of the Brookhaven District, and finally as the senior minister of the Galloway Memorial U.M.C. in Jackson.

He was elected delegate to General and Jurisdictional Conferences, 1976–1988.

== Service to the greater community ==
Lee served as a member of the U.M. General Board of Pensions for three quadrennia, serving as president 1992–1996 (also Chairperson of the Committee on Disability, 1984–1988). He was a trustee of Millsaps College, 1974–1986 (secretary 1980–1986). During 1992–1996, he served as chairperson of The Appalachian Development Committee. Serving on the Mississippi Religious Leadership Conference, he was vice chairperson in 1988. While in Knoxville he served seven years on the board of directors of The United Way of Greater Knoxville. He was also the secretary of the Joint Committee on Communications of the U.M. Southeastern and South Central Jurisdictions in 1984, and chairperson 1992–1996.

== Episcopal ministry ==
Lee was elected to the episcopacy July 1988 by the Southeastern Jurisdictional Conference of the U.M. Church. He was assigned to the Knoxville Episcopal Area.

== Personal life and death ==
On May 27, 1951, Lee married Dorothy "Dot" Stricklin (born 1932). They had five children: Cecilia Ann Lee, Jack Stricklin Lee, Lisa Margaret Lee Mullins, Timothy Clay Lee, and Melanie Kay Lee Bernheim. They also had eight grandchildren. In retirement, Clay resided in Jackson, Mississippi. He died on November 11, 2024, at the age of 94.

== Selected writings ==
- Jesus Never Said Everyone Was Loveable, Abingdon Press. (Bishop Lee's sermons as the 1987 Speaker for "The Protestant Hour" radio broadcasts)

== See also ==
- List of bishops of the United Methodist Church

== Sources ==
- InfoServ, the official information service of The United Methodist Church.
- The Council of Bishops of the United Methodist Church
