= Nashlie Sephus =

American computer engineer and entrepreneur

- Born: Jackson, Mississippi, U.S.
- Education: Mississippi State University; Georgia Institute of Technology College of Engineering
- Occupations: Computer engineer, entrepreneur, technology evangelist
- Awards: Ada Lovelace Award (2019)

Nashlie H. Sephus is an American computer engineer and entrepreneur specialized in machine learning and algorithmic bias identification. She is a technology evangelist at Amazon Web Services. Sephus is co-founder and chief executive officer of Bean Path, a nonprofit startup company developing Jackson Tech District, a planned community and business incubator in Jackson, Mississippi.

== Life ==
Sephus was born in Jackson, Mississippi, where she was raised in an all-female household. She attended a two-week sleepaway engineering camp for girls that introduced her to computer engineering. Sephus graduated from Murrah High School in 2003. In 2007, she completed a B.S. in computer engineering at Mississippi State University. After graduating, Sephus won a GEM fellowship, which provided her a full-tuition graduate scholarship, internships, and a job placement at Delphi Electronics & Safety upon finishing her Ph.D. She earned a master's degree and Ph.D. (2014) in electrical and computer engineering from the Georgia Institute of Technology College of Engineering. Her dissertation was titled A framework for exploiting modulation spectral features in music data mining and other applications. Sephus' doctoral advisors were Aaron D. Lanterman and David V. Anderson.

In 2013, Sephus, then a doctoral student, began working part-time for the all black women startup Partpic, where she developed visual recognition algorithms and prototypes. Sephus later worked as a software engineer at Exponent in New York. In 2015, she joined Partpic full time as their chief technology officer. In 2016, Amazon acquired Partpic, and Sephus became leader of the Amazon Visual Search team in Atlanta. Sephus later became a machine learning and applied science manager at Amazon Web Services Artificial Intelligence. Her team develops tools for bias-identification for machine learning models. She is currently a technology evangelist at Amazon.

In 2018, Sephus began plans to create a technology community and business incubator in Jackson, Mississippi as part of her nonprofit startup company Bean Path. She is the company's cofounder and CEO. In 2019, Sephus and Julie Cwikla were awarded an Ada Lovelace Award. On September 11, 2020, Sephus purchased 12 acres near Jackson State University to create the Jackson Tech District.

== See also ==
- African-American women in computer science
- Women in engineering in the United States
