= Justis Gibbs =

American politician

Member of the Mississippi House of Representatives from the 72nd district
- Incumbent
- Assumed office January 2, 2024
- Preceded by: Debra Gibbs

Personal details
- Born: November 5, 1995 (age 30) Jackson, Mississippi
- Party: Democratic
- Education: Howard University (BS), University of Mississippi (JD)
- Occupation: Politician
- Profession: Attorney

Justis Gibbs serves as a member of the Mississippi House of Representatives for the 72nd District, affiliating with the Democratic Party, a position he has held since 2024.
