= Millsaps College =

Private college in Jackson, Mississippi, US

- Motto: Ad Excellentiam (Latin)
- Motto in English: In pursuit of excellence
- Type: Private liberal arts college
- Established: 1890; 136 years ago
- Religious affiliation: United Methodist Church
- Academic affiliations: IAMSCU; ACS; Annapolis Group
- Endowment: $115.5 million (2025)
- President: Frank Neville
- Faculty: 97 full-time
- Students: 600
- Location: Jackson, Mississippi, United States; 32°19′20″N 90°10′46″W
- Campus: Urban, 103 acres (42 ha)
- Colors: Purple and white
- Nickname: Majors and Lady Majors
- Sporting affiliations: NCAA Division III – SAA
- Mascot: The Millsaps Major
- Website: millsaps.edu
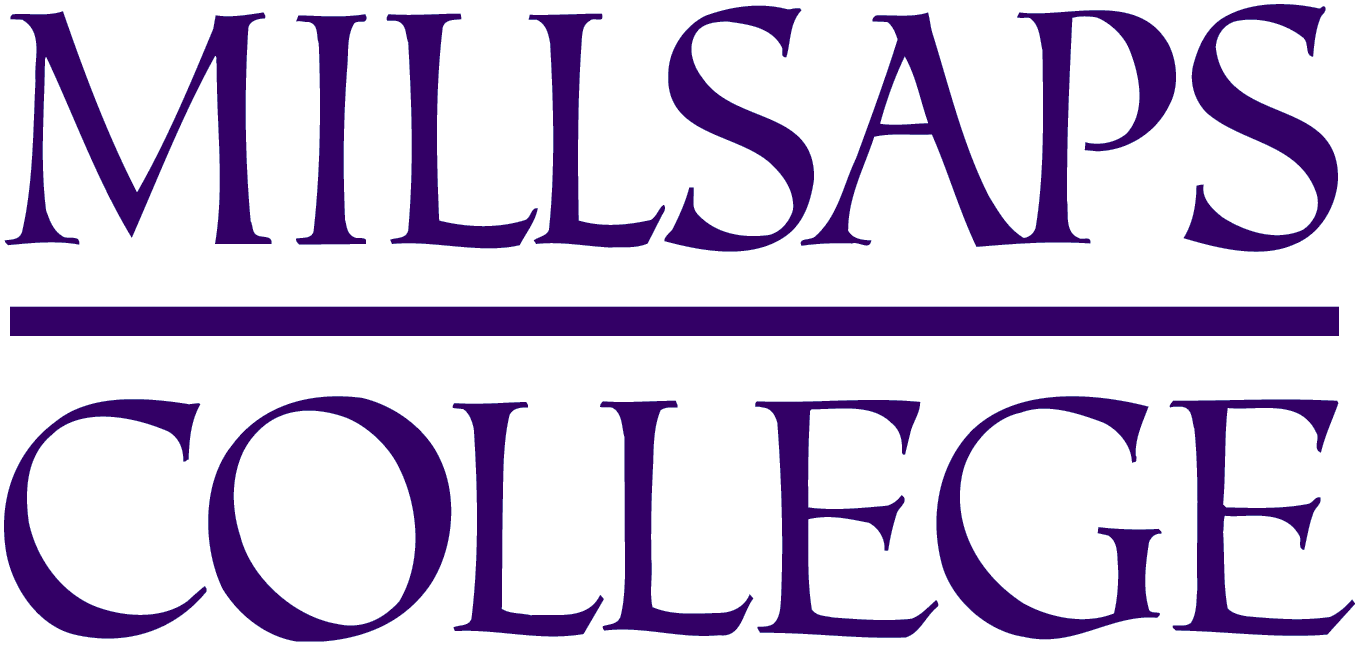

Millsaps College is a private liberal arts college in Jackson, Mississippi, United States. It was founded in 1890 and is affiliated with the United Methodist Church.

== History ==
The college was founded in 1889–90 by a Confederate veteran, Major Reuben Webster Millsaps, who donated the land for the college and $50,000. William Belton Murrah was the college's first president, and Bishop Charles Betts Galloway of the Methodist Episcopal Church South organized the college's early fund-raising efforts. Both men were honored with halls named in their honor. Major Millsaps and his wife are interred in a tomb near the center of campus. The current United Methodist Church continues to affiliate with the college.

=== Navy V-12 program ===
Millsaps was chosen as one of 131 sites for the training of Navy and Marine officers in the V-12 Navy College Training Program. In April 1943, 380 students arrived for the Navy V-12 program offering engineering, pre-medical and pre-dental training. Thereafter Millsaps began accepting students year-round for the program. A total of 873 officer candidates went through Millsaps between 1943 and 1945.

=== Civil rights era ===
In 1967, Millsaps College students protested the shooting of Jackson State University student and civil rights worker Benjamin Brown, who was killed by police at a protest. The Mississippi Sovereignty Commission photographed the Millsaps protesters and identified them. The Sovereignty Commission spied on and conspired against civil rights activists and organized pressure and economic oppression of those who supported the civil rights movement in Mississippi.

=== Dismissal of James Bowley ===
Millsaps College suspended and later dismissed James Bowley, a tenured professor of politics and religion, after he emailed three students that class was cancelled to "mourn and process this racist fascist country" after Donald Trump was elected in the 2024 United States elections. Millsaps interim provost Stephanie Rolph placed him on administrative leave, saying that it was because he "[shared] personal opinions with [his] students" using his official email. The Foundation for Individual Rights and Expression said that the college "fabricated a policy violation" as to fire Bowley in an article demanding his reinstatement that the college called "riddled with inaccuracies". The college's faculty council president, David Wood, told Inside Higher Ed that the suspension was "unfair and unsubstantiated" and the decision to ban Bowley without a hearing was done on "very poor judgment". However, he also described Bowley's past actions as "a bit reckless" and said that Bowley would "push the envelope" of the administration with controversial issues. One of these past issues involving Bowley was the defacement of the Christian Center, an academic building on campus that was set for renovation in 2017. Bowley and several students applied graffiti to the walls, and the graffiti included many politically charged comments about state and federal leaders. This was seen as an act of vandalism by the administration, and "disciplinary processes were initiated against the students and faculty [Bowley] involved."

A grievance panel of three faculty members called for a formal apology by Rolph, Bowley's reinstatement, and compensation to be given to Bowley. The panel writes that Rolph was unable provide a specific policy that Bowley violated and that no policy exists to regulate the use of campus emails to share personal opinions. Bowley said that he appealed his dismissal to the board of trustees.

=== Important dates in Millsaps history ===
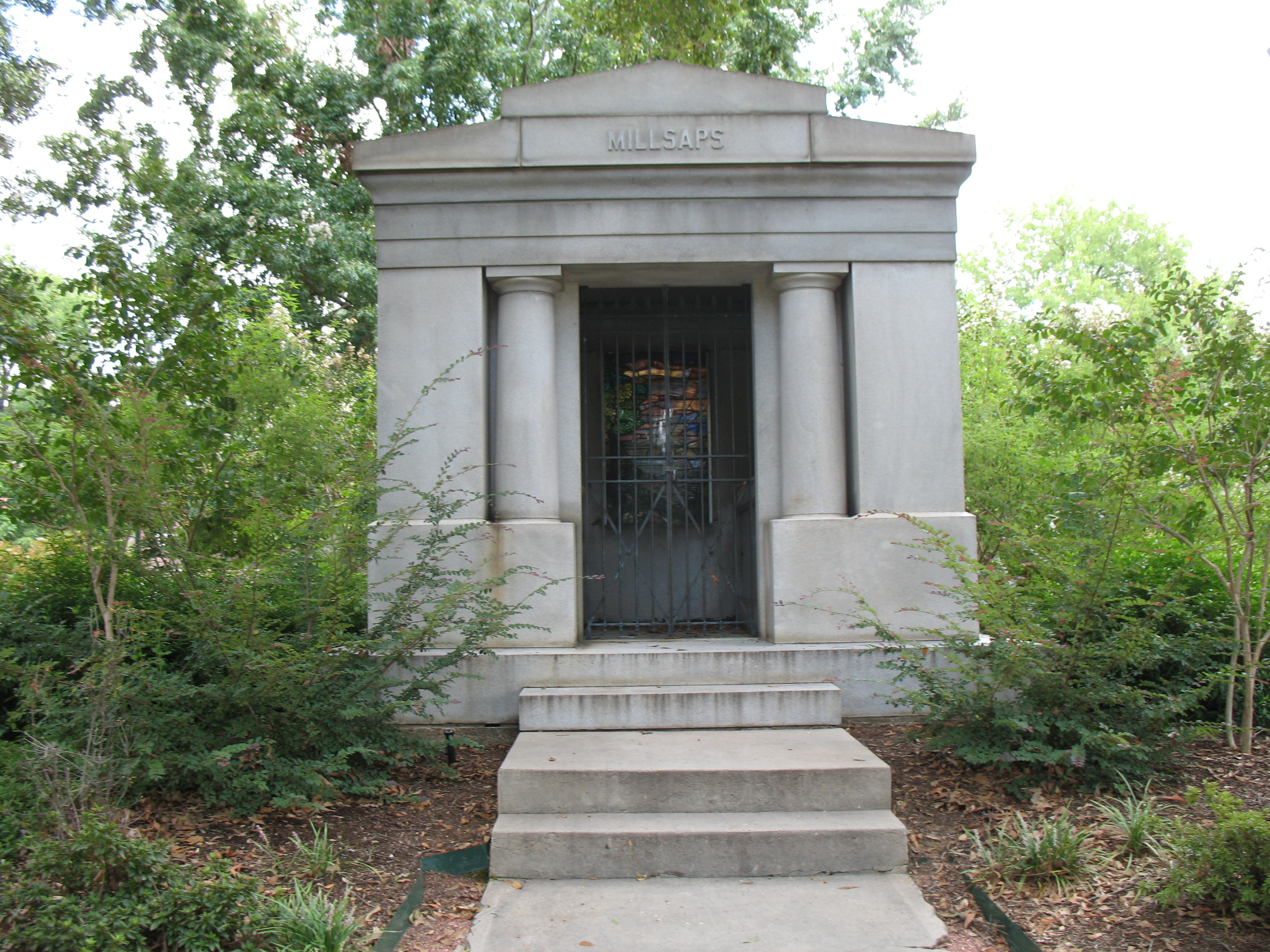
Mausoleum on the campus of Millsaps College, Jackson, Mississippi, containing the graves of Major Reuben Webster Millsaps and his wife

- 1890: Major Reuben Webster Millsaps founds the college with a personal gift of $50,000.
- 1901: Millsaps builds the first golf course in Mississippi.
- 1902: Mary Letitia Holloman becomes the first female graduate of Millsaps.
- 1908: Sing-Ung Zung of Suzhou, China, becomes the first international student to graduate from Millsaps.
- 1914: Old Main, one of the first buildings on campus, burns and is replaced by Murrah Hall.
- 1916: Major Millsaps dies and is interred on campus.
- 1931: The first night football game in Mississippi is played on the Millsaps campus between the Majors and Mississippi A&M (now Mississippi State University).
- 1936: Millsaps College absorbs bankrupt Grenada College during the Great Depression.
- 1943: Johnny Carson attends Millsaps for V-12 naval officer training, entertaining his comrades with a magic and humor act.
- 1944: Louis H. Wilson, who graduated from the college in 1941, receives the Medal of Honor for his actions at the Battle of Guam during World War II. Wilson became a General and the 26th Commandant of the Marine Corps in 1975. He was the first Marine Corps Commandant to serve full-time on the Joint Chiefs of Staff.
- 1947-48: Ruth Chang of Shanghai, China becomes one of the first non-white students to attend Millsaps.
- 1953: Dean Martin and Jerry Lewis judge a Millsaps beauty contest.
- 1965: Millsaps becomes the first all-white college in Mississippi to voluntarily desegregate.
- 1967: Robert F. Kennedy speaks at the college about the obligations of young Americans to give back to their country.
- 1975: Presidential candidate Jimmy Carter speaks to Millsaps students about the crisis in the Middle East.
- 1988: Millsaps initiates the first campus chapter of Habitat for Humanity in Mississippi.
- 1989: Millsaps becomes the first school in Mississippi to have a chapter of the Phi Beta Kappa honor society.
- 2025: Millsaps fires tenured professor James E. Bowley for expressing his political opinions in an e-mail.

=== Presidents ===
- William Belton Murrah, 1890–1910
- David Carlisle Hull, 1910–1912
- Alexander Farrar Watkins, 1912–1923
- David Martin Key, 1923–1938
- Marion Lofton Smith, 1938–1952
- Homer Ellis Finger, Jr., 1952–1964
- Benjamin Barnes Graves, 1965–1970
- Edward McDaniel Collins, Jr., 1970–1978
- George Marion Harmon (1978–2000) – After 22 years of leading Millsaps College, Harmon announced his resignation in the spring of 1999. His last day as president of Millsaps College was June 30, 2000.
- Frances Lucas (2000–2010) – Lucas was the first woman to hold the post at Millsaps. Lucas resigned on April 23, 2009. Lucas cited disagreements with faculty as the reason for her resignation.
- Howard McMillan, Dean of Millsaps' Else School of Management took over as Interim President in August 2009.
- Robert Pearigen, Vice President of University Relations at The University of the South, was selected to serve as the eleventh president of the college. He began his term in office on July 1, 2010.
- Frank Neville, Senior Vice President of Strategic Initiatives and Chief of Staff at Georgia Institute of Technology, was selected to serve as the twelfth president of the college. He began his term in office on June 17, 2024.

== Rankings and distinctions ==
Millsaps is one of 40 schools in Loren Pope's Colleges That Change Lives.

== Athletics ==
The school's sports teams are known as the Majors and their colors are purple and white. They participate in the NCAA Division III and the Southern Athletic Association. Women's sports include basketball, cross-country, golf, soccer, softball, swimming, tennis, track & field, and volleyball, while men's sports include baseball, basketball, cross-country, football, golf, soccer, swimming, tennis, and track & field.

== Notable faculty and alumni ==
- Rodney J. Bartlett, quantum chemist
- Michael Beck, actor
- Jim C. Barnett, surgeon and politician
- James E. Bowley, Hebrew scholar
- Gary Burghoff, actor
- Johnny Carson, longtime host of The Tonight Show
- Turner Cassity, poet
- Roy Clyde Clark, bishop in the United Methodist Church
- Scott Colom, U.S. Senator-elect for the State of Mississippi
- Lisa D'Amour, playwright
- David Herbert Donald, historian
- Shannon Rogers Duckworth, bishop in the Episcopal Diocese of Louisiana
- Nancy Plummer Faxon, organist and composer
- Ellen Gilchrist, author
- James E. Graves Jr., judge, Fifth Circuit Court of Appeals
- Winifred Green, activist from Mississippi during the civil rights movement
- Scott Tracy Griffin, author
- Ben M. Hall, author
- William Hester (1933), president of the United States Tennis Association from 1977 to 1978
- Alan Hunter, MTV VJ
- Clifton Hyde, Blue Man Group, Broadway Musician
- James Kimbrell, poet
- Clay Foster Lee Jr., Bishop of the United Methodist Church
- Robert William Lowry (pastor), LGBTQIA+ activist
- Ray Marshall, Secretary of Labor during the Carter administration
- Robert S. McElvaine, history professor
- Myron S. McNeil, Mississippi state legislator
- Greg Miller, poet
- Lewis Nordan, author
- Christopher Lee Nutter, author
- Claude Passeau, baseball player
- Rubel Phillips, Republican gubernatorial nominee in 1963 and 1967
- Paul Ramsey, ethicist
- Tate Reeves, Governor of Mississippi
- Robert C. Robbins, cardiothoracic surgeon, former President/CEO of Texas Medical Center, former President of The University of Arizona
- Stokes Robertson Jr., Justice of the Supreme Court of Mississippi from 1966 to 1982
- Vic Roby, former NBC staff announcer
- Julian Rush, clergyman, playwright, non-profit administrator
- Charles Sallis, historian and writer
- Kevin Sessums, author
- Otis Singletary, historian and 8th President of the University of Kentucky
- Donald Triplett, first person to be diagnosed with autism
- Eudora Welty, author
- Cassandra Wilson, jazz musician
- Louis H. Wilson Jr., Medal of Honor recipient
