= Central High School (Jackson, Mississippi) =

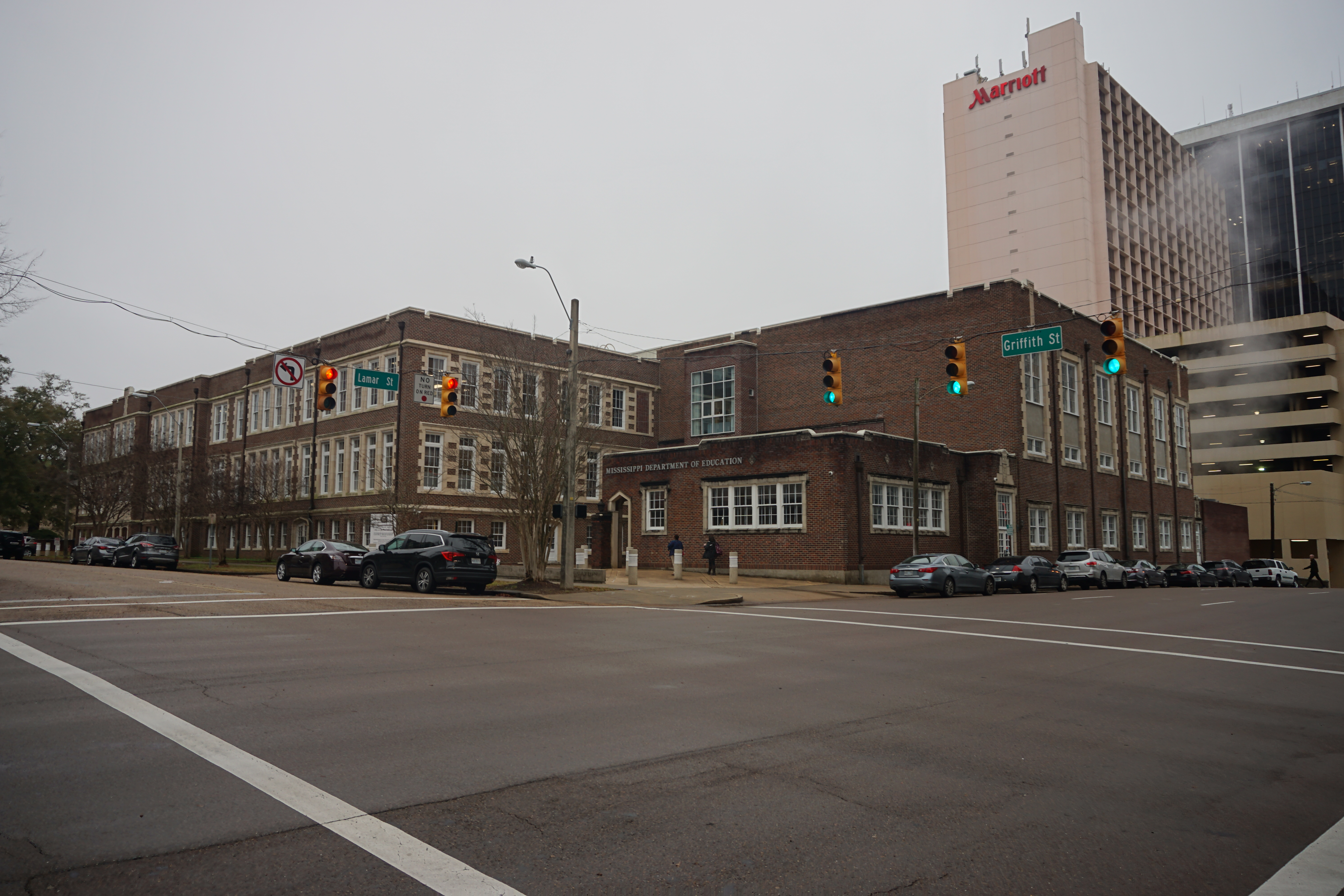
- Former school building, now the Mississippi Department of Education headquarters

Location
- 259 North West Street; Jackson, Mississippi 39201; United States; 32.3022°N 90.1848°W

Information
- Type: Public high school
- Established: 1888
- School district: Jackson Public School District
- Grades: 9–12

Central High School was a public high school in Jackson, Mississippi, United States. It was established in 1888 and was part of the Jackson Public School District. Its building currently serves as the headquarters of the Mississippi Department of Education (MDE).

== History ==
Central High School was established in 1888. It was an all-white school until the fall of 1966, when the first African-American students attended the school. Jackson schools integrated by law ended as per Derek Jerome Singleton vs. the Jackson Public School District, decided in 1969.

"jewels in the crown of white Jackson back before forced integration—in a time when white conservatives abundantly funded public schools and extracurricular activities with tax money for their own"

— Donna Ladd in an article in the Jackson Free Press

In 1907, the foundation for the present Central High School building was laid. Jackson Grade School became known as Central High School – all grammar grades having been removed. At its conception, Central offered classes through 10th grade. By 1908, the 11th grade was added, and the graduating class consisted of 6 students. Finally in 1910, Central had a 12 year school with graduates.

Also in 1910, the Quadruplane was published as Central High School’s first yearbook.

Central High’s growth continued causing rebuilding and enlargements in the years 1911, 1915, 1925 and 1936. A portion of the original 1911 structure still exists. The 1925 changes included moving the Greek columns from the front of the building and adding a floor in addition to the still existing towers.

The 1925 changes to Old Central High School make it the finest example of Tudor Gothic or “Jacobian” institutional architecture in Mississippi. Other examples of the style, such as the Old Starkville High School of 1927, the Old Hattiesburg High School of 1921, and the Old Greenwood Public Library of 1914, are smaller or less ornate.

Among its Tudor Gothic features are the battlemented turrets, the prominent bay window over the central entrance, the battlemented turrets, and the contrasting stone copings, trim, and window surrounds. All these features derived from the design of Hampton Court – King Henry VIII’s grand palace, built around 1520.

The Tudor Gothic style was favored for educational facilities in the early 20th century because of its association with the great English Universities and the culture of Shakespearean England.

With its tree-shaded lawn and generous set-back from North West Street, Central High School possesses a stately park-like landscape second only to that of the New Capitol Building.

Claude H. Lindsley, a Jackson architect whose practice was most active in the 1920s, was the designer of Central High School. Lindsley designed several of Jackson’s most prominent buildings, including the Tower Building (Standard Life Building), the state’s Art Deco commercial building built in 1929, and the Hinds County Courthouse, built in the 1930s.

The courthouse underwent restoration and enlargement in 1988-89 and now is regarded as a showplace among Mississippi county courthouses. Another of Lindsley’s designs was the Robert E. Lee Hotel, which has also been renovated and serves admirably in its new function as a state office building.

Prior renovations took the 137,500 square foot structure through a metamorphosis of style from Romanesque to neoclassical to Tudor Gothic. The gymnasium and band hall were added in 1936.

In 1892, a 2,500 pound bell cast in Cincinnati was placed in the bower of Central High School. When the building was demolished and the new high school built, the bell went to the fire station where it served as a fire alarm until 1931. In that year, an electric alarm system was installed, and the bell was taken from the fire station bower, and placed on the front of the building where it remained until the CHS Seniors of 1937-1938 decided to return it to Central High School. The seniors took this on as their class project, placing the bell on a concrete base on the south side of the front school campus. Today, the bell is once again located at the Jackson Central Fire Station on the corner of Pearl and President Streets. That building now houses the Jackson Chamber of Commerce. Hopefully, in the future, the bell will again return to its rightful home – Central High School.

Due to a continuing drop in enrollment, in May 1977, Central High School officially closed its doors. The desegregation of schools was the major factor in the decline of students attending Central High School.

In August 2015, smoke from a fire in a nearby hotel, as well as water resulting from the incident, damaged the Central High building, so the Mississippi Department of Education temporarily moved its headquarters to the South Pointe Business Park in Clinton. The headquarters was scheduled to move back on July 25, 2016.

== Notable alumni ==
- Frank Kinard, football player, coach
- Multiple Governors of Mississippi
- Eudora Welty, short story writer and novelist
