= William Belton Murrah =

American Bishop

William Belton Murrah (1852-1925) was an American bishop in the Methodist Episcopal Church, South, elected in 1910.

== Biography ==
Born in Pickensville, Alabama, he was educated at Southern University (now Birmingham–Southern College) in Greensboro, Alabama, and at Centenary College in Jackson, Louisiana. In 1897 Murrah received the LL.D. degree from Wofford College in South Carolina.

Prior to his election to the episcopacy, he served from 1890 till 1910 as the first President of Millsaps College in Jackson, Mississippi.

Murrah High School in Jackson and Murrah Hall on the Millsaps campus were both named after William B. Murrah. William B. Murrah was the first president of Millsaps college.

Murrah was also a founding member of the Alpha Iota chapter of Pi Kappa Alpha fraternity at Millsaps College.

Bishop Murrah died 5 March 1925. He is buried at Jackson, Mississippi.

== See also ==
- List of bishops of the United Methodist Church
