= Wingfield High School =

Location
- 1985 Scanlon Dr; Jackson, Hinds, Mississippi 39204-4419; United States; 32°16′51″N 90°14′30″W

Information
- School type: Public
- Established: 1966
- Status: Closed
- Closed: 2024
- School district: Jackson Public Schools
- NCES School ID: 280219000423
- Principal: Roderick Smith
- Teaching staff: 44.55 (FTE)
- Grades: 9–12
- Enrollment: 608 (2022–23)
- Student to teacher ratio: 13.65
- Colors: Royal blue and gold
- Sports: Boys Sports Football Cross Country Basketball Track Soccer Baseball Tennis Golf Girls Sports Basketball Track Soccer Slow Pitch Softball Tennis Golf Volleyball
- Mascot: Falcon
- Team name: Mighty Falcons
- Feeder schools: Peeples Middle School, Whitten Middle School
- Website: www.jackson.k12.ms.us/wingfield

O.H. Wingfield High School was a public high school located in Jackson, Mississippi, United States. It was part of the Jackson Public School District. Almost 900 children from South Jackson attended Wingfield High School in grades 9–12, as well as over 70 administration and staff. The principal of Wingfield was Roderick Smith. The school closed in May 2024.

The mascot of Wingfield was the falcon.

== Demographics ==
There were a total of 859 students enrolled at Wingfield during the 2011–2012 school year. The gender makeup of the district was 49% female and 51% male. The racial makeup of the school was 97.35% African American and 2.65% White.

== History ==
In 1966 the school opened.

On November 12, 1982, an 18-year-old dropout James Hartzog armed with a 20-gauge shotgun killed his girlfriend, 17-year-old Faye Williams, in her algebra class at Wingfield High School. Hartzog then killed himself.

In 2008 enrollment was about 1,200. Circa 2017, the enrollment count was 1,100. Pam Dinkins of the Clarion Ledger stated that rumors that Wingfield would close had circulated for years in the Jackson community.

The school district stated that the number of students and the amount of money in the system declined, and therefore it decided to close 11 schools after Spring 2024, with Wingfield being the sole high school closed. At the time it closed, the high school had 594 students.

Scott Simmons of WAPT-TV stated that two schools that were likely to receive Wingfield students were Forest Hill High School and Jim Hill High School.

New Horizon Church International expressed interest in buying the Wingfield site.

== Feeder pattern ==
The following schools fed into Wingfield High School, prior to its closure.

- Middle Schools
  - Peeples Middle School
  - Whitten Middle School
- Elementary Schools
  - Key Elementary School
  - Lester Elementary School
  - Marshall Elementary School
  - Sykes Elementary School
  - Wilkins Elementary School
