= Mississippi Department of Education =

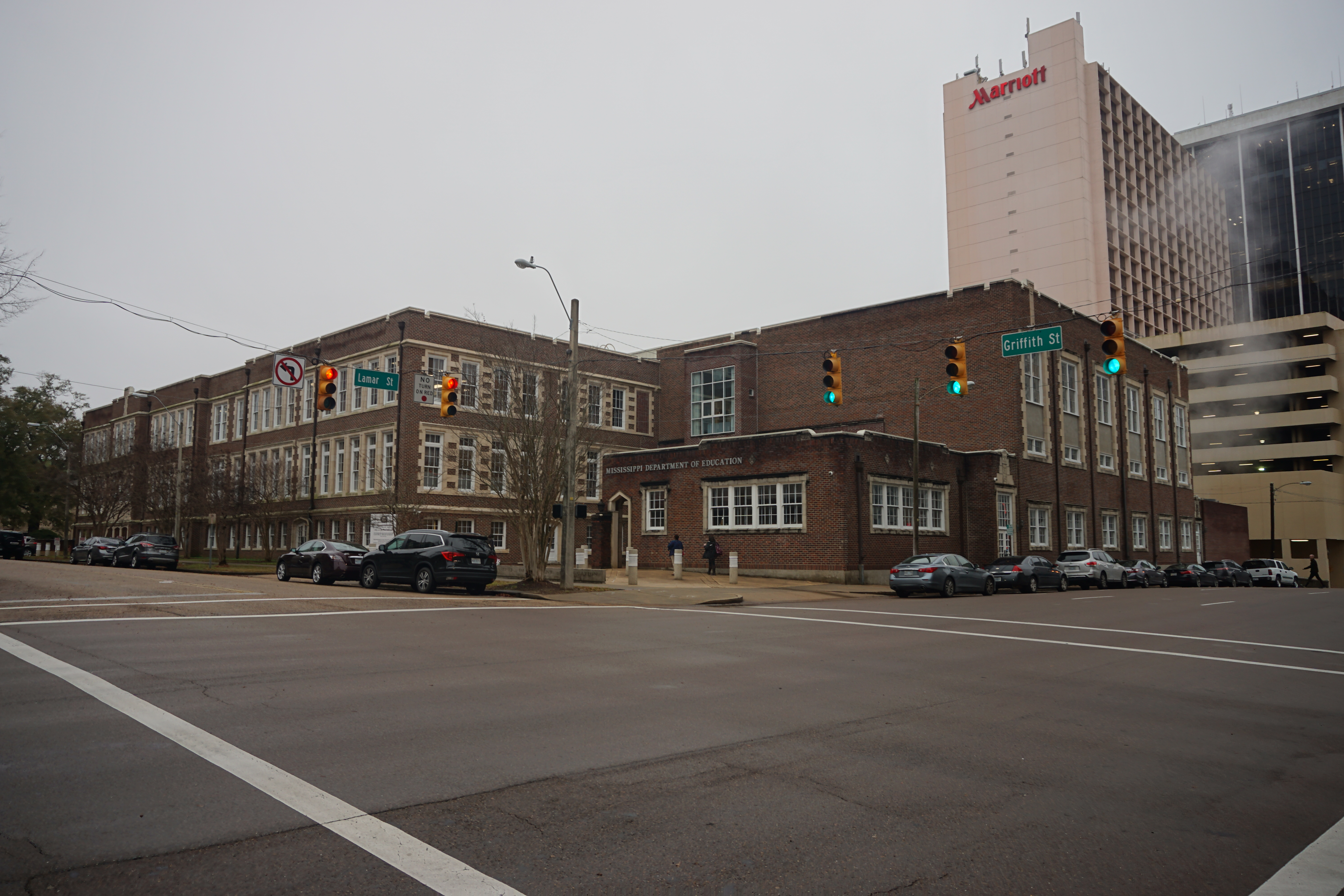
The former Central High School, the MDE headquarters building in Jackson, Mississippi

The Mississippi Department of Education (MDE) is the state education agency of Mississippi. It is headquartered in the former Central High School Building at 359 North West Street in Jackson.

The State Superintendent of Education is Dr. Lance Evans

== Operations ==
In August 2015 smoke from a fire in a nearby hotel, as well as water resulting from the incident, damaged the Central High building, so the MDE temporarily moved its headquarters to the South Pointe Business Park in Clinton. The headquarters were scheduled to move back on July 25, 2016.

== Structure ==
=== State Superintendent ===
The constitution designates the state superintendent the chief administrative officer of the Department of Education.

=== Mississippi Board of Education ===
The Mississippi Board of Education is responsible for setting public education policy, monitoring school funding and appointing the State Superintendent of Education. The nine-member Board is appointed according to the rules in the Mississippi Constitution.

== Superintendents ==
- Henry R. Pease (1869–1873)
- Thomas Cardozo (1873–1876)
- Thomas S. Gathright (1876)
- James Argyle Smith (1877–1885)
- J. R. Preston (1885–1895)
- Andrew Armstrong Kincannon (1896–1898)
- Henry L. Whitfield (1898–1900)
- Joseph Neely Powers
- William H. "Corn Club" Smith
- Robert P. Taylor, nominated to be state superintendent of education and served in an interim capacity, but not confirmed by the Mississippi Senate in 2023
- Carey Wright

== See also ==
- Mississippi Miracle

== Works cited ==
- Winkle, John W. III (2014). The Mississippi State Constitution (second ed.). Oxford University Press. ISBN 9780199300631.
