= Provine High School =

Coordinates: 32°18′21″N 90°13′28″W

John W. Provine High School

Location
- 2400 Robinson Road; Jackson, Mississippi 39209; United States

Information
- Type: Public high school
- Established: 1956
- School district: Jackson Public School District
- Principal: Roderick Smith
- Teaching staff: 54.66 (FTE)
- Grades: 9–12
- Enrollment: 732 (2023–24)
- Student to teacher ratio: 13.39
- Campus: Urban
- Color
- Team name: Rams
- Website: www.jackson.k12.ms.us/Provine

John W. Provine High School is a public high school located in Jackson, Mississippi, United States. It is part of the Jackson Public School District. Nicknamed "Ram City", the school serves students in grades 9–12 in the West Jackson area. Students from the Northwest Hills Terrace, the Queens, Country Club Hills, and Westchester Hills subdivisions attend the school. The current principal is Dr. Shelita Brown

== History ==
The school was established in 1956.

In 1992, it was designated a service-learning school. Since then, various organizations in the school have participated in service-learning projects. These include collecting and disseminating canned goods to the needy, collecting toiletries and pillows to distribute to the elderly in nursing homes, tutoring and mentoring elementary school students, assisting Habitat for Humanity with building houses for the destitute, and participating in walk-a-thons.

== Demographics ==
There were a total of 1,179 students enrolled in Provine High during the 2006–07 school year. The gender makeup of the district was 49% female and 51% male. The racial makeup of the school was 100.00% African American.

== Feeder pattern ==
The following schools feed into Provine High School.

- Middle schools
  - Blackburn Middle School
- Elementary schools
  - Clausell Elementary School
  - John Hopkins Elementary School
  - Pecan Park Elementary School

== Notable alumni ==
- Charlie Anderson: former NFL player
- David Banner: rapper and producer
- Tommy Kelly: former NFL player
- Justin Reed: former NBA player
- Fred Smoot: former NFL player
- Savante Stringfellow: former Olympian
- Kendell Watkins: former NFL player
- Nanette Workman: singer-songwriter
