= Sam Williams (basketball, born 1924) =

American college basketball coach

Biographical details
- Born: June 29, 1924; Daingerfield, Texas, U.S.
- Died: October 15, 2012 (aged 88); McAllen, Texas, U.S.

Coaching career (HC unless noted)

Basketball
- 195?–1958: McAllen HS
- 1958–1973: Pan American

Baseball
- 1961: Pan American

Head coaching record
- Overall: 244–164 (college basketball); 7–16 (college baseball)

Accomplishments and honors

Championships
- Basketball; NAIA National championship (1963)

Awards
- NAIA National Coach of the Year (1964); UTPA Hall of Fame (2007); Rio Grande Valley Sports Hall of Fame

Walter "Sam" Williams (June 29, 1924 – October 15, 2012) was an American college basketball coach. He is considered an early pioneer of racial integration in the college game and is the University of Texas–Pan American's all-time leader in wins (244), including its only men's basketball national championship in 1962–63. Williams is referred to as the "Father of Broncs Basketball" at Texas Pan–American. He oversaw the school's transition from a National Association of Intercollegiate Athletics (NAIA) program into an NCAA Division I program. During his 15 year tenure, he had 11 winning seasons, 4 20-win seasons, and 244 total victories. He also coached the baseball team for one season.

The UTPA Fieldhouse, where the team plays their home games, had its center court rededicated to Williams on November 20, 2010. He was also named head coach emeritus, becoming just the second former coach at Texas Pan–American to earn that honor (baseball coach Al Ogletree was the first).

Williams died on October 15, 2012, from natural causes.

== Head coaching record ==
=== Basketball ===
Record table
Season	Team	Overall	Conference	Standing	Postseason
Pan American Broncs (Big State Conference) (1958–1962)
1958–59	Texas Pan-American	12–11	3–5		
1959–60	Texas Pan-American	17–9	3–5		
1960–61	Texas Pan-American	15–16	5–3		
1961–62	Texas Pan-American	24–6	9–1		NAIA second round
Texas–Pan American Broncs (Independent) (1962–1973)
1962–63	Texas-Pan American	25–6			NAIA champions
1963–64	Texas-Pan American	28–6			NAIA Runner-up
1964–65	Texas-Pan American	19–7			
1965–66	Texas-Pan American	15–12			
1966–67	Texas-Pan American	15–9			
1967–68	Texas-Pan American	21–6			NCAA College Division second round
1968–69	Texas-Pan American	9–16			
1969–70	Texas-Pan American	8–16			
1970–71	Texas-Pan American	13–3			
1971–72	Texas-Pan American	17–7			
1972–73	Texas-Pan American	4–22			
Texas Pan American:		244–160	24–12		
Total:		244-160			
National champion Postseason invitational champion Conference regular season champion Conference regular season and conference tournament champion Division regular season champion Division regular season and conference tournament champion Conference tournament champion

=== Baseball ===
Record table
Season	Team	Overall	Conference	Standing	Postseason
Pan American Broncs (Independent) (1961–1961)
1961	Pan American	7–16			
Total:		7–16			
National champion Postseason invitational champion Conference regular season champion Conference regular season and conference tournament champion Division regular season champion Division regular season and conference tournament champion Conference tournament champion
