= UT Rio Grande Valley Vaqueros =

- University: University of Texas Rio Grande Valley
- Nickname: Vaqueros
- NCAA: Division I (FCS)
- Conference: Southland (primary); Ohio Valley (men's soccer); MPSF (women's swimming and diving)
- Athletic director: Chasse Conque
- Location: Edinburg, Texas
- Varsity teams: 16 (8 men's, 8 women's)
- Football stadium: Robert and Janet Vackar Stadium
- Basketball arena: UTRGV Fieldhouse
- Baseball stadium: UTRGV Baseball Stadium
- Soccer stadium: UTRGV Soccer and Track & Field Complex
- Tennis venue: Orville Cox Tennis Center
- Colors: Orange and gray
- Website: goutrgv.com
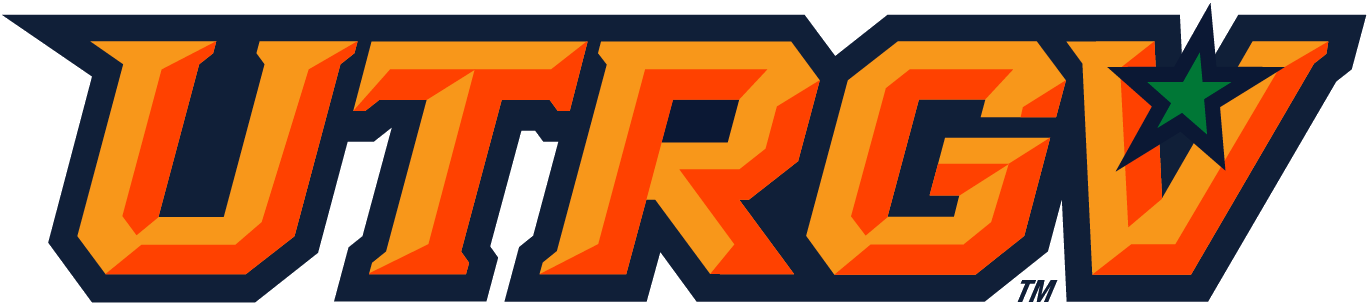

The UT Rio Grande Valley Vaqueros (often referred to as the UT–Rio Grande Valley Vaqueros, Rio Grande Vaqueros or the UTRGV Vaqueros) is a collegiate athletic program that represents the University of Texas Rio Grande Valley (UTRGV). The Vaqueros inherited the NCAA Division I status of the Texas–Pan American Broncs and were full members of the Western Athletic Conference through the 2023–24 school year In March 2024, it was reported that the Vaqueros would leave the WAC for the Southland Conference, beginning in the 2024–25 academic year.

== Conference affiliations ==
- Western Athletic Conference (2013–2024)
- Southland Conference (2024–present)

== Varsity teams ==
A member of the Southland Conference, UTRGV sponsors teams in eight men's and eight women's NCAA sanctioned sports:

Men's sports	Women's sports
Baseball	Basketball
Basketball	Cross country
Cross country	Golf
Football	Soccer
Golf	Tennis
Soccer	Track & Field†
Tennis	Volleyball
Track & Field†	Swimming & Diving
† – Track and field includes both indoor and outdoor.

== National championships ==
=== Team ===
Association	Sport	Year	Opponent/Runner-up	Score/Points
NAIA (6)	Men's Tennis (5)	1961	Southeastern State	29–10
NAIA (6)	Men's Tennis (5)	1962	Southeastern State	29–11
NAIA (6)	Men's Tennis (5)	1963	East Texas State	31–16
NAIA (6)	Men's Tennis (5)	1964	Corpus Christi	33–30
NAIA (6)	Men's Tennis (5)	1965	East Texas State	29–15
NAIA (6)	Basketball (1)	1963	Western Carolina	73–62

== Program history ==
=== Men's basketball ===
UTPA, then Pan American College, won the 1963 NAIA Division I men's basketball tournament under Coach Sam Williams. Lucious "Luke" Jackson was one of the players on that championship team. Jackson was selected 4th overall during the 1964 NBA draft. He was selected to the 1964–65 NBA All-Rookie Team and played in the NBA All-Star Game that same year. He played his entire career with the Philadelphia 76ers.

The basketball program, during the mid-1970s was coached by Abe Lemons. Under Lemons, the program had very successful seasons but, lamentably, failed to get invited to any NCAA tournaments. Coach Lemons was later hired away by the University of Texas at Austin.

Upon Lemons' departure to the University of Texas at Austin, Bill White was named the head basketball coach. While at Pan American, Coach White led the Broncs to their first post-season tournament play at the Division I level. During the 1980–81 season, Pan American earned a berth to the 1981 National Invitation Tournament. The Broncs lost to the 1981 NIT champs, the University of Tulsa Golden Hurricane.

The basketball program was also later coached by Lon Kruger, who later went on to coach at Kansas State, Florida, Illinois, UNLV, and Oklahoma. He also coached the Atlanta Hawks of the NBA.

=== Women's basketball ===
The Vaqueros began play for women's basketball in 1982. Their 10–5 record in NAIA play was their only winning season until 2014-15, when they finished 19–15 in their final season as the Broncs. They finished their season in the WAC title game, though they lost to New Mexico State 70–52. They were invited to the WBI, their first ever postseason appearance in school history. They lost to Louisiana-Lafayette 78–56 in the first round. The next year, they finished 18–13, marking the first time in program history that they had consecutive winning seasons. Though they lost in the WAC title game to New Mexico State again, they were invited to the WBI, where they lost to TCU 97–73.

=== Volleyball ===
On November 19, 2016, the UTRGV Women's Volleyball Team defeated the Utah Valley Woman's Volleyball team, making them the Western Athletic Conference (WAC) Volleyball Champions of 2016.

=== Baseball ===
The UTPA baseball squad placed 4th in the 1971 College World Series under Coach Al Ogletree.

=== Tennis ===
The UTPA Tennis program won several NAIA championships (doubles and singles) from 1959 through 1962 under Coach Don Russell, who himself captured several championships while playing and coaching the team. Other prominent Bronc champions included John Sharpe and George Kon, with Sharpe and Russell winning three consecutive doubles titles together from 1959 to 1961.

=== Football ===
On January 14, 2021, news broke that UTRGV had explored to create a football program for NCAA Division I Football Championship Subdivision level competition by 2024. At the time, it was believed that the program would compete as part of the newly reinstated football conference within the Western Athletic Conference (WAC). On December 11, 2022, Travis Bush was hired to be the first head coach of UTRGV.

UTRGV has since delayed the start of varsity football to the 2025 season, though it plans to play an exhibition schedule in 2024. The school purchased H-E-B Park – later renamed to Robert and Janet Vackar Stadium – in 2024 to be the primary home of the football team in 2025. Sams Memorial Stadium will also host a game each year.

The WAC merged its football league with that of the ASUN Conference (since reverted to its past name Atlantic Sun Conference) to create the United Athletic Conference (UAC) in 2023. However, the UTRGV athletic program was moved to the Southland Conference (SLC) before the football team ever played a game as a UAC member.

=== Conference history ===
After becoming a four-year college in 1952, the Broncs were members of the NAIA until the 1962–63 season. The Broncs were an independent in the first year of NAIA membership. From the 1953–54 season to the 1961–62 season, the teams were members of the Big State Conference. In 1962–63, the team had a dual membership in the NAIA and NCAA College Division. The Broncs began transitioning to the NCAA University Division in 1965–66 with the tennis team. The men's basketball began its transition in 1968–69. Broncs men's basketball participated as an Independent until the 1979–80 season when the team was a member of the Trans America Athletic Conference (now known as the Atlantic Sun Conference) and returned to independent status until 1986–87. UTPA joined the American South Conference as a charter member in 1987 and remained a member until the American South Conference merged with the Sun Belt Conference in 1991. The Broncs left the Sun Belt Conference at the end of the 1997–98 season and returned to independent status.

In 2008 it was announced that the Broncs would be charter members of the previously football-only Great West Conference when it began all-sports play in 2008. During the fall of 2008, the UTPA Cross Country team was the first to win a Great West Conference team title. UTPA exited Great West Conference after the 2012–2013 season.

The UTPA Broncs were one of the newest members of the Western Athletic Conference (WAC). Men's soccer returned to the athletic program in 2015, and women's soccer started in 2014.

Football will play an exhibition-only season in 2024 before starting full varsity play in the Southland Conference in 2025.
