= UT Rio Grande Valley Vaqueros baseball =

- 2026 UT Rio Grande Valley Vaqueros baseball team
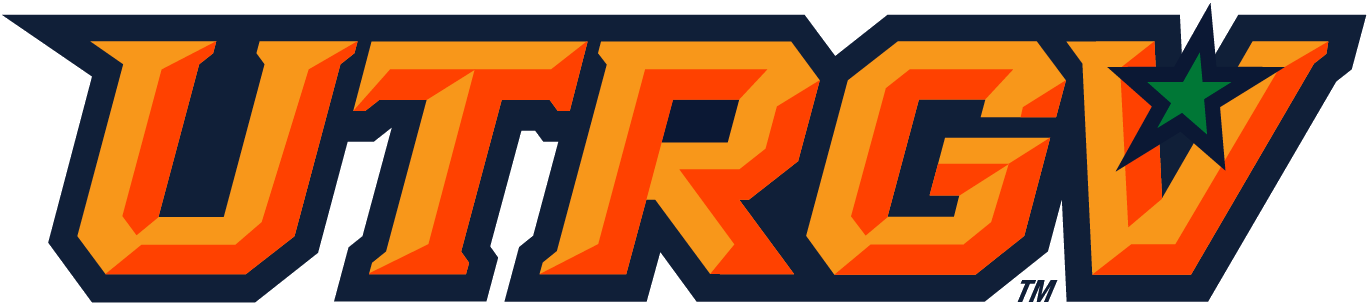
- University: University of Texas Rio Grande Valley
- Head coach: Derek Matlock (9th season)
- Conference: Southland
- Location: Edinburg, Texas
- Home stadium: UTRGV Baseball Stadium (Capacity: 4,000)
- Nickname: Vaqueros
- Colors: Orange and gray

College World Series appearances
- 1971

NCAA tournament appearances
- 1968, 1970, 1971, 1972, 1973, 1974, 1975, 1976, 1978, 1979, 1980, 1983, 1986

Conference regular season champions
- 2019, 2025

The UT Rio Grande Valley Vaqueros baseball team, or the UTRGV Vaqueros, is the varsity intercollegiate baseball team of the University of Texas Rio Grande Valley, an NCAA Division I institution with several campuses in the Rio Grande Valley of South Texas, United States. UTRGV was formally founded in 2013 with the announced merger of the University of Texas–Pan American (UTPA), with its main campus in Edinburg, and the University of Texas at Brownsville (UTB) in Brownsville, with the merged university beginning operation in the 2015–16 school year. The Vaqueros compete in the Southland Conference since 2025 and play home games at UTRGV Baseball Stadium in Edinburg. They are coached by Derek Matlock.

Prior to the merger, UTPA competed in Division I as the Texas–Pan American Broncs, while UTB, a member of the National Association of Intercollegiate Athletics, had no baseball program. In 2014, the University of Texas System announced that UTRGV would directly inherit the UTPA athletic program, including UTPA's WAC membership.

== History ==
=== Beginnings (1955–1968) ===
The Broncs began play in 1955, with Jim Brooks (who had been athletic director since 1952) serving as head coach for the inaugural season. He led the Broncs to a 5–10 record. John Donnelly was hired prior to the next season, and he coached the team for two seasons, going 19–16. Red Connor took over in 1959, also coaching for just two seasons, going 24–15. Sam Williams (the coach for the basketball team) served as coach for the 1961 season, going 7–16. Earl Gartman, previously a coach for football and baseball at Howard (now known as Samford) was hired in 1962 (the same year that Pan-American had membership in both NAIA and NCAA Division II), coaching them for two seasons before leaving to serve as head coach for the high school football team at Los Fresnos, going 20–16.

In 1964, Chuck Young was hired to coach the team. In his first year, he led them to a 19–8 record while the team was invited to the NAIA playoffs. In the District 8 playoffs, they beat the University of Dallas in three games to advance to the Texas Championships against Sam Houston. They were swept in two games. The following year, he led them to a 16–10 record, with the team advancing to the playoffs once again. They swept Austin College and Texas Southern in two games each to advance to the Championships again. They were swept again by the Bearkats. The program began shifting to NCAA Division I along with the rest of the sports teams starting in 1965. In 1966, Larry Ensminger was hired to coach the team. He led them to winning seasons in each of his three years, with the last being an 18–12 season that led to the Broncs being invited to the 1968 NCAA University Division baseball tournament. They played Texas at the District 6 Finals in Austin, Texas. They were beaten in three games by the Longhorns.

=== Al Ogletree era (1969–1997) ===
In 1969, Al Ogletree was hired by Brooks to coach the team, going 24–11 in his first season. In 1970, he led them to the 1970 NCAA University Division baseball tournament, where they beat Arkansas State to get to the District 6 Finals, where the Longhorns beat them in two games. The following year was the best for the team in overall success. They went 44–9 while going to the 1971 NCAA University Division baseball tournament for the second straight year. They swept the two-game series against Texas, beating them 1–0 and 4–0 to advance to the College World Series for the first time in school history. Although they lost their first game to Southern Illinois, they managed to win the next two games in the Loser's Bracket over Seton Hall and Harvard to reach the Semifinals. They were beaten 8–6 by Southern Illinois. Notable players on the team include Wayne Tyrone and Jim Tyrone, with the latter hitting .349 in 52 games with 37 RBIs. Ogletree was named College Coach of the Year by both The Sporting News and the South Plains Professional Scouts Association. The appearance in the College World Series remains the only appearance for the team. The Broncs made the Tournament consecutively for the next five seasons from 1972 to 1976, with the 1975 team winning 63 games, although they were beaten by Texas in the South Central Regional Finals 9–2, with two losses in the Finals in other years also caused by Texas.

Tragedy struck the team on February 24, 1973, when Jody Ramsey was killed in an electrical accident while working on construction of the new baseball stadium being built for the team. The previous season, Ramsey (in his only season with the Broncs) had hit for .346 in 56 games, with 47 runs, 64 hits and 17 stolen bases while leading the team in numerous categories. Petitions from students to the Board of Regents led to the park being named after Ramsey, with 1974 being the first season that the Broncs began play in Jody Ramsey Memorial Stadium. His jersey number of 6 was taken out of circulation by Ogletree for the rest of his tenure as manager. The Broncs would play in the stadium from 1974 to 2000, with it being dismantled three years later to make way for an educational building.

After a lull in 1977, they were invited back to the Tournament in 1978, coming back two more times, although they failed to reach the Finals. The Broncs returned to the Tournament in 1983 after going 64–19–1, a program record for wins. In the Central Regional, they lost to Texas in the Semifinals, who went on to win the College World Series that year. Olgetree led them back to the Tournament in 1986 with a 42–19 record. In the Central Regional, they were beaten by Pepperdine 11–0, which sent them to the Loser's Bracket. They beat San Diego State 10–6 to survive a bit longer, but a loss to Texas 9–5 eliminated them from the Regional. As of 2018, this remains their final appearances in the NCAA tournament. In 1988, the Broncs joined the American South Conference, where they played for four seasons. Olgetree led the team to a 126–99 record over those years, but they went 24–28 in conference play. The Broncs joined the Sun Belt Conference in 1992. Ogletree coached the team for six more seasons, having low moments such as an 11–39 record in 1994 and 17–37 in 1995 along with going 48–95 in Sun Belt play over six years along with going 135–184, but he managed to lead them to a 30–22 record in 1997, a winning season for the first time since 1992 along with a 14–12 conference record, their first winning season in conference play. Ogletree retired after the season, having won over 1,000 games for the team. In his first twenty seasons (1969 to 1989), he led them to a season of .500 or better in each of those seasons, with only five losing seasons in 29 seasons of coaching.

=== Reggie Tredaway era (1998–2002) ===
Reggie Tredaway, former third baseman for the Broncs and assistant coach for the team, was hired to coach the team in 1998. In his first season, he led them to an 18–32 record, the fifth losing season in nine seasons. This was their last season in the Sun Belt. Tredaway led the Broncs to improvement in his next two seasons, going 30–23 and 31–19–1, but neither season resulted in postseason play. The team faltered in his next two years, going 12–40 and 15–38. He announced his retirement after the 2002 season.

=== Willie Gawlik era (2003–2008) ===
In 2003, Willie Gawlik was hired as head coach. Gawlik, a former Bronc player from the 1971 CWS team, had served as coach at Texas Wesleyan (1996–2001) and Central Arkansas (2002) prior to the hiring. In six seasons at the helm with the Broncs, he never led them to a winning season, reaching a high of 24 wins (with 29 losses) in 2006 while having two seasons of under 20 wins, with a 40–138 record in road games. After a 21–35 season and amidst complaints from players over his coaching along with conflicts between coaches and players, the university decided to not renew his contract, while firing two assistant coaches. Gawlik has the third lowest winning percentage as coach of the program and the lowest for any coach that had coached more than one season.

=== Manny Mantrana era (2009–2017) ===
In 2009, Manny Mantrana was hired as head coach. He had formerly served as head coach of St. Thomas University, coaching them from 1997 to 2008. In his first season, the Broncs went 14–41. Texas–Pan American moved to the Great West Conference after the season. The Broncs improved the following year, going 22–33 with a 9–18 conference record while finishing 6th in the eight team conference. In the 2010 Great West Conference baseball tournament, the Broncs lost to Northern Colorado 10–0 while beating their other two opponents (NYIT and NJIT), but the loss served as the tiebreaker, eliminating them from a bid in the Finals, which were held in the home stadium of the Broncs. The 2011 team faltered to a 21–32 record, the 11th straight losing season for the program.

The 2012 season proved to be a step up for the team, as they finished 30–22 with a 16–12 conference record, finishing 2nd in the conference behind Utah Valley (who won all 28 conference games). In the 2012 Great West Conference baseball tournament, they beat Chicago State 10–4 to get to the Second Round, but they were beaten by North Dakota 18–7 to fall to the Loser Bracket. A subsequent loss to Northern Colorado 14–13 eliminated the Broncs. They went 28–30 in the following year while going 17–10 in Great West play to finish 3rd. In the 2013 Great West Conference baseball tournament, they beat NYIT 7–6, but they lost 3–1 to Houston Baptist (the eventual champion), with a subsequent loss in the Loser Bracket to Chicago State knocking them out of the tournament. The conference soon dissolved, and the Broncs moved to the Western Athletic Conference for the 2014 season. Mantrana led them to a 27–30 record and a 17–10 conference record for a third-place finish. In the 2014 Western Athletic Conference baseball tournament, the Broncs lost 9–2 in the Second Round to Utah Valley, with a 7–4 loss in the Loser Bracket to New Mexico State knocking them out of the tournament. The team tumbled in 2015, going 21–30–1 and 6–20–1 in WAC play to finish 10th. The Broncs became the Vaqueros after the season ended. He led the team to a 21–28 record in 2016 and 26–28 in 2017, finishing 8th each time in the WAC. On May 24, 2017, Mantrana stepped down as coach, while staying at UTRGV to serve as the Special Assistant to the athletic director.

=== Derek Matlock era (2018-present) ===
In June 2017, UTRGV announced the hiring of Derek Matlock as the new head coach of the team. Matlock had previously served as recruiting coordinator and pitching coach for West Virginia for the previous five seasons, along with serving at the same position for Texas State from 2007 to 2012. On May 18, 2019, the Vaqueros clinched a share of the WAC regular season title, finishing 1st along with California Baptist and New Mexico State. UTRGV finished the regular season 34–19 with a 18–9 conference record. It is the first conference title of any sort since 1955, with the wins being the most in one season since winning 37 in 1991. The 2021 team advanced all the way to the WAC Tournament Final, losing to Grand Canyon.

In 2025, the Vaqueros entered the Southland Conference. In their first season there, they won a share of the regular season championship and were seeded as the 2nd seed in the Southland Tournament.

== All-time season results ==
Results accurate as of the beginning of the 2025 season.

| Season | Record (Conference record) | Pct. | Coach |
|---|---|---|---|
| 1955 | 5–10 | .333 | Jim Brooks |
| 1956 | 2–14 | .125 | John Donnelly |
| 1958 | 17–2 | .895 | John Donnelly |
| 1959 | 10–4 | .714 | Red Connor |
| 1960 | 14–11 | .560 | Red Connor |
| 1961 | 7–16 | .304 | Sam Williams |
| 1962 | 7–9 | .438 | Earl Gartham |
| 1963 | 13–7 | .650 | Earl Gartham |
| 1964 | 19–8 | .704 | Chuck Young |
| 1965 | 16–10 | .615 | Chuck Young |
| 1966 | 15–10 | .600 | Larry Ensminger |
| 1967 | 18–16 | .529 | Larry Ensminger |
| 1968 | 18–12 | .600 | Larry Ensminger |
| 1969 | 24–11 | .686 | Al Ogletree |
| 1970 | 32–12 | .727 | Al Ogletree |
| 1971 | 44–9 | .830 | Al Ogletree |
| 1972 | 40–16 | .714 | Al Ogletree |
| 1973 | 31–17 | .646 | Al Ogletree |
| 1974 | 50–11 | .820 | Al Ogletree |
| 1975 | 63–7 | .900 | Al Ogletree |
| 1976 | 53–19 | .736 | Al Ogletree |
| 1977 | 44–30 | .595 | Al Ogletree |
| 1978 | 52–17 | .754 | Al Ogletree |
| 1979 | 52–12 | .812 | Al Ogletree |
| 1980 | 61–18 | .772 | Al Ogletree |
| 1981 | 32–22 | .593 | Al Ogletree |
| 1982 | 28–28 | .500 | Al Ogletree |
| 1983 | 64–19–1 | .768 | Al Ogletree |
| 1984 | 31–28 | .525 | Al Ogletree |
| 1985 | 39–20 | .661 | Al Ogletree |
| 1986 | 42–19 | .689 | Al Ogletree |
| 1987 | 40–20 | .667 | Al Ogletree |
| 1988 | 33–25 | .569 | Al Ogletree |
| 1989 | 26–27 | .491 | Al Ogletree |
| 1990 | 30–26 | .536 | Al Ogletree |
| 1991 | 37–21 | .638 | Al Ogletree |
| 1992 | 29–23 | .558 | Al Ogletree |
| 1993 | 23–33 | .411 | Al Ogletree |
| 1994 | 11–39 | .220 | Al Ogletree |
| 1995 | 17–37 | .315 | Al Ogletree |
| 1996 | 25–30 | .455 | Al Ogletree |
| 1997 | 30–22 | .577 | Al Ogletree |
| 1998 | 18–32 | .360 | Reggie Tredaway |
| 1999 | 30–23 | .566 | Reggie Tredaway |
| 2000 | 31–19–1 | .618 | Reggie Tredaway |
| 2001 | 12–40 | .231 | Reggie Tredaway |
| 2002 | 15–38 | .283 | Reggie Tredaway |
| 2003 | 21–33 | .389 | Willie Gawlik |
| 2004 | 22–31 | .415 | Willie Gawlik |
| 2005 | 15–39 | .278 | Willie Gawlik |
| 2006 | 24–29 | .453 | Willie Gawlik |
| 2007 | 17–39 | .304 | Willie Gawlik |
| 2008 | 21–35 | .375 | Willie Gawlik |
| 2009 | 14–41 | .255 | Manny Mantrana |
| 2010 | 22–33 (9–9) | .400 | Manny Mantrana |
| 2011 | 21–32 (10–8) | .396 | Manny Mantrana |
| 2012 | 30–22 (16–12) | .577 | Manny Mantrana |
| 2013 | 28–30 (17–10) | .483 | Manny Mantrana |
| 2014 | 27–30 (17–10) | .474 | Manny Mantrana |
| 2015 | 21–30–1 (6–20–1) | .413 | Manny Mantrana |
| 2016 | 26–28 (10–14) | .481 | Manny Mantrana |
| 2017 | 26–28 (7–17) | .429 | Manny Mantrana |
| 2018 | 23–31 (8–16) | .426 | Derek Matlock |
| 2019 | 34–21 (19–8) | .618 | Derek Matlock |
| 2020 | 11–7 (0–0) | .611 | Derek Matlock |
| 2021 | 32–26 (20–15) | .552 | Derek Matlock |
| 2022 | 33–25 (17–13) | .569 | Derek Matlock |
| 2023 | 30–26 (15–14) | .580 | Derek Matlock |
| 2024 | 29–25 (15–15) | .537 | Derek Matlock |
| Totals | | 1,815–1,488–3 | .549 |

== Major League Baseball ==
UTPA had 35 Major League Baseball draft selections from the start of the draft in 1965 until the 2015 merger that created UTRGV.

Vaqueros in the Major League Baseball Draft
| Year | Player | Round | Team |
|---|---|---|---|
| 1970 | Tony Barbosa | 16 | Angels |
| 1971 | Jim Tyrone | 7 | Cubs |
| 1972 | Andre Rabouin | 26 | Reds |
| 1972 | Wayne Tyrone | 20 | Cubs |
| 1975 | Joe Hernandez | 26 | Cubs |
| 1975 | Rick Brockaway | 21 | Cubs |
| 1979 | Dan Firova | 29 | Brewers |
| 1980 | Alan Maria | 18 | Mets |
| 1981 | Carlos Hidalgo | 27 | Expos |
| 1981 | Lonnie Garza | 7 | Angels |
| 1983 | Scott Cannon | 13 | Angels |
| 1983 | Jim Hickey | 13 | White Sox |
| 1983 | Mitchell Moran | 3 | Dodgers |
| 1984 | William Wilson | 25 | Cardinals |
| 1988 | Mike Eckert | 57 | Yankees |
| 1988 | Albert Molina | 36 | Pirates |
| 1988 | Herb Erhardt | 16 | Yankees |
| 1990 | Sid Holland | 45 | Rangers |
| 1991 | George Williams | 24 | Athletics |
| 1992 | Tim Jones | 18 | Tigers |
| 1992 | Michael Eiffert | 9 | Rockies |
| 1993 | Rodd Kurtz | 53 | Cubs |
| 1993 | Marc Ottmers | 5 | Cardinals |
| 1995 | Chuck Cox | 35 | Phillies |
| 1999 | Jason Bottenfield | 19 | Red Sox |
| 1999 | Joey Cole | 11 | Mets |
| 1999 | Omar Ortiz | 1 | Padres |
| 2000 | Mike Cox | 18 | Mets |
| 2001 | Levi Frary | 14 | Rockies |
| 2005 | Mark Rodriguez | 30 | Reds |
| 2006 | Tim Haines | 27 | Mets |
| 2006 | Roberto Gomez | 24 | Cardinals |
| 2012 | Angel Ibanez | 28 | Astros |
| 2013 | Dusten Knight | 28 | Giants |
| 2014 | Sam Street | 16 | Pirates |
| 2015 | Logan Landon | 10 | Dodgers |

Jose Garcia became the first player who played under the UTRGV name to be drafted. He was taken by the White Sox in 2017.

== Coaches ==
UTRGV has had twelve head coaches in its tenure.

| Coach | Years | Record | Pct. |
|---|---|---|---|
| Jim Brooks | 1955 | 5–10 | .333 |
| John Donnelly | 1956–1958 | 19–16 | .543 |
| Red Connor | 1959–1960 | 24–15 | .615 |
| Sam Williams | 1961 | 7–16 | .304 |
| Earl Gartman | 1962–1963 | 20–16 | .556 |
| Chuck Young | 1964–1965 | 35–18 | .660 |
| Larry Ensminger | 1966–1968 | 51–38 | .573 |
| Al Ogletree | 1969–1997 | 1,083–618–1 | .636 |
| Reggie Tredaway | 1998–2002 | 106–152–1 | .409 |
| Willie Gawlik | 2003–2008 | 120–206 | .368 |
| Manny Mantrana | 2009–2017 | 210–274–1 | .434 |
| Derek Matlock | 2018–present | 192–161 | .544 |

== Conference history ==
| Conference | Years |
|---|---|
| Independent | 1963–1987, 1999–2009 |
| Big State Conference | 1955–1962 |
| American South Conference | 1988–1991 |
| Sun Belt Conference | 1992–1998 |
| Great West Conference | 2010–2013 |
| Western Athletic Conference | 2014–2024 |
| Southland Conference | 2025–present |

== Postseason ==
The Vaqueros (then known as the Pan American Broncs) have made the NCAA Division I Baseball Championship thirteen times, with one appearance in the College World Series. They have a combined record of 15–26, with a 2–2 record in the College World Series as of 2026.

| Year | Region | Round | Opponent | Result |
|---|---|---|---|---|
| 1968 | District 6 | Finals | Texas | L 0–3; W 2–1; L 6–10 |
| 1970 | District 6 | Semifinals; Finals | Arkansas State; Texas | W 5–0; L 2–3; L 3–4 |
| 1971 | District 6 College World Series | Finals; First Round; Second Round; Third Round; Semifinals | Texas; Southern Illinois; Seton Hall; Harvard; Southern Illinois | W 1–0; W 4–0; L 4–5; W 8–2; W 1–0; L 6–8 |
| 1972 | District 6 | Semifinals; Finals | Trinity; Texas | W 6–1; L 0–1; L 1–2 |
| 1973 | District 6 | First Round; First Round; Second Round; Final | Texas; Arkansas; Trinity; Texas | L 1–7; W 4–2 ^{(10 inn.)} W 4–3 ^{(10 inn.)} L 12–14 ^{(10 inn.)} |
| 1974 | District 6 | Semifinals | Louisiana Tech; Texas | L 2–3; L 0–7 |
| 1975 | South Central Regionals | First Round; First Round; Second Round; Finals | South Alabama; Louisiana Tech; South Alabama; Texas | L 7–8; W 8–1; W 9–8; L 2–9 |
| 1976 | Midwest Regional | First Round | Arizona; Texas A&M | L 0–5; L 1–2 |
| 1978 | South Central Regionals | First Round; Second Round; Second Round | Louisiana Tech; Baylor; Mississippi State | W 7–0; L 2–3; L 5–7 |
| 1979 | Central Regionals | First Round; First Round | Texas; Brigham Young | L 2–4; L 5–11 |
| 1980 | Central Regionals | First Round; First Round | Hawaii; Texas | L 4–8; L 4–7 |
| 1983 | Central Regionals | First Round; Second Round; Third Round; Fourth Round | Grambling State; Northeastern Louisiana; Mississippi State; Texas | W 5–0; W 9–8; L 5–7; L 1–6 |
| 1986 | Central Regional | First Round; Second Round; Third Round | Pepperdine; San Diego State; Texas | L 0–11; W 10–6; L 5–9 |

=== NAIA ===
During their time in the National Association of Intercollegiate Athletics (NAIA), the Vaqueros appeared in the NAIA Tournament twice. They went a combined record of 6–6.

| Year | Region | Opponent | Result |
|---|---|---|---|
| 1964 | District 8 playoffs Texas Championships | Dallas; Sam Houston State | L 0–1; W 4–3; W 7–4; L 4–7; L 2–11 |
| 1965 | NAIA District 8 playoffs Texas Championships | Austin College; Texas Southern; San Houston State | W 11–0; W 6–2; W 14–1; W 8–3; L 1–3; L 2–3 |

== Retired numbers ==
UTRGV has retired two jersey numbers, with the latter being retired across all sports.

| No. | Player |
|---|---|
| 44 | Al Ogletree |
| 54 | Lucious Jackson |

== See also ==
- List of NCAA Division I baseball programs
