= Texas–Pan American Broncs =

- University: University of Texas–Pan American
- Nickname: Broncs
- NCAA: Division I
- Conference: Western Athletic Conference
- Athletic director: Chris King
- Location: Edinburg, Texas
- Varsity teams: 15
- Basketball arena: UTPA Fieldhouse
- Baseball stadium: Edinburg Stadium
- Soccer stadium: Future UTRGV Vaqueros Soccer Stadium
- Colors: Green and orange
- Website: www.utpabroncs.com

The Texas–Pan American Broncs (also UTPA) were the varsity athletic teams representing University of Texas–Pan American in Edinburg, Texas in intercollegiate athletics. The university sponsored 15 teams including men and women's basketball, cross country, golf, tennis, and track and field (indoor and outdoor); soccer and volleyball for women only; and baseball for men only. The last varsity sport to be established for the Broncs was women's soccer, added for the 2014 season (2014–15 school year), with men's soccer added in 2015, the year that the merger took place. The Broncs compete in the NCAA Division I and are currently members of the Western Athletic Conference.

The 2014–15 school year was the last season for UTPA as an institution. During summer 2015, UTPA merged with the University of Texas at Brownsville to create the new University of Texas Rio Grande Valley (UTRGV). The University of Texas System stated in July 2014 that "the UTPA athletics program will be converted into the athletics program at UTRGV".

On November 5, 2014, UTRGV's new nickname of Vaqueros was announced. Almost immediately, students on both campuses began objecting to the new name as a caricature and racial stereotype of Mexican, Latino, Chicano, and Hispanic culture. Two days after the new mascot was approved, the UTPA student government passed a resolution in opposition, and three days later, hundreds of students rallied on the Edinburg campus to protest the new name. However, the name was kept.

== Teams ==
The University of Texas–Pan American sponsored teams in seven men's and eight women's NCAA sanctioned sports, with women's soccer as the last addition in 2014.

Note that the NCAA classifies indoor and outdoor track and field as separate sports. However, when determining scholarship limits, it combines both forms of track and field with cross country.

Men's sports	Women's sports
Baseball	Basketball
Basketball	Cross Country
Cross country	Golf
Golf	Soccer
Tennis	Tennis
Track & Field	Track & Field
	Volleyball
† – Track and field includes both indoor and outdoor.

=== Program history ===
==== Men's basketball ====
UTPA, then Pan American College, won the 1963 NAIA national men's basketball championship under Coach Sam Williams. Lucious Jackson a/k/a Luscious "Luke" Jackson was one of the players on that championship team. Jackson was selected 4th overall during the 1964 NBA draft. He was selected to the 1964–65 NBA All-Rookie Team and played in the NBA All-Star Game that same year. He played his entire career with the Philadelphia 76ers.

The basketball program, during the mid-1970s was coached by Abe Lemons. Under Lemons, the program had very successful seasons but, lamentably, failed to get invited to any NCAA tournaments. Coach Lemons was later hired away by the University of Texas at Austin.

Upon Lemons' departure to the University of Texas at Austin, Bill White was named the head basketball coach. While at Pan American, Coach White led the Broncs to their first post-season tournament play at the Division I level. During the 1980–81 season, Pan American earned a berth to the 1981 National Invitation Tournament. The Broncs lost to the 1981 NIT champs, the University of Tulsa Golden Hurricane.

The basketball program was later coached by Lon Kruger, who later went on to coach at Kansas State, Florida, Illinois, UNLV, and Oklahoma. He also coached the Atlanta Hawks of the NBA.

==== Baseball ====
UTPA baseball squad placed 4th in the 1971 College World Series under Coach Al Ogletree.

=== Tennis ===
The program won several doubles NAIA championships from 1959 through 1962 under Coach Don Russell, who himself captured several championships while playing and coaching the team.

==== Conference history ====
After becoming a four-year college in 1952, the Broncs were members of the NAIA until the 1962–63 season. The Broncs were an independent in the first year of NAIA membership. From the 1953–54 season to the 1961–62 season, the teams were members of the Big State Conference. In 1962–63, the team had a dual membership in the NAIA and NCAA Division II. The Broncs began transitioning to NCAA Division I in 1965–66 with the tennis team. The men's basketball began its transition in 1968–69. Broncs men's basketball participated as an Independent until the 1979–80 season when the team was a member of the Trans-America Athletic Conference and returned to independent status until 1986–87. UTPA joined the American South Conference as a charter member in 1987 and remained a member until the American South Conference merged with the Sun Belt Conference in 1991. The Broncs left the Sun Belt Conference at the end of the 1997–98 season and returned to independent status.

In 2008 it was announced that the Broncs would be charter members of the previously football-only Great West Conference when it began all-sports play in 2008. During the fall of 2008, the UTPA Cross Country team was the first to win a Great West Conference team title. UTPA exited Great West Conference after the 2012–2013 season.

The UTPA Broncs were one of the newest members of the Western Athletic Conference (WAC). Women's soccer returned to the athletic program in 2014, and men's soccer will follow when UTRGV is created in 2015.
