= UTRGV (disambiguation) =

UTRGV is a public university in Edinburg, Texas.

UTRGV may also refer to:

- UTRGV Fieldhouse
- UTRGV Baseball Stadium
- UTRGV Soccer and Track & Field Complex
