= UT Rio Grande Valley Vaqueros men's basketball =

2026–27 UT Rio Grande Valley Vaqueros men's basketball team
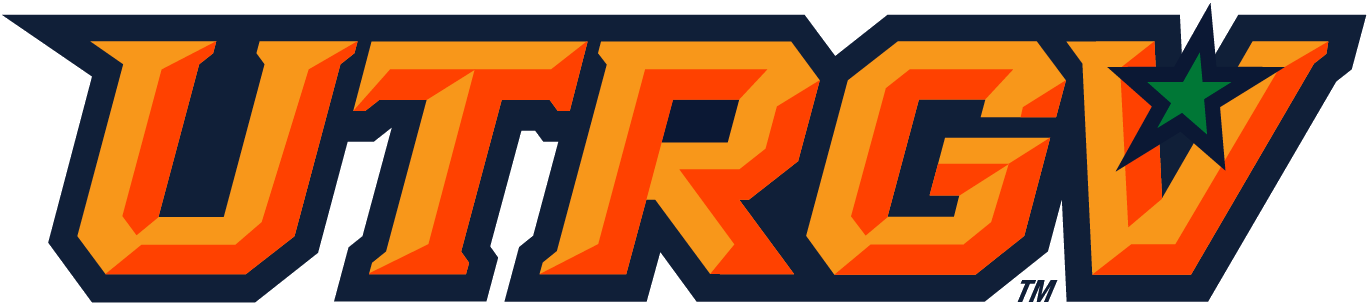
- University: University of Texas Rio Grande Valley
- Head coach: Brandon Chambers (1st season)
- Location: Edinburg, Texas
- Arena: UTRGV Fieldhouse (capacity: 2,500)
- Conference: Southland Conference
- Nickname: Vaqueros
- Colors: Orange and gray

NCAA Division II tournament Sweet Sixteen
- 1968

NCAA Division II tournament appearances
- 1968

NAIA tournament champions
- 1963
Other NAIA tournament results
Runner-up	1964
Semifinals	1963, 1964
Quarterfinals	1963, 1964

Uniforms
Home	Away

The UT Rio Grande Valley Vaqueros men's basketball team, or UTRGV Vaqueros, represents the University of Texas Rio Grande Valley in Edinburg, Texas, United States. The school's team competed in the Southland Conference since the 2024–25 season. They play their home games at the UTRGV Fieldhouse. The Vaqueros are one of 45 Division I programs to have never appeared in the NCAA Division I men's basketball tournament.

The team's current identity was established after the University of Texas at Brownsville and the University of Texas–Pan American (UTPA) were merged in 2015. The merged university inherited the athletic legacy of UTPA, including its WAC membership. Before the merger, UTPA's teams were known as the “Broncs.”

== History ==
=== Beginnings (1952–1958) ===
The Broncs first began play in 1952 under their then-current institutional identity of Pan American College, as a member of the National Association of Intercollegiate Athletics. In their first ever season (coached by L.A. Youngman), the Broncs finished 11–10. They joined the Big State Conference before the next season, but the Broncs finished 6–11 overall with an 0–6 conference record. Harry Meng took over the team the next two seasons, but he did not fare any better, going 2–20 and 4–20 in his two seasons. John Donnelly took over as coach, serving from 1956 to 1958, with his tenure marked by 4–16 and 5–14 records, respectively.

=== Sam Williams era (1959–1973) ===
Sam Williams took over the program in 1958. During that season, he led them to a 12–11 record, the first season with a winning record since 1952. The next year, he led them to a 17–9 record, and a 7–3 conference record, their first ever season with a winning conference record. Despite finishing with a 15–16 record, the Broncs made their first ever postseason appearance in 1961, playing in the NAIA District Playoffs. They were beaten in two games by Texas State, 83–64 and 73–72. In 1962, the Broncs finished with a 26–4 record. This time, the Broncs finally made their first NAIA Men's Basketball Tournament appearance after beating Texas State twice in a row, 71–68 and 67–61. The Broncs got to the second round before losing to the Ferris Institute. This was their final season in the Big State Conference, with the Broncs becoming an Independent after the season ended.

The Broncs finished 25–6 in the 1962–63 season. They beat McMurry 77–51 in the NAIA District Playoffs to make their second straight NAIA National Tournament appearance. The Broncs subsequently won the 1963 NAIA Division I men's basketball tournament, winning five games by an average margin of 20.4 points. Lucious Jackson was awarded the Chuck Taylor Most Valuable Player Award for his 93 rebounds in 5 games for an average of 18.6 rebounds per game.

The following year, the Broncs finished with a 28–6 record, the most victories the team ever had in a season. Once again, the Broncs prevailed in the NAIA District Playoffs, beating McMurray 86–81 to advance to the Tournament again. The Broncs went to the NAIA National Championship once again, but they lost to Rockhurst. Despite the loss, Lucious Jackson was awarded the Chuck Taylor Most Valuable Player Award once again, for his 67 rebounds in 5 games (for a 13.4 rebounds per game average) and his 124 total points for a 24.8 game average. In his three tournaments, he scored a total of 301 points and 180 rebounds. In 1965, the Broncs finished 19–7, but they failed to advance past the NAIA District Playoffs in three games, including the final game by one point in Edinburg. The following year, they finished 15–12, but lost in the NAIA District Playoffs again, this time to Midwestern State, 81–77 and 84–75. A 15–9 season the following year failed to yield another shot at the District Playoffs.

In 1968, the Broncs (which had become Pan American University in 1965) qualified for the 1968 NCAA College Division basketball tournament with a 21–6 record culminated by a 19–3 end to a season that had zero losses at home. They were placed in the Southwestern Region. They beat Jackson State 96–73 to reach the regional final and potentially be one of the last 16 teams in the national finals. However, they lost to Trinity in overtime, 87–83. This was their last Tournament appearance of any kind until 1981. Since 1962, the Broncs had dual membership with the NAIA and NCAA Division II, but they transitioned into Division I before the 1968–69 season. That year, the team fell to 9–16. The following year resulted in one less win, but the 1970–71 season bounced back to a 13–13 record; this was the team's first .500 record in Division I play. The team finished 17–7 the following year, but did not qualify for any postseason. The team fell to rock bottom in 1972–73, winning only 4 games in their worst season since 1956. This was the final season for Williams. During his 15-year tenure, Williams had led the team to 11 winning seasons, with four 20-win seasons. His 244 victories is still the most in program history. Decades later, the university rededicated the center court of the fieldhouse in honor of Williams.

=== Abe Lemons years (1973–1976) ===
Abe Lemons took over the program to begin the 1973 season, which ended with a 13–9 outcome. The following year, he led them to a 22–2 record, the most since the 1967 season. In his third (and last) season, he led them to a 20–5 record. After the season, he left to take the job at Texas.

=== Bill White era (1976–1982) ===
Bill White took over as coach to begin the 1976 season, and he led them to a 16–10 record. The following year, the team improved to a 22–4 record. After a 13–13 season in 1978, the team joined the Trans America Athletic Conference (now known as the Atlantic Sun Conference) for the 1979–80 season, going 20–8 and 4–2 in conference play. However, they reverted to Independent status after the season ended. In 1980, the Broncs finished 19–10, but the season was highlighted by victories over eventual champion Indiana, defending champion Marquette, and eventual Sweet Sixteen participant Wichita State. They appeared in the 1980 TAAC men's basketball tournament, beating Hardin–Simmons in the Quarterfinals, but losing to eventual conference champion Centenary in the semifinals. They were rewarded for their season with an appearance in the National Invitation Tournament. They lost to Tulsa 81–71. This was their last appearance in a postseason for the team until 2018, and it was also their final year in the TAAC before reverting to independence. After losing all five senior starters, the team finished 5–20 season the following year, and White was subsequently replaced by Lon Kruger.

=== Lon Kruger era (1982–1986) ===
Lon Kruger led the team to a 7–21 record in 1982, but they improved every subsequent season, to 13–14 in 1983, to 12–16 in 1984, to 20–8 in 1985. Kruger left for Kansas State after the season ended.

=== Kevin Wall era (1986–1992) ===
In Wall's first year, the team finished 15–13, in their last season as an Independent before joining the American South Conference to begin the 1987–88 season. After two seasons of teetering on .500 (14–14, 4–7 in conference) and above .500 (15–13, 4–6 in conference), the Broncs finished 21–9 in the 1989-90 season, with a 7–3 conference record, the most wins since 1977. In the 1990 American South Conference men's basketball tournament, the Broncs reached the championship game but lost to New Orleans 48-44. It was the first (and so far only) tournament championship game appearance in program history.

However, the next two seasons ended with losing seasons of 7–21 and 4–25 (with two conference wins in total), and Wall was fired. The American South Conference merged with the Sun Belt Conference after 1991, and the Broncs stayed within the conference.

The Wall era saw another change in the school name; during the 1989 offseason, Pan American joined the University of Texas System and became the University of Texas–Pan American.

=== Mark Adams era (1992–1997) ===
The team's woes continued in the first season under Adams, finishing with a 2–20 record (with a 2–16 conference record), their worst season since 1954. However, they improved to 16–12 (along with a 9–9 conference record) the following year. After a 14–14 season in 1994, they dropped to 9–19 the next year, but dropped even further in 1996, falling to 3–25, with only one conference win. In March 1996, the university acknowledged violations by the men's basketball program, specifically the conduct of illegal off-campus camps for basketball, free medical treatment for players and disregarding instructions by both the school and the NCAA on procedures of investigation. Adams was fired after the season ended.

=== Delray Brooks years (1997–1999) ===
Delray Brooks coached the team to a 3–24 record in their final season with the Sun Belt Conference in 1997, and led the team to a 5–22 season as an independent program the following year. On August 23, 1999, Brooks was fired. Notably, less than two months later Brooks was indicted by a grand jury on a felony theft charge for an allegation regarding depositing a $25,000 check from Southwest Missouri State into his personal account and subsequently making withdrawals from the account. He denied making the deposit or instructing a third party to do so, although he consents that the alleged $25,000 was added to his account. Less than a year later, he pleaded no contest and received 10 years of probation.

=== Bob Hoffman era (1999–2004) ===
After two seasons of 12 victories each, he led the team to a 20–10 finish in 2001, their first season over .500 since 1993. They plummeted to 10–20 the following year, and he finished his tenure with a 14–14 finish.

=== Robert Davenport years (2004–2006) ===
Davenport led the team to a 12–16 record for the first time since 1999 in his first season. A 7–24 record in his second season proved to be his last season with the Broncs.

=== Tom Schuberth years (2006–2009) ===
Tom Schuberth led the team to a 15–15 record in his first season, their first .500 team in three years. They improved to 18–13 the following year, the most victories since 2001. However, they finished 10–17 in 2008, and Schuberth's contract was not renewed after the season. Subsequently, it was found out that during his tenure, over 44 impermissible calls were made to 13 student-athletes from 2006 to 2008, along with paying inducements to one student-athlete, who also supervised workouts with an UTPA coach. It was found that the university had started their investigation in September 2008, which led to giving themselves a two-year probation sanction (starting in 2010), with the NCAA accepting UTPA's self-imposed penalties and choosing not to impose additional sanctions.

=== Ryan Marks era (2009–2013) ===
With the advent of a new coach came an acceptance into the Great West Conference, the first time the Broncs had been affiliated with a conference since 1997. Marks' two first seasons ended with 6 victories each before a slight improvement to 11–21 in 2011. Despite the team rising to a 16–16 overall record (and 5 victories in 8 conference games) the following year, his contract was not renewed.

=== Dan Hipsher era (2013–2016) ===
Alabama assistant coach Dan Hipsher, who previously served as head coach at Akron, Stetson, and Division III Wittenburg, was hired in 2013. The Broncs joined the Western Athletic Conference prior to the 2013 season. That year, they finished 9–23, with a 5–11 conference record. In their final season under the Bronc identity, the team finished 10–21 overall, with a 4–10 conference record, though they did win their final home game as the Broncs vs UMKC, highlighted with a buzzer beater 2-point shot as time expired. The 2015–16 season was their first season as the UTRGV Vaqueros, and they finished the season 8–22, with a 4–10 conference record. The school removed Hipsher from his head coaching position on March 15, 2016.

=== Lew Hill era (2016–2021) ===
Oklahoma assistant coach Lew Hill was named the new head coach on March 31, 2016. In his first season at UTRGV, the team finished 10–22 overall, with a 2–12 conference record. In the 2017–18 season, the Vaqueros went 15–16 while winning going 6–8 in WAC play before losing in the Quarterfinals to Seattle. This was the most wins by the team since the 2012–13 season in which they won 16 games. The Vaqueros were invited to the 2018 College Basketball Invitational, their first postseason berth since 1980, where they lost to New Orleans in the first round.

The following season, the Vaqueros improved. They went 19–16 in the regular season while going 9–7 in WAC play. This is the first winning season for the team since the 2007–08 team along with the first time they achieved a winning conference record since 1994–95. The Vaqueros were invited to the 2019 CollegeInsider.com Postseason Tournament. This is the program's first CIT appearance along with their second consecutive season with a postseason bid, the first for the program since the 1963 & 1964 seasons. They were designated to host the first-round game vs Grambling on March 20, the first time UTRGV has hosted a postseason tournament game since hosting a game in the NAIA District Playoffs in 1965 and the first at the UTRGV Fieldhouse. Facing off against, the Vaqueros narrowly won 74–73, winning on a pair of free throws with nine seconds remaining. It is their first postseason victory since 1968. They will move on to play Texas Southern on March 25, once again hosting.

Hill died at age 56 on February 7, 2021, late in his fifth season as coach.

=== Matt Figger era (2021–2024) ===
On March 29, 2021, Matt Figger was named the new head coach of the Vaqueros.

After a 29–65 record in three seasons, Figgar was fired on March 19, 2024. Less than a week after Figgar's firing, UTRGV announced on March 25 it would leave the WAC for the Southland Conference effective that July.

=== Kahil Fennell era (2024–present) ===
UTRGV announced on April 5, 2024, that Kahil Fennell, previously an assistant at BYU, would become the Vaqueros' new head coach and lead the team into its new conference.

== All-time statistical leaders ==
=== Career leaders ===
Category	Total	Player	Career
Points	1,880	Otto Moore	1964–68
Assists	771	Jesus Guerra	1972–76
Rebounds	1,679	Otto Moore	1964–68
Steals	231	Lalos Rios	1995–99
Blocks	216	Pete Perry	1971–73

=== Single-season leaders ===
- Points scored: 919 (Marshall Rogers – 1975–76)
- Assists: 323 (John Wilbanks – 1977–78)
- Rebounds: 626 (Lucious Jackson – 1962–63)
- Steals: 105 (Mire Chatman – 2001–02)
- Blocks: 120 (Pete Perry – 1972–73)

=== Single-game leaders ===
- Points scored: 58 (Marshall Rogers vs Texas Lutheran – 1976)
- Assists: 22 (John Wilbanks vs Arkansas State – 1977)
- Rebounds: 35 (Otto Moore vs Lamar Tech – 1966)
- Steals: 10 (John Wilbanks vs Texas A&I – 1977)
- Blocks: 11 (Pete Perry vs Lamar – 1972)

== All-time season results ==
Results accurate as of the end of the 2024–25 season.

Record table
Season	Coach	Overall	Conference	Standing	Postseason
L.A. Youngman (Independent) (1952–1953)
1952–53	L.A. Youngman	11–10			
L.A. Youngman (Big State Conference) (1953–1954)
1953–54	L.A. Youngman	6–11	0–6		
Harry Meng (Big State Conference) (1954–1956)
1954–55	Harry Meng	2–20	0–8		
1955–56	Harry Meng	4–20	0–10		
John Donnelly (Big State Conference) (1956–1958)
1956–57	John Donnelly	4–16	0–10		
1957–58	John Donnelly	5–14	1–10		
Sam Williams (Big State Conference) (1958–1962)
1958–59	Sam Williams	12–11	3–5		
1959–60	Sam Williams	17–9	7–3		
1960–61	Sam Williams	15–16	5–3		
1961–62	Sam Williams	26–4	9–1		NAIA second round
Sam Williams (Independent (NAIA / Division II)) (1962–1968)
1962–63	Sam Williams	25–6			NAIA champions
1963–64	Sam Williams	28–6			NAIA Runner-up
1964–65	Sam Williams	19–7			
1965–66	Sam Williams	15–12			
1966–67	Sam Williams	15–9			
1967–68	Sam Williams	21–6			NCAA College Division second round
Sam Williams (Independent (Division I)) (1968–1973)
1968–69	Sam Williams	9–16			
1969–70	Sam Williams	8–16			
1970–71	Sam Williams	13–13			
1971–72	Sam Williams	17–7			
1972–73	Sam Williams	4–22			
Abe Lemons (Independent (Division I)) (1973–1976)
1973–74	Abe Lemons	13–9			
1974–75	Abe Lemons	22–2			
1975–76	Abe Lemons	20–5			
Bill White (Independent (Division I)) (1976–1979)
1976–77	Bill White	16–10			
1977–78	Bill White	22–4			
1978–79	Bill White	13–13			
Bill White (Trans America Athletic Conference) (1979–1980)
1979–80	Bill White	20–8	4–2		
Bill White (Independent) (1980–1982)
1980–81	Bill White	18–11			NIT First Round
1981–82	Bill White	5–20			
Lon Kruger (Independent) (1982–1986)
1982–83	Lon Kruger	7–21			
1983–84	Lon Kruger	13–14			
1984–85	Lon Kruger	12–16			
1985–86	Lon Kruger	20–8			
Kevin Wall (Independent) (1986–1987)
1986–87	Kevin Wall	15–13			
Kevin Wall (American South Conference) (1987–1991)
1987–88	Kevin Wall	14–14	4–7	T-3rd	
1988–89	Kevin Wall	15–13	4–6	T-3rd	
1989–90	Kevin Wall	21–9	7–3	2nd	
1990–91	Kevin Wall	7–21	1–4	T-5th	
Kevin Wall (Sun Belt Conference) (1991–1992)
1991–92	Kevin Wall	4–25	1–15	11th	
Mark Adams (Sun Belt Conference) (1992–1997)
1992–93	Mark Adams	2–20	2–16	10th	
1993–94	Mark Adams	16–12	9–9	T-6th	
1994–95	Mark Adams	14–14	10–8	4th	
1995–96	Mark Adams	9–19	6–12	10th	
1996–97	Mark Adams	3–25	1–17	10th	
Delray Brooks (Sun Belt Conference) (1997–1998)
1997–98	Delray Brooks	3–24	3–15	10th	
Delray Brooks (Independent) (1998–1999)
1998–99	Delray Brooks	5–22			
Bob Hoffman (Independent) (1999–2004)
1999–00	Bob Hoffman	12–16			
2000–01	Bob Hoffman	12–17			
2001–02	Bob Hoffman	20–10			
2002–03	Bob Hoffman	10–20			
2003–04	Bob Hoffman	14–14			
Robert Davenport (Independent) (2004–2006)
2004–05	Robert Davenport	12–16			
2005–06	Robert Davenport	7–24			
Tom Schuberth (Independent) (2006–2009)
2006–07	Tom Schuberth	15-15			
2007–08	Tom Schuberth	18-13			
2008–09	Tom Schuberth	10-17			
Ryan Marks (Great West Conference) (2009–2013)
2009–10	Ryan Marks	6–27	4–8	7th	
2010–11	Ryan Marks	6–25	2–10	6th	
2011–12	Ryan Marks	11–21	5–5	4th	
2012–13	Ryan Marks	16–16	5–3	2nd	
Dan Hipsher (Western Athletic Conference) (2013–2016)
2013–14	Dan Hipsher	9–23	5–11	7th	
2014–15	Dan Hipsher	10–21	4–10	T–7th	
2015–16	Dan Hipsher	8–22	4–10	T–6th	
Lew Hill (WAC) (2016–2021)
2016–17	Lew Hill	10–22	2–12	7th	
2017–18	Lew Hill	15–18	6–8	5th	CBI first round
2018–19	Lew Hill	20–17	9–7	4th	CIT second round
2019–20	Lew Hill	14–16	9–7	3rd	
2020–21	Lew Hill / Jai Steadman (Note: Hill died on February 7, 2021, 12 games into the season. Steadman served as interim coach for the remaining seven games. Several games of the season were not played due to various COVID-related reasons within the conference, which saw Chicago State not even finish the season due to a lack of players prior to WAC play.)	9–10	2–5	8th	
Matt Figger (WAC) (2021–2024)
2021–22	Matt Figger	8–23	3–15	T–11th	
2022–23	Matt Figger	15–17	6–12	T–10th	
2023–24	Matt Figger	6–25	2–18	11th	
Kahil Fennell (Southland Conference) (2024–2026)
2024–25	Kahil Fennell	16–15	8–12	9th	
2025–26	Kahil Fennell	19–14	14–8	3rd	
Brandon Chambers (SLC) (2026–present)
2026–27	Brandon Chambers	0–0	0–0		
Total:		–	–		
National champion Postseason invitational champion Conference regular season champion Conference regular season and conference tournament champion Division regular season champion Division regular season and conference tournament champion Conference tournament champion

== Coaching history ==
Stats updated as of the end of the 2023–24 season.

Coach	Career	Record	Conference Record
L.A. Youngman	1952–1954	17–21	0–6
Harry Meng	1954–1956	6–40	0–18
John Donnelly	1956–1958	9–30	1–20
Sam Williams	1958–1973	244–160	24–12
Abe Lemons	1973–1976	55–16	0–0
Bill White	1976–1982	95–85	4–2
Lon Kruger	1982–1986	52–59	0–0
Kevin Wall	1986–1992	76–95	17–35
Mark Adams	1992–1998	44–90	28–62
Delray Brooks	1998–1999	8–46	3–15
Bob Hoffman	1999–2004	68–77	0–0
Robert Davenport	2004–2006	19–40	0–0
Tom Schuberth	2006–2009	42–45	0–0
Ryan Marks	2009–2012	39–89	16–26
Dan Hipsher	2013–2016	27–66	13–31
Lew Hill	2016–2021	67–77	28–34
Jai Steadman (interim)	2021	1–6	0–6
Matt Figger	2021–2024	29–65	11–45
Kahil Fennell	2024–2026	35–29	22–20
Brandon Chambers	2026–present	0–0	0–0
Totals		915–1,122	153–324

== Conference history ==
Conference	Years
Independent	1952–1953, 1962–1979, 1980–1987, 1998–2009
Big State Conference	1953–1962
Trans America Athletic Conference	1979–1980
American South Conference	1987–1991
Sun Belt Conference	1991–1998
Great West Conference	2009–2013
Western Athletic Conference	2013–2024
Southland Conference	2024–present

== Postseason ==
=== NIT results ===
The Vaqueros have appeared in one National Invitation Tournament (NIT) as the Pan American Broncs, losing their only game.

Year	Round	Opponent	Result
1981	First round	Tulsa	L 71–81

=== CBI results ===
UTRGV has appeared in one College Basketball Invitational (CBI). They have a record of 0–1.

Year	Round	Opponent	Result
2018	First round	New Orleans	L 74–77

=== CIT results ===
UTRGV has appeared in one CollegeInsider.com Postseason Tournament (CIT). Their record is 1–1.

Year	Round	Opponent	Result
2019	First round Second Round	Grambling State; Texas Southern	W 74–73; L 85–94

=== NCAA Division II ===
During their time as Pan American, they appeared in the NCAA Division II men's basketball tournament (then known as the NCAA College Division basketball tournament) once. The Broncs (now known as the Vaqueros) went 1–1.

Year	Round	Opponent	Result
1968	Regional semifinals Regional Final	Jackson State; Trinity	W 96–73; L 83–87^{OT}

=== NAIA results ===
During their time as Pan American, they appeared in the NAIA Men's Basketball Championships three times, going a combined record of 10–2, including an NAIA title.

Year	Round	Opponent	Result
1962	First round Second Round	Belmont Abbey; Ferris Institute	W 61–58; L 60–66
1963	First round Second Round; Elite Eight; NAIA National semifinals NAIA National Championship	Peru State; Stetson; Northern Michigan; Grambling State; Western Carolina	W 83–48; W 64–41; W 99–73; W 90–83; W 73–62
1964	First round Second Round; Elite Eight; NAIA National semifinals NAIA National Championship	La Crosse State (Wis.); St. Cloud State; Mansfield State; Carson–Newman; Rockhurst	W 94–82; W 81–76; W 82–69; W 56–54; L 66–56

== Retired numbers ==
UTRGV has retired three jersey numbers. On February 16, 2019, the Vaqueros retired Fred Taylor's 30 jersey.

Texas–Rio Grande Valley Vaqueros retired numbers
No.	Player	Position	Career
30	Fred Taylor	G / SF	1967–70
34	Otto Moore	C	1964–67
54	Lucious Jackson	PF	1961–64

== Notable players ==
The Vaqueros have had 18 of their players selected in the NBA draft, with six of them playing in the National Basketball Association (NBA).

Year	Round	Overall	Player	Team
1962	7	59	Howie Montgomery	San Francisco Warriors
1964	1	4	Lucious Jackson	Philadelphia 76ers
1965	6	52	Mitchell Edwards	Philadelphia 76ers
1966	14	105	Jim Harter	Baltimore Bullets
1967	12	124	Anthony Eatmon	Baltimore Bullets
1968	1	6	Otto Moore	Detroit Pistons
1970	2	27	Fred Taylor	Phoenix Suns
1971	10	158	Calvin Oliver	Houston Rockets
1973	2	34	Pete Perry	Los Angeles Lakers
1973	15	196	Reese Stovall	Cleveland Cavaliers
1974	3	46	Bruce King	New Orleans Jazz
1976	2	34	Marshall Rogers	Golden State Warriors
1978	5	106	Michael Edwards	Denver Nuggets
1978	8	168	Henry Taylor	San Antonio Spurs
1979	2	28	Danny Salisbury	Golden State Warriors
1980	8	172	Bill Bailey	San Antonio Spurs
1981	2	34	Ken Green	Denver Nuggets
1986	7	148	Michael Anderson	San Antonio Spurs
