= UTRGV Stadium (disambiguation) =

UTRGV Stadium may also refer to:

- UTRGV Stadium, football stadium in Texas
- UTRGV Fieldhouse
- UTRGV Baseball Stadium
- UTRGV Soccer and Track & Field Complex
- Orville Cox Tennis Center
