= Ryan Marks =

American basketball coach

Current position
- Title: Head coach (basketball)
- Team: St. Francis (IL)
- Conference: CCAC
- Record: 94–61

Biographical details
- Born: Chicago, Illinois, U.S.

Coaching career (HC unless noted)

Basketball
- 1990–1993: Los Angeles Clippers (personnel assistant)
- 1991–1993: Muir HS (assistant)
- 1993–1995: Central Missouri (assistant)
- 1995–2001: Northern Illinois (assistant)
- 2001–2004: Southern Vermont
- 2004–2009: St. Edward's
- 2009–2013: Texas–Pan American
- 2013–present: St. Francis (IL)

Baseball
- 2002–2004: Southern Vermont

Head coaching record
- Overall: 281–233 (basketball); 3–63 (baseball)
- Tournaments: Basketball; 0–3 (NCAA Division II); 1–1 (NCAA Division III); 0–2 (NAIA Division II)

Accomplishments and honors

Championships
- Basketball; GNAC regular season (2003); GNAC Tournament (2003); 3 Heartland regular season (2006–2008); 2 Heartland tournament (2006, 2007); 3 CCAC South Division (2015–2017)

Awards
- Basketball; 3× Heartland Coach of the Year (2006–2008); CCAC Coach of the Year (2015)

Ryan Marks is an American basketball coach. He is the head men's basketball coach at the University of St. Francis in Joliet, Illinois, a position he had held since 2013. Mark served in the same capacity at Southern Vermont College from 2002 to 2004, St. Edward's University in Austin, Texas from 2004 o 2009, and University of Texas–Pan American from 2009 to 2013. He was named Chicagoland Collegiate Athletic Conference Coach of the Year in and was given the Jack Bennett Award in 2015.

== Early life ==
A native of Chicago, Illinois, Mark played baseball in high school at the Latin School of Chicago, graduating in 1989. He graduated from the University of Southern California in 1993 with a bachelor's degree in public relations.

== Coaching career ==
Marks began his coaching career while attending the University of Southern California (USC), working as a player personnel assistant for the Los Angeles Clippers for three seasons, while also assisting at nearby Muir High School for two seasons. After graduating with a degree in journalism with an emphasis in public relations, Marks landed his first college coaching gig at the University of Central Missouri, helping guide the Mules to two NCAA Division II tournament bids, including an appearance in the Elite Eight in 1995. In 1996, Marks moved to Northern Illinois as an assistant, where he was on staff for six seasons, including the Huskies' trip to the 1996 NCAA Division I men's basketball tournament, where as a 14-seed, the Huskies narrowly lost, 73–72, to third-seeded Texas Tech.

Marks landed his first head coaching job at Southern Vermont College in Bennington, Vermont in 2001. In his three years at the helm of the Mountaineers, Marks compiled a 57–29 record, and in his first season turned around a three-win team in to a 15-win team. The following year, in 2002–03, the Mountaineers set a school record 24–6 mark, and earned its first NCAA Division III tournament bid. He also was the coach of the Southern Vermont baseball team.

In 2004, Marks accepted the head coaching job at St. Edward's University in Austin, Texas. His success carried over as he led the Hilltoppers to a 90–52 record in five seasons, including three NCAA Division II Tournament appearances, something St. Edward's had never accomplished before. In his final season at St. Edward's, Marks recorded his fourth consecutive winning season, a feat that had not been accomplished since the 1959 through 1962 campaigns.

In 2009, Marks was named the head coach of University of Texas–Pan American, where in three seasons, he has led the Broncs to a 23–73 record as the team transitioned to the Great West Conference. After leading the team to a 16−16 record in 2012–13, Marks' contract was not renewed.

On June 26, 2013, Marks was named the head coach at the University of St. Francis, an NAIA school in Joliet, Illinois. He was named Chicagoland Collegiate Athletic Conference Coach of the Year in 2015. Marks was also give the Jack Bennett Award in 2015.

== Head coaching record ==
=== Basketball ===
Record table
Season	Team	Overall	Conference	Standing	Postseason
Southern Vermont Mountaineers (Great Northeast Athletic Conference) (2001–2004)
2001–02	Southern Vermont	15–12	7–6	5th	
2002–03	Southern Vermont	24–6	16–2	1st	NCAA Division III second round
2003–04	Southern Vermont	18–11	14–4	2nd	
Southern Vermont:		57–29	37–12		
St. Edward's Hilltoppers (Heartland Conference) (2004–2009)
2004–05	St. Edward's	6–21	1–11	7th	
2005–06	St. Edward's	21–9	9–3	T–1st	NCAA Division II first round
2006–07	St. Edward's	24–6	10–2	1st	NCAA Division II first round
2007–08	St. Edward's	23–7	9–1	1st	NCAA Division II first round
2008–09	St. Edward's	17–11	11–5	4th	
St. Edward's:		91–54	40–22		
Texas–Pan American Broncs (Great West Conference) (2009–2013)
2009–10	Texas–Pan American	6–27	4–8	7th	
2010–11	Texas–Pan American	6–25	2–10	6th	
2011–12	Texas–Pan American	11–21	5–5	4th	
2012–13	Texas–Pan American	16–16	5–3	2nd	
Texas–Pan American:		39–89	16–26		
St. Francis Fighting Saints (Chicagoland Collegiate Athletic Conference) (2013–present)
2013–14	St. Francis	15–15	12–7	3rd (South)	
2014–15	St. Francis	23–10	16–3	T–1st (South)	NAIA Division II first round
2015–16	St. Francis	28–4	19–2	1st (South)	NAIA Division II first round
2016–17	St. Francis	18–13	12–9	T–1st (South)	
2017–18	St. Francis	10–19	7–13	11th	
2018–19	St. Francis	20-15	10-10		NAIA Division II second round
2019–20	St. Francis	10-18	8-12		
2020-21	St. Francis	14-10			
2021–22	St. Francis	14-14	10-12	8th	
2022–23	St. Francis	16-11	14-6	5th	'
2023–2	St. Francis	10-16	9-11	8th	
2023–2	St. Francis	10-16	9-11	8th	
St. Francis:		168-129	80–45		
Total:		327-277			
National champion Postseason invitational champion Conference regular season champion Conference regular season and conference tournament champion Division regular season champion Division regular season and conference tournament champion Conference tournament champion
