= Tom Schuberth =

American basketball player and coach

Current position
- Title: Head coach
- Team: Paris Junior College

Biographical details
- Born: December 21, 1957 (age 68); Chicago, Illinois, U.S.

Playing career
- 1976–1977: UNLV
- 1977–1980: Mississippi State

Coaching career (HC unless noted)
- 1982–1983: North Alabama (asst.)
- 1983–1992: Louisiana–Monroe (asst.)
- 1992–1997: Memphis (asst.)
- 1997–2001: SE Missouri State (asst.)
- 2001–2002: UAB (asst.)
- 2002–2006: Central Florida (asst.)
- 2006–2009: Texas–Pan American

Tom Schuberth (born December 21, 1957) is a former head men's basketball coach at the University of Texas-Pan American.

== Head coaching record ==
Record table
Season	Team	Overall	Conference	Standing
Texas-Pan American (Independent) (2006–present)
2006–07	Texas-Pan American	14-15		
2007–08	Texas-Pan American	18-13		
2008–09	Texas-Pan American	10-17		
Texas-Pan American:		42-45		
Total:		42-45		
National champion Postseason invitational champion Conference regular season champion Conference regular season and conference tournament champion Division regular season champion Division regular season and conference tournament champion Conference tournament champion
