= 1962 NAIA basketball tournament =

College basketball tournament

1962 NAIA men's basketball tournament
- Season: 1961–62
- Teams: 32
- Finals site: Municipal Auditorium; Kansas City, Missouri
- Champions: Prairie View A&M (Texas) (1st title, 1st title game, 1st Final Four)
- Runner-up: Westminster (Pa.) (2nd title game, 3rd Final Four)
- Semifinalists: Southeastern Oklahoma (3rd Final Four); Western Illinois (4th Final Four)
- Coach of the year: Buzz Ridl (Westminster (Pa.))
- Charles Stevenson Hustle Award: Bill Douds (Westminster (Pa.))
- MVP: Zelmo Beaty (Prairie View A&M (Texas))

The 1962 NAIA men's basketball tournament was held in March at Municipal Auditorium in Kansas City, Missouri. The 25th annual NAIA basketball tournament featured 32 teams playing in a single-elimination format. It would be the last tournament without a formal leading scorer and rebounder awards presented. This was also the first tournament since seeding began to feature the top two teams in the Championship Game. The number 2 seeded Prairie View A&M (Texas) beat Westminster (Pa.) 62 to 53.

== Awards and honors ==
Many of the records set by the 1962 tournament have been broken, and many of the awards were established much later:

- Leading scorer: est. 1963
- Leading rebounder: est. 1963
- Player of the Year: est. 1994
- Most rebounds; tournament: 96, Zelmo Beaty, Prairie View A&M (Texas)
- Most rebounds; career start: 180, Lucious Jackson, Pan American (Texas), (1962, 1963, 1964)
- All-time leading scorer; first appearance: Lucious Jackson 7th, Pan American (Texas) (1962,63,64), 12 games, 117 field goals, 67 free throws, 301 total points, 25.0 average per game.

== 1962 NAIA bracket ==
First round	Second round
1	Westminster (Pa.)	59
-	McMurry (Texas)	54
1	Westminster	82
16	William Jewell	65
-	Central Connecticut State	52
16	William Jewell (Mo.)	57
TOP TIER
9	Orange State (Calif.)	94
-	Stetson (Fla.)	79
9	Orange State	97
-	Lewis & Clark	78
-	Lewis & Clark (Ore.)	75
8	Fort Hays State (Kan.)	69
5	Pan American (Texas)	61
-	Belmont Abbey (N.C.)	58*
5	Pan American	60
12	Ferris Institute	66
-	St. Norbert (Wis.)	68
12	Ferris Institute (Mich.)	73
TOP TIER
13	Southeastern Oklahoma State	83
-	College of Idaho	64
13	Southeastern Oklahoma State	59
4	Winston-Salem State	50
-	Indiana State	71
4	Winston-Salem State (N.C.)	83
3	Georgetown (Ky.)	51
-	Carson-Newman (Tenn.)	75
-	Carson-Newman	67
14	Peru State	65
-	Mayville State (N.D.)	74
14	Peru State (Neb.)	90
BOTTOM TIER
-	Florence State (Ala.)	54
10	St. Cloud State (Minn.)	86
7	St. Cloud State	68
10	Western Illinois	84
7	Western Illinois	76
-	Pratt Institute (N.Y.)	70
-	Pacific Lutheran (Wash.)	75
6	Savannah State (Ga.)	84
6	Savannah State	91
-	Arizona State-Flagstaff	95
11	Buena Vista (Iowa)	73
-	Arizona State-Flagstaff	95
BOTTOM TIER
15	Morris Harvey (W.Va.)	95
-	Ouachita Baptist (Ark.)	70
15	Morris Harvey	70
2	Prairie View A&M	85
-	Ashland (Ohio)	64*
2	Prairie View A&M (Texas)	73

Elite Eight
1	Westminster	63
9	Orange State	55
12	Ferris Institute	49
13	Southeastern Oklahoma State	69
-	Carson-Newman	65
10	Western Illinois	91
-	Arizona State-Flagstaff	48
2	Prairie View A&M	86

NAIA national semifinals
1	Westminster	54
13	Southeastern Oklahoma State	45
10	Western Illinois	68
2	Prairie View A&M	80

NAIA national championship
1	Westminster	53
2	Prairie View A&M	62

- * denotes overtime.

=== Third-place game ===
The third-place game featured the losing teams from the national semifinalist to determine 3rd and 4th places in the tournament. This game was played until 1988.

NAIA third-place game
13	Southeastern Oklahoma State	76
10	Western Illinois	62

== See also ==
- 1962 NCAA University Division basketball tournament
- 1962 NCAA College Division basketball tournament
