= Celeste De Luna =

American printmaker (born 1974)

- Born: 1974 (age 51–52)
- Spouse(s): Ramon Benitez (m. 1995) Ivan Yanes (m. 2001)
- Children: 3

Academic background
- Education: St. Edward's University, 1998; University of Texas–Pan American, MA Studio Arts, 2009
- Thesis: The borderline between the personal and political (2009)

Academic work
- Discipline: Visual arts; Mexican American Studies
- Institutions: University of Texas Rio Grande Valley; Northwest Vista College
- Website: celestedeluna.com

Celeste De Luna (born 1974) is a Mexican American Chicana visual artist, printmaker, and educator.

De Luna previously taught art at the University of Texas Rio Grande Valley, and is currently an assistant professor of Mexican American Studies at Northwest Vista College.

== Early life and education ==
De Luna was born in 1974 in Aurora, Illinois, to Raymundo De Luna and Alicia De Luna. She is a second‑generation Mexican-American. When De Luna was eight years old, her family returned to South Texas.

In 1998, De Luna graduated from St. Edward's University and began teaching at a high school in the Lower Rio Grande Valley. She graduated with a Master's in Studio Arts from the University of Texas–Pan American in 2009. De Luna's thesis entitled "The borderline between the personal and political", was supervised by Jean Braithwaite, Philip Field, and Richard Phillips.

== Career ==
De Luna's work explores American identity through multiple lenses. Her upbringing in Texas influenced her work, which deals with themes such as life in the borderlands, identity, and migration. She has characterised her practice as regional, offering insights into the experiences of undocumented communities. De Luna considers her work “an act against forgetting my Tejana roots. It is a protest against complete assimilation.” Other influences on her work include the flora and fauna of the Lower Rio Grande Valley and Catholicism. Artistically, she admires symbolists such as Henri Rousseau and Paul Gauguin, as well as Frida Kahlo and Amalia Mesa-Bains.

Necrocitizen is a black and white woodcut print featured on the cover of the book Fencing in Democracy, by Miguel Diaz-Barriga and Margaret Dorsey. The image in this print features a skull, representing De Luna's exploration of oppressive structures imposed on brown bodies and their treatment as second-class citizens.

De Luna created 'Border Land X Scapes', an art workshop focused on decolonizing the border through a futuristic perspective, emphasising the experiences and histories of indigenous populations.

De Luna is the co-founder of Las Imaginistas, an art collective that contributes to various projects aimed at fostering community dialogue and social awareness. Las Imaginistas collaborates with professors from the University of Texas Rio Grande Valley to examine the mind and body of Brownsville and challenge colonial ideologies through the city's architecture. Las Imaginistas received an Artplace America Creative Placemaking grant in 2017 and in 2018 an A Blade of Grass Fellows fellowship.

Our Lady of the Checkpoint is a black and white woodcut and vinyl piece on archival paper from 2020. The print features an immigrant version of the Virgin de Guadalupe walking into America barefoot with barbed wire around her.

Healing Borderland Hand is a linocut from 2023, which features many details, including the Virgin de Guadalupe, a skull, cacti, flowers, a bird, barbed wire, and a bug. These elements are considered to reflect her Catholic roots and upbringing in Texas.

De Luna's work has been included at the Blanton Museum of Art, Mexic-Arte Museum, Mulvane Art Museum, and the UTSA Print Collections. It has been shown at exhibitions in Vancouver, Michoacan, and Estonia.

She has won artist awards throughout the United States for her work and has had multiple residencies include the Changarrito Residency at the Mexic-Arte Museum and a Merit Award at the 10th annual Human Rights Art Exhibition for South Texas College in McAllen, Texas.

== Personal life ==
De Luna married Ramon Benitez in 1995, and married Ivan Yanes in 2001. She has three children.

As of 2025, De Luna lives in San Antonio and works from her home studio, Metzli Press.
