= Brandon Chambers =

American basketball coach

Current position
- Title: Head coach
- Team: UT Rio Grande Valley
- Conference: Southland Conference

Biographical details
- Education: Virginia Commonwealth University; Misericordia University

Coaching career (HC unless noted)
- 2011–2013: Misericordia (assistant)
- 2013–2015: Marymount (assistant)
- 2015–2016: Paul VI Catholic HS (assistant)
- 2019–2021: Texas Southern (assistant)
- 2021–2022: LSU (assistant)
- 2022–2023: Texas Southern (assistant)
- 2023–2025: McNeese (assistant)
- 2025–2026: NC State (assistant)
- 2026–present: UT Rio Grande Valley

Administrative career (AD unless noted)
- 2009–2011: VCU (SM)
- 2016–2019: Nevada (DBO)

Brandon Chambers is an American basketball coach. He is currently the head coach of the UT Rio Grande Valley Vaqueros men's basketball team. He previously worked for the VCU Rams, Misericordia Cougars, Marymount Saints, at Paul VI Catholic High School, for the Nevada Wolf Pack, Texas Southern Tigers, LSU Tigers, McNeese Cowboys and NC State Wolfpack.

== Early life ==
Chambers's father, Jay, served as a colonel in the United States Army. Jay died from ALS in 2010. Chambers attended Virginia Commonwealth University (VCU) where he was a student manager for the VCU Rams men's basketball team, being a member of the 2009–10 team that won the College Basketball Invitational and the 2010–11 team that reached the Final Four of the NCAA Tournament. He received a bachelor's degree in business administration from VCU in 2011. He later graduated from Misericordia University in 2013 with a master's degree.

== Coaching career ==
After Chambers's graduation from VCU, he worked as an assistant coach for the Misericordia Cougars from 2011 to 2013. He spent the following two years as an assistant coach for the Marymount Saints before spending one year as an assistant coach at Paul VI Catholic High School. Chambers was also active as a coach at basketball camps. In 2016, he was hired by the Nevada Wolf Pack, and he served three years as their director of basketball operations.

Chambers joined the Texas Southern Tigers as an assistant in 2019, serving until 2021 in that role. He worked as an assistant for the LSU Tigers from 2021 to 2022 before returning to Texas Southern. Chambers was hired by the McNeese Cowboys as an assistant in 2023, joining head coach Will Wade whom he had worked under at VCU and LSU. He served as interim head coach for a few games during the 2023–24 season while Wade was suspended, defeating VCU in his first game. In 2025, he followed Wade and was hired by the NC State Wolfpack as an assistant coach. He served one season there and acted as their defensive coordinator. For a period of nine seasons across his stints at Nevada, Texas Southern, LSU, McNeese and NC State, Chambers made the NCAA Tournament every year.

In April 2026, Chambers was named the new head coach of the UT Rio Grande Valley Vaqueros.

== Head coaching record ==
Record table
Season	Team	Overall	Conference	Standing	Postseason
UT Rio Grande Valley Vaqueros (Southland Conference) (2026–present)
2026–27	UT Rio Grande Valley	0–0	0–0		
UT Rio Grande Valley:		0–0 (–)	0–0 (–)		
Total:		0–0 (–)			
