= Grambling State Tigers men's basketball =

Collegiate basketball team

2026–27 Grambling State Tigers men's basketball team
- University: Grambling State University
- Head coach: Patrick Crarey II (2nd season)
- Location: Grambling, Louisiana
- Arena: Fredrick C. Hobdy Assembly Center (capacity: 7,500)
- Conference: SWAC
- Nickname: Tigers
- Colors: Black, gold, and red

NCAA Division I tournament Elite Eight
- 1958*
Other NCAA Division I tournament results
Sweet Sixteen	1958*, 1976*
Appearances	1958*, 1976*, 2024

Conference tournament champions
- 2024

Conference regular-season champions
- 1959, 1960, 1963, 1964, 1966, 1967, 1971, 1972, 1987, 1989, 2018, 2023, 2024

Uniforms
Home	Away
- * at Division II level

The Grambling State Tigers men's basketball team represents Grambling State University in Grambling, Louisiana. The school's team currently competes in the Southwestern Athletic Conference. They currently play their home games at the Fredrick C. Hobdy Assembly Center. They made their first ever appearance to the NCAA Division I men's basketball tournament in 2024.

== History ==
The glory years of the Tigers were led by Fred Hobdy, who led the Tigers to eight SWAC regular season titles (five outright) during his coaching tenure. Hobdy went 572-288 as head coach from 1957 to 1986, which saw them play in NCAA Division II and the NAIA. They reached the Elite Eight of the Division II tournament in 1958 and won the NAIA title in 1961. Notable players during this time were Willis Reed, who was an NAIA All-American before becoming drafted by the New York Knicks; Reed was inducted into the Naismith Memorial Basketball Hall of Fame in 1982.

The Tigers advanced to the 1980 SWAC men's basketball tournament against Alcorn State (the regular season champion) for a chance to reach the NCAA Division I Tournament but lost 83–61. In 1986, Hobdy retired, later serving as athletic director for the program from 1989 to 1996 prior to his death in 1998 (years later, Grambling's new Assembly Center would be named after him). The 1986-87 team won the regular season championship but were walloped 105-55 by Southern in the SWAC Final. They returned to the Final the following year and lost again to Southern 78–62. Grambling won a share of the regular season title for the 1988-89 season with Southern and Texas Southern after each had 10-4 records, but Grambling lost in the Semifinals to Texas Southern, who then lost to Southern. The Tigers, with a record of 8–10 in SWAC play and seeded 6th, pulled off two shocking upsets (of three-seeded Mississippi Valley State and two-seeded Jackson State) to advance to the final round of the SWAC men's basketball tournament for the fourth time in program history in 2011 but lost to fourth-seeded Alabama State.

The 2012–13 team became the eighth NCAA Division I team to finish a season winless. The 2022–23 Tigers team returned to the SWAC Tournament title game for the fifth time in school history only to lose against Texas Southern, 58–61, for the right to advance to the NCAA Tournament.

On March 16, 2024, Grambling won the 2024 SWAC tournament after winning the regular season title, defeating the three-time defending champion Texas Southern, earning its first NCAA tournament bid in program history. The Tigers beat Montana State in the First Four, 88–81 in overtime, giving them their first win in the tournament.

== Postseason results ==
=== NCAA Division I Tournament results ===
The Tigers appeared in one NCAA Division I men's basketball tournament. Their combined record is 1–1.

Year	Seed	Round	Opponent	Result
2024	#16	First Four; First Round	#16 Montana State #1 Purdue	W 88–81^{OT} L 50–78

=== NIT results ===
The Tigers have appeared in one National Invitation Tournament (NIT). Their record is 0–1.

Year	Round	Opponent	Result
1980	First Round	Ole Miss	L 74–76

=== CollegeInsider.com Postseason Tournament (CIT) results ===
The Tigers have appeared in one CollegeInsider.com Postseason Tournament (CIT). Their record is 0–1.

Year	Round	Opponent	Result
2019	First round	UTRGV	L 73–74

=== NCAA Division II Tournament results ===
The Tigers have appeared in two NCAA Division II Tournaments. Their combined record is 3–2.

Year	Round	Opponent	Result
1958	Regional semifinals Regional Finals; Elite Eight	South Carolina State; North Carolina A&T; Saint Michael's	W 104–79; W 88–73; L 76–84
1976	Regional semifinals Regional Finals	Missouri S&T; Nicholls State	W 67–61; L 89–90

=== NAIA Tournament results ===
The Tigers have appeared in seven NAIA Tournaments. Their combined record is 15–6 and were NAIA national champions in 1961.

Year	Round	Opponent	Result
1959	First round Second Round	Christian Brothers; Lenoir-Rhyne	W 81–70; L 78–88
1960	First round Second Round; Quarterfinals	Central Connecticut; Thomas More; Texas State	W 92–68; W 113–97; L 68–76
1961	First round Second Round; Quarterfinals; Semifinals; National Championship Game	Linfield; Peru State; Anderson (IN); Westminster (PA); Georgetown (KY)	W 107–85; W 80–60; W 62–54; W 45–44; W 95–75
1963	First round Second Round; Quarterfinals; Semifinals; National 3rd-place game	Arkansas Tech; Athens State; Carson-Newman; Texas–Pan American; Fort Hays State	W 76–59; W 56–45; W 79–70; L 83–90; W 107–86
1964	First round Second Round	Quincy; Saint Mary's (TX)	W 75–72; L 66–72
1969	First round	UNC Asheville	L 74–86
1971	First round Second Round; Quarterfinals	Mansfield; Rowan; Kentucky State	W 88–78; W 77–75; L 81–93

== See also ==
- List of NCAA Division I men's basketball programs
