= Greg Guy =

American basketball player (born 1971)

Personal information
- Born: October 17, 1971 (age 55) Oak Park, Illinois
- Listed height: 6 ft 1 in (1.85 m)
- Listed weight: 190 lb (86 kg)

Career information
- High school: Oak Park and River Forest (Oak Park, Illinois)
- College: NE Oklahoma A&M (1989–1990); Lincoln (IL) (1990–1991); Fresno State (1991); Texas–Pan American (1992–1994)
- NBA draft: 1994: undrafted
- Position: Point guard / shooting guard

Career highlights
- NCAA scoring champion (1993); 2× All-Sun Belt (1993, 1994)

Gregory Guy Jr. (born October 17, 1971) is a retired American professional basketball player most known for being the NCAA scoring champion during the 1992–93 season.

He was born in Oak Park, Illinois, and his father Gregory Guy Sr. was a basketball player for Illinois State. Guy went to Oak Park and River Forest High School. He attended two different junior colleges and spent a semester at Fresno State University before transferring to the University of Texas–Pan American in December of his junior season in 1992–93. Guy, a 6 ft 1 in (1.85 m), 190 lb. point guard/shooting guard, led the Broncs in scoring in each of his seasons with the team. He also made an immediate impact as a transfer player by leading all of Division I in scoring with a 29.3 points per game average. Despite his explosive scoring ability, the Broncs finished the season with a 2–20 overall record. He, therefore, was on the worst team in college basketball history to have the nation's leading scorer on its roster. Texas–Pan American improved to 16–12 for Guy's senior season, and although he led the team in scoring, he did not repeat as the country's leading scorer.

After college, Guy played professional basketball abroad, including a stint on Lobos UAG in Mexico.

== See also ==
- List of NCAA Division I men's basketball season scoring leaders
