= 1964 NAIA basketball tournament =

College basketball tournament

1964 NAIA men's basketball tournament
- Season: 1963–64
- Teams: 32
- Finals site: Municipal Auditorium; Kansas City, Missouri
- Champions: Rockhurst Hawks (1st title, 1st title game, 1st Final Four)
- Runner-up: Pan American Broncs (2nd title game, 2nd Final Four)
- Semifinalists: Carson–Newman Eagles (1st Final Four); Emporia State Hornets (2nd Final Four)
- Coach of the year: Sam Williams (Pan American (Texas))
- Charles Stevenson Hustle Award: Ralph Telken (Rockhurst)
- MVP: Lucious Jackson (Pan American (Texas))
- Top scorer: Lucious Jackson (Pan American) (124 points)

The 1964 NAIA men's basketball tournament was held in March at Municipal Auditorium in Kansas City, Missouri. The 27th annual NAIA basketball tournament featured 32 teams playing in a single-elimination format. It was the first time the leading rebounder was also the leading scorer, Lucious Jackson of runner-up Pan American (Texas). Lucious was also named tournament Most Valuable Player, which made him the third player to receive the award back to back.

== Awards and honors ==
- Leading scorer: Lucious Jackson, Pan American; 5 games, 54 field goals, 16 free throws, 124 total points (24.8 points per game)
- Leading rebounder: Lucious Jackson, Pan American; 5 games, 67 rebounds (13.4 rebounds per game)
- Player of the Year: est. 1994
- Most rebounds; career ends: 180, Lucious Jackson, Pan American, (1962,63,64)
- All-time leading scorer; final appearance: Lucious Jackson, 7th Pan American (1962,63,64); 12 games, 117 field goals, 67 free throws, 301 total points, 25.0 average per game and Willis Reed, 16th Grambling (La.) (1961,63,64); 12 games 108 field goals 39 free throws 265 total points, 22.8 average per.

== 1964 NAIA bracket ==
First round
1 | Pan American | 94
- | Wisconsin State–La Crosse | 82
- | Jersey City State | 47
16 | St. Cloud State | 66
9 | Georgetown (KY) | 87
- | St. Joseph (NM) | 79
- | Miles | 79
8 | Mansfield State | 99
5 | Central State (OK) | 95
- | Cedarville | 40
- | Buena Vista | 94
12 | Pacific Lutheran | 109
13 | Hastings | 87
- | Huntingdon | 89
- | Lewis & Clark | 66
4 | Carson–Newman | 75
3 | Grambling | 75
- | Quincy | 72
- | St. Mary's (TX) | 64
14 | Central Connecticut | 62
7 | Indiana Central | 92
- | Morris Harvey | 81
- | Eastern Montana | 70
10 | Rockhurst | 77
11 | Kentucky State | 71
- | Redlands | 65
- | Ouachita Baptist | 68
6 | Emporia State | 93
15 | Georgia Southern | 86
- | Dakota Wesleyan | 72
- | Ferris State | 70
2 | High Point | 86

Second round
1 | Pan American | 81
16 | St. Cloud State | 76
9 | Georgetown (KY) | 89*
8 | Mansfield State | 97
5 | Central State (OK) | 84
12 | Pacific Lutheran | 72
- | Huntingdon | 59
4 | Carson–Newman | 76
3 | Grambling | 66
- | St. Mary's (TX) | 72
7 | Indiana Central | 74
10 | Rockhurst | 76
11 | Kentucky State | 80
6 | Emporia State | 85
15 | Georgia Southern | 76
2 | High Point | 85

Elite Eight
1 | Pan American | 82
8 | Mansfield State | 69
5 | Central State (OK) | 55
4 | Carson–Newman | 61
- | St. Mary's (TX) | 54
10 | Rockhurst | 59
6 | Emporia State | 90
2 | High Point | 78

NAIA national semifinals
1 | Pan American | 56
4 | Carson–Newman | 54
10 | Rockhurst | 66
6 | Emporia State | 61

NAIA national championship
1 | Pan American | 56
10 | Rockhurst | 66

- * denotes overtime.

=== Third-place game ===
The third-place game featured the losing teams from the national semifinalist to determine 3rd and 4th places in the tournament. This game was played until 1988.

| NAIA third-place game |
| 4 | Carson–Newman | 73 |
| 6 | Emporia State | 60 |

== See also ==
- 1964 NCAA University Division basketball tournament
- 1964 NCAA College Division basketball tournament
