= UTRGV Fieldhouse =

Sports arena on the campus of University of Texas Rio Grande Valley in Edinburg, TX

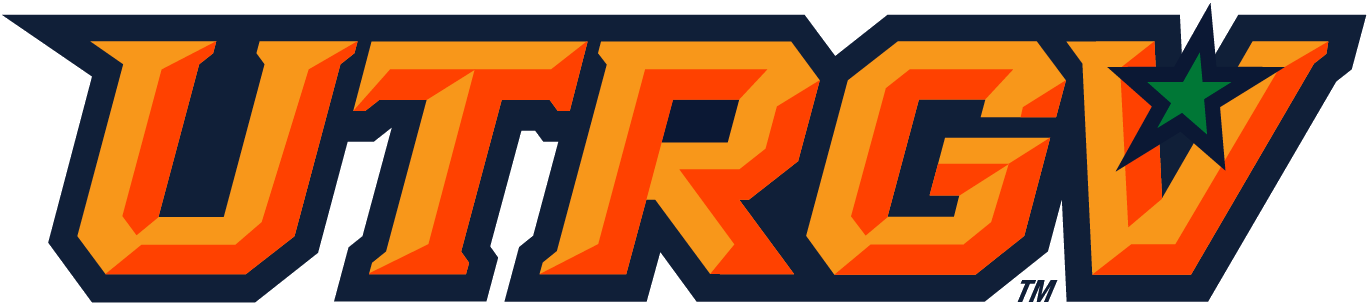

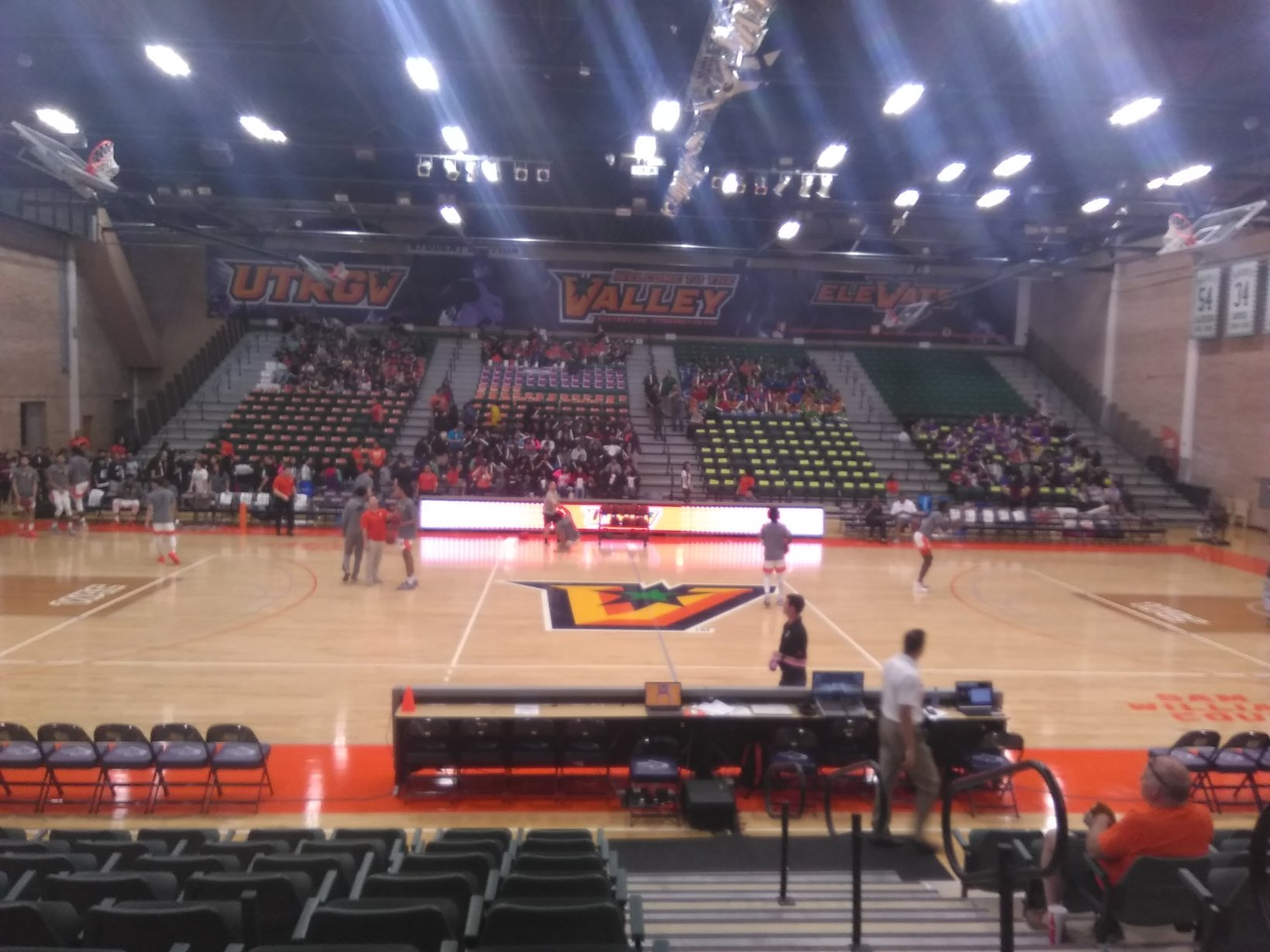
- UTRGV Fieldhouse in 2020
- Interactive map of UTRGV Fieldhouse
- Location: N 5th Ave, Edinburg, TX 78541
- Coordinates: 26°18′37″N 98°10′41″W
- Owner: University of Texas Rio Grande Valley
- Operator: University of Texas Rio Grande Valley
- Capacity: Current: 2,500; Pre-renovation: 4,000
- Surface: Multi-surface
- Record attendance: 5,649 (Jan. 24, 1981 vs Lamar Cardinals)

Construction
- Built: 1969
- Opened: 1969; 57 years ago
- Renovated: 2010, 2012–2013

Tenant
- UTRGV Vaqueros (NCAA) (2015–present)

Website
- goutrgv.com

UTRGV Fieldhouse (formerly UTPA Fieldhouse until the 2015 merger that created UTRGV) is a 2,500-seat multi-purpose arena on the campus of the University of Texas Rio Grande Valley in Edinburg, Texas. It was built in 1969 for one of UTRGV's predecessor institutions, Pan American University, which later became the University of Texas-Pan American (UTPA), and is home to the UTRGV Vaqueros men's and women's basketball teams, as well as the Vaqueros women's volleyball team. The Fieldhouse is also used extensively by the Department of Health and Kinesiology.

Located on the far east end of the campus, the UTRGV Fieldhouse is among the oldest Division I arenas in Texas. While capacity is officially listed at 2,500, a record crowd of 5,649 jammed the Fieldhouse in 1981 to see the Vaqueros' predecessors, Coach Bill White's Pan American University Broncos battle Pat Foster's Lamar Cardinals.

== Improvements ==
While maintaining a sense of history and tradition, the UTRGV Fieldhouse has undergone renovations. A new center court, new bleachers, and court-side seating were added in 2010. In 2012, a new electronic scoreboard was added. Volleyball offices, locker rooms, and team meeting rooms were renovated in 2012. Basketball offices, locker rooms, and team meeting rooms were renovated in 2013. New scoreboards and shot clocks were installed in 2014. The court was refinished in 2015. In 2017, a new sound system was installed. Several improvements were completed in 2019 including refinishing the court to a new color scheme, new sideline tables, new scoreboards, and renovated home and visitor's locker rooms. In 2024, the team finished a renovation on the atrium that included new box office, team store, concession stand, Hall of Fame area, and restrooms.

The venue's name changed in 2015, when UTRGV began operation following the merger of UTPA and the nearby University of Texas at Brownsville.

== See also ==
- List of NCAA Division I basketball arenas
