= Ken Green (basketball, born 1959) =

American basketball player

Personal information
- Born: September 19, 1959 Newnan, Georgia, U.S.
- Died: December 4, 2019
- Listed height: 6 ft 8 in (2.03 m)
- Listed weight: 215 lb (98 kg)

Career information
- High school: West Fulton (Atlanta, Georgia)
- College: Ranger College (1977–1979); Texas–Pan American (1979–1981)
- NBA draft: 1981: 2nd round, 34th overall pick
- Drafted by: Denver Nuggets
- Position: Power forward
- Number: 3

Career history
- 1981–1982: Rochester Zeniths
- 1984–1986: Sarasota / Florida Stingers
- 1986: Bay State Bombardiers
- 1986: New York Knicks
- 1987–1988: Savannah Spirits
- 1988–1989: Quad City Thunder
- 1989–1990: Cedar Rapids Silver Bullets

Career highlights
- All-CBA First Team (1986); CBA rebounding leader (1986)
- Stats at NBA.com
- Stats at Basketball Reference

Kenneth M. "Apple" Green (September 19, 1959 – December 4, 2019) was an American professional basketball player for the New York Knicks of the National Basketball Association (NBA). Green played for Pan American University, where he led the Broncs to the 1981 NIT tournament, the school's only Division I post-season appearance. During this season Green was an NCAA honorable mention All American. Green was drafted with the eleventh pick in the second round of the 1981 NBA draft by the Denver Nuggets; however, the Nuggets waived Green before the start of the 1981-82 NBA season. He was signed by the Portland Trail Blazers before the 1985–86 NBA season, but was once again waived before the start of the season. On March 25, 1986, the New York Knicks signed Green to a 10-day contract and then signed him to a contract for the rest of the season on April 4, 1986. In seven games with the Knicks, Green averaged 4.4 points per game and 3.9 rebounds per game.

Green played in the Continental Basketball Association (CBA) for the Rochester Zeniths, Sarasota / Florida Stingers, Bay State Bombardiers, Savannah Spirits, Quad City Thunder and Cedar Rapids Silver Bullets from 1981 to 1990. He was selected to the All-CBA First Team in 1986.

== Career statistics ==
Legend
| GP | Games played | GS | Games started | MPG | Minutes per game |
| FG% | Field goal percentage | 3P% | 3-point field goal percentage | FT% | Free throw percentage |
| RPG | Rebounds per game | APG | Assists per game | SPG | Steals per game |
| BPG | Blocks per game | PPG | Points per game | **Bold** | Career high |

=== NBA ===
==== Regular season ====
| Year | Team | GP | GS | MPG | FG% | 3P% | FT% | RPG | APG | SPG | BPG | PPG |
|---|---|---|---|---|---|---|---|---|---|---|---|---|
| 1985–86 | New York | 7 | 0 | 10.3 | .481 | – | .556 | 3.9 | .3 | .6 | .0 | 4.4 |
