= Stetson Hatters men's basketball =

College basketball team

2026–27 Stetson Hatters men's basketball team
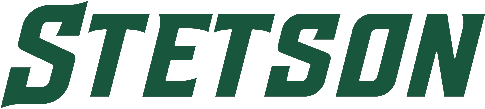
- University: Stetson University
- Head coach: Donnie Jones (8th season)
- Location: DeLand, Florida
- Arena: Edmunds Center (capacity: 5,000)
- Conference: Atlantic Sun Conference
- Nickname: Hatters
- Colors: Hunter green and white

NCAA Division I tournament Elite Eight
- 1970*
Other NCAA Division I tournament results
Sweet Sixteen	1970*
Appearances	1967*, 1970*, 1971*, 2024

Conference tournament champions
- ASUN: 2024
- * at Division II level

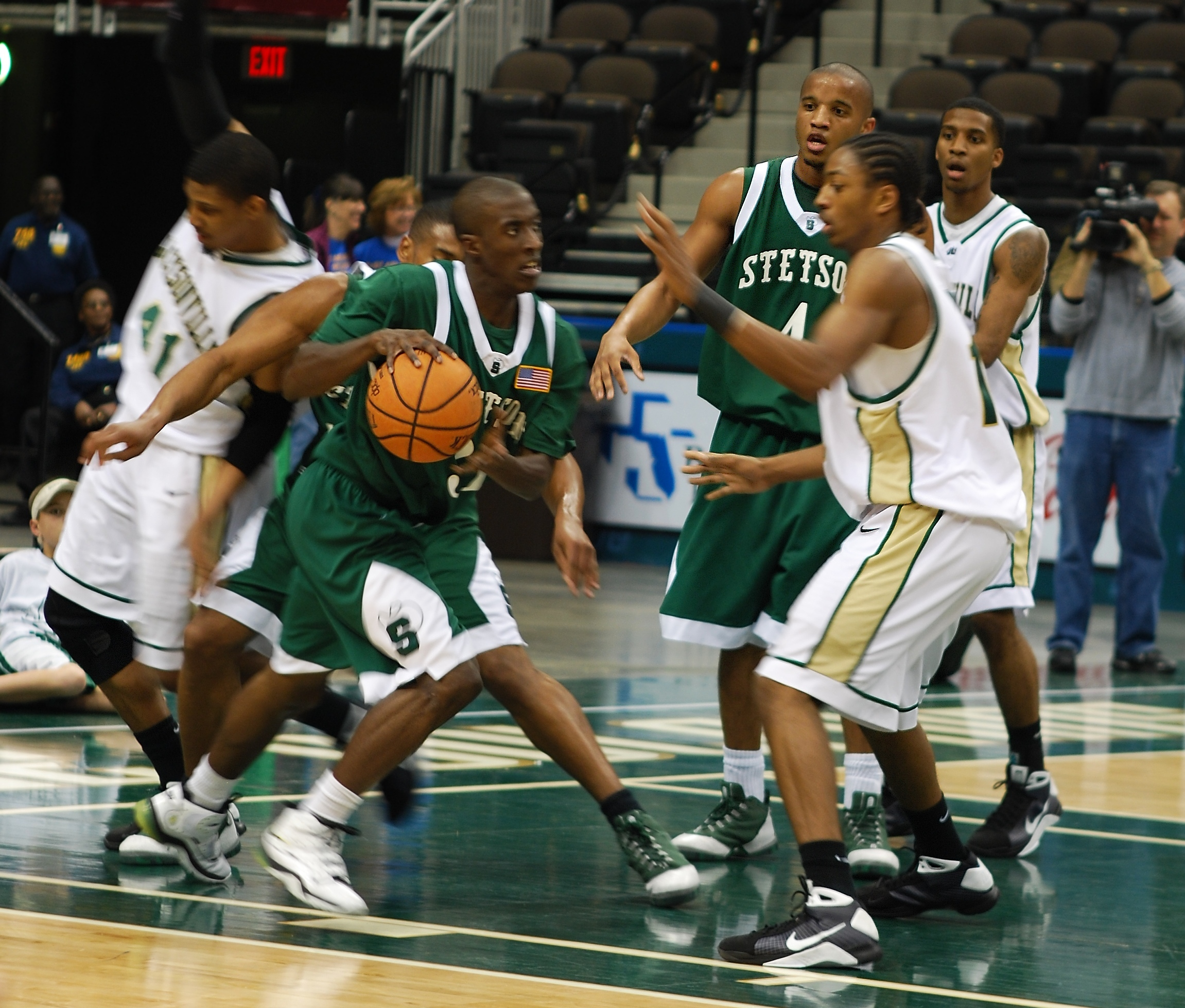
A game between Stetson and Jacksonville in 2009

The Stetson Hatters men's basketball team represents Stetson University in DeLand, Florida, United States. The team currently competes in the ASUN Conference. They play their home games at the Edmunds Center. The Hatters appeared in the NCAA Division I men's basketball tournament for the first time in program history in 2024 after winning that year's ASUN tournament.

== Postseason tournaments ==
=== NCAA Division I results ===
The Hatters have appeared in one NCAA Division I men's basketball tournament. Their combined record is 0–1.

Year	Seed	Round	Opponent	Result
2024	#16	First Round	#1 UConn	L 52–91

=== CBI results ===
The Hatters have appeared in two College Basketball Invitational (CBI) tournaments. Their combined record is 1–2.

Year	Round	Opponent	Result
2021	First round Semifinals	Bowling Green; Coastal Carolina	W 53–52; L 72–77 ^{OT}
2023	First round	Milwaukee	L 83–87 ^{OT}

=== NCAA Division II Tournament results ===
The Hatters have appeared in three NCAA Division II Tournaments. Their combined record is 3–4.

Year	Round	Opponent	Result
1967	Regional semifinals Regional 3rd-place game	Kentucky Wesleyan; Tennessee State	L 55–68; L 53–65
1970	Regional semifinals Regional Finals; Elite Eight	Mount Saint Mary's; Georgia Southern; Buffalo State	W 78–77; W 93–86; L 74–75
1971	Regional semifinals Regional 3rd-place game	Old Dominion; Roanoke	L 65–89; W 91–72

=== NAIA Tournament results ===
The Hatters have appeared in five NAIA Tournaments. Their combined record is 3–5.

Year	Round	Opponent	Result
1953	First round Second Round	Northern Iowa; Southwest Missouri State	W 75–57; L 71–98
1957	First round Second Round	Wayne State; Pacific Lutheran	W 100–84; L 83–105
1960	First round	William Jewell	L 66–68 ^{OT}
1962	First round	Cal State Fullerton	L 79–94
1963	First round Second Round	Howard Payne; Texas–Pan American	W 68–66; L 41–64

== Notable alumni ==
- Corey Walden, professional basketball player, 2019 Israeli Basketball Premier League MVP
