= Fred Taylor (basketball, born 1948) =

American basketball player (born 1948)

Personal information
- Born: February 5, 1948 (age 78) Houston, Texas, U.S.
- Listed height: 6 ft 5 in (1.96 m)
- Listed weight: 180 lb (82 kg)

Career information
- High school: Phyllis Wheatley (Houston, Texas)
- College: Texas–Pan American (1967–1970)
- NBA draft: 1970: 2nd round, 27th overall pick
- Drafted by: Phoenix Suns
- Playing career: 1970–1974
- Position: Shooting guard
- Number: 10, 23

Career history
- 1970–1971: Phoenix Suns
- 1971–1972: Cincinnati Royals
- 1973–1974: Estudiantes
- Stats at NBA.com
- Stats at Basketball Reference

Fredrick Ollie Taylor (born February 5, 1948) is an American former professional basketball player. He attended the University of Texas–Pan American and played for the Cincinnati Royals and Phoenix Suns in the NBA.

== Career statistics ==
Legend
GP	Games played	GS	Games started	MPG	Minutes per game
FG%	Field goal percentage	3P%	3-point field goal percentage	FT%	Free throw percentage
RPG	Rebounds per game	APG	Assists per game	SPG	Steals per game
BPG	Blocks per game	PPG	Points per game	**Bold**	Career high

=== NBA ===
==== Regular season ====
Year	Team	GP	MPG	FG%	FT%	RPG	APG	PPG
1970–71	Phoenix	**54**	**10.2**	**.387**	**.624**	1.6	**.9**	**5.5**
1971–72	Phoenix	13	5.3	.222	.308	1.3	.5	1.2
1971–72	Cincinnati	21	**10.2**	.333	.579	**1.8**	.5	3.4
Career		88	9.5	.364	.592	1.6	.8	4.4
