= Al Ogletree =

American baseball coach (1930–2019)

Biographical details
- Born: February 5, 1930; San Antonio, Texas, U.S.
- Died: June 24, 2019 (aged 89); McAllen, Texas, U.S.

Playing career
- 1949–1951: Texas A&M
- Position: Catcher

Coaching career (HC unless noted)
- 1958–1965: Dallas
- 1966–1968: Sul Ross State
- 1969–1997: Pan American/Texas–Pan American

Head coaching record
- Overall: 1,208–710–1 (.630) (college)

Alfred H. Ogletree (February 5, 1930 – June 24, 2019) was an American baseball coach in NCAA Division I college baseball.

== Early life ==
Ogletree was born in San Antonio, Texas. He attended school at Texas A&M University, graduating in 1952. Four years later, he earned a master's degree. He played in the minors for two years while also spending time in the Army as an officer for two years.

== Career ==
He served as head coach at Dallas, Sul Ross State University, and the University of Texas–Pan American. He coached Dallas to an 82–45 record over seven years and coached Sul Ross State to a 50–46 record over three years, winning a NAIA District 8 North Zone championship with Dallas in 1964. His greatest success came with Pan-American, of which he served as head coach from 1969 to 1997. He was inducted into UTPA's inaugural Athletics Hall of Fame. Ogletree went 1,084–618–1 record at Pan American.

Ogletree, hired by athletic director Jim Brooks, led Pan American to their first-ever College World Series appearance in the 1971 College World Series tournament. In his career with the Broncs, he led them to 12 appearances in the NCAA tournament. The Broncs finished fourth overall that year. Ogletree was also selected as The Sporting News National Coach of the Year, Coach of the Year honors by the NCAA District VI, Texas Sports Writers' Association and South Plains Professional Scouts Association. On March 14, 1989, he won his 1,000th game in NCAA Division I against Miami University at home. This victory would later be honored with a plaque. In his first twenty seasons (1969 to 1989) coaching the Broncs, he led them to a season of .500 or better in each of those seasons, with only five losing seasons in 29 seasons. He has been inducted into the Austin High School Hall of Fame, Texas A&M University Hall of Fame, American Baseball Coaches Association Hall of Fame, Rio Grande Valley Hall of Fame, Central Texas Semi-Pro Hall of Fame, University of Dallas Hall of Fame, Sul Ross State University Hall of Fame and Texas Sports Hall of Fame. He was awarded a Presidential Pillar Award from the school in 2015.

== Head coaching record ==
Record table
Season	Team	Overall	Conference	Standing	Postseason
Pan American Broncs (Independent) (1969–1997)
1969	Pan–American	24–11			
1970	Pan–American	32–12			NCAA Regional
1971	Pan–American	44–9			College World Series
1972	Pan–American	40–16			NCAA Regional
1973	Pan–American	31–17			NCAA Regional
1974	Pan–American	50–11			NCAA Regional
1975	Pan–American	63–7			NCAA Regional
1976	Pan–American	53–19			NCAA Regional
1977	Pan–American	44–30			
1978	Pan–American	52–17			NCAA Regional
1979	Pan–American	52–12			NCAA Regional
1980	Pan–American	61–18			NCAA Regional
1981	Pan–American	32–22			
1982	Pan–American	28–28			
1983	Pan–American	64–19–1			NCAA Regional
1984	Pan–American	31–28			
1985	Pan–American	39–20			
1986	Pan–American	42–19			NCAA Regional
1987	Pan–American	40–20			
Pan American/Texas–Pan American Broncs (American South Conference) (1988–1991)
1988	Pan–American	33–25	8–9		
1989	Pan–American	26–27	6–9		
1990	Texas–Pan American	30–26	5–10		
1991	Texas–Pan American	37–21	5–10		
Texas–Pan American Broncs (Sun Belt Conference) (1992–1997)
1992	Texas–Pan American	29–23	6–13		
1993	Texas–Pan American	23–33	5–16		
1994	Texas–Pan American	11–39	4–20		
1995	Texas–Pan American	17–37	8–19		
1996	Texas–Pan American	25–30	11–15		
1997	Texas–Pan American	30–22	14–12		
Total:		1,084–618–1			
National champion Postseason invitational champion Conference regular season champion Conference regular season and conference tournament champion Division regular season champion Division regular season and conference tournament champion Conference tournament champion

== Personal life ==
Ogletree married Alice Joann in 1952, with the couple remaining married for 62 years, having five children before her death on May 21, 2014. Ogletree died June 24, 2019.

== See also ==
- List of college baseball career coaching wins leaders
