= Bill White (basketball, born 1936) =

American basketball coach

Biographical details
- Born: October 21, 1936
- Died: August 7, 1999 (aged 62); Rockingham, North Carolina, U.S.

Coaching career (HC unless noted)
- 1965–1969: Oral Roberts
- 1976–1982: Pan American

Head coaching record
- Overall: 159–101
- Tournaments: 0–1 (NIT)

Bill White (October 21, 1936 – August 7, 1999) was an American basketball coach.

== Coaching career ==
He was the first head coach of the Oral Roberts Golden Eagles men's basketball team, and he helped lay the groundwork for the university's athletic and health education departments. While at the university, White compiled a record of 65–35, which ranks him as the third winningest coach in school history. Prior to taking the head coaching position at the program, White established the basketball program at Emmanuel College in Franklin Springs, Georgia.

After leaving Oral Roberts University, White coached at the University of Corpus Christi (now known as Texas A&M University-Corpus Christi), and subsequently left to become an assistant to coach Abe Lemons at Pan American University (now the University of Texas Rio Grande Valley) Upon the departure of Lemons to the University of Texas, White was named the head coach and athletic director at Pan American in 1976. While at Pan American, White led the Broncs to their first post-season tournament play at the Division I level. During the 1980–81 season, Pan American earned a berth to the 1981 National Invitation Tournament. The Broncs lost to the 1981 NIT champs, the University of Tulsa Hurricanes, coached by Nolan Richardson. That year the Broncs also were able to post a regular-season upset win over the eventual NCAA Champion Indiana Hoosiers coached by Bobby Knight. White compiled a 94–66 record while at Pan American, the third best in school history behind Abe Lemons and Sam Williams. Lon Kruger replaced White in 1982 as Pan American's head basketball coach.

== Personal life ==
With his wife Lois, the Whites had three children, which resulted in two grandchildren. On August 7, 1999, White died of a heart attack at the age of 62.

== Head coaching record ==
Record table
Season	Team	Overall	Conference	Standing	Postseason
Oral Roberts Titans (Independent) (1965–1969)
1965–66	Oral Roberts	16–10			
1966–67	Oral Roberts	17–9			
1967–68	Oral Roberts	18–6			
1968–69	Oral Roberts	14–10			
Oral Roberts:		65–35 (.650)			
Pan American Broncs (Independent) (1976–1978)
1976–77	Pan American	17–9			
1977–78	Pan American	22–4			
Pan American Broncs (TAAC) (1978–1980)
1978–79	Pan American	13–13			
1979–80	Pan American	19–9			
Pan American Broncs (Independent) (1980–1982)
1980–81	Pan American	18–11			NIT First Round
1981–82	Pan American	5–20			
Pan American:		94–66 (.588)			
Total:		94–66 (.588)			
