= Lucious Jackson =

American basketball player (1941–2022)

Personal information
- Born: October 31, 1941 San Marcos, Texas, U.S.
- Died: October 12, 2022 (aged 80) Houston, Texas, U.S.
- Listed height: 6 ft 9 in (2.06 m)
- Listed weight: 240 lb (109 kg)

Career information
- High school: Morehouse (Bastrop, Louisiana)
- College: Texas Southern (1960–1961); Texas–Rio Grande Valley (1961–1964)
- NBA draft: 1964: 1st round, 4th overall pick
- Drafted by: Philadelphia 76ers
- Playing career: 1964–1972
- Position: Power forward / center
- Number: 54

Career history
- 1964–1972: Philadelphia 76ers

Career highlights
- NBA champion (1967); NBA All-Star (1965); NBA All-Rookie First Team (1965); 2× NAIA tournament MVP (1963, 1964); No. 54 retired by UTRGV Vaqueros

Career statistics
- Points: 5,170 (9.9 ppg)
- Rebounds: 4,613 (8.8 rpg)
- Assists: 818 (1.6 apg)
- Stats at NBA.com
- Stats at Basketball Reference
Medals
Men's basketball
Representing the United States
Olympic Games
Gold medal – first place	1964 Tokyo	Team competition
Pan American Games
Gold medal – first place	1963 São Paulo	Team competition

Lucious Brown Jackson (October 31, 1941 – October 12, 2022), also known as Luke Jackson, was an American professional basketball player. A power forward and center, he played for the Philadelphia 76ers of the National Basketball Association (NBA) from 1964 to 1972. He was named an NBA All-Star in 1965, and won an NBA championship with the 76ers in 1967. Jackson also played for the U.S. national team in the 1964 Summer Olympics.

== Biography ==
=== Amateur career ===
Jackson was born on October 31, 1941, in San Marcos, Texas, and his family moved to Bastrop, Louisiana, when he was in high school because San Marcos would not allow him to play for their all-white basketball team. He graduated from Morehouse High School in Bastrop. He attended Pan American College and played college basketball for the Pan American Broncs. In 1963, United Press International named Jackson an All-American. He won the Chuck Taylor Most Valuable Player Award in the NAIA Men's Basketball Championships in 1963 and 1964.

Jackson played for the United States men's national basketball team at the 1963 Pan American Games and the 1963 FIBA World Championship. He was a member of the U.S. Olympic basketball team that won the gold at the 1964 Summer Olympics in Tokyo.

=== Professional career ===
The 76ers selected Jackson in the first round, with the fourth overall pick, in the 1964 NBA draft. He played eight seasons (1964–1972) with the Philadelphia 76ers in the NBA. A 6-foot, 9-inch (2.06 m) power forward who played center occasionally. He played in the 1965 NBA All-Star Game. After the season, he was named to the NBA's 1964–65 All-Rookie Team after averaging 14.8 points and 12.9 rebounds per game.

A teammate of Wilt Chamberlain, Jackson was a starter on the 1966–67 Philadelphia championship team that ended the Boston Celtics' string of eight straight NBA championships. He scored 13 points and had 21 rebounds in the title-clinching game over the San Francisco Warriors in the 1967 NBA Finals. After the 1968 season, the 76ers traded Chamberlain to the Lakers, and the 76ers moved Jackson back to center. Before the 1969–70 season, Jackson defected to the Carolina Cougars of the rival American Basketball Association. A few days later, he reneged on the agreement with Carolina, returning to the 76ers. He missed time during the season with an Achilles injury and a collapsed lung. Jackson continued to experience chronic injuries to his left foot, including a tendon and a toe bone. He retired after the 1971–72 season.

=== Personal life and death ===
Jackson and his wife, Marva, were married for 57 years before his death. After his retirement from basketball, they settled in Beaumont, Texas, Marva's hometown, in 1973. He finished his degree at Pan American University and worked for the Beaumont Parks and Recreation Department starting in 1975. He retired in 2002. They had three children, all of whom played basketball at West Brook High School and collegiately. Nicole and Andrea played for the University of North Texas and Lucious III played for Syracuse University.

The 1990s all-female rock band Luscious Jackson chose their name as inspiration from Lucious Jackson.

Jackson died from heart failure in Houston, Texas, on October 12, 2022, at the age of 80.

== NBA career statistics ==
Legend
GP	Games played	GS	Games started	MPG	Minutes per game
FG%	Field goal percentage	3P%	3-point field goal percentage	FT%	Free throw percentage
RPG	Rebounds per game	APG	Assists per game	SPG	Steals per game
BPG	Blocks per game	PPG	Points per game	**Bold**	Career high
†	Won an NBA championship

=== Regular season ===
Year	Team	GP	GS	MPG	FG%	FT%	RPG	APG	PPG
1964–65	Philadelphia	76		**34.1**	.414	.713	**12.9**	1.2	**14.8**
1965–66	Philadelphia	79		24.9	.401	.738	8.6	1.7	8.2
1966–67†	Philadelphia	81		29.3	**.438**	**.759**	8.9	1.4	12.0
1967–68	Philadelphia	**82**		31.3	.433	.719	10.6	1.7	11.8
1968–69	Philadelphia	25		33.6	.437	.711	11.4	**2.2**	14.4
1969–70	Philadelphia	37		15.8	.392	.741	5.4	1.4	5.5
1970–71	Philadelphia	79	**40**	22.5	.376	.693	7.2	1.9	6.7
1971–72	Philadelphia	63	22	17.2	.396	.692	4.9	1.4	5.8
Career		522	62	26.4	.415	.722	8.8	1.6	9.9

=== Playoffs ===
Year	Team	GP	MPG	FG%	FT%	RPG	APG	PPG
1965	Philadelphia	11	29.2	.338	.781	7.2	**2.2**	10.3
1966	Philadelphia	5	32.6	.429	.818	8.8	1.6	**12.0**
1967†	Philadelphia	**15**	**36.2**	.398	.725	**11.7**	2.0	11.0
1968	Philadelphia	13	33.2	.392	.686	8.8	1.2	11.4
1970	Philadelphia	5	14.6	**.474**	**1.000**	6.6	.6	4.0
1971	Philadelphia	7	22.9	.421	.700	8.7	1.6	5.6
Career		56	30.2	.389	.743	9.1	1.6	9.7
