= 1963 NAIA basketball tournament =

College basketball tournament

1963 NAIA men's basketball tournament
- Season: 1962–63
- Teams: 32
- Finals site: Municipal Auditorium; Kansas City, Missouri
- Champions: Pan American (Texas) (1st title, 1st title game, 1st Final Four)
- Runner-up: Western Carolina (N.C.) (1st title game, 1st Final Four)
- Semifinalists: Grambling (La.) (2nd Final Four); Fort Hays State (Kan.) (2nd Final Four)
- Coach of the year: Fred Hodby (Grambling (La.))
- Charles Stevenson Hustle Award: Gil Luttrell (Carson–Newman (Tenn.))
- MVP: Lucious Jackson (Pan American (Texas))
- Top scorers: Mel Gibson (Western Carolina); Willis Reed (Grambling (La.)) (137 points)

The 1963 NAIA men's basketball tournament was held March 11–16 at Municipal Auditorium in Kansas City, Missouri. The 26th annual NAIA basketball tournament featured 32 teams playing in a single-elimination format. This tournament did not feature any games going into overtime. This was the first tournament to feature a Leading Scorer, and Leading Rebounder awards. They were presented to Mel Gibson, Willis Reed and Lucious Jackson respectively. In the inaugural year of the Leading Scorer award, there was a tie. This would not happen again until 1981.

== Awards and honors ==
- Leading scorers; tie: Mel Gibson, Western Carolina (N.C.) 5 games, 60 field goals 17 free throws 137 total points (27.4 average points per game) and Willis Reed, Grambling (La.) 5 games, 58 field goals, 21 free throws, 137 total points (27.4 average points per game)
- Leading rebounder: Lucious Jackson, Pan American (Texas), 5 games, 93 rebounds (18.6 rebounds per game)
- Player of the Year: est. 1994
- Most rebounds; career continues: 180, Lucious Jackson, Pan American (Texas), (1962,63,64)
- All-time leading scorer; second appearance: Lucious Jackson, 7th Pan American (Texas) (1962,63,64), 12 games, 117 field goals, 67 free throws, 301 total points, 25.0 average per game; Willis Reed, 16th Grambling (La.) (1961,63,64), 12 games 108 field goals 39 free throws 265 total points, 22.8 average per
- All-time leading scorer; final appearance: Hershell West, 15th Grambling (La.) (1960,61,63), 13 games, 116 field goals, 37 free throws, 269 total points, 20.7 average per game.

== 1963 NAIA bracket ==
First round	Second round
1	Grambling State (La.)	76
-	Arkansas Tech	59
1	Grambling State	56
-	Athens	45
-	Athens (Ala.)	72
16	Central Connecticut State	71
TOP TIER
9	Carson-Newman (Tenn.)	83
-	Rider (N.J.)	57
9	Carson-Newman	70
8	Indiana State	63
-	Parsons College (Iowa)	77
8	Indiana State	78
5	Howard Payne (Tex.)	66
-	Stetson (Fla.)	68
-	Stetson	41
12	Pan American	64
-	Peru State College (Neb.)	48
12	Pan American (Tex.)	83
TOP TIER
13	Northern Michigan	72
-	California Western	52
13	Northern Michigan	101
-	Central State (Ohio)	87
-	Central State (Ohio)	71
4	Oklahoma Baptist	70
3	Winston-Salem State (N.C.)	60
-	Transylvania (Ky.)	64
-	Transylvania	80
14	Lewis & Clark	88
-	Oshkosh State (Wis.)	74
14	Lewis & Clark (Ore.)	75
BOTTOM TIER
7	Western Illinois	81
-	Miles College (Ala.)	84
-	Miles	86
10	Western Carolina	107
-	Eastern Montana	61
10	Western Carolina (N.C.)	64
11	Alliance College (Penn.)	76
-	Yankton College (S.D.)	68
11	Alliance	53
6	Rockhurst	64
-	Pacific Lutheran (Wash.)	77
6	Rockhurst (Mo.)	83
BOTTOM TIER
15	Fort Hays State (Kan.)	95
-	Eastern New Mexico	69
15	Fort Hays State	82
2	Augsburg	71
-	West Virginia State	57
2	Augsburg College (Minn.)	67

Elite Eight
1	Grambling State	79
9	Carson-Newman	70
12	Pan American	99
13	Northern Michigan	73
14	Lewis & Clark	57
10	Western Carolina	77
6	Rockhurst	76
15	Fort Hays State	96

NAIA national semifinals
1	Grambling State	83
12	Pan American	90
10	Western Carolina	100
-	Fort Hays State	84

NAIA national championship
12	Pan American	73
10	Western Carolina	62

=== Third-place game ===
The third-place game featured the losing teams from the national semifinalist to determine 3rd and 4th places in the tournament. This game was played until 1988.

NAIA third-place game
1	Grambling State	107
15	Fort Hays State	86

== See also ==
- 1963 NCAA University Division basketball tournament
- 1963 NCAA College Division basketball tournament
