= University of Texas Rio Grande Valley =

Public university in Edinburg, Texas, US

The University of Texas Rio Grande Valley
- Former names: Texas Southmost College (1930–1995); Edinburg College (1932–1952); Pan American College (1952–1971); Pan American University (1971–1989); Pan American University at Brownsville (1988–1989); University of Texas Pan American (1989–2015); University of Texas Pan American at Brownsville (1989–1991); University of Texas at Brownsville (1991–2016)
- Motto: Disciplina Praesidium Civitatis (Latin)
- Motto in English: "The cultivated mind is the guardian genius of democracy"
- Type: Public research university
- Established: June 14, 2013 (as UTRGV)
- Parent institution: University of Texas System
- Accreditation: SACS
- Academic affiliations: Space-grant
- Endowment: $190.5 million (FY2024) (UTRGV only) $47.47 billion (FY2024) (system-wide)
- Budget: $744.6 million (FY2025)
- President: Guy Bailey
- Provost: Luis H. Zayas
- Academic staff: 1,797 (fall 2023)
- Administrative staff: 352 (fall 2024)
- Total staff: 6,178 (fall 2024)
- Students: 36,466 (fall 2026)
- Undergraduates: 28,674 (fall 2024)
- Postgraduates: 5,207 (fall 2024)
- Location: Edinburg, Texas, United States; 26.304551°N 98.174165°W
- Campus: 665 acres (2.69 km^{2}); Midsize City
- Other campuses: Brownsville; Harlingen; McAllen; Port Isabel; Rio Grande City; South Padre Island
- Newspaper: The Rider
- Colors: Orange; Gray
- Nickname: Vaqueros
- Sporting affiliations: NCAA Division I – Southland (FCS, starting in 2025)
- Mascot: Vaqueros
- Website: www.utrgv.edu

The University of Texas Rio Grande Valley (UTRGV) is a public research university with its main campus in Edinburg, Texas, United States, and multiple other campuses throughout the Rio Grande Valley. It is the southernmost member of the University of Texas System. The University of Texas Rio Grande Valley was created by the Texas legislature in 2013 after the consolidation of the University of Texas at Brownsville and the University of Texas–Pan American.

In the fall of 2026, the University of Texas Rio Grande Valley enrolled 36,466 students, making it the ninth-largest university in the state of Texas and the fourth-largest (student enrollment) academic institution in the University of Texas system. In 2018, UTRGV was also one of the largest universities in the U.S. to have a majority Hispanic student population; 67% of its students are Hispanic, virtually all of them Mexican Americans.

It was classified in 2020 among "R2: Doctoral Universities – High research activity".

== History ==
On December 6, 2012, the University of Texas System Board of Regents approved a proposal to merge the University of Texas–Pan American and the University of Texas at Brownsville into a new university. In June 2013, the governor of Texas Rick Perry signed legislation creating the university. In December 2013, the UT System Board of Regents voted to name the university the University of Texas Rio Grande Valley (UTRGV).

The board of regents named Guy Bailey as the founding university president. Bailey appointed Havidán Rodríguez as the founding provost and executive vice president for academic affairs and Janna Arney as deputy president.

In November 2014, the UT System Board of Regents approved the "Vaqueros" as the athletic nickname for University of Texas Rio Grande Valley. They also approved the official colors of blue, green, and orange. The university opened on August 31, 2015.

== Campuses ==
The university has two main campuses: in Brownsville, Texas at the former University of Texas at Brownsville and Edinburg, Texas at the former University of Texas–Pan American. It has research and clinical locations in McAllen, Harlingen, Rio Grande City, and on South Padre Island.

== Academics ==
=== Rankings ===
Academic rankings

National
- U.S. News & World Report: 213 (tie)
- Washington Monthly: 58
- WSJ/College Pulse: 256

Global
- ARWU: 801-900
- THE: 1,201-1,500
- U.S. News & World Report: 966 (tie)

UTRGV offers 86 bachelor's, 75 master's, and 15 doctoral programs. For the academic year 2015–2016, 92.7% of enrolled students came from the Cameron, Hidalgo, Starr, and Willacy counties. The ethnic enrollment is 89.2% Hispanic (Fall 2017).

In 2017, Hispanic Outlook in Higher Education magazine ranked UTRGV 3rd in the country in awarding bachelor's degrees to Hispanic students.

In 2024, Washington Monthly ranked UTRGV 58th among 438 national universities in the U.S. based on UTRGV's contribution to the public good, as measured by social mobility, research, and promoting public service.

=== Financial aid ===
In 2017, the University of Texas Rio Grande Valley was ranked No. 6 (out of 56 Texas universities) for lowest student loan debt in the state of Texas.

=== Colleges and schools ===
Eleven colleges and schools formed the academic foundation for UTRGV, including:

UTRGV college/school founding
College/school	Year founded
College of Education and P-16 Integration	2015
College of Engineering and Computer Science	2015
College of Fine Arts	2015
College of Health Affairs	2015
College of Liberal Arts	2015
College of Medicine and Health Affairs	2016
College of Sciences	2015
Graduate College	2015
Honors College	2015
Robert C. Vackar College of Business and Entrepreneurship	2015
School of Medicine	2015
University College	2015

=== Accreditation ===
UTRGV is accredited by the Southern Association of Colleges and Schools (SACS). UTRGV was placed on probation by SACS from December 2016 through December 2018, initially because of concerns surrounding the process of dissolution of the University of Texas at Brownsville, and later for review of a state audit report.

The UTRGV School of Medicine received preliminary accreditation from the Liaison Committee on Medical Education in October 2016. In May 2016, the School of Medicine received accreditation from the Accreditation Council for Graduate Medical Education to offer a medical residency program in psychiatry.

=== Proposed expansions ===
On May 21, 2019, the Texas House of Representatives voted to approve legislation to create a law school at UTRGV.

== Student life ==
Undergraduate demographics as of Fall 2023
Race and ethnicity	Total
Hispanic	94%
International student	2%
White	2%
Asian	1%
Black	1%
Unknown	1%
Economic diversity
Low-income (Note: The percentage of students who received an income-based federal Pell grant intended for low-income students.)	63%
Affluent (Note: The percentage of students who are a part of the American middle class at the bare minimum.)	37%

== Athletics ==
The merged university inherited UTPA's Division I membership; most of the athletic facilities are located in Edinburg. They have membership with the Southland Conference, having left the Western Athletic Conference in 2024. Only the men's soccer and women's swimming programs still compete in the WAC.

On 1st May, the women’s tennis team won the institution's first WAC Tournament Championship en route to its first NCAA Tournament appearance.

On November 19, 2016, the UTRGV women's volleyball team defeated the Utah Valley women's volleyball team, making them the Western Athletic Conference (WAC) Volleyball Champions of 2016.

=== Mascot ===
The choice of a new university nickname was met with some contention from members of the communities of the two merged schools. UTPA supporters, the larger of the two merged schools, argued for keeping the UTPA nickname, Broncs, while UTB supporters wanted a nickname new to both merged schools. UTPA Alumnus Alex Del Barrio created a petition to "Say No To Vaqueros" that garnered over 11,000 signatures after the announcement was made. Several local city councils also passed resolutions in support of one option or the other. President Guy Bailey recommended a new nickname, Vaqueros, to the University of Texas System Board of Regents on November 5, 2014. The suggestion for Vaquero was inspired by the UTPA student Studio Art projects, where the Toro and Vaquero were the most popular projects.

Bailey also recommended school's athletic colors be UT System orange, green (formerly the secondary color of UTPA), and blue (formerly the secondary color of UTB).

The announcement to the decision generated a swift and mainly negative reaction from some UTPA supporters on social media. These supporters, displeased that the Broncs was being moved to the wayside, determined the name was culturally insensitive, racist, and sexist. Nevertheless, the UT System Board of Regents approved the recommendation the following day, making Vaqueros the fifth NCAA Division I nickname that is a Spanish language word after the Cal State Northridge Matadors, UC Santa Barbara Gauchos, San Diego Toreros, and New Mexico Lobos. Bailey considered the decision "final" following the approval by the board of regents. About 500 students protested against the Vaquero mascot on the UTPA campus on 13 November 2014. A petition calling for Bailey's immediate resignation garnered more than 700 signatures. Articles of impeachment were filed against the Student Government President Alberto Adame and Vice President Carla "Fernanda" Pena by Jonathan Lee Salinas (Senator at Large '14–'15) partly for their roles in the mascot committee, though the impeachment process was ended due to insufficient evidence. Following the protests, the UT System issued a press release supporting the "Vaquero" decision.

At the height of the controversy in November 2014, Texas legislator Terry Canales suggested he was considering filing a bill requiring UTRGV to abandon the Vaquero nickname. Canales submitted HB901 in January 2015. If passed, the legislation would require UTRGV to hold a student election for the athletics nickname, with "Broncs" and "Ocelots" on the ballot.

The mascot design was revealed in February 2015. The logo features an orange faced rider in green on a navy blue and green horse. The logo features an outline of Texas in the negative space between the legs of the horse.

In June 2019 the new design for the Vaquero mascot was revealed. The new costumed version was voted on and created by UTRGV students.

== Notable alumni (including UTPA and UTB/TSC) ==
- Pablo Almaguer: chair of the State Bar of Texas Board of Directors
- Gloria Anzaldúa: novelist, educator, cultural theorist
- Jose Luis Betancourt, Jr.: retired Rear Admiral of the United States Navy
- Mike Brisky: former member of the PGA
- Minerva G. Carcaño: bishop
- Oscar Cásares: writer
- Mire Chatman: Euro Basketball player
- Kika de la Garza: former U.S. congressman
- Dan Firova: former MLB baseball player and current Mexican League manager
- William Garrison: retired major general of the United States Army
- Apple Green: retired NBA player
- Greg Guy: former NCAA basketball scoring champion
- Jim Hickey: MLB pitching coach
- Perry Hill: MLB assistant coach
- Juan "Chuy" Hinojosa: Texas state senator
- Rubén Hinojosa: U.S. congressman
- Lucious Jackson: Olympic gold medalist and NBA player
- Rossy Evelin Lima: poet
- Eddie Lucio: Texas state senator
- Glenn Martinez: dean, College of Liberal and Fine Arts, University of Texas San Antonio
- Otto Moore: retired NBA player
- Valente Rodriguez: actor
- Marshall Rogers: former NCAA Basketball scoring champion
- Rogelio Sáenz: dean, College of Public Policy, University of Texas San Antonio
- Paul Michael Stoll (born 1985): American-Mexican basketball player
- Fred Taylor: retired NBA player
- Jim Tyrone: retired MLB player and member of UTPA College World Series team
- Wayne Tyrone: retired MLB player and member of UTPA College World Series team
- George Williams: retired MLB catcher
- Jaime Zapata: U.S. Homeland Security special agent
