= University of Texas–Pan American =

Public University in Edinburg, Texas

- Motto: Latin: Disciplina praesidium civitatis
- Motto in English: Education, the Guardian of Society
- Type: Public university
- Active: 1927–2015 (merged)
- Academic affiliations: University of Texas System; CONAHEC
- Endowment: $65 million
- President: Havidan Rodriguez (interim), final
- Faculty: 836 (2012)
- Students: 20,053 (2013)
- Undergraduates: 17,602
- Postgraduates: 2,451
- Location: Edinburg, Texas, United States; 26°18′22″N 98°10′24″W
- Campus: Rural, 238 acres (0.96 km^{2})
- Colors: Green and Orange
- Nickname: Broncs
- Sporting affiliations: NCAA Division I – WAC
- Mascot: Bucky the Bronc
- Website: www.utpa.edu

The University of Texas–Pan American (UTPA) was a public university in Edinburg, Texas, United States from 1927 until 2015. Founded as Edinburg College, it was a component institution of the University of Texas System. The university served the Rio Grande Valley and South Texas with baccalaureate, master's, and doctoral degrees. The Carnegie Foundation classified UTPA as a "doctoral research university". From the institution's founding until it was merged into the University of Texas Rio Grande Valley (UTRGV), it grew from 200 students to over 20,000, making UTPA the 10th-largest university in Texas. The majority of these students were natives of the Rio Grande Valley. UTPA also operated an Upper Level Studies Center in Rio Grande City, Starr County, Texas. On August 15, 2014, Dr. Havidan Rodriguez was appointed interim President of UTPA, the institution's final leader.

In 2015, UTRGV entered into operation following the merger of UTPA and UT–Brownsville, founded as an extension of then-Pan American University at Texas Southmost College. UTRGV also created a new medical school. On August 31, 2015, UTPA formally ceased operations to yield to the newly formed university, the University of Texas Rio Grande Valley.

== History ==
=== Edinburg College ===
Edinburg College was founded in 1927 as a junior college administered by the Edinburg School District. It was formally designated as a junior college in 1933 as Edinburg Junior College, and admitted to the Association of Colleges and Secondary Schools of Southern States.

=== Pan American College ===
Hidalgo County held a referendum for a four-year university in 1951; the school became Pan American Regional College on December 20, 1951. Its name changed to Pan American College in January 1952, followed by the appointment of a board of regents. The first graduate to receive a four-year degree was Harold W. Billings, BA, in 1953. It became the 22nd member institution of the Texas System of Colleges and Universities in 1965, as a state senior college.

=== Pan American University ===
Approved to offer graduate programs in 1970, the school began with Master of Arts, Master of Education, and Master of Science degrees. In 1971, Pan American College achieved full university status and changed its name to Pan American University. In the 20-year period from 1965 to 1984, enrollment grew from 2,000 to nearly 10,000. A second campus at Brownsville was established in 1973 (which became the University of Texas at Brownsville, and later merged with the University of Texas Rio Grande Valley).

=== The University of Texas–Pan American ===
In December 1988, board members reached merger agreement with the University of Texas System pending state legislative approval (one of a series of similar mergers among state universities during that time), granted in September 1989. It adopted its final name subsequent to entry into the UT System, preserving the nearly 40-year legacy of the Pan American name.

=== Merger with UTB and Medical School ===
On December 6, 2012, University of Texas regents approved a proposal to merge UTPA, the UT-Brownsville, and a planned medical school into one regional institution. On December 12, 2013, the UT Board of Regents voted to name the new organization the University of Texas Rio Grande Valley.

On November 5, 2014, UTRGV's new nickname of Vaqueros was announced. Almost immediately, students on both campuses began objecting to the new name as a caricature and racial stereotype of Mexican, Latino, Chicano, and Hispanic culture. Two days after the new mascot was approved, the UTPA student government passed a resolution in opposition, and three days later, hundreds of students rallied on the Edinburg campus to protest the new name.

On August 31, 2015, UTB was officially dissolved and UTPA's name was changed to the University of Texas Rio Grande Valley.

== Campus ==
=== Main campus ===
UTPA's main campus, now one of the primary campuses of UTRGV, is located in the western part of Edinburg, and comprises 289 acres.

Most of the academic buildings are enclosed by or span a covered walkway over the perimeter of the original campus. In 2007, UTPA added a new wellness center, and dormitory (Unity Dormitory 2007). On the northeast corner of campus is the Edinburg Baseball Stadium, which is considered one of the premier college baseball settings. The stadium was completed in 2001.

=== Starr County Upper-Level Center ===
The Starr Country Upper-Level Center is located in Rio Grande City. The center opened in 2003 and was rededicated and moved to a new location in 2009. Most courses offered are in bilingual education. There are also limited courses in criminal justice, history, English, and anthropology. As of 2009 over 200 students have graduated from the Starr County Upper-Level Center.

=== Coastal Studies Laboratory ===
Established in 1973, the Coastal Studies Laboratory (CSL) began as UTPA's marine biology laboratory and now serves the same role for UTRGV. It is located in the city of South Padre Island, which is located about 70 miles east of main campus. The CSL offers graduate-level biology courses and houses several ecological programs that are independent of UTPA.

=== McAllen Teaching Site ===
The McAllen Teaching Site was opened in 2009 in McAllen, Texas, and offers education and business courses. The site primarily serves professionals in the city of McAllen.

== Academics ==
Pathway leading toward the Science and Engineering buildings

The university offered a wide variety of degrees spanning across seven colleges. At the time of the UTRGV merger, there were 56 bachelor's degrees, 56 master's degrees, three doctoral degrees, and two cooperative doctoral programs.

=== Colleges ===
The university included these academic divisions:

- College of Arts and Humanities
- College of Business Administration
- College of Education
- College of Engineering and Computer Science
- College of Health Sciences and Human Services
- College of Science and Mathematics
- College of Social and Behavioral Sciences
- College of Physics and Geology

=== Reserve Officers' Training Corps ===
- The University of Texas–Pan American hosted the college-based Army ROTC program, which was carried on by UTRGV.

=== Rankings ===
Academic rankings

Master's
- Washington Monthly: 19

Regional
- U.S. News & World Report: RNP (West)

National
- Forbes: 516

U.S. News & World Report rated UTPA as a tier 2 University.

In Forbes' 2009 best college rankings that heavily weighted proportion of graduates who obtain a job upon graduation, UTPA ranked 32nd among public universities and 218th among all universities. Among public schools in Texas, UTPA ranked only behind the University of Texas at Austin and Texas A&M.

In 2009 UTPA ranked behind only Florida International University for bachelor's degrees awarded to Hispanic students.

According to the U.S. government, among schools with an enrollment of at least 5,000 students, UTPA ranked as the second-most affordable school in the nation.

=== Admissions, enrollment, and retention ===
Ethnic enrollment, 2010	Male	Female	Total
Asian American	89	132	221
Hispanic	6,148	8,985	15,100
Non-Hispanic White	492	515	1,007
African American	59	56	115
Native American	8	10	18
Nonresident/unknown	455	475	930
Not stated/unknown	43	67	110
Total	7,294	10,240	17,534

Historically, UTPA had open enrollment such that any student able to graduate from an approved public or private high school was granted admission. This policy was implemented by former president Miguel Nevarez. After Nevarez retired, UTPA moved towards minimum admission standards. The minimum standards for fall 2011 admission were a diploma from a recognized high school and a combined math/verbal SAT score of 860 or an ACT score of 18. Additionally, the minimum criteria were met with a SAT score of 810 or ACT score of 17 if the applicant is in the top third of his/her graduating class or an SAT score of 760 or ACT score of 16 sufficed if the applicant was in the top quarter of his/her graduating class. Any student who graduates from a recognized Texas high school as a member of the top 10% of his/her graduating class is guaranteed admission.

In 1997, UTPA started the University Scholars Program in an attempt to retain top local high-school students. The program is an objective academic scholarship based on three tiers. The first tier is high-school graduation standing. The second tier is advanced placement testing. The third tier is standardized testing scores. UTPA guaranteed full tuition funding for any student who meets one of many objective minimum requirements in all three tiers.

UTPA's first- to second-year retention rate for full-time students was 71%. UTPA's four-year graduation rate is 13% and the 6-year graduation rate is 36%. The proportion of students who receive some sort of financial aid is 86%.

== Student life ==
=== Housing ===
All students under the age of 21 who have earned fewer than 30 credit hours are required to reside on campus unless they are married, a parent, or have a permanent residence within 60 miles of campus. UTPA offers three residence halls and one building of community of on-campus apartments. Troxel Hall and Heritage Hall are the oldest residence halls on campus, and until 2000, were the only residence options for students. Heritage Hall is an all-female residence hall. At the end of 2009, Troxel Hall closed due to low capacity. In 2000 the Bronc Village Apartments were completed on north campus and offered students 1, 2 and 4 bedroom options. In fall 2006, Unity Hall was opened as the first new residence hall in more than 30 years; it has 204 double rooms and is divided into male and female wings. Heritage Hall, Unity Hall and the Bronc Village apartments combined can hold around 800 students

== Athletics ==
=== Teams ===
Before the UTRGV merger, the University of Texas–Pan American sponsored eight men's and nine women's teams in NCAA-sanctioned sports. About a year before the merger, the UT System announced that UTRGV would inherit the UTPA athletic program, and the UTPA Broncs officially became the UTRGV Vaqueros on July 1, 2015.

Men's intercollegiate sports

- Baseball
- Basketball
- Cross-country
- Golf
- Tennis
- Track and field (indoor and outdoor)

Women's intercollegiate sports

- Basketball
- Cross-country
- Golf
- Soccer
- Tennis
- Track and field (indoor and outdoor)
- Volleyball

The University of Texas–Pan American competed in the NCAA Division I, in the Western Athletic Conference (WAC); UTRGV has maintained UTPA's WAC membership. It is one of five schools in the University of Texas System that compete in Division I. The other UT institutions that do so are Austin, El Paso, San Antonio, and Arlington.

== Notable alumni ==
- Pablo Almaguer (born 1971), chair of the State Bar of Texas Board of Directors
- Gloria E. Anzaldúa (1942–2004), novelist, educator, cultural theorist
- Jose Luis Betancourt Jr., retired rear admiral of the United States Navy
- Mike Brisky (born 1965), professional golfer, former member of the PGA
- Norma V. Cantu, chairwoman of the United States Commission on Civil Rights
- Minerva G. Carcaño (born 1954), American Methodist bishop
- Celeste De Luna (born 1974), American printmaker, educator
- Mire Chatman (born 1978), professional basketball player
- Richard Cortez (born 1943), mayor of McAllen, Texas; county judge of Hidalgo County
- Gustavo de la Viña, former Chief of the United States Border Patrol
- Dan Firova, former MLB baseball player and current Mexican League manager
- William Garrison, retired major general of the United States Army
- Apple Green, retired NBA player
- Greg Guy, former NCAA basketball scoring champion
- Jim Hickey (born 1961), MLB pitching coach
- Juan "Chuy" Hinojosa (born 1946), Texas state senator
- Perry Hill, MLB assistant coach
- Rubén Hinojosa (born 1940), Congressman
- Lucious Jackson (1941–2022), Olympic gold medalist and NBA player
- Rossy Evelin Lima, Mexican-American poet
- Eddie Lucio Jr. (born 1946), Texas state senator
- Otto Moore, retired NBA player
- José R. Rodríguez, state senator
- Valente Rodriguez, actor
- Marshall Rogers, former NCAA basketball scoring champion
- Fred Taylor, retired NBA player
- Jim Tyrone, retired MLB Player and Member of UTPA College World Series team
- Wayne Tyrone, retired MLB Player and Member of UTPA College World Series team
- George Williams (born 1969), retired MLB catcher
- Jesus Ochoa, shooter of Alex Pretti

== See also ==
- University of Texas Rio Grande Valley
