= United Athletic Conference baseball tournament =

- Conference baseball championship
- Sport: Baseball
- Conference: United Athletic Conference
- Number of teams: 8
- Format: Double-elimination tournament
- Current stadium: Hohokam Stadium
- Current location: Mesa, Arizona
- Played: 1982–present
- Last contest: 2025
- Current champion: Utah Valley (2)
- Most championships: Fresno State & Hawaii (6)
- Official website: UACSports.com Baseball

The United Athletic Conference baseball tournament is the conference championship tournament in baseball for the United Athletic Conference. The winner of the tournament receives the conference's automatic bid to the NCAA Division I baseball tournament.

== Tournament ==
The Western Athletic Conference baseball tournament is an eight team double-elimination tournament held annually at various locations throughout the United Athletic Conference region. The winner receives an automatic bid to the NCAA Division I baseball tournament. The other teams have to hope for an at-large bid.

== History ==
From 1963 to 1981, the WAC baseball champion was determined by a best of three playoff between the division champions.

The WAC baseball tournament first started in 1982. It began as a double elimination tournament involving the top two finishers in each division. The conference kept this format through 1987. In 1988, the conference discontinued divisional play and the top four finishers in the regular season advanced to the double elimination tournament. This format lasted through 1992. Divisional play again resumed in 1993. The conference did not hold a tournament and instead opted for a best of three playoff between the two divisional winners to determine the champion.

In 1997 and 1998, the WAC began a six-team tournament that included the winners of each of three divisions, along with three at-large teams. In 1999, the WAC once again eliminated divisional play. The top six finishers in the regular season advanced to the tournament. There was no tournament from 2000 until 2005. In 2006, the WAC brought back a tournament and the top six finishers in the regular season advanced to the postseason. In 2022 the WAC resumed divisional play and began an eight-team tournament with the top four teams in each division advancing.

In 2026, the conference will rebrand as the United Athletic Conference due to continual realignment that saw five members plan to depart. Sacramento State (a member only for baseball), California Baptist and Utah Valley will depart for the Big West Conference while Southern Utah and Utah Tech will depart for the Big Sky Conference. The three surviving WAC teams in Abilene Christian, Tarleton State and UT-Arlington will be joined by Austin Peay, Central Arkansas, Eastern Kentucky, North Alabama, and West Georgia from the Atlantic Sun Conference, and Little Rock from the Ohio Valley Conference after the conclusion of the 2026 season.

== Champions ==
=== By year ===
Year	Champion	Score	Runner-up	Site	MVP
No tournament from 1963–1981. A two team "best of three" playoff was held instead.
1963	Arizona	6–3, 5–0	Brigham Young	Tucson, AZ	
1964	Arizona State	7–4, 13–5	Utah	Salt Lake City, UT	
1965	Arizona State	3–2, 3–2	Utah	Phoenix, AZ	
1966	Arizona	10–2, 4–0	Wyoming	Laramie, WY	
1967	Arizona State	0–3, 6–2, 4–3	Brigham Young	Phoenix, AZ	
1968	Brigham Young	10–6, 6–7, 5–3	Arizona	Provo, UT	
1969	Arizona State	1–0, 10–0	Brigham Young	Phoenix, AZ	
1970	Arizona	10–5, 8–18, 10–8	Brigham Young	Provo, Utah	
1971	Brigham Young	0–4, 3–0, 10–4	Arizona State	Mesa, AZ	
1972	Arizona State	5–6, 20–5, 21–7	Brigham Young	Provo, UT	
1973	Arizona State	9–0, 11–0	Brigham Young	Mesa, AZ	
1974	Arizona	14–5, 16–5	Brigham Young	Provo, UT	
1975	Arizona State	4–2, 12–1	Brigham Young	Tempe, AZ	
1976	Arizona State	13–4, 19–5	Brigham Young	Tempe, AZ	
1977	Arizona State	7–2, 8–1	Brigham Young	Provo, UT	
1978	Arizona State	3–1, 6–4	Brigham Young	Tempe, AZ	
1979	Brigham Young	10–11, 10–6, 7–3	San Diego State	Provo, UT	
1980	Hawaii	9–2, 7–0	Brigham Young	Honolulu, HI	
1981	Brigham Young	11–4, 3–1	Hawaii	Provo, UT	
First tournament era (1982-1992)
1982	Hawaii	12–5	San Diego State	Honolulu, HI	
1983	BYU	10–7	San Diego State	Provo, UT	
1984	Hawaii	5–4	San Diego State	Honolulu, HI	
1985	BYU	6–4	Hawaii	Provo, UT	
1986	San Diego State	9–2	Hawaii	San Diego, CA	
1987	Hawaii	6–5	BYU	Provo, UT	
1988	BYU	3–1	San Diego State	Honolulu, HI	
1989	Hawaii	3–1, 8–2	BYU	Honolulu, HI	
1990	San Diego State	5–4 (11 innings)	BYU	Honolulu, HI	
1991	San Diego State	6–4, 7–2 (10 innings)	Hawaii	Honolulu, HI	
1992	Hawaii	5–3	New Mexico	Honolulu, HI	
No tournament from 1993–1996. A two team "best of three" playoff was held instead.
1993	Fresno State	9–6, 4–7, 4–1	Brigham Young	Fresno, CA	
1994	Brigham Young	2–1, 8–6	Fresno State	Provo, UT	
1995	Fresno State	18–3, 3–2	Brigham Young	Fresno, CA	
1996	Cal State Northridge	29–15, 9–10, 23–15	Brigham Young	Provo, UT	
Tournament era revival (1997–1999)
1997	Rice	11–1	San Diego State	San Diego, CA	
1998	Rice	15–2	Fresno State	San Diego, CA	
1999	Rice	18–3	TCU	Fresno, CA	
No tournament or playoff from 2000–2005. Third Tournament Era begins in 2006.
2006	Fresno State	8–4	Hawaii	Fresno, CA	Ozzie Lewis, Fresno State
2007	Fresno State	17–4	Nevada	Reno, NV	Brian Lapin, Fresno State
2008	Fresno State	6–4	Nevada	Ruston, LA	Steve Susdorf, Fresno State
2009	Fresno State	9–7, 5–3	New Mexico State	Honolulu, HI	Jordan Ribera, Fresno State
2010	Hawaii	9–6	Fresno State	HoHoKam Stadium • Mesa, AZ	Kolten Wong, Hawaii
2011	Fresno State	15–4	Hawaii	HoHoKam Stadium • Mesa, AZ	Dusty Robinson, Fresno State
2012	Fresno State	9–6, 4–3 (13 innings)	Sacramento State	HoHoKam Stadium • Mesa, AZ	Jordan Luplow, Fresno State
2013	UTSA	11–4	Dallas Baptist	QuikTrip Park • Grand Prairie, TX	Matt Sims, UTSA
2014	Sacramento State	10–3, 10–3	Utah Valley	Cubs Field • Mesa, AZ	Chris Lewis, Sacramento State
2015	Cal State Bakersfield	6–5 (10 innings), 5–4	Seattle	HoHoKam Stadium • Mesa, AZ	David Metzgar, CSU Bakersfield
2016	Utah Valley	4–0	Seattle	HoHoKam Stadium • Mesa, AZ	Craig Brinkerhoff, Utah Valley
2017	Sacramento State	5–0	CSU Bakersfield	HoHoKam Stadium • Mesa, AZ	Justin Dillon, Sacramento State
2018	New Mexico State	4–3	Sacramento State	HoHoKam Stadium • Mesa, AZ	Tristen Carranza, New Mexico State
2019	Sacramento State	4–3 (11 innings), 5–4	Grand Canyon	HoHoKam Stadium • Mesa, AZ	Dawsen Bacho, Sacramento State
2020	Canceled due to the COVID-19 pandemic				
2021	Grand Canyon	5–4	UTRGV	Hohokam Stadium • Mesa, AZ	Pierson Ohl, Grand Canyon
2022	New Mexico State	7–1	Abilene Christian	Hohokam Stadium • Mesa, AZ	Cal Villarreal, New Mexico State
2023	Sam Houston State	12–10, 22–1	Utah Valley	Hohokam Stadium • Mesa, AZ	Walker Janek, Sam Houston State
2024	Tarleton State	9–1	California Baptist	Hohokam Stadium • Mesa, AZ	Cole Miears, Tarleton State
2025	Utah Valley	11–9	Abilene Christian	Hohokam Stadium • Mesa, AZ	Mason Strong, Utah Valley
2026	Tarleton State	21–11	Sacramento State	Hohokam Stadium • Mesa, AZ	Raphael Smeenk, Tarleton State

=== By school ===
Team	Championships	Years
Fresno State	6	2006, 2007, 2008, 2009, 2011, 2012
Hawaii	6	1982, 1984, 1987, 1989, 1992, 2010
Rice	3	1997, 1998, 1999
San Diego State	3	1986, 1990, 1991
BYU	3	1983, 1985, 1988
Sacramento State	3	2014, 2017, 2019
New Mexico State	2	2018, 2022
Tarleton State	2	2024, 2026
Utah Valley	2	2016, 2025
Cal State Bakersfield	1	2015
Grand Canyon	1	2021
Sam Houston	1	2023
UTSA	1	2013

- Italics indicate that the program will not be a United Athletic Conference member following the WAC's 2026 rebranding.
