= Donny Harrel =

Current position
- Title: Head coach
- Team: Seattle
- Conference: WCC
- Record: 353–508–2

Biographical details
- Born: December 17, 1969 (age 56); North Bend, Oregon, U.S.
- Education: Cal State Bakersfield '95

Playing career
- 1989–1990: Taft

Coaching career (HC unless noted)
- ?: Clackamas (Asst.)
- 1995: Bakersfield (Asst.)
- 1996: Taft (Asst.)
- 1997–2002: Lane
- 2003–2004: Oregon State (Asst.)
- 2005–2008: Washington (Asst.)
- 2009–present: Seattle

Head coaching record
- Overall: 353–508–2 (NCAA); 223–92 (NJCAA)
- Tournaments: NCAA: 0–0

Accomplishments and honors

Championships
- NWAACC (1999); WAC (2016)

Awards
- 4x NWAACC Southern Division Coach of the Year (1997-99, 2003)

Donny Harrel (born December 17, 1969) is an American college baseball coach, currently serving as head coach of the Seattle Redhawks baseball team. He was named to that position in the summer of 2008 and helped re-launch the program in the 2010 season.

== Playing career ==
Harrel played at Taft College before being drafted in the 18th round of the 1990 MLB draft by the Kansas City Royals. He played two seasons in the Royals organization as a first baseman and catcher, reaching Class A.

== Coaching career ==
Harrel began his coaching career as an assistant in the junior college ranks. After serving at Clackamas, Bakersfield, and Taft, he earned the head coaching position at Lane Community College in Eugene, Oregon. Over seven seasons with the Titans, Harrel compiled a record of 223–92 and claimed the 1999 NWAACC Championship. He was named Southern Division Coach of the Year four times and helped build the program with fundraising and facilities improvements during his tenure. He also coached the Bend Elks collegiate summer team and a Eugene-based American Legion Baseball team.

He then served two seasons as an assistant at Oregon State, serving as a volunteer to facilitate the jump from junior college to major conference Division I competition. After two seasons working with outfielders and catchers, Harrel became an assistant at Washington. He served four seasons, working with infielders, hitters and helping with recruiting and several other administrative tasks. He then moved across town to Seattle to help re-establish the Redhawks baseball program. Harrel has led the program into the Western Athletic Conference, narrowly missing the conference tournament in 2013.

== Head coaching record ==
This table reflects Harrel's record as a head coach at the Division I level.

Record table
Season	Team	Overall	Conference	Standing	Postseason
Lane CC Titans (NWAACC) (1997–2003)
1997	Lane CC	28–13	20–5	1st	NWAACC Tournament
1998	Lane CC	33–10	16–7	2nd	NWAACC Runner-Up
1999	Lane CC	37–10	20–5	1st	NWAACC Champions
2000	Lane CC	35–14	20–5	2nd	NWAACC Tournament
2001	Lane CC	26–19	16–9	2nd	NWAACC Tournament
2002	Lane CC	33–14	24–6	2nd	NWAACC Tournament
2003	Lane CC	31–12	25–5	1st	NWAACC Tournament
Lane CC:		223–92	141–42		
Seattle Redhawks (Independent) (2010–2012)
2010	Seattle	11–39			
2011	Seattle	22–29–1			
2012	Seattle	23–30			
Seattle Redhawks (Western Athletic Conference) (2013–2025)
2013	Seattle	21–33	10–6	9th (10)	
2014	Seattle	26–27	13–11	6th (10)	WAC Tournament
2015	Seattle	31–27	19–8	2nd (10)	WAC Tournament
2016	Seattle	37–21	21–5	1st (10)	WAC Tournament
2017	Seattle	20–35–1	8–16	7th (10)	WAC Tournament
2018	Seattle	32–21	13–11	4th (10)	WAC Tournament
2019	Seattle	13–39	8–19	T-8th	
2020	Seattle	7–9	0–0		Season canceled due to COVID-19
2021	Seattle	18–33	10–22	8th	WAC Tournament
2022	Seattle	16–34	11–19	5th (West)	
2023	Seattle	21–32	17–13	3rd	
2024	Seattle	17–36	10–20	9th	
2025	Seattle	20–32	8–16	9th	
Seattle:			148–166		
Seattle Redhawks (West Coast Conference) (2026–present)
2026	Seattle	18–31	11–16	9th	
Seattle:		353–508–2	11–16		
Total:		353–508–2			
National champion Postseason invitational champion Conference regular season champion Conference regular season and conference tournament champion Division regular season champion Division regular season and conference tournament champion Conference tournament champion

== See also ==
- List of current NCAA Division I baseball coaches
