= Jeremy Beard =

American baseball player and coach

Biographical details
- Born: 1972 (age 53–54)

Playing career
- 1992–1993: Linn–Benton Community College
- 1994–1995: Oregon State
- Position: Pitcher

Coaching career (HC unless noted)
- 1996–1997: Oregon State (asst)
- 1998–2001: Portland (OR) Central Catholic
- 2002–2010: Columbia Basin College (asst)
- 2011–2012: Western Nevada College (asst)
- 2014–2015: Portland (asst)
- 2016: Cal State Bakersfield (asst)
- 2017–2024: Cal State Bakersfield

Head coaching record
- Overall: 153–236
- Tournaments: WAC: 4–6; NCAA: 0–0

Jeremy Beard is an American baseball coach and former pitcher, who is the former head baseball coach of the Cal State Bakersfield Roadrunners. He played college baseball at Linn–Benton Community College from 1992 to 1993 before transferring to Oregon State where he played for coach Pat Casey.

== Playing career ==
Beard attended North Salem High School in Salem, Oregon for his first three years of high school. He transferred to Tigard High School in Tigard, Oregon for his season year. Upon graduation from high school, Beard enrolled at Linn–Benton Community College. Beard walked-on to the Linn–Benton baseball team and then walked-on to the Oregon State Beavers baseball program. Beard was 9–3 with a 3.62 ERA and 54 strikeouts in 82 innings. Beard lead the Beavers to a Pac-10 North Division title in 1994. Beard also lead the Beavers in innings pitched (91) and shutouts (1) in 1995.

== Coaching career ==
Beard joined the Oregon State coaching staff while he completed his degree. Beard was then the head coach at Central Catholic High School from 1998 to 2001.

Beard returned to the college coaching game when he was named the pitching coach at Columbia Basin College. Beard spent 8 seasons at Columbia Basin. Beard moved on to be the pitching coach for Western Nevada College from 2011 to 2012. He also served as the pitching coach for the Portland Pilots baseball team from 2014 to 2015.

In the Fall of 2015, Beard was hired as the pitching coach of the Cal State Bakersfield Roadrunners baseball program. On December 16, 2016, Cal State Bakersfield fired Bob Macaluso and named Beard the interim head coach. After going 32–24 and advancing to the 2017 Western Athletic Conference baseball tournament championship game, Beard was named the full-time head coach of the Roadrunners.

On May 28, 2024, Bakersfield announced that Beard will not return to the program after 8 seasons.

== Head coaching record ==
Statistics overview
Season	Team	Overall	Conference	Standing	Postseason
Cal State Bakersfield Roadrunners (Western Athletic Conference) (2017–2020)
2017	Cal State Bakersfield	32–24	14–10	3rd	WAC Tournament
2018	Cal State Bakersfield	21–36	10–14	6th	WAC Tournament
2019	Cal State Bakersfield	24–38	12–15	6th	WAC Tournament
2020	Cal State Bakersfield	5–9	0–0		Season canceled due to COVID-19
Cal State Bakersfield:			36-39		
Cal State Bakersfield Roadrunners (Big West Conference) (2021–2024)
2021	Cal State Bakersfield	20–23	17–19	7th	
2022	Cal State Bakersfield	18–34	11–19	9th	
2023	Cal State Bakersfield	18–34	9–21	9th	
2024	Cal State Bakersfield	15–38	8–22	9th	
Cal State Bakersfield:		153–236	45–81		
Total:		153–236			
National champion Postseason invitational champion Conference regular season champion Conference regular season and conference tournament champion Division regular season champion Division regular season and conference tournament champion Conference tournament champion
