= 2009 Cal State Bakersfield Roadrunners baseball team =

American college baseball season

2009 Cal State Bakersfield Roadrunners baseball
- Conference: Independent
- Record: 14–36
- Head coach: Bill Kernen
- Hitting coach: Jody Robinson, Bill Gentry
- Pitching coach: Dennis Machado
- Home stadium: Hardt Field

2009 NCAA Division I baseball independents standings
	Conf.				Overall
Team	W		L	PCT	W		L	PCT
Dallas Baptist ‍‍‍	38	–	17	.691	0	–	0	–
Bryant ‍‍‍	32	–	22	.593	0	–	0	–
Longwood ‍‍‍	26	–	22	.542	0	–	0	–
Le Moyne ‍‍‍	24	–	23	.511	0	–	0	–
Savannah State ‍‍‍	25	–	26	.490	0	–	0	–
NYIT ‍‍‍	19	–	29	.396	0	–	0	–
Northern Colorado ‍‍‍	18	–	35	.340	0	–	0	–
Utah Valley ‍‍‍	18	–	35	.340	0	–	0	–
North Dakota ‍‍‍	14	–	29	.326	0	–	0	–
SIU Edwardsville ‍‍‍	15	–	39	.278	0	–	0	–
Cal State Bakersfield ‍‍‍	13	–	37	.260	0	–	0	–
Texas–Pan American ‍‍‍	14	–	41	.255	0	–	0	–
Houston Baptist ‍‍‍	11	–	40	.216	0	–	0	–
North Carolina Central ‍‍‍	6	–	35	.146	0	–	0	–
NJIT ‍‍‍	4	–	33	.108	0	–	0	–
Chicago State ‍‍‍	3	–	38	.073	0	–	0	–
As of June 30, 2009; Rankings from Collegiate Baseball

The 2009 CSUB Roadrunners baseball team represented California State University, Bakersfield in the NCAA Division I baseball season of 2009. The 2009 season was the inaugural season for the Roadrunners in baseball, with CSUB beginning the transition from Division II to Division I in 2006, launching baseball in 2009, and completing the transition and eligible for the post season in 2011. A new stadium, Hardt Field, was built on the CSUB campus during the off-season and opened on opening day of the 2009 season.

The team was managed by Bill Kernen.

== Pre-season ==
In June 2006, CSUB president Horace Mitchell announced that CSUB would be moving to Division I, and entering a four-year reclassification process, which would require additional funds for the creation of a new baseball program.

In August, 2008, before the schedule for Cal State Bakersfield's inaugural baseball season was released, coach Bill Kernen confirmed that the Roadrunners would play six games against Fresno State, the defending College World Series champion. August 2008 also marked the groundbreaking of CSUB's Hardt Field, construction of which was completed in 28 weeks. The Roadrunners strength of schedule (SOS) was ranked an astounding 19th in the country.

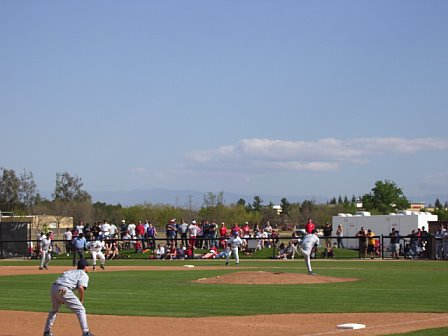
Hardt Field, Home Field of the CSUB Roadrunners

== Regular season ==
CSUB entered the 2009 Baseball season with a competitive schedule, competing against multiple teams ranked in the top 30 in Collegiate Baseball poll, along with the 2008 National Champion Fresno State Bulldogs. CSUB opened the season at home against the St. Louis Billikens, in a three-game series which marked the first winning series for the Roadrunners, finishing 2–1 in the series. The second team faced by the Roadrunners was the UC Santa Barbara Gauchos, ranked #30 in the Collegiate Baseball poll, which resulted in a 10–0 loss.

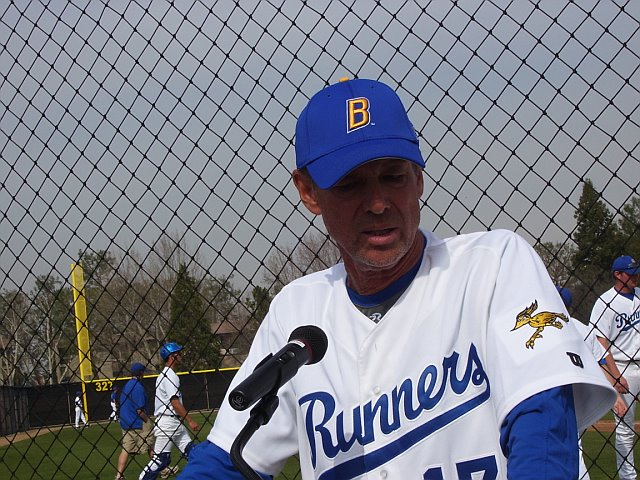
Bill Kernen, Head Coach

The 2009 Season found the team getting off to a .500 start in their first 6 games, including victories over St. Louis and Utah. However, after getting off to a good start, the Roadrunners went 1–14 in the month of March. During the course of the month, the Roadrunners met several in-state opponents, including San Jose State, St. Mary's, and San Francisco. The 'Runners also cemented a rivalry with the nearby Cal Poly Mustangs. The 'Runners also met their valley rivals, the Fresno State Bulldogs, winning one game of the three game series played in Beiden Field, and winning the first game of the homestand in a come from behind win, by a score of 17–12. The Roadrunners' 4-3 victory over the Bulldogs on April 4 marked the first time that a first-year NCAA Division I baseball program defeated the defending College World Series champions.

== Roster ==
=== Coaches ===
Name	Title	First season at CSUB	Alma mater
Bill Kernen	Head coach	2008–Present	University of Redlands (1970)
Jody Robinson	Assistant coach	2008–Present	Cal State Fullerton (1981)
Dennis Machado	Assistant coach	2008–Present	Montana State-Bozeman (2000)
Bill Gentry	Assistant coach	2008–2010	Concordia University (2002)

=== Players (Inaugural Roster, 2009) ===
Players	Number	Position	Bats/Throws	Hometown (Prev School)
Akiyama, Matthew	22	SS/2B	R/R	Torrance, Calif. (Bishop Montgomery HS)
Boren, Brandon	3	2B/3B/SS	R/R	Bakersfield, Calif. (Bakersfield College) (Stockdale HS)
Branske, Garrett	15	C/RHP	R/R	Chino, Calif. (Chino HS)
Draxton, Erik	37	RHP	R/R	Park City, Utah (Phoenix College) (Park City HS)
Escalera, Richard	11	1B	L/L	Baldwin Park, Calif. (Mt. SAC) (South Hills HS)
Gaston, Mick	10	OF	R/R	Quartz Hill, Calif. (Quartz Hill HS)
Geisinger, Derek	16	1B	L/R	Gilbert, Ariz. (Phoenix College) (Highland HS)
Henry, JJ	26	3B/OF	R/R	Denver, Colo. (Phoenix College) (Cherry Creek HS)
Jannis, Mickey	55	RHP	S/R	Sparks, Nev. (Allan Hancock College) (Arroyo Grande HS)
Jones, Sam	40	LHP	R/L	Morro Bay, Calif. (Allan Hancock College) (Morro Bay HS)
Kudlock, Jason	34	RHP/OF	R/R	Chandler, Ariz. (Chandler-Gilbert CC) (Hamilton HS)
McIntyre, Ryan	5	OF	L/R	Henderson, Nev. (Coronado HS)
Medina, Martin	30	INF/P	R/R	Ventura, Calif. (Saint Bonaventure HS)
Messmore, Spenser	28	RHP	R/R	Granada Hills, Calif. (Alemany HS)
Mills, Joey	1	OF	R/R	Englewood, Colo. (Phoenix College) (Cherry Creek HS)
Montoya, Jonathan	19	LHP	L/L	Chino Hills, Calif. (Chino Hills HS)
Richardson, Kyle	14	SS	L/R	Sacramento, Calif. (Sierra JC) (Bella Vista HS)
Rodriguez, Jeremy	7	C	S/R	Thousand Oaks, Calif. (Crespi HS)
Eric Sanchez	2	INF	R/R	Corona, Calif. (Santiago HS)
Smith, Stuart	25	OF	L/R	Ventura, Calif. (Buena HS)
Valenzuela, Jacob	12	RHP	R/R	Bakersfield, Calif. (Garces HS)
Van Dam, Brandon	18	RHP	R/R	Lancaster, Calif. (Quartz Hill HS)
Walkley, Korie	8	RHP	R/R	Bakersfield, Calif. (Centennial HS)

== Schedule and results ==
2009 CSUB Roadrunners baseball game log
Regular season

#	Date	Opponent	Score	Location	Win	Loss	Save	Att	Record
1	February 20	Saint Louis	7–8	Hardt Field	Turmail (1–0)	Jannis (0–1)		900	0–1
2	February 21	Saint Louis	4–2	Hardt Field	Draxton (1–0)	Sever (0–1)	Medina (1)	500	1–1
3	February 21	Saint Louis	8–4	Hardt Field	Montoya (1–0)	Buckham (0–1)		500	2–1
4	February 22	#30 UC Santa Barbara	0–10	Hardt Field	Hollands (1–0)	Jones (0–1)		629	2–2
5	February 22	Utah	1–12	Hardt Field	Budrow (1–0)	Jannis (0–2)		365	2–3
7	February 28	Utah	10–8	Hardt Field	Kudlock (1–0)	Askew (0–1)	Medina (2)	514	3–3
8	February 28	Utah	6–7	Hardt Field	Streich (1–0)	Medina (0–1)		514	3–4
9	March 9	Buffalo	6–7	Beiden Field	Anderson (2–2)	Messmore (0–1)			3–5
10	March 10	Fresno State	1–16	Beiden Field	Benny (1–1)	Draxton (1–1)	Morse (1)	2017	3–6
11	March 11	Portland	9–7	Beiden Field	Montoya (2–0)	Varce (1–3)	Valenzuela (1)		4–6
13	March 12	Buffalo	10–23	Beiden Field	Ciesla(1–1)	Medina (0–2)			4–7
14	March 13	Fresno State	2–3	Beiden Field	Sprague (2–0)	Branske (0–1)	Bischoff (1)	2575	4–9
15	March 14	Portland	6–10	Beiden Field	Brynteson (1–0)	Branske (0–2)			4–10
16	March 20	Cal Poly	2–6	Baggett Stadium	Eskew (4–1)	Jannis (0–3)		1012	4–11
17	March 21	Cal Poly	3–15	Baggett Stadium	Leonard (3–0)	Draxton (1–2)	Radeke (1)	1063	4–12
18	March 22	Cal Poly	2–10	Hardt Field	Mauldin (3–1)	Montoya (2–1)		638	4–13
19	March 23	Cal Poly	15–18	Hardt Field	DeVincenzi (2–0)	Jones (0–3)	Massingham (2)	398	4–14
20	March 27	San Jose State	4–8	Municipal Stadium	Berner (5–0)	Jannis (0–4)		401	4–15
21	March 28	San Jose State	10–13	Municipal Stadium	Peterson (5–0)	Montoya (2–2)		535	4–16
22	March 29	San Jose State	2–17	Municipal Stadium	Sobczak (4–0)	Van Dam (0–1)		420	4–17
23	March 30	Saint Mary's	1–3	Louis Guisto Field	Reid (2–3)	Draxton (1–3)	Berl (4)	88	4–18
24	April 1	San Francisco	4–5	Hardt Field	Oropeza (1–1)	Jones (0–4)	Mott (1)	299	4–19
25	April 3	Fresno State	8–9	Beiden Field	Kendall (1–0)	Jannis (0–5)	Sprague (1)	1951	4–20
26	April 4	Fresno State	4–3	Beiden Field	Montoya (3–2)	Garrison (4–2)		2036	5–20
27	April 5	Fresno State	2–9	Beiden Field	Sprague (3–0)	Draxton (1–4)		2158	5–21
28	April 7	Fresno State	17–12	Hardt Field	Messmore (1–1)	Bischoff (1–4)		707	6–21
29	April 8	Fresno State	3–2	Hardt Field	Medina (1–2)	Escat (0–1)		704	7–21
30	April 9	UC Riverside	2–10	Hardt Field	Bargas (4–2)	Jannis (0–6)		369	7–22
31	April 10	UC Riverside	1–6	Hardt Field	Andriese (3–1)	Montoya (3–3)		347	7–23
32	April 11	UC Riverside	9–7	Hardt Field	Medina (1–2)	Dickey (3–3)		493	8–23
33	April 14	Cal State Northridge	1–3	Matador Field	Tremlin (4–1)	Van Dam (1–1)	Slover (4)	137	8–24
34	April 15	UC Santa Barbara	7–8	Caesar Uyesaka Stadium	Ford (4–3)	Draxton (1–5)		126	8–25
35	April 21	UC Santa Barbara	2–17	Hardt Field	Meaux (3–0)	Draxton (1–6)		341	8–26
36	April 24	Nevada	6–7	Peccole Park	Graham (2–2)	Messmore (1–2)		588	8–27
37	April 25	Nevada	4–9	Peccole Park	Garcia (3–4)	Montoya (3–4)		675	8–28
38	April 26	Nevada	6–13	Peccole Park	Achelpohl (4–3)	Jannis (0–7)		904	8–29
39	April 28	UC Santa Barbara	8–6	Caesar Uyesaka Stadium	Messmore (2–2)	Meals (2–2)		203	9–29
40	April 29	Loyola Marymount	2–13	Hardt Field	McClintick (4–1)	Van Dam (0–3)		384	9–30
41	May 5	UCLA	2–15	Jackie Robinson Stadium	Claypool (2–1)	Montoya (3–5)		531	9–31
42	May 8	Nebraska	6–9	Hawks Field	Nesseth (4–4)	Medina (2–3)		2853	9–32
43	May 9	Nebraska	10–8	Hawks Field	Jannis (1–7)	Rose (1–3)		2527	10–32
44	May 10	Nebraska	8–7	Hawks Field	Montoya (4–5)	Yost (1–5)	Draxton (1)	1832	11–32

== Rankings ==
The 'Runners have yet to be ranked, and are ineligible for the post season until 2011.

== Awards and honors ==
Erik Draxton and Jason Kudlock were selected to the All-Independent Academic Team in 2009. Erik Draxton had a 3.42 gpa in Business Administration. Jason Kudlock had a 3.38 gpa in Psychology.

== Major League Baseball draft ==
In CSUB's first year of eligible draftees, the first three baseball players in CSUB's short history (2nd year) were selected in the 2010 MLB draft. Zach Arneson was selected by the San Francisco Giants in the 21st round as the 648th pick. Jason Kudlock was selected by the Texas Rangers in the 36th round as the 1096th pick. Finally, Mickey Jannis was selected by the Tampa Bay Rays as the 1331th pick.
