= 2014 Western Athletic Conference baseball tournament =

- Teams: 6
- Format: Double-elimination
- Finals site: Cubs Park; Mesa, AZ
- Champions: Sacramento State (1st title)
- Winning coach: Reggie Christiansen (1st title)
- MVP: Chris Lewis (Sacramento State)

2014 Western Athletic Conference baseball standings
	Conf.				Overall
Team	W		L	PCT	W		L	PCT
Sacramento State ‍†‍‡‍^{y}	21	–	6	.778	40	–	24	.625
Grand Canyon ‍‍‍	19	–	8	.704	30	–	23	.566
Texas–Pan American ‍‍‍	17	–	10	.630	27	–	30	.474
Utah Valley ‍‍‍	16	–	11	.593	28	–	30	.483
Cal State Bakersfield ‍‍‍	15	–	12	.556	26	–	33	.441
Seattle ‍‍‍	13	–	11	.542	26	–	27	.491
New Mexico State ‍‍‍	11	–	13	.458	23	–	31	.426
North Dakota ‍‍‍	8	–	16	.333	10	–	29	.256
Chicago State ‍‍‍	5	–	19	.208	17	–	37	.315
Northern Colorado ‍‍‍	4	–	23	.148	10	–	43	.189
† – Conference champion ‡ – Tournament champion y – Invited to the NCAA tournament Rankings from Collegiate Baseball

The 2014 Western Athletic Conference baseball tournament took place from May 21 to May 25. The top six regular season finishers of the league's ten teams met in the double-elimination tournament held at Cubs Park, spring training home of the Chicago Cubs in Mesa, Arizona. Sacramento State won the tournament for the first time, earning the Western Athletic Conference's automatic bid to the 2014 NCAA Division I baseball tournament. No team currently in the league has won a WAC Tournament Championship.

== Seeding and format ==
The top six finishers from the regular season will be seeded based on conference winning percentage. Grand Canyon was ineligible as it completed the transition to Division I.

Team	W	L	Pct	GB	Seed
Sacramento State	21	6	.778	–	1
Grand Canyon	19	8	.704	2	–
Texas–Pan American	17	10	.630	4	2
Utah Valley	16	11	.593	5	3
Cal State Bakersfield	15	12	.556	6	4
Seattle	13	11	.542	6.5	5
New Mexico State	11	13	.458	8.5	6
North Dakota	8	16	.333	11.5	–
Chicago State	5	19	.208	14	–
Northern Colorado	4	23	.148	17	–

== Bracket ==
Upper round 1	Upper round 2	Upper final	Final
1	Sacramento State	1
4	Cal State Bakersfield	6	4	Cal State Bakersfield	4
5	Seattle	5	4	Cal State Bakersfield	2
3	Utah Valley	5
2	Texas–Pan American	2
3	Utah Valley	11	3	Utah Valley	9
6	New Mexico State	10
3	Utah Valley	3	3
1	Sacramento State	10	10
Lower round 1	Lower round 2	Lower round 3	Lower final
1	Sacramento State	3
6	New Mexico State	5	4	Cal State Bakersfield	1
2	Texas–Pan American	4	1	Sacramento State	9
5	Seattle	3	6	New Mexico State	7
6	New Mexico State	7

== All-Tournament Team ==
The following players were named to the All-Tournament Team. Sacramento State's Chris Lewis, one of four Hornets selected, was named Most Valuable Player.

Name	Team
Oscar Sanay	Cal State Bakersfield
Solomon Williams	Cal State Bakersfield
Taylor Noyer	New Mexico State
Craig Brinkerhoff	Utah Valley
Andrew Freter	Utah Valley
Kade Andrus	Utah Valley
Mark Krueger	Utah Valley
Alex Palsha	Sacramento State
Rhys Hoskins	Sacramento State
Brennan Leitao	Sacramento State
Chris Lewis	Sacramento State
