= 2019 Western Athletic Conference baseball tournament =

Postseason collegiate baseball tournament

- Teams: 6
- Format: Double-elimination
- Finals site: Hohokam Stadium; Mesa, Arizona
- Champions: Sacramento State
- Television: ESPN+

2019 Western Athletic Conference baseball standings
	Conf.				Overall
Team	W		L	PCT	W		L	PCT
New Mexico State ‍†‍‍	19	–	8	.704	38	–	17	.691
Cal Baptist ‍†‍‍	19	–	8	.704	35	–	20	.636
UTRGV ‍†‍‍	19	–	8	.704	34	–	21	.618
Sacramento State ‍‍‡‍^{y}	18	–	9	.667	40	–	25	.615
Grand Canyon ‍‍‍	18	–	9	.667	36	–	24	.600
Cal State Bakersfield ‍‍‍	12	–	15	.444	24	–	35	.407
Utah Valley ‍‍‍	9	–	18	.333	15	–	41	.268
Northern Colorado ‍‍‍	8	–	19	.296	12	–	35	.255
Seattle ‍‍‍	8	–	19	.296	13	–	39	.250
Chicago State ‍‍‍	5	–	22	.185	10	–	41	.196
† – Conference champion ‡ – Tournament champion y – Invited to the NCAA tournament As of June 4, 2019; Rankings from D1Baseball

The 2019 Western Athletic Conference baseball tournament took place beginning on May 22 and ended on May 26. The top six regular season finishers of the league's ten teams met in the double-elimination tournament to be held at Hohokam Stadium, spring training home of the Oakland Athletics in Mesa, Arizona. The winner, Sacramento State, earned the Western Athletic Conference's automatic bid to the 2019 NCAA Division I baseball tournament.

== Seeding and format ==
The top six finishers from the regular season were seeded based on conference winning percentage.

== Bracket ==
Upper round 1	Upper round 2	Upper final	Final
1	New Mexico State	7
4	Grand Canyon	11	6	Utah Valley	1
5	Cal State Bakersfield	2	1	New Mexico State	3
4	Grand Canyon	8
2	Texas–Rio Grande Valley	0
3	Sacramento State	2	4	Grand Canyon	5
6	Utah Valley	4
4	Grand Canyon	3^{11}	4
3	Sacramento State	4	5
Lower round 1	Lower round 2	Lower round 3	Lower final
3	Sacramento State	6
6	Utah Valley	4	1	New Mexico State	4^{10}
3	Sacramento State	6	3	Sacramento State	6
3	Sacramento State	7	2	Texas–Rio Grande Valley	2
5	Cal State Bakersfield	3

== Conference championship ==
WAC Championship
(4) Grand Canyon Antelopes	vs.	(3) Sacramento State Hornets

May 25, 2019, 6:00 p.m. (MDT) at Hohokam Stadium in Mesa, Arizona
Team	1	2	3	4	5	6	7	8	9	10	11	R	H	E
(4) Grand Canyon	0	2	0	0	1	0	0	0	0	0	0	3	12	0
(3) Sacramento State	0	0	1	0	2	0	0	0	0	0	1	4	6	0
WP: Travis Martizia (4–1) LP: Frankie Scalzo (4–6); Home runs: GCU: None; SAC: Dawsen Bacho; Attendance: 917

May 26, 2019, 12:00 p.m. (MDT) at Hohokam Stadium in Mesa, Arizona
Team	1	2	3	4	5	6	7	8	9	R	H	E
(3) Sacramento State	1	0	2	0	0	1	0	1	0	5	12	2
(4) Grand Canyon	0	0	1	0	0	0	0	3	0	4	5	0
WP: Tanner Dalton (5–2) LP: Pierson Ohl (7–5) Sv: Austin Roberts (6); Home runs: SAC ST: Matt Smith, Dawsen Bacho, Steven Moretto; GCU: Preston Pavlica
