= Jordon Banfield =

American baseball coach

Current position
- Title: Head coach
- Team: Bakersfield
- Conference: Big West
- Record: 41–70 (.369)

Biographical details
- Born: September 2, 1986 (age 40); Ann Arbor, Michigan, U.S.
- Education: University of Michigan

Coaching career (HC unless noted)
- 2005–2007: Huron HS (MI) (asst)
- 2008: Pioneer HS (MI) (asst)
- 2014–2015: UIS (H/INF/RC)
- 2016–2017: Texas–Rio Grande Valley (H/INF/RC)
- 2020: Akron (H/INF/RC)
- 2021–2024: Oakland
- 2025–present: Bakersfield

Head coaching record
- Overall: 150–184 (.449)
- Tournaments: 0–0 NCAA

Accomplishments and honors

Awards
- Horizon League Coach of the Year (2022)

Jordon Banfield (born September 2, 1986) is an American baseball coach, who is the current head baseball of the Cal State Bakersfield Roadrunners. He graduated from the University of Michigan.

== Early life ==
Banfield attended Greenhills School in Ann Arbor, Michigan, where he was a member of the baseball and golf teams. He was a pitcher and third baseman, who was named second-team All-State Division IV in Michigan. He committed to play baseball for the Central Michigan Chippewas, but ended up attending the University of Michigan, where he studied sports management.

== Coaching career ==
Banfield began coaching baseball as an assistant at Huron High School in Ann Arbor, before becoming an assistant at Pioneer High School. Banfield went on to coach the Ann Arbor Travelers program from 2008–2012. The team made multiple appearances at the Connie Mack World Series, won 22 total tournaments in five seasons and produced 20 NCAA Division I recruits, including MLB player James Bourque. Banfield then went on to coach at Illinois Springfield, Texas Rio Grande Valley, and Akron. On May 29, 2020, Banfield was named the head baseball coach of the Oakland Golden Grizzlies.

Banfield’s second season at Oakland was by all measures the best in Division I program history. The team broke records for most regular season wins (29), total wins (31), highest Horizon League finish (2nd) and finished runner-up in the tournament.

== Head coaching record ==
Record table
Season	Team	Overall	Conference	Standing	Postseason
Oakland Golden Grizzlies (Horizon League) (2021–2024)
2021	Oakland	18–29	12–24	6th	
2022	Oakland	31–27	18–11	2nd	Horizon League Tournament
2023	Oakland	29–31	18–12	2nd	Horizon League Tournament
2024	Oakland	31–27	18–12	3rd	Horizon League Tournament
Oakland:		109–114 (.489)	66–59 (.528)		
CSU Bakserfield Roadrunners (Big West Conference) (2025–present)
2025	CSU Bakersfield	18–38	9–21	10th	
2026	CSU Bakersfield	23–32	11–19	T-9th	
CSU Bakersfield:		41–70 (.369)	20–40 (.333)		
Total:		150–184 (.449)			
