= Bill Kernen =

American baseball coach

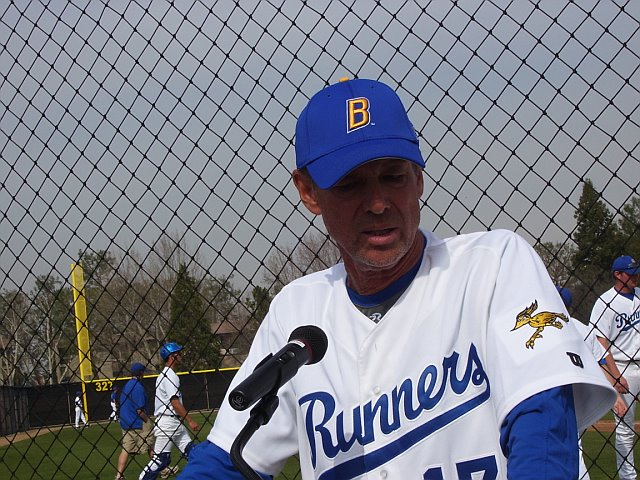
- Kernen in 2009.

Biographical details
- Born: August 1, 1948 (age 78); Boise, Idaho, U.S.

Playing career
- 1967–1970: Redlands
- Position: Pitcher

Coaching career (HC unless noted)
- 1975–1976: San Gorgonio HS
- 1977: Orange Coast (asst.)
- 1978–1982: Cal State Fullerton (asst.)
- 1987: Cal State Fullerton (asst.)
- 1988: Illinois (asst.)
- 1989–1995: Cal State Northridge
- 2002: NC State (asst.)
- 2007: Cal State Fullerton (asst.)
- 2009–2015: Cal State Bakersfield

Head coaching record
- Overall: 437–352–4 (.554)
- Tournaments: NCAA D-I: 6–8; NCAA D-II: 5–2

Accomplishments and honors

Championships
- As head coach: CCAA regular season (1990); WAC regular season (2013); WAC tournament (2015); As assistant coach: 5× SCBA (1978–1982); College World Series (1979)

Awards
- NCAA Division II West Region Coach of the Year (1990); 2× WAC Coach of the Year (2013, 2015)

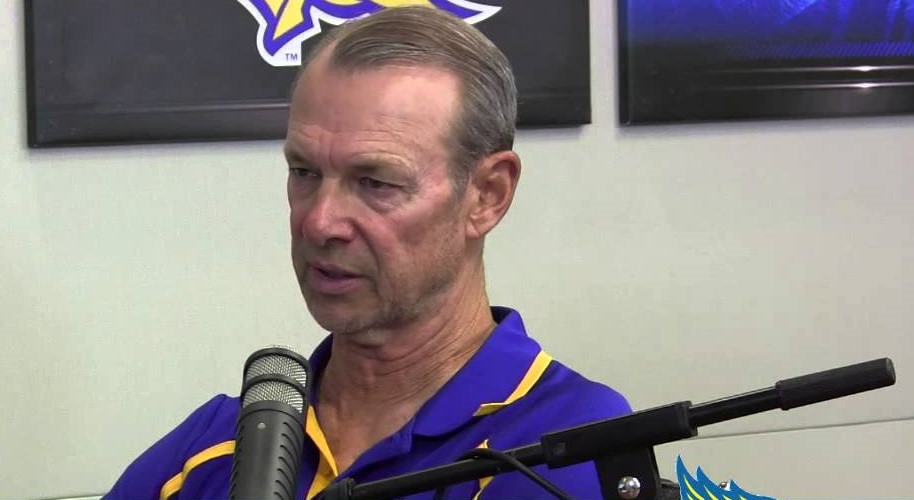

William Craig Kernen (born August 1, 1948) is an American baseball coach and playwright. He was the head coach at Cal State Northridge from 1989 to 1995 and at Cal State Bakersfield from 2009 to 2015. Other coaching positions as an assistant included North Carolina State (2001–02), Cal State Fullerton (1977–82, 1987, 2006–07), University of Illinois (1988) and Sacramento State (2019).

== Early life and education ==
Born in Boise, Idaho, Kernen graduated from San Gorgonio High School in San Bernardino, California and started his college baseball playing career in 1966 at University of Redlands. A four-year letterman for the Bulldogs, Kernen had a successful playing career as a pitcher. In 1970, his senior season, he won 11 games with a 1.26 ERA in 106 innings, earning him first-team all-conference, All-NAIA and Player of the Year honors from the SCIAC. Was named Student Athlete of the Year 1970 at University of Redlands.

Kernen completed his bachelor's degree cum laude in psychology at University of Redlands in 1970. He played two seasons of minor league baseball with the Baltimore Orioles organization, first with the Aberdeen Pheasants in 1970 and Stockton Ports in 1971.

== Coaching career ==
=== High school and college assistant (1975–1988) ===
Kernen began his head coaching career for his alma mater, San Gorgonio High School, spending two years with the program from 1975 to 1976 before moving up to the junior college level as pitching coach at Orange Coast College in 1977.

From 1977 to 1982 and again in 1987, Kernen was pitching coach at Cal State Fullerton under Augie Garrido. Kernen helped to turn the Titans into a perennial postseason contender winning the Big West Conference 5 straight seasons, including trips to the College World Series in 1979 and 1982, with the Titans winning the national championship in the 1979 season. During his time at Fullerton, he coached 14 pitchers who were selected by Major League Baseball in the amateur draft, four of whom reached the big leagues in Gary Buckles, Larry Casian, Jeff Robinson, and No. 1 draft pick Mike Harkey.

Following his father's death, Kernen left the Titans after the 1982 season to manage his family's business and returned to Cal State Fullerton for the 1987 season. In 1988, Kernen followed Garrido to Illinois.

=== Cal State Northridge (1989–1995) ===
Kernen's first major college head coaching position was at Cal State Northridge, where he led the Matadors from 1989 to 1995 in their transition from Division II to Division I. The Matadors, who had been successful at the Division II level, having won national titles in 1970 and 1984, transitioned to Division I under Kernen's auspices. 1990 was the last year of Division II play for the Matadors, and in this final year Kernen guided the team to the NCAA Division II College World Series title game. This effort earned Kernen the Division II West Region Coach of the Year honors.

In 1991, the first year of Division I play for the Matadors, Kernen led CSUN to a 44–18–1 record, the West Regional championship game and a #10 ranking in the final NCAA Division I poll, only the second time in NCAA baseball history a first year team finished in the Top 10, the other being Augie Garrido's Cal State Fullerton team in 1975. In seven seasons with the Matadors, Kernen's record was 240–154–3. In August 1995, Kernen resigned from Cal State Northridge to pursue a career in theater in New York City. He studied dramatic writing at Columbia University in 1995 and 1996.

At Cal State Northridge, several future college head coaches worked under Kernen. Rick Vanderhook, who was an assistant coach from 1989 to 1990, has been head coach at Cal State Fullerton since 2012. Jody Robinson, an assistant on the 1991 team, was head coach at Loyola Marymount from 1992 to 1996. Following one season on staff in 1992, Stan Sanchez has been head coach at Southern Colorado (now CSU–Pueblo) since 1993. Mike Batesole, an assistant from 1994 to 1995, was head coach at Cal State Fullerton from 1996 to 2002 and has been head coach at Fresno State since 2003.

=== NC State and Cal State Fullerton assistant (2002–2007) ===
Kernen returned to coaching in the 2002 season, hired in September 2001 as pitching coach at NC State under Elliott Avent. He left a week before the 2003 season.

In 2007, Kernen returned to Cal State Fullerton, this time as a volunteer assistant coach on a team that made the College World Series.

=== Cal State Bakersfield (2009–2015) ===
Cal State Bakersfield hired Kernen to be its inaugural baseball head coach in May 2007. He put together a roster of 25 for the program's debut season in 2008 entirely from freshmen and junior college transfers.

In its debut season of 2009, Cal State Bakersfield defeated defending College World Series champions Fresno State three out of five times to become the first-ever first-year Division I baseball team to defeat a defending national champion.

On March 7, 2011, Cal State Bakersfield received its first ever national ranking, at no. 30 on the Collegiate Baseball poll.

After four seasons as a Division I independent, Cal State Bakersfield joined the Western Athletic Conference (WAC) beginning in the 2013 season and won the regular season title that year, for which Kernen won WAC Coach of the Year honors.

On May 8, 2014, Kernen announced that he would retire after the season. Kernen reversed course three weeks later and decided to remain as head coach on a year-by-year basis. In his final season as head coach, Cal State Bakersfield made the NCAA tournament and won the WAC tournament title for the first time in program history. Cal State Bakersfield went 1–2 in the tournament, including a 2-1 win that eliminated 2014 College World Series participant Ole Miss from the tournament. On August 31, 2015, Cal State Bakersfield promoted assistant coach Bob Macaluso to be head coach. Macaluso went 19–37 in his only season as head coach before being fired in December 2016.

During Kernen's seven seasons, Cal State Bakersfield went 197–198–1 and produced 15 players selected in the Major League Baseball draft.

== Head coaching record ==
Below is a table of Kernen's yearly records as an NCAA head baseball coach.

Record table
Season	Team	Overall	Conference	Standing	Postseason
Cal State Northridge Matadors (California Collegiate Athletic Association) (1989–1990)
1989	Cal State Northridge	30–19–1	16–12–1	2nd	
1990	Cal State Northridge	39–22	21–9	T–1st	NCAA D-II Runners-up
Cal State Northridge Matadors (NCAA Division I independent) (1991–1992)
1991	Cal State Northridge	44–18–1			NCAA Regional
1992	Cal State Northridge	38–16–1			NCAA Regional
Cal State Northridge Matadors (Western Athletic Conference) (1993–1995)
1993	Cal State Northridge	36–20	13–11	T–2nd (West)	NCAA Regional
1994	Cal State Northridge	25–30	12–12	3rd (West)	
1995	Cal State Northridge	28–29	14–15	3rd (West)	
Cal State Northridge:		240–154–3 (.608)	76–59–1 (.563)		
Cal State Bakersfield Roadrunners (NCAA Division I independent) (2009–2012)
2009	Cal State Bakersfield	13–37			
2010	Cal State Bakersfield	26–30			
2011	Cal State Bakersfield	33–22			
2012	Cal State Bakersfield	25–30			
Cal State Bakersfield Roadrunners (Western Athletic Conference) (2013–2015)
2013	Cal State Bakersfield	37–22	18–9	T–1st	
2014	Cal State Bakersfield	26–33	15–12	5th	
2015	Cal State Bakersfield	37–24–1	17–9–1	3rd	NCAA Regional
Cal State Bakersfield:		197–198–1 (.499)	50–30–1 (.623)		
Total:		437–352–4 (.554)			
National champion Postseason invitational champion Conference regular season champion Conference regular season and conference tournament champion Division regular season champion Division regular season and conference tournament champion Conference tournament champion

== Theatre career ==
After coaching at Cal State Northridge, Kernen left college baseball to pursue a career in theatre and film.

== See also ==
- List of current NCAA Division I baseball coaches
