= Mesa Solar Sox =

Professional baseball team

- Founded in 1992; Mesa, Arizona

Minor league affiliations
- Class: Class A to Triple-A
- League: Arizona Fall League (1992–present)
- Division: East Division (2009–present)

Major league affiliations
- Teams: Athletics; Boston Red Sox; Chicago Cubs; Los Angeles Angels; Toronto Blue Jays

Minor league titles
- League titles (6): 1992; 1998; 1999; 2003; 2016; 2021
- Division titles (10): 1992; 1995; 1998; 1999; 2003; 2008; 2013; 2016; 2017; 2021

Team data
- Name: Mesa Solar Sox (1999–present)
- Previous names: Sun Cities Solar Sox (1992–1998)
- Ballpark: Sloan Park (2014–present)
- Previous parks: HoHoKam Stadium (1999–2013); Peoria Sports Complex (1994–1998); Sun City Stadium (1992–1993)
- Manager: James Cooper

The Mesa Solar Sox are a baseball team that plays in the East Division of the Arizona Fall League. They play their home games in Mesa, Arizona, at Sloan Park, which is also the spring training facility of the Chicago Cubs. The team was established in 1992 as the Sun Cities Solar Sox, and played for seven seasons under that name. The Solar Sox have won six league championships, most recently in 2021.

== Notable alumni ==
- Skye Bolt, outfielder for the Oakland A's
- Kris Bryant, former third baseman for the Chicago Cubs
- Drew Carpenter, former pitcher for the Toronto Blue Jays
- Jermaine Dye, former outfielder for the Oakland Athletics and Chicago White Sox
- Scott Effross, pitcher for the Chicago Cubs and New York Yankees
- Sam Fuld, outfielder for the Chicago Cubs, Tampa Bay Rays, Oakland Athletics, and Minnesota Twins
- L.J. Hoes, outfielder for the Houston Astros
- Spencer Horwitz, first baseman for the Toronto Blue Jays
- Ryan Kalish, former outfielder for the Boston Red Sox and Chicago Cubs
- Paul Konerko, former first baseman and designated hitter for the Chicago White Sox
- Derrek Lee, former first baseman for the Chicago Cubs and Baltimore Orioles
- Joc Pederson, outfielder for the Los Angeles Dodgers, Chicago Cubs, Atlanta Braves, and San Francisco Giants
- Mike Piazza, MLB Hall of Famer and former catcher for the New York Mets and Los Angeles Dodgers
- Cody Ross, former outfielder for the Arizona Diamondbacks
- Josh Satin, second baseman for the New York Mets
- Kyle Schwarber, outfielder for the Chicago Cubs and Washington Nationals
- Josh Zeid, pitcher for the Houston Astros
- Yordan Alvarez, designated hitter for the Houston Astros

== Roster ==
Mesa Solar Sox roster
Players		Coaches/Other
Pitchers: 14 Brandon Barriera (TOR); 30 Gilberto Batista (TOR); 50 Jake Bloss (TOR); 29 Harry Blum (BOS); 1 Jhon Cabral (CHC); 23 Jay Dill (ATH); 35 Madinson Frias (BOS); 97 Anhuar Garcia (CHC); 57 Yoendris Gonzalez (CHC); 69 Kenya Huggins (ATH); 49 Jared Johnson (ATH); 55 Nicholas Judice (BOS); 27 Jake Knapp (CHC); 33 Tucker Novotny (ATH); 51 Trennor O'Donnell (BOS); 28 Peyton Olejnik (LAA); 34 Fernando Perez (TOR); 11 Dominick Reid (CHC); 26 Grant Richardson (ATH); 12 Kyle Robinson (LAA); 56 Yondrei Rojas (TOR); 22 Sam Tookoian (LAA); 88 Yeferson Vargas (LAA); 7 Njaer Victor (LAA); 39 Caden Vire (BOS)	Catchers: 3 Cole Conn (ATH); 8 Davis Diaz (ATH); 20 Aaron Parker (TOR); Infielders: 10 Antonio Anderson (BOS); 21 Myles Bailey (CHC); 16 Juan Cabada (CHC); 2 Jake Munroe (LAA); 78 Arjun Nimmala (LAA); 2 Mason White (BOS); 17 Ryland Zaborowski (LAA); 24 Nazzan Zanetello (BOS); Outfielders: 4 Jake Casey (TOR); 9 Jake Cook (TOR); -- Breyson Guedez (ATH); 6 Kade Snell (CHC)	Manager: -- Daniel Wasinger; Coaches: 7-day injured list; ~ Development list; # Rehab assignment; ∞ Reserve list; ‡ Restricted list; § Suspended list; † Temporarily inactive list; Roster updated September 15, 2026; → More rosters: MiLB • Arizona Fall League

== See also ==
- Arizona Fall League#Results by season
