= 2017 Western Athletic Conference baseball tournament =

- Teams: 6
- Format: Double-elimination
- Finals site: Hohokam Stadium; Mesa, Arizona
- Champions: Sacramento State (2nd title)
- MVP: Justin Dillon (Sacramento State)

2017 Western Athletic Conference baseball standings
	Conf.						Overall
Team	W		L		T	PCT	W		L		T	PCT
Grand Canyon* ‍†‍‍	20	–	4	–	0	.833	29	–	25	–	0	.537
New Mexico State ‍‍‍	19	–	5	–	0	.792	35	–	22	–	0	.614
Cal State Bakersfield ‍‍‍	14	–	10	–	0	.583	31	–	24	–	0	.564
Sacramento State ‍‍‡‍^{y}	12	–	12	–	0	.500	32	–	29	–	0	.525
Utah Valley ‍‍‍	11	–	13	–	0	.458	18	–	36	–	0	.333
Northern Colorado ‍‍‍	10	–	14	–	0	.417	24	–	30	–	0	.444
Seattle ‍‍‍	8	–	16	–	0	.333	20	–	35	–	1	.366
Texas–Rio Grande Valley ‍‍‍	7	–	17	–	0	.292	26	–	28	–	0	.481
Chicago State ‍‍‍	7	–	17	–	0	.292	11	–	41	–	0	.212
† – Conference champion ‡ – Tournament champion y – Invited to the NCAA tournament * Ineligible for league and NCAA tournaments due to transition from Division II; Rankings from Collegiate Baseball

The 2017 Western Athletic Conference baseball tournament was a postseason baseball tournament for the Western Athletic Conference for the 2017–18 season. It began on May 24 and ended on May 27. The top six regular season finishers of the league's ten teams met in the double-elimination tournament held at Hohokam Stadium, spring training home of the Oakland Athletics in Mesa, Arizona. The winner earned the Western Athletic Conference's automatic bid to the 2017 NCAA Division I baseball tournament.

== Seeding and format ==
The top six finishers from the regular season will be seeded based on conference winning percentage. Grand Canyon is ineligible for the tournament due to their transition from Division II.

== Bracket ==
Upper round 1	Upper round 2	Upper final	Final
1	New Mexico State	4
4	Utah Valley	4	5	Northern Colorado	5
5	Northern Colorado	6	5	Northern Colorado	1
3	Sacramento State	10
2	CSU Bakersfield	6
3	Sacramento State	11	3	Sacramento State	10
6	Seattle	1
3	Sacramento State	5	-
2	CSU Bakersfield	0	-
Lower round 1	Lower round 2	Lower round 3	Lower final
2	CSU Bakersfield	8
2	CSU Bakersfield	11	5	Northern Colorado	5
6	Seattle	4	1	New Mexico State	7
4	Utah Valley	9	2	CSU Bakersfield	10
6	Seattle	11
