= 2012 Western Athletic Conference baseball tournament =

American Baseball Championship

- 2012 WAC baseball tournament logo
- Teams: 6
- Format: Double-elimination
- Finals site: HoHoKam Stadium; Mesa, AZ
- Champions: Fresno State (6th title)
- MVP: Jordan Luplow (Fresno State)

2012 Western Athletic Conference baseball standings
	Conf.				Overall
Team	W		L	PCT	W		L	PCT
New Mexico State ‍†‍‍^{y}	11	–	7	.611	35	–	22	.614
Nevada ‍‍‍	11	–	7	.611	32	–	25	.561
Sacramento State ‍‍‍	11	–	7	.611	31	–	26	.544
Hawaii ‍‍‍	10	–	8	.556	30	–	25	.545
Fresno State ‍‍‡‍^{y}	8	–	10	.444	28	–	26	.519
Louisiana Tech ‍‍‍	7	–	11	.389	27	–	28	.491
San Jose State ‍‍‍	5	–	13	.278	22	–	29	.431
† – Conference champion ‡ – Tournament champion y – Invited to the NCAA tournament As of May 26, 2012; Rankings from Collegiate Baseball

The 2012 Western Athletic Conference baseball tournament began on May 23 and ended on May 26 or 27. The top six regular season finishers of the league's seven teams met in the double-elimination tournament held at HoHoKam Stadium in Mesa, AZ. Fifth seeded Fresno State won their sixth and final tournament championship and claimed the Western Athletic Conference's automatic bid to the 2012 NCAA Division I baseball tournament. The Bulldogs joined the Mountain West Conference after the 2012 season.

== Seeding and format ==
The top six finishers from the regular season were seeded one through six. The bottom four seeds played on the first day, with the losers of each game playing an elimination game in game 3. On day 2, the winners of games 1 and 2 played the top two seeds. Higher seeds were protected by playing lower seeds or playing later elimination games.

Team	W	L	PCT	GB	Seed
New Mexico State	11	7	.611	–	1
Sacramento State	11	7	.611	–	2
Nevada	11	7	.611	–	3
Hawaii	10	8	.556	1	4
Fresno State	8	10	.444	2.5	5
Louisiana Tech	7	11	.389	4	6
San Jose State	5	13	.278	6	–

== Results ==
Upper round 1	Upper round 2	Upper final	Final
5	Fresno State	15
5	Fresno State	8	1	New Mexico State	8
4	Hawaii	2	2	Sacramento State	8
5	Fresno State	3
3	Nevada	5
6	Louisiana Tech	3	2	Sacramento State	15
3	Nevada	4
5	Fresno State	9	4*
2	Sacramento State	6	3*
Lower round 1	Lower round 2	Lower round 3	Lower final
6	Louisiana Tech	4
3	Nevada	5	5	Fresno State	6
6	Louisiana Tech	15	6	Louisiana Tech	18
4	Hawaii	6	1	New Mexico State	12
6	Louisiana Tech	9

* - Indicates game required 13 innings.

== Conference championship ==
WAC Championship
(2) Sacramento State Hornets	vs.	(5) Fresno State Bulldogs

May 26, 2012, 6:00 p.m. (MDT) at Hohokam Stadium in Mesa, Arizona
Team	1	2	3	4	5	6	7	8	9	R	H	E
(5) Fresno State	0	2	0	1	1	1	4	2	0	9	9	4
(2) Sacramento State	0	1	2	0	0	2	0	0	1	6	13	2
WP: Gene Escat (3–0) LP: Tyler Hoelzen (3–2); Attendance: 668

May 27, 2012, 12:00 p.m. (MDT) at Hohokam Stadium in Mesa, Arizona
Team	1	2	3	4	5	6	7	8	9	10	11	12	13	R	H	E
(2) Sacramento State	1	0	1	1	0	0	0	1	0	0	0	0	0	3	14	0
(5) Fresno State	0	0	0	0	0	0	3	0	0	0	0	0	1	4	5	0
WP: JD Salles (2–1) LP: R.J. Davis (1–2); Attendance: 584

== All-Tournament Team ==
The following players were named to the All-Tournament Team.

Name	School
Brent Hottman	Sacramento State
Austin Wynns	Fresno State
Alex Williams	Louisiana Tech
Derrick Chung	Sacramento State
Tanner Rust	New Mexico State
Trent Garrison	Fresno State
David Del Grande	Sacramento State
Aaron Judge	Fresno State
Jordan Luplow	Fresno State
Dallas Chadwick	Sacramento State
Thomas Harlan	Fresno State

=== Most Valuable Player ===
Jordan Luplow was named Tournament Most Valuable Player. Luplow was a right fielder for Fresno State.
