= Hardt Field =

Baseball stadium in Bakersfield, California, US

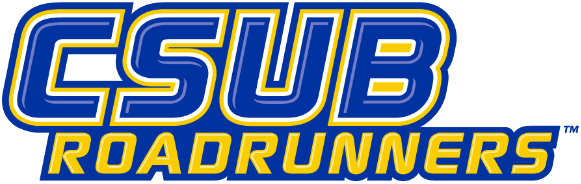

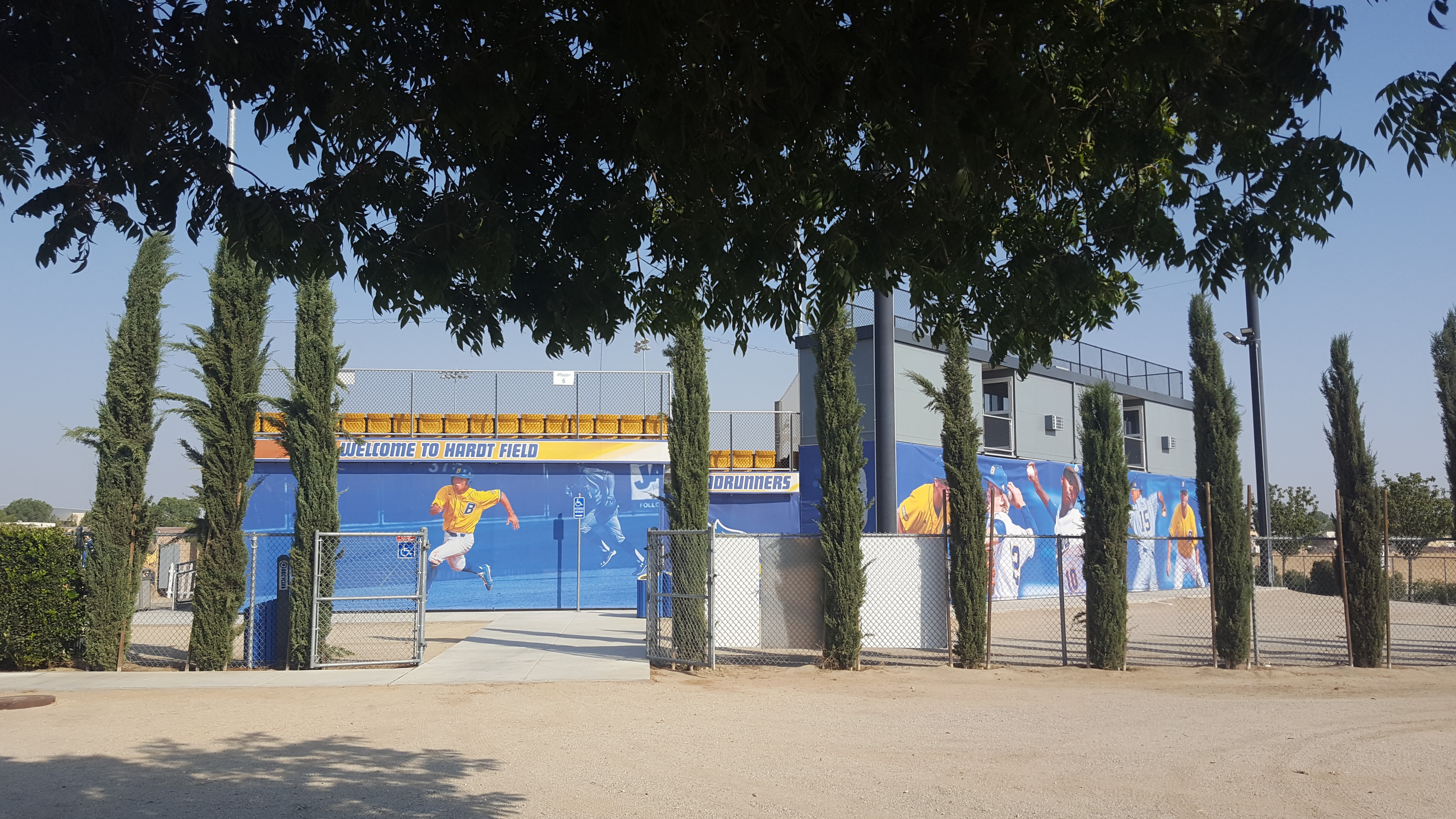
- Exterior view of the venue in 2017
- Interactive map of Hardt Field
- Address: Bakersfield, CA; United States
- Coordinates: 35.3469°N 119.1069°W
- Owner: Cal State University, Bakersfield
- Operator: Cal State Univ., Bakersfield Athletics
- Capacity: 900
- Type: Ballpark
- Surface: Natural grass (Hybrid Bermuda)
- Field size: List: Left field: 327 feet (100 m) Left center field: 370 feet (110 m) Center field: 390 feet (120 m) Right center field: 370 feet (110 m) Right field: 327 feet (100 m)
- Current use: Baseball

Construction
- Groundbreaking: August 11, 2008
- Opened: February 20, 2009; 17 years ago
- Cost: $2 million
- Architect: Colombo Construction Co.

Tenant
- Cal State Bakersfield Roadrunners baseball (NCAA (2009–present)

Website
- gorunners.com/hart-field

Hardt Field, also known in development as the Roadrunner Baseball Complex, is a baseball venue in Bakersfield, California, United States. It is the home field of the Cal State Bakersfield Roadrunners baseball team. The stadium is located in the south-west section of the campus of Cal State Bakersfield.

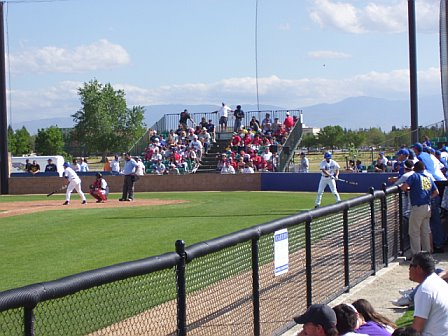
Hardt Field, Home Field of the CSUB Roadrunners

The stadium was named for Tom and Barbara Hardt. The Hardt Family Trust's $1 million gift and donation of general contracting work supported the construction of the on-campus baseball training and playing facility.

The first game played in Hardt Field was the inaugural game for the Cal State Bakersfield baseball team on February 20, 2009, between CSUB and Saint Louis, with the Billikens beating the Roadrunners 8–7 before a sold-out crowd. Highlights from the inaugural (2009) season included a walk-off win in the 15th inning over UC Riverside. Also during the 2009 season, Hardt Field was the site of the first time that an NCAA Division I first-year program had defeated the reigning College World Series champion, when the Roadrunners beat Fresno State 4–3.

Prior to the start of the 2013 season, 750 chairbacked seats were added at the field.

== Gallery ==
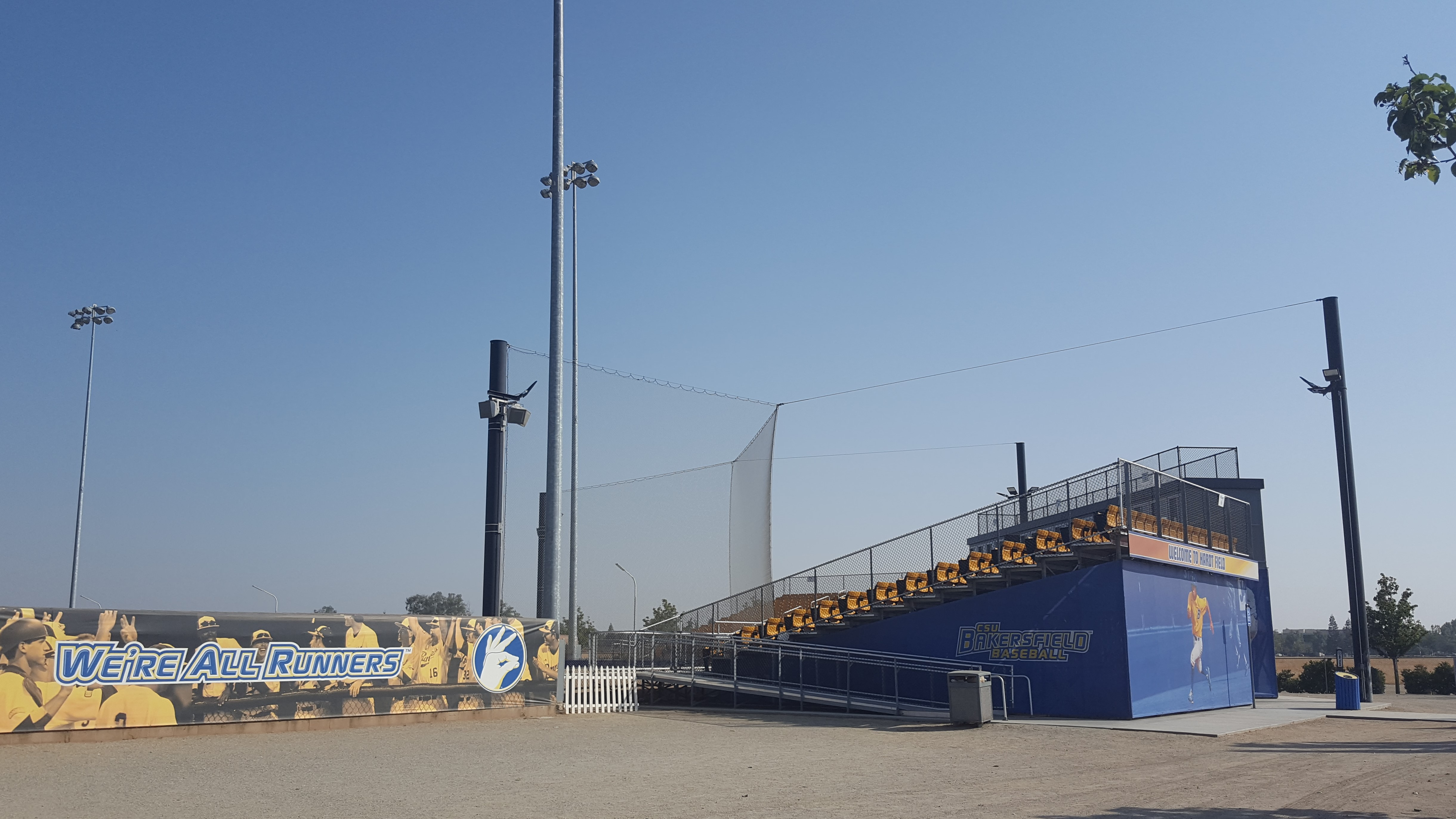
Hardt Field grandstand

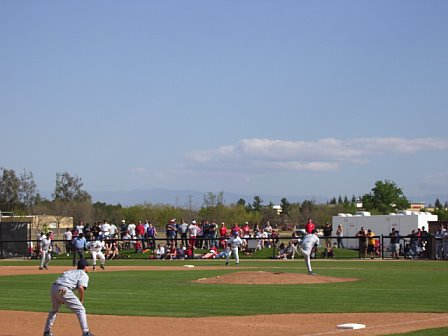
Hardt Field on game day

== See also ==
- List of NCAA Division I baseball venues
