= 2015 Western Athletic Conference baseball tournament =

- Teams: 6
- Format: Double-elimination
- Finals site: Sloan Park; Mesa, AZ
- Champions: Cal State Bakersfield (1st title)
- Television: WAC Digital Network

2015 Western Athletic Conference baseball standings
	Conf.						Overall
Team	W		L		T	PCT	W		L		T	PCT
Grand Canyon† ‍‍‍	19	–	7	–	0	.731	32	–	22	–	0	.593
Seattle ‍‍‍	19	–	8	–	0	.704	31	–	27	–	0	.534
Cal State Bakersfield ‍‍‍	17	–	9	–	1	.648	37	–	24	–	1	.605
Sacramento State ‍‍‍	16	–	11	–	0	.593	33	–	27	–	0	.550
North Dakota ‍‍‍	16	–	11	–	0	.593	24	–	27	–	0	.471
Utah Valley ‍‍‍	14	–	13	–	0	.519	19	–	35	–	0	.352
Northern Colorado ‍‍‍	12	–	15	–	0	.444	16	–	32	–	0	.333
New Mexico State ‍‍‍	7	–	19	–	1	.278	11	–	38	–	1	.230
Chicago State ‍‍‍	6	–	19	–	1	.250	13	–	40	–	1	.250
Texas–Pan American ‍‍‍	6	–	20	–	1	.241	21	–	30	–	1	.413
‡ – Tournament champion † Ineligible for league and NCAA tournaments due to transition from Division II; As of May 4, 2015; Rankings from Collegiate Baseball

The 2015 Western Athletic Conference baseball tournament will take place beginning on May 20 and ending on May 24. The top six regular season finishers of the league's ten teams will meet in the double-elimination tournament to be held at Sloan Park, spring training home of the Chicago Cubs in Mesa, Arizona. The winner will earn the Western Athletic Conference's automatic bid to the 2015 NCAA Division I baseball tournament.

== Seeding and format ==
The top six finishers from the regular season were seeded based on conference winning percentage. Grand Canyon was ineligible for the tournament due to their transition from Division II.

Team	W	L	T	Pct	GB	Seed	Tiebreaker
Grand Canyon	19	7	0	.731	–	–	
Seattle	19	8	0	.704	0.5	1	
Cal State Bakersfield	17	9	1	.648	2	2	
North Dakota	16	11	0	.593	3.5	3	2–1 vs. Sacramento State
Sacramento State	16	11	0	.593	3.5	4	1–2 vs. North Dakota
Utah Valley	15	12	0	.556	5.5	5	
Northern Colorado	12	15	0	.444	7.5	6	
New Mexico State	7	19	1	.278	12	–	
Chicago State	6	19	1	.250	12.5	–	
Texas–Pan American	5	21	1	.204	13	–	

== Bracket ==
- All games will be broadcast on the WAC Digital Network. Corey Costelloe will call the action Thursday. Michael Potter will call the action Friday through the championship. Erin Slack will act as the reporter for all games.

Upper round 1	Upper round 2	Upper final	Final
1	Seattle	7
4	Sacramento State	2	5	Utah Valley	1
5	Utah Valley	3^{(10)}	1	Seattle	9
2	Cal State Bakersfield	3
2	Cal State Bakersfield	11
3	North Dakota	7	3	North Dakota	1^{(7)}
6	Northern Colorado	2
1	Seattle	5	4
2	Cal State Bakersfield	6^{(10)}	5
Lower round 1	Lower round 2	Lower round 3	Lower final
4	Sacramento State	0
4	Sacramento State	10	2	Cal State Bakersfield	4
4	Sacramento State	9	3	North Dakota	2
4	Sacramento State	5	5	Utah Valley	3
6	Northern Colorado	0
