= 2009 Savannah State Tigers baseball team =

American college baseball season

2009 Savannah State Tigers baseball
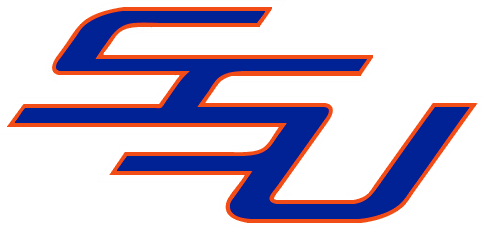
- Conference: Independent
- Record: 25-26
- Head coach: Carlton Hardy (4th season)
- Assistant coach: Emanuel Wheeler (4th season)

2009 NCAA Division I baseball independents standings
	Conf.				Overall
Team	W		L	PCT	W		L	PCT
Dallas Baptist ‍‍‍	38	–	17	.691	0	–	0	–
Bryant ‍‍‍	32	–	22	.593	0	–	0	–
Longwood ‍‍‍	26	–	22	.542	0	–	0	–
Le Moyne ‍‍‍	24	–	23	.511	0	–	0	–
Savannah State ‍‍‍	25	–	26	.490	0	–	0	–
NYIT ‍‍‍	19	–	29	.396	0	–	0	–
Northern Colorado ‍‍‍	18	–	35	.340	0	–	0	–
Utah Valley ‍‍‍	18	–	35	.340	0	–	0	–
North Dakota ‍‍‍	14	–	29	.326	0	–	0	–
SIU Edwardsville ‍‍‍	15	–	39	.278	0	–	0	–
Cal State Bakersfield ‍‍‍	13	–	37	.260	0	–	0	–
Texas–Pan American ‍‍‍	14	–	41	.255	0	–	0	–
Houston Baptist ‍‍‍	11	–	40	.216	0	–	0	–
North Carolina Central ‍‍‍	6	–	35	.146	0	–	0	–
NJIT ‍‍‍	4	–	33	.108	0	–	0	–
Chicago State ‍‍‍	3	–	38	.073	0	–	0	–
As of June 30, 2009; Rankings from Collegiate Baseball

The 2009 Savannah State Tigers baseball team represented Savannah State University in the NCAA Division I baseball season of 2009. They played their home games at Tiger Field and Grayson Stadium in Savannah, Georgia. The team was coached by Carlton Hardy who was in his fourth season at Savannah State. In 2009, the team led Division I in stolen bases (169 in 207 attempts) and in stolen bases per game (3.31).

== Roster ==
=== Coaches ===
Name	Title	First season at Savannah State	Alma mater
Carlton Hardy	Head coach	2006	Grambling State University
Emanuel Wheeler	Assistant coach	2006	Chicago State University
James "Trey" Mock	Assistant coach		

=== Players ===
No.	Player	Position	Ht/Wt	Year	Hometown (Last School)
1	Darien Cambell	2nd Base	5-7 150	Fr.	Collegeville, SC / Colleton County
2	Bryce Stokes	Right Hand Pitcher	5-7 145	Fr.	Lithonia, Ga. / Redan
3	Kendrick Jones	Outfield	5-9 160	Fr.	Hinesville, Ga. / Liberty
4	Jarrel Arnold	Right Hand Pitcher	5-9 155	Jr.	College Park, Ga. / Fayette County
5	Julius Green	Short Stop	6-0 180	Fr.	Pooler, Ga. / Calvary Day
6	Matthew Oglesby	Short Stop / Pitcher	5-10 170	So.	Savannah, Ga. / HV Jenkins
7	Brett Pointer	Outfield	6-0 175	Jr.	Newnan, Ga. / Northgate
8	Tristan Smith	2nd Base	5-9 165	Sr.	Stone Mountain, Ga. / Stephenson
9	Shawn Gallagher	Right Hand Pitcher / 3rd Base	5-10 190	Fr.	McDonough, Ga. / Henry County
10	David Washington	Outfield	5-7 165	Sr.	Bronx, N.Y. / Chamblee
11	Dychal Bowles	3rd Base	6-1 195	Fr.	Snellville, Ga. / Shiloh
12	Dexter Kelley	Outfield	6-1 180	So.	Atlanta, Ga. / North Atlanta
14	Brandon Webster	1st Base / 3rd Base	6-2 185	So.	Darien, Ga. / McIntosh Academy
15	Chris Lawlor	Right Hand Pitcher	5-9 165	Fr. S	Savannah, Ga. / HV Jenkins
16	Matthew Nowacki	1st Base	5-10 170	So.	McDonough, Ga. / Henry County
17	Robert Ramsdale	Left Hand Pitcher	5-11 155	Sr.	Dorchester, ONT / Lord Dorchester
18	Mark Sherrod	Right Hand Pitcher	6-0 205	Jr.	Jackson, Mi. / Jackson
19	Courtrevez McTier	Left Hand Pitcher	6-3 185	So.	Riverdale, Ga. / Riverdale
21	Dondregius Jackson	Outfield	6-4 205	Jr.	Pamplico, SC / Hannah-Pamplico
22	Shane Matthews	Right Hand Pitcher	6-3 190	Fr.	Locust Grove, Ga. / Ola
23	Johnathan Ross	Outfield / 1st Base	5-11 190	Jr.	Macon, Ga. / Jones County
24	Andrew Mendez	Catcher	5-10 180	Sr.	Miami, Fl. / St. Brendan
26	Eric Ransom	Right Hand Pitcher	6-1 195	Fr.	Savannah, Ga. / McIntosh Academy
27	Arney Roberson	Catcher	6-1 190	Jr.	Atlanta, Ga. / Westlake
30	Jordan Monico	Outfield	5-11 221	Fr.	Miliani, Hi. / Moanalua
31	Michael Allegretti	Right Hand Pitcher	6-0 160	So.	Savannah, Ga. / Calvary Day
34	Joseph Jackson	Right Hand Pitcher	6-7 260	So.	San Pablo, Ca. / De Anza

== Schedule ==
#	Date	Opponent	Score	Win	Loss	Save	Attendance	Record	Box/ Streak
1	February 20, 2009	North Carolina Central	7-6	Allegretti (1-0)	Jordan (0-1)	Ransom (1)	200	1-0	{{{box/streak}}}
2	February 21, 2009	North Carolina Central	10-3	Ramsdale (1-0)	Dalley (0-1)		175	2-0	{{{box/streak}}}
3	February 22, 2009	Norfolk State	14-6	Davenport (1-0)	Sherrod (0-1)		100	2-1	{{{box/streak}}}
4	February 22, 2009	Norfolk State	16-7	Ransom (1-0)	Barker (0-1)		100	3-1	{{{box/streak}}}
5	February 28, 2009	North Carolina A&T	2-5	McCraw	Allegretti	Braun	100	3-2	{{{box/streak}}}
6	February 28, 2009	North Carolina A&T	3-6	Paulino	Ramsdale	Braun	100	3-3	{{{box/streak}}}
7	March 1, 2009	North Carolina A&T	Cancelled						{{{box/streak}}}
8	March 3, 2009	South Carolina–Beaufort	15-6	Rhodes	Sherrod (1-1)		140	3-4	{{{box/streak}}}
9	March 4, 2009	@ Morehouse	7-3	Arnold (1-0)	Mills		120	4-4	{{{box/streak}}}
10	March 4, 2009	@ Morehouse	4-3	Wright	Oglesby		120	4-5	{{{box/streak}}}
11	March 7, 2009	@ North Carolina Central	9-6	Citero (1-1)	Allegretti (1-2)	Strickland (1)	209	4-6	{{{box/streak}}}
12	March 7, 2009	@ North Carolina Central	3-2	Oatis (1-0)	Ramsdale (1-1)		187	4-7	{{{box/streak}}}
13	March 8, 2009	@ North Carolina Central	21-7	Mathews (1-0)	Cobb (0-1)		95	5-7	{{{box/streak}}}
14	March 10, 2009	Charleston Southern	7-5	Roberts (1-0)	Oglesby (0-2)		130	5-8	{{{box/streak}}}
15	March 11, 2009	South Carolina Beaufort	12-9	Philpott	Arnold		130	5-9	{{{box/streak}}}
16	March 14, 2009	@ Delaware State	2-1	Ramsdale (2-1)	Perkins (0-2)			6-9	{{{box/streak}}}
17	March 14, 2009	@ Delaware State	3-0	Allegretti (2-2)	Schmidt (2-2)		25	7-9	{{{box/streak}}}
18	March 15, 2009	@ Delaware State	15-9	Bittner (1-0)	Ransom		20	7-10	{{{box/streak}}}
19	March 17, 2009	@ Georgia State	7-11	Squegila	Mathews		134	7-11	{{{box/streak}}}
20	March 18, 2009	Morehouse	18-2	Jackson (1-0)	Mills (10)		150	8-11	{{{box/streak}}}
21	March 18, 2009	Morehouse	8-3	Oglesby (1-1)	McGowan (21)		136	9-11	{{{box/streak}}}
22	March 21, 2009	North Carolina Central	5-3	Ramsdale (2-1)	Citero		75	10-11	{{{box/streak}}}
23	March 21, 2009	North Carolina Central	6-4	Allegretti (2-2)	Rennard		75	11-11	{{{box/streak}}}
24	March 22, 2009	North Carolina Central	12-1	Ransom (2-2)	Oatis		70	12-11	{{{box/streak}}}
25	March 24, 2009	Mercer	5-1	Arnold (1-1)	April (1-2)	Ransom (2)	120	13-11	{{{box/streak}}}
26	March 25, 2009	Air Force	4-1	Allegretti (4-2)	Abrecht (0-2)		150	14-11	{{{box/streak}}}
27	March 27, 2009	@ UAB	11-5	Crawford (3-2)	Ramsdale (3-2)		342	14-12	{{{box/streak}}}
28	March 28, 2009	@ UAB	20-2	Roberson (4-2)	Ransom (2-3)		307	14-13	{{{box/streak}}}
29	March 29, 2009	@ UAB	8-3	Graffeo (1-1)	Allegretti (4-3)		381	14-14	{{{box/streak}}}
30	April 1, 2009	@ Benedict	10-8	Ransom (3-3)	Smalls (0-1)		55	15-14	{{{box/streak}}}
31	April 4, 2009	Campbell	12-10	Davis (5-0)	Jackson (1-1)		203	15-15	{{{box/streak}}}
32	April 4, 2009	Campbell	18-1	Ford (2-1)	Ramsdale (3-3)		245	15-16	{{{box/streak}}}
33	April 8, 2009	@ South Carolina–Beaufort	16-7	Arnold (3-1)	Crump (3-1)		130	16-16	{{{box/streak}}}
34	April 8, 2009	@ South Carolina–Beaufort	6-5	Ransom (4-3)	Graney (2-1)	Oglesby (1)	130	17-16	{{{box/streak}}}
35	April 10, 2009	Concordia (AL)	13-0	Allegretti (5-3)	Taylor		75	18-16	{{{box/streak}}}
36	April 10, 2009	Concordia (AL)	13-4	Jackson (2-1)	Murphy		75	19-16	{{{box/streak}}}
37	April 11, 2009	Concordia (AL)	18-0	Ramsdale (4-3)	Fisher		90	20-16	{{{box/streak}}}
38	April 13, 2009	Edward Waters	4-3	Oglesby (2-2)	Smith	Ransom	50	21-16	{{{box/streak}}}
39	April 14, 2009	@ The Citadel	6-2	Jackson (3-1)	Copenhaver (2-3)		935	22-16	{{{box/streak}}}
40	April 15, 2009	Claflin	17-3	McTier (1-0)	Thomas (3-3)		300	23-16	{{{box/streak}}}
41	April 18, 2009	@ North Carolina A&T	11-4	Paulino (4-3)	Allegretti		73	23-17	{{{box/streak}}}
42	April 18, 2009	@ North Carolina A&T	14-2	Boles (3-2)	Jackson (3-2)		78	23-18	{{{box/streak}}}
43	April 19, 2009	@ North Carolina A&T	12-5	Rogers (2-2)	Ramsdale (4-4)		75	23-19	{{{box/streak}}}
44	April 21, 2009	South Carolina–Beaufort	12-7	Wooten	Ransom		90	23-20	{{{box/streak}}}
45	April 22, 2009	@ Mercer	5-6	Odom (3-4)	Allegretti (5-5)		141	23-21	{{{box/streak}}}
46	April 25, 2009	@ Norfolk State	13-12	Shook (1-2)	Allegretti (5-6)		219	23-22	{{{box/streak}}}
47	April 25, 2009	@ Norfolk State	8-2	Davenport (4-4)	Allegretti (5-7)			23-23	{{{box/streak}}}
48	April 25, 2009	@ Norfolk State	10-11	Shook (2-2)	Oglesby (2-3)		123	23-24	{{{box/streak}}}
49	May 8, 2009	Albany State	8-0	Allegretti	Brown		70	24-24	{{{box/streak}}}
50	May 8, 2009	Albany State	4-2	Johnson	Ramsdale		70	24-25	{{{box/streak}}}
51	May 12, 2009	@ Charleston Southern	1-5					24-26	{{{box/streak}}}
52	May 12, 2009	@ Charleston Southern	6-5	Allegretti (7-7)	Thornburg (4-4)	Ramsdale (1)	132	25-26	{{{box/streak}}}

== Awards and honors ==
Player	Award/Honor	Reference
Courtrevez McTier	2009 Independent Baseball All-Academic Team	
Brandon Webster	2009 Independent Baseball All-Academic Team	

== See also ==
- Savannah State Tigers
