= 2016 Western Athletic Conference baseball tournament =

- Teams: 6
- Format: Double-elimination
- Finals site: Hohokam Stadium; Mesa, Arizona
- Champions: Utah Valley (1st title)

2016 Western Athletic Conference baseball standings
	Conf.						Overall
Team	W		L		T	PCT	W		L		T	PCT
Seattle ‍†‍‍	21	–	6	–	0	.778	37	–	21	–	0	.638
New Mexico State ‍‍‍	20	–	7	–	0	.741	34	–	23	–	0	.596
Utah Valley ‍‍‡‍^{y}	18	–	9	–	0	.667	37	–	23	–	0	.617
Sacramento State ‍‍‍	16	–	11	–	0	.593	30	–	28	–	0	.517
Grand Canyon * ‍‍‍	13	–	14	–	0	.481	25	–	28	–	1	.472
Northern Colorado ‍‍‍	11	–	12	–	0	.478	16	–	34	–	0	.320
Cal State Bakersfield ‍‍‍	12	–	14	–	0	.462	19	–	37	–	0	.339
Texas-Rio Grande Valley ‍‍‍	10	–	14	–	0	.417	21	–	28	–	0	.429
Chicago State ‍‍‍	6	–	21	–	0	.222	13	–	42	–	0	.236
North Dakota ‍‍‍	4	–	23	–	0	.148	8	–	37	–	0	.178
† – Conference champion ‡ – Tournament champion y – Invited to the NCAA tournament * - Ineligible for league and NCAA tournaments due to transition from Division II; As of May 23, 2016; Rankings from Collegiate Baseball

The 2016 Western Athletic Conference baseball tournament will take place beginning on May 25 and ending on May 28 or 29. The top six regular season finishers of the league's ten teams will meet in the double-elimination tournament to be held at Hohokam Stadium, spring training home of the Oakland Athletics in Mesa, Arizona. The winner will earn the Western Athletic Conference's automatic bid to the 2016 NCAA Division I baseball tournament.

== Seeding and format ==
The top six finishers from the regular season will be seeded based on conference winning percentage. Grand Canyon is ineligible for the tournament due to their transition from Division II.

== Bracket ==
Upper round 1	Upper round 2	Upper final	Final
1	Seattle	5
4	Sacramento State	8	4	Sacramento State	4
5	Northern Colorado	7	1	Seattle	8
3	Utah Valley	13
2	New Mexico State	2
3	Utah Valley	6	3	Utah Valley	3
6	Cal State Bakersfield	4
3	Utah Valley	4
1	Seattle	0
Lower round 1	Lower round 2	Lower round 3	Lower final
1	Seattle	12
4	Sacramento State	4	2	New Mexico State	10
6	CSU Bakersfield	6	2	New Mexico State	5
6	CSU Bakersfield	11	2	New Mexico State	11
5	Northern Colorado	6
