= Bob Macaluso =

American college baseball coach (born 1964)

Biographical details
- Born: April 16, 1964 (age 62); Reading, Massachusetts, U.S.

Playing career
- 1984–1987: Springfield
- Position: Infield

Coaching career (HC unless noted)
- 1989–1992: Melrose HS (asst.)
- 1993–1996: Weston HS
- 1997–1998: Springfield (asst.)
- 1999–2006: Muhlenberg
- 2007–2008: Cal State Los Angeles (asst.)
- 2009–2014: UC Irvine (asst.)
- 2015: Cal State Bakersfield (asst.)
- 2016: Cal State Bakersfield
- 2018–2019: Pacific (volunteer asst.)

Head coaching record
- Overall: 155–183–3 (.459)

Accomplishments and honors

Championships
- As assistant coach: Big West regular season (2009); WAC Tournament (2015)

Robert Peter Macaluso Jr. (born April 16, 1964) is an American college baseball coach who is currently an assistant coach at the University of the Pacific.

== Early life and education ==
Born in Reading, Massachusetts, Macaluso played college baseball at Springfield College and graduated in 1987 with a Bachelor of Science degree in physical education. He later completed a master's degree in physical education at Springfield in 1998.

== Coaching career ==
Macaluso was pitching coach at Melrose High School in Melrose, Massachusetts from 1989 to 1992 and head varsity coach at Weston High School in Weston, Massachusetts from 1993 to 1996. Macaluso also coached an American Legion Baseball team in Reading, Massachusetts from 1988 to 1997. Future major leaguer Jason Bere was among his players.

After two seasons back at Springfield as an assistant in 1997 and 1998, he became head coach at Muhlenberg for eight seasons. He then became an assistant for Cal State Los Angeles for two seasons, then UC Irvine for six seasons. While with the Anteaters, UC Irvine reached the 2014 College World Series. He then became an assistant at Cal State Bakersfield for one season before ascending to the top job.

From 2003 to 2008, Macaluso managed the Brewster Whitecaps, a collegiate summer baseball team in the prestigious Cape Cod Baseball League.

After he went 19–37 in his only season as head coach, Cal State Bakersfield fired Macaluso in December 2016.

In September 2017, Macaluso joined the staff of Ryan Garko at the University of the Pacific as a volunteer assistant coach.

== Head coaching record ==
Record table
Season	Team	Overall	Conference	Standing	Postseason
Muhlenberg Mules (Centennial Conference) (1999–2006)
1999	Muhlenberg	16–20	10–8	T–4th	
2000	Muhlenberg	14–23	9–9	5th	
2001	Muhlenberg	17–19	9–9	T–4th	
2002	Muhlenberg	23–17	11–7	4th	
2003	Muhlenberg	21–14–1	10–7–1	4th	
2004	Muhlenberg	12–18–1	6–11–1	8th	
2005	Muhlenberg	17–15	8–10	7th	
2006	Muhlenberg	15–20–1	8–9–1	5th	
Muhlenberg:		136–146–3 (.482)	71–70–3 (.503)		
Cal State Bakersfield Roadrunners (Western Athletic Conference) (2016)
2016	Cal State Bakersfield	19–37	12–14	7th	
Cal State Bakersfield:		19–37 (.339)	12–14 (.462)		
Total:		155–183–3 (.459)			
