= 2018 Western Athletic Conference baseball tournament =

- Teams: 6
- Format: Double-elimination
- Finals site: Hohokam Stadium; Mesa, Arizona
- Champions: New Mexico State
- Television: WAC DN

2018 Western Athletic Conference baseball standings
	Conf.				Overall
Team	W		L	PCT	W		L	PCT
Grand Canyon ‍‍‍	19	–	5	.792	33	–	22	.600
New Mexico State ‍‍‍	17	–	7	.708	36	–	19	.655
Sacramento State ‍‍‍	17	–	7	.708	31	–	23	.574
Seattle ‍‍‍	13	–	11	.542	32	–	21	.604
Northern Colorado ‍‍‍	11	–	13	.458	29	–	22	.569
Cal State Bakersfield ‍‍‍	10	–	14	.417	20	–	34	.370
Texas–Rio Grande Valley ‍‍‍	8	–	16	.333	23	–	31	.426
Chicago State ‍‍‍	7	–	17	.292	13	–	41	.241
Utah Valley ‍‍‍	6	–	18	.250	15	–	37	.288
‡ – Tournament champion As of May 20, 2018; Rankings from Collegiate Baseball

The 2018 Western Athletic Conference baseball tournament will take place beginning on May 23 and ending on May 26 or 27. The top six regular season finishers of the league's ten teams will meet in the double-elimination tournament to be held at Hohokam Stadium, spring training home of the Oakland Athletics in Mesa, Arizona. The winner will earn the Western Athletic Conference's automatic bid to the 2018 NCAA Division I baseball tournament.

== Seeding and format ==
The top six finishers from the regular season will be seeded based on conference winning percentage.

== Bracket ==
Upper round 1	Upper round 2	Upper final	Final
4	Seattle	3
4	Seattle U	8	1	Grand Canyon	2
5	Northern Colorado	5	4	Seattle	1
3	New Mexico State	11^{7}
3	New Mexico State	2
3	New Mexico State	4	2	Sacramento State	0
6	CSU Bakersfield	0
3	New Mexico State	3	4
2	Sacramento State	4_{15}	3
Lower round 1	Lower round 2	Lower round 3	Lower final
4	Seattle	7
1	Grand Canyon	2	2	Sacramento State	12
6	CSU Bakersfield	3	2	Sacramento State	8
5	Northern Colorado	0	2	Sacramento State	17^{7}
6	CSU Bakersfield	2
