= Cal State Bakersfield Roadrunners baseball =

California State University, Bakersfield

- 2026 Cal State Bakersfield Roadrunners baseball team
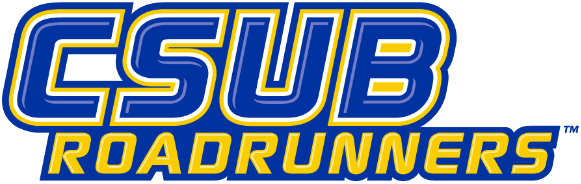
- Founded: 2009
- Overall record: 298–339–1
- University: California State University, Bakersfield
- Head coach: Jordon Banfield (2nd season)
- Conference: Big West Conference
- Location: Bakersfield, California
- Home stadium: Hardt Field (capacity: 900)
- Nickname: Roadrunners
- Colors: Blue and gold

NCAA tournament appearances
- 2015

Conference tournament champions
- 2015

Conference regular season champions
- 2013

The Cal State Bakersfield baseball team represents California State University, Bakersfield in the NCAA Division I college baseball. Cal State Bakersfield plays its home games on Hardt Field on the campus of California State University, Bakersfield in Bakersfield, California. The Roadrunners have played in one NCAA tournament. Over their eight seasons in the Western Athletic Conference, they have won one WAC regular season title and one WAC tournament. The Roadrunners compete in the Big West Conference and are led by head coach Jordon Banfield.

Since the program's inception in 2009, two Roadrunners have gone on to play in Major League Baseball, relief pitcher Austin Davis, and knuckleball pitcher Mickey Jannis. Over the program's 12 seasons, 20 Roadrunners have been drafted, including Darius Vines who was selected in the seventh round of the 2019.

== Conference membership history ==
- 2009–2012: Independent
- 2013–2020: Western Athletic Conference
- 2021–present: Big West Conference

== Hardt Field ==
Hardt Field is a baseball stadium on the California State University, Bakersfield campus in Bakersfield, California that seats 900 people. It was opened on February 20, 2009 in a 7–8 loss to Saint Louis.

== Head coaches ==
Records taken from the CSUB coaching records.

Season	Coach	Years	Record	Pct.
2009–2015	Bill Kernen	7	197–198–1	.499
2016	Bob Macaluso	1	19–37	.339
2017–2024	Jeremy Beard	8	153–246	.393
Totals	3 coaches	16 seasons	369–471–1	.439

== Year-by-year results ==
Records taken from the CSUB year-by-year results.

Record table
Season	Coach	Overall	Conference	Standing	Postseason
Independent (2009–2012)
2009	Bill Kernen	13–37			
2010	Bill Kernen	26–30			
2011	Bill Kernen	33–22			
2012	Bill Kernen	25–30			
Western Athletic Conference (2013–2020)
2013	Bill Kernen	37–22	18–9	T-1st	WAC tournament
2014	Bill Kernen	26–33	15–12	5th	WAC tournament
2015	Bill Kernen	37–24–1	17–9–1	3rd	WAC tournament Los Angeles Regional
2016	Bob Macaluso	19–37	12–14	7th	WAC tournament
2017	Jeremy Beard	32–24	14–10	3rd	WAC tournament
2018	Jeremy Beard	21–36	10–14	6th	WAC tournament
2019	Jeremy Beard	24–35	12–15	6th	WAC tournament
2020	Jeremy Beard	5–9			Season cancelled on March 18 due to Coronavirus pandemic
Big West Conference (2021–present)
2021	Jeremy Beard	20–23	17–19	7th	
2022	Jeremy Beard	18–34	11–19	9th	
2023	Jeremy Beard	18–34	9–21	9th	
2024	Jeremy Beard	15–38	8–22	9th	
Total:		369–481–1			
National champion Postseason invitational champion Conference regular season champion Conference regular season and conference tournament champion Division regular season champion Division regular season and conference tournament champion Conference tournament champion

== NCAA Division I tournament history ==
- The NCAA Division I baseball tournament started in 1947.
- The format of the tournament has changed through the years.
- Cal State Bakersfield began playing baseball in 2009.

Year	Record	Pct	Notes
2015	1–2	.333	Eliminated at 33rd by UCLA in Los Angeles Regional
Totals	1–2	.333	

Year	Round	Opponent	Result
2015	Los Angeles Regional	UCLA	L 2–7
2015	Los Angeles Regional	Ole Miss	W 2–1
2015	Los Angeles Regional	UCLA	L 1–9

== Awards and honors ==
- Over their 12 seasons in Division I, one Roadrunner has been named to an NCAA-recognized All-America team.
- Over their 8 seasons in the Western Athletic Conference, 13 different Roadrunners have been named to the all-conference first-team.

=== All-Americans ===
Year	Position	Name	Team	Selector
2013	SP	Jeff McKenzie	3rd	CB

=== Freshman First-Team All-Americans ===
Year	Position	Name	Selector
2011	2B	Oscar Sanay	CB
2013	3B	Mylz Jones	CB

=== Western Athletic Conference Coach of the Year ===
Year	Name
2013	Bill Kernen
2015	Bill Kernen

=== Western Athletic Conference Player of the Year ===
Year	Position	Name
2013	INF	Tyler Shyrock

=== Western Athletic Conference Pitcher of the Year ===
Year	Handedness	Name
2013	Left	Jeff McKenzie
2015	Right	Hayden Carter
2017	Right	Max Carter

Taken from CSUB baseball national recognition and conference recognition pages. Updated March 19, 2020.

== Roadrunners in the Major Leagues ==
= All-Star	= Baseball Hall of Famer

Athlete	Years in MLB	MLB teams
Austin Davis	2018–present	Philadelphia Phillies, Pittsburgh Pirates
Mickey Jannis	2021-present	Baltimore Orioles

Taken from Baseball Reference. Updated June 25, 2021.

== See also ==
- List of NCAA Division I baseball programs
