= Cal State Bakersfield Roadrunners =

Intercollegiate sports teams of California State University, Bakersfield

- University: CSU Bakersfield
- Nickname: Roadrunners
- NCAA: NCAA Division I
- Conference: Big West Conference (primary); Mountain Pacific Sports Federation (swimming & diving); Pac-12 (wrestling); Independent (women's indoor track & field)
- Athletic director: Andy Fiske
- Location: Bakersfield, California
- Varsity teams: 16 (6 men's, 10 women's)
- Basketball arena: Icardo Center (3,800)
- Baseball stadium: Hardt Field (2,000)
- Softball stadium: CSUB Softball Complex
- Soccer stadium: Main Soccer Field (2,000)
- Other venues: Barnes Beach Volleyball Complex; Hillman Memorial Aquatic Center; Mechanics Bank Arena
- Colors: Blue and gold
- Mascot: Rowdy the Roadrunner
- Website: gorunners.com
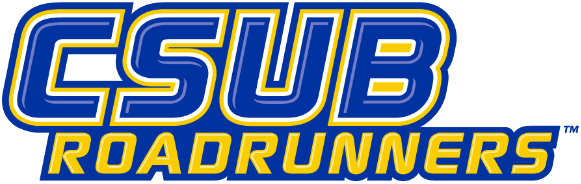

The Cal State Bakersfield Roadrunners (also known as CSUB Roadrunners, and now in the process of being rebranded as the Bakersfield Roadrunners) are the intercollegiate athletic teams representing California State University, Bakersfield, located in Bakersfield, California. The Roadrunners compete at the National Collegiate Athletic Association (NCAA) Division I level as a member of the Big West Conference.

== Nickname ==
Bakersfield's official team nickname is the "Roadrunners". In November 1970, thirty-three nicknames were put to a student vote. The final vote was between Roadrunners and El Cid with "Roadrunners" winning.

== History ==
The university is currently an NCAA Division I school, after previously competing at the Division II level and in the California Collegiate Athletic Association (CCAA). The Roadrunners began the transition process in 2006 and became a full Division I member in July 2010. Following a period as one of a tiny number of Division I independents, CSU Bakersfield joined the Western Athletic Conference in July 2013 for most sports. On November 27, 2017, CSUB announced that it would leave the WAC and join the Big West Conference on July 1, 2020.

The university began rebranding its athletic program as "Bakersfield" in the 2023–24 school year.

== Sports sponsored ==
Men's sports	Women's sports
Baseball	Basketball
Basketball	Beach volleyball
Soccer	Cross country
Swimming and diving	Golf
Outdoor track and field	Soccer
Wrestling	Softball
	Swimming and diving
	Track and field^{†}
	Volleyball
† – Women's track and field includes both indoor and outdoor

Most varsity teams representing California State University, Bakersfield compete in the Big West Conference. The wrestling team is in the Pac-12 Conference, the swimming and diving teams are in the Mountain Pacific Sports Federation, and the women's indoor track and field team competes as an independent. The swimming & diving teams will move to the Big West when it begins sponsoring the sport for both sexes in 2024–25.

=== Baseball ===
Big West Conference in Cal State Bakersfield's colors

On May 17, 2007, CSUB announced that Bill Kernen would be the school's first baseball coach, with the school's first official season beginning in Spring of 2009. The Roadrunners played their first baseball game on February 20, 2009 against Saint Louis University in an 8-7 loss, and recorded the first win in program history on February 21 with a 4-2 win against the Billikens. On September 20, 2011, the Roadrunners were invited to join the Western Athletic Conference as an affiliate member in baseball. On October 5, 2012 the Western Athletic Conference extended an invitation to the Roadrunners to join on July 1, 2013 as full members.

The Roadrunners won the 2015 WAC Baseball Tournament Championship in Mesa, Arizona and earned their first bid to the NCAA Regionals. The Roadrunners were placed in the Los Angeles Regional hosted by UCLA. CSUB lost twice to the host Bruins but managed to win the program's first postseason game when they defeated 2014 College World Series participant Ole Miss 2-1.

Bill Kernen retired following the 2015 season. Assistant coach Bob Macaluso was promoted to head coach in August 2015.

=== Basketball ===
==== Men's basketball ====
The Cal State Bakersfield Roadrunners men's basketball team represents California State University, Bakersfield. The team plays its home games at the Icardo Center.

==== Women's basketball ====
The Cal State Bakersfield Roadrunners men's basketball team represents California State University, Bakersfield. The team plays its home games at the Icardo Center.

=== Men's soccer ===
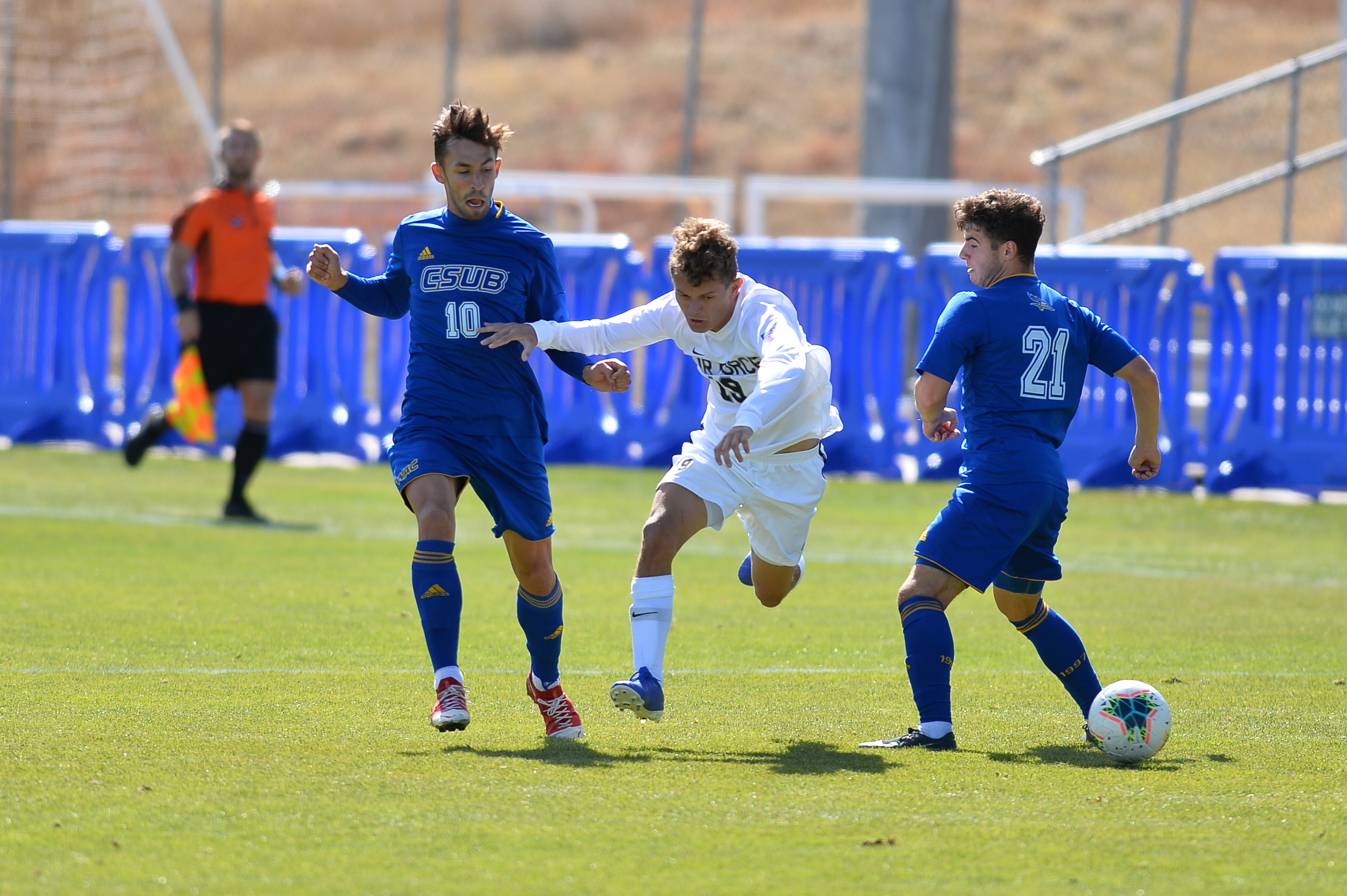
Cal State Bakersfield (in blue) v Air Force match in 2019

The Roadrunner men's soccer program won the 1997 Division II National Championship and has provided several MLS and international professionals to various rosters. Men's soccer was the first team to appear in a Division I postseason match when they earned an at-large spot in the 2011 NCAA Men's Soccer Tournament. The most notable soccer alumnus is Los Angeles Galaxy star and US Men's National Team striker Gyasi Zardes. Zardes competed for the Roadrunners from 2010-2012. He signed a MLS homegrown contract with the Galaxy in 2012.

The Cal State Bakersfield Roadrunners men's soccer team have an NCAA Division I Tournament record of 0–1 through one appearance.

Year	Round	Opponent	Result
2011	First Round	Saint Mary's	L 0–1

=== Softball ===
While still members of Division II, the Roadrunners won three NCAA tournaments: 1988, 1989, and 1990.

The CSUB softball team has reached the NCAA tournament once during the program's Division I tenure, in 2016. That year, the Roadrunners won the Western Athletic Conference (WAC) postseason tournament and earned the conference's automatic berth into the NCAA tournament. The Roadrunners are coached by Crissy Buck-Ziegler, who will enter the eighth year of her tenure with the 2019 season.

The Cal State Bakersfield Roadrunners softball team has an NCAA Division I Tournament record of 9-3.

Year	Round	Opponent	Result
2016	First Round	UCLA	L 0–7
2016	First Round	Fresno State	L 5-8

=== Women's volleyball ===
The CSUB Roadrunners enjoyed a successful NCAA Division II history including a 1989 National Championship. Following the Division I reclassification and the hiring of Giovana Melo as head coach, the Roadrunners won the Western Athletic Conference Tournament Championship in 2014 with a 3-0 victory over Seattle U in a tournament hosted in Bakersfield. The Roadrunners drew top-ranked Stanford and fell in the first round 25-21, 25-21 and 25-18. CSUB has appeared in three-straight WAC Tournament championship matches dating back to the 2013 season.

The Cal State Bakersfield Roadrunners women's volleyball team have an NCAA Division I Tournament record of 0–2 through two appearances.

Year	Round	Opponent	Result
2014	First Round	Stanford	L 0–3
2017	First Round	Stanford	L 0–3

=== Wrestling ===
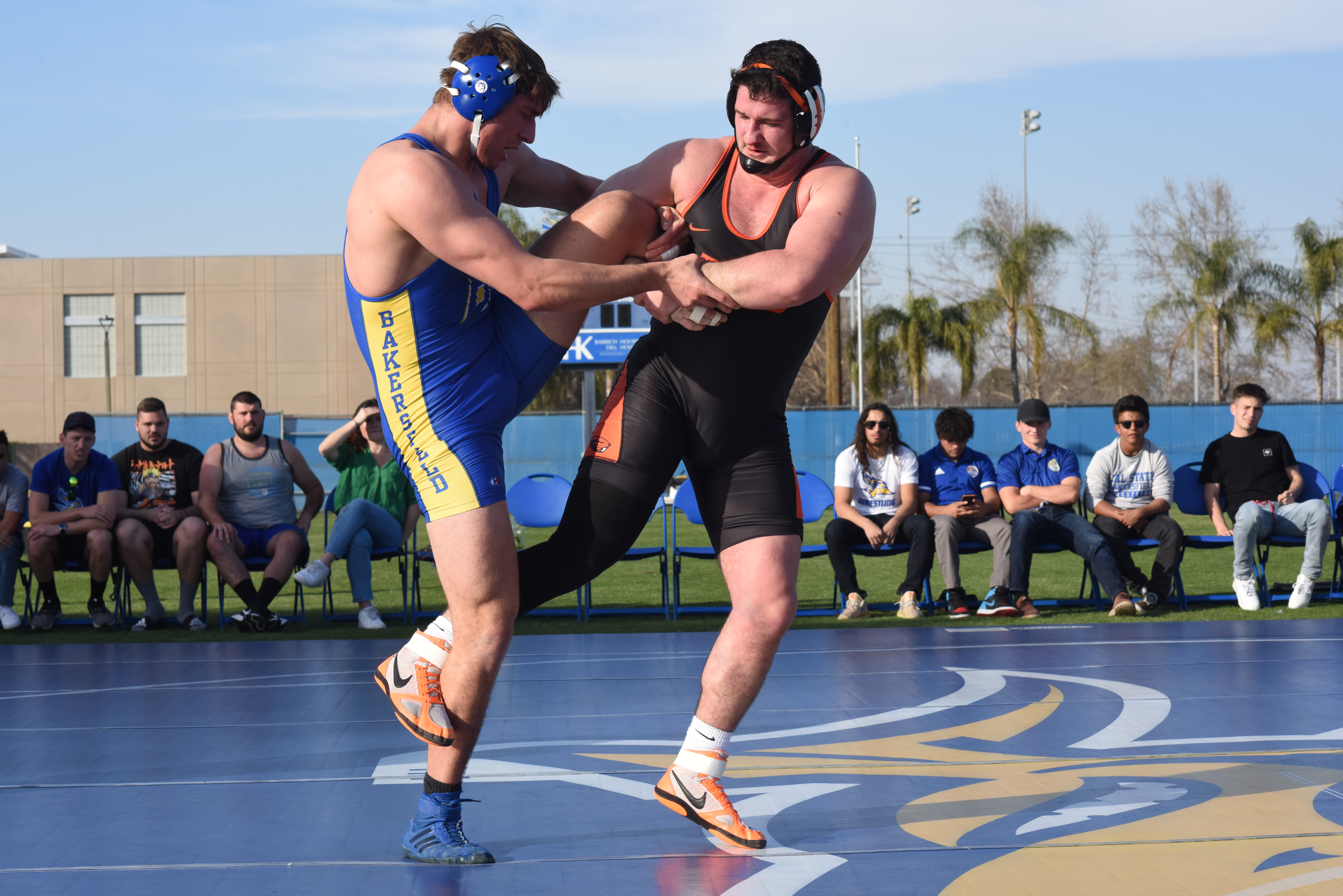
An outdoor wrestling match between Bakersfield and Oregon State at the Main Soccer Field in 2022

CSUB Wrestling has competed in the Pac-12 conference since the beginning of the 1987–88 season. CSUB wrestling is the institution's original Division I sport and has placed as high as 3rd (1996) and 8th (1997 & 1999) in the NCAA Division I Wrestling Championships. The Roadrunner Wrestling team has produced 9 individual NCAA DI Champions beginning in 1980. Stephen Neal (156, 1996-99) is the all-time winningest wrestler at CSU Bakersfield, with a record of 156-10 (the most wins of any CSUB wrestler), the most pins with 71 total, only 1 of 5 Roadrunner Wrestlers to be a 4-time All-American, as well as being a 2-time Division-I Champion in 1998 & 1999. CSUB alum Mike Mendoza served as the head coach until 2016. Current head coach Manny Rivera began his first year in the 2016–17 season. He is a former All-American at the University of Minnesota and was a member of their National Championship team. The wrestling team practices on campus in the John B. Antonino Sports Center (specifically for wrestling) and competes at the Icardo Center also on campus. For the past two years they have also held an annual match on the Main Soccer Field dubbing it the "Feud on the Field". Former Roadrunner wrestler and former UFC Champion Tito Ortiz set multiple UFC Light Heavyweight records.

The Cal State Bakersfield men's wrestling team appeared in the NCAA Division I Tournament thirty times, with their highest finish being 3rd place in the 1995–96 school year. Prior to Division I, the Roadrunners wrestling team won eight Division II titles, including five consecutive from 1979 to 1983.

Year	Gender	Ranking	Points
1988	Men	No. 53	2
1989	Men	No. 28	14 1/2
1990	Men	No. 12	30 1/2
1991	Men	No. 9	38 1/2
1992	Men	No. 36	5 1/2
1993	Men	No. 54	2 1/2
1994	Men	No. 49	4
1995	Men	No. 28	13
1996	Men	No. 3	66
1997	Men	No. 8	43 1/2
1998	Men	No. 11	42 1/2
1999	Men	No. 8	58 1/2
2000	Men	No. 23	20 1/2
2001	Men	No. 28	12 1/2
2002	Men	No. 52	3
2003	Men	No. 39	7 1/2
2004	Men	No. 29	15 1/2
2005	Men	No. 22	27
2006	Men	No. 47	4 1/2
2007	Men	No. 44	7
2008	Men	No. 53	2
2009	Men	No. 36	16
2010	Men	No. 35	16
2011	Men	No. 62	1
2013	Men	No. 60	1
2014	Men	No. 47	5
2015	Men	No. 58	1
2016	Men	No. 36	9 1/2
2017	Men	No. 53	1 1/2
2018	Men	No. 33	9 1/2

== Championships ==
=== Appearances ===
The CSU Bakersfield Roadrunners competed in the NCAA Tournament across 7 active sports (5 men's and 2 women's) 38 times at the Division I level.

- Baseball (1): 2015
- Men's basketball (1): 2016
- Men's soccer (1): 2011
- Softball (1): 2016
- Men's swimming and diving (1): 2014
- Women's volleyball (2): 2014, 2017
- Wrestling (31): 1988, 1989, 1990, 1991, 1992, 1993, 1994, 1995, 1996, 1997, 1998, 1999, 2000, 2001, 2002, 2003, 2004, 2005, 2006, 2007, 2008, 2009, 2010, 2011, 2013, 2014, 2015, 2016, 2017, 2018, 2019

=== Team ===
CSU Bakersfield has never won a national championship at the NCAA Division I level.

CSUB won 29 national championships and received the Sears Directors Cup in 1998 at the NCAA Division II level.

- Men's basketball (3): 1993, 1994, 1997
- Men's swimming and diving (13): 1986, 1987, 1988, 1989, 1990, 1991, 1992, 1993, 1998, 2000, 2001, 2002, 2004
- Wrestling (8): 1976, 1977, 1979, 1980, 1981, 1982, 1983, 1987
- Men's soccer (1): 1997
- Softball (3): 1988, 1989, 1990
- Women's volleyball (1): 1989

Below is one national championship that was not bestowed by the NCAA:

- Women's tennis: 1977 (AIAW)

=== Individual ===
CSU Bakersfield had 9 Roadrunners win NCAA individual championships at the Division I level.

NCAA individual championships
Order	School year	Athlete(s)	Sport	Source
1	1979–80	John Azevedo	Wrestling	
2	1979–80	Joe Gonzales	Wrestling	
3	1980–81	Dan Cuestas	Wrestling	
4	1981–82	Dan Cuestas	Wrestling	
5	1982–83	Adam Cuestas	Wrestling	
6	1983–84	Jesse Reyes	Wrestling	
7	1990–91	Paul Keysaw	Wrestling	
8	1997–98	Stephen Neal	Wrestling	
9	1998–99	Stephen Neal	Wrestling	

At the NCAA Division II level, CSU Bakersfield garnered 209 individual championships, where the Roadrunners are No. 4 in total NCAA Division II championships after the 2017–18 school year.

=== Conference championships ===
==== Western Athletic Conference Championships ====
- Volleyball, 2014
- Baseball, 2015
- Men's Basketball, 2016
- Softball, 2016
