= Mickey Jannis =

American baseball player (born 1987)

- Pitcher
- Born: December 16, 1987 (age 38); Carson City, Nevada, U.S.
- Batted: Right Threw: Right

MLB debut
- June 23, 2021, for the Baltimore Orioles

Last MLB appearance
- June 23, 2021, for the Baltimore Orioles

MLB statistics
- Win–loss record: 0–0
- Earned run average: 18.90
- Strikeouts: 1
- Stats at Baseball Reference

Teams
- Baltimore Orioles (2021)

Mickey Scott Jannis (born December 16, 1987) is an American former professional baseball knuckleball pitcher. He played in Major League Baseball (MLB) for the Baltimore Orioles. He was drafted by the Tampa Bay Rays in the 44th round of the 2010 MLB draft.

== Career ==
=== Tampa Bay Rays ===
Jannis was drafted by the Tampa Bay Rays in the 44th round, 1331st overall, of the 2010 Major League Baseball draft out of California State University, Bakersfield. He made his professional debut with the Rookie-level Princeton Rays, logging a 3–1 record and 2.52 ERA in 14 appearances. The next year, Jannis split the season between the Low-A Hudson Valley Renegades and the High-A Charlotte Stone Crabs, posting a cumulative 4–3 record and 3.30 ERA with 45 strikeouts in 57 1/3 innings of work. On October 18, 2011, Jannis was released by the Rays organization.

=== Lake Erie Crushers ===
On April 6, 2012, Jannis signed with the Lake Erie Crushers of the independent Frontier League. In 34 games for the Crushers, Jannis posted a 1–4 record and 2.53 ERA with 46 strikeouts.

=== Bridgeport Bluefish ===
In May 2013, Jannis signed with the Bridgeport Bluefish of the Atlantic League of Professional Baseball. In 10 games with Bridgeport, Jannis struggled to an 0–1 record and 7.56 ERA.

=== Lake Erie Crushers (second stint) ===
On June 11, 2013, Jannis was traded back to the Lake Erie Crushers of the Frontier League. Jannis pitched to a 7–2 record and 2.42 ERA in 24 appearances with the team and became a free agent after the year. On February 19, 2014, Jannis re-signed with the Crushers for the 2014 season. In 12 games, Jannis recorded a 3–4 record and 4.47 ERA with 57 strikeouts in 64 2/3 innings pitched.

=== Southern Maryland Blue Crabs ===
On July 29, 2014, Jannis signed with the Southern Maryland Blue Crabs of the Atlantic League of Professional Baseball. Jannis made 10 appearances for the Blue Crabs in 2014, registering a neat 2.37 ERA and 4–1 record with 36 strikeouts in 57 innings pitched.

=== Long Island Ducks ===
On March 17, 2015, Jannis signed with the Long Island Ducks of the Atlantic League of Professional Baseball. In 16 games with the Ducks, Jannis pitched to a 6–2 record with a stellar 1.18 ERA along with 67 strikeouts in 83 2/3 innings of work.

=== New York Mets ===
On July 2, 2015, Jannis's contract was purchased by the New York Mets organization and was assigned to the High-A St. Lucie Mets. In 11 games between St. Lucie and the Double-A Binghamton Mets, Jannis logged a 2–3 record and 3.55 ERA. He again played for Binghamton and St. Lucie in 2016, accumulating a 5–12 record and 5.69 ERA with 82 strikeouts in 140 2/3 innings of work. In 2017, Jannis returned to Binghamton, pitching to an 8–7 record and 3.60 ERA with 83 strikeouts in 122 1/3 innings pitched.

In 2018, Jannis split the year between Binghamton and the Triple-A Las Vegas 51s, posting a cumulative 10–8 record and 4.19 ERA in 26 appearances. For the 2019 season, Jannis split the season between Binghamton and the Triple-A Syracuse Mets, logging a 7–7 record and 4.15 ERA with 108 strikeouts. On November 4, 2019, he elected free agency.

=== Baltimore Orioles ===
On January 17, 2020, Jannis signed a minor league contract with the Baltimore Orioles organization. Jannis did not play in a game in 2020 due to the cancellation of the minor league season because of the COVID-19 pandemic. He was assigned to the Triple-A Norfolk Tides to begin the 2021 season, and recorded a 2.92 ERA in 7 appearances with the team.

On June 22, 2021, Jannis was selected to the 40-man roster and promoted to the major leagues for the first time. He allowed 7 runs in 3 1/3 innings of relief in his MLB debut in a 13–0 loss to the Houston Astros at Camden Yards the next night on June 23. Two days later, on June 25, Jannis was designated for assignment by the Orioles. He was outrighted to Norfolk on June 27. He elected minor league free agency following the season on November 7.

=== Chicago Dogs ===
On May 3, 2022, Jannis signed with the Chicago Dogs of the American Association of Professional Baseball. Jannis recorded a 0-2 record and 11.57 ERA in 3 appearances with the Dogs. On June 22, Jannis was released by the Dogs.

=== High Point Rockers ===
On July 30, 2022, Jannis signed with the High Point Rockers of the Atlantic League of Professional Baseball. Jannis made 11 appearances for the Rockers to close out the year, registering a 2.72 ERA with 44 strikeouts in 39 2/3 innings pitched. He became a free agent after the season.

Jannis returned to High Point for the 2023 season. In 27 games (23 starts) for the Rockers, he logged a 14–5 record and 4.01 ERA with 117 strikeouts in 146 innings of work. His 14 victories surpassed the High Point club record for wins, which was previously 11.

=== Saraperos de Saltillo ===
On April 9, 2024, Jannis signed with the Saraperos de Saltillo of the Mexican League. In 19 appearances for Saltillo, Jannis posted a 5.09 ERA with 31 strikeouts across 46 innings. He was released from the reserve list on October 17.

=== High Point Rockers (second stint) ===
On August 27, 2024, Jannis signed with the High Point Rockers of the Atlantic League of Professional Baseball. In 4 games (3 starts) he pitched a total of 17 2/3 innings, going 3–0 with a 3.06 ERA and 10 strikeouts. Jannis became a free agent following the season.

On May 22, 2025, Jannis announced his retirement from professional baseball.
