= Hohokam Stadium =

Spring training baseball park in Mesa, Arizona

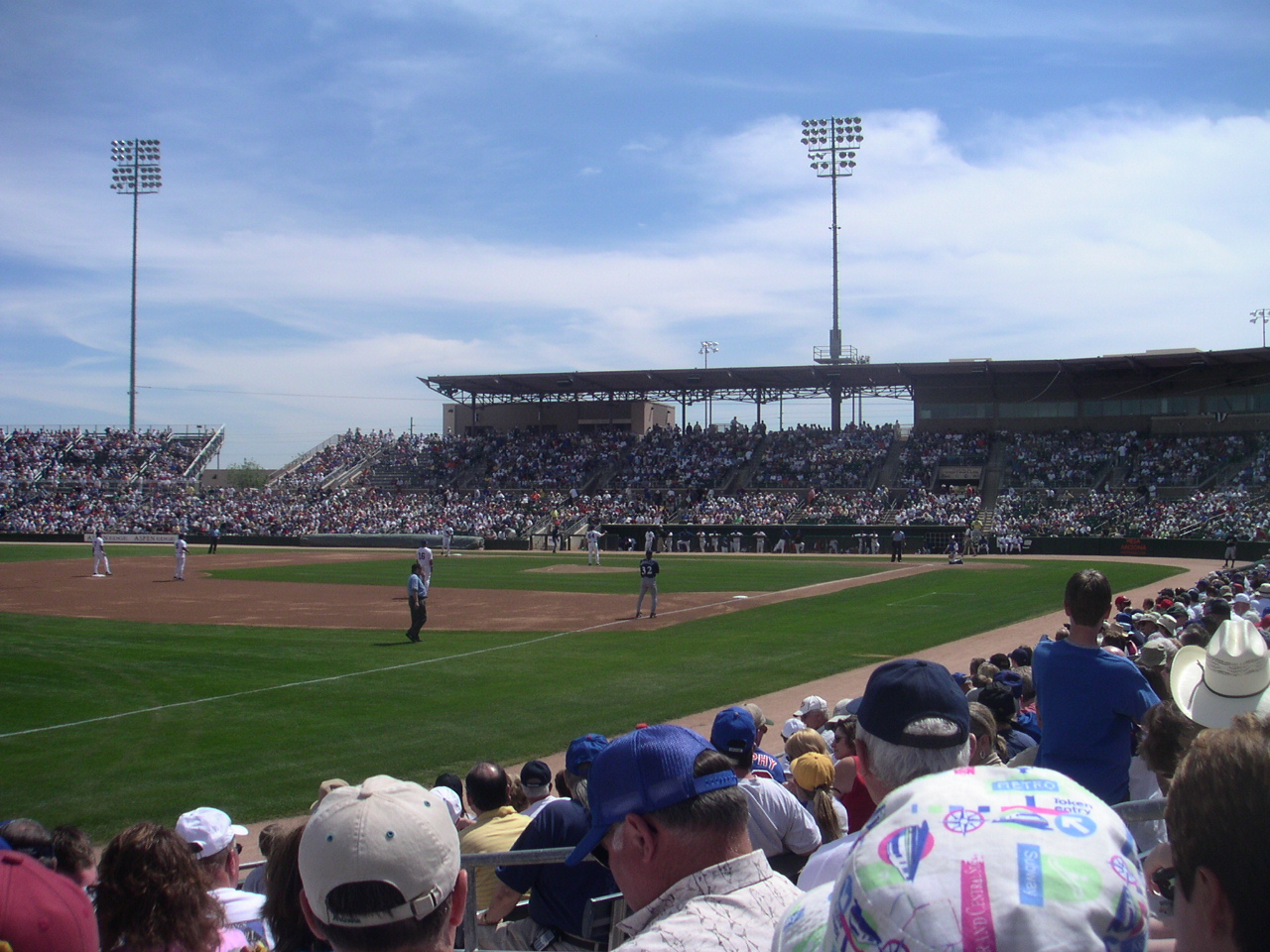
- March 2005
- Interactive map of Hohokam Stadium
- Full name: Hohokam Stadium; Dwight W. Patterson Field
- Former names: Hohokam Park (1997–2013)
- Address: 1235 N. Center Street
- Location: Mesa, Arizona, U.S.
- Coordinates: 33°26′17″N 111°49′48″W
- Elevation: 1,250 feet (380 m) AMSL
- Operator: Athletics
- Capacity: 10,500
- Surface: Natural grass
- Field size: Left Field: 340 feet (100 m); Center Field: 410 feet (120 m); Right Field: 350 feet (110 m)

Construction
- Opened: February 1997
- Renovated: 2014
- Architect: Populous (HOK Sport)
- Services engineers: Lloyd Civil & Sports Engineering

Tenants
- Oakland Athletics/Athletics (MLB) (spring training; 2015–present); Chicago Cubs (MLB) (spring training; 1997–2013); Mesa Solar Sox (AFL) (1999–2013); Mesa Miners (GBL) (2005); Mesa Desert Dogs (AFL) (2003); Arizona State (Pac-10) (2002); Mesa Saguaros (AFL) (1993–1995; 1997)

Hohokam Stadium (previously spelled HoHoKam), also known as Dwight W. Patterson Field and formerly Hohokam Park (1997–2013), is a 10,500-seat baseball park located in Mesa, Arizona, a suburb east of Phoenix. The stadium, named for the Hohokam people who occupied the region from approximately AD 1 to the mid-15th century, was completed in January 1997 after the original Hohokam Stadium (1976–1996) was demolished. In 2015, it became the spring training home of Major League Baseball's Athletics. The 2015 stadium and facility refresh was led by Populous.

Hohokam Stadium has the largest scoreboard in the Cactus League, measuring 12 by 16 feet (3.7 by 4.9 m).

== History ==
From 1997 to 2013, the stadium was the spring training home of the Chicago Cubs. In 1999, the Cubs drew 171,681 fans for its 15 home games, an average of 11,445 people per game. In 2007, the Cubs established a Cactus League single-game attendance record of 12,906. In 2009, the Cubs set a Major League Baseball and Cactus League single-season attendance record of 203,105 in 19 home games with an average per game attendance of 10,690, leading all MLB teams. Seven games had an attendance of over 13,000.

In 2002, the Arizona State University baseball team called Hohokam Park home while the on-campus Packard Stadium was being renovated.

The stadium hosted the 2010, 2011, 2012, 2015 and the 2016 WAC Tournaments.

The Chicago Cubs used the stadium until the completion of Sloan Park for the 2014 spring training season. That same season, the then Oakland Athletics took over Hohokam Stadium for spring training, and continue to use it.

== Hohokam Stadium (1976–1996) ==
The original Hohokam Stadium was built in 1976 just east of the site of the 1997 stadium. It was known as Hohokam Stadium from 1976 to 1995 and Hohokam Park in 1996. The stadium also became known as Dwight W. Patterson Field in 1991 with the name carrying over to the new stadium when it was built in 1997.

From 1977 to 1978, it was the spring training home of Major League Baseball's Oakland Athletics. From 1979 to 1996, the Chicago Cubs used that stadium as their spring training home until it was demolished in 1996 and replaced with the adjacent 1997 stadium. The Cubs set a number of spring training attendance records while they played in the stadium during the 1980s, frequently drawing over 100,000 fans over a single month of play.

The stadium began selling beer at the games in 1989.
