= Sloan Park =

Baseball park in Mesa, Arizona

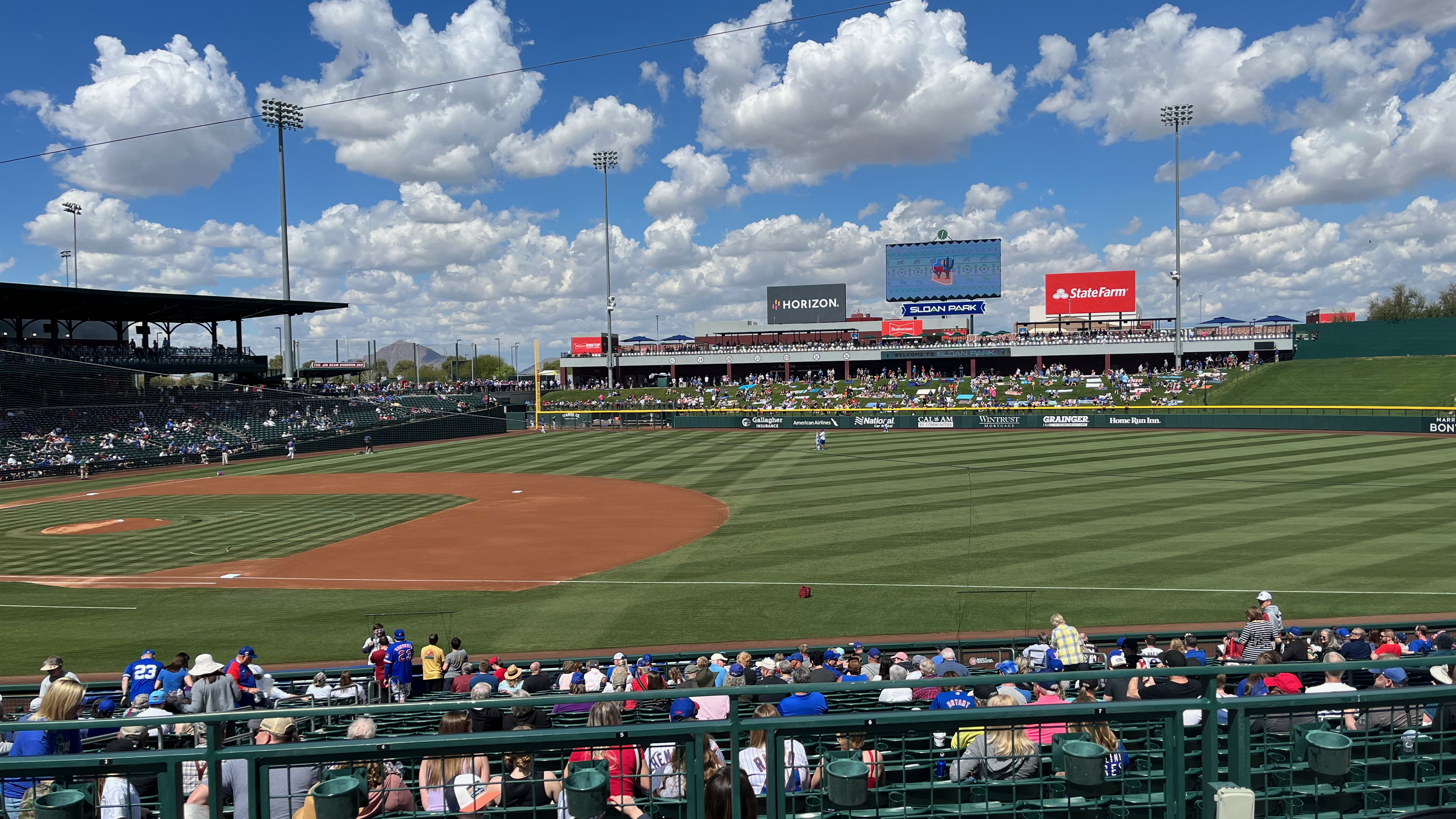
- Sloan Park in March 2023
- Interactive map of Sloan Park
- Former names: Cubs Park (2014)
- Address: 2330 W. Rio Salado Parkway; Mesa, Arizona; United States
- Coordinates: 33°25′53″N 111°52′54″W
- Owner: City of Mesa
- Operator: Chicago Cubs
- Capacity: 15,000
- Surface: Grass
- Record attendance: 16,161 (March 8, 2025 vs. Seattle)
- Field size: Left – 360 feet (110 m); LC – 366 feet (112 m); Center – 410 feet (125 m); RC – 398 feet (121 m); Right – 360 feet (110 m)

Construction
- Groundbreaking: July 11, 2012
- Opened: February 12, 2014; 12 years ago
- Cost: US$99 million
- Architects: Populous & DWL Architects + Planners, Inc.

Tenants
- Chicago Cubs (MLB) (spring training) (2014–present); Arizona League Cubs (AzL) (2014–present); Mesa Solar Sox (AFL) (2014–present); Mountain West Conference (NCAA) Baseball Tournament (2025–present)

Website
- www.mlb.com/cubs/sloan-park

Sloan Park is an American baseball park in Mesa, Arizona, that opened in 2014. Sloan Park is the spring training home of the Chicago Cubs, and serves as the home field of the Arizona League Cubs of the Arizona Complex League and the Mesa Solar Sox of the Arizona Fall League.

Sloan Park was built and paid for by residents of the City of Mesa, approved by ballot measure. It was primarily built to house spring training operations for the Chicago Cubs, who had previously played at nearby Hohokam Stadium. The stadium design was led by Populous. The dimensions of the playing surface closely match those of the Cubs' regular home stadium, Wrigley Field. There are many secondary fields at the park, most of which are training and practice fields.

With a capacity of 15,000, Sloan Park is the largest spring training stadium by capacity in Major League Baseball, surpassing Camelback Ranch in Glendale (coincidentally, spring training home of the Cubs' in-city rival the Chicago White Sox) by 2,000 seats.

The large capacity has allowed the Cubs to break spring training attendance records, drawing over 200,000 fans to Sloan Park in each of the park's first six seasons and again in 2023, attracting a Cactus League-record 250,893 fans in 2019, including a league-record 16,100 fans on March 25 vs. the Boston Red Sox. That single-game mark was shattered again on February 25, 2023, when the Cubs packed in 16,152 fans against the San Francisco Giants.

Formerly known as Cubs Park, on January 8, 2015, it was announced that Sloan Valve Company had signed a naming-rights deal to the ballpark, giving Sloan Park its name. The stadium is the newest stadium in the Cactus League. While it is home to these spring training games, it has also hosted some youth tournaments.

== See also ==
- Mesa Riverview
