= Sacramento State Hornets baseball =

NCAA Division I college baseball team

- 2026 Sacramento State Hornets baseball team
- Founded: 1949
- Overall record: 829–930–2
- University: California State University, Sacramento
- Head coach: Reggie Christiansen (16th season)
- Conference: Western Athletic Conference
- Location: Sacramento, California
- Home stadium: John Smith Field (Capacity: 1,200)
- Nickname: Hornets
- Colors: Green and gold

College World Series runner-up
- 1988 (Division II)

College World Series appearances
- 1986, 1988 (Division II)

NCAA tournament appearances
- Division II; 1968, 1969, 1970, 1974, 1975, 1985, 1986, 1988, 1989 Division I 2014, 2017, 2019

Conference tournament champions
- 2014, 2017, 2019

Conference regular season champions
- 2012, 2014, 2025

The Sacramento State Hornets baseball team represents California State University, Sacramento, which is located in Sacramento, California. The Hornets are an NCAA Division I college baseball program that competes in the Western Athletic Conference. They began competing in Division I in 1990 and re-joined the Western Athletic Conference in 2006. They were a part of the Big West Conference from 1997 to 2002.

The Sacramento State Hornets play all home games on campus at John Smith Field. The Hornets have played in three NCAA Division I Tournaments. Over their 19 discontinuous seasons in the Western Athletic Conference, they have won two WAC regular season titles and three WAC Tournaments.

Since the program's inception in 1949, six Hornets have gone on to play in Major League Baseball, including Philadelphia Phillies first baseman and outfielder Rhys Hoskins. Under head coach Reggie Christiansen, 22 Hornets have been drafted, including Rhys Hoskins who was selected in the fifth round of the 2014 Major League Baseball draft.

== Conference membership history ==
- 1990–1992: Independent
- 1993–1996: Western Athletic Conference
- 1997–2002: Big West Conference
- 2003–2005: Independent
- 2006–present: Western Athletic Conference

== John Smith Field ==
John Smith Field is a baseball stadium on the California State University, Sacramento campus in Sacramento, California that seats 1,200 people. It opened in 1953 and was known as Hornet Stadium. In 2010, it was named in honor of longtime coach John Smith.

== Head coaches (Division I only) ==
Records taken from the Sac State coaching history.

Season	Coach	Years	Record	Pct.
1990–2010	John Smith	21	526–673–2	.439
2011–present	Reggie Christiansen	14	426–362	.541
Totals	2 coaches	35 seasons	952–1035–2	.479

== Year-by-year NCAA Division I results ==
Records taken from the Sac State year-by-year results.

Statistics overview
Season	Coach	Overall	Conference	Standing	Postseason
Independent (1990–1992)
1990	John Smith	34–25			
1991	John Smith	41–23			
1992	John Smith	32–25			
Western Athletic Conference (1993–1996)
1993	John Smith	36–22	13–11	T-5th	
1994	John Smith	27–29	10–14	7th	
1995	John Smith	28–26	16–13	4th	
1996	John Smith	12–43	3–27	12th	
Big West Conference (1997–2002)
1997	John Smith	16–39	8–22	T-7th	
1998	John Smith	25–35	13–17	4th	Big West tournament
1999	John Smith	18–39	8–22	7th	
2000	John Smith	23–33	15–15	6th	
2001	John Smith	24–35	4–14	7th	
2002	John Smith	22–34	4–20	9th	
Independent (2003–2005)
2003	John Smith	33–24			
2004	John Smith	29–32			
2005	John Smith	20–36–1			
Western Athletic Conference (2006–present)
2006	John Smith	20–37	8–16	6th	WAC Tournament
2007	John Smith	17–40	10–14	6th	WAC Tournament
2008	John Smith	24–34	14–17	6th	WAC Tournament
2009	John Smith	27–27	8–14	7th	
2010	John Smith	18–35–1	7–17	7th	
2011	Reggie Christiansen	19–39	6–18	7th	
2012	Reggie Christiansen	31–28	11–7	T-1st	WAC tournament
2013	Reggie Christiansen	34–25	14–13	5th	WAC tournament
2014	Reggie Christiansen	40–24	21–6	1st	San Luis Obispo Regional
2015	Reggie Christiansen	33–27	16–11	T-4th	WAC tournament
2016	Reggie Christiansen	30–28	16–11	4th	WAC tournament
2017	Reggie Christiansen	32–29	12–12	4th	Stanford Regional
2018	Reggie Christiansen	35–25	17–7	T-2nd	WAC tournament
2019	Reggie Christiansen	40–25	18–9	T-4th	Stanford Regional
2020	Reggie Christiansen	9–7			Season cancelled on March 18 due to Coronavirus pandemic
Total:		829–930–2			
National champion Postseason invitational champion Conference regular season champion Conference regular season and conference tournament champion Division regular season champion Division regular season and conference tournament champion Conference tournament champion

== NCAA Tournament appearances ==
Sacramento State began playing Division I baseball in 1990. They have played in the NCAA Division I baseball tournament three times. The Hornets have a record of 2–6.

Year	Region	Opponent	Result
2014	San Luis Obispo Regional	Cal Poly; Arizona State; Cal Poly	L 2–4; W 5–4; L 5–6
2017	Stanford Regional	Stanford; BYU	L 0–10; L 1–6
2019	Stanford Regional	Stanford; UC Santa Barbara; Stanford	L 0–11; W 6–4; L 3–12

== Awards and honors (Division I only) ==
- Over their 31 seasons in Division I, two Hornets have been named to an NCAA-recognized All-America team.
- Over their 19 discontinuous seasons in the Western Athletic Conference, 8 different Hornets have been named to the all-conference first-team.
- Over their 6 seasons in the Big West Conference, one Hornet was named to the all-conference first-team.

=== All-Americans ===
Year	Position	Name	Team	Selector
2009	OF	Tim Wheeler	2nd	BA
2014	1B	Rhys Hoskins	3rd	CB

=== Freshman First-Team All-Americans ===
Year	Position	Name	Selector
2009	SP	Jesse Darrah	CB
2012	OF	Rhys Hoskins	NCBWA
2013	DH	Chris Lewis	CB
2013	RP	Sutter McLoughlin	BA
2013	RP	Sutter McLoughlin	CB
2013	RP	Sutter McLoughlin	NCBWA
2014	SP	Sam Long	CB
2017	SP	Parker Brahms	CB
2018	SP	Scott Randall	CB

=== Western Athletic Conference Coach of the Year ===
Year	Name
2012	Reggie Christiansen
2014	Reggie Christiansen

=== Western Athletic Conference Player of the Year ===
Year	Position	Name
1995	P	Mike Eby
2012	2B	Andrew Ayers
2014	1B	Rhys Hoskins

=== Western Athletic Conference Freshman of the Year ===
Year	Position	Name
2012	OF	Rhys Hoskins
2013	DH	Chris Lewis
2014	P	Sam Long
2017	P	Parker Brahms

Taken from the Sac State awards and honors page. Updated March 21, 2020.

== Hornets in the Major Leagues ==
= All-Star	= Baseball Hall of Famer

Athlete	Years in MLB	MLB teams
La Schelle Tarver	1986	Boston Red Sox
Keith Brown	1988, 1990–1992	Cincinnati Reds
Gary Wilson	1995	Pittsburgh Pirates
Erik Bennett	1995–1996	California Angels, Minnesota Twins
Roland de la Maza	1997	Kansas City Royals
Rhys Hoskins	2017–present	Philadelphia Phillies, Milwaukee Brewers
Sam Long	2021-present	San Francisco Giants, Oakland Athletics, Kansas City Royals
James Outman	2022–present	Los Angeles Dodgers
Nathan Lukes	2023–present	Toronto Blue Jays
Travis Adams	2025–present	Minnesota Twins

Taken from the Sac State Hornets in the Pros page.

== See also ==
- List of NCAA Division I baseball programs
