= Seattle Redhawks baseball =

Seattle Redhawks
- 2026 Seattle Redhawks baseball team
- University: Seattle University
- Head coach: Donny Harrel (18th season)
- Conference: West Coast Conference
- Location: Bellevue, Washington
- Home stadium: Bannerwood Park (Capacity: 300+)
- Nickname: Redhawks
- Colors: Red and white

NCAA tournament appearances
- 1954

Conference regular season champions
- WAC: 2016

The Seattle Redhawks baseball team represents Seattle University, which is located in Seattle, Washington. The Redhawks are an NCAA Division I college baseball program that competes in the West Coast Conference (WCC). They joined the WCC in July 2025, having previously played in the conference from 1971 to 1980 before the entire program was moved to the National Association of Intercollegiate Athletics (NAIA); they never participated in the NAIA tournament. They eventually returned to NCAA Division II in 2002 and in 2009, they re-joined NCAA Division I; they are 300-411-2 since joining Division I, although the program has had eleven players selected in the MLB draft since 2015, which have included Tarik Skubal and Janson Junk.

== NCAA Tournament ==
Seattle has participated in the NCAA Division I baseball tournament once.

Year	Round	Opponent	Result
1954	District 8 First Round; District 8 Lower Round	Oregon; USC	L 4–9; L 0–9

== See also ==
- List of NCAA Division I baseball programs
