= Jeff Dodson =

American former college baseball coach

Playing career
- 1988–89: Bevill State
- 1991–92: Livingston

Coaching career (HC unless noted)
- 1995–96: Bevill State
- 1997–03: Martin Methodist
- 2004–08: Southeast Missouri State (assistant)
- 2009–16: North Dakota

Head coaching record
- Overall: 352–473–1 (college)

Jeff Dodson is an American former college baseball coach. He served the head coach of the University of North Dakota baseball program from 2009 until it was discontinued after the 2016 season.

== Playing career ==
Dodson played two seasons at Bevill State Community College, earning an associate degree in 1989. He then played at Livingston University—now known as the University of West Alabama—completing his bachelor's degree in 1993.

== Coaching career ==
In 1995, Dodson returned to Bevill State as head coach, a position he held for two seasons. He compiled a record of 31–77. In 1997, he moved to Martin Methodist College as head coach. In seven seasons, he led the RedHawks to a 190–144 record and placed four players into the professional ranks. In 2004, he moved to Southeast Missouri State as an assistant coach. He served as recruiting coordinator and pitching coach for five seasons. After the 2008 season, Dodson was named head coach at North Dakota, managing the transition to Division I. He led the program into the Great West Conference and later the Western Athletic Conference.

He led the Fighting Sioux to a winning season in 2013, as well as a winning record in the WAC in 2015 and a trip to the conference tournament. However, the team sank to an 8-37 record in 2016. On April 12, 2016, the University of North Dakota announced the baseball program would be discontinued at the end of the 2016 season. The elimination of the North Dakota program ended Dodson's college coaching career.

== Head coaching record ==
This table shows Dodson's record as a head coach at the Division I level.

Record table
Season	Team	Overall	Conference	Standing	Postseason
North Dakota Fighting Sioux (NCAA Division I) (2009)
2009	North Dakota	14–29			
University of North Dakota (Great West Conference) (2010–2013)
2010	North Dakota	19–35	13–15	5th	GWC Tournament
2011	North Dakota	12–35	7–17	7th	GWC Tournament
2012	North Dakota	19–37	10–18	6th	GWC Tournament
2013	North Dakota	25–22–1	13–11	5th	GWC Tournament
University of North Dakota (Western Athletic Conference) (2014–2016)
2014	North Dakota	10–29	8–16	8th	
2015	North Dakota	24–27	16–11	4th	WAC Tournament
2016	North Dakota	8–37	4–23	10th	
North Dakota:		131–252–1	71–111		
Total:		131–252–1			
