= Manny Mantrana =

College baseball coach (1964–2021)

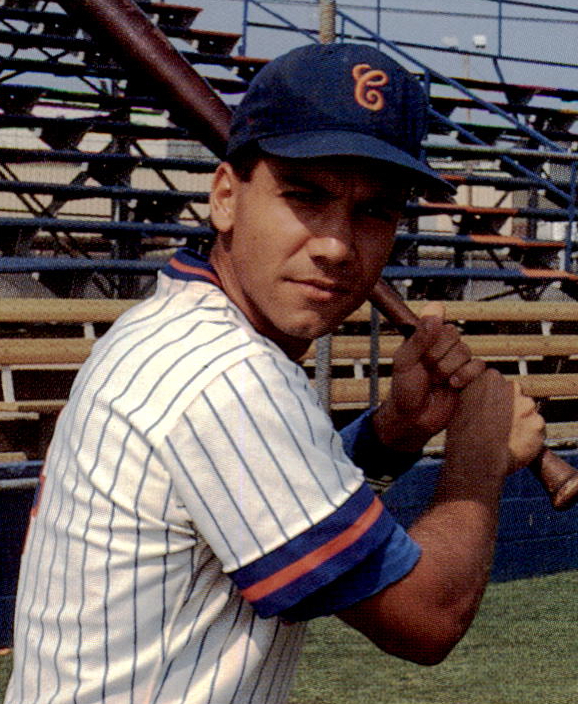
- Mantrana with the Columbia Mets c. 1988

Current position
- Title: Head coach

Biographical details
- Born: September 28, 1964; Miami, Florida, U.S.
- Died: April 21, 2021 (aged 56); Miami, Florida, U.S.

Playing career
- 1982: Miami Dade
- 1983: Middle Georgia
- 1984–1985: LSU

Coaching career (HC unless noted)
- 1996: Miami Dade (Asst.)
- 1997–2008: St. Thomas
- 2009–2017: UTPA/UTRGV

Manny Mantrana (September 28, 1964 – April 21, 2021) was an American college baseball coach, formally serving as the UTRGV Vaqueros baseball head coach. He held that position since prior to the 2009 season, when the program was known as the Texas–Pan American Broncs and represented the University of Texas–Pan American (UTPA).

In 2015, UTRGV entered into operation after the merger of UTPA with the nearby University of Texas at Brownsville. The UTPA athletic program was inherited by UTRGV, and Mantrana kept his position through the merger. He then became the women's golf temporary head coach for UTRGV in the fall of 2017. On May 24, 2017, he announced that he was stepping down as coach, with Mantrana being tapped to serve as a special assistant to the director of athletics.

He died on April 21, 2021, following a battle with cancer.

== Playing career ==
After graduating from Miami Jackson High School, Mantrana attended Miami Dade for one season. He then transferred to Middle Georgia, where he helped the Warriors to the 1983 NJCAA World Series. He earned was named to the All-Tournament team and was MVP of the regional tournament while Middle Georgia finished second in the tournament. He then played two seasons at LSU for Skip Bertman. Although Mantrana had been drafted several times previously (after high school and three times during junior college), he was not drafted at the end of his collegiate career. He signed a professional contract with the Detroit Tigers. He played three seasons in Class A in the Tigers and New York Mets organizations before ending his playing career.

== Coaching career ==
Mantrana began his coaching career at Miami Jackson High School, where he served for four seasons before moving to Miami Dade as an assistant. After one year, he earned the head coaching job at St. Thomas. In his twelve seasons with the NAIA Bobcats, the team appeared in the postseason nine times and earned three NAIA World Series berths. Over 95% of his players earned their degrees, and at least 25 went on to play professionally. He compiled a record of 434–193–1. He was honored as Southeasat Coach of the Year and Florida Sun Conference Coach of the Year three times each.

He became head coach at Texas–Pan American for the 2009 season, and led them into the Great West Conference, going 52–58 in conference play in four seasons. With the dissolution of that league, the Broncs moved to the Western Athletic Conference, remaining in that league through the merger that created UTRGV. In four seasons with the WAC, he went 40–61–1 in conference play.

== Head coaching record ==
Record table
Season	Team	Overall	Conference	Standing	Postseason
Texas–Pan American Broncs (Independent) (2009)
2009	Texas–Pan American	14–41			
Texas–Pan American (Great West Conference) (2010–2013)
2010	Texas–Pan American	22–33	9–18	6th (8)	GWC Tournament (Note: For each of the four Great West Tournaments, all eight teams played in the tournament)
2011	Texas–Pan American	21–32	10–18	6th (8)	GWC Tournament
2012	Texas–Pan American	30–22	16–12	2nd (8)	GWC Tournament
2013	Texas–Pan American	28–30	17–10	3rd (8)	GWC Tournament
Texas–Pan American Broncs/UTRGV Vaqueros (Western Athletic Conference) (2014–2017)
2014	Texas–Pan American	27–30	17–10	3rd	WAC Tournament
2015	Texas–Pan American	21–30–1	6–20–1	10th	
2016	UTRGV	21–28	10–14	8th	
2017	UTRGV	26–28	7–17	8th	
Total:		210–274–1			
National champion Postseason invitational champion Conference regular season champion Conference regular season and conference tournament champion Division regular season champion Division regular season and conference tournament champion Conference tournament champion
