= Jared Moon =

American baseball coach and former catcher

Biographical details
- Born: April 20, 1971 (age 54); Houston, Texas, U.S.

Playing career
- 1990–1994: Houston Baptist
- Position(s): Catcher

Coaching career (HC unless noted)
- 1995–2005: Houston Baptist (asst.)
- 2006–2021: Houston Baptist

Head coaching record
- Overall: 401–441–2

Accomplishments and honors

Championships
- RRAC tournament (2006); RRAC regular season (2006, 2007); GWC tournament (2013); Southland tournament (2015)

Jared Wayne Moon (born April 4, 1971) is an American baseball coach and former catcher. He played college baseball at Houston Baptist for coaches Rickey Witt & Rusty Pendergrass from 1990 to 1994. He was also the head coach of the Houston Baptist Huskies from 2006–2021.

== Early life ==
Moon attended Aldine High School in Houston, Texas, where he played for the school's varsity baseball team. He then enrolled at Houston Baptist University, where he played for the Houston Baptist Huskies baseball team as a catcher.

== Coaching career ==
Upon graduation, Moon was named an assistant at Houston Baptist. After 11 seasons as an assistant, he was promoted to head coach when Brian Huddleston retired. In their final season in the National Association of Intercollegiate Athletics (NAIA), the Huskies advanced to the NAIA World Series, where they finished third. He led the Huskies to their first NCAA Division I baseball tournament championship in 2013, winning the Great West Conference. Two years after moving to the Southland Conference, he guided the Huskies to their first ever NCAA Division I baseball tournament appearance. The following spring he was rewarded with a contract extension. On May 27, 2021, Moon stepped down as the head coach of the Huskies.

== Head coaching record ==
Statistics overview
Season	Team	Overall	Conference	Standing	Postseason
Houston Baptist Huskies (Red River Athletic Conference) (2006–2007)
2006	Houston Baptist	40–16–1	14–1	1st	NAIA Regional
2007	Houston Baptist	44–20	12–3	T–1st	NAIA College World Series
Houston Baptist Huskies (Division I Independents) (2008–2009)
2008	Houston Baptist	23–24			
2009	Houston Baptist	11–40			
Houston Baptist Huskies (Great West Conference) (2010–2013)
2010	Houston Baptist	28–31	15–13	3rd	
2011	Houston Baptist	22–40	16–12	T–3rd	
2012	Houston Baptist	28–33	15–13	T–4th	
2013	Houston Baptist	34–24–1	17–10	T–2nd	
Houston Baptist Huskies (Southland Conference) (2014–2021)
2014	Houston Baptist	23–28	12–18	10th	
2015	Houston Baptist	28–27	14–13	7th	NCAA Regional
2016	Houston Baptist	24–29	12–18	10th	
2017	Houston Baptist	29–25	18–12	4th	
2018	Houston Baptist	29–30	18–12	T–3rd	
2019	Houston Baptist	18–35	10–20	12th	
2020	Houston Baptist	6–11	2–1		Season canceled due to COVID-19
2021	Houston Baptist	14–38	11–27	13th	
Houston Baptist:		401–441–2	186–173		
Total:		401–441–2			
National champion Postseason invitational champion Conference regular season champion Conference regular season and conference tournament champion Division regular season champion Division regular season and conference tournament champion Conference tournament champion
