= Carl Iwasaki =

American baseball coach and player (1961–2024)

Biographical details
- Born: October 30, 1961; Honolulu, Hawaii, U.S.
- Died: February 7, 2024 (aged 62)

Playing career
- 1981–1984: Northern Colorado
- Position: Catcher

Coaching career (HC unless noted)
- 2003: Saddleback CC (asst.)
- 2004: Austin (asst.)
- 2005–2010: Austin
- 2011–2022: Northern Colorado

Head coaching record
- Overall: 321–515
- Tournaments: WAC: 2–8; NCAA: 0–0

Accomplishments and honors

Championships
- Great West regular season (2013)

Awards
- Great West Coach of the Year (2013)

Carl Keiji Iwasaki (October 30, 1961 – February 7, 2024) was an American baseball coach and catcher. He played college baseball at Northern Colorado for coach Tom Petroff from 1981 to 1984. He then served as the head of the Austin Kangaroos (2005–2010) and the Northern Colorado Bears (2011–2022).

== Early life ==
Iwasaki graduated from Punahou School in 1980, then played four seasons at Northern Colorado from 1981 through 1984, graduating in 1985.

== Coaching career ==
Iwasaki spent five years coaching the Bakersfield Braves select team and three years with Hawaii Winter Baseball. He then served as an assistant coach for two seasons with the Saddleback Gauchos junior college team in Mission Viejo, California.

Next, he worked two seasons at Division III before being elevated to the top job for five seasons. He made the rare jump from Division III to newly Division I Northern Colorado in the summer of 2010.

In first three seasons with the Bears, he led the team to a Great West Conference title and the championship game of the 2011 Great West Conference baseball tournament. Iwasaki earned GWC Coach of the Year honors in 2013. The Bears joined the Western Athletic Conference for the 2014 season. Iwasaki retired from coaching following the 2022 season.

== Death ==
Iwasaki died on February 7, 2024, at the age of 62.

== Head coaching record ==
Record table
Season	Team	Overall	Conference	Standing	Postseason
Austin Kangaroos (American Southwest Conference) (2005–2006)
2005	Austin	10–25	5–16	8th (East)	
2006	Austin	19–22	9–12	T–5th (East)	
Austin Kangaroos (Southern Collegiate Athletic Conference) (2007–2010)
2007	Austin	22–25	9–6	2nd (Western)	NCAA D-III Regional
2008	Austin	18–24	7–9	4th (Western)	
2009	Austin	15–24	5–15	5th (Western)	
2010	Austin	19–20	9–11	3rd (Western)	
Austin:		103–140	44–69		
Northern Colorado Bears (Great West Conference) (2011–2013)
2011	Northern Colorado	24–32	19–7	2nd	Great West Tournament
2012	Northern Colorado	27–33	15–13	4th	Great West Tournament
2013	Northern Colorado	33–24	20–7	1st	Great West Tournament
Northern Colorado Bears (Western Athletic Conference) (2014–2021)
2014	Northern Colorado	10–43	4–23	10th	
2015	Northern Colorado	16–32	12–14	7th	WAC Tournament
2016	Northern Colorado	16–34	11–12	6th	WAC Tournament
2017	Northern Colorado	24–30	10–14	6th	WAC Tournament
2018	Northern Colorado	29–24	11–13	5th	WAC Tournament
2019	Northern Colorado	12–35	8–19	T-8th	
2020	Northern Colorado	4–13	0–0		Season canceled due to COVID-19
2021	Northern Colorado	11–36	7–24	9th	WAC Tournament
Northern Colorado Bears (Summit League) (2022)
2022	Northern Colorado	12–39	8–16	6th	
Northern Colorado:		218–375	125–161		
Total:		321–515			
National champion Postseason invitational champion Conference regular season champion Conference regular season and conference tournament champion Division regular season champion Division regular season and conference tournament champion Conference tournament champion
