= Brian Guiliana =

Playing career
- 1993–1996: George Washington
- Position: Outfielder

Coaching career (HC unless noted)
- 2011–2012: NJIT (Asst.)
- 2013–2018: NJIT

Head coaching record
- Overall: 112–183–1
- Tournaments: Great West: 1–2; Atlantic Sun: 0–2; NCAA: 0–0

Brian Guiliana in an American college baseball coach and former outfielder. He played college baseball for the George Washington Revolutionaries from 1993 to 1996 under head coach Jay Murphy. Guiliana was the head baseball coach at the New Jersey Institute of Technology (NJIT) from 2013 to 2018.

On June 20, 1991, Guiliana committed to play baseball at George Washington. Guiliana served as captain and led the Colonials in home runs in his senior season. From 2006 through 2010, he served as a scout for the Florida Marlins, covering New Jersey and the northeast. He worked as the only full-time assistant coach at NJIT in 2011 and 2012, handling recruiting and on field duties, and took over as head coach after Mike Cole was fired. In all of his seasons, he has led the Highlanders to 20 wins or more. On August 23, 2018, Guiliana stepped down as the head coach at NJIT.

== Head coaching record ==
Record table
Season	Team	Overall	Conference	Standing	Postseason
NJIT Highlanders (Great West Conference) (2013)
2013	NJIT	20–34	11–16	6th (8)	Great West Tournament (Note: All eight of the Great West's teams qualified for the tournament in 2013.)
NJIT Highlanders (Independent) (2014–2015)
2014	NJIT	20–25			
2015	NJIT	24–23–1			
NJIT Highlanders (ASUN Conference) (2016–2018)
2016	NJIT	17–36	2–18	8th	
2017	NJIT	9–40	2–19	8th	
2018	NJIT	22–25	9–12	6th	Atlantic Sun Tournament
NJIT:		112–183–1	24–65		
Total:		112–183–1			
National champion Postseason invitational champion Conference regular season champion Conference regular season and conference tournament champion Division regular season champion Division regular season and conference tournament champion Conference tournament champion
