= Eric Madsen =

American baseball coach and player

Biographical details
- Education: Bellevue University

Playing career
- 1991–1992: Eastern Utah
- 1993–1994: Southern Utah

Coaching career (HC unless noted)
- 1995–1996: Eastern Utah (Asst.)
- 1997–2003: Eastern Utah
- 2004–2008: Utah Valley (Asst.)
- 2009–2021: Utah Valley

Head coaching record
- Overall: 305–357
- Tournaments: GWC: 12–2; WAC: 8–6; NCAA: 0–2

Accomplishments and honors

Awards
- GWC Coach of the Year: 2010, 2011, 2012

Eric Madsen is an American baseball coach and former player. He played college baseball at Eastern Utah from 1991 to 1992 before transferring to Southern Utah. He then served as the head coach of the Eastern Utah Golden Eagles (1997–2003) and Utah Valley Wolverines (2009–2021). Madsen took Utah Valley to its first NCAA Regional in 2016 and during his career has amassed a record of 305–357

== Playing career ==
Madsen graduated from Bonneville High School in Idaho Falls, Idaho where he lettered in three sports. In baseball, he was a three-year starter, earned all-City honors twice, and was named Athlete of the Year in his senior season as a pitcher and infielder. He attended Eastern Utah for two seasons then completed his eligibility at Southern Utah.

== Coaching career ==
After his playing days ended in the 1994 season, Madsen returned to Eastern Utah as an assistant coach. After two seasons, he was elevated to the top post. In his seven seasons guiding the Golden Eagles, he coached future MLB pitcher Willie Eyre. After completing his degree at Bellevue University, Madsen became an assistant at Utah Valley, his first four-year coaching position. During his five seasons as a Wolverines assistant, he coached several future professionals, including Kam Mickolio, the first Utah Valley product to reach MLB. In 2009, Madsen became head coach and guided the Wolverines through the final stages of their upgrade to Division I, which was completed in 2010. The Wolverines won the first three Great West Conference regular season and Tournament championships, including a 28–0 regular season in 2012. In that same season, the Wolverines were nationally ranked for the first time in school history, held the nation's longest winning streak at 32 games, led the nation in several offensive categories, and recorded the most wins in Division I prior to the NCAA tournament. Despite this resume, the Wolverines were not invited to compete in the tournament. In 2014, Madsen guided the Wolverines into the Western Athletic Conference. On April 27, 2021, Madsen resigned as the head coach of the Wolverines.

== Head coaching record ==
This table reflects Madsen's record as a head coach at the Division I level.

Record table
Season	Team	Overall	Conference	Standing	Postseason
Utah Valley Wolverines (Great West Conference) (2009–2013)
2009	Utah Valley	18–35			
2010	Utah Valley	42–17	26–2	1st (8)	GWC tournament (Note: All 8 of the GWC's teams qualified for the Tournament in 2010.)
2011	Utah Valley	34–22	22–2	1st (8)	GWC tournament (Note: All 8 of the GWC's teams qualified for the Tournament in 2011.)
2012	Utah Valley	47–12	28–0	1st (8)	GWC tournament (Note: All 8 of the GWC's teams qualified for the Tournament in 2012.)
2013	Utah Valley	24–30	15–9	4th (8)	GWC tournament (Note: All 8 of the GWC's teams qualified for the Tournament in 2013.)
Utah Valley Wolverines (Western Athletic Conference) (2014–2021)
2014	Utah Valley	28–30	16–11	4th	WAC tournament
2015	Utah Valley	15–29	11–10	6th (10)	WAC tournament
2016	Utah Valley	37–23	18–9	3rd (10)	NCAA Regional
2017	Utah Valley	18–36	11–13	4th	WAC tournament
2018	Utah Valley	15–37	8–18	9th	
2019	Utah Valley	15–41	9–18	7th	
2020	Utah Valley	5–14	0–0		Season canceled due to COVID-19
2021	Utah Valley	7–31	5–19	10th	WAC tournament
Utah Valley:		305–357	171–111		
Total:		305–357			
National champion Postseason invitational champion Conference regular season champion Conference regular season and conference tournament champion Division regular season champion Division regular season and conference tournament champion Conference tournament champion
