= Michael Cole =

Michael or Mike Cole may refer to:

== Arts and entertainment ==
- Michael Cole (writer) (1933–2001), British writer and TV producer
- Michael Cole (actor) (1940–2024), American actor
- Michael Cole (wrestling) (born 1966), American professional wrestling commentator
- Michael Cole or Mikael Judas (born 1974), American professional wrestler
- Michael Cole (singer), Australian singer and actor

== Sports ==
- Michael Cole (footballer, born 1937), English association football player
- Michael Cole (footballer, born 1966), English association football player
- Mike Cole (baseball), college baseball coach
- Mike Cole (long jumper), winner of the 1965 long jump at the NCAA Division I Indoor Track and Field Championships

== Others ==
- Michael Cole (psychologist) (born 1938), American psychologist and professor
- Michael Cole (public relations) (born 1943), former BBC journalist and spokesman for Mohamed Al-Fayed
- Mike Cole (politician) (born 1971/72), New York State politician
- Michael Cole (politician), Irish politician

== See also ==
- Michael Coles (disambiguation)
- Myke Cole (born 1973), writer of fantasy novels
