= 2010 Great West Conference baseball tournament =

- Teams: 8
- Format: Round Robin
- Finals site: Edinburg Stadium; Edinburg, TX
- Champions: Utah Valley (1st title)
- Winning coach: Eric Madsen (1st title)
- MVP: Chris Benson (Utah Valley)

2010 Great West Conference baseball standings
	Conf.				Overall
Team	W		L	PCT	W		L	PCT
Utah Valley ‍†‍‡‍	26	–	2	.929	42	–	17	.712
Northern Colorado ‍‍‍	22	–	6	.786	34	–	24	.586
Houston Baptist ‍‍‍	15	–	13	.536	28	–	31	.475
NYIT ‍‍‍	15	–	13	.536	11	–	26	.297
North Dakota ‍‍‍	13	–	15	.464	19	–	35	.352
Texas–Pan American ‍‍‍	9	–	18	.333	22	–	33	.400
NJIT ‍‍‍	9	–	18	.333	13	–	44	.228
Chicago State ‍‍‍	2	–	26	.071	4	–	52	.071
† – Conference champion ‡ – Tournament champion As of May 29, 2011; Rankings from Coaches' Poll

The 2010 Great West Conference baseball tournament took place from May 26 through 29. This was the first Great West Conference baseball tournament. All eight of the league's teams met in the round robin tournament held at University of Texas–Pan American's Edinburg Stadium in Edinburg, Texas. Utah Valley won the championship by a score of 4-3. As the Great West is a new conference, the league does not have an automatic bid to the 2010 NCAA Division I baseball tournament.

== Seeding and format ==
The league's eight teams were seeded by conference winning percentage, with head to head matchups used for tiebreakers. The teams were then divided into two pools with the winners of each pool meeting in a single elimination final.

Team	W	L	Pct.	GB	Seed
Utah Valley	26	2	.929	–	1
Northern Colorado	22	6	.786	4	2
NYIT	15	13	.536	11	3
Houston Baptist	15	13	.536	11	4
North Dakota	13	15	.464	13	5
Texas-Pan American	9	18	.333	16.5	6
NJIT	9	18	.333	16.5	7
Chicago State	2	26	.071	24	8

== Results ==
	Division A	UVU	HBU	UND	CSU	Overall
1	Utah Valley		W 9–2	W 11–7	W 9–8	3–0
4	Houston Baptist	L 2–9		W 9–3	W 11–6	2–1
5	North Dakota	L 7–11	L 3–9		W 8–2	1–2
8	Chicago State	L 8–9	L 6–11	L 2–8		0–3

	Division B	UNC	NYIT	UTPA	NJIT	Overall
2	Northern Colorado		L 1–11	W 10–0	W 9–1	2–1
3	NYIT	W 11–1		L 4–6	W 14–4	2-1
6	Texas-Pan American	L 0–10	W 6–4		W 14–1	2–1
7	NJIT	L 1–9	L 4–14	L 1–14		0-3

Finals
A	Utah Valley	4
B	Northern Colorado	3

Northern Colorado advanced to the championship game by virtue of its head to head win over Texas–Pan American.

== All-Tournament Team ==
The following players were named to the All-Tournament Team.

Name	School
Johnathan Moore	Houston Baptist
Stephen Nikonchik	Houston Baptist
Paul Prestera	Houston Baptist
Frank Ryan	NYIT
Effrey Valdez	NYIT
Mike Raudenbush	Northern Colorado
Mark Shannon	Northern Colorado
Joe Willman	Northern Colorado
Jake Magner	North Dakota
Vincent Mejia	Texas-Pan American
Chris Benson	Utah Valley
Zane Gray	Utah Valley
Goose Kallunki	Utah Valley
Sage Thorpe	Utah Valley

=== Most Valuable Player ===
Chris Benson was named Tournament Most Valuable Player. Benson was an outfielder for Utah Valley.
