= Cougar Stadium =

Cougar Stadium may refer to:

- Cougar Stadium (Provo), Utah, the college football stadium for the BYU Cougars, now named LaVell Edwards Stadium
- Cougar Stadium (Chicago State), Illinois, the baseball stadium for the Chicago State Cougars
- Cougar Softball Stadium, Houston, Texas, the softball stadium for the Houston Cougars
- Martin Stadium, Pullman, Washington, the college football stadium for the WSU Cougars

== See also ==
- Cougar Park, a rugby league stadium in Keighley, England, which is the home stadium of Keighley Cougars
