= Mike Cole (baseball) =

American college baseball coach and former third baseman

Current position
- Title: Associate head coach
- Team: Army
- Conference: Patriot League

Playing career
- 1998–2001: Vermont
- Position(s): Third baseman

Coaching career (HC unless noted)
- 2002–2004: Vermont (asst.)
- 2005–2008: Manhattan (asst.)
- 2009: Vermont (asst.)
- 2010: Maine (asst.)
- 2011–2012: NJIT
- 2013–2017: Fairfield (asst.)
- 2018–2022: Manhattan
- 2023–present: Army (AHC)

Head coaching record
- Overall: 135–184
- Tournaments: NCAA: 0–0

Michael J. Cole is an American college baseball coach and former third baseman, who is the current associate head baseball coach for the Army Black Knights. Cole played college baseball at the University of Vermont from 1998 to 2001 for coach Bill Currier. He also served as the head coach of the NJIT Highlanders (2011–2012) and the Manhattan Jaspers (2018–2022)

== Playing career ==
Cole attended Arlington High School in LaGrange, New York. Cole played for the school's varsity baseball team all four years. Cole then enrolled at the University of Vermont, to play college baseball for the Vermont Catamounts baseball team.

As a freshman at the University of Vermont in 1998, Cole had a .338 batting average, a .423 on-base percentage (OBP) and a .387 SLG.

As a sophomore in 1999, Cole batted .285 with a .380 SLG, 1 home run, and 37 RBIs.

In the 2000 season as a junior, Cole hit 4 home runs and 11 doubles.

Cole had his best season as a senior in 2001, leading the team in doubles (18), home runs (4), RBIs (40), batting average (.340) and slugging (.545). He was named Second Team All-America East Conference.

In 2011, Cole was elected into the University of Vermont Athletics Hall of Fame.

== Coaching career ==
In 2002, Cole began his coaching career as an assistant at Vermont. In 2005, Cole accepted a position as an assistant with the Manhattan Jaspers baseball program. Cole returned to Vermont in 2009, but the team's program was folded at the conclusion of the season. Cole joined the Maine Black Bears baseball staff, re-joining Steve Trimper's staff who he worked for in 2005. On August 24, 2010, Cole was named the head coach for the NJIT Highlanders baseball program. Following a program record 25-win season at the NCAA Division I level, Cole was arrested and later fired by NJIT. On October 16, 2012, Cole was hired by his former coach, Bill Currier, on the Fairfield Stags baseball staff. On January 5, 2016, Cole was promoted to Associate head coach.

On August 17, 2017, Cole was named the head coach of the Manhattan Jaspers. In Cole's first season, the Jaspers improved their wins by 8, but failed to qualify for the 2018 Metro Atlantic Athletic Conference baseball tournament. On August 18, 2022, Cole resigned from his position as head coach of the Jaspers. He collected 90 wins in 5 seasons. He soon thereafter took the associate head coach position with the Army Black Knights.

== Head coaching record ==
Statistics overview
Season	Team	Overall	Conference	Standing	Postseason
NJIT Highlanders (Great West Conference) (2011–2012)
2011	NJIT	20–35	12–16	5th	Great West Tournament
2012	NJIT	25–27	16–12	3rd	Great West Tournament
NJIT:		45–62	28–28		
Manhattan Jaspers (Metro Atlantic Athletic Conference) (2018–2022)
2018	Manhattan	25–28	13–11	7th	
2019	Manhattan	26–33	15–9	T-3rd	
2020	Manhattan	3–11	0–0		Season canceled due to COVID-19
2021	Manhattan	12–24	12–22	8th	MAAC Tournament
2022	Manhattan	24–26	12–12	7th	
Manhattan:		90–122	52–54		
Total:		135–184			
National champion Postseason invitational champion Conference regular season champion Conference regular season and conference tournament champion Division regular season champion Division regular season and conference tournament champion Conference tournament champion

== See also ==
- List of current NCAA Division I baseball coaches
