= Great West Conference baseball tournament =

Great West Conference baseball tournament (defunct)
- Conference baseball championship
- Sport: Baseball
- Conference: Great West Conference
- Number of teams: 8
- Format: Double-elimination
- Played: 2010-2013
- Last contest: 2013
- Most championships: Utah Valley (3)
- Official website: GreatWestConference.org baseball

Host stadiums
- Edinburg Stadium (2010); Harold Kraft Memorial Field (2011); Brent Brown Ballpark (2012); Bears & Eagles Riverfront Stadium (2013)

Host locations
- Edinburg, TX (2010); Grand Forks, ND (2011); Orem, UT (2012); Newark, NJ (2013)

The Great West Conference baseball tournament, sometimes referred to simply as the Great West tournament, was the conference baseball championship of the NCAA Division I Great West Conference. The eight members of the league played in the double-elimination tournament, which in its final season (2013) was played at Bears & Eagles Riverfront Stadium in Newark, New Jersey. Because of the league's provisional status in Division I, the winner of the tournament did not receive an automatic berth to the NCAA Division I Baseball Championship.

== Champions ==
=== By year ===
The following is a list of conference champions and sites listed by year.

Year	Program	Winning score	Runner-up	Site	MVP
2010	Utah Valley	4–3	Northern Colorado	Edinburg Stadium • Edinburg, TX	Chris Benson (Utah Valley)
2011	Utah Valley	5–1	Houston Baptist	Harold Kraft Memorial Field • Grand Forks, ND	Chris Benson (Utah Valley)
2012	Utah Valley	10–6	Houston Baptist	Brent Brown Ballpark • Orem, UT	Billy Burgess (Utah Valley)
2013	Houston Baptist	13–3	Northern Colorado	Bears & Eagles Riverfront Stadium • Newark, NJ	Luke Clements (Houston Baptist)

=== By school ===
The following is a list of conference champions listed by school.

Program	No. of titles	Title years
Utah Valley	3	2010, 2011, 2012
Houston Baptist	1	2013
