= Michael Coles =

Michael Coles may refer to:

- Michael Coles (speedway rider) (born 1965), British speedway rider
- Michael Coles (cricketer) (born 1981), English cricketer
- Michael Coles (actor) (1936–2005), English actor
- Michael Coles (businessman), American businessman
- Mike Coles (born 1944), New Zealand cricketer

== See also ==
- Michael Cole (disambiguation)
