= 2015 Southland Conference softball tournament =

- Teams: 6
- Format: Double-elimination tournament
- Finals site: Lady Demon Diamond; Natchitoches, Louisiana
- Champions: Central Arkansas (1 title)
- Winning coach: David Kuhn (1 title)
- MVP: Kylee Studioso (Central Arkansas)
- Attendance: 5,432
- Television: ESPN3

The 2015 Southland Conference tournament was held at Lady Demon Diamond on the campus of Northwestern State University in Natchitoches, Louisiana, from May 6 through May 8, 2015. The tournament winner, Central Arkansas earned the Southland Conference's automatic bid to the 2015 NCAA Division I softball tournament. The Championship game was broadcast on ESPN3 with the remainder of the tournament airing on the Southland Digital Network.

== Format ==
The top 6 teams qualify for the Southland softball tournament. Abilene Christian and Incarnate Word are currently ineligible due to their transition from D2 to D1. Had either of the two teams been in the top 6 spots, the seventh and if necessary eighth teams would have qualified for the tournament and would have taken their respective spots.

2015 Southland Conference softball standings
	Conf.						Overall
Team	W		L		PCT		W	L		PCT
East Division
Northwestern State ** ^{x} ‍‍‍	22	–	3	–	0	.880		36	–	18	–	0	.667
McNeese State ‍‍‍	21	–	5	–	0	.808		36	–	20	–	0	.643
Central Arkansas ‡ ‍‍‍	16	–	8	–	0	.667		35	–	21	–	0	.625
Southeastern Louisiana ‍‍‍	15	–	10	–	0	.600		22	–	30	–	0	.423
Lamar ‍‍‍	14	–	10	–	0	.583		26	–	28	–	0	.481
Nicholls ‍‍‍	12	–	14	–	0	.462		26	–	22	–	0	.542
West Division
Texas A&M–Corpus Christi ^{x} ‍‍‍	15	–	11	–	0	.577		20	–	28	–	1	.418
Stephen F. Austin ‍‍‍	11	–	15	–	0	.423		19	–	32	–	0	.373
Sam Houston ‍‍‍	10	–	15	–	0	.400		19	–	28	–	0	.404
Abilene Christian * ‍‍‍	8	–	19	–	0	.296		14	–	33	–	0	.298
Houston Baptist ‍‍‍	5	–	20	–	0	.200		13	–	32	–	0	.289
Incarnate Word * ‍‍‍	4	–	23	–	0	.148		12	–	39	–	0	.235
‡ – SLC Tournament Champion *ineligible for postseason play due to Div. I transition **Southland Tournament #1 seed^{x} Division Champions champion As of May 22, 2015; Rankings from USA Today/NFCA Coaches

== Tournament ==
Upper round 1
4	Southeastern Louisiana	1
5	Lamar	3
3	Central Arkansas	1
6	Texas A&M-CC	0^{(13)}
Lower round 1
1	Northwestern State	3
6	Texas A&M-CC	1
2	McNeese State	1
4	Southeastern Louisiana	5

Upper round 2
1	Northwestern State	1
5	Lamar	6
2	McNeese State	2
3	Central Arkansas	6
Lower round 2
1	Northwestern State	9
4	Southeastern Louisiana	2

Upper final
5	Lamar	0
3	Central Arkansas	7
Lower final
5	Lamar	10
1	Northwestern State	16^{(9)}

Final
3	Central Arkansas	4
1	Northwestern State	2

- All times listed are Central Daylight Time.

== Line Scores ==
=== Day One ===
==== Game 1 (Texas A&M-Corpus Christi vs Central Arkansas) ====
May 6, 2015 11:00 am CDT at Lady Demon Diamond, Natchitoches, LA
Team	1	2	3	4	5	6	7	8	9	10	11	12	13	R	H	E
Texas A&M-Corpus Christi	0	0	0	0	0	0	0	0	0	0	0	0	0	0	1	0
Central Arkansas	0	0	0	0	0	0	0	0	0	0	0	0	1	1	12	0
WP: Studioso, K. (25–12) LP: Carter, L. (14–17) Sv: None; Attendance: 375; Notes: Longest game in Southland Conference softball tournament history

==== Game 2 (Lamar vs Southeastern Louisiana) ====
May 6, 2015 3:00 pm CDT at Lady Demon Diamond, Natchitoches, LA
Team	1	2	3	4	5	6	7	R	H	E
Lamar	0	0	0	1	0	1	1	3	7	0
Southeastern Louisiana	1	0	0	0	0	0	0	1	6	3
WP: Napoli, L. (18–16) LP: Bishop, T. (14–8) Sv: None; Attendance: 403

==== Game 3 (Central Arkansas vs McNeese State) ====
May 6, 2015 5:30 pm CDT at Lady Demon Diamond, Natchitoches, LA
Team	1	2	3	4	5	6	7	R	H	E
Central Arkansas	2	4	0	1	0	0	0	6	5	0
McNeese State	0	0	1	0	0	0	1	2	5	1
WP: Studioso, K. (25–12) LP: Smith, R. (12–6) Sv: None; Attendance: 641

==== Game 4 (Lamar vs Northwestern State) ====
May 6, 2015 8:15 pm CDT at Lady Demon Diamond, Natchitoches, LA
Team	1	2	3	4	5	6	7	R	H	E
Lamar	2	0	0	0	1	3	0	6	10	1
Northwestern State	0	0	1	0	0	0	0	1	6	1
WP: Napoli, L. (18–16) LP: Brown, M. (11–3) Sv: None; Attendance: 819

=== Day Two ===
==== Game 5 (Northwestern State vs Texas A&M-Corpus Christi) ====
May 7, 2015 11:00 am CDT at Lady Demon Diamond, Natchitoches, LA
Team	1	2	3	4	5	6	7	R	H	E
Northwestern State	0	0	1	0	2	0	0	3	5	1
Texas A&M-Corpus Christi	0	1	0	0	0	0	0	1	6	0
WP: Brown, M. (12–3) LP: Carter, L. (14–18) Sv: Bouvier, M. (1); Attendance: 412

==== Game 6 (Southeastern Louisiana vs McNeese State) ====
May 7, 2015 1:30 pm CDT at Lady Demon Diamond, Natchitoches, LA
Team	1	2	3	4	5	6	7	R	H	E
Southeastern Louisiana	1	1	0	2	0	1	0	5	6	0
McNeese State	0	0	0	0	0	0	0	0	1	2
WP: Adkinson, S. (4–5) LP: Vincent, E. (14–6) Sv: None; Attendance: 383

==== Game 7 (Central Arkansas vs Lamar) ====
May 7, 2015 5:30 pm CDT at Lady Demon Diamond, Natchitoches, LA
Team	1	2	3	4	5	6	7	R	H	E
Central Arkansas	3	0	0	1	3	0	0	7	8	0
Lamar	0	0	0	0	0	0	0	0	4	4
WP: Studioso, K. (27–12) LP: Napoli, L. (19–17) Sv: None; Attendance: 397

==== Semi-final Game One (Southeastern Louisiana vs Northwestern State) ====
May 7, 2015 7:45 pm CDT at Lady Demon Diamond, Natchitoches, LA
Team	1	2	3	4	5	6	7	R	H	E
Southeastern Louisiana	2	0	0	0	0	0	0	2	8	0
Northwestern State	1	1	4	3	0	0	X	9	14	0
WP: Bouvier, M. (14–5) LP: Bishop, T. (14–9) Sv: None; Attendance: 661

=== Day Three ===
==== Semi-final Game Two (Northwestern State vs Lamar) ====
May 9, 2015 10:30 am CDT at Lady Demon Diamond, Natchitoches, LA
Team	1	2	3	4	5	6	7	8	9	R	H	E
Northwestern State	0	0	2	1	4	0	3	0	6	16	17	1
Lamar	2	3	2	1	0	1	1	0	0	10	15	1
WP: Brown, M. (13–3) LP: Dannelley, L (8–8) Sv: None; Attendance: 639; Notes: Northwestern State and Lamar combine for a total of 32 hits a tournament record

==== Championship Game (Northwestern State vs Central Arkansas) ====
May 9, 2015 2:20 pm CDT at Lady Demon Diamond, Natchitoches, LA
Team	1	2	3	4	5	6	7	R	H	E
Northwestern State	2	0	0	0	0	0	0	2	6	2
Central Arkansas	3	0	0	0	1	0	X	4	6	2
WP: Gomness, K. (4–1) LP: Brown, M. (13–4) Sv: None; Attendance: 702; Notes: Central Arkansas wins first Southland Conference softball tournament championship

== Awards and honors ==
Tournament MVP: Kylee Studioso – Central Arkansas

All-Tournament Teams:

- Sarah Bigej – Central Arkansas
- Sam Forrest – Central Arkansas
- Jessie Taylor – Central Arkansas
- Brianna Whisenhunt – Central Arkansas
- Micayla Sorosiak – Northwestern State
- Kellye Kincannon – Northwestern State
- Sarah Ragsdale – Lamar
- Laura Napoli – Lamar
- Katie Lacour – Southeastern Louisiana
- Spencer Adkinson – Southeastern Louisiana

== See also ==
2015 Southland Conference baseball tournament
