= 2012 Great West Conference baseball tournament =

Baseball tournament

- Teams: 8
- Format: Double-elimination
- Finals site: Brent Brown Ballpark; Orem, UT
- Champions: Utah Valley (3rd title)
- Winning coach: Eric Madsen (3rd title)
- MVP: Billy Burgess (Utah Valley)

2012 Great West Conference baseball standings
	Conf.				Overall
Team	W		L	PCT	W		L	PCT
Utah Valley ‍†‍‡‍	28	–	0	1.000	47	–	12	.797
Texas-Pan American ‍‍‍	16	–	12	.571	30	–	22	.577
NJIT ‍‍‍	16	–	12	.571	25	–	27	.481
Northern Colorado ‍‍‍	15	–	13	.536	27	–	33	.450
Houston Baptist ‍‍‍	15	–	13	.536	28	–	33	.459
North Dakota ‍‍‍	10	–	18	.357	19	–	37	.339
Chicago State ‍‍‍	9	–	19	.321	14	–	40	.259
NYIT ‍‍‍	3	–	25	.107	5	–	46	.098
† – Conference champion ‡ – Tournament champion As of May 31, 2012; Rankings from Coaches' Poll

The 2012 Great West Conference baseball tournament took place from May 22 through 26. All eight of the league's teams met in the double-elimination tournament to be held at Utah Valley University's Brent Brown Ballpark in Orem, Utah. Utah Valley won their third championship by a score of 10-6, having advanced undefeated in conference regular season and tournament play. As the Great West is a new conference, the league does not have an automatic bid to the 2012 NCAA Division I baseball tournament. Utah Valley has won all three Great West Conference baseball tournaments.

== Seeding ==
All eight teams will be seeded based on conference winning percentage only.

Team	W	L	Pct.	GB	Seed
Utah Valley	28	0	1.000	–	1
Texas-Pan American	16	12	.571	12	2
NJIT	16	12	.571	12	3
Northern Colorado	15	13	.536	13	4
Houston Baptist	15	13	.536	13	5
North Dakota	10	18	.357	18	6
Chicago State	9	19	.321	19	7
NYIT	3	25	.107	25	8

== Results ==
Upper round 1	Upper round 2	Upper final	Final
3	NJIT	0
6	North Dakota	1
6	North Dakota	18
2	Texas-Pan American	7
2	Texas-Pan American	10
7	Chicago State	4
6	North Dakota	4
1	Utah Valley	15
4	Northern Colorado	3
5	Houston Baptist	10
5	Houston Baptist	8
1	Utah Valley	9
1	Utah Valley	17
8	NYIT	10	1	Utah Valley	10
5	Houston Baptist	6
Lower round 1	Lower round 2	Lower round 3	Lower final
5	Houston Baptist	8
3	NJIT	7	7	Chicago State	4	6	North Dakota	8
7	Chicago State	11	5	Houston Baptist	11	5	Houston Baptist	13
4	Northern Colorado	5
2	Texas-Pan American	13
4	Northern Colorado	11	4	Northern Colorado	14
8	NYIT	1

== All-Tournament Team ==
The following players were named to the All-Tournament Team.

Name	School
Jonathan Carpen	Chicago State
Kolby Arnst	Houston Baptist
Jake Gonzalez	Houston Baptist
Collin Hetzler	Houston Baptist
Jeff Campbell	North Dakota
Kris Kwak	North Dakota
Andrew Thome	North Dakota
Tony Crudo	Northern Colorado
Jake Johnson	Northern Colorado
Angel Ibanez	Texas–Pan American
Billy Burgess	Utah Valley
Cole Butcher	Utah Valley
Alex Exon	Utah Valley
Jake Rickenbach	Utah Valley

=== Most Valuable Player ===
Billy Burgess was named Tournament Most Valuable Player. Burgess was an outfielder for Utah Valley.
