= 2011 Great West Conference baseball tournament =

- Teams: 8
- Format: Double-elimination
- Finals site: Harold Kraft Memorial Field; Grand Forks, ND
- Champions: Utah Valley (2nd title)
- Winning coach: Eric Madsen (2nd title)
- MVP: Chris Benson (Utah Valley)

2011 Great West Conference baseball standings
	Conf.				Overall
Team	W		L	PCT	W		L	PCT
Utah Valley ‍†‍‡‍	22	–	2	.917	34	–	22	.607
Northern Colorado ‍‍‍	19	–	7	.731	24	–	32	.429
Houston Baptist ‍‍‍	16	–	12	.571	22	–	40	.355
NYIT ‍‍‍	13	–	12	.520	19	–	32	.373
NJIT ‍‍‍	12	–	16	.429	20	–	35	.364
Texas–Pan American ‍‍‍	10	–	18	.357	21	–	32	.396
North Dakota ‍‍‍	7	–	17	.292	12	–	35	.255
Chicago State ‍‍‍	4	–	19	.174	9	–	41	.180
† – Conference champion ‡ – Tournament champion As of May 28, 2011; Rankings from Coaches' Poll

The 2011 Great West Conference baseball tournament took place from May 24 through 28. All eight of the league's teams met in the double-elimination tournament to be held at University of North Dakota's Harold Kraft Memorial Field in Grand Forks, ND. Utah Valley won their second championship by a score of 10-6. As the Great West is a new conference, the league does not have an automatic bid to the 2011 NCAA Division I baseball tournament.

== Seeding ==
The top four finishers from the regular season will be seeded one through four.

Team	W	L	Pct.	GB	Seed
Utah Valley	22	2	.917	–	1
Northern Colorado	19	7	.731	4	2
Houston Baptist	16	12	.571	8	3
NYIT	13	12	.520	9.5	4
NJIT	12	16	.429	12	5
Texas-Pan American	10	18	.357	14	6
North Dakota	7	17	.292	15	7
Chicago State	4	19	.174	17.5	8

== Results ==
Upper round 1	Upper round 2	Upper final	Final
1	Utah Valley	13
8	Chicago State	3
1	Utah Valley	5
4	NYIT	3
4	NYIT	3
5	NJIT	2
1	Utah Valley	3
7	North Dakota	2
3	Houston Baptist	6
6	Texas-Pan American	5
3	Houston Baptist	2
7	North Dakota	8
2	Northern Colorado	1
7	North Dakota	5	1	Utah Valley	5
3	Houston Baptist	1
Lower round 1	Lower round 2	Lower round 3	Lower final
3	Houston Baptist	17
8	Chicago State	2	5	NJIT	3	7	North Dakota	1
5	NJIT	5	3	Houston Baptist	6	3	Houston Baptist	7
4	NYIT	3
4	NYIT	4
6	Texas-Pan American	5	2	Northern Colorado	3
2	Northern Colorado	7

== All-Tournament Team ==
The following players were named to the All-Tournament Team.

Name	School
Kolby Arnst	Houston Baptist
Collin Hetzler	Houston Baptist
Stephen Nikonchik	Houston Baptist
Beau Warren	Houston Baptist
Tripp Davis	NJIT
Ryan Gerber	North Dakota
David Spies	North Dakota
Casey Coy	Northern Colorado
Marcus Perez	NYIT
Effrey Valdez	NYIT
Chris Benson	Utah Valley
Billy Burgess	Utah Valley
Blake Krahenbuhl	Utah Valley
Josh Swenson	Utah Valley

=== Most Valuable Player ===
Chris Benson was named Tournament Most Valuable Player for the second year in a row. Benson was an outfielder for Utah Valley.
