= Great West Conference women's basketball tournament =

Former conference championship tournament

Great West Conference women's basketball tournament (defunct)
- Conference basketball championship
- Sport: Basketball
- Conference: Great West Conference
- Number of teams: 6
- Format: Single-elimination tournament
- Current stadium: Emil and Patricia Jones Convocation Center
- Current location: Chicago, IL
- Played: 2010–2013
- Last contest: 2013
- Current champion: NJIT Highlanders
- Most championships: Utah Valley/Chicago State/North Dakota/NJIT (1)

The Great West Conference women's basketball tournament was the conference championship tournament in basketball for the Great West Conference. The tournament was held every year between 2010 and 2013. It was a single-elimination tournament and seeding was based on regular season records.

== History ==
Year	Champion	Score	Runner-up	Location
2010	Utah Valley	70–62	North Dakota	McKay Events Center • Orem, UT
2011	Chicago State	74–66	North Dakota	McKay Events Center • Orem, UT
2012	North Dakota	69–56	Utah Valley	Emil and Patricia Jones Convocation Center • Chicago, IL
2013	NJIT	52–42	Utah Valley	Emil and Patricia Jones Convocation Center • Chicago, IL

== Winners by school ==
Member	Winners	Winning years
¹Utah Valley	1	2010
¹Chicago State	1	2011
¹North Dakota	1	2012
¹NJIT	1	2013

¹ former member of Great West Conference
