= UCCU Ballpark =

Baseball stadium in Orem, Utah, United States

- Location in the United States Location in Utah
- Interactive map of UCCU Ballpark
- Former names: Brent Brown Ballpark (2007–17); Parkway Crossing Stadium (2005–07)
- Address: 800 West University Parkway
- Location: Orem, Utah, U.S.
- Coordinates: 40.277°N 111.717°W
- Elevation: 4,580 ft (1,395 m)
- Owner: Utah Valley University
- Operator: Utah Valley University
- Capacity: 5,000
- Surface: FieldTurf DoublePlay
- Record attendance: 6,209 (July 24, 2013)
- Field size: Left Field – 305 feet (93 m); Left-Center – 427 feet (130 m); Center Field – 408 feet (124 m); Right-Center – 388 feet (118 m); Right Field – 312 feet (95 m)
- Public transit: UVX (at UVU station)

Construction
- Groundbreaking: 2004
- Opened: March 24, 2005; 21 years ago
- Cost: $6 million ($10.2 million in 2025 dollars)
- Architect: EMA
- General contractors: R & O Construction

Tenants
- Utah Valley Wolverines (2005–present); Orem Owlz (2005–2020)

DoTerra Field at UCCU Ballpark (formerly known as Brent Brown Ballpark), is a baseball park in the western United States, on the campus of Utah Valley University (UVU) in southwestern Orem, Utah. It is the home field of the Utah Valley Wolverines of the NCAA Division I Big West Conference.

== History ==
Originally known as Parkway Crossing Stadium, it was completed in 2005. The ballpark was a design-build project led by Utah Division of Facilities and Construction Management and built by R&O Construction. With seating for 2,500, the capacity is increased to over 5,000 with the incorporation of the grass berm seating. The ballpark overlooks Mt. Timpanogos beyond the outfield. Its facilities include indoor tunnels, weight rooms and offices for both teams. The ballpark serves as a shared facility for Utah Valley State University and the Orem Owlz. The Owls of the Pioneer League were an affiliate of the Los Angeles Angels, who had played the previous four seasons as the Provo Angels.

The stadium made its debut on March 24, 2005 with Utah Valley defeating Southern Utah 5-3. On June 13, 2007, the stadium was officially named Brent Brown Ballpark in honor of Brent Brown. Brent and Kim Brown and Ira and Mary Lou Fulton donated to Utah Valley to help pay the bond for the stadium. The new name was a source of dispute between the Orem Owlz and the University. The Owlz referred to the ballpark simply as "Home of the Owlz".

The name of the ballpark changed again on December 7, 2017 to UCCU Ballpark after Utah Community Credit Union obtained the naming rights of the ballpark for 10 years.

On March 23, 2020 DoTerra Field at UCCU Ballpark was unveiled. DoTerra had provided funds for a renovation of the facility that included an upgrade to the playing surface from natural grass to FieldTurf's DoublePlay system.

The Orem Owlz relocated to Windsor, Colorado in the fall of 2020.

== Dimensions ==
305 feet (93 m) down the left field line quickly angles to 427 feet (130 m) just left of dead center which is 408 feet (124 m). The right field gap is marked at 388 feet (118 m) and angles to 312 feet (95 m) down the right field line. The fence also varies in height: 20 feet (6.1 m) high down the left field line for approximately the first 90 feet (27 m) and then dropping to 10 feet (3.0 m) throughout the rest of the park. Though the short left and right field fences provide an advantage for hitters, the long distance to the rest of the park makes it difficult to hit home runs.

== Events ==
From May 22–26, 2012, the ballpark hosted the 2012 Great West Conference baseball tournament. Utah Valley won the tournament, finishing the season with a 29–0 Great West record. It is also occasionally used for concerts.

== See also ==
- List of NCAA Division I baseball venues
