= Houston Christian University =

Private university in Houston, Texas, US

Coordinates: 29.694°N 95.515°W

- Former names: Houston Baptist College (1960–1973); Houston Baptist University (1973–2022)
- Motto: John 14:6
- Type: Private university
- Established: 1960; 66 years ago
- Accreditation: SACSCOC
- Religious affiliation: Baptist General Convention of Texas
- Endowment: $132 million (2021)
- President: Vacant
- Provost: Stan Napper
- Faculty: 152 (2014)
- Administrative staff: 231 (2014)
- Students: 5,285 (2026)
- Undergraduates: 3,142 (2026)
- Postgraduates: 2,143 (2026)
- Location: Houston, Texas, U.S.
- Campus: 158 acres (64 ha); Urban
- Colors: Royal blue and orange
- Nickname: Huskies
- Sporting affiliations: NCAA Division I – Southland Conference
- Mascots: Wakiza III (Live), Mingo (Animated)
- Website: www.hc.edu

Houston Christian University (HCU), formerly Houston Baptist University (HBU), is a private university in Houston, Texas, United States. It is affiliated with the Baptist General Convention of Texas. Its Cultural Arts Center houses three museums: the Dunham Bible Museum, the Museum of American Architecture and Decorative Arts, and the Museum of Southern History.

The Houston Theological Seminary is one of the university's graduate schools that offers the Doctor of Ministry and Master of Divinity, among other degrees.

== History ==
The university was founded in 1960 by the Baptist General Convention of Texas as Houston Baptist College. In 1973, it became a university. University leaders announced a name change from Houston Baptist University to its current name in September 2022. From 2006 to 2026, the university's president was Robert B. Sloan.

== Campus ==
It is located in Sharpstown Section 3A, within the Southwest Management District (formerly Greater Sharpstown) in Houston, Texas, near the Southwest Freeway.

According to the Houston Convention and Visitors Bureau, the land housing HCU is in the Chinatown area.

=== Campus housing ===
The Reuben & Rebecca Bates Philips Residence Colleges for Men and Women are two separate residence hall facilities for freshmen, with each serving one gender. The Sadie & Doug Hodo Residence College is the largest single residential building on campus that houses both genders on opposite sides of the building. Husky Village, seven apartment buildings with various layouts, are usually reserved for the university and house mostly upper classmen and staff.

== Community life and worship ==
Eighty Community Life and Worship Credits (CLW Credits) are required for graduation from HBU. Transfer students are also allotted 0.75 CLW Credits for each credit hour transferred into the university. CLW Credits may be accrued from a variety of opportunities including: campus service, a weekly traditional chapel service known as Convocation, a weekly student-led contemporary worship service known as Quest, small group Bible studies, lecture series and through the Assisting Communities Through Students office which coordinates community service and volunteer work in the Houston community. The on-campus "Community Life and Worship" biyearly magazine lists the different opportunities through which students may earn CLW Credits. The spiritual life office also awards credits for students who participate in church or university sponsored mission trips.

The university received a Title IX exemption in 2017, which allows the university to legally discriminate against LGBT students on religious grounds. University president Robert Sloan has stated that special civil rights protections for people who engage in homosexuality are unnecessary because like "a tendency towards arson or theft" homosexuality is a sinful tendency that stems from a person's individual and therefore chosen "behavior".

== Athletics ==
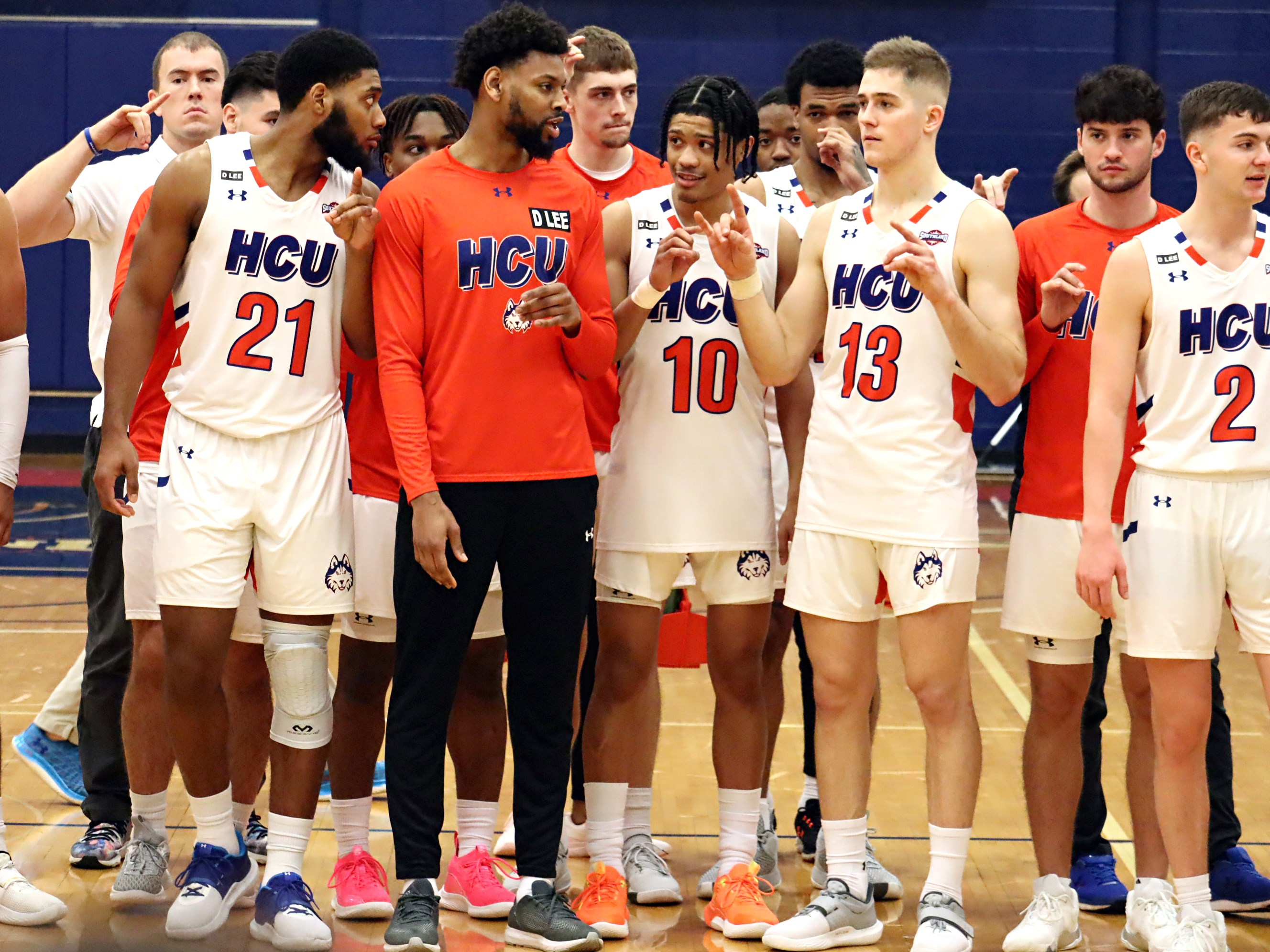
Members of the men's basketball team at Sharp Gymnasium in 2023

The Houston Christian athletic teams are called the Huskies. The university is a member of the Division I level of the National Collegiate Athletic Association (NCAA), primarily competing in the Southland Conference for most of its sports since the 2013–14 academic year, while its men's soccer team competes in the Ohio Valley Conference (OVC). The Huskies previously competed the D-I Great West Conference from 2008–09 to 2012–13 after spending one season as an NCAA D-I Independent during the 2007–08 school year (since returning back to NCAA D-I as a transitional member); in the Red River Athletic Conference (RRAC) of the National Association of Intercollegiate Athletics (NAIA) from 1998–99 to 2006–07; and as an NAIA Independent from 1989–90 to 1997–98. Houston Christian's (HCU) official school colors are royal blue and orange.

HCU competes in 17 intercollegiate varsity sports: Men's sports include baseball, basketball, cross country, football, golf, soccer and track and field (indoor and outdoor); while women's sports include basketball, beach volleyball, cross country, golf, soccer, softball, track and field (indoor and outdoor) and volleyball.

=== Football ===
Houston Christian's football program began in 2013. Former Huskies in the NFL include Caleb Johnson, Bailey Zappe, and Jalyx Hunt.

=== Baseball ===
The HCU baseball team participated in the 2025 NCAA Division I Baseball Tournament after winning the Southland Conference tournament championship series at home on Husky Field. The team advanced to the Austin Regional, hosted by the University of Texas. HCU baseball also won 2015 Southland Conference tournament championship in Sugar Land, Texas, and advanced to the NCAA Baseball Tournament's Houston Regional, hosted by the University of Houston. The Huskies also won the Great West Conference's final baseball championship at the 2013 GWC Baseball Tournament.

=== Women's soccer ===
The HCU women's soccer team participated in the 2014 NCAA Tournament, winning the Southland Conference tournament championship in Beaumont, Texas, before falling to No. 5 Texas A&M in the first round.

The HCU women's soccer team made their second appearance in the NCAA tournament in 2016 after winning the Southland Conference tournament championship in Corpus Christi, Texas. They fell to No. 1 Stanford in the first round.

=== Women's basketball ===
During the 2016 Southland Conference women's basketball tournament, senior Anna Strickland posted 21 points, 31 rebounds, eight assists, and seven blocked shots in the Huskies' first-round loss to Lamar University. Her 31 rebounds broke the Southland Conference single-game record, established a new tournament record, and were the most rebounds in Division I women's basketball in 2016. Strickland's all-around stat sheet has not been achieved in men's or women's Division I basketball or the NBA in the past twenty years.

=== Men's soccer ===
Two student athletes have earned CoSIDA Academic All-American status: volleyball's Allison Doerpinghaus and men's soccer's Bryan Brody. Both students earned the honor in 2015. They join numerous student-athletes who have earned CoSIDA Academic All-District and academic all-conference honors, and numerous Academic All-American at the NIAA level.

=== Achievements ===
Notable NCAA D-I athletic achievements:

- 1983 NCAA high-jump champion, Ricky Thompson; t-32nd place in the 1983 Track & Field Championships
- Alma Mater of European Tour great Colin Montgomerie
- 1983-84 Men's basketball team participated in the NCAA tournament in the play-in game vs. Alcorn State; 1983-84 Men's basketball team led the entire NCAA in team field-goal percentage, shooting 55.2% - this is also tenth all-time in NCAA history
- Participants in the NCAA men's golf championships in 1984, 1987 (5th place), and 1988
- Participants in the NCAA men's gymnastics championships in 1982 (10th place) and 1987 (7th place); 1987 men's gymnastics (Rings) champion, Paul O'Neill
- 1982, 83, 84, 85 Trans-America (now Atlantic Sun) Men's soccer Champions, and conference tournament champions in 82, 84, and 85
- 1982, 83, 84, 85 Trans-America (now Atlantic Sun) men's cross country champions; individual titles won by Charlie Foreman (83 & 84) and Magnus Fyhr (85)

Notable NAIA athletic achievements:

- 2007 NAIA Baseball World Series, third place; 2007 Baseball Region VI Champions
- Participants in NAIA Men's Basketball Tournament ten straight seasons from 1997 to 2007
- Dwight Jones II, son of Dwight Jones Sr. who played on the 1972 USA Olympic Silver medal basketball team in Munich, was drafted by the Tulsa 66ers of the NBA Developmental League as well as the East Kentucky Miners in the CBA draft

== Gallery ==
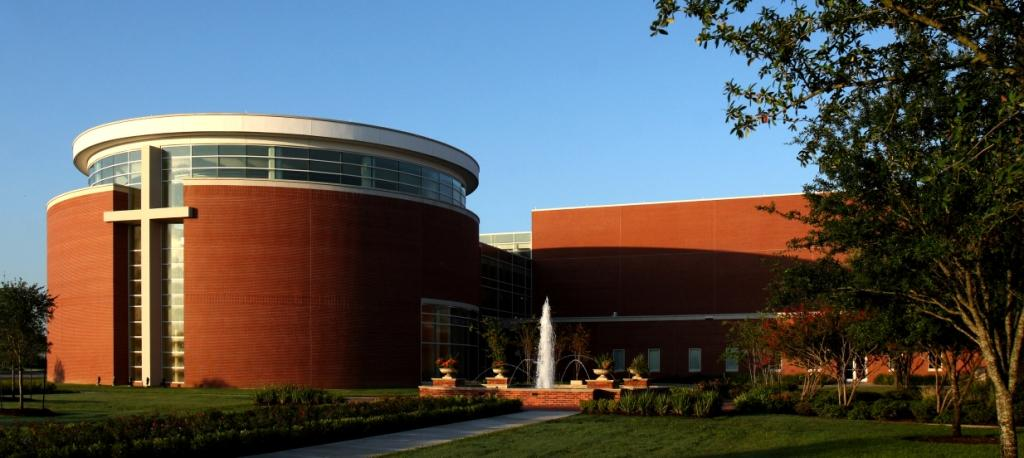
Morris Cultural Arts Center and Belin Chapel

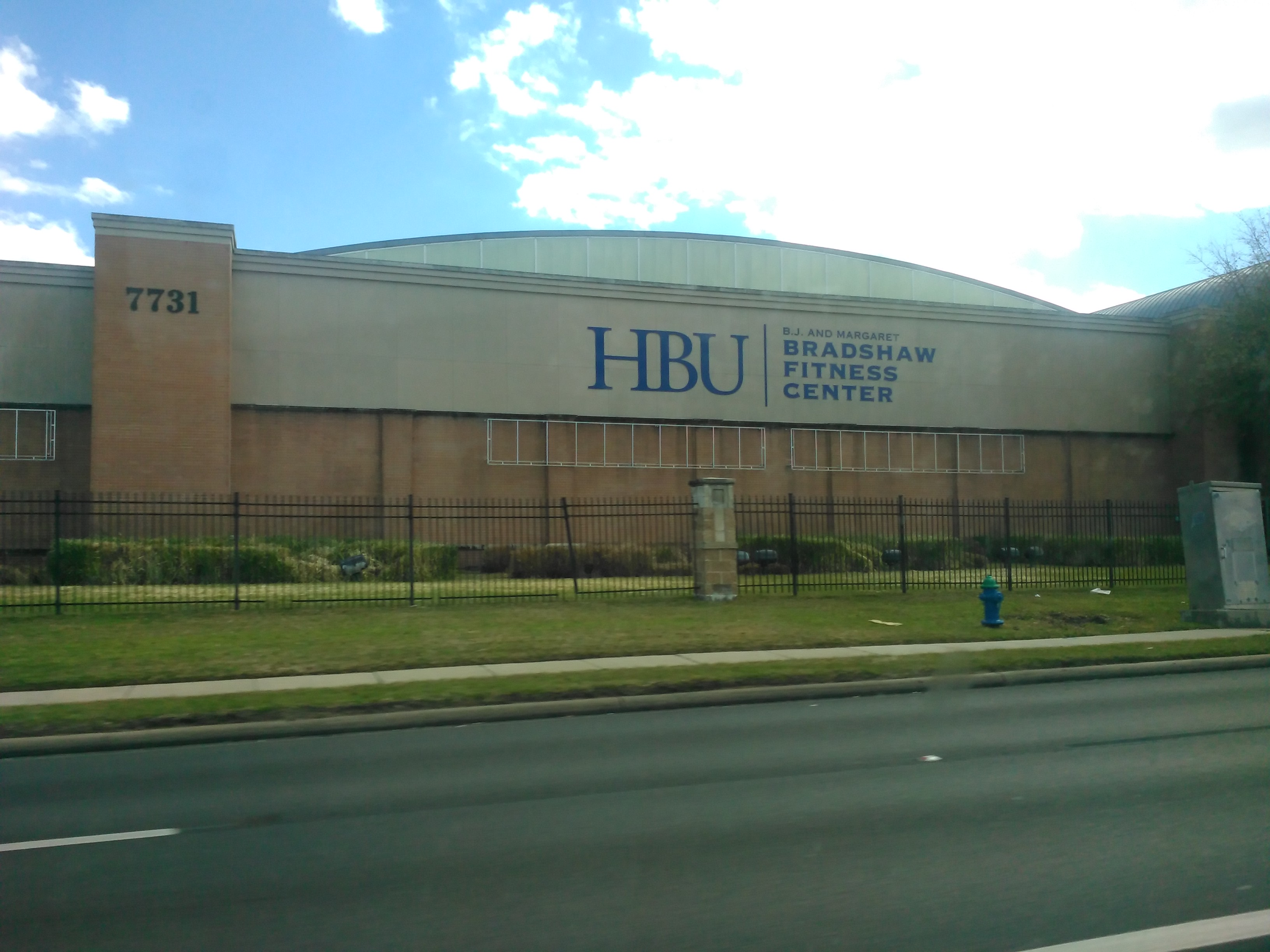
Athletic Center

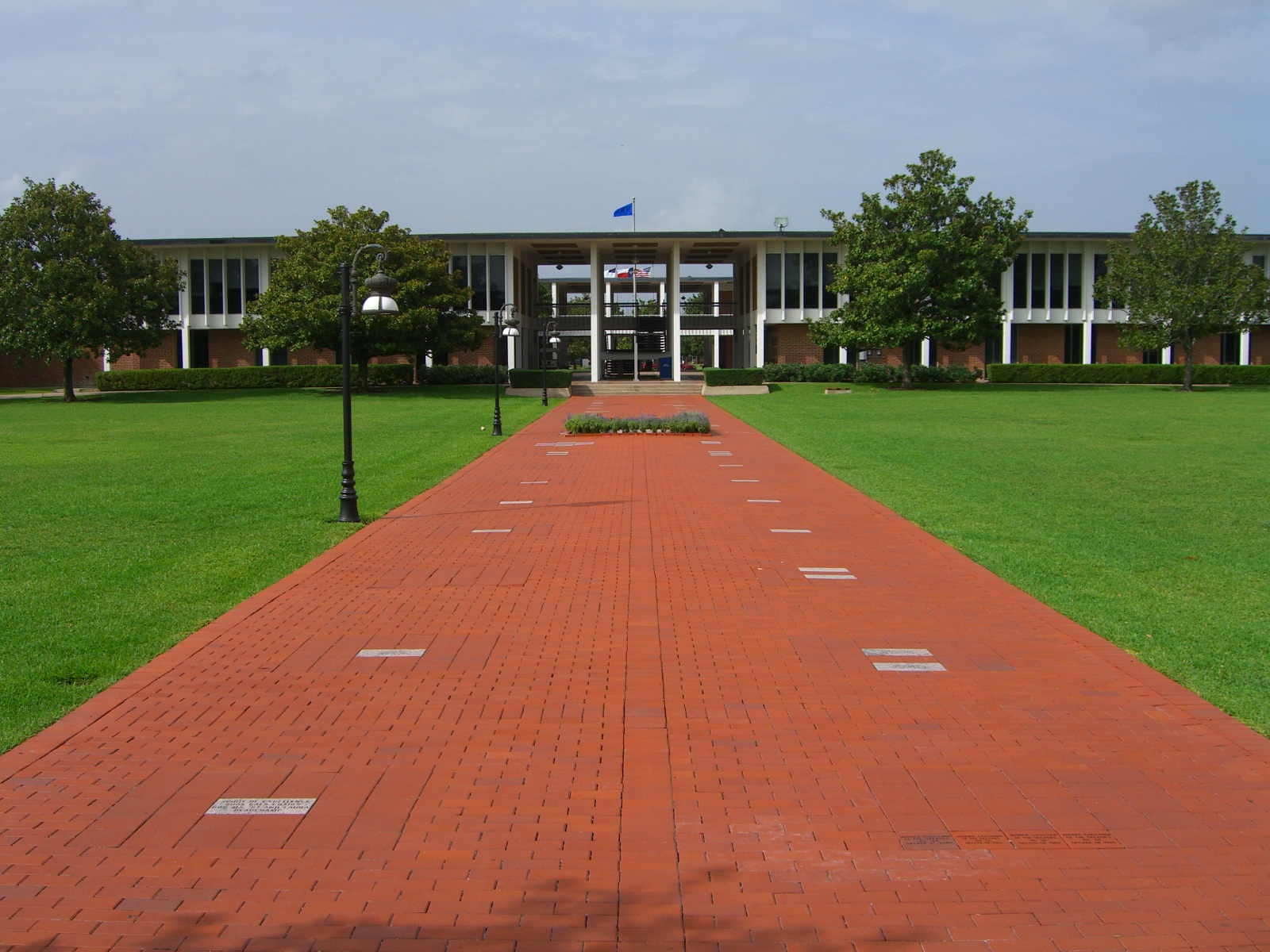
Brown Administrative Complex

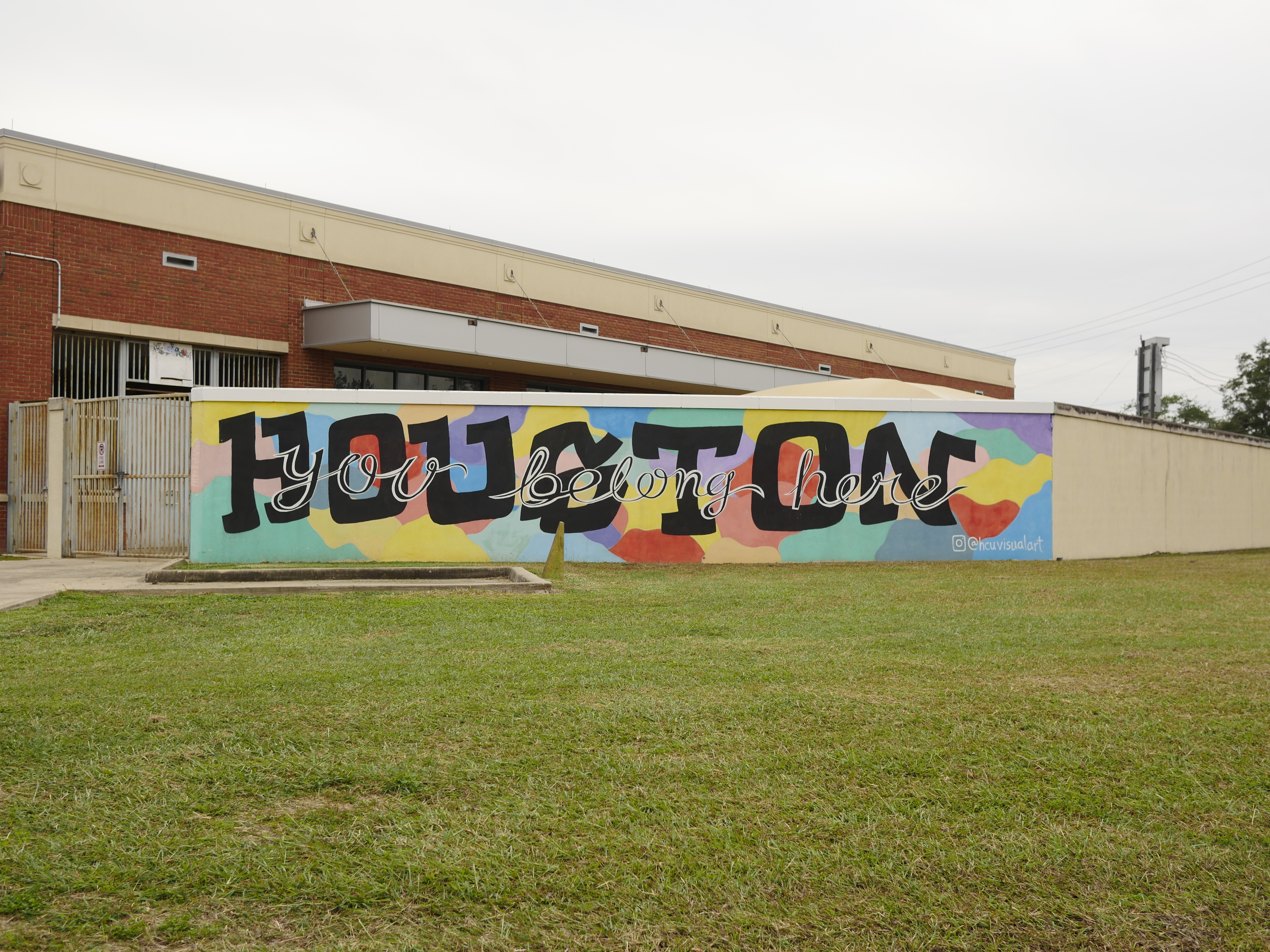
Smith Blvd Entrance Graffiti Mural

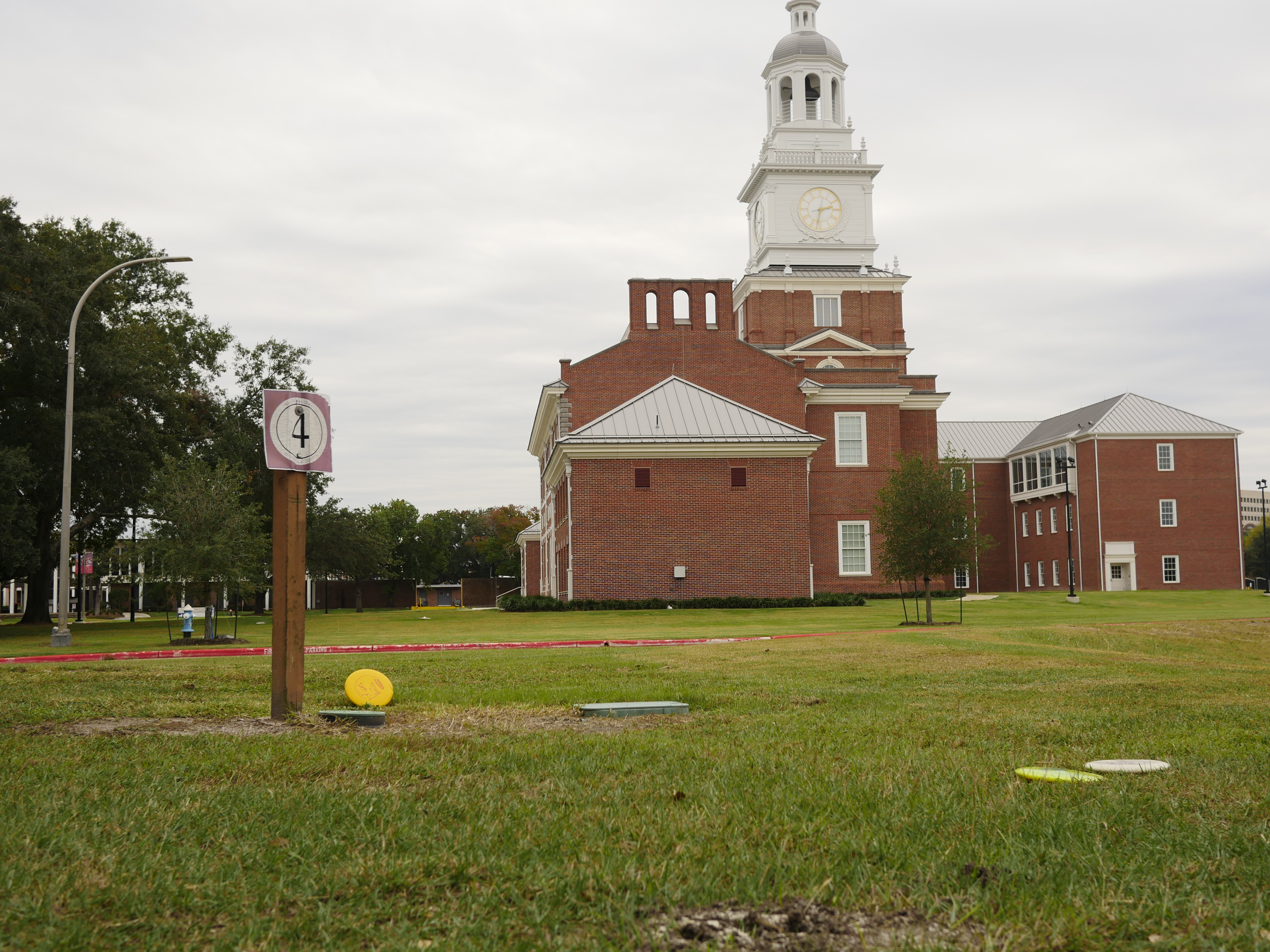
Husky Live Oaks, a 9-hole object disc golf course on campus

== Notable alumni ==
- Voddie Baucham, Jr., pastor, preacher, author, apologist, and Dean of Theology at African Christian University
- Van G. Garrett, poet
- Rubén González, Olympic luger and author
- Jalyx Hunt, professional football player
- Caleb Johnson, professional football player
- Colin Montgomerie, professional Golfer
- Elliot Segal, radio DJ (did not graduate)
- Jerreth Sterns, professional football player
- Bailey Zappe, professional football player
