= Cougar Stadium (Chicago State) =

Baseball venue in Chicago, Illinois, US

- Interactive map of Cougar Stadium
- Address: 9501 S. King Dr, Chicago, IL, US
- Coordinates: 41.715795°N 87.607479°W
- Owner: Chicago State University
- Operator: Chicago State University
- Surface: FieldTurf
- Scoreboard: Electronic

Construction
- Groundbreaking: 2012
- Built: 2012–2013
- Opened: 2014
- Cost: $2.5 million
- General contractor: K.R. Miller Contractors

Tenant
- Chicago State Cougars baseball (NCAA DI WAC) (2013–2020)

Cougar Stadium is a baseball venue in Chicago, Illinois, United States. It was home to the Chicago State Cougars baseball team of the NCAA Division I Western Athletic Conference until the baseball program was discontinued on June 23, 2020. The field hosted its first game on March 18, 2014.

== History ==
Construction began following the 2012 season, and the venue was scheduled to be completed for the start of the 2013 season. However, construction delays pushed back the field's completion to fall 2013.

On March 18, 2014, the Cougars lost 7–1 to Valparaiso in the stadiums first-ever game.

On June 23, 2020, Chicago State University's board of trustees approved the CSU Athletics FY21 Sports Sponsorship resolution proposed by its athletic department which discontinued the baseball program effective immediately.

== Features ==
The stadium features a press box, outdoor cages and stadium lighting.
