= 2015 Southland Conference baseball tournament =

- Teams: 8
- Format: Double-elimination
- Finals site: Constellation Field; Sugar Land, Texas
- Champions: Houston Baptist (1st title)
- Winning coach: Jared Moon (1 title)
- MVP: Curtis Jones (Houston Baptist)
- Television: ESPN3

2015 Southland Conference baseball standings
	Conf.						Overall
Team	W		L		T	PCT	W		L		T	PCT
Southeastern Louisiana ‍†‍‍	25	–	5	–	0	.833	42	–	17	–	0	.712
Northwestern State ‍‍‍	20	–	8	–	0	.714	31	–	23	–	0	.574
Nicholls State ‍‍‍	18	–	11	–	0	.621	34	–	19	–	1	.639
McNeese State ‍‍‍	18	–	12	–	0	.600	32	–	25	–	0	.561
Sam Houston State ‍‍‍	17	–	12	–	0	.586	31	–	28	–	0	.525
Central Arkansas ‍‍‍	16	–	14	–	0	.533	29	–	24	–	0	.547
Houston Baptist ‍‍‡‍^{y}	14	–	13	–	0	.519	28	–	27	–	0	.509
Texas A&M–Corpus Christi ‍‍‍	13	–	14	–	0	.481	26	–	27	–	0	.491
Abilene Christian * ‍‍‍	13	–	17	–	0	.433	17	–	38	–	0	.309
Stephen F. Austin ‍‍‍	11	–	18	–	0	.379	17	–	34	–	0	.333
Incarnate Word * ‍‍‍	11	–	19	–	0	.367	21	–	33	–	0	.389
Lamar ‍‍‍	10	–	19	–	0	.345	21	–	31	–	0	.404
New Orleans ‍‍‍	3	–	27	–	0	.100	14	–	40	–	0	.259
† – Conference champion ‡ – Tournament champion y – Invited to the NCAA tournament As of May 31, 2015; Rankings from Collegiate Baseball; *Ineligible for postseason play due to Division I transition

The 2015 Southland Conference baseball tournament was held from May 20 through 23. The top eight regular season finishers of the league's ten teams met in the double-elimination tournament held at Constellation Field in Sugar Land, Texas. The event returned to Sugar Land as part of a two season contract after one season on campus. The winner of the tournament, Houston Baptist, earns the conference's automatic bid to the 2015 NCAA Division I baseball tournament. Abilene Christian and Incarnate Word are ineligible for postseason play as they transition from Division II.

== Seeding and format ==
The top eight finishers from the regular season, not including Abilene Christian or Incarnate Word, were seeded one through eight. Seeding for the 2015 tournament was based on the order of finish in conference regular season play. No tie-breakers were needed, and teams ineligible for the 2015 tournament did not finish in the top eight. The teams played a two bracket, double–elimination tournament, with the winner of each bracket meeting in a single championship final.

== Results ==
First round
1	Southeastern Louisiana	2
8	Texas A&M–Corpus Christi	4
4	McNeese State	1
5	Sam Houston State	5
1	Southeastern Louisiana	3
4	McNeese State	2
3	Nicholls State	6
6	Central Arkansas	7
2	Northwestern State	1
7	Houston Baptist	4
3	Nicholls State	3
2	Northwestern State	4

Second round
8	Texas A&M–Corpus Christi	1
5	Sam Houston State	6
1	Southeastern Louisiana	5
8	Texas A&M–Corpus Christi	6*
7	Houston Baptist	6
6	Central Arkansas	1
2	Northwestern State	4
6	Central Arkansas	5

Semifinals
5	Sam Houston State	4	3
8	Texas A&M–Corpus Christi	6	2
7	Houston Baptist	1	–
6	Central Arkansas	0	–

Final
5	Sam Houston State	0
7	Houston Baptist	6

== Line scores ==
=== Day one ===
==== Game 1 (Central Arkansas vs Nicholls) ====
May 20, 2015 9:05 am CDT at Constellation Field, Sugar Land, TX
Team	1	2	3	4	5	6	7	8	9	R	H	E
Central Arkansas	1	0	0	1	0	1	0	2	2	7	11	2
Nicholls	0	1	0	0	0	0	1	0	4	6	13	5
WP: Gilmore, C. (8–3) LP: Borne, G. (6–5) Sv: Stitch, B. (6); Attendance: N/A

==== Game 2 (Houston Baptist vs Northwestern State) ====
May 20, 2015 12:30 pm CDT at Constellation Field, Sugar Land, TX
Team	1	2	3	4	5	6	7	8	9	R	H	E
Houston Baptist	0	0	0	0	0	1	0	1	2	4	7	0
Northwestern State	1	0	0	0	0	0	0	0	0	1	5	2
WP: McCollough (8–2) LP: Oller, A. (6–4) Sv: None; Attendance: N/A

==== Game 3 (Texas A&M–Corpus Christi vs Southeastern Louisiana) ====
May 20, 2015 4:00 pm CDT at Constellation Field, Sugar Land, TX
Team	1	2	3	4	5	6	7	8	9	R	H	E
Texas A&M–Corpus Christi	0	0	0	0	0	0	3	1	0	4	6	1
Southeastern Louisiana	0	1	1	0	0	0	1	0	0	2	5	3
WP: Belicek, T (9–4) LP: Scioneaux, T (9–3) Sv: Dorris, J (9); Attendance: N/A

==== Game 4 (Sam Houston State vs McNeese State) ====
May 21, 2015 7:05 pmCDT at Constellation Field, Sugar Land, TX
Team	1	2	3	4	5	6	7	8	9	R	H	E
Sam Houston State	0	5	0	0	0	0	0	0	0	5	11	3
McNeese State	0	0	0	0	0	0	0	0	1	1	8	0
WP: Godail, A. (5–6) LP: Fontenot, K. (7–4) Sv: None; Attendance: 1,511

=== Day two ===
==== Game 5 (Northwestern State vs Nicholls) ====
May 21, 2015 9:00 am CDT at Constellation Field, Sugar Land, TX
Team	1	2	3	4	5	6	7	8	9	R	H	E
Northwestern State	1	0	0	0	4	0	0	0	0	4	8	2
Nicholls	1	1	0	0	0	0	0	1	0	3	11	2
WP: Oller, J. (10–2) LP: Deemes, R. (5–4) Sv: Smith, B. (10); Attendance: 1,292

==== Game 6 (McNeese State vs Southeastern Louisiana) ====
May 21, 2015 12:22 pm CDT at Constellation Field, Sugar Land, TX
Team	1	2	3	4	5	6	7	8	9	10	11	12	R	H	E
McNeese State	0	0	0	0	0	0	2	0	0	0	0	0	2	11	0
Southeastern Louisiana	1	0	1	0	0	0	0	0	0	0	0	1	3	12	1
WP: Sceroler, M. (3–2) LP: Lapeze, C. (0–1) Sv: None; Attendance: 1,292

==== Game 7 (Central Arkansas vs Houston Baptist) ====
May 21, 2015 2:19 pm CDT at Constellation Field, Sugar Land, TX
Team	1	2	3	4	5	6	7	8	9	R	H	E
Central Arkansas	0	1	0	0	0	0	0	0	0	1	6	0
Houston Baptist	0	0	2	1	1	0	0	2	0	6	15	0
WP: Wright, T. (7–6) LP: Durham, C. (2–1) Sv: None; Attendance: 1,292

==== Game 8 (Texas A&M–Corpus Christi vs Sam Houston State) ====
May 21, 2015 2:19 pm CDT at Constellation Field, Sugar Land, TX
Team	1	2	3	4	5	6	7	8	9	R	H	E
Texas A&M–Corpus Christi	0	0	1	0	0	0	0	0	0	1	4	0
Sam Houston State	0	0	2	0	0	0	0	4	0	6	11	3
WP: Boyd, L. (6–4) LP: Danton, M (4–7) Sv: Bisacca, A. (4); Attendance: 1,292

=== Day three ===
==== Game 9 (Northwestern State vs Central Arkansas) ====
May 22, 2015 9:00 am CDT at Constellation Field, Sugar Land, TX
Team	1	2	3	4	5	6	7	8	9	R	H	E
Northwestern State	1	2	0	0	0	0	0	0	1	4	10	3
Central Arkansas	1	0	0	1	1	0	0	1	1	5	14	1
WP: Stitch, B. (5–5) LP: Duvic, H. (1–1) Sv: None; Attendance: 1,361

==== Game 10 (Southeastern Louisiana vs Texas A&M–Corpus Christi) ====
May 22, 2015 12:41 pm CDT at Constellation Field, Sugar Land, TX
Team	1	2	3	4	5	6	7	8	9	10	R	H	E
Southeastern Louisiana	1	2	1	0	0	0	1	0	0	0	5	8	4
Texas A&M–Corpus Christi	0	0	0	3	0	1	0	1	0	1	6	10	1
WP: Holland, N (2–1) LP: Granier, K. (4–2) Sv: None; Attendance: 1,361

==== Game 11 (Houston Baptist vs Central Arkansas) ====
May 22, 2015 4:13 pm CDT at Constellation Field, Sugar Land, TX
Team	1	2	3	4	5	6	7	8	9	R	H	E
Houston Baptist	0	0	0	0	0	1	0	0	0	1	6	1
Central Arkansas	0	0	0	0	0	0	0	0	0	0	4	0
WP: Kennell, R. (2–0) LP: Gray, T. (1–1) Sv: None; Attendance: 1,361

==== Game 12 (Sam Houston State vs Texas A&M–Corpus Christi) ====
May 22, 2015 7:00 pm CDT at Constellation Field, Sugar Land, TX
Team	1	2	3	4	5	6	7	8	9	R	H	E
Sam Houston State	0	0	1	0	0	2	0	0	1	4	8	1
Texas A&M–Corpus Christi	1	0	0	0	0	0	0	1	4	6	12	3
WP: Holland, N (3–1) LP: Brinley, R. (1–6) Sv: Dorris, J (10); Attendance: 1,361

=== Day four ===
==== Game "14" (Texas A&M–Corpus Christi vs Sam Houston State) ====
May 23, 2015 1:00 pm CDT at Constellation Field, Sugar Land, TX
Team	1	2	3	4	5	6	7	8	9	R	H	E
Texas A&M–Corpus Christi	0	0	1	1	0	0	0	0	0	2	7	3
Sam Houston State	0	0	0	0	0	0	1	0	1	3	7	1
WP: Bisacca, A. (7–2) LP: Belicek, T (9–5) Sv: None; Attendance: 1,421

==== Championship game (Houston Baptist vs Sam Houston State) ====
May 23, 2015 6:00 pm CDT at Constellation Field, Sugar Land, TX
Team	1	2	3	4	5	6	7	8	9	R	H	E
Sam Houston State	0	0	0	0	0	0	0	0	0	0	10	0
Houston Baptist	0	0	0	0	0	0	0	6	X	6	12	1
WP: Bisacca, A. (7–2) LP: Belicek, T (9–5) Sv: None; Attendance: 1,421

== Awards and honors ==
Tournament MVP: Curtis Jones – Houston Baptist

All–Tournament Teams:

- Greg Espiosna – Houston Baptist
- Andrew Alvarez – Houston Baptist
- Clay Thomas – Houston Baptist
- Jake MacWillians – Sam Houston State
- Hayden Simerly – Sam Houston State
- Bryce Johnson – Sam Houston State
- Andrew Godail – Sam Houston State
- Zacarias Hardy – Texas A&M–Corpus Christi
- Brett Burner – Texas A&M–Corpus Christi
- Ty Tice – Central Arkansas
- Carson Crites – Southeastern Louisiana

== See also ==
2015 Southland Conference softball tournament
