= 2013 Great West Conference baseball tournament =

- Teams: 8
- Format: Double-elimination
- Finals site: Bears & Eagles Riverfront Stadium; Newark, NJ
- Champions: Houston Baptist (1st title)
- Winning coach: Jared Moon (1st title)
- MVP: Luke Clements (Houston Baptist)

2013 Great West Conference baseball standings
	Conf.						Overall
Team	W		L		T	PCT	W		L		T	PCT
Northern Colorado ‍†‍‍	20	–	7	–	0	.741	33	–	24	–	0	.579
Houston Baptist ‍‍‡‍	17	–	10	–	0	.630	34	–	24	–	1	.585
Texas-Pan American ‍‍‍	17	–	10	–	0	.630	28	–	30	–	0	.483
Utah Valley ‍‍‍	15	–	9	–	0	.625	24	–	30	–	0	.444
North Dakota ‍‍‍	13	–	11	–	0	.542	25	–	22	–	1	.531
NJIT ‍‍‍	11	–	16	–	0	.407	20	–	34	–	0	.370
NYIT ‍‍‍	8	–	20	–	0	.286	10	–	47	–	0	.175
Chicago State ‍‍‍	5	–	23	–	0	.179	10	–	45	–	0	.182
† – Conference champion ‡ – Tournament champion As of June 1, 2013; Rankings from Collegiate Baseball

The 2013 Great West Conference baseball tournament was held from May 21 through 25. All eight of the league's teams met in the double-elimination tournament held at new Jersey Institute of Technology's Bears & Eagles Riverfront Stadium in Newark, New Jersey. As the Great West is a new conference, the league does not have an automatic bid to the 2013 NCAA Division I baseball tournament. Third seeded Houston Baptist won their first championship, ending Utah Valley's run of three consecutive titles dating to the event's inception.

== Seeding and format ==
All eight teams were seeded based on conference winning percentage only and then met in a double-elimination bracket.

Team	W	L	Pct.	GB	Seed
Northern Colorado	20	7	.741	–	1
Texas–Pan American	17	10	.640	3	2
Houston Baptist	17	10	.630	3	3
Utah Valley	15	9	.625	3.5	4
North Dakota	13	11	.542	5.5	5
NJIT	11	16	.407	9	6
NYIT	8	20	.286	12.5	7
Chicago State	5	23	.179	15	8

== Results ==
Upper round 1	Upper round 2	Upper final	Final
1	Northern Colorado	13
8	Chicago State	1
1	Northern Colorado	3
5	North Dakota	11
4	Utah Valley	7
5	North Dakota	8
5	North Dakota	4
3	Houston Baptist	8
3	Houston Baptist	11
6	NJIT	6
3	Houston Baptist	3
2	Texas-Pan American	1
2	Texas–Pan American	7
7	NYIT	6	3	Houston Baptist	13
1	Northern Colorado	3
Lower round 1	Lower round 2	Lower round 3	Lower final
2	Texas-Pan American	1
8	Chicago State	3	8	Chicago State	4	5	North Dakota	8
4	Utah Valley	2	1	Northern Colorado	11	1	Northern Colorado	11
8	Chicago State	7
1	Northern Colorado	4
6	NJIT	9	6	NJIT	2
7	NYIT	6

== All-Tournament team ==
The following players were named to the All-Tournament team.

Name	School
Luke Clements	Houston Baptist
Tyler Hoelscher	Houston Baptist
C. J. Jarvis	Houston Baptist
Curtis Jones	Houston Baptist
Jake Gonzalez	Houston Baptist
Andrew Wellwerts	Chicago State
Mattingly Romanin	Chicago State
Tom Bouck	NJIT
Jeff Campbell	North Dakota
Jacob Threlkeld	North Dakota
Nick Miller	Northern Colorado
Jensen Park	Northern Colorado
Jake Johnson	Northern Colorado
Dusten Knight	Texas–Pan American

=== Most Valuable Player ===
Luke Clements was named Tournament Most Valuable Player. Clements was an outfielder for Houston Baptist.
