= Harold Kraft Memorial Field =

Baseball venue in North Dakota, US

- Interactive map of Harold Kraft Memorial Field
- Location: 2511 17th Avenue South, Grand Forks, North Dakota, US
- Coordinates: 47.901401°N 97.063646°W
- Owner: Grand Forks Park District
- Operator: Grand Forks Park District
- Capacity: 2,000
- Surface: FieldTurf (2011-present)
- Scoreboard: Electronic

Construction
- Renovated: 2011

Tenants
- North Dakota Fighting Hawks baseball (D-I WAC); Red River High School; Red River Pilots (Expedition League 2022-2022

Harold Kraft Memorial Field is a baseball venue in Grand Forks, North Dakota, United States. It was home to the North Dakota Fighting Hawks baseball team of the Western Athletic Conference in NCAA Division I. It is named for Harold Kraft, former coach of the North Dakota baseball program who revived the program in 1956 after it had been discontinued in 1921. Kraft coached the program from 1956 to 1981. It has a capacity of 2,000 spectators. On April 12, 2016, the University of North Dakota announced it will be dropping its baseball program after the 2016 season due to budget cuts.

== Features ==
A FieldTurf surface was installed in 2011, allowing for play in a wider range of weather conditions. The venue also features dugouts, bullpens, batting cages, and evergreen trees lining the outfield fence. Its seating areas include a main grandstand behind home plate, bleachers down the first base line, and a viewing deck down the third base line. It also has a press box, restrooms, and concessions.

Kraft Field, 1996

Kraft Field, 1996

== Other uses ==
2021 will see the debut of the Expedition League at Kraft Field, as the Wheat City Whiskey Jacks from Brandon, Manitoba will be relocated due to the border closure.

In addition to North Dakota baseball, the field has hosted the 2011 Great West Conference baseball tournament and the 1992 and 2004 North Central Conference Baseball Tournament. The baseball teams of Red River High School, next to whose campus the field is located, and Grand Forks Central High School also uses the field.

== See also ==
- List of NCAA Division I baseball venues
