= Michael Cole (footballer, born 1937) =

English footballer

Personal information
- Full name: Michael Edward Cole
- Date of birth: 9 June 1937 (age 89)
- Place of birth: Ilford, England
- Position: Full-back

Senior career*
Years	Team	Apps	(Gls)
- Harwich & Parkeston
1955–1958	Norwich City	3	(0)
1958–1960	Chelmsford City	23	(0)
1960–1962	Biggleswade Town		
- Lowestoft Town
- * Club domestic league appearances and goals

Michael Edward Cole (born 9 June 1937) is an English former footballer who played as a full-back.

== Career ==
Cole began his career at non-league club Harwich & Parkeston, before joining Norwich City in 1955. Cole remained with the club for three years, making three Football League appearances. In 1958, Cole joined Chelmsford City. After 33 appearances in all competitions for Chelmsford across two seasons, Cole signed for Biggleswade Town in 1960. In 1962, Cole joined Lowestoft Town.
