= North Dakota Fighting Hawks baseball =

American College baseball team

- Founded: 1901
- Defunct: 2016
- University: University of North Dakota
- Location: Grand Forks, North Dakota
- Home stadium: Harold Kraft Memorial Field (Capacity: 2,000)
- Nickname: Fighting Hawks
- Colors: Kelly green and white

College World Series appearances
- Division II: 1993

NCAA tournament appearances
- Division II: 1967, 1993, 2004

Conference regular season champions
- 1962, 1967, 1992 (division), 2004

The North Dakota Fighting Hawks baseball team was a part of the athletic program at the University of North Dakota in Grand Forks, North Dakota.

== History ==
The team was a member of the NCAA Division I Western Athletic Conference. It played at Harold Kraft Memorial Field. The last head coach was Jeff Dodson. The public address announcer for the baseball team was Kris Holm.

Announced April 12, 2016, as a part of expense reductions because of institution and statewide budget cuts, the University of North Dakota announced the baseball program would be discontinued at the end of their 2015–16 season.

On May 3, 2023, Zach Muckenhirn, who played for UND from 2014 to 2016, made his Major League Baseball (MLB) debut against the Detroit Tigers, becoming the first player in UND history to play in the major leagues.

== Head coaches ==
#	Name	Term
1	John Blair	1901–1902
2	Walter Hempel	1903
3	David Boise	1904
4	John "Chick" Commy	1905–1907
5	Harry Kyllo	1908–1909
6	David L. Dunlap	1910
7	John "Chick" Commy	1911
8	Henry "Doc" O'Keefe	1912
9	John Ellory	1913
10	Harry Wells	1914
11	Any Gill	1915–1916
12	No team	1921–1955
13	Harold C. "Pinky" Kraft	1956–1981
14	Terry Hjelmstad	1982–1983
15	Brian Kraft	1984–1988
16	Joe Serratore	1989
17	Gene Roebuck	1990–1993
18	Kelvin Ziegler	1994–2007
19	Timm Pint*	2007–2008
20	Jeff Dodson	2009–2016

== Stadiums ==
- Harold Kraft Memorial Field
