= Chicago State Cougars =

Collegiate athletic program based in Chicago

- University: Chicago State University
- Nickname: Cougars
- NCAA: Division I
- Conference: Northeast Conference; FCS Independent
- Athletic director: Dr. Monique Carroll
- Location: Chicago, Illinois
- Varsity teams: 16 (7 men's and 9 women's)
- Football stadium: SeatGeek Stadium (Bridgeview)
- Basketball arena: Emil and Patricia Jones Convocation Center
- Baseball stadium: Cougar Stadium (defunct NCAA venue as of June 23, 2020)
- Other venues: Dickens Athletic Center (volleyball)
- Colors: Green and white
- Website: www.gocsucougars.com
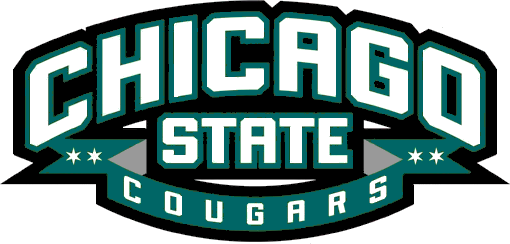

The Chicago State Cougars are the varsity athletic teams representing Chicago State University on the South Side of Chicago, Illinois in intercollegiate athletics. The university currently sponsors 16 varsity teams. The Cougars compete in NCAA Division I in the Northeast Conference (NEC), which they joined in 2024. They were previously members of the Western Athletic Conference from 2013 to 2022.

== History ==
Melvin Bland was the first CSU student athlete to gain NAIA All-American status in 1974 as a wrestler. Tyrone Everhart also was a NAIA Honorable Mention All-American wrestler the same year. Fred Evans as a sophomore became the first black swimmer ever to win a national championship in 1975. The Chicago State University Ice Hockey Team produced 2 NCAA Division 2 All-Americans in the 1975–76 season. George Hansen and Bob Janecyk were selected in 1975–76 to the NCAA (College Division) West All-American Team. Janecyk was selected two more times designated as an NCAA (College Division) West All-American Team goaltender for CSU in 1976–77 and 1977–78. He went on to play for the Chicago Blackhawks of the National Hockey League. The first NAIA District #20 Championship Team in any sport was the 1975 wrestling team, which captured the NAIA District #20 Championship coached by Dr. James G. Pappas. The Cougar Wrestling Team also won District #20 titles in 1976, 1977, 1978, 1979 and 1980.

In 1984, the CSU Men's Basketball Team captured third place at the NAIA National Championships. The team's performance throughout the tournament was as follows:

- Chicago State 79, Franklin Pierce (N.H.) 62
- Chicago State 105, Kearney State (Neb.) 104 2OT
- Chicago State 68, Chaminade (Hawaii) 66 (Quarterfinals)
- Fort Hays State (Kan.) 86, Chicago State 84 OT (Semifinals)
- Chicago State 86, Westmont (Calif.) 82 OT (3rd)

In 2024, the Women's Tennis Team earned a share of the Horizon League regular season championship and won the conference tournament. The team's performance throughout the tournament was as follows:

- Chicago State 4 Oakland 2 (QF)
- Chicago State 4 Youngstown State 2 (SF)
- Chicago State 4 Cleveland State 2 (F)

This was the first time in school history that any Chicago State team won the conference championship and qualified for a first round NCAA appearance, losing to Michigan in said round.

Chicago State joined the Western Athletic Conference on July 1, 2013 as part of a six-university expansion. Along with the University of Missouri–Kansas City (UMKC), it was to have anchored the circuit's Midwest division. UMKC left the conference in 2020 and Chicago State announced on January 14, 2021 that it would do likewise on June 30, 2022.

Chicago State is being integrated into Northeast Conference (NEC) athletic schedules beginning with the 2024-25 academic year. The Cougars will gain immediate eligibility to participate in all NEC championships and earn the conference's automatic qualifier to NCAA Championships. This comes after the MEAC presidents voted against adding Chicago State to the conference.

== Conference affiliations ==
- 1966–67 to 1976–77 – NAIA Independent
- 1977–78 to 1980–81 – Chicagoland Collegiate Athletic Conference
- 1981–82 to 1983–84 – NAIA Independent
- 1984–85 to 1992–93 – NCAA Division I Independent
- 1993–94 – East Coast Conference
- 1994–95 to 2005–06 – Mid-Continent Conference
- 2006–07 to 2008–09 – NCAA Division I Independent
- 2009–10 to 2012–13 – Great West Conference
- 2013–14 to 2021–22 – Western Athletic Conference
- 2022–23 to 2023–24 – NCAA Division I Independent
- 2024–25 to present – Northeast Conference

== Sports sponsored ==
Men's sports	Women's sports
Basketball	Basketball
Cross country	Cross country
Football (2026 debut)	Golf
Golf	Soccer
Soccer	Tennis
Tennis	Track and field^{†}
Track and field^{†}	Triathlon
	Volleyball
† = Track and field includes both indoor and outdoor.

With the school's current financial situation and the needs of the athletic program, in April 2016, the University Budget Committee recommended that the Athletic Department "... study the benefits of being Division 1 or another division." Chicago State University currently sponsors teams in seven men's and nine women's teams in NCAA sanctioned sports.

In 2023, CSU began a fundraising campaign to expand its sports offerings, including the potential addition of Division I FCS football. The first sport added as a result of this campaign was women's triathlon, part of the NCAA Emerging Sports for Women program, in 2024–25. On February 11, 2025, CSU announced it had begun a search for its first head football coach, ultimately hiring Bobby Rome II that April. The first season is expected to be in 2026.

== All-Americans ==
- 1974 – Vince Williams – All-American – 6th 220yd Dash Outdoor Track & Field
- 1974 – Sudie Davis, Vince Williams, Willie Patton, Clifford Fletcher, Wallace Hunter All-Americans NCAA Track and Field
- 1974 – Melvin Bland – All-American – Third Team Wrestling
- 1975 – Fred Evans – All-American – Men's Swimming & Diving
- 1976 – Fred Evans – All-American – Men's Swimming & Diving
- 1976 – Scott White – All-American – Men's Swimming & Diving
- 1977 – Fred Evans – All-American – Men's Swimming & Diving
- 1977 – John Ebito – All-American – Men's Swimming & Diving
- 1978 – Ken Cyrus – All-American – Second Team Men's Basketball
- 1979 – Chandler Mackey – All-American – Wrestling
- 1979 – Joseph Curtis – All-American – Men's Indoor Track & Field
- 1979 – Joseph Curtis – All-American – Men's Outdoor Track & Field
- 1979 – Mike Eversley – All-American – Second Team Men's Basketball
- 1980 – Chandler Mackey – All-American – Wrestling
- 1980 – Derrick Hardy – All-American – Wrestling
- 1980 – Ken Dancy – All-American – Second Team Men's Basketball
- 1981 – Eric Blackmon – All-American – Men's Swimming & Diving
- 1983 – Jon Jahnke Academic – All-American – Baseball
- 1983 – Sherrod Arnold – All-American – First Team Men's Basketball
- 1983 – Stanley Griffin – All-American – First Team Men's Outdoor Track & Field
- 1984 – Charles Perry – All-Tournament Team – First Team Men's Basketball
- 1984 – Denise Bullocks – All-American – Women's Outdoor Track & Field
- 1984 – Denise Bullocks – Outstanding Performer – Women's Outdoor Track & Field
- 1984 – Denise Bullocks – Scholar-Athlete – Women's Outdoor Track & Field
- 1984 – Learando Drake – All-American – Third Team Men's Basketball
- 1984 – Lionel Keys – All-American – Wrestling
- 1986 – Jimmy McGriff – All-American – Men's Indoor Track & Field
- 1987 – Chris Garrett – All-American – Men's Outdoor Track & Field
- 1987 – David Rogan – All-American – Men's Indoor Track & Field
- 1987 – David Rogan – All-American – Men's Outdoor Track & Field
- 1987 – Deanail Mitchell – All-American – Men's Indoor Track & Field
- 1987 – Deanail Mitchell – All-American – Men's Outdoor Track & Field
- 1987 – Denise Bullocks – All-American – Women's Indoor Track & Field
- 1987 – Denise Bullocks – All-American – Women's Outdoor Track & Field
- 1987 – Enos Watts – All-American – Men's Outdoor Track & Field

== Notable former athletes ==
- Deji Akindele, professional basketball player for Yalova Group BelediyeSpor of the Turkish Basketball First League.
- Darron Brittman, former basketball player who is best known as the first officially recognized NCAA Division I season steals leader in 1985–86.
- Josephine D'Angelo, left fielder who played from 1943 through 1944 in the All-American Girls Professional Baseball League. She later earned her masters from CSU.
- James "Chico" Hernandez, FIAS World Cup Vice-Champion in Sombo Wrestling. He graduated from CSU.
- David Holston, basketball player for JDA Dijon Basket of France's LNB Pro A. He played for the Chicago State Cougars men's basketball team.
- Bob Janecyk, goaltender for the Chicago Blackhawks from 1983 to 1984 and the Los Angeles Kings from 1984 to 1989. He played for CSU and graduated in 1978.
- John Mallee, Major League Baseball hitting coach. Mallee is with the Los Angeles Angels. He attended CSU.
- Wayne Molis, professional basketball player who played for the New York Knicks from 1966-1967. He played for the Chicago State Cougars men's basketball team.
- Royce Parran, professional basketball player who last played for Belfius Mons-Hainaut of the Belgian Basketball League. He played for the Chicago State Cougars men's basketball team.
- Clarke Rosenberg (born 1993), American-Israeli basketball player in the Israel Basketball Premier League
- Tony Weeden, professional basketball player. He played for the Chicago State Cougars men's basketball team.
- Willye White, first American track and field athlete to take part in five Olympics, competing on the 1956, 1960, 1964, 1968, and 1972 teams respectively. She graduated from CSU in 1976 with a degree in public health administration.
