= Houston Christian Huskies baseball =

- 2026 Houston Christian Huskies baseball team
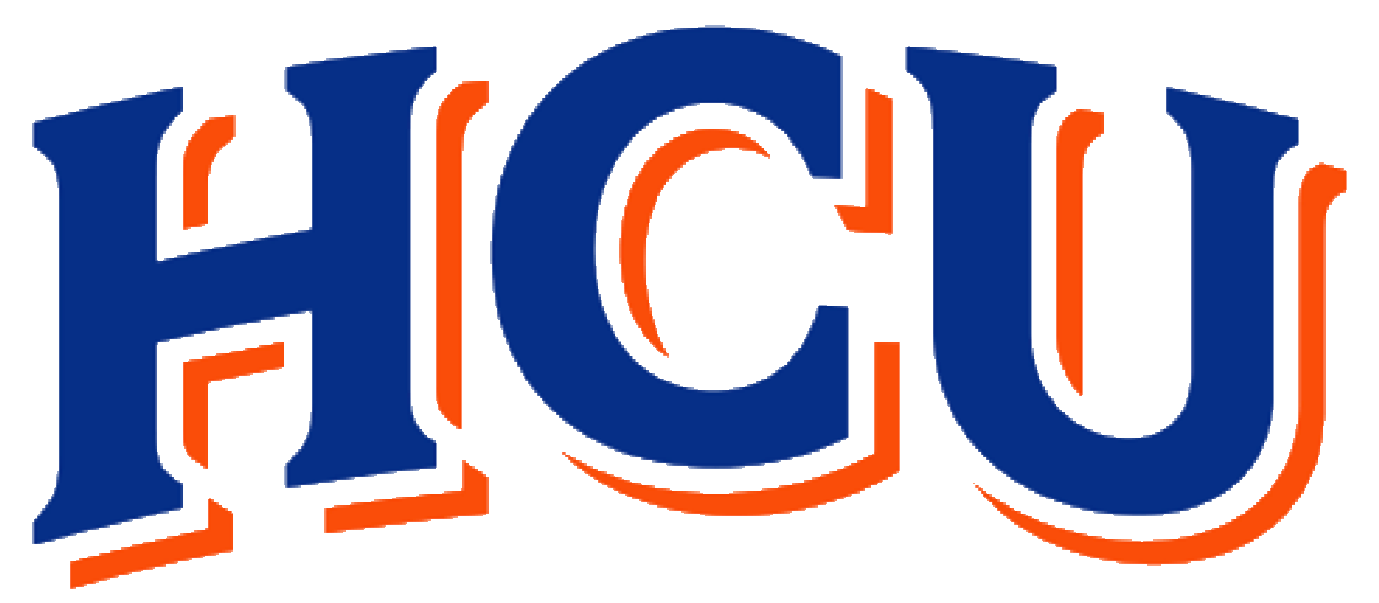
- Founded: 1964, 1990
- University: Houston Christian University
- Head coach: Clay VanderLaan (2nd season)
- Conference: Southland
- Location: Houston, Texas
- Home stadium: Husky Field (capacity: 500)
- Nickname: Huskies
- Colors: Royal blue and orange

College World Series appearances
- NAIA: 2007

NCAA tournament appearances
- 2015, 2025

Conference tournament champions
- NAIA: NAIA District 8: 1969; Red River: 1999, 2000, 2001, 2002, 2004, 2005, 2006; NCAA DI: Great West: 2013; Southland: 2015, 2025

Conference regular season champions
- NAIA: Big State: 1997; Red River: 1999, 2000, 2001, 2002, 2004, 2005, 2006, 2007

The Houston Christian Huskies baseball team, known as the Houston Baptist Huskies until 2022, is a varsity intercollegiate athletic team of Houston Christian University in Houston, Texas, United States. The team is a member of the Southland Conference, which is part of the National Collegiate Athletic Association's Division I. The team plays its home games at Husky Field in Houston, Texas. The Huskies are currently coached by Clay VanderLaan.

== History ==
The Huskies baseball team's first stint was from 1964-1970. The team was idle from 1971 to 1989 before returning in the spring of 1990, competing in the sport in every season since.

=== NAIA years ===
The Huskies competed at the NAIA level from 1966 to 1969 and again from 1990 to 2007. The team played as an NAIA independent twelve of those seasons (1966-1969, 1990-1996, and 1998). Ray Zaragoza threw a seven-inning perfect game in the first game of a home doubleheader against Bishop College on April 27, 1968. In 1969, the Huskies played in the 1969 NAIA Area II Area Tournament, going 1-2. They also competed in the Big State conference for one season (1997) winning the conference championship. The Huskies competed in the Red River Athletic Conference for the final nine seasons (1999–2007) as an NAIA member winning the RRAC conference championship eight of the nine seasons (1999, 2000, 2001, 2002, 2004, 2005, 2006, 2007) and the RRAC conference tournament championship seven times (1999, 2000, 2001, 2002, 2004, 2005, 2006).

=== NCAA Division I years ===
In 2008, Houston Baptist transitioned to Division I (NCAA) competing as an independent for the first two seasons at the Division I level. From 2010 to 2013, the Huskies competed in the Great West Conference winning the conference tournament championship in 2013. The team was a finalist in the 2011 and 2012 conference tournaments. Houston Baptist University became a member of the Southland Conference before the start of the 2013–14 season. The Huskies won the Southland Conference Baseball Tournament in their second season as an SLC member. In winning the tournament, the Huskies won the SLC auto-bid to the NCAA Division I baseball tournament. The 2015 NCAA Division I baseball tournament marked the Huskies' first appearance in the tournament. They also qualified for the 2025 NCAA Division I baseball tournament. The program's 1,000th win in the modern era came on March 13, 2026, in a 7–6 victory at Tarleton State.

== Facilities ==
The Huskies (known as the Spartans prior to the conclusion of the 1965 season) split their 1965 home games between Andy Anderson Field in Memorial Park and the new HBC Diamond. HBC Diamond was the home for Houston Baptist Baseball until the program's first stint ended in 1970 and part of right field became the site of a then-future shopping center. The location of HBC Diamond was directly northeast of Sharp Gym on what is now a Houston Christian University-owned shopping center.

Houston Baptist Baseball played at nearby Bayland Park from 1990-1992.

The Huskies opened Husky Field in 1993 and continue to play at the venue as of 2026. Construction began on a 7,200 square-foot indoor training facility behind the right field line in September 2022 which has since been completed. Lights were installed around the venue in time for the 2025 season. The first night game took place on February 14, 2025, in the second game of a doubleheader against Central Michigan.

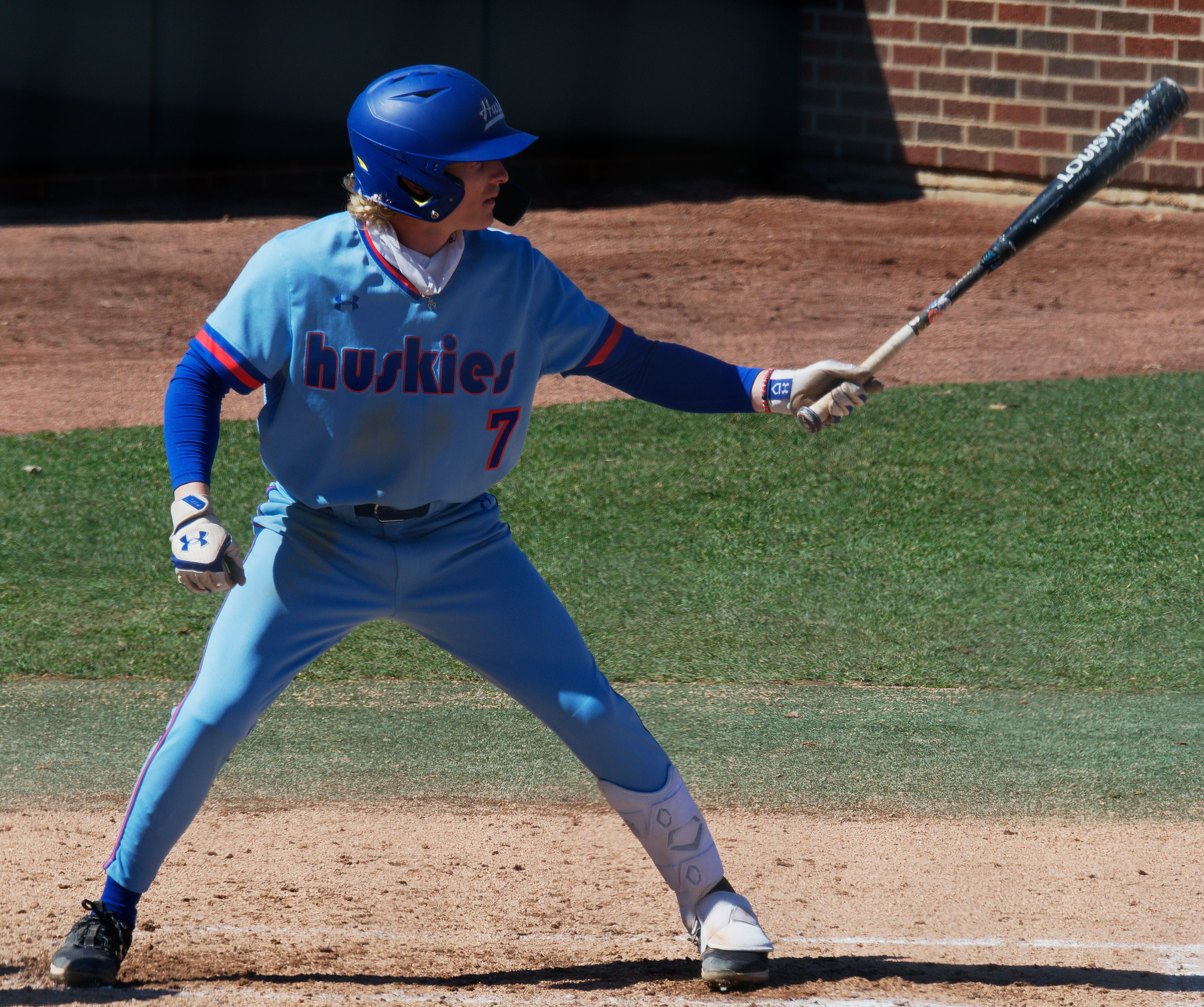
A Huskies baseball player during a 2022 game at Drayton McLane Baseball Stadium at John H. Kobs Field

== Houston Christian career coaching records ==
Coach	Number of Seasons	Overall record	Winning percentage
Coaching records
Rickey Witt	3	29–119	.196
Rusty Pendergrass	5	177–92	.658
Brian Huddleston	8	305–143–1	.680
Jared Moon	16	401–441–2	.476
Lance Berkman	3	47–104	.311
Clay VanderLaan	2	56—54	.509
Overall	37	1,015–953–3	.516

(Records reflect game results through the conclusion of the 2026 season. This does not include the program's original stint from 1964—1970)

== Year-by-year results ==
Information Source:

Year-by-Year Results
Year	Coach	Record	Conference Record	Conference	Notes
Junior College
Independent
1964	Kandie Risenhoover		–	Independent	
1965	Peck Vass		–	Independent	
NAIA
Independent
1966	Peck Vass		–	Independent	
1967	Peck Vass		–	Independent	
1968	Lonnie Richards		–	Independent	
1969	Lonnie Richards		–	Independent	NAIA District 8 Postseason Champions; NAIA Area II Tournament (1–2)
NCAA College Division
Independent
1970	Lonnie Richards	2-22	–	Independent	
NAIA
Independent
1990	Rickey Witt	4–40	–	Independent	
1991	Rickey Witt	11–40	–	Independent	
1992	Rickey Witt	14–39	–	Independent	
1993	Rusty Pendergrass	23–23	–	Independent	
1994	Rusty Pendergrass	39–16	–	Independent	
1995	Rusty Pendergrass	48–9	–	Independent	
Big State Conference
1996	Rusty Pendergrass	37–18	15–0	Big State	Champions
Independent
1997	Rusty Pendergrass	30–26	–	Independent	
1998	Brian Huddleston	26–26	–	Independent	
Red River Athletic Conference
1999	Brian Huddleston	40–19	15–0	RRAC	Regular season champions tournament champions
2000	Brian Huddleston	43–16	12–3	RRAC	Regular season champions tournament champions
2001	Brian Huddleston	34–23	9–0	RRAC	Regular season champions tournament champions
2002	Brian Huddleston	40–17	12–0	RRAC	Regular season champions tournament champions
2003	Brian Huddleston	33–20–1	16–10–1	RRAC	2nd
2004	Brian Huddleston	41–15	13–1	RRAC	Regular season champions tournament champions
2005	Brian Huddleston	48–7	14–0	RRAC	Regular season champions tournament champions
2006	Jared Moon	40–16–1	14–1	RRAC	Regular season champions tournament champions
2007	Jared Moon	44–20	12–3	RRAC	Regular season champions NAIA World Series
NCAA Division I
Independent
2008	Jared Moon	23–24	–	Independent	
2009	Jared Moon	11–40	–	Independent	
Great West Conference
2010	Jared Moon	29–31	15–13	Great West	3rd place regular season 2nd in Great West Tournament Pool 1
2011	Jared Moon	22–40	16–12	Great West	3rd place regular season (T); Great West Tournament finalist
2012	Jared Moon	28–33	15–13	Great West	4th place regular season (T); Great West Tournament finalist
2013	Jared Moon	34–20–1	17–10	Great West	2nd place Great West regular season (T); Great West Tournament champion
Southland Conference
2014	Jared Moon	23–38	12–18	Southland	10th of 14 SLC regular season
2015	Jared Moon	28–27	14–13	Southland	7th of 13 SLC regular season SLC Tournament Champion (4-0); Houston Regional (0—2)
2016	Jared Moon	24–29	12–18	Southland	10th of 13 SLC regular season
2017	Jared Moon	29–25	18–12	Southland	4th of 13 SLC regular season (3–2) SLC Tournament
2018	Jared Moon	29–30	18–12	Southland	4th of 13 SLC regular season (3–2) SLC Tournament
2019	Jared Moon	18–35	10–20	Southland	12th of 13 SLC regular season
2020	Jared Moon	6–11	2–1	Southland	Season cancelled due to COVID-19
2021	Jared Moon	14–38	11–27	Southland	13th of 13 SLC regular season
2022	Lance Berkman	18–36	11–13	Southland	6th of 8 SLC regular season (0-2) SLC Tournament
2023	Lance Berkman	11–37	7–16	Southland	9th of 9 SLC regular season
2024	Lance Berkman	18–31	9–15	Southland	9th of 9 SLC regular season
2025	Clay VanderLaan	32–25	17–13	Southland	6th of 11 SLC regular season SLC Tournament Champion (5–0); Austin Regional (0–2)
2026	Clay VanderLaan	24–29	13–17	Southland	9th of 11 SLC regular season (1–2) SLC Tournament

== Postseason ==
=== Conference Tournaments ===
Year	Head coach	Record	%	Notes
Conference Tournament Results
NAIA District 8
1969 (Note: Houston Baptist competed as an NAIA Independent team in 1969.)	Lonnie Richards	1–0	1.000	Champion
Red River Athletics Conference
1999	Brian Huddleston	4–0	1.000	Tournament champion
2000	Brian Huddleston	4–1	.800	Tournament champion
2001	Brian Huddleston	4–0	1.000	Tournament champion
2002	Brian Huddleston	4–0	1.000	Tournament champion
2003	Brian Huddleston	2–2	.500	3rd Round
2004	Brian Huddleston	4–0	1.000	Tournament champion
2005	Brian Huddleston	4–0	1.000	Tournament champion
2006	Jared Moon	4–0	1.000	Tournament champion
2007	Jared Moon	2–1	.667	3rd Round
National Independent Tournament
2009	Jared Moon	1–3	.250	
Great West Conference
2010	Jared Moon	2–1	.667	2nd in Great West Tournament Pool 1
2011	Jared Moon	4–2	.667	Runner-up
2012	Jared Moon	4–2	.667	Runner-up
2013	Jared Moon	4–0	1.000	Tournament champion
Southland Conference
2015	Jared Moon	4–0	1.000	Tournament champion
2017	Jared Moon	3-2	.600	Consolation Rounds
2018	Jared Moon	3-2	.600	Consolation Rounds
2022	Lance Berkman	0-2	.000	First Round
2025	Clay Vanderlaan	5-0	1.000	Tournament champion
2026	Clay Vanderlaan	1-2	.333	Consolation Rounds
Total		64–20	.762	21 Appearances

=== NCAA Division I Tournament results ===
The Huskies have competed in two NCAA Division I baseball tournaments with a record of 0–4.

Year	Round	Opponent	Result/Score
NCAA Division I Tournament Results
2015	First Round; Second Round	Houston; Rice	L 4–6; L 1–3
2025	First Round; Second Round	Texas; Kansas State	L 1–7; L 4–7

=== NAIA World Series results ===
The Huskies participated in the 2007 NAIA World Series with a record of 3–2.

Year	Round	Opponent	Result/Score
NAIA World Series
2007	First Round; Second Round; Third Round; Fourth Round; Fifth Round	Lindenwood (Mo); Cumberland (Tenn); Walsh; Azusa Pacific; Lewis-Clark State	L 4–18; W 5–2; W 10–5; W 5–1; L 7–8

== Major League Baseball ==
Houston Christian has had 8 Major League Baseball draft selections since the draft began in 1965.

Huskies in the Major League Baseball Draft
Year	Player	Round	Team
1971	Ron Mahood	7	Expos
1996	Ryan Thomas	23	Padres
1996	Trevor Enders		Rays
1998	Galen Shea	19	Tigers
2000	Brian Steffek	27	Dodgers
2003	Kyle Smith	18	Reds
2010	Johnathan Moore	45	Rangers
2012	Robbie Buller	35	Diamondbacks
2015	Zach Nehrir	16	Diamondbacks
2017	Addison Russ	19	Phillies
2018	Tyler Depreta-Johnson	35	Rangers
2023	Morris Austin	10	Brewers
2026	Luke Bard	19	Dodgers

== See also ==
- List of NCAA Division I baseball programs
