= Utah Valley Wolverines baseball =

- 2026 Utah Valley Wolverines baseball team
- University: Utah Valley University
- Head coach: Nate Rasmussen (2nd season)
- Conference: Western Athletic Conference; West Division
- Location: Orem, Utah
- Home stadium: UCCU Ballpark (capacity: 5,000)
- Nickname: Wolverines
- Colors: Green and white

NCAA tournament appearances
- 2016, 2025

Conference tournament champions
- Great West: 2010, 2011, 2012; WAC: 2016, 2025

Conference regular season champions
- Great West: 2010, 2011, 2012

The Utah Valley Wolverines baseball team represents Utah Valley University, which is located in Orem, Utah. The Wolverines are an NCAA Division I college baseball program that competes in the Western Athletic Conference. They joined NCAA Division I in 2009. They formerly played in the Great West Conference from 2008 to 2013.

== NCAA Tournament ==
Utah Valley has participated in the NCAA Division I baseball tournament twice. They have a record of 1–4.

Year	Region	Opponent	Result
2016	Baton Rouge Regional	LSU; Southeastern Louisiana	L 1–7; L 2–3
2025	Eugene Regional	Oregon; Arizona; Cal Poly	W 6–5; L 4–14; L 6–7^{11}

== Wolverines in Major League Baseball ==
Three former players have gone on to play in Major League Baseball:

- Kam Mickolio - RHP
- Mitch Jones - OF
- Paxton Schultz - RHP

== Seasons ==
Season	Coach	Overall		Conference		Conference Finish	Postseason
Season	Coach	W	L	W	L	Conference Finish	Postseason
Western Athletic Conference (2014–present)
2014	Eric Madsen	28	30	16	11	4th	WAC Tournament
2015	Eric Madsen	19	35	14	13	5th	WAC Tournament
2016	Eric Madsen	37	23	18	9	3rd	WAC Tournament Champions; NCAA Regional
2017	Eric Madsen	18	36	11	13	6th	WAC Tournament
2018	Eric Madsen	15	37	6	18	8th	—
2019	Eric Madsen	15	41	9	18	7th	WAC Tournament
2020	Eric Madsen	5	12	0	0	Canceled	Canceled
2021	Eric Madsen / David Carter	10	47	8	28	9th	—
2022	Eddie Smith	19	37	10	20	5th (West)	—
2023	Eddie Smith	34	24	16	13	5th	WAC Tournament Runner-up
2024	Eddie Smith	29	29	18	12	3rd	WAC Tournament
2025	Nate Rasmussen	33	29	13	11	4th	WAC Tournament Champions; NCAA Regional
2026	Nate Rasmussen	18	36	12	18	8th	WAC Tournament
Total		275	403	165	199		

== See also ==
- List of NCAA Division I baseball programs
