= Great West Conference =

American college athletic conference

- Formerly: Great West Football Conference
- Association: NCAA
- Founded: 2004
- Folded: 2013
- Commissioner: Ed Grom
- Sports fielded: 15; men's: 5; women's: 9
- Division: Division I
- No. of teams: 5 (final)
- Headquarters: Naperville, Illinois
- Region: Various
- Website: www.greatwestconference.org

Locations

The Great West Conference (GWC) was an NCAA college athletic conference in the continental United States. Originally a football-only league, it became an all-sports entity during the 2008–09 season. The GWC stopped sponsoring football following the 2011 season. The conference became defunct when four of the remaining five full member schools became members of other conferences on July 1, 2013.

== History ==
Cal Poly, North Dakota State, Northern Colorado, South Dakota State, Southern Utah, and UC Davis inaugurated the Great West Football Conference during the 2004 season. Cal Poly and UC Davis had previously been members of the American West Conference, a similar low-level conference that existed in the 1990s. St. Mary's (CA) was originally slated to join as well, but then dropped the sport six months before the league started play. In 2005, Cal Poly became the first GWFC team ever selected to participate in the NCAA Division I-AA (now FCS) playoffs.

Northern Colorado departed the Great West for the Big Sky Conference in every sport as of the 2006 football season and 2006–07 academic year. On March 7, 2007, North Dakota State and South Dakota State announced that they would leave the GWFC after the 2007 football season, and join the Gateway Football Conference as of 2008. By the time the two schools actually made the switch, the Gateway had renamed itself the Missouri Valley Football Conference. The duo also placed their other sports, which were then independent, in the Summit League as of the 2008–09 academic year.

On August 2, 2007, North Dakota and South Dakota announced that they would join the Great West Football Conference as of the 2008 season. This agreement allowed the total number of GWFC programs to remain consistent at five, while also retaining the same geographic footprint.

On July 10, 2008, it was made official through a series of press conferences that the Great West would soon transition from a football-only league into an all-sports conference. The charter members included North Dakota, South Dakota, New Jersey Institute of Technology (NJIT), Houston Baptist, Texas-Pan American, and Utah Valley. On October 22, 2008, Chicago State announced plans to join the newly rechristened GWC as well. Seattle was initially considering membership, but in mid-2011 accepted an invitation to instead join the WAC as of the 2012–13 academic year.

The expanded version of the Great West officially began playing a limited number of sports in the fall of 2008. Despite not sponsoring conference schedules in team sports (except football), the league began awarding "Player of the Week" honors to student-athletes in every sport during the 2008–09 season. The Great West featured championships in men's and women's cross country, men's and women's indoor track and field, men's and women's outdoor track and field, men's and women's golf, and women's tennis during the 2008–09 academic year. In 2009–10, regular season schedules and championship tournaments were implemented in women's volleyball, women's soccer, men's and women's basketball, baseball, and softball.

Due to its newness, the league did not have an automatic bid to the NCAA Tournament, but the Great West Conference men's basketball tournament champion received an automatic bid to the CollegeInsider.com Postseason Tournament (CIT), while the women's basketball tournament winners went to the Women's Basketball Invitational (WBI).

In April 2010, South Dakota publicized intentions to join the Summit League for all sports but football, effective as of the 2011–12 academic year. Seven months later, in November 2010, the school would announce a commitment to the MVFC for football as of the 2012 season. In September 2010, Cal Poly and UC Davis announced that they would join the Big Sky Conference for football by 2012. Then, in November 2010, Southern Utah and North Dakota announced that they would join the Big Sky for all sports by 2012. South Dakota was considering the Big Sky as well, thus canceling the Summit League commitment, before the MVFC offered football-only membership.

With these moves, all football programs would soon leave the Great West, and the league stopped sponsoring the sport following the 2011 season. South Dakota stepped down to football-only status during the 2011–12 academic year, allowing the league to retain five teams in its final season on the gridiron. Overall the conference lost two full members—South Dakota and North Dakota—and six affiliates by the fall of 2012. The affiliate teams were Cal Poly, UC Davis, and Southern Utah in football; Nebraska-Omaha in softball; as well as multi-sport partners Cal State Bakersfield and Seattle.

In November 2011, Houston Baptist reached an agreement to join the Southland Conference as of the 2013–14 academic year. The school also unveiled plans to begin sponsoring football. In September 2012, Utah Valley announced plans to join the Western Athletic Conference for the 2013–14 season. At the beginning of December 2012, Texas–Pan American announced they had received an invitation to join the WAC for 2013–14 school year. On December 5, 2012, Chicago State announced that it would also join the WAC in 2013–14, and two weeks later, Texas–Pan American accepted their invitation. These departures led to the end of the Great West. NJIT, which became an independent after the demise of the Great West, joined the Atlantic Sun Conference on June 11, 2015.

== Member schools ==
=== Former full members ===
Institution	Location	Nickname	Founded	Affiliation	Enrollment	Joined	Left	Subsequent conference(s)	Current conference
Chicago State University	Chicago, Illinois	Cougars	1867	Public	7,131	2008	2013	Western (WAC) (2013–22); D-I Independent (2022–24)	Northeast (2024–present)
Houston Baptist University (Note: Currently known as Houston Christian University since 2022.)	Houston, Texas	Huskies	1960	Baptist (BGCT)	2,567	2008	2013	Southland (2013–present)	
New Jersey Institute of Technology	Newark, New Jersey	Highlanders	1881	Public	9,944	2008	2013	D-I Independent (2013–15); Atlantic Sun (ASUN) (2015–20)	America East (2020–present)
University of North Dakota	Grand Forks, North Dakota	Fighting Sioux (Note: North Dakota is now competing as the Fighting Hawks since the 2015–16 school year.)	1883	Public	15,250	2008	2012	Big Sky (2012–18)	Summit (Note: North Dakota joined the Missouri Valley Football Conference (MVFC) for football in the 2020 fall season.) (2018–present)
University of South Dakota	Vermillion, South Dakota	Coyotes	1862	Public	10,284	2008	2011	Summit (Note: South Dakota remained in the Great West for football in the 2011 fall season, before joining the Missouri Valley Football Conference (MVFC) for football in the 2012 fall season.) (2011–present)	
University of Texas–Pan American (Note: Texas–Pan American (UTPA) merged with the University of Texas at Brownsville (UTB) in 2015, becoming the University of Texas Rio Grande Valley (UTRGV) Vaqueros)	Edinburg, Texas	Broncs	1927	Public	19,302	2008	2013	Western (WAC) (2013–24)	Southland (2024–present)
Utah Valley University	Orem, Utah	Wolverines	1941	Public	31,556	2008	2013	Western (WAC) (2013–2026)	Big West (2026-future)

=== Former affiliate members ===
Institution	Location	Nickname	Founded	Affiliation	Enrollment	Joined	Left	Current primary conference	Great West sport
University of Northern Colorado	Greeley, Colorado	Bears	1889	Public	12,497	2004–05	2005–06	Big Sky	football
North Dakota State University	Fargo, North Dakota	Bison	1890	Public	14,443	2004–05	2007–08	Summit (Note: North Dakota State joined the Missouri Valley Football Conference (MVFC) for football in the 2008 fall season.)	football
South Dakota State University	Brookings, South Dakota	Jackrabbits	1881	Public	12,725	2004–05	2007–08	Summit (Note: South Dakota State joined the Missouri Valley Football Conference (MVFC) for football in the 2008 fall season.)	football
Southern Utah University	Cedar City, Utah	Thunderbirds	1897	Public	8,297	2004–05	2011–12	Western (WAC)	football
California Polytechnic State University (Cal Poly)	San Luis Obispo, California	Mustangs	1901	Public	18,679	2004–05	2011–12	Big West (Note: Cal Poly joined the Big Sky Conference for football in the 2012 fall season.)	football
University of California, Davis (UC Davis)	Davis, California	Aggies	1905	Public	31,862	2004–05	2011–12	Big West (Note: UC Davis joined the Big Sky Conference for football in the 2012 fall season.)	football
Seattle University	Seattle, Washington	Redhawks	1891	Catholic (Jesuit)	7,755	2010–11	2011–12	Western (WAC)	track & field (Note: Seattle joined the Great West for men's & women's indoor track & field and men's & women's outdoor track & field.)
University of Nebraska Omaha	Omaha, Nebraska	Mavericks	1908	Public	14,903	2011–12	2011–12	Summit	softball
California State University, Bakersfield	Bakersfield, California	Roadrunners	1965	Public	8,111	2011–12	2011–12	Western (WAC)	women's tennis
Delaware State University	Dover, Delaware	Hornets	1891	Public	4,425	2009	2013	Mid-Eastern (MEAC)	women's soccer
Howard University	Washington, D.C.	Bison	1867	Nonsectarian	10,000	2009–10	2012–13	Mid-Eastern (MEAC)	women's soccer
New York Institute of Technology (NYIT)	Old Westbury, New York	Bears	1955	Nonsectarian	14,000	2009–10	2012–13	N/A (Note: New York Tech (NYIT) suspended its athletics program after the 2018–19 school year.)	baseball
South Carolina State University	Orangeburg, South Carolina	Bulldogs	1896	Public	4,500	2009–10	2012–13	Mid-Eastern (MEAC)	women's soccer

=== Membership timeline ===
Football-only members Full members (including football) Full members (non-football) Associate members, other sports

== Football champions ==
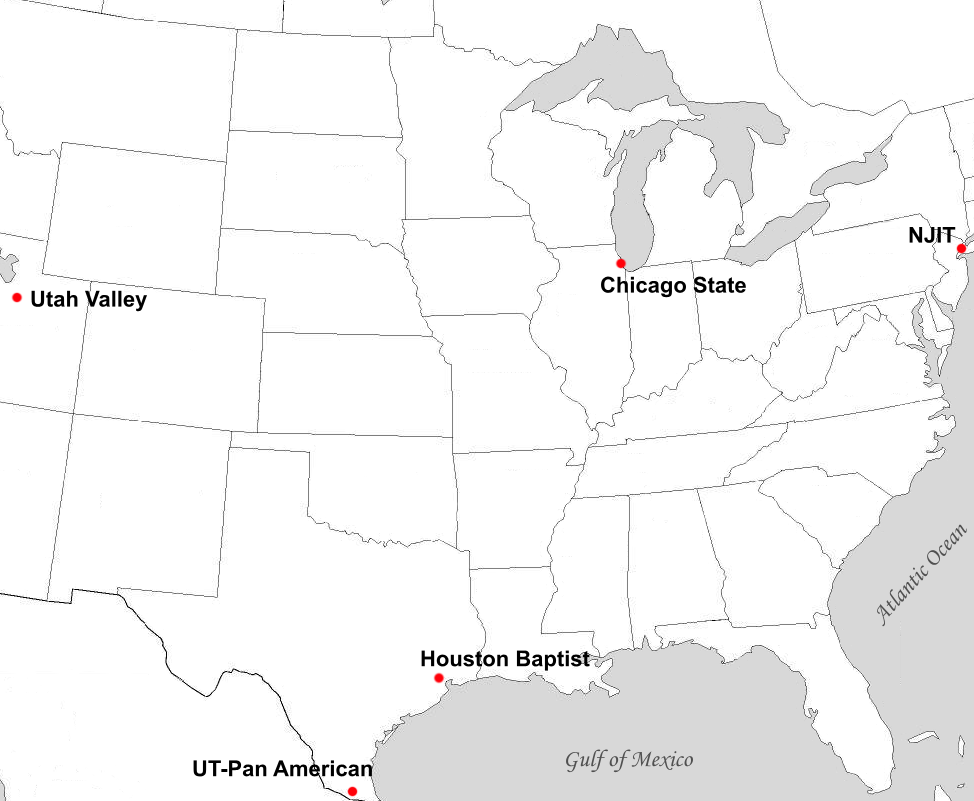
Locations of final Great West Conference full member institutions.

Season	Champions	Record
2004	Cal Poly	4–1
2005	Cal Poly and UC Davis	4–1
2006	North Dakota State	4–0
2007	South Dakota State	4–0
2008	Cal Poly	3–0
2009	UC Davis	3–1
2010	Southern Utah	4–0
2011	North Dakota and Cal Poly	3–1

== Basketball champions ==
In 2010, the Great West Conference sponsored men's and women's basketball championship tournaments for the first time. Both events were held in Orem, Utah, at the UCCU Center, home of Utah Valley University. The top-seeded men from the South Dakota reaffirmed their regular season success with a 91–86 title game victory over runner-up Houston Baptist. On the women's side, Utah Valley took advantage of the crowd's support, as the number six seeds upset their way to the crown by wrapping up the stunning run with a 70–62 triumph over regular season winners North Dakota.

The Great West tournaments returned to the UCCU Center for an encore in 2011, and third-seeded North Dakota claimed the men's championship after a 77–76 double overtime thriller against South Dakota, which was seeded fourth. Regular season winners Chicago State remained true to form in the women's bracket, outlasting third seeds North Dakota by a score of 74–66.

In 2012, the Great West tournaments shifted to the Emil and Patricia Jones Convocation Center at Chicago State University. North Dakota became the league's first back-to-back champs, as the second seeds enjoyed a 75–60 victory over fourth-seeded NJIT in the men's final. The weekend would end with a clean sweep for North Dakota, as the program's top-seeded women knocked off regular season runners-up Utah Valley 69–56 to claim their maiden league title.

The Great West Conference never had an automatic bid to the NCAA Men or Women's College Tournament, but the men's champions did receive automatic selection to the CollegeInsider.com Postseason Tournament, while their female counterparts headed to the Women's Basketball Invitational.

Season	Men's Regular Season Winners	Men's Tournament Champions	Season	Women's Regular Season Winners	Women's Tournament Champions
2009–10	South Dakota	South Dakota	2009–10	North Dakota	Utah Valley
2010–11	Utah Valley	North Dakota	2010–11	Chicago State	Chicago State
2011–12	Utah Valley	North Dakota	2011–12	North Dakota	North Dakota
2012–13	NJIT	Chicago State	2012–13	Utah Valley	NJIT

=== See also ===
- Great West Conference men's basketball tournament
- Great West Conference women's basketball tournament

== Baseball champions ==
The Great West Conference sponsored its inaugural baseball championship tournament in 2010, and held the event in different cities during each of its four years of existence. The league also experimented with formats, using pool play in 2010 but a traditional double elimination bracket from 2011 to 2013. Utah Valley claimed the first three regular season and tournament championships, while Northern Colorado and Houston Baptist won the final regular season and tournament championships, respectively. As in other sports, the Great West did not have an automatic bid to the NCAA Division I Baseball Championship and no teams within the league earned an at-large invitation.

Season	Regular season winners	Tournament Champions
2010	Utah Valley	Utah Valley
2011	Utah Valley	Utah Valley
2012	Utah Valley	Utah Valley
2013	Northern Colorado	Houston Baptist

=== See also ===
- Great West Conference baseball tournament

== Other champions ==
In addition to formerly sponsoring football; while continuing to sponsor men's basketball, women's basketball, and baseball; the Great West Conference sponsored many other sports. The GWC held its own men's golf championship in 2009, but the league's members decided to compete under the banner of the older and larger America Sky Men's Golf Conference starting in 2010, even though the option existed to hold a smaller Great West tournament and then participate in the America Sky event as well. Making men's tennis a league sport was also under discussion, but it never happened because only three schools—Chicago State, NJIT, and Texas Pan-American—had teams as of the 2012 season. The America Sky continued in operation during the 2014 season. That conference was absorbed by the Big Sky Conference in July 2014 once the latter added Idaho as its sixth golf-sponsoring school; the two remaining non-Big Sky members of the America Sky then became Big Sky golf affiliates.

Season	Women's Volleyball Tournament Champions	Season	Women's Soccer Tournament Champions	Season	Softball Tournament Champions	Season	Women's Tennis Tournament Champions
2009	North Dakota	2009	Utah Valley	2010	North Dakota	2010	Texas-Pan American
2010	North Dakota	2010	Houston Baptist	2011	Houston Baptist	2011	NJIT
2011	North Dakota	2011	Utah Valley	2012	Utah Valley	2012	NJIT
Season	Men's Cross Country Champions	Season	Men's Indoor Track & Field Champions	Season	Men's Outdoor Track & Field Champions	Season	Men's Golf Champions
2008	Texas Pan-American	2008–09	South Dakota	2009	Utah Valley	2009	Houston Baptist
2009	Utah Valley	2009–10	South Dakota	2010	Utah Valley	2010	ASMGC: Texas-Pan American
2010	Utah Valley	2010–11	South Dakota	2011	Utah Valley	2011	ASMGC: Weber State
2011	Utah Valley	2011–12	Utah Valley	2012	Utah Valley	2012	ASMGC: Sacramento State
Season	Women's Cross Country Champions	Season	Women's Indoor Track & Field Champions	Season	Women's Outdoor Track & Field Champions	Season	Women's Golf Champions
2008	Utah Valley	2008–09	South Dakota	2009	Utah Valley	2009	Texas-Pan American
2009	Utah Valley	2009–10	South Dakota	2010	Utah Valley	2010	Houston Baptist
2010	Utah Valley	2010–11	South Dakota	2011	Utah Valley	2011	Houston Baptist
2011	Utah Valley	2011–12	Utah Valley	2012	Utah Valley	2012	Houston Baptist

== Facilities ==
Each full member of the Great West Conference has an on-campus basketball arena. Seating capacities range between 1,500 and 8,500. The full members are joined by three affiliates in baseball, forming an eight-team league. In women's soccer, the presence of three affiliates helped create a six-team league.

Softball previously had four members, with Nebraska-Omaha replacing South Dakota for the 2012 season, but North Dakota and Nebraska-Omaha departed at the conclusion of that campaign. This leaves just Houston Baptist and Utah Valley, with no future alignment announced as of August 2012.

School	Basketball arena	Capacity	Baseball stadium	Capacity	Softball stadium	Capacity	Soccer complex	Capacity
NJIT	Fleisher Center	1,500	B&E Riverfront Stadium	6,200	Non-softball school		Lubetkin Field	1,000+
NYIT	Baseball-only member		President's Field	1,000	Baseball-only member			
Delaware State	Soccer-only member						Alumni Stadium	7,193
Howard	Soccer-only member						William H. Greene Stadium	10,000
South Carolina State	Soccer-only member						Oliver C. Dawson Stadium	22,000
