= 2009 Cal Poly Mustangs football team =

American college football season

2009 Cal Poly Mustangs football
- Conference: Great West Conference
- Record: 4–7 (1–3 GWC)
- Head coach: Tim Walsh (1st season)
- Co-offensive coordinators: Brian Cook (1st season); Saga Tuitele (1st season)
- Offensive scheme: Triple option
- Defensive coordinator: Greg Lupfer (1st season)
- Base defense: 3–4
- Home stadium: Alex G. Spanos Stadium

2009 Great West Conference football standings
	Conf.			Overall
Team	W		L	W		L
UC Davis $	3	–	1	6	–	5
North Dakota	2	–	2	6	–	5
South Dakota	2	–	2	5	–	5
Southern Utah	2	–	2	5	–	6
Cal Poly	1	–	3	4	–	7
$ – Conference champion

The 2009 Cal Poly Mustangs football team represented California Polytechnic State University, San Luis Obispo as member of the Great West Conference (GWC) during the 2009 NCAA Division I FCS football season. Led by first-year head coach Tim Walsh, Cal Poly compiled an overall record of 4–7 with a mark of 1–3 in conference play, placing last out of five teams in the GWC. The Mustangs played home games at Alex G. Spanos Stadium in San Luis Obispo, California.

== Schedule ==
Date	Opponent	Rank	Site	Result	Attendance	Source
September 12	Sacramento State*	No. 12	Mustang Stadium; San Luis Obispo, CA	W 38–19	10,381	
September 19	at Ohio*	No. 12	Peden Stadium; Athens, OH	L 10–28	16,018	
September 26	at San Jose State*	No. 16	Spartan Stadium; San Jose, CA	L 9–19	13,510	
October 3	No. 16 South Dakota State*	No. 19	Mustang Stadium; San Luis Obispo, CA	W 21–14	10,331	
October 10	at No. 4 Montana*	No. 15	Washington–Grizzly Stadium; Missoula, MT	L 23–35	25,694	
October 17	Southern Utah	No. 19	Mustang Stadium; San Luis Obispo, CA	W 24–23		
October 24	Dixie State*	No. 20	Mustang Stadium; San Luis Obispo, CA	W 44–14		
October 31	at North Dakota	No. 18	Alerus Center; Grand Forks, ND	L 17–31	6,711	
November 7	at UC Davis		Aggie Stadium; Davis, CA (rivalry)	L 10–23	10,849	
November 14	South Dakota		Mustang Stadium; San Luis Obispo, CA	L 48–50		
November 21	at No. 19 Weber State*		Wildcat Stadium; Ogden, UT	L 14–47	5,382	
*Non-conference game; Rankings from The Sports Network Poll released prior to the game
