= 2009 UC Davis Aggies football team =

American college football season

2009 UC Davis Aggies football

GWC champion
- Conference: Great West Conference
- Record: 6–5 (3–1 GWC)
- Head coach: Bob Biggs (17th season)
- Offensive coordinator: Mike Moroski (17th season)
- Defensive coordinator: Mark Johnson (1st season)
- Home stadium: Aggie Stadium

2009 Great West Conference football standings
	Conf.			Overall
Team	W		L	W		L
UC Davis $	3	–	1	6	–	5
North Dakota	2	–	2	6	–	5
South Dakota	2	–	2	5	–	5
Southern Utah	2	–	2	5	–	6
Cal Poly	1	–	3	4	–	7
$ – Conference champion

The 2009 UC Davis football team represented the University of California, Davis as a member of the Great West Conference (GWC) during the 2009 NCAA Division I FCS football season. Led by 17th-year head coach Bob Biggs, UC Davis compiled an overall record of 6–5 with a mark of 3–1 in conference play, winning the GWC title. The team was outscored by its opponents 300 to 272 for the season. The Aggies played home games at Aggie Stadium in Davis, California.

== Schedule ==
Date	Time	Opponent	Site	Result	Attendance	Source
September 5	7:00 p.m.	at Fresno State*	Bulldog Stadium; Fresno, CA	L 0–51	37,267	
September 12	7:00 p.m.	No. 5 Montana*	Aggie Stadium; Davis, CA	L 10–17	9,087	
September 26	6:00 p.m.	Western Oregon*	Aggie Stadium; Davis, CA	W 29–13	10,078	
October 3	5:00 p.m.	at No. 5 (FBS) Boise State*	Bronco Stadium; Boise, ID	L 16–34	32,497	
October 10	12:00 p.m.	at South Dakota	DakotaDome; Vermillion, SD	W 24–23	9,884	
October 17	6:00 p.m.	Winston-Salem State*^{†}	Aggie Stadium; Davis, CA	W 45–14	10,289	
October 24	1:05 p.m.	at Portland State*	PGE Park; Portland, OR	W 34–31	5,180	
October 31	12:00 p.m.	at Southern Utah	Eccles Coliseum; Cedar City, UT	L 35–56	3,035	
November 7	1:00 p.m.	Cal Poly	Aggie Stadium; Davis, CA (Battle for the Golden Horseshoe)	W 23–10	10,849	
November 14	1:00 p.m.	North Dakota	Aggie Stadium; Davis, CA	W 28–20	9,239	
November 21	2:05 p.m.	at Sacramento State*	Hornet Stadium; Sacramento, CA (Causeway Classic)	L 28–31	17,127	
*Non-conference game; ^{†}Homecoming; Rankings from The Sports Network Poll released prior to the game; All times are in Pacific time
