= 2009 North Dakota Fighting Sioux football team =

American college football season

2009 North Dakota Fighting Sioux football
- Conference: Great West Conference
- Record: 6–5 (2–2 GWC)
- Head coach: Chris Mussman (2nd season)
- Offensive coordinator: Greg Breitbach (2nd season)
- Co-defensive coordinators: John Kelling (4th season); Mike Mannausau (4th season)
- Home stadium: Alerus Center

2009 Great West Conference football standings
	Conf.			Overall
Team	W		L	W		L
UC Davis $	3	–	1	6	–	5
North Dakota	2	–	2	6	–	5
South Dakota	2	–	2	5	–	5
Southern Utah	2	–	2	5	–	6
Cal Poly	1	–	3	4	–	7
$ – Conference champion

The 2009 North Dakota Fighting Sioux football team represented the University of North Dakota as a member of the Great West Conference (GWC) during the 2009 NCAA Division I FCS football season. Led by second-year head coach Chris Mussman, the Fighting Sioux compiled an overall record of 6–5 with a mark of 2–2 in conference play, placing in a three-way tie for second in the GWC. The team played home games at the Alerus Center in Grand Forks, North Dakota.

== Schedule ==
Date	Time	Opponent	Site	Result	Attendance
September 5	6:00 pm	at Texas Tech*	Jones AT&T Stadium; Lubbock, TX	L 13–38	47,824
September 19	6:00 pm	at Northwestern State*	Harry Turpin Stadium; Natchitoches, LA	W 27–20	10,258
September 26	6:00 pm	at Stephen F. Austin*	Homer Bryce Stadium; Nacogdoches, TX	L 31–65	10,152
October 3	4:00 pm	South Dakota^{†}	Alerus Center; Grand Forks, ND (Sitting Bull Trophy)	W 27–12	12,431
October 10	1:00 pm	Stony Brook*	Alerus Center; Grand Forks, ND	W 31–24	8,494
October 17	1:00 pm	Sioux Falls*	Alerus Center; Grand Forks, ND	L 13–28	7,807
October 24	3:00 pm	at Southern Utah	Eccles Coliseum; Cedar City, UT	L 10–35	4,238
October 31	4:00 pm	No. 18 Cal Poly	Alerus Center; Grand Forks, ND	W 31–17	6,711
November 7	4:00 pm	Southern Oregon*	Alerus Center; Grand Forks, ND	W 30–24	7,253
November 14	3:00 pm	at UC Davis	Aggie Stadium; Davis, CA	L 20–28	9,239
November 28	1:00 pm	at Central Arkansas*	Estes Stadium; Conway, AR	W 17–16	4,239
*Non-conference game; ^{†}Homecoming; Rankings from The Sports Network Poll released prior to the game; All times are in Central time
