= 2009 Boise State Broncos football team =

American college football season

2009 Boise State Broncos football

WAC champion Fiesta Bowl champion

Fiesta Bowl, W 17–10 vs. TCU
- Conference: Western Athletic Conference

Ranking
- Coaches: No. 4
- AP: No. 4
- Record: 14–0 (8–0 WAC)
- Head coach: Chris Petersen (4th season)
- Offensive coordinator: Bryan Harsin (4th season)
- Offensive scheme: Multiple
- Defensive coordinator: Justin Wilcox (4th season)
- Base defense: 4–3
- Home stadium: Bronco Stadium

2009 Western Athletic Conference football standings
	Conf.			Overall
Team	W		L	W		L
No. 4 Boise State $%	8	–	0	14	–	0
Nevada	7	–	1	8	–	5
Fresno State	6	–	2	8	–	5
Idaho	4	–	4	8	–	5
Hawaii	3	–	5	6	–	7
Louisiana Tech	3	–	5	4	–	8
Utah State	3	–	5	4	–	8
New Mexico State	1	–	7	3	–	10
San Jose State	1	–	7	2	–	10
% – BCS at-large representative; $ – Conference champion; Rankings from AP Poll

The 2009 Boise State Broncos football team represented Boise State University in the 2009 NCAA Division I FBS football season. The Broncos played their home games at Bronco Stadium, most famous for its blue artificial turf surface, often referred to as the "smurf-turf". They completed the regular season undefeated (13–0), their second consecutive unbeaten regular season and fourth in the last six years (2004, 2006, 2008, 2009), and won the WAC title for the seventh time in the last eight years. The Broncos capped their season with a showdown against fellow unbeaten TCU in the 2010 Fiesta Bowl, which marked the Broncos' return to the site of the game that put the program on the national sports map, the 2007 Fiesta Bowl. With their 17–10 win, the Broncos avenged a loss to the Horned Frogs in the previous season's Poinsettia Bowl, and became only the second team in Division I FBS history to finish a season 14–0, after Ohio State in 2002 (Alabama became the third team to go 14–0 just three days after the Fiesta Bowl). The Broncos finished ranked #4 in the Associated Press and USA Today coaches poll for their highest ranking in school history to finish a season.

Head Coach Chris Petersen was named the Paul "Bear" Bryant National Coach of the Year, an award he also won following the 2006 season. Petersen is the first two-time winner of the award since it was renamed in 1986.

== Pre-season ==
The Broncos entered the 2009 season as one of the youngest college teams in the nation, with only five seniors on their roster, easily the fewest in FBS. No other team had fewer than nine.

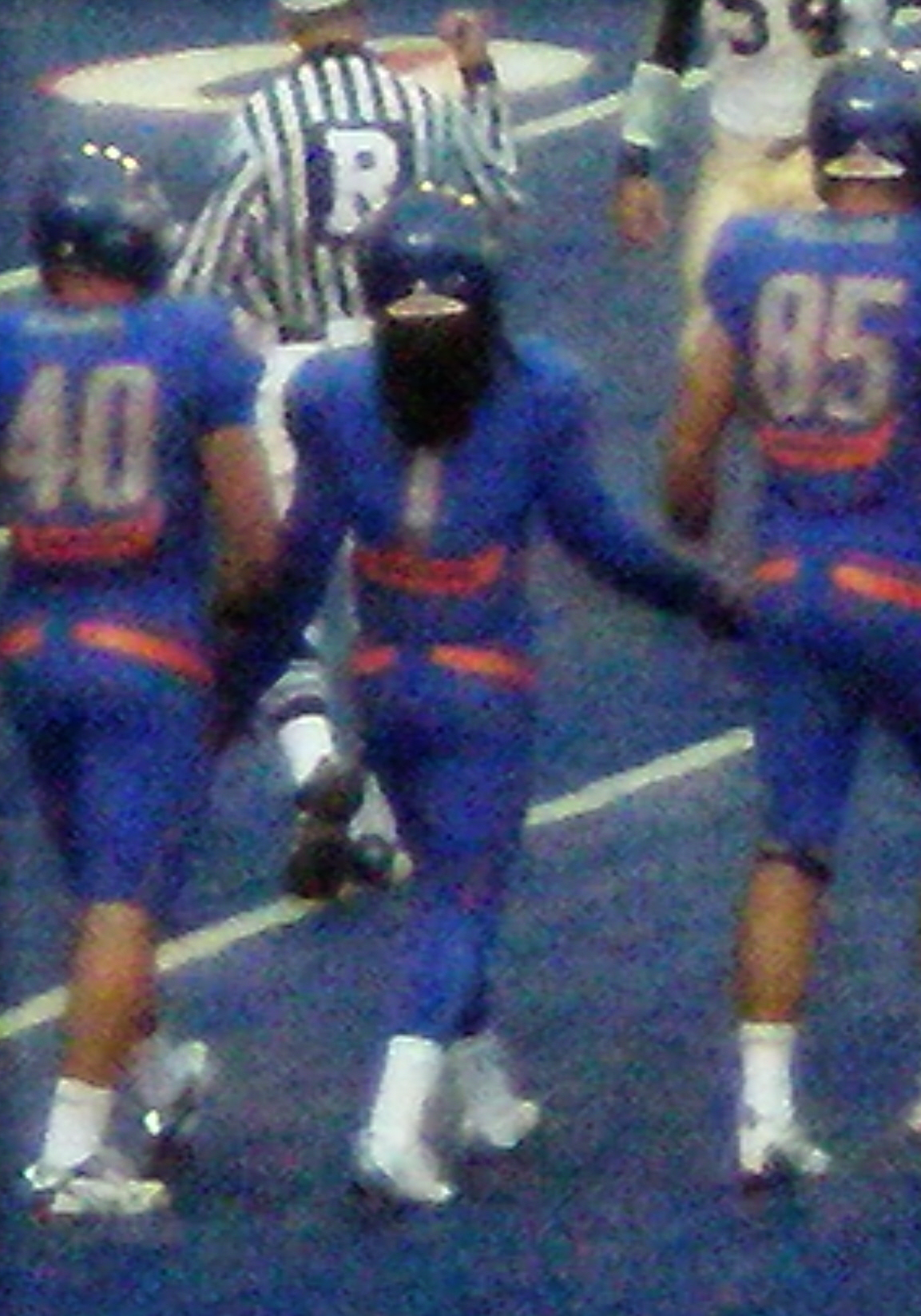
Kyle Wilson

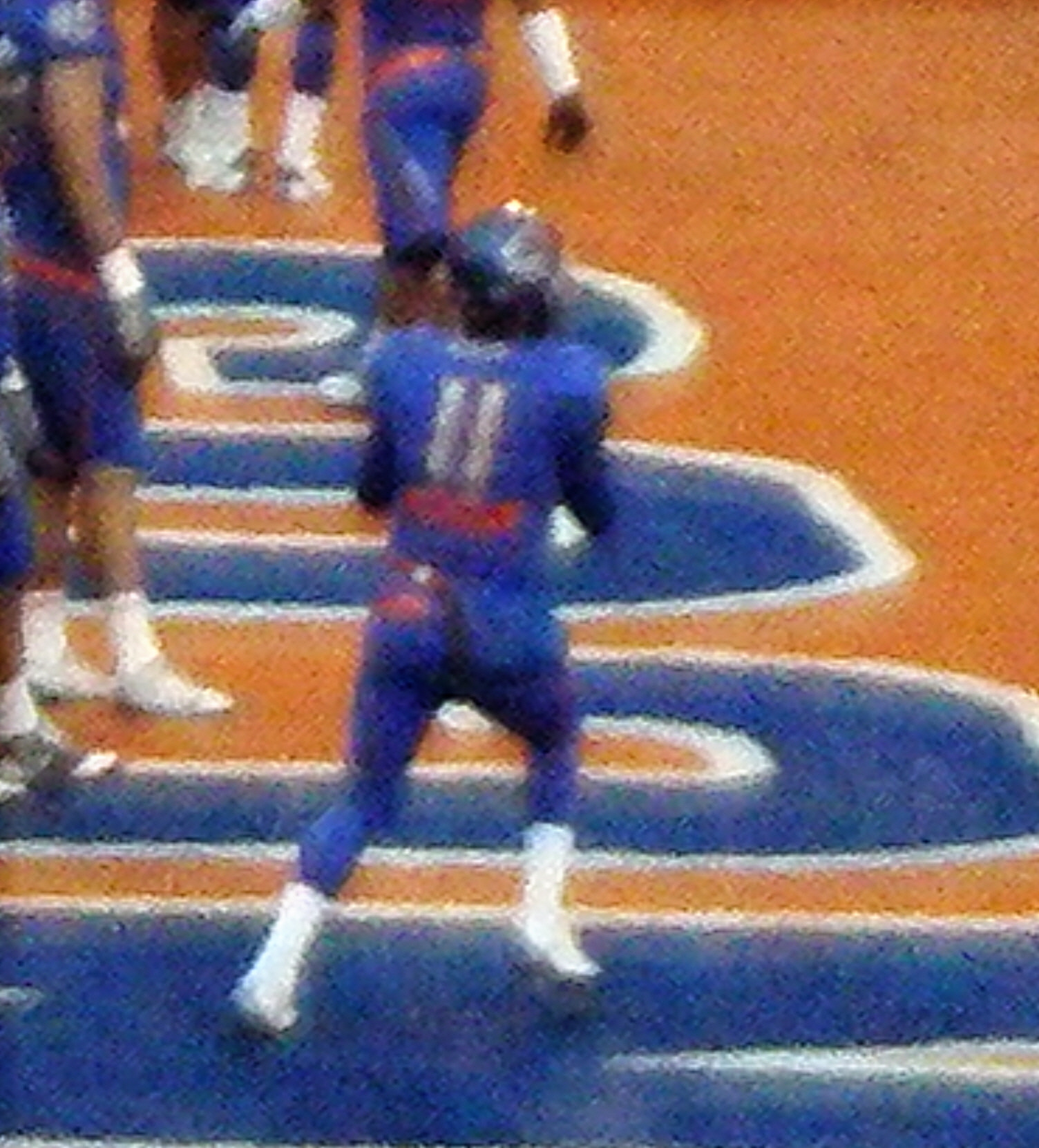
Kellen Moore

Two Broncos were listed on scout.com's list of the 100 best returning players in the nation. Senior defensive back Kyle Wilson at #54 (#5 best DB) and sophomore quarterback Kellen Moore at #37 (#11 best QB).

=== All-American lists ===
Kyle Wilson (Sr.-DB)- Playboy, nationalchamps.net 2nd team, CBSSports.com. 2nd team

=== Award Watch lists ===
Rimington- Thomas Byrd (So-C)

Lombardi- Ryan Winterswyk (Jr-DL)

O'Brien- Kellen Moore (So-QB)

Walter Camp- Kellen Moore (So-QB)

Thorpe- Kyle Wilson (Sr-DB)

Groza- Kyle Brotzman (Jr-K)

Bednarik- Kyle Wilson (Sr-DB)

Maxwell- Kellen Moore (So-QB)

Manning- Kellen Moore (So-QB)

Nagurski- Kyle Wilson (Sr-DB)

=== Pre-season Top 25 polls ===
On August 6 Boise State received 542 points to rank 16th in the USA Today preseason poll, two spots behind their season opening opponent, Oregon. The Broncos were the highest rated non BCS conference school.

On August 22 Boise State received 659 points to rank 14th in the Associated Press preseason poll, two spots ahead of Oregon. Just as they were in the USA Today poll, the Broncos were the highest rated non BCS conference school. The 14th ranking was the highest preseason ranking in school history.

=== WAC Media Day ===
On July 29, Boise State was picked to win the WAC and received 8 first place votes in the WAC coaches poll to 1 first place vote for Nevada, but no coach can vote his own team in first place, thus Boise State received all 8 possible first place votes.

- Boise State (8) 64
- Nevada (1) 55
- Fresno State 45
- Louisiana Tech 45
- Hawaii 36
- San Jose State 34
- Utah State 21
- New Mexico State 13
- Idaho 11

The media also voted Boise State to win the conference with the Broncos receiving 55 first place votes to only 3 for Nevada.

1. Boise State (55) 519
2. Nevada (3) 444
3. Fresno State 365
4. Louisiana Tech 360
5. Hawaii 275
6. San Jose State 263
7. Utah State 170
8. Idaho 110
9. New Mexico State 104

And Kyle Wilson was named the preseason Defensive Player of the Year.

=== South endzone bleacher expansion ===
For the second consecutive year Bronco Stadium received an expansion, this time in the south endzone temporary bleachers. Following the multimillion-dollar sky box expansion which opened in 2008, the sub-million dollar bleacher expansion extends the number of rows in the south endzone and adds an additional 1,600 seats to the stadium capacity, which is now 33,500.

== Schedule ==
Date	Time	Opponent	Rank	Site	TV	Result	Attendance
September 3	8:15 pm	No. 16 Oregon*	No. 14	Bronco Stadium; Boise, ID	ESPN	W 19–8	34,127
September 12	6:00 pm	Miami (OH)*	No. 12	Bronco Stadium; Boise, ID	KTVB	W 48–0	32,228
September 18	7:00 pm	at Fresno State	No. 10	Bulldog Stadium; Fresno, CA (Battle for the Milk Can)	ESPN	W 51–34	35,637
September 26	5:00 pm	at Bowling Green*	No. 8	Doyt Perry Stadium; Bowling Green, OH	KTVB	W 49–14	22,396
October 3	6:00 pm	UC Davis*^{†}	No. 5	Bronco Stadium; Boise, ID	KTVB	W 34–16	32,497
October 14	6:00 pm	at Tulsa*	No. 5	Chapman Stadium; Tulsa, OK	ESPN	W 28–21	30,000
October 24	9:00 pm	at Hawaii	No. 6	Aloha Stadium; Honolulu, HI	KTVB	W 54–9	37,928
October 31	1:00 pm	San Jose State	No. 6	Bronco Stadium; Boise, ID	KTVB	W 45–7	31,684
November 6	6:00 pm	at Louisiana Tech	No. 5	Joe Aillet Stadium; Ruston, LA	ESPN2	W 45–35	23,240
November 14	1:30 pm	Idaho	No. 6	Bronco Stadium; Boise, ID (Battle for the Governor's Trophy)	ESPNU	W 63–25	33,986
November 20	7:30 pm	at Utah State	No. 6	Romney Stadium; Logan, UT	ESPN2	W 52–21	18,777
November 27	8:00 pm	Nevada	No. 6	Bronco Stadium; Boise, ID (rivalry)	ESPN2	W 44–33	32,642
December 5	1:00 pm	New Mexico State	No. 6	Bronco Stadium; Boise, ID	KTVB	W 42–7	32,308
January 4	6:00 pm	vs. No. 3 TCU*	No. 6	University of Phoenix Stadium; Glendale, AZ (Fiesta Bowl)	FOX	W 17–10	73,227
*Non-conference game; ^{†}Homecoming; Rankings from AP Poll released prior to the game; All times are in Mountain time

== Game results ==
Rankings reflect the Coaches poll until the week of the Hawaii game, after which the BCS poll was used, and are from the respective poll released prior to game time.

=== Oregon ===
	1	2	3	4	Total
#14 Ducks	0	0	8	0	8
# 16 Broncos	0	13	6	0	19

2nd meeting. 1–0 all time. Last meeting in 2008, a 37–32 Broncos win in Eugene.

On August 31, this game was named the Allstate Sugar Bowl Manning Award Matchup of the Week for the matchup of Boise State QB Kellen Moore vs Oregon QB Jeremiah Masoli.

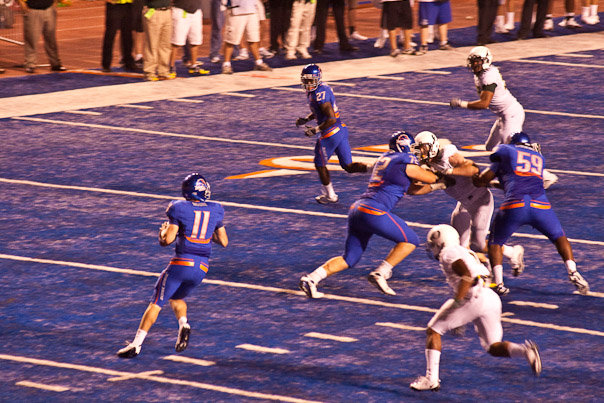
Boise State on offense during the first quarter.

The Broncos won their 50th straight regular season home game, and the first ever at home against a top 25 team, with a 19–8 win over the Oregon Ducks, the second straight year the Broncos have beaten the highly ranked Pac-10 team. The Bronco defense completely shut down the fast-paced spread option offense of Oregon holding them to six first half three and outs, forced a safety in the second quarter, did not allow a first down until 7:07 left in the third quarter and only allowed six overall, and only allowed 31 rushing yards. The Bronco offense scored on a 10-yard TD pass from Kellen Moore to Austin Pettis in the second quarter (Michael Choate 2pt conv.), a D.J. Harper 1 yard TD run in the third (conv. failed), and a 45-yard Kyle Brotzman field goal, but missed several other opportunities to score with two missed field goals, another failed on a bad snap, and three straight fumbles in the second half. The Broncos set a school record with 59 rushing attempts. Kellen Moore finished 19/29 for 197 and 1 TD. Austin Pettis had 6 catches for 68 yards and the TD. The Broncos out gained the Ducks 351 to 152. The 34,127 in attendance set a new Bronco Stadium record. The Broncos moved up 2 spots in the AP poll to #12 and 5 spots in the Coaches poll to #11.

Passing Leaders	Rushing Leaders	Receiving Leaders	Defensive Leaders
Kellen Moore: 19/29, 197 YDS, 1 TD	D.J. Harper: 19 CAR, 88 YDS, 1 TD	Austin Pettis: 6 REC, 68 YDS, 1 TD	Billy Winn: Safety, 4 TOT TKL
	Jeremy Avery: 27 CAR, 74 YDS	Titus Young: 5 REC, 46 YDS	Aaron Tevis: INT, 2 TOT TKL

2nd Quarter

- 07:05 BSU–Austin Pettis 10 Yd Pass From Kellen Moore (Michael Choate Run For Two–Point Conversion) 0–8
- 03:54 BSU–LeGarrette Blount Tackled By Billy Winn In End Zone Safety 0–10
- 00:56 BSU–Kyle Brotzman 45 Yd FG 0–13

3rd Quarter

- 10:39 BSU–D.J. Harper 1 Yd Run (Two–Point Pass Conversion Failed) 0–19
- 04:21 ORE–Jeremiah Masoli 5 Yd Run (Legarrette Blount Run For Two–Point Conversion) 8–19

After the game, Oregon RB LeGarrette Blount, who earlier in the week was quoted as saying, "We owe that team an ass-whuppin," punched Bronco DE Byron Hout in the chin/jaw after Hout had taunted him in front of Boise State head coach Chris Petersen who attempted to move Hout away from Blount before the hit. Blount then went after fans in the front row of the south end zone before being restrained and escorted off the field by security, police, Oregon coaches, and players. Blount was later suspended by the University of Oregon for the entire season (Blount would return to action in the Ducks season finale on December 3, 90 days after the Boise State incident). Blount issued an apology to everyone: the fans, the nation, and Boise State. Hout was not suspended. Head Coach Chris Petersen released the following statement: "The event that took place last night following our game between Byron and Oregon running back LeGarrette Blount was very unfortunate and we do not condone Byron's action. There will be disciplinary consequences for Bryon as a result of the incident last night and they will be handled internally."

=== Miami (OH) ===
	1	2	3	4	Total
RedHawks	0	0	0	0	0
#11 Broncos	14	6	14	14	48

First ever meeting. The RedHawks are scheduled to return to Boise in 2012. There are currently no future plans for Boise to play at Miami.

Boise State shutout a non-conference FBS school for the first time in school history by dominating Miami (OH) 48–0. The Broncos outgained the RedHawks 441 to 197. Kellen Moore went over 300 yards for the fifth time in his career and threw 4 touchdowns for the first time in his career. Austin Pettis and Titus Young both had over 110 yards receiving with longs of over 50 each and 3 combined touchdowns. The Broncos held their opponent to less than 40 yards rushing for the second consecutive week (Oregon: 31, Miami: 38) and forced 4 interceptions (Iloka, Johnson, Smith, Tevis). When asked about stopping the run, safety Jeron Johnson said, "That's the key to our defense is to stop the run game and make them pass. We have a good secondary so we feel that we can hold our own in the passing game. If we can stop the run, we'll be in good shape". Kyle Brotzman missed his first ever extra point, ending his school record for consecutive PAT's at 118. The Broncos moved to #10 in both major polls following the win.

Passing Leaders	Rushing Leaders	Receiving Leaders	Defensive Leaders
Kellen Moore: 16/26, 307 YDS, 4 TDS, 1 INT	D.J. Harper: 13 CAR, 89 YDS, 1 TD, LG of 32	Titus Young: 6 REC, 114 YDS, 2 TDS, LG of 54	Kyle Wilson: 7 TOT TKL
	Doug Martin: 6 CAR, 28 YDS, 2 TDS	Austin Pettis: 4 REC, 115 YDS, 1 TD, LG of 65	Jeron Johnson: 5 TOT TKL, 1 INT

1st Quarter

- 07:16 BSU–Austin Pettis 17 Yd Pass From Kellen Moore (Kyle Brotzman Kick) 0–7
- 01:17 BSU–Tyler Shoemaker 15 Yd Pass From Kellen Moore (Kyle Brotzman Kick) 0–14

2nd Quarter

- 00:08 BSU–Titus Young 25 Yd Pass From Kellen Moore (Pat Failed) 0–20

3rd Quarter

- 07:09 BSU–D.J. Harper 3 Yd Run (Kyle Brotzman Kick) 0–27
- 02:11 BSU–Titus Young 54 Yd Pass From Kellen Moore (Kyle Brotzman Kick) 0–34

4th Quarter

- 09:46 BSU–Doug Martin 4 Yd Run (Kyle Brotzman Kick) 0–41
- 01:56 BSU–Doug Martin 2 Yd Run (Jimmy Pavel Kick) 0–48

=== Fresno State ===
	1	2	3	4	Total
#10 Broncos	10	14	10	17	51
Bulldogs	0	17	10	7	34

12th meeting. 7–4 all time. Last meeting in 2008, a 61–10 Broncos win in Boise.

An offensive explosion occurred in Fresno with the Broncos and Bulldogs combining for 987 yards, 1494 yards including return yards in a 51–34 Bronco win. Winston Venable opened the scoring with a 30-yard interception return for a touchdown on the Bulldogs opening drive. The Broncos would follow with a 32-yard Kyle Brotzman field goal to go up 10–0. A 60-yard touchdown run by D.J. Harper on the Broncos next possession was just a sampling of the fireworks that would follow. After a Fresno State field goal, Titus Young returned the following kickoff 77 yards to set up a 7-yard touchdown catch to him from Kelln Moore. The Broncos looked to be in complete control of the game at 24–3, but Ryan Mathews of Fresno State would answer with consecutive 69 and 60 yard touchdown runs to bring the Bulldogs within 7 at the half. The Broncos returned the opening kickoff of the 2nd half for a touchdown only to see it overturned on offsetting penalties for a block in the back and a personal foul, but Doug Martin would return the next kick 77 yards to set up a Brotzman field goal. The Bulldogs would drive and score a touchdown to bring the score to 27–24. The Broncos would follow with a 74-yard Jeremy Avery rush which was fumbled at the 1 yard line but recovered in the end zone for a Bronco touchdown by Titus Young. Fresno answered with a 17-play drive ending with a 27-yard field goal to end the 3rd quarter with a score of 34–27. In the first two minutes of the 4th quarter, Kellen Moore connected with Austin Pettis for an 8-yard touchdown catch, Ryan Mathews broke his third 60+ yard touchdown run of the night, this time 68 yards, then Jeremy Avery scored on a 67-yard screen pass to bring the score to 48–34. Following a 69-yard Jeremy Avery rush the Broncos added a late 24-yard field goal by Jimmy Pavel to end the scoring. The Broncos and Bulldogs combined for 8 plays of 60 yards or more with 2 being over 70. Despite the 17-point win, the Broncos gave up 507 yards. Boise State moved to #8 in both major polls, their highest regular-season ranking in school history to date.

Passing Leaders	Rushing Leaders	Receiving Leaders	Defensive Leaders
Kellen Moore: 18/26, 181 YDS, 3 TDS, LG of 67	Jeremy Avery: 11 CAR, 186 YDS, LG of 74	Jeremy Avery: 5 REC, 83 YDS, 1 TD, LG of 67	Winston Venable: 1 TKL, 1 INT for 30 YDS, 1 TD
	D.J. Harper: 12 CAR, 107 YDS, 1 TD, LG of 60	Austin Pettis: 5 REC, 34 YDS, 1 TD	Billy Winn: 6 TOT TKL, 1 SACK, 3 TFL of 10 YDS

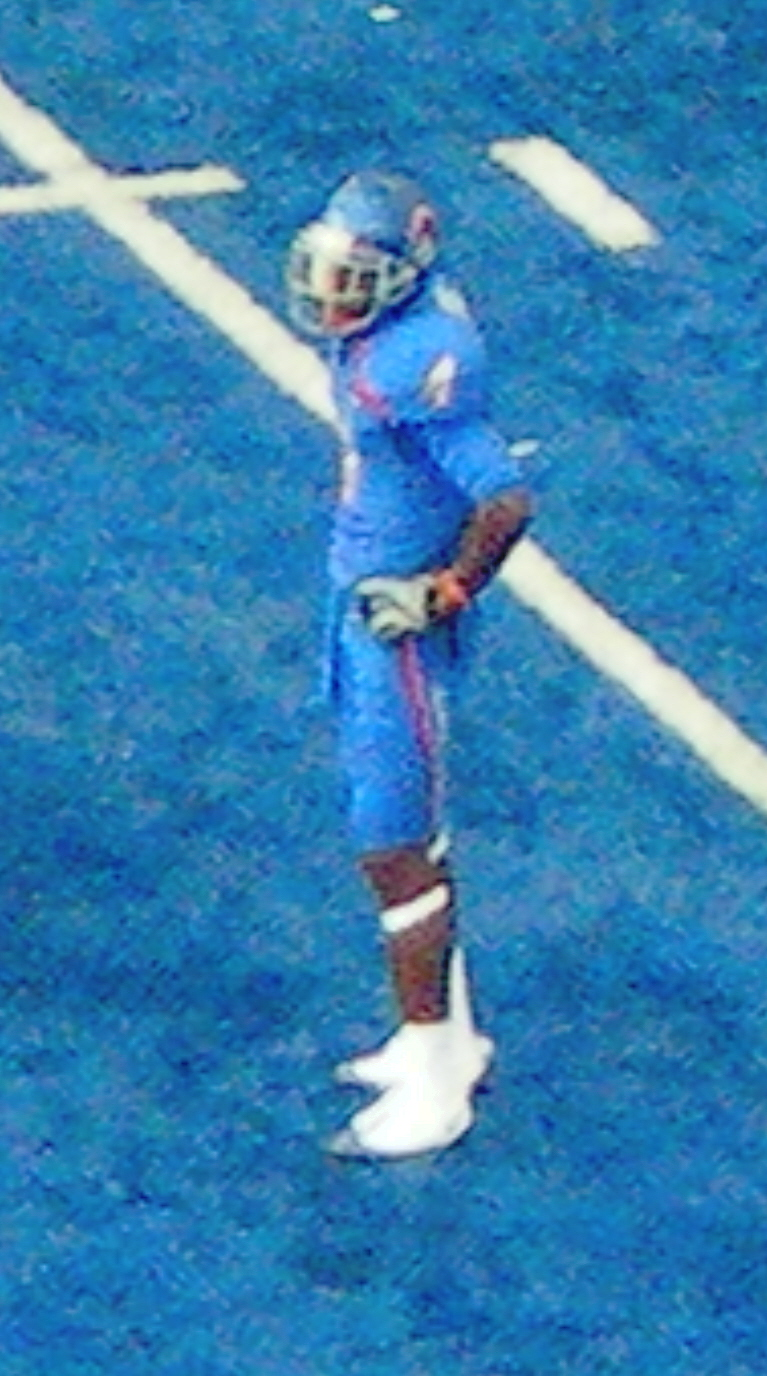
Titus Young was named WAC special teams player of the week.

1st Quarter

- 13:05 BSU–Winston Venable 30 Yd Interception Return (Kyle Brotzman kick) 7–0
- 08:49 BSU–Kyle Brotzman 32 Yd FG 10–0

2nd Quarter

- 12:28 BSU–D.J. Harper 60 Yd Run (Kyle Brotzman Kick) 17–0
- 09:44 FRES–Kevin Goessling 37 Yd FG 17–3
- 07:49 BSU–Titus Young 7 Yd Pass From Kellen Moore (Kyle Brotzman Kick) 24–3
- 07:33 FRES–Ryan Mathews 69 Yd Run (Kevin Goessling Kick) 24–10
- 04:58 FRES–Ryan Mathews 60 Yd Run (Kevin Goessling Kick) 24–17

3rd Quarter

- 12:28 BSU–Kyle Brotzman 30 Yd FG 27–17
- 11:39 FRES–Devon Wylie 21 Yd Pass From Ryan Colburn (Kevin Goessling Kick) 27–24
- 10:44 BSU–Titus Young Recovered Fumble In End Zone (Kyle Brotzman Kick) 34–24
- 03:12 FRES–Kevin Goessling 27 Yd FG 34–27

4th Quarter

- 14:14 BSU–Austin Pettis 8 yd pass From Kellen Moore (Jimmy Pavel Kick) 41–27
- 13:26 FRES–Ryan Mathews 68 yd run (Kevin Goessling Kick) 41–34
- 13:00 BSU–Jeremy Avery 67 yd pass From Kellen Moore (Jimmy Pavel Kick) 48–34
- 04:00 BSU–Jimmy Pavel 24 yd FG 51–34

Both Fresno State and Boise State wore "D.B." decals on their helmets to honor Dan Brown, former Boise State linebacker (1978–1981) and former Fresno State defensive coordinator (2002–2008), who died from brain cancer on March 15, 2009. Junior wide receiver Titus Young was selected as the WAC Special Teams Player of the Week for returning five kickoffs for 154 yards with a long of 77. Junior running back D.J. Harper, the Broncos leading rusher through three games, tore his left ACL against Fresno State and missed the rest of the season. Harper applied for, and was granted, a medical redshirt.

=== Bowling Green ===
	1	2	3	4	Total
#8 Broncos	0	29	14	6	49
Falcons	0	0	14	0	14

3rd meeting. 2–0 all time. Last meeting in 2008, a 20–7 Broncos win in Boise.

The Broncos made a rare trip to the Eastern time zone and walked away with a victory against a MAC team for the second time this season with a 49–14 win over Bowling Green. After a scoreless first quarter, the Broncos ran off 22 points in a span of 2:47 in the second quarter with two Titus Young TD runs (18, 25) and a Doug Martin TD run (34). The Broncos first six scoring drives all took only four plays or less. Kellen Moore threw for 195 yards in the second quarter and finished 17/21 for 247 and 2 TDs before leaving the game midway through the third quarter. Jeremy Avery got his first rushing TD of the season in impressive fashion with a 71-yard run in the third. The Broncos gained a total of 529 yards. The Broncos once again set a school record by climbing to #5 in all major polls, including the Harris poll which debuted this week.

Passing Leaders	Rushing Leaders	Receiving Leaders	Defensive Leaders
Kellen Moore: 17/21, 247 YDS, 2 TDS, LG of 31	Doug Martin: 13 CAR, 116 YDS, 1 TD, LG of 34	Titus Young: 6 REC, 58 YDS, LG of 16	Jeron Johnson: 7 TOT TKL, 1 INT for 5 YDS
	Jeremy Avery: 12 CAR, 196 YDS, 1 TD, LG of 71	Tyler Shoemaker: 4 REC, 105 YDS, LG of 31	Brandyn Thompson: 4 TOT TKL, 1 INT for 15 YDS
	Titus Young: 2 CAR, 43 YDS, 2 TDS, LG of 25	Austin Pettis: 3 REC, 32 YDS, 1 TD, LG of 17	Ryan Winterswyk: 4 TOT TKL, 2 TFL of 11 YDS, 1 SACK

2nd Quarter

- 14:53 BSU–Titus Young 18 Yd Run (Austin Pettis Pass To Richie Brockel For Two–Point Conversion) 8–0
- 12:45 BSU–Doug Martin 34 Yd Run (Kyle Brotzman Kick) 15–0
- 12:27 BSU–Titus Young 25 Yd Run (Kyle Brotzman Kick) 22–0
- 02:15 BSU–Austin Pettis 17 Yd Pass From Kellen Moore (Kyle Brotzman Kick) 29–0

3rd Quarter

- 14:27 BSU–Jeremy Avery 71 Yd Run (Kyle Brotzman Kick) 36–0
- 13:41 BSU–Richie Brockel 2 Yd Pass From Kellen Moore (Kyle Brotzman Kick) 43–0
- 07:46 BGSU–Adrian Hodges 7 Yd Pass From Tyler Sheehan (Jerry Phillips Kick) 43–7
- 01:01 BGSU–Tyler Sheehan 6 Yd Run (Jerry Phillips Kick) 43–14

4th Quarter

- 06:11 BSU–Jarvis Hodge 1 Yd Run (Pat Failed) 49–14

=== UC Davis ===
	1	2	3	4	Total
Aggies	0	0	10	6	16
#5 Broncos	0	13	14	7	34

4th meeting. 3–0 all time. Last meeting 1985, a 13–9 Broncos win in Boise. Boise State head coach Chris Petersen was quarterback for UC Davis in the last meeting.

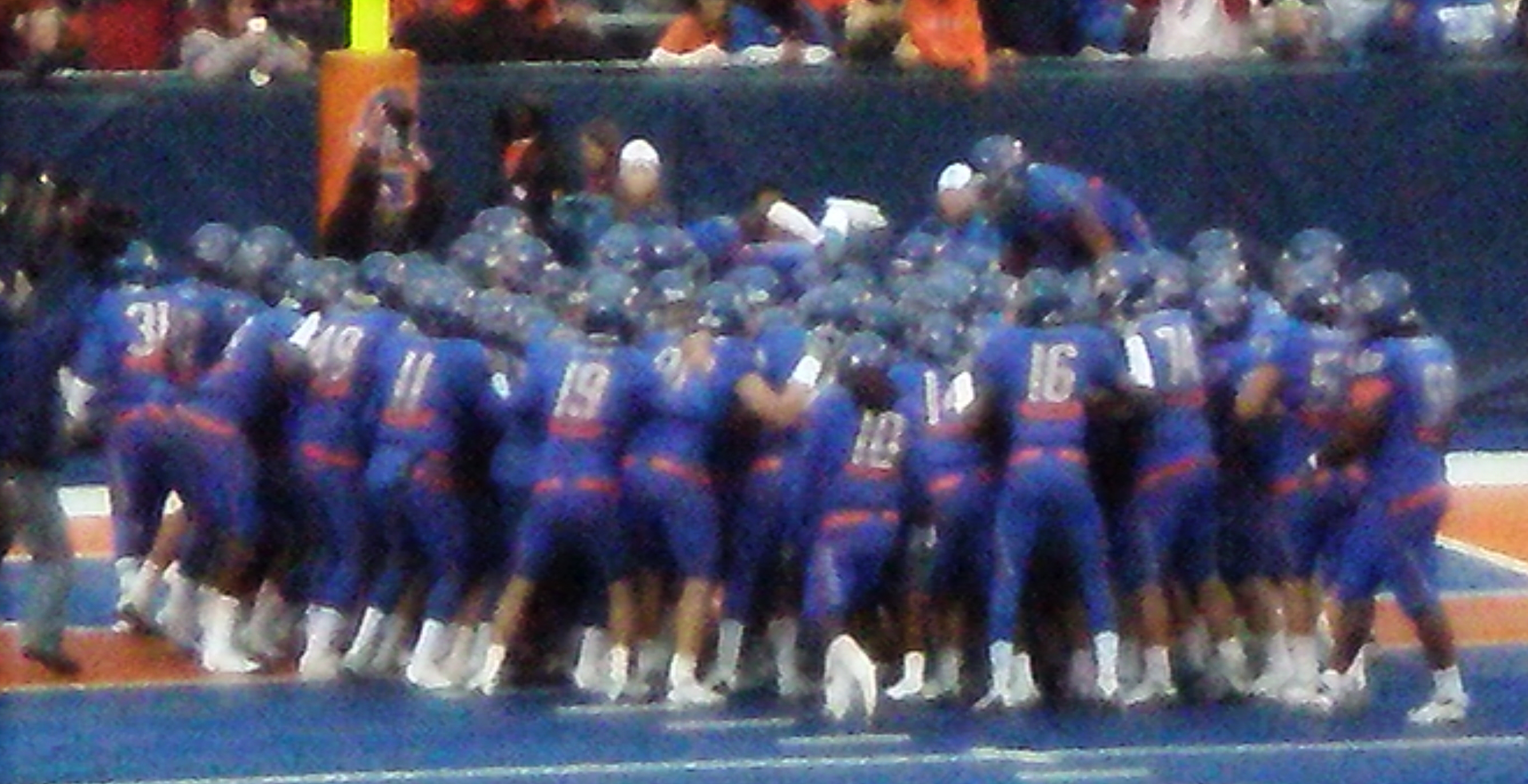
Boise State players during pregame

It was a game that was much closer than was expected as UC Davis of the FCS gave the Broncos all they could handle in a 34–16 Bronco win in a cold, rain-soaked, tension-filled Bronco Stadium. The Aggies held the Broncos scoreless in the first quarter and held them on a 4th and goal at the 1 yard line to give them momentum for the rest of the game. The Broncos did manage to be up 13–0 at half time on two Kyle Brotzman FGs and a Kellen Moore to Austin Pettis TD pass, but UC Davis hung close in the second half with scores of 20–10 and 27–16 before a late Doug Martin TD sealed the win for the Broncos. Austin Pettis had a career-high of 10 receptions for 129 yards and two TDs. Ryan Winterswyk recorded a sack for the third straight game and blocked a field goal right before halftime. The Bronco defense was without their captain Kyle Wilson who missed the game with a shoulder injury. The lackluster performance by the Broncos contributed to them dropping in the AP and Coaches polls to #6, but they did remain #5 in the Harris poll.

Passing Leaders	Rushing Leaders	Receiving Leaders	Defensive Leaders
Kellen Moore: 22/31, 285 YDS, 3 TDS, 1 INT	Jeremy Avery: 15 CAR, 70 YDS	Austin Pettis: 10 REC, 129 YDS, 2 TD, LG of 28	Jeron Johnson: 7 TOT TKL, 2 PBU
	Doug Martin: 16 CAR, 41 YDS, 1 TD	Titus Young: 6 REC, 83 YDS, 1 TD, LG of 42	Aaron Tevis: 6 TOT TKL, 2 TFL of 5 YDS

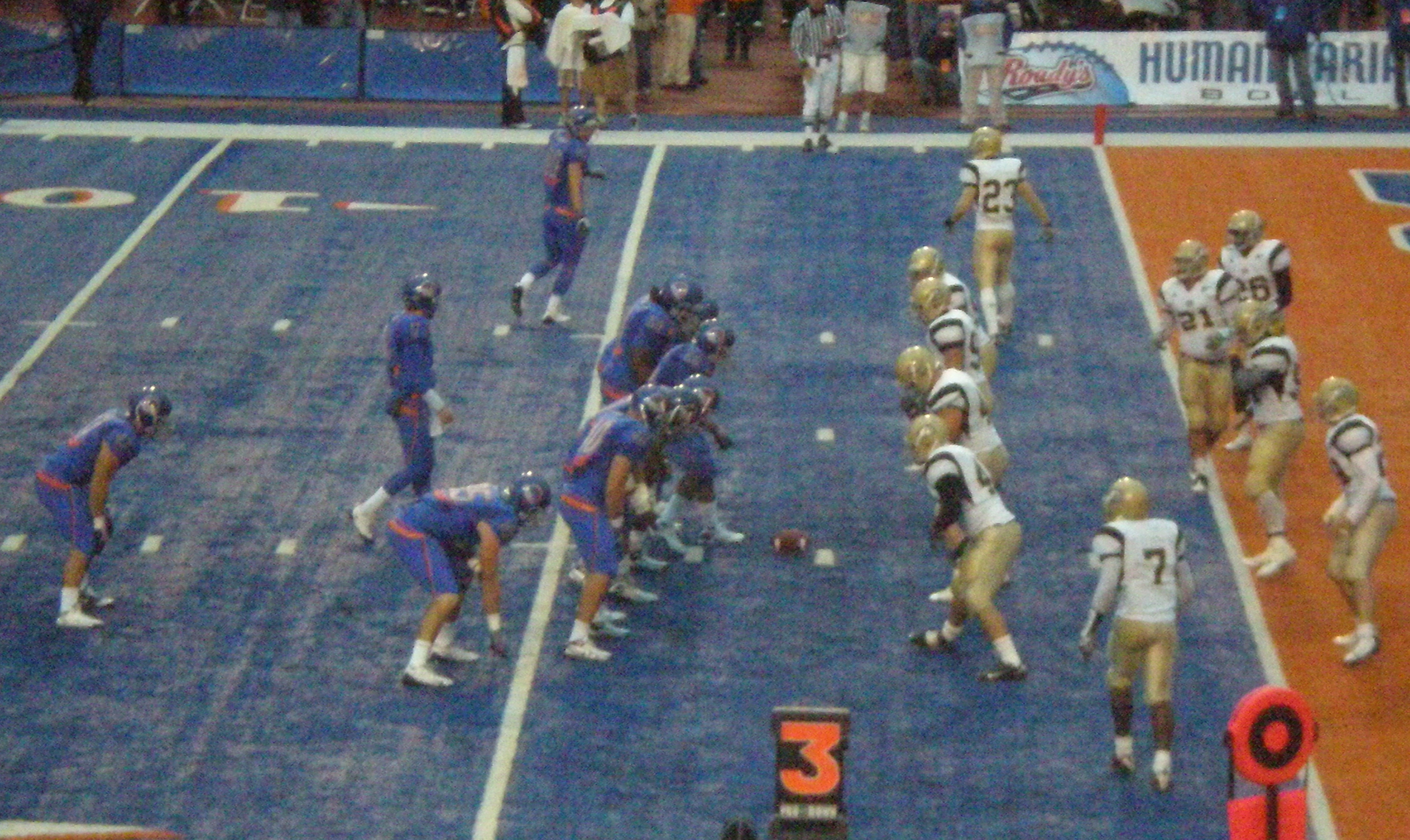
Boise State inside the 5 yard line in the 2nd quarter.

2nd Quarter

- 10:17 BSU–Kyle Brotzman 22 Yd FG 0–3
- 04:36 BSU–Kyle Brotzman 36 Yd FG 0–6
- 00:52 BSU–Austin Pettis 6 Yd Pass From Kellen Moore (Kyle Brotzman Kick) 0–13

3rd Quarter

- 12:40 UCD–Sean Kelley 48 yd FG 3–13
- 11:51 BSU–Titus Young 42 yd Pass From Kellen Moore (Kyle Brotzman Kick) 3–20
- 09:20 UCD–Sean Creadick 21 yd Pass From Greg Denham (Sean Kelley Kick) 10–20
- 03:33 BSU–Austin Pettis 2 yd Pass From Kellen Moore (Kyle Brotzman Kick) 10–27

4th Quarter

- 11:27 UCD–Sean Creadick 4 Yd Pass From Greg Denham (Pat Failed) 16–27
- 00:38 BSU–Doug Martin 4 Yd Run (Kyle Brotzman Kick) 16–34

Following their bye week the Broncos moved back to #5 in the AP poll and remained at #6 in the Coaches poll and #5 in the Harris poll.

=== Tulsa ===
	1	2	3	4	Total
#6 Broncos	8	10	10	0	28
Golden Hurricane	14	0	0	7	21

5th meeting. 4–0 all time. Last meeting in 2004, a 45–42 Broncos win in Tulsa. Tulsa is scheduled to play at Boise in 2011.

Big plays kept Tulsa in the game, but the Broncos were able to hang on to remain undefeated with a 28–21 win. The Broncos gave up points in the 1st quarter for the first time this season and had their first deficit of the season. Tulsa connected on long TD passes of 55 and 53 yards. The Broncos tried to answer with their own big plays, but could not connect twice on long passes to Titus Young. Instead the Broncos moved the ball with a steady dose of Doug Martin (112 YDS) and Jeremy Avery (73 YDS) on the ground to set up 3 short Kellen Moore TD passes (8,17,2), 2 to Tommy Gallarda. Tulsa held the Broncos in the redzone twice leading to 2 Kyle Brotzman field goals (27,18). Tulsa had the ball with a chance to score to tie the game but were unable to convert on a 4th down with 37 seconds to play. The Bronco defense came up with 13 tackles for loss and 5 sacks, 2 by Ryan Winterswyk, bringing his season total to 5. The Broncos would fall in the AP poll to #6 but rose to #5 in the Coaches poll and debuted at #4 in the BCS poll, their highest ranking in any major poll in school history.

Passing Leaders	Rushing Leaders	Receiving Leaders	Defensive Leaders
Kellen Moore: 22/33, 187 YDS, 3 TDS	Doug Martin: 23 CAR, 112 YDS, LG of 19	Austin Pettis: 4 REC, 63 YDS, 1 TD, LG of 28	Jeron Johnson: 8 TOT TKL
	Jeremy Avery: 16 CAR, 73 YDS, LG of 16	Tommy Gallarda: 3 REC, 15 YDS, 2 TDS	Ryan Winterswyk: 3 TFL of 9 YDS, 2 SACKS

1st Quarter

- 08:25 TLSA–Damaris Johnson 53 Yd Pass From A.J. Whitmore (Kevin Fitzpatrick Kick) 0–7
- 04:00 BSU–Tommy Gallarda 8 Yd Pass From Kellen Moore (Austin Pettis Pass To Kyle Efaw For Two–Point Conversion) 8–7
- 00:16 TLSA–Trae Johnson 15 Yd Pass From G.J. Kinne (Kevin Fitzpatrick Kick) 8–14

2nd Quarter

- 11:03 BSU–Austin Pettis 17 Yd Pass From Kellen Moore (Kyle Brotzman Kick) 15–14
- 00:36 BSU–Kyle Brotzman 27 Yd FG 18–14

3rd Quarter

- 09:44 BSU–Tommy Gallarda 2 Yd Pass From Kellen Moore (Kyle Brotzman Kick) 25–14
- 02:54 BSU–Kyle Brotzman 18 Yd FG 28–14

4th Quarter

- 09:29 TLSA–Slick Shelley 55 Yd Pass From G.J. Kinne (Kevin Fitzpatrick Kick) 28–21

=== Hawaii ===
	1	2	3	4	Total
#4 Broncos	10	24	10	10	54
Warriors	0	0	2	7	9

11th meeting. 7–3 all time. Last meeting in 2008, a 27–7 Broncos win in Boise.

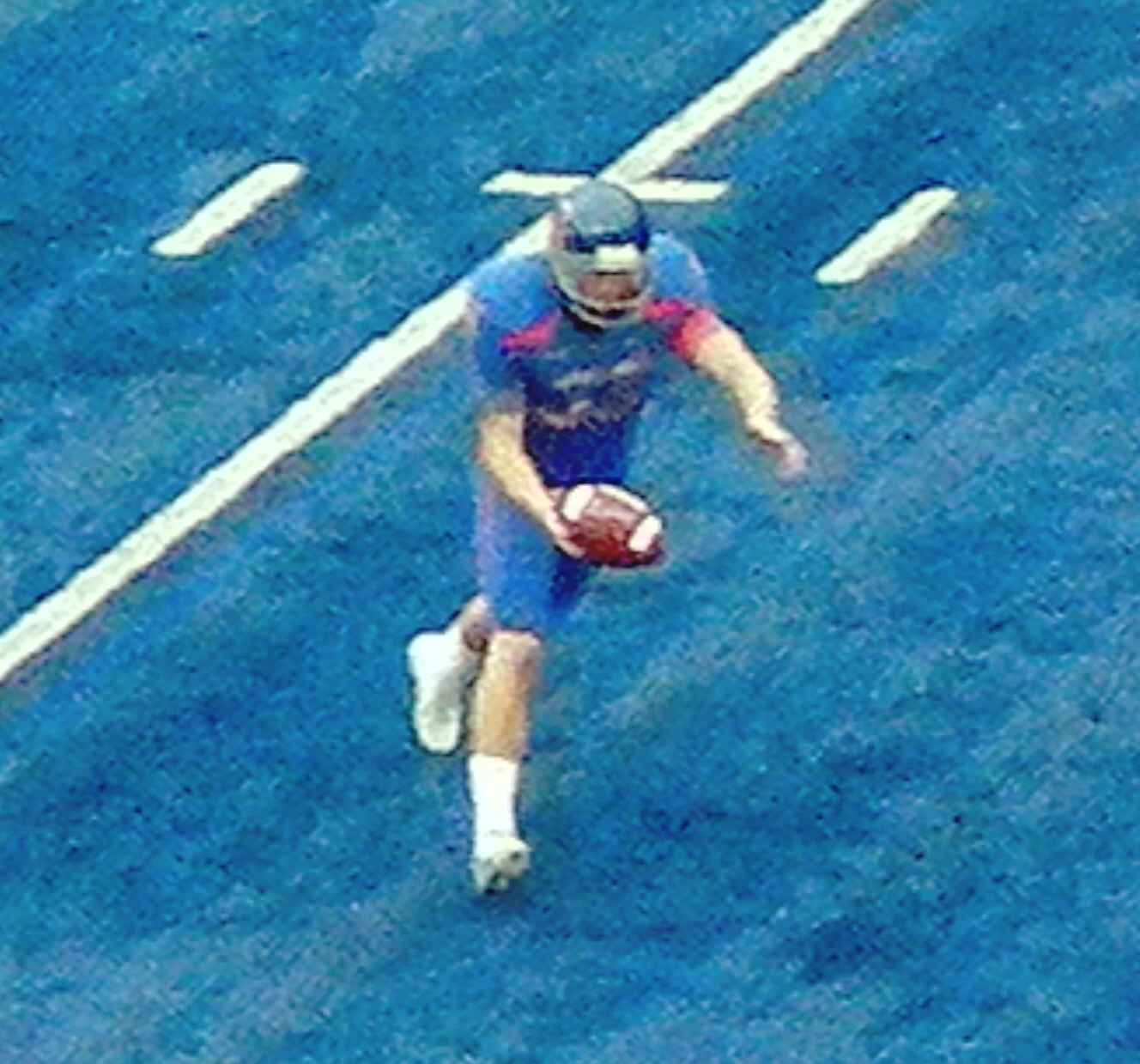
Kyle Brotzman was selected as WAC special teams player of the week.

Boise State had lost their last two trips to the islands in 2007, but this game was never in doubt as the Broncos beat the Warriors for the 8th time in 9 years as a member of the WAC. Kellen Moore had a career-high 5 TD passes (35, 14, 24, 10, 48) going 18/30 for 223 yards. Titus Young caught 8 passes for 115 yards and 3 TDS. Freshman running back Matt Kaiserman, who had been hurt the entire season, made his Bronco debut and ran for 122 yards, 51 of those on the Broncos final drive alone where he carried the ball on all 11 plays to lead to his first career TD. The score could have been much worse than it was, but Hawaii was able to force the Broncos to attempt 5 field goals, 4 of which Kyle Brotzman made (25, 28, 32, 27). The Bronco defence force 3 INTS, 2 by Jeron Johnson, and 3 fumble recoveries. The Broncos did continue to have center to quarterback exchange problems which led to 6 fumbles, all of which they did recover, and center Thomas Byrd was replaced by Garret Pendergast, but Pendergast snapped a ball into the end zone which led to a Hawaii safety. The Broncos remained the same in the AP (#6) and the two human BCS polls (Coaches #5, Harris #5), but their BCS computer poll average fell from #5 to #8 to bring their BCS ranking to #7.

Passing Leaders	Rushing Leaders	Receiving Leaders	Defensive Leaders
Kellen Moore: 18/30, 223 YDS, 5 TDS, LG of 48	Matt Kaiserman: 23 CAR, 122 YDS, 1 TD, LG of 16	Titus Young: 8 REC, 115 YDS, 3 TDS, LG of 48	Jeron Johnson: 1 TKL, 2 INTS for 25 YDS, 1 FR, 1 PBU
	Jeremy Avery: 11 CAR, 72 YDS, LG of 21	Austin Pettis: 4 REC, 49 YDS, 1 TD, Lg of 19	Winston Venable: 6 TOT TKL, 1 TFL of 1 YD, 1 FF, 1 PBU

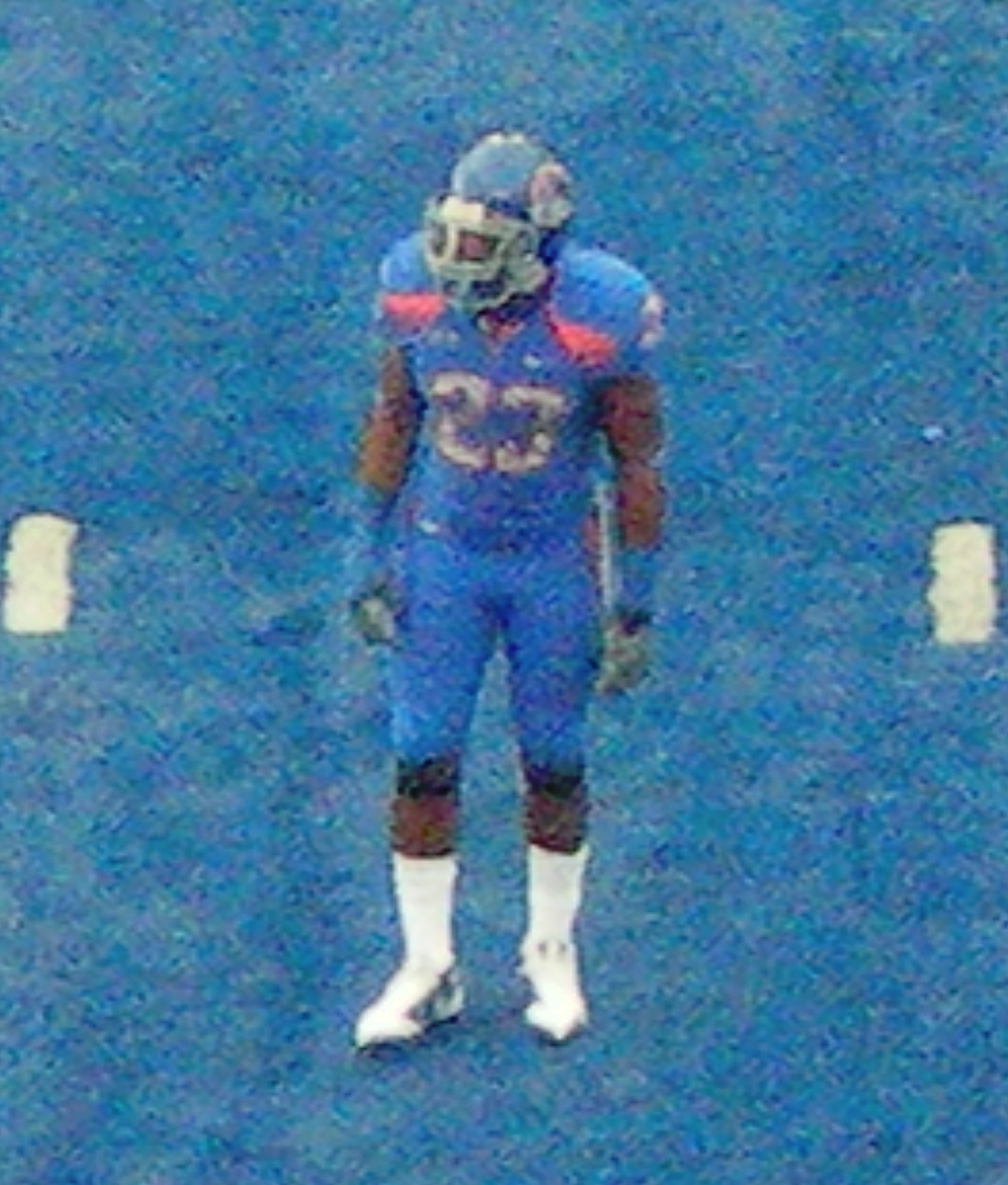
Jeron Johnson was selected as WAC defensive player of the week.

1st Quarter

- 11:54 BSU–Kyle Brotzman 25 Yd FG 3–0
- 07:08 BSU–Tyler Shoemaker 35 Yd Pass From Kellen Moore (Kyle Brotzman Kick) 10–0

2nd Quarter

- 13:32 BSU–Austin Pettis 14 Yd Pass From Kellen Moore (Kyle Brotzman Kick) 17–0
- 07:33 BSU–Titus Young 24 Yd Pass From Kellen Moore (Kyle Brotzman Kick) 24–0
- 01:22 BSU–Titus Young 10 Yd Pass From Kellen Moore (Kyle Brotzman Kick) 31–0
- 00:17 BSU–Kyle Brotzman 28 Yd FG 34–0

3rd Quarter

- 08:02 BSU–Kyle Brotzman 32 Yd FG 37–0
- 06:59 BSU–Titus Young 48 Yd Pass From Kellen Moore (Kyle Brotzman Kick) 44–0
- 05:52 HAW–Kellen Moore Tackled By Team In End Zone (Safety) 44–2

4th Quarter

- 14:54 BSU–Kyle Brotzman 27 Yd FG 47–2
- 09:50 HAW–Jon Medeiros 10 Yd Pass From Shane Austin (Scott Enos Kick) 47–9
- 03:08 BSU–Matt Kaiserman 1 Yd Run (Kyle Brotzman Kick) 54–9

On October 26 Jeron Johnson was named the WAC defensive player of the week for his 2 interceptions and 1 fumble recovery and Kyle Brotzman was named the WAC special teams player of the week for going 4–5 on field goals and having a 72-yard punt, which is the longest punt in the WAC so far this season. Brotzman also completed a 28-yard pass on a fake punt.

=== San Jose State ===
	1	2	3	4	Total
Spartans	0	7	0	0	7
#7 Broncos	7	17	14	7	45

10th meeting. 9–0 all time. Last meeting in 2008, a 33–16 Broncos win in San Jose.

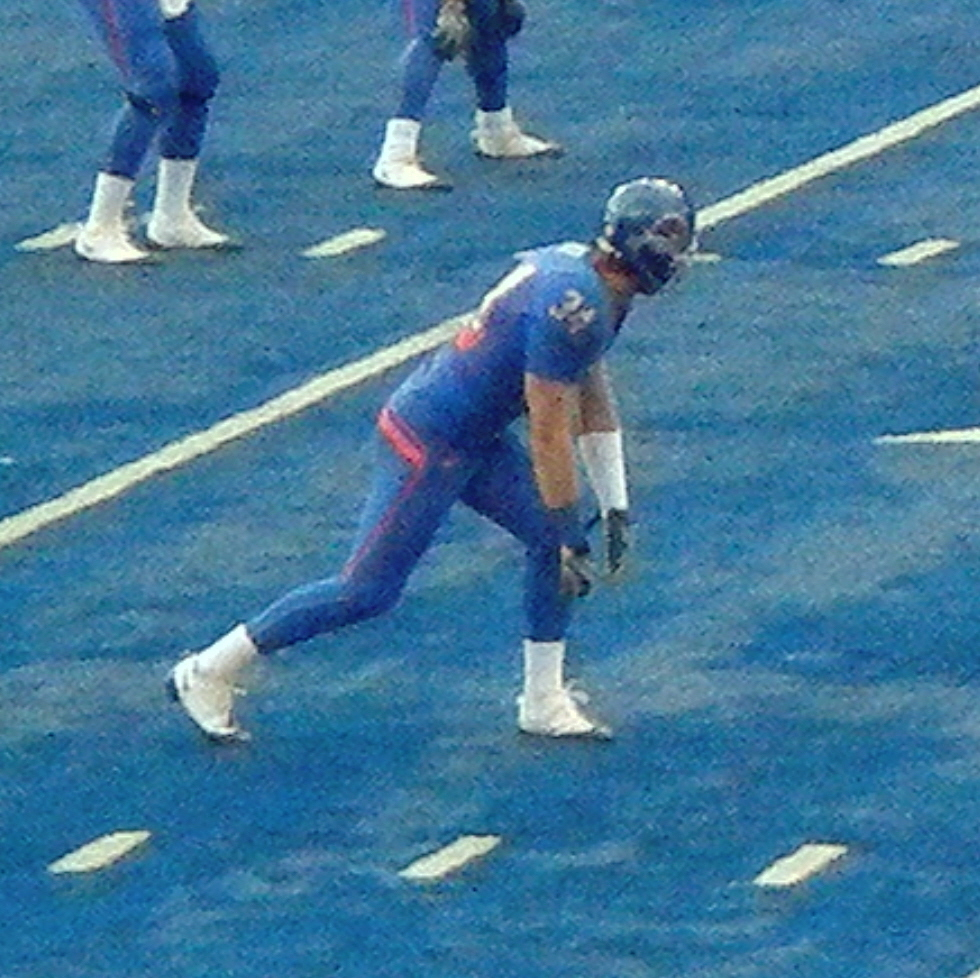
Kirby Moore had a 61 YD TD for his first career TD

The Broncos cruised to their 20th straight regular season win to remain undefeated on the season with a 45–7 win over San Jose State. The Broncos opened the game with a 61-yard touchdown pass from Kellen Moore to his brother Kirby Moore for Kirby's first career TD. When asked about the brother to brother connection, Boise State head coach Chris Petersen said, "When that happened on the sideline, I think everyone just had a smile on their face. It's so hard to play Division I football and then to be able to do that with your brother is something that is really special. I just think that that's a special thing to play college football with your brother, and when you hook up for a big play like that, and hopefully they'll be many more down the road." Boise State led only 10–7 with less the a minute left in the 1st half until Kellen Moore found Mitch Burroughs on an 18-yard TD pass then scored on a Moore 1 yard TD run after a San Jose fumble to lead 24–7 at halftime. Austin Pettis caught an 8-yard TD pass to open the 3rd quarter and now has a touchdown reception in all 8 games this season. Kyle Wilson returned an interception 27 yards for the defence's 2nd TD of the year. A late Doug Martin TD run capped off the Bronco scoring. Kellen Moore added 3 more TD passes and now has 24 with only 2 INT's. The Broncos moved up in the AP (#5) and Harris polls (#4 including 1 first place vote) and remained the same in the Coache's (#5) and BCS (#7).

Passing Leaders	Rushing Leaders	Receiving Leaders	Defensive Leaders
Kellen Moore: 21/33, 278 YDS, 3 TDS, LG of 61	Doug Martin: 6 CAR, 63 YDS, 1 TD, LG of 36	Kirby Moore: 4 REC, 80 YDS, 1 TD, LG of 61	Kyle Wilson: 5 TOT TKLS, 1 INTS for 27 YDS, 1 TD
	Jeremy Avery: 13 CAR, 64 YDS, LG of 38	Austin Pettis: 5 REC, 63 YDS, 1 TD, Lg of 23	Ryan Winterswyk: 1 SACK loss of 11

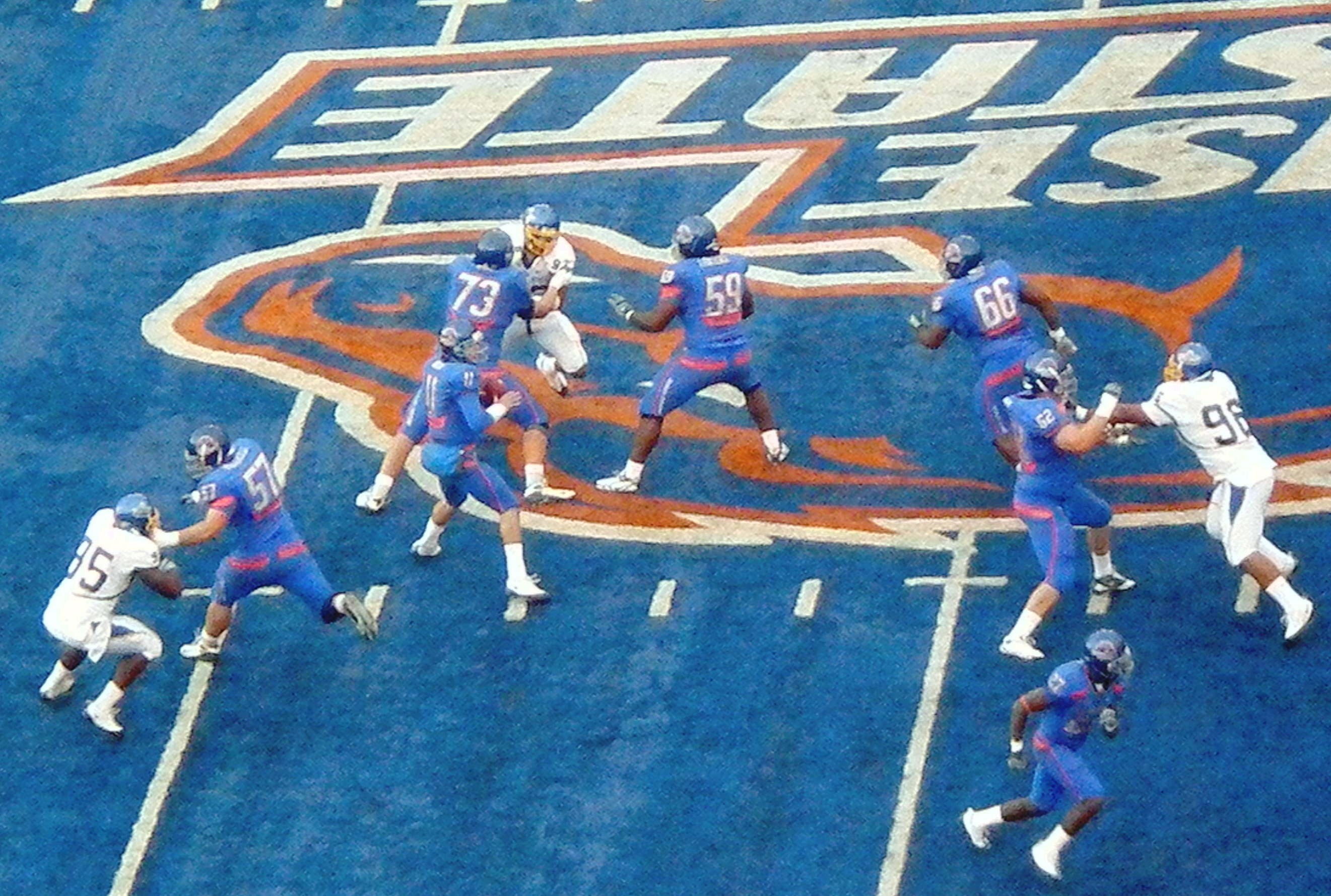
Boise State offensive line protecting Kellen Moore in the 1st half.

1st Quarter

- 09:32 BSU–Kirby Moore 61 Yd Pass From Kellen Moore (Kyle Brotzman Kick) 0–7

2nd Quarter

- 11:28 SJSU–Marquis Avery 11 Yd Pass From Jordan La Secla (Tyler Cope Kick) 7–7
- 07:00 BSU–Kyle Brotzman 32 Yd FG 7–10
- 00:44 BSU–Mitch Burroughs 18 Yd Pass From Kellen Moore (Kyle Brotzman Kick) 7–17
- 00:03 BSU–Kellen Moore 1 Yd Run (Kyle Brotzman Kick) 7–24

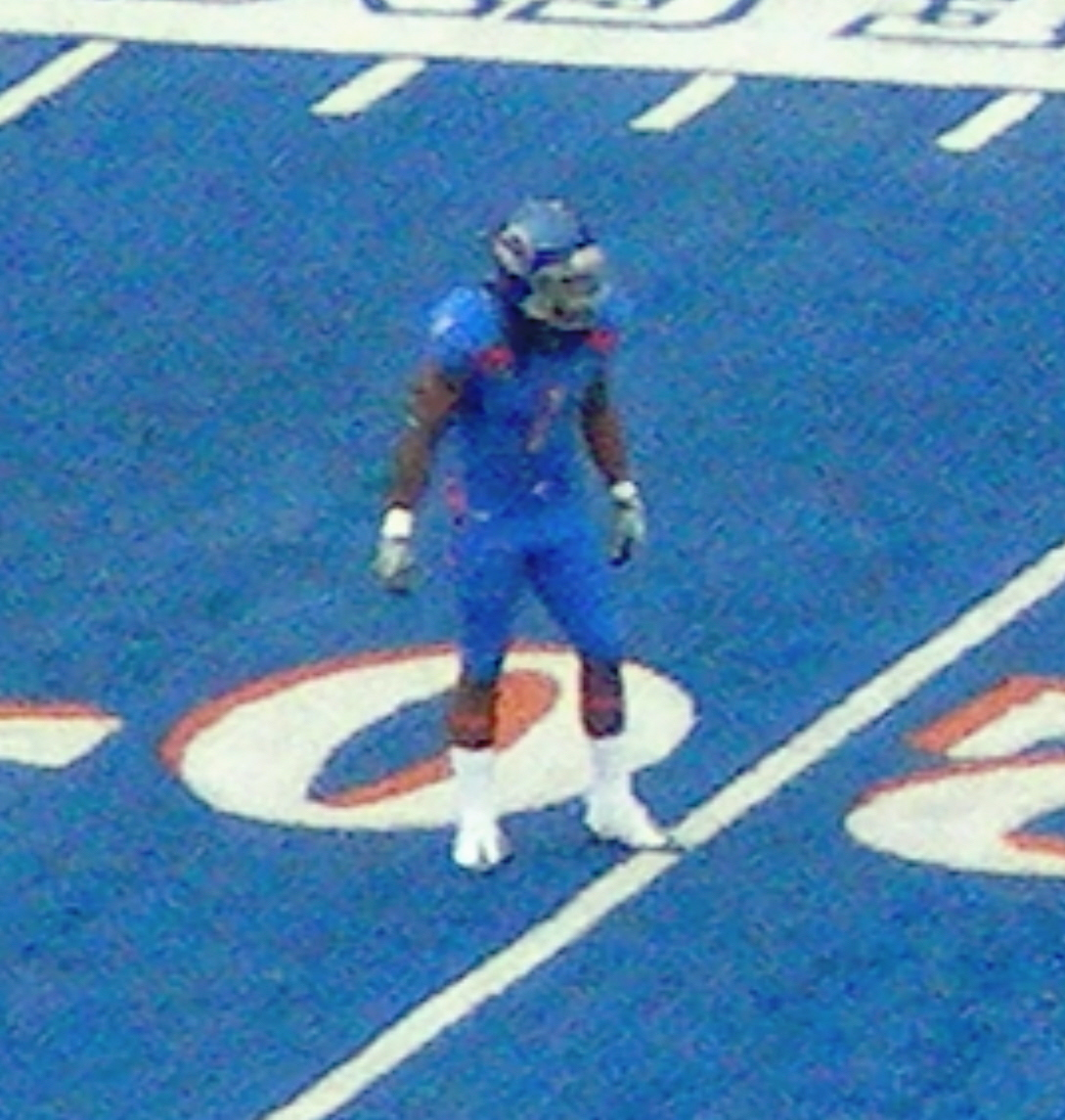
Kyle Wilson was named WAC defensive player of the week

3rd Quarter

- 10:22 BSU–Austin Pettis 8 Yd Pass From Kellen Moore (Kyle Brotzman Kick) 7–31
- 09:26 BSU–Kyle Wilson 27 Yd Interception Return (Kyle Brotzman Kick) 7–38

4th Quarter

- 00:20 BSU–Doug Martin 36 Yd Run (Kyle Brotzman Kick) 7–45

On November 2, Kyle Wilson was named the WAC defensive player of the week after his first career interception return for a touchdown and recording 5 tackles with 1 for a loss of 2 yards.

=== Louisiana Tech ===
	1	2	3	4	Total
#7 Broncos	13	14	3	15	45
Bulldogs	7	0	14	14	35

12th meeting. 7–4 all time. Last meeting in 2008, a 35–3 Broncos win in Boise.

Boise State mostly plays close games when they travel to Ruston, Louisiana like in 2009 as the Broncos had to hold on late for a 45–35 win against the Bulldogs. The Broncos took an early lead; a 20 point difference of 27–7 at halftime with the help of big plays from Titus Young (40 yard touchdown reception) and Kyle Wilson (59 yard punt return to the 3 to set up a Doug Martin TD). But the players started making major mistakes as Kellen Moore was intercepted and returned 75 yards for a TD and Kyle Brotzman missed 2 of his 5 field goals (29, 34, 25 made. 44, 31 missed). Tech got to a close 30–28 before the Kellen Moore connected with Austin Pettis for a 12-yard TD and Jeremy Avery broke a 44-yard TD run to extend the lead to 45–28. Tech would add a late TD to bring final to 45–35. Kellen Moore threw for a season high 354 yards and added 3 more TDs to bring his total to 27 on the season with only 3 INTs. Austin Pettis now has a TD catch in all 9 games this season and has 10 total for the year. Kyle Wilson recorded his second INT in as many weeks. The Broncos would fall in the Coaches, AP and Harris polls but rose one spot in the BCS to now be ranked #6 in every poll.

Passing Leaders	Rushing Leaders	Receiving Leaders	Defensive Leaders
Kellen Moore: 28/41, 354 YDS, 3 TDS, 1 INT, LG of 40	Jeremy Avery: 25 CAR, 146 YDS, 1 TD, LG of 44	Autin Pettis: 9 REC, 105 YDS, 1 TD, LG of 20	Kyle Wilson: 3 TOT TKLS, 1 INT
	Doug Martin: 4 CAR, 2 YDS, 1 TD	Titus Young: 8 REC, 110 YDS, 1 TD, LG of 40	Jeron Johnson: 12 TOT TKLS

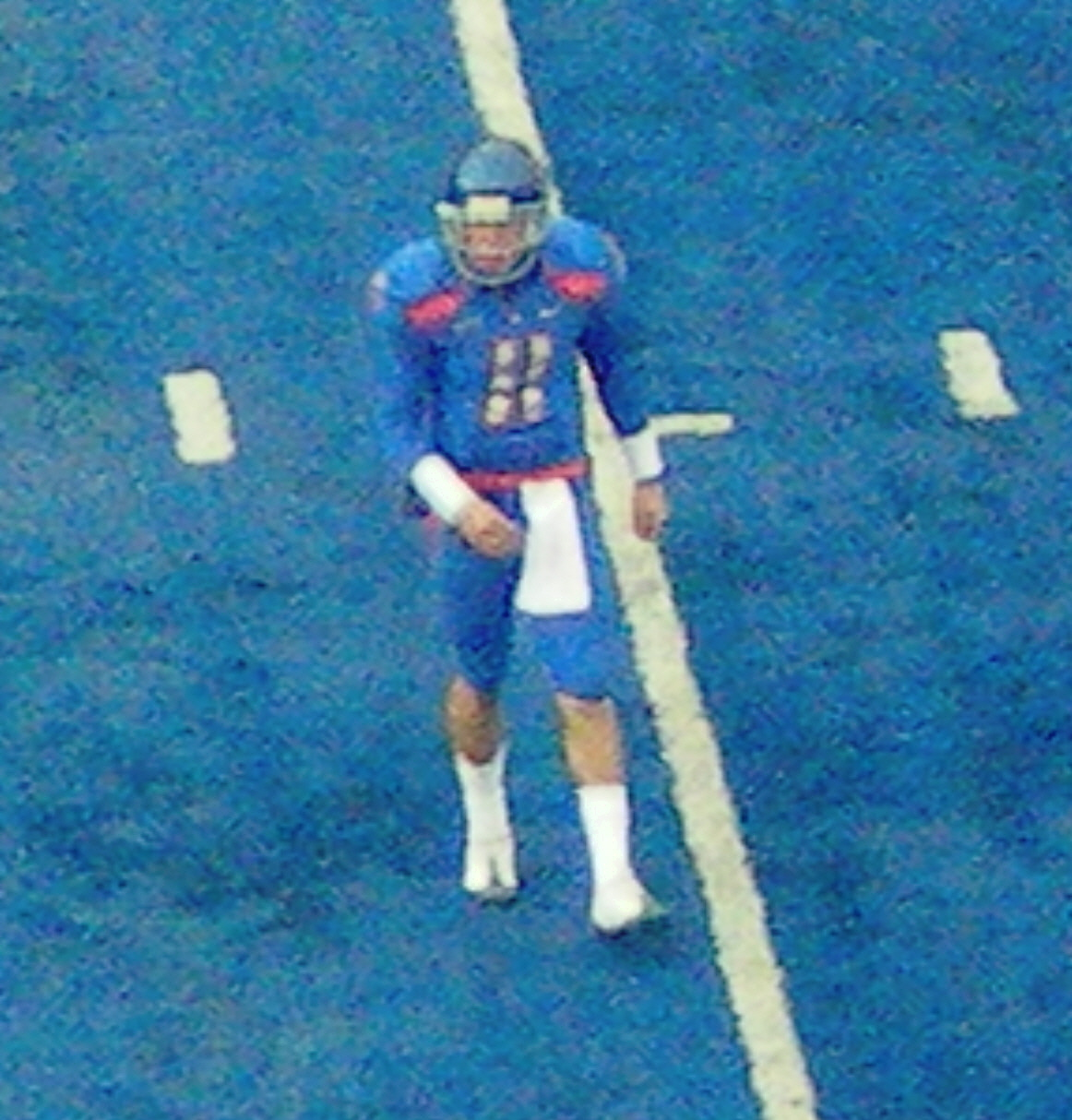
Kellen Moore had a season high 354 yards and 3 TDs.

1st Quarter

- 10:57 BSU–Kyle Brotzman 29 Yd FG 3–0
- 08:14 LT–Daniel Porter 1 Yd Run (Matt Nelson Kick) 3–7
- 05:03 BSU–Kyle Brotzman 34 Yd FG 6–7
- 00:44 BSU–Richie Brockel 2 Yd Pass From Kellen Moore (Kyle Brotzman Kick) 13–7

2nd Quarter

- 13:52 BSU–Doug Martin 2 Yd Run (Kyle Brotzman Kick) 20–7
- 07:35 BSU–Titus Young 40 Yd Pass From Kellen Moore (Kyle Brotzman Kick) 27–7

3rd Quarter

- 13:12 LT–Josh Victorian 75 Yd Interception Return (Matt Nelson Kick) 27–14
- 00:31 BSU–Kyle Brotzman 25 Yd FG 30–14
- 01:30 LT–Ross Jenkins 9 Yd Run (Matt Nelson Kick) 30–21

4th Quarter

- 14:07 LT–Dennis Morris 5 Yd Pass From Ross Jenkins (Matt Nelson Kick) 30–28
- 07:41 BSU–Austin Pettis 12 Yd Pass From Kellen Moore (Kellen Moore Pass To Tyler Shoemaker For Two-Point Conversion) 38–28
- 04:52 BSU–Jeremy Avery 44 Yd Run (Kyle Brotzman Kick) 45–28
- 02:49 LT–Myke Compton 1 Yd Run (Matt Nelson Kick) 45–35

=== Idaho ===
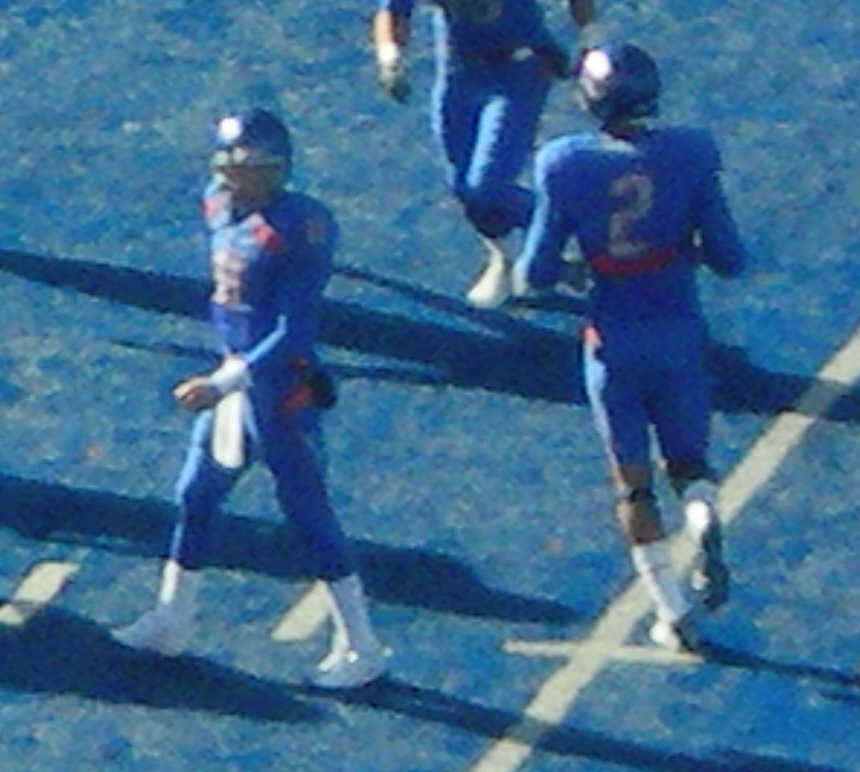
Kellen Moore (left) and Austin Pettis (right) connected on 4 TD passes

	1	2	3	4	Total
Vandals	7	10	0	8	25
#6 Broncos	21	21	14	7	63

39th meeting. 20–17–1 all time. Last meeting in 2008, a 45–10 Broncos win in Moscow.

The Broncos won their 11th straight game against their in-state rival to remain undefeated on the season with a 63–25 win. The Vandals came into the game with high hopes after winning 7 of their first 10 games, but the Broncos ended the Vandals hopes early with 4 first half Kellen Moore TD passes (4, 25, 8, 20), 3 of which went to Austin Pettis. Add a 1 YD TD run by Jeremy Avery and a 100+ yard Titus Young kickoff return for a TD to bring the Broncos lead to 42–17 at halftime. Kyle Wilson opened the second half scoring by returning an INT 71 yards for his second TD return of the season. Matt Kaiserman found Kyle Efaw for an 11 YD halfback pass TD before Moore found Pettis for a TD for the 4th time (14 YDS). Kellen Moore finished 22/32 for 299 and 5 TDS to bring his season total to 32 with only 3 INTS. Austin Pettis finished with 8 Receptions for 123 YDS and 4 TDS, brought his TD streak to 10 games and set a school record with 14 touchdown receptions for the season. The Broncos intercepted Vandal quarterback Brian Reader 5 times and recovered 2 fumbles to record 7 turnovers. The Broncos would remain at #6 in all 4 major polls following the win.

Passing Leaders	Rushing Leaders	Receiving Leaders	Defensive Leaders
Kellen Moore: 22/32, 299 YDS, 5 TDS, LG of 35	Jeremy Avery: 14 CAR, 110 YDS, 1 TD, LG of 36	Autin Pettis: 8 REC, 123 YDS, 4 TDS, LG of 35	Kyle Wilson: 4 TOT TKLS, 1 INT for 71 YDS, 1 TD
	Doug Martin: 4 CAR, 26 YDS	Titus Young: 6 REC, 101 YDS, 1 TD, LG of 25	Brandyn Thompson: 5 TOT TKLS, 2 INTS

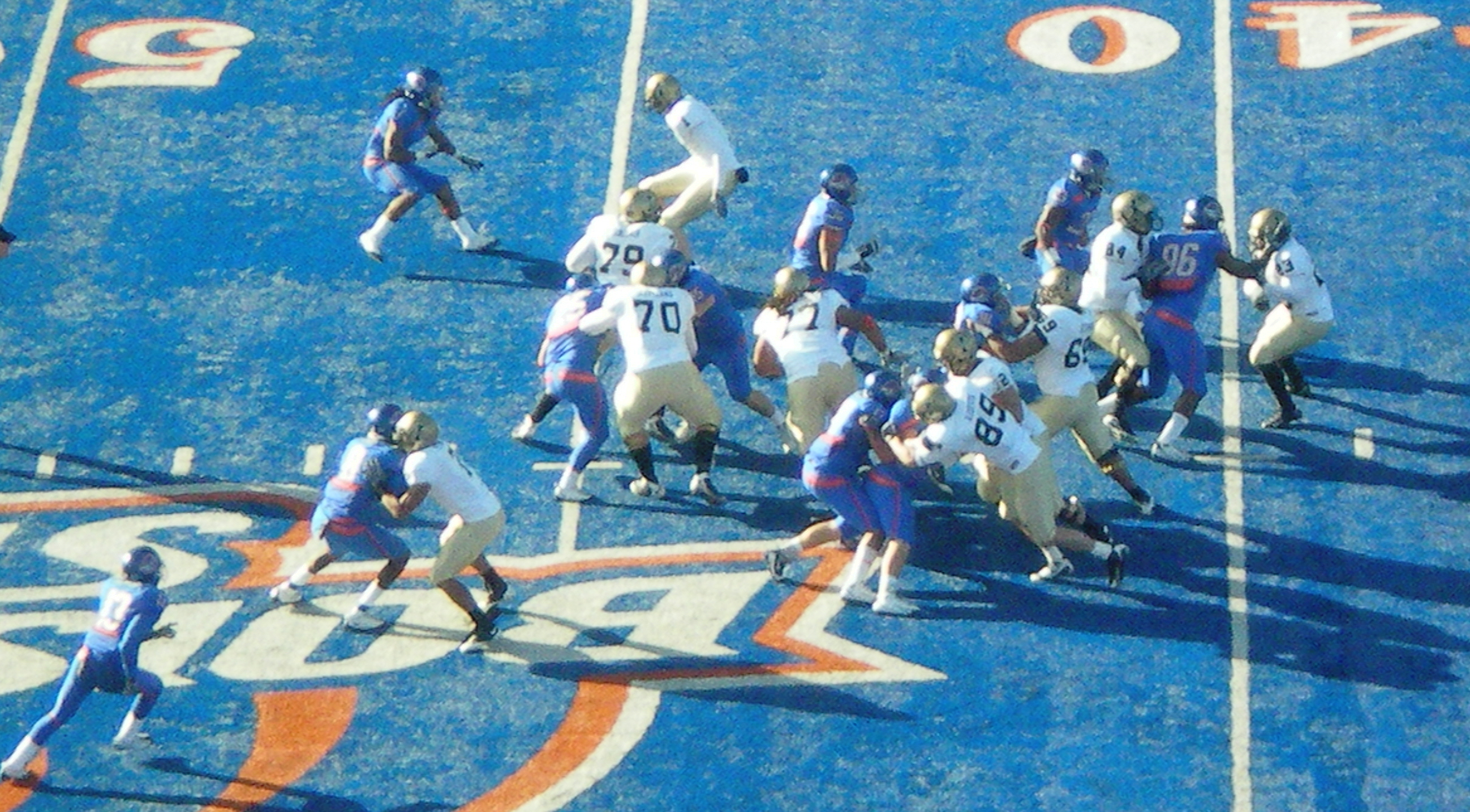
Boise State's defense forced 7 Vandal turnovers.

1st Quarter

- 12:11 BSU–Austin Pettis 4 Yd Pass From Kellen Moore (Austin Pettis Pass To Kyle Efaw For Two–Point Conversion) 0–8
- 10:46 BSU–Titus Young 25 Yd Pass From Kellen Moore (Two–Point Pass Conversion Failed) 0–14
- 06:28 IDHO–DeMaundray Woolridge 29 Yd Run (Trey Farquhar Kick) 7–14
- 04:35 BSU–Austin Pettis 8 Yd Pass From Kellen Moore (Kyle Brotzman Kick) 7–21

2nd Quarter

- 12:46 IDHO–Trey Farquhar 30 Yd FG 10–21
- 09:10 BSU–Jeremy Avery 1 Yd Run (Kyle Brotzman Kick) 10–28
- 05:23 BSU–Austin Pettis 20 Yd Pass From Kellen Moore (Kyle Brotzman Kick) 10–35
- 00:27 IDHO–DeMaundray Woolridge 1 Yd Run (Trey Farquhar Kick) 17–35
- 00:14 BSU–Titus Young 100 Yd Kickoff Return (Kyle Brotzman Kick) 17–42

3rd Quarter

- 10:20 BSU–Kyle Wilson 71 Yd Interception Return (Kyle Brotzman Kick) 17–49
- 07:12 BSU–Kyle Efaw 11 Yd Pass From Matt Kaiserman (Kyle Brotzman Kick) 17–56

4th Quarter

- 14:55 BSU–Austin Pettis 14 Yd Pass From Kellen Moore (Kyle Brotzman Kick) 17–63
- 00:27 IDHO–Princeton McCarty 52 Yd Pass From Brian Reader (Deonte' Jackson Run For Two-Point Conversion) 25–63

On November 16 Austin Pettis was named the WAC offensive player of the week and Titus Young was named WAC special teams player of the week. Senior fullback and offensive captain Richie Brockel, one of only five seniors on the roster, missed the remainder of the season with a foot injury. Freshman running back Matt Kaiserman, who had missed the first six games with a concussion, missed the remainder of the season with a broken leg.

=== Utah State ===
	1	2	3	4	Total
#6 Broncos	7	28	10	7	52
Aggies	7	7	7	0	21

16th meeting. 11–4 all time. Last meeting in 2008, a 49–14 Broncos win in Boise.

The Broncos opened the season 11–0 for the 4th time in 6 years and their 9th straight win over Utah State with a 52–21 win. The Aggies hung with the Broncos until about 6 minutes left in the first half with the score tied at 14 until the Broncos scored 3 quick TDs to end the half, one after a fumble recovery at the 9 yard line, to lead 35–14 at half. The Aggie pass defense held Kellen Moore to under 60% pass completions for the first time in his career (24 games) going 15/29 (51.7%) for 233 YDs and only 1 TD which ended a streak of 9 straight games with multiple TD passes and 6 straight with 3 or more. The Bronco run game picked up where the passing left off as they racked up a season high 323 YDs with both Doug Martin and Jeremy Avery going over 115 YDs with a combined 6 TDS, 4 for Martin alone. Austin Pettis failed to catch a TD for the first time in a game this season. Kyle Brotzman's 52 yard FG in the 3rd quarter was a career long. The Bronco defense dominated the Aggies forcing 13 TFL of 45 YDs, 4 Sacks and 2 turnovers. Boise State remained at #6 in every major poll for the 3rd straight week.

Passing Leaders	Rushing Leaders	Receiving Leaders	Defensive Leaders
Kellen Moore: 15/29, 233 YDS, 1 TD, LG of 52	Doug Martin: 13 CAR, 121 YDS, 4 TDS, LG of 33	Titus Young: 5 REC, 102 YDS, LG of 52	Team Defense: 13 TFL of 45 YDS, 4 SACKS, 1 INT, 1 FUMB REC
	Jeremy Avery: 16 CAR, 116 YDS, 2 TDS, LG of 32	Austin Pettis: 4 REC, 69 YDS, LG of 32	Jeron Johnson: 14 TOT TKLS

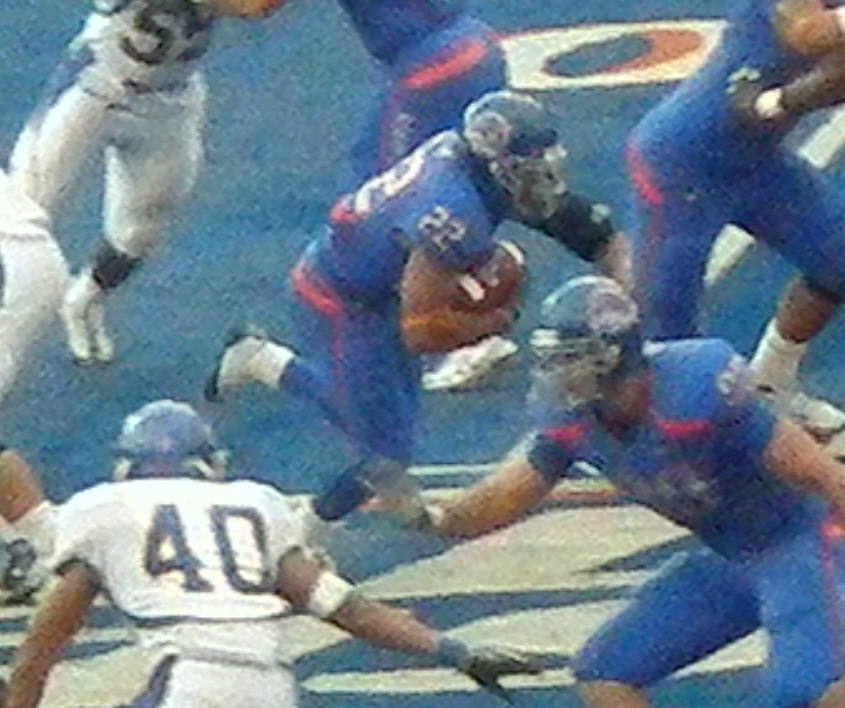
Doug Martin (22) was named WAC offensive player of the week.

1st Quarter

- 08:54 BSU–Tommy Gallarda 8 Yd Pass From Kellen Moore (Kyle Brotzman Kick) 7–0
- 05:52 USU–Michael Smith 22 Yd Run (Chris Ulinski Kick) 7–7

2nd Quarter

- 08:51 BSU–Doug Martin 17 Yd Run (Kyle Brotzman Kick) 14–7
- 06:28 USU–Robert Turbin 24 Yd Run (Chris Ulinski Kick) 14–14
- 04:47 BSU–Doug Martin 2 Yd Run (Kyle Brotzman Kick) 21–14
- 04:04 BSU–Jeremy Avery 9 Yd Run (Kyle Brotzman Kick) 28–14
- 00:05 BSU–Doug Martin 1 Yd Run (Kyle Brotzman Kick) 35–14

3rd Quarter

- 12:56 BSU–Jeremy Avery 32 Yd Run (Kyle Brotzman Kick) 42–14
- 05:49 USU–Michael Smith 12 Yd Run (Chris Ulinski Kick) 42–21
- 01:37 BSU–Kyle Brotzman 52 Yd FG 45–21

4th Quarter

- 09:49 BSU–Doug Martin 6 Yd Run (Kyle Brotzman Kick) 52–21

On November 23 Doug Martin was named WAC offensive player of the week, the 4th Bronco in the last 3 weeks to be awarded by the WAC, for his performance of 13 CAR for 121 YDs and 4 TDs.

=== Nevada ===
	1	2	3	4	Total
Wolf Pack	0	16	10	7	33
#6 Broncos	20	7	7	10	44

36th meeting. 23–12 all time. Last meeting in 2008, a 41–34 Broncos win in Reno.

On November 23, this game was named the Allstate Sugar Bowl Manning Award Matchup of the Week for the matchup of Boise State QB Kellen Moore vs Nevada QB Colin Kaepernick.

Nevada came into the game on an eight-game win streak and 7–0 in the WAC and looked to knock off the Broncos to win the outright WAC championship, but the undefeated Broncos set the tone early and often on their way to at least a share of their seventh WAC title in eight years. Titus Young took the game's opening kickoff 95 yards for a touchdown, his second return TD in three weeks, and the Broncos would add two TD passes to seldom-used fullback Dan Paul to lead 20–0 at the end of the first quarter. After a Wolf Pack field goal, Paul added his third touchdown reception to give the Broncos their largest lead of the game 27–3. Nevada would keep the game close by scoring two TDs before halftime to be down by 11 but could only match the Broncos point for point in the second half to lose 44–33. The Broncos held the nations leading rushing attack to only 242 yards and Kaepernick was held to only 172 total yards. Moore added five more TDs to bring his season total to 38, which set a new school record for TD passes in a season, passing the old record of 35. The Broncos stayed at #6 for the fourth straight week in every major poll and with Oklahoma's win over Oklahoma State, Boise State became the front runner to receive an at large bid to a BCS bowl game.

Passing Leaders	Rushing Leaders	Receiving Leaders	Defensive Leaders
Kellen Moore: 17/33, 262 YDS, 5 TDS, LG of 41	Doug Martin: 16 CAR, 128 YDS, LG of 18	Kirby Moore: 3 REC, 69 YDS, 1 TD, LG of 34	Hunter White: 8 TOT TKLS, 2 TFL of 7 YDS
	Jeremy Avery: 14 CAR, 37 YDS, LG of 9	Dan Paul: 3 REC, 22 YDS, 3 TDS, LG of 18	Aaron Tevis: 5 TOT TKLS, 1 SACK for 16 YDS

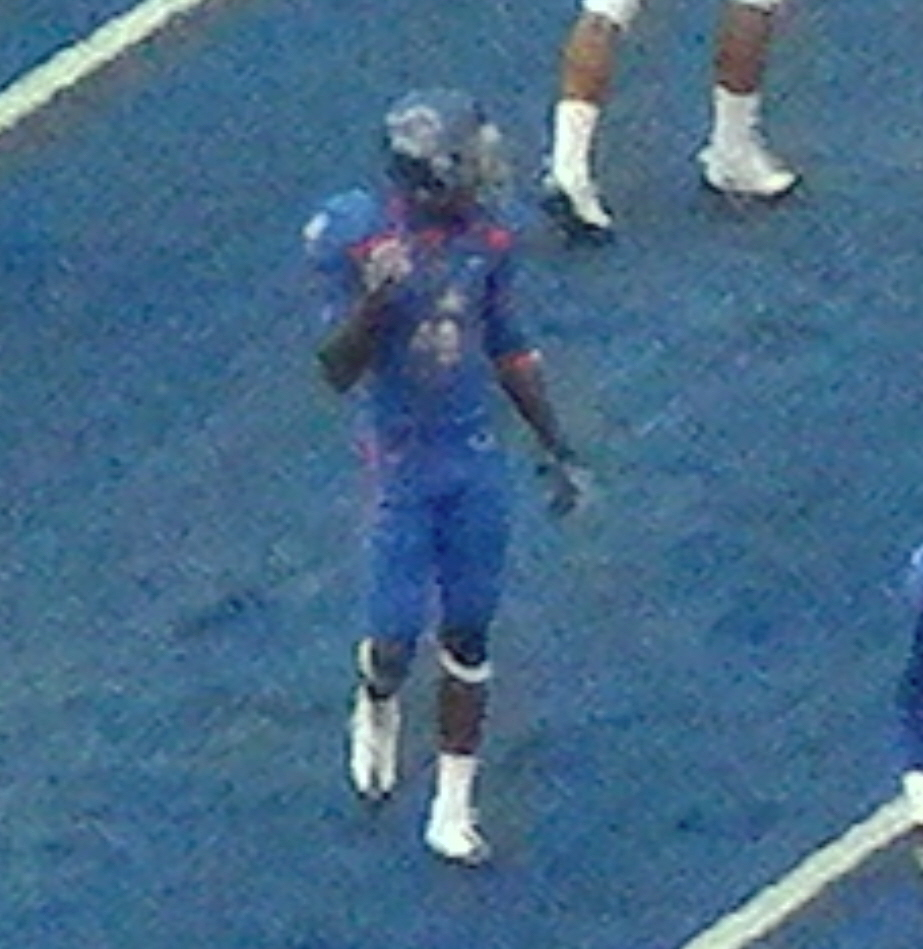
Titus Young was named WAC special teams player of the week for the 3rd time this season.

1st Quarter

- 14:45 BSU–Titus Young 95 Yd Kickoff Return (Kyle Brotzman Kick) 0–7
- 09:03 BSU–Dan Paul 18 Yd Pass From Kellen Moore (Two–Point Conversion Failed) 0–13
- 04:20 BSU–Dan Paul 3 Yd Pass From Kellen Moore (Kyle Brotzman Kick) 0–20

2nd Quarter

- 13:36 NEV–Richard Drake 26 Yd FG 3–20
- 09:59 BSU–Dan Paul 1 Yd Pass From Kellen Moore (Kyle Brotzman Kick) 3–27
- 03:38 NEV–Virgil Green 6 Yd Pass From Colin Kaepernick (Pat Failed) 9–27
- 00:03 NEV–Brandon Wimberly 3 Yd Pass From Colin Kaepernick (Richard Drake Kick) 16–27

3rd Quarter

- 09:38 NEV–Richard Drake 37 Yd FG 19–27
- 02:40 BSU–Tommy Gallarda 21 Yd Pass From Kellen Moore (Kyle Brotzman Kick) 19–34
- 02:23 NEV–Vai Taua 71 Yd Run (Richard Drake Kick) 26–34

4th Quarter

- 10:55 BSU–Kyle Brotzman 27 Yd FG 26–37
- 05:08 BSU–Kirby Moore 6 Yd Pass From Kellen Moore (Kyle Brotzman Kick) 26–44
- 01:16 NEV–Tray Session 23 Yd Pass From Colin Kaepernick (Richard Drake Kick) 33–44

On November 30, wide receiver Titus Young was named the WAC special teams player of the week, marking the third time he has won the award this season. Wide receiver Austin Pettis, who leads the team with 14 TD catches, broke his leg on the Broncos failed two point conversion after their second TD. He did return and played sparingly in the Broncos bowl game. Starting linebacker Daron Mackey tore his ACL and missed the remainder of the season.

=== New Mexico State ===
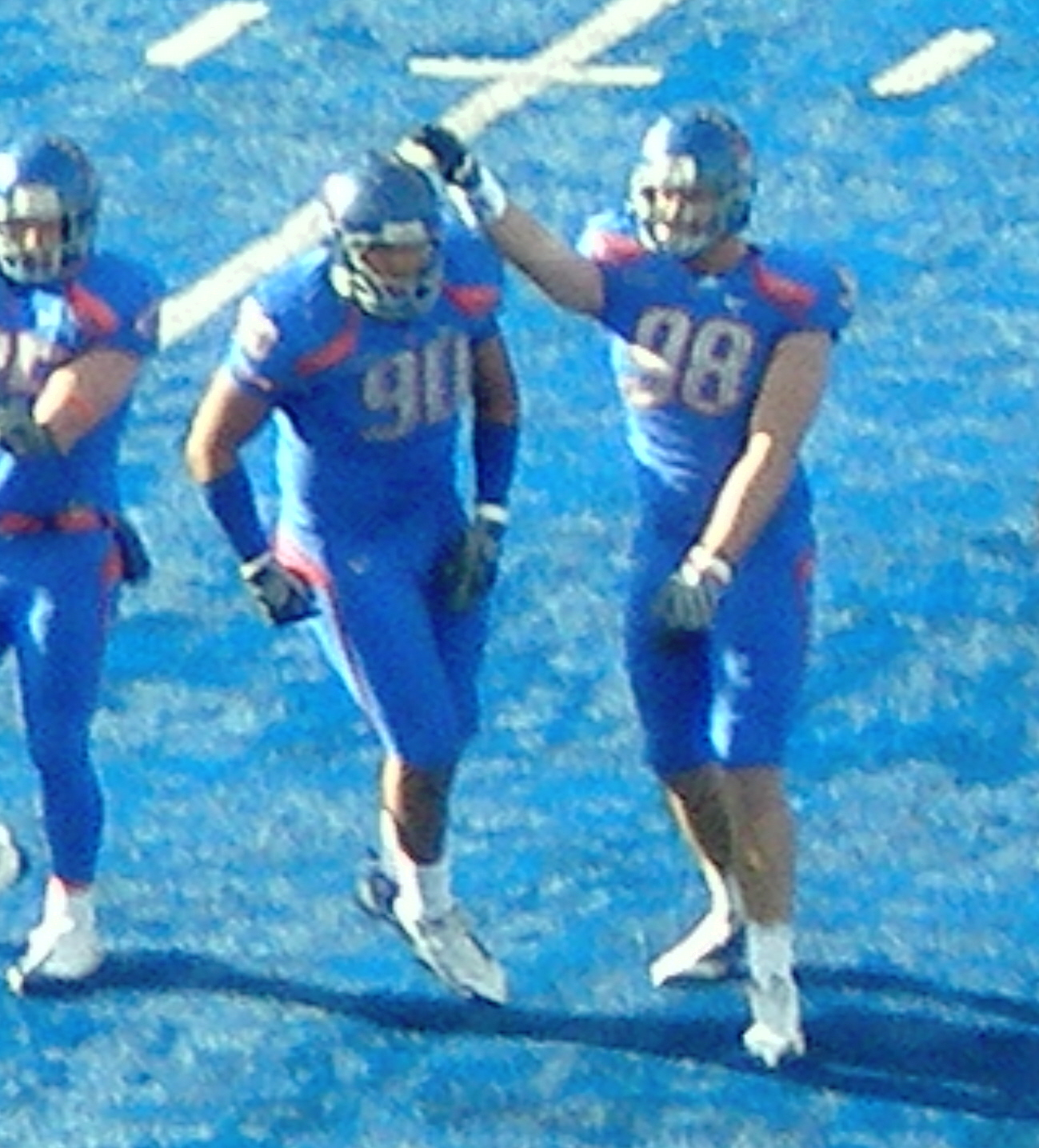
Billy Winn (90) and Ryan Winterswyk (98) after combining for a sack.

	1	2	3	4	Total
Aggies	0	0	0	7	7
#6 Broncos	7	21	14	0	42

10th meeting. 9–0 all time. Last meeting in 2008, a 49–0 Broncos win in Las Cruces.

Boise State wrapped un another undefeated season and outright WAC title with a 42–7 win over New Mexico State. The Broncos finished the regular season 13–0 for their second consecutive and fourth undefeated regular season in six years. The conference title is their seventh title in nine years as a WAC member and sixth outright title. The win was also the 56th straight game and eighth straight season of being undefeated at home in the regular season (2002–2009).The Broncos opened the scoring with a 47-yard TD pass from Moore to Young, bringing Moore's school record for TD passes in a season to 39. Jeremy Avery and Doug Martin would provide the rest of the scoring combining for 5 TDs (4 for Martin) and 170 yards with Martin breaking a TD run of 56 yards, his season long. Ryan Winterswyk had half a sack to finish the year with a team high 8.5. Brandyn Thompson's INT in the 2nd quarter brought the Bronco total to 21 for the year. Boise State finished the regular season ranked #6 in every major poll, their highest ranking to end a season in school history.

Passing Leaders	Rushing Leaders	Receiving Leaders	Defensive Leaders
Kellen Moore: 19/30, 272 YDS, 1 TD, LG of 47	Jeremy Avery: 16 CAR, 87 YDS, 1 TD, LG of 11	Titus Young: 7 REC, 92 YDS, 1 TD, LG of 74	J.C. Percy: 9 TOT TKLS, 0.5 TFL, 1 FR
	Doug Martin: 8 CAR, 83 YDS, 4 TDS, LG of 56	Kyle Efaw: 5 REC, 68 YDS, LG of 19	Ryan Winterswyk: 2 TOT TKLS, 1.5 TFL of 9 YDS, 0.5 SACK

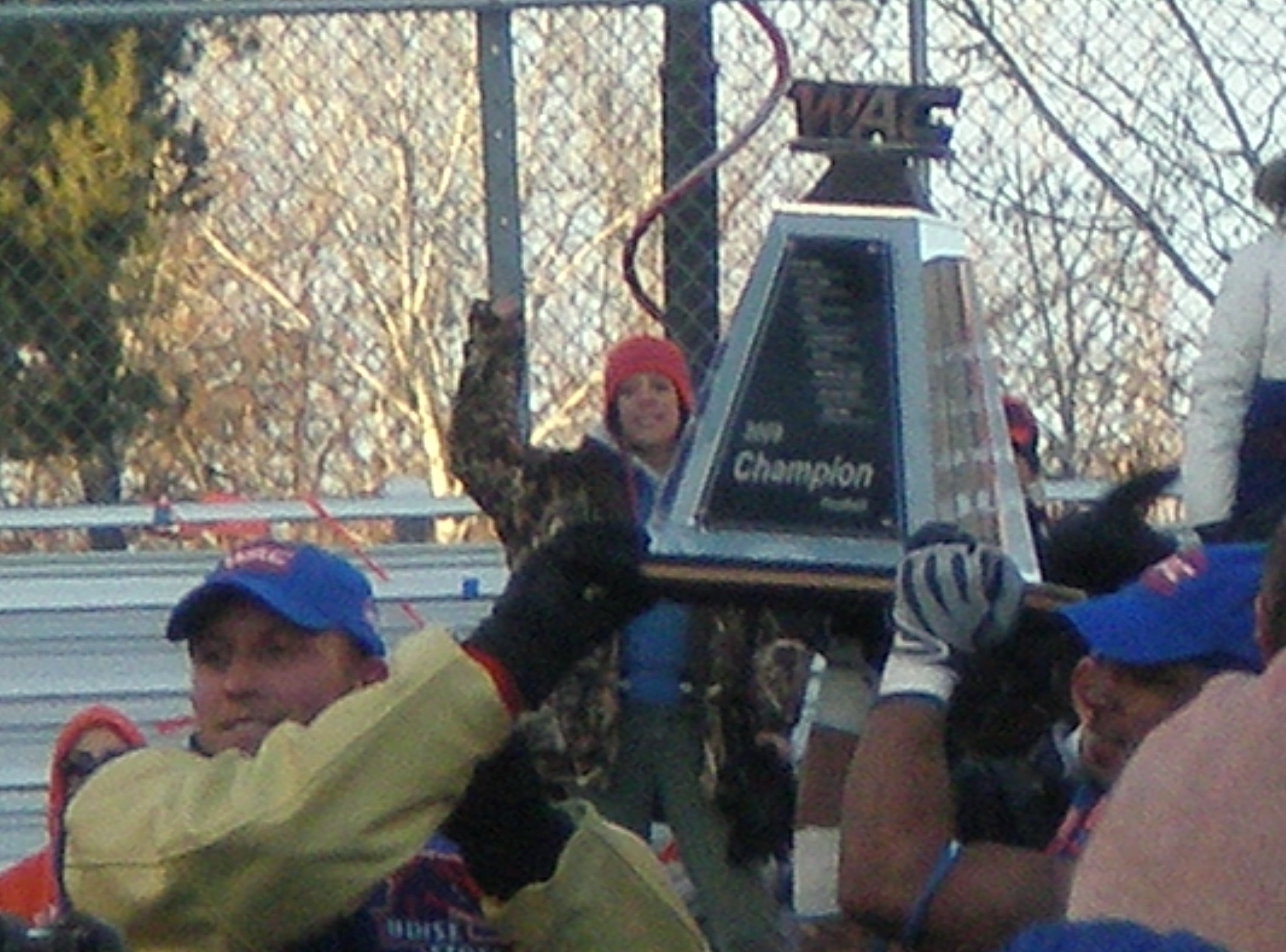
Captains Richie Brockel and Kyle Wilson with the WAC championship Trophy.

1st Quarter

- 03:56 BSU–Titus Young 47 Yd Pass From Kellen Moore (Kyle Brotzman Kick) 0–7

2nd Quarter

- 10:32 BSU–Jeremy Avery 9 Yd Run (Kyle Brotzman Kick) 0–14
- 07:02 BSU–Doug Martin 4 Yd Run (Kyle Brotzman Kick) 0–21
- 00:41 BSU–Doug Martin 4 Yd Run (Kyle Brotzman Kick) 0–28

3rd Quarter

- 07:41 BSU–Doug Martin 2 Yd Run (Kyle Brotzman Kick) 0–35
- 03:42 BSU–Doug Martin 56 Yd Run (Kyle Brotzman Kick) 0–42

4th Quarter

- 04:32 NMSU–Trevor Walls 1 Yd Run (Kyle Hughes Kick) 7–42

On December 6 the Broncos were selected to play 12–0 and BCS #4 TCU in the Tostitos Fiesta Bowl. This will be Boise State's second BCS appearance with the other being the 2007 Fiesta Bowl. TCU earned the non–automatic qualifiers automatic bid by being the highest ranked team from a non BCS conference. Boise State became the first team from a non BCS conference to earn an at large bid to a BCS bowl. The Fiesta Bowl will also be the first BCS bowl to feature two teams from non-automatic BCS qualifying conferences and the first to feature two undefeated teams outside of the National Championship game.

=== Fiesta Bowl - TCU ===
	1	2	3	4	Total
#6 Broncos	7	3	0	7	17
#4 Horned Frogs	0	7	3	0	10

3rd meeting. 1–1 all time. Last meeting in 2008, a 17–16 Horned Frogs win in the Poinsettia Bowl.

The Broncos reached into their bag of tricks once again on the biggest of stages to help pull out a 17–10 victory over TCU to avenge their only loss in the 2008 season and win their second Fiesta Bowl championship. In a game dominated by defense the Broncos would strike first with a Brandyn Thompson 51 yard interception return for a touchdown. Kyle Brotzman, who had earlier in the game missed a 36-yard field goal, connected on a 40-yard field goal to extend the lead to 10–0. TCU's Andy Dalton threw a 30-yard TD pass to Curtis Clay right before halftime to make the score 10–7 at the break. A third quarter 29 yard TCU field goal would tie the game. Both teams went back and forth into the fourth quarter until Boise State pulled off a gutsy call that opened the game up. On fourth and nine on their own 33 yard line the Broncos executed a fake punt for a first down with a 29-yard pass from Kyle Brotzman to Kyle Efaw. Three straight completions by Kellen Moore put the Broncos on the 2 yard line where Doug Martin dove into the endzone for a 17–10 lead. Brotzman came up clutch two more times as he made a touchdown saving tackle on a punt return with about five minutes to play and punted the ball to the one yard line with only 1:06 to play. The Horned Frogs would have had to go 99 yards to tie the game. TCU drove to the Broncos 30 yard line before Dalton was intercepted by Winston Venable to seal the win with 18 seconds to play. Brandyn Thompson was named the game's defensive MVP with 2 interceptions, 1 for a TD, and 7 tackles. Kyle Efaw was named the game's offensive MVP with 4 receptions for 75 yards and caught the pass on the fake punt. The 14 wins is the most in school history and only the second 14–0 season in NCAA history (2002 Ohio State, the winner of the 2010 BCS National Championship, Alabama, also was 14–0).

Passing Leaders	Rushing Leaders	Receiving Leaders	Defensive Leaders
Kellen Moore: 23/39, 211 YDS, LG of 30	Doug Martin: 16 CAR, 42 YDS, 1 TD, LG of 9	Titus Young: 8 REC, 72 YDS, 1 TD, LG of 74	Brandyn Thompson: 7 TOT TKLS, 2 INT for 51 YDS, 1 TD
	Jeremy Avery: 12 CAR, 20 YDS, LG of 7	Kyle Efaw: 4 REC, 75 YDS, LG of 29	Winston Venable: 8 TOT TKLS, 1 INT for 15 YDS

1st Quarter

- 11:28 BSU–Brandyn Thompson 51 Yd Interception Return (Kyle Brotzman Kick) 7–0

2nd Quarter

- 08:02 BSU–Kyle Brotzman 40 Yd FG 10–0
- 00:49 TCU–Curtis Clay 30 Yd Pass From Andy Dalton (Ross Evans Kick) 10–7

3rd Quarter

- 03:52 TCU–Ross Evans 29 Yd FG 10–10

4th Quarter

- 07:21 BSU–Doug Martin 2 Yd Run (Kyle Brotzman Kick) 17–10

On January 7, following the National Championship game, the Broncos would finish ranked #4 in the AP and coaches poll, their highest ranking in school history to finish a season (#5 AP and #6 coaches in 2006).

== Post-season awards ==
=== WAC Coach of the Year ===
Chris Petersen- 2nd straight year

=== WAC Offensive Player of the Year ===
Kellen Moore- So. QB

=== First Team All WAC ===
Kellen Moore- So. QB- 2008 2nd team

Austin Pettis- Jr. WR- 2008 2nd team

Titus Young- Jr. WR

Nate Potter- So. OL

Kyle Wilson-Sr. DB- 2nd straight year on the 1st team, 2007 2nd team

Ryan Winterswyk- Jr. DL- 2nd straight year on the 1st team

Titus Young- Jr. ST/KR

=== Second Team All WAC ===
Jeremy Avery- Jr. RB

Billy Winn- So. DL

Winston Venable-Jr. LB

Jeron Johnson- Jr. DB- 2008 2nd team

=== Paul "Bear" Bryant Award ===
Head Coach Chris Petersen

== Rankings ==
Ranking movements Legend: ██ Increase in ranking ██ Decrease in ranking ( ) = First-place votes
	Week															
Poll	Pre	1	2	3	4	5	6	7	8	9	10	11	12	13	14	Final
AP	14	12	10	8	5	6	5	6	6	5	6	6	6	6	6	4
Coaches	16	11	10	8	5	6	6	5	5	5	6	6	6	6	6	4
Harris	Not released				5	5	5	5	5	4 (1)	6	6	6	6	6	Not released
BCS	Not released							4	7	7	6	6	6	6	6	Not released

== Statistics ==
=== Team ===
	BSU	Opp
Scoring	591	240
Points per game	42.2	17.1
First downs	311	224
Rushing	2606	1685
Passing	3698	2518
Total offense	6304	4203
Avg per game	450.3	300.2
Penalties-Yards	87–782	87–701
Fumbles-Lost	22–11	18–11

	BSU	Opp	Neutral
Punts-Yards	57–2413	88–3461	
Avg per punt	42.3	39.3	
Time of possession/Game	30:34	29:23	
3rd down conversions	66–174/38%	59–192/31%	
4th down conversions	17–22/77%	13–26/50%	
Touchdowns scored	76	31	
Field goals-Attempts	19–26	7–12	
PAT-Attempts	66-68	27-29	
Attendance	229,472	167,978	73,227
Games/Avg per Game	7–32,782	6–27,996	1–73,227

==== Scores by quarter ====
	1	2	3	4	Total
Boise State	124	220	140	107	591
Opponents	35	64	78	63	240

=== Offense ===
==== Rushing ====
Name	GP	Att	Yards	Avg	TD	Long	Avg/G
J. Avery	14	209	1151	5.6	6	74	82.2
D. Martin	14	129	765	5.9	15	56	54.6
D.J. Harper	3	44	284	6.5	3	60	94.7
M. Kaiserman	4	33	150	4.5	1	16	37.5
T. Young	14	15	138	9.2	3	25	9.9
J. Hodge	8	21	102	4.9	1	34	12.8
D. Wright	3	5	55	11.0	0	42	18.3
M. Coughlin	8	4	22	5.5	0	21	2.8
J. Taylor	1	2	3	1.5	0	3	3.0
T. Shoemaker	12	1	3	3.0	0	3	0.2
M. Burroughs	13	3	–5	–1.7	0	1	–0.4
K. Moore	14	24	–5	–0.2	1	9	–0.4
A. Pettis	13	1	–11	–11.0	0	–11	–0.8
TEAM	11	17	–46	–2.7	0	0	–4.2
Broncos Total	14	508	2606	5.1	30	74	186.1
Opponents	14	440	1685	3.8	15	71	120.4

==== Passing ====
Name	GP	Cmp–Att	Pct	Yds	TD	INT	Lng	Avg/G	RAT
K. Moore	14	277–431	64.3	3536	39	3	67	252.6	161.7
M. Coughlin	8	12–19	63.2	50	0	0	9	6.2	85.3
K. Brotzman	14	2–2	100.0	57	0	0	29	4.1	339.4
A. Pettis	12	1–1	100.0	28	0	0	28	2.3	335.2
M. Burroughs	12	1–1	100.0	16	0	0	16	1.3	234.4
M. Kaiserman	4	1–1	100.0	11	1	0	11	2.8	522.4
M. Choate	9	0–1	0.0	0	0	0	0	0	0.00
TEAM	8	0–1	0.0	0	0	0	0	0	0.00
Broncos Total	14	294–458	64.2	3698	40	3	67	264.1	159.5
Opponents	14	241–439	54.9	2518	15	24	59	179.9	103.4

==== Receiving ====
Name	GP	Rec	Yds	Avg	TD	Long	Avg/G
T. Young	14	79	1041	13.2	10	54	74.4
A. Pettis	13	63	855	13.6	14	65	65.8
K. Efaw	14	31	444	14.3	1	40	31.7
J. Avery	14	23	257	11.2	1	67	18.4
T. Shoemaker	12	21	345	16.4	2	35	28.8
Ki. Moore	13	21	242	11.5	2	61	18.6
M. Burroughs	13	11	92	8.4	1	32	7.1
T. Gallarda	14	9	110	12.2	4	28	7.9
R. Brockel	9	8	75	9.4	2	23	8.3
D. Martin	14	8	68	8.5	0	23	4.9
C. Potter	12	8	60	7.5	0	18	5.0
D. Paul	12	4	40	10.0	3	18	3.3
M. Kaiserman	4	2	20	10.0	0	12	5.0
C. Koch	10	2	17	8.5	0	10	1.7
J. Hodge	8	2	–3	–1.5	0	0	–0.4
J. Robinson	12	1	28	28.0	0	28	2.3
D.J. Harper	3	1	7	7.0	0	7	2.3
Broncos Total	14	294	3698	12.6	40	67	264.1
Opponents	14	241	2518	10.4	15	59	179.9

=== Defense ===
Team	GP	Tackles				Sacks	Pass Defense		Interceptions				Fumbles		Blkd Kick	
Team	GP	Solo	Ast	Total	TFL-Yds	No-Yds	BrUp	QBH	No.-Yds	Avg	TD	Long	Rcv-Yds-TD	FF	Blkd Kick	SFT
Total	14	533	400	933	99-342	26-156	52	17	24-293	12.2	4	71	11-2-0	11	4	1

=== Special teams ===
Field Goals	Made-Att	Pct	01-19	20-29	30-39	40-49	50-60	LNG	BLKD	PAT
K. Brotzman	18-25	72%	1-1	8-9	6-9	2-5	1-1	52	0	63-64
J. Pavel	1-1	100%	0-0	1-1	0-0	0-0	0-0	24	0	3-4

Team	Punting								Kickoffs				
Team	No.	Yds	Avg	Long	TB	FC	I20	Blkd	No.	Yds	Avg	TB	OB
Total	57	2413	42.3	72	4	3	22	0	110	6742	61.3	7	2

Team	Punt returns					Kick returns				
Team	No.	Yds	Avg	TD	Long	No.	Yds	Avg	TD	Long
Total	35	381	10.9	0	59	44	1172	26.6	2	100+

==== Scoring ====
Name	TD	FG	PAT	2PT PAT	SAFETY	TOT PTS
K. Brotzman		18	63			117
T. Young	15					90
D. Martin	15					90
A. Pettis	14					84
J. Avery	7					42
T. Gallarda	4					24
D. Paul	3					18
D.J. Harper	3					18
R. Brockel	2			1		14
T. Shoemaker	2			1		14
K. Wilson	2					12
Ki. Moore	2					12
K. Efaw	1			2		10
M. Burroughs	1					6
J. Hodge	1					6
M. Kaiserman	1					6
K. Moore	1					6
J. Pavel		1	3			6
B. Thompson	1					6
W. Venable	1					6
M. Choate				1		2
B. Winn					1	2
Broncos Total	76	19	66	5	1	591
Opponents	31	7	27	2	1	240

== Records ==
Lowest percentage of passes intercepted, season (over 350 attempts): Kellen Moore, 0.70%

An NCAA FBS record as of the end of 2014

== Expanded WAC standings ==
Western Athletic Conference
	Conf		Overall				
Team - Bowl Game	W	L	W	L	PF	PA	STREAK
#6 Boise State - Fiesta Bowl	8	0	14	0	591	240	W 14
Nevada - Hawaii Bowl	7	1	8	5	497	371	L 2
Fresno State - New Mexico Bowl	6	2	8	5	440	369	L 1
Idaho - Humanitarian Bowl	4	4	8	5	425	468	W 1
Hawaii	3	5	6	7	296	384	L 1
Louisiana Tech	3	5	4	8	350	309	W 1
Utah State	3	5	4	8	349	408	W 1
New Mexico State	1	7	3	10	149	411	L 7
San Jose State	1	7	2	10	165	414	L 1

== Roster ==
Starters in Bold

No.	Name	Pos.	Ht.	Wt.	Cls.	Hometown (H.S./Prev. Exp.)
1	**Kyle Wilson** Captain	CB	5-10	186	Sr.	Piscataway, NJ (Piscataway HS)
2	**Austin Pettis**	WR	6-3	201	Jr.	Anaheim, CA (Lutheran HS)
3	Chris Potter	WR	5-9	161	Fr.	Westlake Village, CA (Oaks Christian High School)
4	**Titus Young**	WR	5-10	170	Jr.	Los Angeles, CA (University HS)
5	Jason Robinson	S	5-11	194	Jr.	Los Angeles, CA (University HS)
6	D.J. Harper	RB	5-9	198	Jr.	Cypress, TX (Cypress Creek HS)
7	Mike Coughlin	QB	6-5	212	Jr.	San Diego, CA (Mira Mesa HS)
8	**George Iloka**	S	6-3	207	So.	Houston, TX (Kempner HS)
9	Mike Tamburo	QB	5-11	183	Fr.	Suwanee, GA (North Gwinnett HS)
10	Jerrell Gavins	CB	5-9	171	TBD	Miami, FL (El Camino JC) (South Miami Senior HS)
11	**Kellen Moore**	QB	6-0	187	So.	Prosser, WA (Prosser HS)
13	**Brandyn Thompson**	CB	5-10	180	Jr.	Elk Grove, CA (Franklin HS)
14	Garcia Day	S	6-1	204	Sr.	Temecula, CA (Mt. San Antonio) (Temecula Valley HS)
15	Joe Southwick	QB	6-1	182	Fr.	Danville, CA (San Ramon Valley HS)
16	Cedric Febis	DB	6-3	197	So.	Amsterdam, Netherlands (Bishop Kelly HS in Boise, ID)
17	**Winston Venable**	S	5-11	223	Jr.	San Rafael, CA (Glendale Community College) (St. Thomas More Prep (Oakdale, CT))
18	Aaron Burks	WR	6-2	186	Fr.	Grand Prairie, TX (Mansfield Timberview HS)
19	Josh Borgman	CB	5-7	169	Fr.	Boise, ID (Centennial HS)
20	Mitch Burroughs	WR	5-9	188	Fr.	Meridian, ID (Meridian HS)
21	Jamar Taylor	DB	5-11	193	So.	San Diego, California (Helix High School)
22	**Doug Martin**	S/RB	5-9	201	So.	Stockton, CA (Saint Mary's HS)
23	**Jeron Johnson**	S	5-11	194	Jr.	Compton, CA (Dominguez HS)
24	Malcolm Johnson	RB	5-10	181	Fr.	Gresham, OR (Barlow HS)
25	Hunter White	LB	5-11	224	So.	Huntington Beach, CA (Edison HS)
26	Matt Kaiserman	RB	6-0	188	Fr.	Nampa, ID (Skyview HS)
27	**Jeremy Avery**	RB	5-9	179	Jr.	Bellflower, CA (Bellflower HS)
28	Jarvis Hodge	RB	5-9	203	Jr.	Phoenix, AZ (Mountain Point HS)
29	Tyler Jackson	S	6-0	203	Sr.	Castle Rock, Colorado (Douglas County High School)
30	Travis Stanaway	DB	5-11	188	So.	Clyde Hill, WA (Bellevue HS)
31	Antwon Murray	CB	5-11	177	So.	Lakeland, FL (Kathleen HS)
32	Andy Silsby	FB	5-11	221	Sr.	Boise, ID (Bishop Kelly HS)
33	Tommy Smith	LB	6-1	218	Fr.	Atlanta, GA (North Atlanta High School)
34	Kirby Moore	WR	6-2	196	Fr.	Prosser, WA (Prosser HS)
35	**Kyle Brotzman**	K/P	5-10	201	Jr.	Meridian, ID (Meridian HS)
36	**Aaron Tevis**	LB	6-3	228	So.	Tucson, AZ (Canyon Del Oro HS)
37	Ebenezer Makinde	CB	5-11	164	Fr.	Phoenix, AZ (Paradise Valley HS)
38	Raphiel Lambert	CB	5-11	200	Fr.	Portland, Oregon (Jesuit High School)
39	Drew Wright	FB	5-9	188	Fr.	Nampa, ID (Vallivue HS)
40	**Richie Brockel** Captain	FB/TE	6-2	240	Sr.	Phoenix, AZ (Greenway HS)
41	Kharyee Marshall	DE	6-1	207	Fr.	Phoenix, AZ (Washington HS)
42	Matt Wilson	LB	6-1	212	So.	Powell, WY (Powell HS)
43	Ricky Tjong-A-Tjoe	DT	6-3	282	Fr.	Netherlands, Amsterdam (Boise HS, in Boise, ID)
44	Allen Mooney	S	5-10	211	Fr.	Maple Valley, WA (O'Dea HS)
45	**Daron Mackey**	LB	5-11	233	Jr.	Bakersfield, CA (Bakersfield College) (West HS)
46	Michael Choate	WR	6-0	190	Sr.	Haviland, KS (Garden City CC) (Haviland HS)
47	Dan Paul	LB/FB	6-0	241	So.	Boring, OR (Sam Barlow HS)
48	J.C. Percy	LB	6-0	214	Fr.	Blackfoot, ID (Blackfoot HS)
49	Brad Elkin	P	6-2	201	Jr.	Tacoma, WA (Bellarmine Prep HS)
50	J.P. Nisby	DT	6-1	305	So.	Stockton, CA (Saint Mary's HS)
52	**Derrell Acrey**	LB	6-1	235	Jr.	East Highland, CA (Redlands East Valley HS)
53	Zach Gholson	DE	6-2	248	Fr.	Carlsbad, CA
54	**Michael Ames**	OL	6-4	281	Fr.	Boise, ID (Centennial HS)
56	John Michael Davis	LB	6-0	210	Fr.	Santa Margarita, CA (Las Flores HS)
57	Garrett Pendergast	OL	6-4	271	So.	Whittier, CA (Servite HS)
58	Dave Wilson	LB	6-1	222	So.	Powell, WY (Powell HS)
59	**Will Lawrence**	OL	6-2	293	Jr.	Upper Marlboro, MD (CH Flowers HS)
61	Joe Kellogg	OL	6-2	305	Fr.	Scottsdale, AZ (Saguaro HS)
62	**Kevin Sapien**	OL	6-4	286	Jr.	Torrance, CA (West Torrance HS)
64	Brenel Myers	OL	6-2	267	Fr.	Houston, TX (Westfield HS)
65	Matt Paradis	DT	6-1	275	Fr.	Council, ID (Council HS)
66	**Thomas Byrd**	C	5-11	284	So.	San Pablo, CA (McClymond HS)
70	Zach Waller	OL	6-5	289	So.	Elk Grove, CA (Franklin HS)
71	Cory Yriarte	OL	6-1	281	So.	Palmdale, CA (Oaks Christian HS)
72	**Matt Slater**	OT	6-4	290	Jr.	St. Paul, MN (Cretin Derham Hall HS)
73	Nate Potter	OL	6-6	293	So.	Boise, ID (Timberline HS)
74	Tom Swanson	OL	6-6	273	Fr.	Sammamish, Washington (Skyline High School)
75	Faraji Wright	OT	6-3	284	Fr.	Vallejo, CA (Berkeley HS)
76	Jake Broyles	OL	6-4	257	Fr.	Henderson, NV (Foothill HS)
77	Spencer Gerke	OL	6-3	290	Fr.	Boise, ID (Bishop Kelly)
78	Charles Leno	OT	6-3	249	Fr.	Oakland, CA (San Leandro HS)
79	Bronson Durrant	OL	6-3	266	Fr.	Eugene, OR (Marist)
80	Kyle Efaw	TE	6-4	229	So.	Boise, ID (Capital HS)
81	Nick Alexander	DE	6-4	237	Fr.	Los Angeles, CA (Crenshaw HS)
82	Geraldo Hiwat	WR	6-4	189	Fr.	Netherlands, Amsterdam (Capital HS in Boise, ID)
83	Sean King	TE	6-3	240	Jr.	Boise, ID (College of the Redwoods) (Timberline HS)
84	Jimmy Pavel	K	5-9	212	Fr.	Molalla, OR (Central Catholic HS)
85	**Tommy Gallarda**	TE	6-5	249	Jr.	Brea, CA (Brea Olinda HS)
86	Trevor Peterson	TE	6-2	245	Fr.	Camino, CA (El Dorado HS)
87	Gabe Linehan	TE	6-3	213	Fr.	Banks, OR (Banks, OR)
88	Chandler Koch	TE	6-2	244	Fr.	Flower Mound, TX (Flower Mound HS)
89	Tyler Shoemaker	WR	6-1	207	So.	Meridian, ID (Mountain View HS)
90	**Billy Winn**	DT	6-4	288	So.	Las Vegas, NV (Las Vegas HS)
91	Greg Grimes	DT	6-0	271	Fr.	Sacramento, CA (Inderkum HS)
91	Chuck Hayes	DT	6-2	290	So.	Auroro, CO (Eaglecrest HS)
92	Shea McClellin	DE	6-3	262	So.	Caldwell, ID (Marsing HS)
93	Justin Jungblut	DT	6-4	241	Fr.	Scottsdale, AZ (Saguaro HS)
94	Byron Hout	DE	6-0	241	So.	Coeur d' Alene, ID (Lake City HS)
95	Darren Koontz	DE	6-3	254	Fr.	Los Alamitos, CA (Los Alamitos High School)
96	**Jarrell Root**	DE	6-3	259	So.	Boise, ID (Capital HS)
97	**Chase Baker**	DT	6-1	296	So.	Rocklin, CA (Rocklin HS)
98	**Ryan Winterswyk**	DE	6-4	263	Jr.	La Habra, CA (La Habra HS)
99	Michael Atkinson	DT	6-0	332	Fr.	Windsor, Ontario, Canada (Catholic Central High School)

== Coaching staff ==
Name	Position	Years at BSU
Chris Petersen	Head Coach	9
Brent Pease	Assistant head coach Wide receivers	4
Bryan Harsin	Offensive coordinator Quarterbacks	9
Scott Huff	Offensive lines	4
Marcel Yates	Secondary	4
Chris Strausser	Tight ends Run Game Coordinator	8
Justin Wilcox	Defensive coordinator	4
Jeff Choate	Special teams Linebackers	4
Pete Kwiatkowski	Defensive line	12
Keith Bhonapha	Running backs	1

== NFL draft ==
On April 22, 2010, Sr. Cornerback Kyle Wilson was selected as the 29th overall pick in the first round of the 2010 NFL draft by the New York Jets. Wilson is just the second Bronco ever taken in the first round of the draft (Ryan Clady 12th overall in 2008). Wilson grew up in Piscataway, New Jersey, which is only about 30 miles from where the Jets play their home games.
