= 1979–80 Big East Conference men's basketball season =

American college basketball season

1979–80 Big East Conference Men's Basketball Season
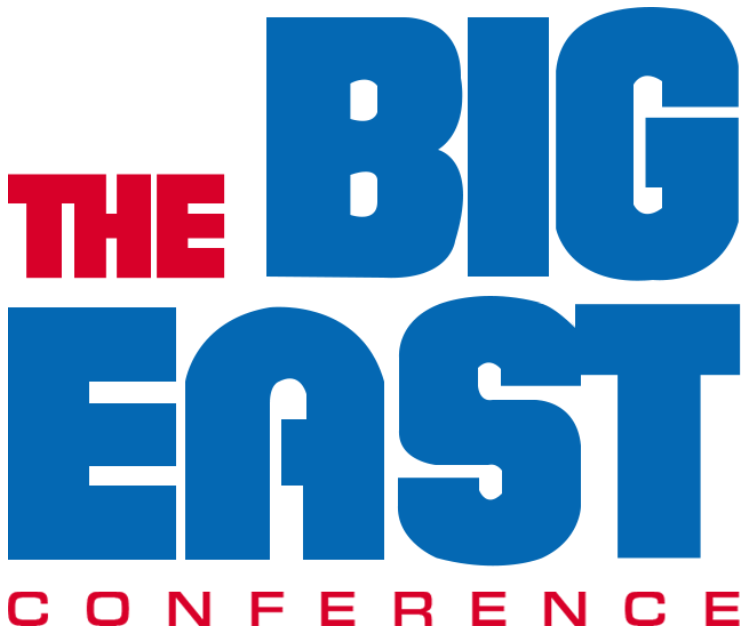
- League: NCAA Division I
- Sport: Basketball
- Duration: December 1, 1979 through March 1, 1980
- Teams: 7
- TV partner: ESPN

Regular Season
- Champion: Syracuse, St. John's, and Georgetown (5–1)
- Season MVP: John Duren – Georgetown

Tournament
- Champions: Georgetown
- Finals MVP: Craig Shelton – Georgetown

Basketball seasons
- 1980–81

1979–80 Big East men's basketball standings
	Conf.				Overall
Team	W		L	PCT	W		L	PCT
No. 6 Syracuse	5	–	1	.833	26	–	4	.867
No. 13 St. John's	5	–	1	.833	24	–	5	.828
No. 11 Georgetown†	5	–	1	.833	26	–	6	.813
Connecticut	3	–	3	.500	20	–	9	.690
Boston College	2	–	4	.333	19	–	10	.655
Seton Hall	1	–	5	.167	14	–	13	.519
Providence	0	–	6	.000	11	–	16	.407
† 1980 Big East tournament winner Rankings from AP poll

The 1979–80 Big East Conference men's basketball season was the first in conference history, and involved its seven full-time member schools.

Syracuse, St. John's, and Georgetown tied for first place in the regular season with identical 5–1 records. Georgetown was the champion of the first Big East tournament.

== Season summary & highlights ==
- A basketball-centered conference, the Big East developed a close working relationship with ESPN, which had launched on September 7, 1979, as the first all-sports television network and began televising college basketball in November 1979. Thanks to its quality of play and partnership with ESPN at a time when college basketball's popularity was growing rapidly, the Big East quickly developed a reputation as a powerhouse of college basketball and a dominating force in the sport.
- Each Big East member school played a six-game regular-season conference schedule, meeting each other member school once.
- Syracuse, St. John's, and Georgetown finished tied for first place during the regular season with identical records of 5–1.
- Georgetown won the tournament championship.
- Syracuse and St. John's spent the entire season ranked in the AP Top 20, with Syracuse reaching No. 2. Georgetown also made the Top 20 for part of the season.
- Georgetown's propensity for playing in tight games decided in the final seconds earned the 1979–80 team the nickname "the Heart Attack Hoyas."
- At Syracuse, the season was the last for the "Bouie and Louis Show," the combination of center Roosevelt Bouie and forward Louis Orr.
- On January 13, No. 5 Syracuse fell 10 points behind in a game at No. 9 Purdue, but outscored the Boilermakers 10–2 in the final two minutes to rally to a 66–61 victory and remain undefeated.
- On February 13 Georgetown upset No. 3 Syracuse on Syracuse's last game at Manley Field House, breaking a 57-game Syracuse winning streak at Manley and prompting Georgetown coach John Thompson Jr. to exult "Manley Field House is officially closed" during his post-game press conference. The upset and Thompson's quote are credited as the beginning of a Georgetown-Syracuse rivalry that was a defining feature of the original Big East Conference for the rest of its 34-year existence.
- The Big East tournament took place at the Providence Civic Center in Providence, Rhode Island.

== Head coaches ==
School	Coach	Season	Notes
Boston College	Tom Davis	3rd	
Connecticut	Dom Perno	3rd	
Georgetown	John Thompson, Jr.	8th	Big East Coach of the Year
Providence	Gary Walters	1st	
St. John's	Lou Carnesecca	12th	
Seton Hall	Bill Raftery	10th	
Syracuse	Jim Boeheim	4th	

== Rankings ==
Syracuse and St. John's were ranked in the Top 20 of the Associated Press poll throughout the season, with Syracuse reaching No. 2. Georgetown also reached the Top 20.

1979–80 Big East Conference Weekly Rankings Key: ██ Increase in ranking. ██ Decrease in ranking.
AP Poll	Pre	12/3	12/10	12/17	12/26	1/2	1/7	1/14	1/21	1/28	2/4	2/11	2/18	2/25	Final
Boston College															
Connecticut															
Georgetown	19	17	16	17	17	18	20							20	11
Providence															
St. John's	16	9	15	15	15	17	14	10	9	9	8	7	7	8	13
Seton Hall															
Syracuse	12	11	10	10	9	9	5	3	6	4	2	2	4	3	6

== Regular-season statistical leaders ==
Scoring
Name	School	PPG
Dan Callandrillo	SHU	19.4
Sleepy Floyd	GU	18.7
Daryl Devero	SHU	17.4
Craig Shelton	GU	17.3
Mike McKay	Conn	16.7

Rebounding
Name	School	RPG
Corny Thompson	Conn	9.3
Louis Orr	Syr	8.5
Roosevelt Bouie	Syr	8.1
Rudy Williams	Prov	7.6
Wayne McKoy	SJU	7.1

Assists
Name	School	APG
John Duren	GU	7.1
Eddie Moss	Syr	5.8
Ricky Tucker	Prov	5.2
Bernard Rencher	SJU	4.9
Jim Sweeney	BC	4.6

Steals
Name	School	SPG
Dan Callandrillo	SHU	3.0
Bobby Dulin	Conn	2.9
Eddie Moss	Syr	2.5
Bernard Rencher	SJU	2.4
Sleepy Floyd	GU	2.3

Blocks
Name	School	BPG
Rich Hunger	Prov	1.9
Burnett Adams	BC	1.8
Wayne McKoy	SJU	1.7
Joe Beaulieu	BC	0.8
David Russell	SJU	0.8

Field Goals
Name	School	FG%
Roosevelt Bouie	Syr	.654
Craig Shelton	GU	.609
Louis Orr	Syr	.569
Marty Headd	Syr	.564
Sleepy Floyd	GU	.554

Free Throws
Name	School	FT%
Jim Sweeney	BC	.851
Louis Orr	Syr	.849
Reggie Carter	SJU	.808
Corny Thompson	Conn	.794
Craig Shelton	GU	.783

== Postseason ==
=== Big East tournament ===
==== Seeding ====
The team which finished in first place during the regular season after the application of tiebreakers was seeded No. 1 in the Big East tournament and received a bye into the seminfinals, while the other six teams were seeded according to their finish in the regular season (with tiebreakers applied as necessary), and played a quarterfinal round. However, the regular season finished with a three-way tie for first place between Syracuse, St. John's, and Georgetown and with each of them posting a head-to-head record of 1–1 against one another. The conference broke the tie with a coin flip, which Syracuse won for the No. 1 seed. St. John's then received the No. 2 seed and Georgetown No. 3 based on their head-to-head record.

With that resolved, the tournament's seeding was as follows: (1) Syracuse, (2) St. John's, (3) Georgetown, (4) Connecticut, (5) Boston College, (6) Seton Hall, (7) Providence

==== Bracket ====
Quarterfinals
4	Connecticut	79
5	Boston College	68
2	#8 St. John's	48
7	Providence	44
3	#20 Georgetown	60
6	Seton Hall	47

Semifinals
1	#3 Syracuse	92
4	Connecticut	61
2	#8 St. John's	66
3	#20 Georgetown	76

Championship Game
1	#3 Syracuse	81
3	#20 Georgetown	87

=== NCAA tournament ===
The Big East sent three of its seven teams to the NCAA Tournament, with Syracuse securing a No. 1 seed in the East Region. St. John's lost in the Mideast Region quarterfinals, Syracuse in the East Region semifinals, and Georgetown in the East Region final.

School	Region	Seed	Round 1	Round 2	Sweet 16	Elite 8
Georgetown	East	3	Bye	6 Iona, W 74–71	2 Maryland, W 74–68	5 Iowa, L 81–80
Syracuse	East	1	Bye	8 Villanova, W 97–83	5 Iowa, L 88–77	
St. John's	Mideast	3	Bye	6 Purdue, L 87–72		

=== National Invitation Tournament ===
Boston College and Connecticut received bids to the National Invitation Tournament, which did not yet have seeding. Playing in two different unnamed brackets, Connecticut lost in the first round and Boston College in the second round.

School	Round 1	Round 2
Boston College	Boston University, W 95–74	Virginia, L 57–77
Connecticut	Saint Peter's, L 71–56	

== Awards and honors ==
=== Big East Conference ===
Player of the Year:

- John Duren, Georgetown, G, Sr.

Freshman of the Year:

- David Russell, St. John's, F

Coach of the Year:

- John Thompson, Jr., Georgetown (8th season)

All-Big East First Team:

- John Duren, Georgetown, G, Sr., 6 ft 3 in (191 cm), 150 lb (68 kg), Washington, D.C.
- Craig Shelton, Georgetown, F, Sr., 6 ft 7 in (201 cm), 210 lb (95 kg), Washington, D.C.
- Reggie Carter, St. John's, G, Sr., 6 ft 3 in (191 cm), 175 lb (79 kg) New York, N.Y.
- Louis Orr, Syracuse, F, Sr., 6 ft 8 in (203 cm), 175 lb (79 kg), Cincinnati, Ohio
- Roosevelt Bouie, Syracuse, C, Sr., 6 ft 6 in (198 cm), 215 lb (98 kg), Kendall, N.Y.

All-Big East Second Team:

- Corny Thompson, Connecticut, F, So., 6 ft 8 in (203 cm), 225 lb (102 kg), Middletown, Conn.
- Sleepy Floyd, Georgetown, G, So., 6 ft 3 in (191 cm), 172 lb (78 kg), Gastonia, N.C.
- Dan Callandrillo, Seton Hall, G, So., 6 ft 2 in (188 cm), 185 lb (84 kg), North Bergen, N.J.
- David Russell, St. John's, F, Fr., 6 ft 7 in (201 cm), 215 lb (98 kg), New York, N.Y.
- Wayne McKoy, St. John's, C, Jr., 6 ft 9 in (206 cm), 235 lb (107 kg), Elizabethtown, N.C.

All-Big East Third Team:

- Joe Beaulieu, Boston College, C, Jr., 6 ft 8 in (203 cm), Boston, Mass.
- Mike McKay, Connecticut, G, So., 6 ft 5 in (196 cm), 190 lb (86 kg), Bridgeport, Conn.
- Rudy Williams, Providence, G, So., 6 ft 7 in (201 cm), 195 lb (88 kg), Cambridge, Mass.
- Eddie Moss, Syracuse, G, Jr., 6 ft 2 in (188 cm), 180 lb (82 kg), Rosedale, N.Y.
- Marty Headd, Syracuse, G, Jr., 6 ft 2 in (188 cm), 180 lb (82 kg), Syracuse, N.Y.

Big East All-Freshman Team:

- John Bagley, Boston College, G, 6 ft 0 in (183 cm), 185 lb (84 kg), Bridgeport, Conn.
- Bruce Kuczenski, Connecticut, F, 6 ft 10 in (208 cm), 230 lb (104 kg), Bristol, Conn.
- Ricky Tucker, Providence, G, 6–10, 240, Philadelphia, Pa.
- David Russell, St. John's, F, 6 ft 7 in (201 cm), 215 lb (98 kg), New York, N.Y.
- Erich Santifer, Syracuse, G, 6 ft 5 in (196 cm), 180 lb (82 kg), Ann Arbor, Mich.

=== All-Americans ===
The following players were selected to the 1980 Associated Press All-America teams.

Second Team All-America:

- Reggie Carter, St. John's, Key Stats: 15.0 ppg, 4.7 rpg, 3.3 apg, 50.6 FG%, 404 points

AP Honorable Mention

- Roosevelt Bouie, Syracuse
- John Duren, Georgetown
- Louis Orr, Syracuse
- Craig Shelton, Georgetown
- Corny Thompson, Connecticut

== See also ==
- 1979–80 NCAA Division I men's basketball season
- 1979–80 Connecticut Huskies men's basketball team
- 1979–80 Georgetown Hoyas men's basketball team
- 1979–80 St. John's Redmen basketball team
- 1979–80 Syracuse Orangemen basketball team
