= Georgetown Hoyas men's basketball statistical leaders =

The Georgetown Hoyas men's basketball statistical leaders are individual statistical leaders of the Georgetown Hoyas men's basketball program in various categories, including points, rebounds, assists, steals, and blocks. Within those areas, the lists identify single-game, single-season, and career leaders. The Hoyas represent Georgetown University in the NCAA's Big East Conference.

Georgetown began competing in intercollegiate basketball in 1906. However, the school's record book does not generally list records from before the 1950s, as records from before this period are often incomplete and inconsistent. Since scoring was much lower in this era, and teams played much fewer games during a typical season, it is likely that few or no players from this era would appear on these lists anyway.

The NCAA did not officially record assists as a stat until the 1983–84 season, and blocks and steals until the 1985–86 season, but Georgetown's record books includes players in these stats before these seasons. These lists are updated through the end of the 2020–21 season.

== Scoring ==
Career
Rank	Player	Points	Seasons
1	Eric Floyd	2,304	1978–79 1979–80 1980–81 1981–82
2	Patrick Ewing	2,184	1981–82 1982–83 1983–84 1984–85
3	Reggie Williams	2,117	1983–84 1984–85 1985–86 1986–87
4	Alonzo Mourning	2,001	1988–89 1989–90 1990–91 1991–92
5	D'Vauntes Smith-Rivera	1,919	2012–13 2013–14 2014–15 2015–16
6	Othella Harrington	1,839	1992–93 1993–94 1994–95 1995–96
7	David Wingate	1,781	1982–83 1983–84 1984–85 1985–86
8	Austin Freeman	1,761	2007–08 2008–09 2009–10 2010–11
9	Mike Sweetney	1,750	2000–01 2001–02 2002–03
10	Kevin Braswell	1,735	1998–99 1999–00 2000–01 2001–02

Season
Rank	Player	Points	Season
1	Allen Iverson	926	1995–96
2	Reggie Williams	802	1986–87
3	Mike Sweetney	776	2002–03
4	Victor Page	682	1996–97
5	Alonzo Mourning	681	1991–92
6	Eric Floyd	619	1981–82
7	Charles Smith	617	1988–89
8	Mark Tillmon	615	1989–90
9	Allen Iverson	613	1994–95
10	Patrick Ewing	608	1983–84

Single game
Rank	Player	Points	Season	Opponent
1	Jim Barry	46	1964–65	Fairleigh Dickinson

== Rebounds ==
Career
Rank	Player	Rebounds	Seasons
1	Patrick Ewing	1,316	1981–82 1982–83 1983–84 1984–85
2	Merlin Wilson	1,230	1972–73 1973–74 1974–75 1975–76
3	Alonzo Mourning	1,032	1988–89 1989–90 1990–91 1991–92
4	Othella Harrington	983	1992–93 1993–94 1994–95 1995–96
5	Mike Sweetney	887	2000–01 2001–02 2002–03
6	Reggie Williams	886	1983–84 1984–85 1985–86 1986–87
7	Jessie Govan	842	2015–16 2016–17 2017–18 2018–19
8	Dikembe Mutombo	823	1988–89 1989–90 1990–91
9	Roy Hibbert	808	2004–05 2005–06 2006–07 2007–08
10	Mike Laughna	777	1969–70 1970–71 1971–72

Season
Rank	Player	Rebounds	Season
1	Dikembe Mutombo	389	1990–91
2	Patrick Ewing	371	1983–84
3	Merlin Wilson	366	1972–73
4	Mike Sweetney	352	2002–03
5	Merlin Wilson	351	1973–74
6	Alonzo Mourning	343	1991–92
7	Patrick Ewing	341	1984–85
8	Greg Monroe	328	2009–10
9	Dikembe Mutombo	325	1989–90
	Patrick Ewing	325	1982–83
	Joe Missett	325	1955–56

Single game
Rank	Player	Rebounds	Season	Opponent
1	Charlie Adrion	29	1967–68	George Washington

== Assists ==
Career
Rank	Player	Assists	Seasons
1	Kevin Braswell	695	1998–99 1999–00 2000–01 2001–02
2	Joey Brown	677	1990–91 1991–92 1992–93 1993–94
3	Michael Jackson	671	1982–83 1983–84 1984–85 1985–86
4	John Duren	583	1976–77 1977–78 1978–79 1979–80
5	Dwayne Bryant	527	1986–87 1987–88 1988–89 1989–90
6	Chris Wright	442	2007–08 2008–09 2009–10 2010–11
7	Jim Brown	408	1963–64 1964–65 1965–66
8	Fred Brown	390	1980–81 1981–82 1982–83 1983–84
9	D'Vauntes Smith-Rivera	386	2012–13 2013–14 2014–15 2015–16
10	Jonathan Wallace	378	2004–05 2005–06 2006–07 2007–08

Season
Rank	Player	Assists	Season
1	Michael Jackson	242	1984–85
2	John Duren	238	1979–80
3	Kevin Braswell	202	2000–01
4	Michael Jackson	200	1985–86
5	Joey Brown	199	1992–93
6	Joey Brown	195	1993–94
7	Kevin Braswell	179	1999–00
8	Dwayne Bryant	177	1989–90
	Jim Brown	177	1965–66
10	James Akinjo	173	2018–19
	Kevin Braswell	173	2001–02
	Allen Iverson	173	1995–96

Single game
Rank	Player	Assists	Season	Opponent
1	Charles Smith	16	1988–89	Saint Leo
	Kevin Braswell	16	2001–02	Rutgers

== Steals ==
Career
Rank	Player	Steals	Seasons
1	Kevin Braswell	349	1998–99 1999–00 2000–01 2001–02
2	Eric Floyd	253	1978–79 1979–80 1980–81 1981–82
3	Joey Brown	236	1990–91 1991–92 1992–93 1993–94
4	Allen Iverson	213	1994–95 1995–96
5	David Wingate	209	1982–83 1983–84 1984–85 1985–86
6	Reggie Williams	206	1983–84 1984–85 1985–86 1986–87
7	Fred Brown	199	1980–81 1981–82 1982–83 1983–84
8	Gene Smith	191	1980–81 1981–82 1982–83 1983–84
9	Dwayne Bryant	187	1986–87 1987–88 1988–89 1989–90
10	John Duren	184	1976–77 1977–78 1978–79 1979–80

Season
Rank	Player	Steals	Season
1	Allen Iverson	124	1995–96
2	Kevin Braswell	94	2000–01
3	Kevin Braswell	90	1999–00
4	Allen Iverson	89	1994–95
5	Kevin Braswell	84	1998–99
6	Kevin Braswell	81	2001–02
7	Joey Brown	80	1992–93
	Fred Brown	80	1981–82
9	Eric Smith	75	1981–82
10	Micah Peavy	74	2024–25

Single game
Rank	Player	Steals	Season	Opponent
1	Allen Iverson	10	1995–96	Miami

== Blocks ==
Career
Rank	Player	Blocks	Seasons
1	Patrick Ewing	493	1981–82 1982–83 1983–84 1984–85
2	Alonzo Mourning	453	1988–89 1989–90 1990–91 1991–92
3	Dikembe Mutombo	354	1988–89 1989–90 1990–91
4	Roy Hibbert	259	2004–05 2005–06 2006–07 2007–08
5	Ruben Boumtje Boumtje	255	1997–98 1998–99 1999–00 2000–01
6	Othella Harrington	201	1992–93 1993–94 1994–95 1995–96
7	Mike Sweetney	180	2000–01 2001–02 2002–03
8	Jahidi White	152	1994–95 1995–96 1996–97 1997–98
9	Jameel Watkins	150	1996–97 1997–98 1998–99 1999–00
10	Mikael Hopkins	148	2011–12 2012–13 2013–14 2014–15

Season
Rank	Player	Blocks	Season
1	Alonzo Mourning	169	1988–89
2	Alonzo Mourning	160	1991–92
3	Dikembe Mutombo	151	1990–91
4	Patrick Ewing	135	1984–85
5	Patrick Ewing	133	1983–84
6	Dikembe Mutombo	128	1989–90
7	Patrick Ewing	119	1981–82
8	Mike Sweetney	109	2002–03
9	Patrick Ewing	106	1982–83
10	Roy Hibbert	90	2006–07

Single game
Rank	Player	Blocks	Season	Opponent
1	Dikembe Mutombo	12	1988–89	St. John's
