= Big East men's basketball tournament =

American collegiate basketball championship

- Conference basketball championship
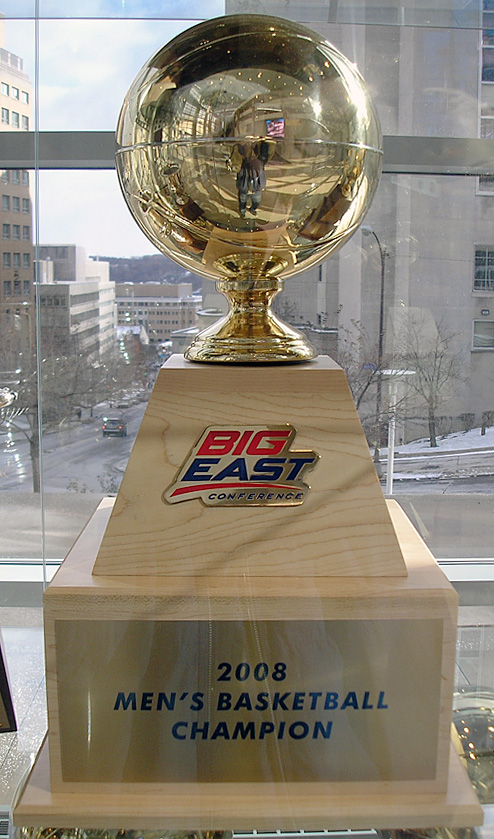
- The 2008 Big East Men's Basketball Tournament trophy
- Sport: College basketball
- Conference: Big East Conference
- Number of teams: 11
- Format: Single-elimination tournament
- Current stadium: Madison Square Garden
- Current location: New York City
- Played: 1980–present
- Last contest: 2026
- Current champion: St. John's Red Storm
- Most championships: UConn Huskies, Georgetown Hoyas (8)
- Official website: BigEast.org

Host stadiums
- Providence Civic Center (1980); Carrier Dome (1981); Hartford Civic Center (1982); Madison Square Garden (1983–present)

Host locations
- Providence, Rhode Island (1980); Syracuse, New York (1981); Hartford, Connecticut (1982); New York City (1983–present)

The Big East men's basketball tournament is the championship tournament of the Big East Conference in men's basketball. The winner receives the conference's automatic bid to the NCAA tournament.

As part of the 2013 deal in which seven schools left the original Big East Conference of 1979–2013 to form a new Big East Conference and the original conference became the American Athletic Conference, the new Big East received the rights to the conference tournament.

== Venue ==
Since 1983, the tournament has been held in Madison Square Garden in New York City. As such, the tournament is the longest-running conference tournament at any one site in all of college basketball. Madison Square Garden has a contract with the Big East Conference to host the tournament through 2028.

== Notable events ==
The 2009 tournament featured a six-overtime game in the quarterfinals between the Connecticut Huskies and the Syracuse Orange, in which Syracuse prevailed, 127–117. The game, the second-longest in NCAA history, started on the evening of March 12 and ended nearly four hours later in the early morning of March 13.

In 2011, Connecticut, led by Kemba Walker, became the first and only team in the Big East tournament ever to win five games in five consecutive days to win the championship.

On March 12, 2020, the 2020 tournament was cancelled during halftime of the first quarterfinal game due to the COVID-19 pandemic. The conference received an insurance payout of $10.5 million as a result of the tournament's cancellation.

In 2021, Georgetown won four games in four days as an underdog in each contest, to win its record eighth title. Georgetown became the first eighth-seeded team to win the championship, and Patrick Ewing became the first person to win the championship as both a player and a head coach.

In 2024, UConn won the championship for the eighth time, tying it with Georgetown for the most titles.

Only three players have achieved multiple Most Valuable Player honors: Georgetown's Patrick Ewing (1984–1985), Louisville's Peyton Siva (2012–2013), and Villanova's Josh Hart (2015, 2017).

== Seeding ==
From 1980 through 2000, all Big East member schools qualified for the Big East tournament. The Big East limited participation to 12 schools from 2001 to 2008, but since 2009, all member schools again have qualified for the tournament. The conference has based tournament seeding strictly on conference record and tiebreakers except between 1996 and 1998 and between 2001 and 2003; during those years, the conference used a divisional structure which also affected seeding.

=== 1980–1995 ===
In 1980, with seven member schools, the #2 through #7 seeds played in an opening quarterfinal round and the #1 seed received a bye until the semifinal round. In 1981, the conference expanded to eight teams, and in 1981 and 1982, all eight teams began play in a quarterfinal round. After the conference expanded again, to nine teams, the #8 and #9 seeds played in a single first-round game and schools seeded #7 or higher received a bye into the quarterfinal round; adopted in 1983, this format persisted through the 1991 tournament. After the Big East expanded to 10 teams, the 1992 tournament had two first-round games for the #7 through #10 seeds, teams seeded #6 or higher getting a bye into the quarterfinal round. This format continued through the 1995 tournament.

=== 1996–2000 ===
For the 1995–96 Big East Conference men's basketball season, the Big East expanded to 13 teams and adopted a divisional structure, with teams divided between the Big East 6 Division and the Big East 7 Division. The expansion resulted in a new tournament format in which the #4 through #13 seeds played in the first round and only the #1 through #3 seeds received byes into the quarterfinals. This format lasted through the 2000 tournament.

During the existence of the Big East 6 and Big East 7 divisions, seeding criteria also changed, with the winners of each division receiving the #1 and #2 seeds regardless of record, the second-place team with the best record receiving the #3 seed, and the rest of the schools receiving the #4 through #13 seeds based on conference record and tiebreakers. After the 1998 tournament, the Big East scrapped the divisions and returned to a unitary conference structure, and tournament seeding again was based strictly on conference record and tiebreakers in 1999 and 2000.

=== 2001–2003 ===
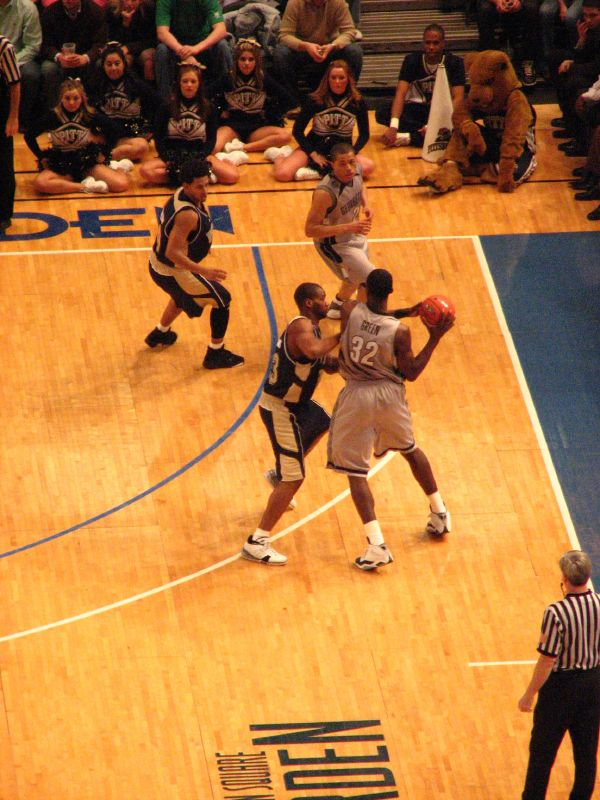
Jeff Green of the Georgetown Hoyas attempts to pass during the 2007 Big East Championship game against the Pitt Panthers.

From 2001 through 2003, when the Big East again was divided into two divisions — an East and a West Division, each of seven teams — teams were seeded #1 through #6 by division. The third- through sixth-place finishers in each division (a total of eight teams) received the #3 through #6 seeds in each division and played in the first round, with the #3 East seed playing the #6 West seed, the #4 East seed playing the #5 West seed, the #5 East seed playing the #4 West seed, and the #6 East seed playing the #3 West seed. The first- and second-place finishers in each division (a total of four teams) received the #1 and #2 divisional seeds and a bye into the quarterfinal round. Two teams — the seventh-place finishers in each division, after the application of any necessary tiebreaking criteria — did not qualify for the tournament.

=== 2004–2008 ===
In 2004, after the Big East again eliminated its division structure, its 14 schools again were seeded based on conference record and tiebreakers. The teams which finished below 12th place did not qualify for the tournament. The #5 through #12 seeds played in the first round, and the #1 through #4 seeds received byes into the quarterfinal round.

In 2005 the conference's membership dropped to 12 schools, and St. John's was ineligible for the tournament due to sanctions imposed on its program. The other 11 teams were seeded based on conference record and tiebreakers, and the #6 though #11 seeds played in the first round, while the #1 through #5 seeds received byes into the quarterfinal round.

The Big East's membership stood at 16 schools from 2006 through 2008. During these years, seeding returned to its 2004 format: Only the teams which finished 12th or higher in the conference after the application as necessary of tiebreaking criteria qualified for the tournament, the #5 through #12 seeds played in the first round, and the #1 through #4 seeds received byes into the quarterfinal round.

=== 2009–2013 ===
In 2009, the conference returned to a tournament format that included all member schools (16 from 2009 to 2012, and 14 in 2013). From 2009 through 2012, the teams seeded #9 through #16 played first-round games, teams seeded #5 through #8 received a bye to the second round, and the top four teams received a double-bye to the quarterfinals. The final Big East tournament held by the original Big East Conference, which took place in 2013, saw only 14 teams compete—West Virginia had left the Big East for the Big 12 Conference after the 2011–12 season, and Connecticut was barred from the tournament due to an NCAA postseason ban for academic reasons. In that tournament, the teams seeded #11 through #14 played in the first round, teams seeded #5 through #10 received a bye to the second round, and the top four teams received a double-bye to the quarterfinals.

Throughout the 2009–2013 period, all member schools participating in the tournament were seeded in the tournament based on their conference records. Ties were broken using a set of tiebreaker rules, with the first two tiebreakers being head-to-head record and common record against the next-best conference team.

=== 2014–present ===
During the offseason in 2013, seven schools left the original Big East Conference of 1979–2013 and joined three other schools in forming a new Big East Conference, the old conference becoming the American Athletic Conference (marketed as "The American"). The new Big East Conference took over control of the Big East tournament at Madison Square Garden. From 2014 (the first tournament held after the formation of the new Big East) through 2019 all 10 member schools took part in the tournament, with tiebreakers similar to those used prior to the formation of the new conference employed as needed. The #7 through #10 seeds played in two first-round games, and all schools seeded #6 or higher received a bye into the quarterfinal round. The 2020 tournament would have followed the same format if it had not been canceled after the first round due to the covid-19 pandemic.

In 2021, after the Big East expanded to 11 teams with Connecticut's move to the Big East from the American Athletic Conference, the Big East tournament adopted an 11-team format in which the #6 through #11 seeds play in three first-round games and teams seeded #5 or higher receive a bye into the quarterfinal round.

== Tournament results ==
Year	Champion	Score	Runner-up	Tournament MVP	Location
1980	Georgetown	87–81	Syracuse	Craig Shelton, Georgetown	Providence Civic Center (Providence, Rhode Island)
1981	Syracuse	83–80	Villanova	Leo Rautins, Syracuse	Carrier Dome (Syracuse, New York)
1982	Georgetown	72–54	Villanova	Eric Floyd, Georgetown	Hartford Civic Center (Hartford, Connecticut)
1983	St. John's	85–77	Boston College	Chris Mullin, St. John's	Madison Square Garden (New York City)
1984	Georgetown	82–71	Syracuse	Patrick Ewing, Georgetown	Madison Square Garden (New York City)
1985	Georgetown	92–80	St. John's	Patrick Ewing, Georgetown	Madison Square Garden (New York City)
1986	St. John's	70–69	Syracuse	Dwayne Washington, Syracuse	Madison Square Garden (New York City)
1987	Georgetown	69–59	Syracuse	Reggie Williams, Georgetown	Madison Square Garden (New York City)
1988	Syracuse	85–68	Villanova	Sherman Douglas, Syracuse	Madison Square Garden (New York City)
1989	Georgetown	88–79	Syracuse	Charles Smith, Georgetown	Madison Square Garden (New York City)
1990	Connecticut	78–75	Syracuse	Chris Smith, UConn	Madison Square Garden (New York City)
1991	Seton Hall	74–62	Georgetown	Oliver Taylor, Seton Hall	Madison Square Garden (New York City)
1992	Syracuse	56–54	Georgetown	Alonzo Mourning, Georgetown	Madison Square Garden (New York City)
1993	Seton Hall	103–70	Syracuse	Terry Dehere, Seton Hall	Madison Square Garden (New York City)
1994	Providence	74–64	Georgetown	Michael Smith, Providence	Madison Square Garden (New York City)
1995	Villanova	94–78	Connecticut	Kerry Kittles, Villanova	Madison Square Garden (New York City)
1996	Connecticut	75–74	Georgetown	Victor Page, Georgetown	Madison Square Garden (New York City)
1997	Boston College	70–58	Villanova	Scoonie Penn, Boston College	Madison Square Garden (New York City)
1998	Connecticut	69–64	Syracuse	Khalid El-Amin, UConn	Madison Square Garden (New York City)
1999	Connecticut	82–63	St. John's	Kevin Freeman, UConn	Madison Square Garden (New York City)
2000	St. John's	80–70	Connecticut	Bootsy Thornton, St. John's	Madison Square Garden (New York City)
2001	Boston College	79–57	Pittsburgh	Troy Bell, Boston College	Madison Square Garden (New York City)
2002	Connecticut	74–65*	Pittsburgh	Caron Butler, UConn	Madison Square Garden (New York City)
2003	Pittsburgh	74–56	Connecticut	Julius Page, Pittsburgh	Madison Square Garden (New York City)
2004	Connecticut	61–58	Pittsburgh	Ben Gordon, UConn	Madison Square Garden (New York City)
2005	Syracuse	68–59	West Virginia	Hakim Warrick, Syracuse	Madison Square Garden (New York City)
2006	Syracuse	65–61	Pittsburgh	Gerry McNamara, Syracuse	Madison Square Garden (New York City)
2007	Georgetown	65–42	Pittsburgh	Jeff Green, Georgetown	Madison Square Garden (New York City)
2008	Pittsburgh	74–65	Georgetown	Sam Young, Pittsburgh	Madison Square Garden (New York City)
2009	Louisville	76–66	Syracuse	Jonny Flynn, Syracuse	Madison Square Garden (New York City)
2010	West Virginia	60–58	Georgetown	Da'Sean Butler, West Virginia	Madison Square Garden (New York City)
2011	Connecticut	69–66	Louisville	Kemba Walker, UConn	Madison Square Garden (New York City)
2012	Louisville	50–44	Cincinnati	Peyton Siva, Louisville	Madison Square Garden (New York City)
2013	Louisville	78–61	Syracuse	Peyton Siva, Louisville	Madison Square Garden (New York City)
2014	Providence	65–58	Creighton	Bryce Cotton, Providence	Madison Square Garden (New York City)
2015	Villanova	69–52	Xavier	Josh Hart, Villanova	Madison Square Garden (New York City)
2016	Seton Hall	69–67	Villanova	Isaiah Whitehead, Seton Hall	Madison Square Garden (New York City)
2017	Villanova	74–60	Creighton	Josh Hart, Villanova	Madison Square Garden (New York City)
2018	Villanova	76–66*	Providence	Mikal Bridges, Villanova	Madison Square Garden (New York City)
2019	Villanova	74–72	Seton Hall	Phil Booth, Villanova	Madison Square Garden (New York City)
2020	Canceled after first round due to the COVID-19 pandemic				Madison Square Garden (New York City)
2021	Georgetown	73–48	Creighton	Dante Harris, Georgetown	Madison Square Garden (New York City)
2022	Villanova	54–48	Creighton	Collin Gillespie, Villanova	Madison Square Garden (New York City)
2023	Marquette	65–51	Xavier	Tyler Kolek, Marquette	Madison Square Garden (New York City)
2024	UConn	73–57	Marquette	Tristen Newton, UConn	Madison Square Garden (New York City)
2025	St. John's	82–66	Creighton	RJ Luis Jr., St. John's	Madison Square Garden (New York City)
2026	St. John's	72–52	UConn	Zuby Ejiofor, St. John's	Madison Square Garden (New York City)

== Championships by school ==
School	Championships	Championship Years
Georgetown	8	1980, 1982, 1984, 1985, 1987, 1989, 2007, 2021
UConn	8	1990, 1996, 1998, 1999, 2002, 2004, 2011, 2024
Villanova	6	1995, 2015, 2017, 2018, 2019, 2022
St. John's	5	1983, 1986, 2000, 2025, 2026
Syracuse	5	1981, 1988, 1992, 2005, 2006
Louisville	3	2009, 2012, 2013
Seton Hall	3	1991, 1993, 2016
Boston College	2	1997, 2001
Pittsburgh	2	2003, 2008
Providence	2	1994, 2014
West Virginia	1	2010
Marquette	1	2023
Butler	0	
Cincinnati	0	
Creighton	0	
DePaul	0	
Miami	0	
Notre Dame	0	
Rutgers	0	
South Florida	0	
Virginia Tech	0	
Xavier	0	

NOTES: Italics indicate school is no longer a member of the Big East Conference.

UConn did not move to the new Big East Conference when it was founded in 2013. UConn remained behind in the old Big East Conference, which became the American Athletic Conference in 2013, and therefore participated in the American Athletic Conference men's basketball tournament from 2014 through 2020. UConn moved to the new Big East Conference in 2020 and resumed play in the Big East Tournament in 2021.

Current members Butler and DePaul have yet to make an appearance in the Big East Championship Game. Former members Miami, Notre Dame, Rutgers, South Florida, and Virginia Tech did not appear in the championship game during their respective conference tenures.

=== Performance by team ===
==== 1980–2005 conference alignment ====
Teams (# of titles)		1980	1981	1982	1983	1984	1985	1986	1987	1988	1989	1990	1991	1992	1993	1994	1995	1996	1997	1998	1999	2000	2001	2002	2003	2004	2005
BE (44)		(7)	(8)	(8)	(9)	(9)	(9)	(9)	(9)	(9)	(9)	(9)	(9)	(10)	(10)	(10)	(10)	(13)	(13)	(13)	(13)	(13)	(12)	(12)	(12)	(12)	(11)
1	Georgetown (8)	C	SF	C	QF	C	C	SF	C	QF	C	SF	F	F	QF	F	SF	F	SF	QF	QF	SF	QF	QF	QF	1R	QF
1	Connecticut (8)	SF	QF	QF	QF	QF	QF	1R	1R	QF	QF	C	QF	QF	QF	SF	F	C	1R	C	C	F	1R	C	F	C	SF
3	Villanova (6)	•	F	F	SF	SF	SF	SF	QF	F	QF	SF	SF	QF	1R	QF	C	SF	F	QF	QF	QF	QF	QF	1R	SF	SF
4	Syracuse (5)	F	C	QF	SF	F	SF	F	F	C	F	F	QF	C	F	QF	QF	SF	QF	F	SF	QF	SF	1R	SF	QF	C
5	St. John's (5)	SF	QF	SF	C	SF	F	C	QF	QF	1R	QF	QF	SF	SF	QF	1R	1R	1R	SF	F	C	1R	QF	QF	DNQ	DNQ
6	Seton Hall (3)	QF	QF	QF	QF	1R	1R	QF	QF	SF	SF	QF	C	SF	C	SF	1R	QF	1R	1R	QF	QF	SF	1R	QF	1R	1R
7	Boston College (2)	QF	QF	SF	F	QF	QF	QF	QF	QF	QF	1R	1R	QF	QF	QF	QF	QF	C	QF	1R	1R	C	QF	SF	SF	QF
7	Pittsburgh (2)	•	•	•	QF	QF	QF	QF	SF	SF	SF	QF	QF	1R	QF	1R	QF	1R	QF	1R	1R	1R	F	F	C	F	QF
7	Providence (2)	QF	SF	QF	1R	QF	QF	QF	SF	1R	QF	QF	SF	1R	SF	C	SF	QF	SF	QF	1R	1R	QF	1R	QF	QF	1R
10	West Virginia (1)	•	•	•	•	•	•	•	•	•	•	•	•	•	•	•	•	1R	QF	1R	1R	1R	1R	DNQ	1R	1R	F
11	Miami (0)	•	•	•	•	•	•	•	•	•	•	•	•	QF	1R	1R	QF	QF	QF	1R	SF	SF	1R	SF	1R	DNQ	•
11	Notre Dame (0)	•	•	•	•	•	•	•	•	•	•	•	•	•	•	•	•	1R	1R	1R	1R	QF	QF	SF	1R	QF	1R
11	Rutgers (0)	•	•	•	•	•	•	•	•	•	•	•	•	•	•	•	•	1R	1R	SF	QF	1R	DNQ	1R	DNQ	1R	QF
11	Virginia Tech (0)	•	•	•	•	•	•	•	•	•	•	•	•	•	•	•	•	•	•	•	•	•	DNQ	DNQ	DNQ	QF	•

NOTE: From 2001 through 2003, the teams which finished in last place in the East and West Divisions did not qualify for the tournament. In 2004, teams which finished below 12th place in the conference did not qualify for the tournament. In 2005, St. John's was ineligible for the tournament because of sanctions imposed on its program.

==== 2006–2013 conference alignment ====
Teams (# of titles)		2006	2007	2008	2009	2010	2011	2012	2013
BE (44)		(12)	(12)	(12)	(16)	(16)	(16)	(16)	(14)
1	Georgetown (8)	SF	C	F	1R	F	2R	QF	SF
1	Connecticut (8)	QF	1R	QF	QF	1R	C	QF	DNQ
3	Villanova (6)	SF	QF	QF	SF	QF	1R	2R	QF
4	Syracuse (5)	C	QF	1R	F	QF	SF	SF	F
5	St. John's (5)	DNQ	1R	DNQ	2R	2R	QF	1R	2R
6	Louisville (3)	1R	SF	QF	C	2R	F	C	C
6	Seton Hall (3)	1R	DNQ	1R	2R	2R	1R	2R	2R
8	Pittsburgh (2)	F	F	C	QF	QF	QF	2R	QF
8	Providence (2)	DNQ	1R	1R	QF	1R	1R	1R	2R
10	West Virginia (1)	QF	QF	SF	SF	C	2R	2R	•
11	Cincinnati (0)	1R	DNQ	1R	1R	QF	QF	F	QF
12	Notre Dame (0)	1R	SF	QF	2R	SF	SF	SF	SF
12	Marquette (0)	QF	QF	SF	QF	SF	QF	QF	QF
12	Rutgers (0)	QF	DNQ	DNQ	1R	1R	2R	1R	2R
12	South Florida (0)	DNQ	DNQ	DNQ	1R	2R	2R	QF	1R
12	DePaul (0)	DNQ	1R	DNQ	2R	1R	1R	1R	1R

NOTE: From 2006 through 2008, teams which finished below 12th place in the conference did not qualify for the tournament. In 2013, Connecticut did not qualify for the tournament because of Academic Progress Rate violations

==== Since 2014 realignment ====
through 2026 tournament

Teams (# of titles)		2014	2015	2016	2017	2018	2019	2020	2021	2022	2023	2024	2025	2026
BE (45)		(10)	(10)	(10)	(10)	(10)	(10)	(10)	(11)	(11)	(11)	(11)	(11)	(11)
1	Georgetown (8)	1R	SF	QF	1R	1R	QF	1R	C	1R	1R	1R	1R	SF
1	UConn (8)	•	•	•	•	•	•	•	SF	SF	SF	C	SF	F
3	Villanova (6)	QF	C	F	C	C	C	DNP	QF	C	QF	QF	QF	QF
4	St. John's (5)	QF	QF	1R	QF	QF	QF	QFC	QF	QF	QF	SF	C	C
5	Seton Hall (3)	SF	1R	C	SF	QF	F	DNP	SF	QF	1R	QF	1R	SF
6	Providence (2)	C	SF	SF	QF	F	QF	DNP	1R	SF	QF	SF	1R	QF
7	Marquette (1)	QF	QF	QF	QF	QF	SF	DNP	1R	QF	C	F	SF	1R
8	Creighton (0)	F	QF	QF	F	QF	QF	DNP	F	F	SF	QF	F	QF
8	Xavier (0)	SF	F	SF	SF	SF	SF	1R	1R	1R	F	QF	QF	QF
8	Butler (0)	1R	QF	QF	QF	SF	1R	DNP	QF	QF	1R	1R	QF	1R
8	DePaul (0)	QF	1R	1R	1R	1R	1R	QFC	QF	1R	QF	1R	QF	1R

NOTE: The 2020 tournament was canceled during halftime of the first quarterfinal game due to the COVID-19 pandemic. Georgetown lost its first-round game to St. John's and Xavier lost its first-round game to DePaul; Creighton and St. John's did not complete their quarterfinal game, and none of the other teams played their quarterfinal games.

Key

C	Champion
F	Lost in Final
SF	Lost in Semifinals
QF	Lost in Quarterfinals
2R	Lost in Second Round
1R	Lost in First Round
QFC	Won first round; quarterfinal cancelled
DNP	Did not play (bye in first round; quarterfinal cancelled)
DNQ	Did not qualify for tournament
•	Not a conference member

== Television coverage ==
Before the new Big East Conference was founded during the offseason in 2013, the original Big East was the only conference to have every tournament game broadcast nationwide on the ESPN family of networks, with every game from the second round forward broadcast on ESPN itself. The first year the tournament was broadcast in 3D on ESPN 3D was in 2011.

In 2014 and 2015, FS1 broadcast the entire Big East tournament. From 2016 through 2023, Fox broadcast the championship game and FS1 aired the rest. In 2024, Fox broadcast one of the semifinal games and the championship game, and FS1 aired the rest. In 2025, Peacock televised the first five games (all three first-round games and the first two quarterfinals), FS1 aired the next two (the third and fourth quarterfinal games), and Fox broadcast the last three (both semifinal games and the championship game). In 2026, Peacock televised all three first-round games and the first two quarterfinal games — with all Peacock games simulcast on NBCSN — and FS1 broadcast the third and fourth quarterfinal games; in the semifinals, FOX aired the first game and FS1 the second game; and Fox broadcast the championship game.
