= 1977–78 Georgetown Hoyas men's basketball team =

American college basketball season

1977–78 Georgetown Hoyas men's basketball

Hoya Invitational Tournament Champions ECAC Holiday Festival Champions National Invitation Tournament, Fourth place
- Conference: Independent

Ranking
- Coaches: No. 20
- Record: 23–8
- Head coach: John Thompson (6th season)
- Assistant coaches: Bill Stein (5th season); Bob Grier (1st season)
- Captain: Derrick Jackson
- Home arena: McDonough Gymnasium

1977–78 NCAA Division I men's basketball independents standings
	Conf.				Overall
Team	W		L	PCT	W		L	PCT
No. 3 DePaul		–		–	27	–	3	.900
No. 18 Detroit		–		–	25	–	4	.862
Illinois State		–		–	24	–	4	.857
No. 8 Marquette		–		–	24	–	4	.857
Pan American		–		–	22	–	4	.846
VCU		–		–	24	–	5	.828
Fairfield		–		–	22	–	5	.815
North Texas State		–		–	22	–	6	.786
Syracuse		–		–	22	–	6	.786
Rhode Island		–		–	24	–	7	.774
Providence		–		–	24	–	8	.750
St. John's		–		–	21	–	7	.750
Utah State		–		–	21	–	7	.750
Georgetown		–		–	23	–	8	.742
No. 6 Notre Dame		–		–	23	–	8	.742
Holy Cross		–		–	20	–	7	.741
Northeast Louisiana		–		–	20	–	7	.741
UNC Wilmington		–		–	19	–	7	.731
St. Bonaventure		–		–	21	–	8	.724
UNLV		–		–	20	–	8	.714
Virginia Tech		–		–	19	–	8	.704
James Madison		–		–	18	–	8	.692
Maine		–		–	17	–	8	.680
Army		–		–	19	–	9	.679
Dayton		–		–	19	–	10	.655
St. Francis (NY)		–		–	16	–	9	.640
Iona		–		–	17	–	10	.630
William & Mary		–		–	16	–	10	.615
Air Force		–		–	15	–	10	.600
Loyola (IL)		–		–	16	–	11	.593
Mercer		–		–	16	–	11	.593
Oklahoma City		–		–	16	–	11	.593
Seton Hall		–		–	16	–	11	.593
Boston College		–		–	15	–	11	.577
Butler		–		–	15	–	11	.577
Saint Francis (PA)		–		–	15	–	11	.577
South Carolina		–		–	16	–	12	.571
Siena		–		–	13	–	10	.565
Navy		–		–	14	–	11	.560
Milwaukee		–		–	15	–	12	.556
Niagara		–		–	14	–	12	.538
Northeastern		–		–	14	–	12	.538
Southern Mississippi		–		–	13	–	12	.520
Portland State		–		–	14	–	13	.519
Stetson		–		–	14	–	13	.519
Oral Roberts		–		–	13	–	14	.481
Xavier		–		–	13	–	14	.481
Cleveland State		–		–	12	–	13	.480
Tennessee State		–		–	11	–	12	.478
Catholic		–		–	12	–	14	.462
Manhattan		–		–	12	–	14	.462
Georgia Southern		–		–	12	–	15	.444
Northwestern State		–		–	12	–	15	.444
Connecticut		–		–	11	–	15	.423
Old Dominion		–		–	11	–	15	.423
Vermont		–		–	11	–	15	.423
Boston University		–		–	10	–	15	.400
Hardin–Simmons		–		–	10	–	16	.385
Campbell		–		–	9	–	15	.375
Centenary (LA)		–		–	10	–	17	.370
Denver		–		–	10	–	17	.370
Colgate		–		–	9	–	17	.346
East Carolina		–		–	9	–	17	.346
Fordham		–		–	8	–	18	.308
Long Island		–		–	8	–	18	.308
Saint Peter's		–		–	8	–	18	.308
Baptist		–		–	8	–	19	.296
Samford		–		–	8	–	19	.296
Canisius		–		–	7	–	19	.269
Houston Baptist		–		–	7	–	19	.269
New Hampshire		–		–	7	–	19	.269
Wagner		–		–	7	–	19	.269
Evansville		–		–	1	–	3	.250
Fairleigh Dickinson		–		–	6	–	18	.250
Valparaiso		–		–	6	–	19	.240
Robert Morris		–		–	4	–	19	.174
Richmond		–		–	4	–	22	.154
Hawaii		–		–	1	–	26	.037
Rankings from AP Poll

The 1977–78 Georgetown Hoyas men's basketball team represented Georgetown University during the 1977–78 NCAA Division I college basketball season. John Thompson, coached them in his sixth season as head coach. An independent, Georgetown played its home games at McDonough Gymnasium on the Georgetown campus in Washington, D.C., and finished the season with a record of 23–8. Knocked out of the ECAC South-Upstate Region tournament in the semifinals, the team missed an NCAA tournament bid for the second consecutive season. The Hoyas instead appeared in the 1978 National Invitation Tournament (NIT), their second straight NIT appearance, and finished in fourth place.

== Season recap ==
After going 2–2 to open the season, the 1977–78 Hoyas set a new school record for most consecutive victories, winning 13 games in a row between December 7, 1977, and January 28, 1978. Senior guard and team captain Derrick Jackson led the way, continuing a streak of scoring in double figures begun the previous season that stretched to 44 straight games before ending this year. Early in the season, Jackson surpassed Jonathan Smith as the top Hoya scorer of all time; by mid-season, he had become the first Hoya to score more than 1,500 points in his career.

During the streak, Georgetown played in the ECAC Holiday Festival at Madison Square Garden in New York City, winning both games, one of which was an upset of No. 12-ranked Holy Cross on December 27; sophomore guard John Duren averaged 22 points per game in the two games and was declared the tournament's Most Valuable Player. Duren would go on to score in double figures in 27 of the season's 31 games. In the second game of the tournament, against Alabama on December 29, junior forward Steve Martin scored 18 points.

Sophomore forward Craig "Big Sky" Shelton scored 25 points against Maryland in the second game of the year, but suffered a broken wrist early in the season and missed five games. After returning to action, he scored 20 or more points eight times during the last 19 games of the year, finishing the season with an average of 14.1 points per game.

Senior center Ed Hopkins scored 29 points against North Carolina Central. Junior forward Al Dutch's free-throw shooting prowess helped Georgetown in two big wins over Seton Hall and Manhattan, but otherwise he had a difficult season, averaging only 5.0 points and 3.8 rebounds per game. Thompson announced the following summer that Dutch would take the 1978–79 season off for personal reasons and return to the team for the 1979–80 season.

A highlight of the regular season was the visit of No. 17-ranked Detroit – led by Terry Duerod, John Long, and Terry Tyler, and coached by Dick Vitale – to McDonough Gymnasium on February 11, 1978. Detroit had a record of 19-1 and the longest winning streak in the nation at the time and was averaging 93.5 points per game, while Georgetown had just dropped out of the Top 20 entirely – plunging from No. 14 the week before – thanks to a pair of losses to begin the month. Shelton played an outstanding defensive game and scored 20 points, while Steve Martin scored 22 and Ed Hopkins pulled down a career-high 16 rebounds. Although the Hoyas trailed with less than a minute to play, they came back to tie the game and then Shelton dunked over Tyler to give Georgetown an 82–80 lead. The Hoyas upset Detroit 83–82.

Eleven days later, George Washington visited McDonough. After the Colonials scored to take the lead with two seconds left to play, Thompson put senior reserve guard Craig Esherick into the game. Esherick caught the inbounds pass at halfcourt and put up a 40-foot (12-meter) shot that scored as time expired to tie the game and force overtime. Esherick's shot was arguably the greatest of the 1970s for the Hoyas, and Georgetown went on to win in overtime, 78–77.

Although retaining its status as an independent, Georgetown was in its fourth season as a member of the Eastern College Athletic Conference (ECAC), a loosely organized sports federation that held three regional post-season Division I basketball tournaments in 1978 for independent Eastern colleges and universities similar to the end-of-season conference tournaments held by conventional college basketball conferences, with each tournament winner receiving an at-large bid to the 1978 NCAA Division I men's basketball tournament. Georgetown had won the ECAC South Region tournament in 1975 and 1976 to secure an NCAA bid; this year the Hoyas participated in the ECAC Upstate-South Region tournament as a heavy favorite to win a third ECAC regional title. However, just before the opening tip of the first game of the tournament, a semifinal contest against Virginia Commonwealth, Derrick Jackson was rushed to the hospital with what was thought to be an attack of acute appendicitis but turned out to be a duodenal ulcer. The illness brought his senior season to an end, and the Hoyas sorely missed him in the game; although Duren scored 23 points, Virginia Commonwealth beat Georgetown 88–75. Jackson ended the season with a school-record 88% free-throw shooting percentage for the year that has yet to equalled, and a 49% field-goal and 77% free-throw shooting percentage for his career. He had been the school's leading scorer in three seasons.

The ECAC Tournament loss meant that the Hoyas missed an NCAA tournament bid for the second year in a row. Georgetown instead accepted an invitation to the 1978 National Invitation Tournament (NIT), its second consecutive NIT appearance. In the first round, played at Virginia, the Hoyas fell behind the Cavaliers, but Duren scored 22 points and had 11 assists and Georgetown came back to tie the game and force overtime. With seconds left in overtime and the game tied 68-68, senior guard Mike Riley managed to draw an offensive foul on a Virginia inbounds pass, then sank both his free throws to give Georgetown a 70–68 win. The 1977–78 squad thus became the first Georgetown men's basketball team to win a game in either the National Invitation Tournament or NCAA Division I men's basketball tournament since the 1942–43 team advanced to the final of the 1943 NCAA tournament.

Georgetown next beat Dayton in the second round, with Duren scoring 17 points and Steve Martin shooting 10-for-10 from the free-throw line and scoring 18. The Hoyas faced North Carolina State in the semifinal. Duren had a 26-point game, Shelton scored 25, and Esherick again scored on a last-minute shot to tie the game as the clock expired and force overtime. Georgetown was leading 85–84 in overtime with almost no time left and on the brink of going to the first NIT final in school history when North Carolina State's Clyde Austin scored on a 40-foot (12-meter) last-second shot to give the Wolfpack an 86–85 win. The Hoyas had to settle for an appearance in the third-place game against Rutgers, which Georgetown lost for a fourth-place finish despite John Duren's 23-point effort. During the NIT, Craig Shelton had shot 61 percent from the field and averaged 16 points and nine rebounds per game.

Unranked in the Associated Press Poll at the end of the year, the Hoyas were ranked No. 20 for the season in the Coaches' Poll. They would not play in the NIT again until the 1992–93 season. During each of the 14 intervening seasons, Georgetown would receive an NCAA Tournament bid.

Although English bulldogs named Jack have appeared along the sidelines of Georgetown basketball times during various seasons since 1962, the 1977–78 season was the first in which a human in a bulldog costume portrayed Jack the Bulldog. Originated by Georgetown freshman Pat Sheehan, who was Jack for four seasons before graduating in 1981, (Note: Sheehan went on to a banking career in New York City and died in an automobile accident on November 9, 2013.) the human Jack the Bulldog has been a fixture at Georgetown games ever since.

== Roster ==
Senior guard Craig Esherick would later serve as an assistant coach for the Hoyas from 1982 to 1999 and as head coach from 1999 to 2004. Senior guard Mike Riley would later serve as a Hoya assistant coach from 1982 to 2004.

#	Name	Height	Weight (lbs.)	Position	Class	Hometown	Previous team(s)
10	Craig Esherick	6'3"	N/A	G	Sr.	Silver Spring, MD, U.S.	Springbrook HS
12	Mike Riley	5'8"	N/A	G	Sr.	Washington, DC, U.S.	United States Navy
20	Steve Martin	6'4"	175	F	Jr.	New Orleans, LA, U.S.	St. Augustine HS
22	Derrick Jackson	6'0"	180	G	Sr.	Wheaton, IL, U.S.	Wheaton Central HS
24	Lonnie Duren	6'1"	N/A	G	So.	Washington, DC, U.S.	Augusta Military Academy (Fort Defiance, VA)
25	Al Dutch	6'7"	190	F	Jr.	Washington, DC, U.S.	Archbishop Carroll HS
33	Craig "Big Sky" Shelton	6'7"	210	F	So.	Washington, DC, U.S.	Dunbar HS
34	Terry Fenlon	6'2"	N/A	G	So.	Washington, DC, U.S.	Mount St. Mary's University
42	Felix Yeoman	6'7"	N/A	F/C	Sr.	Washington, DC, U.S.	St. Anthony's HS
44	John Duren	6'3"	150	G	So.	Washington, DC, U.S.	Dunbar HS
51	Mike Frazier	6'7"	N/A	F	So.	Cleveland, OH, U.S.	University School
52	Ed Hopkins	6'9"	225	C	Sr.	Baltimore, MD, U.S.	Edmondson-Westside HS
55	Tom Scates	6'11"	N/A	C	Jr.	Alexandria, VA, U.S.	St. Anthony's HS, (Washington, DC)

== Rankings ==
The 1977-78 squad was only the second team in Georgetown men's basketball history to be ranked in the Associated Press Poll, and the first one to be ranked since the 1952-53 team's No. 20 ranking for a week in January 1953. It also ended the season ranked No. 20 in the Coaches' Poll, becoming the first Georgetown men's basketball team in history to finish a season with a national ranking.

Ranking movement Legend: ██ Improvement in ranking. ██ Decrease in ranking. ██ Not ranked the previous week. RV=Others receiving votes.
Poll	Pre	Wk 1	Wk 2	Wk 3	Wk 4	Wk 5	Wk 6	Wk 7	Wk 8	Wk 9	Wk 10	Wk 11	Wk 12	Wk 13	Wk 14	Wk 15	Final
AP							20	17	19	16	14		18	18	17		
Coaches		– (Note: No Coaches' Poll this week.)					15	12	15	14	11	15	15	16	14	20	–

== 1977–78 schedule and results ==
Sources

- All times are Eastern

Date time, TV	Rank^{#}	Opponent^{#}	Result	Record	Site (attendance) city, state
Regular season
Sun., Nov. 27, 1977 no, no		vs. Navy; Tip-Off Tournament	W 71–56	1-0	Capital Centre (4,500); Landover, MD
Mon., Nov. 28, 1977 no, no		vs. No. 14 Maryland; Tip-Off Tournament	L 87–91	1-1	Capital Centre (6,500); Landover, MD
Wed., Nov. 30, 1977 no, no		Dickinson	W 50–33	2-1	McDonough Gymnasium (1,600); Washington, DC
Sat., Dec. 3, 1977 no, no		at St. Bonaventure	L 67–71	2-2	Reilly Center (5,319); Olean, NY
Wed., Dec. 7, 1977 no, no		Wagner	W 96–65	3-2	McDonough Gymnasium (1,468); Washington, DC
Sat., Dec. 10, 1977 no, no		Xavier of Louisiana; Hoya Invitational Tournament	W 108–68	4-2	McDonough Gymnasium (2,178); Washington, DC
Sun., Dec. 11, 1977 no, no		Georgia; Hoya Invitational Tournament	W 66–60	5-2	McDonough Gymnasium (3,079); Washington, DC
Sun., Dec. 18, 1977 no, no		at St. Joseph's	W 61–55 ^{2OT}	6-2	Palestra (1,856); Philadelphia, PA
Tue., Dec. 27, 1977 no, no		vs. No. 12 Holy Cross; ECAC Holiday Festival	W 79–65	7-2	Madison Square Garden (16,411); New York, NY
Thu., Dec. 29, 1977 no, no		vs. Alabama; ECAC Holiday Festival	W 83–73	8-2	Madison Square Garden (11,006); New York, NY
Tue., Jan. 3, 1978 no, no	No. 20	North Carolina Central	W 107–65	9-2	McDonough Gymnasium (2,895); Washington, DC
Sat., Jan. 7, 1978 no, no	No. 20	St. John's	W 72–61	10-2	McDonough Gymnasium (3,859); Washington, DC
Wed., Jan. 11, 1978 no, no	No. 20	Navy	W 56–53	11-2	McDonough Gymnasium (2,200); Washington, DC
Sat., Jan. 17, 1978 no, no	No. 17	South Carolina	W 47–43	12-2	McDonough Gymnasium (3,495); Washington, DC
Wed., Jan. 18, 1978 no, no	No. 19	at Seton Hall	W 70–69	13-2	Walsh Gymnasium (3,200); South Orange, NJ
Wed., Jan. 25, 1978 no, no	No. 16	American	W 72–68	14-2	McDonough Gymnasium (3,532); Washington, DC
Sat., Jan. 28, 1978 no, no	No. 14	New England College	W 80–30	15-2	McDonough Gymnasium (1,851); Washington, DC
Wed., Feb. 1, 1978 no, no	No. 14	at Boston College	L 76–81	15-3	Roberts Center (3,300); Chestnut Hill, MA
Sat., Feb. 4, 1978 no, no	No. 14	at Loyola (Illinois)	L 65–68 ^{OT}	15-4	Alumni Gym (3,052); Chicago, IL
Mon., Feb. 6, 1978 no, no	No. 14	Stonehill	W 77–55	16-4	McDonough Gymnasium (968); Washington, DC
Sat., Feb. 11, 1978 no, no		No. 17 Detroit	W 83–82	17-4	McDonough Gymnasium (4,500); Washington, DC
Thu., Feb. 16, 1978 no, no	No. 18	at Manhattan	W 81–80	18-4	Madison Square Garden (10,630); New York, NY
Sat., Feb. 18, 1978 no, no	No. 18	St. Peter's	W 55–38	19-4	McDonough Gymnasium (2,841); Washington, DC
Wed., Feb. 22, 1978 no, no	No. 18	George Washington	W 78–77 ^{OT}	20-4	McDonough Gymnasium (4,500); Washington, DC
Sat., Feb. 25, 1978 no, no	No. 18	Holy Cross	W 77–61	21-4	McDonough Gymnasium (4,500); Washington, DC
Sun., Feb. 26, 1978 no, no	No. 18	at Fordham	L 59–63	21-5	Rose Hill Gymnasium (N/A); Bronx, NY
ECAC Upstate-South Region tournament
Wed., Mar. 1, 1978 no, no	No. 17	vs. Virginia Commonwealth; Semifinal	L 75–88	21-6	Charles E. Smith Athletic Center (N/A); Washington, DC
National Invitation tournament
Wed., Mar. 8, 1978 no, no		at Virginia; First Round	W 80–78 ^{OT}	22-6	University Hall (8,500); Charlottesville, VA
Tue., Mar. 14, 1978 no, no		at Dayton; Second Round	W 71–62	23-6	University of Dayton Arena (13,458); Dayton, OH
Sun., Mar. 19, 1978 no, no		vs. North Carolina State; Semifinal	L 85–86 ^{OT}	23-7	Madison Square Garden (N/A); New York, NY
Tue., Mar. 21, 1978 no, no		vs. Rutgers; Third Place	L 72–85	23-8	Madison Square Garden (N/A); New York, NY
*Non-conference game. ^{#}Rankings from AP Poll. (#) Tournament seedings in parentheses. All times are in Eastern Time.
