= 1979–80 Syracuse Orangemen basketball team =

American college basketball season

1979–80 Syracuse Orangemen basketball

NCAA tournament, Regional Semifinals
- Conference: Big East Conference

Ranking
- Coaches: No. 6
- AP: No. 6
- Record: 26–4 (5–1 Big East)
- Head coach: Jim Boeheim (4th season)
- Home arena: Manley Field House

1979–80 Big East men's basketball standings
| | Conf. | | | | Overall |
| Team | W | | L | PCT | W | | L | PCT |
|---|---|---|---|---|---|---|---|---|
| No. 6 Syracuse | 5 | – | 1 | .833 | 26 | – | 4 | .867 |
| No. 13 St. John's | 5 | – | 1 | .833 | 24 | – | 5 | .828 |
| No. 11 Georgetown† | 5 | – | 1 | .833 | 26 | – | 6 | .813 |
| Connecticut | 3 | – | 3 | .500 | 20 | – | 9 | .690 |
| Boston College | 2 | – | 4 | .333 | 19 | – | 10 | .655 |
| Seton Hall | 1 | – | 5 | .167 | 14 | – | 13 | .519 |
| Providence | 0 | – | 6 | .000 | 11 | – | 16 | .407 |
† 1980 Big East tournament winner Rankings from AP poll

The 1979–80 Syracuse Orangemen men's basketball team represented Syracuse University in NCAA Division I men's competition in the 1979–80 academic year. This was their first season as a member of the original Big East Conference, and it saw the beginning of the great Georgetown-Syracuse rivalry that would be a defining feature of the original Big East for the rest of its 34-season existence. The Orangemen finished with an overall record of 26–4 (5–1 Big East). In the 1980 NCAA Tournament Syracuse opened with a 97–83 win over Villanova. But they lost in the Sweet Sixteen vs Iowa 88–77.

== Personnel ==
1979–80 Syracuse Orange men's basketball team
Players
Coaches

| Pos. | # | Name | Height | Weight | Year | Hometown |
|---|---|---|---|---|---|---|
| C | 50 | Roosevelt Bouie | 6 ft 11 in (2.11 m) | 225 lb (102 kg) | Sr | Kendall, New York |
| F | 55 | Louis Orr | 6 ft 8 in (2.03 m) | 175 lb (79 kg) | Sr | Cincinnati, Ohio |
| C | 44 | Danny Schayes | 6 ft 11 in (2.11 m) | 235 lb (107 kg) | Jr | Syracuse, New York |

Head coach

- Jim Boeheim

Assistant coach(es)

Legend

- (C) Team captain
- (S) Suspended
- (I) Ineligible
- (W) Walk-on
- Injured
- Current redshirt

Roster

== Schedule ==
| Date time, TV | Rank^{#} | Opponent^{#} | Result | Record | Site city, state |
Regular season
| December 1* | No. 12 | Cornell | W 107–66 | 1–0 | Manley Field House; Syracuse, NY |
| December 5* | No. 11 | St. Francis | W 93–60 | 2–0 | Manley Field House; Syracuse, NY |
| December 7* | No. 11 | Le Moyne | W 107–61 | 3–0 | Manley Field House; Syracuse, NY |
| December 8* | No. 11 | Illinois State | W 72–70 ^{OT} | 4–0 | Manley Field House; Syracuse, NY |
| December 15* | No. 10 | at Penn State | W 85–72 | 5–0 | Rec Hall; University Park, Pennsylvania |
| December 22* | No. 10 | at Pittsburgh | W 73–66 | 6–0 | Fitzgerald Field House; Pittsburgh, Pennsylvania |
| December 28* | No. 9 | vs. Cornell | W 99–64 | 7–0 | Rochester War Memorial; Rochester, NY |
| December 29* | No. 9 | vs. Villanova | W 92–84 | 8–0 | Rochester War Memorial; Rochester, NY |
| January 2* | No. 9 | Canisius | W 81–49 | 9–0 | Manley Field House; Syracuse, NY |
| January 5 | No. 9 | Seton Hall | W 99–76 | 10–0 (1–0) | Manley Field House; Syracuse, NY |
| January 7* | No. 9 | at West Virginia | W 72–69 | 11–0 (1–0) | WVU Coliseum; Morgantown, WV |
| January 9* | No. 5 | Baltimore | W 94–64 | 12–0 (1–0) | Manley Field House; Syracuse, NY |
| January 11* | No. 5 | at Rhode Island | W 64–54 | 13–0 (1–0) | Providence Civic Center; Providence, RI |
| January 13* | No. 5 | at No. 20 Purdue | W 66–61 | 14–0 (1–0) | Mackey Arena; West Lafayette, IN |
| January 19* | No. 3 | at Old Dominion | L 67–68 | 14–1 (1–0) | Norfolk Scope; Norfolk, Virginia |
| January 21* | No. 6 | Detroit | W 89–83 | 15–1 (1–0) | Manley Field House; Syracuse, NY |
| January 24* | No. 6 | at Rutgers | W 69–66 | 16–1 (1–0) | Rutgers Athletic Center; Piscataway, NJ |
| January 26 | No. 6 | Connecticut | W 99–89 | 17–1 (2–0) | Manley Field House; Syracuse, NY |
| January 30* | No. 4 | Temple | W 93–77 | 18–1 (2–0) | Manley Field House; Syracuse, NY |
| February 2 | No. 4 | at Providence | W 89–69 | 19–1 (3–0) | Providence Civic Center; Providence, RI |
| February 4* | No. 2 | Siena | W 99–64 | 20–1 (3–0) | Manley Field House; Syracuse, NY |
| February 9* | No. 2 | St. Bonaventure | W 105–80 | 21–1 (3–0) | Manley Field House; Syracuse, NY |
| February 12 | No. 2 | Georgetown; Rivalry | L 50–52 | 21–2 (3–1) | Manley Field House; Syracuse, NY |
| February 16 | No. 2 | at No. 7 St. John's | W 72–71 | 22–2 (4–1) | Alumni Hall; Queens, NY |
| February 20* | No. 2 | at Niagara | W 107–82 | 23–2 (4–1) | Niagara University Student Center; Niagara Falls, NY |
| February 23 | No. 4 | at Boston College | W 85–77 | 24–2 (5–1) | Roberts Center; Chestnut Hill, Massachusetts |
Big East tournament
| February 28 | (1) No. 3 | vs. (4) Connecticut; Semifinals | W 92–61 | 25–2 (5–1) | Providence Civic Center; Providence, RI |
| February 28 | (1) No. 3 | vs. (3) No. 20 Georgetown; Championship/Rivalry | L 81–87 | 25–3 (5–1) | Providence Civic Center; Providence, RI |
NCAA Tournament
| March 9 | (1 E) No. 6 | vs. No. 8 E Villanova; Second round | W 97–83 | 26–3 (5–1) | Providence Civic Center; Providence, RI |
| March 14 | (1 E) No. 6 | vs. (5 E) Iowa; Sweet Sixteen | L 77–88 | 26–4 (5–1) | The Spectrum (17,569); Philadelphia, Pennsylvania |
*Non-conference game. ^{#}Rankings from AP Poll. (#) Tournament seedings in parentheses.
