= 1979–80 St. John's Redmen basketball team =

American college basketball season

1979–80 St. John's Redmen men's basketball

Lapchick Memorial Champions ECAC Holiday Festival Champions Big East Regular Season Co-Champions

1980 NCAA tournament, Second Round
- Conference: Big East Conference (1979–2013)

Ranking
- Coaches: No. 13
- AP: No. 13
- Record: 24–5 (5–1 Big East)
- Head coach: Lou Carnesecca
- Assistant coaches: Carmine Calzonetti; Ron Rutledge
- Captains: Reggie Carter; Bernard Rencher
- Home arena: Alumni Hall; Madison Square Garden

1979–80 Big East men's basketball standings
	Conf.				Overall
Team	W		L	PCT	W		L	PCT
No. 6 Syracuse	5	–	1	.833	26	–	4	.867
No. 13 St. John's	5	–	1	.833	24	–	5	.828
No. 11 Georgetown†	5	–	1	.833	26	–	6	.813
Connecticut	3	–	3	.500	20	–	9	.690
Boston College	2	–	4	.333	19	–	10	.655
Seton Hall	1	–	5	.167	14	–	13	.519
Providence	0	–	6	.000	11	–	16	.407
† 1980 Big East tournament winner Rankings from AP poll

The 1979–80 St. John's Redmen basketball team represented St. John's University during the 1979–80 NCAA Division I men's basketball season. The team was coached by Lou Carnesecca in his 12th year at the school. St. John's home games are played at Alumni Hall and Madison Square Garden and the team is a member of the Big East Conference.

== Roster ==
1979–80 St. John's Red Storm men's basketball team
Players
Coaches

Pos.	#	Name	Height	Weight	Year	Previous school	Hometown
F	-	Ray James	6 ft 7 in (2.01 m)	—	So	Alexander Hamilton	Brooklyn, NY
G	-	Ed Kennedy	5 ft 9 in (1.75 m)	—	Sr	Maria Regina	Merrick, NY
G/F	-	Curtis Redding	6 ft 5 in (1.96 m)	—	RS Jr	Canarsie/Kansas State	Brooklyn, NY
G	4	George Garrison	6 ft 0 in (1.83 m)	—	Fr	Bellport	Bellport, NY
G	5	Bernard Rencher (C)	6 ft 1 in (1.85 m)	—	RS Sr	Mater Christi/Notre Dame	Elmhurst, NY
F	11	David Russell	6 ft 7 in (2.01 m)	215 lb (98 kg)	Fr	Bellport	Bellport, NY
G	12	Kevin Williams	6 ft 2 in (1.88 m)	175 lb (79 kg)	Fr	Charles E. Hughes	New York, NY
G	21	Larry Washington (redshirt)	6 ft 0 in (1.83 m)	160 lb (73 kg)	Jr	Canarsie/Texas Tech	Brooklyn, NY
G/F	22	Ron Plair	6 ft 4 in (1.93 m)	—	Jr	William C. Bryant	East Elmhurst, NY
F/C	32	Trevor Jackson	6 ft 8 in (2.03 m)	—	Fr	Springfield Gardens	Rosedale, NY
G	35	Reggie Carter (C)	6 ft 3 in (1.91 m)	—	RS Sr	Long Island Lutheran/Hawaii	New York, NY
F	43	Frank Gilroy	6 ft 6 in (1.98 m)	—	Jr	Holy Cross	Whitesone, NY
G/F	44	Tim Cluess	6 ft 6 in (1.98 m)	—	So	St. Agnes	West Hempstead, NY
C	55	Wayne McKoy	6 ft 9 in (2.06 m)	235 lb (107 kg)	Jr	Long Island Lutheran	Bayside, NY

Head coach

- Lou Carnesecca (St. John's, '50)

Assistant coach(es)

- Carmine Calzonetti
- Ron Rutledge

Legend

- (C) Team captain
- (S) Suspended
- (I) Ineligible
- (W) Walk-on
- Injured
- Current redshirt

== Schedule and results ==
Date time, TV	Rank^{#}	Opponent^{#}	Result	Record	Site city, state
Regular season
11/30/79*	No. 16	Oral Roberts; Lapchick Tournament Opening Round	W 90-78	1-0	Alumni Hall; Queens, NY
12/01/79*	No. 16	Michigan State; Lapchick Tournament Championship	W 88-73	2-0	Alumni Hall; Queens, NY
12/04/79*	No. 9	at Tennessee	L 80-97	2-1	Stokely Athletic Center; Knoxville, TN
12/08/79*	No. 9	Army	W 84-61	3-1	Alumni Hall; Queens, NY
12/11/79*	No. 15	Columbia	W 91-75	4-1	Alumni Hall; Queens, NY
12/15/79*	No. 15	at Rutgers	W 75-64	5-1	Rutgers Athletic Center; Piscataway, NJ
12/23/79*	No. 15	Centenary (LA)	W 92-72	6-1	Alumni Hall; Queens, NY
12/26/79*	No. 15	vs. Lafayette; ECAC Holiday Festival Semifinal	W 68-58	7-1	Madison Square Garden; New York, NY
12/28/79*	No. 15	vs. Boston College; ECAC Holiday Festival Championship	W 78-70	8-1	Madison Square Garden; New York, NY
01/05/80	No. 17	Connecticut	W 83-73	9-1 (1-0)	Alumni Hall; Queens, NY
01/08/80*	No. 14	at Princeton	W 44-42	10-1	Jadwin Gymnasium; Princeton, NJ
01/12/80	No. 14	Seton Hall	W 97-64	11-1 (2-0)	Alumni Hall; Queens, NY
01/14/80*	No. 14	St. Joseph's	W 72-55	12-1	Alumni Hall; Queens, NY
01/16/80	No. 10	at Boston College	W 66-63	13-1 (3-0)	Roberts Center; Chestnut Hill, MA
01/19/80	No. 10	at Georgetown	W 71-69	14-1 (4-0)	McDonough Gymnasium; Washington, D.C.
01/22/80*	No. 9	Manhattan	W 88-64	15-1	Alumni Hall; Queens, NY
01/24/80*	No. 9	Davidson	W 67-48	16-1	Alumni Hall; Queens, NY
01/26/80	No. 9	Villanova	W 81-75	17-1	Alumni Hall; Queens, NY
01/28/80*	No. 9	at Niagara	W 87-63	18-1	Buffalo Memorial Auditorium; Buffalo, NY
02/01/80*	No. 9	at Rhode Island	W 64-63	19-1	Keaney Gymnasium; Kingston, RI
02/03/80*	No. 9	No. 7 Louisville	L 71-76	19-2	Alumni Hall; Queens, NY
02/05/80*	No. 8	Baltimore	W 89-73	20-2	Alumni Hall; Queens, NY
02/09/80*	No. 8	Fordham	W 78-60	21-2	Alumni Hall; Queens, NY
02/16/80	No. 7	No. 2 Syracuse	L 71-72	21-3 (4-1)	Alumni Hall; Queens, NY
02/19/80*	No. 7	at Temple	W 63-58 ^{OT}	22-3	The Palestra; Philadelphia, PA
02/23/80	No. 7	at Providence	W 68-62	23-3 (5-1)	Providence Civic Center; Providence, RI
Big East tournament
02/28/80	No. 8	at Providence; Big East tournament quarterfinal	W 48-44	24-3	Providence Civic Center; Providence, RI
02/29/80	No. 8	vs. No. 20 Georgetown; Big East tournament semifinal	L 66-76	24-4	Providence Civic Center; Providence, RI
NCAA tournament
03/08/80*	No. 13	at No. 20 (6) Purdue; NCAA Second Round	L 72-87	24-5	Mackey Arena; West Lafayette, IN
*Non-conference game. ^{#}Rankings from AP Poll. (#) Tournament seedings in parentheses.

== Team players drafted into the NBA ==
Round	Pick	Player	NBA club
6	120	Bernard Rencher	Chicago Bulls
