= 1980 Big East men's basketball tournament =

- Classification: Division I
- Season: 1979–80
- Teams: 7
- Site: Providence Civic Center; Providence, Rhode Island
- Champions: Georgetown (1st title)
- Winning coach: John Thompson (1st title)
- MVP: Craig Shelton (Georgetown)

1979–80 Big East men's basketball standings
	Conf.				Overall
Team	W		L	PCT	W		L	PCT
No. 6 Syracuse	5	–	1	.833	26	–	4	.867
No. 13 St. John's	5	–	1	.833	24	–	5	.828
No. 11 Georgetown†	5	–	1	.833	26	–	6	.813
Connecticut	3	–	3	.500	20	–	9	.690
Boston College	2	–	4	.333	19	–	10	.655
Seton Hall	1	–	5	.167	14	–	13	.519
Providence	0	–	6	.000	11	–	16	.407
† 1980 Big East tournament winner Rankings from AP poll

The inaugural Big East men's basketball tournament took place at the Providence Civic Center in Providence, Rhode Island, in March 1980. It is a single-elimination tournament with three rounds.

Georgetown, St. John's and Syracuse finished tied for the regular-season championship at 5–1. In head-to-head matchups, Georgetown defeated Syracuse, Syracuse defeated St. John's, and St. John's defeated Georgetown, giving each team a 1–1 head-to-head record. The conference conducted a coin flip to determine to #1 seed in the tournament. The #2 seed would be determined by the head-to-head result. Syracuse won the coin flip and was seeded first, receiving a bye into the semifinals; St. John's received the #2 seed by virtue of its victory over Georgetown.

Georgetown defeated Syracuse in the championship game 87–81.

== Bracket ==
Quarterfinals
4	Connecticut	79
5	Boston College	68
2	#8 St. John's	48
7	Providence	44
3	#20 Georgetown	60
6	Seton Hall	47

Semifinals
1	#3 Syracuse	92
4	Connecticut	61
2	#8 St. John's	66
3	#20 Georgetown	76

Championship Game
1	#3 Syracuse	81
3	#20 Georgetown	87

== Awards ==
Most Valuable Player: Craig Shelton, Georgetown

All Tournament Team

- John Duren, Georgetown
- Eric Floyd, Georgetown
- Marty Headd, Syracuse
- Louis Orr, Syracuse
- David Russell, St. John's
