= 1979–80 Connecticut Huskies men's basketball team =

American college basketball season

1979–80 Connecticut Huskies men's basketball

NIT, First Round
- Conference: Big East Conference
- Record: 20–9 (3–3 Big East)
- Head coach: Dom Perno (3rd season)
- Assistant coaches: Greg Ashford; Jim O’Brien; Bill Stuart
- Home arena: Hugh S. Greer Field House; New Haven Coliseum; Hartford Civic Center

1979–80 Big East men's basketball standings
	Conf.				Overall
Team	W		L	PCT	W		L	PCT
No. 6 Syracuse	5	–	1	.833	26	–	4	.867
No. 13 St. John's	5	–	1	.833	24	–	5	.828
No. 11 Georgetown†	5	–	1	.833	26	–	6	.813
Connecticut	3	–	3	.500	20	–	9	.690
Boston College	2	–	4	.333	19	–	10	.655
Seton Hall	1	–	5	.167	14	–	13	.519
Providence	0	–	6	.000	11	–	16	.407
† 1980 Big East tournament winner Rankings from AP poll

The 1979–80 Connecticut Huskies men's basketball team represented the University of Connecticut in the 1979–80 collegiate men's basketball season. The Huskies completed the season with a 20–9 overall record. The Huskies were members of the Big East Conference where they finished with a 3–3 record. They made it to the first round of the 1980 National Invitation Tournament. The Huskies played their home games at Hugh S. Greer Field House in Storrs, Connecticut, the New Haven Coliseum in New Haven, Connecticut, and the Hartford Civic Center in Hartford, Connecticut and were led by third-year head coach Dom Perno.

== Schedule ==
Date time, TV	Rank^{#}	Opponent^{#}	Result	Record	Site (attendance) city, state
Regular Season
12/1/1979*		Yale	W 83–75	1–0	Hugh S. Greer Field House; Storrs, CT
12/4/1979*		New Hampshire	W 71–62	2–0	Hugh S. Greer Field House; Storrs, CT
12/7/1979*		vs. Richmond; Utah Classic	W 81–79	3–0	Jon M. Huntsman Center; Salt Lake City, UT
12/8/1979*		at Utah; Utah Classic	L 66–73; Forfeited by Utah because of ineligible player	4–0	Jon M. Huntsman Center; Salt Lake City, UT
12/11/1979*		Fairfield	W 66–57	5–0	New Haven Coliseum; New Haven, CT
12/14/1979*		at Rhode Island	L 63–74	5–1	Keaney Gymnasium; Kingston, RI
12/22/1979		Seton Hall	W 89–73	6–1 (1–0)	Hugh S. Greer Field House; Storrs, CT
12/28/1979*		Ohio; Connecticut Mutual Classic	W 95–76	7–1	New Haven Coliseum; New Haven, CT
12/29/1979*		Pittsburgh; Connecticut Mutual Classic	L 72–76	7–2	New Haven Coliseum; New Haven, CT
1/3/1980*		at New Hampshire	L 59–67	7–3	Lundholm Gym; Durham, NH
1/5/1980		at St. John's	L 73–83	7–4 (1–1)	Carnesecca Arena; New York, NY
1/10/1980		Boston College	W 83–71	8–4 (2–1)	Hugh S. Greer Field House; Storrs, CT
1/12/1980*		at Massachusetts	W 72–51	9–4	Curry Hicks Cage; Amherst, MA
1/16/1980*		Fordham	W 66–53	10–4	Hugh S. Greer Field House; Storrs, CT
1/19/1980*		McNeese State	W 73–69	11–4	Hugh S. Greer Field House; Storrs, CT
1/23/1980		Providence	W 74–63	12–4 (3–1)	New Haven Coliseum; New Haven, CT
1/26/1980		at Syracuse; Rivalry	L 89–99	12–5 (3–2)	Manley Field House; Syracuse, NY
1/30/1980*		Manhattan	W 89–66	13–5	New Haven Coliseum; New Haven, CT
2/2/1980		at Georgetown; Rivalry	L 64–84	13–6 (3–3)	McDonough Gymnasium; Washington, D.C.
2/6/1980*		Massachusetts	W 73–55	14–6	Hugh S. Greer Field House; Storrs, CT
2/9/1980*		Rhode Island	L 65–68	14–7	Hartford Civic Center; Hartford, CT
2/13/1980*		Boston University	W 72–65	15–7	Hugh S. Greer Field House; Storrs, CT
2/16/1980*		Central Connecticut	W 66–58	16–7	Hugh S. Greer Field House; Storrs, CT
2/18/1980*		Vermont	W 89–52	17–7	Hugh S. Greer Field House; Storrs, CT
2/20/1980*		at Holy Cross	W 88–70	18–7	Hart Center; Worcester, MA
2/23/1980*		at Maine	W 87–67	19–7	Memorial Gymnasium; Orono, ME
Big East tournament
2/28/1980		vs. Boston College; Quarterfinals	W 79–68	20–7	Providence Civic Center; Providence, RI
2/29/1980		vs. Syracuse; Semifinals/Rivalry	L 61–92	20–8	Providence Civic Center; Providence, RI
NIT
3/5/1980*		St. Peter's; First Round	L 56–61	20–9	Hugh S. Greer Field House; Storrs, CT
*Non-conference game. ^{#}Rankings from AP Poll. (#) Tournament seedings in parentheses. All times are in Eastern Time.

Schedule Source:
