= 1979–80 Georgetown Hoyas men's basketball team =

American college basketball season

1979–80 Georgetown Hoyas men's basketball

Nike Cage Classic Champions Big East tournament champions Big East Regular Season Co-Champions

NCAA tournament, Regional Runner-Up
- Conference: Big East Conference|Big East

Ranking
- Coaches: No. 10
- AP: No. 11
- Record: 26–6 (5–1 Big East)
- Head coach: John Thompson (8th season)
- Assistant coaches: Bill Stein (8th season); Bob Grier (3rd season)
- Captains: John Duren; Craig Shelton
- Home arena: McDonough Gymnasium

1979–80 Big East men's basketball standings
| | Conf. | | | | Overall |
| Team | W | | L | PCT | W | | L | PCT |
|---|---|---|---|---|---|---|---|---|
| No. 6 Syracuse | 5 | – | 1 | .833 | 26 | – | 4 | .867 |
| No. 13 St. John's | 5 | – | 1 | .833 | 24 | – | 5 | .828 |
| No. 11 Georgetown† | 5 | – | 1 | .833 | 26 | – | 6 | .813 |
| Connecticut | 3 | – | 3 | .500 | 20 | – | 9 | .690 |
| Boston College | 2 | – | 4 | .333 | 19 | – | 10 | .655 |
| Seton Hall | 1 | – | 5 | .167 | 14 | – | 13 | .519 |
| Providence | 0 | – | 6 | .000 | 11 | – | 16 | .407 |
† 1980 Big East tournament winner Rankings from AP poll

The 1979–80 Georgetown Hoyas men's basketball team represented Georgetown University in the 1978–79 NCAA Division I college basketball season. John Thompson, Jr., coached them in his eighth season as head coach. It was the Hoyas' first season as members of the original Big East Conference, which began play this season; prior to this year, Georgetown had been an independent during the 38 seasons it had fielded a team since the dissolution of the Eastern Intercollegiate Conference at the end of the 1938–39 season. Georgetown would remain a member of the original Big East for 34 seasons, through the end of the 2012–13 season. The team's penchant for playing tight games decided in the last seconds led to it being nicknamed the Heart Attack Hoyas.

Georgetown played its home games at McDonough Gymnasium on the Georgetown campus in Washington, D.C., and finished the season with a record of 26–6 overall, 5–1 in Big East Conference play. A regular season Big East co-champion, Georgetown also won the Big East tournament championship. In the 1980 NCAA tournament, the Hoyas advanced to the East Region final before losing to Iowa.

== Season recap ==
Senior forward Craig "Big Sky" Shelton had a very strong season. During non-conference games, he shot 10-for-10 from the field against No. 1 Indiana, scored 22 points and shot 10-for-10 from the free-throw line against Houston, had 22 points against Northeastern, scored 20 points and had 10 rebounds against Boston College in the ECAC Holiday Festival, and scored 23 against United States International, 21 against Detroit, and 22 against Holy Cross. At one point he scored on 21 consecutive shots from the field over the course of four games. When Big East Conference play began against Providence, he put in an 18-point performance, and he scored in double figures in every conference game.

Sophomore guard Eric "Sleepy" Floyd had led the team in scoring the previous season, and he continued to do so this season. He had 16 points against United States International, 23 against American, 24 against Boston College, 30 against Wagner, 22 against Detroit, 30 against George Washington, and 21 against Holy Cross. Sophomore center Ed Spriggs, meanwhile, had a 14-point, 10-rebound performance against Maryland; after an ankle injury in the game against Oral Roberts slowed Spriggs, reserve Mike Hancock started at center successfully in the remaining 18 games of the year. Forward Al Dutch, who had taken the previous season off for personal reasons, returned for his senior year and averaged 5.9 points per game but had an unusual streak in the middle of the season in which he scored 12 points each in five straight games.

One early game took on a significance that only became apparent in retrospect. Georgetown and Maryland had begun play against one another in 1907 and had played each other in the regular season once or twice annually in 42 of the 46 seasons since 1935. (Note: The only exceptions were the 1943-44 and 1944-45 seasons, during which Georgetown did not field a team, and the 1945-46 and 1976-77 seasons. See The Georgetown Basketball History Project: Records vs. Opponents - M) During the December 5 game at the D.C. Armory between the Hoyas and the Terrapins, John Thompson and Maryland head coach Lefty Driesell got into a shouting match at midcourt after a technical foul call and did not shake hands after the game. The incident apparently soured relations between the schools, which did not schedule one another for a non-tournament regular-season game again until a single meeting in 1993, and then not again until a single game as part of the Gavitt Tipoff Games in 2015.

The season saw more than its share of memorable games. Georgetown won seven games by five or fewer points, and four of its six losses came in the final seconds or in overtime, leading the team to become known as the "Heart Attack Hoyas" because of the nervous stress they supposedly caused their fans. At Boston College in a Big East game on January 30, 1980, for example, the Hoyas faced an eight-point deficit with 1:09 left in the game; in the pre-shot-clock, pre-three-point-shot era, a comeback from that far back with so little time left was especially difficult. Georgetown scored on a layup, stole the ball and scored on another layup, and then freshman guard Eric Smith, who shot 9-for-10 from the free-throw line during the game, sank two free throws after a Boston College offensive foul to narrow Boston College's lead to two. The Eagles then made one of two free throws of their own to extend their lead to three, but fouled Georgetown center Mike Frazier as he scored with one second left; Frazier then sank his free throw to tie the game and force overtime. Even though four Hoyas had fouled out by the end of overtime, Georgetown pulled out a 97–92 victory before a national ESPN television audience.

On February 13, 1980, Georgetown visited No.3-ranked Syracuse for the last game Syracuse was to play at Manley Field House before moving into the new Carrier Dome for its home games. The odds-on favorite with a 57-game home winning streak at Manley, Syracuse expected to virtually clinch the first Big East regular-season championship by closing Manley with one final victory, and held a 14-point lead over the Hoyas at halftime. Shelton scored 17 points and, late in the game, the Hoyas went on a 15–5 run to tie the score at 50. With five seconds left, Syracuse fouled Sleepy Floyd, and Floyd, who uncharacteristically scored only eight points in the game, sank both his free throws to give Georgetown a 52–50 upset win. In his post-game press conference, John Thompson exulted, "Manley Field House is officially closed." That quote, combined with Georgetown's upset victory on an historic evening in Syracuse basketball, is credited as the beginning of the great Georgetown-Syracuse rivalry that would be one of the defining features of the original Big East Conference for the rest of its 34-year existence.

The Hoyas finished the season with a record of 5–1 in Big East play, giving them a share of the conference's first regular-season championship along with St. John's and Syracuse. In the first Big East tournament, they defeated Syracuse in the final – with Eric Smith playing a fine defensive game and scoring a season-high 17 points and Ed Spriggs putting in a 13-point, 10-rebound performance – to win the first conference tournament championship. Floyd scored 22 points in the quarterfinal against Seton Hall, 20 in the semifinal against St. John's, and 21 against Syracuse. Shelton averaged 16 points per game during the tournament.

The Hoyas were the No. 3 seed in the East Region of the 1980 NCAA Division I men's basketball tournament, the second of 14 consecutive Georgetown NCAA tournament appearances. They received a first-round bye, but the seed nonetheless was a disappointment to the Hoyas as it placed them behind Maryland, which they had defeated during the regular season, and Syracuse, which they had defeated twice in the preceding three weeks. In the second round, they faced an Iona team coached by Jim Valvano and led by center and power forward Jeff Ruland which between the regular season and its championship-winning run in the 1980 ECAC Metro Region tournament had compiled a 29–4 record. The Hoyas held Ruland to 16 points and seven rebounds, but Iona's Alex Middleton had perhaps the best game of his career, scoring 18 points and pulling down 13 rebounds. Craig Shelton, however, scored 27 points, and Al Dutch scored a season-high 16, and the Hoyas narrowly avoided an upset, advancing with a 74–71 win. They thus became only the second Georgetown men's basketball team in history to win a game in an NCAA tournament and the first to do so since the 1942–43 team advanced to the final game of the 1943 NCAA tournament.

Georgetown upset No. 8-ranked Maryland in the East Region semifinal in an emotional game; Shelton got in foul trouble and was limited to seven points, but Eric Smith's defense held Maryland's Albert King to a 6-for-18 shooting performance. Advancing to the regional final, the Hoyas next faced the East Region's No. 5 seed, Iowa. Against Iowa, Georgetown led by 10 points at halftime and extended its lead to 14 in the second half, during which it shot 68.2% from the floor, with Sleepy Floyd scoring a game-high – and career-high – 31 points and Shelton scoring 16 points. But Iowa shot 17-for-21 (81%) in field goal attempts and a perfect 15-for-15 in free throws and closed the gap. With seven seconds left in the game and the Hoyas leading 80–79, Shelton was called for a foul against Iowa's Steve Waite; Waite scored both his free throws to give the Hawkeyes an 81–80 upset victory and bring the Heart Attack Hoyas' season to an end with one final last-second decision.

During Georgetown's three NCAA Tournament games, Sleepy Floyd shot 58 percent from the field, 86 percent from the free throw line, and scored 70 points. He was named the Most Valuable Player of the NCAA Tournament East Regional, and finished the season as the top scorer for Georgetown for the second season in a row. Eric Smith shot 55 percent from the field for the season. Shelton finished his collegiate career as the third-highest-scoring player in Georgetown history despite having played in only seven games in his freshman year. In his final college season, senior point guard John Duren had averaged 12.3 points and 7.1 assists per game, and his 228 assists during the season surpassed the previous Georgetown record by a wide margin; he also played a school-record 1,164 minutes during the year without ever fouling out, and his leadership of the team on the floor at point guard contributed to the Hoyas shooting a Georgetown-record 53% from the field during the season.

The 1979–1980 season saw the end of the annual series between Georgetown and Holy Cross, which had begun in the 1967–1968 season, and the end of the rivalry between the schools.

The 1979–1980 Hoyas were ranked No. 11 in the season's final Associated Press Poll and No. 10 in the final Coaches' Poll.

== Roster ==
| # | Name | Height | Weight (lbs.) | Position | Class | Hometown | Previous Team(s) |
|---|---|---|---|---|---|---|---|
| 10 | Kurt Kaull | 6'3" | N/A | G | Fr. | Wheaton, IL, U.S. | Wheaton Warrenville South HS |
| 11 | John Irwin | 6'0" | N/A | G | Sr. | Larchmont, NY, U.S. | Mamaroneck HS |
| 21 | Eric "Sleepy" Floyd | 6'3" | 170 | G | So. | Gastonia, NC, U.S. | Hunter Huss HS |
| 24 | Lonnie Duren | 6'1" | N/A | G | Sr. | Washington, DC, U.S. | Augusta Military Academy (Fort Defiance, VA) |
| 25 | Al Dutch | 6'7" | 190 | F | Sr. | Washington, DC, U.S. | Archbishop Carroll HS |
| 30 | Ron Blaylock | 6'3" | N/A | G | So. | Winston-Salem, NC, U.S. | East Forsyth HS |
| 32 | Eric Smith | 6'5" | 185 | F | So. | Potomac, MD, U.S. | Winston Churchill HS |
| 33 | Craig "Big Sky" Shelton | 6'7" | 210 | F | Sr. | Washington, DC, U.S. | Dunbar HS |
| 34 | Terry Fenlon | 6'2" | N/A | G | Sr. | Washington, DC, U.S. | Mount St. Mary's University |
| 40 | Mike Hancock | 6'7" | 180 | F/C | So. | Washington, DC, U.S. | Roosevelt Senior HS |
| 41 | Jeff Bullis | 6'7" | N/A | F | So. | Forest Hill, MD, U.S. | Bel Air HS |
| 44 | John Duren | 6'3" | 150 | G | Sr. | Washington, DC, U.S. | Dunbar HS |
| 50 | Ed Spriggs | 6'9" | 240 | C/F | So. | North Brentwood, MD, U.S. | Northwestern HS |
| 51 | Mike Frazier | 6'7" | N/A | F | Jr. | Cleveland, OH, U.S. | University School |

== Rankings ==
Ranking movement Legend: ██ Improvement in ranking. ██ Decrease in ranking. ██ Not ranked the previous week. RV=Others receiving votes.
| Poll | Pre | Wk 1 | Wk 2 | Wk 3 | Wk 4 | Wk 5 | Wk 6 | Wk 7 | Wk 8 | Wk 9 | Wk 10 | Wk 11 | Wk 12 | Wk 13 | Final |
|---|---|---|---|---|---|---|---|---|---|---|---|---|---|---|---|
| AP | 19 | 17 | 16 | 17 | 17 | 18 | 20 | | | | | | | 20 | 11 |
| Coaches | | 16 | 16 | 17 | 13 | 20 | | | | | | | | | 10 |

== Schedule and results ==
Sources

- All times are Eastern

| Date time, TV | Rank^{#} | Opponent^{#} | Result | Record | Site (attendance) city, state |
Regular season
| Sat., Dec. 1, 1979* | No. 19 | Bowie State | W 98–63 | 1–0 | McDonough Gymnasium (3,901); Washington, DC |
| Wed., Dec. 5, 1979* | No. 19 | vs. Maryland | W 83–71 | 2–0 | D.C. Armory (6,905); Washington, DC |
| Sat., Dec. 8, 1979* | No. 17 | Saint Leo | W 117–68 | 3–0 | McDonough Gymnasium (N/A); Washington, DC |
| Tue., Dec. 11, 1979* | No. 18 | at No. 1 Indiana | L 69–76 | 3–1 | Assembly Hall (17,011); Bloomington, IN |
| Sat., Dec. 15, 1979* | No. 16 | vs. Loyola Marymount; Nike Cage Classic | W 69–64 | 4–1 | University Arena (5,221); Albuquerque, NM |
| Sun., Dec. 16, 1979* | No. 16 | vs. Houston; Nike Cage Classic | W 78–75 | 5–1 | University Arena (2,718); Albuquerque, NM |
| Tue., Dec. 18, 1979 | No. 17 | Providence | W 55–50 | 6–1 (1–0) | McDonough Gymnasium (4,418); Washington, DC |
| Sat., Dec. 22, 1979* | No. 17 | Northeastern | W 85–66 | 7–1 | McDonough Gymnasium (3,022); Washington, DC |
| Wed., Dec. 26, 1979* | No. 17 | vs. Boston College; ECAC Holiday Festival | L 74–75 ^{OT} | 7–2 | Madison Square Garden (10.466); New York, NY |
| Fri., Dec. 28, 1979* | No. 17 | vs. Lafayette; ECAC Holiday Festival | W 65–60 | 8–2 | Madison Square Garden (15,270); New York, NY |
| Thu., Jan. 3, 1980* | No. 18 | Drake | L 77−79 ^{2OT} | 8–3 | McDonough Gymnasium (N/A); Washington, DC |
| Sat., Jan. 5, 1980* | No. 20 | Iona | W 95–48 | 9−3 | McDonough Gymnasium (3,805); Washington, DC |
| Tue., Jan. 8, 1980* | No. 20 | at Saint Joseph's | W 62–53 | 10−3 | Palestra (6,253); Philadelphia, PA |
| Sat., Jan. 12, 1980* | No. 20 | at Oral Roberts | L 65–76 | 10–4 | Mabee Center (10,016); Tulsa, OK |
| Wed., Jan. 16, 1980* | | at Saint Peter's | W 64–49 | 11–4 | Yanitelli Center (N/A); Jersey City, NJ |
| Sat., Jan. 19, 1980 | | at No. 10 St. John's | L 69–71 | 11–5 (1–1) | McDonough Gymnasium (4,619); Queens, NY |
| Wed., Jan. 23, 1980* | | United States International | W 107–79 | 12–5 | McDonough Gymnasium (N/A); Washington, DC |
| Wed., Jan. 26, 1980* | | American | W 86–62 | 13–5 | McDonough Gymnasium (4,526); Washington, DC |
| Wed., Jan. 30, 1980; ESPN | | at Boston College | W 97–92 ^{OT} | 14–5 (2–1) | Roberts Center (4,200); Chestnut Hill, MA |
| Sat., Feb. 2, 1980 | | Connecticut; Rivalry | W 86–64 | 15–5 (3–1) | McDonough Gymnasium (4,502); Washington, DC |
| Wed., Feb. 6, 1980 | | at Seton Hall | W 81–67 | 16–5 (4–1) | Walsh Gymnasium (3,300); South Orange, NJ |
| Sat., Feb. 9, 1980* | | Wagner | W 89–75 | 17−5 | McDonough Gymnasium (3,909); Washington, DC |
| Wed., Feb. 13, 1980 | | at No. 2 Syracuse; Rivalry | W 52–50 | 18–5 (5–1) | Manley Field House (N/A); Syracuse, NY |
| Sat., Feb. 16, 1980* | | Detroit | W 88–83 | 19–5 | McDonough Gymnasium (N/A); Washington, DC |
| Wed., Feb. 20, 1980* | | George Washington | W 98–74 | 20–5 | McDonough Gymnasium (4,520); Washington, DC |
| Sat., Feb. 23, 1980* | | Holy Cross | W 105–73 | 21–5 | McDonough Gymnasium (4,523); Washington, DC |
Big East tournament
| Thu., Feb. 28, 1980 | (3) No. 20 | vs. (6) Seton Hall; Quarterfinals | W 60–47 | 22–5 | Providence Civic Center (6,814); Providence, RI |
| Fri., Feb. 29, 1980 | (3) No. 20 | vs. (2) No. 8 St. John's; Semifinals | W 76–66 | 23–5 | Providence Civic Center (11,223); Providence, RI |
| Sat., Mar. 1, 1980 | (3) No. 20 | vs. (1) No. 3 Syracuse; Championship/Rivalry | W 87–81 | 24–5 | Providence Civic Center (11,223); Providence, RI |
NCAA tournament
| Sat., Mar. 8, 1980 | (3 E) No. 11 | vs. (6 E) Iona; Second round | W 74–71 | 25–5 | Providence Civic Center (6,827); Providence, RI |
| Fri., Mar. 14, 1980 | (3 E) No. 11 | vs. (2 E) No. 8 Maryland; Sweet Sixteen | W 74–68 | 26–5 | Spectrum (17,569); Philadelphia, PA |
| Sun., Mar. 16, 1980 | (3 E) No. 11 | vs. (5 E) Iowa; Elite Eight | L 80–81 | 26–6 | Spectrum (15,981); Philadelphia, PA |
*Non-conference game. ^{#}Rankings from AP Poll. (#) Tournament seedings in parentheses.
