= Georgetown–Syracuse men's basketball rivalry =

American college basketball rivalry

- Georgetown Hoyas Syracuse Orange
- Sport: Men's basketball
- First meeting: February 15, 1930; Syracuse 40, Georgetown 18
- Latest meeting: December 14, 2024; Georgetown 75, Syracuse 71
- Next meeting: TBD

Statistics
- Total meetings: 99
- All-time series: Syracuse leads 53–46 (.535)
- Largest victory: Georgetown, 90–63 (1985)
- Longest win streak: 6 (Georgetown 1987–1989; Syracuse 1996–2000)
- Current win streak: Georgetown, 1 (2024–present)

Locations of Georgetown and Syracuse

The Georgetown–Syracuse men's basketball rivalry is an American college basketball rivalry between the Georgetown Hoyas men's basketball team of Georgetown University and the Syracuse Orange men's basketball team of Syracuse University. Syracuse leads the all-time series 53–46.

== History ==
The first game played between the two schools took place on February 15, 1930, in Syracuse, New York. Syracuse won 40–18. The schools played 16 games against one another through 1979 without a rivalry developing between them, although the final game in this era was a meeting in the 1979 ECAC South-Upstate Region Tournament final, in which No. 16 Georgetown upset No. 6 Syracuse to secure an automatic bid to the 1979 NCAA Tournament.

Both schools became charter members of the original Big East Conference for its inaugural season in 1979–1980. The rivalry began that season when Georgetown visited No. 3-ranked Syracuse on February 13, 1980, for the last game Syracuse was to play at Manley Field House before moving into the new Carrier Dome for its home games. The odds-on favorite with a 57-game home winning streak at Manley, Syracuse expected to virtually clinch the first Big East regular-season championship by closing Manley with one final victory, and held a 14-point lead over the Hoyas at halftime, but Georgetown came back in the second half for a 52–50 upset win. In his post-game press conference, Georgetown head coach John Thompson, Jr., exulted, "Manley Field House is officially closed." That quote, combined with Georgetown's upset victory on an historic evening in Syracuse basketball, is credited as the beginning of the great Georgetown-Syracuse rivalry that would be one of the defining features of the original Big East Conference for the rest of its 34-year existence.

During their membership in the original Big East, Georgetown and Syracuse played each other 73 times. Many of the most iconic moments in the history of the rivalry occurred during the 1980s and 1990s. In perhaps the ugliest incident of the era, a fan threw an orange at Georgetown center Patrick Ewing — the subject of many racist taunts by opposing Big East fans during the 1982–83 season — while he was attempting a free throw during a game at a sold-out Carrier Dome on January 10, 1983, narrowly missing him and prompting Syracuse head coach Jim Boeheim to grab a microphone and tell the crowd that he would pull his team off the court and forfeit the game to Georgetown if such behavior continued; he did not have to, but Georgetown won the game, 97–92.

In July 2012, Syracuse announced that it would leave the original Big East to move to the Atlantic Coast Conference in 2013 after a final season in the Big East in 2012–2013. Georgetown also opted to leave the original Big East after the 2012–2013 season to join a new Big East Conference. (Note: The original Big East Conference became the American Athletic Conference, marketed as "The American," beginning with the 2013–2014 season) The changes meant that the two schools would no longer play in the same conference beginning with the 2013–2014 season.

After a two-season hiatus, Georgetown and Syracuse resumed play as non-conference rivals in the 2015–2016 season, meeting in one game a season from 2015 through 2024, with Georgetown and Syracuse alternating as hosts. Georgetown won the schools' most recent meeting, a 75–71 victory on December 14, 2024. The two schools have scheduled no future meetings.

== Game results ==
Georgetown victories	Syracuse victories

No.	Date	Location	Winner	Score		Series	Notes
No.	Date	Location	Winner	GU	SU	Series	Notes
1	February 15, 1930	Syracuse, NY	Syracuse	18	40	Syracuse 1–0	Non-conference
2	February 13, 1937	Syracuse, NY	Georgetown	45	36	Tied 1–1	Non-conference
3	January 29, 1938	Syracuse, NY	Syracuse	26	43	Syracuse 2–1	Non-conference
4	January 28, 1939	Syracuse, NY	Syracuse	43	45	Syracuse 3–1	Non-conference
5	February 1, 1940	Syracuse, NY	Syracuse	33	38	Syracuse 4–1	Non-conference
6	February 5, 1941	Syracuse, NY	Syracuse	43	49	Syracuse 5–1	Non-conference
7	February 1, 1943	Washington, DC	Georgetown	65	38	Syracuse 5–2	Non-conference
8	March 4, 1943	Syracuse, NY	Georgetown	47	46	Syracuse 5–3	Non-conference
9	January 31, 1958	Syracuse, NY	Syracuse	46	62	Syracuse 6–3	Non-conference
10	February 4, 1959	Washington, DC	Georgetown	85	70	Syracuse 6–4	Non-conference
11	February 2, 1963	Syracuse, NY	Syracuse	70	76	Syracuse 7–4	Non-conference
12	February 6, 1965	Washington, DC	Syracuse	69	95	Syracuse 8–4	Non-conference
13	February 18, 1967	Syracuse, NY	Syracuse	95	108	Syracuse 9–4	Non-conference
14	December 12, 1967	Washington, DC	Syracuse	78	95	Syracuse 10–4	Non-conference
15	December 27, 1974	Rochester, NY	Georgetown	71	70	Syracuse 10–5	Non-conference; Kodak Classic Semifinal
16	March 5, 1979	College Park, MD	Georgetown	66	58	Syracuse 10–6	Non-conference; ECAC South-Upstate Region Tournament Final
17	February 13, 1980	Syracuse, NY	Georgetown	52	50	Syracuse 10–7	First meeting in the original Big East Conference
18	March 1, 1980	Providence, RI	Georgetown	87	81	Syracuse 10–8	1980 Big East Tournament
19	January 17, 1981	Washington, DC	Georgetown	62	57	Syracuse 10–9	N/A
20	February 9, 1981	Syracuse, NY	Syracuse	64	66	Syracuse 11–9	N/A
21	March 6, 1981	Syracuse, NY	Syracuse	53	67	Syracuse 12–9	1981 Big East Tournament
22	January 17, 1982	Syracuse, NY	Syracuse	70	75	Syracuse 13–9	N/A
23	February 8, 1982	Landover, MD	Georgetown	96	79	Syracuse 13–10	N/A
24	January 10, 1983	Syracuse, NY	Georgetown	97	92	Syracuse 13–11	N/A
25	March 7, 1983	Landover, MD	Georgetown	80	75	Syracuse 13–12	N/A
26	March 10, 1983	New York, NY	Syracuse	72	79	Syracuse 14–12	1983 Big East Tournament
27	January 30, 1984	Syracuse, NY	Georgetown	80	67	Syracuse 14–13	N/A
28	March 3, 1984	Landover, MD	Georgetown	88	71	Tied 14–14	N/A
29	March 10, 1984	New York, NY	Georgetown	82	71	Georgetown 15–14	1984 Big East Tournament
30	January 28, 1985	Syracuse, NY	Syracuse	63	65	Tied 15–15	N/A
31	March 3, 1985	Landover, MD	Georgetown	90	63	Georgetown 16–15	N/A
32	March 9, 1985	New York, NY	Georgetown	74	65	Georgetown 17–15	1985 Big East Tournament
33	January 15, 1986	Landover, MD	Georgetown	73	70	Georgetown 18–15	N/A
34	February 23, 1986	Syracuse, NY	Syracuse	63	64	Georgetown 18–16	N/A
35	March 6, 1986	New York, NY	Syracuse	73	75	Georgetown 18–17	1986 Big East Tournament
36	January 31, 1987	Landover, MD	Georgetown	83	81	Georgetown 19–17	N/A
37	February 22, 1987	Syracuse, NY	Georgetown	72	71	Georgetown 20–17	N/A
38	March 8, 1987	New York, NY	Georgetown	69	59	Georgetown 21–17	1987 Big East Tournament
39	January 24, 1988	Syracuse, NY	Georgetown	69	68	Georgetown 22–17	N/A
40	February 13, 1988	Landover, MD	Georgetown	71	69	Georgetown 23–17	N/A
41	February 13, 1989	Landover, MD	Georgetown	61	54	Georgetown 24–17	N/A
42	March 5, 1989	Syracuse, NY	Syracuse	76	82	Georgetown 24–18	N/A
43	March 12, 1989	New York, NY	Georgetown	88	79	Georgetown 25–18	1989 Big East Tournament
44	January 27, 1990	Landover, MD	Syracuse	76	95	Georgetown 25–19	N/A
45	March 4, 1990	Syracuse, NY	Syracuse	87	89	Georgetown 25–20	N/A
46	January 21, 1991	Landover, MD	Syracuse	56	58	Georgetown 25–21	N/A
47	March 3, 1991	Syracuse, NY	Syracuse	58	62	Georgetown 25–22	N/A
48	January 15, 1992	Landover, MD	Syracuse	62	74	Georgetown 25–23	N/A
49	February 23, 1992	Syracuse, NY	Georgetown	72	68	Georgetown 26–23	N/A
50	March 15, 1992	New York, NY	Syracuse	54	56	Georgetown 26–24	1992 Big East Tournament
51	January 5, 1993	Landover, MD	Georgetown	64	60	Georgetown 27–24	N/A
52	February 8, 1993	Syracuse, NY	Syracuse	61	76	Georgetown 27–25	N/A
53	February 7, 1994	Landover, MD	Georgetown	60	56	Georgetown 28–25	N/A
54	March 6, 1994	Syracuse, NY	Syracuse	75	81	Georgetown 28–26	N/A
55	January 30, 1995	Landover, MD	Syracuse	75	76	Georgetown 28–27	N/A
56	February 26, 1995	Syracuse, NY	Georgetown	81	78	Georgetown 29–27	N/A
57	January 24, 1996	Landover, MD	Georgetown	83	64	Georgetown 30–27	N/A
58	February 10, 1996	Syracuse, NY	Syracuse	64	85	Georgetown 30–28	N/A
59	February 8, 1997	Syracuse, NY	Syracuse	74	77	Georgetown 30–29	N/A
60	January 26, 1998	Washington, DC	Syracuse	66	84	Tied 30–30	N/A
61	March 1, 1998	Syracuse, NY	Syracuse	72	77	Syracuse 31–30	N/A
62	January 16, 1999	Washington, DC	Syracuse	79	81	Syracuse 32–30	N/A
63	February 27, 2000	Syracuse, NY	Syracuse	52	67	Syracuse 33–30	N/A
64	March 9, 2000	New York, NY	Georgetown	76	72	Syracuse 33–31	2000 Big East Tournament
65	January 29, 2001	Syracuse, NY	Syracuse	63	70	Syracuse 34–31	N/A
66	February 24, 2001	Washington, DC	Georgetown	72	61	Syracuse 34–32	N/A
67	January 28, 2002	Washington, DC	Georgetown	75	60	Syracuse 34–33	N/A
68	February 24, 2002	Syracuse, NY	Georgetown	75	69	Tied 34–34	N/A
69	February 3, 2003	Syracuse, NY	Syracuse	80	88	Syracuse 35–34	N/A
70	March 3, 2003	Washington, DC	Syracuse	84	93	Syracuse 36–34	N/A
71	March 13, 2003	New York, NY	Syracuse	69	74	Syracuse 37–34	2003 Big East Tournament
72	February 21, 2004	Washington, DC	Syracuse	54	57	Syracuse 38–34	
73	January 18, 2005	Syracuse, NY	Syracuse	73	78	Syracuse 39–34	
74	February 25, 2006	Washington, DC	Georgetown	68	53	Syracuse 39–35	
75	March 10, 2006	New York, NY	Syracuse	57	58	Syracuse 40–35	2006 Big East Tournament
76	February 26, 2007	Syracuse, NY	Syracuse	58	72	Syracuse 41–35	N/A
77	January 21, 2008	Washington, DC	Georgetown	64	62	Syracuse 41–36	N/A
78	February 16, 2008	Syracuse, NY	Syracuse	70	77	Syracuse 42–36	N/A
79	January 14, 2009	Washington, DC	Georgetown	88	74	Syracuse 42–37	N/A
80	February 14, 2009	Syracuse, NY	Syracuse	94	98	Syracuse 43–37	N/A
81	January 25, 2010	Syracuse, NY	Syracuse	56	73	Syracuse 44–37	N/A
82	February 18, 2010	Washington, DC	Syracuse	71	75	Syracuse 45–37	N/A
83	March 11, 2010	New York, NY	Georgetown	91	84	Syracuse 45–38	N/A
84	February 9, 2011	Syracuse, NY	Georgetown	64	56	Syracuse 45–39	N/A
85	February 26, 2011	Washington, DC	Syracuse	51	58	Syracuse 46–39	N/A
86	February 8, 2012	Syracuse, NY	Syracuse	61	64	Syracuse 47–39	N/A
87	February 23, 2013	Syracuse, NY	Georgetown	57	46	Syracuse 47–40	N/A
88	March 9, 2013	Washington, DC	Georgetown	61	39	Syracuse 47–41	N/A
89	March 15, 2013	New York, NY	Syracuse	55	58	Syracuse 48–41	2013 Big East Tournament; Final meeting in the original Big East Conference
90	December 5, 2015	Washington, DC	Georgetown	79	72	Syracuse 48–42	Non-conference
91	December 17, 2016	Syracuse, NY	Georgetown	78	71	Syracuse 48–43	Non-conference
92	December 16, 2017	Syracuse, NY	Syracuse	79	86	Syracuse 49–43	Non-conference
93	December 8, 2018	Syracuse, NY	Syracuse	71	72	Syracuse 50–43	Non-conference
94	December 14, 2019	Washington, DC	Georgetown	89	79	Syracuse 50–44	Non-conference
95	January 9, 2021	Syracuse, NY	Syracuse	69	74	Syracuse 51–44	Non-conference
96	December 11, 2021	Washington, DC	Georgetown	79	75	Syracuse 51–45	Non-conference
97	December 10, 2022	Syracuse, NY	Syracuse	64	83	Syracuse 52–45	Non-conference
98	December 9, 2023	Washington, DC	Syracuse	68	80	Syracuse 53–45	Non-conference
99	December 14, 2024	Syracuse, NY	Georgetown	75	71	Syracuse 53–46	Non-conference
