= Roosevelt Bouie =

American basketball player (born 1958)

Personal information
- Born: January 21, 1958 (age 68) Kendall, New York, U.S.
- Listed height: 6 ft 11 in (2.11 m)
- Listed weight: 225 lb (102 kg)

Career information
- High school: Kendall (Kendall, New York)
- College: Syracuse (1976–1980)
- NBA draft: 1980: 2nd round, 34th overall pick
- Drafted by: Dallas Mavericks
- Playing career: 1980–1993
- Position: Center

Career history
- 1980–1982: Scavolini Pesaro
- 1982–1989: Cantine Riunite Reggio Emilia
- 1989–1991: Cantù
- 1991–1992: Coren Ourense
- 1992–1993: Medinform Marsala

Career highlights
- 3× Lega Serie A All-Star (1983, 1984, 1987); Second-team All-American – USBWA (1980); Third-team All-American – NABC, UPI (1980); First-team All-Big East (1980); No. 50 retired by Syracuse Orange
- Stats at Basketball Reference

Roosevelt Bouie (born January 21, 1958) is an American former basketball player. He is known both for his All-American college years at Syracuse University and his storied career in Italy's top league.

Bouie played for coach Jim Boeheim at Syracuse from 1976 to 1980, combining with teammate Louis Orr to form what became popularly known as the "Louie and Bouie Show." The duo was named so after the student newspaper The Daily Orange ran a caricature of them heading up the basketball court in tuxedos and top hats. A 6'11" center, Bouie was drafted in the second round of the 1980 NBA draft by the Dallas Mavericks. Bouie never played in the NBA, however, opting instead for a career in Italy where he averaged 16.3 points and 10.5 rebounds per game over 12 seasons. Bouie also played one season in Spain for Ourense.

He was general manager for the Buffalo Stampede of the Premier Basketball League from 2009 to 2010.
