= 1976–77 Georgetown Hoyas men's basketball team =

American college basketball season

1976–77 Georgetown Hoyas men's basketball

National Invitation Tournament, First Round
- Conference: Independent
- Record: 19–9
- Head coach: John Thompson (5th season)
- Assistant coach: Bill Stein (5th season)
- Captains: Larry Long; Mike MacDermott
- Home arena: McDonough Gymnasium

1976–77 NCAA Division I men's basketball independents standings
	Conf.				Overall
Team	W		L	PCT	W		L	PCT
No. 4 UNLV		–		–	29	–	3	.906
Indiana State		–		–	25	–	3	.893
No. 6 Syracuse		–		–	26	–	4	.867
No. 12 Detroit		–		–	25	–	4	.862
Old Dominion		–		–	25	–	4	.862
Providence		–		–	24	–	5	.828
Holy Cross		–		–	23	–	6	.793
St. Bonaventure		–		–	23	–	6	.793
No. 7 Marquette		–		–	25	–	7	.781
North Texas State		–		–	21	–	6	.778
Illinois State		–		–	22	–	7	.759
No. 10 Notre Dame		–		–	22	–	7	.759
Creighton		–		–	21	–	7	.750
Oral Roberts		–		–	21	–	7	.750
Army		–		–	20	–	8	.714
St. John's		–		–	22	–	9	.710
Milwaukee		–		–	19	–	8	.704
Georgetown		–		–	19	–	9	.679
Virginia Tech		–		–	19	–	10	.655
James Madison		–		–	17	–	9	.654
Northwestern State		–		–	17	–	9	.654
Texas–Pan American		–		–	17	–	9	.654
Connecticut		–		–	17	–	10	.630
Seton Hall		–		–	18	–	11	.621
UNC Wilmington		–		–	16	–	10	.615
Portland State		–		–	16	–	10	.615
Iona		–		–	15	–	10	.600
Dayton		–		–	16	–	11	.593
Fairfield		–		–	16	–	11	.593
Georgia Southern		–		–	16	–	11	.593
Richmond		–		–	15	–	11	.577
Saint Francis (PA)		–		–	15	–	11	.577
DePaul		–		–	15	–	12	.556
Northeast Louisiana		–		–	15	–	12	.556
Stetson		–		–	15	–	12	.556
Utah State		–		–	15	–	12	.556
Colgate		–		–	13	–	11	.542
Navy		–		–	13	–	11	.542
Oklahoma City		–		–	14	–	12	.538
South Carolina		–		–	14	–	12	.538
Valparaiso		–		–	13	–	12	.520
Catholic		–		–	13	–	13	.500
Fairleigh Dickinson		–		–	13	–	13	.500
Loyola (IL)		–		–	13	–	13	.500
Maine		–		–	13	–	13	.500
Niagara		–		–	13	–	13	.500
Rhode Island		–		–	13	–	13	.500
Saint Peter's		–		–	13	–	13	.500
VCU		–		–	13	–	13	.500
Butler		–		–	13	–	14	.481
Manhattan		–		–	13	–	14	.481
New Hampshire		–		–	12	–	14	.462
Northeastern		–		–	12	–	14	.462
St. Francis (NY)		–		–	12	–	14	.462
Air Force		–		–	12	–	15	.444
Denver		–		–	12	–	15	.444
Southern Mississippi		–		–	11	–	16	.407
Siena		–		–	9	–	15	.375
Cleveland State		–		–	10	–	17	.370
Xavier		–		–	10	–	17	.370
Centenary (LA)		–		–	11	–	19	.367
Long Island		–		–	9	–	16	.360
Hawaii		–		–	9	–	18	.333
Western Carolina		–		–	8	–	16	.333
Vermont		–		–	8	–	17	.320
Boston College		–		–	8	–	18	.308
Baptist		–		–	8	–	19	.296
Marshall		–		–	8	–	19	.296
Boston University		–		–	7	–	19	.269
Robert Morris		–		–	7	–	19	.269
Samford		–		–	7	–	19	.269
Mercer		–		–	6	–	19	.240
Hardin–Simmons		–		–	6	–	21	.222
Houston Baptist		–		–	6	–	23	.207
Buffalo		–		–	5	–	21	.192
Fordham		–		–	5	–	21	.192
Wagner		–		–	3	–	21	.125
Canisius		–		–	3	–	22	.120
Rankings from AP Poll

The 1976–77 Georgetown Hoyas men's basketball team represented Georgetown University during the 1976–77 NCAA Division I college basketball season. John Thompson, coached them in his fifth season as head coach. An independent, Georgetown played its home games at McDonough Gymnasium on the Georgetown campus in Washington, D.C., and finished the season with a record of 19–9. Knocked out of the ECAC South Region tournament for the first time in the semifinals, the team missed an NCAA tournament bid for the first time since 1974. The Hoyas instead appeared in the 1977 National Invitation Tournament (NIT), their first NIT appearance since 1970, and lost in the first round to Virginia Tech.

== Season recap ==
Junior guard and perennial high scorer Derrick Jackson shot 198-for-404 (49.0%) from the field during the season and scored 400 points, virtually duplicating his performance from the previous season, when he had shot 195-for-399 (48.9%) from the field and scored 406 points. This season, he scored in double figures in 27 of 28 games and finished first in five scoring categories for the team.

Promising freshman forward Craig "Big Sky" Shelton missed all but seven games because of a knee injury and would not emerge as one of the team's stars until the following season. His high school teammate, freshman guard John Duren, however, became a starter by mid-season and showed his talent as a point guard and shooter. His ability to lead the team as point guard and pass the ball contributed to Georgetown's team shooting percentage rising from 46% to 50% during the year. He scored a season-high 19 points against Boston College and averaged 15 points per game after becoming a starter.

With the arrival of Duren, there was little need for sophomore Steve Martin to play as a guard – his position in high school and during his freshman year – so Thompson played him off the bench as a small forward this season. Martin made the most of the transition, scoring 15 against Purdue, 17 against Pennsylvania, and a season-high 20 against Seton Hall. He also came off the bench for an eight-point, six-steal game against Holy Cross.

Although retaining its status as an independent, Georgetown was in its third season as a member of the Eastern College Athletic Conference (ECAC), a loosely organized sports federation that held three regional post-season Division I basketball tournaments in 1977 for independent Eastern colleges and universities similar to the end-of-season conference tournaments held by conventional college basketball conferences, with each tournament winner receiving an at-large bid to the 1977 NCAA Division I men's basketball tournament. The Hoyas participated in the ECAC South Region tournament, which they had won in 1975 and 1976, facing Old Dominion in the semifinal. Junior Georgetown center Ed Hopkins, a key defensive presence also making a major offensive contribution by averaging 10.2 points and 8.4 rebounds per game and leading the team in shooting percentage from the field at 57%, missed the game because of an ankle injury. The Hoyas struggled without Hopkins and lost to Old Dominion 80–58. They therefore missed an NCAA tournament berth for the first time since the 1973–74 season.

Invited to the 1977 National Invitation Tournament instead, the Hoyas faced Virginia Tech in the first round. Sophomore forward Al Dutch, averaging 13.3 points and 7.8 rebounds per game for the season, had to sit out the game with an ankle injury. Georgetown missed Dutch's scoring and lost to the Hokies 83–79 despite Derrick Jackson's 28-point performance, which tied his career-high 28 points scored against Penn State during the 1975–76 season. Senior forward Larry Long, often limited by injuries during his four years with the Hoyas, put in an impressive performance in the last two collegiate games of his career with a combined 28 rebounds in the Old Dominion and Virginia Tech games.

== Roster ==
Junior guard Craig Esherick would later serve as an assistant coach for the Hoyas from 1982 to 1999 and as head coach from 1999 to 2004. Junior guard Mike Riley would later serve as a Hoya assistant coach from 1982 to 2004.

#	Name	Height	Weight (lbs.)	Position	Class	Hometown	Previous team(s)
10	Craig Esherick	6'3"	N/A	G	Jr.	Silver Spring, MD, U.S.	Springbrook HS
12	Mike Riley	5'8"	N/A	G	Jr.	Washington, DC, U.S.	United States Navy
20	Steve Martin	6'4"	175	F	So.	New Orleans, LA, U.S.	St. Augustine HS
22	Derrick Jackson	6'0"	180	G	Jr.	Wheaton, IL, U.S.	Wheaton Central HS
24	Lonnie Duren	6'1"	N/A	G	Fr.	Washington, DC, U.S.	Augusta Military Academy (Fort Defiance, VA)
25	Al Dutch	6'7"	190	F	So.	Washington, DC, U.S.	Archbishop Carroll HS
32	Larry Long	6'7"	200	F	Sr.	Washington, DC, U.S.	Mackin HS
33	Gary Wilson	6'7"	N/A	C	So.	Washington, DC, U.S.	St. Anthony's HS
34	Mike MacDermott	6'4"	N/A	G	Sr.	Saratoga Springs, NY, U.S.	St. Peter HS
42	Felix Yeoman	6'7"	N/A	F/C	Jr.	Washington, DC, U.S.	St. Anthony's HS
44	John Duren	6'3"	150	G	Fr.	Washington, DC, U.S.	Dunbar HS
50	Craig "Big Sky" Shelton	6'7"	210	F	So.	Washington, DC, U.S.	Dunbar HS
51	Mike Frazier	6'7"	N/A	F	Fr.	Cleveland, OH, U.S.	University School
52	Ed Hopkins	6'9"	225	C	Jr.	Baltimore, MD, U.S.	Edmondson-Westside HS
55	Tom Scates	6'11"	N/A	C	So.	Alexandria, VA, U.S.	St. Anthony's HS, (Washington, DC)

== Rankings ==
The team was not ranked in the Top 20 of the Associated Press Poll at any time, but it was ranked in the Top 20 in the Coaches' Poll during two weeks. This was only the second national ranking in Georgetown men's basketball history, and the first since the 1952-53 team spent a week at No. 20 in the AP Poll in January 1953.

Ranking movement Legend: ██ Improvement in ranking. ██ Decrease in ranking. ██ Not ranked the previous week. RV=Others receiving votes.
Poll	Wk 1	Wk 2	Wk 3	Wk 4	Wk 5	Wk 6	Wk 7	Wk 8	Wk 9	Wk 10	Wk 11	Wk 12	Wk 13	Wk 14	Wk 15	Wk 16	Final
AP																	
Coaches	17			20													

== 1976–77 schedule and results ==
Sources

- All times are Eastern

Date time, TV	Rank^{#}	Opponent^{#}	Result	Record	Site city, state
Regular season
Tue., Nov. 30, 1976 no, no		Upsala	W 66–46	1-0	McDonough Gymnasium; Washington, DC
Sat., Dec. 4, 1976 no, no		St. Bonaventure	W 76–60	2-0	McDonough Gymnasium; Washington, DC
Tue., Dec. 7, 1976 no, no		North Carolina Central	W 95–69	3-0	McDonough Gymnasium; Washington, DC
Sat., Dec. 18, 1976 no, no		Chicago State	W 106–65	4-0	McDonough Gymnasium; Washington, DC
Wed., Dec. 22, 1976 no, no		vs. No. 5 Alabama; Carolina Classic	L 64–66	4-1	Carolina Coliseum; Columbia, SC
Thu., Dec. 23, 1976 no, no		vs. Harvard; Carolina Classic	W 60–40	5-1	Carolina Coliseum; Columbia, SC
Mon., Dec. 27, 1976 no, no		vs. Fairfield; ECAC Holiday Festival	W 79–69	6-1	Madison Square Garden; New York, NY
Tue., Dec. 28, 1976 no, no		vs. Purdue; ECAC Holiday Festival	L 65–83	6-2	Madison Square Garden; New York, NY
Thu., Dec. 30, 1976 no, no		vs. Pennsylvania; ECAC Holiday Festival	W 66–61	7-2	Madison Square Garden; New York, NY
Tue., Jan. 4, 1977 no, no		Boston University	W 53–49	8-2	McDonough Gymnasium; Washington, DC
Sat., Jan. 8, 1977 no, no		Stonehill	W 81–57	9-2	McDonough Gymnasium; Washington, DC
Wed., Jan. 12, 1977 no, no		at Navy	L 55–56	9-3	Halsey Field House; Annapolis, MD
Sat., Jan. 15, 1977 no, no		Iona	W 81–67	10-3	McDonough Gymnasium; Washington, DC
Tue., Jan. 18, 1977 no, no		at Holy Cross	W 69–65	11-3	Hart Center; Worcester, MA
Sat., Jan. 22, 1977 no, no		Seton Hall	L 82–94	11-4	McDonough Gymnasium; Washington, DC
Wed., Jan. 26, 1977 no, no		St. Joseph's	W 76–64	12-4	McDonough Gymnasium; Washington, DC
Sat., Jan. 29, 1977 no, no		at American	W 78–64	13-4	Fort Myer Gymnasium; Fort Myer, VA
Wed., Feb. 2, 1977 no, no		at St. John's	L 66–82	13-5	Alumni Hall; Queens, NY
Sat., Feb. 5, 1977 no, no		Loyola (Illinois)	W 80–70	14-5	McDonough Gymnasium; Washington, DC
Thu., Feb. 10, 1977 no, no		Fordham	W 66–47	15-5	McDonough Gymnasium; Washington, DC
Sat., Feb. 12, 1977 no, no		Southern Connecticut State	W 95–65	16-5	McDonough Gymnasium; Washington, DC
Tue., Feb. 15, 1977 no, no		at St. Peter's	W 73–71 ^{OT}	17-5	Yanitelli Center; Jersey City, NJ
Sat., Feb. 19, 1977 no, no		Boston College	W 87–69	18-5	McDonough Gymnasium; Washington, DC
Wed., Feb. 23, 1977 no, no		at George Washington	L 71–72	18-6	Charles E. Smith Athletic Center; Washington, DC
Sat., Feb. 26, 1977 no, no		Manhattan	W 79–71	19-6	McDonough Gymnasium; Washington, DC
Wed., Mar. 2, 1977 no, no		at Saint Francis	L 87–94	19-7	Physical Education Center; Loretto, PA
ECAC South Region tournament
Fri., Mar. 4, 1977 no, no		Old Dominion; Semifinal	L 58–80	19-8	McDonough Gymnasium; Washington, DC
National Invitation tournament
Fri., Mar. 11, 1977 no, no		at Virginia Tech; First Round	L 79–83	19-9	Cassell Coliseum; Blacksburg, VA
*Non-conference game. ^{#}Rankings from AP Poll. (#) Tournament seedings in parentheses.
