= Reggie Carter =

American basketball player (1957–1999)

Personal information
- Born: October 10, 1957 New York City, New York, U.S.
- Died: December 24, 1999 (aged 42) Huntington Station, New York, U.S.
- Listed height: 6 ft 3 in (1.91 m)
- Listed weight: 175 lb (79 kg)

Career information
- High school: Long Island Lutheran (Brookville, New York)
- College: Hawaii (1975–1976); St. John's (1977–1980)
- NBA draft: 1979: 2nd round, 27th overall pick
- Drafted by: New York Knicks
- Playing career: 1980–1982
- Position: Shooting guard
- Number: 35

Career history
- 1980–1982: New York Knicks

Career highlights
- Second-team All-American – AP, UPI (1980); First-team All-Big East (1980); Second-team Parade All-American (1975)
- Stats at NBA.com
- Stats at Basketball Reference

Reginald Carter (October 10, 1957 – December 24, 1999) was an American professional basketball player. At 6 ft 3 in (1.91 m) and 175 pounds (79 kg), he played as a shooting guard. Born in New York City, Carter played college basketball for the Hawaii Rainbow Warriors and St. John's Red Storm after spending his schoolboy years starring for Long Island Lutheran High School in Brookville, New York. Carter was selected by the National Basketball Association's New York Knicks in the second round (27th pick overall) of the 1979 NBA draft. He played with the Knicks from 1980 to 1982 in a total of 135 games. Carter became an assistant principal at Mineola High School before dying of a rare disease likened to tuberculosis.

== Career statistics ==
Legend
GP	Games played	GS	Games started	MPG	Minutes per game
FG%	Field goal percentage	3P%	3-point field goal percentage	FT%	Free throw percentage
RPG	Rebounds per game	APG	Assists per game	SPG	Steals per game
BPG	Blocks per game	PPG	Points per game	**Bold**	Career high

=== NBA ===
==== Regular season ====
Year	Team	GP	GS	MPG	FG%	3P%	FT%	RPG	APG	SPG	BPG	PPG
1980–81	New York	60		8.9	.330	.000	.739	1.2	1.3	.4	.0	2.8
1981–82	New York	**75**	1	**12.3**	**.425**	–	**.800**	**1.3**	**1.7**	**.5**	**.1**	**4.0**
Career		135	1	10.8	.388	.000	.772	1.2	1.5	.4	.1	3.5

==== Playoffs ====
Year	Team	GP	MPG	FG%	3P%	FT%	RPG	APG	SPG	BPG	PPG
1981	New York	1	7.0	.000	–	–	2.0	.0	.0	.0	.0
