= Craig Shelton =

American basketball player (born 1957)

Personal information
- Born: May 1, 1957 (age 69) Washington, D.C., U.S.
- Listed height: 6 ft 7 in (2.01 m)
- Listed weight: 210 lb (95 kg)

Career information
- High school: Dunbar (Washington, D.C.)
- College: Georgetown (1976–1980)
- NBA draft: 1980: 2nd round, 28th overall pick
- Drafted by: Atlanta Hawks
- Playing career: 1980–1986
- Position: Small forward
- Number: 11

Career history
- 1980–1981: Atlanta Hawks
- 1981–1982: Atlantic City Hi-Rollers
- 1982: Lancaster Lightning
- 1982–1983: Libertas Forlì
- 1983–1985: Basket Mestre
- 1985–1986: Pallacanestro Trieste

Career highlights
- First-team All-Big East (1980)

Career NBA statistics
- Points: 240 (4.1 ppg)
- Rebounds: 141 (2.4 rpg)
- Assists: 27 (0.5 apg)
- Stats at NBA.com
- Stats at Basketball Reference

Craig Anthony Shelton (born May 1, 1957) is an American former basketball player. He played in parts of two seasons in the National Basketball Association (NBA).

Shelton, a 6-foot-7-inch (201 cm) small forward from Dunbar High School in Washington, D.C., played college basketball with his high school teammate John Duren at Georgetown University from 1976 to 1980. Shelton scored 1,409 points (15.2 per game) and collected 691 rebounds (7.4 per game) during his college career. During his senior year, he was chosen for the 1979–80 All-Big East First Team and was the Most Valuable Player of the 1980 Big East tournament.

After the close of his college career, Shelton was drafted in the second round of the 1980 NBA draft by the Atlanta Hawks (28th overall). He played for the Hawks during the 1980–81 NBA season and in four games of the 1981–82 season before being waived. He played the remainder of the season in the Continental Basketball Association (CBA) for the Atlantic City Hi-Rollers and Lancaster Lightning. He then played professionally in Italy from 1982 to 1986.

== Career statistics ==
Legend
GP	Games played	GS	Games started	MPG	Minutes per game
FG%	Field goal percentage	3P%	3-point field goal percentage	FT%	Free throw percentage
RPG	Rebounds per game	APG	Assists per game	SPG	Steals per game
BPG	Blocks per game	PPG	Points per game	**Bold**	Career high

=== NBA ===
==== Regular season ====
Year	Team	GP	GS	MPG	FG%	3P%	FT%	RPG	APG	SPG	BPG	PPG
1980–81	Atlanta	**55**		**10.7**	**.457**	.000	**.603**	**2.5**	**.5**	**.3**	**.1**	**4.3**
1981–82	Atlanta	4	0	5.3	.333	–	.500	.8	.0	**.3**	.0	1.3
Career		59	0	10.3	.453	.000	.600	2.4	.5	.3	.1	4.1

== See also ==
- 1976–77 Georgetown Hoyas men's basketball team
- 1977–78 Georgetown Hoyas men's basketball team
- 1978–79 Georgetown Hoyas men's basketball team
- 1979–80 Georgetown Hoyas men's basketball team
