= John Duren =

American basketball player (born 1958)

Personal information
- Born: October 30, 1958 (age 68) Washington, D.C., U.S.
- Listed height: 6 ft 3 in (1.91 m)
- Listed weight: 195 lb (88 kg)

Career information
- High school: Dunbar (Washington, D.C.)
- College: Georgetown (1976–1980)
- NBA draft: 1980: 1st round, 19th overall pick
- Drafted by: Utah Jazz
- Playing career: 1980–1983
- Position: Point guard
- Number: 18, 44

Career history
- 1980–1982: Utah Jazz
- 1982–1983: Indiana Pacers
- 1983–1984: Lancaster Lightning

Career highlights
- Big East Player of the Year (1980); First-team All-Big East (1980)
- Stats at NBA.com
- Stats at Basketball Reference
Medals
Representing United States
Men's basketball
Pan American Games
Gold medal – first place	1979 San Juan	Team competition

John Thomas Duren (born October 30, 1958) is an American former professional basketball player. A 6-foot-3-inch (191 cm) point guard from Dunbar High School in Washington, D.C., he played college basketball with his high school teammate Craig Shelton at Georgetown University from 1976 to 1980. He was a gold medalist as a member of the United States basketball team at the 1979 Pan American Games. During his senior year, he was chosen for the 1979–80 All-Big East First Team and was the Big East Conference Player of the Year.

Duren was selected with the 19th overall pick in the 1980 NBA draft by the Utah Jazz. He played for the Jazz for two seasons before signing as a free agent with the Indiana Pacers for 1982–83, his final NBA season. His final professional season was in 1983–84 with the Lancaster Lightning of the Continental Basketball Association.

== Career statistics ==
Legend
GP	Games played	GS	Games started	MPG	Minutes per game
FG%	Field goal percentage	3P%	3-point field goal percentage	FT%	Free throw percentage
RPG	Rebounds per game	APG	Assists per game	SPG	Steals per game
BPG	Blocks per game	PPG	Points per game	**Bold**	Career high

=== NBA ===
==== Regular season ====
Year	Team	GP	GS	MPG	FG%	3P%	FT%	RPG	APG	SPG	BPG	PPG
1980–81	Utah	40		11.5	.327	.000	.556	.9	1.4	.5	**.1**	1.8
1981–82	Utah	79	9	13.4	.451	**.273**	.730	1.1	2.0	.3	**.1**	3.4
1982–83	Indiana	**82**	**24**	**17.5**	**.453**	.000	**.796**	**1.3**	**2.4**	**.8**	**.1**	**4.5**
Career		201	33	14.7	.435	.120	.750	1.1	2.0	.5	.1	3.5
