= Sleepy Floyd =

American basketball player (born 1960)

Personal information
- Born: March 6, 1960 (age 66) Gastonia, North Carolina, U.S.
- Listed height: 6 ft 3 in (1.91 m)
- Listed weight: 170 lb (77 kg)

Career information
- High school: Hunter Huss (Gastonia, North Carolina)
- College: Georgetown (1978–1982)
- NBA draft: 1982: 1st round, 13th overall pick
- Drafted by: New Jersey Nets
- Playing career: 1982–1995
- Position: Point guard
- Number: 21, 11, 12

Career history
- 1982–1983: New Jersey Nets
- 1983–1987: Golden State Warriors
- 1987–1993: Houston Rockets
- 1993–1994: San Antonio Spurs
- 1994–1995: New Jersey Nets

Career highlights
- NBA All-Star (1987); Consensus first-team All-American (1982); Second-team All-American – AP (1981); 2× First-team All-Big East (1981, 1982); Second-team All-Big East (1980)

Career NBA statistics
- Points: 12,260 (12.8 ppg)
- Assists: 5,175 (5.4 apg)
- Steals: 1,120 (1.2 spg)
- Stats at NBA.com
- Stats at Basketball Reference
Medals
Men's basketball
Representing United States
FIBA U19 World Championship
Gold medal – first place	1979 Salvador	National team

Eric Augustus "Sleepy" Floyd (born March 6, 1960) is an American former professional basketball player. An NBA All-Star in 1987 as a Warrior, he is best known for his tenures in Golden State and Houston.

== Early life, family and education ==
Floyd was born in Gastonia, North Carolina. He received the nickname "Sleepy" playing baseball in the fourth grade, when a spectator yelled "Get that kid out of the game. He's sleeping."

A 6-foot-3-inch (1.91 m) guard, Floyd played competitively at Hunter Huss High School in Gastonia. During Floyd's junior season at Hunter Huss High, he led his team to win in the 1977 North Carolina 4A state basketball championship over rival Ashbrook High, a team led by James Worthy.

== Collegiate career ==
Floyd was a star basketball player at Georgetown University (and was later inducted into the Georgetown University Athletic Hall of Fame). At Georgetown, Floyd excelled all four seasons, leading the team in scoring in 1979, 1980, 1981, 1982 and was team captain in 1981 and 1982. Floyd was named an All-Big East Conference selection in 1980, 1981, 1982, and an All-America in 1981 and 1982. In his final season at Georgetown, Floyd and co-star Patrick Ewing helped lead the Hoyas all the way to the National Championship game, where Floyd scored 18 points, recorded 5 assists, and stole the ball 5 times in a 63–62 loss to North Carolina. Floyd holds the Georgetown Hoyas men's basketball record for career points—2,304.

== Professional career ==
Floyd was drafted by the New Jersey Nets with the 13th pick of the 1982 NBA draft. During the middle of an unspectacular rookie season, Floyd was traded by the Nets with Mickey Johnson to the Golden State Warriors for Micheal Ray Richardson. Floyd quickly blossomed while playing for the Warriors, averaging 16.8 points per game in his first full season with the franchise, and during the 1984–85 NBA season, he averaged a career high 19.5 points per game. Two seasons later, he averaged 18.8 points and 10.3 assists and earned a spot on the 1987 NBA All-Star Team. That season, on December 6, Floyd scored a career high 41 points in 109–104 loss against the Dallas Mavericks. During the 1987 NBA Playoffs, Floyd averaged 21.4 points, 10.2 assists, and 1.8 steals in 10 games, and played a key role in a first round upset of the Karl Malone-led Utah Jazz. The following round, however, the Warriors were eliminated by the eventual champion Los Angeles Lakers.

In December 1987, Floyd was traded with Joe Barry Carroll to the Houston Rockets for Ralph Sampson and Steve Harris. On February 26, 1991, Floyd scored 40 points after playing only 24 minutes (the fewest minutes needed for a 40-point game in NBA history), in a 129–99 win over the Denver Nuggets. Floyd would play 5½ seasons in total with the Rockets before signing as a free agent with the San Antonio Spurs in 1993, a year before the Rockets would win their two consecutive championships. After one season in San Antonio, he returned to the New Jersey Nets, and he retired in 1995 with 12,260 career points and 5,175 career assists.

Floyd still holds the NBA playoff record for points scored in a quarter (29) and in half (39), in Game 4 of the aforementioned 1987 Western Conference Semifinals against the Lakers. Floyd scored 12 consecutive field goals in the fourth quarter, finishing the game with 51 points, and prevented a sweep of the Warriors by in-state rival Lakers.

== Post career ==
After retiring from the NBA, Floyd ran a restaurant for three years, and he started a financial management company. In 2004–2005, he coached junior varsity boys' basketball at Gaston Day School, located in Gastonia, North Carolina, his hometown.

Floyd accompanied a group of basketball players to North Korea in January 2014 for an exhibition game honoring that nation's leader Kim Jong Un as "basketball diplomacy". Less than a half day after his arrival, Floyd regretted the trip, feeling "misled".

The 2024 film Freaky Tales features a plot point involving a fictionalized version of Floyd played by Jay Ellis.

== NBA career statistics ==
Legend
GP	Games played	GS	Games started	MPG	Minutes per game
FG%	Field goal percentage	3P%	3-point field goal percentage	FT%	Free throw percentage
RPG	Rebounds per game	APG	Assists per game	SPG	Steals per game
BPG	Blocks per game	PPG	Points per game	**Bold**	Career high

=== Regular season ===
Year	Team	GP	GS	MPG	FG%	3P%	FT%	RPG	APG	SPG	BPG	PPG
1982–83	New Jersey	43	6	11.5	.426	.286	.844	1.0	1.6	0.4	0.2	5.3
1982–83	Golden State	33	11	22.8	.431	**.545**	.830	2.9	2.2	1.2	0.2	11.7
1983–84	Golden State	77	73	33.2	.463	.178	.816	3.5	3.5	1.3	0.4	16.8
1984–85	Golden State	**82**	**82**	35.0	.445	.294	.810	2.5	5.0	1.6	**0.5**	19.5
1985–86	Golden State	**82**	**82**	33.7	**.506**	.328	.796	3.6	9.1	**1.9**	0.2	17.2
1986–87	Golden State	**82**	**82**	37.4	.488	.384	**.860**	3.3	**10.3**	1.8	0.2	18.8
1987–88	Golden State	18	18	**37.8**	.439	.050	.835	**5.1**	9.9	1.5	0.1	**21.2**
1987–88	Houston	59	55	31.1	.431	.250	**.860**	3.5	6.2	1.2	0.2	13.1
1988–89	Houston	**82**	**82**	34.0	.443	.373	.845	3.7	8.6	1.5	0.1	14.2
1989–90	Houston	**82**	73	32.1	.451	.380	.806	2.4	7.3	1.1	0.1	12.2
1990–91	Houston	**82**	4	22.6	.411	.273	.752	1.9	3.9	1.2	0.2	12.3
1991–92	Houston	**82**	3	20.3	.406	.301	.794	1.8	2.9	0.7	0.3	9.1
1992–93	Houston	52	10	16.7	.407	.286	.794	1.7	2.5	0.6	0.1	6.6
1993–94	San Antonio	53	2	13.9	.335	.222	.667	1.3	1.9	0.2	0.2	3.8
1994–95	New Jersey	48	1	17.3	.335	.284	.698	1.1	2.6	0.3	0.1	4.1
Career		957	584	27.6	.444	.324	.815	2.6	5.4	1.2	0.2	12.8
All-Star		1	0	19.0	.571	.333	.714	5.0	1.0	1.0	0.0	14.0

=== Playoffs ===
Year	Team	GP	GS	MPG	FG%	3P%	FT%	RPG	APG	SPG	BPG	PPG
1987	Golden State	**10**	**10**	41.4	**.507**	.464	**.922**	3.0	10.2	1.8	0.2	**21.4**
1988	Houston	4	4	38.5	.426	.500	.864	1.8	8.5	**2.0**	0.0	18.8
1989	Houston	4	4	40.0	.478	**.533**	.714	**4.5**	6.5	**2.0**	**0.3**	15.5
1990	Houston	4	4	**43.0**	.469	.250	.647	3.8	**10.3**	1.3	**0.3**	18.5
1991	Houston	3	0	13.7	.333	.000	–	0.7	2.3	0.7	**0.3**	5.3
1993	Houston	7	0	8.6	.316	.333	.700	0.6	1.1	0.3	0.0	2.9
1994	San Antonio	4	0	9.3	.250	–	.500	0.3	0.3	0.0	0.0	1.5
Career		36	22	28.8	.457	.414	.814	2.1	6.1	1.2	0.1	13.0

== See also ==
- List of NBA single-game playoff scoring leaders
