= 1979–80 LSU Tigers basketball team =

American college basketball season

1979–80 LSU Tigers basketball

SEC tournament champions

NCAA tournament, Elite Eight
- Conference: Southeastern Conference

Ranking
- Coaches: No. 2
- AP: No. 3
- Record: 26–6 (14–4 SEC)
- Head coach: Dale Brown (8th season)
- Assistant coaches: Ron Abernathy (4th season); Rick Huckabay (1st season)
- Home arena: LSU Assembly Center

1979–80 Southeastern Conference men's basketball standings
	Conf.				Overall
Team	W		L	PCT	W		L	PCT
No. 4 Kentucky	15	–	3	.833	29	–	6	.829
No. 3 LSU †	14	–	4	.778	26	–	6	.813
Alabama	12	–	6	.667	18	–	12	.600
Tennessee	12	–	6	.667	18	–	11	.621
Ole Miss	9	–	9	.500	17	–	13	.567
Mississippi State	7	–	11	.389	13	–	14	.481
Vanderbilt	7	–	11	.389	13	–	13	.500
Georgia	7	–	11	.389	14	–	13	.519
Auburn	5	–	13	.278	10	–	18	.357
Florida	2	–	16	.111	7	–	21	.250
† 1980 SEC tournament winner Rankings from AP Poll

The 1979-80 LSU Tigers men's basketball team represented Louisiana State University during the 1979–80 NCAA men's college basketball season. The head coach was Dale Brown. The team was a member of the Southeastern Conference and played their home games at the LSU Assembly Center.

== Roster ==
1979–80 LSU Tigers men's basketball team
Players
Coaches

Pos.	#	Name	Height	Weight	Year	Hometown
G	22	Brian Bergeron	6 ft 3 in (1.91 m)	175 lb (79 kg)	So	Port Allen, Louisiana
C	34	Tyrone Black	6 ft 8 in (2.03 m)	200 lb (91 kg)	Fr	Baton Rouge, Louisiana
C	44	Andy Campbell	7 ft 2 in (2.18 m)	235 lb (107 kg)	Jr	Hackham West, South Australia
G/F	32	Howard Carter	6 ft 5 in (1.96 m)	235 lb (107 kg)	Fr	Baton Rouge, Louisiana
C	43	Greg Cook	6 ft 9 in (2.06 m)	230 lb (104 kg)	Jr	Roselle, New Jersey
G/F	25	Joe Costello	6 ft 7 in (2.01 m)	200 lb (91 kg)	Fr	Arlington, Texas
F	40	Durand Macklin	6 ft 7 in (2.01 m)	205 lb (93 kg)	Jr	Louisville, Kentucky
G	21	Ethan Martin	6 ft 0 in (1.83 m)	170 lb (77 kg)	Jr	Baton Rouge, Louisiana
F	31	DeWayne Scales	6 ft 8 in (2.03 m)	205 lb (93 kg)	Jr	Dallas, Texas
G	10	Willie Sims	6 ft 3 in (1.91 m)	200 lb (91 kg)	Jr	Long Island City, New York

Head coach

- Dale Brown

Assistant coach(es)

- Ron Abernathy
- Rick Huckabay

Legend

- (C) Team captain
- (S) Suspended
- (I) Ineligible
- (W) Walk-on
- Injured
- Current redshirt

Roster
Last update: 2022-Jan-16

== Schedule ==
Date time, TV	Rank^{#}	Opponent^{#}	Result	Record	Site city, state
Regular season
December 1	No. 7	Florida	W 112–81	1–0 (1–0)	LSU Assembly Center; Baton Rouge, Louisiana
December 3*	No. 6	New Orleans	W 104–78	2–0 (1–0)	LSU Assembly Center; Baton Rouge, Louisiana
December 5*	No. 6	at Tulane	W 80–79	3–0 (1–0)	Louisiana Superdome; New Orleans, Louisiana
December 15*	No. 6	Maine	W 103–81	4–0 (1–0)	LSU Assembly Center; Baton Rouge, Louisiana
December 20*	No. 7	at No. 20 Arkansas	W 56–55	5–0 (1–0)	Barnhill Arena; Fayetteville, Arkansas
December 22*	No. 7	Tulane	W 95–85	6–0 (1–0)	LSU Assembly Center; Baton Rouge, Louisiana
December 28*	No. 5	Boston University	W 92–72	7–0 (1–0)	LSU Assembly Center; Baton Rouge, Louisiana
December 29*	No. 5	Delaware	W 92–64	8–0 (1–0)	LSU Assembly Center; Baton Rouge, Louisiana
January 2	No. 4	at Vanderbilt	L 66–77	8–1 (1–1)	Memorial Gymnasium; Nashville, Tennessee
January 5	No. 4	Mississippi State	W 80–58	9–1 (2–1)	LSU Assembly Center; Baton Rouge, Louisiana
January 7	No. 6	Alabama	L 56–57	9–2 (2–2)	LSU Assembly Center; Baton Rouge, Louisiana
January 12	No. 6	at Georgia	L 71–72	9–3 (2–3)	Georgia Coliseum; Athens, Georgia
January 16	No. 14	Auburn	W 93–82	10–3 (3–3)	LSU Assembly Center; Baton Rouge, Louisiana
January 19	No. 14	at No. 20 Tennessee	W 75–74	11–3 (4–3)	Stokely Athletic Center; Knoxville, Tennessee
January 20*	No. 14	at No. 1 DePaul	L 73–78	11–4 (4–3)	Alumni Hall; Chicago, Illinois
January 23	No. 11	Ole Miss	W 72–66	12–4 (5–3)	LSU Assembly Center; Baton Rouge, Louisiana
January 26	No. 11	at Florida	W 66–58	13–4 (6–3)	Alligator Alley; Gainesville, Florida
January 28	No. 10	at No. 3 Kentucky	W 65–60	14–4 (7–3)	Rupp Arena; Lexington, Kentucky
January 30	No. 10	Vanderbilt	W 83–81	15–4 (8–3)	LSU Assembly Center; Baton Rouge, Louisiana
February 2	No. 10	at Mississippi State	W 75–63	16–4 (9–3)	Humphrey Coliseum; Starkville, Mississippi
February 6	No. 6	at Alabama	W 68–66	17–4 (10–3)	Memorial Coliseum; Tuscaloosa, Alabama
February 9	No. 6	Georgia	W 96–77	18–4 (11–3)	LSU Assembly Center; Baton Rouge, Louisiana
February 13	No. 6	at Auburn	W 50–44	19–4 (12–3)	Beard–Eaves–Memorial Coliseum; Auburn, Alabama
February 16	No. 6	Tennessee	W 73–66	20–4 (13–3)	LSU Assembly Center; Baton Rouge, Louisiana
February 21	No. 5	at Ole Miss	W 77–74	21–4 (14–3)	Tad Smith Coliseum; Oxford, Mississippi
February 23	No. 5	No. 3 Kentucky	L 74–76 ^{OT}	21–5 (14–4)	LSU Assembly Center; Baton Rouge, Louisiana
SEC tournament
February 28	(2) No. 5	vs. (10) Florida; Quarterfinals	W 95–82	22–5 (14–4)	Birmingham-Jefferson Civic Center; Birmingham, Alabama
February 29	(2) No. 5	at (3) Alabama; Semifinals	W 73–66	23–5 (14–4)	Birmingham-Jefferson Civic Center; Birmingham, Alabama
March 1	(2) No. 5	vs. (1) No. 2 Kentucky; Championship	W 80–78	24–5 (14–4)	Birmingham-Jefferson Civic Center; Birmingham, Alabama
NCAA Tournament
March 9	(1 MW) No. 3	vs. (8 MW) Alcorn State; First Round	W 98–88	25–5 (14–4)	UNT Coliseum; Denton, Texas
March 14	(1 MW) No. 3	vs. (5 MW) No. 16 Missouri; Sweet Sixteen	W 68–63	26–5 (14–4)	The Summit; Houston, Texas
March 16	(1 MW) No. 3	vs. (2 MW) No. 2 Louisville; Elite Eight	L 66–86	26–6 (14–4)	The Summit; Houston, Texas
*Non-conference game. ^{#}Rankings from AP Poll. (#) Tournament seedings in parentheses.

== Team players drafted into the NBA ==
Round	Pick	Player	NBA club
2	36	DeWayne Scales	New York Knicks
