= 1980 SEC men's basketball tournament =

Annual college basketball tournament

- Classification: Division I
- Season: 1979–80
- Teams: 10
- Site: Birmingham-Jefferson Convention Complex; Birmingham, Alabama
- Champions: LSU Tigers (1st title)
- Winning coach: Dale Brown (1st title)
- MVP: DeWayne Scales (LSU)
- Attendance: 99,609
- Television: Chesley/TPC Productions

1979–80 Southeastern Conference men's basketball standings
	Conf.				Overall
Team	W		L	PCT	W		L	PCT
No. 4 Kentucky	15	–	3	.833	29	–	6	.829
No. 3 LSU †	14	–	4	.778	26	–	6	.813
Alabama	12	–	6	.667	18	–	12	.600
Tennessee	12	–	6	.667	18	–	11	.621
Ole Miss	9	–	9	.500	17	–	13	.567
Mississippi State	7	–	11	.389	13	–	14	.481
Vanderbilt	7	–	11	.389	13	–	13	.500
Georgia	7	–	11	.389	14	–	13	.519
Auburn	5	–	13	.278	10	–	18	.357
Florida	2	–	16	.111	7	–	21	.250
† 1980 SEC tournament winner Rankings from AP Poll

The 1980 SEC men's basketball tournament took place on February 27 – March 1, 1980, in Birmingham, Alabama, at the Birmingham–Jefferson Convention Complex. The LSU Tigers, who represent Louisiana State University, won the tournament by beating the Kentucky Wildcats in the championship game. LSU also received the SEC’s automatic bid to the 1980 NCAA tournament.

== Television coverage ==
Coverage of all nine games of the tournament was televised through regional syndication by The C.D. Chesley Company through the facilities of Chesley-TPC Productions; that company also broadcast the SEC tournament at the end of the previous season, as well as select weeknight SEC regular season games in both 1979 and 1980.

== Bracket ==
First Round
7	Vanderbilt	71
10	Florida	72
8	Georgia	71
9	Auburn	79

Second Round
2	#5 LSU	95
10	Florida	82
6	Mississippi State	75
3	Alabama	76
1	#2 Kentucky	69
9	Auburn	61
5	Mississippi	76
4	Tennessee	74

Semifinals
2	#5 LSU	73
3	Alabama	66
1	#2 Kentucky	70
5	Mississippi	67

Finals
2	#5 LSU	80
1	#2 Kentucky	78

== All-Tournament Team ==
- F—DeWayne Scales, LSU*
- C—Sam Bowie, Kentucky
- F—Durand Macklin, LSU
- G—Kyle Macy, Kentucky
- F—John Stroud, Ole Miss

== See also ==
- Southeastern Conference
- SEC tournament
