= 1979–80 Auburn Tigers men's basketball team =

American college basketball season

1979–80 Auburn Tigers men's basketball
- Conference: Southeastern Conference
- Record: 10–18 (5–13 SEC)
- Head coach: Sonny Smith (2nd season)
- Assistant coaches: Herbert Greene; Mack McCarthy; Herman Williams
- Captains: Bubba Price; Rich Valavicius
- Home arena: Memorial Coliseum

1979–80 Southeastern Conference men's basketball standings
	Conf.				Overall
Team	W		L	PCT	W		L	PCT
No. 4 Kentucky	15	–	3	.833	29	–	6	.829
No. 3 LSU †	14	–	4	.778	26	–	6	.813
Alabama	12	–	6	.667	18	–	12	.600
Tennessee	12	–	6	.667	18	–	11	.621
Ole Miss	9	–	9	.500	17	–	13	.567
Mississippi State	7	–	11	.389	13	–	14	.481
Vanderbilt	7	–	11	.389	13	–	13	.500
Georgia	7	–	11	.389	14	–	13	.519
Auburn	5	–	13	.278	10	–	18	.357
Florida	2	–	16	.111	7	–	21	.250
† 1980 SEC tournament winner Rankings from AP Poll

The 1979–80 Auburn Tigers men's basketball team represented Auburn University in the 1979–80 college basketball season. The team was coached by Sonny Smith, who was in his second season.

Newcomers to the team this season included freshman signees Darrell Lockhart, Frank Poindexter, Alvin Mumphord, and Byron Henson.

The team played their home games at Memorial Coliseum in Auburn, Alabama. They finished the season 10–18, 5–13 in SEC play. They defeated Georgia in the opening round of the SEC tournament, but lost to Kentucky in the next round.

== Roster ==
1979–80 Auburn Tigers men's basketball team
Players
Coaches

Pos.	#	Name	Height	Weight	Year	Previous school	Hometown
G	3	Taylor Hart	6 ft 2 in (1.88 m)	180 lb (82 kg)	So	Eufaula High School	Eufaula, AL
G	4	Lewis Card	6 ft 3 in (1.91 m)	195 lb (88 kg)	So	Auburn High School	Auburn, AL
F	14	Roy McGrew	6 ft 5 in (1.96 m)	185 lb (84 kg)	So	Fairfield High School	Fairfield, AL
G	21	Bubba Price	6 ft 3 in (1.91 m)	175 lb (79 kg)	Sr	Carver High School	Birmingham, AL
G	22	Eric Stringer	6 ft 1 in (1.85 m)	185 lb (84 kg)	Jr	Oxford High School	Hobson City, AL
F	41	Benny Anthony	6 ft 7 in (2.01 m)	215 lb (98 kg)	Sr	Bainbridge High School	Bainbridge, GA
F	42	Rich Valavicius	6 ft 5 in (1.96 m)	220 lb (100 kg)	Sr	Hammond High School	Hammond, IN
F	44	Earl Banks	6 ft 7 in (2.01 m)	220 lb (100 kg)	Jr	Holy Family High School	Birmingham, AL
C	45	Bobby Cattage	6 ft 9 in (2.06 m)	250 lb (113 kg)	Jr	J.O. Johnson High School	Huntsville, AL
C	32	Darrell Lockhart	6 ft 9 in (2.06 m)	240 lb (109 kg)	Fr	Robert E. Lee High School	Thomaston, GA
C	33	Frank Poindexter	6 ft 6 in (1.98 m)	—	Fr
G	24	Alvin Mumphord	6 ft 4 in (1.93 m)	—	Fr
G	3	Byron Henson	6 ft 3 in (1.91 m)	—	Fr

Head coach

- Sonny Smith

Assistant coach(es)

- Herbert Greene
- Mack McCarthy
- Herman Williams

Legend

- (C) Team captain
- (S) Suspended
- (I) Ineligible
- (W) Walk-on
- Injured
- Current redshirt
