= 1979–80 Alabama Crimson Tide men's basketball team =

American college basketball season

1979–80 Alabama Crimson Tide men's basketball

NIT, Second Round
- Conference: Southeastern Conference
- Record: 18–12 (12–6 SEC)
- Head coach: C.M. Newton (12th season)
- Home arena: Coleman Coliseum

1979–80 Southeastern Conference men's basketball standings
	Conf.				Overall
Team	W		L	PCT	W		L	PCT
No. 4 Kentucky	15	–	3	.833	29	–	6	.829
No. 3 LSU †	14	–	4	.778	26	–	6	.813
Alabama	12	–	6	.667	18	–	12	.600
Tennessee	12	–	6	.667	18	–	11	.621
Ole Miss	9	–	9	.500	17	–	13	.567
Mississippi State	7	–	11	.389	13	–	14	.481
Vanderbilt	7	–	11	.389	13	–	13	.500
Georgia	7	–	11	.389	14	–	13	.519
Auburn	5	–	13	.278	10	–	18	.357
Florida	2	–	16	.111	7	–	21	.250
† 1980 SEC tournament winner Rankings from AP Poll

The 1979–80 Alabama Crimson Tide men's basketball team represented the University of Alabama in the 1979–80 NCAA Division I men's basketball season. The team's head coach was C.M. Newton, who was in his 12th season at Alabama. The team played their home games at Coleman Coliseum in Tuscaloosa, Alabama. They finished the season 18–12, 12–6 in SEC play, finishing in a tie for third place.

The Tide reached the second round of the SEC tournament, where they lost to LSU. Afterwards, the Tide accepted a bid to the 1980 National Invitation Tournament and reached the second round where they lost to Murray State University.

The team lost Reggie King from the previous season to the NBA's Kansas City Kings. The Tide's key freshman signees were guards Mike Davis and Vance Wheeler and forwards Cliff Windham and Eugene Jones.

After the season, coach C.M. Newton resigned to become an assistant commissioner of the Southeastern Conference. After a year in the position, Newton was hired as coach at Vanderbilt University.

== Roster ==
1979–80 Alabama Crimson Tide men's basketball team
Players
Coaches

Pos.	#	Name	Height	Weight	Year	Previous school	Hometown
F	51	Eddie Phillips	6 ft 6 in (1.98 m)	—	So	A. H. Parker High School	Birmingham, Alabama
F	32	Ken Johnson	6 ft 7 in (2.01 m)	—	Jr	Central High School	Phenix City, AL
G	10	Robert Scott	6 ft 1 in (1.85 m)	—	Sr	A. H. Parker High School	Birmingham, Alabama
G	20	Eddie Adams	6 ft 0 in (1.83 m)	—	So	Central High School	Phenix City, Alabama
C	41	Phillip Lockett	6 ft 9 in (2.06 m)	—	So	Livingston High School	Livingston, Alabama
G	44	Mike Davis	6 ft 4 in (1.93 m)	—	Fr	Fayette High School	Fayette, Alabama
F	33	Cliff Windham	6 ft 5 in (1.96 m)	—		Livingston High School	Emelle, Alabama
F		Carl Mitchell	6 ft 6 in (1.98 m)	—
F		Eugene Jones	6 ft 6 in (1.98 m)	—	Fr
G		Vance Wheeler	6 ft 4 in (1.93 m)	—	Fr
F	40	Maurice Myers	6 ft 7 in (2.01 m)	—	So	Holy Family High School	Birmingham, Alabama
		Reggie Strickland	—	—

Head coach

- C.M. Newton

Assistant coach(es)

Legend

- (C) Team captain
- (S) Suspended
- (I) Ineligible
- (W) Walk-on
- Injured
- Current redshirt
