= 1979–80 Kentucky Wildcats men's basketball team =

1979–80 season of University of Kentucky men's basketball team

1979–80 Kentucky Wildcats men's basketball

SEC regular season champions; Great Alaska Shootout Champions

NCAA tournament, Sweet Sixteen
- Conference: Southeastern Conference

Ranking
- Coaches: No. 3
- AP: No. 4
- Record: 29–6 (15–3 SEC)
- Head coach: Joe B. Hall (8th season)
- Captain: Kyle Macy
- Home arena: Rupp Arena

1979–80 Southeastern Conference men's basketball standings
	Conf.				Overall
Team	W		L	PCT	W		L	PCT
No. 4 Kentucky	15	–	3	.833	29	–	6	.829
No. 3 LSU †	14	–	4	.778	26	–	6	.813
Alabama	12	–	6	.667	18	–	12	.600
Tennessee	12	–	6	.667	18	–	11	.621
Ole Miss	9	–	9	.500	17	–	13	.567
Mississippi State	7	–	11	.389	13	–	14	.481
Vanderbilt	7	–	11	.389	13	–	13	.500
Georgia	7	–	11	.389	14	–	13	.519
Auburn	5	–	13	.278	10	–	18	.357
Florida	2	–	16	.111	7	–	21	.250
† 1980 SEC tournament winner Rankings from AP Poll

The 1979–80 Kentucky Wildcats men's basketball team represented the University of Kentucky during the 1979–80 college basketball season. The Wildcats were coached by Joe. B. Hall, who was in his 8th season. Kentucky finished with an overall record of 29–6 (15–3 SEC) and were invited to the 1980 NCAA Tournament as a #1 seed. In their opening round match up they easily defeated Florida St. 97–78. But in their Sweet 16 game Kentucky was upset by #4 seed Duke 55–54.

== Schedule ==
Date time, TV	Rank^{#}	Opponent^{#}	Result	Record	Site city, state
Regular season
November 17*; 1:00, TVS	No. 2	vs. No. 3 Duke	L 76–82 ^{OT}	0–1	Springfield Civic Center; Springfield, MA
November 30* no, no	No. 2	vs. Bradley; Great Alaska Shootout	W 79–58	1–1	Buckner Fieldhouse; Anchorage, AK
December 1* no, no	No. 2	vs. Alaska; Great Alaska Shootout	W 97–68	2–1	Buckner Fieldhouse; Anchorage, AK
December 2* no, no	No. 2	vs. Iona; Great Alaska Shootout	W 57–50	3–1	Buckner Fieldhouse; Anchorage, AK
December 8* no, no	No. 5	Baylor	W 80–46	4–1	Rupp Arena; Lexington, KY
December 10* no, no	No. 5	South Carolina	W 126–81	5–1	Rupp Arena; Lexington, KY
December 12* no, no	No. 5	at Kansas	W 57–56	6–1	Allen Fieldhouse; Lawrence, KS
December 15* no, no	No. 5	No. 1 Indiana; Indiana–Kentucky basketball rivalry	W 69–58	7–1	Rupp Arena; Lexington, KY
December 17 no, no	No. 5	at Georgia	W 95–69	8–1 (1–0)	Omni Coliseum; Atlanta, GA
December 21* no, no	No. 3	California; UK Invitation Tournament	W 78–52	9–1	Rupp Arena; Lexington, KY
December 22* no, no	No. 3	No. 9 Purdue; UK Invitation Tournament • Final	W 61–60	10–1	Rupp Arena; Lexington, KY
December 29* no, no	No. 2	vs. No. 3 Notre Dame	W 86–80	11–1	Freedom Hall; Louisville, KY
January 2; 9:00 p.m., Chesley-TPC	No. 2	Auburn	W 67–65	12–1 (2–0)	Rupp Arena; Lexington, KY
January 5 no, NBC/TVS	No. 2	at Tennessee	L 47–49	12–2 (2–1)	Stokely Athletic Center; Knoxville, TN
January 9 no, no	No. 4	at Ole Miss	W 79–73	13–2 (3–1)	Tad Smith Coliseum; Oxford, MS
January 12 no, no	No. 4	Alabama	L 64–78	13–3 (3–2)	Rupp Arena; Lexington, KY
January 17; 9:00 p.m., Chesley-TPC	No. 6	at Florida	W 76–63	14–3 (4–2)	Florida Gymnasium; Gainesville, FL
January 19 no, no	No. 6	Vanderbilt	W 106–90	15–3 (5–2)	Rupp Arena; Lexington, KY
January 23 no, no	No. 5	at Mississippi State	W 89–67	16–3 (6–2)	Humphrey Coliseum; Starkville, MS
January 26 no, no	No. 5	Georgia	W 56–49	17–3 (7–2)	Rupp Arena; Lexington, KY
January 28; 9:00 p.m., Chesley-TPC	No. 5	No. 11 LSU	L 60–65	17–4 (7–3)	Rupp Arena; Lexington, KY
January 30 no, no	No. 3	at Auburn	W 64–62	18–4 (8–3)	Beard-Eaves-Memorial Coliseum; Auburn, AL
February 2 no, no	No. 3	Tennessee	W 83–75	19–4 (9–3)	Rupp Arena; Lexington, KY
February 6 no, no	No. 5	Ole Miss	W 86–72	20–4 (10–3)	Rupp Arena; Lexington, KY
February 9 no, no	No. 5	at Alabama	W 72–63	21–4 (11–3)	Coleman Coliseum; Tuscaloosa, AL
February 13 no, no	No. 5	Florida	W 95–70	22–4 (12–3)	Rupp Arena; Lexington, KY
February 15 no, no	No. 5	Vanderbilt	W 91–73	23–4 (13–3)	Memorial Gymnasium; Nashville, TN
February 17* no, no	No. 5	at UNLV	W 74–69	24–4	Las Vegas Convention Center; Las Vegas, NV
February 20 no, no	No. 3	Mississippi State	W 71–65	25–4 (14–3)	Rupp Arena; Lexington, KY
February 24; 2:30, NBC	No. 3	at No. 5 LSU	W 76–74	26–4 (15–3)	Pete Maravich Assembly Center; Baton Rouge, LA
SEC Tournament
February 28; 9:00, Chesley-TPC	(1) No. 2	vs. (9) Auburn; Quarterfinals	W 69–61	27–4	Birmingham-Jefferson Convention Complex (13,429); Birmingham, AL
February 29; 9:00, Chesley-TPC	(1) No. 2	vs. (5) Ole Miss; Semifinals	W 70–67	28–4	Birmingham-Jefferson Convention Complex (13,482); Birmingham, AL
March 1*; 8:30, Chesley-TPC	(1) No. 2	vs. (2) No. 5 LSU; Championship	L 78–80	28–5	Birmingham-Jefferson Convention Complex (8,400); Birmingham, AL
NCAA Tournament
March 9*; 3:00 PM, NBC	(1 ME) No. 4	vs. (8) Florida State; Second round	W 97–78	29–5	E.A. Diddle Arena (12,100); Bowling Green, KY
March 13*; 9:37 PM, NBC	(1 ME) No. 4	vs. (4 ME) No. 14 Duke; Sweet Sixteen	L 54–55	29–6	Rupp Arena (23,380); Lexington, KY
*Non-conference game. ^{#}Rankings from AP Poll. (#) Tournament seedings in parentheses. All times are in Eastern Standard Time.
