= 1979–80 Ole Miss Rebels men's basketball team =

American college basketball season

1979–80 Ole Miss Rebels men's basketball

NIT tournament, Second Round
- Conference: Southeastern Conference
- Record: 17–13 (9–9 SEC)
- Head coach: Bob Weltlich (4th season)
- Home arena: Tad Smith Coliseum

1979–80 Southeastern Conference men's basketball standings
	Conf.				Overall
Team	W		L	PCT	W		L	PCT
No. 4 Kentucky	15	–	3	.833	29	–	6	.829
No. 3 LSU †	14	–	4	.778	26	–	6	.813
Alabama	12	–	6	.667	18	–	12	.600
Tennessee	12	–	6	.667	18	–	11	.621
Ole Miss	9	–	9	.500	17	–	13	.567
Mississippi State	7	–	11	.389	13	–	14	.481
Vanderbilt	7	–	11	.389	13	–	13	.500
Georgia	7	–	11	.389	14	–	13	.519
Auburn	5	–	13	.278	10	–	18	.357
Florida	2	–	16	.111	7	–	21	.250
† 1980 SEC tournament winner Rankings from AP Poll

The 1979–80 Ole Miss Rebels men's basketball team represented the University of Mississippi in the 1979–80 NCAA Division I men's basketball season. The Rebels were led by fourth-year head coach, Bob Weltlich. The Rebels played their home games at Tad Smith Coliseum in Oxford, Mississippi as members of the Southeastern Conference.

== Roster ==
1979–80 Ole Miss Rebels men's basketball team
Players
Coaches

Pos.	#	Name	Height	Weight	Year	Hometown
F	42	John Stroud	6 ft 7 in (2.01 m)	215 lb (98 kg)	Sr	Myrtle, Mississippi
G	33	Elston Turner	6 ft 5 in (1.96 m)	200 lb (91 kg)	Jr	Knoxville, Tennessee

Head coach

- Bob Weltlich

Assistant coach(es)

Legend

- (C) Team captain
- (S) Suspended
- (I) Ineligible
- (W) Walk-on
- Injured
- Current redshirt

Roster

== Schedule ==
Date time, TV	Rank^{#}	Opponent^{#}	Result	Record	Site city, state
November 30*		Mercer	W 63–43	1–0	Tad Smith Coliseum; Oxford, Mississippi
December 3*		Tennessee Tech	W 87–67	2–0	Tad Smith Coliseum; Oxford, Mississippi
December 5		at Auburn	L 73–76	2–1 (0–1)	Beard–Eaves–Memorial Coliseum; Auburn, Alabama
December 8*		at UAB	W 67–66	3–1 (0–1)	Birmingham-Jefferson Civic Center; Birmingham, Alabama
December 12		Georgia	L 62–64	3–2 (0–2)	Tad Smith Coliseum; Oxford, Mississippi
December 15*		at Arkansas	L 59–67	3–3 (0–2)	Barnhill Arena; Fayetteville, Arkansas
December 19*		Southern Miss	W 68–65	4–3 (0–2)	Tad Smith Coliseum; Oxford, Mississippi
December 22*		at Memphis	L 75–80	4–4 (0–2)	Mid-South Coliseum; Memphis, Tennessee
December 28*		vs. Michigan	W 71–66	5–4 (0–2)	Louisiana Superdome; New Orleans, Louisiana
December 29*		vs. Virginia Tech	W 70–66	6–4 (0–2)	Louisiana Superdome; New Orleans, Louisiana
January 2		Tennessee	L 65–66	6–5 (0–3)	Tad Smith Coliseum; Oxford, Mississippi
January 5		at Alabama	L 56–78	6–6 (0–4)	Coleman Coliseum; Tuscaloosa, Alabama
January 9		Kentucky	L 73–79	6–7 (0–5)	Tad Smith Coliseum; Oxford, Mississippi
January 12		Florida	W 85–65	7–7 (1–5)	Tad Smith Coliseum; Oxford, Mississippi
January 16		at Vanderbilt	W 67–66	8–7 (2–5)	Memorial Gymnasium; Nashville, Tennessee
January 19		Mississippi State	W 75–64	9–7 (3–5)	Tad Smith Coliseum; Oxford, Mississippi
January 23		at LSU	L 66–72	9–8 (3–6)	Maravich Assembly Center; Baton Rouge, Louisiana
January 26		Auburn	W 71–54	10–8 (4–6)	Tad Smith Coliseum; Oxford, Mississippi
January 30		at Tennessee	W 66–61	11–8 (5–6)	Stokely Athletic Center; Knoxville, Tennessee
February 2		Alabama	W 71–65	12–8 (6–6)	Tad Smith Coliseum; Oxford, Mississippi
February 6		at Kentucky	L 72–86	12–9 (6–7)	Rupp Arena; Lexington, Kentucky
February 9		at Florida	W 57–54	13–9 (7–7)	Florida Gymnasium; Gainesville, Florida
February 13		Vanderbilt	W 89–78	14–9 (8–7)	Tad Smith Coliseum; Oxford, Mississippi
February 16		at Mississippi State	W 73–66	15–9 (9–7)	Humphrey Coliseum; Starkville, Mississippi
February 21		LSU	L 74–77	15–10 (9–8)	Tad Smith Coliseum; Oxford, Mississippi
February 23		at Georgia	L 65–77	15–11 (9–9)	Stegeman Coliseum; Athens, Georgia
SEC tournament
February 28		vs. Tennessee	W 76–74	16–11 (9–9)	Birmingham-Jefferson Civic Center; Birmingham, Alabama
February 29		vs. Kentucky	L 67–70	16–12 (9–9)	Birmingham-Jefferson Civic Center; Birmingham, Alabama
NIT
March 6		Grambling State; First Round	W 76–74	17–12 (9–9)	Tad Smith Coliseum; Oxford, Mississippi
March 10		at Minnesota; Second Round	L 56–58	17–13 (9–9)	Williams Arena; Minneapolis, Minnesota
*Non-conference game. ^{#}Rankings from AP Poll. (#) Tournament seedings in parentheses.

== Team players drafted into the NBA ==
Round	Pick	Player	NBA club
2	27	John Stroud	Houston Rockets
