= 1979–80 Tennessee Volunteers basketball team =

American college basketball season

1979–80 Tennessee Volunteers basketball

NCAA tournament, Second round
- Conference: Southeastern Conference
- Record: 18–11 (12–6 SEC)
- Head coach: Don DeVoe (2nd season)
- Home arena: Stokely Athletic Center

1979–80 Southeastern Conference men's basketball standings
	Conf.				Overall
Team	W		L	PCT	W		L	PCT
No. 4 Kentucky	15	–	3	.833	29	–	6	.829
No. 3 LSU †	14	–	4	.778	26	–	6	.813
Alabama	12	–	6	.667	18	–	12	.600
Tennessee	12	–	6	.667	18	–	11	.621
Ole Miss	9	–	9	.500	17	–	13	.567
Mississippi State	7	–	11	.389	13	–	14	.481
Vanderbilt	7	–	11	.389	13	–	13	.500
Georgia	7	–	11	.389	14	–	13	.519
Auburn	5	–	13	.278	10	–	18	.357
Florida	2	–	16	.111	7	–	21	.250
† 1980 SEC tournament winner Rankings from AP Poll

The 1979–80 Tennessee Volunteers basketball team represented the University of Tennessee as a member of the Southeastern Conference during the 1979–80 college basketball season. Led by second-year head coach Don DeVoe, the team played their home games at the Stokely Athletic Center in Knoxville, Tennessee. The Volunteers finished with a record of 18–11 (12–6 SEC, T-3rd) and received an at-large bid to the 1980 NCAA tournament as the 7 seed in the East region. After an opening round win over No. 10 seed Furman, Tennessee was defeated by No. 2 seed Maryland, 86–75.

This was the second of five straight seasons of NCAA Tournament basketball for the Tennessee men's program.

== Roster ==
1979–80 Tennessee Volunteers men's basketball team
Players
Coaches

Pos.	#	Name	Height	Weight	Year	Hometown
F	14	Dale Ellis	6 ft 7 in (2.01 m)	195 lb (88 kg)	Fr	Marietta, Georgia
F	32	Reggie Johnson	6 ft 9 in (2.06 m)	200 lb (91 kg)	Sr	Atlanta, Georgia
F	44	Howard Wood	6 ft 7 in (2.01 m)	230 lb (104 kg)	Jr	Southampton, New York

Head coach

- Don DeVoe (Ohio State)

Assistant coach(es)

Legend

- (C) Team captain
- (S) Suspended
- (I) Ineligible
- (W) Walk-on
- Injured
- Current redshirt

Roster

== Schedule and results ==
Date time, TV	Rank^{#}	Opponent^{#}	Result	Record	Site (attendance) city, state
Regular season
SEC tournament
Feb 28, 1980*; Chesley-TPC		vs. Ole Miss; Quarterfinals	L 74–76	17–10	BJCC Coliseum; Birmingham, Alabama
NCAA tournament
Mar 6, 1980*	(7 E)	vs. (10 E) Furman; First round	W 80–69	18–10	Greensboro Coliseum; Greensboro, North Carolina
Mar 8, 1980*	(7 E)	vs. (2 E) No. 8 Maryland; Second round	L 75–86	18–11	Greensboro Coliseum; Greensboro, North Carolina
*Non-conference game. ^{#}Rankings from AP poll. (#) Tournament seedings in parentheses. E=East. All times are in Eastern Time.

== NBA draft ==
Round	Pick	Player	NBA club
1	15	Reggie Johnson	San Antonio Spurs
