= DeWayne Scales =

American basketball player

Personal information
- Born: December 28, 1958 (age 67) Dallas, Texas, U.S.
- Listed height: 6 ft 8 in (2.03 m)
- Listed weight: 208 lb (94 kg)

Career information
- High school: David W. Carter (Dallas, Texas)
- College: LSU (1977–1980)
- NBA draft: 1980: 2nd round, 36th overall pick
- Drafted by: New York Knicks
- Playing career: 1980–1986
- Position: Power forward
- Number: 31, 32

Career history
- 1980–1982: New York Knicks
- 1982: Ohio Mixers
- 1983–1984: Detroit Spirits
- 1984: Washington Bullets
- 1984–1986: Evansville Thunder

Career highlights
- SEC tournament MVP (1980)
- Stats at NBA.com
- Stats at Basketball Reference

DeWayne Jay Scales (born December 28, 1958) is an American former professional basketball player.

A 6'8" power forward from Louisiana State University, Scales played in the National Basketball Association (NBA) from 1980 to 1984 as a member of the New York Knicks and Washington Bullets. Scales averaged 4.6 points per game in his NBA career.

== Career statistics ==
Legend
GP	Games played	GS	Games started	MPG	Minutes per game
FG%	Field goal percentage	3P%	3-point field goal percentage	FT%	Free throw percentage
RPG	Rebounds per game	APG	Assists per game	SPG	Steals per game
BPG	Blocks per game	PPG	Points per game	**Bold**	Career high

=== NBA ===
==== Regular season ====
Year	Team	GP	GS	MPG	FG%	3P%	FT%	RPG	APG	SPG	BPG	PPG
1980–81	New York	**44**		**11.0**	.418	**.167**	**.667**	**3.0**	**.2**	.3	.1	**4.9**
1981–82	New York	3	0	8.0	.200	–	.500	1.7	.0	.3	**.3**	1.0
1983–84	Washington	2	0	6.5	**.600**	–	.000	1.5	.0	**.5**	.0	3.0
Career		49	0	10.6	.417	.167	.628	2.9	.2	.3	.1	4.6
