= Howard Carter (basketball) =

American-French basketball player (born 1961)

Personal information
- Born: October 26, 1961 (age 65) Baton Rouge, Louisiana, U.S.
- Listed height: 6 ft 5 in (1.96 m)
- Listed weight: 215 lb (98 kg)

Career information
- High school: Redemptorist (Baton Rouge, Louisiana)
- College: LSU (1979–1983)
- NBA draft: 1983: 1st round, 15th overall pick
- Drafted by: Denver Nuggets
- Playing career: 1983–1999
- Position: Shooting guard
- Number: 32

Career history
- 1983–1984: Denver Nuggets
- 1984: Dallas Mavericks
- 1985–1995: Pau-Orthez
- 1995–1996: Montpellier
- 1996–1999: Irakleio

Career highlights
- First-team All-SEC (1982); 2× Second-team All-SEC (1981, 1983); Third-team Parade All-American (1979)
- Stats at NBA.com
- Stats at Basketball Reference

Howard O'Neal Carter (born October 26, 1961) is a retired American-French professional basketball player. He played college basketball for the LSU Tigers before being drafted 15th overall by the Denver Nuggets in the 1983 NBA draft.

== College career ==
Howard "Hi-C" Carter played basketball for the LSU Tigers from 1980 to 1983, and played in the 1981 Final Four. While at LSU, Carter was named Second Team All-American in 1982 and in 1983.

== Professional career ==
Howard was selected 15th overall out of Louisiana State University in the 1983 NBA draft by the Denver Nuggets, with whom he played only one season, averaging 6.2 points.

His brief NBA career ended with the Dallas Mavericks in 1984–85. He then went on to play nearly a decade in France, eventually obtaining French citizenship and playing on the France national team. Carter finished his playing career with Greek team Irakleio.

== Personal life ==
Carter met Geraldine Vickers, an English travel agency employee from Essex, while he was playing in Greece. Though their relationship did not last, they had a son, Cameron Carter-Vickers, who is a professional soccer player for Scottish Premiership club Celtic F.C. He also represents the United States internationally.

== Career statistics ==
Legend
| GP | Games played | GS | Games started | MPG | Minutes per game |
| FG% | Field goal percentage | 3P% | 3-point field goal percentage | FT% | Free throw percentage |
| RPG | Rebounds per game | APG | Assists per game | SPG | Steals per game |
| BPG | Blocks per game | PPG | Points per game | **Bold** | Career high |

=== NBA ===
==== Regular season ====
| Year | Team | GP | GS | MPG | FG% | 3P% | FT% | RPG | APG | SPG | BPG | PPG |
|---|---|---|---|---|---|---|---|---|---|---|---|---|
| 1983–84 | Denver | **55** | **5** | **12.5** | **.459** | **.263** | .770 | **1.6** | **1.3** | **.3** | **.1** | **6.2** |
| 1984–85 | Dallas | 11 | 0 | 6.0 | .174 | .000 | **1.000** | .3 | .4 | .1 | .0 | .8 |
| Career | | 66 | 5 | 11.4 | .440 | .227 | .774 | 1.3 | 1.1 | .3 | .1 | 5.3 |

==== Playoffs ====
| Year | Team | GP | MPG | FG% | 3P% | FT% | RPG | APG | SPG | BPG | PPG |
|---|---|---|---|---|---|---|---|---|---|---|---|
| 1984 | Denver | 5 | 12.0 | .318 | .200 | – | 1.0 | 1.0 | .8 | .2 | 3.0 |
