= John Stroud =

American basketball player and coach

Personal information
- Born: October 29, 1957 (age 69) New Albany, Mississippi, U.S.
- Listed height: 6 ft 7 in (2.01 m)
- Listed weight: 215 lb (98 kg)

Career information
- High school: West Union (Myrtle, Mississippi)
- College: Ole Miss (1976–1980)
- NBA draft: 1980: 2nd round, 27th overall pick
- Drafted by: Houston Rockets
- Playing career: 1980–1981
- Position: Small forward
- Number: 42

Career history
- 1980–1981: Houston Rockets
- 1982–1983: Caja de Ronda

Career highlights
- Third-team All-American – AP (1980); 2× First-team All-SEC (1979, 1980)
- Stats at NBA.com
- Stats at Basketball Reference

John Stroud (born October 29, 1957) is an American former basketball player and coach who played four years at the University of Mississippi, before being drafted by the Houston Rockets in the second round of 1980 NBA draft as their first pick. Following his playing career Stroud coached for 32 years at various levels.

== Biography ==
=== College career ===
Stroud signed with the University of Mississippi out of West Union High School in Union County, Mississippi where he had received both all state and All America honors. He played for the Rebels from 1976 until 1980. In 1978–79 he led the SEC in scoring with 26.3 points per game and was named as an All-America honorable mention. He again led the SEC in scoring in 1979–80 with 25.2 points per game. During his time at Ole miss he led the Rebels to their first postseason tournament victory over Grambling 76–74 at Tad Smith Coliseum in the National Invitational Tournament.

During his career in Oxford Stroud recorded the highest career point total in Ole Miss history and is still the third-most in league history with 2,328 points and sixth in field goals made in the SEC with 894. He is fifth in free throws made in a season at 233. Only Pete Maravich and Bailey Howell made more free throws in a season. Only five players have attempted more free throws in a single season in the SEC than Stroud. His 39 points in the first round of the 1979 SEC tournament ranks as the second most points ever scored in an SEC tournament game. Likewise, his 15 field goals in that game are the second most in a tournament game. Following his senior season in 1979–80 Stroud was selected to All-America honors for the second straight season and named SEC Athlete of the year.

=== Professional career ===
Following his senior year at Ole Miss, Stroud was the top choice of the Houston Rockets in the 1980 NBA draft. He played with the Rockets from 1980 to 1981 and was a member of the 1981 team that lost to the Boston Celtics in the NBA Finals. Stroud played the 1982–83 season in Europe with Caja de Ronda, located in Malaga, Spain.

=== Coaching career ===
==== University of Alabama (Mens) ====
After a three-year professional career, Stroud entered the coaching profession in 1984 as a graduate assistant at the University of Alabama.

==== New Albany High School ====
In 1985, he became the head basketball coach at W.P. Daniel High School in New Albany, Mississippi, where helmed the boy's program to back-to-back state championships in 1986 and 87. He compiled a 71–24 record in three years.

==== East Mississippi Community College ====
In 1988, Stroud accepted the head coaching position at East Mississippi Community College in Scooba, Mississippi. Making an immediate impact in Scooba, Stroud led EMCC to its first-ever state tournament appearance and its first regional tournament appearance in 25 years. In his two seasons at EMCC, Stroud compiled a 30–30 record and was named the Mississippi Junior College Coach of the Year following the 1989–90 season before assuming the reins of the Millsaps' basketball program the following year.

==== Millsaps College ====
Stroud began an illustrious career at Millsaps in 1990. During his thirteen-year tenure, Stroud guided his teams to three Southern Collegiate Athletic Conference championships and led the Majors to three NCAA tournament appearances. The two-time SCAC Coach of the Year and the all-time wins leader at Millsaps, Stroud compiled a record of 204–131, reaching the 200-victory plateau this season in a 71–48 triumph over Rose-Hulman Institute of Technology on January 31, 2003. Suffering only two losing seasons while at Millsaps, Stroud posted seven seasons of at least sixteen wins, including three campaigns of twenty wins or more. Stroud's best year came in 1994–1995 as he led the Majors to a 25–3 mark, an SCAC title, and a trip to the NCAA Division III Sweet 16. Upon his retirement from Millsaps then President Frances Lucas-Tauchar commented, "John has given Millsaps College thirteen years of superior leadership and coaching. He is also a personal role model, which is the ultimate form of teaching, and he will be greatly missed."

=== Business Career ===
Stroud returned to New Albany in 2003 and went into private business. He first purchased an insurance agency and later opened a Dry Cleaners. He has subsequently been inducted into the SEC Business Hall of Fame.

=== Return to Coaching ===
==== New Albany High School (Girls) ====
In 2004 he became coach of the girls team at New Albany High School where he compiled a 248–131 record over 13 years and won the Class 4A state title in 2011. New Albany also made appearances in the MHSAA's state tournament in 2009 as a semifinalist, 2010 where the team finished as the Class 4A runner-up, and 2015 when the Lady Bulldogs lost in triple overtime to Bay High School in the quarterfinal round.

He retired yet again from coaching in 2017.

== Career statistics ==
Legend
GP	Games played	GS	Games started	MPG	Minutes per game
FG%	Field goal percentage	3P%	3-point field goal percentage	FT%	Free throw percentage
RPG	Rebounds per game	APG	Assists per game	SPG	Steals per game
BPG	Blocks per game	PPG	Points per game	**Bold**	Career high

=== College ===
Year	Team	GP	GS	MPG	FG%	FT%	RPG	APG	PPG
1976–77	Ole Miss	26			.464	.703	5.1	**1.2**	14.5
1977–78	Ole Miss	27			.486	.755	8.5	0.9	18.1
1978-79	Ole Miss	27	27	**39.0**	**.578**	**.799**	**9.1**	0.6	**26.3**
1979-80	Ole Miss	**30**		37.4	.557	.798	7.2	0.9	25.2
Career		110	27	38.2	.527	.777	7.5	0.9	21.2

=== NBA ===
==== Regular season ====
Year	Team	GP	MPG	FG%	3P%	FT%	RPG	APG	SPG	BPG	PPG
1980–81	Houston	9	9.8	.324	–	.750	1.4	1.0	.1	.0	2.8

== Awards and honors ==
=== As high school player ===
- All-America, All-State (’76)
- MS High School All Star game (’76)
- Baseball letterman

=== As collegiate player ===
- Ended Career with 2,328 points; #2 All-Time SEC scoring behind Pete Maravich at the time, currently #3
- Three-time Coaches All-SEC team (’78-’80)
- Two-time Consensus All-SEC, AP, & UPI (’79, ‘80)
- SEC Player of the Year, Tuscaloosa, AL, Tip-Off Club (’78)
- SEC Athlete of the Year (’80)
- Two-time SEC scoring leader (’79, ‘80)
- Mississippi Amateur Athlete of the Year (’80)
- Team Captain (’80)
- 3rd team All America, AP (’80)
- Honorable Mention All American, AP (’79)
- Team MVP (’79, ‘80)
- MVP Sugar Bowl Tournament (’80)
- Holds numerous school records including made field goals & free throws; consecutive double figure scoring (61 games)
- Selected to the Ole Miss Men's Basketball CellularSouth All-Century Team

=== As coach ===
==== At Millsaps College ====
- Two-time SCAC Coach of the Year
- All-time wins leader
- Seven seasons of at least sixteen wins
- Three season of twenty wins or more
- 1995 SCAC title
- NCAA Division III Sweet 16.

==== In High School ====
- Back-to-back boys state championships in 1986 and 1987.
- Girls state championship in 2011

===== As Business Executive =====
- Regions SEC Business Hall of Fame

===== Hall of Fame Memberships =====
- Ole Miss Student Hall of Fame, Colonel Rebel & Student Senate (1980)
- Outstanding Young Men of America (1987)
- Runner-up Clarion Ledger's Most Popular Athlete MS sports history (1989)
- West Union HS Alumni Hall of Fame (1991)
- Ole Miss Athletic Hall of Fame (1995)
- SEC Living Legends Team, Atlanta, GA (1999)
- Millsaps Athletic Hall of Fame (2005)
- SEC Business Hall of Fame (2007)
- Mississippi Sports Hall of Fame (2009)
