= LSU Tigers men's basketball =

NCAA Division I men's basketball program

2026–27 LSU Tigers men's basketball team
- University: Louisiana State University
- First season: 1908–09; 118 years ago
- Athletic director: Verge Ausberry
- Head coach: Will Wade; 6th season, 105–51 (.673)
- Location: Baton Rouge, Louisiana
- Arena: Pete Maravich Assembly Center (capacity: 13,472)
- NCAA division: Division I
- Conference: SEC
- Nickname: Tigers
- Colors: Purple and gold
- All-time record: 1,684–1,288 (.567)
- NCAA tournament record: 27–27 (.500)

NCAA Division I tournament Final Four
- 1953, 1981, 1986, 2006
Other NCAA Division I tournament results
Elite Eight	1953, 1980, 1981, 1986, 1987, 2006
Sweet Sixteen	1953, 1954, 1979, 1980, 1981, 1986, 1987, 2000, 2006, 2019
Appearances	1953, 1954, 1979, 1980, 1981, 1984, 1986, 1987, 1988, 1989, 1990, 1991, 1992, 1993, 2000, 2003, 2005, 2006, 2009, 2015, 2019, 2021, 2022

Conference tournament champions
- SEC: 1980

Conference regular-season champions
- SIAA: 1915, 1917 SEC: 1935, 1946, 1953, 1954, 1979, 1981, 1985, 1991, 2000, 2006, 2009, 2019

Conference division champions
- SEC West: 2000, 2005, 2006, 2009

Uniforms
Home	Away	Alternate

The LSU Tigers men's basketball team (also known as the Louisiana State University Tigers team) represents Louisiana State University in NCAA Division I men's college basketball. The Tigers are currently led by head coach Will Wade. They play their home games in the Pete Maravich Assembly Center located on the LSU campus in Baton Rouge, Louisiana. The team participates in the Southeastern Conference.

== History ==
=== Early history (1909–1957) ===
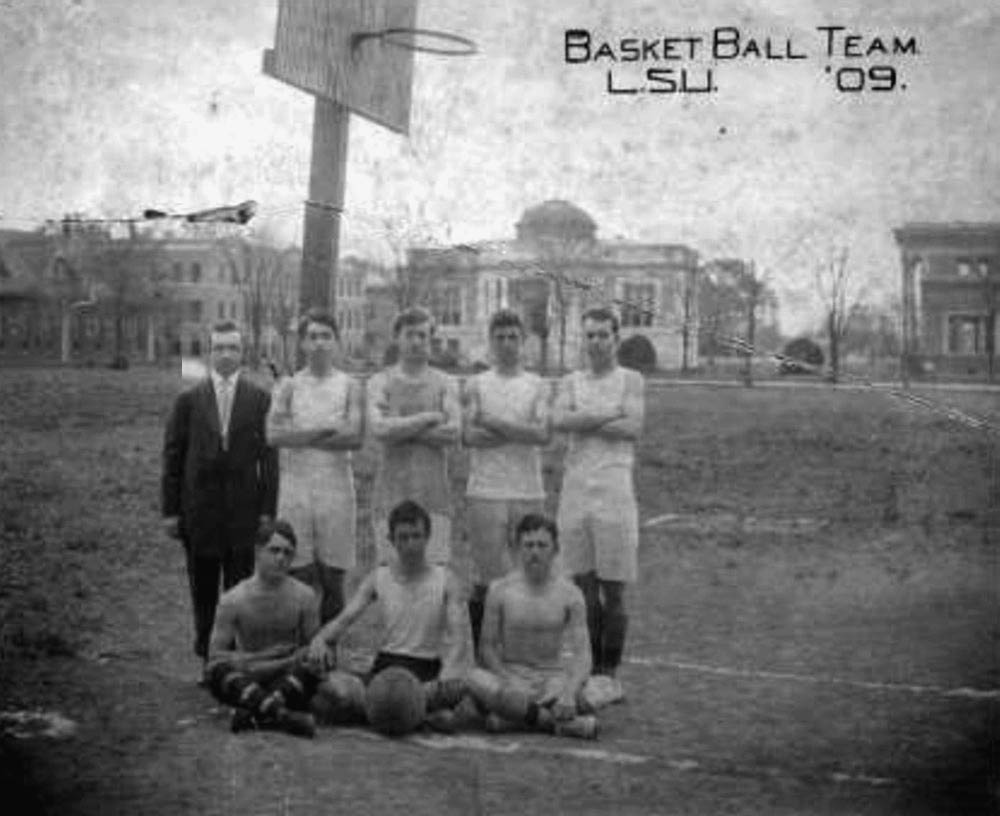
1909 LSU Basketball team at State Field

The first season of LSU men's basketball was the 1908–09 basketball season. That same season, continuous dribbling and shots off the dribble were allowed for the first time. The first game in program history was a 35–20 away game victory versus Dixon Academy. The first home game in program history was an 18–12 victory over Mississippi A&M (now Mississippi State). The team first saw success after hiring former Mercer coach C. C. Stroud in 1914. LSU won the Southern Intercollegiate Athletic Association (SIAA) conference championship in 1917 under coach Stroud.

==== Rabenhorst era ====
Wake Forest alum Harry Rabenhorst coached the team from 1925 to 1957. In 1932 LSU joined the Southeastern Conference (SEC).

The 1934–1935 Tigers – keyed by the play of first LSU All-American Sparky Wade – finished the season at 14–1. The Tigers defeated the Eastern Intercollegiate Conference co-champion Pittsburgh Panthers in the American Legion Bowl by a score of 41–37 in their final game of the season. LSU's lone defeat came to the Southwest Conference co-champion Rice Owls by a score of 56–47 in Houston. LSU has claimed a national championship for the 1935 season (pre-NCAA tournament), but not on the basis of any determination by an external selector. (Note: LSU is the only school that officially claims a national championship on the basis of a win in the American Legion Bowl, an event that made no claim to determine a national champion. The Helms Athletic Foundation retroactively named the 19–1 NYU Violets its national champion for the 1934–35 season. The retroactive Premo-Porretta Power Poll also ranked the Violets as its 1935 national champion. The Premo-Porretta poll ranked LSU fifth, behind second-ranked Richmond (20–0), third-ranked Duquesne (18–1), and fourth-ranked Kentucky (19–2); the poll ranked Pittsburgh—LSU's final opponent–16th nationally.)

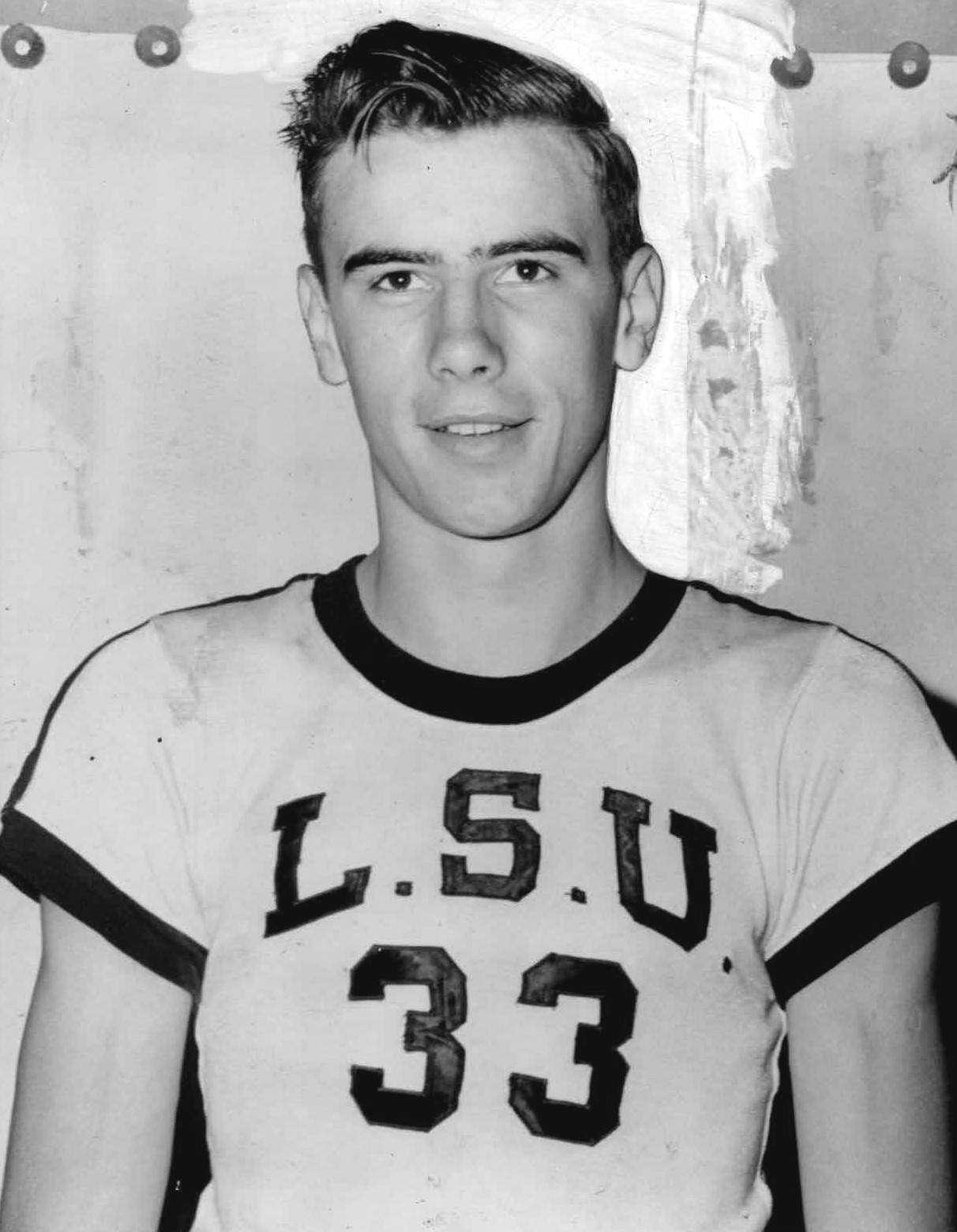
Pettit in 1951

Rabenhorst also led the Tigers to the 1953 Final Four with a team that finished 22–3 overall and 13–0 in conference play, and which included future NBA Hall of Famer Bob Pettit, in college notable for his hook shot. Rabenhorst's 1953–54 Tigers repeated as SEC champions—again finishing undefeated in conference play at 14–0, and at 20–5 overall—and played in the Sweet Sixteen game of the 1954 NCAA tournament, falling 78–70 to eventual national third-place Penn State.

=== Tough times (1957–1966) ===
From 1957 to 1966, LSU was coached by Jay McCreary (1957–1965) and Frank Truitt (1965–66 season). They combined for a record of 88–135. Significant players included George Nattin Jr.

=== Maravich era (1966–1972) ===
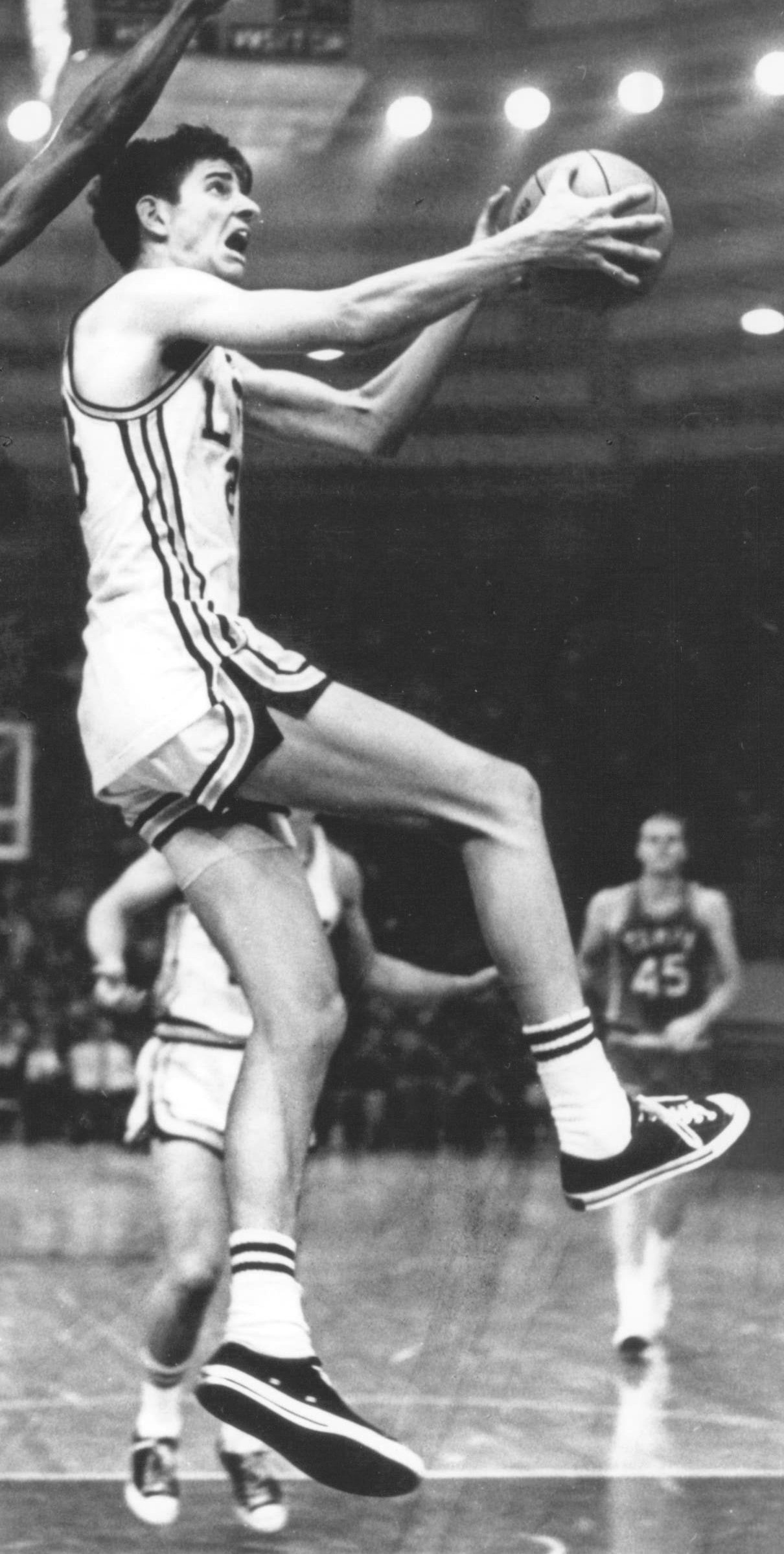
"Pistol" Pete Maravich in 1967

Press Maravich was head basketball coach from 1966 to 1972. He had an overall record of 76–86 at LSU. He led the team to three winning seasons, but did not win an SEC championship or make an NCAA tournament appearance. His 1969–70 team advanced to the NIT Final Four. This era is best known for the exploits of Press Maravich's son, "Pistol" Pete Maravich whom he coached from 1967 to 1970.

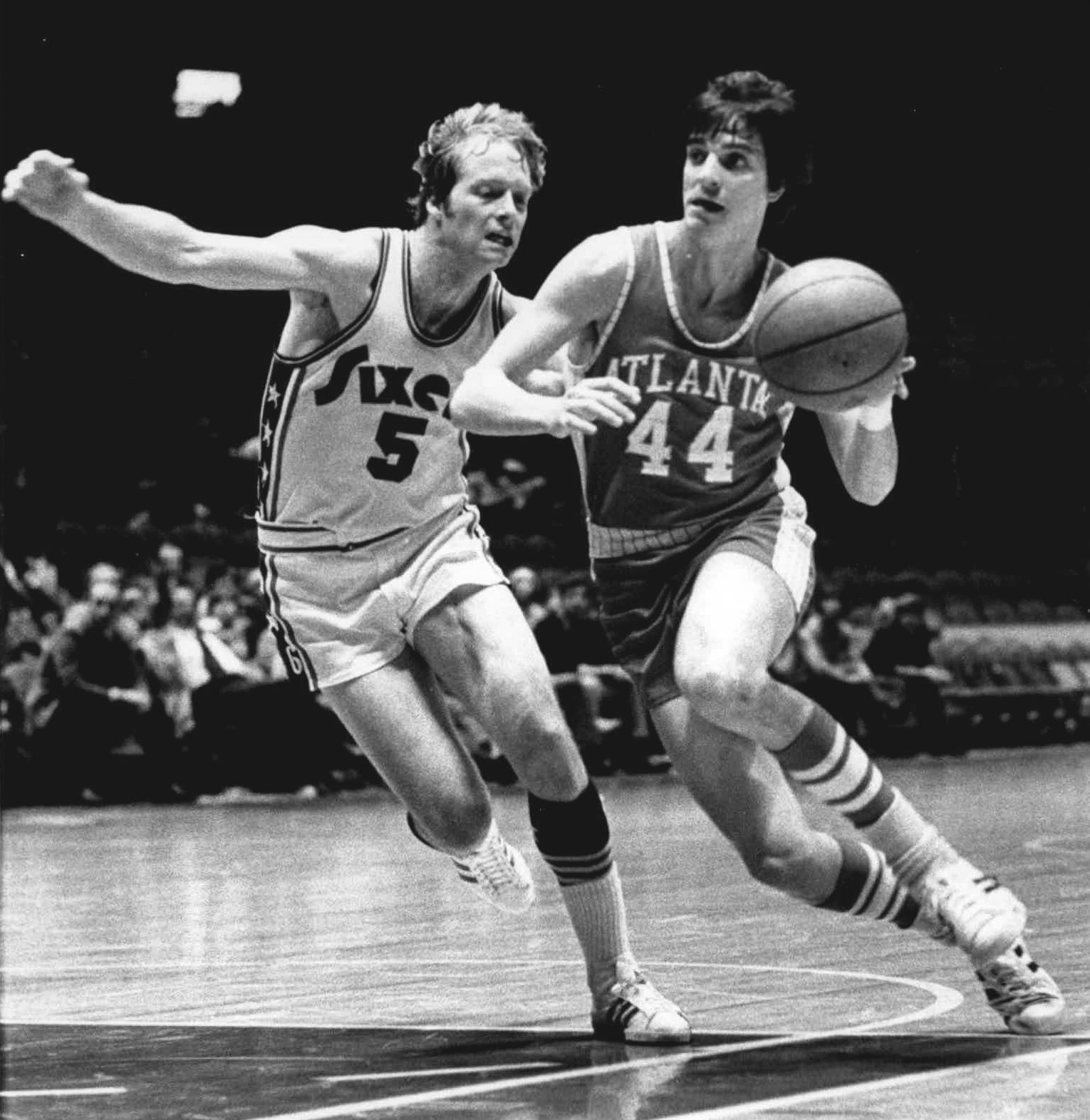
Pete Maravich playing for the Atlanta Hawks

=== Dale Brown era (1972–1997) ===
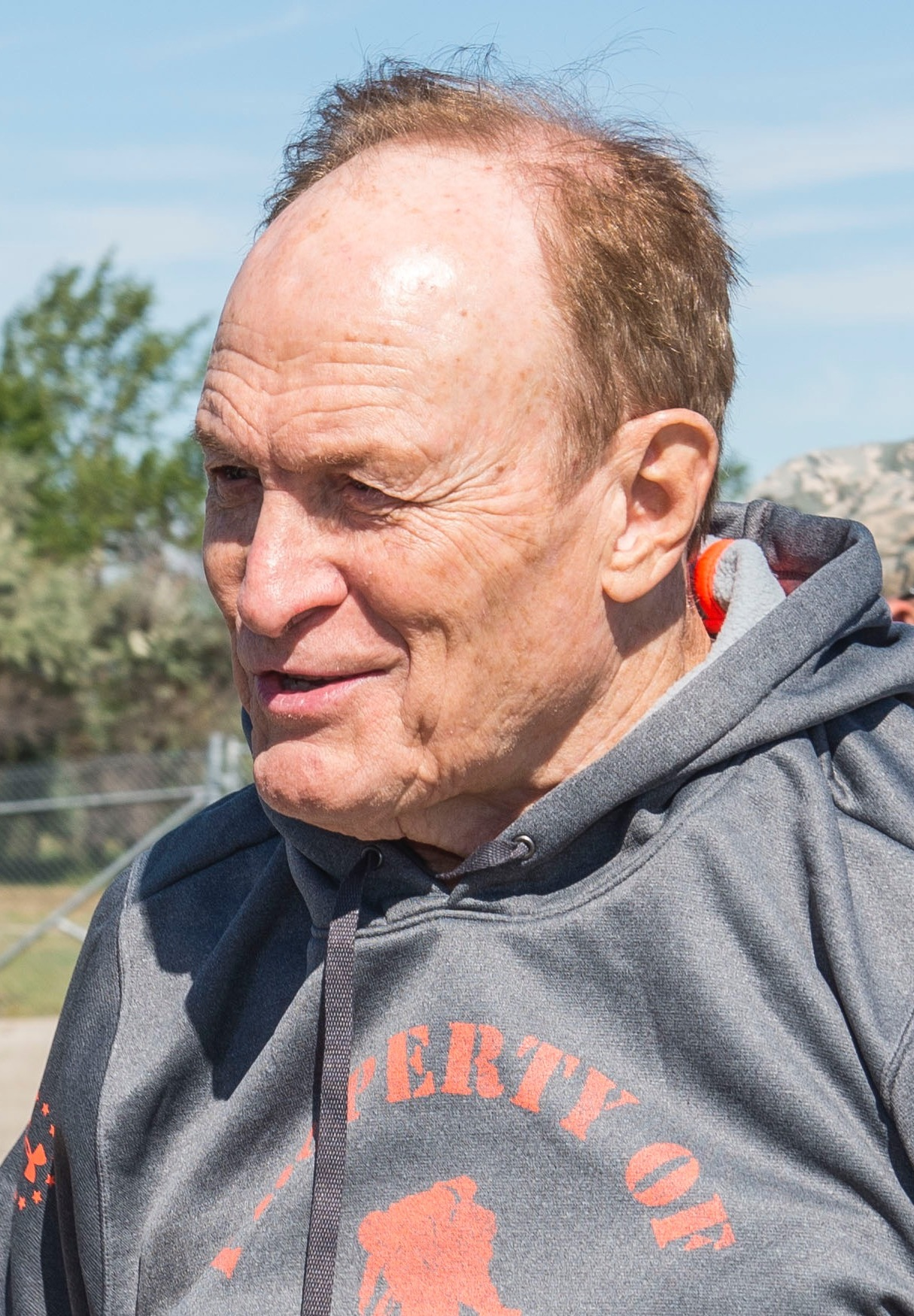
Dale Brown in 2015

Dale Brown was head LSU basketball coach for 25 years, from 1972 to 1997. During his time at LSU, he led the basketball team to two Final Fours, four Elite Eights, five Sweet Sixteens, and thirteen NCAA Tournament appearances. He also led the Tigers to four regular season SEC championships and one SEC Tournament championship. His 1981 team went 31-5 and won the SEC regular season. Small forward Rudy Macklin led the team to the final four, eventually losing to Indiana 67-49. Macklin was named All American and SEC First team.

The 1989 team featured Chris Jackson, later Mahmoud Abdul-Rauf. In 1991, Shaquille O'Neal received the Adolph Rupp Trophy.

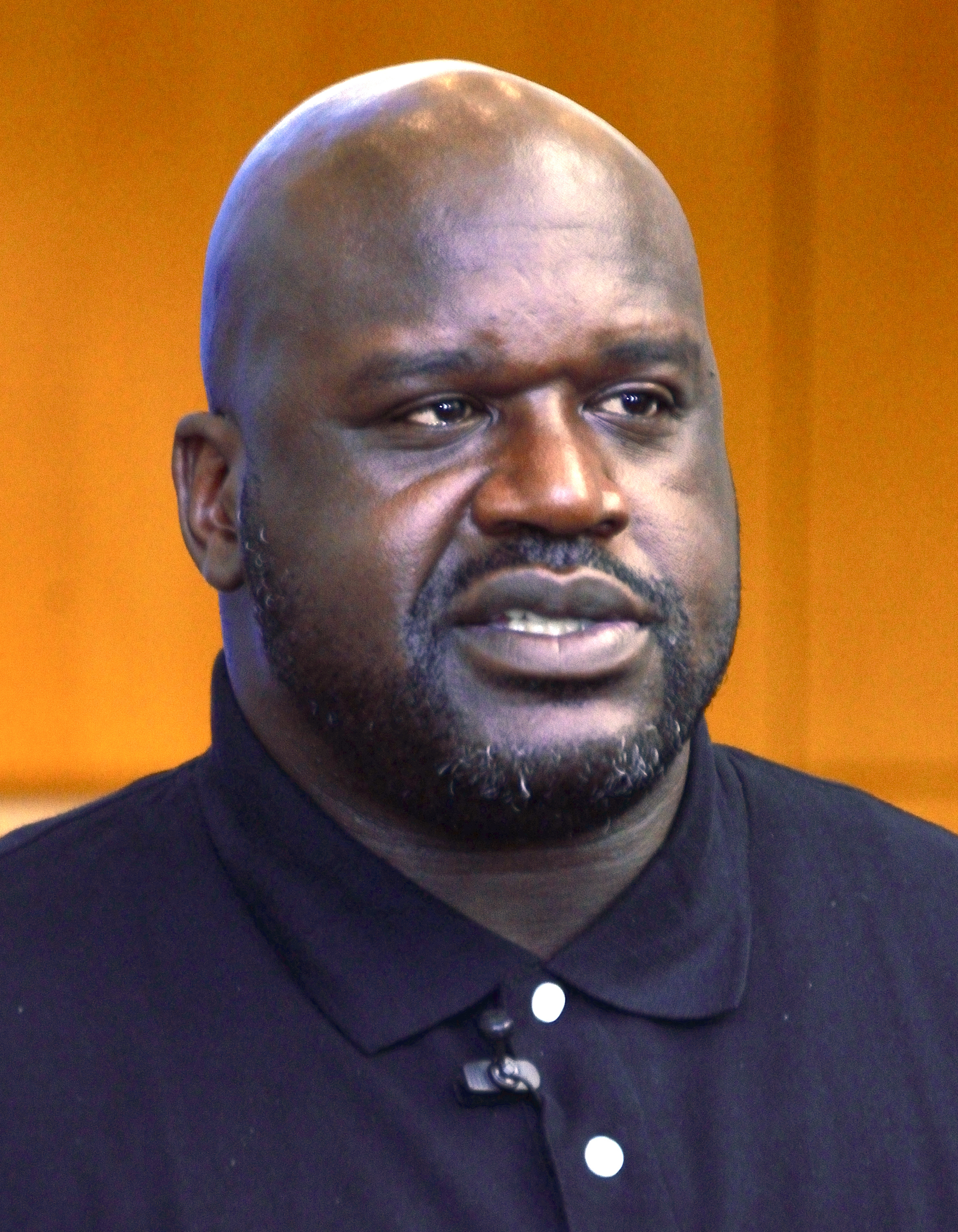
Shaquille O'Neal played for LSU from 1989 to 1992.

==== Lester Earl ====
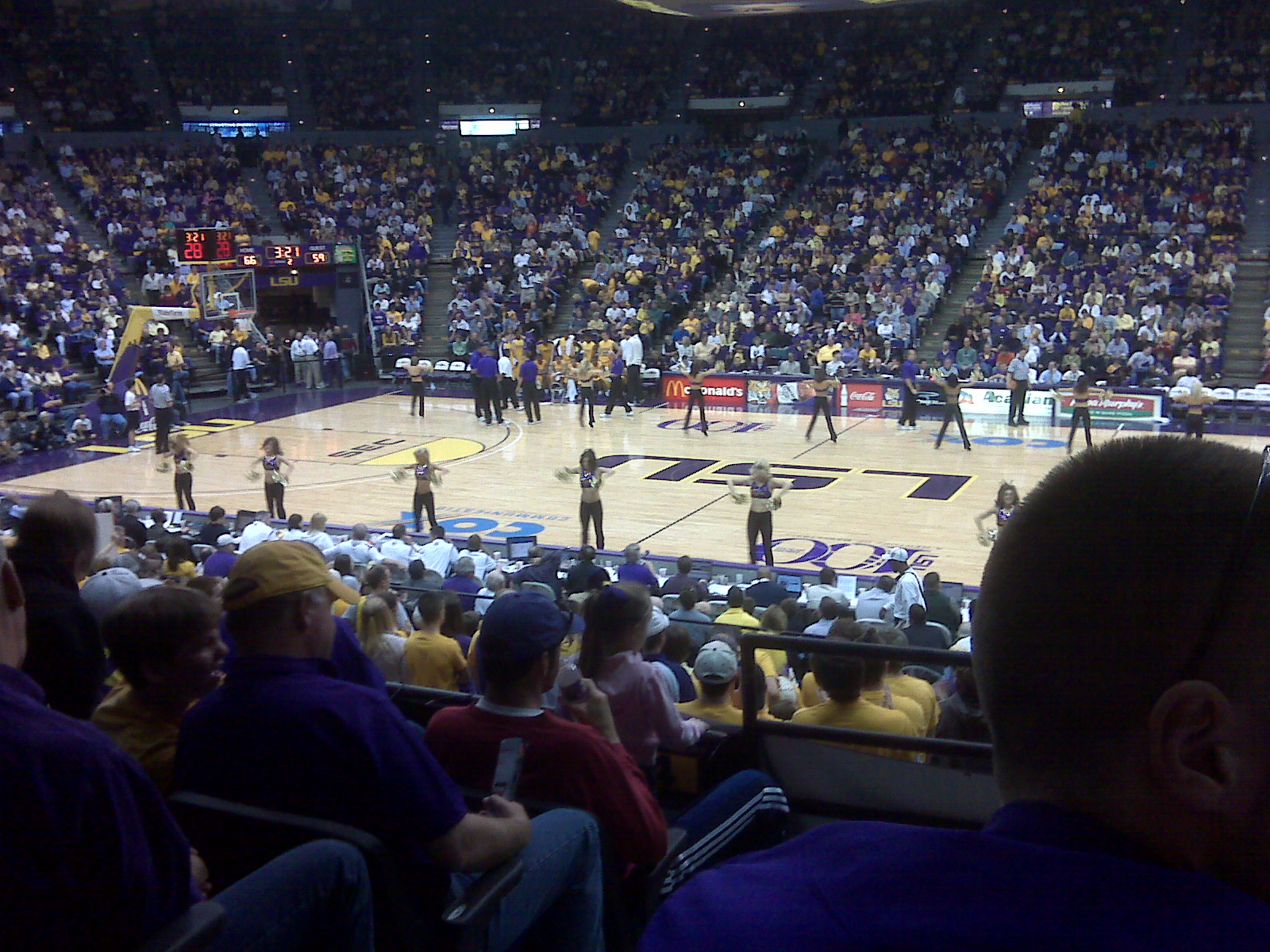
Pete Maravich Assembly Center

In 1996–97, Dale Brown signed Baton Rouge high school phenom Lester Earl, who led Glen Oaks High School to three consecutive Louisiana High School Athletic Association state championships (two in Class 4A, one in Class 5A, the highest classification), with all championship games played at the Pete Maravich Assembly Center. Earl played just 11 games at LSU before he was suspended and transferred to the University of Kansas soon afterward (ironically, Earl played for LSU in an 82–53 loss to Kansas in that season's Maui Invitational). While at Kansas, Earl said that an LSU assistant coach gave him money when he was at LSU. The NCAA quickly began an investigation. It found no evidence that Brown or his assistants paid Earl. However, it did find that a former booster paid Earl about $5,000 while he was attending LSU. The basketball team was placed on probation in 1998.

In September 2007, Lester Earl issued an apology to Brown, then-assistant head coach Johnny Jones, and LSU in general for his role in the NCAA investigation. Earl now has altered his original claims that the NCAA pressured him into making false claims against Dale Brown or else he would lose years of NCAA eligibility. Earl said, "I was pressured into telling them SOMETHING. I was 19 years old at that time. The NCAA intimidated me, manipulated me into making up things, and basically encouraged me to lie, in order to be able to finish my playing career at Kansas. They told me if we don't find any dirt on Coach Brown you won't be allowed to play but one more year at Kansas. I caused great harm, heartache and difficulties for so many people. I feel sorriest for hurting Coach Brown. Coach Brown, I apologize to you for tarnishing your magnificent career at LSU."

The NCAA has declined any new comments on the situation. However, Brown says that he has forgiven Earl. "The most interesting journey that a person can make is discovering himself. I believe Lester has done that, and I forgive him."

=== John Brady era (1997–2008) ===
In 1997, John Brady replaced the legendary Dale Brown as head coach at LSU. When Brady arrived, the program was under probation and stinging from a recruiting scandal. Brady's first two years were rough. In 2000, the Tigers broke through, posting a 28–6 record and an NCAA Tournament Sweet 16 appearance. However, due to the loss of Stromile Swift and Jabari Smith to the 2000 NBA draft, the Tigers could not carry their momentum to the next year, going 13–16 in 2001.

Brady's team entered the 2005–06 season unranked, but were coming off a solid season in which they went 20–10 and made the NCAA tournament. Led by Glen "Big Baby" Davis and Tyrus Thomas, the Tigers won their first outright SEC regular season championship since 1985, and earned a #4 seed in the NCAA tournament. After wins over Iona and Texas A&M, LSU defeated the #1 seed Duke and #2 seed Texas to make it to their first Final Four since 1986. Set at the RCA Dome in Indianapolis, Indiana, the 2006 Final Four was the first since 1980 to feature no #1 seeds (LSU, #2 UCLA, #3 Florida and #11 George Mason). Facing the #2 seed Bruins in the national semifinals, the Tigers were unable to solve UCLA's defense, losing 59–45, dropping LSU to 0–6 all-time in the men's Final Four (and 0–11 in all Final Four games, including an 0–5 mark in the women's Final Four). Despite the loss, the 2005–06 season will be remembered as one of the most successful in LSU men's basketball history.

John Brady was fired in the middle of his 11th season as LSU's head basketball coach and just two seasons after the Tigers' latest Final Four appearance.

On February 8, 2008, Brady was fired from LSU. Earlier news reports stated that he would coach the Tennessee game on February 9, but LSU officials stated that his termination is immediate. Brady's assistant coach, Butch Pierre, took over as the interim head coach. In ten and a half seasons at LSU, Brady compiled a 192–139 record, including two SEC titles and four NCAA tournament appearances. He currently serves as the color analyst on LSU men's basketball radio broadcasts.

=== Trent Johnson years (2009–2012) ===
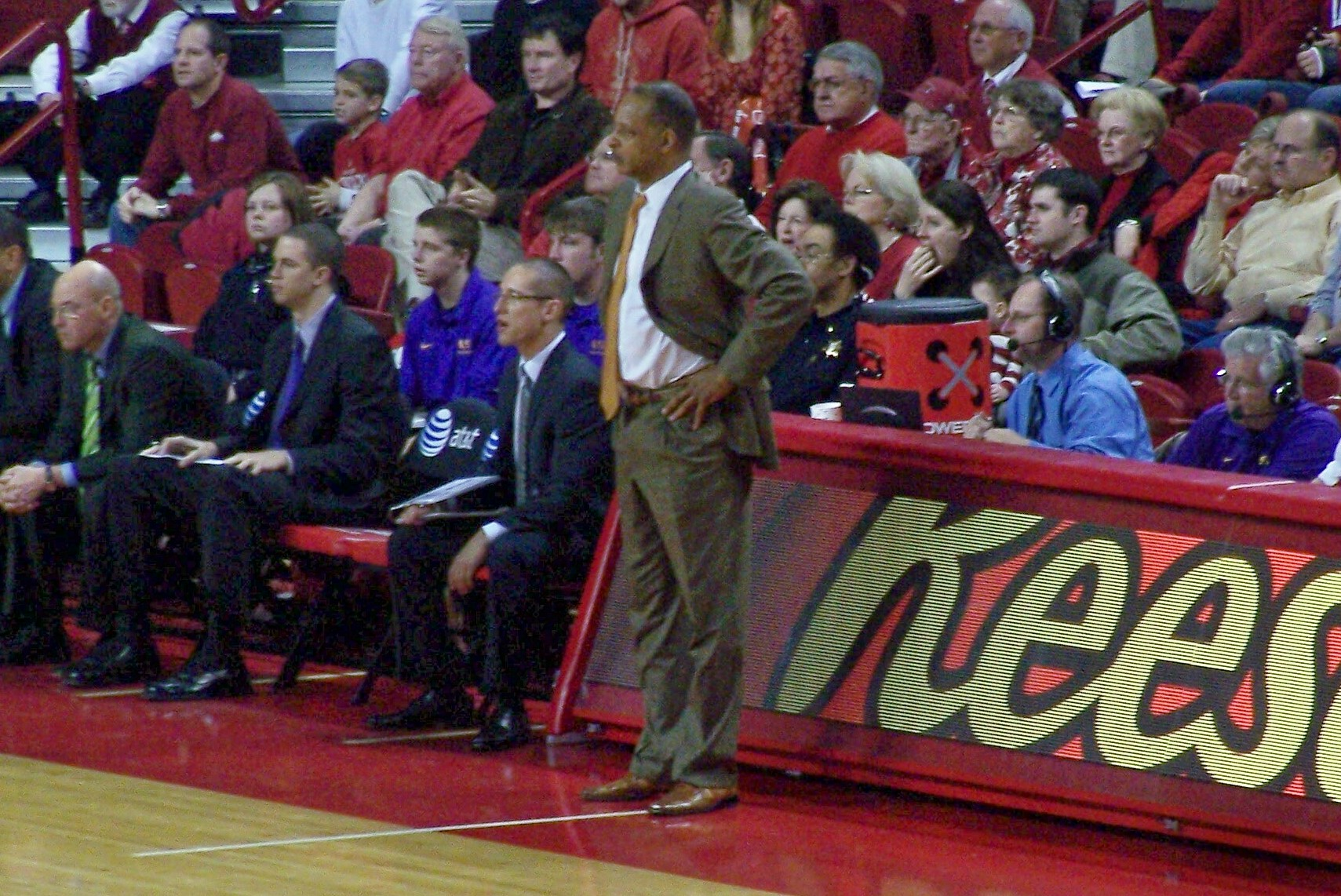
Trent Johnson in 2010

On April 10, 2008, Trent Johnson was officially named the 20th head coach of the LSU Tigers men's basketball team. With the hiring, Johnson became the first African-American head coach of a men's sports team at LSU. In his first season at LSU, Johnson led the Tigers to 27 wins, tied for the third most wins in a season in LSU history. The Tigers won the SEC regular season championship with a record of 13–3. LSU returned to the NCAA tournament for the first time since 2006. In the opening round, LSU defeated nationally ranked Butler one year prior to the Bulldogs starting their run of two straight trips to the NCAA Championship game. They advanced to the second round before falling, 84–70, to North Carolina. LSU had a second-half lead on the Tar Heels and the game was still in the balance entering the final eight minutes. The Tar Heels went on to capture the national championship, their second under Roy Williams and fifth overall.

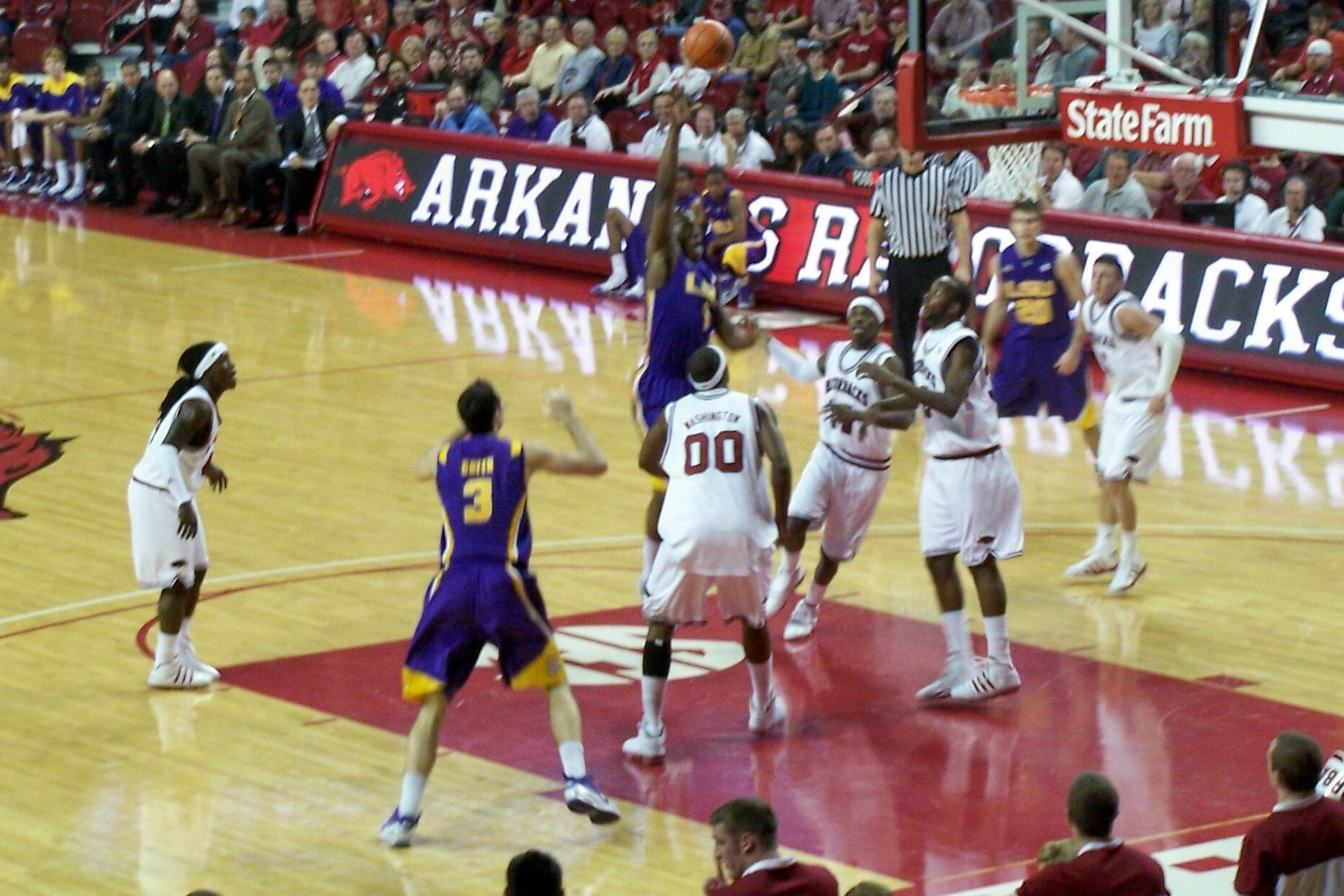
LSU playing the Arkansas Razorbacks in 2010

Johnson was named the 2009 consensus SEC Coach of the Year and was a finalist for four national coach of the year honors as he became the first LSU men's basketball coach to win the league title and take the team to post-season play in his first year at the school. The next two seasons were not nearly as successful, as the Tigers won a combined 5 conference games and went 11–20 in consecutive years.

LSU improved to 18–15 in 2011–12 and earned a berth to the NIT, losing 96–76 in the first round at Oregon. Johnson resigned as LSU coach on April 8, 2012, in expectation of taking the same position at TCU.

=== Johnny Jones era (2012–2017) ===
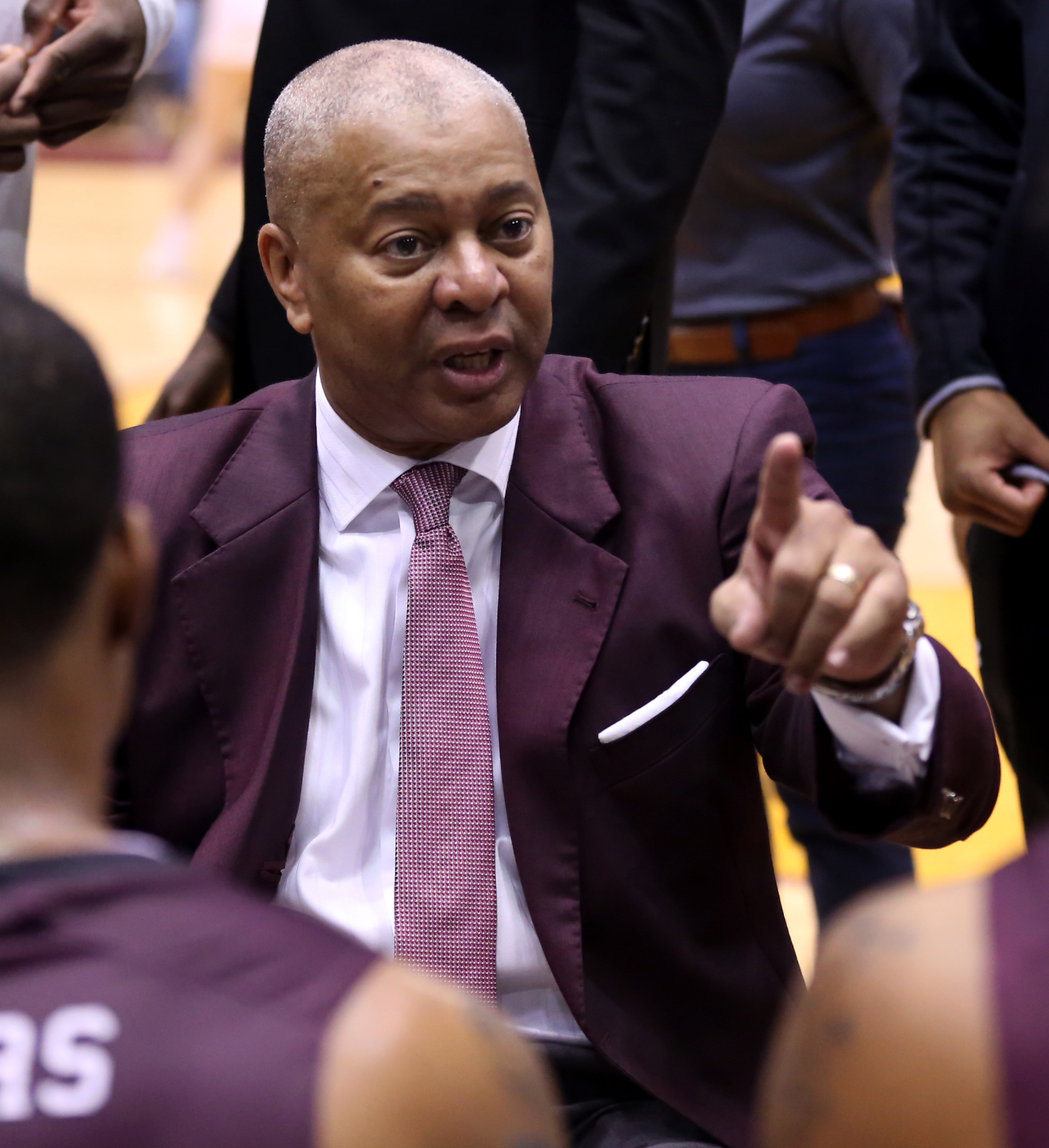
Johnny Jones

On April 13, 2012, Johnny Jones was officially named the 21st head coach of the LSU Tigers men's basketball team. He had an overall record of 90–72 in five seasons at LSU.

In the 2014–15 season, Jones led LSU to its first appearance in the NCAA tournament since the 2008–09 season, where the Tigers fell to North Carolina State in their opening game, 66–65. In the 2015–16 season, Jones led the Tigers to a disappointing 19–14 overall record, including 11–7 in conference play. LSU was ranked 21st in the AP and 19th in the USA Today Coaches poll to start the season. Much of the hype was centered around a top 10 recruiting class which included the No. 1 overall recruit, Ben Simmons. LSU failed to earn a bid to the NCAA tournament, and declined to participate in any postseason play. Following the season, Simmons announced he would leave for the NBA draft.

The Tigers started the 2016–17 season 8–2, but finished the season with a 1–17 slide, ending 2–16 in SEC play and 10–21 overall. Jones was fired at the end of the season.

=== Will Wade era (2017–2022) ===
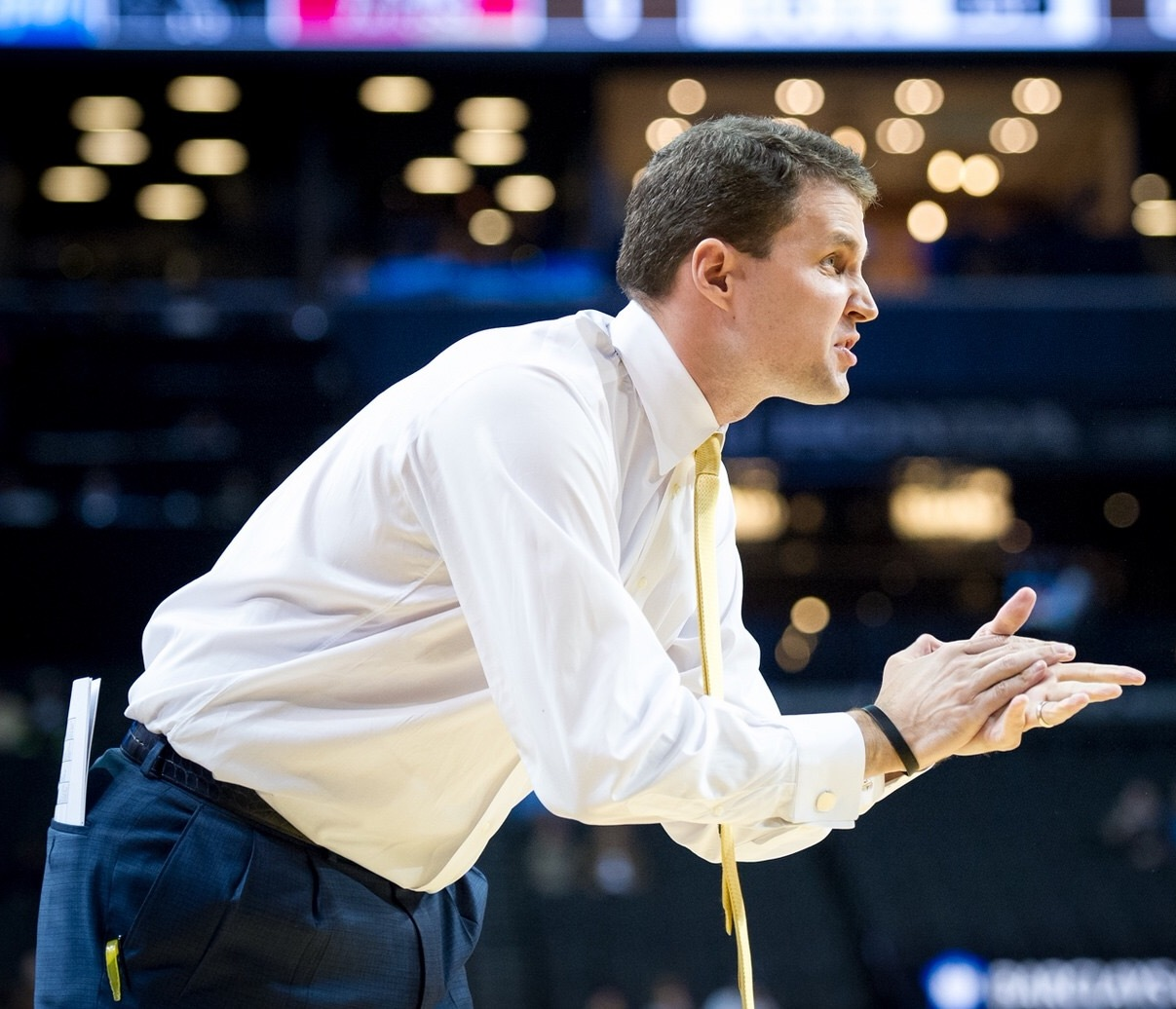
Will Wade in 2016

On March 20, 2017, Will Wade was officially named the 22nd head coach of the LSU Tigers men's basketball team. In his first season he achieved an overall record of 18-15 making the NIT but losing in the second round. During his second season, Wade coached the 2018–19 team to an outright Southeastern Conference regular season championship, going 16-2 in SEC play this was LSU's 11th time winning the SEC regular season. However, the LSU Athletic Department suspended Wade before the conference tournament, after he refused to meet with university officials to discuss his role in conversations he is alleged to have had with a federally convicted college hoops middleman. LSU named Tony Benford interim head coach during Wade's suspension, and he coached the Tigers to the Sweet Sixteen of the 2019 NCAA basketball tournament, losing to Michigan state 80-63. Wade was reinstated after the season, having met with university officials, answered their questions, and denied any wrongdoing.

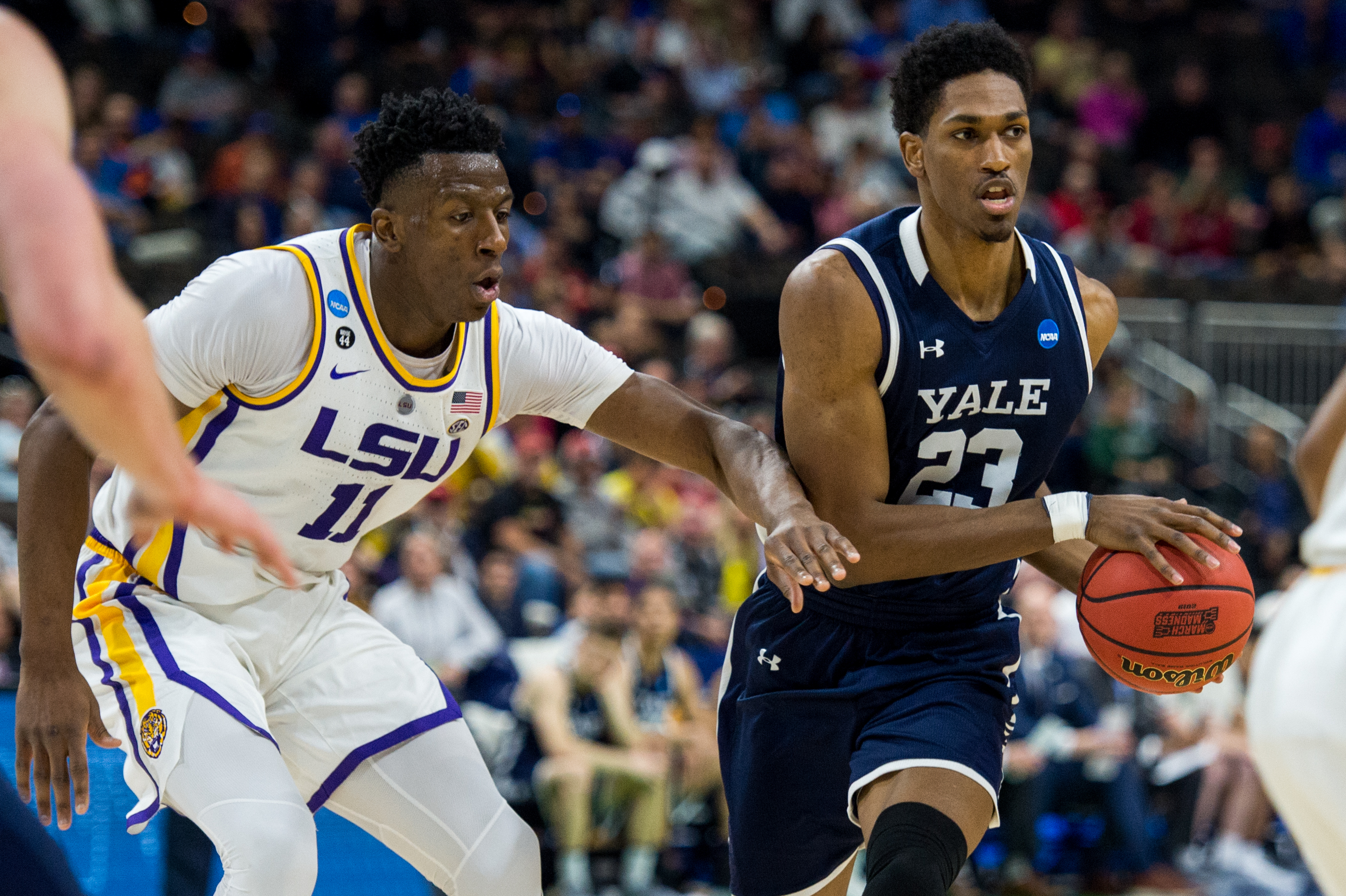
LSU playing Yale in the 2019 NCAA Division I men's basketball tournament

During his 3rd season he coached the Tigers to a 21-10 overall record and the Tigers finished the regular season with a blowout win over Georgia 94-64. Until the season got canceled because of the pandemic. the 2020-2021 season the Tigers finished with an overall record of 19-10 they made the SEC tournament final. eventually losing to Alabama by 1 point 80-79. they made the 2021 NCAA Division I men's basketball tournament as the 8th seed. winning their first-round game against 9th seeded St Bonaventure by a score of 76-61. but in the second round they lost to 4th seeded Michigan by a score of 86-78.

During the 2021–22 season, the NCAA gave LSU a notice of allegations with regard to those recruiting violations, following a multi-year investigation. Wade is accused of five Level I- and two-Level II recruiting violations in the notice, and was fired for cause days later. Kevin Nickelberry was named as interim head coach, as the Tigers were eliminated in the first round of the 2022 NCAA basketball tournament.

=== Matt McMahon era (2022–2026) ===
Murray State head coach Matt McMahon was announced as Wade's permanent successor, signing a 7-year deal. In the first month of his tenure, all 11 scholarship players who were set to return instead chose to enter the transfer portal, a situation Jeff Borzello of ESPN described as "fairly unprecedented", but mistakenly as many new coaches in the past 5 yrs have seen only one or two players return to the new staff.

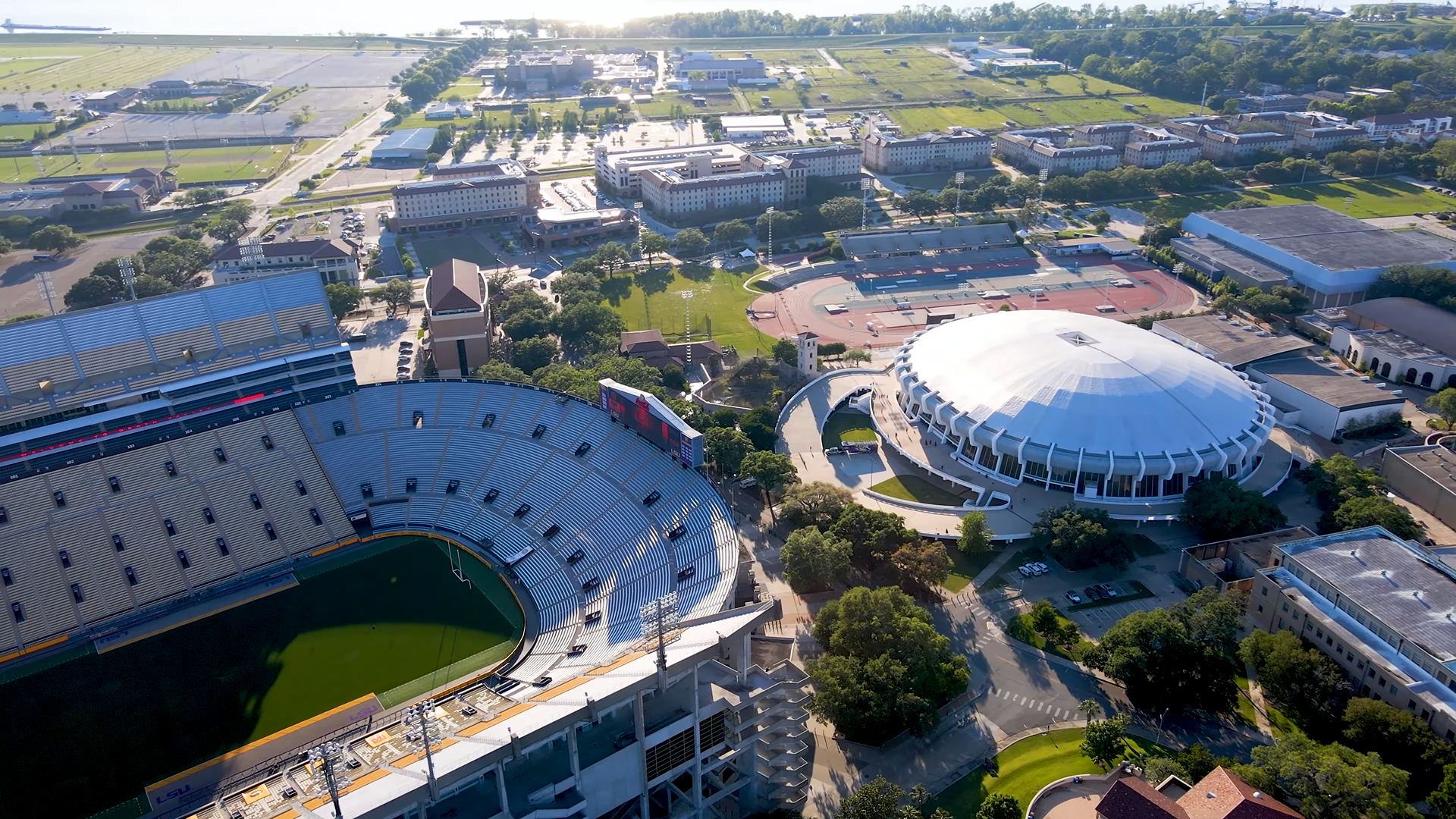
Pete Maravich Assembly Center and Tiger Stadium

The Tigers struggled in McMahon's inaugural season, suffering through a 15-game losing streak in January and February before ending it by defeating Vanderbilt. LSU finished 14–19 overall and last in the SEC at 2–16. Matt Mcmahon's LSU coaching tenure was underwhelming not making the NCAA tournament once in his 4 seasons there. going 15-17 in his last season at LSU. with LSU hiring former coach Will Wade on March 26th, 2026. Will Wade is set to coach the Tigers for the upcoming 2026-2027 season.

== Championships ==
=== National championships ===
Year	Coach	Record	Result
1934–35	Harry Rabenhorst	14–1	LSU 41 Pittsburgh 37 (American Legion "Rose Bowl")
Total national championships: 1

LSU claims a national championship for the 1934–35 season. In 1935, the American Legion sponsored an intersectional "Rose Bowl", promoted as a basketball game "for the national collegiate title," on April 13 at the Convention Hall in Atlantic City, New Jersey.

1934–35 LSU Tigers basketball team LSU defeated the eastern champions the 1934-1935 Pittsburgh men's basketball team Pittsburgh University and beat them by a score of 41–37 and claimed the National championship based on this victory.

=== Final Fours ===
LSU has played in four Final Fours in the NCAA Men's Division I Basketball Championship tournament. The Tigers have a 0-6 all-time record in the Final Four, losing the third place game in the 1953 NCAA basketball tournament and the 1981 NCAA Division I basketball tournament The third place game was discontinued after LSU's 78–74 loss to the Virginia Cavaliers men's basketball in 1981.

Year	Coach	Record
1952–53	Harry Rabenhorst	22–3
1980–81	Dale Brown	31–5
1985–86	Dale Brown	26–12
2005–06	John Brady	27–9
Total Final Fours: 4

=== Conference championships ===
LSU has won a total of 11 conference championships and one conference tournament championship since becoming a founding member of the Southeastern Conference (SEC) in 1933.

Year	Conference	Coach	Overall Record	Conference Record
1934–35	SEC	Harry Rabenhorst	14–1	12–0
1952–53	SEC	Harry Rabenhorst	22–3	13–0
1953–54	SEC	Harry Rabenhorst	20–5	14–0
1978–79	SEC	Dale Brown	23–6	14–4
1979–80	SEC tournament	Dale Brown	26–6	14–4
1980–81	SEC	Dale Brown	31–5	17–1
1984–85	SEC	Dale Brown	19–10	13–5
1990–91	SEC	Dale Brown	20-10	13–5
1999–2000	SEC	John Brady	28–6	12–4
2005–06	SEC	John Brady	27–9	14–2
2008–09	SEC	Trent Johnson	27–8	13–3
2018–19	SEC	Will Wade	28–7	16–2
Total conference championships: 12

== Traditions ==
=== Bengal Brass ===
A group of 72 members selected from the ranks of the band constitute the Bengal Brass Basketball Band, often simply referred to as Bengal Brass. This group of musicians (and percussionist on a drum set) is often split into two squads—purple and gold—and performs at LSU select home volleyball matches, many home gymnastics meets, all home men's basketball, and all home women's basketball games in the Pete Maravich Assembly Center. Bengal Brass also travels with the men's and women's basketball teams during postseason play. The group is led by assistant director of bands, Mr. Dowie.

=== LSU Cheerleaders ===
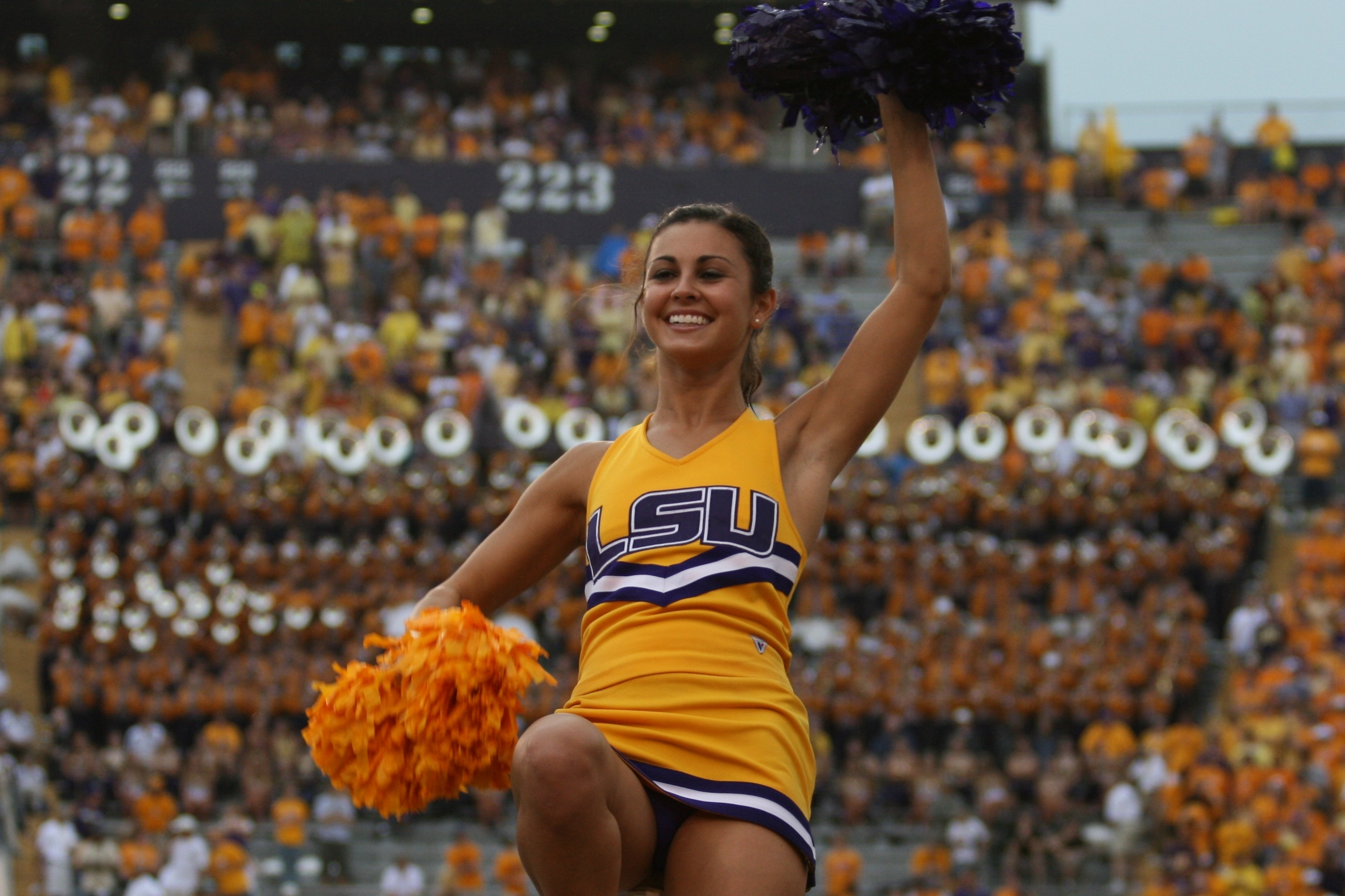
LSU cheerleaders

The LSU cheerleaders consist of both male and female cheerleaders who perform at men's and women's basketball games. The cheerleaders lead the crowd in numerous cheers during game play and breaks. The cheerleaders are located along the baseline for home basketball games. LSU's cheerleaders also compete against other universities cheerleading squads in competitions sanctioned by the Universal Cheerleaders Association (UCA). The 1989 Tiger cheerleaders won the UCA National Championship.

=== LSU Tiger Girls ===
The LSU Tiger Girls were established as a danceline for the LSU men's and women's basketball teams. The all-female squad performs during all home games and other university and non-university sponsored functions. The Tiger Girls also compete against other universities dance teams in competitions sanctioned by the Universal Dance Association (UDA).

== Postseason ==
=== NCAA Tournament history and seeds ===
The Tigers have appeared in the NCAA tournament 24 times. Their combined record is 27–27.

Year	Seed	Round	Opponent	Result
1953		Sweet Sixteen; Elite Eight; Final Four; National 3rd Place Game	Lebanon Valley; Holy Cross; Indiana; Washington	W 89–76; W 81–73; L 67–80; L 69–88
1954		Sweet Sixteen; Regional 3rd Place Game	Penn State; Indiana	L 70–78; L 62–73
1979	No. 3 (Mideast)	Round of 32; Sweet Sixteen	No. 6 Appalachian State; No. 2 Michigan State	W 71–57; L 71–87
1980	No. 1 (Midwest)	Round of 32; Sweet Sixteen; Elite Eight	No. 8 Alcorn State; No. 5 Missouri; No. 2 Louisville	W 98–88; W 68–63; L 66–86
1981	No. 1 (Midwest)	Round of 32; Sweet Sixteen; Elite Eight; Final Four; National 3rd Place Game	No. 8 Lamar; No. 5 Arkansas; No. 6 Wichita State; No. 1 Indiana; No. 1 Virginia	W 100–78; W 72–56; W 96–85; L 49–67; L 74–78
1984	No. 7 (West)	Round of 48	No. 10 Dayton	L 66–74
1985	No. 4 (Southeast)	Round of 64	No. 13 Navy	L 55–78
1986	No. 11 (Southeast)	Round of 64; Round of 32; Sweet Sixteen; Elite Eight; Final Four	No. 6 Purdue; No. 3 Memphis State; No. 2 Georgia Tech; No. 1 Kentucky; No. 2 Louisville	W 94–87 ^{2OT} W 83–81; W 70–64; W 59–57; L 77–88
1987	No. 10 (Midwest)	Round of 64; Round of 32; Sweet Sixteen; Elite Eight	No. 7 Georgia Tech; No. 2 Temple; No. 3 DePaul; No. 1 Indiana	W 85–79; W 72–62; W 63–58; L 76–77
1988	No. 9 (East)	Round of 64	No. 8 Georgetown	L 63–66
1989	No. 10 (West)	Round of 64	No. 7 UTEP	L 74–85
1990	No. 5 (Southeast)	Round of 64; Round of 32	No. 12 Villanova; No. 4 Georgia Tech	W 70–63; L 91–94
1991	No. 6 (Midwest)	Round of 64	No. 11 Connecticut	L 62–79
1992	No. 7 (West)	Round of 64; Round of 32	No. 10 BYU; No. 2 Indiana	W 94–83; L 79–89
1993	No. 11 (Midwest)	Round of 64	No. 6 California	L 64–66
2000	No. 4 (West)	Round of 64; Round of 32; Sweet Sixteen	No. 13 SW Missouri State; No. 5 Texas; No. 8 Wisconsin	W 64–61; W 72–67; L 48–61
2003	No. 8 (South)	Round of 64	No. 9 Purdue	L 56–80
2005	No. 6 (Midwest)	Round of 64	No. 11 UAB	L 68–82
2006	No. 4 (South)	Round of 64; Round of 32; Sweet Sixteen; Elite Eight; Final Four	No. 13 Iona; No. 12 Texas A&M; No. 1 Duke; No. 2 Texas; No. 2 UCLA	W 80–64; W 58–57; W 62–54; W 70–60 ^{OT} L 45–59
2009	No. 8 (South)	Round of 64; Round of 32	No. 9 Butler; No. 1 North Carolina	W 75–71; L 63–77
2015	No. 9 (East)	Round of 64	No. 8 NC State	L 65–66
2019	No. 3 (East)	Round of 64; Round of 32; Sweet Sixteen	No. 14 Yale; No. 6 Maryland; No. 2 Michigan State	W 79–74; W 69–67; L 63–80
2021	No. 8 (East)	Round of 64; Round of 32	No. 9 St. Bonaventure; No. 1 Michigan	W 76–61; L 78–86
2022	No. 6 (Midwest)	First Round	No. 11 Iowa State	L 54–59

The NCAA began seeding the tournament with the 1979 edition.

Years →	'79	'80	'81	'84	'85	'86	'87	'88	'89	'90	'91	'92	'93	'00	'03	'05	'06	'09	'15	'19	'21	'22
Seeds →	3	1	1	7	4	11	10	9	10	5	6	7	11	4	8	6	4	8	9	3	8	6

Prior to seeding LSU appeared in the 1953 and 1954 NCAA Tournaments.

The 1986 team one of the lowest-seeded teams ever to advance to the Final Four, along with George Mason in 2006, Virginia Commonwealth in 2011, Loyola–Chicago in 2018, and UCLA in 2021.

=== NIT results ===
The Tigers have appeared in the National Invitation Tournament (NIT) nine times. Their combined record is 5–10.

Year	Round	Opponent	Result
1970	First Round; Quarterfinals; Semifinals; 3rd Place Game	Georgetown; Oklahoma; Marquette; Army	W 83–82; W 97–94; L 79–101; L 68–75
1982	First Round	Tulane	L 72–83
1983	First Round	New Orleans	L 94–99
2002	First Round; Second Round	Iowa; Ball State	W 63–61; L 65–75
2004	First Round	Oklahoma	L 61–70
2012	First Round	Oregon	L 76–96
2014	First Round; Second Round	San Francisco; SMU	W 71–63; L 67–80
2018	First Round; Second Round	Louisiana; Utah	W 84–76; L 71–95
2024	First Round	North Texas	L 77–84

== National award winners ==
=== National Player of the Year ===
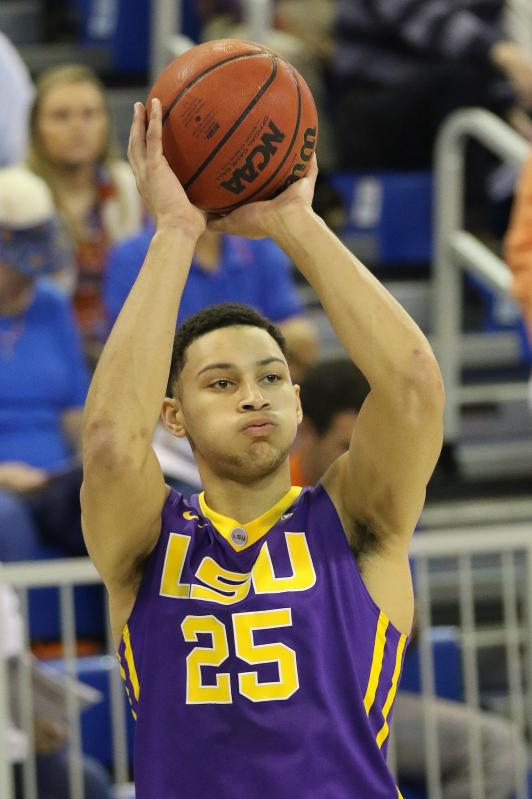
Ben Simmons

Year	Player	Position
1970	Pete Maravich	G
1991	Shaquille O'Neal	C

=== National Coach of the Year ===
Year	Coach	Position
1981	Dale Brown	Head coach

=== National Freshman of the Year ===
Year	Player	Position
1990	Chris Jackson	G
2016	Ben Simmons	F

== Prominent players and coaches ==
=== Naismith Memorial Basketball Hall of Fame inductees ===
Player	Position	Career	Induction
Bob Pettit	PF	1950–54	1971
Pete Maravich	G	1966–70	1987
Shaquille O'Neal	C	1989–92	2016

=== National Collegiate Basketball Hall of Fame inductees ===
Player	Position	Career	Induction
Bob Pettit	PF	1950–54	2006
Pete Maravich	G	1966–70	2006
Shaquille O'Neal	C	1989–1992	2014
Dale Brown	Head coach	1972–1997	2014

=== Retired numbers ===
LSU has retired five jersey numbers:

LSU Tigers retired numbers
No.	Player	Pos.	Career	No. ret.	Ref.
23	Pete Maravich	G	1967–1970	2007	
33	Shaquille O'Neal	C	1989–1992	2000	
35	Mahmoud Abdul-Rauf	G	1988–1990	2020	
40	Rudy Macklin	SF	1976–1981	2009	
50	Bob Pettit	PF	1950–1954	1954	

=== SEC Player of the Year ===
Player	Year(s)
Pete Maravich	1968, 1969, 1970
Rudy Macklin	1981
Chris Jackson	1989, 1990
Shaquille O'Neal	1991, 1992
Stromile Swift	2000
Brandon Bass	2005
Glen Davis	2006
Marcus Thornton	2009

=== SEC Freshman of the Year ===
Player	Year(s)
Brandon Bass	2003–04
Glen Davis	2004–05
Tyrus Thomas	2005–06
Ben Simmons	2015–16

=== LSU's All-Americans ===
Player	Position	Year(s)	Selectors
Malcolm "Sparky" Wade	Guard	1935†	Converse Yearbook
Bobby Lowther	Forward	1946†	Helms Athletic Foundation
Bob Pettit (3)	Forward	1952, 1953†, 1954†	Converse Yearbook, Helms Athletic Foundation, Associated Press, UPI, NABC, International News Service, Look Magazine, Colliers (Basketball coaches), Newspapers Enterprise Association, Tempo Magazine
Roger Sigler	Forward	1956	Helms Athletic Foundation
"Pistol Pete" Maravich (3)	Guard	1968†, 1969†, 1970†	Converse Yearbook, Helms Athletic Foundation, Associated Press, UPI, NABC, International News Service, Sporting News, Newspapers Enterprise Association, United States Writers Basketball Association
Al Green	Guard	1979	Converse Yearbook
Durand "Rudy" Macklin (2)	Forward	1980†, 1981†	Converse Yearbook, Sporting News, United States Writers Basketball Association, UPI, Basketball Times, John R. Wooden Award
Ethan Martin	Guard	1981	Converse Yearbook
Howard Carter	Guard	1982, 1983	Converse Yearbook
Chris Jackson (2)	Guard	1989†, 1990†	United States Basketball Writers Association, Associated Press, UPI, Sporting News, Basketball Times, NABC, John R. Wooden Award
Shaquille O'Neal (2)	Center	1991†, 1992†	United States Basketball Writers Association, Associated Press, UPI, Sporting News, Basketball Times, NABC, John R. Wooden Award
Stromile Swift	Forward	2000	United States Basketball Writers Association, Basketball Times, NABC
Glen Davis	Forward	2006†	Associated Press, John R. Wooden Award, CollegeBasketballInsider.com
Marcus Thornton	Guard	2009	Rivals.com
Ben Simmons	Forward	2016†	Sporting News, United States Basketball Writers Association
Source:2013-14 LSU Men's Basketball Media Guide †: First-team All-American

=== National team members ===
Player	Position	Years at LSU	Country	Year
Zoran Jovanović	C	1984–87	Yugoslavia	1990, 1991
Shaquille O'Neal	C	1989–92	United States	1994, 1996

== LSU and the NBA ==
=== LSU Tigers players drafted in first round of NBA draft ===
Year drafted	Pick	Player	Position	Career
1952	4	Joe Dean	G	1949–52
1954	2	Bob Pettit	PF/C	1951–54
1970	3	Pete Maravich	SG	1967–70
1983	15	Howard Carter	SG	1979–83
1985	22	Jerry Reynolds	SG/SF	1982–85
1986	12	John Williams	PF/C	1984–86
1990	3	Chris Jackson (Mahmoud Abdul-Rauf)	PG	1988–90
1991	23	Stanley Roberts	C	1989–90
**1992**	**1**	**Shaquille O'Neal**	**C**	**1989–92**
1993	26	Geert Hammink	C	1988–93
2000	2	Stromile Swift	PF/C	1998–2000
2006	4	Tyrus Thomas	PF	2005–06
2008	14	Anthony Randolph	PF	2007–08
2015	25	Jarell Martin	PF	2013–15
**2016**	**1**	**Ben Simmons**	**PF**	**2015–16**
2021	27	Cam Thomas	SG	2020–21
2022	17	Tari Eason	PF	2021–22

- **Bold** indicates first overall pick in NBA draft

== International professional players from LSU ==
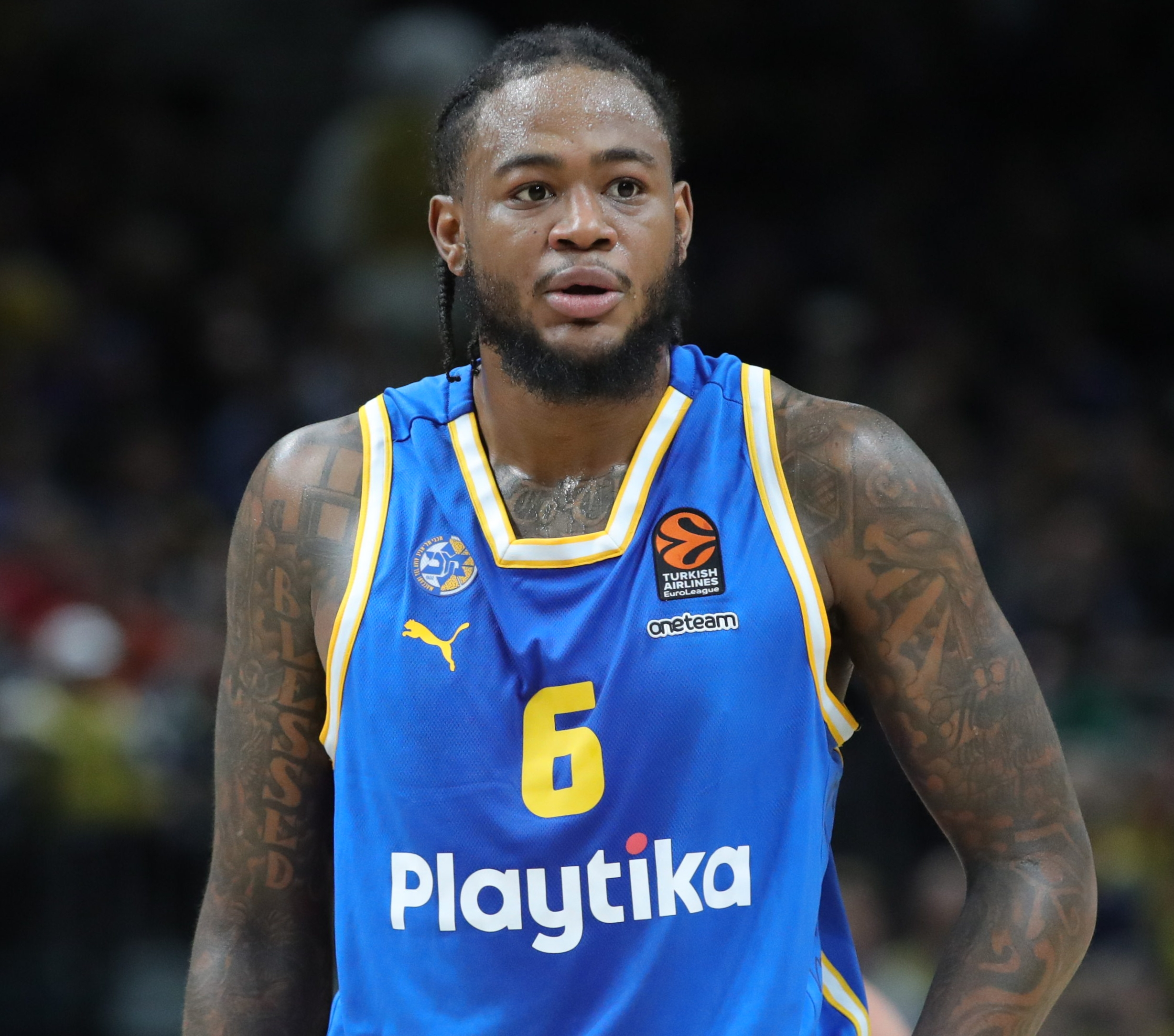
Jarell Martin

- Antonio Blakeney (born 1996), basketball player for Hapoel Be'er Sheva of the Israeli Basketball Premier League; former NBA player
- Anthony Hickey (born 1992), basketball player for Hapoel Haifa in the Israeli Basketball Premier League
- Jarell Martin (born 1994), basketball player for Maccabi Tel Aviv of the Israeli Basketball Premier League
- Brandon Sampson (born 1997), basketball player for Hapoel Be'er Sheva of the Israeli Basketball Premier League
- Storm Warren (born 1988), basketball player in the Israeli Basketball Premier League

== Arenas ==
=== Pete Maravich Assembly Center ===
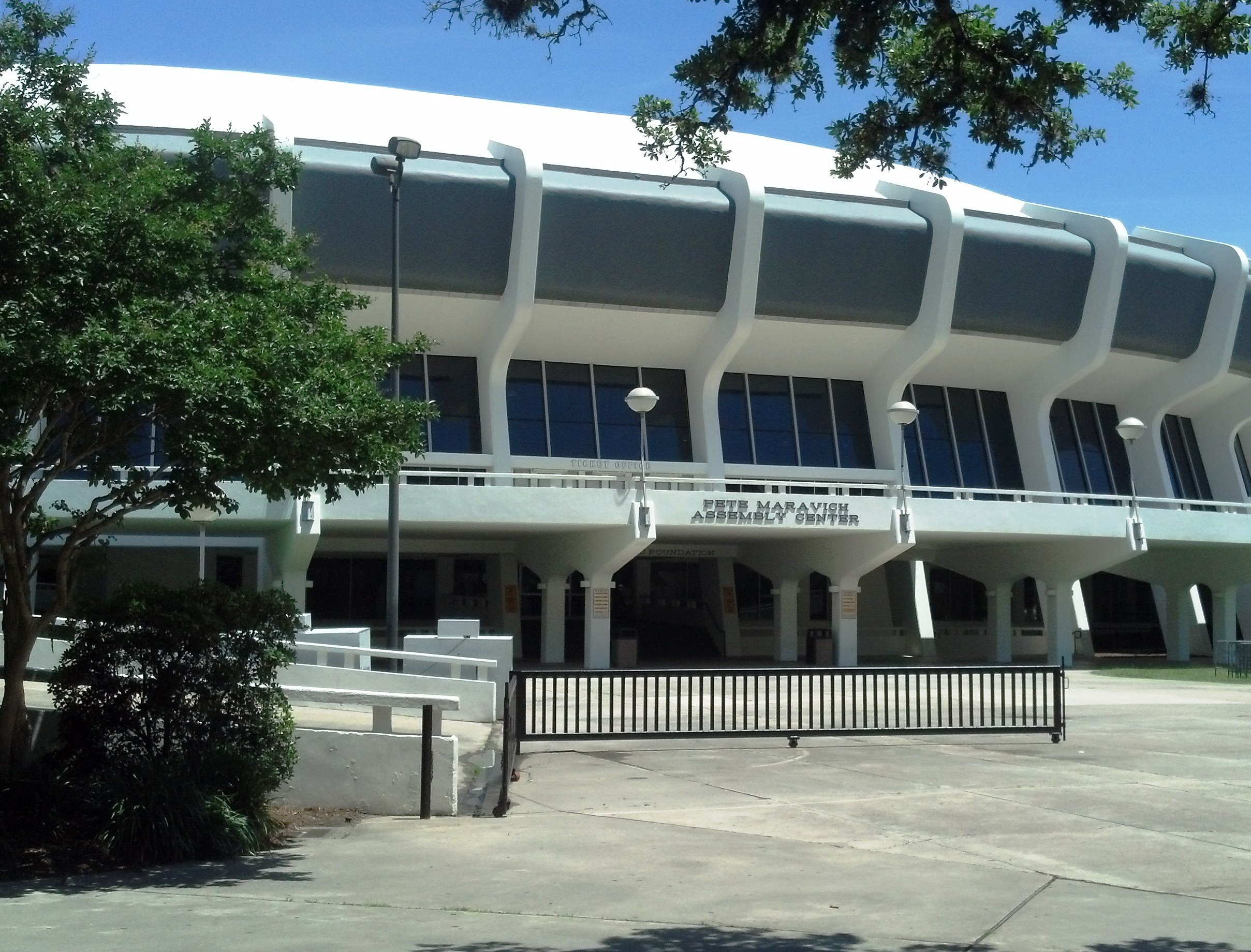
Pete Maravich Assembly Center

The Pete Maravich Assembly Center is a 13,472-seat multi-purpose arena in Baton Rouge, Louisiana. The arena opened in 1972 and is home to the LSU Tigers basketball team. It was originally known as the LSU Assembly Center, but was renamed in honor of Pete Maravich, a Tiger basketball legend, shortly after his death in 1988. The Maravich Center is known to locals as "The PMAC" or "The Palace that Pete Built", or by its more nationally known nickname, "The Deaf Dome", coined by Dick Vitale.

The slightly oval building is located directly to the north of Tiger Stadium, and its bright-white roof can be seen in many telecasts of that stadium. The arena concourse is divided into four quadrants: Pete Maravich Pass, The Walk of Champions, Heroes Hall and Midway of Memories. The quadrants highlight former LSU Tiger athletes, individual and team awards and memorabilia pertaining to the history of LSU Tigers and LSU Lady Tigers basketball teams.

=== John M. Parker Agricultural Coliseum ===
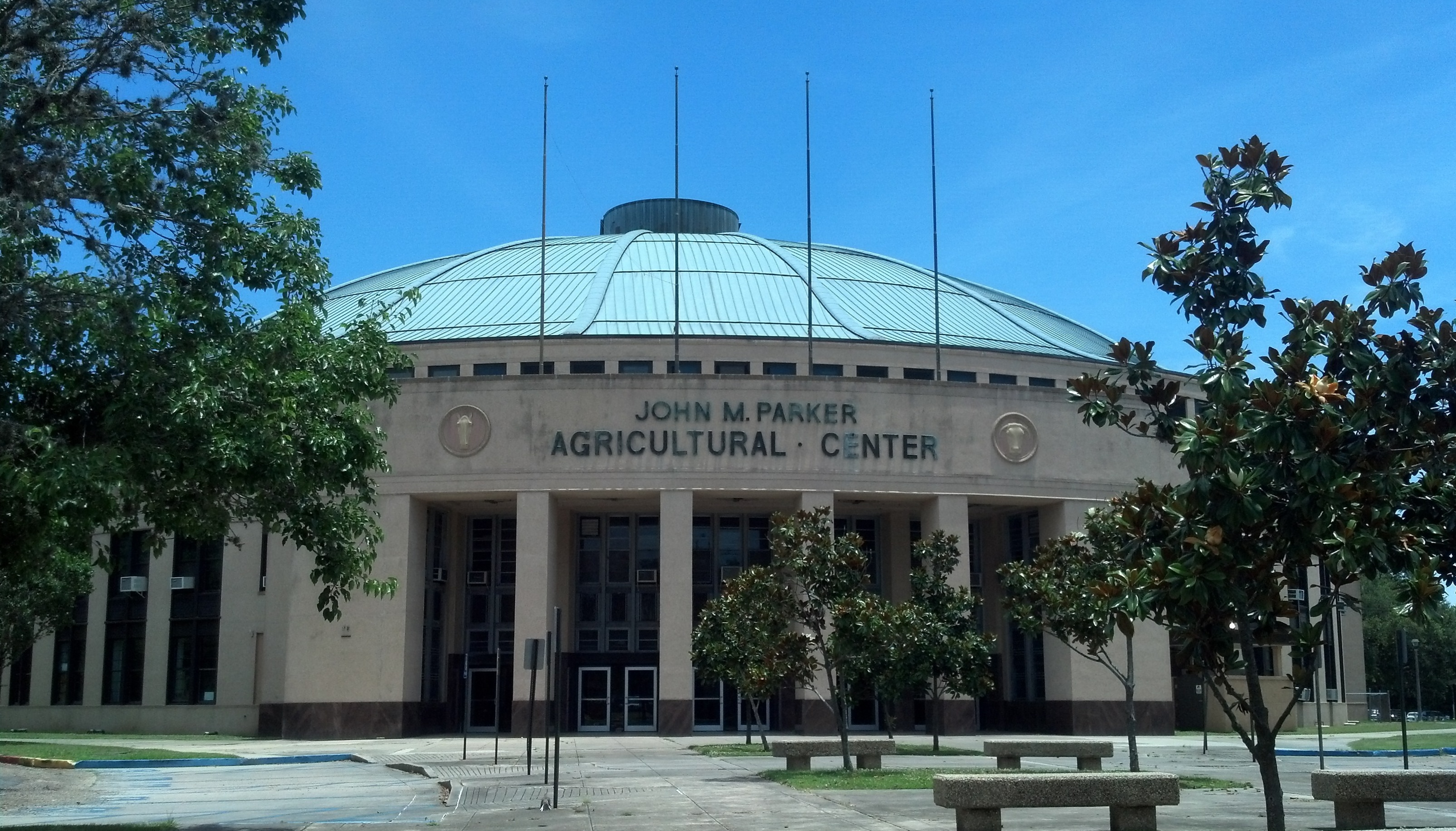
John M. Parker Agricultural Coliseum

The John M. Parker Agricultural Coliseum or John M. Parker Agricultural Center opened in 1937 and was home of the LSU Tigers Basketball team from its opening until 1971. The arena could seat 12,000 people for basketball. The Coliseum was host to the Pete Maravich-led teams of the late 1960s, and it was his prominence that led to the construction of the LSU Assembly Center which now bears his name.

=== LSU Gym/Armory ===
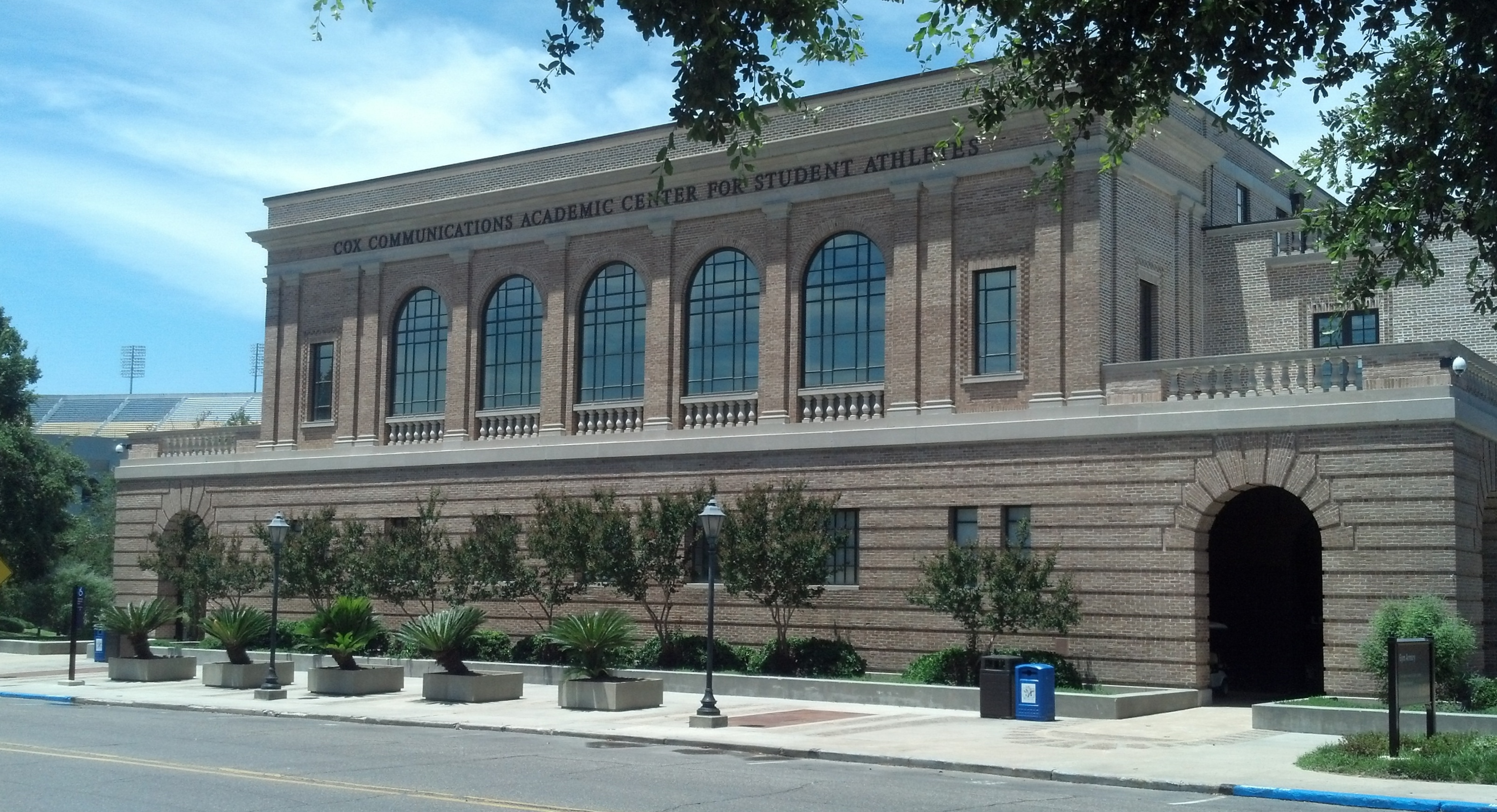
LSU Gym/Armory

The LSU Gym/Armory was completed in 1930 and was the home gymnasium of the LSU basketball team until 1937 when the John M Parker Agricultural Coliseum was completed, though for several years both the Gym/Armory and the coliseum were used for LSU's basketball games. The main floor was the gymnasium and the lower floor was the armory. Both floors were located on ground level. The gymnasium had a stage at one end and could be converted into an auditorium. When not set up as an auditorium, it provided an open space for basketball games and other events. The second floor provided space for locker rooms and a trophy room.

=== State Field ===
State Field was the home court for the LSU basketball team from 1908 to 1924. The court was located outside on a grass surface built on the old downtown campus of LSU. It was located south of the Pentagon Barracks and slightly southwest of the site of the current Louisiana State Capitol Building adjacent to the Hill Memorial Library and George Peabody Hall. The field was later moved to a site with bleachers that was north of the campuses experimental garden, and next to the old armory building. The field was known on the campus simply as the "athletic field" and was also used for LSU's baseball and football teams.

== Practice and Training facilities ==
=== LSU Basketball Practice Facility ===
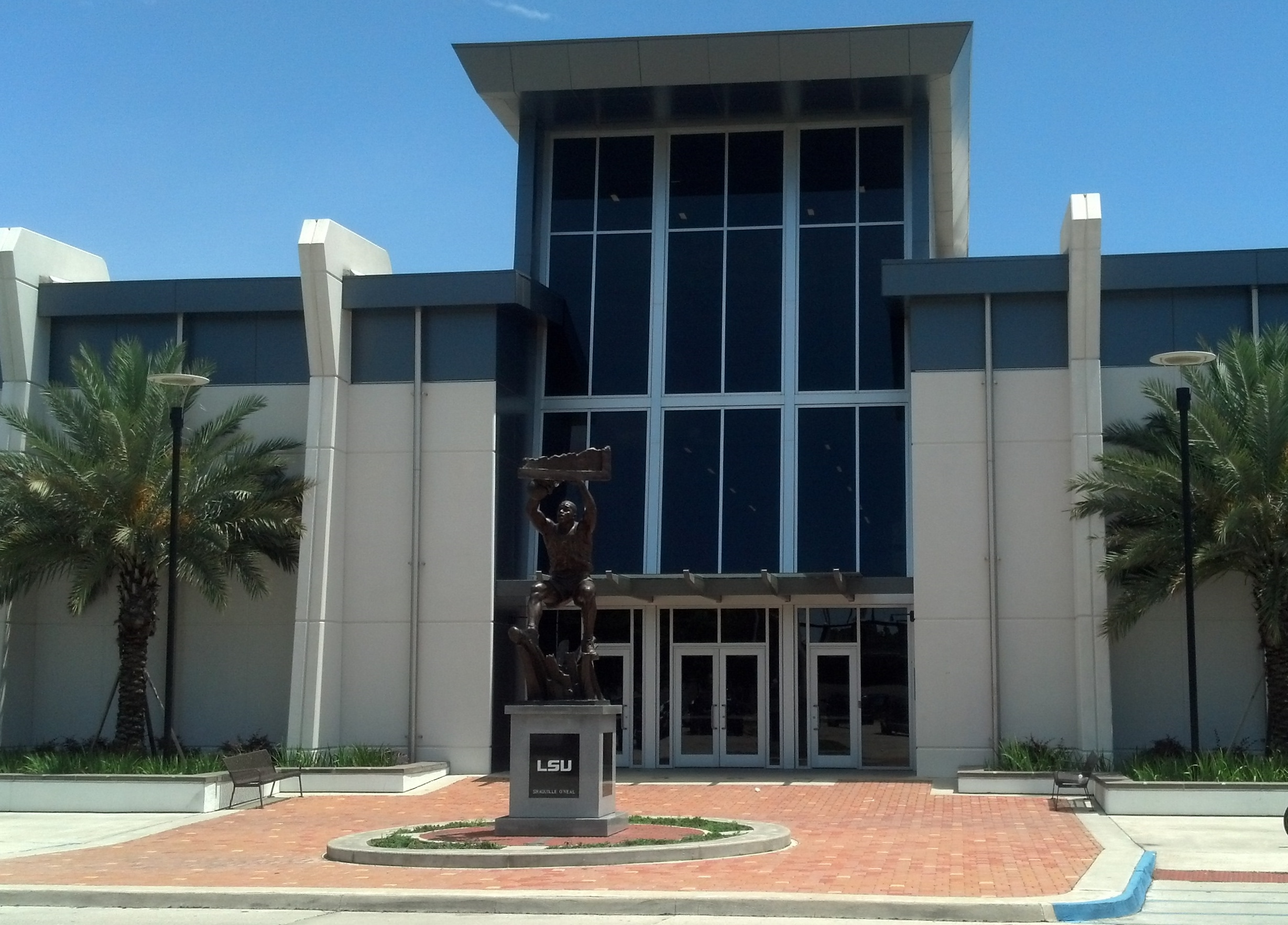
LSU Basketball Practice Facility

The LSU Basketball Practice Facility is used by the LSU Tigers basketball and LSU Lady Tigers basketball teams. The facility is connected to the Pete Maravich Assembly Center through the Northwest portal. The facility features separate, full-size duplicate gyms for the women's and men's basketball teams. They include a regulation NCAA court in length with two regulation high school courts in the opposition direction. The courts are exact replicas of the Maravich Center game court and have two portable goals and four retractable goals. The gymnasiums are equipped with a scoreboard, video filming balcony and scorer's table with video and data connection. The facility also houses team locker rooms, a team lounge, training rooms, a coach's locker room and coach's offices.

The building also includes a two-story lobby and staircase that ascends to the second level where a club room is used for pre-game and post-game events and is connected to the Pete Maravich Assembly Center concourse. The lobby includes team displays and graphics, trophy cases and memorabilia of LSU basketball. A 900-pound bronze statue of LSU legend Shaquille O'Neal is located in front of the facility.

=== LSU Strength and Conditioning facility ===
The LSU Tigers basketball strength training and conditioning facility is located in the LSU Strength and Conditioning facility. Built in 1997, it is located adjacent to Tiger Stadium. Measuring 10,000-square feet with a flat surface, it has 28 multi-purpose power stations, 36 assorted selectorized machines and 10 dumbbell stations along with a plyometric specific area, medicine balls, hurdles, plyometric boxes and assorted speed and agility equipment. It also features 2 treadmills, 4 stationary bikes, 2 elliptical cross trainers, a stepper and stepmill.

== See also ==
- List of NCAA Division I men's basketball programs
