= 1979–80 Notre Dame Fighting Irish men's basketball team =

American college basketball season

1979–80 Notre Dame Fighting Irish men's basketball

NCAA tournament, Second round loss 84–87 OT vs. Missouri
- Conference: Independent

Ranking
- Coaches: No. 11
- AP: No. 9
- Record: 22–6
- Head coach: Digger Phelps (9th season)
- Assistant coaches: Danny Nee (4th season); Scott Thompson (3rd season); Tom McLaughlin (2nd season)
- Captains: Rich Branning; Bill Hanzlik
- Home arena: Joyce Center

1979–80 NCAA Division I men's basketball independents standings
	Conf.				Overall
Team	W		L	PCT	W		L	PCT
No. 1 DePaul		–		–	26	–	2	.929
No. 19 Iona*		–		–	28	–	4	.875
Old Dominion		–		–	25	–	5	.833
No. 9 Notre Dame		–		–	23	–	8	.742
Tennessee State		–		–	19	–	7	.731
UNLV		–		–	23	–	9	.719
Saint Peter's		–		–	22	–	9	.710
Cleveland State		–		–	18	–	8	.692
James Madison		–		–	18	–	8	.692
Illinois State		–		–	20	–	9	.690
Marquette		–		–	18	–	9	.667
UNC Wilmington		–		–	19	–	10	.655
Penn State		–		–	18	–	10	.643
Southern Mississippi		–		–	17	–	10	.630
Arkansas–Little Rock		–		–	16	–	10	.615
South Carolina		–		–	16	–	11	.593
Campbell		–		–	15	–	12	.556
East Carolina		–		–	15	–	12	.556
Stetson		–		–	15	–	12	.556
Long Island		–		–	14	–	12	.538
Detroit		–		–	14	–	13	.519
Navy		–		–	14	–	13	.519
Wagner		–		–	14	–	13	.519
Siena		–		–	14	–	14	.500
Dayton		–		–	13	–	14	.481
Fairleigh Dickinson		–		–	13	–	14	.481
North Texas State		–		–	13	–	14	.481
Richmond		–		–	13	–	14	.481
Baltimore		–		–	12	–	15	.444
William & Mary		–		–	12	–	15	.444
Fordham**		–		–	12	–	16	.429
St. Francis (Pa.)		–		–	12	–	16	.429
St. Francis (N.Y.)		–		–	11	–	15	.423
Fairfield		–		–	11	–	16	.407
Army		–		–	9	–	17	.346
Milwaukee		–		–	9	–	17	.346
Towson State		–		–	9	–	17	.346
Air Force		–		–	8	–	17	.320
Valparaiso		–		–	8	–	18	.308
Catholic		–		–	8	–	19	.296
Robert Morris		–		–	7	–	19	.269
Northwestern State		–		–	5	–	20	.200
George Mason		–		–	5	–	21	.192
Portland State		–		–	5	–	21	.192
Georgia Southern		–		–	5	–	22	.185
Manhattan		–		–	4	–	22	.154
Baptist		–		–	2	–	23	.080
* –Iona's 1980 NCAA Tournament games were vacated due to NCAA sanctions; disputed record 29–5. **Disputed record 11–17. Rankings from AP Poll

The 1979–80 Notre Dame Fighting Irish men's basketball team represented the University of Notre Dame during the 1979–80 NCAA Division I men's basketball season. The team was coached by Digger Phelps and was ranked in the Associated Press poll for the entirety of the season.

== Preseason ==
The Irish were ranked fifth in the preseason AP Poll, behind Indiana, Kentucky, Duke and Ohio State. While they lost frontcourt contributors Bruce Flowers and Bill Laimbeer to graduation, they added a recruiting class ranked fourth nationally by the 1979–80 Street & Smith basketball yearbook. The class included McDonald's All-Americans Tim Andree and John Paxson and highly regarded forward Bill Varner. Key returning players were 1979 All-American Kelly Tripucka and future National Basketball Association (NBA) players Tracy Jackson, Bill Hanzlik and Orlando Woolridge. Woolridge was moved from forward to center to replace Flowers and Laimbeer. Senior point guard Rich Branning was selected co-captain of the team with Hanzlik.

Leading up to an Olympic year, Notre Dame played an exhibition game against the Soviet National Team, notching a surprising 86–76 win behind Tripucka's 35 points.

== Regular season ==
The Irish suffered an early setback as senior co-captain Hanzlik missed several games with a dislocated finger, but fared well, compiling a 6–0 record in his absence, including a marquee win against UCLA. The Irish won the contest behind clutch free throws and defense from freshman John Paxson. After the team's fast start, the Irish found themselves ranked third in the country and facing second-ranked Kentucky at Freedom Hall in Louisville. Despite the Wildcats missing starters Sam Bowie and Dirk Minniefield, the Irish lost the game 80–86. A January loss to San Francisco left the Irish on a two-game losing streak. The highlight of the Irish's season came on February 27, 1980, when they upset top-ranked DePaul 76–74 in double-overtime. The Irish were led by Kelly Tripucka's 28 points and the win was sealed by two free throws by Orlando Woolridge. The Irish were able to overcome a big scoring push by future NBA All-Stars Mark Aguirre (28 points) and Terry Cummings (16). A regular-season finale 62–54 win at Dayton raised the Irish's record to 22–5.

== Roster ==
1979–80 Notre Dame Fighting Irish men's basketball team
Players
Coaches

Pos.	#	Name	Height	Weight	Year	Hometown
C	53	Tim Andree	6 ft 10 in (2.08 m)	230 lb (104 kg)	Fr	Farmington, Michigan
G	12	Rich Branning	6 ft 3 in (1.91 m)	180 lb (82 kg)	Sr	Huntington Beach, California
G	42	Bill Hanzlik	6 ft 7 in (2.01 m)	200 lb (91 kg)	Sr	Beloit, Wisconsin
F	22	Kevin Hawkins	6 ft 5 in (1.96 m)	200 lb (91 kg)	Jr	Los Angeles, California
G	11	Tim Healy	6 ft 1 in (1.85 m)	180 lb (82 kg)	Sr	Ft. Lauderdale, Florida
F	30	Tracy Jackson	6 ft 6 in (1.98 m)	210 lb (95 kg)	Jr	Silver Spring, Maryland
G	15	Mike Mitchell	6 ft 2 in (1.88 m)	175 lb (79 kg)	So	San Bruno, California
G	23	John Paxson	6 ft 2 in (1.88 m)	180 lb (82 kg)	Fr	Kettering, Ohio
C	55	Gilbert Salinas	6 ft 11 in (2.11 m)	215 lb (98 kg)	Jr	San Antonio, Texas
F	44	Kelly Tripucka	6 ft 6 in (1.98 m)	230 lb (104 kg)	Jr	Essex Fells, New Jersey
F	34	Bill Varner	6 ft 6 in (1.98 m)	200 lb (91 kg)	Fr	New Kensington, Pennsylvania
G	24	Stan Wilcox	6 ft 3 in (1.91 m)	180 lb (82 kg)	Jr	North Babylon, New York
C	32	Orlando Woolridge	6 ft 9 in (2.06 m)	215 lb (98 kg)	Jr	Mansfield, Louisiana

Head coach

- Digger Phelps

Assistant coach(es)

- Danny Nee
- Scott Thompson
- Tom McLaughlin

Legend

- (C) Team captain
- (S) Suspended
- (I) Ineligible
- (W) Walk-on
- Injured
- Current redshirt

== NCAA tournament ==
Notre Dame was selected for the 1980 NCAA tournament and were the 4 seed in the Midwest Region, slated to play the winner of a first-round game between Missouri and San Jose State in Lincoln, Nebraska. Fifth-seeded Missouri upset the Irish 87–84 in overtime behind senior Mark Dressler's 32 points, wasting a 29-point effort by Tracy Jackson.

== Schedule ==
Date time, TV	Rank^{#}	Opponent^{#}	Result	Record	Site city, state
December 1	No. 5	Valparaiso	W 92–66	1–0	Joyce Center; Notre Dame, IN
December 3	No. 5	Iowa State	W 87–77	2–0	Joyce Center; Notre Dame, IN
December 5	No. 4	at Northwestern	W 73–56	3–0	Welsh-Ryan Arena; Evanston, Illinois
December 8	No. 4	Saint Louis	W 93–66	4–0	Joyce Center; Notre Dame, IN
December 11	No. 4	No. 7 UCLA	W 77–74	5–0	Joyce Center; Notre Dame, IN
December 13	No. 4	No. 7 (Div II) St. Joseph's (IN)	W 79–58	6–0 (0-0)	Joyce Center; Notre Dame, IN
December 22	No. 4	Fairfield	W 69–59	7–0	Joyce Center; Notre Dame, IN
December 29	No. 3	No. 2 Kentucky	L 80–86	7–1	Freedom Hall; Louisville, Kentucky
January 8	No. 7	at San Francisco	L 59–67	7–2	War Memorial Gymnasium; San Francisco, CA
January 10	No. 7	at Tulane	W 79–59	8–2	Avron B. Fogelman Arena; New Orleans, Louisiana
January 13	No. 7	at TCU	W 85–68	9–2	Hemisphere Arena; San Antonio, Texas
January 15	No. 8	Villanova	W 70–69	10–2	Joyce Center; Notre Dame, IN
January 19	No. 8	at UCLA	W 80–73	11–2	Pauley Pavilion; Los Angeles, California
January 23	No. 8	Canisius	W 84–63	12–2	Joyce Center; Notre Dame, IN
January 26	No. 8	No. 15 Maryland	W 64–63	13–2	Joyce Center; Notre Dame, IN
January 30	No. 8	at La Salle	W 64–63	13–3	Palestra; Philadelphia, Pennsylvania
February 2	No. 8	Davidson	W 105–71	14–3	Joyce Center; Notre Dame, IN
February 4	No. 8	Navy	W 67–53	15–3	Joyce Center; Notre Dame, IN
February 6	No. 9	Manhattan	W 93–49	16–3	Joyce Center; Notre Dame, IN
February 9	No. 9	North Carolina State	L 55–63	16–4	Joyce Center; Notre Dame, IN
February 11	No. 9	San Francisco	W 78–66	17–4	Joyce Center; Notre Dame, IN
February 13	No. 12	at Fordham	W 86–76	18–4	Rose Hill Gymnasium; Bronx, NY
February 16	No. 12	at South Carolina	W 90–66	19–4	Carolina Coliseum; Columbia, SC
February 20	No. 10	at Xavier	W 85–72	20–4	Riverfront Coliseum; Cincinnati, OH
February 24	No. 10	Marquette	L 74–77	20–5	Joyce Center; Notre Dame, IN
February 27	No. 14	No. 1 DePaul	W 76–74	21–5	Joyce Center; Notre Dame, IN
March 1	No. 14	at Dayton	W 62–54	22–5	UD Arena; Dayton, OH
NCAA tournament
March 8	(4) No. 9	vs. (5) No. 16 Missouri; NCAA tournament second round	L 84–87 ^{OT}	22–6	Bob Devaney Sports Center; Lincoln, NE
*Non-conference game. ^{#}Rankings from AP Poll. (#) Tournament seedings in parentheses.

== Players selected in NBA drafts ==
Year	Round	Pick	Player	NBA club
1980	1	20	Bill Hanzlik	Seattle SuperSonics
1980	4	78	Rich Branning	Indiana Pacers
1981	1	6	Orlando Woolridge	Chicago Bulls
1981	1	12	Kelly Tripucka	Detroit Pistons
1981	2	25	Tracy Jackson	Boston Celtics
1981	8	167	Gilbert Salinas	Atlanta Hawks
1983	1	19	John Paxson	San Antonio Spurs
1983	5	98	Tim Andree	Chicago Bulls
1983	9	202	Bill Varner	Milwaukee Bucks
