= 1979–80 DePaul Blue Demons men's basketball team =

American college basketball season

1979–80 DePaul Blue Demons men's basketball
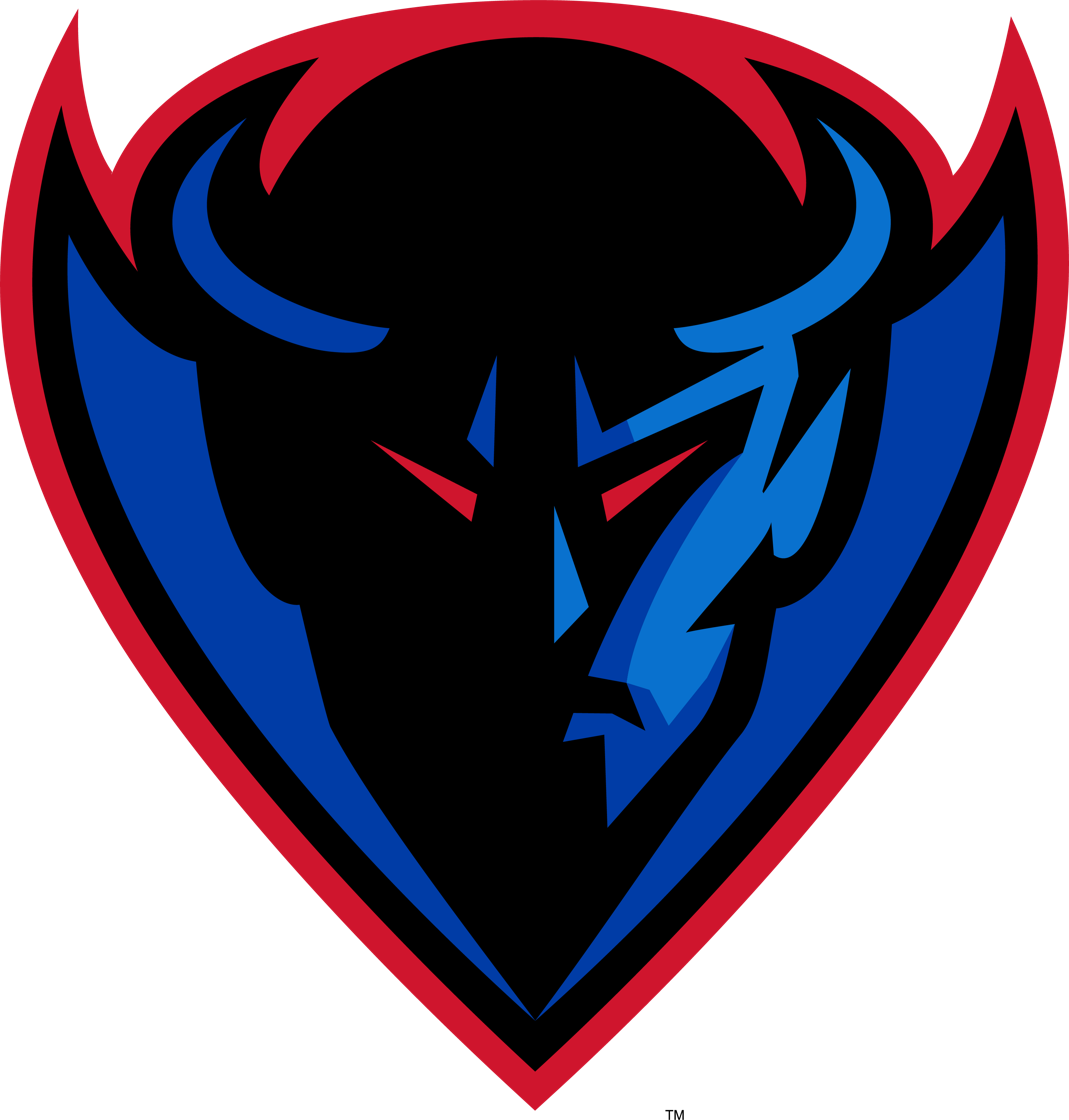

NCAA Division I regular season champions

NCAA Tournament, Second Round
- Conference: Independent

Ranking
- Coaches: No. 1
- AP: No. 1
- Record: 26–2
- Head coach: Ray Meyer (38th season)
- Assistant coaches: Joey Meyer (6th season); Jim Molinari (1st season)
- Home arena: Alumni Hall

1979–80 NCAA Division I men's basketball independents standings
	Conf.				Overall
Team	W		L	PCT	W		L	PCT
No. 1 DePaul		–		–	26	–	2	.929
No. 19 Iona*		–		–	28	–	4	.875
Old Dominion		–		–	25	–	5	.833
No. 9 Notre Dame		–		–	23	–	8	.742
Tennessee State		–		–	19	–	7	.731
UNLV		–		–	23	–	9	.719
Saint Peter's		–		–	22	–	9	.710
Cleveland State		–		–	18	–	8	.692
James Madison		–		–	18	–	8	.692
Illinois State		–		–	20	–	9	.690
Marquette		–		–	18	–	9	.667
UNC Wilmington		–		–	19	–	10	.655
Penn State		–		–	18	–	10	.643
Southern Mississippi		–		–	17	–	10	.630
Arkansas–Little Rock		–		–	16	–	10	.615
South Carolina		–		–	16	–	11	.593
Campbell		–		–	15	–	12	.556
East Carolina		–		–	15	–	12	.556
Stetson		–		–	15	–	12	.556
Long Island		–		–	14	–	12	.538
Detroit		–		–	14	–	13	.519
Navy		–		–	14	–	13	.519
Wagner		–		–	14	–	13	.519
Siena		–		–	14	–	14	.500
Dayton		–		–	13	–	14	.481
Fairleigh Dickinson		–		–	13	–	14	.481
North Texas State		–		–	13	–	14	.481
Richmond		–		–	13	–	14	.481
Baltimore		–		–	12	–	15	.444
William & Mary		–		–	12	–	15	.444
Fordham**		–		–	12	–	16	.429
St. Francis (Pa.)		–		–	12	–	16	.429
St. Francis (N.Y.)		–		–	11	–	15	.423
Fairfield		–		–	11	–	16	.407
Army		–		–	9	–	17	.346
Milwaukee		–		–	9	–	17	.346
Towson State		–		–	9	–	17	.346
Air Force		–		–	8	–	17	.320
Valparaiso		–		–	8	–	18	.308
Catholic		–		–	8	–	19	.296
Robert Morris		–		–	7	–	19	.269
Northwestern State		–		–	5	–	20	.200
George Mason		–		–	5	–	21	.192
Portland State		–		–	5	–	21	.192
Georgia Southern		–		–	5	–	22	.185
Manhattan		–		–	4	–	22	.154
Baptist		–		–	2	–	23	.080
* –Iona's 1980 NCAA Tournament games were vacated due to NCAA sanctions; disputed record 29–5. **Disputed record 11–17. Rankings from AP Poll

The 1979–80 DePaul Blue Demons men's basketball team represented DePaul University during the 1979–80 NCAA Division I men's basketball season. They were led by head coach Ray Meyer, in his 38th season, and played their home games at the Alumni Hall in Chicago. In the 1980 NCAA Tournament the Blue Demons were a #1 seed but were upset in the second round by UCLA 77–71.

== Roster ==
1979–80 DePaul Blue Demons men's basketball team
Players
Coaches

Pos.	#	Name	Height	Weight	Year	Previous school	Hometown
F/C	11	James Mitchem	6 ft 9 in (2.06 m)	215 lb (98 kg)	Sr	St. Pius X	Albuquerque, NM
F	21	Dennis McGuire	6 ft 8 in (2.03 m)	195 lb (88 kg)	Jr	Holy Cross	River Grove, Illinois
G	23	Clyde Bradshaw	6 ft 0 in (1.83 m)	170 lb (77 kg)	Jr	East Orange	East Orange, NJ
F	24	Mark Aguirre	6 ft 7 in (2.01 m)	225 lb (102 kg)	So	Westinghouse	Chicago, IL
F	32	Terry Cummings	6 ft 9 in (2.06 m)	220 lb (100 kg)	Fr	Carver	Chicago, IL
G	44	Skip Dillard	6 ft 3 in (1.91 m)	200 lb (91 kg)	So	Westinghouse	Chicago, IL

Head coach

- Ray Meyer

Assistant coach(es)

- Joey Meyer
- Jim Molinari

Legend

- (C) Team captain
- (S) Suspended
- (I) Ineligible
- (W) Walk-on
- Injured
- Current redshirt

Roster

== Schedule ==
Date time, TV	Rank^{#}	Opponent^{#}	Result	Record	Site city, state
Regular season
December 5 ESPN	No. 10	Wisconsin	W 90–77	1–0	Alumni Hall (5,308); Chicago, Illinois
December 10	No. 11	Texas	W 66–60	2–0	Alumni Hall (5,308); Chicago, Illinois
December 12	No. 11	at Northern Illinois	W 57–55	3–0	Chick Evans Field House (6,076); DeKalb, Illinois
December 15	No. 11	at No. 7 UCLA	W 99–94	4–0	Pauley Pavilion (12,072); Los Angeles, California
December 19	No. 6	at Eastern Michigan	W 57–55	5–0	Bowen Field House (4,600); Ypsilanti, Michigan
December 21	No. 6	at Northwestern	W 81–75	6–0	Welsh-Ryan Arena (5,913); Evanston, Illinois
December 22	No. 6	vs. Loyola (IL)	W 92–83	7–0	Welsh-Ryan Arena (8,263); Evanston, Illinois
December 29	No. 4	Bradley	W 68–61	8–0	Alumni Hall (5,308); Chicago, Illinois
January 2	No. 3	at No. 12 Missouri	W 92–79	9–0	Hearnes Center (9,500); Columbia, Missouri
January 5	No. 3	at Loyola (IL)	W 80–75	10–0	Alumni Gym (3,291); Chicago, Illinois
January 7	No. 2	Ball State	W 96–79	11–0	Alumni Hall (5,308); Chicago, Illinois
January 12	No. 2	at Marquette	W 92–85	12–0	MECCA Arena (10,938); Milwaukee, Wisconsin
January 15	No. 1	Lamar	W 61–59	13–0	Alumni Hall (5,308); Chicago, Illinois
January 18	No. 1	Maine	W 93–79	14–0	Alumni Hall (5,308); Chicago, Illinois
January 20	No. 1	No. 14 LSU	W 78–73	15–0	Alumni Hall (5,308); Chicago, Illinois
January 22	No. 1	at Alabama-Birmingham	W 57–54	16–0	Birmingham-Jefferson Civic Center (17,309); Birmingham, Alabama
January 26	No. 1	Evansville	W 105–94	17–0	Alumni Hall (5,308); Chicago, Illinois
January 28	No. 1	at Creighton	W 84–73	18–0	Omaha Civic Auditorium (10,000); Omaha, Nebraska
February 2	No. 1	North Texas	W 102–71	19–0	Alumni Hall (5,308); Chicago, Illinois
February 9	No. 1	Dayton	W 65–63	20–0	Alumni Hall (5,308); Chicago, Illinois
February 13	No. 1	at Valparaiso	W 95–71	21–0	Hilltop Gym (4,300); Valparaiso, Indiana
February 16	No. 1	Butler	W 103–79	22–0	Alumni Hall (5,308); Chicago, Illinois
February 18	No. 1	La Salle	W 92–75	23–0	Alumni Hall (5,308); Chicago, Illinois
February 21	No. 1	at Wagner	W 105–89	24–0	Madison Square Garden (18,000); New York
February 23	No. 1	Loyola (IL)	W 94–87	25–0	Alumni Hall (5,308); Chicago, Illinois
February 27	No. 1	at No. 14 Notre Dame	L 74–76 ^{2OT}	25–1	Joyce Center (11,345); South Bend, Indiana
March 1	No. 1	Illinois State	W 97–81	26–1	Alumni Hall (5,308); Chicago, Illinois
NCAA Tournament
March 9	(1 W) No. 1	vs. (8 W) UCLA; Second Round	L 71–77	26–2	ASU Activity Center (11,000); Tempe, Arizona
*Non-conference game. ^{#}Rankings from AP Poll. (#) Tournament seedings in parentheses.

== Rankings ==
Ranking movements Legend: ██ Increase in ranking ██ Decrease in ranking т = Tied with team above or below
	Week														
Poll	Pre	1	2	3	4	5	6	7	8	9	10	11	12	13	Final
AP	9	10	11	6	4	3	2	1	1	1	1	1	1	1	1
Coaches	9т	10	10	7т	5	3	2	1	1	1	1	1	1	1	1
