= 1979–80 Illinois State Redbirds men's basketball team =

American college basketball season

1979–80 Illinois State Redbirds men's basketball

Illinois State Holiday Festival champion

NIT, First Round
- Conference: Independent
- Record: 20–9
- Head coach: Bob Donewald (2nd season)
- Assistant coaches: Jim Platt; Sam Skarich; Terry Smith
- Home arena: Horton Field House

1979–80 NCAA Division I men's basketball independents standings
	Conf.				Overall
Team	W		L	PCT	W		L	PCT
No. 1 DePaul		–		–	26	–	2	.929
No. 19 Iona*		–		–	28	–	4	.875
Old Dominion		–		–	25	–	5	.833
No. 9 Notre Dame		–		–	23	–	8	.742
Tennessee State		–		–	19	–	7	.731
UNLV		–		–	23	–	9	.719
Saint Peter's		–		–	22	–	9	.710
Cleveland State		–		–	18	–	8	.692
James Madison		–		–	18	–	8	.692
Illinois State		–		–	20	–	9	.690
Marquette		–		–	18	–	9	.667
UNC Wilmington		–		–	19	–	10	.655
Penn State		–		–	18	–	10	.643
Southern Mississippi		–		–	17	–	10	.630
Arkansas–Little Rock		–		–	16	–	10	.615
South Carolina		–		–	16	–	11	.593
Campbell		–		–	15	–	12	.556
East Carolina		–		–	15	–	12	.556
Stetson		–		–	15	–	12	.556
Long Island		–		–	14	–	12	.538
Detroit		–		–	14	–	13	.519
Navy		–		–	14	–	13	.519
Wagner		–		–	14	–	13	.519
Siena		–		–	14	–	14	.500
Dayton		–		–	13	–	14	.481
Fairleigh Dickinson		–		–	13	–	14	.481
North Texas State		–		–	13	–	14	.481
Richmond		–		–	13	–	14	.481
Baltimore		–		–	12	–	15	.444
William & Mary		–		–	12	–	15	.444
Fordham**		–		–	12	–	16	.429
St. Francis (Pa.)		–		–	12	–	16	.429
St. Francis (N.Y.)		–		–	11	–	15	.423
Fairfield		–		–	11	–	16	.407
Army		–		–	9	–	17	.346
Milwaukee		–		–	9	–	17	.346
Towson State		–		–	9	–	17	.346
Air Force		–		–	8	–	17	.320
Valparaiso		–		–	8	–	18	.308
Catholic		–		–	8	–	19	.296
Robert Morris		–		–	7	–	19	.269
Northwestern State		–		–	5	–	20	.200
George Mason		–		–	5	–	21	.192
Portland State		–		–	5	–	21	.192
Georgia Southern		–		–	5	–	22	.185
Manhattan		–		–	4	–	22	.154
Baptist		–		–	2	–	23	.080
* –Iona's 1980 NCAA Tournament games were vacated due to NCAA sanctions; disputed record 29–5. **Disputed record 11–17. Rankings from AP Poll

The 1979–80 Illinois State Redbirds men's basketball team represented Illinois State University during the 1979–80 NCAA Division I men's basketball season. The Redbirds, led by second year head coach Bob Donewald, played their home games at Horton Field House and competed as an independent (not a member of a conference). They finished the season 20–9.

The Redbirds received an invitation to the 1980 National Invitation Tournament. They defeated West Texas State University in the first round and were beaten by the University of Illinois in the second round.

== Roster ==
1979–80 Illinois State Redbirds men's basketball team
Players
Coaches

Pos.	#	Name	Height	Weight	Year	Hometown
C	32	Joe Galvin	7 ft 0 in (2.13 m)	218 lb (99 kg)	Sr	Bloomington, IL
G	13	Ron Jones	6 ft 5 in (1.96 m)	176 lb (80 kg)	Sr	Venice, IL
F	11	Del Yarbrough	6 ft 8 in (2.03 m)	220 lb (100 kg)	Sr	North Chicago, IL
C	35	Roy Herold	6 ft 8 in (2.03 m)	212 lb (96 kg)	Jr	Helsinki, Finland
F	25	Anthony Jones	6 ft 6 in (1.98 m)	190 lb (86 kg)	Jr	Chicago, IL
G	15	Dave Nussbaumer	6 ft 0 in (1.83 m)	175 lb (79 kg)	Jr	McLean, VA
G	24	McKay Smith	6 ft 6 in (1.98 m)	175 lb (79 kg)	Jr	Springfield, IL
G	42	George Carter (redshirt)	6 ft 3 in (1.91 m)	180 lb (82 kg)	So	Middletown, OH
F	33	Joe Richardson	6 ft 6 in (1.98 m)	190 lb (86 kg)	So	Indianapolis, IN
G	23	Dale White	6 ft 5 in (1.96 m)	190 lb (86 kg)	So	Covington, IN
C	31	Tyrone Brewer	6 ft 8 in (2.03 m)	220 lb (100 kg)	Fr	Westchester, IL
F	41	Mark Herron	6 ft 8 in (2.03 m)	200 lb (91 kg)	Fr	South Bend, IN
F	44	Rick Lamb	6 ft 8 in (2.03 m)	230 lb (104 kg)	Fr	Illiopolis, IL
G		James Lowery (W)	5 ft 11 in (1.8 m)	—	Fr	Fort Wayne, IN
F	30	Raynard Malaine	6 ft 6 in (1.98 m)	218 lb (99 kg)	Fr	Gary, IN
G	21	Dwayne Tyus	6 ft 2 in (1.88 m)	175 lb (79 kg)	Fr	Chicago, IL

Head coach

- Bob Donewald (Hanover)

Assistant coach(es)

- Jim Platt (Concordia–Chicago)
- Sam Skarich (Notre Dame)
- Terry Smith (Marian (IN))

Legend

- (C) Team captain
- (S) Suspended
- (I) Ineligible
- (W) Walk-on
- Injured
- Current redshirt

== Schedule ==
Date time, TV	Rank^{#}	Opponent^{#}	Result	Record	High points	High rebounds	High assists	Site (attendance) city, state
Exhibition Season
November 19, 1979		Guadalajara	W 86–52		18 – Yarbrough	8 – A.Jones	–	Horton Field House (2,711); Normal, IL
Regular Season
November 30, 1979; 10:00 pm		at Southern California	L 61–63	0–1	15 – Yarbrough	11 – Galvin	–	Los Angeles Memorial Sports Arena (5,331); Los Angeles, CA
December 3, 1979; 7:30 pm		Western Kentucky	W 66–55	1–1	20 – R.Jones	9 – Yarbrough	–	Horton Field House (4,669); Normal, IL
December 7, 1979; 8:00 pm		vs. Hofstra; Carrier Classic [Semifinal]	W 71–66	2–1	20 – Yarbrough	9 – Yarbrough	–	Manley Field House (6,627); Syracuse, NY
December 8, 1979; 8:00 pm		at No. 11 Syracuse; Carrier Classic [Final]	L 70–72 ^{OT}	2–2	18 – R.Jones	11 – Yarbrough	–	Manley Field House (8,256); Syracuse, NY
December 10, 1979; 7:30 pm		Indiana State	W 66–58	3–2	20 – R.Jones	10 – Galvin, Lamb	–	Horton Field House (6,407); Normal, IL
December 14, 1979; 9:05 pm		vs. Eastern Illinois; Illini Classic [Semifinal]	W 64–59	4–2	15 – R.Jones	8 – Yarbrough	–	Assembly Hall (14,363); Champaign, IL
December 15, 1979		at Illinois; Illini Classic [Final]	L 40–47	4–3	18 – R.Jones	8 – A.Jones	5 – Nussbaumer	Assembly Hall (16,257); Champaign, IL
December 18, 1979; 7:30 pm		Mississippi Valley State	W 64–56	5–3	23 – Yarbrough	8 – Yarbrough, A.Jones	–	Horton Field House (2,879); Normal, IL
December 21, 1979		U. S. International; Illinois State Holiday Festival [Semifinal]	W 76–63	6–3	20 – R.Jones	5 – A.Jones	–	Horton Field House (2,013); Normal, IL
December 22, 1979		Lamar; Illinois State Holiday Festival [Final]	W 96–64	7–3	31 – R.Jones	8 – Lamb	–	Horton Field House (3,117); Normal, IL
December 29, 1979; 2:30 pm		Charleston	W 83–61	8–3	19 – Yarbrough	10 – Yarbrough	–	Horton Field House (1,800); Normal, IL
January 3, 1980; WEEK		at Bradley	L 57–62	8–4	16 – R.Jones	12 – Yarbrough	–	Robertson Memorial Field House (7,300); Peoria, IL
January 8, 1980; 7:30 pm		Westmont	W 52–44	9–4	–	–	–	Horton Field House (1,767); Normal, IL
January 12, 1980; 2:30 pm		Detroit	W 64–62	10–4	15 – Yarbrough	11 – Malaine	–	Horton Field House (5,108); Normal, IL
January 17, 1980; 7:30 pm		Loyola–Chicago	W 72–64	11–4	23 – R.Jones	–	–	Horton Field House (7,053); Normal, IL
January 19, 1980; 2:30 pm		Centenary	W 72–51	12–4	20 – R.Jones	7 – R.Jones	–	Horton Field House (5,213); Normal, IL
January 21, 1980; 7:30 pm		McNeese State	W 55–53	13–4	12 – R.Jones	–	–	Horton Field House (4,322); Normal, IL
January 25, 1980; 7:00 pm		at Howard	W 72–61	14–4	16 – R.Jones	10 – R.Jones	–	Burr Gymnasium (2,700); Washington, DC
January 28, 1980; 7:30 pm		Northeast Louisiana	W 68–65	15–4	–	–	–	Horton Field House (4,388); Normal, IL
January 31, 1980; 8:00 pm		at Pan American	L 58–62	15–5	16 – R.Jones	11 – Yarbrough	–	PAU Fieldhouse (5,400); Edinburg, TX
February 2, 1980; 7:30 pm		at Centenary	W 74–59	16–5	28 – R.Jones	6 – A.Jones	–	Gold Dome (1,879); Shreveport, LA
February 9, 1980; 7:30 pm		at East Carolina	L 67–70 ^{OT}	16–6	19 – Galvin	16 – Galvin	–	Williams Arena at Minges Coliseum (4,200); Greenville, NC
February 11, 1980; 7:30 pm		Northern Illinois	L 62–65 ^{OT}	16–7	13 – R.Jones	12 – Yarbrough	–	Horton Field House (5,388); Normal, IL
February 16, 1980; 3:00 pm		at Wisconsin–Milwaukee	W 87–73	17–7	22 – R.Jones	–	–	Klotsche Center (425); Milwaukee, WI
February 18, 1980; 7:30 pm		Northern Iowa	W 77–56	18–7	22 – R.Jones	8 – Lamb	–	Horton Field House (3,657); Normal, IL
February 23, 1980; 2:30 pm		Oral Roberts	W 66–65	19–7	18 – Yarbrough	14 – Yarbrough	–	Horton Field House (7,213); Normal, IL
March 1, 1980; 7:30 pm, ESPN		at No. 1 DePaul	L 81–97	19–8	31 – Yarbrough	15 – Yarbrough	–	Alumni Hall (5,308); Chicago, IL
National Invitation {NIT} Tournament
March 5, 1980; 7:30 pm		West Texas State; First Round	W 80–63	20–8	22 – R.Jones	13 – Yarbrough	5 – R.Jones, Malaine	Horton Field House (4,285); Normal, IL
March 10, 1980; 7:05 pm		at Illinois; Second Round	L 65–75	20–9	23 – Yarbrough	11 – Yarbrough	10 – Nussbaumer	Assembly Hall (16,193); Champaign, IL
*Non-conference game. ^{#}Rankings from AP Poll. (#) Tournament seedings in parentheses. All times are in Central Standard Time.
