= 1979–80 Marquette Warriors men's basketball team =

American college basketball season

1979–80 Marquette Warriors men's basketball

NCAA Tournament, First Round, L 59–77 vs. Villanova
- Conference: Independent

Ranking
- AP: No. 9
- Record: 18–9
- Head coach: Hank Raymonds (3rd season)
- Home arena: MECCA Arena

1979–80 NCAA Division I men's basketball independents standings
	Conf.				Overall
Team	W		L	PCT	W		L	PCT
No. 1 DePaul		–		–	26	–	2	.929
No. 19 Iona*		–		–	28	–	4	.875
Old Dominion		–		–	25	–	5	.833
No. 9 Notre Dame		–		–	23	–	8	.742
Tennessee State		–		–	19	–	7	.731
UNLV		–		–	23	–	9	.719
Saint Peter's		–		–	22	–	9	.710
Cleveland State		–		–	18	–	8	.692
James Madison		–		–	18	–	8	.692
Illinois State		–		–	20	–	9	.690
Marquette		–		–	18	–	9	.667
UNC Wilmington		–		–	19	–	10	.655
Penn State		–		–	18	–	10	.643
Southern Mississippi		–		–	17	–	10	.630
Arkansas–Little Rock		–		–	16	–	10	.615
South Carolina		–		–	16	–	11	.593
Campbell		–		–	15	–	12	.556
East Carolina		–		–	15	–	12	.556
Stetson		–		–	15	–	12	.556
Long Island		–		–	14	–	12	.538
Detroit		–		–	14	–	13	.519
Navy		–		–	14	–	13	.519
Wagner		–		–	14	–	13	.519
Siena		–		–	14	–	14	.500
Dayton		–		–	13	–	14	.481
Fairleigh Dickinson		–		–	13	–	14	.481
North Texas State		–		–	13	–	14	.481
Richmond		–		–	13	–	14	.481
Baltimore		–		–	12	–	15	.444
William & Mary		–		–	12	–	15	.444
Fordham**		–		–	12	–	16	.429
St. Francis (Pa.)		–		–	12	–	16	.429
St. Francis (N.Y.)		–		–	11	–	15	.423
Fairfield		–		–	11	–	16	.407
Army		–		–	9	–	17	.346
Milwaukee		–		–	9	–	17	.346
Towson State		–		–	9	–	17	.346
Air Force		–		–	8	–	17	.320
Valparaiso		–		–	8	–	18	.308
Catholic		–		–	8	–	19	.296
Robert Morris		–		–	7	–	19	.269
Northwestern State		–		–	5	–	20	.200
George Mason		–		–	5	–	21	.192
Portland State		–		–	5	–	21	.192
Georgia Southern		–		–	5	–	22	.185
Manhattan		–		–	4	–	22	.154
Baptist		–		–	2	–	23	.080
* –Iona's 1980 NCAA Tournament games were vacated due to NCAA sanctions; disputed record 29–5. **Disputed record 11–17. Rankings from AP Poll

The 1979–80 Marquette Warriors men's basketball team represented the Marquette University in the 1979–80 season. The Warriors finished the regular season with a record of 17–8. The Warriors would receive an at-large bid into the NCAA Tournament where they would fall in the first round to Villanova.

== Roster ==
1979–80 Marquette Warriors men's basketball team
Players
Coaches

Pos.	#	Name	Height	Weight	Year	Hometown
F	43	Robert Byrd	6 ft 6 in (1.98 m)	185 lb (84 kg)	Sr	Chicago, Illinois
G	10	Tony Davis	6 ft 2 in (1.88 m)	170 lb (77 kg)	RS Jr	Argo, Illinois
G	21	Artie Green	6 ft 1 in (1.85 m)	180 lb (82 kg)	Jr	Bronx, New York
G	22	Larry Hatchett	6 ft 2 in (1.88 m)	175 lb (79 kg)	Jr	Aurora, Illinois
F	0	Oliver Lee	6 ft 6 in (1.98 m)	195 lb (88 kg)	Jr	DeLand, Florida
C	45	Dean Marquardt	6 ft 9 in (2.06 m)	215 lb (98 kg)	So	Milwaukee, Wisconsin
F	40	Mike McGonigle	6 ft 5 in (1.96 m)	193 lb (88 kg)	Fr	New Castle, Pennsylvania
F	33	Terrell Schlundt	6 ft 7 in (2.01 m)	205 lb (93 kg)	Fr	Antigo, Wisconsin
F	30	Greg Shimon	6 ft 5 in (1.96 m)	185 lb (84 kg)	RS So	Brookfield, Wisconsin
G	23	Mike Wilson	6 ft 3 in (1.91 m)	175 lb (79 kg)	So	Memphis, Tennessee
F	42	Mark Worgull	6 ft 4 in (1.93 m)	180 lb (82 kg)	Fr	Pewaukee, Wisconsin
F	31	Sam Worthen	6 ft 5 in (1.96 m)	194 lb (88 kg)	Sr	Brooklyn, New York

Head coach

- Hank Raymonds

Assistant coach(es)

- Rick Majerus
- Gerald Oliver

Legend

- (C) Team captain
- (S) Suspended
- (I) Ineligible
- (W) Walk-on
- Injured
- Current redshirt

== Schedule ==
Date time, TV	Rank^{#}	Opponent^{#}	Result	Record	Site city, state
Regular season
December 4		Fresno State	W 57–54	1–0	MECCA Arena; Milwaukee, WI
December 8		Michigan	L 60–63	1–1	MECCA Arena; Milwaukee, WI
December 15		Wisconsin	L 56–57	1–2	MECCA Arena; Milwaukee, WI
December 22		at Illinois	W 80–78	2–2	Assembly Hall (12,618); Champaign, Illinois
December 28		Saint Mary's	W 100–74	3–2	MECCA Arena; Milwaukee, WI
December 29		Rhode Island	L 57–64	3–3	MECCA Arena; Milwaukee, WI
January 2		Cleveland State	W 93–69	4–3	MECCA Arena; Milwaukee, WI
January 4		Brown	W 80–49	5–3	MECCA Arena; Milwaukee, WI
January 7		at Long Beach State	L 69–77	5–4	Long Beach Arena
January 12		No. 2 DePaul	L 85–92	5–5	MECCA Arena (10,938); Milwaukee, WI
January 15		Maine	W 87–77	6–5	MECCA Arena; Milwaukee, WI
January 17		at Xavier	W 75–62	7–5	Riverfront Coliseum; Cincinnati, OH
January 19		Florida State	W 74–64	8–5	MECCA Arena; Milwaukee, WI
January 22		at Louisville	L 63–76	8–6	Freedom Hall; Louisville, Kentucky
January 26		at South Carolina	W 80–65	9–6	Carolina Coliseum; Columbia, SC
February 2		at Oral Roberts	L 101–102	9–7	Mabee Center
February 5		Creighton	W 81–71	10–7	MECCA Arena; Milwaukee, Wisconsin
February 7		at Loyola	W 90–84	11–7	Alumni Gym
February 10		vs. No. 10 Duke	W 80–77	12–7	Alliant Energy Center; Dane County, WI
February 12		Xavier	W 82–70	13–7	MECCA Arena; Milwaukee, WI
February 16		Daytona	W 73–64	14–7	MECCA Arena; Milwaukee, WI
February 20		at Stetson	L 72–77	14–8	Edmunds Center
February 24		at No. 10 Notre Dame	W 77–74	15–8	Joyce Center; South Bend, Indiana
February 27		at Detroit	W 80–76	16–8	Calihan Hall; Detroit, Michigan
February 29		Air Force	W 70–50	17–8	MECCA Arena; Milwaukee, WI
NCAA Tournament
March 7	(9 E)	vs. (8 E) Villanova; First Round	L 59–77	17–9	Providence Civic Center; Providence, RI
*Non-conference game. ^{#}Rankings from AP Poll. (#) Tournament seedings in parentheses. E=East.

== Team players drafted into the NBA ==
Round	Pick	Player	NBA club
2	26	Sam Worthen	Chicago Bulls
7	142	Robert Byrd	Chicago Bulls
