= 1979–80 Penn State Nittany Lions basketball team =

American college basketball season

1979–80 Penn State Nittany Lions men's basketball

NIT, First Round, L 49–53 vs. Alabama
- Conference: Independent
- Record: 18–10
- Head coach: Dick Harter (2nd season)
- Assistant coach: Perry Clark (2nd season)
- Home arena: Rec Hall

1979–80 NCAA Division I men's basketball independents standings
	Conf.				Overall
Team	W		L	PCT	W		L	PCT
No. 1 DePaul		–		–	26	–	2	.929
No. 19 Iona*		–		–	28	–	4	.875
Old Dominion		–		–	25	–	5	.833
No. 9 Notre Dame		–		–	23	–	8	.742
Tennessee State		–		–	19	–	7	.731
UNLV		–		–	23	–	9	.719
Saint Peter's		–		–	22	–	9	.710
Cleveland State		–		–	18	–	8	.692
James Madison		–		–	18	–	8	.692
Illinois State		–		–	20	–	9	.690
Marquette		–		–	18	–	9	.667
UNC Wilmington		–		–	19	–	10	.655
Penn State		–		–	18	–	10	.643
Southern Mississippi		–		–	17	–	10	.630
Arkansas–Little Rock		–		–	16	–	10	.615
South Carolina		–		–	16	–	11	.593
Campbell		–		–	15	–	12	.556
East Carolina		–		–	15	–	12	.556
Stetson		–		–	15	–	12	.556
Long Island		–		–	14	–	12	.538
Detroit		–		–	14	–	13	.519
Navy		–		–	14	–	13	.519
Wagner		–		–	14	–	13	.519
Siena		–		–	14	–	14	.500
Dayton		–		–	13	–	14	.481
Fairleigh Dickinson		–		–	13	–	14	.481
North Texas State		–		–	13	–	14	.481
Richmond		–		–	13	–	14	.481
Baltimore		–		–	12	–	15	.444
William & Mary		–		–	12	–	15	.444
Fordham**		–		–	12	–	16	.429
St. Francis (Pa.)		–		–	12	–	16	.429
St. Francis (N.Y.)		–		–	11	–	15	.423
Fairfield		–		–	11	–	16	.407
Army		–		–	9	–	17	.346
Milwaukee		–		–	9	–	17	.346
Towson State		–		–	9	–	17	.346
Air Force		–		–	8	–	17	.320
Valparaiso		–		–	8	–	18	.308
Catholic		–		–	8	–	19	.296
Robert Morris		–		–	7	–	19	.269
Northwestern State		–		–	5	–	20	.200
George Mason		–		–	5	–	21	.192
Portland State		–		–	5	–	21	.192
Georgia Southern		–		–	5	–	22	.185
Manhattan		–		–	4	–	22	.154
Baptist		–		–	2	–	23	.080
* –Iona's 1980 NCAA Tournament games were vacated due to NCAA sanctions; disputed record 29–5. **Disputed record 11–17. Rankings from AP Poll

The 1979–80 Penn State Nittany Lions basketball team represented Pennsylvania State University in the 1979–80 season.

== Roster ==
1979–80 Penn State Nittany Lions men's basketball team
Players
Coaches

Pos.	#	Name	Height	Weight	Year	Hometown
F	43	Frank Brickowski	6 ft 9 in (2.06 m)	232 lb (105 kg)	Jr	Bayville, New York
G	12	Craig Buffie	6 ft 3 in (1.91 m)	185 lb (84 kg)	So	Bloomington, Indiana
G	25	Will Diehl	6 ft 1 in (1.85 m)	165 lb (75 kg)	Jr	Pittsburgh, Pennsylvania
G	10	Mike Edelman	6 ft 2 in (1.88 m)	180 lb (82 kg)	So	Havertown, Pennsylvania
F	44	Rich Fetter	6 ft 7 in (2.01 m)	215 lb (98 kg)	Fr	Riverton, Illinois
F	14	Bruce Hegedus	6 ft 3 in (1.91 m)	185 lb (84 kg)	Fr	Glen Mills, Pennsylvania
F/C	45	Gary Korkowski	6 ft 8 in (2.03 m)	225 lb (102 kg)	Sr	Solon, Ohio
F	51	Steve Kuhn	6 ft 7 in (2.01 m)	200 lb (91 kg)	Sr	Lebanon, Pennsylvania
C	52	Mike Lang	6 ft 9 in (2.06 m)	240 lb (109 kg)	Fr	Lombard, Illinois
F	34	Donnie Mays	6 ft 5 in (1.96 m)	193 lb (88 kg)	Fr	Rubonia, Florida
G	20	Tracy Peal	6 ft 4 in (1.93 m)	177 lb (80 kg)	Fr	Glen Mills, Pennsylvania
G	33	Jim Solic	6 ft 4 in (1.93 m)	193 lb (88 kg)	So	State College, Pennsylvania
	55	George Strand	—	—	Jr	Philadelphia, Pennsylvania
G	21	Tom Wilkinson	6 ft 1 in (1.85 m)	165 lb (75 kg)	Sr	Lynbrook, New York
F	31	Scott Wolz	6 ft 7 in (2.01 m)	208 lb (94 kg)	So	Silver Spring, Maryland

Head coach

- Dick Harter

Assistant coach(es)

- Perry Clark

Legend

- (C) Team captain
- (S) Suspended
- (I) Ineligible
- (W) Walk-on
- Injured
- Current redshirt

== Schedule ==
Date time, TV	Rank^{#}	Opponent^{#}	Result	Record	Site city, state
December 2		Indiana (PA)	W 99–57	1–0	Rec Hall; University Park, Pennsylvania
December 3		at Maryland	L 55–56	1–1	Cole Field House; College Park, Maryland
December 5		Muhlenberg	W 85–41	2–1	Rec Hall; University Park, Pennsylvania
December 8		West Virginia	W 68–66 ^{OT}	3–1	Rec Hall; University Park, Pennsylvania
December 15		Syracuse	L 72–85	3–2	Rec Hall; University Park, Pennsylvania
December 19		Temple	L 48–74	3–3	Rec Hall; University Park, Pennsylvania
December 22		at Colgate	W 38–37	4–3	Cotterell Court; Hamilton, NY
December 26		vs. BYU	L 50–58	4–4	Memorial Coliseum; Portland, OR
December 28		vs. Idaho	L 46–50	4–5	Memorial Coliseum; Portland, OR
December 29		vs. Texas Tech	W 47–46	5–5	Memorial Coliseum; Portland, OR
January 3		Ursinus	W 87–55	6–5	Rec Hall; University Park, Pennsylvania
January 5		at Pittsburgh	L 50–54	6–6	Fitzgerald Field House; Pittsburgh, Pennsylvania
January 10		at St. Bonaventure	L 75–89	6–7	Reilly Center; St. Bonaventure, NY
January 12		Duquesne	W 62–52	7–7	Rec Hall; University Park, Pennsylvania
January 14		Delaware	W 85–53	8–7	Rec Hall; University Park, Pennsylvania
January 16		at West Virginia	W 75–71	9–7	WVU Coliseum; Morgantown, WV
January 19		Rutgers	W 75–66	10–7	Rec Hall; University Park, Pennsylvania
January 21		Johns Hopkins	W 64–38	11–7	Rec Hall; University Park, Pennsylvania
January 26		Fairleigh Dickinson	W 60–52	12–7	Rec Hall; University Park, Pennsylvania
January 28		Richmond	W 71–61	13–7	Rec Hall; University Park, Pennsylvania
January 31		at Duquesne	L 55–56	13–8	Mellon Arena; Pittsburgh, Pennsylvania
February 2		at Villanova	L 53–93	13–9	Villanova Field House; Villanova, Pennsylvania
February 4		at Vermont	W 53–40	14–9	Patrick Gym; Burlington, Vermont
February 9		at Navy	W 51–44	15–9	Halsey Field House; Annapolis, Maryland
February 13		Pittsburgh	W 66-53	16–9	Rec Hall; University Park, Pennsylvania
February 16		at George Washington	W 63-53	17–9	Charles E. Smith Center; Washington, DC
February 20		Massachusetts	W 50-36	18–9	Rec Hall; University Park, Pennsylvania
March 5		at Alabama; NIT First round	L 49-53	18–10	Birmingham–Jefferson Convention Complex; Birmingham, AL
*Non-conference game. ^{#}Rankings from AP Poll. (#) Tournament seedings in parentheses.
