= 1979–80 Nebraska Cornhuskers men's basketball team =

American college basketball season

1979–80 Nebraska Cornhuskers men's basketball

National Invitation Tournament, First Round
- Conference: Big Eight Conference
- Record: 18–13 (8–6 Big Eight)
- Head coach: Joe Cipriano (17th season)
- Home arena: Bob Devaney Sports Center

1979–80 Big Eight Conference men's basketball standings
	Conf.				Overall
Team	W		L	PCT	W		L	PCT
No. 16 Missouri	11	–	3	.786	25	–	6	.806
Kansas State †	8	–	6	.571	22	–	9	.710
Nebraska	8	–	6	.571	18	–	13	.581
Kansas	7	–	7	.500	15	–	14	.517
Colorado	7	–	7	.500	17	–	10	.630
Oklahoma	6	–	8	.429	15	–	12	.556
Iowa State	5	–	9	.357	11	–	16	.407
Oklahoma State	4	–	10	.286	10	–	17	.370
† 1980 Big Eight tournament winner Rankings from AP Poll

The 1979–80 Nebraska Cornhuskers men's basketball team represented the University of Nebraska–Lincoln during the 1979–80 NCAA Division I season. The Cornhuskers finished with record of 18–13, 8–6 in their conference. They were led by Joe Cipriano, in his final year as Nebraska head coach before his death.

== Schedule ==
Date time, TV	Rank^{#}	Opponent^{#}	Result	Record	Site city, state
November 30*		South Dakota State	W 100–83	1–0	Bob Devaney Sports Center; Lincoln, Nebraska
December 1*		Portland State	W 74–52	2–0	Bob Devaney Sports Center; Lincoln, Nebraska
December 3*		Eastern Washington	W 82–68	3–0	Bob Devaney Sports Center; Lincoln, Nebraska
December 8*		Creighton; Rivalry	W 64–55	4–0	Bob Devaney Sports Center; Lincoln, Nebraska
December 11*		at No. 9 Purdue	L 56–78	4–1	Mackey Arena; West Lafayette, Indiana
December 13*		Cal Bakersfield	W 94–80	5–1	Bob Devaney Sports Center; Lincoln, Nebraska
December 15*		at Minnesota	L 58–75	5–2	Williams Arena; Minneapolis, Minnesota
December 22*		UAB	W 92–84 ^{4OT}	6–2	Bob Devaney Sports Center; Lincoln, Nebraska
December 27*		vs. Wisconsin	W 83–82 ^{OT}	7–2	Neal S. Blaisdell Center; Honolulu, Hawaii
December 29*		vs. Hawaii	L 55–67	7–3	Neal S. Blaisdell Center; Honolulu, Hawaii
December 30*		vs. No. 12 Louisville	L 58–65	7–4	Neal S. Blaisdell Center; Honolulu, Hawaii
January 2*		at Idaho	L 55–64	7–5	Kibbie Dome; Moscow, Idaho
January 4*		Wisconsin-Oshkosh	W 96–72	8–5	Bob Devaney Sports Center; Lincoln, Nebraska
January 5*		Angelo State	W 83–70	9–5	Bob Devaney Sports Center; Lincoln, Nebraska
January 9		at Iowa State	W 58–50	10–5 (1–0)	Hilton Coliseum (6,827); Ames, Iowa
January 12		No. 13 Missouri	L 63–84	10–6 (1–1)	Bob Devaney Sports Center; Lincoln, Nebraska
January 16		Kansas	W 64–57	11–6 (2–1)	Bob Devaney Sports Center; Lincoln, Nebraska
January 19		at Colorado	W 53–44	12–6 (3–1)	CU Events/Conference Center; Boulder, Colorado
January 23		Oklahoma State	W 74–73 ^{OT}	13–6 (4–1)	Bob Devaney Sports Center; Lincoln, Nebraska
January 26		at Kansas State	L 64–66 ^{2OT}	13–7 (4–2)	Ahearn Field House; Manhattan, Kansas
January 30		Oklahoma	W 59–58	14–7 (5–2)	Bob Devaney Sports Center; Lincoln, Nebraska
February 2		at No. 14 Missouri	L 61–73	14–8 (5–3)	Hearnes Center; Columbia, Missouri
February 5		at Kansas	W 61–56	15–8 (6–3)	Allen Fieldhouse; Lawrence, Kansas
February 9		Iowa State	W 69–66	16–8 (7–3)	Bob Devaney Sports Center; Lincoln, Nebraska
February 13		at Oklahoma State	L 68–83	16–9 (7–4)	Gallagher Hall; Stillwater, Oklahoma
February 16		Colorado	L 55–56	16–10 (7–5)	Bob Devaney Sports Center; Lincoln, Nebraska
February 20		Kansas State	W 70–58	17–10 (8–5)	Bob Devaney Sports Center; Lincoln, Nebraska
February 23		at Oklahoma	L 60–78	17–11 (8–6)	Lloyd Noble Center; Norman, Oklahoma
Big 8 Tournament
February 26		Oklahoma	W 75–68	18–11 (8–6)	Bob Devaney Sports Center; Lincoln, Nebraska
February 29		vs. Kansas State	L 59–60	18–12 (8–6)	Kemper Arena; Kansas City, Missouri
NIT
March 6*		at Michigan	L 69–76	18–13 (8–6)	Crisler Arena; Ann Arbor, Michigan
*Non-conference game. ^{#}Rankings from AP Poll. (#) Tournament seedings in parentheses.
