= 1979–80 Kansas State Wildcats men's basketball team =

American college basketball season

1979–80 Kansas State Wildcats men's basketball

Big Eight tournament champions

NCAA tournament, Second Round
- Conference: Big Eight Conference
- Record: 22–9 (8–6 Big Eight)
- Head coach: Jack Hartman (10th season)
- Assistant coach: Lon Kruger (1st season)
- Home arena: Ahearn Field House

1979–80 Big Eight Conference men's basketball standings
	Conf.				Overall
Team	W		L	PCT	W		L	PCT
No. 16 Missouri	11	–	3	.786	25	–	6	.806
Kansas State †	8	–	6	.571	22	–	9	.710
Nebraska	8	–	6	.571	18	–	13	.581
Kansas	7	–	7	.500	15	–	14	.517
Colorado	7	–	7	.500	17	–	10	.630
Oklahoma	6	–	8	.429	15	–	12	.556
Iowa State	5	–	9	.357	11	–	16	.407
Oklahoma State	4	–	10	.286	10	–	17	.370
† 1980 Big Eight tournament winner Rankings from AP Poll

The 1979–80 Kansas State Wildcats men's basketball team represented Kansas State University as a member of the Big Eight Conference in the 1979–80 NCAA Division I men's basketball season. The team was led by head coach Jack Hartman and played their home games at Ahearn Field House in Manhattan, Kansas. The Wildcats, poised to win the conference regular season after winning 8 of 10 to begin Big Eight play, finished second in the conference regular season standings. K-State rebounded to win the Big Eight tournament and received an automatic bid to the NCAA tournament as No. 7 seed in the Midwest region. The Wildcats beat No. 10 seed Arkansas in the opening round, then fell to No. 2 seed and eventual National champion Louisville, 71–69 in overtime. Kansas State finished with a record of 22–9 (8–6 Big Eight).

== Roster ==
1979–80 Kansas State Wildcats men's basketball team
Players
Coaches

Pos.	#	Name	Height	Weight	Year	Hometown
G	10	Glenn Marshall	5 ft 11 in (1.8 m)	160 lb (73 kg)	Sr	St. Louis, Missouri
G	12	Tim Jankovich	6 ft 0 in (1.83 m)	165 lb (75 kg)	So	Manhattan, Kansas
G	20	Fred Barton	6 ft 2 in (1.88 m)	170 lb (77 kg)	Jr	Edwardsville, Illinois
G	25	Rolando Blackman	6 ft 6 in (1.98 m)	190 lb (86 kg)	Jr	Brooklyn, New York
G/F	32	Tyrone Adams	6 ft 6 in (1.98 m)	195 lb (88 kg)	Jr	Chicago, Illinois
G	35	Billy Lewis	6 ft 2 in (1.88 m)	190 lb (86 kg)	Fr	Mt. Healthy, Ohio
F	40	Manley Ray	6 ft 5 in (1.96 m)	225 lb (102 kg)	So	Portland, Oregon
F	45	Ed Nealy	6 ft 7 in (2.01 m)	238 lb (108 kg)	So	Bonner Springs, Kansas
F/C	52	Jari Willis	6 ft 7 in (2.01 m)	220 lb (100 kg)	Sr	Colorado Springs, Colorado
C	53	Greg Prudhoe	6 ft 11 in (2.11 m)	235 lb (107 kg)	So	East Peoria, Illinois

Head coach

- Jack Hartman

Assistant coach(es)

- Lon Kruger

Legend

- (C) Team captain
- (S) Suspended
- (I) Ineligible
- (W) Walk-on
- Injured
- Current redshirt

Roster

== Schedule and results ==
Date time, TV	Rank^{#}	Opponent^{#}	Result	Record	Site city, state
Regular Season
Dec 1, 1979*		Northern Iowa	W 84–38	1–0	Ahearn Field House; Manhattan, Kansas
Dec 3, 1979*		Portland State	W 72–57	2–0	Ahearn Field House; Manhattan, Kansas
Dec 5, 1979*		Oklahoma City	W 83–65	3–0	Ahearn Field House; Manhattan, Kansas
Dec 8, 1979*		Wisconsin–Parkside	W 90–77	4–0	Ahearn Field House; Manhattan, Kansas
Dec 10, 1979*		South Dakota	W 91–59	5–0	Ahearn Field House; Manhattan, Kansas
Dec 12, 1979*		Arizona State	W 63–50	6–0	Ahearn Field House; Manhattan, Kansas
Dec 15, 1979*		at Southern Illinois	W 75–69	7–0	SIU Arena; Carbondale, Illinois
Dec 17, 1979*		at Cal State Bakersfield	W 106–53	8–0	Ahearn Field House; Manhattan, Kansas
Dec 22, 1979*		at Minnesota	L 61–78	8–1	Williams Arena; Minneapolis, Minnesota
Dec 30, 1979*		at No. 19 Arkansas	W 66–57	9–1	Barnhill Arena; Fayetteville, Arkansas
Jan 2, 1980*		Long Beach State	W 90–67	10–1	Ahearn Field House; Manhattan, Kansas
Jan 5, 1980*		at No. 15 Louisville	L 73–85	10–2	Freedom Hall; Louisville, Kentucky
Jan 9, 1980		at Oklahoma State	W 60–59	11–2 (1–0)	Gallagher-Iba Arena; Stillwater, Oklahoma
Jan 12, 1980		Oklahoma	L 62–72	11–3 (1–1)	Ahearn Field House; Manhattan, Kansas
Jan 16, 1980		at Colorado	W 71–65	12–3 (2–1)	Coors Events Center; Boulder, Colorado
Jan 19, 1980		at Kansas	W 61–52	13–3 (3–1)	Allen Fieldhouse; Lawrence, Kansas
Jan 23, 1980		Iowa State	W 73–63	14–3 (4–1)	Ahearn Field House; Manhattan, Kansas
Jan 26, 1980		Nebraska	W 66–64	15–3 (5–1)	Ahearn Field House; Manhattan, Kansas
Jan 30, 1980	No. 20	at No. 14 Missouri	W 66–64	16–3 (6–1)	Hearnes Center; Columbia, Missouri
Feb 2, 1980	No. 20	at Oklahoma	L 55–56	16–4 (6–2)	Lloyd Noble Center; Norman, Oklahoma
Feb 6, 1980		Colorado	W 62–61	17–4 (7–2)	Ahearn Field House; Manhattan, Kansas
Feb 9, 1980		Oklahoma State	W 82–72	18–4 (8–2)	Ahearn Field House; Manhattan, Kansas
Feb 13, 1980		at Iowa State	L 58–66	18–5 (8–3)	Hilton Coliseum; Ames, Iowa
Feb 16, 1980		Kansas	L 46–48	18–6 (8–4)	Ahearn Field House; Manhattan, Kansas
Feb 20, 1980		at Nebraska	L 58–70	18–7 (8–5)	Bob Devaney Sports Center; Lincoln, Nebraska
Feb 23, 1980		No. 13 Missouri	L 65–67	18–8 (8–6)	Ahearn Field House; Manhattan, Kansas
Big Eight Tournament
Feb 26, 1980*		vs. Iowa State; Quarterfinals	W 101–87	19–8	Kemper Arena; Kansas City, Missouri
Feb 27, 1980*		vs. Nebraska; Semifinals	W 60–59	20–8	Kemper Arena; Kansas City, Missouri
Feb 28, 1980*		vs. Kansas; Championship game	W 79–58	21–8	Kemper Arena; Kansas City, Missouri
NCAA Tournament
Mar 6, 1980*	(7 MW)	vs. (10 MW) Arkansas; First round	W 71–53	22–8	Bob Devaney Sports Center; Lincoln, Nebraska
Mar 8, 1980*	(7 MW)	vs. (2 MW) No. 2 Louisville; Second round	L 69–71 ^{OT}	22–9	Bob Devaney Sports Center; Lincoln, Nebraska
*Non-conference game. ^{#}Rankings from AP Poll. (#) Tournament seedings in parentheses. MW=Midwest.

== Awards and honors ==
- Rolando Blackman – Big Eight Player of the Year
