= 1980 Metro Conference men's basketball tournament =

- Classification: Division I
- Season: 1979–80
- Teams: 7
- Site: Freedom Hall; Louisville, KY
- Champions: Louisville (2nd title)
- Winning coach: Denny Crum (2nd title)
- MVP: Darrell Griffith (Louisville)
- Television: Tanner Sports Network (finals)

1979–80 Metro Conference men's basketball standings
	Conf.				Overall
Team	W		L	PCT	W		L	PCT
No. 2 Louisville †	12	–	0	1.000	33	–	3	.917
Virginia Tech	8	–	4	.667	21	–	8	.724
Florida State	7	–	5	.583	22	–	9	.710
Memphis State	5	–	7	.417	13	–	14	.481
Saint Louis	4	–	8	.333	12	–	15	.444
Cincinnati	3	–	9	.250	13	–	15	.464
Tulane	3	–	9	.250	10	–	17	.370
† 1980 Metro Conference tournament winner Rankings from AP Poll

The 1980 Metro Conference men's basketball tournament was held February 28–March 2 at Freedom Hall in Louisville, Kentucky.

Top-seeded Louisville defeated Florida State in the championship game, 81–72, to win their second Metro men's basketball tournament.

The Cardinals, in turn, received an automatic bid to the 1980 NCAA Tournament, which they would go on to win. Fellow Metro Conference members Florida State and Virginia Tech also qualified for the NCAA field.

== Format ==
All seven of the conference's members participated in the tournament field. They were seeded based on regular season conference records, with the top team earning a bye into the semifinal round. The other six teams entered into the preliminary first round.

== Bracket ==
First round Thursday, February 28
5	Saint Louis	60
4	Memphis State	62
3	Florida State	85
6	Tulane	73
7	Cincinnati	65
2	Virginia Tech	51

Semifinals; Saturday, March 1
1	Louisville	84
Memphis State	65
3	Florida State	79
7	Cincinnati	69

Championship; Sunday, March 2
1	Louisville	81
3	Florida State	72
