= 1980 ECAC Metro men's basketball tournament =

- Classification: Division I
- Season: 1979–80
- Teams: 8
- Finals site: Nassau Coliseum; Uniondale, New York
- Champions: Iona (2nd title)
- Winning coach: Jim Valvano (2nd title)
- MVP: Jeff Ruland (Iona)
- ECAC Metro men's basketball tournaments

1979–80 ECAC Metro men's basketball standings
	Conf.				Overall
Team	W		L	PCT	W		L	PCT
No. 19 Iona		–		–	28	–	4	.875
Saint Peter's		–		–	22	–	9	.710
Long Island		–		–	14	–	12	.538
Wagner		–		–	14	–	13	.519
Siena		–		–	14	–	14	.500
Fairleigh Dickinson		–		–	13	–	14	.481
St. Francis (NY)		–		–	11	–	15	.423
Fairfield		–		–	11	–	16	.407
Fordham		–		–	11	–	17	.393
Army		–		–	9	–	17	.346
Manhattan		–		–	4	–	22	.154
† 1980 ECAC Metro tournament winner Rankings from AP poll *Iona vacated NCAA Tournament games due to NCAA sanctions. Disputed record (29–5)

The 1980 ECAC Metro men's basketball tournament was held February 28 – March 1. The quarterfinal and championship rounds were played at St. Johns in Jamaica Queens, not the Coliseum. Nassau Coliseum in Uniondale, New York.

Jim Valvano’s Iona Gaels defeated Saint Peter's in the championship game, 64–46, to win their second ECAC Metro men's basketball tournament in as many years. The Gaels earned a bid to the 1980 NCAA Tournament as No. 6 seed in the East region and advanced to the round of 32.

== Bracket ==
Quarterfinals; February 28
Iona	69
Fairleigh Dickinson	53
Siena	80
Long Island University	78
Fordham	73
Wagner	67
Saint Peter's	54
Fairfield	42

Semifinals; February 29
Iona	76
Siena	70
Fordham	47
Saint Peter's	65

Championship; March 1
Iona	64
Saint Peter's	46

Notes

Conference did not play a formal schedule
