= 1979–80 Missouri Tigers men's basketball team =

American college basketball season

1979–80 Missouri Tigers men's basketball

Big Eight regular season champions

NCAA Tournament, Regional semifinals, L 68–83 vs. LSU
- Conference: Big Eight Conference

Ranking
- Coaches: No. 14
- AP: No. 16
- Record: 25–6 (11–3 Big 8)
- Head coach: Norm Stewart (13th season)
- Assistant coach: Gary Garner (3rd season)
- Captain: Larry Drew
- Home arena: Hearnes Center

1979–80 Big Eight Conference men's basketball standings
	Conf.				Overall
Team	W		L	PCT	W		L	PCT
No. 16 Missouri	11	–	3	.786	25	–	6	.806
Kansas State †	8	–	6	.571	22	–	9	.710
Nebraska	8	–	6	.571	18	–	13	.581
Kansas	7	–	7	.500	15	–	14	.517
Colorado	7	–	7	.500	17	–	10	.630
Oklahoma	6	–	8	.429	15	–	12	.556
Iowa State	5	–	9	.357	11	–	16	.407
Oklahoma State	4	–	10	.286	10	–	17	.370
† 1980 Big Eight tournament winner Rankings from AP Poll

The 1979–80 Missouri Tigers men's basketball team represented the University of Missouri during the 1979–80 NCAA men's basketball season. Led by legendary coach Norm Stewart, the Tigers won the Big 8 regular season title by three games, but were upset in the semifinal round of the Big 8 Tournament. Missouri reached the Sweet Sixteen of the NCAA Tournament before being eliminated by Louisiana State to finish with a 25–6 record (11–3 Big 8).

== Roster ==
- Curtis Berry, Jr.
- Al Hightower Sr.
- Tom Dore Sr.
- Mike Foster Jr.
- Mark Dressler, Sr.
- Larry Drew, Sr.
- Ricky Frazier, Fr.
- Steve Stipanovich, Fr.
- Jon Sundvold, Fr.
- Head coach: Norm Stewart

== Schedule and results ==
Date time, TV	Rank^{#}	Opponent^{#}	Result	Record	Site city, state
Regular Season
Nov 30, 1979*		Texas State	W 86–70	1–0	Hearnes Center; Columbia, Missouri
Dec 1, 1979*		South Dakota State	W 80–60	2–0	Hearnes Center; Columbia, Missouri
Dec 4, 1979*		at Illinois; Show-Me Classic	W 67–66 ^{OT}	3–0	Assembly Hall (14,004); Champaign, Illinois
Dec 7, 1979*		George Washington	W 89–73	4–0	Hearnes Center; Columbia, Missouri
Dec 8, 1979*		Arkansas State; Show-Me Classic	W 86–67	5–0	Hearnes Center; Columbia, Missouri
Dec 10, 1979*; ESPN		Southern California	W 78–75	6–0	Hearnes Center; Columbia, Missouri
Dec 12, 1979*	No. 19	at Butler	W 64–60	7–0	Hinkle Fieldhouse; Indianapolis, Indiana
Dec 15, 1979*	No. 19	Northern Arizona	W 112–64	8–0	Hearnes Center; Columbia, Missouri
Dec 17, 1979*	No. 19	Oral Roberts	W 84–73	9–0	Hearnes Center; Columbia, Missouri
Dec 21, 1979*	No. 16	at Saint Louis	W 77–75	10–0	St. Louis Arena; St. Louis, Missouri
Jan 2, 1980*; ESPN	No. 12	No. 3 DePaul	L 79–92	10–1	Alumni Hall; Chicago, Illinois
Jan 5, 1980*	No. 12	Lamar	W 71–60	11–1	Hearnes Center; Columbia, Missouri
Jan 9, 1980	No. 13	at Kansas; Border War	L 66–69	11–2 (0–1)	Allen Fieldhouse; Lawrence, Kansas
Jan 12, 1980	No. 13	at Nebraska	W 84–63	12–2 (1–1)	Bob Devaney Sports Center; Lincoln, Nebraska
Jan 16, 1980	No. 15	Iowa State	W 85–70	13–2 (2–1)	Hearnes Center; Columbia, Missouri
Jan 19, 1980	No. 15	at Oklahoma State	W 69–64	14–2 (3–1)	Gallagher Hall; Stillwater, Oklahoma
Jan 23, 1980	No. 10	Colorado	W 78–45	15–2 (4–1)	Hearnes Center; Columbia, Missouri
Jan 26, 1980	No. 10	at Oklahoma	L 73–78	15–3 (4–2)	Lloyd Noble Center; Norman, Oklahoma
January 30, 1980	No. 14	No. 20 Kansas State	L 64–66	15–4 (4–3)	Hearnes Center; Columbia, Missouri
Feb 2, 1980	No. 14	Nebraska	W 73–60	16–4 (5–3)	Hearnes Center; Columbia, Missouri
Feb 6, 1980	No. 15	at Iowa State	W 84–70	17–4 (6–3)	Hilton Coliseum; Ames, Iowa
Feb 9, 1980	No. 15	Kansas; Border War	W 88–65	18–4 (7–3)	Hearnes Center; Columbia, Missouri
Feb 13, 1980	No. 14	at Colorado	W 83–68	19–4 (8–3)	Conference Center; Boulder, Colorado
Feb 16, 1980	No. 14	Oklahoma State	W 93–81	20–4 (9–3)	Hearnes Center; Columbia, Missouri
Feb 20, 1980	No. 13	Oklahoma	W 81–69	21–4 (10–3)	Hearnes Center; Columbia, Missouri
Feb 23, 1980	No. 13	at Kansas State	W 67–65	22–4 (11–3)	Ahearn Field House; Manhattan, Kansas
Big 12 Tournament
Feb 26, 1980*	No. 11	vs. Oklahoma State; Quarterfinals	W 82–69	23–4	Kemper Arena; Kansas City, Missouri
Feb 27, 1980*	No. 11	vs. Kansas; Semifinals	L 71–80	23–5	Kemper Arena; Kansas City, Missouri
NCAA Tournament
Mar 6, 1980*	(5) No. 16	vs. (12) San Jose State; First Round	W 61–51	24–5	Bob Devaney Sports Center; Lincoln, Nebraska
Mar 8, 1980*	(5) No. 16	vs. (4) No. 9 Notre Dame; Second Round	W 87–84 ^{OT}	25–5	Bob Devaney Sports Center; Lincoln, Nebraska
Mar 14, 1980*	(5) No. 16	vs. (1) No. 3 Louisiana State	L 63–68	25–6	The Summit; Houston, Texas
*Non-conference game. ^{#}Rankings from AP Poll. (#) Tournament seedings in parentheses.

== Awards ==
All Big Eight: Curtis Berry, Larry Drew
