= 1979–80 Florida State Seminoles men's basketball team =

American college basketball season

1979–80 Florida State Seminoles men's basketball

NCAA tournament
- Conference: Metro Conference (1975–1995)
- Record: 22–9 (7–5 Metro)
- Head coach: Joe Williams (2nd season)
- Home arena: Tully Gymnasium

1979–80 Metro Conference men's basketball standings
	Conf.				Overall
Team	W		L	PCT	W		L	PCT
No. 2 Louisville †	12	–	0	1.000	33	–	3	.917
Virginia Tech	8	–	4	.667	21	–	8	.724
Florida State	7	–	5	.583	22	–	9	.710
Memphis State	5	–	7	.417	13	–	14	.481
Saint Louis	4	–	8	.333	12	–	15	.444
Cincinnati	3	–	9	.250	13	–	15	.464
Tulane	3	–	9	.250	10	–	17	.370
† 1980 Metro Conference tournament winner Rankings from AP Poll

The 1979–80 Florida State Seminoles men's basketball team represented the Florida State University during the 1979–80 NCAA men's basketball season.

== Roster ==
1979–80 Florida State Seminoles men's basketball team
Players
Coaches

Pos.	#	Name	Height	Weight	Year	Hometown
F		Greg Collinsworth	6 ft 5 in (1.96 m)	195 lb (88 kg)	So	Titusville, Florida
G		Mickey Dillard	6 ft 3 in (1.91 m)	170 lb (77 kg)	Jr	Dania, Florida
G		Tony Jackson	6 ft 0 in (1.83 m)	165 lb (75 kg)	Sr	Lexington, Kentucky

Head coach

- Joe Williams

Assistant coach(es)

Legend

- (C) Team captain
- (S) Suspended
- (I) Ineligible
- (W) Walk-on
- Injured
- Current redshirt

== Schedule ==
Date time, TV	Rank^{#}	Opponent^{#}	Result	Record	Site city, state
November 30*		Florida A&M	W 101–63	1–0	Tully Gymnasium; Tallahassee, Florida
December 2*		Jacksonville	L 76–77	1–1	Tully Gymnasium; Tallahassee, Florida
December 6*		at South Florida	W 80–71	2–1	Bayfront Center; Tampa, Florida
December 8*		Florida	W 87–70	3–1	Tully Gymnasium; Tallahassee, Florida
December 20*		Minnesota	W 112–91	4–1	Tully Gymnasium; Tallahassee, Florida
December 29*		at Western Kentucky	W 67–65	5–1	E.A. Diddle Arena
December 31		vs. Tulane	W 108–97	6–1 (1–0)	Miami, Florida
January 4		at St. Louis	W 75–73	7–1 (2–0)	Kiel Auditorium; St. Louis, Missouri
January 7*		South Florida	W 84–69	8–1 (2–0)	Tully Gymnasium; Tallahassee, Florida
January 10		at Memphis	W 74–69	9–1 (3–0)	Mid-South Coliseum
January 12		at Tulane	L 79–80	9–2 (3–1)	Avron B. Fogelman Arena
January 14*		South Carolina Aiken	W 82–69	10–2 (3–1)	Tully Gymnasium; Tallahassee, Florida
January 19*		at Marquette	L 64–74	10–3 (3–1)	MECCA Arena; Milwaukee, WI
January 21		Virginia Tech	L 77–79	10–4 (3–2)	Tully Gymnasium; Tallahassee, Florida
January 27		at Louisville	L 73–79	10–5 (3–3)	Freedom Hall; Louisville, Kentucky
February 2		at Cincinnati	W 54–52	11–5 (4–3)	Riverfront Coliseum; Cincinnati, Ohio
February 4*		Auburn	W 73–69	12–5 (4–3)	Tully Gymnasium; Tallahassee, Florida
February 7		Memphis State	W 55–54	13–5 (5–3)	Tully Gymnasium; Tallahassee, Florida
February 9		Cincinnati	W 77–74	14–5 (6–3)	Tully Gymnasium; Tallahassee, Florida
February 11*		at Florida Southern	W 85–78	15–5 (6–3)	
February 14		St. Louis	W 71–69	16–5 (7–3)	Tully Gymnasium; Tallahassee, Florida
February 16*		at Jacksonville	W 64–55	17–5 (7–3)	Jacksonville, Florida
February 18*		Cleveland State	W 88–83	18–5 (7–3)	Tully Gymnasium; Tallahassee, Florida
February 20*		UAB	W 89–87	19–5 (7–3)	Tully Gymnasium; Tallahassee, Florida
February 22		at Virginia Tech	L 76–78	19–6 (7–4)	Cassell Coliseum
February 24		Louisville	L 75–83	19–7 (7–5)	Tully Gymnasium; Tallahassee, Florida
Metro tournament
February 28		at Tulane	W 85–73	20–7 (7–5)	Freedom Hall; Louisville, Kentucky
March 1		vs. Cincinnati	W 79–69	21–7 (7–5)	Freedom Hall; Louisville, Kentucky
March 2		at Louisville	L 72–81	21–8 (7–5)	Freedom Hall; Louisville, Kentucky
NCAA Tournament
March 7*		vs. Toledo	W 94–91	22–8 (7–5)	E. A. Diddle Arena
March 9*		vs. No. 4 Kentucky	L 78–97	22–9 (7–5)	E. A. Diddle Arena
*Non-conference game. ^{#}Rankings from AP Poll. (#) Tournament seedings in parentheses.
