= 1979–80 Virginia Tech Hokies men's basketball team =

American college basketball season

1979–80 Virginia Tech Hokies men's basketball

NCAA tournament, Second round
- Conference: Metro Conference (1975–1995)
- Record: 21–8 (8–4 Metro)
- Head coach: Charles Moir (4th season)
- Home arena: Cassell Coliseum

1979–80 Metro Conference men's basketball standings
	Conf.				Overall
Team	W		L	PCT	W		L	PCT
No. 2 Louisville †	12	–	0	1.000	33	–	3	.917
Virginia Tech	8	–	4	.667	21	–	8	.724
Florida State	7	–	5	.583	22	–	9	.710
Memphis State	5	–	7	.417	13	–	14	.481
Saint Louis	4	–	8	.333	12	–	15	.444
Cincinnati	3	–	9	.250	13	–	15	.464
Tulane	3	–	9	.250	10	–	17	.370
† 1980 Metro Conference tournament winner Rankings from AP Poll

The 1979–80 Virginia Tech Hokies men's basketball team represented Virginia Polytechnic Institute and State University from Blacksburg, Virginia as members of the Metro Conference during the 1979–80 season. The Hokies were led by head coach Charles Moir and played their home games at Cassell Coliseum in Blacksburg, Virginia. After finishing second in the Metro regular season standings, Virginia Tech lost in the quarterfinal round of the conference tournament but did secure a bid to the NCAA tournament. As No. 7 seed in the Mideast region, the team beat No. 10 seed Western Kentucky in the opening round before losing to Indiana.

== Roster ==
1979–80 Virginia Tech Hokies men's basketball team
Players
Coaches

Pos.	#	Name	Height	Weight	Year	Hometown
F	44	David Bennett	6 ft 6 in (1.98 m)	205 lb (93 kg)	Jr	Bloomfield Hills, Michigan
F	32	Gordy Bryan	6 ft 8 in (2.03 m)	215 lb (98 kg)	So	Philadelphia, Pennsylvania
F	25	Michael Cooke	6 ft 5 in (1.96 m)	190 lb (86 kg)	Fr	Richmond, Virginia
F	21	Les Henson	6 ft 6 in (1.98 m)	190 lb (86 kg)	Sr	Richmond, Virginia
F	12	Linwood Henson	6 ft 4 in (1.93 m)	168 lb (76 kg)	So	Richmond, Virginia
C	50	John Hillenbrand	6 ft 9 in (2.06 m)	230 lb (104 kg)	Sr	Bemus Point, New York
G	10	Page Moir	5 ft 11 in (1.8 m)	165 lb (75 kg)	Fr	Blacksburg, Virginia
G	11	Dexter Reid	6 ft 1 in (1.85 m)	165 lb (75 kg)	Jr	Norfolk, Virginia
F	40	Wayne Robinson	6 ft 8 in (2.03 m)	225 lb (102 kg)	Sr	Greensboro, North Carolina
G	24	Jeff Schneider	6 ft 4 in (1.93 m)	170 lb (77 kg)	So	Clarksburg, West Virginia
G	15	Chris Scott	6 ft 3 in (1.91 m)	163 lb (74 kg)	Sr	Fairfax, Virginia
G	14	Mark Shrader	5 ft 11 in (1.8 m)	155 lb (70 kg)	Jr	Malvern, Pennsylvania
C	35	Dale Solomon	6 ft 8 in (2.03 m)	225 lb (102 kg)	So	Annapolis, Maryland
G	23	Reggie Steppe	6 ft 0 in (1.83 m)	170 lb (77 kg)	Fr	Charlottesville, Virginia

Head coach

- Charles Moir (Appalachian State)

Assistant coach(es)

Legend

- (C) Team captain
- (S) Suspended
- (I) Ineligible
- (W) Walk-on
- Injured
- Current redshirt

Roster

== Schedule and results ==
Date time, TV	Rank^{#}	Opponent^{#}	Result	Record	Site city, state
Regular Season
Feb 11, 1980		No. 3 Louisville	L 54–56	17–4	Cassell Coliseum; Blacksburg, Virginia
Metro Tournament
Feb 28, 1980*		vs. Cincinnati; Quarterfinals	L 51–65	20–7	Freedom Hall; Louisville, Kentucky
NCAA Tournament
Mar 7, 1980*	(7 ME)	at (10 ME) Western Kentucky; First round	W 89–85 ^{OT}	21–7	E. A. Diddle Arena; Bowling Green, Kentucky
Mar 9, 1980*	(7 ME)	vs. (2 ME) No. 7 Indiana; Second round	L 59–68	21–8	E. A. Diddle Arena; Bowling Green, Kentucky
*Non-conference game. ^{#}Rankings from AP Poll. (#) Tournament seedings in parentheses. ME=Mideast.
