= 1980 ECAC South men's basketball tournament =

- Classification: Division I
- Season: 1979–80
- Teams: 8
- Site: Hampton Coliseum; Hampton, VA
- Champions: Old Dominion (1st title)
- Winning coach: Paul Webb (1st title)
- MVP: Mark West (Old Dominion)
- ECAC South men's basketball tournaments

1979–80 ECAC South men's basketball standings
	Conf.				Overall
Team	W		L	PCT	W		L	PCT
Old Dominion †	-	–	-	–	25	–	5	.833
James Madison	-	–	-	–	18	–	8	.692
Navy	-	–	-	–	14	–	13	.519
Richmond	4	–	3	.571	13	–	14	.481
Baltimore	-	–	-	–	12	–	15	.444
William & Mary	-	–	-	–	12	–	15	.444
St. Francis (PA)	-	–	-	–	12	–	16	.429
Towson State	-	–	-	–	9	–	17	.346
Catholic	-	–	-	–	8	–	19	.296
Robert Morris	-	–	-	–	7	–	19	.269
George Mason	-	–	-	–	5	–	21	.192
† 1980 ECAC South tournament winner Rankings from AP Poll

The 1980 ECAC South men's basketball tournament (now known as the Coastal Athletic Association men's basketball tournament) was held February 28– March 1, 1980, at the Hampton Coliseum in Hampton, Virginia. It was the first edition of the tournament.

Old Dominion defeated Navy in the championship game, 62–51, to win their first ECAC South men's basketball tournament. The Monarchs, therefore, earned an automatic bid to the 1980 NCAA tournament; this was ODU's first-ever bid to the Division I NCAA tournament.

== Bracket ==
Quarterfinals; Thursday, February 28
1	Old Dominion	112
8	Catholic	59
5	William & Mary	78
4	Richmond	77
3	Navy	51
6	Baltimore	50
7	St. Francis (PA)	58
2	James Madison	54

Semifinals; Friday, February 29
1	Old Dominion	75
5	William & Mary	59
3	Navy	75
7	St. Francis (PA)	62

Championship; Saturday, March 1
1	Old Dominion	62
3	Navy	51
