= 1980 Big Eight Conference men's basketball tournament =

- Classification: Division I
- Season: 1979–80
- Teams: 8
- First round site: Campus Sites; Campus Arenas
- Finals site: Kemper Arena; Kansas City, MO
- Champions: Kansas State (2nd title)
- Winning coach: Jack Hartman (2nd title)
- MVP: Rolando Blackman (Kansas State)

1979–80 Big Eight Conference men's basketball standings
	Conf.				Overall
Team	W		L	PCT	W		L	PCT
No. 16 Missouri	11	–	3	.786	25	–	6	.806
Kansas State †	8	–	6	.571	22	–	9	.710
Nebraska	8	–	6	.571	18	–	13	.581
Kansas	7	–	7	.500	15	–	14	.517
Colorado	7	–	7	.500	17	–	10	.630
Oklahoma	6	–	8	.429	15	–	12	.556
Iowa State	5	–	9	.357	11	–	16	.407
Oklahoma State	4	–	10	.286	10	–	17	.370
† 1980 Big Eight tournament winner Rankings from AP Poll

The 1980 Big Eight Conference men's basketball tournament was held February 26–28 at a combination of on-campus gymnasiums and Kemper Arena in Kansas City, Missouri.

Kansas State defeated rivals Kansas in the championship game, 79–58, to win their second Big Eight men's basketball tournament.

The Wildcats, in turn, received a bid to the 1980 NCAA tournament. Missouri was the only other Big Eight team to receive an invite to this year's tournament.

== Format ==
All eight of the conference's members participated in the tournament field. They were seeded based on regular season conference records, with all teams placed and paired in the initial quarterfinal round.

All first round games were played on the home court of the higher-seeded team. The semifinals and championship game, in turn, were played at a neutral site at Kemper Arena in Kansas City, Missouri.

== Bracket ==
Quarterfinals; Tuesday, February 26
1	#11 Missouri	82
8	Oklahoma State	69
5	Colorado	65
4	Kansas	75
3	Nebraska	75
6	Oklahoma	68
7	Iowa State	87
2	Kansas State	101

Semifinals; Wednesday, February 27
1	#11 Missouri	71
4	Kansas	80
3	Nebraska	59
2	Kansas State	60

Championship; Thursday, February 28
4	Kansas	58
2	Kansas State	79
