= 1979–80 Iowa State Cyclones men's basketball team =

American college basketball season

1979–80 Iowa State Cyclones men's basketball
- Conference: Big Eight Conference
- Record: 11–16 (5–9 Big Eight)
- Head coach: Lynn Nance (4th season)
- Assistant coaches: Rick Samuels; Reggie Warford
- Home arena: Hilton Coliseum

1979–80 Big Eight Conference men's basketball standings
	Conf.				Overall
Team	W		L	PCT	W		L	PCT
No. 16 Missouri	11	–	3	.786	25	–	6	.806
Kansas State †	8	–	6	.571	22	–	9	.710
Nebraska	8	–	6	.571	18	–	13	.581
Kansas	7	–	7	.500	15	–	14	.517
Colorado	7	–	7	.500	17	–	10	.630
Oklahoma	6	–	8	.429	15	–	12	.556
Iowa State	5	–	9	.357	11	–	16	.407
Oklahoma State	4	–	10	.286	10	–	17	.370
† 1980 Big Eight tournament winner Rankings from AP Poll

The 1979–80 Iowa State Cyclones men's basketball team represented Iowa State University during the 1979–80 NCAA Division I men's basketball season. The Cyclones were coached by Lynn Nance, who was in his fourth and final season with the Cyclones. They played their home games at Hilton Coliseum in Ames, Iowa. Nance resigned on January 29, 1980. Assistants Rick Samuels and Reggie Warford took over for the remainder of the season.

They finished the season 11–16, 5–9 in Big Eight play to finish in seventh place. The Cyclones lost in the first round of the Big Eight tournament to Kansas State, falling 101–87.

== Roster ==
1979–80 Iowa State Cyclones men's basketball team
Players
Coaches

Pos.	#	Name	Height	Weight	Year	Hometown
C		Joe Ashley	6 ft 11 in (2.11 m)	240 lb (109 kg)	Fr	Pierre, South Dakota
F		Bill Buchanan	6 ft 6 in (1.98 m)	210 lb (95 kg)	Jr	Campbellsville, Kentucky
F		Flemming Danielsen	6 ft 7 in (2.01 m)	180 lb (82 kg)	Fr	Copenhagen, Denmark
F		Robert Estes	6 ft 6 in (1.98 m)	190 lb (86 kg)	So	Liberty, Missouri
C		Ron Falenschek	6 ft 10 in (2.08 m)	235 lb (107 kg)	Fr	Brainerd, Minnesota
F		Bob Fowler	6 ft 5 in (1.96 m)	200 lb (91 kg)	Sr	Westland, Michigan
C		Chuck Harmison	6 ft 9 in (2.06 m)	220 lb (100 kg)	Sr	Ames, Iowa
G		Charles Harris	6 ft 2 in (1.88 m)	175 lb (79 kg)	Jr	Macon, GA
		Scott Howard	—	—
G		Doug Jones	6 ft 9 in (2.06 m)	215 lb (98 kg)	Fr	Prior Lake, Minnesota
		John Kunnert	6 ft 6 in (1.98 m)	—
G		Guy Minnifield	6 ft 3 in (1.91 m)	170 lb (77 kg)	Fr	Lexington, Kentucky
G		Lefty Moore	5 ft 10 in (1.78 m)	175 lb (79 kg)	Jr	Detroit, Michigan
G		Jon Ness	6 ft 2 in (1.88 m)	180 lb (82 kg)	Jr	Story City, Iowa
G		John Tillo	6 ft 4 in (1.93 m)	195 lb (88 kg)	Sr	Sioux City, Iowa
C		Dean Uthoff	6 ft 11 in (2.11 m)	250 lb (113 kg)	Sr	Cedar Rapids, Iowa

Head coach

- Lynn Nance

Assistant coach(es)

- Rick Samuels
- Reggie Warford

Legend

- (C) Team captain
- (S) Suspended
- (I) Ineligible
- (W) Walk-on
- Injured
- Current redshirt

== Schedule and results ==
Date time, TV	Rank^{#}	Opponent^{#}	Result	Record	Site city, state
Regular season
November 30, 1979*; 7:35 pm		St. Cloud State	W 93–71	1–0	Hilton Coliseum (6,800); Ames, Iowa
December 3, 1979*; 7:00 pm		at No. 5 Notre Dame	L 77–87	1–1	Athletic & Convocation Center (11,345); Notre Dame, Indiana
December 5, 1979*; 7:35 pm		Missouri-Kansas City	W 121–82	2–1	Hilton Coliseum (6,500); Ames, Iowa
December 8, 1979*; 7:35 pm		at Drake; Iowa Big Four	L 66–87	2–2	Veterans Memorial Auditorium (12,100); Des Moines, Iowa
December 10, 1979*; 7:35 pm		Roosevelt	W 125–60	3–2	Hilton Coliseum (5,000); Ames, Iowa
December 15, 1979*; 7:35 pm, WOI/KWWL		No. 17 Iowa; CyHawk Rivalry	L 64–67	3–3	Hilton Coliseum (14,000); Ames, Iowa
December 18, 1979*; 7:35 pm		Mississippi State	L 63–84	3–4	Hilton Coliseum (6,000); Ames, Iowa
December 20, 1979*; 7:35 pm		Eastern Montana (MSU-Billings)	W 76–73	4–4	Hilton Coliseum (3,500); Ames, Iowa
December 22, 1979*; 7:35 pm		Nebraska-Omaha	L 68–69 ^{OT}	4–5	Hilton Coliseum (3,500); Ames, Iowa
December 26, 1979*; 8:00 pm		vs. Florida; Gator Bowl Classic Semifinals	L 59–63	4–6	Jacksonville Memorial Coliseum (8,635); Jacksonville, Florida
December 27, 1979*; 6:15 pm		vs. William & Mary; Gator Bowl Classic Consolation	W 56–55	5–6	Jacksonville Memorial Coliseum (9,481); Jacksonville, Florida
January 3, 1980*; 7:30 pm		MacMurray	W 88–58	6–6	Hilton Coliseum (3,100); Ames, Iowa
January 9, 1980; 7:35 pm		Nebraska	L 50–58	6–7 (0–1)	Hilton Coliseum (6,827); Ames, Iowa
January 12, 1980; 7:35 pm		Kansas	W 67–66	7–7 (1–1)	Hilton Coliseum (9,535); Ames, Iowa
January 16, 1980; 8:05 pm		at No. 15 Missouri	L 70–85	7–8 (1–2)	Hearnes Center; Columbia, Missouri
January 19, 1980; 12:40 pm, Big Eight		Oklahoma	L 78–93	7–9 (1–3)	Hilton Coliseum; Ames, Iowa
January 23, 1980; 7:35 pm		at Kansas State	L 63–73	7–10 (1–4)	Ahearn Fieldhouse; Manhattan, Kansas
January 26, 1980; 2:38 pm, Big Eight		Oklahoma State	W 69–60	8–10 (2–4)	Hilton Coliseum; Ames, Iowa
January 30, 1980; 8:35 pm		at Colorado	L 68–78	8–11 (2–5)	Coors Events Center; Boulder, Colorado
February 2, 1980; 7:35 pm		at Kansas	L 61–72	8–12 (2–6)	Allen Fieldhouse; Lawrence, Kansas
February 6, 1980; 7:35 pm		No. 15 Missouri	L 70–84	8–13 (2–7)	Hilton Coliseum; Ames, Iowa
February 9, 1980; 7:35 pm		at Nebraska	L 66–69	8–14 (2–8)	Devaney Sports Center; Lincoln, Nebraska
February 13, 1980; 7:35 pm		No. 19 Kansas State	W 66–58	9–14 (3–8)	Hilton Coliseum; Ames, Iowa
February 16, 1980; 4:05 pm		at Oklahoma	W 66–61	10–14 (4–8)	Lloyd Noble Center; Norman, Oklahoma
February 19, 1980; 7:35 pm		at Oklahoma State	L 67–69	10–15 (4–9)	Gallagher Hall (4,700); Stillwater, Oklahoma
February 23, 1980; 7:35 pm		Colorado	W 66–65	11–15 (5–9)	Hilton Coliseum; Ames, Iowa
Big Eight tournament
February 26, 1980; 7:35 pm	(7)	at (2) Kansas State; Big Eight tournament quarterfinals	L 87–101	11–16	Ahearn Fieldhouse; Manhattan, Kansas
*Non-conference game. ^{#}Rankings from AP poll. (#) Tournament seedings in parentheses. All times are in Central Time.
