= 1979–80 Kansas Jayhawks men's basketball team =

American college basketball season

1979–80 Kansas Jayhawks men's basketball
- Conference: Big Eight Conference
- Record: 15–14 (7–7 Big 8)
- Head coach: Ted Owens (16th season)
- Assistant coaches: Milt Gibson (1st season); Bob Hill (1st season); Lafayette Norwood (2nd season)
- Captains: Randolph Carroll; Mac Stallcup
- Home arena: Allen Fieldhouse

1979–80 Big Eight Conference men's basketball standings
	Conf.				Overall
Team	W		L	PCT	W		L	PCT
No. 16 Missouri	11	–	3	.786	25	–	6	.806
Kansas State †	8	–	6	.571	22	–	9	.710
Nebraska	8	–	6	.571	18	–	13	.581
Kansas	7	–	7	.500	15	–	14	.517
Colorado	7	–	7	.500	17	–	10	.630
Oklahoma	6	–	8	.429	15	–	12	.556
Iowa State	5	–	9	.357	11	–	16	.407
Oklahoma State	4	–	10	.286	10	–	17	.370
† 1980 Big Eight tournament winner Rankings from AP Poll

The 1979–80 Kansas Jayhawks men's basketball team represented the University of Kansas during the 1979–80 NCAA Division I men's basketball season.

== Roster ==
- Darnell Valentine
- Ricky Ross
- Tony Guy
- John Crawford
- Douglas Booty Neal
- Dave Magley
- Chester Giles
- Keith Douglas
- Art Housey
- Kelly Knight
- Randolph Carroll
- Mark Snow
- Mac Stallcup
- Mark Knight
- George Thompson

== Schedule ==
Date time, TV	Rank^{#}	Opponent^{#}	Result	Record	Site city, state
November 29*	No. 20	Nevada	W 93-75	1-0	Allen Fieldhouse; Lawrence, KS
December 3*	No. 20	at Oral Roberts	L 72-75	1-1	Mabee Center; Tulsa, OK
December 5*	No. 19	at SMU	L 88-89	1-2	Moody Coliseum; University Park, TX
December 8*	No. 19	San Diego State	W 79-66	2-2	Allen Fieldhouse; Lawrence, KS
December 10*	No. 19	Cal State Bakersfield	W 93-53	3-2	Allen Fieldhouse; Lawrence, KS
December 12*		No. 5 Kentucky	L 56-57	3-3	Allen Fieldhouse; Lawrence, KS
December 22*		Birmingham—Southern	W 90-64	4-3	Allen Fieldhouse; Lawrence, KS
December 27*		at Pepperdine	L 89-96	4-4	Firestone Fieldhouse; Malibu, CA
December 29*		at Arizona State	L 65-73	4-5	Wells Fargo Arena; Tempe, AZ
December 31*		at Arizona	W 78-60	5-5	McKale Center; Tucson, AZ
January 5*		Wisconsin-Oshkosh	W 109-72	6-5	Allen Fieldhouse; Lawrence, KS
January 9		No. 13 Missouri; Border War	W 69-66	7-5 (1-0)	Allen Fieldhouse; Lawrence, KS
January 12		at Iowa State	L 66-68	7-6 (1-1)	James H. Hilton Coliseum; Ames, IA
January 16		at Nebraska	L 57-64	7-7 (1-2)	Bob Devaney Sports Center; Lincoln, NE
January 19		Kansas State; Sunflower Showdown	L 52-61	7-8 (1-3)	Allen Fieldhouse; Lawrence, KS
January 23*		at Oklahoma	W 72-67	8-8 (2-3)	Lloyd Noble Center; Norman, OK
January 26		Colorado	W 75-61	9-8 (3-3)	Allen Fieldhouse; Lawrence, KS
January 30		at Oklahoma State	L 67-71	9-9 (3-4)	Gallagher-Iba Arena; Stillwater, OK
February 2		Iowa State	W 72-61	10-9 (4-4)	Allen Fieldhouse; Lawrence, KS
February 5		Nebraska	L 56-61	10-10 (4-5)	Allen Fieldhouse; Lawrence, KS
February 7*		at Iona	L 77-81	10-11	Madison Square Garden; New York, NY
February 9		at No. 15 Missouri; Border War	L 65-88	10-12 (4-6)	Hearnes Center; Columbia, MO
February 13		Oklahoma	W 69-66	11-12 (5-6)	Allen Fieldhouse; Lawrence, KS
February 16		at No. 19 Kansas State	W 48-46	12-12 (6-6)	Ahearn Field House; Manhattan, KS
February 20		at Colorado	L 72-81	12-13 (6-7)	Coors Events/Conference Center; Boulder, CO
February 23		Oklahoma State	W 84-74	13-13 (7-7)	Allen Fieldhouse; Lawrence, KS
February 26		vs. Colorado; Big Eight Conference men's basketball tournament quarterfinals	W 75-65	14-13	Kemper Arena; Kansas City, MO
February 27		vs. No. 11 Missouri; Big Eight Conference men's basketball tournament semifinals Border War	W 80-71	15-13	Kemper Arena; Kansas City, MO
February 28		vs. Kansas State; Big Eight Conference men's basketball tournament championship Game; Sunflower Showdown	L 58-79	15-14	Kemper Arena; Kansas City, MO
*Non-conference game. ^{#}Rankings from AP Poll. (#) Tournament seedings in parentheses.
