= 1979–80 Cincinnati Bearcats men's basketball team =

American college basketball season

1979–80 Cincinnati Bearcats men's basketball
- Conference: Metro Conference (1975–1995)
- Record: 13–15 (3–9 Metro)
- Head coach: Ed Badger
- Home arena: Riverfront Coliseum

1979–80 Metro Conference men's basketball standings
	Conf.				Overall
Team	W		L	PCT	W		L	PCT
No. 2 Louisville †	12	–	0	1.000	33	–	3	.917
Virginia Tech	8	–	4	.667	21	–	8	.724
Florida State	7	–	5	.583	22	–	9	.710
Memphis State	5	–	7	.417	13	–	14	.481
Saint Louis	4	–	8	.333	12	–	15	.444
Cincinnati	3	–	9	.250	13	–	15	.464
Tulane	3	–	9	.250	10	–	17	.370
† 1980 Metro Conference tournament winner Rankings from AP Poll

The 1979–80 Cincinnati Bearcats men's basketball team represented the University of Cincinnati during the 1979–80 NCAA men's basketball season.

== Roster ==
1979–80 Cincinnati Bearcats men's basketball team
Players
Coaches

Pos.	#	Name	Height	Weight	Year	Hometown
G		Jeff Bentley	6 ft 4 in (1.93 m)	190 lb (86 kg)	Sr	Mason, Ohio
G		David Kennedy	6 ft 2 in (1.88 m)	170 lb (77 kg)	Jr	Pittsburgh, PA
G		Eddie Lee	6 ft 4 in (1.93 m)	185 lb (84 kg)	Sr	Queens, New York

Head coach

- Ed Badger

Assistant coach(es)

Legend

- (C) Team captain
- (S) Suspended
- (I) Ineligible
- (W) Walk-on
- Injured
- Current redshirt

== Schedule ==
Date time, TV	Rank^{#}	Opponent^{#}	Result	Record	Site city, state
November 30*		vs. Mississippi State	L 72–87	0–1	Mississippi Coast Coliseum; Biloxi, Mississippi
December 1*		vs. Southern Mississippi	L 84–86	0–2	Mississippi Coast Coliseum; Biloxi, Mississippi
December 6*		Augustana (SD)	W 78–62	1–2	Riverfront Coliseum; Cincinnati, Ohio
December 8*		at North Carolina	L 62–68	1–3	Carmichael Auditorium; Chapel Hill, NC
December 12*		Miami (OH)	W 75–73	2–3	Riverfront Coliseum; Cincinnati, Ohio
December 17*		Cal Poly SLO	W 82–57	3–3	Riverfront Coliseum; Cincinnati, Ohio
December 19*		Pittsburgh	W 61–60	4–3	Riverfront Coliseum; Cincinnati, Ohio
December 22*		Temple	W 68–64	5–3	Riverfront Coliseum; Cincinnati, Ohio
December 28*		vs. South Carolina	W 69–62	6–3	Cameron Indoor Stadium; Durham, NC
December 29*		at Duke	L 75–87 ^{OT}	6–4	Cameron Indoor Stadium; Durham, NC
January 5*		at Dayton	W 69–68	7–4	University of Dayton Arena; Dayton, Ohio
January 7		Memphis	W 74–64	8–4 (1–0)	Riverfront Coliseum; Cincinnati, Ohio
January 16		Tulane	W 59–58	9–4 (2–0)	Riverfront Coliseum; Cincinnati, Ohio
January 19		Virginia Tech	L 59–61	9–5 (2–1)	Riverfront Coliseum; Cincinnati, Ohio
January 22		St. Louis	W 71–57	10–5 (3–1)	Riverfront Coliseum; Cincinnati, Ohio
January 26		at Virginia Tech	L 57–97	10–6 (3–2)	Cassell Coliseum; Blacksburg, Virginia
January 28		at Tulane	L 64–69	10–7 (3–3)	Avron B. Fogelman Arena; New Orleans, Louisiana
February 2		Florida State	L 52–54	10–8 (3–4)	Riverfront Coliseum; Cincinnati, Ohio
February 4*		at Xavier	L 69–77	10–9 (3–4)	Schmidt Fieldhouse; Cincinnati, Ohio
February 6		at No. 3 Louisville	L 73–88	10–10 (3–5)	Freedom Hall; Louisville, Kentucky
February 9		at Florida State	L 74–77	10–11 (3–6)	Tully Gymnasium; Tallahassee, Florida
February 14		at Memphis	L 59–61	10–12 (3–7)	Mid-South Coliseum; Memphis, Tennessee
February 16		Louisville	L 73–88	10–13 (3–8)	Riverfront Coliseum; Cincinnati, Ohio
February 18*		Loyola (IL)	W 75–70	11–13 (3–8)	Riverfront Coliseum; Cincinnati, Ohio
February 21		at St. Louis	L 86–92	11–14 (3–9)	The Checkerdome; St. Louis, Missouri
February 26*		North Carolina A&T	W 72–64	11–15 (3–9)	Riverfront Coliseum; Cincinnati, Ohio
Metro Tournament
February 28		vs. Virginia Tech	W 65–51	12–15 (3–9)	Freedom Hall; Louisville, Kentucky
March 1		vs. Florida State	L 69–79	12–16 (3–9)	Freedom Hall; Louisville, Kentucky
*Non-conference game. ^{#}Rankings from AP Poll. (#) Tournament seedings in parentheses.
