= Bill Varner =

American-Belgian basketball player

Personal information
- Born: August 1, 1960 (age 66) Pittsburgh, Pennsylvania, U.S.
- Listed height: 6 ft 6.75 in (2.00 m)
- Listed weight: 220 lb (100 kg)

Career information
- High school: Valley (New Kensington, Pennsylvania)
- College: Notre Dame (1979–1983)
- NBA draft: 1983: 9th round, 202nd overall pick
- Drafted by: Milwaukee Bucks
- Playing career: 1983–2002
- Position: Small forward
- Number: 11, 12

Career history
- 1983–1984: Sarasota Stingers
- 1984: Wisconsin Flyers
- 1984–1986: PAOK
- 1986–1987: Olympique Antibes
- 1987–1988: Tenerife CB
- 1988–1989: BCM Gravelines-Dunkerque
- 1989–1995: R.C. Mechelen
- 1995: Montpellier Paillade Basket
- 1995–1996: Atléticos de San Germán
- 1996–1998: Club Ourense Baloncesto
- 1998: Gaiteros del Zulia
- 1998–1999: Valencia Basket
- 1999–2000: Spirou Charleroi
- 2000: Cocodrilos de Caracas
- 2000–2001: Cholet Basket
- 2001–2002: Cantabria Baloncesto

Career highlights
- French League Foreign MVP (1987); 5× Belgian League champion; 3× Belgian Cup winner
- Stats at Basketball Reference

William Joseph Varner is an American-Belgian former professional basketball player. He played on several European clubs, including R.C. Mechelen.

== College career ==
Varner played college basketball at the University of Notre Dame, with the Notre Dame Fighting Irish. After, a poor performance at his first two college years, Varner has 10 points per game at his junior season, and 11,1 points average at his senior season.

== Professional career ==
Varner played at Continental Basketball Association (CBA) during 1983–84 season, with Sarasota Stingers and Wisconsin Flyers.

In 1984 signed with P.A.O.K. BC. Varner played two years only in European Cup, but his contribution was fabulous. At 1984–85 FIBA European Cup Winners' Cup second round PAOK eliminated KK Bosna Royal and Varner scored 35 points at the first leg, and 31 at the second. At group stage PAOK lost all the games, but Varner shone with 36 and 32 points against CB Zaragoza games, and 33 against BC Žalgiris in the away game. In 1985–86 season Varner 1985–86 FIBA Korać Cup lead PAOK at group stage. At the first round after a 105–87 defeat from BC Levski Sofia, Varner scored 36 points and a goal-foul at the last second of the second game and gave the victory to his team with 104–83. At group stage Varner scored 35 against Auxilium Pallacanestro Torino, 30 against KK Zadar, and 33 against his later club Olympique Antibes.

Varner was named LNB Pro A MVP foreigner player for his performance with Olympique Antibes.

His best era of his career was with R.C. Mechelen He played six years from 1989 to 1995 and he won 6 consecutive Belgian Championships, and 3 Belgian Cups. At European competitions his best average was 24,2 points for 1991–92 FIBA European League. He also scored 39 points against CB Estudiantes on 11 February 1993. Varner was like a hero in Mechelen.

He also played in many clubs, such as Montpellier Paillade Basket, Valencia Basket, Spirou Charleroi, and Cantabria Baloncesto end his career at the age of 42.
