= 1979–80 Louisville Cardinals men's basketball team =

American college basketball season

1979–80 Louisville Cardinals men's basketball

NCAA tournament National Champions Metro Conference tournament champions Metro Conference champions

National Championship Game, W 59–54 vs. UCLA
- Conference: Metro Conference (1975–1995)

Ranking
- Coaches: No. 4
- AP: No. 2
- Record: 33–3 (12–0 Metro)
- Head coach: Denny Crum (9th season)
- Assistant coaches: Bill Olsen; Wade Houston; Jerry Jones
- Home arena: Freedom Hall

1979–80 Metro Conference men's basketball standings
	Conf.				Overall
Team	W		L	PCT	W		L	PCT
No. 2 Louisville †	12	–	0	1.000	33	–	3	.917
Virginia Tech	8	–	4	.667	21	–	8	.724
Florida State	7	–	5	.583	22	–	9	.710
Memphis State	5	–	7	.417	13	–	14	.481
Saint Louis	4	–	8	.333	12	–	15	.444
Cincinnati	3	–	9	.250	13	–	15	.464
Tulane	3	–	9	.250	10	–	17	.370
† 1980 Metro Conference tournament winner Rankings from AP Poll

The 1979–80 Louisville Cardinals men's basketball team represented the University of Louisville during the 1979–80 NCAA Division I men's basketball season, Louisville's 66th season of intercollegiate competition. The Cardinals competed in the Metro Conference and were coached by Denny Crum. The team played home games at Freedom Hall.

The team completed a 33–3 record and brought Louisville basketball their first NCAA national championship when they defeated UCLA 59–54, led by Darrell Griffith and his 23 points.

== Roster ==
1979–80 Louisville Cardinals men's basketball team
Players
Coaches

Pos.	#	Name	Height	Weight	Year	Previous school	Hometown
G	5	Jerry Eaves	6 ft 4 in (1.93 m)	180 lb (82 kg)	So	Ballard	Louisville, Kentucky
G	15	Greg Deuser	6 ft 0 in (1.83 m)	170 lb (77 kg)	So	Floyd Central	New Albany, Indiana
F	21	Scooter McCray	6 ft 8 in (2.03 m)	185 lb (84 kg)	So	Mount Vernon	Mount Vernon, New York
F/C	22	Rodney McCray	6 ft 7 in (2.01 m)	220 lb (100 kg)	Fr	Mount Vernon	Mount Vernon, New York
G	23	Tony Branch (C)	6 ft 0 in (1.83 m)	175 lb (79 kg)	Sr	Elston	Michigan City, Indiana
F	24	Daryl Cleveland	6 ft 7 in (2.01 m)	190 lb (86 kg)	Jr	Thomas County Central	Thomasville, Georgia
G	34	Roger Burkman	6 ft 5 in (1.96 m)	175 lb (79 kg)	Jr	Franklin Central	Indianapolis, Indiana
G	35	Darrell Griffith (C)	6 ft 4 in (1.93 m)	190 lb (86 kg)	Sr	Louisville Male	Louisville, Kentucky
C	40	Marty Pulliam	6 ft 9 in (2.06 m)	225 lb (102 kg)	So	Mercer Country Senior	Harrodsburg, Kentucky
C	41	Wiley Brown	6 ft 8 in (2.03 m)	220 lb (100 kg)	So	Worth County	Sylvester, Georgia
F	43	Derek Smith	6 ft 6 in (1.98 m)	205 lb (93 kg)	So	Hogansville	Hogansville, Georgia
G/F	44	Poncho Wright	6 ft 5 in (1.96 m)	195 lb (88 kg)	So	Marshall	Indianapolis, Indiana
F	25	Steve Clark (W)	6 ft 5 in (1.96 m)	196 lb (89 kg)	Fr	Thomas Jefferson	Louisville, Kentucky

Head coach

- Denny Crum (UCLA)

Assistant coach(es)

- Jerry Jones
- Bill Olsen
- Wade Houston

Legend

- (C) Team captain
- (S) Suspended
- (I) Ineligible
- (W) Walk-on
- Injured
- Current redshirt

== Schedule ==
Date time, TV	Rank^{#}	Opponent^{#}	Result	Record	Site city, state
Regular Season
December 1*	No. 10	South Alabama	W 75–73	1–0	Freedom Hall; Louisville, Kentucky
December 5*	No. 14	Tennessee Chattanooga	W 87–63	2–0	Freedom Hall; Louisville, Kentucky
December 8*	No. 14	at Tennessee	W 77–75	3–0	Stokely Athletic Center; Knoxville, Tennessee
December 13*	No. 12	UNC-Charlotte; Holiday Classic	W 93–76	4–0	Freedom Hall; Louisville, Kentucky
December 14*	No. 12	Western Kentucky; Holiday Classic	W 96–74	5–0	Freedom Hall; Louisville, Kentucky
December 19*	No. 11	No. 2 Ohio State	W 75–65	6–0	Freedom Hall; Louisville, Kentucky
December 22*	No. 11	at Utah	L 69–71	6–1	Jon M. Huntsman Center; Salt Lake City
December 28*	No. 12	vs. Princeton; Hawaii Rainbow Classic	W 64–53	7–1	Honolulu, Hawaii
December 29*	No. 12	vs. Illinois; Hawaii Rainbow Classic	L 65–77	7–2	Honolulu, Hawaii
December 30*	No. 12	vs. Nebraska; Hawaii Rainbow Classic	W 65–58	8–2	Honalulu, Hawaii
January 3	No. 15	at Tulsa	W 78–58	9–2	Freedom Hall; Louisville, Kentucky
January 5	No. 15	Kansas St.	W 85–73	10–2	Freedom Hall; Louisville, Kentucky
January 8	No. 11	St. Louis	W 94–65	11–2 (1–0)	Freedom Hall; Louisville, Kentucky
January 12	No. 11	at Memphis St.	W 69–48	12–2 (2–0)	Mid-South Coliseum; Memphis, Tennessee
January 19	No. 7	at Tulane	W 76–59	13–2 (3–0)	Avron B. Fogelman Arena; New Orleans
January 22	No. 7	Marquette	W 76–63	14–2 (3–0)	Freedom Hall; Louisville, Kentucky
January 25	No. 7	at St. Louis	W 99–74	15–2 (4–0)	Kiel Auditorium; St. Louis
January 27	No. 7	Florida St.	W 79–73	16–2 (5–0)	Freedom Hall; Louisville, Kentucky
January 31	No. 7	Tulane	W 64–60	17–2 (6–0)	Freedom Hall; Louisville, Kentucky
February 3	No. 7	at No. 9 St. John's	W 76–71	18–2 (6–0)	Alumni Hall; Queens, New York
February 4	No. 7	Memphis St.	W 88–60	19–2 (7–0)	Freedom Hall; Louisville, Kentucky
February 6	No. 3	Cincinnati	W 88–73	20–2 (8–0)	Freedom Hall; Louisville, Kentucky
February 9	No. 3	at Providence	W 79–73	21–2 (8–0)	Providence Civic Center; Providence, Rhode Island
February 11	No. 3	at Virginia Tech	W 56–54 ^{OT}	22–2 (9–0)	Cassell Coliseum; Blacksburg, Virginia
February 14	No. 3	at West Virginia	W 90–78	23–2 (9–0)	WVU Coliseum; Morgantown, West Virginia
February 16	No. 3	at Cincinnati	W 61–57	24–2 (10–0)	Riverfront Coliseum; Cincinnati, Ohio
February 18	No. 3	Virginia Tech	W 77–72	25–2 (11–0)	Freedom Hall; Louisville, Kentucky
February 21	No. 2	vs. Iona	L 60–77	25–3 (11–0)	Madison Square Garden; New York City
February 24	No. 2	at Florida St.	W 83–75	26–3 (12–0)	Tallahassee, Florida
1980 Metro Conference tournament
February 29	No. 4	Memphis St. Metro Conference tournament Semi-Final	W 84–65	27–3 (12–0)	Freedom Hall; Louisville, Kentucky
March 1 Tanner Sports Network	No. 4	Florida St. Metro Conference tournament championship	W 81–72	28–3 (12–0)	Freedom Hall; Louisville, Kentucky
1980 NCAA Division I men's basketball tournament
March 8	No. 2 (MW2)	vs. No. MW7 Kansas St. Second Round	W 71–69 ^{OT}	29–3 (12–0)	Devaney Center; Lincoln, Nebraska
March 14	No. 2 (MW2)	vs. No. MW6 Texas A&M; Midwest Regional Semi-Final (Sweet Sixteen)	W 66–55 ^{OT}	30–3 (12–0)	The Summit; Houston, Texas
March 16	No. 2 (MW2)	vs. No. 3 (MW1) Louisiana St. Midwest Regional Championship (Elite Eight)	W 86–66	31–3 (12–0)	The Summit; Houston, Texas
March 22	No. 2 (MW2)	vs. No. E5 Iowa; National semifinal (Final Four)	W 80–72	32–3 (12–0)	Market Square Arena; Indianapolis
March 24*	No. 2 (MW2)	vs. No. W8 UCLA; National Championship Game	W 59–54	33–3 (12–0)	Market Square Arena; Indianapolis
*Non-conference game. ^{#}Rankings from AP Poll. (#) Tournament seedings in parentheses.

== Rankings ==
Ranking movements Legend: ██ Increase in ranking ██ Decrease in ranking
	Week														
Poll	Pre	1	2	3	4	5	6	7	8	9	10	11	12	13	Final
AP	10	14	12	11	12	15	11	7	7	7	3	3	2	4	2

== NCAA basketball tournament ==
=== Midwest region ===
First round
8	Alcorn State	70
9	South Alabama	62
5	Missouri	61
12	San Jose State	51
6	Texas A&M	55
11	Bradley	53
7	Kansas State	71
10	Arkansas	53

Second round
8	Alcorn State	88
1	LSU	98
4	Notre Dame	84*
5	Missouri	87
6	Texas A&M	78
3	North Carolina	61**
2	Louisville	71
7	Kansas State	69*

Regional semifinals
1	LSU	68
5	Missouri	63
6	Texas A&M	55*
2	Louisville	66

Regional Finals
1	LSU	66
2	Louisville	86

=== Final Four ===
National semifinals
E5	Iowa	72
MW2	Louisville	80
ME6	Purdue	62
W8	UCLA	67

National Finals
MW2	Louisville	59
W8	UCLA	54
National third-place game
E5	Iowa	58
ME6	Purdue	75

== Awards and honors ==
- Darrell Griffith, NCAA Men's MOP Award
- Darrell Griffith, All-America selection

== Team players drafted into the NBA ==
Year	Round	Pick	Player	NBA club
1980	1	2	Darrell Griffith	Utah Jazz
1983	2	36	Scooter McCray	Seattle SuperSonics
1983	1	3	Rodney McCray	Houston Rockets
1982	2	35	Derek Smith	Golden State Warriors
