= Pepper Tanner =

Radio syndication company

Pepper Sound Studios
- Industry: Radio Program Syndication
- Predecessor: Pepper-Tanner; The William B. Tanner Company
- Founded: 1957; 69 years ago
- Founder: Floyd Huddleston; John Pepper and songwriter
- Defunct: 1982
- Fate: Acquired by Media General
- Headquarters: United States

Pepper Sound Studios was an early syndicator of radio station jingles and began sometime in 1957. It began as a record company created by businessman John Pepper and songwriter Floyd Huddleston. Huddleston based the company on the model of Capitol Records and even brought in Johnny Mercer as a consultant. Composers Al Rinker and Willard Robison were hired, until the record end was eventually phased out, and by 1964, Pepper Studios exclusively become a Jingle Commercial company. Their first jingle was for John Pepper's company Everdry Deodorant, followed by Burke Hall Paint and hundreds of others. William Tanner was a salesman for the company and quickly worked his way into becoming one of the owners of the company, and Pepper and Tanner worked Floyd Huddleston out. The company became known as Pepper-Tanner about 1967. In 1972, Bill Tanner worked John Pepper out the same way he had Huddleston, and the name was changed once again to The William B. Tanner Company, or simply Tanner for short.

In 1982, Media General, owner of newspapers as well as broadcasting and cable TV companies, bought the William B. Tanner Company for cash. David L. Jordan, vice president of Media General, said it was primarily interested in Tanner because of its expertise in the programming area.

Some of the stations that commissioned Pepper Tanner jingles were WPOP, WLIF, WLS, WOLF, WVLK and WPGC.

It was later divested in 1988 and the ID jingles, syndication reels and production libraries of Media General Broadcast Services were acquired by TM Studios. Media General’s operations in Memphis was shut down and the master backing tracks and sound libraries were boxed up and shipped to the TM studios in Dallas. All of the reference reels for the syndicated ID Jingles and customized production libraries and commercials were dumped in Memphis. TM Studios has placed these reels in the custody of Media Preservation Foundation, though the copyrights are retained by TM Studios. The production libraries were cherry-picked and incorporated in various TM Studios libraries still sold to this day via TM and, until his death (January 9, 2013, in Plano, Texas, age 63), by Ben Freedman Productions.
