= 1979–80 Fordham Rams men's basketball team =

American college basketball season

1979–80 Fordham Rams men's basketball
- Conference: Independent
- Record: 11–17
- Head coach: Tom Penders (2nd season)
- Home arena: Rose Hill Gymnasium

1979–80 ECAC Metro men's basketball standings
	Conf.				Overall
Team	W		L	PCT	W		L	PCT
No. 19 Iona		–		–	28	–	4	.875
Saint Peter's		–		–	22	–	9	.710
Long Island		–		–	14	–	12	.538
Wagner		–		–	14	–	13	.519
Siena		–		–	14	–	14	.500
Fairleigh Dickinson		–		–	13	–	14	.481
St. Francis (NY)		–		–	11	–	15	.423
Fairfield		–		–	11	–	16	.407
Fordham		–		–	11	–	17	.393
Army		–		–	9	–	17	.346
Manhattan		–		–	4	–	22	.154
† 1980 ECAC Metro tournament winner Rankings from AP poll *Iona vacated NCAA Tournament games due to NCAA sanctions. Disputed record (29–5)

The 1979–80 Fordham Rams men's basketball team represented Fordham University during the 1979–80 NCAA Division I men's basketball season. The team was coached by Tom Penders in his second year at the school. Fordham's home games were played at Rose Hill Gymnasium and were an Independent.

== Roster ==
1979–80 Fordham Rams men's basketball team
Players
Coaches

Pos.	#	Name	Height	Weight	Year	Hometown
G	10	Mark Murphy	6 ft 1 in (1.85 m)	170 lb (77 kg)	Fr	Manchester, Connecticut
G	11	Mike Murphy	5 ft 10 in (1.78 m)	165 lb (75 kg)	Sr	Norristown, Pennsylvania
G	12	Craig Dowell	6 ft 0 in (1.83 m)	160 lb (73 kg)	Jr	Kinnelon, New Jersey
G	22	Bill Lombardi	6 ft 1 in (1.85 m)	183 lb (83 kg)	Sr	Queens, New York

Head coach

- Tom Penders (Connecticut)

Assistant coach(es)

Legend

- (C) Team captain
- (S) Suspended
- (I) Ineligible
- (W) Walk-on
- Injured
- Current redshirt

Roster

== Schedule ==
Date time, TV	Rank^{#}	Opponent^{#}	Result	Record	Site city, state
December 1		at Wagner	L 59–64	0–1 (0–1)	Sutter Gymnasium; Staten Island, NY
December 4*		at Yale	L 102–106 ^{2OT}	0–2 (0–1)	Payne Whitney Gymnasium; New Haven, Connecticut
December 8*		Harvard	W 81–78	1–2 (0–1)	Rose Hill Gymnasium; The Bronx, New York
December 12*		Princeton	L 43–53	1–3 (0–1)	Rose Hill Gymnasium; The Bronx, New York
December 14*		at Tennessee	L 63–88	1–4 (0–1)	Stokely Athletic Center; Knoxville, Tennessee
December 15*		vs. Santa Clara	W 73–64	2–4 (0–1)	Stokely Athletic Center; Knoxville, Tennessee
December 22		at Manhattan	W 71–65	3–4 (1–1)	Draddy Gymnasium; The Bronx, NY
December 28		vs. UC-Santa Barbara	L 64–65	3–5 (1–1)	Worthington Arena; Bozeman, Montana
December 29		vs. Valparaiso	L 84–87	3–6 (1–1)	Worthington Arena; Bozeman, Montana
January 3		Saint Peter's	L 34–59	3–7 (1–2)	Rose Hill Gymnasium; The Bronx, New York
January 9		at Vermont	W 66–63	4–7 (2–2)	Roy L. Patrick Gymnasium; Burlington, Vermont
January 12*		Boston College	L 47–60	4–8 (2–2)	Rose Hill Gymnasium; The Bronx, New York
January 15*		at Connecticut	L 53–66	4–9 (2–2)	Hartford Civic Center; Hartford, Connecticut
January 19*		Cornell	W 81–41	4–9 (2–2)	Rose Hill Gymnasium; The Bronx, New York
January 21*		Marist	W 91–79	4–10 (2–2)	Rose Hill Gymnasium; The Bronx, New York
January 26*		at Navy	L 63–72	4–11 (2–2)	Halsey Field House; Annapolis, Maryland
January 29*		Columbia	W 64–57	5–11 (2–2)	Rose Hill Gymnasium; The Bronx, NY
February 2		Iona	L 59–65	5–12 (2–3)	Rose Hill Gymnasium; The Bronx, NY
February 4*		at Army	W 62–58	6–12 (3–3)	USMA Fieldhouse; West Point, NY
February 6*		at Fairfield	W 85–70	7–12 (3–3)	Alumni Hall; Fairfield, Connecticut
February 9*		at St. John's (NY)	L 60–78	7–13 (3–3)	Alumni Hall; Queens, New York
February 12*		at Seton Hall	L 57–62	7–14 (3–3)	Walsh Gymnasium; South Orange, NJ
February 14*		Notre Dame	L 76–86	7–15 (3–3)	Rose Hill Gymnasium; The Bronx, NY
February 16*		Rutgers	W 42–39	8–15 (3–3)	Rose Hill Gymnasium; The Bronx, NY
February 19		Long Island University	L 55–62	8–16 (3–4)	Rose Hill Gymnasium; The Bronx, NY
February 21*		at Holy Cross	L 72–83	8–17 (3–4)	Hart Recreation Center; Worcester, Massachusetts
ECAC Metro tournament
February 28		at Wagner	W 73–67	9–17	Sutter Gymnasium; Staten Island, NY
February 29		vs. Saint Peter's	L 47–65	9–18	Alumni Hall; Queens, New York
*Non-conference game. ^{#}Rankings from AP Poll. (#) Tournament seedings in parentheses.
