= 1979–80 Richmond Spiders men's basketball team =

American college basketball season

1979–80 Richmond Spiders men's basketball
- Conference: ECAC South
- Record: 13–14 (4–3 ECAC South)
- Head coach: Lou Goetz (2nd season)
- Home arena: Robins Center

1979–80 ECAC South men's basketball standings
	Conf.				Overall
Team	W		L	PCT	W		L	PCT
Old Dominion †	-	–	-	–	25	–	5	.833
James Madison	-	–	-	–	18	–	8	.692
Navy	-	–	-	–	14	–	13	.519
Richmond	4	–	3	.571	13	–	14	.481
Baltimore	-	–	-	–	12	–	15	.444
William & Mary	-	–	-	–	12	–	15	.444
St. Francis (PA)	-	–	-	–	12	–	16	.429
Towson State	-	–	-	–	9	–	17	.346
Catholic	-	–	-	–	8	–	19	.296
Robert Morris	-	–	-	–	7	–	19	.269
George Mason	-	–	-	–	5	–	21	.192
† 1980 ECAC South tournament winner Rankings from AP Poll

The 1979–80 Richmond Spiders men's basketball team represented the University of Richmond in National Collegiate Athletic Association (NCAA) Division I college basketball during the 1979–80 season. Richmond competed as a member of the ECAC South under senond-year head basketball coach Lou Goetz and played its home games at the Robins Center.

Junior forward Michael Perry was the team's leading scorer with 19.1 points 6.1 rounds and John Schweitz with 17.7 points and 3.0 assists.

== Schedule and results ==
Date time, TV	Rank^{#}	Opponent^{#}	Result	Record	Site city, state
Regular season
Nov 30, 1979*		West Virginia Tech	W 114–96	1–0	Robins Center; Richmond, Virginia
Dec 1, 1979*		VCU; Spider Classic	L 67–69	1–1	Robins Center; Richmond, Virginia
Dec 3, 1979*		Bluefield	W 132–69	2–1	Robins Center; Richmond, Virginia
Dec 5, 1979		George Mason	W 105–70	3–1 (1–0)	Robins Center; Richmond, Virginia
Dec 7, 1979*		vs. Connecticut; Utah Classic	L 79–81	3–2 (1–0)	Jon M. Huntsman Center; Salt Lake City, Utah
Dec 8, 1979*		vs. Cal State Fullerton; Utah Classic	W 84–75	4–2 (1–0)	Jon M. Huntsman Center; Salt Lake City, Utah
Dec 19, 1979*		vs. Wake Forest	L 75–92	4–3 (1–0)	Winston-Salem Memorial Coliseum; Winston-Salem, NC
Dec 22, 1979*		George Washington	L 78–86	4–4 (1–0)	Robins Center; Richmond, Virginia
Dec 28, 1979		Old Dominion; Richmond Times-Dispatch Invitational	L 84–90	4–5 (1–1)	Robins Center; Richmond, Virginia
Dec 29, 1979*		VCU; Richmond Times-Dispatch Invitational	L 71–86	4–6 (1–1)	Robins Center; Richmond, Virginia
Jan 2, 1980*		at South Florida	W 83–64	5–6 (1–1)	Bayfront Center; St. Petersburg, Florida
Jan 4, 1980		vs. St. Francis (PA); Citrus Invitational	W 90–89	6–6 (2–1)	Lakeland Civic Center; Lakeland, Florida
Jan 5, 1980*		vs. Florida Southern; Citrus Invitational	L 67–68	6–7 (2–1)	Lakeland Civic Center; Lakeland, Florida
Jan 9, 1980*		Oglethorpe	W 101–85	7–7 (2–1)	Robins Center; Richmond, Virginia
Jan 14, 1980		Baltimore	W 77–56	8–7 (3–1)	Robins Center; Richmond, Virginia
Jan 16, 1980		James Madison	W 64–50	9–7 (4–1)	Robins Center; Richmond, Virginia
Jan 19, 1980		at William & Mary	L 81–82	9–8 (4–2)	Kaplan Arena at William and Mary Hall; Williamsburg, Virginia
Jan 23, 1980*		Upsala	W 92–86	10–8 (4–2)	Robins Center; Richmond, Virginia
Jan 26, 1980*		at Penn	L 78–84	10–9 (4–2)	Palestra; Philadelphia, Pennsylvania
Jan 28, 1980*		at Penn State	L 61–71	10–10 (4–2)	Rec Hall; University Park, Pennsylvania
Jan 31, 1980		Towson State	L 83–88	10–11 (4–3)	Robins Center; Richmond, Virginia
Feb 2, 1980*		VMI	W 104–92	11–11 (3–3)	Robins Center; Richmond, Virginia
Feb 9, 1980		William & Mary	L 74–83	11–12 (3–4)	Robins Center; Richmond, Virginia
Feb 14, 1980*		at Long Island	L 70–78	11–13 (3–4)	Schwartz Athletic Center; Brooklyn, New York
Feb 16, 1980*		at Niagara	W 67–65	12–13 (3–4)	Niagara Falls Convention Center; Niagara Falls, NY
Feb 20, 1980*		VCU	W 76–67	13–13 (3–4)	Robins Center; Richmond, Virginia
ECAC South tournament
Feb 28, 1980	(4)	(5) William & Mary; Quarterfinals	L 77–78	13–14 (3–4)	Robins Center; Richmond, Virginia
*Non-conference game. ^{#}Rankings from AP poll. (#) Tournament seedings in parentheses. All times are in Eastern.
