= 1979–80 Iona Gaels men's basketball team =

American college basketball season

1979–80 Iona Gaels men's basketball

ECAC Metro tournament champions

NCAA tournament, Second Round
- Conference: Metro Atlantic Athletic Conference

Ranking
- AP: No. 19
- Record: 29–5 ( ECAC Metro)
- Head coach: Jim Valvano (5th season)
- Home arena: Hynes Athletic Center

1979–80 ECAC Metro men's basketball standings
	Conf.				Overall
Team	W		L	PCT	W		L	PCT
No. 19 Iona		–		–	28	–	4	.875
Saint Peter's		–		–	22	–	9	.710
Long Island		–		–	14	–	12	.538
Wagner		–		–	14	–	13	.519
Siena		–		–	14	–	14	.500
Fairleigh Dickinson		–		–	13	–	14	.481
St. Francis (NY)		–		–	11	–	15	.423
Fairfield		–		–	11	–	16	.407
Fordham		–		–	11	–	17	.393
Army		–		–	9	–	17	.346
Manhattan		–		–	4	–	22	.154
† 1980 ECAC Metro tournament winner Rankings from AP poll *Iona vacated NCAA Tournament games due to NCAA sanctions. Disputed record (29–5)

The 1979–80 Iona Gaels men's basketball team represented Iona College during the 1979–80 NCAA Division I men's basketball season. The Gaels, led by fifth-year head coach Jim Valvano, played their home games at the Hynes Athletic Center. The Gaels won the ECAC Metro Basketball tournament to receive a bid to the 1980 NCAA tournament. As the No. 6 seed in the East region, the Gaels defeated No. 11 seed Holy Cross in the opening round – the first and only NCAA Tournament victory in school history. Iona was narrowly defeated by No. 3 seed Georgetown in the round of 32. As of the 2020–21 NCAA Division I men's basketball season, this is the furthest any Iona men's team has ever advanced in the NCAA Tournament.

On February 21, Iona halted No. 2 Louisville’s 18-game winning streak by dominating the Cardinals, 77–60, at Madison Square Garden. It was the last game Louisville would lose during the season en route to winning the 1980 NCAA Championship. It was the 12th straight of what would end up being a 17-game win streak for the Gaels.

== Roster ==
1979–80 Iona Gaels men's basketball team
Players
Coaches

Pos.	#	Name	Height	Weight	Year	Hometown
G	14	Kevin Hamilton	6 ft 3 in (1.91 m)	—	Sr
G		Glenn Vickers	6 ft 1 in (1.85 m)	—	Sr
C	43	Jeff Ruland	6 ft 10 in (2.08 m)	230 lb (104 kg)	Jr	Sachem HS	Lake Ronkonkoma, New York

Head coach

- Jim Valvano

Assistant coach(es)

Legend

- (C) Team captain
- (S) Suspended
- (I) Ineligible
- (W) Walk-on
- Injured
- Current redshirt

Roster

== Schedule and results ==
Date time, TV	Rank^{#}	Opponent^{#}	Result	Record	Site (attendance) city, state
Regular season
Nov 30, 1979*		vs. No. 14 Texas A&M; Great Alaska Shootout	W 78–52	1–0	Buckner Fieldhouse; Anchorage, Alaska
Dec 1, 1979*		vs. Long Beach State; Great Alaska Shootout	W 86–75	2–0	Buckner Fieldhouse; Anchorage, Alaska
Dec 2, 1979*		vs. No. 2 Kentucky; Great Alaska Shootout	L 50–57	2–1	Buckner Fieldhouse; Anchorage, Alaska
Dec 8, 1979*		at Saint Mary's	W 79–73	3–1	McKeon Pavilion; Moraga, California
Dec 11, 1979*		at San Francisco	L 66–76	3–2	War Memorial Gymnasium; San Francisco, California
Dec 15, 1979*		Fairleigh Dickinson	W 75–58	4–2	Hynes Athletic Center; New Rochelle, New York
Dec 23, 1979*		Belmont Abbey	W 54–48	5–2	Hynes Athletic Center; New Rochelle, New York
Dec 28, 1979*		Air Force; Iona Classic	W 64–51	6–2	Hynes Athletic Center; New Rochelle, New York
Dec 29, 1979*		St. Bonaventure; Iona Classic	W 75–67	7–2	Hynes Athletic Center; New Rochelle, New York
Jan 3, 1980*		Wichita State	W 84–70	8–2	Hynes Athletic Center; New Rochelle, New York
Jan 5, 1980*		at No. 18 Georgetown	L 84–95	8–3	McDonough Gymnasium (3,805); Washington, D.C.
Jan 7, 1980*		Baltimore	W 68–51	9–3	Hynes Athletic Center; New Rochelle, New York
Jan 12, 1980*		at Alabama-Birmingham	W 70–65	10–3	Birmingham-Jefferson Civic Center; Birmingham, Alabama
Jan 17, 1980*		McNeese State	W 76–66	11–3	Hynes Athletic Center; New Rochelle, New York
Jan 19, 1980*		at Niagara	W 88–74	12–3	Niagara Falls Convention Center; Lewiston, New York
Jan 21, 1980*		at Pittsburgh	L 63–75	12–4	Fitzgerald Field House; Pittsburgh, Pennsylvania
Jan 23, 1980*		Colgate	W 54–49	13–4	Hynes Athletic Center; New Rochelle, New York
Jan 26, 1980*		at Holy Cross	W 82–67	14–4	Hart Center; Worcester, Massachusetts
Jan 30, 1980*		at Wagner	W 77–73	15–4	Sutter Gymnasium; Staten Island, New York
Feb 2, 1980*		at Fordham	W 65–59	16–4	Rose Hill Gym; Bronx, New York
Feb 4, 1980*		Saint Peter's	W 65–62	17–4	Hynes Athletic Center; New Rochelle, New York
Feb 7, 1980*		Kansas	W 81–77	18–4	Madison Square Garden; New York, New York
Feb 9, 1980*		Army	W 67–54	19–4	Hynes Athletic Center; New Rochelle, New York
Feb 11, 1980*		Saint Francis (PA)	W 72–62	20–4	Hynes Athletic Center; New Rochelle, New York
Feb 14, 1980*		at Manhattan	W 70–57	21–4	Draddy Gymnasium; New York, New York
Feb 16, 1980*		at Long Island University	W 85–72	22–4	Schwartz Athletic Center
Feb 18, 1980*		Siena	W 84–72	23–4	Hynes Athletic Center; New Rochelle, New York
Feb 21, 1980*		No. 2 Louisville	W 77–60	24–4	Madison Square Garden; New York, New York
Feb 23, 1980*		at Fairfield	W 74–53	25–4	Alumni Hall; Fairfield, Connecticut
ECAC Metro tournament
Feb 28, 1980*		Fairleigh Dickinson; Quarterfinals	W 69–53	26–4	Nassau Coliseum; Uniondale, New York
Feb 29, 1980*		vs. Siena; Semifinals	W 76–70	27–4	Alumni Hall; Queens, New York
Mar 1, 1980*		vs. Saint Peter's; Championship game	W 64–46	28–4	Nassau Coliseum; Uniondale, New York
NCAA tournament
Mar 7, 1980*	(6 E) No. 19	vs. (11 E) Holy Cross; First round	W 84–78	29–4	Providence Civic Center; Providence, Rhode Island
Mar 9, 1980*	(6 E) No. 19	vs. (3 E) No. 11 Georgetown; Second Round	L 71–74	29–5	Providence Civic Center; Providence, Rhode Island
*Non-conference game. ^{#}Rankings from AP poll. (#) Tournament seedings in parentheses. E=East. All times are in Eastern Time.

== Awards and honors ==
- Jeff Ruland – All-American, Haggerty Award, Great Alaska Shootout Tournament MVP

== NBA draft ==
Round	Pick	Player	NBA club
2	25	Jeff Ruland	Golden State Warriors
