= 1979–80 Old Dominion Monarchs basketball team =

American college basketball season

1979–80 Old Dominion Monarchs basketball

ECAC South tournament champions

NCAA tournament, First Round
- Conference: ECAC South Conference
- Record: 25–5 ( ECAC South)
- Head coach: Paul Webb (5th season)
- Home arena: Norfolk Scope; Hampton Coliseum (alternate)

1979–80 ECAC South men's basketball standings
	Conf.				Overall
Team	W		L	PCT	W		L	PCT
Old Dominion †	-	–	-	–	25	–	5	.833
James Madison	-	–	-	–	18	–	8	.692
Navy	-	–	-	–	14	–	13	.519
Richmond	4	–	3	.571	13	–	14	.481
Baltimore	-	–	-	–	12	–	15	.444
William & Mary	-	–	-	–	12	–	15	.444
St. Francis (PA)	-	–	-	–	12	–	16	.429
Towson State	-	–	-	–	9	–	17	.346
Catholic	-	–	-	–	8	–	19	.296
Robert Morris	-	–	-	–	7	–	19	.269
George Mason	-	–	-	–	5	–	21	.192
† 1980 ECAC South tournament winner Rankings from AP Poll

The 1979–80 Old Dominion Monarchs basketball team represented Old Dominion University in the 1979–80 college basketball season. This was head coach Paul Webb's 5th season at Old Dominion. The Monarchs competed in the ECAC South Conference and played their home games at the ODU Fieldhouse. They finished the season 25–5. They won the ECAC South tournament to earn an automatic bid to the NCAA tournament. As No. 9 seed in the West Region where they were beaten by 8 seed and eventual National runner-up UCLA in the opening round.

== Roster ==
1979–80 Old Dominion Monarchs men's basketball team
Players
Coaches

Pos.	#	Name	Height	Weight	Year	Hometown
F		Ronnie Valentine	6 ft 7 in (2.01 m)	200 lb (91 kg)	Sr	Norfolk, Virginia
C	45	Mark West	6 ft 10 in (2.08 m)	220 lb (100 kg)	Fr	Petersburg, Virginia

Head coach

- Paul Webb

Assistant coach(es)

Legend

- (C) Team captain
- (S) Suspended
- (I) Ineligible
- (W) Walk-on
- Injured
- Current redshirt

== Schedule and results ==
Date time, TV	Rank^{#}	Opponent^{#}	Result	Record	Site (attendance) city, state
Exhibition
Nov 19, 1979*		Soviet Union	W 76–74 ^{OT}		Norfolk Scope; Norfolk, Virginia
Regular season
Dec 1, 1979*		Delaware State	W 102–83	1–0	Norfolk Scope; Norfolk, Virginia
Dec 5, 1979*		Virginia State	W 98–59	2–0	Norfolk Scope; Norfolk, Virginia
Dec 8, 1979*		UNC Wilmington	W 75–55	3–0	Norfolk Scope; Norfolk, Virginia
Dec 15, 1979*		Georgia Southern	W 97–62	4–0	Norfolk Scope; Norfolk, Virginia
Dec 18, 1979*		at East Carolina	W 70–65	5–0	Williams Arena at Minges Coliseum; Greenville, North Carolina
Dec 28, 1979*		vs. Richmond; Richmond Times Dispatch	W 90–84	6–0	Robins Center; Richmond, Virginia
Dec 29, 1979*		vs. No. 14 Virginia; Richmond Times Dispatch	L 58–79	6–1	Robins Center; Richmond, Virginia
Jan 4, 1980*		Vermont; Kiwanis ODU Classic	W 94–81	7–1	Norfolk Scope; Norfolk, Virginia
Jan 5, 1980*		Saint Joseph's; Kiwanis ODU Classic	L 51–52	7–2	Norfolk Scope; Norfolk, Virginia
Jan 8, 1980*		at Rhode Island	L 63–77	7–3	Keaney Gymnasium; Kingston, Rhode Island
Jan 10, 1980*		at Georgia Southern	W 67–58	8–3	Hanner Fieldhouse; Statesboro, Georgia
Jan 12, 1980*		Navy	W 58–44	9–3	Norfolk Scope; Norfolk, Virginia
Jan 16, 1980*		Norfolk State	W 60–57	10–3	Norfolk Scope; Norfolk, Virginia
Jan 19, 1980*		No. 3 Syracuse	W 68–67	11–3	Norfolk Scope; Norfolk, Virginia
Jan 22, 1980*		at VCU	W 68–64	12–3	Richmond Coliseum; Richmond, Virginia
Jan 24, 1980*		Duquesne	W 65–60	13–3	Norfolk Scope; Norfolk, Virginia
Jan 26, 1980*		William & Mary	W 60–51	14–3	Norfolk Scope; Norfolk, Virginia
Jan 29, 1980*		James Madison	W 52–44	15–3	Norfolk Scope; Norfolk, Virginia
Jan 31, 1980*		at Georgia State	W 71–64	16–3	GSU Sports Arena; Atlanta, Georgia
Feb 4, 1980*		at Stetson	W 66–64	17–3	Edmunds Center; DeLand, Florida
Feb 9, 1980*		at James Madison	W 83–63	18–3	Godwin Hall; Harrisonburg, Virginia
Feb 12, 1980*		George Mason	W 104–73	19–3	Norfolk Scope; Norfolk, Virginia
Feb 16, 1980*		at St. Bonaventure	L 72–84	19–4	Reilly Center; St. Bonaventure, New York
Feb 18, 1980*		VCU	W 76–75	20–4	Norfolk Scope; Norfolk, Virginia
Feb 20, 1980*		East Carolina	W 89–75	21–4	Norfolk Scope; Norfolk, Virginia
Feb 23, 1980*		at William & Mary	W 71–69 ^{OT}	22–4	William & Mary Hall; Williamsburg, Virginia
ECAC South tournament
Feb 28, 1980*		Catholic; Quarterfinals	W 112–59	23–4	Norfolk Scope; Norfolk, Virginia
Feb 29, 1980*		William & Mary; Semifinals	W 75–59	24–4	Hampton Coliseum; Norfolk, Virginia
Mar 1, 1980*		Navy; Championship game	W 62–51 ^{OT}	25–4	Hampton Coliseum; Norfolk, Virginia
NCAA tournament
Mar 7, 1980*	(9 W)	vs. (8 W) UCLA; First round	L 74–87	25–5	ASU Activity Center (9,250); Tempe, Arizona
*Non-conference game. ^{#}Rankings from AP poll. (#) Tournament seedings in parentheses. W=West. All times are in Eastern Time.
