= 1979–80 Illinois Fighting Illini men's basketball team =

American college basketball season

1979–80 Illinois Fighting Illini men's basketball

Illini Classic, Champion Rainbow Classic, Champion

National Invitation Tournament, Third Place
- Conference: Big Ten Conference

Ranking
- Coaches: No. Not ranked
- AP: No. Not ranked
- Record: 22–13 (8–10 Big Ten)
- Head coach: Lou Henson (5th season)
- Assistant coaches: Tony Yates (6th season); Dick Nagy (1st season); Larry Lubin (1st season)
- MVP: Eddie Johnson
- Captains: Levi Cobb; Neil Bresnahan
- Home arena: Assembly Hall

1979–80 Big Ten Conference men's basketball standings
	Conf.				Overall
Team	W		L	PCT	W		L	PCT
No. 7 Indiana	13	–	5	.722	21	–	8	.724
No. 10 Ohio State	12	–	6	.667	21	–	8	.724
No. 20 Purdue	11	–	7	.611	23	–	10	.697
Iowa	10	–	8	.556	23	–	10	.697
Minnesota	10	–	8	.556	21	–	11	.656
Illinois	8	–	10	.444	22	–	13	.629
Michigan	8	–	10	.444	17	–	13	.567
Wisconsin	7	–	11	.389	15	–	14	.517
Michigan State	6	–	12	.333	12	–	15	.444
Northwestern	5	–	13	.278	10	–	17	.370
Rankings from AP Poll

The 1979–80 Illinois Fighting Illini men's basketball team represented the University of Illinois.

== Regular season ==
For the 1979-80 season, head coach Lou Henson returned everyone from a team that finished with 19 wins. The team gave the head coach his first of 11, 20-win seasons at Illinois. That year, Illinois made its first postseason appearance since 1963, finishing third in the NIT. During the course of the season, the Illini would defeat eventual NCAA Tournament Champion, Louisville

=== Roster ===
1979–80 Illinois Fighting Illini men's basketball team
Players
Coaches

Pos.	#	Name	Height	Weight	Year	Previous school	Hometown
G	10	Reno Gray	6 ft 2 in (1.88 m)	170 lb (77 kg)	RS Sr	Hales Franciscan High School	Chicago, Illinois
G	12	Kevin Westervelt	6 ft 1 in (1.85 m)	165 lb (75 kg)	Sr	Richwoods High School	Peoria, Illinois
C	13	James Griffin	6 ft 10 in (2.08 m)	200 lb (91 kg)	So	Dunbar High School	Grandview, Texas
G	20	Kevin Bontemps	6 ft 1 in (1.85 m)	175 lb (79 kg)	Fr	Morton High School	Morton, Illinois
G	21	Quinn Richardson	5 ft 11 in (1.8 m)	175 lb (79 kg)	Fr	Eisenhower High School	Robbins, Illinois
G	22	Perry Range	6 ft 4 in (1.93 m)	180 lb (82 kg)	So	South Beloit High School	South Beloit, Illinois
G	30	Rob Judson	6 ft 2 in (1.88 m)	175 lb (79 kg)	Sr	Zion-Benton High School	Zion, Illinois
F	31	Neil Bresnahan (C)	6 ft 6 in (1.98 m)	200 lb (91 kg)	Sr	Fenwick High School	Oak Park, Illinois
F	32	Levi Cobb (C)	6 ft 6 in (1.98 m)	205 lb (93 kg)	Sr	Morgan Park High School	Chicago, Illinois
F	33	Eddie Johnson	6 ft 8 in (2.03 m)	210 lb (95 kg)	Jr	Westinghouse High School	Chicago, Illinois
F	42	Mark Smith	6 ft 7 in (2.01 m)	195 lb (88 kg)	Jr	Richwoods High School	Peoria, Illinois
F	43	Bryan Leonard	6 ft 10 in (2.08 m)	210 lb (95 kg)	So	Belleville High School-East	Belleville, Illinois
C	44	Derek Holcomb	6 ft 11 in (2.11 m)	230 lb (104 kg)	Jr	Richwoods High School	Peoria, Illinois

Head coach

- Lou Henson (New Mexico State University) (5th year)

Assistant coach(es)

- Tony Yates (University of Cincinnati) (6th year)
- Dick Nagy (Hardin-Simmons University) (1st year)
- Larry Lubin (University of Illinois) (1st year)

Legend

- (C) Team captain
- (S) Suspended
- (I) Ineligible
- (W) Walk-on
- Injured
- Current redshirt

Roster

== Schedule ==
Date time, TV	Rank^{#}	Opponent^{#}	Result	Record	Site (attendance) city, state
Non-Conference regular season
11/30/1979*		at No. 15 BYU	W 86-76	1-0	Marriott Center (23,042); Provo, UT
12/4/1979*		Missouri; Show-Me Classic	L 66-67 ^{OT}	1-1	Assembly Hall (14,004); Champaign, IL
12/6/1979*		Kent State	W 74-65	2-1	Assembly Hall (13,090); Champaign, IL
12/8/1979*		Long Beach State	W 77-60	3-1	Assembly Hall (14,075); Champaign, IL
12/10/1979*		at TCU	W 79-64	4-1	Daniel–Meyer Coliseum (4,110); Fort Worth, TX
12/11/1979*		Missouri-St. Louis	W 91-65	5-1	Assembly Hall (13,021); Champaign, IL
12/14/1979*		Kentucky State; Illini Classic	W 94-65	6-1	Assembly Hall (14,363); Champaign, IL
12/15/1979*		Illinois State; Illini Classic	W 47-40	7-1	Assembly Hall (16,257); Champaign, IL
12/22/1979*		Marquette	L 78-80	7-2	Assembly Hall (12,618); Champaign, IL
12/28/1979*		vs. Army; Rainbow Classic	W 75-48	8-2	Neal S. Blaisdell Center (-); Honolulu, HI
12/29/1979*		vs. No. 12 Louisville; Rainbow Classic	W 77-64	9-2	Neal S. Blaisdell Center (-); Honolulu, HI
12/30/1979*		at Hawaii; Rainbow Classic	W 94-82	10-2	Neal S. Blaisdell Center (-); Honolulu, HI
Big Ten regular season
1/3/1980	No. 20	No. 10 Iowa; Rivalry	L 71-72	10-3 (0-1)	Assembly Hall (10,839); Champaign, IL
1/5/1980	No. 20	Northwestern; Rivalry	W 81-71	11-3 (1-1)	Assembly Hall (9,174); Champaign, IL
1/10/1980		at No. 10 Purdue	L 66-74	11-4 (1-2)	Mackey Arena (12,982); West Lafayette, IN
1/12/1980		at Minnesota	L 75-79	11-5 (1-3)	Williams Arena (15,381); Minneapolis, MN
1/17/1980		Michigan	W 80-69	12-5 (2-3)	Assembly Hall (14,746); Champaign, IL
1/19/1980		at Wisconsin	W 69-64	13-5 (3-3)	Wisconsin Field House (10,386); Madison, WI
1/24/1980		No. 4 Ohio State	L 76-79	13-6 (3-4)	Assembly Hall (16,383); Champaign, IL
1/26/1980		Michigan State	W 74-65	14-6 (4-4)	Assembly Hall (16,490); Champaign, IL
1/31/1980		at No. 18 Indiana; Rivalry	L 54-60	14-7 (4-5)	Assembly Hall (16,723); Bloomington, IN
2/2/1980		at Michigan State	L 59-68	14-8 (4-6)	Jenison Fieldhouse (10,004); East Lansing, MI
2/7/1980		Wisconsin	W 67-50	15-8 (5-6)	Assembly Hall (13,873); Champaign, IL
2/9/1980		No. 20 Indiana; Rivalry	W 89-68	16-8 (6-6)	Assembly Hall (16,614); Champaign, IL
2/14/1980		at Michigan	L 76-78	16-9 (6-7)	Crisler Center (9,738); Ann Arbor, MI
2/16/1980		at No. 9 Ohio State	L 57-71	16-10 (6-8)	St. John Arena (13,591); Columbus, OH
2/21/1980		Minnesota	W 60-58 ^{OT}	17-10 (7-8)	Assembly Hall (14,592); Champaign, IL
2/23/1980		No. 15 Purdue	L 69-72	17-11 (7-9)	Assembly Hall (16,647); Champaign, IL
2/28/1980		at Northwestern; Rivalry	W 90-66	18-11 (8-9)	McGaw Memorial Hall (5,426); Evanston, IL
3/1/1980		at Iowa; Rivalry	L 71-75	18-12 (8-10)	Iowa Field House (13,365); Iowa City, IA
National Invitation Tournament
3/5/1980*		Loyola Chicago; NIT First round	W 105-87	19-12	Assembly Hall (13,326); Champaign, IL
3/10/1980*		Illinois State; NIT Second round	W 75-65	20-12	Assembly Hall (16,193); Champaign, IL
3/13/1980*		Murray State; NIT Quarterfinals	W 65-63	21-12	Assembly Hall (15,070); Champaign, IL
3/17/1980*		vs. Minnesota; NIT Semifinals	L 63-65	21-13	Madison Square Garden (11,223); New York, NY
3/19/1980*		vs. UNLV; NIT Third-place game	W 84-74	22-13	Madison Square Garden (-); New York, NY
*Non-conference game. ^{#}Rankings from AP Poll. (#) Tournament seedings in parentheses. All times are in Central Time.

== Player stats ==
Player	Games played	Minutes played	Field goals	Free throws	Rebounds	Assists	Blocks	Steals	Points
Eddie Johnson	35	1215	266	78	310	71	7	13	610
Mark Smith	35	1026	187	161	214	95	11	35	535
Reno Gray	35	858	131	57	47	109	2	39	319
James Griffin	35	676	119	36	154	25	39	18	274
Perry Range	35	809	90	63	85	64	2	36	243
Derek Holcomb	31	636	72	36	164	44	46	15	180
Neil Bresnahan	35	599	67	27	121	64	11	14	161
Rob Judson	31	595	59	32	44	47	0	15	150
Kevin Bontempts	30	363	15	26	28	67	1	16	56
Levi Cobb	25	140	20	7	36	14	2	9	47
Quinn Richardson	16	101	8	7	9	17	0	4	23
Kevin Westervelt	18	34	6	4	8	1	0	1	16

== Awards and honors ==
- Eddie Johnson
  - Fighting Illini All-Century team (2005)
  - Team Most Valuable Player

== Team players drafted into the NBA ==
Player	NBA club	Round	Pick
Neil Bresnahan	Golden State Warriors	6	117
