= 1979–80 Minnesota Golden Gophers men's basketball team =

American college basketball season

1979–80 Minnesota Golden Gophers men's basketball

National Invitation Tournament, Runner-Up
- Conference: Big Ten Conference
- Record: 21–11 (10–8 Big Ten)
- Head coach: Jim Dutcher
- Assistant coaches: Jimmy Williams; Jessie Evans; Marty Gillespie
- Home arena: Williams Arena

1979–80 Big Ten Conference men's basketball standings
	Conf.				Overall
Team	W		L	PCT	W		L	PCT
No. 7 Indiana	13	–	5	.722	21	–	8	.724
No. 10 Ohio State	12	–	6	.667	21	–	8	.724
No. 20 Purdue	11	–	7	.611	23	–	10	.697
Iowa	10	–	8	.556	23	–	10	.697
Minnesota	10	–	8	.556	21	–	11	.656
Illinois	8	–	10	.444	22	–	13	.629
Michigan	8	–	10	.444	17	–	13	.567
Wisconsin	7	–	11	.389	15	–	14	.517
Michigan State	6	–	12	.333	12	–	15	.444
Northwestern	5	–	13	.278	10	–	17	.370
Rankings from AP Poll

The 1979–80 Minnesota Golden Gophers men's basketball team represented the University of Minnesota as a member of the Big Ten Conference during the 1979–80 NCAA Division I men's basketball season. Led by head coach Jim Dutcher, the Gophers played their home games at Williams Arena in Minneapolis.

Minnesota finished tied for fourth in the rugged Big Ten Conference (Indiana and Ohio State were top 10 teams throughout the season while Iowa and Purdue reached the Final Four) with a record of 10–8, but were left out of the 48-team NCAA Tournament. The Gophers went on to reach the championship game of the 1980 NIT, where they fell to Virginia and college legend Ralph Sampson, and finished with an overall record of 21–11.

Senior forward Kevin McHale finished his career as the school-record holder in blocks while also establishing the single-season record (surpassed three seasons later by teammate Randy Breuer). He finished second on the career scoring and rebounding charts. McHale was taken by the Boston Celtics with the No. 3 pick in the 1980 NBA draft.

== Roster ==
1979–80 Minnesota Golden Gophers men's basketball team
Players
Coaches

Pos.	#	Name	Height	Weight	Year	Hometown
G	24	Mark Hall	6 ft 2 in (1.88 m)	—	So
G	32	Trent Tucker	6 ft 5 in (1.96 m)	185 lb (84 kg)	So	Flint, Michigan
F	42	Gary Holmes	6 ft 10 in (2.08 m)	—	So
F/C	44	Kevin McHale	6 ft 10 in (2.08 m)	210 lb (95 kg)	Sr	Hibbing, Minnesota
C	45	Randy Breuer	7 ft 3 in (2.21 m)	225 lb (102 kg)	Fr	Lake City, Minnesota
F	54	Ben Coleman	6 ft 9 in (2.06 m)	230 lb (104 kg)	Fr	Minneapolis, Minnesota

Head coach

- Jim Dutcher (Michigan)

Assistant coach(es)

Legend

- (C) Team captain
- (S) Suspended
- (I) Ineligible
- (W) Walk-on
- Injured
- Current redshirt

== Schedule and results ==
Date time, TV	Rank^{#}	Opponent^{#}	Result	Record	Site city, state
Non-conference regular season
Nov 30, 1979*		Eastern Michigan	W 77–56	1–0	Williams Arena; Minneapolis, Minnesota
Dec 3, 1979*		Fresno State	W 65–49	2–0	Williams Arena; Minneapolis, Minnesota
Dec 5, 1979*		North Dakota	W 87–60	3–0	Williams Arena; Minneapolis, Minnesota
Dec 15, 1979*		Nebraska	W 75–58	4–0	Williams Arena; Minneapolis, Minnesota
Dec 17, 1979*		at Tennessee	L 64–71	4–1	Stokely Athletic Center; Knoxville, Tennessee
Dec 20, 1979*		at Florida State	L 91–112	4–2	Tully Gymnasium; Tallahassee, Florida
Dec 22, 1979*		Kansas State	W 78–61	5–2	Williams Arena; Minneapolis, Minnesota
Dec 28, 1979*		Rutgers	W 98–59	6–2	Williams Arena; Minneapolis, Minnesota
Dec 29, 1979*		at Texas A&M	W 69–63	7–2	Williams Arena; Minneapolis, Minnesota
Big Ten Conference Regular Season
Jan 3, 1980		at Michigan	L 67–71	7–3 (0–1)	Crisler Arena; Ann Arbor, Michigan
Jan 5, 1980		at Michigan State	W 93–80	8–3 (1–1)	Jenison Field House; East Lansing, Michigan
Jan 10, 1980		Wisconsin	W 82–76 ^{OT}	9–3 (2–1)	Williams Arena; Minneapolis, Minnesota
Jan 12, 1980*		Illinois	W 79–75	10–3 (3–1)	Williams Arena; Minneapolis, Minnesota
Jan 17, 1980		at No. 2 Ohio State	L 70–75 ^{OT}	10–4 (3–2)	St. John Arena; Columbus, Ohio
Jan 19, 1980		No. 11 Purdue	W 67–61	11–4 (4–2)	Williams Arena; Minneapolis, Minnesota
Jan 24, 1980		No. 16 Indiana	W 55–47	12–4 (5–2)	Williams Arena; Minneapolis, Minnesota
Jan 26, 1980		at Iowa	L 73–80	12–5 (5–3)	Iowa Field House; Iowa City, Iowa
Jan 31, 1980		at Northwestern	W 74–64	13–5 (6–3)	Welsh-Ryan Arena; Evanston, Illinois
Feb 2, 1980		Iowa	L 63–73	13–6 (6–4)	Williams Arena; Minneapolis, Minnesota
Feb 7, 1980		at No. 12 Purdue	L 56–58	13–7 (6–5)	Mackey Arena; West Lafayette, Indiana
Feb 9, 1980		Northwestern	W 72–55	14–7 (7–5)	Williams Arena; Minneapolis, Minnesota
Feb 14, 1980		No. 9 Ohio State	W 74–70	15–7 (8–5)	Williams Arena; Minneapolis, Minnesota
Feb 16, 1980		at Indiana	L 54–67	15–8 (8–6)	Assembly Hall; Bloomington, Indiana
Feb 21, 1980		at Illinois	L 58–60 ^{OT}	15–9 (8–7)	Assembly Hall; Champaign, Illinois
Feb 23, 1980		at Wisconsin	L 55–70	15–10 (8–8)	Wisconsin Field House; Madison, Wisconsin
Feb 28, 1980		Michigan State	W 87–73	16–10 (9–8)	Williams Arena; Minneapolis, Minnesota
Mar 1, 1980		Michigan	W 68–67	17–10 (10–8)	Williams Arena; Minneapolis, Minnesota
National Invitation Tournament
Mar 5, 1980*		Bowling Green; First Round	W 64–50	18–10	Williams Arena; Minneapolis, Minnesota
Mar 10, 1980*		Mississippi; Second Round	W 58–56	19–10	Williams Arena; Minneapolis, Minnesota
Mar 13, 1980*		Southwestern Louisiana; Quarterfinal	W 94–73	20–10	Williams Arena; Minneapolis, Minnesota
Mar 17, 1980*		vs. Illinois; Semifinal	W 65–63	21–10	Madison Square Garden (11,223); New York, New York
Mar 19, 1980*		vs. Virginia; Championship game	L 55–58	21–11	Madison Square Garden (13,598); New York, New York
*Non-conference game. ^{#}Rankings from AP Poll. (#) Tournament seedings in parentheses.

== Team players in the 1980 NBA draft ==
Round	Pick	Player	NBA club
1	3	Kevin McHale	Boston Celtics
