= 1979–80 Wisconsin Badgers men's basketball team =

American college basketball season

1979–80 Wisconsin Badgers men's basketball
- Conference: Big Ten Conference
- Record: 15–14 (7–11 Big Ten)
- Head coach: Bill Cofield (4th season)
- Home arena: UW Fieldhouse

1979–80 Big Ten Conference men's basketball standings
	Conf.				Overall
Team	W		L	PCT	W		L	PCT
No. 7 Indiana	13	–	5	.722	21	–	8	.724
No. 10 Ohio State	12	–	6	.667	21	–	8	.724
No. 20 Purdue	11	–	7	.611	23	–	10	.697
Iowa	10	–	8	.556	23	–	10	.697
Minnesota	10	–	8	.556	21	–	11	.656
Illinois	8	–	10	.444	22	–	13	.629
Michigan	8	–	10	.444	17	–	13	.567
Wisconsin	7	–	11	.389	15	–	14	.517
Michigan State	6	–	12	.333	12	–	15	.444
Northwestern	5	–	13	.278	10	–	17	.370
Rankings from AP Poll

The 1979–80 Wisconsin Badgers men's basketball team represented the University of Wisconsin–Madison in the 1979–80 NCAA Division I men's basketball season. The head coach was Bill Cofield, coaching his fourth season with the Badgers. The team played their home games at the UW Fieldhouse in Madison, Wisconsin and was a member of the Big Ten Conference.

Guard Wes Matthews was the team's leading scorer with 549 points in 28 games. Other statistical leaders included forward Joe Chrnelich with 209 rebounds and Danny Hastings with 72 assists.

Late in the season, coach Cofield suspended Matthews for arguing with a coach, a decision that was believed to have cost the Badgers an invitation to play in the National Invitation Tournament. Cofield said of his decision: "The young man had to be taught a lesson. While we may have had a shot at postseason play, the basketball program at Wisconsin is more important than whether we win or lose a game."

== Roster ==
1979–80 Wisconsin Badgers men's basketball team
Players
Coaches

Pos.	#	Name	Height	Weight	Year	Hometown
F	50	Joe Chrnelich	6 ft 7 in (2.01 m)	210 lb (95 kg)	Sr	Milwaukee, Wisconsin
G	10	Arnold Gaines	6 ft 4 in (1.93 m)	195 lb (88 kg)	Sr	Baltimore, Maryland
F	35	Claude Gregory	6 ft 8 in (2.03 m)	210 lb (95 kg)	Jr	Washington, D. C.
G	21	Dan Hastings	6 ft 4 in (1.93 m)	185 lb (84 kg)	Jr	Drexel Hill, PA
G	14	Steve Jacobson	6 ft 1 in (1.85 m)	185 lb (84 kg)	So	Pardeeville, Wisconsin
G	32	Robert Jenkins	6 ft 3 in (1.91 m)	187 lb (85 kg)	Sr	Milwaukee, Wisconsin
F	30	Mike Kreklow	6 ft 6 in (1.98 m)	190 lb (86 kg)	Fr	Neenah, Wisconsin
G	11	Wes Matthews	6 ft 1 in (1.85 m)	165 lb (75 kg)	Jr	Bridgeport, Connecticut
C	44	Mark Newberg	6 ft 11 in (2.11 m)	225 lb (102 kg)	Sr	La Crosse, Wisconsin

Head coach

- Bill Cofield

Assistant coach(es)

- Bo Ryan

Legend

- (C) Team captain
- (S) Suspended
- (I) Ineligible
- (W) Walk-on
- Injured
- Current redshirt

== Schedule ==
Date time, TV	Rank^{#}	Opponent^{#}	Result	Record	Site city, state
November 30*		Oklahoma City	W 99–92	1–0	Wisconsin Field House; Madison, WI
December 1*		East Tennessee State	W 68–56	2–0	Wisconsin Field House; Madison, WI
December 5* ESPN		at DePaul	L 77–90	2–1	Alumni Hall; Chicago, IL
December 8*		Alabama	L 62–66	2–2	Wisconsin Field House; Madison, WI
December 12*		Eastern Michigan	W 69–57	3–2	Wisconsin Field House; Madison, WI
December 15*		at Marquette	W 57–56	4–2	MECCA Arena; Milwaukee, WI
December 22*		Cleveland State	W 103–78	5–2	Wisconsin Field House; Madison, WI
December 23*		Morgan State	W 94–42	6–2	Wisconsin Field House; Madison, WI
December 27*		vs. Nebraska	L 82–83	6–3	Neal S. Blaisdell Center; Honolulu, Hawaii
December 28*		vs. Nevada	W 86–61	7–3	Neal S. Blaisdell Center; Honolulu, Hawaii
December 28*		vs. Army	W 78–54	8–3	Neal S. Blaisdell Center; Honolulu, Hawaii
January 3		Northwestern	W 75–66	9–3 (1–0)	Wisconsin Field House; Madison, WI
January 5		Indiana	W 52–50	10–3 (2–0)	Wisconsin Field House; Madison, WI
January 10		at Minnesota	L 76–82	10–4 (2–1)	Williams Arena; Minneapolis, MN
January 12		at Iowa	L 65–66	10–5 (2–2)	Iowa Field House; Iowa City, Iowa
January 15		at Michigan State	L 61–62	10–6 (2–3)	Jenison Field House; East Lansing, MI
January 19		Illinois	L 64–69	10–7 (2–4)	Wisconsin Field House; Madison, WI
January 24		Purdue	L 60–73	10–8 (2–5)	Wisconsin Field House; Madison, WI
January 26		No. 4 Ohio State	W 72–71	11–8 (3–5)	St. John Arena; Columbus, OH
January 31		Michigan	L 69–73	11–9 (3–6)	Wisconsin Field House; Madison, WI
February 2		Ohio State	W 70–67	12–9 (4–6)	Wisconsin Field House; Madison, WI
February 7		at Illinois	L 50–67	12–10 (4–7)	Assembly Hall; Champaign, IL
February 9		at Michigan	L 59–68	12–11 (4–8)	Crisler Arena; Ann Arbor, MI
February 14		Michigan State	W 80–66	13–11 (5–8)	Wisconsin Field House; Madison, WI
February 16		at Purdue	L 61–69	13–12 (5–9)	Mackey Arena; West Lafayette, Indiana
February 21		Iowa	W 62–58	14–12 (6–9)	Wisconsin Field House; Madison, WI
February 23		Minnesota	W 70–55	15–12 (7–9)	Wisconsin Field House; Madison, WI
February 28		at Indiana	L 52–61	15–13 (7–10)	Assembly Hall; Bloomington, Indiana
March 1		at Northwestern	L 50–53	15–14 (7–11)	Welsh-Ryan Arena; Evanston, IL
*Non-conference game. ^{#}Rankings from AP Poll. (#) Tournament seedings in parentheses.

== Team players drafted into the NBA ==
Round	Pick	Player	NBA club
1	14	Wes Matthews	Washington Bullets
4	82	Joe Chrnelich	New York Knicks
