= 1979–80 Michigan State Spartans men's basketball team =

American college basketball season

1979–80 Michigan State Spartans men's basketball
- Conference: Big Ten Conference
- Record: 12–15 (6–12 Big Ten)
- Head coach: Jud Heathcote (4th season)
- Assistant coaches: William Berry; Dave Harshman; Edgar Wilson; Fred Paulsen
- Captains: Ronald Charles; Terry Donnelly
- Home arena: Jenison Field House

1979–80 Big Ten Conference men's basketball standings
	Conf.				Overall
Team	W		L	PCT	W		L	PCT
No. 7 Indiana	13	–	5	.722	21	–	8	.724
No. 10 Ohio State	12	–	6	.667	21	–	8	.724
No. 20 Purdue	11	–	7	.611	23	–	10	.697
Iowa	10	–	8	.556	23	–	10	.697
Minnesota	10	–	8	.556	21	–	11	.656
Illinois	8	–	10	.444	22	–	13	.629
Michigan	8	–	10	.444	17	–	13	.567
Wisconsin	7	–	11	.389	15	–	14	.517
Michigan State	6	–	12	.333	12	–	15	.444
Northwestern	5	–	13	.278	10	–	17	.370
Rankings from AP Poll

The 1979–80 Michigan State Spartans men's basketball team represented Michigan State University in the 1980–81 NCAA Division I men's basketball season. The team played their home games at Jenison Field House in East Lansing, Michigan and were members of the Big Ten Conference. They were coached by Jud Heathcote in his fourth year at Michigan State. The Spartans finished the season 12–15, 6–12 in Big Ten play to finish in ninth place in conference.

== Previous season ==
The Spartans finished the 1978–79 season 26–6, 13–5 in Big Ten play to win the Big Ten and ranked No. 3 in the country. The Spartans received a No. 2 seed in the Mideast of the NCAA Tournament. MSU defeated Lamar, Louisiana State, and Notre Dame to advance to the Final Four. In the Final Four, they defeated Penn by 34 points to face overall No. 1 Indiana State. The Spartans won the National Championship as Magic Johnson led MSU over Larry Bird and the Sycamores.

== Roster and statistics ==
1979–80 Michigan State Spartans men's basketball team
No	Name	Pos	Year	Height	Pts	Reb
5	Kevin Smith	G	SO	6–1	8.4	1.8
11	Terry Donnelly	G	SR	6–2	8.8	1.4
12	Mike Brkovich	G	JR	6–4	8.8	2.7
15	Ron Charles	F	SR	6–8	14.5	8.9
21	Don Brkovich	F	SO	6–6	1.0	
22	Bill Cawood	G	FR	6–6	0.5	
23	Mike Longaker	G	SR	6–2	1.2	0.2
30	Kurt James	F	JR	6–7	1.5	2.6
31	Jay Vincent	C	JR	6–8	21.5	7.7
35	Rob Gonzalez	F	SO	6–7	2.3	1.1
41	Derek Perry	F	FR	6–6	2.4	1.2
42	Richard Kaye	F	JR	6–6	1.0	
44	Herb Bostic	F	FR	6–4	1.1	0.6
52	Steve Bates	C	SO	6–10	0.7	0.8

== Schedule and results ==
Date time, TV	Rank^{#}	Opponent^{#}	Result	Record	Site city, state
Non-conference regular season
Nov 30, 1979*		vs. Princeton; Lapchick Memorial Tournament semifinal	W 60–46	1–0	Carnesecca Arena; Jamaica, NY
Dec 1, 1979*		at No. 16 St. John's; Lapchick Memorial Tournament championship	L 73–88	1–1	Carnesecca Arena; Jamaica, NY
Dec 6, 1979*		Long Beach State	W 87–73	2–1	Jenison Field House; East Lansing, MI
Dec 10, 1979*		Portland State	W 88–54	3–1	Jenison Field House; East Lansing, MI
Dec 14, 1979*		at Wichita State	L 54–55	3–2	Levitt Arena; Wichita, KS
Dec 18, 1979*		at Central Michigan	W 95–76	4–2	Rose Arena; Mount Pleasant, MI
Dec 20, 1979*		at Detroit Mercy	W 63–57	5–2	Calihan Hall; Detroit, MI
Dec 28, 1979*		vs. Weber State; Las Vegas Holiday Classic semifinal	L 61–63	5–3	Las Vegas Convention Center; Las Vegas, NV
Dec 29, 1979*		vs. Loyola Marymount; Las Vegas Holiday Classic third place game	W 82–65	6–3	Las Vegas Convention Center; Las Vegas, NV
Big Ten regular season
Jan 3, 1980		No. 8 Purdue	W 73–71	6–4 (0–1)	Jenison Field House; East Lansing, MI
Jan 5, 1980		Minnesota	L 80–93	6–5 (0–2)	Jenison Field House; East Lansing, MI
Jan 10, 1980		at Northwestern	L 61–65	6–6 (0–3)	Welsh-Ryan Arena; Evanston, IL
Jan 12, 1980		at No. 19 Indiana	L 64–72	6–7 (0–4)	Assembly Hall; Bloomington, IN
Jan 17, 1980		Wisconsin	W 62–61	7–7 (1–4)	Jenison Field House; East Lansing, MI
Jan 19, 1980		No. 13 Iowa	W 75–67	8–7 (2–4)	Jenison Field House; East Lansing, MI
Jan 24, 1980		at Michigan; Rivalry	W 59–58	9–7 (3–4)	Crisler Arena; Ann Arbor, MI
Jan 26, 1980		at Illinois	L 65–74	9–8 (3–5)	Assembly Hall; Champaign, IL
Jan 31, 1980		No. 6 Ohio State	W 74–54	10–8 (4–5)	Jenison Field House; East Lansing, MI
Feb 2, 1980		Illinois	W 68–59	11–8 (5–5)	Jenison Field House; East Lansing, MI
Feb 7, 1980		at Iowa	L 39–44	11–9 (5–6)	Iowa Field House; Iowa City, IA
Feb 9, 1980		at No. 13 Ohio State	L 59–71	11–10 (5–7)	St. John Arena; Columbus, OH
Feb 14, 1980		at Wisconsin	L 66–80	11–11 (5–8)	Wisconsin Field House; Madison, WI
Feb 16, 1980		Michigan; Rivalry	W 82–74	12–11 (6–8)	Jenison Field House; East Lansing, MI
Feb 21, 1980		No. 19 Indiana	L 72–75	12–12 (6–9)	Jenison Field House; East Lansing, MI
Feb 23, 1980		Northwestern	L 73–75	12–13 (6–10)	Jenison Field House; East Lansing, MI
Feb 28, 1980		at Minnesota	L 73–87	12–14 (6–11)	Williams Arena; Minneapolis, MN
Mar 1, 1980		at No. 18 Purdue	L 73–91	12–15 (6–12)	Mackey Arena; West Lafayette, IN
*Non-conference game. ^{#}Rankings from AP Poll,. (#) Tournament seedings in parentheses. Source

== Awards and honors ==
- Jay Vincent – All-Big Ten First Team
- Jay Vincent – Big Ten Scoring Champion (22.1 ppg in-conference)

== See also ==
- 1980 in Michigan
