= 1979–80 Iowa Hawkeyes men's basketball team =

American college basketball season

1979–80 Iowa Hawkeyes men's basketball

NCAA tournament, Final Four
- Conference: Big Ten Conference
- Record: 23–10 (10–8 Big Ten)
- Head coach: Lute Olson (6th season)
- Assistant coaches: Jim Rosborough (6th season); Tony McAndrews (3rd season); Ken Burmeister (1st season)
- MVP: Ronnie Lester
- Home arena: Iowa Field House

1979–80 Big Ten Conference men's basketball standings
	Conf.				Overall
Team	W		L	PCT	W		L	PCT
No. 7 Indiana	13	–	5	.722	21	–	8	.724
No. 10 Ohio State	12	–	6	.667	21	–	8	.724
No. 20 Purdue	11	–	7	.611	23	–	10	.697
Iowa	10	–	8	.556	23	–	10	.697
Minnesota	10	–	8	.556	21	–	11	.656
Illinois	8	–	10	.444	22	–	13	.629
Michigan	8	–	10	.444	17	–	13	.567
Wisconsin	7	–	11	.389	15	–	14	.517
Michigan State	6	–	12	.333	12	–	15	.444
Northwestern	5	–	13	.278	10	–	17	.370
Rankings from AP Poll

The 1979–80 Iowa Hawkeyes men's basketball team represented the University of Iowa as a member of the Big Ten Conference during the 1979–80 college basketball season. The team was led by head coach Lute Olson and played their home games at the Iowa Field House. They finished with a 23–10 (10–8 Big Ten) record, and reached the Final Four of the NCAA tournament as champions of the East Region. To date, this is Iowa's most recent appearance in the NCAA Final Four in men's basketball.

== Roster ==
1979–80 Iowa Hawkeyes men's basketball team
Players
Coaches

Pos.	#	Name	Height	Weight	Year	Hometown
G	23	Mike Arens	6 ft 4 in (1.93 m)	180 lb (82 kg)	Sr	Chicago, Illinois
G	30	Kenny Arnold	6 ft 2 in (1.88 m)	185 lb (84 kg)	So	Chicago, Illinois
G	14	Greg Boyle	6 ft 2 in (1.88 m)	180 lb (82 kg)	Fr	Mundelein, Illinois
F	40	Kevin Boyle	6 ft 6 in (1.98 m)	195 lb (88 kg)	So	Chicago, Illinois
G	32	Vince Brookins	6 ft 5 in (1.96 m)	205 lb (93 kg)	Jr	Cleveland, Ohio
F	20	Jon Darsee	6 ft 5 in (1.96 m)	195 lb (88 kg)	So	West Des Moines, Iowa
F	44	Mark Gannon	6 ft 6 in (1.98 m)	215 lb (98 kg)	Fr	Iowa City, Iowa
G	10	Tom Grogan	6 ft 3 in (1.91 m)	179 lb (81 kg)	Fr	Kansas City, Kansas
G	24	Bob Hansen	6 ft 5 in (1.96 m)	190 lb (86 kg)	Fr	Des Moines, Iowa
F	50	Mike Heller	6 ft 8 in (2.03 m)	215 lb (98 kg)	Fr	St. Paul, Minnesota
F	42	Mike Henry	6 ft 9 in (2.06 m)	205 lb (93 kg)	Jr	Elgin, Illinois
C	54	Steve Krafcisin	6 ft 10 in (2.08 m)	230 lb (104 kg)	Jr	Chicago, Illinois
G	12	Ronnie Lester	6 ft 2 in (1.88 m)	175 lb (79 kg)	Sr	Chicago, Illinois
C	52	Steve Waite	6 ft 10 in (2.08 m)	225 lb (102 kg)	Jr	Iowa City, Iowa

Head coach

Lute Olson

Assistant coach(es)

- Jim Rosborough
- Tony McAndrews
- Ken Burmeister

Legend

- (C) Team captain
- (S) Suspended
- (I) Ineligible
- (W) Walk-on
- Injured
- Current redshirt

Roster

== Schedule and results ==
Date time, TV	Rank^{#}	Opponent^{#}	Result	Record	High points	High rebounds	High assists	Site (attendance) city, state
Regular season
December 1, 1979*		Northern Illinois	W 86–43	1–0	15 – Krafcisin	8 – Krafcisin	4 – Tied	Iowa Field House (13,365); Iowa City, IA
December 3, 1979*		Colorado State	W 113–66	2–0	19 – Krafcisin	9 – Krafcisin	9 – Arnold	Iowa Field House (13,365); Iowa City, IA
December 6, 1979*	No. 20	Northern Iowa	W 78–46	3–0	21 – Lester	8 – Boyle	7 – Hansen	Iowa Field House (13,365); Iowa City, IA
December 8, 1979*	No. 20	at Detroit	W 80–54	4–0	26 – Lester	15 – Waite	3 – Tied	Calihan Hall (6,123); Detroit, MI
December 11, 1979*	No. 17	at Wichita State	W 81–62	5–0	23 – Lester	9 – Arnold	3 – Tied	Charles Koch Arena (10,535); Wichita, KS
December 15, 1979*	No. 17	at Iowa State; Iowa Corn Cy-Hawk Series	W 67–64	6–0	23 – Lester	9 – Waite	5 – Lester	Hilton Coliseum (14,000); Ames, IA
December 21, 1979*	No. 13	vs. Mississippi State; UD Invitational Tournament Semifinals	W 81–62	7–0	18 – Arnold	11 – Waite	8 – Arnold	University of Dayton Arena; Dayton, OH
December 22, 1979*	No. 13	at Dayton; UD Invitational Tournament Finals	W 61–54	8–0	17 – Arnold	8 – Krafcisin	4 – Arnold	University of Dayton Arena (10,612); Dayton, OH
December 29, 1979*	No. 11	Drake	W 77–66	9–0	20 – Brookins	14 – Brookins	6 – Boyle	Iowa Field House (13,365); Iowa City, IA
January 3, 1980	No. 10	at No. 20 Illinois	W 72–71	10–0 (1–0)	21 – Boyle	7 – Tied	4 – Boyle	Assembly Hall (10,839); Champaign, IL
January 5, 1980	No. 10	at Michigan	L 65–68	10–1 (1–1)	25 – Brookins	6 – Krafcisin	3 – Tied	Crisler Arena (11,047); Ann Arbor, MI
January 10, 1980	No. 12	No. 3 Ohio State	L 71–77	10–2 (1–2)	14 – Tied	12 – Tied	6 – Boyle	Iowa Field House (13,365); Iowa City, IA
January 12, 1980	No. 12	Wisconsin	W 66–65	11–2 (2–2)	15 – Krafcisin	9 – Krafcisin	4 – Tied	Iowa Field House (13,365); Iowa City, IA
January 17, 1980	No. 13	at No. 19 Indiana	L 69–81	11–3 (2–3)	16 – Krafcisin	10 – Krafcisin	5 – Tied	Assembly Hall (17,136); Bloomington, IN
January 19, 1980	No. 13	at Michigan State	L 67–75	11–4 (2–4)	16 – Tied	10 – Krafcisin	6 – Arnold	Jenison Fieldhouse (10,004); East Lansing, MI
January 24, 1980		Northwestern	W 86–64	12–4 (3–4)	24 – Boyle	10 – Krafcisin	7 – Arnold	Iowa Field House (13,365); Iowa City, IA
January 26, 1980		Minnesota	W 80–73	13–4 (4–4)	27 – Arnold	10 – Waite	7 – Boyle	Iowa Field House (13,365); Iowa City, IA
January 31, 1980		at No. 17 Purdue	L 56–70	13–5 (4–5)	17 – Krafcisin	10 – Krafcisin	3 – Hansen	Mackey Arena (14,123); West Lafayette, IN
February 2, 1980		at Minnesota	W 73–63	14–5 (5–5)	19 – Arnold	9 – Krafcisin	4 – Arnold	Williams Arena (17,506); Minneapolis, MN
February 7, 1980		Michigan State	W 44–39 ^{OT}	15–5 (6–5)	20 – Krafcisin	6 – Waite	6 – Arnold	Iowa Field House (13,365); Iowa City, IA
February 9, 1980		No. 12 Purdue	W 74–59	16–5 (7–5)	20 – Arnold	12 – Boyle	6 – Arnold	Iowa Field House (13,366); Iowa City, IA
February 14, 1980	No. 20	Indiana	L 55–66	16–6 (7–6)	13 – Hansen	8 – Tied	7 – Arnold	Iowa Field House (13,366); Iowa City, IA
February 16, 1980	No. 20	at Northwestern	W 60–58	17–6 (8–6)	15 – Boyle	8 – Krafcisin	4 – Arnold	Welsh–Ryan Arena (6,679); Evanston, IL
February 21, 1980	No. 12	at Wisconsin	L 58–62	17–7 (8–7)	23 – Krafcisin	5 – Krafcisin	5 – Boyle	Wisconsin Field House (13,365); Madison, WI
February 23, 1980		at No. 11 Ohio State	L 69–70	17–8 (8–8)	20 – Krafcisin	11 – Waite	6 – Hansen	St. John Arena (13,591); Columbus, OH
February 28, 1980		Michigan	W 83–67	18–8 (9–8)	23 – Krafcisin	9 – Krafcisin	8 – Arnold	Iowa Field House (13,365); Iowa City, IA
March 1, 1980		Illinois	W 75–71	19–8 (10–8)	15 – Lester	11 – Boyle	5 – Tied	Iowa Field House (13,365); Iowa City, IA
NCAA Tournament
March 6, 1980*	(5 E)	vs. (12 E) Virginia Commonwealth; First round	W 86–72	20–8	23 – Arnold	10 – Waite	8 – Lester	Greensboro Memorial Coliseum (6,865); Greensboro, NC
March 8, 1980*	(5 E)	vs. (4 E) No. 19 North Carolina State; Second Round	W 77–64	21–8	18 – Arnold	7 – Boyle	4 – Lester	Greensboro Memorial Coliseum (13,210); Greensboro, NC
March 14, 1980*	(5 E)	vs. (1 E) No. 3 Syracuse; East Regional semifinal – Sweet Sixteen	W 88–77	22–8	21 – Brookins	5 – Tied	7 – Lester	The Spectrum (17,569); Philadelphia, PA
March 16, 1980*	(5 E)	vs. (3 E) No. 20 Georgetown; East Regional Final – Elite Eight	W 81–80	23–8	22 – Brookins	4 – Tied	9 – Lester	The Spectrum (15,981); Philadelphia, PA
March 22, 1980*	(5 E)	vs. (2 MW) No. 4 Louisville; National semifinal – Final Four	L 72–80	23–9	20 – Arnold	7 – Boyle	5 – Tied	Market Square Arena (16,637); Indianapolis, IN
March 24, 1980*	(5 E)	vs. (6 ME) No. 18 Purdue; Third Place game	L 58–75	23–10	19 – Arnold	7 – Tied	3 – Tied	Market Square Arena (16,637); Indianapolis, IN
*Non-conference game. ^{#}Rankings from AP Poll. (#) Tournament seedings in parentheses. E=East, MW=Midwest, ME-Mideast. All times are in Central Time.

== Team players in the 1980 NBA draft ==
Round	Pick	Player	NBA club
1	10	Ronnie Lester	Portland Trail Blazers
