= 1980 NCAA Division I basketball championship game =

1980 NCAA Tournament Championship Game
National championship game
| UCLA Bruins | Louisville Cardinals |
| Pac-10 | Metro |
| (22–9) | (32–3) |
|---|---|
| 54 | 59 |
| Head coach: Larry Brown | Head coach: Denny Crum |
- AP: NR
- Coaches: NR
- AP: 2
- Coaches: 4
| | 1st half | 2nd half | Total |
|---|---|---|---|
| UCLA Bruins | 28 | 26 | 54 |
| Louisville Cardinals | 26 | 33 | 59 |
- Date: March 24, 1980
- Venue: Market Square Arena, Indianapolis, Indiana
- MVP: Darrell Griffith, Louisville
- Favorite: Louisville

United States TV coverage
- Network: NBC
- Announcers: Dick Enberg (play-by-play); Billy Packer and Al McGuire (color)

The 1980 NCAA Division I Basketball Championship Game was the finals of the 1980 NCAA Division I Basketball Tournament and it determined the national champion for the 1979-80 NCAA Division I men's basketball season. The game was played on March 24, 1980, at Market Square Arena in Indianapolis, and featured the Midwest Regional Champion, #2-seeded Louisville and the West Regional Champion, #8-seeded UCLA.

The Cardinals narrowly defeated the Bruins to win their first national championship in program history.

== Participating teams ==
=== UCLA Bruins ===
- West
  - UCLA (8) 87, Old Dominion (9) 74
  - UCLA 77, DePaul (1) 71
  - UCLA 72, Ohio State (4) 68
  - UCLA 85, Clemson (6) 74
- Final Four
  - UCLA 67, Purdue (6) 62

=== Louisville Cardinals ===
- Midwest
  - Louisville (2) 71, Kansas State (7) 69 (OT)
  - Louisville 66, Texas A&M (6) 55 (OT)
  - Louisville 86, LSU (1) 66
- Final Four
  - Louisville 80, Iowa (5) 72

== Starting lineups ==
| UCLA | Position | Louisville |
|---|---|---|
| Michael Holton | G | Jerry Eaves |
| Rod Foster | G | † Darrell Griffith |
| James Wilkes | F | Derek Smith |
| Kiki Vandeweghe | F | Wiley Brown |
| Mike Sanders | C | Rodney McCray |
† 1980 Consensus First Team All-American

== Game summary ==
NBC

March 24

Box Score

#W8 ~~UCLA Bruins~~ 54, #MW2 Louisville Cardinals 59
Scoring by half: 28–26, 26–33
| Pts: Rod Foster 16; Rebs: Kiki Vandeweghe 7 Asts: Rod Foster 5 | Pts: Darrell Griffith 23; Rebs: Rodney McCray 11; Asts: 3 tied with 3 |

Market Square Arena - Indianapolis, Indiana

== Aftermath ==
UCLA would later be forced to vacate their appearance in the championship game and the 1980 NCAA tournament after players representing the school were declared ineligible by the NCAA. The Bruins would not return to the championship game until 1995, where they defeated Arkansas to win their most recent national championship.

Louisville would return to the national championship game six years later, where they upset Duke to win another title. They would also return to the title game in 2013, where they defeated Michigan to win what was their third title. However, Louisville was forced to vacate their third title due to a massive sex scandal involving players on the team, and as a result the Cardinals had four seasons worth of wins wiped from the record books.
