= Arnette Hallman =

American basketball player

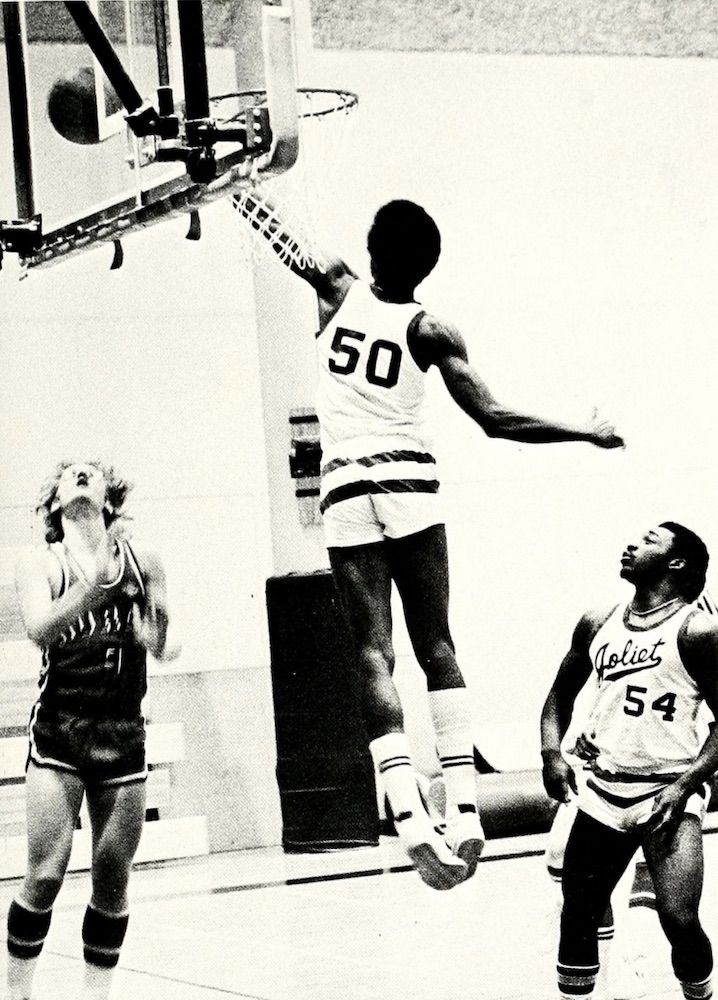
- Hallman blocks a shot with the Joliet JC Wolves in 1977

Personal information
- Born: October 19, 1958 (age 68) Chicago, Illinois, U.S.
- Listed height: 6 ft 7 in (2.01 m)
- Listed weight: 205 lb (93 kg)

Career information
- High school: Carl Schurz (Chicago, Illinois)
- College: Joliet JC (1976–1978); Purdue (1978–1980)
- NBA draft: 1980: 2nd round, 46th overall pick
- Drafted by: Boston Celtics
- Playing career: 1980–1990
- Position: Small forward

Career history
- 1980–1981: Maine Lumberjacks
- 1983–1984: BC Giants Osnabrück
- 1985–1986: Barreirense
- 1986–1988: Sporting CP
- 1988–1989: FC Porto
- 1989–1990: Belenenses
- Stats at Basketball Reference

Arnette Lamar Hallman (born October 19, 1958) is an American former professional basketball player. He played college basketball for the Joliet JC Wolves and Purdue Boilermakers. Hallman was selected in the second round of the 1980 NBA draft by the Boston Celtics and spent the majority of his professional career in Europe.

== College career ==
Hallman began his collegiate career at Joliet Junior College before transferring to play for the Purdue Boilermakers, where he was a starter for his two seasons there. While playing for the Boilermakers, Hallman was renowned for his jumping ability and rebounding skills. He made 67 appearances for Purdue with 65 starts, averaging 8.4 points and 5.4 rebounds a contest. He made headlines when scoring the game winner against Magic Johnson's Michigan State Spartans in January 1979. In 1980, Hallman advanced to the Final four of the NCAA Division I basketball tournament.

== Professional career ==
Hallman was selected by the Boston Celtics in the second round of the 1980 NBA draft. He attended training camp but was cut before the start of the season. The Celtics assigned him to their affiliate team in the Continental Basketball Association (CBA), the Maine Lumberjacks. Midway through the 1980–81 season, he suffered a broken foot and then slipped a vertebra in his back which ruled him out for the rest of the season. In January 1981, he returned to the Boilermakers to serve as a volunteer assistant coach while he recovered from his injuries.

In 1983–84, he played for the BC Giants Osnabrück in the German Basketball Bundesliga and in the FIBA Korać Cup. He spent five seasons playing for four teams in Portugal.

== Career statistics ==
Legend
GP	Games played	GS	Games started	MPG	Minutes per game
FG%	Field goal percentage	3P%	3-point field goal percentage	FT%	Free throw percentage
RPG	Rebounds per game	APG	Assists per game	SPG	Steals per game
BPG	Blocks per game	PPG	Points per game	**Bold**	Career high

=== College ===
Year	Team	GP	GS	MPG	FG%	3P%	FT%	RPG	APG	SPG	BPG	PPG
1978–79	Purdue	**35**	**33**	27.8	**.496**	–	**.600**	4.9	.9	**.3**	**.8**	8.1
1979–80	Purdue	32	32	**30.8**	.438	–	.508	**5.9**	**1.2**	**.3**	.7	**8.8**
Career		67	65	29.2	.464	–	.561	5.4	1.0	.3	.7	8.4

== Personal life ==
Hallman has lived in Germany since his retirement from playing. He works as an investment banker and in customer service at Frankfurt Airport. Hallman speaks six languages.

Hallman has three sons. His oldest son, Arnette Hallman, is a Portuguese-Spanish professional basketball player who has played in Portugal, Spain and France.
