= 1979–80 Ohio State Buckeyes men's basketball team =

American college basketball season

1979–80 Ohio State Buckeyes men's basketball
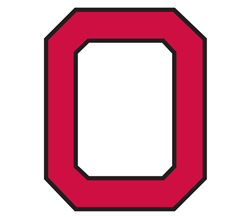

NCAA tournament, Sweet Sixteen
- Conference: Big Ten Conference

Ranking
- Coaches: No. 9
- AP: No. 10
- Record: 21–8 (12–6 Big Ten)
- Head coach: Eldon Miller (4th season)
- Home arena: St. John Arena

1979–80 Big Ten Conference men's basketball standings
| | Conf. | | | | Overall |
| Team | W | | L | PCT | W | | L | PCT |
|---|---|---|---|---|---|---|---|---|
| No. 7 Indiana | 13 | – | 5 | .722 | 21 | – | 8 | .724 |
| No. 10 Ohio State | 12 | – | 6 | .667 | 21 | – | 8 | .724 |
| No. 20 Purdue | 11 | – | 7 | .611 | 23 | – | 10 | .697 |
| Iowa | 10 | – | 8 | .556 | 23 | – | 10 | .697 |
| Minnesota | 10 | – | 8 | .556 | 21 | – | 11 | .656 |
| Illinois | 8 | – | 10 | .444 | 22 | – | 13 | .629 |
| Michigan | 8 | – | 10 | .444 | 17 | – | 13 | .567 |
| Wisconsin | 7 | – | 11 | .389 | 15 | – | 14 | .517 |
| Michigan State | 6 | – | 12 | .333 | 12 | – | 15 | .444 |
| Northwestern | 5 | – | 13 | .278 | 10 | – | 17 | .370 |
Rankings from AP Poll

The 1979–80 Ohio State Buckeyes men's basketball team represented Ohio State University as a member of the Big Ten Conference during the 1979–80 NCAA Division I men's basketball season. Led by 4th-year head coach Eldon Miller, the Buckeyes played their home games at St. John Arena in Columbus, Ohio.

With a loaded roster that had five future NBA players, Ohio State spent all but one week of the season ranked in the AP top ten. The Buckeyes went into the regular season finale tied with Indiana in the conference standings, but fell to the Hoosiers on the road in overtime. Likely under-seeded, the team received a bid to the NCAA tournament as No. 4 seed in the West region. After handling No. 5 seed Arizona State in the round of 32, the Buckeyes were upset in the Sweet Sixteen by No. 8 seed and eventual Final Four participant UCLA, 72–68.

Ohio State finished with a record of 21–8 (12–6 Big Ten). Senior guard Kelvin Ransey was named a Consensus second-team All-American and was selected as the No. 4 pick in the 1980 NBA draft.

== Roster ==
1979–80 Ohio State Buckeyes men's basketball team
Players
Coaches

| Pos. | # | Name | Height | Weight | Year | Hometown |
|---|---|---|---|---|---|---|
| C | 13 | Granville Waiters | 6 ft 11 in (2.11 m) | 215 lb (98 kg) | Fr | Columbus, Ohio |
| G | 14 | Kelvin Ransey | 6 ft 1 in (1.85 m) | 170 lb (77 kg) | Sr | Toledo, Ohio |
| C | 32 | Herb Williams | 6 ft 9 in (2.06 m) | 250 lb (113 kg) | Jr | Columbus, Ohio |
| F | 33 | Clark Kellogg | 6 ft 7 in (2.01 m) | 220 lb (100 kg) | Fr | Cleveland, Ohio |
| F | | Bryant Johnson | 6 ft 7 in (2.01 m) | — | So | Washington, D.C. |
| F | 23 | Jim Smith | 6 ft 9 in (2.06 m) | 220 lb (100 kg) | Jr | Cleveland, Ohio |

Head coach

- Eldon Miller (Wittenberg)

Assistant coach(es)

Legend

- (C) Team captain
- (S) Suspended
- (I) Ineligible
- (W) Walk-on
- Injured
- Current redshirt

== Schedule/results ==
| Date time, TV | Rank^{#} | Opponent^{#} | Result | Record | Site (attendance) city, state |
Non-conference regular season
| Dec 1, 1979* | No. 4 | Ohio | W 78–51 | 1–0 | St. John Arena; Columbus, Ohio |
| Dec 8, 1979* | No. 3 | at Stetson | W 69–50 | 2–0 | Edmunds Center; DeLand, Florida |
| Dec 10, 1979* | No. 3 | at West Virginia | W 72–55 | 3–0 | WVU Coliseum; Morgantown, West Virginia |
| Dec 13, 1979* | No. 3 | Cal Poly Pomona | W 87–46 | 4–0 | St. John Arena; Columbus, Ohio |
| Dec 15, 1979* | No. 3 | at Holy Cross | W 79–63 | 5–0 | Hart Center; Worcester, Massachusetts |
| Dec 19, 1979* | No. 2 | at No. 11 Louisville | L 65–75 | 5–1 | Freedom Hall; Louisville, Kentucky |
| Dec 22, 1979* | No. 2 | Tennessee | W 91–65 | 6–1 | St. John Arena; Columbus, Ohio |
| Dec 29, 1979* | No. 7 | Northwestern State | W 71–46 | 7–1 | St. John Arena; Columbus, Ohio |
Big Ten Regular season
| Jan 3, 1980 | No. 5 | No. 11 Indiana | W 59–58 | 8–1 (1–0) | St. John Arena; Columbus, Ohio |
| Jan 5, 1980 | No. 5 | No. 8 Purdue | W 67–58 | 9–1 (2–0) | St. John Arena; Columbus, Ohio |
| Jan 10, 1980 | No. 3 | at No. 12 Iowa | W 77–71 | 10–1 (3–0) | Iowa Field House (13,365); Iowa City, Iowa |
| Jan 12, 1980 | No. 3 | at Northwestern | W 75–63 | 11–1 (4–0) | Welsh-Ryan Arena; Evanston, Illinois |
| Jan 17, 1980 | No. 2 | Minnesota | W 75–70 | 12–1 (5–0) | St. John Arena; Columbus, Ohio |
| Jan 19, 1980 | No. 2 | at Michigan | L 74–75 | 12–2 (5–1) | Crisler Arena; Ann Arbor, Michigan |
| Jan 24, 1980 | No. 4 | at Illinois | W 79–76 | 13–2 (6–1) | Assembly Hall; Champaign, Illinois |
| Jan 26, 1980 | No. 4 | Wisconsin | L 71–72 | 13–3 (6–2) | St. John Arena; Columbus, Ohio |
| Jan 27, 1980* | No. 4 | No. 17 Virginia | W 70–65 | 14–3 | St. John Arena; Columbus, Ohio |
| Jan 31, 1980 | No. 6 | Michigan State | L 54–74 | 14–4 (6–3) | St. John Arena; Columbus, Ohio |
| Feb 2, 1980 | No. 6 | at Wisconsin | L 67–70 | 14–5 (6–4) | Wisconsin Field House; Madison, Wisconsin |
| Feb 7, 1980 | | Michigan | W 66–63 | 15–5 (7–4) | St. John Arena; Columbus, Ohio |
| Feb 9, 1980 | | Michigan State | W 71–59 | 16–5 (8–4) | St. John Arena; Columbus, Ohio |
| Feb 14, 1980 | No. 9 | at Minnesota | L 70–74 | 16–6 (8–5) | Williams Arena; Minneapolis, Minnesota |
| Feb 16, 1980 | No. 9 | Illinois | W 71–57 | 17–6 (9–5) | St. John Arena; Columbus, Ohio |
| Feb 21, 1980 | No. 11 | Northwestern | W 68–59 | 18–6 (10–5) | St. John Arena; Columbus, Ohio |
| Feb 23, 1980 | No. 11 | Iowa | W 70–69 | 19–6 (11–5) | St. John Arena; Columbus, Ohio |
| Feb 28, 1980 | No. 9 | at No. 18 Purdue | W 64–60 | 20–6 (12–5) | Mackey Arena; West Lafayette, Indiana |
| Mar 2, 1980 | No. 9 | at No. 13 Indiana | L 73–76 ^{OT} | 20–7 (12–6) | Assembly Hall; Bloomington, Indiana |
NCAA tournament
| Mar 9, 1980* | (4W) No. 10 | vs. (5W) No. 18 Arizona State; Second Round | W 89–75 | 21–7 | ASU Activity Center; Tempe, Arizona |
| Mar 13, 1980* | (4W) No. 10 | vs. (8W) UCLA; West Regional Semifinal – Sweet Sixteen | L 68–72 | 21–8 | McKale Center; Tucson, Arizona |
*Non-conference game. ^{#}Rankings from AP Poll. (#) Tournament seedings in parentheses. W=West.
