= 1979–80 Indiana Hoosiers men's basketball team =

American college basketball season

1979–80 Indiana Hoosiers men's basketball

Big Ten Champions

NCAA Men's Division I Tournament, Sweet Sixteen
- Conference: Big Ten Conference

Ranking
- Coaches: No. 7
- AP: No. 7
- Record: 21–8 (13–5 Big Ten)
- Head coach: Bobby Knight (9th season)
- Captains: Butch Carter; Mike Woodson
- Home arena: Assembly Hall

1979–80 Big Ten Conference men's basketball standings
	Conf.				Overall
Team	W		L	PCT	W		L	PCT
No. 7 Indiana	13	–	5	.722	21	–	8	.724
No. 10 Ohio State	12	–	6	.667	21	–	8	.724
No. 20 Purdue	11	–	7	.611	23	–	10	.697
Iowa	10	–	8	.556	23	–	10	.697
Minnesota	10	–	8	.556	21	–	11	.656
Illinois	8	–	10	.444	22	–	13	.629
Michigan	8	–	10	.444	17	–	13	.567
Wisconsin	7	–	11	.389	15	–	14	.517
Michigan State	6	–	12	.333	12	–	15	.444
Northwestern	5	–	13	.278	10	–	17	.370
Rankings from AP Poll

The 1979–80 Indiana Hoosiers men's basketball team represented Indiana University. Their head coach was Bobby Knight, who was in his 9th year. The team played its home games in Assembly Hall in Bloomington, Indiana, and was a member of the Big Ten Conference.

The Hoosiers finished the regular season with an overall record of 21–8 and a conference record of 13–5, finishing 1st in the Big Ten Conference. After missing out on the previous NCAA Tournament, IU was invited to participate in the 1980 NCAA tournament as a 2-seed; the Hoosiers advanced to the Sweet Sixteen, but they lost to the 6-seed Purdue Boilermakers.

== Roster ==
No.	Name	Position	Ht.	Year	Hometown
11	Isiah Thomas	G	6–1	Fr.	Chicago, Illinois
20	Jim Thomas	G	6–3	Fr.	Fort Lauderdale, Florida
23	Chuck Franz	G	6–2	Fr.	Clarksville, Indiana
24	Randy Wittman	G/F	6–6	RS So.	Indianapolis, Indiana
30	Ted Kitchel	F	6–8	RS So.	Galveston, Indiana
31	Tony Brown	G	6–2	Fr.	Chicago, Illinois
32	Landon Turner	F/C	6–10	So.	Indianapolis, Indiana
33	Eric Kirchner	F	6–7	Jr.	Edelstein, Illinois
34	Steve Risley	F	6–8	Jr.	Indianapolis, Indiana
40	Glen Grunwald	F	6–9	RS Sr.	Franklin Park, Illinois
41	Butch Carter	G	6–5	Sr.	Middletown, Ohio
42	Mike Woodson	F	6–5	Sr.	Indianapolis, Indiana
44	Phil Isenbarger	F	6–8	Jr.	Muncie, Indiana
45	Ray Tolbert	F/C	6–9	Jr.	Anderson, Indiana
54	Steve Bouchie	F	6–8	Fr.	Washington, Indiana

== Schedule/results ==
Date time, TV	Rank^{#}	Opponent^{#}	Result	Record	Site city, state
Regular season
12/1/1979*	No. 1	Miami (OH)	W 80–52	1–0	Assembly Hall; Bloomington, Indiana
12/7/1979*	No. 1	Xavier; Indiana Classic	W 92–66	2–0	Assembly Hall; Bloomington, Indiana
12/8/1979*	No. 1	UTEP; Indiana Classic	W 75–43	3–0	Assembly Hall; Bloomington, Indiana
12/11/1979*	No. 1	No. 16 Georgetown	W 76–69	4–0	Assembly Hall; Bloomington, Indiana
12/15/1979*	No. 1	at No. 5 Kentucky; Indiana–Kentucky rivalry	L 58–69	4–1	Rupp Arena; Lexington, Kentucky
12/18/1979*	No. 5	vs. Toledo	W 80–56	5–1	Market Square Arena; Indianapolis
12/22/1979*	No. 5	No. 8 North Carolina	L 57–61	5–2	Assembly Hall; Bloomington, Indiana
12/28/1979*	No. 10	vs. Tennessee	W 70–68	6–2	San Diego Sports Arena; San Diego
12/29/1979*	No. 10	vs. Brown	W 61–52	7–2	San Diego Sports Arena; San Diego
1/3/1980	No. 11	at No. 5 Ohio State	L 58–59	7–3 (0–1)	St. John Arena; Columbus, Ohio
1/5/1980	No. 11	at Wisconsin	L 50–52	7–4 (0–2)	Wisconsin Field House; Madison, Wisconsin
1/10/1980	No. 19	Michigan	W 63–61 ^{OT}	8–4 (1–2)	Assembly Hall; Bloomington, Indiana
1/12/1980	No. 19	Michigan State	W 72–64	9–4 (2–2)	Assembly Hall; Bloomington, Indiana
1/17/1980	No. 19	No. 13 Iowa	W 81–69	10–4 (3–2)	Assembly Hall; Bloomington, Indiana
1/19/1980	No. 19	at Northwestern	W 81–72	11–4 (4–2)	Welsh-Ryan Arena; Evanston, Illinois
1/24/1980	No. 16	at Minnesota	L 47–55	11–5 (4–3)	Williams Arena; Minneapolis
1/26/1980	No. 16	No. 17 Purdue; Rivalry	W 69–58	12–5 (5–3)	Assembly Hall; Bloomington, Indiana
1/31/1980	No. 18	Illinois; Rivalry	W 60–54	13–5 (6–3)	Assembly Hall; Bloomington, Indiana
2/2/1980	No. 18	at No. 17 Purdue; Rivalry	L 51–56	13–6 (6–4)	Mackey Arena; West Lafayette, Indiana
2/7/1980	No. 20	Northwestern	W 83–69	14–6 (7–4)	Assembly Hall; Bloomington, Indiana
2/9/1980	No. 20	at Illinois; Rivalry	L 68–89	14–7 (7–5)	Assembly Hall; Champaign, Illinois
2/14/1980		at No. 20 Iowa	W 66–55	15–7 (8–5)	Iowa Field House; Iowa City, Iowa
2/16/1980		Minnesota	W 67–54	16–7 (9–5)	Assembly Hall; Bloomington, Indiana
2/21/1980	No. 19	at Michigan State	W 75–72	17–7 (10–5)	Jenison Fieldhouse; East Lansing, Michigan
2/23/1980	No. 19	at Michigan	W 65–61	18–7 (11–5)	Crisler Arena; Ann Arbor, Michigan
2/28/1980	No. 13	Wisconsin	W 61–52	19–7 (12–5)	Assembly Hall; Bloomington, Indiana
3/2/1980	No. 13	No. 9 Ohio State	W 76–73 ^{OT}	20–7 (13–5)	Assembly Hall; Bloomington, Indiana
NCAA tournament
3/9/1980*	No. 7 (2)	vs. No. (7) Virginia Tech; Second round	W 68–59	21–7 (13–5)	E. A. Diddle Arena; Bowling Green, Kentucky
3/13/1980*	No. 7 (2)	vs. No. 20 (6) Purdue; Sweet Sixteen	L 69–76	21–8 (13–5)	Rupp Arena; Lexington, Kentucky
*Non-conference game. ^{#}Rankings from AP Poll. (#) Tournament seedings in parentheses.
