= Jim Dutcher (basketball) =

American basketball coach (born 1933)

Biographical details
- Born: April 17, 1933 (age 93); Alpena, Michigan, U.S.
- Education: Michigan

Coaching career (HC unless noted)
- 1958–1966: Alpena CC
- 1966–1972: Eastern Michigan
- 1972–1975: Michigan (assistant)
- 1975–1986: Minnesota

Administrative career (AD unless noted)
- 1958–1966: Alpena CC

Head coaching record
- Overall: 312–163

Accomplishments and honors

Championships
- Big Ten regular season (1982)

Awards
- Big Ten Coach of the Year (1982)

Jim Dutcher (born April 17, 1933) is a former head basketball coach at the University of Minnesota.

== Early life and education ==
Dutcher was born and raised in Alpena, Michigan. He graduated from Alpena High School in 1951 where he was class president and a three-sport athlete, earning All-State honors in football and basketball. He attended the University of Michigan, where he received an Elmer Gideon Scholarship to play football and basketball. A member of the Lambda Chi Alpha fraternity, he majored in physical education, graduating with a B.S. in 1955 and earning an M.A. from the University of Michigan in 1961. Dutcher joined the Army in 1955, serving as a member of the 3rd Armored Division and was stationed in Frankfurt, Germany. He coached and played on the 3rd Armored Division Artillery basketball team while in Germany, and also coached the offensive line for the Armored Division football team. Dutcher married his high school sweetheart, Marilyn, in 1957.

== Early coaching career ==
Dutcher began his coaching career at Alpena Community College where he served as Athletic Director and head basketball coach culminating in a trip to the National Junior College Tournament in 1966. He was twice named conference coach of the year. In 1966, he became the head basketball coach at Eastern Michigan University, where he was named National Association of Intercollegiate Athletics (NAIA) District Coach of the Year in 1971 and the National Collegiate Athletic Association (NCAA) District 4, Coach of the Year in 1972.

While at Eastern Michigan, his team played in the NAIA National Tournament in Kansas City in 1967, 1968, 1969, 1970 and 1971; and the NCAA College Division Finals in Evansville, Indiana in 1972. Prominent players Dutcher coached at Eastern Michigan included Kennedy McIntosh, who played with the Seattle SuperSonics; Earl Higgins, who played with the Indiana Pacers; Harvey Marlatt, who played with the Detroit Pistons; and Hall of Famer George Gervin, nicknamed "The Iceman," who played with the Virginia Squires, San Antonio Spurs and Chicago Bulls.

Dutcher became an assistant coach at his alma mater, the University of Michigan, under head coach Johnny Orr. During the 1974-75 season the team won the Big Ten Championship.

== Minnesota head coach ==
Dutcher took over the Gophers program in 1975 following the departure of Bill Musselman. Not long after he arrived, the Gophers were slapped with heavy NCAA sanctions due to violations under Musselman's watch. The Gophers were forced to forfeit the entire 1976-77 season, and were banned from postseason play until 1979.

The Gophers recovered fairly quickly, and in 1982 they won their last "official" Big Ten Conference title and advanced to the Sweet 16 of that year's NCAA Tournament. He was named the Big Ten Coach of the Year in 1982.

Prominent players coached by Dutcher at Minnesota included Ray Williams, who later played for the New York Knicks; Mychal Thompson, who played for the Portland Trail Blazers and Los Angeles Lakers; Kevin McHale, who played for the Boston Celtics; Trent Tucker, who played for the New York Knicks and Chicago Bulls; Randy Breuer, who played for the Milwaukee Bucks, Minnesota Timberwolves, Atlanta Hawks and Sacramento Kings; Flip Saunders, who became an NBA coach for the Minnesota Timberwolves, Detroit Pistons, and Washington Wizards; Osborne Lockhart, who played for the Harlem Globetrotters; Jim Peterson, who played for the Houston Rockets; Darrell Mitchell, who was named first-team All-Big Ten, and Tommy Davis, also a first-team All-Big Ten player.

On January 25, 1986, three Gopher players were arrested on rape charges in Madison, Wisconsin. A Madison woman claimed the players raped her at their team hotel hours after the Gophers played the Wisconsin Badgers. After the arrests, U of M officials forfeited the Gophers' next scheduled game, against Northwestern, citing the arrests and a series of less serious incidents prior to the arrests. Dutcher resigned in protest of the decision to forfeit the game. All three players were ultimately acquitted of all charges.

== Post-coaching career ==
Dutcher went on to become a registered financial advisor and became a Senior Vice President for Royal Bank of Canada-Dain. He retired from RBC in 2005.

== Family ==
Dutcher and his wife Marilyn had four children; son Brian Dutcher is the head basketball coach at San Diego State; daughter Diane McNutt is Vice President of Human Capital at UnitedHealthcare; Judi Dutcher is an attorney, the former Minnesota State Auditor and the CEO of the Bentson Foundation; and Barbara Jacobson is a Director of Market Research at UnitedHealthcare. Marilyn Dutcher died in 2010.

== Head coaching record ==
Record table
Season	Team	Overall	Conference	Standing	Postseason
Eastern Michigan Eagles (Independent) (1966–1972)
1966–67	Eastern Michigan	18–7			NAIA District 23 Playoffs
1967–68	Eastern Michigan	20–9			NAIA Elite Eight
1968–69	Eastern Michigan	20–9			NAIA Second Round
1969–70	Eastern Michigan	22–7			NAIA Second Round
1970–71	Eastern Michigan	23–10			NAIA Runner-Up
1971–72	Eastern Michigan	24–7			NCAA College Division Final Four
Eastern Michigan:		127–49			
Minnesota Golden Gophers (Big Ten) (1975–1986)
1975–76	Minnesota	16–10	8–10	6th	
1976–77	Minnesota	24–3%	15–3%	2nd%	^
1977–78	Minnesota	17–10	12–6	T-2nd	^
1978–79	Minnesota	11–16	6–12	T-8th	
1979–80	Minnesota	21–11	10–8	T-6th	NIT Runner-up
1980–81	Minnesota	19–11	9–9	T-5th	NIT 3rd Place
1981–82	Minnesota	23–6	14–4	1st	NCAA Division I Sweet 16
1982–83	Minnesota	18–11	9–9	T-6th	NIT First Round
1983–84	Minnesota	15–13	6–12	T-8th	
1984–85	Minnesota	13–15	6–12	8th	
1985–86	Minnesota	13–7	3–4	$	
Minnesota:		190–113&	98–89&		
Total:		312–163			
National champion Postseason invitational champion Conference regular season champion Conference regular season and conference tournament champion Division regular season champion Division regular season and conference tournament champion Conference tournament champion

% Entire 1975-76 season was forfeited due to NCAA sanctions from former coach Bill Musselman. Official record is 0-27 (0–18 Big Ten).
^ Team was banned from any postseason tournament in 1976–1978.
$ Dutcher resigned midseason; he was replaced by Jimmy Williams.
& Official record at Minnesota without vacated and forfeited games is 166–137 (83–89 Big Ten).
