= 1979–80 UCLA Bruins men's basketball team =

American college basketball season

1979–80 UCLA Bruins men's basketball

NCAA Tournament, runner-up (vacated)

National Championship Game, L 54-59 vs. Louisville (vacated)
- Conference: Pacific-10
- Record: 17–9, 5 wins and 1 loss vacated (unadjusted 22–10) (12–6, 4th Pac-10)
- Head coach: Larry Brown (1st season)
- Assistant coaches: Larry Farmer; Keith Glass; Kevin O’ Connor
- Home arena: Pauley Pavilion

1979–80 Pacific-10 Conference men's basketball standings
	Conf.				Overall
Team	W		L	PCT	W		L	PCT
^#5 Oregon State	16	–	2	.889	26	–	3	.897
No. 18 Arizona State	15	–	3	.833	22	–	7	.759
Washington State	14	–	4	.778	22	–	6	.786
*UCLA	12	–	6	.667	17	–	9	.654
Washington	9	–	9	.500	18	–	10	.643
Arizona	6	–	12	.333	12	–	15	.444
USC	5	–	13	.278	12	–	15	.444
Oregon	5	–	13	.278	10	–	17	.370
Stanford	5	–	13	.278	7	–	19	.269
California	3	–	15	.167	8	–	19	.296
As of April 15, 1980; *Oregon State vacated all tournament games (0–1) due to NCAA sanctions. Disputed record (16-2, 26-4)^UCLA vacated all tournament games (5–1) due to NCAA sanctions. Disputed record (22-10, 12-6); Rankings from AP Poll

The 1979–80 UCLA Bruins men's basketball team represented the University of California, Los Angeles in the 1979–80 NCAA Division I men's basketball season. Larry Brown began his first year as head coach. The Bruins started the season ranked 8th in the nation (AP Poll). The Bruins started the season 3-0 and climbed to 7th after starting 3–0. UCLA's team finished 4th in the Pac-10 regular season, failing to finish atop the conference for the first time since 1965–66. UCLA participated the NCAA tournament going 5–0 before losing to the Louisville Cardinals in the championship game. The Bruins' five NCAA tournament wins and championship game appearance were later vacated after the NCAA had determined UCLA committed nine violations.

The Bruins fell out the rankings in the poll released on January 14, 1980, ending what currently stands as the second most consecutive weeks ranked in the AP poll with 221. The streak began at the beginning of the Bruins 1966–67 season.

== Starting lineup ==
Position	Player	Class
F	Kiki Vandeweghe	Sr.
F	James Wilkes	Sr.
C	Mike Sanders	So.
G	Michael Holton	Fr.
G	Rod Foster	Fr.

== Roster ==
1979–80 UCLA Bruins men's basketball team
Players
Coaches

Pos.	#	Name	Height	Weight	Year	Hometown
C	32	Darrell Allums	6 ft 9 in (2.06 m)	225 lb (102 kg)	Sr	Los Angeles, California
F	45	Tony Anderson	6 ft 4 in (1.93 m)	195 lb (88 kg)	So	Victorville, California
G	24	Randy Arrillaga	6 ft 1 in (1.85 m)	165 lb (75 kg)	Fr	Saratoga, California
G	30	Darren Daye	6 ft 7 in (2.01 m)	195 lb (88 kg)	Fr	Mission Hills, California
G	10	Rod Foster	6 ft 1 in (1.85 m)	159 lb (72 kg)	Fr	New Britain, Connecticut
G	14	Michael Holton	6 ft 3 in (1.91 m)	182 lb (83 kg)	Fr	Pasadena, California
G/F	43	Chris Lippert	6 ft 5 in (1.96 m)	189 lb (86 kg)	Sr	Reseda, California
G	20	Tyren Naulls	6 ft 3 in (1.91 m)	206 lb (93 kg)	So	Lynwood, California
F	34	Cliff Pruitt	6 ft 7 in (2.01 m)	185 lb (84 kg)	Fr	Los Angeles, California
C	11	Mike Sanders	6 ft 6 in (1.98 m)	205 lb (93 kg)	So	DeRidder, Louisiana
C	31	Gig Sims	6 ft 9 in (2.06 m)	202 lb (92 kg)	Sr	Redondo Beach, California
F	55	Kiki Vandeweghe (C)	6 ft 8 in (2.03 m)	220 lb (100 kg)	Sr	Los Angeles, California
F	35	James Wilkes (C)	6 ft 7 in (2.01 m)	205 lb (93 kg)	Sr	Los Angeles, California

Head coach

Larry Brown (North Carolina)

Assistant coach(es)

- Larry Farmer (UCLA)
- Keith Glass
- Kevin O'Connor

Legend

- (C) Team captain
- (S) Suspended
- (I) Ineligible
- (W) Walk-on
- Injured
- Current redshirt

Roster

== Schedule ==
Date time, TV	Rank^{#}	Opponent^{#}	Result	Record	Site city, state
Regular Season
November 30, 1979*	No. 8	Idaho State	W 82–40	1–0	Pauley Pavilion (9,872); Los Angeles, CA
December 1, 1979*	No. 8	Hofstra	W 90–71	2–0	Pauley Pavilion (9,785); Los Angeles, CA
December 8, 1979*	No. 8	Santa Clara	W 92–79	3–0	Pauley Pavilion (12,238); Los Angeles, CA
December 11, 1979*	No. 7	at No. 4 Notre Dame	L 74–77	3–1	Athletic & Convocation Center (11,345); Notre Dame, Indiana
December 15, 1979*	No. 7	No. 11 DePaul	L 94–99	3–2	Pauley Pavilion (12,072); Los Angeles, CA
December 21, 1979*	No. 14	UC Santa Barbara	W 102–58	4–2	Pauley Pavilion (7,834); Los Angeles, CA
December 22, 1979*	No. 14	Colorado State	W 86–63	5–2	Pauley Pavilion (8,166); Los Angeles, CA
December 28, 1979	No. 16	California	W 73–59	6–2 (1–0)	Pauley Pavilion (12,413); Los Angeles, CA
December 29, 1979	No. 16	Stanford	W 92–60	7–2 (2–0)	Pauley Pavilion (12,473); Los Angeles, CA
January 3, 1980	No. 16	at No. 14 Oregon State	L 67–76	7–3 (2–1)	Beasley Coliseum (10,642); Corvallis, OR
January 5, 1980	No. 16	at Oregon	W 76–62	8–3 (3–1)	McArthur Court (10,000); Eugene, OR
January 12, 1980	No. 16	at USC	L 74–82	8–4 (3–2)	Los Angeles Memorial Sports Arena (14,168); Los Angeles, CA
January 17, 1980		Arizona State	L 76–78	8–5 (3–3)	Pauley Pavilion (12,286); Los Angeles, CA
January 19, 1980*		No. 8 Notre Dame	L 73–80	8–6	Pauley Pavilion (12,193); Los Angeles, CA
January 21, 1980		Arizona	W 69–59	9–6 (4–3)	Pauley Pavilion (10,044); Los Angeles, CA
January 24, 1980		at Washington	W 76–59	10–6 (5–3)	Hec Edmundson Pavilion (5,178); Seattle, WA
January 26, 1980		at Washington State	L 64–80	10–7 (5–4)	Gill Coliseum (11,742); Pullman, WA
January 31, 1980		No. 2 Oregon State	W 93–67	11–7 (6–4)	Pauley Pavilion (12,305); Los Angeles, CA
February 2, 1980		Oregon	W 90–76	12–7 (7–4)	Pauley Pavilion (11,952); Los Angeles, CA
February 9, 1980		USC	W 91–64	13–7 (8–4)	Pauley Pavilion (12,383); Los Angeles, CA
February 16, 1980		at Arizona	W 90–78	14–7 (9–4)	McKale Center (14,486); Tucson, AZ
February 18, 1980		at No. 18 Arizona State	L 80–92	14–8 (9–5)	Wells Fargo Arena (9,638); Tempe, AZ
February 21, 1980		No. 20 Washington State	W 80–66	15–8 (10–5)	Pauley Pavilion (11,652); Los Angeles, CA
February 23, 1980		Washington	L 70–72	15–9 (10–6)	Pauley Pavilion (11,813); Los Angeles, CA
February 28, 1980		at Stanford	W 75–62	16–9 (11–6)	Maples Pavilion (5,892); Stanford, CA
March 1, 1980		at California	W 83–58	17–9 (12–6)	Harmon Gym (6,500); Berkeley, CA
NCAA Tournament
March 7, 1980*		vs. Old Dominion; First Round	W 87–74 (vacated)	18–9	Wells Fargo Arena (9,250); Tempe, AZ
March 9, 1980*		vs. No. 1 DePaul; Second Round	W 77–71 (vacated)	19–9	Wells Fargo Arena (14,468); Tempe, AZ
March 13, 1980*		vs. No. 10 Ohio State; Sweet Sixteen	W 72–68 (vacated)	20–9	McKale Center (7,670); Tucson, AZ
March 15, 1980*		vs. Clemson; Elite Eight	W 85–74 (vacated)	21–9	McKale Center (6,355); Tucson, AZ
March 22, 1980*		vs. Purdue; Final Four	W 67–62 (vacated)	22–9	Market Square Arena (16,637); Indianapolis, IN
March 24, 1980*		vs. No. 2 Louisville; Championship Game	L 54–59 (vacated)	22–10	Market Square Arena (16,637); Indianapolis, IN
*Non-conference game. ^{#}Rankings from AP Poll. (#) Tournament seedings in parentheses. All times are in Pacific Time.

== Notes ==
- Adding in the NCAA Tournament opponents, UCLA played eleven teams ranked in the AP Top-20 (at the time). This was over one-third of all opponents (11 of 32).
- UCLA beat #1 Depaul in the NCAA Tournament. This was the second consecutive year that UCLA had beaten a #1 team (either during the season or in the tournament).
- All 5 UCLA victories in the tournament and the championship loss were vacated by the NCAA for 9 infractions. They were also placed on two years' probation, which included a one-year NCAA tournament ban and an order to vacate its 1980 NCAA tournament appearance.
