= 1979–80 Purdue Boilermakers men's basketball team =

American college basketball season

1979–80 Purdue Boilermakers men's basketball

NCAA tournament, Final Four
- Conference: Big Ten Conference

Ranking
- AP: No. 20
- Record: 23–10 (11–7 Big Ten)
- Head coach: Lee Rose (2nd season)
- Assistant coaches: Everett Bass; Billy Keller; Jeff Meyer
- Home arena: Mackey Arena

The 1979–80 Purdue Boilermakers men's basketball team represented Purdue University during the 1979–80 NCAA Division I men's basketball season. The Boilermakers were led by second season coach Lee Rose. For the first time since 1969, the team reached the Final Four, a feat not repeated until 2024.

1979–80 Big Ten Conference men's basketball standings
	Conf.				Overall
Team	W		L	PCT	W		L	PCT
No. 7 Indiana	13	–	5	.722	21	–	8	.724
No. 10 Ohio State	12	–	6	.667	21	–	8	.724
No. 20 Purdue	11	–	7	.611	23	–	10	.697
Iowa	10	–	8	.556	23	–	10	.697
Minnesota	10	–	8	.556	21	–	11	.656
Illinois	8	–	10	.444	22	–	13	.629
Michigan	8	–	10	.444	17	–	13	.567
Wisconsin	7	–	11	.389	15	–	14	.517
Michigan State	6	–	12	.333	12	–	15	.444
Northwestern	5	–	13	.278	10	–	17	.370
Rankings from AP Poll

== Roster ==
1979–80 Purdue Boilermakers men's basketball team
Players
Coaches

Pos.	#	Name	Height	Weight	Year	Hometown
G	21	John Anthrop	5 ft 11 in (1.8 m)	175 lb (79 kg)	Sr	Lafayette, Indiana
G	44	Roosevelt Barnes	6 ft 2 in (1.88 m)	195 lb (88 kg)	Jr	Fort Wayne, Indiana
C	35	Ted Benson	6 ft 10 in (2.08 m)	225 lb (102 kg)	Fr	Atlanta, Georgia
C	22	Joe Barry Carroll	7 ft 1 in (2.16 m)	245 lb (111 kg)	Sr	Denver, Colorado
G	24	Lee Cummings	6 ft 2 in (1.88 m)	180 lb (82 kg)	So	Chicago, Illinois
G	11	Keith Edmonson	6 ft 5 in (1.96 m)	195 lb (88 kg)	So	San Antonio, Texas
F	45	Arnette Hallman	6 ft 7 in (2.01 m)	205 lb (93 kg)	Sr	Chicago, Illinois
G	41	Jon Kitchell	6 ft 5 in (1.96 m)	195 lb (88 kg)	So	Galveston, Indiana
G/F	33	Drake Morris	6 ft 5 in (1.96 m)	195 lb (88 kg)	Jr	East Chicago, Indiana
F	23	Michael Scearce	6 ft 7 in (2.01 m)	210 lb (95 kg)	So	Lexington, Kentucky
G	32	Kevin Stallings	6 ft 5 in (1.96 m)	200 lb (91 kg)	So	Collinsville, Illinois
G	20	Brian Walker	6 ft 2 in (1.88 m)	185 lb (84 kg)	Jr	Lebanon, Indiana
F	12	Steve Walker	6 ft 5 in (1.96 m)	210 lb (95 kg)	Sr	Lebanon, Indiana

Head coach

Lee Rose

Assistant coach(es)

- Everett Bass
- Billy Keller
- Jeff Meyer

Legend

- (C) Team captain
- (S) Suspended
- (I) Ineligible
- (W) Walk-on
- Injured
- Current redshirt

Roster
Last update: October 14, 2026

== Schedule and results ==
During the 1980 NCAA Division I men's basketball tournament, Purdue qualified for the Final Four, where they lost to UCLA.

Date time, TV	Rank^{#}	Opponent^{#}	Result	Record	Site city, state
Regular Season
November 30, 1979*	No. 11	at Colorado State	W 65–55	1–0	Moby Arena; Fort Collins, CO
December 3, 1979*	No. 12	Butler	W 83–60	2–0	Mackey Arena; West Lafayette, IN
December 8, 1979*	No. 12	Providence	W 76–44	3–0	Mackey Arena; West Lafayette, IN
December 11, 1979*	No. 9	Nebraska	W 78–56	4–0	Mackey Arena; West Lafayette, IN
December 21, 1979*	No. 9	vs. SMU; UK Invitation Tournament	W 85–60	5–0	Rupp Arena; Lexington, KY
December 22, 1979*	No. 9	at No. 3 Kentucky; UK Invitation Tournament • Final	L 60–61	5–1	Rupp Arena; Lexington, KY
December 29, 1979*	No. 8	Tulsa	W 82–58	6–1	Mackey Arena; West Lafayette, IN
January 3, 1980	No. 8	at Michigan State	W 74–73	7–1 (1–0)	Jenison Field House; East Lansing, MI
January 5, 1980	No. 8	at No. 5 Ohio State	L 58–67	7–2 (1–1)	St. John Arena; Columbus, OH
January 10, 1980	No. 10	Illinois	W 74–66	8–2 (2–1)	Mackey Arena; West Lafayette, IN
January 12, 1980	No. 10	Michigan	W 63–61	9–2 (3–1)	Mackey Arena; West Lafayette, IN
January 13, 1980*	No. 10	No. 5 Syracuse	L 61–66	9–3	Mackey Arena; West Lafayette, IN
January 17, 1980	No. 11	Northwestern	W 68–63	10–3 (4–1)	Mackey Arena; West Lafayette, IN
January 19, 1980	No. 11	at Minnesota	L 61–67	10–4 (4–2)	Williams Arena; Minneapolis, MN
January 24, 1980	No. 14	at Wisconsin	W 73–60	11–4 (5–2)	Wisconsin Field House; Madison, WI
January 26, 1980	No. 14	at No. 16 Indiana; Rivalry	L 58–69	11–5 (5–3)	Assembly Hall; Bloomington, IN
January 31, 1980	No. 17	Iowa	W 70–56	12–5 (6–3)	Mackey Arena; West Lafayette, IN
February 2, 1980	No. 17	No. 18 Indiana; Rivalry	W 56–51	13–5 (7–3)	Mackey Arena; West Lafayette, IN
February 7, 1980	No. 12	Minnesota	W 58–56	14–5 (8–3)	Mackey Arena; West Lafayette, IN
February 9, 1980	No. 12	at Iowa	L 59–74	14–6 (8–4)	Iowa Field House; Iowa City, IA
February 14, 1980	No. 15	at Northwestern	L 54–57	14–7 (8–5)	McGaw Memorial Hall; Evanston, IL
February 16, 1980	No. 15	Wisconsin	W 69–61	15–7 (9–5)	Mackey Arena; West Lafayette, IN
February 21, 1980	No. 15	at Michigan	L 64–75	15–8 (9–6)	Crisler Arena; Ann Arbor, MI
February 23, 1980	No. 15	at Illinois	W 72–69	16–8 (10–6)	Assembly Hall; Champaign, IL
February 28, 1980	No. 18	No. 9 Ohio State	L 60–64	16–9 (10–7)	Mackey Arena; West Lafayette, IN
March 1, 1980	No. 18	Michigan State	W 91–73	17–9 (11–7)	Mackey Arena; West Lafayette, IN
NCAA Tournament
March 6, 1980*	(ME6) No. 20	vs. (ME11) La Salle; Regional first round	W 90–82	18–9	Mackey Arena; West Lafayette, IN
March 8, 1980*	(ME6) No. 20	vs. (ME3) No. 13 St. John's (NY); Regional quarterfinals	W 87–72	19–9	Mackey Arena; West Lafayette, IN
March 13, 1980*	(ME6) No. 20	vs. (ME2) No. 7 Indiana; Regional semifinals	W 76–69	20–9	Rupp Arena; Lexington, KY
March 15, 1980*	(ME6) No. 20	vs. (ME4) No. 14 Duke; Regional finals	W 68–60	21–9	Rupp Arena; Lexington, KY
March 22, 1980*	(ME6) No. 20	vs. (W8) UCLA; Final Four	L 62–67	21–10 (Note: UCLA vacated its appearance in the 1980 NCAA Tournament after the NCAA had determined that the Bruins committed nine major violations. Unlike forfeiture, a vacated game does not result in the other school being credited with a win, only with the removal of any UCLA wins from all records.)	Market Square Arena; New York, NY
March 24, 1980*	(ME6) No. 20	vs. (E5) Iowa; Third place game	W 75–58	22–10	Market Square Arena; New York, NY
*Non-conference game. ^{#}Rankings from AP Poll. (#) Tournament seedings in parentheses. ME=Mideast. W=West. E=East.

=== NCAA basketball tournament ===
- Mideast
  - #20 (AP) Purdue (#6 seed) 90, LaSalle (#11 seed) 82
  - #20 (AP) Purdue 87, #13 (AP) St. John's, (NY) (#3 seed) 72
  - #20 (AP) Purdue 76, #7 (AP) Indiana (#2 seed) 69
  - #20 (AP) Purdue 68, #14 (AP) Duke (# 4 seed) 60
- Final Four
  - UCLA (#8 seed) 67, #20 (AP) Purdue (#6 seed) 62
  - #20 (AP) Purdue (#6 seed) 75, Iowa (#5 seed) 58 (3rd Place / Consolation Game)

== Rankings ==
Ranking movements Legend: ██ Increase in ranking ██ Decrease in ranking — = Not ranked т = Tied with team above or below
	Week														
Poll	Pre	1	2	3	4	5	6	7	8	9	10	11	12	13	Final
AP	11	12	9	9	8	8	10	11	14	17	12	15	15	18	20
Coaches	11	9	9	8т	9	7	9	11	15	20	10	12	15	—	—

== Team players drafted into the NBA ==
Round	Pick	Player	NBA club
1	1	Joe Barry Carroll	Golden State Warriors
2	46	Arnette Hallman	Boston Celtics
