= 1979–80 Michigan Wolverines men's basketball team =

American college basketball season

1979–80 Michigan Wolverines men's basketball

NIT, Quarterfinals
- Conference: Big Ten Conference
- Record: 17–13 (8–10 Big Ten)
- Head coach: Johnny Orr
- Assistant coaches: Bill Frieder; Mike Boyd; Tom Kempf; Don Sicko
- MVP: Mike McGee
- Captains: Marty Bodnar; Mark Lozier
- Home arena: Crisler Arena

1979–80 Big Ten Conference men's basketball standings
	Conf.				Overall
Team	W		L	PCT	W		L	PCT
No. 7 Indiana	13	–	5	.722	21	–	8	.724
No. 10 Ohio State	12	–	6	.667	21	–	8	.724
No. 20 Purdue	11	–	7	.611	23	–	10	.697
Iowa	10	–	8	.556	23	–	10	.697
Minnesota	10	–	8	.556	21	–	11	.656
Illinois	8	–	10	.444	22	–	13	.629
Michigan	8	–	10	.444	17	–	13	.567
Wisconsin	7	–	11	.389	15	–	14	.517
Michigan State	6	–	12	.333	12	–	15	.444
Northwestern	5	–	13	.278	10	–	17	.370
Rankings from AP Poll

The 1979–80 Michigan Wolverines men's basketball team represented the University of Michigan in intercollegiate college basketball during the 1979–80 NCAA Division I men's basketball season. The team played its home games in the Crisler Arena in Ann Arbor, Michigan, and was a member of the Big Ten Conference. Under the direction of head coach Johnny Orr who was in his final year as coach, the team finished tied for sixth in the Big Ten Conference. The team earned an invitation to the 1980 National Invitation Tournament. The team was unranked the entire season in the Associated Press Top Twenty Poll, and it also ended the season unranked in the final UPI Coaches' Poll. The team defeated two of the six ranked teams it faced (#2 Ohio State 75–74 at home on January 19, 1980, and #15 Purdue at home 75–64 on February 21). Marty Bodnar earned third team Academic All-American honors. Bodnar and Mark Lozier served as team captains, while Mike McGee earned team MVP honors. John Garris set the School record for career blocked shot average with 1.09, which lasted until 1986 when Roy Tarpley ended his career with a 2.06 average. On January 26, 1980, McGee became the first Wolverine to play more than 50 minutes in a single game when he was on the floor for 54 minutes against the Northwestern Wildcats, surpassing Phil Hubbard's 1976 50-minute effort. Mark Bodnar became the first Michigan Wolverines player on record to total 13 assists in a game on December 13, 1980, against the Dayton Flyers. No Wolverine would surpass 13 assists in a game until Gary Grant did so on December 7, 1987. Thad Garner averaged of 36.3 minutes per game, which was a school record, beating Mike McGee who averaged 36.2. He would break his own record two years later.

In the 32-team National Invitation Tournament, Michigan advanced to the elite eight round by defeating Nebraska Cornhuskers 76–69 and UTEP Miners 75–65 before losing to Virginia Cavaliers 79–68.

== Roster ==
1979–80 Michigan Wolverines men's basketball team
Players
Coaches

Pos.	#	Name	Height	Weight	Year	Hometown
G	30	Mark Bodner	6 ft 3 in (1.91 m)	175 lb (79 kg)	Jr	Barberton, Ohio
G	24	Martin Bodner	6 ft 3 in (1.91 m)	175 lb (79 kg)	Jr	Barberton, Ohio
F	15	Paul Heuerman	6 ft 8 in (2.03 m)	200 lb (91 kg)	Jr	Akron, Ohio
G	34	Johnny Johnson	6 ft 4 in (1.93 m)	200 lb (91 kg)	Jr	Buffalo, New York
F	40	Mike McGee	6 ft 6 in (1.98 m)	200 lb (91 kg)	Jr	Omaha, Nebraska

Head coach

- Johnny Orr

Assistant coach(es)

Legend

- (C) Team captain
- (S) Suspended
- (I) Ineligible
- (W) Walk-on
- Injured
- Current redshirt

== Team players drafted into the NBA ==
Five players from this team were selected in the NBA draft.

Year	Round	Pick	Overall	Player	NBA Club
1981	1	19	19	Mike McGee	Los Angeles Lakers
1981	3	23	69	John Johnson	Boston Celtics
1981	5	20	112	Paul Heuerman	Phoenix Suns
1982	7	3	141	Thad Gardner	Utah Jazz
1983	10	7	213	Ike Person	Detroit Pistons

== See also ==
- NIT all-time team records
- NIT bids by school and conference
- NIT championships and semifinal appearances
- 1980 in Michigan
