= 1980 National Invitation Tournament =

Annual NCAA college basketball competition

- Season: 1979–80
- Teams: 32
- Finals site: Madison Square Garden, New York City
- Champions: Virginia Cavaliers (1st title)
- Runner-up: Minnesota Golden Gophers (1st title game)
- Semifinalists: Illinois Fighting Illini (1st semifinal); UNLV Runnin' Rebels (1st semifinal)
- Winning coach: Terry Holland (1st title)
- MVP: Ralph Sampson (Virginia)

The 1980 National Invitation Tournament was the 1980 edition of the annual NCAA college basketball competition.

== Selected teams ==
Below is a list of the 32 teams selected for the tournament.

- Alabama
- Boston College
- Boston University
- Bowling Green
- Connecticut
- Duquesne
- Grambling
- Illinois
- Illinois State
- Jacksonville
- Lafayette
- Long Beach State
- Loyola (IL)
- Michigan
- Minnesota
- Mississippi
- Murray State
- Nebraska
- Penn State
- Pepperdine
- Pittsburgh
- Saint Joseph's
- Saint Peter's
- Southwestern Louisiana
- Texas
- UAB
- UTEP
- UNLV
- Virginia
- Washington
- West Texas State
- Wichita State

== Brackets ==
Below are the four first round brackets, along with the four-team championship bracket.

First Round
UNLV	93
Washington	73
Long Beach State	104
Pepperdine	87
Duquesne	65
Pittsburgh	63
Saint Peter's	71
Connecticut	56

Second Round
UNLV	90
Long Beach State	81
Duquesne	33
Saint Peter's	34

Quarterfinals
UNLV	67
Saint Peter's	63

First Round
Virginia	67
Lafayette	56
Boston College	95
Boston University	74
Michigan	76
Nebraska	69
UTEP	58
Wichita State	56

Second Round
Virginia	57
Boston College	55
Michigan	75
UTEP	65

Quarterfinals
Virginia	79
Michigan	68

First Round
Minnesota	64
Bowling Green	50
Mississippi	76
Grambling	74
Texas	70
Saint Joseph's	61
Southwestern Louisiana	74
UAB	72

Second Round
Minnesota	58
Mississippi	56
Texas	76
Southwestern Louisiana	77

Quarterfinals
Minnesota	94
Southwestern Louisiana	73

First Round
Illinois	105
Loyola (IL)	87
Illinois State	80
West Texas State	63
Alabama	53
Penn State	49
Murray State	53
Jacksonville	49

Second Round
Illinois	75
Illinois State	65
Alabama	62
Murray State	70

Quarterfinals
Illinois	65
Murray State	63

=== Semifinals & finals ===
Semifinals
UNLV	71
Virginia	90
Minnesota	65
Illinois	63

Finals
Virginia	58
Minnesota	55

Third place game
UNLV	74
Illinois	84

== See also ==
- 1980 NCAA Division I basketball tournament
- 1980 NCAA Division II basketball tournament
- 1980 NCAA Division III basketball tournament
- 1980 NAIA basketball tournament
- 1980 National Women's Invitational Tournament
