= James Wilkes =

American basketball player (born 1958)

Personal information
- Born: April 1, 1958 (age 68) Nashville, Tennessee, U.S.
- Listed height: 6 ft 7 in (2.01 m)
- Listed weight: 195 lb (88 kg)

Career information
- High school: Susan Miller Dorsey (Los Angeles, California)
- College: UCLA (1976–1980)
- NBA draft: 1980: 3rd round, 50th overall pick
- Drafted by: Chicago Bulls
- Playing career: 1980–1983
- Position: Small forward
- Number: 32, 34

Career history
- 1980–1982: Chicago Bulls
- 1982–1983: Detroit Spirits
- 1983: Detroit Pistons

Career highlights
- CBA champion (1983); Third-team Parade All-American (1976)
- Stats at NBA.com
- Stats at Basketball Reference

James Robert Wilkes (born April 1, 1958) is an American former professional basketball player. Born in Nashville, Tennessee, Wilkes was raised in Los Angeles, where he attended Susan Miller Dorsey High School. In his senior year, he was named 1976 Los Angeles City Section 4A co-player of the year as he led Dorsey to the city championship.

Wlikes then attended UCLA; as a 6'7" forward, he was regarded as a defensive specialist and was often assigned to guard the opponent's top scoring forward. In the third round of the 1980 NBA draft, Wilkes was selected by the Chicago Bulls. He played three NBA seasons (1980–1983) with the Bulls and Detroit Pistons, scoring 547 total points.

Wilkes played for the Detroit Spirits of the Continental Basketball Association (CBA) during the 1982–83 season and won the CBA championship.

== Career statistics ==
Legend
GP	Games played	GS	Games started	MPG	Minutes per game
FG%	Field goal percentage	3P%	3-point field goal percentage	FT%	Free throw percentage
RPG	Rebounds per game	APG	Assists per game	SPG	Steals per game
BPG	Blocks per game	PPG	Points per game	**Bold**	Career high

=== NBA ===
==== Regular season ====
Year	Team	GP	GS	MPG	FG%	3P%	FT%	RPG	APG	SPG	BPG	PPG
1980–81	Chicago	48		11.3	.462	.000	.690	2.0	.6	**.5**	**.3**	4.1
1981–82	Chicago	**57**	**22**	**15.1**	**.481**	.000	.725	**2.8**	**1.1**	**.5**	**.3**	**5.5**
1982–83	Detroit	9	0	14.3	.324	.000	**.800**	2.1	**1.1**	.3	.1	3.8
Career		114	22	13.4	.463	.000	.723	2.4	.9	.5	.3	4.8

==== Playoffs ====
Year	Team	GP	MPG	FG%	3P%	FT%	RPG	APG	SPG	BPG	PPG
1981	Chicago	2	2.5	.000	–	–	.5	.5	.5	.0	.0
