= 1980 NCAA Division I basketball tournament =

Edition of USA college basketball tournament

- Season: 1979–80
- Teams: 48
- Finals site: Market Square Arena, Indianapolis, Indiana
- Champions: Louisville Cardinals (1st title, 1st title game, 4th Final Four)
- Runner-up: UCLA Bruins (Vacated) (11th title game, 14th Final Four)
- Semifinalists: Iowa Hawkeyes (3rd Final Four); Purdue Boilermakers (2nd Final Four)
- Winning coach: Denny Crum (1st title)
- MOP: Darrell Griffith (Louisville)
- Attendance: 321,260
- Top scorer: Joe Barry Carroll (Purdue) (160 points)

The 1980 NCAA Division I basketball tournament involved 48 schools playing in single-elimination play to determine the national champion of men's NCAA Division I college basketball. The 42nd annual edition of the tournament began on March 6, 1980, and ended with the championship game on March 24, at Market Square Arena in Indianapolis. This was the last Final Four to be held at Market Square Arena, as it was demolished in 2001. A total of 48 games were played, including a national third-place game.

Louisville, coached by Denny Crum, won the national title with a 59–54 victory in the final game over UCLA, coached by Larry Brown. Darrell Griffith of Louisville was named the tournament's Most Outstanding Player.

Structurally speaking, this was the first tournament of the modern era. For the first time:

1. An unlimited number of at-large teams could come from any conference. (From 1975 to 1979, conferences were allowed only one at-large entry.)
2. The bracket was seeded to make each region as evenly competitive as possible. (Previously, geographic considerations had trumped this.)
3. All teams were seeded solely based on the subjective judgment of the committee. (In 1979, seeding was partially based on the prior performance of a conference winner's conference.)

In this, the second year the tournament field was seeded, no #1 seed reached the Final Four. Since then, it has happened three other times, in 2006, 2011, and 2023. Purdue University's next Final Four appearance after this year would occur in 2024. Five coaches from teams in the Eastern bracket (Jim Boeheim, John Thompson, Lute Olson, Rick Pitino and Rollie Massimino) would later win their first (and in Pitino's case, the first of more than one) national championship.

UCLA would forfeit its second place in the standings in 1980 after players representing the school were declared ineligible by the NCAA.

== Schedule and venues ==
1980 sites for first and second round games
1980 Regionals (blue) and Final Four (red)

The following are the sites that were selected to host each round of the 1980 tournament:

First and Second Rounds

- March 6 and 8
  - East Region
    - Greensboro Memorial Coliseum, Greensboro, North Carolina (Host: Atlantic Coast Conference)
  - Mideast Region
    - Mackey Arena, West Lafayette, Indiana (Host: Purdue University)
  - Midwest Region
    - Bob Devaney Sports Center, Lincoln, Nebraska (Host: University of Nebraska–Lincoln)
  - West Region
    - Dee Events Center, Ogden, Utah (Host: Weber State University)
- March 7 and 9
  - East Region
    - Providence Civic Center, Providence, Rhode Island (Host: Providence College)
  - Mideast Region
    - E.A. Diddle Arena, Bowling Green, Kentucky (Host: Western Kentucky University)
  - Midwest Region
    - UNT Coliseum, Denton, Texas (Host: North Texas State University)
  - West Region
    - ASU Activity Center, Tempe, Arizona (Host: Arizona State University)

Regional semifinals and finals (Sweet Sixteen and Elite Eight)

- March 13 and 15
  - Mideast Regional, Rupp Arena, Lexington, Kentucky (Host: University of Kentucky)
  - West Regional, McKale Center, Tucson, Arizona (Host: University of Arizona)
- March 14 and 16
  - East Regional, The Spectrum, Philadelphia, Pennsylvania (Hosts: The Philadelphia Big 5 – Villanova University, Temple University, La Salle University, Saint Joseph's University, University of Pennsylvania)
  - Midwest Regional, The Summit, Houston, Texas (Hosts: University of Houston, Rice University, Southwest Conference)

National semifinals, 3rd-place game, and championship (Final Four and championship)

- March 22 and 24
  - Market Square Arena, Indianapolis, Indiana (Hosts: Butler University, Midwestern City Conference)

== Teams ==
Region	Seed	Team	Coach	Conference	Finished	Final Opponent	Score
East
East	1	Syracuse	Jim Boeheim	Big East	Sweet 16	5 Iowa	L 88–77
East	2	Maryland	Lefty Driesell	Atlantic Coast	Sweet Sixteen	3 Georgetown	L 74–68
East	3	Georgetown	John Thompson	Big East	Regional Runner-up	5 Iowa	L 81–80
East	4	NC State	Norm Sloan	Atlantic Coast	Round of 32	5 Iowa	L 77–64
East	5	Iowa	Lute Olson	Big Ten	4th Place	2 Purdue	L 75–58
East	6	Iona	Jim Valvano	ECAC Metro	Round of 32	3 Georgetown	L 74–71
East	7	Tennessee	Don DeVoe	Southeastern	Round of 32	2 Maryland	L 86–75
East	8	Villanova	Rollie Massimino	Eastern	Round of 32	1 Syracuse	L 97–83
East	9	Marquette	Hank Raymonds	Independent	Round of 48	8 Villanova	L 77–59
East	10	Furman	Eddie Holbrook	Southern	Round of 48	7 Tennessee	L 80–69
East	11	Holy Cross	George Blaney	ECAC North	Round of 48	6 Iona	L 84–78
East	12	VCU	J. D. Barnett	Sun Belt	Round of 48	5 Iowa	L 86–72
Mideast
Mideast	1	Kentucky	Joe B. Hall	Southeastern	Sweet Sixteen	4 Duke	L 55–54
Mideast	2	Indiana	Bob Knight	Big Ten	Sweet Sixteen	6 Purdue	L 76–69
Mideast	3	St. John's	Lou Carnesecca	Big East	Round of 32	6 Purdue	L 87–72
Mideast	4	Duke	Bill E. Foster	Atlantic Coast	Regional Runner-up	6 Purdue	L 68–60
Mideast	5	Washington State	George Raveling	Pacific-10	Round of 48	12 Penn	L 62–55
Mideast	6	Purdue	Lee Rose	Big Ten	3rd Place	5 Iowa	W 75–58
Mideast	7	Virginia Tech	Charles Moir	Metro	Round of 32	2 Indiana	L 68–59
Mideast	8	Florida State	Joe Williams	Metro	Round of 32	1 Kentucky	L 97–78
Mideast	9	Toledo	Bob Nichols	Mid-American	Round of 48	8 Florida State	L 94–91
Mideast	10	Western Kentucky	Gene Keady	Ohio Valley	Round of 48	7 Virginia Tech	L 89–85
Mideast	11	La Salle	Lefty Ervin	East Coast	Round of 48	6 Purdue	L 90–82
Mideast	12	Penn	Bob Weinhauer	Ivy League	Round of 32	4 Duke	L 52–42
Midwest
Midwest	1	LSU	Dale Brown	Southeastern	Regional Runner-up	2 Louisville	L 86–66
Midwest	2	Louisville	Denny Crum	Metro	Champion	8 UCLA	W 59–54
Midwest	3	North Carolina	Dean Smith	Atlantic Coast	Round of 32	6 Texas A&M	L 78–61
Midwest	4	Notre Dame	Digger Phelps	Independent	Round of 32	5 Missouri	L 87–84
Midwest	5	Missouri	Norm Stewart	Big Eight	Sweet Sixteen	1 LSU	L 68–63
Midwest	6	Texas A&M	Shelby Metcalf	Southwest	Sweet Sixteen	2 Louisville	L 66–55
Midwest	7	Kansas State	Jack Hartman	Big Eight	Round of 32	2 Louisville	L 71–69
Midwest	8	Alcorn State	Davey Whitney	Southwestern Athletic	Round of 32	1 LSU	L 98–88
Midwest	9	South Alabama	Cliff Ellis	Sun Belt	Round of 48	8 Alcorn State	L 70–62
Midwest	10	Arkansas	Eddie Sutton	Southwest	Round of 48	7 Kansas State	L 71–53
Midwest	11	Bradley	Dick Versace	Missouri Valley	Round of 48	6 Texas A&M	L 55–53
Midwest	12	San Jose State	Bill Berry	Pacific Coast	Round of 48	5 Missouri	L 61–51
West
West	1	DePaul	Ray Meyer	Independent	Round of 32	8 UCLA	L 77–71
West	2	Oregon State	Ralph Miller	Pacific-10	Round of 32	10 Lamar	L 81–77
West	3	BYU	Frank Arnold	Western Athletic	Round of 32	6 Clemson	L 71–66
West	4	Ohio State	Eldon Miller	Big Ten	Sweet Sixteen	8 UCLA	L 72–68
West	5	Arizona State	Ned Wulk	Pacific-10	Round of 32	4 Ohio State	L 89–75
West	6	Clemson	Bill Foster	Atlantic Coast	Regional Runner-up	8 UCLA	L 85–74
West	7	Weber State	Neil McCarthy	Big Sky	Round of 48	10 Lamar	L 87–86
West	8	UCLA	Larry Brown	Pacific-10	Runner Up	2 Louisville	L 59–54
West	9	Old Dominion	Paul Webb	ECAC South	Round of 48	8 UCLA	L 87–74
West	10	Lamar	Billy Tubbs	Southland	Sweet Sixteen	6 Clemson	L 74–66
West	11	Utah State	Rod Tueller	Pacific Coast	Round of 48	6 Clemson	L 76–73
West	12	Loyola Marymount	Ron Jacobs	West Coast	Round of 48	5 Arizona State	L 99–71

== Bracket ==
* – Denotes overtime period.

=== East region ===
First round
8	Villanova	77
9	Marquette	59
5	Iowa	86
12	VCU	72
6	Iona	84
11	Holy Cross	78
7	Tennessee	80
10	Furman	69

Quarter-finals
8	Villanova	83
1	Syracuse	97
4	NC State	64
5	Iowa	77
6	Iona	71
3	Georgetown	74
2	Maryland	86
7	Tennessee	75

Regional semifinals
1	Syracuse	77
5	Iowa	88
3	Georgetown	74
2	Maryland	68

Regional Finals
5	Iowa	81
3	Georgetown	80

=== Midwest region ===
First round
8	Alcorn State	70
9	South Alabama	62
5	Missouri	61
12	San Jose State	51
6	Texas A&M	55
11	Bradley	53
7	Kansas State	71
10	Arkansas	53

Quarter-finals
8	Alcorn State	88
1	LSU	98
4	Notre Dame	84*
5	Missouri	87
6	Texas A&M	78
3	North Carolina	61**
2	Louisville	71
7	Kansas State	69*

Regional semifinals
1	LSU	68
5	Missouri	63
6	Texas A&M	55*
2	Louisville	66

Regional Finals
1	LSU	66
2	Louisville	86

=== Mideast region ===
First round
8	Florida State	94
9	Toledo	91
5	Washington State	55
12	Penn	62
6	Purdue	90
11	La Salle	82
7	Virginia Tech	89
10	Western Kentucky	85*

Quarter-finals
8	Florida State	78
1	Kentucky	97
4	Duke	52
12	Penn	42
6	Purdue	87
3	St. John's	72
2	Indiana	68
7	Virginia Tech	59

Regional semifinals
1	Kentucky	54
4	Duke	55
6	Purdue	76
2	Indiana	69

Regional Finals
4	Duke	60
6	Purdue	68

=== West region ===
First round
8	~~UCLA~~#	87
9	Old Dominion	74
5	Arizona State	99
12	Loyola Marymount	71
6	Clemson	76
11	Utah State	73
7	Weber State	86
10	Lamar	87

Quarter-finals
8	~~UCLA~~#	77
1	DePaul	71
4	Ohio State	89
5	Arizona State	75
6	Clemson	71
3	BYU	66
2	Oregon State	77
10	Lamar	81

Regional semifinals
8	~~UCLA~~#	72
4	Ohio State	68
6	Clemson	74
10	Lamar	66

Regional Finals
8	~~UCLA~~#	85
6	Clemson	74

=== Final Four ===
National semifinals Saturday, March 22
E5	Iowa	72
MW2	Louisville	80
ME6	Purdue	62
W8	~~UCLA~~#	67

National Championship; Monday, March 24
MW2	Louisville	59
W8	~~UCLA~~#	54
National third-place game
E5	Iowa	58
ME6	Purdue	75

# — UCLA vacated its appearance in the 1980 NCAA Tournament after the NCAA had determined that the Bruins committed nine major violations. Unlike forfeiture, a vacated game does not result in the other school being credited with a win, only with the removal of any UCLA wins from all records.

== Announcers ==
- Dick Enberg, Billy Packer, and Al McGuire – Mideast Regional Final at Lexington, Kentucky; Midwest Regional Final at Houston, Texas; Final Four at Indianapolis, Indiana
- Don Criqui and Gary Thompson – East Regional Final at Philadelphia, Pennsylvania; West Regional Final at Tucson, Arizona
- Bill O'Donnell and Bucky Waters – East Regional semifinals at Philadelphia, Pennsylvania
- Fred White and Larry Conley – Mideast Regional semifinals at Lexington, Kentucky
- Jay Randolph and Jeff Mullins – Midwest Regional semifinals at Houston, Texas
- Dick Enberg and Al McGuire – second round at Lincoln, Nebraska (Louisville–Kansas State, Notre Dame–Missouri); Second Round at Tempe, Arizona (DePaul–UCLA, Ohio State–Arizona State)
- Don Criqui and Billy Packer – second round at West Lafayette, Indiana (St. John's–Purdue, Duke–Pennsylvania); Second Round at Bowling Green, Kentucky (Indiana–Virginia Tech, Kentucky–Florida State)
- Merle Harmon and Joe Dean – second round at Greensboro, North Carolina (North Carolina State–Iowa, Maryland–Tennessee)
- Bob Costas and Bucky Waters – second round at Providence, Rhode Island (Georgetown–Iona, Syracuse–Villanova)
- Charlie Jones and Lynn Shackelford – second round at Ogden, Utah (Brigham Young–Clemson, Oregon State–Lamar)
- Jay Randolph and Gary Thompson – first round at Lincoln, Nebraska (Kansas State–Arkansas, Missouri–San Jose State); Second Round at Denton, Texas (LSU–Alcorn State, North Carolina–Texas A&M)

== See also ==
- 1980 NCAA Division II basketball tournament
- 1980 NCAA Division III basketball tournament
- 1980 National Invitation Tournament
- 1980 NAIA Division I men's basketball tournament
- 1980 National Women's Invitation Tournament
