= 1979–80 NCAA Division I men's basketball rankings =

Men's basketball tournament

- Season: 1979–80
- NCAA Tournament: 1980
- Preseason No. 1: Indiana
- NCAA Tournament Champions: Louisville
NCAA Division I men's basketball rankings


The 1979–80 NCAA Division I men's basketball rankings were made up of two human polls, the AP Poll and the Coaches Poll, in addition to various other preseason polls.

== Legend ==
	Increase in ranking
	Decrease in ranking
	New to rankings from previous week
Italics	Number of first place votes
(#–#)	Win–loss record
т	Tied with team above or below also with this symbol

== AP Poll ==
The final writers' poll was released on Tuesday, March 4.

	Preseason	Week 1 Dec. 3	Week 2 Dec. 10	Week 3 Dec. 17	Week 4 Dec. 24	Week 5 Dec. 31	Week 6 Jan. 7	Week 7 Jan. 14	Week 8 Jan. 21	Week 9 Jan. 28	Week 10 Feb. 4	Week 11 Feb. 11	Week 12 Feb. 18	Week 13 Feb. 25	Final Mar. 3	
1.	Indiana	Indiana (1–0)	Indiana (3–0)	Duke (6–0)	Duke (8–0)	Duke (10–0)	Duke (12–0)	DePaul (12–0)	DePaul (15–0)	DePaul (17–0)	DePaul (19–0) (59)	DePaul (20–0)	DePaul (23–0)	DePaul (25–0)	DePaul (26–1)	1.
2.	Kentucky	Duke (3–0)	Duke (5–0)	Ohio State (5–0)	Kentucky (10–1)	Kentucky (11–1)	DePaul (11–0)	Ohio State (11–1)	Oregon State (17–1)	Oregon State (18–1)	Syracuse (20–1)	Syracuse (21–1)	Louisville (25–2)	Kentucky (26–4)	Louisville (28–3)	2.
3.	Duke	Ohio State (1–0)	Ohio State (3–0)	Kentucky (7–1)	Notre Dame (7–0)	DePaul (8–0)	Ohio State (9–1)	Syracuse (14–0)	Duke (15–2)	Kentucky (17–3)	Louisville (19–2)	Louisville (21–2)	Kentucky (24–4)	Syracuse (24–3)	LSU (24–5)	3.
4.	Ohio State	Notre Dame (1–0)	Notre Dame (4–0)	Notre Dame (6–0)	DePaul (7–0)	LSU (8–0)	Kentucky (12–2)	Oregon State (15–1)	Ohio State (12–2)	Syracuse (17–1)	Oregon State (20–2)	Oregon State (22–2)	Syracuse (22–2)	Louisville (26–3)	Kentucky (28–5)	4.
5.	Notre Dame	Kentucky (3–1)	Kentucky (5–1)	Indiana (4–1)	LSU (6–0)	Ohio State (7–1)	Syracuse (11–0)	Duke (12–2)	Kentucky (15–3)	Duke (16–3)	Kentucky (19–4)	Kentucky (21–4)	LSU (20–4)	LSU (21–5)	Oregon State (26–3)	5.
6.	North Carolina	LSU (1–0)	LSU (3–0)	DePaul (4–0)	North Carolina (5–1)	North Carolina (5–1)	LSU (9–2)	Kentucky (13–3)	Syracuse (15–1)	Ohio State (14–3)	LSU (16–4)	LSU (18–4)	Oregon State (23–3)	Oregon State (24–3)	Syracuse (25–3)	6.
7.	LSU	UCLA (2–0)	UCLA (3–0)	LSU (4–0)	Ohio State (6–1)	Notre Dame (7–1)	Notre Dame (7–1)	Louisville (12–2)	Louisville (13–2)	Louisville (16–2)	Maryland (16–3)	St. John's (21–2)	St. John's (21–3)	Maryland (21–5)	Indiana (20–7)	7.
8.	UCLA	North Carolina (1–1)	North Carolina (3–1)	North Carolina (4–1)	Purdue (6–1)	Purdue (7–1)	Virginia (12–1)	Notre Dame (9–2)	Notre Dame (11–2)	Notre Dame (13–2)	St. John's (19–2)	Maryland (17–4)	North Carolina (19–5)	St. John's (23–3)	Maryland (23–6)	8.
9.	DePaul	St. John's (2–0)	Purdue (4–0)	Purdue (5–0)	Syracuse (6–0)	Syracuse (8–0)	Oregon State (13–1)	North Carolina (8–3)	St. John's (14–1)	St. John's (17–1)	Notre Dame (15–3)	Ohio State (16–5)	Maryland (19–5)	Ohio State (19–6)	Notre Dame (22–5)	9.
10.	Louisville	DePaul (0–0)	Syracuse (4–0)	Syracuse (5–0)	Indiana (5–2)	Iowa (9–0)	Purdue (8–2)	St. John's (11–1)	Missouri (14–2)	LSU (13–4)	Duke (17–4)	Clemson (17–5)	Notre Dame (19–4)	North Carolina (20–6)	Ohio State (20–7)	10.
11.	Purdue	Syracuse (1–0)	DePaul (2–0)	Louisville (5–0)	Iowa (8–0)	Indiana (7–2)	Louisville (10–2)	Purdue (10–3)	LSU (11–4)	North Carolina (12–4)	North Carolina (16–4)	North Carolina (16–5)	Ohio State (17–6)	Missouri (22–4)	Georgetown (24–5)	11.
12.	Syracuse	Purdue (1–0)	Louisville (3–0)	Virginia (5–0)	Louisville (6–1)	Missouri (10–0)	Iowa (10–1)	Virginia (12–2)	Clemson (12–3)	Maryland (14–3)	Purdue (14–5)	Notre Dame (16–4)	Clemson (18–6)	BYU (22–4)	BYU (24–4)	12.
13.	Virginia	Virginia (2–0)	Virginia (4–0)	Iowa (6–0)	Missouri (10–0)	Virginia (9–1)	Missouri (11–1)	Iowa (11–2)	North Carolina (10–4)	Virginia (16–4)	Ohio State (14–5)	BYU (18–4)	Missouri (20–4)	Indiana (18–7)	St. John's (24–4)	13.
14.	Texas A&M	Louisville (1–0)	Oregon State (5–0)	UCLA (3–2)	Virginia (7–1)	Oregon State (11–1)	St. John's (9–1)	LSU (9–3)	Purdue (11–4)	Missouri (15–3)	BYU (17–4)	Missouri (18–4)	BYU (20–4)	Notre Dame (20–5)	Duke (22–8)	14.
15.	BYU	Oregon State (2–0)	St. John's (3–1)	St. John's (5–1)	St. John's (6–1)	Louisville (8–2)	North Carolina (6–3)	Missouri (12–2)	Maryland (13–2)	Weber State (18–1)	Missouri (16–4)	Purdue (15–6)	Purdue (16–7)	Arizona State (20–5)	North Carolina (21–7)	15.
16.	St. John's	Marquette (1–0)	Georgetown (2–0)	Missouri (8–0)	UCLA (5–2)	UCLA (7–2)	UCLA (8–3)	NC State (11–1)	Indiana (11–4)	Clemson (13–4)	Clemson (15–5)	Duke (17–6)	Weber State (23–2)	Weber State (24–2)	Missouri (23–5)	16.
17.	Oregon State	Georgetown (1–0)	Iowa (4–0)	Georgetown (4–1)	Georgetown (7–1)	St. John's (8–1)	BYU (11–3)	Clemson (11–2)	Virginia (13–2)	Purdue (12–5)	Weber State (19–2)	Weber State (21–2)	Duke (18–7)	Clemson (19–7)	Weber State (26–2)	17.
18.	Marquette	BYU (1–1)	BYU (3–1)	BYU (6–1)	Oregon State (8–1)	Georgetown (8–2)	Clemson (10–1)	BYU (12–3)	Weber State (17–1)	Indiana (12–5)	Virginia (16–6)	Arizona State (17–5)	Arizona State (19–5)	Purdue (17–8)	Arizona State (21–6)	18.
19.	Georgetown	Kansas (1–0)	Missouri (6–0)	Oregon State (6–1)	Arkansas (6–1)	BYU (9–3)	Indiana (7–4)	Indiana (9–4)	Tennessee (12–4)	BYU (15–4)	Arizona State (16–4)	Kansas State (18–4)	Indiana (16–7)	NC State (20–6)	Iona (28–4)	19.
20.	Kansas	Iowa (1–0)	Arkansas (4–0)	Arkansas (5–0)	BYU (7–2)	Illinois (10–2)	Georgetown (9–3)	Tennessee (11–3)	BYU (13–4)	Kansas State (15–3)	Indiana (13–6)	Iowa (16–5)	Washington State (19–4)	Georgetown (21–5)	Purdue (18–9)	20.
	Preseason	Week 1 Dec. 3	Week 2 Dec. 10	Week 3 Dec. 17	Week 4 Dec. 24	Week 5 Dec. 31	Week 6 Jan. 7	Week 7 Jan. 14	Week 8 Jan. 21	Week 9 Jan. 28	Week 10 Feb. 4	Week 11 Feb. 11	Week 12 Feb. 18	Week 13 Feb. 25	Final Mar. 3	
		Dropped: Texas A&M	Dropped: Marquette; Kansas	None	None	Dropped: Arkansas	Dropped: Illinois	Dropped: UCLA; Georgetown	Dropped: Iowa (11–4); NC State	Dropped: Tennessee	Dropped: Kansas State (16–4)	Dropped: Virginia; Indiana	Dropped: Kansas State; Iowa (16–7)	Dropped: Duke; Washington State	Dropped: Clemson; NC State	

== UPI Poll ==
The final coaches' poll was released on Tuesday, March 4.

	Preseason	Week 1 Dec. 3	Week 2 Dec. 10	Week 3 Dec. 17	Week 4 Dec. 24	Week 5 Dec. 31	Week 6 Jan. 7	Week 7 Jan. 14	Week 8 Jan. 21	Week 9 Jan. 28	Week 10 Feb. 4	Week 11 Feb. 11	Week 12 Feb. 18	Week 13 Feb. 25	Final Mar. 3	
1.	Indiana	Indiana (1–0)	Indiana (3–0)	Duke (6–0)	Duke (8–0)	Duke (10–0)	Duke (12–0)	DePaul (12–0)	DePaul (15–0)	DePaul (17–0)	DePaul (19–0)	DePaul (20–0)	DePaul (23–0)	DePaul (25–0)	DePaul (26–1) (36)	1.
2.	Ohio State	Duke (3–0)	Duke (5–0)	Ohio State (5–0)	Kentucky (10–1)	Kentucky (11–1)	DePaul (11–0)	Ohio State (11–1)	Oregon State (17–1)	Oregon State (18–1)	Syracuse (20–1)	Syracuse (21–1)	Syracuse (22–2)	Syracuse (24–2)	LSU (24–5)	2.
3.	Notre Dame	Ohio State (1–0)	Ohio State (3–0)	Kentucky (7–1)	Notre Dame (7–0)	DePaul (8–0)	Ohio State (9–1)	Syracuse (14–0)	Duke (15–2)	Syracuse (17–1)	Louisville (19–2)	Louisville (21–2)	Louisville (25–2)	Kentucky (26–4)	Kentucky (28–5) (1)	3.
4.	North Carolina	Notre Dame (1–0)	Notre Dame (4–0)	Indiana (4–1)	North Carolina (5–1)	North Carolina (5–1)	Kentucky (12–2)	Oregon State (15–1)	Ohio State (12–2)	Ohio State (14–3)	Oregon State (20–2)	Oregon State (22–2)	Kentucky (24–4)	Louisville (26–3)	Louisville (28–3) (1)	4.
5.	Kentucky	LSU (1–0)	Kentucky (5–1)	Notre Dame (6–0)	DePaul (7–0)	Ohio State (7–1)	Syracuse (11–0)	Duke (12–2)	Syracuse (15–1)	Louisville (16–2)	Maryland (16–3)	Kentucky (21–4)	Oregon State (23–3)	Oregon State (24–3)	Oregon State (26–3)	5.
6.	Duke	Kentucky (3–1)	UCLA (3–0)	LSU (4–0)	LSU (6–0)	LSU (8–0)	LSU (9–2)	Louisville (12–2)	Louisville (13–2)	Kentucky (17–3)	Kentucky (19–4)	LSU (18–4)	LSU (20–4)	LSU (21–5)	Syracuse (25–3)	6.
7.	UCLA	North Carolina (1–1)	LSU (3–0)	DePaul (4–0) т	Ohio State (6–1)	Purdue (7–1)	Oregon State (13–1)	Notre Dame (9–2)	St. John's (14–1)	Duke (16–3)	LSU (16–4)	Maryland (17–4)	Maryland (19–5)	Maryland (21–5)	Indiana (20–7)	7.
8.	LSU	UCLA (2–0)	North Carolina (3–1)	Purdue (5–0) т	Indiana (5–2)	Notre Dame (7–1)	Notre Dame (7–1)	St. John's (11–1)	Notre Dame (11–2)	St. John's (17–1)	St. John's (19–2)	St. John's (21–2)	North Carolina (19–5)	St. John's (23–3)	Maryland (23–6)	8.
9.	DePaul т	Purdue (1–0)	Purdue (4–0)	North Carolina (4–1)	Purdue (6–1)	Iowa (9–0)	Purdue (8–2)	Kentucky (13–3)	Kentucky (15–3)	Notre Dame (13–2)	Notre Dame (15–3)	Ohio State (16–5)	Missouri (20–4)	North Carolina (20–6) т	Ohio State (20–7)	9.
10.	Virginia т	DePaul (0–0)	DePaul (2–0)	Syracuse (5–0)	Iowa (8–0)	Syracuse (8–0)	Virginia (12–1)	North Carolina (8–3)	Missouri (14–2)	LSU (13–4)	Purdue (14–5)	Missouri (18–4)	Notre Dame (19–4)	Missouri (22–4) т	Georgetown (24–5)	10.
11.	Purdue	St. John's (2–0)	Syracuse (4–0)	Louisville (5–0)	Syracuse (6–0)	Indiana (7–2)	Iowa (10–1)	Purdue (10–3)	LSU (11–4)	North Carolina (12–4)	North Carolina (16–4)	North Carolina (16–5)	St. John's (21–3) т	Ohio State (19–6)	Notre Dame (22–5)	11.
12.	Syracuse	Syracuse (1–0)	Oregon State (5–0)	UCLA (3–2)	Louisville (6–1)	Oregon State (11–1)	Louisville (10–2)	Iowa (11–2)	North Carolina (10–4)	Missouri (15–3)	Duke (17–4)	Purdue (15–6)	Ohio State (17–6) U	Indiana (18–7)	BYU (24–4)	12.
13.	Texas A&M	Virginia (2–0)	Louisville (3–0)	Iowa (6–0)	Georgetown (7–1)	St. John's (8–1)	St. John's (9–1)	Missouri (12–2)	Clemson (12–3)	Maryland (14–3)	Ohio State (14–5)	Notre Dame (16–4)	Indiana (16–7)	BYU (22–4)	St. John's (24–4)	13.
14.	Louisville	Oregon State (2–0)	Iowa (4–0)	Virginia (5–0)	Missouri (10–0)	Missouri (10–0)	Missouri (11–1)	Clemson (11–2)	Maryland (13–2)	Virginia (16–4)	BYU (17–4)	BYU (18–4)	BYU (20–4)	Arizona State (20–5)	Missouri (23–5)	14.
15.	St. John's	Louisville (1–0)	St. John's (3–1)	St. John's (5–1)	UCLA (5–2)	Louisville (8–2)	North Carolina (6–3)	Virginia (12–2)	Purdue (11–4)	Weber State (18–1)	Missouri (16–4)	Weber State (21–2)	Purdue (16–7)	Notre Dame (20–5)	North Carolina (21–7)	15.
16.	Oregon State	Marquette (1–0) т	Georgetown (2–0)	Missouri (8–0)	St. John's (6–1)	UCLA (7–2)	Clemson (10–1)	NC State (11–1)	Indiana (11–4) т	Indiana (12–5)	Arizona State (16–4)	Clemson (17–5)	Weber State (23–2)	Weber State (24–2)	Duke (22–8)	16.
17.	BYU	Georgetown (1–0) т	Virginia (4–0)	Georgetown (4–1)	Oregon State (8–1)	Virginia (9–1)	Indiana (7–4)	LSU (9–3)	Weber State (17–1) т	Clemson (13–4)	Weber State (19–2)	Kansas State (18–4)	Arizona State (19–5)	NC State (20–6)	Weber State (26–2)	17.
18.	Iowa	BYU (1–0) т	BYU (3–1)	BYU (6–1)	Virginia (7–1)	Weber State (11–1)	Tennessee (9–1)	Tennessee (11–3)	Tennessee (12–4)	BYU (15–4)	Indiana (13–6)	Arizona State (17–5)	Clemson (18–6)	Texas A&M (22–7)	Texas A&M (24–7)	18.
19.	Marquette	Kansas (1–0) т	Arkansas (4–0)	Arkansas (5–0)	Arkansas (6–1)	Illinois (10–2)	UCLA (8–3)	Weber State (15–1)	Virginia (13–2)	Kansas State (15–3)	Kansas State (16–4)	Duke (17–6)	Washington State (19–4)	Clemson (19–7)	Arizona State (21–6)	19.
20.	UNLV	Arkansas (1–0)	USC (4–0)	Oregon State (6–1)	BYU (7–2)	Georgetown (8–2)	Weber State (12–1)	BYU (12–3)	Arizona State (12–4)	Purdue (12–5)	Texas A&M (17–5)	NC State (16–5)	NC State (18–6)	Georgetown (21–5) т Iona (25–4) т	Kansas State (21–8)	20.
	Preseason	Week 1 Dec. 3	Week 2 Dec. 10	Week 3 Dec. 17	Week 4 Dec. 24	Week 5 Dec. 31	Week 6 Jan. 7	Week 7 Jan. 14	Week 8 Jan. 21	Week 9 Jan. 28	Week 10 Feb. 4	Week 11 Feb. 11	Week 12 Feb. 18	Week 13 Feb. 25	Final Mar. 3	
		Dropped: Texas A&M; Iowa (1–0); UNLV	Dropped: Marquette; Kansas	Dropped: USC	None	Dropped: Arkansas; BYU (8–3)	Dropped: Illinois; Georgetown	Dropped: Indiana (9–4); UCLA	Dropped: Iowa (11–4); NC State; BYU (13–4)	Dropped: Tennessee; Arizona State	Dropped: Virginia (16–6); Clemson (15–5)	Dropped: Indiana; Texas A&M	Dropped: Kansas State; Duke (18–7)	Dropped: Purdue (17–8); Washington State	Dropped: NC State; Clemson; Iona (28–4)	
