= Iowa Field House =

Stadium in Iowa, United States

Coordinates: 41.6586°N 91.5465°W

- Interactive map of Iowa Field House
- Location: 225 S Grand Ave; Iowa City, Iowa 52240
- Owner: University of Iowa
- Operator: University of Iowa
- Capacity: 13,365 (former); 1,500 (current)

Construction
- Groundbreaking: 1925
- Opened: 1927
- Architects: Proudfoot, Rawson and Souers
- Builders: Arthur H. Neumann & Co.

Tenant
- Iowa Hawkeyes (Table Tennis) (Gymnastics)

The Iowa Field House is a multi-purpose arena in Iowa City, Iowa. Opened in 1927, it held up to 13,365 people at its height. At one time, it housed all Iowa athletic teams and coaching offices before the construction of additional facilities, most notably Carver-Hawkeye Arena. The Field House was a regional site for the NCAA basketball tournament four times, in 1954, 1956, 1964 and 1966. The Iowa Wrestling team hosted the 1959 NCAA Division I Wrestling Championships at the Field House.

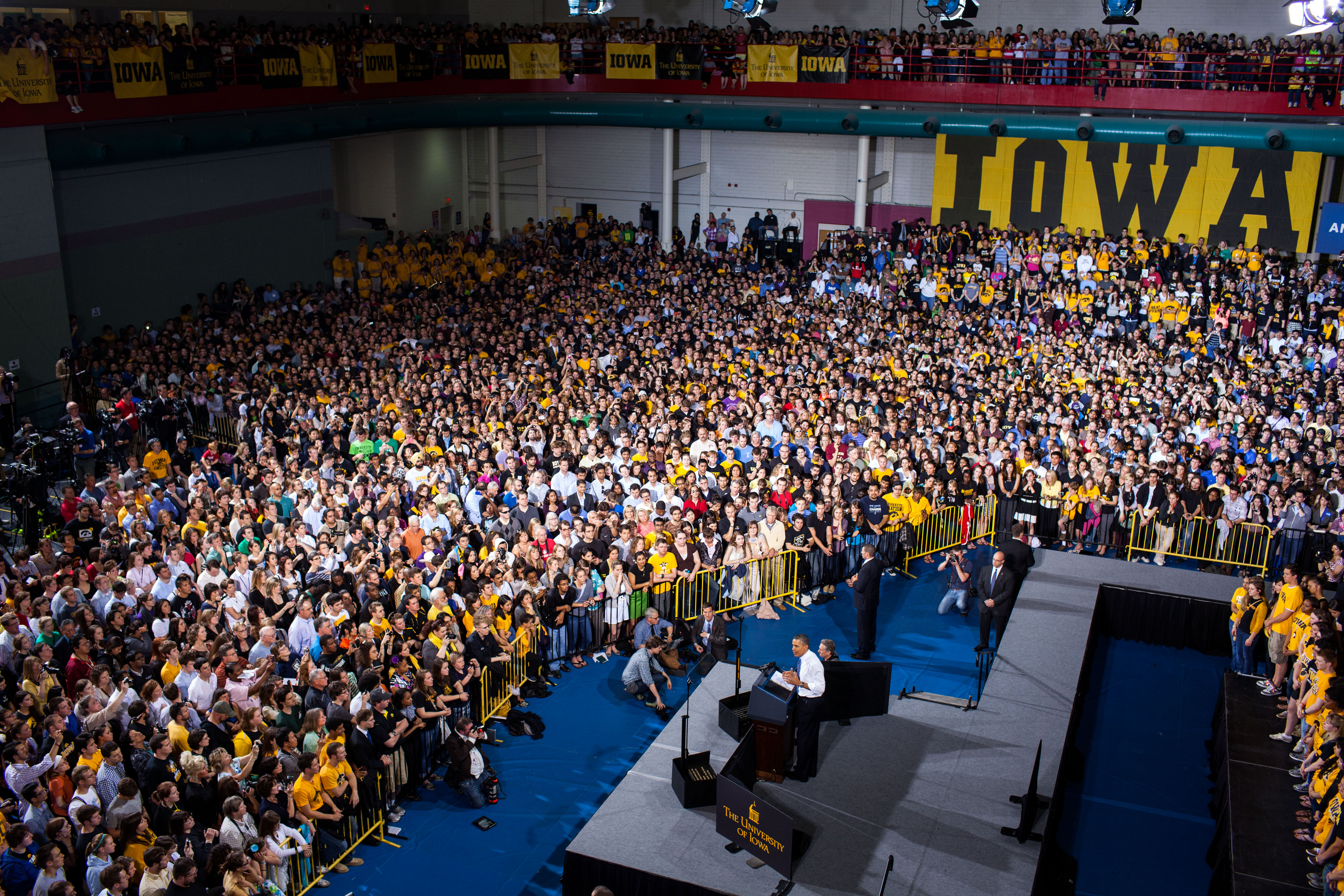
(2012) President Barack Obama at the Iowa Field House.

The pool inside the facility was the home of the Iowa Hawkeyes men's and women's swimming team from its construction through the 2009–2010 season. This field house was believed to be the largest indoor pool in the world at the time of its construction. The building has been host to the University of Iowa Table Tennis Team since 2015.

Since the men's and women's basketball teams' departure in 1982, parts of the arena have been converted into classroom and office space for the university's Health and Human Physiology Department and Recreational Services. The swimming team continued to host events there until the construction of the Campus Recreation and Wellness Center in 2010. The gymnastics team also continue to host events at the Field House.
