= SWAC men's basketball tournament =

SWAC Men's Basketball Tournament
- Conference basketball championship
- Sport: College basketball
- Conference: Southwestern Athletic Conference (SWAC)
- Number of teams: 12
- Format: Single-elimination tournament
- Current stadium: Gateway Center Arena
- Current location: College Park, Georgia
- Played: 1978–present
- Last contest: 2025
- Current champion: Alabama State
- Most championships: Texas Southern (11)
- Official website: SWAC Men's Basketball

The SWAC men's basketball tournament (popularly known as the SWAC tournament) is the conference championship tournament in basketball for the Southwestern Athletic Conference (SWAC). The tournament has been held every year since 1978. It is a single-elimination tournament and seeding is based on regular season records. The winner, declared conference champion, receives the conference's automatic bid to the NCAA Division I men's basketball tournament. On seven occasions, the SWAC champion has won an NCAA Division I tournament game (two being in the first round and five in preliminary rounds).

The 1977–78 season was the SWAC's first as an NCAA Division I basketball conference, but it was not until 1980 that the champion went to the Division I tournament; most notably, the 1979 champion was Alcorn State, who went 27–0 but only received an NIT bid (where they lost in the second round) as they had "not yet completed the three years of adherence to a 2.00 average entrance requirement."

The semifinal and championship SWAC basketball tournament games are held at the Bill Harris Arena in Birmingham, Alabama. As of the 2017 tournaments, they feature an eight-team, three-day layout with the quarterfinal rounds hosted on campus sites. This changes the previous 10-team, five-day tournament format. The higher seeded teams will host a combined eight games leaving two days for travel and practice rounds. The tournament concludes with the semifinals and championship rounds inside Birmingham's Bill Harris Arena. Winners of the tournaments earn automatic bids to their respective NCAA Division I tournaments. The championship games are nationally televised live annually on an ESPN network. In 2017, the trophy was named to honor Davey Whitney, the legendary coach that had won twelve regular season SWAC championships and seven SWAC tournaments, both of which being the most in conference history.

== List of champions (pre-tournament) ==
Season	School	Coach
1956–57	Texas Southern	Edward H. Adams
1957–58	Texas Southern	Edward H. Adams
1958–59	Grambling State	Fred Hobdy
1959–60	Grambling State	Fred Hobdy
1960–61	Prairie View A&M	Leroy Moore Jr
1961–62	Prairie View A&M	Leroy Moore Jr
1962–63	Grambling State	Fred Hobdy
1963–64	Grambling State; Jackson State	Fred Hobdy; Harrison Wilson
1964–65	Southern	Richard Mack
1965–66	Alcorn State; Grambling State	E.E. Simmons; Fred Hobdy
1966–67	Alcorn State; Arkansas–Pine Bluff; Grambling State	Bob Hopkins; Hubert O. Clemmons; Fred Hobdy
1967–68	Alcorn State; Jackson State	Bob Hopkins; Paul Covington
1968–69	Alcorn State	Bob Hopkins
1969–70	Jackson State	Paul Covington
1970–71	Grambling State	Fred Hobdy
1971–72	Grambling State	Fred Hobdy
1972–73	Alcorn State	Davey Whitney
1973–74	Jackson State	Paul Covington
1974–75	Jackson State	Paul Covington
1975–76	Alcorn State	Davey Whitney
1976–77	Texas Southern	Robert Moreland

== List of champions (tournament era) ==
Year	Regular Season Champion	Coach	Tournament Champion	Score	Tournament Runner-up	Tournament Winning Coach
1978	Southern	Carl Stewart	Southern	86-74	Alcorn State	Paul Covington
1979	Alcorn State	Davey Whitney	Alcorn State	108–89	Southern	Davey Whitney
1980	Alcorn State	Davey Whitney	Alcorn State	83–61	Grambling State	Davey Whitney
1981	Alcorn State; Southern	Davey Whitney; Carl Stewart	Southern	69–63	Jackson State	Carl Stewart
1982	Alcorn State; Jackson State	Davey Whitney; Paul Covington	Alcorn State	87–77	Jackson State	Davey Whitney
1983	Texas Southern	Robert Moreland	Alcorn State	81–69	Texas Southern	Davey Whitney
1984	Alcorn State	Davey Whitney	Alcorn State	78–69	Texas Southern	Davey Whitney
1985	Alcorn State	Davey Whitney	Southern	85–70	Alcorn State	Bob Hopkins
1986	Alcorn State; Southern	Davey Whitney; Bob Hopkins	Mississippi Valley State	75–58	Prairie View A&M	Lafayette Stribling
1987	Grambling State	Bob Hopkins	Southern	105–55	Grambling State	Ben Jobe
1988	Southern	Ben Jobe	Southern	78–62	Grambling State	Ben Jobe
1989	Grambling State; Southern; Texas Southern	Bob Hopkins; Ben Jobe; Robert Moreland	Southern	86–81	Texas Southern	Ben Jobe
1990	Southern	Ben Jobe	Texas Southern	94–89	Southern	Robert Moreland
1991	Jackson State	Andy Stoglin	Jackson State	70–66	Texas Southern	Andy Stoglin
1992	Texas Southern; Mississippi Valley State	Robert Moreland; Lafayette Stribling	Mississippi Valley State	85–77	Southern	Lafayette Stribling
1993	Jackson State	Andy Stoglin	Southern	101–80	Jackson State	Ben Jobe
1994	Texas Southern	Robert Moreland	Texas Southern	70–67	Jackson State	Robert Moreland
1995	Texas Southern	Robert Moreland	Texas Southern	75–62	Mississippi Valley State	Robert Moreland
1996	Jackson State; Mississippi Valley State	Andy Stoglin; Lafayette Stribling	Mississippi Valley State	111–94	Jackson State	Lafayette Stribling
1997	Mississippi Valley State	Lafayette Stribling	Jackson State	81–74	Mississippi Valley State	Andy Stoglin
1998	Texas Southern	Robert Moreland	Prairie View A&M	59–57	Texas Southern	Elwood Plummer
1999	Alcorn State	Davey Whitney	Alcorn State	89–83	Southern	Davey Whitney
2000	Alcorn State	Davey Whitney	Jackson State	76–61	Southern	Andy Stoglin
2001	Alabama State	Rob Spivery	Alabama State	64–52	Alcorn State	Rob Spivery
2002	Alcorn State	Davey Whitney	Alcorn State	70–67	Alabama State	Davey Whitney
2003	Prairie View A&M	Jerome Francis	Texas Southern	77–68	Alcorn State	Ronnie Courtney
2004	Mississippi Valley State	Lafayette Stribling	Alabama State	63–58	Alabama A&M	Rob Spivery
2005	Alabama A&M	L. Vann Pettaway	Alabama A&M	72–53	Alabama State	L. Vann Pettaway
2006	Southern	Rob Spivery	Southern	57–44	Arkansas–Pine Bluff	Rob Spivery
2007	Mississippi Valley State	James Green	Jackson State	81–71	Mississippi Valley State	Tevester Anderson
2008	Alabama State	Lewis Jackson	Mississippi Valley State	59–58	Jackson State	James Green
2009	Alabama State	Lewis Jackson	Alabama State	65–58	Jackson State	Lewis Jackson
2010	Arkansas–Pine Bluff	George Ivory	Arkansas–Pine Bluff	50–38	Texas Southern	George Ivory
2011	Texas Southern	Tony Harvey	Alabama State	65–48	Grambling State	Lewis Jackson
2012	Mississippi Valley State	Sean Woods	Mississippi Valley State	71–69	Texas Southern	Sean Woods
2013	Texas Southern (Note: Texas Southern was not eligible for the SWAC tournament due to academic violations.)	Mike Davis	Southern	45–44	Prairie View A&M	Roman Banks
2014	Southern (Note: Southern, alongside Arkansas–Pine Bluff, Grambling and Mississippi Valley State, were not eligible for the SWAC tournament due to bad APR scores, but the schools were allowed to play due to a special waiver as the SWAC had just six eligible schools. If any of the four schools had won the tournament, the "team among the six eligible teams that advances the furthest in the tournament would receive the NCAA tournament bid." As none of the four ineligible schools won the 2014 final, this was rendered moot.)	Roman Banks	Texas Southern	78–73	Prairie View A&M	Mike Davis
2015	Texas Southern	Mike Davis	Texas Southern	62–58	Southern (Note: Southern, while allowed to play in the 2015 tournament, would not have been allowed to play in the NCAA tournament regardless if they won due to sanctions.)	Mike Davis
2016	Texas Southern	Mike Davis	Southern	54–53	Jackson State	Roman Banks
2017	Texas Southern	Mike Davis	Texas Southern	53–50	Alcorn State (Note: Alcorn State, while allowed to play in the 2017 tournament, would not have been allowed to play in the NCAA tournament regardless if they won due to APR penalties; an Alcorn State victory in the tournament final would have meant the regular-season champion, Texas Southern, would receive the NCAA bid.)	Mike Davis
2018	Grambling State (Note: Grambling was ineligible to play in the SWAC tournament for the right to play in the NCAA tournament due to APR violations.)	Donte Jackson	Texas Southern	84–69	Arkansas–Pine Bluff	Mike Davis
2019	Prairie View A&M	Byron Smith	Prairie View A&M	92–86	Texas Southern	Byron Smith
2020	Prairie View A&M	Byron Smith	Canceled due to the coronavirus pandemic			
2021	Prairie View A&M	Byron Smith	Texas Southern	80–61	Prairie View A&M	Johnny Jones
2022	Alcorn State	Landon Bussie	Texas Southern	87–62	Alcorn State	Johnny Jones
2023	Alcorn State	Landon Bussie	Texas Southern	61–58	Grambling State	Johnny Jones
2024	Grambling State	Donte Jackson	Grambling State	75–66	Texas Southern	Donte Jackson
2025	Southern	Kevin Johnson	Alabama State	60–56	Jackson State	Tony Madlock
2026	Bethune–Cookman	Reggie Theus	Prairie View A&M	72–66	Southern	Byron Smith

== Men's basketball tournament performance by school ==
School	Championships	Championship Years
Texas Southern	11	1990, 1994, 1995, 2003, 2014, 2015, 2017, 2018, 2021, 2022, 2023
Southern	10	1978, 1981, 1985, 1987, 1988, 1989, 1993, 2006, 2013, 2016
Alcorn State	7	1979, 1980, 1982, 1983, 1984, 1999, 2002
Alabama State	5	2001, 2004, 2009, 2011, 2025
Jackson State	5	1978, 1991, 1997, 2000, 2007
Mississippi Valley State	5	1986, 1992, 1996, 2008, 2012
Prairie View A&M	3	1998, 2019, 2026
Alabama A&M	1	2005
Arkansas–Pine Bluff	1	2010
Grambling State	1	2024
Bethune–Cookman	0	
Florida A&M	0	

== Coaches with multiple championships ==
=== Regular season ===
Coach	Championships	Championship Years
Davey Whitney	12	1973, 1976, 1979, 1980, 1981, 1982, 1984, 1985, 1986, 1999, 2000, 2002
Fred Hobdy	8	1959, 1960, 1963, 1964, 1966, 1967, 1971, 1972
Robert Moreland	7	1977, 1983, 1989, 1992, 1994, 1995, 1998
Bob Hopkins	6	1967, 1968, 1969, 1986, 1987, 1989
Paul Covington	5	1968, 1970, 1974, 1975, 1982
Lafayette Stribling	4	1992, 1996, 1997, 2004
Mike Davis	4	2013, 2015, 2016, 2017
Ben Jobe	3	1988–1990
Andy Stoglin	3	1991, 1993, 1996
Byron Smith	3	2019, 2020, 2021
Edward H. Adams	2	1957, 1958
Leroy Moore Jr	2	1961, 1962
Rob Spivery	2	2001, 2006
Carl Stewart	2	1978, 1981
Lewis Jackson	2	2008, 2009
Landon Bussie	2	2022, 2023
Donte Jackson	2	2023, 2024

=== SWAC tournament ===
Coach	Championships	Championship Years
Davey Whitney	7	1979, 1980, 1982, 1983, 1984, 1999, 2002
Ben Jobe	4	1987, 1988, 1989, 1993
Mike Davis	4	2014, 2015, 2017, 2018
Johnny Jones	3	2021, 2022, 2023
Lafayette Stribling	3	1986, 1992, 1996
Robert Moreland	3	1990, 1994, 1995
Andy Stoglin	3	1991, 1997, 2000
Rob Spivery	3	2001, 2004, 2006
Roman Banks	2	2013, 2016
Lewis Jackson	2	2009, 2011

== NCAA Tournament appearances ==
Year	SWAC Team	Opponent	Result
1980	(8) Alcorn State	(9) South Alabama (1) LSU	W 70–62; L 88–98
1981	(11) Southern	(6) Wichita State	L 70–95
1982	(11) Alcorn State	(6) Houston	L 84–94
1983	(12) Alcorn State	(12) Xavier (5) Georgetown	W 81–75; L 63–68
1984	(12) Alcorn State	(12) Houston Baptist (5) Kansas	W 79–60; L 56–57
1985	(16) Southern	(1) St. John's	L 59–83
1986	(16) Mississippi Valley State	(1) Duke	L 78–85
1987	(15) Southern	(2) Temple	L 56–75
1988	(15) Southern	(2) Kentucky	L 84–99
1989	(15) Southern	(2) North Carolina	L 79–93
1990	(14) Texas Southern	(3) Georgetown	L 52–70
1991	No appearance, Jackson State lost a play-in against Coastal Carolina		
1992	(16) Mississippi Valley State	(1) Ohio State	L 56–83
1993	(13) Southern	(4) Georgia Tech (12) George Washington	W 93–78; L 80–90
1994	(15) Texas Southern	(2) Duke	L 70–82
1995	(15) Texas Southern	(2) Arkansas	L 78–79
1996	(15) Mississippi Valley State	(2) Georgetown	L 56–93
1997	(16) Jackson State	(1) Kansas	L 64–78
1998	(16) Prairie View A&M	(1) Kansas	L 52–110
1999	(15) Alcorn State	(2) Stanford	L 57–69
2000	(16) Jackson State	(1) Arizona	L 47–71
2001	(16) Alabama State	(1) Michigan State	L 35–69
2002	(16b) Alcorn State	(16a) Siena	L 77–81
2003	(16b) Texas Southern	(16a) UNC Asheville	L 84–92^{OT}
2004	(16) Alabama State	(1) Duke	L 61–96
2005	(16) Alabama A&M	(16) Oakland	L 69–79
2006	(16) Southern	(1) Duke	L 54–70
2007	(16) Jackson State	(1) Florida	L 69–112
2008	(16) Mississippi Valley State	(1) UCLA	L 29–70
2009	(16) Alabama State	(16) Morehead State	L 43–58
2010	(16a) Arkansas–Pine Bluff	(16b) Winthrop (1) Duke	W 61–44; L 44–73
2011	(16) Alabama State	(16) UTSA	L 61–70
2012	(16) Mississippi Valley State	(16) Western Kentucky	L 58–59
2013	(16) Southern	(1) Gonzaga	L 58–64
2014	(16) Texas Southern	(16) Cal Poly	L 69–81
2015	(15) Texas Southern	(2) Arizona	L 72–93
2016	(16) Southern	(16) Holy Cross	L 55–59
2017	(16) Texas Southern	(1) North Carolina	L 64–103
2018	(16) Texas Southern	(16) North Carolina Central	W 64–46; L 83–102
2019	(16) Prairie View A&M	(16) Fairleigh Dickinson	L 76–82
2021	(16) Texas Southern	(16) Mount St. Mary's (1) Michigan	W 60–52; L 66–82
2022	(16) Texas Southern	(16) Texas A&M–Corpus Christi (1) Kansas	W 76–67; L 56–83
2023	(16) Texas Southern	(16) Fairleigh Dickinson	L 61–84
2024	(16) Grambling State	(16) Montana State (1) Purdue	W 88–81^{OT} L 50–78
2025	(16) Alabama State	(16) Saint Francis (1) Auburn	W 70–68; L 63–83
2026	(16) Prairie View A&M	(16) Lehigh (1) Florida	W 67–55; L 55–114

- 2020 NCAA tournament was canceled due to COVID-19.

== See also ==
- SWAC women's basketball tournament
