= 2000–01 Alabama State Hornets basketball team =

American college basketball season

2000–01 Alabama State Hornets basketball
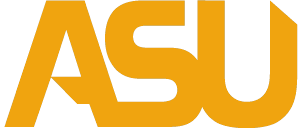

SWAC tournament champions SWAC Regular season champions

NCAA tournament, First round
- Conference: Southwestern Athletic Conference
- Record: 22–9 (15–3 SWAC)
- Head coach: Rob Spivery (5th season)
- Home arena: Dunn–Oliver Acadome

2000–01 SWAC men's basketball standings
	Conf.				Overall
Team	W		L	PCT	W		L	PCT
Alabama State †	15	–	3	.833	22	–	9	.710
Mississippi Valley State	14	–	4	.778	18	–	9	.667
Alabama A&M	13	–	5	.722	17	–	11	.607
Alcorn State	13	–	5	.722	15	–	15	.500
Southern	8	–	10	.444	11	–	16	.407
Grambling State	8	–	10	.444	8	–	18	.308
Jackson State	7	–	11	.389	7	–	23	.233
Texas Southern	5	–	13	.278	7	–	22	.241
Prairie View A&M	5	–	13	.278	6	–	22	.214
Arkansas–Pine Bluff	2	–	16	.111	2	–	25	.074
† 2001 SWAC tournament winner Rankings from AP Poll

The 2000–01 Alabama State Hornets basketball team represented Alabama State University during the 2000–01 NCAA Division I men's basketball season. The Hornets, led by head coach Rob Spivery, played their home games at the Dunn–Oliver Acadome in Montgomery, Alabama as members of the Southwestern Athletic Conference (SWAC). After finishing atop the SWAC regular season standings, the Hornets won the SWAC tournament, earning the conference's automatic bid to play in the NCAA tournament – the first appearance in school history. Playing as No. 16 seed in the South region, Alabama State was beaten by No. 1 seed and eventual Final Four participant, and defending National champion Michigan State in the opening round, to finish the season 22–9 (15–3 SWAC).

== Roster ==
2000–01 Alabama State Hornets men's basketball team
Players	Coaches
Pos. / # / Name / Height / Weight / Year / Previous school / Hometown; F / / Tyrone Levett / 6 ft 5 in (1.96 m) / — / Jr	Head coach: Rob Spivery (Ashland); Assistant coach(es) Legend: (C) Team captain; (S) Suspended; (I) Ineligible; (W) Walk-on; Injured; Current redshirt; Roster

== Schedule and results ==
Date time, TV	Rank^{#}	Opponent^{#}	Result	Record	Site city, state
Non-conference Regular season
Nov 17, 2000*		Birmingham–Southern	W 78–69	1–0	Joe L. Reed Acadome; Montgomery, Alabama
Nov 20, 2000*		at TCU	L 58–104	1–1	Daniel–Meyer Coliseum; Fort Worth, Texas
Nov 25, 2000*		Morris Brown	L 54–56	1–2	Joe L. Reed Acadome; Montgomery, Alabama
Nov 27, 2000*		at Florida A&M	L 85–87	1–3	Jake Gaither Gymnasium; Tallahassee, Florida
Dec 1, 2000*		vs. North Carolina A&T; Minnesota Winter Jam	W 82–61	2–3	Target Center; Minneapolis, Minnesota
Dec 2, 2000*		vs. Coppin State; Minnesota Winter Jam	L 62–63	2–4	Target Center; Minneapolis, Minnesota
Dec 9, 2000*		South Alabama	W 69–61	3–4	Joe L. Reed Acadome; Montgomery, Alabama
SWAC Regular season
Dec 14, 2000		Grambling State	W 78–74	4–4 (1–0)	Joe L. Reed Acadome; Montgomery, Alabama
Dec 16, 2000		Jackson State	W 62–48	5–4 (2–0)	Joe L. Reed Acadome; Montgomery, Alabama
Dec 21, 2000*		at Morris Brown	W 72–57	6–4	John H. Lewis Gymnasium; Atlanta, Georgia
Dec 30, 2000*		at No. 20 Alabama	L 56–82	6–5	Coleman Coliseum; Tuscaloosa, Alabama
Jan 6, 2001		at Arkansas–Pine Bluff	W 69–63	7–5 (3–0)	K. L. Johnson Complex; Pine Bluff, Arkansas
Jan 8, 2001		at Mississippi Valley State	L 70–78	7–6 (3–1)	Harrison HPER Complex; Itta Bena, Mississippi
Jan 13, 2001		at Alabama A&M	W 72–63	8–6 (4–1)	Elmore Gymnasium; Normal, Alabama
Jan 20, 2001		Southern	W 80–59	9–6 (5–1)	Joe L. Reed Acadome; Montgomery, Alabama
Jan 22, 2001		Alcorn State	W 64–52	10–6 (6–1)	Joe L. Reed Acadome; Montgomery, Alabama
Jan 27, 2001		at Prairie View A&M	W 78–64	11–6 (7–1)	William J. Nicks Building; Prairie View, Texas
Jan 29, 2001		at Texas Southern	W 75–57	12–6 (8–1)	Health and Physical Education Arena; Houston, Texas
Feb 3, 2001		Arkansas–Pine Bluff	W 76–52	13–6 (9–1)	Joe L. Reed Acadome; Montgomery, Alabama
Feb 5, 2001		Mississippi Valley State	L 73–81	13–7 (9–2)	Joe L. Reed Acadome; Montgomery, Alabama
Feb 10, 2001		Alabama A&M	W 71–63	14–7 (10–2)	Joe L. Reed Acadome; Montgomery, Alabama
Feb 17, 2001		at Southern	W 62–55	15–7 (11–2)	F. G. Clark Center; Baton Rouge, Louisiana
Feb 19, 2001		at Alcorn State	W 67–50	16–7 (12–2)	Davey Whitney Complex; Lorman, Mississippi
Feb 24, 2001		Prairie View A&M	W 65–56	17–7 (13–2)	Joe L. Reed Acadome; Montgomery, Alabama
Feb 26, 2001		Texas Southern	W 71–52	18–7 (14–2)	Joe L. Reed Acadome; Montgomery, Alabama
Mar 1, 2001		at Jackson State	L 53–70	18–8 (14–3)	Williams Assembly Center; Jackson, Mississippi
Mar 3, 2001		at Grambling State	W 62–54	19–8 (15–3)	Memorial Gymnasium; Grambling, Louisiana
SWAC tournament
Mar 6, 2001*	(1)	(8) Prairie View A&M; Quarterfinals	W 91–72	20–8	Joe L. Reed Acadome; Montgomery, Alabama
Mar 9, 2001*	(1)	vs. (5) Southern; Semifinals	W 81–56	21–8	Bill Harris Arena; Birmingham, Alabama
Mar 10, 2001*	(1)	vs. (3) Alcorn State; Championship game	W 64–52	22–8	Bill Harris Arena; Birmingham, Alabama
NCAA tournament
Mar 16, 2001*; CBS	(16 S)	vs. (1 S) No. 3 Michigan State; First round	L 35–69	22–9	The Pyramid; Memphis, Tennessee
*Non-conference game. ^{#}Rankings from AP Poll. (#) Tournament seedings in parentheses. All times are in Central.
