= 1989–90 Texas Southern Tigers basketball team =

American college basketball season

1989–90 Texas Southern Tigers basketball

SWAC tournament champions

NCAA tournament
- Conference: Southwestern Athletic Conference
- Record: 19–12 (10–4 SWAC)
- Head coach: Robert Moreland (15th season)
- Home arena: Health and Physical Education Arena

1989–90 SWAC men's basketball standings
	Conf.				Overall
Team	W		L	PCT	W		L	PCT
Southern	12	–	2	.857	25	–	6	.806
Texas Southern †	10	–	4	.714	19	–	12	.613
Alabama State	7	–	7	.500	15	–	13	.536
Mississippi Valley State	7	–	7	.500	11	–	18	.379
Alcorn State	6	–	8	.429	7	–	22	.241
Prairie View A&M	5	–	9	.357	9	–	18	.333
Grambling	5	–	9	.357	9	–	19	.321
Jackson State	4	–	10	.286	9	–	19	.321
† 1990 SWAC tournament winner Rankings from AP Poll

The 1989–90 Texas Southern Tigers basketball team represented Texas Southern University during the 1989–90 NCAA Division I men's basketball season. The Tigers, led by 15th-year head coach Robert Moreland, played their home games at the Health and Physical Education Arena and were members of the Southwestern Athletic Conference. Texas Southern compiled an overall record of 19–12, and 10–4 in SWAC play, to finish second during the conference regular season. The Tigers won the SWAC tournament to receive an automatic bid to the NCAA tournament – the first in school history. As No. 14 seed in the Midwest region, the team was defeated by 8th-ranked, No. 3 seed Georgetown in the opening round.

== Roster ==
1989–90 Texas Southern Tigers men's basketball team
Players
Coaches

Pos.	#	Name	Height	Weight	Year	Hometown
G		Darrion Applewhite	6 ft 5 in (1.96 m)	—
G		Keith Armwood	6 ft 0 in (1.83 m)	—
G		Keith Boyd	6 ft 2 in (1.88 m)	—
F		Michael Brooks	6 ft 8 in (2.03 m)	—
F		Raule Collins	6 ft 8 in (2.03 m)	—
G		Tony Gatlin	6 ft 0 in (1.83 m)	—
G		Terry Gee	5 ft 10 in (1.78 m)	—
G		Sean Gibson	6 ft 0 in (1.83 m)	—
C		Charles Parker	6 ft 9 in (2.06 m)	—
F		Charles Price	6 ft 7 in (2.01 m)	—	Sr
G		Chester Smith	6 ft 4 in (1.93 m)	—
G		Chris Tatum	6 ft 1 in (1.85 m)	—
F		Fred West	6 ft 9 in (2.06 m)	—	Sr
G		Ray Younger	6 ft 4 in (1.93 m)	—

Head coach

- Robert Moreland

Assistant coach(es)

Legend

- (C) Team captain
- (S) Suspended
- (I) Ineligible
- (W) Walk-on
- Injured
- Current redshirt

== Schedule and results ==
Date time, TV	Rank^{#}	Opponent^{#}	Result	Record	Site (attendance) city, state
Regular season
Nov 24, 1989*		at Iowa	L 64–80	0–1	Carver-Hawkeye Arena; Iowa City, Iowa
Dec 4, 1989*		at North Texas	W 83–66	1–1	Super Pit; Denton, Texas
Dec 8, 1989*		at Idaho; Palouse Classic	W 78–77	2–1	Cowan Spectrum; Moscow, Idaho
Dec 9, 1989*		vs. Washington State; Palouse Classic	L 75–88	2–2	Cowan Spectrum; Moscow, Idaho
Dec 16, 1989*		at Drake	L 71–78	2–3	Veterans Memorial Auditorium; Des Moines, Iowa
Dec 19, 1989*		at No. 24 Oklahoma State	L 77–79	2–4	Gallagher-Iba Arena; Stillwater, Oklahoma
Dec 22, 1989*		Northern Arizona	W 94–79	3–4	Health & Physical Education Arena; Houston, Texas
Dec 28, 1989*		at New Mexico State	L 76–97	3–5	Pan American Center; Las Cruces, New Mexico
Jan 4, 1990*		at New Orleans	L 59–73	3–6	Lakefront Arena; New Orleans, Louisiana
Jan 13, 1990		at Jackson State	W 87–74	6–6 (1–0)	Williams Assembly Center; Jackson, Mississippi
Jan 15, 1990		at Alabama State	W 116–98	7–6 (2–0)	Dunn–Oliver Acadome; Montgomery, Alabama
Jan 17, 1990*		at Memphis State	L 82–85	7–7	Mid-South Coliseum; Memphis, Tennessee
Jan 20, 1990		Grambling	W 87–69	8–7 (3–0)	Health & Physical Education Arena; Houston, Texas
Jan 22, 1990		Mississippi Valley State	W 95–79	9–7 (4–0)	Health & Physical Education Arena; Houston, Texas
Jan 24, 1990*		at Northern Arizona	W 70–67	10–7	Walkup Skydome; Flagstaff, Arizona
Jan 27, 1990		at Alcorn State	L 66–69	10–8 (4–1)	Davey Whitney Complex; Lorman, Mississippi
Jan 29, 1990		at Southern	L 87–93	10–9 (4–2)	F. G. Clark Center; Baton Rouge, Louisiana
Feb 3, 1990		at Prairie View A&M	W 75–63	11–9 (5–2)	William J. Nicks Building; Prairie View, Texas
Feb 10, 1990		Jackson State	W 77–58	11–9 (6–2)	Health & Physical Education Arena; Houston, Texas
Feb 12, 1990		Alabama State	L 92–98	12–10 (6–3)	Health & Physical Education Arena; Houston, Texas
Feb 17, 1990		at Grambling	W 90–82	13–10 (7–3)	Tiger Memorial Gym; Grambling, Louisiana
Feb 19, 1990		at Mississippi Valley State	L 98–106	13–11 (7–4)	Harrison HPER Complex; Itta Bena, Mississippi
Feb 24, 1990*		Alcorn State	W 91–49	14–11 (8–4)	Health & Physical Education Arena; Houston, Texas
Feb 26, 1990		Southern	W 84–72	15–11 (9–4)	Health & Physical Education Arena; Houston, Texas
Mar 3, 1990		Prairie View A&M	W 109–79	16–11 (10–4)	Health & Physical Education Arena; Houston, Texas
SWAC Tournament
Mar 7, 1990*	(2)	(7) Prairie View A&M; SWAC Tournament Quarterfinal	W 89–60	17–11	Health & Physical Education Arena; Houston, Texas
Mar 8, 1990*	(2)	(3) Mississippi Valley State; SWAC Tournament Semifinal	W 105–75	18–11	Health & Physical Education Arena; Houston, Texas
Mar 9, 1990*	(2)	(1) Southern; SWAC tournament championship	W 94–89	19–11	Health & Physical Education Arena; Houston, Texas
NCAA Tournament
Mar 16, 1990*	(14 MW)	vs. (3 MW) No. 8 Georgetown; First Round	L 52–70	19–12	RCA Dome; Indianapolis, Indiana
*Non-conference game. ^{#}Rankings from AP poll. (#) Tournament seedings in parentheses. MW=Midwest. All times are in Central Time.
