= 1981 MEAC men's basketball tournament =

- Classification: Division I
- Season: 1980–81
- Teams: 6
- Site: Campus sites
- Finals site: Winston-Salem Memorial Coliseum; Winston-Salem, North Carolina
- Winning coach: A. B. Williamson (2nd title)
- MVP: Unknown

1980–81 MEAC men's basketball standings
	Conf.				Overall
Team	W		L	PCT	W		L	PCT
North Carolina A&T	7	–	3	.700	21	–	8	.724
Florida A&M	6	–	4	.600	17	–	11	.607
Howard †	6	–	4	.600	17	–	12	.586
Bethune–Cookman	4	–	6	.400	13	–	15	.464
South Carolina State	4	–	6	.400	11	–	15	.423
Delaware State	3	–	7	.300	8	–	18	.308
† 1981 MEAC tournament winner Rankings from AP Poll

The 1981 Mid-Eastern Athletic Conference men's basketball tournament took place March 5–7 at Winston-Salem Memorial Coliseum in Winston-Salem, North Carolina. Howard defeated North Carolina A&T, 66–63 in the championship game, to win the MEAC Tournament title.

The Bison earned an automatic bid to the 1981 NCAA tournament as a No. 12 seed in the West region.

== Format ==
All six conference members participated, with play beginning in the quarterfinal round. Teams were seeded based on their regular season conference record. This was the final time a third-place consolation game was played.

== Bracket ==
Quarterfinals; March 5
4	Bethune-Cookman	72
5	South Carolina State	60
3	Howard	67
6	Delaware State	53

Semifinals; March 6
1	North Carolina A&T	54
4	Bethune-Cookman	51
3	Howard	75
2	Florida A&M	73

Final; March 7
1	North Carolina A&T	63
3	Howard	66
Third place
4	Bethune-Cookman	72
2	Florida A&M	75

* denotes overtime period
