= 1980–81 Howard Bison men's basketball team =

American college basketball season

1980–81 Howard Bison men's basketball
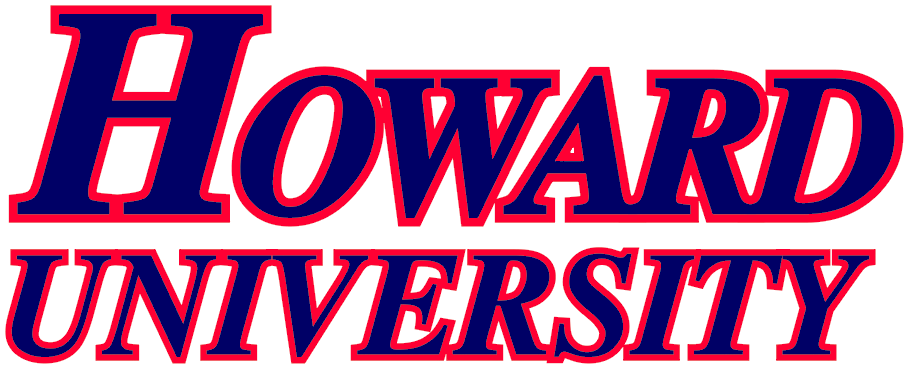

MEAC tournament champions

NCAA tournament, First round
- Conference: Mid-Eastern Athletic Conference
- Record: 17–12 (6–4 MEAC)
- Head coach: A. B. Williamson (5th season)
- Home arena: Burr Gymnasium

1980–81 MEAC men's basketball standings
| | Conf. | | | | Overall |
| Team | W | | L | PCT | W | | L | PCT |
|---|---|---|---|---|---|---|---|---|
| North Carolina A&T | 7 | – | 3 | .700 | 21 | – | 8 | .724 |
| Florida A&M | 6 | – | 4 | .600 | 17 | – | 11 | .607 |
| Howard † | 6 | – | 4 | .600 | 17 | – | 12 | .586 |
| Bethune–Cookman | 4 | – | 6 | .400 | 13 | – | 15 | .464 |
| South Carolina State | 4 | – | 6 | .400 | 11 | – | 15 | .423 |
| Delaware State | 3 | – | 7 | .300 | 8 | – | 18 | .308 |
† 1981 MEAC tournament winner Rankings from AP Poll

The 1980–81 Howard Bison men's basketball team represented Howard University during the 1980–81 NCAA Division I men's basketball season. The Bison, led by fifth-year head coach A. B. Williamson, played their home games at Burr Gymnasium in Washington, D.C., as members of the Mid-Eastern Athletic Conference.

They finished the season 17–12, 6–4 in MEAC play to finish second during the conference regular season. Howard followed by winning the MEAC tournament to earn an automatic bid to the NCAA tournament – the first appearance in program history. As the No. 12 seed in the Midwest Region, the Bison were defeated by No. 5 seed Wyoming in the opening round, 78–43.

== Roster ==
1980–81 Howard Bison men's basketball team
Players
Coaches

| Pos. | # | Name | Height | Weight | Year | Hometown |
|---|---|---|---|---|---|---|---|
| G | | Bernard Perry | 6 ft 5 in (1.96 m) | — | So |
| F | | Larry Spriggs | 6 ft 7 in (2.01 m) | 225 lb (102 kg) | Sr | San Jacinto | Hyattsville, Maryland |
| F | 53 | James Ratiff | 6 ft 9 in (2.06 m) | 210 lb (95 kg) | Jr | Tennessee | Washington, D.C. |

Head coach

- A. B. Williamson

Assistant coach(es)

Legend

- (C) Team captain
- (S) Suspended
- (I) Ineligible
- (W) Walk-on
- Injured
- Current redshirt

Roster

== Schedule and results ==
| Date time, TV | Rank^{#} | Opponent^{#} | Result | Record | Site (attendance) city, state |
Regular season
| Dec 4, 1980* | | at Southern | L 61–69 | 0–1 | F. G. Clark Center; Baton Rouge, Louisiana |
| Dec 6, 1980* | | at Jackson State | L 74–91 | 0–2 | College Park Auditorium; Jackson, Mississippi |
| Dec 8, 1980* | | at Alcorn State | L 68–72 | 0–3 | Davey Whitney Complex; Lorman, Mississippi |
MEAC tournament
| Mar 5, 1981* | (3) | vs. (6) Delaware State; Quarterfinals | W 67–53 | 15–11 | Winston-Salem Memorial Coliseum; Winston-Salem, North Carolina |
| Mar 6, 1981* | (3) | vs. (2) Florida A&M; Semifinals | W 75–73 | 16–11 | Winston-Salem Memorial Coliseum; Winston-Salem, North Carolina |
| Mar 7, 1981* | (3) | vs. (1) North Carolina A&T; Championship game | W 66–63 | 17–11 | Winston-Salem Memorial Coliseum; Winston-Salem, North Carolina |
NCAA tournament
| Mar 12, 1981* | (12 W) | vs. (5 W) No. 17 Wyoming; First round | L 43–78 | 17–12 | Pauley Pavilion (12,045); Los Angeles, California |
*Non-conference game. ^{#}Rankings from AP Poll. (#) Tournament seedings in parentheses. All times are in Central.
