= 2002–03 Texas Southern Tigers basketball team =

American college basketball season

2002–03 Texas Southern Tigers men's basketball
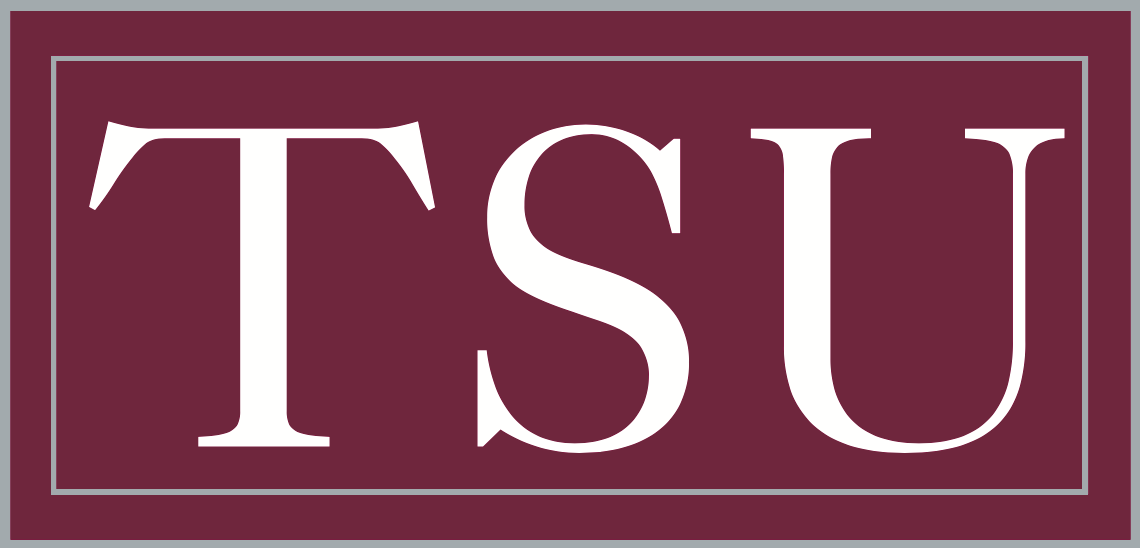

SWAC tournament champions

NCAA tournament, Play-in game
- Conference: Southwestern Athletic Conference
- Record: 18–13 (11–7 SWAC)
- Head coach: Ronnie Courtney (2nd season)
- Home arena: Health and Physical Education Arena

2002–03 SWAC men's basketball standings
	Conf.				Overall
Team	W		L	PCT	W		L	PCT
Prairie View A&M	14	–	4	.778	17	–	12	.586
Mississippi Valley State	13	–	5	.722	15	–	14	.517
Texas Southern †	11	–	7	.611	18	–	13	.581
Alabama State	11	–	7	.611	14	–	15	.483
Alcorn State	10	–	8	.556	14	–	19	.424
Grambling	9	–	9	.500	12	–	18	.400
Jackson State	9	–	9	.500	10	–	18	.357
Southern	5	–	13	.278	9	–	20	.310
Alabama A&M	4	–	14	.222	8	–	19	.296
Arkansas–Pine Bluff	4	–	14	.222	4	–	24	.143
† 2003 SWAC tournament winner Rankings from AP Poll

The 2002–03 Texas Southern Tigers basketball team represented Texas Southern University during the 2002–03 NCAA Division I men's basketball season. The Tigers, led by second year head coach Ronnie Courtney, played their home games at the Health and Physical Education Arena and were members of the Southwestern Athletic Conference. They finished the season 18–13, 11–7 in SWAC play to finish in third place. They were champions of the SWAC tournament to earn an automatic bid to the NCAA tournament where they lost the Play-in game to UNC Asheville.

== Roster ==
2002–03 Texas Southern Tigers men's basketball team
Players
Coaches

Pos.	#	Name	Height	Weight	Year	Hometown
F	13	Lionel Willis	6 ft 5 in (1.96 m)	220 lb (100 kg)	Jr	Houston, Texas
G	15	Allan Lovett	6 ft 4 in (1.93 m)	210 lb (95 kg)	So	Raleigh, North Carolina
G	20	Ra'Kim Hollis	6 ft 2 in (1.88 m)	185 lb (84 kg)	Sr	Tyler, Texas

Head coach

- Ronnie Courtney

Assistant coach(es)

Legend

- (C) Team captain
- (S) Suspended
- (I) Ineligible
- (W) Walk-on
- Injured
- Current redshirt

== Schedule and results ==
Date time, TV	Rank^{#}	Opponent^{#}	Result	Record	Site (attendance) city, state
Regular season
Nov 24, 2002*		at Texas A&M	L 55–70	0–1	Reed Arena; College Station, Texas
Dec 21, 2002*		at Wisconsin	L 58–81	2–3	Kohl Center; Madison, Wisconsin
Mar 8, 2003		Southern	W 79–65	15–12 (11–7)	Health & Physical Education Arena; Houston, Texas
SWAC tournament
Mar 11, 2003*		Jackson State; Quarterfinals	W 68–66	16–12	Health & Physical Education Arena; Houston, Texas
Mar 14, 2003*		vs. Mississippi Valley State; Semifinals	W 73–72	17–12	Bill Harris Arena; Birmingham, Alabama
Mar 15, 2003*		vs. Alcorn State; Championship game	W 77–68	18–12	Bill Harris Arena; Birmingham, Alabama
NCAA tournament
Mar 18, 2003*	(16 S)	vs. (16 S) UNC Asheville; Play-in game	L 84–92 ^{OT}	18–13	University of Dayton Arena; Dayton, Ohio
*Non-conference game. ^{#}Rankings from AP Poll. (#) Tournament seedings in parentheses. S=South region. All times are in Central Time.
