= 1999–2000 Jackson State Tigers basketball team =

American college basketball season

1999–2000 Jackson State Tigers basketball

SWAC tournament champions

NCAA tournament
- Conference: Southwestern Athletic Conference
- Record: 17–16 (10–8 SWAC)
- Head coach: Andy Stoglin (11th season)
- Home arena: Williams Assembly Center

1999–2000 SWAC men's basketball standings
	Conf.				Overall
Team	W		L	PCT	W		L	PCT
Alcorn State	15	–	3	.833	19	–	10	.655
Alabama A&M	14	–	4	.778	18	–	10	.643
Southern	14	–	4	.778	18	–	11	.621
Texas Southern	10	–	8	.556	15	–	14	.517
Jackson State †	10	–	8	.556	17	–	16	.515
Alabama State	10	–	8	.556	13	–	15	.464
Mississippi Valley State	7	–	11	.389	6	–	21	.222
Prairie View A&M	5	–	13	.278	7	–	20	.259
Arkansas–Pine Bluff	5	–	13	.278	6	–	21	.222
Grambling State	0	–	18	.000	1	–	30	.032
† 2000 SWAC tournament winner Rankings from AP Poll

The 1999–2000 Jackson State Tigers basketball team represented Jackson State University in the 1999–2000 NCAA Division I men's basketball season. The Tigers, led by 11th-year head coach Andy Stoglin, played their home games at the Williams Assembly Center in Jackson, Mississippi as members of the Southwestern Athletic Conference. After finishing the conference regular season tied for fourth in the standings, Jackson State won the SWAC tournament to receive an automatic bid to the NCAA tournament. As No. 16 seed in the West region, the Tigers were beaten by No. 1 seed Arizona in the opening round.

== Roster ==
1999–2000 Jackson State Tigers men's basketball team
Players	Coaches
Pos. / # / Name / Height / Weight / Year / Hometown; C / / Vincent Jones / 6 ft 11 in (2.11 m) / — / Sr	Head coach: Andy Stoglin; Assistant coach(es) Legend: (C) Team captain; (S) Suspended; (I) Ineligible; (W) Walk-on; Injured; Current redshirt; Roster

== Schedule and results ==
Date time, TV	Rank^{#}	Opponent^{#}	Result	Record	Site (attendance) city, state
Non-conference regular season
Nov 19, 1999*		vs. Bowling Green State	L 43–60	0–1	Stan Sheriff Center; Honolulu, Hawaii
Nov 21, 1999*		at Tennessee-Martin	W 63–48	1–1	Skyhawk Arena; Martin, Tennessee
Nov 25, 1999*		at UTEP	L 58–74	1–2	Don Haskins Center; El Paso, Texas
Nov 29, 1999*		at Arkansas State	W 85–80 ^{OT}	2–2	Convocation Center; Jonesboro, Arkansas
Dec 1, 1999*		at Memphis	L 74–79	2–3	Pyramid Arena; Memphis, Tennessee
Dec 4, 1999*		at Arkansas	L 60–98	2–4	Bud Walton Arena; Fayetteville, Arkansas
Dec 6, 1999*		Arkansas State	L 68–79	2–5	Williams Assembly Center; Jackson, Mississippi
Dec 8, 1999*		Louisiana Tech	W 72–69	3–5	Williams Assembly Center; Jackson, Mississippi
SWAC regular season
Dec 10, 1999		vs. Alabama A&M	L 41–63	3–6 (0–1)	Bartow Arena; Birmingham, Alabama
Dec 18, 1999*		Alabama State	W 75–69 ^{OT}	4–6 (1–1)	Williams Assembly Center; Jackson, Mississippi
Dec 20, 1999*		Tougaloo	W 76–62	5–6	Williams Assembly Center; Jackson, Mississippi
Dec 22, 1999*		at McNeese State	L 59–68	5–7	Burton Coliseum; Lake Charles, Louisiana
Dec 27, 1999*		at Southern Miss	L 65–73	5–8	Reed Green Coliseum; Hattiesburg, Mississippi
Jan 3, 2000		at Southern	L 56–65	5–9 (1–2)	F. G. Clark Center; Baton Rouge, Louisiana
Jan 5, 2000		at Alcorn State	L 63–72	5–10 (1–3)	Davey Whitney Complex; Lorman, Mississippi
Jan 8, 2000		Texas Southern	L 79–85	5–11 (1–4)	Williams Assembly Center; Jackson, Mississippi
Jan 10, 2000		Prairie View	W 75–60	6–11 (2–4)	Williams Assembly Center; Jackson, Mississippi
Jan 15, 2000		Grambling	W 82–62	7–11 (3–4)	Williams Assembly Center; Jackson, Mississippi
Jan 22, 2000		at Mississippi Valley State	L 61–74	7–12 (3–5)	Harrison HPER Complex; Itta Bena, Mississippi
Jan 24, 2000		at Arkansas-Pine Bluff	W 62–61	8–12 (4–5)	K.L. Johnson Complex; Pine Bluff, Arkansas
Jan 29, 2000		Alcorn State	W 73–72	9–12 (5–5)	Williams Assembly Center; Jackson, Mississippi
Jan 31, 2000		Southern	L 72–79	9–13 (5–6)	Williams Assembly Center; Jackson, Mississippi
Feb 5, 2000		at Texas Southern	W 66–56	10–13 (6–6)	Health and Physical Education Arena; Houston, Texas
Feb 7, 2000		at Prairie View	W 77–67	11–13 (7–6)	William J. Nicks Building; Prairie View, Texas
Feb 12, 2000		at Grambling	W 60–58	12–13 (8–6)	Memorial Gymnasium; Grambling, Louisiana
Feb 19, 2000		Mississippi Valley State	W 91–73	13–13 (9–6)	Williams Assembly Center; Jackson, Mississippi
Feb 21, 2000		Arkansas-Pine Bluff	W 76–64	14–13 (10–6)	Williams Assembly Center; Jackson, Mississippi
Feb 26, 2000		at Alabama A&M	L 60–63	14–14 (10–7)	Elmore Gymnasium; Huntsville, Alabama
Feb 28, 2000		at Alabama State	L 72–76	14–15 (10–8)	ASU Acadome; Montgomery, Alabama
SWAC tournament
Mar 9, 2000*		vs. Alabama State; Quarterfinals	W 56–50	15–15	Mississippi Coast Coliseum; Biloxi, Mississippi
Mar 10, 2000*		vs. Alcorn State; Semifinals	W 64–60	16–15	Mississippi Coast Coliseum; Biloxi, Mississippi
Mar 11, 2000*		vs. Southern; Championship game	W 76–61	17–15	Mississippi Coast Coliseum; Biloxi, Mississippi
NCAA tournament
Mar 16, 2000*	(16 W)	vs. (1 W) No. 4 Arizona; First Round	L 47–71	17–16	Jon M. Huntsman Center; Salt Lake City, Utah
*Non-conference game. ^{#}Rankings from AP Poll. (#) Tournament seedings in parentheses. All times are in Central.
