= 2003 SWAC men's basketball tournament =

Basketball Tournament March 2001 in Alabama

- Classification: Division I
- Season: 2002–03
- Teams: 8
- Quarterfinals site: Campus sites
- Semifinals site: Bill Harris Arena; Birmingham, Alabama
- Finals site: Bill Harris Arena; Birmingham, Alabama
- Champions: Texas Southern (4th title)
- Winning coach: Ronnie Courtney (1st title)

2002–03 SWAC men's basketball standings
	Conf.				Overall
Team	W		L	PCT	W		L	PCT
Prairie View A&M	14	–	4	.778	17	–	12	.586
Mississippi Valley State	13	–	5	.722	15	–	14	.517
Texas Southern †	11	–	7	.611	18	–	13	.581
Alabama State	11	–	7	.611	14	–	15	.483
Alcorn State	10	–	8	.556	14	–	19	.424
Grambling	9	–	9	.500	12	–	18	.400
Jackson State	9	–	9	.500	10	–	18	.357
Southern	5	–	13	.278	9	–	20	.310
Alabama A&M	4	–	14	.222	8	–	19	.296
Arkansas–Pine Bluff	4	–	14	.222	4	–	24	.143
† 2003 SWAC tournament winner Rankings from AP Poll

The 2003 SWAC men's basketball tournament was held March 11–15, 2003, at Bill Harris Arena in Birmingham, Alabama. Texas Southern defeated Alcorn State, 77–68 in the championship game. The Tigers received the conference's automatic bid to the 2003 NCAA tournament as one of two No. 16 seeds in the South Region. In the play-in game, Alcorn State was beaten by UNC Asheville.

== Bracket and results ==
Quarterfinals; March 11
1	Prairie View A&M	56
8	Southern	55
4	Alabama State	55
5	Alcorn State	58
3	Texas Southern	68
6	Jackson State	66
2	Mississippi Valley State	90
7	Grambling State	78

Semifinals; March 14
1	Prairie View A&M	64
5	Alcorn State	71
3	Texas Southern	73
2	Mississippi Valley State	72

Final; March 15
5	Alcorn State	68
3	Texas Southern	77
