= 1994–95 Texas Southern Tigers basketball team =

American college basketball season

1994–95 Texas Southern Tigers men's basketball

SWAC tournament champions

NCAA tournament
- Conference: Southwestern Athletic Conference
- Record: 22–7 (12–2 SWAC)
- Head coach: Robert Moreland (20th season)
- Home arena: Health and Physical Education Arena

1994–95 SWAC men's basketball standings
	Conf.				Overall
Team	W		L	PCT	W		L	PCT
Texas Southern †	12	–	2	.857	22	–	7	.759
Mississippi Valley State	10	–	4	.714	17	–	11	.607
Alabama State	8	–	6	.571	11	–	15	.423
Southern	7	–	7	.500	13	–	13	.500
Jackson State	7	–	7	.500	12	–	19	.387
Grambling State	5	–	9	.357	11	–	17	.393
Alcorn State	4	–	10	.286	7	–	19	.269
Prairie View A&M	3	–	11	.214	6	–	21	.222
† 1995 SWAC tournament winner Rankings from AP Poll

The 1994–95 Texas Southern Tigers basketball team represented Texas Southern University during the 1994–95 NCAA Division I men's basketball season. The Tigers, led by 20th-year head coach Robert Moreland, played their home games at the Health and Physical Education Arena and were members of the Southwestern Athletic Conference. Texas Southern compiled an overall record of 22–7 (later adjusted to 23–6), and 12–2 in SWAC play, to finish first during the conference regular season. The Tigers also won the SWAC tournament to receive an automatic bid to the NCAA tournament for the second consecutive season. As No. 15 seed in the Midwest region, the team was defeated by 6th-ranked, No. 2 seed, and eventual National runner-up Arkansas, 79–78, in the opening round.

== Roster ==
1994–95 Texas Southern Tigers men's basketball team
Players	Coaches
Pos. / # / Name / Height / Weight / Year / Hometown; G / / Kevin Granger / 6 ft 3 in (1.91 m) / — / Jr	Head coach: Robert Moreland; Assistant coach(es) Legend: (C) Team captain; (S) Suspended; (I) Ineligible; (W) Walk-on; Injured; Current redshirt

== Schedule and results ==
Date time, TV	Rank^{#}	Opponent^{#}	Result	Record	Site (attendance) city, state
Regular season
Nov 26, 1994*		at California	L 69–82	0–1	Harmon Gym; Berkeley, California
Dec 2, 1994*		at Montana	L 58–64	3–2	Dahlberg Arena; Missoula, Montana
Dec 3, 1994*		vs. Colgate	W 91–87 ^{OT}	4–2	Dahlberg Arena; Missoula, Montana
Dec 21, 1994*		at No. 16 Minnesota	W 71–50	7–2	Williams Arena; Minneapolis, Minnesota
SWAC Tournament
NCAA Tournament
Mar 17, 1995*	(15 MW)	vs. (2 MW) No. 6 Arkansas; First round	L 78–79	22–7	Frank Erwin Center; Austin, Texas
*Non-conference game. ^{#}Rankings from AP poll. (#) Tournament seedings in parentheses. MW=Midwest. All times are in Central Time.
