= Ben Jobe =

American basketball coach

Biographical details
- Born: March 2, 1933
- Died: March 10, 2017 (aged 84); Montgomery, Alabama, U.S.

Playing career
- c. 1955: Fisk

Coaching career (HC unless noted)
- 1958–1959: Cameron HS
- 1964–1967: Talladega
- 1967–1968: Alabama State
- 1968–1973: South Carolina State
- 1973–1978: South Carolina (assistant)
- 1978–1980: Denver
- 1980–1981: Denver Nuggets (assistant)
- 1981–1982: Georgia Tech (assistant)
- 1982–1986: Alabama A&M
- 1986–1996: Southern
- 1996–2000: Tuskegee
- 2001–2003: Southern

Head coaching record
- Overall: 524–334 (college)
- Tournaments: 1–4 (NCAA Division I); 0–1 (NIT); 0–4 (NCAA Division II); 0–1 (NAIA)

Accomplishments and honors

Championships
- 3 SIAC regular season (1983, 1985, 1986); SIAC tournament (1986); 3 SWAC regular season (1988–1990); 4 SWAC tournament (1987–1989, 1993)

Ben W. Jobe (March 2, 1933 – March 10, 2017) was an American basketball coach. He was best known as the head coach of the Southern University Jaguars – a position he held for 12 years. He has also been head coach of the men's college basketball teams at Tuskegee University, Talladega College, Alabama State University, South Carolina State University, University of Denver and Alabama A&M University. Jobe has also served as assistant coach at the University of South Carolina, Georgia Tech, and briefly served as an assistant with the NBA's Denver Nuggets.

== Early career ==
Ben Jobe was raised in Nashville, Tennessee. He attended Pearl High School in Nashville where he was a successful basketball player. In 1950, Jobe earned all-district and all-state honors and was then named to the 1951 all-national high school team.

Jobe then enrolled at Fisk University, earning All-Southern Intercollegiate Athletic Conference honors during his junior and senior seasons. He earned a bachelor's degree from Fisk in 1956 and later went on to earn a master's degree from Tennessee State University. In 1958, Jobe began his coaching career at Cameron High School in Nashville, Tennessee. His first (and only) Cameron team won 24 games, a school record. After the season was over, Jobe decided to move to Sierra Leone, West Africa, to coach a junior college basketball team. Jobe's coaching had a quick effect: his teams posted back-to-back undefeated seasons.

Jobe returned to the United States and began coaching at Talladega College in Alabama, a position which he held for three years.

== Coach of Southern University Jaguars ==
Ben Jobe took the helm of the Southern University Jaguars in 1986. He stayed on until 1996. He returned again to Southern in 2001 for two more seasons, retiring completely from college basketball in 2003. In 12 years at Southern, Jobe compiled a 209–141 record, led the Jaguars to the NCAA tournament four times, went to the National Invitational Tournament (NIT) once, won five Southern Intercollegiate Athletic Conference Championships, won 11 Southwestern Athletic Conference Championships.

Perhaps his most memorable moment as a college basketball coach was the Jaguars' 93–78 win over the then ACC Champions, Georgia Tech Yellow Jackets, during the first round of the 1993 NCAA tournament in Tucson, Arizona.

Jobe coached former San Antonio Spurs star guard (former coach of the Brooklyn Nets and Dallas Mavericks) Avery Johnson and late Charlotte Hornets player Bobby Phills.

Upon his retirement from Southern in 2003, Jobe had accumulated 524 wins as a head coach in college basketball spread among 8 teams over 31 seasons (a 0.611 win percentage).

== Family and death ==
Jobe and his wife, Regina, had two children, Bryan and Gina.

Jobe died on March 10, 2017, with his funeral held at Resurrection Church in Montgomery, Alabama.

== Head coaching record ==
Record table
Season	Team	Overall	Conference	Standing	Postseason
Talladega Tornadoes (NAIA independent) (1964–1967)
1964–65	Talladega	14–8			
1965–66	Talladega	17–6			
1966–67	Talladega	14–7			
Talladega:		45–21			
Alabama State Hornets (Southern Intercollegiate Athletic Conference) (1967–1968)
1967–68	Alabama State	18–7	7–5	T–6th	
Alabama State:		18–7	7–5		
South Carolina State Bulldogs (Southern Intercollegiate Athletic Conference) (1968–1971)
1968–69	South Carolina State	20–5	14–3		
1969–70	South Carolina State	21–7	11–4		NAIA First Round
1970–71	South Carolina State	20–7	12–9		
South Carolina State Bulldogs (Mid-Eastern Athletic Conference) (1971–1973)
1971–72	South Carolina State	15–11	6–6	5th	
1972–73	South Carolina State	17–14	3–9	T–5th	
South Carolina State:		93–44	46–31		
Denver Pioneers (NCAA Division I independent) (1978–1980)
1978–79	Denver	15–12			
1979–80	Denver	18–9			
Denver:		33–21			
Alabama A&M Bulldogs (Southern Intercollegiate Athletic Conference) (1982–1986)
1982–83	Alabama A&M	18–9	12–4	1st	
1983–84	Alabama A&M	21–8	9–3	2nd	
1984–85	Alabama A&M	21–10	11–5	T–1st	NCAA Division II Regional Fourth Place
1985–86	Alabama A&M	23–9	12–4	1st	NCAA Division II Regional Fourth Place
Alabama A&M:		83–36	44–16		
Southern Jaguars (Southwestern Athletic Conference) (1986–1996)
1986–87	Southern	19–12	9–5	T–2nd	NCAA Division I First Round
1987–88	Southern	24–7	12–2	1st	NCAA Division I First Round
1988–89	Southern	20–11	10–4	T–1st	NCAA Division I First Round
1989–90	Southern	25–6	12–2	1st	NIT First Round
1990–91	Southern	19–9	8–4	2nd	
1991–92	Southern	18–12	9–5	3rd	
1992–93	Southern	21–10	9–5	T–2nd	NCAA Division I Second Round
1993–94	Southern	16–11	8–6	4th	
1994–95	Southern	13–13	7–7	T–4th	
1995–96	Southern	17–11	8–5	3rd	
Tuskegee Golden Tigers (Southern Intercollegiate Athletic Conference) (1996–2000)
1996–97	Tuskegee	7–20	2–14	6th (West)	
1997–98	Tuskegee	8–19	4–10	4th (West)	
1998–99	Tuskegee	15–13	9–7	3rd (West)	
1999–00	Tuskegee	7–17	5–12	9th	
Tuskegee:		37–69	20–43		
Southern Jaguars (Southwestern Athletic Conference) (2001–2003)
2001–02	Southern	7–20	6–12	9th	
2002–03	Southern	9–20	5–13	8th	
Southern:		208–142	103–70		
Total:		524–334			
National champion Postseason invitational champion Conference regular season champion Conference regular season and conference tournament champion Division regular season champion Division regular season and conference tournament champion Conference tournament champion
