= 1998 SWAC men's basketball tournament =

- Classification: Division I
- Season: 1997–98
- Teams: 8
- Site: Reunion Arena; Dallas, Texas
- Champions: Prairie View A&M (1st title)
- Winning coach: Elwood Plummer (1st title)

1997–98 SWAC men's basketball standings
	Conf.				Overall
Team	W		L	PCT	W		L	PCT
Texas Southern	12	–	4	.750	15	–	16	.484
Jackson State	11	–	5	.688	14	–	13	.519
Grambling	10	–	6	.625	16	–	12	.571
Southern	10	–	6	.625	14	–	13	.519
Alcorn State	8	–	8	.500	12	–	15	.444
Prairie View A&M †	6	–	10	.375	13	–	17	.433
Alabama State	6	–	10	.375	11	–	17	.393
Mississippi Valley State	6	–	10	.375	6	–	21	.222
Arkansas–Pine Bluff	3	–	13	.188	4	–	23	.148
† 1998 SWAC tournament winner Rankings from AP Poll

The 1998 SWAC men's basketball tournament was held March 5–7, 1998, at the Reunion Arena in Dallas, Texas. Prairie View A&M defeated Texas Southern, 59–57 in the championship game to win the school's first SWAC Tournament title. The Panthers received the conference's automatic bid to the 1998 NCAA tournament as No. 16 seed in the Midwest Region.

== Bracket and results ==
Quarterfinals; March 5
1	Texas Southern	72
8	Mississippi Valley State	57
4	Grambling State	74
5	Alcorn State	73
3	Southern	59
6	Alabama State	82
2	Jackson State	58
7	Prairie View A&M	60

Semifinals; March 6
1	Texas Southern	48
4	Grambling State	45
6	Alabama State	61
7	Prairie View A&M	65

Final; March 7
1	Texas Southern	57
7	Prairie View A&M	59
