= 1993–94 Texas Southern Tigers basketball team =

American college basketball season

1993–94 Texas Southern Tigers men's basketball

SWAC tournament champions

NCAA tournament
- Conference: Southwestern Athletic Conference
- Record: 19–11 (12–2 SWAC)
- Head coach: Robert Moreland (19th season)
- Home arena: Health and Physical Education Arena

1993–94 SWAC men's basketball standings
	Conf.				Overall
Team	W		L	PCT	W		L	PCT
Texas Southern †	12	–	2	.857	19	–	11	.633
Jackson State	11	–	3	.786	19	–	10	.655
Alabama State	10	–	4	.714	19	–	10	.655
Southern	8	–	6	.571	16	–	11	.593
Mississippi Valley State	6	–	8	.429	10	–	17	.370
Grambling State	4	–	10	.286	9	–	18	.333
Alcorn State	3	–	11	.214	3	–	24	.111
Prairie View A&M	2	–	12	.143	5	–	22	.185
† 1994 SWAC tournament winner Rankings from AP Poll

The 1993–94 Texas Southern Tigers basketball team represented Texas Southern University during the 1993–94 NCAA Division I men's basketball season. The Tigers, led by 19th-year head coach Robert Moreland, played their home games at the Health and Physical Education Arena and were members of the Southwestern Athletic Conference. Texas Southern compiled an overall record of 19–11, and 12–2 in SWAC play, to finish first during the conference regular season. The Tigers also won the SWAC tournament to receive an automatic bid to the NCAA tournament. As No. 15 seed in the Southeast region, the team was defeated by 6th-ranked, No. 2 seed, and eventual National runner-up Duke, 82–70, in the opening round.

== Roster ==
1989–90 Texas Southern Tigers men's basketball team
Players
Coaches

Pos.	#	Name	Height	Weight	Year	Hometown
G		Theon Dotson	6 ft 2 in (1.88 m)	—	Sr
G		Kevin Granger	6 ft 3 in (1.91 m)	—	So

Head coach

- Robert Moreland

Assistant coach(es)

Legend

- (C) Team captain
- (S) Suspended
- (I) Ineligible
- (W) Walk-on
- Injured
- Current redshirt

== Schedule and results ==
Date time, TV	Rank^{#}	Opponent^{#}	Result	Record	Site (attendance) city, state
Regular season
SWAC Tournament
Mar 11, 1994*		vs. Prairie View; Quarterfinals	W 119–70	17–10	Baton Rouge River Center; Baton Rouge, Louisiana
Mar 12, 1994*		vs. Southern; Semifinals	W 106–84	18–10	Baton Rouge River Center; Baton Rouge, Louisiana
Mar 13, 1994*		vs. Jackson State; Championship game	W 70–67	19–10	Baton Rouge River Center; Baton Rouge, Louisiana
NCAA Tournament
Mar 18, 1994*	(15 SE)	vs. (2 SE) No. 6 Duke; First round	L 70–82	19–11	Tropicana Field; St. Petersburg, Florida
*Non-conference game. ^{#}Rankings from AP poll. (#) Tournament seedings in parentheses. SE=Southeast. All times are in Central Time.
