= 1980–81 Wyoming Cowboys basketball team =

American college basketball season

1980–81 Wyoming Cowboys basketball

WAC co-champions

NCAA tournament, Second round
- Conference: Western Athletic Conference

Ranking
- Coaches: No. 16
- AP: No. 17
- Record: 24–6 (13–3 WAC)
- Head coach: Jim Brandenburg (2nd season)
- Home arena: War Memorial Fieldhouse

1980–81 WAC men's basketball standings
	Conf.				Overall
Team	W		L	PCT	W		L	PCT
No. 14 Utah	13	–	3	.813	25	–	5	.833
No. 17 Wyoming	13	–	3	.813	24	–	6	.800
No. 16 BYU	12	–	4	.750	25	–	7	.781
UTEP	9	–	7	.563	18	–	12	.600
San Diego State	8	–	8	.500	15	–	12	.556
Hawaii	7	–	9	.438	14	–	13	.519
New Mexico	6	–	10	.375	11	–	15	.423
Air Force	3	–	13	.188	9	–	18	.333
Colorado State	1	–	15	.063	3	–	24	.111
Rankings from AP Poll

The 1980–81 Wyoming Cowboys basketball team represented the University of Wyoming as a member of the Western Athletic Conference during the 1980–81 NCAA Division I men's basketball season. The Cowboys, led by second-year head coach Jim Brandenburg, played their home games at War Memorial Fieldhouse in Laramie, Wyoming.

== Roster ==
1980–81 Wyoming Cowboys men's basketball team
Players
Coaches

Pos.	#	Name	Height	Weight	Year	Previous school	Hometown
G		Charles Bradley	6 ft 5 in (1.96 m)	210 lb (95 kg)	Sr	Edgewood	Edgewood, Maryland
F		Bill Garnett	6 ft 9 in (2.06 m)	220 lb (100 kg)	Jr	Regis Jesuit	Denver, Colorado
C		Chris Engler	6 ft 11 in (2.11 m)	240 lb (109 kg)	Jr	Minnesota	Oak Park Heights, Minnesota

Head coach

- Jim Brandenburg (Colorado State)

Assistant coach(es)

Legend

- (C) Team captain
- (S) Suspended
- (I) Ineligible
- (W) Walk-on
- Injured
- Current redshirt

== Schedule and results ==
Date time, TV	Rank^{#}	Opponent^{#}	Result	Record	Site city, state
Regular Season
Nov 28, 1980*		at Nebraska	W 62–59 ^{OT}	1–0	Bob Devaney Sports Center (7,800); Lincoln, Nebraska
Dec 2, 1980*		Midwestern State	W 87–61	2–0	War Memorial Fieldhouse (4,389); Laramie, Wyoming
Dec 4, 1980*		Stanford	W 73–51	3–0	War Memorial Fieldhouse (5,079); Laramie, Wyoming
Dec 6, 1980*		Adams State	W 101–67	4–0	War Memorial Fieldhouse (7,042); Laramie, Wyoming
Dec 11, 1980*		at Boise State	W 76–51	5–0	Bronco Gym (2,076); Boise, Idaho
Dec 13, 1980*		at USC	L 57–59	5–1	L.A. Sports Arena (3,270); Los Angeles, California
Dec 16, 1980*		Western Montana	W 79–45	6–1	War Memorial Fieldhouse (4,713); Laramie, Wyoming
Dec 19, 1980*		vs. Oklahoma	W 98–77	7–1	Astrodome (3,800); Houston, Texas
Dec 20, 1980*		at Houston	L 61–70	7–2	Astrodome (5,300); Houston, Texas
Dec 29, 1980*		Illinois–Chicago	W 99–47	8–2	War Memorial Fieldhouse (4,419); Laramie, Wyoming
Jan 2, 1981		at San Diego State	W 69–51	9–2 (1–0)	San Diego Sports Arena (3,247); San Diego, California
Jan 5, 1981		at Hawaii	W 71–66 ^{OT}	10–2 (2–0)	Neal S. Blaisdell Center (5,479); Honolulu, Hawaii
Jan 9, 1981*		UTEP	W 44–42	11–2 (3–0)	War Memorial Fieldhouse (8,107); Laramie, Wyoming
Jan 10, 1981		New Mexico	W 91–54	12–2 (4–0)	War Memorial Fieldhouse (7,814); Laramie, Wyoming
Jan 17, 1981		at Colorado State	W 85–54	13–2 (5–0)	Moby Arena (8,976); Fort Collins, Colorado
Jan 23, 1981		at No. 14 Utah	L 53–55	13–3 (5–1)	Jon M. Huntsman Center (15,122); Salt Lake City, Utah
Jan 24, 1981		at No. 18 BYU	L 70–84	13–4 (5–2)	Marriott Center (22,983); Provo, Utah
Jan 27, 1981*		UNLV	W 71–66	14–4	War Memorial Fieldhouse (7,124); Laramie, Wyoming
Jan 31, 1981		Air Force	W 69–45	15–4 (6–2)	War Memorial Fieldhouse (7,234); Laramie, Wyoming
Feb 5, 1981		Hawaii	W 77–58	16–4 (7–2)	War Memorial Fieldhouse (7,998); Laramie, Wyoming
Feb 7, 1981		San Diego State	W 102–57	17–4 (8–2)	War Memorial Fieldhouse (7,991); Laramie, Wyoming
Feb 12, 1981		at New Mexico	L 56–57	17–5 (8–3)	University Arena (15,803); Albuquerque, New Mexico
Feb 14, 1981		at UTEP	W 63–58	18–5 (9–3)	Special Events Center (8,121); El Paso, Texas
Feb 21, 1981		Colorado State	W 68–40	19–5 (10–3)	War Memorial Fieldhouse (8,665); Laramie, Wyoming
Feb 26, 1981		No. 15 BYU	W 86–84	20–5 (11–3)	War Memorial Fieldhouse (9,300); Laramie, Wyoming
Feb 28, 1981		No. 7 Utah	W 53–50	21–5 (12–3)	War Memorial Fieldhouse (8,974); Laramie, Wyoming
Mar 6, 1981	No. 19	at Air Force	W 46–38	22–5 (13–3)	Clune Arena (6,300); Colorado Springs, Colorado
Mar 7, 1981*	No. 19	at UNLV	W 97–70	23–5	Las Vegas Convention Center (6,393); Las Vegas, Nevada
NCAA tournament
Mar 12, 1981*	(5 W) No. 17	vs. (12 W) Howard; First round	W 78–43	24–5	Pauley Pavilion (12,045); Los Angeles, California
Mar 14, 1981*	(5 W) No. 17	vs. (4 W) No. 19 Illinois; Second round	L 65–67	24–6	Pauley Pavilion (12,340); Los Angeles, California
*Non-conference game. ^{#}Rankings from AP Poll. (#) Tournament seedings in parentheses. W=West.
