= 2007–08 Mississippi Valley State Delta Devils basketball team =

American college basketball season

2007–08 Mississippi Valley State Delta Devils basketball

SWAC tournament champions

NCAA tournament, first round
- Conference: Southwestern Athletic Conference
- Record: 17–16 (12–6 SWAC)
- Head coach: James Green (3rd season)
- Home arena: Harrison HPER Complex

2007–08 SWAC men's basketball standings
| | Conf. | | | | Overall |
| Team | W | | L | PCT | W | | L | PCT |
|---|---|---|---|---|---|---|---|---|
| Alabama State | 15 | – | 3 | .833 | 20 | – | 11 | .645 |
| Mississippi Valley State † | 12 | – | 6 | .667 | 17 | – | 16 | .515 |
| Alabama A&M | 11 | – | 7 | .611 | 14 | – | 15 | .483 |
| Jackson State | 10 | – | 8 | .556 | 14 | – | 20 | .412 |
| Southern | 9 | – | 9 | .500 | 11 | – | 19 | .367 |
| Arkansas–Pine Bluff | 8 | – | 10 | .444 | 13 | – | 18 | .419 |
| Grambling State | 7 | – | 11 | .389 | 7 | – | 19 | .269 |
| Prairie View A&M | 6 | – | 12 | .333 | 8 | – | 22 | .267 |
| Alcorn State | 6 | – | 12 | .333 | 7 | – | 24 | .226 |
| Texas Southern | 6 | – | 12 | .333 | 7 | – | 25 | .219 |
† 2008 SWAC tournament winner Rankings from AP Poll

The 2007–08 Mississippi Valley State Delta Devils basketball team represented Mississippi Valley State University during the 2007–08 NCAA Division I men's basketball season. The Delta Devils, led by third year head coach James Green, played their home games at Harrison HPER Complex and were members of the Southwestern Athletic Conference. The Delta Devils finished the season 17–16, 12–6 in SWAC play to finish second in the SWAC regular season standings. They won the SWAC Basketball tournament to earn the conference's automatic bid into the 2008 NCAA tournament. As No. 16 seed in the West region, they lost in the opening round to UCLA.

== Roster ==
2007–08 Mississippi Valley State Delta Devils men's basketball team
Players
Coaches

| Pos. | # | Name | Height | Weight | Year | Hometown |
|---|---|---|---|---|---|---|
| C | 1 | Larry Cox | 6 ft 10 in (2.08 m) | 225 lb (102 kg) | Sr | Rome, Georgia |
| G | 5 | Stanford Speech | 6 ft 3 in (1.91 m) | 215 lb (98 kg) | Sr | Jackson, Mississippi |
| F | 21 | Carl Lucas | 6 ft 5 in (1.96 m) | 210 lb (95 kg) | Sr | Hollandale, Mississippi |
| G | 23 | Michcael Clark | 6 ft 3 in (1.91 m) | 180 lb (82 kg) | Jr | Tchula, MS |
| F | 34 | Eric Petty | 6 ft 6 in (1.98 m) | 220 lb (100 kg) | Jr | Salinas, CA |
| F | 15 | Chris Watson | 6 ft 6 in (1.98 m) | 220 lb (100 kg) | Sr | Edwards, MS |
| G | 1 | Dwayne Harmason | 5 ft 11 in (1.8 m) | 180 lb (82 kg) | Jr | Plaquemine, LA |
| G | 11 | Mike Davis | 5 ft 8 in (1.73 m) | 160 lb (73 kg) | Sr | Los Angeles, CA |
| G | 3 | Wayne Parks | 6 ft 3 in (1.91 m) | 180 lb (82 kg) | Sr | Memphis, TN |
| F | 22 | Orlando Smith | 6 ft 5 in (1.96 m) | 210 lb (95 kg) | Fr | Columbus, MS |
| G | 35 | Steven Kite | 6 ft 3 in (1.91 m) | 195 lb (88 kg) | Fr | Atlanta, GA |
| C | 21 | Joseph Reed | 6 ft 8 in (2.03 m) | 225 lb (102 kg) | Jr | Houston, TX |
| G | 12 | Michael Higgins | 6 ft 4 in (1.93 m) | 185 lb (84 kg) | So | Greenwood, MS |
| G | 32 | Donald Pritchard | 6 ft 1 in (1.85 m) | 185 lb (84 kg) | Fr | Chicago, IL |
| G | 44 | Jerry Purnell | — | — | Fr | Chicago, IL |
| G | 44 | Julius Love | 6 ft 3 in (1.91 m) | 230 lb (104 kg) | Fr | Jacksonville, Fl |
| G | 25 | Alfred Clark | 6 ft 0 in (1.83 m) | 170 lb (77 kg) | Fr | Oahu, HI |
| G | 33 | Chris Gamble | 6 ft 6 in (1.98 m) | 235 lb (107 kg) | Jr | New Albany, MS |

Head coach

- James Green

Assistant coach(es)

Legend

- (C) Team captain
- (S) Suspended
- (I) Ineligible
- (W) Walk-on
- Injured
- Current redshirt

== Schedule and results ==
| Date time, TV | Rank^{#} | Opponent^{#} | Result | Record | Site (attendance) city, state |
Regular season
| Nov 10, 2007* | | at Ole Miss | L 63–97 | 0–1 | Tad Smith Coliseum; Oxford, Mississippi |
| Nov 15, 2007* | | at No. 19 Pittsburgh | L 45–78 | 0–2 | Petersen Events Center; Pittsburgh, Pennsylvania |
| Nov 17, 2007* | | at Creighton | L 46–76 | 0–3 | Qwest Center Omaha; Omaha, Nebraska |
| Nov 19, 2007* | | Northern Arizona | L 56–65 | 0–4 | Harrison HPER Complex; Itta Bena, Mississippi |
| Nov 23, 2007* | | vs. Air Force; Cougar Hispanic College Fund Challenge | L 40–58 | 0–5 | Spokane Veterans Memorial Arena; Spokane, Washington |
| Nov 24, 2007* | | vs. No. 9 Washington State; Cougar Hispanic College Fund Challenge | L 26–71 | 0–6 | Spokane Veterans Memorial Arena; Spokane, Washington |
| Nov 25, 2007* | | vs. Montana; Cougar Hispanic College Fund Challenge | L 62–69 | 0–7 | Spokane Veterans Memorial Arena; Spokane, Washington |
| Dec 3, 2007* | | at Baylor | L 50–82 | 0–8 | Ferrell Center; Waco, Texas |
| Dec 8, 2007* | | Belhaven | W 83–69 | 1–8 | Harrison HPER Complex; Itta Bena, Mississippi |
| Dec 21, 2007* | | Dillard | W 93–66 | 2–8 | Harrison HPER Complex; Itta Bena, Mississippi |
| Dec 30, 2007* | | at Tulsa | L 46–71 | 2–9 | Donald W. Reynolds Center; Tulsa, Oklahoma |
| Jan 5, 2008 | | Arkansas-Pine Bluff | L 56–60 | 2–10 (0–1) | Harrison HPER Complex; Itta Bena, Mississippi |
| Jan 12, 2008 | | at Alabama State | L 55–71 | 2–11 (0–2) | ASU Acadome; Montgomery, Alabama |
| Jan 14, 2008 | | at Alabama A&M | W 68–63 | 3–11 (1–2) | Elmore Gymnasium; Huntsville, Alabama |
| Jan 19, 2008 | | Alcorn State | W 74–71 | 4–11 (2–2) | Harrison HPER Complex; Itta Bena, Mississippi |
| Jan 21, 2008 | | Southern | W 61–58 | 5–11 (3–2) | Harrison HPER Complex; Itta Bena, Mississippi |
| Jan 26, 2008 | | at Texas Southern | W 98–66 | 6–11 (4–2) | Health and Physical Education Arena; Houston, Texas |
| Jan 28, 2008 | | at Prairie View A&M | L 53–55 | 6–12 (4–3) | William J. Nicks Building; Prairie View, Texas |
| Feb 2, 2008 | | Jackson State | W 81–53 | 7–12 (5–3) | Harrison HPER Complex; Itta Bena, Mississippi |
| Feb 4, 2008 | | Grambling State | L 79–83 | 7–13 (5–4) | Harrison HPER Complex; Itta Bena, Mississippi |
| Feb 9, 2008 | | Alabama State | W 72–60 | 8–13 (6–4) | Harrison HPER Complex; Itta Bena, Mississippi |
| Feb 11, 2008 | | Alabama A&M | L 52–53 | 8–14 (6–5) | Harrison HPER Complex; Itta Bena, Mississippi |
| Feb 16, 2008 | | at Alcorn State | L 67–70 ^{OT} | 8–15 (6–6) | Davey Whitney Complex; Lorman, Mississippi |
| Feb 18, 2008 | | at Southern | W 52–51 | 9–15 (7–6) | F. G. Clark Center; Baton Rouge, Louisiana |
| Feb 23, 2008 | | Texas Southern | W 61–54 | 10–15 (8–6) | Harrison HPER Complex; Itta Bena, Mississippi |
| Feb 25, 2008 | | Prairie View A&M | W 63–59 | 11–15 (9–6) | Harrison HPER Complex; Itta Bena, Mississippi |
| Mar 1, 2008 | | at Jackson State | W 74–73 | 12–15 (10–6) | Williams Assembly Center; Jackson, Mississippi |
| Mar 3, 2008 | | at Grambling State | W 69–63 | 13–15 (11–6) | HPER Complex; Grambling, Louisiana |
| Mar 6, 2008 | | at Arkansas-Pine Bluff | W 54–49 | 14–15 (12–6) | K. L. Johnson Complex; Pine Bluff, Arkansas |
2008 SWAC tournament
| Mar 12, 2008* | | vs. Grambling State; Quarterfinals | W 79–73 | 15–15 | Fair Park Arena; Birmingham, Alabama |
| Mar 14, 2008* | | vs. Arkansas-Pine Bluff; Semifinals | W 70–59 | 16–15 | Fair Park Arena; Birmingham, Alabama |
| Mar 15, 2008* | | vs. Jackson State; Championship Game | W 59–58 | 17–15 | Fair Park Arena; Birmingham, Alabama |
2008 NCAA tournament
| Mar 20, 2008* | (16 W) | vs. (1 W) No. 3 UCLA; First Round | L 29–70 | 17–16 | Honda Center; Anaheim, California |
*Non-conference game. ^{#}Rankings from AP Poll. (#) Tournament seedings in parentheses. W=West. All times are in Central Time.
