= 1997–98 Prairie View A&M Panthers basketball team =

American college basketball season

1997–98 Prairie View A&M Panthers basketball
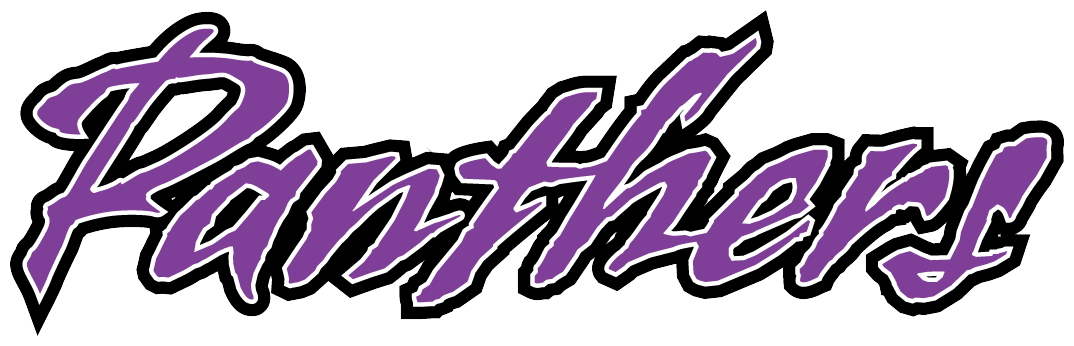

SWAC tournament champions

NCAA tournament
- Conference: Southwestern Athletic Conference
- Record: 13–17 (6–10 SWAC)
- Head coach: Elwood Plummer (13th season)
- Home arena: William Nicks Building

1997–98 SWAC men's basketball standings
	Conf.				Overall
Team	W		L	PCT	W		L	PCT
Texas Southern	12	–	4	.750	15	–	16	.484
Jackson State	11	–	5	.688	14	–	13	.519
Grambling	10	–	6	.625	16	–	12	.571
Southern	10	–	6	.625	14	–	13	.519
Alcorn State	8	–	8	.500	12	–	15	.444
Prairie View A&M †	6	–	10	.375	13	–	17	.433
Alabama State	6	–	10	.375	11	–	17	.393
Mississippi Valley State	6	–	10	.375	6	–	21	.222
Arkansas–Pine Bluff	3	–	13	.188	4	–	23	.148
† 1998 SWAC tournament winner Rankings from AP Poll

The 1997–98 Prairie View A&M Panthers basketball team represented Prairie View A&M University during the 1997–98 NCAA Division I men's basketball season. The Panthers, led by 13th-year head coach Elwood Plummer, played their home games at the William Nicks Building in Prairie View, Texas as members of the Southwestern Athletic Conference. They finished the conference slate at 6–10, to finish in 6th place. In the SWAC Tournament, they defeated Jackson State, Alabama State, and Texas Southern to win the SWAC championship. The Panthers received an automatic bid to the NCAA tournament – the first appearance in program history – as the 16 seed in the Midwest region. Prairie View A&M fell to No. 1 seed Kansas in the opening round to finish the season with a 13–17 record.

== Roster ==
1997–98 Prairie View A&M Panthers men's basketball team
Players	Coaches
Pos. / # / Name / Height / Weight / Year / Hometown; G / / Tamarron Sharpe / 6 ft 3 in (1.91 m) / — / Sr	Head coach: Elwood Plummer; Assistant coach(es) Legend: (C) Team captain; (S) Suspended; (I) Ineligible; (W) Walk-on; Injured; Current redshirt; Roster

== Schedule and results ==
Date time, TV	Rank^{#}	Opponent^{#}	Result	Record	Site (attendance) city, state
Non-conference regular season
Nov 15, 1997*		Philander Smith	W 83–77	1–0	William J. Nicks Building; Prairie View, Texas
Nov 20, 1997		at Arkansas-Pine Bluff	L 74–81	1–1 (0–1)	
Nov 22, 1997*		at Wichita State	L 52–67	1–2	Levitt Arena; Wichita, Kansas
Nov 24, 1997*		Jarvis Christian	W 120–107	2–2	William J. Nicks Building; Prairie View, Texas
Dec 13, 1997*		at Texas Tech	L 63–86	3–3	Lubbock Municipal Coliseum; Lubbock, Texas
Dec 20, 1997*		at No. 18 Ole Miss	L 59–106	3–5	Tad Smith Coliseum; Oxford, Mississippi
Dec 29, 1997*		at Dayton	L 52–110	3–7	University of Dayton Arena; Dayton, Ohio
SWAC regular season
SWAC tournament
Mar 5, 1998*		vs. Jackson State; Quarterfinals	W 60–58	11–16	Reunion Arena; Dallas, Texas
Mar 6, 1998*		vs. Alabama State; Semifinals	W 65–61	12–16	Reunion Arena; Dallas, Texas
Mar 7, 1998*		vs. Texas Southern; Championship game	W 59–57	13–16	Reunion Arena; Dallas, Texas
NCAA tournament
Mar 13, 1998*	(16 MW)	vs. (1 MW) No. 2 Kansas; First round	L 52–110	13–17	Myriad Convention Center; Oklahoma City, Oklahoma
*Non-conference game. ^{#}Rankings from AP Poll. (#) Tournament seedings in parentheses. MW=Midwest. All times are in Central Time.
