= 1980–81 Southern Jaguars basketball team =

American college basketball season

1980–81 Southern Jaguars basketball

SWAC tournament champions

NCAA tournament
- Conference: Southwestern Athletic Conference
- Record: 17–11 (8–4 SWAC)
- Head coach: Carl Stewart
- Home arena: F. G. Clark Center

1980–81 SWAC men's basketball standings
	Conf.				Overall
Team	W		L	PCT	W		L	PCT
Southern †	8	–	4	.667	17	–	11	.607
Alcorn State	8	–	4	.667	17	–	12	.586
Grambling State	7	–	5	.583	18	–	11	.621
Jackson State	7	–	5	.583	16	–	13	.552
Texas Southern	7	–	5	.583	13	–	13	.500
Mississippi Valley State	4	–	8	.333	11	–	16	.407
Prairie View	1	–	11	.083	2	–	23	.080
† 1981 SWAC tournament winner Rankings from AP Poll

The 1980–81 Southern Jaguars basketball team represented Southern University during the 1980–81 NCAA Division I men's basketball season. The Jaguars, led by head coach Carl Stewart, played their home games at the F. G. Clark Center and were members of the Southwestern Athletic Conference. They finished the season 17–11, 8–4 in SWAC play to finish in first place. They were champions of the SWAC tournament to earn an automatic bid to the 1981 NCAA tournament where they lost in the opening round to No. 6 seed Wichita State. This season marked the first appearance in the NCAA Tournament for the Southern men's basketball program.

== Roster ==
1980–81 Southern Jaguars men's basketball team
Players
Coaches

Pos.	#	Name	Height	Weight	Year	Hometown
G		Alvin Jackson	6 ft 0 in (1.83 m)	—	Jr
F		David Williams	6 ft 6 in (1.98 m)	—	Sr

Head coach

- Robert Hopkins

Assistant coach(es)

Legend

- (C) Team captain
- (S) Suspended
- (I) Ineligible
- (W) Walk-on
- Injured
- Current redshirt

== Schedule ==
Date time, TV	Rank^{#}	Opponent^{#}	Result	Record	Site (attendance) city, state
Regular season
Dec 4, 1980*		Howard	W 69–61	3–1	F. G. Clark Center; Baton Rouge, Louisiana
Jan 19, 1981*		at Lamar	L 67–85	8–5	Beaumont Civic Center; Beaumont, Texas
Feb 23, 1981		at Grambling State	L 69–76	15–10 (8–4)	Tiger Memorial Gym; Grambling, Louisiana
1981 SWAC tournament
Mar 7, 1981*		Grambling State; Semifinals	W 69–65	16–10	F. G. Clark Center; Baton Rouge, Louisiana
Mar 8, 1981*		Jackson State; Championship game	W 69–63	17–10	F. G. Clark Center; Baton Rouge, Louisiana
1981 NCAA tournament
Mar 13, 1981*	(11 MW)	vs. (6 MW) Wichita State; First round	L 70–95	17–11	Levitt Arena; Wichita, Kansas
*Non-conference game. ^{#}Rankings from AP Poll. (#) Tournament seedings in parentheses. MW=Midwest. All times are in Central Time.
