= James Green (basketball) =

American basketball coach (born 1960)

Biographical details
- Born: July 8, 1960 (age 66)

Coaching career (HC unless noted)
- 1988–1990: Idaho (assistant)
- 1990–1992: Texas A&M (assistant)
- 1992–1994: Alabama (assistant)
- 1994–1996: Iowa State (assistant)
- 1996–2004: Southern Miss
- 2005–2008: Mississippi Valley State
- 2008–2016: Jacksonville State
- 2016–2024: Meridian CC

Head coaching record
- Overall: 249–315 (college)
- Tournaments: 0–1 (NCAA Division I); 0–3 (NIT)

Accomplishments and honors

Championships
- SWAC regular season (2007); SWAC tournament (2008)

Awards
- C-USA Coach of the Year (2001); SWAC Coach of the Year (2007)

James Green (born July 8, 1960) is an American basketball coach. He was most recently the head men's basketball coach at Meridian Community College in Meridian, Mississippi, a position he held from 2016 until his retirement in 2024. Green served as head men's basketball coach at the University of Southern Mississippi from 1996 to 2004, Mississippi Valley State University from 2005 to 2008, and Jacksonville State University from 2008 to 2016.

== College coaching career ==
Green has held posts as assistant coach at the University of Idaho, Texas A&M University-College Station, University of Alabama and Iowa State University. In 1996, he moved on to the position of head coach at The University of Southern Mississippi and later Mississippi Valley State University.

=== Jacksonville State ===
Green interviewed for the head coaching vacancy left by the non-renewal of head coach, Mike LaPlante, on April 18, 2008, in Jacksonville, Alabama. He took over the Jacksonville State Gamecocks men's basketball program, which that had lost 20 or more games in three of the previous four seasons and expected to take a slight hit due to scholarship reduction because of APR Standards not being met. Green was the first black head coach of a major sport at Jacksonville State University.

== Head coaching record ==
=== College ===
Record table
Season	Team	Overall	Conference	Standing	Postseason
Southern Mississippi Golden Eagles (Conference USA) (1996–2005)
1996–97	Southern Miss	12–15	6–8	T–8th	
1997–98	Southern Miss	22–11	9–7	3rd (National)	NIT First Round
1998–99	Southern Miss	14–16	6–10	2nd (National)	
1999–00	Southern Miss	17–12	7–9	3rd (National)	
2000–01	Southern Miss	22–9	11–5	1st (National)	NIT First Round
2001–02	Southern Miss	10–17	4–12	7th (National)	
2002–03	Southern Miss	13–16	5–11	12th	
2003–04	Southern Miss	13–15	6–10	10th	
Southern Miss:		116–111 (.511)	54–72 (.429)		
Mississippi Valley State Delta Devils (Southwestern Athletic Conference) (2005–2008)
2005–06	Mississippi Valley State	9–19	9–9	6th	
2006–07	Mississippi Valley State	18–16	13–5	1st	NIT First Round
2007–08	Mississippi Valley State	17–16	12–6	2nd	NCAA Division I Round of 64
Mississippi Valley State:		44–51 (.463)	34–20 (.630)		
Jacksonville State Gamecocks (Ohio Valley Conference) (2008–2016)
2008–09	Jacksonville State	11–17	5–14	9th	
2009–10	Jacksonville State	11–19	7–11	7th	
2010–11	Jacksonville State	5–25	3–15	10th	
2011–12	Jacksonville State	15–18	8–8	T–6th	
2012–13	Jacksonville State	17–11	8–8	T–4th (East)	
2013–14	Jacksonville State	10–21	4–12	T–5th (East)	
2014–15	Jacksonville State	12–19	5–11	4th (East)	
2015–16	Jacksonville State	8–23	4–12	6th (East)	
Jacksonville State:		89–153 (.368)	44–91 (.326)		
Total:		249–315 (.441)			
National champion Postseason invitational champion Conference regular season champion Conference regular season and conference tournament champion Division regular season champion Division regular season and conference tournament champion Conference tournament champion
