= 2001 SWAC men's basketball tournament =

Basketball Tournament March 2001 in Alabama

- Classification: Division I
- Season: 2000–01
- Teams: 8
- Site: Bill Harris Arena; Birmingham, Alabama
- Champions: Alabama State (1st title)
- Winning coach: Rob Spivery (1st title)

2000–01 SWAC men's basketball standings
	Conf.				Overall
Team	W		L	PCT	W		L	PCT
Alabama State †	15	–	3	.833	22	–	9	.710
Mississippi Valley State	14	–	4	.778	18	–	9	.667
Alabama A&M	13	–	5	.722	17	–	11	.607
Alcorn State	13	–	5	.722	15	–	15	.500
Southern	8	–	10	.444	11	–	16	.407
Grambling State	8	–	10	.444	8	–	18	.308
Jackson State	7	–	11	.389	7	–	23	.233
Texas Southern	5	–	13	.278	7	–	22	.241
Prairie View A&M	5	–	13	.278	6	–	22	.214
Arkansas–Pine Bluff	2	–	16	.111	2	–	25	.074
† 2001 SWAC tournament winner Rankings from AP Poll

The 2001 SWAC men's basketball tournament was held March 6–10, 2001, at Bill Harris Arena in Birmingham, Alabama. Alabama State defeated Alcorn State, 64–52 in the championship game. The Hornets received the conference's automatic bid to the 2001 NCAA tournament as No. 16 seed in the South Region.

== Bracket and results ==
Quarterfinals; March 6
1	Alabama State	91
8	Prairie View	72
4	Grambling State	50
5	Southern	56
3	Alcorn State	74
6	Jackson State	50
2	Mississippi Valley State	58
7	Texas Southern	59

Semifinals; March 9
1	Alabama State	81
5	Southern	56
3	Alcorn State	76
7	Texas Southern	63

Final; March 10
1	Alabama State	64
3	Alcorn State	52
