= 1988–89 Southern Jaguars basketball team =

American college basketball season

1988–89 Southern Jaguars basketball

SWAC Regular season champions SWAC tournament champions

NCAA tournament
- Conference: Southwestern Athletic Conference
- Record: 20–11 (10–4 SWAC)
- Head coach: Ben Jobe (3rd season)
- Home arena: F. G. Clark Center

1988–89 SWAC men's basketball standings
	Conf.				Overall
Team	W		L	PCT	W		L	PCT
Southern †	10	–	4	.714	20	–	11	.645
Texas Southern	10	–	4	.714	17	–	13	.567
Grambling State	10	–	4	.714	15	–	14	.517
Jackson State	7	–	7	.500	15	–	13	.536
Alabama State	7	–	7	.500	13	–	16	.448
Prairie View A&M	5	–	9	.357	11	–	16	.407
Alcorn State	4	–	10	.286	5	–	23	.179
Mississippi Valley State	3	–	11	.214	8	–	20	.286
† 1989 SWAC tournament winner Rankings from AP Poll

The 1988–89 Southern Jaguars basketball team represented Southern University during the 1988–89 NCAA Division I men's basketball season. The Jaguars, led by head coach Ben Jobe, played their home games at the F. G. Clark Center and were members of the Southwestern Athletic Conference. They finished the season 20–11, 10–4 in SWAC play to finish in a tie for first place. They were champions of the SWAC tournament to earn an automatic bid to the 1989 NCAA tournament where they lost in the opening round to North Carolina.

== Roster ==
1988–89 Southern Jaguars men's basketball team
Players	Coaches
Pos. / # / Name / Height / Weight / Year / Hometown; G / 34 / Bobby Phills / 6 ft 5 in (1.96 m) / 190 lb (86 kg) / So / Baton Rouge, Louisiana	Head coach: Ben Jobe; Assistant coach(es) Legend: (C) Team captain; (S) Suspended; (I) Ineligible; (W) Walk-on; Injured; Current redshirt

== Schedule ==
Date time, TV	Rank^{#}	Opponent^{#}	Result	Record	Site (attendance) city, state
Regular season
Nov 28, 1988*		Miles	W 137–97	1–0	F. G. Clark Activity Center; Baton Rouge, Louisiana
Dec 3, 1988*		at Arkansas-Pine Bluff	W 94–78	2–0	H.O. Clemmons Arena; Pine Bluff, Arkansas
Dec 8, 1988*		at Rice	L 80–83	2–1	Rice Gymnasium; Houston, Texas
Dec 10, 1988*		Cal State Los Angeles	W 97–82	3–1	F. G. Clark Activity Center; Baton Rouge, Louisiana
Dec 16, 1988*		vs. Ole Miss	L 88–90	3–2	
Dec 17, 1988*		at SW Louisiana	W 103–88	4–2	Cajundome; Lafayette, Louisiana
Dec 19, 1988*		at Alabama	L 87–102	4–3	Coleman Coliseum; Tuscaloosa, Alabama
Dec 21, 1988*		at No. 10 Missouri	L 96–114	4–4	Hearnes Center; Columbia, Missouri
Dec 30, 1988*		at Arkansas–Little Rock	L 104–112	4–5	Barton Coliseum; Little Rock, Arkansas
Dec 30, 1988*		vs. Northwestern State	W 105–104	5–5	
1989 SWAC tournament
Mar 9, 1989*		Mississippi Valley State; SWAC Tournament Quarterfinal	W 109–101	14–10	F. G. Clark Activity Center; Baton Rouge, Louisiana
Mar 10, 1989*		Alabama State; SWAC Tournament Semifinal	W 92–77	15–10	F. G. Clark Activity Center; Baton Rouge, Louisiana
Mar 11, 1989*		Texas Southern; SWAC tournament championship	W 86–81	16–10	F. G. Clark Activity Center; Baton Rouge, Louisiana
1989 NCAA tournament
Mar 17, 1989*	(15 SE)	vs. (2 SE) No. 5 North Carolina	L 79–93	20–11	Omni Coliseum; Atlanta, Georgia
*Non-conference game. ^{#}Rankings from AP Poll. (#) Tournament seedings in parentheses. SE=Southeast region. All times are in Central Time.
