= Rob Spivery =

American basketball player and coach (born 1949)

Biographical details
- Born: January 9, 1949 (age 77); Phenix City, Alabama, U.S.

Playing career
- 1968–1970: Grand View
- 1970–1972: Ashland

Coaching career (HC unless noted)
- 1985–1995: Montevallo
- 1995–1996: Ashland
- 1996–2005: Alabama State
- 2005–2011: Southern

Head coaching record
- Overall: 361–407

Accomplishments and honors

Championships
- 2 SWAC regular season (2001, 2006); 3 SWAC tournament (2001, 2004, 2006)

Rob Spivery (born January 9, 1949) is an American college basketball coach and the former head coach of the men's Jaguars basketball team at Southern University. He previously held the same position at Alabama State University. He was hired as Southern's coach on May 5, 2005 and was given a five-year contract, paying $125,000 per annum. On April 2, 2011 it was announced that Southern would not retain his services.

During his early career, Spivery played and coached professionally in Brazil for Trianon Club. He also served as an assistant coach for served as a men's assistant coach at Ashland University, Southern Illinois University and the University of Tulsa.
