= 1997 SWAC men's basketball tournament =

- Classification: Division I
- Season: 1996–97
- Teams: 8
- Site: Riverside Centroplex; Baton Rouge, Louisiana
- Champions: Jackson State (3rd title)
- Winning coach: Andy Stoglin (2nd title)

1996–97 SWAC men's basketball standings
	Conf.				Overall
Team	W		L	PCT	W		L	PCT
Mississippi Valley State	11	–	3	.786	19	–	10	.655
Jackson State †	9	–	5	.643	14	–	16	.467
Alcorn State	8	–	6	.571	11	–	17	.393
Prairie View A&M	7	–	7	.500	10	–	17	.370
Texas Southern	6	–	8	.429	12	–	16	.429
Grambling	5	–	9	.357	10	–	17	.370
Alabama State	5	–	9	.357	8	–	21	.276
Southern	5	–	9	.357	10	–	17	.370
† 1997 SWAC tournament winner Rankings from AP Poll

The 1997 SWAC men's basketball tournament was held March 6–8, 1997, at the Riverside Centroplex in Baton Rouge, Louisiana. Jackson State defeated Mississippi Valley State, 81–74 in the championship game. The Tigers received the conference's automatic bid to the 1997 NCAA tournament as the No. 16 seed in the Southeast Region.

== Bracket and results ==
Quarterfinals; March 6
1	Mississippi Valley State	81
8	Grambling State	54
4	Prairie View A&M	74
5	Texas Southern	90
3	Alcorn State	78
6	Alabama State	72
2	Jackson State	82
7	Southern	77

Semifinals; March 7
1	Mississippi Valley State	87
5	Texas Southern	78
3	Alcorn State	68
2	Jackson State	72

Final; March 8
1	Mississippi Valley State	74
2	Jackson State	81
