= 2004–05 Alabama A&M Bulldogs basketball team =

American college basketball season

2004–05 Alabama A&M Bulldogs basketball
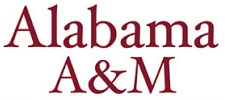

SWAC tournament champions SWAC regular season champions

NCAA tournament
- Conference: Southwestern Athletic Conference
- Record: 18–14 (12–6 SWAC)
- Head coach: L. Vann Pettaway (19th season)
- Home arena: Elmore Gymnasium

2004–05 SWAC men's basketball standings
	Conf.				Overall
Team	W		L	PCT	W		L	PCT
Alabama A&M †	12	–	6	.667	18	–	14	.563
Grambling State	11	–	7	.611	14	–	12	.538
Alabama State	11	–	7	.611	15	–	15	.500
Mississippi Valley State	11	–	7	.611	13	–	15	.464
Jackson State	10	–	8	.556	15	–	17	.469
Southern	10	–	8	.556	14	–	15	.483
Alcorn State	6	–	12	.333	7	–	22	.241
Texas Southern	9	–	9	.500	11	–	15	.423
Arkansas–Pine Bluff	5	–	13	.278	7	–	21	.250
Prairie View A&M	5	–	13	.278	5	–	23	.179
† 2005 SWAC tournament winner Rankings from AP Poll

The 2004–05 Alabama A&M Bulldogs basketball team represented Alabama Agricultural and Mechanical University during the 2004–05 NCAA Division I men's basketball season. The Bulldogs, led by head coach L. Vann Pettaway, played their home games at Elmore Gymnasium and were members of the Southwestern Athletic Conference. They finished the season 18–14, 12–6 in SWAC play to finish as regular season champions. They defeated Arkansas-Pine Bluff, Jackson State, and Alabama State to win the SWAC tournament and secure the conference's automatic bid to the NCAA tournament – the first, and only, appearance in school history.

== Roster ==
2004–05 Alabama A&M Bulldogs men's basketball team
Players	Coaches
Pos. / # / Name / Height / Weight / Year / Hometown; G / 12 / Obie Trotter / 6 ft 1 in (1.85 m) / 180 lb (82 kg) / Jr / Robertsdale, Alabama	Head coach: L. Vann Pettaway; Assistant coach(es) Legend: (C) Team captain; (S) Suspended; (I) Ineligible; (W) Walk-on; Injured; Current redshirt; Roster

== Schedule and results ==
Date time, TV	Rank^{#}	Opponent^{#}	Result	Record	Site (attendance) city, state
Regular season
Dec 1, 2004*		at Georgia	L 54–71	1–3	Stegeman Coliseum; Athens, Georgia
Dec 11, 2004*		at Texas A&M	L 68–71	3–4	Reed Arena; College Station, Texas
Dec 28, 2004*		at UAB	L 68–100	3–7	Bartow Arena; Birmingham, Alabama
SWAC tournament
Mar 10, 2005*		vs. Arkansas-Pine Bluff; Quarterfinals	W 64–52	16–13	BJCC Arena; Birmingham, Alabama
Mar 11, 2005*		vs. Jackson State; Semifinals	W 74–56	17–13	BJCC Arena; Birmingham, Alabama
Mar 13, 2005*		vs. Alabama State; Championship game	W 72–53	18–13	BJCC Arena; Birmingham, Alabama
NCAA tournament
Mar 15, 2005*	(16 SYR)	vs. (16 SYR) Oakland; Play-in game	L 69–79	18–14	UD Arena; Dayton, Ohio
*Non-conference game. ^{#}Rankings from AP Poll. (#) Tournament seedings in parentheses. SYR=Syracuse. All times are in Central Time.
