= 1981 SWAC men's basketball tournament =

Basketball Tournament March 1981 in Louisiana

- Classification: Division I
- Season: 1980–81
- Teams: 7
- First round site: Campus Sites
- Semifinals site: F. G. Clark Center; Baton Rouge, Louisiana
- Finals site: F. G. Clark Center; Baton Rouge, Louisiana
- Champions: Southern (1st title)
- Winning coach: Carl Stewart (1st title)

1980–81 SWAC men's basketball standings
	Conf.				Overall
Team	W		L	PCT	W		L	PCT
Southern †	8	–	4	.667	17	–	11	.607
Alcorn State	8	–	4	.667	17	–	12	.586
Grambling State	7	–	5	.583	18	–	11	.621
Jackson State	7	–	5	.583	16	–	13	.552
Texas Southern	7	–	5	.583	13	–	13	.500
Mississippi Valley State	4	–	8	.333	11	–	16	.407
Prairie View	1	–	11	.083	2	–	23	.080
† 1981 SWAC tournament winner Rankings from AP Poll

The 1981 SWAC men's basketball tournament was held March 5–7, 1981. The quarterfinal round was held at the home arena of the higher-seeded team, while the semifinal and championship rounds were held at the F. G. Clark Center in Baton Rouge, Louisiana. Southern defeated Jackson State, 69–63 in the championship game. The Jaguars received the conference's automatic bid to the 1981 NCAA tournament as No. 11 seed in the Midwest Region.

== Bracket and results ==
Quarterfinals; March 5 & 6
4	Grambling State	68
5	Texas Southern	66
3	Jackson State	83
6	Mississippi Valley State	70
2	Alcorn State	90
7	Prairie View	79

Semifinals; March 7
1	Southern	69
4	Grambling State	65
3	Jackson State	71
2	Alcorn State	69

Final; March 8
1	Southern	69
3	Jackson State	63
Third place
4	Grambling State	77
2	Alcorn State	74
