= 1994 SWAC men's basketball tournament =

- Classification: Division I
- Season: 1993–94
- Teams: 8
- Site: Riverside Centroplex; Baton Rouge, Louisiana
- Champions: Texas Southern (2nd title)
- Winning coach: Robert Moreland (2nd title)

1993–94 SWAC men's basketball standings
	Conf.				Overall
Team	W		L	PCT	W		L	PCT
Texas Southern †	12	–	2	.857	19	–	11	.633
Jackson State	11	–	3	.786	19	–	10	.655
Alabama State	10	–	4	.714	19	–	10	.655
Southern	8	–	6	.571	16	–	11	.593
Mississippi Valley State	6	–	8	.429	10	–	17	.370
Grambling State	4	–	10	.286	9	–	18	.333
Alcorn State	3	–	11	.214	3	–	24	.111
Prairie View A&M	2	–	12	.143	5	–	22	.185
† 1994 SWAC tournament winner Rankings from AP Poll

The 1994 SWAC men's basketball tournament was held March 11–13, 1994, at the Riverside Centroplex in Baton Rouge, Louisiana. Texas Southern defeated Jackson State, 70–67 in the championship game. The Tigers received the conference's automatic bid to the 1994 NCAA tournament as No. 15 seed in the Southeast Region.

== Bracket and results ==
Quarterfinals; March 11
1	Texas Southern	119
8	Prairie View A&M	70
4	Southern	94
5	Mississippi Valley State	86
3	Alabama State	70
6	Grambling State	66
2	Jackson State	71
7	Alcorn State	53

Semifinals; March 12
1	Texas Southern	106
4	Southern	84
3	Alabama State	65
2	Jackson State	83

Final; March 13
1	Texas Southern	70
2	Jackson State	67
