= 2005 SWAC men's basketball tournament =

Basketball Tournament March 2004 in Alabama

- Classification: Division I
- Season: 2004–05
- Teams: 8
- Site: Bill Harris Arena; Birmingham, Alabama
- Champions: Alabama A&M (1st title)
- Winning coach: L. Vann Pettaway (1st title)

2004–05 SWAC men's basketball standings
	Conf.				Overall
Team	W		L	PCT	W		L	PCT
Alabama A&M †	12	–	6	.667	18	–	14	.563
Grambling State	11	–	7	.611	14	–	12	.538
Alabama State	11	–	7	.611	15	–	15	.500
Mississippi Valley State	11	–	7	.611	13	–	15	.464
Jackson State	10	–	8	.556	15	–	17	.469
Southern	10	–	8	.556	14	–	15	.483
Alcorn State	6	–	12	.333	7	–	22	.241
Texas Southern	9	–	9	.500	11	–	15	.423
Arkansas–Pine Bluff	5	–	13	.278	7	–	21	.250
Prairie View A&M	5	–	13	.278	5	–	23	.179
† 2005 SWAC tournament winner Rankings from AP Poll

The 2005 SWAC men's basketball tournament was held March 10–13, 2005, at Bill Harris Arena in Birmingham, Alabama. Alabama A&M defeated Alabama State, 72–53 in the championship game. The Jaguars received the conference's automatic bid to the 2005 NCAA tournament as one of two No. 16 seeds in the East Region. In the play-in game, Alabama A&M was beaten by Oakland.

== Bracket and results ==
Quarterfinals; March 10
1	Alabama A&M	64
8	Arkansas–Pine Bluff	52
4	Mississippi Valley State	55
5	Jackson State	57
3	Grambling State	65
6	Southern	69
2	Alabama State	64
7	Prairie View A&M	56

Semifinals; March 11
1	Alabama A&M	74
5	Jackson State	56
3	Southern	50
2	Alabama State	54

Final; March 13
1	Alabama A&M	72
2	Alabama State	53
