= 2008 SWAC men's basketball tournament =

- Classification: Division I
- Season: 2007–08
- Teams: 8
- Site: Fair Park Arena; Birmingham, Alabama
- Champions: Mississippi Valley State (4th title)
- Winning coach: James Green (1st title)
- MVP: Carl Lucas (Mississippi Valley State)

2007–08 SWAC men's basketball standings
	Conf.				Overall
Team	W		L	PCT	W		L	PCT
Alabama State	15	–	3	.833	20	–	11	.645
Mississippi Valley State †	12	–	6	.667	17	–	16	.515
Alabama A&M	11	–	7	.611	14	–	15	.483
Jackson State	10	–	8	.556	14	–	20	.412
Southern	9	–	9	.500	11	–	19	.367
Arkansas–Pine Bluff	8	–	10	.444	13	–	18	.419
Grambling State	7	–	11	.389	7	–	19	.269
Prairie View A&M	6	–	12	.333	8	–	22	.267
Alcorn State	6	–	12	.333	7	–	24	.226
Texas Southern	6	–	12	.333	7	–	25	.219
† 2008 SWAC tournament winner Rankings from AP Poll

The 2008 Southwestern Athletic Conference men's basketball tournament took place March 12–15, 2008, at Fair Park Arena in Birmingham, Alabama.

== Format ==
The top eight eligible men's basketball teams in the Southwestern Athletic Conference receive a berth in the conference tournament. After the conference season, teams are seeded by conference record.

== Bracket ==
Quarterfinals; March 12 – March 13
1	Alabama State	67
8	Texas Southern	49
4	Jackson State	56
5	Southern	55
3	Alabama A&M	59
6	Arkansas–Pine Bluff	72
7	Grambling State	73
2	Mississippi Valley State	79

Semifinals; March 14
1	Alabama State	72
4	Jackson State	77
6	Arkansas–Pine Bluff	59
2	Mississippi Valley State	70

Finals; March 16
4	Jackson State	58
2	Mississippi Valley State	59
