= L. Vann Pettaway =

American basketball player and coach

Current position
- Title: Head coach
- Team: Alabama A&M
- Record: 384-181

Biographical details
- Born: (United States) Selma, Alabama

Playing career
- 1975–1977: Selma
- 1978–1980: Alabama A&M

Coaching career (HC unless noted)
- 1986–2011: Alabama A&M

Head coaching record
- Overall: 384-181

Accomplishments and honors

Championships
- SWAC Tournament Championship (2005); SWAC Regular Season Championship (2005)

L. Vann Pettaway (born c. 1957) is the former men's basketball coach at Alabama A&M. He served 25 years as the Bulldogs' head coach. During his tenure at Alabama A&M, the school moved up to Division I and competed in the 2005 NCAA Tournament. He has compiled over 400 wins. In 2011, Pettaway was fired from his position as Alabama A&M's head coach.

Pettaway graduated from Alabama A&M in 1980. He also received a master's degree in 1991.

Pettaway is married to his wife Glenn. They have two children.

== Head coaching record ==
Record table
Season	Team	Overall	Conference	Standing	Postseason
Alabama A&M Bulldogs (Southern Intercollegiate Athletic Conference) (1986–1999)
1986–87	Alabama A&M	23–7	12–1	1st	NCAA Division II Tournament
1987–88	Alabama A&M	29–3	13–0	1st	NCAA Division II Quarterfinals
1988–89	Alabama A&M	26–6	11–1	1st	NCAA Division II Tournament
1989–90	Alabama A&M	18–9	6–3		
1990–91	Alabama A&M	16–14	10–4		
1991–92	Alabama A&M	15–15	4–10		
1992–93	Alabama A&M	28–3	13–1	1st	NCAA Division II Tournament
1993–94	Alabama A&M	27–5	11–3	1st	NCAA Division II Quarterfinals
1994–95	Alabama A&M	29–3	13–1	1st	NCAA Division II Quarterfinals
1995–96	Alabama A&M	28–3	15–1	1st	NCAA Division II Quarterfinals
1996–97	Alabama A&M	24–6			NCAA Division II Tournament
1997–98	Alabama A&M	18–9			
1998–99	Alabama A&M	10–17	0–0		
Alabama A&M:		291–100 (.744)			
Alabama A&M Bulldogs (Southwestern Athletic Conference) (1999–2011)
1999–2000	Alabama A&M	18–10	14–4	T–2nd	
2000–01	Alabama A&M	17–11	13–5	T–3rd	
2001–02	Alabama A&M	19–10	12–6	T–2nd	
2002–03	Alabama A&M	8–19	4–14	T–9th	
2003–04	Alabama A&M	13–17	9–9	T–4th	
2004–05	Alabama A&M	18–14	12–6	1st	NCAA Division I Tournament
2005–06	Alabama A&M	13–13	11–7	T–2nd	
2006–07	Alabama A&M	10–20	4–14	10th	
2007–08	Alabama A&M	14–15	11–7	3rd	
2008–09	Alabama A&M	8–19	6–12	8th	
2009–10	Alabama A&M	11–15	8–10	T–6th	
2010–11	Alabama A&M	13–15	10–8	5th	
Alabama A&M:		162–178 (.476)	114–102 (.528)		
Total:		453–278 (.620)			
National champion Postseason invitational champion Conference regular season champion Conference regular season and conference tournament champion Division regular season champion Division regular season and conference tournament champion Conference tournament champion
