= Edward H. Adams =

American football and basketball coach (1910–1958)

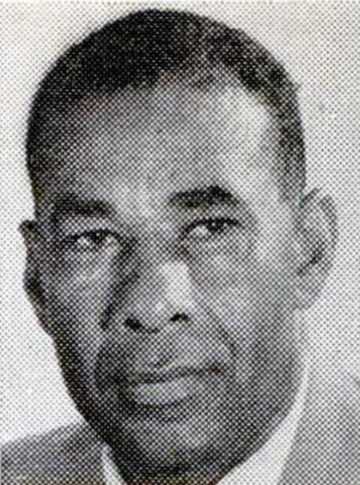
- Adams, circa 1955

Biographical details
- Born: August 17, 1910; Grambling, Louisiana, U.S.
- Died: November 22, 1958 (aged 48); Houston, Texas, U.S.

Playing career

Football
- c. 1930: Tuskegee

Coaching career (HC unless noted)

Football
- 1936: North Carolina Central

Basketball
- 1936–1937: North Carolina Central
- 1937–1949: Tuskegee
- 1949–1958: Texas Southern

Head coaching record
- Overall: 4–3–1 (football); 464–135 (basketball)

Edward Haygood Adams (August 17, 1910 – October 22, 1958) was an American football and basketball coach.

== Biography ==
Adams was born on August 17, 1910, in Grambling, Louisiana. He was the son of Martha and Charles P. Adams, founder and first President of Grambling University. (Note: Adams' Associated Press obituary erroneously says he was 58 years old, which would have him born in 1900, but his death certificate uses August 17, 1910, which is consistent with his entries in the United States censuses and the World War II draft registration.) He attended Tuskegee University.

Adams served as the sixth head football coach at the North Carolina College for Negroes—now known as North Carolina Central University—in Durham, North Carolina, and he held that position for the 1936 season, compiling a record of 4–3–1. Adams was also the head basketball coach at North Carolina Central for one season in 1936–37, at Tuskegee University from 1937 to 1949, and at Texas Southern University from 1949 to 1958, amassing a career college basketball coaching record of 464–135.

Adams died of a stroke on October 22, 1958, at St. Elizabeths Hospital in Houston, Texas.

== Head coaching record ==
=== Football ===
Year	Team	Overall	Conference	Standing	Bowl/playoffs
North Carolina College Eagles (Colored Intercollegiate Athletic Association) (1936)
1936	North Carolina College	4–3–1	3–3–1	7th	
North Carolina College:		4–3–1	3–3–1		
Total:		4–3–1			

== Works ==
- A Comparative Anthropometric Study of Hard Labor during Youth as a Stimulator of Physical Growth of Young Colored Women in Research Quarterly of the American Association for Health and Physical Education
