= 1989 SWAC men's basketball tournament =

American collegiate postseason men's basketball season

- Classification: Division I
- Season: 1988–89
- Teams: 8
- Site: F. G. Clark Center; Baton Rouge, Louisiana
- Champions: Southern (5th title)
- Winning coach: Ben Jobe (3rd title)

1988–89 SWAC men's basketball standings
	Conf.				Overall
Team	W		L	PCT	W		L	PCT
Southern †	10	–	4	.714	20	–	11	.645
Texas Southern	10	–	4	.714	17	–	13	.567
Grambling State	10	–	4	.714	15	–	14	.517
Jackson State	7	–	7	.500	15	–	13	.536
Alabama State	7	–	7	.500	13	–	16	.448
Prairie View A&M	5	–	9	.357	11	–	16	.407
Alcorn State	4	–	10	.286	5	–	23	.179
Mississippi Valley State	3	–	11	.214	8	–	20	.286
† 1989 SWAC tournament winner Rankings from AP Poll

The 1989 SWAC men's basketball tournament was held March 9–11, 1989, at F. G. Clark Center in Baton Rouge, Louisiana. Southern defeated Texas Southern, 86–81 in the championship game, to gain an automatic berth to the NCAA tournament. The Jaguars received the #15 seed in the Southeast region.

== Bracket and results ==
Quarterfinals; Saturday, March 9
1	Southern	109
8	Mississippi Valley State	101
4	Jackson State	76
5	Alabama State	77
3	Texas Southern	77
6	Prairie View A&M	55
2	Grambling State	83
7	Alcorn State	70

Semifinals; Sunday, March 10
1	Southern	92
5	Alabama State	77
3	Texas Southern	84
2	Grambling	81

Final; Monday, March 11
1	Southern	86
3	Texas Southern	81
