= 1995 SWAC men's basketball tournament =

- Classification: Division I
- Season: 1994–95
- Teams: 6
- Site: Riverside Centroplex; Baton Rouge, Louisiana
- Champions: Texas Southern (3rd title)
- Winning coach: Robert Moreland (3rd title)

1994–95 SWAC men's basketball standings
	Conf.				Overall
Team	W		L	PCT	W		L	PCT
Texas Southern †	12	–	2	.857	22	–	7	.759
Mississippi Valley State	10	–	4	.714	17	–	11	.607
Alabama State	8	–	6	.571	11	–	15	.423
Southern	7	–	7	.500	13	–	13	.500
Jackson State	7	–	7	.500	12	–	19	.387
Grambling State	5	–	9	.357	11	–	17	.393
Alcorn State	4	–	10	.286	7	–	19	.269
Prairie View A&M	3	–	11	.214	6	–	21	.222
† 1995 SWAC tournament winner Rankings from AP Poll

The 1995 SWAC men's basketball tournament was held March 10–12, 1995, at the Riverside Centroplex in Baton Rouge, Louisiana. Texas Southern defeated Mississippi Valley State, 75–62 in the championship game. The Tigers received the conference's automatic bid to the 1995 NCAA tournament as No. 15 seed in the Midwest Region.

== Bracket and results ==
First round March 10
5	Southern	82
6	Grambling State	85
4	Jackson State	78
8	Prairie View A&M	65

Semifinals; March 11
1	Texas Southern	100
6	Grambling State	63
4	Jackson State	66
2	Mississippi Valley State	70

Final; March 12
1	Texas Southern	75
2	Mississippi Valley State	62
