= 1990 SWAC men's basketball tournament =

- Classification: Division I
- Season: 1989–90
- Teams: 8
- Site: Health and Physical Education Arena; Houston, Texas
- Champions: Texas Southern (1st title)
- Winning coach: Robert Moreland (1st title)

1989–90 SWAC men's basketball standings
	Conf.				Overall
Team	W		L	PCT	W		L	PCT
Southern	12	–	2	.857	25	–	6	.806
Texas Southern †	10	–	4	.714	19	–	12	.613
Alabama State	7	–	7	.500	15	–	13	.536
Mississippi Valley State	7	–	7	.500	11	–	18	.379
Alcorn State	6	–	8	.429	7	–	22	.241
Prairie View A&M	5	–	9	.357	9	–	18	.333
Grambling	5	–	9	.357	9	–	19	.321
Jackson State	4	–	10	.286	9	–	19	.321
† 1990 SWAC tournament winner Rankings from AP Poll

The 1990 SWAC men's basketball tournament was held March 7–9, 1990, at the Health and Physical Education Arena in Houston, Texas. Texas Southern defeated Southern, 94–89 in the championship game, to gain an automatic berth to the NCAA tournament. The Tigers received the #14 seed in the Midwest region.

== Bracket and results ==
Quarterfinals; Saturday, March 7
1	Southern	83
8	Jackson State	73
4	Alabama State	108
5	Alcorn State	119
3	Mississippi Valley State	83
6	Grambling State	82
2	Texas Southern	89
7	Prairie View	60

Semifinals; Sunday, March 8
1	Southern	120
5	Alcorn State	94
3	Mississippi Valley State	75
2	Texas Southern	105

Final; Monday, March 9
1	Southern	89
2	Texas Southern	94
