= 2000 SWAC men's basketball tournament =

Basketball Tournament March 2000 in Mississippi

- Classification: Division I
- Season: 1999–00
- Teams: 8
- Site: Mississippi Coast Coliseum; Biloxi, Mississippi
- Champions: Jackson State
- Winning coach: Andy Stoglin

1999–2000 SWAC men's basketball standings
	Conf.				Overall
Team	W		L	PCT	W		L	PCT
Alcorn State	15	–	3	.833	19	–	10	.655
Alabama A&M	14	–	4	.778	18	–	10	.643
Southern	14	–	4	.778	18	–	11	.621
Texas Southern	10	–	8	.556	15	–	14	.517
Jackson State †	10	–	8	.556	17	–	16	.515
Alabama State	10	–	8	.556	13	–	15	.464
Mississippi Valley State	7	–	11	.389	6	–	21	.222
Prairie View A&M	5	–	13	.278	7	–	20	.259
Arkansas–Pine Bluff	5	–	13	.278	6	–	21	.222
Grambling State	0	–	18	.000	1	–	30	.032
† 2000 SWAC tournament winner Rankings from AP Poll

The 2000 SWAC men's basketball tournament was held March 9–11, 2000, at the Mississippi Coast Coliseum in Biloxi, Mississippi. Jackson State defeated Southern, 76–61 in the championship game. The Tigers received the conference's automatic bid to the 2000 NCAA tournament as No. 16 seed in the West Region.

== Bracket and results ==
Quarterfinals; March 9
1	Alcorn State	94
8	Grambling State	82
4	Alabama State	50
5	Jackson State	56
3	Texas Southern	74
6	Mississippi Valley State	50
2	Southern	77
7	Prairie View A&M	74

Semifinals; March 10
1	Alcorn State	60
5	Jackson State	64
3	Texas Southern	65
2	Southern	66

Final; March 11
5	Jackson State	76
2	Southern	61
