= 1996–97 Jackson State Tigers basketball team =

American college basketball season

1996–97 Jackson State Tigers basketball

SWAC tournament champions

NCAA tournament, First Round
- Conference: Southwestern Athletic Conference
- Record: 14–16 (9–5 SWAC)
- Head coach: Andy Stoglin (8th season)
- Home arena: Williams Assembly Center

1996–97 SWAC men's basketball standings
	Conf.				Overall
Team	W		L	PCT	W		L	PCT
Mississippi Valley State	11	–	3	.786	19	–	10	.655
Jackson State †	9	–	5	.643	14	–	16	.467
Alcorn State	8	–	6	.571	11	–	17	.393
Prairie View A&M	7	–	7	.500	10	–	17	.370
Texas Southern	6	–	8	.429	12	–	16	.429
Grambling	5	–	9	.357	10	–	17	.370
Alabama State	5	–	9	.357	8	–	21	.276
Southern	5	–	9	.357	10	–	17	.370
† 1997 SWAC tournament winner Rankings from AP Poll

The 1996–97 Jackson State Tigers basketball team represented Jackson State University in the 1996–97 NCAA Division I men's basketball season. The Tigers, led by 8th-year head coach Andy Stoglin, played their home games at the Williams Assembly Center in Jackson, Mississippi as members of the Southwestern Athletic Conference. After finishing the conference regular season tied for second in the standings, Jackson State won the SWAC tournament to receive an automatic bid to the NCAA tournament. As No. 16 seed in the Southeast region, the Tigers were beaten by No. 1 seed Kansas in the opening round.

== Roster ==
1996–97 Jackson State Tigers men's basketball team
Players	Coaches
Pos. / # / Name / Height / Weight / Year / Hometown; F / / Trent Pulliam / 6 ft 8 in (2.03 m) / — / Jr	Head coach: Andy Stoglin; Assistant coach(es) Legend: (C) Team captain; (S) Suspended; (I) Ineligible; (W) Walk-on; Injured; Current redshirt; Roster

== Schedule and results ==
Date time, TV	Rank^{#}	Opponent^{#}	Result	Record	Site (attendance) city, state
Regular season
Nov 22, 1996*		at No. 16 Arkansas	L 74–127	0–1	Bud Walton Arena; Fayetteville, Arkansas
Nov 26, 1996*		at Southern Miss	L 54–68	0–2	Reed Green Coliseum; Hattiesburg, MS
Nov 30, 1996*		Southeastern Louisiana	W 92–53	1–2	Williams Assembly Center; Jackson, MS
Dec 2, 1996*		at Memphis	L 58–65	1–3	The Pyramid; Memphis, TN
Dec 4, 1996*		Tougaloo	W 78–70	2–3	Williams Assembly Center; Jackson, MS
Dec 7, 1996*		Eastern Michigan	L 69–84	2–4	Williams Assembly Center; Jackson, MS
Dec 14, 1996*		at No. 8 Arizona	L 83–111	2–5	McKale Center; Tucson, AZ
Dec 17, 1996*		at No. 24 UCLA	L 67–93	2–6	Pauley Pavilion; Los Angeles, CA
Dec 20, 1996*		at Arizona State	L 69–83	2–7	Wells Fargo Arena; Tempe, AZ
Dec 23, 1996*		at No. 14 New Mexico	L 45–98	2–8	University Arena; Albuquerque, NM
Dec 28, 1996		at McNeese	L 71–89	2–9	Burton Coliseum; Lake Charles, LA
Jan 2, 1997*		Tennessee State	L 75–86	2–10	Williams Assembly Center; Jackson, MS
Jan 4, 1997		at Prairie View A&M	L 65–80	2–11 (0–1)	William J. Nicks Building; Prairie View, TX
Jan 6, 1997		at Texas Southern	L 70–78	2–12 (0–2)	H&PE Arena; Houston, TX
Jan 11, 1997		Alcorn State	W 70–58	3–12 (1–2)	Williams Assembly Center; Jackson, MS
Jan 13, 1997		Southern	W 88–77	4–12 (2–2)	Williams Assembly Center; Jackson, MS
Jan 18, 1997		Grambling State	W 74–65	5–12 (3–2)	Williams Assembly Center; Jackson, MS
Jan 20, 1997		Mississippi Valley State	L 62–63	5–13 (3–3)	Williams Assembly Center; Jackson, MS
Jan 25, 1997		at Alabama State	L 55–58	5–14 (3–4)	Joe L. Reed Acadome; Montgomery, AL
Feb 1, 1997		Prairie View A&M	W 89–67	6–14 (4–4)	Williams Assembly Center; Jackson, MS
Feb 3, 1997		Texas Southern	W 73–62	7–14 (5–4)	Williams Assembly Center; Jackson, MS
Feb 8, 1997		at Alcorn State	L 52–53	7–15 (5–5)	Davey Whitney Complex; Lorman, MS
Feb 10, 1997		at Southern	W 86–75	8–15 (6–5)	F.G. Clark Center; Baton Rouge, LA
Feb 15, 1997		vs. Grambling State	W 69–60	9–15 (7–5)	Fant–Ewing Coliseum; Monroe, LA
Feb 17, 1997		at Mississippi Valley State	W 83–69	10–15 (8–5)	Harrison HPER Complex; Itta Bena, MS
Feb 22, 1997		Alabama State	W 69–59	11–15 (9–5)	Williams Assembly Center; Jackson, MS
SWAC tournament
Mar 6, 1997*	(2)	vs. (7) Southern; Quarterfinals	W 82–77	12–15	Riverside Centroplex; Baton Rouge, LA
Mar 7, 1997*	(2)	vs. (3) Alcorn State; Semifinals	W 72–68	13–15	Riverside Centroplex; Baton Rouge, LA
Mar 8, 1997*	(2)	vs. (1) Mississippi Valley State; Championship game	W 81–74	14–15	Riverside Centroplex; Baton Rouge, LA
NCAA tournament
Mar 13, 1997*	(16 SE)	vs. (1 SE) No. 1 Kansas; First round	L 64–78	14–16	The Pyramid; Memphis, TN
*Non-conference game. ^{#}Rankings from AP Poll. (#) Tournament seedings in parentheses. All times are in Central.
