= A.B. Williamson =

American basketball coach

Personal information
- Born: March 23, 1945 Lynchburg, Virginia, U.S.
- Died: June 2, 2024 (aged 79) Largo, Maryland, U.S.

Career information
- High school: Spingarn (Washington, D.C.)
- Coaching career: 1972–1990

Career history

Coaching
- 1972–1975: Eastern HS
- 1975–1990: Howard

Career highlights
- As coach: 3× MEAC Coach of the Year (1980, 1983, 1987); 3× MEAC regular season champion (1980, 1983, 1987); 2× MEAC Tournament champion (1980, 1981)

Altha Bassett "A.B." Williamson (March 23, 1945 – June 2, 2024) was an American basketball coach.

== Coaching career ==
Williamson was the men's basketball head coach at Howard University from 1975 until 1990.

Through his career at Howard, Williamson earned many coaching awards and team championships. Individually, he was MEAC Coach of the Year three times in 1980, 1983, and 1987. Under his leadership, the Bison were MEAC regular season champions in 1980, 1983, and 1987, MEAC tournament champions in 1980 and 1981, and made an NCAA tournament appearance in 1981. Williamson was 0–1 in his NCAA tourney appearances, losing to Wyoming 78–43.

== Death ==
On June 2, 2024, Williamson died at the age of 79 at the University of Maryland Capitol Region Medical Center in Largo, Maryland.
