= Elwood Plummer =

American basketball coach

Biographical details
- Born: October 22, 1944; San Antonio, Texas, U.S.
- Died: October 24, 2023 (aged 79); San Antonio, Texas, U.S.
- Education: Jackson State

Coaching career (HC unless noted)
- 1967–1969: St. Philip's
- 1969–1972: Jackson State (assistant)
- 1972–1973: Wiley
- 1973–1979: Prairie View A&M
- 1979–1988: Huston–Tillotson
- 1990–2002: Prairie View A&M
- 2010–2013: Huston–Tillotson

Administrative career (AD unless noted)
- 1988–1990: Huston–Tillotson (assistant AD)

Head coaching record
- Overall: 153–377 (.305)
- Tournaments: 0–1 (NCAA)

Elwood Overton Plummer (October 22, 1944 – October 24, 2023) was an American basketball coach and player. He served as the head coach of the Prairie View A&M Panthers from 1973 to 1979, and 1990 to 2002.

== Playing career ==
Plummer was born in San Antonio, Texas, and attended Wheatley High School. He played on the school's basketball team and averaged 28 points per game as a senior. Plummer attended San Antonio College for two years and became one of the most prolific scorers in the junior college ranks. During his sophomore season, he led the Texas Junior College Athletic Association in scoring with 29.8 points per game and was named the league's most valuable player. Plummer transferred to play for the Jackson State Tigers and became one of the top guards in the Southwestern Athletic Conference (SWAC). He graduated from Jackson State University in 1966.

== Coaching career ==
Plummer began his coaching career at St. Philip's College in San Antonio for two seasons, where he accumulated a 41–19 record. He returned to the Jackson State Tigers team in 1969 as an assistant coach to Paul Covington. Plummer was appointed as head coach of the Wiley College basketball team in 1972, where he amassed a 20–8 record and won the state tournament in his only season.

Plummer was named head coach of the Prairie View A&M Panthers on August 25, 1973, where he became the youngest head coach in the SWAC at the age of 28. He directed winning teams from 1973 to 1979. Plummer served as the head coach of the Huston–Tillotson University men's basketball team from 1979 to 1988. He was the associate athletic director of Huston–Tillotson from 1988 to 1990.

Plummer returned to Prairie View A&M in April 1990 but the university discontinued its basketball program one month later. It was reinstated in July 1990 but with few remaining players and no scholarship program. Prairie View A&M's limited recruitment abilities led to Plummer targeting players who had a high academic average that would qualify for an academic scholarship or those who were indigent and qualified for financial aid. The Panthers had an 0–28 record during the 1991–92 season that established an NCAA Division I record for most losses in a season. Plummer experienced his greatest success with the Panthers during the 1997–98 season as the team won its first SWAC tournament title and appeared in the 1998 NCAA Division I men's basketball tournament.

On March 10, 2002, Plummer and his coaching staff were dismissed by Prairie View A&M. His total record with the Panthers was 153–377. Plummer returned to Huston–Tillotson in 2010 as head coach until his departure in 2013.

Plummer was inducted into the Texas Black Sports Hall of Fame in 2006.

== Personal life ==
Plummer married twice and had a daughter.

Plummer died on October 24, 2023, at the age of 79 in San Antonio, Texas.
