= Ronnie Courtney =

Current position
- Title: Head Basketball Coach
- Team: Fort Bend Marshall Buffalos

Biographical details
- Born: October 6, 1957 (age 69); Houston, Texas, U.S.

Playing career
- 1976–1980: McMurry
- Position: Point guard

Coaching career (HC unless noted)
- 1997–2001: Willowridge HS
- 2001–2007: Texas Southern

Ronnie Courtney (born October 6, 1957) began his coaching career at Furr High School as an assistant football, basketball, and track coach. After eight years, he moved to Jefferson Davis High School as the head basketball coach, assistant football coach, and assistant track coach. While at Jeff Davis, his basketball team made the play-offs five of the eight years and Coach Courtney was named Greater Houston Coach of the Year and District Coach of the Year twice, compiling a record of 137–76. He then moved to Willowridge High School for four years where, as head basketball coach, he led his teams to back-to-back State titles in 2000 and 2001. Coach Courtney was named State Coach of the Year both years. In 2001, he was named National High School Coach of the Year. His record at Willowridge High School was 100–44. In 2001, Coach Courtney accepted the head basketball coaching position at Texas Southern University. In 2001, he was named Insider.com College Coach of the Year. In 2003, he led Texas Southern University to the NCAA tournament and was named Southwestern Athletic Conference Coach of the Year. He compiled a record of 77-98 while at Texas Southern. Courtney was fired from Texas Southern University on July 19, 2007.

Later in 2007, Ronnie Courtney became the head basketball coach at George Bush High School in Richmond, TX. In his third season, 2009–2010, his team won the Texas 5A Boys’ Basketball State Championship. He was named District Coach of the Year and also was named Prairie View Interscholastic League 5A Coach of the Year in 2010, as well as State 5A Coach of the Year. In 2011, Coach Courtney was named Texas High School Coaches Association South All-Star Coach.

Coach Courtney has been at Bush for eleven years and his record at Bush is 314–72; his overall high school record after 26 years is 551–192. His total head coaching record of high school and college is 628–290.

In 2013, Coach Courtney was named Texas Association Basketball Coaches (TABC) All-Star Coach, where he led the 4A-5A White team to a 122–109 victory over the 4A-5A Blue team. As a highlight of Coach Courtney's many accomplishments and achievements, he recently received the distinct honor as an inductee into the Prairie View Interscholastic League Coaches Association 2015 Hall of Fame.

Coach Courtney's accomplishments with his teams pale in comparison to the impact he has made on the lives of the young men he has coached. A few lives he has touched include T.J. Ford former lottery pick of the Milwaukee Bucks, Daniel Ewing, drafted by the Los Angeles Clippers, Ivan McFarland, drafted by the Philadelphia Seventy Sixers, Carl Crawford, drafted by the Tampa Bay Rays.

On October 18, 2020, Courtney was named the head boys basketball coach at Fort Bend Marshall High School (Missouri City Texas).
