= Robert Moreland (basketball) =

American basketball coach (1938–2024)

Biographical details
- Born: November 10, 1938; Utica, Mississippi, U.S.
- Died: July 29, 2024 (aged 85); Houston, Texas, U.S.
- Education: Tougaloo

Coaching career (HC unless noted)
- 1962–1963: Greer HS
- 1963–1975: Utica JC
- 1975–2001: Texas Southern
- 2007–2008: Texas Southern (interim)

Head coaching record
- Overall: 406–377 (.519)
- Tournaments: 0–3 (NCAA Division I)

Accomplishments and honors

Championships
- NAIA Championship (1977); 3 SWAC tournament (1990, 1994, 1995); 6 SWAC regular season (1983, 1989, 1992, 1994, 1995, 1998)

Awards
- 5× SWAC Coach of the Year

Robert Earl Moreland Sr. (November 10, 1938 – July 29, 2024) was an American college basketball coach. He served as the head coach of the Texas Southern Tigers from 1975 to 2001, and as interim head coach during the 2007–08 season. Moreland has the most wins as a coach in Tigers history with 406. Moreland led the Tigers to a NAIA championship in 1977 and was named the Southwestern Athletic Conference (SWAC) Coach of the Year five times.

== Early life ==
Moreland was born in Utica, Mississippi, as the youngest of eleven children to Hizzie Moreland and Hattie Morris-Moreland. He attended Hinds County Agricultural High School and Utica Junior College. He received an athletic scholarship to Tougaloo College where he participated in basketball, football and track and field. Moreland graduated from Tougaloo in 1962.

== Coaching career ==
Moreland began his coaching career at Greer High School in Carthage, Mississippi, during the 1962–63 season. Moreland served as head coach of the basketball team at Utica Junior College from 1963 to 1975. He was appointed head coach of the Texas Southern Tigers in 1975 by athletic director Rod Paige, who had first met when Moreland was a high school student and Paige was practice teaching at his school. Moreland led the Tigers to the NCAA tournament in 1990, 1994 and 1995.

Moreland was fired as head coach by the Tigers in 2001 but remained as a professor at Texas Southern University. He returned to the Tigers as an interim head coach for the 2007–08 season and accumulated a 7–25 record during his final season of coaching.

The Tigers renamed the basketball court of Health and Physical Education Arena in Moreland's honor. He was named to the SWAC Hall of Fame in 2007. Moreland was inducted into the Texas Southern University Sports Hall of Fame in 2024.

== Personal life ==
Moreland married Victoria Pearson in 1958 and they had three children together. He also had a fourth child.

Moreland died on July 29, 2024, aged 85, in Houston, Texas.
