= Grambling, Louisiana =

- City
- City of Grambling
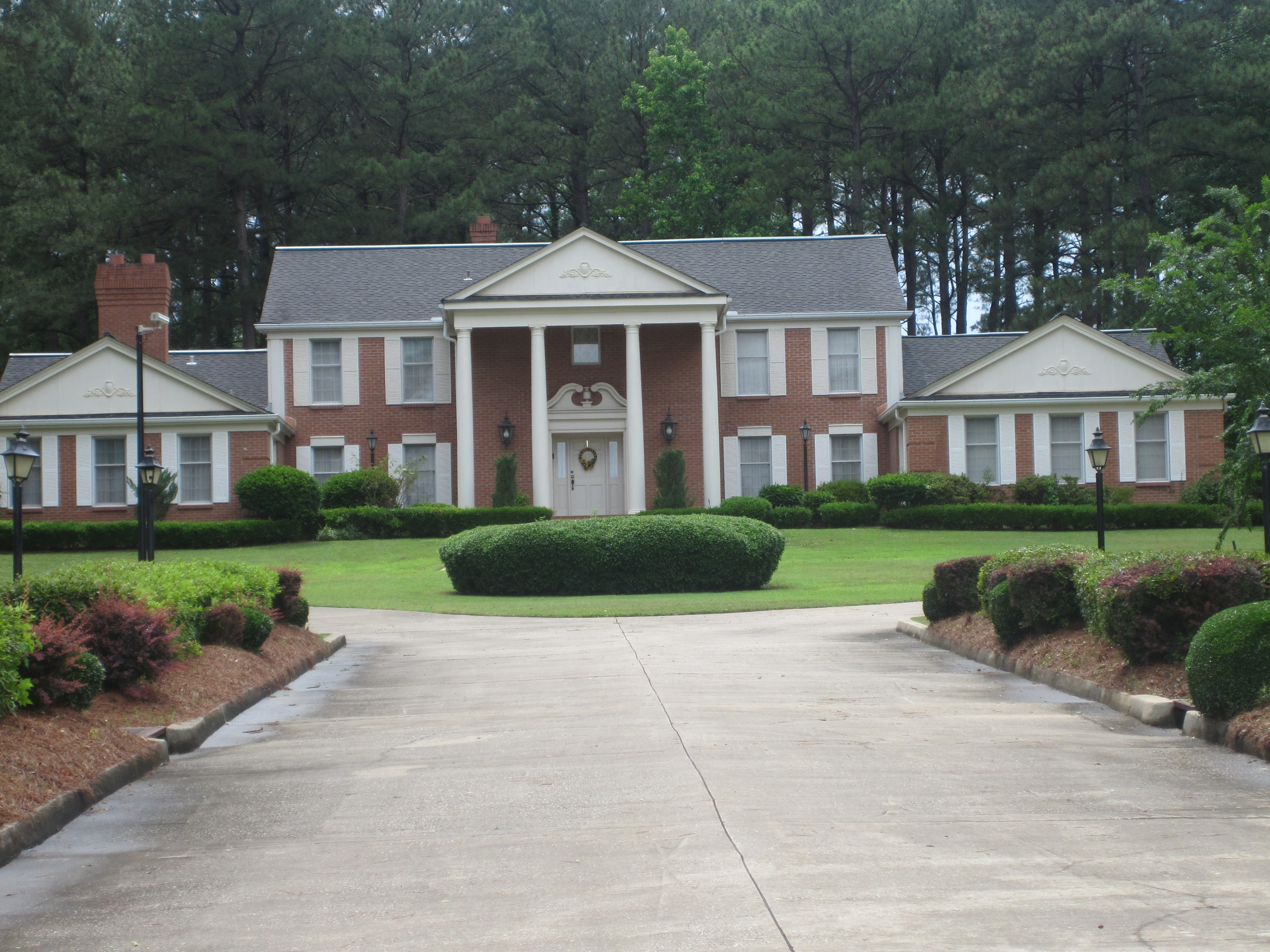
- University President's Home at Grambling State University

- Location of Grambling in Lincoln Parish, Louisiana.

- Location within Louisiana
- Coordinates: 32°31′39″N 92°42′44″W
- Country: United States
- State: Louisiana
- Parish: Lincoln
- Incorporated (city): 1992

Area
  - Total: 5.92 sq mi (15.34 km^{2})
  - Land: 5.90 sq mi (15.29 km^{2})
  - Water: 0.023 sq mi (0.06 km^{2})
- Elevation: 302 ft (92 m)

Population (2020)
  - Total: 5,239
  - Density: 887.6/sq mi (342.69/km^{2})
- Time zone: UTC-6 (CST)
  - Summer (DST): UTC-5 (CDT)
- ZIP code: 71245
- Area code: 318
- FIPS code: 22-30515
- GNIS feature ID: 2403723
- Website: cityofgrambling.org

Grambling is a city in Lincoln Parish, Louisiana, United States. The population was 5,239 in 2020. The city is home to Grambling State University and is part of the Ruston micropolitan statistical area.

Grambling was designated a "city" in the early 1990s (either in 1992 or 1993), but was erroneously considered a "town" during the 2000 census.

The city is named after P. G. Grambling.

== Geography ==
Grambling is located at 32°31′39″N 92°42′50″W (32.527427, -92.713987).

According to the United States Census Bureau, the city has a total area of 5.5 square miles (14 km^{2}), of which 5.5 square miles (14 km^{2}) is land and 0.04 square miles (0.10 km^{2}) (0.36%) is water.

== Demographics ==
Historical population
Census	Pop.	Note	%±
1960	3,144		—
1970	4,407		40.2%
1980	4,226		−4.1%
1990	5,484		29.8%
2000	4,693		−14.4%
2010	4,949		5.5%
2020	5,239		5.9%
2025 (est.)	5,314	▲	1.4%
U.S. Decennial Census

=== 2020 census ===
As of the 2020 census, Grambling had a population of 5,239. The median age was 21.7 years. 13.8% of residents were under the age of 18 and 8.4% of residents were 65 years of age or older. For every 100 females, there were 69.1 males, and for every 100 females age 18 and over, there were 63.4 males age 18 and over.

89.9% of residents lived in urban areas, while 10.1% lived in rural areas.

There were 1,272 households in Grambling, of which 31.5% had children under the age of 18 living in them. Of all households, 21.9% were married-couple households, 24.6% were households with a male householder and no spouse or partner present, and 48.7% were households with a female householder and no spouse or partner present. About 35.2% of all households were made up of individuals, and 12.0% had someone living alone who was 65 years of age or older. There were 1,118 families residing in the city.

There were 1,522 housing units, of which 16.4% were vacant. The homeowner vacancy rate was 3.9%, and the rental vacancy rate was 12.5%.

Grambling racial composition as of 2020
Race	Number	Percentage
White (non-Hispanic)	30	0.57%
Black or African American (non-Hispanic)	5,054	96.47%
Native American	6	0.11%
Asian	6	0.11%
Other/Mixed	107	2.04%
Hispanic or Latino	36	0.69%

== Arts and culture ==
- Grambling Memorial Gardens
- Eddie G. Robinson Museum

== Education ==
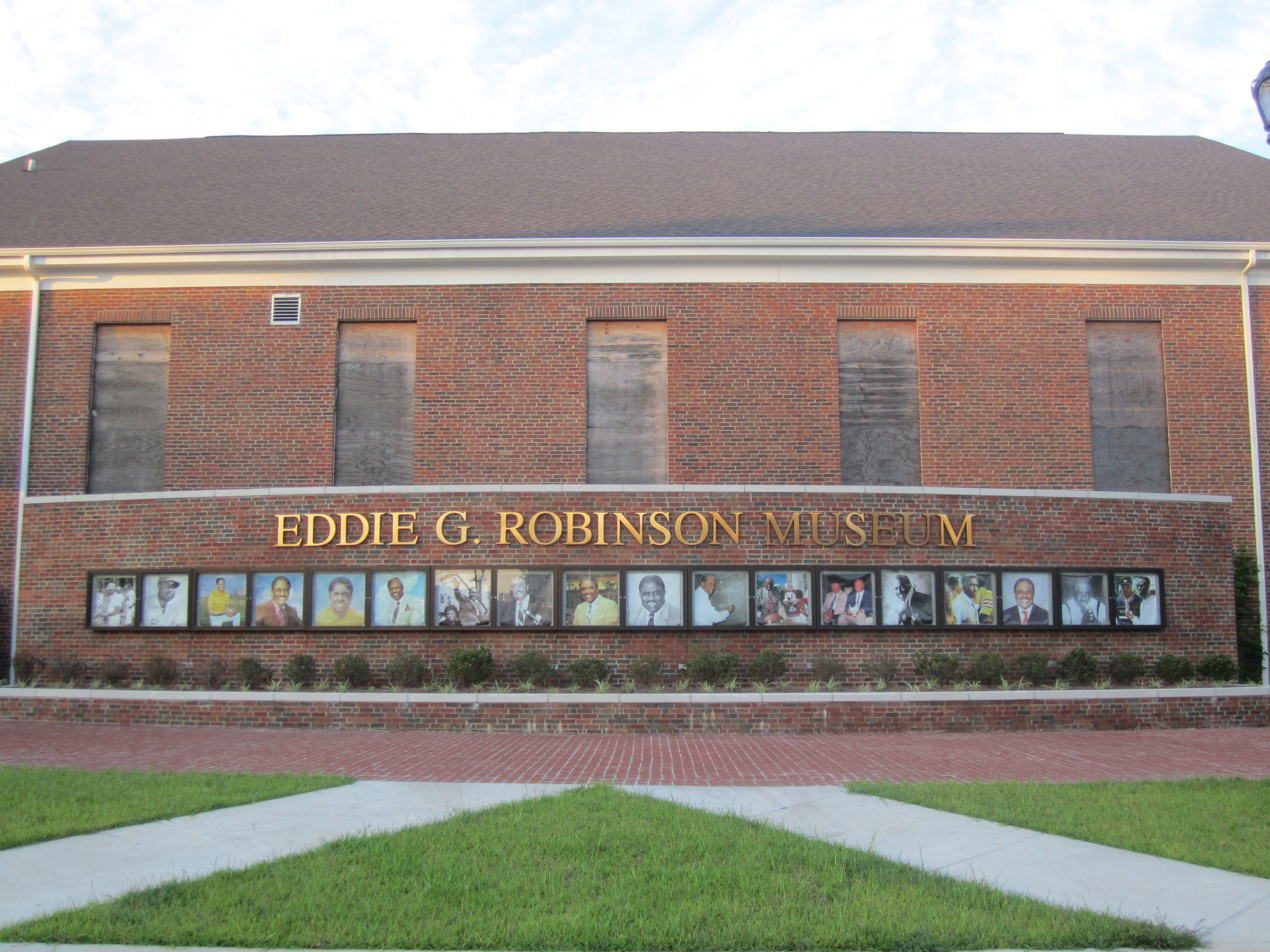
Eddie G. Robinson Museum at Grambling State University

The city is home to Grambling State University, a public, coeducational, and historically black university founded in 1901 and accredited in 1949.

Lincoln Preparatory School is a charter school located in Grambling that serves (Grades K-12).

== Notable people ==
- Edward H. Adams (1910–1958), basketball player and coach
- Jophery Brown (1945–2014), stuntman and Chicago Cubs pitcher, born in Grambling
- Ralph Garr (born 1945), baseball player, attended Grambling College
- Paul Millsap (born 1985), former professional basketball player
- Eddie Robinson (1919–2007), head football coach at Grambling
- Doug Williams (born 1955), NFL player and head football coach at Grambling
- Paul "Tank" Younger (1928–2001), National Football League (NFL) player

== Highways ==
- Interstate =
- U.S. =
- Louisiana =
