= 1979–80 NCAA Division I men's basketball season =

Basketball season

- Preseason AP No. 1: Indiana Hoosiers
- NCAA Tournament: 1980
- Tournament dates: March 6 – 24, 1980
- National Championship: Market Square Arena; Indianapolis, Indiana
- NCAA Champions: Louisville Cardinals
- Helms National Champions: Louisville Cardinals
- Other champions: Virginia Cavaliers (NIT)
- Player of the Year (Naismith, Wooden): Mark Aguirre, DePaul Blue Demons (Naismith); Darrell Griffith, Louisville Cardinals (Wooden)
- Player of the Year (Helms): Darrell Griffith, Louisville Cardinals

The 1979–80 NCAA Division I men's basketball season began on November 17, 1979, progressed through the regular season and conference tournaments, and concluded with the 1980 NCAA Division I men's basketball tournament championship game on March 24, 1980, at the Market Square Arena in Indianapolis. The Louisville Cardinals won their first NCAA national championship with a 59–54 victory over the UCLA Bruins.

== Rule changes ==
- Officials were ordered to more strictly enforce foul rules already on the books, including bench decorum, hand-checking and charging fouls.
- Any mistaken attempt to call a time-out after a team runs out of time-outs results in a technical foul and two free throws for the opposing team. The rule would figure prominently in the outcome of the 1993 NCAA Division I men's basketball tournament.

== Season headlines ==
- ESPN launched on September 7, 1979, as the first all-sports television network and began televising college basketball in November. It took advantage of college basketball's rapidly growing popularity to begin a highly profitable relationship with the NCAA which greatly expanded television coverage of college basketball in the United States.
- The basketball-centered original Big East Conference began play. Working closely with ESPN, it rapidly developed a reputation as a powerhouse of college basketball and a dominating force in the sport.
- The ECAC North Conference began play, with 10 original members. It was renamed the North Atlantic Conference in 1988 and the America East Conference in 1996.
- The ECAC South Conference was founded, consisting of schools that participated in the Eastern College Athletic Conference's Division I ECAC South tournaments for independents. The ECAC South did not play as a conference until the 1981–82 season; in the meantime, its members continued compete as independents during the regular season and seek a bid to the NCAA tournament via the ECAC's regional tournament. The conference was renamed the Colonial Athletic Association in 1985 and the Coastal Athletic Association in 2023.
- The Midwestern City Conference began play, with six original members. It was renamed the Midwestern Collegiate Conference in 1985 and the Horizon League in 2001.
- The National Invitation Tournament expanded from 24 to 32 teams.
- The NCAA tournament expanded from 40 to 48 teams. For the first time, more than two teams from each conference could be selected for the tournament. The NCAA also instituted the "round-robin rule," requiring a conference to play either a single-round-robin regular-season format and a conference tournament or a double-round-robin regular-season format to be eligible for an automatic bid to the NCAA Tournament. The expanded access of conference members to tournament bids combined with the "round-robin rule" made it difficult for Division I independents — most of which were located in the Northeastern United States — to get a tournament bid, greatly accelerating the decline in the number of independents, a decline which had begun in the 1974–75 season when the NCAA allowed more than one team per conference into the tournament for the first time. The Big East Conference formed as a result of the new tournament access requirements, and additional conferences would form by 1981.
- ESPN televised 23 games of the 1980 NCAA tournament, becoming the first television network to broadcast the early rounds of an NCAA Tournament.
- For the first time, none of the No. 1 seeds in the NCAA tournament advanced to the Final Four.
- Louisville's "doctors of dunk" brought Denny Crum his first NCAA title with a 59–54 win over surprise finalist UCLA and coach Larry Brown. Wooden Award winner Darrell Griffith was named Final Four Most Outstanding Player.
- The first year of the Ralph Sampson era ended with a Virginia Cavaliers National Invitation Tournament championship – a 58–55 win over Minnesota. Sampson, a 7-foot-4-inch (224 cm) freshman center, was named the tournament's Most Valuable Player.

== Season outlook ==
=== Pre-season polls ===
The top 20 from the AP Poll and UPI Coaches Poll during the pre-season.

'Associated Press'
Ranking	Team
1	Indiana (28)
2	Kentucky (5)
3	Duke (18)
4	Ohio State (7)
5	Notre Dame (1)
6	North Carolina
7	Louisiana State
8	UCLA
9	DePaul
10	Louisville
11	Purdue
12	Syracuse
13	Virginia
14	Texas A&M
15	Brigham Young
16	St. John's
17	Oregon State
18	Marquette
19	Georgetown
20	Kansas

UPI Coaches
Ranking	Team
1	Indiana
2	Ohio State
3	Notre Dame
4	North Carolina
5	Kentucky
6	Duke
7	UCLA
8	Louisiana State
9	DePaul
9	Virginia
11	Purdue
12	Syracuse
13	Texas A&M
14	Louisville
15	St. John's
16	Oregon State
17	Brigham Young
18	Iowa
19	Marquette
20	UNLV

== Conference membership changes ==
School	Former conference	New conference
Boston College Eagles	Division I independent	Big East Conference
Boston University Terriers	Division I independent	ECAC North Conference
Butler Bulldogs	Division I independent	Midwestern City Conference
Canisius Golden Griffins	Division I independent	ECAC North Conference
Colgate Raiders	Division I independent	ECAC North Conference
Connecticut Huskies	Division I independent	Big East Conference
Denver Pioneers	Division I independent	NAIA independent
East Tennessee State Buccaneers	Division I independent	Southern Conference
Evansville Purple Aces	Division I independent	Midwestern City Conference
Florida A&M Rattlers	SIAC (D-II)	Mid-Eastern Athletic Conference
Georgetown Hoyas	Division I independent	Big East Conference
Georgia Tech Yellow Jackets	Division I independent	Atlantic Coast Conference
Gonzaga Bulldogs	Big Sky Conference	West Coast Athletic Conference
Hawaiʻi Rainbow Warriors	Division I independent	Western Athletic Conference
Holy Cross Crusaders	Division I independent	ECAC North Conference
Loyola Chicago Ramblers	Division I independent	Midwestern City Conference
Maine Black Bears	Division I independent	ECAC North Conference
Nevada Wolf Pack	West Coast Athletic Conference	Big Sky Conference
New Hampshire Wildcats	Division I independent	ECAC North Conference
Niagara Purple Eagles	Division I independent	ECAC North Conference
Northeastern Huskies	Division I independent	ECAC North Conference
Oklahoma City Chiefs	Trans America Athletic Conference	Midwestern City Conference
Oral Roberts Titans	Division I independent	Midwestern City Conference
Penn State Nittany Lions	Eastern Athletic Association (Eastern 8)	Division I independent
Providence Friars	Division I independent	Big East Conference
Rhode Island Rams	Division I independent	ECAC North Conference
St. Bonaventure Brown Indians	Division I independent	Eastern Athletic Association (Eastern 8)
St. John's Redmen	Division I independent	Big East Conference
San Diego Toreros	Division II independent	West Coast Athletic Conference
Seton Hall Pirates	Division I independent	Big East Conference
Syracuse Orangemen	Division I independent	Big East Conference
Towson State Tigers	Division II independent	Division I independent
UAB Blazers	Division I independent	Sun Belt Conference
Vermont Catamounts	Division I independent	ECAC North Conference
VCU Rams	Division I independent	Sun Belt Conference
Xavier Musketeers	Division I independent	Midwestern City Conference

== Regular season ==
=== Conferences ===
==== Conference winners and tournaments ====
The Mid-Eastern Athletic Conference — with members Delaware State, Howard, North Carolina A&T, and South Carolina State — became a Division I conference this season. Maryland Eastern Shore, Morgan State, and North Carolina Central opted not to reclassify with the conference and remained in Division II.

Conference	Regular season winner	Conference player of the year	Conference tournament	Tournament venue (City)	Tournament winner
Atlantic Coast Conference	Maryland	Albert King, Maryland	1980 ACC men's basketball tournament	Greensboro Coliseum (Greensboro, North Carolina)	Duke
Big East Conference	Georgetown, St. John's & Syracuse	John Duren, Georgetown	1980 Big East men's basketball tournament	Providence Civic Center (Providence, Rhode Island)	Georgetown
Big Eight Conference	Missouri	Rolando Blackman, Kansas State	1980 Big Eight Conference men's basketball tournament	Kemper Arena (Kansas City, Missouri) (Semifinals and Finals)	Kansas State
Big Sky Conference	Weber State	Don Newman, Idaho	1980 Big Sky Conference men's basketball tournament	Dee Events Center (Ogden, Utah)	Weber State
Big Ten Conference	Indiana	None Selected	No Tournament		
East Coast Conference	St. Joseph's (East); Lafayette (West)	Michael Brooks, La Salle	1980 East Coast Conference men's basketball tournament	The Palestra (Philadelphia)	La Salle
Eastern Athletic Association (Eastern 8)	Villanova, Duquesne & Rutgers	Earl Belcher, St. Bonaventure	1980 Eastern 8 men's basketball tournament	Civic Arena (Pittsburgh)	Villanova
Eastern College Athletic; Conference (ECAC)	Division I ECAC members played as independents during the regular season (see note)		1980 ECAC Metro men's basketball tournament	Nassau Coliseum (Uniondale, New York)	Iona
Eastern College Athletic; Conference (ECAC)	Division I ECAC members played as independents during the regular season (see note)		1980 ECAC South men's basketball tournament	Hampton Coliseum (Hampton, Virginia)	Old Dominion
ECAC North	Boston University & Northeastern	Rufus Harris, Maine & Ron Perry, Holy Cross	1980 ECAC North men's basketball tournament	Hart Center (Worcester, Massachusetts)	Holy Cross
Ivy League	Penn	Peter Moss, Brown	No Tournament		
Metro Conference	Louisville	Darrell Griffith, Louisville	1980 Metro Conference men's basketball tournament	Freedom Hall (Louisville, Kentucky)	Louisville
Mid-American Conference	Toledo	Jim Swaney, Toledo	1980 MAC men's basketball tournament	Crisler Arena (Ann Arbor, Michigan)	Toledo
Mid-Eastern Athletic Conference	Howard	James Ratiff, Howard	1980 MEAC men's basketball tournament	Greensboro Coliseum (Greensboro, North Carolina)	Howard
Midwestern City Conference	Loyola (IL)	Calvin Garrett, Oral Roberts	1980 Midwestern City Conference men's basketball tournament	Roberts Municipal Stadium (Evansville, Indiana)	Oral Roberts
Missouri Valley Conference	Bradley	Lewis Lloyd, Drake	1980 Missouri Valley Conference men's basketball tournament	Robertson Memorial Field House (Peoria, Illinois)	Bradley
Ohio Valley Conference	Murray State & Western Kentucky	Gary Hooker, Murray State	1980 Ohio Valley Conference men's basketball tournament	E. A. Diddle Arena (Bowling Green, Kentucky)	Western Kentucky
Pacific-10 Conference	Oregon State	Don Collins, Washington State	No Tournament		
Pacific Coast Athletic Association	Utah State	Dean Hunger, Utah State	1980 PCAA men's basketball tournament	Anaheim Convention Center (Anaheim, California)	San Jose State
Southeastern Conference	Kentucky	Kyle Macy, Kentucky	1980 SEC men's basketball tournament	Birmingham Jefferson Convention Complex (Birmingham, Alabama)	LSU
Southern Conference	Furman	Jonathan Moore, Furman	1980 Southern Conference men's basketball tournament	Roanoke Civic Center (Roanoke, Virginia)	Furman
Southland Conference	Lamar	Andrew Toney, Southwestern Louisiana	No Tournament		
Southwest Conference	Texas A&M	Terry Teagle, Baylor	1980 Southwest Conference men's basketball tournament	HemisFair Arena (San Antonio, Texas)	Texas A&M
Southwestern Athletic Conference	Alcorn State	Larry Smith, Alcorn State	1980 SWAC men's basketball tournament		Alcorn State
Sun Belt Conference	South Alabama	James Ray, Jacksonville	1980 Sun Belt Conference men's basketball tournament	Charlotte Coliseum (Charlotte, North Carolina) (Semifinals and Finals)	VCU
Trans America Athletic Conference	Northeast Louisiana	George Lett, Centenary	1980 TAAC men's basketball tournament	Ewing Coliseum (Monroe, Louisiana)	Centenary
West Coast Athletic Conference	St. Mary's & San Francisco	Kurt Rambis, Santa Clara	No Tournament		
Western Athletic Conference	BYU	None Selected	No Tournament		

Note: From 1975 to 1981, the Eastern College Athletic Conference (ECAC), a loosely organized sports federation of colleges and universities in the Northeastern United States, organized Division I ECAC regional tournaments for those of its members that were independents in basketball. Each 1980 tournament winner received an automatic bid to the 1980 NCAA Division I men's basketball tournament in the same way that the tournament champions of conventional athletic conferences did. The ECAC North was a separate, conventional conference.

==== Conference standings ====
1979–80 ACC men's basketball standings
	Conf.				Overall
Team	W		L	PCT	W		L	PCT
No. 8 Maryland	11	–	3	.786	24	–	7	.774
No. 15 North Carolina	9	–	5	.643	21	–	8	.724
NC State	9	–	5	.643	20	–	8	.714
Clemson	8	–	6	.571	23	–	9	.719
Virginia	7	–	7	.500	24	–	10	.706
No. 14 Duke †	7	–	7	.500	24	–	9	.727
Wake Forest	4	–	10	.286	13	–	14	.481
Georgia Tech	1	–	13	.071	8	–	18	.308
† 1980 ACC tournament winner Rankings from AP Poll

1979–80 Big East men's basketball standings
	Conf.				Overall
Team	W		L	PCT	W		L	PCT
No. 6 Syracuse	5	–	1	.833	26	–	4	.867
No. 13 St. John's	5	–	1	.833	24	–	5	.828
No. 11 Georgetown†	5	–	1	.833	26	–	6	.813
Connecticut	3	–	3	.500	20	–	9	.690
Boston College	2	–	4	.333	19	–	10	.655
Seton Hall	1	–	5	.167	14	–	13	.519
Providence	0	–	6	.000	11	–	16	.407
† 1980 Big East tournament winner Rankings from AP poll

1979–80 Big Eight Conference men's basketball standings
	Conf.				Overall
Team	W		L	PCT	W		L	PCT
No. 16 Missouri	11	–	3	.786	25	–	6	.806
Kansas State †	8	–	6	.571	22	–	9	.710
Nebraska	8	–	6	.571	18	–	13	.581
Kansas	7	–	7	.500	15	–	14	.517
Colorado	7	–	7	.500	17	–	10	.630
Oklahoma	6	–	8	.429	15	–	12	.556
Iowa State	5	–	9	.357	11	–	16	.407
Oklahoma State	4	–	10	.286	10	–	17	.370
† 1980 Big Eight tournament winner Rankings from AP Poll

1979–80 Big Sky men's basketball standings
	Conf.				Overall
Team	W		L	PCT	W		L	PCT
No. 17 Weber State †	13	–	1	.929	26	–	3	.897
Idaho	9	–	5	.643	17	–	10	.630
Montana	8	–	6	.571	17	–	11	.607
Montana State	7	–	7	.500	14	–	12	.538
Nevada	5	–	9	.357	10	–	19	.345
Idaho State	5	–	9	.357	9	–	17	.346
Northern Arizona	5	–	9	.357	14	–	12	.538
Boise State	4	–	10	.286	10	–	16	.385
† Conference tournament winner Rankings from AP poll

1979–80 Big Ten Conference men's basketball standings
	Conf.				Overall
Team	W		L	PCT	W		L	PCT
No. 7 Indiana	13	–	5	.722	21	–	8	.724
No. 10 Ohio State	12	–	6	.667	21	–	8	.724
No. 20 Purdue	11	–	7	.611	23	–	10	.697
Iowa	10	–	8	.556	23	–	10	.697
Minnesota	10	–	8	.556	21	–	11	.656
Illinois	8	–	10	.444	22	–	13	.629
Michigan	8	–	10	.444	17	–	13	.567
Wisconsin	7	–	11	.389	15	–	14	.517
Michigan State	6	–	12	.333	12	–	15	.444
Northwestern	5	–	13	.278	10	–	17	.370
Rankings from AP Poll

1979–80 ECAC North men's basketball standings
	Conf.				Overall
Team	W		L	PCT	W		L	PCT
Boston University	19	–	7	.731	21	–	9	.700
Northeastern	19	–	7	.731	19	–	8	.704
Holy Cross †	16	–	10	.615	19	–	11	.633
Rhode Island	14	–	12	.538	15	–	13	.536
Maine	14	–	12	.538	15	–	13	.536
Canisius	13	–	13	.500	13	–	14	.481
Vermont	4	–	4	.500	12	–	15	.444
Niagara	11	–	15	.423	11	–	16	.407
Colgate	8	–	17	.320	8	–	17	.320
New Hampshire	4	–	22	.154	4	–	22	.154
† 1980 ECAC North tournament winner

1979–80 ECC men's basketball standings
	Conf.				Overall
Team	W		L	PCT	W		L	PCT
East
Saint Joseph's	10	–	1	.909	21	–	9	.700
Temple	8	–	3	.727	14	–	12	.538
La Salle †	7	–	4	.636	22	–	9	.710
Hofstra	6	–	5	.545	14	–	14	.500
American	5	–	6	.455	13	–	14	.481
Drexel	4	–	7	.364	12	–	15	.444
West
Lafayette	13	–	3	.813	21	–	8	.724
Bucknell	13	–	3	.813	20	–	7	.741
Delaware	7	–	9	.438	9	–	19	.321
Rider	5	–	11	.313	10	–	18	.357
Lehigh	2	–	14	.125	5	–	20	.200
West Chester	1	–	15	.063	3	–	23	.115
† 1980 ECC tournament winner Rankings from AP poll

1979–80 Eastern 8 men's basketball standings
	Conf.				Overall
Team	W		L	PCT	W		L	PCT
Villanova †	7	–	3	.700	23	–	8	.742
Duquesne	7	–	3	.700	18	–	10	.643
Rutgers	7	–	3	.700	14	–	14	.500
St. Bonaventure	5	–	5	.500	16	–	11	.593
Pittsburgh	5	–	5	.500	17	–	12	.586
George Washington	5	–	5	.500	15	–	11	.577
West Virginia	4	–	6	.400	15	–	14	.517
UMass	0	–	10	.000	2	–	24	.077
† 1980 Eastern 8 Tournament winner Rankings from AP Poll

1979–80 Ivy League men's basketball standings
	Conf.				Overall
Team	W		L	PCT	W		L	PCT
Penn	11	–	3	.786	17	–	12	.586
Princeton	11	–	3	.786	15	–	15	.500
Brown	9	–	5	.643	12	–	14	.462
Yale	8	–	6	.571	16	–	10	.615
Harvard	6	–	8	.429	11	–	15	.423
Columbia	5	–	9	.357	10	–	16	.385
Dartmouth	3	–	11	.214	6	–	20	.231
Cornell	3	–	11	.214	5	–	19	.208
Rankings from AP Poll

1979–80 Metro Conference men's basketball standings
	Conf.				Overall
Team	W		L	PCT	W		L	PCT
No. 2 Louisville †	12	–	0	1.000	33	–	3	.917
Virginia Tech	8	–	4	.667	21	–	8	.724
Florida State	7	–	5	.583	22	–	9	.710
Memphis State	5	–	7	.417	13	–	14	.481
Saint Louis	4	–	8	.333	12	–	15	.444
Cincinnati	3	–	9	.250	13	–	15	.464
Tulane	3	–	9	.250	10	–	17	.370
† 1980 Metro Conference tournament winner Rankings from AP Poll

1979–80 Mid-American Conference men's basketball standings
	Conf.				Overall
Team	W		L	PCT	W		L	PCT
Toledo †	14	–	2	.875	23	–	6	.793
Bowling Green State	11	–	5	.688	20	–	10	.667
Northern Illinois	9	–	7	.563	16	–	13	.552
Kent State	7	–	9	.438	16	–	11	.593
Ball State	7	–	9	.438	14	–	15	.483
Miami (Ohio)	7	–	9	.438	9	–	18	.333
Eastern Michigan	7	–	9	.438	11	–	16	.407
Western Michigan	7	–	9	.438	12	–	14	.462
Central Michigan	6	–	10	.375	12	–	13	.480
Ohio	5	–	11	.313	8	–	18	.308
† 1980 MAC tournament winner Rankings from AP Poll

1979–80 Midwestern City Conference men's basketball standings
	Conf.				Overall
Team	W		L	PCT	W		L	PCT
Loyola-Chicago	5	–	0	1.000	19	–	10	.655
Oral Roberts †	4	–	1	.800	18	–	10	.643
Oklahoma City	3	–	2	.600	13	–	15	.464
Butler	2	–	3	.400	12	–	15	.444
Evansville	1	–	4	.200	18	–	10	.643
Xavier	0	–	5	.000	8	–	18	.308
† 1980 MCC tournament winner

1979–80 Missouri Valley Conference men's basketball standings
	Conf.				Overall
Team	W		L	PCT	W		L	PCT
Bradley †	13	–	3	.813	23	–	10	.697
Creighton	9	–	7	.563	16	–	12	.571
West Texas State	9	–	7	.563	19	–	11	.633
Wichita State	9	–	7	.563	17	–	12	.586
Indiana State	8	–	8	.500	16	–	11	.593
New Mexico State	8	–	8	.500	17	–	10	.630
Drake	6	–	10	.375	15	–	12	.556
Tulsa	5	–	11	.313	8	–	19	.296
Southern Illinois	5	–	11	.313	9	–	17	.346
† 1980 MVC tournament winner Rankings from AP Poll

1979–80 Ohio Valley Conference men's basketball standings
	Conf.				Overall
Team	W		L	PCT	W		L	PCT
Western Kentucky †	10	–	2	.833	21	–	8	.724
Murray State	10	–	2	.833	23	–	8	.742
Morehead State	7	–	5	.583	15	–	12	.556
Eastern Kentucky	7	–	5	.583	15	–	12	.556
Middle Tennessee	5	–	7	.417	13	–	13	.500
Austin Peay State	2	–	10	.167	8	–	18	.308
Tennessee Tech	1	–	11	.083	5	–	21	.192
† 1980 OVC tournament winner Rankings from AP poll

1979–80 Pacific-10 Conference men's basketball standings
	Conf.				Overall
Team	W		L	PCT	W		L	PCT
^#5 Oregon State	16	–	2	.889	26	–	3	.897
No. 18 Arizona State	15	–	3	.833	22	–	7	.759
Washington State	14	–	4	.778	22	–	6	.786
*UCLA	12	–	6	.667	17	–	9	.654
Washington	9	–	9	.500	18	–	10	.643
Arizona	6	–	12	.333	12	–	15	.444
USC	5	–	13	.278	12	–	15	.444
Oregon	5	–	13	.278	10	–	17	.370
Stanford	5	–	13	.278	7	–	19	.269
California	3	–	15	.167	8	–	19	.296
As of April 15, 1980; *Oregon State vacated all tournament games (0–1) due to NCAA sanctions. Disputed record (16-2, 26-4)^UCLA vacated all tournament games (5–1) due to NCAA sanctions. Disputed record (22-10, 12-6); Rankings from AP Poll

1979–80 Pacific Coast Athletic Association men's basketball standings
	Conf.				Overall
Team	W		L	PCT	W		L	PCT
Utah State	11	–	2	.846	18	–	9	.667
Long Beach State	11	–	3	.786	22	–	12	.647
Fresno State	8	–	4	.667	17	–	7	.708
San Jose State†	7	–	6	.538	17	–	12	.586
Pacific	7	–	7	.500	15	–	16	.484
UC Santa Barbara (Note: Wins vacated by PCAA but still recognized by NCAA.)	5	–	9	.357	11	–	16	.407
Cal State Fullerton	4	–	10	.286	10	–	17	.370
UC Irvine (Note: UC Irvine claims two losses against UC Santa Barbara that were vacated by PCAA as wins.)	1	–	13	.071	9	–	18	.333
† 1980 PCAA tournament winner

1979–80 Southeastern Conference men's basketball standings
	Conf.				Overall
Team	W		L	PCT	W		L	PCT
No. 4 Kentucky	15	–	3	.833	29	–	6	.829
No. 3 LSU †	14	–	4	.778	26	–	6	.813
Alabama	12	–	6	.667	18	–	12	.600
Tennessee	12	–	6	.667	18	–	11	.621
Ole Miss	9	–	9	.500	17	–	13	.567
Mississippi State	7	–	11	.389	13	–	14	.481
Vanderbilt	7	–	11	.389	13	–	13	.500
Georgia	7	–	11	.389	14	–	13	.519
Auburn	5	–	13	.278	10	–	18	.357
Florida	2	–	16	.111	7	–	21	.250
† 1980 SEC tournament winner Rankings from AP Poll

1979–80 Southern Conference men's basketball standings
	Conf.				Overall
Team	W		L	PCT	W		L	PCT
Furman †	14	–	1	.933	23	–	7	.767
Marshall	10	–	6	.625	17	–	12	.586
Western Carolina	9	–	7	.563	17	–	10	.630
East Tennessee State	8	–	7	.533	15	–	13	.536
Chattanooga	7	–	9	.438	13	–	14	.481
Appalachian State	6	–	10	.375	12	–	16	.429
The Citadel	6	–	10	.375	14	–	13	.519
VMI	6	–	10	.375	11	–	16	.407
Davidson	4	–	11	.267	8	–	18	.308
† 1980 Southern Conference Tournament winner Rankings from AP poll

1979–80 Southland Conference men's basketball standings
	Conf.				Overall
Team	W		L	PCT	W		L	PCT
Lamar	8	–	2	.800	22	–	11	.667
Southwestern Louisiana	5	–	5	.500	21	–	9	.700
Arkansas State	5	–	5	.500	15	–	12	.556
McNeese State	5	–	5	.500	15	–	12	.556
Louisiana Tech	4	–	6	.400	17	–	10	.630
Texas-Arlington	3	–	7	.300	14	–	13	.519
Rankings from AP Poll

1979–80 Southwest Conference men's basketball standings
	Conf.				Overall
Team	W		L	PCT	W		L	PCT
Texas A&M †	14	–	2	.875	26	–	8	.765
Arkansas	13	–	3	.813	21	–	8	.724
Texas	10	–	6	.625	19	–	11	.633
Texas Tech	8	–	8	.500	16	–	13	.552
Houston	8	–	8	.500	14	–	14	.500
SMU	7	–	9	.438	16	–	12	.571
Baylor	6	–	10	.375	11	–	16	.407
Rice	4	–	12	.250	7	–	19	.269
TCU	2	–	14	.125	7	–	19	.269
† 1980 SWC tournament winner Rankings from AP Poll

1979–80 SWAC men's basketball standings
	Conf.				Overall
Team	W		L	PCT	W		L	PCT
Alcorn State †	8	–	0	1.000	28	–	2	.933
Grambling	6	–	4	.600	22	–	8	.733
Jackson State	3	–	5	.375	15	–	14	.517
Southern	3	–	6	.333	14	–	15	.483
Texas Southern	2	–	7	.222	9	–	17	.346
Prairie View		–		–	10	–	18	.357
Mississippi Valley State		–		–	3	–	24	.111
† 1980 SWAC tournament winner Rankings from AP Poll

1979–80 Sun Belt Conference men's basketball standings
	Conf.				Overall
Team	W		L	PCT	W		L	PCT
South Alabama	12	–	2	.857	23	–	6	.793
UAB	10	–	4	.714	18	–	12	.600
Jacksonville	10	–	4	.714	20	–	9	.690
UNC Charlotte	9	–	5	.643	15	–	12	.556
VCU †	8	–	6	.571	18	–	12	.600
Georgia State	4	–	10	.286	6	–	21	.222
New Orleans	2	–	12	.143	5	–	21	.192
South Florida	1	–	13	.071	6	–	21	.222
† 1980 Sun Belt Conference tournament winner Rankings from AP Poll

1979–80 Trans America Athletic Conference men's basketball standings
	Conf.				Overall
Team	W		L	PCT	W		L	PCT
Northeast Louisiana	6	–	0	1.000	18	–	10	.643
Pan American	4	–	2	.667	19	–	9	.679
Mercer	3	–	3	.500	16	–	12	.571
Centenary†	3	–	3	.500	15	–	14	.517
Samford	3	–	3	.500	8	–	19	.296
Houston Baptist	2	–	4	.333	14	–	13	.519
Hardin–Simmons	0	–	6	.000	5	–	21	.192
† 1980 TAAC tournament winner Rankings from AP poll

1979–80 West Coast Athletic Conference men's basketball standings
	Conf.				Overall
Team	W		L	PCT	W		L	PCT
San Francisco	11	–	5	.688	22	–	7	.759
Loyola Marymount	10	–	6	.625	14	–	14	.500
Pepperdine	9	–	7	.563	17	–	10	.630
Portland	9	–	7	.563	17	–	11	.607
Saint Mary's	9	–	7	.563	13	–	14	.481
Gonzaga	8	–	8	.500	13	–	13	.500
Santa Clara	8	–	8	.500	13	–	14	.481
Seattle	7	–	9	.438	11	–	16	.407
San Diego	1	–	15	.063	5	–	20	.200
Rankings from AP Poll

1979–80 WAC men's basketball standings
	Conf.				Overall
Team	W		L	PCT	W		L	PCT
No. 12 BYU	13	–	1	.929	24	–	5	.828
UTEP	10	–	4	.714	20	–	8	.714
Utah	10	–	4	.714	18	–	10	.643
Wyoming	5	–	9	.357	18	–	10	.643
Colorado State	5	–	9	.357	10	–	17	.370
Hawaii	4	–	10	.286	13	–	14	.481
New Mexico	3	–	11	.214	7	–	21	.250
San Diego State	3	–	11	.214	6	–	21	.222
Rankings from AP Poll

=== Division I independents ===
A total of 47 college teams played as Division I independents. Among them, DePaul (26–2) had both the best winning percentage (.929) and the most wins.

1979–80 NCAA Division I men's basketball independents standings
	Conf.				Overall
Team	W		L	PCT	W		L	PCT
No. 1 DePaul		–		–	26	–	2	.929
No. 19 Iona*		–		–	28	–	4	.875
Old Dominion		–		–	25	–	5	.833
No. 9 Notre Dame		–		–	23	–	8	.742
Tennessee State		–		–	19	–	7	.731
UNLV		–		–	23	–	9	.719
Saint Peter's		–		–	22	–	9	.710
Cleveland State		–		–	18	–	8	.692
James Madison		–		–	18	–	8	.692
Illinois State		–		–	20	–	9	.690
Marquette		–		–	18	–	9	.667
UNC Wilmington		–		–	19	–	10	.655
Penn State		–		–	18	–	10	.643
Southern Mississippi		–		–	17	–	10	.630
Arkansas–Little Rock		–		–	16	–	10	.615
South Carolina		–		–	16	–	11	.593
Campbell		–		–	15	–	12	.556
East Carolina		–		–	15	–	12	.556
Stetson		–		–	15	–	12	.556
Long Island		–		–	14	–	12	.538
Detroit		–		–	14	–	13	.519
Navy		–		–	14	–	13	.519
Wagner		–		–	14	–	13	.519
Siena		–		–	14	–	14	.500
Dayton		–		–	13	–	14	.481
Fairleigh Dickinson		–		–	13	–	14	.481
North Texas State		–		–	13	–	14	.481
Richmond		–		–	13	–	14	.481
Baltimore		–		–	12	–	15	.444
William & Mary		–		–	12	–	15	.444
Fordham**		–		–	12	–	16	.429
St. Francis (Pa.)		–		–	12	–	16	.429
St. Francis (N.Y.)		–		–	11	–	15	.423
Fairfield		–		–	11	–	16	.407
Army		–		–	9	–	17	.346
Milwaukee		–		–	9	–	17	.346
Towson State		–		–	9	–	17	.346
Air Force		–		–	8	–	17	.320
Valparaiso		–		–	8	–	18	.308
Catholic		–		–	8	–	19	.296
Robert Morris		–		–	7	–	19	.269
Northwestern State		–		–	5	–	20	.200
George Mason		–		–	5	–	21	.192
Portland State		–		–	5	–	21	.192
Georgia Southern		–		–	5	–	22	.185
Manhattan		–		–	4	–	22	.154
Baptist		–		–	2	–	23	.080
* –Iona's 1980 NCAA Tournament games were vacated due to NCAA sanctions; disputed record 29–5. **Disputed record 11–17. Rankings from AP Poll

=== Informal championships ===
Conference	Regular season winner	Most Valuable Player
Philadelphia Big 5	Saint Joseph's	Michael Brooks, La Salle

Saint Joseph's finished with a 4–0 record in head-to-head competition among the Philadelphia Big 5.

=== Statistical leaders ===
Points per game			Rebounds per game			Field-goal percentage			Free-throw percentage		
Player	School	PPG	Player	School	RPG	Player	School	FG%	Player	School	FT%
Tony Murphy	Southern	32.1	Larry Smith	Alcorn St.	15.1	Steve Johnson	Oregon St.	71.0	Brian Magid	George Washington	92.9
Lewis Lloyd	Drake	30.2	Lewis Lloyd	Drake	15.0	Ron Charles	Michigan St.	67.6	Randy Nesbit	The Citadel	92.5
Harry Kelly	TX Southern	29.0	Rickey Brown	Mississippi St.	14.4	Cherokee Rhone	Centenary	66.6	Kyle Macy	Kentucky	91.2
Ken Page	New Mexico	28.0	Monti Davis	Tenn. St.	13.3	Roosevelt Bouie	Syracuse	65.4	Greg Manning	Maryland	90.8
James Tillman	Eastern Kentucky	27.2	Gary Hooker	Murray St.	12.3	Murray Brown	Florida St.	64.6	Eddie White	Gonzaga	89.2

== Post-season tournaments ==
=== NCAA tournament ===
==== Final Four ====
Played at Market Square Arena in Indianapolis, Indiana

National semifinals
E5	Iowa	72
MW2	Louisville	80
ME6	Purdue	62
W8	UCLA	67

National finals
MW2	Louisville	59
W8	UCLA	54
Third place
E5	Iowa	58
ME6	Purdue	75

=== National Invitation tournament ===
==== NIT semifinals and finals ====
Played at Madison Square Garden in New York City

Semifinals
UNLV	71
Virginia	90
Minnesota	65
Illinois	63

Finals
Virginia	58
Minnesota	55
Third place
UNLV	74
Illinois	84

== Awards ==
=== Consensus All-American teams ===
Consensus First Team
Player	Position	Class	Team
Mark Aguirre	F	Sophomore	DePaul
Michael Brooks	F	Senior	La Salle
Joe Barry Carroll	C	Senior	Purdue
Darrell Griffith	G	Senior	Louisville
Kyle Macy	G	Senior	Kentucky

Consensus Second Team
Player	Position	Class	Team
Mike Gminski	C	Senior	Duke
Albert King	F	Junior	Maryland
Mike O'Koren	F	Senior	North Carolina
Kelvin Ransey	G	Senior	Ohio State
Sam Worthen	G	Senior	Marquette

=== Major player of the year awards ===
- Wooden Award: Darrell Griffith, Louisville
- Naismith Award: Mark Aguirre, DePaul
- Helms Player of the Year: Darrell Griffith, Louisville
- Associated Press Player of the Year: Mark Aguirre, DePaul
- UPI Player of the Year: Mark Aguirre, DePaul
- NABC Player of the Year: Michael Brooks, La Salle
- Oscar Robertson Trophy (USBWA): Mark Aguirre, DePaul
- Adolph Rupp Trophy: Mark Aguirre, DePaul
- Sporting News Player of the Year: Darrell Griffith, Louisville

=== Major coach of the year awards ===
- Associated Press Coach of the Year: Ray Meyer, DePaul
- Henry Iba Award (USBWA): Ray Meyer, DePaul
- NABC Coach of the Year: Lute Olson, Iowa
- UPI Coach of the Year: Ray Meyer, DePaul
- Sporting News Coach of the Year: Lute Olson, Iowa

=== Other major awards ===
- Frances Pomeroy Naismith Award (Best player under 6'0): Jim Sweeney, Boston College
- Robert V. Geasey Trophy (Top player in Philadelphia Big 5): Michael Brooks, La Salle
- NIT/Haggerty Award (Top player in New York City metro area): Jeff Ruland, Iona

== Coaching changes ==
A number of teams changed coaches during the season and after the season ended.

Team	Former Coach	Interim Coach	New Coach	Reason
Alabama	C. M. Newton		Wimp Sanderson	Newton resigned to take the same position at Southeastern Conference rival Vanderbilt
Akron	Ken Cunningham		Bob Rupert	
Army	Mike Krzyzewski		Pete Gaudet	
Baptist	David Reese		Phil Carter	
Boise State	Bus Connor		Dave Leach	
Cal State Fullerton	Bobby Dye		George McQuarn	
Colorado State	Jim Williams		Tony McAndrews	
Cornell	Ben Bluitt		Tom Miller	
Duke	Bill Foster		Mike Krzyzewski	Duke hired the untested Krzyzewski after a 9–17 season at Army.
Fairleigh Dickinson	Al Lobalbo		Don Feeley	
Florida	Ed Visscher		Norm Sloan	
George Mason	John Linn		Joe Harrington	
Georgia Southern	J. B. Scearce		John Nelson	
Hofstra	Joe Harrington		Dick Berg	
Iona	Jim Valvano		Pat Kennedy	
Iowa State	Lynn Nance	Rick Samuels	Johnny Orr	Nance resigned mid-season after an 8–10 start.
Lafayette	Roy Chipman		Will Rackley	
Lamar	Billy Tubbs		Pat Foster	
Loyola (IL)	Jerry Lyne		Gene Sullivan	
Loyola Marymount	Ron Jacobs		Ed Goorjian	
Michigan	Johnny Orr		Bill Frieder	
Navy	Bob Hamilton		Paul Evans	
Nebraska	Joe Cipriano		Moe Iba	Iba took the helm after Cipriano died of cancer in November 1980.
Nevada-Reno	Jim Carey		Sonny Allen	
Niagara	Dan Raskin		Peter Lonergan	
NC State	Norm Sloan		Jim Valvano	Sloan resigned at NC State to take over at Florida, his alma mater, to rebuild the Gators as they moved into their new arena.
Northwestern Louisiana	Tynes Hildebrand		Wayne Yates	
Ohio	Dale Bandy		Danny Nee	
Oklahoma	Dave Bliss		Billy Tubbs	
Pittsburgh	Tim Grgurich		Roy Chipman	
Purdue	Lee Rose		Gene Keady	
San Francisco	Dan Belluomini		Pete Barry	
South Carolina	Frank McGuire		Bill Foster	Hall of Fame coach McGuire retired after 30 years of coaching.
South Carolina State	Tim Autry		Johnny Jones	
South Florida	Chip Conner	Gordon Gibbons	Lee Rose	Conner was fired in January and later replaced with Rose – fresh off of a Final Four at Purdue.
Southern Methodist	Sonny Allen		Dave Bliss	
Southern Utah	Stan Jack		Tom McCracken	
Tennessee Tech	Cliff Malpass		Tom Deaton	
Tulsa	Jim King	Bill Franey	Nolan Richardson	King resigned due to family concerns in February. Tulsa hired reigning NJCAA championship coach Richardson.
UC Irvine	Tim Tift		Bill Mulligan	
Valparaiso	Ken Rochlitz		Tom Smith	
Western Kentucky	Gene Keady		Clem Haskins	
Wisconsin-Milwaukee	Bob Gottlieb		Bob Voight	
