= 1979–80 Maryland Terrapins men's basketball team =

American college basketball season

1979–80 Maryland Terrapins men's basketball

ACC Regular season champions

NCAA tournament, Sweet Sixteen
- Conference: Atlantic Coast Conference
- Record: 24–7 (11–3 ACC)
- Head coach: Lefty Driesell (11th season)
- Assistant coach: Tom Abatemarco (1st season)
- Home arena: Cole Field House

1979–80 ACC men's basketball standings
	Conf.				Overall
Team	W		L	PCT	W		L	PCT
No. 8 Maryland	11	–	3	.786	24	–	7	.774
No. 15 North Carolina	9	–	5	.643	21	–	8	.724
NC State	9	–	5	.643	20	–	8	.714
Clemson	8	–	6	.571	23	–	9	.719
Virginia	7	–	7	.500	24	–	10	.706
No. 14 Duke †	7	–	7	.500	24	–	9	.727
Wake Forest	4	–	10	.286	13	–	14	.481
Georgia Tech	1	–	13	.071	8	–	18	.308
† 1980 ACC tournament winner Rankings from AP Poll

The 1979–80 Maryland Terrapins men's basketball team represented the University of Maryland as a member of the Atlantic Coast Conference during the 1979–80 men's college basketball season. The team was led by head coach Lefty Driesell and played their home games at Cole Field House in College Park, Maryland. The Terrapins finished the season with a 24–7 overall record (11–3 ACC), won the ACC regular season title, and reached the Sweet Sixteen of the NCAA tournament before losing to Georgetown.

== Roster ==
1979–80 Maryland Terrapins men's basketball team
Players
Coaches

Pos.	#	Name	Height	Weight	Year	Hometown
G	15	Reggie Jackson	6 ft 4 in (1.93 m)	—	So	Philadelphia, PA
F	25	Ernie Graham	6 ft 7 in (2.01 m)	—	Jr
F	52	Buck Williams	6 ft 8 in (2.03 m)	210 lb (95 kg)	So	Rocky Mount, NC
G	55	Albert King (basketball)	6 ft 6 in (1.98 m)	—	Jr	Brooklyn, NY

Head coach

- Charles "Lefty" Driesell

Assistant coach(es)

- Tom Abatemarco (Dowling)

Legend

- (C) Team captain
- (S) Suspended
- (I) Ineligible
- (W) Walk-on
- Injured
- Current redshirt

Roster

== Schedule ==
Date time, TV	Rank^{#}	Opponent^{#}	Result	Record	Site city, state
Regular season
Dec 3, 1979*		Penn State	W 56–55	1–0	Cole Fieldhouse; College Park, Maryland
Dec 5, 1979*		at No. 17 Georgetown	L 71–83	1–1	McDonough Gymnasium; Washington, D.C.
Dec 8, 1979*		Brown	W 72–59	2–1	Cole Fieldhouse; College Park, Maryland
Dec 15, 1979*		Catholic	W 113–79	3–1	Cole Fieldhouse; College Park, Maryland
Dec 19, 1979		Georgia Tech	W 70–60	4–1 (1–0)	Cole Fieldhouse; College Park, Maryland
Dec 22, 1979*		Bucknell	W 95–73	5–1	Cole Fieldhouse; College Park, Maryland
Dec 28, 1979*		Miami (OH)	W 115–76	6–1	Cole Fieldhouse; College Park, Maryland
Dec 29, 1979*		Temple	W 85–63	7–1	Cole Fieldhouse; College Park, Maryland
Jan 3, 1980		Georgia Tech	W 83–74	8–1 (2–0)	Cole Fieldhouse; College Park, Maryland
Jan 5, 1980		at Wake Forest	W 84–76	9–1 (3–0)	Winston-Salem Memorial Coliseum; Winston-Salem, North Carolina
Jan 10, 1980		at NC State	L 62–67	9–2 (3–1)	Reynolds Coliseum; Raleigh, North Carolina
Jan 12, 1980*		Pittsburgh	W 95–88	10–2	Cole Fieldhouse; College Park, Maryland
Jan 16, 1980		No. 17 Clemson	W 84–83	11–2 (4–1)	Cole Fieldhouse; College Park, Maryland
Jan 20, 1980		at No. 9 North Carolina	W 92–86	12–2 (5–1)	Carmichael Auditorium; Chapel Hill, North Carolina
Jan 23, 1980*		NC State	W 66–62	13–2 (6–1)	Cole Fieldhouse; College Park, Maryland
Jan 26, 1980*		at No. 8 Notre Dame	L 63–64	13–3	Joyce Center; Notre Dame, Indiana
Jan 30, 1980	No. 12	at No. 13 Virginia	W 63–61	14–3 (7–1)	University Hall; Charlottesville, Virginia
Feb 2, 1980	No. 12	No. 5 Duke	W 73–69	15–3 (8–1)	Cole Fieldhouse; College Park, Maryland
Feb 7, 1980		No. 11 North Carolina	W 70–69	16–3 (9–1)	Cole Fieldhouse; College Park, Maryland
Feb 9, 1980		at No. 16 Clemson	L 81–90	16–4 (9–2)	Littlejohn Coliseum; Clemson, South Carolina
Feb 11, 1980*		Boston University	W 99–76	17–4	Cole Fieldhouse; College Park, Maryland
Feb 13, 1980*		East Carolina	W 85–72	18–4	Cole Fieldhouse; College Park, Maryland
Feb 16, 1980		at No. 16 Duke	L 61–66	18–5 (9–3)	Cameron Indoor Stadium; Durham, North Carolina
Feb 20, 1980	No. 9	Wake Forest	W 83–77	19–5 (10–3)	Cole Fieldhouse; College Park, Maryland
Feb 23, 1980	No. 9	Virginia	W 82–71	20–5 (11–3)	Cole Fieldhouse; College Park, Maryland
ACC Tournament
Feb 28, 1980*	No. 7	vs. Georgia Tech; Quarterfinals	W 51–49 ^{OT}	21–5	Greensboro Coliseum; Greensboro, North Carolina
Feb 29, 1980*	No. 7	vs. No. 17 Clemson; Semifinals	W 91–85	22–5	Greensboro Coliseum; Greensboro, North Carolina
Mar 1, 1980*	No. 7	vs. Duke; Championship game	L 72–73	22–6	Greensboro Coliseum; Greensboro, North Carolina
NCAA Tournament
Mar 8, 1980*	(2 E) No. 8	vs. (7 E) Tennessee; Second round	W 86–75	23–6	Greensboro Coliseum; Greensboro, North Carolina
Mar 14, 1980*	(2 E) No. 8	vs. (3 E) No. 11 Georgetown; East Regional Semifinal – Sweet Sixteen	L 68–74	23–7	The Spectrum (17,569); Philadelphia, Pennsylvania
*Non-conference game. ^{#}Rankings from AP Poll. (#) Tournament seedings in parentheses. E=East. All times are in Eastern Time.
