= 1979–80 Rutgers Scarlet Knights men's basketball team =

American college basketball season

1979–80 Rutgers Scarlet Knights men's basketball
- Conference: Eastern Athletic Association
- Record: 14–14 (7–3 EAA)
- Head coach: Tom Young (7th season)
- Home arena: Louis Brown Athletic Center

1979–80 Eastern 8 men's basketball standings
	Conf.				Overall
Team	W		L	PCT	W		L	PCT
Villanova †	7	–	3	.700	23	–	8	.742
Duquesne	6	–	3	.667	18	–	10	.643
Rutgers	6	–	3	.667	14	–	14	.500
Pittsburgh	5	–	4	.556	17	–	12	.586
George Washington	5	–	5	.500	15	–	11	.577
St. Bonaventure	1	–	3	.250	16	–	11	.593
West Virginia	4	–	4	.500	15	–	14	.517
UMass	0	–	9	.000	2	–	24	.077
† 1980 Eastern 8 Tournament winner Rankings from AP Poll

The 1979–80 Rutgers Scarlet Knights men's basketball team represented Rutgers University as a member of the Eastern Athletic Association during the 1979–80 NCAA Division I men's basketball season. The head coach was Tom Young, then in his seven season with the Scarlet Knights. The team played its home games in Louis Brown Athletic Center in Piscataway, New Jersey.

== Schedule and results ==
Date time, TV	Rank^{#}	Opponent^{#}	Result	Record	Site (attendance) city, state
Regular season
Dec 3, 1979*		Drexel	W 69–62 ^{OT}	1–0	Louis Brown Athletic Center (3,910); Piscataway, NJ
Dec 7, 1979*		Manhattan	W 67–57	2–0	Louis Brown Athletic Center; Piscataway, NJ
Dec 8, 1979*		Saint Peter's	W 58–50	3–0	Louis Brown Athletic Center; Piscataway, NJ
Dec 11, 1979		UMass	W 84–68	4–0 (1–0)	Louis Brown Athletic Center; Piscataway, NJ
Dec 15, 1979*		No. 15 St. John's	L 64–75	4–1	Louis Brown Athletic Center; Piscataway, NJ
Dec 22, 1979		Villanova	L 64–75	4–2 (1–1)	Louis Brown Athletic Center; Piscataway, NJ
Dec 28, 1979*		at Minnesota	L 59–98	4–3	Williams Arena; Minneapolis, Minnesota
Dec 29, 1979*		at Loyola (IL)	L 87–98	4–4	Williams Arena; Minneapolis, Minnesota
Jan 5, 1980		at UMass	W 76–70	5–4 (2–1)	Curry Hicks Cage; Amherst, Massachusetts
Jan 8, 1980*		Lehigh	W 81–63	6–4	Louis Brown Athletic Center; Piscataway, NJ
Jan 12, 1980		George Washington	W 69–59	7–4 (3–1)	Louis Brown Athletic Center; Piscataway, NJ
Jan 15, 1980*		Cleveland State	L 69–78	7–5	Louis Brown Athletic Center; Piscataway, NJ
Jan 17, 1980*		Long Island	L 67–68 ^{OT}	7–6	Louis Brown Athletic Center; Piscataway, NJ
Jan 19, 1980*		at Penn State	L 66–75	7–7	Rec Hall; University Park, Pennsylvania
Jan 21, 1980*		at Columbia	W 65–49	8–7	Levien Gymnasium; Manhattan, NY
Jan 24, 1980*		Syracuse	L 66–69	8–8	Louis Brown Athletic Center; Piscataway, NJ
Jan 27, 1980		at Duquesne	W 75–73 ^{OT}	9–8 (4–1)	Civic Arena; Pittsburgh, Pennsylvania
Jan 29, 1980*		Biscayne	W 78–58	10–8	Louis Brown Athletic Center; Piscataway, NJ
Feb 2, 1980		at George Washington	L 71–76	10–9 (4–2)	Charles E. Smith Center; Washington, D. C.
Feb 5, 1980*		at Princeton	L 63–65	10–10	Jadwin Gymnasium; Princeton, NJ
Feb 9, 1980		West Virginia	W 82–80 ^{OT}	11–10 (5–2)	Louis Brown Athletic Center; Piscataway, NJ
Feb 12, 1980		at Villanova	L 68–70	11–11 (5–3)	Villanova Field House; Villanova, Pennsylvania
Feb 14, 1980*		No. 11 North Carolina	L 70–73 ^{OT}	11–12	Louis Brown Athletic Center; Piscataway, NJ
Feb 16, 1980*		at Fordham	L 39–42	11–13	Rose Hill Gymnasium; The Bronx, New York
Feb 20, 1980*		Seton Hall	W 75–66	12–13	Louis Brown Athletic Center; Piscataway, NJ
Feb 23, 1980		Pittsburgh	W 83–76	13–13 (6–3)	Louis Brown Athletic Center; Piscataway, NJ
EAAC Tournament
Feb 26, 1980	(3)	(6) St. Bonaventure; Quarterfinals	W 76–74	14–13	Louis Brown Athletic Center; Piscataway, NJ
Feb 29, 1980	(3)	vs. (7) West Virginia; Semifinals	L 66–77	14–14	Civic Arena; Pittsburgh, Pennsylvania
*Non-conference game. ^{#}Rankings from AP Poll. (#) Tournament seedings in parentheses. All times are in Eastern Time.

== Team players drafted into the NBA ==
Round	Pick	Player	NBA club
5	105	Daryl Strickland	Washington Bullets
