= 1979–80 Penn Quakers men's basketball team =

American college basketball season

1979–80 Penn Quakers men's basketball

Ivy League champions

NCAA tournament, Second Round
- Conference: Ivy League
- Record: 17–12 (11–3 Ivy)
- Head coach: Bob Weinhauer (3rd season)
- Home arena: The Palestra

1979–80 Ivy League men's basketball standings
	Conf.				Overall
Team	W		L	PCT	W		L	PCT
Penn	11	–	3	.786	17	–	12	.586
Princeton	11	–	3	.786	15	–	15	.500
Brown	9	–	5	.643	12	–	14	.462
Yale	8	–	6	.571	16	–	10	.615
Harvard	6	–	8	.429	11	–	15	.423
Columbia	5	–	9	.357	10	–	16	.385
Dartmouth	3	–	11	.214	6	–	20	.231
Cornell	3	–	11	.214	5	–	19	.208
Rankings from AP Poll

The 1979–80 Penn Quakers men's basketball team represented the University of Pennsylvania as a member of the Ivy League during the 1979–80 NCAA Division I men's basketball season. Led by head coach Bob Weinhauer, the Quakers played their home games at The Palestra in Philadelphia. A year after reaching the Final Four, Penn again finished as Ivy League champions by defeating co-champion Princeton in a play-in game to receive an automatic bid to the NCAA tournament. Playing as the No. 12 seed in the Mideast region, the Quakers defeated No. 5 seed Washington State in the opening round, before losing to No. 4 seed Duke in the second round.

== Roster ==
1981–82 Penn Quakers men's basketball team
Players	Coaches
Pos. / # / Name / Height / Weight / Year / Hometown; F / 11 / Paul Little / 6 ft 5 in (1.96 m) / — / Fr	Head coach: Bob Weinhauer; Assistant coach(es) Legend: (C) Team captain; (S) Suspended; (I) Ineligible; (W) Walk-on; Injured; Current redshirt

== Schedule ==
Date time, TV	Rank^{#}	Opponent^{#}	Result	Record	Site city, state
December 4*		at Wake Forest	L 58–88	0–1	Winston-Salem Memorial Coliseum; Winston-Salem, NC
December 7*		vs. Davidson	L 62–71	0–2	Charlotte Coliseum; Charlotte, NC
December 8*		vs. Oklahoma	L 76–91	0–3	Charlotte Coliseum; Charlotte, NC
December 11*		Duke	L 56–70	0–4	Palestra; Philadelphia, Pennsylvania
December 15*		Navy	W 69–54	1–4	Palestra; Philadelphia, Pennsylvania
December 22*		at Saints Francis	W 68–52	2–4	Maurice Stokes Athletic Center; Loretto, Pennsylvania
January 5		Princeton	W 58–42	3–4 (1–0)	Palestra; Philadelphia, Pennsylvania
January 8*		Temple	W 59–46	4–4 (1–0)	Palestra; Philadelphia, Pennsylvania
January 11		Brown	W 64–47	5–4 (2–0)	Palestra; Philadelphia, Pennsylvania
January 12		Yale	W 84–64	6–4 (3–0)	Palestra; Philadelphia, Pennsylvania
January 16*		at Virginia	L 39–69	6–5 (3–0)	University Hall; Charlottesville, Virginia
January 19*		Villanova	L 51–65	6–6 (3–0)	Palestra; Philadelphia, Pennsylvania
January 23*		Saint Joseph's	L 56–60	6–7 (3–0)	Palestra; Philadelphia, Pennsylvania
January 26*		Richmond	W 84–78	7–7 (3–0)	Palestra; Philadelphia, Pennsylvania
February 1		Cornell	W 75–50	8–7 (4–0)	Palestra; Philadelphia, Pennsylvania
February 2		Columbia	W 62–57	9–7 (5–0)	Palestra; Philadelphia, Pennsylvania
February 8		at Dartmouth	W 51–46	10–7 (6–0)	Alumni Gymnasium; Hanover, NH
February 9		at Harvard	W 88–79	11–7 (7–0)	Malkin Athletic Center; Cambridge, Massachusetts
February 12*		La Salle	L 73–80	11–8 (7–0)	Palestra; Philadelphia, Pennsylvania
February 15		at Yale	W 73–68	12–8 (8–0)	Payne Whitney Gymnasium; New Haven, CT
February 16		at Brown	L 58–71	12–9 (8–1)	Marvel Gymnasium; Providence, RI
February 22		Harvard	W 84–73	13–9 (9–1)	Palestra; Philadelphia, Pennsylvania
February 23		Dartmouth	W 84–50	14–9 (10–1)	Palestra; Philadelphia, Pennsylvania
February 26		at Princeton	L 69–70	14–10 (10–2)	Jadwin Gymnasium; Princeton, NJ
February 29		at Columbia	L 51–55	14–11 (10–3)	Levien Gymnasium; Manhattan, NY
March 1		at Cornell	W 67–46	15–11 (11–3)	Barton Hall; Ithaca, NY
March 3*		Princeton; Ivy League Play-in game	W 50–49	16–11	Palestra; Philadelphia, Pennsylvania
March 6*		vs. Washington State; NCAA Tournament • First Round	W 62–55	17–11 (12–3)	Mackey Arena; West Lafayette, Indiana
March 9*		vs. Duke; NCAA Tournament • Second Round	L 42–52	17–12 (12–3)	Mackey Arena; West Lafayette, Indiana
*Non-conference game. ^{#}Rankings from AP Poll. (#) Tournament seedings in parentheses.
