= 1979–80 Villanova Wildcats men's basketball team =

American college basketball season

1979–80 Villanova Wildcats men's basketball

EAA Regular season champions EAA Tournament champions

NCAA Men's Division I Tournament, Second round
- Conference: Eastern Athletic Association
- Record: 23–8 (7–3 EAA)
- Head coach: Rollie Massimino (7th season)
- Assistant coaches: Mitch Buonaguro (3rd season); Marty Marbach (1st season); Harry Booth
- Home arena: Villanova Field House

1979–80 Eastern 8 men's basketball standings
	Conf.				Overall
Team	W		L	PCT	W		L	PCT
Villanova †	7	–	3	.700	23	–	8	.742
Duquesne	6	–	3	.667	18	–	10	.643
Rutgers	6	–	3	.667	14	–	14	.500
Pittsburgh	5	–	4	.556	17	–	12	.586
George Washington	5	–	5	.500	15	–	11	.577
St. Bonaventure	1	–	3	.250	16	–	11	.593
West Virginia	4	–	4	.500	15	–	14	.517
UMass	0	–	9	.000	2	–	24	.077
† 1980 Eastern 8 Tournament winner Rankings from AP Poll

The 1979–80 Villanova Wildcats men's basketball team represented Villanova University during the 1979–80 NCAA Division I men's basketball season. The head coach was Rollie Massimino. The team played its home games at Villanova Field House in Villanova, Pennsylvania, and was a member of the Eastern Athletic Association. The team won the regular season Big East title and reached the second round of the NCAA tournament before falling to Syracuse. Villanova finished with a 23–8 record (7–3 Big East).

== Roster ==
1979–80 Villanova Wildcats men's basketball team
Players
Coaches

Pos.	#	Name	Height	Weight	Year	Hometown
G	3	Rory Sparrow	6 ft 2 in (1.88 m)	—	Sr	Paterson, New Jersey
G	10	Stewart Granger	6 ft 3 in (1.91 m)	185 lb (84 kg)	Fr	Brooklyn, New York
F	44	Alex Bradley	6 ft 6 in (1.98 m)	210 lb (95 kg)	Jr	Long Branch, New Jersey
F	45	John Pinone	6 ft 8 in (2.03 m)	225 lb (102 kg)	Fr	Hartford, Connecticut
G	14	Jeff Sherry	6 ft 3 in (1.91 m)	190 lb (86 kg)	So	Macungie, Pennsylvania

Head coach

- Rollie Massimino (Vermont)

Assistant coach(es)

- Mitch Buonaguro (Boston College)
- Marty Marbach (Saint Francis (PA))
- Harry Booth (Saint Joseph's)

Legend

- (C) Team captain
- (S) Suspended
- (I) Ineligible
- (W) Walk-on
- Injured
- Current redshirt

== Schedule and results ==
Date time, TV	Rank^{#}	Opponent^{#}	Result	Record	Site city, state
Regular season
Dec 10, 1979*		at Princeton	W 57–55	3–0	Jadwin Gymnasium; Princeton, New Jersey
Dec 28, 1979*		vs. Saint Francis (PA)	W 93–66	6–1	Rochester Community War Memorial; Rochester, New York
Dec 29, 1979*		vs. No. 9 Syracuse	L 84–92	6–2	Rochester Community War Memorial; Rochester, New York
EAA tournament
Feb 26, 1980*		UMass; Quarterfinals	W 85–62	19–7	Villanova Field House; Villanova, Pennsylvania
Feb 27, 1980*		at Pittsburgh; Semifinals	W 72–59	21–7	Civic Arena; Pittsburgh, Pennsylvania
Mar 1, 1980*		vs. West Virginia; Championship game	W 74–62	22–7	Civic Arena; Pittsburgh, Pennsylvania
NCAA tournament
Mar 7, 1980*	(8 E)	vs. (9 E) Marquette; First round	W 77–59	23–7	Providence Civic Center; Providence, Rhode Island
Mar 9, 1980*	(8 E)	vs. (1 E) No. 6 Syracuse; Second round	L 83–97	23–8	Providence Civic Center; Providence, Rhode Island
*Non-conference game. ^{#}Rankings from AP poll. (#) Tournament seedings in parentheses. E=East.
