= 1979–80 Western Kentucky Hilltoppers basketball team =

American college basketball season

1979–80 Western Kentucky Hilltoppers basketball

OVC Tournament Champion Ohio Valley Conference Champion

NCAA Tournament, First Round
- Conference: Ohio Valley Conference
- Record: 21–8 (10–2 OVC)
- Head coach: Gene Keady
- Assistant coach: Clem Haskins
- Home arena: E. A. Diddle Arena

1979–80 Ohio Valley Conference men's basketball standings
| | Conf. | | | | Overall |
| Team | W | | L | PCT | W | | L | PCT |
|---|---|---|---|---|---|---|---|---|
| Western Kentucky † | 10 | – | 2 | .833 | 21 | – | 8 | .724 |
| Murray State | 10 | – | 2 | .833 | 23 | – | 8 | .742 |
| Morehead State | 7 | – | 5 | .583 | 15 | – | 12 | .556 |
| Eastern Kentucky | 7 | – | 5 | .583 | 15 | – | 12 | .556 |
| Middle Tennessee | 5 | – | 7 | .417 | 13 | – | 13 | .500 |
| Austin Peay State | 2 | – | 10 | .167 | 8 | – | 18 | .308 |
| Tennessee Tech | 1 | – | 11 | .083 | 5 | – | 21 | .192 |
† 1980 OVC tournament winner Rankings from AP poll

The 1979–80 Western Kentucky Hilltoppers men's basketball team represented Western Kentucky University during the 1979–80 NCAA Division I men's basketball season. The Hilltoppers were members of the Ohio Valley Conference and led by future National Collegiate Basketball Hall of Fame coach Gene Keady. WKU won the OVC regular season and tournament championships and received the conference's automatic bid to the 1980 NCAA Division I Basketball Tournament. Craig McCormick and Bill Bryant made the All-OVC Team, and McCormick was selected as OVC Tournament MVP.

== Schedule ==
| Date time, TV | Rank^{#} | Opponent^{#} | Result | Record | Site city, state |
Regular season
| 12/1/1979* | | Rollins | W 104–73 | 1–0 | E. A. Diddle Arena; Bowling Green, KY |
| 12/3/1979* | | at Illinois State | L 55–66 | 1–1 | Horton Field House; Normal, IL |
| 12/6/1979* | | at Duquesne | L 73–84 | 1–2 | Mellon Arena; Pittsburgh, PA |
| 12/8/1979* | | Florida A&M | W 87–60 | 2–2 | E. A. Diddle Arena; Bowling Green, KY |
| 12/13/1979* | | vs. Evansville; Holiday Classic | W 75–61 | 3–2 | Freedom Hall; Louisville, KY |
| 12/14/1979* | | at No. 12 Louisville; Holiday Classic | L 74–96 | 3–3 | Freedom Hall; Louisville, KY |
| 12/29/1979* | | Florida State | L 65–67 | 3–4 | E. A. Diddle Arena; Bowling Green, KY |
| 1/3/1980* | | Butler | W 66–62 | 4–4 | E. A. Diddle Arena; Bowling Green, KY |
| 1/5/1980* | | at Louisiana Tech | W 63–59 | 5–4 | Memorial Gym; Ruston, LA |
| 1/7/1980* | | East Tennessee | W 71–59 | 6–4 | E. A. Diddle Arena; Bowling Green, KY |
| 1/10/1980* | | Akron | W 92–58 | 7–4 | E. A. Diddle Arena; Bowling Green, KY |
| 1/12/1980 | | Tennessee Tech | W 97–72 | 8–4 (1-0) | E. A. Diddle Arena; Bowling Green, KY |
| 1/17/1980 | | Murray State | W 68–48 | 9–4 (2-0) | E. A. Diddle Arena; Bowling Green, KY |
| 1/19/1980 | | at Austin Peay | W 95–71 | 10–4 (3-0) | Dunn Center; Clarksville, TN |
| 1/21/1980* | | Dayton | W 71–65 | 11–4 | E. A. Diddle Arena; Bowling Green, KY |
| 1/24/1980 | | at Middle Tennessee | W 62–58 | 12–4 (4-0) | Murphy Center; Murfreesboro, TN |
| 1/26/1980 | | at Eastern Kentucky | L 82–84 | 12–5 (4-1) | Alumni Coliseum; Richmond, KY |
| 1/31/1980 | | Morehead State | W 86–79 | 13–5 (5-1) | E. A. Diddle Arena; Bowling Green, KY |
| 2/2/1980 | | Eastern Kentucky | W 74–62 | 14–5 (6-1) | E. A. Diddle Arena; Bowling Green, KY |
| 2/7/1980* | | at Akron | W 70–68 | 15–5 | James A. Rhodes Arena; Akron, OH |
| 2/9/1980 | | at Tennessee Tech | W 75–56 | 16–5 (7-1) | Eblen Center; Cookeville, TN |
| 2/11/1980 | | at Morehead State | L 73–76 | 16–6 (7-2) | Wetherby Gymnasium; Morehead, KY |
| 2/14/1980 | | Austin Peay | W 70–51 | 17–6 (8-2) | E. A. Diddle Arena; Bowling Green, KY |
| 2/16/1980 | | at Murray State | W 56–55 | 18–6 (9-2) | Racer Arena; Murray, KY |
| 2/21/1980 | | Middle Tennessee | W 81–79 ^{3OT} | 19–6 (10-2) | E. A. Diddle Arena; Bowling Green, KY |
| 2/23/1980* | | at South Carolina | L 65–73 ^{2OT} | 19–7 | Carolina Coliseum; Columbia, SC |
1980 Ohio Valley Conference Men's Basketball Tournament
| 2/28/1980 | (1) | (4) Eastern Kentucky; Semifinals | W 84–83 ^{OT} | 20–7 | E. A. Diddle Arena; Bowling Green, KY |
| 3/1/1980 | (1) | (2) Murray State; Championship | W 54–51 | 21–7 | E. A. Diddle Arena; Bowling Green, KY |
1980 NCAA Division I Basketball Tournament
| 3/7/1980* | (10 ME) | (7 ME) Virginia Tech; First Round | L 85–89 ^{OT} | 21–8 | E. A. Diddle Arena; Bowling Green, KY |
*Non-conference game. ^{#}Rankings from AP Poll. (#) Tournament seedings in parentheses.
