= 1979–80 South Alabama Jaguars basketball team =

American college basketball season

1979–80 South Alabama Jaguars men's basketball

Sun Belt Regular season champions

NCAA tournament, first round
- Conference: Sun Belt Conference
- East Division
- Record: 23–6 (12–2 Sun Belt)
- Head coach: Cliff Ellis (5th season)
- Home arena: Jaguar Gym; Mobile Municipal Auditorium

1979–80 Sun Belt Conference men's basketball standings
	Conf.				Overall
Team	W		L	PCT	W		L	PCT
South Alabama	12	–	2	.857	23	–	6	.793
UAB	10	–	4	.714	18	–	12	.600
Jacksonville	10	–	4	.714	20	–	9	.690
UNC Charlotte	9	–	5	.643	15	–	12	.556
VCU †	8	–	6	.571	18	–	12	.600
Georgia State	4	–	10	.286	6	–	21	.222
New Orleans	2	–	12	.143	5	–	21	.192
South Florida	1	–	13	.071	6	–	21	.222
† 1980 Sun Belt Conference tournament winner Rankings from AP Poll

The 1979–80 South Alabama Jaguars basketball team represented the University of South Alabama during the 1979–80 NCAA Division I men's basketball season. The Jaguars were led by head coach Cliff Ellis, in his fifth year as head coach. They played their home games at the Mobile Civic Center, and were members of the Sun Belt Conference. South Alabama finished the season 23–6, 12–2 in Sun Belt play to finish in first place. They were upset by Jacksonville in the Sun Belt tournament, but did receive an at-large bid to the 1980 NCAA tournament as the No. 8 seed in the Midwest region. In the opening round, the Jaguars lost to Alcorn State, 70–62.

== Roster ==
1979–80 South Alabama Jaguars men's basketball team
Players
Coaches

Pos.	#	Name	Height	Weight	Year	Hometown
F		Rory White	6 ft 8 in (2.03 m)	210 lb (95 kg)	Jr	Tuskegee, Alabama
F	15	Ed Rains	6 ft 7 in (2.01 m)	—	Jr	Ocala, Florida

Head coach

- Cliff Ellis (Florida State)

Assistant coach(es)

Legend

- (C) Team captain
- (S) Suspended
- (I) Ineligible
- (W) Walk-on
- Injured
- Current redshirt

== Schedule and results ==
Date time, TV	Rank^{#}	Opponent^{#}	Result	Record	Site (attendance) city, state
Regular season
Dec 1, 1979*		at No. 10 Louisville	L 73–75	0–1	Freedom Hall; Louisville, Kentucky
Dec 3, 1979*		McNeese State	W 61–58	1–1	Jaguar Gym; Mobile, Alabama
Dec 7, 1979*		at Tennessee Tech	W 97–68	2–1	Eblen Center; Cookeville, Tennessee
Dec 8, 1979*		at Middle Tennessee	W 55–49	3–1	Murphy Center; Murfreesboro, Tennessee
Dec 13, 1979*		at Hardin-Simmons	W 81–63	4–1	
Dec 15, 1979*		Oregon Tech	W 98–62	5–1	Jaguar Gym; Mobile, Alabama
Dec 17, 1979		at VCU	W 60–56	6–1 (1–0)	Richmond Coliseum; Richmond, Virginia
Dec 19, 1979		at New Orleans	W 65–54	7–1 (2–0)	Human Performance Center; New Orleans, Louisiana
Dec 27, 1979*		Rider; Senior Bowl	W 101–72	8–1	Jaguar Gym; Mobile, Alabama
Dec 28, 1979*		Alcorn State; Senior Bowl	L 77–82	8–2	Jaguar Gym; Mobile, Alabama
Jan 3, 1980*		Missouri Baptist	W 105–47	9–2	Jaguar Gym; Mobile, Alabama
Jan 5, 1980		VCU	L 74–87	9–3 (2–1)	Jaguar Gym; Mobile, Alabama
Jan 7, 1980		at Georgia State	W 70–61	10–3 (3–1)	GSU Sports Arena; Atlanta, Georgia
Jan 9, 1980		at Jacksonville	W 64–63	11–3 (4–1)	Jacksonville Coliseum; Jacksonville, Florida
Jan 13, 1980		South Florida	W 85–55	12–3 (5–1)	Jaguar Gym; Mobile, Alabama
Jan 16, 1980		Georgia State	W 70–59	13–3 (6–1)	Jaguar Gym; Mobile, Alabama
Jan 18, 1980		New Orleans	W 74–56	14–3 (7–1)	Jaguar Gym; Mobile, Alabama
Jan 24, 1980		UAB	L 62–70	14–4 (7–2)	Mobile Civic Center (10,513); Mobile, Alabama
Jan 26, 1980		at UNC Charlotte	W 80–69	15–4 (8–2)	Independence Arena; Charlotte, North Carolina
Jan 28, 1980		at South Florida	W 88–72	16–4 (9–2)	Curtis Hixon Hall; Tampa, Florida
Jan 30, 1980		UNC Charlotte	W 66–65	17–4 (10–2)	Jaguar Gym; Mobile, Alabama
Feb 4, 1980		Jacksonville	W 65–58	18–4 (11–2)	Jaguar Gym; Mobile, Alabama
Feb 7, 1980*		at Georgia Southern	W 94–79	19–4	Hanner Fieldhouse; Statesboro, Georgia
Feb 12, 1980*		Georgia Southern	W 89–61	20–4	Jaguar Gym; Mobile, Alabama
Feb 15, 1980*		Hardin-Simmons	W 76–64	21–4	Jaguar Gym; Mobile, Alabama
Feb 17, 1980		at UAB	W 66–65	22–4 (12–2)	BJCC Arena (8,352); Birmingham, Alabama
Sun Belt Conference tournament
Feb 23, 1980*		vs. South Florida; Quarterfinals	W 86–57	23–4	Charlotte Coliseum; Charlotte, North Carolina
Feb 24, 1980*		vs. VCU; Semifinals	L 72–74	23–5	Charlotte Coliseum; Charlotte, North Carolina
NCAA tournament
Mar 7, 1980*	(9 MW)	vs. (8 MW) Alcorn State; First round	L 62–70	23–6	UNT Coliseum; Denton, Texas
*Non-conference game. ^{#}Rankings from AP Poll. (#) Tournament seedings in parentheses. MW=Midwest. All times are in Central Time.
