= 1980 Sun Belt Conference men's basketball tournament =

- Classification: Division I
- Season: 1979–80
- Teams: 8
- Site: Campus Sites; Charlotte Coliseum; Campus Sites; Charlotte, NC
- Champions: VCU (1st title)
- Winning coach: J.D. Barnett (1st title)
- MVP: Ed Sherod (VCU)

1979–80 Sun Belt Conference men's basketball standings
	Conf.				Overall
Team	W		L	PCT	W		L	PCT
South Alabama	12	–	2	.857	23	–	6	.793
UAB	10	–	4	.714	18	–	12	.600
Jacksonville	10	–	4	.714	20	–	9	.690
UNC Charlotte	9	–	5	.643	15	–	12	.556
VCU †	8	–	6	.571	18	–	12	.600
Georgia State	4	–	10	.286	6	–	21	.222
New Orleans	2	–	12	.143	5	–	21	.192
South Florida	1	–	13	.071	6	–	21	.222
† 1980 Sun Belt Conference tournament winner Rankings from AP Poll

The 1980 Sun Belt Conference men's basketball tournament was held February 23–25 at the Charlotte Coliseum in Charlotte, North Carolina.

VCU defeated UAB in the championship game, 105–88, to win their first Sun Belt men's basketball tournament. Both programs were in their first season in the Sun Belt.

The Rams, in turn, received an automatic bid for the 1980 NCAA tournament, where they lost to Iowa in the first round. Top-seeded South Alabama, who lost to VCU in the semifinal round, still received an at-large bid; the Jaguars ultimately lost to Alcorn State in the NCAA tournament's first round.

== Format ==
With the addition of UAB and VCU to the Sun Belt, the conference's membership expanded to eight teams. All eight teams participated in the tournament field and were seeded based on their regular season conference records. All eight teams entered the single-elimination tournament in the quarterfinal round.

All of the games were played at the Charlotte Coliseum in Charlotte, North Carolina.

== Bracket ==
Quarterfinals; Saturday, February 23
1	South Alabama	86
8	South Florida	57
5	VCU	100
4	UNC Charlotte	93
3	Jacksonville	70
6	Georgia State	59
7	New Orleans	75
2	UAB	85

Semifinals; Sunday, February 24
1	South Alabama	72
5	VCU	74
3	Jacksonville	60
2	UAB	64

Championship; Monday, February 25
5	VCU	105
2	UAB	88
