= 1980 SWAC men's basketball tournament =

Basketball Tournament March 1984 in Mississippi

- Classification: Division I
- Season: 1979–80
- Teams: 6
- First round site: Campus Sites
- Semifinals site: Mississippi Coliseum; Jackson, Mississippi
- Finals site: Mississippi Coliseum; Jackson, Mississippi
- Champions: Alcorn State (1st title)
- Winning coach: Davey Whitney (1st title)

1979–80 SWAC men's basketball standings
	Conf.				Overall
Team	W		L	PCT	W		L	PCT
Alcorn State †	8	–	0	1.000	28	–	2	.933
Grambling	6	–	4	.600	22	–	8	.733
Jackson State	3	–	5	.375	15	–	14	.517
Southern	3	–	6	.333	14	–	15	.483
Texas Southern	2	–	7	.222	9	–	17	.346
Prairie View		–		–	10	–	18	.357
Mississippi Valley State		–		–	3	–	24	.111
† 1980 SWAC tournament winner Rankings from AP Poll

The 1980 SWAC men's basketball tournament was held February 28–March 2, 1980. The quarterfinal round was held at the home arena of the higher-seeded team, while the semifinal and championship rounds were held at the Mississippi Coliseum in Jackson, Mississippi. Alcorn State defeated Jackson State, 83–61 in the championship game. The Braves received the conference's automatic bid to the 1980 NCAA tournament as No. 8 seed in the Midwest Region.

== Bracket and results ==
Quarterfinals; Feb 28
4	Southern	97
5	Texas Southern	95
3	Jackson State	98
6	Mississippi Valley State	82

Semifinals; March 1
1	Alcorn State	116
4	Southern	92
3	Jackson State	77
2	Grambling State	84

Final; March 2
1	Alcorn State	83
2	Grambling State	61
Third place
4	Southern	101
3	Jackson State	106
