= 1979–80 NC State Wolfpack men's basketball team =

American college basketball season

1979–80 NC State Wolfpack men's basketball

NCAA Tournament, First Round
- Conference: Atlantic Coast Conference
- Record: 20–8 (9–5 ACC)
- Head coach: Norm Sloan (14th season)
- Assistant coaches: Marty Fletcher (2nd season); Monte Towe (2nd season)
- Home arena: Reynolds Coliseum

1979–80 ACC men's basketball standings
	Conf.				Overall
Team	W		L	PCT	W		L	PCT
No. 8 Maryland	11	–	3	.786	24	–	7	.774
No. 15 North Carolina	9	–	5	.643	21	–	8	.724
NC State	9	–	5	.643	20	–	8	.714
Clemson	8	–	6	.571	23	–	9	.719
Virginia	7	–	7	.500	24	–	10	.706
No. 14 Duke †	7	–	7	.500	24	–	9	.727
Wake Forest	4	–	10	.286	13	–	14	.481
Georgia Tech	1	–	13	.071	8	–	18	.308
† 1980 ACC tournament winner Rankings from AP Poll

The 1979–80 NC State Wolfpack men's basketball team represented North Carolina State University as a member of the Atlantic Coast Conference during the 1979–80 men's college basketball season. Led by head coach Norm Sloan, in his 14th and final season at NC State, the Wolfpack played their home games at Reynolds Coliseum in Raleigh, North Carolina.

After finishing tied for 2nd in the ACC regular season standings, NC State was dismissed from the ACC tournament by Duke in the quarterfinals. The Wolfpack received a bid to the NCAA tournament as No. 4 seed in the East region. No. 5 seed Iowa end NC State's season in the second round, 77–64. The Hawkeyes would go on to reach the Final Four.

== Roster ==
1979–80 NC State Wolfpack men's basketball team
Players
Coaches

Pos.	#	Name	Height	Weight	Year	Hometown
G	3	Clyde Austin	6 ft 2 in (1.88 m)	150 lb (68 kg)	Sr	Richmond, Virginia
G	4	Dereck Whittenburg	6 ft 1 in (1.85 m)	187 lb (85 kg)	Fr	Glenarden, Maryland
G	10	Max Perry	6 ft 1 in (1.85 m)	160 lb (73 kg)	So	Hanover, Indiana
G	12	Emmett Lay	6 ft 4 in (1.93 m)	196 lb (89 kg)	So	Tabor City, North Carolina
G	14	Phil Weber	6 ft 1 in (1.85 m)	165 lb (75 kg)	Fr	Northport, New York
F	33	Art Jones	6 ft 7 in (2.01 m)	181 lb (82 kg)	Jr	Hampton, Virginia
G	34	Kenny Matthews	6 ft 4 in (1.93 m)	200 lb (91 kg)	Jr	Washington, D.C.
G	35	Sidney Lowe	6 ft 0 in (1.83 m)	188 lb (85 kg)	Fr	Washington, D.C.
F	40	Scott Parzych	6 ft 7 in (2.01 m)	223 lb (101 kg)	So	Lockport, Illinois
C	41	Thurl Bailey	6 ft 11 in (2.11 m)	230 lb (104 kg)	Fr	Washington, D.C.
C	42	Craig Watts	7 ft 0 in (2.13 m)	221 lb (100 kg)	Jr	South Easton, Massachusetts
F	43	Hawkeye Whitney	6 ft 5 in (1.96 m)	213 lb (97 kg)	Sr	Washington, D.C.
G	45	Donnie Perkins	6 ft 3 in (1.91 m)	189 lb (86 kg)	Jr	Bethel, North Carolina
C	52	Chuck Nevitt	7 ft 5 in (2.26 m)	220 lb (100 kg)	So	Marietta, Georgia

Head coach

- Jim Valvano (Rutgers)

Assistant coach(es)

- Marty Fletcher (Maryland)

Legend

- (C) Team captain
- (S) Suspended
- (I) Ineligible
- (W) Walk-on
- Injured
- Current redshirt

== Schedule ==
Date time, TV	Rank^{#}	Opponent^{#}	Result	Record	Site city, state
Regular season
Nov 30, 1979*		vs. No. 6 North Carolina; Big Four Tournament	L 84–97	0–1	Greensboro Coliseum; Greensboro, North Carolina
Dec 1, 1979*		vs. Wake Forest; Big Four Tournament	W 70–65	1–1	Greensboro Coliseum; Greensboro, North Carolina
Dec 6, 1979*		Appalachian State	W 59–53	2–1	Reynolds Coliseum; Raleigh, North Carolina
Dec 17, 1979*		at Nevada	W 82–66	3–1	Centennial Coliseum; Reno, Nevada
Dec 19, 1979*		Campbell	W 100–71	4–1	Reynolds Coliseum; Raleigh, North Carolina
Dec 29, 1979		at Georgia Tech	W 73–62	5–1 (1–0)	Alexander Memorial Coliseum; Atlanta, Georgia
Dec 31, 1979*		at Davidson	W 66–63	6–1	Charlotte Coliseum; Davidson, North Carolina
Jan 2, 1980*		East Carolina	W 83–68	7–1	Reynolds Coliseum; Raleigh, North Carolina
Jan 5, 1980*		Towson	W 95–63	8–1	Reynolds Coliseum; Raleigh, North Carolina
Jan 10, 1980		Maryland	W 67–62	9–1 (2–0)	Reynolds Coliseum; Raleigh, North Carolina
Jan 12, 1980		No. 8 Virginia	W 64–56	11–1 (3–0)	Reynolds Coliseum; Raleigh, North Carolina
Jan 16, 1980	No. 16	at No. 9 North Carolina	L 64–67	11–2 (3–1)	Carmichael Auditorium; Chapel Hill, North Carolina
Jan 19, 1980	No. 16	at No. 5 Duke	L 56–67	11–3 (3–2)	Cameron Indoor Stadium; Durham, North Carolina
Jan 23, 1980		at No. 15 Maryland	L 62–66	11–4 (3–3)	Cole Fieldhouse; College Park, Maryland
Jan 26, 1980		at No. 17 Virginia	L 47–49	11–5 (3–4)	University Hall; Charlottesville, Virginia
Jan 29, 1980		No. 16 Clemson	W 80–67	12–5 (4–4)	Reynolds Coliseum; Raleigh, North Carolina
Feb 1, 1980*		Furman	W 76–56	13–5	Reynolds Coliseum; Raleigh, North Carolina
Feb 2, 1980*		The Citadel	W 57–35	14–5	Reynolds Coliseum; Raleigh, North Carolina
Feb 6, 1980		Georgia Tech	W 60–49	15–5 (5–4)	Reynolds Coliseum; Raleigh, North Carolina
Feb 9, 1980*		at No. 9 Notre Dame	W 63–55	16–5	Joyce Center; Notre Dame, Indiana
Feb 11, 1980		Wake Forest	W 52–40	17–5 (6–4)	Reynolds Coliseum; Raleigh, North Carolina
Feb 13, 1980		No. 16 Duke	W 76–59	18–5 (7–4)	Reynolds Coliseum; Raleigh, North Carolina
Feb 16, 1980		at No. 10 Clemson	L 70–78	18–6 (7–5)	Littlejohn Coliseum; Clemson, South Carolina
Feb 20, 1980		No. 8 North Carolina	W 63–60	19–6 (8–5)	Reynolds Coliseum; Raleigh, North Carolina
Feb 23, 1980		at Wake Forest	W 44–41	20–6 (9–5)	Winston-Salem Memorial Coliseum; Winston-Salem, North Carolina
ACC Tournament
Feb 28, 1980*	No. 19	vs. Duke; Quarterfinals	L 62–68	20–7	Greensboro Coliseum; Greensboro, North Carolina
NCAA Tournament
Mar 8, 1980*	(4 E)	vs. (5 E) Iowa; First round	L 64–77	20–8	Greensboro Coliseum (13,210); Greensboro, North Carolina
*Non-conference game. ^{#}Rankings from AP Poll. (#) Tournament seedings in parentheses. E=East.
