= 1980 ACC men's basketball tournament =

- Classification: Division I
- Season: 1979–80
- Teams: 8
- Site: Greensboro Coliseum; Greensboro, North Carolina
- Champions: Duke (6th title)
- Winning coach: Bill Foster (2nd title)
- MVP: Albert King (Maryland)
- Television: The C.D. Chesley Company

1979–80 ACC men's basketball standings
	Conf.				Overall
Team	W		L	PCT	W		L	PCT
No. 8 Maryland	11	–	3	.786	24	–	7	.774
No. 15 North Carolina	9	–	5	.643	21	–	8	.724
NC State	9	–	5	.643	20	–	8	.714
Clemson	8	–	6	.571	23	–	9	.719
Virginia	7	–	7	.500	24	–	10	.706
No. 14 Duke †	7	–	7	.500	24	–	9	.727
Wake Forest	4	–	10	.286	13	–	14	.481
Georgia Tech	1	–	13	.071	8	–	18	.308
† 1980 ACC tournament winner Rankings from AP Poll

The 1980 Atlantic Coast Conference men's basketball tournament was held in Greensboro, North Carolina, at the Greensboro Coliseum from February 28 through March 1. Duke defeated Maryland, 73–72, to win the championship. Maryland's Albert King was named the tournament MVP, becoming the last player to date (as of the 2018 tournament) to have been named MVP without playing on the tournament winners. Georgia Tech played in this event for the first time as the ACC returned to an eight-team configuration for the first time since the departure of South Carolina in 1971.

== Bracket ==
Quarterfinals; February 28
1	#7 Maryland	51^{OT}
8	Georgia Tech	49
4	#17 Clemson	57
5	Virginia	49
2	#10 North Carolina	75
7	Wake Forest	62
3	#19 NC State	62
6	Duke	68

Semifinals; February 29
1	#7 Maryland	91
4	#17 Clemson	85
2	#10 North Carolina	61
6	Duke	75

Championship Game; March 1
1	#7 Maryland	72
6	Duke	73
