= 1979–80 Duquesne Dukes men's basketball team =

American college basketball season

1979–80 Duquesne Dukes men's basketball

Eastern 8 Regular Season co-champions

NIT, Second Round
- Conference: Eastern Athletic Association
- Record: 18–10 (7–3 EAA)
- Head coach: Mike Rice (2nd season)
- Home arena: Civic Arena

1979–80 Eastern 8 men's basketball standings
	Conf.				Overall
Team	W		L	PCT	W		L	PCT
Villanova †	7	–	3	.700	23	–	8	.742
Duquesne	7	–	3	.700	18	–	10	.643
Rutgers	7	–	3	.700	14	–	14	.500
St. Bonaventure	5	–	5	.500	16	–	11	.593
Pittsburgh	5	–	5	.500	17	–	12	.586
George Washington	5	–	5	.500	15	–	11	.577
West Virginia	4	–	6	.400	15	–	14	.517
UMass	0	–	10	.000	2	–	24	.077
† 1980 Eastern 8 Tournament winner Rankings from AP Poll

The 1979–80 Duquesne Dukes men's basketball team represented Duquesne University in 1979–80 NCAA Division I men's basketball season.

== Roster ==
1979–80 Duquesne Dukes men's basketball team
Players
Coaches

Pos.	#	Name	Height	Weight	Year	Hometown
F	33	Doug Arnold	6 ft 8 in (2.03 m)	210 lb (95 kg)	So	Irwin, Pennsylvania
F	44	Bruce Atkins	6 ft 7 in (2.01 m)	210 lb (95 kg)	So	Wilkinsburg, Pennsylvania
G	40	Jeffery Baldwin	6 ft 4 in (1.93 m)	195 lb (88 kg)	Sr	Braddock, Pennsylvania
G	22	Tom Cvitkovic	6 ft 3 in (1.91 m)	170 lb (77 kg)	So	Ambridge, Pennsylvania
G	20	Ronnie Dixon	6 ft 4 in (1.93 m)	160 lb (73 kg)	Jr	Macon, GA
G	23	John Farrell	6 ft 2 in (1.88 m)	190 lb (86 kg)	Fr	Pittsburgh, Pennsylvania
G	35	Pat Felix	6 ft 4 in (1.93 m)	205 lb (93 kg)	Sr	DuBois, Pennsylvania
G	15	B. B. Flenory	6 ft 2 in (1.88 m)	175 lb (79 kg)	Sr	New Kensington, Pennsylvania
G	21	Paul Kush	6 ft 4 in (1.93 m)	205 lb (93 kg)	So	Levittown, Pennsylvania
C	14	Fred Moon	6 ft 9 in (2.06 m)	205 lb (93 kg)	Sr	Chester, Pennsylvania
F	41	John Moore	6 ft 7 in (2.01 m)	220 lb (100 kg)	Sr	Clairton, Pennsylvania
F	24	Joey Myers	6 ft 7 in (2.01 m)	215 lb (98 kg)	Fr	Lower Burrell, Pennsylvania
G	12	Rod Scott	6 ft 4 in (1.93 m)	185 lb (84 kg)	So	Avalon, Pennsylvania
F	42	John Thomas	6 ft 6 in (1.98 m)	200 lb (91 kg)	Sr	New Haven, Connecticut
C	50	Ricky Tunstall	7 ft 0 in (2.13 m)	235 lb (107 kg)	Fr	Cleveland, Ohio

Head coach

- Mike Rice

Assistant coach(es)

Legend

- (C) Team captain
- (S) Suspended
- (I) Ineligible
- (W) Walk-on
- Injured
- Current redshirt

== Schedule ==
Date time, TV	Rank^{#}	Opponent^{#}	Result	Record	Site city, state
December 1		at George Washington	W 70–64	1–0 (1–0)	Charles E. Smith Center; Washington, D. C.
December 4*		Bowing Green State	W 72–47	2–0 (1–0)	Civic Arena; Pittsburgh, Pennsylvania
December 6*		Western Kentucky	W 84–73	3–0 (1–0)	Civic Arena; Pittsburgh, Pennsylvania
December 8*		at Niagara	W 64–57	4–0 (1–0)	Niagara Falls Convention Center; Niagara Falls, NY
December 11*		Canisius	W 77–62	5–0 (1–0)	Civic Arena; Pittsburgh, Pennsylvania
December 15		at Villanova	W 77–72	6–0 (2–0)	Villanova Field House; Villanova, Pennsylvania
December 20*		at Stetson	W 76–67	7–0 (2–0)	Edmunds Center
December 22*		at Jacksonville	L 54–73	7–1 (2–0)	Jacksonville Memorial Coliseum; Jacksonville, Florida
January 5*		at Detroit	W 72–67	8–1 (2–0)	Calihan Hall; Detroit, Michigan
January 8*		Saint Francis (PA)	W 82–68	9–1 (2–0)	Civic Arena; Pittsburgh, Pennsylvania
January 12*		at Penn State	L 52–62	9–2 (2–0)	Rec Hall; University Park, Pennsylvania
January 14*		Holy Cross	W 103–88	10–2 (2–0)	Civic Arena; Pittsburgh, Pennsylvania
January 16		at Pittsburgh	L 53–55	10–3 (2–1)	Fitzgerald Fieldhouse; Pittsburgh, Pennsylvania
January 19		West Virginia	W 73–66	11–3 (3–1)	Civic Arena; Pittsburgh, Pennsylvania
January 21		UMass	W 88–66	12–3 (4–1)	Civic Arena; Pittsburgh, Pennsylvania
January 24*		at Old Dominion	L 60–65	12–4 (4–1)	Norfolk Scope; Norfolk, Virginia
January 27		Rutgers	L 73–75 ^{OT}	12–5 (4–2)	Civic Arena; Pittsburgh, Pennsylvania
January 29*		Indiana (PA)	W 70–44	13–5 (4–2)	Civic Arena; Pittsburgh, Pennsylvania
January 31*		Penn State	W 56–55	14–5 (4–2)	Civic Arena; Pittsburgh, Pennsylvania
February 2		at St. Bonaventure	L 87–90	14–6 (4–3)	Reilly Center; St. Bonaventure, NY
February 6		at West Virginia	W 49–38	15–6 (5–3)	WVU Coliseum; Morgantown, WV
February 10		Pittsburgh	W 67–66	16–6 (6–3)	Civic Arena; Pittsburgh, Pennsylvania
February 16*		at Old Roberts	L 83–87	16–7 (6–3)	Mabee Center
February 21*		La Salle	L 83–87	16–8 (6–3)	Civic Arena; Pittsburgh, Pennsylvania
February 24*		Dayton	W 85–71	17–8 (6–3)	Civic Arena; Pittsburgh, Pennsylvania
EAAC tournament
February 26	(2)	(7) West Virginia; Quarterfinals	L 87–95	17–9 (6–3)	Civic Arena; Pittsburgh, Pennsylvania
NIT
March 6*		Pittsburgh; First Round	W 65–63	18–9 (6–3)	Civic Arena; Pittsburgh, Pennsylvania
March 10*		St. Peter’s; Second Round	L 33–34	18–10 (6–3)	Civic Arena; Pittsburgh, Pennsylvania
*Non-conference game. ^{#}Rankings from AP Poll. (#) Tournament seedings in parentheses.
