= 1980 Ohio Valley Conference men's basketball tournament =

Men's Basketball Tournament

- Classification: Division I
- Season: 1979–80
- Teams: 4
- Site: E. A. Diddle Arena; Bowling Green, Kentucky
- Champions: Western Kentucky Hilltoppers (9th title)
- Winning coach: Gene Keady (1st title)

1979–80 Ohio Valley Conference men's basketball standings
	Conf.				Overall
Team	W		L	PCT	W		L	PCT
Western Kentucky †	10	–	2	.833	21	–	8	.724
Murray State	10	–	2	.833	23	–	8	.742
Morehead State	7	–	5	.583	15	–	12	.556
Eastern Kentucky	7	–	5	.583	15	–	12	.556
Middle Tennessee	5	–	7	.417	13	–	13	.500
Austin Peay State	2	–	10	.167	8	–	18	.308
Tennessee Tech	1	–	11	.083	5	–	21	.192
† 1980 OVC tournament winner Rankings from AP poll

The 1980 Ohio Valley Conference men's basketball tournament was the postseason men's basketball tournament of the Ohio Valley Conference during the 1979–80 NCAA Division I men's basketball season. It was held February 28–29, 1980. The semifinals and finals took place at E. A. Diddle Arena in Bowling Green, Kentucky. Two seed Western Kentucky won the tournament, defeating Murray State in the championship game, and received the Ohio Valley's automatic bid to the NCAA tournament. The Hilltoppers drew a 10 seed in the Mideast region, facing the 7 seed Virginia Tech Hokies.

== Format ==
The top four eligible men's basketball teams in the Ohio Valley Conference received a berth in the conference tournament. After the 14-game conference season, teams were seeded by conference record. The bottom four teams in the standings did not participate.

== Bracket ==
Semifinals; February 28
1	Murray State	77
4	Morehead State	74
3	Eastern Kentucky	83
2	Western Kentucky	84

Finals; February 29
1	Murray State	51
2	Western Kentucky	54
