= 1980 Eastern 8 men's basketball tournament =

- Classification: Division I
- Season: 1979–80
- Teams: 8
- Site: Civic Arena; Pittsburgh
- Champions: Villanova (2nd title)
- Winning coach: Rollie Massimino (2nd title)
- MVP: Lowes Moore (West Virginia)

1979–80 Eastern 8 men's basketball standings
	Conf.				Overall
Team	W		L	PCT	W		L	PCT
Villanova †	7	–	3	.700	23	–	8	.742
Duquesne	7	–	3	.700	18	–	10	.643
Rutgers	7	–	3	.700	14	–	14	.500
St. Bonaventure	5	–	5	.500	16	–	11	.593
Pittsburgh	5	–	5	.500	17	–	12	.586
George Washington	5	–	5	.500	15	–	11	.577
West Virginia	4	–	6	.400	15	–	14	.517
UMass	0	–	10	.000	2	–	24	.077
† 1980 Eastern 8 Tournament winner Rankings from AP Poll

The 1980 Eastern 8 men's basketball tournament was held in Pittsburgh, Pennsylvania, at the Civic Arena from February 26, 1980, to March 1, 1980 (first round games at campus sites). Villanova defeated West Virginia 74-62 to win their second tournament championship. Lowes Moore of West Virginia was named the Most Outstanding Player of the tournament.

== Bracket ==
Quarterfinals; February 26, 1980
1	Villanova	85
8	Massachusetts	63
4	Pittsburgh	77
5	George Washington	68
2	Duquesne	87
7	West Virginia	95
3	Rutgers	76
6	St. Bonaventure	74

Semi-Finals; February 29, 1980
1	Villanova	72
4	Pittsburgh	59
7	West Virginia	77
3	Rutgers	66

Finals; March 1, 1980
1	Villanova	74
7	West Virginia	62
