= 1979–80 Alcorn State Braves basketball team =

American college basketball season

1979–80 Alcorn State Braves basketball

SWAC tournament champions

NCAA tournament
- Conference: Southwestern Athletic Conference
- Record: 28–2 (10–0 SWAC)
- Head coach: Davey Whitney (11th season)
- Home arena: Physical Education Complex

1979–80 SWAC men's basketball standings
	Conf.				Overall
Team	W		L	PCT	W		L	PCT
Alcorn State †	8	–	0	1.000	28	–	2	.933
Grambling	6	–	4	.600	22	–	8	.733
Jackson State	3	–	5	.375	15	–	14	.517
Southern	3	–	6	.333	14	–	15	.483
Texas Southern	2	–	7	.222	9	–	17	.346
Prairie View		–		–	10	–	18	.357
Mississippi Valley State		–		–	3	–	24	.111
† 1980 SWAC tournament winner Rankings from AP Poll

The 1979–80 Alcorn State Braves basketball team represented Alcorn State University during the 1979–80 NCAA Division I men's basketball season. The Braves, led by head coach Davey Whitney, played their home games at the Davey Whitney Complex and were members of the Southwestern Athletic Conference. They finished the season 28–2, 8–0 in SWAC. They won the SWAC tournament to receive an automatic bid to the NCAA tournament as No. 8 seed in the Midwest region. The Braves defeated No. 9 seed South Alabama, 70–62, and then played No. 1 seed LSU tough before falling, 98–88.

== Roster ==
1979–80 Alcorn State Braves men's basketball team
Players	Coaches
Pos. / # / Name / Height / Weight / Year / Hometown; F / / Larry Smith / 6 ft 8 in (2.03 m) / 210 lb (95 kg) / Sr / Simmons / Rolling Fork, Mississippi	Head coach: Davey Whitney; Assistant coach(es) Legend: (C) Team captain; (S) Suspended; (I) Ineligible; (W) Walk-on; Injured; Current redshirt

== Schedule and results ==
Date time, TV	Rank^{#}	Opponent^{#}	Result	Record	Site (attendance) city, state
Regular season
Nov 30, 1979*		vs. Southern Mississippi	W 77–71	1–0	Mississippi Coast Coliseum; Biloxi, Mississippi
Dec 1, 1979*		vs. Mississippi State	L 80–83	1–1	Mississippi Coast Coliseum; Biloxi, Mississippi
Dec 3, 1979*		at North Carolina A&T	W 108–86	2–1	Corbett Sports Center; Greensboro, North Carolina
Dec 8, 1979*		Little Rock	W 95–55	3–1	Physical Education Complex; Lorman, Mississippi
Dec 10, 1979*		at Howard	W 95–48	4–1	Burr Gymnasium; Washington, D.C.
Dec 13, 1979*		South Carolina State	W 103–68	5–1	Physical Education Complex; Lorman, Mississippi
Dec 28, 1979*		at South Alabama	W 82–77	8–1	Mobile Municipal Auditorium; Mobile, Alabama
SWAC tournament
Mar 1, 1980*	(1)	at (4) Southern; Semifinals	W 116–92	26–1	Mississippi Coliseum; Jackson, Mississippi
Mar 2, 1980*	(1)	vs. (2) Grambling; Championship game	W 83–61	27–1	Mississippi Coliseum; Jackson, Mississippi
NCAA tournament
Mar 7, 1980*	(8 MW)	vs. (9 MW) South Alabama; First round	W 70–62	28–1	UNT Coliseum; Denton, Texas
Mar 9, 1980*	(8 MW)	vs. (1 MW) No. 3 Louisiana State; Second round	L 88–98	28–2	UNT Coliseum; Denton, Texas
*Non-conference game. ^{#}Rankings from AP Poll. (#) Tournament seedings in parentheses. MW=Midwest. All times are in Central Time.
