= 1980 Midwestern City Conference men's basketball tournament =

- Classification: Division I
- Season: 1979–80
- Teams: 6
- Site: Roberts Municipal Stadium; Evansville, IN
- Champions: Oral Roberts (1st title)
- Winning coach: Ken Hayes (1st title)
- MVP: Calvin Garrett (Oral Roberts)
- Midwestern City Conference men's basketball tournaments

1979–80 Midwestern City Conference men's basketball standings
| | Conf. | | | | Overall |
| Team | W | | L | PCT | W | | L | PCT |
|---|---|---|---|---|---|---|---|---|
| Loyola-Chicago | 5 | – | 0 | 1.000 | 19 | – | 10 | .655 |
| Oral Roberts † | 4 | – | 1 | .800 | 18 | – | 10 | .643 |
| Oklahoma City | 3 | – | 2 | .600 | 13 | – | 15 | .464 |
| Butler | 2 | – | 3 | .400 | 12 | – | 15 | .444 |
| Evansville | 1 | – | 4 | .200 | 18 | – | 10 | .643 |
| Xavier | 0 | – | 5 | .000 | 8 | – | 18 | .308 |
† 1980 MCC tournament winner

The 1980 Midwestern City Conference men's basketball tournament (now known as the Horizon League men's basketball tournament) was held February 29 to March 2 at Roberts Municipal Stadium in Evansville, Indiana. This was the first edition of the tournament.

Oral Roberts topped Loyola–Chicago in the inaugural championship game, 103–93, to win their first MCC/Horizon League men's basketball tournament.

The Golden Eagles; however, did not receive a bid to the 1980 NCAA tournament.

== Format ==
All six conference members participated in the tournament and were seeded based on their regular-season conference records. The top two teams were given byes into the semifinal round while the remaining four teams were placed into the initial quarterfinal round.

== Bracket ==
Quarterfinals; Friday, February 29
5 | Evansville | 80
4 | Butler | 67
3 | Oklahoma City | 102
6 | Xavier | 93

Semifinals; Saturday, March 1
1 | Loyola–Chicago | 81
5 | Evansville | 78
3 | Oklahoma City | 100
2 | Oral Roberts | 101

Championship; Sunday, March 2
1 | Loyola–Chicago | 93
2 | Oral Roberts | 103
