= 1979–80 Yale Bulldogs men's basketball team =

American college basketball season

1979–80 Yale Bulldogs men's basketball
- Conference: Ivy League
- Record: 16–10 (8–6 Ivy)
- Head coach: Ray Carazo (5th season)
- Home arena: John J. Lee Amphitheater

1979–80 Ivy League men's basketball standings
	Conf.				Overall
Team	W		L	PCT	W		L	PCT
Penn	11	–	3	.786	17	–	12	.586
Princeton	11	–	3	.786	15	–	15	.500
Brown	9	–	5	.643	12	–	14	.462
Yale	8	–	6	.571	16	–	10	.615
Harvard	6	–	8	.429	11	–	15	.423
Columbia	5	–	9	.357	10	–	16	.385
Dartmouth	3	–	11	.214	6	–	20	.231
Cornell	3	–	11	.214	5	–	19	.208
Rankings from AP Poll

The 1979–80 Yale Bulldogs men's basketball team represented Yale University during the 1979–80 men's college basketball season. The Bulldogs, led by 5th year head coach Ray Carazo, played their home games at John J. Lee Amphitheater of the Payne Whitney Gymnasium and were members of the Ivy League. They finished the season 16–10, 8–6 in Ivy League play to finish in fourth place.

== Roster ==
1979–80 Yale Bulldogs men's basketball team
Players
Coaches

Pos.	#	Name	Height	Weight	Year	Hometown
G	15	Joe Conway	6 ft 3 in (1.91 m)	175 lb (79 kg)	Jr	New Jersey
F	10	Anthony Curry	6 ft 5 in (1.96 m)	175 lb (79 kg)	Sr	New York, New York
C	32	Tim Daaleman	6 ft 8 in (2.03 m)	220 lb (100 kg)	So	Westfield, New Jersey
C	21	Andy Fleming	6 ft 8 in (2.03 m)	200 lb (91 kg)	Sr	Wallingford, Connecticut
G	5	Mike Hill	6 ft 1 in (1.85 m)	180 lb (82 kg)	Fr	Uncasville, Connecticut
G	20	Gavin Jackson	6 ft 1 in (1.85 m)	170 lb (77 kg)	Sr	New Haven, Connecticut
F	4	Lamar Jeffries	6 ft 4 in (1.93 m)	190 lb (86 kg)	Fr	Canton, Ohio
F	24	Joe Jolson	6 ft 5 in (1.96 m)	190 lb (86 kg)	Sr	Cincinnati, Ohio
F	25	Steve Leondis	6 ft 4 in (1.93 m)	190 lb (86 kg)	Fr	Massapequa, New York
F	14	Frank Maturo	6 ft 0 in (1.83 m)	170 lb (77 kg)	Sr	West Haven, Connecticut
G	12	Regis O'Keefe	6 ft 0 in (1.83 m)	160 lb (73 kg)	Jr	Pittsburgh, Pennsylvania
F	22	Doug Stratton	6 ft 4 in (1.93 m)	180 lb (82 kg)	Jr	Osmond, Nebraska
G	11	Weldon Tisdale	5 ft 11 in (1.8 m)	175 lb (79 kg)	So	Tulsa, Oklahoma
G	10	Larry Zigerelli	5 ft 9 in (1.75 m)	155 lb (70 kg)	Sr	Monaca, Pennsylvania

Head coach

- Ray Carazo

Assistant coach(es)

- Don Burns
- Don Feeley

Legend

- (C) Team captain
- (S) Suspended
- (I) Ineligible
- (W) Walk-on
- Injured
- Current redshirt

Roster

== Schedule ==
Date time, TV	Rank^{#}	Opponent^{#}	Result	Record	Site city, state
December 1*		at Connecticut	L 75–83	0–1	Hartford Civic Center; Hartford, Connecticut
December 4*		Fordham	W 106–102 ^{2OT}	1–1	Payne Whitney Gymnasium; New Haven, CT
December 8*		Holy Cross	L 87–97	1–2	Payne Whitney Gymnasium; New Haven, CT
December 10		at Brown	W 69–58	2–2 (1–0)	Marvel Gymnasium; Providence, RI
December 27*		at U. S. International	L 79–83	2–3 (1–0)	
January 5*		Middlebury	W 114–74	3–3 (1–0)	Payne Whitney Gymnasium; New Haven, CT
January 11		at Princeton	L 57–65	3–4 (1–1)	Jadwin Gymnasium; Princeton, NJ
January 12		at Penn	L 64–84	3–5 (1–2)	The Palestra; Philadelphia, Pennsylvania
January 15*		Army	W 64–63	4–5 (1–2)	Payne Whitney Gymnasium; New Haven, CT
January 19*		at Navy	W 60–58	5–5 (1–2)	Halsey Field House; Annapolis, Maryland
January 23*		New Hampshire	W 81–62	6–5 (1–2)	Payne Whitney Gymnasium; New Haven, CT
January 26*		Fairfield	W 77–72	7–5 (1–2)	Payne Whitney Gymnasium; New Haven, CT
January 29		Harvard	W 86–75	8–5 (2–2)	Payne Whitney Gymnasium; New Haven, CT
January 30*		Colgate	W 83–68	9–5 (2–2)	Payne Whitney Gymnasium; New Haven, CT
February 2		Dartmouth	W 80–67	10–5 (3–2)	Payne Whitney Gymnasium; New Haven, CT
February 4*		at North Carolina	L 74–85	10–6 (3–2)	Carmichael Arena; Chapel Hill, NC
February 8		at Cornell	W 75–70	11–6 (4–2)	Barton Hall; Ithaca, NY
February 9		at Columbia	W 94–88	12–6 (5–2)	Levien Gymnasium; Morningside Heights, Manhattan
February 12		Brown	W 84–74	13–6 (6–2)	Payne Whitney Gymnasium; New Haven, CT
February 15		Penn	L 68–73	13–7 (6–3)	Payne Whitney Gymnasium; New Haven, CT
February 16		Princeton	L 57–61	13–8 (6–4)	Payne Whitney Gymnasium; New Haven, CT
February 18*		Union	W 68–62	14–8 (6–4)	Payne Whitney Gymnasium; New Haven, CT
February 22		Columbia	W 84–81	15–8 (7–4)	Payne Whitney Gymnasium; New Haven, CT
February 23		Cornell	L 93–98 ^{OT}	15–9 (7–5)	Payne Whitney Gymnasium; New Haven, CT
February 29		at Dartmouth	W 55–51	16–9 (8–5)	Alumni Gymnasium; Hanover, NH
March 1		at Harvard	L 85–86	16–10 (8–6)	Malkin Athletic Center; Cambridge, Massachusetts
*Non-conference game. ^{#}Rankings from AP Poll. (#) Tournament seedings in parentheses.
