= 1979–80 UAB Blazers men's basketball team =

American college basketball season

1979–80 UAB Blazers men's basketball

NIT, First Round
- Conference: Sun Belt Conference
- Record: 18–12 (10–4 Sun Belt)
- Head coach: Gene Bartow
- Assistant coaches: Oscar Catlin; Robert Corn; Lee Hunt
- Home arena: BJCC Arena

1979–80 Sun Belt Conference men's basketball standings
| | Conf. | | | | Overall |
| Team | W | | L | PCT | W | | L | PCT |
|---|---|---|---|---|---|---|---|---|
| South Alabama | 12 | – | 2 | .857 | 23 | – | 6 | .793 |
| UAB | 10 | – | 4 | .714 | 18 | – | 12 | .600 |
| Jacksonville | 10 | – | 4 | .714 | 20 | – | 9 | .690 |
| UNC Charlotte | 9 | – | 5 | .643 | 15 | – | 12 | .556 |
| VCU † | 8 | – | 6 | .571 | 18 | – | 12 | .600 |
| Georgia State | 4 | – | 10 | .286 | 6 | – | 21 | .222 |
| New Orleans | 2 | – | 12 | .143 | 5 | – | 21 | .192 |
| South Florida | 1 | – | 13 | .071 | 6 | – | 21 | .222 |
† 1980 Sun Belt Conference tournament winner Rankings from AP Poll

The 1979–80 UAB Blazers men's basketball team represented the University of Alabama at Birmingham (UAB) in the 1979–80 NCAA Division I men's basketball season. This was head coach Gene Bartow's second season at UAB. The Blazers competed in the Sun Belt Conference and played their home games at the BJCC Arena. They finished the season 18–12, 10–4 in Sun Belt play and lost in the finals of the conference tournament to VCU. They were invited to the 1980 National Invitation Tournament (NIT) only to fall in the first round to Southwestern Louisiana.

== Roster ==
| Name | Hometown |
|---|---|
| Tim Almquist | Forest Lake, Minnesota, United States |
| Raymond Gause | Memphis, Tennessee, United States |
| Chris Giles | Birmingham, Alabama, United States |
| George Jones | Memphis, Tennessee, United States |
| Greg Leet | Flat River, Missouri, United States |
| Tony Mabrey | Albertville, Alabama, United States |
| Glenn Marcus | Alabaster, Alabama, United States |
| Bill McCammon | Palm Springs, California, United States |
| Leon Morris | Memphis, Tennessee, United States |
| Oliver Robinson | Birmingham, Alabama, United States |
| Stan Scales | Chicago, Illinois, United States |
| Scott Simcik | Simi Valley, California, United States |
| Donnie Speer | Sylacauga, Alabama, United States |
| Larry Spicer | Memphis, Tennessee, United States |

== Schedule and results ==
UAB finished the regular season tied for second place in the Sun Belt, and as runner-up in the conference tournament. The Blazers competed in the postseason for the first time in the history of the program with an appearance in the NIT.

| Date time, TV | Opponent | Result | Record | Site (attendance) city, state |
|---|---|---|---|---|
| 12/1/1979* no, no | Whittier | W 90–67 | 1–0 | BJCC Arena (6,283); Birmingham, Alabama |
| 12/5/1979 no, no | at New Orleans | W 82–73 | 2–0 | Human Performance Center (902); New Orleans |
| 12/8/1979* no, no | at Ole Miss | L 66–67 | 2–1 | Tad Smith Coliseum (7,958); Oxford, Mississippi |
| 12/12/1979* no, no | Washington State | W 86–67 | 3–1 | BJCC Arena (6,423); Birmingham, AL |
| 12/15/1979 no, no | at Georgia State | W 100–73 | 4–1 | GSU Sports Arena (570); Atlanta |
| 12/20/1979* no, no | at Oklahoma City | W 89–73 | 5–1 | Frederickson Fieldhouse (2,010); Oklahoma City, Oklahoma |
| 12/22/1979* no, no | at Nebraska | L 84–92 ^{4OT} | 5–2 | Bob Devaney Sports Center (6,973); Lincoln, Nebraska |
| 12/28/1979* no, no | Missouri–Rolla; UAB Classic | W 100–66 | 6–2 | BJCC Arena (5,179); Birmingham, AL |
| 12/29/1979* no, no | Drexel; UAB Classic | W 100–60 | 7–2 | BJCC Arena (3,652); Birmingham, AL |
| 1/3/1980 no, no | Georgia State | W 75–62 | 8–2 | BJCC Arena (4,178); Birmingham, AL |
| 1/5/1980* no, no | Air Force | W 65–51 | 9–2 | BJCC Arena (9,448); Birmingham, AL |
| 1/7/1980 no, no | VCU | W 82–71 | 10–2 | BJCC Arena (4,041); Birmingham, AL |
| 1/10/1980 no, no | at South Florida | W 92–83 | 11–2 | Curtis Hixon Hall (336); Tampa, Florida |
| 1/12/1980* no, no | Iona | L 65–70 | 11–3 | BJCC Arena (8,894); Birmingham, AL |
| 1/16/1980* no, no | at St. Louis | L 76–84 | 11–4 | Kiel Auditorium (3,272); St. Louis, Missouri |
| 1/19/1980 no, no | at Jacksonville | L 52–62 | 11–5 | Jacksonville Coliseum (8,671); Jacksonville, Florida |
| 1/22/1980* no, no | DePaul | L 54–57 | 11–6 | BJCC Arena (17,309); Birmingham, AL |
| 1/24/1980 no, no | at South Alabama | W 70–62 | 12–6 | Mobile Civic Center (10,513); Mobile, AL |
| 1/28/1980 no, no | UNC Charlotte | W 84–76 | 13–6 | BJCC Arena (6,417); Birmingham, AL |
| 2/2/1980 no, no | Jacksonville | W 72–68 | 14–6 | BJCC Arena (9,265); Birmingham, AL |
| 2/5/1980 no, no | at UNC Charlotte | L 68–73 | 14–7 | Independence Arena (4,021); Charlotte, North Carolina |
| 2/10/1980 no, no | at VCU | L 75–90 | 14–8 | Richmond Coliseum (4,600); Richmond, Virginia |
| 2/14/1980 no, no | South Florida | W 78–70 | 15–8 | BJCC Arena (5,046); Birmingham, AL |
| 2/16/1980 no, no | New Orleans | W 86–75 | 16–8 | BJCC Arena (2,547); Birmingham, AL |
| 2/17/1980 no, no | South Alabama | L 65–66 | 16–9 | BJCC Arena (8,352); Birmingham, AL |
| 2/20/1980* no, no | Florida State | L 87–89 | 16–10 | Tully Gymnasium (2,081); Tallahassee, Florida |
1980 Sun Belt Conference men's basketball tournament
| 2/23/1980 no, no | vs. New Orleans | W 85–75 | 17–10 | Independence Arena (2,547); Charlotte, North Carolina |
| 2/24/1980 no, no | vs. Jacksonville | W 64–60 | 18–10 | Independence Arena (2,624); Charlotte, North Carolina |
| 2/25/1980 no, no | vs. VCU | L 88–105 | 18–11 | Independence Arena (2,519); Charlotte, North Carolina |
1980 National Invitation Tournament
| 3/6/1980 no, no | at Southwestern Louisiana | L 72–74 | 18–12 | Blackham Coliseum (8,124); Lafayette, Louisiana |
*Non-conference game. (#) Tournament seedings in parentheses. All times are in Central Time.
