= 1980 TAAC men's basketball tournament =

- Classification: Division I
- Season: 1979–80
- Teams: 7
- Site: Fant–Ewing Coliseum; Monroe, LA
- Champions: Centenary (1st title)
- Winning coach: Tommy Canterbury (1st title)
- MVP: George Lett (Centenary)
- TAAC men's basketball tournaments

The 1980 Trans America Athletic Conference men's basketball tournament (now known as the ASUN men's basketball tournament) was held February 28–March 2, 1980 at the Fant–Ewing Coliseum in Monroe, Louisiana.

Centenary upset top-seeded Northeast Louisiana in the championship game, 79–77, to win their first TAAC/Atlantic Sun men's basketball tournament. However, the Gentlemen did not ultimately receive a bid to the 1980 NCAA tournament or the 1980 NIT.

== Bracket ==
Quarterfinals; Thursday, February 28
5	Samford	68
4	Mercer	74
3	Centenary	76
6	Houston Baptist	69
7	Hardin–Simmons	67
2	Pan American	83

Semifinals; Saturday, March 1
1	Northeast Louisiana	102
4	Mercer	71
3	Centenary	88
2	Pan American	84

Championship; Sunday, March 2
1	Northeast Louisiana	77
3	Centenary	79
Third place Sunday, March 2
4	Mercer	90
2	Texas–Pan American	78
