= 1979–80 Princeton Tigers men's basketball team =

American college basketball season

1979–80 Princeton Tigers men's basketball

Ivy League Co-Champion

Ivy League one-game playoff, Lost
- Conference: Ivy League
- Record: 15–15 (11–4, 1st-t Ivy)
- Head coach: Pete Carril (13th season)
- Captain: John W. Rogers, Jr.
- Home arena: Jadwin Gymnasium

1979–80 Ivy League men's basketball standings
| | Conf. | | | | Overall |
| Team | W | | L | PCT | W | | L | PCT |
|---|---|---|---|---|---|---|---|---|
| Penn | 11 | – | 3 | .786 | 17 | – | 12 | .586 |
| Princeton | 11 | – | 3 | .786 | 15 | – | 15 | .500 |
| Brown | 9 | – | 5 | .643 | 12 | – | 14 | .462 |
| Yale | 8 | – | 6 | .571 | 16 | – | 10 | .615 |
| Harvard | 6 | – | 8 | .429 | 11 | – | 15 | .423 |
| Columbia | 5 | – | 9 | .357 | 10 | – | 16 | .385 |
| Dartmouth | 3 | – | 11 | .214 | 6 | – | 20 | .231 |
| Cornell | 3 | – | 11 | .214 | 5 | – | 19 | .208 |
Rankings from AP Poll

The 1979–80 Princeton Tigers men's basketball team represented Princeton University in intercollegiate college basketball during the 1979–80 NCAA Division I men's basketball season. The head coach was Pete Carril and the team captain was John W. Rogers, Jr. The team played its home games in the Jadwin Gymnasium on the University campus in Princeton, New Jersey. The team was the co-champion of the Ivy League, but lost a one-game playoff and failed to earn an invitation to either the 1980 NCAA Men's Division I Basketball Tournament or the 1980 National Invitation Tournament.

The team played a schedule that included eventual national champion Louisville, other members of the 48-team NCAA tournament field such as #3 seed St. John's, #4 seed Duke and #8 Villanova as well as the Big Ten Conference's Michigan State and the Big East Conference's Seton Hall. The team recovered from a slow start in which it lost its first five and eleven of its first thirteen games to post a 15–15 overall record and an 11–4 conference record. After splitting the regular season series one win apiece on home game victories and finishing tied with identical 11–3 conference records, Princeton and Penn Penn faced each other in a March 4, 1980, one-game Ivy League playoff game. Princeton lost the game which was held at the Kirby Sports Center at Lafayette College in Easton, Pennsylvania, by a 50–49 margin, thus giving Penn the Ivy League Championship and an invitation to the NCAA Men's Division I Basketball Tournament. Princeton would avenge this loss the following year when the two teams finished tied for the conference regular season title again. The team was led by first team All-Ivy League selection Randy Melville.
