= 1979–80 Duke Blue Devils men's basketball team =

American college basketball season

1979–80 Duke Blue Devils men's basketball

ACC tournament champions

NCAA tournament, regional final
- Conference: Atlantic Coast Conference

Ranking
- Coaches: No. 16
- AP: No. 14
- Record: 24–9 (7–7 ACC)
- Head coach: Bill Foster (6th season)
- Home arena: Cameron Indoor Stadium

1979–80 ACC men's basketball standings
	Conf.				Overall
Team	W		L	PCT	W		L	PCT
No. 8 Maryland	11	–	3	.786	24	–	7	.774
No. 15 North Carolina	9	–	5	.643	21	–	8	.724
NC State	9	–	5	.643	20	–	8	.714
Clemson	8	–	6	.571	23	–	9	.719
Virginia	7	–	7	.500	24	–	10	.706
No. 14 Duke †	7	–	7	.500	24	–	9	.727
Wake Forest	4	–	10	.286	13	–	14	.481
Georgia Tech	1	–	13	.071	8	–	18	.308
† 1980 ACC tournament winner Rankings from AP Poll

The 1979–80 Duke Blue Devils men's basketball team represented Duke University during the 1979–80 college basketball season. This was the sixth and final season for head coach Bill Foster, as it was announced on March 3, 1980, that he would join the South Carolina Gamecocks the following season.

Mike Krzyzewski, the head coach of the Army Black Knights the previous five seasons, succeeded Foster.

== Roster ==
1979–80 Duke Blue Devils men's basketball team
Players
Coaches

Pos.	#	Name	Height	Weight	Year	Hometown
F	20	Gene Banks	6 ft 7 in (2.01 m)	205 lb (93 kg)	Jr	Philadelphia, PA
G	21	Bob Bender	6 ft 2 in (1.88 m)	175 lb (79 kg)	Sr	Crown Point, IN
		Jim Corrigan	5 ft 11 in (1.8 m)	—	Sr
F	33	Kenny Dennard	6 ft 7 in (2.01 m)	200 lb (91 kg)	Jr	Walnut Cove, NC
G	22	Tom Emma	6 ft 2 in (1.88 m)	175 lb (79 kg)	Fr	Manhasset, NY
G	14	Chip Engelland	6 ft 4 in (1.93 m)	180 lb (82 kg)	Fr	Pacific Palisades, CA
C	43	Mike Gminski	6 ft 11 in (2.11 m)	—	Sr	Monroe, CT
F	24	Larry Linney	6 ft 4 in (1.93 m)	190 lb (86 kg)	Jr	Asheville, NC
G/F	30	Jim Suddath	6 ft 6 in (1.98 m)	190 lb (86 kg)	Jr	East Point, GA
G	12	Vince Taylor	6 ft 5 in (1.96 m)	180 lb (82 kg)	So	Lexington, KY
F	31	Mike Tissaw	6 ft 8 in (2.03 m)	210 lb (95 kg)	Fr	Fairfax, VA
F	41	Allen Williams	6 ft 8 in (2.03 m)	220 lb (100 kg)	Fr	Princeton, WV

Head coach

Bill Foster

Assistant coach(es)

Legend

- (C) Team captain
- (S) Suspended
- (I) Ineligible
- (W) Walk-on
- Injured
- Current redshirt

Compiled from multiple sources

== Schedule ==
Date time, TV	Rank^{#}	Opponent^{#}	Result	Record	Site city, state
November 17*	No. 3	vs. No. 2 Kentucky; Tip Off Classic	W 82–76 ^{OT}	1–0	Springfield Civic Center; Springfield, MA
November 30*	No. 3	vs. Wake Forest; Big Four Tournament	W 72–70	2–0	Greensboro Coliseum; Greensboro, NC
December 1*	No. 3	vs. No. 6 North Carolina; Big Four Tournament	W 86–74	3–0	Greensboro Coliseum; Greensboro, NC
December 5*	No. 2	Princeton	W 81–45	4–0	Cameron Indoor Stadium; Durham, NC
December 8*	No. 2	East Carolina	W 92–73	5–0	Cameron Indoor Stadium; Durham, NC
December 11*	No. 2	at Pennsylvania	W 70–67	6–0	Palestra; Philadelphia, PA
December 21*	No. 1	vs. Boston College; Industrial National Classic	W 70–64 ^{OT}	7–0	Providence Civic Center; Providence, RI
December 22*	No. 1	at Providence; Industrial National Classic	W 82–78	8–0	Providence Civic Center; Providence, RI
December 28*	No. 1	Vermont; Iron Duke Classic	W 92–67	9–0	Cameron Indoor Stadium; Durham, NC
December 29*	No. 1	Cincinnati; Iron Duke Classic	W 87–75 ^{OT}	10–0	Cameron Indoor Stadium; Durham, NC
January 5*	No. 1	Colgate	W 73–44	11–0	Cameron Indoor Stadium; Durham, NC
January 7	No. 1	Georgia Tech	W 55–42	12–0 (1–0)	Cameron Indoor Stadium; Durham, NC
January 9	No. 1	at No. 18 Clemson	L 82–87 ^{OT}	12–1 (1–1)	Littlejohn Coliseum; Clemson, SC
January 12	No. 1	No. 15 North Carolina; Carolina–Duke rivalry	L 67–82	12–2 (1–2)	Cameron Indoor Stadium; Durham, NC
January 16	No. 5	Wake Forest	W 67–66	13–2 (2–2)	Cameron Indoor Stadium; Durham, NC
January 19	No. 5	No. 16 N.C. State	W 67–56	14–2 (3–2)	Cameron Indoor Stadium; Durham, NC
January 21	No. 5	at Georgia Tech	W 56–49	15–2 (4–2)	McCamish Pavilion; Atlanta, GA
January 23	No. 3	Virginia	L 84–90	15–3 (4–3)	Cameron Indoor Stadium; Durham, NC
January 26*	No. 3	Pittsburgh	W 78–69	16–3	Fitzgerald Field House; Pittsburgh, PA
January 30	No. 5	at Wake Forest	W 82–61	17–3 (4–4)	LJVM Coliseum; Winston-Salem, NC
February 2	No. 5	at No. 12 Maryland	L 82–101	17–4 (5–4)	Cole Field House; College Park, MD
February 6	No. 10	at No. 18 Virginia	L 69–73	17–5 (5–5)	University Hall; Charlottesville, VA
February 10*	No. 10	vs. Marquette	L 77–80	17–6	MECCA Arena; Madison, WI
February 13	No. 16	at N.C. State	L 59–76	17–7 (5–6)	Reynolds Coliseum; Raleigh, NC
February 16	No. 16	No. 8 Maryland	W 66–61	18–7 (6–6)	Cameron Indoor Stadium; Durham, NC
February 20	No. 17	No. 12 Clemson	W 87–82 ^{OT}	19–7 (7–6)	Cameron Indoor Stadium; Durham, NC
February 23	No. 17	at No. 8 North Carolina	L 71–96	19–8 (7–7)	Carmichael Auditorium; Chapel Hill, NC
February 28*		vs. No. 19 N.C. State; ACC tournament • quarterfinals	W 68–62	20–8	Greensboro Coliseum; Greensboro, NC
February 29*		vs. No. 10 North Carolina; ACC tournament • semifinals	W 75–61	21–8	Greensboro Coliseum; Greensboro, NC
March 1*		vs. No. 7 Maryland; ACC tournament • final	W 73–72	22–8	Greensboro Coliseum; Greensboro, NC
March 8*	No. 14	vs. Pennsylvania; NCAA tournament • second round	W 52–42	23–8	Mackey Arena; West Lafayette, IN
March 13*	No. 14	at No. 4 Kentucky; NCAA tournament • regional semifinals	W 55–54	24–8	Rupp Arena; Lexington, KY
March 15*	No. 14	vs. No. 20 Purdue; NCAA tournament • regional final	L 60–68	24–9	Rupp Arena; Lexington, KY
*Non-conference game. ^{#}Rankings from AP Poll. (#) Tournament seedings in parentheses.

Compiled from multiple sources
