= Harry Booth (coach) =

American college baseball and basketball coach (1940–2022)

Biographical details
- Born: January 19, 1940; Philadelphia, Pennsylvania, U.S.
- Died: September 12, 2022 (aged 82)

Playing career

Baseball
- 1959–1962: Saint Joseph's

Basketball
- 1959–1962: Saint Joseph's

Coaching career (HC unless noted)

Baseball
- 1965–1974: Saint Joseph's

Basketball
- 1974–1978: Saint Joseph's

Head coaching record
- Overall: Baseball: 140–80–5 (.633); Basketball: 44–61 (.419)

Harry Booth (January 19, 1940 – September 12, 2022) was an American college baseball and college basketball head coach for the Saint Joseph's Hawks, representing Saint Joseph's University. He also attended Saint Joseph's and played for their baseball and basketball teams.

== Early life and playing career ==
Booth was born on January 19, 1940, in South Philadelphia. He graduated from Bishop Neumann High School and then attended Saint Joseph's University. At Saint Joseph's, Booth played for the Saint Joseph's Hawks baseball as a center fielder, twice being named to the All-Middle Atlantic Conference team. In his junior and senior years, Booth led his team in runs scored, stolen bases, and extra-base hits. He walked-on to the Saint Joseph's Hawks men's basketball team, playing in three consecutive NCAA Division I men's basketball tournaments as a reserve. Saint Joseph made it to the Final Four in the 1961 basketball tournament. Booth was a captain for both the baseball and basketball teams. He graduated from Saint Joseph's in 1962.

== Coaching career ==
After he graduated, Booth was hired as the varsity men's basketball coach at Bishop McDevitt High School in Wyncote, Pennsylvania, in July 1962. He also became an assistant coach for Saint Joseph's baseball team. Saint Joseph's named Booth the head coach of their freshman baseball team in March 1964, and then as the head coach of the varsity baseball team in August 1964. Booth coached the baseball team from 1965 to 1974 and had a 140–80–5 record. His .633 winning percentage is the highest for all St. Joseph's baseball coaches.

In 1966, Booth became an assistant coach for the varsity men's basketball team. In 1970, he was named the head coach of Saint Joseph's freshmen men's basketball team. After the firing of Jack McKinney, the head coach of Saint Joseph's varsity basketball team, Booth succeeded him, while stepping down as head coach of the baseball team. Booth coached the men's basketball team through the 1978 season, after which he was fired. He coached the Hawks' men's basketball team to a 44–61 (.419) record. Booth joined the Villanova Wildcats men's basketball team as a volunteer assistant coach in 1981. He coached for Villanova when they won the 1985 NCAA Division I men's basketball tournament. He also worked in sales. Booth left Villanova in 1986 to focus on his business career.

Saint Joseph's inducted Booth into their Baseball Hall of Fame in 1997. The Harry Booth Award, given to a member of the baseball team for outstanding contributions, was inaugurated in 2010.

== Personal life ==
Booth and his wife, Toni, had four children. His son, Kevin, played college basketball at Mount Saint Mary's College, and his grandson, Michael, played college basketball for Saint Joseph's. Booth died on September 12, 2022, following a short illness. He was 82.
