= 1979–80 Virginia Cavaliers men's basketball team =

American college basketball season

1979–80 Virginia Cavaliers men's basketball

National Invitation Tournament, Champions
- Conference: Atlantic Coast Conference
- Record: 24–10 (7–7 ACC)
- Head coach: Terry Holland (6th season)
- Assistant coaches: Craig Littlepage (4th season); Jim Larranaga (1st season)
- Home arena: University Hall

1979–80 ACC men's basketball standings
	Conf.				Overall
Team	W		L	PCT	W		L	PCT
No. 8 Maryland	11	–	3	.786	24	–	7	.774
No. 15 North Carolina	9	–	5	.643	21	–	8	.724
NC State	9	–	5	.643	20	–	8	.714
Clemson	8	–	6	.571	23	–	9	.719
Virginia	7	–	7	.500	24	–	10	.706
No. 14 Duke †	7	–	7	.500	24	–	9	.727
Wake Forest	4	–	10	.286	13	–	14	.481
Georgia Tech	1	–	13	.071	8	–	18	.308
† 1980 ACC tournament winner Rankings from AP Poll

The 1979–80 Virginia Cavaliers men's basketball team represented University of Virginia and was a member of the Atlantic Coast Conference. It was Ralph Sampson's freshman year with the Cavaliers.

== Roster ==
1979–80 Virginia Cavaliers men's basketball team
Players
Coaches

Pos.	#	Name	Height	Weight	Year	Hometown
G	3	Jeff Lamp	6 ft 6 in (1.98 m)	193 lb (88 kg)	Jr	Louisville, Kentucky
F	10	Craig Robinson	6 ft 8 in (2.03 m)	195 lb (88 kg)	Fr	Montclair, New Jersey
G	11	Garland Jefferson (C)	6 ft 3 in (1.91 m)	205 lb (93 kg)	Sr	Covington, Virginia
F/C	12	Dean Carpenter	6 ft 9 in (2.06 m)	221 lb (100 kg)	So	New Orleans
G	21	Darren Cross	6 ft 4 in (1.93 m)	181 lb (82 kg)	Fr	Queens, New York
G	23	Jeff Klein	6 ft 5 in (1.96 m)	185 lb (84 kg)	Jr	Stow, Ohio
G	24	Jeff Jones	6 ft 3 in (1.91 m)	190 lb (86 kg)	So	Owensboro, Kentucky
F	25	Lee Raker	6 ft 5 in (1.96 m)	201 lb (91 kg)	Jr	Louisville, Kentucky
G	32	Doug Newburg	6 ft 2 in (1.88 m)	185 lb (84 kg)	Fr	McLean, Virginia
F	42	Peter MacBeth	6 ft 9 in (2.06 m)	227 lb (103 kg)	So	Marietta, Georgia
F	44	Terry Gates	6 ft 8 in (2.03 m)	219 lb (99 kg)	Jr	Louisville, Kentucky
F	45	Mike Owens (C)	6 ft 6 in (1.98 m)	218 lb (99 kg)	Sr	Kensington, Maryland
C	50	Ralph Sampson	7 ft 4 in (2.24 m)	210 lb (95 kg)	Fr	Harrisonburg, Virginia
F/C	55	Lewis Lattimore	6 ft 9 in (2.06 m)	217 lb (98 kg)	Jr	Dayton, Ohio

Head coach

- Terry Holland (Davidson)

Assistant coach(es)

- Craig Littlepage (Penn)
- Jim Larrañaga (Providence)

Legend

- (C) Team captain
- (S) Suspended
- (I) Ineligible
- (W) Walk-on
- Injured
- Current redshirt

== Schedule ==
Date time, TV	Rank^{#}	Opponent^{#}	Result	Record	Site (attendance) city, state
Regular season
Nov. 30*	No. 13	Johns Hopkins	W 93–58	1–0	University Hall (9,000); Charlottesville, Virginia
Dec. 1	No. 13	Georgia Tech	W 55–37	2–0 (1–0)	University Hall (9,000); Charlottesville, Virginia
Dec. 3*	No. 13	Randolph–Macon	W 76–55	3–0 (1–0)	University Hall (8,500); Charlottesville, Virginia
Dec. 5*	No. 13	at Temple	W 58–52	4–0 (1–0)	McGonigle Hall (8,559); Philadelphia
Dec. 15*	No. 13	at BYU–Hawaii	W 82–64	5–0 (1–0)	Cannon Activities Center (1,000); Laie, HI
Dec. 18*	No. 12	at Chaminade	W 79–54	6–0 (1–0)	Neal S. Blaisdell Center (1,092); Honolulu, HI
Dec. 21*	No. 12	vs. San Jose State	L 79–83	6–1 (1–0)	Toso Pavilion; Santa Clara, California
Dec. 22*	No. 12	vs. Army	W 84–60	7–1 (1–0)	Toso Pavilion; Santa Clara, California
Dec. 28*	No. 14	vs. VCU	W 89–72	8–1 (1–0)	Richmond Coliseum (10,716); Richmond, Virginia
Dec. 29*	No. 14	vs. Old Dominion	W 79–58	9–1 (1–0)	Richmond Coliseum (10,716); Richmond, Virginia
Jan. 2	No. 13	Wake Forest	W 64–59	10–1 (2–0)	University Hall (9,000); Charlottesville, Virginia
Jan. 5	No. 13	No. 6 North Carolina	W 88–82	11–1 (3–0)	University Hall (9,000); Charlottesville, Virginia
Jan. 7*	No. 13	Delaware	W 82–55	12–1 (3–0)	University Hall (9,000); Charlottesville, Virginia
Jan. 12	No. 8	at NC State	L 56–64	12–2 (3–1)	Reynolds Coliseum (12,200); Raleigh, North Carolina
Jan. 14*	No. 8	vs. Virginia Tech	W 65–58	13–2 (3–1)	Richmond Coliseum (10,716); Richmond, Virginia
Jan. 16*	No. 12	Pennsylvania	W 69–39	14–2 (3–1)	University Hall (9,000); Charlottesville, Virginia
Jan. 19	No. 12	at No. 17 Clemson	L 68–88	14–3 (3–2)	Littlejohn Coliseum (10,700); Clemson, South Carolina
Jan. 23	No. 17	at No. 3 Duke	W 90–84	15–3 (4–2)	Cameron Indoor Stadium (8,564); Durham, North Carolina
Jan. 26	No. 17	NC State	W 49–47	16–3 (5–2)	University Hall (9,000); Charlottesville, Virginia
Jan. 27*	No. 17	at No. 4 Ohio State	L 65–70	16–4 (5–2)	St. John Arena (13,591); Columbus, Ohio
Jan. 30	No. 13	No. 12 Maryland	L 61–63	16–5 (5–3)	University Hall (9,000); Charlottesville, Virginia
Feb. 2	No. 13	at Wake Forest	L 77–79	16–6 (5–4)	Winston-Salem Memorial Coliseum (8,100); Winston-Salem, North Carolina
Feb. 6	No. 18	No. 10 Duke	W 73–69	17–6 (6–4)	University Hall (9,000); Charlottesville, Virginia
Feb. 9	No. 18	at Georgia Tech	L 61–62	17–7 (6–5)	Alexander Memorial Coliseum (5,414); Atlanta
Feb. 13		No. 10 Clemson	W 89–87	18–7 (7–5)	University Hall (9,000); Charlottesville, Virginia
Feb. 16		at No. 11 North Carolina	L 51–68	18–8 (7–6)	Carmichael Arena (10,000); Chapel Hill, North Carolina
Feb. 20*		William & Mary	W 63–55	19–8 (7–6)	University Hall (9,000); Charlottesville, Virginia
Feb. 23		at No. 9 Maryland	L 71–82	19–9 (7–7)	Cole Field House (14,500); College Park, Maryland
ACC Tournament
Feb. 28		vs. No. 17 Clemson; ACC Quarterfinals	L 49–57	19–10	Greensboro Coliseum (15,735); Greensboro, North Carolina
National Invitation Tournament
Mar. 5*		Lafayette; NIT First Round	W 67–56	20–10	University Hall (6,804); Charlottesville, Virginia
Mar. 10*		Boston College; NIT Second Round	W 57–55	21–10	University Hall (9,000); Charlottesville, Virginia
Mar. 13*		Michigan; NIT Quarterfinals	W 79–68	22–10	University Hall (9,000); Charlottesville, Virginia
Mar. 17*		vs. UNLV; NIT Semifinals	W 90–71	23–10	Madison Square Garden (11,223); New York City
Mar. 19*		vs. Minnesota; NIT Finals	W 58–55	24–10	Madison Square Garden (13,598); New York
*Non-conference game. (#) Tournament seedings in parentheses. All times are in Eastern Time.

== Awards and honors ==
- Jeff Lamp, 3rd Team UPI All-American
- Jeff Lamp, 2nd Team All-ACC
- Ralph Sampson, NIT Most Valuable Player
- Ralph Sampson, ACC Rookie of the Year

== NBA draft ==
Year	Round	Pick	Player	NBA club
1981	1	15	Jeff Lamp	Portland Trail Blazers
1981	4	77	Lee Raker	San Diego Clippers
1981	7	159	Lewis Latimore	Milwaukee Bucks
1982	4	77	Jeff Jones	Indiana Pacers
1983	1	1	Ralph Sampson	Houston Rockets
1983	3	68	Craig Robinson	Boston Celtics
