= 1979–80 North Carolina Tar Heels men's basketball team =

American college basketball season

1979–80 North Carolina Tar Heels men's basketball

NCAA Tournament, Second Round
- Conference: Atlantic Coast Conference

Ranking
- Coaches: No. 15
- AP: No. 15
- Record: 21–8 (9–5 ACC)
- Head coach: Dean Smith (19th season)
- Assistant coaches: Bill Guthridge (13th season); Eddie Fogler (9th season); Roy Williams (2nd season)
- Captains: Dave Colescott; Mike O'Koren; John Virgil; Jeff Wolf; Rich Yonakor
- Home arena: Carmichael Auditorium

1979–80 ACC men's basketball standings
	Conf.				Overall
Team	W		L	PCT	W		L	PCT
No. 8 Maryland	11	–	3	.786	24	–	7	.774
No. 15 North Carolina	9	–	5	.643	21	–	8	.724
NC State	9	–	5	.643	20	–	8	.714
Clemson	8	–	6	.571	23	–	9	.719
Virginia	7	–	7	.500	24	–	10	.706
No. 14 Duke †	7	–	7	.500	24	–	9	.727
Wake Forest	4	–	10	.286	13	–	14	.481
Georgia Tech	1	–	13	.071	8	–	18	.308
† 1980 ACC tournament winner Rankings from AP Poll

The 1979–80 North Carolina Tar Heels men's basketball team represented the University of North Carolina at Chapel Hill during the 1979–80 college basketball season. North Carolina finished with an overall record of 21–8 (9–5 ACC). In the 1980 NCAA Tournament they received at a large bid were a #3 seed. Once again the Tar Heels lost in the second round, this time to Texas A&M 78–61 in double overtime.

== Schedule ==
Date time, TV	Rank^{#}	Opponent^{#}	Result	Record	Site city, state
November 30*	No. 6	vs. NC State; Big Four Tournament	W 97–84	1–0	Greensboro Coliseum; Greensboro, NC
December 1*	No. 6	vs. No. 3 Duke; Big Four Tournament	L 74–86	1–1	Greensboro Coliseum; Greensboro, NC
December 3*	No. 6	vs. South Florida	W 93–62	2–1	Civic Center; Springfield, MA
December 8*	No. 8	Cincinnati	W 68–63	3–1	Greensboro Coliseum; Greensboro, NC
December 15*	No. 8	Detroit Mercy	W 90–72	4–1	Carmichael Auditorium; Chapel Hill, NC
December 22*	No. 8	at No. 5 Indiana	W 61–57	5–1	Bloomington, IN
January 2	No. 6	at Clemson	L 76–93	5–2	Littlejohn Coliseum; Clemson, SC
January 5	No. 6	at No. 13 Virginia	L 82–88	5–3	Charlottesville, VA
January 7*	No. 6	at Mercer	W 81–63	6–3	Macon, GA
January 9	No. 15	Wake Forest	W 72–68	7–3	Carmichael Auditorium; Chapel Hill, NC
January 12	No. 15	at No. 1 Duke	W 82–67	8–3	Cameron Indoor Stadium; Durham, NC
January 14	No. 15	Georgia Tech	W 54–53	9–3	Greensboro Coliseum; Greensboro, NC
January 16	No. 9	No. 16 NC State	W 67–64	10–3	Carmichael Auditorium; Chapel Hill, NC
January 20	No. 9	No. 16 Maryland	L 86–92	10–4	Carmichael Auditorium; Chapel Hill, NC
January 23	No. 13	at Wake Forest	W 73–61	11–4	Winston-Salem, NC
January 26	No. 13	No. 12 Clemson	W 73–70	12–4	Carmichael Auditorium; Chapel Hill, NC
January 29*	No. 13	William & Mary	W 71–61	13–4	Carmichael Auditorium; Chapel Hill, NC
February 1*	No. 11	vs. The Citadel; North-South Doubleheader	W 51–40	14–4	Charlotte Coliseum; Charlotte, NC
February 2*	No. 11	vs. Furman; North-South Doubleheader	W 75–63	15–4	Charlotte, NC
February 4*	No. 11	Yale	W 85–74	16–4	Carmichael Auditorium; Chapel Hill, NC
February 7	No. 11	at No. 7 Maryland	L 69–70	16–5	College Park, MD
February 11	No. 11	at Georgia Tech	W 60–50	17–5	Atlanta, GA
February 14*	No. 11	vs. Rutgers	W 73–70 ^{OT}	18–5	Madison Square Garden; New York, NY
February 16		Virginia	W 68–51	19–5	Carmichael Auditorium; Chapel Hill, NC
February 20	No. 8	at NC State	L 50–63	19–6	Raleigh, NC
February 23	No. 8	No. 17 Duke	W 96–71	20–6	Carmichael Auditorium; Chapel Hill, NC
February 28*	No. 10	vs. Wake Forest; ACC Tournament	W 75–62	21–6	Greensboro Coliseum; Greensboro, NC
February 29*	No. 10	vs. Duke; ACC Tournament	L 61–75	21–7	Greensboro Coliseum; Greensboro, NC
March 9*	No. 15	vs. Texas A&M; NCAA Tournament	L 61–78 ^{2OT}	21–8	Denton, TX
*Non-conference game. ^{#}Rankings from AP Poll. (#) Tournament seedings in parentheses.
