= Albert King (basketball) =

American basketball player (born 1959)

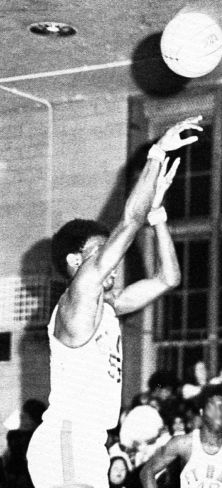
- King playing with the Fort Hamilton High School varsity team in 1974–75

Personal information
- Born: December 17, 1959 (age 66) Brooklyn, New York, U.S.
- Listed height: 6 ft 6 in (1.98 m)
- Listed weight: 190 lb (86 kg)

Career information
- High school: Fort Hamilton (Brooklyn, New York)
- College: Maryland (1977–1981)
- NBA draft: 1981: 1st round, 10th overall pick
- Drafted by: New Jersey Nets
- Playing career: 1981–1991
- Position: Small forward / shooting guard
- Number: 55, 17, 15

Career history
- 1981–1987: New Jersey Nets
- 1987–1988: Philadelphia 76ers
- 1988–1989: San Antonio Spurs
- 1989: Olimpia Milano
- 1990: Hapoel Holon
- 1990–1991: Albany Patroons
- 1991: Washington Bullets

Career highlights
- LBA champion (1989); CBA Newcomer of the Year (1991); Consensus second-team All-American (1980); Second-team All-American – UPI (1981); Third-team All-American – NABC (1981); ACC Player of the Year (1980); First-team All-ACC (1980); Second-team All-ACC (1981); ACC tournament MVP (1980); Mr. Basketball USA (1977); 2× First-team Parade All-American (1976, 1977); McDonald's All-American (1977); Fourth-team Parade All-American (1975)

Career NBA statistics
- Points: 6,470 (12.1 ppg)
- Rebounds: 2,262 (4.2 rpg)
- Assists: 1,171 (2.2 apg)
- Stats at NBA.com
- Stats at Basketball Reference

Albert King (born December 17, 1959) is an American former professional basketball player. The younger brother of former NBA scoring champion and Hall of Famer Bernard King, Albert played at Fort Hamilton High School in Brooklyn and is regarded as one of the nation's greatest high school players of all time. He was rated the top prep player in the nation over Magic Johnson and Gene Banks during his senior year. A 6 ft 6 in (1.98 m) guard-forward from the University of Maryland, King was selected by the New Jersey Nets in the first round (10th overall) of the 1981 NBA draft. King played in nine NBA seasons for four teams.

== Early life ==
King attended Fort Hamilton High School in Brooklyn, New York. He was named to the inaugural McDonald's All-American team, which played in the 1977 Capital Classic.

== College career ==
In the 1979–80 college season, King was named the ACC Men's Basketball Player of the Year. He appeared on the cover of Sports Illustrated twice during the 1980 season. One of the highlights of his ACC career was a thundering dunk over Duke center Mike Gminski during a Maryland home game at Cole Field House. Duke was the first-seeded team in the nation at the time, and King went on to lead the Terrapins in scoring that night and helped defeat the Blue Devils 101–82. His no. 55 jersey was honored by the Maryland basketball program. In 2002, King was named to the ACC 50th Anniversary men's basketball team as one of the fifty greatest players in Atlantic Coast Conference history.

== Professional career ==
King played in nine NBA seasons for four teams. He played for the New Jersey Nets, Philadelphia 76ers, San Antonio Spurs and Washington Bullets. King's best years as a professional came during his playing days with the Nets from 1981 to 1987. During the 1982–83 season, he appeared in 79 games and averaged 17.0 points per game and 3.7 assists per game. In his NBA career, he played in 534 games and scored a total of 6,470 points.

At the end of the 1988–89 season, he was signed by Olimpia Milano of the Italian Basketball League to replace Billy Martin. In Milan he played the last two games of the regular season and the following 12 of the postseason. Alongside experienced players such as Bob McAdoo, Mike D'Antoni and Dino Meneghin, he gave an essential contribution for winning the title in a very contested last game of the finals, scoring a season-high 22 points.

During the second half of the 1989–90 season, King played for Hapoel Holon of the Israeli Basketball League. In just 11 games he scored an average of 22.8 points per game including a 23-point game against Israeli powerhouse Maccabi Tel Aviv. The team finished the season in the seventh place and King left.

King spent the 1990–1991 season playing in the Continental Basketball Association with the Albany Patroons, coached by George Karl, where he was named the CBA Newcomer of the Year.

He returned to the NBA again in September 1991, when he signed with the Washington Bullets. He was waived by the Bullets in November after appearing in six games where he averaged 5.2 points per game.

== Personal life ==
He is the younger brother of former NBA scoring champion, Bernard King. They grew up in the Fort Greene neighborhood of Brooklyn. Two of his older brothers also played college basketball, Thomas for West Virginia Wesleyan and Ronald for Miami Dade Junior College.

He is also one of the central personalities in Rick Telander's acclaimed book Heaven is a Playground.

In the 1990s, he hosted Nets Slammin' Planet with Evan Roberts, Brandon Scoop B Robinson and Chris Carrino.

Following his basketball career, King opened several Wendy's restaurants.

== Career statistics ==
Legend
GP	Games played	GS	Games started	MPG	Minutes per game
FG%	Field goal percentage	3P%	3-point field goal percentage	FT%	Free throw percentage
RPG	Rebounds per game	APG	Assists per game	SPG	Steals per game
BPG	Blocks per game	PPG	Points per game	**Bold**	Career high

=== NBA ===
==== Regular season ====
Year	Team	GP	GS	MPG	FG%	3P%	FT%	RPG	APG	SPG	BPG	PPG
1981–82	New Jersey	76	52	22.3	.482	.231	.778	4.1	1.9	.8	**.5**	12.1
1982–83	New Jersey	**79**	**75**	**31.0**	.475	.261	.775	**5.8**	**3.7**	**1.2**	**.5**	**17.0**
1983–84	New Jersey	**79**	53	26.6	**.492**	.136	.786	4.9	2.6	**1.2**	.4	14.7
1984–85	New Jersey	42	7	20.5	.491	.000	.817	3.8	1.4	1.0	.2	12.8
1985–86	New Jersey	73	69	27.4	.456	.174	.823	5.0	2.5	.8	.3	14.3
1986–87	New Jersey	61	15	21.2	.426	**.406**	.810	3.5	1.7	.6	**.5**	9.5
1987–88	Philadelphia	72	44	22.1	.391	.347	.757	3.0	1.5	.5	.3	7.2
1988–89	San Antonio	46	11	17.2	.431	.250	.771	3.0	1.7	.6	.2	7.1
1991–92	Washington	6	0	9.8	.367	.286	**.875**	1.8	.8	.5	.0	5.2
Career		534	326	24.0	.461	.268	.791	4.2	2.2	.8	.4	12.1

==== Playoffs ====
Year	Team	GP	GS	MPG	FG%	3P%	FT%	RPG	APG	SPG	BPG	PPG
1982	New Jersey	2		29.0	**.545**	–	.800	4.0	3.0	**2.5**	.5	20.0
1983	New Jersey	2		34.0	.474	.500	.833	4.0	1.5	1.0	.0	21.0
1984	New Jersey	**11**		26.8	.414	.000	.696	5.3	2.3	.9	.4	12.5
1985	New Jersey	3	**3**	**35.0**	.491	**1.000**	.692	**7.7**	1.7	2.3	**.7**	**22.0**
1986	New Jersey	3	**3**	32.7	.429	.250	**1.000**	4.3	**3.3**	.7	.3	13.7
Career		21	6	29.7	.453	.333	.730	5.2	2.3	1.2	.4	15.6
