= 2008–09 Alabama State Hornets basketball team =

American college basketball season

2008–09 Alabama State Hornets basketball
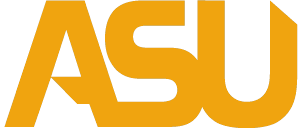

SWAC Regular Season and Tournament champion

NCAA tournament, Opening Round
- Conference: Southwestern Athletic Conference
- Record: 22–10 (16–2 SWAC)
- Head coach: Lewis Jackson (4th season)
- Assistant coaches: Steve Rogers; Anthony Sewell; Courtney Stephens
- Home arena: Dunn–Oliver Acadome

2008–09 SWAC men's basketball standings
	Conf.				Overall
Team	W		L	PCT	W		L	PCT
Alabama State †	16	–	2	.889	22	–	10	.688
Jackson State	15	–	3	.833	18	–	15	.545
Prairie View A&M	12	–	6	.667	17	–	16	.515
Arkansas–Pine Bluff	11	–	7	.611	13	–	18	.419
Southern	8	–	10	.444	8	–	23	.258
Mississippi Valley State	7	–	11	.389	7	–	25	.219
Texas Southern	7	–	11	.389	7	–	25	.219
Alabama A&M	6	–	12	.333	8	–	19	.296
Grambling State	4	–	14	.222	6	–	23	.207
Alcorn State	4	–	14	.222	6	–	25	.194
† 2009 SWAC tournament winner As of March 12, 2009; Rankings from AP Poll

The 2008–09 Alabama State Hornets basketball team represented Alabama State University in the 2008–09 NCAA Division I men's basketball season. The Hornets, led by head coach Lewis Jackson, played their home games at Dunn–Oliver Acadome in Montgomery, Alabama, as members of the Southwestern Athletic Conference. The Hornets won the SWAC regular season title, then won the 2009 SWAC tournament to earn an automatic bid to the NCAA tournament as a 16th seed in the Midwest region. Alabama State played in the Opening Round game, losing to Morehead State, 58–43.

== Roster ==
2008–09 Alabama State Hornets men's basketball team
Players
Coaches

Pos.	#	Name	Height	Weight	Year	Hometown
G/F	1	Rashad Provit	6 ft 7 in (2.01 m)	—	Sr	Montgomery, Alabama
G	2	Andrew Hayles	6 ft 5 in (1.96 m)	—	Sr	Mobile, Alabama
F	3	Wesley Jones	6 ft 7 in (2.01 m)	—	Jr	Beatrice, Alabama
G	4	Jeff Middlebrooks	6 ft 0 in (1.83 m)	—	Fr	Atlanta, Georgia
G	5	Jerry Stangline	6 ft 2 in (1.88 m)	—	RS Fr	Montgomery, Alabama
G	11	Brandon Brooks	6 ft 2 in (1.88 m)	—	Sr	Dallas, Texas
G	12	Ivory White	6 ft 4 in (1.93 m)	—	RS Fr	Greensboro, Alabama
G	21	Tramaine Butler	6 ft 3 in (1.91 m)	—	So	Detroit, Michigan
G	23	Menji Mundadi	6 ft 3 in (1.91 m)	—	Jr	Chicago, Illinois
G	24	Jevon Freeman	5 ft 11 in (1.8 m)	—	So	Covington, Georgia
SF	25	Alexander Tolbert	6 ft 7 in (2.01 m)	—	RS Fr	Mobile, Alabama
PF	34	Roland Fitch	6 ft 7 in (2.01 m)	—	So	Livingston, Alabama
C	42	Chief Kickingstallionsims	7 ft 1 in (2.16 m)	—	Sr	Boynton Beach, Florida
F	45	Byron Walker	6 ft 8 in (2.03 m)	—	Jr	Douglasville, Georgia

Head coach

- Lewis Jackson (Alabama State)

Assistant coach(es)

- Steve Rogers (Alabama State)
- Anthony Sewell (Troy)
- Courtney Stephens (Alabama State)

Legend

- (C) Team captain
- (S) Suspended
- (I) Ineligible
- (W) Walk-on
- Injured
- Current redshirt

Roster
Last update: October 16, 2022

== Schedule and results ==
Date time, TV	Rank^{#}	Opponent^{#}	Result	Record	Site city, state
Regular season
November 18, 2008*		at Southern Miss	L 61–74	0–1	Reed Green Coliseum; Hattiesburg, MS
November 21, 2008*		vs. Illinois State; SMU Tip-Off Classic	L 71–77	0–2	Moody Coliseum; Dallas, TX
November 22, 2008*		at SMU; SMU Tip-Off Classic	L 51–56	0–3	Moody Coliseum; Dallas, TX
November 23, 2008*		vs. Houston Baptist; SMU Tip-Off Classic	W 77–68	1–3	Moody Coliseum; Dallas, TX
December 3, 2008*		at Nebraska	L 51–80	1–4	Bob Devaney Sports Center; Lincoln, NE
December 6, 2008*		at Mississippi State	L 67–76	1–5	Humphrey Coliseum; Starkville, MS
December 15, 2008*		at Ole Miss	L 81–85	1–6	Tad Smith Coliseum; Oxford, MS
December 19, 2008*		Auburn Montgomery	W 73–64	2–6	Dunn–Oliver Acadome; Montgomery, AL
December 22, 2008*		Auburn	L 72–77	2–7	Beard–Eaves–Memorial Coliseum; Auburn, AL
December 29, 2008*		West Alabama	W 71–59	3–7	Dunn–Oliver Acadome; Montgomery, AL
January 3, 2009		Jackson State	W 66–60	4–7 (1–0)	Dunn–Oliver Acadome; Montgomery, AL
January 5, 2009		Grambling State	W 60–46	5–7 (2–0)	Dunn–Oliver Acadome; Montgomery, AL
January 10, 2009		at Arkansas–Pine Bluff	W 71–66	6–7 (3–0)	H.O. Clemmons Arena; Pine Bluff, AR
January 12, 2009; 7:30 p.m.		at Mississippi Valley State	W 65–64	7–7 (4–0)	Harrison HPER Complex; Itta Bena, MS
January 17, 2009		at Alabama A&M	W 69–57	8–7 (5–0)	Elmore Gymnasium; Huntsville, AL
January 24, 2009		Southern	W 64–60	9–7 (6–0)	Dunn–Oliver Acadome; Montgomery, AL
January 26, 2009		Alcorn State	L 74–79	9–8 (6–1)	Dunn–Oliver Acadome; Montgomery, AL
January 31, 2009		at Prairie View A&M	W 63–53	10–8 (7–1)	William J. Nicks Building; Prairie View, TX
February 2, 2009		at Texas Southern	W 72–56	11–8 (8–1)	Health and Physical Education Arena; Houston, TX
February 7, 2009		Arkansas–Pine Bluff	W 65–59	12–8 (9–1)	Dunn–Oliver Acadome; Montgomery, AL
February 9, 2009; 8:00 p.m.		Mississippi Valley State	W 80–67	13–8 (10–1)	Dunn–Oliver Acadome; Montgomery, AL
February 14, 2009		Alabama A&M	W 87–43	14–8 (11–1)	Dunn–Oliver Acadome; Montgomery, AL
February 21, 2009		at Southern	W 89–52	15–8 (12–1)	F. G. Clark Center; Baton Rouge, LA
February 23, 2009		at Alcorn State	W 76–71	16–8 (13–1)	Davey Whitney Complex; Lorman, MS
February 28, 2009		Prairie View A&M	W 64–49	17–8 (14–1)	Dunn–Oliver Acadome; Montgomery, AL
March 2, 2009		Texas Southern	W 90–73	18–8 (15–1)	Dunn–Oliver Acadome; Montgomery, AL
March 5, 2009		at Jackson State	L 64–67	18–9 (15–2)	Williams Assembly Center; Jackson, MS
March 7, 2009		at Grambling State	W 65–58	19–9 (16–2)	Fredrick C. Hobdy Assembly Center; Grambling, LA
SWAC tournament
March 11, 2009	(1)	vs. (8) Alabama A&M; SWAC Quarterfinals	W 70–58	20–9	Fair Park Arena; Birmingham, AL
March 13, 2009	(1)	vs. (4) Arkansas–Pine Bluff; SWAC Semifinals	W 63–55	21–9	Fair Park Arena; Birmingham, AL
March 14, 2009	(1)	vs. (2) Jackson State; SWAC Championship	W 65–58	22–9	Fair Park Arena; Birmingham, AL
NCAA tournament
March 17, 2009	(16 MW)	vs. (16 MW) Morehead State; NCAA Opening Round	L 43–58	22–10	University of Dayton Arena; Dayton, OH
*Non-conference game. ^{#}Rankings from AP Poll. (#) Tournament seedings in parentheses.
