= 2008–09 Mississippi Valley State Delta Devils basketball team =

American college basketball season

2008–09 Mississippi Valley State Delta Devils men's basketball
- Conference: Southwestern Athletic Conference
- Record: 7-25 (7-11 SWAC)
- Head coach: Sean Woods (1st season)
- Assistant coach: Dylan Howard (1st season)
- Home arena: Harrison HPER Complex

2008–09 SWAC men's basketball standings
	Conf.				Overall
Team	W		L	PCT	W		L	PCT
Alabama State †	16	–	2	.889	22	–	10	.688
Jackson State	15	–	3	.833	18	–	15	.545
Prairie View A&M	12	–	6	.667	17	–	16	.515
Arkansas–Pine Bluff	11	–	7	.611	13	–	18	.419
Southern	8	–	10	.444	8	–	23	.258
Mississippi Valley State	7	–	11	.389	7	–	25	.219
Texas Southern	7	–	11	.389	7	–	25	.219
Alabama A&M	6	–	12	.333	8	–	19	.296
Grambling State	4	–	14	.222	6	–	23	.207
Alcorn State	4	–	14	.222	6	–	25	.194
† 2009 SWAC tournament winner As of March 12, 2009; Rankings from AP Poll

The 2008–09 Mississippi Valley State Delta Devils basketball team represented Mississippi Valley State University during the 2008–09 NCAA Division I men's basketball season. The Delta Devils played their home games at Harrison HPER Complex as members of the Southwestern Athletic Conference. The Delta Devils finished the season 7–25 overall and 7–11 in SWAC conference play under first year head coach Sean Woods. They lost 65–60 in the first round of the SWAC Basketball tournament to Prairie View A&M.

== Roster ==
Number	Name	Position	Height	Weight	Year	Hometown
1	Cameron Nettles	Guard	6–5	185	Freshman	Cerritos, California
1	Dwayne Harmason	Guard	5-11	180	Senior	Plaquemine, Louisiana
3	Tashan Newsome	Guard	6–4	200	Freshman	Albany, New York
5	Donald Pritchard	Guard	6–1	185	Freshman	Chicago, Illinois
10	Julius Cheeks	Guard	6–2	190	Junior	Missouri City, Texas
12	Amos Studivant	Forward	6-8	230	Freshman	Bessemer, Alabama
15	Shannon Behling	Guard	6–7	200	Junior	Columbia, South Carolina
21	Lakendrick Allen	Forward	6-6	205	Junior	Cleveland, Mississippi
22	Orlando Smith	Forward	6–5	210	Sophomore	Columbus, Mississippi
22	Aaron McReynolds	Guard	6–0	175	Freshman	Flint, Michigan
23	Michael Clark	Guard	6–3	180	Senior	Tchula, Mississippi
25	Kevin Burwell	Guard	5-10	185	Freshman	Philadelphia, Pennsylvania
32	Drummond Jones	Forward	6-5	205	Sophomore	Indianola, Mississippi
34	Eric Petty	Forward	6–6	220	Senior	Salinas, California
35	Steven Kite	Guard	6-3	195	Sophomore	Atlanta, Georgia
44	Emmenle Preston	Forward	6–9	240	Junior	National City, California

== Schedule and results ==
Date time, TV	Rank^{#}	Opponent^{#}	Result	Record	High points	High rebounds	High assists	Site (attendance) city, state
Non-conference regular season
November 14, 2008*; 9:00 pm		at No. 15 Arizona State	L 64-80	0–1	18 – Behling	10 – Petty	5 – Harmason	Desert Financial Arena (8,590); Tempe, AZ
November 15, 2008*; 9:30 pm		at Washington State	L 25-76	0–2	9 – Newsome	7 – Petty	1 – Petty	Beasley Coliseum (8,346); Pullman, WA
November 17, 2008*; 8:00 pm, ESPNU		at No. 12 Oklahoma; Dick's Sporting Goods NIT Season Tip-Off	L 53-94	0-3	16 – Behling	9 – Petty	2 – 2 Tied	Lloyd Noble Center (9,625); Norman, OK
November 18, 2008*; 5:30 pm		vs. James Madison; Dick's Sporting Goods NIT Season Tip-Off	L 54-62	0-4	22 – Behling	10 – Behling	4 – Harmason	Lloyd Noble Center; Norman, OK
November 20, 2008*; 8:00 pm		at Montana	L 65-82	0-5	18 – 2 Tied	13 – Petty	3 – Petty	Dahlberg Arena (3,214); Missoula, MT
November 24, 2008*; 4:45 pm		vs. Arizona; Dick's Sporting Goods NIT Season Tip-Off Consolation	L 52-86	0-6	11 – Clark	5 – Behling	4 – Harmason	Stegeman Coliseum; Athens, GA
November 25, 2008*; 7:00 pm		at Georgia; Dick's Sporting Goods NIT Season Tip-Off Consolation	L 57-98	0-7	13 – Behling	7 – Petty	4 – Newsome	Stegeman Coliseum; Athens, GA
November 29, 2008*; 12:30 pm, Mediacom		at Iowa State	L 59-77	0-8	21 – Behling	6 – Behling	6 – Harmason	Hilton Coliseum; Ames, IA
December 2, 2008*; 7:05 pm		at Creighton	L 58-82	0-9	22 – Newsome	12 – Harmason	4 – Newsome	CHI Health Center Omaha; Omaha, NE
December 7, 2008*; 3:00 pm, FSN South		at Kentucky	L 65-88	0-10	20 – Behling	7 – Behling	5 – Harmason	Rupp Arena (21,476); Lexington, KY
December 13, 2008*; 7:00 pm		at Houston	L 58-92	0-11	23 – Cheeks	6 – 2 Tied	3 – 2 Tied	Fertitta Center; Houston, TX
December 15, 2008*; 7:05 pm		at Arkansas State	L 58-75	0-12	15 – Newsome	6 – Harmason	7 – Harmason	First National Bank Arena; Jonesboro, AR
December 20, 2008*; 7:00 pm		Chattanooga	L 61-65	0-13	17 – Clark	5 – Behling	8 – Harmason	Harrison HPER Complex (245); Itta Bena, MS
SWAC regular season
January 3, 2009; 7:00 pm		at Arkansas-Pine Bluff	L 52-74	0-14 (0-1)	21 – Petty	14 – Petty	3 – Harmason	H.O. Clemmons Arena; Pine Bluff, AR
January 10, 2009; 7:30 pm		Alabama A&M	W 68-62	1-14 (1-1)	17 – Cheeks	13 – Petty	3 – Burwell	Harrison HPER Complex; Itta Bena, MS
January 12, 2009; 7:30 pm		Alabama State	L 64-65	1-15 (1-2)	19 – Cheeks	6 – 2 Tied	6 – Harmason	Harrison HPER Complex; Itta Bena, MS
January 17, 2009; 7:30 pm		at Alcorn State	L 72-88	1-16 (1-3)	14 – Behling	9 – Petty	4 – Harmason	Davey Whitney Complex; Lorman, MS
January 19, 2009; 8:00 pm		at Southern	L 54-57	1-17 (1-4)	16 – Harmason	12 – Behling	4 – Harmason	F.G. Clark Center; Baton Rouge, LA
January 24, 2009; 7:30 pm		Prairie View A&M	W 67-49	2-17 (2-4)	21 – Petty	10 – Petty	6 – Newsome	Harrison HPER Complex; Itta Bena, MS
January 26, 2009; 7:30 pm		Texas Southern	W 81-68	3-17 (3-4)	19 – Harmason	10 – Petty	6 – Harmason	Harrison HPER Complex; Itta Bena, MS
January 31, 2009; 1:00 pm		at Jackson State	L 58-64	3-18 (3-5)	18 – Petty	8 – Behling	3 – Harmason	Williams Assembly Center; Jackson, MS
February 2, 2009; 7:30 pm		at Grambling State	L 68-75	3-19 (3-6)	22 – Behling	9 – Petty	4 – 2 Tied	Fredrick C. Hobdy Assembly Center; Grambling, LA
February 7, 2009; 6:00 pm		at Alabama A&M	L 65-78	3-20 (3-7)	19 – Petty	13 – Petty	5 – Harmason	T.M. Elmore Gymnasium; Normal, AL
February 9, 2009; 8:00 pm		at Alabama State	L 67-80	3-21 (3-8)	14 – 2 Tied	11 – Petty	5 – Harmason	Dunn-Oliver Acadome; Montgomery, AL
February 14, 2009; 7:30 pm		Alcorn State	W 89-71	4-21 (4-8)	18 – Petty	10 – Petty	7 – Harmason	Harrison HPER Complex; Itta Bena, MS
February 16, 2009; 7:30 pm		Southern	W 81-73	5-21 (5-8)	22 – Petty	14 – Petty	10 – Harmason	Harrison HPER Complex; Itta Bena, MS
February 21, 2009; 7:30 pm		at Prairie View A&M	L 69-81	5-22 (5-9)	–	–	–	William Nicks Building; Prairie View, TX
February 23, 2009; 7:30 pm		at Texas Southern	L 87-99	5-23 (5-10)	21 – 2 Tied	9 – Petty	9 – Harmason	H&PE Arena; Houston, TX
February 28, 2009; 7:30 pm		Jackson State	W 73-67	6-23 (6-10)	18 – Petty	8 – Petty	5 – Harmason	Harrison HPER Complex; Itta Bena, MS
March 2, 2009; 7:30 pm		Grambling State	W 62-42	7-23 (7-10)	14 – Jones	8 – 2 Tied	3 – Harmason	Harrison HPER Complex; Itta Bena, MS
March 5, 2009; 7:30 pm		Arkansas-Pine Bluff	L 63-73	7-24 (7-11)	14 – Petty	15 – Behling	4 – Harmason	Harrison HPER Complex; Itta Bena, MS
SWAC men's basketball tournament
March 12, 2009; 2:30 pm	(6)	vs. (3) Arkansas-Pine Bluff; Quarterfinals	L 60-65	7-25	18 – Petty	9 – 2 Tied	4 – Harmason	Bill Harris Arena; Birmingham, AL
*Non-conference game. ^{#}Rankings from AP Poll. (#) Tournament seedings in parentheses. All times are in Central Time.
