= 2010–11 Mississippi Valley State Delta Devils basketball team =

American college basketball season

2010–11 Mississippi Valley State Delta Devils men's basketball
- Conference: Southwestern Athletic Conference
- Record: 13–19 (12–6 SWAC)
- Head coach: Sean Woods (3rd season)
- Assistant coach: Dylan Howard (3rd season)
- Home arena: Harrison HPER Complex

2010–11 SWAC men's basketball standings
	Conf.				Overall
Team	W		L	PCT	W		L	PCT
Texas Southern	16	–	2	.889	19	–	13	.594
Jackson State	12	–	6	.667	17	–	15	.531
Mississippi Valley State	12	–	6	.667	13	–	19	.406
Alabama State †	11	–	7	.611	17	–	18	.486
Alabama A&M	10	–	8	.556	13	–	15	.464
Grambling State	8	–	10	.444	12	–	21	.364
Prairie View A&M	7	–	11	.389	10	–	22	.313
Arkansas–Pine Bluff	7	–	11	.389	7	–	24	.226
Alcorn State	4	–	14	.222	4	–	24	.143
Southern	3	–	15	.167	4	–	26	.133
† 2011 SWAC tournament winner As of March 13, 2012; Rankings from AP Poll

The 2010–11 Mississippi Valley State Delta Devils basketball team represented Mississippi Valley State University during the 2010–11 NCAA Division I men's basketball season. The Delta Devils, led by third-year head coach Sean Woods, played their home games at Harrison HPER Complex as members of the Southwestern Athletic Conference. The Delta Devils finished the season 13–19 overall and 12–6 in SWAC conference play. They lost 62–65 in the first round of the SWAC Basketball tournament to Grambling State.

== Roster ==
Number	Name	Position	Height	Weight	Year	Hometown
1	William Pugh	Guard	6–3	195	Sophomore	Greenwood, Mississippi
1	Darian Donald	Forward	6–5	185	Senior	Columbus, Mississippi
3	Terrence Joyner	Guard	6–3	180	Junior	Mendenhall, Mississippi
5	Jerome Harris	Guard	6–3	185	Junior	Chicago, Illinois
11	D'Angelo Jackson	Guard	6–1	170	Senior	Milwaukee, Wisconsin
12	Amos Studivant	Forward/Center	6–8	230	Junior	Bessemer, Alabama
21	Cor-J Cox	Guard	6–5	190	Junior	Washington, North Carolina
22	Orlando Smith	Forward	6–5	210	Senior	Columbus, Mississippi
23	Falando Jones	Forward	6–4	212	Junior	Greenwood, Mississippi
25	Kevin Burwell	Guard	5–10	185	Junior	Philadelphia, Pennsylvania
30	Mark Holmes	Forward	6–6	215	Sophomore	River Grove, Illinois
32	Paul Crosby	Center	6–8	245	Junior	Lansing, Michigan
33	Ricky Lamb	Forward	6–6	190	Sophomore	Jacksonville, Florida
42	Jason Holmes	Forward	6–9	225	Junior	River Grove, Illinois

== Schedule and results ==
Date time, TV	Rank^{#}	Opponent^{#}	Result	Record	High points	High rebounds	High assists	Site (attendance) city, state
Non-conference regular season
November 12, 2010*; 7:30 pm, CSS		at Georgia	L 70-72	0–1	16 – Jackson	8 – Smith	2 – Jackson	Stegeman Coliseum (6,728); Athens, GA
November 14, 2010*; 7:00 pm		at Indiana	L 54-71	0–2	15 – Joyner	10 – Smith	5 – Jackson	Simon Skjodt Assembly Hall (15,540); Bloomington, IN
November 21, 2010*; 7:00 pm		at Saint Mary's; South Padre Island Invitational	L 52-87	0–3	19 – J. Holmes	11 – J. Holmes	2 – 2 Tied	University Credit Union Pavilion (2,736); Moraga, CA
November 23, 2010*; 9:00 pm		at No. 23 BYU; South Padre Island Invitational	L 36-86	0–4	15 – J. Holmes	6 – 2 Tied	1 – 5 Tied	Marriott Center (9,207); Provo, UT
November 26, 2010*; 3:30 pm		vs. Liberty; South Padre Island Invitational	L 58-64	0-5	14 – Joyner	6 – 2 Tied	2 – Smith	SPI Convention Center; South Padre Island, TX
November 27, 2010*; 12:30 pm		vs. Georgia Southern; South Padre Island Invitational	W 75-64	1–5	19 – 3 Tied	14 – Smith	3 – Burwell	SPI Convention Center; South Padre Island, TX
December 11, 2010*; 7:00 pm, WNDY		at Butler	L 71-91	1–6	13 – 2 Tied	5 – 2 Tied	8 – Burwell	Hinkle Fieldhouse (5,677); Indianapolis, IN
December 13, 2010*; 8:00 pm		at Ole Miss	L 69-101	1–7	20 – Jackson	10 – J. Holmes	3 – Burwell	C.M. "Tad" Smith Coliseum (4,566); Oxford, MS
December 15, 2010*; 8:00 pm		at Arkansas	L 64-87	1–8	10 – 3 Tied	9 – J. Holmes	4 – 2 Tied	Bud Walton Arena (10,758); Fayetteville, AR
December 18, 2010*; 8:00 pm		at No. 17 Kentucky	L 60-85	1–9	17 – Jackson	10 – Crosby	6 – Crosby	Rupp Arena (23,341); Lexington, KY
December 21, 2010*; 8:00 pm		at Marquette	L 77-102	1–10	17 – 2 Tied	9 – J. Holmes	4 – Joyner	BMO Harris Bradley Center (13,930); Milwaukee, WI
December 29, 2010*; 8:00 pm		at Southern Mississippi	L 46-91	1–11	12 – Crosby	7 – J. Holmes	2 – Burwell	Reed Green Coliseum (2,733); Hattiesburg, MS
December 30, 2010*; 5:30 pm		vs. Southeastern Louisiana	L 60-76	1–12	13 – 3 Tied	9 – Cox	4 – Burwell	Reed Green Coliseum; Hattiesburg, MS
SWAC regular season
January 4, 2011; 8:30 pm		at Arkansas-Pine Bluff	W 83-69	2-12 (1-0)	22 – Jackson	9 – 2 Tied	5 – Jackson	H.O. Clemmons Arena (1,782); Pine Bluff, AR
January 8, 2011; 5:30 pm		Alabama A&M	L 60-72	2-13 (1-1)	15 – Jones	14 – J. Holmes	4 – Jackson	Harrison HPER Complex (993); Itta Bena, MS
January 10, 2011; 9:00 pm		Alabama State	W 74-70	3-13 (2-1)	28 – Jackson	6 – 2 Tied	7 – Jackson	Harrison HPER Complex (1,086); Itta Bena, MS
January 15, 2011; 5:30 pm		at Alcorn State	W 87-70	4-13 (3-1)	20 – Jackson	9 – Crosby	6 – Burwell	Davey Whitney Complex; Lorman, MS
January 17, 2011; 9:00 pm		at Southern	W 65-62	5-13 (4-1)	21 – Crosby	13 – Crosby	4 – Joyner	F. G. Clark Center (869); Baton Rouge, LA
January 22, 2011; 5:30 pm		Prairie View A&M	W 96-63	6-13 (5-1)	14 – Joyner	9 – J. Holmes	5 – 2 Tied	Harrison HPER Complex (2,593); Itta Bena, MS
January 24, 2011; 7:00 pm		Texas Southern	W 89-76	7-13 (6-1)	21 – Joyner	8 – Crosby	9 – Joyner	Harrison HPER Complex (3,709); Itta Bena, MS
January 29, 2011; 6:30 pm		at Jackson State	L 73-83	7-14 (6-2)	22 – Jackson	9 – Smith	3 – 2 Tied	Williams Assembly Center (6,809); Jackson, MS
January 31, 2011; 9:00 pm		at Grambling State	W 94-74	8-14 (7-2)	28 – Jackson	7 – 2 Tied	4 – 2 Tied	Fredrick C. Hobdy Assembly Center (1,134); Grambling, LA
February 5, 2011; 7:30 pm		at Alabama A&M	W 63-60	9-14 (8-2)	16 – Crosby	9 – J. Holmes	4 – Burwell	T.M. Elmore Gymnasium (1,678); Normal, AL
February 7, 2011; 7:00 pm		at Alabama State	L 63-90	9-15 (8-3)	15 – Smith	8 – Crosby	4 – Burwell	Dunn-Oliver Acadome (2,117); Montgomery, AL
February 12, 2011; 5:30 pm		Alcorn State	W 91-83	10-15 (9-3)	25 – Jones	16 – Smith	4 – Jones	Harrison HPER Complex (3,203); Itta Bena, MS
February 14, 2011; 9:00 pm		Southern	W 68-48	11-15 (10-3)	15 – Jones	13 – Smith	3 – 3 Tied	Harrison HPER Complex (2,989); Itta Bena, MS
February 19, 2011; 9:00 pm		at Prairie View A&M	L 54-59	11-16 (10-4)	15 – Smith	11 – Smith	3 – Jackson	Williams Nicks Building (2,211); Prairie View, TX
February 21, 2011; 9:00 pm		at Texas Southern	L 55-58	11-17 (10-5)	21 – Jackson	11 – Crosby	4 – Jackson	H&PE Arena (1,322); Houston, TX
February 26, 2011; 5:30 pm		Jackson State	L 63-82	11-18 (10-6)	22 – Joyner	9 – Crosby	3 – Jackson	Harrison HPER Complex (4,692); Itta Bena, MS
February 28, 2011; 9:00 pm		Grambling State	W 66-63	12-18 (11-6)	14 – Crosby	12 – Smith	3 – 2 Tied	Harrison HPER Complex (2,499); Itta Bena, MS
March 3, 2011; 8:30 pm		Arkansas-Pine Bluff	W 88-69	13-18 (12-6)	14 – 2 Tied	8 – Crosby	5 – 2 Tied	Harrison HPER Complex (2,899); Itta Bena, MS
SWAC men's basketball tournament
March 10, 2011; 1:30 pm	(3)	vs. (6) Grambling State; Quarterfinals	W 63–60	13-19	16 – Crosby	7 – Crosby	2 – J. Holmes	Garland Special Events Center; Garland, TX
*Non-conference game. ^{#}Rankings from AP Poll. (#) Tournament seedings in parentheses. All times are in Central Time.
