= 2011–12 Mississippi Valley State Delta Devils basketball team =

American college basketball season

2011–12 Mississippi Valley State Delta Devils men's basketball

SWAC Regular Season & tournament champions

NCAA Tournament South Region 16 Seed, First Four
- Conference: Southwestern Athletic Conference
- Record: 21–13 (17–1 SWAC)
- Head coach: Sean Woods (4th season)
- Assistant coaches: Brian Ellis; Chico Potts
- Home arena: Harrison HPER Complex

2011–12 SWAC men's basketball standings
	Conf.				Overall
Team	W		L	PCT	W		L	PCT
Mississippi Valley State †	17	–	1	.944	21	–	13	.618
*Southern	13	–	5	.722	17	–	14	.548
Texas Southern	12	–	6	.667	15	–	18	.455
Prairie View A&M	10	–	8	.556	14	–	18	.438
Arkansas–Pine Bluff	9	–	9	.500	11	–	22	.333
Alabama State	9	–	9	.500	12	–	19	.387
Alcorn State	6	–	12	.333	10	–	22	.313
Alabama A&M	5	–	13	.278	7	–	21	.250
Jackson State	5	–	13	.278	7	–	24	.226
*Grambling State	4	–	14	.222	4	–	24	.143
† 2012 SWAC tournament winner As of March 13, 2012; Rankings from AP Poll; *Ineligible for conference tournament due to low APR

The 2011–12 Mississippi Valley State Delta Devils basketball team represented Mississippi Valley State University during the 2011–12 NCAA Division I men's basketball season. The Delta Devils, led by fourth year head coach Sean Woods, played their home games at Harrison HPER Complex and are members of the Southwestern Athletic Conference. The Delta Devils finished the season 21–13, 17–1 in SWAC play to be crowned SWAC regular season champions. They also won the SWAC Basketball tournament, defeating Texas Southern in the championship game, to earn the conference's automatic bid into the 2012 NCAA tournament. It was the Delta Devils fifth NCAA Tournament appearance and first since 2008. They lost in the First Four round to WKU.

== Roster ==
Number	Name	Position	Height	Weight	Year	Hometown
1	William Pugh	Guard	6–3	195	Junior	Greenwood, Mississippi
3	Terrence Joyner	Guard	6–3	180	Senior	Mendenhall, Mississippi
5	Luka Pajkovic	Guard	6–2	195	Freshman	Belgrade, Serbia
11	Brent Arrington	Guard	6–2	181	Freshman	Baltimore, Maryland
12	Amos Studivant	Forward/Center	6–8	230	Senior	Bessemer, Alabama
21	Cor-J Cox	Guard	6–5	190	Senior	Washington, North Carolina
23	Falando Jones	Forward	6–4	212	Senior	Greenwood, Mississippi
25	Kevin Burwell	Guard	5–10	185	Senior	Philadelphia, Pennsylvania
32	Paul Crosby	Center	6–8	245	Senior	Lansing, Michigan
33	Blake Ralling	Guard	6–5	197	Freshman	Smyrna, Georgia
42	Jason Holmes	Forward	6–9	225	Senior	Chicago, Illinois

== Schedule ==
Date time, TV	Rank^{#}	Opponent^{#}	Result	Record	Site (attendance) city, state
Regular season
11/12/2011*; 1:00 pm		at Notre Dame	L 67–80	0–1	Edmund P. Joyce Center (7,087); South Bend, IN
11/14/2011*; 7:00 pm		at DePaul	L 70–80	0–2	Sullivan Athletic Center (3,286); Chicago, IL
11/20/2011*; 2:00 pm, FS South		at No. 1 North Carolina; Las Vegas Invitational	L 75–101	0–3	Dean E. Smith Center (18,160); Chapel Hill, NC
11/22/2011*; 7:00 pm, FS South		at South Carolina; Las Vegas Invitational	L 57–61	0–4	Colonial Life Arena (6,723); Columbia, SC
11/25/2011*; 1:30 pm		vs. Tennessee State; Las Vegas Invitational	W 90–89 ^{2OT}	1–4	Orleans Arena (7,200); Paradise, NV
11/26/2011*; 4:00 pm		vs. Cal Poly; Las Vegas Invitational	L 55–72	1–5	Orleans Arena (500); Las Vegas, NV
11/30/2011*; 7:00 pm		at Arkansas	L 64–97	1–6	Bud Walton Arena (11,446); Fayetteville, AR
12/02/2011*; 7:00 pm		at Northwestern	L 67–92	1–7	Welsh-Ryan Arena (4,705); Evanston, IL
12/10/2011*; 2:00 pm		at Ole Miss	L 56–80	1–8	Tad Smith Coliseum (5,585); Oxford, MS
12/19/2011*; 7:00 pm, FS South		at No. 11 Florida	L 54–82	1–9	O'Connell Center (8,025); Gainesville, FL
12/23/2011*; 2:00 pm, BTN		at No. 13 Wisconsin	L 45–79	1–10	Kohl Center (17,230); Madison, WI
12/31/2011*; 12:00 pm		at Iowa State	L 65–67	1–11	Hilton Coliseum (12,399); Ames, IA
01/03/2012; 7:30 pm		Arkansas–Pine Bluff	W 82–67	2–11 (1–0)	Harrison HPER Complex (3,497); Itta Bena, MS
01/07/2012; 4:30 pm		at Alabama State	W 67–60	3–11 (2–0)	Dunn–Oliver Acadome (1,912); Montgomery, AL
01/09/2012; 5:00 pm		at Alabama A&M	W 81–69	4–11 (3–0)	Elmore Gymnasium (NA); Normal, AL
01/14/2012; 4:30 pm		Alcorn State	W 85–66	5–11 (4–0)	Harrison HPER Complex (4,976); Itta Bena, MS
01/16/2012; 7:30 pm		Southern	W 77–56	6–11 (5–0)	Harrison HPER Complex (3,938); Itta Bena, MS
01/21/2012; 7:30 pm		at Prairie View A&M	W 81–57	7–11 (6–0)	William Nicks Building (3,311); Prairie View, TX
01/23/2012; 8:00 pm, ESPNU		at Texas Southern	W 77–69 ^{OT}	8–11 (7–0)	Health and Physical Education Arena (1,412); Houston, TX
01/28/2012; 4:30 pm		Jackson State	W 60–54	9–11 (8–0)	Harrison HPER Complex (5,301); Itta Bena, MS
01/30/2012; 7:30 pm		Grambling State	W 77–59	10–11 (9–0)	Harrison HPER Complex (3,209); Itta Bena, MS
02/04/2012; 4:30 pm		Alabama State	W 70–58	11–11 (10–0)	Harrison HPER Complex (3,445); Itta Bena, MS
02/06/2012; 7:30 pm		Alabama A&M	W 78–64	12–11 (11–0)	Harrison HPER Complex (3,091); Itta Bena, MS
02/11/2012; 4:30 pm		at Alcorn State	W 71–63	13–11 (12–0)	Davey Whitney Complex (2,000); Lorman, MS
02/13/2012; 7:30 pm		at Southern	W 58–53	14–11 (13–0)	F. G. Clark Center (2,062); Baton Rouge, LA
02/18/2012; 4:30 pm		Prairie View A&M	W 60–58	15–11 (14–0)	Harrison HPER Complex (3,098); Itta Bena, MS
02/20/2012; 8:00 pm, ESPNU		Texas Southern	W 56–53	16–11 (15–0)	Harrison HPER Complex (4,908); Itta Bena, MS
02/25/2012; 5:00 pm		at Grambling State	W 79–60	17–11 (16–0)	Fredrick C. Hobdy Assembly Center (NA); Grambling, LA
02/27/2012; 7:30 pm, ESPNU		at Jackson State	W 78–69	18–11 (17–0)	Williams Assembly Center (2,608); Jackson, MS
03/01/2012; 7:30 pm		at Arkansas–Pine Bluff	L 67–78	18–12 (17–1)	K. L. Johnson Complex (4,012); Pine Bluff, AR
2012 SWAC men's basketball tournament
03/07/2012; 8:00 pm		vs. Jackson State; Quarterfinals	W 63–60	19–12	Garland Special Events Center (NA); Garland, TX
03/09/2012; 8:00 pm		vs. Arkansas-Pine Bluff; Semifinals	W 71–64	20–12	Garland Special Events Center (NA); Garland, TX
03/10/2012; 7:00 pm, ESPNU		vs. Texas Southern; Championship Game	W 71–69	21–12	Garland Special Events Center (NA); Garland, TX
2012 NCAA tournament
03/13/2012*; 5:40 pm, truTV	(S 16)	vs. (S 16) WKU; First Four	L 58–59	21–13	UD Arena (8,510); Dayton, OH
*Non-conference game. ^{#}Rankings from AP Poll. (#) Tournament seedings in parentheses. All times are in Central Time (#) during NCAA Tournament is seed with Region.
