= 2011–12 Grambling State Tigers men's basketball team =

American college basketball season

2011–12 Grambling State Tigers men's basketball
- Conference: Southwestern Athletic Conference
- Record: 4–24 (4–14 SWAC)
- Head coach: Robert Washington (3rd season)
- Home arena: Fredrick C. Hobdy Assembly Center

2011–12 SWAC men's basketball standings
	Conf.				Overall
Team	W		L	PCT	W		L	PCT
Mississippi Valley State †	17	–	1	.944	21	–	13	.618
*Southern	13	–	5	.722	17	–	14	.548
Texas Southern	12	–	6	.667	15	–	18	.455
Prairie View A&M	10	–	8	.556	14	–	18	.438
Arkansas–Pine Bluff	9	–	9	.500	11	–	22	.333
Alabama State	9	–	9	.500	12	–	19	.387
Alcorn State	6	–	12	.333	10	–	22	.313
Alabama A&M	5	–	13	.278	7	–	21	.250
Jackson State	5	–	13	.278	7	–	24	.226
*Grambling State	4	–	14	.222	4	–	24	.143
† 2012 SWAC tournament winner As of March 13, 2012; Rankings from AP Poll; *Ineligible for conference tournament due to low APR

The 2011–12 Grambling State Tigers men's basketball team represented Grambling State University in the 2011–12 NCAA Division I men's basketball season. The Tigers, led by third-year head coach Robert Washington, played their home games at the Fredrick C. Hobdy Assembly Center in Grambling, Louisiana as members of the Southwestern Athletic Conference (SWAC). They finished the season 4–24, 4–14 in SWAC play to finish in last place. The Tigers had received a one-year postseason ban in May 2011 due to poor academic performance and thus failed to quality for the 2012 SWAC tournament. It was Washington's final season as head coach for the Tigers as he was dismissed on March 19, 2012.

== Roster ==
2011–12 Grambling State Tigers men's basketball team
Players
Coaches

Pos.	#	Name	Height	Weight	Year	Hometown
G	0	Derron Hobbs	6 ft 0 in (1.83 m)	160 lb (73 kg)	Sr	St. Louis, Missouri
G	2	Rondale Livas	5 ft 10 in (1.78 m)	150 lb (68 kg)	So	Houma, Louisiana
G	4	Xavier Rogers	6 ft 2 in (1.88 m)	—	So	Dallas, Texas
G	5	Brandon Dorsett	6 ft 0 in (1.83 m)	165 lb (75 kg)	So	Greensboro, North Carolina
G	10	Quincy Roberts	6 ft 5 in (1.96 m)	210 lb (95 kg)	Jr	Harrisburg, Pennsylvania
G/F	11	Bryant Purvis	6 ft 7 in (2.01 m)	215 lb (98 kg)	Jr	Trout, Louisiana
G	20	Roman Higgins	6 ft 3 in (1.91 m)	195 lb (88 kg)	So	Grambling, Louisiana
G	21	David Copeland	6 ft 2 in (1.88 m)	187 lb (85 kg)	Fr	Chesterfield, Virginia
F	23	Demetri Wheeler	6 ft 5 in (1.96 m)	223 lb (101 kg)	So	Birmingham, Alabama
C	40	Peter Roberson	7 ft 0 in (2.13 m)	245 lb (111 kg)	Jr	Oklahoma City, Oklahoma
F/C	42	Steven Danridge	6 ft 8 in (2.03 m)	260 lb (118 kg)	So	Dolton, Illinois
F	44	Thomas Williams	6 ft 7 in (2.01 m)	240 lb (109 kg)	So	Jonesboro, Alabama

Head coach

- Bobby Washington (Eastern Kentucky)

Assistant coach(es)

Legend

- (C) Team captain
- (S) Suspended
- (I) Ineligible
- (W) Walk-on
- Injured
- Current redshirt

Roster
Last update: June 26, 2020
