= 2011–12 Texas Southern Tigers basketball team =

American college basketball season

2011–12 Texas Southern Tigers men's basketball
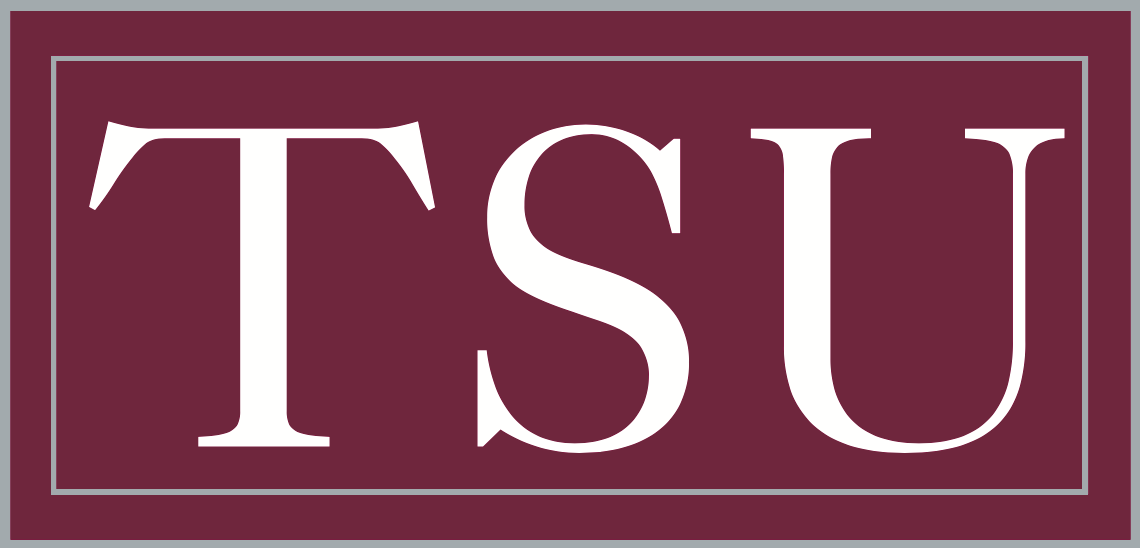
- Conference: Southwestern Athletic Conference
- Record: 15-18 (12-6 SWAC)
- Head coach: Tony Harvey (4th season)
- Assistant coaches: J. Keith LeGree; Marc Hsu; Walter Pitts
- Home arena: Health and Physical Education Arena

2011–12 SWAC men's basketball standings
	Conf.				Overall
Team	W		L	PCT	W		L	PCT
Mississippi Valley State †	17	–	1	.944	21	–	13	.618
*Southern	13	–	5	.722	17	–	14	.548
Texas Southern	12	–	6	.667	15	–	18	.455
Prairie View A&M	10	–	8	.556	14	–	18	.438
Arkansas–Pine Bluff	9	–	9	.500	11	–	22	.333
Alabama State	9	–	9	.500	12	–	19	.387
Alcorn State	6	–	12	.333	10	–	22	.313
Alabama A&M	5	–	13	.278	7	–	21	.250
Jackson State	5	–	13	.278	7	–	24	.226
*Grambling State	4	–	14	.222	4	–	24	.143
† 2012 SWAC tournament winner As of March 13, 2012; Rankings from AP Poll; *Ineligible for conference tournament due to low APR

The 2011–12 Texas Southern Tigers basketball team represented Texas Southern University during the 2011–12 NCAA Division I men's basketball season. The Tigers, led by fourth year head coach Tony Harvey, played their home games at the Health and Physical Education Arena as members of the Southwestern Athletic Conference. The Tigers finished the season 15–18 overall and 12–6 in SWAC conference play. They lost in the final of the 2012 SWAC men's basketball tournament 71–69 to Mississippi Valley State.

== Roster ==
2011–12 Texas Southern men's basketball team
Number	Name	Position	Height	Weight	Year	Hometown
1	Patrick Onwenu	Guard	6–7	200	Freshman	Detroit, Michigan
2	Dexter Ellington	Guard	6–1	173	Junior	Cuthbert, Georgia
3	Daniel King	Forward	6–8	199	Senior	Panama City, Panama
4	Fred Sturdivant	Forward	6–7	185	Junior	Chattanooga, Tennessee
5	Omar Strong	Guard	5–9	176	Junior	Baltimore, Maryland
11	Lawrence Johnson-Danner	Guard	6–4	180	Sophomore	Detroit, Michigan
12	DaQuan Joyner	Forward	6–7	240	Senior	Goldsboro, North Carolina
15	D'Angelo Scott	Forward	6–7	215	Junior	Los Angeles, California
20	Jabari Peters	Guard	6–4	170	Freshman	Brooklyn, New York
23	Keithrick Denson	Guard	6–7	227	Senior	Houston, Texas
25	Timothy Price	Forward	6–11	210	Senior	Houston, Texas
32	Aaron Clayborn	Forward	6-6	215	Sophomore	Benton Harbor, Michigan
34	Madarious Gibbs	Guard	6–0	180	Freshman	Newnan, Georgia
44	Myles Loving	Guard	6–1	185	Freshman	Houston, Texas

== Schedule ==
Date time, TV	Opponent	Result	Record	Site (attendance) city, state
Regular season
November 11, 2011*; 9:00 pm	at No. 12 Baylor	L 57-77	0–1	Ferrell Center (7,359); Waco, TX
November 15, 2011*; 7:00 pm	Eastern Michigan; Auto-Owners Insurance Spartan Invitational	W 66-49	1-1	H&PE Arena (1,103); Houston, TX
November 18, 2011*; 5:30 pm, ESPN3	at Michigan State; Auto-Owners Insurance Spartan Invitational	L 41-76	1–2	Breslin Center (14,797); East Lansing, MI
November 20, 2011*; 4:00 pm	at Milwaukee; Auto-Owners Insurance Spartan Invitational	L 38-73	1–3	UW-Milwaukee Panther Arena (2,531); Milwaukee, WI
November 26, 2011*; 6:00 pm	at IUPUI	L 55-74	1–4	IUPUI Gymnasium (774); Indianapolis, IN
November 29, 2011*; 6:00 pm	at Ball State	L 53-64	1–5	Worthen Arena (2,906); Muncie, IN
December 3, 2011*; 5:00 pm	at Denver	L 46-62	1–6	Magness Arena (2,790); Denver, CO
December 15, 2011*; 7:00 pm	at Northwestern	L 51-81	1–7	Welsh-Ryan Arena (4,905); Evanston, IL
December 19, 2011*; 8:00 pm	at Colorado State	L 61-85	1–8	Moby Arena (2,585); Fort Collins, CO
December 22, 2011*; 8:00 pm	at Colorado	L 51-56	1–9	CU Events Center (4,621); Boulder, CO
December 27, 2011*; 7:00 pm, FOXCS	at Saint Louis	L 39-71	1–10	Chaifetz Arena (8,044); St. Louis, MO
December 30, 2011*; 7:00 pm	at Arkansas	L 49-77	1–11	Bud Walton Arena (12,973); Fayetteville, AR
SWAC regular season
January 3, 2012*; 8:00 pm	Alcorn State	W 87-52	2-11 (1-0)	H&PE Arena (358); Houston, TX
January 5, 2012; 8:00 pm	Southern	W 63-57	3-11 (2-0)	H&PE Arena (1,008); Houston, TX
January 7, 2012; 6:00 pm	Prairie View A&M	W 84-49	4-11 (3-0)	H&PE Arena (2,187); Houston, TX
January 14, 2012; 5:30 pm	at Grambling State	W 61-57	5-11 (4-0)	Fredrick C. Hobdy Assembly Center (2,535); Grambling, LA
January 16, 2012; 8:00 pm	at Jackson State	L 51-54	5-12 (4-1)	Williams Assembly Center (715); Jackson, MS
January 21, 2012; 4:30 pm	Arkansas-Pine Bluff	W 69-55	6-12 (5-1)	H&PE Arena (1,231); Houston, TX
January 23, 2012; 8:00 pm, ESPNU	Mississippi Valley State	L 69-77 ^{OT}	6-13 (5-2)	H&PE Arena (1,412); Houston, TX
January 28, 2012; 5:00 pm	at Alabama A&M	W 73-61	7-13 (6-2)	Elmore Gymnasium (1,278); Normal, AL
January 30, 2012; 8:00 pm, ESPNU	at Alabama State	L 59-66 ^{OT}	7-14 (6-3)	Dunn-Oliver Acadome (4,518); Montgomery, AL
February 4, 2012; 7:30 pm	at Prairie View A&M	L 67-73	7-15 (6-4)	William Nicks Building (5,400); Prairie View, TX
February 11, 2012; 4:30 pm	Grambling State	W 72-54	8-15 (7-4)	H&PE Arena (854); Houston, TX
February 13, 2012; 8:00 pm	Jackson State	W 64-57	9-15 (8-4)	H&PE Arena (856); Houston, TX
February 18, 2012; 7:00 pm	at Arkansas-Pine Bluff	W 84-65	10-15 (9-4)	H.O. Clemmons Arena (2,782); Pine Bluff, AR
February 20, 2012; 6:00 pm, ESPNU	at Mississippi Valley State	L 53-56	10-16 (9-5)	Harrison HPER Complex (4,908); Itta Bena, MS
February 25, 2012; 4:30 pm	Alabama State	W 67-59	11-16 (10-5)	H&PE Arena (1,102); Houston, TX
February 27, 2012; 8:00 pm	Alabama A&M	W 69-59	12-16 (11-5)	H&PE Arena (2,301); Houston, TX
March 1, 2012; 7:00 pm	at Alcorn State	W 54-51	13-16 (12-5)	Davey Whitney Complex (200); Lorman, MS
March 3, 2012; 4:00 pm	at Southern	L 54-56	13-17 (12-6)	F. G. Clark Center (2,024); Baton Rouge, LA
SWAC men's basketball tournament
March 7, 2012; 12:30 pm	vs. Alabama A&M; Quarterfinal	W 75-62	14-17	Curtis Culwell Center; Garland, TX
March 9, 2012; 2:30 pm	vs. Alcorn State; Semifinal	W 60-55	15-17	Curtis Culwell Center; Garland, TX
March 10, 2012; 7:30 pm, ESPNU	vs. Mississippi Valley State; Final	L 69-71	15-18	Curtis Culwell Center; Garland, TX
*Non-conference game. ^{#}Rankings from AP Poll. (#) Tournament seedings in parentheses. All times are in Central Time.

== Statistical leaders ==
Points
Rank	Player	Points
1	Omar Strong	410
2	Fred Sturdivant	285
3	Dexter Ellington	203

Rebounds
Rank	Player	Rebounds
1	Fred Sturdivant	178
2	Aaron Clayborn	112
3	DaQuan Joyner	95

Assists
Rank	Player	Assists
1	Madarious Gibbs	61
2	Dexter Ellington	58
3	Omar Strong	51
