= 2010–11 Alabama State Hornets basketball team =

American college basketball season

2010–11 Alabama State Hornets basketball
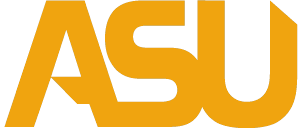

SWAC tournament champions

NCAA tournament, First Four
- Conference: Southwestern Athletic Conference
- Record: 17–18 (11–7 SWAC)
- Head coach: Lewis Jackson (6th season)
- Home arena: Dunn–Oliver Acadome

2010–11 SWAC men's basketball standings
	Conf.				Overall
Team	W		L	PCT	W		L	PCT
Texas Southern	16	–	2	.889	19	–	13	.594
Jackson State	12	–	6	.667	17	–	15	.531
Mississippi Valley State	12	–	6	.667	13	–	19	.406
Alabama State †	11	–	7	.611	17	–	18	.486
Alabama A&M	10	–	8	.556	13	–	15	.464
Grambling State	8	–	10	.444	12	–	21	.364
Prairie View A&M	7	–	11	.389	10	–	22	.313
Arkansas–Pine Bluff	7	–	11	.389	7	–	24	.226
Alcorn State	4	–	14	.222	4	–	24	.143
Southern	3	–	15	.167	4	–	26	.133
† 2011 SWAC tournament winner As of March 13, 2012; Rankings from AP Poll

The 2010–11 Alabama State Hornets basketball team represented Alabama State University during the 2010–11 NCAA Division I men's basketball season. The Hornets, led by sixth-year head coach Lewis Jackson, played their home games at the Dunn–Oliver Acadome in Montgomery, Alabama as members of the Southwestern Athletic Conference (SWAC). After finishing fourth in the SWAC regular season standings, the Hornets won the SWAC tournament, earning the opportunity to play in the NCAA tournament. Alabama State was beaten in the First Four by UTSA to finish the season 17–18 (11–7 SWAC).

== Roster ==
2010–11 Alabama State Hornets men's basketball team
Players
Coaches

Pos.	#	Name	Height	Weight	Year	Previous school	Hometown
F	00	Chris Duncan	6 ft 8 in (2.03 m)	200 lb (91 kg)	Sr		Louisville, Kentucky
F	2	Tramayne Moorer	6 ft 5 in (1.96 m)	220 lb (100 kg)	Sr		Mosses, Alabama
G	20	Kenderek Washington	6 ft 4 in (1.93 m)	185 lb (84 kg)	Jr		Utica, Mississippi
G	21	Tramaine Butler	6 ft 2 in (1.88 m)	189 lb (86 kg)	Jr		Detroit, Michigan

Head coach

- Lewis Jackson (Alabama State)

Assistant coach(es)

Legend

- (C) Team captain
- (S) Suspended
- (I) Ineligible
- (W) Walk-on
- Injured
- Current redshirt

Roster

== Schedule and results ==
Date time, TV	Rank^{#}	Opponent^{#}	Result	Record	Site city, state
Regular Season
November 12, 2010*		at Creighton; Global Sports Hy-Vee Challenge	L 57–71	0–1	Qwest Center Omaha (15,141); Omaha, NE
November 14, 2010*		at Iowa State; Global Sports Hy-Vee Challenge	L 47–74	0–2	Hilton Coliseum (12,453); Ames, IA
November 16, 2010*		at Northern Arizona; Global Sports Hy-Vee Challenge	L 46–74	0–3	Tim's Toyota Center; Prescott Valley, AZ
November 20, 2010*		Kennesaw State; Global Sports Hy-Vee Challenge	W 74–59	1–3	Dunn–Oliver Acadome; Montgomery, AL
November 22, 2010*		at Loyola Chicago	L 46–74	1–4	Joseph J. Gentile Center; Chicago, IL
November 27, 2010*		at UCF	L 48–84	1–5	UCF Arena; Orlando, FL
November 30, 2010*		at Tulane	L 69–84	1–6	Avron B. Fogelman Arena; New Orleans, LA
December 11, 2010*		at Arkansas State	L 53–77	1–7	Convocation Center; Jonesboro, AR
December 14, 2010*		at Mississippi State	L 46–67	1–8	Humphrey Coliseum; Starkville, MS
December 16, 2010*		Oakwood	W 54–49	2–8	Dunn–Oliver Acadome; Montgomery, AL
December 20, 2010*		Belmont	L 53–66	2–9	Dunn–Oliver Acadome; Montgomery, AL
December 22, 2010*		at SMU	L 38–49	2–10	Moody Coliseum; Dallas, TX
December 30, 2010*		Albany State	W 61–53	3–10	Dunn–Oliver Acadome; Montgomery, AL
January 4, 2011		Jackson State	L 52–58 ^{OT}	3–11 (0–1)	Dunn–Oliver Acadome; Montgomery, AL
January 6, 2011		Grambling State	W 50–47	4–11 (1–1)	Dunn–Oliver Acadome; Montgomery, AL
January 8, 2011		at Arkansas–Pine Bluff	W 68–62 ^{OT}	5–11 (2–1)	K. L. Johnson Complex; Pine Bluff, AR
January 10, 2011; 9:00 p.m.		at Mississippi Valley State	L 70–74	5–12 (2–2)	Harrison HPER Complex (1,086); Itta Bena, MS
January 15, 2011		at Alabama A&M	L 60–75	5–13 (2–3)	Elmore Gymnasium; Huntsville, AL
January 22, 2011		Southern	L 52–64	5–14 (2–4)	Dunn–Oliver Acadome; Montgomery, AL
January 24, 2011		Alcorn State	W 81–68	6–14 (3–4)	Dunn–Oliver Acadome; Montgomery, AL
January 29, 2011		at Prairie View A&M	L 61–69	6–15 (3–5)	William J. Nicks Building; Prairie View, TX
January 31, 2011; 5:30 p.m.		at Texas Southern	L 59–73	6–16 (3–6)	Health and Physical Education Arena (1,637); Houston, TX
February 5, 2011		Arkansas–Pine Bluff	W 60–48	7–16 (4–6)	Dunn–Oliver Acadome; Montgomery, AL
February 7, 2011; 7:00 p.m.		Mississippi Valley State	W 90–63	8–16 (5–6)	Dunn–Oliver Acadome (2,117); Montgomery, AL
February 12, 2011		Alabama A&M	W 82–68	9–16 (6–6)	Dunn–Oliver Acadome; Montgomery, AL
February 19, 2011		at Southern	W 63–50	10–16 (7–6)	F. G. Clark Center; Baton Rouge, LA
February 21, 2011		at Alcorn State	W 62–53	11–16 (8–6)	Davey Whitney Complex; Lorman, MS
February 26, 2011		Prairie View A&M	W 68–61	12–16 (9–6)	Dunn–Oliver Acadome; Montgomery, AL
February 28, 2011; 9:00 p.m.		Texas Southern	W 60–48	13–16 (10–6)	Dunn–Oliver Acadome (2,439); Montgomery, AL
March 3, 2011		at Jackson State	W 63–53	14–16 (11–6)	Williams Assembly Center; Jackson, MS
March 5, 2011		at Grambling State	L 73–74	14–17 (11–7)	Fredrick C. Hobdy Assembly Center; Grambling, LA
SWAC tournament
March 10, 2011	(4)	vs. (5) Alabama A&M; SWAC Quarterfinals	W 81–61	15–17	Curtis Culwell Center; Garland, TX
March 11, 2011; 9:00 p.m.	(4)	vs. (1) Texas Southern; SWAC Semifinals	W 73–66	16–17	Curtis Culwell Center; Garland, TX
March 12, 2011	(4)	vs. (6) Grambling; SWAC Championship	W 65–48	17–17	Curtis Culwell Center; Garland, TX
NCAA tournament
March 16, 2011	(16 E)	vs. (16 E) UTSA; NCAA First Four	L 61–70	17–18	University of Dayton Arena; Dayton, OH
*Non-conference game. ^{#}Rankings from AP Poll. (#) Tournament seedings in parentheses. All times are in Central.
