= 2011 SWAC men's basketball tournament =

- Classification: Division I
- Season: 2010–11
- Teams: 8
- Site: Garland Special Events Center; Garland, Texas
- Champions: Alabama State (4th title)
- Winning coach: Lewis Jackson (2nd title)
- Television: ESPNU

2010–11 SWAC men's basketball standings
	Conf.				Overall
Team	W		L	PCT	W		L	PCT
Texas Southern	16	–	2	.889	19	–	13	.594
Jackson State	12	–	6	.667	17	–	15	.531
Mississippi Valley State	12	–	6	.667	13	–	19	.406
Alabama State †	11	–	7	.611	17	–	18	.486
Alabama A&M	10	–	8	.556	13	–	15	.464
Grambling State	8	–	10	.444	12	–	21	.364
Prairie View A&M	7	–	11	.389	10	–	22	.313
Arkansas–Pine Bluff	7	–	11	.389	7	–	24	.226
Alcorn State	4	–	14	.222	4	–	24	.143
Southern	3	–	15	.167	4	–	26	.133
† 2011 SWAC tournament winner As of March 13, 2012; Rankings from AP Poll

The 2011 SWAC men's basketball tournament took place March 9–12 at the Garland Special Events Center in Garland, Texas. The top eight teams in the conference standings qualified for the tournament. Alabama State, the winner of the tournament, received the Southwestern Athletic Conference's automatic bid to the 2011 NCAA tournament. The tournament's championship game was televised on ESPNU.

== Bracket ==
Quarterfinals; March 9–10
1	Texas Southern	50
8	Arkansas–Pine Bluff	45
4	Alabama State	81
5	Alabama A&M	61
3	Mississippi Valley State	62
6	Grambling State	65
2	Jackson State	50
7	Prairie View A&M	38

Semifinals; March 11
1	Texas Southern	66
4	Alabama State	73
6	Grambling State	81
2	Jackson State	75^{OT}

Finals; March 12
4	Alabama State	65
6	Grambling State	48
