= 2012 SWAC men's basketball tournament =

- Classification: Division I
- Season: 2011–12
- Teams: 8
- Site: Garland Special Events Center; Garland, Texas
- Champions: Mississippi Valley State (5th title)
- Television: ESPNU

2011–12 SWAC men's basketball standings
	Conf.				Overall
Team	W		L	PCT	W		L	PCT
Mississippi Valley State †	17	–	1	.944	21	–	13	.618
*Southern	13	–	5	.722	17	–	14	.548
Texas Southern	12	–	6	.667	15	–	18	.455
Prairie View A&M	10	–	8	.556	14	–	18	.438
Arkansas–Pine Bluff	9	–	9	.500	11	–	22	.333
Alabama State	9	–	9	.500	12	–	19	.387
Alcorn State	6	–	12	.333	10	–	22	.313
Alabama A&M	5	–	13	.278	7	–	21	.250
Jackson State	5	–	13	.278	7	–	24	.226
*Grambling State	4	–	14	.222	4	–	24	.143
† 2012 SWAC tournament winner As of March 13, 2012; Rankings from AP Poll; *Ineligible for conference tournament due to low APR

The 2012 SWAC men's basketball tournament took place March 7–10 at the Garland Special Events Center in Garland, Texas. The winner of the tournament received the Southwestern Athletic Conference's automatic bid to the 2012 NCAA tournament.

== Format ==
Eight teams qualified for the tournament. Southern and Grambling each received one-year postseason bans in men’s basketball, thus not allowed to participate in the 2012 SWAC Tournament, due to failing to meet the NCAA's Academic Progress Rate requirements. The rest of the seeds were determined after the final games were played

== Bracket ==
Quarterfinals; March 7–8
1	Mississippi Valley State	63
8	Jackson State	60
4	Alabama State	56^{OT}
5	Arkansas–Pine Bluff	60
2	Texas Southern	75
7	Alabama A&M	62
3	Prairie View A&M	79
6	Alcorn State	103

Semifinals; March 9
1	Mississippi Valley State	71
5	Arkansas–Pine Bluff	64
2	Texas Southern	60
6	Alcorn State	55

Championship Game; March 10
1	Mississippi Valley State	71
2	Texas Southern	69
