= Chief Kickingstallionsims =

American basketball player (born 1986)

Personal information
- Born: September 15, 1986 (age 40) Pompano Beach, Florida, U.S.
- Listed height: 7 ft 1 in (2.16 m)
- Listed weight: 265 lb (120 kg)

Career information
- High school: Blanche Ely (Pompano Beach, Florida)
- College: Stetson (2004–2006); Alabama State (2007–2009)
- NBA draft: 2009: undrafted
- Playing career: 2009–2015
- Position: Center

Career history
- 2009–2010: ENAD
- 2012–2013: BC Timba Timișoara
- 2013–2014: Al-Ahli Jeddah
- 2014–2015: Gran Canion de Urique

Career highlights
- Romanian League All-Star (2013); SWAC Defensive Player of the Year (2009)

Grlenntys Chief Kickingstallionsims Jr. (born September 15, 1986) is an American professional basketball player who last played for Gran Canion de Urique of the Mexico Liga Premier. He competed at the collegiate level with the Alabama State Hornets and Stetson Hatters. Sports Illustrated listed Kickingstallionsims's name as one of the "Great Names in Sports" in 2012, and Bleacher Report listed the name on its top 10 in 2009. Kickingstallionsims has previously appeared for many professional teams, including BC Timba Timișoara and ENAD.

== Collegiate career ==
=== Freshman ===
After completing his high school tenure, Kickingstallionsims was approached by and eventually signed by the Stetson Hatters men's basketball team at the collegiate level. He made his debut on December 28, 2004, finishing with 2 points, 1 rebound, and 2 blocks off the bench against Colorado State. He blocked a season-high 4 shots in a win over Campbell on January 31, 2005. Kickingstallionsims finished the year averaging 0.6 points, 1.3 rebounds, and 0.7 blocks. He started in 0 of 11 appearances for the Hatters.

=== Sophomore ===
Kickingstallionsims played 10 minutes in a loss to North Carolina State to open his sophomore season. He added 2 points on 1-of-1 shooting. On December 27, 2005, he contributed a career-high 11 points against the Miami Hurricanes. It was the first game in which Kickingstallionsims scored double-digits. However, he failed to become an entrenched starter for Stetson. He ended the season with averages of 2.4 points, 1.8 rebounds, and 0.7 blocks. In the 32 games he competed in for the Hatters, Kickingstallionsims recorded a total of 22 blocked shots.

=== Junior ===
On June 6, 2006, it was announced by Stetson head coach Derek Waugh that Kickingstallionsims would transfer to another program. Waugh said, "We wish Chief success in his future endeavors." He sat out for the 2006–07 season per NCAA transfer rules. It was made known that he would begin playing for Alabama State upon head coach Lewis Jackson's announcement. Jackson spoke on the center's arrival, "We are expecting him to give an inside presence."

Kickingstallionsims debuted for the Alabama State Hornets on November 10, 2007, against Paul Quinn College. He completed the game with 14 points, 6 rebounds, and 3 blocks, and was named starting center. Kickingstallionsims broke his career-high single-game points total on December 20, 2007, in a victory over Auburn University at Montgomery. He recorded his first double-double on January 2, 2008, against UAB, with 11 points and 11 rebounds. On March 8, 2008, in a 20-point defeat against Jackson State, Kickingstallionsims scored a career-best 22 points. By the end of the season, he was averaging 7.7 points, 3.6 rebounds, and 0.7 blocks in 16 minutes per contest.

=== Senior ===
Kickingstallionsims made his debut as a senior for the Hornets on December 15, 2008, against Ole Miss. He finished with 6 points, 5 rebounds, and 3 blocks. On January 5, 2009, vs Grambling State, Kickingstallionsims scored a career-high 23 points. He further improved on January 26, 2009, against the Alcorn State Braves, posting 24 points on 11-of-12 shooting. However, Alcorn State rallied and pulled off the upset win. Kickinstallionsims finished his final collegiate season with career-high scoring, rebounding, and shot-blocking numbers. He averaged 8.5 points, 4.0 boards, and 2.4 blocks. Kickingstallionsims was also named Southwestern Athletic Conference (SWAC) Defensive Player of the Year.

== Professional career ==
After going undrafted in the 2009 NBA draft, Kickingstallionsims went to pre-draft workouts for the Dallas Mavericks and New York Knicks. He then signed with ENAD of the Cyprus Basketball Division 1 for the 2009–10 season. He led in the league in blocks and ranked fifth in rebounds. At the conclusion of the season, Kickingstallionsims averaged 10.7 points, 6.5 rebounds, and 2.2 blocks a game. He later attended offseason training with the Los Angeles Lakers of the NBA. However, he could not play for the next two years due to illness. After recovering, Kickingstallionsims signed with the Romanian team, BC Timba Timișoara, who competed in the Liga Națională. In the shot-blocking category, he finished fourth and was named an All-Star. He averaged 7.8 points, 4.2 rebounds, and 1.4 blocks per game. Following the end of the season, he was drafted by the Austin Toros in the third round of the 2013 NBA Development League Draft. The Toros waived him on November 18, 2013. Kickingstallionsims was landed by Al-Ahli Jeddah of the Saudi Premier League on January 10, 2014. He finished the season averaging 17.4 points, 14.2 rebounds, 1.1 assists, and 4.5 blocks. He then signed with Gran Canion de Urique in Mexico, averaging 10.1 points, 8.4 rebounds, and 2.8 blocks through his first season.

== Personal life ==
Kickingstallionsims was born on September 15, 1986, in Broward County, Florida, to Grlenntys Chief Kickingstallionsims Sr. and Barbara R. Paulson. He has a sister, Chelsea E. Kickingstallionsims, who attended Atlantic High School. Kickingstallionsims is a member of the Navajo Nation. His first name, Grlenntys, means "strength of falling rock." Kickingstallionsims moved to Boynton Beach, Florida, in 1993. He moved from high school to high school never quitting on his dream of playing professional basketball. He played varsity basketball for Blanche Ely High School, and he even joined the volleyball team his senior year. Kickingstallionsims loves spending time with family and enjoys cooking.
