= 2009 SWAC men's basketball tournament =

Collegiate competition in Alabama, US

- Classification: Division I
- Season: 2008–09
- Teams: 8
- Site: Fair Park Arena; Birmingham, Alabama
- Champions: Alabama State (3rd title)
- Winning coach: Lewis Jackson (1st title)
- MVP: Andrew Hayles (Alabama State)

2008–09 SWAC men's basketball standings
	Conf.				Overall
Team	W		L	PCT	W		L	PCT
Alabama State †	16	–	2	.889	22	–	10	.688
Jackson State	15	–	3	.833	18	–	15	.545
Prairie View A&M	12	–	6	.667	17	–	16	.515
Arkansas–Pine Bluff	11	–	7	.611	13	–	18	.419
Southern	8	–	10	.444	8	–	23	.258
Mississippi Valley State	7	–	11	.389	7	–	25	.219
Texas Southern	7	–	11	.389	7	–	25	.219
Alabama A&M	6	–	12	.333	8	–	19	.296
Grambling State	4	–	14	.222	6	–	23	.207
Alcorn State	4	–	14	.222	6	–	25	.194
† 2009 SWAC tournament winner As of March 12, 2009; Rankings from AP Poll

The 2009 Southwestern Athletic Conference men's basketball tournament took place from March 11–14, 2009 at Fair Park Arena in Birmingham, Alabama.

== Format ==
The top eight eligible men's basketball teams in the Southwestern Athletic Conference received a berth in the conference tournament. After the conference season, teams were seeded by conference record.

== Bracket ==
Quarterfinals; March 11 – March 12
1	Alabama State	70
8	Alabama A&M	58
4	Arkansas–Pine Bluff	65
5	Southern	58
3	Prairie View A&M	65
6	Mississippi Valley State	60
7	Texas Southern	65
2	Jackson State	72

Semifinals; March 13
1	Alabama State	63
4	Arkansas–Pine Bluff	55
3	Prairie View A&M	53
2	Jackson State	66

Finals; March 14
1	Alabama State	65
2	Jackson State	58
