= 2010–11 Texas Southern Tigers basketball team =

American college basketball season

2010–11 Texas Southern Tigers men's basketball
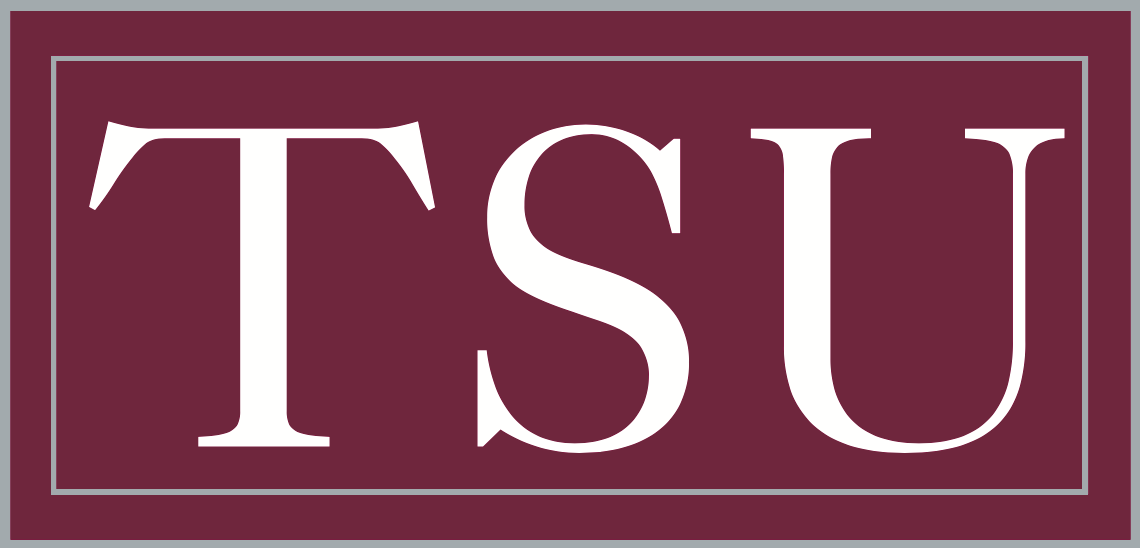

SWAC regular season champions

NIT, First round
- Conference: Southwestern Athletic Conference
- Record: 19–13 (16–2 SWAC)
- Head coach: Tony Harvey (3rd season)
- Assistant coaches: J. Keith LeGree (1st season); Walter Pitts (1st season)
- Home arena: Health and Physical Education Arena

2010–11 SWAC men's basketball standings
	Conf.				Overall
Team	W		L	PCT	W		L	PCT
Texas Southern	16	–	2	.889	19	–	13	.594
Jackson State	12	–	6	.667	17	–	15	.531
Mississippi Valley State	12	–	6	.667	13	–	19	.406
Alabama State †	11	–	7	.611	17	–	18	.486
Alabama A&M	10	–	8	.556	13	–	15	.464
Grambling State	8	–	10	.444	12	–	21	.364
Prairie View A&M	7	–	11	.389	10	–	22	.313
Arkansas–Pine Bluff	7	–	11	.389	7	–	24	.226
Alcorn State	4	–	14	.222	4	–	24	.143
Southern	3	–	15	.167	4	–	26	.133
† 2011 SWAC tournament winner As of March 13, 2012; Rankings from AP Poll

The 2010–11 Texas Southern Tigers basketball team represented Texas Southern University during the 2010–11 NCAA Division I men's basketball season. The Tigers, led by 3rd-year head coach Tony Harvey, played their home games at the Health and Physical Education Arena and were members of the Southwestern Athletic Conference. They finished the season 19–13 and 16–2 in SWAC play to finish in first place. They defeated Arkansas–Pine Bluff in the quarterfinals of the SWAC Basketball tournament before being upset by eventual champion Alabama State in the semifinals. They were invited to the 2011 National Invitation Tournament where they lost in the first round to Colorado.

== Previous season ==
The Tigers finished the 2009–10 season 17–16 overall; 11–7 in SWAC play. They were not invited to either the NCAA tournament or the NIT.

== Roster ==
2010–11 Texas Southern Tigers men's basketball team
Players
Coaches

Pos.	#	Name	Height	Weight	Year	Hometown
G	1	Nicos Norris	6 ft 4 in (1.93 m)	188 lb (85 kg)	Fr	Jackson, MS
F	3	Daniel King	6 ft 8 in (2.03 m)	199 lb (90 kg)	Jr	Panama City, Panama
G	5	Harrison Smith	6 ft 3 in (1.91 m)	205 lb (93 kg)	Sr	Houston, TX
G	11	Lawrence Johnson-Danner	6 ft 4 in (1.93 m)	180 lb (82 kg)	Fr	Detroit, MI
F	13	Kevin Galloway	6 ft 7 in (2.01 m)	215 lb (98 kg)	Sr	Sacramento, CA
G	15	Abdallah Boune	6 ft 5 in (1.96 m)	190 lb (86 kg)	Sr	Paris, France
F	23	Keithtrick Denson	6 ft 7 in (2.01 m)	227 lb (103 kg)	Jr	Houston, TX
F	24	Travele Jones	6 ft 8 in (2.03 m)	205 lb (93 kg)	Sr	Los Angeles, CA
F	25	Timothy Price	6 ft 11 in (2.11 m)	210 lb (95 kg)	Jr	Houston, TX
F	32	Aaron Clayborn	6 ft 6 in (1.98 m)	215 lb (98 kg)	So	Benton Harbor, MI
G	30	Justin Ray	5 ft 7 in (1.7 m)	160 lb (73 kg)	Sr	Gulfport, MS
G		Vanderis Christie	5 ft 11 in (1.8 m)	180 lb (82 kg)	So	Houston, TX

Head coach

- Tony Harvey (Cameron)

Assistant coach(es)

- J. Keith LeGree (Cincinnati)
- Walter Pitts (Alabama)

Legend

- (C) Team captain
- (S) Suspended
- (I) Ineligible
- (W) Walk-on
- Injured
- Current redshirt

== Schedule and results ==
Date time, TV	Rank^{#}	Opponent^{#}	Result	Record	High points	High rebounds	High assists	Site (attendance) city, state
Non-conference regular season
November 13, 2010*; 8:05 pm		at Drake	L 46–60	0–1	12 – Smith	7 – Tied	6 – Galloway	Knapp Center (3,661); Des Moines, IA
November 16, 2023*; 8:05 pm		at Wichita State	L 67–79	0–2	22 – Johnson-Danner	8 – Galloway	8 – Galloway	Charles Koch Arena (10,387); Wichita, KS
November 18, 2010*; 8:00 pm		at Oklahoma	L 52–82	0–3	19 – Galloway	6 – Clayborn	7 – Galloway	Lloyd Noble Center (7,767); Norman, OK
November 21, 2011*; 7:30 pm		at Oregon State	W 66–60	1–3	25 – Johnson-Danner	6 – Tied	12 – Galloway	Gill Coliseum (5,436); Corvallis, OR
November 23, 2010*; 10:00 pm, CSNNW		at Oregon	L 52–75	1–4	18 – Galloway	5 – Tied	2 – Galloway	McArthur Court (6,138); Eugene, OR
November 26, 2010*; 8:00 pm, Cox		at No. 4 Kansas State	L 60–84	1–5	18 – Johnson-Danner	4 – Galloway	10 – Galloway	Bramlage Coliseum (12,528); Manhattan, KS
December 4, 2010*; 8:00 pm		North Texas	L 64–70	1–6	16 – Johnson-Danner	7 – Clayborn	10 – Galloway	H&PE Arena (1,023); Houston, TX
December 12, 2010*; 6:30 pm, Mediacom		at Iowa State	L 54–65	1–7	22 – Jones	10 – King	4 – Galloway	Hilton Coliseum (12,622); Ames, IA
December 16, 2010*; 8:05 pm		vs. Texas State	W 78–64	2–7	20 – Jones	11 – Jones	9 – Galloway	Strahan Arena; San Marcos, TX
December 22, 2010*; 8:00 pm		at Arkansas	L 59–67	2–8	15 – Jones	8 – King	6 – Galloway	Bud Walton Arena (12,076); Fayetteville, AR
January 2, 2011*; 3:30 pm, FSSW		at No. 23 Baylor	L 60–68	2–9	21 – Jones	12 – Galloway	4 – Galloway	Ferrell Center (5,437); Waco, TX
SWAC regular season
January 4, 2011; 8:30 pm		at Southern	W 81–74 ^{OT}	3–9 (1–0)	25 – Jones	13 – Galloway	5 – Galloway	F. G. Clark Center (377); Baton Rouge, LA
January 6, 2011; 9:00 pm		at Alcorn State	W 79–66	4–9 (2–0)	15 – Tied	11 – King	4 – Galloway	Davey Whitney Complex (635); Lorman, MS
January 8, 2011; 8:30 pm		at Prairie View A&M	W 58–51	5–9 (3–0)	16 – Smith	10 – King	2 – Galloway	William Nicks Building (3,882); Prairie View, TX
January 15, 2011; 3:00 pm		Jackson State	W 66–62	6–9 (4–0)	15 – Johnson-Danner	9 – Galloway	8 – Galloway	H&PE Arena (1,132); Houston, TX
January 17, 2011; 9:00 pm		Grambling State	W 66–41	7–9 (5–0)	17 – Jones	12 – Galloway	10 – Galloway	H&PE Arena (1,012); Houston, TX
January 22, 2011; 9:00 pm		at Arkansas–Pine Bluff	W 50–43	8–9 (6–0)	15 – Jones	6 – Galloway	3 – Galloway	K. L. Johnson Complex (3,871); Pine Bluff, AR
January 24, 2011; 7:00 pm		at Mississippi Valley State	L 76–89	8–10 (6–1)	20 – Tied	12 – King	3 – Tied	Harrison HPER Complex (3,709); Itta Bena, MS
January 29, 2011; 5:30 pm		Alabama A&M	W 65–61	9–10 (7–1)	18 – Smith	11 – Jones	5 – Galloway	H&PE Arena (1,103); Houston, TX
January 31, 2011; 5:30 pm		Alabama State	W 73–59	10–10 (8–1)	18 – Jones	7 – Galloway	7 – Galloway	H&PE Arena (1,637); Houston, TX
February 5, 2011; 7:30 pm		Prairie View A&M	W 63–58	11–10 (9–1)	20 – Jones	12 – Jones	7 – Galloway	H&PE Arena (5,578); Houston, TX
February 12, 2011; 6:30 pm		at Jackson State	W 70–67	12–10 (10–1)	22 – Jones	13 – Jones	2 – Tied	Williams Assembly Center (2,002); Jackson, MS
February 14, 2011; 9:00 pm		at Grambling State	W 51–49	13–10 (11–1)	11 – King	7 – King	4 – Galloway	Fredrick C. Hobdy Assembly Center (1,185); Grambling, LA
February 19, 2011; 5:30 pm		Arkansas–Pine Bluff	W 71–68	14–10 (12–1)	15 – Johnson-Danner	7 – King	10 – Galloway	H&PE Arena (1,103); Houston, TX
February 21, 2011; 9:00 pm		Mississippi Valley State	W 58–55 ^{OT}	15–10 (13–1)	17 – Jones	8 – Galloway	7 – Galloway	H&PE Arena (1,322); Houston, TX
February 26, 2011; 7:30 pm		at Alabama A&M	W 83–78 ^{OT}	16–10 (14–1)	19 – Smith	8 – Galloway	10 – Galloway	Elmore Gymnasium (1,786); Normal, AL
February 28, 2011; 9:00 pm		at Alabama State	L 48–60	16–11 (14–2)	18 – Smith	6 – Tied	2 – Tied	Dunn–Oliver Acadome (2,439); Montgomery, AL
March 3, 2011; 9:00 pm		Southern	W 71–63	17–11 (15–2)	32 – Galloway	8 – Galloway	4 – Galloway	H&PE Arena (2,114); Houston, TX
March 5, 2011; 5:30 pm		Alcorn State	W 79–68	18–11 (16–2)	16 – Smith	12 – Galloway	8 – Galloway	H&PE Arena (1,005); Houston, TX
SWAC tournament
March 9, 2011; 9:00 pm	(1)	vs. (8) Arkansas–Pine Bluff; Quarterfinals	W 50–45	19–11	19 – Jones	9 – Jones	5 – Galloway	Garland Special Events Center; Garland, TX
March 11, 2011; 9:00 pm	(1)	vs. (4) Alabama State; Semifinals	L 66–73	19–12	24 – Smith	5 – Tied	8 – Galloway	Garland Special Events Center; Garland, TX
National Invitation Tournament
March 16, 2011*; 9:00 pm, ESPN3	(8 C)	at (1 C) Colorado; First Round	L 74–88	19–13	24 – Smith	6 – Tied	11 – Galloway	CU Events Center (6,299); Boulder, CO
*Non-conference game. ^{#}Rankings from AP Poll. (#) Tournament seedings in parentheses. All times are in Central.
