= Chris Wright (basketball coach) =

American basketball coach

Current position
- Title: Head coach
- Team: Alabama State
- Conference: SWAC
- Record: 2–3 (.400)

Biographical details
- Education: Texas

Coaching career (HC unless noted)
- 2002–2003: Prestonwood Christian Academy (assistant)
- 2003–2005: St. Edward's (assistant)
- 2005–2006: Texas State (assistant)
- 2006–2009: Fresno Pacific (assistant)
- 2009–2010: Fresno Pacific (associate HC)
- 2010–2014: Fresno Pacific
- 2014–2015: Arkansas Tech (assistant)
- 2015–2016: Graceland
- 2016–2017: Angelo State (assistant)
- 2017–2018: Central Baptist
- 2018–2022: Talladega
- 2022–2026: Langston
- 2026–present: Alabama State

Head coaching record
- Overall: 334–124 (.729)

Chris Wright is an American basketball coach. He is currently the head coach of the Alabama State Hornets basketball team.

== Career ==
After graduating from the University of Texas, Wright began his coaching career as an assistant at Prestonwood Christian Academy. He then served as an assistant at St. Edward's, Texas State, and Fresno Pacific. In 2009, Wright was promoted to head coach at Fresno Pacific. He served as head coach for four seasons, compiling a 67–53 overall record before resigning. After spending a season as an assistant at Arkansas Tech, Wright was named the head coach at Graceland. In one season as the team's head coach, he led Graceland to a 17–14 record, posting only the second winning season in 21 years. Wright then served as an assistant at Angelo State and head coach at Central Baptist for one season. Wright took the Mustangs to the first program’s first ever NAIA National Tournament before being named the head coach at Talladega in 2018. In four seasons at Talladega, he totaled a 105–26 overall record and led the Tornadoes to four straight appearances in the NAIA National Tournament. In his final season, Dega advanced to the NAIA National Championship game becoming the first HBCU to do so since 1987. In 2022, Wright was named the head coach at Langston, taking over a program that won a total of one game in the previous two seasons combined. Wright ingested the greatest single season turnaround in the history of college basketball by leading the Lions to a 31-3 record in his first year. The program went on two play in two NAIA National Championship games in his final three seasons. In four seasons at Langston, he totaled a combined 121-21 record.

On April 10, 2026, Wright was named the next head coach at Alabama State, replacing Tony Madlock.

== Head coaching record ==
Record table
| Season | Team | Overall | Conference | Standing | Postseason |
|---|---|---|---|---|---|
Fresno Pacific Sunbirds (GSAC) (2010–2012)
| 2010–11 | Fresno Pacific | 20–11 | 12–8 | T–4th | |
| 2011–12 | Fresno Pacific | 15–16 | 6–12 | 8th | |
Fresno Pacific Sunbirds (PacWest) (2012–2014)
| 2012–13 | Fresno Pacific | 21–9 | 14–4 | T–2nd | |
| 2013–14 | Fresno Pacific | 11–17 | 6–14 | T–9th | |
| Fresno Pacific: | | 67–53 (.558) | 38–38 (.500) | | |
Graceland Yellowjackets (The Heart) (2015–2016)
| 2015–16 | Graceland | 17–14 | 11–11 | 5th | |
| Graceland: | | 17–14 (.548) | 11–11 (.500) | | |
Central Baptist Mustangs (AMC) (2017–2018)
| 2017–18 | Central Baptist | 21–9 | 16–6 | T–2nd | NAIA Division I First Round |
| Central Baptist: | | 21–9 (.700) | 16–6 (.727) | | |
Talladega Tornadoes (GCAC) (2018–2021)
| 2018–19 | Talladega | 24–8 | 11–3 | 2nd | NAIA Division I First Round |
| 2019–20 | Talladega | 25–7 | 9–5 | 3rd | |
| 2020–21 | Talladega | 25–4 | 8–0 | 1st | NAIA Second Round |
Talladega Tornadoes (SSAC) (2021–2022)
| 2021–22 | Talladega | 32–6 | 15–3 | 2nd | NAIA Runner-up |
| Talladega: | | 105–26 (.802) | 43–11 (.796) | | |
Langston Lions (SAC) (2022–2026)
| 2022–23 | Langston | 31–3 | 20–2 | 1st | NAIA Round of 16 |
| 2023–24 | Langston | 35–2 | 21–1 | 1st | NAIA Runner-up |
| 2024–25 | Langston | 26–8 | 17–7 | 2nd | NAIA Round of 16 |
| 2025–26 | Langston | 29–8 | 17–5 | 2nd | NAIA Runner-up |
| Langston: | | 121–21 (.852) | 75–15 (.833) | | |
Alabama State (SWAC) (2026–present)
| 2026–27 | Alabama State | 2–3 | 0–0 | | |
| Alabama State: | | 2–3 (.400) | 0–0 (–) | | |
| Total: | | 334–124 (.729) | | | |
National champion Postseason invitational champion Conference regular season champion Conference regular season and conference tournament champion Division regular season champion Division regular season and conference tournament champion Conference tournament champion
