= Andrew Hayles =

American basketball player

Personal information
- Born: March 4, 1987 (age 39) Mobile, Alabama, U.S.
- Listed height: 6 ft 5 in (1.96 m)
- Listed weight: 195 lb (88 kg)

Career information
- High school: LeFlore (Mobile, Alabama)
- College: Alabama State (2005–2009)
- NBA draft: 2009: undrafted
- Playing career: 2009–2017
- Position: Shooting guard

Career history
- 2009–2010: AD Torreforta
- 2013–2014: Montgomery Blackhawks

Career highlights
- AP Honorable mention All-American (2008); SWAC Player of the Year (2008); First-team All-SWAC (2008); Second-team All-SWAC (2009); SWAC tournament MVP (2009); SWAC Freshman of the Year (2006)

Andrew Hayles (born March 4, 1987) is an American former professional basketball player. He played college basketball for the Alabama State Hornets before playing professionally in Spain and in the American Basketball Association (ABA)

Hayles is from Mobile, Alabama. He attended LeFlore Magnet High School where he was a standout basketball player, which eventually landed him a scholarship to play for Alabama State University. During his college career, which spanned between 2005–06 and 2008–09, he led the Southwestern Athletic Conference (SWAC) in numerous statistical categories. As a junior, he was first in effective field goal percentage (.545) and turnover percentage (10.5%). For his solid season, Hayles was named the Southwestern Athletic Conference Men's Basketball Player of the Year in 2007–08. As a senior, Hayles led the SWAC in made three-point field goals (70) and attempts (189). Also during his senior year he scored 13.7 points per game, which was good for eighth in the league, as he led the Hornets to a berth in the 2009 NCAA tournament where they lost in the first round.

Following his time at Alabama State, Hayles played in Spain during the 2009–10 season for AD Torreforta of the LEB Plata, where he averaged 10 points per game. His next playing stint came during the 2013–14 season with the Montgomery Blackhawks of the ABA, where he averaged 28 points per game. In November 2017, he spent preseason with the Windsor Express of the National Basketball League of Canada.
