= Tony Harvey (basketball) =

American basketball coach

Biographical details
- Born: South Bend, Indiana, U.S.

Playing career
- 1986–1988: Cameron

Coaching career (HC unless noted)
- 1989–1992: Benton Harbor HS (assistant)
- 1992–1994: Southern (assistant)
- 1994–1996: McNeese State (assistant)
- 1996: Compton (associate HC)
- 1996–1999: Eastern Michigan (assistant)
- 1999–2004: Missouri (associate HC)
- 2008–2012: Texas Southern
- 2017–2020: UIC (assistant)
- 2020–2021: Eastern Michigan (assistant)
- 2023–2024: DePaul (assistant)

Head coaching record
- Overall: 58–72 (.446)
- Tournaments: 0–1 (NIT)

Accomplishments and honors

Awards
- SWAC Coach of the Year (2011)

Tony Harvey is an American basketball coach who was most recently an assistant coach for the DePaul Blue Demons men's basketball team. He served as the head coach of the Texas Southern Tigers from 2008 to 2012.

== Early life ==
Born in South Bend, Indiana, Harvey was raised in Benton Harbor, Michigan, and graduated from Benton Harbor High School in 1983. He attended Louisiana Tech University for one year before he earned an associate degree from the North Dakota State College of Science, where he also played on the basketball team. Harvey completed the final two years of his college career at Cameron University, where he was an all-conference player and graduated in 1988.

== Coaching career ==
Harvey began his coaching career as an assistant coach at his alma mater Benton Harbor High School from 1989 to 1992. He served as an assistant coach for the Southern Jaguars from 1992 to 1994, and the McNeese State Cowboys from 1994 to 1996. Harvey had a short stint as the associate head coach at Compton College in 1996 before he was appointed as an assistant coach for the Eastern Michigan Eagles from 1996 to 1999. He was influential in the development of future National Basketball Association (NBA) players Earl Boykins and Derrick Dial while in that role. On April 14, 1999, Harvey joined the Missouri Tigers as the first assistant coach to join Quin Snyder's staff. He established a system that helped the Missouri Tigers produce some of the top ranked recruitment classes nationally. He left the Missouri Tigers in 2004 amidst allegations of NCAA rules violations that he was later cleared of by an NCAA committee. After his departure from Missouri, Harvey worked as a basketball director for MAC Sports and Entertainment and operated clinics.

On April 13, 2008, Harvey was appointed head coach of the Texas Southern Tigers. He led the team to a 7–25 record during his first season but improved to 17–16 and a second-place finish in the Southwestern Athletic Conference (SWAC) tournament the following season. The Texas Southern Tigers achieved a 19–13 record during the 2010–11 season, won the SWAC tournament, and earned a bid to the 2011 National Invitation Tournament as their first postseason appearance since 2003; Harvey was named as the SWAC Coach of the Year. The Tigers went 15–18 and lost to the Mississippi Valley State Delta Devils in the SWAC title game. On July 2, 2012, Harvey resigned as head coach of the Texas Southern Tigers. He achieved a 58–72 record during his tenure.

On September 5, 2017, Harvey joined the UIC Flames men's basketball team as an assistant coach. On September 1, 2020, Harvey returned to the Eastern Michigan Eagles as an assistant coach.

On July 24, 2023, Harvey was named as an assistant coach for the DePaul Blue Demons.

== Personal life ==
Harvey is the son of Lou Harvey, who served as a coach of the girls' basketball team at Benton Harbor High School.

== Head coaching record ==
Record table
Season	Team	Overall	Conference	Standing	Postseason
Texas Southern Tigers (Southwestern Athletic Conference) (2008–2012)
2008–09	Texas Southern	7–25	7–11	T–7th	
2009–10	Texas Southern	17–16	11–7	5th	
2010–11	Texas Southern	19–13	16–2	1st	NIT First Round
2011–12	Texas Southern	15–18	12–6	3rd	
Texas Southern:		58–72 (.446)	46–26 (.639)		
Total:		58–72 (.446)			
National champion Postseason invitational champion Conference regular season champion Conference regular season and conference tournament champion Division regular season champion Division regular season and conference tournament champion Conference tournament champion
