= Paul Covington =

American basketball coach (1934–2020)

Biographical details
- Born: July 26, 1934; Richmond, Kentucky, U.S.
- Died: November 22, 2020 (aged 86)

Playing career
- 1952–1956: Jackson State

Coaching career (HC unless noted)
- 1958–1962: Higgins HS
- 1962–1964: Coahoma CC
- 1964–1967: Jackson State (assistant)
- 1967–1986: Jackson State

Administrative career (AD unless noted)
- 1986–1995: Jackson State (assistant AD)
- 1995–1999: Jackson State

Head coaching record
- Overall: 338–195

Accomplishments and honors

Championships
- 5 SWAC regular season (1968, 1970, 1974, 1975, 1982); SWAC tournament (1978)

Paul Edward Covington (July 26, 1934 – November 22, 2020) was an American college basketball coach. He was the head coach of the Jackson State Tigers from 1967 to 1986.

Covington played three sports at Jackson State – basketball, tennis, and baseball. After his college career was over, he became head basketball coach at Higgins High School in Clarksdale, Mississippi. He then moved to Coahoma Community College for four seasons before returning to his alma mater as an assistant coach in 1964. He became the school's head coach in 1967.

He served as the Tigers' coach for 19 seasons, leading the program from the National Association of Intercollegiate Athletics (NAIA) to NCAA Division I during that time. He left as the school's all-time winningest coach with a record of 338–195.

After his retirement as a basketball coach, Covington became an assistant athletic director for the university. He served as the school's athletic director from 1995 to 1999.

Covington died on November 22, 2020, at age 86, of complications from pneumonia.
