= Robert Washington (basketball) =

American basketball coach (born 1977)

Biographical details
- Born: June 1, 1977 (age 49); Lexington, Kentucky, U.S.
- Education: Eastern Kentucky

Coaching career (HC unless noted)
- 2001–2004: Florida A&M (assistant)
- 2004–2009: Seminole State College of Florida
- 2009–2012: Grambling State

Head coaching record
- Overall: 23–66 (.258)

Robert Washington (born June 1, 1977) is an American former basketball coach. He served as the head coach of the Grambling State Tigers from 2009 to 2012.

== College ==
Washington first attended Paine College, where he played basketball but was hindered by injuries. He eventually graduated from Eastern Kentucky University with a bachelor's degree in juvenile services and corrections. Washington later earned his Master's of Science in criminal justice from Eastern Kentucky as well.

== Coaching career ==
Washington first became an assistant coach for the Florida A&M Rattlers basketball team in 2001, where he coached during the team's NCAA Tournament appearance in 2004. Following that year, Washington was hired as the head coach for the Seminole State College of Florida, where he would coach for five years. At the beginning of the 2008–09 basketball season, Washington was hired as the interim head coach for Grambling State following the removal of the previous head coach, Rick Duckett. Later in the season, Washington was elevated to head coach. Washington would serve in this capacity until the end of a 4-win and academically poor 2011–12 season, upon which he was fired.

== Head coaching record ==
Record table
| Season | Team | Overall | Conference | Standing | Postseason |
|---|---|---|---|---|---|
Grambling State (SWAC) (2009–2012)
| 2009–10 | Grambling State | 7–21 | 4–14 | 8th | |
| 2010–11 | Grambling State | 12–21 | 8–10 | 6th | |
| 2011–12 | Grambling State | 4–24 | 4–14 | 10th | |
| Texas Southern: | | 23–66 (.258) | 16–38 (.296) | | |
| Total: | | 23–66 (.258) | | | |
National champion Postseason invitational champion Conference regular season champion Conference regular season and conference tournament champion Division regular season champion Division regular season and conference tournament champion Conference tournament champion
