= C. J. Aiken =

American basketball player

Free agent
- Position: Power forward

Personal information
- Born: September 27, 1990 (age 35) Conshohocken, Pennsylvania, U.S.
- Listed height: 6 ft 9 in (2.06 m)
- Listed weight: 200 lb (91 kg)

Career information
- High school: Plymouth-Whitemarsh (Plymouth Meeting, Pennsylvania)
- College: Saint Joseph's (2010–2013)
- NBA draft: 2013: undrafted
- Playing career: 2013–present

Career history
- 2013: Erie BayHawks
- 2015–2016: Wilki Morskie Szczecin
- 2017: Bendigo Braves
- 2017: Czarni Słupsk
- 2018: Niagara River Lions
- 2018: Columbian Dyip
- 2018–2019: Tuři Svitavy
- 2019–2020: PVSK Panthers
- 2022: Taoyuan Pauian Archiland
- 2023: Byblos Club
- 2023: Al-Gharafa SC
- 2024-2025: Chun Yu
- 2025: Kinwa Club

Career highlights
- Atlantic 10 Defensive Player of the Year (2012); Atlantic 10 All-Defensive Team (2012)

Charles Justin "C. J." Aiken (born September 27, 1990) is an American professional basketball player. He played college basketball for Saint Joseph's University.

== College career ==
In his three-year college career at Saint Joseph's, Aiken played 98 games (82 starts) while averaging 9.6 points, 5.0 rebounds and 3.3 blocks in 30.2 minutes per game. Over his stint, he was one of the top shot-blockers in the NCAA as he earned Atlantic 10 Defensive Player of the Year honors in 2011–12.

In April 2013, Aiken declared for the NBA draft, forgoing his final year of college eligibility.

== Professional career ==
After going undrafted in the 2013 NBA draft, Aiken joined the Sacramento Kings for the Las Vegas Summer League in July and the team's mini-camp in September.

On November 1, 2013, Aiken was selected by the Texas Legends with the fifth overall pick in the 2013 NBA Development League Draft. Three days later, he was traded to the Erie BayHawks in exchange for Terrel Harris. He managed just six games for the BayHawks in 2013–14 as he averaged 4.7 points and 3.8 rebounds per game.

On January 27, 2015, Aiken was reacquired by the BayHawks. However, he was waived two days later before appearing in a game for them.

On September 7, 2015, Aiken signed with Wilki Morskie Szczecin of the Polish Basketball League.

In March 2017, Aiken signed with Bendigo Braves South East Australian Basketball League (SEABL) club based in Bendigo, Victoria. Aiken averaged 20.2 points, 12.4 rebounds, 2.0 assist, and 1.6 blocks. Aiken won the leagues defensive player of the year. He finished second in the league for rebounds per game with 12.4 per game as well as second overall for boards and third for defensive boards.

In September 2017, Aiken signed with Czarni Słupsk a Polish basketball team, based in Słupsk, playing in Tauron Basket Liga. He averaged 11.7 points, 8.7 rebounds, and 1.3 blocks.

In January 2018, Aiken signed with Niagara River Lions. A Canadian professional basketball team based in St. Catharines, Ontario, that competes in the Canadian Elite Basketball League.

In March 2018, Aiken signed with the Kia Picanto of the Philippine Basketball Association as their import for the 2018 PBA Commissioner's Cup.

In October 2018, Aiken signed with Tuři Svitavy that plays in the top professional Czech basketball league, the NBL.

In July 2019, Aiken signed with PVSK Panthers in the NB I/A.

On July 7, 2020, Aiken signed with Hungarian club Kaposvári KK of the NB I/A. On September 29, 2020, Aiken left the team due to injury.

On January 8, 2022, Aiken signed with Taoyuan Pauian Archiland of the Taiwanese Super Basketball League. At the end of the season, he was named All-Taiwanese Super Basketball League Honorable Mention.

In February 2023, Aiken signed with Al Gharafa in Doha, Qatar of the Qatar Basketball Federation. At the end of the season he was named All-Qatar D1 Second Team.

On May 24, 2025, Aiken received a Hoops Agent Player of the Week Award after having a double-double of 22 points and 13 rebounds while playing with Kinwa Club of Libobasquet.
