= 2013 NBA Development League draft =

General information
- Sport: Basketball
- Date: November 1, 2013
- Location: via Cisco WebEx Meeting Center at 7:00 pm (EDT)

Overview
- League: NBA
- First selection: Grant Jerrett, Tulsa 66ers

The 2013 NBA Development League draft was the 13th draft of the National Basketball Association Development League (NBDL). The draft was held on November 1, 2013, just before the 2013–14 season.

== Key ==
Pos.	G	F	C
Position	Guard	Forward	Center

== Draft ==
=== First round ===
Pick	Team	Player	School
1	Tulsa 66ers	Grant Jerrett	Arizona
2	Rio Grande Valley Vipers	James Johnson	Wake Forest
3	Sioux Falls Skyforce	Quincy Douby	Rutgers
4	Idaho Stampede	Pierre Jackson	Baylor
5	Texas Legends	C.J. Aiken	Saint Joseph's
6	Delaware 87ers	Norvel Pelle	Iona
7	Sioux Falls Skyforce	DeAndre Liggins	Kentucky
8	Erie BayHawks	Reginald Buckner	Mississippi
9	Delaware 87ers	Thanasis Antetokounmpo	Greece
10	Maine Red Claws	Terrance Henry	Mississippi
11	Iowa Energy	William Buford	Ohio State
12	Austin Toros	Kyle Hunt	OK Science and Arts
13	Canton Charge	Bo Spencer	Nebraska
14	Canton Charge	Gilbert Brown	Pittsburgh
15	Santa Cruz Warriors	Scott Suggs	Washington
16	Rio Grande Valley Vipers	Dario Hunt	Nevada
17	Bakersfield Jam	Aaron Johnson	UAB

=== Second round ===
Pick	Team	Player	School
1	Maine Red Claws	Frank Gaines	IPFW
2	Reno Bighorns	Kevin Foster	Fresno State
3	Santa Cruz Warriors	Jonathan Kreft	Florida State
4	Idaho Stampede	Kellen Thornton	Tennessee State
5	Texas Legends	Rashad Anderson	UConn
6	Los Angeles D-Fenders	Josh Magette	UAB Huntsville
7	Erie BayHawks	Ryan Evans	Wisconsin
8	Erie BayHawks	Darren White	Campbell
9	Delaware 87ers	Reggie Johnson	Miami
10	Iowa Energy	Abdul Gaddy	Washington
11	Tulsa 66ers	Chase Tapley	SDSU
12	Austin Toros	Cameron Bennerman	NC State
13	Fort Wayne Mad Ants	Alfred Aboya	UCLA
14	Canton Charge	Zane Johnson	Hawaii
15	Rio Grande Valley Vipers	Tony Bishop	Texas State
16	Rio Grande Valley Vipers	Kevin Parrom	Arizona
17	Bakersfield Jam	Carlos Strong	Boston

=== Third round ===
Pick	Team	Player	School
1	Iowa Energy	Eric Wise	USC
2	Reno Bighorns	Jaquon Parker	Cincinnati
3	Springfield Armor	Marcus Hubbard	Angelo State
4	Santa Cruz Warriors	Shane Gibson	Sacred Heart
5	Sioux Falls Skyforce	A.J. Davis	JMU
6	Tulsa 66ers	Scoop Jardine	Syracuse
7	Austin Toros	Greg Gantt	FAU
8	Iowa Energy	Marcus Johnson	USC
9	Delaware 87ers	Aquille Carr	Princeton Day HS
10	Bakersfield Jam	Markeith Cummings	Kennesaw State
11	Tulsa 66ers	Maurice Sutton	Villanova
12	Austin Toros	Chief Kickingstallionsims	Alabama State
13	Springfield Armor	Paul Sturgess	Mountain State
14	Fort Wayne Mad Ants	Brandon Beasley	William Penn
15	Santa Cruz Warriors	Jeremy Atkinson	UNC Asheville
16	Santa Cruz Warriors	Orion Outerbridge	Rhode Island
17	Bakersfield Jam	Derick Beltran	Southern

=== Fourth round ===
Pick	Team	Player	School
1	Iowa Energy	Jeff Jones	Rider
2	Reno Bighorns	Steven Pledger	Oklahoma
3	Springfield Armor	Joevan Catron	Oregon
4	Idaho Stampede	Tracy Smith	NC State
5	Texas Legends	John Allen	Western Wash.
6	Los Angeles D-Fenders	Muhammad El-Amin	Stony Brook
7	Sioux Falls Skyforce	Jamine Peterson	Providence
8	Erie BayHawks	Mike Moore	Hofstra
9	Delaware 87ers	Nurideen Lindsey	Rider
10	Maine Red Claws	Chehales Tapscott	Portland State
11	Tulsa 66ers	Nick Murphy	Jacksonville State
12	Austin Toros	Keith Chamberlain	Grinell
13	Fort Wayne Mad Ants	Kyle Randall	Central Michigan
14	Tulsa 66ers	Longar Longar	Oklahoma
15	Idaho Stampede	Mohamed Fall	Montana State
16	Rio Grande Valley Vipers	Gary Talton	UIC
17	Bakersfield Jam	Doug Thomas	Iowa

=== Fifth round ===
Pick	Team	Player	School
1	Iowa Energy	Esian Henderson	Central Missouri State
2	Reno Bighorns	BJ Jenkins	Murray State
3	Springfield Armor	Tahj Tate	Delaware State
4	Idaho Stampede	Dion Dixon	Cincinnati
5	Texas Legends	Travis Garrison	Maryland
6	Los Angeles D-Fenders	Kyisean Reed	Utah State
7	Sioux Falls Skyforce	Lewis Jackson	Purdue University
8	Erie BayHawks	Kevin Rogers	Baylor
9	Delaware 87ers	Mfon Udofia	Georgia Tech
10	Maine Red Claws	Brian Barkdoll	NW Nazarene
11	Tulsa 66ers	Robert Crawford	Central Ark.
12	Austin Toros	Michael Sturns	Holy Family
13	Fort Wayne Mad Ants	Salim Stoudamire	Arizona
14	Canton Charge	Lorne Jackson	Pepperdine
15	Santa Cruz Warriors	Earl Pettis	La Salle
16	Rio Grande Valley Vipers	Mike Black	Albany
17	Bakersfield Jam	Jeremy Williams	UTEP

=== Sixth round ===
Pick	Team	Player	School
1	Iowa Energy	DJ Smedley	UIC
2	Reno Bighorns	Chris Telesford	Columbus State
3	Springfield Armor	Quinn McDowell	William and Mary
4	Idaho Stampede	Reggie Hearn	Northwestern
5	Texas Legends	TyShwan Edmondson	Austin Peay
6	Los Angeles D-Fenders	Maurice McNeil	Houston
7	Sioux Falls Skyforce	Phil Jones	UNC Charlotte
8	Erie BayHawks	Ricky Davis	Iowa
9	Delaware 87ers	Stefan Welsh	Arkansas
10	Maine Red Claws	Lester Prosper	Old Westbury
11	Tulsa 66ers	Chad Gillaspy	Evangel
12	Austin Toros	Yan Moukoury	Brewton Parker
13	Fort Wayne Mad Ants	Titus Robinson	Buffalo
14	Canton Charge	Alejo Rodriguez	Iowa
15	Santa Cruz Warriors	Garland Judkins	Texas A&M-CC
16	Rio Grande Valley Vipers	Akeem Ellis	Coppin State
17	Bakersfield Jam	Brandon Fortenberry	SE Louisiana

=== Seventh round ===
Pick	Team	Player	School
1	Springfield Armor	Brian Addison	Buffalo
2	Idaho Stampede	N/A	N/A
3	Los Angeles D-Fenders	Dami Sapara	Ozarks
4	Sioux Falls Skyforce	N/A	N/A
5	Erie BayHawks	Andrae Nelson	Morehouse
6	Delaware 87ers	Darin Mency	Merrimack
7	Maine Red Claws	Paul Crosby	MVSU
8	Austin Toros	Blake Thompson	Prairie View A&M
9	Canton Charge	N/A	N/A
10	Santa Cruz Warriors	Kiwi Gardner	Providence
11	Rio Grande Valley Vipers	Dwayne Lathan	Indiana State
12	Bakersfield Jam	Joshua Lowry	Grand Canyon

=== Eighth round ===
Pick	Team	Player	School
1	Springfield Armor	Bruce Massey	MTSU
2	Los Angeles D-Fenders	N/A	N/A
3	Erie BayHawks	Gabe Rogers	Northern Arizona
4	Delaware 87ers	JR Inman	Rutgers
5	Bakersfield Jam	Ronnie Aguilar	Colorado State
