= Jake Morton =

American basketball coach (born 1969)

Current position
- Title: Head coach
- Team: Alcorn State
- Conference: SWAC
- Record: 9–23 (.281)

Biographical details
- Born: April 21, 1969 (age 57)
- Education: University of Miami (1993)

Playing career
- 1988–1992: Miami (FL)
- Position: Guard

Coaching career (HC unless noted)
- 1999–2000: Ferris State (assistant)
- 2000–2004: Saint Francis (assistant)
- 2004–2007: James Madison (assistant)
- 2007–2011: Miami (FL) (assistant)
- 2011–2013: Western Kentucky (assistant/DBO)
- 2014–2016: Coppin State (assistant)
- 2016–2022: Jacksonville State (assistant)
- 2022–2024: East Carolina (assistant)
- 2024–2025: Florida State (assistant)
- 2025–present: Alcorn State

Head coaching record
- Overall: 9–23 (.281)

Jake Morton (born April 21, 1969) is an American college basketball coach and former player who is the current head coach of the Alcorn State Braves. He has previously coached the Ferris State Bulldogs, Saint Francis Red Flash, James Madison Dukes, Miami Hurricanes, Western Kentucky Hilltoppers, Coppin State Eagles, Jacksonville State Gamecocks, East Carolina Pirates, and Florida State Seminoles.

== Early life ==
Morton attended Gonzaga College High School and later attended the University of Miami on a scholarship, where he played basketball. A guard, he was Miami's second-leading scorer as a sophomore, recording an average of 11.0 points per game while also finishing as the team leader in steals (45). He graduated in 1993 with a bachelor's degree, finishing ninth in school history for 3-point shots made (136) while scoring 909 points, 245 rebounds and 194 assists. He later played professionally for six years in Israel.

== Coaching career ==
Morton began his coaching career at the Five-Star Basketball Camp, later becoming an assistant coach for the Ferris State Bulldogs in 1999. He later was an assistant for the Saint Francis Red Flash from 2000 to 2004, the James Madison Dukes from 2004 to 2007, and the Miami Hurricanes from 2007 to 2011. He then joined the Western Kentucky Hilltoppers and became the director of basketball operations following the 2011–12 season, before resigning in 2013.

Morton worked as an assistant for the Coppin State Eagles from 2014 to 2016 and then joined the Jacksonville State Gamecocks. In his tenure at Jacksonville State, he helped the team average 20 wins per season with a conference title and an NCAA Tournament appearance. He then worked as an assistant for the East Carolina Pirates from 2022 to 2024 before joining the Florida State Seminoles in 2024. After the 2024–25 season, he was named the head coach of the Alcorn State Braves.

== Head coaching record ==
Record table
Season	Team	Overall	Conference	Standing	Postseason
Alcorn State Braves (Southwestern Athletic Conference) (2025–present)
2025–26	Alcorn State	9–23	7–11	T–9th	
Alcorn State:		9–23 (.281)	7–11 (.389)		
Total:		9–23 (.281)			
National champion Postseason invitational champion Conference regular season champion Conference regular season and conference tournament champion Division regular season champion Division regular season and conference tournament champion Conference tournament champion
