= Andy Stoglin =

American basketball coach (1942–2024)

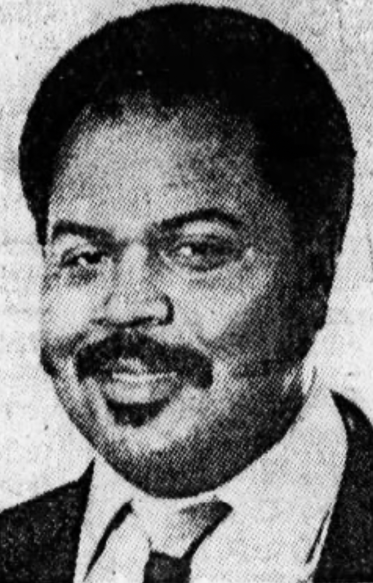
- Stoglin in 1982

Biographical details
- Born: August 16, 1942
- Died: May 6, 2024 (aged 81)

Playing career
- 1961–1963: Stockton
- 1963–1965: Texas Western
- ???-???: Harlem Globetrotters
- Position: Forward

Coaching career (HC unless noted)
- 1982–1984: Southern
- 1989–2003: Jackson State

Head coaching record
- Overall: 229–242

Andy Stoglin (August 16, 1942 – May 6, 2024) was an American basketball coach.

== Life and career ==
Stoglin was born on August 16, 1942. He graduated from Phoenix Union High School in 1959. He played for the Harlem Globetrotters for three years.

Stoglin was an assistant coach and recruiting coordinator at Tulsa University for two years. In 1982, he became head coach for the Southern Jaguars basketball team. On July 17, 1984, he resigned from his head coaching position to become recruiting coordinator at Oklahoma State University, replacing John Gray.

In 1989, Stoglin was hired as head coach for the Jackson State Tigers basketball team, replacing John Prince. In 2003, he left his head coaching position.

Stoglin died on May 6, 2024, at the age of 81.
