= Lewis Jackson (basketball, born 1962) =

American basketball player-coach (born 1962)

Biographical details
- Born: August 13, 1962 (age 64); Wetumpka, Alabama, U.S.

Playing career
- 1980–1984: Alabama State
- Position: Small forward

Coaching career (HC unless noted)
- 2000–2005: Alabama State (assistant)
- 2005–2020: Alabama State

Head coaching record
- Overall: 207–262 (.441)
- Tournaments: 0–2 (NCAA Division I); 0–1 (NIT); 0–1 (CIT)

Accomplishments and honors

Championships
- 2 SWAC regular season (2008, 2009); 2 SWAC tournament (2009, 2011)

Awards
- SWAC Player of the Year (1984); SWAC Coach of the Year (2009)

Lewis Jackson (born August 13, 1962) is the former men's college basketball head coach at Alabama State University. He took over as head coach in 2005, after Rob Spivery departed to take the head coach's job at Southern University. Jackson resigned from ASU on March 27, 2020, after 15 seasons.

Prior to becoming the head coach at Alabama State, Jackson was an assistant coach for five years on Spivery's staff.

Jackson also played basketball at Alabama State, currently sitting fourth on Alabama State's all-time scoring list, and was named SWAC Player of the Year in his senior year. Jackson was inducted into both the Alabama State and SWAC Hall of Fames, and his number was retired by both Alabama State and his high school, Wetumpka High School.

During his high school career at Wetumpka High School, Jackson led the Indians to consecutive state championships in 1979 and 1980. The 1980 championship team defeated a Leeds squad led by future NBA Hall of Famer Charles Barkley 74-66.

Jackson played one year of professional basketball in Australia for the Illawarra Hawks. Jackson was the recipient of the 2009 SWAC Coach of the Year award.

Jackson is married to retired Alabama State Lady Hornets coach Freda Freeman-Jackson and their daughter Bianca currently plays for Florida State.

== Head coaching record ==
Record table
| Season | Team | Overall | Conference | Standing | Postseason |
|---|---|---|---|---|---|
Alabama State Hornets (Southwestern Athletic Conference) (2005–2020)
| 2005–06 | Alabama State | 12–18 | 10–8 | T–4th | |
| 2006–07 | Alabama State | 10–20 | 8–10 | 8th | |
| 2007–08 | Alabama State | 20–11 | 15–3 | 1st | NIT First Round |
| 2008–09 | Alabama State | 22–10 | 16–2 | 1st | NCAA Division I Opening Round |
| 2009–10 | Alabama State | 16–15 | 12–6 | 3rd | |
| 2010–11 | Alabama State | 17–18 | 11–7 | 4th | NCAA Division I First Four |
| 2011–12 | Alabama State | 12–19 | 9–9 | T–5th | |
| 2012–13 | Alabama State | 10–22 | 8–10 | T–5th | |
| 2013–14 | Alabama State | 19–13 | 12–6 | T–2nd | CIT First Round |
| 2014–15 | Alabama State | 19–10 | 14–4 | 2nd | |
| 2015–16 | Alabama State | 14–17 | 9–9 | 5th | |
| 2016–17 | Alabama State | 8–23 | 6–12 | T–8th | |
| 2017–18 | Alabama State | 8–23 | 8–10 | 7th | |
| 2018–19 | Alabama State | 12–19 | 9–9 | 6th | |
| 2019–20 | Alabama State | 8–24 | 7–11 | 7th | |
| Alabama State: | | 207–262 (.441) | 154–116 (.570) | | |
| Total: | | 207–262 (.441) | | | |
National champion Postseason invitational champion Conference regular season champion Conference regular season and conference tournament champion Division regular season champion Division regular season and conference tournament champion Conference tournament champion
