= Sean Woods =

American basketball coach (born 1970)

Current position
- Title: Head coach
- Team: Scott County HS (KY)

Biographical details
- Born: March 29, 1970 (age 56); East Chicago, Indiana, U.S.

Playing career
- 1988–1992: Kentucky

Coaching career (HC unless noted)
- 2003–2005: High Point (asst.)
- 2005–2006: Texas A&M Corpus Christi (asst.)
- 2006–2008: TCU (asst.)
- 2008–2012: Mississippi Valley St.
- 2012–2016: Morehead State
- 2017–2018: Stetson (asst.)
- 2018–2023: Southern
- 2025–present: Scott County HS (KY)

Head coaching record
- Overall: 191–232 (.452)

Accomplishments and honors

Championships
- SWAC regular season (2012); SWAC tournament (2012)

Awards
- SWAC Coach of the Year (2012); Ben Jobe Award (2012)

Sean Woods (born March 29, 1970) is an American former basketball player and former head coach for the Southern Jaguars basketball team.

== Playing career ==
Woods attended Cathedral High School in Indianapolis before playing college basketball at the University of Kentucky. As a Wildcat in 1992, he was a member of a senior-laden team colloquially known as the "Unforgettables" who had come to Kentucky in 1988 and had stayed with the school for all four years, despite the NCAA putting the university's basketball program on probation for three years, including a ban on post-season competition in both 1990 and 1991, for recruiting and academic violations in 1989.

The Unforgettables were coached by Rick Pitino and included fellow seniors Richie Farmer, Deron Feldhaus, and John Pelphrey. The team surprised many by garnering a number 2 seed and reaching the Elite Eight in the 1992 NCAA tournament. Woods and the Wildcats defeated Old Dominion, Iowa State, and the University of Massachusetts en route to the regional final. With a 29–6 record, the Wildcats faced off against Duke at the Spectrum in Philadelphia with a trip to the Final Four on the line.

In the finals against Duke, Woods cemented a legendary status in Kentucky lore by scoring 21 points, including a 10-foot (3.0 m) floater over Christian Laettner in overtime. The basket gave Kentucky a 103–102 lead with 2.1 seconds remaining. However, the Unforgettables lost the game on Laettner's subsequent jumper as time expired.

After Woods graduated, he was added to the NBA's Indiana Pacers preseason roster but did not make the team.

== Coaching career ==
He then ran a popular basketball camp, which polished future basketball players such as Tony Delk and Antoine Walker (both of whom had played at Kentucky). He was an assistant coach at High Point University before he moved to Texas A&M-Corpus Christi, also as an assistant.

In 2005, Woods became a charter member of the Kentucky Athletic Hall of Fame as part of the Unforgettables. Immediately following the Duke loss, every Kentucky senior's jersey (though not their numbers) was retired. Woods is currently fifth all-time on Kentucky's career assist list, with 482.

On June 24, 2008, Woods became the head coach of the Mississippi Valley State University men's basketball team. In 2012, Woods's last year there, the Delta Devils won the Southwestern Athletic Conference regular season and conference tournament, qualifying for the NCAA Tournament. The team lost in the First Four round. Woods was chosen as the 2012 winner of the Ben Jobe Award, given annually to the most outstanding minority men's college basketball head coach in NCAA Division I competition.

On May 14, 2012, Woods was announced as head coach at Morehead State University, taking over for Donnie Tyndall.

On November 22, 2016, Woods was suspended as head coach as result of an investigation into player mistreatment. He was subsequently charged with misdemeanor battery after two players accused him of assaulting them during a game, and a player's father claimed to ESPN that Woods head-butted his son. Assistant coach Preston Spradlin was named interim head coach during the investigation.

On December 15, two days after Woods was charged with misdemeanor battery in Indiana for allegedly assaulting two of his players during a game versus Evansville, it was announced that Woods had resigned. Spradlin would continue as interim coach while the school conducted a nationwide search for a replacement.

On June 9, 2017, Woods was hired by Stetson University as an assistant coach for the men's basketball team. He stayed on the Hatters' staff for one season before being named the 12th head coach in Southern University history on April 12, 2018. He replaced Morris Scott who served as interim head coach for the 2017–18 season.

On April 21, 2025, it was announced that Sean Woods would become the new head coach for Scott County High School in Georgetown, Kentucky. He replaced head coach Steve Helton after his first year.

== Head coaching record ==
Record table
Season	Team	Overall	Conference	Standing	Postseason
Mississippi Valley State Delta Devils (Southwestern Athletic Conference) (2008–2012)
2008–09	Mississippi Valley State	7–25	7–11	6th	
2009–10	Mississippi Valley State	9–23	8–10	7th	
2010–11	Mississippi Valley State	13–19	12–6	3rd	
2011–12	Mississippi Valley State	21–13	17–1	1st	NCAA Division I First Four
Mississippi Valley State:		50–80 (.385)	44–28 (.611)		
Morehead State Eagles (Ohio Valley Conference) (2012–2016)
2012–13	Morehead State	15–18	8–8	T–4th (East)	
2013–14	Morehead State	20–14	10–6	3rd (East)	CBI First Round
2014–15	Morehead State	17–17	10–6	3rd (East)	
2015–16	Morehead State	23–14	11–5	2nd (East)	CBI Runner-Up
2016–17	Morehead State	2–7	0–0	Resigned	
Morehead State:		77–70 (.524)	39–26 (.600)		
Southern Jaguars (Southwestern Athletic Conference) (2018–2023)
2018–19	Southern	7–25	6–12	T–7th	
2019–20	Southern	17–15	13–5	2nd	
2020–21	Southern	8–11	8–6	5th	
2021–22	Southern	17–14	12–6	3rd	
2022–23	Southern	15–17	11–7	4st	
Southern:		64–82 (.438)	50–36 (.581)		
Total:		191–232 (.452)			
National champion Postseason invitational champion Conference regular season champion Conference regular season and conference tournament champion Division regular season champion Division regular season and conference tournament champion Conference tournament champion

== Personal life ==
Woods is married and has two children. His son, Martiese Morones, a high school point guard in Kentucky, was signed by TCU for the 2006–07 season. Woods joined the TCU staff shortly afterwards.
