= Kevin Burwell =

American basketball player

Personal information
- Born: January 25, 1989 (age 37) Philadelphia, Pennsylvania
- Listed height: 5 ft 10 in (1.78 m)
- Listed weight: 185 lb (84 kg)

Career information
- High school: Imhotep (Philadelphia, Pennsylvania)
- College: Maryland Eastern Shore (2007–2008); Mississippi Valley State (2008–2012)
- NBA draft: 2012: undrafted
- Playing career: 2011–present
- Position: Point guard
- Number: 25

Career history
- 2011–2012: CB Sant Josep
- 2013: Orangeville A's
- 2013–2014: Springfield Armor
- 2014–2015: New Jersey Thunder
- 2015–2016: KB Peja

Kevin Burwell (born 25 January 1989) is an American professional basketball player who plays for KB Peja of the Kosovo Basketball Superleague. He played most recently for the New Jersey Thunder (APBL) in the U.S. He helped them to win the league title. He was voted to the USBasket.com All-APBL First Team.

== Personal ==
Burwell was born and raised in Philadelphia, Pennsylvania, in Germantown. He is the son of Kevin Burwell, Sr., and Renee Tarpley. Throughout his childhood, Burwell participated in a variety of sports each season, playing basketball on a team for the first time at age six. Burwell graduated from Imhotep Charter School in 2006 playing both basketball and football. Burwell then attended Mississippi Valley State University, becoming one of the top point guards of the 2011–2012 NCAA Division I season. In 2012, Burwell went undrafted in the 2012 NBA draft, making him an unrestricted free agent. As of 2015, Burwell plays for KB Peja, a professional basketball club in Kosovo.

His hobbies outside of basketball are shopping and fixing cars.
