= Alabama State Hornets basketball =

2026–27 Alabama State Hornets basketball team
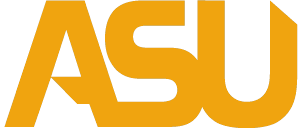
- University: Alabama State University
- First season: 1934
- Athletic director: Jason Cable
- Head coach: Chris Wright (1st season)
- Location: Montgomery, Alabama
- Arena: Dunn–Oliver Acadome (capacity: 7,400)
- Conference: SWAC
- Nickname: Hornets
- Colors: Black and old gold

NCAA Division I tournament record
- 1–5

NCAA Division I tournament appearances
- 1972*, 1975*, 2001, 2004, 2009, 2011, 2025

Conference tournament champions
- SIAC: 1935, 1936, 1971, 1972; SWAC: 2001, 2004, 2009, 2011, 2025

Conference regular-season champions
- 2001, 2008, 2009
- * at Division II level

The Alabama State Hornets basketball team is the men's basketball team that represents Alabama State University. The school competes in the Southwestern Athletic Conference (SWAC) in Division I of the National Collegiate Athletic Association (NCAA). They are currently led by first-year head coach Chris Wright and play home games at the Dunn–Oliver Acadome in Montgomery, Alabama. The Hornets have appeared five times in the NCAA Division I men's basketball tournament, most recently in 2025. Alabama State has one win all-time at the NCAA tournament, defeating Saint Francis in the First Four at the 2025 NCAA tournament.

== Postseason results ==
=== NCAA Division I ===
The Hornets have appeared in the NCAA tournament five times. Their record is 1–5.

Year	Seed	Round	Opponent	Result
2001	#16	First Round	#1 Michigan State	L 35–69
2004	#16	First Round	#1 Duke	L 61–96
2009	#16	Opening Round	#16 Morehead State	L 43–58
2011	#16	First Four	#16 UTSA	L 61–70
2025	#16	First Four; First Round	#16 Saint Francis #1 Auburn	W 70–68; L 63–83

=== NCAA Division II ===
The Hornets appeared in the NCAA Division II tournament twice. Their record was 0–3.

Year	Round	Opponent	Result
1972	Round of 36	LSU–New Orleans	L 72–80
1975	Round of 32; Regional Third Place	Chattanooga; Armstrong Atlantic	L 83–107; L 78–110

=== NIT results ===
The Hornets have appeared in the National Invitation Tournament (NIT) two times. Their record is 0–2.

Year	Round	Opponent	Result
1983	First Round	Mississippi	L 75–87
2008	First Round	Arizona State	L 53–64

=== CIT results ===
The Hornets have appeared in one CollegeInsider.com Postseason Tournament (CIT). Their record is 0–1.

Year	Round	Opponent	Result
2014	First Round	Sam Houston State	L 49–71

== Notable players ==
- Lewis Jackson, forward 1980–1984, #33 Jersey Retired, SWAC Hall Of Fame
- Steve Rogers, forward 1989–1992, NBA draft 1992 / Round: 2 / Pick: 40th overall
- Tauheed Epps, forward 1996–1997, more commonly by the stage name 2 Chainz
