= Prairie View A&M Panthers basketball =

Prairie View A&M Panthers
| 2026–27 Prairie View A&M Panthers basketball team |
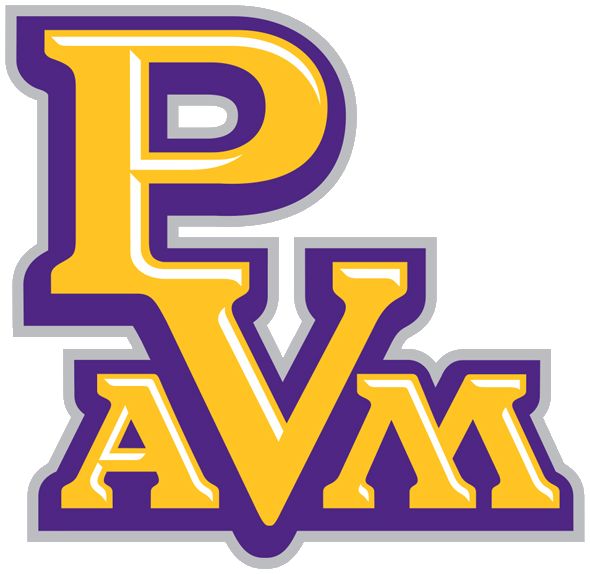
- University: Prairie View A&M University
- Head coach: Byron Smith (11th season)
- Location: Prairie View, Texas
- Arena: William J. Nicks Building (capacity: 6,500)
- Conference: SWAC
- Nickname: Panthers
- Colors: Purple and gold

NCAA Division I tournament appearances
- 1998, 2019, 2026

Conference tournament champions
- 1998, 2019, 2026

Conference regular-season champions
- 1961, 1962, 2003, 2019, 2020, 2021

Uniforms
| Home | Away |

The Prairie View A&M Panthers basketball team is the men's basketball team that represents Prairie View A&M University in Prairie View, Texas, United States. The school's team currently competes in the Southwestern Athletic Conference (SWAC). PVAMU won the 1962 NAIA Tournament. The Panthers have appeared three times in the NCAA Division I men's basketball tournament, most recently in 2026.

== TSU basketball rivalry ==
The Prairie View A&M-Texas Southern basketball rivalry is the most anticipated and highest attended basketball series in the SWAC. The February 2018 match up at Prairie View A&M saw a home crowd of approximately 4,000 which was the largest for the season.

== History ==
Prairie View A&M first joined the NCAA Division I level of college basketball in 1980 as members of the Southwest Athletic Conference (SWAC).

The 1997–98 Panthers team went 13–17 but earned the program's first NCAA tournament appearance. After a 10–16 record in the regular season, Prairie View A&M won three straight games in the SWAC tournament and beat Texas Southern 59–57 to win the 1998 SWAC tournament title. In the 1998 NCAA tournament the Panthers lost the 1st round to Kansas 110–52.

After a 21 year tournament absence, the Panthers returned to the NCAA tournament in 2019. Earning a 22–13 record and 17–1 conference record, Prairie View A&M won the SWAC regular season and tournament titles. Defeating Texas Southern 92–86 in the SWAC title game. They lost to FDU in the NCAA First Four 82–76 in Dayton, Ohio.

In 2026, the Panthers made the program's third NCAA tournament appearance. Prairie View A&M finished the regular season with a 14–17 record but reeled off four straight SWAC tournament wins and a 72–66 win over Southern in the title game to earn the conference's automatic bid. They entered the tournament 18–17 overall. The Panthers defeated Lehigh in the NCAA First Four and won their first tournament game in program history.

== Postseason results ==
=== NCAA Division I ===
The Panthers have appeared three times in the NCAA tournament. Their record is 1–3.

| Year | Seed | Round | Opponent | Result |
|---|---|---|---|---|
| 1998 | #16 | First Round | #1 Kansas | L 52–110 |
| 2019 | #16 | First Four | #16 Fairleigh Dickinson | L 76–82 |
| 2026 | #16 | First Four; First Round | #16 Lehigh #1 Florida | W 67–55; L 55–114 |

=== NCAA Division II ===
The Panthers appeared twice in the NCAA Division II men's basketball tournament. Their record was 2–2.

| Year | Round | Opponent | Result |
|---|---|---|---|
| 1960 | Regional Semifinals; Regional Finals | South Dakota State; Cornell (IA) | W 78–65; L 79–93 |
| 1961 | Regional Semifinals; Regional Finals | Wisconsin–Superior; South Dakota State | W 79–68; L 84–88 |

=== NAIA Tournament results ===
The Panthers have appeared in one NAIA Tournament in which they were National Champions with a 5–0 record in 1962.

| Year | Seed | Round | Opponent | Result |
|---|---|---|---|---|
| 1962 | #2 | First Round; Second Round; Elite Eight; National Semifinals; National Championship | Ashland (OR); Morris Harvey; Arizona State; Western Illinois; Westminster | W 73–64^{OT} W 85–70; W 86–48; W 80–68; W 62–53 |

=== SWAC Tournament ===
The Prairie View A&M Panthers have won the SWAC Tournament in 1998, 2019, and 2026. The team has made several championship game appearances.

== Hall of Famers ==
Prairie View A&M has a professional basketball hall of famer in their ranks. Former Panther center Zelmo Beaty. Beaty, was selected to be inducted into the 2014 National Collegiate Basketball Hall of Fame class and the 2016 Naismith Memorial Basketball Hall of Fame class.

"Zelmo Beaty played for Coach John Payton at Woodville's Scott High School and won back to back Prairie View Interscholastic League 1A state championships in 1957 & 1958. From 1958 to 1962 at Prairie View A&M Beaty averaged 25 points and 20 rebounds per game and was a two-time first team NAIA All-American (1960 & 1962). The "Big Z" led Prairie View A&M to the NAIA national basketball title in 1962 and was named the Chuck Taylor Tournament MVP. He was picked third overall by the St. Louis Hawks in the 1962 NBA Draft. A 6'9" center who was known for his tough, hard-nosed play he averaged 17.4 points and 11.2 rebounds in 7 seasons (1962-1969) for the St. Louis Hawks. He made the NBA All-Rookie first team and 2 All-Star Games before switching to the rival ABA's Utah Stars in 1970. Beaty led the Stars to the 1971 ABA title while averaging 22.9 points and 15.7 rebounds, and was named MVP of the playoffs. In Utah he averaged 19.1 points, 11.6 rebounds and was 3-time All-Star in 4 seasons (1970-1974). He played his final NBA season with the Los Angeles Lakers in 1975. Beaty scored 15,207 points and had 9,665 rebounds during his 12-season professional career. He was named to the ABA's 30-man all-time team in 1997 and was inducted into the National Collegiate Basketball Hall of Fame 2014. Beaty died on August 27, 2013."
