= Jackson State Tigers basketball =

2026–27 Jackson State Tigers basketball team
- University: Jackson State University
- Head coach: Trey Johnson (1st season)
- Location: Jackson, Mississippi
- Arena: Williams Assembly Center (capacity: 8,000)
- Conference: SWAC
- Nickname: Tigers
- Colors: Navy blue, white, and light blue

NCAA Division I tournament appearances
- 1957*, 1964*, 1965*, 1966*, 1968*, 1997, 2000, 2007

Conference tournament champions
- 1978, 1991, 1997, 2000, 2007

Conference regular-season champions
- 1964, 1968, 1970, 1974, 1975, 1982, 1991, 1993, 1996, 2010, 2021

Uniforms
Home	Away
- * at Division II level

The Jackson State Tigers basketball team is the men's basketball team that represents Jackson State University in Jackson, Mississippi, United States. The team competes in the Southwestern Athletic Conference. The team last played in the NCAA Division I men's basketball tournament in 2007. The Tigers are coached by Trey Johnson.

== Conference Championships ==
The Tigers have appeared in the NCAA Division I Tournament three times, and the NCAA Division II Tournament five times. They are the only team to ever forfeit a game in Division II tournament history. The Tigers were the first team to win the SWAC Tournament, in 1978. Due to not having an automatic bid, the Tigers did not go to the Division I tournament in 1978 or 1991, the last time the SWAC has not sent a team to the tournament.

Year	Championship	Coach
1952–53	Midwest Athletic Association Champions	Harrison Wilson
1956–57	Midwest Athletic Association Champions	Harrison Wilson
1963–64	SWAC regular season champions	Harrison Wilson
1967–68	SWAC regular season champions	Paul Covington
1969–70	SWAC regular season champions	Paul Covington
1973–74	SWAC regular season champions	Paul Covington
1974–75	SWAC regular season champions	Paul Covington
1978	SWAC tournament champions	Paul Covington
1981–82	SWAC regular season champions	Paul Covington
1990–91	SWAC regular season champions	Andy Stoglin
1991	SWAC tournament champions	Andy Stoglin
1992–93	SWAC regular season champions	Andy Stoglin
1995–96	SWAC regular season champions	Andy Stoglin
1997	SWAC tournament champions	Andy Stoglin
2000	SWAC tournament champions	Andy Stoglin
2007	SWAC tournament champions	Tevester Anderson
2009–10	SWAC regular season champions	Tevester Anderson
2020–21	SWAC Regular Season Co–Champions	Wayne Brent

== Postseason results ==
=== NCAA Division I tournament results ===
The Tigers have appeared in the NCAA Division I Tournament three times. Their combined record is 0–3. Of the SWAC teams who have appeared in the Division I tournament, they are the only team to have never played an opening round game.

Year	Seed	Round	Opponent	Result
1997	16	First round	Kansas	L 64–78
2000	16	First round	Arizona	L 47–71
2007	16	First round	Florida	L 69–112

=== NCAA Division II tournament results ===
The Tigers have appeared in the NCAA Division II Tournament five times. Their combined record is 4–6. They are the only team to ever forfeit a game in tournament history.

Year	Round	Opponent	Result
1957	Regional semifinals Regional Finals	Philander Smith; South Dakota	W 93–65; L 0–2 †
1964	Regional semifinals Regional 3rd-place game	Evansville; Ball State	L 69–97; L 71–92
1965	Regional semifinals Regional 3rd-place game	Central Michigan; Concordia (IL)	L 79–83; W 90–80
1966	Regional semifinals Regional 3rd-place game	Abilene Christian; Arkansas State	L 79–94; W 77–84
1968	Regional semifinals Regional 3rd-place game	Texas–Pan American; McNeese State	L 73–96; W 75–71

† - Jackson State, citing policy of the Mississippi Board of Trustees, was compelled to withdraw from the tournament rather than competing in an interracial contest. This would be the only time such an occurrence would directly mar the tournament, and Jackson State themselves would return to the tournament in 1964.

=== NIT results ===
The Tigers have appeared in two National Invitation Tournaments (NIT). Their combined record is 1–2.

Year	Round	Opponent	Result
1993	First round Second Round	Connecticut; SW Missouri State	W 90–88; L 52–70
2010	First round	Mississippi State	L 67–81

=== CIT results ===
The Tigers have played in one CollegeInsider.com Postseason Tournament (CIT). Their record is 1–1.

Year	Round	Opponent	Result
2016	First round Second Round	Sam Houston State; Grand Canyon	W 81–77^{OT} L 54–64

== Tigers in the NBA ==
- Cleveland Buckner
- A. W. Holt
- Lindsey Hunter
- McCoy Ingram
- Ryan Lorthridge
- Ed Manning
- Audie Norris
- Sylvester Norris
- Gene Short
- Purvis Short
- Henry Ward
- Cornell Warner
- Dwayne Whitfield
- Trey Johnson
