= Alcorn State Braves basketball =

Alcorn State Braves
2026–27 Alcorn State Braves basketball team
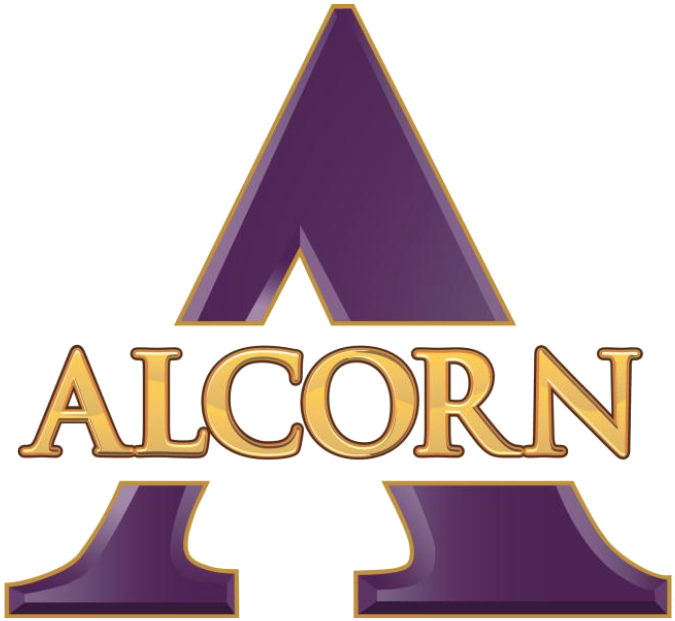
- University: Alcorn State University
- Head coach: Jake Morton (2nd season)
- Location: Lorman, Mississippi
- Arena: Davey Whitney Complex (capacity: 7,000)
- Conference: SWAC
- Nickname: Braves
- Colors: Purple and gold

NCAA Division I tournament Sweet Sixteen
- 1969*

NCAA Division I tournament appearances
- 1969*, 1980, 1982, 1983, 1984, 1999, 2002

Conference tournament champions
- 1979, 1980, 1982, 1983, 1984, 1999, 2002

Conference regular-season champions
- 1966, 1967, 1968, 1969, 1973, 1976, 1979, 1980, 1981, 1982, 1984, 1985, 1986, 1999, 2000, 2002, 2022, 2023
- * at Division II level

The Alcorn State Braves basketball team is the men's basketball team that represents Alcorn State University in Lorman, Mississippi, United States. The Braves compete in the Southwestern Athletic Conference and are led by head coach Jake Morton.

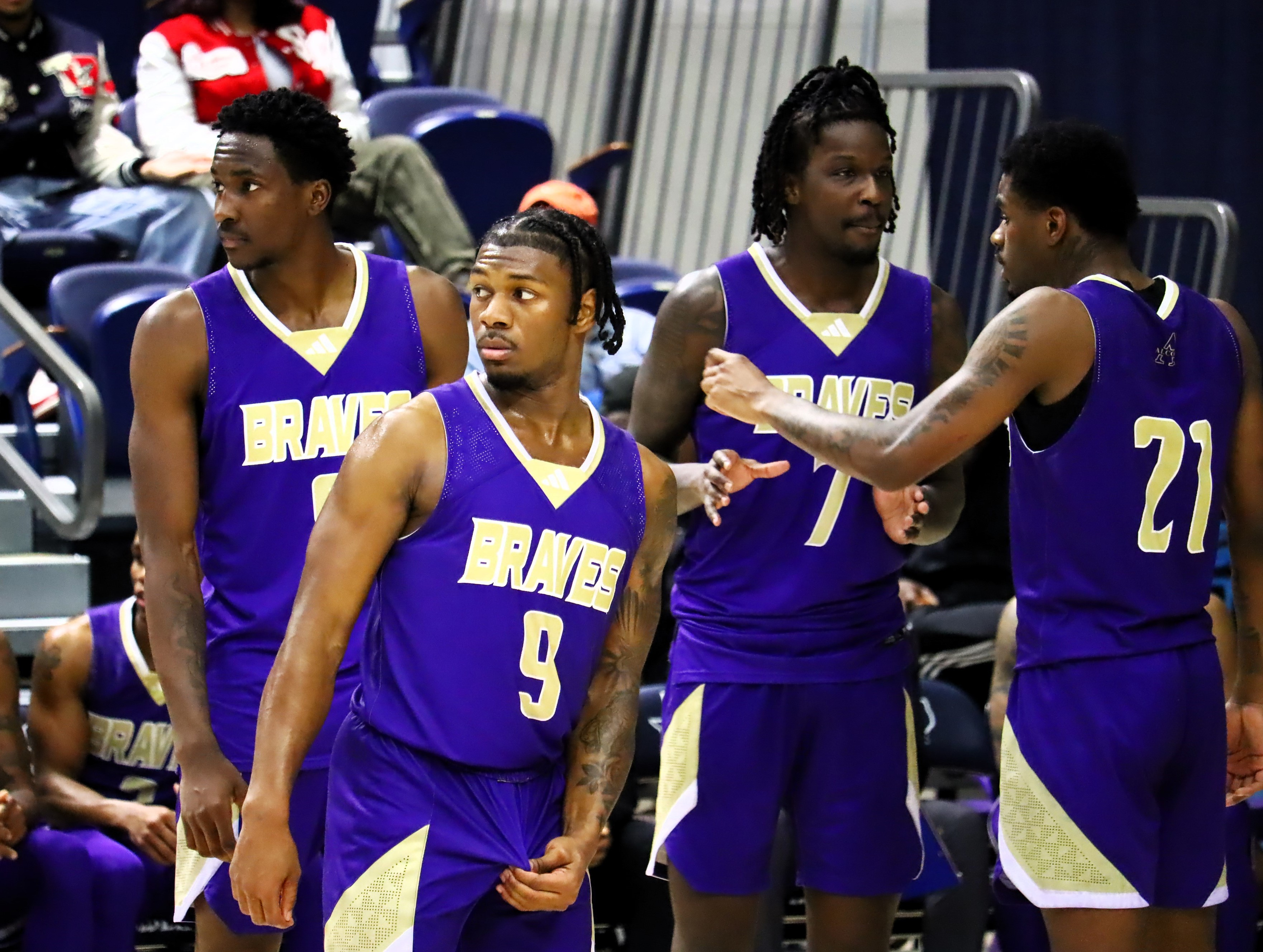
Braves basketball players during a game at Tudor Fieldhouse in 2024

== Postseason results ==
=== NCAA Division I ===
The Braves have appeared in the NCAA tournament six times. The Braves rank third in the SWAC for most NCAA appearances. Their record is 3–6, with their three wins being tied with Texas Southern for the most of any SWAC team. They are the only SWAC team to receive a top ten seed in the tournament (in 1980, the SWAC's first year in the tournament), and one of two (along with Southern) to advance to the regional quarterfinals (the round of 32).

Year	Seed	Round	Opponent	Result
1980	#8	First Round; Second Round	#9 South Alabama #1 LSU	W 70–62; L 88–98
1982	#11	First Round	#6 Houston	L 84–94
1983	#12	Preliminary Round; First Round	#12 Xavier #5 Georgetown	W 81–75; L 63–68
1984	#12	Preliminary Round; First Round	#12 Houston Baptist #5 Kansas	W 79–60; L 56–57
1999	#15	First Round	#2 Stanford	L 57–69
2002	#16	Opening Round	#16 Siena	L 77–81

=== NCAA Division II ===
Alcorn State appeared in the NCAA Division II tournament once. They had a record of 1–1.

Year	Round	Opponent	Result
1969	Round of 32; Sweet Sixteen	Bellarmine; Kentucky Wesleyan	W 76–75; L 79–83

=== NIT results ===
The Braves have appeared in the National Invitation Tournament (NIT) four times. Their record is 1–4.

Year	Round	Opponent	Result
1979	First Round	Mississippi State; Indiana	W 80–78; L 68–72
1985	First Round	Louisville	L 75–77
2022	First Round	Texas A&M	L 62–74
2023	First Round	North Texas	L 53–69

=== NAIA results ===
The Braves have appeared in one NAIA Tournament (NAIA). Their NAIA record is 0–1.

Year	Round	Opponent	Result
1973	First Round	Oklahoma Baptist	L 79–76
