= Alcorn State Braves basketball statistical leaders =

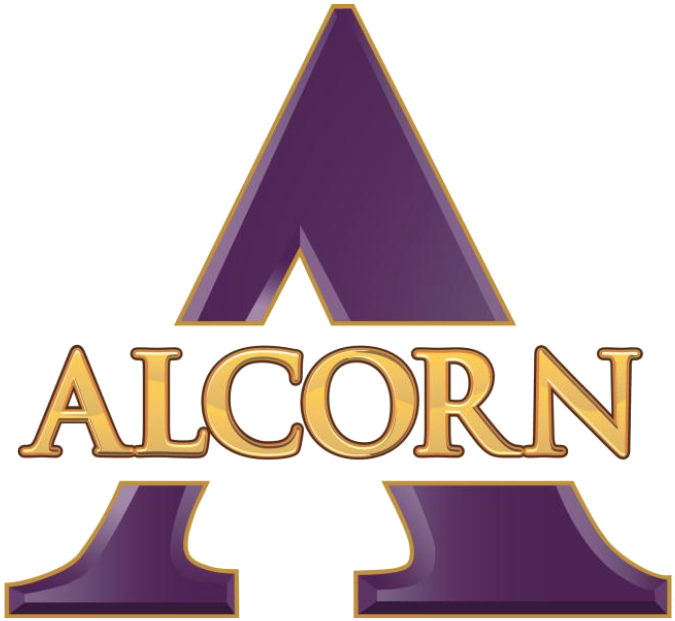

The Alcorn State Braves basketball statistical leaders are individual statistical leaders of the Alcorn State Braves basketball program in various categories, including points, rebounds, assists, steals, and blocks. Within those areas, the lists identify single-game, single-season, and career leaders. The Braves represent Alcorn State University in the NCAA's Southwestern Athletic Conference.

Alcorn State began competing in intercollegiate basketball in 1945. However, the school's record book does not generally list records from before the 1950s, as records from before this period are often incomplete and inconsistent. Since scoring was much lower in this era, and teams played much fewer games during a typical season, it is likely that few or no players from this era would appear on these lists anyway.

The NCAA did not officially record assists as a stat until the 1983–84 season, and blocks and steals until the 1985–86 season, but Alcorn State's record books includes players in these stats before these seasons. These lists are updated through the end of the 2020–21 season.

== Scoring ==
Career
Rk	Player	Points	Seasons
1	Richard Smith	2,527	1952–53 1953–54 1954–55 1955–56
2	Willie Norwood	1,973	1965–66 1966–67 1967–68 1968–69
3	Larry Smith	1,852	1976–77 1977–78 1978–79 1979–80
4	Aaron Brandon	1,740	1981–82 1982–83 1983–84 1984–85
5	Johnny McGill	1,727	1973–74 1974–75 1975–76
6	Dellie Robinson	1,694	1972–73 1973–74 1974–75 1975–76
7	George Holloway	1,679	1951–52 1952–53 1953–54 1954–55
8	Marcus Fleming	1,666	1998–99 1999–00 2000–01 2001–02
9	Michael Phelps	1,664	1981–82 1982–83 1983–84 1984–85
10	Odell Agnew	1,644	1960–61 1961–62 1962–63 1963–64

Season
Rk	Player	Points	Season
1	Richard Smith	886	1952–53
2	Richard Smith	793	1955–56
3	Richard Smith	706	1954–55
4	Johnny McGill	701	1975–76
5	Willie Norwood	633	1966–67
6	Aaron Brandon	603	1983–84
7	Troy Jackson	600	2008–09
8	Odell Agnew	576	1962–63
9	Willie Norwood	559	1968–69
10	Gardner Lee	558	1951–52

Single game
Rk	Player	Points	Season	Opponent
1	Richard Smith	46	1952–53	Texas College
2	Odell Agnew	41	1963–64	Wiley College
	DeCarlos Anderson	41	1995–96	Southern
4	Joseph Martin	38	1971–72	Texas College
5	Joseph Martin	37	1973–74	Georgetown
6	Johnny McGill	36	1974–75	Texas Southern
	Karl Jones	36	1995–96	Southern
	Karl Jones	36	1995–96	Texas Southern
9	Marcus Fleming	35	2000–01	MVSU
10	Jason Cable	33	2000–01	Grambling
	Jeremiah Kendall	33	2022–23	Texas Southern

== Rebounds ==
Career
Rk	Player	Rebounds	Seasons
1	Alfred Milton	1,432	1971–72 1972–73 1973–74 1974–75
2	Willie Norwood	1,413	1965–66 1966–67 1967–68 1968–69
3	Larry Smith	1,334	1976–77 1977–78 1978–79 1979–80
4	Walter Ned	1,247	1962–63 1963–64 1964–65 1965–66
5	Dellie Robinson	1,134	1972–73 1973–74 1974–75 1975–76
6	Levi Wyatt	1,035	1967–68 1968–69 1969–70 1970–71
7	Clinton Wyatt	1,002	1976–77 1977–78 1978–79 1979–80
8	Tommy Collier	968	1981–82 1982–83 1983–84 1984–85
	Nathaniel Archibald	968	1970–71 1971–72 1972–73 1973–74
10	Alfredo Monroe	885	1975–76 1976–77 1977–78 1978–79

Season
Rk	Player	Rebounds	Season
1	Walter Ned	480	1965–66
2	Levi Wyatt	455	1970–71
3	Alfred Milton	410	1973–74
4	Larry Smith	398	1978–79
5	Larry Smith	392	1979–80
6	Levi Wyatt	367	1969–70
7	Clinton Wyatt	302	1979–80
8	Eddie Baker	295	1980–81
9	Clinton Wyatt	276	1977–78
10	Tommy Collier	263	1982–83

Single game
Rk	Player	Rebounds	Season	Opponent
1	Alfred Milton	34	1971–72	Dillard
2	Cornelius Jenkins	21	1977–78	UAPB
	Larry Smith	21	1978–79	MVSU
4	Alfred Milton	20	1974–75	Southern
5	JaMarkus Holt	18	2009–10	Alabama A&M
6	Marcus Fleming	17	2001–02	Siena
	Djahi Binet	17	2024–25	Prairie View A&M
8	Marcus Fleming	16	2000–01	MVSU
	Dion Callans	16	2002–03	Southern
	Reginal Johnson	16	2015–16	MVSU
	Djahi Binet	16	2024–25	UC Riverside
	Djahi Binet	16	2024–25	Texas Southern

== Assists ==
Career
Rk	Player	Assists	Seasons
1	Eddie Archie	766	1981–82 1982–83 1983–84 1984–85
2	Reuben Stiff	568	1995–96 1996–97 1997–98 1998–99
3	Marcus Walton	514	1991–92 1992–93 1993–94 1994–95
4	Davey Whitney Jr.	362	1982–83 1983–84 1984–85 1985–86
5	Byron Joshua	356	2020–21 2021–22 2022–23 2023–24
6	Maurice Howard	339	2016–17 2017–18 2018–19 2019–20
7	Michael Phelps	269	1981–82 1982–83 1983–84 1984–85
8	Jeff Cammon	252	1999–00 2000–01 2001–02
9	Aaron Brandon	243	1981–82 1982–83 1983–84 1984–85
10	Marquis Vance	209	2013–14 2014–15 2015–16 2016–17

Season
Rk	Player	Assists	Season
1	Eddie Archie	229	1982–83
2	Eddie Archie	198	1984–85
3	Eddie Archie	176	1983–84
4	Eddie Archie	163	1981–82
	Reuben Stiff	163	1996–97
6	Marcus Walton	157	1991–92
7	Reuben Stiff	151	1997–98
8	Marcus Walton	148	1992–93
9	Reuben Stiff	140	1995–96
10	Davey Whitney Jr.	137	1985–86

Single game
Rk	Player	Assists	Season	Opponent
1	Eddie Archie	15	1981–82	North Texas
	Eddie Archie	15	1983–84	Alabama State
	Eddie Archie	15	1984–85	Alabama State
4	Eddie Archie	14	1982–83	Prairie View A&M
	Byron Joshua	14	2022–23	Jackson State
6	Jeff Cammon	12	2001–02	Grambling
7	Gilbert Thompson	11	1980–81	Howard
8	Alleo Frazier	10	2002–03	Jackson State
	Troymain Crosby	10	2018–19	Champion Christian
	Maurice Howard	10	2019–20	Mississippi Valley State
	Justin Thomas	10	2021–22	Arkansas Pine-Bluff

== Steals ==
Career
Rk	Player	Steals	Seasons
1	Eddie Archie	388	1981–82 1982–83 1983–84 1984–85
2	Marcus Walton	273	1991–92 1992–93 1993–94 1994–95
3	Reuben Stiff	222	1995–96 1996–97 1997–98 1998–99

Season
Rk	Player	Steals	Season
1	Eddie Archie	112	1983–84
2	Eddie Archie	108	1982–83
3	Eddie Archie	88	1984–85
4	Eddie Archie	80	1981–82
5	Marcus Walton	78	1992–93
6	James Horton	76	1978–79
7	Troy Jackson	75	2008–09
8	Alleo Frazier	74	2002–03
9	Reuben Stiff	73	1998–99
10	Marcus Walton	72	1994–95

Single game
Rk	Player	Steals	Season	Opponent
1	Marcus Walton	11	1994–95	Prairie View A&M
2	Eddie Archie	10	1982–83	Southern
	Eddie Archie	10	1983–84	Alabama State

== Blocks ==
Career
Rk	Player	Blocks	Seasons
1	Tommy Collier	144	1981–82 1982–83 1983–84 1984–85
2	Eddie Baker	141	1977–78 1978–79 1979–80 1980–81
3	Walter Harper	127	1998–99 1999–00 2000–01 2001–02
4	Michael Starks	102	2009–10 2010–11 2011–12 2012–13
5	Clinton Wyatt	101	1976–77 1977–78 1978–79 1979–80
6	Almaad Jackson	92	2003–04 2004–05 2005–06
7	Larry Smith	80	1976–77 1977–78 1978–79 1979–80
8	Marquis Vance	80	2013–14 2014–15 2015–16 2016–17

Season
Rk	Player	Blocks	Season
1	Eddie Baker	63	1979–80
2	Clinton Wyatt	53	1977–78
3	Tommy Collier	50	1984–85
4	Clinton Wyatt	48	1979–80
5	Walter Harper	46	2000–01
6	Tommy Collier	45	1982–83
7	Almaad Jackson	40	2004–05
8	Almaad Jackson	39	2005–06
	Tycen McDaniels	39	2025–26
10	Alfredo Monroe	38	1978–79

Single game
Rk	Player	Steals	Season	Opponent
1	Eddie Baker	6	1980–81	Prairie View A&M
	David Palmer	6	1985–86	Southern
	Walter Harper	6	2000–01	Southern
	Josh Nicholas	6	2013–14	Alabama A&M
