= 1995–96 Mississippi Valley State Delta Devils basketball team =

American college basketball season

1995–96 Mississippi Valley State Delta Devils basketball

SWAC regular season co-champions SWAC tournament champions

NCAA tournament, First Round
- Conference: Southwestern Athletic Conference
- Record: 22–7 (11–3 SWAC)
- Head coach: Lafayette Stribling
- Home arena: Harrison HPER Complex

1995–96 SWAC men's basketball standings
	Conf.				Overall
Team	W		L	PCT	W		L	PCT
Mississippi Valley State †	11	–	3	.786	22	–	7	.759
Jackson State	11	–	3	.786	16	–	13	.552
Southern	9	–	5	.643	17	–	11	.607
Texas Southern	7	–	7	.500	11	–	15	.423
Alcorn State	7	–	7	.500	10	–	15	.400
Grambling	6	–	8	.429	12	–	16	.429
Alabama State	5	–	9	.357	9	–	18	.333
Prairie View A&M	0	–	14	.000	4	–	23	.148
† 1996 SWAC tournament winner Rankings from AP Poll

The 1995–96 Mississippi Valley State Delta Devils basketball team represented Mississippi Valley State University during the 1995–96 NCAA Division I men's basketball season. The Delta Devils, led by head coach Lafayette Stribling, played their home games at Harrison HPER Complex as members of the Southwestern Athletic Conference. The Delta Devils finished the season 22–7, 11–3 in SWAC play to be crowned SWAC regular season champions. They also won the SWAC Basketball tournament to earn the conference's automatic bid into the 1996 NCAA tournament. As the No. 15 seed in the East Region, the Delta Devils were beaten by Georgetown in the opening round, 93–56.

== Roster ==
1995–96 Mississippi Valley State Delta Devils men's basketball team
Players	Coaches
Pos. / # / Name / Height / Weight / Year / Hometown; C / / Marcus Mann / 6 ft 8 in (2.03 m) / — / Sr / Carthage, Mississippi	Head coach: Lafayette Stribling; Assistant coach(es) Legend: (C) Team captain; (S) Suspended; (I) Ineligible; (W) Walk-on; Injured; Current redshirt

== Schedule and results ==
Date time, TV	Rank^{#}	Opponent^{#}	Result	Record	Site (attendance) city, state
Regular season
SWAC tournament
Mar 8, 1996*	(2)	vs. (3) Southern; Semifinals	W 83–76	21–6	Joe L. Reed Acadome; Montgomery, Alabama
Mar 9, 1996*	(2)	vs. (1) Jackson State; Championship game	W 111–94	22–6	Joe L. Reed Acadome; Montgomery, Alabama
NCAA tournament
Mar 15, 1996*	(15 E)	vs. (2 E) No. 4 Georgetown; First round	L 56–93	22–7	Richmond Coliseum; Richmond, Virginia
*Non-conference game. ^{#}Rankings from AP Poll. (#) Tournament seedings in parentheses. All times are in Central Time.
