= 2002 SWAC men's basketball tournament =

Basketball Tournament March 2001 in Alabama

- Classification: Division I
- Season: 2001–02
- Teams: 8
- Site: Bill Harris Arena; Birmingham, Alabama
- Champions: Alcorn State (6th title)
- Winning coach: Davey Whitney (6th title)

2001–02 SWAC men's basketball standings
	Conf.				Overall
Team	W		L	PCT	W		L	PCT
Alcorn State †	16	–	2	.889	21	–	10	.677
Alabama A&M	12	–	6	.667	19	–	10	.655
Alabama State	12	–	6	.667	19	–	13	.594
Texas Southern	10	–	8	.556	11	–	17	.393
Mississippi Valley State	9	–	9	.500	12	–	17	.414
Prairie View A&M	8	–	10	.444	10	–	20	.333
Jackson State	8	–	10	.444	9	–	19	.321
Grambling State	7	–	11	.389	9	–	19	.321
Southern	6	–	12	.333	7	–	20	.259
Arkansas–Pine Bluff	2	–	16	.111	2	–	26	.071
† 2002 SWAC tournament winner Rankings from AP Poll

The 2002 SWAC men's basketball tournament was held March 5–9, 2002, at Bill Harris Arena in Birmingham, Alabama. Alcorn State defeated Alabama State, 70–67 in the championship game. The Braves received the conference's automatic bid to the 2002 NCAA tournament as one of two No. 16 seeds in the East Region. In the play-in game, Alcorn State was beaten by Siena.

== Bracket and results ==
Quarterfinals; March 5
1	Alcorn State	108
8	Grambling State	84
4	Texas Southern	68
5	Mississippi Valley State	61
3	Alabama State	60
6	Jackson State	56
2	Alabama A&M	114
7	Prairie View A&M	82

Semifinals; March 8
1	Alcorn State	87
4	Texas Southern	65
3	Alabama State	64
2	Alabama A&M	61

Final; March 9
1	Alcorn State	70
3	Alabama State	67
