= 1991–92 Mississippi Valley State Delta Devils basketball team =

American college basketball season

1991–92 Mississippi Valley State Delta Devils basketball

SWAC regular season & tournament champions

NCAA tournament, First Round
- Conference: Southwestern Athletic Conference
- Record: 16–14 (11–3 SWAC)
- Head coach: Lafayette Stribling (9th season)
- Home arena: Harrison HPER Complex

1991–92 SWAC men's basketball standings
	Conf.				Overall
Team	W		L	PCT	W		L	PCT
Mississippi Valley State †	11	–	3	.786	16	–	14	.533
Texas Southern	11	–	3	.786	15	–	14	.517
Southern	9	–	5	.643	18	–	12	.600
Alcorn State	8	–	6	.571	15	–	14	.517
Alabama State	8	–	6	.571	14	–	14	.500
Jackson State	7	–	7	.500	12	–	16	.429
Grambling State	2	–	12	.143	4	–	24	.143
Prairie View A&M	0	–	14	.000	0	–	28	.000
† 1992 SWAC tournament winner Rankings from AP Poll

The 1991–92 Mississippi Valley State Delta Devils basketball team represented Mississippi Valley State University during the 1991–92 NCAA Division I men's basketball season. The Delta Devils, led by head coach Lafayette Stribling, played their home games at Harrison HPER Complex as members of the Southwestern Athletic Conference. The Delta Devils finished the season 16–14, 11–3 in SWAC play to be crowned SWAC regular season champions. They also won the SWAC Basketball tournament to earn the conference's automatic bid into the 1992 NCAA tournament. As the No. 16 seed in the Southeast Region, the Delta Devils were beaten by Ohio State in the opening round, 83–56.

== Roster ==
1991–92 Mississippi Valley State Delta Devils men's basketball team
Players
Coaches

Pos.	#	Name	Height	Weight	Year	Hometown
G	4	Alphonso Ford	6 ft 3 in (1.91 m)	190 lb (86 kg)	Jr	Greenwood, Mississippi
F		Derrick Harvey	6 ft 7 in (2.01 m)	—	Sr
G		Martell Willis	6 ft 4 in (1.93 m)	—	Sr
G		Bobby Green	6 ft 3 in (1.91 m)	—	Jr
F		Howard Young	6 ft 5 in (1.96 m)	—	Jr
C		Mark Buford	6 ft 11 in (2.11 m)	—	Jr	Memphis, Tennessee
F		Fred Ford	6 ft 5 in (1.96 m)	—	Fr
F		George Norris	6 ft 6 in (1.98 m)	—	Fr
G		Derrick Smith	6 ft 6 in (1.98 m)	—	Fr
F		Darwin Greene	6 ft 5 in (1.96 m)	—	Jr
G		Maurice Bryant	5 ft 10 in (1.78 m)	—	Fr
F		Troy Johnson	6 ft 5 in (1.96 m)	—	Sr

Head coach

- Lafayette Stribling

Assistant coach(es)

Legend

- (C) Team captain
- (S) Suspended
- (I) Ineligible
- (W) Walk-on
- Injured
- Current redshirt

== Schedule and results ==
Date time, TV	Rank^{#}	Opponent^{#}	Result	Record	Site (attendance) city, state
Regular season
Dec 17, 1991*		at Marquette	L 62–87	1–6	Bradley Center; Milwaukee, Wisconsin
Dec 30, 1991*		vs. No. 14 Oklahoma; Cardinal Classic	L 95–117	1–7	Montagne Center; Beaumont, Texas
SWAC tournament
Feb 27, 1992*	(1)	vs. (8) Prairie View; Quarterfinals	W 112–79	14–13	Riverside Centroplex; Baton Rouge, Louisiana
Feb 28, 1992*	(1)	vs. (4) Alcorn State; Semifinals	W 76–72	15–13	Riverside Centroplex; Baton Rouge, Louisiana
Feb 29, 1992*	(1)	vs. (3) Southern; Championship Game	W 85–77	16–13	Riverside Centroplex; Baton Rouge, Louisiana
1992 NCAA tournament
Mar 19, 1992*	(16 SE)	vs. (1 SE) No. 3 Ohio State; First Round	L 56–83	16–14	Riverfront Coliseum; Cincinnati, Ohio
*Non-conference game. ^{#}Rankings from AP Poll. (#) Tournament seedings in parentheses. All times are in Central Time.
