= 1986 SWAC men's basketball tournament =

Basketball Tournament March 1986 in Mississippi

- Classification: Division I
- Season: 1985–86
- Teams: 8
- Site: Mississippi Coast Coliseum; Biloxi, Mississippi
- Champions: Mississippi Valley State (1st title)
- Winning coach: Lafayette Stribling (1st title)

1985–86 SWAC men's basketball standings
| | Conf. | | | | Overall |
| Team | W | | L | PCT | W | | L | PCT |
|---|---|---|---|---|---|---|---|---|
| Southern | 11 | – | 3 | .786 | 19 | – | 8 | .704 |
| Alcorn State | 11 | – | 3 | .786 | 16 | – | 13 | .552 |
| Mississippi Valley State † | 10 | – | 4 | .714 | 20 | – | 11 | .645 |
| Jackson State | 9 | – | 5 | .643 | 14 | – | 15 | .483 |
| Texas Southern | 6 | – | 8 | .429 | 9 | – | 18 | .333 |
| Grambling State | 4 | – | 10 | .286 | 14 | – | 12 | .538 |
| Alabama State | 4 | – | 10 | .286 | 11 | – | 17 | .393 |
| Prairie View A&M | 1 | – | 13 | .071 | 5 | – | 25 | .167 |
† 1986 SWAC tournament winner Rankings from AP Poll

The 1986 SWAC men's basketball tournament was held March 7–9, 1986, at the Mississippi Coast Coliseum in Biloxi, Mississippi. Mississippi Valley State defeated Prairie View A&M, 75–58 in the championship game. The Delta Devils received the conference's automatic bid to the 1986 NCAA tournament as No. 16 seed in the East Region.

== Bracket and results ==
Quarterfinals; March 7
1 | Southern | 67
8 | Prairie View A&M | 75
4 | Jackson State | 78
5 | Texas Southern | 69
3 | Mississippi Valley State | 77
6 | Alabama State | 64
2 | Alcorn State | 71
7 | Grambling State | 53

Semifinals; March 8
8 | Prairie View A&M | 84
4 | Jackson State | 70
3 | Mississippi Valley State | 71
2 | Alcorn State | 70

Final; March 9
8 | Prairie View A&M | 58
3 | Mississippi Valley State | 75
