= Mark Buford =

American basketball player (born 1970)

Personal information
- Born: October 8, 1970 (age 56) Memphis, Tennessee, U.S.
- Listed height: 6 ft 10 in (2.08 m)
- Listed weight: 270 lb (122 kg)

Career information
- High school: Hillcrest (Memphis, Tennessee)
- College: Mississippi Valley State (1990–1993)
- NBA draft: 1993: 2nd round, 49th overall pick
- Drafted by: Phoenix Suns
- Playing career: 1993–1999
- Position: Center

Career history
- 1993–1994: Pallacanestro Varese
- 1994–1995: Shreveport Crawdads
- 1995: Tri-City Chinook
- 1995: Memphis Fire
- 1996: Gimnasia y Esgrima (CR)
- 1996–1997: Regatas San Nicolás
- 1998–1999: Club Atlético Cordón
- Stats at Basketball Reference

Mark Buford (born October 8, 1970) is an American former professional basketball player. He played for the Mississippi Valley State Delta Devils for three seasons. Buford was selected by the Phoenix Suns as the 49th overall pick in the 1993 NBA draft but did not sign with the team. He was signed by the Cleveland Cavaliers in 1994 but was waived before the start of the season. Buford played professionally in Italy and Argentina (two seasons) as well as in the American Continental Basketball Association and United States Basketball League.

== Career statistics ==
Legend
GP	Games played	GS	Games started	MPG	Minutes per game
FG%	Field goal percentage	3P%	3-point field goal percentage	FT%	Free throw percentage
RPG	Rebounds per game	APG	Assists per game	SPG	Steals per game
BPG	Blocks per game	PPG	Points per game	**Bold**	Career high

=== College ===
Year	Team	GP	GS	MPG	FG%	3P%	FT%	RPG	APG	SPG	BPG	PPG
1990–91	Mississippi Valley State	18	–	13.8	.408	–	.200	2.3	.0	.4	.3	2.3
1991–92	Mississippi Valley State	**30**	–	19.9	**.453**	–	**.618**	5.8	**.2**	.6	**.8**	4.9
1992–93	Mississippi Valley State	28	–	**26.1**	**.453**	**.000**	.551	**7.4**	.1	**.8**	.6	**12.9**
Career		76	–	20.7	.449	.000	.555	5.6	.1	.7	.6	7.2
