= 1985–86 Mississippi Valley State Delta Devils basketball team =

American college basketball season

1985–86 Mississippi Valley State Delta Devils men's basketball

SWAC tournament champions

NCAA tournament, First Round
- Conference: Southwestern Athletic Conference
- Record: 20–11 (10–4 SWAC)
- Head coach: Lafayette Stribling (3rd season)
- Home arena: Harrison HPER Complex

1985–86 SWAC men's basketball standings
	Conf.				Overall
Team	W		L	PCT	W		L	PCT
Southern	11	–	3	.786	19	–	8	.704
Alcorn State	11	–	3	.786	16	–	13	.552
Mississippi Valley State †	10	–	4	.714	20	–	11	.645
Jackson State	9	–	5	.643	14	–	15	.483
Texas Southern	6	–	8	.429	9	–	18	.333
Grambling State	4	–	10	.286	14	–	12	.538
Alabama State	4	–	10	.286	11	–	17	.393
Prairie View A&M	1	–	13	.071	5	–	25	.167
† 1986 SWAC tournament winner Rankings from AP Poll

The 1985–86 Mississippi Valley State Delta Devils basketball team represented Mississippi Valley State University during the 1985–86 NCAA Division I men's basketball season. The Delta Devils, led by head coach Lafayette Stribling, played their home games at Harrison HPER Complex as members of the Southwestern Athletic Conference. The Delta Devils finished the season 20–11, 10–4 in SWAC play to finish in 3rd pace. They won the SWAC Basketball tournament to earn the conference's automatic bid into the 1986 NCAA tournament – the first appearance in school history. As the No. 16 seed in the East Region, the Delta Devils played a tough game before falling to No. 1 overall seed and eventual National runner-up Duke in the opening round, 85–78.

== Roster ==
1985–86 Mississippi Valley State Delta Devils men's basketball team
Players
Coaches

Pos.	#	Name	Height	Weight	Year	Hometown
G		George Ivory	6 ft 0 in (1.83 m)	—	Jr	Greenwood, Mississippi
F		Mark Coleman	6 ft 3 in (1.91 m)	—	Sr

Head coach

- Lafayette Stribling

Assistant coach(es)

Legend

- (C) Team captain
- (S) Suspended
- (I) Ineligible
- (W) Walk-on
- Injured
- Current redshirt

== Schedule and results ==
Date time, TV	Rank^{#}	Opponent^{#}	Result	Record	Site (attendance) city, state
Regular season
Dec 19, 1985*		at Ball State	L 63–73	2–3	Irving Gymnasium; Muncie, Indiana
Jan 6, 1986*		at Missouri	L 67–81	3–4	Hearnes Center; Columbia, Missouri
SWAC tournament
Mar 7, 1986*	(3)	vs. (6) Alabama State; Quarterfinal	W 77–64	18–10	Mississippi Coliseum; Biloxi, Mississippi
Mar 8, 1986*	(3)	vs. (2) Alcorn State; Semifinals	W 71–70	19–10	Mississippi Coliseum; Biloxi, Mississippi
Mar 9, 1986*	(3)	vs. (8) Prairie View; Championship game	W 75–58	20–10	Mississippi Coliseum; Biloxi, Mississippi
1986 NCAA tournament
Mar 13, 1986*	(16 E)	vs. (1 E) No. 1 Duke; First Round	L 78–85	20–11	Greensboro Coliseum; Greensboro, North Carolina
*Non-conference game. ^{#}Rankings from AP Poll. (#) Tournament seedings in parentheses. All times are in Central Time (#) during NCAA Tournament is seed with Region.
