= 1982 SWAC men's basketball tournament =

Basketball Tournament March 1982 in Louisiana

- Classification: Division I
- Season: 1981–82
- Teams: 7
- First round site: Campus Sites
- Semifinals site: F. G. Clark Center; Baton Rouge, Louisiana
- Finals site: F. G. Clark Center; Baton Rouge, Louisiana
- Champions: Alcorn State (3rd title)
- Winning coach: Davey Whitney (3rd title)

1981–82 SWAC men's basketball standings
	Conf.				Overall
Team	W		L	PCT	W		L	PCT
Alcorn State †	10	–	2	.833	22	–	8	.733
Jackson State	10	–	2	.833	19	–	9	.679
Texas Southern	8	–	4	.667	21	–	8	.724
Grambling State	6	–	6	.500	12	–	17	.414
Mississippi Valley State	4	–	8	.333	6	–	20	.231
Southern	3	–	9	.250	7	–	18	.280
Prairie View A&M	1	–	11	.083	2	–	23	.080
† 1982 SWAC tournament winner Rankings from AP Poll

The 1982 SWAC men's basketball tournament was held March 4–6, 1982. The Tournament was held in Baton Rouge, Louisiana at the Centroplex Center. Alcorn State defeated Jackson State, 87–77 in the championship game. The Braves received the conference's automatic bid to the 1982 NCAA tournament as No. 11 seed in the Midwest Region.

== Bracket and results ==
Quarterfinals; March 4
4	Grambling State	84
5	Mississippi Valley State	83
3	Texas Southern	70
6	Southern	64
2	Alcorn State	102
7	Prairie View	69

Semifinals; March 5
1	Jackson State	65
4	Grambling State	45
3	Texas Southern	82
2	Alcorn State	85

Final; March 6
1	Jackson State	77
2	Alcorn State	87
Third place
4	Grambling State	70
3	Texas Southern	80
