= 1999 SWAC men's basketball tournament =

Basketball Tournament March 1999 in Louisiana

- Classification: Division I
- Season: 1998–99
- Teams: 8
- First round site: Campus Sites
- Semifinals site: F. G. Clark Activity Center; Baton Rouge, Louisiana
- Finals site: F. G. Clark Activity Center; Baton Rouge, Louisiana
- Champions: Alcorn State (5th title)
- Winning coach: Davey Whitney (5th title)

1998–99 SWAC men's basketball standings
	Conf.				Overall
Team	W		L	PCT	W		L	PCT
Alcorn State †	14	–	2	.875	23	–	7	.767
Southern	13	–	3	.813	21	–	7	.750
Jackson State	11	–	5	.688	16	–	12	.571
Mississippi Valley State	10	–	6	.625	14	–	13	.519
Alabama State	8	–	8	.500	11	–	16	.407
Texas Southern	6	–	10	.375	8	–	19	.296
Grambling State	5	–	11	.313	6	–	21	.222
Prairie View A&M	4	–	12	.250	6	–	21	.222
Arkansas–Pine Bluff	1	–	15	.063	3	–	24	.111
Alabama A&M	0	–	0	–	10	–	17	.370
† 1999 SWAC tournament winner Rankings from AP Poll

The 1999 SWAC men's basketball tournament was held March 3–5, 1999. The quarterfinal round was held at the home arena of the higher-seeded team, while the semifinal and championship rounds were held at the F. G. Clark Activity Center in Baton Rouge, Louisiana. Alcorn State defeated Southern, 89–83 in the championship game. The Braves received the conference's automatic bid to the 1999 NCAA tournament as No. 15 seed in the West Region.

== Bracket and results ==
Quarterfinals; March 3
1	Alcorn State	114
8	Prairie View A&M	61
4	Mississippi Valley State	71
5	Alabama State	58
3	Jackson State	73
6	Texas Southern	49
2	Southern	92
7	Grambling State	83

Semifinals; March 5
1	Alcorn State	73
4	Mississippi Valley State	61
3	Jackson State	66
2	Southern	67

Final; March 7
1	Alcorn State	89
2	Southern	83
