= 2001–02 Alcorn State Braves basketball team =

American college basketball season

2001–02 Alcorn State Braves basketball

SWAC regular season & tournament champions

NCAA tournament, opening round
- Conference: Southwestern Athletic Conference
- Record: 21–10 (16–2 SWAC)
- Head coach: Davey Whitney (26th season)
- Home arena: Davey Whitney Complex

2001–02 SWAC men's basketball standings
	Conf.				Overall
Team	W		L	PCT	W		L	PCT
Alcorn State †	16	–	2	.889	21	–	10	.677
Alabama A&M	12	–	6	.667	19	–	10	.655
Alabama State	12	–	6	.667	19	–	13	.594
Texas Southern	10	–	8	.556	11	–	17	.393
Mississippi Valley State	9	–	9	.500	12	–	17	.414
Prairie View A&M	8	–	10	.444	10	–	20	.333
Jackson State	8	–	10	.444	9	–	19	.321
Grambling State	7	–	11	.389	9	–	19	.321
Southern	6	–	12	.333	7	–	20	.259
Arkansas–Pine Bluff	2	–	16	.111	2	–	26	.071
† 2002 SWAC tournament winner Rankings from AP Poll

The 2001–02 Alcorn State Braves basketball team represented Alcorn State University during the 2001–02 NCAA Division I men's basketball season. The Braves, led by head coach Davey Whitney, played their home games at the Davey Whitney Complex and were members of the Southwestern Athletic Conference. They finished the season 21–10, 16–2 in SWAC play to win the conference regular season. They also won the SWAC tournament to receive the conference's automatic bid to the NCAA tournament. Playing as one of two No. 16 seeds in the East region, the Braves were defeated by fellow No. 16 seed Siena, 81–77.

== Roster ==
2001–02 Alcorn State Braves men's basketball team
Players
Coaches

Pos.	#	Name	Height	Weight	Year	Hometown
F		Marcus Fleming	6 ft 8 in (2.03 m)	—	Sr
C		Walter Harper	6 ft 8 in (2.03 m)	—	Sr

Head coach

- Davey Whitney

Assistant coach(es)

Legend

- (C) Team captain
- (S) Suspended
- (I) Ineligible
- (W) Walk-on
- Injured
- Current redshirt

== Schedule and results ==
Date time, TV	Rank^{#}	Opponent^{#}	Result	Record	Site (attendance) city, state
Regular season
Nov 19, 2001*		at New Mexico State	L 72–82	0–1	Pan American Center; Las Cruces, New Mexico
Nov 24, 2001*		Tougaloo	W 82–70	1–1	Davey Whitney Complex; Lorman, Mississippi
Nov 27, 2001*		at Southern Miss	L 60–66	1–2	Reed Green Coliseum; Hattiesburg, Mississippi
Dec 1, 2001*		at New Mexico	L 55–87	1–3	University Arena; Albuquerque, New Mexico
Dec 4, 2001*		at UAB	L 61–102	1–4	Bartow Arena; Birmingham, Alabama
Dec 10, 2001*		at Hawaii	L 48–62	1–5	Stan Sheriff Center (5,543); Honolulu, Hawaii
Dec 15, 2001		at Prairie View A&M	W 79–77	2–5 (1–0)	William J. Nicks Building; Prairie View, Texas
Dec 17, 2001		at Texas Southern	W 88–83	3–5 (2–0)	Health and Physical Education Arena; Houston, Texas
Jan 5, 2002		Jackson State	W 86–75	4–5 (3–0)	Davey Whitney Complex; Lorman, Mississippi
Jan 7, 2002		Grambling State	W 99–87	5–5 (4–0)	Davey Whitney Complex; Lorman, Mississippi
Jan 12, 2002		at Mississippi Valley State	W 88–77	6–5 (5–0)	Harrison HPER Complex; Itta Bena, Mississippi
Jan 14, 2002		at Arkansas–Pine Bluff	W 73–65	7–5 (6–0)	K. L. Johnson Complex; Pine Bluff, Arkansas
Jan 19, 2002		Alabama State	W 75–61	8–5 (7–0)	Davey Whitney Complex; Lorman, Mississippi
Jan 21, 2002		Alabama A&M	W 91–82	9–5 (8–0)	Davey Whitney Complex; Lorman, Mississippi
Jan 23, 2002*		at Morris Brown	L 64–66	9–6	John H. Lewis Gym; Atlanta, Georgia
Jan 26, 2002		at Southern	W 86–69	10–6 (9–0)	F. G. Clark Center; Baton Rouge, Louisiana
Jan 28, 2002*		at UTEP	L 76–80	10–7	Don Haskins Center; El Paso, Texas
Feb 2, 2002		at Jackson State	W 81–78 ^{3OT}	11–7 (10–0)	Williams Assembly Center; Jackson, Mississippi
Feb 4, 2002		at Grambling State	W 87–85 ^{OT}	12–7 (11–0)	Tiger Memorial Gym; Grambling, Louisiana
Feb 9, 2002		Mississippi Valley State	W 87–86	13–7 (12–0)	Davey Whitney Complex; Lorman, Mississippi
Feb 11, 2002		Arkansas–Pine Bluff	W 84–66	14–7 (13–0)	Davey Whitney Complex; Lorman, Mississippi
Feb 16, 2002		at Alabama State	L 59–73	14–8 (13–1)	Joe L. Reed Acadome; Montgomery, Alabama
Feb 18, 2002		at Alabama A&M	L 86–91	14–9 (13–2)	Elmore Gymnasium; Normal, Alabama
Feb 23, 2002		Southern	W 87–73	15–9 (14–2)	Davey Whitney Complex; Lorman, Mississippi
Feb 25, 2002*		Morris Brown	W 92–69	16–9	Davey Whitney Complex; Lorman, Mississippi
Feb 28, 2002		Texas Southern	W 93–86	17–9 (15–2)	Davey Whitney Complex; Lorman, Mississippi
Mar 2, 2002		Prairie View A&M	W 92–77	18–9 (16–2)	Davey Whitney Complex; Lorman, Mississippi
SWAC tournament
Mar 5, 2002*	(1)	(8) Grambling State; Quarterfinals	W 108–84	19–9	Davey Whitney Complex; Lorman, Mississippi
Mar 8, 2002*	(1)	vs. (4) Texas Southern; Semifinals	W 87–65	20–9	Bill Harris Arena; Birmingham, Alabama
Mar 9, 2002*	(1)	vs. (3) Alabama State; Championship Game	W 70–67	21–9	Bill Harris Arena; Birmingham, Alabama
NCAA tournament
Mar 12, 2002*	(16 E)	vs. (16 E) Siena; Play-in game	L 77–81	21–10	University of Dayton Arena; Dayton, Ohio
*Non-conference game. ^{#}Rankings from AP Poll. (#) Tournament seedings in parentheses. E=East. All times are in Central Time.
