= Kulmoris Joiner =

- Born: March 26, 1980 (age 44)
- Occupation: executive of athletic programs
- Known for: Director of Football Operations at Grambling University (2004–2007), Director of Athletics for Operations at Alcorn State University (2011–)

Kulmoris Demetris Joiner (born March 26, 1980) is the former director of athletics for operations at Alcorn State University. Previously, he was the director of football operations for the Grambling State Tigers located in Grambling, Louisiana and he held that position for three seasons, from 2005 until 2007. Joiner was selected on February 19, 2011, to the post of director of athletic operations of Alcorn State University.
