= Gilad Landau =

Israeli footballer

Gilad Landau גלעד לנדאו
Personal information
- Date of birth: 1968 (age 57–58)
- Place of birth: Netanya, Israel

Youth career
- Maccabi Netanya

Senior career*
Years	Team	Apps	(Gls)
- Maccabi Netanya
- → Beitar Netanya (loan)
- * Club domestic league appearances and goals

Gilad Landau (Hebrew: גלעד לנדאו) is an Israeli former footballer, who became an All-American placekicker at Grambling State Tigers in the early 1990s.
