= 1978–79 Alcorn State Braves basketball team =

American college basketball season

1978–79 Alcorn State Braves basketball

SWAC tournament champions

NIT tournament, Second round
- Conference: Southwestern Athletic Conference
- Record: 28–1 (12–0 SWAC)
- Head coach: Davey Whitney (10th season)
- Home arena: Physical Education Complex

1978–79 SWAC men's basketball standings
	Conf.				Overall
Team	W		L	PCT	W		L	PCT
Alcorn State †	12	–	0	1.000	28	–	1	.966
Grambling	6	–	6	.500	16	–	11	.593
Southern	6	–	6	.500	16	–	12	.571
Texas Southern	6	–	6	.500	13	–	14	.481
Jackson State	4	–	8	.333	13	–	14	.481
Mississippi Valley State		–		–	15	–	16	.484
Prairie View		–		–	17	–	14	.548
† 1979 SWAC tournament winner Rankings from AP Poll

The 1978–79 Alcorn State Braves basketball team represented Alcorn State University during the 1978–79 NCAA Division I men's basketball season. The Braves, led by head coach Davey Whitney, played their home games at the Davey Whitney Complex and were members of the Southwestern Athletic Conference. They finished the season 27–0, 12–0 in SWAC, but did not receive a bid to the NCAA tournament because the SWAC was in a transition period and did not have an automatic qualifier. Instead, the Braves accepted a bid to play in the NIT where they lost in the second round to eventual NIT champion Indiana.

== Roster ==
1978–79 Alcorn State Braves men's basketball team
Players
Coaches

Pos.	#	Name	Height	Weight	Year	Hometown
F		Larry Smith	6 ft 8 in (2.03 m)	210 lb (95 kg)	Sr	Simmons	Rolling Fork, Mississippi
G		James Horton	5 ft 7 in (1.7 m)	—	Sr
C		Alfredo Monroe	6 ft 8 in (2.03 m)	—	Sr
G		Ronnie Smith	6 ft 3 in (1.91 m)	—	Sr
G		Joe Jenkins	6 ft 5 in (1.96 m)	—	Jr
F		Cornelius Jenkins	6 ft 9 in (2.06 m)	—	Sr
F		Clinton Wyatt	6 ft 5 in (1.96 m)	—	Jr
C		Eddie Baker	6 ft 9 in (2.06 m)	—	So
G		E.J. Bell	6 ft 2 in (1.88 m)	—	Jr
G		Richard Horton	5 ft 8 in (1.73 m)	—	Fr
F		Bill Howard	6 ft 7 in (2.01 m)	—	Jr
		W. Anderson	—	—
		M. Washington	—	—
F		Albert Irving	6 ft 7 in (2.01 m)	—	Fr
G		Dwight Alexander	6 ft 0 in (1.83 m)	—	Fr
G		Gilbert Thompson	6 ft 2 in (1.88 m)	—	So

Head coach

- Davey Whitney

Assistant coach(es)

Legend

- (C) Team captain
- (S) Suspended
- (I) Ineligible
- (W) Walk-on
- Injured
- Current redshirt

Roster
Last update: March 25, 2024

== Schedule and results ==
Date time, TV	Rank^{#}	Opponent^{#}	Result	Record	Site (attendance) city, state
Regular season
Dec 1, 1978*		at Xavier (LA)	W 104–91	1–0	The Barn; New Orleans, Louisiana
Dec 8, 1978*		Savannah State	W 98–60	2–0	Physical Education Complex; Lorman, Mississippi
Dec 11, 1978*		at Dillard	W 103–89	3–0	
Dec 14, 1978*		at Tougaloo	W 98–76	4–0	
Dec 20, 1978*		Arkansas–Pine Bluff	W 116–85	5–0	Physical Education Complex; Lorman, Mississippi
Dec 29, 1978*		vs. Kentucky State	W 82–75 ^{OT}	6–0	College Park Auditorium
Dec 30, 1978*		vs. Alabama State	W 83–80	7–0	College Park Auditorium
Jan 3, 1979*		Dillard	W 94–83	8–0	Physical Education Complex; Lorman, Mississippi
Jan 6, 1979		at Jackson State	W 82–70	9–0 (1–0)	College Park Auditorium
Jan 8, 1979		at Southern	W 107–101 ^{OT}	10–0 (2–0)	F. G. Clark Center; Baton Rouge, Louisiana
Jan 11, 1979		at Mississippi Valley State	W 92–64	11–0 (3–0)	Harrison HPER Complex; Itta Bena, Mississippi
Jan 13, 1979		Grambling	W 100–86	12–0 (4–0)	Physical Education Complex; Lorman, Mississippi
Jan 15, 1979*		Xavier (LA)	W 85–80	13–0	Physical Education Complex; Lorman, Mississippi
Jan 17, 1979*		at Bishop College	W 100–82	14–0	
Jan 20, 1979		Texas Southern	W 92–74	15–0 (5–0)	Physical Education Complex; Lorman, Mississippi
Jan 22, 1979		Prairie View	W 103–89	16–0 (6–0)	Physical Education Complex; Lorman, Mississippi
Jan 27, 1979		at Prairie View	W 78–74	17–0 (7–0)	William J. Nicks Building; Prairie View, Texas
Jan 29, 1979		at Texas Southern	W 81–63	18–0 (8–0)	University Auditorium
Jan 31, 1979*		at Tougaloo	W 92–74	19–0	
Feb 1, 1979*		at Arkansas–Pine Bluff	W 95–89	20–0	Convention Center
Feb 5, 1979		Mississippi Valley State	W 90–69	21–0 (9–0)	Physical Education Complex; Lorman, Mississippi
Feb 10, 1979		Jackson State	W 84–71	22–0 (10–0)	Physical Education Complex; Lorman, Mississippi
Feb 12, 1979		Southern	W 88–84	23–0 (11–0)	Physical Education Complex; Lorman, Mississippi
Feb 14, 1979*		Bishop College	W 98–81	24–0	Physical Education Complex; Lorman, Mississippi
Feb 17, 1979		at Grambling	W 76–74	25–0 (12–0)	Tiger Memorial Gym; Grambling, Louisiana
SWAC tournament
Feb 23, 1979	(1)	vs. (4) Mississippi Valley State; Semifinals	W 88–84	26–0	Baton Rouge River Center; Baton Rouge, Louisiana
Feb 24, 1979	(1)	at (2) Southern; Championship game	W 108–89	27–0	Baton Rouge River Center; Baton Rouge, Louisiana
NIT tournament
Mar 8, 1979*		at Mississippi State; First round	W 80–78	28–0	Humphrey Coliseum; Mississippi State, Mississippi
Mar 12, 1979*		at Indiana; Second round	L 69–73	28–1	Assembly Hall; Bloomington, Indiana
*Non-conference game. ^{#}Rankings from AP Poll. (#) Tournament seedings in parentheses. All times are in Central Time.
