= 1984 SWAC men's basketball tournament =

Basketball Tournament March 1984 in Mississippi

- Classification: Division I
- Season: 1983–84
- Teams: 6
- First round site: Campus Sites
- Semifinals site: Mississippi Coliseum; Jackson, Mississippi
- Finals site: Mississippi Coliseum; Jackson, Mississippi
- Champions: Alcorn State (5th title)
- Winning coach: Davey Whitney (5th title)

1983–84 SWAC men's basketball standings
	Conf.				Overall
Team	W		L	PCT	W		L	PCT
Alcorn State †	11	–	3	.786	21	–	10	.677
Alabama State	11	–	3	.786	22	–	6	.786
Southern	10	–	4	.714	16	–	12	.571
Grambling State	7	–	7	.500	17	–	12	.586
Mississippi Valley State	6	–	8	.429	15	–	13	.536
Texas Southern	6	–	8	.429	12	–	17	.414
Jackson State	5	–	9	.357	10	–	18	.357
Prairie View A&M	0	–	14	.000	2	–	26	.071
† 1984 SWAC tournament winner Rankings from AP Poll

The 1984 SWAC men's basketball tournament was held March 7–9, 1984. The quarterfinal round was held at the home arena of the higher-seeded team, while the semifinal and championship rounds were held at the Mississippi Coliseum in Jackson, Mississippi. Alcorn State defeated Texas Southern, 78–69 in the championship game. The Braves received the conference's automatic bid to the 1984 NCAA tournament as one of two No. 12 seeds in the Midwest Region.

== Bracket and results ==
Quarterfinals; March 7
3	Grambling State	59
6	Prairie View A&M	46
4	Texas Southern	67
5	Jackson State	65

Semifinals; March 8
1	Alcorn State	76
3	Grambling State	51
4	Texas Southern	73
2	Southern	69

Final; March 9
1	Alcorn State	78
4	Texas Southern	69
