= 1992 SWAC men's basketball tournament =

Basketball Tournament March 1991 in Texas

- Classification: Division I
- Season: 1991–92
- Teams: 8
- Site: Riverside Centroplex; Baton Rouge, Louisiana
- Champions: Mississippi Valley State (2nd title)
- Winning coach: Lafayette Stribling (2nd title)

1991–92 SWAC men's basketball standings
	Conf.				Overall
Team	W		L	PCT	W		L	PCT
Mississippi Valley State †	11	–	3	.786	16	–	14	.533
Texas Southern	11	–	3	.786	15	–	14	.517
Southern	9	–	5	.643	18	–	12	.600
Alcorn State	8	–	6	.571	15	–	14	.517
Alabama State	8	–	6	.571	14	–	14	.500
Jackson State	7	–	7	.500	12	–	16	.429
Grambling State	2	–	12	.143	4	–	24	.143
Prairie View A&M	0	–	14	.000	0	–	28	.000
† 1992 SWAC tournament winner Rankings from AP Poll

The 1992 SWAC men's basketball tournament was held February 27–29, 1992, at the Riverside Centroplex in Baton Rouge, Louisiana. Mississippi Valley State defeated Southern, 85–77 in the championship game. The Delta Devils received the conference's automatic bid to the 1992 NCAA tournament as No. 16 seed in the Southeast Region.

== Bracket and results ==
Quarterfinals; February 27
1	Mississippi Valley State	112
8	Prairie View A&M	79
4	Alcorn State	88
5	Alabama State	84
3	Southern	114
6	Jackson State	101
2	Texas Southern	103
7	Grambling State	71

Semifinals; February 28
1	Mississippi Valley State	76
4	Alcorn State	72
3	Southern	94
2	Texas Southern	90

Final; February 29
1	Mississippi Valley State	85
3	Southern	77
