= Davey Whitney =

Biographical details
- Born: January 8, 1930; Midway, Kentucky, U.S.
- Died: May 10, 2015 (aged 85); Biloxi, Mississippi, U.S.

Playing career
- 1948–1952: Kentucky State
- Position: Guard

Coaching career (HC unless noted)
- 1954–1964: Burt HS (TN)
- 1964–1969: Texas Southern
- 1969–1989: Alcorn A&M / Alcorn State
- 1989–1994: Wichita Falls Texans (asst.)
- 1994: Mississippi Coast Gamblers (asst.)
- 1996–2003: Alcorn State

Head coaching record
- Overall: 562–364 (college)
- Tournaments: 3–6 (NCAA Division I); 10–5 (NAIA); 1–2 (NIT)

Accomplishments and honors

Championships
- 12 SWAC regular season (1973, 1976, 1979–1982, 1984–1986, 1999, 2000, 2002); 6 SWAC tournament (1980, 1982–1984, 1999, 2002)

Awards
- 3× SWAC Coach of the Year (1999, 2000, 2002)
- College Basketball Hall of Fame; Inducted in 2010

Baseball career
- Infielder

Negro league baseball debut
- 1952, for the Kansas City Monarchs

Last appearance
- 1954, for the Kansas City Monarchs

Teams
- Kansas City Monarchs (1952–1954)

Davey Lee Whitney Sr. (January 8, 1930 – May 10, 2015), also known as "the Wiz", was an American college basketball coach and the head basketball coach at Texas Southern University from 1964 to 1969 and Alcorn State University from 1969 to 1989 and 1996 to 2003. He amassed a total record of 566 wins and 356 losses in 33 seasons of coaching at both institutions.

== Early life ==
Davey Lee Whitney Sr. was born in Midway, Kentucky, and attended Paul Laurence Dunbar High School in Lexington while living with friends. At Dunbar, Whitney played at guard on the basketball team and led his school to the 1947 and 1948 tournaments of the Kentucky High School Athletic League, the state's black high school league, and the 1948 league title.

He attended Kentucky State University and graduated in 1952. At Kentucky State, Whitney lettered in basketball, baseball, football, and track. After college, Whitney started out playing Negro American League baseball for the Kansas City Monarchs as shortstop and third baseman, from 1952 to 1954.

== Coaching career ==
Whitney began his coaching career in 1954 as varsity basketball head coach at Burt High School in Clarksville, Tennessee. In ten seasons, Whitney led Burt to over 200 victories and the 1961 National Negro High School Basketball Championship. He had his first collegiate job as head coach of Texas Southern University in 1964, but had only one winning season in five years. In 1969, he moved on to Alcorn A&M (which became Alcorn State in 1974), which had the reputation as a football school in the Southwestern Athletic Conference (SWAC).

Mainly recruiting local talent, Whitney was instrumental in making the Alcorn State men's basketball program a force in the SWAC during the 1970s and 1980s, with nine SWAC regular season titles. He led the Braves to the 1974 NAIA Division I men's basketball tournament championship game, the Braves' deepest postseason run to date. Two years after the Braves followed the SWAC to Division I, his Braves advanced to the second round of the 1979 National Invitation Tournament following an upset of Mississippi State in the first round.

In 1980, Alcorn State became the first HBCU to win a game in the NCAA Men's Division I Basketball Championship, after beating South Alabama in the first round. During his time at Alcorn, Whitney earned the nickname "The Wiz".

In 1989, Alcorn State fired Whitney after three straight losing seasons in which they only won 18 games total. Whitney later became an assistant coach for the Wichita Falls Texans of the Continental Basketball Association and was part of the Texans' 1991 championship team. He later was an assistant for the Mississippi Coast Gamblers of the United States Basketball League. He returned to Alcorn State in 1996, taking over a program that had tallied only one winning season since his departure. Within three years, he had the Braves back in the NCAA Tournament. He retired for good in 2003.

Whitney was known as a stern taskmaster, and his teams were a reflection of his hard-nosed personality. They were known for strong rebounding and tenacious defense. His 1998–99 team, for instance, was eighth in the nation in rebounding and gave up only 66.7 points per game.

Whitney set many records during his career at Alcorn, establishing himself as the second winningest coach in HBCU college basketball history behind the late Clarence "Big House" Gaines, who coached at Winston-Salem State University. He also owns the only postseason wins (NCAA and NIT) in Alcorn's history.

Whitney returned to Alcorn State two years after the Braves' home arena had been renamed the Davey Whitney Complex in his honor. He is thus one of the few Division I coaches to coach in an arena named after him.

He was inducted into the National Collegiate Basketball Hall of Fame in 2010.

== Head coaching record ==
Record table
Season	Team	Overall	Conference	Standing	Postseason
Texas Southern Tigers (Southwestern Athletic Conference) (1964–1969)
1964–65	Texas Southern	6–20	4–10	T–6th	
1965–66	Texas Southern	16–11	9–5	T–3rd	
1966–67	Texas Southern	10–16	4–10	7th	
1967–68	Texas Southern	11–12	5–9	6th	
1968–69	Texas Southern	11–13	4–10	7th	
Texas Southern:		54–72	26–44		
Alcorn A&M / Alcorn State Braves (Southwestern Athletic Conference) (1969–1989)
1969–70	Alcorn A&M	16–9	9–5	3rd	
1970–71	Alcorn A&M	16–9	8–4	T–3rd	
1971–72	Alcorn A&M	14–10	8–4	3rd	
1972–73	Alcorn A&M	24–5	10–2	1st	NAIA First Round
1973–74	Alcorn State	29–6	10–2	2nd	NAIA Runner-Up
1974–75	Alcorn State	25–10	8–4	2nd	NAIA Semifinals
1975–76	Alcorn State	27–4	10–2	1st	NAIA First Round
1976–77	Alcorn State	26–9	5–7	6th	NAIA Elite Eight
1977–78	Alcorn State	21–7	8–4	3rd	
1978–79	Alcorn State	28–1	12–0	1st	NIT Second Round
1979–80	Alcorn State	28–2	12–0	1st	NCAA Division I Second Round
1980–81	Alcorn State	17–12	8–4	T–1st	
1981–82	Alcorn State	22–8	10–2	T–1st	NCAA Division I First Round
1982–83	Alcorn State	22–10	10–4	3rd	NCAA Division I First Round
1983–84	Alcorn State	21–10	11–3	T–1st	NCAA Division I First Round
1984–85	Alcorn State	23–7	13–1	1st	NIT First Round
1985–86	Alcorn State	16–13	11–3	T–1st	
1986–87	Alcorn State	5–23	3–11	7th	
1987–88	Alcorn State	8–21	5–9	T–5th	
1988–89	Alcorn State	5–23	4–10	7th	
Alcorn State Braves (Southwestern Athletic Conference) (1996–2003)
1996–97	Alcorn State	11–17	8–6	3rd	
1997–98	Alcorn State	12–15	8–8	6th	
1998–99	Alcorn State	23–7	14–2	1st	NCAA Division I First Round
1999–00	Alcorn State	19–10	15–3	1st	
2000–01	Alcorn State	15–15	13–5	T–3rd	
2001–02	Alcorn State	21–10	16–2	1st	NCAA Division I Opening Round
2002–03	Alcorn State	14–19	10–8	5th	
Alcorn State:		508–292	259–115		
Total:		562–364			
National champion Postseason invitational champion Conference regular season champion Conference regular season and conference tournament champion Division regular season champion Division regular season and conference tournament champion Conference tournament champion

== Death ==
Whitney died at his home in Biloxi, Mississippi, on May 10, 2015, at the age of 85.
