= 1981–82 Alcorn State Braves basketball team =

American college basketball season

1981–82 Alcorn State Braves basketball

SWAC tournament champions

NCAA tournament
- Conference: Southwestern Athletic Conference
- Record: 22–8 (10–2 SWAC)
- Head coach: Davey Whitney (13th season)
- Home arena: Physical Education Complex

1981–82 SWAC men's basketball standings
	Conf.				Overall
Team	W		L	PCT	W		L	PCT
Alcorn State †	10	–	2	.833	22	–	8	.733
Jackson State	10	–	2	.833	19	–	9	.679
Texas Southern	8	–	4	.667	21	–	8	.724
Grambling State	6	–	6	.500	12	–	17	.414
Mississippi Valley State	4	–	8	.333	6	–	20	.231
Southern	3	–	9	.250	7	–	18	.280
Prairie View A&M	1	–	11	.083	2	–	23	.080
† 1982 SWAC tournament winner Rankings from AP Poll

The 1981–82 Alcorn State Braves basketball team represented Alcorn State University during the 1981–82 NCAA Division I men's basketball season. The Braves, led by head coach Davey Whitney, played their home games at the Davey Whitney Complex and were members of the Southwestern Athletic Conference. They finished the season 22–8, 10–2 in SWAC. They won the SWAC tournament to receive an automatic bid to the NCAA tournament as a No. 11 seed in the Midwest region. The Braves fell in the first round to No. 6 seed Houston, 94–84.

== Roster ==
1981–82 Alcorn State Braves men's basketball team
Players	Coaches
Pos. / # / Name / Height / Weight / Year / Hometown; G / / Michael Phelps / 6 ft 4 in (1.93 m) / 180 lb (82 kg) / Fr / Vicksburg / Vicksburg, Mississippi	Head coach: Davey Whitney; Assistant coach(es) Legend: (C) Team captain; (S) Suspended; (I) Ineligible; (W) Walk-on; Injured; Current redshirt

== Schedule and results ==
Date time, TV	Rank^{#}	Opponent^{#}	Result	Record	Site (attendance) city, state
Regular season
Dec 1, 1981*		at No. 16 Missouri	L 51–82	0–1	Hearnes Center; Columbia, Missouri
Mar 1, 1982*		at North Texas	L 77–83	19–7	Super Pit; Denton, Texas
SWAC tournament
Mar 4, 1982*		vs. Prairie View; Quarterfinals	W 102–69	20–7	F. G. Clark Center; Baton Rouge, Louisiana
Mar 5, 1982*		vs. Texas Southern; Semifinals	W 85–82	21–7	F. G. Clark Center; Baton Rouge, Louisiana
Mar 6, 1982*		vs. Jackson State; Championship game	W 87–77	22–7	F. G. Clark Center; Baton Rouge, Louisiana
NCAA tournament
Mar 11, 1982*	(11 MW)	vs. (6 MW) Houston; First round	L 84–94	22–8	Mabee Center; Tulsa, Oklahoma
*Non-conference game. ^{#}Rankings from AP Poll. (#) Tournament seedings in parentheses. MW=Midwest. All times are in Central Time.
