= Rob Lanier =

American basketball coach (born 1968)

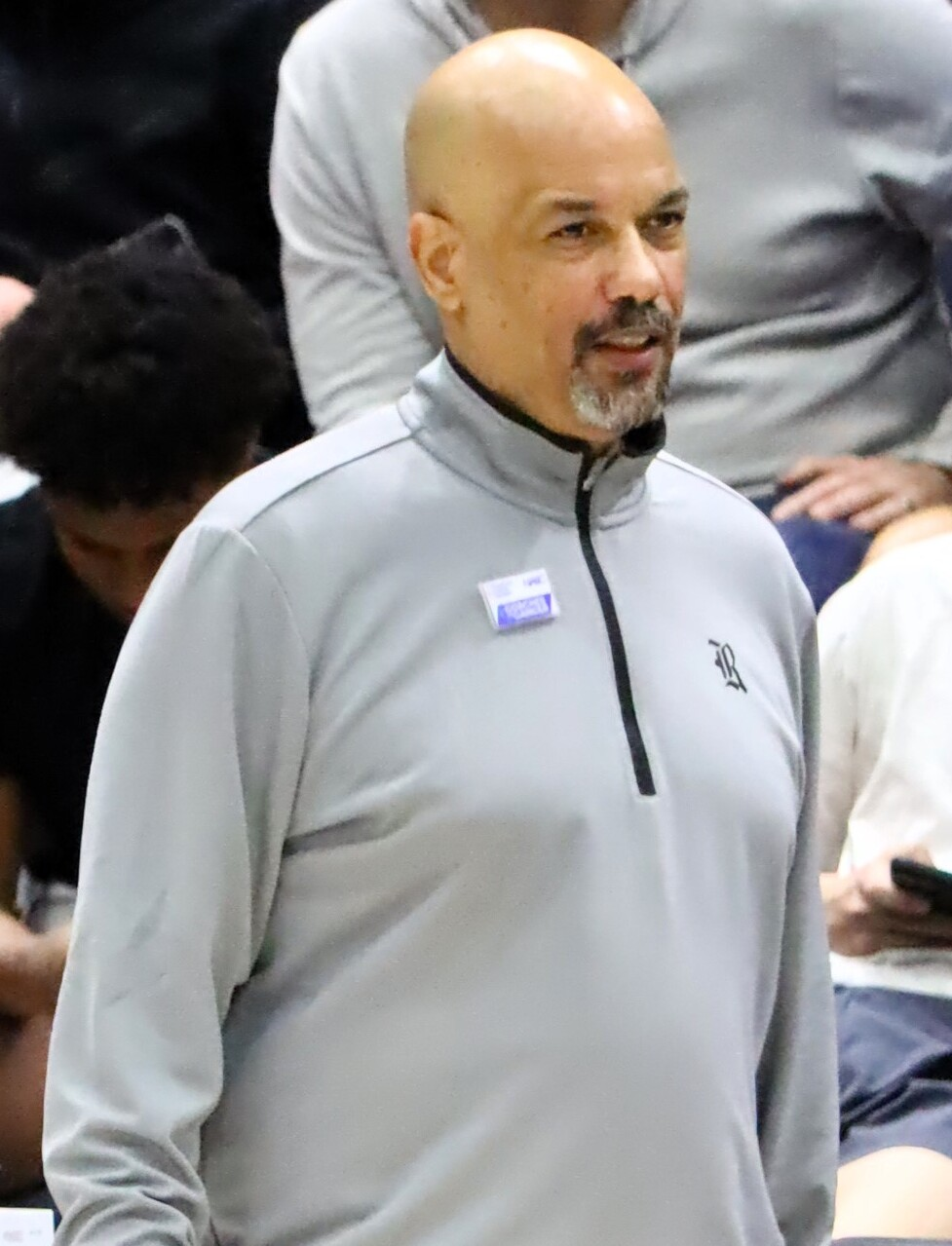
- Lanier in 2025

Current position
- Title: Head coach
- Team: Rice
- Conference: The American
- Record: 28–39 (.418)

Biographical details
- Born: July 24, 1968 (age 58); New York City, New York, U.S.

Playing career
- 1986–1990: St. Bonaventure

Coaching career (HC unless noted)
- 1990–1992: Niagara (assistant)
- 1992–1997: St. Bonaventure (assistant)
- 1997–1999: Rutgers (assistant)
- 1999–2001: Texas (assistant)
- 2001–2005: Siena
- 2005–2007: Virginia (assistant)
- 2007–2011: Florida (assistant)
- 2011–2015: Texas (assistant)
- 2015–2019: Tennessee (assistant)
- 2019–2022: Georgia State
- 2022–2024: SMU
- 2024–present: Rice

Head coaching record
- Overall: 169–174 (.493)
- Tournaments: 1–2 (NCAA Division I); 2–2 (NIT)

Accomplishments and honors

Championships
- MAAC tournament (2002); Sun Belt tournament (2022)

Robert A. Lanier (born July 24, 1968) is an American college basketball coach who currently serves as the head men's basketball coach at Rice University. Previously, he was the head coach at Southern Methodist University. He also served as the head coach at Georgia State from 2019 to 2022 and Siena from 2001 to 2005.

== Playing career ==
Lanier played his college basketball at St. Bonaventure, where he scored 868 career points and was named to the Atlantic 10 Conference All-Freshman Team.

== Coaching career ==
Lanier's first coaching stop was at Niagara as an assistant for two seasons before moving back to an assistant coaching spot at his alma mater. After a two-year stop at Rutgers, Lanier joined Rick Barnes's staff at Texas. In 2001, he was hired for his first head coaching job at Siena College where in his first season at the helm, he guided the Saints to a MAAC conference tournament championship and spot in the 2002 NCAA tournament where they defeated Alcorn State in the opening round, and lost to eventual national champion Maryland in the first round. He also led Siena to a 2003 NIT appearance where the Saints advanced to the third round with wins over Western Michigan and Villanova. After four seasons and a 58–70 record, Lanier was fired by Siena.

Lanier joined the coaching staffs at Virginia and Florida before reuniting with Barnes at both Texas and Tennessee. On April 5, 2019, Lanier was named the head coach at Georgia State University, replacing Ron Hunter who accepted the head coaching position at Tulane.

Lanier went 53–30 in 3 seasons at Georgia State, until he accepted the head coach position at Southern Methodist University on March 27, 2022.

On March 21, 2024, SMU fired Lanier. Several days later, Lanier was hired by Rice University.

== Personal ==
Lanier is the cousin of former NBA player and Naismith Memorial Basketball Hall of Fame member Bob Lanier. Lanier's son Emory played basketball for Southern Methodist University.

== Head coaching record ==
Record table
Season	Team	Overall	Conference	Standing	Postseason
Siena Saints (Metro Atlantic Athletic Conference) (2001–2005)
2001–02	Siena	17–19	9–9	7th	NCAA Division I Round of 64
2002–03	Siena	21–11	12–6	3rd	NIT Second Round
2003–04	Siena	14–16	9–9	6th	
2004–05	Siena	6–24	4–14	10th	
Siena:		58–70 (.453)	34–38 (.472)		
Georgia State Panthers (Sun Belt Conference) (2019–2022)
2019–20	Georgia State	19–13	12–8	T–4th	
2020–21	Georgia State	16–6	8–4	1st (East)	
2021–22	Georgia State	18–11	9–5	3rd	NCAA Division I Round of 64
Georgia State:		53–30 (.639)	29–17 (.630)		
SMU Mustangs (American Athletic Conference) (2022–2024)
2022–23	SMU	10–22	5–13	10th	
2023–24	SMU	20–13	11–7	T–5th	NIT First Round
SMU:		30–35 (.462)	16–20 (.444)		
Rice Owls (American Athletic Conference) (2024–present)
2024–25	Rice	13–19	4–14	12th	
2025–26	Rice	13–18	7–11	11th	
2026–27	Rice	2–2	0–0		
Rice:		28–39 (.418)	11–25 (.306)		
Total:		169–174 (.493)			
National champion Postseason invitational champion Conference regular season champion Conference regular season and conference tournament champion Division regular season champion Division regular season and conference tournament champion Conference tournament champion
