= 2002 MAAC men's basketball tournament =

- Classification: Division I
- Season: 2001–02
- Teams: 10
- Site: Pepsi Arena; Albany, New York
- Champions: Siena (2nd title)
- Winning coach: Rob Lanier (1st title)
- MVP: Dwayne Archbold (Siena)

2001–02 MAAC men's basketball standings
| | Conf. | | | | Overall |
| Team | W | | L | PCT | W | | L | PCT |
|---|---|---|---|---|---|---|---|---|
| Rider | 13 | – | 5 | .722 | 17 | – | 11 | .607 |
| Marist | 13 | – | 5 | .722 | 19 | – | 9 | .679 |
| Manhattan | 12 | – | 6 | .667 | 20 | – | 9 | .690 |
| Niagara | 12 | – | 6 | .667 | 18 | – | 14 | .563 |
| Iona | 10 | – | 8 | .556 | 13 | – | 17 | .433 |
| Fairfield | 9 | – | 9 | .500 | 12 | – | 17 | .414 |
| Siena † | 9 | – | 9 | .500 | 17 | – | 19 | .472 |
| Canisius | 5 | – | 13 | .278 | 10 | – | 20 | .333 |
| Loyola (MD) | 4 | – | 14 | .222 | 5 | – | 23 | .179 |
| Saint Peter's | 3 | – | 15 | .167 | 4 | – | 24 | .143 |
† 2002 MAAC tournament winner Rankings from AP Poll

The 2002 MAAC men's basketball tournament was held March 1–4, 2002 at Pepsi Arena in Albany, New York.

Seventh-seeded Siena defeated Niagara in the championship game, 92–77, to win their second MAAC men's basketball tournament.

The Saints received an automatic bid to the 2002 NCAA tournament.

== Format ==
All ten of the conference's members participated in the tournament field. They were seeded based on regular season conference records.

== Bracket ==
First round Friday, March 1
8 | Canisius | 88
9 | Loyola (MD) | 62
7 | Siena | 77
10 | Saint Peter's | 66

Quarterfinals; Saturday, March 2
1 | Rider | 84^{OT}
8 | Canisius | 85
4 | Niagara | 89
5 | Iona | 83
2 | Marist | 76
7 | Siena | 82
3 | Manhattan | 74
6 | Fairfield | 81

Semifinals; Sunday, March 3
8 | Canisius | 60
4 | Niagara | 70
7 | Siena | 83
6 | Fairfield | 63

Championship; Monday, March 4
4 | Niagara | 77
7 | Siena | 92
