= 1996 SWAC men's basketball tournament =

Basketball Tournament March 1991 in Texas

- Classification: Division I
- Season: 1995–96
- Teams: 6
- Site: Joe L. Reed Acadome; Montgomery, Alabama
- Champions: Mississippi Valley State (3rd title)
- Winning coach: Lafayette Stribling (3rd title)

1995–96 SWAC men's basketball standings
| | Conf. | | | | Overall |
| Team | W | | L | PCT | W | | L | PCT |
|---|---|---|---|---|---|---|---|---|
| Mississippi Valley State † | 11 | – | 3 | .786 | 22 | – | 7 | .759 |
| Jackson State | 11 | – | 3 | .786 | 16 | – | 13 | .552 |
| Southern | 9 | – | 5 | .643 | 17 | – | 11 | .607 |
| Texas Southern | 7 | – | 7 | .500 | 11 | – | 15 | .423 |
| Alcorn State | 7 | – | 7 | .500 | 10 | – | 15 | .400 |
| Grambling | 6 | – | 8 | .429 | 12 | – | 16 | .429 |
| Alabama State | 5 | – | 9 | .357 | 9 | – | 18 | .333 |
| Prairie View A&M | 0 | – | 14 | .000 | 4 | – | 23 | .148 |
† 1996 SWAC tournament winner Rankings from AP Poll

The 1996 SWAC men's basketball tournament was held March 7–9, 1996, at the Joe L. Reed Acadome in Montgomery, Alabama. Mississippi Valley State defeated Jackson State, 111–94 in the championship game. The Delta Devils received the conference's automatic bid to the 1996 NCAA tournament as No. 15 seed in the East Region.

== Bracket and results ==
First round March 7
6 | Grambling State | 71
7 | Alabama State | 59
3 | Southern | 107
8 | Prairie View A&M | 81

Semifinals; March 8
1 | Jackson State | 60
6 | Grambling State | 57
3 | Southern | 76
2 | Mississippi Valley State | 83

Final; March 9
1 | Jackson State | 94
2 | Mississippi Valley State | 111
