= 1983–84 Alcorn State Braves basketball team =

American college basketball season

1983–84 Alcorn State Braves basketball

SWAC Regular season champions SWAC tournament champions

NCAA tournament
- Conference: Southwestern Athletic Conference
- Record: 21–10 (11–3 SWAC)
- Head coach: Davey Whitney (15th season)
- Home arena: Physical Education Complex

1983–84 SWAC men's basketball standings
	Conf.				Overall
Team	W		L	PCT	W		L	PCT
Alcorn State †	11	–	3	.786	21	–	10	.677
Alabama State	11	–	3	.786	22	–	6	.786
Southern	10	–	4	.714	16	–	12	.571
Grambling State	7	–	7	.500	17	–	12	.586
Mississippi Valley State	6	–	8	.429	15	–	13	.536
Texas Southern	6	–	8	.429	12	–	17	.414
Jackson State	5	–	9	.357	10	–	18	.357
Prairie View A&M	0	–	14	.000	2	–	26	.071
† 1984 SWAC tournament winner Rankings from AP Poll

The 1983–84 Alcorn State Braves basketball team represented Alcorn State University during the 1983–84 NCAA Division I men's basketball season. The Braves, led by head coach Davey Whitney, played their home games at the Davey Whitney Complex and were members of the Southwestern Athletic Conference. They finished the season 21–10, 11–3 in SWAC play to win the conference regular season. They also won the SWAC tournament to receive an automatic bid to the NCAA tournament as one of two No. 12 seeds in the Midwest region. The Braves defeated Houston Baptist 79–60, and then pushed No. 5 seed Kansas to the brink before falling, 57–56.

== Roster ==
1983–84 Alcorn State Braves men's basketball team
Players	Coaches
Pos. / # / Name / Height / Weight / Year / Hometown; G / / Michael Phelps / 6 ft 4 in (1.93 m) / 180 lb (82 kg) / Jr / Vicksburg / Vicksburg, Mississippi	Head coach: Davey Whitney; Assistant coach(es) Legend: (C) Team captain; (S) Suspended; (I) Ineligible; (W) Walk-on; Injured; Current redshirt

== Schedule and results ==
Date time, TV	Rank^{#}	Opponent^{#}	Result	Record	Site (attendance) city, state
Regular season
Nov ?, 1983*		at Huston–Tillotson	W 116–82	1–0	Physical Education Complex; Lorman, Mississippi
Nov 30, 1983*		at Loyola–Chicago	L 82–86	1–1	Alumni Gym; Chicago, Illinois
Dec ?, 1983*		at Wiley College	W 103–95	2–1	Physical Education Complex; Lorman, Mississippi
Dec 9, 1983*		vs. Mercer	L 101–103	2–2	
Dec 10, 1983*		vs. Columbia	W 80–61	3–2	
Dec ?, 1983*		at Fort Valley State	W 78–75	4–2	Physical Education Complex; Lorman, Mississippi
Dec 16, 1983*		at Illinois-Chicago	L 85–91	4–3	UIC Pavilion; Chicago, Illinois
Dec 20, 1983*		vs. North Texas	W 57–48	5–3	Carver Arena; Peoria, Illinois
Dec 21, 1983*		at Bradley	L 57–69	5–4	Carver Arena; Peoria, Illinois
Dec 30, 1983*		at No. 16 UTEP	L 57–70	5–5	Special Events Center; El Paso, Texas
Jan 7, 1984		at Jackson State	L 58–59	5–6 (0–1)	Williams Assembly Center; Jackson, Mississippi
SWAC tournament
Mar 8, 1984*		vs. Grambling State; Semifinals	W 76–51	15–9	Mississippi Coliseum; Jackson, Mississippi
Mar 9, 1984*		vs. Texas Southern; Championship game	W 78–69	16–9	Mississippi Coliseum; Jackson, Mississippi
NCAA tournament
Mar 13, 1984*	(12 MW)	vs. (12 MW) Houston Baptist; Play-in game	W 79–60	21–9	University of Dayton Arena; Dayton, Ohio
Mar 16, 1984*	(12 MW)	vs. (5 MW) Kansas; First Round	L 56–57	21–10	Bob Devaney Sports Center; Lincoln, Nebraska
*Non-conference game. ^{#}Rankings from AP Poll. (#) Tournament seedings in parentheses. MW=Midwest. All times are in Central Time.
