= 1998–99 Alcorn State Braves basketball team =

American college basketball season

1998–99 Alcorn State Braves basketball

SWAC Regular season champions SWAC tournament champions

NCAA tournament
- Conference: Southwestern Athletic Conference
- Record: 23–7 (14–2 SWAC)
- Head coach: Davey Whitney (23rd season)
- Home arena: Davey Whitney Complex

1998–99 SWAC men's basketball standings
	Conf.				Overall
Team	W		L	PCT	W		L	PCT
Alcorn State †	14	–	2	.875	23	–	7	.767
Southern	13	–	3	.813	21	–	7	.750
Jackson State	11	–	5	.688	16	–	12	.571
Mississippi Valley State	10	–	6	.625	14	–	13	.519
Alabama State	8	–	8	.500	11	–	16	.407
Texas Southern	6	–	10	.375	8	–	19	.296
Grambling State	5	–	11	.313	6	–	21	.222
Prairie View A&M	4	–	12	.250	6	–	21	.222
Arkansas–Pine Bluff	1	–	15	.063	3	–	24	.111
Alabama A&M	0	–	0	–	10	–	17	.370
† 1999 SWAC tournament winner Rankings from AP Poll

The 1998–99 Alcorn State Braves basketball team represented Alcorn State University during the 1998–99 NCAA Division I men's basketball season. The Braves, led by head coach Davey Whitney, played their home games at the Davey Whitney Complex and were members of the Southwestern Athletic Conference. They finished the season 23–7, 14–2 in SWAC play to win the conference regular season. They also won the SWAC tournament to receive an automatic bid to the NCAA tournament – the program's first appearance in 15 seasons. The Braves were defeated by No. 2 seed Stanford, 69–57.

== Roster ==
1998–99 Alcorn State Braves men's basketball team
Players
Coaches

Pos.	#	Name	Height	Weight	Year	Hometown
G		Reuben Stiff	5 ft 11 in (1.8 m)	—	Sr
G		Wallace Harris	6 ft 3 in (1.91 m)	—	Jr
F		Eddrick Wheaton	6 ft 8 in (2.03 m)	—	Sr
F		Marcus Fleming	6 ft 8 in (2.03 m)	—	Fr
C		Walter Harper	6 ft 8 in (2.03 m)	—	Fr

Head coach

- Davey Whitney

Assistant coach(es)

Legend

- (C) Team captain
- (S) Suspended
- (I) Ineligible
- (W) Walk-on
- Injured
- Current redshirt

== Schedule and results ==
Date time, TV	Rank^{#}	Opponent^{#}	Result	Record	Site (attendance) city, state
Regular season
Nov 14, 1998*		at UAB	L 57–70	0–1	Bartow Arena (4,883); Birmingham, Alabama
Dec 2, 1998*		at Illinois State	L 73–86	3–2	Redbird Arena (6,239); Normal, Illinois
Dec 19, 1998*		at Oregon	L 68–78	5–3	McArthur Court; Eugene, Oregon
Dec 21, 1998*		at Wyoming	L 64–101	5–4	Arena-Auditorium; Laramie, Wyoming
SWAC tournament
Mar 3, 1999*		Prairie View A&M; Quarterfinals	W 114–61	21–6	Davey Whitney Complex; Lorman, Mississippi
Mar 5, 1999*		vs. Mississippi Valley State; Semifinals	W 73–61	22–6	F. G. Clark Center; Baton Rouge, Louisiana
Mar 7, 1999*		at Southern; Championship game	W 89–83	23–6	F. G. Clark Center; Baton Rouge, Louisiana
NCAA tournament
Mar 11, 1999*; CBS	(15 W)	vs. (2 W) No. 7 Stanford; First round	L 57–69	23–7	KeyArena; Seattle, Washington
*Non-conference game. ^{#}Rankings from AP Poll. (#) Tournament seedings in parentheses. W=West. All times are in Central Time.
