= 2001–02 Siena Saints men's basketball team =

American college basketball season

2001–02 Siena Saints men's basketball

MAAC tournament champions

NCAA tournament, first round
- Conference: Metro Atlantic Athletic Conference
- Record: 17–19 (9–9 MAC)
- Head coach: Rob Lanier (1st season)
- Home arena: Pepsi Arena

2001–02 MAAC men's basketball standings
	Conf.				Overall
Team	W		L	PCT	W		L	PCT
Rider	13	–	5	.722	17	–	11	.607
Marist	13	–	5	.722	19	–	9	.679
Manhattan	12	–	6	.667	20	–	9	.690
Niagara	12	–	6	.667	18	–	14	.563
Iona	10	–	8	.556	13	–	17	.433
Fairfield	9	–	9	.500	12	–	17	.414
Siena †	9	–	9	.500	17	–	19	.472
Canisius	5	–	13	.278	10	–	20	.333
Loyola (MD)	4	–	14	.222	5	–	23	.179
Saint Peter's	3	–	15	.167	4	–	24	.143
† 2002 MAAC tournament winner Rankings from AP Poll

The 2001–02 Siena Saints men's basketball team represented Siena College in the 2001–02 college basketball season. This was head coach Rob Lanier's first season at Siena. The Saints competed in the Metro Atlantic Athletic Conference (MAAC) and played their home games at Pepsi Arena in Albany, New York. They finished the season 17–19, 9–9 in MAAC play to end up seventh in the regular season standings. Sitting with a 12–18 record, but buoyed by the advantage of playing on their home court, the team won four games in four days to capture the 2002 MAAC men's basketball tournament and earn the conference's automatic bid to the 2002 NCAA Division I men's basketball tournament. The Saints received one of two 16 seeds in the East region. Siena won the play-in game over Alcorn State before being defeated by No. 1 seed and eventual National champion Maryland in the opening round.

== Roster ==
2001–02 Siena Saints men's basketball team
Players	Coaches
Pos. / # / Name / Height / Weight / Year / Hometown; G / 24 / Dwayne Archbold / 6 ft 6 in (1.98 m) / 190 lb (86 kg) / Sr / Brooklyn, New York	Head coach: Rob Lanier; Assistant coach(es) Legend: (C) Team captain; (S) Suspended; (I) Ineligible; (W) Walk-on; Injured; Current redshirt; Roster

== Schedule and results ==
- All times are Eastern

Date time, TV	Rank^{#}	Opponent^{#}	Result	Record	Site (attendance) city, state
Regular season
Nov 16, 2001*		at Providence	L 54–79	0–1	Dunkin Donuts Center (6,786); Providence, Rhode Island
Nov 19, 2001*		vs. Austin Peay; Las Vegas Invitational	W 62–44	1–1	Valley High School (350); Las Vegas, Nevada
Nov 20, 2001*		vs. No. 15 Oklahoma State; Las Vegas Invitational	L 64–82	1–2	Valley High School (580); Las Vegas, Nevada
Nov 21, 2001*		vs. Northwestern State; Las Vegas Invitational	L 91–99 ^{2OT}	1–3	Valley High School (325); Las Vegas, Nevada
Feb 23, 2002		Marist	L 57–60	12–18 (9–9)	Pepsi Arena (9,323); Albany, New York
MAAC tournament
Mar 1, 2002*		Saint Peter's; First round	W 77–66	13–18	Pepsi Arena (3,041); Albany, New York
Mar 2, 2002*		Marist; Quarterfinals	W 82–76	14–18	Pepsi Arena (7,420); Albany, New York
Mar 3, 2002*		Fairfield; Semifinals	W 83–63	15–18	Pepsi Arena (5,901); Albany, New York
Mar 4, 2002*		Niagara; Championship game	W 92–77	16–18	Pepsi Arena (8,985); Albany, New York
NCAA tournament
Mar 12, 2002*	(16 E)	vs. (16 E) Alcorn State; Play-in game	W 81–77	17–18	University of Dayton Arena (8,681); Dayton, Ohio
Mar 15, 2002*	(16 E)	vs. (1 E) No. 4 Maryland; First round	L 70–85	17–19	Verizon Center (18,770); Washington, D.C.
*Non-conference game. ^{#}Rankings from AP Poll. (#) Tournament seedings in parentheses.
