= Grambling State Tigers =

Collegiate sports club in the United States

- University: Grambling State University
- Nickname: Tigers
- NCAA: Division I (FCS)
- Conference: SWAC
- Athletic director: Trayvean Scott
- Location: Grambling, Louisiana
- Football stadium: Eddie G. Robinson Memorial Stadium
- Basketball arena: Fredrick C. Hobdy Assembly Center
- Baseball stadium: Wilbert Ellis Field at Ralph Waldo Emerson Jones Park
- Softball stadium: GSU Softball Complex
- Soccer stadium: GSU Soccer Complex
- Volleyball arena: Memorial Gymnasium
- Colors: Black, gold, and red
- Mascot: Tiger
- Website: gsutigers.com

The Grambling State Tigers and Lady Tigers represent Grambling State University in NCAA intercollegiate athletics. Grambling's sports teams participate in Division I (I-FCS for football) as a member of the Southwestern Athletic Conference (SWAC).

== Sports sponsored ==
Men's sports	Women's sports
Baseball	Basketball
Basketball	Bowling
Cross country	Cross country
Football	Soccer
Track and field^{†}	Softball
	Tennis
	Track and field^{†}
	Volleyball
† – Track and field includes both indoor and outdoor.

=== Baseball ===
==== Notable players ====
- Tommie Agee
- Matt Alexander
- Courtney Duncan
- Ralph Garr
- Johnny Jeter
- Lenny Webster
- Gerald Williams
- Gary Eave

=== Men's basketball ===
The Grambling State Tigers won the NAIA National championship tournament in 1961, beating Georgetown College (Ky.). The victory made Grambling State the first and only college basketball program in the state to win a national basketball championship. In the following years, the Tigers made it to the NAIA Final Four, and placed 3rd in 1963, and 1966, defeating Fort Hays State (Kan.) and Norfolk State (Va.) respectively. The Tigers appeared in the NAIA National Tournament eight times from 1959 to 1971, with a total NAIA National Tournament record of 19–7. Former NBA star Charles Hardnett played for the National Championship Tiger team. The team reached their first NCAA Division I men's basketball tournament in 2024 after winning the SWAC Tournament Championship. In 2013, the Tigers went 0–28, with only one single-digit loss (an 8-point loss to Alabama A&M in the SWAC tournament). Grambling State's most popular and highest attended regular season basketball rivalries are against the Southern Jaguars and Prairie View A&M Panthers.

=== Football ===
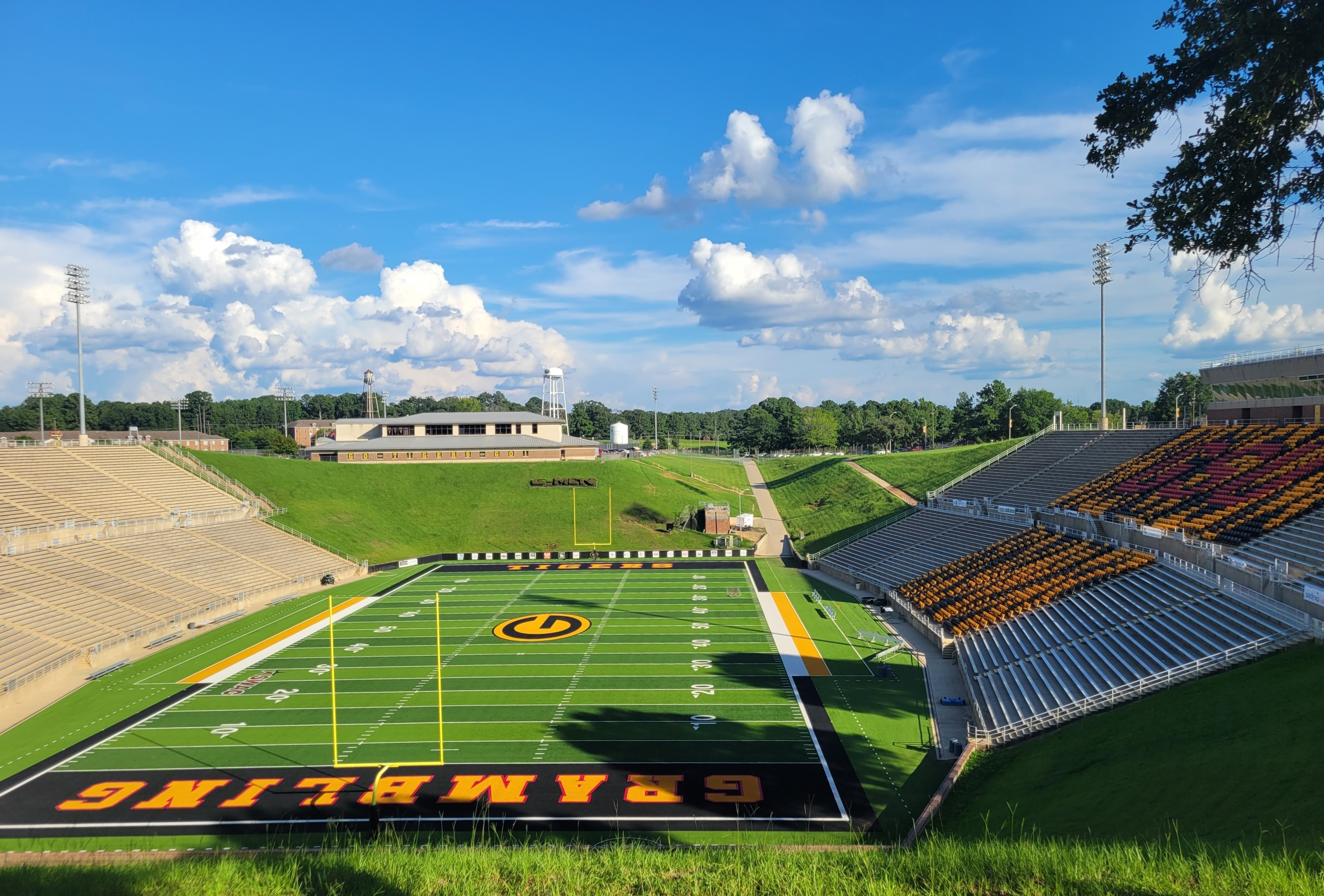
Eddie G. Robinson Memorial Stadium, home to the football team

Grambling State plays its arch rival Southern University in the annual Bayou Classic, which is hosted at the Louisiana Superdome in New Orleans, Louisiana over Thanksgiving weekend and broadcast nationally on NBCSN.

GSU also plays in the annual State Fair Classic against the Prairie View A&M Panthers at the Cotton Bowl, in Fair Park, in Dallas, Texas.

Former football coach Eddie Robinson previously held the NCAA record for most career wins as a head coach at an NCAA division I school.

During Robinson's 55-year coaching career, the university gained a national reputation because of the large number of athletes who joined the professional ranks in football.

After Robinson's retirement in 1997, former GSU standout and NFL Super Bowl XXII MVP Doug Williams took over the reins of the university's football program.

Grambling has won fourteen black college national championships, tied for second most in the country (Robinson's teams won nine of those championships).

The 1981 TV movie Grambling's White Tiger set in 1967, tells the true story of Jim Gregory, the first white Quarterback at Grambling.

In October 2013, citing health hazards within the Grambling State athletic facilities and team mismanagement in a letter to the administration, the Grambling State football team refused to play their October 19 game against Jackson St., forfeiting the match up, resulting in a loss. The NCAA would later go on to announce the ruling on the game was officially declared a no contest. The Tigers would return for their very next game a week later against Texas Southern.

In 2017, Grambling State completed a few million dollars' worth of renovations to the field and scoreboard.

==== Notable players ====
Pro Football Hall of Fame members

- Willie Brown
- Buck Buchanan
- Willie Davis
- Charlie Joiner

== Traditions ==
Grambling State's colors are black and gold, with red as a tertiary color symbolizing the blood of people of African descent. The school's mascot is the Tiger. Grambling State's male athletes are traditionally referred to as "G-Men".

== See also ==
- List of NCAA Division I institutions
- Honda Battle of the Bands
