= Memorial Gymnasium (Grambling State) =

Multi-purpose arena in Grambling, Louisiana

Memorial Gym
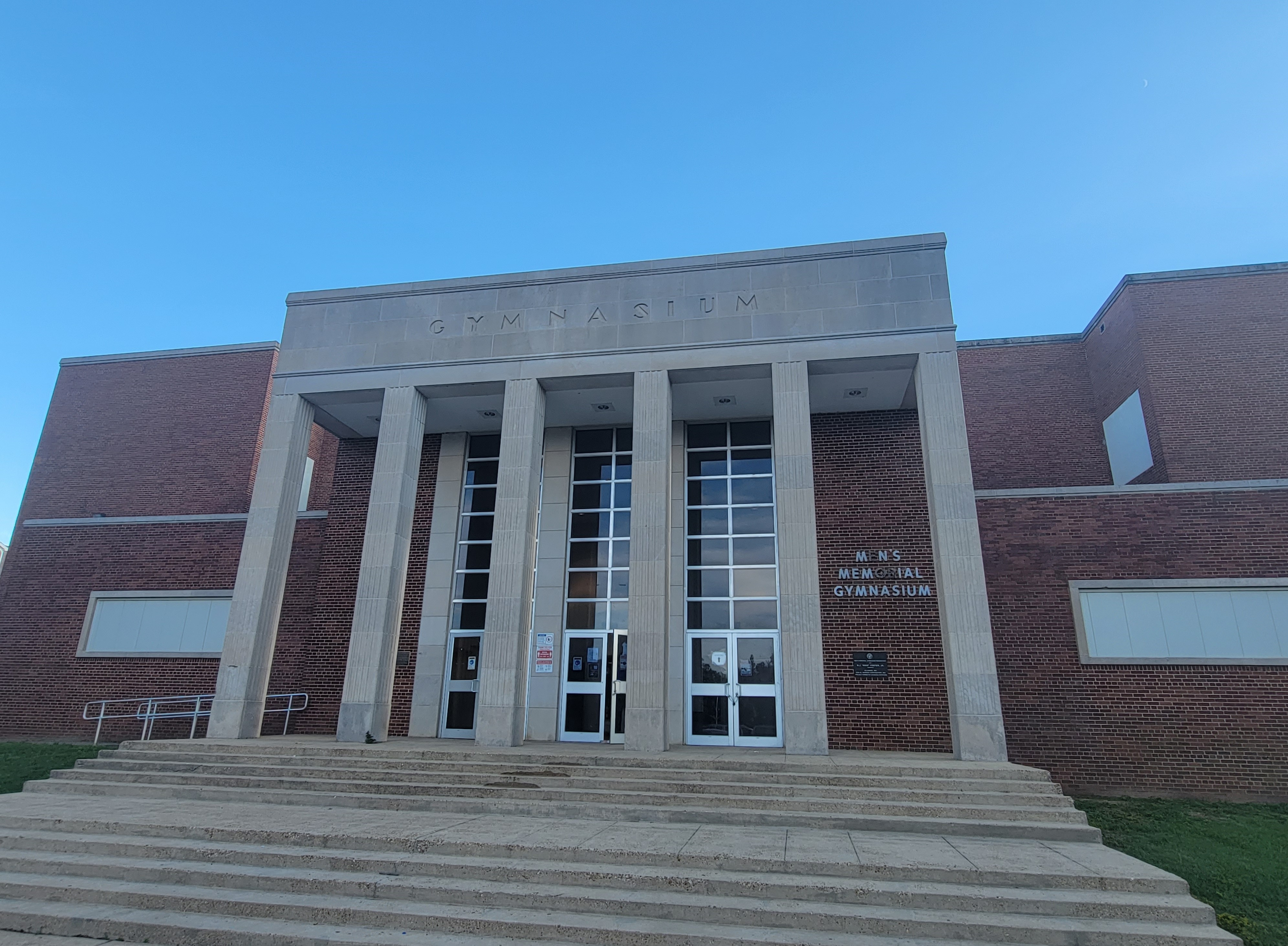
- Interactive map of Memorial Gym
- Location: Grambling, Louisiana
- Coordinates: 32.524187°N 92.712432°W
- Owner: Grambling State University
- Operator: Grambling State University
- Capacity: 2,200

Construction
- Opened: 1970

Tenant
- Grambling State Tigers (volleyball)

Memorial Gym is a 2,200-seat multi-purpose arena in Grambling, Louisiana. It is home to the Grambling State University Tigers volleyball team. It was the former home of the men's and women's basketball teams.
