= Lafayette Stribling =

American basketball coach (1934–2021)

- Stribling in 2018

Biographical details
- Born: June 1, 1934
- Died: October 30, 2021 (aged 87)

Coaching career (HC unless noted)
- 1983–2005: Mississippi Valley State
- 2005–2012: Tougaloo

Head coaching record
- Overall: 442–367 (.546)
- Tournaments: 0–3 (NCAA); 2–3 (NAIA)

Accomplishments and honors

Championships
- 4 SWAC regular season (1992, 1996, 1997, 2004); 3 SWAC tournament (1986, 1992, 1996)

Awards
- 3× SWAC Coach of the Year (1992, 1997, 2004)

Lafayette Stribling (June 1, 1934 – October 30, 2021) was an American basketball coach who coached 55 years at the high school level and college level. Stribling had an overall record of 442–367 at Mississippi Valley State University and Tougaloo College (315–307 at MVSU, 127–60 at Tougaloo).

Stribling led Mississippi Valley State as a 16 seed to a near upset of number one seed Duke in the 1986 NCAA tournament before falling 85–78.

During his tenure at Tougaloo, Stribling led the "Super 7" (because there were only 7 players on the team) to a 16–2 Gulf Coast Athletic Conference (GCAC) record and a 28–5 record overall. Stribling and his Super 7 won the GCAC regular and tournament titles and finished in the "Sweet 16" of the NAIA tournament.

Stribling died on October 30, 2021, at the age of 87.
