= Mississippi Valley State Delta Devils basketball =

Basketball program representing Mississippi Valley State University

| 2026–27 Mississippi Valley State Delta Devils basketball team |
- University: Mississippi Valley State University
- First season: 1961–62; 65 years ago
- Head coach: Mike Davis; 1st season, 0–0 (–)
- Location: Itta Bena, Mississippi
- Arena: Harrison HPER Complex (capacity: 5,000)
- NCAA division: Division I
- Conference: SWAC
- Nickname: Delta Devils
- Colors: Forest green and white

NCAA Division I tournament appearances
- 1986, 1992, 1996, 2008, 2012

Conference tournament champions
- 1986, 1992, 1996, 2008, 2012

Conference regular-season champions
- 1992, 1996, 1997, 2004, 2007, 2012

Uniforms
| Home | Away |

The Mississippi Valley State Delta Devils basketball team represents Mississippi Valley State University in Itta Bena, Mississippi, in NCAA Division I competition. The school's team competes in the Southwestern Athletic Conference and plays home games in the Harrison HPER Complex.

The Delta Devils are currently coached by Mike Davis.

== Postseason results ==
=== NCAA tournament results ===
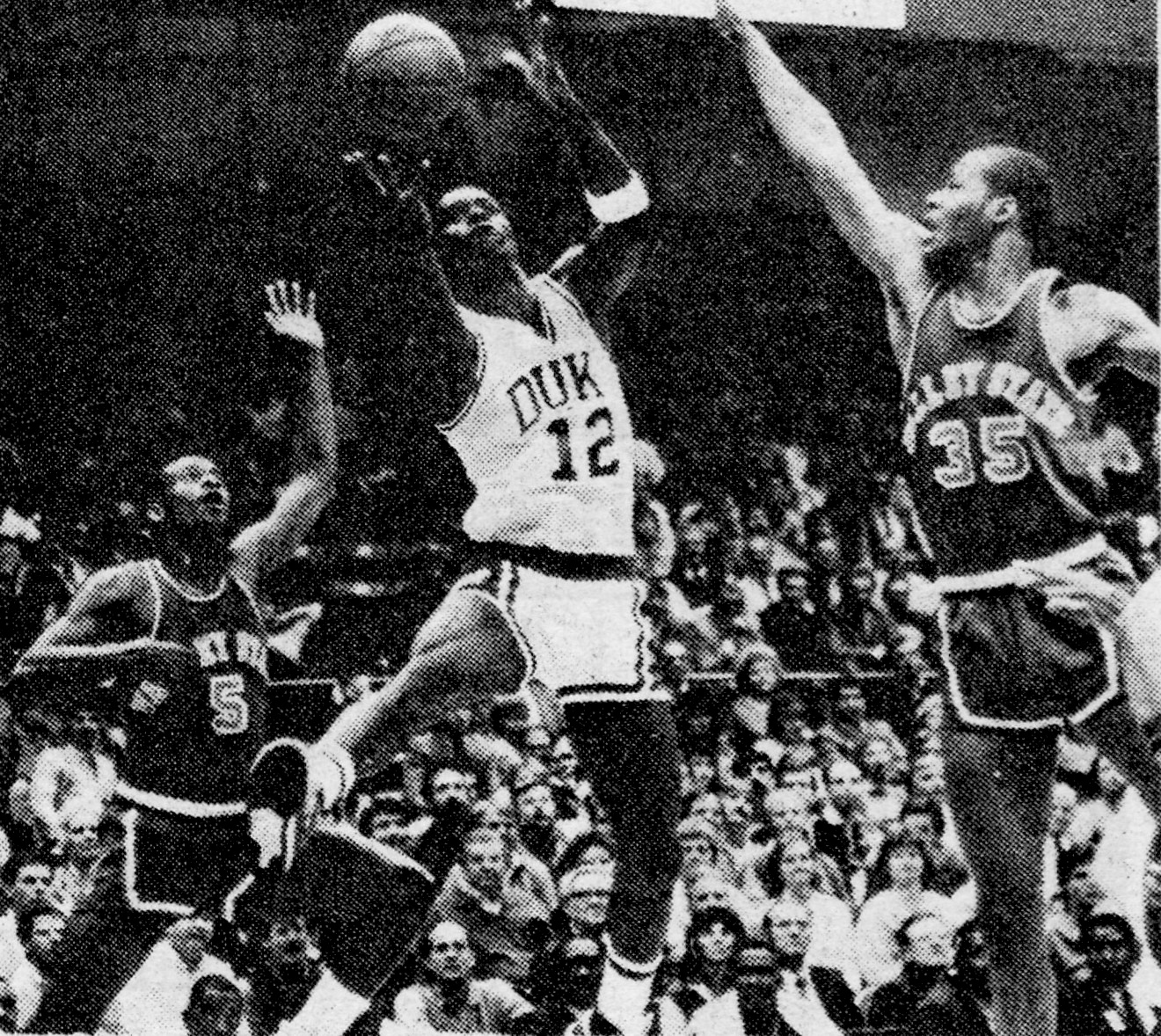
Nate Kilbert (left) and Joe McKinley defend against Duke's David Henderson in the 1986 NCAA tournament.

The Delta Devils have appeared in five NCAA tournaments. Their combined record is 0–5.

| Year | Seed | Round | Opponent | Result |
|---|---|---|---|---|
| 1986 | 16 | First Round | (1) Duke | L 78–85 |
| 1992 | 16 | First Round | (1) Ohio State | L 56–83 |
| 1996 | 15 | First Round | (2) Georgetown | L 56–93 |
| 2008 | 16 | First Round | (1) UCLA | L 29–70 |
| 2012 | 16 | First Four | (16) Western Kentucky | L 58–59 |

=== NIT results ===
The Delta Devils have appeared in one National Invitation Tournament (NIT). Their record is 0–1.

| Year | Round | Opponent | Result |
|---|---|---|---|
| 2007 | First Round | Mississippi State | L 63–82 |

== Year-by-year results ==
Record table
| Season | Team | Overall | Conference | Standing | Postseason |
|---|---|---|---|---|---|
Andrew Jackson (SWAC) (1973–1974)
| 1973–74 | Mississippi Valley State | 8–16 | 3–9 | | |
| Andrew Jackson: | | 8–16 | 3–9 | | |
Pop Gaines (SWAC) (1974–1982)
| 1974–75 | Mississippi Valley State | 15–14 | 4–8 | | |
| 1975–76 | Mississippi Valley State | 12–12 | 5–7 | | |
| 1976–77 | Mississippi Valley State | 13–10 | 6–5 | | |
| 1977–78 | Mississippi Valley State | 16–19 | 4–8 | | NAIA Tournament 1st round |
| 1978–79 | Mississippi Valley State | 15–16 | 5–7 | | |
| 1979–80 | Mississippi Valley State | 3–24 (Note: First season considered as a major program.) | 2–10 | | |
| 1980–81 | Mississippi Valley State | 11–16 | 4–8 | | |
| 1981–82 | Mississippi Valley State | 6–20 | 4–8 | | |
| Pop Gaines: | | 20–60 (Note: Record under MVSU as a major program.) | 10–26 | | |
Jerry Lewis (SWAC) (1982–1983)
| 1982–83 | Mississippi Valley State | 10–16 | 6–8 | | |
| Jerry Lewis: | | 10–16 | 6–8 | | |
Lafayette Stribling (SWAC) (1983–2005)
| 1983–84 | Mississippi Valley State | 15–13 | 6–8 | | |
| 1984–85 | Mississippi Valley State | 18–11 | 7–7 | | |
| 1985–86 | Mississippi Valley State | 20–11 | 10–4 | 3rd | NCAA Tournament First Round |
| Lafayette Stribling: | | 315–307 | 0–0 | | |
| Total: | | 0–0 | | | |
National champion Postseason invitational champion Conference regular season champion Conference regular season and conference tournament champion Division regular season champion Division regular season and conference tournament champion Conference tournament champion

== Delta Devils in the NBA ==
- Alphonso Ford
