= 1982–83 Los Angeles Lakers season =

NBA professional basketball team season

- Conference champions
- Division champions
- Head coach: Pat Riley
- General manager: Jerry West
- Owner: Jerry Buss
- Arena: The Forum

Results
- Record: 58–24 (.707)
- Place: Division: 1st (Pacific); Conference: 1st (Western)
- Playoff finish: NBA Finals (lost to 76ers 0–4)
- Stats at Basketball Reference

Local media
- Television: KHJ
- Radio: AM 570 KLAC

The 1982–83 NBA season was the Lakers' 35th season in the NBA and the 23rd season in Los Angeles. The Lakers were attempting to become the first team since the Boston Celtics in 1969 to repeat as NBA Champions. However, on April 10, 1983, rookie and number one pick in the 1982 draft James Worthy injured his leg while attempting a putback in a home loss against Phoenix, ending his season. Even without Worthy for the playoffs, the Lakers made it to the NBA Finals, only to be swept in four games by the Julius Erving and Moses Malone led Philadelphia 76ers.

This was Pat Riley's first full season as Lakers head coach. Former Lakers star guard and coach Jerry West started his long and successful tenure as general manager. West's predecessor as coach and GM, Bill Sharman, was named team president.

== NBA draft ==
The Lakers were the defending league champions, which normally results in a low draft position, but the team had the top pick in the Draft thanks to a trade made years earlier. On February 15, 1980, the Lakers had sent Don Ford and their top pick in the 1980 NBA Draft (who turned out to be Chad Kinch) to the Cleveland Cavaliers in exchange for Butch Lee and the Cavs' top pick in the 1982 NBA Draft. Prior to the implementation of the NBA draft lottery in 1985, the teams with the two worst records from the previous season would flip a coin flip for the top pick. Cleveland finished last in 1981–82, and the Lakers won the coin flip with the San Diego Clippers.

Round	Pick	Player	Position	Nationality	School/Club team
1	1	James Worthy	Forward	United States	North Carolina

== Roster ==
1982–83 Los Angeles Lakers roster
Players

Pos.	No.	Player	Height	Weight	DOB	From
C	33	Kareem Abdul-Jabbar	7 ft 2 in (2.18 m)	225 lb (102 kg)	1947-04-16	UCLA
G	35	Billy Ray Bates	6 ft 4 in (1.93 m)	210 lb (95 kg)	1956-05-31	Texas
G	21	Michael Cooper	6 ft 5 in (1.96 m)	170 lb (77 kg)	1956-04-15	New Mexico
G	34	Clay Johnson	6 ft 4 in (1.93 m)	175 lb (79 kg)	1956-07-18	Missouri
G	32	Magic Johnson	6 ft 9 in (2.06 m)	215 lb (98 kg)	1959-08-14	Michigan State
F	13	Dwight Jones	6 ft 10 in (2.08 m)	210 lb (95 kg)	1952-02-27	Houston
G	15	Eddie Jordan	6 ft 1 in (1.85 m)	170 lb (77 kg)	1955-01-29	Rutgers
F	54	Mark Landsberger	6 ft 8 in (2.03 m)	215 lb (98 kg)	1955-05-21	Arizona State
C	11	Bob McAdoo	6 ft 9 in (2.06 m)	210 lb (95 kg)	1951-09-25	North Carolina
F	40	Mike McGee	6 ft 5 in (1.96 m)	190 lb (86 kg)	1959-07-29	Michigan
F	50	Steve Mix	6 ft 7 in (2.01 m)	215 lb (98 kg)	1947-12-30	Toledo
G	10	Norm Nixon	6 ft 2 in (1.88 m)	170 lb (77 kg)	1955-10-11	Duquesne
F	31	Kurt Rambis	6 ft 8 in (2.03 m)	213 lb (97 kg)	1958-02-25	Santa Clara
F	52	Jamaal Wilkes	6 ft 6 in (1.98 m)	190 lb (86 kg)	1953-05-02	UCLA
F	42	James Worthy	6 ft 9 in (2.06 m)	225 lb (102 kg)	1961-02-27	North Carolina

Coaches
Head coach
- Pat Riley
Assistant(s)
- Bill Bertka
- Dave Wohl

Legend
- (DP) Unsigned draft pick
- (FA) Free agent
- (S) Suspended
- (L) On leave from the team
- Injured

Roster
Updated: April 16, 1983

== Regular season ==
=== Season standings ===
Pacific Division
Team	W	L	PCT.	GB
Los Angeles Lakers	58	24	.707	-
Phoenix Suns	53	29	.646	5
Seattle SuperSonics	48	34	.585	10
Portland Trail Blazers	46	36	.561	12
Golden State Warriors	30	52	.366	28
San Diego Clippers	25	57	.305	33

== Game log ==
=== Regular season ===
1982–83 game log
Total: 58–24 (home: 33–8; road: 25–16)
October: 0–1 (home: 0–1; road: 0–0)

Game	Date	Team	Score	High points	High rebounds	High assists	Location Attendance	Record
1	October 29	Golden State	L 117-132	Magic Johnson (22)	Abdul-Jabbar & Johnson (10)	Magic Johnson (10)	The Forum; 15,802	0–1

November: 12–3 (home: 8–0; road: 4–3)

Game	Date	Team	Score	High points	High rebounds	High assists	Location Attendance	Record
2	November 3	@ Denver	W 135-134 (OT)	3 players tied (22)	Magic Johnson (15)	Magic Johnson (13)	McNichols Sports Arena; 14,807	1-1
3	November 4	Denver	W 131-108	Norm Nixon (21)	Kurt Rambis (11)	Magic Johnson (9)	The Forum; 12,815	2–1
4	November 6	@ Utah	W 104-101	Abdul-Jabbar & Johnson (22)	Magic Johnson (11)	Magic Johnson (8)	Salt Palace; 11,869	3–1
5	November 7	Portland	W 103-89	Kareem Abdul-Jabbar (22)	Kareem Abdul-Jabbar (11)	Magic Johnson (10)	The Forum; 13,526	4–1
6	November 9	Kansas City	W 139-117	Norm Nixon (20)	Abdul-Jabbar & Worthy (7)	Norm Nixon (13)	The Forum; 12,402	5–1
7	November 12	Houston	W 127-96	Magic Johnson (28)	Johnson & Wilkes (10)	Norm Nixon (10)	The Forum; 15,804	6–1
8	November 14	Cleveland	W 111-98	Jamaal Wilkes (30)	Magic Johnson (12)	Norm Nixon (12)	The Forum; 12,806	7–1
9	November 16	@ Phoenix	L 105-113	Kareem Abdul-Jabbar (30)	Kareem Abdul-Jabbar (15)	Magic Johnson (7)	Arizona Veterans Memorial Coliseum; 13,288	7–2
10	November 17	@ Dallas	L 117-118	Kareem Abdul-Jabbar (22)	Kurt Rambis (9)	Norm Nixon (13)	Reunion Arena; 17,134	7–3
11	November 19	Washington	W 122-92	Kareem Abdul-Jabbar (23)	3 players tied (9)	Norm Nixon (10)	The Forum; 14,945	8–3
12	November 21	Denver	W 143-129	Kareem Abdul-Jabbar (29)	Kurt Rambis (16)	Norm Nixon (15)	The Forum; 17,505	9–3
13	November 24	@ Seattle	W 111-93	James Worthy (26)	Kareem Abdul-Jabbar (13)	Magic Johnson (10)	Kingdome; 26,230	10–3
14	November 26	@ San Diego	W 117-115	Magic Johnson (32)	Kareem Abdul-Jabbar (13)	Norm Nixon (8)	San Diego Sports Arena; 12,077	11–3
15	November 28	Golden State	W 142-127	Kareem Abdul-Jabbar (27)	Kurt Rambis (9)	Magic Johnson (13)	The Forum; 16,125	12–3
16 (Note: The Spurs protested the original ending of the game, a double-overtime Lakers win, which was upheld by NBA commissioner Larry O'Brien. The conclusion of the game was replayed on April 13, 1983.)	November 30	@ San Antonio	L 114-117	Norm Nixon (23)	James Worthy (10)	Norm Nixon (11)	HemisFair Arena; 12,115	12–4

December: 12–3 (home: 6–1; road: 6–2)

Game	Date	Team	Score	High points	High rebounds	High assists	Location Attendance	Record
17	December 1	@ Houston	W 106-95	Johnson & McAdoo (19)	Abdul-Jabbar & Wilkes (8)	Magic Johnson (10)	The Summit; 8,786	13–4
18	December 3	Portland	W 115-100	Kareem Abdul-Jabbar (22)	3 players tied (9)	Magic Johnson (14)	The Forum; 13,787	14–4
19	December 5	Philadelphia	L 104-114	Jamaal Wilkes (22)	Bob McAdoo (9)	Johnson & Nixon (7)	The Forum	14–5
20	December 8	Phoenix	W 89-86	Jamaal Wilkes (20)	Kurt Rambis (13)	Magic Johnson (8)	The Forum; 13,763	15–5
21	December 10	@ Utah	W 128-122	Bob McAdoo (26)	Magic Johnson (12)	Magic Johnson (13)	Salt Palace; 9,023	16–5
22	December 11	@ Golden State	W 128-107	Kurt Rambis (20)	Kurt Rambis (14)	Cooper & Nixon (9)	Oakland-Alameda County Coliseum Arena; 13,335	17–5
23	December 14	@ Portland	L 103-107	Magic Johnson (24)	Magic Johnson (8)	Magic Johnson (12)	Memorial Coliseum	17–6
24	December 17	New Jersey	W 117-106	Jamaal Wilkes (27)	Johnson & Wilkes (8)	Magic Johnson (13)	The Forum; 15,786	18–6
25	December 18	@ Phoenix	L 100-126	Jamaal Wilkes (20)	Bob McAdoo (8)	James Worthy (7)	Arizona Veterans Memorial Coliseum; 12,856	18–7
26	December 19	Dallas	W 110-108	Kareem Abdul-Jabbar (33)	Kareem Abdul-Jabbar (17)	Magic Johnson (13)	The Forum; 14,094	19–7
27	December 22	Utah	W 124-100	Bob McAdoo (22)	3 players tied (7)	Magic Johnson (12)	The Forum; 12,358	20–7
28	December 23	@ San Diego	W 120-115	Magic Johnson (23)	Abdul-Jabbar & Johnson (7)	Magic Johnson (9)	San Diego Sports Arena; 8,160	21–7
29	December 26	@ Houston	W 96-94	Jamaal Wilkes (22)	Magic Johnson (10)	Magic Johnson (4)	The Summit; 10,833	22–7
30	December 29	@ Golden State	W 120-110	Magic Johnson (27)	Kurt Rambis (13)	Magic Johnson (10)	Oakland-Alameda County Coliseum Arena; 13,335	23–7
31	December 30	Seattle	W 137-117	Norm Nixon (24)	Magic Johnson (8)	Magic Johnson (16)	The Forum; 17,505	24–7

January: 10–3 (home: 6–0; road: 4–3)

Game	Date	Team	Score	High points	High rebounds	High assists	Location Attendance	Record
32	January 2	Detroit	W 127-112	Kareem Abdul-Jabbar (28)	Magic Johnson (7)	Magic Johnson (12)	The Forum; 15,343	25–7
33	January 5	@ Philadelphia	L 120-122 (OT)	Jamaal Wilkes (36)	Magic Johnson (12)	Magic Johnson (20)	The Spectrum; 18,482	25–8
34	January 6	@ Cleveland	W 125-107	Norm Nixon (20)	Kurt Rambis (12)	Magic Johnson (8)	Richfield Coliseum; 11,270	26–8
35	January 8	@ New York	W 108-90	McAdoo & Wilkes (20)	Kareem Abdul-Jabbar (10)	Johnson & Nixon (8)	Madison Square Garden; 19,591	27–8
36	January 11	@ New Jersey	L 96-110	Wilkes & Worthy (17)	Johnson & McAdoo (8)	Magic Johnson (11)	Brendan Byrne Arena; 20,149	27–9
37	January 15	@ Atlanta	W 120-101	Jamaal Wilkes (21)	Magic Johnson (17)	Magic Johnson (21)	Omni Coliseum; 15,956	28–9
38	January 19	San Diego	W 107-104	Jamaal Wilkes (26)	Kurt Rambis (10)	Magic Johnson (12)	The Forum	29–9
39	January 21	San Antonio	W 119-110	Kareem Abdul-Jabbar (23)	Bob McAdoo (7)	Norm Nixon (15)	The Forum	30–9
40	January 23	Indiana	W 105-102	Jamaal Wilkes (28)	Bob McAdoo (9)	Kareem Abdul-Jabbar (7)	The Forum; 14,139	31–9
41	January 25	@ Portland	W 125-120	Kareem Abdul-Jabbar (25)	Magic Johnson (9)	Magic Johnson (9)	Memorial Coliseum; 12,666	32–9
42	January 26	Milwaukee	W 115-113	Kareem Abdul-Jabbar (29)	Magic Johnson (12)	Magic Johnson (20)	The Forum; 17,505	33–9
43	January 28	Atlanta	W 109-85	Magic Johnson (21)	Kurt Rambis (12)	Magic Johnson (9)	The Forum; 17,505	34–9
44	January 30	@ Boston	L 95-110	Kareem Abdul-Jabbar (27)	Magic Johnson (9)	Magic Johnson (10)	Boston Garden; 15,320	34–10

February: 6–6 (home: 2–3; road: 4–3)

Game	Date	Team	Score	High points	High rebounds	High assists	Location Attendance	Record
45	February 2	@ Dallas	L 120-122	Kareem Abdul-Jabbar (34)	Johnson & Rambis (9)	3 players tied (6)	Reunion Arena; 17,134	34–11
46	February 4	@ Kansas City	W 143-125	Kareem Abdul-Jabbar (28)	Magic Johnson (10)	Magic Johnson (15)	Checkerdome	35–11
47	February 6	Kansas City	W 116-106	Kareem Abdul-Jabbar (18)	James Worthy (8)	Magic Johnson (11)	The Forum; 17,505	36–11
48	February 8	@ Seattle	W 121-118	Kareem Abdul-Jabbar (30)	Magic Johnson (10)	Magic Johnson (11)	Kingdome; 19,726	37–11
49	February 9	Utah	W 113-99	Jamaal Wilkes (22)	Kareem Abdul-Jabbar (13)	Magic Johnson (12)	The Forum; 13,656	38–11
All-Star Break
50	February 15	San Antonio	L 103-124	Kareem Abdul-Jabbar (26)	Abdul-Jabbar & McAdoo (10)	Norm Nixon (12)	The Forum; 15,111	38–12
51	February 17	@ Dallas	W 127-110	Kareem Abdul-Jabbar (32)	Kareem Abdul-Jabbar (13)	Magic Johnson (11)	Reunion Arena; 17,134	39–12
52	February 18	@ Kansas City	L 118-124	Jamaal Wilkes (26)	Johnson & Worthy (7)	Magic Johnson (15)	Kemper Arena; 15,116	39–13
53	February 20	@ Indiana	W 126-112	Magic Johnson (27)	Kareem Abdul-Jabbar (13)	Norm Nixon (13)	Market Square Arena; 10,952	40–13
54	February 23	Boston	L 104-113	Magic Johnson (20)	Magic Johnson (13)	Magic Johnson (10)	The Forum; 17,505	40–14
55	February 26	@ Utah	L 92-101	Jamaal Wilkes (17)	3 players tied (9)	Magic Johnson (10)	Salt Palace; 12,097	40–15
56	February 27	Denver	L 120-135	Magic Johnson (28)	Kurt Rambis (14)	Magic Johnson (11)	The Forum; 17,505	40–16

March: 13–3 (home: 8–1; road: 5–2)

Game	Date	Team	Score	High points	High rebounds	High assists	Location Attendance	Record
57	March 1	@ Chicago	W 114-111	Kareem Abdul-Jabbar (31)	Kareem Abdul-Jabbar (13)	Abdul-Jabbar & Johnson (8)	Chicago Stadium; 15,307	41–16
58	March 2	@ Milwaukee	W 127-117	Magic Johnson (34)	3 players tied (7)	Magic Johnson (15)	MECCA Arena; 11,052	42–16
59	March 4	@ Washington	L 93-96	Norm Nixon (26)	Kurt Rambis (9)	Magic Johnson (10)	Capital Centre; 17,118	42–17
60	March 5	@ Detroit	W 122-108	James Worthy (28)	Johnson & Worthy (10)	Magic Johnson (16)	Pontiac Silverdome; 25,278	43–17
61	March 8	@ Golden State	W 116-112	Magic Johnson (31)	Magic Johnson (12)	Johnson & Nixon (9)	Oakland-Alameda County Coliseum Arena; 13,335	44–17
62	March 9	San Diego	W 119-114	Kareem Abdul-Jabbar (31)	Kareem Abdul-Jabbar (8)	Magic Johnson (20)	The Forum; 17,505	45–17
63	March 12	Chicago	W 123-116	Norm Nixon (27)	Magic Johnson (12)	Magic Johnson (14)	The Forum; 17,505	46–17
64	March 16	Phoenix	W 104-95	Magic Johnson (25)	Magic Johnson (11)	Norm Nixon (12)	The Forum; 16,060	47–17
65	March 18	Kansas City	W 109-96	Kareem Abdul-Jabbar (35)	Kurt Rambis (12)	Norm Nixon (13)	The Forum; 15,817	48–17
66	March 19	@ San Diego	L 99-107	Jamaal Wilkes (22)	Kareem Abdul-Jabbar (8)	Norm Nixon (10)	San Diego Sports Arena; 13,075	48–18
67	March 20	Dallas	W 117-110	Kareem Abdul-Jabbar (23)	Kurt Rambis (9)	Magic Johnson (16)	The Forum; 17,505	49–18
68	March 22	Seattle	W 123-108	Jamaal Wilkes (26)	Magic Johnson (15)	Magic Johnson (11)	The Forum; 17,505	50–18
69	March 25	San Antonio	L 120-132	Kareem Abdul-Jabbar (23)	Magic Johnson (12)	Magic Johnson (11)	The Forum; 17,505	50–19
70	March 27	Houston	W 114-93	Magic Johnson (26)	Dwight Jones (9)	Magic Johnson (9)	The Forum; 14,719	51–19
71	March 29	San Diego	W 127-109	Kareem Abdul-Jabbar (26)	Kareem Abdul-Jabbar (7)	Magic Johnson (8)	The Forum; 16,581	52–19
72	March 31	@ Denver	W 122-116	Kareem Abdul-Jabbar (26)	Magic Johnson (16)	Magic Johnson (12)	McNichols Sports Arena; 17,310	53–19

April: 5–5 (home: 3–2; road: 2–3)

Game	Date	Team	Score	High points	High rebounds	High assists	Location Attendance	Record
73	April 1	New York	W 102-88	Norm Nixon (22)	Magic Johnson (9)	Magic Johnson (12)	The Forum; 17,505	54–19
74	April 4	@ Seattle	L 111-121	Kareem Abdul-Jabbar (26)	Magic Johnson (10)	Magic Johnson (8)	Kingdome; 18,045	54–20
75	April 5	@ Portland	L 101-107	Kareem Abdul-Jabbar (28)	Magic Johnson (16)	Magic Johnson (13)	Memorial Coliseum; 12,666	54–21
76	April 7	@ Phoenix	W 117-108	Kareem Abdul-Jabbar (29)	3 players tied (8)	Magic Johnson (13)	Arizona Veterans Memorial Coliseum; 14,660	55–21
77	April 8	Golden State	W 118-107	Magic Johnson (36)	Magic Johnson (13)	Magic Johnson (14)	The Forum; 15,176	56–21
78	April 10	Phoenix	L 95-101	Jamaal Wilkes (23)	Magic Johnson (9)	Magic Johnson (11)	The Forum; 16,545	56–22
79	April 12	@ Houston	W 114-113	Magic Johnson (31)	Kurt Rambis (10)	Magic Johnson (9)	The Summit; 8,147	57–22
80	April 13	@ San Antonio	L 109-114	Kareem Abdul-Jabbar (38)	Kareem Abdul-Jabbar (7)	Magic Johnson (12)	HemisFair Arena; 15,782	57–23
81	April 15	Seattle	W 100-99	Kareem Abdul-Jabbar (29)	Kurt Rambis (12)	Magic Johnson (12)	The Forum; 17,505	58–23
82	April 17	Portland	L 108-119	Kareem Abdul-Jabbar (31)	Kareem Abdul-Jabbar (10)	Norm Nixon (12)	The Forum; 16,509	58–24

1982–83 schedule

=== Playoffs ===
1983 playoff game log
Total: 8–7 (home: 4–4; road: 4–3)
Conference Semi-finals: 4–1 (home: 3–0; road: 1–1)

Game	Date	Team	Score	High points	High rebounds	High assists	Location Attendance	Series
1	April 24	Portland	W 118–97	Kareem Abdul-Jabbar (32)	Johnson & Rambis (9)	Magic Johnson (18)	The Forum; 13,891	1–0
2	April 26	Portland	W 112–106	Kareem Abdul-Jabbar (37)	Jamaal Wilkes (9)	Kareem Abdul-Jabbar (7)	The Forum; 16,239	2–0
3	April 29	@ Portland	W 115–109 (OT)	Kareem Abdul-Jabbar (30)	Rambis & Wilkes (9)	Magic Johnson (11)	Memorial Coliseum; 12,666	3–0
4	May 1	@ Portland	L 95–108	Kareem Abdul-Jabbar (34)	Kareem Abdul-Jabbar (9)	Magic Johnson (8)	Memorial Coliseum; 12,666	3–1
5	May 3	Portland	W 116–108	Norm Nixon (36)	Kareem Abdul-Jabbar (11)	Magic Johnson (15)	The Forum; 16,739	4–1

Conference finals: 4–2 (home: 1–2; road: 3–0)

Game	Date	Team	Score	High points	High rebounds	High assists	Location Attendance	Series
1	May 8	San Antonio	W 119–107	Abdul-Jabbar & Nixon (30)	3 players tied (8)	Magic Johnson (12)	The Forum; 15,063	1–0
2	May 10	San Antonio	L 113–122	Johnson & Nixon (28)	Magic Johnson (12)	Norm Nixon (11)	The Forum; 17,505	1–1
3	May 13	@ San Antonio	W 113–100	Jamaal Wilkes (26)	Magic Johnson (11)	Magic Johnson (13)	HemisFair Arena; 15,782	2–1
4	May 15	@ San Antonio	W 129–121	Magic Johnson (31)	Magic Johnson (8)	Magic Johnson (17)	HemisFair Arena; 15,782	3–1
5	May 18	San Antonio	L 112–117	Kareem Abdul-Jabbar (30)	Magic Johnson (11)	Magic Johnson (19)	The Forum; 17,505	3–2
6	May 20	@ San Antonio	W 101–100	Kareem Abdul-Jabbar (28)	Magic Johnson (15)	Magic Johnson (16)	HemisFair Arena; 15,782	4–2

NBA Finals: 0–4 (home: 0–2; road: 0–2)

Game	Date	Team	Score	High points	High rebounds	High assists	Location Attendance	Series
1	May 22	@ Philadelphia	L 107–113	Norm Nixon (26)	Mark Landsberger (10)	Magic Johnson (11)	The Spectrum; 18,482	0–1
2	May 26	@ Philadelphia	L 93–103	Kareem Abdul-Jabbar (23)	Magic Johnson (8)	Magic Johnson (13)	The Spectrum; 18,482	0–2
3	May 29	Philadelphia	L 94–111	Kareem Abdul-Jabbar (23)	Kareem Abdul-Jabbar (15)	Magic Johnson (13)	The Forum; 17,505	0–3
4	May 31	Philadelphia	L 108–115	Kareem Abdul-Jabbar (28)	4 players tied (7)	Magic Johnson (13)	The Forum; 17,505	0–4

1983 schedule

== Player statistics ==
Note: GP= Games played; MPG= Minutes per Game; REB = Rebounds; AST = Assists; STL = Steals; BLK = Blocks; PTS = Points; PPG = Points per Game

=== Season ===
Player	GP	MPG	REB	AST	STL	BLK	PTS	PPG
Kareem Abdul-Jabbar	79	32.3	592	200	61	170	1722	21.8
Jamaal Wilkes	80	31.9	343	182	65	17	1571	19.6
Magic Johnson	79	36.8	683	829	176	47	1326	16.8
Norm Nixon	79	34.3	205	566	104	4	1191	15.1
Bob McAdoo	47	21.7	247	39	40	40	703	15.0
James Worthy	77	25.6	399	132	91	64	1033	13.4
Michael Cooper	82	26.2	274	315	115	50	639	7.8
Kurt Rambis	78	23.2	531	90	105	63	584	7.5
Dwight Jones	32	15.3	114	22	13	9	156	4.9
Mike McGee	39	9.8	53	26	11	5	156	4.0
Clay Johnson	48	9.3	69	24	22	4	144	3.0
Mark Landsberger	39	9.1	128	12	8	4	98	2.5
Eddie Jordan	35	9.5	26	80	31	1	94	2.7
Steve Mix	1	17.0	1	2	0	0	9	9.0
Billy Ray Bates	4	6.8	1	0	1	0	5	1.3
Joe Cooper	2	5.5	2	0	1	1	2	1.0

== Award winners/Honors ==
- Kareem Abdul-Jabbar, Second Team All-NBA, All-Star
- Michael Cooper, Second Team All-Defense
- Magic Johnson, First Team All-NBA, All-Star
- Jamaal Wilkes, All-Star
- James Worthy, First Team All-Rookie
