= Rory Sparrow =

American basketball player (born 1958)

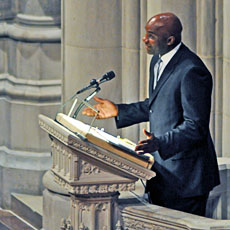
- Sparrow speaks at Manute Bol's funeral in June 2010

Personal information
- Born: June 12, 1958 (age 68) Suffolk, Virginia, U.S.
- Listed height: 6 ft 2 in (1.88 m)
- Listed weight: 175 lb (79 kg)

Career information
- High school: Eastside (Paterson, New Jersey)
- College: Villanova (1976–1980)
- NBA draft: 1980: 4th round, 75th overall pick
- Drafted by: New Jersey Nets
- Playing career: 1980–1992
- Position: Point guard
- Number: 34, 2

Career history
- 1980: Scranton Aces
- 1980–1981: New Jersey Nets
- 1981–1983: Atlanta Hawks
- 1983–1987: New York Knicks
- 1987–1988: Chicago Bulls
- 1988–1990: Miami Heat
- 1990–1991: Sacramento Kings
- 1991: Chicago Bulls
- 1991–1992: Los Angeles Lakers

Career highlights
- SI Sportsperson of the Year (1987) (Note: Shared with Patty Sheehan, Reggie Williams, Chip Rives, Bob Bourne, Judi Brown King, Dale Murphy, and Kipchoge Keino.); Second-team All-Eastern 8 (1980)

Career NBA statistics
- Points: 7,557 (9.0 ppg)
- Rebounds: 1,755 (2.1 rpg)
- Assists: 4,192 (5.0 apg)
- Stats at NBA.com
- Stats at Basketball Reference

Rory Darnell Sparrow (born June 12, 1958) is an American former professional basketball player who played in the National Basketball Association (NBA).

Born in Suffolk, Virginia, Sparrow played at Eastside High School in Paterson, New Jersey, and was an inaugural inductee into the school's Hall of Fame.

He played collegiately at Villanova University, where he scored 1183 career points, and made 495 assists. In college, Sparrow made game-winning shots in the last ten seconds of the game on five occasions.

Sparrow, a 6'2" guard, was selected 75th overall (round 4, pick 6) of the 1980 NBA draft by the New Jersey Nets. Including the Nets, he played with the Atlanta Hawks, New York Knicks, Chicago Bulls, Miami Heat, Sacramento Kings and Los Angeles Lakers over a 12-year career, retiring after the 1991-92 season. He scored the first field goal in Miami Heat history, when the franchise was created in 1988.

== Biography ==
Throughout his 12-year career Rory Sparrow was known as one of the steadiest guards in the NBA. He had his best years with the Atlanta Hawks and the New York Knicks in the early 1980s, then went on to become a charter member of the expansion Miami Heat. In addition to his on-court success, Sparrow earned equal recognition for his tireless efforts in the community. In 1987 he was one of eight charitable athletes honored by Sports Illustrated as co-Sportsman of the Year.

Sparrow's NBA career had humble beginnings. After playing for Rollie Massimino at Villanova, he was selected by the New Jersey Nets in the fourth round of the 1980 NBA Draft. When the Nets waived Sparrow in training camp, he turned to the Continental Basketball Association, where he latched on with the Scranton Aces. In 20 games for the Aces, Sparrow averaged 24.1 points and 9.0 assists. The Nets called him up twice during the 1980–81 campaign, but he appeared in only 15 NBA games that year.

Prior to the 1981–82 season New Jersey traded Sparrow to the Atlanta Hawks for a fourth-round draft choice. Coach Kevin Loughery made him an immediate starter at point guard, and Sparrow never looked back. Leaving his CBA days behind him, he appeared in all 82 games and averaged 10.5 points and 5.2 assists in more than 30 minutes per game. The Hawks finished 42–40 but lost in the first round of the playoffs.

Midway through the next season Atlanta traded Sparrow to the New York Knicks for Scott Hastings. Over the next five years Sparrow became a staple in an otherwise shifting New York backcourt. He enjoyed his greatest team success during the 1983–84 campaign. The Knicks posted a 47–35 record, beat the Detroit Pistons in the opening round of the playoffs, and then fell to the Boston Celtics in a tough seven-game series in the conference semifinals. As a starter in the backcourt, Sparrow averaged 10.4 points and 6.8 assists in the regular season, then contributed 11.2 points per game in the playoffs.

The following year, he set a career high for assists with 7.1 per game. In 1985–86, he averaged 10.8 points and 6.4 assists. New York, however, won only 23 games, posting its worst record since 1963–64.

During his tenure in New York, Sparrow set up the Rory F. Sparrow Foundation, a charitable organization designed to aid underprivileged children in the New York metropolitan area. At the end of the 1985–86 season Sparrow was recognized for his efforts when he and the Lakers' Michael Cooper were named co-winners of the J. Walter Kennedy Citizenship Award. Then, in the 1987 year-end issue of Sports Illustrated, Sparrow was featured on the cover as one of eight "Athletes Who Care." The magazine collectively honored the group as Sportsmen and Sportswomen of the Year.

Early in the 1987–88 season the Knicks traded Sparrow to the Chicago Bulls, where he played sparingly as a backup to Michael Jordan and Sam Vincent. Prior to the 1988–89 campaign he signed as a free agent with the Miami Heat. On November 5, 1988, in a game against the Los Angeles Clippers, Sparrow scored the first points in Heat history. He went on to average a career-high 12.5 points for the year, second on the team behind Kevin Edwards.

In his second season with the Heat, Sparrow was relegated to a back-up role behind rookie Sherman Douglas. Prior to the 1990–91 season he was traded to the Sacramento Kings, where he found new life and scored 10.4 points per game. Sparrow split the 1991–92 season between the Chicago Bulls and the Los Angeles Lakers before retiring at age 34. All told, he tallied 7,557 points for seven different teams and posted a career average of 9.0 points per game.

In 1994, he went to work for the NBA league office as player programs manager.

== Career statistics ==
Legend
GP	Games played	GS	Games started	MPG	Minutes per game
FG%	Field goal percentage	3P%	3-point field goal percentage	FT%	Free throw percentage
RPG	Rebounds per game	APG	Assists per game	SPG	Steals per game
BPG	Blocks per game	PPG	Points per game	**Bold**	Career high
*	Led the league

=== NBA ===
==== Regular season ====
Year	Team	GP	GS	MPG	FG%	3P%	FT%	RPG	APG	SPG	BPG	PPG
1980–81	New Jersey	15		14.1	.349	–	.750	1.2	2.1	.9	**.2**	3.7
1981–82	Atlanta	**82**	**82**	31.8	.501	.067	.838	2.7	5.2	1.1	**.2**	10.5
1982–83	Atlanta	49	49	31.6	**.516**	.200	.743	**2.9**	4.9	**1.4**	.0	**12.6**
1982–83	New York	32	9	27.5	.430	.286	.733	2.8	5.0	1.2	.1	10.0
1983–84	New York	79	74	30.8	.474	.256	.824	2.4	6.8	1.3	.1	10.4
1984–85	New York	79	41	29.0	.492	.226	.865	2.1	**7.1**	1.0	.1	9.9
1985–86	New York	74	74	31.7	.477	.250	.795	2.3	6.4	1.1	**.2**	10.8
1986–87	New York	80	30	24.4	.446	.262	.798	1.4	5.4	.8	.1	7.6
1987–88	New York	3	0	17.3	.263	.000	–	.7	1.7	1.3	.0	3.3
1987–88	Chicago	55	25	18.0	.409	.167	.727	1.3	2.9	.7	.1	4.5
1988–89	Miami	80	79	**32.7**	.452	.243	**.879**	2.7	5.4	1.3	**.2**	12.5
1989–90	Miami	**82***	25	21.4	.412	.200	.766	1.7	3.6	.6	.0	5.9
1990–91	Sacramento	80	74	29.7	.491	.397	.699	2.3	4.5	1.0	**.2**	10.4
1991–92	Chicago	4	0	4.5	.125	**.500**	–	.3	1.0	.0	.0	.8
1991–92	L.A. Lakers	42	0	11.2	.399	.154	.615	.6	1.9	.3	.1	3.0
Career		836	562	27.0	.466	.260	.797	2.1	5.0	1.0	.1	9.0

==== Playoffs ====
Year	Team	GP	GS	MPG	FG%	3P%	FT%	RPG	APG	SPG	BPG	PPG
1982	Atlanta	2		**34.5**	.417	.000	**1.000**	**4.0**	5.5	1.0	.0	7.0
1983	New York	6		33.7	.423	.200	.810	2.2	7.0	**1.2**	.0	**13.0**
1984	New York	**12**		32.4	**.446**	.333	.800	2.2	**7.2**	1.0	**.1**	11.2
1988	Chicago	7	0	15.1	.313	**.500**	.667	.4	2.6	.6	.0	3.7
1992	L.A. Lakers	3	0	5.3	.250	–	.750	.3	1.3	.3	.0	1.7
Career		30	0	26.1	.417	.313	.800	1.7	5.4	.9	.0	8.6
