= Eddie Phillips (basketball) =

American basketball player (born 1961)

Personal information
- Born: September 29, 1961 (age 65) Birmingham, Alabama, U.S.
- Listed height: 6 ft 7 in (2.01 m)
- Listed weight: 225 lb (102 kg)

Career information
- High school: A. H. Parker (Birmingham, Alabama)
- College: Alabama (1978–1982)
- NBA draft: 1982: 1st round, 21st overall pick
- Drafted by: New Jersey Nets
- Playing career: 1982–1995
- Position: Power forward
- Number: 51

Career history
- 1982–1983: New Jersey Nets
- 1983–1984: Latini Forlì
- 1984–1988: Canarias
- 1988–1989: Hapoel Holon
- 1989–1990: Ferro Carril Oeste
- 1993–1994: Beitar Ramat Gan
- 1994–1995: Hapoel Holon

Career highlights
- Spanish League Top Scorer (1987); 2× Second-team All-SEC (1981, 1982); Alabama Mr. Basketball (1978)
- Stats at NBA.com
- Stats at Basketball Reference

Eddie Lee Phillips (born September 29, 1961) is an American former professional basketball player who played briefly in the National Basketball Association (NBA). At a height of 6'7", he played at the power forward position.

== College career ==
Born in Birmingham, Alabama, Phillips was a graduate of the University of Alabama, where he played college basketball with the Crimson Tide. He averaged 16.4 points and 9.9 rebounds per game, during his college basketball career.

== Professional career ==
Philipps was drafted by the New Jersey Nets in the 1982 NBA draft, with the number 21 pick overall, but he played in only one season in the NBA, averaging 3.2 points and 1.6 rebounds per game, in 48 games played.

He later starred in professional leagues in Italy, Spain, and Israel.

== Career statistics ==
Legend
GP	Games played	GS	Games started	MPG	Minutes per game
FG%	Field goal percentage	3P%	3-point field goal percentage	FT%	Free throw percentage
RPG	Rebounds per game	APG	Assists per game	SPG	Steals per game
BPG	Blocks per game	PPG	Points per game	**Bold**	Career high

=== NBA ===
==== Regular season ====
Year	Team	GP	GS	MPG	FG%	3P%	FT%	RPG	APG	SPG	BPG	PPG
1982–83	New Jersey	48	0	8.7	.406	.000	.678	1.6	.6	.3	.2	3.2

==== Playoffs ====
Year	Team	GP	MPG	FG%	3P%	FT%	RPG	APG	SPG	BPG	PPG
1983	New Jersey	2	6.0	.500	.000	.250	2.5	1.5	.0	.0	3.5
