= Jose Slaughter =

American basketball player (born 1960)

Personal information
- Born: September 9, 1960 (age 66) Los Angeles, California, U.S.
- Listed height: 6 ft 5 in (1.96 m)
- Listed weight: 205 lb (93 kg)

Career information
- High school: Compton (Compton, California)
- College: Portland (1978–1982)
- NBA draft: 1982: 2nd round, 43rd overall pick
- Drafted by: Indiana Pacers
- Playing career: 1982–1992
- Position: Shooting guard
- Number: 21

Career history
- 1982–1983: Indiana Pacers
- 1983–1985: Wisconsin Flyers
- 1988: Vancouver Nighthawks
- 1987: Hills Bros. Coffee Kings
- 1987–1988: Rochester Flyers
- 1988–1989: Rockford Lightning
- 1989–1990: Quad City Thunder
- 1990: Pepsi Hotshots
- 1991: Suncoast Sunblasters
- 1991–1992: Albany Patroons
- 1992: Yakima SunKings

Career highlights
- CBA All-Star (1990); All-CBA First Team (1985); CBA All-Defensive First Team (1985); CBA All-Defensive Second Team (1984); 2× First-team All-WCC (1981, 1982); 1x World Basketball League All-Star (1988); 1x MVP WBL All-Star Game (1988)
- Stats at NBA.com
- Stats at Basketball Reference

Jose Dan Slaughter (born September 9, 1960) is an American former basketball player. He was a 6'5" 220 lb (100 kg) shooting guard and attended the University of Portland.

Slaughter played for the NBA's Indiana Pacers during the 1982-83 season, averaging 5.7 points and 1.9 rebounds per game. He was originally selected by the Pacers with the 20th pick in the second round (43rd overall) of the 1982 NBA draft.

Slaughter played in the Continental Basketball Association (CBA) for the Wisconsin Flyers, Rochester Flyers, Rockford Lightning, Quad City Thunder, Albany Patroons and Yakima SunKings from 1983 to 1992. He was selected to the All-CBA First Team in 1985, All-Defensive First Team in 1985 and All-Defensive Second Team in 1984.

Slaughter also played overseas to compete as an import in the Philippine Basketball Association (PBA) for the Hills Bros. Coffee Kings during the 1987 Reinforced Conference where he led them to a runner-up finish in the championship finals. He had also set the PBA record by making 14 3-pointers in a single game for an import. He came back to the PBA in 1990 to play for the Pepsi Hotshots but did not achieve the same success as before.

Slaughter was a starter for the American Conference in the 1990 CBA All-Star Game and won the event's Long Distance Shootout. Representing the Quad City Thunder, he defeated Leon Wood 15–9 in the final round of the three-point contest.

== Career statistics ==
Legend
GP	Games played	GS	Games started	MPG	Minutes per game
FG%	Field goal percentage	3P%	3-point field goal percentage	FT%	Free throw percentage
RPG	Rebounds per game	APG	Assists per game	SPG	Steals per game
BPG	Blocks per game	PPG	Points per game	**Bold**	Career high

=== NBA ===
==== Regular season ====
Year	Team	GP	GS	MPG	FG%	3P%	FT%	RPG	APG	SPG	BPG	PPG
1982–83	Indiana	63	1	8.2	.374	.220	.644	1.1	.8	.6	.1	3.6
