= Keith Edmonson =

American basketball player (born 1960)

Personal information
- Born: September 28, 1960 (age 66) Gulfport, Mississippi, U.S.
- Listed height: 6 ft 5 in (1.96 m)
- Listed weight: 195 lb (88 kg)

Career information
- High school: Douglas MacArthur (San Antonio, Texas)
- College: Purdue (1978–1982)
- NBA draft: 1982: 1st round, 10th overall pick
- Drafted by: Atlanta Hawks
- Playing career: 1982–1986
- Position: Shooting guard
- Number: 11, 10

Career history
- 1982–1983: Atlanta Hawks
- 1983–1984: San Antonio Spurs
- 1984: Denver Nuggets
- 1984–1985: Louisville Catbirds
- 1985–1986: Caen Basket Calvados

Career highlights
- French League Best Scorer (1986)
- Stats at NBA.com
- Stats at Basketball Reference

Keith Andre Edmonson (born September 28, 1960) is an American former professional basketball player. He was born in Gulfport, Mississippi.

== College career ==
Edmonson was a part of the Purdue Boilermakers team that reached the 1980 NCAA Final Four. He averaged 21.3 points per game in his senior year.

== Professional career ==
Edmonson was selected 10th overall in the 1982 NBA draft, by the Atlanta Hawks. He averaged six points per game in an 87-game NBA career, playing with the Hawks, the San Antonio Spurs, and the Denver Nuggets.

== Career statistics ==
Legend
GP	Games played	GS	Games started	MPG	Minutes per game
FG%	Field goal percentage	3P%	3-point field goal percentage	FT%	Free throw percentage
RPG	Rebounds per game	APG	Assists per game	SPG	Steals per game
BPG	Blocks per game	PPG	Points per game	**Bold**	Career high

=== NBA ===
==== Regular season ====
Year	Team	GP	GS	MPG	FG%	3P%	FT%	RPG	APG	SPG	BPG	PPG
1982–83	Atlanta	32	**2**	9.7	.345	.000	.593	1.2	**.7**	.3	**.2**	3.5
1983–84	San Antonio	**40**	0	**13.0**	**.493**	–	**.752**	**1.8**	**.7**	**.6**	**.2**	**8.7**
1983–84	Denver	15	0	6.7	.489	–	.720	1.2	.5	.3	.1	4.3
Career		87	2	10.7	.448	.000	.719	1.5	.6	.4	.1	6.0

==== Playoffs ====
Year	Team	GP	MPG	FG%	3P%	FT%	RPG	APG	SPG	BPG	PPG
1983	Atlanta	1	2.0	1.000	–	–	1.0	1.0	.0	.0	2.0
