= Rudy Macklin =

American basketball player (born 1958)

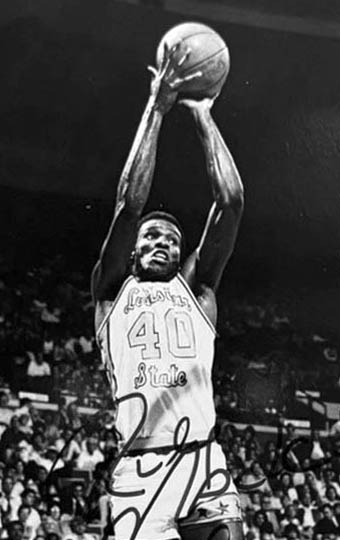
- Macklin with LSU

Personal information
- Born: February 19, 1958 (age 68) Louisville, Kentucky, U.S.
- Listed height: 6 ft 7 in (2.01 m)
- Listed weight: 205 lb (93 kg)

Career information
- High school: Shawnee (Louisville, Kentucky)
- College: LSU (1976–1981)
- NBA draft: 1981: 3rd round, 52nd overall pick
- Drafted by: Atlanta Hawks
- Playing career: 1981–1984
- Position: Small forward / shooting guard
- Number: 40, 41, 56

Career history
- 1981–1983: Atlanta Hawks
- 1983: New York Knicks
- 1983–1984: Albany Patroons

Career highlights
- CBA champion (1984); Consensus second-team All-American (1981); SEC Player of the Year (1981); 3× First-team All-SEC (1978, 1980, 1981); Third-team All-SEC (1977); No. 40 retired by LSU Tigers
- Stats at NBA.com
- Stats at Basketball Reference

Durand "Rudy" Macklin (born February 19, 1958) is an American former professional basketball player.

A 6'7" forward from Louisville, Kentucky, Macklin played at Louisiana State University from 1976 to 1981. In his very first game for LSU, he grabbed 32 rebounds against Tulane University. He missed most of the 1978–79 season because of an ankle injury, but recovered, and was named an NCAA First Team All-American in 1980 and 1981. As a senior, he was named the Southeastern Conference Player of the Year and led LSU to the NCAA Final Four. He graduated as LSU's all-time leading rebounder (1,276) and second-all-time leading scorer (2,080).

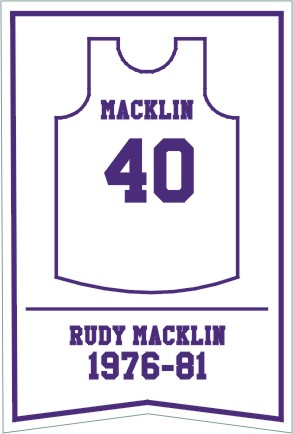
Macklin's #40 was retired by Louisiana State University

In 1981, Macklin was selected by the Atlanta Hawks with the 52nd overall pick of the NBA draft. He played two seasons with the Hawks, averaging 6.5 points per game and 3.0 rebounds per game. He was then traded to the New York Knicks for Sly Williams, but was cut by the Knicks after just eight games because chronic muscle cramping was hindering his play. Macklin tried to revive his basketball career with stints in the Continental Basketball Association, winning a CBA championship with the Albany Patroons in 1984, and in the Philippines, but continued to be dogged by muscle cramping, and decided to retire from the sport to become a banker in Baton Rouge, Louisiana.

Macklin is currently the executive director of the Louisiana Bureau of Minority Health Access and Promotions and the Governor's Council on Physical Fitness and Sports.

On February 6, 2010, at halftime of the LSU vs. Kentucky basketball game, Macklin became the fourth LSU men's basketball player to have his jersey retired by the school. His number 40 jersey now hangs in the rafters of the Pete Maravich Assembly Center along with Pete Maravich's number 23, Shaquille O'Neal's number 33, and Bob Pettit's number 50.

== Career statistics ==
Legend
GP	Games played	GS	Games started	MPG	Minutes per game
FG%	Field goal percentage	3P%	3-point field goal percentage	FT%	Free throw percentage
RPG	Rebounds per game	APG	Assists per game	SPG	Steals per game
BPG	Blocks per game	PPG	Points per game	**Bold**	Career high

=== NBA ===
==== Regular season ====
Year	Team	GP	GS	MPG	FG%	3P%	FT%	RPG	APG	SPG	BPG	PPG
1981–82	Atlanta	**79**	**32**	**19.2**	.434	.000	.775	**3.3**	.6	.5	**.3**	**7.0**
1982–83	Atlanta	73	20	16.0	**.472**	.000	.771	2.6	**1.0**	**.6**	.1	6.0
1983–84	New York	8	0	8.1	.400	–	**.846**	1.4	.4	.1	.0	4.4
Career		160	52	17.2	.449	.000	.776	2.9	.8	.5	.2	6.4

==== Playoffs ====
Year	Team	GP	MPG	FG%	3P%	FT%	RPG	APG	SPG	BPG	PPG
1981–82	Atlanta	2	15.0	**.500**	.000	**1.000**	1.5	.5	.0	.0	7.0
1982–83	Atlanta	**3**	**26.0**	.458	–	.800	**5.0**	**.7**	**.7**	**.7**	**10.0**
Career		5	21.6	.469	.000	.875	3.6	.6	.4	.4	8.8
