= Clay Johnson (basketball) =

American basketball player

Personal information
- Born: July 18, 1956 (age 70) Yazoo City, Mississippi, U.S.
- Listed height: 6 ft 4 in (1.93 m)
- Listed weight: 175 lb (79 kg)

Career information
- High school: Manual (Kansas City, Missouri)
- College: Metropolitan CC (1974–1976); Missouri (1976–1978)
- NBA draft: 1978: 5th round, 110th overall pick
- Drafted by: Portland Trail Blazers
- Playing career: 1979–1986
- Position: Shooting guard
- Number: 34

Career history
- 1979–1982: Hawaii / Billings Volcanos
- 1982–1983: Los Angeles Lakers
- 1983: Sarasota Stingers
- 1983–1984: Seattle SuperSonics
- 1984–1985: Evansville Thunder
- 1985–1986: Kansas City Sizzlers

Career highlights
- NBA champion (1982)
- Stats at NBA.com
- Stats at Basketball Reference

Clay Johnson lll (born July 18, 1956) is an American former professional basketball player from Yazoo City, Mississippi.

A 6'4" shooting guard from the University of Missouri, Johnson played three seasons (1981–1984) in the National Basketball Association (NBA) as a member of the Los Angeles Lakers and Seattle SuperSonics. He averaged 2.8 points per game in his NBA career and won an NBA championship with the Lakers in 1982.

Johnson played in 65 games spread over two seasons with the Lakers and was a member of the 1982 NBA championship team, appearing in seven playoff games. Johnson also played 192 games in the Continental Basketball Association CBA, averaging 16.7 points and 4.6 rebounds for the Billings Volcanos, Sarasota Stingers, Evansville Thunder and Kansas City Sizzlers from 1979 to 1986.

== Career statistics ==
Legend
GP	Games played	GS	Games started	MPG	Minutes per game
FG%	Field goal percentage	3P%	3-point field goal percentage	FT%	Free throw percentage
RPG	Rebounds per game	APG	Assists per game	SPG	Steals per game
BPG	Blocks per game	PPG	Points per game	**Bold**	Career high
†	Won an NBA championship

=== NBA ===
==== Regular season ====
Year	Team	GP	GS	MPG	FG%	3P%	FT%	RPG	APG	SPG	BPG	PPG
1981–82†	L.A. Lakers	7	0	**9.3**	**.550**	–	.500	**1.7**	**1.0**	.4	**.4**	**3.6**
1982–83	L.A. Lakers	**48**	0	**9.3**	.393	.000	**.792**	1.4	.5	**.5**	.1	3.0
1983–84	Seattle	25	0	7.0	.400	**1.000**	.636	.5	.6	.3	.1	2.2
Career		80	0	8.6	.410	.333	.724	1.2	.6	.4	.1	2.8

=== Playoffs ===
Year	Team	GP	MPG	FG%	3P%	FT%	RPG	APG	SPG	BPG	PPG
1982†	L.A. Lakers	**7**	**5.4**	.556	–	**1.000**	.4	.1	.1	.0	**1.7**
1983	L.A. Lakers	**7**	2.9	**.571**	.000	–	**.6**	.1	.1	.0	1.1
1984	Seattle	3	3.0	.500	.000	–	.3	**.3**	**.3**	.0	1.3
Career		17	3.9	.550	.000	1.000	.5	.2	.2	.0	1.4
