= Scott Hastings (basketball) =

American basketball player (born 1960)

Personal information
- Born: June 3, 1960 (age 66) Independence, Kansas, U.S.
- Listed height: 6 ft 10 in (2.08 m)
- Listed weight: 235 lb (107 kg)

Career information
- High school: Independence (Independence, Kansas)
- College: Arkansas (1978–1982)
- NBA draft: 1982: 2nd round, 29th overall pick
- Drafted by: New York Knicks
- Playing career: 1982–1993
- Position: Power forward / center
- Number: 42, 44, 35, 10

Career history
- 1982–1983: New York Knicks
- 1983–1988: Atlanta Hawks
- 1988–1989: Miami Heat
- 1989–1991: Detroit Pistons
- 1991–1993: Denver Nuggets

Career highlights
- NBA champion (1990); 2× AP honorable mention All-American (1981, 1982); 3× First-team All-SWC (1980–1982)
- Stats at NBA.com
- Stats at Basketball Reference
Medals
Men's basketball
Representing United States
FIBA U19 World Championship
Gold medal – first place	1979 Salvador	National team

Scott Alan Hastings (born June 3, 1960) is an American former professional basketball player in the National Basketball Association (NBA). He is currently a sports radio host and commentator for Altitude Sports Radio KKSE 92.5. His career spanned from 1982–1993 and he played forward/center for the New York Knicks, Atlanta Hawks, Miami Heat, Detroit Pistons, and Denver Nuggets. He played college basketball for the Arkansas Razorbacks.

== Early life and college ==
Hastings was born in Independence, Kansas and attended Independence High School. During his senior year (1977–1978), his team won the high school basketball state championship. Hastings was named High School Player of the Year by the Topeka Capital Journal.

Hastings was heavily recruited, including by the University of Kansas (in his home state) and the University of Arkansas. He eventually chose Arkansas, and while there, he was initiated into the Lambda Chi Alpha fraternity. From 1978 to 1982, he played for the Arkansas Razorbacks men's basketball team coached by Eddie Sutton. Hastings was a four-year letterman. As a sophomore, junior, and senior, he led his team in scoring and rebounds, and earned All-Southwest Conference honors.

== NBA ==
He was selected in the second round (29th overall) by the New York Knicks in the 1982 NBA draft. He was a member of the 1990 Detroit Pistons NBA championship team.

He holds the NBA record for most games in a row without a steal at 65 straight games. This spanned over a 3 year long period from 1989–1992.

== After basketball ==
Hastings co-hosts a daily radio show in Denver, Colorado with Tyler Polumbus and Darren "DMac" McKee on KKSE 92.5 from noon to 3PM. Previously, he co-hosted a radio show with Drew Goodman and Sandy Clough on Sportsradio KKFN 104.3 The Fan until 2016. Prior to 2012, Hastings co-hosted shows with Mike Evans and Alfred Williams. Until 2026, he also provided television color commentary for the Denver Nuggets on the Altitude Sports and Entertainment cable TV network, working alongside Chris Marlowe and Katy Winge. He also hosts a golf show on Altitude during the NBA off-season.

Hastings previously spent 12 years hosting the Sports Zoo with Dave Logan on 850 KOA and served as the Denver Broncos' radio analyst from 1997 to 2004, including the team's appearances in Super Bowl XXXII and Super Bowl XXXIII.

== Career statistics ==
Legend
GP	Games played	GS	Games started	MPG	Minutes per game
FG%	Field goal percentage	3P%	3-point field goal percentage	FT%	Free throw percentage
RPG	Rebounds per game	APG	Assists per game	SPG	Steals per game
BPG	Blocks per game	PPG	Points per game	**Bold**	Career high
†	Won an NBA championship

=== NBA ===
==== Regular season ====
Year	Team	GP	GS	MPG	FG%	3P%	FT%	RPG	APG	SPG	BPG	PPG
1982–83	New York	21	0	4.7	.364	.000	.500	1.5	.0	.2	.0	1.1
1982–83	Atlanta	10	0	4.2	.313	.000	.667	1.0	.2	.1	.1	1.4
1983–84	Atlanta	68	**8**	**16.7**	.468	.250	.788	**4.0**	.7	**.6**	.5	4.5
1984–85	Atlanta	64	1	12.9	.473	–	.778	2.5	.7	.4	.4	3.8
1985–86	Atlanta	62	0	10.5	.409	**.750**	.857	2.0	.4	.2	.1	3.1
1986–87	Atlanta	40	0	6.4	.338	.167	.793	1.8	.3	.3	.2	1.8
1987–88	Atlanta	55	0	7.3	.488	.417	.926	1.8	.3	.1	.2	2.0
1988–89	Miami	75	6	16.1	.436	.321	.850	3.1	**.8**	.4	**.6**	**5.1**
1989–90†	Detroit	40	0	4.2	.303	.250	.864	.8	.2	.1	.1	1.1
1990–91	Detroit	27	0	4.2	**.571**	**.750**	**1.000**	1.0	.3	.0	.0	1.8
1991–92	Denver	40	4	10.5	.340	.000	.857	2.5	.7	.3	.4	1.5
1992–93	Denver	**76**	0	8.8	.509	.250	.727	1.8	.4	.2	.1	2.1
Career		578	19	10.4	.441	.292	.811	2.2	.5	.3	.3	2.8

==== Playoffs ====
Year	Team	GP	GS	MPG	FG%	3P%	FT%	RPG	APG	SPG	BPG	PPG
1984	Atlanta	5		6.4	.222	–	.750	**1.6**	.2	.2	.0	1.4
1986	Atlanta	9	0	5.4	**.786**	.250	.455	1.1	.2	.2	.0	**3.1**
1987	Atlanta	4	0	5.3	.667	–	**1.000**	1.5	.0	**.3**	**.3**	1.5
1988	Atlanta	**11**	0	**9.4**	.643	.000	**1.000**	1.5	**.3**	**.3**	.1	2.4
1990†	Detroit	5	0	3.2	.250	.000	–	.0	.0	.2	.0	.4
1991	Detroit	10	0	3.5	.500	**.500**	–	.6	**.3**	.0	.1	.8
Career		44	0	5.8	.560	.250	.720	1.1	.2	.2	.1	1.8
