= Scotty Robertson =

American basketball player and coach (1930–2011)

Personal information
- Born: February 1, 1930 Fort Smith, Arkansas, U.S.
- Died: August 18, 2011 (aged 81) Ruston, Louisiana, U.S.

Career information
- High school: C. E. Byrd (Shreveport, Louisiana)
- College: Louisiana Tech (1949–1951)
- Coaching career: 1952–1998

Career history

Coaching
- 1952: Rodessa HS
- 1952–1955: Vivian HS
- 1955–1963: C. E. Byrd HS
- 1963–1964: Louisiana Tech (assistant)
- 1964–1974: Louisiana Tech
- 1974: New Orleans Jazz
- 1977–1978: Buffalo Braves (assistant)
- 1978–1979: Chicago Bulls (assistant)
- 1979: Chicago Bulls (interim HC)
- 1979–1980: Houston Rockets (assistant)
- 1980–1983: Detroit Pistons
- 1983–1984: Indiana Pacers (assistant)
- 1984–1985: San Antonio Spurs (assistant)
- 1989–1995: Phoenix Suns (assistant)
- 1995–1998: Miami Heat (assistant)

Career highlights
- 3× Gulf States champion (1967, 1970, 1971); 2× Gulf States Coach of the Year (1967, 1971)

Robert Scott Robertson III (February 1, 1930 – August 18, 2011) was an American basketball coach. He was the first coach for the New Orleans Jazz (now the Utah Jazz), and he later coached the Chicago Bulls and the Detroit Pistons. He also has a stint as assistant coach for the Indiana Pacers, San Antonio Spurs, Phoenix Suns, and the Miami Heat.

== Career ==
Robertson was born in Fort Smith in western Arkansas. As a sixth grader, he moved to Shreveport, Louisiana, where he played basketball and baseball for C. E. Byrd High School, from which he graduated in 1947. He attended the University of Texas at Austin, Texas, but graduated in 1951 from Louisiana Tech University in Ruston. He obtained a master's degree from the University of Arkansas at Fayetteville. After his graduation from Louisiana Tech, he played baseball in the Chicago White Sox organization before returning to basketball as a coach.

== Death and legacy ==
At the time of his death of lung cancer at the age of eighty-one, Robertson was residing in Ruston, the location of Louisiana Tech, with his wife the former Betty Lou Lancaster. He was survived by his daughters, Libby Robertson Power of Frisco, Texas, Claudia Robertson Fowler (husband Royal) of Franklin, Tennessee, and Vicki Robertson Page of Ruston. He had ten grandchildren.

Services were held on August 21, 2011, at the Trinity United Methodist Church in Ruston. Interment followed at Forest Lawn Memorial Park in Ruston.

In 2012, the Scotty Robertson Memorial Gymnasium was renovated and named in Robertson's honor.

== Head coaching record ==
=== High school ===
Robertson coached at C. E. Byrd High School for eight years, having accomplished a 163–91 record.

=== Collegiate ===
Record table
Season	Team	Overall	Conference	Standing	Postseason
Louisiana Tech (Gulf States Conference) (1964–1971)
1964–65	Louisiana Tech	10–11	6–4		
1965–66	Louisiana Tech	14–11	7–5		
1966–67	Louisiana Tech	20–8	11–1		NCAA Regional Runner-Up
1967–68	Louisiana Tech	16–9	6–6		
1968–69	Louisiana Tech	12–13	7–5		
1969–70	Louisiana Tech	17–5	9–3		
1970–71	Louisiana Tech	23–5	10–0	1st	NCAA Regional Third Place
Louisiana Tech (Southland Conference) (1971–1974)
1971–72	Louisiana Tech	25–1	8–0	1st	
1972–73	Louisiana Tech	20–6	10–2	T–1st	
1973–74	Louisiana Tech	8–13	0–0	–	
Louisiana Tech:		165–82	74–26		
Total:		165–82			
National champion Postseason invitational champion Conference regular season champion Conference regular season and conference tournament champion Division regular season champion Division regular season and conference tournament champion Conference tournament champion

=== Professional record ===
Legend
Regular season	G	Games coached	W	Games won	L	Games lost	W–L %	Win–loss %
Playoffs	PG	Playoff games	PW	Playoff wins	PL	Playoff losses	PW–L %	Playoff win–loss %

Team	Year	G	W	L	W–L%	Finish	PG	PW	PL	PW–L%	Result
New Orleans	1974–75	15	1	14	.067	(fired)	—	—	—	—	—
Chicago	1978–79	26	11	15	.423	5th in Midwest	—	—	—	—	Missed Playoffs
Detroit	1980–81	82	21	61	.256	6th in Central	—	—	—	—	Missed Playoffs
Detroit	1981–82	82	39	43	.476	3rd in Central	—	—	—	—	Missed Playoffs
Detroit	1982–83	82	37	45	.451	3rd in Central	—	—	—	—	Missed Playoffs
Career		287	109	178	.380		—	—	—	—	
