= 1982–83 Washington Bullets season =

NBA professional basketball team season

- Head coach: Gene Shue
- Arena: Capital Centre

Results
- Record: 42–40 (.512)
- Place: Division: 5th (Atlantic); Conference: 7th (Eastern)
- Playoff finish: Did not qualify
- Stats at Basketball Reference

Local media
- Television: WDCA
- Radio: WTOP

The 1982–83 Washington Bullets season was the Washington Bullets' 22nd season in the NBA and their 10th season in the city of Washington, D.C.

== Draft picks ==
Round	Pick	Player	Position	Nationality	College
2	25	Bryan Warrick		United States	St. Joseph's
2	41	Dwight Anderson	G	United States	Southern California
2	44	Mike Gibson		United States	South Carolina Upstate
3	58	Mike Largey		United States	Upsala
4	81	Dino Gregory		United States	California State-Long Beach
5	104	Clarence Dickerson		United States	Hawaii
5	112	Jerry Davis		United States	Detroit Mercy
6	127	Byron Williams		United States	Idaho State
7	150	Wendell Gibson		United States	South Carolina
8	173	Ken Luck		United States	Delaware
9	196	James Terry		United States	Howard
10	217	Donald Sinclair		United States	North Carolina Central

== Roster ==
1982–83 Washington Bullets roster
Players

Pos.	No.	Player	Height	Weight	DOB	From
F	42	Greg Ballard	6 ft 7 in (2.01 m)	215 lb (98 kg)		Oregon
C	40	Dave Batton	6 ft 10 in (2.08 m)	240 lb (109 kg)		Notre Dame
G/F	22	Don Collins	6 ft 6 in (1.98 m)	190 lb (86 kg)		Washington State
SF	23	Charles Davis	6 ft 7 in (2.01 m)	215 lb (98 kg)		Vanderbilt
F	35	Kevin Grevey	6 ft 5 in (1.96 m)	210 lb (95 kg)		Kentucky
PF	24	Spencer Haywood	6 ft 8 in (2.03 m)	225 lb (102 kg)		Detroit Mercy
PG	15	Frank Johnson	6 ft 1 in (1.85 m)	185 lb (84 kg)		Wake Forest
PF	44	Rick Mahorn	6 ft 10 in (2.08 m)	240 lb (109 kg)		Hampton
C	43	Jeff Ruland	6 ft 10 in (2.08 m)	240 lb (109 kg)		Iona
G	12	Carlos Terry	6 ft 5 in (1.96 m)	210 lb (95 kg)		Winston-Salem State

Coaches
Head coach
- Gene Shue

Legend
- (DP) Unsigned draft pick
- (FA) Free agent
- (S) Suspended
- Injured

== Regular season ==
=== Season standings ===
Atlantic Division	W	L	PCT	GB	Home	Road	Div
y-Philadelphia 76ers	65	17	.793	–	35–6	30–11	15–9
x-Boston Celtics	56	26	.683	9	33–8	23–18	14–10
x-New Jersey Nets	49	33	.598	16	30–11	19–22	11–13
x-New York Knicks	44	38	.537	21	26–15	18–23	10–14
Washington Bullets	42	40	.512	23	27–14	15–26	10–14

#	Eastern Conference				
#	Team	W	L	PCT	GB
1	z-Philadelphia 76ers	65	17	.793	–
2	y-Milwaukee Bucks	51	31	.622	14
3	x-Boston Celtics	56	26	.683	9
4	x-New Jersey Nets	49	33	.598	16
5	x-New York Knicks	44	38	.537	21
6	x-Atlanta Hawks	43	39	.524	22
7	Washington Bullets	42	40	.512	23
8	Detroit Pistons	37	45	.451	28
9	Chicago Bulls	28	54	.341	37
10	Cleveland Cavaliers	23	59	.280	42
11	Indiana Pacers	20	62	.244	45

z - clinched division title
y - clinched division title
x - clinched playoff spot

== Game log ==
=== Regular season ===
1982–83 game log
Total: 42–40 (Home: 27–14; Road: 15–26)
October: 1–1 (home: 0–0; road: 1–1)

Game	Date	Team	Score	High points	High rebounds	High assists	Location Attendance	Record
1	October 29	@ Indiana	L 90–93				Market Square Arena	0–1
2	October 30	@ Chicago	W 143–125				Chicago Stadium	1–1

November : 6–7 (home: 3–3; road: 3–4)

Game	Date	Team	Score	High points	High rebounds	High assists	Location Attendance	Record
3	November 2	@ Atlanta	L 88–105				The Omni	1–2
4	November 3	New Jersey	W 104–85				Capital Centre	2–2
5	November 5	@ Boston	L 97–104				Boston Garden	2–3
6	November 6	Indiana	W 119–115 (OT)				Capital Centre	3–3
7	November 9	Detroit	L 105–108				Capital Centre	3–4
8	November 12	New York	L 87–88				Capital Centre	3–5
9	November 14	@ Philadelphia	L 92–101				Spectrum	3–6
10	November 17	San Antonio	L 112–114				Capital Centre	3–7
11	November 19	@ Los Angeles	L 92–122				The Forum	3–8
12	November 20	@ San Diego	W 95–87				San Diego Sports Arena	4–8
13	November 24	@ Phoenix	W 106–93				Arizona Veterans Memorial Coliseum	5–8
14	November 26	@ Indiana	W 87–85				Market Square Arena	6–8
15	November 27	Portland	W 107–90				Capital Centre	7–8

December : 9–5 (home: 6–2; road: 3–3)

Game	Date	Team	Score	High points	High rebounds	High assists	Location Attendance	Record
16	December 1	New Jersey	L 99–105				Capital Centre	7–9
17	December 3	New York	W 105–98				Capital Centre	8–9
18	December 4	@ Dallas	W 115–105				Reunion Arena	9–9
19	December 8	@ New Jersey	L 95–98				Brendan Byrne Arena	9–10
20	December 9	Denver	W 98–90				Capital Centre	10–10
21	December 11	@ New York	L 79–85				Madison Square Garden	10–11
22	December 14	@ Chicago	W 108–102				Chicago Stadium	11–1
23	December 18	@ Detroit	W 119–110				Pontiac Silverdome	12–11
24	December 18	Philadelphia	W 100–97				Capital Centre	13–11
25	December 21	Cleveland	W 77–74				Capital Centre	14–11
26	December 23	@ New Jersey	L 90–97				Brendan Byrne Arena	14–12
27	December 25	Atlanta	L 91–97				Capital Centre	14–13
28	December 27	Chicago	W 89–87				Capital Centre	15–13
29	December 29	Milwaukee	W 94–87				Capital Centre	16–13

January : 4–11 (home: 4–4; road: 0–7)

Game	Date	Team	Score	High points	High rebounds	High assists	Location Attendance	Record
30	January 1	@ New York	L 77–98				Madison Square Garden	16–14
31	January 4	Dallas	W 92–84				Capital Centre	17–14
32	January 7	Philadelphia	L 89–106				Capital Centre	17–15
33	January 8	@ Cleveland	L 82–98				Richfield Coliseum	17–16
34	January 12	@ Detroit	L 100–116				Pontiac Silverdome	17–17
35	January 14	Golden State	L 104–116				Capital Centre	17–18
36	January 15	@ San Antonio	L 96–117				HemisFair Arena	17–19
37	January 18	@ Houston	L 98–100				The Summit	17–20
38	January 20	Cleveland	L 89–97				Capital Centre	17–21
39	January 21	@ Milwaukee	L 104–111				MECCA Arena	17–22
40	January 22	Chicago	L 86–95				Capital Centre	17–23
41	January 24	Boston	W 93–91				Capital Centre	18–23
42	January 26	@ Boston	L 99–125				Boston Garden	18–24
43	January 27	Seattle	W 99–86				Capital Centre	19–24
44	January 29	Phoenix	W 88–82				Capital Centre	20–24

February : 5–6 (home: 4–1; road: 1–5)

Game	Date	Team	Score	High points	High rebounds	High assists	Location Attendance	Record
45	February 2	Kansas City	L 115–117				Capital Centre	20–25
46	February 4	San Diego	W 100–93				Capital Centre	21–25
47	February 6	Indiana	W 103–99				Capital Centre	22–25
48	February 8	Boston	W 104–101 (OT)				Capital Centre	23–25
49	February 10	Houston	W 104–100				Capital Centre	24–25
All-Star Break
50	February 15	@ Golden State	L 93–111				Oakland–Alameda County Coliseum Arena	24–26
51	February 18	@ Seattle	L 112–115				Kingdome	24–27
52	February 20	@ Portland	L 95–104				Memorial Coliseum	24–28
53	February 22	@ Utah	W 99–98				Salt Palace Acord Arena	25–28
54	February 23	@ Kansas City	L 107–113				Kemper Arena	25–29
55	February 26	@ Denver	L 111–125				McNichols Sports Arena	25–30

March : 11–6 (home: 7–3; road: 4–3)

Game	Date	Team	Score	High points	High rebounds	High assists	Location Attendance	Record
56	March 1	Milwaukee	L 99–101				Capital Centre	25–31
57	March 3	@ Atlanta	L 89–91				The Omni	25–32
58	March 4	Los Angeles	W 96–93				Capital Centre	26–32
59	March 6	Atlanta	W 102–91				Capital Centre	27–32
60	March 9	Chicago	W 110–92				Capital Centre	28–32
61	March 12	Philadelphia	L 86–95				Capital Centre	28–33
62	March 13	@ Philadelphia	L 93–97				Spectrum	28–34
63	March 15	Cleveland	W 95–92 (OT)				Capital Centre	29–34
64	March 16	@ Atlanta	L 81–94 (OT)				The Omni	29–35
65	March 18	New York	L 100–106				Capital Centre	29–36
66	March 19	@ New York	W 96–90				Madison Square Garden	30–36
67	March 22	Utah	W 121–98				Capital Centre	31–36
68	March 24	@ Chicago	W 102–96				Chicago Stadium	32–36
69	March 25	@ Milwaukee	W 97–96				MECCA Arena	33–36
70	March 27	Indiana	W 120–101				Capital Centre	34–36
71	March 29	Milwaukee	W 94–81				Capital Centre	35–36
72	March 30	@ New Jersey	W 100–97				Brendan Byrne Arena	36–36

April : 6–4 (home: 3–1; road: 3–3)

Game	Date	Team	Score	High points	High rebounds	High assists	Location Attendance	Record
73	April 1	@ Indiana	W 123–109				Market Square Arena	37–36
74	April 2	Boston	L 117–120 (OT)				Capital Centre	37–37
75	April 5	New Jersey	W 95–89				Capital Centre	38–37
76	April 6	@ Detroit	L 96–107				Pontiac Silverdome	38–38
77	April 8	@ Boston	W 107–99				Boston Garden	39–38
78	April 9	Atlanta	W 100–78				Capital Centre	40–38
79	April 13	@ Philadelphia	W 95–76				Spectrum	41–38
80	April 14	@ Milwaukee	L 90–97				MECCA Arena	41–39
81	April 16	Detroit	W 102–95				Capital Centre	42–39
82	April 17	@ Cleveland	L 105–118				Richfield Coliseum	42–40

1982–83 schedule

== See also ==
- 1982–83 NBA season
