= 1982–83 Indiana Pacers season =

NBA professional basketball team season

- Head coach: Jack McKinney
- Arena: Market Square Arena

Results
- Record: 20–62 (.244)
- Place: Division: 6th (Central); Conference: 11th (Eastern)
- Playoff finish: Did not qualify
- Stats at Basketball Reference

Local media
- Television: WTTV
- Radio: WNDE

The 1982–83 Indiana Pacers season was Indiana's seventh season in the NBA and 16th season as a franchise.

== Offseason ==
=== Draft picks ===
This table only lists picks through the second round.

Round	Pick	Player	Position	Nationality	College
1	8	Clark Kellogg	PF	United States	Ohio State
2	40	Guy Morgan	SG	United States	Wake Forest
2	43	Jose Slaughter	SG	United States	Portland

== Roster ==
Indiana Pacers roster
Players

Pos.	No.	Player	Height	Weight	DOB	From
PF	52	Brad Branson	6 ft 10 in (2.08 m)	220 lb (100 kg)		SMU
SF	11	Marty Byrnes	6 ft 7 in (2.01 m)	215 lb (98 kg)		Syracuse
SG	12	Butch Carter	6 ft 5 in (1.96 m)	180 lb (82 kg)		Indiana
PG	44	John Duren	6 ft 3 in (1.91 m)	195 lb (88 kg)		Georgetown
SF	24	George Johnson	6 ft 7 in (2.01 m)	210 lb (95 kg)		St. John's
PF	33	Clark Kellogg	6 ft 7 in (2.01 m)	225 lb (102 kg)		Ohio State
SG	25	Billy Knight	6 ft 6 in (1.98 m)	195 lb (88 kg)		Pittsburgh
PF	40	Russ Schoene	6 ft 10 in (2.08 m)	210 lb (95 kg)		Chattanooga
PG	14	Jerry Sichting	6 ft 1 in (1.85 m)	168 lb (76 kg)		Purdue
SG	21	Jose Slaughter	6 ft 5 in (1.96 m)	205 lb (93 kg)		Portland
C	32	Herb Williams	6 ft 10 in (2.08 m)	242 lb (110 kg)		Ohio State

Coaches
Head coach
- Jack McKinney
Assistant(s)
- George Irvine

Legend
- (DP) Unsigned draft pick
- (FA) Free agent
- (S) Suspended
- Injured

== Regular season ==
=== Season standings ===
Central Division	W	L	PCT	GB	Home	Road	Div
y-Milwaukee Bucks	51	31	.622	–	31–10	20–21	22–7
x-Atlanta Hawks	43	39	.524	8	26–15	17–24	21–8
Detroit Pistons	37	45	.451	14	23–18	14–27	19–11
Chicago Bulls	28	54	.341	23	18–23	10–31	13–17
Cleveland Cavaliers	23	59	.280	28	15–26	8–33	8–22
Indiana Pacers	20	62	.244	31	14–27	6–35	6–24

#	Eastern Conference				
#	Team	W	L	PCT	GB
1	z-Philadelphia 76ers	65	17	.793	–
2	y-Milwaukee Bucks	51	31	.622	14
3	x-Boston Celtics	56	26	.683	9
4	x-New Jersey Nets	49	33	.598	16
5	x-New York Knicks	44	38	.537	21
6	x-Atlanta Hawks	43	39	.524	22
7	Washington Bullets	42	40	.512	23
8	Detroit Pistons	37	45	.451	28
9	Chicago Bulls	28	54	.341	37
10	Cleveland Cavaliers	23	59	.280	42
11	Indiana Pacers	20	62	.244	45

z - clinched division title
y - clinched division title
x - clinched playoff spot

== Player statistics ==
=== Ragular season ===
Player	POS	GP	GS	MP	REB	AST	STL	BLK	PTS	MPG	RPG	APG	SPG	BPG	PPG
George L. Johnson	SF	82	64	2,297	545	220	77	53	951	28.0	6.6	2.7	.9	.6	11.6
John Duren	PG	82	24	1,433	107	200	66	5	369	17.5	1.3	2.4	.8	.1	4.5
Clark Kellogg	PF	81	81	2,761	860	223	141	43	1,625	34.1	10.6	2.8	1.7	.5	20.1
Butch Carter	SG	81	28	1,716	150	194	78	13	849	21.2	1.9	2.4	1.0	.2	10.5
Billy Knight	SG	80	54	2,262	324	192	66	8	1,370	28.3	4.1	2.4	.8	.1	17.1
Marty Byrnes	SF	80	12	1,436	191	179	41	6	391	18.0	2.4	2.2	.5	.1	4.9
Herb Williams	C	78	74	2,513	583	262	54	171	1,315	32.2	7.5	3.4	.7	2.2	16.9
Jerry Sichting	PG	78	58	2,435	155	433	104	2	727	31.2	2.0	5.6	1.3	.0	9.3
Jose Slaughter	SG	63	1	515	68	52	36	7	225	8.2	1.1	.8	.6	.1	3.6
Brad Branson	PF	62	2	680	173	46	27	26	338	11.0	2.8	.7	.4	.4	5.5
Clemon Johnson^{†}	C	51	7	1,216	319	115	51	63	493	23.8	6.3	2.3	1.0	1.2	9.7
Russ Schoene^{†}	PF	31	5	520	101	27	12	14	243	16.8	3.3	.9	.4	.5	7.8
Guy Morgan	SG	8	0	46	17	7	2	0	15	5.8	2.1	.9	.3	.0	1.9

- ^{†} Denotes player spent time with another team in the season. Stats reflect time with the Pacers only.

== Awards and records ==
- Clark Kellogg, NBA All-Rookie Team 1st Team

== See also ==
- 1982-83 NBA season
