= 1982–83 Milwaukee Bucks season =

NBA professional basketball team season

- Division champions
- Head coach: Don Nelson
- General manager: Don Nelson
- Owner: Jim Fitzgerald
- Arena: MECCA Arena

Results
- Record: 51–31 (.622)
- Place: Division: 1st (Central); Conference: 2nd (Eastern)
- Playoff finish: Conference finals (lost to 76ers 1–4)
- Stats at Basketball Reference

The 1982-83 Milwaukee Bucks season was the Bucks' 15th season in the NBA.

== Draft picks ==
Round	Pick	Player	Position	Nationality	College
1	20	Paul Pressey	SF	United States	Tulsa
2	27	Fred Roberts	PF	United States	Brigham Young
4	89	Jerry Beck	SF/PF	United States	Middle Tennessee State
6	135	Tony Carr		United States	Wisconsin-Eau Claire
7	158	Bobby Austin		United States	Cincinnati
8	181	Bryan Leonard		United States	Illinois
9	202	Robert Tate		United States	Idaho State
10	223	Bob Coenen		United States	Wisconsin-Eau Claire

== Roster ==
1982–83 Milwaukee Bucks roster
Players

Pos.	No.	Player	Height	Weight	DOB	From
G/F	2	Junior Bridgeman	6 ft 5 in (1.96 m)	210 lb (95 kg)	1953–09–17	Louisville
F/C	42	Harvey Catchings	6 ft 9 in (2.06 m)	218 lb (99 kg)	1951–09–02	Hardin–Simmons
F/C	36	Dave Cowens	6 ft 9 in (2.06 m)	230 lb (104 kg)	1948–10–25	Florida State
G	15	Charlie Criss	5 ft 8 in (1.73 m)	165 lb (75 kg)	1948–11–06	New Mexico State
PG	12	Phil Ford	6 ft 2 in (1.88 m)	175 lb (79 kg)	1956–02–09	North Carolina
SF	8	Marques Johnson	6 ft 7 in (2.01 m)	218 lb (99 kg)	1956–02–08	UCLA
C	16	Bob Lanier	6 ft 11 in (2.11 m)	250 lb (113 kg)	1948–09–10	St. Bonaventure
C	53	Alton Lister	7 ft 0 in (2.13 m)	240 lb (109 kg)	1958–10–01	Arizona State
C	45	Paul Mokeski	7 ft 0 in (2.13 m)	250 lb (113 kg)	1957–01–03	Kansas
PG	4	Sidney Moncrief	6 ft 3 in (1.91 m)	180 lb (82 kg)	1957–09–21	Arkansas
G/F	25	Paul Pressey	6 ft 5 in (1.96 m)	185 lb (84 kg)	1958–12–24	Tulsa
SG	32	Brian Winters	6 ft 4 in (1.93 m)	185 lb (84 kg)	1952–03–01	South Carolina

Coaches
Head coach
- Don Nelson
Assistant(s)
- John Killilea
- Garry St. Jean

Legend
- (DP) Unsigned draft pick
- (FA) Free agent
- (S) Suspended
- Injured

== Regular season ==
=== Season standings ===
Central Division	W	L	PCT	GB	Home	Road	Div
y-Milwaukee Bucks	51	31	.622	–	31–10	20–21	22–7
x-Atlanta Hawks	43	39	.524	8	26–15	17–24	21–8
Detroit Pistons	37	45	.451	14	23–18	14–27	19–11
Chicago Bulls	28	54	.341	23	18–23	10–31	13–17
Cleveland Cavaliers	23	59	.280	28	15–26	8–33	8–22
Indiana Pacers	20	62	.244	31	14–27	6–35	6–24

#	Eastern Conference				
#	Team	W	L	PCT	GB
1	z-Philadelphia 76ers	65	17	.793	–
2	y-Milwaukee Bucks	51	31	.622	14
3	x-Boston Celtics	56	26	.683	9
4	x-New Jersey Nets	49	33	.598	16
5	x-New York Knicks	44	38	.537	21
6	x-Atlanta Hawks	43	39	.524	22
7	Washington Bullets	42	40	.512	23
8	Detroit Pistons	37	45	.451	28
9	Chicago Bulls	28	54	.341	37
10	Cleveland Cavaliers	23	59	.280	42
11	Indiana Pacers	20	62	.244	45

z - clinched division title
y - clinched division title
x - clinched playoff spot

=== Game log ===
1982–83 game log
Total: 51–31 (home: 0–0; road: 0–0)
October: 2–0 (home: 1–0; road: 1–0)

Game	Date	Team	Score	High points	High rebounds	High assists	Location Attendance	Record
1	October 30, 1982	New York	W 108–86				MECCA Arena	1–0
2	October 31, 1982	@ Cleveland	W 119—95	Junior Bridgeman (17)			Coliseum at Richfield	2–0

November: 5–4 (home: 2–2; road: 3–2)

Game	Date	Team	Score	High points	High rebounds	High assists	Location Attendance	Record
3	November 2, 1982	@ Kansas City	L 112–119				Kemper Arena	2–1
4	November 4, 1982	@ Atlanta	W 104—100				The Omni	3–1
5	November 5, 1982	San Diego	W 130–99				MECCA Arena	4–1
5	November 7, 1982	Seattle	L 90–102				MECCA Arena	4–2
6	November 10, 1982	@ Boston	W 105—101				Boston Garden	5–2
7	November 12, 1982	@ Detroit	L 100–111				Pontiac Silverdome	5–3
8	November 14, 1982	Boston	L 98–100				MECCA Arena	5–4
9	November 16, 1982	Indiana	W 115–103				MECCA Arena	6–4
10	November 18, 1982	@ New York	L 89—77				Madison Square Garden	7–4

December: 0–0 (home: 0–0; road: 0–0)

Game	Date	Team	Score	High points	High rebounds	High assists	Location Attendance	Record

January: 0–0 (home: 0–0; road: 0–0)

Game	Date	Team	Score	High points	High rebounds	High assists	Location Attendance	Record

February: 0–0 (home: 0–0; road: 0–0)

Game	Date	Team	Score	High points	High rebounds	High assists	Location Attendance	Record

March: 0–0 (home: 0–0; road: 0–0)

Game	Date	Team	Score	High points	High rebounds	High assists	Location Attendance	Record

April: 0–0 (home: 0–0; road: 0–0)

Game	Date	Team	Score	High points	High rebounds	High assists	Location Attendance	Record

1982–83 schedule

== Playoffs ==
1983 playoff game log
Conference semifinals: 4–0 (home: 2–0; road: 2–0)

Game	Date	Team	Score	High points	High rebounds	High assists	Location Attendance	Series
1	April 27	@ Boston	W 116–95	Sidney Moncrief (22)	Bob Lanier (10)	Marques Johnson (5)	Boston Garden; 15,320	1–0
2	April 29	@ Boston	W 95–91	Sidney Moncrief (20)	Marques Johnson (9)	Sidney Moncrief (4)	Boston Garden; 15,320	2–0
3	May 1	Boston	W 107–99	Sidney Moncrief (26)	Junior Bridgeman (10)	Bob Lanier (6)	MECCA Arena; 11,052	3–0
4	May 2	Boston	W 107–93	Marques Johnson (33)	Alton Lister (11)	Marques Johnson (6)	MECCA Arena; 11,052	4–0

Conference finals: 1–4 (home: 1–1; road: 0–3)

Game	Date	Team	Score	High points	High rebounds	High assists	Location Attendance	Series
1	May 8	@ Philadelphia	L 109–111 (OT)	Marques Johnson (30)	Bob Lanier (9)	Moncrief, Lanier (6)	Spectrum; 18,482	0–1
2	May 11	@ Philadelphia	L 81–87	Marques Johnson (25)	Marques Johnson (11)	Lanier, Winters (4)	Spectrum; 18,482	0–2
3	May 14	Philadelphia	L 96–104	Junior Bridgeman (24)	Sidney Moncrief (10)	Brian Winters (7)	MECCA Arena; 11,052	0–3
4	May 15	Philadelphia	W 100–94	Marques Johnson (19)	Marques Johnson (10)	Marques Johnson (8)	MECCA Arena; 11,052	1–3
5	May 18	@ Philadelphia	L 103–115	Marques Johnson (21)	Alton Lister (12)	Junior Bridgeman (5)	Spectrum; 18,482	1–4

1983 schedule

== Player statistics ==
Legend
GP	Games played	GS	Games started	MPG	Minutes per game
FG%	Field-goal percentage	3P%	3-point field-goal percentage	FT%	Free-throw percentage
RPG	Rebounds per game	APG	Assists per game	SPG	Steals per game
BPG	Blocks per game	PPG	Points per game

Player statistics source:

=== Season ===
Player	GP	GS	MPG	FG%	3FG%	FT%	RPG	APG	SPG	BPG	PPG
Sidney Moncrief	76	76	35.7	52.4	10.0	82.6	5.8	3.9	1.5	0.3	22.5
Marques Johnson	80	80	35.7	50.9	20.0	73.5	7.0	4.5	1.3	0.7	21.4
Junior Bridgeman	70	5	26.5	49.2	7.7	83.7	3.5	3.0	0.6	0.1	14.4
Mickey Johnson	6	0	25.5	45.5	0.0	77.8	4.2	1.8	0.2	0.3	11.2
Bob Lanier	39	35	25.1	49.1	0.0	68.4	5.1	2.7	0.9	0.6	10.7
Brian Winters	57	12	23.9	43.4	32.4	85.9	1.9	2.7	0.8	0.1	10.6
Alton Lister	80	37	23.6	52.9	0.0	53.7	7.1	1.4	0.6	2.2	8.4
Dave Cowens	40	34	25.4	44.4	0.0	82.5	6.9	2.1	0.8	0.4	8.1
Phil Ford	70	56	20.7	47.1	12.5	79.6	1.4	3.6	0.7	0.0	6.8
Paul Pressey	79	18	19.3	45.7	11.1	59.7	3.6	2.6	1.3	0.6	6.7
Charlie Criss	66	0	14.0	45.1	19.4	89.5	1.2	1.9	0.4	0.0	6.2
Steve Mix	57	20	13.9	48.7	25.0	85.1	2.4	1.2	0.6	0.1	6.0
Harvey Catchings	74	33	21.0	45.7	0.0	67.4	5.5	1.0	0.4	2.0	3.3
Armond Hill	14	3	12.1	53.8	0.0	81.8	1.4	1.9	0.6	0.0	3.3
Paul Mokeski	50	1	11.8	46.0	0.0	81.0	2.4	0.5	0.2	0.4	3.2
Sam Pellom	4	0	5.0	40.0	0.0	0.0	2.0	0.0	0.0	0.0	2.0

=== Playoffs ===
Player	GP	GS	MPG	FG%	3FG%	FT%	RPG	APG	SPG	BPG	PPG
Marques Johnson	9		42.4	48.6	0.0	65.1	8.0	4.2	0.9	0.8	22.0
Sidney Moncrief	9		41.9	43.7	0.0	75.4	6.7	3.7	2.0	0.3	18.9
Junior Bridgeman	9		34.2	46.9	40.0	93.3	5.0	3.1	1.1	0.2	16.9
Bob Lanier	9		27.8	57.3	0.0	60.0	7.0	2.6	0.6	1.6	13.7
Brian Winters	9		26.7	42.9	27.3	82.4	2.4	3.6	0.7	0.4	9.9
Alton Lister	9		22.9	42.9	0.0	80.0	6.8	1.2	1.0	1.7	6.4
Charlie Criss	9		12.9	44.1	0.0	94.4	1.6	1.3	1.0	0.0	5.2
Paul Pressey	9		16.7	40.4	0.0	40.0	3.7	1.6	1.0	0.7	5.1
Phil Ford	2		2.5	0.0	0.0	100.0	0.0	0.5	0.0	0.0	3.0
Harvey Catchings	9		15.4	47.4	0.0	100.0	4.2	0.4	0.2	1.1	2.3
Paul Mokeski	4		3.0	50.0	0.0	0.0	0.5	0.3	0.3	0.0	1.0

== Awards and records ==
- Sidney Moncrief, NBA Defensive Player of the Year Award
- Sidney Moncrief, All-NBA First Team
- Sidney Moncrief, NBA All-Defensive First Team
- Don Nelson, NBA Coach of the Year Award

== Transactions ==
=== Trades ===
June 28, 1982
To Milwaukee Bucks----
- 1982 2nd round pick (Fred Roberts)
To Dallas Mavericks----
- Pat Cummings
September 9, 1982
To Milwaukee Bucks----
- Dave Cowens
To Boston Celtics----
- Quinn Buckner
November 12, 1982
To Milwaukee Bucks----
- Phil Ford
To New Jersey Nets----
- Mickey Johnson
- Fred Roberts

== See also ==
- 1982-83 NBA season
