= 1982–83 New York Knicks season =

Season of National Basketball Association team the New York Knicks

- Head coach: Hubie Brown
- General manager: Dave DeBusschere
- Owners: Gulf+Western
- Arena: Madison Square Garden

Results
- Record: 44–38 (.537)
- Place: Division: 4th (Atlantic); Conference: 5th (Eastern)
- Playoff finish: East Semifinals (lost to 76ers 0–4)
- Stats at Basketball Reference

Local media
- Television: WOR-TV (Marv Albert, Butch Beard); MSG Network (Jim Karvellas, Butch Beard)
- Radio: WNEW (Marv Albert, John Andariese)

The 1982–83 New York Knicks season was the 37th season for the team in the National Basketball Association (NBA). In the regular season, the Knicks started off by losing their first seven games of the season, but improved during the second half of their schedule. They finished in fourth place in the Atlantic Division with a 44–38 win–loss record, and qualified for the NBA playoffs. New York defeated the New Jersey Nets 2–0 in the best-of-three first round of the playoffs and advanced to the Eastern Conference Semifinals, where they were swept in four games by the eventual NBA champion Philadelphia 76ers.

== NBA draft ==
Note: This is not an extensive list; it only covers the first and second rounds, and any other players picked by the franchise that played at least one game in the league.

Round	Pick	Player	Position	Nationality	School/Club team
1	6	Trent Tucker	G	United States	Minnesota
2	29	Scott Hastings	F–C	United States	Arkansas
2	34	Vince Taylor	F	United States	Duke

== Roster ==
1982–83 New York Knicks roster
Players

Pos.	No.	Player	Height	Weight	DOB	From
C	25	Bill Cartwright	7 ft 1 in (2.16 m)	245 lb (111 kg)		San Francisco
PF	26	Mike Davis	6 ft 10 in (2.08 m)	230 lb (104 kg)		Maryland
SG	18	Ernie Grunfeld	6 ft 6 in (1.98 m)	210 lb (95 kg)		Tennessee
F	30	Bernard King	6 ft 7 in (2.01 m)	197 lb (89 kg)		Tennessee
SF	55	Louis Orr	6 ft 8 in (2.03 m)	175 lb (79 kg)		Syracuse
F	23	Leonard Robinson	6 ft 7 in (2.01 m)	225 lb (102 kg)		Tennessee State
SG	6	Trent Tucker	6 ft 5 in (1.96 m)	193 lb (88 kg)		Minnesota
C	40	Marvin Webster	7 ft 1 in (2.16 m)	225 lb (102 kg)		Morgan State
G	44	Paul Westphal	6 ft 4 in (1.93 m)	195 lb (88 kg)		USC

Coaches
Head coach
- Hubie Brown
Assistant(s)
- Richie Adubato
- Mike Fratello

Legend
- (DP) Unsigned draft pick
- (FA) Free agent
- (S) Suspended
- Injured

== Regular season ==
=== Season standings ===
Atlantic Division	W	L	PCT	GB	Home	Road	Div
y-Philadelphia 76ers	65	17	.793	–	35–6	30–11	15–9
x-Boston Celtics	56	26	.683	9	33–8	23–18	14–10
x-New Jersey Nets	49	33	.598	16	30–11	19–22	11–13
x-New York Knicks	44	38	.537	21	26–15	18–23	10–14
Washington Bullets	42	40	.512	23	27–14	15–26	10–14

#	Eastern Conference				
#	Team	W	L	PCT	GB
1	z-Philadelphia 76ers	65	17	.793	–
2	y-Milwaukee Bucks	51	31	.622	14
3	x-Boston Celtics	56	26	.683	9
4	x-New Jersey Nets	49	33	.598	16
5	x-New York Knicks	44	38	.537	21
6	x-Atlanta Hawks	43	39	.524	22
7	Washington Bullets	42	40	.512	23
8	Detroit Pistons	37	45	.451	28
9	Chicago Bulls	28	54	.341	37
10	Cleveland Cavaliers	23	59	.280	42
11	Indiana Pacers	20	62	.244	45

z – clinched division title
y – clinched division title
x – clinched playoff spot

== Playoffs ==
1983 playoff game log
First Round: 2–0 (home: 1–0; road: 1–0)

Game	Date	Team	Score	High points	High rebounds	High assists	Location Attendance	Series
1	April 20	@ New Jersey	W 118–107	Bernard King (40)	Marvin Webster (11)	Rory Sparrow (7)	Brendan Byrne Arena; 15,672	1–0
2	April 21	New Jersey	W 105–99	Truck Robinson (22)	Truck Robinson (13)	Paul Westphal (7)	Madison Square Garden; 19,591	2–0

Conference semifinals: 0–4 (home: 0–2; road: 0–2)

Game	Date	Team	Score	High points	High rebounds	High assists	Location Attendance	Series
1	April 24	@ Philadelphia	L 102–112	Bill Cartwright (17)	Bill Cartwright (8)	Rory Sparrow (10)	Spectrum; 14,375	0–1
2	April 27	@ Philadelphia	L 91–98	Truck Robinson (22)	Truck Robinson (14)	Rory Sparrow (8)	Spectrum; 15,829	0–2
3	April 30	Philadelphia	L 105–107	Bernard King (21)	Truck Robinson (15)	Rory Sparrow (6)	Madison Square Garden; 17,735	0–3
4	May 1	Philadelphia	L 102–105	Bernard King (35)	Truck Robinson (15)	Sparrow, Westphal (8)	Madison Square Garden; 15,457	0–4

1983 schedule
