= 1982–83 Detroit Pistons season =

NBA team season

- Head coach: Scotty Robertson
- General manager: Jack McCloskey
- Owners: William Davidson
- Arena: Pontiac Silverdome

Results
- Record: 37–45 (.451)
- Place: Division: 3rd (Central); Conference: 8th (Eastern)
- Playoff finish: Did not qualify
- Stats at Basketball Reference

The 1982–83 Detroit Pistons season was the Detroit Pistons' 35th season in the NBA and 26th season in the city of Detroit. The team played at the Pontiac Silverdome in suburban Pontiac, Michigan.

Expectations were high with the Pistons entering the season with hopes for continued improvement and a playoff berth, having improved from 16 to 21 to 39 wins in the previous three seasons, but the team regressed, finishing 37–45 (.451), 3rd in the Central Division. The team was led on the season by guard Isiah Thomas (22.9 ppg, 7.8 apg, NBA All-Star), center Bill Laimbeer (13.6 ppg, 12.1 rpg, NBA All-Star) and forward Kelly Tripucka (26.5 ppg).

With the disappointing record and frequent clashes with team leader Thomas, the team fired coach Scotty Robertson at the end of the season. General Manager Jack McCloskey met with Robertson to deliver the news, "'I was very disappointed and very shocked,' Robertson said. 'I thought Jack and I would discuss various aspects of the team and go on from there. He came in at noon and we talked for five minutes. 'We're going to make a change,' he said. He gave me two reasons. He said he didn't think the team had progressed enough this year and he said he didn't think our defense was as good as it should have been. I told him I agreed with him on both points. But where we had a difference of opinion was why. He thought it was my fault and I thought it was the set of circumstances.'" The team would hire Chuck Daly as his replacement for the 1983-84 Detroit Pistons season.

== Draft picks ==
Round	Pick	Player	Position	Nationality	College
1	9	Cliff Levingston	PF	United States	Wichita State
1	18	Ricky Pierce	SG/SF	United States	Rice
4	78	Walker Russell	SG	United States	Western Michigan

== Roster ==
Detroit Pistons roster
Players

Pos.	No.	Player	Height	Weight	DOB	From
C	54	Kent Benson	6 ft 10 in (2.08 m)	235 lb (107 kg)		Indiana
SG	15	Vinnie Johnson	6 ft 2 in (1.88 m)	200 lb (91 kg)		Baylor
SG	34	Jim Johnstone	6 ft 11 in (2.11 m)	245 lb (111 kg)		Wake Forest
PF	34	Edgar Jones	6 ft 10 in (2.08 m)	225 lb (102 kg)		Nevada
C	40	Bill Laimbeer	6 ft 11 in (2.11 m)	245 lb (111 kg)		Notre Dame
PF	53	Cliff Levingston	6 ft 8 in (2.03 m)	210 lb (95 kg)		Wichita State
SG	25	John Long	6 ft 5 in (1.96 m)	195 lb (88 kg)		Detroit Mercy
SF	34	Scott May	6 ft 7 in (2.01 m)	215 lb (98 kg)		Indiana
C	44	Tom Owens	6 ft 10 in (2.08 m)	215 lb (98 kg)		USC
SG	22	Ricky Pierce	6 ft 4 in (1.93 m)	205 lb (93 kg)		Rice
SG	33	Walker Russell	6 ft 5 in (1.96 m)	195 lb (88 kg)		Western Michigan
PF	32	Jim Smith	6 ft 9 in (2.06 m)	225 lb (102 kg)		Ohio State
PF	24	Ray Tolbert	6 ft 9 in (2.06 m)	225 lb (102 kg)		Indiana
PG	11	Isiah Thomas	6 ft 1 in (1.85 m)	180 lb (82 kg)		Indiana
F	7	Kelly Tripucka	6 ft 6 in (1.98 m)	220 lb (100 kg)		Notre Dame
G/F	41	Terry Tyler	6 ft 7 in (2.01 m)	215 lb (98 kg)		Detroit Mercy
F	34	James Wilkes	6 ft 7 in (2.01 m)	195 lb (88 kg)		UCLA
C	34	Jim Zoet	7 ft 1 in (2.16 m)	240 lb (109 kg)		Kent State

Coaches
Head coach
- Scotty Robertson

Legend
- (DP) Unsigned draft pick
- (FA) Free agent
- (S) Suspended
- Injured

== Regular season ==
=== Season standings ===
Central Division	W	L	PCT	GB	Home	Road	Div
y-Milwaukee Bucks	51	31	.622	–	31–10	20–21	22–7
x-Atlanta Hawks	43	39	.524	8	26–15	17–24	21–8
Detroit Pistons	37	45	.451	14	23–18	14–27	19–11
Chicago Bulls	28	54	.341	23	18–23	10–31	13–17
Cleveland Cavaliers	23	59	.280	28	15–26	8–33	8–22
Indiana Pacers	20	62	.244	31	14–27	6–35	6–24

#	Eastern Conference				
#	Team	W	L	PCT	GB
1	z-Philadelphia 76ers	65	17	.793	–
2	y-Milwaukee Bucks	51	31	.622	14
3	x-Boston Celtics	56	26	.683	9
4	x-New Jersey Nets	49	33	.598	16
5	x-New York Knicks	44	38	.537	21
6	x-Atlanta Hawks	43	39	.524	22
7	Washington Bullets	42	40	.512	23
8	Detroit Pistons	37	45	.451	28
9	Chicago Bulls	28	54	.341	37
10	Cleveland Cavaliers	23	59	.280	42
11	Indiana Pacers	20	62	.244	45

z – clinched division title
y – clinched division title
x – clinched playoff spot

== Awards and records ==
- Isiah Thomas, All-NBA Second Team

== See also ==
- 1982-83 NBA season
