= 1982–83 New Jersey Nets season =

NBA professional basketball team season

- Head coach: Larry Brown; Bill Blair
- Arena: Brendan Byrne Arena

Results
- Record: 49–33 (.598)
- Place: Division: 3rd (Atlantic); Conference: 4th (Eastern)
- Playoff finish: First round (lost to Knicks 0–2)
- Stats at Basketball Reference

The 1982–83 New Jersey Nets season was the Nets' seventh season in the NBA. With 49 wins and 33 losses, it was also their best record since the ABA–NBA merger—a mark that would stand until the 2001–02 season.

== Draft picks ==
Round	Pick	Player	Position	Nationality	College
1	13	Sleepy Floyd	PG	United States	Georgetown
1	21	Eddie Phillips	PF	United States	Alabama
3	59	Jimmy Black	PG	United States	North Carolina
4	80	James Griffin		United States	Illinois
4	82	Tony Brown	SG/SF	United States	Arkansas
5	105	Chris Giles		United States	Alabama-Birmingham
6	128	Mel Daniel		United States	Furman
7	151	Tony Anderson		United States	UCLA
8	174	Otis Jackson		United States	Memphis
9	197	Gary Johnson		United States	Oral Roberts
10	218	Sean Tuohy	PG	United States	Mississippi

== Roster ==
1982–83 New Jersey Nets roster
Players

Pos.	No.	Player	Height	Weight	DOB	From
SG	10	Otis Birdsong	6 ft 3 in (1.91 m)	190 lb (86 kg)	1955-12-09	Houston
PG	12	Darwin Cook	6 ft 3 in (1.91 m)	184 lb (83 kg)	1958-08-06	Portland
C	53	Darryl Dawkins	6 ft 11 in (2.11 m)	251 lb (114 kg)	1957-01-11	Maynard Evans HS (FL)
C	44	Len Elmore	6 ft 9 in (2.06 m)	220 lb (100 kg)	1952-03-28	Maryland
C	42	Mike Gminski	6 ft 11 in (2.11 m)	250 lb (113 kg)	1959-08-03	Duke
SF	55	Albert King	6 ft 6 in (1.98 m)	190 lb (86 kg)	1959-12-17	Maryland
SF	31	Mike O'Koren	6 ft 7 in (2.01 m)	207 lb (94 kg)	1958-02-07	North Carolina
SF	51	Eddie Phillips	6 ft 7 in (2.01 m)	225 lb (102 kg)	1961-09-29	Alabama
PG	20	Micheal Ray Richardson	6 ft 5 in (1.96 m)	189 lb (86 kg)	1955-04-11	Montana
PG	1	Foots Walker	6 ft 0 in (1.83 m)	184 lb (83 kg)	1951-05-21	West Georgia
PF	52	Buck Williams	6 ft 8 in (2.03 m)	215 lb (98 kg)	1954-10-14	Maryland
SF	34	Bill Willoughby	6 ft 8 in (2.03 m)	205 lb (93 kg)	1957-05-20	Dwight Morrow HS (NJ)

Coaches
Head coach
- Bill Blair
Assistant(s)
- Mike Schuler

Legend
- (DP) Unsigned draft pick
- (FA) Free agent
- (S) Suspended
- Injured

Roster

== Regular season ==
=== Season standings ===
Atlantic Division	W	L	PCT	GB	Home	Road	Div
y-Philadelphia 76ers	65	17	.793	–	35–6	30–11	15–9
x-Boston Celtics	56	26	.683	9	33–8	23–18	14–10
x-New Jersey Nets	49	33	.598	16	30–11	19–22	11–13
x-New York Knicks	44	38	.537	21	26–15	18–23	10–14
Washington Bullets	42	40	.512	23	27–14	15–26	10–14

#	Eastern Conference				
#	Team	W	L	PCT	GB
1	z-Philadelphia 76ers	65	17	.793	–
2	y-Milwaukee Bucks	51	31	.622	14
3	x-Boston Celtics	56	26	.683	9
4	x-New Jersey Nets	49	33	.598	16
5	x-New York Knicks	44	38	.537	21
6	x-Atlanta Hawks	43	39	.524	22
7	Washington Bullets	42	40	.512	23
8	Detroit Pistons	37	45	.451	28
9	Chicago Bulls	28	54	.341	37
10	Cleveland Cavaliers	23	59	.280	42
11	Indiana Pacers	20	62	.244	45

z – clinched division title
y – clinched division title
x – clinched playoff spot

== Playoffs ==
1983 playoff game log
First Round: 0–2 (home: 0–1; road: 0–1)

Game	Date	Team	Score	High points	High rebounds	High assists	Location Attendance	Series
1	April 20	New York	L 107–118	Albert King (17)	Buck Williams (13)	Cook, Birdsong (6)	Brendan Byrne Arena; 15,672	0–1
2	April 21	@ New York	L 99–105	Albert King (25)	Buck Williams (10)	Foots Walker (6)	Madison Square Garden; 19,591	0–2

1983 schedule

== Awards and records ==
- Buck Williams, All-NBA Second Team

== See also ==
- 1982–83 NBA season
