= 1982–83 Boston Celtics season =

NBA team basketball season

- Head coach: Bill Fitch
- General manager: Red Auerbach
- Arena: Boston Garden; Hartford Civic Center

Results
- Record: 56–26 (.683)
- Place: Division: 2nd (Atlantic); Conference: 3rd (Eastern)
- Playoff finish: Conference semifinals (lost to Bucks 0–4)
- Stats at Basketball Reference

Local media
- Television: PRISM New England, WBZ, WTXX
- Radio: WRKO, WTIC

The 1982–83 Boston Celtics season was the 37th season of the Boston Celtics in the National Basketball Association (NBA).

On March 30, 1983, Larry Bird scored 53 points against the Indiana Pacers, surpassing Sam Jones's Celtics single game scoring record set in 1965. The team was swept by the Milwaukee Bucks in the conference semifinals, and coach Bill Fitch left his post as head coach following the season.

Ownership also changed hands following this season, with Harry T. Mangurian Jr. putting the team up for sale due to poor relations with the arena owners.

== Draft picks ==
| Round | Pick | Player | Position | Nationality | College |
|---|---|---|---|---|---|
| 1 | 23 | Darren Tillis | C | United States | Cleveland State |
| 9 | 205 | Panagiotis Giannakis | PG | Greece | Ionikos Nikaias |

== Roster ==
Boston Celtics roster
Players

| Pos. | No. | Player | Height | Weight | DOB | From |
|---|---|---|---|---|---|---|
| G | 44 | Danny Ainge | 6 ft 4 in (1.93 m) | 175 lb (79 kg) | | BYU |
| G | 7 | Nate Archibald | 6 ft 1 in (1.85 m) | 150 lb (68 kg) | | UTEP |
| F | 33 | Larry Bird | 6 ft 9 in (2.06 m) | 220 lb (100 kg) | | Indiana State |
| G | 35 | Charles Bradley | 6 ft 5 in (1.96 m) | 215 lb (98 kg) | | Wyoming |
| G | 28 | Quinn Buckner | 6 ft 3 in (1.91 m) | 190 lb (86 kg) | | Indiana |
| F | 30 | M. L. Carr | 6 ft 6 in (1.98 m) | 205 lb (93 kg) | | Guilford |
| G | 43 | Gerald Henderson | 6 ft 2 in (1.88 m) | 175 lb (79 kg) | | VCU |
| F | 31 | Cedric Maxwell | 6 ft 8 in (2.03 m) | 205 lb (93 kg) | | Charlotte |
| F | 32 | Kevin McHale | 6 ft 10 in (2.08 m) | 210 lb (95 kg) | | Minnesota |
| C | 00 | Robert Parish | 7 ft 0 in (2.13 m) | 230 lb (104 kg) | | Centenary |
| C | 53 | Rick Robey | 6 ft 11 in (2.11 m) | 230 lb (104 kg) | | Kentucky |
| F | 20 | Scott Wedman | 6 ft 7 in (2.01 m) | 215 lb (98 kg) | | Colorado |

Coaches
Head coach
- Bill Fitch
Assistant(s)
- K. C. Jones
- Jimmy Rodgers

Legend
- (DP) Unsigned draft pick
- (FA) Free agent
- (S) Suspended
- Injured

== Regular season ==
=== Season standings ===
| Atlantic Division | W | L | PCT | GB | Home | Road | Div |
|---|---|---|---|---|---|---|---|
| y-Philadelphia 76ers | 65 | 17 | .793 | – | 35–6 | 30–11 | 15–9 |
| x-Boston Celtics | 56 | 26 | .683 | 9 | 33–8 | 23–18 | 14–10 |
| x-New Jersey Nets | 49 | 33 | .598 | 16 | 30–11 | 19–22 | 11–13 |
| x-New York Knicks | 44 | 38 | .537 | 21 | 26–15 | 18–23 | 10–14 |
| Washington Bullets | 42 | 40 | .512 | 23 | 27–14 | 15–26 | 10–14 |

| # | Eastern Conference | | | | |
| # | Team | W | L | PCT | GB |
|---|---|---|---|---|---|
| 1 | z-Philadelphia 76ers | 65 | 17 | .793 | – |
| 2 | y-Milwaukee Bucks | 51 | 31 | .622 | 14 |
| 3 | x-Boston Celtics | 56 | 26 | .683 | 9 |
| 4 | x-New Jersey Nets | 49 | 33 | .598 | 16 |
| 5 | x-New York Knicks | 44 | 38 | .537 | 21 |
| 6 | x-Atlanta Hawks | 43 | 39 | .524 | 22 |
| 7 | Washington Bullets | 42 | 40 | .512 | 23 |
| 8 | Detroit Pistons | 37 | 45 | .451 | 28 |
| 9 | Chicago Bulls | 28 | 54 | .341 | 37 |
| 10 | Cleveland Cavaliers | 23 | 59 | .280 | 42 |
| 11 | Indiana Pacers | 20 | 62 | .244 | 45 |

z – clinched division title
y – clinched division title
x – clinched playoff spot

== Game log ==
=== Regular season ===
1982–83 game log
Total: 56–26 (home: 33–8; road: 23–18)
October: 2–0 (home: 0–0; road: 2–0)

| Game | Date | Team | Score | High points | High rebounds | High assists | Location Attendance | Record |

November: 11–3 (home: 8–2; road: 3–1)

| Game | Date | Team | Score | High points | High rebounds | High assists | Location Attendance | Record |

December: 9–5 (home: 5–1; road: 4–4)

| Game | Date | Team | Score | High points | High rebounds | High assists | Location Attendance | Record |

January: 13–2 (home: 7–0; road: 6–2)

| Game | Date | Team | Score | High points | High rebounds | High assists | Location Attendance | Record |

February: 6–5 (home: 2–1; road: 4–4)

| Game | Date | Team | Score | High points | High rebounds | High assists | Location Attendance | Record |

March: 8–8 (home: 7–2; road: 1–6)

| Game | Date | Team | Score | High points | High rebounds | High assists | Location Attendance | Record |

April: 7–3 (home: 4–2; road: 3–1)

| Game | Date | Team | Score | High points | High rebounds | High assists | Location Attendance | Record |

1982–83 schedule

=== Playoffs ===
1983 playoff game log
First Round: 2–1 (home: 2–0; road: 0–1)

| Game | Date | Team | Score | High points | High rebounds | High assists | Location Attendance | Series |
|---|---|---|---|---|---|---|---|---|
| 1 | April 19 | Atlanta | W 103–95 | Larry Bird (26) | Robert Parish (16) | Tiny Archibald (11) | Boston Garden; 15,320 | 1–0 |
| 2 | April 22 | @ Atlanta | L 93–95 | Robert Parish (17) | Larry Bird (16) | Larry Bird (9) | Omni Coliseum; 10,405 | 1–1 |
| 3 | April 24 | Atlanta | W 98–79 | Larry Bird (26) | Robert Parish (11) | Larry Bird (9) | Boston Garden; 15,320 | 2–1 |

Conference semifinals: 0–4 (home: 0–2; road: 0–2)

| Game | Date | Team | Score | High points | High rebounds | High assists | Location Attendance | Series |
|---|---|---|---|---|---|---|---|---|
| 1 | April 27 | Milwaukee | L 95–116 | Tiny Archibald (23) | Parish, Maxwell (12) | Tiny Archibald (7) | Boston Garden; 15,320 | 0–1 |
| 2 | April 29 | Milwaukee | L 91–95 | Danny Ainge (25) | Robert Parish (10) | Gerald Henderson (8) | Boston Garden; 15,320 | 0–2 |
| 3 | May 1 | @ Milwaukee | L 99–107 | Larry Bird (21) | Larry Bird (14) | Maxwell, Bird (6) | MECCA Arena; 11,052 | 0–3 |
| 4 | May 2 | @ Milwaukee | L 93–107 | Larry Bird (18) | Larry Bird (11) | Larry Bird (8) | MECCA Arena; 11,052 | 0–4 |

1983 schedule

== See also ==
- 1982–83 NBA season
