= 1982–83 Cleveland Cavaliers season =

NBA professional basketball team season

- Head coach: Tom Nissalke
- General manager: Harry Weltman
- Owner: Ted Stepien
- Arena: Coliseum at Richfield

Results
- Record: 23–59 (.280)
- Place: Division: 5th (Central); Conference: 10th (Eastern)
- Playoff finish: Did not qualify
- Stats at Basketball Reference

Local media
- Television: WUAB
- Radio: WBBG

The 1982–83 Cleveland Cavaliers season was the 13th season for the team in the National Basketball Association (NBA) and in Cleveland, Ohio. It involved the team going 23–59 in Ted Stepien's final season as the team's owner.

== Draft picks ==
Round	Pick	Player	Nationality	School/Club team
1	12	John Bagley	PG	Boston College
2	28	Dave Magley	PF	Kansas

== Roster ==
1982–83 Cleveland Cavaliers roster
Players

Pos.	No.	Player	Height	Weight	DOB	From
PG	5	John Bagley	6 ft 0 in (1.83 m)	185 lb (84 kg)	1960-04-23	Boston College
PF	44	Jeff Cook	6 ft 10 in (2.08 m)	215 lb (98 kg)	1956-10-21	Idaho State
PF	23	Bruce Flowers	6 ft 8 in (2.03 m)	225 lb (102 kg)	1957-06-13	Notre Dame
SG	21	World B. Free	6 ft 2 in (1.88 m)	185 lb (84 kg)	1953-12-09	Guilford
C	41	Steve Hayes	7 ft 0 in (2.13 m)	205 lb (93 kg)	1955-08-02	Idaho State
SF	35	Phil Hubbard	6 ft 8 in (2.03 m)	215 lb (98 kg)	1956-12-13	Michigan
PG	20	Geoff Huston	6 ft 2 in (1.88 m)	175 lb (79 kg)	1957-11-08	Texas Tech
PF	9	Larry Kenon	6 ft 9 in (2.06 m)	205 lb (93 kg)	1952-12-13	Memphis
C	52	Sam Lacey	6 ft 10 in (2.08 m)	235 lb (107 kg)	1948-03-28	New Mexico State
SG	24	Carl Nicks	6 ft 1 in (1.85 m)	175 lb (79 kg)	1958-10-06	Indiana State
PF	11	Cliff Robinson	6 ft 9 in (2.06 m)	220 lb (100 kg)	1960-03-13	USC
C	25	Darren Tillis	6 ft 11 in (2.11 m)	215 lb (98 kg)	1960-02-23	Cleveland State
SF	33	Bob Wilkerson	6 ft 6 in (1.98 m)	195 lb (88 kg)	1954-08-15	Indiana

Coaches
Head coach
- Tom Nissalke
Assistant(s)
- Don Delaney
- Gene Littles

Legend
- (DP) Unsigned draft pick
- (FA) Free agent
- (S) Suspended
- Injured

Roster
Updated: March 30, 1983

== Regular season ==
=== Season standings ===
Central Division	W	L	PCT	GB	Home	Road	Div
y-Milwaukee Bucks	51	31	.622	–	31–10	20–21	22–7
x-Atlanta Hawks	43	39	.524	8	26–15	17–24	21–8
Detroit Pistons	37	45	.451	14	23–18	14–27	19–11
Chicago Bulls	28	54	.341	23	18–23	10–31	13–17
Cleveland Cavaliers	23	59	.280	28	15–26	8–33	8–22
Indiana Pacers	20	62	.244	31	14–27	6–35	6–24

#	Eastern Conference				
#	Team	W	L	PCT	GB
1	z-Philadelphia 76ers	65	17	.793	–
2	y-Milwaukee Bucks	51	31	.622	14
3	x-Boston Celtics	56	26	.683	9
4	x-New Jersey Nets	49	33	.598	16
5	x-New York Knicks	44	38	.537	21
6	x-Atlanta Hawks	43	39	.524	22
7	Washington Bullets	42	40	.512	23
8	Detroit Pistons	37	45	.451	28
9	Chicago Bulls	28	54	.341	37
10	Cleveland Cavaliers	23	59	.280	42
11	Indiana Pacers	20	62	.244	45

z - clinched division title
y - clinched division title
x - clinched playoff spot

=== Game log ===
1982–83 game log
Total: 23–59 (Home: 15–26; Road: 8–33)
October: 0–2 (home: 0–2; road: 0–0)

Game	Date	Team	Score	High points	High rebounds	High assists	Location Attendance	Record

November: 2–11 (home: 1–4; road: 1–7)

Game	Date	Team	Score	High points	High rebounds	High assists	Location Attendance	Record

December: 2–12 (home: 2–5; road: 0–7)

Game	Date	Team	Score	High points	High rebounds	High assists	Location Attendance	Record
19	December 7, 1982	Atlanta	L 90–102				Coliseum at Richfield; 2,254	3–16
23	December 16, 1982	@ Atlanta	L 97–106				The Omni; 4,564	3–20

January: 5–10 (home: 3–5; road: 2–5)

Game	Date	Team	Score	High points	High rebounds	High assists	Location Attendance	Record

February: 6–6 (home: 5–3; road: 1–3)

Game	Date	Team	Score	High points	High rebounds	High assists	Location Attendance	Record
45	February 1, 1983	@ Atlanta	L 84–93				The Omni; 4,802	9–36
47	February 4, 1983	Atlanta	L 81–92				Coliseum at Richfield; 2,066	9–38

March: 4–12 (home: 2–3; road: 2–9)

Game	Date	Team	Score	High points	High rebounds	High assists	Location Attendance	Record
66	March 18, 1983	Atlanta	L 73–97				Coliseum at Richfield; 2,461	17–49
72	March 29, 1983	@ Atlanta	L 82–95				The Omni; 5,064	18–54

April: 4–5 (home: 2–3; road: 2–2)

Game	Date	Team	Score	High points	High rebounds	High assists	Location Attendance	Record

1982–83 schedule

== Player statistics ==
Legend
GP	Games played	GS	Games started	MPG	Minutes per game
FG%	Field-goal percentage	3P%	3-point field-goal percentage	FT%	Free-throw percentage
RPG	Rebounds per game	APG	Assists per game	SPG	Steals per game
BPG	Blocks per game	PPG	Points per game

Player	GP	GS	MPG	FG%	3FG%	FT%	RPG	APG	SPG	BPG	PPG
World B. Free	54	51	35.9	45.8	35.7	74.7	2.9	3.7	1.5	0.2	24.2
Scott Wedman	35	35	36.9	48.0	40.9	84.4	5.9	2.5	0.7	0.3	18.1
Cliff Robinson	77	75	33.8	47.7	0.0	70.8	11.1	1.9	0.8	0.8	18.0
James Edwards	15	8	25.5	48.7	0.0	62.3	6.4	0.9	0.5	0.9	12.3
Geoff Huston	80	79	34.0	48.2	33.3	68.6	2.0	6.1	0.9	0.1	12.2
Ron Brewer	21	18	26.8	40.0	0.0	86.3	1.8	1.3	1.0	0.3	11.4
Phil Hubbard	82	38	23.8	48.2	0.0	68.9	5.7	1.1	1.1	0.1	9.5
Larry Kenon	32	7	19.5	47.2	0.0	76.1	3.7	1.1	0.7	0.3	7.3
Jeff Cook	30	20	26.1	53.7	0.0	76.0	6.9	1.5	0.9	0.6	7.1
Carl Nicks	9	2	16.4	44.1	0.0	64.7	2.9	1.2	0.7	0.0	7.0
Bob Wilkerson	77	11	22.1	41.7	0.0	75.0	3.1	2.5	0.9	0.2	6.7
John Bagley	68	3	14.6	43.2	0.0	76.2	1.4	2.5	0.8	0.1	5.7
Paul Mokeski	23	18	23.4	45.5	0.0	61.5	6.0	1.1	0.5	1.0	5.5
Bruce Flowers	53	5	13.2	53.4	0.0	77.4	3.4	0.9	0.4	0.2	4.9
Sam Lacey	60	33	20.5	42.0	22.2	78.4	3.9	2.0	0.5	0.4	4.2
Darren Tillis	37	4	13.0	43.7	0.0	63.6	3.3	0.4	0.2	0.8	4.1
Steve Hayes	65	3	16.3	47.9	0.0	56.9	3.6	0.6	0.3	0.6	3.6
Dave Magley	14	0	4.0	25.0	0.0	50.0	0.7	0.1	0.1	0.0	0.9

Player statistics citation:

== Transactions ==
October 7, 1982 - Traded a 1986 2nd round draft pick to the Detroit Pistons for Steve Hayes.

October 11, 1982 - Waived Mike Evans.

October 22, 1982 - Waived Michael Wilson.

October 25, 1982 - Traded Brad Branson to the Indiana Pacers for a 1983 2nd round draft pick.

October 28, 1982 - Waived Lowes Moore.

December 6, 1982 - Signed Sam Lacey as a free agent.

December 15, 1982 - Traded Ron Brewer to the Golden State Warriors for World B. Free.

December 20, 1982 - Waived Paul Mokeski.

January 7, 1983 - Waived Dave Magley.

January 10, 1983 - Acquired player rights to Larry Kenon from the Golden State Warriors.

January 14, 1983 - Traded Scott Wedman to the Boston Celtics for Darren Tillis and a 1983 1st round draft pick.

February 7, 1983 - Traded James Edwards and a 1983 1st round draft pick to the Phoenix Suns for Jeff Cook, a 1983 1st round draft pick, and a 1983 3rd round draft pick.

March 21, 1983 - Waived Larry Kenon.

March 30, 1983 - Signed Carl Nicks as a free agent.

June 27, 1983 - Traded a 1983 2nd round draft pick to the Seattle SuperSonics for Lonnie Shelton.
