= 1982–83 Chicago Bulls season =

NBA professional basketball team season

- Head coach: Paul Westhead
- General manager: Rod Thorn
- Owner(s): Arthur Wirtz and Jonathan Kovler
- Arena: Chicago Stadium

Results
- Record: 28–54 (.341)
- Place: Division: 4th (Central); Conference: 9th (Eastern)
- Playoff finish: Did not qualify
- Stats at Basketball Reference

Local media
- Television: WGN-TV (Milo Hamilton, Johnny “Red” Kerr); Sportsvision (Joe Tait, John Mengelt)
- Radio: WIND (Jim Durham, Dave Baum)

The 1982–83 Chicago Bulls season was the Bulls' 17th season in the NBA.

== Draft picks ==
Round	Pick	Player	Position	Nationality	College
1	7	Quintin Dailey	SG	United States	San Francisco
2	26	Ricky Frazier	SF	United States	Missouri
2	30	Wallace Bryant	C	United States	San Francisco
2	31	Rod Higgins	PF/C	United States	Fresno State
3	53	Tyrone Adams		United States	Kansas State
4	76	Chuck Aleksinas	C	United States	Connecticut
5	99	Rubin Jackson		United States	Oklahoma City
6	122	B. B. Fontenet		United States	Nevada
7	145	Chuck Verderber		United States	Kentucky
8	168	Mike Burns		United States	UNLV
9	191	Skip Dillard		United States	DePaul
10	212	Tony Britto		United States	Campbell

== Roster ==
1982–83 Chicago Bulls roster
Players

Pos.	No.	Player	Height	Weight	DOB	From
G	7	Dudley Bradley	6 ft 6 in (1.98 m)	195 lb (88 kg)	1957-03-19	North Carolina
G	23	Mike Bratz	6 ft 2 in (1.88 m)	185 lb (84 kg)	1955-10-17	Stanford
C	40	Dave Corzine	6 ft 11 in (2.11 m)	250 lb (113 kg)	1956-04-25	DePaul
G	44	Quintin Dailey	6 ft 3 in (1.91 m)	180 lb (82 kg)	1961-01-22	San Francisco
F	34	David Greenwood	6 ft 9 in (2.06 m)	222 lb (101 kg)	1957-05-27	UCLA
F	22	Rod Higgins	6 ft 7 in (2.01 m)	200 lb (91 kg)	1960-01-31	Fresno State
G	11	Tracy Jackson	6 ft 6 in (1.98 m)	205 lb (93 kg)	1959-04-21	Notre Dame
F	13	Dwight Jones	6 ft 10 in (2.08 m)	210 lb (95 kg)	1952-02-27	Houston
F	35	Larry Kenon	6 ft 9 in (2.06 m)	205 lb (93 kg)	1952-12-13	Memphis
G	12	Ronnie Lester	6 ft 2 in (1.88 m)	175 lb (79 kg)	1959-01-01	Iowa
F	52	Mark Olberding	6 ft 8 in (2.03 m)	225 lb (102 kg)	1956-04-21	Minnesota
C	33	Jawann Oldham	7 ft 0 in (2.13 m)	215 lb (98 kg)	1957-07-04	Seattle
F	35	Larry Spriggs	6 ft 7 in (2.01 m)	230 lb (104 kg)	1959-09-08	Howard
G	24	Reggie Theus	6 ft 7 in (2.01 m)	190 lb (86 kg)	1957-10-13	UNLV
F	0	Orlando Woolridge	6 ft 9 in (2.06 m)	215 lb (98 kg)	1959-12-16	Notre Dame

Coaches
Head coach
- Paul Westhead
Assistant(s)
- Don Casey
- Mike Thibault

Legend
- (DP) Unsigned draft pick
- (FA) Free agent
- (S) Suspended
- Injured

Roster
Updated: March 22, 1983

== Regular season ==
=== Season standings ===
Central Division	W	L	PCT	GB	Home	Road	Div
y-Milwaukee Bucks	51	31	.622	–	31–10	20–21	22–7
x-Atlanta Hawks	43	39	.524	8	26–15	17–24	21–8
Detroit Pistons	37	45	.451	14	23–18	14–27	19–11
Chicago Bulls	28	54	.341	23	18–23	10–31	13–17
Cleveland Cavaliers	23	59	.280	28	15–26	8–33	8–22
Indiana Pacers	20	62	.244	31	14–27	6–35	6–24

#	Eastern Conference				
#	Team	W	L	PCT	GB
1	z-Philadelphia 76ers	65	17	.793	–
2	y-Milwaukee Bucks	51	31	.622	14
3	x-Boston Celtics	56	26	.683	9
4	x-New Jersey Nets	49	33	.598	16
5	x-New York Knicks	44	38	.537	21
6	x-Atlanta Hawks	43	39	.524	22
7	Washington Bullets	42	40	.512	23
8	Detroit Pistons	37	45	.451	28
9	Chicago Bulls	28	54	.341	37
10	Cleveland Cavaliers	23	59	.280	42
11	Indiana Pacers	20	62	.244	45

z - clinched division title
y - clinched division title
x - clinched playoff spot

== Player statistics ==
Legend
GP	Games played	GS	Games started	MPG	Minutes per game
FG%	Field-goal percentage	3P%	3-point field-goal percentage	FT%	Free-throw percentage
RPG	Rebounds per game	APG	Assists per game	SPG	Steals per game
BPG	Blocks per game	PPG	Points per game

== Awards and records ==
- Quintin Dailey, NBA All-Rookie Team 1st Team
- Reggie Theus, NBA All-Star Game

== See also ==
- 1982-83 NBA season
