= 1982–83 Atlanta Hawks season =

NBA professional basketball team season

- Head coach: Kevin Loughery (3rd season)
- Arena: The Omni

Results
- Record: 43–39 (.524)
- Place: Division: 2nd (Central); Conference: 6th (Eastern)
- Playoff finish: East First Round (Eliminated 1–2)
- Stats at Basketball Reference

Local media
- Television: WTBS; SuperStation WTBS
- Radio: WSB

The 1982–83 Atlanta Hawks season was the franchise's thirty-fourth season in the National Basketball Association and fifteenth in Atlanta, Georgia. Prior to the start of the season, the Hawks made a blockbuster trade. The franchise sent John Drew and Freeman Williams to the Utah Jazz in exchange for first round draft pick Dominique Wilkins, a star at the University of Georgia. Wilkins would make an impact as he averaged 17.5 points per game. The Hawks finished in second place with a 43–39 record. In the playoffs, the Hawks would however be eliminated 2–1 by the Boston Celtics.

== Draft picks ==
Round	Pick	Player	Position	Nationality	College
1	10	Keith Edmonson	SG	United States	Purdue
3	56	Joe Kopicki		United States	Detroit Mercy
5	102	Mark Hall		United States	Minnesota
6	126	Jay Bruchak		United States	Mount St. Mary's
7	148	Horace Wyatt		United States	Clemson
8	172	James Ratiff		United States	Howard
9	194	Pierre Bland		United States	Elizabeth City State
10	216	Ronnie McAdoo		United States	Old Dominion

== Roster ==
Atlanta Hawks roster
Players

Pos.	No.	Player	Height	Weight	DOB	From
C	31	Rickey Brown	6 ft 10 in (2.08 m)	215 lb (98 kg)	1958-08-20	Mississippi State
G	16	Johnny Davis	6 ft 2 in (1.88 m)	170 lb (77 kg)	1955-10-21	Dayton
G	11	Keith Edmonson	6 ft 5 in (1.96 m)	195 lb (88 kg)	1960-09-28	Purdue
G	34	Mike Glenn	6 ft 2 in (1.88 m)	175 lb (79 kg)	1955-09-10	Southern Illinois
F	44	Scott Hastings	6 ft 10 in (2.08 m)	235 lb (107 kg)	1960-06-03	Arkansas
G	3	Eddie Johnson	6 ft 2 in (1.88 m)	180 lb (82 kg)	1955-02-24	Auburn
C	52	George Johnson	6 ft 11 in (2.11 m)	205 lb (93 kg)	1948-12-18	Dillard
F	40	Rudy Macklin	6 ft 7 in (2.01 m)	205 lb (93 kg)	1958-02-19	LSU
G	1	Wes Matthews	6 ft 1 in (1.85 m)	170 lb (77 kg)	1959-08-24	Wisconsin
C	54	Tom McMillen	6 ft 11 in (2.11 m)	215 lb (98 kg)	1952-05-26	Maryland
C	30	Tree Rollins	7 ft 1 in (2.16 m)	235 lb (107 kg)	1955-06-16	Clemson
F	32	Dan Roundfield	6 ft 8 in (2.03 m)	205 lb (93 kg)	1953-05-26	Central Michigan
G	7	Randy Smith	6 ft 3 in (1.91 m)	180 lb (82 kg)	1948-12-12	Buffalo State
F	21	Dominique Wilkins	6 ft 7 in (2.01 m)	200 lb (91 kg)	1960-01-12	Georgia

Coaches
Head coach
- Kevin Loughery

Legend
- (DP) Unsigned draft pick
- (FA) Free agent
- (S) Suspended
- Injured

Roster

== Regular season ==
=== Season standings ===
Central Division	W	L	PCT	GB	Home	Road	Div
y-Milwaukee Bucks	51	31	.622	–	31–10	20–21	22–7
x-Atlanta Hawks	43	39	.524	8	26–15	17–24	21–8
Detroit Pistons	37	45	.451	14	23–18	14–27	19–11
Chicago Bulls	28	54	.341	23	18–23	10–31	13–17
Cleveland Cavaliers	23	59	.280	28	15–26	8–33	8–22
Indiana Pacers	20	62	.244	31	14–27	6–35	6–24

#	Eastern Conference				
#	Team	W	L	PCT	GB
1	z-Philadelphia 76ers	65	17	.793	–
2	y-Milwaukee Bucks	51	31	.622	14
3	x-Boston Celtics	56	26	.683	9
4	x-New Jersey Nets	49	33	.598	16
5	x-New York Knicks	44	38	.537	21
6	x-Atlanta Hawks	43	39	.524	22
7	Washington Bullets	42	40	.512	23
8	Detroit Pistons	37	45	.451	28
9	Chicago Bulls	28	54	.341	37
10	Cleveland Cavaliers	23	59	.280	42
11	Indiana Pacers	20	62	.244	45

z - clinched division title
y - clinched division title
x - clinched playoff spot

=== Game log ===
1982–83 game log
November

Game	Date	Team	Score	High points	High rebounds	High assists	Location Attendance	Record

December

Game	Date	Team	Score	High points	High rebounds	High assists	Location Attendance	Record

January

Game	Date	Team	Score	High points	High rebounds	High assists	Location Attendance	Record

February

Game	Date	Team	Score	High points	High rebounds	High assists	Location Attendance	Record

March

Game	Date	Team	Score	High points	High rebounds	High assists	Location Attendance	Record

April

Game	Date	Team	Score	High points	High rebounds	High assists	Location Attendance	Record

1982–83 schedule

== Playoffs ==
1983 playoff game log
First round: 1–2 (home: 1–0; road: 0–2)

Game	Date	Team	Score	High points	High rebounds	High assists	Location Attendance	Series
1	April 19	@ Boston	L 95–103	Dan Roundfield (24)	Dan Roundfield (20)	Johnny Davis (11)	Boston Garden; 15,320	0–1
2	April 22	Boston	W 95–93	Dan Roundfield (19)	Tree Rollins (14)	Johnny Davis (14)	Omni Coliseum; 10,405	1–1
3	April 24	@ Boston	L 79–98	Tree Rollins (18)	Dan Roundfield (10)	three players tied (3)	Boston Garden; 15,320	1–2

1983 schedule

== Player statistics ==
Legend
GP	Games played	GS	Games started	MPG	Minutes per game
FG%	Field-goal percentage	3P%	3-point field-goal percentage	FT%	Free-throw percentage
RPG	Rebounds per game	APG	Assists per game	SPG	Steals per game
BPG	Blocks per game	PPG	Points per game

=== Season ===
Player	GP	GS	MPG	FG%	3FG%	FT%	RPG	APG	SPG	BPG	PPG
Dan Roundfield	77	76	36.5	47.0	18.5	74.9	11.4	2.9	0.8	1.5	19.0
Dominique Wilkins	82	82	32.9	49.3	18.2	68.2	5.8	1.6	1.0	0.8	17.5
Eddie Johnson	61	57	29.7	45.3	34.1	78.5	2.0	5.2	1.0	0.1	16.0
Johnny Davis	53	33	27.6	45.5	27.8	79.6	2.4	5.9	0.8	0.1	12.9
Rory Sparrow	49	49	31.6	51.6	20.0	74.3	2.9	4.9	1.4	0.0	12.6
Tom McMillen	61	4	22.4	46.7	0.0	81.2	3.6	1.2	0.3	0.4	8.3
Tree Rollins	80	80	30.9	51.0	0.0	72.6	9.3	0.9	0.6	4.3	7.8
Mike Glenn	73	4	15.4	51.8	0.0	83.1	1.2	1.7	0.4	0.1	7.3
Wes Matthews	64	0	18.5	40.3	29.2	76.8	1.4	3.9	0.9	0.1	6.9
Rudy Macklin	73	20	16.0	47.2	0.0	77.1	2.6	1.0	0.6	0.1	6.0
Steve Hawes	46	3	18.7	37.3	14.3	74.2	5.0	1.3	0.6	0.2	5.0
Rickey Brown	26	0	11.7	47.1	0.0	62.5	3.4	0.3	0.2	0.2	4.7
Randy Smith	15	0	9.5	43.9	0.0	92.9	0.5	0.9	0.1	0.0	4.7
Keith Edmonson	32	2	9.7	34.5	0.0	59.3	1.2	0.7	0.3	0.2	3.5
Sam Pellom	2	0	4.5	33.3	0.0	0.0	0.0	0.5	0.0	0.0	2.0
George Johnson	37	0	12.5	43.9	0.0	73.7	3.2	0.5	0.3	1.6	1.7
Scott Hastings	10	0	4.2	31.3	0.0	66.7	1.0	0.2	0.1	0.1	1.4

=== Playoffs ===
Player	GP	GS	MPG	FG%	3FG%	FT%	RPG	APG	SPG	BPG	PPG
Dan Roundfield	3		41.3	48.0	0.0	45.5	14.0	3.3	1.3	1.3	17.7
Johnny Davis	3		37.7	40.4	0.0	90.0	1.7	9.0	0.0	0.0	17.0
Dominique Wilkins	3		36.3	40.5	100.0	85.7	5.0	0.3	0.7	0.3	15.7
Rudy Macklin	3		26.0	45.8	0.0	80.0	5.0	0.7	0.7	0.7	10.0
Tree Rollins	3		39.3	48.1	0.0	33.3	10.0	1.0	0.3	3.3	9.7
Mike Glenn	3		22.3	54.5	0.0	100.0	1.7	1.0	0.7	0.0	9.3
Tom McMillen	3		13.0	33.3	0.0	100.0	2.3	0.7	0.3	0.7	3.3
Wes Matthews	3		12.7	33.3	0.0	80.0	0.0	3.7	0.0	0.3	3.3
Randy Smith	2		7.5	20.0	0.0	100.0	0.5	2.0	0.5	0.0	3.0
Keith Edmonson	1		2.0	100.0	0.0	0.0	1.0	1.0	0.0	0.0	2.0
Rickey Brown	2		7.5	33.3	0.0	50.0	1.5	0.0	0.0	0.0	1.5
George Johnson	1		2.0	0.0	0.0	0.0	0.0	0.0	0.0	0.0	0.0

Player statistics citation:

== Awards and records ==
=== Awards ===
- Dan Roundfield, NBA All-Defensive First Team
- Wayne Rollins, NBA All-Defensive Second Team
- Dominique Wilkins, NBA All-Rookie Team 1st Team

== Transactions ==
=== Free agents ===
==== Additions ====
Player	Signed	Former team

==== Subtractions ====
Player	Left	New team

== See also ==
- 1982-83 NBA season
