= 1982–83 NBA season =

37th NBA season

- League: National Basketball Association
- Sport: Basketball
- Duration: October 29, 1982 – April 17, 1983; April 19 – May 20, 1983 (Playoffs); May 22–31, 1983 (Finals)
- Teams: 23
- TV partner(s): CBS, ESPN, USA

Draft
- Top draft pick: James Worthy
- Picked by: Los Angeles Lakers

Regular season
- Top seed: Philadelphia 76ers
- Season MVP: Moses Malone (Philadelphia)
- Top scorer: Alex English (Denver)

Playoffs
- Eastern champions: Philadelphia 76ers
- Eastern runners-up: Milwaukee Bucks
- Western champions: Los Angeles Lakers
- Western runners-up: San Antonio Spurs

Finals
- Champions: Philadelphia 76ers
- Runners-up: Los Angeles Lakers
- Finals MVP: Moses Malone (Philadelphia)

NBA seasons
- ← 1981–82 1983–84 →

The 1982–83 NBA season was the 37th season of the National Basketball Association. The season ended with the Philadelphia 76ers winning the NBA championship, sweeping the Los Angeles Lakers 4 games to 0 in the NBA Finals.

== Notable occurrences ==
- The 1983 NBA All-Star Game was played at The Forum in Inglewood, California, with the East defeating the West 132–123. Julius Erving of the Philadelphia 76ers won the game's MVP award. It was at this game that R&B singer Marvin Gaye performed his famous rendition of the "Star-Spangled Banner".
- This season marked the final season for Larry O'Brien as commissioner of the NBA. In honor of his long tenure, the NBA would rename its championship trophy after him (it was originally named after the late Boston Celtics owner Walter A. Brown).
- The USA Network extended their cable deal with the NBA for another two years, and ESPN shared broadcast rights with them.
- The 76ers posted a 12–1 record in the playoffs, a record for highest winning percentage in the postseason (it was later broken by the 2001 Los Angeles Lakers, whose record was, in turn, later broken by the 2017 Golden State Warriors).
- The Boston Celtics were swept for the first time in their playoff history, at the hands of the Milwaukee Bucks in the Conference Semifinals of the 1983 NBA playoffs. The Bucks swept the Celtics 4–0.
- The 1983 NBA Finals was the last Finals to end before June 1.
- This was the final season for Wilson serving as the suppliers of the official NBA game ball (a partnership that dated back to 1946); it was replaced in that capacity by Spalding in the following season, which supplied game balls to the NBA through the 2020–21 season. Wilson returned as the game ball supplier for the 2021–22 season.
- Ted Stepien sold the Cleveland Cavaliers to Gordon Gund. Under Stepien, attendance at the Cavaliers' home arena at Richfield Coliseum declined, first-round picks were traded in consecutive years (which led the NBA to institute the Ted Stepien rule), and long-time announcer Joe Tait was fired (he returned following the Gund purchase). The Cavaliers had five different coaches and three consecutive losing seasons under Stepien.
- On November 3, 1982, Randy Smith played in his 845th consecutive NBA game, breaking Johnny Kerr's iron man record. The game was a 130–111 loss to the Philadelphia 76ers in which Smith started and scored 14 points. Smith's iron man streak ended at 906 games when he played his last game with the Clippers on March 13, 1983, and was traded to the Atlanta Hawks. The record was later surpassed by A.C. Green in 1997.
- On April 16, 1983, during a 12-point victory over the Dallas Mavericks, the San Antonio Spurs set the all-time NBA regular season record for team field goal percentage by shooting .707 from the floor.
- The NBA adds the NBA Defensive Player of the Year and the NBA Sixth Man of the Year Award awards.
- This season saw the final season of eventual Hall of Famers' Dave Cowens, Spencer Haywood and Calvin Murphy.

Coaching changes
Off-season
Team	1981–82 coach	1982–83 coach
Chicago Bulls	Rod Thorn	Paul Westhead
Cleveland Cavaliers	Bill Musselman	Tom Nissalke
New York Knicks	Red Holzman	Hubie Brown
In-season
Team	Outgoing coach	Incoming coach
New Jersey Nets	Larry Brown	Bill Blair

== Final standings ==
=== By division ===
Atlantic Division	W	L	PCT	GB	Home	Road	Div
y-Philadelphia 76ers	65	17	.793	–	35–6	30–11	15–9
x-Boston Celtics	56	26	.683	9	33–8	23–18	14–10
x-New Jersey Nets	49	33	.598	16	30–11	19–22	11–13
x-New York Knicks	44	38	.537	21	26–15	18–23	10–14
Washington Bullets	42	40	.512	23	27–14	15–26	10–14

Central Division	W	L	PCT	GB	Home	Road	Div
y-Milwaukee Bucks	51	31	.622	–	31–10	20–21	22–7
x-Atlanta Hawks	43	39	.524	8	26–15	17–24	21–8
Detroit Pistons	37	45	.451	14	23–18	14–27	19–11
Chicago Bulls	28	54	.341	23	18–23	10–31	13–17
Cleveland Cavaliers	23	59	.280	28	15–26	8–33	8–22
Indiana Pacers	20	62	.244	31	14–27	6–35	6–24

Midwest Division	W	L	PCT	GB	Home	Road	Div
y-San Antonio Spurs	53	29	.646	–	31–10	22–19	21–9
x-Denver Nuggets	45	37	.549	8	29–12	16–25	17–13
Kansas City Kings	45	37	.549	8	30–11	15–26	18–12
Dallas Mavericks	38	44	.463	15	23–18	15–26	15–15
Utah Jazz	30	52	.366	23	21–20	9–32	15–15
Houston Rockets	14	68	.171	39	9–32	5–36	4–26

Pacific Division	W	L	PCT	GB	Home	Road	Div
y-Los Angeles Lakers	58	24	.707	–	33–8	25–16	21–9
x-Phoenix Suns	53	29	.646	5	32–9	21–20	21–9
x-Seattle SuperSonics	48	34	.585	10	29–12	19–22	14–16
x-Portland Trail Blazers	46	36	.561	12	31–10	15–26	16–14
Golden State Warriors	30	52	.366	28	21–20	9–32	11–19
San Diego Clippers	25	57	.305	33	18–23	7–34	7–23

=== By conference ===
#	Eastern Conference				
#	Team	W	L	PCT	GB
1	z-Philadelphia 76ers	65	17	.793	–
2	y-Milwaukee Bucks	51	31	.622	14
3	x-Boston Celtics	56	26	.683	9
4	x-New Jersey Nets	49	33	.598	16
5	x-New York Knicks	44	38	.537	21
6	x-Atlanta Hawks	43	39	.524	22
7	Washington Bullets	42	40	.512	23
8	Detroit Pistons	37	45	.451	28
9	Chicago Bulls	28	54	.341	37
10	Cleveland Cavaliers	23	59	.280	42
11	Indiana Pacers	20	62	.244	45

#	Western Conference				
#	Team	W	L	PCT	GB
1	c-Los Angeles Lakers	58	24	.707	–
2	y-San Antonio Spurs	53	29	.646	5
3	x-Phoenix Suns	53	29	.646	5
4	x-Seattle SuperSonics	48	34	.585	10
5	x-Portland Trail Blazers	46	36	.561	12
6	x-Denver Nuggets	45	37	.549	13
7	Kansas City Kings	45	37	.549	13
8	Dallas Mavericks	38	44	.463	20
9	Utah Jazz	30	52	.366	28
9	Golden State Warriors	30	52	.366	28
11	San Diego Clippers	25	57	.305	33
12	Houston Rockets	14	68	.171	44

Notes

- z – Clinched home court advantage for the entire playoffs and first round bye
- c – Clinched home court advantage for the conference playoffs and first round bye
- y – Clinched division title and first round bye
- x – Clinched playoff spot

== Playoffs ==
Teams in bold advanced to the next round. The numbers to the left of each team indicate the team's seeding in its conference, and the numbers to the right indicate the number of games the team won in that round. The division champions are marked by an asterisk. Home court advantage does not necessarily belong to the higher-seeded team, but instead the team with the better regular season record; teams enjoying the home advantage are shown in italics.

First Round
E4	New Jersey	0
**E5**	**New York**	**2**
**E3**	**Boston**	**2**
E6	Atlanta	1
W4	Seattle	0
**W5**	**Portland**	**2**
W3	Phoenix	1
**W6**	**Denver**	**2**

Conference Semifinals
**E1**	**Philadelphia***	**4**
E5	New York	0
**Eastern Conference**
E3	Boston	0
**E2**	**Milwaukee***	**4**
**W1**	**Los Angeles***	**4**
W5	Portland	1
**Western Conference**
W6	Denver	1
**W2**	**San Antonio***	**4**

Conference Finals
**E1**	**Philadelphia***	**4**
E2	Milwaukee*	1
**W1**	**Los Angeles***	**4**
W2	San Antonio*	2

NBA Finals
**E1**	**Philadelphia***	**4**
W1	Los Angeles*	0

- * Division winner
- **Bold** Series winner
- Italic Team with home-court advantage

== Statistics leaders ==
Category	Player	Team	Stat
Points per game	Alex English	Denver Nuggets	28.4
Total Points	Alex English	Denver Nuggets	2,326
Rebounds per game	Moses Malone	Philadelphia 76ers	15.3
Total Rebounds	Moses Malone	Philadelphia 76ers	1,194
Assists per game	Magic Johnson	Los Angeles Lakers	10.5
Total Assists	Magic Johnson	Los Angeles Lakers	829
Steals per game	Micheal Ray Richardson	Golden State Warriors	2.84
Total Steals	Rickey Green	Utah Jazz	220
Blocks per game	Tree Rollins	Atlanta Hawks	4.29
Total Blocks	Tree Rollins	Atlanta Hawks	343
FG%	Artis Gilmore	San Antonio Spurs	.626
FT%	Calvin Murphy	Houston Rockets	.920
3FG%	Mike Dunleavy	San Antonio Spurs	.345

== NBA awards ==
- Most Valuable Player: Moses Malone, Philadelphia 76ers
- Rookie of the Year: Terry Cummings, San Diego Clippers
- Defensive Player of the Year: Sidney Moncrief, Milwaukee Bucks
- Sixth Man of the Year: Bobby Jones, Philadelphia 76ers
- Coach of the Year: Don Nelson, Milwaukee Bucks

- All-NBA First Team:
  - F – Larry Bird, Boston Celtics
  - F – Julius Erving, Philadelphia 76ers
  - C – Moses Malone, Philadelphia 76ers
  - G – Sidney Moncrief, Milwaukee Bucks
  - G – Magic Johnson, Los Angeles Lakers
- All-NBA Second Team:
  - F – Alex English, Denver Nuggets
  - F – Buck Williams, New Jersey Nets
  - C – Kareem Abdul-Jabbar, Los Angeles Lakers
  - G – George Gervin, San Antonio Spurs
  - G – Isiah Thomas, Detroit Pistons

- All-NBA Rookie Team:
  - James Worthy, Los Angeles Lakers
  - Quintin Dailey, Chicago Bulls
  - Terry Cummings, San Diego Clippers
  - Clark Kellogg, Indiana Pacers
  - Dominique Wilkins, Atlanta Hawks

- NBA All-Defensive First Team:
  - Bobby Jones, Philadelphia 76ers
  - Dan Roundfield, Atlanta Hawks
  - Moses Malone, Philadelphia 76ers
  - Sidney Moncrief, Milwaukee Bucks
  - Dennis Johnson, Phoenix Suns (tie)
  - Maurice Cheeks, Philadelphia 76ers (tie)
- NBA All-Defensive Second Team:
  - Larry Bird, Boston Celtics
  - Kevin McHale, Boston Celtics
  - Wayne Rollins, Atlanta Hawks
  - Michael Cooper, Los Angeles Lakers
  - T. R. Dunn, Denver Nuggets

=== Player of the week ===
The following players were named NBA Player of the Week.

Week	Player
Oct. 29 – Nov. 7	Reggie Theus (Chicago Bulls) (1/1)
Nov. 8 – Nov. 14	Kelly Tripucka (Detroit Pistons) (1/1)
Nov. 15 – Nov. 21	Alex English (Denver Nuggets) (1/2)
Nov. 22 – Nov. 28	Larry Bird (Boston Celtics) (1/3)
Nov. 29 – Dec. 5	Buck Williams (New Jersey Nets) (1/1)
Dec. 6 – Dec. 12	Larry Bird (Boston Celtics) (2/3)
Dec. 13 – Dec. 19	Isiah Thomas (Detroit Pistons) (1/1)
Dec. 20 – Dec. 26	Maurice Lucas (Phoenix Suns) (1/1)
Dec. 27 – Jan. 2	Kiki Vandeweghe (Denver Nuggets) (1/1)
Jan. 3 – Jan. 9	Mickey Johnson (New Jersey Nets) (1/1)
Jan. 10 – Jan. 16	Alex English (Denver Nuggets) (2/2)
Jan. 17 – Jan. 23	Joe Barry Carroll (Golden State Warriors) (1/1)
Jan. 24 – Jan. 30	Artis Gilmore (San Antonio Spurs) (1/1)
Jan. 31 – Feb. 6	Moses Malone (Philadelphia 76ers) (1/1)
Feb. 7 – Feb. 21	Larry Nance (Phoenix Suns) (1/1)
Feb. 22 – Feb. 27	Walter Davis (Phoenix Suns) (1/1)
Feb. 28 – Mar. 6	John Drew (Utah Jazz) (1/1)
Mar. 7 – Mar. 13	Magic Johnson (Los Angeles Lakers) (1/2)
Mar. 14 – Mar. 20	Andrew Toney (Philadelphia 76ers) (1/1)
Mar. 21 – Mar. 27	Jeff Ruland (Washington Bullets) (1/1)
Mar. 28 – Apr. 3	Larry Bird (Boston Celtics) (3/3)
Apr. 4 – Apr. 10	Magic Johnson (Los Angeles Lakers) (2/2)
Apr. 11 – Apr. 17	Mike Glenn (Atlanta Hawks) (1/1)

=== Player of the month ===
The following players were named NBA Player of the Month.

Month	Player
October/November	Larry Bird (Boston Celtics) (1/1)
December	Larry Drew (Kansas City Kings)(1/1) Moses Malone (Philadelphia 76ers) (1/2)
January	Alex English (Denver Nuggets) (1/1)
February	Moses Malone (Philadelphia 76ers) (2/2)
March	Jeff Ruland (Washington Bullets) (1/1)

=== Rookie of the month ===
The following players were named NBA Rookie of the Month.

Month	Rookie
October/November	Terry Cummings (San Diego Clippers) (1/4)
December	Clark Kellogg (Indiana Pacers) (1/1)
January	Terry Cummings (San Diego Clippers) (2/4)
February	Terry Cummings (San Diego Clippers) (3/4)
March	Terry Cummings (San Diego Clippers) (4/4)

=== Coach of the month ===
The following coaches were named NBA Coach of the Month.

Month	Coach
October/November	Scotty Robertson (Detroit Pistons) (1/1)
December	Billy Cunningham (Philadelphia 76ers) (1/1)
January	Pat Riley (Los Angeles Lakers) (1/1)
February	Hubie Brown (New York Knicks) (1/1)
March	Stan Albeck (San Antonio Spurs) (1/1)

== See also ==
- List of NBA regular season records
