= 1982–83 Kansas City Kings season =

NBA professional basketball team season

- Head coach: Cotton Fitzsimmons
- Owners: Leon Karosen; Robert Margolin; H. Paul Rosenberg
- Arena: Kemper Arena

Results
- Record: 45–37 (.549)
- Place: Division: 2nd (Midwest); Conference: 7th (Western)
- Playoff finish: Did not qualify
- Stats at Basketball Reference

Local media
- Television: KSHB-TV
- Radio: KMBZ

The 1982–83 Kansas City Kings season was the Kings 34th season in the NBA and their 11th season in the city of Kansas City.

== Draft picks ==
Round	Pick	Player	Position	Nationality	College
1	5	LaSalle Thompson	C	United States	Texas
1	17	Brook Steppe	SG/SF	United States	Georgia Tech
3	51	Jim Johnstone	C/F	United States	Wake Forest
4	74	Mike Sanders	PG	United States	UCLA
5	97	Ken Simpson		United States	Grambling State
6	120	Poncho Wright		United States	Louisville
7	143	Perry Range		United States	Illinois
8	166	Ed Nealy	PF	United States	Kansas State
9	189	Jack Moore	PG	United States	Nebraska
10	210	Robert Estes	SF	United States	Iowa State

== Roster ==
1982–83 Kansas City Kings roster
Players

Pos.	No.	Player	Height	Weight	DOB	From
F	9	Kenny Dennard	6 ft 8 in (2.03 m)	220 lb (100 kg)		Duke
G	22	Larry Drew	6 ft 1 in (1.85 m)	170 lb (77 kg)		Missouri
G/F	8	Eddie Johnson	6 ft 7 in (2.01 m)	215 lb (98 kg)		Illinois
C	33	Steve Johnson	6 ft 10 in (2.08 m)	235 lb (107 kg)		Oregon State
F	51	Reggie King	6 ft 6 in (1.98 m)	225 lb (102 kg)		Alabama
F	30	Kevin Loder	6 ft 6 in (1.98 m)	205 lb (93 kg)		Alabama State
F/C	50	Joe C. Meriweather	6 ft 10 in (2.08 m)	215 lb (98 kg)		Southern Illinois
F	20	Ed Nealy	6 ft 7 in (2.01 m)	238 lb (108 kg)		Kansas State
G	14	Brook Steppe	6 ft 5 in (1.96 m)	195 lb (88 kg)		Georgia Tech
C	41	LaSalle Thompson	6 ft 10 in (2.08 m)	245 lb (111 kg)		Texas
G	25	Ray Williams	6 ft 3 in (1.91 m)	188 lb (85 kg)		Minnesota
G/F	42	Mike Woodson	6 ft 5 in (1.96 m)	195 lb (88 kg)		Indiana

Coaches
Head coach
- Cotton Fitzsimmons
Assistant(s)
- Frank Hamblen

Legend
- (DP) Unsigned draft pick
- (FA) Free agent
- (S) Suspended
- Injured

== Regular season ==
=== Season standings ===
Midwest Division	W	L	PCT	GB	Home	Road	Div
y-San Antonio Spurs	53	29	.646	–	31–10	22–19	21–9
x-Denver Nuggets	45	37	.549	8	29–12	16–25	17–13
Kansas City Kings	45	37	.549	8	30–11	15–26	18–12
Dallas Mavericks	38	44	.463	15	23–18	15–26	15–15
Utah Jazz	30	52	.366	23	21–20	9–32	15–15
Houston Rockets	14	68	.171	39	9–32	5–36	4–26

#	Western Conference				
#	Team	W	L	PCT	GB
1	c-Los Angeles Lakers	58	24	.707	–
2	y-San Antonio Spurs	53	29	.646	5
3	x-Phoenix Suns	53	29	.646	5
4	x-Seattle SuperSonics	48	34	.585	10
5	x-Portland Trail Blazers	46	36	.561	12
6	x-Denver Nuggets	45	37	.549	13
7	Kansas City Kings	45	37	.549	13
8	Dallas Mavericks	38	44	.463	20
9	Utah Jazz	30	52	.366	28
9	Golden State Warriors	30	52	.366	28
11	San Diego Clippers	25	57	.305	33
12	Houston Rockets	14	68	.171	44

z - clinched division title
y - clinched division title
x - clinched playoff spot

== Player statistics ==
Legend
GP	Games played	GS	Games started	MPG	Minutes per game
FG%	Field-goal percentage	3P%	3-point field-goal percentage	FT%	Free-throw percentage
RPG	Rebounds per game	APG	Assists per game	SPG	Steals per game
BPG	Blocks per game	PPG	Points per game

Player	GP	GS	MPG	FG%	3FG%	FT%	RPG	APG	SPG	BPG	PPG

== See also ==
- 1982-83 NBA season
