= 1982–83 Denver Nuggets season =

NBA professional basketball team season

- Head coach: Doug Moe
- Arena: McNichols Sports Arena

Results
- Record: 45–37 (.549)
- Place: Division: 2nd (Midwest); Conference: 6th (Western)
- Playoff finish: West Conference Semi-finals (lost to Spurs 1–4)
- Stats at Basketball Reference

Local media
- Television: KWGN
- Radio: KOA

The 1982–83 Denver Nuggets season was their 16th season, and their seventh in the NBA. The Nuggets head coach was Doug Moe and his assistant coach was Bill Ficke.

In the playoffs, the Nuggets defeated the Phoenix Suns in three games in the First Round, before losing to the San Antonio Spurs in five games in the Semi-finals.

== Draft picks ==
Round	Pick	Player	Position	Nationality	School/Club team
1	19	Rob Williams	PG	United States	Houston
3	62	Roylin Bond		United States	Pepperdine
4	84	Alford Turner		United States	Southwest Louisiana
5	109	Bill Duffy		United States	Santa Clara
6	131	Chris Brust		United States	North Carolina
7	153	Jeb Barlow		United States	North Carolina
8	178	Donnie Speer		United States	Alabama-Birmingham
9	200	Dean Sears		United States	UCLA
10	220	Mike Phillips		United States	Niagara

== Roster ==
1982–83 Denver Nuggets roster
Players

Pos.	No.	Player	Height	Weight	DOB	From
PG	20	Dwight Anderson	6 ft 3 in (1.91 m)	185 lb (84 kg)		USC
SG	23	T.R. Dunn	6 ft 4 in (1.93 m)	192 lb (87 kg)		Alabama
SF	2	Alex English	6 ft 7 in (2.01 m)	190 lb (86 kg)		South Carolina
G	5	Mike Evans	6 ft 1 in (1.85 m)	170 lb (77 kg)		Kansas State
F	22	Glen Gondrezick	6 ft 6 in (1.98 m)	218 lb (99 kg)		UNLV
PF	24	Bill Hanzlik	6 ft 7 in (2.01 m)	185 lb (84 kg)		Notre Dame
C	44	Dan Issel	6 ft 9 in (2.06 m)	235 lb (107 kg)		Kentucky
C	53	Rich Kelley	7 ft 0 in (2.13 m)	253 lb (115 kg)		Stanford
G	7	Billy McKinney	6 ft 0 in (1.83 m)	170 lb (77 kg)		Northwestern
G	43	James Ray	6 ft 8 in (2.03 m)	215 lb (98 kg)		Jacksonville
C	25	Dave Robisch	6 ft 10 in (2.08 m)	235 lb (107 kg)		Kansas
C	34	Danny Schayes	6 ft 11 in (2.11 m)	235 lb (107 kg)		Syracuse
PF	55	Kiki Vandeweghe	6 ft 8 in (2.03 m)	220 lb (100 kg)		UCLA
PG	21	Rob Williams	6 ft 2 in (1.88 m)	175 lb (79 kg)		Houston

Coaches
Head coach
- (United States) Doug Moe

Legend
- (DP) Unsigned draft pick
- (FA) Free agent
- (S) Suspended
- Injured

== Regular season ==
=== Season standings ===
Midwest Division	W	L	PCT	GB	Home	Road	Div
y-San Antonio Spurs	53	29	.646	–	31–10	22–19	21–9
x-Denver Nuggets	45	37	.549	8	29–12	16–25	17–13
Kansas City Kings	45	37	.549	8	30–11	15–26	18–12
Dallas Mavericks	38	44	.463	15	23–18	15–26	15–15
Utah Jazz	30	52	.366	23	21–20	9–32	15–15
Houston Rockets	14	68	.171	39	9–32	5–36	4–26

#	Western Conference				
#	Team	W	L	PCT	GB
1	c-Los Angeles Lakers	58	24	.707	–
2	y-San Antonio Spurs	53	29	.646	5
3	x-Phoenix Suns	53	29	.646	5
4	x-Seattle SuperSonics	48	34	.585	10
5	x-Portland Trail Blazers	46	36	.561	12
6	x-Denver Nuggets	45	37	.549	13
7	Kansas City Kings	45	37	.549	13
8	Dallas Mavericks	38	44	.463	20
9	Utah Jazz	30	52	.366	28
9	Golden State Warriors	30	52	.366	28
11	San Diego Clippers	25	57	.305	33
12	Houston Rockets	14	68	.171	44

Notes

- z, y – division champions
- x – clinched playoff spot

== Game log ==
=== Regular season ===
1982–83 game log
Total: 45–37 (home: 29–12; road: 16–25)
October: 1–1 (home: 1–1; road: 0–0)

Game	Date	Team	Score	High points	High rebounds	High assists	Location Attendance	Record
1	October 29	Dallas	L 117–125				McNichols Sports Arena	0–1
2	October 31	Phoenix	W 114–110				McNichols Sports Arena	1–1

November: 6–9 (home: 3–4; road: 3–5)

Game	Date	Team	Score	High points	High rebounds	High assists	Location Attendance	Record
3	November 3	Los Angeles	L 134–135 (OT)				McNichols Sports Arena	1–2
4	November 4	@ Los Angeles	L 108–131				The Forum	1–3
5	November 6	Golden State	W 127–118				McNichols Sports Arena	2–3
6	November 9	Atlanta	L 105–106				McNichols Sports Arena	2–4
7	November 10	@ Utah	L 119–125				Salt Palace Acord Arena	2–5
8	November 12	Portland	L 111–128				McNichols Sports Arena	2–6
9	November 13	@ Dallas	W 140–130				Reunion Arena	3–6
10	November 16	@ San Diego	W 136–130				San Diego Sports Arena	4–6
11	November 18	@ Phoenix	W 118–107				Arizona Veterans Memorial Coliseum	5–6
12	November 21	@ Los Angeles	L 129–143				The Forum	5–7
13	November 23	@ San Antonio	L 126–136				HemisFair Arena	5–8
14	November 24	San Antonio	W 129–123				McNichols Sports Arena	6–8
15	November 26	@ Seattle	L 106–127				Kingdome	6–9
16	November 27	San Diego	W 141–125				McNichols Sports Arena	7–9
17	November 30	Dallas	L 129–140				McNichols Sports Arena	7–10

December: 6–7 (home: 3–3; road: 3–4)

Game	Date	Team	Score	High points	High rebounds	High assists	Location Attendance	Record
18	December 3	Chicago	W 132–124				McNichols Sports Arena	8–10
19	December 8	@ Indiana	L 126–130				Market Square Arena	8–11
20	December 9	@ Washington	L 90–98				Capital Centre	8–12
21	December 10	@ Cleveland	W 117–107				Richfield Coliseum	9–12
22	December 12	@ Boston	L 112–126				Boston Garden	9–13
23	December 15	@ Milwaukee	W 113–98				MECCA Arena	10–13
24	December 16	San Antonio	L 108–120				McNichols Sports Arena	10–14
25	December 18	New Jersey	L 114–123				McNichols Sports Arena	10–15
26	December 22	@ Kansas City	L 102–146				Kemper Arena	10–16
27	December 23	@ Detroit	W 131–120				Pontiac Silverdome	11–16
28	December 27	Golden State	W 130–128				McNichols Sports Arena	12–16
29	December 28	Indiana	W 155–150 (OT)				McNichols Sports Arena	13–16
30	December 30	Boston	L 132–145				McNichols Sports Arena	13–17

January: 9–7 (home: 7–1; road: 2–6)

Game	Date	Team	Score	High points	High rebounds	High assists	Location Attendance	Record
31	January 1	Phoenix	W 127–125				McNichols Sports Arena	14–17
32	January 2	@ Portland	L 104–122				Memorial Coliseum	14–18
33	January 4	Kansas City	W 137–121				McNichols Sports Arena	15–18
34	January 5	@ Kansas City	L 118–138				Kemper Arena	15–19
35	January 7	Houston	W 125–97				McNichols Sports Arena	16–19
36	January 8	@ San Diego	L 120–122				San Diego Sports Arena	16–20
37	January 11	@ Seattle	W 131–119				Kingdome	17–20
38	January 12	Utah	W 126–118				McNichols Sports Arena	18–20
39	January 14	@ Dallas	L 139–149				Reunion Arena	18–21
40	January 15	@ Houston	W 131–111				The Summit	19–21
41	January 18	@ San Antonio	L 124–143				HemisFair Arena	19–22
42	January 19	Houston	W 130–93				McNichols Sports Arena	20–22
43	January 21	@ Golden State	L 121–136				Oakland–Alameda County Coliseum Arena	20–23
44	January 22	New York	L 98–102				McNichols Sports Arena	20–24
45	January 25	Kansas City	W 119–112				McNichols Sports Arena	21–24
46	January 28	Portland	W 118–109				McNichols Sports Arena	22–24

February: 7–6 (home: 4–1; road: 3–5)

Game	Date	Team	Score	High points	High rebounds	High assists	Location Attendance	Record
47	February 1	Philadelphia	L 124–133				McNichols Sports Arena	22–25
48	February 2	@ Houston	L 128–135				The Summit	22–26
49	February 3	@ Atlanta	W 126–112				The Omni	23–26
50	February 5	Utah	W 143–136				McNichols Sports Arena	24–26
51	February 8	@ San Diego	L 98–125				San Diego Sports Arena	24–27
52	February 9	Seattle	W 134–125				McNichols Sports Arena	25–27
All-Star Break
53	February 16	@ Philadelphia	L 95–116				The Spectrum	25–28
54	February 17	@ New Jersey	W 117–108				Brendan Byrne Arena	26–28
55	February 19	@ New York	L 115–124				Madison Square Garden	26–29
56	February 22	@ Chicago	L 133–144				Chicago Stadium	26–30
57	February 24	Seattle	W 138–129				McNichols Sports Arena	27–30
58	February 26	Washington	W 125–111				McNichols Sports Arena	28–30
59	February 27	@ Los Angeles	W 135–120				The Forum	29–30

March: 10–5 (home: 7–2; road: 3–3)

Game	Date	Team	Score	High points	High rebounds	High assists	Location Attendance	Record
60	March 1	Cleveland	W 132–121				McNichols Sports Arena	30–30
61	March 2	@ Golden State	W 128–108				Oakland–Alameda County Coliseum Arena	31–30
62	March 4	@ Portland	W 142–138				Memorial Coliseum	32–30
63	March 5	Milwaukee	W 126–120				McNichols Sports Arena	33–30
64	March 8	San Antonio	W 129–118				McNichols Sports Arena	34–30
65	March 9	@ Utah	W 122–109				Salt Palace Acord Arena	35–30
66	March 13	Utah	W 130–117				McNichols Sports Arena	36–30
67	March 15	Golden State	W 139–115				McNichols Sports Arena	37–30
68	March 18	@ Seattle	L 117–147				Kingdome	37–31
69	March 20	Portland	L 106–118				McNichols Sports Arena	37–32
70	March 22	Phoenix	W 130–117				McNichols Sports Arena	38–32
71	March 25	Detroit	W 131–120				McNichols Sports Arena	39–32
72	March 26	@ Phoenix	L 110–124				Arizona Veterans Memorial Coliseum	39–33
73	March 29	@ San Antonio	L 129–136				HemisFair Arena	39–34
74	March 31	Los Angeles	L 116–122				McNichols Sports Arena	39–35

April: 6–2 (home: 4–0; road: 2–2)

Game	Date	Team	Score	High points	High rebounds	High assists	Location Attendance	Record
75	April 2	San Diego	W 107–99				McNichols Sports Arena	40–35
76	April 6	@ Kansas City	L 113–130				Kemper Arena	40–36
77	April 8	@ Dallas	W 132–115				Reunion Arena	41–36
78	April 9	@ Houston	W 123–105				The Summit	42–36
79	April 12	@ Utah	L 116–125				Salt Palace Acord Arena	42–37
80	April 13	Houston	W 131–112				McNichols Sports Arena	43–37
81	April 15	Dallas	W 137–126				McNichols Sports Arena	44–37
82	April 17	Kansas City	W 125–116				McNichols Sports Arena	45–37

1982–83 schedule

=== Playoffs ===
1983 playoff game log
Western Conference First Round: 2–1 (home: 1–0; road: 1–1)

Game	Date	Team	Score	High points	High rebounds	High assists	Location Attendance	Series
1	April 19	@ Phoenix	L 108–121	VanDeWeghe (32)	Dunn (12)	English, Evans (4)	Arizona Veterans Memorial Coliseum; 11,901	0–1
2	April 21	Phoenix	W 113–99	VanDeWeghe (26)	Issel (11)	Rob Williams (9)	McNichols Sports Arena; 15,903	1–1
3	April 24	@ Phoenix	W 117–112 (OT)	English (42)	Dunn (12)	Dunn, Williams (6)	Arizona Veterans Memorial Coliseum; 14,660	2–1

Western Conference Semifinals: 1–4 (home: 1–1; road: 0–3)

Game	Date	Team	Score	High points	High rebounds	High assists	Location Attendance	Series
1	April 26	@ San Antonio	L 133–152	Issel (28)	Dunn (11)	English, Williams (7)	HemisFair Arena; 10,116	0–1
2	April 27	@ San Antonio	L 109–126	VanDeWeghe (22)	Dunn (8)	Evans (9)	HemisFair Arena; 10,690	0–2
3	April 29	San Antonio	L 126–127 (OT)	English (39)	VanDeWeghe (14)	English, Williams (7)	McNichols Sports Arena; 16,965	0–3
4	May 2	San Antonio	W 124–114	VanDeWeghe (37)	VanDeWeghe (11)	English (11)	McNichols Sports Arena; 15,035	1–3
5	May 4	@ San Antonio	L 105–145	McKinney (20)	Dunn (8)	Evans (6)	HemisFair Arena; 12,736	1–4

1983 schedule

== Awards and records ==
- Alex English, All-NBA Second Team
- T.R. Dunn, NBA All-Defensive Second Team
