= 1982–83 Dallas Mavericks season =

NBA professional basketball team season

- Head coach: Dick Motta
- General manager: Norm Sonju
- Owner: Don Carter
- Arena: Reunion Arena

Results
- Record: 38–44 (.463)
- Place: Division: 4th (Midwest); Conference: 8th (Western)
- Playoff finish: Did not qualify
- Stats at Basketball Reference

The 1982–83 Dallas Mavericks season was the team's third season in the National Basketball Association (NBA).

== Draft picks ==
Round	Pick	Player	Position	Nationality	College/Team
1	4	Bill Garnett	SF	United States	Wyoming
3	50	Corny Thompson	PF	United States	Connecticut
4	73	Rudy Woods	C	United States	Texas A&M
5	96	Ken Arnold		United States	Iowa
6	119	Wayne Waggoner		United States	Northwestern State
7	142	Bob Grady		United States	Northwestern State
8	165	Keith Peterson		United States	Arkansas
9	188	Ralph McPherson		United States	Texas−Arlington
10	209	Albert Culton		United States	Texas−Arlington

== Roster ==
1982–83 Dallas Mavericks roster
Players

Pos.	No.	Player	Height	Weight	DOB	From
SF	24	Mark Aguirre	6 ft 6 in (1.98 m)	232 lb (105 kg)	1959-12-10	DePaul
SG	22	Rolando Blackman	6 ft 6 in (1.98 m)	190 lb (86 kg)	1959-02-26	Kansas State
SF	23	Allan Bristow	6 ft 7 in (2.01 m)	210 lb (95 kg)	1951-08-23	Virginia Tech
C	42	Pat Cummings	6 ft 9 in (2.06 m)	230 lb (104 kg)	1956-07-11	Cincinnati
PG	15	Brad Davis	6 ft 3 in (1.91 m)	180 lb (82 kg)	1955-12-17	Maryland
C	20	Bill Garnett	6 ft 9 in (2.06 m)	225 lb (102 kg)	1960-04-22	Wyoming
C	40	Kurt Nimphius	6 ft 10 in (2.08 m)	218 lb (99 kg)	1958-03-13	Arizona State
PG	14	Kelvin Ransey	6 ft 1 in (1.85 m)	170 lb (77 kg)	1958-05-03	Ohio State
SG	34	Jim Spanarkel	6 ft 5 in (1.96 m)	190 lb (86 kg)	1957-06-28	Duke
PF	25	Corny Thompson	6 ft 8 in (2.03 m)	225 lb (102 kg)	1960-02-05	Connecticut
SF	33	Elston Turner	6 ft 5 in (1.96 m)	190 lb (86 kg)	1959-06-10	Mississippi
PF	31	Jay Vincent	6 ft 7 in (2.01 m)	220 lb (100 kg)	1959-06-10	Michigan State

Coaches
Head coach
- Dick Motta
Assistant(s)
- Bob Weiss

Legend
- (DP) Unsigned draft pick
- (FA) Free agent
- (S) Suspended
- Injured

Roster
Updated: December 21, 1982

== Regular season ==
=== Season standings ===
Midwest Division	W	L	PCT	GB	Home	Road	Div
y-San Antonio Spurs	53	29	.646	–	31–10	22–19	21–9
x-Denver Nuggets	45	37	.549	8	29–12	16–25	17–13
Kansas City Kings	45	37	.549	8	30–11	15–26	18–12
Dallas Mavericks	38	44	.463	15	23–18	15–26	15–15
Utah Jazz	30	52	.366	23	21–20	9–32	15–15
Houston Rockets	14	68	.171	39	9–32	5–36	4–26

#	Western Conference				
#	Team	W	L	PCT	GB
1	c-Los Angeles Lakers	58	24	.707	–
2	y-San Antonio Spurs	53	29	.646	5
3	x-Phoenix Suns	53	29	.646	5
4	x-Seattle SuperSonics	48	34	.585	10
5	x-Portland Trail Blazers	46	36	.561	12
6	x-Denver Nuggets	45	37	.549	13
7	Kansas City Kings	45	37	.549	13
8	Dallas Mavericks	38	44	.463	20
9	Utah Jazz	30	52	.366	28
9	Golden State Warriors	30	52	.366	28
11	San Diego Clippers	25	57	.305	33
12	Houston Rockets	14	68	.171	44

== Game log ==
=== Regular season ===
1982–83 game log
Total: 38–44 (Home: 0–0; Road: 0–0)
October: 0–0 (home: 0–0; road: 0–0)

Game	Date	Team	Score	High points	High rebounds	High assists	Location Attendance	Record
1	October 29; 8:35 p.m. CDT	@ Denver	W 125–117	Blackman (26)	Cummings (8)	Davis (7)	McNichols Sports Arena; 12,099	1–0

November: 0–0 (home: 0–0; road: 0–0)

Game	Date	Team	Score	High points	High rebounds	High assists	Location Attendance	Record
8	November 12; 6:30 p.m. CST	@ Boston	L 110–118	Aguirre, Blackman (21)	Nimphius (6)	Aguirre, Davis (6)	Boston Garden; 15,320	4–4
9	November 13; 7:35 p.m. CST	Denver	L 130–140	Aguirre (28)	Lloyd; Ransey (8)	Aguirre, Ransey (6)	Reunion Arena; 10,283	4–5
10	November 17; 7:35 p.m. CST	Los Angeles	W 118–117	Blackman (24)	Cummings (17)	Vincent (6)	Reunion Arena; 17,134	5–5
14	November 30; 8:35 p.m. CST	@ Denver	W 140–129	Aguirre (37)	Cummings (10)	Davis (9)	McNichols Sports Arena; 8,799	7–7

December: 0–0 (home: 0–0; road: 0–0)

Game	Date	Team	Score	High points	High rebounds	High assists	Location Attendance	Record
24	December 19; 9:30 p.m. CST	@ Los Angeles	L 108–110	Aguirre (20)	Garnett (15)	Davis, Vincent (7)	The Forum; 14,094	11–13

January: 0–0 (home: 0–0; road: 0–0)

Game	Date	Team	Score	High points	High rebounds	High assists	Location Attendance	Record
33	January 8; 7:35 p.m. CST	Boston	L 110–114	Aguirre (32)	Vincent (10)	Davis (12)	Reunion Arena; 17,134	13–20
36	January 14; 7:35 p.m. CST	Denver	W 149–139	Aguirre (30)	Cummings (12)	Aguirre (16)	Reunion Arena; 11,015	15–21

February: 0–0 (home: 0–0; road: 0–0)

Game	Date	Team	Score	High points	High rebounds	High assists	Location Attendance	Record
45	February 2; 7:35 p.m. CST	Los Angeles	W 122–120	Aguirre (31)	Vincent (15)	Aguirre (11)	Reunion Arena; 17,134	22–23
All-Star Break
51	February 17; 7:10 p.m. CST	Los Angeles	L 110–127	Aguirre (22)	Vincent (9)	Davis (9)	Reunion Arena; 17,134	25–26

March: 0–0 (home: 0–0; road: 0–0)

Game	Date	Team	Score	High points	High rebounds	High assists	Location Attendance	Record
69	March 20; 9:30 p.m. CST	@ Los Angeles	L 110–117	Aguirre (33)	Vincent (15)	Davis (6)	The Forum; 17,505	34–35

April: 0–0 (home: 0–0; road: 0–0)

Game	Date	Team	Score	High points	High rebounds	High assists	Location Attendance	Record
78	April 8; 7:35 p.m. CST	Denver	L 115–132	Ransey (19)	Nimphius (11)	Aguirre (8)	Reunion Arena; 10,878	36–42
81	April 15; 8:35 p.m. CST	@ Denver	L 126–137	Aguirre (31)	Cummings (11)	Davis (13)	McNichols Sports Arena; 15,039	38–43

1982–83 schedule

== Player statistics ==
=== Ragular season ===
Player	POS	GP	GS	MP	REB	AST	STL	BLK	PTS	MPG	RPG	APG	SPG	BPG	PPG
Mark Aguirre	SF	81	75	2,784	508	332	80	26	1,979	34.4	6.3	4.1	1.0	.3	24.4
Jay Vincent	PF	81	73	2,726	592	212	70	45	1,513	33.7	7.3	2.6	.9	.6	18.7
Pat Cummings	C	81	71	2,317	668	144	57	35	1,014	28.6	8.2	1.8	.7	.4	12.5
Kurt Nimphius	C	81	12	1,515	404	115	24	111	426	18.7	5.0	1.4	.3	1.4	5.3
Brad Davis	PG	79	78	2,323	198	565	80	11	915	29.4	2.5	7.2	1.0	.1	11.6
Kelvin Ransey	PG	76	4	1,607	147	280	58	4	840	21.1	1.9	3.7	.8	.1	11.1
Rolando Blackman	SG	75	62	2,349	293	185	37	29	1,326	31.3	3.9	2.5	.5	.4	17.7
Bill Garnett	C	75	13	1,411	406	103	48	70	469	18.8	5.4	1.4	.6	.9	6.3
Elston Turner	SF	59	16	879	152	88	47	0	214	14.9	2.6	1.5	.8	.0	3.6
Jim Spanarkel	SG	48	4	722	84	78	27	3	272	15.0	1.8	1.6	.6	.1	5.7
Corny Thompson	PF	44	2	520	120	34	12	7	122	11.8	2.7	.8	.3	.2	2.8
Allan Bristow	SF	37	0	371	59	70	6	1	104	10.0	1.6	1.9	.2	.0	2.8
Scott Lloyd	C	15	0	206	46	21	6	6	49	13.7	3.1	1.4	.4	.4	3.3
