= 1982–83 Phoenix Suns season =

NBA team season

- Head coach: John MacLeod
- General manager: Jerry Colangelo
- Owners: Karl Eller, Don Pitt, Don Diamond, Bhavik Darji, Marvin Meyer, Richard L. Bloch
- Arena: Arizona Veterans Memorial Coliseum

Results
- Record: 53–29 (.646)
- Place: Division: 2nd (Pacific); Conference: 3rd (Western)
- Playoff finish: First round (lost to Nuggets 1–2)
- Stats at Basketball Reference

Local media
- Television: KNXV
- Radio: KTAR

The 1982–83 Phoenix Suns season was the 15th season for the Phoenix Suns of the National Basketball Association. The Suns were in the playoffs for the sixth consecutive season, extending a then-franchise record. The Suns were eliminated in the first round two games to one by the Denver Nuggets, a team they had beaten by the same margin a year earlier. The Suns were led by head coach John MacLeod and played all home games in Arizona Veterans Memorial Coliseum.

Walter Davis led the Suns in scoring with 19 points per game. Second-year player Larry Nance, who finished the season fourth in the NBA in blocks per game, was second in team scoring at 16.7, while fellow big man Maurice Lucas averaged a double-double with 16.5 points and 10.4 rebounds a contest. Lucas, a 30-year-old veteran who had played for four NBA teams and one ABA team before reaching the Suns, returned to his first All-Star Game after two seasons when he suited up with Phoenix. Point guard Dennis Johnson earned another spot on the NBA All-Defensive First Team.

== Offseason ==
=== NBA draft ===
Round	Pick	Player	Position	Nationality	College
1	15	David Thirdkill	Forward	United States	Bradley
2	39	Kevin Magee	Forward	United States	UC Irvine
3	61	Charles Pittman	Forward	United States	Maryland
4	86	Rory White	Forward	United States	South Alabama
5	108	Marvin McCrary	Guard	United States	Missouri
6	130	Jake Bethany	Center	United States	Hardin–Simmons
7	155	Phil Ward	Guard	United States	North Carolina Charlotte
8	177	Rick Elrod	Guard	United States	Georgetown (KY)
9	199	Ken Lyles	Forward	United States	Washington
10	221	Dale Wilkinson	Center	United States	Idaho State

== Roster ==
1982–83 Phoenix Suns roster
Players

Pos.	No.	Player	Height	Weight	DOB	From
C	33	Alvan Adams	6 ft 9 in (2.06 m)	210 lb (95 kg)	1954-07-19	Oklahoma
G	6	Walter Davis	6 ft 6 in (1.98 m)	193 lb (88 kg)	1954-09-09	North Carolina
C	53	James Edwards	7 ft 0 in (2.13 m)	225 lb (102 kg)	1955-11-22	Washington
G	11	Johnny High	6 ft 3 in (1.91 m)	185 lb (84 kg)	1957-04-25	Nevada
G	24	Dennis Johnson	6 ft 4 in (1.93 m)	185 lb (84 kg)	1954-09-18	Pepperdine
F/C	50	Joel Kramer	6 ft 7 in (2.01 m)	203 lb (92 kg)	1955-11-30	San Diego State
F	20	Maurice Lucas	6 ft 9 in (2.06 m)	215 lb (98 kg)	1952-02-18	Marquette
G	4	Kyle Macy	6 ft 3 in (1.91 m)	175 lb (79 kg)	1957-04-09	Kentucky
F	22	Larry Nance	6 ft 10 in (2.08 m)	205 lb (93 kg)	1959-02-12	Clemson
F	32	Charles Pittman	6 ft 8 in (2.03 m)	220 lb (100 kg)	1958-03-23	Maryland
F	14	Alvin Scott	6 ft 7 in (2.01 m)	185 lb (84 kg)	1955-09-14	Oral Roberts
F	40	David Thirdkill	6 ft 7 in (2.01 m)	195 lb (88 kg)	1960-04-12	Bradley
F	7	Rory White	6 ft 8 in (2.03 m)	210 lb (95 kg)	1959-08-16	South Alabama

Coaches
Head coach
- John MacLeod (Bellarmine)
Assistant(s)
- Al Bianchi (Bowling Green)
- John Wetzel (Virginia Tech)

Legend
- (DP) Unsigned draft pick
- (FA) Free agent
- (S) Suspended
- Injured

== Regular season ==
=== Standings ===
Pacific Division	W	L	PCT	GB	Home	Road	Div
y-Los Angeles Lakers	58	24	.707	–	33–8	25–16	21–9
x-Phoenix Suns	53	29	.646	5	32–9	21–20	21–9
x-Seattle SuperSonics	48	34	.585	10	29–12	19–22	14–16
x-Portland Trail Blazers	46	36	.561	12	31–10	15–26	16–14
Golden State Warriors	30	52	.366	28	21–20	9–32	11–19
San Diego Clippers	25	57	.305	33	18–23	7–34	7–23

#	Western Conference				
#	Team	W	L	PCT	GB
1	c-Los Angeles Lakers	58	24	.707	–
2	y-San Antonio Spurs	53	29	.646	5
3	x-Phoenix Suns	53	29	.646	5
4	x-Seattle SuperSonics	48	34	.585	10
5	x-Portland Trail Blazers	46	36	.561	12
6	x-Denver Nuggets	45	37	.549	13
7	Kansas City Kings	45	37	.549	13
8	Dallas Mavericks	38	44	.463	20
9	Utah Jazz	30	52	.366	28
9	Golden State Warriors	30	52	.366	28
11	San Diego Clippers	25	57	.305	33
12	Houston Rockets	14	68	.171	44

== Playoffs ==
=== Game log ===
1983 playoff game log
First Round: 1–2 (home: 1–1; road: 0–1)

Game	Date	Team	Score	High points	High rebounds	High assists	Location Attendance	Series
1	April 19	Denver	W 121–108	Dennis Johnson (28)	Dennis Johnson (12)	Dennis Johnson (8)	Arizona Veterans Memorial Coliseum; 11,901	1–0
2	April 21	@ Denver	L 99–113	Walter Davis (31)	James Edwards (9)	Dennis Johnson (5)	McNichols Sports Arena; 15,903	1–1
3	April 24	Denver	L 112–117 (OT)	Walter Davis (29)	Larry Nance (12)	Alvan Adams (9)	Arizona Veterans Memorial Coliseum; 14,660	1–2

1983 schedule

== Awards and honors ==
=== All-Star ===
- Maurice Lucas was voted as a starter for the Western Conference in the All-Star Game. Lucas finished first in voting among Western Conference forwards with 431,288 votes. It was his fifth All-Star selection.
- The other Suns player receiving All-Star votes was Dennis Johnson (306,470).

=== Season ===
- Dennis Johnson was named to the NBA All-Defensive First Team.
- Maurice Lucas finished 14th in MVP voting.

== Player statistics ==
Legend
GP	Games played	GS	Games started	MPG	Minutes per game
FG%	Field-goal percentage	3P%	3-point field-goal percentage	FT%	Free-throw percentage
RPG	Rebounds per game	APG	Assists per game	SPG	Steals per game
BPG	Blocks per game	PPG	Points per game

=== Season ===
Phoenix Suns statistics
Player	GP	GS	MPG	FG%	3P%	FT%	RPG	APG	SPG	BPG	PPG
Alvan Adams	80	75	30.6	.486	.333	.829	6.9	4.7	1.4	.9	14.2
Jeff Cook*	45	2	12.2	.430	.000	.759	2.9	1.3	.3	.3	3.6
Walter Davis	80	79	31.1	.516	.304	.818	2.5	5.0	1.5	.2	19.0
James Edwards*	16	1	17.8	.487	.	.660	3.7	1.7	.3	.3	8.8
Johnny High	82	2	14.1	.461	.200	.463	1.8	1.9	1.0	.4	3.2
Dennis Johnson	77	74	33.1	.462	.161	.791	4.4	5.0	1.3	.5	14.2
Joel Kramer	54	4	8.5	.423	.000	.875^	1.6	0.7	.3	.1	1.9
Maurice Lucas	77	71	33.6	.474	.333	.781	10.4	2.8	.7	.6	16.5
Kyle Macy	82	9	22.4	.517	.303	.872^	2.0	3.4	.8	.1	9.9
Larry Nance	82	82	35.5	.550	.333	.672	8.7	2.4	1.2	2.6	16.7
Charles Pittman	28	0	6.1	.475	.000	.676	1.1	0.3	.1	.3	2.3
Alvin Scott	81	9	14.1	.479	.000	.736	2.8	1.2	.6	.4	4.1
David Thirdkill	49	2	10.6	.435	.143	.577	1.5	0.7	.4	.1	4.0
Rory White	65	0	9.6	.543	.000	.642	1.6	0.5	.2	.0	5.0

* – Stats with the Suns.
^ – Minimum 125 free throws made.

=== Playoffs ===
Phoenix Suns statistics
Player	GP	GS	MPG	FG%	3P%	FT%	RPG	APG	SPG	BPG	PPG
Alvan Adams	3	3	28.0	.469	.	.714	6.0	4.7	.7	1.7	11.7
Walter Davis	3	3	37.7	.435	.500	.810	5.0	4.3	2.0	1.7	26.0
James Edwards	3	0	18.0	.423	.	1.000	6.0	1.3	.3	.3	9.3
Johnny High	3	0	15.0	.455	.000	.000	3.3	2.0	1.0	.3	3.3
Dennis Johnson	3	3	36.0	.458	.000	.833	7.7	5.7	1.7	.7	18.0
Joel Kramer	2	0	3.0	.000	.	.	0.0	0.0	.0	.0	0.0
Maurice Lucas	2	2	28.5	.571	.	.500	6.0	4.0	1.5	.0	13.0
Kyle Macy	3	0	24.0	.429	.000	.714	2.7	3.0	.3	.0	11.7
Larry Nance	3	3	34.3	.400	.	.800	8.3	1.0	1.0	2.0	12.0
Charles Pittman	1	0	1.0	.	.	.	0.0	0.0	.0	.0	0.0
Alvin Scott	3	1	20.7	.462	.	1.000	4.0	1.7	.7	1.7	4.7
Rory White	3	0	13.3	.500	.000	.500	3.3	0.0	.0	.0	5.3

== Transactions ==
=== Trades ===
June 21, 1982	To Denver Nuggets (United States) Rich Kelley	To Phoenix Suns 1982 first-round draft pick ( (United States) David Thirdkill)
July 7, 1982	To New York Knicks (United States) Truck Robinson	To Phoenix Suns (United States) Maurice Lucas
February 7, 1983	To Cleveland Cavaliers (United States) Jeff Cook 1983 first-round draft pick ( (United States) Roy Hinson) 1983 third-round draft pick ( (United States) Derrick Hord) Cash considerations	To Phoenix Suns (United States) James Edwards 1983 first-round draft pick ( (United States) Greg Kite)

=== Free agents ===
==== Additions ====
Date	Player	Contract	Old Team
May 17, 1982	Art Housey	Undisclosed	
July 7, 1982	Johnny High	Undisclosed	Phoenix Suns
February 7, 1983	Charles Pittman	Undisclosed	Phoenix Suns

==== Subtractions ====
Date	Player	Reason left	New team
July 1, 1982	Dudley Bradley	Waived	Chicago Bulls
October 21, 1982	Art Housey	Waived	
October 28, 1982	Charles Pittman	Waived	Phoenix Suns
December 21, 1982	Craig Dykema	Waived	
