= 1982–83 Portland Trail Blazers season =

NBA professional basketball team season

- Head coach: Jack Ramsay
- General manager: Stu Inman
- Owner: Larry Weinberg
- Arena: Memorial Coliseum

Results
- Record: 46–36 (.561)
- Place: Division: 4th (Pacific); Conference: 5th (Western)
- Playoff finish: Conference semifinals (lost to Lakers 1–4)
- Stats at Basketball Reference

The 1982–83 Portland Trail Blazers season was the 13th season of the Portland Trail Blazers in the National Basketball Association (NBA). The Blazers finished 46–36, a four-game improvement from the previous season.

In the 1983 NBA Playoffs, the Blazers won their first playoff series since their championship season of 1976–77, defeating the Seattle SuperSonics in their first-round best-of-three series in a two-game sweep and gaining a measure of revenge for the Sonics' having eliminated them from the postseason in 1978 and 1980.

However, the Blazers were bested in their Western Conference semi-final series against the Los Angeles Lakers four games to one, on the Lakers' way to the 1983 NBA Finals.

The 1982–83 NBA season saw the beginning of an unprecedented playoff streak for the Blazers, as they would go on to qualify for 21 consecutive postseasons. The second longest NBA playoff streak behind the Syracuse Nationals/Philadelphia 76ers who made the playoffs every year from 1950 to 1971, and the San Antonio Spurs who made the playoffs every year from 1998 to 2019.

== Draft picks ==
Note: This is not a complete list; only the first two rounds are covered, as well as any other picks by the franchise who played at least one NBA game.

Round	Pick	Player	Position	Nationality	School/Club team
1	11	Lafayette Lever	G	United States	Arizona State

== Roster ==
Portland Trail Blazers roster
Players

Pos.	No.	Player	Height	Weight	DOB	From
G	10	Don Buse	6 ft 4 in (1.93 m)	190 lb (86 kg)		Evansville
F	34	Kenny Carr	6 ft 7 in (2.01 m)	220 lb (100 kg)		NC State
F/C	42	Wayne Cooper	6 ft 10 in (2.08 m)	220 lb (100 kg)		New Orleans
F	22	Jeff Judkins	6 ft 6 in (1.98 m)	185 lb (84 kg)		Utah
F	3	Jeff Lamp	6 ft 6 in (1.98 m)	195 lb (88 kg)		Virginia
PG	12	Fat Lever	6 ft 3 in (1.91 m)	170 lb (77 kg)		Arizona State
SF	33	Calvin Natt	6 ft 6 in (1.98 m)	220 lb (100 kg)		Louisiana–Monroe
C	24	Audie Norris	6 ft 9 in (2.06 m)	230 lb (104 kg)		Jackson State
G	4	Jim Paxson	6 ft 6 in (1.98 m)	200 lb (91 kg)		Dayton
F/C	43	Mychal Thompson	6 ft 10 in (2.08 m)	226 lb (103 kg)		Minnesota
G	10	Darnell Valentine	6 ft 1 in (1.85 m)	183 lb (83 kg)		Kansas
F	31	Pete Verhoeven	6 ft 9 in (2.06 m)	215 lb (98 kg)		Fresno State

Coaches
Head coach
- Jack Ramsay

Legend
- (DP) Unsigned draft pick
- (FA) Free agent
- (S) Suspended
- Injured

== Regular season ==
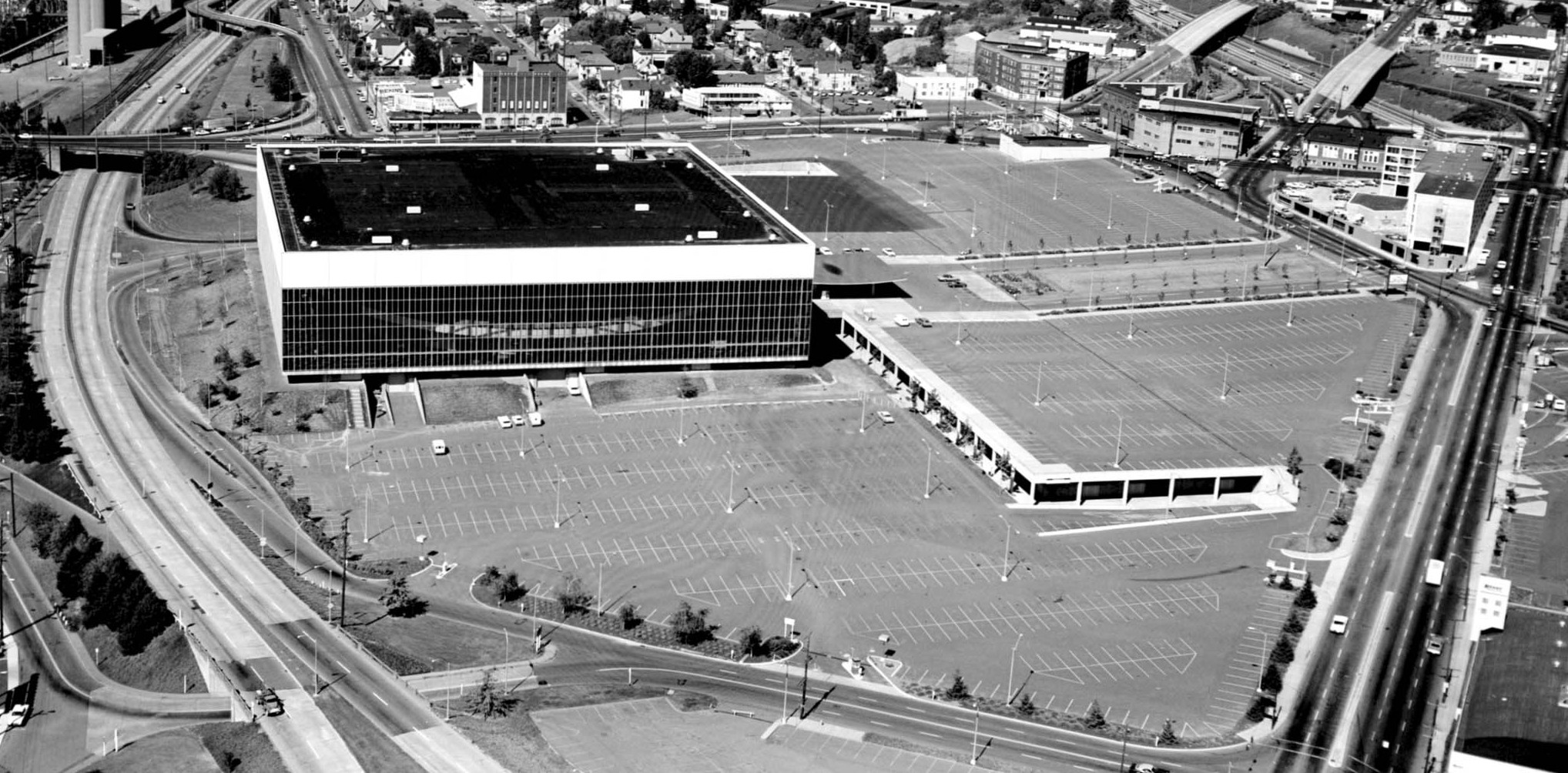
The Trail Blazers played their home games at Veterans Memorial Coliseum.

=== Season standings ===
Pacific Division	W	L	PCT	GB	Home	Road	Div
y-Los Angeles Lakers	58	24	.707	–	33–8	25–16	21–9
x-Phoenix Suns	53	29	.646	5	32–9	21–20	21–9
x-Seattle SuperSonics	48	34	.585	10	29–12	19–22	14–16
x-Portland Trail Blazers	46	36	.561	12	31–10	15–26	16–14
Golden State Warriors	30	52	.366	28	21–20	9–32	11–19
San Diego Clippers	25	57	.305	33	18–23	7–34	7–23

#	Western Conference				
#	Team	W	L	PCT	GB
1	c-Los Angeles Lakers	58	24	.707	–
2	y-San Antonio Spurs	53	29	.646	5
3	x-Phoenix Suns	53	29	.646	5
4	x-Seattle SuperSonics	48	34	.585	10
5	x-Portland Trail Blazers	46	36	.561	12
6	x-Denver Nuggets	45	37	.549	13
7	Kansas City Kings	45	37	.549	13
8	Dallas Mavericks	38	44	.463	20
9	Utah Jazz	30	52	.366	28
9	Golden State Warriors	30	52	.366	28
11	San Diego Clippers	25	57	.305	33
12	Houston Rockets	14	68	.171	44

z - clinched division title
y - clinched division title
x - clinched playoff spot

== Playoffs ==
1983 playoff game log
First round: 2–0 (home: 1–0; road: 1–0)

Game	Date	Team	Score	High points	High rebounds	High assists	Location Attendance	Series
1	April 20	@ Seattle	W 108–97	Thompson, Paxson (25)	Calvin Natt (11)	Mychal Thompson (8)	Kingdome; 9,211	1–0
2	April 22	Seattle	W 105–96	Jim Paxson (26)	Mychal Thompson (12)	Thompson, Lever (6)	Memorial Coliseum; 12,666	2–0

Conference Semi-finals: 1–4 (home: 1–1; road: 0–3)

Game	Date	Team	Score	High points	High rebounds	High assists	Location Attendance	Series
1	April 24	@ Los Angeles	L 97–118	Mychal Thompson (22)	Thompson, Natt (9)	three players tied (7)	The Forum; 13,891	0–1
2	April 26	@ Los Angeles	L 106–112	Calvin Natt (26)	Wayne Cooper (7)	Darnell Valentine (15)	The Forum; 16,239	0–2
3	April 29	Los Angeles	L 109–115 (OT)	Paxson, Natt (22)	Natt, Cooper (10)	Darnell Valentine (14)	Memorial Coliseum; 12,666	0–3
4	May 1	Los Angeles	W 108–95	Jim Paxson (20)	Calvin Natt (10)	Darnell Valentine (11)	Memorial Coliseum; 12,666	1–3
5	May 3	@ Los Angeles	L 108–116	Jim Paxson (32)	Calvin Natt (11)	Darnell Valentine (8)	The Forum; 16,739	1–4

1983 schedule

== Awards and honors ==
- Jim Paxson, NBA All-Star
