= John Greig (basketball) =

American basketball player (born 1961)

Personal information
- Born: April 28, 1961 (age 65) Sacramento, California
- Listed height: 6 ft 7 in (2.01 m)
- Listed weight: 215 lb (98 kg)

Career information
- High school: Timberline (Lacey, Washington)
- College: Wenatchee Valley (1978–1979); Oregon (1979–1982)
- NBA draft: 1982: 3rd round, 65th overall pick
- Drafted by: Seattle SuperSonics
- Position: Small forward
- Number: 22

Career history
- 1982–1983: Seattle SuperSonics
- Stats at NBA.com
- Stats at Basketball Reference

John W. Greig (born April 28, 1961, in Sacramento, California) is a retired American basketball player, formerly in the National Basketball Association (NBA). A 6-foot-7-inch (2.01 m) and 210-pound (95 kg) small forward, Greig played competitively at Timberline High School in Lacey, Washington and played college basketball at Wenatchee Valley Community College and at the University of Oregon.

Greig was selected in the third round of the 1982 NBA draft (65th overall) by the Seattle SuperSonics but played only nine games for them in the 1982–83 season, averaging 2.1 points and 0.7 rebounds per game. He also played professionally in Switzerland, France and Spain.

Presently Greig resides in Sammamish in Seattle, Washington and is a sports agent. His past clients include Ruben Douglas, the fifth-leading scorer in New Mexico Lobos men's basketball history; former NBA player Pops Mensah-Bonsu; and four-time NBA All-Star DeMarcus Cousins.

== Career statistics ==
Legend
GP	Games played	GS	Games started	MPG	Minutes per game
FG%	Field goal percentage	3P%	3-point field goal percentage	FT%	Free throw percentage
RPG	Rebounds per game	APG	Assists per game	SPG	Steals per game
BPG	Blocks per game	PPG	Points per game	**Bold**	Career high

=== NBA ===
==== Regular season ====
Year	Team	GP	GS	MPG	FG%	3P%	FT%	RPG	APG	SPG	BPG	PPG
1982–83	Seattle	9	0	2.9	.538	–	.833	.7	.0	.0	.1	2.1
