= 1982–83 San Diego Clippers season =

NBA professional basketball team season

- Head coach: Paul Silas
- Arena: San Diego Sports Arena

Results
- Record: 25–57 (.305)
- Place: Division: 6th (Pacific); Conference: 8th (Western)
- Playoff finish: Did not qualify
- Stats at Basketball Reference

Local media
- Television: XETV
- Radio: KCNN

The 1982–83 San Diego Clippers season was the Clippers' 13th season in the NBA and their 5th season in the city of San Diego. Midway through the season, the team changed their colors from light blue and orange to blue and red.

== Draft picks ==
Round	Pick	Player	Position	Nationality	School/Club team
1	2	Terry Cummings	Forward	United States	DePaul
2	32	Richard Anderson	Forward	United States	UC Santa Barbara
3	48	Craig Hodges	Guard	United States	Long Beach State
4	71	Darius Clemons	Guard	United States	Loyola (IL)
5	94	Gary Carter	Guard	United States	Tennessee
6	117	Eric Marbury	Guard	United States	Georgia
7	140	Eddie Hughes	Guard	United States	Colorado State
8	163	Jacques Tuz	Forward	United States	Colorado
9	186	John Hegwood	Guard	United States	San Francisco
10	207	Daryl Stovall	Guard	United States	Creighton

== Roster ==
1982–83 San Diego Clippers roster
Players

Pos.	No.	Player	Height	Weight	DOB	From
F	35	Richard Anderson	6 ft 10 in (2.08 m)	243 lb (110 kg)		UC Santa Barbara
G	15	Jim Brogan	6 ft 6 in (1.98 m)	180 lb (82 kg)		West Virginia Wesleyan
F	7	Michael Brooks	6 ft 7 in (2.01 m)	220 lb (100 kg)		La Salle
F	22	Tom Chambers	6 ft 10 in (2.08 m)	220 lb (100 kg)		Utah
C	23	Joe Cooper	6 ft 10 in (2.08 m)	230 lb (104 kg)		Colorado
F	34	Terry Cummings	6 ft 9 in (2.06 m)	220 lb (100 kg)		DePaul
G	13	John Douglas	6 ft 2 in (1.88 m)	180 lb (82 kg)		Kansas
G	30	Bobby Gross	6 ft 6 in (1.98 m)	200 lb (91 kg)		Long Beach State
G	24	Craig Hodges	6 ft 3 in (1.91 m)	185 lb (84 kg)		Long Beach State
G	9	Lionel Hollins	6 ft 3 in (1.91 m)	185 lb (84 kg)		Arizona State
F	23	Hutch Jones	6 ft 8 in (2.03 m)	196 lb (89 kg)		Vanderbilt
G	13	Lowes Moore	6 ft 1 in (1.85 m)	170 lb (77 kg)		West Virginia
C	31	Swen Nater	6 ft 11 in (2.11 m)	240 lb (109 kg)		UCLA
G	9	Randy Smith	6 ft 3 in (1.91 m)	185 lb (84 kg)		Buffalo State
G	9	Robert Smith	5 ft 11 in (1.80 m)	170 lb (77 kg)		UNLV
C	32	Bill Walton	6 ft 11 in (2.11 m)	235 lb (107 kg)		UCLA
C	33	Jerome Whitehead	6 ft 10 in (2.08 m)	220 lb (100 kg)		Marquette
F	4	Al Wood	6 ft 6 in (1.98 m)	193 lb (88 kg)		North Carolina

Coaches
Head coach
- Paul Silas

Legend
- (DP) Unsigned draft pick
- (FA) Free agent
- (S) Suspended
- Injured

=== Roster notes ===
- Forward Gus Gerard, who had played for the Buffalo Braves back in the 1976-77 NBA season, would have made his second tour of duty with the franchise, but was cut before the season began.

== Regular season ==
=== Season standings ===
Pacific Division	W	L	PCT	GB	Home	Road	Div
y-Los Angeles Lakers	58	24	.707	–	33–8	25–16	21–9
x-Phoenix Suns	53	29	.646	5	32–9	21–20	21–9
x-Seattle SuperSonics	48	34	.585	10	29–12	19–22	14–16
x-Portland Trail Blazers	46	36	.561	12	31–10	15–26	16–14
Golden State Warriors	30	52	.366	28	21–20	9–32	11–19
San Diego Clippers	25	57	.305	33	18–23	7–34	7–23

#	Western Conference				
#	Team	W	L	PCT	GB
1	c-Los Angeles Lakers	58	24	.707	–
2	y-San Antonio Spurs	53	29	.646	5
3	x-Phoenix Suns	53	29	.646	5
4	x-Seattle SuperSonics	48	34	.585	10
5	x-Portland Trail Blazers	46	36	.561	12
6	x-Denver Nuggets	45	37	.549	13
7	Kansas City Kings	45	37	.549	13
8	Dallas Mavericks	38	44	.463	20
9	Utah Jazz	30	52	.366	28
9	Golden State Warriors	30	52	.366	28
11	San Diego Clippers	25	57	.305	33
12	Houston Rockets	14	68	.171	44

Notes

- z, y – division champions
- x – clinched playoff spot

== Player statistics ==
Legend
GP	Games played	GS	Games started	MPG	Minutes per game
FG%	Field-goal percentage	3P%	3-point field-goal percentage	FT%	Free-throw percentage
RPG	Rebounds per game	APG	Assists per game	SPG	Steals per game
BPG	Blocks per game	PPG	Points per game

Player	GP	GS	MPG	FG%	3FG%	FT%	RPG	APG	SPG	BPG	PPG
Richard Anderson	78	5	16.3	.404	.368	.696	3.5	1.5	0.7	0.3	5.2
Jim Brogan	58	0	8.0	.427	.231	.791	1.1	1.1	0.4	0.2	3.8
Michael Brooks	82	26	30.0	.484	.333	.697	6.4	3.2	1.4	0.5	12.2
Tom Chambers	79	79	33.7	.472	.000	.723	6.6	2.4	1.0	0.7	17.6
Joe Cooper	13	4	21.2	.525		.550	5.5	1.2	0.6	1.5	5.6
Terry Cummings	70	69	36.2	.523	.000	.709	10.6	2.5	1.8	0.9	23.7
John Douglas	3	1	4.0	.167	.500	1.000	0.3	0.3	0.0	0.0	1.7
Bob Gross	27	3	13.8	.427	.333	.632	2.4	1.3	0.8	0.3	3.1
Craig Hodges	76	48	26.6	.452	.222	.723	1.6	3.6	1.1	0.1	9.9
Lionel Hollins	56	54	32.9	.437	.143	.721	2.3	6.7	2.0	0.3	13.5
Hutch Jones	9	0	9.4	.459		1.000	1.9	0.4	0.3	0.0	4.4
Lowes Moore	37	3	17.4	.426	.261	.750	1.5	2.0	0.6	0.0	5.7
Swen Nater	7	0	7.3	.300		1.000	1.9	0.1	0.1	0.0	2.3
Randy Smith	65	16	19.4	.489	.188	.863	1.4	3.0	0.8	0.0	9.1
Robert Smith	5	0	8.6	.154	.000	.875	0.6	1.2	0.8	0.0	2.2
Bill Walton	33	32	33.3	.528		.556	9.8	3.6	1.0	3.6	14.1
Jerome Whitehead	46	23	19.7	.536		.828	5.7	0.9	0.5	0.3	8.7
Al Wood	76	47	24.0	.464	.300	.770	3.1	1.8	0.7	0.5	10.9

== Awards and records ==
=== Awards ===
- Forward Terry Cummings won the NBA Rookie of the Year Award.

== Transactions ==
The Clippers were involved in the following transactions during the 1982–83 season.

=== Trades ===
June 28, 1982
To San Diego Clippers

- 1982 second-round draft choice (32nd pick)
To Houston Rockets

- Joe Bryant and 1982 second-round draft choice (42nd pick)
October 15, 1982
To San Diego Clippers

- Robert Smith
To Milwaukee Bucks

- 1983 sixth-round draft pick
October 27, 1982
To San Diego Clippers

- Lionel Hollins
To Philadelphia 76ers

- 1982 second-round & 1983 fourth-round draft picks

=== Free agents ===
==== Additions ====
Player	Signed	Former team
Ray Blume	10/8/82	Chicago Bulls
Randy Smith	10/28/82	New York Knicks
Hutch Jones	11/17/82	Los Angeles Lakers
Lowes Moore	1/29/83	Billings Volcanos
Bob Gross	2/14/83	Portland Trail Blazers
Joe Cooper	3/21/83	Lancaster Lightning

==== Subtractions ====
Player	Left	New team
Jim Smith	10/27/82	Detroit Pistons
Eddie Hughes	10/27/82	Wyoming Wildcatters
John Douglas	12/20/82	Montana Golden Nuggets
Robert Smith	11/17/82	San Antonio Spurs
Hutch Jones	12/20/82	Albuquerque Silvers
Randy Smith	3/15/83	Atlanta Hawks
