= 1982–83 Utah Jazz season =

NBA professional basketball team season

- Head coach: Frank Layden
- General manager: Frank Layden
- Owner: Sam Battistone
- Arena: Salt Palace

Results
- Record: 30–52 (.366)
- Place: Division: 5th (Midwest); Conference: 9th (Western)
- Playoff finish: Did not qualify
- Stats at Basketball Reference

Local media
- Television: KSL-TV
- Radio: KSL

The 1982–83 Utah Jazz season was the team's ninth in the NBA. They began the season hoping to improve upon their 25–57 output from the previous season. They bested it by five wins, finishing 30–52, but failed to qualify for the playoffs for the ninth straight season.

The Jazz drafted Dominique Wilkins with the 3rd overall pick in the 1982 NBA draft, but was traded to the Atlanta Hawks after refusing to play for the Jazz. Wilkins would go on to have a Hall of Fame career. This was the last season the Jazz missed the playoffs until 2004

== Draft picks ==
Round	Pick	Player	Position	Nationality	College
1	3	Dominique Wilkins	SF	United States	Georgia
3	49	Steve Trumbo	C	United States	Brigham Young
3	55	Jerry Eaves		United States	Louisville
4	72	Mark Eaton	C	United States	UCLA
5	95	Mike McKay		United States	Connecticut
6	118	Alvin Jackson		United States	Southern
7	141	Thad Gardner		United States	Michigan
8	164	Rick Campbell		United States	Middle Tennessee State
9	187	Riley Clarida		United States	Long Island
10	208	Michael Edwards		United States	New Orleans

== Roster ==
Utah Jazz roster
Players

Pos.	No.	Player	Height	Weight	DOB	From
SF	4	Adrian Dantley	6 ft 5 in (1.96 m)	208 lb (94 kg)	1955-02-28	Notre Dame
SF	22	John Drew	6 ft 6 in (1.98 m)	205 lb (93 kg)		Gardner–Webb
C	53	Mark Eaton	7 ft 4 in (2.24 m)	275 lb (125 kg)		UCLA
G	31	Jerry Eaves	6 ft 4 in (1.93 m)	180 lb (82 kg)		Louisville
PG	14	Rickey Green	6 ft 0 in (1.83 m)	170 lb (77 kg)		Michigan
G	35	Darrell Griffith	6 ft 4 in (1.93 m)	190 lb (86 kg)		Louisville
C	44	Rich Kelley	7 ft 0 in (2.13 m)	235 lb (107 kg)		Stanford
G	18	Kenny Natt	6 ft 3 in (1.91 m)	185 lb (84 kg)		Louisiana–Monroe
F	50	Ben Poquette	6 ft 9 in (2.06 m)	235 lb (107 kg)		Central Michigan
C	45	Jeff Wilkins	6 ft 11 in (2.11 m)	230 lb (104 kg)		Illinois State
G	5	Freeman Williams	6 ft 4 in (1.93 m)	185 lb (84 kg)		Portland State

Coaches
Head coach
- (United States) Frank Layden
Assistant(s)
- Phil Johnson
- Scott Layden

Legend
- (DP) Unsigned draft pick
- (FA) Free agent
- (S) Suspended
- Injured

== Regular season ==
=== Season standings ===
Midwest Division	W	L	PCT	GB	Home	Road	Div
y-San Antonio Spurs	53	29	.646	–	31–10	22–19	21–9
x-Denver Nuggets	45	37	.549	8	29–12	16–25	17–13
Kansas City Kings	45	37	.549	8	30–11	15–26	18–12
Dallas Mavericks	38	44	.463	15	23–18	15–26	15–15
Utah Jazz	30	52	.366	23	21–20	9–32	15–15
Houston Rockets	14	68	.171	39	9–32	5–36	4–26

#	Western Conference				
#	Team	W	L	PCT	GB
1	c-Los Angeles Lakers	58	24	.707	–
2	y-San Antonio Spurs	53	29	.646	5
3	x-Phoenix Suns	53	29	.646	5
4	x-Seattle SuperSonics	48	34	.585	10
5	x-Portland Trail Blazers	46	36	.561	12
6	x-Denver Nuggets	45	37	.549	13
7	Kansas City Kings	45	37	.549	13
8	Dallas Mavericks	38	44	.463	20
9	Utah Jazz	30	52	.366	28
9	Golden State Warriors	30	52	.366	28
11	San Diego Clippers	25	57	.305	33
12	Houston Rockets	14	68	.171	44

z - clinched division title
y - clinched division title
x - clinched playoff spot
