= 1982–83 Houston Rockets season =

- Head coach: Del Harris
- General manager: Ray Patterson
- Owner: Charlie Thomas
- Arena: The Summit

Results
- Record: 14–68 (.171)
- Place: Division: 6th (Midwest); Conference: 12th (Western)
- Playoff finish: Did not qualify
- Stats at Basketball Reference

Local media
- Television: KHTV
- Radio: KTRH

The 1982–83 Houston Rockets season was the Rockets' 16th season in the NBA and 12th season in the city of Houston.

== Draft picks ==
Round	Pick	Player	Position	Nationality	College/Club team
1	16	Terry Teagle	SG	United States	Baylor
2	42	Jeff Taylor	PG	United States	Texas Tech
3	63	Chuck Nevitt	C	United States	NC State
4	85	Andre Gaddy		United States	George Mason
5	107	Jeff Schneider		United States	Virginia Tech
6	132	Don Wilson		United States	Northeast Louisiana
7	154	Mike Helms	G	United States	Wake Forest
8	176	Dan Callandrillo		United States	Seton Hall

== Roster ==
Houston Rockets roster
Players

Pos.	No.	Player	Height	Weight	DOB	From
C	44	Elvin Hayes	6 ft 9 in (2.06 m)	235 lb (107 kg)		Houston
G	6	Tom Henderson	6 ft 3 in (1.91 m)	190 lb (86 kg)		Hawaiʻi
G	30	Allen Leavell	6 ft 1 in (1.85 m)	170 lb (77 kg)		Oklahoma City
G	23	Calvin Murphy	5 ft 9 in (1.75 m)	165 lb (75 kg)		Niagara
C	42	Chuck Nevitt	7 ft 5 in (2.26 m)	217 lb (98 kg)		NC State
F	50	Robert Reid	6 ft 8 in (2.03 m)	205 lb (93 kg)		Saint Mary's
G/F	20	Terry Teagle	6 ft 5 in (1.96 m)	195 lb (88 kg)		Baylor
F	42	Wally Walker	6 ft 7 in (2.01 m)	190 lb (86 kg)		Virginia

Coaches
Head coach
- Del Harris

Legend
- (DP) Unsigned draft pick
- (FA) Free agent
- (S) Suspended
- Injured

== Regular season ==
=== Season standings ===
Midwest Division	W	L	PCT	GB	Home	Road	Div
y-San Antonio Spurs	53	29	.646	–	31–10	22–19	21–9
x-Denver Nuggets	45	37	.549	8	29–12	16–25	17–13
Kansas City Kings	45	37	.549	8	30–11	15–26	18–12
Dallas Mavericks	38	44	.463	15	23–18	15–26	15–15
Utah Jazz	30	52	.366	23	21–20	9–32	15–15
Houston Rockets	14	68	.171	39	9–32	5–36	4–26

#	Western Conference				
#	Team	W	L	PCT	GB
1	c-Los Angeles Lakers	58	24	.707	–
2	y-San Antonio Spurs	53	29	.646	5
3	x-Phoenix Suns	53	29	.646	5
4	x-Seattle SuperSonics	48	34	.585	10
5	x-Portland Trail Blazers	46	36	.561	12
6	x-Denver Nuggets	45	37	.549	13
7	Kansas City Kings	45	37	.549	13
8	Dallas Mavericks	38	44	.463	20
9	Utah Jazz	30	52	.366	28
9	Golden State Warriors	30	52	.366	28
11	San Diego Clippers	25	57	.305	33
12	Houston Rockets	14	68	.171	44

z – clinched division title
y – clinched division title
x – clinched playoff spot

== See also ==
- 1982–83 NBA season
