= 1982–83 Seattle SuperSonics season =

NBA professional basketball team season

- Head coach: Lenny Wilkens
- General manager: Zollie Volchok
- Owner: Sam Schulman
- Arena: Kingdome

Results
- Record: 48–34 (.585)
- Place: Division: 3rd (Pacific); Conference: 4th (Western)
- Playoff finish: First round (lost to Trail Blazers 0–2)
- Stats at Basketball Reference

Local media
- Television: KIRO-TV
- Radio: KING

The 1982–83 NBA season was the SuperSonics' 16th season in the NBA. They started off the season with twelve straight wins but went 36-34 the rest of the way.

In the playoffs, the SuperSonics were swept by the Portland Trail Blazers in two games in the First Round.

== Offseason ==
=== Draft ===
Round	Pick	Player	Position	Nationality	College
3	65	John Greig	SF	United States	Oregon
4	88	Ken Owens	G	United States	Idaho
5	111	Rod Camp	C	United States	Southern Illinois
6	134	Bobby Potts	F	United States	Charlotte
7	157	Allen Rayhorn	C	United States	Northern Illinois
8	180	Steve Burks	G	United States	Washington

== Roster ==
1982–83 Seattle SuperSonics roster
Players

Pos.	No.	Player	Height	Weight	DOB	From
PG	32	Fred Brown	6 ft 3 in (1.91 m)	182 lb (83 kg)	1948-08-07	Iowa
C	40	James Donaldson	7 ft 2 in (2.18 m)	275 lb (125 kg)	1957-08-16	Washington State
PF	10	Steve Hawes	6 ft 9 in (2.06 m)	220 lb (100 kg)	1950-05-26	Washington
SF	3	Greg Kelser	6 ft 7 in (2.01 m)	205 lb (93 kg)	1957-09-17	Michigan State
SG	30	Mark Radford	6 ft 4 in (1.93 m)	190 lb (86 kg)	1959-07-05	Oregon State
PF	8	Lonnie Shelton	6 ft 8 in (2.03 m)	240 lb (109 kg)	1955-10-19	Oregon State
C	43	Jack Sikma	6 ft 11 in (2.11 m)	230 lb (104 kg)	1955-11-14	Illinois Wesleyan
SG	20	Phil Smith	6 ft 4 in (1.93 m)	185 lb (84 kg)	1952-04-22	San Francisco
SG	44	David Thompson	6 ft 4 in (1.93 m)	195 lb (88 kg)	1954-07-13	NC State
PF	33	Ray Tolbert	6 ft 9 in (2.06 m)	225 lb (102 kg)	1958-09-10	Indiana
SF	23	Danny Vranes	6 ft 7 in (2.01 m)	210 lb (95 kg)	1958-10-29	Utah
PG	1	Gus Williams	6 ft 2 in (1.88 m)	175 lb (79 kg)	1953-10-10	USC

Coaches
Head coach
- Lenny Wilkens
Assistant(s)
- Les Habegger

Legend
- (DP) Unsigned draft pick
- (FA) Free agent
- (S) Suspended
- Injured

Roster
Updated: February 13, 1983

== Standings ==
Pacific Division	W	L	PCT	GB	Home	Road	Div
y-Los Angeles Lakers	58	24	.707	–	33–8	25–16	21–9
x-Phoenix Suns	53	29	.646	5	32–9	21–20	21–9
x-Seattle SuperSonics	48	34	.585	10	29–12	19–22	14–16
x-Portland Trail Blazers	46	36	.561	12	31–10	15–26	16–14
Golden State Warriors	30	52	.366	28	21–20	9–32	11–19
San Diego Clippers	25	57	.305	33	18–23	7–34	7–23

#	Western Conference				
#	Team	W	L	PCT	GB
1	c-Los Angeles Lakers	58	24	.707	–
2	y-San Antonio Spurs	53	29	.646	5
3	x-Phoenix Suns	53	29	.646	5
4	x-Seattle SuperSonics	48	34	.585	10
5	x-Portland Trail Blazers	46	36	.561	12
6	x-Denver Nuggets	45	37	.549	13
7	Kansas City Kings	45	37	.549	13
8	Dallas Mavericks	38	44	.463	20
9	Utah Jazz	30	52	.366	28
9	Golden State Warriors	30	52	.366	28
11	San Diego Clippers	25	57	.305	33
12	Houston Rockets	14	68	.171	44

== Game log ==
=== Regular season ===
Game	Date	Opponent	Score	High Points	High Rebounds	High Assists	Record	Attendance
1	October 29	Houston	W 128–95	David Thompson (21)	Danny Vranes (13)	Gus Williams (11)	Kingdome; 21,885	1–0
2	October 31	@ San Diego	W 127–109	David Thompson (25)	Jack Sikma (10)	Gus Williams (8)	San Diego Sports Arena; 3,507	2–0
3	November 2	@ Utah	W 120–92	Jack Sikma (24)	Jack Sikma (16)	David Thompson (5)	Salt Palace; 7,378	3–0
4	November 3	San Antonio	W 109–107	David Thompson (21)	Jack Sikma (17)	Gus Williams (6)	Kingdome; 9,808	4–0
5	November 5	New York	W 112–103	David Thompson (30)	Jack Sikma, Lonnie Shelton (8)	Gus Williams (7)	Kingdome; 14,665	5–0
6	November 7	@ Milwaukee	W 102–90	Fred Brown, Lonnie Shelton (20)	Jack Sikma (11)	Fred Brown (6)	MECCA Arena; 10,975	6–0
7	November 9	@ Chicago	W 112–111	Jack Sikma (21)	Jack Sikma (9)	David Thompson, Mark Radford (7)	Chicago Stadium; 9,122	7–0
8	November 10	@ Dallas	W 94–91	Gus Williams (24)	Jack Sikma, Danny Vranes (9)	Gus Williams (12)	Reunion Arena; 9,813	8–0
9	November 13	@ San Antonio	W 107–98	David Thompson (32)	Jack Sikma (12)	Gus Williams (9)	HemisFair Arena; 14,814	9–0
10	November 14	@ Houston	W 102–99	Gus Williams (20)	Jack Sikma (14)	Jack Sikma (5)	The Summit; 6,576	10–0
11	November 17	Atlanta	W 119–97	David Thompson (24)	Lonnie Shelton (9)	Lonnie Shelton (8)	Kingdome; 11,169	11–0
12	November 19	Cleveland	W 101–94	David Thompson, Jack Sikma (17)	Jack Sikma (8)	Gus Williams (9)	Kingdome; 14,190	12–0
13	November 21	New Jersey	L 91–111	Gus Williams (21)	James Donaldson (10)	Fred Brown (3)	Kingdome; 13,353	12–1
14	November 24	Los Angeles	L 93–111	Jack Sikma, Lonnie Shelton (15)	Jack Sikma (13)	Gus Williams (8)	Kingdome; 26,320	12–2
15	November 26	Denver	W 127–106	Gus Williams (20)	Jack Sikma (13)	Phil Smith (10)	Kingdome	13–2
16	November 27	@ Golden State	W 133–118	Gus Williams (36)	Jack Sikma (15)	Jack Sikma, Gus Williams (7)	Oakland–Alameda County Coliseum Arena; 12,968	14–2
17	December 1	San Diego	W 131–110				Not announced	15–2
18	December 5	@ Kansas City	L 103–106				8,180	15–3
19	December 7	@ Houston	W 107–88				7,049	16–3
20	December 8	@ Dallas	L 94–110				10,063	16–4
21	December 10	Golden State	L 100–101				13,711	16–5
22	December 14	Phoenix	L 109–114 (OT)				12,432	16–6
23	December 16	Dallas	W 103–93				9,116	17–6
24	December 17	Kansas City	W 93–90				11,263	18–6
25	December 18	@ San Diego	W 121–107				3,594	19–6
26	December 21	Portland	W 99–94				12,976	20–6
27	December 23	Golden State	W 120–95				10,791	21–6
28	December 25	@ Portland	L 88–95				12,666	21–7
29	December 26	Phoenix	W 88–87				14,412	22–7
30	December 29	Utah	W 109–92				14,223	23–7
31	December 30	@ Los Angeles	L 117–137				17,505	23–8
32	January 2	@ Phoenix	L 99–116				11,318	23–9
33	January 5	Indiana	L 104–108				9,203	23–10
34	January 8	@ Golden State	L 104–110				12,269	23–11
35	January 9	@ Portland	L 101–110				12,666	23–12
36	January 11	Denver	L 119–131				Not announced	23–13
37	January 13	@ Phoenix	L 99–102				13,536	23–14
38	January 14	Portland	L 99–102				14,482	23–15
39	January 16	Kansas City	W 111–96				14,253	24–15
40	January 19	@ Atlanta	L 111–116				5,795	24–16
41	January 21	@ Philadelphia	L 117–130				18,482	24–17
42	January 23	@ New Jersey	L 102–105				13,276	24–18
43	January 26	@ Detroit	W 118–109				25–18	10,184
44	January 27	@ Washington	L 86–99				7,261	25–19
45	January 29	@ Cleveland	L 88–89				3,650	25–20
46	February 2	Milwaukee	W 117–114				10,158	26–20
47	February 4	San Antonio	W 115–103				13,082	27–20
48	February 6	Philadelphia	L 96–97				22,217	27–21
49	February 8	San Diego	L 118–121				19,726	27–22
50	February 9	@ Denver	L 125–134				12,847	27–23
51	February 10	@ Utah	W 105–99				8,939	28–23
52	February 16	Boston	L 100–108				17,870	28–24
53	February 18	Washington	W 115–112				12,661	29–24
54	February 20	Golden State	W 116–112				15,006	30–24
55	February 22	San Diego	W 117–101				19,732	31–24
56	February 24	@ Denver	L 129–138				15,748	31–25
57	February 25	Phoenix	L 101–106				15,688	31–26
58	February 27	Utah	W 101–98				20,167	32–26
59	March 1	@ San Antonio	L 104–119				7,988	32–27
60	March 2	@ Dallas	L 105–108				11,194	32–28
61	March 5	@ Houston	W 126–103				7,183	33–28
62	March 8	@ New York	L 98–107				8,743	33–29
63	March 9	@ Boston	W 112–106				15,320	34–29
64	March 11	@ Indiana	W 127–121				4,176	35–29
65	March 13	@ Kansas City	W 120–115 (OT)				7,754	36–29
66	March 16	Kansas City	W 110–102				10,981	37–29
67	March 18	Denver	W 147–117				14,268	38–29
68	March 20	Chicago	W 128–116				11,139	39–29
69	March 22	@ Los Angeles	L 108–123				17,505	39–30
70	March 23	San Antonio	W 137–117				14,203	40–30
71	March 25	Houston	L 104–106				11,884	40–31
72	March 27	@ Utah	W 122–108				8,923	41–31
73	March 30	Detroit	W 135–124				10,069	42–31
74	April 1	Dallas	W 101–95				12,782	43–31
75	April 4	Los Angeles	W 121–111				18,045	44–31
76	April 5	@ San Diego	W 115–109 (2OT)				4,228	45–31
77	April 7	San Diego	W 102–96				9,601	46–31
78	April 10	@ Portland	W 102–93				12,666	47–31
79	April 12	Portland	W 106–101				14,361	48–31
80	April 13	@ Phoenix	L 96–109				10,882	48–32
81	April 15	@ Los Angeles	L 99–100				17,505	48–33
82	April 16	@ Golden State	L 122–133				7,713	48–34

=== Playoffs ===
1983 playoff game log
First round: 0–2 (home: 0–1; road: 0–1)

Game	Date	Team	Score	High points	High rebounds	High assists	Location Attendance	Series
1	April 20	Portland	L 97–108	Gus Williams (34)	Jack Sikma (15)	Williams, Sikma (7)	Kingdome; 9,211	0–1
2	April 22	@ Portland	L 96–105	Gus Williams (31)	Danny Vranes (18)	Jack Sikma (4)	Memorial Coliseum; 12,666	0–2

1983 schedule

== Player statistics ==
Legend
GP	Games played	RPG	Rebounds per game
GS	Games started	APG	Assists per game
MPG	Minutes per game	PPG	Points per game

Player	GP	GS	MPG	RPG	APG	PPG
Fred Brown	80	1	17.9	1.2	3.0	10.2
James Donaldson	82	11	21.8	6.1	1.2	8.9
John Greig	9	0	2.9	0.7	0.0	2.1
Steve Hawes	31	1	17.9	4.3	1.2	5.5
Greg Kelser	80	9	18.8	5.0	1.2	8.3
Mark Radford	54	2	8.1	0.9	1.9	3.7
Lonnie Shelton	82	79	31.4	6.0	2.9	12.4
Jack Sikma	75	71	34.2	11.4	3.1	18.2
Phil Smith	79	17	15.7	1.6	2.7	5.7
David Thompson	75	64	28.7	3.6	3.0	15.9
Ray Tolbert	45	2	15.8	3.4	0.7	5.0
Danny Vranes	82	73	25.0	5.2	1.5	6.9
Gus Williams	80	80	34.5	2.6	8.0	20.0

Playoffs
Player	GP	GS	MPG	RPG	APG	PPG
Fred Brown	2		15.0	1.5	2.5	3.0
James Donaldson	2		23.5	8.5	1.0	12.0
Steve Hawes	2		17.5	3.0	1.0	6.0
Greg Kelser	2		9.5	3.0	0.5	2.0
Lonnie Shelton	2		26.5	10.5	2.5	5.0
Jack Sikma	2		37.5	13.0	5.5	15.0
Phil Smith	2		9.5	1.5	0.5	3.0
David Thompson	2		32.5	0.0	3.5	12.0
Danny Vranes	2		28.0	9.5	0.5	6.0
Gus Williams	2		40.5	3.5	4.0	32.5

== Awards and records ==
Player	Award	Date awarded	Ref.
Zollie Volchok	NBA Executive of The Year	1982-83 NBA Season	

== Transactions ==
=== Free agents ===
==== Additions ====
Date	Player	Signed	Former team
June 16, 1982	David Thompson	Free agent	Denver Nuggets

==== Subtractions ====
Date	Player	Reason left	New team
?	John Greig	Waived	N/A
?	Mark Radford	Waived	N/A

=== Trades ===
February 13, 1983
To Seattle SuperSonics

Steve Hawes (from Atlanta)
To Atlanta Hawks

1984 2nd round pick (from Detroit)

1985 2nd round pick (from Detroit)

To Detroit Pistons

Ray Tolbert (from Seattle)
