= 1982–83 San Antonio Spurs season =

- Division champions
- Head coach: Stan Albeck
- General manager: Bob Bass
- Owner: Angelo Drossos
- Arena: HemisFair Arena

Results
- Record: 53–29 (.646)
- Place: Division: 1st (Midwest); Conference: 2nd (Western)
- Playoff finish: Conference finals (lost to Lakers 2–4)
- Stats at Basketball Reference

The 1982–83 San Antonio Spurs season was the Spurs' seventh season in the NBA and 16th season as a franchise. This season also saw the debut of their mascot The Coyote. Who first appeared on April 13, 1983.

== Draft picks ==
Round	Pick	Player	Position	Nationality	College
2	24	Oliver Robinson	SG	United States	Alabama-Birmingham
3	64	Willie Redden		United States	South Florida
4	87	Tony Grier		United States	South Florida
5	110	Clarence Swannegan		United States	Texas Tech
6	133	Jaime Pena		Mexico; United States	New Mexico State
7	156	Delonte Taylor		United States	North Texas State
8	179	Chris Faggi		United States	Memphis
9	201	Harry O'Brien		United States	St. Mary's
10	222	Keith White		United States	McMurry

== Roster ==
1982–83 San Antonio Spurs roster
Players

Pos.	No.	Player	Height	Weight	DOB	From
PF	20	Gene Banks	6 ft 7 in (2.01 m)	215 lb (98 kg)	1959-05-15	Duke
PG	10	Mike Dunleavy	6 ft 3 in (1.91 m)	180 lb (82 kg)	1954-03-21	South Carolina
G/F	44	George Gervin	6 ft 7 in (2.01 m)	180 lb (82 kg)	1952-04-27	Eastern Michigan
C	53	Artis Gilmore	7 ft 2 in (2.18 m)	240 lb (109 kg)	1949-09-21	Jacksonville
PF	30	Paul Griffin	6 ft 9 in (2.06 m)	205 lb (93 kg)	1954-01-20	Western Michigan
PF	42	Edgar Jones	6 ft 10 in (2.08 m)	225 lb (102 kg)	1956-06-17	Nevada
SF	34	Mike Mitchell	6 ft 7 in (2.01 m)	215 lb (98 kg)	1956-01-01	Auburn
PG	00	Johnny Moore	6 ft 1 in (1.85 m)	175 lb (79 kg)	1958-03-03	Texas
C	5	Billy Paultz	6 ft 11 in (2.11 m)	235 lb (107 kg)	1948-07-30	St. John's
SG	21	Roger Phegley	6 ft 6 in (1.98 m)	205 lb (93 kg)	1956-10-16	Bradley
SF	15	Ed Rains	6 ft 7 in (2.01 m)	190 lb (86 kg)	1956-12-24	South Alabama
SG	1	Oliver Robinson	6 ft 4 in (1.93 m)	180 lb (82 kg)	1960-03-13	UAB
SF	35	Mike Sanders	6 ft 6 in (1.98 m)	210 lb (95 kg)	1960-05-07	UCLA
PG	9	Robert Smith	5 ft 11 in (1.80 m)	165 lb (75 kg)	1955-03-10	UNLV

Coaches
Head coach
- Stan Albeck
Assistant(s)
- Morris McHone

Legend
- (DP) Unsigned draft pick
- (FA) Free agent
- (S) Suspended
- Injured

Roster
Updated: April 7, 1983

== Regular season ==
=== Season standings ===
Midwest Division	W	L	PCT	GB	Home	Road	Div
y-San Antonio Spurs	53	29	.646	–	31–10	22–19	21–9
x-Denver Nuggets	45	37	.549	8	29–12	16–25	17–13
Kansas City Kings	45	37	.549	8	30–11	15–26	18–12
Dallas Mavericks	38	44	.463	15	23–18	15–26	15–15
Utah Jazz	30	52	.366	23	21–20	9–32	15–15
Houston Rockets	14	68	.171	39	9–32	5–36	4–26

#	Western Conference				
#	Team	W	L	PCT	GB
1	c-Los Angeles Lakers	58	24	.707	–
2	y-San Antonio Spurs	53	29	.646	5
3	x-Phoenix Suns	53	29	.646	5
4	x-Seattle SuperSonics	48	34	.585	10
5	x-Portland Trail Blazers	46	36	.561	12
6	x-Denver Nuggets	45	37	.549	13
7	Kansas City Kings	45	37	.549	13
8	Dallas Mavericks	38	44	.463	20
9	Utah Jazz	30	52	.366	28
9	Golden State Warriors	30	52	.366	28
11	San Diego Clippers	25	57	.305	33
12	Houston Rockets	14	68	.171	44

z - clinched division title
y - clinched division title
x - clinched playoff spot

== Game log ==
=== Regular season ===
1982–83 game log
Total: 53–29 (home: 31–10; road: 22–19)
October: 2–0 (home: 1–0; road: 1–0)

Game	Date	Team	Score	High points	High rebounds	High assists	Location Attendance	Record
1	October 29	@ Utah	W 120–114				Salt Palace Acord Arena	1–0
2	October 30	Portland	W 112–107				HemisFair Arena	2–0

November: 10–6 (home: 6–2; road: 4–4)

Game	Date	Team	Score	High points	High rebounds	High assists	Location Attendance	Record
3	November 3	@ Seattle	L 107–109				Kingdome	2–1
4	November 4	@ Portland	W 108–107 (OT)				Memorial Coliseum	3–1
5	November 5	@ Golden State	W 105–104				Oakland–Alameda County Coliseum Arena	4–1
6	November 7	Phoenix	W 101–100				HemisFair Arena	5–1
7	November 9	Utah	W 120–114				HemisFair Arena	6–1
8	November 11	@ San Diego	L 105–109				San Diego Sports Arena	5–3
9	November 13	Seattle	L 98–107				HemisFair Arena	6–3
10	November 16	Kansas City	L 102–105				HemisFair Arena	6–4
11	November 17	@ Washington	W 114–112				Capital Centre	7–4
12	November 19	@ Boston	L 111–119				Boston Garden	7–5
13	November 20	Golden State	W 134–112				HemisFair Arena	8–5
14	November 23	Denver	W 136–126				HemisFair Arena	9–5
15	November 24	@ Denver	L 123–129				McNichols Sports Arena	9–6
16	November 26	Chicago	W 122–120				HemisFair Arena	10–6
17	November 27	@ Dallas	W 107–106				Reunion Arena	11–6
18	November 30	Los Angeles	W 117–114				HemisFair Arena	12–6

December: 9–6 (home: 4–3; road: 5–3)

Game	Date	Team	Score	High points	High rebounds	High assists	Location Attendance	Record
19	December 1	@ Detroit	L 97–105				Pontiac Silverdome	12–7
20	December 3	Houston	W 88–78				HemisFair Arena	13–7
21	December 4	@ Houston	L 93–94				The Summit	13–8
22	December 7	Dallas	W 106–92				HemisFair Arena	14–8
23	December 8	@ Kansas City	W 102–101 (OT)				Kemper Arena	15–8
24	December 10	@ New Jersey	W 114–102				Brendan Byrne Arena	16–8
25	December 11	Kansas City	L 110–122				HemisFair Arena	16–9
26	December 14	@ Houston	W 102–93				The Summit	17–9
27	December 16	@ Denver	W 120–108				McNichols Sports Arena	18–9
28	December 17	Utah	W 110–103				HemisFair Arena	19–9
29	December 19	@ Milwaukee	L 98–113				MECCA Arena	19–10
30	December 21	Phoenix	L 113–114				HemisFair Arena	19–11
31	December 26	Philadelphia	L 122–124				HemisFair Arena	19–12
32	December 29	San Diego	W 124–115				HemisFair Arena	20–12
33	December 30	@ Chicago	W 105–102				Chicago Stadium	21–12

January: 9–6 (home: 5–2; road: 4–4)

Game	Date	Team	Score	High points	High rebounds	High assists	Location Attendance	Record
34	January 2	@ Cleveland	W 103–95				Richfield Coliseum	22–12
35	January 4	@ Atlanta	W 104–95				The Omni	23–12
36	January 5	@ Dallas	L 131–136				Reunion Arena	23–13
37	January 7	Boston	L 113–116				HemisFair Arena	23–14
38	January 11	Dallas	W 109–101				HemisFair Arena	24–14
39	January 12	@ Kansas City	L 113–118				Kemper Arena	24–15
40	January 14	Houston	W 96–92				HemisFair Arena	25–15
41	January 15	Washington	W 117–96				HemisFair Arena	26–15
42	January 18	Denver	W 143–124				HemisFair Arena	27–15
43	January 19	@ Phoenix	L 113–118				Arizona Veterans Memorial Coliseum	27–16
44	January 21	@ Los Angeles	L 110–119				The Forum	27–17
45	January 23	Portland	L 107–108				HemisFair Arena	27–18
46	January 25	@ Utah	W 116–106				Salt Palace Acord Arena	28–18
47	January 27	@ Indiana	W 143–138				Market Square Arena	29–18
48	January 29	New Jersey	W 120–109				HemisFair Arena	30–18

February: 6–5 (home: 4–2; road: 2–3)

Game	Date	Team	Score	High points	High rebounds	High assists	Location Attendance	Record
49	February 2	New York	L 98–109				HemisFair Arena	30–19
50	February 4	@ Seattle	L 103–115				Kingdome	30–20
51	February 5	@ Golden State	L 102–106				Oakland–Alameda County Coliseum Arena	30–21
52	February 8	Detroit	W 147–143 (OT)				HemisFair Arena	31–21
53	February 10	Golden State	W 128–109				HemisFair Arena	32–21
54	February 15	@ Los Angeles	W 124–103				The Forum	33–21
55	February 16	@ Utah	L 101–112				Salt Palace Acord Arena	33–22
56	February 20	Atlanta	W 103–100				HemisFair Arena	34–22
57	February 23	Portland	W 124–114				HemisFair Arena	35–22
58	February 25	@ Kansas City	W 131–125				Kemper Arena	36–22
59	February 26	Milwaukee	L 104–107				HemisFair Arena	36–23

March: 10–4 (home: 7–0; road: 3–4)

Game	Date	Team	Score	High points	High rebounds	High assists	Location Attendance	Record
60	March 1	Seattle	W 119–104				HemisFair Arena	37–23
61	March 2	@ Phoenix	L 106–110				Arizona Veterans Memorial Coliseum	37–24
62	March 4	@ San Diego	W 107–99				San Diego Sports Arena	38–24
63	March 6	Cleveland	W 117–98				HemisFair Arena	39–24
64	March 8	@ Denver	L 118–129				McNichols Sports Arena	39–25
65	March 9	Phoenix	W 108–105				HemisFair Arena	40–25
66	March 12	Golden State	W 131–120				HemisFair Arena	41–25
67	March 15	San Diego	W 130–109				HemisFair Arena	42–25
68	March 17	@ San Diego	W 111–101				San Diego Sports Arena	43–25
69	March 19	Indiana	W 138–118				HemisFair Arena	44–25
70	March 22	@ Portland	L 102–119				Memorial Coliseum	44–26
71	March 23	@ Seattle	L 117–137				Kingdome	44–27
72	March 25	@ Los Angeles	W 132–120				The Forum	45–27
73	March 29	Denver	W 136–129				HemisFair Arena	46–27

April: 7–2 (home: 4–1; road: 3–1)

Game	Date	Team	Score	High points	High rebounds	High assists	Location Attendance	Record
74	April 1	Houston	W 124–99				HemisFair Arena	47–27
75	April 2	@ Houston	W 112–101				The Summit	48–27
76	April 5	Kansas City	W 130–113				HemisFair Arena	49–27
77	April 6	@ Philadelphia	W 112–109				The Spectrum	50–27
78	April 8	@ New York	L 100–102 (OT)				Madison Square Garden	50–28
79	April 9	Dallas	L 111–122				HemisFair Arena	50–29
80	April 13	Los Angeles	W 114–109				HemisFair Arena	51–29
81	April 15	Utah	W 121–118				HemisFair Arena	52–29
82	April 16	@ Dallas	W 132–120				Reunion Arena	53–29

1982–83 schedule

=== Playoffs ===
1983 playoff game log
Conference semifinals: 4–1 (home: 3–0; road: 1–1)

Game	Date	Team	Score	High points	High rebounds	High assists	Location Attendance	Series
1	April 26	Denver	W 152–133	George Gervin (42)	Gene Banks (11)	Johnny Moore (17)	HemisFair Arena; 10,116	1–0
2	April 27	Denver	W 126–109	George Gervin (30)	Artis Gilmore (12)	Johnny Moore (20)	HemisFair Arena; 10,690	2–0
3	April 29	@ Denver	W 127–126 (OT)	Johnny Moore (39)	Artis Gilmore (14)	Johnny Moore (12)	McNichols Sports Arena; 16,965	3–0
4	May 2	@ Denver	L 114–124	Johnny Moore (27)	Artis Gilmore (11)	Johnny Moore (9)	McNichols Sports Arena; 15,035	3–1
5	May 4	Denver	W 145–105	George Gervin (26)	Artis Gilmore (15)	Johnny Moore (13)	HemisFair Arena; 12,736	4–1

Conference finals: 2–4 (home: 0–3; road: 2–1)

Game	Date	Team	Score	High points	High rebounds	High assists	Location Attendance	Series
1	May 8	@ Los Angeles	L 107–119	Mike Mitchell (26)	George Gervin (9)	Johnny Moore (18)	The Forum; 15,063	0–1
2	May 10	@ Los Angeles	W 122–113	George Gervin (32)	Artis Gilmore (20)	Johnny Moore (15)	The Forum; 17,505	1–1
3	May 13	Los Angeles	L 100–113	Mike Mitchell (23)	Artis Gilmore (14)	Johnny Moore (9)	HemisFair Arena; 15,782	1–2
4	May 15	Los Angeles	L 121–129	Mike Mitchell (35)	Mike Mitchell (11)	Johnny Moore (17)	HemisFair Arena; 15,782	1–3
5	May 18	@ Los Angeles	W 117–112	Mike Mitchell (26)	Artis Gilmore (14)	Johnny Moore (17)	The Forum; 17,505	2–3
6	May 20	Los Angeles	L 100–101	George Gervin (25)	Artis Gilmore (18)	Johnny Moore (14)	HemisFair Arena; 15,782	2–4

1983 schedule

== Player statistics ==
=== Ragular season ===
Player	POS	GP	GS	MP	REB	AST	STL	BLK	PTS	MPG	RPG	APG	SPG	BPG	PPG
Artis Gilmore	C	82	82	2,797	984	126	40	192	1,479	34.1	12.0	1.5	.5	2.3	18.0
Gene Banks	PF	81	81	2,722	612	279	78	21	1,206	33.6	7.6	3.4	1.0	.3	14.9
Mike Mitchell	SF	80	79	2,803	537	98	57	52	1,591	35.0	6.7	1.2	.7	.7	19.9
Mike Dunleavy Sr.	PG	79	9	1,619	134	437	74	4	613	20.5	1.7	5.5	.9	.1	7.8
George Gervin	SG	78	78	2,830	357	264	88	67	2,043	36.3	4.6	3.4	1.1	.9	26.2
Johnny Moore	PG	77	73	2,552	277	753	194	32	941	33.1	3.6	9.8	2.5	.4	12.2
Roger Phegley	SG	62	4	599	84	60	30	8	286	9.7	1.4	1.0	.5	.1	4.6
Paul Griffin	PF	53	0	956	216	86	33	25	173	18.0	4.1	1.6	.6	.5	3.3
Bill Willoughby^{†}	SF	52	0	1,062	190	56	24	16	319	20.4	3.7	1.1	.5	.3	6.1
Oliver Robinson	SG	35	0	147	17	21	4	2	101	4.2	.5	.6	.1	.1	2.9
Ed Rains	SF	34	1	292	44	22	10	1	95	8.6	1.3	.6	.3	.0	2.8
Edgar Jones^{†}	PF	28	3	622	177	20	14	31	268	22.2	6.3	.7	.5	1.1	9.6
Mike Sanders	SF	26	0	393	94	19	18	6	183	15.1	3.6	.7	.7	.2	7.0
Geoff Crompton	C	14	0	148	48	7	3	5	31	10.6	3.4	.5	.2	.4	2.2
Coby Dietrick	C	8	0	34	8	6	1	0	2	4.3	1.0	.8	.1	.0	.3
Billy Paultz^{†}	C	7	0	125	33	4	5	6	25	17.9	4.7	.6	.7	.9	3.6
Jim Johnstone^{†}	C	7	0	54	16	1	1	1	7	7.7	2.3	.1	.1	.1	1.0
Robert Smith^{†}	PG	7	0	25	3	2	1	0	12	3.6	.4	.3	.1	.0	1.7

- ^{†} Denotes player spent time with another team in the season. Stats reflect time with the Spurs only.

=== Playoffs ===
Player	POS	GP	GS	MP	REB	AST	STL	BLK	PTS	MPG	RPG	APG	SPG	BPG	PPG
George Gervin	SG	11		437	74	37	12	4	277	39.7	6.7	3.4	1.1	.4	25.2
Mike Mitchell	SF	11		422	105	12	7	19	230	38.4	9.5	1.1	.6	1.7	20.9
Johnny Moore	PG	11		414	47	161	28	3	247	37.6	4.3	14.6	2.5	.3	22.5
Artis Gilmore	C	11		401	142	18	9	34	184	36.5	12.9	1.6	.8	3.1	16.7
Gene Banks	PF	11		398	76	50	11	1	175	36.2	6.9	4.5	1.0	.1	15.9
Edgar Jones	PF	11		193	53	17	6	14	75	17.5	4.8	1.5	.5	1.3	6.8
Mike Dunleavy Sr.	PG	11		174	13	49	9	1	61	15.8	1.2	4.5	.8	.1	5.5
Billy Paultz	C	11		133	32	11	4	2	30	12.1	2.9	1.0	.4	.2	2.7
Roger Phegley	SG	8		38	8	1	0	0	24	4.8	1.0	.1	.0	.0	3.0
Mike Sanders	SF	6		25	9	4	0	0	14	4.2	1.5	.7	.0	.0	2.3
Robert Smith	PG	6		19	5	6	1	0	10	3.2	.8	1.0	.2	.0	1.7
Ed Rains	SF	3		11	1	1	0	0	4	3.7	.3	.3	.0	.0	1.3

== Awards and records ==
- George Gervin, All-NBA Second Team

== See also ==
- 1982-83 NBA season
