= Kyle Macy =

American basketball player and coach (born 1957)

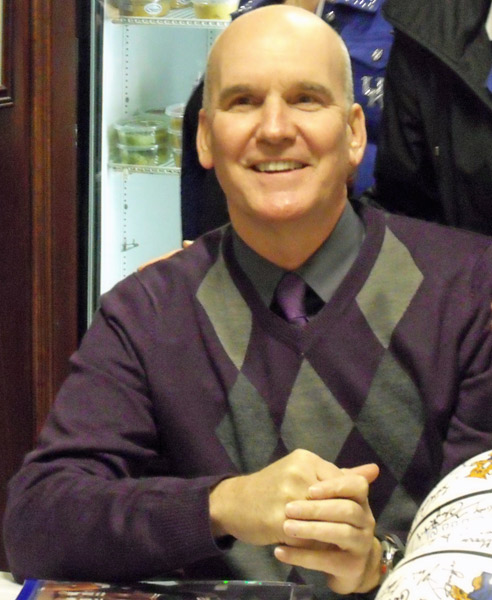
- Macy at an autograph signing in 2013

Personal information
- Born: April 9, 1957 (age 69) Fort Wayne, Indiana, U.S.
- Listed height: 6 ft 3 in (1.91 m)
- Listed weight: 175 lb (79 kg)

Career information
- High school: Peru (Peru, Indiana)
- College: Purdue (1975–1976); Kentucky (1977–1980)
- NBA draft: 1979: 1st round, 22nd overall pick
- Drafted by: Phoenix Suns
- Playing career: 1980–1990
- Position: Point guard
- Number: 4, 24, 44

Career history

Playing
- 1980–1985: Phoenix Suns
- 1985–1986: Chicago Bulls
- 1986–1987: Indiana Pacers
- 1988: Dietor Bologna
- 1988–1990: Benetton Treviso

Coaching
- 1997–2006: Morehead State
- 2016–2018: Transylvania (assistant)

Career highlights
- As player: NCAA champion (1978); Consensus first-team All-American (1980); Third-team All-American – NABC (1979); SEC Player of the Year (1980); SEC Male Athlete of the Year (1980); SEC tournament MVP (1979); 3× First-team All-SEC (1978, 1979, 1980); First-team Parade All-American (1975); Indiana Mr. Basketball (1975); As coach: OVC regular season champion (2003)

Career NBA statistics
- Points: 5,259 (9.5 ppg)
- Rebounds: 1,214 (2.2 rpg)
- Assists: 2,198 (4.0 apg)
- Stats at NBA.com
- Stats at Basketball Reference
Medals
Representing United States
Men's basketball
Pan American Games
Gold medal – first place	1979 San Juan	Team competition

Kyle Robert Macy (born April 9, 1957) is an American basketball commentator. He played college basketball for the Purdue Boilermakers and Kentucky Wildcats, and spent seven years in the NBA with the Phoenix Suns, Chicago Bulls and Indiana Pacers; he then spent three seasons in the Italian Lega Serie A. After his playing career, he has held various basketball-related positions, including coach, general manager, and broadcaster.

== College career ==
=== Purdue ===
The 1975 Indiana "Mr. Basketball" Award winner from Peru High School, where he played for his father, Bob; chose to attend Purdue University, coached by head coach, Fred Schaus. Macy averaged 13.8 points a game as a freshman, while leading the Boilermakers in free throws, shooting .859 percent from the line on the season. He started in 25 of 27 games, helping them to a 16–11 season record.

=== Kentucky ===
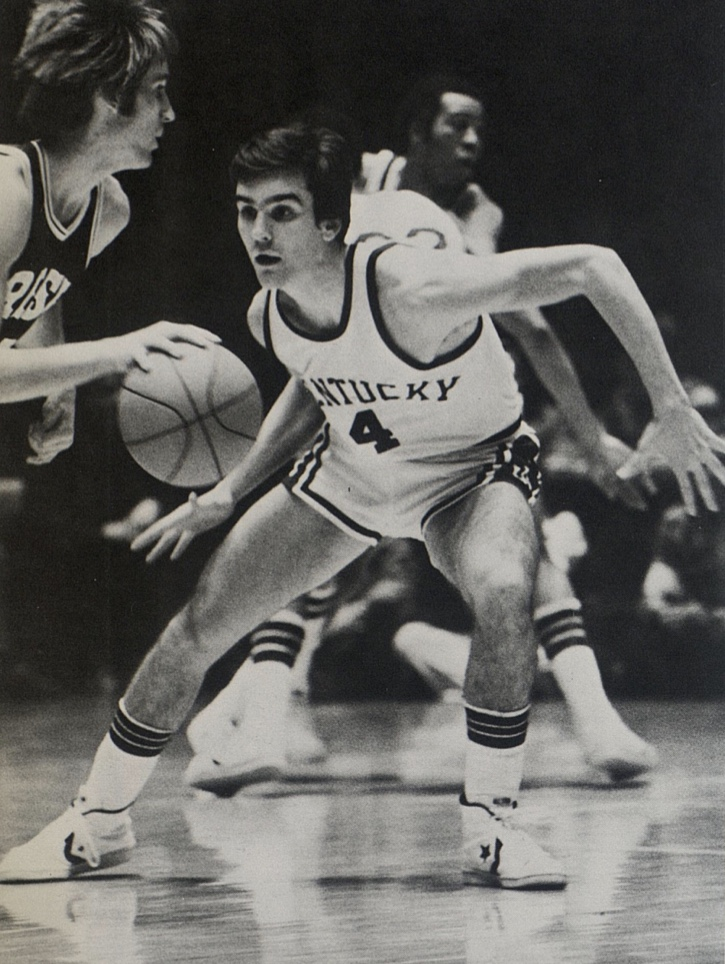
Macy in his first year at Kentucky.

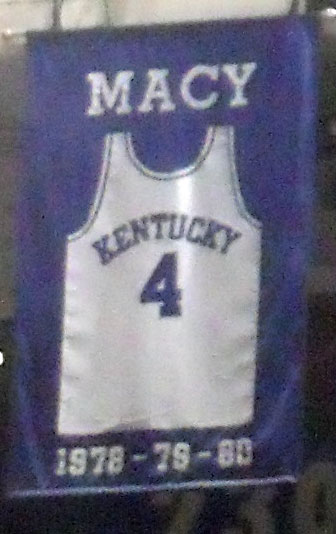
A jersey honoring Macy hangs in Rupp Arena

After playing his freshman year at Purdue, Macy transferred to the University of Kentucky in 1976. After sitting out the 1976–77 season as mandated by NCAA rules, he started playing at Kentucky in 1977. Macy had a very successful college career, as a three-time All-America and three-time All-SEC player. The 1978 team on which Macy was a starter won the 1978 NCAA National Championship. In his senior year of 1979–80, he became the first Kentucky player ever to be named consensus Southeastern Conference Player of the Year.

== Professional career ==
Macy was selected with the 22nd pick of the 1979 NBA draft by the Phoenix Suns, even though he had a year of college eligibility remaining. Macy played out his last year of college, and started playing for the Suns in 1980. Macy spent five years with the Suns, averaging 10.6 points and 4.0 assists per game. Macy spent one year each with the Chicago Bulls (1985–86) and the Indiana Pacers (1986–87) before retiring from the NBA. Then he played professionally in Italy for Dietor Bologna (1987–88) and Benetton Treviso (1988–90). Macy was also one of the original participants of the NBA All-Star Three Point Contest when it debuted in 1986.

Macy was an excellent free throw shooter throughout his career. During the 1981-82 NBA season he led the NBA in free throw percentage. He still holds the career free throw shooting percentage record at the University of Kentucky, and his .884 career percentage is second only to Steve Nash (.907) on the Phoenix Suns' career leaders list.

== Coaching career ==
Macy was head coach of the Morehead State University Eagles of the Ohio Valley Conference for nine years. In 2003, Macy coached the Eagles to 20 wins, its most in 19 years, and a share of the OVC regular season championship. However, the 2004–05 season was less successful, as Morehead failed to qualify for the OVC tournament. Following that season, Macy coached a group of Sports Reach collegiate all-stars that toured China and finished with a perfect 7–0 record against several Chinese professional teams. After a disastrous 4–23 season in 2005–06, Macy resigned as head coach on February 28, 2006.

Macy emphasized free throw shooting in his coaching, and the emphasis paid off, as his Morehead State teams were perennially among the Division I leaders in free throw shooting percentage.

Later in 2006, Macy accepted the head coaching position on the Lexington Christian Academy Eagles Men's tennis team. In his first season they had their first winning season since 2003. In November 2007, Macy was named general manager of the East Kentucky Miners, an expansion team of the Continental Basketball Association, based in Pikeville, Kentucky. Later, he served as the color commentator for University of Kentucky telecasts. In October 2016, Macy joined the staff of head coach Brian Lane at Transylvania University.

== Career playing statistics ==
Legend
GP	Games played	GS	Games started	MPG	Minutes per game
FG%	Field goal percentage	3P%	3-point field goal percentage	FT%	Free throw percentage
RPG	Rebounds per game	APG	Assists per game	SPG	Steals per game
BPG	Blocks per game	PPG	Points per game	**Bold**	Career high
*	Led the league

=== NBA ===
==== Regular season ====
Year	Team	GP	GS	MPG	FG%	3P%	FT%	RPG	APG	SPG	BPG	PPG
1980–81	Phoenix	**82**		17.9	.511	.235	.899	1.6	2.0	.9	**.1**	8.1
1981–82	Phoenix	**82**	72	**34.7**	.514	.390	.899*	**3.2**	4.7	**1.7**	**.1**	**14.2**
1982–83	Phoenix	**82**	9	22.4	**.517**	.303	.872	2.0	3.4	.8	**.1**	9.9
1983–84	Phoenix	**82***	45	29.3	.501	.329	.833	2.3	4.3	1.5	**.1**	10.1
1984–85	Phoenix	65	52	31.0	.485	.271	**.907***	2.8	**5.8**	1.3	.0	11.0
1985–86	Chicago	**82**	**79**	29.6	.483	**.411**	.811	2.2	5.4	1.0	**.1**	8.6
1986–87	Indiana	76	0	16.4	.481	.304	.829	1.5	2.6	.8	**.1**	4.9
Career		551	257	25.9	.501	.337	.873	2.2	4.0	1.1	.1	9.5

==== Playoffs ====
Year	Team	GP	GS	MPG	FG%	3P%	FT%	RPG	APG	SPG	BPG	PPG
1981	Phoenix	7		14.6	**.528**	**.500**	**1.000**	1.9	1.6	.7	.0	7.0
1982	Phoenix	7		34.7	.427	.364	.938	3.1	4.0	1.0	**.1**	**13.6**
1983	Phoenix	3		24.0	.429	.000	.714	2.7	3.0	.3	.0	11.7
1984	Phoenix	**17**		**36.5**	.490	.455	.750	**3.2**	**5.8**	1.3	**.1**	10.4
1985	Phoenix	**3**	**3**	28.3	.500	.250	.800	2.7	3.0	**2.0**	.0	10.3
1986	Chicago	**3**	**3**	29.0	.357	.250	**1.000**	1.3	3.3	.7	.0	4.0
1987	Indiana	4	0	12.3	.333	.000	.000	.8	1.3	.3	.0	1.0
Career		44	6	28.6	.466	.377	.830	2.5	3.9	1.0	.1	9.1

== Head coaching record ==
Record table
Season	Team	Overall	Conference	Standing	Postseason
Morehead State Eagles (Ohio Valley Conference) (1997–2006)
1997–98	Morehead State	3–23	2–16	10th	
1998–99	Morehead State	13–15	9–9	T–3rd	
1999–00	Morehead State	9–18	4–14	9th	
2000–01	Morehead State	12–16	6–10	7th	
2001–02	Morehead State	18–11	11–5	2nd	
2002–03	Morehead State	20–9	13–3	T–1st	
2003–04	Morehead State	16–13	10–6	3rd	
2004–05	Morehead State	11–16	5–11	9th	
2005–06	Morehead State	4–23	3–17	10th	
Morehead State:		106–144 (.424)	63–91 (.409)		
Total:		106–144 (.424)			
National champion Postseason invitational champion Conference regular season champion Conference regular season and conference tournament champion Division regular season champion Division regular season and conference tournament champion Conference tournament champion
