= 1982–83 Golden State Warriors season =

NBA professional basketball team season

- Head coach: Al Attles
- Arena: Oakland-Alameda County Coliseum Arena

Results
- Record: 30–52 (.366)
- Place: Division: 5th (Pacific); Conference: 10th (Western)
- Playoff finish: Did not qualify
- Stats at Basketball Reference

The 1982–83 Golden State Warriors season was the Warriors' 37th season in the NBA and 20th in the San Francisco Bay Area.

== Draft picks ==
Round	Pick	Player	Position	Nationality	College
1	14	Lester Conner	PG	United States	Oregon State
2	35	Derek Smith	SG/SF	United States	Louisville
2	38	Wayne Sappleton	PF	United States	Loyola (IL)
3	60	Chris Engler	C	United States	Wyoming
4	83	Ken Stancler		United States	Virginia Commonwealth
5	106	Albert Irving		United States	Alcorn State
6	129	David Vann		United States	St. Mary's (CA)
7	152	Matt Waldron		United States	Pacific
8	175	Mark King		United States	Florida Southern
9	198	Nick Morken		United States	Tennessee
10	219	Randy Whieldon		United States	California-Irvine

== Roster ==
Golden State Warriors roster
Players

Pos.	No.	Player	Height	Weight	DOB	From
G	17	Ron Brewer	6 ft 4 in (1.93 m)	180 lb (82 kg)		Arkansas
C	2	Joe Barry Carroll	7 ft 0 in (2.13 m)	225 lb (102 kg)		Purdue
G	32	Lester Conner	6 ft 4 in (1.93 m)	180 lb (82 kg)		Oregon State
C	55	Chris Engler	6 ft 11 in (2.11 m)	245 lb (111 kg)		Wyoming
G	21	Sleepy Floyd	6 ft 3 in (1.91 m)	170 lb (77 kg)		Georgetown
F	43	Mickey Johnson	6 ft 10 in (2.08 m)	190 lb (86 kg)		Aurora
G	32	Lewis Lloyd	6 ft 6 in (1.98 m)	205 lb (93 kg)		Drake
G	18	Lorenzo Romar	6 ft 1 in (1.85 m)	175 lb (79 kg)		Washington
G/F	45	Purvis Short	6 ft 7 in (2.01 m)	210 lb (95 kg)		Jackson State
G/F	41	Derek Smith	6 ft 6 in (1.98 m)	205 lb (93 kg)		Louisville
F	13	Larry Smith	6 ft 8 in (2.03 m)	215 lb (98 kg)		Alcorn State
F	33	Sam Williams	6 ft 8 in (2.03 m)	210 lb (95 kg)		Arizona State

Coaches
Head coach
- Al Attles (North Carolina A&T)
Assistant(s)
- Johnny Bach (Fordham)

Legend
- (DP) Unsigned draft pick
- (FA) Free agent
- (S) Suspended
- Injured

== Regular season ==
=== Season standings ===
Pacific Division	W	L	PCT	GB	Home	Road	Div
y-Los Angeles Lakers	58	24	.707	–	33–8	25–16	21–9
x-Phoenix Suns	53	29	.646	5	32–9	21–20	21–9
x-Seattle SuperSonics	48	34	.585	10	29–12	19–22	14–16
x-Portland Trail Blazers	46	36	.561	12	31–10	15–26	16–14
Golden State Warriors	30	52	.366	28	21–20	9–32	11–19
San Diego Clippers	25	57	.305	33	18–23	7–34	7–23

#	Western Conference				
#	Team	W	L	PCT	GB
1	c-Los Angeles Lakers	58	24	.707	–
2	y-San Antonio Spurs	53	29	.646	5
3	x-Phoenix Suns	53	29	.646	5
4	x-Seattle SuperSonics	48	34	.585	10
5	x-Portland Trail Blazers	46	36	.561	12
6	x-Denver Nuggets	45	37	.549	13
7	Kansas City Kings	45	37	.549	13
8	Dallas Mavericks	38	44	.463	20
9	Utah Jazz	30	52	.366	28
9	Golden State Warriors	30	52	.366	28
11	San Diego Clippers	25	57	.305	33
12	Houston Rockets	14	68	.171	44

z - clinched division title
y - clinched division title
x - clinched playoff spot

== See also ==
- 1982-83 NBA season
