= Hutch Jones =

American basketball player

Personal information
- Born: September 1, 1959 (age 67) Buffalo, New York
- Listed height: 6 ft 8 in (2.03 m)
- Listed weight: 190 lb (86 kg)

Career information
- High school: Bishop Turner (Buffalo, New York)
- College: Buffalo State (1977–1978); Vanderbilt (1979–1982)
- NBA draft: 1982: 3rd round, 54th overall pick
- Drafted by: Los Angeles Lakers
- Playing career: 1982–1989
- Position: Small forward
- Number: 23, 22

Career history
- 1982: San Diego Clippers
- 1982–1983: Las Vegas/Albuquerque Silvers
- 1983: San Diego Clippers
- 1984: Wyoming Wildcatters
- 1984–1985: Master Roma
- 1985–1986: Gran Canaria
- 1986–1987: RCD Espanyol
- 1987–1988: Gran Canaria
- 1988–1989: Sant Josep

Career highlights
- First-team All-SEC (1982)
- Stats at NBA.com
- Stats at Basketball Reference

Willie D. "Hutch" Jones (born September 1, 1959) is an American former professional basketball player. He played in the National Basketball Association for the San Diego Clippers for 13 games at the starts of both the 1982–83 and 1983–84 seasons before embarking on a seven-year career in Spain and Italy. Jones also played briefly in the Continental Basketball Association over the 1982–83 and 1983–84 seasons, for the Las Vegas/Albuquerque Silvers and for the Wyoming Wildcatters.

== Career statistics ==
Legend
GP	Games played	GS	Games started	MPG	Minutes per game
FG%	Field goal percentage	3P%	3-point field goal percentage	FT%	Free throw percentage
RPG	Rebounds per game	APG	Assists per game	SPG	Steals per game
BPG	Blocks per game	PPG	Points per game	**Bold**	Career high

=== NBA ===
==== Regular season ====
Year	Team	GP	GS	MPG	FG%	3P%	FT%	RPG	APG	SPG	BPG	PPG
1982–83	San Diego	**9**	0	**9.4**	**.459**	–	**1.000**	**1.9**	**.4**	**.3**	.0	**4.4**
1983–84	San Diego	4	0	4.5	.000	–	.250	.0	.0	**.3**	.0	.3
Career		13	0	7.9	.425	–	.700	1.3	.3	.3	.0	3.2
