= Jim Paxson =

National Basketball Association player

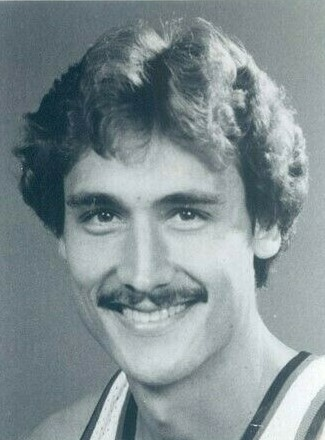

Personal information
- Born: July 9, 1957 (age 69) Kettering, Ohio, U.S.
- Listed height: 6 ft 6 in (1.98 m)
- Listed weight: 200 lb (91 kg)

Career information
- High school: Archbishop Alter (Kettering, Ohio)
- College: Dayton (1975–1979)
- NBA draft: 1979: 1st round, 12th overall pick
- Drafted by: Portland Trail Blazers
- Playing career: 1979–1990
- Position: Shooting guard / small forward
- Number: 4

Career history
- 1979–1988: Portland Trail Blazers
- 1988–1990: Boston Celtics

Career highlights
- 2× NBA All-Star (1983, 1984); All-NBA Second Team (1984); Consensus second-team All-American (1979)

Career NBA statistics
- Points: 11,199 (14.3 ppg)
- Rebounds: 1,593 (2.0 rpg)
- Assists: 2,300 (2.9 apg)
- Stats at NBA.com
- Stats at Basketball Reference

James Joseph Paxson Jr. (born July 9, 1957) is an American former professional basketball player. A first round selection (12th pick overall) of the Portland Trail Blazers in the 1979 NBA draft, Paxson played for Portland and the Boston Celtics of the NBA from 1979 to 1990 and was twice an All-Star. Paxson served as general manager of the Cleveland Cavaliers for six years and now works as a consultant with the Chicago Bulls where his brother John is an executive.

== Pre-NBA ==
Paxson, a swingman born in Kettering, Ohio and the son of former NBA player Jim Paxson Sr., played college basketball at the University of Dayton. When the older Paxson tried out for the Dayton Flyers, he couldn't afford to buy athletic shoes, so athletic director Thomas Frericks loaned him a pair. Paxson was a three-time team MVP and earned All-America honors as a senior after averaging more than 23 points per game. He also averaged 17 points as a junior and 18 points as a sophomore at Dayton.

== Career ==
The 6-foot-6 Paxson was an NBA All-Star in 1983 and 1984. He also earned All-NBA Second Team honors in 1984 after averaging 21 points per game. He spent nine seasons with Portland (1979–1988) and, after being traded to Boston in February 1988, spent two full seasons with Boston (1988–1990). When he was traded from Portland, he left as the team's all-time leading scorer.

== Post-playing career ==
After retiring in 1990 at the age of 32, Paxson joined Portland's front office as assistant general manager. In September 1998, he was named vice president of basketball operations for the Cleveland Cavaliers. He was promoted to general manager in 1999, serving in that position until he was fired in April 2005. The Cavaliers won 185 games and lost 307 games in the six years Paxson was general manager.

In July 2006, Paxson, the older brother of former Chicago Bulls guard and former Chicago Bulls Executive Vice President of basketball operations John Paxson, was hired as a consultant for the Bulls. Paxson was inducted into the Oregon Sports Hall of Fame in 1998. In 2004, he was named to the University of Dayton's All-Century Team.

== NBA career statistics ==
Legend
GP	Games played	GS	Games started	MPG	Minutes per game
FG%	Field goal percentage	3P%	3-point field goal percentage	FT%	Free throw percentage
RPG	Rebounds per game	APG	Assists per game	SPG	Steals per game
BPG	Blocks per game	PPG	Points per game	**Bold**	Career high

=== Regular season ===
Year	Team	GP	GS	MPG	FG%	3P%	FT%	RPG	APG	SPG	BPG	PPG
1979–80	Portland	72	–	17.6	.411	.045	.711	1.5	2.0	.7	.1	6.2
1980–81	Portland	79	–	**34.2**	**.536**	.067	.734	2.7	3.8	**1.8**	.1	17.1
1981–82	Portland	**82**	**82**	33.6	.526	.229	.767	2.7	3.4	1.6	.1	18.9
1982–83	Portland	81	81	33.8	.515	.160	.812	2.1	2.9	1.7	**.2**	**21.7**
1983–84	Portland	81	81	33.2	.514	.288	.841	2.1	3.1	1.5	.1	21.3
1984–85	Portland	68	57	33.1	.514	.154	.790	**3.3**	**3.9**	1.5	.1	17.9
1985–86	Portland	75	31	25.7	.470	.323	**.889**	2.0	3.7	1.3	.1	13.1
1986–87	Portland	72	1	25.0	.460	.265	.806	1.9	3.3	1.1	**.2**	12.1
1987–88	Portland	17	1	15.5	.402	**.375**	.778	1.1	1.6	.4	.1	6.1
1987–88	Boston	28	2	19.2	.492	.154	.885	1.0	1.8	.8	.1	8.7
1988–89	Boston	57	7	20.0	.454	.167	.816	1.3	1.9	.7	.1	8.6
1989–90	Boston	72	25	17.8	.453	.250	.811	1.1	1.9	.5	.1	6.4
Career		784	368	27.2	.498	.225	.807	2.0	2.9	1.2	.1	14.3
All-Star		2	0	15.5	.625	–	.500	1.5	1.5	1.0	.0	10.5

=== Playoffs ===
Year	Team	GP	GS	MPG	FG%	3P%	FT%	RPG	APG	SPG	BPG	PPG
1980	Portland	3	–	14.7	.313	–	**1.000**	1.3	1.0	.7	**.3**	5.3
1981	Portland	1	–	4.0	.000	–	–	.0	.0	.0	.0	0.0
1983	Portland	7	–	**37.1**	**.586**	**.500**	.758	2.1	2.6	**1.3**	.1	**23.3**
1984	Portland	5	–	34.4	.513	.200	.825	**3.8**	2.4	.4	.0	22.8
1985	Portland	9	0	23.6	.465	.300	.792	2.2	2.3	.7	.0	12.9
1986	Portland	4	0	17.8	.378	.333	.800	1.0	**3.8**	.8	.0	10.5
1987	Portland	4	0	23.5	.406	.000	.889	2.3	3.3	**1.3**	.0	8.5
1988	Boston	**15**	0	12.5	.288	.000	.800	.6	.7	.4	.1	3.3
1990	Boston	5	0	12.4	.500	.000	.750	.0	1.4	1.0	.0	3.8
Career		53	0	20.9	.463	.267	.808	1.5	1.9	.7	.1	10.5
