= Gus Williams (basketball) =

American basketball player (1953–2025)

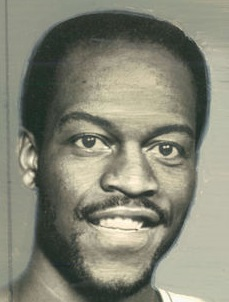
- Williams in 1981

Personal information
- Born: October 10, 1953 Mount Vernon, New York, U.S.
- Died: January 15, 2025 (aged 71) Baltimore, Maryland, U.S.
- Listed height: 6 ft 2 in (1.88 m)
- Listed weight: 175 lb (79 kg)

Career information
- High school: Mount Vernon (Mount Vernon, New York)
- College: USC (1972–1975)
- NBA draft: 1975: 2nd round, 20th overall pick
- Drafted by: Golden State Warriors
- Playing career: 1975–1987
- Position: Point guard
- Number: 1

Career history
- 1975–1977: Golden State Warriors
- 1977–1984: Seattle SuperSonics
- 1984–1986: Washington Bullets
- 1987: Atlanta Hawks

Career highlights
- NBA champion (1979); 2× NBA All-Star (1982, 1983); All-NBA First Team (1982); All-NBA Second Team (1980); NBA Comeback Player of the Year (1982); NBA All-Rookie First Team (1976); No. 1 retired by Seattle SuperSonics; Consensus second-team All-American (1975); First-team All-Pac-8 (1975); No. 10 retired by USC Trojans; Second-team Parade All-American (1971)

Career statistics
- Points: 14,093 (17.1 ppg)
- Assists: 4,597 (5.6 apg)
- Steals: 1,638 (2.0 spg)
- Stats at NBA.com
- Stats at Basketball Reference

Gus Williams (October 10, 1953 – January 15, 2025) was an American professional basketball player in the National Basketball Association (NBA). Nicknamed "the Wizard", he was a two-time NBA All-Star playing for the Seattle SuperSonics, winning an NBA championship in 1979.

Williams played college basketball for the USC Trojans and was selected by the Golden State Warriors in the second round of the 1975 NBA draft. He later played for the Warriors, SuperSonics, Washington Bullets and Atlanta Hawks.

== Early life ==
Williams was born in Mount Vernon, New York. He played high school basketball at Mount Vernon High, where he was selected player of the year in 1971 by the New York State Sportswriters Association. He played college basketball at the University of Southern California, where both he led the Pac-8 in scoring and was named an All-American in 1975.

== Professional career ==
Williams was selected in the second round of the 1975 NBA draft by the Golden State Warriors and in the first round of the 1975 American Basketball Association draft by the Spirits of St. Louis. Williams signed with the Warriors for the 1975–76 season and was named to the NBA All-Rookie Team in his first season. Williams played two seasons with the Warriors before he left as a free agent before the 1977–78 season, when he signed with the Seattle SuperSonics. There Williams was paired with renowned defender Dennis Johnson to form a dynamic backcourt duo, and helped the team to two consecutive NBA Finals appearances.

While with Seattle, Williams was eventually twice selected to the NBA All-Star Game, and was an All-NBA First Team (1982) and All-NBA Second Team (1980) selection. Williams, whose style of play earned him the nickname "the Wizard", led the Sonics to the 1979 league title while averaging a team-high 28.6 points per game in the 1979 NBA Finals.

While in the prime of his career, Williams stunned the basketball world when he decided to sit out the 1980–81 season due to a contract dispute. He returned in 1981–82 and was named the NBA Comeback Player of the Year after finishing seventh in the league in scoring with a career-high 23.4 points per game. He played two more seasons with the Sonics after that. In 1984, he was traded to the Washington Bullets for Ricky Sobers and the draft rights to Tim McCormick. During the 1984–85 season Williams played alongside the similarly named Guy Williams.

He finished his career with a 17.1 point-per-game scoring average in a career spanning 12 years from 1975 to 1987. In 2004, Williams's No. 1 jersey was retired by the Sonics. In 2016, Williams's jersey was retired by USC.

Williams's younger brother Ray (1954–2013) also played in the NBA.

== Illness and death ==
Williams suffered a stroke in February 2020 and later moved to an assisted care facility in the Baltimore area. He died from complications on January 15, 2025, at the age of 71.

== NBA career statistics ==
Legend
GP	Games played	GS	Games started	MPG	Minutes per game
FG%	Field goal percentage	3P%	3-point field goal percentage	FT%	Free throw percentage
RPG	Rebounds per game	APG	Assists per game	SPG	Steals per game
BPG	Blocks per game	PPG	Points per game	**Bold**	Career high
†	Won an NBA championship

=== Regular season ===
Year	Team	GP	GS	MPG	FG%	3P%	FT%	RPG	APG	SPG	BPG	PPG
1975–76	Golden State	77	–	22.4	.428	–	.742	2.1	3.1	1.8	0.3	11.7
1976–77	Golden State	**82**	–	23.5	.464	–	.747	2.8	3.6	1.5	0.2	9.3
1977–78	Seattle	79	–	32.6	.451	–	**.817**	3.2	3.7	2.3	**0.5**	18.1
1978–79†	Seattle	76	–	29.8	**.495**	–	.775	3.2	4.0	2.1	0.4	19.2
1979–80	Seattle	**82**	–	36.2	.482	.194	.788	**3.4**	4.8	**2.4**	**0.5**	22.1
1981–82	Seattle	80	**80**	36.0	.486	.225	.734	3.1	6.9	2.2	**0.5**	**23.4**
1982–83	Seattle	80	**80**	34.5	.477	.047	.751	2.6	8.0	2.3	0.3	20.0
1983–84	Seattle	80	**80**	35.2	.458	.160	.750	2.6	**8.4**	**2.4**	0.3	18.7
1984–85	Washington	79	78	**37.5**	.430	**.290**	.725	2.5	7.7	2.3	0.4	20.0
1985–86	Washington	77	67	29.7	.428	.259	.734	2.2	5.9	1.2	0.2	13.5
1986–87	Atlanta	33	0	14.6	.363	.278	.675	1.2	4.2	0.5	0.2	4.5
Career		825	385	31.1	.461	.238	.756	2.7	5.6	2.0	0.4	17.1
All-Star		2	1	20.5	.429	.000	1.000	1.5	6.5	1.0	0.0	14.0

=== Playoffs ===
Year	Team	GP	GS	MPG	FG%	3P%	FT%	RPG	APG	SPG	BPG	PPG
1976	Golden State	11	–	16.2	.353	–	.667	1.3	2.4	1.0	0.0	6.7
1977	Golden State	10	–	18.4	.500	–	.857	1.5	2.5	0.8	0.1	8.8
1978	Seattle	**22**	–	31.9	.477	–	.726	3.9	4.0	2.0	0.5	18.3
1979†	Seattle	17	–	36.4	.476	–	.709	**4.1**	3.7	2.0	**0.6**	26.7
1980	Seattle	15	–	37.6	.514	.200	.721	4.0	5.6	2.3	0.5	23.7
1982	Seattle	8	–	39.4	.441	**.333**	.786	3.3	8.1	1.6	**0.6**	26.3
1983	Seattle	2	–	40.5	**.553**	.000	**.867**	3.5	4.0	**2.5**	0.0	**32.5**
1984	Seattle	5	–	**43.0**	.510	**.333**	.714	2.4	**11.4**	1.6	**0.6**	23.4
1985	Washington	4	4	39.8	.423	.300	.750	2.0	5.0	1.3	0.3	18.0
1986	Washington	5	5	39.8	.481	.100	.778	2.0	6.6	2.2	0.0	18.2
Career		99	9	32.5	.476	.231	.737	3.1	4.7	1.8	0.4	19.5

== See also ==
- List of National Basketball Association career steals leaders
- List of National Basketball Association players with most steals in a game
