= Mike Sanders (basketball) =

American basketball player (born 1960)

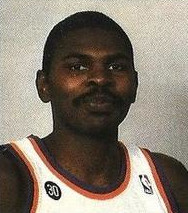
- Sanders in 1987

Personal information
- Born: May 7, 1960 (age 66) Vidalia, Louisiana, U.S.
- Listed height: 6 ft 6 in (1.98 m)
- Listed weight: 210 lb (95 kg)

Career information
- High school: DeRidder (DeRidder, Louisiana)
- College: UCLA (1978–1982)
- NBA draft: 1982: 4th round, 74th overall pick
- Drafted by: Kansas City Kings
- Playing career: 1982–1993
- Position: Shooting guard
- Number: 35, 7, 11, 33
- Coaching career: 1998–2014

Career history

Playing
- 1982–1983: Montana Golden Nuggets
- 1983: San Antonio Spurs
- 1983: Sarasota Stingers
- 1983–1988: Phoenix Suns
- 1988–1989: Cleveland Cavaliers
- 1989–1991: Indiana Pacers
- 1991–1993: Cleveland Cavaliers

Coaching
- 1998–1999: Wisconsin Blast
- 1999–2000: Black Hills Gold
- 2000: Washington Congressionals
- 2000–2001: Detroit Pistons (assistant)
- 2001–2005: Asheville Altitude (assistant)
- 2002–2004: Adirondack Wildcats
- 2005–2007: Milwaukee Bucks (assistant)
- 2007–2008: Charlotte Bobcats (assistant)
- 2008–2009: Minot SkyRockets
- 2009–2011: Fort Wayne Mad Ants (assistant)
- 2012–2014: Utah Jazz (assistant)

Career highlights
- All-CBA First Team (1983); CBA All-Defensive Second Team (1983); CBA Rookie of the Year (1983); 2× First-team All-Pac-10 (1981, 1982); Third-team Parade All-American (1978)

Career NBA statistics
- Points: 5,162 (8.0 ppg)
- Rebounds: 1,927 (3.0 rpg)
- Assists: 880 (1.4 apg)
- Stats at NBA.com
- Stats at Basketball Reference

Michael Anthony Sanders (born May 7, 1960) is an American former professional basketball player who played primarily as a small forward. He was selected by the Kansas City Kings in the fourth round (5th pick) and was the 74th overall pick in the 1982 NBA draft. He is a former assistant coach for the Utah Jazz of the National Basketball Association (NBA). Prior to being an assistant coach for Tyrone Corbin, Sanders was the team's director of player development.

== Playing career ==
Born in Vidalia, Louisiana, Sanders was selected by the Kansas City Kings with the 74th overall pick of the 1982 NBA draft after the close of his college career at UCLA. Over the course of 11 NBA seasons, Sanders averaged eight points and three rebounds per game. He played for the San Antonio Spurs, Phoenix Suns, Cleveland Cavaliers and Indiana Pacers during this time.

Early in his career, Sanders played parts of two seasons in the Continental Basketball Association (CBA) for the Montana Golden Nuggets and Sarasota Stingers. He averaged 23.3 points and 8.9 rebounds in 37 career games in the league, earning CBA Rookie of the Year, All-CBA First Team All-Defensive second team honors in 1983.

== Coaching career ==
After retiring from the NBA, Sanders became a head coach of the Black Hills Gold in the IBA, the Wisconsin Blast of the IBA and the Adirondack Wildcats of the USBL.

Sanders also served as an assistant coach with the Detroit Pistons, Milwaukee Bucks and Charlotte Bobcats.

== Career playing statistics ==
Legend
GP	Games played	GS	Games started	MPG	Minutes per game
FG%	Field goal percentage	3P%	3-point field goal percentage	FT%	Free throw percentage
RPG	Rebounds per game	APG	Assists per game	SPG	Steals per game
BPG	Blocks per game	PPG	Points per game	**Bold**	Career high
*	Led the league

=== NBA ===
==== Regular season ====
Year	Team	GP	GS	MPG	FG%	3P%	FT%	RPG	APG	SPG	BPG	PPG
1982–83	San Antonio	26	0	15.1	.484	.000	.721	3.6	.7	.7	.2	7.0
1983–84	Phoenix	50	0	11.7	.478	–	.690	2.1	.9	.5	.2	4.5
1984–85	Phoenix	21	11	19.9	.486	–	.763	**4.2**	1.4	**1.1**	.2	10.2
1985–86	Phoenix	**82**	5	20.0	.513	.200	.809	3.3	1.8	.9	.4	**11.0**
1986–87	Phoenix	**82***	4	20.2	.494	.118	.781	3.3	1.5	.7	.3	10.5
1987–88	Phoenix	35	5	13.3	.480	.000	.736	1.8	.9	.5	.1	5.8
1987–88	Cleveland	24	11	17.4	.538	–	**.870**	2.0	1.1	.5	.2	6.8
1988–89	Cleveland	**82***	**82***	25.6	.453	.300	.719	3.7	1.6	**1.1**	.4	9.3
1989–90	Indiana	**82***	13	18.7	.470	**.357**	.733	2.8	1.1	.5	.3	6.2
1990–91	Indiana	80	7	17.0	.417	.200	.825	2.3	1.3	.5	.3	5.8
1991–92	Indiana	10	0	8.1	.500	–	.833	.8	1.1	.2	.1	2.7
1991–92	Cleveland	21	20	**26.3**	**.583**	.333	.756	**4.2**	**2.0**	1.0	.4	9.2
1992–93	Cleveland	53	51	22.4	.497	.250	.756	3.2	1.4	.7	**.6**	8.6
Career		648	209	19.1	.482	.221	.769	3.0	1.4	.7	.3	8.0

==== Playoffs ====
Year	Team	GP	GS	MPG	FG%	3P%	FT%	RPG	APG	SPG	BPG	PPG
1983	San Antonio	6		4.2	.538	–	–	1.5	.7	.0	.0	2.3
1984	Phoenix	15		10.1	.478	–	**.941**	1.3	.5	.4	.3	4.0
1985	Phoenix	3	3	**30.3**	.595	–	.800	**5.0**	**3.3**	**1.7**	.0	**17.3**
1988	Cleveland	5	5	26.8	.538	.000	.800	**5.0**	1.4	.6	.4	12.8
1989	Cleveland	5	3	17.4	.500	–	.600	3.2	.8	.4	.2	6.6
1990	Indiana	3	0	8.0	.455	**1.000**	–	2.0	.7	.0	.0	3.7
1991	Indiana	5	0	8.2	**.600**	.500	.500	.8	.8	.8	.4	3.0
1992	Cleveland	**17**	**17**	24.6	.487	.333	.810	3.2	2.2	.9	**.7**	6.0
1993	Cleveland	8	7	18.1	.417	.000	.600	2.3	1.3	1.0	.1	5.8
Career		67	35	16.7	.500	.333	.779	2.5	1.3	.6	.3	6.3
