= Jim Johnstone (basketball) =

American basketball player (born 1960)

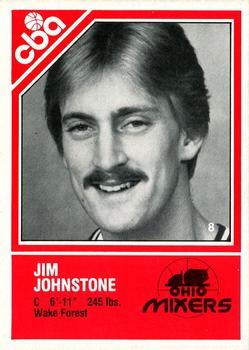

Personal information
- Born: September 20, 1960 (age 66) New Canaan, Connecticut
- Listed height: 6 ft 11 in (2.11 m)
- Listed weight: 245 lb (111 kg)

Career information
- High school: Lewiston-Porter Central (Youngstown, New York)
- College: Wake Forest (1978–1982)
- NBA draft: 1982: 3rd round, 51st overall pick
- Drafted by: Kansas City Kings
- Playing career: 1982–1986
- Position: Power forward / center
- Number: 25, 34

Career history
- 1982: San Antonio Spurs
- 1982–1983: Ohio Mixers
- 1983: Detroit Pistons
- 1983–1984: Scaligera Verona
- 1984–1985: Le Mans Sarthe
- 1985–1986: Mens Sana Basket

Career highlights
- Second-team All-ACC (1982)
- Stats at NBA.com
- Stats at Basketball Reference

James Robert Johnstone (born September 20, 1960) is an American former professional basketball player. He played at center or forward. Johnstone played for the National Basketball Association's San Antonio Spurs and Detroit Pistons in 1982–83.

Born in New Canaan, Connecticut, Johnstone attended Lewiston-Porter Central School District in Youngstown, New York and attended college at Wake Forest University from 1978 to 1982.

He was drafted by the Kansas City Kings in the third round of the 1982 NBA draft. Johnstone played in 23 games for the Spurs and Pistons.

== Career statistics ==
Legend
GP	Games played	GS	Games started	MPG	Minutes per game
FG%	Field goal percentage	3P%	3-point field goal percentage	FT%	Free throw percentage
RPG	Rebounds per game	APG	Assists per game	SPG	Steals per game
BPG	Blocks per game	PPG	Points per game	**Bold**	Career high

=== NBA ===
==== Regular season ====
Year	Team	GP	GS	MPG	FG%	3P%	FT%	RPG	APG	SPG	BPG	PPG
1982–83	San Antonio	7	0	7.7	.200	–	**.600**	**2.3**	.1	**.1**	.1	1.0
1982–83	Detroit	**16**	0	**8.6**	**.450**	–	.400	**1.9**	**.6**	**.1**	**.4**	**1.5**
Career		23	0	8.3	.367	–	.450	2.0	.5	.1	.3	1.3
