= 1983 NBA All-Star Game =

Exhibition basketball game

	1	2	3	4	Total
East	42	27	34	29	132
West	31	33	26	33	123
- Date: February 13, 1983
- Arena: The Forum
- City: Inglewood
- MVP: Julius Erving
- National anthem: Marvin Gaye
- Attendance: 17,505
- Network: CBS
- Announcers: Dick Stockton, Bill Russell, Pat O'Brien

NBA All-Star Game
< 1982	1984 >

The 33rd National Basketball Association All-Star Game was an exhibition basketball game played on February 13, 1983, at The Forum in Inglewood, California, the home of the Los Angeles Lakers. This was the third All-Star Game to be held in the Los Angeles metropolitan area and hosted by the Lakers, following the 1963 game at the Los Angeles Memorial Sports Arena and the 1972 game, which was also held at the Forum.

The Eastern Conference defeated the Western Conference, 132–123. The Most Valuable Player was Julius Erving of the Philadelphia 76ers, after scoring a game-high 25 points.

The game was most notable for being one of Marvin Gaye's last televised appearances, where he sang a soulful, drum machine-accompanied version of "The Star-Spangled Banner" before the game. This rendition gained newfound fame in 2008 when Nike used it in a video promoting the United States men's national basketball team. The colors were by the Edwards Air Force Base color guard, carrying the American, California, and Air Force flags.

== Coaches ==
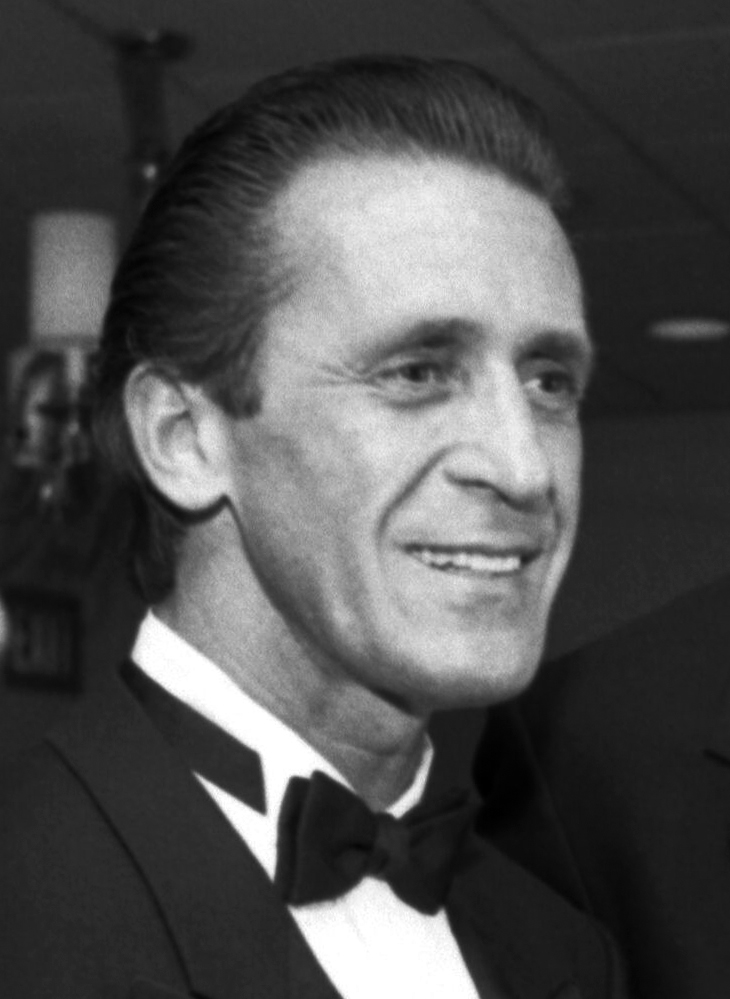
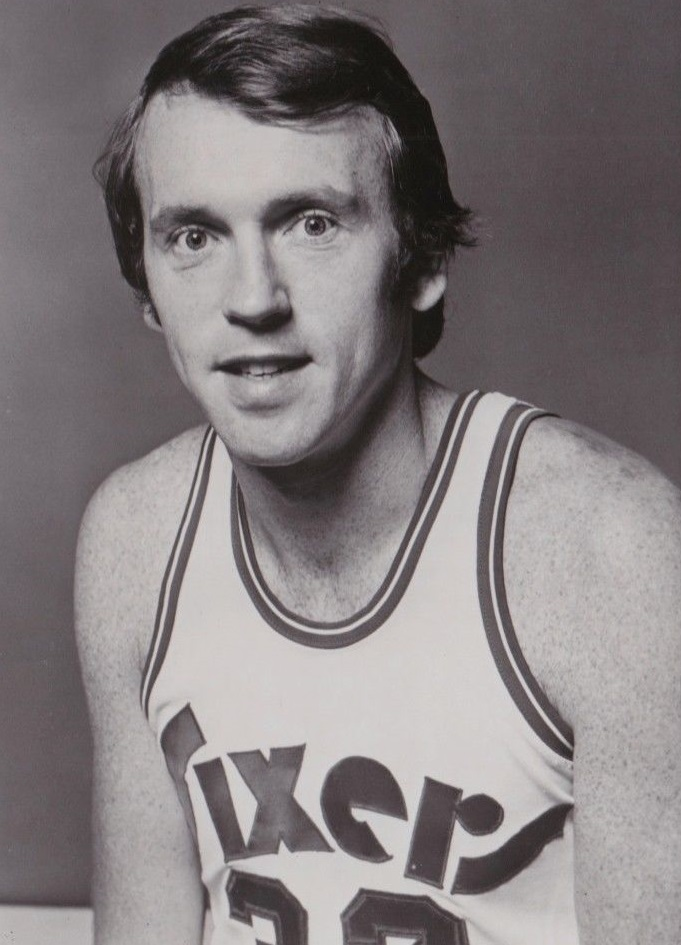
Pat Riley and Billy Cunningham were selected as the West and East head coach, respectively.

Pat Riley, head coach of the Western Conference leader Los Angeles Lakers, coached the West team. Billy Cunningham, head coach of the Eastern Conference leader Philadelphia 76ers, coached the East team. Both would be the coaches at the following summer's NBA Finals.

== Rosters ==
Eastern Conference All-Stars
Pos.	Player	Team	Appearance
Coach
HC	Billy Cunningham	Philadelphia 76ers	4th
Starters
PG	Isiah Thomas	Detroit Pistons	2nd
SG	Maurice Cheeks	Philadelphia 76ers	1st
SF	Larry Bird	Boston Celtics	4th
PF	Julius Erving	Philadelphia 76ers	7th
C	Moses Malone	Philadelphia 76ers	6th
Reserves
SF/SG	Marques Johnson	Milwaukee Bucks	4th
C/PF	Bill Laimbeer	Detroit Pistons	1st
PG	Sidney Moncrief	Milwaukee Bucks	2nd
C	Robert Parish	Boston Celtics	3rd
SG	Reggie Theus	Chicago Bulls	2nd
PG	Andrew Toney	Philadelphia 76ers	1st
C	Buck Williams	New Jersey Nets	2nd

Western Conference All-Stars
Pos.	Player	Team	Appearance
Coach
HC	Pat Riley	Los Angeles Lakers	2nd
Starters
PG	Magic Johnson	Los Angeles Lakers	3rd
SG	David Thompson	Seattle SuperSonics	4th
SF	Alex English	Denver Nuggets	2nd
PF	Maurice Lucas	Phoenix Suns	4th
C	Kareem Abdul-Jabbar	Los Angeles Lakers	13th
Reserves
SF/SG	George Gervin	San Antonio Spurs	7th
C	Artis Gilmore	San Antonio Spurs	5th
SF/SG	Jim Paxson	Portland Trail Blazers	1st
C/PF	Jack Sikma	Seattle SuperSonics	5th
SF	Kiki Vandeweghe	Denver Nuggets	1st
PG	Gus Williams	Seattle SuperSonics	2nd
SF/SG	Jamaal Wilkes	Los Angeles Lakers	3rd

== Eastern Conference ==
Player, Team	MIN	FGM	FGA	3PM	3PA	FTM	FTA	REB	AST	BLK	PFS	PTS
Isiah Thomas, DET	29	9	14	0	0	1	1	4	7	0	0	19
Larry Bird, BOS	29	7	14	0	1	0	0	13	7	0	4	14
Julius Erving, PHI	28	11	19	0	0	3	3	6	3	2	1	25
Sidney Moncrief, MIL	28	8	14	0	0	4	5	5	4	1	1	20
Moses Malone, PHI	24	3	8	0	0	4	6	8	3	1	1	10
Marques Johnson, MIL	20	3	10	0	0	1	2	2	2	1	1	7
Buck Williams, NJN	19	3	4	0	0	2	4	7	1	0	3	8
Robert Parish, BOS	18	5	6	0	0	3	4	3	0	1	2	13
Andrew Toney, PHI	18	4	5	0	1	0	0	1	7	0	0	8
Maurice Cheeks, PHI	18	3	8	0	0	0	0	1	1	0	0	6
Reggie Theus, CHI	8	0	5	0	0	0	0	1	1	0	1	0
Bill Laimbeer, DET	6	1	1	0	0	0	0	1	0	0	1	2
Totals	240	57	108	0	2	18	25	52	36	6	15	132

== Western Conference ==
Player, Team	MIN	FGM	FGA	3PM	3PA	FTM	FTA	REB	AST	BLK	PFS	PTS
Magic Johnson, LAL	33	7	16	0	1	3	4	5	16	0	2	17
Kareem Abdul-Jabbar, LAL	32	9	12	0	0	2	3	6	5	4	1	20
Maurice Lucas, PHO	27	3	8	0	0	0	1	7	1	0	1	6
Alex English, DEN	23	7	14	0	0	0	1	4	0	2	2	14
Jim Paxson, POR	17	5	7	0	0	1	2	0	1	0	0	11
David Thompson, SEA	17	5	7	0	0	0	0	1	2	0	2	10
Jack Sikma, SEA	17	4	6	0	0	0	0	3	1	1	2	8
Artis Gilmore, SAS	16	2	4	0	0	1	2	5	1	0	4	5
Jamaal Wilkes, LAL	15	4	6	0	0	2	2	2	2	0	0	10
Gus Williams, SEA	15	3	9	0	0	0	0	1	4	0	1	6
George Gervin, SAS	14	3	8	1	1	2	2	0	3	0	3	9
Kiki Vandeweghe, DEN	14	3	4	0	0	1	2	3	1	0	0	7
Totals	240	55	101	1	2	12	19	37	37	7	18	123
