= James Worthy =

American basketball player (born 1961)

- Worthy in 2011

Personal information
- Born: February 27, 1961 (age 65) Gastonia, North Carolina, U.S.
- Listed height: 6 ft 9 in (2.06 m)
- Listed weight: 225 lb (102 kg)

Career information
- High school: Ashbrook (Gastonia, North Carolina)
- College: North Carolina (1979–1982)
- NBA draft: 1982: 1st round, 1st overall pick
- Drafted by: Los Angeles Lakers
- Playing career: 1982–1994
- Position: Small forward
- Number: 42, 00

Career history
- 1982–1994: Los Angeles Lakers

Career highlights
- 3× NBA champion (1985, 1987, 1988); NBA Finals MVP (1988); 7× NBA All-Star (1986–1992); 2× All-NBA Third Team (1990, 1991); NBA All-Rookie First Team (1983); NBA anniversary team (50th, 75th); No. 42 retired by Los Angeles Lakers; NCAA champion (1982); NCAA Final Four Most Outstanding Player (1982); Helms Foundation Player of the Year (1982); Consensus first-team All-American (1982); ACC Athlete of the Year (1982); First-team All-ACC (1982); Second-team All-ACC (1981); ACC tournament MVP (1982); No. 52 retired by North Carolina Tar Heels; First-team Parade All-American (1979); Second-team Parade All-American (1978); McDonald's All-American (1979)

Career NBA statistics
- Points: 16,320 (17.6 ppg)
- Rebounds: 4,708 (5.1 rpg)
- Assists: 2,791 (3.0 apg)
- Stats at NBA.com
- Stats at Basketball Reference
- Basketball Hall of Fame
- Collegiate Basketball Hall of Fame
Medals
Men's basketball
Representing the United States
FIBA U19 World Championship
Gold medal – first place	1979 Salvador	National team

James Ager Worthy (born February 27, 1961) is an American former professional basketball player. Nicknamed "Big Game James", he played his entire 12-year professional career with the Los Angeles Lakers in the National Basketball Association (NBA). Worthy was a seven-time NBA All-Star, a two-time All-NBA Team member who won three NBA championships and was voted the NBA Finals Most Valuable Player (MVP) in 1988. He was named to both the NBA's 50th and 75th anniversary teams. Worthy has been regarded by many as one of the greatest small forwards in NBA history.

A standout college basketball player for the North Carolina Tar Heels, the small forward was a consensus first-team All-American and shared national player of the year honors en route to leading his team to the 1982 NCAA championship. Named the NCAA tournament Most Outstanding Player, he was selected by the Lakers with the first overall pick of the 1982 NBA draft.

== Early life ==
Worthy was born in Gastonia, North Carolina. He averaged 21.5 points, 12.5 rebounds and 5.5 assists per game during his senior season at Ashbrook High School. In 1977, he helped lead Ashbrook to the NCHSAA 4A state championship game. He was named both a Parade Magazine and McDonald's All-American, and was selected to play in the 1979 McDonald's All-American Game, which featured future fellow Hall of Famers including Isiah Thomas, Dominique Wilkins, and Ralph Sampson.

== College career ==
After graduating from high school, Worthy attended the University of North Carolina at Chapel Hill. An immediate standout as a freshman, his debut was cut short near mid-season by a broken ankle. As a sophomore, he was a key member of UNC's 1981 NCAA runner-up team starring alongside Al Wood and Sam Perkins.

As a junior power forward Worthy was the leading scorer (15.6 points per game) of a Tar Heels NCAA championship team that featured one of the greatest collections of talent in collegiate basketball history, including future NBA stars sophomore Sam Perkins and freshman Michael Jordan. A consensus first-team All-American, Worthy was named co-winner of the Helms Foundation Player of the Year with Ralph Sampson of Virginia. He dominated the 1982 championship game against the Georgetown Hoyas, sealing the Tar Heels' 63–62 victory by intercepting an inadvertent pass thrown by Hoya point guard Fred Brown with just seconds remaining. His 13–17 shooting, 28 point, 4 rebound finale capped a standout performance throughout the NCAA tournament, earning him its Most Outstanding Player award. A tip dunk in front of Patrick Ewing captioned "James Worthy slams the door on Georgetown" made the cover of Sports Illustrated.

In the wake of this success, Worthy elected to forgo his senior year and enter the NBA draft. He completed his degree later, via summer school. He is one of eight players to have their numbers retired by the Tar Heels. In 2002, Worthy was named to the ACC 50th Anniversary men's basketball team honoring the fifty greatest players in Atlantic Coast Conference history.

== Professional career ==
=== Number 1 pick ===
The Los Angeles Lakers had received the Cleveland Cavaliers' 1982 first-round draft pick in a 1979 exchange for Don Ford. The Cavaliers finished with the NBA's worst record in the 1981–82 season, leaving a coin toss to decide whether they or the worst record runner-up San Diego Clippers would get the first overall pick in the upcoming draft. The Lakers won the flip, the first and only time a reigning NBA champion picked first overall. They chose Worthy over Dominique Wilkins and Terry Cummings.

=== 1982–1983 ===
The lanky small forward immediately made an impact as a rookie, averaging 13.4 points per game and shooting a Laker rookie record .579 field goal percentage. With his speed, dynamic ability to score with either hand, and dazzling play above the rim, Worthy thrived in the Lakers' high-octane "Showtime" offense. When not finishing fast breaks with his trademark Statue of Liberty dunks or swooping finger rolls, Worthy was also one of the best post players at his position, with a quick spin move off the low blocks and a deadly turnaround midrange jumpshot. His rookie year ended just when he was hitting his stride, breaking his leg on April 10, 1983, while landing improperly after trying to tap in a missed shot against the Phoenix Suns. He was still named to the 1983 All-Rookie First Team but missed the rest of the season and playoffs, with the Lakers being swept 4–0 by the Philadelphia 76ers in the Finals.

=== 1983–1984 ===
Back and healthy for the opening of the 1983–84 season, Worthy began the season as a starter at power forward in place of Kurt Rambis, who was on the injured reserve list. By December, Lakers head coach Pat Riley said that "it's becoming more and more obvious Worthy is not a legitimate power forward" due to his rebounding, describing him as "a finesse guy who likes to get the ball and go with it". The Los Angeles Times wrote that "he really is a small forward in a big forward's body." Worthy returned to the small forward position and came off the bench after Rambis recovered from his foot injuries. Riley cited Rambis's defense and rebounding. Worthy provided offense as a sixth man and was also prone to foul trouble. He developed into one of the league's top small forwards. He remained as a reserve even when All-Star small forward Jamaal Wilkes was sidelined by a gastrointestinal illness during the playoffs, as Riley opted to start Michael Cooper instead. However, Worthy became a starter in the final game of the Western Conference finals against the Suns. He was essential for the Lakers during the 1984 NBA Finals against the Boston Celtics. Late in Game 2, Worthy made an errant cross-court pass that was stolen by Gerald Henderson and taken in for the game-tying score, leading to a Celtics win in overtime. Boston won the series in seven games. Worthy had a very strong Finals, with 22.1 pts per game (second to Abdul-Jabbar) on 63.8% shooting. The Lakers would go into the off-season bitter about the loss and motivated for 1985.

=== 1984–1985 ===
Worthy began the 1984–85 season as a reserve, while Wilkes returned as the starting small forward. After the Lakers opened the season slowly and were outrebounded in each of their first four games, Riley started Worthy in place of Rambis. "We're looking for rebounding. We're experimenting", said the coach. A few games later, Riley replaced Wilkes in the starting lineup with Larry Spriggs. The Lakers dominated the West and returned to the NBA Finals. During the play-off run Worthy emerged as a feared clutch performer, averaging 21.5 points per game on 62.2% shooting in the playoffs and 23.7 points per game in a match-up against the Celtics in the championship series. His all-round play helped lead the team to a 4–2 victory clinched on the celebrated parquet floor of the old Boston Garden and confirmed him as one of the league's premier players. It was also in 1985 that Worthy first donned goggles after suffering a scratched cornea during a March 13 game at the Utah Jazz, wearing them for the rest of his career.

=== 1985–1986 ===
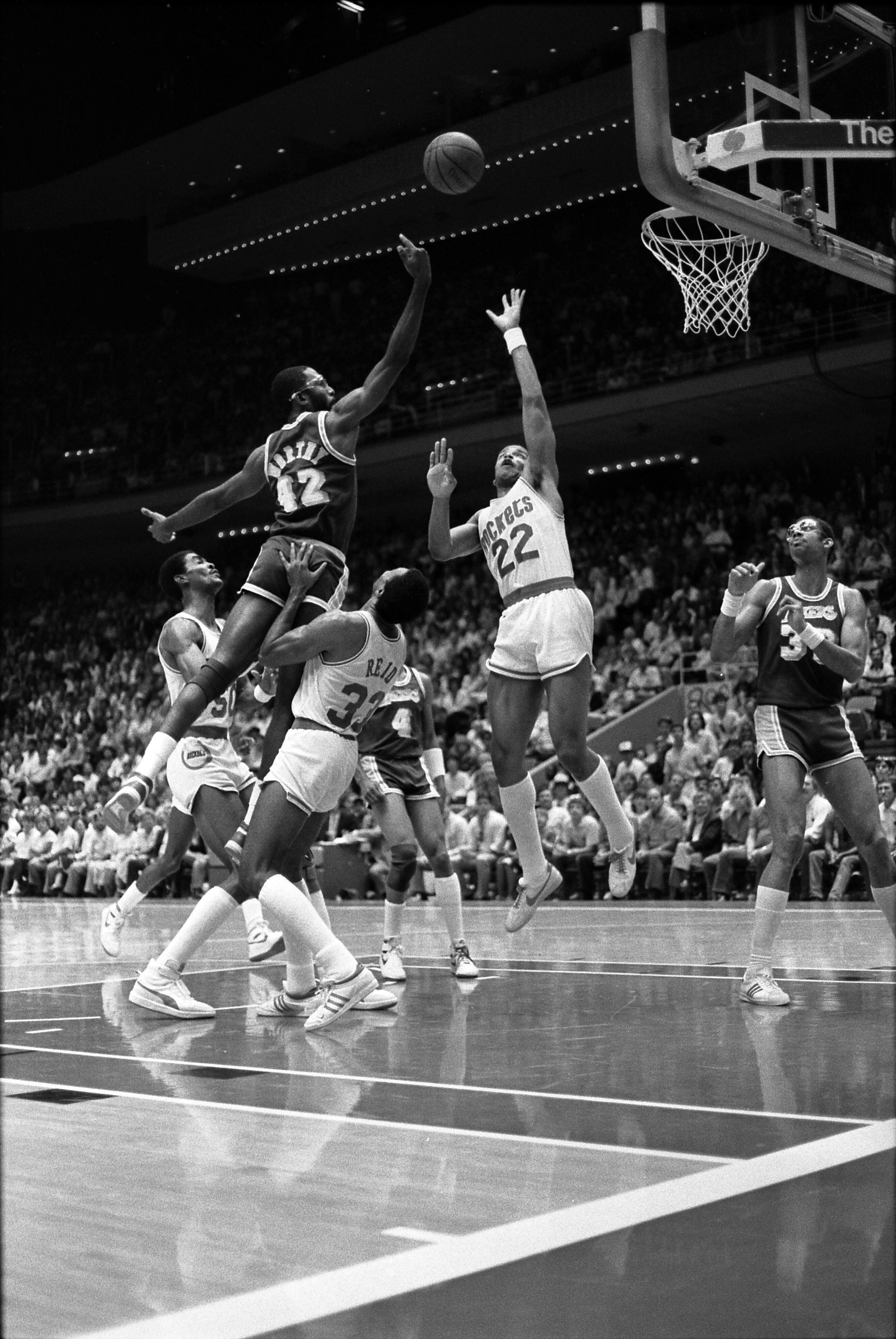
Worthy attempting a layup against the Houston Rockets in the 1986 playoffs

The 1985–86 season held tremendous promise for the Lakers, who again stormed through the regular season and seemed destined to meet Boston once again. Worthy continued to improve, raising his scoring from 17.6 to 20 points per game on 58% shooting and was named to the first of seven consecutive All-Star appearances. A trip to the Finals disappeared in a preternatural tip in the Western Conference final by 7' 4" Houston Rockets star Ralph Sampson, with the Rockets going on to be drubbed by the Celtics in the Championship series.

=== 1986–1987 ===
With center Abdul-Jabbar showing signs of his age the Lakers added center-forward Mychal Thompson during the 1986–1987 regular season to address the need for frontcourt help. The result was a 65–17 record and what many regard as one of the NBA's all-time great teams achieving another NBA title over the Celtics. Worthy was in his prime, leading the team with 23.6 points per game in the playoffs. He had a number of great games during this '87 play-off run, in particular a 39 point performance (including 6 dunks) in a 122–121 win at Seattle in Game 3 of the Western Conference Finals and 33 pts 10 assists 9 rebounds in a game 1 victory in the NBA Finals versus the Celtics. The Lakers won the championship 4 games to 2.

=== 1987–1988 ===
Once again Riley drove the Lakers hard in 1987–88. During the regular season Worthy averaged 19.7 points and scored 38 points against the Atlanta Hawks. He led the Lakers in scoring in the 1988 play-offs and led the NBA in points scored during the play-offs. During the Finals against the Pistons Worthy once again excelled, averaging 22 ppg, 7.4 rebounds, and 4.4 assists in the series. A 28-point, 9 rebound Game 6 and monster 36–16–10 triple-double that carried the Lakers to victory in Game 7 earned Worthy the NBA Finals MVP award and the Lakers the first back-to-back titles in the NBA since '68–'69 Celtics.

=== 1988–1989 ===
With Riley clamoring for a "Three-peat" in 1988–89 the Lakers marched through the regular season and met the Pistons for an encore in the Finals. With Abdul-Jabbar playing his last games and Johnson and Byron Scott missing three due to injuries even Worthy at his play-off best was not nearly enough. In spite of averaging a career Finals high 25.5 ppg, including a career-high 40 points trying to stave off elimination in Game 4, the Lakers were swept in four.

=== 1989–1990 ===
The Lakers ran hot again in 1989–90 despite internal friction that had developed during Pat Riley's final year as head coach, their 63–19 record the NBA's best. Worthy averaged 21.1 points per game and became the first player in NBA history to shoot at least 53% in each of his first eight seasons. In spite of stepped-up performances by both Johnson (25.2 ppg) and Worthy (24.2 ppg) in the play-offs, LA fell in the Conference semifinals to a hot Phoenix Suns team.

=== 1990–1991 ===
The Lakers once more won the West in 1991 and marched through the playoffs to the Finals thanks to Worthy's team-leading and career-high 21.4 ppg in '91 and the addition of former North Carolina Tarheel star Sam Perkins at center. Unfortunately, Worthy suffered a high ankle sprain in Game 5 of the Western Conference Finals against the Blazers and was very limited heading into the Finals against the Chicago Bulls. Despite LA pulling out a Game 1 victory in Chicago it ultimately wasn't enough against a surging Bulls squad led by another teammate from the 1982 NCAA Championship team, an emergent Michael Jordan. The Lakers ultimately fell in five, with Worthy sidelined for Game 5 after re-injuring his ankle the previous game.

=== Retirement ===
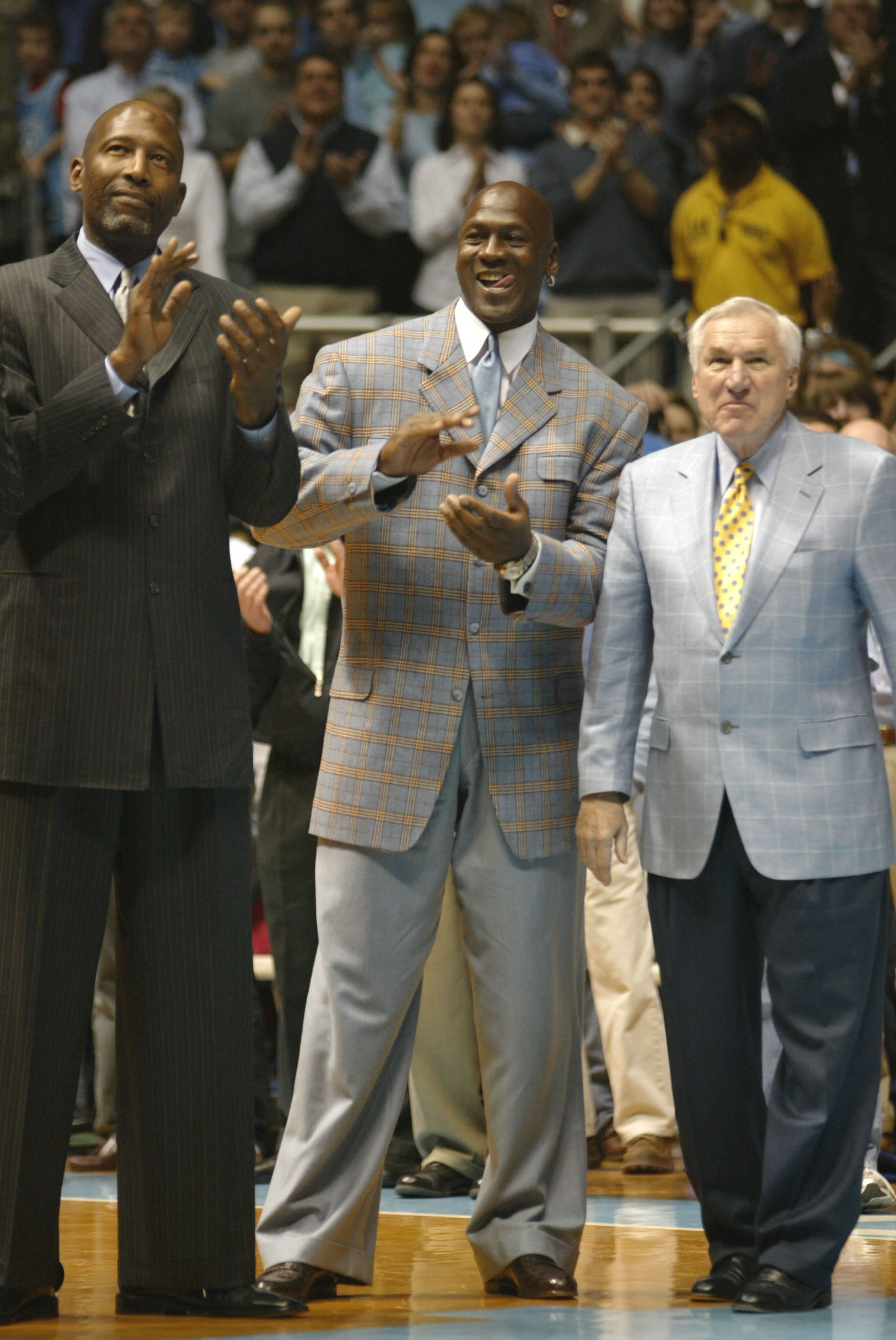
Worthy, Michael Jordan, and Dean Smith in 2007 at a North Carolina Tar Heels men's basketball game honoring the 1957 and 1982 men's basketball teams

Johnson's sudden retirement in November 1991 threw the Lakers franchise into disarray. Injuries and high mileage soon spelled the end for Worthy. The high ankle injury during the 1991 playoffs and season-ending knee surgery in 1992 robbed much of his quickness and leaping ability, and with it both his ability to finish on the fast break and drive to the hoop to score. After struggling with knee pain in the 1994–95 preseason and no prospects of another title run in any foreseeable future, Worthy announced his retirement in November 1994, after 12 seasons in the NBA.

== "Big Game James" ==
Even on Lakers teams led by fellow Hall of Fame members Abdul-Jabbar and Johnson, Worthy stood out during their years together. He led the Lakers in playoff scoring in their championship runs in 1987 (23.6) and 1988 (21.1) and was second to Abdul-Jabbar in the 1985 championship run (21.5). In the playoffs, he averaged 3.5 points higher per game than in the regular season. That, his heroics in the 1982 NCAA Championship game alongside Michael Jordan, spectacular offensive displays, and flashes of defensive brilliance, cemented his legacy as "Big Game James".

Worthy played in 926 NBA regular-season games, averaging 17.6 points, 5.1 rebounds and three assists per game. He played in 143 playoff games and averaged 21.1 points, 5.2 rebounds and 3.2 assists per game and had a 54.4 field goal percentage. In 34 NBA Finals games he averaged 22.2 pts per game on 53% shooting. Worthy played in 4 Game 7s in his career and averaged 27 points and 8.2 rebounds on 60% shooting in these winner-take-all contests. He ranks sixth all-time in Lakers team scoring (16,320), third all-time in team steals (1,041) and seventh all-time in team field goal percentage (.521). Worthy was voted one of the 50 Greatest Players in NBA History in 1996 and named to the NBA 75th Anniversary Team in 2021. To commemorate the NBA's 75th Anniversary The Athletic ranked their top 75 players of all time, and named Worthy as the 59th greatest player in NBA history. Worthy was inducted into the Naismith Memorial Basketball Hall of Fame in 2003. His jersey No. 42 was retired by the Lakers.

== NBA career statistics ==
Legend
GP	Games played	GS	Games started	MPG	Minutes per game
FG%	Field goal percentage	3P%	3-point field goal percentage	FT%	Free throw percentage
RPG	Rebounds per game	APG	Assists per game	SPG	Steals per game
BPG	Blocks per game	PPG	Points per game	**Bold**	Career high
†	Won an NBA championship	*	Led the league

=== Regular season ===
Year	Team	GP	GS	MPG	FG%	3P%	FT%	RPG	APG	SPG	BPG	PPG
1982–83	L.A. Lakers	77	1	25.6	**.579**	.250	.624	5.2	1.7	1.2	.8	13.4
1983–84	L.A. Lakers	**82***	53	29.5	.556	.000	.759	6.3	2.5	.9	.9	14.5
1984–85†	L.A. Lakers	80	76	33.7	.572	.000	.776	**6.4**	2.5	1.1	.8	17.6
1985–86	L.A. Lakers	75	73	32.7	**.579**	.000	.771	5.2	2.7	1.1	**1.0**	20.0
1986–87†	L.A. Lakers	**82***	**82**	34.4	.539	.000	.751	5.7	2.8	1.3	**1.0**	19.4
1987–88†	L.A. Lakers	75	72	35.4	.531	.125	.796	5.0	3.9	1.0	.7	19.7
1988–89	L.A. Lakers	81	81	36.5	.548	.087	.782	6.0	3.6	1.3	.7	20.5
1989–90	L.A. Lakers	80	80	37.0	.548	**.306**	.782	6.0	3.6	1.2	.6	21.1
1990–91	L.A. Lakers	78	74	38.6	.492	.289	.797	4.6	3.5	1.3	.4	**21.4**
1991–92	L.A. Lakers	54	54	**39.0**	.447	.209	**.814**	5.6	**4.7**	**1.4**	.4	19.9
1992–93	L.A. Lakers	**82**	69	28.8	.447	.270	.810	3.0	3.4	1.1	.3	14.9
1993–94	L.A. Lakers	80	2	20.0	.406	.288	.741	2.3	1.9	.6	.2	10.2
Career		926	717	32.4	.521	.241	.769	5.1	3.0	1.1	.7	17.6

=== Playoffs ===
Year	Team	GP	GS	MPG	FG%	3P%	FT%	RPG	APG	SPG	BPG	PPG
1984	L.A. Lakers	21	0	33.7	.599	**.500**	.609	5.0	2.7	1.3	.5	17.7
1985†	L.A. Lakers	19	19	32.9	**.622**	**.500**	.676	5.1	2.2	.9	.7	21.5
1986	L.A. Lakers	14	14	38.5	.558	.000	.681	4.6	3.2	1.1	.7	19.6
1987†	L.A. Lakers	18	18	37.8	.591	.000	.753	5.6	3.5	**1.6**	**1.2**	23.6
1988†	L.A. Lakers	**24**	**24**	37.3	.523	.111	.758	5.8	**4.4**	1.4	.8	21.1
1989	L.A. Lakers	15	15	40.0	.567	.375	.788	**6.7**	2.8	1.2	1.1	**24.8**
1990	L.A. Lakers	9	9	**40.7**	.497	.250	**.837**	5.6	3.0	**1.6**	.3	24.2
1991	L.A. Lakers	18	18	**40.7**	.465	.167	.736	4.1	3.9	1.1	.1	21.1
1993	L.A. Lakers	5	0	29.6	.372	.250	.600	3.4	2.6	1.0	.0	13.8
Career		143	117	37.0	.544	.209	.727	5.2	3.2	1.2	.7	21.1

== Post-NBA ==
=== TV career ===
Worthy is a studio analyst for Spectrum SportsNet and co-host of Access SportsNet, the networks' pregame and postgame show for Lakers game telecasts on in Los Angeles; he also served as an NBA analyst for KCBS-TV in Los Angeles.

Worthy has acted in several television shows. He portrayed the Klingon Koral in the Star Trek: The Next Generation episode "Gambit, Part II". He also guest starred as himself on Everybody Loves Raymond and Webster.

=== Coaching career ===
On September 28, 2015, Worthy was hired to work with the Lakers coaching staff with a focus on the team's big men.

== Personal life ==
Worthy was married for 12 years to Angela Wilder, whom he met in 1981 at the University of North Carolina where she was a cheerleader while he was playing. The couple had two daughters before divorcing in 1996.

In 1985, Worthy received the Order of the Long Leaf Pine.

On November 14, 1990, Worthy was arrested in Houston, and charged with two counts of solicitation of prostitution in a Houston Police Department sting operation. He was sentenced to one year of probation, fined $1,000 and ordered to perform 40 hours of community service.

== Philanthropy ==
Worthy is the founder of the James Worthy Foundation, and dedicates a substantial amount of his time and resources to support non-profit community organizations such as Boys & Girls Clubs, Big Brothers of America, YMCA, and others.

== See also ==
- List of National Basketball Association career playoff scoring leaders
- List of NBA players who have spent their entire career with one franchise
