= Ronnie Lester =

American basketball player (born 1959)

Personal information
- Born: January 1, 1959 (age 67) Canton, Mississippi, U.S.
- Listed height: 6 ft 2 in (1.88 m)
- Listed weight: 175 lb (79 kg)

Career information
- High school: Dunbar (Chicago, Illinois)
- College: Iowa (1976–1980)
- NBA draft: 1980: 1st round, 10th overall pick
- Drafted by: Portland Trail Blazers
- Playing career: 1980–1986
- Position: Point guard
- Number: 12

Career history
- 1980–1984: Chicago Bulls
- 1984–1986: Los Angeles Lakers

Career highlights
- NBA champion (1985); Second-team All-American – AP (1979); Third-team All-American – NABC, UPI (1979); No. 12 retired by Iowa Hawkeyes

Career statistics
- Points: 1,816 (7.3 ppg)
- Rebounds: 473 (1.9 rpg)
- Assists: 1,003 (4.0 apg)
- Stats at NBA.com
- Stats at Basketball Reference
Medals
Representing United States
Men's basketball
Pan American Games
Gold medal – first place	1979 San Juan	Team competition

Ronnie Lester (born January 1, 1959) is an American former professional basketball player and basketball executive. Lester was an NCAA All-American at the University of Iowa, leading Iowa to the 1980 NCAA Final Four. Lester was a member of the 1979 USA Basketball team that won the gold medal in the 1979 Pan-American Games. Lester was the No. 10 overall selection in the first round of the 1980 NBA draft. After an injury-filled career, which included winning an NBA title with the 1985 Los Angeles Lakers, Lester worked as a scout for the Lakers, and eventually became the team's assistant general manager. After 24 years in the Lakers organization, with seven NBA titles, Lester served as a scout for the Phoenix Suns from 2011 to 2015.

== Early life ==
Born in Canton, Mississippi, Lester grew up in a public housing project in Chicago, Illinois. Growing up in the Stateway Gardens housing project near Comiskey Park in Chicago, Lester was raised by his single mother Nadine, along with his with three sisters. Lester attended Dunbar Vocational High School, graduating in 1976.

== High school career ==
Lester started on the varsity team at Dunbar High School of the Chicago Public League as a 5'6" sophomore. In between his sophomore and junior year, Lester grew to 6'2". He averaged ten points and ten assists per game in his junior campaign.

As a senior, Lester averaged 27.0 points per game, playing alongside teammate Ken Dancy, who was a future 1980 NBA draft pick. Lester led the Dunbar Mighty Men to the Chicago Public League Championship playoffs, where they lost 75–60 to Morgan Park High School, with University of Illinois recruit Levi Cobb.

At the beginning of his senior in high school, colleges had shown little interest, until University of Iowa coach Lute Olson and others began seeing his talents during his senior season. Olson was the first to recognize Lester's abilities and began recruiting him.

"As a junior in high school, we had two 20-point scorers. I may have averaged 10 points that season because I needed to get them the ball," Lester said. "The next season those guys had left and I was scoring close to 25 points a game. Iowa was the first school to show a big interest in recruiting me," said Lester.

Lester ultimately chose Iowa after being recruited by Arizona, Creighton, Louisville, Nebraska and Texas-El Paso. Said Lester of Olson and Iowa: "They stuck by me and made me feel I was their number one option."

Every Friday after practice in Iowa City, Olson, accompanied sometimes by his wife Bobbi, would drive to Chicago to visit Lester. "He lived in an area that probably not a lot of people wanted to go into and visit with him and his mom," Olson said in 2015, recalling his recruiting of Lester.

"My recruiting visit felt good (at Iowa)," Lester recalled. "I met all the players that I would be playing with and those guys were really warm and welcoming to me. I knew I had a chance to play as a freshman. I didn't want to go somewhere where I sat and couldn't play the first year."

Lester made a recruiting visit to the University of Arizona "It was after the visit here and he had already made up his mind that (Iowa) is where he wanted to go to school," Olson recalled. "His mom said Ronnie called from Tucson and said 'I don't want to go here, they have funny looking trees.' He was talking about the Saguaro Cactus. I'm glad he didn't like funny-looking trees."

== Collegiate and USA Basketball career (1976–1980) ==
After Basketball Hall of Fame coach Lute Olson recruited him to Iowa, Lester made his presence felt immediately after arriving on campus in Iowa City, Iowa. He started as a freshman and played a key role in Iowa's successes over his four seasons. At Iowa, Lester would earn All-American honors in 1979, First Team All-Big Ten honors in 1978 and 1979, lead the Iowa Hawkeyes to a share of the 1979 Big Ten title and to the Final Four of the 1980 NCAA Men's Division I Basketball Tournament.

Starting for Iowa as a freshman, Lester made an immediate impact, averaging 13.4 points, 3.6 assists and 2.4 rebounds in 1976–1977. Iowa finished 18–9, as Lester was second on the team in scoring, behind Bruce "Sky" King's 21.0 points, and he led the Hawkeyes in assists.

As a sophomore in 1977–1978 Lester averaged 19.9 points, 6.0 assists and 2.5 rebounds, as Iowa finished 12–15 with a young team. Lester joined Magic Johnson, Michigan State; Walter Jordan, Purdue; Mike McGee, Michigan; Kelvin Ransey, Ohio State and Mychal Thompson, Minnesota on the All–Big Ten First Team.

In 1978–1979, Lester averaged 18.7 points, 5.3 assists and 2.3 rebounds as a junior, as Iowa finished 20–8. Iowa captured the Big 10 Championship and advanced to the 40–team 1979 NCAA Division I Basketball Tournament, eventually won by Big Ten rival Michigan State with Magic Johnson over Indiana State with Larry Bird.

Lester was named First Team All–Big 10 for the second consecutive year, along with Joe Barry Carroll, Purdue; Magic Johnson, Michigan State; Greg Kelser, Michigan State; Kelvin Ransey, Ohio State and Mike Woodson, Indiana. Lester was named All–American Second Team (AP) and All-American Third Team (NABC, UPI).

=== Team USA (1979) ===
Lester represented the US as a member of the 1979 Team USA that went 9–0 and won the gold medal in the Pan-American Games. Lester averaged 10.7 points in the tournament, scoring 20 points against the Virgin Islands and 14 against Cuba. The team was coached by Bobby Knight and assistant Mike Krzyzewski. The roster included Hall of Famers in Isiah Thomas, Kevin McHale and Ralph Sampson, as well as Mike Woodson, Kyle Macy, Ray Tolbert, Danny Vranes and Michael Brooks.

=== 1980 Final Four team ===
In 1979–1980, the Iowa team made the 48–team NCAA tournament with an 18–8 record (10–8, 4th in the Big 10), despite playing a good portion of the season without Lester, who suffered a knee injury in the seventh game of the season. Lester averaged 14.8 points and 4.2 assists on the season, in which his talents and subsequent injuries were on display.

Iowa was playing the University of Dayton in the championship game of the Dayton Classic on Dec. 22 with a 7–0 record and won the game, 61–54, but lost Lester for much of the rest of the regular season on a play with 7 minutes remaining in the game.

"It was a play in the open court," Lester recalled of his first knee injury. "There was one guy back on defense, and I was trying to beat him to the basket. I got past him, or even with him, when I pushed off with my leg to put the ball up. I got a little push to my back, and my knee buckled. I was examined on the floor by a physician and he thought I should have surgery. But, when I got back to Iowa City, it was decided otherwise. I came back later, but hurt the knee again in practice, and wound up playing just a few Big Ten games. It was the first time I'd been hurt to the extent that I couldn't play up to my capabilities."

While Lester was sidelined, the Iowa team faced further injuries and adversity. With Lester injured and unable to play, fellow guard Kenny Arnold remained in line–up, playing the entire season with a broken right thumb, while leading the team in total points and assists as a right–handed player. Future NBA player, freshman Bobby Hanson broke a bone in his left hand and played with the injury, while fellow freshman Mark Gannon was lost for most of the season with a knee injury. At the time of his injury, Iowa was undefeated and ranked among the top ten teams in the nation. Aside from players, Iowa lost assistant coach Tony McAndrews who had been severely injured in a plane crash during the season and did not return that season.

Lester's knee improved and he returned for the end of the regular season, with Iowa having lost three of its previous four games. Iowa had been so decimated by injures, the team, which relied mostly on six players in Lester's absence, was labeled the "Fabulous Few." Steve Waite (8.0 points, 5.9 rebounds, 1.0 assists), North Carolina transfer Steve Krafcisin (12.3 points, 6.4 rebounds, 1.6 assists), Vince Brookins (13.5 points, 3.5 rebounds, 4.3 assists) and Kevin Boyle (11.8 points, 6.2 rebounds, 3.1 assists) provided key play, along with Arnold (13.5 points, 3.5 rebounds, 4.3 assists) and Hanson (5.6 points, 2.0 rebounds). Lester led Iowa to victories over Michigan, at Michigan and at the Iowa Fieldhouse over Illinois in the season finale, to leave Iowa with an 18–8 record. Lester's #12 jersey was retired by Iowa in a ceremony at the finale against Illinois.

With an 18–8 record, Iowa received an at–large bid and a #5 seed in the East Regional of the 48–team 1980 NCAA Division I Basketball Tournament. Lester had 17 points and 8 assists as Iowa beat Virginia Commonwealth 86–72 in the opening round. Lester then had 17 points and four assists in just 28 minutes, as Iowa defeated North Carolina State and coach Norm Sloan 77–64 in the sweet sixteen.

In the elite eight, Iowa faced #1 seed Syracuse under coach Jim Boeheim, with Louis Orr and Danny Schayes. With Lester having seven assists and nine points on only 10 shots, Iowa had five other players in double digits as they defeated Syracuse 88–77.

In the East Regional Final against the Georgetown Hoyas, Iowa trailed by as many in 14 points in the second half. However, they came back to defeat Coach John Thompson's squad, led by Sleepy Floyd, 81–80. Lester had eight points and nine assists, taking just seven shots, with his playmaking and distribution helping Iowa to shoot 31 of 51 (60.8%) for the game, along with making 19 of 20 free throws. Iowa won on a dramatic last second basket and free–throw by Steve Waite (15 points) to advance to the Final Four.

In the NCAA National Semi–Final, Lester injured his knee 12 minutes into the game, after scoring 10 of Iowa's first 12 points on 4 for 4 shooting and 2 for 2 from the line. It was his final collegiate play. Lester did not return as Iowa fell to eventual NCAA champion Louisville 80–72. When Olson was asked about Iowa's chances to win the NCAA Tournament had Lester not been injured, "My feeling was yes, I feel we could have won," Olson said. "That was a fun team to coach." Overall, Iowa was 15–1 with Lester fully in the lineup and 8–9 in his absence.

"I would have liked to have played and see what happened, but those things happen," Lester said of his injury in the Final Four.

"We had really high-caliber young men," Olson reflected about the 1980 Final Four team. "We had a great leader in Ronnie, even though he would say about three words a month. It was a high-character group, a group that was really together. It was all about the team, it wasn't about individuals. That's what made them really, really special."

Lester missed half of his senior year during the Final Four season due to an early injury. He described the absence as personally frustrating while noting that the team remained competitive through collective wins and team-oriented play.

=== College summary ===
Even after the continued success Lute Olson enjoyed at the University of Arizona (including four Final Four appearances, a National Championship, with players such as Mike Bibby, Gilbert Arenas, and Jason Terry), Olson regards Lester as the best player he ever coached. Hall of Famer Earvin "Magic" Johnson, who played at Michigan State University, once called Lester the toughest opponent he ever faced in the Big Ten.

“I remember one game in Jenison Fieldhouse,” Johnson added in 1985. “I think Ronnie scored 26 points in the last 20 minutes. It was one of the greatest games I’ve ever seen played. He was definitely tough. I told him that then. He could stop on a dime and shoot a jumper. He was a total, complete basketball player.”

Lester later said that his primary goal during his time at Iowa was to become the best player he could be while contributing to the team’s success. He cited the strength of the Big Ten Conference during that era and emphasized the importance of teamwork in the program’s achievements, including winning a Big Ten championship, qualifying for the NCAA Tournament, and reaching the Final Four.

Overall, Lester finished his 99–game Iowa career with 1675 total points and 480 total assists and averages of 16.9 points, 4.8 assists and 2.3 rebounds, while shooting 47% from the field and 77% from the line.

== NBA career ==
Lester was drafted in the first round of the 1980 NBA draft by the Portland Trail Blazers. He was immediately traded to the Chicago Bulls, where he played four seasons. In 1985 and 1986 Lester was a member of the Los Angeles Lakers, winning an NBA championship in the first of those two seasons. Of his six seasons as a player in the NBA, four were shortened by the recurring knee injury and his minutes were limited.

=== Chicago Bulls (1980–1984) ===
On June 10, 1980, Lester was drafted by the Portland Trail Blazers in the first round (10th pick) of the 1980 NBA draft. Later on draft day, Lester was traded by the Trail Blazers with a 1981 first–round draft pick (Al Wood was later selected) to the Chicago Bulls for Kelvin Ransey and a 1981 first–round draft pick (Darnell Valentine was later selected). The Chicago Bulls had indicated that they wanted Lester before the draft. Other teams were scared off by his knee injury and he dropped down to number 10. The Bulls and general manager Rod Thorn finalized the trade with Portland.

As a rookie in 1980–1981, still recovering from his knee injury suffered in the 1980 NCAA Final Four, Lester underwent knee surgery on November 3, 1980, and the Bulls re–signed veteran Ricky Sobers to replace him in the lineup. Lester returned at the end of the regular season, and played in eight games overall. Lester averaged 3.8 points in 10.4 minutes per game under coach Jerry Sloan, as the Bulls finished 45–37. In the Eastern Conference playoffs, the Bulls defeated the New York Knicks, 2–0, before losing to the eventual 1981 NBA Champion Boston Celtics, 4–0. Against the Knicks, Lester played 8 minutes total in the two games. Lester averaged 4.3 points, 1.5 rebounds and 1.0 assists in the Celtics series.

In 1981–1982, Sloan (19–32) was replaced by general manager Rod Thorn (15–15) as Bulls coach during the season, as Chicago finished 34–48 and Lester had his best professional season. Playing alongside Artis Gilmore, David Greenwood, Reggie Theus, Larry Kenon, Orlando Woolridge and Ricky Sobers, Lester played in 75 games, averaging 11.6 points, 4.8 assists and 2.8 rebounds in 30.0 minutes.

Paul Westhead became coach in 1982–1983 and the Bulls finished 24–58. Lester played in 65 games, averaging 8.1 points, 5.1 assists and 2.6 rebounds in 22.1 minutes.

Under Coach Kevin Loughery, the Bulls finished 27–55 in 1983–1984. Playing in 43 games, with Quintin Dailey, Sidney Green and Ennis Whatley joining the Bulls, Lester averaged 5.4 points, 3.9 assists and 1.1 rebounds in 16.0 minutes per game.

=== Los Angeles Lakers (1984–1986) ===
On November 16, 1984, Lester was waived by the Chicago Bulls. On November 28, 1984, Lester signed as a free agent with the Los Angeles Lakers. Lester would spend the next 24 seasons with the Lakers organization in various capacities, being a part of seven NBA Championships: one as a player, three as a scout, and three as assistant general manager.

In 1984–1985, serving as the backup to Magic Johnson, whom he had played against at Michigan State, Lester averaged 2.8 points and 2.5 assists in 32 games as the Lakers won the NBA Championship. In the 1985 NBA Finals, which the Lakers won 4–2 over the Boston Celtics, Lester played six minutes in two games.

The 1985–1986 season was Lester's last as a player. Lester played in 27 games, averaging 2.5 points, 2.0 assists in 8.2 minutes. The Lakers were defeated by the Houston Rockets in the Western Conference Finals.

On October 2, 1986, the Lakers traded Lester to the Seattle SuperSonics for cash considerations. Lester was waived by the Super Sonics on October 25, 1986.

Overall, in 250 NBA games over five seasons, Lester averaged 7.3 points, 4.0 assists and 1.9 rebounds in 19 minutes per game.

Of his NBA career, Lester said, "Playing in the NBA wasn't fun for me because of the knee. I couldn't play the way I wanted because of the swelling and stiffness in the knee. I just couldn't do the things I did before."

== NBA executive career ==
In the 1987-88 NBA season, Lester began working for the Lakers organization as a scout and later served as the team's assistant general manager through the 2010–2011 season. In 2011, The Lakers gave him the option of signing a one–year contract for the same pay, or a three–year deal at a 30 percent pay cut. Lester did neither.

"I guess I'm just a little disappointed how it all has come to an end," he explained. "I'm not angry at anyone. Probably disappointed more than anything."

"Anytime you move on from something you've been there a long time, there's some sadness to it. But they say change is good too, so we'll see what comes of it."

As a member of the Los Angeles Lakers' front office, he won six NBA championships and 10 Western Conference championships. Lester was the Lakers’ assistant general manager from 2001 to 2011 under general manager Mitch Kupchak, a span in which they won four NBA championships. He previously served as a scout for the Lakers from 1987 to 2001.

Lester was a scout and "master evaluator" for the Phoenix Suns from 2011 to 2015.

== Personal life ==
Lester purchased a condominium for his mother when he first signed with the Chicago Bulls. Later, he purchased an apartment building in which both he and his mother lived.

In 2009, Lester donated $100,000 to the University of Iowa Foundation. He requested that the training room in Carver-Hawkeye Arena be named after longtime (1972–2012) Iowa athletic trainer John Streif. Lester said, “John Streif has been a terrific friend to me for more than 30 years. He has worked tirelessly to support me and numerous other athletes for over four decades now. His dedication to the Hawkeyes is legendary, and I’m honored to name the training room for him."

Said John Streif of Lester: ""He was certainly very well blessed with the physical basketball tools the Lord gave him," Streif said. "He was probably one of the greatest basketball players ever at Iowa, if not the greatest. He was always there, always dependable. He never wanted any recognition. He just operated in a quiet, behind-the-scenes manner. He was friendly not only with me, the trainer, but with the student managers. He still keeps in touch with us."

Streif also noted that Lester was responsible for one of the most emotional experiences of his life. "Ronnie's mother had brought him up in a high-rise near Comiskey Park in Chicago," Streif recalled. "One of the first things he wanted to do when he signed a professional basketball contract was invest in another home for her. He found a condominium and, out of the blue, called me. One day he called to say, 'John, I'm going to move my mom. Do you want to come help?' I did, and I'm not sure I've done a more rewarding thing in athletics. Seeing his mother move to the place Ronnie got for her was a very emotional thing. She was a special lady."

In 2015 and 2016, Lester and Lute Olson returned to the University of Iowa together. In 2016 they watched an Iowa victory over Iowa State and met with the Iowa team, former teammates, fans and media.

In 2017, Lester was named one of the "100 Best Illinois High School Basketball Players Ever" by the Chicago Tribune.

Lester is divorced and has a daughter.

Today, Lester lives in Florida, where he is "semi-retired."

=== Kenny Arnold ===
Over time, Lester, Lute Olson, his Iowa teammates and fans contributed to help Kenny Arnold. Arnold was Iowa's overall leading average scorer and assist leader for the Final Four Iowa squad in 1980. Arnold was first diagnosed with brain cancer in 1985, and his healthcare needs have spanned decades. In 2005, Lester flew to Chicago and drove Arnold to a 25-year reunion event in Iowa City. Later in 2005, Lute Olson arranged for Arnold to be flown to Arizona to be examined and treated at the facilities where Olson's late wife Bobbi had once undergone cancer treatment. Teammates Lester and Mike "Tree" Henry accompanied Arnold on the successful hospital visit. Henry, a fellow Chicago native and Arnold's good friend since college, helped Arnold by overseeing a foundation established to help with Arnold's expenses. Arnold's Iowa basketball "brothers," call themselves "Teammates for Life." In 2017, Lester hosted two separate events for the Kenny Arnold Foundation. Arnold died in April 2019 at the age of 59.

== Career statistics ==
Legend
GP	Games played	GS	Games started	MPG	Minutes per game
FG%	Field goal percentage	3P%	3-point field goal percentage	FT%	Free throw percentage
RPG	Rebounds per game	APG	Assists per game	SPG	Steals per game
BPG	Blocks per game	PPG	Points per game	**Bold**	Career high

=== NBA ===
==== Regular season ====
Year	Team	GP	GS	MPG	FG%	3P%	FT%	RPG	APG	SPG	BPG	PPG
1980–81	Chicago	8	—	10.4	.417	—	**.909**	.8	.9	.3	.0	3.8
1981–82	Chicago	**75**	**74**	**30.0**	**.501**	**.500**	.813	**2.8**	4.8	**1.1**	**.2**	**11.6**
1982–83	Chicago	65	38	22.1	.453	.000	.725	2.6	**5.1**	.8	.1	8.1
1983–84	Chicago	43	3	16.0	.415	.200	.862	1.1	3.9	.7	.1	5.4
1984–85†	L.A. Lakers	32	1	8.7	.415	.000	.677	.8	2.5	.5	.1	2.8
1985–86	L.A. Lakers	27	0	8.2	.500	.000	.789	.4	2.0	.3	.1	2.5
Career		250	116	19.8	.469	.227	.788	1.9	4.0	.7	.1	7.3

==== Playoffs ====
Year	Team	GP	GS	MPG	FG%	3P%	FT%	RPG	APG	SPG	BPG	PPG
1981	Chicago	5		**8.4**	.389	.000	.714	**1.2**	.8	**.4**	.0	**3.8**
1985†	L.A. Lakers	**9**	0	6.0	**.400**	–	**.778**	.9	**1.0**	.0	.0	2.1
Career		14	0	6.9	.394	.000	.750	1.0	.9	.1	.0	2.7

== Honors ==
- In 1980, Lester's #12 was retired by the University of Iowa.
- Lester was inducted into the University of Iowa Athletics Hall of Fame in 1995.
- Lester was inducted into the Des Moines Sunday Register's Iowa Sports Hall of Fame.
