= 1985 NBA Finals =

1985 basketball championship series

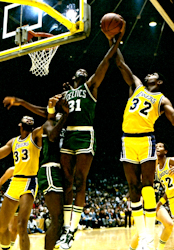
- Los Angeles Lakers star point guard Magic Johnson (No. 32; in gold and purple) dominates small forward Cedric Maxwell (No. 31; in green and white) during a game in the 1985 NBA Finals.
Team	Coach	Wins
Los Angeles Lakers	Pat Riley	4
Boston Celtics	K. C. Jones	2
- Dates: May 27–June 9
- MVP: Kareem Abdul-Jabbar (Los Angeles Lakers)
- Hall of Famers: Celtics: Larry Bird (1998); Dennis Johnson (2010); Kevin McHale (1999); Robert Parish (2003); Lakers: Kareem Abdul-Jabbar (1995); Michael Cooper (2024); Magic Johnson (2002); Bob McAdoo (2000); Jamaal Wilkes (2012); James Worthy (2003); Coaches: K.C. Jones (1989, player); Pat Riley (2008); Officials: Hugh Evans (2022); Darell Garretson (2016); Earl Strom (1995)
- Eastern finals: Celtics defeated 76ers, 4–1
- Western finals: Lakers defeated Nuggets, 4–1

The 1985 NBA World Championship Series was the championship round of the National Basketball Association (NBA)'s 1984–85 season, and the culmination of the season's playoffs. It featured the defending NBA champion and Eastern Conference champion Boston Celtics against the Western Conference champion Los Angeles Lakers.

The Celtics were looking to repeat as NBA champions for the first time since the 1968–69 season. The Celtics had home court advantage for the second year in a row as they finished the regular season with a 63–19 record while the Lakers compiled a 62–20 record. The Lakers looked to bounce back from the previous year's painful loss to the Celtics in the championship series, and were still seeking to beat Boston for the first time ever in NBA Finals history. Also for the first time since 1955, the Finals implemented a 2–3–2 format with Games 1 and 2 in Boston while the next three games were in Los Angeles. The final two games of the series would be played in Boston, if required. This change of format came after David Stern had a conversation with Celtics legend Red Auerbach in 1984, who disliked the frequent traveling between games. The 2–3–2 format would be used until the 2013 NBA Finals, after which the 2–2–1–1–1 format returned in 2014. The 2–3–2 format has long been used by Major League Baseball in the World Series and was also used in the League Championship Series upon changing to a best-of-seven format later that year. The Stanley Cup Final in the National Hockey League also went to a 2–3–2 format that same year as well as the previous year but returned to a 2–2–1–1–1 format from 1986 onward.

With the help of Kareem Abdul-Jabbar and Magic Johnson, the Los Angeles Lakers achieved their first NBA Finals victory over the Boston Celtics in nine meetings, four to two games. The Lakers recovered after losing in a rout in Game 1, dubbed as the "Memorial Day Massacre". The series was the last time the NBA World Championship Series branding would be in use as the NBA Finals branding would replace it for 1986. The video documentary Return to Glory recaps the 1985 NBA playoffs action.

== Background ==
=== Los Angeles Lakers ===
After losing to the Celtics in the previous year's finals, the Lakers entered the 1984–85 NBA season with a mission. Once again using the effective Showtime offense, they ran away with the Western Conference-leading 62 wins. The team as a whole underwent a slight evolution, as James Worthy supplanted Jamaal Wilkes as the starting small forward, while Byron Scott began to earn more minutes as the backup to both Magic Johnson and Michael Cooper.

In the playoffs, the Lakers eliminated the Phoenix Suns, Portland Trail Blazers and Denver Nuggets, going 11–2 in the three playoff rounds.

=== Boston Celtics ===
The Celtics repeated with the NBA's best record by winning 63 games. For the second straight season, Larry Bird won the MVP award, while Kevin McHale won Sixth Man Award for the second year running, despite making the transition from bench cog to starter late in the season with Cedric Maxwell nursing a knee injury. Danny Ainge also emerged as the team's starting shooting guard, after the Celtics traded Gerald Henderson to the Seattle SuperSonics in the offseason.

The Celtics defeated the Cleveland Cavaliers, Detroit Pistons and Philadelphia 76ers, finishing with an 11–4 record heading into the finals. By that point, Boston's classic starting five under head coach K. C. Jones was solidified, featuring Bird, McHale and Robert Parish in the frontcourt, and Ainge and Dennis Johnson in the backcourt. However, Bird and reserve guard Quinn Buckner got into a heated shouting match at Chelsea's in Quincy Market and scuffle with a bartender/bouncer, which allegedly resulted in Bird punching the bartender and injuring his right index finger. Since the fight, Bird struggled in the last few games against the 76ers and in the Finals.

=== Road to the Finals ===
Los Angeles Lakers (Western Conference champion)		Boston Celtics (Eastern Conference champion)
# / Western Conference; # / Team / W / L / PCT / GB; 1 / c-Los Angeles Lakers / 62 / 20 / .756 / –; 2 / y-Denver Nuggets / 52 / 30 / .634 / 10; 3 / x-Houston Rockets / 48 / 34 / .585 / 14; 4 / x-Dallas Mavericks / 44 / 38 / .537 / 18; 5 / x-Portland Trail Blazers / 42 / 40 / .512 / 20; 6 / x-Utah Jazz / 41 / 41 / .500 / 21; 7 / x-San Antonio Spurs / 41 / 41 / .500 / 21; 8 / x-Phoenix Suns / 36 / 46 / .439 / 26; 9 / Seattle SuperSonics / 31 / 51 / .378 / 31; 10 / Los Angeles Clippers / 31 / 51 / .378 / 31; 11 / Kansas City Kings / 31 / 51 / .378 / 31; 12 / Golden State Warriors / 22 / 60 / .268 / 40; 1st seed in the West, 2nd best league record	Regular season	# / Eastern Conference; # / Team / W / L / PCT / GB; 1 / z-Boston Celtics / 63 / 19 / .768 / –; 2 / y-Milwaukee Bucks / 59 / 23 / .720 / 4; 3 / x-Philadelphia 76ers / 58 / 24 / .707 / 5; 4 / x-Detroit Pistons / 46 / 36 / .561 / 17; 5 / x-New Jersey Nets / 42 / 40 / .512 / 21; 6 / x-Washington Bullets / 40 / 42 / .488 / 23; 7 / x-Chicago Bulls / 38 / 44 / .463 / 25; 8 / x-Cleveland Cavaliers / 36 / 46 / .439 / 27; 9 / Atlanta Hawks / 34 / 48 / .415 / 29; 10 / New York Knicks / 24 / 58 / .293 / 39; 11 / Indiana Pacers / 22 / 60 / .268 / 41; 1st seed in the East, best league record
Defeated the (8) Phoenix Suns, 3–0	First round	Defeated the (8) Cleveland Cavaliers, 3–1
Defeated the (5) Portland Trail Blazers, 4–1	Conference semifinals	Defeated the (4) Detroit Pistons, 4–2
Defeated the (2) Denver Nuggets, 4–1	Conference finals	Defeated the (3) Philadelphia 76ers, 4–1

=== Regular season series ===
Both teams split the two meetings, each won by the home team:

January 16, 1985

Los Angeles Lakers 102, Boston Celtics 104

Boston Garden, Boston, Massachusetts

February 17, 1985

Boston Celtics 111, Los Angeles Lakers 117

The Forum, Los Angeles, California

The January 16, 1985 matchup between the two teams came down to the last seconds, as Boston's Kevin McHale hit the game-winner with one second remaining.

== Series summary ==
Game	Date	Road team	Result	Home team
Game 1	May 27	Los Angeles Lakers	114–148 (0–1)	Boston Celtics
Game 2	May 30	Los Angeles Lakers	109–102 (1–1)	Boston Celtics
Game 3	June 2	Boston Celtics	111–136 (1–2)	Los Angeles Lakers
Game 4	June 5	Boston Celtics	107–105 (2–2)	Los Angeles Lakers
Game 5	June 7	Boston Celtics	111–120 (2–3)	Los Angeles Lakers
Game 6	June 9	Los Angeles Lakers	111–100 (4–2)	Boston Celtics

=== Game 1 ===
CBS

May 27
3:30 p.m. EDT

report

Los Angeles Lakers 114, Boston Celtics 148
Scoring by quarter: 24–38, 25–41, 30–29, 35–40
Pts: James Worthy 20; Rebs: Kurt Rambis 9 Asts: Magic Johnson 12	Pts: McHale, Wedman 26 each Rebs: Kevin McHale 9 Asts: Dennis Johnson 10
Boston leads the series, 1–0

Boston Garden, Boston, Massachusetts
Attendance: 14,890
Referees:
- No. 10 Darell Garretson
- No. 20 Jess Kersey

The Celtics defeated the Lakers 148–114. It was dubbed the "Memorial Day Massacre" and a profound embarrassment for the Lakers team. Kareem Abdul-Jabbar had only 12 points and 3 rebounds, while Magic Johnson pulled down only one rebound. Danny Ainge of the Celtics started hot, scoring 15 points in the first quarter. Scott Wedman made all 11 shots he took from the field. Afterwards, Abdul-Jabbar apologized to his teammates for his terrible performance.

Boston led by 30, 79-49 at the half, a record for the largest halftime lead in a Finals game. The 34-point differential set a new record for a Finals game between the Celtics and Lakers in their rivalry. This record would stand until the 2008 NBA Finals, when the Celtics defeated the Lakers in Game 6, 131–92.

=== Game 2 ===
CBS

May 30
9 p.m. EDT

report

Los Angeles Lakers 109, Boston Celtics 102
Scoring by quarter: 31–26, 33–20, 23–29, 22–27
Pts: Kareem Abdul-Jabbar 30; Rebs: Kareem Abdul-Jabbar 17; Asts: Magic Johnson 13	Pts: Larry Bird 30; Rebs: Larry Bird 12; Asts: Dennis Johnson 8
Series tied, 1–1

Boston Garden, Boston, Massachusetts
Attendance: 14,890
Referees:
- No. 11 Jake O'Donnell
- No. 9 John Vanak

The Lakers recovered from the Game 1 loss behind Abdul-Jabbar's 30 points, 17 rebounds, 3 blocks, and 8 assists. Lakers swingman Michael Cooper finished with 22 points on an 8 for 9 shooting performance, including several clutch outside jumpers down the stretch. The series was evened at 1–1.

=== Game 3 ===
CBS

June 2
12:30 p.m. PDT

report

Boston Celtics 111, Los Angeles Lakers 136
Scoring by quarter: 29–25, 30–40, 26–35, 26–36
Pts: Kevin McHale 31; Rebs: Kevin McHale 10; Asts: Danny Ainge 10	Pts: James Worthy 29; Rebs: Kareem Abdul-Jabbar 14; Asts: Magic Johnson 16
Los Angeles leads the series, 2–1

The Forum, Inglewood, California
Attendance: 17,505
Referees:
- No. 25 Hugh Evans
- No. 12 Earl Strom

The Celtics held a 48–38 lead in the second quarter before the Lakers rallied and led, 65–59, at halftime. The Lakers pulled away in the second half and won the game 136–111. Abdul-Jabbar scored his 4,456th career point and became the league's all-time leading playoff scorer, which had previously been held by Lakers guard Jerry West. Larry Bird's shooting slump from game 2 continued. He shot a combined 17 of 42 from the field in games two and three. James Worthy led the Lakers with 29 points.

=== Game 4 ===
CBS

June 5
6 p.m. PDT

report

Boston Celtics 107, Los Angeles Lakers 105
Scoring by quarter: 28–32, 31–26, 23–26, 25–21
Pts: Kevin McHale 28; Rebs: Kevin McHale 12; Asts: Dennis Johnson 12	Pts: Kareem Abdul-Jabbar 21; Rebs: Magic Johnson 11; Asts: Magic Johnson 12
Series tied, 2–2

The Forum, Inglewood, California
Attendance: 17,505
Referees:
- No. 4 Ed T. Rush
- No. 9 John Vanak

The Celtics tied the series in the fourth game with a 107–105 win with a buzzer-beating jumper by Dennis Johnson, who scored 27 points. Kevin McHale led all players with 28 points to go along with 12 rebounds for the Celtics.

=== Game 5 ===
CBS

June 7
6 p.m. PDT

report

Boston Celtics 111, Los Angeles Lakers 120
Scoring by quarter: 31–35, 20–29, 30–31, 30–25
Pts: Robert Parish 26; Rebs: Kevin McHale 10; Asts: Dennis Johnson 17	Pts: Kareem Abdul-Jabbar 36; Rebs: Kurt Rambis 9 Asts: Magic Johnson 17
Los Angeles leads the series, 3–2

The Forum, Inglewood, California
Attendance: 17,505
Referees:
- No. 10 Darell Garretson
- No. 11 Jake O'Donnell

In this game, the Lakers stomped out the Celtics by jumping out to a 64–51 lead and stretched it to 89–72 before the Celtics cut the deficit to 4 points, late in the 4th quarter. The Celtics would cut the lead to 4 points several times, but the Lakers answered each time. Magic Johnson made three shots, Kareem added four more shots, and Cooper hit 2 outside jumpers, and the Lakers came away with a 120–111 victory to take a 3–2 series lead.

=== Game 6 ===
CBS

June 9
1 p.m. EDT

report

Los Angeles Lakers 111, Boston Celtics 100
Scoring by quarter: 28–26, 27–29, 27–18, 29–27
Pts: Kareem Abdul-Jabbar 29; Rebs: Johnson, Rambis 10 each Asts: Magic Johnson 14	Pts: Kevin McHale 32; Rebs: Kevin McHale 16; Asts: Danny Ainge 11
Los Angeles wins the series, 4–2

Boston Garden, Boston, Massachusetts
Attendance: 14,890
Referees:
- No. 25 Hugh Evans
- No. 12 Earl Strom

In the series clincher, the game was tied at halftime. The Lakers would hold the Celtics to just 18 third quarter points to pull away. Abdul-Jabbar scored 29 points and James Worthy scored 28 of his own, as Los Angeles became the first road team to clinch a title at the Boston Garden. Magic Johnson dished out a game-high 14 assists. Celtics' forward Kevin McHale scored 32 points and grabbed 16 rebounds—both game-highs—before fouling out in the fourth quarter. Larry Bird's dismal shooting continued as he hit just 12 of 29 shots.

The 38-year-old Abdul-Jabbar was named MVP of the series, his second Finals MVP award and first since 1971 (back when he was known as Lew Alcindor), averaging 25.7 points, 9.0 rebounds, 5.2 assists and 1.5 blocks in six games. Worthy averaged 23.7 points for the Lakers, while Magic Johnson scored 18.3 points per game to go along with 14.0 assists and 6.8 rebounds. Los Angeles shot 51.2% as a team for the series.

McHale led Boston in scoring (26.0) and rebounding (10.7) while shooting 59.8% from the floor. Bird averaged 23.8 points and 8.8 rebounds on just 44.9% shooting. Celtics' guard Dennis Johnson led both teams in minutes played (247). Boston shot 47.6% from the floor while out-rebounding Los Angeles 259–256.

It was the first time (and only time until 2022) in NBA Finals history where the other team clinched the championship against the Celtics in Boston. It was also only the Celtics' second Finals series defeat, having previously lost to the St. Louis Hawks in 1958.

== Player statistics ==
Legend
GP	Games played	GS	Games started	MPG	Minutes per game
FG%	Field-goal percentage	3P%	3-point field-goal percentage	FT%	Free-throw percentage
RPG	Rebounds per game	APG	Assists per game	SPG	Steals per game
BPG	Blocks per game	PPG	Points per game

Los Angeles Lakers

Los Angeles Lakers statistics
Player	GP	GS	MPG	FG%	3P%	FT%	RPG	APG	SPG	BPG	PPG
Kareem Abdul-Jabbar	6	6	35.5	.604	.000	.769	9.0	5.2	1.0	1.5	25.7
Michael Cooper	6	0	25.5	.588	.286	.905	2.0	3.7	1.2	0.3	10.2
Magic Johnson	6	6	39.2	.494	.500	.871	6.8	14.0	2.2	0.0	18.3
Mitch Kupchak	6	0	14.5	.550	.000	.643	3.3	0.7	0.2	0.2	5.2
Ronnie Lester	2	0	3.0	.000	.000	1.000	0.0	0.5	0.0	0.0	1.0
Bob McAdoo	6	0	19.5	.379	.000	.714	3.0	0.8	0.0	0.5	8.2
Mike McGee	4	0	6.5	.500	.600	.667	1.0	0.5	0.0	0.0	4.8
Chuck Nevitt	1	0	2.0	.000	.000	.500	0.0	0.0	1.0	1.0	1.0
Kurt Rambis	6	6	22.0	.500	.000	.538	8.5	0.8	1.3	0.5	7.5
Byron Scott	6	6	34.7	.395	.286	.556	3.7	2.2	2.5	0.2	11.2
Larry Spriggs	4	0	6.8	.600	.000	.500	1.8	1.5	0.3	0.3	3.5
James Worthy	6	6	39.0	.564	.000	.700	4.5	3.2	0.5	0.5	23.7

Boston Celtics

Boston Celtics statistics
Player	GP	GS	MPG	FG%	3P%	FT%	RPG	APG	SPG	BPG	PPG
Danny Ainge	6	6	33.8	.414	.400	.750	3.0	7.0	2.0	0.0	11.0
Larry Bird	6	6	40.2	.449	.333	.850	8.8	5.0	1.8	0.7	23.8
Quinn Buckner	4	0	7.8	.545	.000	.000	1.5	2.0	0.3	0.0	3.0
M. L. Carr	3	0	2.7	.375	1.000	.000	0.3	0.0	0.0	0.0	2.3
Carlos Clark	2	0	3.5	.500	.000	1.000	0.5	1.5	0.5	0.0	2.0
Dennis Johnson	6	6	41.2	.382	.000	.857	4.3	9.5	1.7	0.7	16.0
Greg Kite	5	0	8.8	.444	.000	.500	2.0	0.6	0.2	0.0	1.8
Cedric Maxwell	5	0	10.8	.500	.000	.700	1.0	0.2	0.4	0.0	2.6
Kevin McHale	6	6	40.0	.598	.000	.727	10.7	1.3	0.3	1.8	26.0
Robert Parish	6	6	37.2	.481	.000	.771	9.0	2.0	1.0	1.8	17.2
Scott Wedman	6	0	17.5	.611	.636	.556	3.3	1.7	0.8	0.0	9.3
Ray Williams	4	0	9.3	.500	.000	.000	0.3	2.8	0.3	0.0	3.5

== Team rosters ==
=== Los Angeles Lakers ===
1984–85 Los Angeles Lakers roster
Players

Pos.	No.	Player	Height	Weight	DOB	From
C	33	Kareem Abdul-Jabbar	7 ft 2 in (2.18 m)	225 lb (102 kg)	1947–04–16	UCLA
SG	21	Michael Cooper	6 ft 5 in (1.96 m)	170 lb (77 kg)	1956–04–15	New Mexico
PG	32	Magic Johnson	6 ft 9 in (2.06 m)	215 lb (98 kg)	1959–08–14	Michigan State
C	1	Earl Jones	7 ft 0 in (2.13 m)	210 lb (95 kg)	1961–01–13	UDC
PF	25	Mitch Kupchak	6 ft 9 in (2.06 m)	230 lb (104 kg)	1954–05–24	North Carolina
PG	12	Ronnie Lester	6 ft 2 in (1.88 m)	175 lb (79 kg)	1959–01–01	Iowa
C	11	Bob McAdoo	6 ft 9 in (2.06 m)	210 lb (95 kg)	1951–09–25	North Carolina
SF	40	Mike McGee	6 ft 5 in (1.96 m)	190 lb (86 kg)	1959–07–29	Michigan
C	43	Chuck Nevitt	7 ft 5 in (2.26 m)	217 lb (98 kg)	1959–06–13	NC State
PF	31	Kurt Rambis	6 ft 8 in (2.03 m)	213 lb (97 kg)	1958–02–25	Santa Clara
SG	4	Byron Scott	6 ft 3 in (1.91 m)	195 lb (88 kg)	1961–03–28	Arizona State
PF	35	Larry Spriggs	6 ft 7 in (2.01 m)	230 lb (104 kg)	1959–09–08	Howard
SF	52	Jamaal Wilkes	6 ft 6 in (1.98 m)	190 lb (86 kg)	1953–05–02	UCLA
SF	42	James Worthy	6 ft 9 in (2.06 m)	225 lb (102 kg)	1961–02–27	North Carolina

Coaches
Head coach
- Pat Riley
Assistant(s)
- Bill Bertka
- Dave Wohl

Legend
- (DP) Unsigned draft pick
- (FA) Free agent
- (S) Suspended
- Injured

=== Boston Celtics ===
1984–85 Boston Celtics roster
Players

Pos.	No.	Player	Height	Weight	DOB	From
G/F	44	Danny Ainge	6 ft 4 in (1.93 m)	175 lb (79 kg)	1959–03–17	BYU
F	33	Larry Bird	6 ft 9 in (2.06 m)	220 lb (100 kg)	1956–12–07	Indiana State
G	28	Quinn Buckner	6 ft 3 in (1.91 m)	190 lb (86 kg)	1954–08–20	Indiana
G	34	Rick Carlisle	6 ft 5 in (1.96 m)	210 lb (95 kg)	1959–10–27	Virginia
G/F	30	M.L. Carr	6 ft 6 in (1.98 m)	205 lb (93 kg)	1951–01–09	Guilford
G	40	Carlos Clark	6 ft 4 in (1.93 m)	210 lb (95 kg)	1960–08–10	Mississippi
G	3	Dennis Johnson	6 ft 4 in (1.93 m)	185 lb (84 kg)	1954–09–18	Pepperdine
C	50	Greg Kite	6 ft 11 in (2.11 m)	250 lb (113 kg)	1961–08–05	BYU
F	31	Cedric Maxwell	6 ft 8 in (2.03 m)	205 lb (93 kg)	1955–11–21	Charlotte
F/C	32	Kevin McHale	6 ft 10 in (2.08 m)	210 lb (95 kg)	1957–12–19	Minnesota
C	00	Robert Parish	7 ft 0 in (2.13 m)	230 lb (104 kg)	1953–08–30	Centenary
G/F	8	Scott Wedman	6 ft 7 in (2.01 m)	215 lb (98 kg)	1952–07–29	Colorado
G	20	Ray Williams	6 ft 3 in (1.91 m)	188 lb (85 kg)	1954–10–14	Minnesota

Coaches
Head coach
- K.C. Jones
Assistant(s)
- Jimmy Rodgers
- Chris Ford

Legend
- (DP) Unsigned draft pick
- (FA) Free agent
- (S) Suspended
- Injured

== Television coverage ==
The Finals were telecast by CBS in the United States, with its coverage anchored by Brent Musburger. Dick Stockton did play-by-play with Tom Heinsohn as color analyst, working their second Finals together. Pat O'Brien worked sideline duties for both teams.

== Celebration ==
The Lakers were invited to a reception at the White House with President Ronald Reagan, where Kareem Abdul-Jabbar presented the President with a jersey. The following Tuesday would be declared "Laker Day" by Los Angeles Mayor Tom Bradley with a parade beginning at 9th in Broadway.

== Aftermath ==
Kareem Abdul Jabbar holding a personalized President Ronald Reagan Lakers' jersey at the team's White House visit

In the postgame presentation of the Larry O'Brien trophy, Lakers owner Jerry Buss exclaimed, "this has removed the most odious sentence in the English language. It can never again be said that the Lakers have never beaten the Celtics!".

After appearing in and winning both the 1981 and 1984 NBA Finals, this finals championship marked the first loss for the Larry Bird-era Celtics, the first Finals loss to the Lakers in the history of the rivalry, and the Celtics' first finals loss since 1958. Boston would appear in two more NBA Finals before the decade was over, winning it all the next year against the Hakeem Olajuwon-led Houston Rockets in six games, only to lose in a rematch to the Lakers in 1987.

Footage of the Lakers' locker room celebration after the Finals was later used in the sports blooper-laden music video for "Walk of Life" by Dire Straits, released later that year.

== See also ==
- 1985 NBA playoffs
