= Earl Jones (basketball) =

American basketball player (born 1961)

Personal information
- Born: January 13, 1961 (age 65) Oak Hill, West Virginia, U.S.
- Listed height: 7 ft 0 in (2.13 m)
- Listed weight: 210 lb (95 kg)

Career information
- High school: Mount Hope (Mount Hope, West Virginia); Spingarn (Washington, D.C.)
- College: District of Columbia (1980–1984)
- NBA draft: 1984: 1st round, 23rd overall pick
- Drafted by: Los Angeles Lakers
- Playing career: 1984–1995
- Position: Center
- Number: 1, 31

Career history
- 1984–1985: Los Angeles Lakers
- 1985–1986: Kansas City Sizzlers
- 1986: Milwaukee Bucks
- 1986–1987: Stefanel Trieste
- 1987–1988: Olympique Antibes
- 1988–1989: Joventut Badalona
- 1994–1995: Rockford Lightning

Career highlights
- NBA champion (1985); 2× NABC Division II Player of the Year (1983, 1984); NCAA Division II champion (1982); McDonald's All-American (1980); Bill Evans Award (1979); 3× First-team Parade All-American (1978–1980)
- Stats at NBA.com
- Stats at Basketball Reference
Medals
Representing United States
World Championships
Silver medal – second place	1982 Colombia	USA

Earl Amasa Jones (born January 13, 1961) is an American former professional basketball player. He was a member of the Los Angeles Lakers and Milwaukee Bucks.

== Early years ==
Jones attended Mount Hope High School for three seasons, where he led the school to 63 wins in 72 games and the 1978 West Virginia Class AA championship game, while he averaged 28 points. But he struggled outside of the basketball court and at one point as a junior, missed 63 consecutive days of school.

As a senior, he was convinced by William Robinson (who had become his legal guardian), to transfer to Spingarn High School, where he had to go through a legal process over his eligibility.

He averaged 20 points and 15 rebounds per game, while leading the team to a city championship. He was considered an elite basketball prospect and one of the best players in the nation, but his low grades (2.1 grade average) limited the offers he received from NCAA Division I schools.

== College career ==
Jones enrolled at Division II University of the District of Columbia, where Robinson was named an assistant coach. As a sophomore in 1982, he led the school to the National Collegiate Athletic Associate Division II Championship.

He was a three-time Division II All-American and a two-time NCAA Division II Player of the Year, with a career scoring average of 21.7 points. He represented the United States in the World Games.

== Professional career ==
Entering the 1984 NBA draft, he was considered a risk, because of his small school experience, his underdeveloped body and his reputation as an underachiever. He was selected by the Los Angeles Lakers with the 23rd pick in the 1st round of the 1984 NBA draft.

As a rookie, he was limited by injuries, including a fractured right foot. He appeared in only two games for a total of seven minutes and took only one shot. On October 9, 1985, he was traded to the San Antonio Spurs in exchange for "future considerations". On October 22, he was waived.

In 1985, he played for the Kansas City Sizzlers of the Continental Basketball Association. On January 13, 1986, he signed a 10-day contract with the Milwaukee Bucks. On January 23, he signed a second 10-day contract.

In 1995, he signed with the Rockford Lightning of the Continental Basketball Association.

== Career statistics ==
Legend
GP	Games played	GS	Games started	MPG	Minutes per game
FG%	Field goal percentage	3P%	3-point field goal percentage	FT%	Free throw percentage
RPG	Rebounds per game	APG	Assists per game	SPG	Steals per game
BPG	Blocks per game	PPG	Points per game	**Bold**	Career high

=== NBA ===
==== Regular season ====
Year	Team	GP	GS	MPG	FG%	3P%	FT%	RPG	APG	SPG	BPG	PPG
1984–85	L.A. Lakers	2	0	3.5	.000	–	–	.0	.0	.0	.0	.0
1985–86	Milwaukee	**12**	0	**3.6**	**.417**	–	**.750**	**8**	**.3**	.0	**.1**	**1.1**
Career		14	0	3.6	.385	–	.750	.7	.3	.0	.1	.9
