= 1984–85 Los Angeles Lakers season =

Pro basketball team season (won NBA championship)

- NBA champions
- Conference champions
- Division champions
- Head coach: Pat Riley
- General manager: Jerry West
- Owner: Jerry Buss
- Arena: The Forum

Results
- Record: 62–20 (.756)
- Place: Division: 1st (Pacific); Conference: 1st (Western)
- Playoff finish: NBA champions (Defeated Celtics 4–2)
- Stats at Basketball Reference

Local media
- Television: KHJ-TV (Chick Hearn, Keith Erickson)
- Radio: KLAC (Chick Hearn, Keith Erickson)

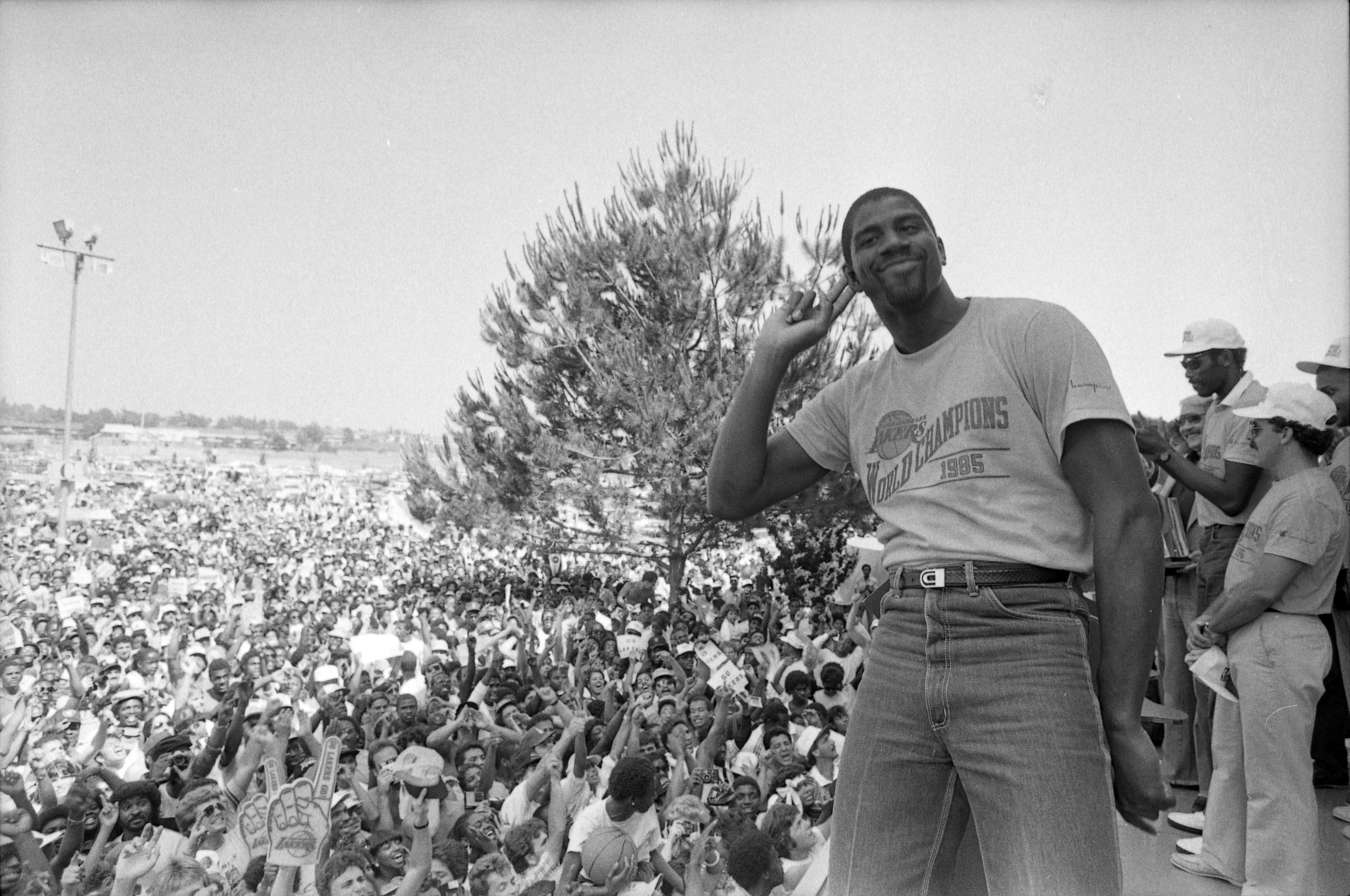
Magic Johnson at the championship rally, June 1985

The 1984–85 Los Angeles Lakers season was the 39th season of the franchise, 37th in the National Basketball Association (NBA) and 25th in Los Angeles. The Lakers entered the season as runner-ups of the 1984 NBA Finals, where they lost in heartbreaking fashion to the Boston Celtics in seven games, increasing their losing streak to the Celtics in the NBA Finals to 8 consecutive losses.

In the playoffs, the Lakers swept the Phoenix Suns in three games in the First Round, then defeated the Portland Trail Blazers in five games in the Semifinals, before defeating the Denver Nuggets in five games in the Conference Finals to advance to the NBA Finals for the fifth time in the 1980s, facing off against the defending NBA champion Boston Celtics in a rematch of last season's NBA Finals. This time, however, the Lakers were able to return to their championship ways and win their ninth NBA championship (their fourth in Los Angeles), avenging their NBA Finals loss and getting revenge on the Celtics, defeating them in six games, and marking the first time the Lakers had defeated the Celtics in the NBA Finals. The Lakers also became the first team to have defeated the Celtics in the NBA Finals while on the road, a feat that has since only been accomplished one other time by the Golden State Warriors in 2022. In 2024, HoopsHype would rank this squad as the team with the 22nd-easiest route to the NBA Finals championship (ahead of that year's Boston Celtics squad in terms of higher combined winning percentage of their opponents), with their first two opponents docking the overall percentage from the season there.

== NBA draft ==
| Round | Pick | Player | Position | Nationality | School/Club team |
|---|---|---|---|---|---|
| 1 | 23 | Earl Jones | Center | United States | District of Columbia |

== Transactions ==
The Lakers have been involved in the following transactions during the 1984–1985 season.

=== Free Agent Additions ===
| Player | Former team |
| Chuck Nevitt | Houston Rockets |
| Ronnie Lester | Chicago Bulls |

== Roster ==
1984–85 Los Angeles Lakers roster
Players

| Pos. | No. | Player | Height | Weight | DOB | From |
|---|---|---|---|---|---|---|
| C | 33 | Kareem Abdul-Jabbar | 7 ft 2 in (2.18 m) | 225 lb (102 kg) | 1947-04-16 | UCLA |
| SG | 21 | Michael Cooper | 6 ft 5 in (1.96 m) | 170 lb (77 kg) | 1956-04-15 | New Mexico |
| PG | 32 | Magic Johnson | 6 ft 9 in (2.06 m) | 215 lb (98 kg) | 1959-08-14 | Michigan State |
| C | 1 | Earl Jones | 7 ft 0 in (2.13 m) | 210 lb (95 kg) | 1961-01-13 | Columbia |
| PF | 25 | Mitch Kupchak | 6 ft 9 in (2.06 m) | 230 lb (104 kg) | 1954-05-24 | North Carolina |
| PG | 12 | Ronnie Lester | 6 ft 2 in (1.88 m) | 175 lb (79 kg) | 1959-01-01 | Iowa |
| C | 11 | Bob McAdoo | 6 ft 9 in (2.06 m) | 210 lb (95 kg) | 1951-09-25 | North Carolina |
| SF | 40 | Mike McGee | 6 ft 5 in (1.96 m) | 190 lb (86 kg) | 1959-07-29 | Michigan |
| C | 43 | Chuck Nevitt | 7 ft 5 in (2.26 m) | 217 lb (98 kg) | 1959-06-13 | NC State |
| PF | 31 | Kurt Rambis | 6 ft 8 in (2.03 m) | 213 lb (97 kg) | 1958-02-25 | Santa Clara |
| SG | 4 | Byron Scott | 6 ft 3 in (1.91 m) | 195 lb (88 kg) | 1961-03-28 | Arizona State |
| PF | 35 | Larry Spriggs | 6 ft 7 in (2.01 m) | 230 lb (104 kg) | 1959-09-08 | Howard |
| SF | 52 | Jamaal Wilkes | 6 ft 6 in (1.98 m) | 190 lb (86 kg) | 1953-05-02 | UCLA |
| SF | 42 | James Worthy | 6 ft 9 in (2.06 m) | 225 lb (102 kg) | 1961-02-27 | North Carolina |

Coaches
Head coach
- Pat Riley
Assistant(s)
- Bill Bertka
- Dave Wohl
- Gary Vitti (trainer)

Legend
- (DP) Unsigned draft pick
- (FA) Free agent
- (S) Suspended
- Injured

Roster
Updated: March 5, 1985

== Regular season ==
=== Season standings ===
| Pacific Division | W | L | PCT | GB | Home | Road | Div |
|---|---|---|---|---|---|---|---|
| y-Los Angeles Lakers | 62 | 20 | .756 | – | 36–5 | 26–15 | 18–12 |
| x-Portland Trail Blazers | 42 | 40 | .512 | 20 | 33–8 | 15–26 | 17–13 |
| x-Phoenix Suns | 36 | 46 | .439 | 26 | 32–9 | 10–31 | 14–16 |
| Seattle SuperSonics | 31 | 51 | .378 | 31 | 31–10 | 10–31 | 16–14 |
| Los Angeles Clippers | 31 | 51 | .378 | 31 | 27–14 | 10–31 | 13–17 |
| Golden State Warriors | 22 | 60 | .268 | 40 | 25–16 | 5–36 | 12–18 |

| # | Western Conference | | | | |
| # | Team | W | L | PCT | GB |
|---|---|---|---|---|---|
| 1 | c-Los Angeles Lakers | 62 | 20 | .756 | – |
| 2 | y-Denver Nuggets | 52 | 30 | .634 | 10 |
| 3 | x-Houston Rockets | 48 | 34 | .585 | 14 |
| 4 | x-Dallas Mavericks | 44 | 38 | .537 | 18 |
| 5 | x-Portland Trail Blazers | 42 | 40 | .512 | 20 |
| 6 | x-Utah Jazz | 41 | 41 | .500 | 21 |
| 7 | x-San Antonio Spurs | 41 | 41 | .500 | 21 |
| 8 | x-Phoenix Suns | 36 | 46 | .439 | 26 |
| 9 | Seattle SuperSonics | 31 | 51 | .378 | 31 |
| 10 | Los Angeles Clippers | 31 | 51 | .378 | 31 |
| 11 | Kansas City Kings | 31 | 51 | .378 | 31 |
| 12 | Golden State Warriors | 22 | 60 | .268 | 40 |

== Game log ==
=== Regular season ===
1984–85 game log
Total: 62–20 (Home: 36–5; Road: 26–15)
October: 1–2 (home: 1–0; road: 0–2)

| Game | Date | Team | Score | High points | High rebounds | High assists | Location Attendance | Record |
|---|---|---|---|---|---|---|---|---|
| 1 | October 27; 5:30 p.m. PDT | @ San Antonio | L 112–113 | Magic Johnson (32) | McAdoo & Worthy (8) | Magic Johnson (8) | HemisFair Arena; 13,506 | 0–1 |
| 2 | October 28; 5:00 p.m. PST | @ Dallas | L 96–107 | Kareem Abdul-Jabbar (20) | Kareem Abdul-Jabbar (9) | Kareem Abdul-Jabbar (6) | Reunion Arena; 17,007 | 0–2 |
| 3 | October 30; 7:30 p.m. PST | Golden State | W 144-110 | McGee & Scott (26) | Magic Johnson (12) | Magic Johnson (10) | The Forum; 11,545 | 1–2 |

November: 11–4 (home: 7–2; road: 4–2)

| Game | Date | Team | Score | High points | High rebounds | High assists | Location Attendance | Record |
|---|---|---|---|---|---|---|---|---|
| 4 | November 1; 7:30 p.m. PST | @ Seattle | L 103-105 | Kareem Abdul-Jabbar (24) | Magic Johnson (10) | Magic Johnson (14) | Kingdome; 7,020 | 1–3 |
| 5 | November 2; 7:30 p.m. PST | San Antonio | W 119–100 | Mike McGee (21) | Kareem Abdul-Jabbar (8) | Magic Johnson (11) | The Forum; 13,550 | 2–3 |
| 6 | November 4; 7:30 p.m. PST | Portland | W 124–116 | Kareem Abdul-Jabbar (25) | James Worthy (14) | Magic Johnson (11) | The Forum; 14,148 | 3–3 |
| 7 | November 6; 7:30 p.m. PST | Denver | L 130–146 | Magic Johnson (19) | Mike McGee (8) | Magic Johnson (8) | The Forum; 11,272 | 3–4 |
| 8 | November 8; 7:30 p.m. PST | @ Golden State | L 106-122 | Abdul-Jabbar & Johnson (20) | Magic Johnson (9) | Magic Johnson (12) | Oakland-Alameda County Coliseum; 10,523 | 3–5 |
| 9 | November 9; 7:30 p.m. PST | @ Portland | W 130–126 | Byron Scott (27) | Abdul-Jabbar & Worthy (7) | Magic Johnson (15) | Memorial Coliseum; 12,666 | 4–5 |
| 10 | November 11; 7:30 p.m. PST | New Jersey | W 121–111 | James Worthy (22) | James Worthy (9) | Magic Johnson (12) | The Forum; 13,257 | 5–5 |
| 11 | November 16 | Kansas City | W 128-116 | Kareem Abdul-Jabbar (30) | Kurt Rambis (10) | Magic Johnson (11) | The Forum; 13,287 | 6–5 |
| 12 | November 18; 7:30 p.m. PST | Milwaukee | W 96–89 | James Worthy (24) | Michael Cooper (8) | Magic Johnson (11) | The Forum; 12,768 | 7–5 |
| 13 | November 20; 7:30 p.m. PST | Phoenix | W 130–108 | Magic Johnson (29) | James Worthy (9) | Johnson & Scott (10) | The Forum; 13,792 | 8–5 |
| 14 | November 21; 6:30 p.m. PST | @ Phoenix | W 102–97 | Byron Scott (21) | James Worthy (12) | Magic Johnson (8) | Arizona Veterans Memorial Coliseum; 12,671 | 9–5 |
| 15 | November 24 | @ L.A. Clippers | W 108-103 | James Worthy (27) | Kareem Abdul-Jabbar (11) | Magic Johnson (14) | Los Angeles Memorial Sports Arena; 14,991 | 10–5 |
| 16 | November 25; 7:30 p.m. PST | Seattle | L 94-105 | Kareem Abdul-Jabbar (23) | Kareem Abdul-Jabbar (14) | Michael Cooper (7) | The Forum; 12,270 | 10–6 |
| 17 | November 28; 6:30 p.m. PST | @ Utah | W 114–109 | Kareem Abdul-Jabbar (24) | James Worthy (17) | Magic Johnson (14) | Salt Palace; 11,331 | 11–6 |
| 18 | November 30 | Kansas City | W 130-121 | Kareem Abdul-Jabbar (18) | James Worthy (8) | Magic Johnson (13) | The Forum; 12,766 | 12–6 |

December: 10–4 (home: 5–1; road: 5–3)

| Game | Date | Team | Score | High points | High rebounds | High assists | Location Attendance | Record |
|---|---|---|---|---|---|---|---|---|
| 19 | December 2; 7:30 p.m. PST | Chicago | L 112–113 | Kareem Abdul-Jabbar (32) | Johnson & Rambis (7) | Magic Johnson (16) | The Forum; 15,505 | 12–7 |
| 20 | December 4; 4:30 p.m. PST | @ Cleveland | W 116–112 | Kareem Abdul-Jabbar (31) | Kareem Abdul-Jabbar (13) | Magic Johnson (14) | Richfield Coliseum; 11,298 | 13–7 |
| 21 | December 5; 4:30 p.m. PST | @ New Jersey | W 104–93 | Kareem Abdul-Jabbar (20) | Abdul-Jabbar & Johnson (6) | Magic Johnson (9) | Brendan Byrne Arena; 14,532 | 14–7 |
| 22 | December 7; 5:00 p.m. PST | @ Philadelphia | L 116–122 | Kareem Abdul-Jabbar (24) | James Worthy (10) | Magic Johnson (17) | The Spectrum; 17,921 | 14–8 |
| 23 | December 8; 4:30 p.m. PST | @ Washington | L 98–101 | Magic Johnson (23) | Abdul-Jabbar & Worthy (9) | Magic Johnson (12) | Capital Centre; 19,105 | 14–9 |
| 24 | December 12; 7:30 p.m. PST | Golden State | W 131-107 | Mike McGee (17) | Kurt Rambis (13) | Magic Johnson (10) | The Forum; 12,476 | 15–9 |
| 25 | December 13; 7:30 p.m. PST | @ Seattle | L 122-124 (OT) | Kareem Abdul-Jabbar (34) | James Worthy (16) | Magic Johnson (15) | Kingdome; 8,491 | 15–10 |
| 26 | December 16; 7:30 p.m. PST | Washington | W 109–101 | James Worthy (26) | James Worthy (11) | Magic Johnson (18) | The Forum; 15,070 | 16–10 |
| 27 | December 18; 4:30 p.m. PST | @ Atlanta | W 117–116 | Magic Johnson (25) | Magic Johnson (14) | Magic Johnson (20) | Omni Coliseum; 9,844 | 17–10 |
| 28 | December 19; 5:00 p.m. PST | @ Houston | W 123–116 | Kareem Abdul-Jabbar (32) | Kurt Rambis (8) | Magic Johnson (20) | The Summit; 16,016 | 18–10 |
| 29 | December 21; 7:30 p.m. PST | Phoenix | W 119–105 | James Worthy (30) | James Worthy (14) | Magic Johnson (12) | The Forum; 14,764 | 19–10 |
| 30 | December 26; 7:30 p.m. PST | Seattle | W 101-97 | Kareem Abdul-Jabbar (24) | Kareem Abdul-Jabbar (9) | Magic Johnson (10) | The Forum; 15,582 | 20–10 |
| 31 | December 28; 6:30 p.m. PST | @ Denver | W 135–123 | Kareem Abdul-Jabbar (33) | Magic Johnson (11) | Magic Johnson (14) | McNichols Sports Arena; 17,022 | 21–10 |
| 32 | December 29 | L.A. Clippers | W 113-107 | James Worthy (25) | Magic Johnson (10) | Magic Johnson (16) | The Forum; 17,505 | 22–10 |

January: 9–6 (home: 6–2; road: 3–4)

| Game | Date | Team | Score | High points | High rebounds | High assists | Location Attendance | Record |
|---|---|---|---|---|---|---|---|---|
| 33 | January 4; 7:30 p.m. PST | Portland | W 120–95 | Kareem Abdul-Jabbar (28) | Kareem Abdul-Jabbar (11) | Michael Cooper (7) | The Forum; 14,979 | 23–10 |
| 34 | January 6; 7:30 p.m. PST | San Antonio | W 99–98 | Kareem Abdul-Jabbar (28) | Kareem Abdul-Jabbar (11) | Michael Cooper (14) | The Forum; 13,513 | 24–10 |
| 35 | January 8; 7:30 p.m. PST | Denver | L 124–126 | Kareem Abdul-Jabbar (35) | Kareem Abdul-Jabbar (12) | Michael Cooper (16) | The Forum; 13,024 | 24–11 |
| 36 | January 10; 7:30 p.m. PST | Utah | W 120–112 | Magic Johnson (20) | Kurt Rambis (11) | Magic Johnson (10) | The Forum; 14,547 | 25–11 |
| 37 | January 11; 5:30 p.m. PST | @ Dallas | W 121–102 | Kareem Abdul-Jabbar (30) | Kareem Abdul-Jabbar (11) | Byron Scott (6) | Reunion Arena; 17,007 | 26–11 |
| 38 | January 13; 9:00 a.m. PST | @ Detroit | L 98–121 | Johnson & McGee (22) | Kareem Abdul-Jabbar (13) | Magic Johnson (10) | Pontiac Silverdome; 23,475 | 26–12 |
| 39 | January 15; 5:30 p.m. PST | @ Milwaukee | L 105–115 | Magic Johnson (32) | James Worthy (11) | Magic Johnson (9) | MECCA Arena; 11,052 | 26–13 |
| 40 | January 16; 5:00 p.m. PST | @ Boston | L 102–104 | Kareem Abdul-Jabbar (33) | 3 players tied (7) | Magic Johnson (13) | Boston Garden; 14,890 | 26–14 |
| 41 | January 18; 7:30 p.m. PST | Dallas | W 110–92 | James Worthy (19) | Kurt Rambis (7) | Magic Johnson (18) | The Forum; 17,505 | 27–14 |
| 42 | January 19; 8:00 p.m. PST | @ Golden State | W 139-109 | Kareem Abdul-Jabbar (22) | James Worthy (7) | Magic Johnson (13) | Oakland-Alameda County Coliseum; 13,295 | 28–14 |
| 43 | January 22 | L.A. Clippers | W 123-114 | Kareem Abdul-Jabbar (23) | Kurt Rambis (12) | Magic Johnson (13) | The Forum; 15,274 | 29–14 |
| 44 | January 25; 8:30 p.m. PST | Philadelphia | W 109–104 | Kareem Abdul-Jabbar (23) | Kareem Abdul-Jabbar (9) | Magic Johnson (15) | The Forum; 17,505 | 30–14 |
| 45 | January 26; 6:30 p.m. PST | @ Utah | L 83–96 | Abdul-Jabbar & Johnson (19) | Magic Johnson (8) | Magic Johnson (6) | Salt Palace; 12,675 | 30–15 |
| 46 | January 29; 7:30 p.m. PST | @ Portland | W 122–106 | Kareem Abdul-Jabbar (29) | Kareem Abdul-Jabbar (13) | Magic Johnson (13) | Memorial Coliseum; 12,666 | 31–15 |
| 47 | January 30; 7:30 p.m. PST | Houston | L 113–116 | Kareem Abdul-Jabbar (34) | Kareem Abdul-Jabbar (9) | Magic Johnson (10) | The Forum; 17,505 | 31–16 |

February: 11–2 (home: 6–0; road: 5–2)

| Game | Date | Team | Score | High points | High rebounds | High assists | Location Attendance | Record |
|---|---|---|---|---|---|---|---|---|
| 48 | February 1 | New York | W 105-104 | Kareem Abdul-Jabbar (26) | Kareem Abdul-Jabbar (13) | Magic Johnson (12) | The Forum; 14,064 | 32–16 |
| 49 | February 2 | @ L.A. Clippers | W 105-96 | James Worthy (21) | Kareem Abdul-Jabbar (14) | Magic Johnson (17) | Los Angeles Memorial Sports Arena; 15,371 | 33–16 |
| 50 | February 3 | Indiana | W 122-100 | James Worthy (18) | Kurt Rambis (15) | Magic Johnson (12) | The Forum; 13,320 | 34–16 |
| 51 | February 5; 5:00 p.m. CST | @ Houston | W 113–104 | Kareem Abdul-Jabbar (40) | James Worthy (10) | Magic Johnson (19) | The Summit; 16,016 | 35–16 |
All-Star Break
| 52 | February 12 | L.A. Clippers | 121-110 | Byron Scott (25) | Bob McAdoo (8) | Magic Johnson (12) | The Forum; 16,125 | 36–16 |
| 53 | February 15; 7:30 p.m. PST | Atlanta | W 120–111 | Magic Johnson (23) | Kurt Rambis (10) | Magic Johnson (16) | The Forum; 13,852 | 37–16 |
| 54 | February 17; 12:30 p.m. PST | Boston | W 117–111 | Magic Johnson (37) | Kurt Rambis (12) | Magic Johnson (13) | The Forum; 17,505 | 38–16 |
| 55 | February 19; 5:30 p.m. PST | @ Chicago | W 127–117 | Kareem Abdul-Jabbar (27) | Kareem Abdul-Jabbar (9) | Magic Johnson (12) | Chicago Stadium; 19,052 | 39–16 |
| 56 | February 21 | @ Kansas City | W 123-117 | James Worthy (26) | Magic Johnson (10) | Magic Johnson (17) | Kemper Arena; 9,606 | 40–16 |
| 57 | February 22 | @ Indiana | L 113-122 | Kareem Abdul-Jabbar (28) | Abdul-Jabbar & Rambis (7) | Magic Johnson (11) | Market Square Arena; 16,511 | 40–17 |
| 58 | February 24 | @ New York | W 119-114 | Kareem Abdul-Jabbar (39) | Rambis & Worthy (11) | Magic Johnson (15) | Madison Square Garden; 16,287 | 41–17 |
| 59 | February 26; 7:30 p.m. PST | Houston | W 100–94 | Abdul-Jabbar & Worthy (19) | Magic Johnson (11) | Magic Johnson (18) | The Forum; 17,505 | 42–17 |
| 60 | February 28; 6:30 p.m. PST | @ Phoenix | L 105–117 | James Worthy (22) | James Worthy (8) | Michael Cooper (9) | Arizona Veterans Memorial Coliseum; 14,660 | 42–18 |

March: 13–1 (home: 7–0; road: 6–1)

| Game | Date | Team | Score | High points | High rebounds | High assists | Location Attendance | Record |
|---|---|---|---|---|---|---|---|---|
| 61 | March 2; 5:30 p.m. PST | @ Dallas | W 125–106 | Kareem Abdul-Jabbar (25) | Kareem Abdul-Jabbar (12) | Magic Johnson (16) | Reunion Arena; 17,007 | 43–18 |
| 62 | March 6; 7:30 p.m. PST | Golden State | W 145-119 | Mike McGee (29) | Kupchak & McGee (7) | Ronnie Lester (10) | The Forum; 15,371 | 44–18 |
| 63 | March 9; 8:00 p.m. PST | Cleveland | W 133–106 | Byron Scott (26) | Kurt Rambis (10) | Magic Johnson (13) | The Forum; 17,505 | 45–18 |
| 64 | March 12; 7:30 p.m. PST | Utah | W 123–108 | 3 players tied (18) | Kurt Rambis (13) | Magic Johnson (13) | The Forum; 17,505 | 46–18 |
| 65 | March 13; 6:30 p.m. PST | @ Utah | W 120–105 | Kareem Abdul-Jabbar (27) | Kareem Abdul-Jabbar (10) | Magic Johnson (11) | Salt Palace; 10,158 | 47–18 |
| 66 | March 15; 7:30 p.m. PST | San Antonio | W 115–114 | James Worthy (25) | McAdoo & Worthy (7) | Magic Johnson (18) | The Forum; 16,130 | 48–18 |
| 67 | March 16 | @ L.A. Clippers | W 123-112 | Magic Johnson (25) | Abdul-Jabbar & Johnson (9) | Magic Johnson (15) | Los Angeles Memorial Sports Arena; 15,371 | 49–18 |
| 68 | March 19; 6:30 p.m. PST | @ Phoenix | W 130–112 | Kareem Abdul-Jabbar (26) | Kareem Abdul-Jabbar (8) | Magic Johnson (10) | Arizona Veterans Memorial Coliseum; 13,473 | 50–18 |
| 69 | March 22; 5:30 p.m. PST | @ Houston | W 130–107 | Kareem Abdul-Jabbar (30) | Abdul-Jabbar & Johnson (8) | Magic Johnson (16) | The Summit; 16,018 | 51–18 |
| 70 | March 24; 7:30 p.m. PST | Detroit | W 148–130 | Kareem Abdul-Jabbar (30) | Kurt Rambis (11) | Magic Johnson (19) | The Forum; 17,505 | 52–18 |
| 71 | March 26; 7:30 p.m. PST | @ Portland | L 113–116 (OT) | Byron Scott (28) | Kurt Rambis (13) | Magic Johnson (14) | Memorial Coliseum; 12,666 | 52–19 |
| 72 | March 27; 7:30 p.m. PST | @ Seattle | W 122-97 | Abdul-Jabbar & Scott (21) | Mitch Kupchak (13) | Magic Johnson (10) | Kingdome; 10,542 | 53–19 |
| 73 | March 29; 7:30 p.m. PST | Dallas | W 120–115 | Magic Johnson (23) | Kareem Abdul-Jabbar (8) | Magic Johnson (13) | The Forum; 17,505 | 54–19 |
| 74 | March 31; 7:00 p.m. PST | Phoenix | W 123–98 | Abdul-Jabbar & Scott (20) | Larry Spriggs (9) | Magic Johnson (14) | The Forum; 15,922 | 55–19 |

April: 7–1 (home: 4–0; road: 3–1)

| Game | Date | Team | Score | High points | High rebounds | High assists | Location Attendance | Record |
|---|---|---|---|---|---|---|---|---|
| 75 | April 2; 6:30 p.m. PST | @ Denver | W 118–104 | Abdul-Jabbar & McAdoo (20) | Kareem Abdul-Jabbar (13) | Magic Johnson (13) | McNichols Sports Arena; 17,022 | 56–19 |
| 76 | April 3; 5:30 p.m. PST | @ San Antonio | L 108–122 | James Worthy (32) | Kurt Rambis (16) | Magic Johnson (13) | HemisFair Arena; 11,627 | 56–20 |
| 77 | April 5 | Kansas City | W 132-125 | Byron Scott (30) | Kurt Rambis (9) | James Worthy (8) | The Forum; 14,625 | 57–20 |
| 78 | April 7; 12:30 p.m. PST | Portland | W 135–133 (OT) | Magic Johnson (39) | Kurt Rambis (15) | Magic Johnson (11) | The Forum; 13,186 | 58–20 |
| 79 | April 9; 7:30 p.m. PST | Denver | W 148–119 | Mike McGee (26) | Magic Johnson (8) | Magic Johnson (11) | The Forum; 17,505 | 59–20 |
| 80 | April 11; 7:30 p.m. PST | @ Golden State | W 137-130 | Magic Johnson (28) | Kurt Rambis (15) | Magic Johnson (17) | Oakland-Alameda County Coliseum; 10,400 | 60–20 |
| 81 | April 12; 7:30 p.m. PST | Seattle | W 145-131 | Mike McGee (41) | Mitch Kupchak (13) | Ronnie Lester (12) | The Forum; 15,434 | 61–20 |
| 82 | April 14 | @ Kansas City | W 122-116 | Byron Scott (25) | Kurt Rambis (12) | Michael Cooper (13) | Kemper Arena; 11,371 | 62–20 |

1984–85 schedule

=== Playoffs ===
1985 playoff game log
Total: 15–4 (Home: 9–2; Road: 6–2)
Western Conference First Round: 3–0 (home: 2–0; road: 1–0)

| Game | Date | Team | Score | High points | High rebounds | High assists | Location Attendance | Series |
|---|---|---|---|---|---|---|---|---|
| 1 | April 18; 7:30 p.m. PST | Phoenix | W 142–114 | Mike McGee (22) | Cooper & McAdoo (6) | Magic Johnson (19) | The Forum; 15,547 | 1–0 |
| 2 | April 20; 12:30 p.m. PST | Phoenix | W 147–130 | Kareem Abdul-Jabbar (24) | Kurt Rambis (7) | Cooper & Johnson (12) | The Forum; 15,261 | 2–0 |
| 3 | April 23; 7:30 p.m. PST | @ Phoenix | W 119–103 | James Worthy (23) | Kurt Rambis (9) | Magic Johnson (11) | Arizona Veterans Memorial Coliseum; 8,741 | 3–0 |

Western Conference Semifinals: 4–1 (home: 3–0; road: 1–1)

| Game | Date | Team | Score | High points | High rebounds | High assists | Location Attendance | Series |
|---|---|---|---|---|---|---|---|---|
| 1 | April 27; 12:30 p.m. PST | Portland | W 125–101 | Byron Scott (20) | Kurt Rambis (14) | Magic Johnson (12) | The Forum; 17,505 | 1–0 |
| 2 | April 30; 7:30 p.m. PDT | Portland | W 134–118 | Byron Scott (31) | Magic Johnson (9) | Magic Johnson (18) | The Forum; 17,505 | 2–0 |
| 3 | May 3; 7:30 p.m. PDT | @ Portland | W 130–126 | James Worthy (28) | Abdul-Jabbar & McAdoo (9) | Magic Johnson (23) | Memorial Coliseum; 12,666 | 3–0 |
| 4 | May 5; 12:30 p.m. PDT | @ Portland | L 107–115 | Magic Johnson (31) | Kareem Abdul-Jabbar (17) | Magic Johnson (13) | Memorial Coliseum; 12,666 | 3–1 |
| 5 | May 7; 7:30 p.m. PDT | Portland | W 139–120 | Magic Johnson (34) | Magic Johnson (9) | Magic Johnson (19) | The Forum; 17,505 | 4–1 |

Western Conference Finals: 4–1 (home: 2–1; road: 2–0)

| Game | Date | Team | Score | High points | High rebounds | High assists | Location Attendance | Series |
|---|---|---|---|---|---|---|---|---|
| 1 | May 11; 12:30 p.m. PDT | Denver | W 139–122 | Byron Scott (27) | 3 players tied (7) | Magic Johnson (16) | The Forum; 16,109 | 1–0 |
| 2 | May 14; 8:00 p.m. PDT | Denver | L 114–136 | Byron Scott (22) | Magic Johnson (9) | Magic Johnson (15) | The Forum; 17,505 | 1–1 |
| 3 | May 17; 7:00 p.m. PDT | @ Denver | W 136–118 | James Worthy (28) | Magic Johnson (14) | Magic Johnson (15) | McNichols Sports Arena; 17,022 | 2–1 |
| 4 | May 19; 3:00 p.m. PDT | @ Denver | W 120–116 | Kareem Abdul-Jabbar (29) | James Worthy (13) | Magic Johnson (13) | McNichols Sports Arena; 17,022 | 3–1 |
| 5 | May 22; 8:30 p.m. PDT | Denver | W 153–109 | James Worthy (25) | Mitch Kupchak (10) | Magic Johnson (19) | The Forum; 17,505 | 4–1 |

NBA Finals: 4–2 (home: 2–1; road: 2–1)

| Game | Date | Team | Score | High points | High rebounds | High assists | Location Attendance | Series |
|---|---|---|---|---|---|---|---|---|
| 1 | May 27; 12 Noon PDT | @ Boston | L 114–148 | James Worthy (20) | Kurt Rambis (9) | Magic Johnson (12) | Boston Garden; 14,890 | 0–1 |
| 2 | May 30; 6:00 p.m. PDT | @ Boston | W 109–102 | Kareem Abdul-Jabbar (30) | Kareem Abdul-Jabbar (17) | Magic Johnson (13) | Boston Garden; 14,890 | 1–1 |
| 3 | June 2; 12:30 p.m. PDT | Boston | W 136–111 | James Worthy (29) | Kareem Abdul-Jabbar (14) | Magic Johnson (16) | The Forum; 17,505 | 2–1 |
| 4 | June 5; 6:00 p.m. PDT | Boston | L 105–107 | Kareem Abdul-Jabbar (21) | Magic Johnson (11) | Magic Johnson (12) | The Forum; 17,505 | 2–2 |
| 5 | June 7; 6:00 p.m. PDT | Boston | W 120–111 | Kareem Abdul-Jabbar (36) | Kurt Rambis (9) | Magic Johnson (17) | The Forum; 17,505 | 3–2 |
| 6 | June 9; 10:00 a.m. PDT | @ Boston | W 111–100 | Kareem Abdul-Jabbar (29) | Johnson & Rambis (10) | Magic Johnson (14) | Boston Garden; 14,890 | 4–2 |

1985 schedule

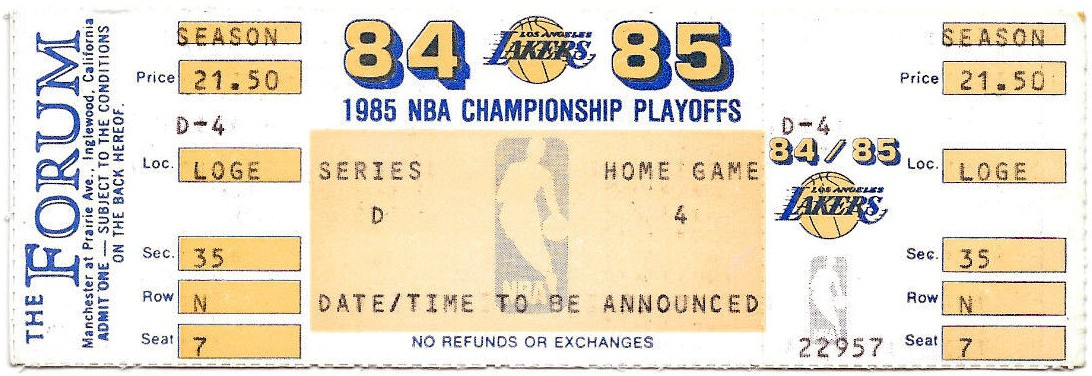
A ticket for Game 2 of the Western Conference Semifinals between the Lakers and the Trail Blazers.

== Player statistics ==
Legend
| GP | Games played | GS | Games started | MPG | Minutes per game |
| FG% | Field-goal percentage | 3P% | 3-point field-goal percentage | FT% | Free-throw percentage |
| RPG | Rebounds per game | APG | Assists per game | SPG | Steals per game |
| BPG | Blocks per game | PPG | Points per game |

=== Regular season ===
Los Angeles Lakers statistics
| Player | GP | GS | MPG | FG% | 3P% | FT% | RPG | APG | SPG | BPG | PPG |
|---|---|---|---|---|---|---|---|---|---|---|---|
| Kareem Abdul-Jabbar | 79 | 79 | 33.3 | .599 | .000 | .732 | 7.9 | 3.2 | 0.8 | 2.1 | 22.0 |
| Magic Johnson | 77 | 77 | 36.1 | .561 | .189 | .843 | 6.2 | 12.6 | 1.5 | 0.3 | 18.3 |
| James Worthy | 80 | 76 | 33.7 | .572 | .000 | .776 | 6.4 | 2.5 | 1.1 | 0.8 | 17.6 |
| Byron Scott | 81 | 65 | 28.5 | .539 | .433 | .820 | 2.6 | 3.0 | 1.2 | 0.2 | 16.0 |
| Bob McAdoo | 66 | 0 | 19.0 | .520 | .000 | .753 | 4.5 | 1.0 | 0.3 | 0.8 | 10.5 |
| Mike McGee | 76 | 3 | 15.4 | .538 | .361 | .588 | 2.2 | 0.9 | 0.5 | 0.1 | 10.2 |
| Michael Cooper | 82 | 20 | 26.7 | .465 | .285 | .865 | 3.1 | 5.2 | 1.1 | 0.6 | 8.6 |
| Jamaal Wilkes | 42 | 8 | 18.1 | .488 | .000 | .773 | 2.2 | 1.0 | 0.5 | 0.1 | 8.3 |
| Larry Spriggs | 75 | 32 | 17.2 | .548 | .000 | .767 | 3.0 | 1.8 | 0.6 | 0.2 | 6.7 |
| Mitch Kupchak | 58 | 3 | 12.3 | .504 | | .659 | 3.2 | 0.4 | 0.3 | 0.3 | 5.3 |
| Kurt Rambis | 82 | 46 | 19.7 | .554 | | .660 | 6.4 | 0.8 | 1.0 | 0.6 | 5.2 |
| Ronnie Lester | 32 | 1 | 8.7 | .415 | .000 | .677 | 0.8 | 2.5 | 0.5 | 0.1 | 2.8 |
| Chuck Nevitt | 11 | 0 | 5.4 | .294 | | .250 | 1.8 | 0.3 | 0.0 | 1.4 | 1.1 |
| Earl Jones | 2 | 0 | 3.5 | .000 | | | 0.0 | 0.0 | 0.0 | 0.0 | 0.0 |

== Awards and records ==
- Kareem Abdul-Jabbar, NBA Finals Most Valuable Player Award
- Magic Johnson, All-NBA First Team
- Kareem Abdul-Jabbar, All-NBA Second Team
- Michael Cooper, NBA All-Defensive First Team
