= Chuck Nevitt =

American basketball player (born 1959)

Personal information
- Born: June 13, 1959 (age 67) Cortez, Colorado, U.S.
- Listed height: 7 ft 5 in (2.26 m)
- Listed weight: 217 lb (98 kg)

Career information
- High school: Sprayberry (Marietta, Georgia)
- College: NC State (1978–1982)
- NBA draft: 1982: 3rd round, 63rd overall pick
- Drafted by: Houston Rockets
- Playing career: 1983–1994
- Position: Center
- Number: 52, 43, 42, 25

Career history
- 1983: Houston Rockets
- 1983–1984: Houston Flyers
- 1984–1985: Los Angeles Lakers
- 1985–1988: Detroit Pistons
- 1988–1989: Houston Rockets
- 1989–1990: Rapid City Thrillers
- 1991: Miami Tropics
- 1991: Chicago Bulls
- 1992–1993: Capital Region Pontiacs
- 1993: San Antonio Spurs
- 1993–1994: Hartford Hellcats

Career highlights
- NBA champion (1985)

Career NBA statistics
- Points: 251 (1.6 ppg)
- Rebounds: 239 (1.5 rpg)
- Blocks: 111 (.7 bpg)
- Stats at NBA.com
- Stats at Basketball Reference

Charles Goodrich Nevitt (born June 13, 1959) is an American former professional basketball player, known primarily for his great height. At 7 ft 5 in (2.26 m), he played the center position throughout his nine-year career (1983, 1985–1990, 1992, 1993) in the National Basketball Association (NBA), and remains one of the tallest players ever in NBA history. During his career, Nevitt played with the Houston Rockets, Los Angeles Lakers, Detroit Pistons, Chicago Bulls and San Antonio Spurs.

== Early life ==
Nevitt attended Sprayberry High School in Marietta, Georgia, and played college basketball at North Carolina State University. In college, he played 90 games over four seasons, averaging 3.0 points and 2.4 rebounds per game.

== NBA career ==
He was selected in the third round of the 1982 NBA draft by the Houston Rockets, subsequently playing 15 games with the Los Angeles Lakers over two seasons.

After leaving the Lakers for the Pistons, Nevitt was on the roster of the Chuck Daly-coached team that lost to the Lakers in seven games in the 1988 NBA Finals.

After a return to the Rockets, he also signed a 10-day contract with the Michael Jordan-led Bulls in the 1991–92 season, and played one game with the Spurs – the 1993–94 season opener – on November 5, in which he made 3-of-6 free throws in less than a minute against the Golden State Warriors. He was released shortly thereafter, never to reappear in an NBA game.

Nevitt played in the NBA for nine seasons, appearing in 155 games. He played a total of 826 minutes (5.3 minutes per game). He played in 16 playoff games across five postseasons: seven each with the Lakers and Pistons, and two with the Rockets. Nevitt was a member of the 1985 Lakers' championship team.

Nevitt was the tallest NBA player to ever win an NBA championship, and as of 2025 was the tallest American-born player in NBA history. (Note: Nevitt is tied with three other players as the sixth-tallest player in NBA history. Shawn Bradley, who is one inch taller than Nevitt, was born in West Germany to American parents. All other NBA players taller than Nevitt were born and raised outside the United States.)

== Post-NBA and personal life ==
Nevitt is married to Sondra Childers and has a sister, Lynne, who is also a basketball player. He worked at NetApp in the research triangle park in NC performing computer networking functions.

Nevitt went by the nicknames Chuck E. Cheese and the Human Victory Cigar.

== Career statistics ==
Legend
GP	Games played	GS	Games started	MPG	Minutes per game
FG%	Field goal percentage	3P%	3-point field goal percentage	FT%	Free throw percentage
RPG	Rebounds per game	APG	Assists per game	SPG	Steals per game
BPG	Blocks per game	PPG	Points per game	**Bold**	Career high
†	Won an NBA championship

=== NBA ===
==== Regular season ====
Year	Team	GP	GS	MPG	FG%	3P%	FT%	RPG	APG	SPG	BPG	PPG
1982–83	Houston	6	0	**10.7**	.733	–	.250	**2.8**	.0	.2	**2.0**	**3.8**
1984–85†	L.A. Lakers	11	0	5.4	.294	–	.250	1.8	.3	.0	1.4	1.1
1985–86	L.A. Lakers	4	0	6.3	.273	–	.667	1.8	**.5**	**.5**	.5	2.5
1985–86	Detroit	25	0	4.0	.375	–	**.750**	1.0	.2	.1	.7	1.6
1986–87	Detroit	41	0	6.5	.492	–	.583	2.0	.1	.2	.7	1.9
1987–88	Detroit	17	0	3.7	.333	–	.500	1.1	.0	.1	.3	1.0
1988–89	Houston	**43**	0	5.3	.435	–	.688	1.5	.1	.1	.7	1.5
1989–90	Houston	3	0	3.0	**1.000**	–	–	1.0	.3	.0	.3	1.3
1991–92	Chicago	4	0	2.3	.333	–	–	.3	.3	.0	.0	.5
1993–94	San Antonio	1	0	1.0	–	–	.500	1.0	.0	.0	.0	3.0
Career		155	0	5.3	.438	–	.589	1.5	.1	.1	.7	1.6

==== Playoffs ====
Year	Team	GP	GS	MPG	FG%	3P%	FT%	RPG	APG	SPG	BPG	PPG
1985†	L.A. Lakers	**7**	0	**5.3**	.333	–	.500	.9	**.1**	**.6**	.9	**1.4**
1986	Detroit	1	0	1.0	–	–	–	.0	.0	.0	.0	.0
1987	Detroit	3	0	3.3	.200	–	**1.000**	**2.0**	.0	.0	**1.0**	1.3
1988	Detroit	3	0	1.3	**.500**	–	–	1.0	.0	.0	.0	.7
1989	Houston	2	0	1.5	–	–	–	.5	.0	.0	.0	.0
Career		16	0	3.4	.313	–	.600	1.0	.1	.3	.6	1.0

=== College ===
Year	Team	GP	FG%	FT%	RPG	APG	SPG	BPG	PPG
1978–79	NC State	19	.500	.267	1.3	.1	.1	.6	1.3
1979–80	NC State	19	**.609**	.200	1.8	.2	.0	.4	1.6
1980–81	NC State	21	.577	.435	1.1	.0	.0	.5	1.9
1981–82	NC State	**31**	.588	**.561**	**4.4**	**.5**	**.3**	**2.0**	**5.5**
Career		90	.580	.457	2.4	.2	.1	1.0	3.0

== See also ==
- List of tallest players in National Basketball Association history
