= Larry Spriggs =

American basketball player

Personal information
- Born: September 8, 1959 (age 67) Cheverly, Maryland, U.S.
- Listed height: 6 ft 7 in (2.01 m)
- Listed weight: 230 lb (104 kg)

Career information
- High school: Northwestern (Hyattsville, Maryland)
- College: San Jacinto (1977–1978); Howard (1978–1981)
- NBA draft: 1981: 4th round, 81st overall pick
- Drafted by: Houston Rockets
- Playing career: 1981–1996
- Position: Small forward
- Number: 35

Career history
- 1981–1982: Rochester Zeniths
- 1982: Houston Rockets
- 1982: Las Vegas Silvers
- 1982–1983: Albany Patroons
- 1983: Chicago Bulls
- 1983–1986: Los Angeles Lakers
- 1986–1987: Real Madrid
- 1987–1988: Çukurova Sanayi
- 1989: Santa Barbara Islanders
- 1989–1990: Tofaş
- 1990–1991: Gravelines
- 1991–1993: Fabriano Basket
- 1993–1994: Montpellier
- 1994: Olimpia de Venado Tuerto
- 1995–1996: Oyak Renault

Career highlights
- NBA champion (1985); CBA All-Star Game MVP (1983); All-CBA First Team (1982); All-CBA Second Team (1983); CBA Rookie of the Year (1982); MEAC Player of the Year (1981)
- Stats at NBA.com
- Stats at Basketball Reference

Lawrence Michael Spriggs (born September 8, 1959) is an American former professional basketball player.

Spriggs was born in Cheverly, Maryland. A 6'7" small forward from Howard University, Spriggs began his professional career in the minor-league Continental Basketball Association (CBA), where he earned 1982 Rookie of the Year Honors with the Rochester Zeniths. Spriggs later played in the National Basketball Association, most notably with the Los Angeles Lakers, with whom he won an NBA Championship in 1985. Then he played with Real Madrid Baloncesto in Spain.

== Career statistics ==
Legend
GP	Games played	GS	Games started	MPG	Minutes per game
FG%	Field goal percentage	3P%	3-point field goal percentage	FT%	Free throw percentage
RPG	Rebounds per game	APG	Assists per game	SPG	Steals per game
BPG	Blocks per game	PPG	Points per game	**Bold**	Career high
†	Won an NBA championship

=== NBA ===
==== Regular season ====
Year	Team	GP	GS	MPG	FG%	3P%	FT%	RPG	APG	SPG	BPG	PPG
1981–82	Houston	4	0	9.3	**.636**	–	.000	1.5	1.0	.5	.0	3.5
1982–83	Chicago	9	0	4.3	.400	–	.714	1.0	.3	.1	**.2**	2.3
1983–84	L.A. Lakers	38	0	9.6	.537	.000	.720	1.6	.8	.3	.1	3.3
1984–85†	L.A. Lakers	**75**	**32**	**17.2**	.548	.000	.767	**3.0**	**1.8**	**.6**	**.2**	**6.7**
1985–86	L.A. Lakers	43	7	11.0	.458	.000	**.776**	1.9	1.1	.4	**.2**	5.0
Career		169	39	13.0	.517	.000	.752	2.3	1.3	.5	.2	5.2

=== Playoffs ===
Year	Team	GP	GS	MPG	FG%	3P%	FT%	RPG	APG	SPG	BPG	PPG
1982	Houston	2		4.5	.750	–	.000	.5	1.0	.0	.0	3.0
1984	L.A. Lakers	9		5.0	.368	–	**1.000**	1.0	.3	.0	.1	2.8
1985†	L.A. Lakers	**16**	0	**14.4**	.519	.000	.621	**3.2**	**2.1**	**.3**	**.3**	6.1
1986	L.A. Lakers	3	0	4.3	**.833**	–	**1.000**	2.3	.7	**.3**	.0	**6.7**
Career		30	0	9.9	.519	.000	.765	2.3	1.3	.2	.2	5.0
