= Mike McGee (basketball) =

American basketball player (born 1959)

Personal information
- Born: July 29, 1959 (age 67) Tyler, Texas, U.S.
- Listed height: 6 ft 5 in (1.96 m)
- Listed weight: 190 lb (86 kg)

Career information
- High school: Omaha North (Omaha, Nebraska)
- College: Michigan (1977–1981)
- NBA draft: 1981: 1st round, 19th overall pick
- Drafted by: Los Angeles Lakers
- Playing career: 1981–1992
- Position: Shooting guard
- Number: 40, 25, 22

Career history
- 1981–1986: Los Angeles Lakers
- 1986–1987: Atlanta Hawks
- 1987–1988: Sacramento Kings
- 1988–1989: New Jersey Nets
- 1989–1990: Aurora Desio
- 1990: Phoenix Suns
- 1991: Rapid City Thrillers
- 1991–1992: Gaiteros del Zulia

Career highlights
- 2× NBA champion (1982, 1985); Honorable mention All-American - AP (1981); 2× All-Big Ten (1980, 1981)

Career NBA statistics
- Points: 4,968 (9.6 ppg)
- Rebounds: 1,112 (2.1 rpg)
- Assists: 629 (1.2 apg)
- Stats at NBA.com
- Stats at Basketball Reference

Michael Ray McGee (born July 29, 1959) is an American professional basketball coach and former player in the National Basketball Association (NBA). He won two NBA championships as a player with the Los Angeles Lakers.

== Early years ==
McGee was born in Tyler, Texas. He then moved to Omaha, Nebraska, where he played high school basketball at Omaha North High School. He averaged 38 points per game and scored 916 total points as a senior in the 1976–77 season.

He earned 10 Metro Conference scoring records and had an average of 38.1 points per game. He was named to the Nebraska All-Star State Team at least twice in the 1970s and was also The World-Herald athlete of the year in 1977.

== College career ==
McGee accepted a basketball scholarship from the University of Michigan. He became the first player in Michigan Wolverines men's basketball history to lead the team in scoring four consecutive years. He did so with 531 points (19.7 points per game) in the 1977–78 season, 511 points (18.9 points per game) in the 1978–79 season, 665 points (22.2 points per game) in the 1979–80 season, and 732 points (24.4 points per game) in the 1980–81 season.

He was a four-year starter, graduated as the school's all-time leading scorer and had a career average of 21.4 points per game, while ranking among Michigan's career leaders in several statistical categories.

=== Awards and accomplishments ===
- 1st in career field goals made (1,010)
- 1st in career field goal attempts (2,078)
- 2nd in career points (2,439)
- 2nd in single season field goals made (309 in 1980–81 season)
- 3rd in single season points (732 in 1980–81 season)
- 3rd in single season field goal attempts (600 in 1980–81 season)
- 5th in career points per game (21.4 points per game)
- 5th in free throws made (406)

== Professional career ==
McGee was selected by the Los Angeles Lakers, in the first round (18th overall) of the 1981 NBA draft. He won two NBA championships with the Lakers in 1982 and 1985.

On June 16, 1986, he was traded along with the rights to power forward Ken Barlow to the Atlanta Hawks, in exchange for the rights to small forward Billy Thompson and shooting guard Ron Kellogg. He was a reserve player with the Hawks.

On December 14, 1987, he was traded to the Sacramento Kings, in exchange for a 1991 second round draft choice (#30-Rodney Monroe) and a 1995 second round pick (#42-Donnie Boyce).

On October 31, 1988, he was traded to the New York Nets, in exchange for a 1991 second round draft choice (#31-Randy Brown) and a 1996 second round pick (#37-Jeff McInnis).

On March 25, 1990, he signed as an unrestricted free agent with the Phoenix Suns. He wasn't re-signed after the season.

He played basketball for the Limoges CSP in France, Desio in Italy and Beijing Lions in China. He coached basketball for the Beijing Aoshen and the Shanxi Zhongyu Brave Dragons in the Chinese Basketball Association. He also coached professional basketball teams in Korea.

== Career playing statistics ==
Legend
GP	Games played	GS	Games started	MPG	Minutes per game
FG%	Field goal percentage	3P%	3-point field goal percentage	FT%	Free throw percentage
RPG	Rebounds per game	APG	Assists per game	SPG	Steals per game
BPG	Blocks per game	PPG	Points per game	**Bold**	Career high
†	Won an NBA championship

=== NBA ===
==== Regular season ====
Year	Team	GP	GS	MPG	FG%	3P%	FT%	RPG	APG	SPG	BPG	PPG
1981–82†	L.A. Lakers	39	0	9.0	.465	.000	.585	1.3	.4	.5	.1	4.9
1982–83	L.A. Lakers	39	7	9.8	.423	.143	.739	1.4	.7	.3	.1	4.0
1983–84	L.A. Lakers	77	45	18.5	**.594**	.167	.540	2.5	1.1	.6	.1	9.8
1984–85†	L.A. Lakers	76	3	15.4	.538	.361	.588	2.2	.9	.5	.1	10.2
1985–86	L.A. Lakers	71	19	17.1	.463	.360	.656	2.0	1.2	.7	.1	8.3
1986–87	Atlanta	76	6	18.7	.459	**.376**	.584	2.1	**2.0**	.8	.0	10.4
1987–88	Atlanta	11	0	10.6	.423	.263	.333	1.5	1.2	.5	.0	4.6
1987–88	Sacramento	37	0	23.9	.421	.340	**.771**	**3.0**	1.6	**1.3**	**.2**	**14.2**
1988–89	New Jersey	**80**	**49**	**25.3**	.473	.365	.535	2.4	1.5	1.0	**.2**	13.0
1989–90	Phoenix	14	7	20.0	.483	.348	.476	2.6	1.1	.6	.1	7.3
Career		520	136	17.8	.487	.354	.597	2.1	1.2	.7	.1	9.6

==== Playoffs ====
Year	Team	GP	GS	MPG	FG%	3P%	FT%	RPG	APG	SPG	BPG	PPG
1982†	L.A. Lakers	4		2.5	.462	.000	–	.8	.0	.0	.0	3.0
1983	L.A. Lakers	6		4.2	.364	**1.000**	**.750**	1.2	.2	.0	.0	2.0
1984	L.A. Lakers	**17**	0	**21.8**	**.573**	.353	.641	2.0	1.4	**.6**	**.1**	**12.4**
1985†	L.A. Lakers	**17**	0	15.3	.535	.500	.690	2.1	.7	.4	.0	11.2
1986	L.A. Lakers	6	0	4.7	.444	.000	.000	.8	.3	.0	.0	2.7
1987	Atlanta	8	0	12.6	.256	.143	.500	**2.5**	**1.9**	.5	.0	3.4
1990	Phoenix	10	0	4.4	.350	.429	.250	.4	.2	.1	.1	1.8
Career		68	0	12.3	.503	.344	.612	1.6	.8	.3	.0	7.1
