= Kurt Rambis =

American basketball player and coach (born 1958)

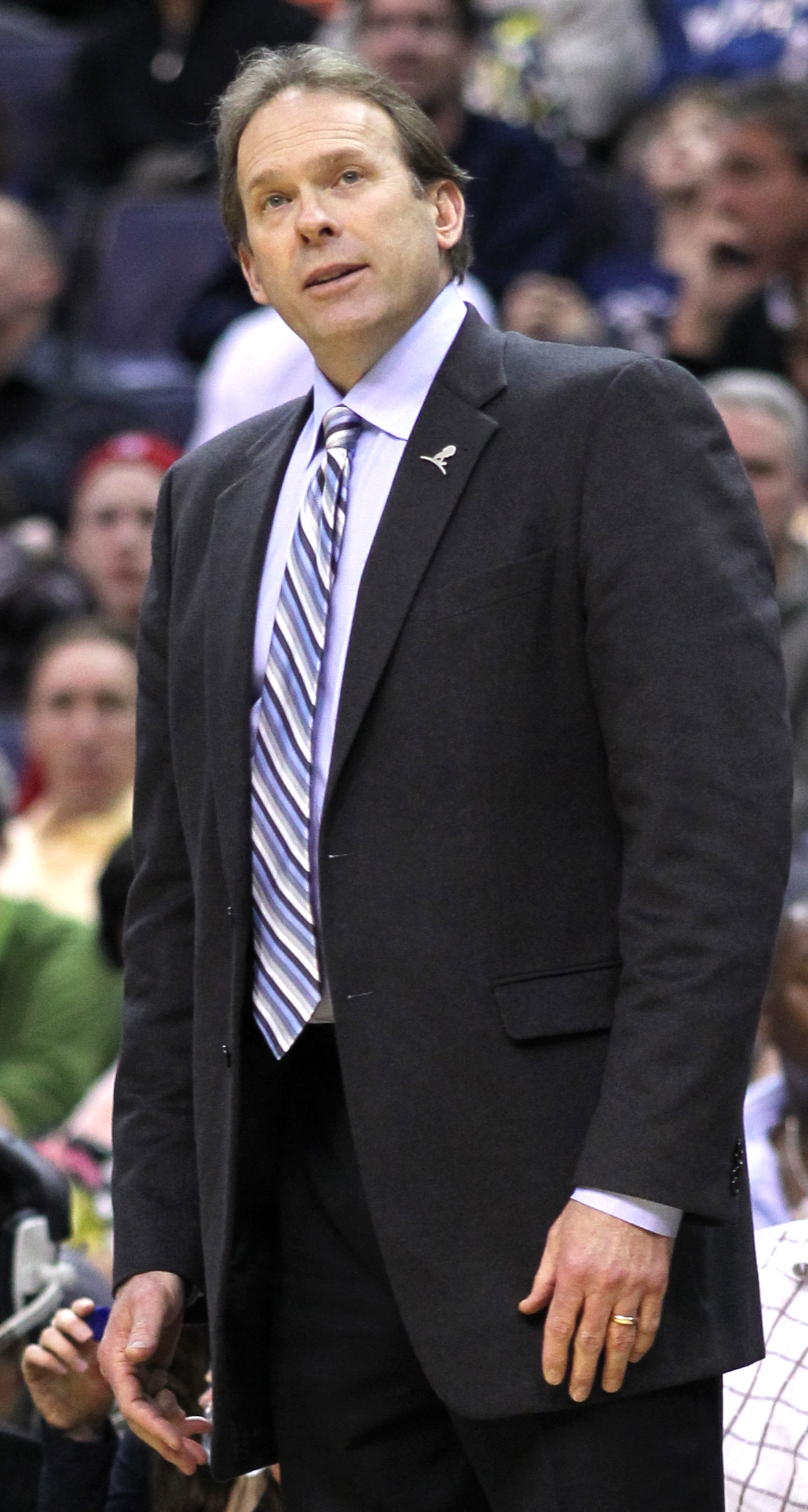
- Rambis as head coach of the Timberwolves in 2011

Los Angeles Lakers
- Title: Senior basketball advisor
- League: NBA

Personal information
- Born: February 25, 1958 (age 68) Terre Haute, Indiana, U.S.
- Listed height: 6 ft 8 in (2.03 m)
- Listed weight: 213 lb (97 kg)

Career information
- High school: Cupertino (Cupertino, California)
- College: Santa Clara (1976–1980)
- NBA draft: 1980: 3rd round, 58th overall pick
- Drafted by: New York Knicks
- Playing career: 1980–1995
- Position: Power forward
- Number: 31, 30, 18
- Coaching career: 1994–present

Career history

Playing
- 1980–1981: AEK Athens
- 1981–1988: Los Angeles Lakers
- 1988–1989: Charlotte Hornets
- 1989–1992: Phoenix Suns
- 1992–1993: Sacramento Kings
- 1993–1995: Los Angeles Lakers

Career highlights
- As player: 4× NBA champion (1982, 1985, 1987, 1988); Greek Cup winner (1981); WCAC Player of the Year (1980); First-team All-WCAC (1980); No. 34 retired by Santa Clara Broncos; As assistant coach: 2× NBA champion (2002, 2009); As executive: 3× NBA champion (2000, 2001, 2020)

Career NBA statistics
- Points: 4,603 (5.2 ppg)
- Rebounds: 4,961 (5.6 rpg)
- Assists: 931 (1.1 apg)
- Stats at NBA.com
- Stats at Basketball Reference

Darrell Kurt Rambis (born February 25, 1958) is an American former professional basketball player and coach who is a senior basketball adviser for the Los Angeles Lakers of the National Basketball Association (NBA). As a player, he won four NBA championships while playing power forward for the Lakers. Rambis was a key member of the Showtime era Lakers and was extremely popular for his hard-nosed blue collar play. With his trademark black horn-rimmed glasses, Rambis complemented the flashy Hollywood style of the Showtime era Lakers.

Rambis played college basketball for the Santa Clara Broncos. As a senior in 1980, he was named the player of the year in the West Coast Conference (WCC). Rambis was selected by the New York Knicks in the third round of the 1980 NBA draft, but began his career in Greece with AEK Athens before joining the Lakers. He also played for the Charlotte Hornets, Phoenix Suns, and Sacramento Kings. Rambis became a coach and has served as head coach for the Lakers, Minnesota Timberwolves, and the Knicks. He also won two league championships as an assistant coach with the Lakers.

== Early life ==
Rambis was born in Terre Haute, Indiana, into a family of Greek extraction. His family moved to Cupertino, California in his preschool years; his number is retired at Cupertino High School.

== College career ==
He graduated from Santa Clara University, where he played from 1976 to 1980, becoming its second-leading rebounder and all-time leading scorer with 1,736 points. During his Santa Clara years, he was awarded the WCC Freshman of the Year and Conference Player of the Year as a senior. His No. 34 was retired on December 29, 2008.

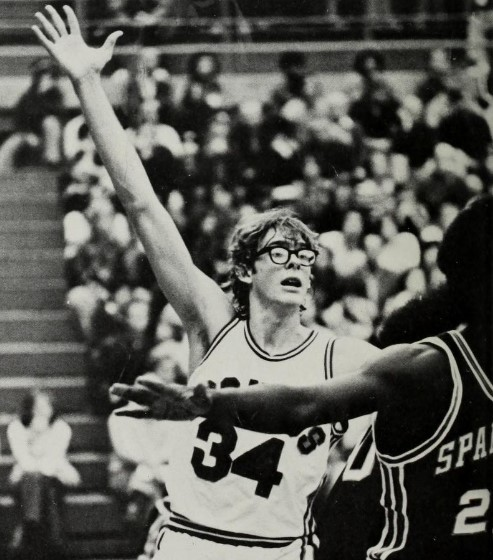
Rambis as a freshman at Santa Clara, 1977

== Professional career ==
Rambis was drafted by the New York Knicks as the 58th pick in the 1980 NBA draft, but he was subsequently waived by the Knicks. He played in Greece in the Greek League for the club AEK Athens, under the name Kyriakos Rambidis. Being of Greek descent, he also acquired Greek citizenship. AEK won the Greek Cup in 1981. He was re-signed by the Knicks in 1981 but never played a game for them.

Rambis was signed as a free agent by the Los Angeles Lakers in 1981, which started his success as an NBA player. Rambis spent most of his 14 seasons in the NBA with the Lakers, winning championships in 1982, 1985, 1987, and 1988 as part of their Showtime teams. During his playing days, Rambis was a favorite among the Lakers fans because of his status as an overachieving underdog and ultimate team player.

Known for his defensive and rebounding skills, he was remembered in Los Angeles for his all-out effort and willingness to do the "dirty work". Rambis usually wore a thick moustache and thick-rimmed black glasses, prompting Lakers announcer Chick Hearn to nickname him "Superman" (in reference to the character's alter ego, Clark Kent). At the Lakers home arena a "Superman" fan club (also known as Rambis youth) was formed where the courtside spectators wore glasses styled similar to the ones used by Rambis. Lakers head coach Pat Riley once complained to a reporter "Other guys have sharp Adidas bags. [Rambis]'s got this black satchel, like the kind you would have a bowling ball in. And it's, like, vinyl. He doesn't ever bring a garment bag or a suitcase. That's all he ever brings, could be a week."

Rambis also played for the Charlotte Hornets, Phoenix Suns, and Sacramento Kings before returning to the Lakers for the 1993–94 season. He retired as a player with the Lakers in 1995.

== Coaching career ==
=== Los Angeles Lakers (1994–2009) ===
Rambis began working as a special assistant coach for the Lakers in 1994 but eventually returned to the active playing roster in February 1995. He was waived at the beginning of the 1995–96 season and resumed his role as an assistant. He served as head coach of the Lakers during the 1999 "lockout season" after coach Del Harris was fired. He achieved moderate success, registering a 24–13 record in the regular season before being swept by the San Antonio Spurs in the 1999 Western Conference Semifinals. When Phil Jackson was hired as head coach, Rambis served as the Lakers' assistant general manager. He later became an assistant coach under Jackson between 2001 and 2004, helping the Lakers reach the 2002 and the 2004 NBA Finals, with Los Angeles winning a title in the former series. He was hired again as an assistant in 2005, along with former player Brian Shaw, helping the Lakers to another pair of finals in 2008 and 2009. The Lakers won in the latter attempt.

=== Minnesota Timberwolves (2009–2011) ===
In 2007 and 2009, Rambis interviewed for the Sacramento Kings' head coaching job. The Kings offered Rambis the position in 2009, but he turned down the job due to wanting more than a two-year contract and more money than they offered.

On August 8, 2009, Rambis was announced as the new head coach for the Minnesota Timberwolves, agreeing to a contract believed to be for four years and worth $8 million. Rambis' predecessor as the Timberwolves' head coach was Kevin McHale, who had clotheslined Rambis in game 4 of the 1984 NBA Finals. Rambis coached the Timberwolves for two seasons, compiling a 32–132 record in two seasons before being fired on July 12, 2011.

=== Return to the Lakers (2013–2014) ===
On July 29, 2013, the Lakers announced they had re-hired Rambis as an assistant coach.

=== New York Knicks (2014–2018) ===
On July 7, 2014, the Knicks announced they had hired Rambis to be the assistant head coach of the team under head coach Derek Fisher. On February 8, 2016, Rambis was named the interim head coach after Fisher was fired. After going 9-19 under Rambis, and finishing the season 32–50 overall, the Knicks decided to hire Jeff Hornacek as the team's new head coach, while Rambis was retained as associate head coach. On April 12, 2018, Rambis was fired along with Hornacek, who went 60–104 over two seasons with the Knicks.

== Executive career ==
=== Los Angeles Lakers (2018–present) ===
In September 2018, Rambis rejoined the Lakers as a senior basketball adviser. Rambis has become "one of the most influential members of the organization since returning to the franchise in 2017." Kurt Rambis's wife, Linda Rambis, serves as the Lakers Executive Director of Special Projects and is one of Jeanie Buss's longtime friends. Alongside Rob Pelinka, the couple has been described as "a pillar of the club’s four-pronged brain trust alongside [Jeanie] Buss."

== Outside basketball ==
Rambis had a recurring role as Coach Cleary in the family drama 7th Heaven. He also guest-starred in season one of Sweet Valley High in episode 13 "Club X" as a friend of Elizabeth and an episode of The Commish as a basketball player. He appeared in the "Going Places" episode (as himself) of It's Garry Shandling's Show. Rambis also made a cameo appearance in an episode of Malcolm & Eddie.

== Career playing statistics ==
Legend
GP	Games played	GS	Games started	MPG	Minutes per game
FG%	Field goal percentage	3P%	3-point field goal percentage	FT%	Free throw percentage
RPG	Rebounds per game	APG	Assists per game	SPG	Steals per game
BPG	Blocks per game	PPG	Points per game	**Bold**	Career high
†	Won an NBA championship	*	Led the league

=== NBA ===
==== Regular season ====
Year	Team	GP	GS	MPG	FG%	3P%	FT%	RPG	APG	SPG	BPG	PPG
1981–82†	L.A. Lakers	64	43	17.7	.518	.000	.504	5.4	.9	.9	**1.2**	4.6
1982–83	L.A. Lakers	78	**77**	23.2	.569	.000	.687	6.8	1.2	1.3	.8	7.5
1983–84	L.A. Lakers	47	31	15.8	.558	–	.636	5.7	.7	.6	.3	3.6
1984–85†	L.A. Lakers	**82***	46	19.7	.554	–	.660	6.4	.8	1.0	.6	5.2
1985–86	L.A. Lakers	74	74	21.3	**.595**	–	.721	7.0	.9	.9	.4	5.5
1986–87†	L.A. Lakers	78	10	19.4	.521	–	.764	5.8	.8	.9	.5	5.7
1987–88†	L.A. Lakers	70	20	12.1	.548	–	**.785**	3.8	.8	.6	.2	4.0
1988–89	Charlotte	75	75	**29.8**	.518	.000	.734	**9.4**	**2.1**	1.3	.8	**11.1**
1989–90	Charlotte	16	16	28.0	.500	.000	.545	7.5	1.8	**2.0**	.6	9.1
1989–90	Phoenix	58	45	25.1	.514	.000	.722	7.0	1.8	1.2	.5	5.4
1990–91	Phoenix	62	17	14.5	.497	.000	.706	4.3	1.0	.4	.2	3.6
1991–92	Phoenix	28	5	13.6	.463	–	.778	3.8	1.3	.4	.5	3.2
1992–93	Phoenix	5	0	8.2	.571	–	.500	1.2	.2	.6	.0	1.8
1992–93	Sacramento	67	1	11.7	.516	.000	.667	3.3	.8	.6	.3	2.5
1993–94	L.A. Lakers	50	1	12.7	.518	.000	.648	3.8	.6	.4	.5	3.3
1994–95	L.A. Lakers	26	1	7.5	.514	–	.667	1.3	.6	.1	.3	1.7
Career		880	462	18.5	.534	.000	.689	5.6	1.1	.9	.5	5.2

==== Playoffs ====
Year	Team	GP	GS	MPG	FG%	3P%	FT%	RPG	APG	SPG	BPG	PPG
1982†	L.A. Lakers	14		19.9	.516	–	.615	6.1	.8	.6	.9	5.9
1983	L.A. Lakers	15		**25.1**	.570	–	.657	6.0	1.1	.9	**1.1**	**7.5**
1984	L.A. Lakers	**21**		20.4	**.652**	–	.636	5.8	.7	.5	.5	6.7
1985†	L.A. Lakers	19	**19**	19.7	.593	–	.679	6.8	.9	.9	.5	6.1
1986	L.A. Lakers	14	14	19.1	.600	–	.722	5.9	1.0	.7	.5	4.8
1987†	L.A. Lakers	17	0	12.6	.585	–	**.912**	3.9	.5	.5	.2	4.6
1988†	L.A. Lakers	19	6	9.8	.618	–	.692	2.7	.5	.3	.1	2.7
1990	Phoenix	16	16	24.1	.444	.000	.679	**7.7**	**1.4**	.5	.5	4.2
1991	Phoenix	4	0	13.3	.400	–	–	3.5	1.0	**1.3**	.3	1.0
Career		139	55	18.5	.574	.000	.702	5.5	.9	.6	.5	5.2

== Head coaching record ==
Legend
Regular season	G	Games coached	W	Games won	L	Games lost	W–L %	Win–loss %
Playoffs	PG	Playoff games	PW	Playoff wins	PL	Playoff losses	PW–L %	Playoff win–loss %

Team	Year	G	W	L	W–L%	Finish	PG	PW	PL	PW–L%	Result
L.A. Lakers	1998–99	37	24	13	.649	2nd in Pacific	8	3	5	.375	Lost in Conf. Semifinals
Minnesota	2009–10	82	15	67	.183	5th in Northwest	—	—	—	—	Missed Playoffs
Minnesota	2010–11	82	17	65	.207	5th in Northwest	—	—	—	—	Missed Playoffs
New York	2015–16	28	9	19	.321	3rd in Atlantic	—	—	—	—	Missed Playoffs
Career		229	65	164	.284		8	3	5	.375	
