= Tom Chambers (basketball) =

American former NBA player (born 1959)

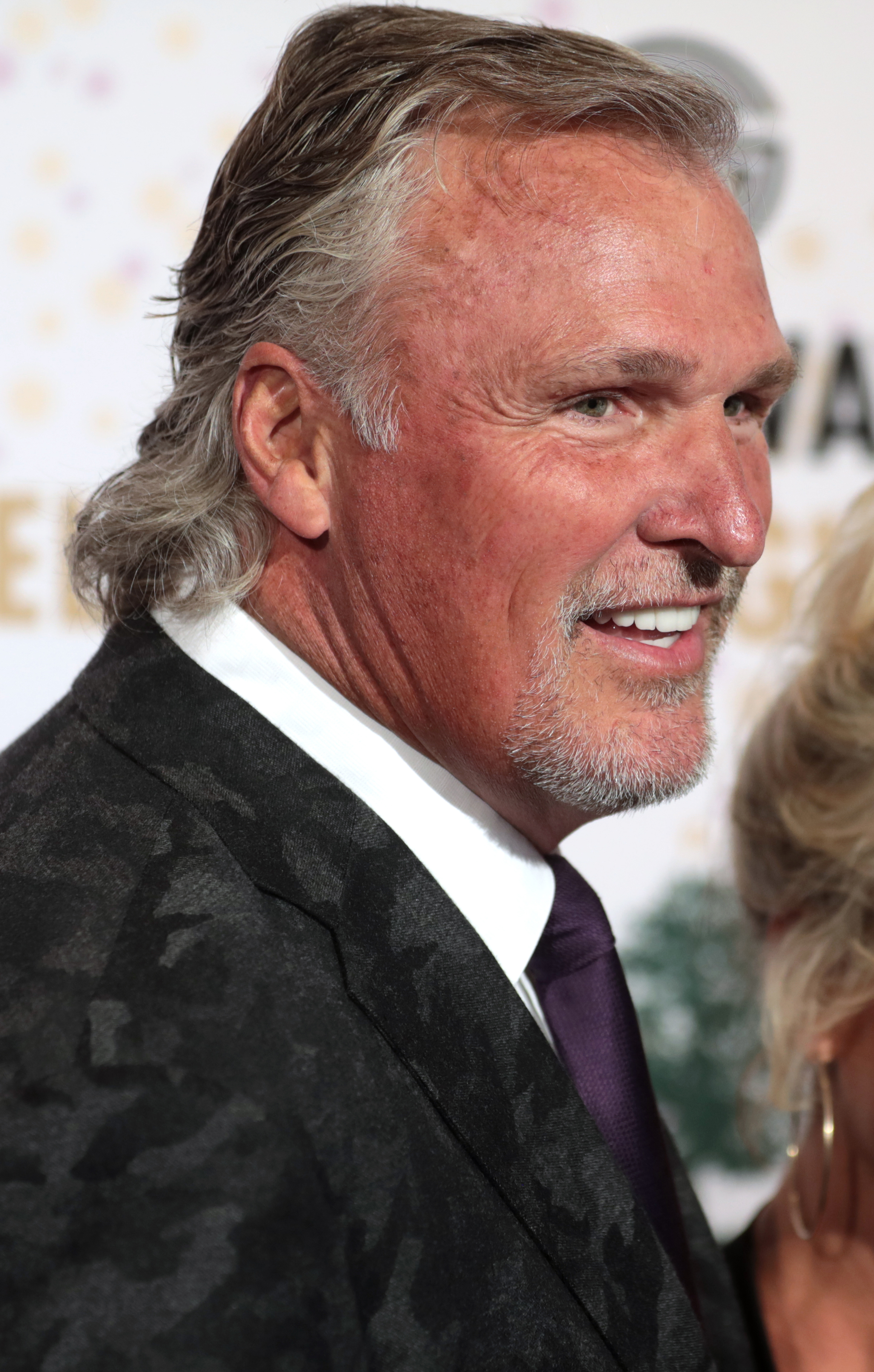
- Chambers in Phoenix for the 2022 Gateway Celebrity Fight Night

Personal information
- Born: June 21, 1959 (age 67) Ogden, Utah, U.S.
- Listed height: 6 ft 10 in (2.08 m)
- Listed weight: 220 lb (100 kg)

Career information
- High school: Fairview (Boulder, Colorado)
- College: Utah (1977–1981)
- NBA draft: 1981: 1st round, 8th overall pick
- Drafted by: San Diego Clippers
- Playing career: 1981–1997
- Position: Power forward
- Number: 8, 22, 24, 42, 25

Career history
- 1981–1983: San Diego Clippers
- 1983–1988: Seattle SuperSonics
- 1988–1993: Phoenix Suns
- 1993–1995: Utah Jazz
- 1995–1996: Maccabi Tel Aviv
- 1997: Charlotte Hornets
- 1997: Philadelphia 76ers

Career highlights
- 4× NBA All-Star (1987, 1989–1991); NBA All-Star Game MVP (1987); 2× All-NBA Second Team (1989, 1990); Israeli League champion (1996); No. 24 retired by Phoenix Suns; First-team All-WAC (1981); 2× Second-team All-WAC (1979, 1980); No. 42 retired by Utah Utes

Career NBA statistics
- Points: 20,049 (18.1 ppg)
- Rebounds: 6,703 (6.1 rpg)
- Assists: 2,283 (2.1 apg)
- Stats at NBA.com
- Stats at Basketball Reference

Thomas Doane Chambers (born June 21, 1959) is an American former professional basketball player. He played 16 seasons in the National Basketball Association (NBA), where he was a four-time NBA All-Star. He was a two-time All-NBA Second Team selection during his career. He played for the San Diego Clippers, Seattle Supersonics, Phoenix Suns, Utah Jazz, Charlotte Hornets, and Philadelphia 76ers.

A key offensive threat at the power forward position, Chambers bloomed in Seattle by averaging 20 points per game in his five seasons with the team. With the advancement of league agreement over free agency, Chambers became the first unrestricted free agent in league history, and he soon signed with the Suns. With encouragement to shoot the ball profusely, Chambers peaked with 27 points per game in the 1989–90 season. He made his only appearance in the NBA Finals in 1993 while being used as a sixth man option and departed the Suns for Utah in free agency. He played two seasons with the team off the bench but became the 24th player to score 20,000 career points in NBA history, doing so in 1996. Internationally, he played one season with Maccabi Tel Aviv, winning the Israeli League. He closed out his career with spot appearances for Charlotte and Philadelphia before retiring in 1997. Chambers was inducted into the Phoenix Suns Ring of Honor in 1999 and his number was later formally retired by the team.

In December 2021, he was nominated as a first-time finalist for the Naismith Memorial Basketball Hall of Fame but was not elected. He is one of two eligible players with 20,000 career points to not be a member of the Hall of Fame, alongside Antawn Jamison. but did not advance to the list of finalists. Currently, Chambers works for the Suns as a community relations representative.

== Early life ==
Thomas Doane Chambers was born on June 21, 1959 in Ogden, Utah. He grew up in Utah but spent his junior year of high school at Aurora Central in Aurora, Colorado after his father found a job that necessitated a move. Hailing from an athletic family, Chambers was a promising 6-2 guard at the end of his sophomore year. Suddenly, he grew six inches during the next six months. As a junior, teammates marveled that he had not lost any coordination with his growth. A new job opportunity came up during the year that saw the family move to Boulder, Colorado prior to his senior year of high school. Chambers starred at Fairview High School for his senior year and led the state in scoring. He scored 50 points with 22 rebounds in his final high school game. A broken wrist as a senior forced him to use his left hand more, improving his game. An all-Colorado high school player, he was hotly recruited and enrolled at Utah.

== College career ==
At Utah, Chambers played center with star forward Danny Vranes. The two led successful teams in the Western Athletic Conference. He ran the floor well and had good shooting range. On February 5, 2022, Chambers' jersey and number, 42, were retired during the Utes' game against Oregon. At the NBA level, he moved to the power forward position.

== Professional career ==
=== San Diego Clippers (1981–1983) ===
Chambers was drafted by the San Diego Clippers (now the Los Angeles Clippers) with the 8th pick in the 1981 NBA draft. After signing a $1.5 million four-year contract, he played at forward for the first time after being a center in college. On the injury-riddled young Clippers roster his rookie year, Chambers ended up the team's top scorer at 17.2 points per game, and he made 52.5% of his shots. He logged his first career 30-point game (November 7) and first double-double (November 12) in his first six games as a player. On April 15, 1982, he set a then-career-high points total of 39 points in a 129–123 win against the Portland Trail Blazers.

The next season, on October 29, 1982, Chambers scored 29 points and grabbed 16 rebounds in San Diego's home opener, a loss to the Phoenix Suns. In the same season, the team had drafted power forward Terry Cummings, who was the Rookie of the Year that year, and the club felt it had to choose between the two young prospects. They traded Chambers and Al Wood for James Donaldson, Greg Kelser, Mark Radford, a 1984 first-round draft pick (Michael Cage was later selected) and a 1985 2nd round draft pick (Calvin Duncan was later selected).

=== Seattle SuperSonics (1983–1988) ===
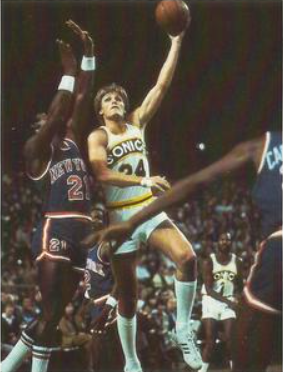
1983 card of Chambers for Seattle SuperSonics

Teaming with center Jack Sikma and guard Gus Williams, Chambers became a key piece to a winning team in his third NBA season. He played all 82 games and averaged 18.1 points per game. In 1983, though, Williams was traded, and the point guard who starred was Gerald Henderson. After posting a team-high 21.5 points per game the season before, Chambers fell to third-most on the team in shot attempts, taking only 28 more shots more than Henderson that season. He still led the team at 18.5 points per game, but felt he was being passed around in the offense.

1986–87, however, was a big season for Chambers. Rookie Nate McMillan took over Henderson's spot and Chambers became one of three key scorers for the Sonics. He posted 23.3 points per game to reach All-Star status for the first time. Chambers made 85% of 630 free throw tries that season. He also again played all 82 games. In the 1987 NBA All-Star Game, Chambers was a late selection to the game, having been inserted as an injury replacement for Ralph Sampson, who tore his knee the week before the game. In the game itself, played in Seattle, Chambers scored 34 points on 13-of-25 shooting (leading the way in shots taken) and was named the Most Valuable Player of the game. In five seasons with the SuperSonics, he averaged 20.4 points, 6.6 rebounds, and 2.4 assists.

=== Phoenix Suns (1988–1993) ===
An avid hunter and horseback rider, Chambers had no interest in playing outside of the western United States. At the end of the 1987-88 season, Chambers was advised by the players union head Larry Fleisher to not accept the qualifying offer by Seattle because of the possibility of getting "unrestricted free agency". Not long after, a new collective bargaining agreement came that would give this classification for those who had played in the league at least seven years and played through two NBA contracts. Chambers subsequently signed a lucrative contract with the Phoenix Suns that summer as the first of the unrestricted free agent bargains. He subsequently made three All-Star appearances as a Suns player.

In Phoenix, coach Cotton Fitzsimmons expected Chambers to shoot the ball. In the 1988–89 season, Chambers scored 25.7 points per game. The following season saw him peak with 27.2 points per game. Just as his scoring hit new highs, his team also improved. Point guard Kevin Johnson was the passer Chambers had long-awaited, and the duo became an outstanding NBA tandem. On March 24, 1990, Chambers scored a Suns-franchise-record 60 points during a win over his former team the Sonics, while playing through a hamstring injury.

Former Seattle teammate, Xavier McDaniel, joined the team in 1990–91, and the now 31-year-old Chambers again accepted a more team-oriented role for the Suns. He had been twice named All-NBA Second Team, but now just tried to fit in. The arrival of head coach Paul Westphal, combined with the acquisition of Charles Barkley for the 1992–93 season saw Chambers play mostly off the bench as a sixth man due to the glut of forwards with Barkley, Richard Dumas, Cedric Ceballos, and Chambers, with Westphal not regarding Chambers as a "true small forward". Chambers noted his feelings about his relationship with Westphal in an interview after departing Phoenix:

Paul is a real creative coach and will do a lot of different things. But he just wasn't comfortable with me. I think that's one of the reasons why I didn't play as well. I was always second-guessing myself. I'm not good at that. When a coach is confident in me, I usually perform pretty well. When there are doubts, I don't do a great job.

Chambers struggled in parts of the 1993 playoff run, later stating he "looked awful". An injury to Ceballos led to Chambers getting his first (and only) start of the playoffs, where he logged 17 points in 29 minutes in Game 7 of the Western Conference Finals against Seattle as the Suns won 123-110 to reach their first Finals since 1976. In the Finals versus the two-time defending champion Chicago Bulls, Chambers played 20 minutes each in Game 2, 3 and 4 and played a key role in Game 3 by hitting the tying lay-up to force double OT in a game the Suns won in triple overtime. He had 12 points in Game 6, which saw the Suns lose on a three-pointer late as Chicago won their third straight title. In the last game of the series, and in what would be the last game of his Suns tenure, Chambers scored 12 points in a 99–98 Game 6 loss.

=== Utah Jazz ===
Chambers had added an option year into his contract and deferred money to help the Suns try to sign Danny Ainge. Quickly after the Finals loss, the Suns declined his option year, making him a free agent. Feeling that he still could play a high level, he signed with the Utah Jazz on a two-year deal that would see him play alongside Karl Malone and former Suns teammate Jeff Hornacek as another scoring option that could deliver some mobility. The Jazz improved immediately and made it to the 1994 Western Conference Finals.

The 1994-95 season saw him average just six points per game despite appearing in 81 games. On April 15, 1995, playing against the Los Angeles Clippers, Chambers became the 24th player with 20,000 career points, doing so on a layup in the second quarter. (Note: At the time, The Los Angeles Times called him the 20th player to reach the mark of 20,000 points as an NBA player. Basketball Reference recognizes the statistics of the ABA in their listings (whereupon Dan Issel, Julius Erving, Artis Gilmore, and Rick Barry would all be part of the 20,000 point club) while the NBA site does not do so.)

=== Maccabi Tel Aviv (1995–1996) ===
Chambers joined Maccabi Tel Aviv in Israel, for a season of play in the Israeli Super League and the FIBA EuroLeague, during the 1995–96 season. He signed a one-year contract with the Israeli club for a reported $500,000 that made him the highest paid player in Israel. In the Israeli Super League, Chambers averaged 17.7 points, 6.3 rebounds, and 2.3 assists per game. He also won the Israeli League championship that season with Maccabi. In the FIBA EuroLeague's 1995–96 season, Chambers averaged 15.1 points, 6.8 rebounds, 1.5 assists, and 0.7 steals per game, in 32.8 minutes per game.

=== Charlotte Hornets (1997) ===
After his stint in Israel, Chambers signed a contract with the Charlotte Hornets. He played twelve games with the Hornets but was waived in April 1997 with the return of Anthony Mason to the team.

=== Philadelphia 76ers (1997) ===
Chambers played in one more NBA game, with the Philadelphia 76ers, during the 1997–98 regular season before retiring. In the last game of his career which was against the Cleveland Cavaliers, played on November 26, 1997, he had six points. He also had two rebounds, and two steals for the 76ers, in his only appearance with the team.

== Player profile and legacy ==
Chambers appeared in 16 NBA seasons as a member of the San Diego Clippers, Seattle SuperSonics, Phoenix Suns, Utah Jazz, Charlotte Hornets, and Philadelphia 76ers. He scored 20,049 total points in the NBA for a career average of 18.1 points per game. His career high was a 60-point performance with the Suns against the Sonics on March 24, 1990. He appeared in four NBA All-Star Games during his career (1987, 1989, 1990, and 1991), earning game MVP honors in 1987 after scoring 34 points. He also played in the 1993 NBA Finals as a member of the Suns, but the team lost to the Chicago Bulls. He is one of just two players (alongside Antawn Jamison) currently eligible for induction into the Basketball Hall of Fame who have scored 20,000 points and who have not been inducted. In the timespan of his career, Chambers was one of just eight players with 20,000 points.

Chambers was inducted into the Phoenix Suns Ring of Honor in April 1999 and became the first inductee since the Ring of Honor was installed at America West Arena (now Footprint Center). As part of the induction ceremony, he received a bronze statue by artist Sam Wickey recreating his 1989 dunk over the New York Knicks guard Mark Jackson. Chambers was also honored by being inducted into the Utah Sports Hall of Fame in 2010 and the Arizona Sports Hall of Fame in 2019.

== NBA career statistics ==
Legend
GP	Games played	GS	Games started	MPG	Minutes per game
FG%	Field goal percentage	3P%	3-point field goal percentage	FT%	Free throw percentage
RPG	Rebounds per game	APG	Assists per game	SPG	Steals per game
BPG	Blocks per game	PPG	Points per game	**Bold**	Career high

=== Regular season ===
Year	Team	GP	GS	MPG	FG%	3P%	FT%	RPG	APG	SPG	BPG	PPG
1981–82	San Diego	81	58	33.1	.525	.000	.620	6.9	1.8	0.7	0.6	17.2
1982–83	San Diego	79	79	33.7	.472	.000	.723	6.6	2.4	1.0	**0.7**	17.6
1983–84	Seattle	**82**	44	31.3	.499	.000	.800	6.5	1.6	0.6	0.6	18.1
1984–85	Seattle	81	60	36.1	.483	.273	.832	7.1	2.6	0.9	**0.7**	21.5
1985–86	Seattle	66	26	30.6	.466	.271	.836	6.5	2.0	0.8	0.6	18.5
1986–87	Seattle	**82**	**82**	36.8	.456	.372	.849	6.6	**3.0**	1.0	0.6	23.3
1987–88	Seattle	**82**	**82**	32.7	.448	.303	.807	6.0	2.6	1.1	0.6	20.4
1988–89	Phoenix	81	81	37.1	.471	.326	.851	**8.4**	2.9	1.1	0.7	25.7
1989–90	Phoenix	81	81	**37.6**	.501	.279	.861	7.0	2.3	1.1	0.6	**27.2**
1990–91	Phoenix	76	75	32.6	.437	.274	.826	6.4	2.6	0.9	**0.7**	19.9
1991–92	Phoenix	69	66	28.2	.431	.367	.830	5.8	2.1	0.8	0.5	16.3
1992–93	Phoenix	73	0	23.6	.447	.393	.837	4.7	1.4	0.6	0.3	12.2
1993–94	Utah	80	0	23.0	.440	.311	.786	4.1	1.0	0.5	0.4	11.2
1994–95	Utah	80	4	15.3	.457	.167	.807	2.6	0.9	0.3	0.4	6.2
1996–97	Charlotte	12	5	6.9	.226	**.667**	.750	1.2	0.3	0.1	0.0	1.6
1997–98	Philadelphia	1	0	10.0	**1.000**	—	**1.000**	2.0	0.0	**2.0**	0.0	6.0
Career		1,107	743	30.6	.468	.307	.807	6.1	2.1	0.8	0.6	18.1
All-Star		4	1	21.0	.518	.400	.773	4.0	1.3	1.5	0.0	19.3

=== Playoffs ===
Year	Team	GP	GS	MPG	FG%	3P%	FT%	RPG	APG	SPG	BPG	PPG
1984	Seattle	5	—	38.2	.475	.000	.667	6.6	1.6	1.0	0.6	13.6
1987	Seattle	14	14	35.6	.449	.333	.808	6.4	2.3	0.9	0.9	23.0
1988	Seattle	5	5	33.6	.**549**	.000	.829	6.2	2.2	0.6	0.2	25.8
1989	Phoenix	12	12	**41.3**	.459	.409	.859	**10.9**	**3.8**	1.1	**1.3**	**26.0**
1990	Phoenix	16	**16**	38.3	.425	.263	**.879**	6.7	1.9	0.4	0.4	22.2
1991	Phoenix	4	4	35.5	.409	.000	.737	5.8	2.5	**1.8**	**1.3**	17.0
1992	Phoenix	7	0	27.7	.459	**.571**	.844	4.4	2.7	0.3	0.7	15.6
1993	Phoenix	**24**	1	15.7	.388	.400	.815	2.7	0.5	0.3	0.4	7.3
1994	Utah	16	0	20.3	.361	.000	.793	2.8	0.8	0.3	0.6	5.8
1995	Utah	5	0	12.0	.500	.333	.692	2.6	0.4	0.4	0.0	6.4
Career		108	52	28.3	.440	.303	.827	5.3	1.7	0.6	0.6	15.4

== Personal life ==
His twin sons Dakota and Colton played college basketball for the College of Southern Idaho.

After his playing career ended, Chambers bought a ranch in North Ogden south of Brigham City, Utah for himself and his family which became known as Shooting Star Ranch. Soon after that, he became a community relations representative for the Suns, sold his ranch in Ogden, and moved permanently to Scottsdale, Arizona with his family. He subsequently became a studio host for the Suns.

He won a Rocky Mountain Emmy alongside senior editor Tommy Arguelles for their work on Sunderella Suns, a film commemorating the 40th anniversary of the 1975–76 Phoenix Suns season and the impact that the season had on the state of Arizona overall.

== See also ==
- List of NBA career personal fouls leaders
- List of NBA career free throw scoring leaders
- List of NBA retired numbers
- List of NBA single-game scoring leaders
