= Russ Schoene =

American basketball player and coach

Personal information
- Born: April 16, 1960 (age 66) Trenton, Illinois, U.S.
- Listed height: 6 ft 10 in (2.08 m)
- Listed weight: 210 lb (95 kg)

Career information
- High school: Wesclin (Trenton, Illinois)
- College: Mineral Area (1978–1980); Chattanooga (1980–1982)
- NBA draft: 1982: 2nd round, 45th overall pick
- Drafted by: Philadelphia 76ers
- Playing career: 1982–1994
- Position: Power forward
- Number: 3, 40

Career history
- 1982–1983: Philadelphia 76ers
- 1983: Indiana Pacers
- 1984–1986: Simac Olímpia Milano
- 1986–1989: Seattle SuperSonics
- 1989–1992: Glaxo Verona
- 1992–1993: Yoga Napoli
- 1993: Rapid City Thrillers
- 1994: Buckler Bologna

Career highlights
- Coppa Italia champion (1991)
- Stats at NBA.com
- Stats at Basketball Reference

Russ Schoene (/ˈʃeɪni/ SHAY-nee; born April 16, 1960) is an American former professional basketball player and former assistant men's basketball coach at the University of Washington.

Schoene starred at the University of Tennessee at Chattanooga, where the 6-10 forward led the team to two straight Southern Conference championships (1981 and 1982) and an NCAA tournament appearance in 1982. As a senior, he averaged 13.6 points and 7 rebounds a game, and earned league tournament MVP honors.

The Philadelphia 76ers selected Schoene in the second round of the 1982 NBA draft (45th pick overall). He was traded along with a 1983 first-rounder (23rd overall–Mitchell Wiggins) and a 1984 second-rounder (29th overall–Stuart Gray) from the 76ers to the Indiana Pacers for Clemon Johnson and a 1984 third-rounder (48th overall–Georgia forward James Banks) during his rookie campaign on February 15, 1983. He stayed in Indianapolis until the end of the 1983–84 season.

During the 1984–85 and 1985–86 seasons, Schoene played for Olimpia Simac Milano of the Italian league, where his teammates included former Los Angeles Lakers head coach Mike D'Antoni and former NBA All-Star Joe Barry Carroll. The team won the Korać Cup in 1985, and Schoene was named the Italian League MVP in 1986.

On October 2, 1986, the Seattle SuperSonics acquired the rights to Schoene, along with guard Terence Stansbury and "future considerations," in return for guard John Long. Schoene made the Sonics squad, and spent the next three seasons with the team. As a designated off-the-bench shooter in Seattle, he earned the nickname "Catch and Shoot," firing a career-high 38.2% from three-point range in 1988–89. He scored a career-high 20 points on three occasions. Arguably his best NBA game was on April 24, 1988, when he had 20 points, four rebounds, a steal, an assist, and no turnovers in 33 minutes against the Los Angeles Clippers. Schoene wore #40 as a Sonic.

Following the 1988–89 season, he accepted a three-year, $2.4 million contract offer to play for Glaxo Verona in the Italian League. He played in Italy for five seasons, and led Glaxo Verona to win the Coppa Italia trophy in 1991. In 1993, the Sacramento Kings waived him prior to the start of the season. At the end of his professional career, he spent time with the Rapid City Thrillers of the Continental Basketball Association.

His career NBA statistics include 1,491 points (5.1 ppg), 735 rebounds (2.5 rpg), and 175 assists (0.6 apg).

Schoene joined the Washington Huskies men's basketball coaching staff in 2002, following five years as an assistant at Bellevue Community College. He left the team to focus on Samurai Sam's following the 2003-04 campaign.

== Career statistics ==
Legend
GP	Games played	GS	Games started	MPG	Minutes per game
FG%	Field goal percentage	3P%	3-point field goal percentage	FT%	Free throw percentage
RPG	Rebounds per game	APG	Assists per game	SPG	Steals per game
BPG	Blocks per game	PPG	Points per game	**Bold**	Career high

=== NBA ===
==== Regular season ====
Year	Team	GP	GS	MPG	FG%	3P%	FT%	RPG	APG	SPG	BPG	PPG
1982–83	Philadelphia	46	2	15.3	**.512**	.000	.750	**3.3**	.7	.3	.2	5.1
1982–83	Indiana	31	**5**	**16.8**	.443	.333	.727	**3.3**	**.9**	.4	**.5**	**7.8**
1986–87	Seattle	63	0	9.2	.374	.154	.630	1.9	.4	.3	.2	2.7
1987–88	Seattle	**81**	2	12.0	.458	.293	**.810**	2.4	.7	**.5**	.2	6.0
1988–89	Seattle	69	1	11.2	.387	**.382**	.807	2.4	.5	**.5**	.3	5.2
Career		290	10	12.2	.435	.335	.751	2.5	.6	.4	.2	5.1

==== Playoffs ====
Year	Team	GP	GS	MPG	FG%	3P%	FT%	RPG	APG	SPG	BPG	PPG
1987	Seattle	**14**	0	8.8	.357	.333	.750	**1.9**	.2	.1	**.3**	2.2
1988	Seattle	5	0	7.8	**.583**	**.500**	–	1.4	.4	.2	.0	3.2
1989	Seattle	3	0	**14.3**	.235	.000	**.833**	1.7	**.7**	**.7**	.0	**4.3**
Career		22	0	9.3	.368	.235	.778	1.7	.3	.2	.2	2.7
