= Dale Ellis =

American basketball player (born 1960)

Personal information
- Born: August 6, 1960 (age 66) Marietta, Georgia, U.S.
- Listed height: 6 ft 7 in (2.01 m)
- Listed weight: 205 lb (93 kg)

Career information
- High school: Marietta (Marietta, Georgia)
- College: Tennessee (1979–1983)
- NBA draft: 1983: 1st round, 9th overall pick
- Drafted by: Dallas Mavericks
- Playing career: 1983–2000
- Position: Small forward / shooting guard
- Number: 14, 3, 9, 2

Career history
- 1983–1986: Dallas Mavericks
- 1986–1991: Seattle SuperSonics
- 1991–1992: Milwaukee Bucks
- 1992–1994: San Antonio Spurs
- 1994–1997: Denver Nuggets
- 1997–1999: Seattle SuperSonics
- 1999–2000: Milwaukee Bucks
- 2000: Charlotte Hornets

Career highlights
- NBA All-Star (1989); All-NBA Third Team (1989); NBA Most Improved Player (1987); NBA Three-Point Contest champion (1989); Consensus first-team All-American (1983); Consensus second-team All-American (1982); 2× SEC Player of the Year (1982, 1983); 2x First-team All-SEC (1982, 1983); No. 14 retired by Tennessee Volunteers; Fourth-team Parade All-American (1979)

Career NBA statistics
- Points: 19,004 (15.7 ppg)
- Rebounds: 4,201 (3.5 rpg)
- Assists: 1,746 (1.4 apg)
- Stats at NBA.com
- Stats at Basketball Reference

Dale Ellis (born August 6, 1960) is an American former professional basketball player who played in the National Basketball Association (NBA). At various points in his career, Ellis held the record for the most career 3-point field goals made, until Reggie Miller surpassed him. His 1,719 career made three-pointers ranked 2nd in NBA history at the time of his retirement, and ranks 38th in NBA history as of September 2026. He also holds the record for most minutes played in a single game with 69 minutes.

== Playing career ==
After his time at the University of Tennessee, Ellis was selected ninth overall in the 1983 NBA draft by the Dallas Mavericks. His time as a shooting guard with the Mavericks was rather unremarkable as he played scant minutes and was often relegated to sitting on the bench.

Ellis' fortunes changed dramatically after he found himself traded to the Seattle SuperSonics for Al Wood on July 23, 1986. His playing time increased significantly, and his regular season scoring average reflected this as it jumped from 7.1 points per game with the Mavericks to 24.9 points per game with the SuperSonics. In his Seattle debut, Ellis scored 23 points and grabbed 4 rebounds in a 127–110 win over the Trail Blazers. Ellis' rise with the SuperSonics was recognized around the league, which awarded him the NBA Most Improved Player Award in 1987.

Ellis continued to star for the SuperSonics in the late 1980s. He became the first player in NBA history to complete two four-point plays in one game in a win against the Sacramento Kings on January 26, 1988. His scoring average peaked at 27.5 points per game during the 1988–89 season, which would be a career high. That season, on January 5, Ellis scored 49 points in a 120–106 victory over the Kings. The 2,253 points he scored that season broke Spencer Haywood's franchise record of 2,251. Ellis was selected to the NBA All-Star Game during the same season, and scored 27 points for the West. Despite success in Seattle, Ellis' tenure was tumultuous, and included a drunk driving incident in which he was hospitalized, a fist fight with teammate Xavier McDaniel, and a bizarre fight between Ellis' wife, Monique Ellis, and Alton Lister's wife. In all, Ellis spent four and a half seasons with the SuperSonics before once again being traded, this time to the Milwaukee Bucks for Ricky Pierce. While he was again a bench player with the Bucks, his minutes still remained relatively high and Ellis still made large contributions to the team with his scoring ability. Following the conclusion of the 91–92 season, he found himself traded to the San Antonio Spurs for Tracy Murray. As a member of the Spurs, Ellis once again found himself in the starting lineup playing slightly more minutes than he did as a Buck. Although his production largely remained the same, he was doing it more efficiently, shooting nearly 50% from the field as opposed to 46% with Milwaukee.

After signing with the Denver Nuggets, and then later in his career traded to the SuperSonics once again, the Orlando Magic (for whom he never played), again to the Bucks, and the Charlotte Hornets, he saw a more reduced playing role. The Hornets traded him to the Miami Heat after the 1999–2000 season; but was waived prior to the start of the next season.

Ellis played in 1,209 games and had career averages of 15.7 points per game, 3.5 rebounds per game, a .479 field goal percentage, and a .403 three point field goal percentage. He set the NBA record for most minutes played in a single game when he scored 53 points in 69 minutes (out of a possible 73) for the SuperSonics in a 155–154 quintuple-overtime loss to the Bucks on November 9, 1989. His 1,719 career made three-pointers ranked second in NBA history at the time of his retirement.

== NBA career statistics ==
Legend
GP	Games played	GS	Games started	MPG	Minutes per game
FG%	Field goal percentage	3P%	3-point field goal percentage	FT%	Free throw percentage
RPG	Rebounds per game	APG	Assists per game	SPG	Steals per game
BPG	Blocks per game	PPG	Points per game	**Bold**	Career high

*	Led the league

=== Regular season ===
Year	Team	GP	GS	MPG	FG%	3P%	FT%	RPG	APG	SPG	BPG	PPG
1983–84	Dallas	67	2	15.8	.456	.414	.719	3.7	.8	.6	.1	8.2
1984–85	Dallas	72	4	18.3	.454	.385	.740	3.3	.8	.6	.1	9.3
1985–86	Dallas	72	1	15.1	.411	.364	.720	2.3	.5	.6	.1	7.1
1986–87	Seattle	**82**	76	37.5	**.516**	.358	.787	**5.5**	**2.9**	**1.3**	**.4**	24.9
1987–88	Seattle	75	73	37.2	.503	.413	.767	4.5	2.6	1.0	.1	25.8
1988–89	Seattle	**82**	**82**	**38.9**	.501	**.478**	.816	4.2	2.0	**1.3**	.3	**27.5**
1989–90	Seattle	55	49	37.0	.497	.375	.818	4.3	2.0	1.1	.1	23.5
1990–91	Seattle	30	24	26.7	.463	.303	.738	3.1	2.1	1.1	.1	15.0
1990–91	Milwaukee	21	0	29.7	.486	.441	.707	3.9	1.5	.8	.2	19.3
1991–92	Milwaukee	81	11	27.0	.469	.419	.774	3.1	1.3	.7	.2	15.7
1992–93	San Antonio	**82**	76	33.3	.499	.401	.797	3.8	1.3	1.0	.2	16.7
1993–94	San Antonio	77	75	33.6	.494	.395	.776	3.3	1.0	.9	.1	15.2
1994–95	Denver	81	3	24.6	.453	.403	**.866**	2.7	.7	.5	.1	11.3
1995–96	Denver	81	52	32.4	.479	.412	.760	3.9	1.7	.7	.1	14.9
1996–97	Denver	**82**	51	35.9	.414	.364	.817	3.6	2.0	.7	.1	16.6
1997–98	Seattle	79	0	24.5	.497	.464*	.782	2.3	1.1	.8	.1	11.8
1998–99	Seattle	48	5	25.7	.441	.433	.757	2.4	.8	.5	.1	10.3
1999–00	Milwaukee	18	0	18.0	.465	.354	.667	1.9	.3	.3	.0	6.8
1999–00	Charlotte	24	5	10.0	.328	.400	.750	.9	.3	.3	.0	2.3
Career		1,209	589	28.8	.479	.403	.784	3.5	1.4	.8	.2	15.7
All-Star		1	1	26.0	.750	1.000	1.000	6.0	2.0	.0	.0	27.0

=== Playoffs ===
Year	Team	GP	GS	MPG	FG%	3P%	FT%	RPG	APG	SPG	BPG	PPG
1984	Dallas	8	–	22.3	.325	.083	.750	5.3	.5	1.3	.3	7.4
1985	Dallas	4	1	17.0	.435	.400	.500	1.8	.8	1.0	.0	5.8
1986	Dallas	7	0	9.6	.409	**.583**	**1.000**	1.0	.3	.3	.3	4.3
1987	Seattle	**14**	**14**	37.9	**.487**	.361	.815	**6.4**	2.6	.7	**.4**	**25.2**
1988	Seattle	5	5	34.4	.482	.250	.724	4.6	**3.0**	.6	**.4**	20.8
1989	Seattle	8	8	**38.0**	.450	.405	.727	4.0	1.3	**1.4**	.1	22.9
1993	San Antonio	10	10	30.5	.451	.313	.813	3.5	1.1	.4	.0	12.5
1994	San Antonio	4	4	28.5	.395	.294	.600	2.5	.3	.8	.0	10.5
1995	Denver	3	0	24.3	.357	.308	.923	4.7	1.0	.7	.3	12.0
1998	Seattle	10	0	17.0	.377	.423	.833	1.3	.6	.2	.0	5.6
Career		73	42	27.1	.443	.351	.784	3.7	1.3	.7	.2	13.8

== See also ==
- List of NBA career 3-point scoring leaders
- List of NBA career 3-point field goal percentage leaders
- List of NBA career games played leaders
