= 1983 NBA Finals =

1983 basketball championship series

Team	Coach	Wins
Philadelphia 76ers	Billy Cunningham	4
Los Angeles Lakers	Pat Riley	0
- Dates: May 22–31
- MVP: Moses Malone (Philadelphia 76ers)
- Hall of Famers: 76ers: Maurice Cheeks (2018); Julius Erving (1993); Bobby Jones (2019); Moses Malone (2001); Lakers: Kareem Abdul-Jabbar (1995); Michael Cooper (2024); Magic Johnson (2002); Bob McAdoo (2000); Jamaal Wilkes (2012); James Worthy (2003; did not play); Coaches: Billy Cunningham (1986, player); Pat Riley (2008); Broadcasters: Chick Hearn (2003, contributor); Officials: Hugh Evans (2022); Darell Garretson (2016); Earl Strom (1995)
- Eastern finals: 76ers defeated Bucks, 4–1
- Western finals: Lakers defeated Spurs, 4–2

The 1983 NBA World Championship Series, also known as Showdown '83, was the championship round of the National Basketball Association (NBA)'s 1982–83 season, and the culmination of the season's playoffs. It was the last NBA Championship Series completed before June 1. The Eastern Conference champion Philadelphia 76ers swept the Western Conference champion Los Angeles Lakers to win their third NBA championship and first since 1967. After losing their previous four final meetings, including the year prior, the 76ers returned the favor.

76ers center Moses Malone was named the NBA Finals Most Valuable Player (MVP). This, along with the 1989 NBA Finals, were the only two NBA championships of the 1980s not to be won by either the Lakers or the Boston Celtics; every NBA Finals of that decade featured either the Lakers or Celtics, and sometimes both (1984, 1985, 1987). Coincidentally, the Lakers were also swept in the 1989 NBA Finals, that time by the Detroit Pistons.

== Background ==
=== Philadelphia 76ers ===
The 76ers lost their first two Finals meetings with the Lakers in 1980 and 1982. While Julius Erving played superbly in both series, their frontcourt of Darryl Dawkins, Caldwell Jones, and Bobby Jones couldn't neutralize Kareem Abdul-Jabbar. So in the off-season, the 76ers acquired Moses Malone from the Houston Rockets in an effort to counter Abdul-Jabbar, in addition to providing some offense and rebounding to the team. They parted ways with Caldwell Jones, Dawkins, and Lionel Hollins before the season, while giving greater responsibility to high-scoring guard Andrew Toney and backup playmaker Clint Richardson, and adding forwards Clemon Johnson and rookie Marc Iavaroni.

Malone's acquisition paid dividends, as the 76ers won 65 games in the 1982–83 NBA season. Prior to the playoffs, Malone predicted the team would win in four games in each of the three rounds, ending it with the statement Fo, Fo, Fo. The 76ers would steamroll through the playoffs, sweeping the New York Knicks 4–0 in the conference semifinals, before overcoming the Milwaukee Bucks in five games.

=== Los Angeles Lakers ===
The Lakers earned the top pick of the 1982 NBA draft, becoming the only defending champion to earn the top overall pick in the same season. This was because Cleveland Cavaliers owner Ted Stepien traded their first round pick and Butch Lee to the Lakers for Don Ford and draft pick Chad Kinch three years earlier. Because the Cavaliers earned the worst record at 15–67, they would have earned the top overall pick via a coin toss with the 17–65 San Diego Clippers. Instead, the Lakers would earn the top pick and ultimately selected future Hall of Famer James Worthy first overall.

The Lakers won 58 games the next season. Worthy was a strong contender for Rookie of the Year when he broke his leg late in the season, therefore missing the rest of the season and the playoffs. Despite Worthy's absence, Magic Johnson, already a top-level guard, and Kareem Abdul-Jabbar, 35 and still in his prime, led the Lakers back to the Finals. They beat the Portland Trail Blazers 4–1 and the San Antonio Spurs 4–2 in the second and third playoff rounds, respectively.

=== Road to the Finals ===
Los Angeles Lakers (Western Conference champion)		Philadelphia 76ers (Eastern Conference champion)
# / Western Conference; # / Team / W / L / PCT / GB; 1 / c-Los Angeles Lakers / 58 / 24 / .707 / –; 2 / y-San Antonio Spurs / 53 / 29 / .646 / 5; 3 / x-Phoenix Suns / 53 / 29 / .646 / 5; 4 / x-Seattle SuperSonics / 48 / 34 / .585 / 10; 5 / x-Portland Trail Blazers / 46 / 36 / .561 / 12; 6 / x-Denver Nuggets / 45 / 37 / .549 / 13; 7 / Kansas City Kings / 45 / 37 / .549 / 13; 8 / Dallas Mavericks / 38 / 44 / .463 / 20; 9 / Utah Jazz / 30 / 52 / .366 / 28; 9 / Golden State Warriors / 30 / 52 / .366 / 28; 11 / San Diego Clippers / 25 / 57 / .305 / 33; 12 / Houston Rockets / 14 / 68 / .171 / 44; 1st seed in the West, 2nd best league record	Regular season	# / Eastern Conference; # / Team / W / L / PCT / GB; 1 / z-Philadelphia 76ers / 65 / 17 / .793 / –; 2 / y-Milwaukee Bucks / 51 / 31 / .622 / 14; 3 / x-Boston Celtics / 56 / 26 / .683 / 9; 4 / x-New Jersey Nets / 49 / 33 / .598 / 16; 5 / x-New York Knicks / 44 / 38 / .537 / 21; 6 / x-Atlanta Hawks / 43 / 39 / .524 / 22; 7 / Washington Bullets / 42 / 40 / .512 / 23; 8 / Detroit Pistons / 37 / 45 / .451 / 28; 9 / Chicago Bulls / 28 / 54 / .341 / 37; 10 / Cleveland Cavaliers / 23 / 59 / .280 / 42; 11 / Indiana Pacers / 20 / 62 / .244 / 45; 1st seed in the East, best league record
Earned first-round bye	First round	Earned first-round bye
Defeated the (5) Portland Trail Blazers, 4–1	Conference semifinals	Defeated the (5) New York Knicks, 4–0
Defeated the (2) San Antonio Spurs, 4–2	Conference finals	Defeated the (2) Milwaukee Bucks, 4–1

=== Regular season series ===
The Philadelphia 76ers won both games in the regular season series:

December 5, 1982

Philadelphia 76ers 114, Los Angeles Lakers 104

The Forum, Inglewood, California

January 5, 1983

Los Angeles Lakers 120, Philadelphia 76ers 122 (OT)

The Spectrum, Philadelphia, Pennsylvania

Julius Erving's famous “Rock The Baby” cradle dunk on Michael Cooper occurred during the Lakers versus 76ers matchup on January 5, 1983 at The Spectrum. The dunk put the 76ers up by 4 with about a minute and a half left in the game. The Sixers won the game, 122–120, in overtime, sweeping the regular season series versus the Lakers, which is what also occurred in the 1983 Finals.

== Series summary ==
Game	Date	Home team	Result	Road team
Game 1	May 22	Philadelphia 76ers	113–107 (1–0)	Los Angeles Lakers
Game 2	May 26	Philadelphia 76ers	103–93 (2–0)	Los Angeles Lakers
Game 3	May 29	Los Angeles Lakers	94–111 (0–3)	Philadelphia 76ers
Game 4	May 31	Los Angeles Lakers	108–115 (0–4)	Philadelphia 76ers

The final piece of the Philadelphia 76ers' championship puzzle was completed before the 1982–83 season when they acquired center Moses Malone from the Houston Rockets. They went on to capture their third NBA championship as they won 65 games, and stormed through the playoffs, first sweeping the New York Knicks, and then beating the Milwaukee Bucks in five games. They finally finished it off with a four-game sweep of the Los Angeles Lakers, who had defeated them the season before.

Said head coach Billy Cunningham, "The difference from last year was Moses." Malone was named MVP of the 1983 Finals, as well as league MVP for the third time in his career. The 76ers completed one of the most dominating playoff runs in league history with a 12–1 mark after league and NBA Finals MVP Moses promised "Fo', fo', fo" (as in "four, four, four"—four wins to win round 1, four wins to win round 2, etc.), but it actually wound up as "Fo', fi', fo." (four, five, four). The 76ers were also led by Julius Erving, Maurice Cheeks, Andrew Toney, and Bobby Jones.

With 59 seconds to go in Game 4, it was Erving who made a three-point play to hold the lead for good, crushing the Lakers in a four-game sweep and ending the last NBA Finals to end before June.

Until the Phillies won the 2008 World Series over the Tampa Bay Rays 4–1, this was the last time a team from Philadelphia in the Big Four leagues won their league's championship.

=== Game 1 ===
CBS

May 22
3:35 p.m. EDT

Los Angeles Lakers 107, Philadelphia 76ers 113
Scoring by quarter: 20–30, 37–24, 26–31, 24–28
Pts: Norm Nixon 26; Rebs: Mark Landsberger 10; Asts: Magic Johnson 11	Pts: Moses Malone 27; Rebs: Moses Malone 18; Asts: Julius Erving 9
Philadelphia leads the series, 1–0

The Spectrum, Philadelphia, Pennsylvania
Attendance: 18,482
Referees:
- No. 14 Jack Madden
- No. 4 Ed T. Rush

=== Game 2 ===
CBS

May 26
9:05 p.m. EDT

Los Angeles Lakers 93, Philadelphia 76ers 103
Scoring by quarter: 29–26, 26–25, 20–28, 18–24
Pts: Kareem Abdul-Jabbar 23; Rebs: Magic Johnson 8 Asts: Magic Johnson 13	Pts: Moses Malone 24; Rebs: Moses Malone 12; Asts: Maurice Cheeks 8
Philadelphia leads the series, 2–0

The Spectrum, Philadelphia, Pennsylvania
Attendance: 18,482
Referees:
- No. 10 Darell Garretson
- No. 9 John Vanak
- No. 12 Earl Strom (alternate)

=== Game 3 ===
CBS

May 29
12:35 p.m. PDT

Philadelphia 76ers 111, Los Angeles Lakers 94
Scoring by quarter: 21–32, 28–20, 23–20, 39–22
Pts: Moses Malone 28; Rebs: Moses Malone 19; Asts: Moses Malone 6	Pts: Kareem Abdul-Jabbar 23; Rebs: Kareem Abdul-Jabbar 15; Asts: Magic Johnson 13
Philadelphia leads the series, 3–0

The Forum, Inglewood, California
Attendance: 17,505
Referees:
- No. 20 Jess Kersey
- No. 11 Jake O'Donnell
- No. 25 Hugh Evans (alternate)

=== Game 4 ===
CBS

May 31
6:05 p.m. PDT

Philadelphia 76ers 115, Los Angeles Lakers 108
Scoring by quarter: 24–26, 27–39, 31–28, 33–15
Pts: Moses Malone 24; Rebs: Moses Malone 23; Asts: Andrew Toney 9	Pts: Kareem Abdul-Jabbar 28; Rebs: Abdul-Jabbar, Johnson, Landsberger, McGee 7 each Asts: Magic Johnson 15
Philadelphia wins the series, 4–0

The Forum, Inglewood, California
Attendance: 17,505
Referees:
- No. 25 Hugh Evans
- No. 12 Earl Strom
- No. 20 Jess Kersey (alternate)

This was the 76ers' last final playoff win until Game 1 in 2001, which also came against the Lakers at their home venue (the newly-opened Staples Center in Downtown Los Angeles instead of the Forum in Inglewood).

== Player statistics ==
Legend
GP	Games played	GS	Games started	MPG	Minutes per game
FG%	Field-goal percentage	3P%	3-point field-goal percentage	FT%	Free-throw percentage
RPG	Rebounds per game	APG	Assists per game	SPG	Steals per game
BPG	Blocks per game	PPG	Points per game

Philadelphia 76ers

Philadelphia 76ers statistics
Player	GP	GS	MPG	FG%	3P%	FT%	RPG	APG	SPG	BPG	PPG
Andrew Toney	4	4	36.8	.423	.000	.848	2.3	5.8	1.3	0.3	22.0
Moses Malone	4	4	39.3	.507	.000	.660	18.0	2.0	1.5	1.5	25.8
Maurice Cheeks	4	4	35.8	.553	.000	.600	2.3	6.3	2.8	0.0	15.3
Bobby Jones	4	0	26.0	.568	.000	.667	4.8	2.8	2.0	2.3	12.0
Marc Iavaroni	4	4	24.8	.588	.000	.375	5.5	2.0	0.3	0.8	5.8
Julius Erving	4	4	38.3	.469	.000	.800	8.5	5.0	1.3	2.8	19.0
Clint Richardson	4	0	23.0	.393	.000	.750	3.3	1.8	1.3	0.3	6.3
Clemon Johnson	3	0	12.7	.385	.000	.000	3.0	0.3	0.3	0.3	3.3
Earl Cureton	3	0	6.3	.333	.000	.000	1.0	0.3	0.7	0.0	0.7
Mark McNamara	1	0	1.0	1.000	.000	.000	0.0	0.0	0.0	0.0	4.0
Reggie Johnson	1	0	1.0	.000	.000	.000	0.0	0.0	0.0	0.0	0.0
Franklin Edwards	3	0	1.0	.000	.000	1.000	0.3	0.0	0.0	0.0	0.7

Los Angeles Lakers

Los Angeles Lakers statistics
Player	GP	GS	MPG	FG%	3P%	FT%	RPG	APG	SPG	BPG	PPG
Bob McAdoo	2	0	21.0	.409	.500	1.000	7.0	0.5	2.5	1.0	11.0
Kareem Abdul-Jabbar	4	4	38.8	.552	.000	.769	7.5	3.0	0.8	2.3	23.5
Jamaal Wilkes	4	4	39.3	.461	.000	.571	5.8	1.8	2.0	1.3	18.5
Norm Nixon	3	3	36.7	.405	.000	.636	2.7	4.7	1.3	0.3	13.7
Michael Cooper	4	1	31.5	.486	.333	.833	3.5	1.8	1.5	0.3	10.0
Kurt Rambis	4	4	21.3	.480	.000	.778	4.5	0.8	0.5	1.5	7.8
Mark Landsberger	4	0	14.0	.400	.000	1.000	5.0	0.5	0.0	0.5	2.5
Magic Johnson	4	4	44.8	.408	.000	.929	7.8	12.5	1.8	0.5	19.0
Clay Johnson	3	0	4.0	.600	.000	.000	0.7	0.3	0.3	0.3	2.0
Mike McGee	2	0	10.0	.333	.000	.000	3.5	0.5	0.0	0.0	3.0
Dwight Jones	2	0	8.5	.125	.000	.000	2.0	0.0	0.0	0.0	1.0
Steve Mix	1	0	1.0	.000	.000	.000	0.0	0.0	0.0	0.0	0.0

== Television coverage ==
The 1983 NBA Finals was broadcast by CBS. Dick Stockton and Bill Russell were the commentators and Brent Musburger was the host, with Kevin Loughery as a pre-game, halftime and post-game analyst. It also introduced a new theme music (composed by Allyson Bellink) for the CBS Sports coverage of the NBA, used an introduction of the NBA arenas (similar to the Boston Garden) until the 1989 playoffs and later revived the second theme beginning in the 1989 Finals.

Russell departed CBS following the series, and was replaced by former Celtics teammate Tom Heinsohn. Russell would later resurface as a color analyst on TBS until 1987.

== Team rosters ==
=== Philadelphia 76ers ===
1982–83 Philadelphia 76ers roster
Players

Pos.	No.	Player	Height	Weight	DOB	From
G	10	Maurice Cheeks	6 ft 1 in (1.85 m)	180 lb (82 kg)	1956–09–08	West Texas A&M
F	25	Earl Cureton	6 ft 9 in (2.06 m)	210 lb (95 kg)	1957–09–03	Detroit Mercy
G	14	Franklin Edwards	6 ft 1 in (1.85 m)	170 lb (77 kg)	1959–02–02	Cleveland State
F	6	Julius Erving	6 ft 7 in (2.01 m)	210 lb (95 kg)	1950–02–22	UMass
F	8	Marc Iavaroni	6 ft 8 in (2.03 m)	210 lb (95 kg)	1956–09–15	Virginia
C	45	Clemon Johnson	6 ft 10 in (2.08 m)	240 lb (109 kg)	1956–09–12	Florida A&M
F	33	Reggie Johnson	6 ft 9 in (2.06 m)	205 lb (93 kg)	1957–06–25	Tennessee
F	24	Bobby Jones	6 ft 9 in (2.06 m)	210 lb (95 kg)	1951–12–18	North Carolina
C	2	Moses Malone	6 ft 10 in (2.08 m)	260 lb (118 kg)	1955–03–23	Petersburg (HS)
C	31	Mark McNamara	6 ft 11 in (2.11 m)	235 lb (107 kg)	1959–06–08	California
G	4	Clint Richardson	6 ft 3 in (1.91 m)	195 lb (88 kg)	1956–08–07	Seattle
G	22	Andrew Toney	6 ft 3 in (1.91 m)	178 lb (81 kg)	1957–11–23	Louisiana

Coaches
Head coach
- (United States) Billy Cunningham (North Carolina)
Assistant(s)
- (United States) Matt Guokas (Saint Joseph's)
- (United States) Jack McMahon (St. John's)

Legend
- (DP) Unsigned draft pick
- (FA) Free agent
- (S) Suspended
- Injured

=== Los Angeles Lakers ===
1982–83 Los Angeles Lakers roster
Players

Pos.	No.	Player	Height	Weight	DOB	From
C	33	Kareem Abdul-Jabbar	7 ft 2 in (2.18 m)	225 lb (102 kg)	1947–04–16	UCLA
G	21	Michael Cooper	6 ft 5 in (1.96 m)	170 lb (77 kg)	1956–04–15	New Mexico
G	34	Clay Johnson	6 ft 4 in (1.93 m)	175 lb (79 kg)	1956–07–18	Missouri
G	32	Magic Johnson	6 ft 8 in (2.03 m)	215 lb (98 kg)	1959–08–14	Michigan State
F	13	Dwight Jones	6 ft 10 in (2.08 m)	210 lb (95 kg)	1952–02–27	Houston
G	15	Eddie Jordan	6 ft 1 in (1.85 m)	170 lb (77 kg)	1955–01–29	Rutgers
F	54	Mark Landsberger	6 ft 8 in (2.03 m)	225 lb (102 kg)	1955–05–21	Minnesota
C	11	Bob McAdoo	6 ft 9 in (2.06 m)	210 lb (95 kg)	1951–09–25	North Carolina
F	40	Mike McGee	6 ft 5 in (1.96 m)	190 lb (86 kg)	1959–07–29	Michigan
F	50	Steve Mix	6 ft 7 in (2.01 m)	215 lb (98 kg)	1947–12–30	Toledo
G	10	Norm Nixon	6 ft 2 in (1.88 m)	170 lb (77 kg)	1955–10–11	Duquesne
F	31	Kurt Rambis	6 ft 8 in (2.03 m)	213 lb (97 kg)	1958–02–25	Santa Clara
F	52	Jamaal Wilkes	6 ft 6 in (1.98 m)	190 lb (86 kg)	1953–05–02	UCLA
F	42	James Worthy	6 ft 9 in (2.06 m)	225 lb (102 kg)	1961–02–27	North Carolina

Coaches
Head coach
- (United States) Pat Riley (Kentucky)
Assistant(s)
- (United States) Bill Bertka (Kent State)
- (United States) Dave Wohl (Penn)

Legend
- (DP) Unsigned draft pick
- (FA) Free agent
- (S) Suspended
- Injured

== See also ==
- 1983 NBA playoffs
