= 1987–88 Seattle SuperSonics season =

NBA professional basketball team season

- Head coach: Bernie Bickerstaff
- General manager: Bob Whitsitt
- Owner: Barry Ackerley
- Arena: Seattle Center Coliseum

Results
- Record: 44–38 (.537)
- Place: Division: 3rd (Pacific); Conference: 7th (Western)
- Playoff finish: First round (lost to Nuggets 2–3)
- Stats at Basketball Reference

Local media
- Television: KIRO-TV; KTZZ-TV
- Radio: KJR

The 1987–88 Seattle SuperSonics season was the 21st season for the Seattle SuperSonics in the National Basketball Association.

== Season summary ==
=== Off-season ===
The SuperSonics received the fifth overall pick in the 1987 NBA draft, and selected small forward Scottie Pippen from the University of Central Arkansas; however, the team soon traded Pippen to the Chicago Bulls in exchange for rookie center, and first-round draft pick Olden Polynice from the University of Virginia. The SuperSonics also had the ninth overall pick, and selected small forward Derrick McKey from the University of Alabama. During the off-season, the team acquired Sam Vincent from the Boston Celtics.

=== Regular season ===
With the addition of McKey, the SuperSonics lost three of their first four games of the regular season, but later on posted a six-game winning streak in January, and held a 25–20 record at the All-Star break. At mid-season, the team traded Vincent to the Bulls in exchange for Sedale Threatt. Despite losing 9 of their 13 games in February, the SuperSonics finished in third place in the Pacific Division with a 44–38 record, and earned the seventh seed in the Western Conference; it was head coach Bernie Bickerstaff's first season with a record above .500 in winning percentage.

Dale Ellis led the SuperSonics in scoring averaging 25.8 points per game, and also led them with 107 three-point field goals, while Xavier McDaniel averaged 21.4 points and 6.6 rebounds per game, and Tom Chambers provided the team with 20.4 points and 6.0 rebounds per game. In addition, second-year guard Nate McMillan contributed 7.6 points, 8.6 assists and 2.1 steals per game, and Alton Lister provided with 5.6 points, 7.6 rebounds and 1.7 blocks per game. Off the bench, McKey averaged 8.5 points and 4.0 rebounds per game, and was named to the NBA All-Rookie Team, while Kevin Williams contributed 6.3 points per game, Russ Schoene provided with 6.0 points per game, Polynice averaged 4.1 points and 4.0 rebounds per game, and Danny Young contributed 3.2 points and 2.8 assists per game.

During the NBA All-Star weekend at the Chicago Stadium in Chicago, Illinois, McDaniel was selected for the 1988 NBA All-Star Game, as a member of the Western Conference All-Star team; it was his first and only All-Star appearance. Meanwhile, Ellis participated in the NBA Three-Point Shootout for the third consecutive year. McMillan finished tied in eighth place in Defensive Player of the Year voting. The SuperSonics finished 16th in the NBA in home-game attendance, with an attendance of 475,983 at the Seattle Center Coliseum during the regular season.

=== NBA playoffs ===
In the Western Conference First Round of the 1988 NBA playoffs, the SuperSonics faced off against the 2nd–seeded, and Midwest Division champion Denver Nuggets, who were led by the trio of All-Star forward Alex English, All-Star guard Fat Lever, and sixth man Jay Vincent. The Nuggets took a 2–1 series lead, but the SuperSonics managed to win Game 4 at home, 127–117 at the Seattle Center Coliseum to even the series. However, the SuperSonics lost Game 5 to the Nuggets on the road, 115–96 at the McNichols Sports Arena, thus losing in a hard-fought five-game series.

=== Aftermath ===
Following the season, Chambers signed as a free agent with the Phoenix Suns, while Williams was left unprotected in the 1988 NBA expansion draft, where he was selected by the Miami Heat expansion team, and Young signed with the Portland Trail Blazers.

== Offseason ==
=== Draft picks ===
Seattle selected future hall of famer Scottie Pippen in the first round thanks to a pick acquired from the New York Knicks, but traded him on draft day to the Chicago Bulls for Olden Polynice and two future conditional draft picks.

Round	Pick	Player	Position	Nationality	College
1	5	Scottie Pippen	SF	United States	Central Arkansas
1	9	Derrick McKey	SF	United States	Alabama
3	55	Tommy Amaker	G	United States	Duke
4	78	Todd Linder	F	United States	Tampa
5	101	Michael Tait	G	United States	Clemson
6	124	Tom Gneiting	C	United States	BYU
7	147	Mike Giomi	F	United States	NC State

== Roster ==
1987–88 Seattle SuperSonics roster
Players

Pos.	No.	Player	Height	Weight	DOB	From
F	24	Tom Chambers	6 ft 10 in (2.08 m)	220 lb (100 kg)	1959–06–21	Utah
G/F	3	Dale Ellis	6 ft 7 in (2.01 m)	205 lb (93 kg)	1960–08–06	Tennessee
F/C	45	Clemon Johnson	6 ft 10 in (2.08 m)	240 lb (109 kg)	1956–09–12	Florida A&M
C	53	Alton Lister	7 ft 0 in (2.13 m)	240 lb (109 kg)	1958–10–01	Arizona State
F	34	Xavier McDaniel	6 ft 7 in (2.01 m)	205 lb (93 kg)	1963–06–04	Wichita State
F	31	Derrick McKey	6 ft 9 in (2.06 m)	205 lb (93 kg)	1966–10–10	Alabama
G	10	Nate McMillan	6 ft 5 in (1.96 m)	195 lb (88 kg)	1964–08–03	NC State
C	23	Olden Polynice	6 ft 11 in (2.11 m)	220 lb (100 kg)	1964–11–21	Virginia
F/C	40	Russ Schoene	6 ft 10 in (2.08 m)	210 lb (95 kg)	1960–04–16	Chattanooga
G	4	Sedale Threatt	6 ft 2 in (1.88 m)	175 lb (79 kg)	1961–09–10	West Virginia Tech
G	30	Kevin Williams	6 ft 2 in (1.88 m)	175 lb (79 kg)	1961–09–11	St. John's
G	22	Danny Young	6 ft 3 in (1.91 m)	175 lb (79 kg)	1962–07–26	Wake Forest

Coaches
Head coach
- Bernie Bickerstaff

Legend
- (DP) Unsigned draft pick
- (FA) Free agent
- (S) Suspended
- Injured

=== 1987–88 Salaries ===
Player	1987–88 Salary
Tom Chambers	$950,000
Xavier McDaniel	$875,000
Alton Lister	$835,000
Clemon Johnson	$502,000
Derrick McKey	$355,000
Olden Polynice	$350,000
Dale Ellis	$325,000
Sedale Threatt	$270,000
Russ Schoene	$250,000
Danny Young	$130,000
Nate McMillan	$129,000
Kevin Williams	$125,000
TOTAL	$5,096,000

Sources:

- Basketball Reference: SEA Salaries

== Regular season ==
=== Season standings ===
Pacific Division	W	L	PCT	GB	Home	Road	Div
y-Los Angeles Lakers	62	20	.756	–	36–5	26–15	23–7
x-Portland Trail Blazers	53	29	.646	9	33–8	20–21	23–7
x-Seattle SuperSonics	44	38	.537	18	32–9	12–29	19–11
Phoenix Suns	28	54	.341	34	22–19	6–35	11–19
Golden State Warriors	20	62	.244	42	16–25	4–37	7–23
Los Angeles Clippers	17	65	.207	45	14–27	3–38	7–23

#	Western Conference				
#	Team	W	L	PCT	GB
1	z-Los Angeles Lakers	62	20	.756	–
2	y-Denver Nuggets	54	28	.659	8
3	x-Dallas Mavericks	53	29	.646	9
4	x-Portland Trail Blazers	53	29	.646	9
5	x-Utah Jazz	47	35	.573	15
6	x-Houston Rockets	46	36	.561	16
7	x-Seattle SuperSonics	44	38	.537	18
8	x-San Antonio Spurs	31	51	.378	31
9	Phoenix Suns	28	54	.341	34
10	Sacramento Kings	24	58	.293	38
11	Golden State Warriors	20	62	.244	42
12	Los Angeles Clippers	17	65	.207	45

=== Game log ===
1987–88 game log
Total: 44–38 (home: 32–9; road: 12–29)
November: 6–6 (home: 5–1; road: 1–5)

Game	Date	Team	Score	High points	High rebounds	High assists	Location Attendance	Record
1	November 6	@ L. A. Lakers	L 109–113	Tom Chambers (20)	Xavier McDaniel (9)	Nate McMillan (12)	The Forum; 17,505	0–1
2	November 7	Phoenix	W 112–96	Dale Ellis (27)			Seattle Center Coliseum; 14,252	1–1
3	November 10	Dallas	L 101–117	Dale Ellis (28)	Alton Lister (8)	Sam Vincent (6)	Seattle Center Coliseum; 10,447	1–2
4	November 12	@ San Antonio	L 118–123	Xavier McDaniel (23)			HemisFair Arena; 6,399	1–3
5	November 13	@ Dallas	W 103–95	Dale Ellis (22)	Alton Lister (8)	Nate McMillan (11)	Reunion Arena; 17,007	2–3
6	November 15	@ Houston	L 106–108	Dale Ellis (34)			The Summit; 16,611	2–4
7	November 18	Portland	W 120–114	Xavier McDaniel (32)			Seattle Center Coliseum; 8,461	3–4
8	November 20	Milwaukee	W 99–97	Xavier McDaniel (30)			Seattle Center Coliseum; 14,601	4–4
9	November 21	Washington	W 124–103	Xavier McDaniel (28)			Seattle Center Coliseum; 13,437	5–4
10	November 24	L. A. Lakers	W 103–85	Xavier McDaniel (34)	Alton Lister (13)	Nate McMillan (10)	Seattle Center Coliseum; 14,634	6–4
11	November 27	@ Boston	L 112–117	Dale Ellis (37)	Dale Ellis (9)	Nate McMillan (10)	Boston Garden; 14,890	6–5
12	November 28	@ Indiana	L 115–131	Dale Ellis (29)			Market Square Arena; 11,538	6–6

December : 9–7 (home: 5–0; road: 4–7)

Game	Date	Team	Score	High points	High rebounds	High assists	Location Attendance	Record
13	December 1	@ New York	W 112–109	Dale Ellis (37)			Madison Square Garden; 11,424	7–6
14	December 2	@ Cleveland	L 102–104	Dale Ellis (25)			Coliseum at Richfield; 6,207	7–7
15	December 4	@ Philadelphia	L 105–118	Tom Chambers (24)			The Spectrum; 13,115	7–8
16	December 5	@ Washington	W 115–99	Xavier McDaniel (26)			Capital Centre; 11,604	8–8
17	December 8	Cleveland	W 107–96	Dale Ellis; Xavier McDaniel (25)			Seattle Center Coliseum; 8,520	9–8
18	December 10	@ L. A. Clippers	L 96–113	Dale Ellis (20)			Los Angeles Memorial Sports Arena; 5,852	9–9
19	December 12	L. A. Clippers	W 116–95	Xavier McDaniel (35)			Seattle Center Coliseum; 10,623	10–9
20	December 14	@ Utah	L 95–116	Dale Ellis (29)			Salt Palace; 12,212	10–10
21	December 15	@ Portland	L 109–128	Xavier McDaniel (22)			Memorial Coliseum; 12,666	10–11
22	December 17	Sacramento	W 114–109	Tom Chambers (42)			Seattle Center Coliseum; 10,238	11–11
23	December 19	@ Golden State	W 129–102	Xavier McDaniel (32)			Oakland-Alameda County Coliseum Arena; 12,998	12–11
24	December 20	@ L. A. Lakers	L 94–103	Dale Ellis (24)	Xavier McDaniel (11)	Xavier McDaniel (7)	The Forum; 17,505	12–12
25	December 23	@ Phoenix	W 103–102	Dale Ellis (35)			Arizona Veterans Memorial Coliseum; 10,351	13–12
26	December 26	@ Denver	L 111–115	Xavier McDaniel (26)			McNichols Sports Arena; 12,403	13–13
27	December 28	Denver	W 108–100	Xavier McDaniel (30)			Seattle Center Coliseum; 13,007	14–13
28	December 30	Boston	W 111–105	Tom Chambers (31)	Alton Lister (12)	Sam Vincent (9)	Seattle Center Coliseum; 14,850	15–13

January : 9–6 (home: 8–1; road: 1–5)

Game	Date	Team	Score	High points	High rebounds	High assists	Location Attendance	Record
29	January 2	Philadelphia	W 116–114	Xavier McDaniel (35)			Seattle Center Coliseum; 14,250	16–13
30	January 5	@ Portland	L 114–126	Dale Ellis (32)			Memorial Coliseum; 12,666	16–14
31	January 6	Houston	W 110–95	Tom Chambers (46)			Seattle Center Coliseum; 11,289	17–14
32	January 9	San Antonio	W 141–133	Dale Ellis (47)			Seattle Center Coliseum; 11,565	18–14
33	January 10	@ Sacramento	L 108–109	Dale Ellis (30)			ARCO Arena (I); 10,333	18–15
34	January 13	Golden State	W 144–115	Xavier McDaniel (30)			Seattle Center Coliseum; 7,909	19–15
35	January 15	Utah	W 124–105	Dale Ellis (39)			Seattle Center Coliseum; 10,418	20–15
36	January 16	@ L. A. Clippers	W 114–112 (OT)	Dale Ellis (41)			Los Angeles Memorial Sports Arena; 8,697	21–15
37	January 18	Indiana	W 115–105	Dale Ellis (29)			Seattle Center Coliseum; 10,151	22–15
38	January 20	New York	W 108–96	Xavier McDaniel (41)			Seattle Center Coliseum; 11,767	23–15
39	January 22	Detroit	W 109–106	Dale Ellis (47)	Alton Lister (13)	Nate McMillan (14)	Seattle Center Coliseum; 14,737	24–15
40	January 24	L. A. Lakers	L 109–116	Xavier McDaniel (35)	Tom Chambers (10)	Nate McMillan (11)	Seattle Center Coliseum; 14,739	24–16
41	January 26	@ Sacramento	W 116–100	Dale Ellis (42)			ARCO Arena (I); 10,333	25–16
42	January 29	@ Dallas	L 109–117	Dale Ellis (35)	Alton Lister (9)	Nate McMillan (10)	Reunion Arena; 17,007	25–17
43	January 30	@ San Antonio	L 102–112 (OT)	Xavier McDaniel; Tom Chambers (27)			HemisFair Arena; 8,319	25–18

February : 4–9 (home: 3–2; road: 1–7)

Game	Date	Team	Score	High points	High rebounds	High assists	Location Attendance	Record
44	February 1	@ Utah	L 100–105	Dale Ellis (40)			Salt Palace; 12,212	25–19
45	February 4	Atlanta	L 109–119	Dale Ellis (36)			Seattle Center Coliseum; 14,611	25–20
46	February 9	@ Portland	L 123–139	Tom Chambers (21)			Memorial Coliseum; 12,666	25–21
47	February 11	Houston	W 120–115	Tom Chambers (36)			Seattle Center Coliseum; 13,038	26–21
48	February 13	@ Golden State	W 109–95	Dale Ellis (28)			Oakland-Alameda County Coliseum Arena; 13,502	26–22
49	February 15	Dallas	L 122–128 (OT)	Tom Chambers (29)	Xavier McDaniel (7)	Sam Vincent (12)	Seattle Center Coliseum; 13,492	26–23
50	February 17	@ Milwaukee	L 93–115	Dale Ellis (26)			MECCA Arena; 11,052	26–24
51	February 18	@ Detroit	L 95–108	Tom Chambers (24)	Olden Polynice (6)	Nate McMillan (9)	Pontiac Silverdome; 24,482	26–25
52	February 20	@ New Jersey	W 113–101	Dale Ellis (30)			Brendan Byrne Arena; 11,137	27–25
53	February 21	@ Atlanta	L 113–129	Dale Ellis (31)			The Omni; 15,437	27–26
54	February 23	@ Chicago	L 97–104 (OT)	Dale Ellis (34)			Chicago Stadium; 17,648	27–27
55	February 26	Sacramento	W 133–130	Dale Ellis (37)			Seattle Center Coliseum; 11,632	28–27
56	February 27	Golden State	W 114–111	Dale Ellis (30)			Seattle Center Coliseum; 10,752	29–27

March : 8–6 (home: 5–3; road: 3–3)

Game	Date	Team	Score	High points	High rebounds	High assists	Location Attendance	Record
57	March 1	L. A. Lakers	W 114–100	Dale Ellis (26)	Xavier McDaniel (12)	Nate McMillan (17)	Seattle Center Coliseum; 14,850	30–27
58	March 4	Utah	L 110–125	Tom Chambers (29)			Seattle Center Coliseum; 11,268	30–28
59	March 5	Denver	L 102–115	Dale Ellis (27)			Seattle Center Coliseum; 13,287	30–29
60	March 8	@ Golden State	W 121–116 (OT)	Dale Ellis (29)			Oakland-Alameda County Coliseum Arena; 11,178	31–29
61	March 9	@ Sacramento	W 106–97	Dale Ellis (24)			ARCO Arena (I); 10,333	32–29
62	March 13	New Jersey	W 115–102	Tom Chambers (25)			Seattle Center Coliseum; 9,040	33–29
63	March 15	@ Phoenix	L 90–111	Dale Ellis (38)			Arizona Veterans Memorial Coliseum; 11,159	33–30
64	March 17	@ Houston	L 106–115	Tom Chambers (24)			The Summit; 16,611	33–31
65	March 18	@ San Antonio	W 118–110 (OT)	Xavier McDaniel (31)			HemisFair Arena; 7,353	34–31
66	March 20	@ Denver	L 95–108	Dale Ellis (23)			McNichols Sports Arena; 13,117	34–32
67	March 23	Portland	W 118–108	Dale Ellis (35)			Seattle Center Coliseum; 14,250	35–32
68	March 26	L. A. Clippers	W 131–98	Dale Ellis (27)			Seattle Center Coliseum; 11,650	36–32
69	March 29	Chicago	W 106–103	Chambers (34)			Seattle Center Coliseum; 14,850	37–32
70	March 31	San Antonio	L 115–117	Dale Ellis; Tom Chambers (27)			Seattle Center Coliseum; 9,210	37–33

April : 7–5 (home: 6–2; road: 1–3)

Game	Date	Team	Score	High points	High rebounds	High assists	Location Attendance	Record
71	April 2	Phoenix	W 151–107	Xavier McDaniel (26)			Seattle Center Coliseum; 9,790	38–33
72	April 5	@ L. A. Lakers	L 90–94	Tom Chambers (21)	Alton Lister (14)	Xavier McDaniel, Nate McMillan (4)	The Forum; 17,505	38–34
73	April 6	Golden State	102–114	Derrick McKey (18)			Seattle Center Coliseum; 9,520	39–34
74	April 8	Portland	W 114–100	Xavier McDaniel (34)			Seattle Center Coliseum; 14,438	40–34
75	April 9	Houston	L 104–108	Xavier McDaniel (27)			Seattle Center Coliseum; 13,584	40–35
76	April 13	L. A. Clippers	W 113–92	Xavier McDaniel (23)			Seattle Center Coliseum; Not announced	41–35
77	April 15	Dallas	W 115–88	Alton Lister (19)	Alton Lister, Xavier McDaniel (7)	Nate McMillan (8)	Seattle Center Coliseum; 12,576	42–35
78	April 16	@ Phoenix	L 119–121 (OT)	Sedale Threatt (31)			Arizona Veterans Memorial Coliseum; 11,406	42–36
79	April 19	@ Denver	L 114–134	Tom Chambers (29)			McNichols Sports Arena; 14,478	42–37
80	April 20	Phoenix	W 121–98	Dale Ellis (24)			Seattle Center Coliseum; Not announced	43–37
81	April 22	Utah	L 109–110	Dale Ellis (20)			Seattle Center Coliseum; 14,250	43–38
82	April 24	@ L.A. Clippers	W 109–100	Russ Schoene; Tom Chambers (20)			Los Angeles Memorial Sports Arena; Not announced	44–38

1987–88 season schedule

== Playoffs ==
1988 playoff game log
First round: 2–3 (home: 1–1; road: 1–2)

Game	Date	Team	Score	High points	High rebounds	High assists	Location Attendance	Series
1	April 29	@ Denver	L 123–126	Tom Chambers (29)	Xavier McDaniel (10)	Xavier McDaniel, Nate McMillan (8)	McNichols Sports Arena; 17,022	0–1
2	May 1	@ Denver	W 111–91	Dale Ellis (24)	Xavier McDaniel (17)	Nate McMillan (6)	McNichols Sports Arena; 17,022	1–1
3	May 3	Denver	L 114–125	Tom Chambers (34)	Xavier McDaniel (12)	Nate McMillan (9)	Seattle Center Coliseum; 14,250	1–2
4	May 5	Denver	W 127–117	Xavier McDaniel (27)	Derrick McKey (7)	Danny Young (8)	Seattle Center Coliseum; 14,250	2–2
5	May 7	@ Denver	L 96–115	Tom Chambers (23)	Alton Lister (8)	Xavier McDaniel (5)	McNichols Sports Arena; 16,040	2–3

1988 schedule

== Statistics ==
Legend
GP	Games played	GS	Games started	MPG	Minutes per game
FG%	Field-goal percentage	3P%	3-point field-goal percentage	FT%	Free-throw percentage
RPG	Rebounds per game	APG	Assists per game	SPG	Steals per game
BPG	Blocks per game	PPG	Points per game

=== Season ===
Player	GP	GS	MPG	FG%	3FG%	FT%	RPG	APG	SPG	BPG	PPG
Tom Chambers	82	82	32.7	.448	.303	.807	6.0	2.6	1.1	.6	20.4
Dale Ellis	75	73	37.2	.503	.413	.767	4.5	2.6	1.0	.1	25.8
Clemon Johnson	74	26	9.8	.467	.000	.688	2.4	.2	.2	.3	1.6
Alton Lister	82	55	22.1	.504	.500	.606	7.6	.7	.3	1.7	5.6
Xavier McDaniel	78	77	34.7	.488	.280	.715	6.6	3.4	1.2	.7	21.4
Derrick McKey	82	4	20.8	.491	.367	.772	4.0	1.3	.9	.8	8.5
Nate McMillan	82	82	29.9	.474	.375	.707	4.1	8.6	2.1	.6	7.6
Olden Polynice	82	0	13.2	.465	.000	.639	4.0	.4	.4	.3	4.1
Russ Schoene	81	2	12.0	.458	.293	.810	2.4	.7	.5	.2	6.0
Sedale Threatt^{1}	26	0	13.6	.519	.143	.833	1.3	2.0	1.3	.2	7.5
Sam Vincent^{1}	43	0	12.7	.474	.385	.767	1.1	3.2	.5	.1	4.5
Kevin Williams	80	9	13.6	.442	.143	.844	1.6	1.2	.8	.1	6.3
Danny Young	77	0	12.3	.408	.286	.811	1.0	2.8	.7	.0	3.2

1. Statistics with the SuperSonics.

=== Playoffs ===
Player	GP	GS	MPG	FG%	3FG%	FT%	RPG	APG	SPG	BPG	PPG
Tom Chambers	5		25.8	.549	.000	.829	6.2	2.2	.6	.2	25.8
Dale Ellis	5		34.4	.482	.250	.724	4.6	3.0	.6	.4	20.8
Clemon Johnson	5		7.8	.429	.000	.500	1.4	.0	.2	.2	1.4
Alton Lister	5		15.4	.706	.000	.800	5.8	1.0	.2	1.0	5.6
Xavier McDaniel	5		36.0	.556	.500	.500	9.6	5.0	.6	.2	21.2
Derrick McKey	5		21.8	.632	.333	.588	4.0	1.6	.6	1.0	12.0
Nate McMillan	5		25.4	.343	.000	.643	4.2	6.6	.4	.6	6.6
Olden Polynice	5		13.2	.455	.000	.000	1.6	.0	.6	.0	2.0
Russ Schoene	5		7.8	.583	.500	.000	1.4	.4	.2	.0	3.2
Sedale Threatt	5		16.0	.412	.000	1.000	2.2	2.2	.2	.0	6.4
Kevin Williams	5		14.0	.438	.000	.000	1.6	1.8	.6	.0	2.8
Danny Young	5		19.0	.524	.000	1.000	2.0	3.8	.4	.4	6.4

== Awards and records ==
=== Awards ===
- Derrick McKey earned an NBA All-Rookie First Team selection.
- Xavier McDaniel was selected to participate in the 1988 NBA All-Star Game.

== Transactions ==
=== Overview ===
Players Added

Via draft

- Derrick McKey
- Olden Polynice

Via free agency

- Ricky Wilson

Via trade

- Sam Vincent
- Sedale Threatt
Players Lost

Via free agency

- Maurice Lucas

Via trade

- Sam Vincent

Via waiver

- Ricky Wilson
- Mike Phelps
- Tod Murphy

=== Trades ===
October 16, 1987	To Seattle SuperSonics Sam Vincent Scott Wedman	To Boston Celtics Conditional 1988 second round pick
February 25, 1988	To Seattle SuperSonics Sedale Threatt	To Chicago Bulls Sam Vincent

=== Free agents ===
==== Additions ====
Player	Signed	Former team
Ricky Wilson	October 7, 1987	Mississippi Jets

==== Subtractions ====
Player	Left	New team
Maurice Lucas^{2}	November 10, 1987	Portland Trail Blazers
Eddie Johnson	December 6, 1987	—N/a (Suspended/Retired)^{3}

2. Received a conditional 1990 second round pick as compensation.
3. Suspended on December 6, 1987 due to failed mandatory drug counseling; later retired altogether.

== See also ==
- 1987–88 NBA season
