= Clint Richardson =

American basketball player (born 1956)

Personal information
- Born: August 7, 1956 (age 70) Seattle, Washington, U.S.
- Listed height: 6 ft 3 in (1.91 m)
- Listed weight: 195 lb (88 kg)

Career information
- High school: O'Dea (Seattle, Washington)
- College: Seattle (1975–1979)
- NBA draft: 1979: 2nd round, 36th overall pick
- Drafted by: Philadelphia 76ers
- Playing career: 1979–1987
- Position: Shooting guard
- Number: 4

Career history
- 1979–1985: Philadelphia 76ers
- 1985–1987: Indiana Pacers

Career highlights
- NBA champion (1983); No. 44 retired by Seattle Redhawks

Career statistics
- Points: 4,084 (7.0 ppg)
- Rebounds: 1,378 (2.4 rpg)
- Assists: 1,461 (2.5 apg)
- Stats at NBA.com
- Stats at Basketball Reference

Clint Richardson Jr. (born August 7, 1956, in Seattle) is an American former professional basketball player who was selected by the Philadelphia 76ers in the second round (36th pick overall) of the 1979 NBA draft. A 6'3" guard from Seattle University, Richardson played in nine NBA seasons, from 1980 to 1989, with the 76ers and the Indiana Pacers. He also played for one season (European Cup matches only) for one of the top Greek teams, AEK Athens, as well as a season in Italy. During his NBA career, Richardson played in 586 games and scored a total of 4,084 points. His best year as a professional came during the 1985-86 season as a member of the Pacers, appearing in 82 games and averaging 9.7 ppg. Richardson was a member of the 1982-83 76ers NBA championship team.

Early in his NBA career, Richardson cited Magic Johnson, Sidney Moncrief, Elston Turner, Michael Cooper and Don Collins as the best backcourt rebounders, most of whom were former college forwards.

== Career statistics ==
Legend
GP	Games played	GS	Games started	MPG	Minutes per game
FG%	Field goal percentage	3P%	3-point field goal percentage	FT%	Free throw percentage
RPG	Rebounds per game	APG	Assists per game	SPG	Steals per game
BPG	Blocks per game	PPG	Points per game	**Bold**	Career high
†	Won an NBA championship

=== NBA ===
==== Regular season ====
Year	Team	GP	GS	MPG	FG%	3P%	FT%	RPG	APG	SPG	BPG	PPG
1979–80	Philadelphia	52	34	19.0	.457	.333	.622	2.4	2.1	.5	**.3**	6.7
1980–81	Philadelphia	77	1	17.1	**.489**	.000	.778	2.3	2.0	.5	.1	7.0
1981–82	Philadelphia	77	0	13.5	.452	**1.000**	.784	1.5	1.4	.5	.1	4.6
1982–83†	Philadelphia	77	1	22.8	.463	.000	.640	**3.2**	2.2	**.9**	.2	7.6
1983–84	Philadelphia	69	12	22.8	.467	.000	.767	2.4	2.2	.7	**.3**	7.6
1984–85	Philadelphia	74	20	20.7	.453	.333	**.854**	2.1	2.1	.5	.2	6.0
1985–86	Indiana	**82**	**61**	**27.1**	.455	.111	.837	3.1	**4.5**	.7	.1	**9.7**
1986–87	Indiana	78	14	17.9	.467	.353	.797	1.8	3.1	.6	.1	6.4
Career		586	143	20.2	.463	.244	.770	2.4	2.5	.6	.2	7.0

==== Playoffs ====
Year	Team	GP	GS	MPG	FG%	3P%	FT%	RPG	APG	SPG	BPG	PPG
1980	Philadelphia	3		1.0	.333	.000	–	.0	.0	.3	.0	.7
1981	Philadelphia	13		13.9	.526	–	.529	1.6	.9	.5	**.2**	3.8
1982	Philadelphia	**21**		19.8	.452	–	.567	**3.3**	1.9	.6	**.2**	5.3
1983†	Philadelphia	13		**24.5**	.446	–	.824	3.0	1.8	**1.2**	**.2**	6.8
1984	Philadelphia	5		23.0	.565	–	**.917**	3.2	2.0	.6	**.2**	7.4
1985	Philadelphia	13	0	21.6	.564	–	.900	2.9	**2.1**	.8	**.2**	**8.8**
1987	Indiana	4	0	18.3	**.583**	.000	.500	2.5	2.0	.0	.0	4.0
Career		72	0	19.3	.499	.000	.689	2.7	1.7	.7	.2	5.8
