= Nate McMillan =

American basketball coach and former player (born 1964)

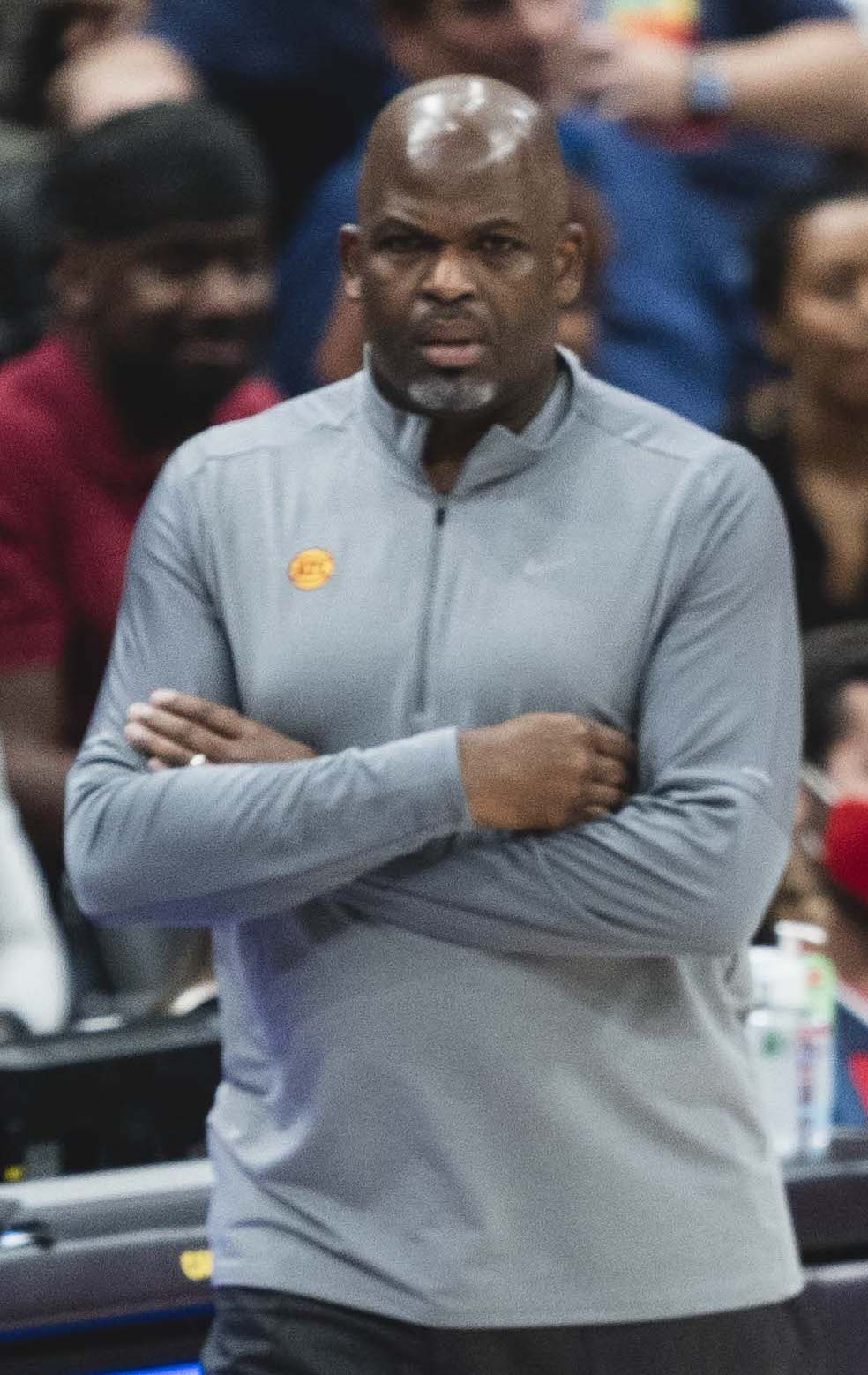
- McMillan with the Atlanta Hawks in 2021

Los Angeles Lakers
- Title: Assistant coach
- League: NBA

Personal information
- Born: August 3, 1964 (age 62) Raleigh, North Carolina, U.S.
- Listed height: 6 ft 5 in (1.96 m)
- Listed weight: 210 lb (95 kg)

Career information
- High school: William G. Enloe (Raleigh, North Carolina)
- College: Chowan (1982–1984); NC State (1984–1986)
- NBA draft: 1986: 2nd round, 30th overall pick
- Drafted by: Seattle SuperSonics
- Playing career: 1986–1998
- Position: Point guard / shooting guard
- Number: 10
- Coaching career: 1998–present

Career history

Playing
- 1986–1998: Seattle SuperSonics

Career highlights
- 2× NBA All-Defensive Second Team (1994, 1995); NBA steals leader (1994); No. 10 retired by Seattle SuperSonics; No. 10 jersey honored by NC State Wolfpack

Career NBA statistics
- Points: 4,733 (5.9 ppg)
- Assists: 4,893 (6.1 apg)
- Steals: 1,544 (1.9 spg)
- Stats at NBA.com
- Stats at Basketball Reference
Medals
Men's basketball
Representing United States
Olympic Games
Assistant coach for United States
| Gold medal – first place | 2008 Beijing | Men's basketball |
| Gold medal – first place | 2012 London | Men's basketball |
FIBA World Championship
Assistant coach for United States
| Bronze medal – third place | 2006 Japan | Men's basketball |
FIBA Americas Championship
Assistant coach for United States
| Gold medal – first place | 2007 Las Vegas | Men's basketball |

Nathaniel McMillan (born August 3, 1964) is an American basketball coach and former player who serves as an assistant coach for the Los Angeles Lakers of the National Basketball Association (NBA). He coached the Seattle SuperSonics from 2000 to 2005, the Portland Trail Blazers from 2005 to 2012, and the Indiana Pacers from 2016 to 2020. McMillan served as an assistant coach for the Atlanta Hawks in 2021, before becoming the head coach from 2021 to 2023. He spent his entire 12-year NBA playing career with the SuperSonics, then served as an assistant coach for one-and-a-half years and as head coach for almost five years. His long tenure as a player and coach in Seattle earned him the nickname "Mr. Sonic".

== High school and college career ==
McMillan grew up in the heart of North Carolina's basketball country and attended Raleigh's William G. Enloe High School, where he went unnoticed by major college scouts. After playing for two years at Chowan College (then a two-year school) in Murfreesboro, North Carolina, he returned to Raleigh to play for Jim Valvano at North Carolina State. McMillan helped lead NC State to a first-place tie in the Atlantic Coast Conference regular season in 1985, and to the Elite Eight in both the 1985 and 1986 NCAA championship tournaments, where the Wolfpack lost to St. John's and Kansas, respectively. During his time at NC State, McMillan played alongside a number of fellow future NBA players: Spud Webb, Lorenzo Charles, Cozell McQueen, Chris Washburn, Vinny Del Negro, Charles Shackleford and Chucky Brown.

== Professional career ==
McMillan was drafted by the Seattle SuperSonics with the 30th pick in the 1986 NBA draft. He spent his entire NBA career in Seattle. During his 12-year playing career, McMillan put up career averages of 5.9 points, 6.1 assists and 1.9 steals. He still shares (with Ernie DiGregorio) the NBA rookie record for assists in a single game with 25. McMillan served as the primary starting point guard for the SuperSonics from the time he replaced Danny Young midway through the 1986–87 season, until he was replaced at the start of the 1990–91 season by future NBA Hall-of-Famer Gary Payton, then a rookie and the number two pick in the 1990 draft. McMillan was known for his superb defense, leading the NBA in steals per game for the 1993–94 season and being named to the NBA All-Defensive Second Team for the 1993–94 and 1994–95 seasons. McMillan was also known for his balanced play, which led to four career triple-doubles.

In the 1995–96 season, McMillan helped the SuperSonics reach the NBA Finals against the Michael Jordan-led Chicago Bulls. The SuperSonics were the only team to beat the Bulls three times that season (once in the regular season and twice in the playoffs).

Known as "Mr. Sonic" for his 19 years of service to the team, his number 10 jersey was retired by the SuperSonics.

== Coaching career ==
=== Seattle SuperSonics (1998–2005) ===
After retiring in 1998, McMillan stayed in Seattle as an assistant under Paul Westphal. He held this role until 2000 when the Sonics fired Westphal and made McMillan interim coach. Although the team missed the playoffs during his first year, he earned a winning record of 38–29 as interim head coach. He was hired as head coach for the 2001–02 campaign and led the club to the playoffs.

McMillan's Sonics had mediocre records the next two years, going 40–42 and 37–45. In the 2004–05 season, he led the team to 52–30 record in the regular season. The team advanced to the Western Conference semifinals, where they lost to the San Antonio Spurs.

=== Portland Trail Blazers (2005–2012) ===
After spending 19 years in Seattle as a player and coach, McMillan left Seattle on July 6, 2005, to become the head coach of the Portland Trail Blazers. He took over a team riddled with cap problems and off-the-court drama, but steadily calmed the waters in Portland. His hard-nosed coaching style earned him the nickname "Sarge." On December 5, 2009, McMillan ruptured his right Achilles tendon while scrimmaging with the Trail Blazers during practice. He coached much of the season in a protective boot after surgery and led the team to 50 wins in spite of a historic number of injuries to his key players. McMillan coached the Blazers until March 15, 2012.

=== Indiana Pacers (2013–2020) ===
On July 1, 2013, McMillan was hired by the Indiana Pacers as an assistant coach for the 2013–14 season. He replaced Brian Shaw, who accepted the head coaching position with the Denver Nuggets. In May 2016, after former head coach Frank Vogel's contract was not extended, McMillan was promoted to replace Vogel as the Pacers' coach. In McMillan's first year as head coach, the team experienced turmoil surrounding the displeasure and eventual departure of All-Star Paul George, who was traded to the Oklahoma City Thunder in June 2017. Despite this drama, the Pacers made the playoffs in all four of McMillan's seasons with the team, including three straight years without George. This was due largely to the emergence of the two players for whom he was traded, Victor Oladipo, who won the league's award for Most Improved Player in 2017 and was named to his first All-Star team in 2018, and Domantas Sabonis, who would also become an All-Star two years later in 2019. On August 12, 2020, Indiana announced that they had extended McMillan's contract. However, he was then fired a mere two weeks later, on August 26, 2020, after the Pacers were swept in the first round of the playoffs for the second year in a row, the fourth first round exit and third first round sweep in four playoff appearances under McMillan.

=== Atlanta Hawks (2020–2023) ===
On November 11, 2020, the Atlanta Hawks hired McMillan as an assistant coach under Lloyd Pierce. On March 1, 2021, McMillan was named interim head coach after the firing of Pierce. Following McMillan's promotion, Atlanta promptly went on an eight-game winning streak, begun with a victory over the defending Eastern Conference champion Miami Heat on March 2, 2021, and capped off by a win over the defending NBA champion Los Angeles Lakers on March 20, 2021. The Hawks finished the season 27–11 under McMillan's leadership, ending a four-year playoff drought and earning the fifth seed in the Eastern Conference. Atlanta's success continued on into the playoffs. They beat the fourth-seeded New York Knicks in five games, and continued their improbable run by upsetting the top-seeded Philadelphia 76ers in a hard-fought seven-game series. With that series win, the Hawks made it to the Eastern Conference finals, only the second time in 54 years they have advanced past the second round. There they faced the third-seeded Milwaukee Bucks, led by two-time league MVP Giannis Antetokounmpo. McMillan led the Hawks to their first-ever win in the conference finals, defeating the Bucks 116–113 in game 1. The Hawks would lose the series in six games.

On July 5, 2021, McMillan and the Hawks agreed in principle to drop the "interim" tag from his title and make him the franchise's 14th head coach since the team moved to Atlanta, with a four-year contract. General manager Travis Schlenk said that while the language of the contract was still being drawn up, "I'm excited he's going to be our head coach going forward." The deal was formally announced on July 7, with Schlenk praising the "incredible job" McMillan had done after taking over the team in mid-season.

On February 21, 2023, the Hawks fired McMillan after the team posted a 29–30 record going into the All-Star break.

=== Los Angeles Lakers (2024–present) ===
On August 5, 2024, McMillan joined the Los Angeles Lakers coaching staff as an assistant coach under head coach JJ Redick.

== National team career ==
McMillan was an assistant coach under Mike Krzyzewski for the U.S. national team in the 2006 FIBA World Championship and in the 2008 Beijing Olympics, winning bronze and gold medals, respectively. He is also a member of the National Junior College Basketball Hall of Fame, due to his All-American performance at Chowan.

McMillan again served as an assistant coach under Krzyzewski for the U.S. national team during the 2012 Summer Olympics, winning another gold medal.

== Career statistics ==
Legend
| GP | Games played | GS | Games started | MPG | Minutes per game |
| FG% | Field goal percentage | 3P% | 3-point field goal percentage | FT% | Free throw percentage |
| RPG | Rebounds per game | APG | Assists per game | SPG | Steals per game |
| BPG | Blocks per game | PPG | Points per game | **Bold** | Career high |
| * | Led the league |

=== NBA ===
==== Regular season ====
| Year | Team | GP | GS | MPG | FG% | 3P% | FT% | RPG | APG | SPG | BPG | PPG |
|---|---|---|---|---|---|---|---|---|---|---|---|---|
| 1986–87 | Seattle | 71 | 50 | 27.8 | **.475** | .000 | .617 | 4.7 | 8.2 | 1.8 | .6 | 5.3 |
| 1987–88 | Seattle | **82** | **82*** | 29.9 | .474 | .375 | .707 | 4.1 | 8.6 | 2.1 | .6 | **7.6** |
| 1988–89 | Seattle | 75 | 74 | **31.2** | .410 | .214 | .630 | **5.2** | **9.3** | 2.1 | .6 | 7.3 |
| 1989–90 | Seattle | **82*** | 69 | 28.5 | .473 | .355 | .641 | 4.9 | 7.3 | 1.7 | .5 | 6.4 |
| 1990–91 | Seattle | 78 | 0 | 18.4 | .433 | .354 | .613 | 3.2 | 4.8 | 1.3 | .3 | 4.3 |
| 1991–92 | Seattle | 72 | 30 | 22.9 | .437 | .276 | .643 | 3.5 | 5.0 | 1.8 | .4 | 6.0 |
| 1992–93 | Seattle | 73 | 25 | 27.1 | .464 | .385 | .709 | 4.2 | 5.3 | 2.4 | .5 | 7.5 |
| 1993–94 | Seattle | 73 | 8 | 25.8 | .447 | .391 | .564 | 3.9 | 5.3 | **3.0*** | .3 | 6.0 |
| 1994–95 | Seattle | 80 | 18 | 25.9 | .418 | .342 | .586 | 3.8 | 5.3 | 2.1 | **.7** | 5.2 |
| 1995–96 | Seattle | 55 | 14 | 22.9 | .420 | .340 | .707 | 3.8 | 3.6 | 1.7 | .3 | 5.0 |
| 1996–97 | Seattle | 37 | 2 | 21.6 | .409 | .333 | .655 | 3.2 | 3.8 | 1.6 | .2 | 4.6 |
| 1997–98 | Seattle | 18 | 1 | 15.5 | .343 | **.441** | **1.000** | 2.2 | 3.1 | .8 | .2 | 3.4 |
| Career | | 796 | 373 | 25.7 | .443 | .343 | .650 | 4.0 | 6.1 | 1.9 | .5 | 5.9 |

==== Playoffs ====
| Year | Team | GP | GS | MPG | FG% | 3P% | FT% | RPG | APG | SPG | BPG | PPG |
|---|---|---|---|---|---|---|---|---|---|---|---|---|
| 1987 | Seattle | 14 | **14** | 25.4 | .435 | – | .708 | 3.9 | **8.0** | 1.0 | **.7** | 5.1 |
| 1988 | Seattle | 5 | 5 | 25.4 | .343 | .000 | .643 | 4.2 | 6.6 | .4 | .6 | 6.6 |
| 1989 | Seattle | 8 | 7 | 25.5 | **.475** | .000 | .640 | 3.1 | 7.9 | 1.3 | .6 | 6.8 |
| 1991 | Seattle | 5 | 0 | 19.0 | .261 | .000 | .500 | 3.6 | 4.4 | 1.2 | .2 | 2.8 |
| 1992 | Seattle | 9 | 2 | 27.3 | .422 | .231 | .714 | 3.7 | 7.0 | 1.8 | .3 | **9.6** |
| 1993 | Seattle | **19** | 2 | 21.8 | .340 | .208 | .533 | 3.5 | 5.4 | 2.1 | .6 | 4.8 |
| 1994 | Seattle | 5 | 0 | 21.8 | .320 | .364 | .250 | 3.2 | 2.0 | 1.2 | .2 | 4.2 |
| 1995 | Seattle | 4 | 4 | **28.3** | .348 | .125 | **1.000** | **4.5** | 7.3 | **2.5** | .5 | 4.8 |
| 1996 | Seattle | **19** | 0 | 20.3 | .406 | **.475** | .643 | 3.7 | 2.7 | 1.2 | .3 | 4.4 |
| 1997 | Seattle | 3 | 0 | 13.7 | .000 | .000 | – | 1.7 | 1.0 | .3 | .0 | .0 |
| 1998 | Seattle | 7 | 0 | 14.1 | .333 | .167 | **1.000** | 2.3 | 2.1 | .4 | .3 | 2.3 |
| Career | | 98 | 34 | 22.3 | .381 | .289 | .632 | 3.5 | 5.2 | 1.3 | .4 | 5.0 |

== Head coaching record ==
Legend
| Regular season | G | Games coached | W | Games won | L | Games lost | W–L % | Win–loss % |
| Playoffs | PG | Playoff games | PW | Playoff wins | PL | Playoff losses | PW–L % | Playoff win–loss % |

| Team | Year | G | W | L | W–L% | Finish | PG | PW | PL | PW–L% | Result |
|---|---|---|---|---|---|---|---|---|---|---|---|
| Seattle | 2000–01 | 67 | 38 | 29 | .567 | 5th in Pacific | — | — | — | — | Missed playoffs |
| Seattle | 2001–02 | 82 | 45 | 37 | .549 | 4th in Pacific | 5 | 2 | 3 | .400 | Lost in First round |
| Seattle | 2002–03 | 82 | 40 | 42 | .488 | 5th in Pacific | — | — | — | — | Missed playoffs |
| Seattle | 2003–04 | 82 | 37 | 45 | .451 | 5th in Pacific | — | — | — | — | Missed playoffs |
| Seattle | 2004–05 | 82 | 52 | 30 | .634 | 1st in Northwest | 11 | 6 | 5 | .545 | Lost in Conference semifinals |
| Portland | 2005–06 | 82 | 21 | 61 | .256 | 5th in Northwest | — | — | — | — | Missed playoffs |
| Portland | 2006–07 | 82 | 32 | 50 | .390 | 3rd in Northwest | — | — | — | — | Missed playoffs |
| Portland | 2007–08 | 82 | 41 | 41 | .500 | 3rd in Northwest | — | — | — | — | Missed playoffs |
| Portland | 2008–09 | 82 | 54 | 28 | .659 | 1st in Northwest | 6 | 2 | 4 | .333 | Lost in First round |
| Portland | 2009–10 | 82 | 50 | 32 | .610 | 3rd in Northwest | 6 | 2 | 4 | .333 | Lost in First round |
| Portland | 2010–11 | 82 | 48 | 34 | .585 | 3rd in Northwest | 6 | 2 | 4 | .333 | Lost in First round |
| Portland | 2011–12 | 43 | 20 | 23 | .465 | (fired) | — | — | — | — | — |
| Indiana | 2016–17 | 82 | 42 | 40 | .512 | 4th in Central | 4 | 0 | 4 | .000 | Lost in First round |
| Indiana | 2017–18 | 82 | 48 | 34 | .585 | 2nd in Central | 7 | 3 | 4 | .429 | Lost in First round |
| Indiana | 2018–19 | 82 | 48 | 34 | .585 | 2nd in Central | 4 | 0 | 4 | .000 | Lost in First round |
| Indiana | 2019–20 | 73 | 45 | 28 | .616 | 2nd in Central | 4 | 0 | 4 | .000 | Lost in First round |
| Atlanta | 2020–21 | 38 | 27 | 11 | .711 | 1st in Southeast | 18 | 10 | 8 | .556 | Lost in Conference finals |
| Atlanta | 2021–22 | 82 | 43 | 39 | .524 | 2nd in Southeast | 5 | 1 | 4 | .200 | Lost in First round |
| Atlanta | 2022–23 | 59 | 29 | 30 | .492 | (fired) | — | — | — | — | — |
| Career | | 1,428 | 760 | 668 | .534 | | 76 | 28 | 48 | .368 | |

== Personal life ==
McMillan and his wife have two children. His son, Jamelle, played as a guard for the Arizona State Sun Devils and was an assistant coach with the New Orleans Pelicans from 2013 to 2020, and later an assistant coach with the Atlanta Hawks.

== See also ==
- List of NBA career steals leaders
- List of NBA single-game assists leaders
- List of NBA single-season steals per game leaders
- List of NBA players who have spent their entire career with one franchise
