= Kevin Williams (basketball) =

American basketball player (born 1961)

Personal information
- Born: September 11, 1961 (age 64) New York City, New York, U.S.
- Listed height: 6 ft 2 in (1.88 m)
- Listed weight: 175 lb (79 kg)

Career information
- High school: Charles E. Hughes (New York City, New York)
- College: St. John's (1979–1983)
- NBA draft: 1983: 2nd round, 46th overall pick
- Drafted by: San Antonio Spurs
- Playing career: 1983–1995
- Position: Point guard
- Number: 12, 30, 7, 42

Career history
- 1983: San Antonio Spurs
- 1983–1984: Ohio Mixers
- 1984–1985: Cleveland Cavaliers
- 1985–1986: Tampa Bay Thrillers
- 1986: Cincinnati Slammers
- 1986: Staten Island Stallions
- 1986–1988: Seattle SuperSonics
- 1988–1989: New Jersey Nets
- 1989: Los Angeles Clippers
- 1989: Grand Rapids Hoops
- 1989: Hapoel Holon
- 1989–1990: Columbus Horizon
- 1990–1991: Tulsa Fast Breakers
- 1992–1993: La Crosse Catbirds
- 1993: Iraklis Thessaloniki B.C.
- 1993: Capital Region Pontiacs
- 1994–1995: Rapid City Thrillers
- 1995: Chicago Rockers

Career highlights
- CBA champion (1986); All-CBA Second Team (1986)
- Stats at NBA.com
- Stats at Basketball Reference

Kevin Eugene Williams (born September 11, 1961) is an American former professional basketball player. A 6-foot-2-inch (1.88 m) and 175-pound (79 kg) point guard, Williams played college basketball for the St. John's Red Storm from 1979 to 1983. He attended Charles Evans Hughes High School.

Williams was selected with the 22nd pick in the 2nd round (46th overall) by the San Antonio Spurs in the 1983 NBA draft. He played five NBA seasons for 5 different teams; his final NBA season split with the Los Angeles Clippers and New Jersey Nets in 1988–89.

Williams played in the Continental Basketball Association (CBA) for the Ohio Mixers, Bay State Bombardiers, Tampa Bay / Rapid City Thrillers, Cincinnati Slammers, Staten Island Stallions, Grand Rapids Hoops, Columbus Horizon, Tulsa Fast Breakers, La Crosse Catbirds, Capital Region Pontiacs and Chicago Rockers from 1983 to 1995. He won a CBA championship with the Thrillers in 1986. He was selected to the All-CBA Second Team in 1986.

== Career statistics ==
Legend
GP	Games played	GS	Games started	MPG	Minutes per game
FG%	Field goal percentage	3P%	3-point field goal percentage	FT%	Free throw percentage
RPG	Rebounds per game	APG	Assists per game	SPG	Steals per game
BPG	Blocks per game	PPG	Points per game	**Bold**	Career high

=== NBA ===
==== Regular season ====
Year	Team	GP	GS	MPG	FG%	3P%	FT%	RPG	APG	SPG	BPG	PPG
1983–84	San Antonio	19	0	10.5	.431	.000	.781	.7	**2.3**	.4	.2	3.9
1984–85	Cleveland	46	4	9.0	.433	.000	.734	1.4	1.3	.5	.1	3.5
1986–87	Seattle	65	0	10.8	**.446**	.000	.833	1.3	1.0	.7	.1	4.9
1987–88	Seattle	**80**	**9**	**13.6**	.442	.143	**.844**	1.6	1.2	**.8**	.1	**6.3**
1988–89	New Jersey	41	0	10.6	.399	**.167**	.784	1.2	.9	.6	.2	4.3
1988–89	L.A. Clippers	9	0	12.7	.438	–	.750	**2.2**	1.9	.6	**.3**	3.8
Career		260	13	11.3	.435	.077	.805	1.4	1.2	.6	.1	4.9

==== Playoffs ====
Year	Team	GP	GS	MPG	FG%	3P%	FT%	RPG	APG	SPG	BPG	PPG
1985	Cleveland	2	0	3.5	**.500**	–	–	.0	.5	.0	.0	1.0
1987	Seattle	**14**	0	**18.2**	.479	.000	**.750**	**2.4**	**2.1**	**1.1**	**.1**	**8.6**
1988	Seattle	5	0	14.0	.438	.000	–	1.6	1.8	.6	.0	2.8
Career		21	0	15.8	.473	.000	.750	2.0	1.9	.9	.0	6.5
