= 1982–83 Philadelphia 76ers season =

Third NBA championship season, second in Philadelphia

- NBA champions
- Conference champions
- Division champions
- Head coach: Billy Cunningham
- General manager: Pat Williams
- Owners: Harold Katz
- Arena: The Spectrum

Results
- Record: 65–17 (.793)
- Place: Division: 1st (Atlantic); Conference: 1st (Eastern)
- Playoff finish: NBA champions (Defeated Lakers 4–0)
- Stats at Basketball Reference

Local media
- Television: WPHL-TV; PRISM
- Radio: WIP

The 1982–83 Philadelphia 76ers season was the 37th season of the franchise (going back to their days as the Syracuse Nationals) and their 20th season in Philadelphia. The 76ers entered the season as runners-up in the 1982 NBA Finals, where they lost to the Los Angeles Lakers in six games.

Harold Katz bought the franchise in 1982. On his watch, the final piece of the championship puzzle was completed before the 1982–83 season when the Sixers acquired free-agent center Moses Malone from the Houston Rockets in a sign-and-trade for Caldwell Jones, joining an already stacked roster led by Hall of Famers Julius Erving, Maurice Cheeks and Bobby Jones, as well as All-Star Andrew Toney. They went on to dominate the regular season, ending the year with a 65–17 record in what is still their second-highest winning season in franchise history.

Erving was the team captain and was named the NBA All Star Game MVP, while Malone was named the league's MVP. When reporters asked how the playoffs would run, he answered, "fo’, fo’, fo’", predicting that the Sixers would need to play only four games in each of the three playoff series to win the title.

The Sixers backed up Malone's boast, breezing through the Eastern Conference playoffs, sweeping the New York Knicks in the Semifinals, then beating the Milwaukee Bucks in five games in the Conference Finals. They went on to win their third NBA championship with a four-game sweep of the defending NBA champion Los Angeles Lakers, who had defeated them the season before. Malone was named the Finals MVP, and his prediction turned out to be only one game off, as some used the adapted phrase "fo', fi', fo'" reflecting their one playoff loss to the Bucks.

Regarded as one of the greatest teams in history, their 12–1 playoff record still ranks as the third-best in league history after the 2016–17 Warriors, who went 16–1, and the 2000–01 Lakers, who went 15–1 en route to the NBA title - coincidentally beating the 76ers in the finals. The Philadelphia-based group Pieces of a Dream had a minor hit in 1983 with the R&B song "Fo-Fi-Fo", which title was prompted by Malone's quip.

As of 2026, this remains the third and last NBA championship in 76ers franchise history, though they made their above-mentioned NBA Finals appearance in 2001, losing to the Lakers.

== Draft picks ==
Round	Pick	Player	Position	Nationality	School/Club team
1	22	Mark McNamara	C/F	United States	California
2	36	J.J. Anderson	SF	United States	Bradley
2	45	Russ Schoene	PF	United States	Tennessee-Chattanooga
3	68	Dale Solomon		United States	Virginia Tech
4	91	Bruce Atkins		United States	Duquesne
5	114	Donald Mason		United States	Fresno State
6	137	Kevin Boyle		United States	Iowa
7	160	Keith Hilliard		United States	Southwest Missouri State
8	183	Donald Seals		United States	Jackson State
9	204	George Melton		United States	Cheyney (PA)
10	224	Randy Burkert		United States	Drexel

== Roster ==
Philadelphia 76ers roster
Players

Pos.	No.	Player	Height	Weight	DOB	From
PG	10	Maurice Cheeks	6 ft 1 in (1.85 m)	180 lb (82 kg)	1956-09-08	West Texas A&M
PF/C	25	Earl Cureton	6 ft 9 in (2.06 m)	210 lb (95 kg)	1957-09-03	Detroit Mercy
PG	14	Franklin Edwards	6 ft 1 in (1.85 m)	170 lb (77 kg)	1959-02-02	Cleveland State
SF	6	Julius Erving	6 ft 6 in (1.98 m)	210 lb (95 kg)	1950-02-22	UMass
PF	8	Marc Iavaroni	6 ft 8 in (2.03 m)	210 lb (95 kg)	1956-09-15	Virginia
C	45	Clemon Johnson	6 ft 10 in (2.08 m)	240 lb (109 kg)	1956–09–12	Florida A&M
SF	33	Reggie Johnson	6 ft 9 in (2.06 m)	205 lb (93 kg)	1957–06–25	Tennessee
PF	24	Bobby Jones	6 ft 9 in (2.06 m)	210 lb (95 kg)	1951-12-18	North Carolina
C	2	Moses Malone	6 ft 11 in (2.11 m)	240 lb (109 kg)	1955-03-23	Petersburg High School
C	31	Mark McNamara	6 ft 11 in (2.11 m)	235 lb (107 kg)	1959-06-08	California
SG	4	Clint Richardson	6 ft 3 in (1.91 m)	195 lb (88 kg)	1956-08-07	Seattle
SG	22	Andrew Toney	6 ft 3 in (1.91 m)	178 lb (81 kg)	1957-11-23	Louisiana

Coaches
Head coach
- Billy Cunningham
Assistant(s)
- Matt Guokas
- Jack McMahon

Legend
- (DP) Unsigned draft pick
- (FA) Free agent
- (S) Suspended
- Injured

== Regular season ==
=== Season standings ===
Atlantic Division	W	L	PCT	GB	Home	Road	Div
y-Philadelphia 76ers	65	17	.793	–	35–6	30–11	15–9
x-Boston Celtics	56	26	.683	9	33–8	23–18	14–10
x-New Jersey Nets	49	33	.598	16	30–11	19–22	11–13
x-New York Knicks	44	38	.537	21	26–15	18–23	10–14
Washington Bullets	42	40	.512	23	27–14	15–26	10–14

#	Eastern Conference				
#	Team	W	L	PCT	GB
1	z-Philadelphia 76ers	65	17	.793	–
2	y-Milwaukee Bucks	51	31	.622	14
3	x-Boston Celtics	56	26	.683	9
4	x-New Jersey Nets	49	33	.598	16
5	x-New York Knicks	44	38	.537	21
6	x-Atlanta Hawks	43	39	.524	22
7	Washington Bullets	42	40	.512	23
8	Detroit Pistons	37	45	.451	28
9	Chicago Bulls	28	54	.341	37
10	Cleveland Cavaliers	23	59	.280	42
11	Indiana Pacers	20	62	.244	45

== Game log ==
=== Regular season ===
1982–83 Game Log
Total: 65–17 (Home: 35–6; Road: 30–11)
October: 2–0 (Home: 1–0; Road 1–0)

Game	Date	Opponent	Score	Location	Record
1	October 29	@ New York	W 104–89	Madison Square Garden	1–0
2	October 30	New Jersey Nets	110–99	The Spectrum	2–0

November: 11–3 (Home: 7–2; Road 4–1)

Game	Date	Opponent	Score	Location	Record
3	November 3	San Diego Clippers	130–111	The Spectrum	3–0
4	November 5	@ Detroit Pistons	120–109	Pontiac Silverdome	4–0
5	November 6	Boston	W 119–115	The Spectrum	5–0
6	November 10	Chicago Bulls	145–108	The Spectrum	6–0
7	November 12	Indiana Pacers	108–117	The Spectrum	6–1
8	November 13	@ New Jersey Nets	110–100	Brendan Byrne Arena	7–1
9	November 14	Washington Bullets	102–93	The Spectrum	8–1
10	November 17	Detroit Pistons	120–103	The Spectrum	9–1
11	November 19	Milwaukee	W 121–109	The Spectrum	10–1
12	November 23	Portland	L 103–106	The Spectrum	10–2
13	November 24	@ Indiana Pacers	121–106	Market Square Arena	11–2
14	November 26	@ Cleveland Cavaliers	120–102	Richfield Coliseum	12–2
15	November 27	Utah Jazz	126–113	The Spectrum	13–2
16	November 30	@ Atlanta Hawks	97–111	The Omni	13–3

December: 11–2 (Home: 5–0; Road 6–2)

Game	Date	Opponent	Score	Location	Record
17	December 2	@ Phoenix Suns	116–108	Arizona Veterans Memorial Coliseum	14–3
18	December 3	@ San Diego Clippers	127–110	San Diego Sports Arena	15–3
19	December 5	@ Los Angeles	W 114–104	The Forum	16–3
20	December 8	Atlanta Hawks	132–85	The Spectrum	17–3
21	December 10	@ Boston	L 97–123	Boston Garden	17–4
22	December 11	Detroit Pistons	128–111	The Spectrum	18–4
23	December 15	Cleveland Cavaliers	99–93	The Spectrum	19–4
24	December 17	New York	109–95	The Spectrum	20–4
25	December 18	@ Washington Bullets	97–100	Capital Centre	20–5
26	December 21	Boston	W 122–105	The Spectrum	21–5
27	December 26	@ San Antonio	W 124–122	HemisFair Arena	22–5
28	December 28	@ Houston Rockets	104–93	The Summit	23–5
29	December 29	@ Dallas Mavericks	126–116	Reunion Arena	24–5

January: 14–1 (Home: 7–0; Road 7–1)

Game	Date	Opponent	Score	Location	Record
30	January 5	Los Angeles	W 122–120	The Spectrum	25–5
31	January 7	@ Washington Bullets	106–89	Capital Centre	26–5
32	January 8	Kansas City Kings	125–113	The Spectrum	27–5
33	January 11	@ Atlanta Hawks	109–99	The Omni	28–5
34	January 12	Milwaukee	W 122–121	The Spectrum	29–5
35	January 14	@ Detroit Pistons	115–105	Pontiac Silverdome	30–5
36	January 15	Indiana Pacers	114–105	The Spectrum	31–5
37	January 18	@ Cleveland Cavaliers	98–90	Richfield Coliseum	32–5
38	January 19	Chicago Bulls	126–106	The Spectrum	33–5
39	January 21	Seattle SuperSonics	130–117	The Spectrum	34–5
40	January 23	@ Milwaukee	L 96–107	MECCA Arena	34–6
41	January 25	@ Chicago Bulls	116–99	Chicago Stadium	35–6
42	January 26	Phoenix Suns	113–102	The Spectrum	36–6
43	January 28	@ Kansas City Kings	114–99	Kemper Arena	37–6
44	January 29	@ Utah Jazz	126–109	Salt Palace	38–6

February: 11–1 (Home: 7–0; Road 4–1)

Game	Date	Opponent	Score	Location	Record
45	February 1	@ Denver	W 133–124	McNichols Sports Arena	39–6
46	February 3	@ Golden State Warriors	117–111	Oakland–Alameda County Coliseum Arena	40–6
47	February 4	@ Portland	L 109–115	Memorial Coliseum	40–7
48	February 6	@ Seattle SuperSonics	97–96	Kingdome	41–7
49	February 9	Atlanta Hawks	106–93	The Spectrum	42–7
50	February 10	@ Chicago Bulls	116–110	Chicago Stadium	43–7
51	February 16	Denver	W 116–95	The Spectrum	44–7
52	February 18	Houston Rockets	127–98	The Spectrum	45–7
53	February 20	New York	W 104–89	The Spectrum	46–7
54	February 23	Dallas Mavericks	133–101	The Spectrum	47–7
55	February 25	Chicago Bulls	116–111	The Spectrum	48–7
56	February 27	Golden State Warriors	115–104	The Spectrum	49–7

March: 11–5 (Home: 6–1; Road 5–4)

Game	Date	Opponent	Score	Location	Record
57	March 1	@ New York	W 106–94	Madison Square Garden	50–7
58	March 4	@ Boston	L 110–115	Boston Garden	50–8
59	March 6	@ New Jersey Nets	106–112	Brendan Byrne Arena	50–9
60	March 7	Detroit Pistons	123–114	The Spectrum	51–9
61	March 12	@ Washington Bullets	95–86	Capital Centre	52–9
62	March 13	Washington Bullets	97–93	The Spectrum	53–9
63	March 15	@ Indiana Pacers	132–128	Market Square Arena	54–9
64	March 16	Boston	W 105–100	The Spectrum	55–9
65	March 19	@ Milwaukee	W 105–97	MECCA Arena	56–9
66	March 20	@ Detroit Pistons	121–119	Pontiac Silverdome	57–9
67	March 22	@ New York	L 76–89	Madison Square Garden	57–10
68	March 23	Milwaukee	W 104–101	The Spectrum	58–10
69	March 25	New Jersey Nets	92–101	The Spectrum	58–11
70	March 27	Cleveland Cavaliers	94–80	The Spectrum	59–11
71	March 29	@ Chicago Bulls	95–97	Chicago Stadium	59–12
72	March 30	Atlanta Hawks	120–113	The Spectrum	60–12

April: 5–5 (Home: 2–3; Road 3–2)

Game	Date	Opponent	Score	Location	Record
73	April 1	New Jersey Nets	104–111	The Spectrum	60–13
74	April 3	@ Cleveland Cavaliers	96–84	Richfield Coliseum	61–13
75	April 5	@ Milwaukee	W 116–108	MECCA Arena	62–13
76	April 6	San Antonio	L 109–112	The Spectrum	62–14
77	April 8	Indiana Pacers	126–118	The Spectrum	63–14
78	April 10	New York	W 113–97	The Spectrum	64–14
79	April 12	@ Atlanta Hawks	97–102	The Omni	64–15
80	April 13	Washington Bullets	76–95	The Spectrum	64–16
81	April 15	@ New Jersey Nets	100–98	Brendan Byrne Arena	65–16
82	April 17	@ Boston	L 101–114	Boston Garden	65–17

1982–83 Schedule

=== Detailed records ===
Eastern Conference
Opponent	Home	Away	Total	Pct.	Points scored	Points allowed
Atlantic Division
Boston Celtics	3–0	0–3	3–3	.500	654	672
New Jersey Nets	1–2	2–1	3–3	.500	622	621
New York Knicks	3–0	2–1	5–1	.833	612	553
Philadelphia 76ers	—	—	—	—	—	—
	7–2	4–5	11–7	.611	1888	1846
Central Division
Atlanta Hawks	3–0	1–2	4–2	.667	661	603
Milwaukee Bucks	3–0	2–1	5–1	.833	664	643
	6–0	3–3	9–3	.750	1325	1246

Western Conference
Opponent	Home	Away	Total	Pct.	Points scored	Points allowed
Midwest Division
Denver Nuggets	1–0	1–0	2–0	1.000	249	219
San Antonio Spurs	0–1	1–0	1–1	.500	233	234
	1–1	2–0	3–1	.750	482	453
Pacific Division
Los Angeles Lakers	1–0	1–0	2–0	1.000	236	224
Phoenix Suns	1–0	1–0	2–0	1.000	229	210
Portland Trail Blazers	0–1	0–1	0–2	.000	212	221
Seattle SuperSonics	1–0	1–0	2–0	1.000	227	213
	3–1	3–1	6–2	.750	904	868

== Playoffs ==
1983 playoff game log
Eastern Conference Semifinals: 4–0 (home: 2–0; road: 2–0)

Game	Date	Team	Score	High points	High rebounds	High assists	Location Attendance	Series
1	April 24	New York	W 112–102	Moses Malone (38)	Moses Malone (17)	Maurice Cheeks (10)	The Spectrum; 14,375	1–0
2	April 27	New York	W 98–91	Moses Malone (30)	Moses Malone (17)	Maurice Cheeks (6)	The Spectrum; 15,829	2–0
3	April 30	@ New York	W 107–105	Moses Malone (28)	Moses Malone (14)	Maurice Cheeks (7)	Madison Square Garden; 17,735	3–0
4	May 1	@ New York	W 105–102	Moses Malone (29)	Moses Malone (14)	Maurice Cheeks (7)	Madison Square Garden; 15,457	4–0

Eastern Conference Finals: 4–1 (home: 3–0; road: 1–1)

Game	Date	Team	Score	High points	High rebounds	High assists	Location Attendance	Series
1	May 8	Milwaukee	W 111–109 (OT)	Maurice Cheeks (26)	Moses Malone (12)	Maurice Cheeks (7)	The Spectrum; 18,482	1–0
2	May 11	Milwaukee	W 87–81	Moses Malone (26)	Moses Malone (17)	Cheeks, Toney (4)	The Spectrum; 18,482	2–0
3	May 14	@ Milwaukee	W 104–96	Julius Erving (26)	Moses Malone (14)	Maurice Cheeks (9)	MECCA Arena; 11,052	3–0
4	May 15	@ Milwaukee	L 94–100	Andrew Toney (24)	Moses Malone (12)	Maurice Cheeks (8)	MECCA Arena; 11,052	3–1
5	May 18	Milwaukee	W 115–103	Andrew Toney (30)	Moses Malone (17)	Maurice Cheeks (8)	The Spectrum; 18,482	4–1

NBA Finals: 4–0 (home: 2–0; road: 2–0)

Game	Date	Team	Score	High points	High rebounds	High assists	Location Attendance	Series
1	May 22	Los Angeles	W 113–107	Moses Malone (27)	Moses Malone (18)	Julius Erving (9)	The Spectrum; 18,482	1–0
2	May 26	Los Angeles	W 103–93	Moses Malone (24)	Moses Malone (12)	Maurice Cheeks (8)	The Spectrum; 18,482	2–0
3	May 29	@ Los Angeles	W 111–94	Moses Malone (28)	Moses Malone (19)	Moses Malone (6)	The Forum; 17,505	3–0
4	May 31	@ Los Angeles	W 115–108	Moses Malone (24)	Moses Malone (23)	Andrew Toney (9)	The Forum; 17,505	4–0

1983 schedule

== NBA Finals ==
The 1983 NBA Finals was the championship round of the 1982–83 season.

The 76ers went on to capture their second NBA championship in Philadelphia, and the third as the 76ers/Nationals franchise as they swept the New York Knicks, and proceeded to beat the Milwaukee Bucks in five games. They finally finished it off with a four-game sweep of the Los Angeles Lakers, who had defeated them the season before, making this the only NBA championship not to be won by either the Lakers or the Boston Celtics from 1980 to 1988.

Said head coach Billy Cunningham, "The difference from last year was Moses." Malone was named MVP of the 1983 Finals, as well as league MVP for the third time in his career. The 76ers completed one of the most dominating playoff runs in league history with a 12–1 mark after league and NBA Finals MVP Moses promised "Fo', fo', fo" (as in "four, four, four" – four wins to win each playoff series). The 76ers were also led by Julius Erving, Maurice Cheeks, Andrew Toney, and Bobby Jones.

The 1983 NBA Finals was the last to end before June 1. This championship is especially noted because it would be the last major sports championship for the city of Philadelphia until the Phillies won the 2008 World Series. At the time, no other city with all four professional sports teams had a championship drought last as long as that from 1983 to 2008 (25 years). When the Flyers played for the 2010 Stanley Cup, The Ottawa Citizen reported that the main reason for that lengthy championship drought was because the only years the city's teams played for championships during that time were years presidents were inaugurated. The city's teams had lost championships during such years, beginning with the 76ers themselves in 1977. The exceptions were the Phillies in 1983 and the Flyers in 1987.

Following the 1983 NBA Finals, a video documentary called "That Championship Feeling" recaps the NBA Playoff action that year. Dick Stockton narrated the video, and Irene Cara's 1983 hit single "What A Feeling" is the official theme song for the video documentary. For the first time, NBA Entertainment used videotape instead of film for all the on-court and off-court footage.

== Awards, records, and legacy ==
- Moses Malone, NBA Most Valuable Player Award
- Moses Malone, NBA Finals Most Valuable Player Award
- Bobby Jones, NBA Sixth Man of the Year Award
- Moses Malone, All-NBA First Team
- Julius Erving, All-NBA First Team
- Bobby Jones, NBA All-Defensive First Team
- Maurice Cheeks, NBA All-Defensive First Team
- Moses Malone, NBA All-Defensive First Team

At the time, their 65–17 regular season record ranked as the fifth-greatest regular season win total in NBA history. Previously, only the 1972 Lakers (69–13), 1967 Sixers (68–13), 1971 Bucks (66–16), and 1973 Celtics (68–14; who lost the Conference Finals) exceeded this win total.

In addition, their regular season winning percentage of .793 was only bettered by three teams before 1968 (the 1947 Washington Capitals of .817; 1950 Syracuse Nations of .797 and aforementioned 1967 Sixers of .840), when NBA teams played less than an 82-game regular season. Both the Capitols and the Nationals failed to win an NBA championship.

Their .8105 winning percentage, combined regular season and postseason (77–18) in 1983, has been topped since by just five teams, the 1986 Celtics (.820, also with 18 losses), 1996 and 97 Bulls (.870 and .832), 2016 Warriors (.830, with 18 losses as well as an NBA Finals loss), and 2017 Warriors (.838).

Through the first 66 regular season games, their record stood at 57–9. The 2016 Golden State Warriors started only 3 games better at 60–6 before breaking the regular season record with 73 wins.
