= Mark McNamara =

American basketball player (1959–2020)

Personal information
- Born: June 8, 1959 San Jose, California, U.S.
- Died: April 27, 2020 (aged 60) Nevada, U.S.
- Listed height: 6 ft 11 in (2.11 m)
- Listed weight: 235 lb (107 kg)

Career information
- High school: Del Mar (San Jose, California)
- College: Santa Clara (1977–1979); California (1980–1982)
- NBA draft: 1982: 1st round, 22nd overall pick
- Drafted by: Philadelphia 76ers
- Playing career: 1982–1993
- Position: Center / power forward
- Number: 31, 35

Career history
- 1982–1983: Philadelphia 76ers
- 1983–1984: San Antonio Spurs
- 1984–1985: Kansas City Kings
- 1985–1986: Cortan Livorno
- 1986–1988: Philadelphia 76ers
- 1988–1990: Los Angeles Lakers
- 1990: Orlando Magic
- 1991: Juver Murcia
- 1991: Real Madrid
- 1992–1993: Rapid City Thrillers

Career highlights
- NBA champion (1983); Third-team All-American – UPI (1982); First-team All-Pac-10 (1982)
- Stats at NBA.com
- Stats at Basketball Reference

Mark Robert McNamara (June 8, 1959 – April 27, 2020) was an American professional basketball player who was selected by the Philadelphia 76ers in the first round (22nd pick overall) of the 1982 NBA draft.

A 6'11" power forward-center from the University of California, Berkeley, McNamara played in eight NBA seasons from 1982 to 1985 and from 1986 to 1991. He played for the 76ers, San Antonio Spurs, Kansas City Kings, Los Angeles Lakers and Orlando Magic. McNamara also dabbled in acting and appeared in the 1985 TV movie "Ewoks: The Battle for Endor".

== NBA career ==
Drafted by the Philadelphia 76ers, he spent his rookie season with the team. Playing alongside Moses Malone, McNamara averaged 2.2 points and 2.1 rebounds per game across 36 games, and earned his only NBA championship with the 76ers.

McNamara's best statistical year as a professional came during the 1983–84 season as a member of the Spurs, appearing in 70 games and averaging 5.5 ppg and 4.5 rpg.

In his NBA career, McNamara played in 278 games and scored a total of 980 points.

== Post-NBA ==
McNamara was an assistant coach of the boys' basketball team at Haines High School in Haines, Alaska, and led the team to two state titles. McNamara helped with basketball camps around Alaska.

== Death ==
McNamara died on April 27, 2020, at age 60. He reportedly died of heart failure, culminating from years of cardiac issues.

== Career statistics ==
Legend
| GP | Games played | GS | Games started | MPG | Minutes per game |
| FG% | Field goal percentage | 3P% | 3-point field goal percentage | FT% | Free throw percentage |
| RPG | Rebounds per game | APG | Assists per game | SPG | Steals per game |
| BPG | Blocks per game | PPG | Points per game | **Bold** | Career high |
| † | Won an NBA championship |

=== NBA ===
==== Regular season ====
| Year | Team | GP | GS | MPG | FG% | 3P% | FT% | RPG | APG | SPG | BPG | PPG |
|---|---|---|---|---|---|---|---|---|---|---|---|---|
| 1982–83† | Philadelphia | 36 | 2 | 5.2 | .453 | – | .444 | 2.1 | .2 | .1 | .1 | 2.2 |
| 1983–84 | San Antonio | **70** | 3 | **14.8** | .621 | – | .471 | **4.5** | **.4** | **.2** | .2 | **5.5** |
| 1984–85 | San Antonio | 12 | 0 | 5.3 | **.667** | – | .500 | 1.4 | .0 | **.2** | .1 | 2.8 |
| 1984–85 | Kansas City | 33 | 0 | 6.4 | .483 | – | .523 | 1.7 | .2 | **.2** | .2 | 2.4 |
| 1986–87 | Philadelphia | 11 | 1 | 10.3 | .467 | – | .368 | 3.3 | .2 | .1 | .0 | 3.2 |
| 1987–88 | Philadelphia | 42 | **18** | 13.8 | .391 | – | **.727** | 3.7 | **.4** | .1 | **.3** | 3.6 |
| 1988–89 | L.A. Lakers | 39 | 0 | 8.2 | .500 | – | .628 | 2.6 | .3 | .1 | .1 | 2.9 |
| 1989–90 | L.A. Lakers | 33 | 1 | 5.8 | .442 | – | .650 | 1.9 | .1 | .1 | .0 | 3.1 |
| 1990–91 | Orlando | 2 | 0 | 6.5 | .000 | – | – | 2.0 | .0 | .0 | .0 | .0 |
| Career | | 278 | 25 | 9.7 | .512 | – | .548 | 3.0 | .3 | .1 | .1 | 3.5 |

==== Playoffs ====
| Year | Team | GP | GS | MPG | FG% | 3P% | FT% | RPG | APG | SPG | BPG | PPG |
|---|---|---|---|---|---|---|---|---|---|---|---|---|
| 1983† | Philadelphia | 2 | 0 | 1.0 | **1.000** | – | – | .5 | .0 | .0 | .0 | **2.0** |
| 1987 | Philadelphia | 1 | 0 | 2.0 | **1.000** | – | – | **1.0** | .0 | .0 | .0 | **2.0** |
| 1989 | L.A. Lakers | **3** | 0 | 2.3 | .500 | – | **.500** | .3 | .0 | .0 | .0 | 1.0 |
| 1990 | L.A. Lakers | 2 | 0 | **2.5** | .250 | – | – | .5 | .0 | .0 | .0 | 1.0 |
| Career | | 8 | 0 | 2.0 | .556 | – | .500 | .5 | .0 | .0 | .0 | 1.4 |

== Film ==
McNamara worked as a stand-in for Peter Mayhew as Chewbacca on the set of Return of the Jedi.
