= Clemon Johnson =

American basketball player and coach

Personal information
- Born: September 12, 1956 (age 70) Monticello, Florida, U.S.
- Listed height: 6 ft 10 in (2.08 m)
- Listed weight: 240 lb (109 kg)

Career information
- High school: Florida A&M University School (Tallahassee, Florida)
- College: Florida A&M (1974–1978)
- NBA draft: 1978: 2nd round, 44th overall pick
- Drafted by: Portland Trail Blazers
- Playing career: 1978–1993
- Position: Center / power forward
- Number: 44, 45

Career history

Playing
- 1978–1979: Portland Trail Blazers
- 1979–1983: Indiana Pacers
- 1983–1986: Philadelphia 76ers
- 1986–1988: Seattle SuperSonics
- 1988–1991: Knorr Bologna
- 1991–1993: Lotus / Bialetti Montecatini

Coaching
- 2007–2011: Alaska–Fairbanks
- 2011–2014: Florida A&M

Career highlights
- NBA champion (1983); FIBA European Cup Winners' Cup champion (1990); Saporta Cup champion (1990); Italian Cup champion (1990)

Career NBA statistics
- Points: 4,102 (5.4 ppg)
- Rebounds: 3,508 (4.6 rpg)
- Assists: 744 (1.0 apg)
- Stats at NBA.com
- Stats at Basketball Reference

Clemon James Johnson Jr. (born September 12, 1956) is an American former professional basketball player and the former head basketball coach at Florida A&M. Johnson was a 6'10", 240 lb (110 kg) center who played 761 games for four teams during his 10 seasons in the National Basketball Association. From 1974 to 1978 he played college basketball at Florida A&M University where he earned a bachelor's degree in economics and a master's degree in sports management.

Johnson was selected with the 22nd pick of the second round of the 1978 NBA draft by the Portland Trail Blazers. He was acquired along with a 1984 third-round selection (48th overall–Georgia forward James Banks) by the Philadelphia 76ers from the Indiana Pacers for Russ Schoene, a 1983 first-rounder (23rd overall–Mitchell Wiggins) and a 1984 second-rounder (29th overall–Stuart Gray) on February 15, 1983. He famously said that his trade to the 76ers was "like going from the outhouse to the White House." He was a reserve with the team when it won the NBA Championship later that season. After his NBA playing days ended in 1988, Johnson extended his career overseas in Italy.

After his professional basketball career, Johnson became an economics teacher and high school basketball coach in Tallahassee, Florida. His son Chad played college basketball at the University of Pittsburgh until 2002.

In May 2007, Clemon Johnson was named interim head coach of the University of Alaska Fairbanks Nanooks men's basketball team. He served as interim head coach in 2007–08 and was named head coach following that season. He has coached the team for four total seasons (2007–08, 2008–09, 2009–10 and 2010–11). On May 6, 2011, Johnson was named head coach at his alma mater, Florida A&M. After three seasons and a 32–64 record, Johnson was fired from Florida A&M by athletic director Kellen Winslow.

== Career playing statistics ==
Legend
GP	Games played	GS	Games started	MPG	Minutes per game
FG%	Field goal percentage	3P%	3-point field goal percentage	FT%	Free throw percentage
RPG	Rebounds per game	APG	Assists per game	SPG	Steals per game
BPG	Blocks per game	PPG	Points per game	**Bold**	Career high
†	Won an NBA championship	*	Led the league

=== NBA ===
==== Regular season ====
Year	Team	GP	GS	MPG	FG%	3P%	FT%	RPG	APG	SPG	BPG	PPG
1978–79	Portland	74		10.7	.470		.486	3.1	1.1	.3	.5	3.2
1979–80	Indiana	79	0	19.5	.503	–	.632	5.0	1.5	.6	**1.5**	6.0
1980–81	Indiana	81	2	20.3	.504	.000	.593	5.8	1.8	.5	**1.5**	7.2
1981–82	Indiana	79	**42**	**25.1**	.487	–	.651	**7.2**	1.6	.8	1.4	9.5
1982–83	Indiana	**51***	7	23.8	**.521**	.000	.631	6.3	**2.3**	**1.0**	1.2	**9.7**
1982–83†	Philadelphia	**32***	4	21.8	.500	–	.586	6.4	.8	.5	.9	6.8
1983–84	Philadelphia	80	10	21.5	.468	–	.611	5.0	.7	.4	.8	5.7
1984–85	Philadelphia	58	0	15.1	.498	.000	**.735**	3.8	.6	.3	.8	4.7
1985–86	Philadelphia	75	2	14.3	.471	–	.630	3.4	.2	.3	.8	3.5
1986–87	Seattle	78	7	13.5	.494	.000	.636	3.6	.3	.3	.5	3.2
1987–88	Seattle	74	26	9.8	.467	–	.688	2.4	.2	.2	.3	1.6
Career		761	100	17.5	.492	.000	.621	4.6	1.0	.5	.9	5.4

==== Playoffs ====
Year	Team	GP	GS	MPG	FG%	3P%	FT%	RPG	APG	SPG	BPG	PPG
1979	Portland	3		15.7	.364		.545	5.7	.7	.7	**1.3**	4.7
1981	Indiana	2		**27.5**	.417	–	.500	**10.0**	**1.5**	**2.0**	1.0	**7.5**
1983†	Philadelphia	12		16.8	.510	–	.000	3.6	.6	.3	.4	4.2
1984	Philadelphia	5		9.0	.333	–	–	1.2	.0	.2	.8	1.6
1985	Philadelphia	13	0	12.7	.394	.000	**.762**	2.8	.2	.2	.5	3.2
1986	Philadelphia	12	2	25.3	**.547**	–	.640	5.0	.7	.9	**1.3**	6.2
1987	Seattle	**14**	**7**	18.7	.453	–	.632	3.5	.3	.5	1.1	4.3
1988	Seattle	5	0	7.8	.429	–	.500	1.4	.0	.2	.2	1.4
Career		66	9	16.9	.465	.000	.609	3.6	.4	.5	.8	4.1

== Head coaching record ==
Record table
Season	Team	Overall	Conference	Standing	Postseason
Alaska Fairbanks (Great Northwest Athletic Conference) (2007–2011)
2007–08	Alaska-Fairbanks	5-22			
2008–09	Alaska-Fairbanks	6-19	3-13		
2009–10	Alaska-Fairbanks	9-16	4-12		
2010–11	Alaska-Fairbanks	8-17	5-13		
Alaska-Fairbanks:		28–74 (.275)	17-38		
Florida A&M (MEAC) (2011–2014)
2011–12	Florida A&M	10-23	6-10	8th	
2012–13	Florida A&M	8-23	5-11	9th	
2013–14	Florida A&M	14-18	8-8	6th	
Florida A&M:		32–64 (.333)	19-29		
Total:		60–138 (.303)			
National champion Postseason invitational champion Conference regular season champion Conference regular season and conference tournament champion Division regular season champion Division regular season and conference tournament champion Conference tournament champion
