= Danny Young (basketball) =

American basketball player (born 1962)

Personal information
- Born: July 26, 1962 (age 64) Raleigh, North Carolina, U.S.
- Listed height: 6 ft 3 in (1.91 m)
- Listed weight: 175 lb (79 kg)

Career information
- High school: William G. Enloe (Raleigh, North Carolina)
- College: Wake Forest (1980–1984)
- NBA draft: 1984: 2nd round, 39th overall pick
- Drafted by: Seattle SuperSonics
- Playing career: 1984–1994
- Position: Point guard
- Number: 22, 21, 20

Career history
- 1984: Seattle SuperSonics
- 1984–1985: Wyoming Wildcatters
- 1985–1988: Seattle SuperSonics
- 1988–1992: Portland Trail Blazers
- 1992: Los Angeles Clippers
- 1992–1993: Detroit Pistons
- 1993–1994: Limoges
- 1994: Milwaukee Bucks

Career highlights
- French League champion (1994); French Cup champion (1994)
- Stats at NBA.com
- Stats at Basketball Reference

Danny Richardson Young (born July 26, 1962) is an American former professional basketball player. A 6' 3" guard who attended Wake Forest University, he played ten seasons (1984–1993; 1994–1995) in the NBA, spending time with the Seattle SuperSonics, Portland Trail Blazers, Los Angeles Clippers, Detroit Pistons, and Milwaukee Bucks. Young was a key reserve on the 1990 Blazers team that reached the NBA Finals, and he retired with 2,622 NBA career points and 1,674 assists.

== Seattle Supersonics ==
At the end of his time in Seattle, Young was low in the rotation, behind several other backup guards. Seattle attempted to trade him but was unsuccessful. Consequently, they waived him on November 3, 1988.

== Portland Trail Blazers ==
Portland signed Young the same day he was waived. He immediately became the third guard for the Blazers, behind Clyde Drexler and Terry Porter. He was waived from the team January 1992 in order to make room for Lamont Strothers.

== Career statistics ==
Legend
GP	Games played	GS	Games started	MPG	Minutes per game
FG%	Field goal percentage	3P%	3-point field goal percentage	FT%	Free throw percentage
RPG	Rebounds per game	APG	Assists per game	SPG	Steals per game
BPG	Blocks per game	PPG	Points per game	**Bold**	Career high
*	Led the league

=== NBA ===
==== Regular season ====
Year	Team	GP	GS	MPG	FG%	3P%	FT%	RPG	APG	SPG	BPG	PPG
1984–85	Seattle	3	0	8.7	.200	.000	.000	1.0	0.7	1.0	0.0	1.3
1985–86	Seattle	**82**	**29**	**23.2**	.506	.324	.849	**1.5**	3.7	**1.3**	**0.1**	**6.9**
1986–87	Seattle	73	26	20.3	.458	.367	.831	**1.5**	**4.8**	1.0	0.0	4.8
1987–88	Seattle	77	0	12.3	.408	.286	.811	1.0	2.8	0.7	0.0	3.2
1988–89	Portland	48	2	19.8	.460	.340	.781	**1.5**	2.6	1.1	**0.1**	6.2
1989–90	Portland	**82***	8	17.0	.421	.271	.813	**1.5**	2.8	1.0	0.0	4.7
1990–91	Portland	75	1	12.0	.380	.346	.911	1.0	1.9	0.7	**0.1**	3.8
1991–92	Portland	18	0	7.4	.400	.300	.714	0.5	1.1	0.3	0.0	2.5
1991–92	Los Angeles	44	5	20.2	.391	.333	.887	**1.5**	3.5	0.9	**0.1**	5.3
1992–93	Detroit	65	2	12.9	.413	.324	.875	0.7	1.8	0.5	**0.1**	2.9
1994–95	Milwaukee	7	0	11.0	**.529**	**.417**	**1.000**	0.7	1.7	0.6	0.0	3.4
Career		574	73	16.6	.437	.327	.835	1.2	2.9	0.9	0.1	4.6

==== Playoffs ====
Year	Team	GP	GS	MPG	FG%	3P%	FT%	RPG	APG	SPG	BPG	PPG
1986–87	Seattle	14	0	14.9	.404	.313	**1.000**	1.1	3.4	**1.1**	0.0	4.1
1987–88	Seattle	5	0	19.0	.524	.000	**1.000**	2.0	3.8	0.4	**0.4**	6.4
1988–89	Portland	3	**1**	**22.0**	.462	.375	.500	**2.7**	**4.0**	0.3	0.0	**9.3**
1989–90	Portland	**21***	0	14.0	.389	**.379**	.704	1.4	1.5	0.7	0.1	4.1
1990–91	Portland	7	0	5.1	**.545**	.000	.000	0.0	1.0	0.0	0.0	1.7
1991–92	Los Angeles	3	0	3.7	.500	.000	.000	0.0	0.3	0.0	0.0	1.3
Career		53	1	13.4	.430	.322	.816	1.2	2.2	0.6	0.1	4.1

=== College ===
Year	Team	GP	GS	MPG	FG%	3P%	FT%	RPG	APG	SPG	BPG	PPG
1980–81	Wake Forest	29	0	16.9	.496	–	.688	1.3	1.7	1.0	0.1	5.1
1981–82	Wake Forest	30	30	31.5	**.508**	–	**.714**	**2.5**	4.4	1.6	0.2	10.6
1982–83	Wake Forest	31	31	32.2	.457	**.370**	.713	2.1	**5.0**	1.6	0.2	**12.8**
1983–84	Wake Forest	**32**	**32**	**32.6**	.456	–	.707	1.8	4.9	**2.2**	**0.3**	9.6
Career		122	93	28.5	.475	.370	.708	1.9	4.0	1.6	0.2	9.6

== Playing style ==
Not known for flamboyant play, Young was valued for his ball-handling skills and steady, mistake-free play.
