= 1984–85 Golden State Warriors season =

NBA professional basketball team season

- Head coach: Johnny Bach
- Arena: Oakland-Alameda County Coliseum Arena

Results
- Record: 22–60 (.268)
- Place: Division: 6th (Pacific); Conference: 12th (Western)
- Playoff finish: Did not qualify
- Stats at Basketball Reference

Local media
- Television: KBHK-TV
- Radio: KNBR

The 1984–85 Golden State Warriors season was the Warriors' 39th season in the NBA and 22nd in the San Francisco Bay Area.

== Draft picks ==
Round	Pick	Player	Position	Nationality	College
2	30	Steve Burtt	PG	United States	Iona
2	31	Jay Murphy	PF	United States	Boston College
2	35	Othell Wilson	PG	United States	Virginia
2	45	Gary Plummer	PF/C	United States	Boston University
3	55	Lewis Jackson		United States	Alabama State
5	101	Steve Bartek		United States	Doane
5	110	Scott McCollum		United States	Pepperdine
6	123	Tony Martin		United States	Wyoming
7	147	Cliff Higgins		United States	California State-Northridge
8	169	Paul Brozovich		United States	Nevada-Las Vegas
9	192	Mitch Arnold		United States	Fresno State
10	213	Tim Bell		United States	California-Riverside

== Roster ==
Golden State Warriors roster
Players

Pos.	No.	Player	Height	Weight	DOB	From
C	50	Chuck Aleksinas	6 ft 11 in (2.11 m)	260 lb (118 kg)		Connecticut
G	23	Mike Bratz	6 ft 2 in (1.88 m)	185 lb (84 kg)		Stanford
G	15	Steve Burtt	6 ft 2 in (1.88 m)	185 lb (84 kg)		Iona
G	32	Lester Conner	6 ft 4 in (1.93 m)	180 lb (82 kg)		Oregon State
G	21	Sleepy Floyd	6 ft 3 in (1.91 m)	170 lb (77 kg)		Georgetown
F	43	Mickey Johnson	6 ft 10 in (2.08 m)	190 lb (86 kg)		Aurora
F	44	Gary Plummer	6 ft 9 in (2.06 m)	215 lb (98 kg)		Boston University
G/F	45	Purvis Short	6 ft 7 in (2.01 m)	210 lb (95 kg)		Jackson State
F	13	Larry Smith	6 ft 8 in (2.03 m)	215 lb (98 kg)		Alcorn State
G/F	20	Terry Teagle	6 ft 5 in (1.96 m)	195 lb (88 kg)		Baylor
F	7	Peter Thibeaux	6 ft 7 in (2.01 m)	210 lb (95 kg)		Saint Mary's
F	50	Pete Verhoeven	6 ft 9 in (2.06 m)	215 lb (98 kg)		Fresno State
C	33	Jerome Whitehead	6 ft 10 in (2.08 m)	220 lb (100 kg)		Marquette
G	11	Othell Wilson	6 ft 0 in (1.83 m)	190 lb (86 kg)		Virginia

Coaches
Head coach
- Johnny Bach (Fordham)
Assistant(s)
- Bob Zuffelato (Central Connecticut State)

Legend
- (DP) Unsigned draft pick
- (FA) Free agent
- (S) Suspended
- Injured

== Regular season ==
=== Season standings ===
Pacific Division	W	L	PCT	GB	Home	Road	Div
y-Los Angeles Lakers	62	20	.756	–	36–5	26–15	18–12
x-Portland Trail Blazers	42	40	.512	20	33–8	15–26	17–13
x-Phoenix Suns	36	46	.439	26	32–9	10–31	14–16
Seattle SuperSonics	31	51	.378	31	31–10	10–31	16–14
Los Angeles Clippers	31	51	.378	31	27–14	10–31	13–17
Golden State Warriors	22	60	.268	40	25–16	5–36	12–18

#	Western Conference				
#	Team	W	L	PCT	GB
1	c-Los Angeles Lakers	62	20	.756	–
2	y-Denver Nuggets	52	30	.634	10
3	x-Houston Rockets	48	34	.585	14
4	x-Dallas Mavericks	44	38	.537	18
5	x-Portland Trail Blazers	42	40	.512	20
6	x-Utah Jazz	41	41	.500	21
7	x-San Antonio Spurs	41	41	.500	21
8	x-Phoenix Suns	36	46	.439	26
9	Seattle SuperSonics	31	51	.378	31
10	Los Angeles Clippers	31	51	.378	31
11	Kansas City Kings	31	51	.378	31
12	Golden State Warriors	22	60	.268	40

z - clinched division title
y - clinched division title
x - clinched playoff spot

== See also ==
- 1984-85 NBA season
