= 1984–85 San Antonio Spurs season =

- Head coach: Cotton Fitzsimmons
- General manager: Bob Bass
- Owner: Angelo Drossos
- Arena: HemisFair Arena

Results
- Record: 41–41 (.500)
- Place: Division: 5th (Midwest); Conference: 7th (Western)
- Playoff finish: First round (lost to Nuggets 2–3)
- Stats at Basketball Reference

Local media
- Television: KMOL-TV; Home Sports Entertainment
- Radio: WOAI

The 1984–85 San Antonio Spurs season was the Spurs' ninth season in the NBA, the 12th in San Antonio, and the 18th season as a franchise. This would be George Gervin's last season with the team before getting traded to the Chicago Bulls following the season. It was also Alvin Robertson's NBA debut.

== Draft picks ==
Round	Pick	Player	Position	Nationality	College
1	7	Alvin Robertson	SG	United States	Arkansas
3	57	Joe Binion	F	United States	North Carolina A&T State
4	78	John Devereaux		United States	Ohio
4	90	Ozell Jones	PF/C	United States	California State-Fullerton
5	100	Eric Richardson		United States	Alabama
6	124	Dion Brown		United States	Louisiana-Lafayette
7	146	Michael Pitts		United States	California
8	170	Danny Tarkanian		United States	Nevada-Las Vegas
9	191	Melvin Roseboro		United States	St. Mary's
10	214	Frank Rodriguez		United States	New Mexico State

== Roster ==
San Antonio Spurs roster
Players

Pos.	No.	Player	Height	Weight	DOB	From
SF	20	Gene Banks	6 ft 7 in (2.01 m)	215 lb (98 kg)		Duke
PF	45	Jeff Cook	6 ft 10 in (2.08 m)	215 lb (98 kg)		Idaho State
G/F	44	George Gervin	6 ft 7 in (2.01 m)	180 lb (82 kg)		Eastern Michigan
C	53	Artis Gilmore	7 ft 2 in (2.18 m)	240 lb (109 kg)		Jacksonville
PF	32	Marc Iavaroni	6 ft 8 in (2.03 m)	210 lb (95 kg)		Virginia
C	8	Ozell Jones	6 ft 11 in (2.11 m)	235 lb (107 kg)		Cal State Fullerton
SF	25	Billy Knight	6 ft 6 in (1.98 m)	195 lb (88 kg)		Pittsburgh
SF	34	Mike Mitchell	6 ft 7 in (2.01 m)	215 lb (98 kg)		Auburn
PG	00	Johnny Moore	6 ft 1 in (1.85 m)	175 lb (79 kg)		Texas
PG	4	John Paxson	6 ft 2 in (1.88 m)	185 lb (84 kg)		Notre Dame
SG	21	Alvin Robertson	6 ft 3 in (1.91 m)	185 lb (84 kg)		Arkansas
SF	22	David Thirdkill	6 ft 7 in (2.01 m)	195 lb (88 kg)		Bradley
SF	2	Linton Townes	6 ft 7 in (2.01 m)	190 lb (86 kg)		James Madison

Coaches
Head coach
- Cotton Fitzsimmons
Assistant(s)
- Gary Fitzsimmons
- Scotty Robertson

Legend
- (DP) Unsigned draft pick
- (FA) Free agent
- (S) Suspended
- Injured

Roster
Updated: April 12, 1985

== Regular season ==
=== Season standings ===
Midwest Division	W	L	PCT	GB	Home	Road	Div
y-Denver Nuggets	52	30	.634	–	34–7	18–23	17–13
x-Houston Rockets	48	34	.585	4	29–12	19–22	20–10
x-Dallas Mavericks	44	38	.537	8	24–17	20–21	14–16
x-Utah Jazz	41	41	.500	11	26–15	15–26	19–11
x-San Antonio Spurs	41	41	.500	11	30–11	11–30	12–18
Kansas City Kings	31	51	.378	21	23–18	8–33	8–22

#	Western Conference				
#	Team	W	L	PCT	GB
1	c-Los Angeles Lakers	62	20	.756	–
2	y-Denver Nuggets	52	30	.634	10
3	x-Houston Rockets	48	34	.585	14
4	x-Dallas Mavericks	44	38	.537	18
5	x-Portland Trail Blazers	42	40	.512	20
6	x-Utah Jazz	41	41	.500	21
7	x-San Antonio Spurs	41	41	.500	21
8	x-Phoenix Suns	36	46	.439	26
9	Seattle SuperSonics	31	51	.378	31
10	Los Angeles Clippers	31	51	.378	31
11	Kansas City Kings	31	51	.378	31
12	Golden State Warriors	22	60	.268	40

z - clinched division title
y - clinched division title
x - clinched playoff spot

== Game log ==
=== Regular season ===
1984–85 game log
Total: 41–41 (home: 30–11; road: 11–30)
October: 2–0 (home: 2–0; road: 0–0)

Game	Date	Team	Score	High points	High rebounds	High assists	Location Attendance	Record
1	October 27, 1984; 7:30 p.m. CDT	L.A. Lakers	W 113–112	Gervin (32)	Gilmore (21)	Moore (8)	HemisFair Arena; 13,506	1–0
2	October 30, 1984	Denver	W 126–118				HemisFair Arena	2–0

November: 5–9 (home: 4–3; road: 1–6)

Game	Date	Team	Score	High points	High rebounds	High assists	Location Attendance	Record
3	November 1, 1984	@ Golden State	W 123–108				Oakland-Alameda County Coliseum Arena	3–0
4	November 2, 1984; 9:30 p.m. CST	@ L.A. Lakers	L 100–119	Mitchell (20)	Robertson (7)	Moore (8)	The Forum; 13,550	3–1
5	November 4, 1984	New York	W 131–130 (2OT)				HemisFair Arena	4–1
6	November 6, 1984	Seattle	W 99–91				HemisFair Arena	5–1
7	November 7, 1984	@ Utah	L 124–136				Salt Palace Acord Arena	5–2
8	November 10, 1984	Cleveland	W 127–103				HemisFair Arena	6–2
9	November 13, 1984	@ Chicago	L 117–120				Chicago Stadium	6–3
10	November 14, 1984	@ Washington	L 106–125				Capital Centre	6–4
11	November 16, 1984	@ Indiana	L 117–128 (OT)				Market Square Arena	6–5
12	November 17, 1984	@ Houston	L 133–141				The Summit	6–6
13	November 21, 1984	Detroit	L 101–114				HemisFair Arena	6–7
14	November 24, 1984	Utah	L 117–123				HemisFair Arena	6–8
15	November 27, 1984	Houston	L 97–114				HemisFair Arena	6–9
16	November 29, 1984	Dallas	W 124–116				HemisFair Arena	7–9

December: 7–9 (home: 5–1; road: 2–8)

Game	Date	Team	Score	High points	High rebounds	High assists	Location Attendance	Record
17	December 1, 1984	L.A. Clippers	W 142–110				HemisFair Arena	8–9
18	December 4, 1984	Atlanta	W 114–106				HemisFair Arena	9–9
19	December 6, 1984	@ Portland	L 96–113				Memorial Coliseum	9–10
20	December 7, 1984	@ Seattle	W 117–114				Kingdome	10–10
21	December 9, 1984	@ L.A. Clippers	L 123–126				Los Angeles Memorial Sports Arena	10–11
22	December 11, 1984	@ Kansas City	L 120–121				Kemper Arena	10–12
23	December 12, 1984	Denver	W 126–105				HemisFair Arena	11–12
24	December 14, 1984	@ Dallas	L 102–119				Reunion Arena	11–13
25	December 15, 1984	Phoenix	W 120–111				HemisFair Arena	12–13
26	December 18, 1984	@ Cleveland	L 110–118				Richfield Coliseum	12–14
27	December 19, 1984	@ Philadelphia	L 118–123				The Spectrum	12–15
28	December 21, 1984	@ New Jersey	W 122–116				Brendan Byrne Arena	13–15
29	December 22, 1984	@ Milwaukee	L 90–101				MECCA Arena	13–16
30	December 26, 1984	@ Denver	L 119–130				McNichols Sports Arena	13–17
31	December 27, 1984	Portland	W 141–120				HemisFair Arena	14–17
32	December 29, 1984	Boston	L 112–120				HemisFair Arena	14–18

January: 8–5 (home: 6–2; road: 2–3)

Game	Date	Team	Score	High points	High rebounds	High assists	Location Attendance	Record
33	January 3, 1985	Dallas	W 116–115				HemisFair Arena	15–18
34	January 6, 1985; 9:30 p.m. CST	@ L.A. Lakers	L 98–99	Moore (27)	Gilmore, Iavaroni (8)	Moore (6)	The Forum; 13,513	15–19
35	January 8, 1985	Golden State	W 139–94				HemisFair Arena	16–19
36	January 11, 1985	Portland	L 103–123				HemisFair Arena	16–20
37	January 15, 1985	Utah	W 121–101				HemisFair Arena	17–20
38	January 17, 1985	@ Kansas City	W 117–113				Kemper Arena	18–20
39	January 19, 1985	Phoenix	W 106–100				HemisFair Arena	19–20
40	January 22, 1985	Kansas City	W 117–113				HemisFair Arena	20–20
41	January 23, 1985	@ Dallas	L 110–122				Reunion Arena	20–21
42	January 25, 1985	@ Houston	W 122–107				The Summit	21–21
43	January 27, 1985	Milwaukee	L 93–106				HemisFair Arena	21–22
44	January 29, 1985	New Jersey	W 130–127				HemisFair Arena	22–22
45	January 31, 1985	@ Seattle	L 94–96				Kingdome	22–23

February: 6–8 (home: 4–2; road: 2–6)

Game	Date	Team	Score	High points	High rebounds	High assists	Location Attendance	Record
46	February 1, 1985	@ Portland	W 104–93				Memorial Coliseum	23–23
47	February 2, 1985	@ Utah	L 104–105				Salt Palace Acord Arena	23–24
48	February 4, 1985	Golden State	W 114–109 (OT)				HemisFair Arena	24–24
49	February 5, 1985	@ Kansas City	L 116–135				Kemper Arena	24–25
50	February 7, 1985	L.A. Clippers	W 120–108				HemisFair Arena	25–25
All-Star Break
51	February 12, 1985	Kansas City	W 127–109				HemisFair Arena	26–25
52	February 14, 1985	Phoenix	W 131–102				HemisFair Arena	27–25
53	February 15, 1985	@ Denver	L 119–129				McNichols Sports Arena	27–26
54	February 18, 1985	@ L.A. Clippers	L 121–125				Los Angeles Memorial Sports Arena	27–27
55	February 20, 1985	Washington	L 104–105				HemisFair Arena	27–28
56	February 22, 1985	@ Phoenix	W 118–111				Arizona Veterans Memorial Coliseum	28–28
57	February 24, 1985	Portland	L 121–137				HemisFair Arena	28–29
58	February 26, 1985	@ New York	L 122–129				Madison Square Garden	28–30
59	February 27, 1985	@ Boston	L 102–111				Boston Garden	28–31

March: 10–7 (home: 6–2; road: 4–5)

Game	Date	Team	Score	High points	High rebounds	High assists	Location Attendance	Record
60	March 1, 1985	@ Detroit	W 108–98				Pontiac Silverdome	29–31
61	March 2, 1985	@ Atlanta	W 105–92				The Omni	30–31
62	March 4, 1985	Philadelphia	W 109–103				HemisFair Arena	31–31
63	March 6, 1985	Indiana	W 108–102				HemisFair Arena	32–31
64	March 7, 1985	@ Phoenix	L 117–119				Arizona Veterans Memorial Coliseum	32–32
65	March 9, 1985	Houston	L 117–123				HemisFair Arena	32–33
66	March 12, 1985	@ Golden State	L 122–145				Oakland-Alameda County Coliseum Arena	32–34
67	March 14, 1985	@ Seattle	W 100–93				Kingdome	33–34
68	March 15, 1985; 9:30 p.m. CST	@ L.A. Lakers	L 114–115	Gervin (37)	Banks (12)	Moore (11)	The Forum; 16,130	33–35
69	March 17, 1985	Denver	W 124–119				HemisFair Arena	34–35
70	March 19, 1985	@ Dallas	L 89–96				Reunion Arena	34–36
71	March 20, 1985	Chicago	W 106–98				HemisFair Arena	35–36
72	March 22, 1985	Dallas	L 114–123				HemisFair Arena	35–37
73	March 24, 1985	Seattle	W 104–99				HemisFair Arena	36–37
74	March 27, 1985	Golden State	W 121–120				HemisFair Arena	37–37
75	March 29, 1985	@ Utah	L 109–114				Salt Palace Acord Arena	37–38
76	March 31, 1985	@ L.A. Clippers	W 126–115				Los Angeles Memorial Sports Arena	38–38

April: 3–3 (home: 3–1; road: 0–2)

Game	Date	Team	Score	High points	High rebounds	High assists	Location Attendance	Record
77	April 3, 1985; 7:30 p.m. CST	L.A. Lakers	W 122–108	Mitchell (36)	Mitchell (14)	Moore (13)	HemisFair Arena; 11,627	39–38
78	April 5, 1985	@ Denver	L 109–118				McNichols Sports Arena	39–39
79	April 7, 1985	Houston	W 126–105				HemisFair Arena	40–39
80	April 9, 1985	@ Houston	L 103–124				The Summit	40–40
81	April 12, 1985	Kansas City	W 117–112				HemisFair Arena	41–40
82	April 14, 1985	Utah	L 102–104				HemisFair Arena	41–41

1984–85 schedule

=== Playoffs ===
1985 playoff game log
First Round: 2–3 (home: 1–1; road: 1–2)

Game	Date	Team	Score	High points	High rebounds	High assists	Location Attendance	Series
1	April 18, 1985	@ Denver	L 111–141	Mitchell (23)	Jones (8)	Moore (5)	McNichols Sports Arena; 12,128	0–1
2	April 20, 1985	@ Denver	W 113–111	Gervin (41)	Gilmore (12)	Moore (8)	McNichols Sports Arena; 17,022	1–1
3	April 23, 1985	Denver	L 112–115	Gervin (30)	Gilmore (14)	Moore (9)	HemisFair Arena; 8,799	1–2
4	April 26, 1985	Denver	W 116–111	Mitchell (37)	Gilmore (13)	Moore (16)	HemisFair Arena; 8,621	2–2
5	April 28, 1985	@ Denver	L 99–126	Gilmore (19)	Gilmore, Iavaroni (8)	Moore (4)	McNichols Sports Arena; 17,022	2–3

1985 schedule

== Player statistics ==
=== Ragular season ===
Player	POS	GP	GS	MP	REB	AST	STL	BLK	PTS	MPG	RPG	APG	SPG	BPG	PPG
Mike Mitchell	SF	82	82	2,853	417	151	61	27	1,824	34.8	5.1	1.8	.7	.3	22.2
Johnny Moore	PG	82	82	2,689	378	816	229	18	1,046	32.8	4.6	10.0	2.8	.2	12.8
Gene Banks	SF	82	41	2,091	445	234	65	13	778	25.5	5.4	2.9	.8	.2	9.5
Artis Gilmore	C	81	81	2,756	846	131	40	173	1,548	34.0	10.4	1.6	.5	2.1	19.1
Alvin Robertson	SG	79	9	1,685	265	275	127	24	726	21.3	3.4	3.5	1.6	.3	9.2
John Paxson	PG	78	1	1,259	68	215	45	3	486	16.1	.9	2.8	.6	.0	6.2
George Gervin	SG	72	69	2,091	234	178	66	48	1,524	29.0	3.3	2.5	.9	.7	21.2
Ozell Jones	C	67	6	888	238	56	30	57	245	13.3	3.6	.8	.4	.9	3.7
Marc Iavaroni^{†}	PF	57	33	1,178	275	113	31	32	381	20.7	4.8	2.0	.5	.6	6.7
Jeff Cook^{†}	PF	54	2	848	210	39	25	14	214	15.7	3.9	.7	.5	.3	4.0
Billy Knight^{†}	SF	52	1	611	96	59	14	1	311	11.8	1.8	1.1	.3	.0	6.0
Fred Roberts^{†}	PF	22	0	305	35	22	10	12	117	13.9	1.6	1.0	.5	.5	5.3
Edgar Jones^{†}	PF	18	1	322	62	18	9	18	129	17.9	3.4	1.0	.5	1.0	7.2
Mark McNamara^{†}	C	12	0	63	17	0	2	1	33	5.3	1.4	.0	.2	.1	2.8
Ron Brewer^{†}	SG	9	0	81	3	6	1	1	33	9.0	.3	.7	.1	.1	3.7
David Thirdkill^{†}	SF	2	2	52	7	3	2	1	15	26.0	3.5	1.5	1.0	.5	7.5
Linton Townes	SF	1	0	8	1	0	0	0	2	8.0	1.0	.0	.0	.0	2.0

- ^{†} Denotes player spent time with another team in the season. Stats reflect time with the Spurs only.

=== Playoffs ===
Player	POS	GP	GS	MP	REB	AST	STL	BLK	PTS	MPG	RPG	APG	SPG	BPG	PPG
Artis Gilmore	C	5	5	185	50	7	2	7	89	37.0	10.0	1.4	.4	1.4	17.8
George Gervin	SG	5	5	183	18	14	3	3	111	36.6	3.6	2.8	.6	.6	22.2
Mike Mitchell	SF	5	5	180	19	12	3	4	109	36.0	3.8	2.4	.6	.8	21.8
Johnny Moore	PG	5	5	168	30	42	10	2	66	33.6	6.0	8.4	2.0	.4	13.2
Marc Iavaroni	PF	5	5	116	26	13	5	2	45	23.2	5.2	2.6	1.0	.4	9.0
John Paxson	PG	5	0	114	5	21	5	0	51	22.8	1.0	4.2	1.0	.0	10.2
Jeff Cook	PF	5	0	98	29	4	5	6	35	19.6	5.8	.8	1.0	1.2	7.0
Ozell Jones	C	5	0	73	17	4	1	4	17	14.6	3.4	.8	.2	.8	3.4
Billy Knight	SF	5	0	45	6	3	2	0	16	9.0	1.2	.6	.4	.0	3.2
David Thirdkill	SF	5	0	22	2	2	0	0	4	4.4	.4	.4	.0	.0	.8
Linton Townes	SF	2	0	6	3	0	0	0	8	3.0	1.5	.0	.0	.0	4.0
Gene Banks	SF	1	0	10	0	1	0	0	0	10.0	.0	1.0	.0	.0	.0

== See also ==
- 1984-85 NBA season
