= 1984–85 Los Angeles Clippers season =

NBA professional basketball team season

- Head coach: Jim Lynam; Don Chaney
- General manager: Carl Scheer
- Owner: Donald Sterling
- Arena: Los Angeles Memorial Sports Arena

Results
- Record: 31–51 (.378)
- Place: Division: 5th (Pacific); Conference: 10th (Western)
- Playoff finish: Did not qualify
- Stats at Basketball Reference

Local media
- Television: KTTV (Al Albert, Ted Green, Eddie Doucette)
- Radio: KLAC (Eddie Doucette, Ted Green, Pete Arbogast)

The 1984–85 Los Angeles Clippers season was their 15th season in the NBA, their first season in the city of Los Angeles. Team owner and real estate mogul Donald Sterling, who for the past two seasons had been trying to move the team from San Diego, finally succeeded.

== Draft picks ==
Round	Pick	Player	Position	Nationality	College
1	8	Lancaster Gordon	G	United States	Louisville
1	14	Michael Cage	F	United States	San Diego State
4	75	Marc Glass	G	United States	Montana
5	98	Alonza Allen	F	United States	Louisiana-Lafayette
6	121	Phillip Haynes	G	United States	Memphis
7	144	David Brantley	F	United States	Oregon
8	167	Jim McLoughlin	G	United States	Temple
9	189	Dave Schultz	F	United States	Westmont College
10	211	Dick Mumma	C	United States	Penn State

== Roster ==
1984–85 Los Angeles Clippers roster
Players

Pos.	No.	Player	Height	Weight	DOB	From
G	2	Junior Bridgeman	6 ft 5 in (1.96 m)	215 lb (98 kg)		Louisville
F	7	Michael Brooks (injured) (IN)	6 ft 7 in (2.01 m)	220 lb (100 kg)		La Salle
F/C	44	Michael Cage	6 ft 9 in (2.06 m)	235 lb (107 kg)		San Diego State
F	42	Harvey Catchings	6 ft 9 in (2.06 m)	218 lb (99 kg)		Hardin–Simmons
C	40	James Donaldson	7 ft 2 in (2.18 m)	278 lb (126 kg)		Washington State
G	14	Franklin Edwards	6 ft 1 in (1.85 m)	190 lb (86 kg)		Cleveland State
C	36	Chris Engler	7 ft 0 in (2.13 m)	248 lb (112 kg)		Wyoming
G	4	Lancaster Gordon	6 ft 3 in (1.91 m)	195 lb (88 kg)		Louisville
F	8	Marques Johnson	6 ft 7 in (2.01 m)	224 lb (102 kg)		UCLA
F	46	Jay Murphy	6 ft 9 in (2.06 m)	220 lb (100 kg)		Boston College
G	10	Norm Nixon	6 ft 2 in (1.88 m)	170 lb (77 kg)		Duquesne
G	18	Derek Smith	6 ft 6 in (1.98 m)	218 lb (99 kg)		Louisville
C	32	Bill Walton	6 ft 11 in (2.11 m)	235 lb (107 kg)		UCLA
G	13	Bryan Warrick (waived)	6 ft 5 in (1.96 m)	195 lb (88 kg)		Saint Joseph's
F	22	Rory White	6 ft 8 in (2.03 m)	215 lb (98 kg)		South Alabama
F	38	Dale Wilkinson	6 ft 10 in (2.08 m)	220 lb (100 kg)		Idaho State

Coaches
Head coach
- Jim Lynam
Assistant(s)
- Brad Greenberg

Legend
- (DP) Unsigned draft pick
- (FA) Free agent
- (S) Suspended
- Injured

=== Roster Notes ===
- With the team moving from San Diego to Los Angeles, point guard Norm Nixon becomes the first former Laker to play with its crosstown rival, the new Los Angeles Clippers.

== Regular season ==
=== Season standings ===
Pacific Division	W	L	PCT	GB	Home	Road	Div
y-Los Angeles Lakers	62	20	.756	–	36–5	26–15	18–12
x-Portland Trail Blazers	42	40	.512	20	33–8	15–26	17–13
x-Phoenix Suns	36	46	.439	26	32–9	10–31	14–16
Seattle SuperSonics	31	51	.378	31	31–10	10–31	16–14
Los Angeles Clippers	31	51	.378	31	27–14	10–31	13–17
Golden State Warriors	22	60	.268	40	25–16	5–36	12–18

#	Western Conference				
#	Team	W	L	PCT	GB
1	c-Los Angeles Lakers	62	20	.756	–
2	y-Denver Nuggets	52	30	.634	10
3	x-Houston Rockets	48	34	.585	14
4	x-Dallas Mavericks	44	38	.537	18
5	x-Portland Trail Blazers	42	40	.512	20
6	x-Utah Jazz	41	41	.500	21
7	x-San Antonio Spurs	41	41	.500	21
8	x-Phoenix Suns	36	46	.439	26
9	Seattle SuperSonics	31	51	.378	31
10	Los Angeles Clippers	31	51	.378	31
11	Kansas City Kings	31	51	.378	31
12	Golden State Warriors	22	60	.268	40

z - clinched division title
y - clinched division title
x - clinched playoff spot

== Player statistics ==
Legend
GP	Games played	GS	Games started	MPG	Minutes per game
FG%	Field-goal percentage	3P%	3-point field-goal percentage	FT%	Free-throw percentage
RPG	Rebounds per game	APG	Assists per game	SPG	Steals per game
BPG	Blocks per game	PPG	Points per game

Player	GP	GS	MPG	FG%	3FG%	FT%	RPG	APG	SPG	BPG	PPG
Junior Bridgeman											
Michael Cage											
Harvey Catchings											
James Donaldson											
Franklin Edwards											
Lancaster Gordon											
Marques Johnson											
Jay Murphy											
Norm Nixon											
Derek Smith											
Bill Walton											
Bryan Warrick											
Rory White											
Dale Wilkinson											

== Awards, records and milestones ==
=== Awards ===
- Center James Donaldson led the league in field goal percentage this season at .637 - still one of the ten highest percentages in NBA history.

==== All-Star ====
- Norm Nixon selected as a reserve guard for the Western Conference All-Stars. This is his second All-Star Game appearance. This also makes Nixon the very first Los Angeles Clipper All-Star selection and the first franchise All-Star since World B. Free then with the San Diego Clippers was selected in 1980.

== Transactions ==
The Clippers were involved in the following transactions during the 1984–85 season.

=== Trades ===
June 19, 1984
To Los Angeles Clippers

- Draft rights to Jay Murphy
To Golden State Warriors

- Jerome Whitehead
August 29, 1984
To Los Angeles Clippers

- 1985 third-round draft pick
To Houston Rockets

- Hank McDowell
September 25, 1984
To Los Angeles Clippers

- Bryan Warrick
To Washington Bullets

- 1985 third-round draft pick
September 29, 1984
To Los Angeles Clippers

- Marques Johnson, Harvey Catchings, Junior Bridgeman and cash
To Milwaukee Bucks

- Terry Cummings, Craig Hodges and Ricky Pierce

=== Free agents ===
==== Additions ==== : Player / Signed / Former team	==== Subtractions ==== : Player / Left / New team
