= 1984–85 Portland Trail Blazers season =

NBA professional basketball team season

- Head coach: Jack Ramsay
- General manager: Stu Inman
- Owner: Larry Weinberg
- Arena: Memorial Coliseum

Results
- Record: 42–40 (.512)
- Place: Division: 2nd (Pacific); Conference: 5th (Western)
- Playoff finish: Conference semifinals (lost to Lakers 1–4)
- Stats at Basketball Reference

Local media
- Television: KOIN
- Radio: KEX

The 1984–85 Portland Trail Blazers season was the 15th season of the franchise in the National Basketball Association (NBA). The Trail Blazers lost in the second round to the eventual NBA champion Los Angeles Lakers.

== NBA draft ==
At the Felt Forum at Madison Square Garden, fans in attendance booed the Blazers selection of Sam Bowie. Part of the problem was that some had perceived Bowie as damaged goods. In September 1981, while at the University of Kentucky, Sam Bowie was diagnosed with having a fractured shin bone in his left leg. This was previously misdiagnosed as a shin splint. Bowie would not play for Kentucky until the 1983–84 season. Prior to the diagnosis, Bowie averaged 17.1 points per game and 9.1 rebounds per game in 1980–81. At that time there were serious discussions about Bowie entering the 1981 NBA Draft. Bowie was so highly thought of, that he was named to the 1980 US Olympic Basketball Team. When Bowie returned from his injury in 1983, he would average 10.5 points per game and 9.2 rebounds per game. The Blazers general manager Stu Inman had made it known that if Sam Bowie passed the Blazers physical examination, he would be drafted by the Blazers. The Blazers had given Bowie a seven-hour physical to ensure that his leg had recovered from the two-year layoff between 1981 and 1983. The Blazers criteria in selecting Bowie over Jordan was that the Blazers backcourt already had Clyde Drexler and Jim Paxson. The Blazers felt that they had lacked a true center since Bill Walton left the club, and the hope was that Bowie would be able to fill this role.

Note: This is not a complete list; only the first two rounds are covered, as well as any other picks by the franchise who played at least one NBA game.

| Round | Pick | Player | Position | Nationality | School/Club team |
|---|---|---|---|---|---|
| 1 | 2 | Sam Bowie | F/C | United States | Kentucky |
| 1 | 19 | Bernard Thompson | G/F | United States | Fresno State |
| 2 | 26 | Victor Fleming | G | United States | Xavier |
| 2 | 33 | Steve Colter | G | United States | New Mexico |
| 2 | 46 | Jerome Kersey | F | United States | Longwood |

== Roster ==
Portland Trail Blazers roster
Players

| Pos. | No. | Player | Height | Weight | DOB | From |
|---|---|---|---|---|---|---|
| C | 30 | Sam Bowie | 7 ft 1 in (2.16 m) | 235 lb (107 kg) | | Kentucky |
| F | 34 | Kenny Carr | 6 ft 7 in (2.01 m) | 220 lb (100 kg) | | NC State |
| G | 20 | Steve Colter | 6 ft 3 in (1.91 m) | 165 lb (75 kg) | | New Mexico State |
| G | 22 | Clyde Drexler | 6 ft 7 in (2.01 m) | 210 lb (95 kg) | | Houston |
| F | 25 | Jerome Kersey | 6 ft 7 in (2.01 m) | 215 lb (98 kg) | | Longwood |
| C | 24 | Audie Norris | 6 ft 9 in (2.06 m) | 230 lb (104 kg) | | Jackson State |
| G | 4 | Jim Paxson | 6 ft 6 in (1.98 m) | 200 lb (91 kg) | | Dayton |
| C | 50 | Tom Scheffler | 6 ft 11 in (2.11 m) | 240 lb (109 kg) | | Purdue |
| G/F | 5 | Bernard Thompson | 6 ft 6 in (1.98 m) | 210 lb (95 kg) | | Fresno State |
| F/C | 43 | Mychal Thompson | 6 ft 10 in (2.08 m) | 226 lb (103 kg) | | Minnesota |
| G | 14 | Darnell Valentine | 6 ft 1 in (1.85 m) | 183 lb (83 kg) | | Kansas |
| F | 55 | Kiki Vandeweghe | 6 ft 8 in (2.03 m) | 220 lb (100 kg) | | UCLA |

Coaches
Head coach
- Jack Ramsay (Saint Joseph's)
Assistant(s)
- Rick Adelman (Loyola Marymount)
- Bucky Buckwalter (Utah)

Legend
- (DP) Unsigned draft pick
- (FA) Free agent
- (S) Suspended
- Injured

== Regular season ==
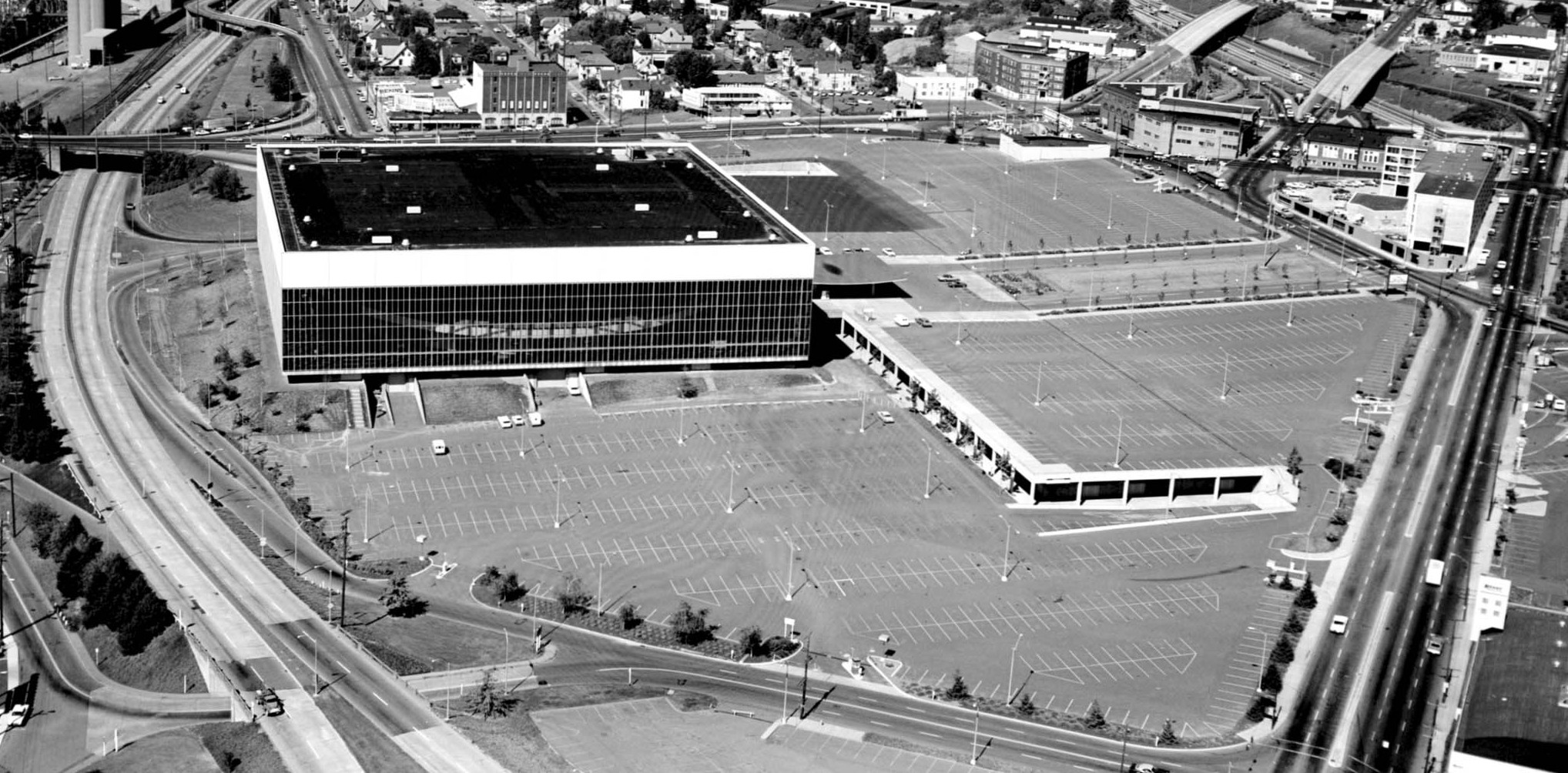
The Trail Blazers played their home games at Veterans Memorial Coliseum.

=== Season standings ===
| Pacific Division | W | L | PCT | GB | Home | Road | Div |
|---|---|---|---|---|---|---|---|
| y-Los Angeles Lakers | 62 | 20 | .756 | – | 36–5 | 26–15 | 18–12 |
| x-Portland Trail Blazers | 42 | 40 | .512 | 20 | 33–8 | 15–26 | 17–13 |
| x-Phoenix Suns | 36 | 46 | .439 | 26 | 32–9 | 10–31 | 14–16 |
| Seattle SuperSonics | 31 | 51 | .378 | 31 | 31–10 | 10–31 | 16–14 |
| Los Angeles Clippers | 31 | 51 | .378 | 31 | 27–14 | 10–31 | 13–17 |
| Golden State Warriors | 22 | 60 | .268 | 40 | 25–16 | 5–36 | 12–18 |

| # | Western Conference | | | | |
| # | Team | W | L | PCT | GB |
|---|---|---|---|---|---|
| 1 | c-Los Angeles Lakers | 62 | 20 | .756 | – |
| 2 | y-Denver Nuggets | 52 | 30 | .634 | 10 |
| 3 | x-Houston Rockets | 48 | 34 | .585 | 14 |
| 4 | x-Dallas Mavericks | 44 | 38 | .537 | 18 |
| 5 | x-Portland Trail Blazers | 42 | 40 | .512 | 20 |
| 6 | x-Utah Jazz | 41 | 41 | .500 | 21 |
| 7 | x-San Antonio Spurs | 41 | 41 | .500 | 21 |
| 8 | x-Phoenix Suns | 36 | 46 | .439 | 26 |
| 9 | Seattle SuperSonics | 31 | 51 | .378 | 31 |
| 10 | Los Angeles Clippers | 31 | 51 | .378 | 31 |
| 11 | Kansas City Kings | 31 | 51 | .378 | 31 |
| 12 | Golden State Warriors | 22 | 60 | .268 | 40 |

Notes

- z, y – division champions
- x – clinched playoff spot

== Game log ==
=== Regular season ===
1984–85 game log
Total: 42–40 (home: 30–11; road: 12–29)
October: 2–0 (home: 1–0; road: 1–0)

| Game | Date | Team | Score | High points | High rebounds | High assists | Location Attendance | Record |
|---|---|---|---|---|---|---|---|---|
| 1 | October 27, 1984 | @ Kansas City | W 140–119 | | | | Kemper Arena | 1–0 |
| 2 | October 30, 1984 | Seattle | W 115–83 | | | | Memorial Coliseum | 2–0 |

November: 8–8 (home: 6–2; road: 2–6)

| Game | Date | Team | Score | High points | High rebounds | High assists | Location Attendance | Record |
|---|---|---|---|---|---|---|---|---|
| 3 | November 1, 1984 | @ Phoenix | L 130–139 (3OT) | | | | Arizona Veterans Memorial Coliseum | 2–1 |
| 4 | November 3, 1984 | @ L.A. Clippers | W 131–112 | | | | Los Angeles Memorial Sports Arena | 3–1 |
| 5 | November 4, 1984; 7:30 p.m. PST | @ L.A. Lakers | L 116–124 | Drexler (23) | Drexler, Thompson (8) | Paxson, Valentine (8) | The Forum; 14,148 | 3–2 |
| 6 | November 6, 1984 | Phoenix | W 116–99 | | | | Memorial Coliseum | 4–2 |
| 7 | November 8, 1984 | @ Denver | L 125–128 | | | | McNichols Sports Arena | 4–3 |
| 8 | November 9, 1984; 7:30 p.m. PST | L.A. Lakers | L 126–130 | Thompson (28) | Drexler (7) | Valentine (11) | Memorial Coliseum; 12,666 | 4–4 |
| 9 | November 11, 1984 | Golden State | W 109–97 | | | | Memorial Coliseum | 5–4 |
| 10 | November 13, 1984 | Dallas | L 94–101 | | | | Memorial Coliseum | 5–5 |
| 11 | November 15, 1984 | Utah | W 129–120 | | | | Memorial Coliseum | 6–5 |
| 12 | November 16, 1984 | @ Seattle | L 89–91 | | | | Kingdome | 6–6 |
| 13 | November 18, 1984 | L.A. Clippers | W 113–105 | | | | Memorial Coliseum | 7–6 |
| 14 | November 20, 1984 | New Jersey | W 117–107 (OT) | | | | Memorial Coliseum | 8–6 |
| 15 | November 24, 1984 | Chicago | W 141–131 | | | | Memorial Coliseum | 9–6 |
| 16 | November 27, 1984 | @ Cleveland | W 115–106 | | | | Richfield Coliseum | 10–6 |
| 17 | November 28, 1984 | @ Detroit | L 113–120 | | | | Pontiac Silverdome | 10–7 |
| 18 | November 30, 1984 | @ Philadelphia | L 116–126 | | | | The Spectrum | 10–8 |

December: 4–9 (home: 3–2; road: 1–7)

| Game | Date | Team | Score | High points | High rebounds | High assists | Location Attendance | Record |
|---|---|---|---|---|---|---|---|---|
| 19 | December 1, 1984 | @ New York | W 115–93 | | | | Madison Square Garden | 11–8 |
| 20 | December 4, 1984 | Phoenix | W 112–104 | | | | Memorial Coliseum | 12–8 |
| 21 | December 6, 1984 | San Antonio | W 113–96 | | | | Memorial Coliseum | 13–8 |
| 22 | December 8, 1984 | Houston | L 120–127 | | | | Memorial Coliseum | 13–9 |
| 23 | December 11, 1984 | @ Denver | L 122–123 | | | | McNichols Sports Arena | 13–10 |
| 24 | December 13, 1984 | @ L.A. Clippers | L 100–106 | | | | Los Angeles Memorial Sports Arena | 13–11 |
| 25 | December 14, 1984 | @ Golden State | L 92–105 | | | | Oakland-Alameda County Coliseum Arena | 13–12 |
| 26 | December 18, 1984 | @ Seattle | L 99–109 | | | | Kingdome | 13–13 |
| 27 | December 20, 1984 | Kansas City | L 113–118 | | | | Memorial Coliseum | 13–14 |
| 28 | December 22, 1984 | @ Phoenix | L 108–110 | | | | Arizona Veterans Memorial Coliseum | 13–15 |
| 29 | December 25, 1984 | Golden State | W 106–97 | | | | Memorial Coliseum | 14–15 |
| 30 | December 27, 1984 | @ San Antonio | L 120–141 | | | | HemisFair Arena | 14–16 |
| 31 | December 29, 1984 | @ Houston | L 92–108 | | | | The Summit | 14–17 |

January: 6–9 (home: 3–4; road: 3–5)

| Game | Date | Team | Score | High points | High rebounds | High assists | Location Attendance | Record |
|---|---|---|---|---|---|---|---|---|
| 32 | January 1, 1985 | Philadelphia | L 106–111 | | | | Memorial Coliseum | 14–18 |
| 33 | January 3, 1985 | Seattle | W 123–89 | | | | Memorial Coliseum | 15–18 |
| 34 | January 4, 1985; 7:30 p.m. PST | @ L.A. Lakers | L 95–120 | Drexler (19) | Bowie (10) | Valentine (6) | The Forum; 13,513 | 15–19 |
| 35 | January 6, 1985 | Indiana | W 118–101 | | | | Memorial Coliseum | 16–19 |
| 36 | January 8, 1985 | Dallas | L 102–108 | | | | Memorial Coliseum | 16–20 |
| 37 | January 11, 1985 | @ San Antonio | W 123–103 | | | | HemisFair Arena | 17–20 |
| 38 | January 13, 1985 | @ Dallas | L 101–124 | | | | Reunion Arena | 17–21 |
| 39 | January 15, 1985 | Houston | W 121–117 | | | | Memorial Coliseum | 18–21 |
| 40 | January 18, 1985 | @ Utah | L 122–127 | | | | Salt Palace Acord Arena | 18–22 |
| 41 | January 19, 1985 | Denver | L 120–123 | | | | Memorial Coliseum | 18–23 |
| 42 | January 22, 1985 | @ Chicago | L 115–123 | | | | Chicago Stadium | 18–24 |
| 43 | January 23, 1985 | @ Indiana | W 136–104 | | | | Market Square Arena | 19–24 |
| 44 | January 27, 1985 | @ Boston | L 127–128 | | | | Boston Garden | 19–25 |
| 45 | January 29, 1985; 7:30 p.m. PST | L.A. Lakers | L 106–122 | Thompson (24) | Bowie (13) | Drexler, Valentine (7) | Memorial Coliseum; 12,666 | 19–26 |
| 46 | January 31, 1985 | @ Golden State | W 129–109 | | | | Oakland-Alameda County Coliseum Arena | 20–26 |

February: 7–6 (home: 6–2; road: 1–4)

| Game | Date | Team | Score | High points | High rebounds | High assists | Location Attendance | Record |
|---|---|---|---|---|---|---|---|---|
| 47 | February 1, 1985 | San Antonio | L 93–104 | | | | Memorial Coliseum | 20–27 |
| 48 | February 2, 1985 | Milwaukee | L 95–105 | | | | Memorial Coliseum | 20–28 |
| 49 | February 5, 1985 | Utah | W 126–106 | | | | Memorial Coliseum | 21–28 |
| 50 | February 7, 1985 | New York | W 133–122 | | | | Memorial Coliseum | 22–28 |
All-Star Break
| 51 | February 12, 1985 | Boston | W 111–103 | | | | Memorial Coliseum | 23–28 |
| 52 | February 15, 1985 | Washington | W 93–89 | | | | Memorial Coliseum | 24–28 |
| 53 | February 17, 1985 | Kansas City | W 115–96 | | | | Memorial Coliseum | 25–28 |
| 54 | February 19, 1985 | @ Kansas City | L 96–116 | | | | Kemper Arena | 25–29 |
| 55 | February 20, 1985 | @ Dallas | L 98–104 | | | | Reunion Arena | 25–30 |
| 56 | February 22, 1985 | @ Houston | L 103–117 | | | | The Summit | 25–31 |
| 57 | February 24, 1985 | @ San Antonio | W 137–121 | | | | HemisFair Arena | 26–31 |
| 58 | February 26, 1985 | L.A. Clippers | W 110–99 | | | | Memorial Coliseum | 27–31 |
| 59 | February 28, 1985 | @ Golden State | L 120–124 | | | | Oakland-Alameda County Coliseum Arena | 27–32 |

March: 10–6 (home: 6–1; road: 4–5)

| Game | Date | Team | Score | High points | High rebounds | High assists | Location Attendance | Record |
|---|---|---|---|---|---|---|---|---|
| 60 | March 1, 1985 | Cleveland | L 103–111 | | | | Memorial Coliseum | 27–33 |
| 61 | March 3, 1985 | Utah | W 121–93 | | | | Memorial Coliseum | 28–33 |
| 62 | March 5, 1985 | @ Atlanta (at New Orleans, LA) | W 100–91 | | | | Lakefront Arena | 29–33 |
| 63 | March 6, 1985 | @ Washington | L 121–127 (2OT) | | | | Capital Centre | 29–34 |
| 64 | March 8, 1985 | @ New Jersey | W 128–110 | | | | Brendan Byrne Arena | 30–34 |
| 65 | March 10, 1985 | @ Milwaukee | L 94–110 | | | | MECCA Arena | 30–35 |
| 66 | March 12, 1985 | @ Kansas City | L 114–120 | | | | Kemper Arena | 30–36 |
| 67 | March 15, 1985 | Golden State | W 126–101 | | | | Memorial Coliseum | 31–36 |
| 68 | March 17, 1985 | Atlanta | W 114–101 | | | | Memorial Coliseum | 32–36 |
| 69 | March 19, 1985 | Detroit | W 143–123 | | | | Memorial Coliseum | 33–36 |
| 70 | March 21, 1985 | @ Phoenix | L 104–114 | | | | Arizona Veterans Memorial Coliseum | 33–37 |
| 71 | March 23, 1985 | L.A. Clippers | W 126–123 | | | | Memorial Coliseum | 34–37 |
| 72 | March 25, 1985 | @ L.A. Clippers | W 120–99 | | | | Los Angeles Memorial Sports Arena | 35–37 |
| 73 | March 26, 1985; 7:30 p.m. PST | L.A. Lakers | W 116–113 (OT) | VanDeWeghe (21) | Thompson (9) | Drexler (9) | Memorial Coliseum; 12,666 | 36–37 |
| 74 | March 29, 1985 | @ Seattle | W 125–99 | | | | Kingdome | 37–37 |
| 75 | March 30, 1985 | @ Denver | L 117–129 | | | | McNichols Sports Arena | 37–38 |

April: 5–2 (home: 5–0; road: 0–2)

| Game | Date | Team | Score | High points | High rebounds | High assists | Location Attendance | Record |
|---|---|---|---|---|---|---|---|---|
| 76 | April 2, 1985 | Houston | W 127–113 | | | | Memorial Coliseum | 38–38 |
| 77 | April 5, 1985 | Seattle | W 145–120 | | | | Memorial Coliseum | 39–38 |
| 78 | April 7, 1985; 12:30 p.m. PST | @ L.A. Lakers | L 116–124 | VanDeWeghe (24) | Bowie (20) | Drexler (13) | The Forum; 13,186 | 39–39 |
| 79 | April 9, 1985 | Phoenix | W 116–100 | | | | Memorial Coliseum | 40–39 |
| 80 | April 11, 1985 | @ Utah | L 107–145 | | | | Salt Palace Acord Arena | 40–40 |
| 81 | April 12, 1985 | Dallas | W 131–111 | | | | Memorial Coliseum | 41–40 |
| 82 | April 14, 1985 | Denver | W 117–112 | | | | Memorial Coliseum | 42–40 |

1984–85 schedule

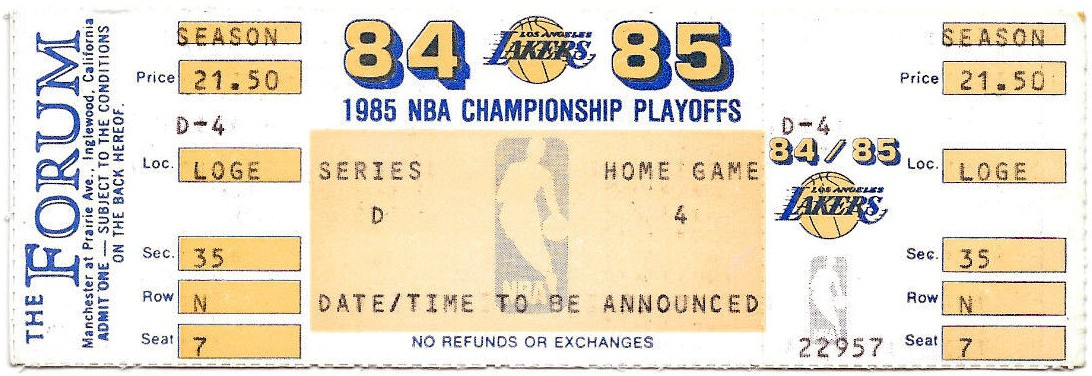
A ticket for Game 2 of the Western Conference Semi-finals between the Trail Blazers and the Lakers.

== Playoffs ==
1985 playoff game log
First round: 3–1 (home: 2–0; road: 1–1)

| Game | Date | Team | Score | High points | High rebounds | High assists | Location Attendance | Series |
|---|---|---|---|---|---|---|---|---|
| 1 | April 18, 1985 | @ Dallas | L 131–139 (2OT) | VanDeWeghe (25) | Bowie (14) | Valentine (13) | Reunion Arena; 17,007 | 0–1 |
| 2 | April 20, 1985 | @ Dallas | W 124–121 (OT) | VanDeWeghe (27) | Bowie (20) | Drexler (12) | Reunion Arena; 17,007 | 1–1 |
| 3 | April 23, 1985 | Dallas | W 122–109 | VanDeWeghe (24) | Bowie (11) | Drexler (10) | Memorial Coliseum; 12,666 | 2–1 |
| 4 | April 25, 1985 | Dallas | W 115–113 | VanDeWeghe (27) | Carr (10) | Valentine (9) | Memorial Coliseum; 12,666 | 3–1 |

Conference Semi-finals: 1–4 (home: 1–1; road: 0–3)

| Game | Date | Team | Score | High points | High rebounds | High assists | Location Attendance | Series |
|---|---|---|---|---|---|---|---|---|
| 1 | April 27, 1985; 12:30 p.m. PST | @ L.A. Lakers | L 101–125 | Colter (26) | Carr (10) | Colter (8) | The Forum; 17,505 | 0–1 |
| 2 | April 30, 1985; 7:30 p.m. PDT | @ L.A. Lakers | L 118–134 | VanDeWeghe (23) | Carr (12) | Valentine (9) | The Forum; 17,505 | 0–2 |
| 3 | May 3, 1985; 7:30 p.m. PDT | L.A. Lakers | L 126–130 | VanDeWeghe (27) | Drexler (11) | Drexler (14) | Memorial Coliseum; 12,666 | 0–3 |
| 4 | May 5, 1985; 12:30 p.m. PDT | L.A. Lakers | W 115–107 | VanDeWeghe, Thompson (17) | Thompson (10) | Drexler (10) | Memorial Coliseum; 12,666 | 1–3 |
| 5 | May 7, 1985; 7:30 p.m. PDT | @ L.A. Lakers | L 120–139 | Kersey (18) | Carr (11) | Drexler (12) | The Forum; 17,505 | 1–4 |

1985 schedule
