= Lancaster Gordon =

American basketball player (born 1962)

Personal information
- Born: June 24, 1962 (age 64) Jackson, Mississippi, U.S.
- Listed height: 6 ft 3 in (1.91 m)
- Listed weight: 185 lb (84 kg)

Career information
- High school: Jim Hill (Jackson, Mississippi)
- College: Louisville (1980–1984)
- NBA draft: 1984: 1st round, 8th overall pick
- Drafted by: Los Angeles Clippers
- Playing career: 1984–1991
- Position: Point guard / shooting guard
- Number: 4

Career history
- 1984–1988: Los Angeles Clippers
- 1988–1989: Pensacola Tornados
- 1989–1990: La Crosse Catbirds
- 1990–1991: Sioux Falls Skyforce

Career highlights
- CBA champion (1990)
- Stats at NBA.com
- Stats at Basketball Reference

Lancaster Gordon (born June 24, 1962) is an American former professional basketball player who was selected by the Los Angeles Clippers in the first round (8th pick overall) of the 1984 NBA draft. A 6'3" guard from the University of Louisville, Gordon was selected as the Most Valuable Player in the 1983 NCAA Mideast Regional, and went on to play four NBA seasons for the Clippers from 1984 to 1988. In his career, Gordon played in 201 games and scored a total of 1,125 points. Gordon also played parts of three seasons in the Continental Basketball Association from 1988 to 1991. He averaged 8.2 points per game in 39 games for the Pensacola Tornados, La Crosse Catbirds and Sioux Falls Skyforce. He won a CBA championship with the Catbirds in 1990.

Gordon is a member of the University of Louisville Athletics Hall of Fame.

== NBA career statistics ==
Legend
GP	Games played	GS	Games started	MPG	Minutes per game
FG%	Field goal percentage	3P%	3-point field goal percentage	FT%	Free throw percentage
RPG	Rebounds per game	APG	Assists per game	SPG	Steals per game
BPG	Blocks per game	PPG	Points per game	**Bold**	Career high

=== Regular season ===
Year	Team	GP	GS	MPG	FG%	3P%	FT%	RPG	APG	SPG	BPG	PPG
1984–85	L.A. Clippers	63	1	10.8	.383	.222	.755	1.0	1.4	.5	.1	4.1
1985–86	L.A. Clippers	60	1	11.7	.377	.250	.804	1.1	1.0	.6	.2	5.2
1986–87	L.A. Clippers	**70**	**4**	**16.1**	**.406**	**.292**	.737	**1.8**	**2.0**	**.9**	.2	**7.5**
1987–88	L.A. Clippers	8	0	8.1	.355	.000	**1.000**	0.5	0.9	.1	**.3**	3.5
Career		201	6	12.8	.391	.271	.767	1.3	1.5	0.6	0.2	5.6
