= 1984–85 Denver Nuggets season =

NBA professional basketball team season

- Division champions
- Head coach: Doug Moe
- Arena: McNichols Sports Arena

Results
- Record: 52–30 (.634)
- Place: Division: 1st (Midwest); Conference: 2nd (Western)
- Playoff finish: West Finals (lost to Lakers 1–4)
- Stats at Basketball Reference

Local media
- Television: KWGN
- Radio: KOA

The 1984–85 Denver Nuggets season was their 18th season, and their ninth in the NBA.

In the playoffs, the Nuggets defeated the San Antonio Spurs in five games in the First Round, then defeated the Utah Jazz in five games in the Semi-finals, before losing to the eventual NBA champion Los Angeles Lakers in five games in the conference finals.

== Draft picks ==
Round	Pick	Player	Position	Nationality	School/Club team
2	42	Willie White	G	United States	Tennessee-Chattanooga
4	79	Karl Tilleman		Canada	Calgary
5	103	Prince Bridges		United States	Missouri
6	125	Willie Burton		United States	Tennessee
7	149	Mark Simpson		United States	Catawba College
8	171	Bill Wendlandt		United States	Texas
9	194	Cecil Exum	F	United States; Australia	North Carolina
10	215	Dexter Bailey		United States	Xavier (OH)

== Roster ==
1984–85 Denver Nuggets roster
Players

Pos.	No.	Player	Height	Weight	DOB	From
C	42	Wayne Cooper	6 ft 10 in (2.08 m)	195 lb (88 kg)		New Orleans
SG	23	T.R. Dunn	6 ft 4 in (1.93 m)	192 lb (87 kg)		Alabama
SF	2	Alex English	6 ft 7 in (2.01 m)	190 lb (86 kg)		South Carolina
G	5	Mike Evans	6 ft 1 in (1.85 m)	170 lb (77 kg)		Kansas State
F	24	Bill Hanzlik	6 ft 7 in (2.01 m)	185 lb (84 kg)		Notre Dame
C	44	Dan Issel	6 ft 9 in (2.06 m)	235 lb (107 kg)		Kentucky
PF	35	Joe Kopicki	6 ft 9 in (2.06 m)	240 lb (109 kg)		Detroit Mercy
G	12	Fat Lever	6 ft 3 in (1.91 m)	170 lb (77 kg)		Arizona State
F	33	Calvin Natt	6 ft 6 in (1.98 m)	220 lb (100 kg)		Louisiana–Monroe
C	34	Danny Schayes	6 ft 11 in (2.11 m)	235 lb (107 kg)		Syracuse
G/F	20	Elston Turner	6 ft 5 in (1.96 m)	190 lb (86 kg)		Mississippi
SG	10	Willie White	6 ft 3 in (1.91 m)	195 lb (88 kg)		Chattanooga

Coaches
Head coach
- (United States) Doug Moe

Legend
- (DP) Unsigned draft pick
- (FA) Free agent
- (S) Suspended
- Injured

== Regular season ==
=== Season standings ===
Midwest Division	W	L	PCT	GB	Home	Road	Div
y-Denver Nuggets	52	30	.634	–	34–7	18–23	17–13
x-Houston Rockets	48	34	.585	4	29–12	19–22	20–10
x-Dallas Mavericks	44	38	.537	8	24–17	20–21	14–16
x-Utah Jazz	41	41	.500	11	26–15	15–26	19–11
x-San Antonio Spurs	41	41	.500	11	30–11	11–30	12–18
Kansas City Kings	31	51	.378	21	23–18	8–33	8–22

#	Western Conference				
#	Team	W	L	PCT	GB
1	c-Los Angeles Lakers	62	20	.756	–
2	y-Denver Nuggets	52	30	.634	10
3	x-Houston Rockets	48	34	.585	14
4	x-Dallas Mavericks	44	38	.537	18
5	x-Portland Trail Blazers	42	40	.512	20
6	x-Utah Jazz	41	41	.500	21
7	x-San Antonio Spurs	41	41	.500	21
8	x-Phoenix Suns	36	46	.439	26
9	Seattle SuperSonics	31	51	.378	31
10	Los Angeles Clippers	31	51	.378	31
11	Kansas City Kings	31	51	.378	31
12	Golden State Warriors	22	60	.268	40

Notes

- z, y – division champions
- x – clinched playoff spot

== Game log ==
=== Regular season ===
1984–85 game log
Total: 52–30 (home: 34–7; road: 18–23)
October: 1–1 (home: 1–0; road: 0–1)

Game	Date	Team	Score	High points	High rebounds	High assists	Location Attendance	Record
1	October 27	Golden State	W 125–121				McNichols Sports Arena	1–0
2	October 30	@ San Antonio	L 118–126				HemisFair Arena	1–1

November: 11–2 (home: 7–0; road: 4–2)

Game	Date	Team	Score	High points	High rebounds	High assists	Location Attendance	Record
3	November 1	Chicago	W 129–113				McNichols Sports Arena	2–1
4	November 3	@ Kansas City	W 128–114				Kemper Arena	3–1
5	November 5	@ L.A. Clippers	L 104–107				Los Angeles Memorial Sports Arena	3–2
6	November 6; 8:30 p.m. MST	@ L.A. Lakers	W 146–130	English (28)	Natt (8)	Lever (18)	The Forum; 11,272	4–2
7	November 8	Portland	W 128–125				McNichols Sports Arena	5–2
8	November 10	Utah	W 147–135				McNichols Sports Arena	6–2
9	November 13	Phoenix	W 122–110				McNichols Sports Arena	7–2
10	November 16	Houston	W 119–102				McNichols Sports Arena	8–2
11	November 20	@ Seattle	W 124–114				Kingdome	9–2
12	November 21	@ L.A. Clippers	W 112–106				Los Angeles Memorial Sports Arena	10–2
13	November 24	Philadelphia	W 114–110				McNichols Sports Arena	11–2
14	November 27	L.A. Clippers	W 139–110				McNichols Sports Arena	12–2
15	November 30	@ Utah	L 97–116				Salt Palace Acord Arena	12–3

December: 7–9 (home: 4–4; road: 3–5)

Game	Date	Team	Score	High points	High rebounds	High assists	Location Attendance	Record
16	December 1	Utah	W 118–111				McNichols Sports Arena	13–3
17	December 4	@ New York	L 98–100				Madison Square Garden	13–4
18	December 5	@ Boston	L 107–123				Boston Garden	13–5
19	December 7	@ Detroit	L 115–122				Pontiac Silverdome	13–6
20	December 8	@ Cleveland	W 114–108				Richfield Coliseum	14–6
21	December 11	Portland	W 123–122				McNichols Sports Arena	15–6
22	December 12	@ San Antonio	L 105–126				HemisFair Arena	15–7
23	December 14	Kansas City	L 117–123				McNichols Sports Arena	15–8
24	December 16	Seattle	L 101–112				McNichols Sports Arena	15–9
25	December 18	@ Golden State	W 126–122 (OT)				Oakland–Alameda County Coliseum Arena	16–9
26	December 19	Detroit	L 129–148				McNichols Sports Arena	16–10
27	December 21	Dallas	W 116–93				McNichols Sports Arena	17–10
28	December 22	@ Houston	L 107–125				The Summit	17–11
29	December 26	San Antonio	W 130–119				McNichols Sports Arena	18–11
30	December 28; 7:30 p.m. MST	L.A. Lakers	L 123–135	English (31)	English (9)	English (8)	McNichols Sports Arena	18–12
31	December 29	@ Seattle (at Tacoma, Washington)	W 115–108				Tacoma Dome	19–12

January: 11–5 (home: 8–2; road: 3–3)

Game	Date	Team	Score	High points	High rebounds	High assists	Location Attendance	Record
32	January 2	Houston	L 111–113				McNichols Sports Arena	19–13
33	January 4	@ Utah	L 108–118				Salt Palace Acord Arena	19–14
34	January 5	L.A. Clippers	L 115–127				McNichols Sports Arena	19–15
35	January 8; 8:30 p.m. MST	@ L.A. Lakers	W 126–124	English (41)	English (11)	Evans (9)	The Forum; 13,024	20–15
36	January 9	New York	W 100–95				McNichols Sports Arena	21–15
37	January 11	Kansas City	W 143–121				McNichols Sports Arena	22–15
38	January 13	@ Milwaukee	L 116–140				MECCA Arena	22–16
39	January 14	@ Chicago	L 113–122				Chicago Stadium	22–17
40	January 16	Golden State	W 115–107				McNichols Sports Arena	23–17
41	January 18	Washington	W 108–106				McNichols Sports Arena	24–17
42	January 19	@ Portland	W 123–120				Memorial Coliseum	25–17
43	January 24	New Jersey	W 119–110				McNichols Sports Arena	26–17
44	January 26	Cleveland	W 144–127				McNichols Sports Arena	27–17
45	January 28	@ Utah	W 104–100				Salt Palace Acord Arena	28–17
46	January 29	Phoenix	W 128–100				McNichols Sports Arena	29–17
47	January 31	Dallas	W 121–110				McNichols Sports Arena	30–17

February: 8–4 (home: 5–0; road: 3–4)

Game	Date	Team	Score	High points	High rebounds	High assists	Location Attendance	Record
48	February 2	@ Houston	L 128–131 (2OT)				The Summit	30–18
49	February 3	@ Dallas	L 106–114				Reunion Arena	30–19
50	February 5	@ Phoenix	L 103–108				Arizona Veterans Memorial Coliseum	30–20
51	February 6	Seattle	W 120–101				McNichols Sports Arena	31–20
All-Star Break
52	February 12	Atlanta	W 131–107				McNichols Sports Arena	32–20
53	February 14	@ Kansas City	W 138–123				Kemper Arena	33–20
54	February 15	San Antonio	W 129–119				McNichols Sports Arena	34–20
55	February 20	Boston	W 132–129				McNichols Sports Arena	35–20
56	February 22	@ Seattle	L 123–133				Kingdome	35–21
57	February 24	Phoenix	W 117–107				McNichols Sports Arena	36–21
58	February 26	@ Atlanta	W 106–94				The Omni	37–21
59	February 27	@ Washington	W 124–111				Capital Centre	38–21

March: 9–5 (home: 7–0; road: 2–5)

Game	Date	Team	Score	High points	High rebounds	High assists	Location Attendance	Record
60	March 1	@ Dallas	W 141–140 (OT)				Reunion Arena	39–21
61	March 2	Milwaukee	W 123–122				McNichols Sports Arena	40–21
62	March 5	Houston	W 133–131 (2OT)				McNichols Sports Arena	41–21
63	March 7	@ Kansas City	L 140–142				Kemper Arena	41–22
64	March 9	Indiana	W 126–116				McNichols Sports Arena	42–22
65	March 12	@ Houston	L 129–131				The Summit	42–23
66	March 15	@ Dallas	L 108–127				Reunion Arena	42–24
67	March 17	@ San Antonio	L 119–124				HemisFair Arena	42–25
68	March 18	Dallas	W 113–111				McNichols Sports Arena	43–25
69	March 20	@ Indiana	W 123–119				Market Square Arena	44–25
70	March 22	@ New Jersey	W 123–111				Brendan Byrne Arena	45–25
71	March 24	@ Philadelphia	L 103–124				The Spectrum	45–26
72	March 26	Utah	W 104–89				McNichols Sports Arena	46–26
73	March 28	Kansas City	W 133–115				McNichols Sports Arena	47–26
74	March 30	Portland	W 129–117				McNichols Sports Arena	48–26

April: 4–4 (home: 2–1; road: 2–3)

Game	Date	Team	Score	High points	High rebounds	High assists	Location Attendance	Record
75	April 2; 7:30 p.m. MST	L.A. Lakers	L 104–118	English (31)	English (12)	Evans (5)	McNichols Sports Arena; 17,022	48–27
76	April 4	@ Phoenix	W 110–103				Arizona Veterans Memorial Coliseum	49–27
77	April 5	San Antonio	W 118–109				McNichols Sports Arena	50–27
78	April 7	Golden State	W 130–125				McNichols Sports Arena	51–27
79	April 9; 8:30 p.m. MST	@ L.A. Lakers	L 119–148	English (28)	Kopicki (9)	Evans (9)	The Forum; 17,505	51–28
80	April 10	@ L.A. Clippers	L 127–129				Los Angeles Memorial Sports Arena	51–29
81	April 13	@ Golden State	W 127–120				Oakland–Alameda County Coliseum Arena	52–29
82	April 14	Portland	L 112–117				Memorial Coliseum	52–30

1984–85 schedule

=== Playoffs ===
1985 playoff game log
Western Conference First Round: 3–2 (home: 2–1; road: 1–1)

Game	Date	Team	Score	High points	High rebounds	High assists	Location Attendance	Series
1	April 18	San Antonio	W 141–111	Alex English (33)	Elston Turner (8)	Fat Lever (11)	McNichols Sports Arena; 12,128	1–0
2	April 20	San Antonio	L 111–113	Alex English (29)	Wayne Cooper (10)	Fat Lever (13)	McNichols Sports Arena; 17,022	1–1
3	April 23	@ San Antonio	W 115–112	Alex English (27)	Calvin Natt (8)	Calvin Natt (8)	HemisFair Arena; 8,799	2–1
4	April 26	@ San Antonio	L 111–116	Alex English (27)	Alex English (8)	Fat Lever (7)	HemisFair Arena; 8,621	2–2
5	April 28	San Antonio	W 126–99	Alex English (33)	Calvin Natt (10)	Fat Lever (10)	McNichols Sports Arena; 17,022	3–2

Western Conference Semifinals: 4–1 (home: 3–0; road: 1–1)

Game	Date	Team	Score	High points	High rebounds	High assists	Location Attendance	Series
1	April 30	Utah	W 130–113	Alex English (31)	Fat Lever (16)	Fat Lever (18)	McNichols Sports Arena; 11,918	1–0
2	May 2	Utah	W 131–123 (OT)	Alex English (26)	Fat Lever (13)	Alex English (12)	McNichols Sports Arena; 16,317	2–0
3	May 4	@ Utah	L 123–131	Calvin Natt (30)	Mike Evans (8)	English, Lever (5)	Salt Palace Acord Arena; 12,178	2–1
4	May 5	@ Utah	W 125–118	Alex English (40)	Wayne Cooper (14)	Calvin Natt (10)	Salt Palace Acord Arena; 12,716	3–1
5	May 7	Utah	W 116–104	Alex English (30)	Wayne Cooper (11)	Alex English (6)	McNichols Sports Arena; 17,022	4–1

Western Conference Finals: 1–4 (home: 0–2; road: 1–2)

Game	Date	Team	Score	High points	High rebounds	High assists	Location Attendance	Series
1	May 11; 1:30 p.m. MDT	@ L.A. Lakers	L 122–139	English (30)	Issel (8)	Evans (11)	The Forum; 16,109	0–1
2	May 14; 9:00 p.m. MDT	@ L.A. Lakers	W 136–114	English (40)	Turner (11)	Turner (8)	The Forum; 17,505	1–1
3	May 17; 8:00 p.m. MDT	L.A. Lakers	L 118–136	Natt (30)	Natt (7)	Turner (6)	McNichols Sports Arena; 17,022	1–2
4	May 19; 4:00 p.m. MDT	L.A. Lakers	L 116–120	Natt, English (28)	Natt, English (8)	Turner (10)	McNichols Sports Arena; 17,022	1–3
5	May 22; 9:30 p.m. MDT	@ L.A. Lakers	L 109–153	Cooper (23)	Schayes (9)	Lever (6)	The Forum; 17,505	1–4

1985 schedule

== Awards, records, and honors ==
- Vince Boryla, NBA Executive of the Year Award
- T.R. Dunn, NBA All-Defensive Second Team
