= 1984–85 Houston Rockets season =

- Head coach: Bill Fitch
- General manager: Ray Patterson
- Owner: Charlie Thomas
- Arena: The Summit

Results
- Record: 48–34 (.585)
- Place: Division: 2nd (Midwest); Conference: 3rd (Western)
- Playoff finish: First round (lost to Jazz 2–3)
- Stats at Basketball Reference

Local media
- Television: KTXH; Home Sports Entertainment
- Radio: KTRH

The 1984–85 Houston Rockets season saw the Rockets draft Akeem Olajuwon. He was selected to play in the 1985 NBA All-Star Game.

In the playoffs, the Rockets lost to the Utah Jazz in five games in the First Round.

== Draft picks ==
= Hall of Famer

Round	Pick	Player	Position	Nationality	College/Club team
1	1	Akeem Olajuwon*	Center	Nigeria	Houston–Jr.
3	51	Jim Petersen	Forward/Center	United States	Minnesota
4	74	Willie Jackson	Forward	United States	Centenary
5	97	Al McClain		United States	New Hampshire
7	143	Joedy Gardner		United States	Long Beach State
8	166	Greg Wolff		United States	Angelo State
9	188	Bill Coon		United States	Presbyterian
10	210	Robert Turner		United States	Canisius

== Roster ==
Houston Rockets roster
Players

Pos.	No.	Player	Height	Weight	DOB	From
G/F	3	Craig Ehlo	6 ft 6 in (1.98 m)	180 lb (82 kg)		Washington State
G	9	Lionel Hollins	6 ft 3 in (1.91 m)	185 lb (84 kg)		Arizona State
G	30	Allen Leavell	6 ft 1 in (1.85 m)	170 lb (77 kg)		Oklahoma City
G/F	32	Lewis Lloyd	6 ft 6 in (1.98 m)	205 lb (93 kg)		Drake
PG	5	John Lucas II	6 ft 3 in (1.91 m)	175 lb (79 kg)		Maryland
F	22	Rodney McCray	6 ft 7 in (2.01 m)	220 lb (100 kg)		Louisville
C	34	Akeem Olajuwon	7 ft 0 in (2.13 m)	255 lb (116 kg)		Houston
F/C	43	Jim Petersen	6 ft 10 in (2.08 m)	235 lb (107 kg)		Minnesota
F	33	Robert Reid	6 ft 8 in (2.03 m)	205 lb (93 kg)		St. Mary's (TX)
F/C	50	Ralph Sampson	7 ft 4 in (2.24 m)	228 lb (103 kg)		Virginia
SG	15	Mitchell Wiggins	6 ft 4 in (1.93 m)	185 lb (84 kg)		South Carolina

Coaches
Head coach
- Bill Fitch
Assistant(s)
- Carroll Dawson
- Rudy Tomjanovich

Legend
- (DP) Unsigned draft pick
- (FA) Free agent
- (S) Suspended
- Injured

== Regular season ==
=== Season standings ===
Midwest Division	W	L	PCT	GB	Home	Road	Div
y-Denver Nuggets	52	30	.634	–	34–7	18–23	17–13
x-Houston Rockets	48	34	.585	4	29–12	19–22	20–10
x-Dallas Mavericks	44	38	.537	8	24–17	20–21	14–16
x-Utah Jazz	41	41	.500	11	26–15	15–26	19–11
x-San Antonio Spurs	41	41	.500	11	30–11	11–30	12–18
Kansas City Kings	31	51	.378	21	23–18	8–33	8–22

#	Western Conference				
#	Team	W	L	PCT	GB
1	c-Los Angeles Lakers	62	20	.756	–
2	y-Denver Nuggets	52	30	.634	10
3	x-Houston Rockets	48	34	.585	14
4	x-Dallas Mavericks	44	38	.537	18
5	x-Portland Trail Blazers	42	40	.512	20
6	x-Utah Jazz	41	41	.500	21
7	x-San Antonio Spurs	41	41	.500	21
8	x-Phoenix Suns	36	46	.439	26
9	Seattle SuperSonics	31	51	.378	31
10	Los Angeles Clippers	31	51	.378	31
11	Kansas City Kings	31	51	.378	31
12	Golden State Warriors	22	60	.268	40

== Game log ==
=== Regular season ===
1984–85 game log
Total: 48–34 (home: 29–12; road: 19–22)
October: 2–0 (home: 1–0; road: 1–0)

Game	Date	Team	Score	High points	High rebounds	High assists	Location Attendance	Record
1	October 27, 1984	@ Dallas	W 121–111				Reunion Arena	1–0
2	October 30, 1984	Dallas	W 106–84				The Summit	2–0

November: 10–5 (home: 7–1; road: 3–4)

Game	Date	Team	Score	High points	High rebounds	High assists	Location Attendance	Record
3	November 1, 1984	@ Kansas City	W 109–106				Kemper Arena	3–0
4	November 3, 1984	New York	W 105–93				The Summit	4–0
5	November 6, 1984	Kansas City	W 108–94				The Summit	5–0
6	November 8, 1984	Seattle	W 99–89				The Summit	6–0
7	November 10, 1984	L.A. Clippers	W 117–92				The Summit	7–0
8	November 13, 1984	Cleveland	W 106–98				The Summit	8–0
9	November 14, 1984	@ Indiana	L 117–125				Market Square Arena	8–1
10	November 16, 1984	@ Denver	L 102–119				McNichols Sports Arena	8–2
11	November 17, 1984	San Antonio	W 141–133				The Summit	9–2
12	November 20, 1984	Detroit	W 123–117				The Summit	10–2
13	November 23, 1984	@ Utah	L 98–111				Salt Palace Acord Arena	10–3
14	November 24, 1984	@ Dallas	L 95–113				Reunion Arena	10–4
15	November 27, 1984	@ San Antonio	W 114–97				HemisFair Arena	11–4
16	November 28, 1984	Boston	L 100–110				The Summit	11–5
17	November 30, 1984	@ Atlanta	W 116–102				The Omni	12–5

December: 6–8 (home: 4–3; road: 2–5)

Game	Date	Team	Score	High points	High rebounds	High assists	Location Attendance	Record
18	December 1, 1984	Seattle	L 86–94				The Summit	12–6
19	December 4, 1984	L.A. Clippers	L 100–116				The Summit	12–7
20	December 6, 1984	@ Golden State	L 113–114				Oakland-Alameda County Coliseum Arena	12–8
21	December 8, 1984	@ Portland	W 127–120				Memorial Coliseum	13–8
22	December 9, 1984	@ Seattle	L 90–96				Kingdome	13–9
23	December 11, 1984	@ Phoenix	L 112–120				Arizona Veterans Memorial Coliseum	13–10
24	December 13, 1984	Atlanta	W 96–93				The Summit	14–10
25	December 15, 1984	Dallas	W 117–115				The Summit	15–10
26	December 18, 1984	@ Chicago	W 104–96				Chicago Stadium	16–10
27	December 19, 1984; 7:00 p.m. CST	L.A. Lakers	L 116–123	Sampson (21)	Sampson (10)	Hollins (15)	The Summit; 16,016	16–11
28	December 22, 1984	Denver	W 125–107				The Summit	17–11
29	December 26, 1984	@ Milwaukee	L 87–97				MECCA Arena	17–12
30	December 27, 1984	@ Kansas City	L 92–96				Kemper Arena	17–13
31	December 29, 1984	Portland	W 108–92				The Summit	18–13

January: 8–7 (home: 4–2; road: 4–5)

Game	Date	Team	Score	High points	High rebounds	High assists	Location Attendance	Record
32	January 2, 1985	@ Denver	W 113–111				McNichols Sports Arena	19–13
33	January 5, 1985	@ Golden State	W 103–94				Oakland-Alameda County Coliseum Arena	20–13
34	January 6, 1985	@ Utah	L 92–121				Salt Palace Acord Arena	20–14
35	January 8, 1985	Kansas City	W 112–110				The Summit	21–14
36	January 11, 1985	@ Philadelphia	L 108–115				The Spectrum	21–15
37	January 13, 1985	@ New Jersey	L 99–100				Brendan Byrne Arena	21–16
38	January 15, 1985	@ Portland	L 117–121				Memorial Coliseum	21–17
39	January 16, 1985	@ L.A. Clippers	L 88–98				Los Angeles Memorial Sports Arena	21–18
40	January 18, 1985	@ Phoenix	W 112–101				Arizona Veterans Memorial Coliseum	22–18
41	January 19, 1985	Utah	W 120–95				The Summit	23–18
42	January 22, 1985	Phoenix	W 101–97				The Summit	24–18
43	January 25, 1985	San Antonio	L 107–122				The Summit	24–19
44	January 26, 1985	Milwaukee	L 102–105				The Summit	24–20
45	January 28, 1985	New Jersey	W 97–93				The Summit	25–20
46	January 30, 1985; 9:30 p.m. CST	@ L.A. Lakers	W 116–113	Olajuwon (24)	Sampson (10)	Hollins (12)	The Forum; 17,505	26–20

February: 8–4 (home: 4–3; road: 4–1)

Game	Date	Team	Score	High points	High rebounds	High assists	Location Attendance	Record
47	February 2, 1985	Denver	W 131–128 (2OT)				The Summit	27–20
48	February 5, 1985; 7:00 p.m. CST	L.A. Lakers	L 104–113	Sampson (33)	Sampson (13)	Lloyd (8)	The Summit; 16,016	27–21
49	February 7, 1985	Golden State	W 112–105				The Summit	28–21
All-Star Break
50	February 12, 1985	Phoenix	W 126–114				The Summit	29–21
51	February 14, 1985	@ New York	W 113–105				Madison Square Garden	31–20
52	February 16, 1985	@ Cleveland	W 122–115				Richfield Coliseum	31–21
53	February 19, 1985	Dallas	L 115–124				The Summit	31–22
54	February 20, 1985	@ Phoenix	W 126–122				Arizona Veterans Memorial Coliseum	32–22
55	February 22, 1985	Portland	W 117–103				The Summit	33–22
56	February 23, 1985	Washington	L 115–123				The Summit	33–23
57	February 26, 1985; 9:30 p.m. CST	@ L.A. Lakers	L 94–100	Olajuwon (21)	Olajuwon (16)	McCray (8)	The Forum; 17,505	33–24
58	February 27, 1985	@ L.A. Clippers	W 117–109				Los Angeles Memorial Sports Arena	34–24

March: 9–6 (home: 7–2; road: 2–4)

Game	Date	Team	Score	High points	High rebounds	High assists	Location Attendance	Record
59	March 1, 1985	@ Utah	W 119–115				Salt Palace Acord Arena	35–24
60	March 3, 1985	Philadelphia	W 99–90				The Summit	36–24
61	March 5, 1985	@ Denver	L 131–133 (2OT)				McNichols Sports Arena	36–25
62	March 6, 1985	Utah	L 90–94				The Summit	36–26
63	March 8, 1985	Indiana	W 125–105				The Summit	37–26
64	March 9, 1985	@ San Antonio	W 123–117				HemisFair Arena	38–26
65	March 12, 1985	Denver	W 131–129				The Summit	39–26
66	March 15, 1985	@ Washington	L 114–120				Capital Centre	39–27
67	March 17, 1985	@ Boston	L 120–134				Boston Garden	39–28
68	March 19, 1985	Chicago	W 106–100				The Summit	40–28
69	March 22, 1985; 7:30 p.m. CST	L.A. Lakers	L 107–130	McCray (21)	Sampson (10)	Lloyd, Lucas, McCray, Sampson (5)	The Summit; 16,018	40–29
70	March 26, 1985	Kansas City	W 115–93				The Summit	41–29
71	March 27, 1985	@ Detroit	L 110–127				Joe Louis Arena	41–30
72	March 29, 1985	Golden State	W 121–116				The Summit	42–30
73	March 30, 1985	Utah	W 106–96				The Summit	43–30

April: 5–4 (home: 2–1; road: 3–3)

Game	Date	Team	Score	High points	High rebounds	High assists	Location Attendance	Record
74	April 1, 1985	@ Seattle	W 127–116				Kingdome	44–30
75	April 2, 1985	@ Portland	L 113–127				Memorial Coliseum	44–31
76	April 4, 1985	@ Golden State	L 108–113				Oakland-Alameda County Coliseum Arena	44–32
77	April 6, 1985	@ Dallas	W 139–127 (2OT)				Reunion Arena	45–32
78	April 7, 1985	@ San Antonio	L 105–126				HemisFair Arena	45–33
79	April 9, 1985	San Antonio	W 124–103				The Summit	46–33
80	April 11, 1985	@ Kansas City	W 125–123				Kemper Arena	47–33
81	April 12, 1985	L.A. Clippers	L 110–115				The Summit	47–34
82	April 14, 1985	Seattle	W 121–98				The Summit	48–34

1984–85 schedule

=== Playoffs ===
1985 playoff game log
First Round: 2–3 (home: 1–2; road: 1–1)

Game	Date	Team	Score	High points	High rebounds	High assists	Location Attendance	Series
1	April 19, 1985	Utah	L 101–115	Sampson (26)	Sampson (24)	Hollins (7)	The Summit; 13,185	0–1
2	April 21, 1985	Utah	W 122–96	Lloyd (27)	Sampson (14)	Lloyd, Lucas (6)	The Summit; 14,139	1–1
3	April 24, 1985	@ Utah	L 104–112	Olajuwon (26)	Olajuwon (16)	Lucas (7)	Salt Palace Acord Arena; 12,316	1–2
4	April 26, 1985	@ Utah	W 96–94	Sampson, Olajuwon (18)	Sampson (18)	Lucas (5)	Salt Palace Acord Arena; 12,690	2–2
5	April 28, 1985	Utah	L 97–104	Olajuwon (32)	Olajuwon (14)	Lucas (8)	The Summit; 16,016	2–3

1985 schedule

== Player statistics ==
Legend
GP	Games played	GS	Games started	MPG	Minutes per game
FG%	Field-goal percentage	3P%	3-point field-goal percentage	FT%	Free-throw percentage
RPG	Rebounds per game	APG	Assists per game	SPG	Steals per game
BPG	Blocks per game	PPG	Points per game

=== Season ===
Player	GP	GS	MPG	FG%	3FG%	FT%	RPG	APG	SPG	BPG	PPG

=== Playoffs ===
Player	GP	GS	MPG	FG%	3FG%	FT%	RPG	APG	SPG	BPG	PPG

== Awards and records ==
=== Awards ===
- Ralph Sampson, NBA All-Star Game Most Valuable Player Award
- Akeem Olajuwon, NBA All-Defensive Second Team
- Akeem Olajuwon, NBA All-Rookie Team 1st Team

== Transactions ==
=== Free agents ===
==== Additions ==== : Player / Signed / Former team	==== Subtractions ==== : Player / Left / New team

== See also ==
- 1984–85 NBA season
