= 1984–85 Seattle SuperSonics season =

NBA professional basketball team season

- Head coach: Lenny Wilkens
- General manager: Les Habegger
- Owner: Barry Ackerley
- Arena: Kingdome

Results
- Record: 31–51 (.378)
- Place: Division: 4th (Pacific); Conference: 9th (Western)
- Playoff finish: Did not qualify
- Stats at Basketball Reference

Local media
- Television: KIRO-TV
- Radio: KING

The 1984–85 Seattle SuperSonics season was the Seattle SuperSonics' 18th season in the NBA.

It is also their first year without All-Star Gus Williams.

== Offseason ==
=== Draft ===
Round	Pick	Player	Position	Nationality	College
2	28	Cory Blackwell	SF	United States	Wisconsin
2	39	Danny Young	PG	United States	Wake Forest
3	52	Terry Williams	G	United States	Alabama
4	83	Jeff Jenkins	F	United States	Xavier
5	106	Eli Pasquale	G	Canada	Victoria
6	129	Graylin Warner	F	United States	Southwestern Lousiana
7	152	Gary Gatewood	G	United States	Oregon
8	175	Jerry McMillan	G	United States	DePaul
9	197	Mike Williams	C	United States	Idaho State
10	219	Greg Brandon	F	United States	Creighton

== Roster ==
1984–85 Seattle SuperSonics roster
Players

Pos.	No.	Player	Height	Weight	DOB	From
SF	30	Cory Blackwell	6 ft 6 in (1.98 m)	210 lb (95 kg)		Wisconsin
C	34	Frank Brickowski	6 ft 9 in (2.06 m)	240 lb (109 kg)		Penn State
PF	24	Tom Chambers	6 ft 10 in (2.08 m)	220 lb (100 kg)		Utah
C	53	Joe Cooper	6 ft 10 in (2.08 m)	230 lb (104 kg)		Colorado
PG	15	Gerald Henderson	6 ft 2 in (1.88 m)	175 lb (79 kg)		VCU
SF	51	Reggie King	6 ft 6 in (1.98 m)	225 lb (102 kg)		Alabama
C	40	Tim McCormick	6 ft 11 in (2.11 m)	240 lb (109 kg)		Michigan
PF	21	Scooter McCray	6 ft 9 in (2.06 m)	215 lb (98 kg)		Louisville
SG	35	John Schweitz	6 ft 6 in (1.98 m)	210 lb (95 kg)		Richmond
C	43	Jack Sikma	6 ft 11 in (2.11 m)	230 lb (104 kg)		Illinois Wesleyan
SG	14	Ricky Sobers	6 ft 3 in (1.91 m)	198 lb (90 kg)		UNLV
PG	20	Jon Sundvold	6 ft 2 in (1.88 m)	170 lb (77 kg)		Missouri
SF	23	Danny Vranes	6 ft 7 in (2.01 m)	210 lb (95 kg)		Utah
SG	4	Al Wood	6 ft 6 in (1.98 m)	193 lb (88 kg)		North Carolina
PG	22	Danny Young (DP)	6 ft 3 in (1.91 m)	175 lb (79 kg)		Wake Forest

Coaches
Head coach
- Lenny Wilkens
Assistant(s)
- Dave Harshman
- Dick Helm

Legend
- (DP) Unsigned draft pick
- (FA) Free agent
- (S) Suspended
- Injured

=== Salaries ===
Player	Salary
Jack Sikma	$1,149,000
Reggie King	$500,000
Al Wood	$450,000
Danny Vranes	$392,000
Tom Chambers	$374,000
Ricky Sobers	$277,000
Jon Sundvold	$158,000

=== Standings ===
Pacific Division	W	L	PCT	GB	Home	Road	Div
y-Los Angeles Lakers	62	20	.756	–	36–5	26–15	18–12
x-Portland Trail Blazers	42	40	.512	20	33–8	15–26	17–13
x-Phoenix Suns	36	46	.439	26	32–9	10–31	14–16
Seattle SuperSonics	31	51	.378	31	31–10	10–31	16–14
Los Angeles Clippers	31	51	.378	31	27–14	10–31	13–17
Golden State Warriors	22	60	.268	40	25–16	5–36	12–18

#	Western Conference				
#	Team	W	L	PCT	GB
1	c-Los Angeles Lakers	62	20	.756	–
2	y-Denver Nuggets	52	30	.634	10
3	x-Houston Rockets	48	34	.585	14
4	x-Dallas Mavericks	44	38	.537	18
5	x-Portland Trail Blazers	42	40	.512	20
6	x-Utah Jazz	41	41	.500	21
7	x-San Antonio Spurs	41	41	.500	21
8	x-Phoenix Suns	36	46	.439	26
9	Seattle SuperSonics	31	51	.378	31
10	Los Angeles Clippers	31	51	.378	31
11	Kansas City Kings	31	51	.378	31
12	Golden State Warriors	22	60	.268	40

z - clinched division title
y - clinched division title
x - clinched playoff spot

== Game log ==
1984–85 game log
October

Game	Date	Team	Score	High points	Location Attendance	Record
1	October 26	Utah	W 102–94	Danny Vranes (24)	Kingdome; 7,117	1–0
2	October 28	Phoenix	L 87–102	Tom Chambers (25)	Kingdome; 5,361	1–1
3	October 30	@ Portland	L 83–115	Tom Chambers (20)	Memorial Coliseum; 12,666	1–2

November

Game	Date	Team	Score	High points	Location Attendance	Record
4	November 1	L. A. Lakers	103-105	Tom Chambers (20)	Kingdome; 7,070	2–2
5	November 2	vs Utah	107-101	Tom Chambers (29)	Salt Palace; 3,955	2–3
6	November 6	vs San Antonio	99-91	Tom Chambers (26)	HemisFair Arena; 8,085	2–4
7	November 8	vs Houston	99-89	Tom Chambers (19)	The Summit; 15,202	2–5
8	November 10	vs Dallas	106-102	Jack Sikma (23)	Reunion Arena; 17,007	2–6
9	November 13	Golden State	102-109	Tom Chambers (26)	Kingdome; 5,105	3–6
10	November 16	Portland	89-91	Tom Chambers (24)	Kingdome; 10,904	4–6
11	November 18	New Jersey	102-97	Al Wood (25)	Kingdome; 5,473	4–7
12	November 20	Denver	124-114	Tom Chambers (21)	Kingdome; 5,388	4–8
13	November 23	Chicago	113-94	Al Wood (21)	Kingdome; 12,283	4–9
14	November 25	vs L. A. Lakers	94-105	Ricky Sobers (23)	The Forum; 12,270	5–9
15	November 27	Kansas City	96-104	Jack Sikma (24)	Kingdome; 5,160	6–9
16	November 28	vs L. A. Clippers	106-90	Jack Sikma (29)	Los Angeles Memorial Sports Arena; 6,261	6–10
17	November 30	vs Dallas	108-98	Tom Chambers (31)	Reunion Arena; 16,275	6–11

December

Game	Date	Team	Score	High points	Location Attendance	Record
18	December 1	vs Houston	86-94	Jack Sikma (28)	The Summit; 12,734	7–11
19	December 3	Phoenix	96-108	Jack Sikma (29)	Kingdome; 5,401	8–11
20	December 6	vs Utah	99-106	Jack Sikma; Tom Chambers (26)	Salt Palace; 9,696	9–11
21	December 7	San Antonio	117-114	Tom Chambers (27)	Kingdome; 5,950	9–12
22	December 9	Houston	90-96	Tom Chambers (31)	Kingdome; 10,865	10–12
23	December 13	L. A. Lakers	122-124 (OT)	Tom Chambers (34)	Kingdome; 8,491	11–12
24	December 15	vs Kansas City	110-105	Gerald Henderson (18)	Kemper Arena; 5,732	11–13
25	December 16	vs Denver	101-112	Tom Chambers (27)	McNichols Sports Arena; 6,108	12–13
26	December 18	Portland	99-109	Jack Sikma (27)	Kingdome; 7,091	13–13
27	December 19	vs L. A. Clippers	91-86	Al Wood (23)	Los Angeles Memorial Sports Arena; 10,542	13–14
28	December 21	vs Golden State	94-91	Tom Chambers (26)	Oakland-Alameda County Coliseum Arena; 4,390	13–15
29	December 23	L. A. Clippers	97-107	Tom Chambers (31)	Kingdome; 8,014	14–15
30	December 26	vs L. A. Lakers	101-97	Al Wood (23)	The Forum; 15,582	14–16
31	December 27	Golden State	101-98	Jack Sikma (26)	Kingdome; 8,440	14–17
32	December 29	Denver	115-108	Tom Chambers (34)	Kingdome; 8,003	14–18

January

Game	Date	Team	Score	High points	Location Attendance	Record
33	January 2	Philadelphia	118-109	Tom Chambers (26)	Kingdome; 10,362	14–19
34	January 3	vs Portland	123-89	Tim McCormick (20)	Memorial Coliseum; 12,666	14–20
35	January 5	Indiana	97-104	Tom Chambers (26)	Kingdome; 6,242	15–20
36	January 7	Dallas	102-84	Tom Chambers (24)	Kingdome; 6,054	15–21
37	January 9	vs Phoenix	94-88	Jack Sikma (14)	Arizona Veterans Memorial Coliseum; 10,746	15–22
38	January 10	vs Golden State	86-89	Jack Sikma (25)	Oakland-Alameda County Coliseum Arena; 4,778	16–22
39	January 13	Kansas City	114-119	Gerald Henderson (31)	Kingdome; 7,814	17–22
40	January 15	L. A. Clippers	83-101	Tom Chambers (24)	Kingdome; 5,612	18–22
41	January 18	vs Atlanta	104-90	Jack Sikma (16)	Omni Coliseum; 6,749	18–23
42	January 19	vs Cleveland	105-106	Jack Sikma (31)	Coliseum at Richfield; 5,987	19–23
43	January 22	vs New York	92-90	Tom Chambers (28)	Madison Square Garden (IV); 7,850	19–24
44	January 23	vs Boston	97-107	Jack Sikma (34)	Boston Garden; 14,890	20–24
45	January 25	vs Chicago	93-76	Jack Sikma (16)	Chicago Stadium; 17,032	20–25
46	January 26	vs Detroit	132-113	Gerald Henderson (25)	Pontiac Silverdome; 22,411	20–26
47	January 31	San Antonio	94-96	Jack Sikma (24)	Kingdome; 5,826	21–26

February

Game	Date	Team	Score	High points	Location Attendance	Record
48	February 1	Milwaukee	L 91–109	Tom Chambers (22)	Kingdome; 7,830	21–27
49	February 3	vs Phoenix	120-109	Jack Sikma (30)	Arizona Veterans Memorial Coliseum; 12,019	21–28
50	February 5	New York	110-108	Jack Sikma (30)	Kingdome; 6,538	21–29
51	February 6	vs Denver	120-101	Tom Chambers (22)	McNichols Sports Arena; 8,256	21–30
52	February 12	Washington	94-109	Tom Chambers (34)	Kingdome; 12,203	22–30
53	February 14	Boston	110-94	Jack Sikma (24)	Kingdome; 13,509	22–31
54	February 16	Kansas City	111-106	Al Wood (25)	Kingdome; 6,685	22–32
55	February 20	vs L. A. Clippers	105-118	Tim McCormick (27)	Los Angeles Memorial Sports Arena; 8,447	23–32
56	February 22	Denver	123-133	Tom Chambers (29)	Kingdome; 8,102	24–32
57	February 24	L. A. Clippers	102-108	Gerald Henderson; Al Wood (18)	Kingdome; 7,474	25–32
58	February 26	vs Golden State	128-119	Al Wood (26)	Oakland-Alameda County Coliseum Arena; 5,104	25–33
59	February 28	Cleveland	120-95	Tom Chambers; Al Wood (15)	Kingdome; 5,016	25–34

March

Game	Date	Team	Score	High points	Location Attendance	Record
60	March 2	vs Indiana	92-106	Tom Chambers (27)	Market Square Arena; 8,004	26–34
61	March 5	vs Milwaukee	102-87	Ricky Sobers (16)	MECCA Arena; 10,897	26–35
62	March 6	vs New Jersey	129-108	Tim McCormick (27)	Brendan Byrne Arena; 9,840	26–36
63	March 8	vs Philadelphia	128-114	Ricky Sobers (26)	The Spectrum; 15,071	26–37
64	March 9	vs Washington	92-93	Tom Chambers (29)	Capital Centre; 8,967	27–37
65	March 11	vs Dallas	103-100	Tom Chambers (26)	Reunion Arena; 16,794	27–38
66	March 14	San Antonio	100-93	Al Wood; Tom Chambers (19)	Kingdome; 5,580	27–39
67	March 16	Atlanta	99-108	Jack Sikma (24)	Kingdome; 6,341	28–39
68	March 17	Detroit	98-106	Tom Chambers (21)	Kingdome; 5,840	29–39
69	March 20	Golden State	109-123	Tim McCormick (24)	Kingdome; 5,641	30–39
70	March 22	Utah	110-85	Frank Brickowski (21)	Kingdome; 6,337	30–40
71	March 24	vs San Antonio	104-99	Tim McCormick (29)	HemisFair Arena; 7,300	30–41
72	March 25	vs Kansas City	121-106	Tom Chambers (24)	Kemper Arena; 3,787	30–42
73	March 27	L. A. Lakers	122-97	Tom Chambers (34)	Kingdome; 10,542	30–43
74	March 29	Portland	125-99	Tom Chambers (16)	Kingdome; 11,088	30–44

April

Game	Date	Team	Score	High points	Location Attendance	Record
75	April 1	Houston	127-116	Tom Chambers (26)	Kingdome; 6,648	30–45
76	April 2	vs Phoenix	119-109	Jon Sundvold (24)	Arizona Veterans Memorial Coliseum; 9,742	30–46
77	April 4	vs Utah	118-119	Tom Chambers (34)	Salt Palace; 9,250	31–46
78	April 5	vs Portland	145-120	Tom Chambers (22)	Memorial Coliseum; 12,666	31–47
79	April 7	Phoenix	125-110	Tom Chambers (38)	Kingdome; 5,672	31–48
80	April 11	Dallas	124-80	Al Wood (22)	Kingdome; 4,272	31–49
81	April 12	vs L. A. Lakers	145-131	Al Wood (35)	The Forum; 15,434	31–50
82	April 14	vs Houston	121-98	Tom Chambers (27)	The Summit; 10,118	31–51

1984–85 season schedule

- Green background indicates win.
- Red background indicates loss.

== Player statistics ==
Note: GP= Games played; FG= Field Goals; FT= Free Throws; FTA = Free Throws Attempted; AST = Assists; PTS = Points

Player	GP	FG	FT	FTA	AST	PTS
Tom Chambers	81	629	475	571	209	1739
Jack Sikma	68	461	335	393	285	1259
Al Wood	80	515	166	214	236	1203
Gerald Henderson	79	427	199	255	559	1062
Tim McCormick	78	269	188	263	78	726
Ricky Sobers	71	280	132	162	252	700
Danny Vranes	76	186	67	127	152	440
Jon Sundvold	73	170	48	59	206	400
Frank Brickowski	78	150	85	127	100	385
Cory Blackwell	60	87	28	55	26	202
Reggie King	60	63	41	59	53	167
John Schweitz	19	25	7	10	18	57
Joe Cooper	3	7	3	6	2	17
Scooter McCray	6	6	3	4	7	15
Danny Young	3	2	0	0	2	4

== Awards and records ==
1985 NBA All-Star Game selections (game played on February 10, 1985)

- Jack Sikma

Non All-Star Awards and records

- Danny Vranes, All-Defensive 2nd Team
- Jack Sikma, December 2 Player of The Month

== See also ==
- 1984-85 NBA season
