= 1984–85 Kansas City Kings season =

NBA professional basketball team season

- Head coach: Jack McKinney; Phil Johnson
- Owners: Joseph Benvenuti; Stephen Cippa; Robert Cook; Gregg Lukenbill; Frank Lukenbill; Frank McCormick
- Arena: Kemper Arena

Results
- Record: 31–51 (.378)
- Place: Division: 6th (Midwest); Conference: 11th (Western)
- Playoff finish: Did not qualify
- Stats at Basketball Reference

Local media
- Television: KZKC; Sports Time
- Radio: KMBZ

The 1984-85 Kansas City Kings season was the Kings 36th season in the NBA and their 13th and final season in the city of Kansas City. The Kings finished with a 31–51 record, placing them in sixth place in the Midwest Division, and in a three-way tie for ninth place in the NBA's Western Conference, along with the Seattle SuperSonics and the Los Angeles Clippers. As a result, the Kings did not qualify for the NBA Playoffs in their final season in Kansas City, and relocated to the California capital of Sacramento after the season.

== Draft picks ==
Round	Pick	Player	Position	Nationality	College
1	9	Otis Thorpe	PF/C	United States	Providence
3	54	Roosevelt Chapman		United States	Dayton
3	56	Jeff Allen		United States	St. John's
4	80	Carl Henry	SG	United States	Kansas
5	102	Jim Foster		United States	South Carolina
6	126	Bruce Vanley		United States	Tulsa
7	148	Chip Harris		United States	Robert Morris (PA)
8	172	Nate Rollins		United States	Fort Hays State
9	193	Greg Turner		United States	Auburn
10	216	Victor Coleman		United States	Northwest Missouri State

== Roster ==
1984–85 Kansas City Kings roster
Players

Pos.	No.	Player	Height	Weight	DOB	From
G	10	Don Buse	6 ft 4 in (1.93 m)	190 lb (86 kg)		Evansville
G	22	Larry Drew	6 ft 1 in (1.85 m)	170 lb (77 kg)		Missouri
G/F	8	Eddie Johnson	6 ft 7 in (2.01 m)	215 lb (98 kg)		Illinois
C	35	Mark McNamara	6 ft 11 in (2.11 m)	235 lb (107 kg)		California
F/C	50	Joe C. Meriweather	6 ft 10 in (2.08 m)	215 lb (98 kg)		Southern Illinois
F	20	Ed Nealy	6 ft 7 in (2.01 m)	238 lb (108 kg)		Kansas State
F	53	Mark Olberding	6 ft 8 in (2.03 m)	225 lb (102 kg)		Minnesota
G	24	Reggie Theus	6 ft 7 in (2.01 m)	190 lb (86 kg)		UNLV
C	41	LaSalle Thompson	6 ft 10 in (2.08 m)	245 lb (111 kg)		Texas
F/C	33	Otis Thorpe	6 ft 9 in (2.06 m)	225 lb (102 kg)		Providence
F	40	Pete Verhoeven	6 ft 9 in (2.06 m)	215 lb (98 kg)		Fresno State
G	42	Mike Woodson	6 ft 5 in (1.96 m)	195 lb (88 kg)		Indiana

Coaches
Head coach
- Phil Johnson
Assistant(s)
- Frank Hamblen

Legend
- (DP) Unsigned draft pick
- (FA) Free agent
- (S) Suspended
- Injured

== Regular season ==
=== Season standings ===
Midwest Division	W	L	PCT	GB	Home	Road	Div
y-Denver Nuggets	52	30	.634	–	34–7	18–23	17–13
x-Houston Rockets	48	34	.585	4	29–12	19–22	20–10
x-Dallas Mavericks	44	38	.537	8	24–17	20–21	14–16
x-Utah Jazz	41	41	.500	11	26–15	15–26	19–11
x-San Antonio Spurs	41	41	.500	11	30–11	11–30	12–18
Kansas City Kings	31	51	.378	21	23–18	8–33	8–22

#	Western Conference				
#	Team	W	L	PCT	GB
1	c-Los Angeles Lakers	62	20	.756	–
2	y-Denver Nuggets	52	30	.634	10
3	x-Houston Rockets	48	34	.585	14
4	x-Dallas Mavericks	44	38	.537	18
5	x-Portland Trail Blazers	42	40	.512	20
6	x-Utah Jazz	41	41	.500	21
7	x-San Antonio Spurs	41	41	.500	21
8	x-Phoenix Suns	36	46	.439	26
9	Seattle SuperSonics	31	51	.378	31
10	Los Angeles Clippers	31	51	.378	31
11	Kansas City Kings	31	51	.378	31
12	Golden State Warriors	22	60	.268	40

z - clinched division title
y - clinched division title
x - clinched playoff spot

== Player statistics ==
Legend
GP	Games played	GS	Games started	MPG	Minutes per game
FG%	Field-goal percentage	3P%	3-point field-goal percentage	FT%	Free-throw percentage
RPG	Rebounds per game	APG	Assists per game	SPG	Steals per game
BPG	Blocks per game	PPG	Points per game

Player	GP	GS	MPG	FG%	3FG%	FT%	RPG	APG	SPG	BPG	PPG

== See also ==
- 1984-85 NBA season
