= Tom Sluby =

American basketball player (born 1962)

Personal information
- Born: February 18, 1962 (age 64) Washington, D.C., U.S.
- Listed height: 6 ft 4 in (1.93 m)
- Listed weight: 200 lb (91 kg)

Career information
- High school: Gonzaga (Washington, D.C.)
- College: Notre Dame (1980–1984)
- NBA draft: 1984: 2nd round, 41st overall pick
- Drafted by: Dallas Mavericks
- Playing career: 1984–1985
- Position: Shooting guard
- Number: 7

Career history
- 1984–1985: Dallas Mavericks

Career highlights
- Fourth-team Parade All-American (1980); McDonald's All-American (1980)
- Stats at NBA.com
- Stats at Basketball Reference

Tom Griffin Sluby (born February 18, 1962) is an American former professional basketball player. He was a 6-foot-4-inch (1.93 m) and 200 pounds (91 kg) shooting guard and played collegiately at the University of Notre Dame from 1980–1984.

Sluby was made the 17th pick in the second round of the 1984 NBA draft by the Dallas Mavericks and played 31 games with them in the 1984-85 season, in which he averaged 2.4 points, 0.4 rebounds and 0.5 assists per game.

== Career statistics ==
Legend
GP	Games played	GS	Games started	MPG	Minutes per game
FG%	Field goal percentage	3P%	3-point field goal percentage	FT%	Free throw percentage
RPG	Rebounds per game	APG	Assists per game	SPG	Steals per game
BPG	Blocks per game	PPG	Points per game	**Bold**	Career high

=== NBA ===
==== Regular season ====
Year	Team	GP	GS	MPG	FG%	3P%	FT%	RPG	APG	SPG	BPG	PPG
1984–85	Dallas	31	0	4.9	.517	.000	.619	.4	.5	.1	.0	2.4
