= 1984–85 Utah Jazz season =

NBA professional basketball team season

- Head coach: Frank Layden
- General manager: Frank Layden
- Owner: Sam Battistone
- Arena: Salt Palace Acord Arena; Thomas & Mack Center (2 games)

Results
- Record: 41–41 (.500)
- Place: Division: 4th (Midwest); Conference: 6th (Western)
- Playoff finish: Conference semifinals (lost to Nuggets 1–4)
- Stats at Basketball Reference

Local media
- Television: KSL-TV
- Radio: KSL

The 1984–85 Utah Jazz season was future all-time NBA assist leader John Stockton's first in the NBA. The Jazz selected Stockton with the 16th overall pick in the 1984 NBA Draft.

== Draft picks ==
Round	Pick	Player	Position	Nationality	College
1	16	John Stockton	PG	United States	Gonzaga
3	62	David Pope	F	United States	Norfolk State
4	86	Jim Rowinski	C	United States	Purdue
5	108	Marcus Gaither		United States	Farleigh Dickinson
6	132	Chris Harrison		United States	West Virginia Wesleyan
7	154	Bob Evans		United States	Southern Utah
8	178	Eric Booker		United States	Nevada-Las Vegas
9	199	Kelly Knight		United States	Kansas
10	222	Mike Curran		United States	Niagara

== Roster ==
Utah Jazz roster
Players

Pos.	No.	Player	Height	Weight	DOB	From
F/C	41	Thurl Bailey	6 ft 11 in (2.11 m)	215 lb (98 kg)		NC State
SF	4	Adrian Dantley	6 ft 5 in (1.96 m)	208 lb (94 kg)		Notre Dame
C	53	Mark Eaton	7 ft 4 in (2.24 m)	275 lb (125 kg)		UCLA
PG	14	Rickey Green	6 ft 0 in (1.83 m)	170 lb (77 kg)		Michigan
G	35	Darrell Griffith	6 ft 4 in (1.93 m)	190 lb (86 kg)		Louisville
G	20	Bob Hansen	6 ft 6 in (1.98 m)	190 lb (86 kg)		Iowa
C	44	Rich Kelley	7 ft 0 in (2.13 m)	235 lb (107 kg)		Stanford
SF	18	Pace Mannion	6 ft 7 in (2.01 m)	190 lb (86 kg)		Utah
C	5	Billy Paultz	6 ft 11 in (2.11 m)	235 lb (107 kg)		St. John's
PF	33	Fred Roberts	6 ft 10 in (2.08 m)	218 lb (99 kg)		BYU
G	12	John Stockton	6 ft 1 in (1.85 m)	170 lb (77 kg)		Gonzaga
C	45	Jeff Wilkins	6 ft 11 in (2.11 m)	230 lb (104 kg)		Illinois State

Coaches
Head coach
- Frank Layden
Assistant(s)
- Phil Johnson
- Scott Layden

Legend
- (DP) Unsigned draft pick
- (FA) Free agent
- (S) Suspended
- Injured

== Regular season ==
=== Season standings ===
Midwest Division	W	L	PCT	GB	Home	Road	Div
y-Denver Nuggets	52	30	.634	–	34–7	18–23	17–13
x-Houston Rockets	48	34	.585	4	29–12	19–22	20–10
x-Dallas Mavericks	44	38	.537	8	24–17	20–21	14–16
x-Utah Jazz	41	41	.500	11	26–15	15–26	19–11
x-San Antonio Spurs	41	41	.500	11	30–11	11–30	12–18
Kansas City Kings	31	51	.378	21	23–18	8–33	8–22

#	Western Conference				
#	Team	W	L	PCT	GB
1	c-Los Angeles Lakers	62	20	.756	–
2	y-Denver Nuggets	52	30	.634	10
3	x-Houston Rockets	48	34	.585	14
4	x-Dallas Mavericks	44	38	.537	18
5	x-Portland Trail Blazers	42	40	.512	20
6	x-Utah Jazz	41	41	.500	21
7	x-San Antonio Spurs	41	41	.500	21
8	x-Phoenix Suns	36	46	.439	26
9	Seattle SuperSonics	31	51	.378	31
10	Los Angeles Clippers	31	51	.378	31
11	Kansas City Kings	31	51	.378	31
12	Golden State Warriors	22	60	.268	40

== Game log ==
=== Regular season ===
1984–85 game log
Total: 41–41 (home: 26–15; road: 15–26)
October: 1–2 (home: 1–1; road: 0–1)

Game	Date	Team	Score	High points	High rebounds	High assists	Location Attendance	Record
1	October 26	@ Seattle	L 94–102				Kingdome	0–1
2	October 27	L.A. Clippers	L 94–103				Salt Palace	0–2
3	October 30	New York	W 117–111				Salt Palace	1–2

November: 8–7 (home: 7–1; road: 1–6)

Game	Date	Team	Score	High points	High rebounds	High assists	Location Attendance	Record
4	November 2	Seattle	W 107–101				Thomas & Mack Center	2–2
5	November 3	@ Golden State	L 107–112				Oakland–Alameda County Coliseum Arena	2–3
6	November 7	San Antonio	W 136–124				Salt Palace	3–3
7	November 9	Golden State	W 125–117 (OT)				Salt Palace	4–3
8	November 10	@ Denver	L 135–147				McNichols Sports Arena	4–4
9	November 12	Dallas	W 123–97				Salt Palace	5–4
10	November 15	@ Portland	L 120–129				Memorial Coliseum	5–5
11	November 17	Phoenix	W 108–94				Salt Palace	6–5
12	November 20	@ Kansas City	L 122–129				Kemper Arena	6–6
13	November 21	@ Atlanta	L 90–112				Lakefront Arena	6–7
14	November 23	Houston	W 111–98				Salt Palace	7–7
15	November 24	@ San Antonio	W 123–117				HemisFair Arena	8–7
16	November 27	@ Phoenix	L 102–115				Arizona Veterans Memorial Coliseum	8–8
17	November 28, 1984; 7:30 p.m. MST	L.A. Lakers	L 109–114	Griffith (23)	Eaton (11)	Hansen (9)	Salt Palace Acord Arena; 11,331	8–9
18	November 30	Denver	W 116–97				Salt Palace	9–9

December: 6–8 (home: 3–3; road: 3–5)

Game	Date	Team	Score	High points	High rebounds	High assists	Location Attendance	Record
19	December 1	@ Denver	L 111–118				McNichols Sports Arena	9–10
20	December 4	@ Golden State	W 107–105				Oakland–Alameda County Coliseum Arena	10–10
21	December 6	Seattle	L 99–106				Salt Palace	10–11
22	December 9	Kansas City	W 123–120				Thomas & Mack Center	11–11
23	December 11	@ Washington	W 85–82				Capital Centre	11–12
24	December 13	@ New York	L 115–119 (OT)				Madison Square Garden	12–12
25	December 14	@ Boston	L 106–117				Boston Garden	12–13
26	December 16	@ Milwaukee	L 102–115				MECCA Arena	12–14
27	December 18	@ Indiana	L 81–88				Market Square Arena	12–15
28	December 20	Detroit	W 117–116				Salt Palace	13–15
29	December 22	Dallas	L 96–113				Salt Palace	13–16
30	December 26	Kansas City	W 133–122				Salt Palace	14–16
31	December 28	Philadelphia	L 111–114				Salt Palace	14–17
32	December 29	@ Dallas	W 99–97				Reunion Arena	15–17

January: 5–9 (home: 5–4; road: 0–5)

Game	Date	Team	Score	High points	High rebounds	High assists	Location Attendance	Record
33	January 1	Indiana	L 117–119				Salt Palace	15–18
34	January 4	Denver	W 118–108				Salt Palace	16–18
35	January 6	Houston	W 121–92				Salt Palace	17–18
36	January 7	@ L.A. Clippers	L 106–116				Los Angeles Memorial Sports Arena	17–19
37	January 10, 1985; 8:30 p.m. MST	@ L.A. Lakers	L 112–120	Dantley (34)	Eaton (11)	Green (10)	The Forum; 14,547	17–20
38	January 12	@ Phoenix	L 94–109				Arizona Veterans Memorial Coliseum	17–21
39	January 15	@ San Antonio	L 101–121				HemisFair Arena	17–22
40	January 16	Washington	L 101–103				Salt Palace	17–23
41	January 18	Portland	W 128–120				Salt Palace	18–23
42	January 19	@ Houston	L 115–119				The Summit	18–24
43	January 22	New Jersey	W 102–99				Salt Palace	19–24
44	January 24	Cleveland	L 109–110				Salt Palace	19–25
45	January 26, 1985; 7:30 p.m. MST	L.A. Lakers	W 96–83	Dantley (31)	Eaton (10)	Green (8)	Salt Palace Acord Arena; 12,675	20–25
46	January 28	Denver	L 100–104				Salt Palace	20–26

February: 8–5 (home: 2–3; road: 6–2)

Game	Date	Team	Score	High points	High rebounds	High assists	Location Attendance	Record
47	February 1	@ Dallas	W 121–109				Reunion Arena	21–26
48	February 2	San Antonio	W 105–104				Salt Palace	22–26
49	February 5	@ Portland	L 106–126				Memorial Coliseum	22–27
50	February 7	@ Kansas City	W 114–96				Kemper Arena	23–27
51	February 12	@ Golden State	W 122–110				Oakland–Alameda County Coliseum Arena	24–28
52	February 13	Atlanta	L 88–94				Salt Palace	24–28
53	February 15	L.A. Clippers	W 109–100				Salt Palace	25–28
54	February 18	Boston	L 94–110				Salt Palace	25–29
55	February 20	@ New Jersey	W 110–104 (OT)				Brendan Byrne Arena	26–29
56	February 22	@ Cleveland	W 102–98				Richfield Coliseum	27–29
57	February 24	@ Philadelphia	L 108–117				The Spectrum	27–30
58	February 26	@ Dallas	W 103–96				Reunion Arena	28–30
59	February 27	Milwaukee	L 100–119				Salt Palace	28–31

March: 9–8 (home: 5–2; road: 4–6)

Game	Date	Team	Score	High points	High rebounds	High assists	Location Attendance	Record
60	March 1	Houston	L 115–119				Salt Palace	28–32
61	March 3	@ Portland	L 93–121				Memorial Coliseum	28–33
62	March 6	@ Houston	W 94–90				The Summit	29–33
63	March 7	@ Detroit	W 122–114				Cobo Arena	30–33
64	March 9	@ Chicago	W 111–105				Chicago Stadium	31–33
65	March 12, 1985; 8:30 p.m. MST	@ L.A. Lakers	L 108–123	Griffith (24)	Eaton (11)	Stockton (9)	The Forum; 17,505	32–33
66	March 13, 1985; 7:30 p.m. MST	L.A. Lakers	L 105–120	Roberts (24)	Bailey (11)	Stockton (8)	Salt Palace Acord Arena; 10,158	32–34
67	March 15	Kansas City	W 115–112				Salt Palace	32–35
68	March 17	@ Kansas City	L 101–107				Kemper Arena	32–36
69	March 18	Golden State	W 136–125				Salt Palace	33–36
70	March 20	@ L.A. Clippers	L 110–121				Los Angeles Memorial Sports Arena	33–37
71	March 22	@ Seattle	W 110–85				Kingdome	34–37
72	March 24	Chicago	W 110–92				Salt Palace	34–38
73	March 26	@ Denver	L 89–104				McNichols Sports Arena	35–38
74	March 27	Dallas	W 116–101				Salt Palace	36–38
75	March 29	San Antonio	W 114–109				Salt Palace	37–38
76	March 30	@ Houston	L 96–106				The Summit	37–39

April: 4–2 (home: 3–1; road: 1–1)

Game	Date	Team	Score	High points	High rebounds	High assists	Location Attendance	Record
77	April 4	Seattle	L 94–102				Salt Palace	37–40
78	April 6	Phoenix	W 105–94				Salt Palace	38–40
79	April 9	L.A. Clippers	W 123–104				Salt Palace	39–40
80	April 11	Portland	W 145–107				Salt Palace	40–40
81	April 12	@ Phoenix	L 92–96				Arizona Veterans Memorial Coliseum	40–41
82	April 14	@ San Antonio	W 104–102				HemisFair Arena	41–41

1984–85 schedule

=== Playoffs ===
1985 playoff game log
First Round: 3–2 (home: 1–1; road: 2–1)

Game	Date	Team	Score	High points	High rebounds	High assists	Location Attendance	Series
1	April 19	@ Houston	W 115–101	Adrian Dantley (34)	Thurl Bailey (10)	Rickey Green (10)	The Summit; 13,185	1–0
2	April 21	@ Houston	L 96–122	Jeff Wilkins (22)	Jeff Wilkins (12)	Green, Stockton (6)	The Summit; 14,139	1–1
3	April 24	Houston	W 112–104	Adrian Dantley (29)	Bailey, Stockton (11)	Rickey Green (10)	Salt Palace; 12,316	2–1
4	April 26	Houston	L 94–96	Rickey Green (22)	Thurl Bailey (12)	Rickey Green (11)	Salt Palace; 12,690	2–2
5	April 28	@ Houston	W 104–97	Adrian Dantley (25)	Mark Eaton (10)	Rickey Green (6)	The Summit; 16,016	3–2

Conference semifinals: 1–4 (home: 1–1; road: 0–3)

Game	Date	Team	Score	High points	High rebounds	High assists	Location Attendance	Series
1	April 30	@ Denver	L 113–130	Adrian Dantley (28)	Dantley, Kelley (9)	Rickey Green (6)	McNichols Sports Arena; 11,918	0–1
2	May 2	@ Denver	L 123–131 (OT)	Rickey Green (25)	Adrian Dantley (14)	Rickey Green (10)	McNichols Sports Arena; 16,317	0–2
3	May 4	Denver	W 131–123	Adrian Dantley (32)	Thurl Bailey (14)	Rickey Green (7)	Salt Palace; 12,178	1–2
4	May 5	Denver	L 118–125	Adrian Dantley (33)	Rich Kelley (8)	John Stockton (10)	Salt Palace; 12,716	1–3
5	May 7	@ Denver	L 104–116	Rickey Green (22)	Rich Kelley (11)	Rickey Green (7)	McNichols Sports Arena; 17,022	1–4

1985 schedule

== Player statistics ==
Legend
GP	Games played	GS	Games started	MPG	Minutes per game
FG%	Field-goal percentage	3P%	3-point field-goal percentage	FT%	Free-throw percentage
RPG	Rebounds per game	APG	Assists per game	SPG	Steals per game
BPG	Blocks per game	PPG	Points per game

=== Season ===
Player	GP	GS	MPG	FG%	3FG%	FT%	RPG	APG	SPG	BPG	PPG
J.J. Anderson											
Thurl Bailey											
Adrian Dantley											
John Drew											
Mark Eaton											
Rickey Green											
Darrell Griffith											
Bob Hansen											
Rich Kelley											
Pace Mannion											
Kenny Natt											
Billy Paultz											
Fred Roberts											
John Stockton											
Jeff Wilkins											

=== Playoffs ===
Player	GP	GS	MPG	FG%	3FG%	FT%	RPG	APG	SPG	BPG	PPG
Thurl Bailey											
Adrian Dantley											
Mark Eaton											
Rickey Green											
Darrell Griffith											
Bob Hansen											
Rich Kelley											
Pace Mannion											
Billy Paultz											
Fred Roberts											
John Stockton											
Jeff Wilkins											

== Awards and records ==
=== Awards ===
- Mark Eaton, NBA Defensive Player of the Year Award
- Mark Eaton, NBA All-Defensive First Team

== Transactions ==
=== Free agents ===
==== Additions ====
Player	Signed	Former team

==== Subtractions ====
Player	Left	New team

== See also ==
- 1985–86 Utah Jazz season
- 1984–85 NBA season
