= 1984–85 Dallas Mavericks season =

NBA professional basketball team season

- Head coach: Dick Motta
- General manager: Norm Sonju
- Owner: Don Carter
- Arena: Reunion Arena

Results
- Record: 44–38 (.537)
- Place: Division: 3rd (Midwest); Conference: 4th (Western)
- Playoff finish: First round (lost to Trail Blazers 1–3)
- Stats at Basketball Reference

Local media
- Television: KTVT; Home Sports Entertainment
- Radio: WBAP

The 1984–85 Dallas Mavericks season was the Mavericks' 5th season in the NBA.

For the second consecutive time in its young history, the Mavericks reached the playoffs. However, this time, they did not make it out of the first round, losing to the Portland Trail Blazers in five games.

== Draft picks ==
Round	Pick	Player	Position	Nationality	College
1	4	Sam Perkins	PF	United States	North Carolina
1	15	Terence Stansbury	SG	United States	Temple
2	38	Charlie Sitton	SF	United States	Oregon State
2	40	Anthony Teachey		United States	Wake Forest
2	41	Tom Sluby	SG	United States	Notre Dame
3	61	Jeff Cross	PF	United States	Maine
4	84	John Horrocks		United States	North Texas State
5	107	Dave Williams		United States	Illinois-Chicago
6	130	LaVerne Evans		United States	Marshall
7	153	George Turner		United States	California-Irvine
8	176	Leroy Sutton		United States	Arkansas
9	198	John Tudor		United States	Louisiana State
10	220	Napoleon Johnson		United States	Grambling State
11	185	Anthony Mealing	Guard	United States	North Dakota State

== Roster ==
1984–85 Dallas Mavericks roster
Players

Pos.	No.	Player	Height	Weight	DOB	From
SF	24	Mark Aguirre	6 ft 6 in (1.98 m)	232 lb (105 kg)	1959–12–10	DePaul
SG	22	Rolando Blackman	6 ft 6 in (1.98 m)	190 lb (86 kg)	1959–02–26	Kansas State
C	55	Wallace Bryant	7 ft 0 in (2.13 m)	245 lb (111 kg)	1959–07–14	San Francisco
PG	15	Brad Davis	6 ft 3 in (1.91 m)	180 lb (82 kg)	1955–12–17	Maryland
SF	14	Dale Ellis	6 ft 7 in (2.01 m)	205 lb (93 kg)	1960–08–06	Tennessee
PG	12	Derek Harper	6 ft 4 in (1.93 m)	185 lb (84 kg)	1961–10–13	Illinois
C	40	Kurt Nimphius	6 ft 10 in (2.08 m)	218 lb (99 kg)	1958–03–13	Arizona State
PF	44	Sam Perkins	6 ft 9 in (2.06 m)	239 lb (108 kg)	1961–06–14	North Carolina
SF	52	Charlie Sitton	6 ft 8 in (2.03 m)	210 lb (95 kg)	1962–07–03	Oregon State
SG	7	Tom Sluby	6 ft 4 in (1.93 m)	200 lb (91 kg)	1962–02–18	Notre Dame
PF	31	Jay Vincent	6 ft 7 in (2.01 m)	220 lb (100 kg)	1959–06–10	Michigan State

Coaches
Head coach
- Dick Motta
Assistant(s)
- Bob Weiss

Legend
- (DP) Unsigned draft pick
- (FA) Free agent
- (S) Suspended
- Injured

Roster
Updated: December 17, 1984

== Regular season ==
=== Season standings ===
Midwest Division	W	L	PCT	GB	Home	Road	Div
y-Denver Nuggets	52	30	.634	–	34–7	18–23	17–13
x-Houston Rockets	48	34	.585	4	29–12	19–22	20–10
x-Dallas Mavericks	44	38	.537	8	24–17	20–21	14–16
x-Utah Jazz	41	41	.500	11	26–15	15–26	19–11
x-San Antonio Spurs	41	41	.500	11	30–11	11–30	12–18
Kansas City Kings	31	51	.378	21	23–18	8–33	8–22

#	Western Conference				
#	Team	W	L	PCT	GB
1	c-Los Angeles Lakers	62	20	.756	–
2	y-Denver Nuggets	52	30	.634	10
3	x-Houston Rockets	48	34	.585	14
4	x-Dallas Mavericks	44	38	.537	18
5	x-Portland Trail Blazers	42	40	.512	20
6	x-Utah Jazz	41	41	.500	21
7	x-San Antonio Spurs	41	41	.500	21
8	x-Phoenix Suns	36	46	.439	26
9	Seattle SuperSonics	31	51	.378	31
10	Los Angeles Clippers	31	51	.378	31
11	Kansas City Kings	31	51	.378	31
12	Golden State Warriors	22	60	.268	40

z - clinched division title
y - clinched division title
x - clinched playoff spot

== Game log ==
=== Regular season ===
1984–85 game log
Total: 44–38 (home: 24–17; road: 20–21)
October: 2–2 (home: 1–1; road: 1–1)

Game	Date	Team	Score	High points	High rebounds	High assists	Location Attendance	Record
1	October 27, 1984	Houston	L 111–121				Reunion Arena	0–1
2	October 28; 7:00 p.m. CST	L.A. Lakers	W 107–96	Aguirre (31)	Vincent (10)	Davis, Nimphuis (6)	Reunion Arena; 17,007	1–1
3	October 30, 1984	@ Houston	L 84–106				The Summit	1–2
4	October 31, 1984	@ Indiana	W 101–100				Market Square Arena	2–2

November: 7–7 (home: 6–3; road: 1–4)

Game	Date	Team	Score	High points	High rebounds	High assists	Location Attendance	Record
5	November 2; 6:30 p.m. CST	@ Philadelphia	L 103–107				The Spectrum	2–3
6	November 3, 1984	Phoenix	L 93–105				Reunion Arena	2–4
7	November 6, 1984	New York	W 107–104				Reunion Arena	3–4
8	November 8, 1984	Atlanta	W 112–105 (OT)				Reunion Arena	4–4
9	November 10, 1984	Seattle	W 106–102				Reunion Arena	5–4
10	November 12, 1984	@ Utah	L 97–123				Salt Palace Acord Arena	5–5
11	November 13, 1984	@ Portland	W 101–94				Memorial Coliseum	6–5
12	November 15, 1984	@ Golden State	L 112–117				Oakland-Alameda County Coliseum Arena	6–6
13	November 17, 1984	Detroit	L 110–124				Reunion Arena	6–7
14	November 20, 1984	Milwaukee	W 109–108				Reunion Arena	7–7
15	November 24, 1984	Houston	W 113–95				Reunion Arena	8–7
16	November 27; 7:30 p.m. CST	Boston	L 99–114	Vincent (27)	Vincent (15)	Davis (7)	Reunion Arena; 17,007	8–8
17	November 29, 1984	@ San Antonio	L 116–124				HemisFair Arena	8–9
18	November 30, 1984	Seattle	W 108–98				Reunion Arena	9–9

December: 6–6 (home: 3–2; road: 3–4)

Game	Date	Team	Score	High points	High rebounds	High assists	Location Attendance	Record
19	December 5, 1985	L.A. Clippers	L 106–110				Reunion Arena	9–10
20	December 6, 1984	@ New York	W 112–83				Madison Square Garden	10–10
21	December 8, 1984	@ Chicago	L 97–99				Chicago Stadium	10–11
22	December 12, 1984	Kansas City	W 116–107				Reunion Arena	11–11
23	December 14, 1984	San Antonio	W 119–102				Reunion Arena	12–11
24	December 15, 1984	@ Houston	L 115–117				The Summit	12–12
25	December 18, 1984	@ Milwaukee	L 96–110				MECCA Arena	12–13
26	December 21; 8:30 p.m. CST	@ Denver	L 93–116	Aguirre (19)	Vincent (7)	Harper (5)	McNichols Sports Arena; 7,538	12–14
27	December 22, 1984	@ Utah	W 113–96				Salt Palace Acord Arena	13–14
28	December 26, 1984	L.A. Clippers	W 124–118				Reunion Arena	14–14
29	December 28, 1984	@ Phoenix	W 125–111				Arizona Veterans Memorial Coliseum	15–14
30	December 29, 1984	Utah	L 97–99				Reunion Arena	15–15

January: 9–7 (home: 4–2; road: 5–5)

Game	Date	Team	Score	High points	High rebounds	High assists	Location Attendance	Record
31	January 3, 1985	@ San Antonio	L 115–116				HemisFair Arena	15–16
32	January 5, 1985	Kansas City	W 135–107				Reunion Arena	16–16
33	January 7, 1985	@ Seattle	W 102–84				Kingdome	17–16
34	January 8, 1985	@ Portland	W 108–102				Memorial Coliseum	18–16
35	January 10, 1985	@ Kansas City	W 117–110 (OT)				Kemper Arena	19–16
36	January 11; 7:30 p.m. CST	L.A. Lakers	L 102–121	Aguirre (28)	Aguirre (8)	Davis (6)	Reunion Arena; 17,007	19–17
37	January 13, 1985	Portland	W 124–101				Reunion Arena	20–17
38	January 15, 1985	@ Golden State	W 149–104				Oakland-Alameda County Coliseum Arena	21–17
39	January 16, 1985	@ Phoenix	L 95–98				Arizona Veterans Memorial Coliseum	21–18
40	January 18; 9:30 p.m. CST	@ L.A. Lakers	L 92–110	Aguirre (22)	Bryant, Vincent (7)	Davis (13)	The Forum; 17,505	21–19
41	January 19, 1985	@ L.A. Clippers	W 101–100				Los Angeles Memorial Sports Arena	22–19
42	January 23, 1985	San Antonio	W 122–110				Reunion Arena	23–19
43	January 24, 1985	@ Washington	L 92–93				Capital Centre	23–20
44	January 26, 1985	New Jersey	L 93–103				Reunion Arena	23–21
45	January 28; 7:30 p.m. CST	Philadelphia	W 111–109				Reunion Arena	24–21
46	January 31; 8:30 p.m. CST	@ Denver	L 110–121	Blackman (28)	Vincent (9)	Davis (7)	McNichols Sports Arena; 8,160	24–22

February: 8–4 (home: 4–3; road: 4–1)

Game	Date	Team	Score	High points	High rebounds	High assists	Location Attendance	Record
47	February 1, 1985	Utah	L 109–121				Reunion Arena	24–23
48	February 3; 7:30 p.m. CST	Denver	W 114–106	Vincent (24)	Perkins (16)	Davis (8)	Reunion Arena; 16,828	25–23
49	February 5, 1985	@ Atlanta (at New Orleans, LA)	W 112–103				Lakefront Arena	26–23
50	February 6, 1985	Golden State	W 129–103				Reunion Arena	27–23
All-Star Break
51	February 12, 1985	@ Cleveland	W 131–112				Richfield Coliseum	28–23
52	February 13, 1985	@ Detroit	L 119–124				Pontiac Silverdome	28–24
53	February 15, 1985	Phoenix	L 103–126				Reunion Arena	28–25
54	February 19, 1985	@ Houston	W 124–115				The Summit	29–25
55	February 20, 1985	Portland	W 104–98				Reunion Arena	30–25
56	February 22, 1985	Washington	W 110–101				Reunion Arena	31–25
57	February 23, 1985	@ Kansas City	W 121–98				Kemper Arena	32–25
58	February 26, 1985	Utah	L 96–103				Reunion Arena	32–26

March: 9–8 (home: 6–4; road: 3–4)

Game	Date	Team	Score	High points	High rebounds	High assists	Location Attendance	Record
59	March 1; 7:30 p.m. CST	Denver	L 140–141 (OT)	Aguirre (46)	Perkins (14)	Davis (11)	Reunion Arena; 17,007	32–27
60	March 2; 7:30 p.m. CST	L.A. Lakers	L 106–125	Aguirre (33)	Perkins (11)	Harper (5)	Reunion Arena; 17,007	32–28
61	March 4, 1985	@ Phoenix	W 107–99				Arizona Veterans Memorial Coliseum	33–28
62	March 5, 1985	Indiana	W 108–102				Reunion Arena	34–28
63	March 8; 6:30 p.m. CST	@ Boston	L 122–133	Aguirre (32)	Bryant, Vincent (8)	Harper (7)	Boston Garden; 14,890	34–29
64	March 10, 1985	@ New Jersey	W 126–113				Brendan Byrne Arena	35–29
65	March 11, 1985	Seattle	W 103–100				Reunion Arena	36–29
66	March 13, 1985	Kansas City	W 118–100				Reunion Arena	37–29
67	March 15; 7:30 p.m. CST	Denver	W 127–108	Aguirre (22)	Perkins (10)	Davis, Harper (9)	Reunion Arena; 17,007	38–29
68	March 16, 1985	Cleveland	L 128–135 (OT)				Reunion Arena	38–30
69	March 18; 8:30 p.m. CST	@ Denver	L 111–113	Aguirre (30)	Blackman (8)	Blackman (11)	McNichols Sports Arena; 12,968	38–31
70	March 19, 1985	San Antonio	W 96–89				Reunion Arena	39–31
71	March 22, 1985	@ San Antonio	W 123–114				HemisFair Arena	40–31
72	March 23, 1985	Chicago	L 97–107				Reunion Arena	40–32
73	March 26, 1985	Golden State	W 134–107				Reunion Arena	41–32
74	March 27, 1985	@ Utah	L 101–116				Salt Palace Acord Arena	41–33
75	March 29; 9:30 p.m. CST	@ L.A. Lakers	L 115–120	Aguirre (28)	Perkins (10)	Davis (12)	The Forum; 17,505	41–34

April: 3–4 (home: 0–2; road: 3–2)

Game	Date	Team	Score	High points	High rebounds	High assists	Location Attendance	Record
76	April 2, 1985	@ Golden State	W 127–121				Oakland-Alameda County Coliseum Arena	42–34
77	April 5, 1985	L.A. Clippers	L 122–126 (OT)				Reunion Arena	42–35
78	April 6, 1985	Houston	L 127–139 (2OT)				Reunion Arena	42–36
79	April 9, 1985	@ Kansas City	L 105–117				Kemper Arena	42–37
80	April 11, 1985	@ Seattle (at Tacoma, WA)	W 124–80				Tacoma Dome	43–37
81	April 12, 1985	@ Portland	L 111–131				Memorial Coliseum	43–38
82	April 14, 1985	@ L.A. Clippers	W 96–92				Los Angeles Memorial Sports Arena	44–38

1984–85 schedule

=== Playoffs ===
1985 playoff game log
First Round: 1–3 (home: 1–1; road: 0–2)

Game	Date	Team	Score	High points	High rebounds	High assists	Location Attendance	Series
1	April 18, 1985	Portland	W 139–131 (2OT)	Blackman (43)	Aguirre (14)	Blackman (6)	Reunion Arena; 17,007	1–0
2	April 20, 1985	Portland	L 121–124 (OT)	Blackman (41)	Perkins (19)	Harper (8)	Reunion Arena; 17,007	1–1
3	April 23, 1985	@ Portland	L 109–122	Aguirre, Blackman (30)	Perkins, Vincent (9)	Davis (5)	Memorial Coliseum; 12,666	1–2
4	April 25, 1985	@ Portland	L 113–115	Aguirre (39)	Perkins (10)	Davis (8)	Memorial Coliseum; 12,666	1–3

1985 schedule

== Player statistics ==
=== Ragular season ===
Player	POS	GP	GS	MP	REB	AST	STL	BLK	PTS	MPG	RPG	APG	SPG	BPG	PPG
Brad Davis	PG	82	82	2,539	193	581	91	10	825	31.0	2.4	7.1	1.1	.1	10.1
Sam Perkins	PF	82	42	2,317	605	135	63	63	903	28.3	7.4	1.6	.8	.8	11.0
Kurt Nimphius	C	82	40	2,010	408	183	30	126	500	24.5	5.0	2.2	.4	1.5	6.1
Derek Harper	PG	82	1	2,218	199	360	144	37	790	27.0	2.4	4.4	1.8	.5	9.6
Rolando Blackman	SG	81	80	2,834	300	289	61	16	1,598	35.0	3.7	3.6	.8	.2	19.7
Mark Aguirre	SF	80	79	2,699	477	249	60	24	2,055	33.7	6.0	3.1	.8	.3	25.7
Jay Vincent	PF	79	47	2,543	704	169	48	22	1,441	32.2	8.9	2.1	.6	.3	18.2
Dale Ellis	SF	72	4	1,314	238	56	46	7	667	18.3	3.3	.8	.6	.1	9.3
Wallace Bryant	C	56	35	860	241	84	21	24	164	15.4	4.3	1.5	.4	.4	2.9
Charlie Sitton	SF	43	0	304	60	26	7	6	91	7.1	1.4	.6	.2	.1	2.1
Tom Sluby	SG	31	0	151	12	16	3	0	73	4.9	.4	.5	.1	.0	2.4
Howard Carter	SG	11	0	66	3	4	1	0	9	6.0	.3	.4	.1	.0	.8

=== Playoffs ===
Player	POS	GP	GS	MP	REB	AST	STL	BLK	PTS	MPG	RPG	APG	SPG	BPG	PPG
Rolando Blackman	SG	4	4	169	26	19	2	2	131	42.3	6.5	4.8	.5	.5	32.8
Sam Perkins	PF	4	4	169	51	11	2	1	75	42.3	12.8	2.8	.5	.3	18.8
Mark Aguirre	SF	4	4	164	30	16	3	0	116	41.0	7.5	4.0	.8	.0	29.0
Brad Davis	PG	4	4	113	8	22	4	1	41	28.3	2.0	5.5	1.0	.3	10.3
Jay Vincent	PF	4	2	134	22	3	6	3	62	33.5	5.5	.8	1.5	.8	15.5
Dale Ellis	SF	4	1	68	7	3	4	0	23	17.0	1.8	.8	1.0	.0	5.8
Derek Harper	PG	4	0	132	12	20	6	1	26	33.0	3.0	5.0	1.5	.3	6.5
Kurt Nimphius	C	4	0	50	6	3	1	1	6	12.5	1.5	.8	.3	.3	1.5
Wallace Bryant	C	2	1	36	7	1	1	1	2	18.0	3.5	.5	.5	.5	1.0

== Awards and records ==
- Rolando Blackman, NBA All-Star Game

== See also ==
- 1984-85 NBA season
