= Calvin Natt =

American basketball player (born 1957)

Personal information
- Born: January 8, 1957 (age 69) Monroe, Louisiana, U.S.
- Listed height: 6 ft 6 in (1.98 m)
- Listed weight: 220 lb (100 kg)

Career information
- High school: Bastrop (Bastrop, Louisiana)
- College: Louisiana–Monroe (1975–1979)
- NBA draft: 1979: 1st round, 8th overall pick
- Drafted by: New Jersey Nets
- Playing career: 1979–1990
- Position: Small forward
- Number: 43, 33, 7, 42

Career history
- 1979–1980: New Jersey Nets
- 1980–1984: Portland Trail Blazers
- 1984–1989: Denver Nuggets
- 1989: San Antonio Spurs
- 1989–1990: Indiana Pacers

Career highlights
- NBA All-Star (1985); NBA All-Rookie First Team (1980); Consensus second-team All-American (1979); TAAC Player of the Year (1979)

Career NBA statistics
- Points: 10,291 (17.2 ppg)
- Rebounds: 4,070 (6.8 rpg)
- Assists: 1,306 (2.2 apg)
- Stats at NBA.com
- Stats at Basketball Reference

Calvin Leon Natt (born January 8, 1957) is an American former professional basketball player. A 6-foot-6-inch (1.98 m) small forward, Natt played at Northeast Louisiana University (now University of Louisiana at Monroe) under coach Lenny Fant. After college, he played 11 NBA seasons (1979–1990), spending time with the New Jersey Nets, Portland Trail Blazers, Denver Nuggets, San Antonio Spurs, and Indiana Pacers. He represented the Nuggets in the 1985 NBA All-Star Game, and retired with 10,291 career points. He is the older brother of former NBA player Kenny Natt. Natt's nickname was "Pit Bull".

Calvin Natt later became an ordained minister. He owns a funeral home in Denver, Colorado.

== NBA career statistics ==
Legend
GP	Games played	GS	Games started	MPG	Minutes per game
FG%	Field goal percentage	3P%	3-point field goal percentage	FT%	Free throw percentage
RPG	Rebounds per game	APG	Assists per game	SPG	Steals per game
BPG	Blocks per game	PPG	Points per game	**Bold**	Career high

=== Regular season ===
Year	Team	GP	GS	MPG	FG%	3P%	FT%	RPG	APG	SPG	BPG	PPG
1979–80	New Jersey	53		**38.6**	.479	.200	.711	**9.7**	2.1	**1.5**	.4	19.7
1979–80	Portland	25		32.4	.480	**.500**	.770	7.1	2.3	1.0	**.5**	20.4
1980–81	Portland	74		28.5	.497	**.500**	.707	5.8	2.1	1.0	.2	13.4
1981–82	Portland	75	71	34.7	.576	.250	.750	8.2	2.0	.8	**.5**	17.7
1982–83	Portland	**80**	**80**	36.0	.543	.150	.792	7.5	2.1	.8	.4	20.4
1983–84	Portland	79	74	33.4	.583	.118	.797	6.0	2.3	.9	.3	16.2
1984–85	Denver	78	76	34.1	.546	.000	.793	7.8	**3.1**	1.0	.4	**23.3**
1985–86	Denver	69	62	29.1	.504	.333	.801	6.3	2.4	.8	.2	17.7
1986–87	Denver	1	1	20.0	.400	–	**1.000**	5.0	2.0	1.0	.0	10.0
1987–88	Denver	27	7	19.7	.490	.000	.740	3.6	1.7	.5	.1	9.6
1988–89	Denver	14	0	12.0	.440	.000	.710	3.3	.5	.4	.1	4.7
1988–89	San Antonio	10	0	18.5	.379	–	.729	3.2	1.1	.2	.2	8.5
1989–90	Indiana	14	0	11.7	**.645**	–	.773	2.5	.6	.1	.0	4.1
Career		599	371	31.4	.528	.219	.768	6.8	2.2	.9	.3	17.2
All-Star		1	0	11.0	.333	–	.500	3.0	1.0	–	–	3.0

=== Playoffs ===
Year	Team	GP	GS	MPG	FG%	3P%	FT%	RPG	APG	SPG	BPG	PPG
1980	Portland	3	–	**41.7**	.438	.000	.600	8.0	.7	.7	**.3**	16.0
1981	Portland	3	–	31.7	.452	–	.500	6.7	.3	.3	**.3**	10.7
1983	Portland	7	–	39.1	.490	**.500**	.646	**9.1**	1.6	1.1	.1	18.9
1984	Portland	5	–	39.0	.514	.000	.694	7.6	1.8	**1.2**	.2	19.8
1985	Denver	**15**	**15**	33.9	**.550**	–	**.809**	6.6	**3.8**	.5	**.3**	**22.3**
1986	Denver	10	6	29.3	.465	.500	.780	7.9	2.8	.2	**.3**	17.9
1990	Indiana	2	0	7.0	.333	–	–	1.0	.5	.0	.0	1.0
Career		45	21	33.4	.503	.222	.736	7.2	2.4	.6	.3	18.4

== See also ==
- List of NCAA Division I men's basketball players with 30 or more rebounds in a game
- List of NCAA Division I men's basketball players with 2,000 points and 1,000 rebounds
