= Peter Verhoeven =

American basketball player (born 1959)

Personal information
- Born: February 15, 1959 (age 67) Hanford, California, U.S.
- Listed height: 6 ft 9 in (2.06 m)
- Listed weight: 215 lb (98 kg)

Career information
- High school: Hanford (Hanford, California)
- College: Fresno State (1977–1981)
- NBA draft: 1981: 4th round, 85th overall pick
- Drafted by: Portland Trail Blazers
- Playing career: 1981–1989
- Position: Power forward
- Number: 31, 40, 50

Career history
- 1981–1984: Portland Trail Blazers
- 1984–1985: Kansas City Kings
- 1985–1986: Golden State Warriors
- 1986–1987: Indiana Pacers
- 1987–1988: Charleston Gunners
- ?: Bosco A Coruña
- 1988–1989: Caja Guipúzcoa
- Stats at NBA.com
- Stats at Basketball Reference

Peter Gerard Verhoeven (born February 15, 1959) is an American former professional basketball player.

He was selected by the Portland Trail Blazers in the 1981 NBA draft and played for four teams throughout his six-year NBA career, averaging 3.5 points and 2.3 rebounds a game.

Born in Hanford, California, he played collegiately at Fresno State University until 1981, and in 2006 was inducted into the Fresno Athletic Hall of Fame.

== Career statistics ==
Legend
GP	Games played	GS	Games started	MPG	Minutes per game
FG%	Field goal percentage	3P%	3-point field goal percentage	FT%	Free throw percentage
RPG	Rebounds per game	APG	Assists per game	SPG	Steals per game
BPG	Blocks per game	PPG	Points per game	**Bold**	Career high

=== NBA ===
==== Regular season ====
Year	Team	GP	GS	MPG	FG%	3P%	FT%	RPG	APG	SPG	BPG	PPG
1981–82	Portland	**71**	**22**	**17.0**	.503	–	.708	**3.6**	**.7**	**.6**	**.3**	**4.9**
1982–83	Portland	48	0	11.0	.509	.000	.677	2.0	**.7**	.4	.2	4.1
1983–84	Portland	43	0	7.6	.500	.000	.680	1.4	.5	.5	**.3**	2.7
1984–85	Kansas City	54	0	6.8	.472	–	**.840**	1.2	.3	.3	.1	2.3
1985–86	Golden State	61	5	12.3	**.539**	**.500**	.581	2.6	.5	.5	**.3**	3.4
1986–87	Indiana	5	0	8.8	.357	–	–	1.4	.4	.4	.2	2.0
Career		282	27	11.4	.505	.250	.689	2.3	.5	.5	.2	3.5

==== Playoffs ====
Year	Team	GP	MPG	FG%	3p%	FT%	RPG	APG	SPG	BPG	PPG
1984	Portland	3	6.3	–	–	1.000	.0	.0	.3	.0	.7
