= Andrew Toney =

American basketball player (born 1957)

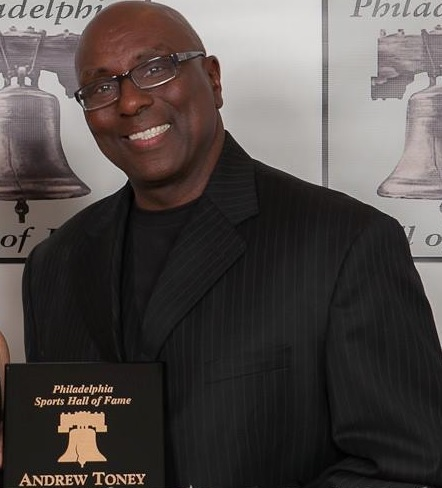
- Toney in 2013

Personal information
- Born: November 23, 1957 (age 68) Birmingham, Alabama, U.S.
- Listed height: 6 ft 3 in (1.91 m)
- Listed weight: 178 lb (81 kg)

Career information
- High school: Charles B. Glenn (Birmingham, Alabama)
- College: Louisiana (1976–1980)
- NBA draft: 1980: 1st round, 8th overall pick
- Drafted by: Philadelphia 76ers
- Playing career: 1980–1988
- Position: Shooting guard
- Number: 22

Career history
- 1980–1988: Philadelphia 76ers

Career highlights
- NBA champion (1983); 2× NBA All-Star (1983, 1984); 2× Southland Player of the Year (1978, 1980)

Career statistics
- Points: 7,458 (15.9 ppg)
- Rebounds: 1,009 (2.2 rpg)
- Assists: 1,965 (4.2 apg)
- Stats at NBA.com
- Stats at Basketball Reference

Andrew Toney (born November 23, 1957) is an American former professional basketball player in the National Basketball Association (NBA). Bob Ryan of The Boston Globe called Toney "the most forgotten great player in NBA history". Toney played for the NBA's Philadelphia 76ers from 1980 to 1988. He was selected by the 76ers with the eighth overall pick in the 1980 NBA draft. He was known as "the Boston Strangler" for his exceptional play in the playoffs against the Boston Celtics. A two-time NBA All-Star, he won an NBA championship with the 76ers in 1983. His NBA career field goal percentage of 50 percent is remarkable for a guard often shooting from distance.

Contemporary basketball greats Larry Bird and Sidney Moncrief put Toney on par with Michael Jordan offensively. But for career ending chronic foot injuries, it was widely believed by his contemporaries that he would have been selected to the Naismith Basketball Hall of Fame. Teammate Julius Erving said after Toney led the 76ers to a Game 7 win over the Boston Celtics in the 1982 NBA Eastern Conference finals, "'There is no legal way to stop Andrew Toney'".

Toney was an All-American as a junior and senior at Glenn High School in Birmingham, Alabama; averaging over 30 points per game both years. As a senior, he was selected as Alabama's "Mr. Basketball". He was team captain his senior year, and agreed to Sandra Murray's joining the boys' basketball team. She sometimes started with him in the backcourt.

Toney attended the University of Southwestern Louisiana (now the University of Louisiana at Lafayette). He averaged 23.6 points per game during his college career. He led the team to the 1977 Southland Conference championship. Toney was twice named the Southland Conference Player of the Year (1978, 1980). He was selected first-team All-Southland Conference in 1978, 1979, and 1980; leading the conference in scoring average all three of those seasons. As a senior, he led Southwestern Louisiana to a 21–9 record, reaching the National Invitation Tournament quarterfinals. Toney set nine school records at Southwestern Louisiana and scored 46 points in a game three times. He had 2,526 total career points, 13th highest in NCAA history at the time his college career ended. Toney obtained his undergraduate degree after 3½ years, and immediately began graduate studies.

In 2015, Toney was honored by the Georgia State Senate for his community work as a lead program coordinator in the Gwinnett County Public School system's academic support department, playing a major role in its mentoring program pairing African American middle and high school boys with male mentors.

== Early life ==
Toney was born on November 23, 1957, in Birmingham, Alabama, where his father Earnest James Toney, from whom Toney learned dedication, was a steelworker. His parents always preached academics over athletics to him.

Toney attended Birmingham's Glenn High School. On the basketball team, he averaged 31 points per game as a junior and 37 points per game as a senior. He once scored 68 points in a regional tournament game. He was named Alabama's “Mr. Basketball” as a senior, and was named to All-America teams as a junior and a senior. He was also All-Southern, All-State, All-City and All-District as a junior and senior. The team was 80–14 with Toney. He also played baseball and participated in track. As a youth, he idolized future teammate Julius "Dr. J." Erving.

As a senior, Toney was team captain, playing guard. Another teammate, who would sometimes start at guard with Toney, was Sandra Murray. It was extremely unusual to have a girl playing on the boys' team, and before coach Hansell Gunn would agree to her joining the team, he told Murray she would have to obtain approval of the other players. Murray went to Toney as team captain, and they worked out Murray's playing on the team; Toney telling Murray that if he agreed to it the other players would as well.

== College ==
Toney attended the University of Southwestern Louisiana (now the University of Louisiana at Lafayette), graduating ahead of time in 3½ years and starting graduate school in his final semester. He played basketball under coaches Jim Hatfield and Bobby Paschal in the Southland Conference; Paschal observing Toney's extraordinary self-discipline and ability to focus in setting and achieving goals.

Toney averaged 21 points per game as a freshman, leading the team in scoring and ranking third in the Southland Conference. Toney averaged 24.5 points per game as a sophomore, leading the Southland Conference. He also led the conference in total points (661), field goal attempts (468), free throws attempted (179), and free throws made (137). He was named Southland Conference Player of the Year in 1977–78. As a junior (1978–79), Toney led the Southland Conference in scoring average again (23.3 points per game). He averaged 26.1 points as a senior (1979–80), leading the Southland Conference for a third consecutive season; and was named Southland Conference Player of the Year for the second time.

In 1977, Toney led Southwestern Louisiana to the Southland Conference title. As a senior, he led Southwestern Louisiana to a 21–9 record, going as far as the National Invitation Tournament quarterfinals. He was first-team All-Southland Conference in 1978, 1979, and 1980. He set nine school records, and scored 46 points in a game three times, including a game against Auburn to win the Bayou Class Championship.

Over his 107-game college career, Toney averaged 23.6 points, 3.7 assists, and 3.2 rebounds per game. He finished his college career with 2,526 points, 13th highest in NCAA history at the time. Foreshadowing his reputation in the NBA, after winning a game during his junior year against University of Nevada-Reno, 73–71, by making two free throws with only seconds left, Toney said "'I like pressure situations. ... They build up my blood'".

== Professional career ==
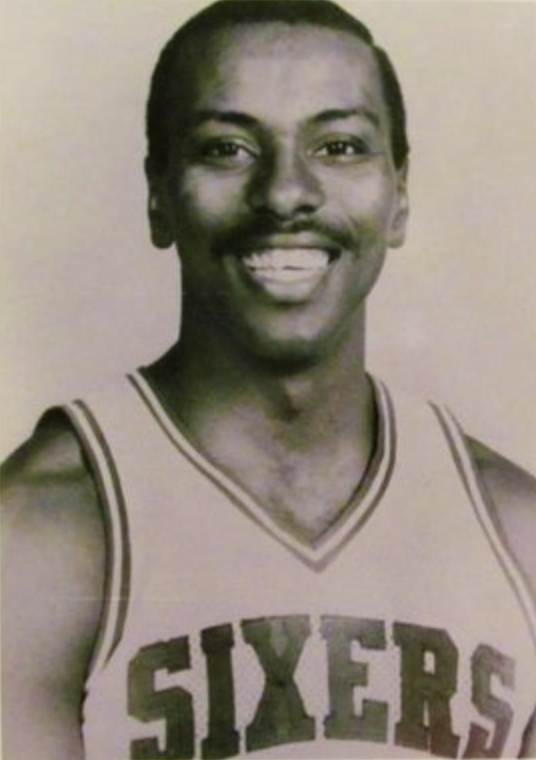
Toney played for the 76ers from 1980 to 1988

=== Philadelphia 76ers (1980 to 1985) ===
Toney was drafted by the Philadelphia 76ers out of Southwestern Louisiana with the eighth pick of the 1980 NBA draft. On arriving in Philadelphia, future Hall of Famer Julius Erving took Toney under his wing.

As a rookie (1980–81), Toney averaged 12.9 points and 3.6 assists per game in only 23.6 minutes per game. Toney had a .495 field goal percentage and was seventh in rookie of the year voting. In early November, only 12 games into the season, starting shooting guard Doug Collins suffered a recurrent stress fracture in his foot (and would never play again in the NBA). The same condition would end Toney's career eight years later.

Toney then became the starter at shooting guard as a rookie, starting in 57 games that year playing next to point guard Maurice Cheeks (with Lionel Hollins also playing significant amounts of time at guard that season). Toney averaged 23 minutes, 12.5 points, and six assists per game in the 76ers two-game sweep of the Indiana Pacers in the first round of the 1981 NBA playoffs. In the 76ers seven-game series win over the Milwaukee Bucks in the 1981 Eastern Conference semifinals, he only averaged 18.7 minutes per game, while Hollins played 30.3 minutes per game.

Toney's vaunted play against the Boston Celtics began in his rookie season. In the final regular season game of 1981, Toney came off the bench against the Celtics to play 33 minutes and score 35 points. In the first game of the 1981 Eastern Conference finals between the 76ers and the Celtics, he had 26 points. After that game, Dick Weiss of the Philadelphia Daily News referred to Toney taking over Lloyd Free's role as the "Boston strangler". Toney then scored 35 points in Game 2; both of which games were played in Boston. The Sixers were up 3–1 in the series, but the Celtics held Toney to only 17 points in the final two games and took the series. Overall in the series against the Celtics, Toney averaged 19.1 points, 3.7 rebounds, and three assists per game in only 25.6 minutes per game.

In the 1981–82 season, the 76ers started two point guards, Cheeks and Hollins, with Toney coming off the bench. Toney averaged 24.8 minutes, 16.5 points, and 3.7 assists per game during the regular season. In a nationally televised game on March 7, 1982, coming into the game off the bench and playing 35 minutes, Toney scored 46 points against the Los Angeles Lakers and Hall of Fame defensive specialist Michael Cooper. The 76ers swept the Atlanta Hawks in two games during the first round of the 1982 NBA playoffs. Toney averaged 27.5 minutes, 14.5 points, three assists and two rebounds per game. Toney's playing time increased during the ensuing playoff series that year after Hollins broke his own hand punching the Hawks' Wayne "Tree" Rollins in Game 2. Toney had been taken out of the game with a sprained ankle, but had to return after Hollins was injured.

The 76ers then defeated the Milwaukee Bucks in the 1982 Eastern Conference semifinals in six games. Toney, now starting, averaged 31.5 minutes, 19.5 points, three assists, and 1.7 rebounds per game. He had 26 points in the 76ers Game 1 victory, and 31 points in the 76ers Game 2 win. The 76ers then went on to play the Boston Celtics in the 1982 Eastern Conference finals, winning that series in seven games. Toney led the 76ers in scoring against the Celtics, averaging 22.1 points in 33.7 minutes per game. Toney had 30 points in the 76ers Game 2 win, and 39 points in the 76ers Game 4 win.

Toney was dubbed "the Boston Strangler" by Boston sportswriters during the 76ers' and Celtics' rivalry in the early 1980s because of his ability to single-handedly dominate games against the Celtics. While his playoff career points per game average was 17.4 overall, against the Celtics it was 19.8. Most famously in Toney's history against the Celtics, in Game 7 of the 1982 Eastern Conference finals, played in Boston, Toney scored 34 points in the 76ers 120–106 victory over the Celtics.

The 76ers had a 3–1 series lead in 1982, but lost Games 5 and 6, with Toney playing poorly in Game 6 (scoring only three points). The 76ers and Toney came into Game 7 determined to prove they were not "chokers". His teammates made efforts before the game to affirm Toney's usual confidence in his abilities. Toney scored 13 of his 34 points in the fourth quarter, despite being unsuccessfully double- and triple-teamed, physically hit by the Celtics, and covered by a variety of Celtics (including even Larry Bird). Toney also resisted the temptation to be drawn into retaliation or a fight by the Celtics' physical tactics; and played 43 minutes in the game. Game 7 ended with the Celtics crowd shockingly chanting for the rival 76ers to "Beat L.A."

Celtic guard M. L. Carr, who had to play against Toney during the teams' rivalry, said Toney's passing made him even more impossible to guard, and that "'In his offensive game . . . there were no faults at all". Carr called Toney "'the best when it came to undressing a defensive player'". He added "There was only one way I ever found to stop him. You got him away from the ball, made sure no referee was looking, then laid a forearm to his face'". Carr admitted years later, "'I shouldn’t say this, but my goal was to get him out of the game with a hit . . . That’s what I was trying to do all the time'". After the 76ers Game 7 win over the Celtics in 1982, Erving said in the winning locker room "'There is no legal way to stop Andrew Toney'".

The Los Angeles Lakers won the 1982 NBA Finals over the 76ers in six games. Toney averaged a team-leading 26 points per game, to go along with 7.8 assists and 2.7 rebounds per game, a .529 field goal percentage, .750 three-point field goal percentage, and .862 free throw percentage in that series. Toney had 36 points in a Game 3 loss, 28 points, 11 assists, and five rebounds in a Game 4 loss; 31 points and eight assists in a Game 5 win; and 29 points and six assists in Game 6.

The following season (1982–83), the 76ers won the NBA championship. Toney was an integral part of the 1982–83 76ers championship team, alongside teammates Julius Erving, Moses Malone, Bobby Jones and Maurice Cheeks, all Hall of Famers. Toney was selected to play in the 1983 NBA All-Star Game, along with Cheeks, Malone and Erving. Toney started 81 regular season games, playing 30.5 minutes per game. He averaged 19.7 points, 4.5 assists, and 2.8 rebounds per game. The 76ers swept the New York Knicks in four games in the 1983 Eastern Conference semifinals. Toney had a thigh injury that limited his play during that series; appearing in only three games and averaging only 20 minutes per game.

Toney played in all five games of the 1983 Eastern Conference finals against the Milwaukee Bucks. The 76ers won the series in five games, with Toney as the team's leading scorer in the series (22.2 points per game). He had 30 points, seven assists, and five rebounds in the series clinching Game 5. The 76ers then swept the Lakers in four games in the 1983 NBA finals. Toney averaged 22 points, 5.8 assists, and 2.3 rebounds per game in the championship series. 76ers coach Billy Cunningham said about the 1983 championship team that Toney "just had unlimited abilities . . . Of all the players on that team, Andrew Toney sacrificed more than anyone. Winning was the most important thing to him so therefore he would do whatever was necessary'".

After the 1982–83 season, the Celtics traded for big defensive guard, and future Hall of Famer, Dennis Johnson, in significant part to try and defend Toney (and Magic Johnson).

Toney was named an All-Star again in 1984. During the 1983–84 season, he averaged 32.8 minutes, 20.4 points, 4.8 assists, and 2.5 rebounds per game. The 76ers lost to the New Jersey Nets in five games in the first round of the 1984 NBA playoffs; though Toney averaged 20.6 points per game. In 1984–85, Toney appeared in the fewest regular season games of his NBA career up to that time (70), while averaging 32 minutes, 17.8 points, 5.2 assists, and 2.5 rebounds per game. His 76ers teammates that season included rookie Charles Barkley. In December 1984, the 76ers signed Toney to a seven-year contract worth somewhere between $4.73 million and $6 million.

Toney suffered a sprained ankle early in the 1984–85 season. In April 1985, late in the season, he was placed on the injured list with a sprained left ankle. Toney had also complained of pain in his feet during the 1984–85 season, and later stated that the team lacked due concern in allowing Toney to keep playing without addressing the pain in his feet. It has been stated that the 76ers' doctors cleared Toney to play, despite his expressions of pain. In November 1985, he was finally diagnosed with stress fractures in both feet. Toney believed that the 76ers were accusing him of being a malingerer, rather than actually suffering from any physical problem with his feet during the 1984–85 season.

Toney later stated that he participated in the 1985 NBA playoffs under pressure from team management. He averaged 33 minutes, 17.5 points, 3.8 assists, and 2.5 rebounds in the first round of the 1985 NBA playoffs. The 76ers swept the Bucks in the next round (4–0), with Toney averaging 34.5 minutes, 15.3 points, 7.3 assists, and 2.5 rebounds per game. The 76ers lost to the Celtics in the Eastern Conference finals in five games. Toney averaged 34.4 minutes, 17.6 points, 4.4 assists, and 2.4 rebounds per game. Toney was less aggressive as a scorer in that series compared to past series against the Celtics, and Naismith Basketball Hall of Fame Philadelphia Daily News sportswriter Phil Jasner wrote an article during the series entitled "Boston Strangler Might Be Only a Memory".

After the 1984–85 season ended, Toney was subjected to the indignity of having two NBA employees camp outside his house all night, and then come to his door at 7:00 a.m. to insist he take a drug test, based on unsubstantiated rumors. Toney passed the test but believed the 76ers were behind it, which both the 76ers and NBA denied. The relationship between Toney and the 76ers continued to deteriorate in the ensuing years. The drug testing and ongoing dispute over his physical condition all led to years of bitterness between Toney and 76ers management, though he and team owner Harold Katz significantly improved their relationship and renewed contact with each other over time. Some distance has continued between Toney and the 76ers into the 21st century.

After the 1984–85 season, Toney's physical health declined and his career would be cut short after eight seasons by chronic foot injuries. He only had five relatively healthy NBA seasons during his career.

=== Stress fracture controversy (1985 to 1989) ===
Toney's left ankle was placed in a cast during part of summer before the 1985–86 season began, to address an ankle sprain; but he reportedly still had soreness in both ankles going into the season and missed most of training camp. He played in the season's first three games, respectively playing 22, 14, and seven minutes in those games. After the first two games, he was described as limping around on two sprained ankles.

In early November Toney was diagnosed with a stress fracture in his right foot. He was ultimately diagnosed that November with stress fractures of the tarsal navicular bones in both his right and left feet. Toney also had surgery for bone spurs in his left ankle in late November 1985. It has been stated that Toney used the services of a private independent physician, and that doctor was the one who finally diagnosed the stress fractures. Toney briefly attempted to come back for two games in mid-February 1986, but was in too much pain to continue playing.

In late March 1986, the 76ers' team doctors said Toney was capable of playing, despite any pain he might experience, and Toney responded that the level of pain he was in would prevent him from being able to play. 76ers owner Harold Katz and Toney publicly criticized each other in the media at different times. Katz threatened to suspend Toney without pay if he did not play. Under Katz's threat, Toney played 13 minutes in a game against the Milwaukee Bucks on March 28, and did not play again that season. One reporter at the time described Toney's play in the game: "Throughout his 13 minutes on the court, he moved at about half speed, as if . . . the floor consisted of eggshells".

The debate over Toney's status was divisive in Philadelphia. Katz was subjected to criticism in the media, from Toney's teammates, and from other NBA players (such as Bill Walton). The normally quiet Moses Malone said that he believed Toney if Toney said he was in too much pain to play; and that the issue should never have become public (though Katz blamed Toney for publicizing it, and vice versa). Julius Erving said of Katz's behavior "'That's not the way I do my business'". Charles Barkley later stated he saw how much pain Toney was in when even taking just one step.

The team's treatment of Toney was considered by some especially troubling because Toney had been a model citizen for the team as well as an integral player in their success. Award-winning Philadelphia sportswriter and author Bill Lyon said at the time "By giving him their crude ultimatum, the Sixers have treated a valued employee with unconscionable shabbiness"; and posited that instead the 76ers should have apologized for the team's mistake in having played Toney the prior season with broken feet and at the risk of permanent damage.

After undergoing surgeries on his broken feet, and a number of ongoing conflicts with 76ers management, Toney played in only 81 games over his last two seasons. Toney returned to play in 52 games during the 1986–87 season. He averaged 20.3 minutes, 10.6 points, and 3.6 assists per game. The 76ers lost in the first round of the 1987 Eastern Conference playoffs to the Bucks in five games. Toney played in all five games, averaging 20.8 minutes, 5.6 points, and 5.4 assists per game. He played 29 games for the 76ers the following season (1987–88) from November 13, 1987, to February 27, 1988; averaging only 18 minutes per game. Toney did not report to training camp before the 1988–89 season, was suspended by the 76ers, and then retired in February 1989, unable to play on his damaged feet. Toney's Celtic nemesis M.L. Carr said in 1991, "'It never should have happened like this . . . Andrew should have had a 12-year career, should have been a Hall of Famer'".

During his NBA career, Toney averaged 15.9 points, 4.2 assists, and 2.2 rebounds per game. He ranked second in the NBA in three-point field goal percentage in 1981–82 (.424) and sixth in 1984–85 (.371). His lifetime field goal percentage is 50 percent; remarkable for a guard often shooting from distance.

== Legacy ==
Bob Ryan of The Boston Globe called Toney "the most forgotten great player in NBA history". Hall of Fame player and Toney's former coach Billy Cunningham believed Toney would have been in the Hall of Fame but for his injuries, and that Toney and backcourt mate Cheeks had just started to grow into their potential together. Julius Erving believed Toney was a Hall of Fame caliber player. Hall of Fame teammate Charles Barkley stated that Toney was the best player he ever played with.

Hall of Fame Celtics opponent Larry Bird, a member of the NBA 75th Anniversary Team, praised Toney as one of two shooting guards of whom he was most afraid. The other was Michael Jordan. Hall of Fame Milwaukee Bucks guard Sidney Moncrief, who won the very first Defensive Player of the Year Award in 1983, and who had to defend Toney, said "'Toney was un-guardable . . . he could do everything . . . I studied him, and it’s nothing you could do that could stop him from scoring, beyond double-teaming him and getting the ball out of his hands'". He also found Toney very smart, with a counter for whatever the defender tried. Moncrief "'always put [Toney] right there with Michael [Jordan]'". After the 1983 championship series with the Lakers, Hall of Fame Laker coach Pat Riley said "'Toney is probably the toughest clutch shooter in the league today .... He is just impervious to pressure'".

Pat Williams, the 76ers general manager during the 1982–83 championship season and later vice president of basketball operations for the Orlando Magic, shared an anecdote with Tony Rizzo while being interviewed on The Really Big Show on ESPN850 WKNR in Cleveland on February 11, 2010. Williams said that when he was a general manager back in the days of the Celtics' great rivalry with the Lakers and 76ers (c. 1980–1983), he asked Danny Ainge, the Celtics guard, what player he worried about the most come playoff time. "Not Magic or Dr. J, it's Andrew Toney that keeps me awake at night!" said Ainge. Williams went on to say that were it not for injuries Toney would have been a Hall of Famer. Ainge later said the Celtics as a team feared Toney more than Erving or Malone, and that "'I wouldn’t say he had as good a career as the Isiah Thomases and the Magic Johnsons or the Michael Jordans or the guys like that, but you certainly prepared for him equally, because he was capable of having a special game against you at any time'".

Toney was so difficult to cover defensively when holding the ball on the wing, with the ability to shoot or drive, that during games the 76ers bench players would shout "torture chamber" at the opposing player attempting to defend Toney.

== Honors ==
In 1992, Toney was inducted into the Louisiana Sports Hall of Fame. In 2013, he was inducted into the Philadelphia Sports Hall of Fame. In 2016, Toney was inducted into the Alabama Sports Hall of Fame.

In one NBA ranking of the greatest backcourt duos in league history, Toney and Maurice Cheeks were ranked eleventh out of seventy pairs.

In September 1983, the city of Lafayette, Louisiana held an Andrew Toney Day, and the University of Southwestern Louisiana established a scholarship in his name.

== NBA career statistics ==
Legend
GP	Games played	GS	Games started	MPG	Minutes per game
FG%	Field goal percentage	3P%	3-point field goal percentage	FT%	Free throw percentage
RPG	Rebounds per game	APG	Assists per game	SPG	Steals per game
BPG	Blocks per game	PPG	Points per game	**Bold**	Career high
†	Won an NBA championship

=== Regular season ===
Year	Team	GP	GS	MPG	FG%	3P%	FT%	RPG	APG	SPG	BPG	PPG
1980–81	Philadelphia	75	—	23.6	.495	.310	.712	1.9	3.6	.8	.1	12.9
1981–82	Philadelphia	77	1	24.8	.522	**.424**	.742	1.7	3.7	.8	.2	16.5
1982–83†	Philadelphia	**81**	**81**	30.5	.501	.289	.788	**2.8**	4.5	**1.0**	.2	19.7
1983–84	Philadelphia	78	72	**32.8**	**.527**	.316	.839	2.5	4.8	.9	**.3**	**20.4**
1984–85	Philadelphia	70	65	32.0	.492	.371	**.862**	2.5	**5.2**	.9	**.3**	17.8
1985–86	Philadelphia	6	0	14.0	.306	.000	.375	.8	2.0	.3	.0	4.2
1986–87	Philadelphia	52	12	20.3	.451	.328	.796	1.6	3.6	.3	.2	10.6
1987–88	Philadelphia	29	15	18.0	.421	.333	.806	1.6	3.7	.4	.2	7.3
Career		468	246	26.9	.500	.342	.797	2.2	4.2	.8	.2	15.9
All-Star		2	0	20.0	.625	.000	1.000	.5	5.0	2.0	.0	10.5

=== Playoffs ===
Year	Team	GP	GS	MPG	FG%	3P%	FT%	RPG	APG	SPG	BPG	PPG
1981	Philadelphia	16	—	22.3	.428	.111	.815	2.3	3.4	.7	**.4**	13.8
1982	Philadelphia	**21**	—	33.7	.507	.333	.796	2.4	4.9	**.9**	.1	**21.8**
1983†	Philadelphia	12	—	29.8	.470	.000	.754	2.3	4.6	**.9**	.1	18.8
1984	Philadelphia	5	—	**36.0**	**.519**	.000	.767	2.2	3.8	.8	.2	20.6
1985	Philadelphia	13	**13**	34.0	.477	**.429**	.770	**2.5**	5.1	**.9**	**.4**	16.8
1987	Philadelphia	5	0	20.8	.382	.000	**1.000**	1.8	**5.4**	.4	**.4**	5.6
Career		72	13	29.8	.478	.235	.786	2.3	4.5	.8	.3	17.4

== Personal life ==
Toney lives outside of Atlanta and worked as an elementary-school teacher, and he then took on positions as instructional coach for the Gwinnett County Schools' Community-Based Mentoring Program and with Project Reconnect. In 2015, Toney was honored by the Georgia State Senate for his community work as a lead program coordinator in the Gwinnett Public School system's academic support department, playing a major role in its mentoring program pairing African American middle and high school boys with male mentors. Toney's wife Priscilla Toney (who died in 2016) also attended Southwestern Louisiana and worked as a public elementary school teacher in Gwinnett County for over 25 years, and as an assistant principal. She was named Teacher of the Year in 2004, and had a profound impact on thousands of children and their parents.

Toney has a son and two daughters. Toney's son Channing played NCAA Division I basketball at the University of Georgia and the University of Alabama at Birmingham and played a few matches professionally in Poland with Asseco Prokom Gdynia. He also won the second-tier Finnish Division I championship with Bisons Loimaa.

Toney served as a part-time scout for Billy Cunningham and the Miami Heat in the early 1990s.
