= 1984–85 Boston Celtics season =

NBA basketball team season

- Conference champions
- Division champions
- Head coach: K. C. Jones
- General manager: Jan Volk
- Owners: Don Gaston; Alan N. Cohen; Paul Dupee
- Arena: Boston Garden; Hartford Civic Center

Results
- Record: 63–19 (.768)
- Place: Division: 1st (Atlantic); Conference: 1st (Eastern)
- Playoff finish: NBA Finals (lost to Lakers 2–4)
- Stats at Basketball Reference

Local media
- Television: WBZ-TV (Gil Santos, Bob Cousy); SportsChannel New England (Mike Gorman, Tom Heinsohn)
- Radio: WRKO (Johnny Most, Glenn Ordway)

The 1984–85 Boston Celtics season was the 39th season of the Boston Celtics in the National Basketball Association (NBA). The Celtics entered the season as the defending NBA Champions, coming off an NBA Finals victory over the Los Angeles Lakers in seven games, and increasing their NBA Finals victories over the Lakers to 8.

On March 3, 1985, Kevin McHale surpassed Larry Bird's Celtics single game scoring record when he netted 56 points against the Detroit Pistons. Less than two weeks later, on March 12, Bird answered, scoring a career-high 60 points against the Atlanta Hawks.

In the playoffs, the Celtics defeated the Cleveland Cavaliers in the First Round in four games, the Detroit Pistons in the Semi-finals in six games, and the Philadelphia 76ers in the conference finals in five games to advance to the NBA Finals. In the Finals, they faced off against the Los Angeles Lakers, the team who they beat in last season's NBA Finals in seven games, and have beaten a total of 8 consecutive times in their NBA Finals matchups. However, the Celtics were defeated in six games by the Lakers, marking the first time the Celtics were defeated by the Lakers in the NBA Finals. This also marked the first time the Celtics lost the NBA Finals at home.

== Trivia ==
A majority of this team moved onto coaching later in their careers. Kevin McHale, Rick Carlisle, Larry Bird, Danny Ainge, Dennis Johnson, and Sam Vincent have all coached in the NBA.

== Draft picks ==
Round	Pick	Player	Position	Nationality	College
1	24	Michael Young	SF/SG	United States	Houston
2	47	Ronnie Williams		United States	Florida
3	70	Rick Carlisle	G	United States	Virginia
4	93	Kevin Mullin		United States	Princeton
5	116	Todd Orlando		United States	Bentley
6	139	Steve Carfino	G	United States	Iowa
7	162	Mark Van Valkenburg		United States	Framingham State
8	184	Champ Godboldt		United States	Holy Cross
9	206	Joe Dixon		United States	Merrimack
10	228	Dan Trant		United States	Clark

== Roster ==
1984–85 Boston Celtics roster
Players

Pos.	No.	Player	Height	Weight	DOB	From
G/F	44	Danny Ainge	6 ft 4 in (1.93 m)	175 lb (79 kg)		BYU
F	33	Larry Bird	6 ft 9 in (2.06 m)	220 lb (100 kg)		Indiana State
G	28	Quinn Buckner	6 ft 3 in (1.91 m)	190 lb (86 kg)		Indiana
G	34	Rick Carlisle	6 ft 5 in (1.96 m)	210 lb (95 kg)		Virginia
G/F	30	M.L. Carr	6 ft 6 in (1.98 m)	205 lb (93 kg)		Guilford
G	40	Carlos Clark	6 ft 4 in (1.93 m)	210 lb (95 kg)		Mississippi
G	3	Dennis Johnson	6 ft 4 in (1.93 m)	185 lb (84 kg)		Pepperdine
C	50	Greg Kite	6 ft 11 in (2.11 m)	250 lb (113 kg)		BYU
F	31	Cedric Maxwell	6 ft 8 in (2.03 m)	205 lb (93 kg)		Charlotte
F/C	32	Kevin McHale	6 ft 10 in (2.08 m)	210 lb (95 kg)		Minnesota
C	00	Robert Parish	7 ft 0 in (2.13 m)	230 lb (104 kg)		Centenary
G/F	8	Scott Wedman	6 ft 7 in (2.01 m)	215 lb (98 kg)		Colorado
G	20	Ray Williams	6 ft 3 in (1.91 m)	188 lb (85 kg)		Minnesota

Coaches
Head coach
- K. C. Jones
Assistant(s)
- Ed Badger
- Chris Ford
- Jimmy Rodgers

Legend
- (DP) Unsigned draft pick
- (FA) Free agent
- (S) Suspended
- Injured

Roster

== Regular season ==
=== Season standings ===
Atlantic Division	W	L	PCT	GB	Home	Road	Div
y-Boston Celtics	63	19	.768	–	35–6	28–13	19–5
x-Philadelphia 76ers	58	24	.707	5	34–7	24–17	15–9
x-New Jersey Nets	42	40	.512	21	27–14	15–26	13–11
x-Washington Bullets	40	42	.488	23	28–13	12–29	11–13
New York Knicks	24	58	.293	39	19–22	5–36	2–22

#	Eastern Conference				
#	Team	W	L	PCT	GB
1	z-Boston Celtics	63	19	.768	–
2	y-Milwaukee Bucks	59	23	.720	4
3	x-Philadelphia 76ers	58	24	.707	5
4	x-Detroit Pistons	46	36	.561	17
5	x-New Jersey Nets	42	40	.512	21
6	x-Washington Bullets	40	42	.488	23
7	x-Chicago Bulls	38	44	.463	25
8	x-Cleveland Cavaliers	36	46	.439	27
9	Atlanta Hawks	34	48	.415	29
10	New York Knicks	24	58	.293	39
11	Indiana Pacers	22	60	.268	41

=== Game log ===
1984–85 game log
Total: 63–19 (home: 35–6; road: 28–13)
October: 2–0 (home: 1–0; road: 1–0)

Game	Date	Team	Score	High points	High rebounds	High assists	Location Attendance	Record
1	October 26	@ Detroit	W 130–123	Bird (33)	McHale (15)	Johnson (9)	Pontiac Silverdome; 27,563	1–0
2	October 31	New Jersey	W 116–105	Bird (29)	McHale, Parish (15)	Bird (8)	Boston Garden; 14,890	2–0

November: 11–1 (home: 6–0; road: 5–1)

Game	Date	Team	Score	High points	High rebounds	High assists	Location Attendance	Record
3	November 2	Detroit	W 127–116	Bird (34)	Parish, Johnson (10)	Johnson (7)	Boston Garden; 14,890	3–0
4	November 7	L.A. Clippers	W 135–108	Bird (31)	Bird (14)	Johnson (12)	Boston Garden; 14,890	4–0
5	November 9	Philadelphia	W 130–119	Bird (42)	Maxwell, McHale (8)	Ainge (12)	Boston Garden; 14,890	5–0
6	November 10	@ Washington	L 95–112	Bird (18)	Parish (10)	Ainge (4)	Capital Centre; 14,395	5–1
7	November 12	@ Indiana	W 132–115	Bird (29)	Bird (9)	Ainge (9)	Market Square Arena; 13,876	6–1
8	November 14	New York	W 115–99	Bird (29)	McHale (11)	Bird (7)	Boston Garden; 14,890	7–1
9	November 15	@ Chicago	W 125–105	McHale (25)	Parish, Bird (17)	Johnson (7)	Chicago Stadium; 17,753	8–1
10	November 21	Golden State	W 135–91	Parish (18)	McHale (8)	Johnson (7)	Boston Garden; 14,890	9–1
11	November 23	Washington	W 118–110	Bird (29)	Bird (13)	Johnson (8)	Boston Garden; 14,890	10–1
12	November 24	@ Kansas City	W 135–124	Parish (28)	Bird (13)	Bird (7)	Kemper Arena; 17,341	11–1
13	November 27	@ Dallas	W 114–99	Bird (40)	McHale (12)	Bird (9)	Reunion Arena; 17,007	12–1
14	November 28	@ Houston	W 110–100	Bird (23)	Parish (11)	Bird (9)	The Summit; 16,016	13–1

December: 13–5 (home: 6–1; road: 7–4)

Game	Date	Team	Score	High points	High rebounds	High assists	Location Attendance	Record
15	December 1	@ Cleveland	W 110–104	Bird (34)	Parish (16)	Johnson (9)	Richfield Coliseum; 12,503	14–1
16	December 2	Cleveland	W 122–99	Bird (23)	Maxwell (9)	Bird (5)	Boston Garden; 14,890	15–1
17	December 4	@ Detroit	L 99–104	Johnson (25)	Bird (17)	Bird, Ainge (7)	Pontiac Silverdome; 19,413	15–2
18	December 5	Denver	W 123–107	Parish (25)	Bird (12)	Johnson (7)	Boston Garden; 14,890	16–2
19	December 8	@ New Jersey	W 107–98	Bird (37)	Parish (18)	Johnson (8)	Brendan Byrne Arena; 15,581	17–2
20	December 9	Atlanta	W 128–127	Bird (48)	Bird (14)	Ainge (11)	Boston Garden; 14,890	18–2
21	December 11	New Jersey	W 130–121	Bird (35)	Parish (11)	Bird, Johnson (10)	Hartford Civic Center; 13,357	19–2
22	December 12	@ Philadelphia	L 107–110	Bird (34)	Parish (15)	Ainge (11)	The Spectrum; 17,921	19–3
23	December 14	Utah	W 117–106	McHale (25)	Parish (17)	Johnson (7)	Boston Garden; 14,890	20–3
24	December 15	@ Atlanta	W 101–94	Bird (23)	Parish (15)	Bird (6)	The Omni; 11,808	21–3
25	December 18	@ New York	W 126–108	Bird (23)	Bird (15)	Johnson (12)	Madison Square Garden; 16,798	22–3
26	December 19	Milwaukee	L 92–107	Bird, Johnson (18)	Bird (9)	Johnson, Ainge (4)	Boston Garden; 14,890	22–4
27	December 21	Indiana	W 117–107	Bird (33)	Parish (9)	Bird (9)	Boston Garden; 14,890	23–4
28	December 22	@ Chicago	L 85–110	Ainge (16)	Parish (11)	Ainge (5)	Chicago Stadium; 14,414	23–5
29	December 26	@ Phoenix	W 119–114	Bird (34)	Bird (11)	Bird (10)	Arizona Veterans Memorial Coliseum; 14,660	24–5
30	December 27	@ L.A. Clippers	W 118–103	McHale (27)	Bird (13)	Bird (13)	Los Angeles Memorial Sports Arena; 15,371	25–5
31	December 29	@ San Antonio	W 120–112	McHale (26)	Bird (15)	Bird (10)	HemisFair Arena; 15,180	26–5
32	December 30	@ Milwaukee	L 98–114	Bird, McHale (24)	Bird, Parish (14)	Ainge (7)	MECCA Arena; 11,052	26–6

January: 11–3 (home: 8–1; road: 3–2)

Game	Date	Team	Score	High points	High rebounds	High assists	Location Attendance	Record
33	January 2	@ New Jersey	W 110–95	Bird (23)	Parish (13)	Bird (10)	Brendan Byrne Arena; 14,496	27–6
34	January 4	New York	W 105–94	Bird (32)	Parish (12)	Johnson (7)	Boston Garden; 14,890	28–6
35	January 7	@ New York	W 108–97	Bird (26)	Parish (11)	Johnson (12)	Madison Square Garden; 14,600	29–6
36	January 9	Chicago	W 111–108	Bird (28)	Bird (11)	Johnson (6)	Boston Garden; 14,890	30–6
37	January 11	Washington	W 103–101	Bird (33)	Parish (16)	Johnson (11)	Boston Garden; 14,890	31–6
38	January 12	@ Atlanta	W 119–111	Ainge (25)	Parish (13)	Johnson (9)	The Omni; 16,048	32–6
39	January 16	L.A. Lakers	W 104–102	Johnson (20)	Parish (13)	Ainge, Bird, Johnson (7)	Boston Garden; 14,890	33–6
40	January 18	@ Indiana	L 86–91	Bird (25)	Bird (12)	Johnson (7)	Market Square Arena; 16,920	33–7
41	January 20	Philadelphia	W 113–97	Bird (38)	Bird, McHale (9)	Johnson (9)	Boston Garden; 14,890	34–7
42	January 23	Seattle	L 97–107	Bird (30)	Parish, McHale (8)	Bird (6)	Boston Garden; 14,890	34–8
43	January 25	Indiana	W 125–94	Parish (27)	Bird (11)	Ainge (6)	Boston Garden; 14,890	35–8
44	January 27	Portland	W 128–127	Bird (48)	Parish (12)	Johnson (10)	Boston Garden; 14,890	36–8
45	January 29	Detroit	W 131–130	Bird (32)	Johnson (11)	Ainge (7)	Hartford Civic Center; 15,685	37–8
46	January 30	@ Philadelphia	L 104–122	Johnson (20)	Parish (8)	Bird (8)	The Spectrum; 17,921	37–9

February: 10–3 (home: 4–0; road: 6–3)

Game	Date	Team	Score	High points	High rebounds	High assists	Location Attendance	Record
47	February 1	Kansas City	W 142–123	Bird (38)	Bird (11)	Johnson (13)	Boston Garden; 14,890	38–9
48	February 2	@ Washington	W 97–91	Bird (21)	Bird, Parish (12)	Bird, Johnson (8)	Capital Centre; 19,105	39–9
49	February 5	@ Chicago	W 110–106	Bird (27)	Bird (9)	Bird, Johnson (7)	Chicago Stadium; 18,061	40–9
50	February 6	Cleveland	W 113–108	Bird (26)	Parish, Bird (11)	Ainge (6)	Boston Garden; 14,890	41–9
All-Star Break
51	February 12	@ Portland	L 103–111	Bird (25)	Bird (11)	Johnson (9)	Memorial Coliseum; 12,666	41–10
52	February 14	@ Seattle	W 110–94	McHale (26)	Bird (13)	Johnson (10)	Kingdome; 13,509	42–10
53	February 15	@ Golden State	W 107–100	Bird (30)	Parish (22)	Johnson, Ainge, Bird (7)	Oakland-Alameda County Coliseum Arena; 13,295	43–10
54	February 17	@ L.A. Lakers	L 111–117	Bird (33)	Bird (15)	Ainge, Johnson (10)	The Forum; 17,505	43–11
55	February 18	@ Utah	W 110–94	Bird (30)	Bird (12)	Bird (10)	Salt Palace Acord Arena; 12,716	44–11
56	February 20	@ Denver	L 129–132	Bird (40)	Bird, McHale (9)	Bird, Ainge (6)	McNichols Sports Arena; 17,022	44–12
57	February 22	Chicago	W 115–105	Bird (34)	McHale, Parish (11)	Johnson (12)	Hartford Civic Center; 15,685	45–12
58	February 24	@ Indiana	W 113–100	Bird (45)	Parish (17)	Johnson (12)	Market Square Arena; 16,920	46–12
59	February 27	San Antonio	W 111–102	Bird (35)	Bird, McHale (14)	Ainge (12)	Boston Garden; 14,890	47–12

March: 12–3 (home: 7–2; road: 5–1)

Game	Date	Team	Score	High points	High rebounds	High assists	Location Attendance	Record
60	March 1	Atlanta	L 105–114	Bird (34)	McHale (11)	Johnson (9)	Boston Garden; 14,890	47–13
61	March 3	Detroit	W 138–129	McHale (56)	McHale (16)	Bird (10)	Boston Garden; 14,890	48–13
62	March 5	@ New York	W 110–102	McHale (42)	Bird (19)	Bird (10)	Madison Square Garden; 14,243	49–13
63	March 6	Chicago	L 104–107	Parish (26)	Parish (13)	Bird (10)	Boston Garden; 14,890	49–14
64	March 8	Dallas	W 133–122	Bird (32)	Bird (15)	Bird (9)	Boston Garden; 14,890	50–14
65	March 12	@ Atlanta	W 126–115	Bird (60)	Parish (19)	Johnson (17)	Lakefront Arena; 10,079	51–14
66	March 13	Phoenix	W 123–106	Bird (31)	Parish (14)	Bird (7)	Boston Garden; 14,890	52–14
67	March 15	@ Cleveland	W 119–96	Bird (35)	McHale (14)	Williams (6)	Richfield Coliseum; 20,900	53–14
68	March 17	Houston	W 134–120	Bird (48)	Bird (15)	Bird, Buckner (7)	Boston Garden; 14,890	54–14
69	March 20	Milwaukee	W 107–105	McHale (28)	Parish (19)	Bird (10)	Boston Garden; 14,890	53–14
70	March 22	Cleveland	W 129–117	Bird (36)	Parish (11)	Bird (15)	Boston Garden; 14,890	56–14
71	March 23	@ Washington	W 104–98	McHale (29)	Bird (12)	Bird (9)	Capital Centre; 19,015	57–14
72	March 27	@ New Jersey	W 105–95	McHale (23)	McHale (16)	Williams (6)	Brendan Byrne Arena; 18,333	58–14
73	March 29	Philadelphia	W 112–108	Bird (24)	McHale (13)	Johnson (8)	Boston Garden; 14,890	59–14
74	March 31	@ Detroit	L 105–113	Wedman (31)	Parish (14)	Wedman (5)	Joe Louis Arena; 22,136	59–15

April: 4–4 (home: 3–2; road: 1–2)

Game	Date	Team	Score	High points	High rebounds	High assists	Location Attendance	Record
75	April 2	@ Milwaukee	L 103–109	McHale (25)	McHale (12)	Johnson, Williams (7)	MECCA Arena; 11,052	59–16
76	April 3	Indiana	W 119–103	Bird (35)	Parish (13)	Bird, Williams (6)	Boston Garden; 14,890	60–16
77	April 5	Washington	W 115–104	Bird (26)	Bird (15)	Ainge (7)	Boston Garden; 14,890	61–16
78	April 7	New York	W 114–102	Bird (38)	Parish (21)	Bird (10)	Boston Garden; 14,890	62–16
79	April 9	@ Philadelphia	L 104–113	Wedman (24)	McHale (10)	Bird (9)	The Spectrum; 17,921	62–17
80	April 11	@ Cleveland	W 121–115	Bird (29)	McHale (11)	Bird (12)	Richfield Coliseum; 20,363	63–17
81	April 12	Milwaukee	L 113–115 (OT)	Bird (47)	Bird (14)	Williams (7)	Boston Garden; 14,890	63–18
82	April 14	New Jersey	L 118–129	McHale, Bird (23)	Bird (7)	Johnson (7)	Boston Garden; 14,890	63–19

1984–85 schedule

== Playoffs ==
1985 playoff game log
First round: 3–1 (home: 2–0; road: 1–1)

Game	Date	Team	Score	High points	High rebounds	High assists	Location Attendance	Series
1	April 18	Cleveland	W 126–123	Larry Bird (40)	Kevin McHale (12)	Dennis Johnson (11)	Boston Garden; 14,890	1–0
2	April 20	Cleveland	W 108–106	Larry Bird (30)	Bird, Parish (11)	Larry Bird (7)	Boston Garden; 14,890	2–0
3	April 23	@ Cleveland	L 98–105	Scott Wedman (30)	Kevin McHale (11)	Dennis Johnson (10)	Richfield Coliseum; 20,900	2–1
4	April 25	@ Cleveland	W 117–115	Larry Bird (34)	Larry Bird (14)	Larry Bird (7)	Richfield Coliseum; 20,900	3–1

Conference Semi-finals: 4–2 (home: 3–0; road: 1–2)

Game	Date	Team	Score	High points	High rebounds	High assists	Location Attendance	Series
1	April 28	Detroit	W 133–99	Robert Parish (27)	Robert Parish (16)	Ainge, Williams (7)	Boston Garden; 14,890	1–0
2	April 30	Detroit	W 121–114	Larry Bird (42)	McHale, Bird (10)	Dennis Johnson (7)	Boston Garden; 14,890	2–0
3	May 2	@ Detroit	L 117–125	Dennis Johnson (27)	Larry Bird (13)	Larry Bird (8)	Joe Louis Arena; 14,209	2–1
4	May 5	@ Detroit	L 99–102	Kevin McHale (24)	Kevin McHale (10)	Larry Bird (7)	Joe Louis Arena; 14,350	2–2
5	May 8	Detroit	W 130–123	Larry Bird (43)	Larry Bird (13)	Johnson, Ainge (6)	Boston Garden; 14,890	3–2
6	May 10	@ Detroit	W 123–113	Dennis Johnson (22)	Robert Parish (13)	Danny Ainge (9)	Joe Louis Arena; 21,193	4–2

Conference finals: 4–1 (home: 3–0; road: 1–1)

Game	Date	Team	Score	High points	High rebounds	High assists	Location Attendance	Series
1	May 12	Philadelphia	W 108–93	Kevin McHale (28)	Robert Parish (13)	Dennis Johnson (8)	Boston Garden; 14,890	1–0
2	May 14	Philadelphia	W 106–98	Larry Bird (24)	Robert Parish (16)	Bird, Johnson (7)	Boston Garden; 14,890	2–0
3	May 18	@ Philadelphia	W 105–94	Larry Bird (26)	Robert Parish (14)	Danny Ainge (7)	Spectrum; 17,921	3–0
4	May 19	@ Philadelphia	L 104–115	Kevin McHale (25)	Kevin McHale (17)	Danny Ainge (8)	Spectrum; 17,921	3–1
5	May 22	Philadelphia	W 102–100	Dennis Johnson (23)	Kevin McHale (14)	Dennis Johnson (8)	Boston Garden; 14,890	4–1

NBA Finals: 2–4 (home: 1–2; road: 1–2)

Game	Date	Team	Score	High points	High rebounds	High assists	Location Attendance	Series
1	May 27, 1985; 3:00 p.m. EDT	L.A. Lakers	W 148–114	McHale, Wedman (26)	McHale (9)	Johnson (10)	Boston Garden; 14,890	1–0
2	May 30, 1985; 9:00 p.m. EDT	L.A. Lakers	L 102–109	Bird (30)	Bird (12)	Johnson (8)	Boston Garden; 14,890	1–1
3	June 2, 1985; 3:30 p.m. EDT	@ L.A. Lakers	L 111–136	McHale (31)	McHale (10)	Ainge (10)	The Forum; 17,505	1–2
4	June 5, 1985; 9:00 p.m. EDT	@ L.A. Lakers	W 107–105	McHale (28)	McHale (12)	Johnson (12)	The Forum; 17,505	2–2
5	June 7, 1985; 9:00 p.m. EDT	@ L.A. Lakers	L 111–120	Parish (26)	McHale (10)	Johnson (17)	The Forum; 17,505	2–3
6	June 9, 1985; 1:00 p.m. EDT	L.A. Lakers	L 100–111	McHale (32)	McHale (16)	Ainge (11)	Boston Garden; 14,890	2–4

1985 schedule

== Player statistics ==
Legend
GP	Games played	GS	Games started	MPG	Minutes per game
FG%	Field-goal percentage	3P%	3-point field-goal percentage	FT%	Free-throw percentage
RPG	Rebounds per game	APG	Assists per game	SPG	Steals per game
BPG	Blocks per game	PPG	Points per game

=== Regular season ===
* – Recorded statistics when playing for Boston

Boston Celtics statistics
Player	GP	GS	MPG	FG%	3P%	FT%	RPG	APG	SPG	BPG	PPG
Larry Bird	80	77	39.5	.522	.427	.882	10.5	6.6	1.6	1.2	28.7
Dennis Johnson	80	77	37.2	.462	.269	.853	4.0	6.8	1.2	.5	15.7
Robert Parish	79	78	36.1	.524	.000	.743	10.6	1.6	.7	1.3	17.6
Danny Ainge	75	73	34.2	.529	.268	.868	3.6	5.3	1.6	.1	12.9
Kevin Mchale	79	31	33.6	.570	1.000	.760	9.0	1.8	.4	1.5	19.8
Cedric Maxwell	57	51	26.2	.533	.000	.831	4.2	1.8	.6	.3	11.1
Ray Williams	23	5	20.0	.385	.261	.674	2.5	3.9	1.3	.2	6.4
Scott Wedman	78	5	14.4	.478	.500	.764	2.0	1.2	.3	.1	6.4
Quinn Buckner	75	6	11.4	.383	.000	.640	1.2	2.0	.8	.0	2.4
Carlos Clark	62	3	9.1	.421	.000	.774	1.1	.8	.6	.0	2.7
M.L. Carr	47	0	8.4	.416	.391	1.000	.9	.5	.4	.1	3.2
Greg Kite	55	4	7.7	.375	.000	.688	1.6	.3	.1	.2	1.6
Rick Carlisle	38	0	4.7	388	.000	.882	.6	.7	.1	.0	1.8

== Awards and records ==
- Larry Bird, NBA Most Valuable Player Award
- Kevin McHale, NBA Sixth Man of the Year Award
- Larry Bird, All-NBA First Team
- Dennis Johnson, NBA All-Defensive Second Team

== See also ==
- 1984–85 NBA season
