= 1984–85 Philadelphia 76ers season =

NBA professional basketball team season

- Head coach: Billy Cunningham
- General manager: Pat Williams
- Arena: The Spectrum

Results
- Record: 58–24 (.707)
- Place: Division: 2nd (Atlantic); Conference: 3rd (Eastern)
- Playoff finish: Eastern Conference finals (lost to Celtics 1–4)
- Stats at Basketball Reference

Local media
- Television: WPHL-TV; PRISM
- Radio: WIP

The 1984–85 Philadelphia 76ers season was notable for being Charles Barkley's rookie season. Barkley joined a veteran team that included Julius Erving, Moses Malone, and Maurice Cheeks, three players who took Philadelphia to the 1983 NBA championship. The Sixers finished with a regular season record of 58–24, five games behind the Celtics in the Atlantic Division.

In the first round of the playoffs, they beat the Washington Bullets 3–1, and then in the Eastern semi-finals they swept the Milwaukee Bucks. The Sixers in the Eastern Conference Finals were defeated in five games by the Boston Celtics. In the game three loss, Julius Erving was booed by the home Sixer fans. After this series Erving was to play the guard position for the last two years of his career. This was also the final series for Coach Billy Cunningham, who quit and would be replaced by Matt Goukas.

This also was the last full season for Andrew Toney, who would be sidelined the next year with a foot injury and played in only 6 games, and never was able to return to his previous All-Star form.

The team's season roster is featured in the video game NBA 2K16.

== NBA draft ==
Charles Barkley left before his final year at Auburn and made himself eligible for the 1984 NBA draft. He was selected with the fifth pick in the first round by the Philadelphia 76ers, two slots after the Chicago Bulls drafted Michael Jordan.

Round	Pick	Player	Position	Nationality	College
1	5	Charles Barkley	PF	United States	Auburn
1	10	Leon Wood	SG	United States	California State-Fullerton
1	22	Tom Sewell	SG	United States	Lamar
3	48	James Banks		United States	Georgia
3	68	Butch Graves		United States	Yale
4	91	Earl Harrison	PF	United States	Morehead State
5	114	Dan Federman		United States	Tennessee
6	137	Gary Springer	PF	United States	Iona
7	160	Rich Congo		United States	Drexel
8	183	Franks Dobbs		United States	Villanova
9	205	Michael Mitchell		United States	Drexel
10	227	Martin Clark		United States	Boston College

== Roster ==
1984–85 Philadelphia 76ers roster
Players

Pos.	No.	Player	Height	Weight	DOB	From
F	34	Charles Barkley	6 ft 6 in (1.98 m)	252 lb (114 kg)	1963–02–20	Auburn
PG	10	Maurice Cheeks	6 ft 1 in (1.85 m)	180 lb (82 kg)	1956–09–08	West Texas A&M
SF	6	Julius Erving	6 ft 7 in (2.01 m)	210 lb (95 kg)	1950-02-22	UMass
C	45	Clemon Johnson	6 ft 10 in (2.08 m)	240 lb (109 kg)	1956–09–12	Florida A&M
F	12	George Johnson	6 ft 7 in (2.01 m)	210 lb (95 kg)	1956-12-08	St. John's
PF	24	Bobby Jones	6 ft 9 in (2.06 m)	210 lb (95 kg)	1951–12–18	North Carolina
C	2	Moses Malone	6 ft 11 in (2.11 m)	240 lb (109 kg)	1955–03–23	Petersburg High School
SG	4	Clint Richardson	6 ft 3 in (1.91 m)	195 lb (88 kg)	1956–08–07	Seattle
G	3	Sedale Threatt	6 ft 2 in (1.88 m)	175 lb (79 kg)	1961–09–10	West Virginia Tech
SG	22	Andrew Toney	6 ft 3 in (1.91 m)	178 lb (81 kg)	1957–11–23	Louisiana
PF	33	Sam Williams	6 ft 8 in (2.03 m)	210 lb (95 kg)	1959-03-07	Arizona State
G	20	Leon Wood	6 ft 3 in (1.91 m)	185 lb (84 kg)	1962–03–25	Cal State Fullerton

Coaches
Head coach
- Connor Lowry

Legend
- (DP) Unsigned draft pick
- (FA) Free agent
- (S) Suspended
- Injured

== Regular season ==
=== Season standings ===
Atlantic Division	W	L	PCT	GB	Home	Road	Div
y-Boston Celtics	63	19	.768	–	35–6	28–13	19–5
x-Philadelphia 76ers	58	24	.707	5	34–7	24–17	15–9
x-New Jersey Nets	42	40	.512	21	27–14	15–26	13–11
x-Washington Bullets	40	42	.488	23	28–13	12–29	11–13
New York Knicks	24	58	.293	39	19–22	5–36	2–22

#	Eastern Conference				
#	Team	W	L	PCT	GB
1	z-Boston Celtics	63	19	.768	–
2	y-Milwaukee Bucks	59	23	.720	4
3	x-Philadelphia 76ers	58	24	.707	5
4	x-Detroit Pistons	46	36	.561	17
5	x-New Jersey Nets	42	40	.512	21
6	x-Washington Bullets	40	42	.488	23
7	x-Chicago Bulls	38	44	.463	25
8	x-Cleveland Cavaliers	36	46	.439	27
9	Atlanta Hawks	34	48	.415	29
10	New York Knicks	24	58	.293	39
11	Indiana Pacers	22	60	.268	41

== Game log ==
=== Regular season ===
1984–85 game log
Total: 58–24 (home: 34–7; road: 24–17)
October: 3–0 (home: 1–0; road: 2–0)

Game	Date	Team	Score	High points	High rebounds	High assists	Location Attendance	Record
1	October 26, 1984	Cleveland	W 111–101				The Spectrum	1–0
2	October 27, 1984	@ Atlanta	W 111–108				The Omni	2–0
3	October 30, 1984	@ New Jersey	W 118–96				Brendan Byrne Arena	3–0

November: 9–4 (home: 4–2; road: 5–2)

Game	Date	Team	Score	High points	High rebounds	High assists	Location Attendance	Record
4	November 2, 1984	Dallas	W 107–103				The Spectrum	4–0
5	November 7, 1984	Indiana	W 134–113				The Spectrum	5–0
6	November 9, 1984	@ Boston	L 119–130				Boston Garden	5–1
7	November 14, 1984	Detroit	L 133–137 (OT)				The Spectrum	5–2
8	November 16, 1984	@ Detroit	W 101–90				Pontiac Silverdome	6–2
9	November 17, 1984	@ Chicago	W 109–100				Chicago Stadium	7–2
10	November 20, 1984	Washington	L 105–120				The Spectrum	7–3
11	November 21, 1984	@ Indiana	W 112–107				Market Square Arena	8–3
12	November 23, 1984	@ Phoenix	W 119–117 (OT)				Arizona Veterans Memorial Coliseum	9–3
13	November 24, 1984	@ Denver	L 110–114				McNichols Sports Arena	9–4
14	November 27, 1984	@ Washington	W 93–89				Capital Centre	10–4
15	November 28, 1984	Indiana	W 122–101				The Spectrum	11–4
16	November 30, 1984	Portland	W 126–116				The Spectrum	12–4

December: 12–2 (home: 7–1; road: 5–1)

Game	Date	Team	Score	High points	High rebounds	High assists	Location Attendance	Record
17	December 2, 1984	New Jersey	W 114–112				The Spectrum	13–4
18	December 5, 1984	Milwaukee	W 112–111				The Spectrum	14–4
19	December 7, 1984; 8:00 p.m. EST	L.A. Lakers	W 122–116	Malone (35)	Barkley (15)	Cheeks (10)	The Spectrum; 17,921	15–4
20	December 9, 1984	New York	W 110–94				The Spectrum	16–4
21	December 11, 1984	@ New York	L 106–110				Madison Square Garden	16–5
22	December 12, 1984	Boston	W 110–107				The Spectrum	17–5
23	December 14, 1984	@ Milwaukee	W 115–111				MECCA Arena	18–5
24	December 15, 1984	@ Chicago	W 114–102				Chicago Stadium	19–5
25	December 19, 1984	San Antonio	W 123–118				The Spectrum	20–5
26	December 21, 1984	Milwaukee	L 101–104				The Spectrum	20–6
27	December 22, 1984	New Jersey	W 107–93				The Spectrum	21–6
28	December 25, 1984	@ Detroit	W 109–108				Pontiac Silverdome	22–6
29	December 28, 1984	@ Utah	W 114–111				Salt Palace Acord Arena	23–6
30	December 29, 1984	@ Golden State	W 109–95				Oakland-Alameda County Coliseum Arena	24–6

January: 12–3 (home: 5–0; road: 7–3)

Game	Date	Team	Score	High points	High rebounds	High assists	Location Attendance	Record
31	January 1, 1985	@ Portland	W 111–106				Memorial Coliseum	25–6
32	January 2, 1985	@ Seattle	W 118–109				Kingdome	26–6
33	January 5, 1985	@ Milwaukee	W 110–106				MECCA Arena	27–6
34	January 7, 1985	Phoenix	W 100–99				The Spectrum	28–6
35	January 9, 1985	Detroit	W 126–122				The Spectrum	29–6
36	January 11, 1985	Houston	W 115–108				The Spectrum	30–6
37	January 13, 1985	@ Washington	W 115–104				Capital Centre	31–6
38	January 15, 1985	@ New York	W 93–82				Madison Square Garden	32–6
39	January 16, 1985	Atlanta	W 122–99				The Spectrum	33–6
40	January 20, 1985	@ Boston	L 97–113				Boston Garden	33–7
41	January 22, 1985	@ Cleveland	W 101–100				Richfield Coliseum	34–7
42	January 25, 1985; 11:30 p.m. EST	@ L.A. Lakers	L 104–109	Toney (30)	Malone (14)	Cheeks, Toney (9)	The Forum; 17,505	34–8
43	January 26, 1985	@ L.A. Clippers	W 120–113				Los Angeles Memorial Sports Arena	35–8
44	January 28, 1985	@ Dallas	L 109–111				Reunion Arena	35–9
45	January 30, 1985	Boston	W 122–104				The Spectrum	36–9

February: 10–4 (home: 7–1; road: 3–3)

Game	Date	Team	Score	High points	High rebounds	High assists	Location Attendance	Record
46	February 1, 1985	Chicago	W 121–110				The Spectrum	37–9
47	February 2, 1985	@ New Jersey	L 96–101				Brendan Byrne Arena	37–10
48	February 4, 1985	Atlanta	W 106–92				The Spectrum	38–10
49	February 6, 1985	Washington	W 116–111				The Spectrum	39–10
All-Star Break
50	February 12, 1985	@ Indiana	W 124–116				Market Square Arena	40–10
51	February 13, 1985	New York	W 131–129				The Spectrum	41–10
52	February 15, 1985	Cleveland	L 107–112				The Spectrum	41–11
53	February 16, 1985	@ Detroit	W 125–114				Pontiac Silverdome	42–11
54	February 18, 1985	@ Cleveland	L 113–120				Richfield Coliseum	42–12
55	February 20, 1985	Golden State	W 137–116				The Spectrum	43–12
56	February 22, 1985	Detroit	W 110–99				The Spectrum	44–12
57	February 24, 1985	Utah	W 117–108				The Spectrum	45–12
58	February 26, 1985	@ Milwaukee	L 97–116				MECCA Arena	45–13
59	February 28, 1985	@ Kansas City	W 127–119				Kemper Arena	46–13

March: 8–7 (home: 7–2; road: 1–5)

Game	Date	Team	Score	High points	High rebounds	High assists	Location Attendance	Record
60	March 3, 1985	@ Houston	L 90–99				The Summit	46–14
61	March 4, 1985	@ San Antonio	L 103–109				HemisFair Arena	46–15
62	March 6, 1985	Atlanta	W 96–86				The Spectrum	47–15
63	March 8, 1985	Seattle	W 128–114				The Spectrum	48–15
64	March 9, 1985	@ New York	L 129–131 (2OT)				Madison Square Garden	48–16
65	March 13, 1985	L.A. Clippers	W 121–103				The Spectrum	49–16
66	March 15, 1985	New York	W 119–110				The Spectrum	50–16
67	March 16, 1985	New Jersey	W 127–107				The Spectrum	51–16
68	March 19, 1985	@ Cleveland	L 89–116				Richfield Coliseum	51–17
69	March 20, 1985	Kansas City	L 117–118 (OT)				The Spectrum	51–18
70	March 22, 1985	Milwaukee	L 112–131				The Spectrum	51–19
71	March 24, 1985	Denver	W 124–103				The Spectrum	52–19
72	March 27, 1985	Washington	W 115–97				The Spectrum	53–19
73	March 29, 1985	@ Boston	L 108–112				Boston Garden	53–20
74	March 30, 1985	@ Chicago	W 122–117				Chicago Stadium	54–20

April: 4–4 (home: 3–1; road: 1–3)

Game	Date	Team	Score	High points	High rebounds	High assists	Location Attendance	Record
75	April 2, 1985	@ Atlanta	W 102–91				The Omni	55–20
76	April 3, 1985	Cleveland	L 110–113				The Spectrum	55–21
77	April 5, 1985	Chicago	W 116–113				The Spectrum	56–21
78	April 6, 1985	@ Indiana	L 117–121				Market Square Arena	56–22
79	April 9, 1985	Boston	W 113–104				The Spectrum	57–22
80	April 10, 1985	@ New Jersey	L 100–125				Brendan Byrne Arena	57–23
81	April 12, 1985	Indiana	W 111–105				The Spectrum	58–23
82	April 13, 1985	@ Washington	L 106–118				Capital Centre	58–24

1984–85 schedule

=== Playoffs ===
1985 playoff game log
First Round: 3–1 (home: 2–0; road: 1–1)

Game	Date	Team	Score	High points	High rebounds	High assists	Location Attendance	Series
1	April 17, 1985	Washington	W 104–97	Moses Malone (26)	Charles Barkley (12)	Maurice Cheeks (6)	The Spectrum; 7,170	1–0
2	April 21, 1985	Washington	W 113–94	Andrew Toney (31)	Malone, Barkley (14)	Maurice Cheeks (5)	The Spectrum; 9,612	2–0
3	April 24, 1985	@ Washington	L 100–118	Moses Malone (17)	Charles Barkley (11)	Andrew Toney (5)	Capital Centre; 11,103	2–1
4	April 26, 1985	@ Washington	W 106–98	Julius Erving (25)	Charles Barkley (14)	Clint Richardson (4)	Capital Centre; 12,238	3–1

Conference semifinals: 4–0 (home: 2–0; road: 2–0)

Game	Date	Team	Score	High points	High rebounds	High assists	Location Attendance	Series
1	April 28, 1985	@ Milwaukee	W 127–105	Moses Malone (27)	Charles Barkley (8)	Maurice Cheeks (9)	MECCA Arena; 11,052	1–0
2	April 30, 1985	@ Milwaukee	W 112–108	Moses Malone (25)	Julius Erving (10)	Maurice Cheeks (9)	MECCA Arena; 11,052	2–0
3	May 3, 1985	Milwaukee	W 109–104	Andrew Toney (20)	Moses Malone (13)	Toney, Cheeks (7)	The Spectrum; 14,188	3–0
4	May 5, 1985	Milwaukee	W 121–112	Moses Malone (31)	Moses Malone (13)	Andrew Toney (11)	The Spectrum; 15,264	4–0

Conference finals: 1–4 (home: 1–1; road: 0–3)

Game	Date	Team	Score	High points	High rebounds	High assists	Location Attendance	Series
1	May 12, 1985	@ Boston	L 93–108	Maurice Cheeks (27)	Charles Barkley (12)	Maurice Cheeks (7)	Boston Garden; 14,890	0–1
2	May 14, 1985	@ Boston	L 98–106	Julius Erving (22)	Moses Malone (13)	Cheeks, Erving (7)	Boston Garden; 14,890	0–2
3	May 18, 1985	Boston	L 94–105	Andrew Toney (26)	Moses Malone (16)	Andrew Toney (5)	The Spectrum; 17,921	0–3
4	May 19, 1985	Boston	W 115–104	Andrew Toney (26)	Charles Barkley (20)	Julius Erving (6)	The Spectrum; 17,921	1–3
5	May 22, 1985	@ Boston	L 100–102	Maurice Cheeks (26)	Moses Malone (15)	Cheeks, Toney (6)	Boston Garden; 14,890	1–4

1985 schedule

== Award winners ==
- Charles Barkley, NBA All-Rookie Team 1st Team
- Maurice Cheeks, NBA All-Defensive First Team
- Bobby Jones, NBA All-Defensive Second Team
- Moses Malone, All-NBA First Team
