= Maurice Cheeks =

American basketball coach and player (born 1956)

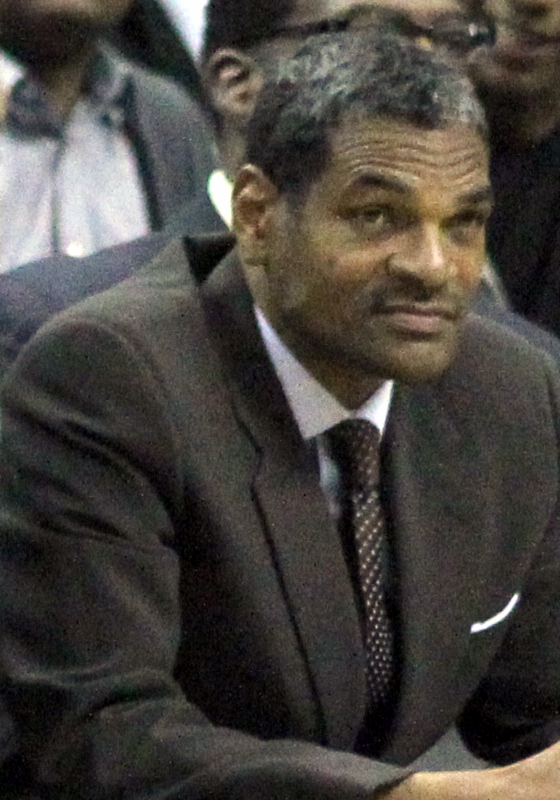
- Cheeks in 2011

New York Knicks
- Title: Assistant coach
- League: NBA

Personal information
- Born: September 8, 1956 (age 70) Chicago, Illinois, U.S.
- Listed height: 6 ft 1 in (1.85 m)
- Listed weight: 180 lb (82 kg)

Career information
- High school: DuSable (Chicago, Illinois)
- College: West Texas A&M (1974–1978)
- NBA draft: 1978: 2nd round, 36th overall pick
- Drafted by: Philadelphia 76ers
- Playing career: 1978–1993
- Position: Point guard
- Number: 10, 1
- Coaching career: 1993–present

Career history

Playing
- 1978–1989: Philadelphia 76ers
- 1989–1990: San Antonio Spurs
- 1990–1991: New York Knicks
- 1991–1992: Atlanta Hawks
- 1993: New Jersey Nets

Career highlights
- As player: NBA champion (1983); 4× NBA All-Star (1983, 1986–1988); 4× NBA All-Defensive First Team (1983–1986); NBA All-Defensive Second Team (1987); No. 10 retired by Philadelphia 76ers; 2× First-team All-MVC (1976, 1978); Second-team All-MVC (1977); As assistant coach: NBA champion (2026); NBA Cup champion (2025)

Career statistics
- Points: 12,195 (11.1 ppg)
- Assists: 7,392 (6.7 apg)
- Steals: 2,310 (2.1 spg)
- Stats at NBA.com
- Stats at Basketball Reference
- Basketball Hall of Fame

Maurice Edward Cheeks (born September 8, 1956) is an American professional basketball coach and former player who serves as an assistant coach for the New York Knicks of the National Basketball Association (NBA). He has also served as head coach of the Portland Trail Blazers, Philadelphia 76ers, and Detroit Pistons. Cheeks was inducted into the Naismith Memorial Basketball Hall of Fame as a player in 2018. He was the first player with 2,000 steals solely in the NBA.

== Early life and college ==
Cheeks was born in Chicago on September 8, 1956, and grew up in the Robert Taylor Homes. He attended DuSable High School. He only had significant playing time on the basketball team in his senior year. His high school teammate William Dise was heavily recruited by college basketball programs, and Dise told the schools that if they wanted him, they also had to offer Cheeks a scholarship to join him. Ron Ekker, head coach at West Texas State University (now West Texas A&M) only agreed to accept both Dise and Cheeks after their high school coach, Bob Bonner, said Cheeks would eventually be the better player; and then watching Cheeks play in a local gym pickup game.

Cheeks attended West Texas from 1974 to 1978, and was a four-year starter under Ekker. He wanted to leave after his first year, but his mother convinced Cheeks to stay. He was an All-Missouri Valley Conference player for three straight seasons (first team in 1975–1976 and 1977–1978, and second team in 1976–1977). He was selected team Most Valuable Player three times. As a senior, he averaged 16.8 points per game, and shot nearly 57% for his collegiate career.

As of 2024, Cheeks ranks 5th in field goal percentage in WTSU/WTAM history (56.8), 12th in points per game for a career (11.8) and total field goals, and had the fourth most free throws made in a single season (212).

Cheeks was inducted into the West Texas A & M Hall of Champions in 1988. He was inducted into the Missouri Valley Conference Hall of Fame in 2021. He was selected to the Missouri Valley Conference Men's Basketball 50 Greatest Players.

== Playing career ==
After college, Cheeks was selected as the 36th pick in the second round of the 1978 NBA draft by the Philadelphia 76ers. He played 15 years as a point guard in the NBA, including 11 with the Philadelphia 76ers. As a 76er, he earned four trips to the NBA All-Star Game, and he helped the 76ers to three trips to the NBA Finals in a four-year span in the early 1980s (1980, 1982, and 1983), including an NBA championship in 1983.

While starting at point guard for a Sixers team that at times included stars Julius Erving, Moses Malone, Andrew Toney, and Charles Barkley, Cheeks was well regarded for his team play and defensive skills. He was named to four straight NBA All-Defensive squads from 1983 to 1986, and earned a spot on the second team in 1987. When he retired in 1993, he was fifth in NBA history in total assists, and as of 2024, he is sixteenth on the combined ABA/NBA assist list.

=== Philadelphia 76ers (1978–1989) ===
He had his best seasons with the 76ers. At the young age of 22 he gained a notable role on the 76ers, solidifying himself as the starting point guard and earning himself valuable minutes, starting all 82 games and playing nearly 30 minutes per game. The 76ers were also in playoff contention for every year that he was on the team except for the 1987–88 season.

By his fifth year in the league, he was selected to his first All-Star appearance, starting the game, and had averaged 12.5 points, 6.9 assists, and 2.3 steals for the 1982–83 season. The 76ers also had the best season in this 76ers era, having a 65–17 record. This is the second-best season record in the 76ers franchise history, the 1966–1967 team being 68–13; and the second-best record league-wide in the 1980s behind only the 1986 Boston Celtics.

They would go on to win the NBA championship that year, which was Cheeks' first and only championship. He would be an integral part of the 76ers for the rest of his time in Philadelphia, however the 76ers failed to repeat the level of success that they reached in the 1982–83 season. He would be selected to three more All-Star appearances from 1986 to 1988. In the 1986 playoffs he averaged a playoff career high 20.8 points throughout the whole postseason.

In the 1986–87 season he would average a career high 15.6 points. However the 76ers were no longer elite title contenders and lost in the first round in the 1987 playoffs. The following year they missed the playoffs in what was Cheeks' last all-star appearance. Cheeks played one more season for the 76ers; they were back in the playoffs but got swept in the first round by the New York Knicks.

=== San Antonio Spurs (1989–1990) ===
In the 1989 off-season the Philadelphia 76ers traded Maurice Cheeks, Chris Welp, and David Wingate to the San Antonio Spurs for Johnny Dawkins and Jay Vincent. At 33 years old, Cheeks was aging and in the twilight of his career but he still played well for the Spurs and averaged 10.9 points for his time in San Antonio. He played 50 games for the club and was the starting point guard. However he was not able to finish the 1989–90 season for the Spurs as he was traded to the Knicks before the season ended.

=== New York Knicks (1990–1991) ===
On February 21, 1990, Cheeks was traded to the New York Knicks for Rod Strickland. Cheeks played the remainder of the season in New York, averaging 7.9 points in 31 games for the franchise. The Knicks went 45–37 that year and made the 1990 playoffs, however they lost in the second round 1–4 to the Detroit Pistons. The following season, Cheeks played in 76 games, averaging 7.8 points per game and 5.7 assists per game, and the Knicks made the playoffs, but were swept by the Bulls in the first round.

=== Atlanta Hawks (1991–1992) ===
In the 1991 off-season the New York Knicks traded Cheeks to the Atlanta Hawks for Tim McCormick and a 1994 first round draft pick (which later became Charlie Ward). Cheeks' points average dropped drastically to 4.6 and he was no longer a starting calibre player. He became an unrestricted free agent in the 1992 off-season and did not re-sign with the Hawks.

In the second-to-last game of the 1991–92 season (April 15, 1992), while playing for the Hawks against the Knicks, Cheeks picked off four steals to surpass longtime Philadelphia teammate Julius Erving's steals record of 2,272 for combined ABA and NBA steals.

=== New Jersey Nets (1992–1993) ===
On January 7, 1993, the New Jersey Nets signed Cheeks as a free agent. He averaged a career-low 3.6 points for the season and he only played 35 games for the franchise. The Nets reached the playoffs but lost in the first round 2–3 to the Cleveland Cavaliers.

Cheeks retired from the NBA following the 1992–93 season.

=== Career ===
In NBA history, as of 2024, Cheeks ranks sixth in steals and sixteenth in assists among ABA/NBA combined rankings. Upon his retirement from the NBA in 1993, he was the NBA all-time leader in steals, third all-time in playoff steals, and fifth in assists. He averaged 11.7 points and over 2 steals per game for his career. In his rookie year, Cheeks averaged 4.1 steals per game in the 1979 NBA Playoffs (37 steals in nine games), an NBA record for one playoff run (as of 2024). As of 2024, he is second all-time in playoff steals per game average, behind only Baron Davis.

== Coaching career ==
After retirement, Cheeks spent one year coaching for the Continental Basketball Association’s Quad City Thunder, before becoming the 76ers assistant coach in 1994 through 2001. He coached under head coaches John Lucas (1994–96), Johnny Davis (1996–97), and Larry Brown, and he was an instrumental part of the Philadelphia team that reached the 2001 NBA Finals. In 2001, he was hired as Portland Trail Blazers head coach. He led the team to two playoff berths in four years as coach, but could not get past the first round. He was fired after a poor start to the 2004–05 campaign.

On April 25, 2003, during a game between the Trail Blazers and the Dallas Mavericks, Cheeks famously aided 13-year-old Natalie Gilbert in singing the American national anthem. After Gilbert forgot the words at "At the twilight's last gleaming," Cheeks rushed over to help her, and they finished it together as the entire Rose Garden Arena crowd sang with them. Cheeks and Gilbert received a standing ovation after the song was over. Cheeks actions were used by Harvard Business School Professor Thomas J. DeLong as an example of true leadership in times of crisis. Former 76ers general manager Pat Williams called it "'just a beautiful moment of ... humanity.'"

In 2005, Cheeks was named as head coach of the 76ers. Cheeks was popular among 76ers fans because of his eleven-year tenure with the 76ers, during which he helped guide the 76ers to the 1983 NBA championship. The move was also praised by 76ers star Allen Iverson, who worked with Cheeks during his run as 76ers' Assistant Head Coach.

However, he missed the playoffs in each of his first two seasons. Frustrations began to grow with 76ers veterans Allen Iverson and Chris Webber, who were not happy with the team's direction. Toward the end of the 2006 season, the two were fined for tardiness coming to a game, but soon apologized profusely to Cheeks. During the 2006–07 season, Iverson would be traded to the Nuggets and Webber would be released, leaving Cheeks with one of the youngest teams in the NBA. On February 20, 2007, the 76ers extended Cheeks' contract one year despite his losing record as coach.

At the beginning of the 2007–08 season, expectations were low and the 76ers were picked to finish last in the Conference by many prognosticators. However, the Sixers clinched a playoff berth with a win over the Atlanta Hawks on April 4, 2008. It was their first postseason appearance since 2005, as well as the first in the post-Iverson era. However, they were eliminated by the Detroit Pistons, 4–2. Even with this elimination, many fans considered this to be a successful season, considering that the 76ers were 12 games under .500 in early February and went on to have a 21–7 run that led them to the playoffs.

The 76ers extended Cheeks' contract before the 2008–2009 season to 2010. They started out the 2008–09 NBA season 9–14 despite their signing of Elton Brand and re-signing of Andre Iguodala during the off-season. Due to their slow start, the 76ers fired Cheeks on December 13, 2008.

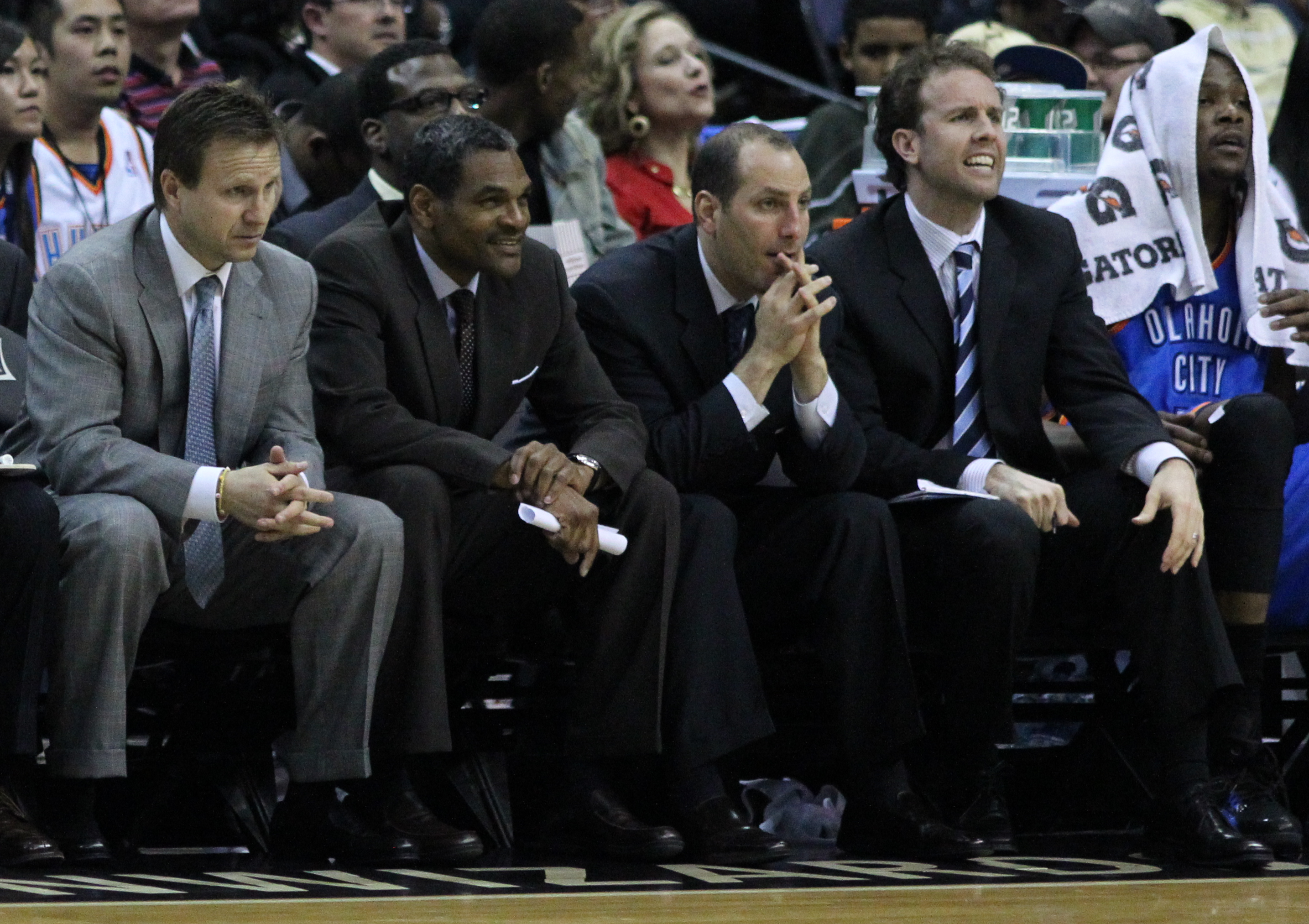
Cheeks with the Thunder coaching staff in 2011

On August 14, 2009, he was hired as an assistant coach for the Oklahoma City Thunder.

On June 10, 2013, Cheeks agreed to become the head coach of the Detroit Pistons. On February 9, 2014, the Detroit Pistons relieved him of his head coaching duties and replaced him with John Loyer on an interim basis for the remainder of the season. The move came after owner Tom Gores suggested that the Pistons were "better than our record" and weren't playing "at their maximum"—a veiled criticism of Cheeks.

On June 29, 2015, Cheeks returned to the Thunder as an assistant coach.

On November 14, 2020, Cheeks was hired by the Chicago Bulls as an assistant coach following the team's hiring of Billy Donovan.

On June 13, 2024, it was reported that Tom Thibodeau was hiring Cheeks to be an assistant coach for the New York Knicks, and Cheeks joined the Knicks coaching staff for the 2024–2025 season.

== Honors and awards ==
On September 7, 2018, Cheeks was inducted into the Naismith Memorial Basketball Hall of Fame as a player. In 2008, he was inducted into the Philadelphia Sports Hall of Fame. In 1995, the 76ers retired Cheeks No. 10 jersey. He was inducted into the West Texas A & M Hall of Champions (1988), and the Missouri Valley Conference Hall of Fame (2021), and was named one of the MVC's 50 greatest players.

In 2022, a group of present and former Philadelphia Inquirer sports writers ranked Cheeks as the seventh greatest Sixer of all-time, only behind fellow hall of fame players Wilt Chamberlain, Julius Erving, Moses Malone, Allen Iverson, Charles Barkley and Hal Greer. In one NBA ranking of the greatest backcourt duos in league history, Cheeks and Andrew Toney were ranked eleventh out of seventy pairs. In 2017, the 76ers unveiled a statue of Cheeks outside their training facility in Camden, New Jersey, joining the statues of Hal Greer, Billy Cunningham (Cheeks' former coach) and Wilt Chamberlain. On the same day, Cheeks, then an assistant coach with the Thunder, was in Philadelphia for the Thunder-Sixers game and was honored with a video montage during the game. He received a standing ovation from the Philadelphia fans, while his team stood and cheered along.

== NBA career statistics ==
Legend
| GP | Games played | GS | Games started | MPG | Minutes per game |
| FG% | Field goal percentage | 3P% | 3-point field goal percentage | FT% | Free throw percentage |
| RPG | Rebounds per game | APG | Assists per game | SPG | Steals per game |
| BPG | Blocks per game | PPG | Points per game | **Bold** | Career high |
| † | Won an NBA championship |

=== Regular season ===
| Year | Team | GP | GS | MPG | FG% | 3P% | FT% | RPG | APG | SPG | BPG | PPG |
|---|---|---|---|---|---|---|---|---|---|---|---|---|
| 1978–79 | Philadelphia | **82** | – | 29.4 | .510 | – | .721 | 3.1 | 5.3 | 2.1 | .1 | 8.4 |
| 1979–80 | Philadelphia | 79 | – | 33.2 | .540 | .444 | .779 | **3.5** | 7.0 | 2.3 | .4 | 11.4 |
| 1980–81 | Philadelphia | 81 | – | 29.8 | .534 | .375 | .787 | 3.0 | 6.9 | 2.4 | **.5** | 9.4 |
| 1981–82 | Philadelphia | 79 | 79 | 31.6 | .521 | .273 | .777 | 3.1 | 8.4 | **2.6** | .4 | 11.2 |
| 1982–83† | Philadelphia | 79 | 79 | 31.2 | .542 | .167 | .754 | 2.6 | 6.9 | 2.3 | .4 | 12.5 |
| 1983–84 | Philadelphia | 75 | 75 | 33.3 | .550 | .400 | .733 | 2.7 | 6.4 | 2.3 | .3 | 12.7 |
| 1984–85 | Philadelphia | 78 | 78 | 33.5 | **.570** | .231 | .879 | 2.8 | 6.4 | 2.2 | .3 | 13.1 |
| 1985–86 | Philadelphia | **82** | **82** | **39.9** | .537 | .235 | .842 | 2.9 | **9.2** | 2.5 | .3 | 15.4 |
| 1986–87 | Philadelphia | 68 | 68 | 38.6 | .527 | .235 | .777 | 3.2 | 7.9 | **2.6** | .2 | **15.6** |
| 1987–88 | Philadelphia | 79 | 79 | 36.3 | .495 | .136 | .825 | 3.2 | 8.0 | 2.1 | .3 | 13.7 |
| 1988–89 | Philadelphia | 71 | 70 | 32.4 | .483 | .077 | .774 | 2.6 | 7.8 | 1.5 | .2 | 11.6 |
| 1989–90 | San Antonio | 50 | 49 | 35.3 | .478 | .111 | .832 | 3.3 | 6.0 | 1.6 | .1 | 10.9 |
| 1989–90 | New York | 31 | 13 | 24.3 | .579 | .429 | .877 | 2.4 | 4.9 | 1.4 | .2 | 7.9 |
| 1990–91 | New York | 76 | 64 | 28.3 | .499 | .250 | .814 | 2.3 | 5.7 | 1.7 | .1 | 7.8 |
| 1991–92 | Atlanta | 56 | 0 | 19.4 | .462 | **.500** | .605 | 1.7 | 3.3 | 1.5 | .0 | 4.6 |
| 1992–93 | New Jersey | 35 | 0 | 14.6 | .548 | .000 | **.889** | 1.2 | 3.1 | .9 | .1 | 3.6 |
| Career | | 1101 | 736 | 31.6 | .523 | .255 | .793 | 2.8 | 6.7 | 2.1 | .3 | 11.1 |
| All-Star | | 4 | 1 | 11.0 | .438 | — | 1.000 | .8 | 1.0 | .8 | .0 | 4.0 |

=== Playoffs ===
| Year | Team | GP | GS | MPG | FG% | 3P% | FT% | RPG | APG | SPG | BPG | PPG |
|---|---|---|---|---|---|---|---|---|---|---|---|---|
| 1979 | Philadelphia | 9 | – | 36.7 | .545 | – | .661 | 3.9 | 7.0 | **4.1** | .4 | 18.8 |
| 1980 | Philadelphia | 18 | – | 37.5 | .511 | .200 | .707 | 4.1 | 6.2 | 2.5 | .2 | 11.6 |
| 1981 | Philadelphia | 16 | – | 32.1 | .544 | .000 | .762 | 3.2 | 7.3 | 2.5 | **.8** | 10.5 |
| 1982 | Philadelphia | **21** | – | 36.4 | .472 | .111 | .769 | 3.0 | 8.2 | 2.3 | .3 | 14.3 |
| 1983† | Philadelphia | 13 | – | 37.2 | .503 | **.500** | .703 | 3.0 | 7.0 | 2.0 | .2 | 16.3 |
| 1984 | Philadelphia | 5 | – | 34.2 | .522 | .000 | .867 | 2.4 | 3.8 | 2.6 | .0 | 16.6 |
| 1985 | Philadelphia | 13 | **13** | 37.2 | .529 | .000 | .857 | 3.5 | 5.2 | 2.4 | .4 | 15.2 |
| 1986 | Philadelphia | 12 | 12 | **43.3** | .516 | .000 | .849 | **4.7** | 7.1 | 1.1 | .3 | **20.8** |
| 1987 | Philadelphia | 5 | 5 | 42.0 | .530 | .000 | .857 | 2.6 | 8.8 | 1.8 | **.8** | 17.6 |
| 1989 | Philadelphia | 3 | 3 | 42.7 | .512 | .000 | .846 | 3.7 | **13.0** | 2.3 | .3 | 17.7 |
| 1990 | New York | 10 | 10 | 38.8 | .481 | .000 | **.903** | 3.9 | 8.5 | 1.7 | .2 | 12.8 |
| 1991 | New York | 3 | 3 | 33.7 | **.609** | **.333** | .500 | 3.0 | 5.3 | 1.0 | .3 | 10.0 |
| 1993 | New Jersey | 5 | 0 | 16.4 | .478 | – | .000 | 1.2 | 2.8 | 1.2 | .2 | 4.4 |
| Career | | 133 | 46 | 36.5 | .512 | .098 | .777 | 3.4 | 6.9 | 2.2 | .3 | 14.4 |

== Head coaching record ==
Legend
| Regular season | G | Games coached | W | Games won | L | Games lost | W–L % | Win–loss % |
| Playoffs | PG | Playoff games | PW | Playoff wins | PL | Playoff losses | PW–L % | Playoff win–loss % |

| Team | Year | G | W | L | W–L% | Finish | PG | PW | PL | PW–L% | Result |
|---|---|---|---|---|---|---|---|---|---|---|---|
| Portland | 2001–02 | 82 | 49 | 33 | .598 | 3rd in Pacific | 3 | 0 | 3 | .000 | Lost in First round |
| Portland | 2002–03 | 82 | 50 | 32 | .610 | 3rd in Pacific | 7 | 3 | 4 | .429 | Lost in First round |
| Portland | 2003–04 | 82 | 41 | 41 | .500 | 3rd in Pacific | — | — | — | — | Missed Playoffs |
| Portland | 2004–05 | 55 | 22 | 33 | .400 | (fired) | — | — | — | — | — |
| Philadelphia | 2005–06 | 82 | 38 | 44 | .463 | 2nd in Atlantic | — | — | — | — | Missed Playoffs |
| Philadelphia | 2006–07 | 82 | 35 | 47 | .427 | 3rd in Atlantic | — | — | — | — | Missed Playoffs |
| Philadelphia | 2007–08 | 82 | 40 | 42 | .488 | 3rd in Atlantic | 6 | 2 | 4 | .333 | Lost in First round |
| Philadelphia | 2008–09 | 23 | 9 | 14 | .391 | (fired) | — | — | — | — | — |
| Detroit | 2013–14 | 50 | 21 | 29 | .420 | (fired) | — | — | — | — | — |
| Career | | 620 | 305 | 315 | .492 | | 16 | 5 | 11 | .313 | |

== See also ==
- List of National Basketball Association career assists leaders
- List of National Basketball Association career steals leaders
- List of National Basketball Association career playoff assists leaders
- List of National Basketball Association career playoff steals leaders
- List of National Basketball Association players with most steals in a game
- List of National Basketball Association annual minutes leaders
