= 1983 NBA playoffs =

Postseason tournament

Tournament details
- Dates: April 19–May 31, 1983
- Season: 1982–83
- Teams: 12

Final positions
- Champions: Philadelphia 76ers (3rd title)
- Runners-up: Los Angeles Lakers
- Semifinalists: San Antonio Spurs; Milwaukee Bucks

Tournament statistics
- Scoring leader(s): Kareem Abdul-Jabbar (Lakers) (27.1 PPG)

Awards
- MVP: Moses Malone (76ers)

The 1983 NBA playoffs was the postseason tournament of the National Basketball Association's 1982–83 season. This was the final postseason using the 12-team format and best of 3 series in the first round, before the NBA expanded the postseason to include 16 teams and changed the first round to best of 5 series the following season. The tournament concluded with the Eastern Conference champion Philadelphia 76ers defeating the defending NBA champion and Western Conference champion Los Angeles Lakers 4 games to 0 in the NBA Finals. Moses Malone was named NBA Finals MVP.

Malone made a famous prediction about the Sixers' chances prior to the playoffs, saying "Fo', fo', fo'" – predicting the number of games the Sixers would need to win each of the three series they would play on the way to a championship. They nearly accomplished this prediction of a sweep of all three rounds, only losing one game (to Milwaukee in the Eastern Conference Finals) en route to the championship. The Sixers set a record for highest winning percentage in the playoffs that was not broken until the Lakers went 15–1 in 2001. The Lakers' mark, however, came after the expansion to the current 16-team, four-round playoff format, which was first implemented in the 1984 playoffs, while the Sixers avoided the first round by virtue of their top seeding.

It was the third time in four years that the Lakers and 76ers had met in the NBA Finals, with the Lakers winning the previous two series.

After missing the playoffs the previous year, the Blazers began a string of 21 straight playoff appearances in 1983 lasting until 2003. They made the playoffs 25 out of 26 years from their title-winning season of 1977–2003. The record was just one season shy of the 22-year playoff run set by the Syracuse Nationals/Philadelphia 76ers from 1950–1971.

The Celtics were swept out of the playoffs for the first time in team history, losing 4–0 to the Bucks in the second round.

This was the Spurs' last appearance in the Conference Finals until 1995. However, for players such as George Gervin and Artis Gilmore, the 6-game loss to the Lakers was the last chance they got at reaching the NBA Finals, let alone an NBA Championship (Gilmore did return to the conference finals with the Celtics in 1988, but played sparingly).

This was the only season of the 12-team playoff bracket in which all four division champions advanced to the conference finals.

== Bracket ==
First Round
E4	New Jersey	0
E5	New York	2
E3	Boston	2
E6	Atlanta	1
W4	Seattle	0
W5	Portland	2
W3	Phoenix	1
W6	Denver	2

Conference Semifinals
E1	Philadelphia*	4
E5	New York	0
Eastern Conference
E3	Boston	0
E2	Milwaukee*	4
W1	Los Angeles*	4
W5	Portland	1
Western Conference
W6	Denver	1
W2	San Antonio*	4

Conference Finals
E1	Philadelphia*	4
E2	Milwaukee*	1
W1	Los Angeles*	4
W2	San Antonio*	2

NBA Finals
E1	Philadelphia*	4
W1	Los Angeles*	0

- * Division winner
- Bold Series winner
- Italic Team with home-court advantage

== First round ==
=== Eastern Conference first round ===
==== (3) Boston Celtics vs. (6) Atlanta Hawks ====
April 19

Boxscore

Atlanta Hawks 95, Boston Celtics 103
Scoring by quarter: 22–22, 23–26, 25–24, 25–31
Pts: Dan Roundfield 24; Rebs: Dan Roundfield 20; Asts: Johnny Davis 11	Pts: Larry Bird 26; Rebs: Robert Parish 16; Asts: Tiny Archibald 11
Boston leads series, 1–0

Boston Garden, Boston, Massachusetts
Attendance: 15,320

April 22

Boxscore

Boston Celtics 93, Atlanta Hawks 95
Scoring by quarter: 20–28, 22–27, 24–14, 27–26
Pts: Robert Parish 17; Rebs: Larry Bird 16; Asts: Larry Bird 9	Pts: Dan Roundfield 19; Rebs: Tree Rollins 14; Asts: Johnny Davis 14
Series tied, 1–1

Omni Coliseum, Atlanta, Georgia
Attendance: 10,405

CBS

April 24

Boxscore

Atlanta Hawks 79, Boston Celtics 98
Scoring by quarter: 23–32, 22–27, 17–19, 17–20
Pts: Tree Rollins 18; Rebs: Dan Roundfield 10; Asts: three players 3 each	Pts: Larry Bird 26; Rebs: Robert Parish 11; Asts: Larry Bird 9
Boston wins series, 2–1

Boston Garden, Boston, Massachusetts
Attendance: 15,320

- In the decisive Game 3, Hawks center Tree Rollins and Celtics guard Danny Ainge started a melee on the Boston Garden floor in which Rollins bit Ainge's finger.

Regular-season series
Boston won 5–1 in the regular-season series

October 30, 1982

Recap

Boston Celtics 112, Atlanta Hawks 97

The Omni, Atlanta

December 1, 1982

Recap

Atlanta Hawks 97, Boston Celtics 122

Boston Garden, Boston

December 18, 1982

Recap

Boston Celtics 107, Atlanta Hawks 103 (OT)

The Omni, Atlanta

February 6, 1983

Recap

Atlanta Hawks 116, Boston Celtics 111

Boston Garden, Boston

March 23, 1983

Recap

Atlanta Hawks 102, Boston Celtics 114

Boston Garden, Boston

April 5, 1983

Recap

Boston Celtics 117, Atlanta Hawks 95

The Omni, Atlanta

This was the seventh playoff meeting between these two teams, with the Celtics winning five of the first six meetings.

Previous playoff series
Boston leads 5–1 in all-time playoff series

1957

Boston Celtics 4, St. Louis Hawks 3

1957 NBA Finals

1958

Boston Celtics 2, St. Louis Hawks 4

1958 NBA Finals

1960

Boston Celtics 4, St. Louis Hawks 3

1960 NBA Finals

1961

Boston Celtics 4, St. Louis Hawks 1

1961 NBA Finals

1972

Atlanta Hawks 2, Boston Celtics 4

1972 Eastern Conference Semifinals

1973

Atlanta Hawks 2, Boston Celtics 4

1973 Eastern Conference Semifinals

==== (4) New Jersey Nets vs. (5) New York Knicks ====
April 20

Boxscore

New York Knicks 118, New Jersey Nets 107
Scoring by quarter: 35–27, 23–23, 31–26, 29–31
Pts: Bernard King 40; Rebs: Marvin Webster 11; Asts: Rory Sparrow 7	Pts: Albert King 17; Rebs: Buck Williams 13; Asts: Cook, Birdsong 6 each
New York leads series, 1–0

Brendan Byrne Arena, East Rutherford, New Jersey
Attendance: 15,672
Referees: Jake Madden, Jess Kersey, Joe Crawford

April 21

Boxscore

New Jersey Nets 99, New York Knicks 105
Scoring by quarter: 23–32, 16–30, 31–18, 29–25
Pts: Albert King 25; Rebs: Buck Williams 10; Asts: Foots Walker 6	Pts: Truck Robinson 22; Rebs: Truck Robinson 13; Asts: Paul Westphal 7
New York wins series, 2–0

Madison Square Garden, New York City, New York
Attendance: 19,591

Regular-season series
New Jersey won 4–2 in the regular-season series

November 9, 1982

Recap

New Jersey Nets 84, New York Knicks 82

Madison Square Garden, New York City

November 10, 1982

Recap

New York Knicks 90, New Jersey Nets 99

Brendan Byrne Arena, East Rutherford, New Jersey

December 25, 1982

Recap

New Jersey Nets 112, New York Knicks 110 (OT)

Madison Square Garden, New York City

January 15, 1983

Recap

New York Knicks 96, New Jersey Nets 100

Brendan Byrne Arena, East Rutherford, New Jersey

March 9, 1983

Recap

New York Knicks 103, New Jersey Nets 92

Brendan Byrne Arena, East Rutherford, New Jersey

April 13, 1983

Recap

New Jersey Nets 100, New York Knicks 108

Madison Square Garden, New York City

This was the first playoff meeting between the Knicks and the Nets.

=== Western Conference first round ===
==== (3) Phoenix Suns vs. (6) Denver Nuggets ====
April 19

Boxscore

Denver Nuggets 108, Phoenix Suns 121
Scoring by quarter: 32–23, 24–39, 21–28, 31–31
Pts: Kiki VanDeWeghe 32; Rebs: T. R. Dunn 12; Asts: English, Evans 4 each	Pts: Dennis Johnson 28; Rebs: Dennis Johnson 12; Asts: Dennis Johnson 8
Phoenix leads series, 1–0

Arizona Veterans Memorial Coliseum, Phoenix, Arizona
Attendance: 11,901

April 21

Boxscore

Phoenix Suns 99, Denver Nuggets 113
Scoring by quarter: 22–27, 26–35, 26–25, 25–26
Pts: Walter Davis 31; Rebs: James Edwards 9 Asts: Dennis Johnson 5	Pts: Kiki VanDeWeghe 26; Rebs: Dan Issel 11; Asts: Rob Williams 9
Series tied, 1–1

McNichols Sports Arena, Denver, Colorado
Attendance: 15,903

April 24

Boxscore

Denver Nuggets 117, Phoenix Suns 112 (OT)
Scoring by quarter: 29–31, 30–27, 28–32, 19–16, Overtime: 11–6
Pts: Alex English 42; Rebs: T. R. Dunn 12; Asts: Dunn, Williams 6 each	Pts: Walter Davis 29; Rebs: Larry Nance 12; Asts: Alvan Adams 9
Denver wins series, 2–1

Arizona Veterans Memorial Coliseum, Phoenix, Arizona
Attendance: 14,660

- Mike Evans hits the game-tying 3-pointer with 37 seconds left to force OT.

Regular-season series
Denver won 4–1 in the regular-season series

October 31, 1982

Recap

Phoenix Suns 110, Denver Nuggets 114

McNichols Sports Arena, Denver, Colorado

November 18, 1982

Recap

Denver Nuggets 118, Phoenix Suns 107

Arizona Veterans Memorial Coliseum, Phoenix, Arizona

January 1, 1983

Recap

Phoenix Suns 125, Denver Nuggets 127

McNichols Sports Arena, Denver, Colorado

March 22, 1983

Recap

Phoenix Suns 117, Denver Nuggets 130

McNichols Sports Arena, Denver, Colorado

March 26, 1983

Recap

Denver Nuggets 110, Phoenix Suns 124

Arizona Veterans Memorial Coliseum, Phoenix, Arizona

This was the second playoff meeting between these two teams, with the Suns winning the first meeting.

Previous playoff series
Phoenix leads 1–0 in all-time playoff series

1982

Denver Nuggets 1, Phoenix Suns 2

1982 Western Conference First Round

==== (4) Seattle SuperSonics vs. (5) Portland Trail Blazers ====
April 20

Boxscore

Portland Trail Blazers 108, Seattle SuperSonics 97
Scoring by quarter: 31–26, 28–19, 27–29, 22–23
Pts: Thompson, Paxson 25 each Rebs: Calvin Natt 11; Asts: Mychal Thompson 8	Pts: Gus Williams 34; Rebs: Jack Sikma 15; Asts: Williams, Sikma 7 each
Portland leads series, 1–0

Seattle Center Coliseum, Seattle, Washington
Attendance: 9,211

April 22

Boxscore

Seattle SuperSonics 96, Portland Trail Blazers 105
Scoring by quarter: 28–23, 15–31, 25–29, 28–22
Pts: Gus Williams 31; Rebs: Danny Vranes 18; Asts: Jack Sikma 4	Pts: Jim Paxson 26; Rebs: Mychal Thompson 12; Asts: Thompson, Lever 6 each
Portland wins series, 2–0

Memorial Coliseum, Portland, Oregon
Attendance: 12,666

Regular-season series
Tied 3–3 in the regular-season series

December 21, 1982

Recap

Portland Trail Blazers 94, Seattle SuperSonics 99

Kingdome, Seattle

December 25, 1982

Recap

Seattle SuperSonics 88, Portland Trail Blazers 95

Memorial Coliseum, Portland, Oregon

January 9, 1983

Recap

Seattle SuperSonics 101, Portland Trail Blazers 110

Memorial Coliseum, Portland, Oregon

January 14, 1983

Recap

Portland Trail Blazers 102, Seattle SuperSonics 99

Kingdome, Seattle

April 10, 1983

Recap

Seattle SuperSonics 102, Portland Trail Blazers 93

Memorial Coliseum, Portland, Oregon

April 12, 1983

Recap

Portland Trail Blazers 101, Seattle SuperSonics 106

Kingdome, Seattle

This was the third playoff meeting between these two teams, with the SuperSonics winning the first two meetings.

Previous playoff series
Seattle leads 2–0 in all-time playoff series

1978

Portland Trail Blazers 2, Seattle SuperSonics 4

1978 Western Conference Semifinals

1980

Portland Trail Blazers 1, Seattle SuperSonics 2

1980 Western Conference First Round

== Conference semifinals ==
=== Eastern Conference semifinals ===
==== (1) Philadelphia 76ers vs. (5) New York Knicks ====
April 24

Boxscore

New York Knicks 102, Philadelphia 76ers 112
Scoring by quarter: 24–32, 31–29, 21–26, 26–25
Pts: Bill Cartwright 17; Rebs: Bill Cartwright 8 Asts: Rory Sparrow 10	Pts: Moses Malone 38; Rebs: Moses Malone 17; Asts: Maurice Cheeks 10
Philadelphia leads series, 1–0

Spectrum, Philadelphia, Pennsylvania
Attendance: 14,375
Referees: Ed Rush, John Vanak

April 27

Boxscore

New York Knicks 91, Philadelphia 76ers 98
Scoring by quarter: 30–20, 29–21, 9–24, 23–33
Pts: Truck Robinson 22; Rebs: Truck Robinson 14; Asts: Rory Sparrow 8	Pts: Moses Malone 30; Rebs: Moses Malone 17; Asts: Maurice Cheeks 6
Philadelphia leads series, 2–0

Spectrum, Philadelphia, Pennsylvania
Attendance: 15,829
Referees: Darell Garretson, Joe Crawford

April 30

Boxscore

Philadelphia 76ers 107, New York Knicks 105
Scoring by quarter: 25–27, 27–24, 26–26, 29–28
Pts: Moses Malone 28; Rebs: Moses Malone 14; Asts: Maurice Cheeks 7	Pts: Bernard King 21; Rebs: Truck Robinson 15; Asts: Rory Sparrow 6
Philadelphia leads series, 3–0

Madison Square Garden, New York City, New York
Attendance: 17,735
Referees: Hugh Evans, Wally Rooney, Dick Bavetta

May 1

Boxscore

Philadelphia 76ers 105, New York Knicks 102
Scoring by quarter: 27–27, 29–21, 21–27, 28–27
Pts: Moses Malone 29; Rebs: Moses Malone 14; Asts: Maurice Cheeks 7	Pts: Bernard King 35; Rebs: Truck Robinson 15; Asts: Sparrow, Westphal 8 each
Philadelphia wins series, 4–0

Madison Square Garden, New York City, New York
Attendance: 15,457
Referees: Earl Strom, Hue Hollins, Lee Jones

Regular-season series
Philadelphia won 5–1 in the regular-season series

October 29, 1982

Recap

Philadelphia 76ers 104, New York Knicks 89

Madison Square Garden, New York City

December 17, 1982

Recap

New York Knicks 95, Philadelphia 76ers 109

Spectrum, Philadelphia

February 20, 1983

Recap

New York Knicks 89, Philadelphia 76ers 104

Spectrum, Philadelphia

March 1, 1983

Recap

Philadelphia 76ers 106, New York Knicks 94

Madison Square Garden, New York City

March 22, 1983

Recap

Philadelphia 76ers 76, New York Knicks 89

Madison Square Garden, New York City

April 10, 1983

Recap

New York Knicks 97, Philadelphia 76ers 113

Spectrum, Philadelphia

This was the eighth playoff meeting between these two teams, with the 76ers winning five of the first seven meetings.

Previous playoff series
Philadelphia leads 5–2 in all-time playoff series

1950

New York Knicks 1, Syracuse Nationals 2

1950 Eastern Division Finals

1951

New York Knicks 3, Syracuse Nationals 2

1951 Eastern Division Finals

1952

New York Knicks 3, Syracuse Nationals 1

1952 Eastern Division Finals

1954

New York Knicks 0, Syracuse Nationals 2

1954 Eastern Division Round Robin Semifinals

1959

New York Knicks 0, Syracuse Nationals 2

1959 Eastern Division Semifinals

1968

New York Knicks 2, Philadelphia 76ers 4

1968 Eastern Division Semifinals

1978

New York Knicks 0, Philadelphia 76ers 4

1978 Eastern Conference Semifinals

==== (2) Milwaukee Bucks vs. (3) Boston Celtics ====
April 27

Boxscore

Milwaukee Bucks 116, Boston Celtics 95
Scoring by quarter: 23–24, 31–24, 32–24, 30–23
Pts: Sidney Moncrief 22; Rebs: Bob Lanier 10; Asts: Marques Johnson 5	Pts: Tiny Archibald 23; Rebs: Parish, Maxwell 12 each Asts: Tiny Archibald 7
Milwaukee leads series, 1–0

Boston Garden, Boston, Massachusetts
Attendance: 15,320

April 29

Boxscore

Milwaukee Bucks 95, Boston Celtics 91
Scoring by quarter: 22–28, 20–29, 32–25, 21–9
Pts: Sidney Moncrief 20; Rebs: Marques Johnson 9 Asts: Sidney Moncrief 4	Pts: Danny Ainge 25; Rebs: Robert Parish 10; Asts: Gerald Henderson 8
Milwaukee leads series, 2–0

Boston Garden, Boston, Massachusetts
Attendance: 15,320

May 1

Boxscore

Boston Celtics 99, Milwaukee Bucks 107
Scoring by quarter: 34–27, 22–30, 25–26, 18–24
Pts: Larry Bird 21; Rebs: Larry Bird 14; Asts: Maxwell, Bird 6 each	Pts: Sidney Moncrief 26; Rebs: Junior Bridgeman 10; Asts: Bob Lanier 6
Milwaukee leads series, 3–0

MECCA Arena, Milwaukee, Wisconsin
Attendance: 11,052
Referees: Walter Rooney, Jess Kersey

May 2

Boxscore

Boston Celtics 93, Milwaukee Bucks 107
Scoring by quarter: 19–23, 18–23, 26–29, 30–32
Pts: Larry Bird 18; Rebs: Larry Bird 11; Asts: Larry Bird 8	Pts: Marques Johnson 33; Rebs: Alton Lister 11; Asts: Marques Johnson 6
Milwaukee wins series, 4–0

MECCA Arena, Milwaukee, Wisconsin
Attendance: 11,052

- First time the Celtics were swept in a playoff series since 1954.

Regular-season series
Tied 3–3 in the regular-season series

November 10, 1982

Recap

Milwaukee Bucks 105, Boston Celtics 101

Boston Garden, Boston

November 14, 1982

Recap

Boston Celtics 100, Milwaukee Bucks 98

MECCA Arena, Milwaukee

November 28, 1982

Recap

Milwaukee Bucks 109, Boston Celtics 124

Boston Garden, Boston

December 3, 1982

Recap

Boston Celtics 112, Milwaukee Bucks 115

MECCA Arena, Milwaukee

March 22, 1983

Recap

Boston Celtics 108, Milwaukee Bucks 116

MECCA Arena, Milwaukee

April 1, 1983

Recap

Milwaukee Bucks 83, Boston Celtics 97

Boston Garden, Boston

This was the second playoff meeting between these two teams, with the Celtics winning the first meeting.

Previous playoff series
Boston leads 1–0 in all-time playoff series

1974

Boston Celtics 4, Milwaukee Bucks 3

1974 NBA Finals

=== Western Conference semifinals ===
==== (1) Los Angeles Lakers vs. (5) Portland Trail Blazers ====
April 24

Boxscore

Portland Trail Blazers 97, Los Angeles Lakers 118
Scoring by quarter: 23–36, 30–26, 28–26, 16–30
Pts: Mychal Thompson 22; Rebs: Thompson, Natt 9 each Asts: three players 7 each	Pts: Kareem Abdul-Jabbar 32; Rebs: Johnson, Rambis 9 each Asts: Magic Johnson 18
Los Angeles leads series, 1–0

The Forum, Inglewood, California
Attendance: 13,891

April 26

Boxscore

Portland Trail Blazers 106, Los Angeles Lakers 112
Scoring by quarter: 32–37, 26–20, 31–28, 17–27
Pts: Calvin Natt 26; Rebs: Wayne Cooper 7 Asts: Darnell Valentine 15	Pts: Kareem Abdul-Jabbar 37; Rebs: Jamaal Wilkes 9 Asts: Kareem Abdul-Jabbar 7
Los Angeles leads series, 2–0

The Forum, Inglewood, California
Attendance: 16,239

April 29

Boxscore

Los Angeles Lakers 115, Portland Trail Blazers 109 (OT)
Scoring by quarter: 32–28, 22–19, 18–28, 26–23, Overtime: 17–11
Pts: Kareem Abdul-Jabbar 30; Rebs: Jamaal Wilkes 9 Asts: Magic Johnson 11	Pts: Paxson, Natt 22 each Rebs: Natt, Cooper 10 each Asts: Darnell Valentine 14
Los Angeles leads series, 3–0

Memorial Coliseum, Portland, Oregon
Attendance: 12,666

May 1

Boxscore

Los Angeles Lakers 95, Portland Trail Blazers 108
Scoring by quarter: 19–31, 29–35, 28–22, 19–20
Pts: Kareem Abdul-Jabbar 34; Rebs: Kareem Abdul-Jabbar 9 Asts: Magic Johnson 8	Pts: Jim Paxson 20; Rebs: Calvin Natt 10; Asts: Darnell Valentine 11
Los Angeles leads series, 3–1

Memorial Coliseum, Portland, Oregon
Attendance: 12,666
Referees: Darell Garretson, Mike Mathis, Tommy Nuñez

May 3

Boxscore

Portland Trail Blazers 108, Los Angeles Lakers 116
Scoring by quarter: 25–39, 17–27, 24–24, 42–26
Pts: Jim Paxson 32; Rebs: Calvin Natt 11; Asts: Darnell Valentine 8	Pts: Norm Nixon 36; Rebs: Kareem Abdul-Jabbar 11; Asts: Magic Johnson 15
Los Angeles wins series, 4–1

The Forum, Inglewood, California
Attendance: 16,739
Referees: John Vanak, Ed Rush

Regular-season series
Tied 3–3 in the regular-season series

November 7, 1982

Recap

Portland Trail Blazers 89, Los Angeles Lakers 103

The Forum, Inglewood, California

December 3, 1982

Recap

Portland Trail Blazers 100, Los Angeles Lakers 115

The Forum, Inglewood, California

December 14, 1982

Recap

Los Angeles Lakers 103, Portland Trail Blazers 107

Memorial Coliseum, Portland, Oregon

January 25, 1983

Recap

Los Angeles Lakers 125, Portland Trail Blazers 120

Memorial Coliseum, Portland, Oregon

April 5, 1983

Recap

Los Angeles Lakers 101, Portland Trail Blazers 107

Memorial Coliseum, Portland, Oregon

April 17, 1983

Recap

Portland Trail Blazers 119, Los Angeles Lakers 108

The Forum, Inglewood, California

This was the second playoff meeting between these two teams, with the Trail Blazers winning the first meeting.

Previous playoff series
Portland leads 1–0 in all-time playoff series

1977

Los Angeles Lakers 0, Portland Trail Blazers 4

1977 Western Conference Finals

==== (2) San Antonio Spurs vs. (6) Denver Nuggets ====
April 26

Boxscore

Denver Nuggets 133, San Antonio Spurs 152
Scoring by quarter: 39–39, 29–43, 37–34, 28–36
Pts: Dan Issel 28; Rebs: T. R. Dunn 11; Asts: English, Williams 7 each	Pts: George Gervin 42; Rebs: Gene Banks 11; Asts: Johnny Moore 17
San Antonio leads series, 1–0

HemisFair Arena, San Antonio, Texas
Attendance: 10,116

April 27

Boxscore

Denver Nuggets 109, San Antonio Spurs 126
Scoring by quarter: 31–36, 32–34, 26–28, 20–28
Pts: Kiki VanDeWeghe 22; Rebs: T. R. Dunn 8 Asts: Mike Evans 9	Pts: George Gervin 30; Rebs: Artis Gilmore 12; Asts: Johnny Moore 20
San Antonio leads series, 2–0

HemisFair Arena, San Antonio, Texas
Attendance: 10,690

April 29

Boxscore

San Antonio Spurs 127, Denver Nuggets 126 (OT)
Scoring by quarter: 33–35, 27–27, 30–32, 28–24, Overtime: 9–8
Pts: Johnny Moore 39; Rebs: Artis Gilmore 14; Asts: Johnny Moore 12	Pts: Alex English 39; Rebs: Kiki VanDeWeghe 14; Asts: English, Williams 7 each
San Antonio leads series, 3–0

McNichols Sports Arena, Denver, Colorado
Attendance: 16,965

May 2

Boxscore

San Antonio Spurs 114, Denver Nuggets 124
Scoring by quarter: 29–40, 21–32, 35–26, 29–26
Pts: Johnny Moore 27; Rebs: Artis Gilmore 11; Asts: Johnny Moore 9	Pts: Kiki VanDeWeghe 37; Rebs: Kiki VanDeWeghe 11; Asts: Alex English 11
San Antonio leads series, 3–1

McNichols Sports Arena, Denver, Colorado
Attendance: 15,035

May 4

Boxscore

Denver Nuggets 105, San Antonio Spurs 145
Scoring by quarter: 21–35, 25–37, 29–40, 30–33
Pts: Billy McKinney 20; Rebs: T. R. Dunn 8 Asts: Mike Evans 6	Pts: George Gervin 26; Rebs: Artis Gilmore 15; Asts: Johnny Moore 13
San Antonio wins series, 4–1

HemisFair Arena, San Antonio, Texas
Attendance: 12,736
Referees: Earl Strom, Jess Kersey

Regular-season series
San Antonio won 4–2 in the regular-season series

November 23, 1982

Recap

Denver Nuggets 126, San Antonio Spurs 136

HemisFair Arena, San Antonio

November 24, 1982

Recap

San Antonio Spurs 123, Denver Nuggets 129

McNichols Sports Arena, Denver, Colorado

December 16, 1982

Recap

San Antonio Spurs 120, Denver Nuggets 108

McNichols Sports Arena, Denver, Colorado

January 18, 1983

Recap

Denver Nuggets 124, San Antonio Spurs 143

HemisFair Arena, San Antonio

March 8, 1983

Recap

San Antonio Spurs 118, Denver Nuggets 129

McNichols Sports Arena, Denver, Colorado

March 29, 1983

Recap

Denver Nuggets 129, San Antonio Spurs 136

HemisFair Arena, San Antonio

This was the first playoff meeting between the Nuggets and the Spurs.

== Conference finals ==
=== Eastern Conference finals ===
==== (1) Philadelphia 76ers vs. (2) Milwaukee Bucks ====
May 8

Boxscore

Milwaukee Bucks 109, Philadelphia 76ers 111 (OT)
Scoring by quarter: 23–35, 34–24, 24–26, 23–19, Overtime: 5–7
Pts: Marques Johnson 30; Rebs: Bob Lanier 9 Asts: Moncrief, Lanier 6 each	Pts: Maurice Cheeks 26; Rebs: Moses Malone 12; Asts: Maurice Cheeks 7
Philadelphia leads series, 1–0

Spectrum, Philadelphia, Pennsylvania
Attendance: 18,482
Referees: Darell Garretson, Mike Mathis

- Junior Bridgeman hits the game-tying shot with 42 seconds left to force OT.

May 11

Boxscore

Milwaukee Bucks 81, Philadelphia 76ers 87
Scoring by quarter: 18–20, 21–23, 22–28, 20–16
Pts: Marques Johnson 25; Rebs: Marques Johnson 11; Asts: Lanier, Winters 4 each	Pts: Moses Malone 26; Rebs: Moses Malone 17; Asts: Cheeks, Toney 4 each
Philadelphia leads series, 2–0

Spectrum, Philadelphia, Pennsylvania
Attendance: 18,482
Referees: Earl Strom, Ed Rush

May 14

Boxscore

Philadelphia 76ers 104, Milwaukee Bucks 96
Scoring by quarter: 23–28, 22–20, 26–24, 33–24
Pts: Julius Erving 26; Rebs: Moses Malone 14; Asts: Maurice Cheeks 9	Pts: Junior Bridgeman 24; Rebs: Sidney Moncrief 10; Asts: Brian Winters 7
Philadelphia leads series, 3–0

MECCA Arena, Milwaukee, Wisconsin
Attendance: 11,052
Referees: Jack Madden, Hugh Evans

May 15

Boxscore

Philadelphia 76ers 94, Milwaukee Bucks 100
Scoring by quarter: 23–21, 21–25, 29–25, 21–29
Pts: Andrew Toney 24; Rebs: Moses Malone 12; Asts: Maurice Cheeks 8	Pts: Marques Johnson 19; Rebs: Marques Johnson 10; Asts: Marques Johnson 8
Philadelphia leads series, 3–1

MECCA Arena, Milwaukee, Wisconsin
Attendance: 11,052
Referees: Jake O'Donnell, Jess Kersey

May 18

Boxscore

Milwaukee Bucks 103, Philadelphia 76ers 115
Scoring by quarter: 29–31, 25–28, 25–29, 24–27
Pts: Marques Johnson 21; Rebs: Alton Lister 12; Asts: Junior Bridgeman 5	Pts: Andrew Toney 30; Rebs: Moses Malone 17; Asts: Maurice Cheeks 8
Philadelphia wins series, 4–1

Spectrum, Philadelphia, Pennsylvania
Attendance: 18,482
Referees: Darell Garretson, Earl Strom

Regular-season series
Philadelphia won 5–1 in the regular-season series

November 19, 1982

Recap

Milwaukee Bucks 109, Philadelphia 76ers 121

Spectrum, Philadelphia

January 12, 1983

Recap

Milwaukee Bucks 121, Philadelphia 76ers 122

Spectrum, Philadelphia

January 23, 1983

Recap

Philadelphia 76ers 96, Milwaukee Bucks 107

MECCA Arena, Milwaukee

March 19, 1983

Recap

Philadelphia 76ers 105, Milwaukee Bucks 97

MECCA Arena, Milwaukee

March 23, 1983

Recap

Milwaukee Bucks 101, Philadelphia 76ers 104 (OT)

Spectrum, Philadelphia

April 5, 1983

Recap

Philadelphia 76ers 116, Milwaukee Bucks 108

MECCA Arena, Milwaukee

This was the fourth playoff meeting between these two teams, with the 76ers winning two of the first three meetings.

Previous playoff series
Philadelphia leads 2–1 in all-time playoff series

1970

Milwaukee Bucks 4, Philadelphia 76ers 1

1970 Eastern Division Semifinals

1981

Milwaukee Bucks 3, Philadelphia 76ers 4

1981 Eastern Conference Semifinals

1982

Milwaukee Bucks 2, Philadelphia 76ers 4

1982 Eastern Conference Semifinals

=== Western Conference finals ===
==== (1) Los Angeles Lakers vs. (2) San Antonio Spurs ====
May 8

Boxscore

San Antonio Spurs 107, Los Angeles Lakers 119
Scoring by quarter: 30–32, 31–26, 22–29, 24–32
Pts: Mike Mitchell 26; Rebs: George Gervin 9 Asts: Johnny Moore 18	Pts: Abdul-Jabbar, Nixon 30 each Rebs: three players 8 each Asts: Magic Johnson 12
Los Angeles leads series, 1–0

The Forum, Inglewood, California
Attendance: 15,063
Referees: Jack Madden, Hugh Evans

May 10

Boxscore

San Antonio Spurs 122, Los Angeles Lakers 113
Scoring by quarter: 35–26, 25–31, 37–32, 25–24
Pts: George Gervin 32; Rebs: Artis Gilmore 20; Asts: Johnny Moore 15	Pts: Johnson, Nixon 28 each Rebs: Magic Johnson 12; Asts: Norm Nixon 11
Series tied, 1–1

The Forum, Inglewood, California
Attendance: 17,505
Referees: Jake O'Donnell, Jess Kersey

May 13

Boxscore

Los Angeles Lakers 113, San Antonio Spurs 100
Scoring by quarter: 28–29, 24–24, 34–19, 27–28
Pts: Jamaal Wilkes 26; Rebs: Magic Johnson 11; Asts: Magic Johnson 13	Pts: Mike Mitchell 23; Rebs: Artis Gilmore 14; Asts: Johnny Moore 9
Los Angeles leads series, 2–1

HemisFair Arena, San Antonio, Texas
Attendance: 15,782

May 15

Boxscore

Los Angeles Lakers 129, San Antonio Spurs 121
Scoring by quarter: 36–29, 35–30, 27–37, 31–25
Pts: Magic Johnson 31; Rebs: Magic Johnson 8 Asts: Magic Johnson 17	Pts: Mike Mitchell 35; Rebs: Mike Mitchell 11; Asts: Johnny Moore 17
Los Angeles leads series, 3–1

HemisFair Arena, San Antonio, Texas
Attendance: 15,782
Referees: Earl Strom, Ed Rush

May 18

Boxscore

San Antonio Spurs 117, Los Angeles Lakers 112
Scoring by quarter: 31–34, 31–29, 33–28, 22–21
Pts: Mike Mitchell 26; Rebs: Artis Gilmore 14; Asts: Johnny Moore 17	Pts: Kareem Abdul-Jabbar 30; Rebs: Magic Johnson 11; Asts: Magic Johnson 19
Los Angeles leads series, 3–2

The Forum, Inglewood, California
Attendance: 17,505
Referees: Jake O'Donnell, Jack Madden

May 20

Boxscore

Los Angeles Lakers 101, San Antonio Spurs 100
Scoring by quarter: 29–26, 35–29, 22–26, 15–19
Pts: Kareem Abdul-Jabbar 28; Rebs: Magic Johnson 15; Asts: Magic Johnson 16	Pts: George Gervin 25; Rebs: Artis Gilmore 18; Asts: Johnny Moore 14
Los Angeles wins series, 4–2

HemisFair Arena, San Antonio, Texas
Attendance: 15,782

Regular-season series
San Antonio won 4–1 in the regular-season series

November 30, 1982
(completed April 13, 1983)

Recap

Los Angeles Lakers 114, San Antonio Spurs 117

HemisFair Arena, San Antonio

January 21, 1983

Recap

San Antonio Spurs 110, Los Angeles Lakers 119

The Forum, Inglewood, California

February 15, 1983

Recap

San Antonio Spurs 124, Los Angeles Lakers 103

The Forum, Inglewood, California

March 25, 1983

Recap

San Antonio Spurs 132, Los Angeles Lakers 120

The Forum, Inglewood, California

April 13, 1983

Recap

Los Angeles Lakers 109, San Antonio Spurs 114

HemisFair Arena, San Antonio

This was the second playoff meeting between these two teams, with the Lakers winning the first meeting.

Previous playoff series
Los Angeles leads 1–0 in all-time playoff series

1982

Los Angeles Lakers 4, San Antonio Spurs 0

1982 Western Conference Finals

== NBA Finals: (E1) Philadelphia 76ers vs. (W1) Los Angeles Lakers ==
May 22

Boxscore

Los Angeles Lakers 107, Philadelphia 76ers 113
Scoring by quarter: 20–30, 37–24, 26–31, 24–28
Pts: Norm Nixon 26; Rebs: Mark Landsberger 10; Asts: Magic Johnson 11	Pts: Moses Malone 27; Rebs: Moses Malone 18; Asts: Julius Erving 9
Philadelphia leads series, 1–0

Spectrum, Philadelphia, Pennsylvania
Attendance: 18,482
Referees: Jack Madden, Ed T. Rush

May 26

Boxscore

Los Angeles Lakers 93, Philadelphia 76ers 103
Scoring by quarter: 29–26, 26–25, 20–28, 18–24
Pts: Kareem Abdul-Jabbar 23; Rebs: Magic Johnson 8 Asts: Magic Johnson 13	Pts: Moses Malone 24; Rebs: Moses Malone 12; Asts: Maurice Cheeks 8
Philadelphia leads series, 2–0

Spectrum, Philadelphia, Pennsylvania
Attendance: 18,482
Referees: Darell Garretson, John Vanak, Earl Strom

May 29

Boxscore

Philadelphia 76ers 111, Los Angeles Lakers 94
Scoring by quarter: 21–32, 28–20, 23–20, 39–22
Pts: Moses Malone 28; Rebs: Moses Malone 19; Asts: Moses Malone 6	Pts: Kareem Abdul-Jabbar 23; Rebs: Kareem Abdul-Jabbar 15; Asts: Magic Johnson 13
Philadelphia leads series, 3–0

The Forum, Inglewood, California
Attendance: 17,505
Referees: Jess Kersey, Jake O'Donnell

May 31

Boxscore

Philadelphia 76ers 115, Los Angeles Lakers 108
Scoring by quarter: 24–26, 27–39, 31–28, 33–15
Pts: Moses Malone 24; Rebs: Moses Malone 23; Asts: Andrew Toney 9	Pts: Kareem Abdul-Jabbar 28; Rebs: four players 7 each Asts: Magic Johnson 15
Philadelphia wins series, 4–0

The Forum, Inglewood, California
Attendance: 17,505
Referees: Hugh Evans, Earl Strom, Jess Kersey

Regular-season series
Philadelphia won 2–0 in the regular-season series

December 5, 1982

Recap

Philadelphia 76ers 114, Los Angeles Lakers 104

The Forum, Inglewood, California

January 5, 1983

Recap

Los Angeles Lakers 120, Philadelphia 76ers 122 (OT)

Spectrum, Philadelphia

This was the fifth playoff meeting between these two teams, with the Lakers winning the first four meetings.

Previous playoff series
Los Angeles leads 4–0 in all-time playoff series

1950

Minneapolis Lakers 4, Syracuse Nationals 2

1950 NBA Finals

1954

Minneapolis Lakers 4, Syracuse Nationals 3

1954 NBA Finals

1980

Los Angeles Lakers 4, Philadelphia 76ers 2

1980 NBA Finals

1982

Los Angeles Lakers 4, Philadelphia 76ers 2

1982 NBA Finals
