= 1984–85 NBA season =

39th NBA season

- League: National Basketball Association
- Sport: Basketball
- Duration: October 26, 1984 – April 14, 1985; April 17 – May 22, 1985 (Playoffs); May 27 – June 9, 1985 (Finals)
- Teams: 23
- TV partner(s): CBS, TBS

Draft
- Top draft pick: Akeem Olajuwon
- Picked by: Houston Rockets

Regular season
- Top seed: Boston Celtics
- Season MVP: Larry Bird (Boston)
- Top scorer: Bernard King (New York)

Playoffs
- Eastern champions: Boston Celtics
- Eastern runners-up: Philadelphia 76ers
- Western champions: Los Angeles Lakers
- Western runners-up: Denver Nuggets

Finals
- Champions: Los Angeles Lakers
- Runners-up: Boston Celtics
- Finals MVP: Kareem Abdul-Jabbar (L.A. Lakers)

NBA seasons
- ← 1983–84 1985–86 →

The 1984–85 NBA season was the 39th season of the National Basketball Association. The season ended with the Los Angeles Lakers winning the NBA championship, beating the Boston Celtics 4 games to 2 in the NBA Finals. This was David Stern's first full season as commissioner.

== Notable occurrences ==
- The 1985 NBA All-Star Game was played at Hoosier Dome in Indianapolis, with the West defeating the East 140–129. Ralph Sampson of the Houston Rockets won the game's MVP award. Dominique Wilkins of the Atlanta Hawks won the Slam Dunk Contest.
- Michael Jordan became the first rookie in NBA history to lead a team in four statistics (points, assists, rebounds, steals). No other rookie would do so until Victor Wembanyama led the 2023–24 San Antonio Spurs in points, rebounds, steals, and blocks.
- The Clippers relocated from San Diego to Los Angeles. This created a situation with two teams of the same host name (the other Los Angeles team being the Lakers) in the same division, the Pacific, similar to the one in the NHL where the Patrick Division (at the time, and now the Metropolitan Division) had two teams of the same host name: the New York Islanders and Rangers. There was a similar scenario which only existed in the 1976–77 season, in which the Atlantic Division had the New York Knicks and the Nets, until the Nets moved to New Jersey the following season and changed their name.
- Turner Broadcasting began a relationship with the NBA that continued until the 2025 season when TBS signed a two-year, $20 million deal with the NBA.
- The Kings played their final game in Kansas City, Missouri, and moved their franchise to Sacramento the following season.
- Knicks forward Bernard King, who finished the season as the scoring champion, ruptured his ACL in his right knee in the Knicks' final game in Kansas City before the Kings' move to Sacramento. King was out of action for two whole seasons. He would come back in 1987–88, but would not return to the All-Star Game until 1990–91.
- This season marked Michael Jordan's, Akeem Olajuwon's, Charles Barkley's and John Stockton's rookie seasons in the NBA.
- This season saw the final season for Dan Issel, Billy Knight, M.L. Carr and Lionel Hollins.
- Due to a roof collapse at the Pontiac Silverdome, the Pistons were forced to rent the Joe Louis Arena, home of the NHL's Detroit Red Wings, for the remainder of the season and into the playoffs. Both the Pistons and the Red Wings would move their home games to the Little Caesars Arena, starting in 2017.
- At age 38, Kareem Abdul-Jabbar became the oldest player to win the honor of Finals MVP. Jabbar's team, the Lakers, became the first visiting team to win the NBA title at Boston Garden, beating their archrivals, the Boston Celtics, in six games.
- The Finals adopted the 2–3–2 format which was used through the 2013 NBA Finals after which the league returned to the 2–2–1–1–1 format.
- The Cleveland Cavaliers returned to the playoffs after a seven-year absence. They were eliminated by the Celtics in four games. They would not make the playoffs again until 1988. The Cavaliers were coached by George Karl, then making his NBA coaching debut.
- At New Orleans' Lakefront Arena (where the Atlanta Hawks played 12 of 41 home games that season), Larry Bird scored a Celtics' franchise record 60 points in Boston's 126–115 victory over the Hawks on March 12. Bird broke the previous franchise record set by teammate Kevin McHale (56) nine days earlier at Boston Garden against the Pistons.
- The Denver Nuggets made the conference finals for the first time since 1978, losing 4–1 to the Lakers. They would not make the conference finals again until 2009, which they lost to the Lakers again. The series marked the end of Dan Issel's playing career, having played 15 professional seasons and averaging 22.6 points and 9.1 rebounds in his career.
- This was the last season of the backboard height set at 48 in (1.219 m). It would be shortened 6 in (15.2 cm) next season to the current 42 in (1.067 m). The NBA logo is added on the lower left hand corner of the backboard starting this season.

Coaching changes
Offseason
Team	1983–84 coach	1984–85 coach
Cleveland Cavaliers	Tom Nissalke	George Karl
Indiana Pacers	Jack McKinney	George Irvine
Kansas City Kings	Cotton Fitzsimmons	Jack McKinney
San Antonio Spurs	Bob Bass	Cotton Fitzsimmons
In-season
Team	Outgoing coach	Incoming coach
Los Angeles Clippers	Jim Lynam	Don Chaney
Kansas City Kings	Jack McKinney	Phil Johnson

== Final standings ==
=== By division ===
Atlantic Division	W	L	PCT	GB	Home	Road	Div
y-Boston Celtics	63	19	.768	–	35–6	28–13	19–5
x-Philadelphia 76ers	58	24	.707	5	34–7	24–17	15–9
x-New Jersey Nets	42	40	.512	21	27–14	15–26	13–11
x-Washington Bullets	40	42	.488	23	28–13	12–29	11–13
New York Knicks	24	58	.293	39	19–22	5–36	2–22

Central Division	W	L	PCT	GB	Home	Road	Div
y-Milwaukee Bucks	59	23	.720	–	36–5	23–18	20–10
x-Detroit Pistons	46	36	.561	13	26–15	20–21	21–8
x-Chicago Bulls	38	44	.463	21	26–15	12–29	13–17
x-Cleveland Cavaliers	36	46	.439	23	20–21	16–25	13–16
Atlanta Hawks	34	48	.415	25	19–22	15–26	15–15
Indiana Pacers	22	60	.268	37	16–25	6–35	7–23

Midwest Division	W	L	PCT	GB	Home	Road	Div
y-Denver Nuggets	52	30	.634	–	34–7	18–23	17–13
x-Houston Rockets	48	34	.585	4	29–12	19–22	20–10
x-Dallas Mavericks	44	38	.537	8	24–17	20–21	14–16
x-Utah Jazz	41	41	.500	11	26–15	15–26	19–11
x-San Antonio Spurs	41	41	.500	11	30–11	11–30	12–18
Kansas City Kings	31	51	.378	21	23–18	8–33	8–22

Pacific Division	W	L	PCT	GB	Home	Road	Div
y-Los Angeles Lakers	62	20	.756	–	36–5	26–15	18–12
x-Portland Trail Blazers	42	40	.512	20	33–8	15–26	17–13
x-Phoenix Suns	36	46	.439	26	32–9	10–31	14–16
Seattle SuperSonics	31	51	.378	31	31–10	10–31	16–14
Los Angeles Clippers	31	51	.378	31	27–14	10–31	13–17
Golden State Warriors	22	60	.268	40	25–16	5–36	12–18

=== By conference ===
#	Eastern Conference				
#	Team	W	L	PCT	GB
1	z-Boston Celtics	63	19	.768	–
2	y-Milwaukee Bucks	59	23	.720	4
3	x-Philadelphia 76ers	58	24	.707	5
4	x-Detroit Pistons	46	36	.561	17
5	x-New Jersey Nets	42	40	.512	21
6	x-Washington Bullets	40	42	.488	23
7	x-Chicago Bulls	38	44	.463	25
8	x-Cleveland Cavaliers	36	46	.439	27
9	Atlanta Hawks	34	48	.415	29
10	New York Knicks	24	58	.293	39
11	Indiana Pacers	22	60	.268	41

#	Western Conference				
#	Team	W	L	PCT	GB
1	c-Los Angeles Lakers	62	20	.756	–
2	y-Denver Nuggets	52	30	.634	10
3	x-Houston Rockets	48	34	.585	14
4	x-Dallas Mavericks	44	38	.537	18
5	x-Portland Trail Blazers	42	40	.512	20
6	x-Utah Jazz	41	41	.500	21
7	x-San Antonio Spurs	41	41	.500	21
8	x-Phoenix Suns	36	46	.439	26
9	Seattle SuperSonics	31	51	.378	31
10	Los Angeles Clippers	31	51	.378	31
11	Kansas City Kings	31	51	.378	31
12	Golden State Warriors	22	60	.268	40

Notes

- z – Clinched home court advantage for the entire playoffs
- c – Clinched home court advantage for the conference playoffs
- y – Clinched division title
- x – Clinched playoff spot

== Playoffs ==
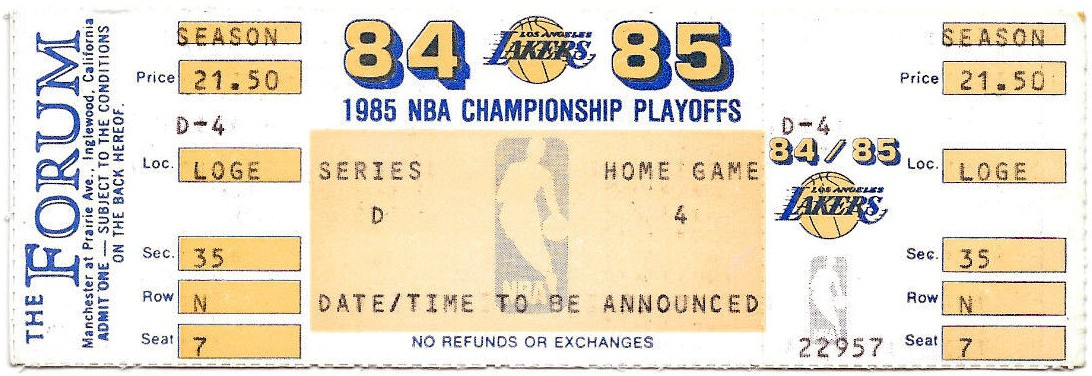
A ticket for Game 2 of the Western Conference Semifinals between the Lakers and the Trail Blazers.

Teams in bold advanced to the next round. The numbers to the left of each team indicate the team's seeding in its conference, and the numbers to the right indicate the number of games the team won in that round. The division champions are marked by an asterisk. Home court advantage does not necessarily belong to the higher-seeded team, but instead the team with the better regular season record; teams enjoying the home advantage are shown in italics.

First Rounds	Conference Semifinals
**E1**	**Boston***	**3**
E8	Cleveland	1
**E1**	**Boston***	**4**
E4	Detroit	2
**E4**	**Detroit**	**3**
E5	New Jersey	0
**Eastern Conference**
**E3**	**Philadelphia**	**3**
E6	Washington	1
**E3**	**Philadelphia**	**4**
E2	Milwaukee*	0
**E2**	**Milwaukee***	**3**
E7	Chicago	1
**W1**	**LA Lakers***	**3**
W8	Phoenix	0
**W1**	**LA Lakers***	**4**
W5	Portland	1
W4	Dallas	1
**W5**	**Portland**	**3**
**Western Conference**
W3	Houston	2
**W6**	**Utah**	**3**
W6	Utah	1
**W2**	**Denver***	**4**
**W2**	**Denver***	**3**
W7	San Antonio	2

Conference Finals
**E1**	**Boston***	**4**
E3	Philadelphia	1
**W1**	**LA Lakers***	**4**
W2	Denver*	1

NBA Finals
E1	Boston*	2
**W1**	**LA Lakers***	**4**

- * Division winner
- **Bold** Series winner
- Italic Team with home-court advantage

== Statistical leaders ==
=== Individual statistic leaders ===
Category	Player	Team(s)	Statistic
Points per game	Bernard King	New York Knicks	32.9
Rebounds per game	Moses Malone	Philadelphia 76ers	13.1
Assists per game	Isiah Thomas	Detroit Pistons	13.9
Steals per game	Michael Ray Richardson	New Jersey Nets	2.9
Blocks per game	Mark Eaton	Utah Jazz	5.6
Turnovers per game	Ralph Sampson	Houston Rockets	4.0
Fouls per game	Akeem Olajuwon	Houston Rockets	4.2
Minutes per game	Larry Bird	Boston Celtics	39.5
FG%	James Donaldson	Los Angeles Clippers	63.7%
FT%	Kyle Macy	Phoenix Suns	90.7%
3P%	Darrell Griffith	Utah Jazz	35.8%
Efficiency per game	Larry Bird	Boston Celtics	26.5
Double-doubles	Isiah Thomas	Detroit Pistons	65
Triple-doubles	Magic Johnson	Los Angeles Lakers	11

=== Individual game highs ===
Category	Player	Team	Statistic
Points	Larry Bird	Boston Celtics	60
Points	Bernard King	New York Knicks	60
Rebounds	Akeem Olajuwon	Houston Rockets	25
Assists	Isiah Thomas	Detroit Pistons	25
Steals	Fat Lever	Denver Nuggets	10
Steals	Johnny Moore	San Antonio Spurs	10
Blocks	Mark Eaton	Utah Jazz	14

== NBA awards ==
=== Yearly awards ===
- Most Valuable Player: Larry Bird, Boston Celtics
- Rookie of the Year: Michael Jordan, Chicago Bulls
- Defensive Player of the Year: Mark Eaton, Utah Jazz
- Sixth Man of the Year: Kevin McHale, Boston Celtics
- Coach of the Year: Don Nelson, Milwaukee Bucks

- All-NBA First Team:
  - F – Larry Bird, Boston Celtics
  - F – Bernard King, New York Knicks
  - C – Moses Malone, Philadelphia 76ers
  - G – Isiah Thomas, Detroit Pistons
  - G – Magic Johnson, Los Angeles Lakers
- All-NBA Second Team:
  - F – Terry Cummings, Milwaukee Bucks
  - F – Ralph Sampson, Houston Rockets
  - C – Kareem Abdul-Jabbar, Los Angeles Lakers
  - G – Michael Jordan, Chicago Bulls
  - G – Sidney Moncrief, Milwaukee Bucks

- All-NBA Rookie Team:
  - Charles Barkley (F), Philadelphia 76ers
  - Sam Perkins (F), Dallas Mavericks
  - Akeem Olajuwon (C), Houston Rockets
  - Sam Bowie (C), Portland Trail Blazers
  - Michael Jordan (G), Chicago Bulls

- NBA All-Defensive First Team:
  - Sidney Moncrief, Milwaukee Bucks
  - Paul Pressey, Milwaukee Bucks
  - Mark Eaton, Utah Jazz
  - Michael Cooper, Los Angeles Lakers
  - Maurice Cheeks, Philadelphia 76ers
- NBA All-Defensive Second Team:
  - Bobby Jones, Philadelphia 76ers
  - Danny Vranes, Seattle SuperSonics
  - Akeem Olajuwon, Houston Rockets
  - Dennis Johnson, Boston Celtics
  - T. R. Dunn, Denver Nuggets

=== Player of the week ===
The following players were named NBA Player of the Week.

Week	Player
Oct. 26 – Nov. 4	Larry Nance (Phoenix Suns)
Nov. 5 – Nov. 11	Alex English (Denver Nuggets)
Nov. 12 – Nov. 18	Moses Malone (Philadelphia 76ers)
Nov. 19 – Nov. 25	Bernard King (New York Knicks)
Nov. 26 – Dec. 2	Jack Sikma (Seattle SuperSonics)
Dec. 3 – Dec. 9	Orlando Woolridge (Chicago Bulls)
Dec. 10 – Dec. 16	Derek Smith (Los Angeles Clippers)
Dec. 17 – Dec. 23	Terry Cummings (Milwaukee Bucks)
Dec. 25 – Dec. 30	Micheal Ray Richardson (New Jersey Nets)
Jan. 1 – Jan. 6	Isiah Thomas (Detroit Pistons)
Jan. 7 – Jan. 13	World B. Free (Cleveland Cavaliers)
Jan. 14 – Jan. 20	Michael Jordan (Chicago Bulls)
Jan. 21 – Jan. 27	Tom McMillen (Washington Bullets)
Jan. 28 – Feb. 3	Dominique Wilkins (Atlanta Hawks)
Feb. 4 – Feb. 17	Magic Johnson (Los Angeles Lakers)
Feb. 18 – Feb. 24	Mark Aguirre (Dallas Mavericks)
Feb. 25 – Mar. 3	Sleepy Floyd (Golden State Warriors)
Mar. 4 – Mar. 10	Darrell Griffith (Utah Jazz)
Mar. 11 – Mar. 17	Larry Bird (Boston Celtics)
Mar. 18 – Mar. 24	Kareem Abdul-Jabbar (Los Angeles Lakers)
Mar. 25 – Mar. 31	Calvin Natt (Denver Nuggets)
Apr. 1 – Apr. 7	Derek Smith (Los Angeles Clippers)
Apr. 8 – Apr. 14	Micheal Ray Richardson (New Jersey Nets)

=== Player of the month ===
The following players were named NBA Player of the Month.

Month	Player
November	Alex English (Denver Nuggets)
December	Larry Bird (Boston Celtics)
January	Terry Cummings (Milwaukee Bucks)
February	Magic Johnson (Los Angeles Lakers)
March	Larry Bird (Boston Celtics)

=== Rookie of the month ===
The following players were named NBA Rookie of the Month.

Month	Rookie
November	Michael Jordan (Chicago Bulls)
December	Akeem Olajuwon (Houston Rockets)
January	Michael Jordan (Chicago Bulls)
February	Akeem Olajuwon (Houston Rockets)
March (tie)	Michael Jordan (Chicago Bulls)
March (tie)	Akeem Olajuwon (Houston Rockets)

=== Coach of the month ===
The following coaches were named NBA Coach of the Month.

Month	Coach
November	Doug Moe (Denver Nuggets)
December	Don Nelson (Milwaukee Bucks)
January	Chuck Daly (Detroit Pistons)
February	George Karl (Cleveland Cavaliers)
March	Pat Riley (Los Angeles Lakers)

== See also ==
- List of NBA regular season records
