= 1984–85 Phoenix Suns season =

NBA team season

- Head coach: John MacLeod
- General manager: Jerry Colangelo
- Owners: Karl Eller, Don Pitt, Don Diamond, Bhavik Darji, Marvin Meyer, Richard L. Bloch
- Arena: Arizona Veterans Memorial Coliseum

Results
- Record: 36–46 (.439)
- Place: Division: 3rd (Pacific); Conference: 8th (Western)
- Playoff finish: First round (lost to Lakers 0–3)
- Stats at Basketball Reference

Local media
- Television: KNXV-TV
- Radio: KTAR

The 1984–85 Phoenix Suns season was the 17th season for the Phoenix Suns of the National Basketball Association. The Suns were without All-Star Walter Davis for much of the season due to injury. They would be without him in the playoffs, extending a then-franchise record to eight consecutive seasons even though the Suns finished the regular season with the team's first losing record since the 1976–77 season. The Suns' playoff run would not last long, being swept in the first round of the Western Conference playoffs by the eventual league champions, the Los Angeles Lakers. The team was led by head coach John MacLeod, in his 12th year with the Suns, and played all home games in Arizona Veterans Memorial Coliseum.

Larry Nance would earn his first career All-Star selection, and led the Suns in scoring for the first time, averaging 20 points per game. He also tied with Maurice Lucas for team leader in rebounds, each averaging 8.8 on the season. Walter Davis was hampered by an injury, starting just nine games on the season and averaging only 15.0 points, while 7-footer James Edwards brought in 14.9 points per game.

== Offseason ==
=== NBA draft ===
Round	Pick	Player	Position	Nationality	College
1	13	Jay Humphries	Guard	United States	Colorado
2	36	Charles Jones	Forward	United States	Louisville
3	59	Murray Jarman	Forward	United States	Clemson
4	82	Jeff Collins	Guard	United States	UNLV
5	105	Bill Flye	Center	United States	Richmond
6	128	Herman Veal	Forward	United States	Maryland
7	151	Raymond Crenshaw	Forward	United States	Oklahoma State
8	174	Mark Fothergill	Forward	United States	Maryland
9	196	Buddy Cox	Forward	United States	Bellarmine
10	218	Ezra Hill	Guard	United States	Liberty Baptist

== Roster ==
1984–85 Phoenix Suns roster
Players

Pos.	No.	Player	Height	Weight	DOB	From
F/C	33	Alvan Adams	6 ft 9 in (2.06 m)	210 lb (95 kg)	1954-07-19	Oklahoma
G	6	Walter Davis (injured)	6 ft 6 in (1.98 m)	193 lb (88 kg)	1954-09-09	North Carolina
C	53	James Edwards (injured)	7 ft 0 in (2.13 m)	225 lb (102 kg)	1955-11-22	Washington
G	10	Rod Foster	6 ft 1 in (1.85 m)	160 lb (73 kg)	1960-10-10	UCLA
G	15	Michael Holton	6 ft 4 in (1.93 m)	185 lb (84 kg)	1961-08-04	UCLA
G	24	Jay Humphries	6 ft 3 in (1.91 m)	185 lb (84 kg)	1962-10-17	Colorado
F	34	Charles Jones	6 ft 8 in (2.03 m)	215 lb (98 kg)	1962-01-12	Louisville
F/C	20	Maurice Lucas	6 ft 9 in (2.06 m)	215 lb (98 kg)	1952-02-18	Marquette
G	4	Kyle Macy	6 ft 3 in (1.91 m)	175 lb (79 kg)	1957-04-09	Kentucky
F	22	Larry Nance (injured)	6 ft 10 in (2.08 m)	205 lb (93 kg)	1959-02-12	Clemson
F	32	Charles Pittman	6 ft 8 in (2.03 m)	220 lb (100 kg)	1958-03-23	Maryland
C	8	Rick Robey (injured)	6 ft 11 in (2.11 m)	230 lb (104 kg)	1956-01-30	Kentucky
F	11	Mike Sanders	6 ft 6 in (1.98 m)	210 lb (95 kg)	1960-05-07	UCLA
F	14	Alvin Scott	6 ft 7 in (2.01 m)	185 lb (84 kg)	1955-09-14	Oral Roberts

Coaches
Head coach
- John MacLeod (Bellarmine)
Assistant(s)
- Al Bianchi (Bowling Green)
- John Wetzel (Virginia Tech)

Legend
- (DP) Unsigned draft pick
- (FA) Free agent
- (S) Suspended
- Injured

== Regular season ==
=== Standings ===
Pacific Division	W	L	PCT	GB	Home	Road	Div
y-Los Angeles Lakers	62	20	.756	–	36–5	26–15	18–12
x-Portland Trail Blazers	42	40	.512	20	33–8	15–26	17–13
x-Phoenix Suns	36	46	.439	26	32–9	10–31	14–16
Seattle SuperSonics	31	51	.378	31	31–10	10–31	16–14
Los Angeles Clippers	31	51	.378	31	27–14	10–31	13–17
Golden State Warriors	22	60	.268	40	25–16	5–36	12–18

#	Western Conference				
#	Team	W	L	PCT	GB
1	c-Los Angeles Lakers	62	20	.756	–
2	y-Denver Nuggets	52	30	.634	10
3	x-Houston Rockets	48	34	.585	14
4	x-Dallas Mavericks	44	38	.537	18
5	x-Portland Trail Blazers	42	40	.512	20
6	x-Utah Jazz	41	41	.500	21
7	x-San Antonio Spurs	41	41	.500	21
8	x-Phoenix Suns	36	46	.439	26
9	Seattle SuperSonics	31	51	.378	31
10	Los Angeles Clippers	31	51	.378	31
11	Kansas City Kings	31	51	.378	31
12	Golden State Warriors	22	60	.268	40

=== Game log ===
1984–85 game log
Total: 36–46 (home: 26–15; road: 10–31)
October: 3–0 (home: 1–0; road: 2–0)

Game	Date	Team	Score	High points	High rebounds	High assists	Location Attendance	Record
1	October 26, 1984	@ Golden State	W 122–114				Oakland-Alameda County Coliseum Arena	1–0
2	October 28, 1984	@ Seattle	W 102–87				Kingdome	2–0
3	October 30, 1984	L.A. Clippers	W 99–96				Arizona Veterans Memorial Coliseum	3–0

November: 7–8 (home: 6–3; road: 1–5)

Game	Date	Team	Score	High points	High rebounds	High assists	Location Attendance	Record
4	November 1, 1984	Portland	W 139–130 (3OT)				Arizona Veterans Memorial Coliseum	4–0
5	November 3, 1984	@ Dallas	W 105–93				Reunion Arena	5–0
6	November 6, 1984	@ Portland	L 99–116				Memorial Coliseum	5–1
7	November 8, 1984	Cleveland	W 112–111				Arizona Veterans Memorial Coliseum	6–1
8	November 10, 1984	Atlanta	L 107–114				Arizona Veterans Memorial Coliseum	6–2
9	November 13, 1984	@ Denver	L 110–122				McNichols Sports Arena	6–3
10	November 14, 1984	New Jersey	W 98–86				Arizona Veterans Memorial Coliseum	7–3
11	November 16, 1984	Milwaukee	W 118–106				Arizona Veterans Memorial Coliseum	8–3
12	November 17, 1984	@ Utah	L 94–108				Salt Palace Acord Arena	8–4
13	November 20, 1984; 8:30 p.m. MST	@ L.A. Lakers	L 108–130	Humphries (15)	Lucas (6)	Humphries, Jones, Lucas (4)	The Forum; 13,792	8–5
14	November 21, 1984; 7:30 p.m. MST	L.A. Lakers	L 97–102	Nance (40)	Nance (13)	Macy (9)	Arizona Veterans Memorial Coliseum; 12,671	8–6
15	November 23, 1984	Philadelphia	L 117–119 (OT)				Arizona Veterans Memorial Coliseum	8–7
16	November 25, 1984	@ L.A. Clippers	L 109–114				Los Angeles Memorial Sports Arena	8–8
17	November 27, 1984	Utah	W 115–102				Arizona Veterans Memorial Coliseum	9–8
18	November 29, 1984	Chicago	W 100–95				Arizona Veterans Memorial Coliseum	10–8

December: 7–7 (home: 5–2; road: 2–5)

Game	Date	Team	Score	High points	High rebounds	High assists	Location Attendance	Record
19	December 1, 1984	Golden State	W 115–103				Arizona Veterans Memorial Coliseum	11–8
20	December 3, 1984	@ Seattle	L 96–108				Kingdome	11–9
21	December 4, 1984	@ Portland	L 104–112				Memorial Coliseum	11–10
22	December 7, 1984	Kansas City	W 121–113				Arizona Veterans Memorial Coliseum	12–10
23	December 8, 1984	@ Golden State	W 102–98				Oakland-Alameda County Coliseum Arena	13–10
24	December 11, 1984	Houston	W 120–112				Arizona Veterans Memorial Coliseum	14–10
25	December 13, 1984	Washington	W 116–86				Arizona Veterans Memorial Coliseum	15–10
26	December 15, 1984	@ San Antonio	L 111–120				HemisFair Arena	15–11
27	December 18, 1984	@ Kansas City	L 116–127				Kemper Arena	15–12
28	December 21, 1984; 8:30 p.m. MST	@ L.A. Lakers	L 105–119	Nance (25)	Adams, Lucas (10)	Humphries (8)	The Forum; 14,764	14–14
29	December 22, 1984	Portland	W 110–108				Arizona Veterans Memorial Coliseum	15–14
30	December 26, 1984	Boston	L 114–119				Arizona Veterans Memorial Coliseum	16–14
31	December 28, 1984	Dallas	L 111–125				Arizona Veterans Memorial Coliseum	16–15
32	December 30, 1984	@ L.A. Clippers	W 117–109				Los Angeles Memorial Sports Arena	17–15

January: 5–10 (home: 4–2; road: 1–8)

Game	Date	Team	Score	High points	High rebounds	High assists	Location Attendance	Record
33	January 2, 1985	@ Kansas City	W 115–107				Kemper Arena	18–15
34	January 4, 1985	@ New Jersey	L 98–105				Brendan Byrne Arena	18–16
35	January 5, 1985	@ Cleveland	L 106–111				Richfield Coliseum	18–17
36	January 7, 1985	@ Philadelphia	L 99–100				The Spectrum	18–18
37	January 9, 1985	Seattle	W 94–88				Arizona Veterans Memorial Coliseum	19–18
38	January 11, 1985	L.A. Clippers	L 84–98				Arizona Veterans Memorial Coliseum	19–19
39	January 12, 1985	Utah	W 109–94				Arizona Veterans Memorial Coliseum	20–19
40	January 16, 1985	Dallas	W 98–95				Arizona Veterans Memorial Coliseum	21–19
41	January 18, 1985	Houston	L 101–112				Arizona Veterans Memorial Coliseum	21–20
42	January 19, 1985	@ San Antonio	L 100–106				HemisFair Arena	21–21
43	January 22, 1985	@ Houston	L 97–101				The Summit	21–22
44	January 23, 1985	@ Atlanta	L 100–101				The Omni	21–23
45	January 26, 1985	@ Washington	L 105–110 (OT)				Capital Centre	21–24
46	January 29, 1985	@ Denver	L 100–128				McNichols Sports Arena	21–25
47	January 30, 1985	New York	W 110–93				Arizona Veterans Memorial Coliseum	22–25

February: 6–7 (home: 4–2; road: 2–5)

Game	Date	Team	Score	High points	High rebounds	High assists	Location Attendance	Record
48	February 3, 1985	Seattle	W 120–109				Arizona Veterans Memorial Coliseum	23–25
49	February 5, 1985	Denver	W 108–103				Arizona Veterans Memorial Coliseum	24–25
50	February 7, 1985	Indiana	W 105–97				Arizona Veterans Memorial Coliseum	25–25
All-Star Break
51	February 12, 1985	@ Houston	L 114–126				The Summit	25–26
52	February 14, 1985	@ San Antonio	L 102–131				HemisFair Arena	25–27
53	February 15, 1985	@ Dallas	W 126–103				Reunion Arena	26–27
54	February 17, 1985	@ Indiana	W 115–97				Market Square Arena	27–27
55	February 18, 1985	@ Detroit	L 103–122				Pontiac Silverdome	27–28
56	February 20, 1985	Houston	L 122–126				Arizona Veterans Memorial Coliseum	27–29
57	February 22, 1985	San Antonio	L 111–118				Arizona Veterans Memorial Coliseum	27–30
58	February 24, 1985	@ Denver	L 107–117				McNichols Sports Arena	27–31
59	February 26, 1985	@ Kansas City	L 103–110				Kemper Arena	27–32
60	February 28, 1985; 7:30 p.m. MST	L.A. Lakers	W 117–105	Nance (23)	Nance (13)	Davis (9)	Arizona Veterans Memorial Coliseum; 14,660	28–32

March: 4–11 (home: 3–5; road: 1–6)

Game	Date	Team	Score	High points	High rebounds	High assists	Location Attendance	Record
61	March 2, 1985	Kansas City	W 114–111				Arizona Veterans Memorial Coliseum	29–32
62	March 4, 1985	Dallas	L 99–107				Arizona Veterans Memorial Coliseum	29–33
63	March 7, 1985	San Antonio	W 119–117				Arizona Veterans Memorial Coliseum	30–33
64	March 9, 1985	Golden State	L 115–118				Arizona Veterans Memorial Coliseum	30–34
65	March 12, 1985	@ New York	W 123–119				Madison Square Garden	31–34
66	March 13, 1985	@ Boston	L 106–123				Boston Garden	31–35
67	March 15, 1985	@ Chicago	L 97–103				Chicago Stadium	31–36
68	March 16, 1985	@ Milwaukee	L 96–125				MECCA Arena	31–37
69	March 19, 1985; 7:30 p.m. MST	L.A. Lakers	L 112–130	Adams (19)	Lucas (12)	Holton, Humphries (7)	Arizona Veterans Memorial Coliseum; 13,473	31–38
70	March 21, 1985	Portland	W 114–104				Arizona Veterans Memorial Coliseum	32–38
71	March 23, 1985	@ Golden State	L 109–123				Oakland-Alameda County Coliseum Arena	32–39
72	March 26, 1985	Detroit	L 93–119				Arizona Veterans Memorial Coliseum	32–40
73	March 28, 1985	@ L.A. Clippers	L 110–116				Los Angeles Memorial Sports Arena	32–41
74	March 30, 1985	L.A. Clippers	L 114–112				Arizona Veterans Memorial Coliseum	32–42
75	March 31, 1985; 8:00 p.m. MST	@ L.A. Lakers	L 98–123	Adams (27)	Lucas (7)	Macy (9)	The Forum; 15,922	32–43

April: 4–3 (home: 3–1; road: 1–2)

Game	Date	Team	Score	High points	High rebounds	High assists	Location Attendance	Record
76	April 2, 1985	Seattle	W 119–109				Arizona Veterans Memorial Coliseum	33–43
77	April 4, 1985	Denver	L 103–110				Arizona Veterans Memorial Coliseum	33–44
78	April 6, 1985	@ Utah	L 94–105				Salt Palace Acord Arena	33–45
79	April 7, 1985	@ Seattle	W 125–110				Kingdome	34–45
80	April 9, 1985	@ Portland	L 100–116				Memorial Coliseum	34–46
81	April 12, 1985	Utah	W 96–92				Arizona Veterans Memorial Coliseum	35–46
82	April 14, 1985	Golden State	W 124–111				Arizona Veterans Memorial Coliseum	36–46

1984–85 schedule

== Playoffs ==
=== Game log ===
1985 playoff game log
First Round: 0–3 (home: 0–1; road: 0–2)

Game	Date	Team	Score	High points	High rebounds	High assists	Location Attendance	Series
1	April 18, 1985; 8:30 p.m. MST	@ L.A. Lakers	L 114–142	Pittman (22)	Lucas (11)	Humphries (8)	The Forum; 15,547	0–1
2	April 20, 1985; 1:30 p.m. MST	@ L.A. Lakers	L 130–147	Adams (23)	Lucas (9)	Lucas (6)	The Forum; 15,261	0–2
3	April 23, 1985; 7:30 p.m. MST	L.A. Lakers	L 103–119	Lucas (26)	Lucas (13)	Adams, Holton (5)	Arizona Veterans Memorial Coliseum; 8,741	0–3

1985 schedule

== Awards and honors ==
=== Week/Month ===
- Larry Nance was named Player of the Week for games played October 26 through November 4.

=== All-Star ===
- Larry Nance was selected as a reserve for the Western Conference in the All-Star Game. Nance finished fifth in voting among Western Conference forwards with 287,665 votes.
- Larry Nance competed in the Slam Dunk Contest. Nance, the 1984 Dunk champion, was eliminated in the semifinals.

=== Season ===
- Kyle Macy led the league in free throw percentage with 90.7%.

== Player statistics ==
Legend
GP	Games played	GS	Games started	MPG	Minutes per game
FG%	Field-goal percentage	3P%	3-point field-goal percentage	FT%	Free-throw percentage
RPG	Rebounds per game	APG	Assists per game	SPG	Steals per game
BPG	Blocks per game	PPG	Points per game

=== Season ===
Phoenix Suns statistics
Player	GP	GS	MPG	FG%	3P%	FT%	RPG	APG	SPG	BPG	PPG
Alvan Adams	82	69	26.0	.520	.	.883	6.1	3.8	1.4	.6	14.7
Walter Davis	23	9	24.8	.450	.300	.877	1.5	4.3	.8	.0	15.0
James Edwards	70	58	25.5	.501	.000	.746	5.5	2.2	.4	.7	14.9
Rod Foster	79	1	16.7	.450	.325†	.755	1.0	2.4	.8	.0	8.8
Mike Holton	74	59	23.8	.446	.311	.814	1.8	2.7	.8	.1	8.4
Jay Humphries	80	39	25.8	.446	.200	.829	2.1	4.4	1.3	.1	8.8
Charles Jones	78	14	20.1	.520	.000	.648	5.1	1.6	.6	.8	8.4
Maurice Lucas	63	22	26.5	.476	.000	.750	8.8	2.3	.6	.3	13.4
Kyle Macy	65	52	31.0	.485	.271	.907	2.8	5.8	1.3	.0	11.0
Larry Nance	61	55	36.1	.587	.500†	.709	8.8	2.6	1.4	1.7	19.9
Charles Pittman	68	3	14.7	.471	.000	.747	3.3	1.0	.3	.3	4.8
Rick Robey	4	0	12.0	.222	.	.500	2.0	1.3	.5	.0	1.3
Mike Sanders	21	11	19.9	.486	.	.763	4.2	1.4	1.1	.2	10.2
Alvin Scott	77	18	16.1	.429	.200	.716	2.1	1.6	.5	.3	3.6
Michael Young	2	0	5.5	.333	.000	.	1.0	0.0	.0	.0	2.0

† – Minimum 25 three-pointers made.

=== Playoffs ===
Phoenix Suns statistics
Player	GP	GS	MPG	FG%	3P%	FT%	RPG	APG	SPG	BPG	PPG
Alvan Adams	3	3	26.3	.500	.	.833	5.7	3.7	2.3	.3	17.0
Rod Foster	3	0	18.7	.280	.000	.750	1.0	2.3	1.7	.0	6.7
Mike Holton	3	0	18.3	.474	.000	1.000	0.7	3.0	.0	.0	7.3
Jay Humphries	3	3	30.0	.645	.	.750	1.7	5.3	.7	.0	16.3
Charles Jones	2	0	17.0	.600	.	1.000	1.5	1.5	.0	1.5	6.0
Maurice Lucas	3	0	28.0	.468	.	.789	11.0	3.3	.7	.7	19.7
Kyle Macy	3	3	28.3	.500	.250	.800	2.7	3.0	2.0	.0	10.3
Charles Pittman	3	3	27.3	.609	.	.706	6.3	3.0	.0	1.0	13.3
Mike Sanders	3	3	30.3	.595	.	.800	5.0	3.3	1.7	.0	17.3
Alvin Scott	3	0	21.3	.250	.000	.833	2.7	3.3	.3	1.3	3.7

== Transactions ==
=== Free agents ===
==== Additions ====
Date	Player	Contract	Old Team
September 24, 1984	Michael Holton	Undisclosed	Puerto Rico Coquis (CBA)
November 27, 1984	Michael Young	Undisclosed	

==== Subtractions ====
Date	Player	Reason left	New team
October 12, 1984	Paul Westphal	Waived	
December 10, 1984	Michael Young	Waived	Detroit Spirits (CBA)
