= Chris Engler =

American basketball player

Personal information
- Born: March 1, 1959 (age 67) Stillwater, Minnesota
- Listed height: 6 ft 11 in (2.11 m)
- Listed weight: 245 lb (111 kg)

Career information
- High school: Stillwater (Oak Park Heights, Minnesota)
- College: Minnesota (1977–1979); Wyoming (1980–1982)
- NBA draft: 1982: 3rd round, 60th overall pick
- Drafted by: Golden State Warriors
- Playing career: 1982–1992
- Position: Center
- Number: 55, 34, 50

Career history
- 1982–1984: Golden State Warriors
- 1984–1985: New Jersey Nets
- 1984–1985: Wyoming Wildcatters
- 1985: Chicago Bulls
- 1985: Milwaukee Bucks
- 1985–1986: Jollycolombani Forlì
- 1986: Portland Trail Blazers
- 1986–1987: Milwaukee Bucks
- 1987–1988: New Jersey Nets
- 1988–1989: Rapid City Thrillers
- 1991–1992: Alvik BK
- Stats at NBA.com
- Stats at Basketball Reference

Chris Engler (born March 1, 1959) is an American former National Basketball Association (NBA) player. Engler was drafted from the University of Wyoming by the Golden State Warriors in the third round of the 1982 NBA draft. Engler began his collegiate career with the Minnesota Golden Gophers before transferring to Wyoming. Engler played two seasons with the Warriors, then subsequently had short stints with the Milwaukee Bucks, Chicago Bulls, New Jersey Nets, and Portland Trail Blazers before staying with the Nets for the final two seasons of his NBA career. Engler finished with career averages of 1.8 points per game and 2.0 rebounds per game.

Engler's post-NBA careers have included working as a Social Studies teacher at Stillwater Area High School and as a part-time lawyer.

== Career statistics ==
Legend
GP	Games played	GS	Games started	MPG	Minutes per game
FG%	Field goal percentage	3P%	3-point field goal percentage	FT%	Free throw percentage
RPG	Rebounds per game	APG	Assists per game	SPG	Steals per game
BPG	Blocks per game	PPG	Points per game	**Bold**	Career high

=== NBA ===
==== Regular season ====
Year	Team	GP	GS	MPG	FG%	3P%	FT%	RPG	APG	SPG	BPG	PPG
1982–83	Golden State	**54**	**1**	6.8	.404	–	.313	1.9	.2	.1	.3	1.5
1983–84	Golden State	46	**1**	7.8	.398	–	.609	2.1	.2	.2	.1	1.7
1984–85	New Jersey	7	0	**10.9**	.438	–	.556	**3.9**	.0	**.3**	.6	**2.7**
1984–85	Chicago	3	0	1.0	.500	–	–	.7	.0	.0	.0	.7
1984–85	Milwaukee	1	0	3.0	.000	–	–	1.0	.0	.0	**1.0**	.0
1986–87	Portland	7	0	2.4	.500	–	**1.000**	1.1	.1	.1	.1	1.6
1986–87	Milwaukee	5	0	9.6	.250	–	**1.000**	3.2	**.6**	.2	.2	1.4
1986–87	New Jersey	18	0	7.2	**.516**	–	.667	1.8	.2	.2	.5	2.2
1987–88	New Jersey	**54**	0	7.4	.409	–	.886	1.8	.3	.2	.1	1.9
Career		195	2	7.2	.411	–	.677	2.0	.2	.2	.2	1.8

==== Playoffs ====
Year	Team	GP	GS	MPG	FG%	3P%	FT%	RPG	APG	SPG	BPG	PPG
1985	Milwaukee	1	0	6.0	1.000	–	–	2.0	.0	.0	.0	2.0
