= 1984–85 Detroit Pistons season =

NBA team season

- Head coach: Chuck Daly
- General manager: Jack McCloskey
- Owner: Bill Davidson
- Arena: Pontiac Silverdome; Joe Louis Arena

Results
- Record: 46–36 (.561)
- Place: Division: 2nd (Central); Conference: 4th (Eastern)
- Playoff finish: Conference semifinals (lost to Celtics 2–4)
- Stats at Basketball Reference

Local media
- Television: WKBD-TV (George Blaha, Dave Bing); PASS Sports (Fred McLeod, Tom Wilson)
- Radio: WJR (George Blaha, Dave Bing)

The 1984–85 Detroit Pistons season was the Detroit Pistons' 37th season in the NBA and 28th season in the city of Detroit. Due to repairs to their home at the time, Pontiac Silverdome, the Pistons spent the latter part of the season – and all five of their post-season games – at the Detroit Red Wings' arena, Joe Louis Arena, in Detroit proper.

Detroit continued their winning ways, finishing the season 46–36 (.561), 2nd place in the Central Division. The team advanced to the playoffs, defeating the New Jersey Nets 3–0, for the franchise's first playoff series win since 1976, but fell 4–2 to Larry Bird and the Boston Celtics in the conference semi-finals. 1985 was also perhaps the start of bad blood between the Chicago Bulls and star Michael Jordan and the Pistons. At the 1985 NBA All-Star Game, reports were that Pistons star Isiah Thomas and friend Los Angeles Lakers star Magic Johnson conspired to "freeze-out" rookie Jordan on the national stage. As the Pistons and Bulls battled over the next few years, Jordan may have exacted his revenge in ensuring Thomas was not named to the 1992 Olympic Dream Team.

The Pistons were led in 1984–85 by Thomas (21.2 ppg, 13.9 apg, NBA All-Star) and center Bill Laimbeer (17.5 ppg, 12.4 rpg, NBA All-Star).

== Draft picks ==
Round	Pick	Player	Position	Nationality	College
1	20	Tony Campbell	SF/SG	United States	Ohio State

== Roster ==
1984–85 Detroit Pistons roster
Players

Pos.	No.	Player	Height	Weight	DOB	From
C	54	Kent Benson	6 ft 10 in (2.08 m)	235 lb (107 kg)		Indiana
G/F	00	Tony Campbell	6 ft 7 in (2.01 m)	215 lb (98 kg)		Ohio State
F	23	Earl Cureton	6 ft 9 in (2.06 m)	245 lb (111 kg)		Detroit Mercy
SG	15	Vinnie Johnson	6 ft 2 in (1.88 m)	200 lb (91 kg)		Baylor
PF	35	Major Jones	6 ft 9 in (2.06 m)	225 lb (102 kg)		Albany State
C	40	Bill Laimbeer	6 ft 11 in (2.11 m)	245 lb (111 kg)		Notre Dame
SG	25	John Long	6 ft 5 in (1.96 m)	195 lb (88 kg)		Detroit Mercy
PG	14	Lorenzo Romar	6 ft 1 in (1.85 m)	175 lb (79 kg)		Washington
PF	32	Dan Roundfield	6 ft 8 in (2.03 m)	205 lb (93 kg)		Central Michigan
SG	31	Brook Steppe	6 ft 5 in (1.96 m)	195 lb (88 kg)		Georgia Tech
SG	22	Terry Teagle	6 ft 5 in (1.96 m)	195 lb (88 kg)		Baylor
SF	22	David Thirdkill	6 ft 7 in (2.01 m)	195 lb (88 kg)		Bradley
PG	11	Isiah Thomas	6 ft 1 in (1.85 m)	180 lb (82 kg)		Indiana
F	7	Kelly Tripucka	6 ft 6 in (1.98 m)	220 lb (100 kg)		Notre Dame
G/F	41	Terry Tyler	6 ft 7 in (2.01 m)	215 lb (98 kg)		Detroit Mercy
PF	31	Dale Wilkinson	6 ft 10 in (2.08 m)	220 lb (100 kg)		Idaho State

Coaches
Head coach
- Chuck Daly
Assistant(s)
- Dick Harter

Legend
- (DP) Unsigned draft pick
- (FA) Free agent
- (S) Suspended
- Injured

== Regular season ==
=== Season standings ===
Central Division	W	L	PCT	GB	Home	Road	Div
y-Milwaukee Bucks	59	23	.720	–	36–5	23–18	20–10
x-Detroit Pistons	46	36	.561	13	26–15	20–21	21–8
x-Chicago Bulls	38	44	.463	21	26–15	12–29	13–17
x-Cleveland Cavaliers	36	46	.439	23	20–21	16–25	13–16
Atlanta Hawks	34	48	.415	25	19–22	15–26	15–15
Indiana Pacers	22	60	.268	37	16–25	6–35	7–23

#	Eastern Conference				
#	Team	W	L	PCT	GB
1	z-Boston Celtics	63	19	.768	–
2	y-Milwaukee Bucks	59	23	.720	4
3	x-Philadelphia 76ers	58	24	.707	5
4	x-Detroit Pistons	46	36	.561	17
5	x-New Jersey Nets	42	40	.512	21
6	x-Washington Bullets	40	42	.488	23
7	x-Chicago Bulls	38	44	.463	25
8	x-Cleveland Cavaliers	36	46	.439	27
9	Atlanta Hawks	34	48	.415	29
10	New York Knicks	24	58	.293	39
11	Indiana Pacers	22	60	.268	41

z – clinched division title
y – clinched division title
x – clinched playoff spot

== Game log ==
=== Regular season ===
1984–85 game log
Total: 46–36 (home: 26–15; road: 20–21)
October: 1–2 (home: 1–1; road: 0–1)

Game	Date	Team	Score	High points	High rebounds	High assists	Location Attendance	Record
1	October 26, 1984	Boston	L 123–130	Isiah Thomas (35)	Bill Laimbeer (13)	Isiah Thomas (11)	Pontiac Silverdome	0–1
2	October 27, 1984	@ New York	L 118–137	Bill Laimbeer (28)	Bill Laimbeer (16)	Isiah Thomas (16)	Madison Square Garden	0–2
3	October 30, 1984	Cleveland	W 124–107				Pontiac Silverdome	1–2

November : 7–7 (home: 2–4; road: 5–3)

Game	Date	Team	Score	High points	High rebounds	High assists	Location Attendance	Record
4	November 1, 1984	@ Atlanta	W 118–114				The Omni	2–2
5	November 2, 1984	@ Boston	L 116–127				Boston Garden	2–3
6	November 5, 1984	@ Cleveland	W 107–98				Richfield Coliseum	3–3
7	November 7, 1984	Chicago	L 118–122				Pontiac Silverdome	3–4
8	November 10, 1984	Milwaukee	W 104–100				Pontiac Silverdome	4–4
9	November 14, 1984	@ Philadelphia	W 137–133 (OT)				The Spectrum	5–4
10	November 16, 1984	Philadelphia	L 90–101				Pontiac Silverdome	5–5
11	November 17, 1984	@ Dallas	W 124–110				Reunion Arena	6–5
12	November 20, 1984	@ Houston	L 117–123				The Summit	6–6
13	November 21, 1984	@ San Antonio	W 114–101				HemisFair Arena	7–6
14	November 23, 1984	New York	L 97–120				Pontiac Silverdome	7–7
15	November 24, 1984	@ Washington	L 106–112				Capital Centre	7–8
16	November 28, 1984	Portland	W 120–113				Pontiac Silverdome	8–8
17	November 30, 1984	Washington	L 106–114				Pontiac Silverdome	8–9

December : 8–6 (home: 4–2; road: 4–4)

Game	Date	Team	Score	High points	High rebounds	High assists	Location Attendance	Record
18	December 1, 1984	@ Indiana	W 131–109				Market Square Arena	9–9
19	December 4, 1984	Boston	W 104–99				Pontiac Silverdome	10–9
20	December 6, 1984	@ Milwaukee	L 99–114				MECCA Arena	10–10
21	December 7, 1984	Denver	W 122–115				Pontiac Silverdome	11–10
22	December 11, 1984	@ Chicago	W 108–101				Chicago Stadium	12–10
23	December 12, 1984	Chicago	W 102–95				Pontiac Silverdome	13–10
24	December 14, 1984	Indiana	W 120–96				Pontiac Silverdome	14–10
25	December 19, 1984	@ Denver	W 148–129				McNichols Sports Arena	15–10
26	December 20, 1984	@ Utah	L 116–117				Salt Palace Acord Arena	15–11
27	December 22, 1984	@ Kansas City	L 123–129				Kemper Arena	15–12
28	December 25, 1984	Philadelphia	L 108–109				Pontiac Silverdome	15–13
29	December 26, 1984	@ New Jersey	L 97–112				Brendan Byrne Arena	15–14
30	December 28, 1984	@ Indiana	W 116–110				Market Square Arena	16–14
31	December 29, 1984	New Jersey	L 108–110				Pontiac Silverdome	16–15

January : 12–2 (home: 8–0; road: 4–2)

Game	Date	Team	Score	High points	High rebounds	High assists	Location Attendance	Record
32	January 2, 1985	Cleveland	W 108–100				Pontiac Silverdome	17–15
33	January 4, 1985	Atlanta	W 134–111				Pontiac Silverdome	18–15
34	January 5, 1985	@ Washington	W 121–113				Capital Centre	19–15
35	January 9, 1985	@ Philadelphia	L 122–126				The Spectrum	19–16
36	January 11, 1985	Indiana	W 120–109				Pontiac Silverdome	20–16
37	January 13, 1985; 12 Noon EST	L.A. Lakers	W 121–98	Thomas (30)	Roundfield (14)	Thomas (20)	Pontiac Silverdome; 23,475	21–16
38	January 17, 1985	@ New York	W 105–89				Madison Square Garden	22–16
39	January 19, 1985	@ New Jersey	W 109–107				Brendan Byrne Arena	23–16
40	January 22, 1985	@ Atlanta (at New Orleans, LA)	W 130–113				Lakefront Arena	24–16
41	January 24, 1985	Golden State	W 137–118				Pontiac Silverdome	25–16
42	January 26, 1985	Seattle	W 132–113				Pontiac Silverdome	27–16
43	January 27, 1985	Washington	W 115–105				Pontiac Silverdome	27–16
44	January 29, 1985	@ Boston (at Hartford, CT)	L 130–131				Hartford Civic Center	27–17
45	January 30, 1985	Kansas City	W 120–116				Pontiac Silverdome	28–17

February : 5–8 (home: 4–4; road: 1–4)

Game	Date	Team	Score	High points	High rebounds	High assists	Location Attendance	Record
46	February 2, 1985	Atlanta	W 110–102 (OT)				Pontiac Silverdome	29–17
47	February 4, 1985	@ Milwaukee	W 113–111 (OT)				MECCA Arena	30–17
48	February 5, 1985	New Jersey	L 117–119				Pontiac Silverdome	30–18
49	February 7, 1985	@ Washington	L 126–128 (2OT)				Capital Centre	30–19
All-Star Break
50	February 12, 1985	@ Chicago	L 126–139 (OT)				Chicago Stadium	30–20
51	February 13, 1985	Dallas	W 124–119				Pontiac Silverdome	31–20
52	February 15, 1985	@ New Jersey	L 123–124				Brendan Byrne Arena	31–21
53	February 16, 1985	Philadelphia	L 114–125				Pontiac Silverdome	31–22
54	February 18, 1985	Phoenix	W 122–103				Pontiac Silverdome	32–22
55	February 20, 1985	Milwaukee	L 112–113				Pontiac Silverdome	32–23
56	February 22, 1985	@ Philadelphia	L 99–110				The Spectrum	32–24
57	February 23, 1985	New Jersey	L 103–111				Pontiac Silverdome	32–25
58	February 27, 1985	Chicago	W 108–99				Pontiac Silverdome	33–25

March : 7–8 (home: 4–2; road: 3–6)

Game	Date	Team	Score	High points	High rebounds	High assists	Location Attendance	Record
59	March 1, 1985	San Antonio	L 98–108				Pontiac Silverdome	33–26
60	March 3, 1985	@ Boston	L 129–138				Boston Garden	33–27
61	March 6, 1985	New York	W 114–90				Joe Louis Arena	34–27
62	March 7, 1985	Utah	L 114–122				Joe Louis Arena	34–28
63	March 9, 1985	@ Atlanta	W 115–113				The Omni	35–28
64	March 11, 1985	L.A. Clippers	W 121–114				Cobo Arena	36–28
65	March 12, 1985	@ Chicago	L 110–111				Chicago Stadium	36–29
66	March 17, 1985	@ Seattle	L 98–106				Kingdome	36–30
67	March 18, 1985	@ L.A. Clippers	L 116–136				Los Angeles Memorial Sports Arena	36–31
68	March 19, 1985	@ Portland	L 123–143				Memorial Coliseum	36–32
69	March 21, 1985	@ Golden State	W 122–113				Oakland-Alameda County Coliseum Arena	38–33
70	March 24, 1985; 10:30 p.m. EST	@ L.A. Lakers	L 130–148	Thomas (30)	Laimbeer (14)	Thomas (15)	The Forum; 17,505	37–33
71	March 26, 1985	@ Phoenix	W 119–93				Arizona Veterans Memorial Coliseum	38–33
72	March 27, 1985	Houston	W 127–110				Joe Louis Arena	39–33
73	March 31, 1985	Boston	W 113–105				Joe Louis Arena	40–33

April : 6–3 (home: 3–2; road: 3–1)

Game	Date	Team	Score	High points	High rebounds	High assists	Location Attendance	Record
74	April 1, 1985	Atlanta	L 100–114				Joe Louis Arena	40–34
75	April 2, 1985	@ Indiana	W 124–121				Market Square Arena	41–34
76	April 4, 1985	@ Milwaukee	L 121–130				MECCA Arena	41–35
77	April 5, 1985	Cleveland	L 118–119				Joe Louis Arena	41–36
78	April 7, 1985	Milwaukee	W 113–91				Joe Louis Arena	42–36
79	April 9, 1985	@ New York	W 107–97				Madison Square Garden	43–36
80	April 10, 1985	Indiana	W 116–114				Joe Louis Arena	44–36
81	April 12, 1985	Washington	W 102–96				Joe Louis Arena	45–36
82	April 14, 1985	@ Cleveland	W 116–113				Richfield Coliseum	46–36

1984–85 schedule

== Playoffs ==
1985 playoff game log
First Round: 3–0 (home: 2–0; road: 1–0)

Game	Date	Team	Score	High points	High rebounds	High assists	Location Attendance	Series
1	April 18, 1985	New Jersey	W 125–105	Bill Laimbeer (23)	Bill Laimbeer (13)	Isiah Thomas (11)	Joe Louis Arena; 10,465	1–0
2	April 21, 1985	New Jersey	W 121–111	Isiah Thomas (29)	Bill Laimbeer (12)	Isiah Thomas (14)	Joe Louis Arena; 11,501	2–0
3	April 24, 1985	@ New Jersey	W 116–115	Terry Tyler (23)	Tripucka, Tyler (11)	Isiah Thomas (11)	Brendan Byrne Arena; 9,999	3–0

Conference semifinals: 2–4 (home: 2–1; road: 0–3)

Game	Date	Team	Score	High points	High rebounds	High assists	Location Attendance	Series
1	April 28, 1985	@ Boston	L 99–133	Isiah Thomas (23)	three players tied (5)	Isiah Thomas (8)	Boston Garden; 14,890	0–1
2	April 30, 1985	@ Boston	L 114–121	Isiah Thomas (28)	Thomas, Laimbeer (9)	Isiah Thomas (15)	Boston Garden; 14,890	0–2
3	May 2, 1985	Boston	W 125–117	Bill Laimbeer (27)	Bill Laimbeer (13)	Isiah Thomas (16)	Joe Louis Arena; 14,209	1–2
4	May 5, 1985	Boston	W 102–99	Vinnie Johnson (34)	Bill Laimbeer (12)	Isiah Thomas (10)	Joe Louis Arena; 14,350	2–2
5	May 8, 1985	@ Boston	L 123–130	Vinnie Johnson (30)	Bill Laimbeer (13)	Isiah Thomas (7)	Boston Garden; 14,890	2–3
6	May 10, 1985	Boston	L 113–123	Isiah Thomas (37)	Bill Laimbeer (13)	Isiah Thomas (9)	Joe Louis Arena; 21,193	2–4

1985 schedule

== Awards and records ==
- Isiah Thomas, All-NBA First Team

== See also ==
- 1984–85 NBA season
