= Kenton Edelin =

American basketball player (1962–2022)

Personal information
- Born: May 24, 1962 Heidelberg, Baden-Württemberg, West Germany
- Died: December 24, 2022 (aged 60) Fairfax, Virginia, U.S.
- Listed height: 6 ft 8 in (2.03 m)
- Listed weight: 205 lb (93 kg)

Career information
- High school: Hayfield (Alexandria, Virginia)
- College: Virginia (1981–1984)
- NBA draft: 1984: 7th round, 140th overall pick
- Drafted by: Indiana Pacers
- Position: Small forward
- Number: 25

Career history
- 1985: Indiana Pacers
- Stats at NBA.com
- Stats at Basketball Reference

Kenton Scott Edelin (May 24, 1962 – December 24, 2022) was an American basketball player and attorney. He played one season in the National Basketball Association (NBA).

Edelin attended the University of Virginia, where he was not offered a basketball scholarship, instead playing his freshman year for the Cavaliers' junior varsity team. After growing two inches in his sophomore season, Edelin made the varsity team where as a senior he helped the team reach the 1984 Final Four. For his college career, Edelin averaged 3.3 points and 4.6 rebounds per game.

After graduating from Virginia, Edelin was drafted in the seventh round (140th pick overall) of the 1984 NBA draft by the Indiana Pacers. He played 10 games for the Pacers in the 1984–85 NBA season, averaging 1.1 points, 2.6 rebounds, and 1 assist per game for his NBA career. At the conclusion of his rookie season, he retired from basketball and returned to the University of Virginia to attend law school. He worked as an attorney and player agent until suffering a series of ischemic strokes in March 2022. Edelin died of stroke complications in Northern Virginia, on December 24, 2022, at the age of 60.

== Career statistics ==
Legend
GP	Games played	GS	Games started	MPG	Minutes per game
FG%	Field goal percentage	3P%	3-point field goal percentage	FT%	Free throw percentage
RPG	Rebounds per game	APG	Assists per game	SPG	Steals per game
BPG	Blocks per game	PPG	Points per game	**Bold**	Career high

=== NBA ===
==== Regular season ====
Year	Team	GP	GS	MPG	FG%	3P%	FT%	RPG	APG	SPG	BPG	PPG
1984–85	Indiana	10	1	14.3	.308	–	.375	2.6	1.0	.5	.4	1.1
