= 1984–85 Washington Bullets season =

NBA professional basketball team season

- Head coach: Gene Shue
- General manager: Bob Ferry
- Owner: Abe Pollin
- Arena: Capital Centre

Results
- Record: 40–42 (.488)
- Place: Division: 4th (Atlantic); Conference: 6th (Eastern)
- Playoff finish: First round (lost to 76ers 1–3)
- Stats at Basketball Reference

Local media
- Television: WDCA; Home Team Sports
- Radio: WTOP

The 1984–85 Washington Bullets season was the Bullets 24th season in the NBA and their 12th season in the city of Washington, D.C.

== Draft picks ==
Round	Pick	Player	Position	Nationality	College
1	6	Melvin Turpin	C	United States	Kentucky
2	34	Tony Costner		United States	St. Joseph's
2	44	Fred Reynolds		United States	Texas El-Paso
3	53	Ricky Ross		United States	Tulsa
4	76	Jim Grandholm	PF	United States	South Florida
5	99	Cohn Irish		United States	Bowling Green State
6	122	Blaise Bugajeski		United States	Illinois Wesleyan
7	145	Tim Garrett		United States	New Mexico
8	168	Darryl Odom		United States	West Virginia Wesleyan
9	190	Mike Emanuel		United States	North Carolina-Pembroke
10	212	Glynn Myrick		United States	Stetson

== Roster ==
Washington Bullets roster
Players

Pos.	No.	Player	Height	Weight	DOB	From
F	42	Greg Ballard	6 ft 7 in (2.01 m)	215 lb (98 kg)		Oregon
SG	22	Dudley Bradley	6 ft 6 in (1.98 m)	195 lb (88 kg)		North Carolina
PG	15	Frank Johnson	6 ft 1 in (1.85 m)	185 lb (84 kg)		Wake Forest
PF	44	Rick Mahorn	6 ft 10 in (2.08 m)	240 lb (109 kg)		Hampton
G	24	Jeff Malone	6 ft 4 in (1.93 m)	205 lb (93 kg)		Mississippi State
C	54	Tom McMillen	6 ft 11 in (2.11 m)	215 lb (98 kg)		Maryland
F	4	Cliff Robinson	6 ft 9 in (2.06 m)	220 lb (100 kg)		USC
C	43	Jeff Ruland	6 ft 10 in (2.08 m)	240 lb (109 kg)		Iona
G	1	Gus Williams	6 ft 2 in (1.88 m)	175 lb (79 kg)		USC

Coaches
Head coach
- Gene Shue

Legend
- (DP) Unsigned draft pick
- (FA) Free agent
- (S) Suspended
- Injured

== Regular season ==
=== Season standings ===
Atlantic Division	W	L	PCT	GB	Home	Road	Div
y-Boston Celtics	63	19	.768	–	35–6	28–13	19–5
x-Philadelphia 76ers	58	24	.707	5	34–7	24–17	15–9
x-New Jersey Nets	42	40	.512	21	27–14	15–26	13–11
x-Washington Bullets	40	42	.488	23	28–13	12–29	11–13
New York Knicks	24	58	.293	39	19–22	5–36	2–22

#	Eastern Conference				
#	Team	W	L	PCT	GB
1	z-Boston Celtics	63	19	.768	–
2	y-Milwaukee Bucks	59	23	.720	4
3	x-Philadelphia 76ers	58	24	.707	5
4	x-Detroit Pistons	46	36	.561	17
5	x-New Jersey Nets	42	40	.512	21
6	x-Washington Bullets	40	42	.488	23
7	x-Chicago Bulls	38	44	.463	25
8	x-Cleveland Cavaliers	36	46	.439	27
9	Atlanta Hawks	34	48	.415	29
10	New York Knicks	24	58	.293	39
11	Indiana Pacers	22	60	.268	41

Notes

- z, y – division champions
- x – clinched playoff spot

== Game log ==
=== Regular season ===
1984–85 game log
Total: 40–42 (home: 28–13; road: 12–29)
October: 2–2 (home: 1–1; road: 1–1)

Game	Date	Team	Score	High points	High rebounds	High assists	Location Attendance	Record
1	October 26	@ Chicago	L 93–109				Chicago Stadium	0–1
2	October 27	@ Indiana	W 104–102				Market Square Arena	1–1
3	October 30	Atlanta	W 119–104				Capital Centre	2–1
4	October 31	@ Milwaukee	L 79–105				MECCA Arena	2–2

November: 9–5 (home: 6–2; road: 3–3)

Game	Date	Team	Score	High points	High rebounds	High assists	Location Attendance	Record
5	November 2	Milwaukee	L 96–102				Capital Centre	2–3
6	November 3	@ Atlanta	L 107–127				The Omni	2–4
7	November 7	@ New Jersey	L 88–99				Brendan Byrne Arena	2–5
8	November 8	L.A. Clippers	W 93–88				Capital Centre	3–5
9	November 10	Boston	W 112–95				Capital Centre	4–5
10	November 13	@ New York	W 103–92				Madison Square Garden	5–5
11	November 14	San Antonio	W 125–106				Capital Centre	6–5
12	November 16	New York	W 118–104				Capital Centre	7–5
13	November 20	@ Philadelphia	W 120–105				Spectrum	8–5
14	November 21	Kansas City	W 97–92				Capital Centre	9–5
15	November 23	@ Boston	L 110–118				Boston Garden	9–6
16	November 24	Detroit	W 112–106				Capital Centre	10–6
17	November 27	Philadelphia	L 89–93				Capital Centre	10–7
18	November 30	@ Detroit	W 114–106				Pontiac Silverdome	11–7

December: 8–6 (home: 7–1; road: 1–5)

Game	Date	Team	Score	High points	High rebounds	High assists	Location Attendance	Record
19	December 1	Milwaukee	W 100–97				Capital Centre	12–7
20	December 6	Indiana	W 111–106				Capital Centre	13–7
21	December 8; 7:30 p.m. EST	L.A. Lakers	W 101–98	Robinson (25)	Ruland (12)	Ruland (9)	Capital Centre; 19,105	14–7
22	December 11	Utah	L 82–85				Capital Centre	14–8
23	December 13	@ Phoenix	L 86–116				Arizona Veterans Memorial Coliseum	14–9
24	December 15	@ L.A. Clippers	L 103–109				Los Angeles Memorial Sports Arena	14–10
25	December 16; 10:30 p.m. EST	@ L.A. Lakers	L 101–109	Ruland (24)	Ruland (10)	Williams (6)	The Forum; 15,070	14–11
26	December 18	New Jersey	W 104–95				Capital Centre	15–11
27	December 19	@ New Jersey	L 106–115				Brendan Byrne Arena	15–12
28	December 21	New York	W 125–111				Capital Centre	16–12
29	December 22	@ Atlanta	L 101–119				The Omni	16–13
30	December 26	Indiana	W 114–89				Capital Centre	17–13
31	December 28	Atlanta	W 125–111				Capital Centre	18–13
32	December 29	@ New York	W 116–108				Madison Square Garden	19–13

January: 8–6 (home: 5–1; road: 3–5)

Game	Date	Team	Score	High points	High rebounds	High assists	Location Attendance	Record
33	January 3	@ Cleveland	L 93–100				Richfield Coliseum	19–14
34	January 5	Detroit	L 113–121				Capital Centre	19–15
35	January 8	@ Milwaukee	W 99–95				MECCA Arena	20–15
36	January 11	@ Boston	L 101–103				Boston Garden	20–16
37	January 13	Philadelphia	L 104–115				Capital Centre	20–17
38	January 14	@ Cleveland	W 101–91				Richfield Coliseum	21–17
39	January 16	@ Utah	W 103–101				Salt Palace Acord Arena	22–17
40	January 18	@ Denver	L 106–108				McNichols Sports Arena	22–18
41	January 19	@ Kansas City	L 98–103				Kemper Arena	22–19
42	January 21	Cleveland	W 128–115				Capital Centre	23–19
43	January 22	Golden State	W 109–104				Capital Centre	24–19
44	January 24	Dallas	W 93–92				Capital Centre	25–19
45	January 26	Phoenix	W 110–105 (OT)				Capital Centre	26–19
46	January 27	@ Detroit	L 105–115				Pontiac Silverdome	26–20
47	January 30	Chicago	W 106–95				Capital Centre	27–20

February: 3–9 (home: 1–3; road: 2–6)

Game	Date	Team	Score	High points	High rebounds	High assists	Location Attendance	Record
48	February 1	@ Indiana	L 95–102				Market Square Arena	27–21
49	February 2	Boston	L 91–97				Capital Centre	27–22
50	February 4	Cleveland	L 112–121				Capital Centre	27–23
51	February 6	@ Philadelphia	L 111–116				Spectrum	27–24
52	February 7	Detroit	W 128–126 (2OT)				Capital Centre	28–24
All-Star Break
53	February 12	@ Seattle	L 94–109				Kingdome	28–25
54	February 15	@ Portland	L 89–93				Memorial Coliseum	28–26
55	February 17	@ Golden State	L 121–125 (OT)				Oakland-Alameda County Coliseum Arena	28–27
56	February 20	@ San Antonio	W 105–104				HemisFair Arena	29–27
57	February 22	@ Dallas	L 101–110				Capital Centre	29–28
58	February 23	@ Houston	W 123–115				The Summit	30–28
59	February 27	Denver	L 111–124				Capital Centre	30–29

March: 7–8 (home: 5–4; road: 2–4)

Game	Date	Team	Score	High points	High rebounds	High assists	Location Attendance	Record
60	March 1	New Jersey	L 98–100				Capital Centre	30–30
61	March 2	@ New York	W 109–97				Madison Square Garden	31–30
62	March 5	@ Chicago	L 99–104				Chicago Stadium	31–31
63	March 6	Portland	W 127–121 (2OT)				Capital Centre	32–31
64	March 9	Seattle	L 92–93				Capital Centre	32–32
65	March 11	Chicago	W 119–112				Capital Centre	33–32
66	March 13	@ New Jersey	L 109–114				Brendan Byrne Arena	33–33
67	March 15	Houston	W 120–114				Capital Centre	34–33
68	March 19	@ Atlanta (at New Orleans, LA)	L 97–103				Lakefront Arena	34–34
69	March 20	New York	W 105–102				Capital Centre	35–34
70	March 23	Boston	L 98–104				Capital Centre	35–35
71	March 26	Milwaukee	L 96–107				Capital Centre	35–36
72	March 27	@ Philadelphia	L 97–115				Spectrum	35–37
73	March 29	New Jersey	W 122–98				Capital Centre	36–37
74	March 31	@ Indiana	W 111–105				Market Square Arena	37–37

April: 3–5 (home: 3–1; road: 0–4)

Game	Date	Team	Score	High points	High rebounds	High assists	Location Attendance	Record
75	April 2	@ Cleveland	L 107–122				Richfield Coliseum	37–38
76	April 3	Chicago	L 91–100				Capital Centre	37–39
77	April 5	@ Boston	L 104–115				Boston Garden	37–40
78	April 6	Cleveland	W 109–101				Capital Centre	38–40
79	April 9	Atlanta	W 130–110				Capital Centre	39–40
80	April 10	@ Milwaukee	L 97–106				MECCA Arena	39–41
81	April 12	@ Detroit	L 105–115				Joe Louis Arena	39–42
82	April 13	Philadelphia	W 118–106				Capital Centre	40–42

1984–85 schedule

=== Playoffs ===
1985 playoff game log
Eastern Conference First Round: 1–3 (home: 1–1; road: 0–2)

Game	Date	Team	Score	High points	High rebounds	High assists	Location Attendance	Series
1	April 17	@ Philadelphia	L 97–104	Robinson (24)	Ruland (10)	Williams (8)	Spectrum; 7,170	0–1
2	April 21	@ Philadelphia	L 94–113	Malone (30)	Robinson (11)	Daye (9)	Spectrum; 9,612	0–2
3	April 24	Philadelphia	W 118–100	Williams (28)	Ballard, Robinson, Ruland (7)	Johnson, Ruland (5)	Capital Centre; 11,103	1–2
4	April 26	Philadelphia	L 98–106	Malone (24)	Ruland (10)	Ruland (7)	Capital Centre; 12,238	1–3

1985 schedule

== See also ==
- 1984–85 NBA season
