= Darren Daye =

American basketball player (born 1960)

Personal information
- Born: November 30, 1960 (age 65) Des Moines, Iowa, U.S.
- Listed height: 6 ft 8 in (2.03 m)
- Listed weight: 220 lb (100 kg)

Career information
- High school: John F. Kennedy (Los Angeles, California)
- College: UCLA (1979–1983)
- NBA draft: 1983: 3rd round, 57th overall pick
- Drafted by: Washington Bullets
- Playing career: 1983–1997
- Position: Small forward / shooting guard
- Number: 25, 30, 20

Career history
- 1983–1986: Washington Bullets
- 1986: Chicago Bulls
- 1986–1988: Boston Celtics
- 1988–1992: Scavolini Pesaro
- 1992–1994: Mens Sana Siena
- 1994–1995: Hapoel Galil Elyon
- 1995–1996: Pau-Orthez
- 1996–1997: Maccabi Rishon LeZion

Career highlights
- Second-team Parade All-American (1979); McDonald's All-American MVP (1979); California Mr. Basketball (1979)
- Stats at NBA.com
- Stats at Basketball Reference
Medals
Men's basketball
Representing United States
FIBA U19 World Cup
Gold medal – first place	1979 Salvador	National team

Darren Keefe Daye (born November 30, 1960) is an American former professional basketball player. Born in Des Moines, Iowa, at a height of 6 ft 8 in (2.03 m), and a weight of 220 lb (100 kg), he played as a shooting guard and small forward.

== High school ==
Daye played high-school basketball with John F. Kennedy High School, in the Granada Hills district of Los Angeles. Daye was the Most Valuable Player of the 1979 McDonald's All-American Game. Playing for the West team, Daye recorded a double-double, with 22 points and 14 rebounds. It was not enough though, as the West lost the game by one point.

== College career ==
Daye attended and played college basketball for the UCLA Bruins from 1979 to 1983.

== Professional career ==
Daye was selected by the Washington Bullets, in the third round (57th pick overall) of the 1983 NBA draft. Daye played in five National Basketball Association (NBA) seasons, from 1983 to 1988, with the Bullets, Chicago Bulls, and Boston Celtics. Daye's season with the Celtics in 1987–88, was his final season in the NBA. One of his most notable games was Game 4 of the 1987 Eastern Conference Semifinals against the Milwaukee Bucks when he scored a huge field goal as well as the deciding free throws, all in the second overtime, helping the Celtics win the game.

He later played overseas in Italy, France, and Israel, before he retired from playing professional basketball in 1997.

== Personal ==
Daye's son, Austin Daye, played with Gonzaga University's men's basketball team, and he was drafted 15th overall by the Detroit Pistons in the 2009 NBA draft. Austin also won an NBA championship with the San Antonio Spurs, after they defeated the Miami Heat, in the 2014 NBA Finals.

== Career statistics ==
Legend
GP	Games played	GS	Games started	MPG	Minutes per game
FG%	Field goal percentage	3P%	3-point field goal percentage	FT%	Free throw percentage
RPG	Rebounds per game	APG	Assists per game	SPG	Steals per game
BPG	Blocks per game	PPG	Points per game	**Bold**	Career high

=== NBA ===
==== Regular season ====
Year	Team	GP	GS	MPG	FG%	3P%	FT%	RPG	APG	SPG	BPG	PPG
1983–84	Washington	75	0	15.7	.441	.000	.714	2.5	2.3	.5	**.2**	6.1
1984–85	Washington	**80**	**8**	**19.7**	.512	.143	**.715**	**3.4**	**3.0**	**.7**	**.2**	**8.7**
1985–86	Washington	64	4	16.8	.496	**.333**	.671	2.9	1.7	**.7**	**.2**	**8.7**
1986–87	Chicago	1	0	7.0	–	–	–	1.0	1.0	.0	.0	.0
1986–87	Boston	61	2	11.9	.500	–	.523	2.0	1.2	.4	.1	3.9
1987–88	Boston	47	**8**	13.9	**.516**	.000	.678	1.6	1.5	.6	.1	6.0
Career		328	22	15.9	.491	.118	.681	2.6	2.0	.6	.2	6.8

==== Playoffs ====
Year	Team	GP	GS	MPG	FG%	3P%	FT%	RPG	APG	SPG	BPG	PPG
1984	Washington	3	0	5.0	.200	–	**1.000**	.0	.3	.0	**.3**	1.3
1985	Washington	4	**4**	**21.3**	.567	–	.438	**3.0**	**3.5**	**.8**	.0	**10.3**
1986	Washington	4	0	8.0	.333	–	.000	2.0	.0	.0	.0	2.0
1987	Boston	**23**	1	10.4	**.583**	–	.865	1.4	.6	.4	.1	5.0
Career		34	5	10.9	.538	–	.719	1.5	.8	.4	.1	5.0
