= 1984–85 Chicago Bulls season =

NBA professional basketball team season

- Head coach: Kevin Loughery
- General manager: Rod Thorn (through March 26, 1985); Jerry Krause (after March 26, 1985)
- Owner: Estate of Arthur Wirtz with other investors sold team to Jerry Reinsdorf
- Arena: Chicago Stadium

Results
- Record: 38–44 (.463)
- Place: Division: 3rd (Central); Conference: 7th (Eastern)
- Playoff finish: First round (lost to Bucks 1–3)
- Stats at Basketball Reference

Local media
- Television: WGN-TV (Milo Hamilton, Johnny “Red” Kerr); Sportsvision (Bill Hazen, John Mengelt)
- Radio: WIND (Jim Durham, Dave Baum)

The 1984–85 Chicago Bulls season was the 19th season of the franchise in the National Basketball Association (NBA). In the summer of 1984, the team's fortunes changed when it received the third pick of the NBA draft, after Houston and Portland. The Rockets selected Hakeem Olajuwon, the Blazers selected Sam Bowie, and the Bulls picked shooting guard Michael Jordan out of the University of North Carolina.

The team, with new management in owner Jerry Reinsdorf and Jerry Krause in the front office, decided to rebuild around Jordan. Jordan set franchise records during his rookie campaign for scoring (3rd in the league) and steals (4th in the league), and led the Bulls back to the playoffs, for which he was rewarded with a berth on the All-NBA second team and NBA Rookie of the Year Award. However, the Bulls lost the first round to the Milwaukee Bucks in four games.

== Draft picks ==
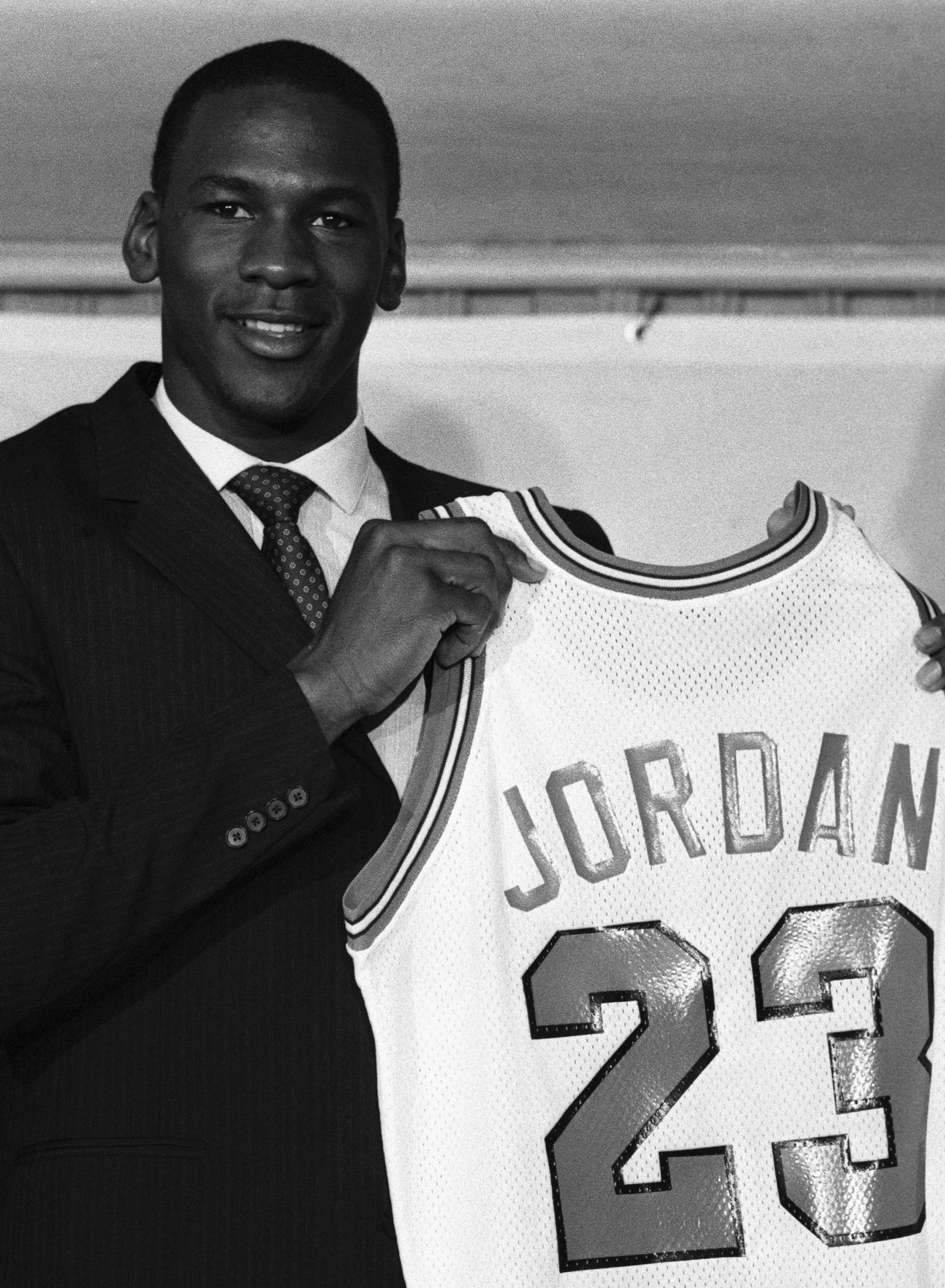
Michael Jordan was selected third overall by the Bulls.

Round	Pick	Player	Position	Nationality	School/club team
1	3	Michael Jordan	SG/SF	United States	North Carolina
2	37	Ben Coleman	PF	United States	Maryland
2	43	Greg Wiltjer	C	Canada	
3	49	Tim Dillon	F	United States	Northern Illinois
4	72	Melvin Johnson		United States	North Carolina-Charlotte
4	77	Mark Halsel		United States	Northeastern
5	95	Lamont Robinson		United States	Lamar
6	118	Tim Tipton		United States	Morehead State
7	141	Butch Hays		United States	California
8	164	Brett Crawford		United States	Alliant International
9	186	Calvin Pierce		United States	Oklahoma
10	208	Carl Lewis		United States	Houston

== Roster ==
1984–85 Chicago Bulls roster
Players

Pos.	No.	Player	Height	Weight	DOB	From
C	40	Dave Corzine	6 ft 11 in (2.11 m)	250 lb (113 kg)	1956-04-25	DePaul
G	44	Quintin Dailey	6 ft 3 in (1.91 m)	180 lb (82 kg)	1961-01-22	San Francisco
F	21	Sidney Green	6 ft 9 in (2.06 m)	220 lb (100 kg)	1961-01-04	UNLV
F	10	Dave Greenwood	6 ft 9 in (2.06 m)	222 lb (101 kg)	1957-05-27	UCLA
F	22	Rod Higgins	6 ft 7 in (2.01 m)	200 lb (91 kg)	1960-01-31	Fresno State
C	32	Steve Johnson	6 ft 10 in (2.08 m)	235 lb (107 kg)	1957-11-03	Oregon State
C	27	Caldwell Jones	6 ft 11 in (2.11 m)	217 lb (98 kg)	1950-08-04	Albany State
F	13	Charles Jones	6 ft 9 in (2.06 m)	215 lb (98 kg)	1957-04-03	Albany State
G	23	Michael Jordan	6 ft 6 in (1.98 m)	195 lb (88 kg)	1963-02-17	North Carolina
G	1	Wes Matthews	6 ft 1 in (1.85 m)	170 lb (77 kg)	1959-08-24	Wisconsin
C	33	Jawann Oldham	7 ft 0 in (2.13 m)	215 lb (98 kg)	1957-07-04	Seattle
G	3	Ennis Whatley	6 ft 3 in (1.91 m)	177 lb (80 kg)	1962-08-11	Alabama
F	0	Orlando Woolridge	6 ft 9 in (2.06 m)	215 lb (98 kg)	1959-12-16	Notre Dame

Coaches
Head coach
- Kevin Loughery
Assistant(s)
- Bill Blair
- Fred Carter
- Mike Thibault

Legend
- (DP) Unsigned draft pick
- (FA) Free agent
- (S) Suspended
- Injured

Roster
Updated: January 14, 1985

== Player stats ==
Legend
GP	Games played	GS	Games started	MPG	Minutes per game
FG%	Field-goal percentage	3P%	3-point field-goal percentage	FT%	Free-throw percentage
RPG	Rebounds per game	APG	Assists per game	SPG	Steals per game
BPG	Blocks per game	PPG	Points per game

=== Regular season ===
Player	GP	GS	MPG	FG%	3P%	FT%	RPG	APG	SPG	BPG	PPG
Dave Corzine	82	50	25.1	.486	.000	.745	5.1	1.7	.39	.78	8.5
Quintin Dailey	79	0	26.6	.473	.233	.817	2.6	2.4	.90	.06	16.0
Chris Engler	3	0	1.0	.500	.000	.000	.7	.0	.00	.00	.7
Sidney Green	48	1	15.4	.432	.000	.806	5.1	.6	.23	.29	6.1
Dave Greenwood	61	28	25.0	.458	.000	.713	6.4	1.3	.56	.30	6.1
Rod Higgins	68	5	13.9	.441	.270	.667	2.2	1.1	.31	.19	4.5
Steve Johnson	74	54	22.4	.545	.000	.718	5.9	.9	.50	.84	10.0
Caldwell Jones	42	32	21.1	.461	.000	.766	5.0	.8	.29	.74	3.4
Charles Jones	3	0	9.7	.500	.000	.667	2.0	.3	.00	1.67	2.7
Michael Jordan	82	82	38.3	.515	.173	.845	6.5	5.9	2.39	.84	28.2
Wes Matthews	78	38	19.5	.495	.125	.694	.9	4.5	.94	.15	5.7
Jawann Oldham	63	0	15.8	.464	.000	.680	3.7	.5	.17	2.02	3.4
Ennis Whatley	70	44	19.8	.447	.111	.791	1.4	5.4	.94	.14	5.0
Orlando Woolridge	77	76	36.6	.554	.000	.785	5.6	1.8	.75	.49	22.9

=== Playoffs ===
Player	GP	GS	MPG	FG%	3P%	FT%	RPG	APG	SPG	BPG	PPG
Dave Corzine	4		19.2	.667	.000	.833	5.5	.8	.50	.25	8.2
Quintin Dailey	4		32.2	.419	.143	.727	3.2	2.8	1.00	.00	15.2
Sidney Green	3		18.0	.500	.000	.636	5.0	.7	.00	.33	10.3
Dave Greenwood	4		34.8	.536	.000	.800	7.8	1.2	1.50	1.00	9.5
Rod Higgins	1		1.0	.000	.000	.000	.0	.0	.00	.00	.0
Steve Johnson	3		7.3	.286	.000	1.000	1.7	.7	.00	.00	2.0
Caldwell Jones	2		9.0	.833	.000	.000	2.5	.0	.00	.50	5.0
Michael Jordan	4		42.8	.436	.125	.828	5.8	8.5	2.75	1.00	29.2
Wes Matthews	4		22.8	.344	.000	.778	1.5	3.0	.75	.00	7.2
Jawann Oldham	4		22.8	.467	.000	.000	5.5	.8	1.50	1.75	3.5
Orlando Woolridge	4		41.8	.500	.000	.778	3.2	2.0	1.50	.25	20.5

== Regular season ==
Central Division	W	L	PCT	GB	Home	Road	Div
y-Milwaukee Bucks	59	23	.720	–	36–5	23–18	20–10
x-Detroit Pistons	46	36	.561	13	26–15	20–21	21–8
x-Chicago Bulls	38	44	.463	21	26–15	12–29	13–17
x-Cleveland Cavaliers	36	46	.439	23	20–21	16–25	13–16
Atlanta Hawks	34	48	.415	25	19–22	15–26	15–15
Indiana Pacers	22	60	.268	37	16–25	6–35	7–23

#	Eastern Conference				
#	Team	W	L	PCT	GB
1	z-Boston Celtics	63	19	.768	–
2	y-Milwaukee Bucks	59	23	.720	4
3	x-Philadelphia 76ers	58	24	.707	5
4	x-Detroit Pistons	46	36	.561	17
5	x-New Jersey Nets	42	40	.512	21
6	x-Washington Bullets	40	42	.488	23
7	x-Chicago Bulls	38	44	.463	25
8	x-Cleveland Cavaliers	36	46	.439	27
9	Atlanta Hawks	34	48	.415	29
10	New York Knicks	24	58	.293	39
11	Indiana Pacers	22	60	.268	41

== Game log ==
=== Regular season ===
1984–85 game log
Total: 38–44 (home: 26–15; road: 12–29)
October: 3–1 (home: 2–0; road: 1–1)

Game	Date	Team	Score	High points	High rebounds	High assists	Location Attendance	Record
1	October 26, 1984	Washington	W 109–93	Woolridge (28)	Woolridge, Johnson (9)	Whatley (10)	Chicago Stadium	1–0
2	October 27, 1984	@ Milwaukee	L 106–108				MECCA Arena	1–1
3	October 29, 1984	Milwaukee	W 116–110	Jordan (37)	Woolridge (12)	Jordan (5)	Chicago Stadium	2–1
4	October 30, 1984	@ Kansas City	W 109–104				Kemper Arena	3–1

November: 6–8 (home: 1–3; road: 5–5)

Game	Date	Team	Score	High points	High rebounds	High assists	Location Attendance	Record
5	November 1, 1984	@ Denver	L 113–129				McNichols Sports Arena	3–2
6	November 7, 1984	@ Detroit	W 122–118				Pontiac Silverdome	4–2
7	November 8, 1984	@ New York	W 121–106				Madison Square Garden	5–2
8	November 10, 1984	@ Indiana	W 118–116				Market Square Arena	6–2
9	November 13, 1984	San Antonio	W 120–117				Chicago Stadium	7–2
10	November 15, 1984	Boston	L 105–125				Chicago Stadium	7–3
11	November 17, 1984	Philadelphia	L 100–109				Chicago Stadium	7–4
12	November 19, 1984	Indiana	L 120–137				Chicago Stadium	7–5
13	November 21, 1984	@ Milwaukee	L 98–108				MECCA Arena	7–6
14	November 23, 1984	@ Seattle	W 113–94				Kingdome	8–6
15	November 24, 1984	@ Portland	L 131–141				Memorial Coliseum	8–7
16	November 27, 1984	@ Golden State	L 103–109				Oakland-Alameda County Coliseum Arena	8–8
17	November 29, 1984	@ Phoenix	L 95–100				Arizona Veterans Memorial Coliseum	8–9
18	November 30, 1984	@ L.A. Clippers	W 104–100				Los Angeles Memorial Sports Arena	9–9

December: 7–6 (home: 5–4; road: 2–2)

Game	Date	Team	Score	High points	High rebounds	High assists	Location Attendance	Record
19	December 2, 1984	@ L.A. Lakers	W 113–112	Dailey (28)	Greenwood (13)	Corzine (7)	The Forum; 15,505	10–9
20	December 4, 1984	New Jersey	W 112–97				Chicago Stadium	11–9
21	December 7, 1984	New York	W 95–93				Chicago Stadium	12–9
22	December 8, 1984	Dallas	W 99–97				Chicago Stadium	13–9
23	December 11, 1984	Detroit	L 101–108				Chicago Stadium	13–10
24	December 12, 1984	@ Detroit	L 95–102				Pontiac Silverdome	13–11
25	December 14, 1984	@ New Jersey	L 109–111				Brendan Byrne Arena	13–12
26	December 15, 1984	Philadelphia	L 102–114				Chicago Stadium	13–13
27	December 18, 1984	Houston	L 96–104				Chicago Stadium	13–14
28	December 20, 1984	@ Atlanta (at New Orleans, LA)	W 132–129 (2OT)				The Omni	14–14
29	December 22, 1984	Boston	W 110–85				Chicago Stadium	15–14
30	December 27, 1984	Cleveland	W 112–108				Chicago Stadium	16–14
31	December 29, 1984	Atlanta	L 101–104				Chicago Stadium	16–15

January: 8–7 (home: 8–0; road: 0–7)

Game	Date	Team	Score	High points	High rebounds	High assists	Location Attendance	Record
32	January 2, 1985	@ Atlanta	L 107–121				The Omni	17–15
33	January 4, 1985	Milwaukee	W 106–101				Chicago Stadium	17–16
34	January 5, 1985	@ New York	L 113–119				Madison Square Garden	17–17
35	January 9, 1985	@ Boston	L 108–111				Boston Garden	17–18
36	January 11, 1985	New York	W 113–97				Chicago Stadium	18–18
37	January 12, 1985	@ Cleveland	L 98–101				Richfield Coliseum	18–19
38	January 14, 1985	Denver	W 122–113				Chicago Stadium	19–19
39	January 16, 1985	@ New Jersey	L 94–100				Brendan Byrne Arena	19–20
40	January 17, 1985	Cleveland	W 98–93				Chicago Stadium	20–20
41	January 19, 1985	@ Indiana	L 107–110				Market Square Arena	20–21
42	January 22, 1985	Portland	W 123–115				Chicago Stadium	21–21
43	January 25, 1985	Seattle	W 93–76				Chicago Stadium	22–21
44	January 26, 1985	Atlanta	W 117–104				Chicago Stadium	23–21
45	January 29, 1985	Kansas City	W 103–97				Chicago Stadium	24–21
46	January 30, 1985	@ Washington	L 95–106				Capital Centre	24–22

February: 2–9 (home: 2–4; road: 0–5)

Game	Date	Team	Score	High points	High rebounds	High assists	Location Attendance	Record
47	February 1, 1985	@ Philadelphia	L 110–121				The Spectrum	24–23
48	February 5, 1985	Boston	L 106–110				Chicago Stadium	24–24
49	February 7, 1985	@ Cleveland	L 99–108				Richfield Coliseum	24–25
All-Star Break
50	February 12, 1985	Detroit	W 139–126 (OT)				Chicago Stadium	25–25
51	February 15, 1985	Indiana	L 96–114				Chicago Stadium	25–26
52	February 17, 1985	@ Milwaukee	L 105–125				MECCA Arena	25–27
53	February 19, 1985	L.A. Lakers	L 117–127	Woolridge (30)	Woolridge (6)	Jordan, Matthews (8)	Chicago Stadium; 19,052	25–28
54	February 22, 1985	@ Boston (at Hartford, CT)	L 105–115				Hartford Civic Center	25–29
55	February 23, 1985	Golden State	W 140–125				Chicago Stadium	26–29
56	February 26, 1985	Cleveland	L 118–123 (OT)				Chicago Stadium	26–30
57	February 27, 1985	@ Detroit	L 99–108				Pontiac Silverdome	26–31

March: 9–9 (home: 7–3; road: 2–6)

Game	Date	Team	Score	High points	High rebounds	High assists	Location Attendance	Record
58	March 1, 1985	New York	W 109–104				Chicago Stadium	27–31
59	March 3, 1985	New Jersey	L 113–117				Chicago Stadium	27–32
60	March 5, 1985	Washington	W 104–99				Chicago Stadium	28–32
61	March 6, 1985	@ Boston	W 107–104				Boston Garden	29–32
62	March 8, 1985	L.A. Clippers	W 117–101				Chicago Stadium	30–32
63	March 9, 1985	Utah	L 105–111				Chicago Stadium	30–33
64	March 11, 1985	@ Washington	L 112–119				Capital Centre	30–34
65	March 12, 1985	Detroit	W 111–110				Chicago Stadium	31–34
66	March 14, 1985	@ New York	L 97–106				Madison Square Garden	31–35
67	March 15, 1985	Phoenix	W 103–97				Chicago Stadium	32–35
68	March 17, 1985	Milwaukee	W 119–117 (OT)				Chicago Stadium	33–35
69	March 19, 1985	@ Houston	L 100–106				The Summit	33–36
70	March 20, 1985	@ San Antonio	L 98–106				HemisFair Arena	33–37
71	March 23, 1985	@ Dallas	W 107–97				Reunion Arena	34–37
72	March 24, 1985	@ Utah	L 92–110				Salt Palace Acord Arena	34–38
73	March 26, 1985	Indiana	W 120–119				Chicago Stadium	35–38
74	March 28, 1985	@ Cleveland	L 114–122				Richfield Coliseum	35–39
75	March 30, 1985	Philadelphia	L 117–122				Chicago Stadium	35–40

April: 3–4 (home: 1–1; road: 2–3)

Game	Date	Team	Score	High points	High rebounds	High assists	Location Attendance	Record
76	April 2, 1985	New Jersey	W 108–94				Chicago Stadium	36–40
77	April 3, 1985	@ Washington	W 100–91				Capital Centre	37–40
78	April 5, 1985	@ Philadelphia	L 113–116				The Spectrum	37–41
79	April 6, 1985	@ Atlanta	W 117–114				The Omni	38–41
80	April 8, 1985	@ Indiana	L 103–107				Market Square Arena	38–42
81	April 12, 1985	Atlanta	L 108–119				Chicago Stadium	38–43
82	April 13, 1985	@ New Jersey	L 111–123				Brendan Byrne Arena	38–44

1984–85 schedule

== Playoffs ==
1985 playoff game log
First Round: 1–3 (home: 1–1; road: 0–2)

Game	Date	Team	Score	High points	High rebounds	High assists	Location Attendance	Series
1	April 19, 1985	@ Milwaukee	L 100–109	Dailey (25)	Greenwood (13)	Jordan (10)	MECCA Arena; 11,052	0–1
2	April 21, 1985	@ Milwaukee	L 115–122	Jordan (30)	Oldham (9)	Jordan (12)	MECCA Arena; 11,052	0–2
3	April 24, 1985	Milwaukee	W 109–107	Jordan (35)	Green (9)	Jordan (7)	Chicago Stadium; 17,225	1–2
4	April 26, 1985	Milwaukee	L 97–105	Jordan (29)	Corzine (9)	Jordan (5)	Chicago Stadium; 17,787	1–3

1985 schedule

== Awards and records ==
- Michael Jordan, NBA Rookie of the Year Award
- Michael Jordan, All-NBA Second Team
- Michael Jordan, NBA All-Rookie Team 1st Team
- Michael Jordan, NBA All-Star Game
