= Cliff Robinson (basketball, born 1960) =

American basketball player (born 1960)

Personal information
- Born: March 13, 1960 (age 66) Oakland, California, U.S.
- Listed height: 6 ft 9 in (2.06 m)
- Listed weight: 220 lb (100 kg)

Career information
- High school: Castlemont (Oakland, California)
- College: USC (1977–1979)
- NBA draft: 1979: 1st round, 11th overall pick
- Drafted by: New Jersey Nets
- Playing career: 1979–1994
- Position: Small forward
- Number: 45, 44, 11, 4, 43

Career history
- 1979–1981: New Jersey Nets
- 1981–1982: Kansas City Kings
- 1982–1984: Cleveland Cavaliers
- 1984–1986: Washington Bullets
- 1986–1989: Philadelphia 76ers
- 1991–1992: Rapid City Thrillers
- 1992: Los Angeles Lakers
- 1992–1993: Rapid City Thrillers
- 1993: Miami Tropics
- 1993–1994: Milon B.C.
- 1994: Rapid City Thrillers

Career highlights
- 2× First-team All-Pac-10 (1978, 1979); California Mr. Basketball (1977)

Career NBA statistics
- Points: 10,823 (17.2 ppg)
- Rebounds: 5,237 (8.3 rpg)
- Assists: 1,249 (2.0 apg)
- Stats at NBA.com
- Stats at Basketball Reference

Clifford Trent Robinson (born March 13, 1960) is an American former professional basketball player.

== Professional career ==
A University of Southern California alumnus, Robinson was drafted into the National Basketball Association by New Jersey Nets in 1979 with the 11th overall pick in the 1979 NBA draft. Cliff was the youngest player in the NBA two years running. He gave the Nets a solid rookie season, averaging 13.6 points and 7.2 rebounds per game. His 45 points against Detroit on March 9, 1980, was the most ever scored in an NBA game by a teenager until Cooper Flagg posted 49 on January 29, 2026.

On June 8, 1981, Robinson was traded to Kansas City for Otis Birdsong. Robinson would average a career best 20.2 points in 38 games for the Kings, before being traded to the Cleveland Cavaliers. In perhaps his best game as a Cavalier, on April 15, 1983, Robinson scored 40 points and grabbed 8 rebounds in a 132–124 victory over the Indiana Pacers.

From 1979 to 1989, he steadily maintained his scoring average between roughly 18 and 20 points per game, despite playing for several teams. His best season (1985–86) came in a Washington Bullets uniform, as he achieved a career-high season total of 1,460 points in 78 games played, and shot a career-best 76.2% from the free throw line. On December 12, 1985, Robinson scored 21 points and hit a game-winning jump shot with only 1 second left in overtime to beat the Milwaukee Bucks by a margin of 110–108. That postseason, Robinson averaged 21.4 points, 8.6 rebounds, 3.4 assists, and 2 steals in a hard-fought 3–2 series loss to the Philadelphia 76ers in the first round.

In 1986, he and Jeff Ruland were traded to the Philadelphia 76ers for NBA legend Moses Malone. Robinson left the NBA in 1989, but later signed with the Los Angeles Lakers for the 1991–92 NBA season. He finished his career averaging 17.2 points, 8.3 rebounds and 2.0 assists per game.

== Career statistics ==
Legend
GP	Games played	GS	Games started	MPG	Minutes per game
FG%	Field goal percentage	3P%	3-point field goal percentage	FT%	Free throw percentage
RPG	Rebounds per game	APG	Assists per game	SPG	Steals per game
BPG	Blocks per game	PPG	Points per game	**Bold**	Career high

=== NBA ===
==== Regular season ====
Year	Team	GP	GS	MPG	FG%	3P%	FT%	RPG	APG	SPG	BPG	PPG
1979–80	New Jersey	70		23.7	.469	.250	.694	7.2	1.4	.9	.5	13.6
1980–81	New Jersey	63		28.9	**.491**	**1.000**	.718	7.6	1.7	.9	.8	19.5
1981–82	Kansas City	38	30	32.3	.455	.000	.694	8.5	1.9	1.2	**1.6**	**20.2**
1981–82	Cleveland	30	29	31.5	.451	.000	.729	9.6	1.6	1.4	1.4	16.3
1982–83	Cleveland	77	75	33.8	.477	.000	.708	**11.1**	1.9	.8	.8	18.0
1983–84	Cleveland	73	70	32.9	.450	.500	.701	10.3	**2.5**	.7	.4	17.8
1984–85	Washington	60	37	31.2	.471	.333	.742	9.1	**2.5**	.9	.8	16.7
1985–86	Washington	**78**	**78**	32.9	.474	.250	.762	8.7	2.4	1.3	.6	18.7
1986–87	Philadelphia	55	30	28.8	.464	.000	.755	5.6	1.6	**1.6**	.5	14.8
1987–88	Philadelphia	62	51	**34.0**	.464	.222	.717	6.5	2.1	1.3	.6	19.0
1988–89	Philadelphia	14	13	29.7	.481	.000	.727	5.4	2.3	1.2	.1	15.1
1991–92	L.A. Lakers	9	0	8.7	.407	.000	**.875**	2.1	1.0	.6	.0	3.2
Career		629	413	30.7	.468	.184	.722	8.3	2.0	1.0	.7	17.2

==== Playoffs ====
Year	Team	GP	GS	MPG	FG%	3P%	FT%	RPG	APG	SPG	BPG	PPG
1985	Washington	4	4	30.8	.446	–	.750	7.5	1.0	1.0	.5	14.8
1986	Washington	**5**	**5**	**35.4**	**.495**	–	.484	**8.6**	**3.4**	**2.0**	.6	**21.4**
1987	Philadelphia	**5**	**5**	27.6	.492	–	**.867**	**8.6**	1.2	.6	**1.4**	14.6
1992	L.A. Lakers	3	0	8.0	.300	–	.625	2.0	.3	1.0	.3	3.7
Career		17	14	27.2	.473	–	.636	7.2	1.6	1.2	.8	14.7
