= Charles Pittman (basketball) =

American basketball player

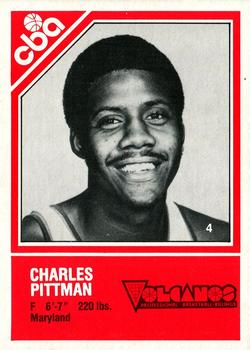

Personal information
- Born: March 23, 1958 (age 68) Rocky Mount, North Carolina, U.S.
- Listed height: 6 ft 8 in (2.03 m)
- Listed weight: 220 lb (100 kg)

Career information
- High school: Northern Nash (Rocky Mount, North Carolina)
- College: Merced College (1978–1979); Maryland (1980–1982)
- NBA draft: 1982: 3rd round, 61st overall pick
- Drafted by: Phoenix Suns
- Playing career: 1982–1998
- Position: Power forward
- Number: 32

Career history
- 1982–1983: Billings Volcanos
- 1983–1986: Phoenix Suns
- 1986–1989: Divarese Varese
- 1989–1990: Filodoro Brescia
- 1991–1992: Askatuak SBT
- 1992–1994: Okapi Aalstar
- 1994–1998: Chalonnais
- 1998: Lugano Tigers
- Stats at NBA.com
- Stats at Basketball Reference

Charles E. Pittman (born March 23, 1958) is an American former professional basketball player. Born in Rocky Mount, North Carolina, he was a 6'8" 220 lb power forward.

After playing collegiately for the Maryland Terrapins, he was selected in the third round (61st pick overall) of the 1982 NBA draft by the Phoenix Suns. He played for the Suns from 1982 to 1986 for a total of 234 games (14.1 MPG, 4.5 PPG and 3.1 RPG). Later he played professionally in Italy for Divarese Varese (1986–89) and Filodoro Brescia (Serie A2, 1989–91, also known as Telemarket Brescia). 1992-94 Okapi Aalstar (Belgium) He finished his career with Élan Sportif Chalonnais (1994–1998).

== Career statistics ==
Legend
GP	Games played	GS	Games started	MPG	Minutes per game
FG%	Field goal percentage	3P%	3-point field goal percentage	FT%	Free throw percentage
RPG	Rebounds per game	APG	Assists per game	SPG	Steals per game
BPG	Blocks per game	PPG	Points per game	**Bold**	Career high

=== NBA ===
==== Regular season ====
Year	Team	GP	GS	MPG	FG%	3P%	FT%	RPG	APG	SPG	BPG	PPG
1982–83	Phoenix	28	0	6.1	.475	.000	.676	1.1	.3	.1	**.3**	2.3
1983–84	Phoenix	**69**	8	14.3	**.603**	.000	.683	3.1	**1.0**	.2	**.3**	4.7
1984–85	Phoenix	68	3	14.7	.471	.000	**.747**	3.3	**1.0**	.3	**.3**	4.8
1985–86	Phoenix	**69**	**17**	**16.4**	.583	–	.702	**3.6**	.8	**.5**	**.3**	**5.1**
Career		234	28	14.1	.546	.000	.711	3.1	.9	.3	.3	4.5

==== Playoffs ====
Year	Team	GP	GS	MPG	FG%	3P%	FT%	RPG	APG	SPG	BPG	PPG
1983	Phoenix	1		1.0	–	–	–	.0	.0	.0	.0	.0
1984	Phoenix	**17**		14.9	.549	.000	.621	3.8	.7	**.3**	.3	4.4
1985	Phoenix	3	3	**27.3**	**.609**	–	**.706**	**6.3**	**3.0**	.0	**1.0**	**13.3**
Career		21	3	16.0	.568	.000	.652	4.0	1.0	.2	.4	5.4
