= 1984–85 Milwaukee Bucks season =

NBA basketball season

- Division champions
- Head coach: Don Nelson
- General manager: Don Nelson
- Owner: Jim Fitzgerald
- Arena: MECCA Arena

Results
- Record: 59–23 (.720)
- Place: Division: 1st (Central); Conference: 2nd (Eastern)
- Playoff finish: Conference semifinals (lost to 76ers 0–4)
- Stats at Basketball Reference

Local media
- Television: WVTV, Sportsvue
- Radio: WTMJ

The 1984-85 Milwaukee Bucks season was the Bucks' 17th season in the NBA. For the first time since 1976–77 season, Marques Johnson was not on the opening day roster.

== Draft picks ==
Round	Pick	Player	Position	Nationality	College
1	21	Kenny Fields	SF/SG	United States	UCLA
3	67	Vernon Delancy		United States	Florida
5	113	Ernie Floyd		United States	Holy Cross
6	120	McKinley Singleton	G	United States	Alabama-Birmingham
6	136	Mike Reddick		United States	Stetson
7	159	Tony William		United States	Florida State
8	182	Brad Jergenson		United States	South Carolina
9	204	Edwin Green		United States	Massachusetts Amherst
10	226	Mike Toomer		United States	Florida A&M

== Roster ==
1984–85 Milwaukee Bucks roster
Players

Pos.	No.	Player	Height	Weight	DOB	From
C	45	Randy Breuer	7 ft 3 in (2.21 m)	230 lb (104 kg)	1960–10–11	Minnesota
PF	34	Terry Cummings	6 ft 9 in (2.06 m)	220 lb (100 kg)	1961–03–15	DePaul
SF	24	Charles Davis	6 ft 7 in (2.01 m)	215 lb (98 kg)	1958–10–05	Vanderbilt
PG	10	Mike Dunleavy Sr. (injured)	6 ft 3 in (1.91 m)	180 lb (82 kg)	1954–03–21	South Carolina
C	50	Chris Engler	6 ft 11 in (2.11 m)	245 lb (111 kg)	1959–03–01	Wyoming
SF	7	Kenny Fields	6 ft 5 in (1.96 m)	220 lb (100 kg)	1962–02–09	UCLA
SF	35	Kevin Grevey	6 ft 5 in (1.96 m)	210 lb (95 kg)	1953–05–12	Kentucky
SG	15	Craig Hodges	6 ft 2 in (1.88 m)	190 lb (86 kg)	1960–06–27	Long Beach State
C	53	Alton Lister	7 ft 0 in (2.13 m)	240 lb (109 kg)	1958–10–01	Arizona State
C	44	Paul Mokeski	7 ft 0 in (2.13 m)	250 lb (113 kg)	1957–01–03	Kansas
PG	4	Sidney Moncrief	6 ft 3 in (1.91 m)	180 lb (82 kg)	1957–09–21	Arkansas
SG	22	Ricky Pierce	6 ft 4 in (1.93 m)	205 lb (93 kg)	1959–08–19	Rice
SF	25	Paul Pressey	6 ft 5 in (1.96 m)	185 lb (84 kg)	1958–12–24	Tulsa
SF	6	Paul Thompson	6 ft 6 in (1.98 m)	210 lb (95 kg)	1961–05–25	Tulane

Coaches
Head coach
- Don Nelson
Assistant(s)
- Mike Schuler
- Garry St. Jean

Legend
- (DP) Unsigned draft pick
- (FA) Free agent
- (S) Suspended
- (L) On leave from the team
- Injured

Roster

== Regular season ==
=== Season standings ===
Central Division	W	L	PCT	GB	Home	Road	Div
y-Milwaukee Bucks	59	23	.720	–	36–5	23–18	20–10
x-Detroit Pistons	46	36	.561	13	26–15	20–21	21–8
x-Chicago Bulls	38	44	.463	21	26–15	12–29	13–17
x-Cleveland Cavaliers	36	46	.439	23	20–21	16–25	13–16
Atlanta Hawks	34	48	.415	25	19–22	15–26	15–15
Indiana Pacers	22	60	.268	37	16–25	6–35	7–23

#	Eastern Conference				
#	Team	W	L	PCT	GB
1	z-Boston Celtics	63	19	.768	–
2	y-Milwaukee Bucks	59	23	.720	4
3	x-Philadelphia 76ers	58	24	.707	5
4	x-Detroit Pistons	46	36	.561	17
5	x-New Jersey Nets	42	40	.512	21
6	x-Washington Bullets	40	42	.488	23
7	x-Chicago Bulls	38	44	.463	25
8	x-Cleveland Cavaliers	36	46	.439	27
9	Atlanta Hawks	34	48	.415	29
10	New York Knicks	24	58	.293	39
11	Indiana Pacers	22	60	.268	41

z - clinched division title
y - clinched division title
x - clinched playoff spot

== Game log ==
=== Regular season ===
1984–85 game log
Total: 59–23 (home: 36–5; road: 23–18)
October: 2–1 (home: 2–0; road: 0–1)

Game	Date	Team	Score	High points	High rebounds	High assists	Location Attendance	Record
1	October 27, 1984	Chicago	W 108–106				MECCA Arena	1–0
2	October 29, 1984	@ Chicago	L 110–116				Chicago Stadium	1–1
3	October 31, 1984	Washington	W 105–79				MECCA Arena	2–1

November: 9–6 (home: 6–0; road: 3–6)

Game	Date	Team	Score	High points	High rebounds	High assists	Location Attendance	Record
4	November 2, 1984	@ Washington	W 102–96				Capital Centre	3–1
5	November 3, 1984	Cleveland	W 117–88				MECCA Arena	4–1
6	November 7, 1984	Atlanta	W 103–99				MECCA Arena	5–1
7	November 9, 1984	Indiana	W 122–105				MECCA Arena	6–1
8	November 10, 1984	@ Detroit	L 100–104				Pontiac Silverdome	6–2
9	November 13, 1984	@ Atlanta	W 110–99				The Omni	7–2
10	November 15, 1984	@ L.A. Clippers	W 103–90				Los Angeles Memorial Sports Arena	8–2
11	November 16, 1984	@ Phoenix	L 106–118				Arizona Veterans Memorial Coliseum	8–3
12	November 18, 1984; 9:30 p.m. CST	@ L.A. Lakers	L 89–96	Cummings (29)	Cummings (10)	Dunleavy, Pressey (6)	The Forum; 12,768	8–4
13	November 20, 1984	@ Dallas	L 108–109				Reunion Arena	8–5
14	November 21, 1984	Chicago	W 108–98				MECCA Arena	9–5
15	November 24, 1984	Golden State	W 103–97				MECCA Arena	10–5
16	November 27, 1984	@ Indiana	L 105–126				Market Square Arena	10–6
17	November 28, 1984	@ Atlanta (at New Orleans, LA)	L 83–95				Lakefront Arena	10–7
18	November 30, 1984	New York	W 118–100				MECCA Arena	11–7

December: 11–4 (home: 7–1; road: 4–3)

Game	Date	Team	Score	High points	High rebounds	High assists	Location Attendance	Record
19	December 1, 1984	@ Washington	L 97–100				Capital Centre	11–8
20	December 5, 1984	@ Philadelphia	L 111–112				The Spectrum	11–9
21	December 6, 1984	Detroit	W 114–99				MECCA Arena	12–9
22	December 8, 1984	Indiana	W 99–96				MECCA Arena	13–9
23	December 11, 1984	@ Cleveland	W 120–106				Richfield Coliseum	14–9
24	December 12, 1984	@ New Jersey	L 109–116				Brendan Byrne Arena	14–10
25	December 14, 1984	Philadelphia	L 111–115				MECCA Arena	14–11
26	December 16, 1984	Utah	W 115–102				MECCA Arena	15–11
27	December 18, 1984	Dallas	W 110–96				MECCA Arena	16–11
28	December 19, 1984	@ Boston	W 107–92				Boston Garden	17–11
29	December 21, 1984	@ Philadelphia	W 104–101				The Spectrum	18–11
30	December 22, 1984	San Antonio	W 101–90				MECCA Arena	19–11
31	December 26, 1984	Houston	W 97–87				MECCA Arena	20–11
32	December 29, 1984	@ Cleveland	W 115–102				Richfield Coliseum	21–11
33	December 30, 1984	Boston	W 114–98				MECCA Arena	22–11

January: 10–3 (home: 5–2; road: 5–1)

Game	Date	Team	Score	High points	High rebounds	High assists	Location Attendance	Record
34	January 3, 1985	L.A. Clippers	W 111–87				MECCA Arena	23–11
35	January 4, 1985	@ Chicago	L 101–106				Chicago Stadium	23–12
36	January 5, 1985	Philadelphia	L 106–110				MECCA Arena	23–13
37	January 8, 1985	Washington	L 95–99				MECCA Arena	23–14
38	January 9, 1985	@ Indiana	W 106–105				Market Square Arena	24–14
39	January 11, 1985	Cleveland	W 130–117				MECCA Arena	25–14
40	January 13, 1985	Denver	W 140–116				MECCA Arena	26–14
41	January 15, 1985; 7:30 p.m. CST	L.A. Lakers	W 115–105	Cummings (39)	Cummings, Lister (9)	Pressey (12)	MECCA Arena; 11,052	27–14
42	January 18, 1985	New Jersey	W 102–93				MECCA Arena	28–14
43	January 24, 1985	@ Kansas City	W 120–119				Kemper Arena	29–14
44	January 26, 1985	@ Houston	W 105–102				The Summit	30–14
45	January 27, 1985	@ San Antonio	W 106–93				HemisFair Arena	31–14
46	January 29, 1985	@ Golden State	W 108–101				Oakland-Alamdea County Coliseum Arena	32–14

February: 9–4 (home: 3–2; road: 6–2)

Game	Date	Team	Score	High points	High rebounds	High assists	Location Attendance	Record
47	February 1, 1985	@ Seattle	W 109–91				Kingdome	32–15
48	February 2, 1985	@ Portland	W 105–95				Memorial Coliseum	33–15
49	February 4, 1985	Detroit	L 111–113 (OT)				MECCA Arena	34–15
50	February 6, 1985	@ New Jersey	L 93–106				Brendan Byrne Arena	34–16
51	February 7, 1985	Atlanta	L 91–94 (OT)				MECCA Arena	34–17
All-Star Break
52	February 12, 1985	New Jersey	W 111–103				MECCA Arena	35–17
53	February 14, 1985	@ Indiana	W 132–128 (OT)				Market Square Arena	36–17
54	February 17, 1985	Chicago	W 125–105				MECCA Arena	37–17
55	February 19, 1985	@ New York	W 129–118				Madison Square Garden	38–17
56	February 20, 1985	@ Detroit	W 113–112				Pontiac Silverdome	39–17
57	February 23, 1985	@ Cleveland	L 106–128				Richfield Coliseum	39–18
58	February 26, 1985	Philadelphia	W 116–97				MECCA Arena	40–18
59	February 27, 1985	@ Utah	W 119–100				Salt Palace Acord Arena	41–18

March: 13–3 (home: 9–0; road: 4–3)

Game	Date	Team	Score	High points	High rebounds	High assists	Location Attendance	Record
60	March 2, 1985	@ Denver	L 140–116				McNichols Sports Arena	41–19
61	March 5, 1985	Seattle	W 102–87				MECCA Arena	42–19
62	March 8, 1985	Kansas City	W 127–114				MECCA Arena	43–19
63	March 10, 1985	Portland	W 110–94				MECCA Arena	44–19
64	March 11, 1985	@ Atlanta	W 121–115				The Omni	45–19
65	March 13, 1985	Cleveland	W 128–93				MECCA Arena	46–19
66	March 16, 1985	Phoenix	W 125–96				MECCA Arena	47–19
67	March 17, 1985	@ Chicago	L 117–119 (OT)				Chicago Stadium	47–20
68	March 19, 1985	New Jersey	W 130–111				MECCA Arena	48–20
69	March 20, 1985	@ Boston	L 105–107				Boston Garden	48–21
70	March 22, 1985	@ Philadelphia	W 131–112				The Spectrum	49–21
71	March 23, 1985	Indiana	W 140–129				MECCA Arena	50–21
72	March 25, 1985	New York	W 126–106				MECCA Arena	51–21
73	March 26, 1985	@ Washington	W 107–96				Capital Centre	52–21
74	March 28, 1985	@ New York	W 121–116				Madison Square Garden	53–21
75	March 30, 1985	Atlanta	W 106–95				MECCA Arena	54–21

April: 5–2 (home: 4–0; road: 1–2)

Game	Date	Team	Score	High points	High rebounds	High assists	Location Attendance	Record
76	April 2, 1985	Boston	W 109–103				MECCA Arena	55–21
77	April 4, 1985	Detroit	W 130–121				MECCA Arena	56–21
78	April 6, 1985	@ New Jersey	L 104–108				Brendan Byrne Arena	56–22
79	April 7, 1985	@ Detroit	L 91–113				Pontiac Silverdome	56–23
80	April 10, 1985	Washington	W 106–97				MECCA Arena	57–23
81	April 12, 1985	@ Boston	W 115–113 (OT)				Boston Garden	58–23
82	April 13, 1985	New York	W 88–84				MECCA Arena	59–23

1984–85 schedule

=== Playoffs ===
1985 playoff game log
First Round: 3–1 (home: 2–0; road: 1–1)

Game	Date	Team	Score	High points	High rebounds	High assists	Location Attendance	Series
1	April 19, 1985	Chicago	W 109–100	Moncrief (30)	Mokeski (10)	Pressey (9)	MECCA Arena; 11,052	1–0
2	April 21, 1985	Chicago	W 122–115	Cummings (30)	Cummings (9)	Cummings (11)	MECCA Arena; 11,052	2–0
3	April 24, 1985	@ Chicago	L 107–109	Cummings (37)	Cummings (9)	Moncrief, Pressey (5)	Chicago Stadium; 17,225	2–1
4	April 26, 1985	@ Chicago	W 105–97	Cummings (29)	Cummings (12)	Pressey (4)	Chicago Stadium; 17,787	3–1

Conference semifinals: 0–4 (home: 0–2; road: 0–2)

Game	Date	Team	Score	High points	High rebounds	High assists	Location Attendance	Series
1	April 28, 1985	Philadelphia	L 105–127	Cummings (17)	Pressey (10)	Hodges, Pressey (8)	MECCA Arena; 11,052	0–1
2	April 30, 1985	Philadelphia	L 108–112	Cummings (41)	Cummings, Lister (12)	Pressey (16)	MECCA Arena; 11,052	0–2
3	May 3, 1985	@ Philadelphia	L 104–109	Cummings (21)	Cummings, Lister (8)	Pressey (7)	The Spectrum; 14,188	0–3
4	May 5, 1985	@ Philadelphia	L 112–121	Moncrief, Pressey (25)	Lister (14)	Moncrief (8)	The Spectrum; 15,264	0–4

1985 schedule

== Player statistics ==
Legend
GP	Games played	GS	Games started	MPG	Minutes per game
FG%	Field-goal percentage	3P%	3-point field-goal percentage	FT%	Free-throw percentage
RPG	Rebounds per game	APG	Assists per game	SPG	Steals per game
BPG	Blocks per game	PPG	Points per game

=== Season ===
Player	GP	GS	MPG	FG%	3FG%	FT%	RPG	APG	SPG	BPG	PPG
Terry Cummings	79	78	34.5	49.5	0.0	74.1	9.1	2.9	1.5	0.8	23.6
Sidney Moncrief	73	72	37.5	48.3	27.3	82.8	5.4	5.2	1.6	0.5	21.7
Paul Pressey	80	80	36.0	51.7	35.0	75.8	5.4	6.8	1.6	0.7	16.1
Craig Hodges	82	63	30.4	49.0	34.8	81.5	2.3	4.3	1.2	0.0	10.6
Alton Lister	81	80	25.8	53.8	0.0	58.8	8.0	1.6	0.6	2.1	9.9
Ricky Pierce	44	3	20.0	53.7	25.0	82.3	2.7	2.1	0.8	0.1	9.8
Mike Dunleavy	19	19	22.8	47.4	34.0	86.2	1.6	4.5	0.8	0.2	8.9
Paul Thompson	16	0	14.2	39.0	0.0	70.6	2.6	1.3	0.9	0.3	6.6
Paul Mokeski	79	6	20.1	47.8	0.0	69.8	5.2	1.3	0.4	0.4	6.2
Charles Davis	57	2	13.1	43.6	10.0	82.8	2.6	0.9	0.4	0.1	6.2
Kevin Grevey	78	6	15.2	44.8	24.2	82.2	1.3	1.2	0.4	0.0	6.1
Randy Breuer	78	0	13.9	51.1	0.0	70.1	3.3	0.5	0.3	1.1	5.3
Kenny Fields	51	1	10.5	44.0	0.0	75.0	1.6	0.7	0.2	0.2	3.8
Larry Micheaux	18	0	9.5	48.6	0.0	70.6	2.4	0.7	0.4	0.4	2.6
Mark West	1	0	6.0	0.0	0.0	100.0	1.0	0.0	0.0	1.0	2.0
David Thirdkill	6	0	2.7	75.0	0.0	50.0	0.3	0.0	0.0	0.0	1.2
Lorenzo Romar	4	0	4.0	12.5	0.0	0.0	0.0	0.5	0.0	0.0	0.5
Chris Engler	1	0	3.0	0.0	0.0	0.0	1.0	0.0	0.0	1.0	0.0

=== Playoffs ===
Player	GP	GS	MPG	FG%	3FG%	FT%	RPG	APG	SPG	BPG	PPG
Terry Cummings	8	8	38.9	57.7	0.0	82.8	8.8	2.5	1.5	0.9	27.5
Sidney Moncrief	8	7	39.9	55.6	40.0	93.3	4.3	5.0	0.6	0.5	23.0
Paul Pressey	8	8	37.0	51.1	33.3	81.6	6.0	7.6	2.3	0.6	15.3
Ricky Pierce	8	1	24.8	49.3	0.0	77.8	2.3	1.9	0.4	0.1	9.9
Alton Lister	8	8	25.4	45.0	0.0	46.9	7.8	1.9	0.8	1.9	8.6
Craig Hodges	8	8	27.0	36.4	17.4	80.0	1.6	3.3	1.5	0.1	8.0
Paul Mokeski	8	0	19.3	44.4	0.0	100.0	4.3	1.5	0.3	0.5	5.5
Randy Breuer	8	0	13.0	57.7	0.0	66.7	3.0	0.0	0.3	0.3	5.5
Paul Thompson	3	0	11.3	41.7	0.0	60.0	1.7	0.7	1.3	0.3	4.3
Charles Davis	5	0	10.2	40.0	0.0	75.0	2.0	0.8	0.0	0.0	3.8
Kevin Grevey	5	0	5.6	30.8	0.0	100.0	0.4	0.4	0.4	0.0	2.4
Chris Engler	1	0	6.0	100.0	0.0	0.0	2.0	0.0	0.0	0.0	2.0

== Awards and records ==
- Don Nelson, NBA Coach of the Year Award
- Sidney Moncrief, All-NBA Second Team
- Terry Cummings, All-NBA Second Team
- Sidney Moncrief, NBA All-Defensive First Team
- Paul Pressey, NBA All-Defensive First Team

== Transactions ==
=== Trades ===
September 29, 1984
To Milwaukee Bucks----
- Terry Cummings
- Craig Hodges
- Ricky Pierce
To Los Angeles Clippers----
- Junior Bridgeman
- Harvey Catchings
- Marques Johnson

== See also ==
- 1984-85 NBA season
