= 1984–85 New Jersey Nets season =

NBA professional basketball team season

- Head coach: Stan Albeck
- General manager: Lewis Schaffel
- Owners: Secaucus Seven (led by Alan N. Cohen and Joseph Taub)
- Arena: Brendan Byrne Arena

Results
- Record: 42–40 (.512)
- Place: Division: 3rd (Atlantic); Conference: 5th (Eastern)
- Playoff finish: First round (lost to Pistons 0–3)
- Stats at Basketball Reference

Local media
- Television: WOR-TV; SportsChannel New York
- Radio: WNBC

The 1984–85 New Jersey Nets season was the Nets' ninth season in the NBA.

== Draft picks ==
Round	Pick	Player	Position	Nationality	College
1	17	Jeff Turner	PF	United States	Vanderbilt
3	63	Yommy Sangodeyi		Nigeria	Sam Houston State
4	85	Hank Cornley		United States	Illinois State
5	109	Michael Gerren		United States	South Alabama
6	131	Oscar Schmidt	SG/SF	Brazil	
7	155	Sean Kerins		United States	Syracuse
8	177	Chris Winans		United States	Utah
9	200	Billy Ryan		United States	Princeton
10	221	Phil Jamison		United States	Saint Peter's

== Roster ==
1984–85 New Jersey Nets roster
Players

Pos.	No.	Player	Height	Weight	DOB	From
SG	10	Otis Birdsong (injured)	6 ft 3 in (1.91 m)	190 lb (86 kg)	1955-12-09	Houston
SG	22	Ron Brewer	6 ft 4 in (1.93 m)	180 lb (82 kg)	1955-09-16	Arkansas
PG	12	Darwin Cook	6 ft 3 in (1.91 m)	184 lb (83 kg)	1958-08-06	Portland
C	53	Darryl Dawkins	6 ft 11 in (2.11 m)	251 lb (114 kg)	1957-01-11	Maynard Evans HS (FL)
C	42	Mike Gminski	6 ft 11 in (2.11 m)	250 lb (113 kg)	1959-08-03	Duke
C	43	George Johnson	6 ft 11 in (2.11 m)	205 lb (93 kg)	1948-12-18	Dillard
SF	55	Albert King	6 ft 6 in (1.98 m)	190 lb (86 kg)	1959-12-17	Maryland
SG	33	Kevin McKenna	6 ft 5 in (1.96 m)	195 lb (88 kg)	1959-01-08	Creighton
SF	31	Mike O'Koren	6 ft 7 in (2.01 m)	207 lb (94 kg)	1958-02-07	North Carolina
PG	14	Kelvin Ransey	6 ft 1 in (1.85 m)	170 lb (77 kg)	1958-05-03	Ohio State
PG	20	Micheal Ray Richardson	6 ft 5 in (1.96 m)	189 lb (86 kg)	1955-04-11	Montana
PF	22	Wayne Sappleton	6 ft 9 in (2.06 m)	215 lb (98 kg)	1960-11-17	Loyola Chicago
PF	35	Jeff Turner	6 ft 9 in (2.06 m)	230 lb (104 kg)	1962-04-09	Vanderbilt
PF	52	Buck Williams	6 ft 8 in (2.03 m)	215 lb (98 kg)	1954-10-14	Maryland

Coaches
Head coach
- Stan Albeck
Assistant(s)
- John Killilea
- Herman Kull

Legend
- (DP) Unsigned draft pick
- (FA) Free agent
- (S) Suspended
- Injured

Roster

== Regular season ==
=== Season standings ===
Atlantic Division	W	L	PCT	GB	Home	Road	Div
y-Boston Celtics	63	19	.768	–	35–6	28–13	19–5
x-Philadelphia 76ers	58	24	.707	5	34–7	24–17	15–9
x-New Jersey Nets	42	40	.512	21	27–14	15–26	13–11
x-Washington Bullets	40	42	.488	23	28–13	12–29	11–13
New York Knicks	24	58	.293	39	19–22	5–36	2–22

#	Eastern Conference				
#	Team	W	L	PCT	GB
1	z-Boston Celtics	63	19	.768	–
2	y-Milwaukee Bucks	59	23	.720	4
3	x-Philadelphia 76ers	58	24	.707	5
4	x-Detroit Pistons	46	36	.561	17
5	x-New Jersey Nets	42	40	.512	21
6	x-Washington Bullets	40	42	.488	23
7	x-Chicago Bulls	38	44	.463	25
8	x-Cleveland Cavaliers	36	46	.439	27
9	Atlanta Hawks	34	48	.415	29
10	New York Knicks	24	58	.293	39
11	Indiana Pacers	22	60	.268	41

== Game log ==
=== Regular season ===
1984–85 game log
Total: 42–40 (home: 27–14; road: 15–26)
October: 1–3 (home: 0–2; road: 1–1)

Game	Date	Team	Score	High points	High rebounds	High assists	Location Attendance	Record
1	October 26, 1984	Atlanta	L 104–119				Brendan Byrne Arena	0–1
2	October 27, 1984	@ Cleveland	W 131–106				Richfield Coliseum	1–1
3	October 30, 1984	Philadelphia	L 96–118				Brendan Byrne Arena	1–2
4	October 31, 1984	@ Boston	L 105–116				Boston Garden	1–3

November: 7–5 (home: 4–1; road: 3–4)

Game	Date	Team	Score	High points	High rebounds	High assists	Location Attendance	Record
5	November 3, 1984	Indiana	W 118–117				Brendan Byrne Arena	2–3
6	November 7, 1984	Washington	W 99–88				Brendan Byrne Arena	3–3
7	November 9, 1984	Kansas City	L 99–101				Brendan Byrne Arena	3–4
8	November 11, 1984; 10:30 p.m. EST	@ L.A. Lakers	L 111–121	King (22)	Williams (10)	Richardson (8)	The Forum; 13,257	3–5
9	November 13, 1984	@ L.A. Clippers	W 99–90				Los Angeles Memorial Sports Arena	4–5
10	November 14, 1984	@ Phoenix	L 86–98				Arizona Veterans Memorial Coliseum	4–6
11	November 17, 1984	@ Golden State	W 131–114				Oakland-Alameda County Coliseum Arena	5–6
12	November 18, 1984	@ Seattle	W 102–97				Kingdome	6–6
13	November 20, 1984	@ Portland	L 107–117 (OT)				Memorial Coliseum	6–7
14	November 24, 1984	@ Atlanta	L 99–101				The Omni	6–8
15	November 28, 1984	New York	W 111–96				Brendan Byrne Arena	7–8
16	November 30, 1984	Indiana	W 123–100				Brendan Byrne Arena	8–8

December: 7–9 (home: 5–3; road: 2–6)

Game	Date	Team	Score	High points	High rebounds	High assists	Location Attendance	Record
17	December 2, 1984	@ Philadelphia	L 112–114				The Spectrum	8–9
18	December 4, 1984	@ Chicago	L 97–112				Chicago Stadium	8–10
19	December 5, 1984; 7:30 p.m. EST	L.A. Lakers	L 93–104	Birdsong (26)	Sappleton (11)	Richardson (11)	Brendan Byrne Arena; 14,532	8–11
20	December 8, 1984	Boston	L 98–107				Brendan Byrne Arena	8–12
21	December 11, 1984	@ Boston (at Hartford, CT)	L 121–130				Hartford Civic Center	8–13
22	December 12, 1984	Milwaukee	W 116–109				Brendan Byrne Arena	9–13
23	December 14, 1984	Chicago	W 111–109				Brendan Byrne Arena	10–13
24	December 15, 1984	@ Indiana	L 100–112				Market Square Arena	10–14
25	December 18, 1984	@ Washington	L 95–104				Capital Centre	10–15
26	December 19, 1984	Washington	W 115–106				Brendan Byrne Arena	11–15
27	December 21, 1984	San Antonio	L 116–122				Brendan Byrne Arena	11–16
28	December 22, 1984	@ Philadelphia	L 93–107				The Spectrum	11–17
29	December 25, 1985	@ New York	W 120–114				Madison Square Garden	12–17
30	December 26, 1984	Detroit	W 112–97				Brendan Byrne Arena	13–17
31	December 28, 1984	New York	W 100–97				Brendan Byrne Arena	14–17
32	December 29, 1984	@ Detroit	W 110–108				Pontiac Silverdome	15–17

January: 6–9 (home: 5–2; road: 1–7)

Game	Date	Team	Score	High points	High rebounds	High assists	Location Attendance	Record
33	January 2, 1985	Boston	L 95–110				Brendan Byrne Arena	15–18
34	January 4, 1985	Phoenix	W 105–98				Brendan Byrne Arena	16–18
35	January 5, 1985	@ Atlanta	L 114–124				The Omni	16–19
36	January 8, 1985	@ Cleveland	L 101–107				Richfield Coliseum	16–20
37	January 11, 1985	Atlanta	W 122–103				Brendan Byrne Arena	17–20
38	January 13, 1985	Houston	W 100–99				Brendan Byrne Arena	18–20
39	January 16, 1985	Chicago	W 100–94				Brendan Byrne Arena	19–20
40	January 18, 1985	@ Milwaukee	L 93–102				MECCA Arena	19–21
41	January 19, 1985	Detroit	L 107–109				Brendan Byrne Arena	19–22
42	January 22, 1985	@ Utah	L 99–102				Salt Palace Acord Arena	19–23
43	January 24, 1985	@ Denver	L 110–119				McNichols Sports Arena	19–24
44	January 26, 1985	@ Dallas	W 103–93				Reunion Arena	20–24
45	January 28, 1985	@ Houston	L 93–97				The Summit	20–25
46	January 29, 1985	@ San Antonio	L 127–130				HemisFair Arena	20–26
47	January 31, 1985	L.A. Clippers	W 122–99				Brendan Byrne Arena	21–26

February: 8–3 (home: 5–2; road: 3–1)

Game	Date	Team	Score	High points	High rebounds	High assists	Location Attendance	Record
48	February 2, 1985	Philadelphia	W 101–96				Brendan Byrne Arena	22–26
49	February 5, 1985	@ Detroit	W 119–117				Pontiac Silverdome	23–26
50	February 6, 1985	Milwaukee	W 106–93				Brendan Byrne Arena	24–26
All-Star Break
51	February 12, 1985	@ Milwaukee	L 103–111				MECCA Arena	24–27
52	February 13, 1985	Cleveland	W 112–105				Brendan Byrne Arena	25–27
53	February 15, 1985	Detroit	W 124–123				Brendan Byrne Arena	26–27
54	February 16, 1985	@ New York	W 126–117				Brendan Byrne Arena	27–27
55	February 20, 1985	Utah	L 104–110 (OT)				Brendan Byrne Arena	27–28
56	February 22, 1985	Golden State	L 127–131				Brendan Byrne Arena	27–29
57	February 23, 1985	@ Detroit	W 111–103				Pontiac Silverdome	28–29
58	February 27, 1985	Atlanta	W 114–91				Brendan Byrne Arena	29–29

March: 8–9 (home: 4–4; road: 4–5)

Game	Date	Team	Score	High points	High rebounds	High assists	Location Attendance	Record
59	March 1, 1985	@ Washington	W 100–98				Capital Centre	30–29
60	March 3, 1985	@ Chicago	W 117–113				Chicago Stadium	31–29
61	March 5, 1985	@ Kansas City	L 113–134				Kemper Arena	31–30
62	March 6, 1985	Seattle	W 129–108				Brendan Byrne Arena	32–30
63	March 8, 1985	Portland	L 110–128				Brendan Byrne Arena	32–31
64	March 10, 1985	Dallas	L 113–126				Brendan Byrne Arena	32–32
65	March 12, 1985	@ Indiana	L 108–109				Market Square Arena	32–33
66	March 13, 1985	Washington	W 114–109				Brendan Byrne Arena	33–33
67	March 16, 1985	@ Philadelphia	L 107–127				The Spectrum	33–34
68	March 17, 1985	Indiana	W 129–105				Brendan Byrne Arena	34–34
69	March 19, 1985	@ Milwaukee	L 111–130				MECCA Arena	34–35
70	March 20, 1985	Cleveland	W 128–108				Brendan Byrne Arena	35–35
71	March 22, 1985	Denver	L 111–123				Brendan Byrne Arena	35–36
72	March 26, 1985	@ Atlanta at (New Orleans, LA)	W 109–108 (OT)				Lakefront Arena	36–36
73	March 27, 1985	Boston	L 95–105				Brendan Byrne Arena	36–37
74	March 29, 1985	@ Washington	L 98–122				Capital Centre	36–38
75	March 30, 1985	@ New York	W 123–114				Madison Square Garden	37–38

April: 5–2 (home: 4–0; road: 1–2)

Game	Date	Team	Score	High points	High rebounds	High assists	Location Attendance	Record
76	April 2, 1985	@ Chicago	L 94–108				Chicago Stadium	37–39
77	April 3, 1985	New York	W 113–100				Brendan Byrne Arena	38–39
78	April 6, 1985	Milwaukee	W 108–104				Brendan Byrne Arena	39–39
79	April 9, 1985	@ Cleveland	L 100–114				Richfield Coliseum	39–40
80	April 10, 1985	Philadelphia	W 125–100				Brendan Byrne Arena	40–40
81	April 13, 1985	Chicago	W 123–111				Brendan Byrne Arena	41–40
82	April 14, 1985	@ Boston	W 129–118				Boston Garden	42–40

1984–85 schedule

=== Playoffs ===
1985 playoff game log
First round: 0–3 (home: 0–1; road: 0–2)

Game	Date	Team	Score	High points	High rebounds	High assists	Location Attendance	Series
1	April 18, 1985	@ Detroit	L 105–125	Williams (23)	Williams (9)	Richardson (10)	Joe Louis Arena; 10,465	0–1
2	April 21, 1985	@ Detroit	L 111–121	Williams (23)	Williams (11)	Richardson (14)	Joe Louis Arena; 11,501	0–2
3	April 24, 1985	Detroit	L 115–116	Williams, King (28)	Williams (12)	Richardson (10)	Brendan Byrne Arena; 9,999	0–3

1985 schedule

== See also ==
- 1984–85 NBA season
