= 1984–85 Indiana Pacers season =

NBA professional basketball team season

- Head coach: George Irvine
- Arena: Market Square Arena

Results
- Record: 22–60 (.268)
- Place: Division: 6th (Central); Conference: 11th (Eastern)
- Playoff finish: Did not qualify
- Stats at Basketball Reference

Local media
- Television: WTTV (Jerry Gross)
- Radio: WNDE (Greg Papa)

The 1984–85 Indiana Pacers season was Indiana's ninth season in the NBA and 18th season as a franchise.

== Offseason ==
=== Draft picks ===
This table only lists picks through the second round.

Round	Pick	Player	Position	Nationality	College
1	18	Vern Fleming	G	United States	Georgia
2	25	Devin Durrant	SF	United States	BYU
2	29	Stuart Gray	C/PF	United States	UCLA

== Roster ==
1984–85 Indiana Pacers roster
Players

Pos.	No.	Player	Height	Weight	DOB	From
SF	8	Tony Brown	6 ft 6 in (1.98 m)	185 lb (84 kg)		Arkansas
SF	7	Devin Durrant	6 ft 7 in (2.01 m)	200 lb (91 kg)		BYU
SF	25	Kenton Edelin	6 ft 8 in (2.03 m)	205 lb (93 kg)		Virginia
PG	10	Vern Fleming	6 ft 5 in (1.96 m)	185 lb (84 kg)		Georgia
PF	20	Bill Garnett (injured)	6 ft 9 in (2.06 m)	225 lb (102 kg)		Wyoming
C	55	Stuart Gray	7 ft 0 in (2.13 m)	235 lb (107 kg)		UCLA
PF	33	Clark Kellogg	6 ft 7 in (2.01 m)	225 lb (102 kg)		Ohio State
SF	11	Greg Kelser	6 ft 7 in (2.01 m)	190 lb (86 kg)		Michigan State
PG	14	Jerry Sichting	6 ft 1 in (1.85 m)	168 lb (76 kg)		Purdue
SG	43	Terence Stansbury	6 ft 5 in (1.96 m)	170 lb (77 kg)		Temple
C	40	Steve Stipanovich	6 ft 11 in (2.11 m)	245 lb (111 kg)		Missouri
SG	19	Jim Thomas	6 ft 3 in (1.91 m)	190 lb (86 kg)		Indiana
C	31	Granville Waiters	6 ft 11 in (2.11 m)	225 lb (102 kg)		Ohio State
C	32	Herb Williams	6 ft 10 in (2.08 m)	242 lb (110 kg)		Ohio State

Coaches
Head coach
- George Irvine
Assistant(s)
- Mel Daniels
- Donnie Walsh

Legend
- (DP) Unsigned draft pick
- (FA) Free agent
- (S) Suspended
- Injured

== Regular season ==
=== Season standings ===
Central Division	W	L	PCT	GB	Home	Road	Div
y-Milwaukee Bucks	59	23	.720	–	36–5	23–18	20–10
x-Detroit Pistons	46	36	.561	13	26–15	20–21	21–8
x-Chicago Bulls	38	44	.463	21	26–15	12–29	13–17
x-Cleveland Cavaliers	36	46	.439	23	20–21	16–25	13–16
Atlanta Hawks	34	48	.415	25	19–22	15–26	15–15
Indiana Pacers	22	60	.268	37	16–25	6–35	7–23

#	Eastern Conference				
#	Team	W	L	PCT	GB
1	z-Boston Celtics	63	19	.768	–
2	y-Milwaukee Bucks	59	23	.720	4
3	x-Philadelphia 76ers	58	24	.707	5
4	x-Detroit Pistons	46	36	.561	17
5	x-New Jersey Nets	42	40	.512	21
6	x-Washington Bullets	40	42	.488	23
7	x-Chicago Bulls	38	44	.463	25
8	x-Cleveland Cavaliers	36	46	.439	27
9	Atlanta Hawks	34	48	.415	29
10	New York Knicks	24	58	.293	39
11	Indiana Pacers	22	60	.268	41

z - clinched division title
y - clinched division title
x - clinched playoff spot

== Player statistics ==
=== Ragular season ===
Player	POS	GP	GS	MP	REB	AST	STL	BLK	PTS	MPG	RPG	APG	SPG	BPG	PPG
Steve Stipanovich	C	82	66	2,315	614	199	71	78	1,126	28.2	7.5	2.4	.9	1.0	13.7
Tony Brown	SF	82	26	1,586	288	159	59	12	544	19.3	3.5	1.9	.7	.1	6.6
Vern Fleming	PG	80	65	2,486	323	247	99	8	1,126	31.1	4.0	3.1	1.2	.1	14.1
Jim Thomas	SG	80	52	2,059	261	234	76	5	885	25.7	3.3	2.9	1.0	.1	11.1
Clark Kellogg	PF	77	65	2,449	724	244	86	26	1,432	31.8	9.4	3.2	1.1	.3	18.6
Herb Williams	C	75	70	2,557	634	252	54	134	1,375	34.1	8.5	3.4	.7	1.8	18.3
Terence Stansbury	SG	74	14	1,278	114	127	47	12	526	17.3	1.5	1.7	.6	.2	7.1
Jerry Sichting	PG	70	25	1,808	114	264	47	4	771	25.8	1.6	3.8	.7	.1	11.0
Bill Garnett	PF	65	13	1,123	286	67	28	15	418	17.3	4.4	1.0	.4	.2	6.4
Granville Waiters	C	62	5	703	170	30	16	44	199	11.3	2.7	.5	.3	.7	3.2
Devin Durrant	SF	59	8	756	124	80	19	10	300	12.8	2.1	1.4	.3	.2	5.1
Stuart Gray	C	52	0	391	123	15	9	14	102	7.5	2.4	.3	.2	.3	2.0
Kenton Edelin	SF	10	1	143	26	10	5	4	11	14.3	2.6	1.0	.5	.4	1.1
Greg Kelser	SF	10	0	114	19	13	7	0	62	11.4	1.9	1.3	.7	.0	6.2
Ralph Jackson	PG	1	0	12	1	4	2	0	2	12.0	1.0	4.0	2.0	.0	2.0

== See also ==
- 1984-85 NBA season
