= 1984–85 New York Knicks season =

Season of National Basketball Association team the New York Knicks

- Head coach: Hubie Brown
- President: Jack Krumpe
- General manager: Dave DeBusschere
- Owners: Gulf+Western
- Arena: Madison Square Garden

Results
- Record: 24–58 (.293)
- Place: Division: 5th (Atlantic); Conference: 10th (Eastern)
- Playoff finish: Did not qualify
- Stats at Basketball Reference

Local media
- Television: WOR-TV; MSG Network (Jim Karvellas, Butch Beard)
- Radio: WPAT/WGBB/WFAS (Marv Albert, John Andariese)

The 1984–85 New York Knicks season was the Knicks' 39th season in the NBA.

Bernard King injured his knee on March 25 and was put on injured reserve, ending his season. He was forced to sit out the next year. Before the injury, King scored 60 points in a Christmas Day game against the New Jersey Nets.

== Draft picks ==
Round	Pick	Player	Position	Nationality	College
3	64	Curtis Green		United States	Southern Mississippi
4	87	Bob Thornton	PF/C	United States	California-Irvine
6	133	Eddie Lee Wilkins	PF/C	United States	Gardner-Webb
7	156	Ken Bannister	F/C	United States	Saint Augustine's
8	179	Ricky Tunstall		United States	Youngstown State
9	201	Marc Marotta		United States	Marquette
10	223	Mike Henderson		United States	Long Island (C.W. Post Campus)

== Roster ==
New York Knicks roster
Players

Pos.	No.	Player	Height	Weight	DOB	From
PF	20	James Bailey	6 ft 9 in (2.06 m)	200 lb (91 kg)		Rutgers
PF	1	Ken Bannister	6 ft 9 in (2.06 m)	235 lb (107 kg)		St. Augustine's
SG	7	Butch Carter	6 ft 5 in (1.96 m)	180 lb (82 kg)		Indiana
C	25	Bill Cartwright	7 ft 1 in (2.16 m)	245 lb (111 kg)		San Francisco
C	8	Ron Cavenall	7 ft 1 in (2.16 m)	230 lb (104 kg)		Texas Southern
PF	42	Pat Cummings	6 ft 9 in (2.06 m)	230 lb (104 kg)		Cincinnati
SG	18	Ernie Grunfeld	6 ft 6 in (1.98 m)	210 lb (95 kg)		Tennessee
SF	30	Bernard King	6 ft 7 in (2.01 m)	197 lb (89 kg)		Tennessee
SF	55	Louis Orr	6 ft 8 in (2.03 m)	175 lb (79 kg)		Syracuse
PF	21	Truck Robinson	6 ft 7 in (2.01 m)	225 lb (102 kg)		Tennessee State
PG	2	Rory Sparrow	6 ft 2 in (1.88 m)	175 lb (79 kg)		Villanova
SG	6	Trent Tucker	6 ft 5 in (1.96 m)	193 lb (88 kg)		Minnesota
PG	4	Darrell Walker	6 ft 4 in (1.93 m)	180 lb (82 kg)		Arkansas
C	34	Eddie Lee Wilkins	6 ft 10 in (2.08 m)	220 lb (100 kg)		Gardner–Webb

Coaches
Head coach

Hubie Brown

Assistant(s)

Bob Hill

Legend
- (DP) Unsigned draft pick
- (FA) Free agent
- (S) Suspended
- Injured

== Regular season ==
=== Season standings ===
Atlantic Division	W	L	PCT	GB	Home	Road	Div
y-Boston Celtics	63	19	.768	–	35–6	28–13	19–5
x-Philadelphia 76ers	58	24	.707	5	34–7	24–17	15–9
x-New Jersey Nets	42	40	.512	21	27–14	15–26	13–11
x-Washington Bullets	40	42	.488	23	28–13	12–29	11–13
New York Knicks	24	58	.293	39	19–22	5–36	2–22

#	Eastern Conference				
#	Team	W	L	PCT	GB
1	z-Boston Celtics	63	19	.768	–
2	y-Milwaukee Bucks	59	23	.720	4
3	x-Philadelphia 76ers	58	24	.707	5
4	x-Detroit Pistons	46	36	.561	17
5	x-New Jersey Nets	42	40	.512	21
6	x-Washington Bullets	40	42	.488	23
7	x-Chicago Bulls	38	44	.463	25
8	x-Cleveland Cavaliers	36	46	.439	27
9	Atlanta Hawks	34	48	.415	29
10	New York Knicks	24	58	.293	39
11	Indiana Pacers	22	60	.268	41

z - clinched division title
y - clinched division title
x - clinched playoff spot

== Player statistics ==
Legend
GP	Games played	GS	Games started	MPG	Minutes per game
FG%	Field-goal percentage	3P%	3-point field-goal percentage	FT%	Free-throw percentage
RPG	Rebounds per game	APG	Assists per game	SPG	Steals per game
BPG	Blocks per game	PPG	Points per game

== See also ==
- 1984-85 NBA season
