= 1984–85 Atlanta Hawks season =

Season of National Basketball Association team the Atlanta Hawks

- Head coach: Mike Fratello (2nd Season)
- Arena: The Omni (29 games); Lakefront Arena (12 games)

Results
- Record: 34–48 (.415)
- Place: Division: 5th (Central); Conference: 9th (Eastern)
- Playoff finish: Did not qualify
- Stats at Basketball Reference

Local media
- Television: WVEU
- Radio: WSB

The 1984–85 NBA season was the Hawks' 36th season in the NBA and 17th season in Atlanta.

== Draft picks ==
Round	Pick	Player	Position	Nationality	College
1	11	Kevin Willis	PF/C	United States	Michigan State
3	58	Bobby Parks	G	United States	Memphis
4	81	Dickie Beal		United States	Kentucky
5	104	Terry Martin		United States	Louisiana-Monroe
6	127	Jim Master	SG	United States	Kentucky
7	150	Vince Martello		United States	Florida State
8	173	Robert Brown		United States	Long Island
9	195	Fred Brown		United States	Georgetown
10	217	Doug Mills		United States	Hofstra

== Roster ==
1984–85 Atlanta Hawks roster
Players

Pos.	No.	Player	Height	Weight	DOB	From
C	31	Rickey Brown	6 ft 10 in (2.08 m)	215 lb (98 kg)	August 20, 1958	Mississippi State
PF	33	Antoine Carr	6 ft 9 in (2.06 m)	225 lb (102 kg)	July 23, 1961	Wichita State
PG	14	Charlie Criss	5 ft 8 in (1.73 m)	165 lb (75 kg)	November 6, 1948	New Mexico State
PG	5	Jerry Eaves	6 ft 4 in (1.93 m)	180 lb (82 kg)	February 8, 1959	Louisville
SG	34	Mike Glenn	6 ft 2 in (1.88 m)	175 lb (79 kg)	September 10, 1955	Southern Illinois
PG	20	Stewart Granger	6 ft 3 in (1.91 m)	190 lb (86 kg)	October 27, 1961	Villanova
PF	44	Scott Hastings	6 ft 10 in (2.08 m)	235 lb (107 kg)	June 3, 1960	Arkansas
G	3	Eddie Johnson	6 ft 2 in (1.88 m)	180 lb (82 kg)	February 24, 1955	Auburn
PF	53	Cliff Levingston	6 ft 8 in (2.03 m)	210 lb (95 kg)	January 4, 1961	Wichita State
PG	43	Sidney Lowe	6 ft 0 in (1.83 m)	195 lb (88 kg)	January 21, 1960	NC State
SF	7	Leo Rautins	6 ft 8 in (2.03 m)	215 lb (98 kg)	March 20, 1960	Syracuse
PG	25	Doc Rivers	6 ft 4 in (1.93 m)	185 lb (84 kg)	October 13, 1961	Marquette
C	30	Tree Rollins	7 ft 1 in (2.16 m)	235 lb (107 kg)	June 16, 1955	Clemson
PG	2	Walker Russell	6 ft 5 in (1.96 m)	195 lb (88 kg)	October 26, 1960	Western Michigan
SF	21	Dominique Wilkins	6 ft 7 in (2.01 m)	200 lb (91 kg)	January 12, 1960	Georgia
SF	35	Sly Williams	6 ft 7 in (2.01 m)	210 lb (95 kg)	January 26, 1958	Rhode Island
PF	42	Kevin Willis	7 ft 0 in (2.13 m)	220 lb (100 kg)	September 6, 1962	Michigan State
SG	10	Randy Wittman	6 ft 6 in (1.98 m)	210 lb (95 kg)	October 28, 1959	Indiana

Coaches
Head coach
- Mike Fratello

Legend
- (DP) Unsigned draft pick
- (FA) Free agent
- (S) Suspended
- Injured

== Regular season ==
The Hawks played 12 of their 41 home games at New Orleans' Lakefront Arena.

=== Season standings ===
Central Division	W	L	PCT	GB	Home	Road	Div
y-Milwaukee Bucks	59	23	.720	–	36–5	23–18	20–10
x-Detroit Pistons	46	36	.561	13	26–15	20–21	21–8
x-Chicago Bulls	38	44	.463	21	26–15	12–29	13–17
x-Cleveland Cavaliers	36	46	.439	23	20–21	16–25	13–16
Atlanta Hawks	34	48	.415	25	19–22	15–26	15–15
Indiana Pacers	22	60	.268	37	16–25	6–35	7–23

#	Eastern Conference				
#	Team	W	L	PCT	GB
1	z-Boston Celtics	63	19	.768	–
2	y-Milwaukee Bucks	59	23	.720	4
3	x-Philadelphia 76ers	58	24	.707	5
4	x-Detroit Pistons	46	36	.561	17
5	x-New Jersey Nets	42	40	.512	21
6	x-Washington Bullets	40	42	.488	23
7	x-Chicago Bulls	38	44	.463	25
8	x-Cleveland Cavaliers	36	46	.439	27
9	Atlanta Hawks	34	48	.415	29
10	New York Knicks	24	58	.293	39
11	Indiana Pacers	22	60	.268	41

z - clinched division title
y - clinched division title
x - clinched playoff spot

=== Game log ===
1984–85 game log
Total: 34–48 (Home: 19–22; Road: 15–26)
October: 1–2 (home: 0–1; road: 1–1)

Game	Date	Team	Score	High points	High rebounds	High assists	Location Attendance	Record
2	October 27, 1984	Philadelphia	L 108–111				The Omni	1–1

November: 6–8 (home: 5–4; road: 1–4)

Game	Date	Team	Score	High points	High rebounds	High assists	Location Attendance	Record
4	November 1, 1984	Detroit						
6	November 7, 1984	@ Milwaukee						
9	November 13, 1984	Milwaukee						
12	November 21, 1984	Utah (at New Orleans, LA)						
16	November 28, 1984	Milwaukee (at New Orleans, LA)						

December: 6–9 (home: 4–3; road: 2–6)

Game	Date	Team	Score	High points	High rebounds	High assists	Location Attendance	Record
21	December 9, 1984	@ Boston	L 127–128				Boston Garden	8–13
25	December 15, 1984	Boston	L 94–101				The Omni	10–15
26	December 18, 1984; 7:30 p.m. EST	L.A. Lakers	L 116–117	Rivers (25)	Levingston (10)	Johnson (17)	The Omni; 9,844	10–16

January: 6–7 (home: 5–2; road: 1–5)

Game	Date	Team	Score	High points	High rebounds	High assists	Location Attendance	Record
34	January 4, 1985	@ Detroit						
37	January 12, 1985	Boston	L 111–119				The Omni	15–22
39	January 16, 1985	@ Philadelphia	L 99–122				The Spectrum	16–23
42	January 22, 1985	Detroit (at New Orleans, LA)						

February: 5–8 (home: 2–3; road: 3–5)

Game	Date	Team	Score	High points	High rebounds	High assists	Location Attendance	Record
47	February 2, 1985	@ Detroit						
48	February 4, 1985	@ Philadelphia	L 92–106				The Spectrum	20–28
50	February 7, 1985	@ Milwaukee						
All-Star Break
51	February 12, 1985	@ Denver	L 107–131				McNichols Sports Arena	21–30
52	February 13, 1985	@ Utah						
53	February 15, 1985; 10:30 p.m. EST	@ L.A. Lakers	L 111–120	Johnson (29)	Levingston, Wilkins (9)	Johnson (13)	The Forum; 13,852	22–31
57	February 26, 1985	Denver	L 94–106				The Omni	24–33

March: 5–11 (home: 1–7; road: 4–4)

Game	Date	Team	Score	High points	High rebounds	High assists	Location Attendance	Record
59	March 1, 1985	@ Boston	W 114–105				Boston Garden	25–34
61	March 5, 1985	Portland						
62	March 6, 1985	@ Philadelphia	L 86–96				The Spectrum	25–37
63	March 9, 1985	Detroit						
64	March 11, 1985	Milwaukee						
65	March 12, 1985	Boston (at New Orleans, LA)	L 115–126				Lakefront Arena	25–40
68	March 17, 1985	@ Portland						
74	March 30, 1985	@ Milwaukee						

April: 5–3 (home: 2–2; road: 3–1)

Game	Date	Team	Score	High points	High rebounds	High assists	Location Attendance	Record
75	April 1, 1985	@ Detroit						
76	April 2, 1985	Philadelphia	L 91–102				The Omni	30–46

1984–85 schedule

== Player statistics ==
Legend
GP	Games played	GS	Games started	MPG	Minutes per game
FG%	Field-goal percentage	3P%	3-point field-goal percentage	FT%	Free-throw percentage
RPG	Rebounds per game	APG	Assists per game	SPG	Steals per game
BPG	Blocks per game	PPG	Points per game

Player	GP	GS	MPG	FG%	3FG%	FT%	RPG	APG	SPG	BPG	PPG
Dominique Wilkins	81	81	37.3	45.1	30.9	80.6	6.9	2.5	1.7	0.7	27.4
Eddie Johnson	73	66	32.4	47.9	30.6	79.8	2.6	7.8	0.6	0.1	16.3
Doc Rivers	69	58	30.8	47.6	41.7	77.0	3.1	5.9	2.4	0.8	14.1
Sly Williams	34	20	25.5	43.9	26.7	64.2	4.9	2.8	0.8	0.2	12.3
Randy Wittman	41	22	28.5	53.1	28.6	73.2	1.8	3.0	0.7	0.2	9.9
Cliff Levingston	74	53	27.3	52.7	0.0	65.3	7.6	1.4	0.9	0.9	9.8
Kevin Willis	82	19	21.8	46.7	22.2	65.7	6.4	0.4	0.4	0.6	9.3
Mike Glenn	60	5	18.8	58.8	0.0	81.6	1.4	2.0	0.5	0.0	8.6
Antoine Carr	62	15	19.3	52.8	33.3	78.9	3.7	1.3	0.5	1.3	8.0
Tree Rollins	70	60	25.0	54.9	0.0	72.0	6.3	0.7	0.5	2.4	6.3
Charlie Criss	4	2	28.8	41.2	0.0	66.7	3.5	5.5	0.8	0.0	4.5
Walker Russell	21	2	18.0	54.0	100.0	82.4	1.9	3.1	0.8	0.2	4.0
Scott Hastings	64	1	12.9	47.3	0.0	77.8	2.5	0.7	0.4	0.4	3.8
Jerry Eaves	3	0	12.3	50.0	0.0	83.3	0.0	1.3	0.0	0.0	3.7
Rickey Brown	69	5	11.8	40.6	0.0	57.4	3.2	0.4	0.3	0.3	2.8
Stewart Granger	9	1	10.2	35.3	0.0	50.0	0.7	1.3	0.2	0.0	1.8
Sidney Lowe	15	0	10.6	40.0	0.0	100.0	1.0	2.8	0.7	0.0	1.6
Leo Rautins	4	0	3.0	0.0	0.0	0.0	0.5	0.8	0.0	0.0	0.0

Player statistics citation:

== See also ==
- 1984-85 NBA season
