= Poquette =

Poquette is a surname. Notable people with the surname include:

- Ben Poquette (born 1955), American basketball player
- Tom Poquette (born 1951), American baseball player
