= Edgar Jones (basketball) =

American basketball player

Personal information
- Born: June 17, 1956 (age 70) Fort Rucker, Alabama, U.S.
- Listed height: 6 ft 10 in (2.08 m)
- Listed weight: 225 lb (102 kg)

Career information
- High school: Barringer (Newark, New Jersey)
- College: Nevada (1975–1979)
- NBA draft: 1979: 2nd round, 31st overall pick
- Drafted by: Milwaukee Bucks
- Playing career: 1979–1995
- Position: Power forward / center
- Number: 42, 44

Career history
- 1979–1980: Lehigh Valley Jets
- 1980–1981: New Jersey Nets
- 1981–1983: Detroit Pistons
- 1983–1984: San Antonio Spurs
- 1984–1986: Cleveland Cavaliers
- 1988–1990: Panathinaikos
- 1990: Peñas Huesca
- 1991–1992: Aris
- 1994–1995: Yakima Sun Kings

Career highlights
- Greek Cup winner (1992); Greek League All-Star (1991); CBA champion (1995); All-CBA First Team (1980); CBA Rookie of the Year (1980); No. 32 retired by Nevada Wolf Pack

Career NBA statistics
- Points: 3,257 (9.0 ppg)
- Rebounds: 1,745 (4.8 rpg)
- Blocks: 455 (1.3 bpg)
- Stats at NBA.com
- Stats at Basketball Reference

Edgar Jones (born June 17, 1956) is an American former professional basketball player, who had a career in the National Basketball Association (NBA), from 1980 to 1986.

== College career ==
In his sophomore year of college basketball, with the University of Nevada, Reno, Jones led the school to a 15–12 record, the Nevada Wolf Packs first winning season in eight seasons. During his time playing for the Wolf Pack (1975–79), Jones set the school's all-time total points scored record with 1,877 points; a record which stood until broken by the Wolf Pack's Nick Fazekas, on November 18, 2006. Jones' jersey number 32 was officially retired by the University of Nevada, upon his retirement. He was the first Wolf Pack player to be given that honor.

== Professional career ==
After his graduation from college, Jones was drafted in the second round, with the 31st overall pick of the 1979 NBA draft, by the Milwaukee Bucks. During his NBA career, he played for teams such as the San Antonio Spurs and the Cleveland Cavaliers. Jones also participated in the 1984 Slam Dunk Contest, in Denver.

Jones played for the Lehigh Valley Jets of the Continental Basketball Association (CBA) during the 1979–80 season. He was selected as the CBA Rookie of the Year and named to the All-CBA First Team.

Jones also played professionally in the Greek Basket League. He played with the Greek club Panathinaikos Athens, from 1988 to 1990. He also played with the Greek club Aris Thessaloniki, in the 1991–92 season. With Aris, he won the Greek Cup title in 1992.

== Career statistics ==
Legend
GP	Games played	GS	Games started	MPG	Minutes per game
FG%	Field goal percentage	3P%	3-point field goal percentage	FT%	Free throw percentage
RPG	Rebounds per game	APG	Assists per game	SPG	Steals per game
BPG	Blocks per game	PPG	Points per game	**Bold**	Career high

=== NBA ===
==== Regular season ====
Year	Team	GP	GS	MPG	FG%	3P%	FT%	RPG	APG	SPG	BPG	PPG
1980–81	New Jersey	60		15.8	.529	.000	.670	4.4	.7	.6	1.4	8.7
1981–82	Detroit	48	19	16.7	**.548**	**.500**	.698	4.3	.8	.6	**1.9**	7.8
1982–83	Detroit	49	25	21.1	.493	.333	.680	5.5	**1.4**	.6	1.6	8.3
1982–83	San Antonio	28	3	**22.2**	.497	.000	.737	**6.3**	.7	.5	1.1	9.1
1983–84	San Antonio	**81**	**33**	21.9	.500	.316	.727	5.5	1.0	**.8**	1.3	**10.2**
1984–85	San Antonio	18	1	17.9	.484	.000	**.804**	3.4	1.0	.5	1.0	7.2
1984–85	Cleveland	26	4	17.2	.467	.000	.683	4.2	.4	.4	.4	8.2
1985–86	Cleveland	53	6	19.1	.505	.304	.742	3.9	.8	.6	.7	9.7
Career		363	91	19.2	.506	.262	.710	4.8	.9	.6	1.3	9.0

==== Playoffs ====
Year	Team	GP	GS	MPG	FG%	3P%	FT%	RPG	APG	SPG	BPG	PPG
1983	San Antonio	**11**		**17.5**	.452	.000	.576	**4.8**	**1.5**	**.5**	**1.3**	**6.8**
1985	Cleveland	4	0	11.3	**.500**	.000	**.875**	2.0	.8	**.5**	.0	6.3
Career		15	0	15.9	.463	.000	.634	4.1	1.3	.5	.9	6.7

== See also ==
- List of National Basketball Association players with most blocks in a game
