= Paul Thompson (basketball) =

American basketball player,

Personal information
- Born: May 25, 1961 (age 65) Smyrna, Tennessee, U.S.
- Listed height: 6 ft 6 in (1.98 m)
- Listed weight: 210 lb (95 kg)

Career information
- High school: Peabody (Alexandria, Louisiana)
- College: Tulane (1979–1983)
- NBA draft: 1983: 3rd round, 50th overall pick
- Drafted by: Cleveland Cavaliers
- Playing career: 1983–1999
- Position: Shooting guard / small forward
- Number: 33, 6, 36

Career history
- 1983–1985: Cleveland Cavaliers
- 1985: Milwaukee Bucks
- 1985: Philadelphia 76ers
- 1985–1986: La Crosse Catbirds
- 1986–1987: Limoges
- 1987–1989: Nashua Den Bosch
- 1989–1990: FC Barcelona
- 1990–1992: B. Sardegna Sassari
- 1992–1995: Bnei HaSharon
- 1996–1998: Maccabi Ra'anana
- 1998–1999: Ironi Ramat Gan

Career highlights
- 2× First-team All-Metro Conference (1981, 1983); Second-team All-Metro Conference (1982); Metro Conference Freshman of the Year (1980)
- Stats at NBA.com
- Stats at Basketball Reference

Paul Stanford Thompson (born May 25, 1961) is an American former professional basketball player who played in the National Basketball Association (NBA). He was drafted in the third round of the 1983 NBA draft by the Cleveland Cavaliers. In 1985, Thompson was traded to the Milwaukee Bucks for two draft picks. Later in the year, he signed with the Philadelphia 76ers after being waived by the Bucks.

== Career statistics ==
Legend
GP	Games played	GS	Games started	MPG	Minutes per game
FG%	Field goal percentage	3P%	3-point field goal percentage	FT%	Free throw percentage
RPG	Rebounds per game	APG	Assists per game	SPG	Steals per game
BPG	Blocks per game	PPG	Points per game	**Bold**	Career high
*	Led the league

=== NBA ===
==== Regular season ====
Year	Team	GP	GS	MPG	FG%	3P%	FT%	RPG	APG	SPG	BPG	PPG
1983–84	Cleveland	**82***	10	21.1	**.467**	.231	.772	**3.8**	1.5	0.9	0.5	9.0
1984–85	Cleveland	33	**27**	**21.7**	.418	**.261**	.849	3.5	**1.8**	**1.2**	0.6	**10.5**
1984–85	Milwaukee	16	0	14.2	.390	.000	.706	2.6	1.3	0.9	0.3	6.6
1985–86	Philadelphia	23	8	18.8	.361	.167	**.860**	2.7	1.0	0.7	**0.7**	7.8
Career		154	45	20.2	.432	.210	.792	3.5	1.5	0.9	0.5	8.9

==== Playoffs ====
Year	Team	GP	GS	MPG	FG%	3P%	FT%	RPG	APG	SPG	BPG	PPG
1984–85	Milwaukee	3	0	11.3	.417	.000	.600	1.7	0.7	1.3	0.3	4.3

=== College ===
Year	Team	GP	GS	MPG	FG%	3P%	FT%	RPG	APG	SPG	BPG	PPG
1979–80	Tulane	26	-	31.2	.462	-	.700	8.2	1.3	**1.6**	0.9	15.0
1980–81	Tulane	27	26	35.7	.447	-	**.805**	**9.4**	**1.9**	1.2	**1.3**	**18.7**
1981–82	Tulane	28	27	34.0	.493	-	.782	7.4	1.8	0.9	0.5	14.7
1982–83	Tulane	**31**	**29**	**36.4**	**.508**	-	.795	7.4	**1.9**	1.3	0.7	17.5
Career		112	82	34.4	.477	-	.776	8.1	1.7	1.2	0.8	16.5
