= 1984–85 Cleveland Cavaliers season =

NBA professional basketball team season

- Head coach: George Karl
- General manager: Harry Weltman
- Owners: Gordon Gund; George Gund III
- Arena: Richfield Coliseum

Results
- Record: 36–46 (.439)
- Place: Division: 4th (Central); Conference: 8th (Eastern)
- Playoff finish: First round (lost to Celtics 1–3)
- Stats at Basketball Reference

Local media
- Television: WUAB
- Radio: WWWE

The 1984–85 Cleveland Cavaliers season was the 15th NBA basketball season in Cleveland, Ohio.

== Draft picks ==
Round	Pick	Player	Position	Nationality	School/Club team
1	12	Tim McCormick	C	United States	Michigan
2	27	Ron Anderson	SF	United States	Fresno State
3	50	Ben McDonald		United States	California-Irvine
3	60	Leonard Mitchell		United States	Louisiana State
4	73	Art Aaron		United States	Northwestern
5	96	Vince Hichen		United States	Boise State
6	119	Matt Doherty		United States	North Carolina
7	142	Joe Jakubick		United States	Akron
8	165	Elliot Beard		United States	Oberlin
9	187	John Shimko		United States	Xavier
10	209	Darrell Space		United States	Northeastern Illinois

== Roster ==
1984–85 Cleveland Cavaliers roster
Players

Pos.	No.	Player	Height	Weight	DOB	From
SF	25	Ron Anderson	6 ft 7 in (2.01 m)	215 lb (98 kg)	1958-10-15	Fresno State
PG	5	John Bagley	6 ft 0 in (1.83 m)	185 lb (84 kg)	1960-04-23	Boston College
PG	16	Johnny Davis	6 ft 2 in (1.88 m)	170 lb (77 kg)	1955-10-21	Dayton
SG	21	World B. Free	6 ft 2 in (1.88 m)	185 lb (84 kg)	1953-12-09	Guilford
PF	32	Roy Hinson	6 ft 9 in (2.06 m)	210 lb (95 kg)	1961-05-02	Rutgers
SF	35	Phil Hubbard	6 ft 8 in (2.03 m)	215 lb (98 kg)	1956-12-13	Michigan
PF	42	Edgar Jones	6 ft 10 in (2.08 m)	225 lb (102 kg)	1956-06-17	Nevada
PF	50	Ben Poquette	6 ft 9 in (2.06 m)	235 lb (107 kg)	1955-05-07	Central Michigan
PF	8	Lonnie Shelton	6 ft 8 in (2.03 m)	240 lb (109 kg)	1955-10-19	Oregon State
C	54	Melvin Turpin	6 ft 11 in (2.11 m)	240 lb (109 kg)	1960-12-28	Kentucky
C	41	Mark West	6 ft 10 in (2.08 m)	230 lb (104 kg)	1960-11-05	Old Dominion
SG	12	Kevin Williams	6 ft 2 in (1.88 m)	175 lb (79 kg)	1961-09-11	St. John's

Coaches
Head coach
- George Karl
Assistant(s)
- Gene Littles
- Morris McHone

Legend
- (DP) Unsigned draft pick
- (FA) Free agent
- (S) Suspended
- Injured

Roster
Updated: February 12, 1985

== Regular season ==
=== Season standings ===
Central Division	W	L	PCT	GB	Home	Road	Div
y-Milwaukee Bucks	59	23	.720	–	36–5	23–18	20–10
x-Detroit Pistons	46	36	.561	13	26–15	20–21	21–8
x-Chicago Bulls	38	44	.463	21	26–15	12–29	13–17
x-Cleveland Cavaliers	36	46	.439	23	20–21	16–25	13–16
Atlanta Hawks	34	48	.415	25	19–22	15–26	15–15
Indiana Pacers	22	60	.268	37	16–25	6–35	7–23

#	Eastern Conference				
#	Team	W	L	PCT	GB
1	z-Boston Celtics	63	19	.768	–
2	y-Milwaukee Bucks	59	23	.720	4
3	x-Philadelphia 76ers	58	24	.707	5
4	x-Detroit Pistons	46	36	.561	17
5	x-New Jersey Nets	42	40	.512	21
6	x-Washington Bullets	40	42	.488	23
7	x-Chicago Bulls	38	44	.463	25
8	x-Cleveland Cavaliers	36	46	.439	27
9	Atlanta Hawks	34	48	.415	29
10	New York Knicks	24	58	.293	39
11	Indiana Pacers	22	60	.268	41

Notes

- z, y – division champions
- x – clinched playoff spot

== Game log ==
1984–85 game log
Total: 36–46 (home: 20–21; road: 16–25)
October: 0–3 (home: 0–1; road: 0–2)

Game	Date	Team	Score	High points	High rebounds	High assists	Location Attendance	Record
1	October 26, 1984	@ Philadelphia	L 101–111				The Spectrum	0–1
2	October 27, 1984	New Jersey	L 106–131				Richfield Coliseum	0–2
3	October 30, 1984	@ Detroit	L 107–124				Pontiac Silverdome	0–3

November: 2–10 (home: 1–5; road: 1–5)

Game	Date	Team	Score	High points	High rebounds	High assists	Location Attendance	Record
4	November 2, 1984	Indiana	L 109–116				Richfield Coliseum	0–4
5	November 3, 1984	@ Milwaukee	L 88–117				MECCA Arena	0–5
6	November 5, 1984	Detroit	L 98–107				Richfield Coliseum	0–6
7	November 8, 1984	@ Phoenix	L 111–112				Arizona Veterans Memorial Coliseum	0–7
8	November 10, 1984	@ San Antonio	L 103–127				HemisFair Arena	0–8
9	November 13, 1984	@ Houston	L 98–106				The Summit	0–9
10	November 15, 1984; 7:30 p.m. EST	@ Atlanta	W 102–99	Free (18)		Bagley (9)	The Omni; 3,836	1–9
11	November 17, 1984	@ New York	L 88–112				Madison Square Garden	1–10
12	November 21, 1984	New York	L 101–109				Richfield Coliseum	1–11
13	November 23, 1984	Golden State	L 106–107				Richfield Coliseum	1–12
14	November 25, 1984; 8:00 p.m. EST	Atlanta	W 118–111	Davis (20)		Bagley (13)	Richfield Coliseum; 3,630	2–12
15	November 27, 1984	Portland	L 106–115				Richfield Coliseum	2–13

December: 4–9 (home: 3–5; road: 1–4)

Game	Date	Team	Score	High points	High rebounds	High assists	Location Attendance	Record
16	December 1, 1984	Boston	L 104–110				Richfield Coliseum	2–14
17	December 2, 1984	@ Boston	L 99–122				Boston Garden	2–15
18	December 4, 1984; 7:30 p.m. EST	L.A. Lakers	L 112–116	Hubbard (37)	Hubbard (8)	Davis (10)	Richfield Coliseum; 11,298	2–16
19	December 8, 1984	Denver	L 108–114				Richfield Coliseum	2–17
20	December 11, 1984	Milwaukee	L 106–120				Richfield Coliseum	2–18
21	December 12, 1984; 8:30 pm EST	@ Atlanta (at New Orleans, LA)	L 99–116	Thompson (23)		Davis, Thompson, Wilson (4)	Lakefront Arena; 3,082	2–19
22	December 15, 1984	New York	W 102–97				Richfield Coliseum	3–19
23	December 18, 1984	San Antonio	W 118–110				Richfield Coliseum	4–19
24	December 20, 1984	@ New York	L 97–112				Madison Square Garden	4–20
25	December 22, 1984	@ Indiana	W 106–103				Market Square Arena	5–20
26	December 25, 1984; 7:30 p.m. EST	Atlanta	W 109–106	Hubbard (28)		Davis, Free (7)	Richfield Coliseum; 4,216	6–20
27	December 27, 1984	@ Chicago	L 108–112				Chicago Stadium	6–21
28	December 29, 1984	Milwaukee	L 102–115				Richfield Coliseum	6–22

January: 7–9 (home: 5–3; road: 2–6)

Game	Date	Team	Score	High points	High rebounds	High assists	Location Attendance	Record
29	January 2, 1985	@ Detroit	L 100–108				Pontiac Silverdome	6–23
30	January 3, 1985	Washington	W 100–93				Richfield Coliseum	7–23
31	January 5, 1985	Phoenix	W 111–106				Richfield Coliseum	8–23
32	January 8, 1985	New Jersey	W 107–101				Richfield Coliseum	9–23
33	January 11, 1985	@ Milwaukee	L 117–130				MECCA Arena	9–24
34	January 12, 1985	Chicago	W 101–98				Richfield Coliseum	10–24
35	January 14, 1985	Washington	L 91–101				Richfield Coliseum	10–25
36	January 15, 1985	@ Kansas City	W 116–112				Kemper Arena	11–25
37	January 17, 1985	@ Chicago	L 93–98				Chicago Stadium	11–26
38	January 19, 1985	Seattle	L 105–106				Richfield Coliseum	11–27
39	January 21, 1985	@ Washington	L 115–128				Capital Centre	11–28
40	January 22, 1985	Philadelphia	L 100–101				Richfield Coliseum	11–29
41	January 24, 1985	@ Utah	WL 110–109				Salt Palace Acord Arennea	12–29
42	January 26, 1985	@ Denver	L 127–144				McNichols Sports Arena	12–30
43	January 29, 1985	L.A. Clippers	W 110–94				Richfield Coliseum	13–30
44	January 30, 1985	@ Indiana	L 115–120				Market Square Arena	13–31

February: 9–6 (home: 4–3; road: 5–3)

Game	Date	Team	Score	High points	High rebounds	High assists	Location Attendance	Record
45	February 1, 1985; 7:30 p.m EST	@ Atlanta	L 108–126	Free (27)		Bagley (9)	The Omni; 15,908	13–32
46	February 2, 1985	Kansas City	W 124–106				Richfield Coliseum	14–32
47	February 4, 1985	@ Washington	W 121–112				Capital Centre	15–32
48	February 6, 1985	@ Boston	L 108–113				Boston Garden	15–33
49	February 7, 1985	Chicago	W 108–99				Richfield Coliseum	16–33
All-Star Break
50	February 12, 1985	Dallas	L 1128–131				Richfield Coliseum	16–34
51	February 13, 1985	@ New Jersey	L 105–112				Brendan Byrne Arena	16–35
52	February 15, 1985	@ Philadelphia	W 112–107				The Spectrum	17–35
53	February 16, 1985	Houston	L 115–122				Richfield Coliseum	17–36
54	February 18, 1985	Philadelphia	W 120–113				Richfield Coliseum	18–36
55	February 20, 1985	@ Indiana	W 102–92				Market Square Arena	19–36
56	February 22, 1985	Utah	L 98–102				Richfield Coliseum	19–37
57	February 23, 1985	Milwaukee	W 128–106				Richfield Coliseum	20–37
58	February 26, 1985	@ Chicago	W 123–118 (OT)				Chicago Stadium	21–37
59	February 28, 1985	@ Seattle	W 120–95				Kingdome	22–37

March: 9–6 (home: 5–2; road: 4–4)

Game	Date	Team	Score	High points	High rebounds	High assists	Location Attendance	Record
60	March 1, 1985	@ Portland	W 111–103				Memorial Coliseum	23–37
61	March 4, 1985	@ Golden State	W 108–104				Oakland-Alameda County Coliseum Arena	24–37
62	March 6, 1985	@ L.A. Clippers	W 114–112				Los Angeles Memorial Sports Arena	25–37
63	March 9, 1985; 11:00 p.m. EST	@ L.A. Lakers	L 106–133	Hinson, Turpin (18)	Turpin (11)	Bagley (6)	The Forum; 17,505	25–38
64	March 11, 1985	Indiana	W 122–110				Richfield Coliseum	26–38
65	March 13, 1985	@ Milwaukee	L 93–128				MECCA Arena	26–39
66	March 15, 1985	Boston	L 96–119				Richfield Coliseum	26–40
67	March 16, 1985	@ Dallas	W 135–128 (OT)				Reunion Arena	27–40
68	March 19, 1985	Philadelphia	W 116–89				Richfield Coliseum	28–40
69	March 20, 1985	@ New Jersey	L 108–128				Brendan Byrne Arena	28–41
70	March 22, 1985	@ Boston	L 117–129				Boston Garden	28–42
71	March 23, 1985; 8:00 p.m. EST	Atlanta	L 86–91 (OT)	Free (17)		Free (9)	Richfield Coliseum; 16,787	28–43
72	March 26, 1985	New York	W 112–98				Richfield Coliseum	29–43
73	March 28, 1985	Chicago	W 122–1140				Richfield Coliseum	30–43
74	March 30, 1985	Indiana	W 117–94				Richfield Coliseum	31–43

April: 5–3 (home: 2–2; road: 3–1)

Game	Date	Team	Score	High points	High rebounds	High assists	Location Attendance	Record
75	April 2, 1985	Washington	W 122–107				Richfield Coliseum	32–43
76	April 3, 1985	@ Philadelphia	W 113–110				The Spectrum	33–43
77	April 5, 1985	@ Detroit	W 119–118				Joe Louis Arena	34–43
78	April 6, 1985	@ Washington	L 101–109				Capital Centre	34–44
79	April 9, 1985	New Jersey	W 114–100				Richfield Coliseum	35–44
80	April 11, 1985	Boston	L 115–121				Richfield Coliseum	35–45
81	April 12, 1985	@ New York	W 109–108 (OT)				Madison Square Garden	36–45
82	April 14, 1985	Detroit	L 113–116				Richfield Coliseum	36–46

1984–85 schedule

== Playoffs ==
1985 playoff game log
First round: 1–3 (home: 1–1; road: 0–2)

Game	Date	Team	Score	High points	High rebounds	High assists	Location Attendance	Series
1	April 18, 1985	@ Boston	L 123–126	Hinson (24)	Hinson (11)	Bagley (11)	Boston Garden; 14,890	0–1
2	April 20, 1985	@ Boston	L 106–108	Free (25)	Hinson (6)	Free (7)	Boston Garden; 14,890	0–2
3	April 23, 1985	Boston	W 105–98	Free (32)	Hinson (9)	Bagley (15)	Richfield Coliseum; 20,900	1–2
4	April 25, 1985	Boston	L 115–117	Free (30)	Shelton (8)	Bagley (10)	Richfield Coliseum; 20,900	1–3

1985 schedule

== Player stats ==
Legend
GP	Games played	GS	Games started	MPG	Minutes per game
FG%	Field-goal percentage	3P%	3-point field-goal percentage	FT%	Free-throw percentage
RPG	Rebounds per game	APG	Assists per game	SPG	Steals per game
BPG	Blocks per game	PPG	Points per game

=== Regular season ===
Player	GP	GS	MPG	FG%	3FG%	FT%	RPG	APG	SPG	BPG	PPG
World B. Free	71	50	31.7	45.9	36.8	74.9	3.0	4.5	1.1	0.2	22.5
Roy Hinson	76	75	30.8	50.3	0.0	72.1	7.8	0.9	0.7	2.3	15.8
Phil Hubbard	76	55	29.6	50.5	0.0	75.1	6.3	1.5	1.1	0.1	15.8
Johnny Davis	76	30	25.3	42.6	26.1	85.0	1.6	5.6	0.6	0.1	12.4
Melvin Turpin	79	45	24.7	51.1	0.0	78.4	5.7	0.5	0.5	1.1	10.6
Paul Thompson	33	27	21.7	41.8	26.1	84.9	3.5	1.8	1.2	0.6	10.5
John Bagley	81	65	29.6	48.8	11.5	74.9	3.6	8.6	1.6	0.1	9.9
Edgar Jones	26	4	17.2	46.7	0.0	68.3	4.2	0.4	0.4	0.4	8.2
Michael Wilson	11	0	15.9	50.0	0.0	76.7	1.6	2.2	0.9	0.3	7.0
Ben Poquette	79	6	21.0	46.0	17.6	79.6	6.0	1.0	0.6	0.7	6.7
Lonnie Shelton	57	14	21.8	43.5	0.0	66.2	4.7	1.7	0.8	0.3	6.4
Jeff Cook	18	3	24.4	43.8	0.0	63.0	5.8	1.3	0.3	0.5	6.1
Ron Anderson	36	7	14.4	43.1	50.0	82.0	2.4	0.9	0.3	0.2	5.8
Mark West	65	25	13.6	54.9	0.0	48.2	3.8	0.2	0.2	0.7	3.9
Kevin Williams	46	4	9.0	43.3	0.0	73.4	1.4	1.3	0.5	0.1	3.5
Geoff Huston	8	0	11.6	48.0	0.0	66.7	0.1	2.9	0.0	0.0	3.3
Robert Smith	7	0	6.9	23.5	0.0	80.0	0.6	1.0	0.3	0.0	2.3
Campy Russell	3	0	8.0	28.6	0.0	66.7	1.7	1.0	0.0	0.0	2.0
Butch Graves	4	0	2.8	33.3	0.0	20.0	0.5	0.3	0.3	0.0	1.3

=== Playoffs ===
Player	GP	GS	MPG	FG%	3FG%	FT%	RPG	APG	SPG	BPG	PPG
World B. Free	4	4	37.5	44.1	0.0	92.0	2.5	7.8	1.5	0.0	26.3
Roy Hinson	4	4	30.0	54.2	0.0	65.2	7.5	0.8	0.8	2.3	16.8
Phil Hubbard	4	4	25.3	53.3	100.0	76.5	5.0	0.8	0.8	0.0	15.5
John Bagley	4	4	42.0	39.3	0.0	70.0	4.0	10.0	2.5	0.0	12.8
Lonnie Shelton	4	0	26.5	55.9	0.0	80.0	5.5	1.0	0.5	0.3	11.5
Johnny Davis	3	0	16.7	75.0	0.0	80.0	2.0	5.0	1.7	0.0	9.3
Ben Poquette	4	0	22.8	61.9	0.0	80.0	3.5	0.3	0.5	1.5	7.5
Edgar Jones	4	0	11.3	50.0	0.0	87.5	2.0	0.8	0.5	0.0	6.3
Melvin Turpin	4	0	11.3	63.2	0.0	50.0	2.0	0.0	1.0	0.3	6.3
Mark West	4	4	17.0	60.0	0.0	40.0	4.5	1.0	0.5	0.0	2.0
Kevin Williams	2	0	3.5	50.0	0.0	0.0	0.0	0.5	0.0	0.0	1.0
Ron Anderson	2	0	4.5	0.0	0.0	0.0	1.5	0.0	0.0	0.0	0.0

Player statistics citation:
