= Ben Poquette =

American basketball player

Personal information
- Born: May 7, 1955 (age 71) Ann Arbor, Michigan, U.S.
- Listed height: 6 ft 9 in (2.06 m)
- Listed weight: 235 lb (107 kg)

Career information
- High school: East Lansing (East Lansing, Michigan)
- College: Central Michigan (1973–1977)
- NBA draft: 1977: 2nd round, 36th overall pick
- Drafted by: Detroit Pistons
- Playing career: 1977–1990
- Position: Power forward
- Number: 50

Career history
- 1977–1979: Detroit Pistons
- 1979–1983: Utah Jazz
- 1983–1987: Cleveland Cavaliers
- 1987: Chicago Bulls
- 1987–1989: Irge Desio
- 1989–1990: S. Bennedetto Gorizia

Career highlights
- First-team All-MAC (1977); No. 50 retired by Central Michigan Chippewas

Career NBA statistics
- Points: 4,899 (6.8 ppg)
- Rebounds: 3,371 (5.2 rpg)
- Blocks: 794 (1.1 bpg)
- Stats at NBA.com
- Stats at Basketball Reference

Benedict Jay Poquette (born May 7, 1955) is an American former basketball player in the National Basketball Association (NBA). Born in Ann Arbor, Michigan, he graduated from East Lansing High School and Central Michigan University. He was drafted by the Detroit Pistons in the second round (36th pick overall) of the 1977 NBA draft, and played for them from 1978–79. He also played for the Utah Jazz in 1980–83, the Cleveland Cavaliers in 1984–87, and the Chicago Bulls in 1987 (his last season in the NBA).

His best seasons in the league occurred while playing for the Utah Jazz. The Jazz franchise had just arrived in Salt Lake City in 1979 after five mostly unsuccessful seasons in New Orleans. The team was thin up front, having traded away top big men Rich Kelley, Spencer Haywood, Joe C. Meriweather, and Truck Robinson in the previous two seasons. Despite being relatively undersized at 6'9" and 235 pounds, Poquette was tasked with replacing the 7'0" Kelley at center. Poquette posted modest averages of 9.0 points and 6.6 rebounds per game in his four seasons with Jazz, but excelled at shot-blocking, setting franchise records for most blocks in a career (517 in 321 games) and single season (174 in 1980–81). Notably, Poquette also had the somewhat dubious distinction of leading the NBA in personal fouls during that 1980–81 season, with 342 total fouls committed.

== Career statistics ==
Legend
GP	Games played	GS	Games started	MPG	Minutes per game
FG%	Field goal percentage	3P%	3-point field goal percentage	FT%	Free throw percentage
RPG	Rebounds per game	APG	Assists per game	SPG	Steals per game
BPG	Blocks per game	PPG	Points per game	**Bold**	Career high

=== NBA ===
==== Regular season ====
Year	Team	GP	GS	MPG	FG%	3P%	FT%	RPG	APG	SPG	BPG	PPG
1977–78	Detroit	52		12.0	.422		.700	2.8	.4	.2	.4	4.5
1978–79	Detroit	76		17.6	.427		.782	4.4	.8	.5	1.3	6.7
1979–80	Utah	**82**		28.6	.523	.000	**.832**	6.8	1.6	.5	2.0	8.9
1980–81	Utah	**82**	**82**	**34.2**	**.528**	**.500**	.778	**7.7**	2.0	.8	**2.1**	9.5
1981–82	Utah	82	56	20.7	.514	.300	.808	5.0	1.1	.6	.8	6.6
1982–83	Utah	75	50	31.1	.472	.200	.751	6.9	**2.2**	**.9**	1.5	**11.0**
1983–84	Cleveland	51	4	16.8	.439	.200	.791	3.6	1.0	.4	.6	3.6
1984–85	Cleveland	79	6	21.0	.460	.176	.796	6.0	1.0	.6	.7	6.7
1985–86	Cleveland	81	3	18.5	.477	.200	.720	4.6	1.0	.4	.4	5.0
1986–87	Cleveland	37	1	11.8	.500	.000	.795	2.1	.8	.2	.6	3.1
1986–87	Chicago	21	1	8.0	.525	.000	.818	1.1	.3	.1	.6	2.4
Career		718	203	22.0	.483	.220	.779	5.2	1.2	.5	1.1	6.8

==== Playoffs ====
Year	Team	GP	GS	MPG	FG%	3P%	FT%	RPG	APG	SPG	BPG	PPG
1985	Cleveland	4	0	22.8	.619	.000	.800	3.5	.3	.5	1.5	7.5

== See also ==
- List of National Basketball Association players with most blocks in a game
