= List of NBA single-game blocks leaders =

This is a complete list of National Basketball Association players who have blocked 10 or more shots in a game.

48 players have blocked 10 or more shots in a game. It has occurred 164 times (including the playoffs) in NBA history. Mark Eaton accomplished the feat more times than anyone else in league history (19), followed by Manute Bol (18). Mark Eaton, Hakeem Olajuwon, Andrew Bynum, and Victor Wembanyama are the only players to block 10 or more shots in a playoff game, with Andrew Bynum being the only player to do so with a victory.

The NBA did not record blocked shots until 1973–74 NBA season.

== Key ==
^	Active NBA player
*	Inducted into the Naismith Memorial Basketball Hall of Fame
†	Not yet eligible for Hall of Fame consideration (Note: A player is not eligible for induction into the Naismith Memorial Basketball Hall of Fame until he has been fully retired for two calendar years.)
§	1st time eligible for Hall of Fame in 2025
	Occurred in playoff competition
	Lost in that game

== Single-game leaders ==
Blocks	Player	Team	Date	Opponent	Score	Minutes played	Points	Rebounds	Assists	Triple-double	Led the league in blocks	Notes	Ref.
17	Elmore Smith	Los Angeles Lakers	October 28, 1973	Portland Trail Blazers	111–98	48	12	16	2	Yes	Yes	11 blocks in a half, setting the NBA record. 6 blocks in one quarter; 5 blocks in the other quarter.	
15	Manute Bol	Washington Bullets	January 25, 1986	Atlanta Hawks	111–103	43	4	4	0	No	Yes	Rookie single-game record.	
15	Manute Bol (2)	Washington Bullets	February 26, 1987	Indiana Pacers	100–94	47	10	19	1	Yes	No	8 blocks in the fourth quarter, tying the NBA record. 10 blocks in the second half.	
15	Shaquille O'Neal*	Orlando Magic	November 20, 1993	New Jersey Nets	87–85	36	24	28	3	Yes	No	20–20–15. 7 blocks in the first half. 5 blocks in the third quarter. 3 blocks in the fourth quarter, all three of which came in the last 7:15 of the game on shots by Armen Gilliam. O'Neal had "a slight cold".	
14	Elmore Smith (2)	Los Angeles Lakers	October 26, 1973	Detroit Pistons	94–92	48	18	13	2	Yes	Yes		
14	Elmore Smith (3)	Los Angeles Lakers	November 4, 1973	Houston Rockets	106–93	45	9	18	2	No	Yes	Smith broke a bone in his cheek on a collision in the first quarter, but stayed in the game.	
14	Mark Eaton	Utah Jazz	January 18, 1985	Portland Trail Blazers	127–122	41	12	20	3	Yes	Yes	9 blocks in first half. Eaton shot 1–12 from the field, prompting teammate Darrell Griffith to say, "It was a quadruple-double – points, blocks, rebounds and bricks."	
14	Mark Eaton (2)	Utah Jazz	February 18, 1989	San Antonio Spurs	107–93	41	8	9	1	No	No	6 blocks in both the second and fourth quarters.	
13	George T. Johnson	San Antonio Spurs	February 24, 1981	Golden State Warriors	131–126	28	9	9	0	No	Yes	11 blocks in the second half, tying the NBA record. The Spurs combined for 20 blocks.	
13	Mark Eaton (3)	Utah Jazz	February 18, 1983	Portland Trail Blazers	97–101	41	16	9	2	No	No	9 blocks in the first half. Rookie.	
13	Darryl Dawkins	New Jersey Nets	November 5, 1983	Philadelphia 76ers	112–119	41	17	8	2	No	No	The Nets combined for 19 blocks.	
13	Ralph Sampson*	Houston Rockets	December 9, 1983	Chicago Bulls	115–112	49	28	18	5	Yes	No	Overtime. Rookie. The Rockets combined for 19 blocks.	
13	Manute Bol (3)	Golden State Warriors	February 2, 1990	New Jersey Nets	128–109	33	2	11	0	No	No	8 blocks in the first half.	
13	Shawn Bradley	Dallas Mavericks	April 7, 1998	Portland Trail Blazers	91–99	38	22	22	0	Yes	No	20–20–10. Did not start game. Quarterly blocks of 5, 2, 1 and 5.	
12	Nate Thurmond*	Chicago Bulls	October 18, 1974	Atlanta Hawks	120–115	45	22	14	13	Yes	No	First quadruple-double in NBA history. Overtime. First game of season, and Thurmond's debut with the Chicago Bulls.	
12	George T. Johnson (2)	New Jersey Nets	March 21, 1978	New Orleans Jazz	114–117	37	17	13	1	Yes	Yes	9 blocks in the second half.	
12	Wayne "Tree" Rollins	Atlanta Hawks	February 21, 1979	Portland Trail Blazers	106–83	27	11	13	0	Yes	No	Did not start game.	
12	Mark Eaton (4)	Utah Jazz	February 5, 1983	Denver Nuggets	136–143	35	12	14	6	Yes	No	Did not start game. Rookie.	
12	Mark Eaton (5)	Utah Jazz	March 17, 1984	Dallas Mavericks	118–103	30	6	6	2	No	Yes	6 blocks in third quarter.	
12	Mark Eaton (6)	Utah Jazz	February 26, 1985	Dallas Mavericks	103–96	45	9	15	2	No	Yes		
12	Manute Bol (4)	Washington Bullets	December 12, 1985	Milwaukee Bucks	110–108	48	18	9	1	No	Yes	Rookie. 8 blocks in the first quarter, setting the NBA record, and 11 blocks in the first half, tying the NBA record. Overtime.	
12	Mark Eaton (7)	Utah Jazz	November 1, 1986	Portland Trail Blazers	119–110	38	15	20	2	Yes	Yes		
12	Manute Bol (5)	Washington Bullets	February 5, 1987	Cleveland Cavaliers	94–85	23	6	3	1	No	No	Did not start game. 8 blocks in the second half.	
12	Hakeem Olajuwon*	Houston Rockets	March 10, 1987	Seattle SuperSonics	127–136	53	38	17	6	Yes	No	Five-by-five (7 steals). Double overtime.	
12	Manute Bol (6)	Washington Bullets	March 26, 1987	Boston Celtics	106–103	43	6	17	0	No	No		
12	Manute Bol (7)	Golden State Warriors	February 22, 1989	San Antonio Spurs	118–107	30	7	6	0	No	Yes	Did not start game.	
12	Hakeem Olajuwon* (2)	Houston Rockets	November 11, 1989	Utah Jazz	100–92	42	24	21	2	Yes	Yes	20–20–10. 6 blocks in the second quarter.	
12	David Robinson*	San Antonio Spurs	February 23, 1990	Minnesota Timberwolves	105–95	36	24	12	2	Yes	No	Rookie.	
12	Dikembe Mutombo*	Denver Nuggets	April 18, 1993	Los Angeles Clippers	94–83	43	16	21	2	Yes	No		
12	Shawn Bradley (2)	New Jersey Nets	April 17, 1996	Toronto Raptors	107–95	37	11	10	2	Yes	No	6 blocks in the first quarter; 8 blocks in the first half.	
12	Vlade Divac*	Charlotte Hornets	February 12, 1997	New Jersey Nets	113–100	41	18	9	2	No	No	Fouled out.	
12	Keon Clark	Toronto Raptors	March 23, 2001	Atlanta Hawks	112–86	28	13	8	2	No	No	Did not start game. The Raptors combined for 23 blocks, an NBA record at the time. Clark blocked 10 shots in the first half; 5 in both the first and second quarters. Did not commit a personal foul; holds the NBA record for most blocks in a game without a personal foul.	
12	JaVale McGee^	Washington Wizards	March 15, 2011	Chicago Bulls	79–98	39:22	11	12	1	Yes	No	7 blocks in the first half.	
12	Hassan Whiteside	Miami Heat	January 25, 2015	Chicago Bulls	96–84	24:37	14	13	0	Yes	No	First NBA career triple-double. Did not start game. 4 blocks in the last 2 minutes of the game.	
12	Victor Wembanyama^	San Antonio Spurs	May 4, 2026	Minnesota Timberwolves	102–104	40	11	15	5	Yes	Yes	Most blocks recorded in a playoff game in NBA history.	
11	Kareem Abdul-Jabbar*	Los Angeles Lakers	December 3, 1975	Detroit Pistons	118–110	46	29	21	2	Yes	Yes	20–20–10.	
11	George T. Johnson (3)	Golden State Warriors	March 30, 1976	Chicago Bulls	94–84	29	6	8	0	No	No		
11	Artis Gilmore*	Chicago Bulls	December 20, 1977	Atlanta Hawks	94–86	41	35	15		Yes	No	6 blocks in the fourth quarter, most of them at the end of the game to secure the win, and 9 blocks in the second half.	
11	Elvin Hayes*	Washington Bullets	March 3, 1978	Detroit Pistons	124–108	47	22	27	0	Yes	No	20–20–10. 7 blocks in the first half.	
11	Robert Parish*	Golden State Warriors	October 29, 1978	Cleveland Cavaliers	99–94	45	22	16	1	Yes	No		
11	Kareem Abdul-Jabbar* (2)	Los Angeles Lakers	November 28, 1978	Detroit Pistons	103–105	43	27	16	4	Yes	Yes	The Lakers committed 29 turnovers in the loss.	
11	Kareem Abdul-Jabbar* (3)	Los Angeles Lakers	November 25, 1979	Kansas City Kings	111–110	41	25	15	3	Yes	Yes	7 blocks in the second half.	
11	Wayne "Tree" Rollins (2)	Atlanta Hawks	November 27, 1982	Indiana Pacers	117–98	36	10	15	2	Yes	Yes		
11	Mark Eaton (8)	Utah Jazz	January 1, 1985	Indiana Pacers	117–119	38	4	13	5	No	Yes		
11	Hakeem Olajuwon* (3)	Houston Rockets	January 7, 1986	Golden State Warriors	124–115	40	26	12	7	Yes	No	Houston improved to 18–0 at home with the win.	
11	Mark Eaton (9)	Utah Jazz	March 17, 1987	Golden State Warriors	118–103	38	9	11	0	No	Yes		
11	Mark Eaton (10)	Utah Jazz	December 30, 1988	Philadelphia 76ers	102–95	43	6	12	2	No	No		
11	Larry Nance	Cleveland Cavaliers	January 7, 1989	New York Knicks	104–96	36	24	6	4	No	No		
11	Mark Eaton (11)	Utah Jazz	January 12, 1989	San Antonio Spurs	115–91	37	7	17	3	No	No		
11	Manute Bol (8)	Golden State Warriors	January 27, 1989	Philadelphia 76ers	112–113	21	2	4	0	No	Yes		
11	David Robinson* (2)	San Antonio Spurs	February 2, 1990	Charlotte Hornets	118–107	35	27	15	3	Yes	No	Rookie.	
11	Hakeem Olajuwon* (4)	Houston Rockets	March 3, 1990	Golden State Warriors	129–109	40	29	18	9	Yes	Yes	Near quadruple-double, originally credited as one but one assist was officially discredited. Five-by-five (5 steals).	
11	Hakeem Olajuwon* (5)	Houston Rockets	March 29, 1990	Milwaukee Bucks	120–94	40	18	16	10	Yes	Yes	Third quadruple-double in NBA history.	
11	Hakeem Olajuwon* (6)	Houston Rockets	December 20, 1990	Orlando Magic	128–126	50	24	16	4	Yes	Yes	Overtime.	
11	David Robinson* (3)	San Antonio Spurs	December 28, 1990	Sacramento Kings	104–88	35	27	13	2	Yes	No		
11	David Robinson* (4)	San Antonio Spurs	January 12, 1991	Utah Jazz	112–92	39	22	18	5	Yes	No		
11	David Robinson* (5)	San Antonio Spurs	February 4, 1992	Portland Trail Blazers	95–88	45	23	14	3	Yes	Yes		
11	Dikembe Mutombo* (2)	Denver Nuggets	November 26, 1993	Portland Trail Blazers	112–101	39	17	13	1	Yes	Yes		
11	Dikembe Mutombo* (3)	Denver Nuggets	April 5, 1994	Los Angeles Clippers	91–92	33	11	16	0	Yes	Yes		
11	Dikembe Mutombo* (4)	Denver Nuggets	April 7, 1994	Seattle SuperSonics	104–90	36	13	13	2	Yes	Yes		
11	Dikembe Mutombo* (5)	Denver Nuggets	November 8, 1994	Dallas Mavericks	115–107	46	12	14	2	Yes	Yes		
11	Shawn Bradley (3)	New Jersey Nets	March 14, 1996	Washington Bullets	92–100	41	19	17	3	Yes	No		
11	Shawn Bradley (4)	New Jersey Nets	December 21, 1996	Boston Celtics	101–100	42	17	15	4	Yes	Yes		
11	Shawn Bradley (5)	New Jersey Nets	February 6, 1997	Indiana Pacers	100–104	37	14	14	0	Yes	Yes		
11	Greg Ostertag	Utah Jazz	January 6, 1998	Philadelphia 76ers	98–95	49	3	9	4	No	No	Overtime.	
11	Marcus Camby	Toronto Raptors	April 14, 1998	New Jersey Nets	96–92	43	15	12	2	Yes	Yes		
11	Dikembe Mutombo* (6)	Atlanta Hawks	February 15, 2000	New Jersey Nets	103–86	38	21	13	1	Yes	No		
11	Marcus Camby (2)	Denver Nuggets	January 17, 2008	Utah Jazz	120–109	43:44	8	24	1	No	Yes		
11	Serge Ibaka	Oklahoma City Thunder	February 19, 2012	Denver Nuggets	124–118	40:41	14	15	0	Yes	Yes	10 blocks in regulation, 8 blocks in the second half, and 1 in overtime.	
11	Roy Hibbert	Indiana Pacers	November 21, 2012	New Orleans Hornets	115–107	36:27	10	11	1	Yes	No	9 blocks in regulation, 2 in overtime.	
11	Joakim Noah	Chicago Bulls	February 28, 2013	Philadelphia 76ers	93–82	45:00	23	21	1	Yes	No	20–20–10.	
11	Hassan Whiteside (2)	Miami Heat	January 15, 2016	Denver Nuggets	98–95	38:32	19	17	2	Yes	Yes		
10	Kareem Abdul-Jabbar* (4)	Milwaukee Bucks	November 3, 1973	Detroit Pistons	123–115	53	19	16	5	Yes	No	Overtime.	
10	Elmore Smith (5)	Los Angeles Lakers	November 30, 1973	Kansas City-Omaha Kings	123–107	44	14	10	3	Yes	Yes		
10	Elmore Smith (6)	Los Angeles Lakers	December 11, 1973	Cleveland Cavaliers	100–101	53	10	17	2	Yes	Yes	Overtime.	
10	Elmore Smith (7)	Los Angeles Lakers	March 16, 1975	Golden State Warriors	111–95	42	7	22	7	No	No		
10	Harvey Catchings	Philadelphia 76ers	March 21, 1975	Atlanta Hawks	114–103	20	4	5	1	No	No	All ten blocks in the second half. Did not start game. Rookie.	
10	Kareem Abdul-Jabbar* (5)	Los Angeles Lakers	November 2, 1975	Atlanta Hawks	116–113	49	39	23	5	Yes	Yes	20–20–10. Overtime.	
10	George T. Johnson (4)	Golden State Warriors	April 3, 1976	Seattle SuperSonics	130–115	26	10	6	1	No	No	Did not start game. 6 blocks in the second quarter. Fouled out.	
10	George T. Johnson (5)	New Jersey Nets	October 26, 1977	Atlanta Hawks	110–113	35	7	12	3	No	Yes	Overtime.	
10	Joe Meriweather	New Orleans Jazz	October 28, 1977	Phoenix Suns	114–107	34	10	14	4	Yes	No	8 blocks in second half.	
10	Joe Meriweather (2)	New York Knicks	December 12, 1979	Atlanta Hawks	102–114	31	12	6	0	No	No		
10	Kareem Abdul-Jabbar* (6)	Los Angeles Lakers	January 18, 1980	Atlanta Hawks	108–102	39	28	15	2	Yes	Yes		
10	George T. Johnson (6)	New Jersey Nets	March 4, 1980	Indiana Pacers	114–109	36	8	11	3	No	No		
10	Wayne "Tree" Rollins (3)	Atlanta Hawks	March 14, 1980	Boston Celtics	88–87	39	5	23	2	No	No		
10	Ben Poquette	Utah Jazz	December 12, 1980	Chicago Bulls	98–118	40	16	5	2	No	No		
10	Edgar Jones	Detroit Pistons	December 17, 1981	Indiana Pacers	96–100	38	25	13	1	Yes	No		
10	Kareem Abdul-Jabbar* (7)	Los Angeles Lakers	January 22, 1982	Detroit Pistons	123–111	35	19	10	0	Yes	No		
10	Wayne "Tree" Rollins (4)	Atlanta Hawks	December 21, 1982	Chicago Bulls	116–124	41	14	15	0	Yes	Yes	7 blocks in the first half. Double overtime. The Hawks combined for 18 blocks.	
10	Wayne "Tree" Rollins (5)	Atlanta Hawks	January 17, 1983	New Jersey Nets	102–96	39	13	9	1	No	Yes		
10	Wayne "Tree" Rollins (6)	Atlanta Hawks	March 29, 1983	Cleveland Cavaliers	95–82	35	6	9	1	No	Yes	8 blocks in the first half.	
10	Wayne "Tree" Rollins (7)	Atlanta Hawks	November 4, 1983	Chicago Bulls	103–90	36	15	11	2	Yes	No		
10	Mark Eaton (12)	Utah Jazz	November 30, 1983	San Diego Clippers	117–115	37	15	9	1	No	Yes		
10	Wayne "Tree" Rollins (8)	Atlanta Hawks	December 13, 1983	Washington Bullets	94–89	38	2	5	0	No	No		
10	Mark Eaton (13)	Utah Jazz	February 21, 1984	Chicago Bulls	117–95	33	7	12	2	No	Yes		
10	Mark Eaton (14)	Utah Jazz	March 27, 1984	Kansas City Kings	110–106	31	6	10	2	No	Yes	Fouled out. Accounted for all of his team's blocks.	
10	Mark Eaton (15)	Utah Jazz	November 7, 1984	San Antonio Spurs	136–124	34	12	11	0	Yes	Yes		
10	Mark Eaton (16)	Utah Jazz	February 1, 1985	Dallas Mavericks	121–109	42	12	20	1	Yes	Yes	6 blocks in third quarter.	
10	Artis Gilmore* (2)	San Antonio Spurs	February 4, 1985	Golden State Warriors	114–109	37	25	13	1	Yes	No	Overtime.	
10	Mark Eaton (17)	Utah Jazz	February 5, 1985	Portland Trail Blazers	106–126	36	17	10	2	Yes	Yes		
10	Mark Eaton (18)	Utah Jazz	April 26, 1985	Houston Rockets	94–96	40	8	10	0	No	Yes	5 blocks in the first quarter, and 7 blocks in the first half.	
10	Manute Bol (9)	Washington Bullets	January 8, 1986	Phoenix Suns	97–109	37	2	7	1	No	Yes	Rookie.	
10	Manute Bol (10)	Washington Bullets	February 17, 1986	Los Angeles Clippers	96–94	38	8	13	0	No	Yes	Rookie. Bol accounted for all of his team's blocks.	
10	Mark Eaton (19)	Utah Jazz	February 22, 1986	Phoenix Suns	105–97	40	9	13	2	No	No		
10	Manute Bol (11)	Washington Bullets	February 25, 1986	Indiana Pacers	87–100	30	0	5	0	No	Yes	Rookie.	
10	Larry Nance (2)	Phoenix Suns	January 4, 1988	Philadelphia 76ers	114–122	40	17	11	5	Yes	No	Fouled out.	
10	Manute Bol (12)	Washington Bullets	January 22, 1988	Golden State Warriors	115–91	15	6	10	0	No	No	Did not start game. Shortest time to achieve 10 blocks.	
10	Benoit Benjamin	Los Angeles Clippers	January 29, 1988	Milwaukee Bucks	88–97	35	12	8	3	No	No		
10	Hakeem Olajuwon* (7)	Houston Rockets	April 21, 1988	San Antonio Spurs	116–117	42	38	10	4	Yes	No		
10	Manute Bol (13)	Golden State Warriors	November 12, 1988	Portland Trail Blazers	107–100	34	3	10	0	No	Yes	Did not start game.	
10	Manute Bol (14)	Golden State Warriors	December 17, 1988	San Antonio Spurs	123–113	29	3	8	0	No	Yes	Did not start game.	
10	Wayne Cooper	Denver Nuggets	December 30, 1988	Miami Heat	109–83	25	6	13	1	No	No		
10	Manute Bol (15)	Golden State Warriors	February 16, 1989	Los Angeles Clippers	143–138	32	2	5	0	No	Yes	Overtime. Did not start game.	
10	Manute Bol (16)	Golden State Warriors	March 10, 1989	Utah Jazz	112–126	27	8	5	0	No	Yes	Did not start game.	
10	Benoit Benjamin (2)	Los Angeles Clippers	March 31, 1989	San Antonio Spurs	109–106	44	25	10	3	Yes	No		
10	Hakeem Olajuwon* (8)	Houston Rockets	December 17, 1989	Orlando Magic	109–94	43	32	25	2	Yes	Yes	20–20–10.	
10	David Robinson* (6)	San Antonio Spurs	February 20, 1990	Los Angeles Lakers	114–115	41	23	16	2	Yes	No	Rookie. Overtime.	
10	Charles Jones	Washington Bullets	March 3, 1990	Orlando Magic	132–128	49	2	13	2	No	No	Double overtime.	
10	Manute Bol (17)	Golden State Warriors	March 12, 1990	Los Angeles Clippers	112–109	18	0	4	1	No	No	Did not start game. 7 blocks in a quarter. Block with 35 seconds left helped secure the win.	
10	Hakeem Olajuwon* (9)	Houston Rockets	April 29, 1990	Los Angeles Lakers	100–104	43	11	11	1	Yes	Yes		
10	David Robinson* (7)	San Antonio Spurs	January 10, 1991	Orlando Magic	117–111	41	43	12	3	Yes	No	40–10–10.	
10	Shawn Kemp	Seattle SuperSonics	January 18, 1991	Los Angeles Lakers	96–105	40	20	8	3	No	No		
10	Manute Bol (18)	Philadelphia 76ers	February 14, 1991	Sacramento Kings	81–98	30	3	8	0	No	No	Did not start game.	
10	Dikembe Mutombo* (7)	Denver Nuggets	March 10, 1992	Orlando Magic	89–82	42	13	8	1	No	No	Rookie.	
10	David Robinson* (8)	San Antonio Spurs	November 10, 1992	Milwaukee Bucks	104–98	43	29	9	5	No	No		
10	Hakeem Olajuwon* (10)	Houston Rockets	January 3, 1993	Portland Trail Blazers	101–103	44	40	9	3	No	Yes	Overtime. Fouled out.	
10	Dikembe Mutombo* (8)	Denver Nuggets	March 25, 1993	Golden State Warriors	99–88	40	21	16	2	Yes	No		
10	David Robinson* (9)	San Antonio Spurs	November 9, 1993	Minnesota Timberwolves	110–95	41	43	11	1	Yes	No	40–10–10.	
10	Dikembe Mutombo* (9)	Denver Nuggets	December 10, 1993	Utah Jazz	107–98	35	13	9	3	No	Yes		
10	David Robinson* (10)	San Antonio Spurs	February 17, 1994	Detroit Pistons	115–96	43	34	10	10	Yes	No	Fourth quadruple-double in NBA history.	
10	Dikembe Mutombo* (10)	Denver Nuggets	April 2, 1995	Cleveland Cavaliers	104–101	47	18	18	1	Yes	Yes		
10	Dikembe Mutombo* (11)	Denver Nuggets	December 2, 1995	Minnesota Timberwolves	109–105	46	22	16	2	Yes	Yes		
10	Hakeem Olajuwon* (11)	Houston Rockets	December 13, 1995	Vancouver Grizzlies	100–89	38	15	14	3	Yes	No		
10	Shawn Bradley (6)	New Jersey Nets	March 12, 1996	Phoenix Suns	88–98	33	8	12	4	No	No		
10	Hakeem Olajuwon* (12)	Houston Rockets	April 13, 1996	Dallas Mavericks	112–111	32	31	13	6	Yes	No		
10	Shawn Bradley (7)	New Jersey Nets	April 19, 1996	Boston Celtics	106–112	32	17	13	0	Yes	No		
10	Shawn Bradley (8)	New Jersey Nets	November 8, 1996	Orlando Magic	82–86	28	6	10	0	No	Yes		
10	Shawn Bradley (9)	New Jersey Nets	November 23, 1996	Dallas Mavericks	114–91	25	8	12	0	No	Yes		
10	Shawn Bradley (10)	Dallas Mavericks	March 4, 1997	Los Angeles Lakers	92–102	26	12	9	0	No	Yes	6 blocks in the third quarter; 8 blocks in the second half.	
10	Marcus Camby (3)	Toronto Raptors	April 19, 1998	Philadelphia 76ers	78–107	30	13	11	1	Yes	Yes	Last game of season.	
10	Dikembe Mutombo* (12)	Philadelphia 76ers	December 1, 2001	Chicago Bulls	93–76	39	16	19	0	Yes	No	8 blocks in the third quarter, tying the NBA record, and 9 blocks in the second half.	
10	Ben Wallace*	Detroit Pistons	February 24, 2002	Milwaukee Bucks	82–89	39	10	17	1	Yes	Yes		
10	Ben Wallace* (2)	Detroit Pistons	November 20, 2002	Miami Heat	79–68	43	12	19	1	Yes	No		
10	Jermaine O'Neal	Indiana Pacers	January 22, 2003	Toronto Raptors	101–98	43	18	10	3	Yes	No		
10	Dikembe Mutombo* (13)	New York Knicks	January 4, 2004	New Jersey Nets	85–95	42	4	5	0	No	No		
10	Calvin Booth	Seattle SuperSonics	January 13, 2004	Cleveland Cavaliers	96–104	17	2	0	0	No	No	One of only three players to have ten or more blocks without committing a personal foul.	
10	Amar'e Stoudemire*	Phoenix Suns	February 7, 2004	Utah Jazz	92–96	39	20	6	1	No	No	6 blocks in the first quarter; 7 blocks in the first half.	
10	Josh Smith	Atlanta Hawks	December 18, 2004	Dallas Mavericks	68–90	34	9	7	4	No	No	At 19 years and 13 days old, the rookie Smith became the youngest player to record 10 or more blocks. Did not commit a personal foul, one of only three players to have ten or more blocks in a game without committing a personal foul.	
10	Andrei Kirilenko	Utah Jazz	March 25, 2006	Sacramento Kings	89–91	39:49	15	14	3	Yes	No		
10	Emeka Okafor	Charlotte Bobcats	January 12, 2007	New York Knicks	126–110	41:39	20	9	1	No	No		
10	Marcus Camby (4)	Denver Nuggets	December 26, 2007	Milwaukee Bucks	125–105	30:12	10	11	5	Yes	Yes		
10	Dwight Howard*	Orlando Magic	November 12, 2008	Oklahoma City Thunder	109–92	38:06	30	19	3	Yes	Yes	7 blocks in the first half.	
10	Serge Ibaka (2)	Oklahoma City Thunder	February 1, 2012	Dallas Mavericks	95–86	39:59	4	11	1	No	Yes		
10	Serge Ibaka (3)	Oklahoma City Thunder	February 9, 2012	Sacramento Kings	101–106	30:26	6	9	0	No	Yes		
10	Andrew Bynum	Los Angeles Lakers	April 29, 2012	Denver Nuggets	103–88	35:32	10	13	0	Yes	No		
10	Larry Sanders^	Milwaukee Bucks	November 30, 2012	Minnesota Timberwolves	85–95	32:08	10	12	1	Yes	No		
10	Hassan Whiteside (3)	Miami Heat	November 17, 2015	Minnesota Timberwolves	91–103	33:49	22	14	0	Yes	Yes		
10	Hassan Whiteside (4)	Miami Heat	February 5, 2016	Charlotte Hornets	98–95	27:02	10	10	0	Yes	Yes	Did not start game.	
10	Anthony Davis^	New Orleans Pelicans	March 11, 2018	Utah Jazz	99–116	40	25	11	3	Yes	Yes		
10	Hassan Whiteside (5)	Portland Trail Blazers	November 29, 2019	Chicago Bulls	107–103	29:58	8	15	1	No	No	New franchise record in blocks.	
10	Clint Capela^	Atlanta Hawks	January 22, 2021	Minnesota Timberwolves	116–98	30:07	13	19	0	Yes	No		
10	Victor Wembanyama^ (2)	San Antonio Spurs	February 12, 2024	Toronto Raptors	122–99	28:59	27	14	5	Yes	Yes	Rookie.	
10	Victor Wembanyama^ (3)	San Antonio Spurs	December 21, 2024	Portland Trail Blazers	114–94	29:45	30	7	3	No	Yes		

== See also ==
- NBA records
- List of NCAA Division I men's basketball players with 13 or more blocks in a game
