= Lonnie Shelton =

American basketball player (1955–2018)

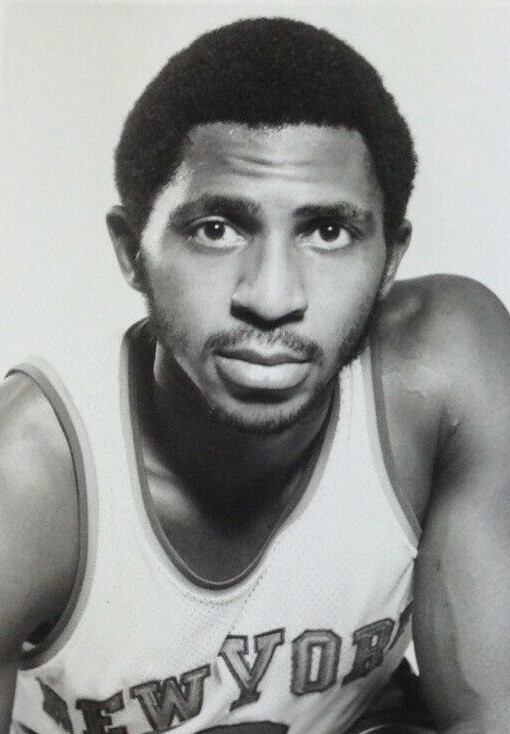

Personal information
- Born: October 19, 1955 Bakersfield, California, U.S.
- Died: July 8, 2018 (aged 62) Westminster, California, U.S.
- Listed height: 6 ft 8 in (2.03 m)
- Listed weight: 240 lb (109 kg)

Career information
- High school: Foothill (Bakersfield, California)
- College: Oregon State (1973–1976)
- NBA draft: 1976: 2nd round, 25th overall pick
- Drafted by: New York Knicks
- Playing career: 1976–1986
- Position: Power forward / center
- Number: 8

Career history
- 1976–1978: New York Knicks
- 1978–1983: Seattle SuperSonics
- 1983–1986: Cleveland Cavaliers

Career highlights
- NBA champion (1979); NBA All-Star (1982); NBA All-Defensive Second Team (1982); First-team All-Pac-8 (1975)

Career statistics
- Points: 8,049 (12.0 ppg)
- Rebounds: 4,136 (6.1 rpg)
- Assists: 1,459 (2.2 apg)
- Stats at NBA.com
- Stats at Basketball Reference

Lonnie Jewel Shelton (October 19, 1955 – July 8, 2018) was an American National Basketball Association (NBA) player who played from 1976 to 1985.

== Early years ==
Shelton was born in Bakersfield, California. He played college basketball for Oregon State University. He was drafted by the Memphis Sounds (soon to become the Baltimore Claws) of the American Basketball Association in 1975 but elected to stay in college. He was then selected by the New York Knicks in the second round of the 1976 NBA draft.

== Professional career ==
Shelton led the NBA in personal fouls in his first two seasons with New York. On December 16, 1977, Shelton scored a career-high 41 points during a 152–150 triple overtime loss to the Milwaukee Bucks. After the Knicks obtained free agent Marvin Webster from the SuperSonics in 1978, the NBA awarded Shelton and the Knicks’ 1979 first-round pick to Seattle as compensation.

In 1979, his first season with the SuperSonics, Shelton was the team's starting power forward. That season, he set a SuperSonics record by going 13 for 13 from the field in a game (17 total consecutive field goals), and helped the SuperSonics win the NBA Finals. Shelton was one of three SuperSonics represented in the 1982 NBA All-Star Game (along with Jack Sikma and Gus Williams) and was named to the NBA's 1982 2nd All-Defense Team. Shelton played five seasons with the Seattle SuperSonics and finished his career playing for the Cleveland Cavaliers for three seasons.

== Personal life ==
Shelton's sons include L. J., who played offensive tackle in the NFL, Tim Shelton, who played for the San Diego State Aztecs basketball team, Titus Shelton, who played for the Cal Poly San Luis Obispo Mustangs basketball team from 2005 to 2009, and Marlon, who played for the Washington Huskies from 1998 to 2003. He had multiple grandchildren.

=== Death ===
Shelton died on July 8, 2018, at age 62 in Westminster, California, of complications from a heart attack on May 5 which left him in a coma.

== NBA career statistics ==
Legend
GP	Games played	GS	Games started	MPG	Minutes per game
FG%	Field goal percentage	3P%	3-point field goal percentage	FT%	Free throw percentage
RPG	Rebounds per game	APG	Assists per game	SPG	Steals per game
BPG	Blocks per game	PPG	Points per game	**Bold**	Career high
†	Won an NBA championship

=== Regular season ===
Year	Team	GP	GS	MPG	FG%	3P%	FT%	RPG	APG	SPG	BPG	PPG
1976–77	New York	**82**	-	25.7	.476	-	.707	**7.7**	1.8	1.5	1.2	11.6
1977–78	New York	**82**	-	28.3	.514	-	.736	7.1	2.4	1.3	**1.4**	**14.9**
1978–79†	Seattle	76	-	28.4	.519	-	.693	6.2	1.4	1.0	1.0	13.5
1979–80	Seattle	76	-	29.5	**.530**	**.200**	.763	**7.7**	1.9	1.2	1.0	13.6
1980–81	Seattle	14	-	31.4	.420	-	.655	5.6	2.5	**1.6**	.2	13.0
1981–82	Seattle	81	81	**32.9**	.486	.000	.783	6.3	**3.1**	1.2	.5	**14.9**
1982–83	Seattle	**82**	79	31.4	.478	.167	.754	6.0	2.9	.9	.9	12.4
1983–84	Cleveland	79	78	26.6	.476	**.200**	.764	4.8	2.3	1.0	.7	10.8
1984–85	Cleveland	57	14	21.8	.435	.000	.662	4.7	1.7	.8	.3	6.4
1985–86	Cleveland	44	1	15.5	.489	.000	**.875**	3.3	1.4	.5	.1	4.5
Career		673	253	27.5	.492	.097	.738	6.1	2.2	1.1	.8	12.0
All-Star		1	1	20.0	1.000	-	.500	9.0	1.0	1.0	.0	7.0

=== Playoffs ===
Year	Team	GP	GS	MPG	FG%	3P%	FT%	RPG	APG	SPG	BPG	PPG
1978	New York	6	-	25.2	.536	-	.750	7.3	**2.8**	.3	.8	11.0
1979†	Seattle	**17**	-	**33.3**	.483	-	.692	8.4	2.0	1.1	**1.1**	**12.9**
1980	Seattle	15	-	31.3	.507	.000	.627	8.3	1.7	**1.5**	.8	12.0
1982	Seattle	8	-	33.3	.471	-	.688	7.4	2.0	.6	.9	12.8
1983	Seattle	2	-	26.5	.174	.000	.400	**10.5**	2.5	.5	.0	5.0
1985	Cleveland	4	0	26.5	**.559**	-	**.800**	5.5	1.0	.5	.3	11.5
Career		52	0	31.0	.485	.000	.667	7.9	1.9	1.0	.8	12.0
