= Roy Hinson =

American basketball player (born 1961)

Personal information
- Born: May 2, 1961 (age 65) Trenton, New Jersey, U.S.
- Listed height: 6 ft 9 in (2.06 m)
- Listed weight: 210 lb (95 kg)

Career information
- High school: Franklin (Somerset, New Jersey)
- College: Rutgers (1979–1983)
- NBA draft: 1983: 1st round, 20th overall pick
- Drafted by: Cleveland Cavaliers
- Playing career: 1983–1991
- Position: Power forward
- Number: 32, 23, 21, 6

Career history
- 1983–1986: Cleveland Cavaliers
- 1986–1988: Philadelphia 76ers
- 1988–1991: New Jersey Nets

Career highlights
- Atlantic 10 co-Player of the Year (1983); 2× First-team All-Atlantic 10 (1982, 1983)

Career NBA statistics
- Points: 7,206 (14.2 ppg)
- Rebounds: 3,452 (6.8 rpg)
- Blocks: 882 (1.7 bpg)
- Stats at NBA.com
- Stats at Basketball Reference

Roy Hinson (born May 2, 1961) is a retired American professional basketball player who was selected by the Cleveland Cavaliers in the first round (20th pick overall) of the 1983 NBA draft. Hinson attended Franklin High School in Franklin Township, New Jersey. He then played his college career at Rutgers University in nearby New Brunswick. A 6'9" power forward–center, Hinson played in eight NBA seasons from 1983 to 1991, for the Cavaliers, Philadelphia 76ers and New Jersey Nets.

Hinson's best year as a professional came during the 1985–86 season as a member of the Cavaliers, appearing in 82 games and averaging 19.6 points per game. He also participated in the 1986 NBA Slam Dunk Contest, finishing seventh out of eight contestants. In his NBA career, Hinson played in 507 games and scored a total of 7,206 points.

After his successful 1986 season he was traded to the Philadelphia 76ers for the Number 1 overall pick in the 1986 draft which became Brad Daugherty. He was never again able to reach the same height he had in Cleveland, later going to the Nets and then retiring.

== Career statistics ==
Legend
GP	Games played	GS	Games started	MPG	Minutes per game
FG%	Field goal percentage	3P%	3-point field goal percentage	FT%	Free throw percentage
RPG	Rebounds per game	APG	Assists per game	SPG	Steals per game
BPG	Blocks per game	PPG	Points per game	**Bold**	Career high
*	Led the league

=== NBA ===
==== Regular season ====
Year	Team	GP	GS	MPG	FG%	3P%	FT%	RPG	APG	SPG	BPG	PPG
1983–84	Cleveland	80	61	23.2	.496	–	.590	6.2	.9	.4	1.8	5.5
1984–85	Cleveland	76	75	30.8	.503	.000	.721	**7.8**	.9	.7	**2.3**	15.8
1985–86	Cleveland	**82**	**82***	34.6	**.532**	.000	.719	**7.8**	1.2	.8	1.4	**19.4**
1986–87	Philadelphia	76	58	32.8	.478	.000	.758	6.4	.8	.6	2.1	13.9
1987–88	Philadelphia	29	10	29.1	.452	.000	.718	5.8	.9	.8	**2.3**	11.6
1987–88	New Jersey	37	36	**36.4**	.502	.000	.806	7.3	**1.5**	**.9**	1.5	17.6
1988–89	New Jersey	**82***	39	31.0	.482	.000	.757	6.4	.9	.4	1.5	16.0
1989–90	New Jersey	25	19	31.7	.507	–	**.869**	6.9	.9	.6	1.1	15.0
1990–91	New Jersey	9	0	10.1	.513	–	.333	2.1	.4	.0	.3	4.6
Career		507	391	30.7	.499	.000	.741	6.8	1.0	.6	1.7	14.2

==== Playoffs ====
Year	Team	GP	GS	MPG	FG%	3P%	FT%	RPG	APG	SPG	BPG	PPG
1985	Cleveland	4	**4**	30.0	.542	–	**.652**	**7.5**	**.8**	**.8**	**2.3**	16.8
1987	Philadelphia	**5**	0	**31.8**	**.596**	–	.632	4.6	.6	**.8**	2.0	**17.2**
Career		9	4	31.0	.570	–	.639	5.9	.7	.8	2.1	17.0
