= World B. Free =

American basketball player (born 1953)

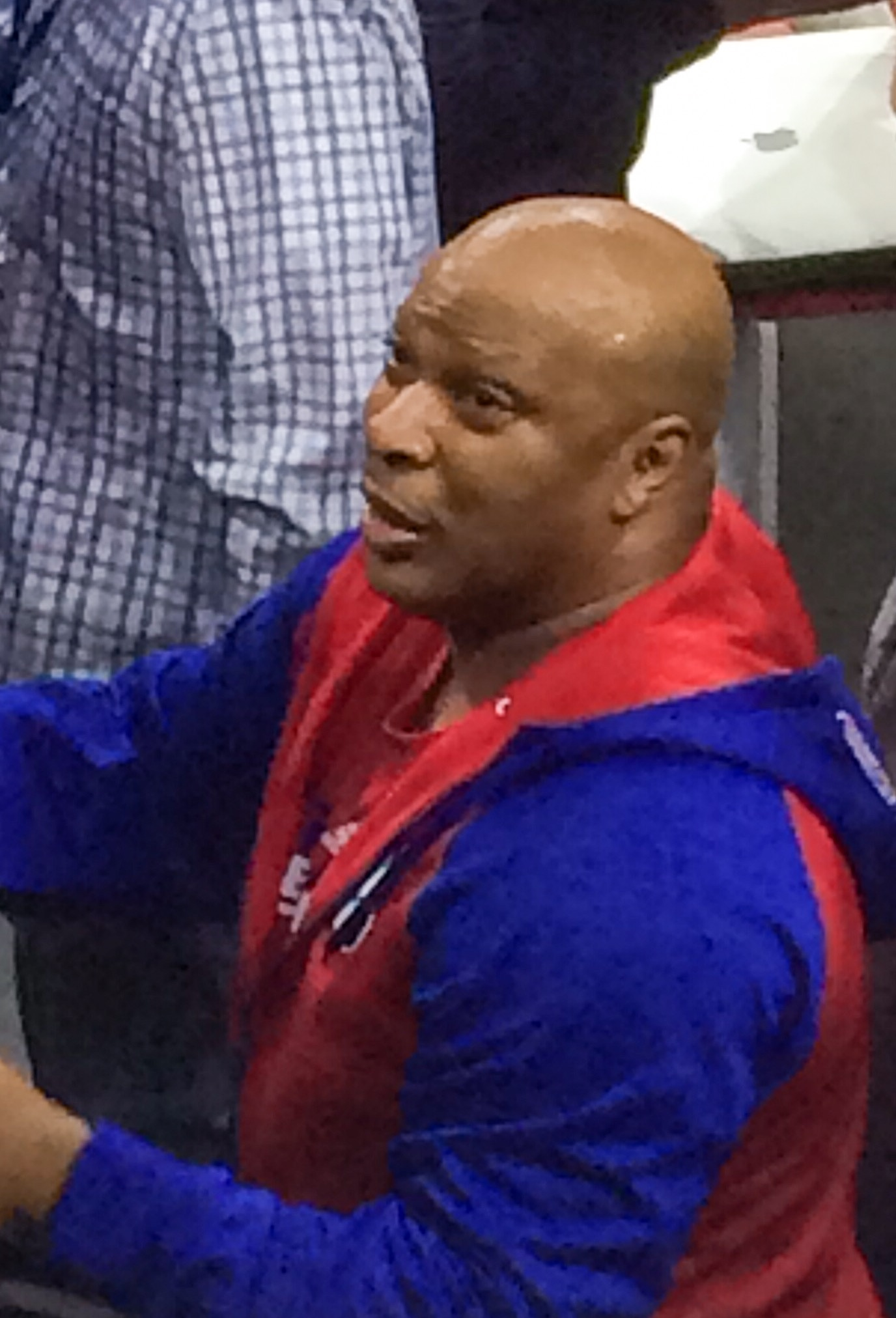
- Free in 2015

Personal information
- Born: December 9, 1953 (age 72) Atlanta, Georgia, U.S.
- Listed height: 6 ft 3 in (1.91 m)
- Listed weight: 185 lb (84 kg)

Career information
- High school: Canarsie (Brooklyn, New York)
- College: Guilford (1972–1975)
- NBA draft: 1975: 2nd round, 23rd overall pick
- Drafted by: Philadelphia 76ers
- Playing career: 1975–1988, 1991
- Position: Shooting guard / point guard
- Number: 21, 24, 12

Career history
- 1975–1978: Philadelphia 76ers
- 1978–1980: San Diego Clippers
- 1980–1982: Golden State Warriors
- 1982–1986: Cleveland Cavaliers
- 1986–1987: Philadelphia 76ers
- 1987: Miami Tropics
- 1987–1988: Houston Rockets
- 1991: Atlanta Eagles

Career highlights
- NBA All-Star (1980); All-NBA Second Team (1979); USBL champion (1987); USBL playoffs MVP (1987); NAIA tournament MVP (1973)

Career NBA statistics
- Points: 17,955 (20.3 ppg)
- Rebounds: 2,430 (2.7 rpg)
- Assists: 3,319 (3.7 apg)
- Stats at NBA.com
- Stats at Basketball Reference

World B. Free (born Lloyd Bernard Free; December 9, 1953) is an American former professional basketball player who played in the National Basketball Association (NBA) from 1975 to 1988. He went by his first name before early December, 1981. Free also was called "The Prince of Mid-Air", "Brownsville Bomber" and most often "All-World".

== Early years and education ==
Free was born on December 9, 1953, in Atlanta, Georgia. He grew up in the Brownsville neighborhood of Brooklyn, New York, and attended Canarsie High School. He played college basketball at Guilford College in Greensboro, North Carolina. As a freshman, he helped lead Guilford's basketball team in winning the NAIA national championship and was named MVP of the NAIA tournament.

== Professional career ==
Free played for the San Diego Clippers, Philadelphia 76ers, Golden State Warriors, Cleveland Cavaliers and Houston Rockets in the National Basketball Association. He got his name from his days in Brooklyn, where a friend nicknamed him "World" because of his 44-inch vertical leap and 360 degree dunks. Free was known for his "rainbow" jump shots, referring to the extreme arc of the ball during the shot. He was also known for taking high risk shots and playing flamboyantly. During Free's time playing for the San Diego Clippers, fans would shout "shoot, shoot, shoot" whenever Free took possession of the ball. Free averaged 20.3 points per game over 13 seasons in the NBA.

Free began his career in the 1975–76 NBA season as a member of the 76ers, having been selected by the 76ers with the 23rd pick of the 1975 NBA draft. In the decisive game seven of the 1977 Eastern Conference semifinal series between the Sixers and the Boston Celtics, Free helped lead his team to victory with a game-high 27 points. The Sixers subsequently defeated the Rockets in the Eastern Conference Finals, but lost to the Portland Trail Blazers in the 1977 NBA Finals. Following the 1977–78 NBA season, Free was traded to the Clippers for a future pick in the 1984 NBA draft that was ultimately used to select Charles Barkley.

For both the 1978–79 and 1979–80 campaigns, George Gervin and Free were number 1 and 2 in the league in scoring. In 1979, Free led the Clippers to an improved 43–39 record, but they narrowly missed the playoffs. His 2,244 points is the most for a season by a player that was not selected to the All-Star Game. His best statistical season was 1979–80 with the Clippers, averaging 30.2 points per game, as well as 4.2 assists per game and 3.5 rebounds per game in 68 games. He was an All-Star that season as well, although the Clippers failed to make the playoffs again.

On August 28, 1980, San Diego traded Free to Golden State for Phil Smith and a first-round pick. During the 1981-82 NBA season, Free would help the Warriors to a 45–37 record, leading the team in assists per game at 5.4 while also scoring 22.9 points per game (second on the team only to Bernard King’s 23.2 per game average). However, despite their above .500 record, they would miss the postseason. On December 15, 1983, in the middle of the 1982–83 season, he was traded to the Cleveland Cavaliers. The team finished 23–59, but the team was 3–19 prior to the Free trade. Notably in the fall of 1983, after the Cavaliers made a multi-year deal for him, management and Free came up with the stunt to have him picked up by helicopter at Burke Lakefront Airport to fly to the Richfield Coliseum to an actual carpet awaiting him for a press conference.

During the 1984–85 season, Free became the 39th player in league history to surpass 15,000 career points. During that year, now on the Cavaliers, Free made the playoffs for the first time since he was on the 76ers, and averaged career-playoff-highs of 26.3 points and 7.8 assists per game, during a 3–1 first-round loss to the Celtics. In that series, Free led the Cavaliers to a 105-98 Game 3 win with a postseason-career-high 32 points. After the year, Cleveland refused to pick up the option on his contract, which would have had them pay him $750,000 for the season; they offered him $400,000 that he rejected. In 275 games, he averaged 23 points and shot 45.4% from the field.

Free was signed by the 76ers in December 1986 only to be waived in March 1987 when Andrew Toney recovered from his injuries. Free later played in the United States Basketball League (USBL) for the Miami Tropics. He was named the USBL Playoffs MVP after leading the Tropics to the title after scoring 30 points in the championship winning game against the Rhode Island Gulls. Following the USBL season, he joined the Houston Rockets for the 1987–88 season, which was his last NBA season. For Free, the highlight of that season was November 12, 1987, when he scored 38 points against the Sacramento Kings at ARCO Arena and brought the Rockets back to win the game.

In 1991, Free had a comeback with Atlanta Eagles of the USBL, before retiring permanently.

== Player profile ==
Free loved to go one-on-one against a defender and either whirl around him or take a jump shot. His shot was possibly his greatest strength: a soft, high-arcing lob that stayed in the air longer than the average jump shot and was so straight when he was "on" that it barely jostled the net. When he was younger, on the playgrounds of New York City, his jump shot was a flat line drive, but he was tired of having the ball blocked, so he developed a new style of shooting.

== Personal life ==
Free admired Muhammad Ali.

In 1979, Free was dating Lady B and rapped freestyle with her during a trip to New York City, after which Lady B would become a highly influential radio DJ.

=== Name change ===
Free received his nickname, "All-World", from his childhood friend, Herb Smith, on the playgrounds of Brownsville. He was able to complete a 360-dunk when he was a teenager and stated that the name fit because he "could go 'round the world." On December 8, 1981, a day before his 28th birthday, Free legally changed his name to World B. Free. He claimed that the "B." stood for "just 'B'." Free had contemplated making the name change since 1978.

== Post-playing career ==
Currently, Free is director of player development and a community ambassador for the Philadelphia 76ers. Among other things, he greets fans at 76ers home games in his flamboyant/colorful wardrobe. Free has also led the Sixers' "Summer Hoops Tour". On November 30, 2005, Free was honored as a Cleveland Cavaliers Legend at halftime of the Cavaliers game against the Los Angeles Clippers. On March 26, 2022, Free was honored with a spot on the Cavaliers Wall of Honor along with former players Lenny Wilkens and Campy Russell and former owner Gordon Gund. Dick Vitale often uses his name in college basketball season previews to give the award for best name.

== NBA career statistics ==
Legend
GP	Games played	GS	Games started	MPG	Minutes per game
FG%	Field goal percentage	3P%	3-point field goal percentage	FT%	Free throw percentage
RPG	Rebounds per game	APG	Assists per game	SPG	Steals per game
BPG	Blocks per game	PPG	Points per game	**Bold**	Career high

=== Regular season ===
Year	Team	GP	GS	MPG	FG%	3P%	FT%	RPG	APG	SPG	BPG	PPG
1975–76	Philadelphia	71	–	15.8	.448	–	.602	1.8	1.5	.5	.1	8.3
1976–77	Philadelphia	**78**	–	28.9	.457	–	.720	3.0	3.4	1.0	.3	16.3
1977–78	Philadelphia	76	–	27.0	.455	–	.731	2.8	4.0	.9	**.5**	15.7
1978–79	San Diego	**78**	–	37.9	**.481**	–	.756	**3.9**	4.4	1.4	.4	28.8
1979–80	San Diego	68	–	**38.0**	.474	.360	.753	3.5	4.2	1.2	**.5**	**30.2**
1980–81	Golden State	65	–	36.5	.446	.161	**.814**	2.4	**5.6**	1.3	.2	24.1
1981–82	Golden State	**78**	**78**	35.8	.448	.179	.740	3.2	5.4	.9	.1	22.9
1982–83	Golden State	19	18	36.8	.451	.000	.711	2.3	4.7	.8	.2	22.8
1982–83	Cleveland	54	51	35.9	.458	.357	.747	2.9	3.7	**1.5**	.2	24.2
1983–84	Cleveland	75	71	31.7	.445	.319	.784	2.9	3.0	1.3	.1	22.3
1984–85	Cleveland	71	50	31.7	.459	.368	.749	3.0	4.5	1.1	.2	22.5
1985–86	Cleveland	75	75	33.8	.455	**.420**	.780	2.9	4.2	1.2	.3	23.4
1986–87	Philadelphia	20	2	14.3	.317	.222	.766	1.0	1.5	.3	.2	5.8
1987–88	Houston	58	0	11.8	.409	.229	.800	.8	1.0	.3	.1	6.4
Career		886	345	30.4	.456	.337	.753	2.7	3.7	1.0	.3	20.3
All-Star		1	1	21.0	.538	–	.000	3.0	5.0	.0	1.0	14.0

=== Playoffs ===
Year	Team	GP	GS	MPG	FG%	3P%	FT%	RPG	APG	SPG	BPG	PPG
1976	Philadelphia	3	–	20.7	.393	–	.769	0.3	1.7	1.0	0.0	10.7
1977	Philadelphia	**15**	–	18.7	.371	–	.688	2.1	1.9	0.8	0.5	11.9
1978	Philadelphia	10	–	26.8	.411	–	.728	**3.1**	3.7	0.4	**0.6**	16.1
1985	Cleveland	4	4	**37.5**	**.441**	.000	**.920**	2.5	**7.8**	**1.5**	0.0	**26.3**
1988	Houston	2	0	6.0	.000	.000	–	1.0	0.5	0.5	0.0	0.0
Career		34	4	22.7	.398	.000	.740	2.2	3.0	0.7	0.4	14.0

== See also ==
- List of National Basketball Association career free throw scoring leaders
- Metta Sandiford-Artest, formerly known as Metta World Peace.
