= 1985 NBA playoffs =

Postseason tournament

Tournament details
- Dates: April 17–June 9, 1985
- Season: 1984–85
- Teams: 16

Final positions
- Champions: Los Angeles Lakers (9th title)
- Runners-up: Boston Celtics
- Semifinalists: Denver Nuggets; Philadelphia 76ers

Tournament statistics
- Scoring leader(s): Larry Bird (Celtics) (26.0 PPG)

Awards
- MVP: Kareem Abdul-Jabbar (Lakers)

The 1985 NBA playoffs was the postseason tournament of the National Basketball Association's 1984–85 season. The tournament concluded with the Western Conference champion Los Angeles Lakers defeating the Eastern Conference champion Boston Celtics 4 games to 2 in the NBA Finals. Kareem Abdul-Jabbar was named NBA Finals MVP for the second time (he had won the award under his birth name, Lew Alcindor, as a Buck in 1971).

The Lakers had been unsuccessful in their previous eight attempts to defeat the Celtics in the NBA Finals, losing 7 times from 1959–1969 and 1984. The Lakers, moreover, won the title in Boston, something no other NBA team would accomplish until 2022, and would be the only road team to clinch the title at Boston Garden.

The Cavaliers made the playoffs for the first time since 1978.

It was also the first time that all three teams from Texas made the playoffs in the same year.

The Denver Nuggets advanced to the conference finals for the first time since 1978 and would not advance that far again until 2009. The Philadelphia 76ers, on the other hand, advanced to the conference finals for the fifth time in six years, but would not reach that level again until 2001.

It was also the first time that Turner Broadcasting was covering the playoffs as TBS was the home for some playoff games.

Games 3 and 4 of the Eastern Conference Finals at the Spectrum forced a Phil Collins concert at the arena to be canceled so that he would play the Philadelphia half of Live Aid, as noted by Charlie Van Dyke when he sub-hosted an episode of American Top 40 on July 6 of that year.

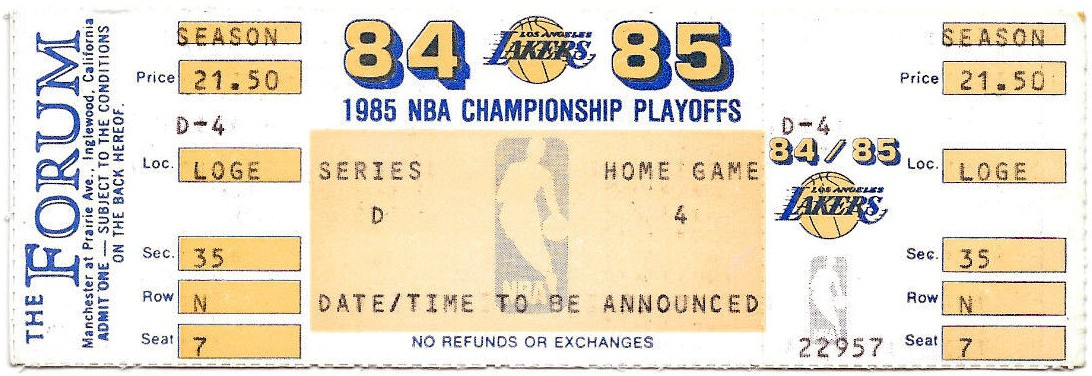
A ticket for Game 2 of the Western Conference Semifinals between the Lakers and the Trail Blazers.

== Bracket ==
First Rounds	Conference Semifinals
E1	Boston*	3
E8	Cleveland	1
E1	Boston*	4
E4	Detroit	2
E4	Detroit	3
E5	New Jersey	0
Eastern Conference
E3	Philadelphia	3
E6	Washington	1
E3	Philadelphia	4
E2	Milwaukee*	0
E2	Milwaukee*	3
E7	Chicago	1
W1	LA Lakers*	3
W8	Phoenix	0
W1	LA Lakers*	4
W5	Portland	1
W4	Dallas	1
W5	Portland	3
Western Conference
W3	Houston	2
W6	Utah	3
W6	Utah	1
W2	Denver*	4
W2	Denver*	3
W7	San Antonio	2

Conference Finals
E1	Boston*	4
E3	Philadelphia	1
W1	LA Lakers*	4
W2	Denver*	1

NBA Finals
E1	Boston*	2
W1	LA Lakers*	4

- * Division winner
- Bold Series winner
- Italic Team with home-court advantage

== First round ==
=== Eastern Conference first round ===
==== (1) Boston Celtics vs. (8) Cleveland Cavaliers ====
April 18

Boxscore

Cleveland Cavaliers 123, Boston Celtics 126
Scoring by quarter: 30–31, 28–39, 40–31, 25–25
Pts: Roy Hinson 24; Rebs: Roy Hinson 11; Asts: John Bagley 11	Pts: Larry Bird 40; Rebs: Kevin McHale 12; Asts: Dennis Johnson 11
Boston leads series, 1–0

Boston Garden, Boston, Massachusetts
Attendance: 14,890
Referees: Wally Rooney, Hugh Evans

April 20

Boxscore

Cleveland Cavaliers 106, Boston Celtics 108
Scoring by quarter: 30–30, 28–31, 24–24, 24–23
Pts: World B. Free 25; Rebs: Roy Hinson 6 Asts: World B. Free 7	Pts: Larry Bird 30; Rebs: Bird, Parish 11 each Asts: Larry Bird 7
Boston leads series, 2–0

Boston Garden, Boston, Massachusetts
Attendance: 14,890
Referees: Jake O'Donnell, Ed Middleton

April 23

Boxscore

Boston Celtics 98, Cleveland Cavaliers 105
Scoring by quarter: 24–25, 21–30, 21–21, 32–29
Pts: Scott Wedman 30; Rebs: Kevin McHale 11; Asts: Dennis Johnson 10	Pts: World B. Free 32; Rebs: Roy Hinson 9 Asts: John Bagley 15
Boston leads series, 2–1

Richfield Coliseum, Richfield, Ohio
Attendance: 20,900
Referees: Tom Nunez, Jess Kersey

April 25

Boxscore

Boston Celtics 117, Cleveland Cavaliers 115
Scoring by quarter: 32–33, 31–33, 31–23, 23–26
Pts: Larry Bird 34; Rebs: Larry Bird 14; Asts: Larry Bird 7	Pts: World B. Free 30; Rebs: Lonnie Shelton 8 Asts: John Bagley 10
Boston wins series, 3–1

Richfield Coliseum, Richfield, Ohio
Attendance: 20,900
Referees: Ed T. Rush, Hue Hollins

- Dennis Johnson blocks a World B. Free 3 with 2 seconds left.

Regular-season series
Boston won 6–0 in the regular-season series

December 1, 1984

Recap

Boston Celtics 110, Cleveland Cavaliers 104

The Coliseum, Richfield, Ohio

December 2, 1984

Recap

Cleveland Cavaliers 99, Boston Celtics 122

Boston Garden, Boston

February 6, 1985

Recap

Cleveland Cavaliers 108, Boston Celtics 113

Boston Garden, Boston

March 15, 1985

Recap

Boston Celtics 119, Cleveland Cavaliers 96

The Coliseum, Richfield, Ohio

March 22, 1985

Recap

Cleveland Cavaliers 117, Boston Celtics 129

Boston Garden, Boston

April 11, 1985

Recap

Boston Celtics 121, Cleveland Cavaliers 115

The Coliseum, Richfield, Ohio

This was the second playoff meeting between these two teams, with the Celtics winning the first meeting.

Previous playoff series
Boston leads 1–0 in all-time playoff series

1976

Boston Celtics 4, Cleveland Cavaliers 2

1976 Eastern Conference Finals

==== (2) Milwaukee Bucks vs. (7) Chicago Bulls ====
April 19

Boxscore

Chicago Bulls 100, Milwaukee Bucks 109
Scoring by quarter: 30–31, 24–27, 19–22, 27–29
Pts: Quintin Dailey 25; Rebs: David Greenwood 13; Asts: Michael Jordan 10	Pts: Sidney Moncrief 30; Rebs: Paul Mokeski 10; Asts: Paul Pressey 9
Milwaukee leads series, 1–0

MECCA Arena, Milwaukee, Wisconsin
Attendance: 11,052
Referees: Hugh Evans, Mike Mathis

April 21

Boxscore

Chicago Bulls 115, Milwaukee Bucks 122
Scoring by quarter: 31–30, 22–29, 32–29, 30–34
Pts: Michael Jordan 30; Rebs: Jawann Oldham 9 Asts: Michael Jordan 12	Pts: Terry Cummings 30; Rebs: Terry Cummings 9 Asts: Terry Cummings 11
Milwaukee leads series, 2–0

MECCA Arena, Milwaukee, Wisconsin
Attendance: 11,052
Referees: Joe Crawford, Ed T. Rush

April 24

Boxscore

Milwaukee Bucks 107, Chicago Bulls 109
Scoring by quarter: 31–29, 24–29, 26–24, 26–27
Pts: Terry Cummings 37; Rebs: Terry Cummings 9 Asts: Moncrief, Pressey 5 each	Pts: Michael Jordan 35; Rebs: Sidney Green 9 Asts: Michael Jordan 7
Milwaukee leads series, 2–1

Chicago Stadium, Chicago, Illinois
Attendance: 17,225
Referees: Hue Hollins, Jess Kersey

- Michael Jordan hits his first playoff game-winner with 22 seconds left.

April 26

Boxscore

Milwaukee Bucks 105, Chicago Bulls 97
Scoring by quarter: 27–27, 28–18, 28–25, 22–27
Pts: Terry Cummings 29; Rebs: Terry Cummings 12; Asts: Paul Pressey 4	Pts: Michael Jordan 29; Rebs: Dave Corzine 9 Asts: Michael Jordan 5
Milwaukee wins series, 3–1

Chicago Stadium, Chicago, Illinois
Attendance: 17,787
Referees: Darell Garretson, Tommy Nunez Sr.

Regular-season series
Tied 3–3 in the regular-season series

October 27, 1984

Recap

Chicago Bulls 106, Milwaukee Bucks 108

MECCA Arena, Milwaukee

October 29, 1984

Recap

Milwaukee Bucks 110, Chicago Bulls 116

Chicago Stadium, Chicago

November 21, 1984

Recap

Chicago Bulls 98, Milwaukee Bucks 108

MECCA Arena, Milwaukee

January 4, 1985

Recap

Milwaukee Bucks 101, Chicago Bulls 106

Chicago Stadium, Chicago

February 17, 1985

Recap

Chicago Bulls 105, Milwaukee Bucks 125

MECCA Arena, Milwaukee

March 17, 1985

Recap

Milwaukee Bucks 117, Chicago Bulls 119 (OT)

Chicago Stadium, Chicago

This was the second playoff meeting between these two teams, with the Bucks winning the first meeting.

Previous playoff series
Milwaukee leads 1–0 in all-time playoff series

1974

Chicago Bulls 0, Milwaukee Bucks 4

1974 Western Conference Finals

==== (3) Philadelphia 76ers vs. (6) Washington Bullets ====
April 17

Boxscore

Washington Bullets 97, Philadelphia 76ers 104
Scoring by quarter: 21–28, 27–27, 28–21, 21–28
Pts: Cliff Robinson 24; Rebs: Jeff Ruland 10; Asts: Gus Williams 8	Pts: Moses Malone 26; Rebs: Charles Barkley 12; Asts: Maurice Cheeks 6
Philadelphia leads series, 1–0

Spectrum, Philadelphia, Pennsylvania
Attendance: 7,170
Referees: Jake O'Donnell, Paul Mihalak

April 21

Boxscore

Washington Bullets 94, Philadelphia 76ers 113
Scoring by quarter: 27–26, 25–30, 19–25, 23–32
Pts: Jeff Malone 30; Rebs: Cliff Robinson 11; Asts: Darren Daye 9	Pts: Andrew Toney 31; Rebs: Malone, Barkley 14 each Asts: Maurice Cheeks 5
Philadelphia leads series, 2–0

Spectrum, Philadelphia, Pennsylvania
Attendance: 9,612
Referees: Mike Mathis, Hugh Evans

April 24

Boxscore

Philadelphia 76ers 100, Washington Bullets 118
Scoring by quarter: 35–28, 20–32, 13–30, 32–28
Pts: Moses Malone 17; Rebs: Charles Barkley 11; Asts: Andrew Toney 5	Pts: Gus Williams 28; Rebs: three players 7 each Asts: Ruland, Johnson 5 each
Philadelphia leads series, 2–1

Capital Centre, Landover, Maryland
Attendance: 11,103
Referees: John Vanak, James Capers Sr.

April 26

Boxscore

Philadelphia 76ers 106, Washington Bullets 98
Scoring by quarter: 27–24, 34–23, 13–21, 32–30
Pts: Julius Erving 25; Rebs: Charles Barkley 14; Asts: Clint Richardson 4	Pts: Jeff Malone 24; Rebs: Jeff Ruland 10; Asts: Jeff Ruland 7
Philadelphia wins series, 3–1

Capital Centre, Landover, Maryland
Attendance: 12,238
Referees: Jess Kersey, Bill Oakes

Regular-season series
Philadelphia won 4–2 in the regular-season series

November 20, 1984

Recap

Washington Bullets 120, Philadelphia 76ers 105

Spectrum, Philadelphia

November 27, 1984

Recap

Philadelphia 76ers 93, Washington Bullets 89

Capital Centre, Landover, Maryland

January 13, 1985

Recap

Philadelphia 76ers 115, Washington Bullets 104

Capital Centre, Landover, Maryland

February 6, 1985

Recap

Washington Bullets 111, Philadelphia 76ers 116

Spectrum, Philadelphia

March 27, 1985

Recap

Washington Bullets 97, Philadelphia 76ers 115

Spectrum, Philadelphia

April 13, 1985

Recap

Philadelphia 76ers 106, Washington Bullets 118

Capital Centre, Landover, Maryland

This was the fourth playoff meeting between these two teams, with the Bullets winning two of the first three meetings.

Previous playoff series
Washington leads 2–1 in all-time playoff series

1971

Philadelphia 76ers 3, Baltimore Bullets 4

1971 Eastern Conference Semifinals

1978

Philadelphia 76ers 2, Washington Bullets 4

1978 Eastern Conference Finals

1980

Philadelphia 76ers 2, Washington Bullets 0

1980 Eastern Conference First Round

==== (4) Detroit Pistons vs. (5) New Jersey Nets ====
April 18

Boxscore

New Jersey Nets 105, Detroit Pistons 125
Scoring by quarter: 26–39, 19–25, 28–29, 32–32
Pts: Buck Williams 23; Rebs: Buck Williams 9 Asts: Micheal Ray Richardson 10	Pts: Bill Laimbeer 23; Rebs: Bill Laimbeer 13; Asts: Isiah Thomas 11
Detroit leads series, 1–0

Joe Louis Arena, Detroit, Michigan
Attendance: 10,465
Referees: John Vanak, Hue Hollins

April 21

Boxscore

New Jersey Nets 111, Detroit Pistons 121
Scoring by quarter: 32–32, 27–32, 31–23, 21–34
Pts: Buck Williams 23; Rebs: Buck Williams 11; Asts: Micheal Ray Richardson 14	Pts: Isiah Thomas 29; Rebs: Bill Laimbeer 12; Asts: Isiah Thomas 14
Detroit leads series, 2–0

Joe Louis Arena, Detroit, Michigan
Attendance: 11,501
Referees: Jake O'Donnell, Lee Jones

April 24

Boxscore

Detroit Pistons 116, New Jersey Nets 115
Scoring by quarter: 22–33, 36–30, 26–28, 32–24
Pts: Terry Tyler 23; Rebs: Tripucka, Tyler 11 each Asts: Isiah Thomas 11	Pts: Williams, King 28 each Rebs: Buck Williams 12; Asts: Micheal Ray Richardson 10
Detroit wins series, 3–0

Brendan Byrne Arena, East Rutherford, New Jersey
Attendance: 9,999
Referees: Ed T. Rush, Ed Middleton

Regular-season series
New Jersey won 5–1 in the regular-season series

December 26, 1984

Recap

Detroit Pistons 97, New Jersey Nets 112

Brendan Byrne Arena, East Rutherford, New Jersey

December 29, 1984

Recap

New Jersey Nets 110, Detroit Pistons 108

Pontiac Silverdome, Pontiac, Michigan

January 19, 1985

Recap

Detroit Pistons 109, New Jersey Nets 107

Brendan Byrne Arena, East Rutherford, New Jersey

February 5, 1985

Recap

New Jersey Nets 119, Detroit Pistons 117

Pontiac Silverdome, Pontiac, Michigan

February 15, 1985

Recap

Detroit Pistons 123, New Jersey Nets 124

Brendan Byrne Arena, East Rutherford, New Jersey

February 23, 1985

Recap

New Jersey Nets 111, Detroit Pistons 103

Pontiac Silverdome, Pontiac, Michigan

This was the first playoff meeting between the Nets and the Pistons.

=== Western Conference first round ===
==== (1) Los Angeles Lakers vs. (8) Phoenix Suns ====
April 18

Boxscore

Phoenix Suns 114, Los Angeles Lakers 142
Scoring by quarter: 24–45, 27–32, 35–36, 28–29
Pts: Charles Pittman 22; Rebs: Maurice Lucas 11; Asts: Jay Humphries 8	Pts: Mike McGee 22; Rebs: Cooper, McAdoo 6 each Asts: Magic Johnson 19
LA Lakers lead series, 1–0

The Forum, Inglewood, California
Attendance: 15,547
Referees: Jess Kersey, Bill Oakes

April 20

Boxscore

Phoenix Suns 130, Los Angeles Lakers 147
Scoring by quarter: 31–42, 34–33, 25–35, 40–37
Pts: Alvan Adams 23; Rebs: Maurice Lucas 9 Asts: Maurice Lucas 6	Pts: Kareem Abdul-Jabbar 24; Rebs: Kurt Rambis 7 Asts: Cooper, Johnson 12 each
LA Lakers lead series, 2–0

The Forum, Inglewood, California
Attendance: 15,261
Referees: Darrell Garretson, Dick Bavetta

April 23

Boxscore

Los Angeles Lakers 119, Phoenix Suns 103
Scoring by quarter: 25–25, 43–30, 18–22, 33–26
Pts: James Worthy 23; Rebs: Kurt Rambis 9 Asts: Magic Johnson 11	Pts: Maurice Lucas 26; Rebs: Maurice Lucas 13; Asts: Adams, Holton 5 each
LA Lakers win series, 3–0

Arizona Veterans Memorial Coliseum, Phoenix, Arizona
Attendance: 8,741
Referees: Hugh Evans, Wally Rooney

Regular-season series
Los Angeles won 5–1 in the regular-season series

November 20, 1984

Recap

Phoenix Suns 108, Los Angeles Lakers 130

The Forum, Inglewood, California

November 21, 1984

Recap

Los Angeles Lakers 102, Phoenix Suns 97

Arizona Veterans Memorial Coliseum, Phoenix, Arizona

December 21, 1984

Recap

Phoenix Suns 105, Los Angeles Lakers 119

The Forum, Inglewood, California

February 28, 1985

Recap

Los Angeles Lakers 105, Phoenix Suns 117

Arizona Veterans Memorial Coliseum, Phoenix, Arizona

March 19, 1985

Recap

Los Angeles Lakers 130, Phoenix Suns 112

Arizona Veterans Memorial Coliseum, Phoenix, Arizona

March 31, 1985

Recap

Phoenix Suns 98, Los Angeles Lakers 123

The Forum, Inglewood, California

This was the fifth playoff meeting between these two teams, with the Lakers winning the first four meetings.

Previous playoff series
Los Angeles leads 4–0 in all-time playoff series

1970

Los Angeles Lakers 4, Phoenix Suns 3

1970 Western Division Semifinals

1980

Los Angeles Lakers 4, Phoenix Suns 1

1980 Western Conference Semifinals

1982

Los Angeles Lakers 4, Phoenix Suns 0

1982 Western Conference Semifinals

1984

Los Angeles Lakers 4, Phoenix Suns 2

1984 Western Conference Finals

==== (2) Denver Nuggets vs. (7) San Antonio Spurs ====
April 18

Boxscore

San Antonio Spurs 111, Denver Nuggets 141
Scoring by quarter: 24–35, 27–33, 32–36, 28–37
Pts: Mike Mitchell 23; Rebs: Ozell Jones 8 Asts: Johnny Moore 5	Pts: Alex English 33; Rebs: Elston Turner 8 Asts: Fat Lever 11
Denver leads series, 1–0

McNichols Sports Arena, Denver, Colorado
Attendance: 12,128
Referees: Ed T. Rush, Bill Saar

April 20

Boxscore

San Antonio Spurs 113, Denver Nuggets 111
Scoring by quarter: 31–31, 28–25, 29–29, 25–26
Pts: George Gervin 41; Rebs: Artis Gilmore 12; Asts: Johnny Moore 8	Pts: Alex English 29; Rebs: Wayne Cooper 10; Asts: Fat Lever 13
Series tied, 1–1

McNichols Sports Arena, Denver, Colorado
Attendance: 17,022
Referees: Jess Kersey, Lee Jones

April 23

Boxscore

Denver Nuggets 115, San Antonio Spurs 112
Scoring by quarter: 32–29, 28–22, 34–28, 21–33
Pts: Alex English 27; Rebs: Calvin Natt 8 Asts: Calvin Natt 8	Pts: George Gervin 30; Rebs: Artis Gilmore 14; Asts: Johnny Moore 9
Denver leads series, 2–1

HemisFair Arena, San Antonio, Texas
Attendance: 8,799
Referees: Darell Garretson, Joe Crawford

April 26

Boxscore

Denver Nuggets 111, San Antonio Spurs 116
Scoring by quarter: 22–32, 29–26, 31–27, 29–31
Pts: Alex English 27; Rebs: Alex English 8 Asts: Fat Lever 7	Pts: Mike Mitchell 37; Rebs: Artis Gilmore 13; Asts: Johnny Moore 16
Series tied, 2–2

HemisFair Arena, San Antonio, Texas
Attendance: 8,621
Referees: Earl Strom, Mike Mathis

April 28

Boxscore

San Antonio Spurs 99, Denver Nuggets 126
Scoring by quarter: 24–31, 21–34, 24–32, 30–29
Pts: Artis Gilmore 19; Rebs: Gilmore, Iavaroni 8 each Asts: Johnny Moore 4	Pts: Alex English 33; Rebs: Calvin Natt 10; Asts: Fat Lever 10
Denver wins series, 3–2

McNichols Sports Arena, Denver, Colorado
Attendance: 17,022
Referees: John Vanak, Ed T. Rush

Regular-season series
Tied 3–3 in the regular-season series

October 30, 1984

Recap

Denver Nuggets 118, San Antonio Spurs 126

HemisFair Arena, San Antonio

December 12, 1984

Recap

Denver Nuggets 105, San Antonio Spurs 126

HemisFair Arena, San Antonio

December 26, 1984

Recap

San Antonio Spurs 119, Denver Nuggets 130

McNichols Sports Arena, Denver, Colorado

February 15, 1985

Recap

San Antonio Spurs 119, Denver Nuggets 129

McNichols Sports Arena, Denver, Colorado

March 17, 1985

Recap

Denver Nuggets 119, San Antonio Spurs 124

HemisFair Arena, San Antonio

April 5, 1985

Recap

San Antonio Spurs 109, Denver Nuggets 118

McNichols Sports Arena, Denver, Colorado

This was the second playoff meeting between these two teams, with the Spurs winning the first meeting.

Previous playoff series
San Antonio leads 1–0 in all-time playoff series

1983

Denver Nuggets 1, San Antonio Spurs 4

1983 Western Conference Semifinals

==== (3) Houston Rockets vs. (6) Utah Jazz ====
April 19

Boxscore

Utah Jazz 115, Houston Rockets 101
Scoring by quarter: 28–28, 32–15, 21–33, 34–25
Pts: Adrian Dantley 34; Rebs: Thurl Bailey 10; Asts: Rickey Green 10	Pts: Ralph Sampson 26; Rebs: Ralph Sampson 24; Asts: Lionel Hollins 7
Utah leads series, 1–0

The Summit, Houston, Texas
Attendance: 13,185
Referees: Ed Rush, Joe Crawford

April 21

Boxscore

Utah Jazz 96, Houston Rockets 122
Scoring by quarter: 25–29, 18–34, 29–26, 24–33
Pts: Jeff Wilkins 22; Rebs: Jeff Wilkins 12; Asts: Green, Stockton 6 each	Pts: Lewis Lloyd 27; Rebs: Ralph Sampson 14; Asts: Lloyd, Lucas 6 each
Series tied, 1–1

The Summit, Houston, Texas
Attendance: 14,139
Referees: John Vanak, Wally Rooney

April 24

Boxscore

Houston Rockets 104, Utah Jazz 112
Scoring by quarter: 23–24, 26–27, 33–29, 22–32
Pts: Hakeem Olajuwon 26; Rebs: Hakeem Olajuwon 16; Asts: John Lucas 7	Pts: Adrian Dantley 29; Rebs: Bailey, Wilkins 11 each Asts: Rickey Green 10
Utah leads series, 2–1

Salt Palace, Salt Lake City, Utah
Attendance: 12,316
Referees: Earl Strom, Mike Mathis

April 26

Boxscore

Houston Rockets 96, Utah Jazz 94
Scoring by quarter: 19–24, 19–25, 29–19, 29–26
Pts: Sampson, Olajuwon 18 each Rebs: Ralph Sampson 18; Asts: John Lucas 5	Pts: Rickey Green 22; Rebs: Thurl Bailey 12; Asts: Rickey Green 11
Series tied, 2–2

Salt Palace, Salt Lake City, Utah
Attendance: 12,690
Referees: Jake O'Donnell, Joe Crawford

April 28

Boxscore

Utah Jazz 104, Houston Rockets 97
Scoring by quarter: 20–26, 19-18, 28–32, 37–21
Pts: Adrian Dantley 25; Rebs: Mark Eaton 10; Asts: Rickey Green 6	Pts: Hakeem Olajuwon 32; Rebs: Hakeem Olajuwon 14; Asts: John Lucas 8
Utah wins series, 3–2

The Summit, Houston, Texas
Attendance: 16,016
Referees: Darrell Garretson, Hugh Evans

Regular-season series
Tied 3–3 in the regular-season series

November 23, 1984

Recap

Houston Rockets 98, Utah Jazz 111

Salt Palace Acord Arena, Salt Lake City

January 6, 1985

Recap

Houston Rockets 92, Utah Jazz 121

Salt Palace Acord Arena, Salt Lake City

January 19, 1985

Recap

Utah Jazz 95, Houston Rockets 120

The Summit, Houston

March 1, 1985

Recap

Houston Rockets 119, Utah Jazz 115

Salt Palace Acord Arena, Salt Lake City

March 6, 1985

Recap

Utah Jazz 94, Houston Rockets 90

The Summit, Houston

March 30, 1985

Recap

Utah Jazz 96, Houston Rockets 106

The Summit, Houston

This was the first playoff meeting between the Jazz and the Rockets.

==== (4) Dallas Mavericks vs. (5) Portland Trail Blazers ====
April 18

Boxscore

Portland Trail Blazers 131, Dallas Mavericks 139 (2OT)
Scoring by quarter: 24–23, 33–25, 28–40, 27–24, Overtime: 9–9, 10–18
Pts: Kiki VanDeWeghe 25; Rebs: Sam Bowie 14; Asts: Darnell Valentine 13	Pts: Rolando Blackman 43; Rebs: Mark Aguirre 14; Asts: Rolando Blackman 6
Dallas leads series, 1–0

Reunion Arena, Dallas, Texas
Attendance: 17,007
Referees: Lee Jones, Darell Garretson

April 20

Boxscore

Portland Trail Blazers 124, Dallas Mavericks 121 (OT)
Scoring by quarter: 15–25, 28–20, 35–32, 32–33, Overtime: 14–11
Pts: Kiki VanDeWeghe 27; Rebs: Sam Bowie 20; Asts: Clyde Drexler 12	Pts: Rolando Blackman 41; Rebs: Sam Perkins 19; Asts: Derek Harper 8
Series tied, 1–1

Reunion Arena, Dallas, Texas
Attendance: 17,007
Referees: John Vanak, Hue Hollins

April 23

Boxscore

Dallas Mavericks 109, Portland Trail Blazers 122
Scoring by quarter: 28–31, 34–25, 25–35, 22–31
Pts: Blackman, Aguirre 30 each Rebs: Perkins, Vincent 9 each Asts: Brad Davis 5	Pts: Kiki VanDeWeghe 24; Rebs: Sam Bowie 11; Asts: Clyde Drexler 10
Portland leads series, 2–1

Memorial Coliseum, Portland, Oregon
Attendance: 12,666
Referees: Jake O'Donnell, Paul Mihalak

April 25

Boxscore

Dallas Mavericks 113, Portland Trail Blazers 115
Scoring by quarter: 26–25, 31–30, 28–33, 28–27
Pts: Mark Aguirre 39; Rebs: Sam Perkins 10; Asts: Brad Davis 8	Pts: Kiki VanDeWeghe 27; Rebs: Kenny Carr 10; Asts: Darnell Valentine 9
Portland wins series, 3–1

Memorial Coliseum, Portland, Oregon
Attendance: 12,666
Referees: Hugh Evans, Wally Rooney

Regular-season series
Dallas won 4–1 in the regular-season series

November 13, 1984

Recap

Dallas Mavericks 101, Portland Trail Blazers 94

Memorial Coliseum, Portland, Oregon

January 8, 1985

Recap

Dallas Mavericks 108, Portland Trail Blazers 102

Memorial Coliseum, Portland, Oregon

January 13, 1985

Recap

Portland Trail Blazers 101, Dallas Mavericks 124

Reunion Arena, Dallas

February 20, 1985

Recap

Portland Trail Blazers 98, Dallas Mavericks 104

Reunion Arena, Dallas

April 12, 1985

Recap

Dallas Mavericks 111, Portland Trail Blazers 131

Memorial Coliseum, Portland, Oregon

This was the first playoff meeting between the Mavericks and the Trail Blazers.

== Conference semifinals ==
=== Eastern Conference semifinals ===
==== (1) Boston Celtics vs. (4) Detroit Pistons ====
April 28

Boxscore

Detroit Pistons 99, Boston Celtics 133
Scoring by quarter: 29–35, 24–29, 20–37, 26–32
Pts: Isiah Thomas 23; Rebs: three players 5 each Asts: Isiah Thomas 8	Pts: Robert Parish 27; Rebs: Robert Parish 16; Asts: Ainge, Williams 7 each
Boston leads series, 1–0

Boston Garden, Boston, Massachusetts
Attendance: 14,890
Referees: Earl Strom, Paul Mihalak

April 30

Boxscore

Detroit Pistons 114, Boston Celtics 121
Scoring by quarter: 36–32, 17–27, 28–27, 33–35
Pts: Isiah Thomas 28; Rebs: Thomas, Laimbeer 9 each Asts: Isiah Thomas 15	Pts: Larry Bird 42; Rebs: McHale, Bird 10 each Asts: Dennis Johnson 7
Boston leads series, 2–0

Boston Garden, Boston, Massachusetts
Attendance: 14,890
Referees: Hugh Evans, Tom Nunez

May 2

Boxscore

Boston Celtics 117, Detroit Pistons 125
Scoring by quarter: 34–38, 28–24, 34–36, 21–27
Pts: Dennis Johnson 27; Rebs: Larry Bird 13; Asts: Larry Bird 8	Pts: Bill Laimbeer 27; Rebs: Bill Laimbeer 13; Asts: Isiah Thomas 16
Boston leads series, 2–1

Joe Louis Arena, Detroit, Michigan
Attendance: 14,209
Referees: Jess Kersey, Mike Mathis

May 5

Boxscore

Boston Celtics 99, Detroit Pistons 102
Scoring by quarter: 23–26, 30–28, 34–22, 12–26
Pts: Kevin McHale 24; Rebs: Kevin McHale 10; Asts: Larry Bird 7	Pts: Vinnie Johnson 34; Rebs: Bill Laimbeer 12; Asts: Isiah Thomas 10
Series tied, 2–2

Joe Louis Arena, Detroit, Michigan
Attendance: 14,350
Referees: Lee Jones, Darell Garretson

May 8

Boxscore

Detroit Pistons 123, Boston Celtics 130
Scoring by quarter: 33–38, 34–30, 23–27, 33–35
Pts: Vinnie Johnson 30; Rebs: Bill Laimbeer 13; Asts: Isiah Thomas 7	Pts: Larry Bird 43; Rebs: Larry Bird 13; Asts: D. Johnson, Ainge 6 each
Boston leads series, 3–2

Boston Garden, Boston, Massachusetts
Attendance: 14,890
Referees: Jake O'Donnell, Wally Rooney

May 10

Boxscore

Boston Celtics 123, Detroit Pistons 113
Scoring by quarter: 36–31, 27–21, 29–34, 31–27
Pts: Dennis Johnson 22; Rebs: Robert Parish 13; Asts: Danny Ainge 9	Pts: Isiah Thomas 37; Rebs: Bill Laimbeer 13; Asts: Isiah Thomas 9
Boston wins series, 4–2

Joe Louis Arena, Detroit, Michigan
Attendance: 21,193
Referees: John Vanak, Ed T. Rush

Regular-season series
Boston won 4–2 in the regular-season series

October 26, 1984

Recap

Boston Celtics 130, Detroit Pistons 123

Pontiac Silverdome, Pontiac, Michigan

November 2, 1984

Recap

Detroit Pistons 116, Boston Celtics 127

Boston Garden, Boston

December 4, 1984

Recap

Boston Celtics 99, Detroit Pistons 104

Pontiac Silverdome, Pontiac, Michigan

January 29, 1985

Recap

Detroit Pistons 130, Boston Celtics 131

Hartford Civic Center, Hartford, Connecticut

March 3, 1985

Recap

Detroit Pistons 129, Boston Celtics 138

Boston Garden, Boston

March 31, 1985

Recap

Boston Celtics 105, Detroit Pistons 113

Joe Louis Arena, Detroit, Michigan

This was the second playoff meeting between these two teams, with the Celtics winning the first meeting.

Previous playoff series
Boston leads 1–0 in all-time playoff series

1968

Boston Celtics 4, Detroit Pistons 2

1968 Eastern Division Semifinals

==== (2) Milwaukee Bucks vs. (3) Philadelphia 76ers ====
April 28

Boxscore

Philadelphia 76ers 127, Milwaukee Bucks 105
Scoring by quarter: 37–24, 29–27, 28–23, 33–31
Pts: Moses Malone 27; Rebs: Charles Barkley 8 Asts: Maurice Cheeks 9	Pts: Terry Cummings 17; Rebs: Paul Pressey 10; Asts: Hodges, Pressey 8 each
Philadelphia leads series, 1–0

MECCA Arena, Milwaukee, Wisconsin
Attendance: 11,052
Referees: Jake O'Donnell, Wally Rooney

April 30

Boxscore

Philadelphia 76ers 112, Milwaukee Bucks 108
Scoring by quarter: 25–31, 29–22, 28–25, 30–30
Pts: Moses Malone 25; Rebs: Julius Erving 10; Asts: Maurice Cheeks 9	Pts: Terry Cummings 41; Rebs: Cummings, Lister 12 each Asts: Paul Pressey 16
Philadelphia leads series, 2–0

MECCA Arena, Milwaukee, Wisconsin
Attendance: 11,052
Referees: Earl Strom, Ed Middleton

May 3

Boxscore

Milwaukee Bucks 104, Philadelphia 76ers 109
Scoring by quarter: 23–34, 20–23, 34–28, 27–24
Pts: Terry Cummings 21; Rebs: Cummings, Lister 8 each Asts: Paul Pressey 7	Pts: Andrew Toney 20; Rebs: Moses Malone 13; Asts: Toney, Cheeks 7 each
Philadelphia leads series, 3–0

Spectrum, Philadelphia, Pennsylvania
Attendance: 14,188
Referees: Darell Garretson, Joe Crawford

May 5

Boxscore

Milwaukee Bucks 112, Philadelphia 76ers 121
Scoring by quarter: 24–30, 27–22, 26–31, 35–38
Pts: Moncrief, Pressey 25 each Rebs: Alton Lister 14; Asts: Sidney Moncrief 8	Pts: Moses Malone 31; Rebs: Moses Malone 13; Asts: Andrew Toney 11
Philadelphia wins series, 4–0

Spectrum, Philadelphia, Pennsylvania
Attendance: 15,264
Referees: John Vanak, Hue Hollins

Regular-season series
Tied 3–3 in the regular-season series

December 5, 1984

Recap

Milwaukee Bucks 111, Philadelphia 76ers 112

Spectrum, Philadelphia

December 14, 1984

Recap

Philadelphia 76ers 115, Milwaukee Bucks 111

MECCA Arena, Milwaukee

December 21, 1984

Recap

Milwaukee Bucks 104, Philadelphia 76ers 101

Spectrum, Philadelphia

January 5, 1985

Recap

Philadelphia 76ers 110, Milwaukee Bucks 106

MECCA Arena, Milwaukee

February 26, 1985

Recap

Philadelphia 76ers 97, Milwaukee Bucks 116

MECCA Arena, Milwaukee

March 22, 1985

Recap

Milwaukee Bucks 131, Philadelphia 76ers 112

Spectrum, Philadelphia

This was the fifth playoff meeting between these two teams, with the 76ers winning three of the first four meetings.

Previous playoff series
Philadelphia leads 3–1 in all-time playoff series

1970

Milwaukee Bucks 4, Philadelphia 76ers 1

1970 Eastern Division Semifinals

1981

Milwaukee Bucks 3, Philadelphia 76ers 4

1981 Eastern Conference Semifinals

1982

Milwaukee Bucks 2, Philadelphia 76ers 4

1982 Eastern Conference Semifinals

1983

Milwaukee Bucks 1, Philadelphia 76ers 4

1983 Eastern Conference Finals

=== Western Conference semifinals ===
==== (1) Los Angeles Lakers vs. (5) Portland Trail Blazers ====
April 27

Boxscore

Portland Trail Blazers 101, Los Angeles Lakers 125
Scoring by quarter: 24–33, 21–40, 27–28, 29–24
Pts: Steve Colter 26; Rebs: Kenny Carr 10; Asts: Steve Colter 8	Pts: Byron Scott 20; Rebs: Kurt Rambis 14; Asts: Magic Johnson 12
LA Lakers lead series, 1–0

The Forum, Inglewood, California
Attendance: 13,909
Referees: Ed T. Rush, Lee Jones

- The CBS coverage of this game would mark the final on-air assignment for Frank Glieber (calling the game alongside James Brown); as Glieber died from a heart attack three days later at the age of 51.

April 30

Boxscore

Portland Trail Blazers 118, Los Angeles Lakers 134
Scoring by quarter: 32–39, 20–30, 33–32, 33–33
Pts: Kiki VanDeWeghe 23; Rebs: Kenny Carr 12; Asts: Darnell Valentine 9	Pts: Byron Scott 31; Rebs: Magic Johnson 9 Asts: Magic Johnson 18
LA Lakers lead series, 2–0

The Forum, Inglewood, California
Attendance: 17,505
Referees: Hue Hollins, John Vanak

May 3

Boxscore

Los Angeles Lakers 130, Portland Trail Blazers 126
Scoring by quarter: 35–32, 37–24, 32–36, 26–34
Pts: James Worthy 28; Rebs: Abdul-Jabbar, McAdoo 9 each Asts: Magic Johnson 23	Pts: Kiki VanDeWeghe 27; Rebs: Clyde Drexler 11; Asts: Clyde Drexler 14
LA Lakers lead series, 3–0

Memorial Coliseum, Portland, Oregon
Attendance: 12,666
Referees: Jake O'Donnell, Wally Rooney

May 5

Boxscore

Los Angeles Lakers 107, Portland Trail Blazers 115
Scoring by quarter: 30–23, 19–36, 25–27, 33–29
Pts: Magic Johnson 31; Rebs: Kareem Abdul-Jabbar 17; Asts: Magic Johnson 13	Pts: VanDeWeghe, Thompson 17 each Rebs: Mychal Thompson 10; Asts: Clyde Drexler 10
LA Lakers lead series, 3–1

Memorial Coliseum, Portland, Oregon
Attendance: 12,666
Referees: Earl Strom, Mike Mathis

May 7

Boxscore

Portland Trail Blazers 120, Los Angeles Lakers 139
Scoring by quarter: 32–33, 27–35, 24–32, 37–39
Pts: Jerome Kersey 18; Rebs: Kenny Carr 11; Asts: Clyde Drexler 12	Pts: Magic Johnson 34; Rebs: Magic Johnson 9 Asts: Magic Johnson 19
LA Lakers win series, 4–1

The Forum, Inglewood, California
Attendance: 17,505
Referees: Hugh Evans, Joe Crawford

Regular-season series
Los Angeles won 5–1 in the regular-season series

November 4, 1984

Recap

Portland Trail Blazers 116, Los Angeles Lakers 124

The Forum, Inglewood, California

November 9, 1984

Recap

Los Angeles Lakers 130, Portland Trail Blazers 126

Memorial Coliseum, Portland, Oregon

January 4, 1985

Recap

Portland Trail Blazers 95, Los Angeles Lakers 120

The Forum, Inglewood, California

January 29, 1985

Recap

Los Angeles Lakers 122, Portland Trail Blazers 106

Memorial Coliseum, Portland, Oregon

March 26, 1985

Recap

Los Angeles Lakers 113, Portland Trail Blazers 116 (OT)

Memorial Coliseum, Portland, Oregon

April 7, 1985

Recap

Portland Trail Blazers 133, Los Angeles Lakers 135 (OT)

The Forum, Inglewood, California

This was the third playoff meeting between these two teams, with each team winning one series apiece.

Previous playoff series
Tied 1–1 in all-time playoff series

1977

Los Angeles Lakers 0, Portland Trail Blazers 4

1977 Western Conference Finals

1983

Los Angeles Lakers 4, Portland Trail Blazers 1

1983 Western Conference Semifinals

==== (2) Denver Nuggets vs. (6) Utah Jazz ====
April 30

Boxscore

Utah Jazz 113, Denver Nuggets 130
Scoring by quarter: 39–36, 27–37, 23–32, 24–25
Pts: Adrian Dantley 28; Rebs: Dantley, Kelley 9 each Asts: Rickey Green 6	Pts: Alex English 31; Rebs: Fat Lever 16; Asts: Fat Lever 18
Denver leads series, 1–0

McNichols Sports Arena, Denver, Colorado
Attendance: 11,918
Referees: Lee Jones, Jess Kersey

May 2

Boxscore

Utah Jazz 123, Denver Nuggets 131 (OT)
Scoring by quarter: 34–32, 32–38, 32–24, 21–25, Overtime: 4–12
Pts: Rickey Green 25; Rebs: Adrian Dantley 14; Asts: Rickey Green 10	Pts: Alex English 26; Rebs: Fat Lever 13; Asts: Alex English 12
Denver leads series, 2–0

McNichols Sports Arena, Denver, Colorado
Attendance: 16,317
Referees: Jake O'Donnell, Bill Oakes

May 4

Boxscore

Denver Nuggets 123, Utah Jazz 131
Scoring by quarter: 27–37, 34–30, 38–32, 24–32
Pts: Calvin Natt 30; Rebs: Mike Evans 8 Asts: English, Lever 5 each	Pts: Adrian Dantley 32; Rebs: Thurl Bailey 14; Asts: Rickey Green 7
Denver leads series, 2–1

Salt Palace, Salt Lake City, Utah
Attendance: 12,178
Referees: Ed T. Rush, Mike Mathis

May 5

Boxscore

Denver Nuggets 125, Utah Jazz 118
Scoring by quarter: 36–26, 33–29, 29–33, 27–30
Pts: Alex English 40; Rebs: Wayne Cooper 14; Asts: Calvin Natt 10	Pts: Adrian Dantley 33; Rebs: Rich Kelley 8 Asts: John Stockton 10
Denver leads series, 3–1

Salt Palace, Salt Lake City, Utah
Attendance: 12,716
Referees: Joe Crawford, Hugh Evans

May 7

Boxscore

Utah Jazz 104, Denver Nuggets 116
Scoring by quarter: 23–43, 22–28, 34–26, 25–19
Pts: Rickey Green 22; Rebs: Rich Kelley 11; Asts: Rickey Green 7	Pts: Alex English 30; Rebs: Wayne Cooper 11; Asts: Alex English 6
Denver wins series, 4–1

McNichols Sports Arena, Denver, Colorado
Attendance: 17,022
Referees: Earl Strom, Hue Hollins

Regular-season series
Denver won 4–2 in the regular-season series

November 10, 1984

Recap

Utah Jazz 135, Denver Nuggets 147

McNichols Sports Arena, Denver, Colorado

November 30, 1984

Recap

Denver Nuggets 97, Utah Jazz 116

Salt Palace Acord Arena, Salt Lake City

December 1, 1984

Recap

Utah Jazz 111, Denver Nuggets 118

McNichols Sports Arena, Denver, Colorado

January 4, 1985

Recap

Denver Nuggets 108, Utah Jazz 118

Salt Palace Acord Arena, Salt Lake City

January 28, 1985

Recap

Denver Nuggets 104, Utah Jazz 100

Salt Palace Acord Arena, Salt Lake City

March 26, 1985

Recap

Utah Jazz 89, Denver Nuggets 104

McNichols Sports Arena, Denver, Colorado

This was the second playoff meeting between these two teams, with the Jazz winning the first meeting.

Previous playoff series
Utah leads 1–0 in all-time playoff series

1984

Denver Nuggets 2, Utah Jazz 3

1984 Western Conference First Round

== Conference finals ==
=== Eastern Conference finals ===
==== (1) Boston Celtics vs. (3) Philadelphia 76ers ====
May 12

Boxscore

Philadelphia 76ers 93, Boston Celtics 108
Scoring by quarter: 28–33, 24–24, 21–19, 20–32
Pts: Maurice Cheeks 27; Rebs: Charles Barkley 12; Asts: Maurice Cheeks 7	Pts: Kevin McHale 28; Rebs: Robert Parish 13; Asts: Dennis Johnson 8
Boston leads series, 1–0

Boston Garden, Boston, Massachusetts
Attendance: 14,890
Referees: Earl Strom, Hue Hollins

May 14

Boxscore

Philadelphia 76ers 98, Boston Celtics 106
Scoring by quarter: 28–20, 24–26, 18–32, 28–28
Pts: Julius Erving 22; Rebs: Moses Malone 13; Asts: Cheeks, Erving 7 each	Pts: Larry Bird 24; Rebs: Robert Parish 16; Asts: Bird, Johnson 7 each
Boston leads series, 2–0

Boston Garden, Boston, Massachusetts
Attendance: 14,890
Referees: Darell Garretson, Joe Crawford

May 18

Boxscore

Boston Celtics 105, Philadelphia 76ers 94
Scoring by quarter: 20–28, 28–19, 31–27, 26–20
Pts: Larry Bird 26; Rebs: Robert Parish 14; Asts: Danny Ainge 7	Pts: Andrew Toney 26; Rebs: Moses Malone 16; Asts: Andrew Toney 5
Boston leads series, 3–0

Spectrum, Philadelphia, Pennsylvania
Attendance: 17,921
Referees: Ed T. Rush, Mike Mathis

May 19

Boxscore

Boston Celtics 104, Philadelphia 76ers 115
Scoring by quarter: 16–31, 28–29, 30–25, 30–30
Pts: Kevin McHale 25; Rebs: Kevin McHale 17; Asts: Danny Ainge 8	Pts: Andrew Toney 26; Rebs: Charles Barkley 20; Asts: Julius Erving 6
Boston leads series, 3–1

Spectrum, Philadelphia, Pennsylvania
Attendance: 17,101
Referees: Jake O'Donnell, Jess Kersey

May 22

Boxscore

Philadelphia 76ers 100, Boston Celtics 102
Scoring by quarter: 30–28, 21–28, 26–25, 23–21
Pts: Maurice Cheeks 26; Rebs: Moses Malone 15; Asts: Toney, Cheeks 6 each	Pts: Dennis Johnson 23; Rebs: Kevin McHale 14; Asts: Dennis Johnson 8
Boston wins series, 4–1

Boston Garden, Boston, Massachusetts
Attendance: 14,890
Referees: John Vanak, Hugh Evans

- Larry Bird makes the game-saving steal from Andrew Toney in the closing seconds to help the Celtics advance to the Finals.

Regular-season series
Tied 3–3 in the regular-season series

November 9, 1984

Recap

Philadelphia 76ers 119, Boston Celtics 130

Boston Garden, Boston

December 12, 1984

Recap

Boston Celtics 107, Philadelphia 76ers 110

Spectrum, Philadelphia

January 20, 1985

Recap

Philadelphia 76ers 97, Boston Celtics 113

Boston Garden, Boston

January 30, 1985

Recap

Boston Celtics 104, Philadelphia 76ers 122

Spectrum, Philadelphia

March 29, 1985

Recap

Philadelphia 76ers 108, Boston Celtics 112

Boston Garden, Boston

April 9, 1985

Recap

Boston Celtics 104, Philadelphia 76ers 113

Spectrum, Philadelphia

This was the 18th playoff meeting between these two teams, with the Celtics winning nine of the first 17 meetings.

Previous playoff series
Boston leads 9–8 in all-time playoff series

1953

Boston Celtics 2, Syracuse Nationals 0

1953 Eastern Division Semifinals

1954

Boston Celtics 0, Syracuse Nationals 2

1954 Eastern Division Round Robin Semifinals

1954

Boston Celtics 0, Syracuse Nationals 2

1954 Eastern Division Finals

1955

Boston Celtics 1, Syracuse Nationals 3

1955 Eastern Division Finals

1956

Boston Celtics 1, Syracuse Nationals 2

1956 Eastern Division Semifinals

1957

Boston Celtics 3, Syracuse Nationals 0

1957 Eastern Division Finals

1959

Boston Celtics 4, Syracuse Nationals 3

1959 Eastern Division Finals

1961

Boston Celtics 4, Syracuse Nationals 1

1961 Eastern Division Finals

1965

Boston Celtics 4, Philadelphia 76ers 3

1965 Eastern Division Finals

1966

Boston Celtics 4, Philadelphia 76ers 1

1966 Eastern Division Finals

1967

Boston Celtics 1, Philadelphia 76ers 4

1967 Eastern Division Finals

1968

Boston Celtics 4, Philadelphia 76ers 3

1968 Eastern Division Finals

1969

Boston Celtics 4, Philadelphia 76ers 1

1969 Eastern Division Semifinals

1977

Boston Celtics 3, Philadelphia 76ers 4

1977 Eastern Conference Semifinals

1980

Boston Celtics 1, Philadelphia 76ers 4

1980 Eastern Conference Finals

1981

Boston Celtics 4, Philadelphia 76ers 3

1981 Eastern Conference Finals

1982

Boston Celtics 3, Philadelphia 76ers 4

1982 Eastern Conference Finals

=== Western Conference finals ===
==== (1) Los Angeles Lakers vs. (2) Denver Nuggets ====
May 11

Boxscore

Denver Nuggets 122, Los Angeles Lakers 139
Scoring by quarter: 30–38, 22–42, 36–34, 34–25
Pts: Alex English 30; Rebs: Dan Issel 8 Asts: Mike Evans 11	Pts: Byron Scott 27; Rebs: three players 7 each Asts: Magic Johnson 16
LA Lakers lead series, 1–0

The Forum, Inglewood, California
Attendance: 16,109
Referees: Lee Jones, Jess Kersey

May 14

Boxscore

Denver Nuggets 136, Los Angeles Lakers 114
Scoring by quarter: 30–27, 36–32, 23–27, 47–28
Pts: Alex English 40; Rebs: Elston Turner 11; Asts: Elston Turner 8	Pts: Byron Scott 22; Rebs: Magic Johnson 9 Asts: Magic Johnson 15
Series tied, 1–1

The Forum, Inglewood, California
Attendance: 17,505
Referees: Jake O'Donnell, Art Rooney

May 17

Boxscore

Los Angeles Lakers 136, Denver Nuggets 118
Scoring by quarter: 39–38, 40–30, 35–20, 22–30
Pts: James Worthy 28; Rebs: Magic Johnson 14; Asts: Magic Johnson 15	Pts: Calvin Natt 30; Rebs: Calvin Natt 7 Asts: Elston Turner 6
LA Lakers lead series, 2–1

McNichols Sports Arena, Denver, Colorado
Attendance: 17,022
Referees: John Vanak, Hugh Evans

May 19

Boxscore

Los Angeles Lakers 120, Denver Nuggets 116
Scoring by quarter: 35–34, 33–36, 25–23, 27–23
Pts: Kareem Abdul-Jabbar 29; Rebs: James Worthy 13; Asts: Magic Johnson 13	Pts: Natt, English 28 each Rebs: Natt, English 8 each Asts: Elston Turner 10
LA Lakers lead series, 3–1

McNichols Sports Arena, Denver, Colorado
Attendance: 17,022
Referees: Darell Garretson, Joe Crawford

May 22

Boxscore

Denver Nuggets 109, Los Angeles Lakers 153
Scoring by quarter: 34–34, 19–42, 28–39, 28–38
Pts: Wayne Cooper 23; Rebs: Danny Schayes 9 Asts: Fat Lever 6	Pts: James Worthy 25; Rebs: Mitch Kupchak 10; Asts: Magic Johnson 19
LA Lakers win series, 4–1

The Forum, Inglewood, California
Attendance: 17,505
Referees: Earl Strom, Ed T. Rush

- Dan Issel's final NBA game.

Regular-season series
Los Angeles won 3–2 in the regular-season series

November 6, 1984

Recap

Denver Nuggets 146, Los Angeles Lakers 130

The Forum, Inglewood, California

December 28, 1984

Recap

Los Angeles Lakers 135, Denver Nuggets 123

McNichols Sports Arena, Denver, Colorado

January 8, 1985

Recap

Denver Nuggets 126, Los Angeles Lakers 124

The Forum, Inglewood, California

April 2, 1985

Recap

Los Angeles Lakers 118, Denver Nuggets 104

McNichols Sports Arena, Denver, Colorado

April 9, 1985

Recap

Denver Nuggets 119, Los Angeles Lakers 148

The Forum, Inglewood, California

This was the second playoff meeting between these two teams, with the Lakers winning the first meeting.

Previous playoff series
Los Angeles leads 1–0 in all-time playoff series

1979

Denver Nuggets 1, Los Angeles Lakers 2

1979 Western Conference First Round

== NBA Finals: (E1) Boston Celtics vs. (W1) Los Angeles Lakers ==
May 27

Boxscore

Los Angeles Lakers 114, Boston Celtics 148
Scoring by quarter: 24–38, 25–41, 30–29, 35–40
Pts: James Worthy 20; Rebs: Kurt Rambis 9 Asts: Magic Johnson 12	Pts: McHale, Wedman 26 each Rebs: Kevin McHale 9 Asts: Dennis Johnson 10
Boston leads series, 1–0

Boston Garden, Boston, Massachusetts
Attendance: 14,890
Referees: Darell Garretson, Jess Kersey

- "Memorial Day Massacre"

May 30

Boxscore

Los Angeles Lakers 109, Boston Celtics 102
Scoring by quarter: 31–26, 33–20, 23–29, 22–27
Pts: Kareem Abdul-Jabbar 30; Rebs: Kareem Abdul-Jabbar 17; Asts: Magic Johnson 13	Pts: Larry Bird 30; Rebs: Larry Bird 12; Asts: Dennis Johnson 8
Series tied, 1–1

Boston Garden, Boston, Massachusetts
Attendance: 14,890
Referees: Jake O'Donnell, John Vanak

June 2

Boxscore

Boston Celtics 111, Los Angeles Lakers 136
Scoring by quarter: 29–25, 30–40, 26–35, 26–36
Pts: Kevin McHale 31; Rebs: Kevin McHale 10; Asts: Danny Ainge 10	Pts: James Worthy 29; Rebs: Kareem Abdul-Jabbar 14; Asts: Magic Johnson 16
LA Lakers lead series, 2–1

The Forum, Inglewood, California
Attendance: 17,505
Referees: Hugh Evans, Earl Strom

- Kareem Abdul-Jabbar breaks Jerry West's all-time playoff scoring record.

June 5

Boxscore

Boston Celtics 107, Los Angeles Lakers 105
Scoring by quarter: 28–32, 31–26, 23–26, 25–21
Pts: Kevin McHale 28; Rebs: Kevin McHale 12; Asts: Dennis Johnson 12	Pts: Kareem Abdul-Jabbar 21; Rebs: Magic Johnson 11; Asts: Magic Johnson 12
Series tied, 2–2

The Forum, Inglewood, California
Attendance: 17,505
Referees: Ed T. Rush, John Vanak

- Dennis Johnson hits the game-winner at the buzzer.

June 7

Boxscore

Boston Celtics 111, Los Angeles Lakers 120
Scoring by quarter: 31–35, 20–29, 30–31, 30–25
Pts: Robert Parish 26; Rebs: Kevin McHale 10; Asts: Dennis Johnson 17	Pts: Kareem Abdul-Jabbar 36; Rebs: Kurt Rambis 9 Asts: Magic Johnson 17
LA Lakers lead series, 3–2

The Forum, Inglewood, California
Attendance: 17,505
Referees: Darell Garretson, Jake O'Donnell

June 9

Boxscore

Los Angeles Lakers 111, Boston Celtics 100
Scoring by quarter: 28–26, 27–29, 27–18, 29–27
Pts: Kareem Abdul-Jabbar 29; Rebs: Johnson, Rambis 10 each Asts: Magic Johnson 14	Pts: Kevin McHale 32; Rebs: Kevin McHale 16; Asts: Danny Ainge 11
LA Lakers win series, 4–2

Boston Garden, Boston, Massachusetts
Attendance: 14,890
Referees: Hugh Evans, Earl Strom

- The Lakers become the only road team to win the NBA title in Boston Garden. They were the last visitor to win the title in Boston until the Golden State Warriors did it in the 2022 NBA Finals at TD Garden.

Regular-season series
Tied 1–1 in the regular-season series

January 16, 1985

Recap

Los Angeles Lakers 102, Boston Celtics 104

Boston Garden, Boston

February 17, 1985

Recap

Boston Celtics 111, Los Angeles Lakers 117

The Forum, Inglewood, California

This was the ninth playoff meeting between these two teams, with the Celtics winning the first eight meetings.

Previous playoff series
Boston leads 8–0 in all-time playoff series

1959

Boston Celtics 4, Minneapolis Lakers 0

1959 NBA Finals

1962

Boston Celtics 4, Los Angeles Lakers 3

1962 NBA Finals

1963

Boston Celtics 4, Los Angeles Lakers 2

1963 NBA Finals

1965

Boston Celtics 4, Los Angeles Lakers 1

1965 NBA Finals

1966

Boston Celtics 4, Los Angeles Lakers 3

1966 NBA Finals

1968

Boston Celtics 4, Los Angeles Lakers 2

1968 NBA Finals

1969

Boston Celtics 4, Los Angeles Lakers 3

1969 NBA Finals

1984

Boston Celtics 4, Los Angeles Lakers 3

1984 NBA Finals

== Statistical leaders ==
Category	Game high			Average			
Category	Player	Team	High	Player	Team	Avg.	GP
Points	Larry Bird; Rolando Blackman	Boston Celtics; Dallas Mavericks	43	Rolando Blackman	Dallas Mavericks	32.8	4
Rebounds	Ralph Sampson	Houston Rockets	24	Ralph Sampson	Houston Rockets	16.6	5
Assists	Magic Johnson	Los Angeles Lakers	23	Magic Johnson	Los Angeles Lakers	15.2	19
Steals	Julius Erving; Kareem Abdul-Jabbar; Clyde Drexler; Paul Pressey; Moses Malone	Philadelphia 76ers Los Angeles Lakers; Portland Trail Blazers; Milwaukee Bucks; Philadelphia 76ers	5	Michael Jordan	Chicago Bulls	2.8	4
Blocks	Mark Eaton	Utah Jazz	10	Mark Eaton	Utah Jazz	5.8	5
