= List of NBA career playoff 3-point scoring leaders =

This article provides two lists:

A list of National Basketball Association players by total career Playoffs three-point field goals made.

A progressive list of three-point leaders showing how the record has increased through the years.

== Playoff 3-point field goals made leaders ==
This is a list of National Basketball Association players by total career Playoffs three-point field goals made.

Statistics accurate as of the 2026 NBA playoffs.

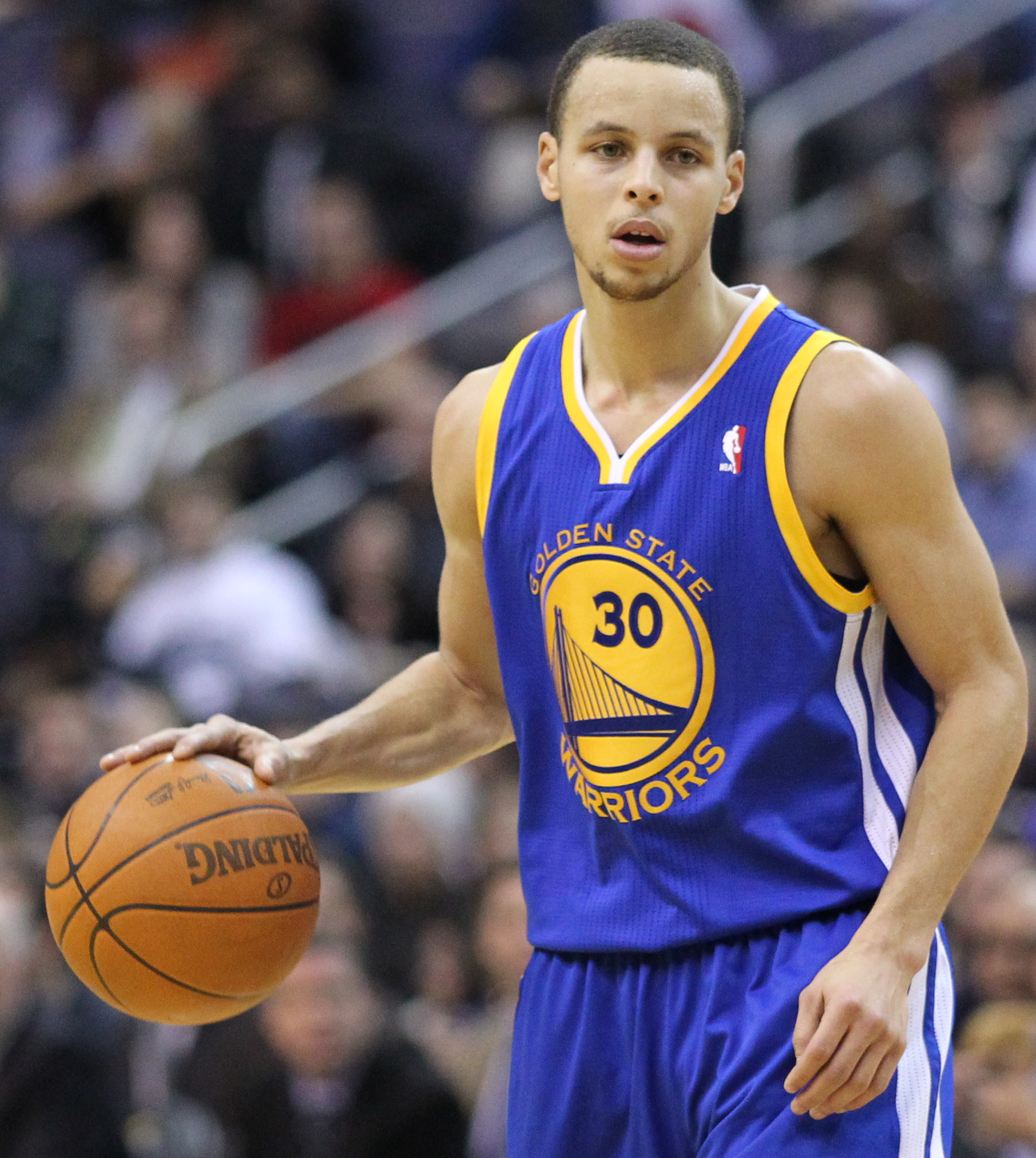
Stephen Curry has made the most 3-point field goals in NBA playoffs history.

^	Active NBA player
*	Inducted into the Naismith Memorial Basketball Hall of Fame
†	Not yet eligible for Hall of Fame consideration

Rank	Player	Position(s)	Playoff team(s) played for (years)	Total 3-point field goals made	Total 3-point field goals attempted	3-point field goal percentage	3-point field goals made per game
1	Stephen Curry^	PG	Golden State Warriors (2013–2019, 2022–2023, 2025)	650	1,637	.397	4.19
2	Klay Thompson^	SG	Golden State Warriors (2013–2019, 2022–2023)	501	1,237	.405	3.17
3	LeBron James^	SF	Cleveland Cavaliers (2006–2010, 2015–2018); Miami Heat (2011–2014); Los Angeles Lakers (2020–2021, 2023–2026)	497	1,495	.332	1.65
4	James Harden^	SG/PG	Oklahoma City Thunder (2010–2012); Houston Rockets (2013–2020); Brooklyn Nets (2021); Philadelphia 76ers (2022–2023); Los Angeles Clippers (2024–2025); Cleveland Cavaliers (2026)	472	1,402	.337	2.47
5	Ray Allen*	SG	Milwaukee Bucks (1999–2001); Seattle SuperSonics (2005); Boston Celtics (2008–2012); Miami Heat (2013–2014)	385	959	.401	2.25
6	Kevin Durant^	SF/PF	Oklahoma City Thunder (2010–2014, 2016); Golden State Warriors (2017–2019); Brooklyn Nets (2021–2022); Phoenix Suns (2023–2024); Houston Rockets (2026)	367	1,033	.355	2.15
7	Manu Ginóbili*	SG	San Antonio Spurs (2003–2008, 2010–2018)	324	905	.358	1.49
8	Reggie Miller*	SG	Indiana Pacers (1990–1996, 1998–2005)	320	820	.390	2.22
9	Danny Green^{†}	SG/SF	San Antonio Spurs (2011–2018); Toronto Raptors (2019); Los Angeles Lakers (2020); Philadelphia 76ers (2021–2022); Cleveland Cavaliers (2023)	315	812	.388	1.86
11	Paul George^	SF	Indiana Pacers (2011–2014, 2016–2017); Oklahoma City Thunder (2018–2019); Los Angeles Clippers (2020–2021, 2024); Philadelphia 76ers (2026)	311	854	.364	2.49
11	Jayson Tatum^	SF/PF	Boston Celtics (2018–2026)	311	892	.349	2.45
12	J.R. Smith	SG	Denver Nuggets (2007–2011); New York Knicks (2012–2013); Cleveland Cavaliers (2015–2018); Los Angeles Lakers (2020)	294	801	.367	2.10
13	Kobe Bryant*	SG	Los Angeles Lakers (1997–2004, 2006–2012)	292	882	.331	1.33
14	Derek Fisher	PG	Los Angeles Lakers (1997–2004, 2008–2011); Utah Jazz (2007); Oklahoma City Thunder (2012–2014)	285	715	.399	1.10
15	Jaylen Brown^	SG/SF	Boston Celtics (2017–2020, 2022–2026)	280	784	.357	1.97
16	Paul Pierce*	SG	Boston Celtics (2002–2005, 2008–2013); Brooklyn Nets (2014); Washington Wizards (2015); Los Angeles Clippers (2016–2017)	276	777	.355	1.62
17	Chauncey Billups*	PG	Minnesota Timberwolves (2001–2002); Detroit Pistons (2003–2008); Denver Nuggets (2009–2010); New York Knicks (2011); Los Angeles Clippers (2013)	267	729	.366	1.83
18	Robert Horry	PF	Houston Rockets (1993–1996); Los Angeles Lakers (1997–2003); San Antonio Spurs (2004–2008)	261	728	.359	1.07
19	Kyle Korver	SG/SF	Philadelphia 76ers (2005); Utah Jazz (2008–2010, 2019); Chicago Bulls (2010–2012); Atlanta Hawks (2013–2016); Cleveland Cavaliers (2017–2018); Milwaukee Bucks (2020)	254	649	.391	1.75
20	Donovan Mitchell^	PG	Utah Jazz (2018–2022); Cleveland Cavaliers (2023–2026)	250	717	.349	3.09
21	Kawhi Leonard^	SF	San Antonio Spurs (2012–2017); Toronto Raptors (2019); Los Angeles Clippers (2020–2021, 2023–2025)	249	624	.399	1.71
22	Chris Paul^{†}	PG	New Orleans Hornets (2008–2009, 2011); Los Angeles Clippers (2012–2017); Houston Rockets (2018–2019); Oklahoma City Thunder (2020); Phoenix Suns (2021–2023)	244	654	.373	1.64
23	Kyle Lowry^{†}	PG	Houston Rockets (2009); Toronto Raptors (2014–2020); Miami Heat (2022–2023); Philadelphia 76ers (2024, 2026)	238	704	.338	1.72
24	Jason Kidd*	PG	Phoenix Suns (1997–2001); New Jersey Nets (2002–2007); Dallas Mavericks (2008–2012); New York Knicks (2013)	236	733	.322	1.49
25	Kyrie Irving^	PG	Cleveland Cavaliers (2015–2017); Boston Celtics (2019); Brooklyn Nets (2021–2022); Dallas Mavericks (2024)	225	574	.392	2.34
25	Marcus Smart^	PG	Boston Celtics (2015–2023); Los Angeles Lakers (2026)	225	672	.335	1.91
Rank	Player	Position(s)	Playoff team(s) played for (years)	Total 3-point field goals made	Total 3-point field goals attempted	3-point field goal percentage	3-point field goals made per game

== Progressive list of playoff 3-point field goals made ==
This is a progressive list of 3-point scoring leaders showing how the record has increased through the years.

Statistics accurate as of the 2026 NBA playoffs.

^	Active NBA player
*	Inducted into the Naismith Memorial Basketball Hall of Fame
†	Not yet eligible for Hall of Fame consideration

Team abbreviationsTeam(s) listed is the one player was on when he established the record.
ATL	Atlanta Hawks	DET	Detroit Pistons	MIA	Miami Heat	PHI	Philadelphia 76ers
BOS	Boston Celtics	GSW	Golden State Warriors	MIL	Milwaukee Bucks	PHO	Phoenix Suns
CHI	Chicago Bulls	HOU	Houston Rockets	MIN	Minnesota Timberwolves	POR	Portland Trail Blazers
CLE	Cleveland Cavaliers	IND	Indiana Pacers	NOP	New Orleans Pelicans	SAS	San Antonio Spurs
DAL	Dallas Mavericks	KCK	Kansas City Kings	NYK	New York Knicks	SEA	Seattle SuperSonics
DEN	Denver Nuggets	LAL	Los Angeles Lakers	ORL	Orlando Magic	WSB	Washington Bullets

Leaders and records for playoff 3-point field goals for every season
Season	Year-by-year leader	3P	Active player leader	3P	Career record	3P	Single-season record	3P	Season
1979–80	Fred BrownSEA	10	Fred BrownSEA	10	Fred BrownSEA	10	Fred BrownSEA	10	1979–80
1980–81	Scott WedmanKCK	9	Scott WedmanKCK; Brian WintersMIL	11	Scott WedmanKCK; Brian WintersMIL	11	Fred BrownSEA	10	1980–81
1981–82	Andrew ToneyPHI; Brian WintersMIL; Frank JohnsonWSB; Mike BratzSAS	5	Brian WintersMIL	16	Brian WintersMIL	16	Fred BrownSEA	10	1981–82
1982–83	Johnny MooreSAS	9	Brian WintersMIL	19	Brian WintersMIL	19	Fred BrownSEA	10	1982–83
1983–84	Mike DunleavyMIL	18	Mike DunleavyMIL	32	Mike DunleavyMIL	32	Mike DunleavyMIL	18	1983–84
1984–85	Mike EvansDEN	17	Mike DunleavyMIL	32	Mike DunleavyMIL	32	Mike DunleavyMIL	18	1984–85
1985–86	Larry Bird*BOS	23	Larry Bird*BOS	46	Larry Bird*BOS	46	Larry Bird*BOS	23	1985–86
1986–87	Michael Cooper*LAL	34	Michael Cooper*LAL	75	Michael Cooper*LAL	75	Michael Cooper*LAL	34	1986–87
1987–88	Michael Cooper*LAL	25	Michael Cooper*LAL	100	Michael Cooper*LAL	100	Michael Cooper*LAL	34	1987–88
1988–89	Craig HodgesCHI	35	Michael Cooper*LAL	121	Michael Cooper*LAL	121	Craig HodgesCHI	35	1988–89
1989–90	Terry PorterPOR	40	Michael Cooper*LAL	124	Michael Cooper*LAL	124	Terry PorterPOR	40	1989–90
1990–91	Magic Johnson*LAL	21	Byron ScottLAL	97	Michael Cooper*LAL	124	Terry PorterPOR	40	1990–91
1991–92	Terry PorterPOR	37	Danny Ainge; POR 1991–92; PHO 1992–95	110	Michael Cooper*LAL	124	Terry PorterPOR	40	1991–92
1992–93	Dan MajerlePHO	54	Danny Ainge; POR 1991–92; PHO 1992–95	143	Danny AingePHO	143	Dan MajerlePHO	54	1992–93
1993–94	John StarksNYK	47	Danny Ainge; POR 1991–92; PHO 1992–95	160	Danny AingePHO	160	Dan MajerlePHO	54	1993–94
1994–95	Dennis ScottORL	56	Danny Ainge; POR 1991–92; PHO 1992–95	172	Danny AingePHO	172	Dennis ScottORL	56	1994–95
1995–96	Gary Payton*SEA	41	John StarksNYK	137	Danny AingePHO	172	Dennis ScottORL	56	1995–96
1996–97	Matt MaloneyHOU	43	John StarksNYK; Dan MajerleMIA	150	Danny AingePHO	172	Dennis ScottORL	56	1996–97
1997–98	Reggie Miller*IND	38	John StarksNYK	175	John StarksNYK	175	Dennis ScottORL	56	1997–98
1998–99	Jaren JacksonSAS	31	Reggie Miller*IND	185	Reggie Miller*IND	185	Dennis ScottORL	56	1998–99
1999–00	Reggie Miller*IND	58	Reggie Miller*IND	243	Reggie Miller*IND	243	Reggie Miller*IND	58	1999–00
2000–01	Ray Allen*MIL	57	Reggie Miller*IND	258	Reggie Miller*IND	258	Reggie Miller*IND	58	2000–01
2001–02	Antoine WalkerBOS	42	Reggie Miller*IND	271	Reggie Miller*IND	271	Reggie Miller*IND	58	2001–02
2002–03	Michael Finley DAL	47	Reggie Miller*IND	275	Reggie Miller*IND	275	Reggie Miller*IND	58	2002–03
2003–04	Chauncey Billups*DET Latrell SprewellMIN	37	Reggie Miller*IND	299	Reggie Miller*IND	299	Reggie Miller*IND	58	2003–04
2004–05	Chauncey Billups*DET	44	Reggie Miller*IND	320	Reggie Miller*IND	320	Reggie Miller*IND	58	2004–05
2005–06	Tim Thomas PHO; Antoine WalkerMIA	48	Robert HorrySAS	243	Reggie Miller*IND	320	Reggie Miller*IND	58	2005–06
2006–07	Michael Finley SAS	44	Robert HorrySAS	256	Reggie Miller*IND	320	Reggie Miller*IND	58	2006–07
2007–08	Ray Allen*BOS	55	Robert HorrySAS	261	Reggie Miller*IND	320	Reggie Miller*IND	58	2007–08
2008–09	Rashard Lewis ORL	52	Chauncey Billups*DEN	248	Reggie Miller*IND	320	Reggie Miller*IND	58	2008–09
2009–10	Ray Allen*BOS	56	Kobe Bryant*LAL	263	Reggie Miller*IND	320	Reggie Miller*IND	58	2009–10
2010–11	Jason Kidd*DAL	43	Ray Allen*; BOS 2010–12; MIA 2012–14	285	Reggie Miller*IND	320	Reggie Miller*IND	58	2010–11
2011–12	Shane BattierMIA	42	Ray Allen*; BOS 2010–12; MIA 2012–14	313	Reggie Miller*IND	320	Reggie Miller*IND	58	2011–12
2012–13	Danny Green^{†}SAS	55	Ray Allen*; BOS 2010–12; MIA 2012–14	352	Ray Allen*MIA	352	Reggie Miller*IND	58	2012–13
2013–14	Paul George^IND	52	Ray Allen*; BOS 2010–12; MIA 2012–14	385	Ray Allen*MIA	385	Reggie Miller*IND	58	2013–14
2014–15	Stephen Curry^GSW	98	Manu Ginóbili*SAS	300	Ray Allen*MIA	385	Stephen Curry^GSW	98	2014–15
2015–16	Klay Thompson^GSW	98	Manu Ginóbili*SAS	309	Ray Allen*MIA	385	Stephen Curry^GSW; Klay Thompson^GSW	98	2015–16
2016–17	Stephen Curry^GSW	72	LeBron James^CLE	331	Ray Allen*MIA	385	Stephen Curry^GSW; Klay Thompson^GSW	98	2016–17
2017–18	Klay Thompson^GSW	67	Stephen Curry^GSW	378	Ray Allen*MIA	385	Stephen Curry^GSW; Klay Thompson^GSW	98	2017–18
2018–19	Stephen Curry^GSW	92	Stephen Curry^GSW	470	Stephen Curry^GSW	470	Stephen Curry^GSW; Klay Thompson^GSW	98	2018–19
2019–20	Jamal Murray^ DEN; Duncan Robinson^MIA	62	Stephen Curry^GSW	470	Stephen Curry^GSW	470	Stephen Curry^GSW; Klay Thompson^GSW	98	2019–20
2020–21	Khris Middleton^ MIL	60	Stephen Curry^GSW	470	Stephen Curry^GSW	470	Stephen Curry^GSW; Klay Thompson^GSW	98	2020–21
2021–22	Stephen Curry^ GSW	91	Stephen Curry^GSW	561	Stephen Curry^GSW	561	Stephen Curry^GSW; Klay Thompson^GSW	98	2021–22
2022–23	Jamal Murray^ DEN	59	Stephen Curry^GSW	618	Stephen Curry^GSW	618	Stephen Curry^GSW; Klay Thompson^GSW	98	2022–23
2023–24	Luka Dončić^ DAL	68	Stephen Curry^GSW	618	Stephen Curry^GSW	618	Stephen Curry^GSW; Klay Thompson^GSW	98	2023–24
2024–25	Aaron Nesmith^ IND	60	Stephen Curry^GSW	650	Stephen Curry^GSW	650	Stephen Curry^GSW; Klay Thompson^GSW	98	2024–25
2025–26	Julian Champagnie^ SAS	61	Stephen Curry^GSW	650	Stephen Curry^GSW	650	Stephen Curry^GSW; Klay Thompson^GSW	98	2025–26
Season	Year-by-year leader	3P	Active player leader	3P	Career record	3P	Single-season record	3P	Season

== See also ==
- Basketball statistics
- NBA post-season records
- List of NBA career 3-point scoring leaders
