= Sidney Moncrief =

American basketball player-coach (born 1957)

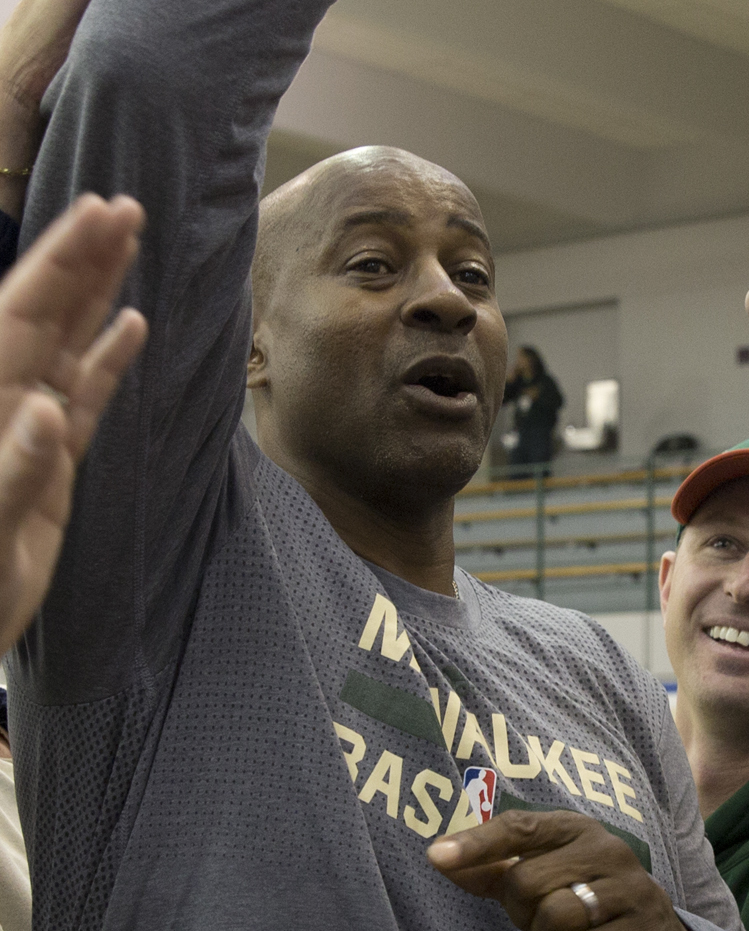
- Moncrief in 2015

Personal information
- Born: September 21, 1957 (age 69) Little Rock, Arkansas, U.S.
- Listed height: 6 ft 4 in (1.93 m)
- Listed weight: 180 lb (82 kg)

Career information
- High school: Hall (Little Rock, Arkansas)
- College: Arkansas (1975–1979)
- NBA draft: 1979: 1st round, 5th overall pick
- Drafted by: Milwaukee Bucks
- Playing career: 1979–1991
- Position: Shooting guard
- Number: 4, 15
- Coaching career: 1999–2013

Career history

Playing
- 1979–1989: Milwaukee Bucks
- 1990–1991: Atlanta Hawks

Coaching
- 1999–2000: Arkansas–Little Rock
- 2006–2007: Fort Worth Flyers
- 2007–2008: Golden State Warriors (assistant)
- 2009: Beijing Ducks (assistant)
- 2009–2010: Beijing Ducks
- 2011–2013: Milwaukee Bucks (assistant)

Career highlights
- 5× NBA All-Star (1982–1986); All-NBA First Team (1983); 4× All-NBA Second Team (1982, 1984–1986); 2× NBA Defensive Player of the Year (1983, 1984); 4× NBA All-Defensive First Team (1983–1986); NBA All-Defensive Second Team (1982); No. 4 retired by Milwaukee Bucks; Consensus first-team All-American (1979); Second-team All-American – UPI (1978); Third-team All-American – AP, NABC (1978); SWC Player of the Year (1979); First-team All-SWC (1979); No. 32 retired by Arkansas Razorbacks

Career NBA statistics
- Points: 11,931 (15.6 ppg)
- Rebounds: 3,575 (4.7 rpg)
- Assists: 2,793 (3.6 apg)
- Stats at NBA.com
- Stats at Basketball Reference
- Basketball Hall of Fame
- Collegiate Basketball Hall of Fame

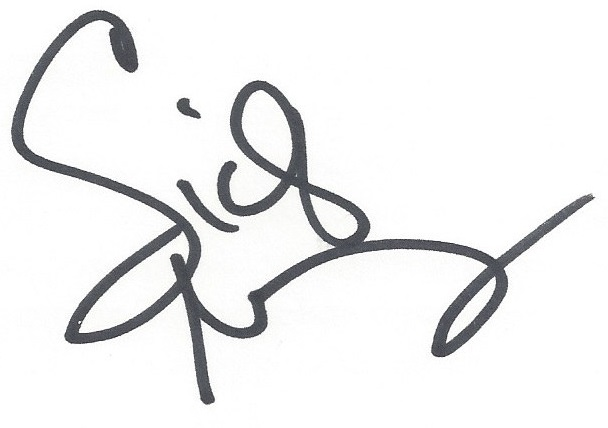
Moncrief's signature

Sidney Alvin Moncrief (born September 21, 1957) is an American former professional basketball player. As an NCAA college basketball player from 1975 to 1979, Moncrief played for the University of Arkansas Razorbacks, leading them to the 1978 Final Four and a win in the NCAA Consolation Game versus #6 Notre Dame. Nicknamed Sid the Squid, Sir Sid, and El Sid, Moncrief went on to play 11 seasons in the National Basketball Association, including ten seasons with the Milwaukee Bucks. He was a five-time NBA All-Star and won the first two NBA Defensive Player of the Year awards in 1983 and 1984. He was elected to the Naismith Memorial Basketball Hall of Fame in 2019.

== Early life ==
Sidney Alvin Moncrief was born on September 21, 1957, in Little Rock, Arkansas.

== College career ==
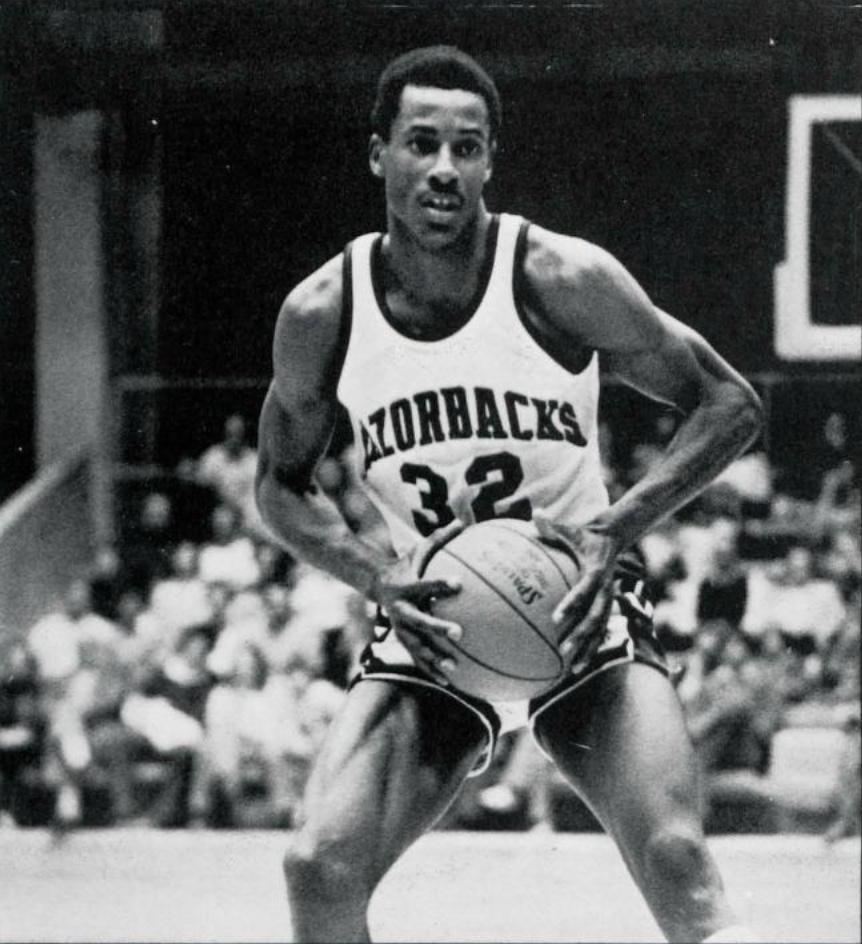
Moncrief as a sophomore at Arkansas

Moncrief, Marvin Delph of Conway, Arkansas, and Ron Brewer of Fort Smith, Arkansas ("The Triplets"), along with head coach Eddie Sutton and assistant coach Gene Keady, resurrected the University of Arkansas basketball program in the 1970s from decades of modest success and disinterest, and helped lay the foundation for what became one of the country's premier college basketball programs through the late-1990s. Moncrief led the Razorbacks to the SWC regular season championship in 1977, 1978, and 1979, and the SWC Tournament championship in 1977 and 1979. Moncrief was also part of the 1978 Final Four run for Arkansas, that saw the Razorbacks lose to eventual champion Kentucky in the semi-finals, and then defeat Notre Dame in the last 3rd place game ever played at the NCAA Final Four. The following year, Moncrief and Arkansas lost to Larry Bird and Indiana State in the Elite Eight. Moncrief's leadership on the court and electrifying play renewed interest in the Razorback program, and ushered in a new winning tradition in Arkansas basketball.

His jersey was retired not long after he graduated from school and went on to the NBA, and is one of only two, along with Corliss Williamson. Moncrief was the school's all-time leading scorer until Todd Day broke his record in 1992. At 6'4", he still remains the schools leader in rebounds in a career with 1015. On November 10, 2014, Moncrief was inducted into the Southwest Conference Hall of Fame. After being honored decades earlier with an unofficial banner, on February 7, 2015, Moncrief was officially honored by Arkansas when his name was put on a banner that was hung in the Razorbacks’ new home, Bud Walton Arena. He was the first player in Arkansas’ program history to have his number retired. Moncrief has also been inducted into the University of Arkansas Hall of Honor.

== Professional career ==
=== Milwaukee Bucks (1979–1989) ===
In the 1979 NBA draft, the Milwaukee Bucks selected Moncrief fifth overall, despite Jerry West wanting the Los Angeles Lakers to draft him first overall over Magic Johnson. Though his debut season was overshadowed by fellow rookies Johnson and Larry Bird, Moncrief helped lead an 11-win turnaround for the Bucks, who returned to the playoffs and lost in seven games to the Seattle SuperSonics in the Western Conference semi-finals.

During the 1980-81 NBA season, Moncrief helped the Bucks to a 60–22 record, third best in the league, while averaging 14 points, 5.1 rebounds and 3.3 assists. Despite the strong showing in the regular season, Milwaukee lost in seven games to Philadelphia in the conference semifinals, after coach Don Nelson unsuccessfully contested Milwaukee's 99-98 Game 7 loss for two hours and sixteen minutes, while questioning whether Philadelphia got away with a 24-second violation at the end of the game. The following year, in Game 3 of their Eastern Conference Semifinals matchup, Moncrief made a running bank shot at the buzzer to beat the Philadelphia 76ers, though the Bucks lost the series in six games.

On December 5, 1982, in a loss against the New Jersey Nets, Moncrief recorded a career-high 7 steals. On February 24, 1983, Moncrief scored a career-high 42 points, recorded 8 assists, and grabbed 8 rebounds in a 114–103 victory against the Houston Rockets. That postseason, Moncrief led the Bucks to a sweep of Larry Bird and the Boston Celtics in the second round, averaging 23.2 points, 6.5 rebounds, and 4 assists per game, and being on the dunking end of an alley-oop pass from Brian Winters to help put away the Game 4 win. The following round, on May 14, 1983, Moncrief scored 19 points, grabbed 10 rebounds, and recorded 4 steals in a Game 3 loss against the eventual champion 76ers. The Bucks would lose the series 4–1, but would be the only team to beat Philadelphia in any postseason game that year.

On November 30, 1983, Moncrief scored 25 points and blocked a career-high 4 shots in a 139–122 victory against former Bucks player Alex English and the Denver Nuggets. The following month, Moncrief recorded his first career triple-double, with 16 points, 10 rebounds, and 10 assists in a 89–83 win over the Cleveland Cavaliers.

On December 5, 1984, Moncrief and teammates Terry Cummings and Paul Pressey combined for 76 points, an impressive 67% of Milwaukee's points, in a 114–99 victory against the Detroit Pistons. A win in which The Bucks were without Coach Don Nelson, Mike Dunleavy Sr, and Charles Davis, who all suffered neck and back injuries the previous Saturday night at a Baltimore airport. Despite again finding regular season success at a record of 59–23, after the Bucks eliminated the Bulls and Michael Jordan in the first round with a 3–1 series record, Moncrief and his team would be eliminated in the Eastern Conference Semifinals by Philadelphia again.

On March 15, 1986, Moncrief played 48 minutes, the entire game, and scored 27 points along with recording a career-high 12 assists in a 125–116 regular season victory against Michael Jordan and the Chicago Bulls. That postseason, Moncrief and Milwaukee advanced past the Philadelphia 76ers in a tightly contested seven-game series. Moncrief was only able to play in three games of the series due to a heel and knee injuries but still rallied the team when he played, and the Bucks won each game he appeared, including a 113–112 victory in Game 7 at home where he scored 23 points. This meant the Bucks would reach the Eastern Conference finals for a third time with Moncrief. However, yet again Milwaukee would come up short, this time losing to the Boston Celtics.

During the 1987 NBA Playoffs, after advancing past the 76ers in the first round, on May 15, 1987, Moncrief scored a playoff career high of 34 points in a Game 6 win against the Boston Celtics in the Eastern Conference Semifinals. The performance was especially notable given he was primarily guarded by fellow defensive-great Dennis Johnson. However, the Bucks would lose the series in 7 games. On May 24, it was announced Moncrief and teammates Jack Sikma, Randy Breuer, Paul Mokeski, Terry Cummings, and Jerry Reynolds would each be fined between $1,000 and $500 for their roles in an altercation in the game. Danny Ainge and Greg Kite of the Celtics were also fined. The altercation began when Ainge fouled Moncrief from behind during a fastbreak layup attempt, and no players were ejected or suspended. In arguably the last healthy playoff series of his career, Moncrief averaged 20.9 points and 4.4 rebounds per game.

On December 23, 1988, by then frequently missing games due to knee and foot injuries, Moncrief scored 25 points, largely thanks to making 13 of 13 free throw attempts, and added 5 assists in a 113–101 victory against the Dallas Mavericks. Moncrief would retire for the first time at the conclusion of that year's postseason, an Eastern Semifinals loss to the eventual champion Detroit Pistons.

=== Atlanta Hawks (1990–1991) ===
After sitting out of the NBA for one year during the 1989–1990 season, Moncrief played one season with the Atlanta Hawks before retiring at the conclusion of their postseason run. On May 2, 1991, Moncrief scored 23 points in only 22 minutes during a Game 4 victory against the Detroit Pistons, although the Hawks would go on to lose the series. The Bucks initially retired his no. 4 jersey in 1990, and rededicated it at halftime on January 19, 2008, when the Warriors, with whom he was a shooting coach, visited the Bradley Center in Milwaukee, Wisconsin to play the Bucks.

== Legacy ==
During the 1980s, Moncrief was the star player of the Milwaukee Bucks, who had the third best winning percentage for the decade behind only the Los Angeles Lakers and Boston Celtics. Moncrief was known for his versatility on the court, particularly given his 6′4″ stature, but was most known for his tenacious defensive plays. Although he was thought of as one of the greatest shooting guards of his time, he was never able to get to the Finals, as the Bucks frequently came up short in the Eastern Conference Finals. Moncrief was named the NBA Defensive Player of the Year for the 1982–83 and 1983–84 seasons. He also made the All-Star team for five consecutive years and was named to the All-NBA first team for the 1982–83 season. Moncrief averaged over 20 points per game in four seasons of his career and finished his 11-season NBA career with an average of 15.6 PPG. As of 2024, Moncrief still holds the Bucks record for career offensive rating (119.7).

His career was hampered by a degenerative knee condition that affected the cartilage in both of his knees. Starting in 1986, he also frequently missed time due to a reoccurring foot injury.

Among Moncrief's admirers was All-Star Michael Jordan who once described his on-court intensity to an L.A. Times reporter: "When you play against Moncrief, you're in for a night of all-around basketball. He'll hound you everywhere you go, both ends of the court. You just expect it."

Another all-time great, Larry Bird, heralded Moncrief's ability to defend anyone, and said that “Moncrief does everything you're supposed to do on defense and doesn't take any shortcuts, plus he does it every night.”

On finding success covering the best guards and wing players on opposing teams throughout postseason games, from Jordan to Julius Erving, even though at 6’4” he was slightly smaller in many instances, Moncrief said “I just took it as a responsibility as much as it was a challenge. That was something I needed to do to help the team win games. I'd rather just chill on defense and get back on offense, but I didn't have that luxury."

Moncrief was elected to the National High School Hall of Fame in 1992, the Arkansas Sports Hall of Fame in 1993, and the Wisconsin Athletic Hall of Fame in 1998. Moncrief was finally elected to the Naismith Memorial Basketball Hall of Fame in 2019.

== NBA career statistics ==
Legend
| GP | Games played | GS | Games started | MPG | Minutes per game |
| FG% | Field goal percentage | 3P% | 3-point field goal percentage | FT% | Free throw percentage |
| RPG | Rebounds per game | APG | Assists per game | SPG | Steals per game |
| BPG | Blocks per game | PPG | Points per game | **Bold** | Career high |

=== Regular season ===
| Year | Team | GP | GS | MPG | FG% | 3P% | FT% | RPG | APG | SPG | BPG | PPG |
|---|---|---|---|---|---|---|---|---|---|---|---|---|
| 1979–80 | Milwaukee | 77 | — | 20.2 | .468 | .000 | .795 | 4.4 | 1.7 | .9 | .2 | 8.5 |
| 1980–81 | Milwaukee | **80** | — | 30.2 | **.541** | .222 | .804 | 5.1 | 3.3 | 1.1 | **.5** | 14.0 |
| 1981–82 | Milwaukee | **80** | **80** | 37.3 | .523 | .071 | .817 | **6.7** | 4.8 | **1.7** | .3 | 19.8 |
| 1982–83 | Milwaukee | 76 | 76 | 35.7 | .524 | .100 | .826 | 5.8 | 3.9 | 1.5 | .3 | **22.5** |
| 1983–84 | Milwaukee | 79 | 79 | **38.9** | .498 | .278 | .848 | **6.7** | 4.5 | 1.4 | .3 | 20.9 |
| 1984–85 | Milwaukee | 73 | 72 | 37.5 | .483 | .273 | .828 | 5.4 | **5.2** | 1.6 | **.5** | 21.7 |
| 1985–86 | Milwaukee | 73 | 72 | 35.2 | .489 | .320 | .859 | 4.6 | 4.9 | 1.4 | .2 | 20.2 |
| 1986–87 | Milwaukee | 39 | 30 | 25.4 | .488 | .258 | .840 | 3.3 | 3.1 | .7 | .3 | 11.8 |
| 1987–88 | Milwaukee | 56 | 51 | 25.5 | .489 | .161 | .837 | 3.2 | 3.6 | .7 | .3 | 10.8 |
| 1988–89 | Milwaukee | 62 | 50 | 25.7 | .491 | **.342** | **.865** | 2.8 | 3.0 | 1.0 | .2 | 12.1 |
| 1990–91 | Atlanta | 72 | 3 | 15.2 | .488 | .328 | .781 | 1.8 | 1.4 | .7 | .1 | 4.7 |
| Career | | 767 | 513 | 30.2 | .502 | .284 | .831 | 4.7 | 3.6 | 1.2 | .3 | 15.6 |
| All-Star | | 5 | 2 | 23.8 | .404 | 1.000 | .864 | 4.4 | 2.4 | 2.4 | .4 | 11.6 |

=== Playoffs ===
| Year | Team | GP | GS | MPG | FG% | 3P% | FT% | RPG | APG | SPG | BPG | PPG |
|---|---|---|---|---|---|---|---|---|---|---|---|---|
| 1980 | Milwaukee | 7 | — | 26.0 | **.588** | .000 | .871 | 4.4 | 1.6 | .7 | .1 | 12.4 |
| 1981 | Milwaukee | 7 | — | 39.6 | .435 | .000 | .745 | 6.7 | 2.9 | 1.7 | .4 | 14.0 |
| 1982 | Milwaukee | 6 | — | **42.0** | .419 | .000 | .789 | 5.0 | 4.0 | 1.5 | .3 | 15.3 |
| 1983 | Milwaukee | 9 | — | 41.9 | .437 | .000 | .754 | 6.7 | 3.7 | **2.0** | .3 | 18.9 |
| 1984 | Milwaukee | **16** | — | 38.6 | .518 | .250 | .791 | **6.9** | 4.3 | 1.8 | **.6** | 19.1 |
| 1985 | Milwaukee | 8 | 7 | 39.9 | .556 | .400 | .933 | 4.3 | 5.0 | .6 | .5 | **23.0** |
| 1986 | Milwaukee | 9 | 9 | 36.3 | .426 | .286 | .698 | 4.6 | 4.9 | .6 | **.6** | 16.9 |
| 1987 | Milwaukee | 12 | 10 | 35.5 | .473 | .286 | .811 | 4.5 | 3.0 | 1.1 | .5 | 19.4 |
| 1988 | Milwaukee | 5 | 5 | 34.6 | .480 | **1.000** | **.963** | 3.8 | **5.2** | .6 | .2 | 15.0 |
| 1989 | Milwaukee | 9 | 9 | 20.4 | .396 | .286 | .938 | 2.9 | 1.4 | .6 | .2 | 6.1 |
| 1991 | Atlanta | 5 | 0 | 18.2 | .500 | .167 | .813 | 3.2 | .4 | .6 | .0 | 7.2 |
| Career | | 93 | 40 | 34.7 | .475 | .293 | .811 | 5.0 | 3.4 | 1.1 | .4 | 16.0 |

== Coaching career ==
Moncrief was the head coach at the University of Arkansas-Little Rock for one season, 1999–2000. The Trojans finished with a record of 4 wins and 24 losses.

In 2006, Moncrief returned to basketball as the head coach of the Fort Worth Flyers, a professional basketball team in the NBA D-League.

He rejoined the NBA in October 2007 when he became the shooting coach for the Golden State Warriors.

He rejoined the CBA in January 2009 when he became the assistant coach for the Beijing Ducks.

In 2011, he returned to the Milwaukee Bucks as an assistant coach.

== Broadcasting career ==
It was announced in July 2013 that Moncrief would analyze and commentate Bucks games for FSN Wisconsin.

== Post-playing career ==
=== Books authored ===
- Moncrief: My Journey to the NBA (1990, with Myra McLarey) ISBN 9780874831139
- Your Passport to Becoming a Valuable Team Player: Your Travel Guide for Peak Performance at Work and Home (2012, with Kisha Wetherall) ISBN 9780983828518

== Personal life ==
Moncrief has four sons. Moncrief's son Brett was a wide receiver for Mississippi Gulf Coast Community College and Troy University. His nephew Albrey Battle played eight seasons in the Arena Football League and for the San Francisco Demons of the XFL.

Upon retiring for the first time in 1989, Moncrief opened Sidney Moncrief's Buick, a car dealership in Sherwood, Arkansas. He also later owned a Ford dealership in Blytheville, Arkansas.

Looking back on his career in March 2021, Moncrief said "I have a greater appreciation for the accomplishments and the awards [now] then when I played the game of basketball. When I played the game, it was like: 'Okay. You are an All-Star. Okay, cool. You are a Defensive Player of the Year. Okay'. I never really thought about it. When you retire, and you have time to reflect upon your career, I started to have a greater appreciation for what I was able to accomplish."

On May 15, 2021, Moncrief spoke at the posthumous Hall of Fame enshrinement of his former coach Eddie Sutton.

== See also ==
- List of NCAA Division I men's basketball players with 2000 points and 1000 rebounds
