= 1981–82 Boston Celtics season =

NBA basketball team season

- Division champions
- Head coach: Bill Fitch
- General manager: Red Auerbach
- Arena: Boston Garden; Hartford Civic Center

Results
- Record: 63–19 (.768)
- Place: Division: 1st (Atlantic); Conference: 1st (Eastern)
- Playoff finish: Eastern Conference finals (lost to 76ers 3–4)
- Stats at Basketball Reference

Local media
- Television: PRISM New England, WBZ, WATR
- Radio: WRKO, WTIC

The 1981–82 Boston Celtics season was the 36th season of the Boston Celtics in the National Basketball Association (NBA). The Celtics entered the season as the defending NBA champions. They finished the season with the best record in the NBA.

Boston was notably defeated in a seven-game series with their bitter rivals, the Philadelphia 76ers; in the final game, with the contest well decided, fans chanted "Beat L.A.," helping kick off one of American sports' most famous fan chants.

== Draft picks ==
Round	Pick	Player	Position	Nationality	College
1	23	Charles Bradley	SG	United States	Wyoming–Sr.
5	95	Glen Grunwald	C	United States	Indiana

== Roster ==
1981–82 Boston Celtics roster
Players

Pos.	No.	Player	Height	Weight	DOB	From
SG	44	Danny Ainge	6 ft 4 in (1.93 m)	175 lb (79 kg)	1959–03–17	BYU
PG	7	Nate Archibald	6 ft 1 in (1.85 m)	150 lb (68 kg)	1948–09–02	UTEP
PF	33	Larry Bird	6 ft 9 in (2.06 m)	220 lb (100 kg)	1956–12–07	Indiana State
SG	35	Charles Bradley	6 ft 5 in (1.96 m)	215 lb (98 kg)	1959–05–16	Wyoming
SF	30	M. L. Carr	6 ft 6 in (1.98 m)	205 lb (93 kg)	1951–01–09	Guilford
SG	40	Terry Duerod	6 ft 2 in (1.88 m)	180 lb (82 kg)	1956–07–29	Detroit Mercy
C	45	Eric Fernsten	6 ft 10 in (2.08 m)	205 lb (93 kg)	1953–11–01	San Francisco
SG	42	Chris Ford	6 ft 5 in (1.96 m)	190 lb (86 kg)	1949–01–11	Villanova
PG	43	Gerald Henderson	6 ft 2 in (1.88 m)	175 lb (79 kg)	1956–01–16	VCU
SF	31	Cedric Maxwell	6 ft 8 in (2.03 m)	205 lb (93 kg)	1955–11–21	Charlotte
PF	32	Kevin McHale	6 ft 10 in (2.08 m)	210 lb (95 kg)	1957–12–19	Minnesota
C	00	Robert Parish	7 ft 1 in (2.16 m)	230 lb (104 kg)	1953–08–30	Centenary
C	53	Rick Robey	6 ft 11 in (2.11 m)	230 lb (104 kg)	1956–01–30	Kentucky

Coaches
Head coach
- Bill Fitch
Assistant(s)
- K. C. Jones
- Jimmy Rodgers

Legend
- (DP) Unsigned draft pick
- (FA) Free agent
- (S) Suspended
- (L) On leave from the team
- Injured

Roster

== Regular season ==
=== Season standings ===
Atlantic Division	W	L	PCT	GB	Home	Road	Div
y-Boston Celtics	63	19	.768	–	35–6	28–13	20–4
x-Philadelphia 76ers	58	24	.707	5.0	32–9	26–15	16–8
x-New Jersey Nets	44	38	.537	19.0	25–16	19–22	12–12
x-Washington Bullets	43	39	.524	20.0	22–19	21–20	7–17
New York Knicks	33	49	.402	30.0	19–22	14–27	5–19

#	Eastern Conference				
#	Team	W	L	PCT	GB
1	z-Boston Celtics	63	19	.768	–
2	y-Milwaukee Bucks	55	27	.671	8
3	x-Philadelphia 76ers	58	24	.707	5
4	x-New Jersey Nets	44	38	.537	19
5	x-Washington Bullets	43	39	.524	20
6	x-Atlanta Hawks	42	40	.512	21
7	Detroit Pistons	39	43	.476	24
8	Indiana Pacers	35	47	.427	28
9	Chicago Bulls	34	48	.415	29
10	New York Knicks	33	49	.402	30
11	Cleveland Cavaliers	15	67	.183	48

== Game log ==
=== Regular season ===
1981–82 game log
Total: 63–19 (home: 35–6; road: 28–13)
October: 1–1 (home: 1–0; road: 0–1)

Game	Date	Team	Score	High points	High rebounds	High assists	Location Attendance	Record
1	October 30	Washington	W 124–100				Boston Garden	1–0
2	October 31	@ Milwaukee	L 103–119				MECCA Arena	1–1

November: 12–1 (home: 7–1; road: 5–0)

Game	Date	Team	Score	High points	High rebounds	High assists	Location Attendance	Record
3	November 4	Chicago	W 115–93				Boston Garden	2–1
4	November 6	Indiana	W 111–94				Boston Garden	3–1
5	November 7	@ Detroit	W 129–88				Pontiac Silverdome	4–1
6	November 10	@ Washington	W 90–84				Capital Centre	5–1
7	November 11	Kansas City	W 115–100				Boston Garden	6–1
8	November 13	New Jersey	W 111–97				Hartford Civic Center	7–1
9	November 14	@ Cleveland	W 92–91				Richfield Coliseum	8–1
10	November 17	@ Chicago	W 98–95				Chicago Stadium	9–1
11	November 18	Houston	L 104–106				Boston Garden	9–2
12	November 20	Milwaukee	W 112–89				Boston Garden	10–2
13	November 25	Golden State	W 122–101				Boston Garden	11–2
14	November 27	Washington	W 113–100				Boston Garden	12–2
15	November 28	@ Atlanta	W 98–90				The Omni	13–2

December: 9–5 (home: 6–0; road: 3–5)

Game	Date	Team	Score	High points	High rebounds	High assists	Location Attendance	Record
16	December 1	@ Indiana	L 87–90				Market Square Arena	13–3
17	December 2	Detroit	W 115–114				Boston Garden	14–3
18	December 4	Philadelphia	W 111–103				Boston Garden	15–3
19	December 5	@ New York	L 83–103				Madison Square Garden	15–4
20	December 9	New Jersey	W 109–100				Boston Garden	16–4
21	December 11	Atlanta	W 94–86				Hartford Civic Center	17–4
22	December 12	@ Atlanta	L 97–108				The Omni	17–5
23	December 16	Dallas	W 109–92				Boston Garden	18–5
24	December 18	@ Washington	W 99–98				Capital Centre	19–5
25	December 19	@ Philadelphia	L 118–123 (OT)				The Spectrum	19–6
26	December 22	Cleveland	W 120–116				Boston Garden	20–6
27	December 26	@ Kansas City	W 124–119 (OT)				Kemper Arena	21–6
28	December 29	@ Denver	L 123–128				McNichols Sports Arena	21–7
29	December 30	@ Utah	W 121–110				Salt Palace Acord Arena	22–7

January: 10–4 (home: 5–3; road: 5–1)

Game	Date	Team	Score	High points	High rebounds	High assists	Location Attendance	Record
30	January 2	@ Cleveland	W 106–103				Richfield Coliseum	22–8
31	January 6	Chicago	L 102–116				Boston Garden	23–8
32	January 8	Philadelphia	W 96–90				Boston Garden	24–8
33	January 10	Detroit	W 134–124				Hartford Civic Center	25–8
34	January 11	@ New Jersey	W 112–94				Brendan Byrne Arena	26–8
35	January 13	Atlanta	W 116–95				Boston Garden	27–8
36	January 15	@ Milwaukee	L 118–122				MECCA Arena	27–9
37	January 16	@ Detroit	W 128–120				Pontiac Silverdome	28–9
38	January 19	@ New York	W 111–107				Madison Square Garden	29–9
39	January 20	Indiana	W 112–103				Boston Garden	30–9
40	January 22	Seattle	L 106–118				Boston Garden	30–10
41	January 24	Portland	L 119–123				Boston Garden	30–11
42	January 27	New York	W 131–99				Boston Garden	31–11
43	January 28	@ Cleveland	W 116–104				Richfield Coliseum	32–11

February: 8–4 (home: 4–1; road: 4–3)

Game	Date	Team	Score	High points	High rebounds	High assists	Location Attendance	Record
44	February 2	@ Indiana	W 109–105				Market Square Arena	33–11
45	February 5	Denver	W 145–144				Boston Garden	34–11
46	February 7	Los Angeles	L 113–119				Boston Garden	34–12
47	February 10	@ Phoenix	L 110–112				Arizona Veterans Memorial Coliseum	34–13
48	February 12	@ San Diego	W 129–116				San Diego Sports Arena	35–13
49	February 14	@ Los Angeles	W 108–103				The Forum	36–13
50	February 17	@ Golden State	L 105–121				Oakland–Alameda County Coliseum Arena	36–14
51	February 19	@ Portland	W 127–117				Memorial Coliseum	37–14
52	February 21	@ Seattle	L 100–103				Kingdome	37–15
53	February 24	Utah	W 132–90				Boston Garden	38–15
54	February 26	San Diego	W 122–110				Boston Garden	39–15
55	February 28	Milwaukee	W 106–102				Boston Garden	40–15

March: 16–1 (home: 8–1; road: 8–0)

Game	Date	Team	Score	High points	High rebounds	High assists	Location Attendance	Record
56	March 2	@ Dallas	W 101–97				Reunion Arena	41–15
58	March 5	@ Houston	W 100–98				The Summit	43–15
59	March 7	New York	W 107–106				Boston Garden	44–15
60	March 8	@ Detroit	W 111–101				Pontiac Silverdome	45–15
61	March 10	Indiana	W 121–100				Boston Garden	46–15
62	March 12	@ New Jersey	W 113–109				Brendan Byrne Arena	47–15
63	March 14	Phoenix	W 105–92				Boston Garden	48–15
64	March 16	@ Washington	W 98–97 (OT)				Capital Centre	49–15
65	March 17	Atlanta	W 113–109				Boston Garden	50–15
67	March 21	@ Philadelphia	W 123–111				The Spectrum	52–15
68	March 23	@ Chicago	W 110–103				Chicago Stadium	53–15
69	March 24	Cleveland	W 136–115				Boston Garden	54–15
70	March 26	Detroit	W 125–104				Boston Garden	55–15
71	March 28	Philadelphia	L 98–116				Boston Garden	55–16
72	March 31	Washington	W 119–109				Boston Garden	56–16

April: 7–3 (home: 4–0; road: 3–3)

Game	Date	Team	Score	High points	High rebounds	High assists	Location Attendance	Record
73	April 2	@ Atlanta	W 110–107				The Omni	57–16
74	April 4	Chicago	W 114–112				Boston Garden	58–16
75	April 6	@ Milwaukee	L 116–122				MECCA Arena	58–17
76	April 8	@ New York	W 110–106				Madison Square Garden	59–17
77	April 9	New Jersey	W 106–103				Boston Garden	60–17
78	April 11	@ Philadelphia	W 110–109 (OT)				The Spectrum	61–17
79	April 13	@ Chicago	L 115–120				Chicago Stadium	61–18
80	April 14	Milwaukee	W 100–91				Boston Garden	62–18
81	April 16	@ New Jersey	L 96–113				Brendan Byrne Arena	62–19
82	April 18	New York	W 119–99				Boston Garden	63–19

1981–82 schedule

=== Playoffs ===
1982 playoff game log
Conference semifinals: 4–1 (home: 2–1; road: 2–0)

Game	Date	Team	Score	High points	High rebounds	High assists	Location Attendance	Series
1	April 25	Washington	W 109–91	M. L. Carr (21)	Larry Bird (12)	Tiny Archibald (7)	Boston Garden; 15,320	1–0
2	April 28	Washington	L 102–103	Larry Bird (26)	Bird, Parish (10)	Tiny Archibald (6)	Boston Garden; 15,320	1–1
3	May 1	@ Washington	W 92–83	Robert Parish (25)	Parish, Archibald (13)	Tiny Archibald (5)	Capital Centre; 15,035	2–1
4	May 2	@ Washington	W 103–99 (OT)	Robert Parish (28)	Robert Parish (15)	Tiny Archibald (4)	Capital Centre; 16,295	3–1
5	May 5	Washington	W 131–126 (2OT)	Robert Parish (33)	Robert Parish (13)	Tiny Archibald (11)	Boston Garden; 15,320	4–1

Conference finals: 3–4 (home: 2–2; road: 1–2)

Game	Date	Team	Score	High points	High rebounds	High assists	Location Attendance	Series
1	May 9	Philadelphia	W 121–81	Bird, Parish (24)	Larry Bird (15)	Larry Bird (10)	Boston Garden; 15,320	1–0
2	May 12	Philadelphia	L 113–121	Tiny Archibald (24)	Larry Bird (14)	Tiny Archibald (13)	Boston Garden; 15,320	1–1
3	May 15	@ Philadelphia	L 97–99	Cedric Maxwell (18)	Larry Bird (13)	Larry Bird (11)	Spectrum; 18,364	1–2
4	May 16	@ Philadelphia	L 94–119	Robert Parish (18)	Larry Bird (9)	Gerald Henderson (7)	Spectrum; 18,364	1–3
5	May 19	Philadelphia	W 114–85	Robert Parish (26)	Larry Bird (20)	Larry Bird (8)	Boston Garden; 15,320	2–3
6	May 21	@ Philadelphia	W 88–75	Kevin McHale (17)	Larry Bird (17)	Danny Ainge (7)	Spectrum; 18,364	3–3
7	May 23	Philadelphia	L 106–120	Robert Parish (23)	Robert Parish (14)	Larry Bird (9)	Boston Garden; 15,320	3–4

1982 schedule

== Awards and honors ==
- Larry Bird, All-NBA First Team

== See also ==
- 1981–82 NBA season
