= Garry Witts =

American basketball player (born 1959)

Personal information
- Born: July 3, 1959 (age 67) Elizabeth, New Jersey, U.S.
- Listed height: 6 ft 7 in (2.01 m)
- Listed weight: 190 lb (86 kg)

Career information
- High school: St. Joseph (Metuchen, New Jersey)
- College: Holy Cross (1977–1981)
- NBA draft: 1981: 5th round, 103rd overall pick
- Drafted by: Washington Bullets
- Playing career: 1981–1983
- Position: Small forward
- Number: 20

Career history
- 1981–1982: Washington Bullets
- 1982–1983: Maine Lumberjacks
- Stats at NBA.com
- Stats at Basketball Reference

Garrett David Witts (born July 3, 1959) is an American former professional basketball player. He played in 46 games for the Washington Bullets in the National Basketball Association during the 1981–82 season. He scored 132 career points in the NBA.

== Career statistics ==
Legend
GP	Games played	GS	Games started	MPG	Minutes per game
FG%	Field goal percentage	3P%	3-point field goal percentage	FT%	Free throw percentage
RPG	Rebounds per game	APG	Assists per game	SPG	Steals per game
BPG	Blocks per game	PPG	Points per game	**Bold**	Career high

=== NBA ===
==== Regular season ====
Year	Team	GP	GS	MPG	FG%	3P%	FT%	RPG	APG	SPG	BPG	PPG
1981–82	Washington	46	0	10.7	.583	.500	.825	1.3	.8	.4	.1	2.9

==== Playoffs ====
Year	Team	GP	MPG	FG%	3P%	FT%	RPG	APG	SPG	BPG	PPG
1982	Washington	4	7.0	1.000	–	.500	.8	.5	.3	.0	1.3
