= 1981–82 Washington Bullets season =

NBA professional basketball team season

- Head coach: Gene Shue
- General manager: Bob Ferry
- Owner: Abe Pollin
- Arena: Capital Centre

Results
- Record: 43–39 (.524)
- Place: Division: 4th (Atlantic); Conference: 5th (Eastern)
- Playoff finish: Conference semifinals (lost to Celtics 1–4)
- Stats at Basketball Reference

Local media
- Television: WDCA
- Radio: WTOP

The 1981–82 Washington Bullets season was the Bullets’ 21st season in the NBA and their ninth in the city of Washington, D.C. This for first since 1967–68 season Wes Unseld was not on the opening day roster. The Bullets finished 43–39 and won their first playoff round against the New Jersey Nets. They lost the semifinals to a powerful Boston Celtic outfit and their Nets win would prove their last playoff series win until 2004–05 against the Chicago Bulls.

== Draft picks ==
Round	Pick	Player	Position	Nationality	College
1	11	Frank Johnson	PG	United States	Wake Forest
2	35	Charles Davis	SF	United States	Vanderbilt
2	41	Claude Gregory	PF	United States	Wisconsin
2	44	Steve Lingenfelter	PF	United States	South Dakota State
3	48	Mike Ferrara		United States	Colgate
4	79	Ron Davis		United States	Arizona
5	103	Garry Witts		United States	Holy Cross
6	125	Robert Williams		United States	Grambling State
7	149	Randy Martel		United States	Houston Baptist
8	170	Mike Howard		United States	Wofford
9	193	Eddie Brown		United States	Valdosta State
10	212	Ralton Way		United States	Houston Baptist

== Roster ==
1981–82 Washington Bullets roster
Players

Pos.	No.	Player	Height	Weight	DOB	From
F	42	Greg Ballard	6 ft 7 in (2.01 m)	215 lb (98 kg)		Oregon
C	9	Jim Chones	6 ft 11 in (2.11 m)	220 lb (100 kg)		Marquette
G/F	22	Don Collins	6 ft 6 in (1.98 m)	190 lb (86 kg)		Washington State
SF	23	Charles Davis	6 ft 7 in (2.01 m)	215 lb (98 kg)		Vanderbilt
F	35	Kevin Grevey	6 ft 5 in (1.96 m)	210 lb (95 kg)		Kentucky
PF	24	Spencer Haywood	6 ft 8 in (2.03 m)	225 lb (102 kg)		Detroit Mercy
PG	15	Frank Johnson	6 ft 1 in (1.85 m)	185 lb (84 kg)		Wake Forest
G	5	John Lucas	6 ft 3 in (1.91 m)	175 lb (79 kg)		Maryland
PF	44	Rick Mahorn	6 ft 10 in (2.08 m)	240 lb (109 kg)		Hampton
PG	1	Kevin Porter	6 ft 0 in (1.83 m)	170 lb (77 kg)		Saint Francis (PA)
C	43	Jeff Ruland	6 ft 10 in (2.08 m)	240 lb (109 kg)		Iona
G	12	Carlos Terry	6 ft 5 in (1.96 m)	210 lb (95 kg)		Winston-Salem State
F	20	Garry Witts	6 ft 9 in (2.06 m)	190 lb (86 kg)		Holy Cross

Coaches
Head coach
- Gene Shue
Assistant(s)
- Bernie Bickerstaff

Legend
- (DP) Unsigned draft pick
- (FA) Free agent
- (S) Suspended
- Injured

== Regular season ==
=== Season standings ===
Atlantic Division	W	L	PCT	GB	Home	Road	Div
y-Boston Celtics	63	19	.768	–	35–6	28–13	20–4
x-Philadelphia 76ers	58	24	.707	5.0	32–9	26–15	16–8
x-New Jersey Nets	44	38	.537	19.0	25–16	19–22	12–12
x-Washington Bullets	43	39	.524	20.0	22–19	21–20	7–17
New York Knicks	33	49	.402	30.0	19–22	14–27	5–19

#	Eastern Conference				
#	Team	W	L	PCT	GB
1	z-Boston Celtics	63	19	.768	–
2	y-Milwaukee Bucks	55	27	.671	8
3	x-Philadelphia 76ers	58	24	.707	5
4	x-New Jersey Nets	44	38	.537	19
5	x-Washington Bullets	43	39	.524	20
6	x-Atlanta Hawks	42	40	.512	21
7	Detroit Pistons	39	43	.476	24
8	Indiana Pacers	35	47	.427	28
9	Chicago Bulls	34	48	.415	29
10	New York Knicks	33	49	.402	30
11	Cleveland Cavaliers	15	67	.183	48

Notes

- z, y – division champions
- x – clinched playoff spot

== Game log ==
=== Regular season ===
1981–82 game log
Total: 43–39 (home: 22–19; road: 21–20)
October: 0–1 (home: 0–0; road: 0–1)

Game	Date	Team	Score	High points	High rebounds	High assists	Location Attendance	Record
1	October 30	@ Boston	L 100–124				Boston Garden	0–1

November : 4–9 (home: 3–5; road: 1–4)

Game	Date	Team	Score	High points	High rebounds	High assists	Location Attendance	Record
2	November 3	Philadelphia	L 99–112				Capital Centre	0–2
3	November 5	@ Milwaukee	L 90–98				MECCA Arena	0–3
4	November 6	Detroit	W 86–82				Capital Centre	1–3
5	November 10	Boston	L 84–90				Capital Centre	1–4
6	November 12	@ Atlanta	W 95–87				The Omni	2–4
7	November 14	Chicago	W 104–99				Capital Centre	3–4
8	November 17	Milwaukee	L 95–99				Capital Centre	3–5
9	November 19	@ Detroit	L 97–122				Pontiac Silverdome	3–6
10	November 20	Houston	L 94–95				Capital Centre	3–7
11	November 21	@ Chicago	L 105–117				Chicago Stadium	3–8
12	November 24	Golden State	W 107–88				Capital Centre	4–8
13	November 27	@ Boston	L 100–113				Boston Garden	4–9
14	November 28	Indiana	L 90–92				Capital Centre	4–10

December : 8–7 (home: 3–3; road: 5–4)

Game	Date	Team	Score	High points	High rebounds	High assists	Location Attendance	Record
15	December 1	San Antonio	L 99–110				Capital Centre	4–11
16	December 3	@ New York	W 114–88				Madison Square Garden	5–11
17	December 5	Cleveland	W 94–87				Capital Centre	6–11
18	December 8	@ Los Angeles	L 98–102				The Forum	6–12
19	December 11	@ San Diego	W 106–102				San Diego Sports Arena	7–12
20	December 12	@ Phoenix	W 105–98				Arizona Veterans Memorial Coliseum	8–12
21	December 15	Dallas	L 102–107				Capital Centre	8–13
22	December 16	@ Cleveland	W 106–102				Richfield Coliseum	9–13
23	December 18	Boston	L 98–99				Capital Centre	9–14
24	December 22	@ Chicago	L 90–92				Chicago Stadium	9–15
25	December 25	Indiana	W 115–98				Capital Centre	10–15
26	December 26	@ New Jersey	W 105–90				Brendan Byrne Arena	11–15
27	December 29	Detroit	W 129–125				Capital Centre	12–15
28	December 30	@ Milwaukee	L 103–107				MECCA Arena	12–16

January : 10–4 (home: 5–3; road: 5–1)

Game	Date	Team	Score	High points	High rebounds	High assists	Location Attendance	Record
29	January 2	@ Indiana	W 107–103				Market Square Arena	13–16
30	January 5	New Jersey	L 108–114				Capital Centre	13–17
31	January 6	@ Philadelphia	L 112–116				The Spectrum	13–18
32	January 7	@ Cleveland	W 109–100				Richfield Coliseum	14–18
33	January 10	@ New York	W 129–126 (OT)				Madison Square Garden	15–18
34	January 12	Philadelphia	L 92–95				Capital Centre	15–19
35	January 14	@ Detroit	W 121–114				Pontiac Silverdome	16–19
36	January 15	Chicago	W 93–90				Capital Centre	17–19
37	January 17	Atlanta	W 96–78				Capital Centre	18–19
38	January 20	Seattle	W 106–95				Capital Centre	19–19
39	January 22	Portland	W 110–97				Capital Centre	20–19
41	January 23	@ Kansas City	W 109–106 (OT)				Kemper Arena	21–19
41	January 26	Chicago	W 94–84				Capital Centre	22–19
42	January 28	New York	L 98–102				Capital Centre	22–20
All-Star Break

February : 5–8 (home: 2–4; road: 3–4)

Game	Date	Team	Score	High points	High rebounds	High assists	Location Attendance	Record
43	February 2	Cleveland	L 99–100				Capital Centre	22–21
44	February 3	@ Philadelphia	L 96–122				The Spectrum	22–22
45	February 5	Los Angeles	L 87–90				Capital Centre	22–23
46	February 7	Denver	L 115–124				Capital Centre	22–24
47	February 9	@ San Antonio	W 112–110				HemisFair Arena	23–24
48	February 10	@ Dallas	W 119–102				Reunion Arena	24–24
49	February 13	@ Houston	L 104–111				The Summit	24–25
50	February 16	@ Portland	W 100–97				Memorial Coliseum	25–25
51	February 18	@ Seattle	L 87–105				Kingdome	25–26
52	February 20	@ Golden State	L 102–110				Oakland–Alameda County Coliseum Arena	25–27
53	February 23	Utah	L 106–113				Capital Centre	25–28
54	February 26	Kansas City	W 100–98				Capital Centre	26–28
55	February 28	New York	W 113–109 (OT)				Capital Centre	27–28

March : 10–7 (home: 6–3; road: 4–4)

Game	Date	Team	Score	High points	High rebounds	High assists	Location Attendance	Record
56	March 2	New Jersey	L 124–130 (2OT)				Capital Centre	27–29
57	March 5	@ Denver	L 126–127				McNichols Sports Arena	27–30
58	March 6	@ Utah	W 127–113				Salt Palace Acord Arena	28–30
59	March 9	Phoenix	L 95–103				Capital Centre	28–31
60	March 12	Indiana	W 110–105				Capital Centre	29–31
61	March 13	@ New York	W 109–99				Madison Square Garden	30–31
62	March 14	Atlanta	W 92–85				Capital Centre	31–31
63	March 16	Boston	L 97–98 (OT)				Capital Centre	31–32
64	March 17	@ Philadelphia	L 93–102				The Spectrum	31–33
65	March 19	San Diego	W 108–98				Capital Centre	32–33
66	March 21	New York	W 110–109				Capital Centre	33–33
67	March 23	@ Atlanta	L 87–107				The Omni	33–34
68	March 24	@ Indiana	W 114–106				Market Square Arena	34–34
69	March 26	New Jersey	W 104–88				Capital Centre	35–34
70	March 28	@ Cleveland	W 104–101				Richfield Coliseum	36–34
71	March 30	Detroit	W 127–98				Capital Centre	37–34
72	March 31	@ Boston	L 109–119				Boston Garden	37–35

April : 6–4 (home: 3–1; road: 3–3)

Game	Date	Team	Score	High points	High rebounds	High assists	Location Attendance	Record
73	April 2	@ New Jersey	L 96–98				Brendan Byrne Arena	37–36
74	April 3	@ Atlanta	L 101–106				The Omni	37–37
75	April 6	Cleveland	W 94–85				Capital Centre	38–37
76	April 7	@ Indiana	W 97–85				Market Square Arena	39–37
77	April 9	@ Chicago	W 114–98				Chicago Stadium	40–37
78	April 10	Milwaukee	W 115–114				Capital Centre	41–37
79	April 13	@ Milwaukee	W 109–99				MECCA Arena	42–37
80	April 14	@ New Jersey	L 94–98				Brendan Byrne Arena	42–38
81	April 16	Philadelphia	L 96–100				Capital Centre	42–39
82	April 18	Atlanta	W 99–96				Capital Centre	43–39

1981–82 schedule

=== Playoffs ===
1982 playoff game log
Eastern Conference First Round: 2–0 (home: 1–0; road: 1–0)

Game	Date	Team	Score	High points	High rebounds	High assists	Location Attendance	Series
1	April 20	@ New Jersey	W 96–83	Jeff Ruland (18)	Jeff Ruland (20)	Frank Johnson (11)	Brendan Byrne Arena; 14,015	1–0
2	April 23	New Jersey	W 103–92	Kevin Grevey (23)	Rick Mahorn (11)	Frank Johnson (9)	Capital Centre; 19,035	2–0

Eastern Conference Semifinals: 1–4 (home: 0–2; road: 1–2)

Game	Date	Team	Score	High points	High rebounds	High assists	Location Attendance	Series
1	April 25	@ Boston	L 91–109	Spencer Haywood (17)	Greg Ballard (9)	Frank Johnson (6)	Boston Garden; 15,320	0–1
2	April 28	@ Boston	W 103–102	Johnson, Haywood (26)	Jeff Ruland (10)	Frank Johnson (8)	Boston Garden; 15,320	1–1
3	May 1	Boston	L 83–92	Spencer Haywood (19)	Rick Mahorn (14)	Frank Johnson (8)	Capital Centre; 15,035	1–2
4	May 2	Boston	L 99–103 (OT)	Spencer Haywood (28)	Rick Mahorn (10)	Frank Johnson (7)	Capital Centre; 16,295	1–3
5	May 5	@ Boston	L 126–131 (2OT)	Jeff Ruland (33)	Jeff Ruland (13)	Frank Johnson (10)	Boston Garden; 15,320	1–4

1982 schedule

== Awards and records ==
- Gene Shue, NBA Coach of the Year Award
- Bob Ferry, NBA Executive of the Year Award
- Jeff Ruland, NBA All-Rookie Team 1st Team

== See also ==
- 1981–82 NBA season
