= Frank Johnson (basketball, born 1958) =

American basketball coach and former player

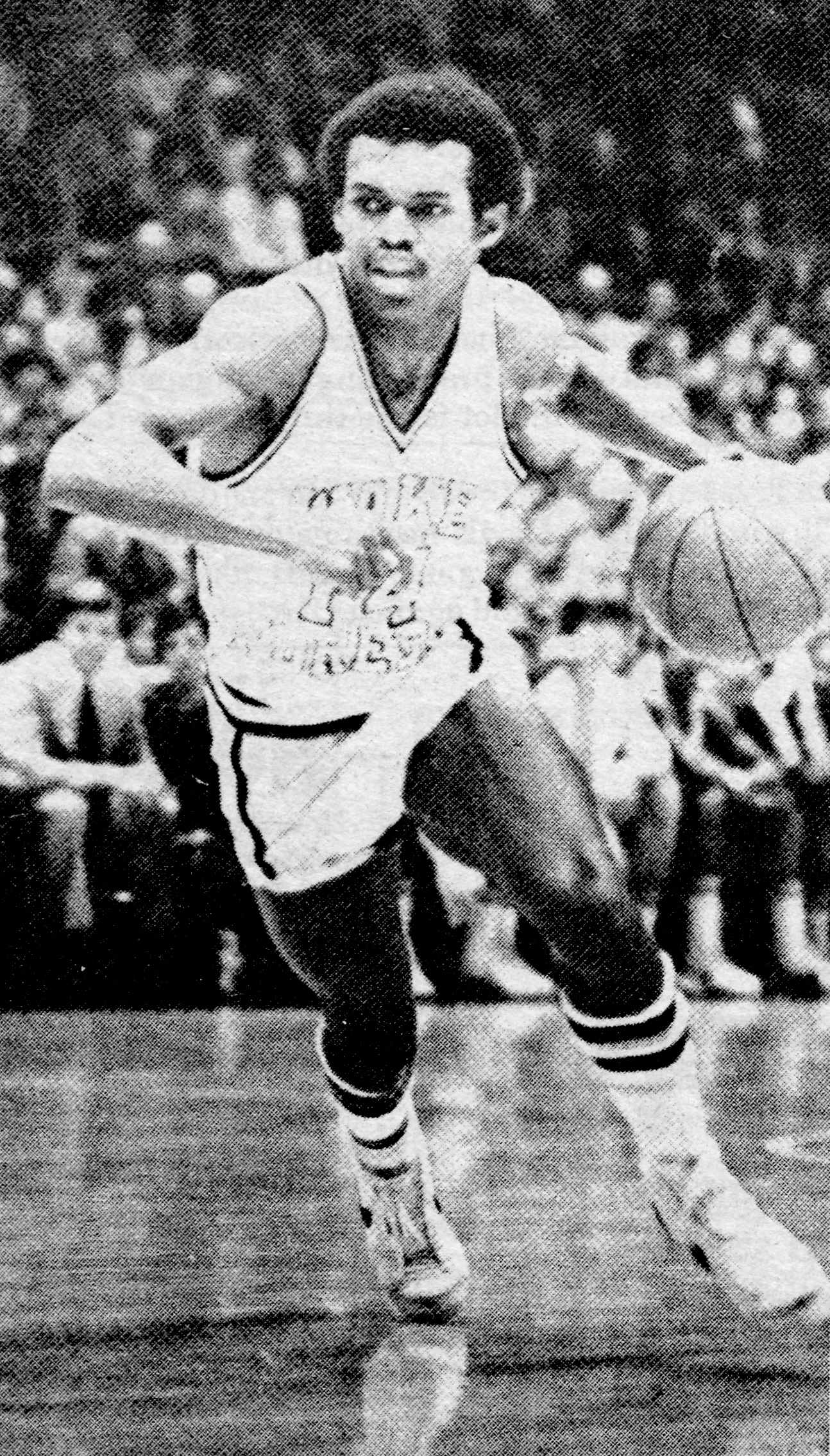
- Johnson with Wake Forest in 1981

Personal information
- Born: November 23, 1958 (age 67) Weirsdale, Florida, U.S.
- Listed height: 6 ft 1 in (1.85 m)
- Listed weight: 185 lb (84 kg)

Career information
- High school: Lake Weir (Summerfield, Florida)
- College: Wake Forest (1976–1981)
- NBA draft: 1981: 1st round, 11th overall pick
- Drafted by: Washington Bullets
- Playing career: 1981–1994
- Position: Point guard
- Number: 15, 3

Career history

Playing
- 1981–1988: Washington Bullets
- 1988–1989: Houston Rockets
- 1989–1991: A. Ranger Varese
- 1991: Marr Rimini
- 1991–1992: Olympique Antibes
- 1992–1994: Phoenix Suns

Career highlights
- First-team All-ACC (1981); 2× Second-team All-ACC (1978, 1979)

Career NBA statistics
- Points: 4,937 (8.3 ppg)
- Rebounds: 1,025 (1.7 rpg)
- Assists: 2,476 (4.2 apg)
- Stats at NBA.com
- Stats at Basketball Reference

Franklin Lenard Johnson (born November 23, 1958) is an American former professional basketball player and coach. He played ten seasons in the National Basketball Association (NBA) for the Washington Bullets, Houston Rockets and Phoenix Suns.

== Early days ==
Johnson played high school basketball for the Lake Weir Hurricanes. During his junior year in 1974–1975, he was a star for the 33–0 Hurricanes team that won Marion County's first state championship.

== College career ==
Johnson played collegiately for Wake Forest University, becoming an All-American selection in 1980–81. He was inducted into the school's hall of fame in 1998.

== Professional career ==
Johnson was selected in the first round of the 1981 NBA draft with the 11th pick by the Washington Bullets. He played point guard in the NBA for the Bullets (1981–1988), the Houston Rockets (1988–89) (he signed as a free agent with the New Jersey Nets, but they traded him to the Rockets before he played in any games for them). He also played for the Phoenix Suns (1992–94) where his main role was to relieve star Kevin Johnson (no relation). He was selected from the Rockets by the Orlando Magic in the 1989 expansion draft, but was waived before the 1989–90 season started. He played 650 games in the NBA (regular season and playoffs), with regular season career averages of 8.3 PPG and 4.2 APG in 21.6 minutes.

=== International career ===
He played professionally in Italy for Ranger Varese (1989–91, played in the finals of the Italian Championship in 1990) and Marr Rimini (Serie A2, 1991).

== Coaching career ==
Johnson coached the Phoenix Suns for almost two seasons beginning February 17, 2002, before he was fired on December 10, 2003, and replaced by assistant Mike D'Antoni. The official reason for the firing was routine—the team had performed poorly in 2003-04—but an article in the Arizona Republic reported that some of Johnson's personal behavior caused a minor scandal for the Suns ownership. He had worked as an assistant coach with the Suns beginning late in the 1996–97 season under Danny Ainge and Scott Skiles before being promoted.

== Career playing statistics ==
Legend
GP	Games played	GS	Games started	MPG	Minutes per game
FG%	Field goal percentage	3P%	3-point field goal percentage	FT%	Free throw percentage
RPG	Rebounds per game	APG	Assists per game	SPG	Steals per game
BPG	Blocks per game	PPG	Points per game	**Bold**	Career high
*	Led the league

=== NBA ===
==== Regular season ====
Year	Team	GP	GS	MPG	FG%	3P%	FT%	RPG	APG	SPG	BPG	PPG
1981–82	Washington	79	29	25.7	.414	.215	.750	1.9	4.8	1.0	**.1**	10.7
1982–83	Washington	68	65	**34.2**	.408	.230	.751	**2.6**	**8.1**	**1.6**	**.1**	12.5
1983–84	Washington	**82***	**81**	32.8	.467	.256	.742	2.2	6.9	1.2	**.1**	12.0
1984–85	Washington	46	1	20.1	**.489**	**.353**	.750	1.4	3.1	.9	**.1**	9.3
1985–86	Washington	14	9	28.7	.448	.000	.704	2.0	5.4	.8	**.1**	**12.6**
1986–87	Washington	18	0	22.2	.461	.000	.714	1.7	3.2	1.2	.0	8.5
1987–88	Washington	75	17	16.8	.434	.111	**.812**	1.6	2.5	.9	**.1**	7.4
1988–89	Houston	67	0	13.1	.443	.167	.806	1.2	2.7	.6	.0	4.4
1992–93	Phoenix	77	0	14.6	.436	.083	.776	1.5	2.4	.8	**.1**	4.3
1993–94	Phoenix	70	5	12.5	.448	.167	.783	1.2	2.1	.6	.0	4.6
Career		596	217	21.6	.439	.218	.760	1.7	4.2	1.0	.1	8.3

==== Playoffs ====
Year	Team	GP	GS	MPG	FG%	3P%	FT%	RPG	APG	SPG	BPG	PPG
1982	Washington	7		**40.0**	.385	**.417**	.857	3.1	**8.4**	**1.4**	.0	**15.6**
1984	Washington	4		39.0	**.571**	.333	**1.000**	**3.3**	6.3	**1.3**	.0	14.3
1985	Washington	2	0	19.5	.286	.167	**1.000**	2.0	3.5	1.0	.0	7.5
1987	Washington	3	0	9.3	.286	–	**1.000**	.7	1.7	.3	.0	2.7
1988	Washington	5	0	8.8	.318	.000	**1.000**	.4	.2	.8	.0	3.6
1989	Houston	4	0	9.0	.333	.000	.600	1.3	1.8	.3	.0	2.5
1993	Phoenix	**22**	0	7.8	.440	.333	.862	.5	.8	.3	.0	3.2
1994	Phoenix	7	0	6.6	.083	.000	.500	.6	.7	.3	.0	.4
Career		54	0	14.8	.397	.276	.857	1.2	2.3	.6	.0	5.4

== Head coaching record ==
Legend
Regular season	G	Games coached	W	Games won	L	Games lost	W–L %	Win–loss %
Playoffs	PG	Playoff games	PW	Playoff wins	PL	Playoff losses	PW–L %	Playoff win–loss %

Team	Year	G	W	L	W–L%	Finish	PG	PW	PL	PW–L%	Result
Phoenix	2001–02	31	11	20	.355	6th in Midwest	—	—	—	—	Missed playoffs
Phoenix	2002–03	82	44	38	.537	4th in Midwest	6	2	4	.333	Lost in First round
Phoenix	2003–04	21	8	13	.381	(fired)	—	—	—	—	—
Career		134	63	71	.470		6	2	4	.333	

== Personal life ==
Frank earned his nickname "Fourth Quarter Frank" for his clutch performances helping the 1992–93 Suns grind out close games.

=== Family ===
Johnson's elder brother Edward also played in the NBA. "Fast Eddie" spent more than eight seasons with the Atlanta Hawks, and closed out his career with stints in Cleveland and Seattle. Eddie was a two-time (1980, 1981) All-Star while with the Hawks.
