= Charles Davis (basketball, born 1958) =

American basketball player

Personal information
- Born: October 5, 1958 (age 68) Nashville, Tennessee, U.S.
- Listed height: 6 ft 7 in (2.01 m)
- Listed weight: 225 lb (102 kg)

Career information
- High school: McGavock (Nashville, Tennessee)
- College: Vanderbilt (1976–1981)
- NBA draft: 1981: 2nd round, 35th overall pick
- Drafted by: Washington Bullets
- Playing career: 1981–1990
- Position: Small forward
- Number: 23, 24, 22

Career history
- 1981–1984: Washington Bullets
- 1984–1986: Milwaukee Bucks
- 1986–1987: Scavolini Pesaro
- 1987: Milwaukee Bucks
- 1987: San Antonio Spurs
- 1988–1990: Chicago Bulls

Career highlights
- Second-team All-SEC (1979)

Career NBA statistics
- Points: 2,214 (5.3 ppg)
- Rebounds: 1,008 (2.4 rpg)
- Assists: 309 (0.7 apg)
- Stats at NBA.com
- Stats at Basketball Reference

Charles Edward Davis Jr. (born October 5, 1958) is an American former professional basketball player.

== Early life ==
Davis was born on October 5, 1958, in Nashville, Tennessee, and grew up in the housing projects of Nashville. He attended McGavock High School in Nashville. Davis led the McGavock High School Raiders to a 25–6 record and victory in the Class AAA Tennessee State Championship in 1976. He was selected Most Valuable Player in the championship tournament.

== College basketball ==
Davis attended Vanderbilt University (1976-81) and starred on its basketball team, graduating in 1981. He led the team in rebounding each of his four full years playing, and led it in scoring twice. In 1978, he was selected third-team All-Southeastern Conference (SEC), and in 1979 was first-team All-SEC. He once held the school's record for career field goals, and is ninth (as of 2025) in all-time career scoring at Vanderbilt. He had a redshirt year (1979-80) due to injuries.

Together with teammate Mike Rhodes, they were known as "Town and Country". Davis and Rhodes jointly held the school's career field goal record (683) for over 25 years, until it was broken by Shan Foster in the 2007-08 season. Davis was at odds with head coach Richard Schmidt (who came in during Davis's redshirt year) over Davis playing with an injury. Davis has stated that Schmidt limited Davis's play the following year, which kept Davis from the all-time Vanderbilt scoring record at the time. Schmidt stated that he believed it was better for the team to give his younger players more playing time, and that was the reason for limiting both Davis's and Rhodes's playing time in their senior year.

== Professional basketball ==
A 6 ft 7 in (201 cm) 215 lb (97 kg) small forward, he was selected in the second round of the 1981 NBA draft by the Washington Bullets and played eight seasons in the National Basketball Association (NBA) as a member of the Bullets, Milwaukee Bucks, San Antonio Spurs, and Chicago Bulls.

After three full years with the Bullets, Davis was waived in November 1984, and signed with Milwaukee less than a week later. He played with the Bucks through the 1985-86 season. Davis did not play in the NBA during the 1986-87 season. In November 1987, the Bucks traded him along with a second round draft pick to the Spurs for Larry Krystkowiak. The Spurs waived him in December 1987, and he signed with the Bulls as a free agent in September 1988. Davis played his final two NBA seasons in Chicago (1988-90), on teams led by Michael Jordan. He also spent time playing professional basketball in Italy and Japan.

On March 18, 1986, in perhaps his most notable game as a professional, Davis led the Bucks to a win while scoring 26 points and grabbing 10 rebounds in only 26 minutes of playing time, in a 116–87 victory over the Washington Bullets. Davis scored 2,214 points and grabbed 1,008 rebounds in his NBA career. He played in a total of 49 playoff games over six different seasons.

== Personal life ==
While still an NBA player, Davis established The Charles Davis Foundation, to provide educational, athletic, and vocational instruction for Nashville inner-city children. Thousands of children have been served by the foundation over the decades. He also served as its executive director. In 1999, he was chairman of the board of Innovative Technology Systems.

Davis is the cousin of former Vanderbilt women's basketball player Jessica Mooney, who grew her basketball skills at the Charles Davis basketball camps in the summer. Davis and his wife Toni were inspirations to Mooney.

== Honors and awards ==
Davis has received the following awards and honors, among others;

- The NCAA Silver Anniversary Award (2006)
- Tennessee Sports Hall of Fame (1998)
- Vanderbilt Athletics Hall of Fame (2009)
- Nashville Sports Council Community Spirit Award (2000)
- Recognized both on the local and national levels for his public service work
- Reese. L. Smith, Jr. Achievement and Community Service Award (1994)
- Tennessee Role Model of the Year from Taxpayers for a Better America (1994)
- Nominated for President George H. Bush’s “Thousand Points of Light” Award (1992)
- A street near the housing projects where he grew up now bears his name

== NBA career statistics ==
Legend
GP	Games played	GS	Games started	MPG	Minutes per game
FG%	Field goal percentage	3P%	3-point field goal percentage	FT%	Free throw percentage
RPG	Rebounds per game	APG	Assists per game	SPG	Steals per game
BPG	Blocks per game	PPG	Points per game	**Bold**	Career high

=== Regular season ===
Year	Team	GP	GS	MPG	FG%	3P%	FT%	RPG	APG	SPG	BPG	PPG
1981–82	Washington	54	**10**	10.6	**.478**	.000	.811	2.5	0.6	0.2	0.2	3.8
1982–83	Washington	**74**	**10**	**15.7**	.470	.200	.629	2.9	1.0	0.4	**0.3**	7.6
1983–84	Washington	46	0	10.2	.472	.111	.615	2.2	0.7	0.3	0.2	5.0
1984–85	Washington	4	0	7.0	.200	.000	.750	1.0	0.3	0.3	0.0	1.8
1984–85	Milwaukee	57	2	13.1	.436	.100	.828	2.6	0.9	0.4	0.1	6.2
1985–86	Milwaukee	57	7	15.3	.474	.125	.813	**3.0**	1.0	**0.5**	0.1	**7.7**
1987–88	Milwaukee	5	0	7.8	.333	.000	.000	0.6	0.6	0.4	0.2	2.4
1987–88	San Antonio	16	0	11.7	.433	.067	.700	2.4	**1.1**	0.0	0.2	5.8
1988–89	Chicago	49	3	11.1	.426	.267	.731	2.3	0.6	0.2	0.1	3.8
1989–90	Chicago	53	0	8.1	.367	**.280**	**.875**	1.5	0.3	0.2	0.2	2.5
Career		415	32	12.2	.451	.170	.737	2.4	0.7	0.3	0.2	5.3

=== Playoffs ===
Year	Team	GP	GS	MPG	FG%	3P%	FT%	RPG	APG	SPG	BPG	PPG
1981–82	Washington	6	-	8.7	.412	.000	**1.000**	0.8	0.5	0.2	**0.2**	2.7
1983–84	Washington	3	-	5.7	**.583**	.000	.000	1.0	0.0	0.0	0.0	4.7
1984–85	Milwaukee	5	0	10.2	.400	.000	.750	2.0	**0.8**	0.0	0.0	3.8
1985–86	Milwaukee	12	0	**12.1**	.362	.000	.900	2.1	0.5	**0.3**	0.0	**5.0**
1988–89	Chicago	**17**	0	11.2	.404	**.167**	.778	**2.5**	0.3	0.2	0.1	2.7
1989–90	Chicago	6	0	3.3	.286	.000	.000	0.5	0.2	0.0	0.0	0.7
Career		49	0	9.7	.398	.091	.857	1.8	0.4	0.2	0.0	3.2
