= 1981–82 Los Angeles Lakers season =

Pro basketball team season (won NBA championship)

- NBA champions
- Conference champions
- Division champions
- Head coach: Paul Westhead (fired); Pat Riley
- General manager: Bill Sharman
- Owner: Jerry Buss
- Arena: The Forum

Results
- Record: 57–25 (.695)
- Place: Division: 1st (Pacific); Conference: 1st (Western)
- Playoff finish: NBA champions (Defeated 76ers 4–2)
- Stats at Basketball Reference

Local media
- Television: KHJ
- Radio: AM 570 KLAC

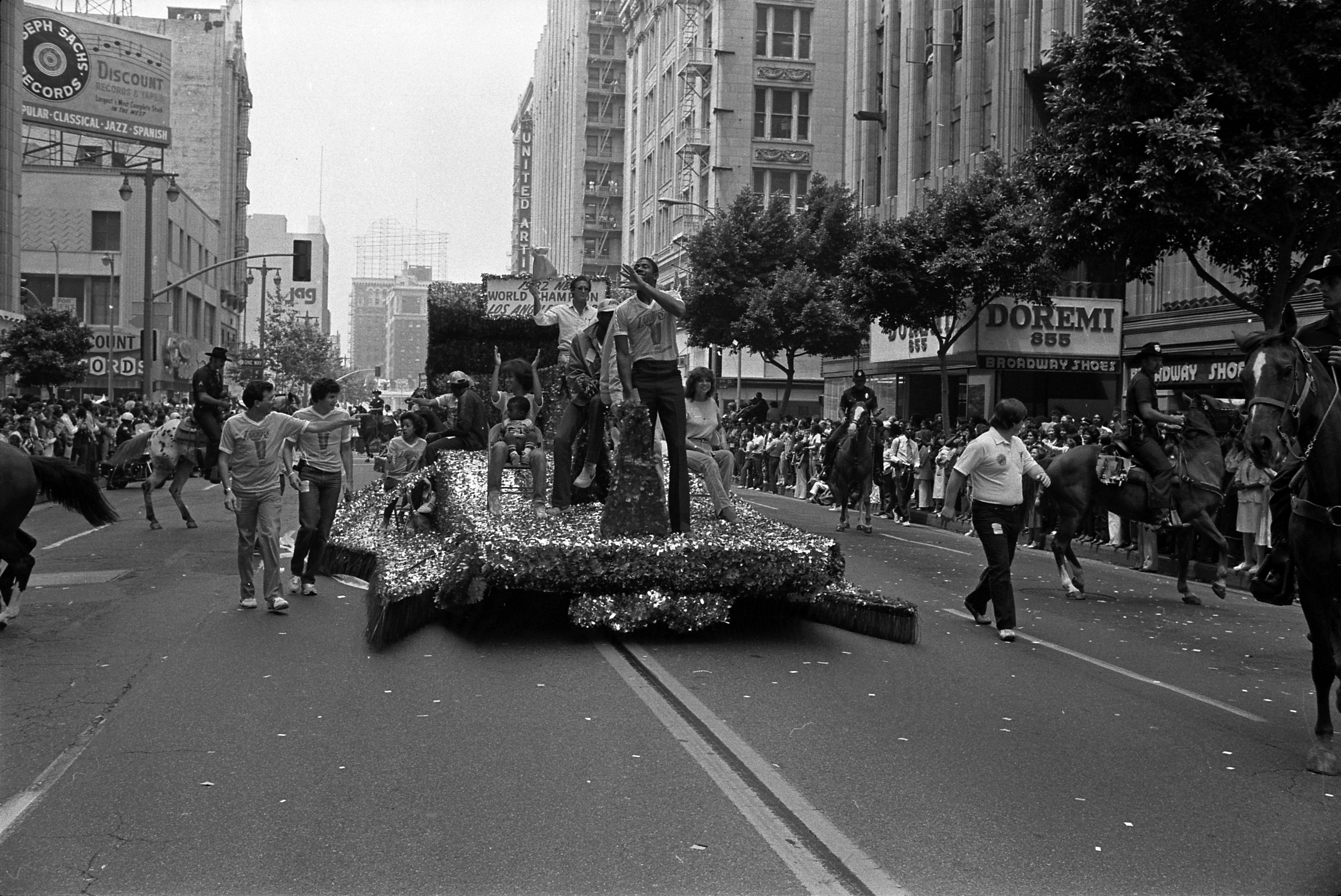
Championship parade, June 1982

The 1981–82 Los Angeles Lakers season saw the Lakers win the NBA Finals for their third NBA championship in Los Angeles, and their eighth overall in franchise history.

== Draft picks ==
Round	Pick	Player	Position	Nationality	College
8	179	Jay Triano		Canada	Simon Fraser University

== Roster ==
1981–82 Los Angeles Lakers roster
Players

Pos.	No.	Player	Height	Weight	DOB	From
C	33	Kareem Abdul-Jabbar	7 ft 2 in (2.18 m)	225 lb (102 kg)	1947-04-16	UCLA
PF	8	Jim Brewer	6 ft 9 in (2.06 m)	210 lb (95 kg)	1951-12-03	Minnesota
SG	21	Michael Cooper	6 ft 5 in (1.96 m)	170 lb (77 kg)	1956-04-15	New Mexico
G	34	Clay Johnson	6 ft 4 in (1.93 m)	175 lb (79 kg)	1956-07-18	Missouri
SG	32	Magic Johnson	6 ft 9 in (2.06 m)	215 lb (98 kg)	1959-08-14	Michigan State
PG	5	Eddie Jordan	6 ft 1 in (1.85 m)	170 lb (77 kg)	1955-01-29	Rutgers
F	25	Mitch Kupchak	6 ft 9 in (2.06 m)	230 lb (104 kg)	1954–05–24	North Carolina
PF	54	Mark Landsberger	6 ft 8 in (2.03 m)	215 lb (98 kg)	1955-05-21	Arizona State
C	11	Bob McAdoo	6 ft 9 in (2.06 m)	210 lb (95 kg)	1951-09-25	North Carolina
F	40	Mike McGee	6 ft 5 in (1.96 m)	190 lb (86 kg)	1959-07-29	Michigan
G	30	Kevin McKenna	6 ft 5 in (1.96 m)	195 lb (88 kg)	1959–01–08	Creighton
PG	10	Norm Nixon	6 ft 2 in (1.88 m)	170 lb (77 kg)	1955-10-11	Duquesne
F	31	Kurt Rambis	6 ft 8 in (2.03 m)	213 lb (97 kg)	1958-02-25	Santa Clara
SF	52	Jamaal Wilkes	6 ft 6 in (1.98 m)	190 lb (86 kg)	1953-05-02	UCLA

Coaches
Head coach
- Paul Westhead (first 11 games; fired Nov. 19)
- Pat Riley
Assistant(s)
- Mike Thibault

Legend
- (DP) Unsigned draft pick
- (FA) Free agent
- (S) Suspended
- Injured

Roster

== Regular season ==
Soon before the start of training camp, Jamaal Wilkes' eight-day-old daughter died, his second child to die as a baby. He started the season slowly, culminating with a 1-for-10 shooting performance in a 128–102 loss to San Antonio on November 10, 1981. He seriously considered quitting basketball.

On November 18, 1981, at halftime while on the road at Utah, Magic Johnson and coach Paul Westhead had a verbal altercation in the locker room. It was stated by teammate Kareem Abdul-Jabbar that Johnson had offered input on the game, which resulted in Westhead twice telling him to "Shut up." Johnson then told reporters after this game that he would like to be traded anywhere, resulting in a barrage of media coverage. One day after these events, Lakers owner Jerry Buss held a press conference at The Forum, where he announced the firing of Westhead, with his replacement being Pat Riley as "coach" and general manager Jerry West as "offensive coach". West came to the podium and clarified to media that Riley was indeed the head coach and that West himself would simply provide him support on the bench, which lasted for a period of 12 games. Although Johnson denied responsibility for Westhead's firing, he was booed across the league, even by Lakers' fans. However, Buss was also unhappy with the Lakers offense and had intended on firing Westhead days before the Westhead–Johnson altercation, but assistant GM West and GM Bill Sharman had convinced Buss to delay his decision.

Wilkes recovered to average 21.1 points and shoot 52.5% as Los Angeles advanced to the NBA Finals, where they faced Philadelphia. Wilkes scored a team-high 27 points in game 6 as the Lakers won the series 4–2. Johnson had a triple-double with 13 points, 13 rebounds, 13 assists and four steals and was named the NBA Finals Most Valuable Player.

=== Season standings ===
Pacific Division	W	L	PCT	GB	Home	Road	Div
y-Los Angeles Lakers	57	25	.695	–	30–11	27–14	21–9
x-Seattle SuperSonics	52	30	.634	5.0	31–10	21–20	18–12
x-Phoenix Suns	46	36	.561	11.0	31–10	15–26	14–16
Golden State Warriors	45	37	.549	12.0	28–13	17–24	15–15
Portland Trail Blazers	42	40	.512	15.0	27–14	15–26	15–15
San Diego Clippers	17	65	.207	40.0	11–30	6–35	7–23

#	Western Conference				
#	Team	W	L	PCT	GB
1	c-Los Angeles Lakers	57	25	.695	–
2	y-San Antonio Spurs	48	34	.585	9
3	x-Seattle SuperSonics	52	30	.634	5
4	x-Denver Nuggets	46	36	.561	11
5	x-Phoenix Suns	46	36	.561	11
6	x-Houston Rockets	46	36	.561	11
7	Golden State Warriors	45	37	.549	12
8	Portland Trail Blazers	42	40	.512	15
9	Kansas City Kings	30	52	.366	27
10	Dallas Mavericks	28	54	.341	29
11	Utah Jazz	25	57	.305	32
12	San Diego Clippers	17	65	.207	40

c - clinched homecourt advantage
y - clinched division title
x - clinched playoff spot

== Game log ==
=== Regular season ===
1981–82 game log
Total: 57-25 (Home: 30-11; Road: 27-14)
October: 0–1 (home: 0–1; road: 0–0)

Game	Date	Team	Score	High points	High rebounds	High assists	Location Attendance	Record
1	October 30	Houston	L 112-113 (2OT)	Kareem Abdul-Jabbar (33)	Magic Johnson (14)	Magic Johnson (12)	The Forum; 15,884	0–1

November: 12–4 (home: 5–2; road: 7–2)

Game	Date	Team	Score	High points	High rebounds	High assists	Location Attendance	Record
2	November 3	@ Portland	L 100-102	Kareem Abdul-Jabbar (33)	Magic Johnson (12)	Magic Johnson (10)	Memorial Coliseum; 12,666	0–2
3	November 4	@ Seattle	W 106-103	Norm Nixon (22)	Magic Johnson (12)	Norm Nixon (7)	Kingdome; 14,536	1–2
4	November 6	Phoenix	L 99-101	Kareem Abdul-Jabbar (27)	Kareem Abdul-Jabbar (14)	Magic Johnson (16)	The Forum; 13,665	1–3
5	November 8	Dallas	W 121-111	Magic Johnson (24)	Abdul-Jabbar & Johnson (10)	Magic Johnson (15)	The Forum; 9,870	2–3
6	November 10	@ San Antonio	L 102-128	Kareem Abdul-Jabbar (29)	Kareem Abdul-Jabbar (13)	Magic Johnson (7)	HemisFair Arena; 11,365	2–4
7	November 11	@ Houston	W 95-93	Kareem Abdul-Jabbar (21)	Abdul-Jabbar & Johnson (9)	Norm Nixon (11)	The Summit; 15,535	3–4
8	November 13	Portland	W 119-115	Kareem Abdul-Jabbar (29)	Mitch Kupchak (12)	Magic Johnson (15)	The Forum; 17,505	4-4
9	November 14	@ Phoenix	W 98-97	Norm Nixon (24)	Kareem Abdul-Jabbar (17)	Magic Johnson (9)	Arizona Veterans Memorial Coliseum; 14,068	5–4
10	November 15	Indiana	W 124-123 (2OT)	Kareem Abdul-Jabbar (23)	Kareem Abdul-Jabbar (20)	Norm Nixon (10)	The Forum; 14,140	6–4
11	November 18	@ Utah	W 113-110	Kareem Abdul-Jabbar (27)	Cooper & Johnson (8)	Magic Johnson (9)	Salt Palace; 10,802	7–4
12	November 20	San Antonio	W 136-116	Kareem Abdul-Jabbar (30)	Mitch Kupchak (17)	Magic Johnson (16)	The Forum; 17,505	8–4
13	November 21	@ San Diego	W 119-117	Kareem Abdul-Jabbar (33)	Kareem Abdul-Jabbar (12)	Magic Johnson (10)	San Diego Sports Arena; 11,057	9–4
14	November 24	@ Dallas	W 125-110	Kareem Abdul-Jabbar (25)	Mark Landsberger (10)	Johnson & Nixon (9)	Reunion Arena; 14,266	10–4
15	November 25	@ San Antonio	W 117-96	Jamaal Wilkes (26)	Abdul-Jabbar & Johnson (13)	Magic Johnson (9)	HemisFair Arena; 13,653	11–4
16	November 27	San Diego	L 129-138	Kareem Abdul-Jabbar (30)	Kareem Abdul-Jabbar (7)	Norm Nixon (16)	The Forum; 14,586	11–5
17	November 29	Houston	W 122-104	Abdul-Jabbar & Nixon (23)	Magic Johnson (11)	Johnson & Nixon (11)	The Forum; 13,247	12–5

December: 12–2 (home: 8–0; road: 4–2)

Game	Date	Team	Score	High points	High rebounds	High assists	Location Attendance	Record
18	December 1	Utah	W 117-86	Magic Johnson (19)	Kareem Abdul-Jabbar (11)	Magic Johnson (8)	The Forum; 11,384	13–5
19	December 2	@ Seattle	L 96-104	Kareem Abdul-Jabbar (30)	Kareem Abdul-Jabbar (10)	Norm Nixon (8)	Kingdome; 20,021	13–6
20	December 4	@ Denver	W 126-117	Norm Nixon (25)	Mitch Kupchak (13)	Magic Johnson (11)	McNichols Sports Arena; 14,562	14–6
21	December 6	Kansas City	W 119-106	Johnson & Wilkes (22)	Mitch Kupchak (12)	Norm Nixon (10)	The Forum; 15,321	15–6
22	December 8	Washington	W 102-98	Norm Nixon (24)	Kareem Abdul-Jabbar (13)	Magic Johnson (10)	The Forum; 10,459	16–6
23	December 11	Portland	W 124-116	Kareem Abdul-Jabbar (29)	Magic Johnson (12)	Johnson & Nixon (10)	The Forum; 15,658	17–6
24	December 13	Golden State	W 122-118	Kareem Abdul-Jabbar (33)	Magic Johnson (13)	Abdul-Jabbar & Nixon (8)	The Forum; 13,103	18–6
25	December 17	@ Golden State	L 115-120	Kareem Abdul-Jabbar (28)	Kareem Abdul-Jabbar (13)	Norm Nixon (7)	Oakland-Alameda County Coliseum Arena; 13,239	18–7
26	December 19	@ San Diego	W 106-100	Jamaal Wilkes (33)	Magic Johnson (13)	Magic Johnson (7)	San Diego Sports Arena; 6,563	19–7
27	December 20	Atlanta	W 112-94	Jamaal Wilkes (36)	Jim Brewer (15)	Norm Nixon (12)	The Forum; 12,460	20–7
28	December 22	@ Portland	W 124-110	Norm Nixon (27)	Magic Johnson (10)	3 players tied (6)	Memorial Coliseum; 12,666	21–7
29	December 25	@ Phoenix	W 104-101	Michael Cooper (30)	Jim Brewer (15)	Magic Johnson (8)	Arizona Veterans Memorial Coliseum; 14,056	22–7
30	December 27	San Diego	W 139-117	Mike McGee (27)	Mark Landsberger (12)	Magic Johnson (11)	The Forum; 14,951	23–7
31	December 29	Utah	W 121-114	Jamaal Wilkes (34)	Brewer & Wilkes (9)	Magic Johnson (12)	The Forum; 14,392	24–7

January: 7–5 (home: 3–2; road: 4–3)

Game	Date	Team	Score	High points	High rebounds	High assists	Location Attendance	Record
32	January 3	Seattle	L 90-110	Kareem Abdul-Jabbar (26)	Kareem Abdul-Jabbar (16)	Magic Johnson (14)	The Forum; 17,505	24–8
33	January 8	@ Chicago	L 113-119	Magic Johnson (32)	Mark Landsberger (8)	Kareem Abdul-Jabbar (7)	Chicago Stadium; 18,947	24–9
34	January 9	@ Detroit	W 130-127	Magic Johnson (40)	Kareem Abdul-Jabbar (13)	Norm Nixon (10)	Pontiac Silverdome; 21,045	25–9
35	January 10	@ Milwaukee	L 107-118	Magic Johnson (28)	Jamaal Wilkes (9)	Norm Nixon (9)	MECCA Arena; 11,052	25–10
36	January 12	@ Cleveland	W 114-100	Jamaal Wilkes (33)	Magic Johnson (14)	Norm Nixon (11)	Richfield Coliseum; 8,259	26–10
37	January 15	@ Indiana	W 97-92	Kareem Abdul-Jabbar (30)	Magic Johnson (15)	Eddie Jordan (6)	Market Square Arena; 11,029	27–10
38	January 17	@ Kansas City	W 109-97	Magic Johnson (29)	Kareem Abdul-Jabbar (11)	Magic Johnson (9)	Kemper Arena; 9,879	28–10
39	January 19	@ Denver	L 139-140	3 players tied (22)	Magic Johnson (16)	Magic Johnson (14)	McNichols Sports Arena; 15,272	28–11
40	January 20	New Jersey	W 132-113	Jamaal Wilkes (30)	Kurt Rambis (9)	Magic Johnson (12)	The Forum; 11,323	29–11
41	January 22	Detroit	W 123-111	Magic Johnson (26)	Johnson & Rambis (16)	Magic Johnson (12)	The Forum; 14,955	30–11
42	January 26	Milwaukee	L 94-96	Jamaal Wilkes (18)	Kareem Abdul-Jabbar (15)	Norm Nixon (13)	The Forum; 16,042	30–12
43	January 28	Phoenix	W 97-87	Kareem Abdul-Jabbar (31)	Magic Johnson (6)	Magic Johnson (11)	The Forum; 14,623	31–12
All-Star Break

February: 10–5 (home: 5–3; road: 5–2)

Game	Date	Team	Score	High points	High rebounds	High assists	Location Attendance	Record
44	February 2	@ Golden State	L 117-119	Kareem Abdul-Jabbar (29)	Magic Johnson (14)	Magic Johnson (10)	Oakland-Alameda County Coliseum Arena; 13,329	31–13
45	February 3	New York	L 94-98	Jamaal Wilkes (26)	Jamaal Wilkes (10)	Norm Nixon (10)	The Forum; 12,913	31–14
46	February 5	@ Washington	W 90-87	Magic Johnson (22)	Kurt Rambis (10)	Norm Nixon (7)	Capital Centre; 19,035	32–14
47	February 7	@ Boston	W 119-113	Kareem Abdul-Jabbar (35)	Jamaal Wilkes (8)	Norm Nixon (13)	Boston Garden; 15,320	33–14
48	February 9	@ Atlanta	W 130-117	Bob McAdoo (22)	Abdul-Jabbar & Johnson (8)	Norm Nixon (10)	Omni Coliseum; 12,913	34–14
49	February 10	@ Kansas City	L 102-125	Jamaal Wilkes (24)	Jamaal Wilkes (7)	Jordan & Nixon (4)	Kemper Arena; 9,580	34–15
50	February 12	San Antonio	L 94-100	Jamaal Wilkes (23)	Magic Johnson (15)	Johnson & Nixon (8)	The Forum; 17,505	34–16
51	February 14	Boston	L 103-108	Jamaal Wilkes (25)	Magic Johnson (10)	Magic Johnson (8)	The Forum; 17,505	34–17
52	February 16	Seattle	W 108-101	Kareem Abdul-Jabbar (26)	Jim Brewer (12)	Magic Johnson (18)	The Forum; 15,047	35–17
53	February 19	Golden State	W 126-106	Magic Johnson (26)	Magic Johnson (14)	Norm Nixon (10)	The Forum; 17,505	36–17
54	February 21	@ Denver	W 132-131	Norm Nixon (26)	Mark Landsberger (9)	Magic Johnson (8)	McNichols Sports Arena; 17,337	37–17
55	February 23	Denver	W 145-129	Jamaal Wilkes (31)	Abdul-Jabbar & Rambis (7)	Norm Nixon (16)	The Forum; 14,072	38–17
56	February 25	@ Seattle	W 104-98	Kareem Abdul-Jabbar (31)	Magic Johnson (12)	Norm Nixon (12)	Kingdome; 26,209	39–17
57	February 26	Philadelphia	W 116-114 (2OT)	Kareem Abdul-Jabbar (41)	Kareem Abdul-Jabbar (19)	Magic Johnson (10)	The Forum; 17,505	40–17
58	February 28	Cleveland	W 102-101	Kareem Abdul-Jabbar (32)	Kurt Rambis (17)	Norm Nixon (10)	The Forum; 14,882	41–17

March: 8–6 (home: 4–2; road: 4–4)

Game	Date	Team	Score	High points	High rebounds	High assists	Location Attendance	Record
59	March 3	@ New Jersey	L 103-111	Kareem Abdul-Jabbar (30)	Magic Johnson (8)	Norm Nixon (8)	Brendan Byrne Arena; 15,623	41–18
60	March 4	@ New York	L 119-129 (OT)	Kareem Abdul-Jabbar (39)	Kareem Abdul-Jabbar (14)	Magic Johnson (9)	Madison Square Garden; 14,937	41–19
61	March 7	@ Philadelphia	L 113-119	Abdul-Jabbar & Nixon (26)	Magic Johnson (11)	Magic Johnson (8)	The Spectrum; 18,364	41–20
62	March 9	Kansas City	W 105-99	Magic Johnson (27)	Kurt Rambis (12)	Norm Nixon (5)	The Forum; 11,614	42–20
63	March 12	Chicago	L 105-111	Magic Johnson (30)	Kareem Abdul-Jabbar (10)	Magic Johnson (8)	The Forum; 17,505	42–21
64	March 14	Dallas	W 138-116	Kareem Abdul-Jabbar (28)	Magic Johnson (11)	Magic Johnson (13)	The Forum; 13,809	43–21
65	March 16	@ Portland	W 120-108	Jamaal Wilkes (27)	Mark Landsberger (14)	Johnson & Nixon (9)	Memorial Coliseum; 12,666	44–21
6	March 17	@ Utah	W 120-112	Kareem Abdul-Jabbar (28)	Magic Johnson (10)	Magic Johnson (9)	Salt Palace; 12,076	45–21
67	March 19	@ Dallas	W 112-106	Kareem Abdul-Jabbar (23)	Kareem Abdul-Jabbar (11)	Magic Johnson (10)	Reunion Arena; 17,134	46–21
68	March 21	Houston	W 107-102	Magic Johnson (25)	Magic Johnson (16)	Magic Johnson (7)	The Forum; 17,505	47–21
69	March 23	Dallas	L 116-118	Kareem Abdul-Jabbar (32)	Magic Johnson (15)	Magic Johnson (14)	The Forum; 13,516	47–22
70	March 26	@ San Antonio	L 105-110	Kareem Abdul-Jabbar (28)	Kareem Abdul-Jabbar (10)	Magic Johnson (10)	HemisFair Arena; 14,850	47–23
71	March 28	@ Kansas City	W 116-111	Bob McAdoo (30)	Bob McAdoo (10)	Magic Johnson (8)	Kemper Arena; 9,521	48–23
72	March 30	San Diego	W 143-120	Magic Johnson (29)	Bob McAdoo (9)	Norm Nixon (13)	The Forum; 12,109	49–23

April: 8–2 (home: 5–1; road: 3–1)

Game	Date	Team	Score	High points	High rebounds	High assists	Location Attendance	Record
73	April 1	@ San Diego	W 117-100	Jamaal Wilkes (25)	Kurt Rambis (9)	Magic Johnson (17)	San Diego Sports Arena; 7,064	50–23
74	April 2	Phoenix	L 99-109	Jamaal Wilkes (23)	Kareem Abdul-Jabbar (9)	Johnson & Nixon (14)	The Forum; 17,505	50–24
75	April 4	Portland	W 129-111	Jamaal Wilkes (32)	Kurt Rambis (9)	Norm Nixon (13)	The Forum; 13,230	51–24
76	April 6	@ Houston	W 108-97	Magic Johnson (23)	Magic Johnson (11)	Magic Johnson (10)	The Summit; 15,676	52–24
77	April 9	Denver	W 153-128	Jamaal Wilkes (25)	Mark Landsberger (14)	Magic Johnson (16)	The Forum; 16,433	53–24
78	April 11	Seattle	W 107-104	Kareem Abdul-Jabbar (33)	Magic Johnson (12)	Johnson & Nixon (8)	The Forum; 17,505	54–24
79	April 13	@ Golden State	L 101-106	Kareem Abdul-Jabbar (27)	Kareem Abdul-Jabbar (10)	Johnson & Nixon (9)	Oakland-Alameda County Coliseum Arena; 13,239	54–25
80	April 14	Utah	W 128-115	Kareem Abdul-Jabbar (22)	Magic Johnson (11)	Magic Johnson (10)	The Forum; 11,488	55–25
81	April 16	Golden State	W 125-109	Kareem Abdul-Jabbar (26)	Kurt Rambis (12)	Magic Johnson (13)	The Forum; 17,505	56–25
82	April 18	@ Phoenix	W 120-115	Kareem Abdul-Jabbar (34)	Magic Johnson (15)	Magic Johnson (12)	Arizona Veterans Memorial Coliseum; 14,660	57–25

1981–82 schedule

=== Playoffs ===
1982 playoff game log
Total: 12–2 (Home: 7–0; Road: 5–2)
Conference Semi-finals: 4–0 (home: 2–0; road: 2–0)

Game	Date	Team	Score	High points	High rebounds	High assists	Location Attendance	Series
1	April 27	Phoenix	W 115–96	Jamaal Wilkes (28)	Bob McAdoo (12)	Magic Johnson (10)	The Forum; 13,623	1–0
2	April 28	Phoenix	W 117–98	Kareem Abdul-Jabbar (24)	Magic Johnson (12)	Magic Johnson (12)	The Forum; 15,558	2–0
3	April 30	@ Phoenix	W 114–106	Jamaal Wilkes (26)	Magic Johnson (14)	Magic Johnson (9)	Arizona Veterans Memorial Coliseum; 14,660	3–0
4	May 2	@ Phoenix	W 112–107	Jamaal Wilkes (24)	Kareem Abdul-Jabbar (13)	Magic Johnson (12)	Arizona Veterans Memorial Coliseum; 11,932	4–0

Western Conference Finals: 4–0 (home: 2–0; road: 2–0)

Game	Date	Team	Score	High points	High rebounds	High assists	Location Attendance	Series
1	May 9	San Antonio	W 128–117	Kareem Abdul-Jabbar (32)	Magic Johnson (16)	Magic Johnson (14)	The Forum; 15,700	1–0
2	May 11	San Antonio	W 110–101	Nixon & Wilkes (22)	Kurt Rambis (15)	Johnson & Nixon (9)	The Forum; 17,505	2–0
3	May 14	@ San Antonio	W 118–108	Kareem Abdul-Jabbar (26)	Abdul-Jabbar & Johnson (10)	Johnson & Nixon (10)	HemisFair Arena; 15,800	3–0
4	May 15	@ San Antonio	W 128–123	Norm Nixon (30)	Abdul-Jabbar & Johnson (9)	Norm Nixon (10)	HemisFair Arena; 15,800	4–0

NBA Finals: 4–2 (home: 3–0; road: 1–2)

Game	Date	Team	Score	High points	High rebounds	High assists	Location Attendance	Series
1	May 27	@ Philadelphia	W 124–117	Nixon & Wilkes (24)	Magic Johnson (14)	Norm Nixon (10)	The Spectrum; 18,364	1–0
2	May 30	@ Philadelphia	L 94–110	Kareem Abdul-Jabbar (23)	Magic Johnson (11)	Norm Nixon (10)	The Spectrum; 18,364	1–1
3	June 1	Philadelphia	W 129–108	Norm Nixon (29)	Magic Johnson (9)	Magic Johnson (8)	The Forum; 17,505	2–1
4	June 3	Philadelphia	W 111–101	Johnson & Wilkes (24)	Abdul-Jabbar & Rambis (11)	Norm Nixon (14)	The Forum; 17,505	3–1
5	June 6	@ Philadelphia	L 102–135	Bob McAdoo (23)	Magic Johnson (10)	Norm Nixon (13)	The Spectrum; 18,364	3–2
6	June 8	Philadelphia	W 114–104	Jamaal Wilkes (27)	Magic Johnson (13)	Magic Johnson (13)	The Forum; 17,505	4–2

1982 schedule

== Player statistics ==
Legend
GP	Games played	GS	Games started	MPG	Minutes per game
FG%	Field-goal percentage	3P%	3-point field-goal percentage	FT%	Free-throw percentage
RPG	Rebounds per game	APG	Assists per game	SPG	Steals per game
BPG	Blocks per game	PPG	Points per game

=== Season ===
Player	GP	GS	MPG	FG%	3FG%	FT%	RPG	APG	SPG	BPG	PPG

=== Playoffs ===
Player	GP	GS	MPG	FG%	3FG%	FT%	RPG	APG	SPG	BPG	PPG

== Awards and records ==
=== Awards ===
- Magic Johnson, NBA Finals Most Valuable Player Award
- Magic Johnson, All-NBA Second Team
- Michael Cooper, NBA All-Defensive First Team

== Transactions ==
=== Free agents ===
==== Additions ====
Player	Signed	Former team

==== Subtractions ====
Player	Left	New team
