= 1981–82 Milwaukee Bucks season =

NBA professional basketball team season

- Division champions
- Head coach: Don Nelson
- General manager: Don Nelson
- Owner: Jim Fitzgerald
- Arena: MECCA Arena

Results
- Record: 55–27 (.671)
- Place: Division: 1st (Central); Conference: 2nd (Eastern)
- Playoff finish: Conference semifinals (lost to 76ers 2–4)
- Stats at Basketball Reference

The 1981–82 Milwaukee Bucks season was the 14th season for the Bucks.

== Draft picks ==
Round	Pick	Player	Position	Nationality	School/Club team
1	21	Alton Lister	PF/C	United States	Arizona State
3	67	Mark Smith		United States	Illinois
4	90	Kris Anderson		United States	Florida State
5	113	Kelvin Troy		United States	Rutgers
6	136	Jo Jo Hunter		United States	Colorado
7	159	Lewis Latimore		United States	Virginia
8	181	Mike Brkovich		Canada	Michigan State
9	201	Chip Rucker		United States	Northeastern
10	221	Artie Green		United States	Marquette

== Roster ==
1981–82 Milwaukee Bucks roster
Players

Pos.	No.	Player	Height	Weight	DOB	From
SF	2	Junior Bridgeman (injured)	6 ft 5 in (1.96 m)	210 lb (95 kg)	1953–09–17	Louisville
PG	21	Quinn Buckner (injured)	6 ft 3 in (1.91 m)	190 lb (86 kg)	1954–08–20	Indiana
PF	42	Harvey Catchings	6 ft 9 in (2.06 m)	218 lb (99 kg)	1951–09–02	Hardin–Simmons
C	54	Geoff Crompton	6 ft 11 in (2.11 m)	280 lb (127 kg)	1955–07–04	North Carolina
G	15	Charlie Criss	5 ft 8 in (1.73 m)	165 lb (75 kg)	1948–11–06	New Mexico State
PF	6	Pat Cummings	6 ft 9 in (2.06 m)	230 lb (104 kg)	1956–07–11	Cincinnati
SF	8	Marques Johnson	6 ft 7 in (2.01 m)	218 lb (99 kg)	1956–02–08	UCLA
PF	43	Mickey Johnson	6 ft 10 in (2.08 m)	190 lb (86 kg)	1952–08–31	Aurora
C	16	Bob Lanier	6 ft 11 in (2.11 m)	250 lb (113 kg)	1948–09–10	St. Bonaventure
C	53	Alton Lister	7 ft 0 in (2.13 m)	240 lb (109 kg)	1958–10–01	Arizona State
F	7	Scott May	6 ft 7 in (2.01 m)	215 lb (98 kg)	1954–03–19	Indiana
PG	4	Sidney Moncrief	6 ft 3 in (1.91 m)	180 lb (82 kg)	1957–09–21	Arkansas
SG	32	Brian Winters	6 ft 4 in (1.93 m)	185 lb (84 kg)	1952–03–01	South Carolina

Coaches
Head coach
- Don Nelson
Assistant(s)
- John Killilea
- Garry St. Jean
- Dave Wohl

Legend
- (DP) Unsigned draft pick
- (FA) Free agent
- (S) Suspended
- Injured

== Regular season ==
=== Season standings ===
Central Division	W	L	PCT	GB	Home	Road	Div
y-Milwaukee Bucks	55	27	.671	–	31–10	24–17	24–6
x-Atlanta Hawks	42	40	.512	13.0	24–17	18–23	15–14
Detroit Pistons	39	43	.476	16.0	23–18	16–25	19–11
Indiana Pacers	35	47	.427	20.0	25–16	10–31	14–16
Chicago Bulls	34	48	.415	21.0	22–19	12–29	12–17
Cleveland Cavaliers	15	67	.183	40.0	9–32	6–35	5–25

#	Eastern Conference				
#	Team	W	L	PCT	GB
1	z-Boston Celtics	63	19	.768	–
2	y-Milwaukee Bucks	55	27	.671	8
3	x-Philadelphia 76ers	58	24	.707	5
4	x-New Jersey Nets	44	38	.537	19
5	x-Washington Bullets	43	39	.524	20
6	x-Atlanta Hawks	42	40	.512	21
7	Detroit Pistons	39	43	.476	24
8	Indiana Pacers	35	47	.427	28
9	Chicago Bulls	34	48	.415	29
10	New York Knicks	33	49	.402	30
11	Cleveland Cavaliers	15	67	.183	48

z = clinched division title
y = clinched division title
x = clinched playoff spot

== Game log ==
=== Regular season ===
1981–82 game log
Total: 55–27 (home: 31–10; road: 24–17)
October: 1–1 (home: 1–0; road: 0–1)

Game	Date	Team	Score	High points	High rebounds	High assists	Location Attendance	Record
1	October 30, 1981	@ Detroit	L 113–118	Sidney Moncrief (22)	Mickey Johnson (10)	Quinn Buckner (8)	Pontiac Silverdome	0–1
2	October 31	Boston	W 119–103	Sidney Moncrief (29)	Harvey Catchings, Mickey Johnson (10)		MECCA Arena	1–1

November: 8–5 (home: 6–1; road: 2–4)

Game	Date	Team	Score	High points	High rebounds	High assists	Location Attendance	Record
3	November 5, 1981	Washington	W 98–90	Brian Winters (25)	Mickey Johnson (11)		MECCA Arena	2–1
4	November 7, 1981	San Diego	W 105–102	Brian Winters (22)			MECCA Arena	3–1
5	November 10, 1981	@ Atlanta	L 83—94	Mickey Johnson (20)			The Omni	3–2
6	November 11, 1981	@ New Jersey	W 100—88	Bob Lanier (20)			Brendan Byrne Arena	4–2
7	November 13, 1981	New York	W 105–102	Quinn Buckner (21)			MECCA Arena	5–2
8	November 15, 1981	Cleveland	W 98–96	Sidney Moncrief (28)			MECCA Arena	6–2
9	November 17, 1981	@ Washington	W 99—95				Capital Centre	7–2
10	November 18	@ Philadelphia	L 100–102				The Spectrum	7–3
11	November 20	@ Boston	L 89–112				Boston Garden	7–4
12	November 21, 1981	@ New York	L 112—118				Madison Square Garden	7–5
13	November 24, 1981	Detroit	W 103–95				MECCA Arena	8–5
14	November 27, 1981	Golden State	L 96–113				MECCA Arena	8–6
15	November 29	San Antonio	W 105–89				MECCA Arena	9–6

December: 10–2 (home: 5–2; road: 5–0)

Game	Date	Team	Score	High points	High rebounds	High assists	Location Attendance	Record
16	December 1, 1981	@ Cleveland	W 126—110	Sidney Moncrief (39)			Coliseum at Richfield	10–6
17	December 4, 1981	Atlanta	W 97–80				MECCA Arena	11–6
18	December 5, 1981	@ Detroit	W 111–108				Pontiac Silverdome	12–6
19	December 9, 1981	Houston	W 89–83				MECCA Arena	13–6
20	December 11, 1981	Indiana	W 103–100 OT				MECCA Arena	14–6
21	December 12, 1981	@ New York	W 104—86				Madison Square Garden	15–6
22	December 13	Philadelphia	W 127–108				MECCA Arena	16–6
23	December 15, 1981	@ Indiana	W 104–96				Market Square Arena	17–6
24	December 18, 1981	New Jersey	L 88–100				MECCA Arena	17–7
25	December 22, 1981	Kansas City	L 101–106				MECCA Arena	17–8
26	December 26, 1981	@ Cleveland	W 109—102				Coliseum at Richfield	18–8
27	December 27, 1981	Chicago	W 108–96				MECCA Arena	19–8

January: 2–1 (home: 0–0; road: 2–1)

Game	Date	Team	Score	High points	High rebounds	High assists	Location Attendance	Record
35	January 10	Los Angeles	W 118–107				MECCA Arena	24–11
36	January 13	@ Philadelphia	W 111–107				The Spectrum	25–11
37	January 15	Boston	W 122–118				MECCA Arena	26–11
39	January 20, 1982	@ Dallas	L 104–109				Reunion Arena	26–13
42	January 26	@ Los Angeles	W 96–94	Marques Johnson (20)			The Forum	28–14
43	January 28, 1982	@ Utah	W 119–101				Salt Palace	29–14

February: 3–0 (home: 3–0; road: 0–0)

Game	Date	Team	Score	High points	High rebounds	High assists	Location Attendance	Record
44	February 3, 1982	Chicago	W 113–98	Brian Winters (25)			MECCA Arena	30–14
45	February 5, 1982	Dallas	W 117–92	Sidney Moncrief, Brian Winters (19)			MECCA Arena	31–14
46	February 7, 1982	Phoenix	W 107–92	Scott May, Brian Winters (32)			MECCA Arena	32–14
56	February 28	@ Boston	L 102–106				Boston Garden	40–16

March: 1–2 (home: 1–1; road: 0–1)

Game	Date	Team	Score	High points	High rebounds	High assists	Location Attendance	Record
59	March 6	@ San Antonio	L 166–171 (3OT)				HemisFair Arena	42–17
63	March 12, 1982	Seattle	L 110–112				MECCA Arena	42–21
64	March 14, 1982	Utah	W 129–100				MECCA Arena	43–21
65	March 16	Philadelphia	W 106–91				MECCA Arena	44–21
72	March 30	Philadelphia	W 116–114 (OT)				MECCA Arena	49–23

April: 0–0 (home: 0–0; road: 0–0)

Game	Date	Team	Score	High points	High rebounds	High assists	Location Attendance	Record
76	April 6	Boston	W 122–116				MECCA Arena	53–23
80	April 14	@ Boston	L 91–100				Boston Garden	54–26
82	April 18	@ Philadelphia	L 86–110				The Spectrum	55–27

1981–82 schedule

== Playoffs ==
1982 playoff game log
Conference semifinals: 2–4 (home: 1–2; road: 1–2)

Game	Date	Team	Score	High points	High rebounds	High assists	Location Attendance	Series
1	April 25	@ Philadelphia	L 122–125	Mickey Johnson (28)	Marques Johnson (7)	Brian Winters (5)	The Spectrum; 10,086	0–1
2	April 28	@ Philadelphia	L 108–120	Brian Winters (21)	Bob Lanier (11)	Winters, May (5)	The Spectrum; 14,716	0–2
3	May 1	Philadelphia	W 92–91	Mickey Johnson (21)	Marques Johnson (11)	Marques Johnson (7)	MECCA Arena; 11,052	1–2
4	May 2	Philadelphia	L 93–100	Marques Johnson (23)	Mickey Johnson, Moncrief (7)	Mickey Johnson (7)	MECCA Arena; 11,052	1–3
5	May 5	@ Philadelphia	W 110–98	Bob Lanier (27)	Alton Lister (11)	Brian Winters (7)	The Spectrum; 16,668	2–3
6	May 7	Philadelphia	L 90–102	Bob Lanier (19)	Bob Lanier (10)	Brian Winters (6)	MECCA Arena; 11,052	2–4

1982 schedule

== Player statistics ==
Legend
GP	Games played	GS	Games started	MPG	Minutes per game
FG%	Field-goal percentage	3P%	3-point field-goal percentage	FT%	Free-throw percentage
RPG	Rebounds per game	APG	Assists per game	SPG	Steals per game
BPG	Blocks per game	PPG	Points per game

Player statistics source:

=== Season ===
Player	GP	GS	MPG	FG%	3FG%	FT%	RPG	APG	SPG	BPG	PPG
Sidney Moncrief	80	80	37.3	52.3	7.1	81.7	6.7	4.8	1.7	0.3	19.8
Marques Johnson	60	52	31.7	53.2	0.0	70.0	6.1	3.6	1.0	0.6	16.5
Brian Winters	61	13	30.0	50.1	38.7	78.8	2.8	4.1	0.9	0.1	15.9
Bob Lanier	74	72	26.8	55.8	0.0	75.2	5.2	3.0	1.0	0.8	13.5
Quinn Buckner	70	70	30.8	48.2	26.7	65.5	3.6	4.7	2.5	0.0	12.9
Mickey Johnson	76	71	25.4	49.1	14.3	80.1	6.0	2.8	0.9	0.6	12.9
Junior Bridgeman	41	4	22.5	48.3	44.4	86.4	3.0	2.7	0.7	0.1	12.5
Scott May	65	7	18.3	50.8	0.0	82.4	3.4	2.0	0.8	0.1	9.0
Robert Smith	17	1	18.6	47.3	20.0	83.3	0.8	2.6	0.6	0.1	6.8
Pat Cummings	78	7	14.5	50.9	0.0	73.6	3.1	1.3	0.3	0.1	6.5
Bob Dandridge	11	0	15.8	38.2	0.0	58.8	1.5	1.2	0.5	0.2	4.7
Alton Lister	80	23	14.8	51.9	0.0	52.0	4.8	1.1	0.2	1.5	4.5
Kevin Stacom	7	0	12.9	41.2	50.0	50.0	1.0	1.0	0.1	0.0	4.3
Mike Evans	14	0	14.0	47.1	0.0	66.7	0.9	1.6	0.6	0.0	4.0
Harvey Catchings	80	9	20.0	42.0	0.0	59.4	4.5	1.2	0.5	1.7	2.9
Geoff Crompton	35	1	5.8	34.4	0.0	40.0	1.2	0.4	0.2	0.3	0.8
Brad Holland	1	0	9.0	0.0	0.0	0.0	0.0	2.0	0.0	0.0	0.0

=== Playoffs ===
Player	GP	GS	MPG	FG%	3FG%	FT%	RPG	APG	SPG	BPG	PPG
Mickey Johnson	6		34.3	57.3	0.0	84.6	5.3	3.0	1.3	0.7	19.8
Marques Johnson	6		39.2	44.0	25.0	57.1	7.3	3.3	1.0	0.3	18.8
Brian Winters	6		38.7	49.4	50.0	83.3	2.5	4.7	1.3	0.2	16.8
Bob Lanier	6		35.3	51.3	0.0	56.0	7.5	3.7	1.3	0.8	16.0
Sidney Moncrief	6		42.0	41.9	0.0	78.9	5.0	4.0	1.5	0.3	15.3
Alton Lister	6		18.7	58.3	0.0	71.4	4.5	0.8	0.3	2.5	5.5
Robert Smith	6		11.3	38.5	28.6	87.5	1.2	2.0	0.2	0.0	4.8
Scott May	4		12.5	20.0	0.0	64.3	2.8	2.5	0.5	0.0	4.3
Brad Holland	1		3.0	100.0	0.0	0.0	0.0	1.0	0.0	0.0	2.0
Pat Cummings	6		7.3	36.4	0.0	50.0	1.8	0.3	0.0	0.3	1.5
Harvey Catchings	6		4.3	66.7	0.0	0.0	1.2	0.0	0.0	0.5	0.7

== Awards and records ==
- Sidney Moncrief, All-NBA Second Team
- Sidney Moncrief, NBA All-Defensive Second Team
- Quinn Buckner, NBA All-Defensive Second Team

== Transactions ==
=== Free agents ===
Player	Signed	Former team
Scott May	November 16, 1981	Chicago Bulls
