= 1981–82 NBA season =

36th NBA season

- League: National Basketball Association
- Sport: Basketball
- Duration: October 30, 1981 – April 18, 1982; April 20 – May 23, 1982 (Playoffs); May 27 – June 8, 1982 (Finals)
- Teams: 23
- TV partner(s): CBS, USA

Draft
- Top draft pick: Mark Aguirre
- Picked by: Dallas Mavericks

Regular season
- Top seed: Boston Celtics
- Season MVP: Moses Malone (Houston)
- Top scorer: George Gervin (San Antonio)

Playoffs
- Eastern champions: Philadelphia 76ers
- Eastern runners-up: Boston Celtics
- Western champions: Los Angeles Lakers
- Western runners-up: San Antonio Spurs

Finals
- Champions: Los Angeles Lakers
- Runners-up: Philadelphia 76ers
- Finals MVP: Magic Johnson (Los Angeles)

NBA seasons
- ← 1980–81 1982–83 →

The 1981–82 NBA season was the 36th season of the National Basketball Association. The season ended with the Los Angeles Lakers winning the NBA championship, beating the Philadelphia 76ers 4 games to 2 in the NBA Finals.

== Notable occurrences ==
- The regular-season ran until mid to late-April for the first time.
- The 1982 NBA All-Star Game was played at the new Brendan Byrne Arena (later the Meadowlands Arena) in East Rutherford, New Jersey, with the East defeating the West 120–118. Larry Bird of the Boston Celtics wins the game's MVP award. This season also marked the New Jersey Nets first season in the new arena.
- On March 6, 1982, San Antonio beat Milwaukee 171–166 in three overtime periods to set the record for most points by two teams in a game. The record was broken two seasons later.
- Magic Johnson secures his second NBA Finals MVP award several months before his 23rd birthday.
- The Los Angeles Lakers begin a string of nine consecutive seasons as the No. 1 seed in the Western Conference.
- The Denver Nuggets scored at least 100 points in every single game of the season, while also allowing 100 points in every game. It remains the only time this has occurred in NBA history.
- After a few years of success in NCAA basketball, the breakaway rim became standardized equipment in the NBA.
- This season marked Isiah Thomas' rookie season.
- The three-to-make-two free throw rule, along with the two-to-make one rule (both used when a team exceeded five team fouls in a quarter), were both eliminated.
- This season marked Bob Dandridge's final season.

Coaching changes
Offseason
Team	1980–81 coach	1981–82 coach
Atlanta Hawks	Mike Fratello	Kevin Loughery
Cleveland Cavaliers	Don Delaney	Bob Kloppenburg
New Jersey Nets	Bob MacKinnon	Larry Brown
In-season
Team	Outgoing coach	Incoming coach
Chicago Bulls	Jerry Sloan	Phil Johnson
Chicago Bulls	Phil Johnson	Rod Thorn
Cleveland Cavaliers	Bob Kloppenburg	Chuck Daly
Cleveland Cavaliers	Chuck Daly	Bill Musselman
Los Angeles Lakers	Paul Westhead	Pat Riley
Utah Jazz	Tom Nissalke	Frank Layden

== Final standings ==
=== By division ===
Atlantic Division	W	L	PCT	GB	Home	Road	Div
y-Boston Celtics	63	19	.768	–	35–6	28–13	20–4
x-Philadelphia 76ers	58	24	.707	5.0	32–9	26–15	16–8
x-New Jersey Nets	44	38	.537	19.0	25–16	19–22	12–12
x-Washington Bullets	43	39	.524	20.0	22–19	21–20	7–17
New York Knicks	33	49	.402	30.0	19–22	14–27	5–19

Central Division	W	L	PCT	GB	Home	Road	Div
y-Milwaukee Bucks	55	27	.671	–	31–10	24–17	24–6
x-Atlanta Hawks	42	40	.512	13.0	24–17	18–23	15–14
Detroit Pistons	39	43	.476	16.0	23–18	16–25	19–11
Indiana Pacers	35	47	.427	20.0	25–16	10–31	14–16
Chicago Bulls	34	48	.415	21.0	22–19	12–29	12–17
Cleveland Cavaliers	15	67	.183	40.0	9–32	6–35	5–25

Midwest Division	W	L	PCT	GB	Home	Road	Div
y-San Antonio Spurs	48	34	.585	–	29–12	19–22	20–10
x-Denver Nuggets	46	36	.561	2.0	29–12	17–24	19–11
x-Houston Rockets	46	36	.561	2.0	25–16	21–20	17–13
Kansas City Kings	30	52	.366	18.0	23–18	7–34	11–19
Dallas Mavericks	28	54	.341	20.0	16–25	12–29	11–19
Utah Jazz	25	57	.305	23.0	18–23	7–34	9–21

Pacific Division	W	L	PCT	GB	Home	Road	Div
y-Los Angeles Lakers	57	25	.695	–	30–11	27–14	21–9
x-Seattle SuperSonics	52	30	.634	5.0	31–10	21–20	18–12
x-Phoenix Suns	46	36	.561	11.0	31–10	15–26	14–16
Golden State Warriors	45	37	.549	12.0	28–13	17–24	15–15
Portland Trail Blazers	42	40	.512	15.0	27–14	15–26	15–15
San Diego Clippers	17	65	.207	40.0	11–30	6–35	7–23

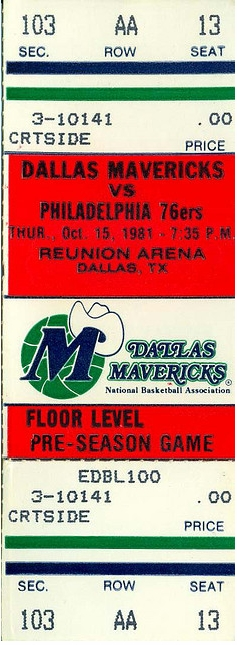
A ticket for an October 1981 pre-season game between the Dallas Mavericks and the season's eventual Eastern Conference champions Philadelphia 76ers.

=== By conference ===
#	Eastern Conference				
#	Team	W	L	PCT	GB
1	z-Boston Celtics	63	19	.768	–
2	y-Milwaukee Bucks	55	27	.671	8
3	x-Philadelphia 76ers	58	24	.707	5
4	x-New Jersey Nets	44	38	.537	19
5	x-Washington Bullets	43	39	.524	20
6	x-Atlanta Hawks	42	40	.512	21
7	Detroit Pistons	39	43	.476	24
8	Indiana Pacers	35	47	.427	28
9	Chicago Bulls	34	48	.415	29
10	New York Knicks	33	49	.402	30
11	Cleveland Cavaliers	15	67	.183	48

#	Western Conference				
#	Team	W	L	PCT	GB
1	c-Los Angeles Lakers	57	25	.695	–
2	y-San Antonio Spurs	48	34	.585	9
3	x-Seattle SuperSonics	52	30	.634	5
4	x-Denver Nuggets	46	36	.561	11
5	x-Phoenix Suns	46	36	.561	11
6	x-Houston Rockets	46	36	.561	11
7	Golden State Warriors	45	37	.549	12
8	Portland Trail Blazers	42	40	.512	15
9	Kansas City Kings	30	52	.366	27
10	Dallas Mavericks	28	54	.341	29
11	Utah Jazz	25	57	.305	32
12	San Diego Clippers	17	65	.207	40

Notes

- z – Clinched home court advantage for the entire playoffs and first round bye
- c – Clinched home court advantage for the conference playoffs and first round bye
- y – Clinched division title and first round bye
- x – Clinched playoff spot

== Playoffs ==
Teams in bold advanced to the next round. The numbers to the left of each team indicate the team's seeding in its conference, and the numbers to the right indicate the number of games the team won in that round. The division champions are marked by an asterisk. Home court advantage does not necessarily belong to the higher-seeded team, but instead the team with the better regular season record; teams enjoying the home advantage are shown in italics.

First Round
E4	New Jersey	0
**E5**	**Washington**	**2**
**E3**	**Philadelphia**	**2**
E6	Atlanta	0
W4	Denver	1
**W5**	**Phoenix**	**2**
**W3**	**Seattle**	**2**
W6	Houston	1

Conference Semifinals
**E1**	**Boston***	**4**
E5	Washington	1
**Eastern Conference**
**E3**	**Philadelphia**	**4**
E2	Milwaukee*	2
**W1**	**Los Angeles***	**4**
W5	Phoenix	0
**Western Conference**
W3	Seattle	1
**W2**	**San Antonio***	**4**

Conference Finals
E1	Boston*	3
**E3**	**Philadelphia**	**4**
**W1**	**Los Angeles***	**4**
W2	San Antonio*	0

NBA Finals
E3	Philadelphia	2
**W1**	**Los Angeles***	**4**

- * Division winner
- **Bold** Series winner
- Italic Team with home-court advantage

== Statistics leaders ==
Category	Player	Team	Stat
Points per game	George Gervin	San Antonio Spurs	32.3
Rebounds per game	Moses Malone	Houston Rockets	14.7
Assists per game	Johnny Moore	San Antonio Spurs	9.6
Steals per game	Magic Johnson	Los Angeles Lakers	2.67
Blocks per game	George Johnson	San Antonio Spurs	3.12
FG%	Artis Gilmore	Chicago Bulls	.652
FT%	Kyle Macy	Phoenix Suns	.899
3FG%	Campy Russell	New York Knicks	.439

== NBA awards ==
- Most Valuable Player: Moses Malone, Houston Rockets
- Rookie of the Year: Buck Williams, New Jersey Nets
- Coach of the Year: Gene Shue, Washington Bullets

- All-NBA First Team:
  - F – Larry Bird, Boston Celtics
  - F – Julius Erving, Philadelphia 76ers
  - C – Moses Malone, Houston Rockets
  - G – George Gervin, San Antonio Spurs
  - G – Gus Williams, Seattle SuperSonics
- All-NBA Second Team:
  - F – Alex English, Denver Nuggets
  - F – Bernard King, Golden State Warriors
  - C – Robert Parish, Boston Celtics
  - G – Magic Johnson, Los Angeles Lakers
  - G – Sidney Moncrief, Milwaukee Bucks

- All-NBA Rookie Team:
  - Buck Williams, New Jersey Nets
  - Jay Vincent, Dallas Mavericks
  - Kelly Tripucka, Detroit Pistons
  - Isiah Thomas, Detroit Pistons
  - Jeff Ruland, Washington Bullets

- NBA All-Defensive First Team:
  - Bobby Jones, Philadelphia 76ers
  - Caldwell Jones, Philadelphia 76ers
  - Michael Cooper, Los Angeles Lakers
  - Dennis Johnson, Phoenix Suns
  - Dan Roundfield, Atlanta Hawks
- NBA All-Defensive Second Team:
  - Larry Bird, Boston Celtics
  - Quinn Buckner, Milwaukee Bucks
  - Lonnie Shelton, Seattle SuperSonics
  - Sidney Moncrief, Milwaukee Bucks
  - Jack Sikma, Seattle SuperSonics

== See also ==
- List of NBA regular season records
