= 1981–82 Golden State Warriors season =

NBA professional basketball team season

- Head coach: Al Attles
- Arena: Oakland-Alameda County Coliseum Arena

Results
- Record: 45–37 (.549)
- Place: Division: 4th (Pacific); Conference: 7th (Western)
- Playoff finish: Did not qualify
- Stats at Basketball Reference

The 1981–82 Golden State Warriors season was the Warriors' 36th season in the NBA and 19th in the San Francisco Bay Area.

== Draft picks ==
Round	Pick	Player	Position	Nationality	College
2	33	Sam Williams	F	United States	Arizona State
3	56	Carlton Neverson		United States	Pittsburgh
4	76	Lewis Lloyd	SG/SF	United States	Drake
4	80	Terry Adolph		United States	West Texas A&M
5	102	Hank McDowell	PF/C	United States	Memphis
6	126	Carter Scott		United States	Ohio State
7	148	Robby Dosty		United States	Arizona
8	171	Yasutaka Okayama	C	Japan	
9	192	Doug Murrey		United States	San Jose State
10	213	Barry Brooks		United States	Southern California

== Roster ==
Golden State Warriors roster
Players

Pos.	No.	Player	Height	Weight	DOB	From
C	23	Rickey Brown	6 ft 10 in (2.08 m)	215 lb (98 kg)		Mississippi State
C	2	Joe Barry Carroll	7 ft 0 in (2.13 m)	225 lb (102 kg)		Purdue
G	21	World B. Free	6 ft 2 in (1.88 m)	185 lb (84 kg)		Guilford
G	12	Mike Gale	6 ft 4 in (1.93 m)	185 lb (84 kg)		Elizabeth City State
G	10	Joe Hassett	6 ft 5 in (1.96 m)	180 lb (82 kg)		Providence
F	30	Bernard King	6 ft 7 in (2.01 m)	205 lb (93 kg)		Tennessee
G	32	Lewis Lloyd	6 ft 6 in (1.98 m)	205 lb (93 kg)		Drake
F	44	Hank McDowell	6 ft 9 in (2.06 m)	215 lb (98 kg)		Memphis
G/F	22	Sonny Parker	6 ft 6 in (1.98 m)	200 lb (91 kg)		Texas A&M
G	18	Lorenzo Romar	6 ft 1 in (1.85 m)	175 lb (79 kg)		Washington
G/F	45	Purvis Short	6 ft 7 in (2.01 m)	210 lb (95 kg)		Jackson State
F	13	Larry Smith	6 ft 8 in (2.03 m)	215 lb (98 kg)		Alcorn State
F	33	Sam Williams	6 ft 8 in (2.03 m)	210 lb (95 kg)		Arizona State

Coaches
Head coach
- Al Attles (North Carolina A&T)
Assistant(s)
- Johnny Bach (Fordham)

Legend
- (DP) Unsigned draft pick
- (FA) Free agent
- (S) Suspended
- Injured

== Regular season ==
=== Season standings ===
Pacific Division	W	L	PCT	GB	Home	Road	Div
y-Los Angeles Lakers	57	25	.695	–	30–11	27–14	21–9
x-Seattle SuperSonics	52	30	.634	5.0	31–10	21–20	18–12
x-Phoenix Suns	46	36	.561	11.0	31–10	15–26	14–16
Golden State Warriors	45	37	.549	12.0	28–13	17–24	15–15
Portland Trail Blazers	42	40	.512	15.0	27–14	15–26	15–15
San Diego Clippers	17	65	.207	40.0	11–30	6–35	7–23

#	Western Conference				
#	Team	W	L	PCT	GB
1	c-Los Angeles Lakers	57	25	.695	–
2	y-San Antonio Spurs	48	34	.585	9
3	x-Seattle SuperSonics	52	30	.634	5
4	x-Denver Nuggets	46	36	.561	11
5	x-Phoenix Suns	46	36	.561	11
6	x-Houston Rockets	46	36	.561	11
7	Golden State Warriors	45	37	.549	12
8	Portland Trail Blazers	42	40	.512	15
9	Kansas City Kings	30	52	.366	27
10	Dallas Mavericks	28	54	.341	29
11	Utah Jazz	25	57	.305	32
12	San Diego Clippers	17	65	.207	40

z - clinched division title
y - clinched division title
x - clinched playoff spot

== Player statistics ==
Legend
GP	Games played	GS	Games started	MPG	Minutes per game
FG%	Field-goal percentage	3P%	3-point field-goal percentage	FT%	Free-throw percentage
RPG	Rebounds per game	APG	Assists per game	SPG	Steals per game
BPG	Blocks per game	PPG	Points per game

== Awards and records ==
- Bernard King, All-NBA Second Team

== See also ==
- 1981-82 NBA season
