= Yonakor =

Yonakor is a surname. Notable people with the surname include:

- John Yonakor (1921–2001), American football player
- Rich Yonakor (1958–2022), American basketball player, son of John
