= Fegley (surname) =

Fegley is a surname of German origin, being an Americanized form of several German and Swiss German surnames. Notable people with the surname include:

- Clayton Fegley, American politician
- Oakes Fegley (born 2004), American actor
- Richard Fegley (1936-2001), American professional photographer
- Winslow Fegley (born 2009), American child actor

== See also ==
- Fegley, Missouri, an unincorporated community in Missouri
- Fegley Glacier, a tributary glacier in the Holland Range of Antarctica
- Phegley
- Vögele
- Vogler (surname)
