= Ed Sherod =

American basketball player and coach

Ed Sherrod
Personal information
- Born: September 13, 1959 (age 67) Richmond, Virginia, U.S.
- Listed height: 6 ft 2 in (1.88 m)
- Listed weight: 170 lb (77 kg)

Career information
- High school: John Marshall (Richmond, Virginia)
- College: VCU (1978–1981)
- NBA draft: 1981: 4th round, 72nd overall pick
- Drafted by: New Jersey Nets
- Playing career: 1981–1984
- Position: Point guard
- Number: 13
- Coaching career: 1989–1990

Career history

Playing
- 1981–1982: Lancaster Lightning
- 1982–1983: New York Knicks
- 1983–1984: Wisconsin Flyers

Coaching
- 1989–1990: VCU (women)

Career highlights
- CBA champion (1982); CBA Playoff/Finals MVP (1982); Sun Belt Conference tournament MVP (1980)

Career statistics
- Points: 395 (6.2 ppg)
- Assists: 311 (4.9 apg)
- Rebounds: 149 (2.3 rpg)
- Stats at NBA.com
- Stats at Basketball Reference

Edmund Sherod (born September 13, 1959) is an American former professional basketball player.

A 6'2" point guard born in Richmond, Virginia, Sherod played scholastically at John Marshall High School. He attended Virginia Commonwealth University (VCU) from 1977 to 1981. There, he tallied a then-school record 582 assists and participated in two NCAA men's basketball tournaments. He led the Sun Belt Conference in assists as a junior and senior.

Sherod was selected by the New Jersey Nets in the fourth round of the 1981 NBA draft but cut in the preseason. He played the remainder of the regular season in the Continental Basketball Association with the Lancaster Lightning. He won a CBA championship with the Lightning in 1982. He was selected as the CBA Playoff/Finals Most Valuable Player. Sherod made NBA history by becoming the first-ever player to make his debut in the postseason, in Game 1 with New Jersey against Washington in the 1981 Eastern Conference First Round. Sherod then played one season (1982–83) in the National Basketball Association as a member of the New York Knicks, averaging 6.2 points per game and 4.9 assists per game.

From 1989 to 1990, he served as head coach for VCU's women's basketball team.

Sherod's son played college basketball for Old Dominion and his grandson played at Richmond.

== Career statistics ==
Legend
GP	Games played	GS	Games started	MPG	Minutes per game
FG%	Field goal percentage	3P%	3-point field goal percentage	FT%	Free throw percentage
RPG	Rebounds per game	APG	Assists per game	SPG	Steals per game
BPG	Blocks per game	PPG	Points per game	**Bold**	Career high

=== NBA ===
==== Regular season ====
Year	Team	GP	GS	MPG	FG%	3P%	FT%	RPG	APG	SPG	BPG	PPG
1982–83	New York	64	37	25.4	.406	.077	.650	2.3	4.9	1.5	.2	6.2

==== Playoffs ====
Year	Team	GP	MPG	FG%	3P%	FT%	RPG	APG	SPG	BPG	PPG
1982	New Jersey	2	**4.0**	.000	–	–	**.5**	.5	.5	.0	.0
1983	New York	**4**	3.8	**.250**	–	–	.3	**.8**	**.8**	.0	**.5**
Career		6	3.9	.200	–	–	.3	.7	.7	.0	.3
