= Ed Rains =

American basketball player

Personal information
- Born: December 24, 1956 (age 69) Ocala, Florida, U.S.
- Listed height: 6 ft 7 in (2.01 m)
- Listed weight: 190 lb (86 kg)

Career information
- High school: Forest (Ocala, Florida)
- College: South Alabama (1977–1981)
- NBA draft: 1981: 2nd round, 30th overall pick
- Drafted by: San Antonio Spurs
- Position: Small forward
- Number: 15

Career history
- 1981–1983: San Antonio Spurs

Career highlights
- Sun Belt Player of the Year (1981); 2× First-team All-Sun Belt (1980, 1981); No. 15 retired by South Alabama Jaguars
- Stats at NBA.com
- Stats at Basketball Reference

Edward Eugene Rains (born December 24, 1956) is an American former professional basketball player. He played for the San Antonio Spurs of the National Basketball Association (NBA). Rains played college basketball for the South Alabama Jaguars.

== College ==
Rains played college basketball for the University of South Alabama from 1977 to 1981. In his college career, he scored 1,801 points (15.7 per game) and in his senior season was named the Sun Belt Conference Player of the Year.

== Professional career ==
After the close of his college career, Rains was drafted by the San Antonio Spurs of the NBA in the second round of the 1981 NBA draft (30th pick overall). He appeared in 83 games for the Spurs over two seasons, averaging 3.5 points per game. He was the first player from South Alabama to appear in an NBA game.

== Career statistics ==
Legend
| GP | Games played | GS | Games started | MPG | Minutes per game |
| FG% | Field goal percentage | 3P% | 3-point field goal percentage | FT% | Free throw percentage |
| RPG | Rebounds per game | APG | Assists per game | SPG | Steals per game |
| BPG | Blocks per game | PPG | Points per game | **Bold** | Career high |

=== NBA ===
==== Regular season ====
| Year | Team | GP | GS | MPG | FG% | 3P% | FT% | RPG | APG | SPG | BPG | PPG |
|---|---|---|---|---|---|---|---|---|---|---|---|---|
| 1981–82 | San Antonio | **49** | **15** | **13.0** | **.435** | .000 | .594 | **1.6** | **.8** | **.4** | .0 | **3.9** |
| 1982–83 | San Antonio | 34 | 1 | 8.6 | .398 | .000 | **.674** | 1.3 | .6 | .3 | .0 | 2.8 |
| Career | | 83 | 16 | 11.2 | .423 | .000 | .626 | 1.5 | .7 | .3 | .0 | 3.5 |

==== Playoffs ====
| Year | Team | GP | MPG | FG% | 3P% | FT% | RPG | APG | SPG | BPG | PPG |
|---|---|---|---|---|---|---|---|---|---|---|---|
| 1982 | San Antonio | **5** | **6.0** | **.500** | – | **.444** | **1.6** | .2 | **.2** | .0 | **2.0** |
| 1983 | San Antonio | 3 | 3.7 | .400 | .000 | – | .3 | **.3** | .0 | .0 | 1.3 |
| Career | | 8 | 5.1 | .455 | .000 | .444 | 1.1 | .3 | .1 | .0 | 1.8 |
