= Ray Williams (basketball) =

American basketball player (1954–2013)

Personal information
- Born: October 14, 1954 Mount Vernon, New York, U.S.
- Died: March 22, 2013 (aged 58) New York City, New York, U.S.
- Listed height: 6 ft 3 in (1.91 m)
- Listed weight: 188 lb (85 kg)

Career information
- High school: Mount Vernon (Mount Vernon, New York)
- College: San Jacinto (1973–1975); Minnesota (1975–1977)
- NBA draft: 1977: 1st round, 10th overall pick
- Drafted by: New York Knicks
- Playing career: 1977–1987
- Position: Point guard
- Number: 13, 25, 20, 1, 11

Career history
- 1977–1981: New York Knicks
- 1981–1982: New Jersey Nets
- 1982–1983: Kansas City Kings
- 1983–1984: New York Knicks
- 1985: Boston Celtics
- 1985: Atlanta Hawks
- 1986: San Antonio Spurs
- 1986–1987: New Jersey Nets

Career NBA statistics
- Points: 10,158 (15.5 ppg)
- Assists: 3,779 (5.8 apg)
- Steals: 1,198 (1.8 spg)
- Stats at NBA.com
- Stats at Basketball Reference

Thomas Ray Williams (October 14, 1954 – March 22, 2013) was an American professional basketball player who played in the National Basketball Association (NBA) from 1977 to 1987. Born in Mount Vernon, New York, he was the younger brother of Gus Williams, who also played in the NBA.

== High school and college careers ==
Williams attended Mount Vernon High School and helped lead the school to two New York State basketball championships.

After attending San Jacinto Junior College, Williams played at the University of Minnesota from 1975 to 1977. During that time, he averaged 18.9 ppg and 6.6 rpg.

== NBA career ==
Williams was selected by the New York Knicks in the first round of the 1977 NBA draft (10th pick overall).

After a quiet first season, he improved his effectiveness on the court, averaging 20.9 ppg, 5 rpg, and 6.2 apg during his third season (1979–80) and becoming the team captain during his fourth season. During his time with the Knicks, he reached the NBA playoffs twice.

After four seasons with the Knicks, Williams was traded to the New Jersey Nets on October 25, 1981, in exchange for Maurice Lucas. With the Nets, Williams averaged 20.4 ppg, 4 rpg, and 6 apg (1981–82 season). On April 17, 1982, Williams scored 52 points in a game against the Detroit Pistons, for the highest-scoring game of his career, and the highest in Nets history until he was surpassed by Deron Williams's 57-point game on March 4, 2012 (Julius Erving still holds the Nets franchise record with 63 points on February 14, 1975). Williams eventually helped the Nets reach the 1982 NBA Playoffs where he averaged 17 ppg, 6 rpg, and 7 apg. However, they ended up being eliminated by the Washington Bullets in the first round.

On June 29, 1982, the Nets traded Williams to the Kansas City Kings for Phil Ford. After one season, they traded him back to the New York Knicks for Billy Knight and an amount of cash. He reached the playoffs once again with the Knicks, averaging 11.2 ppg and 8 apg.

In the middle of the 1984–85 season, Williams signed as a free agent with the Boston Celtics, in exchange for two future draft picks. During this year, he had the chance to play with Larry Bird and Kevin McHale. With Boston, he reached the playoffs one last time. This time, the Celtics reached the Finals, but were eliminated by the Los Angeles Lakers.

Before the 1985–86 season, Williams signed with the Los Angeles Clippers, with Boston receiving a future draft pick as compensation. The Clippers, however, waived him before the season began.

Williams eventually signed with the Atlanta Hawks. After 19 games, he was waived by the Hawks, but signed with the San Antonio Spurs later. After 23 games, he was also waived by the Spurs and claimed by the Nets. Williams played the remainder of the season with them and remained with the team during the next season, after which he retired. Williams ended with a career average of 15.5 ppg, 5.8 apg, and 3.6 rpg.

=== NBA career statistics ===
Legend
GP	Games played	GS	Games started	MPG	Minutes per game
FG%	Field goal percentage	3P%	3-point field goal percentage	FT%	Free throw percentage
RPG	Rebounds per game	APG	Assists per game	SPG	Steals per game
BPG	Blocks per game	PPG	Points per game	**Bold**	Career high

==== Regular season ====
Year	Team	GP	GS	MPG	FG%	3P%	FT%	RPG	APG	SPG	BPG	PPG
1977–78	New York	81	...	19.1	.443	...	.705	2.6	4.5	1.3	0.2	9.3
1978–79	New York	81	...	29.3	.457	...	.802	3.6	6.2	1.6	0.2	17.3
1979–80	New York	**82**	...	31.5	**.496**	.189	.787	**5.0**	6.2	2.0	0.3	**20.9**
1980–81	New York	79	...	**34.7**	.461	.235	.817	4.1	5.5	2.3	**0.5**	19.7
1981–82	New Jersey	**82**	**69**	33.3	.462	.167	.832	4.0	6.0	**2.4**	**0.5**	20.4
1982–83	Kansas City	72	68	30.1	.392	.203	.769	4.5	**7.9**	1.7	0.4	15.4
1983–84	New York	76	63	29.3	.445	.309	.827	3.5	5.9	2.1	0.3	14.8
1984–85	Boston	23	5	20.0	.385	.261	.674	2.5	3.9	1.3	0.2	6.4
1985–86	Atlanta	19	12	19.3	.399	**.364**	.854	2.4	3.5	1.5	0.1	8.4
1985–86	San Antonio	23	9	17.3	.382	.333	**.969**	1.6	4.8	1.2	0.1	7.1
1985–86	New Jersey	5	0	12.6	.313	.000	.857	0.8	1.8	1.0	0.0	6.4
1986–87	New Jersey	32	14	25.0	.452	.250	.817	2.3	5.8	1.2	0.3	9.9
Career		655	240	28.2	.451	.237	.802	3.6	5.8	1.8	0.3	15.5

==== Playoffs ====
Year	Team	GP	GS	MPG	FG%	3P%	FT%	RPG	APG	SPG	BPG	PPG
1978	New York	6	...	23.3	.526	...	.885	2.5	5.2	1.0	0.0	17.5
1981	New York	2	...	**42.0**	**.439**	.333	.545	4.0	4.5	**2.0**	0.0	**21.5**
1982	New Jersey	2	...	38.5	.298	**.400**	.800	**6.0**	7.0	**2.0**	0.0	17.0
1984	New York	11	...	28.2	.354	.167	.744	3.5	**8.0**	1.5	**0.1**	11.2
1985	Boston	**19**	0	14.6	.405	.133	**.960**	1.9	3.2	0.6	**0.1**	6.3
Career		40	...	22.2	.403	.200	.811	2.8	5.1	1.1	0.1	10.6

== Post-NBA career ==
After his retirement, Williams struggled financially, eventually filing for bankruptcy in 1994, which led him to lose his home and family. Williams decided to apply early for his NBA pension of $200,000. After he received it, he moved to Florida, where he fell victim to a real estate scam that worsened his financial condition.

After that, Williams worked various jobs like groundskeeper at a golf course in Central Florida, apartment complex maintenance man, part-time girls basketball coach, and bakery worker, among others. During that time, he also received grants from the NBA Retired Players Association totaling $10,000.

According to a profile published in The Boston Globe in July 2010, he was unemployed and homeless, living inside a car in Pompano Beach, Florida. Williams spent his time fishing at the Hillboro Inlet Park in Pompano Beach, to help maintain himself. In November 2010, Williams's luck began to turn around as he took a job in Mount Vernon, New York, working for the city's Recreation Department as a "Recreation Specialist." Mount Vernon Mayor Clinton I. Young Jr. was instrumental in bringing Williams back to his hometown. Williams was also helped by Linda Crawford, a nurse and a friend from his NBA days. Williams married Linda Crawford in August 2011.

== Death ==
Williams died March 22, 2013, at Memorial Sloan–Kettering Cancer Center in New York City after suffering from colon cancer. Williams was 58.
