= Roger Phegley =

American basketball player

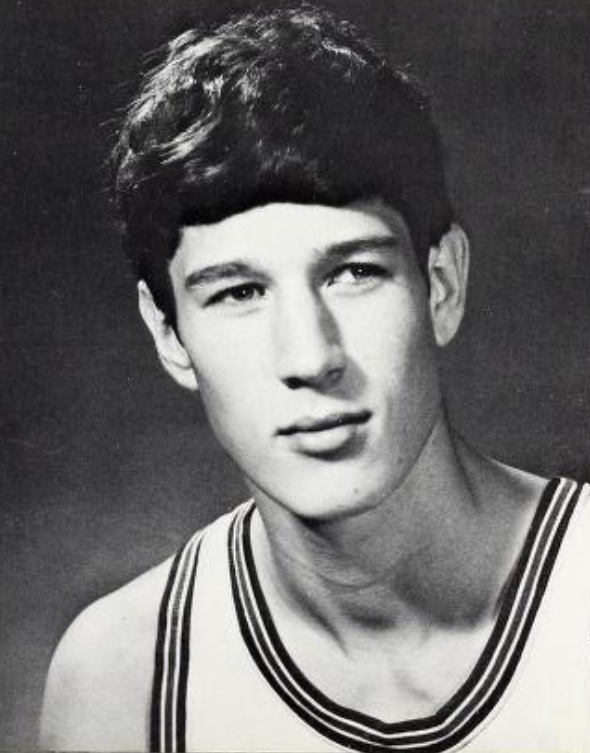
- Phegley as a junior at Bradley

Personal information
- Born: October 16, 1956 (age 70) East Peoria, Illinois, U.S.
- Listed height: 6 ft 6 in (1.98 m)
- Listed weight: 205 lb (93 kg)

Career information
- High school: East Peoria (East Peoria, Illinois)
- College: Bradley (1974–1978)
- NBA draft: 1978: 1st round, 14th overall pick
- Drafted by: Washington Bullets
- Playing career: 1978–1985
- Position: Shooting guard
- Number: 22, 15, 21

Career history
- 1978–1980: Washington Bullets
- 1980: New Jersey Nets
- 1980–1981: Cleveland Cavaliers
- 1981–1983: San Antonio Spurs
- 1983–1984: Dallas Mavericks
- 1984–1985: Olympique Antibes

Career highlights
- Third-team All-American – NABC (1978); MVC Player of the Year (1977); 2× First-team All-MVC (1977, 1978); No. 45 retired by Bradley Braves

Career NBA statistics
- Points: 3,011 (8.7 ppg)
- Rebounds: 702 (2.0 rpg)
- Assists: 486 (1.4 apg)
- Stats at NBA.com
- Stats at Basketball Reference

Roger Dale Phegley (born October 16, 1956) is an American former professional basketball player. A 6-foot-6-inch (198 cm) 205 pounds (93 kg) shooting guard, he played college basketball for the Bradley Braves and had a career in the National Basketball Association (NBA) from 1978 to 1984. He ended his career playing in France.

== High school and college career ==
Phegley was both a basketball and baseball standout at East Peoria High School. As a pitcher, he played a significant role in East Peoria's making the state baseball tournament for the first time. He even played briefly as a pitcher at Bradley University. During his college basketball career Phegley was named an All-American by Converse in 1978 and a third-team choice by the Associated Press and United Press International. He was Missouri Valley Conference Player of the Year in 1977, and was an all-Missouri Valley Conference selection in 1977 and 1978.

== NBA career and beyond ==
He was selected by the Washington Bullets with the 14th overall pick in the 1978 NBA draft. He averaged 8.7 points per game over his NBA career with the Washington Bullets, New Jersey Nets, Cleveland Cavaliers, San Antonio Spurs and Dallas Mavericks.

He lives in Morton, Illinois, where he works as an insurance agent with offices in Peoria.

== Career statistics ==
Legend
GP	Games played	GS	Games started	MPG	Minutes per game
FG%	Field goal percentage	3P%	3-point field goal percentage	FT%	Free throw percentage
RPG	Rebounds per game	APG	Assists per game	SPG	Steals per game
BPG	Blocks per game	PPG	Points per game	**Bold**	Career high

=== NBA ===
==== Regular season ====
Year	Team	GP	GS	MPG	FG%	3P%	FT%	RPG	APG	SPG	BPG	PPG
1978–79	Washington	29		5.3	.359		.828	.8	.5	.2	.1	2.8
1979–80	Washington	50		19.4	.474	.400	.867	2.3	1.4	.4	.1	11.1
1979–80	New Jersey	28		19.3	.485	.500	.880	2.5	1.1	.5	.1	11.7
1980–81	Cleveland	**82**		**27.7**	.491	.286	.839	**3.0**	**2.2**	**.8**	**.2**	**14.4**
1981–82	Cleveland	27	**8**	21.0	.486	.308	.800	2.6	2.0	.6	.1	9.2
1981–82	San Antonio	54	1	11.4	.440	.056	.766	1.5	1.1	.5	.1	5.7
1982–83	San Antonio	62	4	9.7	.449	.214	.768	1.4	1.0	.5	.1	4.6
1983–84	San Antonio	3	0	3.7	**.500**	**1.000**	**1.000**	.7	.7	.0	.0	2.3
1983–84	Dallas	10	0	7.6	.290	.250	**1.000**	.9	.9	.1	.0	2.1
Career		345	13	16.8	.470	.253	.834	2.0	1.4	.5	.1	8.7

==== Playoffs ====
Year	Team	GP	MPG	FG%	3P%	FT%	RPG	APG	SPG	BPG	PPG
1982	San Antonio	5	1.2	.000	.000	–	.0	.0	.0	.0	.0
1983	San Antonio	**8**	4.8	**.529**	**.750**	.750	**1.0**	.1	.0	.0	**3.0**
1984	Dallas	1	**5.0**	.000	.000	**1.000**	.0	**1.0**	**2.0**	.0	2.0
Career		14	3.5	.391	.500	.833	.6	.1	.1	.0	1.9
