= 1985–86 Chicago Bulls season =

NBA professional basketball team season

- Head coach: Stan Albeck
- General manager: Jerry Krause
- Owner: Jerry Reinsdorf
- Arena: Chicago Stadium

Results
- Record: 30–52 (.366)
- Place: Division: 4th (Central); Conference: 8th (Eastern)
- Playoff finish: First round (lost to Celtics 0–3)
- Stats at Basketball Reference

Local media
- Television: WFLD; Sportsvision (Jim Durham, Johnny “Red” Kerr)
- Radio: WMAQ (Jim Durham, Johnny “Red” Kerr)

The 1985–86 Chicago Bulls season was the 20th season of the franchise in the National Basketball Association (NBA). During the offseason, they acquired forward Charles Oakley from the Cleveland Cavaliers, veteran guard George Gervin from the San Antonio Spurs and signed free agent guards Kyle Macy and John Paxson. The season was a near disaster as Michael Jordan was lost for much of the regular season due to a broken foot. Despite the injury to Jordan, the team managed to qualify for the NBA Playoffs.

== Offseason ==
=== NBA draft ===
The 1985 NBA draft took place on June 18, 1985. It was also the first NBA Draft of the "Lottery" era. The lottery was put into place so teams did not intentionally lose games to receive the number one pick.

Round	Pick	Player	Position	Nationality	School/Club team
1	11	Keith Lee	Center	United States	Memphis State
2	28	Ken Johnson	Forward	United States	Michigan State
2	34	Aubrey Sherrod	Guard	United States	Wichita State
2	46	Adrian Branch	Forward	United States	Maryland

== Roster ==
1985–86 Chicago Bulls roster
Players

Pos.	No.	Player	Height	Weight	DOB	From
F	20	Gene Banks	6 ft 7 in (2.01 m)	215 lb (98 kg)	1959-05-15	Duke
C	40	Dave Corzine	6 ft 11 in (2.11 m)	250 lb (113 kg)	1956-04-25	DePaul
G	10	Quintin Dailey	6 ft 3 in (1.91 m)	180 lb (82 kg)	1961-01-22	San Francisco
G	8	George Gervin	6 ft 7 in (2.01 m)	180 lb (82 kg)	1952-04-27	Eastern Michigan
F	21	Sidney Green	6 ft 9 in (2.06 m)	220 lb (100 kg)	1961-01-04	UNLV
G	32	Michael Holton	6 ft 4 in (1.93 m)	185 lb (84 kg)	1961-08-04	UCLA
G	23	Michael Jordan	6 ft 6 in (1.98 m)	195 lb (88 kg)	1963-02-17	North Carolina
G	24	Kyle Macy	6 ft 3 in (1.91 m)	175 lb (79 kg)	1957-04-09	Kentucky
F	34	Charles Oakley	6 ft 9 in (2.06 m)	225 lb (102 kg)	1963-12-18	Virginia Union
C	33	Jawann Oldham	7 ft 0 in (2.13 m)	215 lb (98 kg)	1957-07-04	Seattle
G	5	John Paxson	6 ft 2 in (1.88 m)	185 lb (84 kg)	1960-09-29	Notre Dame
C	52	Mike Smrek	7 ft 0 in (2.13 m)	250 lb (113 kg)	1962-08-31	Canisius
F	0	Orlando Woolridge	6 ft 9 in (2.06 m)	215 lb (98 kg)	1959-12-16	Notre Dame

Coaches
Head coach
- Stan Albeck
Assistant(s)
- Murray Arnold
- Mike Thibault
- Tex Winter

Legend
- (DP) Unsigned draft pick
- (FA) Free agent
- (S) Suspended
- Injured

Roster
Updated: March 27, 1986

== Regular season ==
- Michael Jordan's second season was cut short by a broken foot which caused him to miss 64 games. Despite Jordan's injury and a 30–52 record, the Bulls made the playoffs.
- C - Dave Corzine
- PF - Charles Oakley
- SF - Orlando Woolridge
- SG - Michael Jordan
- PG - Kyle Macy

=== Season standings ===
Central Division	W	L	PCT	GB	Home	Road	Div
y-Milwaukee Bucks	57	25	.695	–	33–8	24–17	21–9
x-Atlanta Hawks	50	32	.610	7	34–7	16–25	21–9
x-Detroit Pistons	46	36	.561	11	31–10	15–26	18–12
x-Chicago Bulls	30	52	.366	27	22–19	8–33	10–20
Cleveland Cavaliers	29	53	.354	28	16–25	13–28	10–19
Indiana Pacers	26	56	.317	31	19–22	7–34	9–20

#	Eastern Conference				
#	Team	W	L	PCT	GB
1	z-Boston Celtics	67	15	.817	–
2	y-Milwaukee Bucks	57	25	.695	10
3	x-Philadelphia 76ers	54	28	.659	13
4	x-Atlanta Hawks	50	32	.610	17
5	x-Detroit Pistons	46	36	.561	21
6	x-Washington Bullets	39	43	.476	28
7	x-New Jersey Nets	39	43	.476	28
8	x-Chicago Bulls	30	52	.366	37
9	Cleveland Cavaliers	29	53	.354	38
10	Indiana Pacers	26	56	.317	41
11	New York Knicks	23	59	.280	44

z - clinched conference title
y - clinched division title
x - clinched playoff spot

== Game log ==
=== Regular season ===
1985–86 game log
Total: 30–52 (Home: 20–21; Road: 10–31)
October: 3–1 (home: 2–0; road: 1–1)

Game	Date	Team	Score	High points	High rebounds	High assists	Location Attendance	Record
1
2
3
4

November: 4–11 (home: 2–2; road: 2–9)

Game	Date	Team	Score	High points	High rebounds	High assists	Location Attendance	Record
9	November 12	Milwaukee						
10	November 13	@ Philadelphia						
11	November 15	@ Milwaukee						
14	November 20	@ Atlanta						
17	November 26	@ Denver						

December: 6–9 (home: 4–4; road: 2–5)

Game	Date	Team	Score	High points	High rebounds	High assists	Location Attendance	Record
20	December 1	@ L.A. Lakers						
24	December 7	@ Houston						
26	December 12	Philadelphia						
28	December 15	@ Boston						
29	December 17	Boston						

January: 3–10 (home: 3–6; road: 0–4)

Game	Date	Team	Score	High points	High rebounds	High assists	Location Attendance	Record
36	January 4	Atlanta						
41	January 17	Philadelphia						
43	January 20	L.A. Lakers						
45	January 27	@ Dallas						
47	January 30	Boston						

February: 5–9 (home: 4–4; road: 1–5)

Game	Date	Team	Score	High points	High rebounds	High assists	Location Attendance	Record
48	February 1	Houston						
51	February 6	@ Milwaukee						
52	February 12	@ Philadelphia						
54	February 15	Dallas						
60	February 25	Philadelphia						

March: 5–8 (home: 4–2; road: 1–6)

Game	Date	Team	Score	High points	High rebounds	High assists	Location Attendance	Record
62	March 4	Boston						
63	March 5	@ Boston						
64	March 7	Atlanta						
67	March 13	Denver						
68	March 15	Milwaukee						
69	March 17	@ Atlanta						
70	March 19	@ Philadelphia						
71	March 21	@ Boston						

April: 4–3 (home: 3–0; road: 1–3)

Game	Date	Team	Score	High points	High rebounds	High assists	Location Attendance	Record
76	April 1	@ Milwaukee						
78	April 5	Atlanta						
79	April 7	Milwaukee						
80	April 8	@ Atlanta						

1985–86 schedule

== Playoffs ==
At the time, the Bulls had the fifth worst record of any team to qualify for the playoffs in NBA history. Michael Jordan recovered in time to participate in the playoffs and performed well upon his return. Against a Boston Celtics team that is often considered one of the greatest in NBA history, Jordan set the still-unbroken record for points in a playoff game with 63 in game 2. The Celtics, however, managed to sweep the series.

1986 playoff game log
First Round: 0–3 (home: 0–1; road: 0–2)

Game	Date	Team	Score	High points	High rebounds	High assists	Location Attendance	Series
1	April 17	@ Boston	L 104–123	Michael Jordan (49)	Charles Oakley (10)	Macy, Paxson (4)	Boston Garden; 14,890	0–1
2	April 20	@ Boston	L 131–135 (2OT)	Michael Jordan (63)	Charles Oakley (14)	Michael Jordan (6)	Boston Garden; 14,890	0–2
3	April 22	Boston	L 104–122	John Paxson (23)	Dave Corzine (15)	Michael Jordan (9)	Chicago Stadium; 18,968	0–3

1986 schedule

== Player stats ==
Legend
GP	Games played	GS	Games started	MPG	Minutes per game
FG%	Field-goal percentage	3P%	3-point field-goal percentage	FT%	Free-throw percentage
RPG	Rebounds per game	APG	Assists per game	SPG	Steals per game
BPG	Blocks per game	PPG	Points per game

=== Regular season ===
Player	GP	GS	MPG	FG%	3P%	FT%	RPG	APG	SPG	BPG	PPG
Gene Banks	82	33	26.1	.517	.000	.718	4.4	3.1	.99	.12	10.9
Ron Brewer	4	0	4.5	.333	.000	1.000	.0	.0	.00	.00	1.8
Tony Brown	10	0	13.2	.439	.000	.692	1.6	1.4	.50	.10	4.5
Dave Corzine	67	4	25.5	.491	.250	.743	6.5	2.2	.42	.79	9.6
Quintin Dailey	35	0	20.7	.432	.000	.823	1.9	1.9	.63	.14	16.3
George Gervin	82	75	25.2	.472	.211	.879	2.6	1.8	.60	.28	16.2
Sidney Green	80	68	28.8	.465	.000	.782	8.2	1.7	.88	.46	13.4
Rod Higgins	5	0	16.2	.391	.000	.833	1.4	1.0	.80	.60	4.6
Mike Holton	24	0	18.6	.471	.100	.632	1.2	2.0	.96	.00	7.1
Michael Jordan	18	7	25.1	.457	.167	.840	3.6	2.9	2.06	1.17	22.7
Kyle Macy	82	79	29.6	.483	.411	.811	2.2	5.4	.99	.13	8.6
Billy McKinney	9	0	9.2	.435	.000	1.000	.6	1.4	.33	.00	2.4
Charles Oakley	77	30	23.0	.519	.000	.662	8.6	1.7	.88	.39	9.6
Jawann Oldham	52	47	24.5	.517	.000	.582	5.9	.7	.54	2.58	7.4
John Paxson	75	3	20.9	.466	.300	.804	1.3	3.7	.73	.03	5.3
Mike Smrek	38	5	10.7	.377	.000	.552	2.9	.5	.16	.61	2.8
Orlando Woolridge	70	59	32.1	.495	.174	.788	5.0	3.0	.70	.67	20.7

=== Playoffs ===
Player	GP	GS	MPG	FG%	3P%	FT%	RPG	APG	SPG	BPG	PPG
Gene Banks	3		23.0	.556	.000	.500	3.3	1.7	.33	.00	7.3
Dave Corzine	3		34.3	.552	.000	1.000	9.0	2.0	.33	.67	12.0
George Gervin	2		5.5	.000	.000	.000	.5	.5	.00	.00	.0
Sidney Green	3		17.7	.300	.000	.500	4.0	.0	.33	.33	6.0
Michael Jordan	3		45.0	.505	1.000	.872	6.3	5.7	2.33	1.33	43.7
Kyle Macy	3		29.0	.357	.250	1.000	1.3	3.3	.67	.00	4.0
Charles Oakley	3		29.3	.524	.000	.615	10.0	1.0	2.00	.67	10.0
Jawann Oldham	1		4.0	.000	.000	.000	2.0	.0	.00	.00	.0
John Paxson	3		26.7	.467	.000	.765	.0	1.7	1.00	.00	9.0
Mike Smrek	3		1.7	.000	.000	.000	.0	.0	.00	.33	.0
Orlando Woolridge	3		45.0	.403	.000	.867	4.7	1.3	1.00	.33	21.0

== Awards and honors ==
- Charles Oakley, NBA All-Rookie Team 1st Team
- Michael Jordan, NBA All-Star Game
