= Mike Bratz =

American basketball player (born 1955)

Personal information
- Born: October 17, 1955 (age 71) Lompoc, California, U.S.
- Listed height: 6 ft 2 in (1.88 m)
- Listed weight: 185 lb (84 kg)

Career information
- High school: Lompoc (Lompoc, California)
- College: Allan Hancock College (1973–1974); Stanford (1974–1977)
- NBA draft: 1977: 3rd round, 66th overall pick
- Drafted by: Phoenix Suns
- Playing career: 1977–1986
- Position: Point guard
- Number: 23, 11, 10

Career history

Playing
- 1977–1980: Phoenix Suns
- 1980–1981: Cleveland Cavaliers
- 1981–1982: San Antonio Spurs
- 1983: Chicago Bulls
- 1983–1985: Golden State Warriors
- 1985–1986: Sacramento Kings

Coaching
- 1991–1992; 1993–1998: Sacramento Kings (assistant)
- 1999–2000: Washington Wizards (assistant)
- 2002–2003; 2004–2005: Cleveland Cavaliers (assistant)

Career highlights
- First-team All-Pac-8 (1977)

Career statistics
- Points: 4,081 (7.0 ppg)
- Rebounds: 1,030 (1.8 rpg)
- Assists: 1,851 (3.2 apg)
- Stats at NBA.com
- Stats at Basketball Reference

Michael Louis Bratz (born October 17, 1955) is a retired American basketball player and former the assistant general manager for the Sacramento Kings. He played professionally in the NBA for the Phoenix Suns, Cleveland Cavaliers, San Antonio Spurs, Chicago Bulls, Golden State Warriors, and Sacramento Kings.

== Early life and career ==
Bratz was born in Lompoc, California, and graduated from Lompoc High School. He played college basketball at Allan Hancock College and Stanford University.

After being selected by the Phoenix Suns in the 1977 NBA draft, and made his NBA debut on October 18, 1977, with the Suns. Bratz played nine seasons in the NBA. He is famous for being the last Bulls player to wear number 23 prior to Michael Jordan. Referencing his time wearing number 23 while with the Bulls, Bratz appeared in a commercial for the Chicago area sports bar Candlelite in 2008. The commercial teased that he was Michael Jordan before being revealed on camera, to which he said "What, you're expecting someone else?"

== NBA career statistics ==
Legend
GP	Games played	GS	Games started	MPG	Minutes per game
FG%	Field goal percentage	3P%	3-point field goal percentage	FT%	Free throw percentage
RPG	Rebounds per game	APG	Assists per game	SPG	Steals per game
BPG	Blocks per game	PPG	Points per game	**Bold**	Career high
*	Led the league

=== Regular season ===
Year	Team	GP	GS	MPG	FG%	3P%	FT%	RPG	APG	SPG	BPG	PPG
1977–78	Phoenix	80	–	11.7	.403	–	.824	1.4	1.5	0.5	0.1	4.7
1978–79	Phoenix	77	–	16.8	**.454**	–	.818	1.8	2.3	0.8	0.1	8.1
1979–80	Phoenix	**82**	–	19.4	.392	.244	.870	2.0	2.7	1.1	0.1	8.5
1980–81	Cleveland	80	–	**32.4**	.390	**.337***	.811	**2.5**	**5.7**	**1.7**	**0.2**	**10.0**
1981–82	San Antonio	81	3	20.0	.407	.333	.783	2.0	5.4	0.8	0.1	7.7
1982–83	Chicago	15	0	9.3	.333	.125	.769	1.3	1.5	0.5	0.0	2.6
1983–84	Golden State	**82**	0	17.4	.409	.294	**.876**	1.7	3.1	1.0	0.1	6.8
1984–85	Golden State	56	6	13.3	.424	.231	.841	1.0	2.2	0.8	0.1	5.1
1985–86	Sacramento	33	0	8.2	.371	.286	.778	0.7	1.2	0.4	0.0	2.1
Career		586	9	18.1	.407	.305	.830	1.8	3.2	0.9	0.1	7.0

=== Playoffs ===
Year	Team	GP	GS	MPG	FG%	3P%	FT%	RPG	APG	SPG	BPG	PPG
1978	Phoenix	2	–	4.5	.200	–	–	0.0	0.5	0.0	0.0	1.0
1979	Phoenix	**15**	–	19.5	.496	–	.763	1.4	2.0	1.0	**0.2**	10.6
1980	Phoenix	8	–	**21.1**	**.512**	**.391**	.900	**2.5**	2.0	**1.1**	0.0	**13.0**
1982	San Antonio	9	–	20.0	.288	.278	.800	1.6	**5.3**	1.0	0.0	4.8
1986	Sacramento	3	0	5.0	.500	–	**1.000**	1.3	0.3	0.0	0.0	2.3
Career		37	0	18.0	.454	.341	.788	1.6	2.6	0.9	0.1	8.5
