= Mike Mitchell (basketball, born 1956) =

American basketball player

Personal information
- Born: January 1, 1956 Atlanta, Georgia, U.S.
- Died: June 9, 2011 (aged 55) San Antonio, Texas, U.S.
- Listed height: 6 ft 7 in (2.01 m)
- Listed weight: 234 lb (106 kg)

Career information
- High school: Luther Judson Price (Atlanta, Georgia)
- College: Auburn (1974–1978)
- NBA draft: 1978: 1st round, 15th overall pick
- Drafted by: Cleveland Cavaliers
- Playing career: 1978–1999
- Position: Small forward
- Number: 30, 34, 13

Career history
- 1978–1981: Cleveland Cavaliers
- 1981–1988: San Antonio Spurs
- 1988–1990: Filodoro Brescia
- 1990: San Antonio Spurs
- 1990–1991: Filodoro Napoli
- 1991–1992: Maccabi Tel Aviv
- 1992–1999: Reggiana

Career highlights
- NBA All-Star (1981); Italian League Top Scorer (1998); First-team All-SEC (1978); 2× Second-team All-SEC (1976, 1977); Third-team All-SEC (1975); No. 30 retired by Auburn Tigers; First-team Parade All-American (1974)

Career NBA statistics
- Points: 15,016 (19.8 ppg)
- Rebounds: 4,246 (5.6 rpg)
- Assists: 1,010 (1.3 apg)
- Stats at NBA.com
- Stats at Basketball Reference

Michael Anthony Mitchell (January 1, 1956 – June 9, 2011) was an American professional basketball player in the National Basketball Association (NBA), over eleven seasons, from 1978 to 1990.

== College career ==
Mitchell, who was born in Atlanta, played college basketball at Auburn University. While at Auburn, Mitchell was a four-time All-SEC selection. He also became Auburn's all-time leader in scoring (2,123 points) and rebounding (996), after leaving for the NBA. He remains the all-time leading rebounder and is second in all-time scoring only to Chuck Person. Mitchell's number 30 jersey was retired on January 19, 2013, at the Auburn Arena.

== Professional career ==
Mitchell was drafted with the 15th pick in the first round, of the 1978 NBA draft, by the Cleveland Cavaliers. He started his NBA career with the Cavaliers but played most of his career for the San Antonio Spurs. Mitchell was a 6'7" and 234 lb. small forward, with career averages of 19.8 points per game, 5.6 rebounds per game, 1.3 assists per game, a .493 field goal percentage, and a .779 free throw percentage. He was known for his mid-range jumpshot and ability to play well under pressure in the postseason.

Mitchell was an All-Star in 1981 and was in the top ten in scoring four times, and the top ten in minutes played three times. During the 1983 NBA Playoffs, Mitchell and the Spurs reached the Western Conference Finals, where Mitchell led the Spurs in scoring with 25.7 points a game, while adding 10.3 rebounds a game, as the Spurs were eliminated by the Los Angeles Lakers in six games. Among other career highlights, he led the Spurs in scoring for the 1984–1985 season, which marked the only season in which George Gervin played on the Spurs and did not lead the team in scoring over an entire year. Mitchell averaged 22.2 points per game, to Gervin's 21.2 per game.

Mitchell averaged 19.8 points per game over the course of his NBA career. His 9,799 total points scored for the San Antonio Spurs is seventh highest in franchise history, behind Gervin, Tim Duncan, David Robinson, Tony Parker, James Silas, and Manu Ginóbili.

From 1988, until a short return to the Spurs during the 1990 playoffs, Mitchell played in Italy, with Basket Brescia. He also played in Italy with Basket Napoli, before leaving for the Israeli side Maccabi Tel Aviv, in 1991. From 1992, until his retirement in 1999, Mitchell played for another Italian club, Pallacanestro Reggiana.

== Post-playing career ==
Mitchell later worked as a counselor for at-risk youth, in San Antonio.

== Personal life and death ==
Mitchell died of cancer on June 9, 2011 after a long battle with cancer. He was survived by his wife Diana and his two children.

== NBA career statistics ==
Legend
GP	Games played	GS	Games started	MPG	Minutes per game
FG%	Field goal percentage	3P%	3-point field goal percentage	FT%	Free throw percentage
RPG	Rebounds per game	APG	Assists per game	SPG	Steals per game
BPG	Blocks per game	PPG	Points per game	**Bold**	Career high

=== Regular season ===
Year	Team	GP	GS	MPG	FG%	3P%	FT%	RPG	APG	SPG	BPG	PPG
1978–79	Cleveland	80	–	19.7	.513	–	.736	4.1	.8	.6	.4	10.7
1979–80	Cleveland	82	–	34.2	.523	.000	.787	7.2	1.1	.9	**.9**	22.2
1980–81	Cleveland	82	–	**39.0**	.476	.444	.784	6.1	1.7	.8	.6	**24.5**
1981–82	Cleveland	**27**	**26**	36.0	.454	.000	.720	5.2	1.4	**1.0**	.6	19.6
1981–82	San Antonio	**57**	**57**	36.7	**.539**	.000	.733	**7.9**	.8	.6	.5	21.0
1982–83	San Antonio	80	79	35.0	.511	.000	.758	6.7	1.2	.7	.7	19.9
1983–84	San Antonio	79	79	36.1	.488	.429	.779	7.2	1.2	.8	**.9**	23.3
1984–85	San Antonio	82	82	34.8	.497	.217	.777	5.1	1.8	.7	.3	22.2
1985–86	San Antonio	82	82	36.2	.473	.000	.809	5.0	**2.3**	.7	.3	23.4
1986–87	San Antonio	40	18	23.1	.435	**.500**	.821	2.6	1.0	.5	.2	12.7
1987–88	San Antonio	68	20	22.1	.482	.250	**.825**	2.9	1.0	.5	.2	13.5
Career		759	443	32.3	.493	.216	.779	5.6	1.3	.7	.5	19.8
All-Star		1	0	15.0	.500	–	1.000	4.0	2.0	1.0	.0	14.0

=== Playoffs ===
Year	Team	GP	GS	MPG	FG%	3P%	FT%	RPG	APG	SPG	BPG	PPG
1982	San Antonio	9	–	**40.6**	**.533**	–	.754	8.1	.8	.6	.1	**24.8**
1983	San Antonio	**11**	–	38.4	.510	**.500**	.758	**9.5**	1.1	.6	**1.7**	20.9
1985	San Antonio	5	5	36.0	**.564**	.000	**.875**	3.8	2.4	.6	.8	21.8
1986	San Antonio	3	3	35.7	.404	–	.500	3.0	**3.3**	**1.0**	1.0	15.7
1988	San Antonio	3	3	24.7	.351	–	.833	5.0	1.3	.3	.3	10.3
1990	San Antonio	4	0	3.8	.375	–	–	.8	.5	.0	.0	1.5
Career		35	11	33.2	.502	.333	.762	6.4	1.3	.5	.8	18.5
