= Johnny Moore (basketball) =

American basketball player (born 1958)

Personal information
- Born: March 3, 1958 (age 68) Altoona, Pennsylvania, U.S.
- Listed height: 6 ft 1 in (1.85 m)
- Listed weight: 175 lb (79 kg)

Career information
- High school: Altoona Area (Altoona, Pennsylvania)
- College: Texas (1975–1979)
- NBA draft: 1979: 2nd round, 43rd overall pick
- Drafted by: Seattle SuperSonics
- Playing career: 1980–1992
- Position: Point guard
- Number: 10, 00

Career history

Playing
- 1980–1987: San Antonio Spurs
- 1987: New Jersey Nets
- 1989: Tulsa Fast Breakers
- 1989–1990: San Antonio Spurs
- 1992: Girona

Career highlights
- NBA assists leader (1982); No. 00 retired by San Antonio Spurs; First-team All-SWC (1979)

Career NBA statistics
- Points: 4,890 (9.4 ppg)
- Rebounds: 1,548 (3.0 rpg)
- Assists: 3,866 (7.4 apg)
- Stats at NBA.com
- Stats at Basketball Reference

John Brian Moore (born March 3, 1958) is an American former professional basketball player in the National Basketball Association (NBA), primarily with the San Antonio Spurs. He played college basketball for the Texas Longhorns under head coaches Leon Black and Abe Lemons from 1975 to 1979. He spent his entire NBA career playing point guard for the Spurs, save for one game for the New Jersey Nets. A rare illness caused Moore to have his career put on hold in early 1986.

== College career ==
Moore started all 112 games of his four-year college career at the University of Texas at Austin. He finished his career as the Longhorns' all-time career assists leader, with 714, and remains second all-time in assists per game, averaging 6.38 assists over the course of his four years as their point guard. His per-game average of 8.34 assists as a senior remains a UT men's basketball record. Moore also posted a double-figure scoring average in each of his four seasons. He received first-team All-Southwest Conference (SWC) honors following his senior season.

As a junior, Moore helped guide the Abe Lemons-coached 1977–78 team to a 26–5 overall record (then tied with Jack Gray's 1947 Final Four team for the most wins in a single season in school history), a share of the Southwest Conference championship, and the 1978 National Invitation Tournament championship. The following season, Moore helped Texas win a share of the SWC championship for the second consecutive year, defeat a school-record three AP-ranked teams, advance to the 1979 NCAA tournament as a No. 4 seed, and finish the season with an overall record of 21–8, giving the Longhorns their first back-to-back seasons of 20 or more wins in 31 years.

== NBA career ==
Moore was selected by the Seattle SuperSonics in the second round of the 1979 NBA draft as the 43rd overall pick, then the second-highest NBA draft position for any basketball player in UT history.

Over 520 games in his NBA career, Moore averaged 9.4 points, 7.4 assists, 3.0 rebounds and 1.96 steals per game, and a field goal percentage of 46.0.

Moore recorded 20 assists during three games in his career, once during the playoffs, making him one of only seven players to record 20 assists or more in a playoff game. He also had two games of nine or more steals in a game, being one of only 50 different players to record nine or more steals in a game.

Moore is one of ten players to have his number ("00") retired by the Spurs.

== NBA career statistics ==
Legend
GP	Games played	GS	Games started	MPG	Minutes per game
FG%	Field goal percentage	3P%	3-point field goal percentage	FT%	Free throw percentage
RPG	Rebounds per game	APG	Assists per game	SPG	Steals per game
BPG	Blocks per game	PPG	Points per game	**Bold**	Career high
*	Led the league

=== Regular season ===
Year	Team	GP	GS	MPG	FG%	3P%	FT%	RPG	APG	SPG	BPG	PPG
1980–81	San Antonio	**82**	—	19.2	.479	.053	.610	2.4	4.5	1.5	.3	7.4
1981–82	San Antonio	79	78	29.0	.463	.048	.670	3.5	9.6*	2.1	.2	9.4
1982–83	San Antonio	77	73	**33.1**	.468	.227	.744	3.6	9.8	2.5	**.4**	12.2
1983–84	San Antonio	59	42	28.0	.446	**.322**	.755	3.0	9.6	2.1	.3	10.1
1984–85	San Antonio	**82**	**82**	32.8	.457	.281	.762	**4.6**	**10.0**	**2.8**	.2	12.8
1985–86	San Antonio	28	23	30.6	**.495**	.182	.686	3.1	9.0	2.5	.2	**13.0**
1986–87	San Antonio	55	27	22.4	.442	.278	**.800**	1.8	4.5	1.5	.1	8.6
1987–88	San Antonio	4	0	12.8	.444	.000	—	1.0	2.8	.8	.0	2.0
1987–88	New Jersey	1	0	10.0	.000	—	—	2.0	1.0	.0	.0	.0
1989–90	San Antonio	53	8	9.7	.373	.235	.593	1.0	1.5	.6	.1	2.2
Career		520	333	25.8	.460	.251	.712	3.0	7.4	2.0	.2	9.4

=== Playoffs ===
Year	Team	GP	GS	MPG	FG%	3P%	FT%	RPG	APG	SPG	BPG	PPG
1981	San Antonio	7	—	17.7	.486	.000	.750	1.9	3.9	1.4	.1	6.0
1982	San Antonio	9	—	32.4	.476	.000	.593	3.4	**10.3***	1.7	**0.7**	10.4
1983	San Antonio	**11**	—	**37.6**	**.533**	**.529***	**.800**	4.3	**14.6***	**2.5***	.3	**22.5**
1985	San Antonio	5	**5**	33.6	.463	.333	.652	**6.0**	8.4	2.0	.4	13.2
1990	San Antonio	9	0	9.6	.250	.000	.500	1.2	2.3	.8	.1	1.8
Career		41	5	26.4	.490	.313	.683	3.2	8.4	1.7	.3	11.3

== Coaching career ==
Moore made his coaching debut in the 2010–11 season with the Austin Toros of the NBA D-League as an assistant coach.

In December 2012 Moore was named head coach of the Corpus Christi Clutch of the American Basketball League. 10 of 12 teams did not survive the first ABL season of 2013, including the Clutch.

In the Fall of 2013 Moore was named head coach the South Texas Stingrays, an expansion team in the ABA. Team majority owner Marlon Minifee (who also owns the Texas Fuel) decided not to bring back the Stingrays to Brownsville for 2014–15, opting to form a new team: Central Texas Swarm (now known as the Am-Mex Swarm). Moore is currently head coach of the Swarm.

== See also ==
- List of National Basketball Association players with most steals in a game
