= Gene Banks =

American basketball player and coach (born 1959)

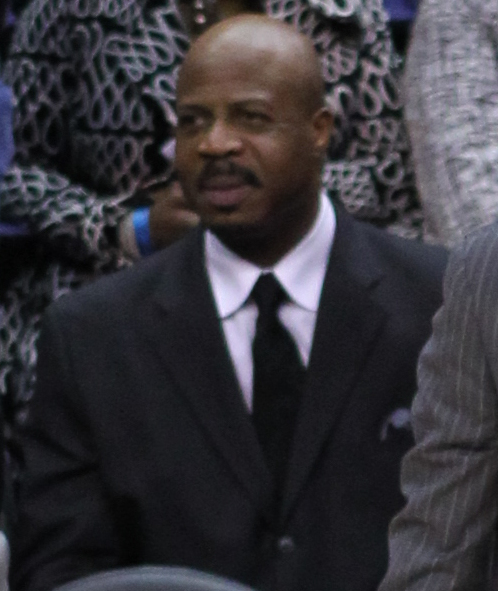
- Banks as an assistant coach with the Washington Wizards in 2012

Personal information
- Born: May 15, 1959 (age 67) Philadelphia, Pennsylvania, U.S.
- Listed height: 6 ft 7 in (2.01 m)
- Listed weight: 215 lb (98 kg)

Career information
- High school: West Philadelphia (Philadelphia, Pennsylvania)
- College: Duke (1977–1981)
- NBA draft: 1981: 2nd round, 28th overall pick
- Drafted by: San Antonio Spurs
- Playing career: 1981–1993
- Position: Shooting guard / small forward
- Number: 20
- Coaching career: 2009–present

Career history

Playing
- 1981–1985: San Antonio Spurs
- 1985–1987: Chicago Bulls
- 1988–1989: Arimo Bologna
- 1989–1990: La Crosse Catbirds
- 1990–1992: Maccabi Rishon Lezion
- 1992–1993: Hapoel Herzliya

Coaching
- 2009–2012: Washington Wizards (assistant)

Career highlights
- Third-team All-American – NABC (1981); Third-team All-American – UPI (1979); First-team All-ACC (1981); 3× Second-team All-ACC (1978–1980); ACC Rookie of the Year (1978); 2× First-team Parade All-American (1976, 1977); McDonald's All-American Game MVP (1977)

Career NBA statistics
- Points: 5,305 (11.3 ppg)
- Rebounds: 2,718 (5.8 rpg)
- Assists: 1,335 (2.9 apg)
- Stats at NBA.com
- Stats at Basketball Reference

Eugene Lavon Banks (born May 15, 1959) is an American former professional basketball player and coach. He was born and raised in Philadelphia.

== Early life and education ==
Banks was born in Philadelphia. He attended West Philadelphia High School, where he was a 6'7" forward. Nicknamed "Tinkerbell," Banks was named to high school All-American teams his last three years of high school. By his senior year, he was considered one of the best players in the country, along with Albert King and Magic Johnson. Banks was voted MVP of the 1977 Dapper Dan and named to the inaugural McDonald's All-American team, which played in the 1977 Capital Classic; he was also voted its MVP.

Banks' attended Duke University, where he played for college basketball for the Duke Blue Devils. He also was heavily recruited by other NCAA Division I college basketball programs, including UCLA and Villanova. Banks has said that a high school teacher had repeatedly emphasized Duke's academic opportunities, which prompted him to participate in a recruiting visit to the school.

=== College basketball career ===
At Duke, Banks started as a freshman alongside such players as Mike Gminski, Jim Spanarkel, and Kenny Dennard. After finishing last in the conference the prior year, the Blue Devils were ranked in the top 10 by the end of the regular season. Qualifying for the NCAA tournament for the first time in a dozen years, the Blue Devils reached the championship game in 1978, losing to Kentucky, 94–88. During that rookie season, Banks became the first Duke freshman to record a triple double and was named the Atlantic Coast Conference (ACC) Rookie of the Year.

Banks' teams never again made it to the Final Four, though they did qualify for the NCAA tournament during two of the next three years. The team's overall record during his 4 years was 90–37. During the course of his 4-year Duke career, Banks averaged 16.8 points, 7.9 rebounds, and shot 53% from the field. During those final three seasons, Banks was named team MVP each year.

During his senior season, playing for Mike Krzyzewski, Banks won the ACC scoring title over such players as James Worthy and Ralph Sampson. He was named to All American teams after two of his seasons.

Banks is widely seen as a crucial recruit as Duke slowly transitioned into the world of integrated college basketball. While the sixth African American player in Duke's history, he was the school's first Black All American, setting the stage for Coach Krzyzewski's later recruiting success.

Banks received his BA in English from Duke in May 1981, where he was one of the two graduation speakers selected from the student body.

== Professional basketball ==
Banks played six seasons and 468 games in the National Basketball Association. Competing for the San Antonio Spurs and the Chicago Bulls, he averaged 11.3 points per game. His career high of 44 points was achieved against the Los Angeles Lakers in 1983. He recorded his first NBA triple-double with the Chicago Bulls.

In the 1988–89 season, Banks played in Italy for Arimo Bologna. He went from Italy to continue his career as a member of the Maccabi Rishon Lezion basketball club in Israel. In 1993, he continued his play in Israel as a member of Hapoel Herzliya and took them to the Israeli Cup Championship game.

Between these stints, Banks played the 1989–90 season with the La Crosse Catbirds of the Continental Basketball Association (CBA), averaging 15.3 points in 40 games. The Catbirds would go on to win the CBA title that year.

=== Coaching ===
In 2009, Gene Banks became an assistant coach with the Washington Wizards. In 2012, Banks was reassigned from assistant coach with the Wizards to scout of the southern region of the eastern Atlantic Coast. He is credited with the development of such players as JaVale McGee, Andray Blatche, and Kevin Seraphin.

== Honors ==
Banks was inducted into the Duke Basketball Hall of Fame in 1994, and the Duke Hall of Honors in 1996.

In 2007, Banks was named the "best foreign player" to ever play for Maccabi Rishon LeZion.

== NBA career statistics ==
=== Regular season ===
Year	Team	GP	GS	MPG	FG%	3P%	FT%	RPG	APG	SPG	BPG	PPG
1981–82	San Antonio	80	4	21.3	.477	.000	.684	5.1	1.8	.7	.2	9.6
1982–83	San Antonio	81	81	33.6	.550	.000	.705	7.6	3.4	1.0	.3	14.9
1983–84	San Antonio	80	66	32.5	.568	.167	.741	7.3	3.2	1.3	.3	13.1
1984–85	San Antonio	82	41	25.5	.586	.333	.774	5.4	2.9	.8	.2	9.5
1985–86	Chicago	82	33	26.1	.517	.000	.718	4.4	3.1	1.0	.1	10.9
1986–87	Chicago	63	39	28.9	.539	.000	.767	4.9	2.7	.8	.3	9.7
Career		468	264	27.9	.539	.043	.730	5.8	2.9	.9	.2	11.3

=== Playoffs ===
Year	Team	GP	GS	MPG	FG%	3P%	FT%	RPG	APG	SPG	BPG	PPG
1982	San Antonio	9	–	16.2	.462	.000	.400	4.8	1.0	.4	.3	7.1
1983	San Antonio	11	–	36.2	.507	–	.657	6.9	4.5	1.0	.1	15.9
1985	San Antonio	1	0	10.0	.000	–	–	.0	1.0	.0	.0	.0
1986	Chicago	3	0	23.0	.556	.000	.500	3.3	1.7	.3	.0	7.3
1987	Chicago	3	3	26.3	.591	–	.625	2.7	.7	.0	.0	10.3
Career		27	3	26.0	.504	.000	.596	5.1	2.5	.6	.1	10.8

== See also ==
- List of NBA career field goal percentage leaders
