= Voegele =

Voegele is the name of:

- Kate Voegele (born 1986), American singer-songwriter and actress
- Ralf T. Voegele (born 1963), German biologist at the University of Hohenheim
- Ferdinand Voegele (born February 12, 1896), German cryptanalyst responsible for Luftwaffe Signal Intelligence Service during World War II.

== See also ==
- Vögele
