= Billy McKinney (basketball) =

American basketball player and broadcaster

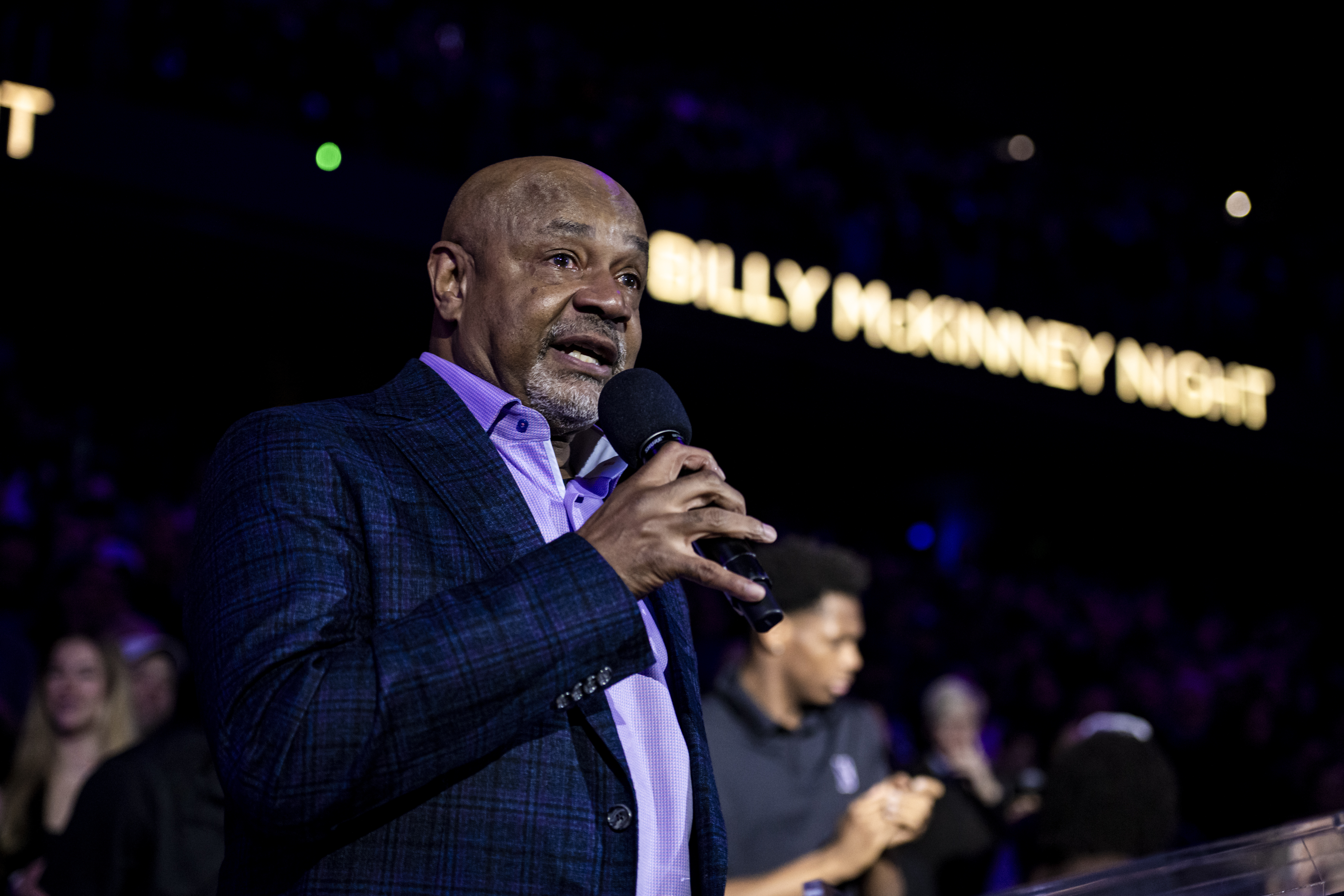
- Billy McKinney speaks at his number retirement night during the Northwestern vs. Iowa men's basketball game

Personal information
- Born: June 5, 1955 (age 71) Waukegan, Illinois, U.S.
- Listed height: 6 ft 0 in (1.83 m)
- Listed weight: 160 lb (73 kg)

Career information
- High school: Zion-Benton (Zion, Illinois)
- College: Northwestern (1973–1977)
- NBA draft: 1977: 6th round, 115th overall pick
- Drafted by: Phoenix Suns
- Playing career: 1978–1985
- Position: Point guard
- Number: 25, 7, 1

Career history
- 1978–1980: Kansas City Kings
- 1980: Utah Jazz
- 1980–1983: Denver Nuggets
- 1983–1984: San Diego Clippers
- 1985: Chicago Bulls

Career highlights
- First-team All-Big Ten (1977)

Career NBA statistics
- Points: 3,823 (8.0 ppg)
- Rebounds: 677 (1.4 rpg)
- Assists: 1,661 (3.5 apg)
- Stats at NBA.com
- Stats at Basketball Reference

William Mervin McKinney III (born June 5, 1955) is an American former professional basketball player, former radio broadcaster, and the current mayor of Zion, Illinois. Due to his quickness he was nicknamed "The Crazed Hummingbird".

A 6'0" guard, McKinney attended Zion-Benton High School where he played for Mo Tharp (long time Fremd coach), and Northwestern University; he earned a degree in education. He was the Wildcats' all-time leading scorer for 35 years until John Shurna surpassed him in February 2012. From 1978 to 1986 McKinney played in the National Basketball Association as a member of the Kansas City Kings, Utah Jazz, Denver Nuggets, San Diego Clippers, and Chicago Bulls. He averaged 8.0 points per game and 3.5 assists per game in his NBA career.

McKinney later served as Assistant Vice President of Basketball Operations for the Bulls, Director of Player Personnel for the Minnesota Timberwolves, Vice President of Basketball Operations (Detroit Pistons), and Executive Vice President of the NBA's Seattle SuperSonics and the same position for the WNBA's Seattle Storm. In his previous position he was the radio color analyst for the NBA's Minnesota Timberwolves. In June 2008, McKinney was hired by fellow Zion-Benton alumnus John Hammond as the Milwaukee Bucks' Director of Scouting. In 2015, he was named vice-president of Scouting.

McKinney was elected as Zion's mayor in April 2019.

On Saturday, March 2, 2024, McKinney's number 30 was retired by Northwestern University.

== Career statistics ==
Legend
GP	Games played	GS	Games started	MPG	Minutes per game
FG%	Field goal percentage	3P%	3-point field goal percentage	FT%	Free throw percentage
RPG	Rebounds per game	APG	Assists per game	SPG	Steals per game
BPG	Blocks per game	PPG	Points per game	**Bold**	Career high

=== NBA ===
==== Regular season ====
Year	Team	GP	GS	MPG	FG%	3P%	FT%	RPG	APG	SPG	BPG	PPG
1978–79	Kansas City	78		15.9	.503		.796	1.1	3.2	.7	.0	7.8
1979–80	Kansas City	76		17.5	.449	.100	.805	1.1	3.3	.8	.1	6.8
1980–81	Utah	**35***		**29.5**	**.532**	**.500**	.917	2.1	**4.5**	1.1	.1	8.4
1980–81	Denver	**49***		23.1	.493	.100	.843	**2.2**	4.1	**1.2**	.1	10.7
1981–82	Denver	81	27	24.2	.528	.000	.806	1.8	4.2	.9	**.2**	**10.8**
1982–83	Denver	68	**38**	22.9	.487	.000	.814	1.8	4.2	.6	.1	9.8
1983–84	San Diego	80	0	10.5	.446	.000	.848	.7	2.0	.3	.0	3.9
1985–86	Chicago	9	0	9.2	.435	–	**1.000**	.6	1.4	.3	.0	2.4
Career		476	65	19.3	.493	.063	.820	1.4	3.5	.7	.1	8.0

==== Playoffs ====
Year	Team	GP	MPG	FG%	3P%	FT%	RPG	APG	SPG	BPG	PPG
1979	Kansas City	5	19.2	.375		**.857**	1.4	**4.8**	**1.0**	.0	7.2
1980	Kansas City	3	11.3	.400	.000	–	1.0	2.7	.0	.0	1.3
1982	Denver	3	**30.3**	**.593**	.000	.833	**2.0**	3.3	**1.0**	.0	**14.0**
1983	Denver	**8**	14.1	.565	–	.556	1.6	2.3	.3	.0	7.8
Career		19	17.6	.500	.500	.703	1.5	3.2	.5	.0	7.6

== Electoral history ==
2019 Zion, Illinois mayoral election
Candidate	Votes	%
Billy McKinney	1,281	63.10%
Ron Molinaro	749	36.90%
Total votes	2,030	100.00%

2023 Zion, Illinois mayoral election
Candidate	Votes	%
Billy McKinney (incumbent)	1,017	83.22%
Tracey Johnson (write-in)	194	15.88%
Shawn T. White (write-in)	11	0.90%
Total votes	1,222	100.00%
