= Dave Corzine =

American basketball player

Personal information
- Born: April 25, 1956 (age 70) Arlington Heights, Illinois, U.S.
- Listed height: 6 ft 11 in (2.11 m)
- Listed weight: 250 lb (113 kg)

Career information
- High school: John Hersey (Arlington Heights, Illinois)
- College: DePaul (1974–1978)
- NBA draft: 1978: 1st round, 18th overall pick
- Drafted by: Washington Bullets
- Playing career: 1978–1992
- Position: Center
- Number: 40, 42

Career history

Playing
- 1978–1980: Washington Bullets
- 1980–1982: San Antonio Spurs
- 1982–1989: Chicago Bulls
- 1989–1990: Orlando Magic
- 1990–1991: Seattle SuperSonics
- 1991–1992: Filanto Forlì

Coaching
- 1995–1996: Chicago Rockers

Career highlights
- Second-team All-American – AP, NABC (1978); Third-team All-American – UPI (1978); No. 40 retired by DePaul Blue Demons (2025)

Career NBA statistics
- Points: 7,615 (8.5 ppg)
- Rebounds: 5,262 (5.9 rpg)
- Assists: 1,477 (1.7 apg)
- Stats at NBA.com
- Stats at Basketball Reference

David John Corzine (born April 25, 1956) is an American former professional basketball player in the National Basketball Association (NBA).

== Biography ==
A Chicago-area native who went to John Hersey High School in Arlington Heights, Illinois and DePaul University in Chicago, Corzine was the 18th overall pick of the 1978 NBA draft by the Washington Bullets. With the Bullets, Corzine participated in the 1979 NBA Finals but they lost in five games to the Seattle SuperSonics. After two years with the Bullets and two more with the San Antonio Spurs, Corzine returned to his hometown to play for the Chicago Bulls for seven seasons, where he started in 285 out of 556 games played for the team.

He was then traded to the Orlando Magic for two second-round picks (which the Chicago Bulls used to select Toni Kukoč and P.J. Brown, respectively) on June 27, 1989. He began the 1989–90 season as the inaugural Orlando Magic's first starting center, but in the first quarter of the third game of the season against the Cleveland Cavaliers (won by the Magic in overtime) he sustained serious ligament damage in his left knee, and was subsequently forced to miss a lot of time. He returned to play a few minutes in three late-December games the same year, but hurt the knee again, and never suited up for the team after that. After the season, he signed with the Seattle SuperSonics as a free agent on October 4, 1990. At the time of his signing, his attorney, Herb Rudoy allegedly said: "Dave is excited, but he's going to get into it slowly. He's looking to play four or five more years in this league." As it turned out, that season was the last of his NBA career.

He averaged 8.5 points, 5.9 rebounds, 0.4 steals, and 1.0 blocks per game in the NBA. His best season was arguably with the Chicago Bulls in 1982–83 when he averaged 14.0 points and 8.7 rebounds per game, or the 1983–84 NBA season, when he played and started all 82 games and had career-highs in steals, assists, blocks, FT%, and 3-PT%.

On November 19, 2024, the DePaul Blue Demons men's basketball team announced during a game against Eastern Illinois that Corzine's No. 40 jersey would be retired by the program. Corzine played center for DePaul from 1974 to 1978 where he continues to hold the record for the most rebounds in program history (1,151) and is fourth in career points (1,896). His star show is considered to be his participation in the 1978 NCAA Tournament where he scored 46 points against Louisville in the Sweet 16. He would be named an Honorable Mention All-American that same year. He was inducted into the DePaul Hall of fame in 1994. The ceremony took place on February 22, 2025, at halftime during a game against Butler.

== NBA career statistics ==
Legend
GP	Games played	GS	Games started	MPG	Minutes per game
FG%	Field goal percentage	3P%	3-point field goal percentage	FT%	Free throw percentage
RPG	Rebounds per game	APG	Assists per game	SPG	Steals per game
BPG	Blocks per game	PPG	Points per game	**Bold**	Career high

=== Regular season ===
Year	Team	GP	GS	MPG	FG%	3P%	FT%	RPG	APG	SPG	BPG	PPG
1978–79	Washington	59	–	9.0	**.534**	–	.778	2.5	0.8	0.2	0.2	3.0
1979–80	Washington	78	–	10.6	.417	–	.662	3.5	0.8	0.1	0.4	2.9
1980–81	San Antonio	**82**	–	23.9	.490	.000	.714	7.8	1.4	0.5	1.2	10.5
1981–82	San Antonio	**82**	21	26.7	.519	.250	.746	7.7	1.6	0.4	**1.5**	10.1
1982–83	Chicago	**82**	71	30.4	.497	.000	.720	**8.7**	1.9	0.6	1.3	**14.0**
1983–84	Chicago	**82**	**82**	**32.6**	.467	**.333**	**.840**	7.0	**2.5**	**0.7**	**1.5**	12.2
1984–85	Chicago	**82**	50	25.1	.486	.000	.745	5.1	1.7	0.4	0.8	8.5
1985–86	Chicago	67	4	25.5	.491	.250	.743	6.5	2.2	0.4	0.8	9.6
1986–87	Chicago	**82**	39	27.9	.475	.000	.736	6.6	**2.5**	0.5	1.1	8.3
1987–88	Chicago	80	32	29.1	.481	.111	.752	6.6	1.9	0.5	1.2	10.1
1988–89	Chicago	81	7	18.3	.461	.250	.740	3.9	1.3	0.4	0.6	5.9
1989–90	Orlando	6	3	13.2	.379	–	.000	3.0	0.3	0.3	0.0	3.7
1990–91	Seattle	28	0	5.3	.447	–	.591	1.2	0.1	0.2	0.2	1.7
Career		891	309	23.3	.484	.189	.747	5.9	1.7	0.4	1.0	8.5

=== Playoffs ===
Year	Team	GP	GS	MPG	FG%	3P%	FT%	RPG	APG	SPG	BPG	PPG
1979	Washington	12	–	5.3	.267	–	–	2.1	0.4	0.2	0.0	0.7
1980	Washington	2	–	4.5	**.800**	–	**1.000**	1.5	0.0	0.0	0.0	5.0
1981	San Antonio	7	–	23.0	.491	–	.692	6.9	**2.3**	0.6	**1.1**	9.0
1982	San Antonio	9	–	28.7	.462	–	.706	**9.4**	1.9	**0.7**	1.0	**13.6**
1985	Chicago	4	4	19.3	.667	–	.833	5.5	0.8	0.5	0.3	8.3
1986	Chicago	3	3	34.3	.552	–	**1.000**	9.0	2.0	0.3	0.7	12.0
1987	Chicago	3	3	**40.7**	.455	–	.778	7.0	2.3	0.3	1.0	9.0
1988	Chicago	10	**10**	30.8	.355	–	.538	5.7	0.8	0.3	0.8	6.1
1989	Chicago	**16**	0	13.7	.422	–	.647	2.6	0.6	0.3	0.4	4.1
1991	Seattle	2	0	6.0	.667	–	**1.000**	0.5	0.0	0.0	0.0	2.5
Career		68	20	19.6	.455	–	.707	4.9	1.0	0.3	0.5	6.3
