= 1981–82 San Antonio Spurs season =

- Division champions
- Head coach: Stan Albeck
- General manager: Bob Bass
- Owner: Angelo Drossos
- Arena: HemisFair Arena

Results
- Record: 48–34 (.585)
- Place: Division: 1st (Midwest); Conference: 2nd (Western)
- Playoff finish: Conference finals (lost to Lakers 0–4)
- Stats at Basketball Reference

Local media
- Television: KMOL
- Radio: KCTI

The 1981–82 San Antonio Spurs season was the Spurs' sixth season in the NBA and 15th season as a franchise. George Gervin was the winner of a fourth scoring title in five years with 32.3 points per game. The Spurs won their second straight division title with a record of 48–34. In the playoffs the Spurs beat the Seattle SuperSonics in 5 games. In the Western Finals, the Spurs would be swept in 4 straight by the Los Angeles Lakers. The Spurs had the third best team offensive rating in the NBA.

== Draft picks ==
Round	Pick	Player	Position	Nationality	College
2	28	Gene Banks	SG/SF	United States	Duke
2	30	Ed Rains		United States	South Alabama
3	64	Tom Baker		United States	Eastern Kentucky
4	87	Earl Belcher	F	United States	St. Bonaventure
5	110	Mike Rhodes		United States	Vanderbilt
6	133	Norman Shavers		United States	Jackson State
7	156	Mark Minderman		United States	Northern Michigan
8	178	Bob Bartholomew		United States	San Diego
9	199	Leonel Marquetti		United States	Hampton
10	219	Alvin Brooks		United States	Lamar

== Roster ==
1981–82 San Antonio Spurs roster
Players

Pos.	No.	Player	Height	Weight	DOB	From
F	20	Gene Banks	6 ft 7 in (2.01 m)	215 lb (98 kg)	1959-05-15	Duke
G	23	Mike Bratz	6 ft 2 in (1.88 m)	185 lb (84 kg)	1955-10-17	Stanford
C	40	Dave Corzine	6 ft 11 in (2.11 m)	250 lb (113 kg)	1956-04-25	DePaul
G	44	George Gervin	6 ft 7 in (2.01 m)	180 lb (82 kg)	1952-04-27	Eastern Michigan
F	30	Paul Griffin	6 ft 9 in (2.06 m)	205 lb (93 kg)	1954-01-20	Western Michigan
C	52	George Johnson	6 ft 11 in (2.11 m)	205 lb (93 kg)	1948-12-18	Dillard
F	24	John Lambert	6 ft 10 in (2.08 m)	225 lb (102 kg)	1953-01-14	USC
F	34	Mike Mitchell	6 ft 7 in (2.01 m)	215 lb (98 kg)	1956-01-01	Auburn
G	00	Johnny Moore	6 ft 1 in (1.85 m)	175 lb (79 kg)	1958-03-03	Texas
F	53	Mark Olberding	6 ft 8 in (2.03 m)	225 lb (102 kg)	1956-04-21	Minnesota
G	21	Roger Phegley	6 ft 6 in (1.98 m)	205 lb (93 kg)	1956-10-16	Bradley
F	15	Ed Rains	6 ft 7 in (2.01 m)	190 lb (86 kg)	1956-12-24	North Alabama
F	43	Rich Yonakor	6 ft 9 in (2.06 m)	220 lb (100 kg)	1958-10-03	North Carolina

Coaches
Head coach
- Stan Albeck
Assistant(s)
- Morris McHone

Legend
- (DP) Unsigned draft pick
- (FA) Free agent
- (S) Suspended
- Injured

Roster
Updated: March 29, 1982

== Regular season ==
=== Season standings ===
Midwest Division	W	L	PCT	GB	Home	Road	Div
y-San Antonio Spurs	48	34	.585	–	29–12	19–22	20–10
x-Denver Nuggets	46	36	.561	2.0	29–12	17–24	19–11
x-Houston Rockets	46	36	.561	2.0	25–16	21–20	17–13
Kansas City Kings	30	52	.366	18.0	23–18	7–34	11–19
Dallas Mavericks	28	54	.341	20.0	16–25	12–29	11–19
Utah Jazz	25	57	.305	23.0	18–23	7–34	9–21

#	Western Conference				
#	Team	W	L	PCT	GB
1	c-Los Angeles Lakers	57	25	.695	–
2	y-San Antonio Spurs	48	34	.585	9
3	x-Seattle SuperSonics	52	30	.634	5
4	x-Denver Nuggets	46	36	.561	11
5	x-Phoenix Suns	46	36	.561	11
6	x-Houston Rockets	46	36	.561	11
7	Golden State Warriors	45	37	.549	12
8	Portland Trail Blazers	42	40	.512	15
9	Kansas City Kings	30	52	.366	27
10	Dallas Mavericks	28	54	.341	29
11	Utah Jazz	25	57	.305	32
12	San Diego Clippers	17	65	.207	40

== Game log ==
=== Regular season ===
1981–82 game log
Total: 48–34 (home: 29–12; road: 19–22)
October: 2–0 (home: 1–0; road: 1–0)

Game	Date	Team	Score	High points	High rebounds	High assists	Location Attendance	Record
1	October 30	@ Kansas City	W 113–102				Kemper Arena	1–0
2	October 31	Denver	W 145–120				HemisFair Arena	2–0

November: 8–5 (home: 5–1; road: 3–4)

Game	Date	Team	Score	High points	High rebounds	High assists	Location Attendance	Record
3	November 3	@ Phoenix	L 88–111				Arizona Veterans Memorial Coliseum	2–1
4	November 4	Cleveland	W 128–102				HemisFair Arena	3–1
5	November 7	New York	W 103–96				HemisFair Arena	4–1
6	November 10	Los Angeles	W 128–102				HemisFair Arena	5–1
7	November 13	@ Seattle	W 119–112				Kingdome	6–1
8	November 15	@ Portland	W 110–105				Memorial Coliseum	7–1
9	November 17	@ Dallas	W 112–105				Reunion Arena	8–1
10	November 18	Seattle	W 111–93				HemisFair Arena	9–1
11	November 20	@ Los Angeles	L 116–136				The Forum	9–2
12	November 21	@ Golden State	L 122–129				Oakland–Alameda County Coliseum Arena	9–3
13	November 25	Los Angeles	L 96–117				HemisFair Arena	9–4
14	November 27	New Jersey	W 114–86				HemisFair Arena	10–4
15	November 29	@ Milwaukee	L 89–105				MECCA Arena	10–5

December: 9–4 (home: 5–2; road: 4–2)

Game	Date	Team	Score	High points	High rebounds	High assists	Location Attendance	Record
16	December 1	@ Washington	W 110–99				Capital Centre	11–5
17	December 2	@ Philadelphia	W 106–101				The Spectrum	12–5
18	December 4	Portland	W 127–111				HemisFair Arena	13–5
19	December 9	Seattle	W 110–99				HemisFair Arena	14–5
20	December 11	@ Dallas	W 101–99				Reunion Arena	15–5
21	December 12	Utah	W 111–97				HemisFair Arena	16–5
22	December 15	@ Utah	L 103–108				Salt Palace Acord Arena	16–6
23	December 18	Phoenix	L 104–108				HemisFair Arena	16–7
24	December 19	@ Denver	L 125–138				McNichols Sports Arena	16–8
25	December 23	@ San Diego	W 114–109				San Diego Sports Arena	17–8
26	December 26	Atlanta	L 97–105				HemisFair Arena	17–9
27	December 29	San Diego	W 119–107				HemisFair Arena	18–9
28	December 30	Houston	W 109–104				HemisFair Arena	19–9

January: 9–5 (home: 7–1; road: 2–4)

Game	Date	Team	Score	High points	High rebounds	High assists	Location Attendance	Record
29	January 2	Denver	W 148–133				HemisFair Arena	20–9
30	January 5	@ Portland	L 110–115				Memorial Coliseum	20–10
31	January 6	@ Utah	L 115–130				Salt Palace Acord Arena	20–11
32	January 7	@ Golden State	W 123–112				Oakland–Alameda County Coliseum Arena	21–11
33	January 9	Kansas City	W 113–100				HemisFair Arena	22–11
34	January 12	Dallas	W 127–109				HemisFair Arena	23–11
35	January 15	Houston	W 128–90				HemisFair Arena	24–11
36	January 16	@ Houston	L 99–116				The Summit	24–12
37	January 19	@ Phoenix	L 96–108				Arizona Veterans Memorial Coliseum	24–13
38	January 21	Utah	W 123–104				HemisFair Arena	25–13
39	January 22	@ Atlanta	W 115–107				The Omni	26–13
40	January 23	Indiana	L 98–107				HemisFair Arena	26–14
41	January 26	Philadelphia	W 103–95				HemisFair Arena	27–14
42	January 28	Kansas City	W 126–115				HemisFair Arena	28–14

February: 8–6 (home: 5–2; road: 3–4)

Game	Date	Team	Score	High points	High rebounds	High assists	Location Attendance	Record
43	February 2	Dallas	W 103–98				HemisFair Arena	28–15
44	February 4	Phoenix	W 118–112				HemisFair Arena	29–15
45	February 5	@ Kansas City	L 102–109				Kemper Arena	30–15
46	February 7	@ Golden State	L 111–116				Oakland–Alameda County Coliseum Arena	30–16
47	February 9	Washington	L 110–112				HemisFair Arena	30–17
48	February 12	@ Los Angeles	W 100–94				The Forum	31–17
49	February 14	Seattle	W 114–94				HemisFair Arena	32–17
50	February 17	Detroit	W 126–112				HemisFair Arena	33–17
51	February 19	@ Denver	W 126–121				McNichols Sports Arena	34–17
52	February 20	San Diego	L 101–118				HemisFair Arena	34–18
53	February 23	Golden State	W 143–123				HemisFair Arena	35–18
54	February 25	@ Detroit	W 119–116				Pontiac Silverdome	36–18
55	February 26	@ Indiana	L 100–108				Market Square Arena	36–19
56	February 28	@ Chicago	L 104–118				Chicago Stadium	36–20

March: 8–8 (home: 4–4; road: 4–4)

Game	Date	Team	Score	High points	High rebounds	High assists	Location Attendance	Record
57	March 2	@ Houston	W 119–117				The Summit	37–20
58	March 4	Boston	L 101–110				HemisFair Arena	37–21
59	March 6	Milwaukee	W 171–166 (3OT)				HemisFair Arena	38–21
60	March 8	Dallas	L 113–121				HemisFair Arena	38–22
61	March 9	@ San Diego	L 127–138				San Diego Sports Arena	38–23
62	March 12	Portland	L 108–112				HemisFair Arena	38–24
63	March 14	Chicago	W 119–117				HemisFair Arena	39–24
64	March 16	@ New York	W 114–91				Madison Square Garden	40–24
65	March 17	@ New Jersey	L 90–93				Brendan Byrne Arena	40–25
66	March 19	@ Boston	L 110–134				Boston Garden	40–26
67	March 20	@ Cleveland	W 115–102				Richfield Coliseum	41–26
68	March 23	San Diego	W 106–98				HemisFair Arena	42–26
69	March 24	@ Denver	L 115–129				McNichols Sports Arena	42–27
70	March 26	Los Angeles	W 110–105				HemisFair Arena	43–27
71	March 27	@ Utah	W 114–110				Salt Palace Acord Arena	44–27
72	March 30	Golden State	L 107–113				HemisFair Arena	44–28

April: 4–6 (home: 2–2; road: 2–4)

Game	Date	Team	Score	High points	High rebounds	High assists	Location Attendance	Record
73	April 1	@ Portland	L 105–109				Memorial Coliseum	44–29
74	April 2	@ Seattle	L 86–111				Kingdome	44–30
75	April 4	Houston	L 93–95				HemisFair Arena	44–31
76	April 7	Kansas City	W 118–113				HemisFair Arena	45–31
77	April 10	@ Houston	L 100–105				The Summit	45–32
78	April 11	@ Kansas City	W 126–121				Kemper Arena	46–32
79	April 13	Denver	W 144–137				HemisFair Arena	47–32
80	April 14	@ Phoenix	L 92–104				Arizona Veterans Memorial Coliseum	47–33
81	April 16	@ Dallas	W 118–106				Reunion Arena	48–33
82	April 18	Utah	L 120–128				HemisFair Arena	48–34

1981–82 schedule

=== Playoffs ===
1982 playoff game log
Conference semifinals: 4–1 (home: 2–0; road: 2–1)

Game	Date	Team	Score	High points	High rebounds	High assists	Location Attendance	Series
1	April 27	@ Seattle	W 95–93	George Gervin (31)	Mike Mitchell (11)	Johnny Moore (8)	Kingdome; 14,457	1–0
2	April 28	@ Seattle	L 99–114	George Gervin (24)	Johnson, Corzine (8)	Johnny Moore (14)	Kingdome; 19,403	1–1
3	April 30	Seattle	W 99–97	George Gervin (36)	Mike Mitchell (12)	Johnny Moore (12)	HemisFair Arena; 14,019	2–1
4	May 2	Seattle	W 115–113	Mike Mitchell (22)	Olberding, Banks (9)	Mike Bratz (10)	HemisFair Arena; 15,002	3–1
5	May 5	@ Seattle	W 109–103	George Gervin (26)	Dave Corzine (11)	Moore, Bratz (9)	Kingdome; 23,180	4–1

Conference finals: 0–4 (home: 0–2; road: 0–2)

Game	Date	Team	Score	High points	High rebounds	High assists	Location Attendance	Series
1	May 9	@ Los Angeles	L 117–128	George Gervin (34)	Dave Corzine (11)	Johnny Moore (12)	The Forum; 15,700	0–1
2	May 11	@ Los Angeles	L 101–110	Mike Mitchell (34)	Dave Corzine (13)	Johnny Moore (11)	The Forum; 17,505	0–2
3	May 14	Los Angeles	L 108–118	George Gervin (39)	George Gervin (15)	Johnny Moore (12)	HemisFair Arena; 15,800	0–3
4	May 15	Los Angeles	L 123–128	George Gervin (38)	Mike Mitchell (10)	Johnny Moore (10)	HemisFair Arena; 15,800	0–4

1982 schedule

== Player statistics ==
=== Ragular season ===
Player	POS	GP	GS	MP	REB	AST	STL	BLK	PTS	MPG	RPG	APG	SPG	BPG	PPG
Dave Corzine	C	82	21	2,189	629	130	33	126	832	26.7	7.7	1.6	.4	1.5	10.1
Mike Bratz	PG	81	3	1,616	166	438	65	11	625	20.0	2.0	5.4	.8	.1	7.7
Gene Banks	SF	80	4	1,700	411	147	55	17	767	21.3	5.1	1.8	.7	.2	9.6
George Gervin	SG	79	79	2,817	392	187	77	45	2,551	35.7	5.0	2.4	1.0	.6	32.3
Johnny Moore	PG	79	78	2,294	275	762	163	12	741	29.0	3.5	9.6	2.1	.2	9.4
George T. Johnson	C	75	62	1,578	454	79	20	234	225	21.0	6.1	1.1	.3	3.1	3.0
Mark Olberding	PF	68	63	2,098	439	202	57	29	941	30.9	6.5	3.0	.8	.4	13.8
Mike Mitchell^{†}	SF	57	57	2,090	449	43	33	28	1,196	36.7	7.9	.8	.6	.5	21.0
Roger Phegley^{†}	SG	54	1	617	83	61	20	6	308	11.4	1.5	1.1	.4	.1	5.7
Ed Rains	SF	49	15	637	80	40	18	2	192	13.0	1.6	.8	.4	.0	3.9
Ron Brewer^{†}	SG	25	4	595	50	67	23	7	444	23.8	2.0	2.7	.9	.3	17.8
Paul Griffin	PF	23	0	459	95	54	20	8	88	20.0	4.1	2.3	.9	.3	3.8
Reggie Johnson^{†}	PF	21	17	504	137	20	7	16	220	24.0	6.5	1.0	.3	.8	10.5
John Lambert^{†}	PF	21	6	271	51	13	6	6	65	12.9	2.4	.6	.3	.3	3.1
Kevin Restani^{†}	PF	13	0	145	35	7	1	4	21	11.2	2.7	.5	.1	.3	1.6
Rich Yonakor	PF	10	0	70	27	3	1	2	33	7.0	2.7	.3	.1	.2	3.3
Steve Hayes^{†}	C	9	0	75	17	4	1	2	23	8.3	1.9	.4	.1	.2	2.6

- ^{†} Denotes player spent time with another team in the season. Stats reflect time with the Spurs only.

=== Playoffs ===
Player	POS	GP	GS	MP	REB	AST	STL	BLK	PTS	MPG	RPG	APG	SPG	BPG	PPG
George Gervin	SG	9		373	66	41	10	4	265	41.4	7.3	4.6	1.1	.4	29.4
Mike Mitchell	SF	9		365	73	7	5	1	223	40.6	8.1	.8	.6	.1	24.8
Mark Olberding	PF	9		328	58	32	9	6	132	36.4	6.4	3.6	1.0	.7	14.7
Johnny Moore	PG	9		292	31	93	15	6	94	32.4	3.4	10.3	1.7	.7	10.4
Dave Corzine	C	9		258	85	17	6	9	122	28.7	9.4	1.9	.7	1.0	13.6
Mike Bratz	PG	9		180	14	48	9	0	43	20.0	1.6	5.3	1.0	.0	4.8
George T. Johnson	C	9		175	46	12	6	15	11	19.4	5.1	1.3	.7	1.7	1.2
Gene Banks	SF	9		146	43	9	4	3	64	16.2	4.8	1.0	.4	.3	7.1
Ed Rains	SF	5		30	8	1	1	0	10	6.0	1.6	.2	.2	.0	2.0
Roger Phegley	SG	5		6	0	0	0	0	0	1.2	.0	.0	.0	.0	.0
Rich Yonakor	PF	2		4	1	1	1	0	2	2.0	.5	.5	.5	.0	1.0
John Lambert	PF	2		3	1	1	0	0	0	1.5	.5	.5	.0	.0	.0

== Awards and honors ==
- George Gervin, All-NBA First Team
- George Gervin, NBA Scoring Champion
