= Rich Yonakor =

American basketball player

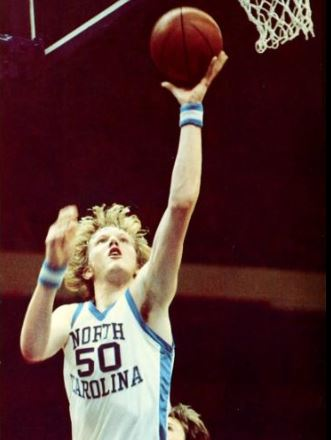
- Yonakor as a freshman at UNC

Personal information
- Born: October 3, 1958 Euclid, Ohio, U.S.
- Died: March 3, 2022 (aged 63)
- Listed height: 6 ft 9 in (2.06 m)
- Listed weight: 220 lb (100 kg)

Career information
- High school: Euclid (Euclid, Ohio)
- College: North Carolina (1976–1980)
- NBA draft: 1980: 3rd round, 61st overall pick
- Drafted by: San Antonio Spurs
- Position: Power forward
- Number: 43

Career history
- 1980–1981: Bartolini Brindisi
- 1981: Rochester Zeniths
- 1981–1982: Montana Golden Nuggets
- 1982: San Antonio Spurs
- Stats at NBA.com
- Stats at Basketball Reference

Richard Robert Yonakor (October 3, 1958 – March 3, 2022) was an American basketball player. He played one season for the San Antonio Spurs of the National Basketball Association (NBA).

Yonakor, a 6'9" forward/center from Euclid, Ohio, played collegiately at the University of North Carolina from 1976 to 1980 where he averaged 5.4 points and 3.7 rebounds per game for his career.

Despite his modest college statistics, Yonakor was drafted in the third round of the 1980 NBA draft by the San Antonio Spurs. After playing a season in Italy for Bartolini Brindisi, Yonakor made his NBA debut on March 8, 1982. He appeared in 10 games, averaging 3.3 points and 2.3 rebounds per game in his only NBA season. He also played in the Continental Basketball Association for the Rochester Zeniths and Montana Golden Nuggets.

Rich was the son of former NFL football player John Yonakor.

Rich Yonakor died on March 3, 2022.

== Career statistics ==
Legend
GP	Games played	GS	Games started	MPG	Minutes per game
FG%	Field goal percentage	3P%	3-point field goal percentage	FT%	Free throw percentage
RPG	Rebounds per game	APG	Assists per game	SPG	Steals per game
BPG	Blocks per game	PPG	Points per game	**Bold**	Career high

=== NBA ===
==== Regular season ====
Year	Team	GP	GS	MPG	FG%	3P%	FT%	RPG	APG	SPG	BPG	PPG
1981–82	San Antonio	10	0	7.0	.538	–	.714	2.7	.3	.1	.2	3.3

==== Playoffs ====
Year	Team	GP	MPG	FG%	3P%	FT%	RPG	APG	SPG	BPG	PPG
1982	San Antonio	2	2.0	.500	–	–	.5	.5	.5	.0	1.0
