= Phegley =

Phegley is a surname. Notable people with the surname include:

- Josh Phegley (born 1988), American baseball catcher
- Roger Phegley (born 1956), American basketball player
