= 1981–82 New Jersey Nets season =

New Jersey Nets' 6th season in the NBA

- Head coach: Larry Brown
- Arena: Brendan Byrne Arena

Results
- Record: 44–38 (.537)
- Place: Division: 3rd (Atlantic); Conference: 4th (Eastern)
- Playoff finish: First round (lost to Bullets 0–2)
- Stats at Basketball Reference

The 1981–82 New Jersey Nets season was the Nets' sixth season in the NBA. The Nets moved their home games from the Rutgers Athletic Center in Piscataway to the Brendan Byrne Arena in East Rutherford.

== Draft picks ==
Round	Pick	Player	Position	Nationality	College
1	3	Buck Williams	PF/C	United States	Maryland
1	10	Albert King	SF/SG	United States	Maryland
1	18	Ray Tolbert	PF	United States	Indiana
3	49	David Burns	G	United States	St. Louis
4	72	Ed Sherod	G	United States	Virginia Commonwealth
5	95	Joe Cooper	C/PF	United States	Colorado
6	118	Kevin Lynam		United States	La Salle
7	141	Rod Robertson		United States	Northwestern
8	164	Ken Webb		United States	Farleigh Dickinson
9	186	Rudy Williams		United States	Providence
10	206	Vic Sison		United States	UCLA

== Roster ==
1981–82 New Jersey Nets roster
Players

Pos.	No.	Player	Height	Weight	DOB	From
F	33	James Bailey	6 ft 9 in (2.06 m)	220 lb (100 kg)	1957-05-21	Rutgers
G	10	Otis Birdsong (injured)	6 ft 3 in (1.91 m)	190 lb (86 kg)	1955-12-09	Houston
G	12	Darwin Cook	6 ft 3 in (1.91 m)	184 lb (83 kg)	1958-08-06	Portland
F/C	44	Len Elmore	6 ft 9 in (2.06 m)	220 lb (100 kg)	1952-03-28	Maryland
C	42	Mike Gminski	6 ft 11 in (2.11 m)	250 lb (113 kg)	1959-08-03	Duke
F	55	Albert King	6 ft 6 in (1.98 m)	190 lb (86 kg)	1959-12-17	Maryland
C	40	Sam Lacey	6 ft 10 in (2.08 m)	235 lb (107 kg)	1948-03-28	New Mexico State
F	31	Mike O'Koren	6 ft 7 in (2.01 m)	207 lb (94 kg)	1958-02-07	North Carolina
G	15	Ed Sherod	6 ft 2 in (1.88 m)	170 lb (77 kg)	1959-09-13	VCU
F	20	Jan van Breda Kolff	6 ft 7 in (2.01 m)	195 lb (88 kg)	1951-12-16	Vanderbilt
G	1	Foots Walker	6 ft 0 in (1.83 m)	184 lb (83 kg)	1951-05-21	West Georgia
F	52	Buck Williams	6 ft 8 in (2.03 m)	215 lb (98 kg)	1954-10-14	Maryland
G	13	Ray Williams	6 ft 3 in (1.91 m)	188 lb (85 kg)	1954-10-14	Minnesota

Coaches
Head coach
- Larry Brown
Assistant(s)
- Bill Blair
- Mike Schuler

Legend
- (DP) Unsigned draft pick
- (FA) Free agent
- (S) Suspended
- Injured

== Regular season ==
=== Season standings ===
Atlantic Division	W	L	PCT	GB	Home	Road	Div
y-Boston Celtics	63	19	.768	–	35–6	28–13	20–4
x-Philadelphia 76ers	58	24	.707	5.0	32–9	26–15	16–8
x-New Jersey Nets	44	38	.537	19.0	25–16	19–22	12–12
x-Washington Bullets	43	39	.524	20.0	22–19	21–20	7–17
New York Knicks	33	49	.402	30.0	19–22	14–27	5–19

#	Eastern Conference				
#	Team	W	L	PCT	GB
1	z-Boston Celtics	63	19	.768	–
2	y-Milwaukee Bucks	55	27	.671	8
3	x-Philadelphia 76ers	58	24	.707	5
4	x-New Jersey Nets	44	38	.537	19
5	x-Washington Bullets	43	39	.524	20
6	x-Atlanta Hawks	42	40	.512	21
7	Detroit Pistons	39	43	.476	24
8	Indiana Pacers	35	47	.427	28
9	Chicago Bulls	34	48	.415	29
10	New York Knicks	33	49	.402	30
11	Cleveland Cavaliers	15	67	.183	48

z – clinched division title
y – clinched division title
x – clinched playoff spot

== Game log ==
=== Regular season ===
1981–82 game log
Total: 44–38 (home: 25–16; road: 19–22)
October: 0–1 (home: 0–1; road: 0–0)

Game	Date	Team	Score	High points	High rebounds	High assists	Location Attendance	Record
1	October 30, 1981	New York	L 99–103				Brendan Byrne Arena	0–1

November: 3–10 (home: 2–1; road: 1–9)

Game	Date	Team	Score	High points	High rebounds	High assists	Location Attendance	Record
2
3
4
5
6	November 10, 1981	@ New York	L 99–111				Madison Square Garden	1–5
7
8	November 13, 1981	@ Boston						
9
10
11
12
13
14	November 27, 1981	@ San Antonio						
15

December: 8–6 (home: 4–4; road: 4–2)

Game	Date	Team	Score	High points	High rebounds	High assists	Location Attendance	Record
16
17	December 5, 1981	Philadelphia	L 105–114				Brendan Byrne Arena	4–13
18
19	December 9, 1981	@ Boston						
20
21
22
23
24
25	December 23, 1981	New York	W 115–99				Brendan Byrne Arena	9–16
26	December 25, 1981	@ New York	W 96–95				Madison Square Garden	10–16
27
28
29

January: 8–6 (home: 3–2; road: 5–4)

Game	Date	Team	Score	High points	High rebounds	High assists	Location Attendance	Record
30
31
32
33
34	January 9, 1982	@ Philadelphia	W 120–113				The Spectrum	14–20
35	January 11, 1982	Boston						
36
37
38	January 17, 1982	Philadelphia	W 115–107				Brendan Byrne Arena	16–22
39	January 20, 1982	@ Los Angeles	L 113–132				The Forum	16–23
40
41
42
43

February: 10–5 (home: 7–3; road: 3–2)

Game	Date	Team	Score	High points	High rebounds	High assists	Location Attendance	Record
44
45
46	February 5, 1982	@ Philadelphia	L 112–116				The Spectrum	21–25
47
48
49
50
51
52
53
54
55
56
57
58

March: 8–7 (home: 5–3; road: 3–4)

Game	Date	Team	Score	High points	High rebounds	High assists	Location Attendance	Record
59
60	March 3, 1982	Los Angeles	W 111–103				Brendan Byrne Arena	31–29
61
62
63
64	March 12, 1982	Boston						
65
66	March 17, 1982	San Antonio						
67
68
69	March 24, 1982	@ Philadelphia	W 111–106				The Spectrum	35–34
70
71
72	March 28, 1982	New York	W 113–106				Brendan Byrne Arena	36–36
73

April: 7–2 (home: 4–1; road: 3–1)

Game	Date	Team	Score	High points	High rebounds	High assists	Location Attendance	Record
74
75
76	April 7, 1982	Philadelphia	L 113–116				Brendan Byrne Arena	39–37
77	April 9, 1982	@ Boston						
78
79	April 13, 1982	@ New York	W 104–102				Madison Square Garden	41–38
80
81	April 16, 1982	Boston						
82

1981–82 schedule

=== Playoffs ===
1982 playoff game log
First Round: 0–2 (home: 0–1; road: 0–1)

Game	Date	Team	Score	High points	High rebounds	High assists	Location Attendance	Series
1	April 20	Washington	L 83–96	Buck Williams (23)	Buck Williams (13)	Ray Williams (8)	Brendan Byrne Arena; 14,015	0–1
2	April 23	@ Washington	L 92–103	Ray Williams (23)	Len Elmore (9)	Ray Williams (6)	Capital Centre; 19,035	0–2

1982 schedule

== Awards and records ==
- Buck Williams, NBA Rookie of the Year Award
- Buck Williams, NBA All-Rookie Team 1st Team

== See also ==
- 1981–82 NBA season
