= John Yonakor =

American football player (1921–2001)

- Yonakor while playing for the Cleveland Browns

No. 50, 74, 79
- Positions: End, defensive end

Personal information
- Born: August 4, 1921; Boston, Massachusetts, U.S.
- Died: April 18, 2001 (aged 79); Euclid, Ohio, U.S.
- Listed height: 6 ft 5 in (1.96 m)
- Listed weight: 222 lb (101 kg)

Career information
- High school: Mechanic Arts (Boston)
- College: Notre Dame (1942-1943)
- NFL draft: 1945: 1st round, 9th overall pick

Career history
- Cleveland Browns (1946–1949); New York Yanks (1950); Montreal Alouettes (1951); Washington Redskins (1952)

Awards and highlights
- 4× AAFC champion (1946–1949); National champion (1943); Consensus All-American (1943)

Career NFL/AAFC statistics
- Receptions: 18
- Receiving yards: 220
- Touchdowns: 4
- Stats at Pro Football Reference

John Joseph "Jumbo" Yonakor (August 4, 1921 – April 18, 2001) was an American professional football defensive and offensive end in the All-America Football Conference (AAFC) and National Football League (NFL) for the Cleveland Browns, New York Yanks, and Washington Redskins.

Yonakor grew up in Boston, Massachusetts and played college football at the University of Notre Dame, where he was named an All-American on a team that won the national championship in 1943. After two years in the military during World War II, Yonakor was selected in the first round of the 1945 NFL draft by the Philadelphia Eagles. He instead signed with the Browns of the upstart AAFC. Yonakor spent four seasons playing primarily as a defensive end for the Browns as the team won four league championships between 1946 and 1949. The Browns then sold Yonakor to the NFL's New York Yanks, where he played for a year. He then spent a season with the Montreal Alouettes in the Canadian Football League. Returning to the NFL in 1952, he played a final season for the Redskins before retiring.

Yonakor worked in Cleveland's steel industry for several years after leaving pro football. He settled in Euclid, Ohio in the early 1960s and was an assembly-line worker making diesel engines for White Motor Company. His son Rich was a star athlete in Euclid and went on to play one season for the National Basketball Association's San Antonio Spurs. Yonakor died in 2001.

== Early life ==
Yonakor grew up in the Dorchester neighborhood of Boston, Massachusetts, the youngest son of immigrants from Lithuania. At the age of 10, he came down with a leg infection after cutting himself while ice skating. He was too embarrassed to tell his mother about the injury and hoped it would go away, but it worsened to the point where he could no longer walk. Doctors drained fluid from his body by puncturing his toe, and Yonakor spent a year as an invalid; doctors told him he might never walk again. Starting out by crawling, however, Yonakor gradually regained his strength and his health. He went on to play three seasons of football at Mechanic Arts High School, and spent one year at Marianapolis Preparatory School in Thompson, Connecticut at the prompting of Frank Leahy, then the head football coach at Boston College. Yonakor was set to go to Boston College, but chose the University of Notre Dame instead when Leahy became head football coach there in 1941.

== College and military career ==
At Notre Dame in South Bend, Indiana, Yonakor played on the football team as an end beginning in 1942, when he was a sophomore. He was a starter at right end in 1943, when the Notre Dame Fighting Irish football team won the national championship under Leahy. The highlight of his college career was catching two touchdown passes from quarterback Angelo Bertelli in a game against Army. Yonakor was known for his strength and large size. While watching track athletes practice at Notre Dame in 1943, he picked up a 16-pound shot putter's weight and returned it to the thrower. Impressed by the distance of the throw, the track coach got Yonakor to compete in the event, and two weeks later Yonakor won the Amateur Athletic Union indoor shot put national competition at Madison Square Garden in New York City. He was named an All-American by news outlets that year.

Following the 1943 season, Yonakor spent two years in the U.S. Marines during World War II and played on military football teams. In 1944, he was selected to play in the College All-Star Game, a now-defunct matchup between the National Football League (NFL) champion and a selection of the best college players in the country.

== Professional career ==
Creighton Miller, a teammate of Yonakor's at Notre Dame, took an assistant coaching position after the war with the Cleveland Browns, a team under formation in the new All-America Football Conference (AAFC). While Yonakor selected ninth overall by the Philadelphia Eagles in the first round of the 1945 NFL draft, Miller convinced him to sign with the Browns instead. The Browns won the AAFC championship in each of the four years Yonakor played for the team between 1946 and 1949. He started out as primarily a pass-rushing defensive end in 1946, but was also used as an offensive end when receiver Dante Lavelli was injured in 1947. After watching one of the Browns' early games, Leahy said that the Browns were good, but "I don't understand why they don't throw more passes to Yonakor". He had just six receptions for 95 yards and two touchdowns in 1947, however, and was shifted back to working mostly on defense in 1948. Yonakor completed coursework at Notre Dame between seasons with the Browns and got his degree in 1948. Yonakor got into contractual disputes three times with Paul Brown, the Browns' head coach and general manager, and frequently held out for raises. His highest salary with the Browns was $9,500 in 1949.

The AAFC dissolved after the 1949 season and the Browns were absorbed by the National Football League (NFL). Yonakor, however, was sold before the 1950 season to the NFL's New York Yanks. He played a season for the Yanks before signing with the Montreal Alouettes of the Canadian Football League in the summer of 1951. he played a final season for the NFL's Washington Redskins in 1952 before retiring. He was used by the Redskins as an end and a tackle.

== Later life ==
Yonakor went back home to Boston after ending his football career and worked in several sales jobs he found unsatisfying. He planned to go to California to find work, but stopped off in Cleveland on the way to make some money for the journey onward. He worked briefly in the structural iron business before getting a job in 1956 at Republic Steel, then one of the country's largest producers of the metal. He was promoted in 1959 to superintendent of Republic's general labor department and oversaw more than 500 workers. He got married and settled down in Cleveland, attending Browns games as he worked at Republic. "I learned teamwork and got used to being around men and learning to get along with them," he said in 1960. "Out here at Republic we operate on the same theory as the Browns – all for one and one for all."

In 1961, Yonakor began working for the White Motor Company in Euclid, Ohio, a suburb of Cleveland where he lived. He made diesel engines on an assembly line in a White Motors plant there. His son, Rich Yonakor, was a star athlete in Euclid who played basketball in Italy and one season for the San Antonio Spurs in the early 1980s. Yonakor died in Euclid in 2001.
