= Vögele =

Vögele is a German surname. Notable people with the surname include:

- Guido Vögele (born 1937), Swiss long-distance runner
- Stefanie Vögele (born 1990), Swiss tennis player

== See also ==
- Voegele
- Vogel (surname)
