= 1982 NBA playoffs =

Postseason tournament

Tournament details
- Dates: April 20–June 8, 1982
- Season: 1981–82
- Teams: 12

Final positions
- Champions: Los Angeles Lakers (8th title)
- Runners-up: Philadelphia 76ers
- Semifinalists: San Antonio Spurs; Boston Celtics

Tournament statistics
- Scoring leader(s): Julius Erving (76ers) (22.0 PPG)

Awards
- MVP: Magic Johnson (Lakers)

The 1982 NBA playoffs were the postseason tournament of the National Basketball Association's 1981–82 season. The tournament concluded with the Western Conference champion Los Angeles Lakers defeating the Eastern Conference champion Philadelphia 76ers 4 games to 2 in the NBA Finals. Magic Johnson was named NBA Finals MVP for the second time.

It was the second NBA Finals meeting in three years between the Lakers and Sixers, and ended with the same result—a 4–2 Lakers victory—as the previous confrontation. They met again in 1983, with Philadelphia getting revenge in a sweep. The Sixers beat the Celtics again in the Eastern Conference Finals, the second of their three series wins in a four-year stretch.

The Bullets' 2–0 sweep of the Nets was their last playoff series victory until 2005.

This was the third straight year the Bucks failed to advance to the third round with the #2 seed despite a first-round bye, although they did not have the better record in each of those matchups, and thus not having home-court advantage.

== Bracket ==
First Round
E4	New Jersey	0
E5	Washington	2
E3	Philadelphia	2
E6	Atlanta	0
W4	Denver	1
W5	Phoenix	2
W3	Seattle	2
W6	Houston	1

Conference Semifinals
E1	Boston*	4
E5	Washington	1
Eastern Conference
E3	Philadelphia	4
E2	Milwaukee*	2
W1	Los Angeles*	4
W5	Phoenix	0
Western Conference
W3	Seattle	1
W2	San Antonio*	4

Conference Finals
E1	Boston*	3
E3	Philadelphia	4
W1	Los Angeles*	4
W2	San Antonio*	0

NBA Finals
E3	Philadelphia	2
W1	Los Angeles*	4

- * Division winner
- Bold Series winner
- Italic Team with home-court advantage

== First round ==
=== Eastern Conference first round ===
==== (3) Philadelphia 76ers vs. (6) Atlanta Hawks ====
April 21

Boxscore

Atlanta Hawks 76, Philadelphia 76ers 111
Scoring by quarter: 20–28, 16–25, 22–26, 18–32
Pts: John Drew 18; Rebs: Dan Roundfield 11; Asts: Rory Sparrow 8	Pts: Darryl Dawkins 27; Rebs: Darryl Dawkins 9 Asts: Maurice Cheeks 6
Philadelphia leads series, 1–0

Spectrum, Philadelphia, Pennsylvania
Attendance: 11,250
Referees: Jack Madden, Wally Rooney

April 23

Boxscore

Philadelphia 76ers 98, Atlanta Hawks 95 (OT)
Scoring by quarter: 21–20, 19–19, 23–29, 27–22, Overtime: 8–5
Pts: Julius Erving 28; Rebs: Dawkins, C. Jones 8 each Asts: Julius Erving 6	Pts: Dan Roundfield 29; Rebs: Dan Roundfield 11; Asts: Eddie Johnson 4
Philadelphia wins series, 2–0

Omni Coliseum, Atlanta, Georgia
Attendance: 8,703
Referees: John Vanak, Paul Mihalak

- This is the most recent playoff series between the 76ers & Hawks until 2021.

Regular-season series
Tied 3–3 in the regular-season series

October 31, 1981

Recap

Philadelphia 76ers 108, Atlanta Hawks 106

The Omni, Atlanta

November 6, 1981

Recap

Atlanta Hawks 106, Philadelphia 76ers 99

Spectrum, Philadelphia

December 1, 1981

Recap

Philadelphia 76ers 107, Atlanta Hawks 98

The Omni, Atlanta

January 15, 1982

Recap

Atlanta Hawks 96, Philadelphia 76ers 90

Spectrum, Philadelphia

March 5, 1982

Recap

Atlanta Hawks 80, Philadelphia 76ers 89

Spectrum, Philadelphia

April 9, 1982

Recap

Philadelphia 76ers 88, Atlanta Hawks 103

The Omni, Atlanta

This was the second playoff meeting between these two teams, with the 76ers winning the first meeting.

Previous playoff series
Philadelphia leads 1–0 in all-time playoff series

1980

Atlanta Hawks 1, Philadelphia 76ers 4

1980 Eastern Conference Semifinals

==== (4) New Jersey Nets vs. (5) Washington Bullets ====
April 20

Boxscore

Washington Bullets 96, New Jersey Nets 83
Scoring by quarter: 16–24, 25–21, 22–18, 33–20
Pts: Jeff Ruland 18; Rebs: Jeff Ruland 20; Asts: Frank Johnson 11	Pts: Buck Williams 23; Rebs: Buck Williams 13; Asts: Ray Williams 8
Washington leads series, 1–0

Brendan Byrne Arena, East Rutherford, New Jersey
Attendance: 14,015
Referees: John Vanak, Hugh Evans, Joe Crawford

April 23

Boxscore

New Jersey Nets 92, Washington Bullets 103
Scoring by quarter: 30–22, 20–25, 18–24, 24–32
Pts: Ray Williams 23; Rebs: Len Elmore 9 Asts: Ray Williams 6	Pts: Kevin Grevey 23; Rebs: Rick Mahorn 11; Asts: Frank Johnson 9
Washington wins series, 2–0

Capital Centre, Landover, Maryland
Attendance: 19,035
Referees: Ed Rush, Jess Kersey

Regular-season series
New Jersey won 4–2 in the regular-season series

December 26, 1981

Recap

Washington Bullets 105, New Jersey Nets 90

Brendan Byrne Arena, East Rutherford, New Jersey

January 5, 1982

Recap

New Jersey Nets 114, Washington Bullets 108

Capital Centre, Landover, Maryland

March 2, 1982

Recap

New Jersey Nets 130, Washington Bullets 124 (2OT)

Capital Centre, Landover, Maryland

March 26, 1982

Recap

New Jersey Nets 88, Washington Bullets 104

Capital Centre, Landover, Maryland

April 2, 1982

Recap

Washington Bullets 96, New Jersey Nets 98

Brendan Byrne Arena, East Rutherford, New Jersey

April 14, 1982

Recap

Washington Bullets 94, New Jersey Nets 98

Brendan Byrne Arena, East Rutherford, New Jersey

This was the first playoff meeting between the Nets and the Bullets.

=== Western Conference first round ===
==== (3) Seattle SuperSonics vs. (6) Houston Rockets ====
April 21

Boxscore

Houston Rockets 87, Seattle SuperSonics 102
Scoring by quarter: 25–19, 19–22, 16–29, 27–32
Pts: Moses Malone 20; Rebs: Moses Malone 15; Asts: Tom Henderson 7	Pts: Gus Williams 27; Rebs: Jack Sikma 13; Asts: Gus Williams 12
Seattle leads series, 1–0

Kingdome, Seattle, Washington
Attendance: 14,071
Referees: Earl Strom, Jess Kersey

April 23

Boxscore

Seattle SuperSonics 70, Houston Rockets 91
Scoring by quarter: 17–25, 17–17, 19–21, 17–28
Pts: Gus Williams 18; Rebs: Jack Sikma 11; Asts: four players 3 each	Pts: Moses Malone 28; Rebs: Moses Malone 23; Asts: Allen Leavell 6
Series tied, 1–1

The Summit, Houston, Texas
Attendance: 15,676
Referees: Jack Madden, Ed Middleton, Tommy Nunez Sr.

April 25

Boxscore

Houston Rockets 83, Seattle SuperSonics 104
Scoring by quarter: 20–27, 10–19, 27–29, 26–29
Pts: Moses Malone 24; Rebs: Moses Malone 13; Asts: Mike Dunleavy 5	Pts: Jack Sikma 30; Rebs: Jack Sikma 17; Asts: Gus Williams 12
Seattle wins series, 2–1

Kingdome, Seattle, Washington
Attendance: 14,071
Referees: Jake O'Donnell, Wally Rooney

Regular-season series
Seattle won 3–2 in the regular-season series

November 27, 1981

Recap

Houston Rockets 110, Seattle SuperSonics 117

Kingdome, Seattle

December 8, 1981

Recap

Seattle SuperSonics 107, Houston Rockets 96

The Summit, Houston

January 7, 1982

Recap

Houston Rockets 107, Seattle SuperSonics 116

Kingdome, Seattle

February 11, 1982

Recap

Seattle SuperSonics 100, Houston Rockets 117

The Summit, Houston

March 26, 1982

Recap

Houston Rockets 99, Seattle SuperSonics 97

Kingdome, Seattle

This was the first playoff meeting between the Rockets and the SuperSonics.

==== (4) Denver Nuggets vs. (5) Phoenix Suns ====
April 20

Boxscore

Phoenix Suns 113, Denver Nuggets 129
Scoring by quarter: 30–35, 29–27, 21–40, 33–27
Pts: Kyle Macy 22; Rebs: Truck Robinson 13; Asts: Truck Robinson 6	Pts: Kiki VanDeWeghe 29; Rebs: Alex English 10; Asts: English, McKinney 5 each
Denver leads series, 1–0

McNichols Sports Arena, Denver, Colorado
Attendance: 17,298
Referees: Darell Garretson, Ed Middleton

April 23

Boxscore

Denver Nuggets 110, Phoenix Suns 126
Scoring by quarter: 21–40, 36–28, 28–27, 25–31
Pts: Dan Issel 26; Rebs: Alex English 6 Asts: English, Gondrezick 5 each	Pts: Dennis Johnson 29; Rebs: Alvan Adams 9 Asts: Dennis Johnson 8
Series tied, 1–1

Arizona Veterans Memorial Coliseum, Phoenix, Arizona
Attendance: 12,798
Referees: Jake O'Donnell, Mike Mathis

April 24

Boxscore

Phoenix Suns 124, Denver Nuggets 119
Scoring by quarter: 36–31, 30–39, 36–25, 22–24
Pts: Dennis Johnson 26; Rebs: Truck Robinson 9 Asts: Rich Kelley 7	Pts: Dan Issel 26; Rebs: Issel, Dunn 10 each Asts: Alex English 7
Phoenix wins series, 2–1

McNichols Sports Arena, Denver, Colorado
Attendance: 17,443
Referees: Jack Madden, Paul Mihalak

Regular-season series
Phoenix won 3–2 in the regular-season series

November 10, 1981

Recap

Phoenix Suns 109, Denver Nuggets 106

McNichols Sports Arena, Denver, Colorado

December 3, 1981

Recap

Denver Nuggets 109, Phoenix Suns 137

Arizona Veterans Memorial Coliseum, Phoenix, Arizona

February 26, 1982

Recap

Denver Nuggets 122, Phoenix Suns 131

Arizona Veterans Memorial Coliseum, Phoenix, Arizona

March 17, 1982

Recap

Denver Nuggets 135, Phoenix Suns 133 (OT)

Arizona Veterans Memorial Coliseum, Phoenix, Arizona

March 27, 1982

Recap

Phoenix Suns 134, Denver Nuggets 140 (2OT)

McNichols Sports Arena, Denver, Colorado

This was the first playoff meeting between the Suns and the Nuggets.

== Conference semifinals ==
=== Eastern Conference semifinals ===
==== (1) Boston Celtics vs. (5) Washington Bullets ====
April 25

Boxscore

Washington Bullets 91, Boston Celtics 109
Scoring by quarter: 27–29, 25–21, 15–24, 24–35
Pts: Spencer Haywood 17; Rebs: Greg Ballard 9 Asts: Frank Johnson 6	Pts: M. L. Carr 21; Rebs: Larry Bird 12; Asts: Tiny Archibald 7
Boston leads series, 1–0

Boston Garden, Boston, Massachusetts
Attendance: 15,320

April 28

Boxscore

Washington Bullets 103, Boston Celtics 102
Scoring by quarter: 22–20, 22–31, 33–23, 26–28
Pts: Johnson, Haywood 26 each Rebs: Jeff Ruland 10; Asts: Frank Johnson 8	Pts: Larry Bird 26; Rebs: Bird, Parish 10 each Asts: Tiny Archibald 6
Series tied, 1–1

Boston Garden, Boston, Massachusetts
Attendance: 15,320

- Frank Johnson hits the game-winning 3 pointer with 3 seconds left.

May 1

Boxscore

Boston Celtics 92, Washington Bullets 83
Scoring by quarter: 28–18, 20–20, 23–22, 21–23
Pts: Robert Parish 25; Rebs: Parish, Archibald 13 each Asts: Tiny Archibald 5	Pts: Spencer Haywood 19; Rebs: Rick Mahorn 14; Asts: Frank Johnson 8
Boston leads series, 2–1

Capital Centre, Landover, Maryland
Attendance: 15,035

May 2

Boxscore

Boston Celtics 103, Washington Bullets 99 (OT)
Scoring by quarter: 24–26, 20–23, 25–24, 22–18, Overtime: 12–8
Pts: Robert Parish 28; Rebs: Robert Parish 15; Asts: Tiny Archibald 4	Pts: Spencer Haywood 28; Rebs: Rick Mahorn 10; Asts: Frank Johnson 7
Boston leads series, 3–1

Capital Centre, Landover, Maryland
Attendance: 16,295

May 5

Boxscore

Washington Bullets 126, Boston Celtics 131 (2OT)
Scoring by quarter: 22–27, 30–25, 21–34, 33–20, Overtime: 13–13, 7–12
Pts: Jeff Ruland 33; Rebs: Jeff Ruland 13; Asts: Frank Johnson 10	Pts: Robert Parish 33; Rebs: Robert Parish 13; Asts: Tiny Archibald 11
Boston wins series, 4–1

Boston Garden, Boston, Massachusetts
Attendance: 15,320
Referees: Jake O'Donnell, Mike Mathis, Bill Saar

- Jeff Ruland hits the game-tying free throws with 24 seconds left to force OT.

Regular-season series
Boston won 6–0 in the regular-season series

October 30, 1981

Recap

Washington Bullets 100, Boston Celtics 124

Boston Garden, Boston

November 10, 1981

Recap

Boston Celtics 90, Washington Bullets 84

Capital Centre, Landover, Maryland

November 27, 1981

Recap

Washington Bullets 100, Boston Celtics 113

Boston Garden, Boston

December 18, 1981

Recap

Boston Celtics 99, Washington Bullets 98

Capital Centre, Landover, Maryland

March 16, 1982

Recap

Boston Celtics 98, Washington Bullets 97 (OT)

Capital Centre, Landover, Maryland

March 31, 1982

Recap

Washington Bullets 109, Boston Celtics 119

Boston Garden, Boston

This was the second playoff meeting between these two teams, with the Bullets winning the first meeting.

Previous playoff series
Washington leads 1–0 in all-time playoff series

1975

Boston Celtics 2, Washington Bullets 4

1975 Eastern Conference Finals

==== (2) Milwaukee Bucks vs. (3) Philadelphia 76ers ====
April 25

Boxscore

Milwaukee Bucks 122, Philadelphia 76ers 125
Scoring by quarter: 38–35, 28–32, 32–30, 24–28
Pts: Mickey Johnson 28; Rebs: Marques Johnson 7 Asts: Brian Winters 5	Pts: Julius Erving 34; Rebs: Caldwell Jones 16; Asts: Maurice Cheeks 10
Philadelphia leads series, 1–0

Spectrum, Philadelphia, Pennsylvania
Attendance: 10,086
Referees: Ed Rush, Hugh Evans

April 28

Boxscore

Milwaukee Bucks 108, Philadelphia 76ers 120
Scoring by quarter: 22–31, 22–26, 26–30, 38–33
Pts: Brian Winters 21; Rebs: Bob Lanier 11; Asts: Winters, May 5 each	Pts: Andrew Toney 31; Rebs: Caldwell Jones 9 Asts: Maurice Cheeks 8
Philadelphia leads series, 2–0

Spectrum, Philadelphia, Pennsylvania
Attendance: 14,716
Referees: Jake O'Donnell, Jess Kersey

May 1

Boxscore

Philadelphia 76ers 91, Milwaukee Bucks 92
Scoring by quarter: 16–29, 21–19, 24–19, 30–25
Pts: Maurice Cheeks 19; Rebs: Caldwell Jones 6 Asts: Maurice Cheeks 8	Pts: Mickey Johnson 21; Rebs: Marques Johnson 11; Asts: Marques Johnson 7
Philadelphia leads series, 2–1

MECCA Arena, Milwaukee, Wisconsin
Attendance: 11,052
Referees: Darell Garretson, Mike Mathis

- Sidney Moncrief hits the game-winning buzzer beater.

May 2

Boxscore

Philadelphia 76ers 100, Milwaukee Bucks 93
Scoring by quarter: 29–29, 27–20, 19–22, 25–22
Pts: Julius Erving 21; Rebs: Julius Erving 11; Asts: Julius Erving 9	Pts: Marques Johnson 23; Rebs: Moncrief, Mickey Johnson 7 each Asts: Mickey Johnson 7
Philadelphia leads series, 3–1

MECCA Arena, Milwaukee, Wisconsin
Attendance: 11,052
Referees: Wally Rooney, Paul Mihalak

May 5

Boxscore

Milwaukee Bucks 110, Philadelphia 76ers 98
Scoring by quarter: 28–25, 23–26, 28–28, 31–19
Pts: Bob Lanier 27; Rebs: Alton Lister 11; Asts: Brian Winters 7	Pts: Julius Erving 28; Rebs: Julius Erving 10; Asts: Maurice Cheeks 9
Philadelphia leads series, 3–2

Spectrum, Philadelphia, Pennsylvania
Attendance: 16,668
Referees: Jack Madden, Ed Middleton

May 7

Boxscore

Philadelphia 76ers 102, Milwaukee Bucks 90
Scoring by quarter: 23–27, 27–14, 26–25, 26–24
Pts: Maurice Cheeks 26; Rebs: Caldwell Jones 12; Asts: Julius Erving 7	Pts: Bob Lanier 19; Rebs: Bob Lanier 10; Asts: Brian Winters 6
Philadelphia wins series, 4–2

MECCA Arena, Milwaukee, Wisconsin
Attendance: 11,052
Referees: Earl Strom, John Vanak

Regular-season series
Milwaukee won 4–2 in the regular-season series

November 18, 1981

Recap

Milwaukee Bucks 100, Philadelphia 76ers 102

Spectrum, Philadelphia

December 13, 1981

Recap

Philadelphia 76ers 108, Milwaukee Bucks 127

MECCA Arena, Milwaukee, Wisconsin

January 13, 1982

Recap

Milwaukee Bucks 111, Philadelphia 76ers 107

Spectrum, Philadelphia

March 16, 1982

Recap

Philadelphia 76ers 91, Milwaukee Bucks 106

MECCA Arena, Milwaukee

March 30, 1982

Recap

Philadelphia 76ers 114, Milwaukee Bucks 116 (OT)

MECCA Arena, Milwaukee

April 18, 1982

Recap

Milwaukee Bucks 86, Philadelphia 76ers 110

Spectrum, Philadelphia

This was the third playoff meeting between these two teams, with each team winning one series apiece.

Previous playoff series
Tied 1–1 in all-time playoff series

1970

Milwaukee Bucks 4, Philadelphia 76ers 1

1970 Eastern Division Semifinals

1981

Milwaukee Bucks 3, Philadelphia 76ers 4

1981 Eastern Conference Semifinals

=== Western Conference semifinals ===
==== (1) Los Angeles Lakers vs. (5) Phoenix Suns ====
April 27

Boxscore

Phoenix Suns 96, Los Angeles Lakers 115
Scoring by quarter: 20–32, 33–26, 24–30, 19–27
Pts: D. Johnson, Adams 20 each Rebs: Truck Robinson 14; Asts: three players 4 each	Pts: Jamaal Wilkes 28; Rebs: Bob McAdoo 12; Asts: Magic Johnson 10
Los Angeles leads series, 1–0

The Forum, Inglewood, California
Attendance: 13,623
Referees: Wally Rooney, Mike Mathis

April 28

Boxscore

Phoenix Suns 98, Los Angeles Lakers 117
Scoring by quarter: 16–28, 30–28, 29–35, 23–26
Pts: Dennis Johnson 27; Rebs: Larry Nance 11; Asts: Dennis Johnson 6	Pts: Kareem Abdul-Jabbar 24; Rebs: Magic Johnson 12; Asts: Magic Johnson 12
Los Angeles leads series, 2–0

The Forum, Inglewood, California
Attendance: 15,558
Referees: Darell Garretson, Hue Hollins

April 30

Boxscore

Los Angeles Lakers 114, Phoenix Suns 106
Scoring by quarter: 36–36, 23–20, 29–21, 26–29
Pts: Jamaal Wilkes 26; Rebs: Magic Johnson 14; Asts: Magic Johnson 9	Pts: Alvan Adams 23; Rebs: Alvan Adams 12; Asts: three players 5 each
Los Angeles leads series, 3–0

Arizona Veterans Memorial Coliseum, Phoenix, Arizona
Attendance: 14,660
Referees: Hugh Evans, Joe Crawford

May 2

Boxscore

Los Angeles Lakers 112, Phoenix Suns 107
Scoring by quarter: 36–24, 21–30, 30–30, 25–23
Pts: Jamaal Wilkes 24; Rebs: Kareem Abdul-Jabbar 13; Asts: Magic Johnson 12	Pts: Dennis Johnson 31; Rebs: Macy, Nance 6 each Asts: Alvan Adams 8
Los Angeles wins series, 4–0

Arizona Veterans Memorial Coliseum, Phoenix, Arizona
Attendance: 11,932
Referees: Ed Rush, Ed Middleton

Regular-season series
Los Angeles won 4–2 in the regular-season series

November 6, 1981

Recap

Phoenix Suns 101, Los Angeles Lakers 99

The Forum, Inglewood, California

November 14, 1981

Recap

Los Angeles Lakers 98, Phoenix Suns 97

Arizona Veterans Memorial Coliseum, Phoenix, Arizona

December 25, 1981

Recap

Los Angeles Lakers 104, Phoenix Suns 101

Arizona Veterans Memorial Coliseum, Phoenix, Arizona

January 28, 1982

Recap

Phoenix Suns 87, Los Angeles Lakers 97

The Forum, Inglewood, California

April 2, 1982

Recap

Phoenix Suns 109, Los Angeles Lakers 99

The Forum, Inglewood, California

April 18, 1982

Recap

Los Angeles Lakers 120, Phoenix Suns 115

Arizona Veterans Memorial Coliseum, Phoenix, Arizona

This was the third playoff meeting between these two teams, with the Lakers winning the first two meetings.

Previous playoff series
Los Angeles leads 2–0 in all-time playoff series

1970

Los Angeles Lakers 4, Phoenix Suns 3

1970 Western Division Semifinals

1980

Los Angeles Lakers 4, Phoenix Suns 1

1980 Western Conference Semifinals

==== (2) San Antonio Spurs vs. (3) Seattle SuperSonics ====
April 27

Boxscore

San Antonio Spurs 95, Seattle SuperSonics 93
Scoring by quarter: 23–22, 21–23, 34–16, 17–32
Pts: George Gervin 31; Rebs: Mike Mitchell 11; Asts: Johnny Moore 8	Pts: Jack Sikma 26; Rebs: Jack Sikma 12; Asts: Hanzlik, Brown 4 each
San Antonio leads series, 1–0

Kingdome, Seattle, Washington
Attendance: 14,457
Referees: Ed Rush, Hue Hollins

April 28

Boxscore

San Antonio Spurs 99, Seattle SuperSonics 114
Scoring by quarter: 32–28, 20–30, 27–27, 20–29
Pts: George Gervin 24; Rebs: G. Johnson, Corzine 8 each Asts: Johnny Moore 14	Pts: Gus Williams 34; Rebs: Lonnie Shelton 11; Asts: Gus Williams 9
Series tied, 1–1

Kingdome, Seattle, Washington
Attendance: 19,403
Referees: Bill Saar, Hugh Evans

April 30

Boxscore

Seattle SuperSonics 97, San Antonio Spurs 99
Scoring by quarter: 29–24, 30–18, 12–28, 26–29
Pts: Gus Williams 25; Rebs: Jack Sikma 15; Asts: Gus Williams 11	Pts: George Gervin 36; Rebs: Mike Mitchell 12; Asts: Johnny Moore 12
San Antonio leads series, 2–1

HemisFair Arena, San Antonio, Texas
Attendance: 14,019
Referees: Jake O'Donnell, John Vanak

May 2

Boxscore

Seattle SuperSonics 113, San Antonio Spurs 115
Scoring by quarter: 34–37, 30–23, 26–23, 23–32
Pts: Gus Williams 33; Rebs: James Donaldson 16; Asts: Gus Williams 7	Pts: Mike Mitchell 22; Rebs: Olberding, Banks 9 each Asts: Mike Bratz 10
San Antonio leads series, 3–1

HemisFair Arena, San Antonio, Texas
Attendance: 15,002
Referees: Jack Madden, Joe Crawford

May 5

Boxscore

San Antonio Spurs 109, Seattle SuperSonics 103
Scoring by quarter: 30–34, 28–21, 25–21, 26–27
Pts: George Gervin 26; Rebs: Dave Corzine 11; Asts: Moore, Bratz 9 each	Pts: Gus Williams 36; Rebs: Jack Sikma 11; Asts: Gus Williams 9
San Antonio wins series, 4–1

Kingdome, Seattle, Washington
Attendance: 23,180
Referees: Darell Garretson, Jess Kersey

Regular-season series
San Antonio won 4–1 in the regular-season series

November 13, 1981

Recap

San Antonio Spurs 119, Seattle SuperSonics 112

Kingdome, Seattle

November 18, 1981

Recap

Seattle SuperSonics 93, San Antonio Spurs 101

HemisFair Arena, San Antonio

December 9, 1981

Recap

Seattle SuperSonics 99, San Antonio Spurs 110

HemisFair Arena, San Antonio

February 14, 1982

Recap

Seattle SuperSonics 94, San Antonio Spurs 114

HemisFair Arena, San Antonio

April 2, 1982

Recap

San Antonio Spurs 86, Seattle SuperSonics 111

Kingdome, Seattle

This was the first playoff meeting between the Spurs and the SuperSonics.

== Conference finals ==
=== Eastern Conference finals ===
==== (1) Boston Celtics vs. (3) Philadelphia 76ers ====
May 9

Boxscore

Philadelphia 76ers 81, Boston Celtics 121
Scoring by quarter: 24–30, 21–32, 11–31, 25–28
Pts: Andrew Toney 15; Rebs: four players 7 each Asts: Andrew Toney 4	Pts: Bird, Parish 24 each Rebs: Larry Bird 15; Asts: Larry Bird 10
Boston leads series, 1–0

Boston Garden, Boston, Massachusetts
Attendance: 15,320
Referees: Ed Rush, Hugh Evans

- Held on Mother's Day, Game 1 was infamously known as the "Mother's Day Massacre" as Boston beat Philadelphia by 40 points, which remains the 76ers' worst playoff loss to date.

May 12

Boxscore

Philadelphia 76ers 121, Boston Celtics 113
Scoring by quarter: 31–29, 31–27, 26–34, 33–23
Pts: Andrew Toney 30; Rebs: Caldwell Jones 11; Asts: Maurice Cheeks 14	Pts: Tiny Archibald 24; Rebs: Larry Bird 14; Asts: Tiny Archibald 13
Series tied, 1–1

Boston Garden, Boston, Massachusetts
Attendance: 15,320
Referees: Earl Strom, Paul Mihalak

May 15

Boxscore

Boston Celtics 97, Philadelphia 76ers 99
Scoring by quarter: 28–24, 19–25, 23–31, 27–19
Pts: Cedric Maxwell 18; Rebs: Larry Bird 13; Asts: Larry Bird 11	Pts: Julius Erving 19; Rebs: Caldwell Jones 12; Asts: Maurice Cheeks 10
Philadelphia leads series, 2–1

Spectrum, Philadelphia, Pennsylvania
Attendance: 18,364
Referees: Jack Madden, Wally Rooney

May 16

Boxscore

Boston Celtics 94, Philadelphia 76ers 119
Scoring by quarter: 20–32, 28–23, 25–30, 21–34
Pts: Robert Parish 18; Rebs: Larry Bird 9 Asts: Gerald Henderson 7	Pts: Andrew Toney 39; Rebs: Caldwell Jones 11; Asts: Maurice Cheeks 11
Philadelphia leads series, 3–1

Spectrum, Philadelphia, Pennsylvania
Attendance: 18,364
Referees: Jake O'Donnell, Paul Mihalak

May 19

Boxscore

Philadelphia 76ers 85, Boston Celtics 114
Scoring by quarter: 22–33, 15–24, 27–28, 21–29
Pts: Andrew Toney 18; Rebs: Darryl Dawkins 10; Asts: Lionel Hollins 7	Pts: Robert Parish 26; Rebs: Larry Bird 20; Asts: Larry Bird 8
Philadelphia leads series, 3–2

Boston Garden, Boston, Massachusetts
Attendance: 15,320
Referees: Darell Garretson, Ed Rush

May 21

Boxscore

Boston Celtics 88, Philadelphia 76ers 75
Scoring by quarter: 20–26, 22–22, 19–16, 27–11
Pts: Kevin McHale 17; Rebs: Larry Bird 17; Asts: Danny Ainge 7	Pts: Julius Erving 24; Rebs: Caldwell Jones 17; Asts: Maurice Cheeks 7
Series tied, 3–3

Spectrum, Philadelphia, Pennsylvania
Attendance: 18,364
Referees: Jake O'Donnell, Jack Madden

May 23

Boxscore

Philadelphia 76ers 120, Boston Celtics 106
Scoring by quarter: 30–28, 22–21, 31–22, 37–35
Pts: Andrew Toney 34; Rebs: Caldwell Jones 10; Asts: Maurice Cheeks 11	Pts: Robert Parish 23; Rebs: Robert Parish 14; Asts: Larry Bird 9
Philadelphia wins series, 4–3

Boston Garden, Boston, Massachusetts
Attendance: 15,320
Referees: Darell Garretson, Jack Madden

- The Celtics were not able to overcome a 3–1 series deficit like they had in last season's Eastern Conference finals, losing Game 7 at home. The Sixers became the 2nd team to ever beat the Celtics in a Game 7 in the Garden (after the New York Knicks did in 1973) and the 3rd NBA road team to win Game 7 after leading series 3–1. The Boston Garden crowd in Game 7 chanted "Beat LA! Beat LA!" to the victorious Sixers.

Regular-season series
Boston won 4–2 in the regular-season series

December 4, 1981

Recap

Philadelphia 76ers 103, Boston Celtics 111

Boston Garden, Boston

December 19, 1981

Recap

Boston Celtics 118, Philadelphia 76ers 123 (OT)

Spectrum, Philadelphia

January 8, 1982

Recap

Philadelphia 76ers 90, Boston Celtics 96

Boston Garden, Boston

March 21, 1982

Recap

Boston Celtics 123, Philadelphia 76ers 111

Spectrum, Philadelphia

March 28, 1982

Recap

Philadelphia 76ers 116, Boston Celtics 98

Boston Garden, Boston

April 11, 1982

Recap

Boston Celtics 110, Philadelphia 76ers 109 (OT)

Spectrum, Philadelphia

This was the 17th playoff meeting between these two teams, with the Celtics winning nine of the first 16 meetings.

Previous playoff series
Boston leads 9–7 in all-time playoff series

1953

Boston Celtics 2, Syracuse Nationals 0

1953 Eastern Division Semifinals

1954

Boston Celtics 0, Syracuse Nationals 2

1954 Eastern Division Round Robin semifinals

1954

Boston Celtics 0, Syracuse Nationals 2

1954 Eastern Division Finals

1955

Boston Celtics 1, Syracuse Nationals 3

1955 Eastern Division Finals

1956

Boston Celtics 1, Syracuse Nationals 2

1956 Eastern Division Semifinals

1957

Boston Celtics 3, Syracuse Nationals 0

1957 Eastern Division Finals

1959

Boston Celtics 4, Syracuse Nationals 3

1959 Eastern Division Finals

1961

Boston Celtics 4, Syracuse Nationals 1

1961 Eastern Division Finals

1965

Boston Celtics 4, Philadelphia 76ers 3

1965 Eastern Division Finals

1966

Boston Celtics 4, Philadelphia 76ers 1

1966 Eastern Division Finals

1967

Boston Celtics 1, Philadelphia 76ers 4

1967 Eastern Division Finals

1968

Boston Celtics 4, Philadelphia 76ers 3

1968 Eastern Division Finals

1969

Boston Celtics 4, Philadelphia 76ers 1

1969 Eastern Division Semifinals

1977

Boston Celtics 3, Philadelphia 76ers 4

1977 Eastern Conference Semifinals

1980

Boston Celtics 1, Philadelphia 76ers 4

1980 Eastern Conference Finals

1981

Boston Celtics 4, Philadelphia 76ers 3

1981 Eastern Conference Finals

=== Western Conference finals ===
==== (1) Los Angeles Lakers vs. (2) San Antonio Spurs ====
May 9

Boxscore

San Antonio Spurs 117, Los Angeles Lakers 128
Scoring by quarter: 31–32, 22–31, 38–35, 26–30
Pts: George Gervin 34; Rebs: Dave Corzine 11; Asts: Johnny Moore 12	Pts: Kareem Abdul-Jabbar 32; Rebs: Magic Johnson 16; Asts: Magic Johnson 14
Los Angeles leads series, 1–0

The Forum, Inglewood, California
Attendance: 15,700
Referees: Paul Mihalak, Wally Rooney, Hue Hollins

May 11

Boxscore

San Antonio Spurs 101, Los Angeles Lakers 110
Scoring by quarter: 19–26, 26–23, 34–29, 22–32
Pts: Mike Mitchell 34; Rebs: Dave Corzine 13; Asts: Johnny Moore 11	Pts: Nixon, Wilkes 22 each Rebs: Kurt Rambis 15; Asts: Nixon, M. Johnson 9 each
Los Angeles leads series, 2–0

The Forum, Inglewood, California
Attendance: 17,505
Referees: Jake O'Donnell, Hugh Evans

May 14

Boxscore

Los Angeles Lakers 118, San Antonio Spurs 108
Scoring by quarter: 23–24, 32–24, 26–31, 37–29
Pts: Kareem Abdul-Jabbar 26; Rebs: M. Johnson, Abdul-Jabbar 10 each Asts: Nixon, M. Johnson 10 each	Pts: George Gervin 39; Rebs: George Gervin 15; Asts: Johnny Moore 12
Los Angeles leads series, 3–0

HemisFair Arena, San Antonio, Texas
Attendance: 15,800
Referees: Ed Rush, Darell Garretson

May 15

Boxscore

Los Angeles Lakers 128, San Antonio Spurs 123
Scoring by quarter: 36–27, 30–37, 30–31, 32–28
Pts: Norm Nixon 30; Rebs: M. Johnson, Abdul-Jabbar 9 each Asts: Norm Nixon 10	Pts: George Gervin 38; Rebs: Mike Mitchell 10; Asts: Johnny Moore 10
Los Angeles wins series, 4–0

HemisFair Arena, San Antonio, Texas
Attendance: 15,800
Referees: Earl Strom, Hugh Evans, John Vanak

Regular-season series
San Antonio won 3–2 in the regular-season series

November 10, 1981

Recap

Los Angeles Lakers 102, San Antonio Spurs 128

HemisFair Arena, San Antonio

November 20, 1981

Recap

San Antonio Spurs 116, Los Angeles Lakers 136

The Forum, Inglewood, California

November 25, 1981

Recap

Los Angeles Lakers 117, San Antonio Spurs 96

HemisFair Arena, San Antonio

February 12, 1982

Recap

San Antonio Spurs 100, Los Angeles Lakers 94

The Forum, Inglewood, California

March 26, 1982

Recap

Los Angeles Lakers 105, San Antonio Spurs 110

HemisFair Arena, San Antonio

This was the first playoff meeting between the Lakers and the Spurs.

== NBA Finals: (E3) Philadelphia 76ers vs. (W1) Los Angeles Lakers ==
May 27

Boxscore

Los Angeles Lakers 124, Philadelphia 76ers 117
Scoring by quarter: 30–32, 20–29, 41–28, 33–28
Pts: Nixon, Wilkes 24 each Rebs: Magic Johnson 14; Asts: Norm Nixon 10	Pts: Julius Erving 27; Rebs: Caldwell Jones 11; Asts: Cheeks, Toney 9 each
Los Angeles leads series, 1–0

Spectrum, Philadelphia, Pennsylvania
Attendance: 18,364
Referees: Jake O'Donnell, Hugh Evans

May 30

Boxscore

Los Angeles Lakers 94, Philadelphia 76ers 110
Scoring by quarter: 26–34, 21–23, 29–31, 18–22
Pts: Kareem Abdul-Jabbar 23; Rebs: Magic Johnson 11; Asts: Norm Nixon 10	Pts: Julius Erving 24; Rebs: Julius Erving 14; Asts: Andrew Toney 11
Series tied, 1–1

Spectrum, Philadelphia, Pennsylvania
Attendance: 18,364
Referees: Darell Garretson, Earl Strom

June 1

Boxscore

Philadelphia 76ers 108, Los Angeles Lakers 129
Scoring by quarter: 20–32, 28–28, 22–31, 38–38
Pts: Andrew Toney 36; Rebs: Darryl Dawkins 13; Asts: Maurice Cheeks 9	Pts: Norm Nixon 29; Rebs: Magic Johnson 9 Asts: Magic Johnson 8
Los Angeles leads series, 2–1

The Forum, Inglewood, California
Attendance: 17,505
Referees: Ed Rush, Wally Rooney

June 3

Boxscore

Philadelphia 76ers 101, Los Angeles Lakers 111
Scoring by quarter: 18–29, 24–28, 30–30, 29–24
Pts: Andrew Toney 28; Rebs: Bobby Jones 9 Asts: Andrew Toney 11	Pts: Johnson, Wilkes 24 each Rebs: Abdul-Jabbar, Rambis 11 each Asts: Norm Nixon 14
Los Angeles leads series, 3–1

The Forum, Inglewood, California
Attendance: 17,505
Referees: Jack Madden, Paul Mihalak

June 6

Boxscore

Los Angeles Lakers 102, Philadelphia 76ers 135
Scoring by quarter: 20–20, 34–34, 27–37, 21–44
Pts: Bob McAdoo 23; Rebs: Magic Johnson 10; Asts: Norm Nixon 13	Pts: Andrew Toney 31; Rebs: Julius Erving 12; Asts: Toney, Cheeks 8 each
Los Angeles leads series, 3–2

Spectrum, Philadelphia, Pennsylvania
Attendance: 18,364
Referees: Jake O'Donnell, Ed Rush

June 8

Boxscore

Philadelphia 76ers 104, Los Angeles Lakers 114
Scoring by quarter: 26–30, 31–36, 22–20, 25–28
Pts: Julius Erving 30; Rebs: Caldwell Jones 9 Asts: Maurice Cheeks 9	Pts: Jamaal Wilkes 27; Rebs: Magic Johnson 13; Asts: Magic Johnson 13
Los Angeles wins series, 4–2

The Forum, Inglewood, California
Attendance: 17,505
Referees: Darell Garretson, Jack Madden

Regular-season series
Tied 1–1 in the regular-season series

February 26, 1982

Recap

Philadelphia 76ers 114, Los Angeles Lakers 116 (2OT)

The Forum, Inglewood, California

March 7, 1982

Recap

Los Angeles Lakers 113, Philadelphia 76ers 119

Spectrum, Philadelphia

This was the fourth playoff meeting between these two teams, with the Lakers winning the first three meetings.

Previous playoff series
Los Angeles leads 3–0 in all-time playoff series

1950

Minneapolis Lakers 4, Syracuse Nationals 2

1950 NBA Finals

1954

Minneapolis Lakers 4, Syracuse Nationals 3

1954 NBA Finals

1980

Los Angeles Lakers 4, Philadelphia 76ers 2

1980 NBA Finals
