= 1981–82 Denver Nuggets season =

NBA professional basketball team season

- Head coach: Doug Moe
- Arena: McNichols Sports Arena

Results
- Record: 46–36 (.561)
- Place: Division: 2nd (Midwest); Conference: 4th (Western)
- Playoff finish: West First Round (lost to Suns 1–2)
- Stats at Basketball Reference

Local media
- Television: KWGN
- Radio: KOA

The 1981–82 Denver Nuggets season was their 15th season, and their sixth in the NBA. During the 1981–82 season, they scored at least 100 points in every game and allowed at least 100 points in every game. They returned to the postseason for the first time since the 1978–79 season.

In the playoffs, the Nuggets lost to the Phoenix Suns in three games in the First Round.

== Draft picks ==
| Round | Pick | Player | Position | Nationality | School/Club team |
|---|---|---|---|---|---|
| 2 | 34 | Ken Green | Power forward | United States | Texas-Pan American |
| 5 | 101 | Willie Sims | Guard | United States | LSU |
| 6 | 124 | Alonzo Weatherly | Power forward | United States | University of Denver |
| 7 | 147 | Greg Manning | Shooting guard | United States | Maryland |
| 8 | 169 | Curtis Redding | | United States | St. John's |
| 9 | 191 | Andrew Burton | Guard | United States | Austin Peay |
| 10 | 211 | Derrick Rowland | Guard | United States | Potsdam State |

== Roster ==
1981–82 Denver Nuggets roster
Players

| Pos. | No. | Player | Height | Weight | DOB | From |
|---|---|---|---|---|---|---|
| SG | 23 | T.R. Dunn | 6 ft 4 in (1.93 m) | 192 lb (87 kg) | | Alabama |
| SF | 2 | Alex English | 6 ft 7 in (2.01 m) | 190 lb (86 kg) | | South Carolina |
| F | 22 | Glen Gondrezick | 6 ft 6 in (1.98 m) | 218 lb (99 kg) | | UNLV |
| G | 1 | Kenny Higgs | 6 ft 0 in (1.83 m) | 180 lb (82 kg) | | LSU |
| F | 34 | Cedrick Hordges | 6 ft 8 in (2.03 m) | 280 lb (127 kg) | | South Carolina |
| C | 44 | Dan Issel | 6 ft 9 in (2.06 m) | 235 lb (107 kg) | | Kentucky |
| G | 7 | Billy McKinney | 6 ft 0 in (1.83 m) | 170 lb (77 kg) | | Northwestern |
| F | 43 | James Ray | 6 ft 8 in (2.03 m) | 215 lb (98 kg) | | Jacksonville |
| C | 25 | Dave Robisch | 6 ft 10 in (2.08 m) | 235 lb (107 kg) | | Kansas |
| G | 10 | John Roche | 6 ft 3 in (1.91 m) | 170 lb (77 kg) | | South Carolina |
| SF | 33 | David Thompson | 6 ft 4 in (1.93 m) | 195 lb (88 kg) | | NC State |
| PF | 55 | Kiki Vandeweghe | 6 ft 8 in (2.03 m) | 220 lb (100 kg) | | UCLA |

Coaches
Head coach
- (United States) Doug Moe

Legend
- (DP) Unsigned draft pick
- (FA) Free agent
- (S) Suspended
- Injured

== Regular season ==
=== Season standings ===
| Midwest Division | W | L | PCT | GB | Home | Road | Div |
|---|---|---|---|---|---|---|---|
| y-San Antonio Spurs | 48 | 34 | .585 | – | 29–12 | 19–22 | 20–10 |
| x-Denver Nuggets | 46 | 36 | .561 | 2.0 | 29–12 | 17–24 | 19–11 |
| x-Houston Rockets | 46 | 36 | .561 | 2.0 | 25–16 | 21–20 | 17–13 |
| Kansas City Kings | 30 | 52 | .366 | 18.0 | 23–18 | 7–34 | 11–19 |
| Dallas Mavericks | 28 | 54 | .341 | 20.0 | 16–25 | 12–29 | 11–19 |
| Utah Jazz | 25 | 57 | .305 | 23.0 | 18–23 | 7–34 | 9–21 |

| # | Western Conference | | | | |
| # | Team | W | L | PCT | GB |
|---|---|---|---|---|---|
| 1 | c-Los Angeles Lakers | 57 | 25 | .695 | – |
| 2 | y-San Antonio Spurs | 48 | 34 | .585 | 9 |
| 3 | x-Seattle SuperSonics | 52 | 30 | .634 | 5 |
| 4 | x-Denver Nuggets | 46 | 36 | .561 | 11 |
| 5 | x-Phoenix Suns | 46 | 36 | .561 | 11 |
| 6 | x-Houston Rockets | 46 | 36 | .561 | 11 |
| 7 | Golden State Warriors | 45 | 37 | .549 | 12 |
| 8 | Portland Trail Blazers | 42 | 40 | .512 | 15 |
| 9 | Kansas City Kings | 30 | 52 | .366 | 27 |
| 10 | Dallas Mavericks | 28 | 54 | .341 | 29 |
| 11 | Utah Jazz | 25 | 57 | .305 | 32 |
| 12 | San Diego Clippers | 17 | 65 | .207 | 40 |

Notes

- z, y – division champions
- x – clinched playoff spot

== Game log ==
=== Regular season ===
1981–82 game log
Total: 46–36 (home: 29–12; road: 17–24)
October: 1–1 (home: 1–0; road: 0–1)

| Game | Date | Team | Score | High points | High rebounds | High assists | Location Attendance | Record |
|---|---|---|---|---|---|---|---|---|
| 1 | October 30 | Golden State | W 134–121 | | | | McNichols Sports Arena | 1–0 |
| 2 | October 31 | @ San Antonio | L 120–145 | | | | HemisFair Arena | 1–1 |

November: 7–4 (home: 5–1; road: 2–3)

| Game | Date | Team | Score | High points | High rebounds | High assists | Location Attendance | Record |
|---|---|---|---|---|---|---|---|---|
| 3 | November 4 | Houston | W 112–100 | | | | McNichols Sports Arena | 2–1 |
| 4 | November 6 | @ Seattle | W 109–105 | | | | Kingdome | 3–1 |
| 5 | November 7 | @ Golden State | L 107–152 | | | | Oakland–Alameda County Coliseum Arena | 3–2 |
| 6 | November 8 | @ Portland | L 116–120 | | | | Memorial Coliseum | 3–3 |
| 7 | November 10 | Phoenix | L 106–109 | | | | McNichols Sports Arena | 3–4 |
| 8 | November 13 | @ Utah | L 124–131 | | | | Salt Palace Acord Arena | 3–5 |
| 9 | November 18 | San Diego | W 133–128 | | | | McNichols Sports Arena | 4–5 |
| 10 | November 21 | Kansas City | W 128–121 | | | | McNichols Sports Arena | 5–5 |
| 11 | November 25 | Dallas | W 139–133 | | | | McNichols Sports Arena | 6–5 |
| 12 | November 27 | @ Kansas City | W 123–115 | | | | Kemper Arena | 7–5 |
| 13 | November 28 | Utah | W 131–124 (OT) | | | | McNichols Sports Arena | 8–5 |

December: 6–10 (home: 3–4; road: 3–6)

| Game | Date | Team | Score | High points | High rebounds | High assists | Location Attendance | Record |
|---|---|---|---|---|---|---|---|---|
| 14 | December 1 | Portland | L 113–121 | | | | McNichols Sports Arena | 8–6 |
| 15 | December 3 | @ Phoenix | L 109–137 | | | | Arizona Veterans Memorial Coliseum | 8–7 |
| 16 | December 4 | Los Angeles | L 117–126 | | | | McNichols Sports Arena | 8–8 |
| 17 | December 5 | @ Dallas | L 105–109 | | | | Reunion Arena | 8–9 |
| 18 | December 8 | @ New York | L 122–135 | | | | Madison Square Garden | 8–10 |
| 19 | December 9 | @ Philadelphia | L 109–137 | | | | The Spectrum | 8–11 |
| 20 | December 11 | @ New Jersey | L 123–131 | | | | Brendan Byrne Arena | 8–12 |
| 21 | December 12 | @ Cleveland | W 120–115 | | | | Richfield Coliseum | 9–12 |
| 22 | December 15 | Seattle | L 120–126 | | | | McNichols Sports Arena | 9–13 |
| 23 | December 17 | Atlanta | W 138–103 | | | | McNichols Sports Arena | 10–13 |
| 24 | December 19 | San Antonio | W 138–125 | | | | McNichols Sports Arena | 11–13 |
| 25 | December 22 | @ Houston | W 121–109 | | | | The Summit | 12–13 |
| 26 | December 23 | Detroit | L 119–124 | | | | McNichols Sports Arena | 12–14 |
| 27 | December 26 | @ Dallas | W 124–117 | | | | Reunion Arena | 13–14 |
| 28 | December 29 | Boston | W 128–123 | | | | McNichols Sports Arena | 14–14 |
| 29 | December 30 | @ Kansas City | L 116–120 | | | | Kemper Arena | 14–15 |

January: 9–5 (home: 5–2; road: 4–3)

| Game | Date | Team | Score | High points | High rebounds | High assists | Location Attendance | Record |
|---|---|---|---|---|---|---|---|---|
| 30 | January 2 | @ San Antonio | L 133–148 | | | | HemisFair Arena | 14–16 |
| 31 | January 3 | @ Milwaukee | W 128–122 | | | | MECCA Arena | 15–16 |
| 32 | January 5 | @ Chicago | L 128–134 | | | | Chicago Stadium | 15–17 |
| 33 | January 6 | San Diego | W 136–114 | | | | McNichols Sports Arena | 16–17 |
| 34 | January 8 | @ Portland | W 124–121 | | | | Memorial Coliseum | 17–17 |
| 35 | January 9 | Seattle | L 110–125 | | | | McNichols Sports Arena | 17–18 |
| 36 | January 12 | Kansas City | W 139–126 | | | | McNichols Sports Arena | 18–18 |
| 37 | January 13 | @ Golden State | L 128–143 | | | | Oakland–Alameda County Coliseum Arena | 18–19 |
| 38 | January 15 | Dallas | W 128–113 | | | | McNichols Sports Arena | 19–19 |
| 39 | January 17 | @ San Diego | W 138–131 | | | | San Diego Sports Arena | 20–19 |
| 40 | January 19 | Los Angeles | W 140–139 | | | | McNichols Sports Arena | 21–19 |
| 41 | January 22 | Milwaukee | L 125–131 | | | | McNichols Sports Arena | 21–20 |
| 42 | January 23 | @ Houston | W 111–109 | | | | The Summit | 22–20 |
| 43 | January 27 | New Jersey | W 130–116 | | | | McNichols Sports Arena | 23–20 |
All-Star Break

February: 6–8 (home: 4–4; road: 2–4)

| Game | Date | Team | Score | High points | High rebounds | High assists | Location Attendance | Record |
|---|---|---|---|---|---|---|---|---|
| 44 | February 2 | New York | W 128–117 | | | | McNichols Sports Arena | 24–20 |
| 45 | February 4 | @ Indiana | L 114–131 | | | | Market Square Arena | 24–21 |
| 46 | February 5 | @ Boston | L 144–145 | | | | Boston Garden | 24–22 |
| 47 | February 7 | @ Washington | W 124–115 | | | | Capital Centre | 25–22 |
| 48 | February 10 | Utah | L 148–151 | | | | McNichols Sports Arena | 25–23 |
| 49 | February 13 | San Diego | W 146–129 | | | | McNichols Sports Arena | 26–23 |
| 50 | February 15 | @ Utah | W 145–134 | | | | Salt Palace Acord Arena | 27–23 |
| 51 | February 16 | Kansas City | W 119–106 | | | | McNichols Sports Arena | 28–23 |
| 52 | February 19 | San Antonio | L 121–126 | | | | McNichols Sports Arena | 28–24 |
| 53 | February 21 | Los Angeles | L 131–132 | | | | McNichols Sports Arena | 28–25 |
| 54 | February 23 | @ Los Angeles | L 129–145 | | | | The Forum | 28–26 |
| 55 | February 24 | Houston | L 110–120 | | | | McNichols Sports Arena | 28–27 |
| 56 | February 26 | @ Phoenix | L 122–131 | | | | Arizona Veterans Memorial Coliseum | 28–28 |
| 57 | February 27 | Philadelphia | W 134–125 | | | | McNichols Sports Arena | 29–28 |

March: 13–2 (home: 8–1; road: 5–1)

| Game | Date | Team | Score | High points | High rebounds | High assists | Location Attendance | Record |
|---|---|---|---|---|---|---|---|---|
| 58 | March 2 | Indiana | L 124–132 (OT) | | | | McNichols Sports Arena | 29–29 |
| 59 | March 5 | Washington | W 127–126 | | | | McNichols Sports Arena | 30–29 |
| 60 | March 7 | Cleveland | W 147–127 | | | | McNichols Sports Arena | 31–29 |
| 61 | March 9 | @ Atlanta | L 106–120 | | | | The Omni | 31–30 |
| 62 | March 10 | @ Detroit | W 124–113 | | | | Pontiac Silverdome | 32–30 |
| 63 | March 12 | @ Houston | W 130–115 | | | | The Summit | 33–30 |
| 64 | March 14 | Golden State | W 127–101 | | | | McNichols Sports Arena | 34–30 |
| 65 | March 16 | Utah | W 154–138 | | | | McNichols Sports Arena | 35–30 |
| 66 | March 17 | @ Phoenix | W 135–133 (OT) | | | | Arizona Veterans Memorial Coliseum | 36–30 |
| 67 | March 19 | Chicago | W 130–120 | | | | McNichols Sports Arena | 37–30 |
| 68 | March 24 | San Antonio | W 129–115 | | | | McNichols Sports Arena | 38–30 |
| 69 | March 25 | @ San Diego | W 129–117 | | | | San Diego Sports Arena | 39–30 |
| 70 | March 27 | Phoenix | W 140–134 (2OT) | | | | McNichols Sports Arena | 40–30 |
| 71 | March 30 | Seattle | W 145–142 (OT) | | | | McNichols Sports Arena | 41–30 |
| 72 | March 31 | @ Dallas | W 120–119 | | | | Reunion Arena | 42–30 |

April: 4–6 (home: 3–0; road: 1–6)

| Game | Date | Team | Score | High points | High rebounds | High assists | Location Attendance | Record |
|---|---|---|---|---|---|---|---|---|
| 73 | April 2 | Portland | W 127–121 | | | | McNichols Sports Arena | 43–30 |
| 74 | April 4 | @ Seattle | L 116–140 | | | | Kingdome | 43–31 |
| 75 | April 6 | @ Portland | L 122–136 | | | | Memorial Coliseum | 43–32 |
| 76 | April 7 | @ Golden State | W 129–121 | | | | Oakland–Alameda County Coliseum Arena | 44–32 |
| 77 | April 9 | @ Los Angeles | L 128–153 | | | | The Forum | 44–33 |
| 78 | April 10 | @ Utah | L 136–151 | | | | Salt Palace Acord Arena | 44–34 |
| 79 | April 13 | @ San Antonio | L 137–144 | | | | HemisFair Arena | 44–35 |
| 80 | April 14 | Houston | W 141–122 | | | | McNichols Sports Arena | 45–35 |
| 81 | April 16 | @ Kansas City | L 121–123 | | | | Kemper Arena | 45–36 |
| 82 | April 17 | Dallas | W 130–124 | | | | McNichols Sports Arena | 46–36 |

1981–82 schedule

== Playoffs ==
1982 playoff game log
Western Conference First Round: 1–2 (home: 0–1; road: 1–1)

| Game | Date | Team | Score | High points | High rebounds | High assists | Location Attendance | Series |
|---|---|---|---|---|---|---|---|---|
| 1 | April 20 | Phoenix | W 129–113 | VanDeWeghe (29) | English (10) | English, McKinney (5) | McNichols Sports Arena; 17,298 | 1–0 |
| 2 | April 23 | @ Phoenix | L 110–126 | Issel (26) | English (6) | English, Gondrezick (5) | Arizona Veterans Memorial Coliseum; 12,798 | 1–1 |
| 3 | April 24 | Phoenix | L 119–124 | Issel (26) | Dunn. Issel (10) | English (7) | McNichols Sports Arena; 17,443 | 1–2 |

1982 schedule

== See also ==
- 1981-82 NBA season
