= 1981–82 Portland Trail Blazers season =

NBA professional basketball team season

- Head coach: Jack Ramsay
- General manager: Stu Inman
- Owner: Larry Weinberg
- Arena: Memorial Coliseum

Results
- Record: 42–40 (.512)
- Place: Division: 5th (Pacific); Conference: 8th (Western)
- Playoff finish: Did not qualify
- Stats at Basketball Reference

The 1981–82 Portland Trail Blazers season was the 12th season of the Portland Trail Blazers in the National Basketball Association (NBA). The Blazers finished 42–40, dropping three games more than in the previous season.

Portland finished eighth in the Western Conference; as only six teams qualified in each conference for the 1982 NBA Playoffs, the Blazers did not participate in the postseason. This would be the only year the Blazers missed the playoffs between their championship season of 1976–77 and 2002–03.

== Draft picks ==
Note: This is not a complete list; only the first two rounds are covered, as well as any other picks by the franchise who played at least one NBA game.

Round	Pick	Player	Position	Nationality	School/Club team
1	15	Jeff Lamp	G/F	United States	Virginia
1	16	Darnell Valentine	G	United States	Kansas
2	26	Brian Jackson	F	United States	Utah State
3	61	Pétur Guðmundsson	F/C	Iceland	Washington
4	85	Peter Verhoeven	F	United States	Fresno State

== Roster ==
1981–82 Portland Trail Blazers roster
Players

Pos.	No.	Player	Height	Weight	DOB	From
G	12	Billy Ray Bates	6 ft 4 in (1.93 m)	210 lb (95 kg)	1956–05–31	Kentucky State
F	30	Bob Gross	6 ft 6 in (1.98 m)	200 lb (91 kg)	1953–08–03	Long Beach State
C	40	Pétur Guðmundsson	7 ft 2 in (2.18 m)	260 lb (118 kg)	1958–10–30	Washington
F	32	Mike Harper	6 ft 10 in (2.08 m)	195 lb (88 kg)	1957–12–09	North Park
C	44	Kevin Kunnert	6 ft 9 in (2.06 m)	230 lb (104 kg)	1951–11–11	Iowa
F	3	Jeff Lamp	6 ft 6 in (1.98 m)	195 lb (88 kg)	1959–03–09	Virginia
SF	33	Calvin Natt	6 ft 6 in (1.98 m)	220 lb (100 kg)	1957–01–08	Louisiana–Monroe
G	4	Jim Paxson	6 ft 6 in (1.98 m)	200 lb (91 kg)	1957–07–09	Dayton
PG	14	Kelvin Ransey	6 ft 1 in (1.85 m)	170 lb (77 kg)	1958–05–03	Ohio State
F/C	43	Mychal Thompson	6 ft 10 in (2.08 m)	226 lb (103 kg)	1955–01–30	Minnesota
G	10	Darnell Valentine	6 ft 1 in (1.85 m)	183 lb (83 kg)	1959–02–03	Kansas
F	31	Pete Verhoeven	6 ft 9 in (2.06 m)	215 lb (98 kg)	1959–02–15	Fresno State
F	42	Kermit Washington (injured)	6 ft 8 in (2.03 m)	230 lb (104 kg)	1951–09–17	American

Coaches
Head coach
- Jack Ramsay
Assistant(s)
- Bucky Buckwalter
- Jim Lynam

Legend
- (DP) Unsigned draft pick
- (FA) Free agent
- (S) Suspended
- Injured

== Regular season ==
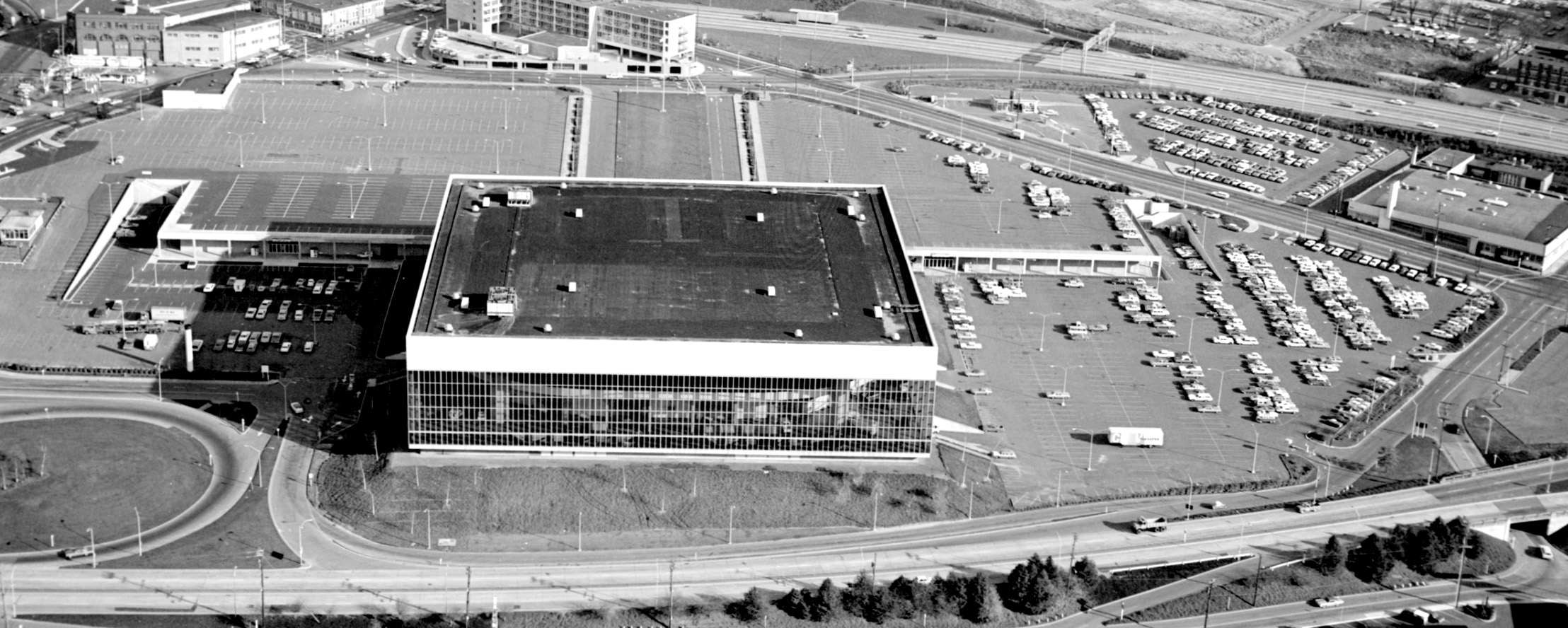
The Trail Blazers played their home games at Veterans Memorial Coliseum.

=== Season standings ===
Pacific Division	W	L	PCT	GB	Home	Road	Div
y-Los Angeles Lakers	57	25	.695	–	30–11	27–14	21–9
x-Seattle SuperSonics	52	30	.634	5.0	31–10	21–20	18–12
x-Phoenix Suns	46	36	.561	11.0	31–10	15–26	14–16
Golden State Warriors	45	37	.549	12.0	28–13	17–24	15–15
Portland Trail Blazers	42	40	.512	15.0	27–14	15–26	15–15
San Diego Clippers	17	65	.207	40.0	11–30	6–35	7–23

#	Western Conference				
#	Team	W	L	PCT	GB
1	c-Los Angeles Lakers	57	25	.695	–
2	y-San Antonio Spurs	48	34	.585	9
3	x-Seattle SuperSonics	52	30	.634	5
4	x-Denver Nuggets	46	36	.561	11
5	x-Phoenix Suns	46	36	.561	11
6	x-Houston Rockets	46	36	.561	11
7	Golden State Warriors	45	37	.549	12
8	Portland Trail Blazers	42	40	.512	15
9	Kansas City Kings	30	52	.366	27
10	Dallas Mavericks	28	54	.341	29
11	Utah Jazz	25	57	.305	32
12	San Diego Clippers	17	65	.207	40

z - clinched division title
y - clinched division title
x - clinched playoff spot

== Game log ==
=== Regular season ===
1981–82 game log
Total: 42–40 (Home: 27–14; Road: 15–26)
October: 1–0 (home: 1–0; road: 0–0)

Game	Date	Team	Score	High points	High rebounds	High assists	Location Attendance	Record
1	October 30	Phoenix	W 103–95				Memorial Coliseum	1–0

November: 9–4 (home: 7–1; road: 2–3)

Game	Date	Team	Score	High points	High rebounds	High assists	Location Attendance	Record
2	November 1	Seattle	W 104–94				Memorial Coliseum	2–0
3	November 3	Los Angeles	W 102–100				Memorial Coliseum	3–0
4	November 4	@ Golden State	W 109–108				Oakland–Alameda County Coliseum Arena	4–0
5	November 6	Utah	W 119–109				Memorial Coliseum	5–0
6	November 8	Denver	W 120–116				Memorial Coliseum	6–0
7	November 10	Dallas	W 117–95				Memorial Coliseum	7–0
8	November 12	@ San Diego	L 115–122				San Diego Sports Arena	7–1
9	November 13	@ Los Angeles	L 115–119				The Forum	7–2
10	November 15	San Antonio	L 105–110				Memorial Coliseum	7–3
11	November 20	New Jersey	W 106–86				Memorial Coliseum	8–3
12	November 25	@ Seattle	L 103–110				Kingdome	8–4
13	November 27	@ Utah	W 103–93				Salt Palace Acord Arena	9–4
14	November 29	Chicago	W 114–109				Memorial Coliseum	10–4

December: 6–8 (home: 3–2; road: 3–6)

Game	Date	Team	Score	High points	High rebounds	High assists	Location Attendance	Record
15	December 1	@ Denver	W 121–113				McNichols Sports Arena	11–4
16	December 2	@ Kansas City	W 112–107				Kemper Arena	12–4
17	December 4	@ San Antonio	L 111–127				HemisFair Arena	12–5
18	December 5	@ Houston	L 98–110				The Summit	12–6
19	December 8	Golden State	L 108–122				Memorial Coliseum	12–7
20	December 10	@ Phoenix	L 110–117				Arizona Veterans Memorial Coliseum	12–8
21	December 11	@ Los Angeles	L 116–124				The Forum	12–9
22	December 13	Detroit	W 105–99				Memorial Coliseum	13–9
23	December 15	San Diego	W 118–101				Memorial Coliseum	14–9
24	December 19	@ Dallas	L 95–102				Reunion Arena	14–10
25	December 22	Los Angeles	L 110–124				Memorial Coliseum	14–11
26	December 25	Seattle	W 99–94				Memorial Coliseum	15–11
27	December 26	@ San Diego	W 128–116				San Diego Sports Arena	16–11
28	December 30	@ Phoenix	L 112–113				Arizona Veterans Memorial Coliseum	16–12

January: 7–6 (home: 4–3; road: 3–3)

Game	Date	Team	Score	High points	High rebounds	High assists	Location Attendance	Record
29	January 1	Philadelphia	L 105–120				Memorial Coliseum	16–13
30	January 3	Kansas City	W 127–116 (OT)				Memorial Coliseum	17–13
31	January 5	San Antonio	W 115–110				Memorial Coliseum	18–13
32	January 8	Denver	L 121–124				Memorial Coliseum	18–14
33	January 10	Houston	L 109–111				Memorial Coliseum	18–15
34	January 12	Indiana	W 105–93				Memorial Coliseum	19–15
35	January 14	@ Houston	W 111–100				The Summit	20–15
36	January 16	@ Dallas	W 110–103				Reunion Arena	21–15
37	January 19	@ Atlanta	L 101–112				The Omni	21–16
38	January 20	@ Philadelphia	L 110–115				The Spectrum	21–17
39	January 22	@ Washington	L 97–110				Capital Centre	21–18
40	January 24	@ Boston	W 123–119				Boston Garden	22–18
41	January 28	San Diego	W 96–93				Memorial Coliseum	23–18

February: 6–9 (home: 3–3; road: 3–6)

Game	Date	Team	Score	High points	High rebounds	High assists	Location Attendance	Record
42	February 2	Kansas City	W 102–97				Memorial Coliseum	24–18
43	February 3	@ Utah	L 118–122				Salt Palace Acord Arena	24–19
44	February 5	Utah	W 121–100				Memorial Coliseum	25–19
45	February 7	New York	W 100–98				Memorial Coliseum	26–19
46	February 10	@ Cleveland	W 105–91				Richfield Coliseum	27–19
47	February 11	@ Milwaukee	L 105–116				MECCA Arena	27–20
48	February 13	@ Detroit	W 128–120				Pontiac Silverdome	28–20
49	February 14	@ Indiana	L 91–107				Market Square Arena	28–21
50	February 16	Washington	L 97–100				Memorial Coliseum	28–22
51	February 19	Boston	L 117–127				Memorial Coliseum	28–23
52	February 21	Atlanta	L 97–109				Memorial Coliseum	28–24
53	February 23	@ Chicago	L 122–123				Chicago Stadium	28–25
54	February 24	@ Kansas City	W 123–111				Kemper Arena	29–25
55	February 26	@ New Jersey	L 106–110				Brendan Byrne Arena	29–26
56	February 27	@ New York	L 105–107				Madison Square Garden	29–27

March: 7–8 (home: 4–4; road: 3–4)

Game	Date	Team	Score	High points	High rebounds	High assists	Location Attendance	Record
57	March 2	Phoenix	W 119–108 (OT)				Memorial Coliseum	30–27
58	March 5	Cleveland	L 110–111				Memorial Coliseum	30–28
59	March 7	@ Golden State	W 106–102				Oakland–Alameda County Coliseum Arena	31–28
60	March 10	@ Dallas	L 102–104				Reunion Arena	31–29
61	March 12	@ San Antonio	W 112–108				HemisFair Arena	32–29
62	March 13	@ Houston	L 107–112				The Summit	32–30
63	March 16	Los Angeles	L 108–120				Memorial Coliseum	32–31
64	March 18	Golden State	W 109–95				Memorial Coliseum	33–31
65	March 19	@ Utah	W 131–129 (OT)				Salt Palace Acord Arena	34–31
66	March 21	Dallas	W 109–101				Memorial Coliseum	35–31
67	March 23	Milwaukee	L 104–109				Memorial Coliseum	35–32
68	March 25	Houston	L 95–108				Memorial Coliseum	35–33
69	March 26	@ Golden State	L 89–102				Oakland–Alameda County Coliseum Arena	35–34
70	March 28	@ Seattle	L 101–109				Kingdome	35–35
71	March 30	Kansas City	W 109–99				Memorial Coliseum	36–35

April: 6–5 (home: 5–1; road: 1–4)

Game	Date	Team	Score	High points	High rebounds	High assists	Location Attendance	Record
72	April 1	San Antonio	W 109–105				Memorial Coliseum	37–35
73	April 2	@ Denver	L 121–127				McNichols Sports Arena	37–36
74	April 4	@ Los Angeles	L 111–129				The Forum	37–37
75	April 6	Denver	W 136–122				Memorial Coliseum	38–37
76	April 8	@ Phoenix	W 106–104				Arizona Veterans Memorial Coliseum	39–37
77	April 9	San Diego	W 124–104				Memorial Coliseum	40–37
78	April 11	Golden State	W 116–106 (OT)				Memorial Coliseum	41–37
79	April 13	@ Seattle	L 86–88				Kingdome	41–38
80	April 15	@ San Diego	L 123–129				San Diego Sports Arena	41–39
81	April 16	Phoenix	L 99–113				Memorial Coliseum	41–40
82	April 18	Seattle	W 119–114				Memorial Coliseum	42–40

1981–82 schedule
