= 1981–82 Seattle SuperSonics season =

NBA professional basketball team season

- Head coach: Lenny Wilkens
- General manager: Zollie Volchok
- Owner: Sam Schulman
- Arena: Kingdome; Seattle Center Coliseum (Playoffs)

Results
- Record: 52–30 (.634)
- Place: Division: 2nd (Pacific); Conference: 2nd (Western)
- Playoff finish: Conference Semi-finals (lost to Spurs 1–4)
- Stats at Basketball Reference

Local media
- Television: KIRO-TV
- Radio: KIRO

The 1981–82 Seattle SuperSonics season was the SuperSonics' 15th season in the NBA.

In the playoffs, the SuperSonics defeated the Houston Rockets in three games in the First Round, before losing to the San Antonio Spurs in five games in the Semi-finals.

== Offseason ==
=== Draft ===
| Round | Pick | Player | Position | Nationality | College |
|---|---|---|---|---|---|
| 1 | 5 | Danny Vranes | SF | United States | Utah |
| 3 | 53 | Mark Radford | SG | United States | Oregon State |
| 5 | 99 | Andra Griffin | F | United States | Washington |
| 6 | 122 | Earl Banks | F | United States | Auburn |
| 7 | 145 | Tom Sienkiewicz | G | United States | Villanova |

== Roster ==
1981–82 Seattle SuperSonics roster
Players

| Pos. | No. | Player | Height | Weight | DOB | From |
|---|---|---|---|---|---|---|
| SG | 32 | Fred Brown | 6 ft 3 in (1.91 m) | 182 lb (83 kg) | 1948-08-07 | Iowa |
| C | 40 | James Donaldson | 7 ft 2 in (2.18 m) | 275 lb (125 kg) | 1957-08-16 | Washington State |
| SF | 22 | Bill Hanzlik | 6 ft 7 in (2.01 m) | 185 lb (84 kg) | 1957-12-06 | Notre Dame |
| SF | 27 | John Johnson | 6 ft 7 in (2.01 m) | 200 lb (91 kg) | 1947-10-18 | Iowa |
| SF | 3 | Greg Kelser | 6 ft 7 in (2.01 m) | 205 lb (93 kg) | 1957-09-17 | Michigan State |
| SG | 30 | Mark Radford | 6 ft 4 in (1.93 m) | 190 lb (86 kg) | 1959-07-05 | Oregon State |
| PF | 8 | Lonnie Shelton | 6 ft 8 in (2.03 m) | 240 lb (109 kg) | 1955-10-19 | Oregon State |
| C | 43 | Jack Sikma | 6 ft 11 in (2.11 m) | 230 lb (104 kg) | 1955-11-14 | Illinois Wesleyan |
| SG | 20 | Phil Smith | 6 ft 4 in (1.93 m) | 185 lb (84 kg) | 1952-04-22 | San Francisco |
| PF | 33 | Ray Tolbert | 6 ft 9 in (2.06 m) | 225 lb (102 kg) | 1958-09-10 | Indiana |
| SF | 23 | Danny Vranes | 6 ft 7 in (2.01 m) | 210 lb (95 kg) | 1958-10-29 | Utah |
| SF | 42 | Wally Walker | 6 ft 7 in (2.01 m) | 190 lb (86 kg) | 1954-07-18 | Virginia |
| PG | 1 | Gus Williams | 6 ft 2 in (1.88 m) | 175 lb (79 kg) | 1953-10-10 | USC |

Coaches
Head coach
- Lenny Wilkens
Assistant(s)
- Les Habegger
- Dave Harshman

Legend
- (DP) Unsigned draft pick
- (FA) Free agent
- (S) Suspended
- Injured

Roster
Updated: February 16, 1982

== Regular season ==
=== Season standings ===
| Pacific Division | W | L | PCT | GB | Home | Road | Div |
|---|---|---|---|---|---|---|---|
| y-Los Angeles Lakers | 57 | 25 | .695 | – | 30–11 | 27–14 | 21–9 |
| x-Seattle SuperSonics | 52 | 30 | .634 | 5.0 | 31–10 | 21–20 | 18–12 |
| x-Phoenix Suns | 46 | 36 | .561 | 11.0 | 31–10 | 15–26 | 14–16 |
| Golden State Warriors | 45 | 37 | .549 | 12.0 | 28–13 | 17–24 | 15–15 |
| Portland Trail Blazers | 42 | 40 | .512 | 15.0 | 27–14 | 15–26 | 15–15 |
| San Diego Clippers | 17 | 65 | .207 | 40.0 | 11–30 | 6–35 | 7–23 |

| # | Western Conference | | | | |
| # | Team | W | L | PCT | GB |
|---|---|---|---|---|---|
| 1 | c-Los Angeles Lakers | 57 | 25 | .695 | – |
| 2 | y-San Antonio Spurs | 48 | 34 | .585 | 9 |
| 3 | x-Seattle SuperSonics | 52 | 30 | .634 | 5 |
| 4 | x-Denver Nuggets | 46 | 36 | .561 | 11 |
| 5 | x-Phoenix Suns | 46 | 36 | .561 | 11 |
| 6 | x-Houston Rockets | 46 | 36 | .561 | 11 |
| 7 | Golden State Warriors | 45 | 37 | .549 | 12 |
| 8 | Portland Trail Blazers | 42 | 40 | .512 | 15 |
| 9 | Kansas City Kings | 30 | 52 | .366 | 27 |
| 10 | Dallas Mavericks | 28 | 54 | .341 | 29 |
| 11 | Utah Jazz | 25 | 57 | .305 | 32 |
| 12 | San Diego Clippers | 17 | 65 | .207 | 40 |

== Game log ==
=== Regular season ===
| # | Date | Opponent | Score | High points | Record |
| 1 | October 31 | Phoenix | W 94–84 | Gus Williams (28) | 1–0 |
| 2 | November 1 | @ Portland | L 94–104 | Gus Williams (21) | 1–1 |
| 3 | November 4 | @ Los Angeles | L 103–106 | Gus Williams (29) | 1–2 |
| 4 | November 6 | Denver | L 105–109 | Wally Walker, Jack Sikma (20) | 1–3 |
| 5 | November 10 | @ Golden State | W 123–113 | Gus Williams (33) | 2–3 |
| 6 | November 11 | Dallas | W 107–79 | Lonnie Shelton (18) | 3–3 |
| 7 | November 13 | San Antonio | L 112–119 | Jack Sikma (39) | 3–4 |
| 8 | November 18 | @ San Antonio | L 93–111 | Lonnie Shelton, Jack Sikma (19) | 3–5 |
| 9 | November 20 | Dallas | W 90–89 | Gus Williams (22) | 4–5 |
| 10 | November 22 | New Jersey | W 109–92 | Lonnie Shelton (22) | 5–5 |
| 11 | November 25 | Portland | W 110–103 | Fred Brown (23) | 6–5 |
| 12 | November 27 | Houston | W 117–110 | Gus Williams (33) | 7–5 |
| 13 | November 28 | @ San Diego | L 120–122 | Jack Sikma (29) | 7–6 |
| 14 | December 1 | Chicago | W 103–87 | Gus Williams (25) | 8–6 |
| 15 | December 2 | Los Angeles | W 104–96 | Jack Sikma (27) | 9–6 |
| 16 | December 4 | @ Kansas City | L 109–112 | Jack Sikma (30) | 9–7 |
| 17 | December 5 | @ Atlanta | W 92–85 | Gus Williams (22) | 10–7 |
| 18 | December 8 | @ Houston | W 107–96 | Gus Williams (29) | 11–7 |
| 19 | December 9 | @ San Antonio | L 99–110 | Jack Sikma (28) | 11–8 |
| 20 | December 12 | Detroit | W 117–111 | Gus Williams (33) | 12–8 |
| 21 | December 13 | San Diego | W 98–74 | Gus Williams (18) | 13–8 |
| 22 | December 15 | Denver | W 126–120 | Gus Williams (33) | 14–8 |
| 23 | December 17 | @ San Diego | W 106–92 | Gus Williams (24) | 15–8 |
| 24 | December 19 | @ Utah | W 115–103 | Gus Williams (30) | 16–8 |
| 25 | December 23 | Utah | W 113–99 | Lonnie Shelton (27) | 17–8 |
| 26 | December 25 | @ Portland | L 94–99 | Gus Williams (25) | 17–9 |
| 27 | December 28 | Golden State | W 104–100 | Jack Sikma, Gus Williams (26) | 18–9 |
| 28 | December 30 | Philadelphia | L 99–102 | Gus Williams (31) | 18–10 |
| 29 | January 2 | @ Phoenix | L 97–120 | Gus Williams (22) | 18–11 |
| 30 | January 3 | @ Los Angeles | W 110–90 | Gus Williams (27) | 19–11 |
| 31 | January 6 | Dallas | W 107–100 | Jack Sikma (25) | 20–11 |
| 32 | January 7 | Houston | W 116–107 | Jack Sikma (25) | 21–11 |
| 33 | January 9 | @ Denver | W 125–110 | Gus Williams (39) | 22–11 |
| 34 | January 13 | Indiana | W 106–86 | Gus Williams (19) | 23–11 |
| 35 | January 15 | Utah | W 115–103 | Gus Williams (42) | 24–11 |
| 36 | January 17 | Golden State | W 122–97 | Lonnie Shelton (22) | 25–11 |
| 37 | January 19 | @ Cleveland | W 99–97 | Jack Sikma (28) | 26–11 |
| 38 | January 20 | @ Washington | L 95–106 | Jack Sikma, Gus Williams (21) | 26–12 |
| 39 | January 22 | @ Boston | W 118–106 | Lonnie Shelton (37) | 27–12 |
| 40 | January 23 | @ Philadelphia | L 87–100 | Jack Sikma (23) | 27–13 |
| 41 | January 25 | @ New York | W 113–99 | Gus Williams (25) | 28–13 |
| 42 | January 27 | @ Kansas City | W 110–103 | Gus Williams (31) | 29–13 |
| 43 | February 3 | Kansas City | W 97–87 | Gus Williams (28) | 30–13 |
| 44 | February 5 | @ Golden State | W 108–99 | Jack Sikma (30) | 31–13 |
| 45 | February 6 | Utah | W 129–103 | Jack Sikma (20) | 32–13 |
| 46 | February 7 | San Diego | W 99–97 | Gus Williams (21) | 33–13 |
| 47 | February 9 | New York | W 114–105 | Jack Sikma (25) | 34–13 |
| 48 | February 11 | @ Houston | L 100–117 | Sikma, Williams, Donaldson (16) | 34–14 |
| 49 | February 12 | @ Dallas | L 100–103 | Jack Sikma (30) | 34–15 |
| 50 | February 14 | @ San Antonio | L 94–114 | Jack Sikma (22) | 34–16 |
| 51 | February 16 | @ Los Angeles | L 101–108 | Gus Williams (30) | 34–17 |
| 52 | February 18 | Washington | W 105–87 | Gus Williams (26) | 35–17 |
| 53 | February 19 | Atlanta | L 122–127 (4OT) | Williams, Brown (24) | 35–18 |
| 54 | February 21 | Boston | W 103–100 | Gus Williams (34) | 36–18 |
| 55 | February 25 | Los Angeles | L 98–104 | Wally Walker (18) | 36–19 |
| 56 | February 26 | @ Utah | W 98–97 | Jack Sikma (24) | 37–19 |
| 57 | February 28 | Phoenix | L 98–103 | Jack Sikma (33) | 37–20 |
| 58 | March 3 | Cleveland | W 136–107 | Greg Kelser (19) | 38–20 |
| 59 | March 5 | Dallas | W 98–97 | Gus Williams (38) | 39–20 |
| 60 | March 7 | San Diego | W 144–106 | Gus Williams (30) | 40–20 |
| 61 | March 9 | @ Chicago | L 104–109 | Gus Williams (25) | 40–21 |
| 62 | March 12 | @ Milwaukee | W 112–110 | Gus Williams (30) | 41–21 |
| 63 | March 14 | @ New Jersey | W 98–97 | Gus Williams (23) | 42–21 |
| 64 | March 16 | @ Indiana | L 96–109 | Gus Williams (18) | 42–22 |
| 65 | March 18 | @ Detroit | L 115–119 | Gus Williams (33) | 42–23 |
| 66 | March 19 | @ Kansas City | W 109–103 | Gus Williams (27) | 43–23 |
| 67 | March 21 | @ Phoenix | W 115–105 | Gus Williams (41) | 44–23 |
| 68 | March 24 | Milwaukee | W 99–97 | Jack Sikma (22) | 45–23 |
| 69 | March 26 | Houston | L 97–99 | Gus Williams (26) | 45–24 |
| 70 | March 28 | Portland | W 109–101 | Jack Sikma (25) | 46–24 |
| 71 | March 30 | @ Denver | L 142–145 (OT) | Gus Williams (32) | 46–25 |
| 72 | March 31 | Kansas City | L 109–116 | Lonnie Shelton (23) | 46–26 |
| 73 | April 2 | San Antonio | W 111–86 | Gus Williams (33) | 47–26 |
| 74 | April 4 | Denver | W 140–116 | Jack Sikma (29) | 48–26 |
| 75 | April 6 | Phoenix | W 102–91 | Gus Williams (27) | 49–26 |
| 76 | April 8 | @ San Diego | W 117–115 (OT) | Gus Williams (41) | 50–26 |
| 77 | April 10 | @ Phoenix | L 99–116 | Gus Williams (21) | 50–27 |
| 78 | April 11 | @ Los Angeles | L 104–107 | Jack Sikma (26) | 50–28 |
| 79 | April 13 | Portland | W 88–86 | Jack Sikma (22) | 51–28 |
| 80 | April 14 | Golden State | L 93–104 | Gus Williams (23) | 51–29 |
| 81 | April 17 | @ Golden State | W 95–94 | Jack Sikma (28) | 52–29 |
| 82 | April 19 | @ Portland | L 114–119 | James Donaldson (23) | 52–30 |

=== Playoffs ===
1982 playoff game log
First round: 2–1 (home: 2–0; road: 0–1)

| Game | Date | Team | Score | High points | High rebounds | High assists | Location Attendance | Series |
|---|---|---|---|---|---|---|---|---|
| 1 | April 21 | Houston | W 102–87 | Gus Williams (27) | Jack Sikma (13) | Gus Williams (12) | Kingdome; 14,071 | 1–0 |
| 2 | April 23 | @ Houston | L 70–91 | Gus Williams (18) | Jack Sikma (11) | four players tied (3) | The Summit; 15,676 | 1–1 |
| 3 | April 25 | Houston | W 104–83 | Jack Sikma (30) | Jack Sikma (17) | Gus Williams (12) | Kingdome; 14,071 | 2–1 |

Conference Semi-finals: 1–4 (home: 1–2; road: 0–2)

| Game | Date | Team | Score | High points | High rebounds | High assists | Location Attendance | Series |
|---|---|---|---|---|---|---|---|---|
| 1 | April 27 | San Antonio | L 93–95 | Jack Sikma (26) | Jack Sikma (12) | Hanzlik, Brown (4) | Kingdome; 14,457 | 0–1 |
| 2 | April 28 | San Antonio | W 114–99 | Gus Williams (34) | G. Johnson, Corzine (8) | Gus Williams (9) | Kingdome; 19,403 | 1–1 |
| 3 | April 30 | @ San Antonio | L 97–99 | Gus Williams (25) | Jack Sikma (15) | Gus Williams (11) | HemisFair Arena; 14,019 | 1–2 |
| 4 | May 2 | @ San Antonio | L 113–115 | Gus Williams (33) | James Donaldson (16) | Gus Williams (7) | HemisFair Arena; 15,002 | 1–3 |
| 5 | May 5 | San Antonio | L 103–109 | Gus Williams (36) | Jack Sikma (11) | Gus Williams (9) | Kingdome; 23,180 | 1–4 |

1982 schedule

== Player statistics ==
Legend
| GP | Games played | RPG | Rebounds per game | BPG | Blocks per game |
| MIN | Minutes played | APG | Assists per game | TPG | Turnovers per game |
| PPG | Points per game | SPG | Steals per game | FPG | Field goals per game |

=== Season ===
Seattle SuperSonics Stats - 1981-82
| Player | GP | MIN | PPG | RPG | APG | SPG | BPG | TPG | FPG |
| Fred Brown | 82 | 21.8 | 11.2 | 1.7 | 2.9 | 0.8 | 0.0 | 1.2 | 4.8 |
| James Donaldson | 82 | 20.9 | 8.1 | 6.0 | 0.6 | 0.3 | 1.7 | 1.4 | 3.1 |
| Bill Hanzlik | 81 | 24.4 | 5.8 | 3.3 | 2.3 | 1.0 | 0.4 | 1.3 | 2.1 |
| Greg Kelser | 49 | 11.4 | 4.9 | 3.1 | 0.9 | 0.3 | 0.3 | 1.3 | 1.7 |
| John Johnson | 14 | 13.4 | 4.2 | 1.3 | 2.1 | 0.3 | 0.2 | 1.2 | 1.6 |
| Mark Radford | 43 | 8.6 | 3.4 | 0.7 | 1.3 | 0.4 | 0.0 | 1.0 | 1.3 |
| Lonnie Shelton | 81 | 32.9 | 14.9 | 6.3 | 3.1 | 1.2 | 0.5 | 2.5 | 6.3 |
| Jack Sikma | 82 | 37.2 | 19.6 | 12.7 | 3.4 | 1.2 | 1.3 | 2.6 | 7.1 |
| Phil Smith | 26 | 22.9 | 8.2 | 2.7 | 2.8 | 0.8 | 0.3 | 1.5 | 3.3 |
| Ray Tolbert | 52 | 9.5 | 3.4 | 1.9 | 0.5 | 0.2 | 0.3 | 0.6 | 1.5 |
| Danny Vranes | 77 | 14.0 | 4.9 | 2.6 | 0.7 | 0.4 | 0.3 | 0.9 | 1.9 |
| Wally Walker | 70 | 28.1 | 9.9 | 4.4 | 3.1 | 0.5 | 0.4 | 1.6 | 4.3 |
| Gus Williams | 80 | 36.0 | 23.4 | 3.1 | 6.9 | 2.2 | 0.5 | 2.5 | 9.7 |

=== Playoffs ===
Seattle SuperSonics Stats - 1981-82
| Player | GP | MIN | PPG | RPG | APG | SPG | BPG | TPG | FPG |
| Fred Brown | 8 | 19.8 | 11.9 | 1.9 | 2.3 | 0.6 | 0.0 | 1.1 | 5.4 |
| James Donaldson | 8 | 23.6 | 6.8 | 9.3 | 0.9 | 0.3 | 0.6 | 1.3 | 2.3 |
| Bill Hanzlik | 8 | 25.4 | 6.5 | 4.0 | 2.5 | 0.8 | 0.6 | 1.6 | 2.0 |
| Greg Kelser | 3 | 2.0 | 1.3 | 1.0 | 0.3 | 0.0 | 0.0 | 0.7 | 0.0 |
| John Johnson | 7 | 22.7 | 5.4 | 2.0 | 4.9 | 0.9 | 0.0 | 1.6 | 2.1 |
| Lonnie Shelton | 8 | 33.3 | 12.8 | 7.4 | 2.0 | 0.6 | 0.9 | 2.5 | 5.0 |
| Jack Sikma | 8 | 39.4 | 20.5 | 12.1 | 3.0 | 1.1 | 1.0 | 2.0 | 7.1 |
| Phil Smith | 8 | 11.5 | 3.1 | 1.0 | 0.9 | 0.6 | 0.1 | 0.5 | 1.5 |
| Ray Tolbert | 4 | 7.8 | 2.5 | 1.3 | 0.3 | 1.0 | 0.0 | 0.0 | 0.8 |
| Danny Vranes | 6 | 4.8 | 0.5 | 0.3 | 0.0 | 0.2 | 0.0 | 0.3 | 0.2 |
| Wally Walker | 8 | 19.6 | 4.9 | 4.0 | 1.9 | 0.5 | 0.5 | 0.9 | 2.4 |
| Gus Williams | 8 | 39.4 | 26.3 | 3.3 | 8.1 | 1.6 | 0.6 | 2.3 | 10.3 |

Notes:

- Mark Radford did not play due to injury.

== Awards and records ==
- Gus Williams, All-NBA First Team, NBA Comeback Player of the Year
- Lonnie Shelton, NBA All-Defensive Second Team
- Jack Sikma, NBA All-Defensive Second Team

== See also ==
- 1981-82 NBA season
