= 1981–82 Detroit Pistons season =

NBA team season

- Head coach: Scotty Robertson
- General manager: Jack McCloskey
- Owners: William Davidson
- Arena: Pontiac Silverdome

Results
- Record: 39–43 (.476)
- Place: Division: 3rd (Central); Conference: 7th (Eastern)
- Playoff finish: Did not qualify
- Stats at Basketball Reference

The 1981–82 Detroit Pistons season was the Detroit Pistons' 34th season in the NBA and 25th season in the city of Detroit. The team played in the Detroit suburbs at the Pontiac Silverdome.

The Pistons had the second pick in the 1981 NBA draft and chose Isiah Thomas from Indiana, adding a future Hall of Fame player for the centerpiece of the rebuilding franchise. The team finished greatly improved, 39-43 (.476), 3rd in the Central Division, an 18-game improvement from the previous season. The team was led by a pair of rookies, guard Thomas (17.0 ppg, 7.8 apg, NBA All-Star, NBA All Rookie Team) and forward Kelly Tripucka (21.6 ppg, NBA All-Star, NBA All Rookie Team), along with guard John Long (21.9 ppg). The team also picked up center Bill Laimbeer (12.8 ppg, 11.3 rpg) in a trade with Cleveland and guard Vinnie Johnson from Seattle (7.7 ppg), two key components of future championship Piston teams.

== Draft picks ==
Round	Pick	Player	Position	Nationality	College
1	2	Isiah Thomas	PG	United States	Indiana
1	12	Kelly Tripucka	SF/SG	United States	Notre Dame

== Roster ==
1981–82 Detroit Pistons roster
Players

Pos.	No.	Player	Height	Weight	DOB	From
C	54	Kent Benson	6 ft 10 in (2.08 m)	235 lb (107 kg)		Indiana
F	32	Kenny Carr	6 ft 7 in (2.01 m)	220 lb (100 kg)		NC State
SG	24	Alan Hardy	6 ft 7 in (2.01 m)	195 lb (88 kg)		Michigan
C	52	Steve Hayes	7 ft 0 in (2.13 m)	205 lb (93 kg)		Idaho State
SG	10	Vinnie Johnson	6 ft 2 in (1.88 m)	200 lb (91 kg)		Baylor
F	42	Edgar Jones	6 ft 10 in (2.08 m)	225 lb (102 kg)		Nevada
F	22	Jeff Judkins	6 ft 6 in (1.98 m)	185 lb (84 kg)		Utah
C	40	Bill Laimbeer	6 ft 11 in (2.11 m)	245 lb (111 kg)		Notre Dame
G	30	Ron Lee	6 ft 4 in (1.93 m)	193 lb (88 kg)		Oregon
SG	25	John Long	6 ft 5 in (1.96 m)	195 lb (88 kg)		Detroit Mercy
PG	11	Isiah Thomas	6 ft 1 in (1.85 m)	180 lb (82 kg)		Indiana
F	7	Kelly Tripucka	6 ft 6 in (1.98 m)	220 lb (100 kg)		Notre Dame
G/F	41	Terry Tyler	6 ft 7 in (2.01 m)	215 lb (98 kg)		Detroit Mercy

Coaches
Head coach
- Scotty Robertson
Assistant(s)
- Don Chaney

Legend
- (DP) Unsigned draft pick
- (FA) Free agent
- (S) Suspended
- Injured

== Regular season ==
=== Season standings ===
Central Division	W	L	PCT	GB	Home	Road	Div
y-Milwaukee Bucks	55	27	.671	–	31–10	24–17	24–6
x-Atlanta Hawks	42	40	.512	13.0	24–17	18–23	15–14
Detroit Pistons	39	43	.476	16.0	23–18	16–25	19–11
Indiana Pacers	35	47	.427	20.0	25–16	10–31	14–16
Chicago Bulls	34	48	.415	21.0	22–19	12–29	12–17
Cleveland Cavaliers	15	67	.183	40.0	9–32	6–35	5–25

#	Eastern Conference				
#	Team	W	L	PCT	GB
1	z-Boston Celtics	63	19	.768	–
2	y-Milwaukee Bucks	55	27	.671	8
3	x-Philadelphia 76ers	58	24	.707	5
4	x-New Jersey Nets	44	38	.537	19
5	x-Washington Bullets	43	39	.524	20
6	x-Atlanta Hawks	42	40	.512	21
7	Detroit Pistons	39	43	.476	24
8	Indiana Pacers	35	47	.427	28
9	Chicago Bulls	34	48	.415	29
10	New York Knicks	33	49	.402	30
11	Cleveland Cavaliers	15	67	.183	48

z - clinched division title
y - clinched division title
x - clinched playoff spot

== Game log ==
=== Regular season ===
1981–82 game log
Total: 39–43 (Home: 23–18; Road: 16–25)
October: 2–0 (home: 1–0; road: 1–0)

Game	Date	Team	Score	High points	High rebounds	High assists	Location Attendance	Record
1	October 30	Milwaukee	W 118–113				Pontiac Silverdome	1–0
2	October 31	@ Chicago						

November: 6–7 (home: 4–3; road: 2–4)

Game	Date	Team	Score	High points	High rebounds	High assists	Location Attendance	Record
3	November 5	New Jersey	W 109–103				Pontiac Silverdome	3–0
4	November 6	@ Washington	L 82–86				Capital Centre	3–1
5	November 7	Boston	L 88–129				Pontiac Silverdome	3–2
6	November 10	Philadelphia	L 93–95				Pontiac Silverdome	3–3
7	November 12	Cleveland						
8	November 14	@ Atlanta	W 117–104				The Omni	5–3
9	November 18	@ Cleveland						
10	November 19	Washington	W 122–97				Pontiac Silverdome	6–4
11	November 21	Utah						
12	November 24	@ Milwaukee	L 95–103				MECCA Arena	7–5
13	November 25	@ Kansas City						
14	November 27	Atlanta	L 112–114 (OT)				Pontiac Silverdome	8–6
15	November 28	@ Philadelphia	L 103–116				The Spectrum	8–7

December: 5–10 (home: 2–3; road: 3–7)

Game	Date	Team	Score	High points	High rebounds	High assists	Location Attendance	Record
16	December 1	@ New York						
17	December 2	@ Boston	L 114–115				Boston Garden	8–9
18	December 4	@ Indiana						
19	December 5	Milwaukee	L 108–111				Pontiac Silverdome	8–11
20	December 10	New York						
21	December 12	@ Seattle	L 111–117				Kingdome	8–13
22	December 13	@ Portland						
23	December 15	@ Golden State						
24	December 17	Indiana						
25	December 19	New York						
26	December 22	@ Dallas						
27	December 23	@ Denver	W 124–119				McNichols Sports Arena	12–15
28	December 26	Chicago						
29	December 29	@ Washington	L 125–129				Capital Centre	13–16
30	December 30	@ New Jersey	L 119–130				Brendan Byrne Arena	13–17

January: 5–9 (home: 2–4; road: 3–5)

Game	Date	Team	Score	High points	High rebounds	High assists	Location Attendance	Record
31	January 2	@ New York						
32	January 5	Philadelphia	W 124–101				Pontiac Silverdome	14–18
33	January 7	Phoenix	L 94–110				Pontiac Silverdome	14–19
34	January 9	Los Angeles	L 127–130				Pontiac Silverdome	14–20
35	January 10	@ Boston	L 124–134				Hartford Civic Center	14–21
36	January 12	@ Chicago						
37	January 14	Washington	L 114–121				Pontiac Silverdome	15–22
38	January 16	Boston	L 120–128				Pontiac Silverdome	15–23
39	January 17	@ Milwaukee	W 108–103				MECCA Arena	16–23
40	January 19	@ Utah						
41	January 21	@ San Diego						
42	January 22	@ Los Angeles	L 111–123				The Forum	17–25
43	January 23	@ Phoenix	L 90–113				Arizona Veterans Memorial Coliseum	17–26
44	January 27	Atlanta	W 108–107				Pontiac Silverdome	18–26

February: 7–6 (home: 5–3; road: 2–3)

Game	Date	Team	Score	High points	High rebounds	High assists	Location Attendance	Record
45	February 2	@ Atlanta	W 106–105				The Omni	19–26
46	February 5	@ Chicago						
47	February 6	New Jersey	L 120–125				Pontiac Silverdome	20–27
48	February 9	Chicago						
49	February 10	@ New Jersey	L 108–115				Brendan Byrne Arena	21–28
50	February 11	Cleveland						
51	February 13	Portland						
52	February 16	Houston	W 111–109				Pontiac Silverdome	23–29
53	February 17	@ San Antonio	L 112–126				HemisFair Arena	23–30
54	February 20	Indiana						
55	February 25	San Antonio	L 116–119				Pontiac Silverdome	24–31
56	February 27	Kansas City						
57	February 28	@ Indiana						

March: 9–7 (home: 5–2; road: 4–5)

Game	Date	Team	Score	High points	High rebounds	High assists	Location Attendance	Record
58	March 2	@ Milwaukee	L 91–101				MECCA Arena	25–33
59	March 4	Chicago						
60	March 6	@ New York						
61	March 8	Boston	L 101–111				Pontiac Silverdome	27–34
62	March 10	Denver	L 113–124				Pontiac Silverdome	27–35
63	March 12	Golden State						
64	March 14	@ Cleveland						
65	March 16	San Diego						
66	March 18	Seattle	W 119–115				Pontiac Silverdome	31–35
67	March 19	@ Houston	W 111–102				The Summit	32–35
68	March 21	@ Atlanta	L 111–119				The Omni	32–36
69	March 25	Philadelphia	W 100–98				Pontiac Silverdome	33–36
70	March 26	@ Boston	L 104–125				Boston Garden	33–37
71	March 27	@ New Jersey	W 123–121				Brendan Byrne Arena	34–37
72	March 30	@ Washington	L 98–127				Capital Centre	34–38
73	March 31	@ Indiana						

April: 5–4 (home: 4–3; road: 1–1)

Game	Date	Team	Score	High points	High rebounds	High assists	Location Attendance	Record
74	April 1	Dallas						
75	April 3	Indiana						
76	April 7	Atlanta	W 120–115				Pontiac Silverdome	36–40
77	April 9	Milwaukee	L 100–118				Pontiac Silverdome	36–41
78	April 11	New York						
79	April 14	@ Philadelphia	L 111–119				The Spectrum	37–42
80	April 15	Cleveland						
81	April 17	New Jersey	L 132–147				Pontiac Silverdome	38–43
82	April 18	@ Cleveland						

1981–82 schedule

== Player statistics ==
Legend
GP	Games played	GS	Games started	MPG	Minutes per game
FG%	Field-goal percentage	3P%	3-point field-goal percentage	FT%	Free-throw percentage
RPG	Rebounds per game	APG	Assists per game	SPG	Steals per game
BPG	Blocks per game	PPG	Points per game

Player	GP	GS	MPG	FG%	3P%	FT%	RPG	APG	SPG	BPG	PPG
Kent Benson	75	72	32.9	.505	.273	.804	8.7	2.1	.88	1.30	12.5
Kenny Carr	28	6	15.9	.458	.000	.646	4.9	.8	.21	.21	7.4
Glenn Hagan	4	0	6.3	.429	.000	1.000	1.0	2.0	.33	.00	1.8
Alan Hardy	38	0	8.2	.456	.000	.621	0.9	.5	.24	.11	3.7
Steve Hayes	26	0	15.8	.495	.000	.610	3.8	.9	.12	.69	4.5
Phil Hubbard	52	38	21.2	.505	.000	.650	5.2	1.3	.73	.31	10.0
Vinnie Johnson	67	15	17.8	.493	.273	.754	2.1	2.4	.75	.34	7.7
Edgar Jones	48	19	16.7	.548	.500	.698	4.3	.8	.58	1.92	7.8
Jeff Judkins	30	0	8.4	.383	.100	.615	1.1	.5	.20	.67	2.6
Greg Kelser	11	0	16.6	.407	.000	.659	3.5	1.1	.45	.64	8.8
Bill Laimbeer	30	30	31.2	.516	.143	.813	11.3	1.8	.57	1.13	12.8
Ron Lee	81	7	18.1	.358	.305	.706	1.9	3.9	1.43	.25	3.4
John Long	69	66	32.0	.492	.133	.865	3.7	2.1	.94	.36	21.9
Paul Mokeski	39	3	13.4	.441	.000	.758	3.1	.6	.33	.59	3.2
Isiah Thomas	72	72	33.8	.424	.288	.704	2.9	7.8	2.08	.24	17.0
Kelly Tripucka	82	82	37.5	.496	.227	.797	5.4	3.3	1.09	.25	21.6
Terry Tyler	82	0	24.3	.523	.250	.740	6.0	5.4	.94	1.95	9.9
Larry Wright	1	0	6.0	.000	.000	.000	.0	.0	.0	.0	.0

== Awards and records ==
- Isiah Thomas, NBA All-Rookie Team 1st Team
- Kelly Tripucka, NBA All-Rookie Team 1st Team

== See also ==
- 1981-82 NBA season
