= 1981–82 Philadelphia 76ers season =

NBA professional basketball team season

- Conference champions
- Head coach: Billy Cunningham
- General manager: Pat Williams
- Arena: The Spectrum

Results
- Record: 58–24 (.707)
- Place: Division: 2nd (Atlantic); Conference: 3rd (Eastern)
- Playoff finish: NBA Finals (lost to Lakers 2–4)
- Stats at Basketball Reference

Local media
- Television: WPHL-TV; PRISM
- Radio: WIP

The 1981–82 Philadelphia 76ers season was the 76ers thirty-third season in the NBA and 19th season in Philadelphia. They would finish with a record of 58–24.

== Background ==
During the playoffs, the Sixers swept the Atlanta Hawks in two games in the First Round, and defeated the Milwaukee Bucks in six games in the Semifinals to face off against the defending NBA champion Boston Celtics in the conference finals.

In the Eastern Conference finals, the Sixers defeated the Celtics in seven games to earn a trip to the NBA Finals for the third time in six years.

In the NBA Finals, the Sixers faced off against the Los Angeles Lakers in a rematch of the 1980 NBA Finals, in which the Lakers won in six games. In the deciding seventh game, with under a minute and a Sixers victory well secured, the fans at the Boston Garden chanted "Beat LA" to the Sixers, one of pro basketball's most enduring moments, wanting the team to defeat the Lakers in the NBA Finals, as Celtics fans hated the Lakers. The Lakers went on to win in the NBA Finals, however, defeating the Sixers in six games to capture their second NBA championship in the 1980s. The Lakers won game one by going on an incredible 40-9 scoring spurt in the second half. The home team then won each of the remaining five contests.

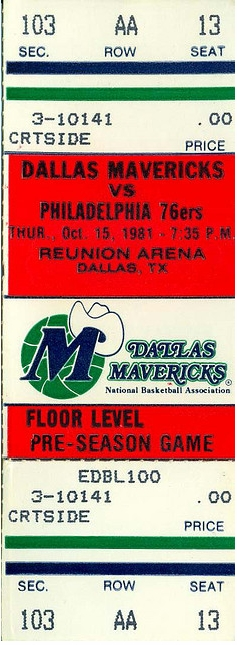
A ticket for an October 1981 pre-season game between the 76ers and the Dallas Mavericks.

== Draft picks ==
Round	Pick	Player	Position	Nationality	College
1	22	Franklin Edwards	PG	United States	Cleveland State
2	46	Vernon Smith		United States	Texas A&M
3	68	Ernest Graham		United States	Maryland
4	92	Rynn Wright		United States	Texas A&M
5	114	Steve Craig		United States	Brigham Young
6	138	Michael Thomas		United States	North Park
7	160	John Crawford		United States	Kansas
8	183	Frank Gilroy		United States	St. John's
9	202	Ron Wister		United States	Temple
10	223	Pete Mullenberg		United States	Delaware

== Roster ==
Philadelphia 76ers roster
Players

Pos.	No.	Player	Height	Weight	DOB	From
F	42	Mike Bantom	6 ft 9 in (2.06 m)	200 lb (91 kg)	1951-12-03	Saint Joseph's
G	10	Maurice Cheeks	6 ft 1 in (1.85 m)	180 lb (82 kg)	1956-09-08	West Texas A&M
F	25	Earl Cureton	6 ft 9 in (2.06 m)	210 lb (95 kg)	1957-09-03	Detroit Mercy
C	53	Darryl Dawkins	6 ft 11 in (2.11 m)	251 lb (114 kg)	1957-01-11	Maynard Evans HS (FL)
G	14	Franklin Edwards	6 ft 1 in (1.85 m)	170 lb (77 kg)	1959-02-02	Cleveland State
F	6	Julius Erving	6 ft 6 in (1.98 m)	210 lb (95 kg)	1950-02-22	UMass
G	9	Lionel Hollins	6 ft 3 in (1.91 m)	185 lb (84 kg)	1953-10-19	Arizona State
F	18	Ollie Johnson	6 ft 6 in (1.98 m)	200 lb (91 kg)	1949-05-11	Temple
F	24	Bobby Jones	6 ft 9 in (2.06 m)	210 lb (95 kg)	1951-12-18	North Carolina
C	11	Caldwell Jones	6 ft 11 in (2.11 m)	217 lb (98 kg)	1950-08-04	Albany State
G	4	Clint Richardson	6 ft 3 in (1.91 m)	195 lb (88 kg)	1956-08-07	Seattle
F	50	Steve Mix	6 ft 7 in (2.01 m)	215 lb (98 kg)	1947-12-30	Toledo
G	22	Andrew Toney	6 ft 3 in (1.91 m)	178 lb (81 kg)	1957-11-23	Louisiana

Coaches
Head coach
- Billy Cunningham

Legend
- (DP) Unsigned draft pick
- (FA) Free agent
- (S) Suspended
- Injured

== Regular season ==
=== Season standings ===
Atlantic Division	W	L	PCT	GB	Home	Road	Div
y-Boston Celtics	63	19	.768	–	35–6	28–13	20–4
x-Philadelphia 76ers	58	24	.707	5.0	32–9	26–15	16–8
x-New Jersey Nets	44	38	.537	19.0	25–16	19–22	12–12
x-Washington Bullets	43	39	.524	20.0	22–19	21–20	7–17
New York Knicks	33	49	.402	30.0	19–22	14–27	5–19

#	Eastern Conference				
#	Team	W	L	PCT	GB
1	z-Boston Celtics	63	19	.768	–
2	y-Milwaukee Bucks	55	27	.671	8
3	x-Philadelphia 76ers	58	24	.707	5
4	x-New Jersey Nets	44	38	.537	19
5	x-Washington Bullets	43	39	.524	20
6	x-Atlanta Hawks	42	40	.512	21
7	Detroit Pistons	39	43	.476	24
8	Indiana Pacers	35	47	.427	28
9	Chicago Bulls	34	48	.415	29
10	New York Knicks	33	49	.402	30
11	Cleveland Cavaliers	15	67	.183	48

== Game log ==
=== Regular season ===
1981–82 game log
Total: 58–24 (home: 32–9; road: 26–15)
October: 2–0 (home: 1–0; road: 1–0)

Game	Date	Team	Score	High points	High rebounds	High assists	Location Attendance	Record
1
2	October 31	@ Atlanta	W 108–106				The Omni	2–0

November: 11–1 (home: 6–1; road: 5–0)

Game	Date	Team	Score	High points	High rebounds	High assists	Location Attendance	Record
3	November 3	@ Washington	W 112–99				Capital Centre	3–0
4	November 4	Indiana	W 107–99				The Spectrum	4–0
5	November 6	Atlanta	L 99–106				The Spectrum	4–1
6	November 10	@ Detroit	W 95–93				Pontiac Silverdome	5–1
10	November 18	Milwaukee	W 102–100				The Spectrum	9–1
12	November 21	Houston	W 135–106				The Spectrum	11–1
13	November 27	@ Indiana	W 124–112 (OT)				Market Square Arena	12–1
14	November 28	Detroit	W 116–103				The Spectrum	13–1

December: 9–5 (home: 3–2; road: 6–3)

Game	Date	Team	Score	High points	High rebounds	High assists	Location Attendance	Record
15	December 1	@ Atlanta	W 107–98				The Omni	14–1
16	December 2	San Antonio	L 101–106				The Spectrum	14–2
17	December 4	@ Boston	L 103–111				Boston Garden	14–3
18	December 5	@ New Jersey	W 109–102				Brendan Byrne Arena	15–3
19	December 9	Denver	W 137–109				The Spectrum	16–3
22	December 13	@ Milwaukee	L 108–127				The MECCA	18–4
24	December 19	Boston	W 123–118 (OT)				The Spectrum	19–5
26	December 27	@ Phoenix	L 96–99				Arizona Veterans Memorial Coliseum	20–6
27	December 29	@ Golden State	W 142–135				Oakland–Alameda County Coliseum	21–6
28	December 30	@ Seattle	W 102–99				Kingdome	22–6

January: 8–8 (home: 3–3; road: 5–5)

Game	Date	Team	Score	High points	High rebounds	High assists	Location Attendance	Record
29	January 1	@ Portland	W 120–105				Memorial Coliseum	23–6
31	January 5	@ Detroit	L 101–124				Pontiac Silverdome	24–7
32	January 6	Washington	W 126–112				The Spectrum	25–7
33	January 8	@ Boston	L 90–96				Boston Garden	25–8
34	January 9	New Jersey	L 113–120				The Spectrum	25–9
35	January 12	@ Washington	W 95–92				Capital Centre	26–9
36	January 13	Milwaukee	L 107–111				The Spectrum	26–10
37	January 15	Atlanta	L 90–96				The Spectrum	26–11
38	January 17	@ New Jersey	L 97–105				Brendan Byrne Arena	26–12
39	January 20	Portland	W 115–110				The Spectrum	27–12
40	January 22	@ Indiana	W 112–105				Market Square Arena	28–12
41	January 23	Seattle	W 100–87				The Spectrum	29–12
42	January 26	@ San Antonio	L 95–103				HemisFair Arena	29–13
44	January 28	@ Houston	L 101–109				The Summit	30–14

February: 10–2 (home: 8–0; road: 2–2)

Game	Date	Team	Score	High points	High rebounds	High assists	Location Attendance	Record
45	February 3	Washington	W 122–96				The Spectrum	31–14
46	February 5	New Jersey	W 116–112				The Spectrum	32–14
48	February 10	Indiana	W 102–96				The Spectrum	34–14
53	February 21	Phoenix	W 109–102				The Spectrum	39–14
55	February 26	@ Los Angeles	L 114–116 (2OT)				The Forum	40–15
56	February 27	@ Denver	L 125–134				McNichols Sports Arena	40–16

March: 10–6 (home: 7–2; road: 3–4)

Game	Date	Team	Score	High points	High rebounds	High assists	Location Attendance	Record
59	March 5	Atlanta	W 89–80				The Spectrum	42–17
60	March 7	Los Angeles	W 119–113				The Spectrum	43–17
61	March 10	Golden State	W 134–114				The Spectrum	44–17
63	March 16	@ Milwaukee	L 91–106				The MECCA	45–18
64	March 17	Washington	W 102–93				The Spectrum	46–18
65	March 19	Indiana	W 112–95				The Spectrum	47–18
66	March 21	Boston	L 111–123				The Spectrum	47–19
67	March 24	New Jersey	L 106–111				The Spectrum	47–20
68	March 25	@ Detroit	L 98–100				Pontiac Silverdome	47–21
70	March 28	@ Boston	W 116–98				Boston Garden	49–21
71	March 30	@ Milwaukee	L 114–116 (OT)				The MECCA	49–22

April: 8–2 (home: 4–1; road: 4–1)

Game	Date	Team	Score	High points	High rebounds	High assists	Location Attendance	Record
76	April 7	@ New Jersey	W 116–113				Brendan Byrne Arena	53–23
77	April 9	@ Atlanta	L 88–103				The Omni	54–23
78	April 11	Boston	L 109–110 (OT)				The Spectrum	54–24
79	April 13	@ Indiana	W 93–89				Market Square Arena	55–24
80	April 14	Detroit	W 119–111				The Spectrum	56–24
81	April 16	@ Washington	W 100–96				Capital Centre	57–24
82	April 18	Milwaukee	W 110–86				The Spectrum	58–24

1981–82 schedule

=== Playoffs ===
1982 playoff game log
First Round: 2–0 (home: 1–0; road: 1–0)

Game	Date	Team	Score	High points	High rebounds	High assists	Location Attendance	Series
1	April 21	Atlanta	W 111–76	Darryl Dawkins (27)	Darryl Dawkins (9)	Maurice Cheeks (6)	Spectrum; 11,250	1–0
2	April 23	@ Atlanta	W 98–95 (OT)	Julius Erving (28)	Dawkins, C. Jones (8)	Julius Erving (6)	Omni Coliseum; 8,703	2–0

Conference semifinals: 4–2 (home: 2–1; road: 2–1)

Game	Date	Team	Score	High points	High rebounds	High assists	Location Attendance	Series
1	April 25	Milwaukee	W 125–122	Julius Erving (34)	Caldwell Jones (16)	Maurice Cheeks (10)	Spectrum; 10,086	1–0
2	April 28	Milwaukee	W 120–108	Andrew Toney (31)	Caldwell Jones (9)	Maurice Cheeks (8)	Spectrum; 14,716	2–0
3	May 1	@ Milwaukee	L 91–92	Maurice Cheeks (19)	Caldwell Jones (6)	Maurice Cheeks (8)	MECCA Arena; 11,052	2–1
4	May 2	@ Milwaukee	W 100–93	Julius Erving (21)	Julius Erving (11)	Julius Erving (9)	MECCA Arena; 11,052	3–1
5	May 5	Milwaukee	L 98–110	Julius Erving (28)	Julius Erving (10)	Maurice Cheeks (9)	Spectrum; 16,668	3–2
6	May 7	@ Milwaukee	W 102–90	Maurice Cheeks (26)	Caldwell Jones (12)	Julius Erving (7)	MECCA Arena; 11,052	4–2

Conference finals: 4–3 (home: 2–1; road: 2–2)

Game	Date	Team	Score	High points	High rebounds	High assists	Location Attendance	Series
1	May 9	@ Boston	L 81–121	Andrew Toney (15)	four players tied (7)	Andrew Toney (4)	Boston Garden; 15,320	0–1
2	May 12	@ Boston	W 121–113	Andrew Toney (30)	Caldwell Jones (11)	Maurice Cheeks (14)	Boston Garden; 15,320	1–1
3	May 15	Boston	W 99–97	Julius Erving (19)	Caldwell Jones (12)	Maurice Cheeks (10)	Spectrum; 18,364	2–1
4	May 16	Boston	W 119–94	Andrew Toney (39)	Caldwell Jones (11)	Maurice Cheeks (11)	Spectrum; 18,364	3–1
5	May 19	@ Boston	L 85–114	Andrew Toney (18)	Darryl Dawkins (10)	Lionel Hollins (7)	Boston Garden; 15,320	3–2
6	May 21	Boston	L 75–88	Julius Erving (24)	Caldwell Jones (17)	Maurice Cheeks (7)	Spectrum; 18,364	3–3
7	May 23	@ Boston	W 120–106	Andrew Toney (34)	Caldwell Jones (10)	Maurice Cheeks (11)	Boston Garden; 15,320	4–3

NBA Finals: 2–4 (home: 2–1; road: 0–3)

Game	Date	Team	Score	High points	High rebounds	High assists	Location Attendance	Series
1	May 27	Los Angeles	L 117–124	Julius Erving (27)	Caldwell Jones (11)	Cheeks, Toney (9)	Spectrum; 18,364	0–1
2	May 30	Los Angeles	W 110–94	Julius Erving (24)	Julius Erving (14)	Andrew Toney (11)	Spectrum; 18,364	1–1
3	June 1	@ Los Angeles	L 108–129	Andrew Toney (36)	Darryl Dawkins (13)	Maurice Cheeks (9)	The Forum; 17,505	1–2
4	June 3	@ Los Angeles	L 101–111	Andrew Toney (28)	Bobby Jones (9)	Andrew Toney (11)	The Forum; 17,505	1–3
5	June 6	Los Angeles	W 135–102	Andrew Toney (31)	Julius Erving (12)	Toney, Cheeks (8)	Spectrum; 18,364	2–3
6	June 8	@ Los Angeles	L 104–114	Julius Erving (30)	Caldwell Jones (9)	Maurice Cheeks (9)	The Forum; 17,505	2–4

1982 schedule

== Awards and records ==
- Julius Erving, All-NBA First Team
- Bobby Jones, NBA All-Defensive First Team
- Caldwell Jones, NBA All-Defensive First Team
