= Bill Hanzlik =

American basketball player and coach

Personal information
- Born: December 6, 1957 (age 68) Middletown, Ohio, U.S.
- Listed height: 6 ft 7 in (2.01 m)
- Listed weight: 185 lb (84 kg)

Career information
- High school: Lake Oswego (Lake Oswego, Oregon); Beloit Memorial (Beloit, Wisconsin)
- College: Notre Dame (1976–1980)
- NBA draft: 1980: 1st round, 20th overall pick
- Drafted by: Seattle SuperSonics
- Playing career: 1980–1990
- Position: Shooting guard / small forward
- Number: 22, 24

Career history

Playing
- 1980–1982: Seattle SuperSonics
- 1982–1990: Denver Nuggets

Coaching
- 1991–1996: Charlotte Hornets (assistant)
- 1996–1997: Atlanta Hawks (assistant)
- 1997–1998: Denver Nuggets

Career highlights
- NBA All-Defensive Second Team (1986)

Career NBA statistics
- Points: 5,414 (7.2 ppg)
- Rebounds: 2,058 (2.8 rpg)
- Assists: 2,058 (2.8 apg)
- Stats at NBA.com
- Stats at Basketball Reference

William Henry Hanzlik (born December 6, 1957) is an American former professional basketball player and coach.

== College career ==
A 6'7" guard, Hanzlik played college basketball at the University of Notre Dame. He was selected for the 1980 US Men's Olympic Team, which did not compete due to the US's boycott of the Moscow Games. However, in 2007 he did receive one of 461 Congressional Gold Medals created especially for the spurned athletes.

== Professional career ==
He was selected with the 20th pick of the 1980 NBA draft by the Seattle SuperSonics. A defensive specialist, at the time of his selection Hanzlik had the lowest college scoring average (7.2 ppg) for any player selected in the first round of the draft. Hanzlik played in the NBA for ten years – two with the Sonics and eight with the Denver Nuggets. He was a 1986 All-Defense second team selection. Coach Doug Moe often assigned Hanzlik to the opposing team's toughest player to guard, regardless of position, even once defending 7'4" center Ralph Sampson, with success. He worked as an assistant with the Charlotte Hornets and Atlanta Hawks in the 1990s.

== Coaching career ==
In 1997, Hanzlik (then an assistant with Atlanta) was tabbed to replace Dick Motta as head coach of the Denver Nuggets. He coached the Nuggets for one year, posting an 11–71 record (only two games better than the all-time worst team, the 1972–73 Philadelphia 76ers). He was fired at the end of the season and replaced with Mike D'Antoni. To date, Hanzlik owns the worst full-season record for a rookie coach in NBA history.

== Personal life ==
In 1986, he and Ray Baker formed the Gold Crown Foundation, a non-profit that operates year-round sports programs for area youths. After his dismissal as coach of the Nuggets, he decided to spend more time with the Foundation along with his family and four children.

He later became an analyst on Nuggets television broadcasts.

== Career playing statistics ==
Legend
GP	Games played	GS	Games started	MPG	Minutes per game
FG%	Field goal percentage	3P%	3-point field goal percentage	FT%	Free throw percentage
RPG	Rebounds per game	APG	Assists per game	SPG	Steals per game
BPG	Blocks per game	PPG	Points per game	**Bold**	Career high

=== NBA ===
==== Regular season ====
Year	Team	GP	GS	MPG	FG%	3P%	FT%	RPG	APG	SPG	BPG	PPG
1980–81	Seattle	74		17.0	**.478**	.200	.793	2.1	1.5	.8	.3	5.4
1981–82	Seattle	81	**76**	24.4	.468	.000	.784	3.3	2.3	1.0	**.4**	5.8
1982–83	Denver	**82**	8	18.9	.428	.143	.781	2.9	3.3	.9	.2	6.1
1983–84	Denver	80	14	18.4	.431	.250	**.807**	2.6	3.2	.9	.2	5.4
1984–85	Denver	80	1	20.9	.421	.067	.756	2.6	2.6	1.1	.3	7.8
1985–86	Denver	79	0	25.1	.447	.195	.785	3.3	**4.0**	**1.4**	.2	12.5
1986–87	Denver	73	10	**27.3**	.412	**.275**	.786	**3.5**	3.8	1.2	**.4**	**13.0**
1987–88	Denver	77	0	17.3	.380	.188	.791	2.2	2.2	.8	.2	4.5
1988–89	Denver	41	0	17.1	.437	.200	.782	2.3	2.1	.6	.1	4.9
1989–90	Denver	81	0	19.8	.452	.194	.743	2.6	2.3	1.0	.4	6.2
Career		748	109	20.8	.434	.213	.781	2.8	2.8	1.0	.3	7.2

==== Playoffs ====
Year	Team	GP	GS	MPG	FG%	3P%	FT%	RPG	APG	SPG	BPG	PPG
1982	Seattle	8		25.4	.471	.000	.909	4.0	2.5	.8	.6	6.5
1983	Denver	8		19.6	.400	.000	.824	3.1	2.6	.8	.6	6.8
1984	Denver	5		16.4	**.579**	.000	**1.000**	1.6	**4.2**	.6	.0	5.6
1985	Denver	**15**	0	20.7	.489	.000	.732	3.1	2.2	.9	.4	8.0
1986	Denver	6	0	17.0	.536	**1.000**	.813	1.0	3.2	.2	.2	7.3
1987	Denver	3	2	25.3	.320	.000	.600	2.0	2.3	1.3	.0	8.3
1988	Denver	11	0	19.3	.357	.000	.692	2.6	2.4	.5	**.8**	5.3
1989	Denver	3	**3**	**35.3**	.424	.500	.583	**6.7**	3.0	**1.7**	.3	**12.7**
1990	Denver	3	0	26.3	.294	.333	**1.000**	3.3	3.7	**1.7**	.7	7.0
Career		62	5	21.4	.435	.192	.770	2.9	2.7	.8	.5	7.1

== Head coaching record ==
Legend
Regular season	G	Games coached	W	Games won	L	Games lost	W–L %	Win–loss %
Playoffs	PG	Playoff games	PW	Playoff wins	PL	Playoff losses	PW–L %	Playoff win–loss %

Team	Year	G	W	L	W–L%	Finish	PG	PW	PL	PW–L%	Result
Denver	1997–98	82	11	71	.134	7th in Midwest	—	—	—	—	—
Career		82	11	71	.134		—	—	—	—	
