= Glen Gondrezick =

American basketball player (1955–2009)

Personal information
- Born: August 30, 1955 Boulder, Colorado, U.S.
- Died: April 27, 2009 (aged 53) Henderson, Nevada, U.S.
- Listed height: 6 ft 6 in (1.98 m)
- Listed weight: 218 lb (99 kg)

Career information
- High school: Boulder (Boulder, Colorado)
- College: UNLV (1973–1977)
- NBA draft: 1977: 2nd round, 26th overall pick
- Drafted by: New York Knicks
- Playing career: 1977–1984
- Position: Small forward / shooting guard
- Number: 44, 22

Career history
- 1977–1979: New York Knicks
- 1979–1983: Denver Nuggets
- 1983–1984: Rapident Livorno

Career highlights
- No. 25 retired by UNLV Runnin' Rebels

Career NBA statistics
- Points: 2,544 (5.8 ppg)
- Rebounds: 1,964 (4.5 rpg)
- Assists: 605 (1.4 apg)
- Stats at NBA.com
- Stats at Basketball Reference

Glen Michael 'Gondo' Gondrezick (August 30, 1955 – April 27, 2009) was an American basketball player who played in the National Basketball Association (NBA). He played college basketball for the UNLV Runnin' Rebels. He played the shooting guard and small forward positions (swingman).

== Basketball career ==
Born in Boulder, Colorado, he attended Boulder High School in his hometown. The 6'6" Gondrezick played collegiately at University of Nevada, Las Vegas. A starter on the Runnin' Rebels' first Final Four team in 1977, his jersey number 25 would be retired by the program twenty years later.

Gondrezick was drafted by the New York Knicks in 1977, in the second round (26th pick overall). He competed in six NBA seasons, appearing for the Knicks (two years) and the Denver Nuggets (four), and averaging six points, four rebounds, and one assist in 435 regular season matches.

== Later career and death ==
Gondrezick later became a broadcaster for the UNLV basketball team. He would also call the Mountain West Conference men's basketball tournament games for the Mountain West Radio Network from 2000–2008 before dying of complications from heart surgery on April 27, 2009, at the age of 53. He had received a heart transplant in September of the previous year.

== Personal life ==
Gondrezick's younger brother, Grant, was also a professional basketball player, and a shooting guard. He played two years in the NBA.

On July 23, 1987, Gondrezick shot himself after an altercation with his wife. He acknowledged to authorities that the gunshot wound to the left side of the chest was self-inflicted.

== Career statistics ==
Legend
GP	Games played	GS	Games started	MPG	Minutes per game
FG%	Field goal percentage	3P%	3-point field goal percentage	FT%	Free throw percentage
RPG	Rebounds per game	APG	Assists per game	SPG	Steals per game
BPG	Blocks per game	PPG	Points per game	**Bold**	Career high

=== NBA ===
==== Regular season ====
Year	Team	GP	GS	MPG	FG%	3P%	FT%	RPG	APG	SPG	BPG	PPG
1977–78	New York	72		14.1	.386		.686	3.5	1.2	.8	.3	4.8
1978–79	New York	75		**21.4**	.494		.567	**5.7**	1.4	**1.3**	.2	5.0
1979–80	Denver	59		17.3	**.517**	**.333**	.760	4.4	1.4	1.2	.3	6.6
1980–81	Denver	73		14.8	.471	.000	**.818**	4.2	1.1	1.2	.3	5.8
1981–82	Denver	**80**	0	21.2	.505	.000	.737	5.3	**1.9**	1.2	**.5**	**8.3**
1982–83	Denver	76	**2**	14.9	.456	.000	.719	4.0	1.3	1.1	.1	4.6
Career		435	2	17.3	.473	.143	.724	4.5	1.4	1.1	.3	5.8

==== Playoffs ====
Year	Team	GP	MPG	FG%	3P%	FT%	RPG	APG	SPG	BPG	PPG
1978	New York	**6**	11.7	**.526**		.625	2.8	1.0	**.8**	.0	4.2
1982	Denver	3	**17.0**	.400	.000	**.667**	2.7	**3.0**	.7	**.3**	**6.0**
1983	Denver	**6**	11.0	.368	–	.500	**3.3**	.7	.0	.2	2.5
Career		15	12.5	.431	.000	.615	3.0	1.3	.5	.1	3.9
