= Cedrick Hordges =

American basketball player

Personal information
- Born: January 8, 1957 Montgomery, Alabama
- Died: February 22, 2024 (aged 67)
- Listed height: 6 ft 8 in (2.03 m)
- Listed weight: 220 lb (100 kg)

Career information
- High school: Robert E. Lee (Montgomery, Alabama)
- College: Auburn (1975–1977); South Carolina (1978–1980)
- NBA draft: 1979: 3rd round, 49th overall pick
- Drafted by: Chicago Bulls
- Playing career: 1980–1994
- Position: Power forward
- Number: 34

Career history
- 1980–1982: Denver Nuggets
- 1982–1984: Pallacanestro Varese
- 1984–1985: Pallacanestro Livorno
- 1985–1988: Pallacanestro Pavia
- 1988–1989: Nuova Pallacanestro Gorizia
- 1990–1991: Fortitudo Bologna
- 1991–1992: Club Deportivo Oximesa
- 1992: Basket Modena
- 1992–1993: Estudiantes de Bahía Blanca
- 1993–1994: Luz y Fuerza

Career highlights
- Fourth-team Parade All-American (1975)
- Stats at NBA.com
- Stats at Basketball Reference

Cedrick Tyrone Hordges (January 8, 1957 – February 22, 2024) was a retired American basketball player. He played in the National Basketball Association (NBA) as a member of the Denver Nuggets from 1980 to 1982.

== Career ==
Hordges was drafted by the Chicago Bulls during the third round of the 1979 NBA draft from the University of South Carolina after transferring from Auburn University. He was then traded to the Nuggets, for whom he played in 145 games over two seasons. He then continued his professional career in Europe, playing for nine teams over 13 seasons.

== Personal life ==
Hordges died on February 22, 2024, at the age of 67.

== Career statistics ==
Legend
| GP | Games played | GS | Games started | MPG | Minutes per game |
| FG% | Field goal percentage | 3P% | 3-point field goal percentage | FT% | Free throw percentage |
| RPG | Rebounds per game | APG | Assists per game | SPG | Steals per game |
| BPG | Blocks per game | PPG | Points per game | **Bold** | Career high |

=== NBA ===
==== Regular season ====
| Year | Team | GP | GS | MPG | FG% | 3P% | FT% | RPG | APG | SPG | BPG | PPG |
|---|---|---|---|---|---|---|---|---|---|---|---|---|
| 1980–81 | Denver | 68 | | **23.5** | .460 | .000 | **.699** | **6.7** | **1.5** | **.5** | **.3** | **8.4** |
| 1981–82 | Denver | **77** | 1 | 17.8 | **.493** | **.231** | .583 | 5.1 | .8 | .3 | .2 | 6.8 |
| Career | | 145 | 1 | 20.5 | .475 | .188 | .639 | 5.9 | 1.2 | .4 | .3 | 7.6 |

==== Playoffs ====
| Year | Team | GP | MPG | FG% | 3P% | FT% | RPG | APG | SPG | BPG | PPG |
|---|---|---|---|---|---|---|---|---|---|---|---|
| 1982 | Denver | 3 | 15.0 | .421 | .000 | .750 | 4.3 | .7 | .3 | .0 | 6.3 |
