= Craig Dykema =

American basketball player

Personal information
- Born: June 11, 1959 (age 67) Lakewood, California
- Listed height: 6 ft 8 in (2.03 m)
- Listed weight: 190 lb (86 kg)

Career information
- High school: Lakewood (Lakewood, California)
- College: Long Beach CC (1977–1979); Long Beach State (1979–1981)
- NBA draft: 1981: 3rd round, 66th overall pick
- Drafted by: Phoenix Suns
- Playing career: 1981–1987
- Position: Small forward
- Number: 35

Career history
- 1981–1982: Phoenix Suns
- 1984–1985: Licor 43
- 1985–1986: Cajamadrid
- 1986–1987: Granollers

Career highlights
- Second-team All-PCAA (1981)
- Stats at NBA.com
- Stats at Basketball Reference

Craig Dykema (born June 11, 1959) is a retired American professional basketball small forward who spent the 1981–82 National Basketball Association (NBA) season with the Phoenix Suns. He was drafted in the 1981 NBA draft by the Suns from California State University, Long Beach.

== Career statistics ==
Legend
GP	Games played	GS	Games started	MPG	Minutes per game
FG%	Field goal percentage	3P%	3-point field goal percentage	FT%	Free throw percentage
RPG	Rebounds per game	APG	Assists per game	SPG	Steals per game
BPG	Blocks per game	PPG	Points per game	**Bold**	Career high

=== NBA ===
==== Regular season ====
Year	Team	GP	GS	MPG	FG%	3P%	FT%	RPG	APG	SPG	BPG	PPG
1981–82	Phoenix	32	0	3.2	.459	.500	.778	.4	.5	.1	.0	1.3

==== Playoffs ====
Year	Team	GP	MPG	FG%	3P%	FT%	RPG	APG	SPG	BPG	PPG
1982	Phoenix	6	2.0	.167	–	–	.7	.2	.0	.0	.3
