= 1981–82 Phoenix Suns season =

NBA team season

- Head coach: John MacLeod
- General manager: Jerry Colangelo
- Owners: Karl Eller, Don Pitt, Don Diamond, Bhavik Darji, Marvin Meyer, Richard L. Bloch
- Arena: Arizona Veterans Memorial Coliseum

Results
- Record: 46–36 (.561)
- Place: Division: 3rd (Pacific); Conference: 4th (Western)
- Playoff finish: Conference semifinals (lost to Lakers 0–4)
- Stats at Basketball Reference

Local media
- Television: KNXV
- Radio: KTAR

The 1981–82 Phoenix Suns season was the 14th season for the Phoenix Suns of the National Basketball Association. The Suns were in the playoffs for the fifth consecutive season, extending a then-franchise record. In the first round, Denver was taken down by the Suns, two games to one. Phoenix would find a tougher opponent, however, in the Western Conference Semifinals, getting swept four games to zero by the eventual league champions, Los Angeles Lakers. The Suns were led by head coach John MacLeod and played all home games in Arizona Veterans Memorial Coliseum.

Dennis Johnson again earned NBA All-Defensive First Team honors and was the lone All-Star Game participant from the Suns. Additionally, he led the Suns in scoring with his 19.5 points average, a personal career-high. Truck Robinson was not far behind with his 19.1 average, and paired that with rebounding average of 9.7 a game. Fellow big man Alvan Adams brought in 7 rebounds and 15 points a contest.

== Offseason ==
=== NBA draft ===
Round	Pick	Player	Position	Nationality	College
1	20	Larry Nance	Forward	United States	Clemson
3	62	Sam Clancy Jr.	Forward	United States	Pittsburgh
3	66	Craig Dykema	Forward	United States	Long Beach State
5	112	Paul Heuerman	Center	United States	Michigan
6	135	Pete Harris	Guard	United States	Northeastern
7	158	David Williams	Forward	United States	Southern
8	180	Steve Risley	Forward	United States	Indiana
9	200	Brian Johnson	Forward	United States	Colorado
10	220	Felton Sealey	Forward	United States	Oregon

== Roster ==
1981–82 Phoenix Suns roster
Players

Pos.	No.	Player	Height	Weight	DOB	From
F/C	33	Alvan Adams	6 ft 9 in (2.06 m)	210 lb (95 kg)	1954-07-19	Oklahoma
G/F	7	Dudley Bradley	6 ft 6 in (1.98 m)	195 lb (88 kg)	1957-03-19	North Carolina
F/C	45	Jeff Cook	6 ft 10 in (2.08 m)	215 lb (98 kg)	1956-10-21	Idaho State
G/F	6	Walter Davis	6 ft 6 in (1.98 m)	193 lb (88 kg)	1954-09-09	North Carolina
F	35	Craig Dykema	6 ft 8 in (2.03 m)	190 lb (86 kg)	1959-06-11	Long Beach State
G	24	Dennis Johnson	6 ft 4 in (1.93 m)	185 lb (84 kg)	1954-09-18	Pepperdine
C	53	Rich Kelley	7 ft 0 in (2.13 m)	235 lb (107 kg)	1953-03-23	Stanford
F	50	Joel Kramer	6 ft 7 in (2.01 m)	203 lb (92 kg)	1955-11-30	San Diego State
G	4	Kyle Macy	6 ft 3 in (1.91 m)	175 lb (79 kg)	1957-04-09	Kentucky
F/C	22	Larry Nance	6 ft 10 in (2.08 m)	205 lb (93 kg)	1959-02-12	Clemson
F	21	Leonard Robinson	6 ft 7 in (2.01 m)	225 lb (102 kg)	1951-10-04	Tennessee State
F	14	Alvin Scott	6 ft 7 in (2.01 m)	185 lb (84 kg)	1955-09-14	Oral Roberts

Coaches
Head coach
- John MacLeod (Bellarmine)
Assistant(s)
- Al Bianchi (Bowling Green)
- John Wetzel (Virginia Tech)

Legend
- (DP) Unsigned draft pick
- (FA) Free agent
- (S) Suspended
- Injured

== Regular season ==
=== Standings ===
Pacific Division	W	L	PCT	GB	Home	Road	Div
y-Los Angeles Lakers	57	25	.695	–	30–11	27–14	21–9
x-Seattle SuperSonics	52	30	.634	5.0	31–10	21–20	18–12
x-Phoenix Suns	46	36	.561	11.0	31–10	15–26	14–16
Golden State Warriors	45	37	.549	12.0	28–13	17–24	15–15
Portland Trail Blazers	42	40	.512	15.0	27–14	15–26	15–15
San Diego Clippers	17	65	.207	40.0	11–30	6–35	7–23

#	Western Conference				
#	Team	W	L	PCT	GB
1	c-Los Angeles Lakers	57	25	.695	–
2	y-San Antonio Spurs	48	34	.585	9
3	x-Seattle SuperSonics	52	30	.634	5
4	x-Denver Nuggets	46	36	.561	11
5	x-Phoenix Suns	46	36	.561	11
6	x-Houston Rockets	46	36	.561	11
7	Golden State Warriors	45	37	.549	12
8	Portland Trail Blazers	42	40	.512	15
9	Kansas City Kings	30	52	.366	27
10	Dallas Mavericks	28	54	.341	29
11	Utah Jazz	25	57	.305	32
12	San Diego Clippers	17	65	.207	40

== Playoffs ==
=== Game log ===
1982 playoff game log
First Round: 2–1 (home: 1–0; road: 1–1)

Game	Date	Team	Score	High points	High rebounds	High assists	Location Attendance	Series
1	April 20	@ Denver	L 113–129	Kyle Macy (22)	Truck Robinson (13)	Truck Robinson (6)	McNichols Sports Arena; 17,298	0–1
2	April 23	Denver	W 126–110	Dennis Johnson (29)	Alvan Adams (9)	Dennis Johnson (8)	Arizona Veterans Memorial Coliseum; 12,798	1–1
3	April 24	@ Denver	W 124–119	Dennis Johnson (26)	Truck Robinson (9)	Rich Kelley (7)	McNichols Sports Arena; 17,443	2–1

Conference semifinals: 0–4 (home: 0–2; road: 0–2)

Game	Date	Team	Score	High points	High rebounds	High assists	Location Attendance	Series
1	April 27	@ Los Angeles	L 96–115	Johnson, Adams (20)	Truck Robinson (14)	three players tied (4)	The Forum; 13,623	0–1
2	April 28	@ Los Angeles	L 98–117	Dennis Johnson (27)	Larry Nance (11)	Dennis Johnson (6)	The Forum; 15,558	0–2
3	April 30	Los Angeles	L 106–114	Alvan Adams (23)	Alvan Adams (12)	three players tied (5)	Arizona Veterans Memorial Coliseum; 14,660	0–3
4	May 2	Los Angeles	L 107–112	Dennis Johnson (31)	Macy, Nance (6)	Alvan Adams (8)	Arizona Veterans Memorial Coliseum; 11,932	0–4

1982 schedule

== Awards and honors ==
=== All-Star ===
- Dennis Johnson was selected as a reserve for the Western Conference in the All-Star Game. Johnson finished fourth in voting among Western Conference guards with 220,914 votes. It was his fourth consecutive All-Star selection.
- The other Suns player who received All-Star votes was Alvan Adams (134,441).

=== Season ===
- Kyle Macy led the league in free throw percentage with .899%.
- Dennis Johnson was named to the NBA All-Defensive First Team. Johnson also finished 21st in MVP voting.

== Player statistics ==
Legend
GP	Games played	GS	Games started	MPG	Minutes per game
FG%	Field-goal percentage	3P%	3-point field-goal percentage	FT%	Free-throw percentage
RPG	Rebounds per game	APG	Assists per game	SPG	Steals per game
BPG	Blocks per game	PPG	Points per game

=== Season ===
Phoenix Suns statistics
Player	GP	GS	MPG	FG%	3P%	FT%	RPG	APG	SPG	BPG	PPG
Alvan Adams	79	75	30.3	.494	.000	.781	7.4	4.5	1.4	1.0	15.1
Dudley Bradley	64	3	14.6	.445	.250	.740	1.4	1.3	1.2	.2	5.1
Jeff Cook	76	22	17.1	.422	.000	.664	4.0	1.3	.5	.3	5.1
Walter Davis	55	12	21.5	.523†	.188	.820	1.9	2.9	.8	.1	14.4
Craig Dykema	32	0	3.2	.459	.500^	.778	0.4	0.5	.1	.0	1.3
Dennis Johnson	80	77	36.7	.470	.190	.806	5.1	4.6	1.3	.7	19.5
Rich Kelley	81	39	23.4	.467	.000	.749	6.1	3.6	.8	.9	7.9
Joel Kramer	56	0	9.8	.414	.	.786	1.9	0.9	.3	.2	2.6
Kyle Macy	82	72	34.7	.514	.390^	.899	3.2	4.7	1.7	.1	14.2
John McCullough	8	0	2.9	.692†	.	.600	0.5	0.4	.3	.0	2.6
Larry Nance	80	0	14.8	.521	.000	.641	3.2	1.0	.5	.9	6.6
Truck Robinson	74	72	37.1	.513	1.000^	.687	9.7	2.4	.6	.4	19.1
Alvin Scott	81	38	21.5	.497	.000	.730	3.6	1.8	.7	.9	6.0

† – Minimum 300 field goals made.
^ – Minimum 25 three-pointers made.

=== Playoffs ===
Phoenix Suns statistics
Player	GP	GS	MPG	FG%	3P%	FT%	RPG	APG	SPG	BPG	PPG
Alvan Adams	7	7	33.3	.522	.	.786	7.3	3.7	2.0	1.4	16.9
Dudley Bradley	7	0	3.4	.250	.	1.000^	0.1	0.7	.1	.1	0.7
Jeff Cook	7	0	6.4	.500	.	.	1.3	1.0	.3	.3	1.1
Walter Davis	7	0	24.7	.448	.333	.917	3.1	4.3	.7	.1	18.1
Craig Dykema	6	0	2.0	.167	.	.	0.7	0.3	.0	.0	0.3
Dennis Johnson	7	7	38.7	.477	.000	.769	4.4	4.6	2.1	.6	22.3
Rich Kelley	7	7	27.3	.500	.	.700	6.9	4.3	.9	.4	9.7
Joel Kramer	4	0	5.0	.714†	.	.667	1.3	0.3	.3	.0	3.0
Kyle Macy	7	7	34.7	.427	.364	.938^	3.1	4.0	1.0	.1	13.6
Larry Nance	7	0	18.3	.610†	.	.500	4.6	1.0	1.4	1.6	7.7
Truck Robinson	7	7	30.4	.563	.	.300	7.6	2.7	.7	.1	13.3
Alvin Scott	7	0	18.1	.438	.000	.500	2.3	2.0	1.1	1.9	4.6

† – Minimum 20 field goals made.
^ – Minimum 10 free throws made.

== Transactions ==
=== Trades ===
June 8, 1981	To Indiana Pacers 1981 second-round draft pick ( (United States) El Leslie) 1982 second-round draft pick ( (United States) Jose Slaughter) Relinquished right to swap 1983 first round picks	To Phoenix Suns (United States) Dudley Bradley
October 1, 1981	To Chicago Bulls (United States) Johnny High	To Phoenix Suns 1983 third-round draft pick ( (United States) Winfred King)

=== Free agents ===
==== Additions ====
Date	Player	Contract	Old Team
June 19, 1981	Alvin Scott	Re-signed to four-year contract	Phoenix Suns
October 26, 1981	John McCullough	Undisclosed	

==== Subtractions ====
Date	Player	Reason left	New team
June 18, 1981	Mike Niles	Waived	
December 18, 1981	John McCullough	Waived	Billings Volcanos (CBA)
