= 1981–82 New York Knicks season =

Season of National Basketball Association team the New York Knicks

- Head coach: Red Holzman
- General manager: Eddie Donovan
- Arena: Madison Square Garden

Results
- Record: 33–49 (.402)
- Place: Division: 5th (Atlantic); Conference: 10th (Eastern)
- Playoff finish: Did not qualify
- Stats at Basketball Reference

Local media
- Television: WOR-TV; MSG Network
- Radio: WNEW

The 1981–82 New York Knicks season was the Knicks' 36th season in the NBA. The team finished second-to-last in the Eastern Conference with a 33–49 record.

== Draft picks ==
Round	Pick	Player	Position	Nationality	College
2	40	Greg Cook	PF	United States	LSU
3	57	Frank Brickowski	PF	United States	Penn State
3	63	Wayne McKoy	PF	United States	St. John's
4	86	Alex Bradley	SF	United States	Villanova

== Roster ==
1981–82 New York Knicks roster
Players

Pos.	No.	Player	Height	Weight	DOB	From
G	30	Alex Bradley	6 ft 6 in (1.98 m)	215 lb (98 kg)		Villanova
C	25	Bill Cartwright	7 ft 1 in (2.16 m)	245 lb (111 kg)		San Francisco
F	45	Hollis Copeland	6 ft 6 in (1.98 m)	180 lb (82 kg)		Rutgers
F	42	Larry Demic	6 ft 9 in (2.06 m)	225 lb (102 kg)		Arizona
F	43	Toby Knight	6 ft 9 in (2.06 m)	210 lb (95 kg)		Notre Dame
F	23	Maurice Lucas	6 ft 9 in (2.06 m)	215 lb (98 kg)		Marquette
G	14	Mike Newlin	6 ft 4 in (1.93 m)	200 lb (91 kg)		Utah
PG	20	Michael Ray Richardson	6 ft 5 in (1.96 m)	189 lb (86 kg)		Montana
SF	21	Campy Russell	6 ft 8 in (2.03 m)	215 lb (98 kg)		Michigan
G	9	Randy Smith	6 ft 3 in (1.91 m)	185 lb (84 kg)		Buffalo State
C	40	Marvin Webster	7 ft 1 in (2.16 m)	225 lb (102 kg)		Morgan State
G	44	Paul Westphal	6 ft 4 in (1.93 m)	195 lb (88 kg)		USC

Coaches
Head coach
- Red Holzman
Assistant(s)
- Butch Beard
- Hal Fischer

Legend
- (DP) Unsigned draft pick
- (FA) Free agent
- (S) Suspended
- Injured

== Regular season ==
After falling short in the 1981 NBA Playoffs, the Knicks' general manager Eddie Donovan attempted to add some veteran talent with the intention of making a more playoff-ready team. But Donovan's decisions showed he was out of touch with his team, and most importantly, his star player Michael Ray Richardson. First Ray Williams, Richardson's terrific backcourt teammate, was headed to free agency and therefore traded for veteran Maurice Lucas. Another one of Richardson's friends, Mike Glenn was also sent away, rather than being re-signed for a second-round draft pick.

The Knicks were still in a playoff hunt; despite not playing at a high level, they were 19–17 and were ready to make a run for the playoffs, when Donovan signed Paul Westphal; instead, the Knicks lost 16 of the last 21 games and were left out of the playoffs. It was here when Richardson asked what was wrong with the Knicks, he replied "The Ship Be Sinking". After the Season, Holtzman stepped down as Knicks head coach, and Richardson would be shipped off to the Golden State Warriors.

=== Season standings ===
Atlantic Division	W	L	PCT	GB	Home	Road	Div
y-Boston Celtics	63	19	.768	–	35–6	28–13	20–4
x-Philadelphia 76ers	58	24	.707	5.0	32–9	26–15	16–8
x-New Jersey Nets	44	38	.537	19.0	25–16	19–22	12–12
x-Washington Bullets	43	39	.524	20.0	22–19	21–20	7–17
New York Knicks	33	49	.402	30.0	19–22	14–27	5–19

#	Eastern Conference				
#	Team	W	L	PCT	GB
1	z-Boston Celtics	63	19	.768	–
2	y-Milwaukee Bucks	55	27	.671	8
3	x-Philadelphia 76ers	58	24	.707	5
4	x-New Jersey Nets	44	38	.537	19
5	x-Washington Bullets	43	39	.524	20
6	x-Atlanta Hawks	42	40	.512	21
7	Detroit Pistons	39	43	.476	24
8	Indiana Pacers	35	47	.427	28
9	Chicago Bulls	34	48	.415	29
10	New York Knicks	33	49	.402	30
11	Cleveland Cavaliers	15	67	.183	48

z – clinched division title
y – clinched division title
x – clinched playoff spot

== Game log ==
=== Regular season ===
1981–82 game log
Total: 33–49 (Home: 19–22; Road: 14–27)
October: 1–1 (home: 0–1; road: 1–0)

Game	Date	Team	Score	High points	High rebounds	High assists	Location Attendance	Record
1	October 30	@ New Jersey	W 103–99				Brendan Byrne Arena	1–0
2

November: 5–7 (home: 3–3; road: 2–4)

Game	Date	Team	Score	High points	High rebounds	High assists	Location Attendance	Record
3
4
5
6	November 10	New Jersey	W 111–99				Madison Square Garden	3–3
7
8	November 14	Philadelphia						
9
10
11
12
13
14

December: 9–7 (home: 4–4; road: 5–3)

Game	Date	Team	Score	High points	High rebounds	High assists	Location Attendance	Record
15
16
17
18
19
20
21
22	December 16	@ Philadelphia						
23
24
25	December 22	Philadelphia						
26	December 23	@ New Jersey	L 99–115				Brendan Byrne Arena	12–14
27	December 25	New Jersey	L 95–96				Madison Square Garden	12–15
28
29
30

January: 5–9 (home: 2–4; road: 3–5)

Game	Date	Team	Score	High points	High rebounds	High assists	Location Attendance	Record
31
32
33
34
35
36
37
38
39
40
41
42
43
44

February: 6–9 (home: 4–3; road: 2–6)

Game	Date	Team	Score	High points	High rebounds	High assists	Location Attendance	Record
45
46	February 3	@ Los Angeles	W 98–94				The Forum	21–25
47
48
49
50
51	February 13	Philadelphia						
52	February 14	@ Philadelphia						
53
54
55
56
57
58
59

March: 5–8 (home: 5–4; road: 0–4)

Game	Date	Team	Score	High points	High rebounds	High assists	Location Attendance	Record
60
61	March 4	Los Angeles	W 129–119 (OT)				Madison Square Garden	28–33
62
63
64
65
66
67
68
69
70
71	March 28	@ New Jersey	L 106–113				Brendan Byrne Arena	30–41
72

April: 2–8 (home: 1–3; road: 1–5)

Game	Date	Team	Score	High points	High rebounds	High assists	Location Attendance	Record
73
74	April 4	@ Philadelphia						
75
76
77
78
79	April 13	New Jersey	L 102–104				Madison Square Garden	33–36
80
81
82

1981–82 schedule

== See also ==
- 1981-82 NBA season
