= 1981–82 Cleveland Cavaliers season =

NBA professional basketball team season

- Head coach: Don Delaney (fired) (4–11); Bob Kloppenburg (interim) (0–3); Chuck Daly (fired) (9–32); Bill Musselman (interim) (2–21)
- General manager: Don Delaney
- Owner: Ted Stepien
- Arena: Coliseum at Richfield

Results
- Record: 15–67 (.183)
- Place: Division: 6th (Central); Conference: 11th (Eastern)
- Playoff finish: Did not qualify
- Stats at Basketball Reference

Local media
- Television: WUAB
- Radio: WBBG

The 1981–82 Cleveland Cavaliers season was the 12th season of the franchise in the National Basketball Association (NBA). The Cavaliers finished 15–67 (.183) tying the lowest winning percentage in franchise history along with the 1970–71 team.

== Offseason ==
=== Draft picks ===
Round	Pick	Player	Nationality	School/Club team
3	55	Mickey Dillard	United States	Florida State

== Roster ==
1981–82 Cleveland Cavaliers roster
Players

Pos.	No.	Player	Height	Weight	DOB	From
PF	52	Brad Branson	6 ft 10 in (2.08 m)	220 lb (100 kg)	1958–09–24	SMU
G	10	Ron Brewer	6 ft 4 in (1.93 m)	180 lb (82 kg)	1955–07–16	Arkansas
C	40	James Edwards	7 ft 0 in (2.13 m)	225 lb (102 kg)	1955–11–22	Washington
G	5	Mike Evans	6 ft 1 in (1.85 m)	170 lb (77 kg)	1955–04–19	Kansas State
SF	35	Phil Hubbard	6 ft 8 in (2.03 m)	215 lb (98 kg)	1956–12–13	Michigan
G	20	Geoff Huston	6 ft 2 in (1.88 m)	175 lb (79 kg)	1957–11–08	Texas Tech
C	44	Paul Mokeski	7 ft 0 in (2.13 m)	250 lb (113 kg)	1957–01–03	Kansas
G	14	Lowes Moore	6 ft 1 in (1.85 m)	170 lb (77 kg)	1957–05–05	West Virginia
F/C	24	Kevin Restani	6 ft 9 in (2.06 m)	225 lb (102 kg)	1951–12–23	San Francisco
F	11	Cliff Robinson	6 ft 9 in (2.06 m)	220 lb (100 kg)	1960–03–13	USC
G	13	James Silas	6 ft 1 in (1.85 m)	180 lb (82 kg)	1949–02–11	Stephen F. Austin
F	31	Richard Washington (injured)	6 ft 11 in (2.11 m)	220 lb (100 kg)	1955–07–15	UCLA
G	8	Scott Wedman	6 ft 7 in (2.01 m)	215 lb (98 kg)	1952–07–29	Colorado
G	33	Bob Wilkerson	6 ft 6 in (1.98 m)	195 lb (88 kg)	1954–08–15	Indiana

Coaches
Head coach
- Bill Musselman
Assistant(s)
- Gerald Oliver

Legend
- (DP) Unsigned draft pick
- (FA) Free agent
- (S) Suspended
- Injured

== Regular season ==
=== Season standings ===
Central Division	W	L	PCT	GB	Home	Road	Div
y-Milwaukee Bucks	55	27	.671	–	31–10	24–17	24–6
x-Atlanta Hawks	42	40	.512	13.0	24–17	18–23	15–14
Detroit Pistons	39	43	.476	16.0	23–18	16–25	19–11
Indiana Pacers	35	47	.427	20.0	25–16	10–31	14–16
Chicago Bulls	34	48	.415	21.0	22–19	12–29	12–17
Cleveland Cavaliers	15	67	.183	40.0	9–32	6–35	5–25

#	Eastern Conference				
#	Team	W	L	PCT	GB
1	z-Boston Celtics	63	19	.768	–
2	y-Milwaukee Bucks	55	27	.671	8
3	x-Philadelphia 76ers	58	24	.707	5
4	x-New Jersey Nets	44	38	.537	19
5	x-Washington Bullets	43	39	.524	20
6	x-Atlanta Hawks	42	40	.512	21
7	Detroit Pistons	39	43	.476	24
8	Indiana Pacers	35	47	.427	28
9	Chicago Bulls	34	48	.415	29
10	New York Knicks	33	49	.402	30
11	Cleveland Cavaliers	15	67	.183	48

== Game log ==
1981–82 game log
Total: 15–67 (Home: 9–32; Road: 6–35)
October: 0–1 (home: 0–0; road: 0–1)

Game	Date	Team	Score	High points	High rebounds	High assists	Location Attendance	Record

November: 4–10 (home: 2–4; road: 2–6)

Game	Date	Team	Score	High points	High rebounds	High assists	Location Attendance	Record
12	November 24, 1981	@ Atlanta	L 92–94 (OT)				The Omni; 4,697	4–8

December: 2–12 (home: 2–6; road: 0–6)

Game	Date	Team	Score	High points	High rebounds	High assists	Location Attendance	Record
19	December 9, 1981	Atlanta	W 112–108 (OT)				Coliseum at Richfield; 3,144	5–14

January: 2–11 (home: 1–6; road: 1–5)

Game	Date	Team	Score	High points	High rebounds	High assists	Location Attendance	Record
31	January 5, 1982	@ Atlanta	L 103–113				The Omni; 5,112	6–25
40	January 23, 1982	Atlanta	L 99–109				Coliseum at Richfield; 4,551	7–33

February: 3–9 (home: 2–5; road: 1–4)

Game	Date	Team	Score	High points	High rebounds	High assists	Location Attendance	Record
45	February 6, 1982	@ Atlanta	W 88–87				The Omni; 10,094	11–34

March: 3–13 (home: 2–6; road: 1–7)

Game	Date	Team	Score	High points	High rebounds	High assists	Location Attendance	Record

April: 0–11 (home: 0–5; road: 0–6)

Game	Date	Team	Score	High points	High rebounds	High assists	Location Attendance	Record
79	April 13, 1982	Atlanta	L 111–119				Coliseum at Richfield; 4,245	15–64

1981–82 schedule

== Player stats ==
Legend
GP	Games played	GS	Games started	MPG	Minutes per game
FG%	Field-goal percentage	3P%	3-point field-goal percentage	FT%	Free-throw percentage
RPG	Rebounds per game	APG	Assists per game	SPG	Steals per game
BPG	Blocks per game	PPG	Points per game

Player	GP	GS	MPG	FG%	3FG%	FT%	RPG	APG	SPG	BPG	PPG
Mike Mitchell	27	26	36.0	45.4	0.0	72.0	5.2	1.4	1.0	0.6	19.6
Ron Brewer	47	41	36.7	46.5	23.8	77.9	2.4	2.6	1.3	0.5	19.4
James Edwards	77	75	33.0	51.1	0.0	68.4	7.5	1.6	0.3	1.5	16.7
Cliff Robinson	30	29	31.5	45.1	0.0	72.9	9.6	1.6	1.4	1.4	16.3
Kenny Carr	46	42	32.2	51.7	11.1	65.9	8.6	1.4	1.3	0.3	15.0
Lowes Moore	4	0	17.5	50.0	20.0	75.0	1.0	3.8	1.5	0.3	11.3
James Silas	67	34	21.6	43.8	0.0	86.0	1.6	3.3	0.6	0.1	11.2
Bob Wilkerson	65	38	27.8	41.8	16.7	78.4	3.8	3.6	1.4	0.4	11.0
Scott Wedman	54	39	30.3	44.1	21.7	73.3	5.6	2.5	1.4	0.3	10.9
Phil Hubbard	31	2	23.7	46.7	0.0	72.6	6.5	0.8	0.9	0.1	10.4
Geoff Huston	78	43	30.9	48.4	30.0	76.5	1.9	7.6	0.9	0.1	10.3
Reggie Johnson	23	22	26.8	53.7	0.0	79.5	5.4	1.0	0.3	0.7	9.7
Roger Phegley	27	8	21.0	48.6	30.8	80.0	2.6	2.0	0.6	0.1	9.2
Bill Laimbeer	50	4	17.9	47.0	50.0	77.5	5.5	0.9	0.4	0.6	6.7
Richard Washington	18	2	17.4	43.5	0.0	60.0	4.2	0.8	0.4	0.1	6.1
Brad Branson	10	3	17.6	40.4	0.0	91.7	3.3	0.6	0.5	0.4	5.3
Mike Evans	8	0	9.3	31.4	0.0	62.5	1.3	2.5	0.5	0.0	3.4
Paul Mokeski	28	1	12.3	42.7	0.0	76.7	3.1	0.4	0.7	0.6	3.3
Keith Herron	30	0	9.0	36.8	0.0	87.5	0.7	0.8	0.3	0.1	2.8
Mickey Dillard	33	0	6.7	36.7	0.0	65.2	0.5	1.0	0.2	0.1	2.2
Mel Bennett	3	0	7.7	50.0	0.0	16.7	1.0	0.0	0.3	0.0	1.7
Kevin Restani	34	0	9.9	38.3	0.0	58.3	2.3	0.4	0.3	0.2	1.6
Don Ford	21	1	9.6	37.5	0.0	83.3	1.7	0.5	0.4	0.0	1.1

Player statistics citation:
