= 1981–82 Indiana Pacers season =

NBA professional basketball team season

- Head coach: Jack McKinney
- Arena: Market Square Arena

Results
- Record: 35–47 (.427)
- Place: Division: 4th (Central); Conference: 8th (Eastern)
- Playoff finish: Did not qualify
- Stats at Basketball Reference

Local media
- Television: WTTV
- Radio: WIBC

The 1981–82 Indiana Pacers season was Indiana's sixth season in the NBA and 15th season as a franchise.

== Offseason ==
=== Draft picks ===
Round	Pick	Player	Position	Nationality	College
1	14	Herb Williams	C	United States	Ohio State
2	36	Ray Blume	C	United States	Oregon State
2	37	Al Leslie	SG	United States	Bucknell
3	60	Purvis Miller	SF	United States	USC

== Roster ==
1981-82 Indiana Pacers roster
Players
Coaches

Pos.	#	Name	Ht.	Wt.	From
F	42	Mike Bantom	6 ft 9 in (2.06 m)	200 lb (91 kg)	1951–12–3	Saint Joseph's
G	10	Don Buse	6 ft 4 in (1.93 m)	190 lb (86 kg)	1950–8–10	Evansville
G	12	Butch Carter	6 ft 5 in (1.96 m)	180 lb (82 kg)	1958–6–11	Indiana
G	16	Johnny Davis	6 ft 2 in (1.88 m)	170 lb (77 kg)	1955–10–21	Dayton
F/C	45	Clemon Johnson	6 ft 10 in (2.08 m)	240 lb (109 kg)	1956–09–12	Florida A&M
F	24	George Johnson (injured)	6 ft 7 in (2.01 m)	210 lb (95 kg)	1956–12–8	St. John's
G/F	25	Billy Knight	6 ft 6 in (1.98 m)	195 lb (88 kg)	1952–06–9	Pittsburgh
F	30	George McGinnis	6 ft 8 in (2.03 m)	235 lb (107 kg)	1950-08-12	Indiana
F	55	Louis Orr	6 ft 8 in (2.03 m)	175 lb (79 kg)	1958–05–7	Syracuse
F/C	26	Tom Owens	6 ft 10 in (2.08 m)	215 lb (98 kg)	1949–06–28	South Carolina
G	14	Jerry Sichting	6 ft 1 in (1.85 m)	168 lb (76 kg)	1956–11–29	Purdue
G	11	Raymond Townsend	6 ft 3 in (1.91 m)	175 lb (79 kg)	1955–12–20	UCLA
F/C	32	Herb Williams	6 ft 10 in (2.08 m)	242 lb (110 kg)	1958–02–16	Ohio State

Head coach
- Jack McKinney

Legend
- (DP) Unsigned draft pick
- (FA) Free agent
- (S) Suspended
- Injured

Roster
Updated: 2012–10–10

== Regular season ==
=== Season standings ===
Central Division	W	L	PCT	GB	Home	Road	Div
y-Milwaukee Bucks	55	27	.671	–	31–10	24–17	24–6
x-Atlanta Hawks	42	40	.512	13.0	24–17	18–23	15–14
Detroit Pistons	39	43	.476	16.0	23–18	16–25	19–11
Indiana Pacers	35	47	.427	20.0	25–16	10–31	14–16
Chicago Bulls	34	48	.415	21.0	22–19	12–29	12–17
Cleveland Cavaliers	15	67	.183	40.0	9–32	6–35	5–25

#	Eastern Conference				
#	Team	W	L	PCT	GB
1	z-Boston Celtics	63	19	.768	–
2	y-Milwaukee Bucks	55	27	.671	8
3	x-Philadelphia 76ers	58	24	.707	5
4	x-New Jersey Nets	44	38	.537	19
5	x-Washington Bullets	43	39	.524	20
6	x-Atlanta Hawks	42	40	.512	21
7	Detroit Pistons	39	43	.476	24
8	Indiana Pacers	35	47	.427	28
9	Chicago Bulls	34	48	.415	29
10	New York Knicks	33	49	.402	30
11	Cleveland Cavaliers	15	67	.183	48

z - clinched division title
y - clinched division title
x - clinched playoff spot

== Game log ==
=== Regular season ===
1981–82 game log
Total: 35–47 (Home: 25–16; Road: 10–31)
October: 2–0 (home: 1–0; road: 1–0)

Game	Date	Team	Score	High points	High rebounds	High assists	Location Attendance	Record

November: 6–8 (home: 3–2; road: 3–6)

Game	Date	Team	Score	High points	High rebounds	High assists	Location Attendance	Record
3	November 4	@ Philadelphia	L 99–107	Knight (21)	Bantom (10)	Buse (13)	The Spectrum; 11,257	2–1
4	November 6	@ Boston	L 94–111	Owens (16)	Owens (7)	Davis (5)	Boston Garden; 15,320	2–2
9	November 15	@ Los Angeles	L 123–124 (2OT)	Owens (26)	Knight (8)	Buse, Davis (7)	The Forum; 14,140	4–5
15	November 27	Philadelphia	L 112–124 (OT)	Orr (24)	C Johnson (14)	McGinnis (5)	Market Square Arena; 15,613	7–8

December: 8–6 (home: 6–3; road: 2–3)

Game	Date	Team	Score	High points	High rebounds	High assists	Location Attendance	Record
17	December 1	Boston	W 90–87	Davis (21)	Williams (10)	Davis, Williams (4)	Market Square Arena; 12,634	9–8
21	December 11	@ Milwaukee						
23	December 15	Milwaukee						
30	December 29	Milwaukee						

January: 3–10 (home: 2–3; road: 1–7)

Game	Date	Team	Score	High points	High rebounds	High assists	Location Attendance	Record
37	January 15	Los Angeles	L 92–97	Davis (18)	Williams (16)	Davis (6)	Market Square Arena; 11,029	17–20
40	January 20	@ Boston	L 103–112	Knight (20)	Williams (9)	Buse, Davis, C Johnson, Orr (3)	Boston Garden; 15,320	18–22
41	January 22	Philadelphia	L 105–112	Williams (22)	C Johnson (12)	Davis (7)	Market Square Arena; 11,411	18–23
42	January 23	@ San Antonio	W 107–98	Davis (24)	Orr (11)	Buse (7)	HemisFair Arena; 10,236	19–23
All-Star Break

February: 8–7 (home: 7–3; road: 1–4)

Game	Date	Team	Score	High points	High rebounds	High assists	Location Attendance	Record
44	February 2	Boston	L 105–109	Buse, Orr (18)	Williams (12)	Buse (7)	Market Square Arena; 13,435	19–25
48	February 9	@ Milwaukee						
49	February 10	@ Philadelphia	L 96–102	Knight (19)	Knight (8)	Buse (5)	The Spectrum; 9,292	20–29
52	February 17	Milwaukee						
57	February 26	San Antonio	W 108–100	Buse (23)	Owens (9)	Buse (10)	Market Square Arena; 8,372	26–31

March: 6–9 (home: 4–3; road: 2–6)

Game	Date	Team	Score	High points	High rebounds	High assists	Location Attendance	Record
63	March 10	@ Boston	L 100–121	C Johnson (20)	C Johnson (11)	Buse (6)	Boston Garden; 15,320	29–34
67	March 19	@ Philadelphia	L 95–112	Knight (22)	C Johnson (18)	Buse (6)	The Spectrum; 12,522	30–37

April: 2–7 (home: 2–2; road: 0–5)

Game	Date	Team	Score	High points	High rebounds	High assists	Location Attendance	Record
75	April 4	@ Milwaukee						
79	April 13	Philadelphia	L 89–93	Davis (23)	Knight (10)	McGinnis (7)	Market Square Arena; 6,643	34–45

1981–82 schedule

== Player statistics ==
=== Ragular season ===
Player	POS	GP	GS	MP	REB	AST	STL	BLK	PTS	MPG	RPG	APG	SPG	BPG	PPG
Don Buse	PG	82	78	2,529	223	407	164	27	797	30.8	2.7	5.0	2.0	.3	9.7
Herb Williams	C	82	75	2,277	605	139	53	178	942	27.8	7.4	1.7	.6	2.2	11.5
Johnny Davis	SG	82	70	2,664	178	346	76	11	1,396	32.5	2.2	4.2	.9	.1	17.0
Billy Knight	SF	81	19	1,803	257	118	63	14	998	22.3	3.2	1.5	.8	.2	12.3
Louis Orr	SF	80	41	1,951	331	134	56	26	918	24.4	4.1	1.7	.7	.3	11.5
Clemon Johnson	C	79	42	1,979	571	127	60	112	747	25.1	7.2	1.6	.8	1.4	9.5
George McGinnis	PF	76	4	1,341	398	204	96	28	354	17.6	5.2	2.7	1.3	.4	4.7
Butch Carter	SG	75	0	1,035	79	60	34	11	442	13.8	1.1	.8	.5	.1	5.9
Tom Owens	PF	74	40	1,599	372	127	41	37	780	21.6	5.0	1.7	.6	.5	10.5
George L. Johnson	PF	59	4	720	217	40	36	25	300	12.2	3.7	.7	.6	.4	5.1
Jerry Sichting	PG	51	0	800	55	117	33	1	212	15.7	1.1	2.3	.6	.0	4.2
Mike Bantom^{†}	SF	39	37	1,037	214	68	38	24	458	26.6	5.5	1.7	1.0	.6	11.7
Raymond Townsend	SG	14	0	95	13	10	3	0	35	6.8	.9	.7	.2	.0	2.5

- ^{†} Denotes player spent time with another team in the season. Stats reflect time with the Pacers only.

== See also ==
- 1981-82 NBA season
