= 1981–82 Chicago Bulls season =

NBA professional basketball team season

- Head coach: Jerry Sloan (fired); Phil Johnson (interim); Rod Thorn (interim)
- General manager: Rod Thorn
- Owner(s): Arthur Wirtz and Jonathan Kovler
- Arena: Chicago Stadium

Results
- Record: 34–48 (.415)
- Place: Division: 5th (Central); Conference: 9th (Eastern)
- Playoff finish: Did not qualify
- Stats at Basketball Reference

Local media
- Television: WGN-TV/ONTV (Milo Hamilton, Johnny “Red” Kerr)
- Radio: WGCI (Jim Durham, Norm Van Lier)

The Chicago Bulls played their 16th season in the NBA in 1981–82.

== Draft picks ==
Round	Pick	Player	Position	Nationality	College
1	6	Orlando Woolridge	PF	United States	Notre Dame
2	32	Mike Olliver		United States	Lamar
4	84	Oliver Lee		United States	Marquette
5	108	Johnny Nash		United States	Arizona State
6	130	Roger Burkman	G	United States	Louisville
7	154	Scott Williams		United States	South Alabama
8	175	Ben Mitchell		United States	Alabama-Huntsville
9	197	Terry Martin		United States	Lambath
10	216	Kenny Easley		United States	UCLA

== Roster ==
1981–82 Chicago Bulls roster
Players

Pos.	No.	Player	Height	Weight	DOB	From
C	26	Coby Dietrick	6 ft 10 in (2.08 m)	220 lb (100 kg)	1948-07-23	San José State
C	53	Artis Gilmore	7 ft 2 in (2.18 m)	240 lb (109 kg)	1949-09-21	Jacksonville
F	34	David Greenwood	6 ft 9 in (2.06 m)	222 lb (101 kg)	1957-05-27	UCLA
G	11	Tracy Jackson	6 ft 6 in (1.98 m)	205 lb (93 kg)	1959-04-21	Notre Dame
F	13	Dwight Jones	6 ft 10 in (2.08 m)	210 lb (95 kg)	1952-02-27	Houston
F	35	Larry Kenon	6 ft 9 in (2.06 m)	205 lb (93 kg)	1952-12-13	Memphis
PG	12	Ronnie Lester	6 ft 2 in (1.88 m)	175 lb (79 kg)	1959-01-01	Iowa
G	14	Ricky Sobers	6 ft 3 in (1.91 m)	198 lb (90 kg)	1953-01-15	UNLV
G	24	Reggie Theus	6 ft 7 in (2.01 m)	190 lb (86 kg)	1957-10-13	UNLV
F	34	James Wilkes	6 ft 7 in (2.01 m)	195 lb (88 kg)	1958-04-01	UCLA
F	0	Orlando Woolridge	6 ft 9 in (2.06 m)	215 lb (98 kg)	1959-12-16	Notre Dame

Coaches
Head coach
- Jerry Sloan (fired)
- Phil Johnson (interim)
- Rod Thorn (interim)
Assistant(s)
- Bumper Tormohlen

Legend
- (DP) Unsigned draft pick
- (FA) Free agent
- (S) Suspended
- Injured

Roster
Updated: February 17, 1982

== Regular season ==
=== Season standings ===
Central Division	W	L	PCT	GB	Home	Road	Div
y-Milwaukee Bucks	55	27	.671	–	31–10	24–17	24–6
x-Atlanta Hawks	42	40	.512	13.0	24–17	18–23	15–14
Detroit Pistons	39	43	.476	16.0	23–18	16–25	19–11
Indiana Pacers	35	47	.427	20.0	25–16	10–31	14–16
Chicago Bulls	34	48	.415	21.0	22–19	12–29	12–17
Cleveland Cavaliers	15	67	.183	40.0	9–32	6–35	5–25

#	Eastern Conference				
#	Team	W	L	PCT	GB
1	z-Boston Celtics	63	19	.768	–
2	y-Milwaukee Bucks	55	27	.671	8
3	x-Philadelphia 76ers	58	24	.707	5
4	x-New Jersey Nets	44	38	.537	19
5	x-Washington Bullets	43	39	.524	20
6	x-Atlanta Hawks	42	40	.512	21
7	Detroit Pistons	39	43	.476	24
8	Indiana Pacers	35	47	.427	28
9	Chicago Bulls	34	48	.415	29
10	New York Knicks	33	49	.402	30
11	Cleveland Cavaliers	15	67	.183	48

z - clinched division title
y - clinched division title
x - clinched playoff spot

== Player statistics ==
Legend
GP	Games played	GS	Games started	MPG	Minutes per game
FG%	Field-goal percentage	3P%	3-point field-goal percentage	FT%	Free-throw percentage
RPG	Rebounds per game	APG	Assists per game	SPG	Steals per game
BPG	Blocks per game	PPG	Points per game

== Awards and records ==
- Artis Gilmore, NBA All-Star Game

== See also ==
- 1981-82 NBA season
