= 1981–82 Atlanta Hawks season =

NBA professional basketball team season

- Head coach: Kevin Loughery
- General manager: Stan Kasten
- Owner: Ted Turner
- Arena: The Omni

Results
- Record: 42–40 (.512)
- Place: Division: 2nd (Central); Conference: 6th (Eastern)
- Playoff finish: First round (lost to 76ers 0–2)
- Stats at Basketball Reference

Local media
- Television: WTBS; SuperStation WTBS
- Radio: WSB

The 1981–82 Atlanta Hawks season was the Hawks' 33rd season in the NBA and 14th season in Atlanta.

== Draft picks ==
Round	Pick	Player	Position	Nationality	College
1	4	Al Wood	SF/SG	United States	North Carolina
2	38	Clyde Bradshaw		United States	DePaul
3	52	Rudy Macklin	SF/SG	United States	Louisiana State
4	75	Kevin Figaro		United States	Louisiana-Lafayette
5	98	Steve Krafscisin		United States	Iowa
6	121	Darryl Warwick		United States	Hampton
7	144	Kevin Vesey		United States	Iona
8	167	Gilbert Salinas		Mexico; United States	Notre Dame
9	189	Howard Thompkins		United States	Wagner
10	209	Mike Frazier		United States	Georgetown

== Roster ==
1981–82 Atlanta Hawks roster
Players

Pos.	No.	Player	Height	Weight	DOB	From
G	22	John Drew	6 ft 6 in (1.98 m)	205 lb (93 kg)		Gardner–Webb
G	34	Mike Glenn	6 ft 2 in (1.88 m)	175 lb (79 kg)		Southern Illinois
C	10	Steve Hawes	6 ft 9 in (2.06 m)	220 lb (100 kg)		Washington
G	3	Eddie Johnson	6 ft 2 in (1.88 m)	180 lb (82 kg)		Auburn
SF	40	Rudy Macklin	6 ft 7 in (2.01 m)	205 lb (93 kg)		LSU
G	1	Wes Matthews	6 ft 1 in (1.85 m)	170 lb (77 kg)		Wisconsin
G	33	Jim McElroy	6 ft 3 in (1.91 m)	190 lb (86 kg)		Central Michigan
C	54	Tom McMillen	6 ft 11 in (2.11 m)	215 lb (98 kg)		Maryland
C	30	Tree Rollins	7 ft 1 in (2.16 m)	235 lb (107 kg)		Clemson
F	32	Dan Roundfield	6 ft 8 in (2.03 m)	205 lb (93 kg)		Central Michigan
PG	2	Rory Sparrow	6 ft 2 in (1.88 m)	175 lb (79 kg)		Villanova
G	20	Freeman Williams	6 ft 4 in (1.93 m)	185 lb (84 kg)		Portland State

Coaches
Head coach
- Kevin Loughery
Assistant(s)
- Mike Fratello

Legend
- (DP) Unsigned draft pick
- (FA) Free agent
- (S) Suspended
- Injured

== Regular season ==
=== Season standings ===
Central Division	W	L	PCT	GB	Home	Road	Div
y-Milwaukee Bucks	55	27	.671	–	31–10	24–17	24–6
x-Atlanta Hawks	42	40	.512	13.0	24–17	18–23	15–14
Detroit Pistons	39	43	.476	16.0	23–18	16–25	19–11
Indiana Pacers	35	47	.427	20.0	25–16	10–31	14–16
Chicago Bulls	34	48	.415	21.0	22–19	12–29	12–17
Cleveland Cavaliers	15	67	.183	40.0	9–32	6–35	5–25

#	Eastern Conference				
#	Team	W	L	PCT	GB
1	z-Boston Celtics	63	19	.768	–
2	y-Milwaukee Bucks	55	27	.671	8
3	x-Philadelphia 76ers	58	24	.707	5
4	x-New Jersey Nets	44	38	.537	19
5	x-Washington Bullets	43	39	.524	20
6	x-Atlanta Hawks	42	40	.512	21
7	Detroit Pistons	39	43	.476	24
8	Indiana Pacers	35	47	.427	28
9	Chicago Bulls	34	48	.415	29
10	New York Knicks	33	49	.402	30
11	Cleveland Cavaliers	15	67	.183	48

z - clinched division title
y - clinched division title
x - clinched playoff spot

== Game log ==
=== Regular season ===
1981–82 game log
Total: 42–40 (home: 24–17; road: 18–23)
October: 0–1 (home: 0–1; road: 0–0)

Game	Date	Team	Score	High points	High rebounds	High assists	Location Attendance	Record
1	October 31	Philadelphia						

November: 8–4 (home: 4–3; road: 4–1)

Game	Date	Team	Score	High points	High rebounds	High assists	Location Attendance	Record
4	November 6	@ Philadelphia						
13	November 28	Boston						

December: 4–11 (home: 2–4; road: 2–7)

Game	Date	Team	Score	High points	High rebounds	High assists	Location Attendance	Record
14	December 1	Philadelphia						
19	December 11	@ Boston						
20	December 12	Boston						
24	December 20	@ Los Angeles						
26	December 26	@ San Antonio						

January: 7–6 (home: 4–2; road: 3–4)

Game	Date	Team	Score	High points	High rebounds	High assists	Location Attendance	Record
33	January 13	@ Boston						
34	January 15	@ Philadelphia						
38	January 22	San Antonio						

February: 5–8 (home: 1–5; road: 4–3)

Game	Date	Team	Score	High points	High rebounds	High assists	Location Attendance	Record
45	February 9	Los Angeles						

March: 12–5 (home: 8–1; road: 4–4)

Game	Date	Team	Score	High points	High rebounds	High assists	Location Attendance	Record
56	March 5	@ Philadelphia						
63	March 17	@ Boston						

April: 6–5 (home: 5–1; road: 1–4)

Game	Date	Team	Score	High points	High rebounds	High assists	Location Attendance	Record
73	April 2	Boston						
77	April 9	Philadelphia						

1981–82 schedule

=== Playoffs ===
1982 playoff game log
First round: 0–2 (home: 0–1; road: 0–1)

Game	Date	Team	Score	High points	High rebounds	High assists	Location Attendance	Series
1	April 21	@ Philadelphia	L 76–111	John Drew (18)	Dan Roundfield (11)	Rory Sparrow (8)	Spectrum; 11,250	1–0
2	April 23	Philadelphia	W 95–98 (OT)	Dan Roundfield (29)	Dan Roundfield (11)	Eddie Johnson (4)	Omni Coliseum; 8,703	2–0

1982 schedule

== Player statistics ==
Legend
GP	Games played	GS	Games started	MPG	Minutes per game
FG%	Field-goal percentage	3P%	3-point field-goal percentage	FT%	Free-throw percentage
RPG	Rebounds per game	APG	Assists per game	SPG	Steals per game
BPG	Blocks per game	PPG	Points per game

=== Season ===
Player	GP	GS	MPG	FG%	3FG%	FT%	RPG	APG	SPG	BPG	PPG
Dan Roundfield	61	58	36.3	46.6	20.0	76.0	11.8	2.7	1.0	1.5	18.6
John Drew	70	51	29.1	48.6	33.3	74.1	5.4	1.4	0.9	0.0	18.5
Eddie Johnson	68	57	34.0	45.0	23.3	76.4	2.8	5.3	1.5	0.2	17.8
Rory Sparrow	82	82	31.8	50.1	6.7	83.8	2.7	5.2	1.1	0.2	10.5
Tom McMillen	73	23	24.5	50.9	33.3	82.4	4.6	1.8	0.3	0.3	9.9
Steve Hawes	49	42	26.9	48.1	40.0	76.2	6.5	2.9	0.7	0.7	9.3
Charlie Criss	27	0	20.4	40.0	25.0	89.0	1.4	2.8	0.9	0.1	8.7
Mike Glenn	49	0	17.0	54.3	50.0	88.1	1.2	1.8	0.5	0.1	7.7
Rudy Macklin	79	32	19.2	43.4	0.0	77.5	3.3	0.6	0.5	0.3	7.0
Wes Matthews	47	5	17.8	44.0	25.0	75.9	1.2	3.0	1.1	0.0	6.9
Jim McElroy	20	17	17.5	41.6	20.0	80.6	0.9	2.0	0.4	0.2	6.7
Tree Rollins	79	39	25.5	58.4	0.0	61.2	7.7	0.7	0.4	2.8	6.1
Al Wood	19	0	12.5	34.3	0.0	71.4	2.3	0.6	0.5	0.1	4.8
Freeman Williams	23	0	8.2	38.2	20.0	84.6	0.5	0.8	0.3	0.0	4.8
Sam Pellom	69	4	15.0	45.4	0.0	77.2	3.3	0.4	0.4	0.7	4.2
Craig Shelton	4	0	5.3	33.3	0.0	50.0	0.8	0.0	0.3	0.0	1.3

=== Playoffs ===
Player	GP	GS	MPG	FG%	3FG%	FT%	RPG	APG	SPG	BPG	PPG
Dan Roundfield	2		42.5	47.2	0.0	57.1	11.0	1.0	1.0	2.0	21.0
John Drew	2		29.5	36.4	0.0	58.3	5.0	0.5	0.0	0.0	11.5
Eddie Johnson	2		33.5	34.6	0.0	100.0	3.0	4.5	0.0	0.5	11.0
Tom McMillen	2		23.5	61.5	0.0	66.7	3.5	0.5	1.5	0.0	10.0
Rory Sparrow	2		34.5	41.7	0.0	100.0	4.0	5.5	1.0	0.0	7.0
Rudy Macklin	2		15.0	50.0	0.0	100.0	1.5	0.5	0.0	0.0	7.0
Steve Hawes	1		12.0	40.0	0.0	75.0	5.0	0.0	0.0	0.0	7.0
Mike Glenn	2		17.5	71.4	0.0	100.0	0.5	1.0	1.5	0.0	6.0
Wes Matthews	2		14.0	20.0	0.0	100.0	0.0	2.0	0.0	0.5	4.0
Tree Rollins	2		32.5	33.3	0.0	75.0	4.0	1.0	0.0	3.0	3.5
Sam Pellom	1		4.0	33.3	0.0	0.0	1.0	0.0	0.0	0.0	2.0
Freeman Williams	1		4.0	0.0	0.0	0.0	0.0	0.0	0.0	0.0	0.0

Player statistics citation:

== Awards and records ==
- Dan Roundfield, NBA All-Defensive First Team

== See also ==
- 1981-82 NBA season
