= List of 1982–83 NBA season transactions =

This is a list of all personnel changes that occurred during the 1982 National Basketball Association (NBA) off-season and 1982–83 NBA season.

== Major transactions ==
This is a list of all major transactions which occurred in the 1982–83 NBA season.

=== Players becoming free agents ===
This is a list of players who gained Free agency:

Player	Date	Player	Date
Paul Westphal	June 27, 1983	Michael Wiley	October 22, 1982
Toby Knight	June 8, 1983	Rich Yonakor	October 22, 1982
Sam Lacey	May 20, 1983	Jim Zoet	October 21, 1982
Billy Ray Bates	April 22, 1983	Joe Kopicki	October 21, 1982
Jan van Breda Kolff	April 17, 1983	Carl Nicks	October 20, 1982
Steve Mix	April 13, 1983	Mike Newlin	October 20, 1982
Geff Crompton	April 9, 1983	Perry Moss	October 18, 1982
Mike Bratz	March 26, 1983	Bob Elliott	October 17, 1982
Jeff Judkins	March 24, 1983	Panayoti Giannakis	October 16, 1982
Larry Kenon	March 23, 1983	Tony Guy	October 16, 1982
Larry Spriggs	March 22, 1983	Howard Wood	October 13, 1982
Randy Smith	March 17, 1983	John Duren	October 13, 1982
Mike Bratz	March 16, 1983	Kevin Boyle	October 13, 1982
Mike Davis	March 15, 1983	Cedrick Hordges	October 12, 1982
Geff Crompton	March 14, 1983	Walter Daniels	October 12, 1982
Larry Spriggs	March 12, 1983	Bobby Cattage	October 11, 1982
Spencer Haywood	March 11, 1983	Clarence Kea	October 11, 1982
Mike Davis	March 5, 1983	Kevin McKenna	October 11, 1982
Lowes Moore	February 18, 1983	Dan Callandrillo	October 10, 1982
Bill Willoughby	February 12, 1983	Keith Herron	October 10, 1982
Lowes Moore	February 8, 1983	Charles Thompson	October 9, 1982
Coby Dietrick	February 7, 1983	Francois Wise	October 9, 1982
Guy Morgan	February 2, 1983	Lynden Rose	October 9, 1982
Chubby Cox	January 31, 1983	Maurice Williams	October 9, 1982
Coby Dietrick	January 28, 1983	Alex Bradley	October 8, 1982
John Lucas	January 27, 1983	Ron Davis	October 8, 1982
Chubby Cox	January 21, 1983	Sam Worthen	October 8, 1982
Joe Hassett	January 20, 1983	Jim Chones	October 7, 1982
Kevin Porter	January 20, 1983	Mike Sanders	October 6, 1982
Paul Mokeski	January 13, 1983	DeWayne Scales	October 3, 1982
Dave Magley	January 9, 1983	Sonny Parker	September 30, 1982
Dwight Anderson	January 9, 1983	Geff Crompton	September 29, 1982
Jim Smith	January 9, 1983	Billy Ray Bates	September 22, 1982
Sam Pellom	January 7, 1983	Kenny Higgs	September 19, 1982
Paul Mokeski	January 3, 1983	John Lambert	August 8, 1982
Craig Dykema	December 23, 1982	Armond Hill	July 1, 1982
Freeman Williams	December 23, 1982	Bernard King	July 1, 1982
Scott Lloyd	December 23, 1982	Bill Laimbeer	July 1, 1982
Armond Hill	December 22, 1982	Bill Robinzine	July 1, 1982
Hutch Jones	December 22, 1982	Bill Willoughby	July 1, 1982
J.J. Anderson	December 22, 1982	Bob Gross	July 1, 1982
Paul Mokeski	December 22, 1982	Bob Lanier	July 1, 1982
Sam Pellom	December 22, 1982	Bob McAdoo	July 1, 1982
Scott May	December 22, 1982	Brad Holland	July 1, 1982
Jim Johnstone	December 16, 1982	Brian Taylor	July 1, 1982
Steve Lingenfelter	December 12, 1982	Carl Bailey	July 1, 1982
Hank McDowell	December 8, 1982	Charlie Criss	July 1, 1982
Joe Cooper	December 6, 1982	Cliff Robinson	July 1, 1982
Billy Ray Bates	December 3, 1982	Clint Richardson	July 1, 1982
Jim Zoet	November 26, 1982	Coby Dietrick	July 1, 1982
Larry Kenon	November 25, 1982	Dave Corzine	July 1, 1982
Leon Douglas	November 21, 1982	Dave Cowens	July 1, 1982
Robert Smith	November 19, 1982	Don Buse	July 1, 1982
Jeff Jones	November 15, 1982	Dudley Bradley	July 1, 1982
Calvin Garrett	November 14, 1982	Edgar Jones	July 1, 1982
Terry Duerod	November 11, 1982	Ernie Grunfeld	July 1, 1982
Joe Cooper	November 10, 1982	Hollis Copeland	July 1, 1982
John Douglas	November 6, 1982	James Hardy	July 1, 1982
Charles Pittman	November 1, 1982	James Silas	July 1, 1982
Chuck Nevitt	November 1, 1982	Jan van Breda Kolff	July 1, 1982
Mike Evans	November 1, 1982	Jeff Cook	July 1, 1982
Carlos Terry	October 30, 1982	Jeff Judkins	July 1, 1982
Eric Fernsten	October 30, 1982	Jim Brewer	July 1, 1982
Garry Witts	October 30, 1982	Jim McElroy	July 1, 1982
Kevin Porter	October 30, 1982	Joe C. Meriweather	July 1, 1982
Lowes Moore	October 30, 1982	John Roche	July 1, 1982
Ray Blume	October 30, 1982	Johnny Davis	July 1, 1982
Reggie Carter	October 30, 1982	Johnny Moore	July 1, 1982
Tom Burleson	October 30, 1982	Kermit Washington	July 1, 1982
Eddie Hughes	October 29, 1982	Kevin Kunnert	July 1, 1982
George McGinnis	October 29, 1982	Kevin Restani	July 1, 1982
Jim Smith	October 29, 1982	Larry Demic	July 1, 1982
Joe Kopicki	October 29, 1982	Larry Wright	July 1, 1982
Mike Harper	October 29, 1982	Louis Orr	July 1, 1982
Tony Brown	October 29, 1982	Mark Landsberger	July 1, 1982
James Wilkes	October 28, 1982	Mike Bantom	July 1, 1982
Jawann Oldham	October 28, 1982	Mike Bratz	July 1, 1982
John Schweitz	October 28, 1982	Mike Dunleavy Sr.	July 1, 1982
Mike Davis	October 28, 1982	Mike Evans	July 1, 1982
Nick Morken	October 28, 1982	Moses Malone	July 1, 1982
Ron Baxter	October 28, 1982	Ollie Johnson	July 1, 1982
Terry Duerod	October 28, 1982	Paul Westphal	July 1, 1982
U.S. Reed	October 28, 1982	Randy Smith	July 1, 1982
Willie Redden	October 28, 1982	Reggie Theus	July 1, 1982
Chris Ford	October 27, 1982	Rich Yonakor	July 1, 1982
Hutch Jones	October 27, 1982	Ricky Sobers	July 1, 1982
Alan Hardy	October 26, 1982	Rock Lee	July 1, 1982
John Greig	October 26, 1982	Ron Lee	July 1, 1982
John Johnson	October 26, 1982	Ronnie Valentine	July 1, 1982
Mike Wilson	October 26, 1982	Rory Sparrow	July 1, 1982
Steve Trumbo	October 25, 1982	Sam Lacey	July 1, 1982
Terry White	October 25, 1982	Sam Pellom	July 1, 1982
Ricky Frazier	October 24, 1982	Steve Mix	July 1, 1982
Art Housey	October 22, 1982	T.R. Dunn	July 1, 1982
Hawkeye Whitney	October 22, 1982	Tom LaGarde	July 1, 1982
Larry Spriggs	October 22, 1982	Wally Walker	July 1, 1982

=== Other major transactions ===
Other major player transactions from July 1982 to June 1982 are:

- July 7:
  - The New York Knicks traded Maurice Lucas to the Phoenix Suns for Truck Robinson.
- July 22:
  - The San Antonio Spurs traded Dave Corzine, Mark Olberding and cash to the Chicago Bulls for Artis Gilmore.
- July 23:
  - The Portland Trail Blazers waived Carl Bailey.
- August 1:
  - The San Antonio Spurs waived John Lambert.
  - The Philadelphia 76ers signed Marc Iavaroni as a free agent.
- August 2:
  - The Portland Trail Blazers signed Jeff Judkins as a veteran free agent and sent a 1984 third-round draft pick (Tim Kearney was later selected) to the Detroit Pistons as compensation.
- August 16:
  - The Indiana Pacers signed Marty Byrnes as a veteran free agent.
- August 27:
  - The Philadelphia 76ers traded Darryl Dawkins to the New Jersey Nets for a 1983 first-round draft pick (Leo Rautins was later selected).
- August 31:
  - The Dallas Mavericks waived Tom LaGarde.
- September:
  - The Washington Bullets signed Dave Batton as a free agent.
- September 2:
  - The Atlanta Hawks traded John Drew and Freeman Williams to the Utah Jazz for Dominique Wilkins.
- September 9:
  - The Boston Celtics traded Dave Cowens to the Milwaukee Bucks for Quinn Buckner.
- September 10:
  - The New York Knicks signed Ernie Grunfeld as a veteran free agent.
- September 13:
  - The Milwaukee Bucks signed Steve Mix as a veteran free agent.
- September 15:
  - The Houston Rockets traded Moses Malone to the Philadelphia 76ers for Caldwell Jones and a 1983 first-round draft pick (Rodney McCray was later selected).
  - The Houston Rockets signed Moses Malone to a multi-year contract. (Houston matched offer sheet signed with Philadelphia.)
- September 20:
  - The Los Angeles Lakers signed Joe Cooper as a free agent.
  - The Portland Trail Blazers waived Billy Ray Bates.
- September 22:
  - The Indiana Pacers traded Tom Owens to the Detroit Pistons for a 1984 second-round draft pick (Greg Wiltjer was later selected).
- September 27:
  - The San Antonio Spurs traded George T. Johnson to the Atlanta Hawks for Jim Johnstone, a 1983 second-round draft pick (Darrell Lockhart was later selected) and a 1985 second-round draft pick (Manute Bol was later selected).
  - The Milwaukee Bucks signed Charlie Criss as a veteran free agent.
  - The Milwaukee Bucks waived Geoff Crompton.
- September 29:
  - The Washington Bullets signed Billy Ray Bates as a free agent.
- September 30:
  - The New Jersey Nets traded Ed Sherod to the New York Knicks for a 1983 third-round draft pick (Bruce Kuczenski was later selected).
- October:
  - The San Antonio Spurs waived Rich Yonakor.
  - The New York Knicks waived DeWayne Scales.
- October 1:
  - The Washington Bullets released Dwight Anderson.
- October 2:
  - The Chicago Bulls signed Dudley Bradley as a veteran free agent.
- October 4:
  - The Kansas City Kings waived Mike Sanders.
- October 5:
  - The Seattle SuperSonics traded Wally Walker to the Houston Rockets for a 1984 second-round draft pick (Cory Blackwell was later selected).
- October 6:
  - The New York Knicks waived Alex Bradley.
- October 7:
  - The Detroit Pistons traded Steve Hayes to the Cleveland Cavaliers for a 1986 second-round draft pick (Dennis Rodman was later selected).
  - The Utah Jazz waived Bobby Cattage.
- October 8:
  - The Chicago Bulls sold Ray Blume to the San Diego Clippers.
  - The Los Angeles Lakers waived Kevin McKenna.
- October 9:
  - The Dallas Mavericks waived Clarence Kea.
- October 11:
  - The Utah Jazz waived Howard Wood.
  - The Cleveland Cavaliers waived Mike Evans.
- October 12:
  - The Utah Jazz waived John Duren.
- October 15:
  - The Milwaukee Bucks traded Robert Smith to the San Diego Clippers for a 1983 sixth-round draft pick (Russell Todd was later selected).
  - The Boston Celtics waived Perry Moss.
- October 16:
  - The San Antonio Spurs signed Mike Dunleavy Sr. as a veteran free agent and sent a 1983 second-round draft pick (Horace Owens was later selected) to the Houston Rockets as compensation.
- October 18:
  - The New York Knicks waived Mike Newlin.
  - The Milwaukee Bucks signed Armond Hill as a veteran free agent.
  - The San Antonio Spurs signed Bill Willoughby as a veteran free agent and sent a 1985 second-round draft pick (Yvon Joseph was later selected) to the Houston Rockets as compensation.
  - The Utah Jazz waived Carl Nicks.
- October 19:
  - The Indiana Pacers signed John Duren as a free agent.
  - The Atlanta Hawks waived Jim Zoet.
  - The Atlanta Hawks waived Joe Kopicki.
- October 20:
  - The Houston Rockets waived Larry Spriggs.
- October 21:
  - Bill Musselman resigns as head coach for Cleveland Cavaliers, and is replaced by Tom Nissalke.
- October 22:
  - The Detroit Pistons signed Jim Zoet as a free agent.
  - The Indiana Pacers signed Joe Kopicki as a free agent.
  - The Golden State Warriors traded Bernard King to the New York Knicks for Micheal Ray Richardson and a 1984 fifth-round draft pick (Scott McCollum was later selected).
  - The Indiana Pacers traded Louis Orr to the New York Knicks for a 1983 second-round draft pick (Scooter McCray was later selected).
  - The Milwaukee Bucks claimed Chuck Nevitt on waivers from the Houston Rockets.
  - The Cleveland Cavaliers waived Michael Wilson.
  - The Chicago Bulls released Chuck Aleksinas.
- October 25:
  - The Boston Celtics waived Chris Ford.
  - The Cleveland Cavaliers traded Brad Branson to the Indiana Pacers for a 1983 second-round draft pick (Scooter McCray was later selected).
  - The Los Angeles Lakers waived Hutch Jones.
  - The New Jersey Nets waived Tony Brown.
- October 26:
  - The Boston Celtics waived Terry Duerod.
  - The Milwaukee Bucks waived Scott May.
  - The Chicago Bulls waived James Wilkes.
  - The Houston Rockets waived Jawann Oldham.
  - The New York Knicks waived Mike Davis.
  - The Boston Celtics waived John Schweitz.
- October 27:
  - The Indiana Pacers waived George McGinnis.
  - The Portland Trail Blazers waived Mike Harper.
  - The Philadelphia 76ers traded Lionel Hollins to the San Diego Clippers for a 1983 fourth-round draft pick (Kalpatrick Wells was later selected) and a 1984 second-round draft pick (Stuart Gray was later selected).
  - The San Diego Clippers waived Jim Smith.
  - The Indiana Pacers waived Joe Kopicki.
  - The San Diego Clippers waived Eddie Hughes.
- October 28:
  - The Golden State Warriors signed Terry Duerod as a free agent.
  - The San Diego Clippers signed Randy Smith as a veteran free agent.
  - The Washington Bullets waived Carlos Terry.
  - The Cleveland Cavaliers waived Lowes Moore.
  - The Milwaukee Bucks waived Chuck Nevitt.
  - The Boston Celtics waived Eric Fernsten.
- November 4:
  - The San Diego Clippers waived John Douglas.
- November 8:
  - The Los Angeles Lakers waived Joe Cooper.
- November 9:
  - The Golden State Warriors waived Terry Duerod.
- November 10:
  - The New Jersey Nets traded James Bailey to the Houston Rockets for a 1983 second-round draft pick (Horace Owens was later selected) and a 1985 second-round draft pick (Yvon Joseph was later selected).
  - The New Jersey Nets traded Phil Ford and a 1983 second-round draft pick (Ted Kitchel was later selected) to the Milwaukee Bucks for Mickey Johnson and Fred Roberts. Milwaukee received the best of three second-round draft picks in 1983 (all owned by New Jersey).
- November 12:
  - The Houston Rockets waived Calvin Garrett.
- November 16:
  - The Washington Bullets signed Carlos Terry as a free agent.
- November 17:
  - The San Diego Clippers signed Hutch Jones as a free agent and waived Robert Smith.
- November 18:
  - The Washington Bullets signed Joe Cooper as a free agent.
- November 19:
  - The Kansas City Kings waived Leon Douglas.
- November 23:
  - The Chicago Bulls waived Larry Kenon.
- November 24:
  - The Detroit Pistons waived Jim Zoet.
- November 28:
  - The Detroit Pistons signed Scott May as a free agent.
- December 1:
  - The Washington Bullets waived Billy Ray Bates.
- December 2:
  - The Washington Bullets waived Joe Cooper.
- December 5:
  - The Golden State Warriors signed Larry Kenon as a free agent.
- December 6:
  - The Cleveland Cavaliers signed Sam Lacey as a veteran free agent.
- December 8:
  - The Portland Trail Blazers claimed Hank McDowell on waivers from the Golden State Warriors.
- December 10:
  - The Washington Bullets waived Steve Lingenfelter.
- December 14:
  - The San Antonio Spurs waived Jim Johnstone.
- December 15:
  - The Cleveland Cavaliers traded Ron Brewer to the Golden State Warriors for World B. Free.
- December 20:
  - The Detroit Pistons waived Scott May.
  - The Philadelphia 76ers waived J.J. Anderson.
  - The Cleveland Cavaliers waived Paul Mokeski.
  - The Atlanta Hawks waived Sam Pellom.
  - The Milwaukee Bucks waived Armond Hill.
  - The San Diego Clippers waived Hutch Jones.
- December 21:
  - The Dallas Mavericks waived Scott Lloyd.
  - The Phoenix Suns waived Craig Dykema.
  - The Utah Jazz waived Freeman Williams.
- December 23:
  - The Utah Jazz signed J.J. Anderson as a free agent.
- December 24:
  - The Milwaukee Bucks signed Paul Mokeski to the first of two 10-day contracts.
- December 27:
  - The Milwaukee Bucks signed Sam Pellom to a 10-day contract.
- December 28:
  - The Detroit Pistons signed Jim Smith as a free agent.
- December 30:
  - The Denver Nuggets signed Dwight Anderson to a 10-day contract.
- December 31:
  - The Indiana Pacers traded Johnny Davis to the Atlanta Hawks for a 1983 second-round draft pick (Jim Thomas was later selected).
- January 1:
  - The Detroit Pistons signed James Wilkes as a free agent.
- January 7:
  - The Cleveland Cavaliers waived Dave Magley.
  - The Indiana Pacers traded Don Buse to the Portland Trail Blazers for cash. Indiana also received the consultation services of Portland vice president Jon Spolestra.
- January 10:
  - The Golden State Warriors sold Larry Kenon to the Cleveland Cavaliers.
- January 11:
  - The Washington Bullets signed Chubby Cox to the first of two 10-day contracts.
- January 12:
  - The Denver Nuggets signed Mike Evans as a free agent.
- January 13:
  - The Milwaukee Bucks signed Paul Mokeski to a contract for the rest of the season.
- January 14:
  - The Cleveland Cavaliers traded Scott Wedman to the Boston Celtics for Darren Tillis and a 1983 first-round draft pick (Greg Kite was later selected).
- January 18:
  - The Golden State Warriors waived Joe Hassett.
  - The Washington Bullets waived Kevin Porter.
  - The Chicago Bulls traded Coby Dietrick to the San Antonio Spurs for a 1983 fourth-round draft pick (Brant Weidner was later selected).
- January 24:
  - The Washington Bullets signed Ricky Sobers as a veteran free agent and sent a 1983 second-round draft pick (Sidney Lowe was later selected) and a 1985 second-round draft pick (Tyrone Corbin was later selected) to the Chicago Bulls as compensation.
- January 25:
  - The Washington Bullets waived John Lucas.
- January 29:
  - The San Diego Clippers signed Lowes Moore as a free agent.
- January 31:
  - The Indiana Pacers waived Guy Morgan.
- February 6:
  - The New Jersey Nets traded Sleepy Floyd and Mickey Johnson to the Golden State Warriors for Micheal Ray Richardson.
- February 7:
  - The Phoenix Suns signed Charles Pittman as a free agent.
  - The Phoenix Suns traded Jeff Cook, a 1983 first-round draft pick (Roy Hinson was later selected) and a 1983 third-round draft pick (Derrick Hord was later selected) to the Cleveland Cavaliers for James Edwards and a 1983 first-round draft pick (Greg Kite was later selected).
  - The Denver Nuggets traded Rich Kelley to the Utah Jazz for Danny Schayes and cash.
- February 8:
  - The San Antonio Spurs waived Coby Dietrick.
- February 9:
  - The San Antonio Spurs signed Mike Sanders as a free agent.
- February 10:
  - The Detroit Pistons traded Edgar Jones to the San Antonio Spurs for a 1984 second-round draft pick (Eric Turner was later selected) and a 1985 third-round draft pick (Andre Goode was later selected).
  - The San Antonio Spurs waived Bill Willoughby.
- February 12:
  - The New York Knicks traded Scott Hastings and cash to the Atlanta Hawks for Rory Sparrow.
- February 13:
  - In a three-team trade, the Atlanta Hawks traded Steve Hawes to the Seattle SuperSonics; the Detroit Pistons traded a second-round draft pick for 1984 and 1985 (Tony Costner and Lorenzo Charles were later selected) to the Atlanta Hawks; and the Seattle SuperSonics traded Ray Tolbert to the Detroit Pistons.
- February 14:
  - The San Diego Clippers signed Bob Gross as a veteran free agent.
- February 15:
  - The Golden State Warriors traded Rickey Brown to the Atlanta Hawks for a 1984 second-round draft pick (Othell Wilson was later selected).
  - The Indiana Pacers traded Clemon Johnson and a 1984 third-round draft pick (James Banks was later selected) to the Philadelphia 76ers for Russ Schoene, a 1983 first-round draft pick (Mitchell Wiggins was later selected) and a 1984 second-round draft pick (Stuart Gray was later selected).
  - The Kansas City Kings sold Reggie Johnson to the Philadelphia 76ers.
  - The Chicago Bulls traded Dwight Jones to the Los Angeles Lakers for a 1985 second-round draft pick (Adrian Branch was later selected).
- February 16:
  - The Chicago Bulls signed Jawann Oldham as a free agent.
- February 19:
  - The Detroit Pistons signed Jim Johnstone as a free agent.
- February 23:
  - The New York Knicks signed Mike Davis to two 10-day contracts, then signed to a contract for the rest of the season.
- February 24:
  - The Utah Jazz signed Kenny Natt as a free agent.
- March 2:
  - The Chicago Bulls signed Larry Spriggs to the first of two 10-day contracts.
- March 4:
  - The San Antonio Spurs signed Geoff Crompton to a 10-day contract.
- March 8:
  - The San Antonio Spurs traded Mike Bratz to the Chicago Bulls for a 1983 fourth-round draft pick (Brant Weidner was later selected).
- March 9:
  - The Washington Bullets waived Spencer Haywood.
  - The Washington Bullets signed Joe Kopicki as a free agent.
- March 13:
  - The Golden State Warriors reassigned Head Coach Al Attles.
- March 14:
  - The San Antonio Spurs signed Geoff Crompton to a contract for the rest of the season.
- March 15:
  - The San Diego Clippers waived Randy Smith.
- March 18:
  - The Atlanta Hawks signed Randy Smith as a free agent.
- March 21:
  - The Cleveland Cavaliers waived Larry Kenon.
  - The San Diego Clippers signed Joe Cooper as a free agent.
- March 22:
  - The Portland Trail Blazers waived Jeff Judkins.
  - The Chicago Bulls signed Larry Spriggs to a contract for the rest of the season.
- March 23:
  - The San Antonio Spurs signed Robert Smith as a free agent.
- March 25:
  - The New Jersey Nets signed Bill Willoughby as a free agent.
- March 30:
  - The Cleveland Cavaliers signed Carl Nicks as a free agent.
- April:
  - The New York Knicks waived Mike Davis.
  - Paul Griffin retired from the San Antonio Spurs
- April 4:
  - The Houston Rockets waived Billy Paultz.
- April 6:
  - Larry Brown resigns as head coach for New Jersey Nets.
  - The New Jersey Nets appointed Bill Blair as interim head coach.
  - The Los Angeles Lakers signed Billy Ray Bates as a free agent.
  - The San Antonio Spurs signed Billy Paultz as a free agent.
- April 7:
  - The San Antonio Spurs waived Geoff Crompton.
- April 8:
  - The New Jersey Nets hired Stan Albeck as head coach.
- April 11:
  - The Milwaukee Bucks waived Steve Mix.
- April 15:
  - The New Jersey Nets waived Jan van Breda Kolff.
- April 16:
  - The Los Angeles Lakers released Billy Ray Bates.
  - The Los Angeles Lakers signed Steve Mix as a free agent.
- April 18:
  - The Detroit Pistons fired Scotty Robertson as head coach.
- April 20:
  - The San Diego Clippers fired Paul Silas as head coach.
- April 22:
  - Del Harris resigns as head coach for Houston Rockets.
- May 10:
  - The Chicago Bulls fired Paul Westhead as head coach.
- May 12:
  - The Golden State Warriors hired Johnny Bach as head coach.
- May 17:
  - The Detroit Pistons hired Chuck Daly as head coach.
- May 27:
  - The Boston Celtics fired Bill Fitch as head coach.
- June:
  - The New York Knicks waived Toby Knight.
  - The New York Knicks waived Ed Sherod.
- June 1:
  - The Houston Rockets hired Bill Fitch as head coach.
  - The Houston Rockets signed Chuck Nevitt as a free agent.
- June 6:
  - Kevin Loughery resigns as head coach for Atlanta Hawks.
- June 7:
  - The Boston Celtics hired K.C. Jones as head coach.
  - The New Jersey Nets signed Stan Albeck (coach) as a veteran free agent and sent Fred Roberts and a 1983 second-round draft pick (Kevin Williams was later selected) to the San Antonio Spurs as compensation.
- June 8:
  - The Boston Celtics signed John Schweitz as a free agent.
- June 9:
  - The Atlanta Hawks hired Mike Fratello as head coach.
- June 10:
  - The San Antonio Spurs hired Morris McHone as head coach.
- June 20:
  - The New York Knicks waived Paul Westphal.
- June 22:
  - The New Jersey Nets traded Len Elmore to the New York Knicks for a 1984 second-round draft pick (Tom Sluby was later selected).
- June 27:
  - The Phoenix Suns traded Dennis Johnson, a 1983 first-round draft pick (Greg Kite was later selected) and a 1983 third-round draft pick (Winfred King was later selected) to the Boston Celtics for Rick Robey, a 1983 second-round draft pick (Rod Foster was later selected) and a 1983 second-round draft pick (Paul Williams was later selected).
  - The Seattle SuperSonics traded Lonnie Shelton to the Cleveland Cavaliers for a 1983 second-round draft pick (Scooter McCray was later selected).
- June 28:
  - The Chicago Bulls traded Larry Micheaux and Mark Olberding to the Kansas City Kings for Chris McNealy, Ennis Whatley and a 1984 second-round draft pick (Ben Coleman was later selected).
  - The Indiana Pacers traded Mitchell Wiggins to the Chicago Bulls for Sidney Lowe and a 1984 second-round draft pick (Victor Fleming was later selected).
  - The Cleveland Cavaliers traded Larry Andersen and Lee Craft to the San Diego Clippers for a 1985 second-round draft pick (Calvin Duncan was later selected).
- June 29:
  - The Dallas Mavericks traded Dirk Minniefield and a 1987 second-round draft pick (Andrew Kennedy was later selected) to the New Jersey Nets for a 1986 second-round draft pick (Milt Wagner was later selected) and a 1987 second-round draft pick (Steve Alford was later selected).
  - The New York Knicks traded Sly Williams and cash to the Atlanta Hawks for Rudy Macklin.
- June 30:
  - The New York Knicks released Frank Brickowski.

== All transactions ==
This is a list of all transactions occurring in the 1982–83 NBA season.

=== June 1983 ===
Jun 30, 1983

- The Chicago Bulls tendered a qualifying offer to make Mike Bratz a restricted FA.
- The San Antonio Spurs tendered a qualifying offer to make Mike Dunleavy Sr. a restricted FA.
- The Milwaukee Bucks tendered a qualifying offer to make Phil Ford a restricted FA.
- The San Diego Clippers tendered a qualifying offer to make Lionel Hollins a restricted FA.
- The Portland Trail Blazers tendered a qualifying offer to make Calvin Natt a restricted FA.
- The San Antonio Spurs tendered a qualifying offer to make Billy Paultz a restricted FA.
- The Atlanta Hawks tendered a qualifying offer to make Tree Rollins a restricted FA.
- The Portland Trail Blazers exercised their team option to extend the contract of Jim Paxson.
- The New York Knicks renounced their draft rights to make Frank Brickowski an Unrestricted FA.
- The Milwaukee Bucks renounced their free-agent exception rights to Harvey Catchings.

Jun 29, 1983

- Rudy Macklin was acquired by the New York Knicks from the Atlanta Hawks in a trade.
- Tom McMillen was acquired by the Washington Bullets from the Atlanta Hawks in a trade.
- Sly Williams was acquired by the Atlanta Hawks from the New York Knicks in a trade.
- The Atlanta Hawks acquired the draft rights to Randy Wittman from the Washington Bullets in a trade.
- Purvis Short signed a veteran extension with the Golden State Warriors.

Jun 28, 1983 – the 1983 NBA draft took place in New York.

- Mark Olberding was acquired by the Kansas City Kings from the Chicago Bulls in a trade.
- The San Diego Clippers acquired the draft rights to Larry Anderson from the Cleveland Cavaliers in a trade.
- The San Diego Clippers acquired the draft rights to Les Craft from the Cleveland Cavaliers in a trade.
- The Indiana Pacers acquired the draft rights to Sidney Lowe from the Chicago Bulls in a trade.
- The Chicago Bulls acquired the draft rights to Chris McNealy from the Kansas City Kings in a trade.
- The Kansas City Kings acquired the draft rights to Larry Micheaux from the Chicago Bulls in a trade.
- The Chicago Bulls acquired the draft rights to Ennis Whatley from the Kansas City Kings in a trade.
- The Chicago Bulls acquired the draft rights to Mitchell Wiggins from the Indiana Pacers in a trade.
- The Houston Rockets selected Ralph Sampson in round 1 with pick 1 in the 1983 NBA draft.
- The Indiana Pacers selected Steve Stipanovich in round 1 with pick 2 in the 1983 NBA draft.
- The Houston Rockets selected Rodney McCray in round 1 with pick 3 in the 1983 NBA draft.
- The San Diego Clippers selected Byron Scott in round 1 with pick 4 in the 1983 NBA draft.
- The Chicago Bulls selected Sidney Green in round 1 with pick 5 in the 1983 NBA draft.
- The Golden State Warriors selected Russell Cross in round 1 with pick 6 in the 1983 NBA draft.
- The Utah Jazz selected Thurl Bailey in round 1 with pick 7 in the 1983 NBA draft.
- The Detroit Pistons selected Antoine Carr in round 1 with pick 8 in the 1983 NBA draft.
- The Dallas Mavericks selected Dale Ellis in round 1 with pick 9 in the 1983 NBA draft.
- The Washington Bullets selected Jeff Malone in round 1 with pick 10 in the 1983 NBA draft.
- The Dallas Mavericks selected Derek Harper in round 1 with pick 11 in the 1983 NBA draft.
- The New York Knicks selected Darrell Walker in round 1 with pick 12 in the 1983 NBA draft.
- The Kansas City Kings selected Ennis Whatley in round 1 with pick 13 in the 1983 NBA draft.
- The Portland Trail Blazers selected Clyde Drexler in round 1 with pick 14 in the 1983 NBA draft.
- The Denver Nuggets selected Howard Carter in round 1 with pick 15 in the 1983 NBA draft.
- The Seattle SuperSonics selected Jon Sundvold in round 1 with pick 16 in the 1983 NBA draft.
- The Philadelphia 76ers selected Leo Rautins in round 1 with pick 17 in the 1983 NBA draft.
- The Milwaukee Bucks selected Randy Breuer in round 1 with pick 18 in the 1983 NBA draft.
- The San Antonio Spurs selected John Paxson in round 1 with pick 19 in the 1983 NBA draft.
- The Cleveland Cavaliers selected Roy Hinson in round 1 with pick 20 in the 1983 NBA draft.
- The Boston Celtics selected Greg Kite in round 1 with pick 21 in the 1983 NBA draft.
- The Washington Bullets selected Randy Wittman in round 1 with pick 22 in the 1983 NBA draft.
- The Indiana Pacers selected Mitchell Wiggins in round 1 with pick 23 in the 1983 NBA draft.
- The Cleveland Cavaliers selected Stewart Granger in round 1 with pick 24 in the 1983 NBA draft.
- The Chicago Bulls selected Sidney Lowe in round 2 with pick 1 in the 1983 NBA draft.
- The Indiana Pacers selected Leroy Combs in round 2 with pick 2 in the 1983 NBA draft.
- The Cleveland Cavaliers selected John Garris in round 2 with pick 3 in the 1983 NBA draft.
- The Phoenix Suns selected Rod Foster in round 2 with pick 4 in the 1983 NBA draft.
- The Chicago Bulls selected Larry Micheaux in round 2 with pick 5 in the 1983 NBA draft.
- The Dallas Mavericks selected Mark West in round 2 with pick 6 in the 1983 NBA draft.
- The Atlanta Hawks selected Doc Rivers in round 2 with pick 7 in the 1983 NBA draft.
- The Washington Bullets selected Michael Britt in round 2 with pick 8 in the 1983 NBA draft.
- The Dallas Mavericks selected Dirk Minniefield in round 2 with pick 9 in the 1983 NBA draft.
- The Washington Bullets selected Guy Williams in round 2 with pick 10 in the 1983 NBA draft.
- The San Antonio Spurs selected Darrell Lockhart in round 2 with pick 11 in the 1983 NBA draft.
- The Seattle SuperSonics selected Scooter McCray in round 2 with pick 12 in the 1983 NBA draft.
- The Denver Nuggets selected David Russell in round 2 with pick 13 in the 1983 NBA draft.
- The Kansas City Kings selected Chris McNealy in round 2 with pick 14 in the 1983 NBA draft.
- The Portland Trail Blazers selected Granville Waiters in round 2 with pick 15 in the 1983 NBA draft.
- The Indiana Pacers selected Jim Thomas in round 2 with pick 16 in the 1983 NBA draft.
- The Milwaukee Bucks selected Ted Kitchel in round 2 with pick 17 in the 1983 NBA draft.
- The Milwaukee Bucks selected Mike Davis in round 2 with pick 18 in the 1983 NBA draft.
- The Golden State Warriors selected Pace Mannion in round 2 with pick 19 in the 1983 NBA draft.
- The New Jersey Nets selected Horace Owens in round 2 with pick 20 in the 1983 NBA draft.
- The Phoenix Suns selected Paul Williams in round 2 with pick 21 in the 1983 NBA draft.
- The San Antonio Spurs selected Kevin Williams in round 2 with pick 22 in the 1983 NBA draft.
- The Philadelphia 76ers selected Ken Lyons in round 2 with pick 23 in the 1983 NBA draft.
- The Houston Rockets selected Craig Ehlo in round 3 with pick 1 in the 1983 NBA draft.
- The Indiana Pacers selected Greg Jones in round 3 with pick 2 in the 1983 NBA draft.
- The Cleveland Cavaliers selected Paul Thompson in round 3 with pick 3 in the 1983 NBA draft.
- The Phoenix Suns selected Derek Whittenburg in round 3 with pick 4 in the 1983 NBA draft.
- The Boston Celtics selected Winfred King in round 3 with pick 5 in the 1983 NBA draft.
- The Golden State Warriors selected Mike Holton in round 3 with pick 6 in the 1983 NBA draft.
- The Utah Jazz selected Bobby Hansen in round 3 with pick 7 in the 1983 NBA draft.
- The Detroit Pistons selected Erich Santifer in round 3 with pick 8 in the 1983 NBA draft.
- The Cleveland Cavaliers selected Larry Anderson in round 3 with pick 9 in the 1983 NBA draft.
- The Washington Bullets selected Darren Daye in round 3 with pick 10 in the 1983 NBA draft.
- The Atlanta Hawks selected John Pinone in round 3 with pick 11 in the 1983 NBA draft.
- The New Jersey Nets selected Bruce Kuczenski in round 3 with pick 12 in the 1983 NBA draft.
- The Kansas City Kings selected Steve Harriel in round 3 with pick 13 in the 1983 NBA draft.
- The Denver Nuggets selected David Little in round 3 with pick 14 in the 1983 NBA draft.
- The Portland Trail Blazers selected Tom Piotrowski in round 3 with pick 15 in the 1983 NBA draft.
- The Seattle SuperSonics selected Frank Burnell in round 3 with pick 16 in the 1983 NBA draft.
- The Philadelphia 76ers selected Claude Riley in round 3 with pick 17 in the 1983 NBA draft.
- The Milwaukee Bucks selected Billy Goodwin in round 3 with pick 18 in the 1983 NBA draft.
- The Cleveland Cavaliers selected Les Craft in round 3 with pick 19 in the 1983 NBA draft.
- The Cleveland Cavaliers selected Derrick Hord in round 3 with pick 20 in the 1983 NBA draft.
- The Boston Celtics selected Craig Robinson in round 3 with pick 21 in the 1983 NBA draft.
- The Los Angeles Lakers selected Orlando Phillips in round 3 with pick 22 in the 1983 NBA draft.
- The Philadelphia 76ers selected Dan Ruland in round 3 with pick 23 in the 1983 NBA draft.
- The Houston Rockets selected Darrell Browder in round 4 with pick 1 in the 1983 NBA draft.
- The Indiana Pacers selected Terry Fair in round 4 with pick 2 in the 1983 NBA draft.
- The Cleveland Cavaliers selected Dwight Jones in round 4 with pick 3 in the 1983 NBA draft.
- The Philadelphia 76ers selected Kalpatrick Wells in round 4 with pick 4 in the 1983 NBA draft.
- The Chicago Bulls selected Ron Crevier in round 4 with pick 5 in the 1983 NBA draft.
- The Utah Jazz selected Doug Arnold in round 4 with pick 6 in the 1983 NBA draft.
- The Golden State Warriors selected Peter Thibeaux in round 4 with pick 7 in the 1983 NBA draft.
- The Detroit Pistons selected Steve Bouchie in round 4 with pick 8 in the 1983 NBA draft.
- The Dallas Mavericks selected Johnny Martin in round 4 with pick 9 in the 1983 NBA draft.
- The Washington Bullets selected Dan Gay in round 4 with pick 10 in the 1983 NBA draft.
- The San Antonio Spurs selected Harry Kelly in round 4 with pick 11 in the 1983 NBA draft.
- The New York Knicks selected Mark Jones in round 4 with pick 12 in the 1983 NBA draft.
- The Denver Nuggets selected York Gross in round 4 with pick 13 in the 1983 NBA draft.
- The Kansas City Kings selected Mike Jackson in round 4 with pick 14 in the 1983 NBA draft.
- The Portland Trail Blazers selected Tim Dunham in round 4 with pick 15 in the 1983 NBA draft.
- The Seattle SuperSonics selected Pete DeBisschop in round 4 with pick 16 in the 1983 NBA draft.
- The New Jersey Nets selected Barney Mines in round 4 with pick 17 in the 1983 NBA draft.
- The Milwaukee Bucks selected Mark Nickens in round 4 with pick 18 in the 1983 NBA draft.
- The Phoenix Suns selected Sam Mosley in round 4 with pick 19 in the 1983 NBA draft.
- The San Antonio Spurs selected Brant Weidner in round 4 with pick 20 in the 1983 NBA draft.
- The Boston Celtics selected Carlos Clark in round 4 with pick 21 in the 1983 NBA draft.
- The Los Angeles Lakers selected Terry Lewis in round 4 with pick 22 in the 1983 NBA draft.
- The Philadelphia 76ers selected Craig Robinson in round 4 with pick 23 in the 1983 NBA draft.
- The Houston Rockets selected Chuck Barnett in round 5 with pick 1 in the 1983 NBA draft.
- The Indiana Pacers selected Roger Stieg in round 5 with pick 2 in the 1983 NBA draft.
- The Cleveland Cavaliers selected Chris Logan in round 5 with pick 3 in the 1983 NBA draft.
- The San Diego Clippers selected Manute Bol in round 5 with pick 4 in the 1983 NBA draft.
- The Chicago Bulls selected Tim Andree in round 5 with pick 5 in the 1983 NBA draft.
- The Golden State Warriors selected Greg Hines in round 5 with pick 6 in the 1983 NBA draft.
- The Utah Jazz selected Mark Clark in round 5 with pick 7 in the 1983 NBA draft.
- The Detroit Pistons selected Ken Austin in round 5 with pick 8 in the 1983 NBA draft.
- The Dallas Mavericks selected Jim Lampley in round 5 with pick 9 in the 1983 NBA draft.
- The Washington Bullets selected Robin Dixon in round 5 with pick 10 in the 1983 NBA draft.
- The Atlanta Hawks selected Charles Jones in round 5 with pick 11 in the 1983 NBA draft.
- The New York Knicks selected Troy Lee Mikell in round 5 with pick 12 in the 1983 NBA draft.
- The Kansas City Kings selected Lorenza Andrews in round 5 with pick 13 in the 1983 NBA draft.
- The Denver Nuggets selected James Braddock in round 5 with pick 14 in the 1983 NBA draft.
- The Portland Trail Blazers selected Gary Monroe in round 5 with pick 15 in the 1983 NBA draft.
- The Seattle SuperSonics selected Brad Watson in round 5 with pick 16 in the 1983 NBA draft.
- The New Jersey Nets selected Tyren Naulls in round 5 with pick 17 in the 1983 NBA draft.
- The Milwaukee Bucks selected Mark Petteway in round 5 with pick 18 in the 1983 NBA draft.
- The San Antonio Spurs selected Jeff Pehl in round 5 with pick 19 in the 1983 NBA draft.
- The Phoenix Suns selected Rick Lamb in round 5 with pick 20 in the 1983 NBA draft.
- The Boston Celtics selected Bob Reitz in round 5 with pick 21 in the 1983 NBA draft.
- The Los Angeles Lakers selected Danny Dixon in round 5 with pick 22 in the 1983 NBA draft.
- The Philadelphia 76ers selected Mike Milligan in round 5 with pick 23 in the 1983 NBA draft.
- The Houston Rockets selected Jim Stack in round 6 with pick 1 in the 1983 NBA draft.
- The Indiana Pacers selected Cliff Pruitt in round 6 with pick 2 in the 1983 NBA draft.
- The Cleveland Cavaliers selected Mel McLaughlin in round 6 with pick 3 in the 1983 NBA draft.
- The Milwaukee Bucks selected Russell Todd in round 6 with pick 4 in the 1983 NBA draft.
- The Chicago Bulls selected Ernest Patterson in round 6 with pick 5 in the 1983 NBA draft.
- The Utah Jazz selected Fred Gilliam in round 6 with pick 6 in the 1983 NBA draft.
- The Golden State Warriors selected Tom Heywood in round 6 with pick 7 in the 1983 NBA draft.
- The Detroit Pistons selected Derek Perry in round 6 with pick 8 in the 1983 NBA draft.
- The Dallas Mavericks selected Billy Allen in round 6 with pick 9 in the 1983 NBA draft.
- The Washington Bullets selected Donald Carroll in round 6 with pick 10 in the 1983 NBA draft.
- The Atlanta Hawks selected Tom Bethea in round 6 with pick 11 in the 1983 NBA draft.
- The New York Knicks selected Tony Simms in round 6 with pick 12 in the 1983 NBA draft.
- The Denver Nuggets selected Glenn Green in round 6 with pick 13 in the 1983 NBA draft.
- The Kansas City Kings selected Alvis Rogers in round 6 with pick 14 in the 1983 NBA draft.
- The Portland Trail Blazers selected Derrick Pope in round 6 with pick 15 in the 1983 NBA draft.
- The Seattle SuperSonics selected Tony Wilson in round 6 with pick 16 in the 1983 NBA draft.
- The New Jersey Nets selected Oscar Taylor in round 6 with pick 17 in the 1983 NBA draft.
- The Milwaukee Bucks selected Charles Hurt in round 6 with pick 18 in the 1983 NBA draft.
- The Phoenix Suns selected Edward Bona in round 6 with pick 19 in the 1983 NBA draft.
- The San Antonio Spurs selected Ricky Hooker in round 6 with pick 20 in the 1983 NBA draft.
- The Boston Celtics selected Paul Atkins in round 6 with pick 21 in the 1983 NBA draft.
- The Los Angeles Lakers selected Mark Steele in round 6 with pick 22 in the 1983 NBA draft.
- The Philadelphia 76ers selected Sedale Threatt in round 6 with pick 23 in the 1983 NBA draft.
- The Houston Rockets selected Brian Kellerman in round 7 with pick 1 in the 1983 NBA draft.
- The Indiana Pacers selected Tony Brown in round 7 with pick 2 in the 1983 NBA draft.
- The Cleveland Cavaliers selected John Columbo in round 7 with pick 3 in the 1983 NBA draft.
- The San Diego Clippers selected Dan Evans in round 7 with pick 4 in the 1983 NBA draft.
- The Chicago Bulls selected Jacque Hill in round 7 with pick 5 in the 1983 NBA draft.
- The Golden State Warriors selected Peter Williams in round 7 with pick 6 in the 1983 NBA draft.
- The Utah Jazz selected Joe Kazanowski in round 7 with pick 7 in the 1983 NBA draft.
- The Detroit Pistons selected Rob Gonzalez in round 7 with pick 8 in the 1983 NBA draft.
- The Dallas Mavericks selected Terrell Schlundt in round 7 with pick 9 in the 1983 NBA draft.
- The Washington Bullets selected Danny Womack in round 7 with pick 10 in the 1983 NBA draft.
- The Atlanta Hawks selected Lex Drum in round 7 with pick 11 in the 1983 NBA draft.
- The New York Knicks selected Desi Barimore in round 7 with pick 12 in the 1983 NBA draft.
- The Kansas City Kings selected Dane Suttle in round 7 with pick 13 in the 1983 NBA draft.
- The Denver Nuggets selected Maurice McDaniel in round 7 with pick 14 in the 1983 NBA draft.
- The Portland Trail Blazers selected Paul Little in round 7 with pick 15 in the 1983 NBA draft.
- The Seattle SuperSonics selected Tony Gattis in round 7 with pick 16 in the 1983 NBA draft.
- The New Jersey Nets selected Keith Bennett in round 7 with pick 17 in the 1983 NBA draft.
- The Milwaukee Bucks selected Anthony Hicks in round 7 with pick 18 in the 1983 NBA draft.
- The San Antonio Spurs selected Keith Williams in round 7 with pick 19 in the 1983 NBA draft.
- The Phoenix Suns selected Fred Brown in round 7 with pick 20 in the 1983 NBA draft.
- The Boston Celtics selected Roy Jackson in round 7 with pick 21 in the 1983 NBA draft.
- The Los Angeles Lakers selected Ricky Mixon in round 7 with pick 22 in the 1983 NBA draft.
- The Philadelphia 76ers selected Tony Bruin in round 7 with pick 23 in the 1983 NBA draft.
- The Houston Rockets selected Jeff Bolding in round 8 with pick 1 in the 1983 NBA draft.
- The Indiana Pacers selected Ray McCallum in round 8 with pick 2 in the 1983 NBA draft.
- The Cleveland Cavaliers selected Larry Tucker in round 8 with pick 3 in the 1983 NBA draft.
- The San Diego Clippers selected Mark Gannon in round 8 with pick 4 in the 1983 NBA draft.
- The Chicago Bulls selected Terry Bradley in round 8 with pick 5 in the 1983 NBA draft.
- The Utah Jazz selected Michael McCombs in round 8 with pick 6 in the 1983 NBA draft.
- The Golden State Warriors selected Doug Harris in round 8 with pick 7 in the 1983 NBA draft.
- The Detroit Pistons selected George Wenzel in round 8 with pick 8 in the 1983 NBA draft.
- The Dallas Mavericks selected Bill Sadler in round 8 with pick 9 in the 1983 NBA draft.
- The Washington Bullets selected Bernard Perry in round 8 with pick 10 in the 1983 NBA draft.
- The Atlanta Hawks selected George Thomas in round 8 with pick 11 in the 1983 NBA draft.
- The New York Knicks selected Mike Lang in round 8 with pick 12 in the 1983 NBA draft.
- The Denver Nuggets selected Cliff Tribus in round 8 with pick 13 in the 1983 NBA draft.
- The Kansas City Kings selected Preston Neumayr in round 8 with pick 14 in the 1983 NBA draft.
- The Portland Trail Blazers selected Frank Smith in round 8 with pick 15 in the 1983 NBA draft.
- The Seattle SuperSonics selected Ray Smith in round 8 with pick 16 in the 1983 NBA draft.
- The New Jersey Nets selected Joe Myers in round 8 with pick 17 in the 1983 NBA draft.
- The Milwaukee Bucks selected Brett Burkholder in round 8 with pick 18 in the 1983 NBA draft.
- The Phoenix Suns selected Mike Mulquin in round 8 with pick 19 in the 1983 NBA draft.
- The San Antonio Spurs selected Norville Brown in round 8 with pick 20 in the 1983 NBA draft.
- The Boston Celtics selected Trent Johnson in round 8 with pick 21 in the 1983 NBA draft.
- The Philadelphia 76ers selected Gordon Austin in round 8 with pick 22 in the 1983 NBA draft.
- The Houston Rockets selected James Campbell in round 9 with pick 1 in the 1983 NBA draft.
- The Indiana Pacers selected Lynn Mitchem in round 9 with pick 2 in the 1983 NBA draft.
- The Cleveland Cavaliers selected Joe Brown in round 9 with pick 3 in the 1983 NBA draft.
- The San Diego Clippers selected David Maxwell in round 9 with pick 4 in the 1983 NBA draft.
- The Chicago Bulls selected Ray Orange in round 9 with pick 5 in the 1983 NBA draft.
- The Golden State Warriors selected Greg Goorjiam in round 9 with pick 6 in the 1983 NBA draft.
- The Utah Jazz selected Ron Webb in round 9 with pick 7 in the 1983 NBA draft.
- The Detroit Pistons selected Marlow McLain in round 9 with pick 8 in the 1983 NBA draft.
- The Dallas Mavericks selected Sherrod Arnold in round 9 with pick 9 in the 1983 NBA draft.
- The Washington Bullets selected Ricky Moreland in round 9 with pick 10 in the 1983 NBA draft.
- The Atlanta Hawks selected Wil Kotchery in round 9 with pick 11 in the 1983 NBA draft.
- The New York Knicks selected Charles Jones in round 9 with pick 12 in the 1983 NBA draft.
- The Kansas City Kings selected Bernard Hill in round 9 with pick 13 in the 1983 NBA draft.
- The Denver Nuggets selected Bobby Van Noy in round 9 with pick 14 in the 1983 NBA draft.
- The Portland Trail Blazers selected Phil Hopson in round 9 with pick 15 in the 1983 NBA draft.
- The Seattle SuperSonics selected Tony Washington in round 9 with pick 16 in the 1983 NBA draft.
- The New Jersey Nets selected Kevin Black in round 9 with pick 17 in the 1983 NBA draft.
- The Milwaukee Bucks selected Bill Varner in round 9 with pick 18 in the 1983 NBA draft.
- The San Antonio Spurs selected Gary Gaspard in round 9 with pick 19 in the 1983 NBA draft.
- The Phoenix Suns selected Joe Dykstra in round 9 with pick 20 in the 1983 NBA draft.
- The Boston Celtics selected John Rice in round 9 with pick 21 in the 1983 NBA draft.
- The Philadelphia 76ers selected Charles Fisher in round 9 with pick 22 in the 1983 NBA draft.
- The Indiana Pacers selected Mark Smed in round 10 with pick 1 in the 1983 NBA draft.
- The Cleveland Cavaliers selected Jon Hanley in round 10 with pick 2 in the 1983 NBA draft.
- The San Diego Clippers selected Keith Smith in round 10 with pick 3 in the 1983 NBA draft.
- The Chicago Bulls selected Tom Emma in round 10 with pick 4 in the 1983 NBA draft.
- The Utah Jazz selected Odell Mosteller in round 10 with pick 5 in the 1983 NBA draft.
- The Golden State Warriors selected Michael Zeno in round 10 with pick 6 in the 1983 NBA draft.
- The Detroit Pistons selected Ike Person in round 10 with pick 7 in the 1983 NBA draft.
- The Dallas Mavericks selected Clyde Corley in round 10 with pick 8 in the 1983 NBA draft.
- The Washington Bullets selected Isiah Singletary in round 10 with pick 9 in the 1983 NBA draft.
- The Atlanta Hawks selected Ronnie Carr in round 10 with pick 10 in the 1983 NBA draft.
- The New York Knicks selected Bernard Randolph in round 10 with pick 11 in the 1983 NBA draft.
- The Denver Nuggets selected Cleveland McCrae in round 10 with pick 12 in the 1983 NBA draft.
- The Kansas City Kings selected Aaron Haskins in round 10 with pick 13 in the 1983 NBA draft.
- The Portland Trail Blazers selected Russ Christianson in round 10 with pick 14 in the 1983 NBA draft.
- The Seattle SuperSonics selected David Binion in round 10 with pick 15 in the 1983 NBA draft.
- The New Jersey Nets selected Rich Simkus in round 10 with pick 16 in the 1983 NBA draft.
- The Milwaukee Bucks selected Bob Kelly in round 10 with pick 17 in the 1983 NBA draft.
- The Phoenix Suns selected Bo Overton in round 10 with pick 18 in the 1983 NBA draft.
- The San Antonio Spurs selected Lamar Heard in round 10 with pick 19 in the 1983 NBA draft.
- The Boston Celtics selected Andy Kupec in round 10 with pick 20 in the 1983 NBA draft.

Jun 27, 1983

- Dennis Johnson was acquired by the Boston Celtics from the Phoenix Suns in a trade.
- Rick Robey was acquired by the Phoenix Suns from the Boston Celtics in a trade.
- Lonnie Shelton was acquired by the Cleveland Cavaliers from the Seattle SuperSonics in a trade.
- Sly Williams signed a multi-year contract with the New York Knicks.
- The New York Knicks matched the offer sheet that Sly Williams signed with the Boston Celtics.
- Paul Westphal, previously with the New York Knicks, became a free agent.

Jun 23, 1983

- Brad Davis signed a veteran extension with the Dallas Mavericks.

Jun 22, 1983

- Len Elmore was acquired by the New York Knicks from the New Jersey Nets in a trade.

Jun 20, 1983

- The New York Knicks placed the contract of Paul Westphal on waivers.
- Mike Gibson signed a contract with the Washington Bullets.
- Sly Williams signed a multi-year offer sheet with the Boston Celtics. Since he is a restricted free agent, the New York Knicks can match.

Jun 16, 1983

- Kevin Magee signed a contract with the Phoenix Suns.

Jun 8, 1983

- John Schweitz signed a multi-year contract with the Boston Celtics.
- Toby Knight, previously with the New York Knicks, became a free agent.

Jun 7, 1983

- The San Antonio Spurs acquired the draft rights to Fred Roberts from the New Jersey Nets in a trade.

Jun 1, 1983

- The New York Knicks placed the contract of Toby Knight on waivers.
- The New York Knicks tendered a qualifying offer to make Sly Williams a restricted FA.

=== May 1983 ===
May 26, 1983

- Craig Hodges signed a veteran extension with the San Diego Clippers.

May 20, 1983

- Sam Lacey, previously with the Cleveland Cavaliers, became a free agent.

May 18, 1983

- The Cleveland Cavaliers placed the contract of Sam Lacey on waivers.

May 7, 1983

- Tony Brown signed a contract with the Detroit Pistons.

=== April 1983 ===
Apr 22, 1983

- Billy Ray Bates, previously with the Los Angeles Lakers, became a free agent.

Apr 17, 1983

- Jan van Breda Kolff, previously with the New Jersey Nets, became a free agent.

Apr 16, 1983

- Steve Mix signed a multi-year contract with the Los Angeles Lakers.

Apr 15, 1983

- The New Jersey Nets placed the contract of Jan van Breda Kolff on waivers.

Apr 13, 1983

- Steve Mix, previously with the Milwaukee Bucks, became a free agent.

Apr 12, 1983

- Billy Ray Bates signed a contract with the Los Angeles Lakers.

Apr 11, 1983

- The Milwaukee Bucks placed the contract of Steve Mix on waivers.

Apr 9, 1983

- Geff Crompton, previously with the San Antonio Spurs, became a free agent.

Apr 7, 1983

- The San Antonio Spurs placed the contract of Geff Crompton on waivers.

Apr 6, 1983

- The San Antonio Spurs made a successful waiver claim for the contract of Billy Paultz.

Apr 4, 1983

- The Houston Rockets placed the contract of Billy Paultz on waivers.

Apr 2, 1983

- Chuck Nevitt signed a multi-year contract with the Houston Rockets.

=== March 1983 ===
Mar 30, 1983

- Carl Nicks signed a multi-year contract with the Cleveland Cavaliers.

Mar 26, 1983

- Mike Bratz signed a contract with the Chicago Bulls.
- Mike Bratz, previously with the Chicago Bulls, became a free agent.

Mar 25, 1983

- Bill Willoughby signed a multi-year contract with the New Jersey Nets.

Mar 24, 1983

- Jeff Judkins, previously with the Portland Trail Blazers, became a free agent.

Mar 23, 1983

- Robert Smith signed a multi-year contract with the San Antonio Spurs.
- Larry Kenon, previously with the Cleveland Cavaliers, became a free agent.

Mar 22, 1983

- The Portland Trail Blazers placed the contract of Jeff Judkins on waivers.
- Larry Spriggs signed a contract with the Chicago Bulls.
- Larry Spriggs, previously with the Chicago Bulls, became a free agent.

Mar 21, 1983

- The Cleveland Cavaliers placed the contract of Larry Kenon on waivers.
- Joe Cooper signed a multi-year contract with the San Diego Clippers.

Mar 18, 1983

- Randy Smith signed a contract with the Atlanta Hawks.

Mar 17, 1983

- Randy Smith, previously with the San Diego Clippers, became a free agent.

Mar 16, 1983

- Mike Bratz signed a contract with the Chicago Bulls.
- Mike Bratz, previously with the Chicago Bulls, became a free agent.

Mar 15, 1983

- The San Diego Clippers placed the contract of Randy Smith on waivers.
- Mike Davis signed a multi-year contract with the New York Knicks.
- Mike Davis, previously with the New York Knicks, became a free agent.

Mar 14, 1983

- Geff Crompton signed a multi-year contract with the San Antonio Spurs.
- Geff Crompton, previously with the San Antonio Spurs, became a free agent.

Mar 12, 1983

- Larry Spriggs signed a contract with the Chicago Bulls.
- Larry Spriggs, previously with the Chicago Bulls, became a free agent.

Mar 11, 1983

- Spencer Haywood, previously with the Washington Bullets, became a free agent.

Mar 9, 1983

- The Washington Bullets placed the contract of Spencer Haywood on waivers.
- Joe Kopicki signed a multi-year contract with the Washington Bullets.

Mar 6, 1983

- Mike Bratz signed a contract with the Chicago Bulls.
- Mike Bratz signed a multi-year offer sheet with the Chicago Bulls. Since he is a restricted free agent, the San Antonio Spurs can match.

Mar 5, 1983

- Mike Davis signed a contract with the New York Knicks.
- Mike Davis, previously with the New York Knicks, became a free agent.

Mar 4, 1983

- Geff Crompton signed a contract with the San Antonio Spurs.

Mar 2, 1983

- Larry Spriggs signed a contract with the Chicago Bulls.

=== February 1983 ===
Feb 24, 1983

- Kenny Natt signed a contract with the Utah Jazz.

Feb 23, 1983

- Mike Davis signed a contract with the New York Knicks.

Feb 19, 1983

- Jim Johnstone signed a contract with the Detroit Pistons.

Feb 18, 1983

- Lowes Moore signed a multi-year contract with the San Diego Clippers.
- Lowes Moore, previously with the San Diego Clippers, became a free agent.

Feb 16, 1983

- Clemon Johnson was acquired by the Philadelphia 76ers from the Indiana Pacers in a trade.
- Jawann Oldham signed a multi-year contract with the Chicago Bulls.

Feb 15, 1983

- Rickey Brown was acquired by the Atlanta Hawks from the Golden State Warriors in a trade.
- Reggie Johnson was acquired by the Philadelphia 76ers from the Kansas City Kings in a trade.
- Dwight Jones was acquired by the Los Angeles Lakers from the Chicago Bulls in a trade.
- Russ Schoene was acquired by the Indiana Pacers from the Philadelphia 76ers in a trade.

Feb 14, 1983

- John Greig signed a contract with the Seattle SuperSonics.
- Bob Gross signed a contract with the San Diego Clippers.

Feb 12, 1983

- Scott Hastings was acquired by the Atlanta Hawks from the New York Knicks in a trade.
- Steve Hawes was acquired by the Seattle SuperSonics from the Atlanta Hawks in a trade.
- Rory Sparrow was acquired by the New York Knicks from the Atlanta Hawks in a trade.
- Ray Tolbert was acquired by the Detroit Pistons from the Seattle SuperSonics in a trade.
- Bill Willoughby, previously with the San Antonio Spurs, became a free agent.

Feb 10, 1983

- The San Antonio Spurs placed the contract of Bill Willoughby on waivers.
- Edgar Jones was acquired by the San Antonio Spurs from the Detroit Pistons in a trade.

Feb 9, 1983

- Mike Sanders signed a multi-year contract with the San Antonio Spurs.

Feb 8, 1983

- Lowes Moore signed a contract with the San Diego Clippers.
- Lowes Moore, previously with the San Diego Clippers, became a free agent.

Feb 7, 1983

- Jeff Cook was acquired by the Cleveland Cavaliers from the Phoenix Suns in a trade.
- James Edwards was acquired by the Phoenix Suns from the Cleveland Cavaliers in a trade.
- Rich Kelley was acquired by the Utah Jazz from the Denver Nuggets in a trade.
- Micheal Ray Richardson was acquired by the New Jersey Nets from the Golden State Warriors in a trade.
- Danny Schayes was acquired by the Denver Nuggets from the Utah Jazz in a trade.
- Charles Pittman signed a multi-year contract with the Phoenix Suns.
- Jan van Breda Kolff signed a multi-year contract with the New Jersey Nets.
- Coby Dietrick, previously with the San Antonio Spurs, became a free agent.

Feb 6, 1983

- Sleepy Floyd was acquired by the Golden State Warriors from the New Jersey Nets in a trade.
- Mickey Johnson was acquired by the Golden State Warriors from the New Jersey Nets in a trade.

Feb 2, 1983

- Guy Morgan, previously with the Indiana Pacers, became a free agent.

=== January 1983 ===
Jan 31, 1983

- The Indiana Pacers placed the contract of Guy Morgan on waivers.
- Chubby Cox, previously with the Washington Bullets, became a free agent.

Jan 29, 1983

- Lowes Moore signed a contract with the San Diego Clippers.

Jan 28, 1983

- Coby Dietrick signed a contract with the San Antonio Spurs.
- Coby Dietrick, previously with the San Antonio Spurs, became a free agent.

Jan 27, 1983

- John Lucas, previously with the Washington Bullets, became a free agent.

Jan 25, 1983

- The Washington Bullets placed the contract of John Lucas on waivers.

Jan 24, 1983

- Ricky Sobers signed a multi-year contract with the Washington Bullets.

Jan 23, 1983

- Ricky Sobers signed a multi-year offer sheet with the Washington Bullets. Since he is a restricted free agent, the Chicago Bulls can match.

Jan 21, 1983

- Chubby Cox signed a contract with the Washington Bullets.
- Chubby Cox, previously with the Washington Bullets, became a free agent.

Jan 20, 1983

- Joe Hassett, previously with the Golden State Warriors, became a free agent.
- Kevin Porter, previously with the Washington Bullets, became a free agent.

Jan 18, 1983

- The Golden State Warriors placed the contract of Joe Hassett on waivers.
- The Washington Bullets placed the contract of Kevin Porter on waivers.
- Coby Dietrick signed a contract with the San Antonio Spurs.

Jan 17, 1983

- Coby Dietrick signed a multi-year offer sheet with the San Antonio Spurs. Since he is a restricted free agent, the Chicago Bulls can match.

Jan 14, 1983

- Darren Tillis was acquired by the Cleveland Cavaliers from the Boston Celtics in a trade.
- Scott Wedman was acquired by the Boston Celtics from the Cleveland Cavaliers in a trade.

Jan 13, 1983

- Paul Mokeski signed a multi-year contract with the Milwaukee Bucks.
- Paul Mokeski, previously with the Milwaukee Bucks, became a free agent.

Jan 12, 1983

- Mike Evans signed a multi-year contract with the Denver Nuggets.

Jan 11, 1983

- Chubby Cox signed a contract with the Washington Bullets.

Jan 10, 1983

- Kurt Rambis signed a veteran extension with the Los Angeles Lakers.

Jan 9, 1983

- Don Buse signed a multi-year contract with the Portland Trail Blazers.
- Dwight Anderson, previously with the Denver Nuggets, became a free agent.
- Dave Magley, previously with the Cleveland Cavaliers, became a free agent.
- Jim Smith, previously with the Detroit Pistons, became a free agent.

Jan 8, 1983

- Larry Kenon was acquired by the Cleveland Cavaliers from the Golden State Warriors in a trade.

Jan 7, 1983

- The Cleveland Cavaliers placed the contract of Dave Magley on waivers.
- Don Buse signed a multi-year offer sheet with the Portland Trail Blazers. Since he is a restricted free agent, the Indiana Pacers can match.
- Sam Pellom, previously with the Milwaukee Bucks, became a free agent.

Jan 3, 1983

- Paul Mokeski signed a contract with the Milwaukee Bucks.
- Paul Mokeski, previously with the Milwaukee Bucks, became a free agent.

Jan 1, 1983

- James Wilkes signed a contract with the Detroit Pistons.

=== December 1982 ===
Dec 31, 1982

- Johnny Davis was acquired by the Atlanta Hawks from the Indiana Pacers in a trade.

Dec 30, 1982

- Dwight Anderson signed a contract with the Denver Nuggets.
- Johnny Davis signed a multi-year contract with the Indiana Pacers.
- Jim Smith signed a contract with the Detroit Pistons.

Dec 28, 1982

- Sam Pellom signed a contract with the Milwaukee Bucks.

Dec 24, 1982

- Paul Mokeski signed a contract with the Milwaukee Bucks.

Dec 23, 1982

- J.J. Anderson signed a multi-year contract with the Utah Jazz.
- Craig Dykema, previously with the Phoenix Suns, became a free agent.
- Scott Lloyd, previously with the Dallas Mavericks, became a free agent.
- Freeman Williams, previously with the Utah Jazz, became a free agent.

Dec 22, 1982

- J.J. Anderson, previously with the Philadelphia 76ers, became a free agent.
- Armond Hill, previously with the Milwaukee Bucks, became a free agent.
- Hutch Jones, previously with the San Diego Clippers, became a free agent.
- Scott May, previously with the Detroit Pistons, became a free agent.
- Paul Mokeski, previously with the Cleveland Cavaliers, became a free agent.
- Sam Pellom, previously with the Atlanta Hawks, became a free agent.

Dec 21, 1982

- The Phoenix Suns placed the contract of Craig Dykema on waivers.
- The Dallas Mavericks placed the contract of Scott Lloyd on waivers.
- The Utah Jazz placed the contract of Freeman Williams on waivers.
- Kevin Porter signed a contract with the Washington Bullets.

Dec 20, 1982

- The Philadelphia 76ers placed the contract of J.J. Anderson on waivers.
- The Milwaukee Bucks placed the contract of Armond Hill on waivers.
- The San Diego Clippers placed the contract of Hutch Jones on waivers.
- The Detroit Pistons placed the contract of Scott May on waivers.
- The Cleveland Cavaliers placed the contract of Paul Mokeski on waivers.
- The Atlanta Hawks placed the contract of Sam Pellom on waivers.
- Alvan Adams signed a veteran extension with the Phoenix Suns.

Dec 16, 1982

- Jim Johnstone, previously with the San Antonio Spurs, became a free agent.

Dec 15, 1982

- Ron Brewer was acquired by the Golden State Warriors from the Cleveland Cavaliers in a trade.
- World B. Free was acquired by the Cleveland Cavaliers from the Golden State Warriors in a trade.

Dec 14, 1982

- The San Antonio Spurs placed the contract of Jim Johnstone on waivers.

Dec 12, 1982

- Steve Lingenfelter, previously with the Washington Bullets, became a free agent.

Dec 10, 1982

- The Washington Bullets placed the contract of Steve Lingenfelter on waivers.

Dec 8, 1982

- Hank McDowell signed a multi-year contract with the Portland Trail Blazers.
- Hank McDowell, previously with the Golden State Warriors, became a free agent.

Dec 6, 1982

- Sam Lacey signed a multi-year contract with the Cleveland Cavaliers.
- Joe Cooper, previously with the Washington Bullets, became a free agent.

Dec 5, 1982

- The Golden State Warriors placed the contract of Hank McDowell on waivers.
- Larry Kenon signed a contract with the Golden State Warriors.

Dec 3, 1982

- Billy Ray Bates, previously with the Washington Bullets, became a free agent.

Dec 2, 1982

- The Washington Bullets placed the contract of Joe Cooper on waivers.

Dec 1, 1982

- The Washington Bullets placed the contract of Billy Ray Bates on waivers.

=== November 1982 ===
Nov 30, 1982

- Sam Pellom signed a contract with the Atlanta Hawks.

Nov 28, 1982

- Scott May signed a contract with the Detroit Pistons.

Nov 26, 1982

- Jim Zoet, previously with the Detroit Pistons, became a free agent.

Nov 25, 1982

- Larry Kenon, previously with the Chicago Bulls, became a free agent.

Nov 24, 1982

- The Detroit Pistons placed the contract of Jim Zoet on waivers.

Nov 23, 1982

- The Chicago Bulls placed the contract of Larry Kenon on waivers.

Nov 21, 1982

- Leon Douglas, previously with the Kansas City Kings, became a free agent.

Nov 19, 1982

- The Kansas City Kings placed the contract of Leon Douglas on waivers.
- Robert Smith, previously with the San Diego Clippers, became a free agent.

Nov 18, 1982

- Joe Cooper signed a contract with the Washington Bullets.

Nov 17, 1982

- The San Diego Clippers placed the contract of Robert Smith on waivers.
- Hutch Jones signed a contract with the San Diego Clippers.

Nov 16, 1982

- Carlos Terry signed a contract with the Washington Bullets.

Nov 15, 1982

- Jeff Jones, previously with the Golden State Warriors, became a free agent.

Nov 14, 1982

- Calvin Garrett, previously with the Houston Rockets, became a free agent.

Nov 13, 1982

- The Golden State Warriors placed the contract of Jeff Jones on waivers.

Nov 12, 1982

- The Houston Rockets placed the contract of Calvin Garrett on waivers.
- Lester Conner signed a multi-year contract with the Golden State Warriors.

Nov 11, 1982

- Terry Duerod, previously with the Golden State Warriors, became a free agent.

Nov 10, 1982

- James Bailey was acquired by the Houston Rockets from the New Jersey Nets in a trade.
- Phil Ford was acquired by the Milwaukee Bucks from the New Jersey Nets in a trade.
- Mickey Johnson was acquired by the New Jersey Nets from the Milwaukee Bucks in a trade.
- The New Jersey Nets acquired the draft rights to Fred Roberts from the Milwaukee Bucks in a trade.
- Joe Cooper, previously with the Los Angeles Lakers, became a free agent.

Nov 9, 1982

- The Golden State Warriors placed the contract of Terry Duerod on waivers.

Nov 8, 1982

- The Los Angeles Lakers placed the contract of Joe Cooper on waivers.

Nov 6, 1982

- John Douglas, previously with the San Diego Clippers, became a free agent.

Nov 5, 1982

- Terry Cummings signed a multi-year contract with the San Diego Clippers.

Nov 4, 1982

- The San Diego Clippers placed the contract of John Douglas on waivers.

Nov 2, 1982

- Bob McAdoo signed a multi-year contract with the Los Angeles Lakers.
- LaSalle Thompson signed a multi-year contract with the Kansas City Kings.

Nov 1, 1982

- Michael Cooper signed a veteran extension with the Los Angeles Lakers.
- Mike Evans, previously with the San Diego Clippers, became a free agent.
- Chuck Nevitt, previously with the Milwaukee Bucks, became a free agent.
- Charles Pittman, previously with the Phoenix Suns, became a free agent.

=== October 1982 ===
Oct 30, 1982

- Ray Blume, previously with the San Diego Clippers, became a free agent.
- Tom Burleson, previously with the Chicago Bulls, became a free agent.
- Reggie Carter, previously with the New York Knicks, became a free agent.
- Eric Fernsten, previously with the Boston Celtics, became a free agent.
- Lowes Moore, previously with the Cleveland Cavaliers, became a free agent.
- Kevin Porter, previously with the Washington Bullets, became a free agent.
- Carlos Terry, previously with the Washington Bullets, became a free agent.
- Garry Witts, previously with the Washington Bullets, became a free agent.

Oct 29, 1982

- Tony Brown, previously with the New Jersey Nets, became a free agent.
- Mike Harper, previously with the Portland Trail Blazers, became a free agent.
- Eddie Hughes, previously with the San Diego Clippers, became a free agent.
- Joe Kopicki, previously with the Indiana Pacers, became a free agent.
- George McGinnis, previously with the Indiana Pacers, became a free agent.
- Jim Smith, previously with the San Diego Clippers, became a free agent.

Oct 28, 1982

- The San Diego Clippers placed the contract of Ray Blume on waivers.
- The Chicago Bulls placed the contract of Tom Burleson on waivers.
- The New York Knicks placed the contract of Reggie Carter on waivers.
- The San Diego Clippers placed the contract of Mike Evans on waivers.
- The Boston Celtics placed the contract of Eric Fernsten on waivers.
- The Cleveland Cavaliers placed the contract of Lowes Moore on waivers.
- The Milwaukee Bucks placed the contract of Chuck Nevitt on waivers.
- The Phoenix Suns placed the contract of Charles Pittman on waivers.
- The Washington Bullets placed the contract of Kevin Porter on waivers.
- The Washington Bullets placed the contract of Carlos Terry on waivers.
- The Washington Bullets placed the contract of Garry Witts on waivers.
- Terry Duerod signed a contract with the Golden State Warriors.
- Randy Smith signed a contract with the San Diego Clippers.
- Ron Baxter, previously with the Golden State Warriors, became a free agent.
- Mike Davis, previously with the New York Knicks, became a free agent.
- Terry Duerod, previously with the Boston Celtics, became a free agent.
- Nick Morken, previously with the Golden State Warriors, became a free agent.
- Jawann Oldham, previously with the Houston Rockets, became a free agent.
- Willie Redden, previously with the San Antonio Spurs, became a free agent.
- U.S. Reed, previously with the San Antonio Spurs, became a free agent.
- John Schweitz, previously with the Boston Celtics, became a free agent.
- James Wilkes, previously with the Chicago Bulls, became a free agent.

Oct 27, 1982

- The Portland Trail Blazers placed the contract of Mike Harper on waivers.
- The San Diego Clippers placed the contract of Eddie Hughes on waivers.
- The Indiana Pacers placed the contract of Joe Kopicki on waivers.
- The Indiana Pacers placed the contract of George McGinnis on waivers.
- The San Diego Clippers placed the contract of Jim Smith on waivers.
- Lionel Hollins was acquired by the San Diego Clippers from the Philadelphia 76ers in a trade.
- Chris Ford, previously with the Boston Celtics, became a free agent.
- Hutch Jones, previously with the Los Angeles Lakers, became a free agent.

Oct 26, 1982

- The Golden State Warriors placed the contract of Ron Baxter on waivers.
- The New York Knicks placed the contract of Mike Davis on waivers.
- The Boston Celtics placed the contract of Terry Duerod on waivers.
- The Milwaukee Bucks placed the contract of Scott May on waivers.
- The Golden State Warriors placed the contract of Nick Morken on waivers.
- The Houston Rockets placed the contract of Jawann Oldham on waivers.
- The San Antonio Spurs placed the contract of Willie Redden on waivers.
- The San Antonio Spurs placed the contract of U.S. Reed on waivers.
- The Boston Celtics placed the contract of John Schweitz on waivers.
- The Chicago Bulls placed the contract of James Wilkes on waivers.
- John Greig, previously with the Seattle SuperSonics, became a free agent.
- Alan Hardy, previously with the Detroit Pistons, became a free agent.
- John Johnson, previously with the Seattle SuperSonics, became a free agent.
- Michael Wilson, previously with the Cleveland Cavaliers, became a free agent.

Oct 25, 1982

- The New Jersey Nets placed the contract of Tony Brown on waivers.
- The Boston Celtics placed the contract of Chris Ford on waivers.
- The Los Angeles Lakers placed the contract of Hutch Jones on waivers.
- Brad Branson was acquired by the Indiana Pacers from the Cleveland Cavaliers in a trade.
- Steve Trumbo, previously with the Utah Jazz, became a free agent.
- Terry White, previously with the Cleveland Cavaliers, became a free agent.

Oct 24, 1982

- The Seattle SuperSonics placed the contract of John Greig on waivers.
- The Detroit Pistons placed the contract of Alan Hardy on waivers.
- The Seattle SuperSonics placed the contract of John Johnson on waivers.
- Ricky Frazier, previously with the Chicago Bulls, became a free agent.

Oct 23, 1982

- The Utah Jazz placed the contract of Steve Trumbo on waivers.
- The Cleveland Cavaliers placed the contract of Terry White on waivers.

Oct 22, 1982

- The Chicago Bulls placed the contract of Ricky Frazier on waivers.
- The Cleveland Cavaliers placed the contract of Michael Wilson on waivers.
- Tom Burleson was acquired by the Chicago Bulls from the Atlanta Hawks in a trade.
- Bernard King was acquired by the New York Knicks from the Golden State Warriors in a trade.
- Micheal Ray Richardson was acquired by the Golden State Warriors from the New York Knicks in a trade.
- The Milwaukee Bucks made a successful waiver claim for the contract of Chuck Nevitt.
- Joe Kopicki signed a contract with the Indiana Pacers.
- Mark Landsberger signed a multi-year contract with the Los Angeles Lakers.
- Louis Orr signed a multi-year contract with the New York Knicks.
- Jim Zoet signed a contract with the Detroit Pistons.
- The Chicago Bulls renounced their draft rights to make Chuck Aleksinas an Unrestricted FA.
- Art Housey, previously with the Phoenix Suns, became a free agent.
- Larry Spriggs, previously with the Houston Rockets, became a free agent.
- Hawkeye Whitney, previously with the Kansas City Kings, became a free agent.
- Michael Wiley, previously with the San Diego Clippers, became a free agent.
- Rich Yonakor, previously with the San Antonio Spurs, became a free agent.

Oct 21, 1982

- Keith Edmonson signed a multi-year contract with the Atlanta Hawks.
- Joe Kopicki, previously with the Atlanta Hawks, became a free agent.
- Jim Zoet, previously with the Atlanta Hawks, became a free agent.

Oct 20, 1982

- The Phoenix Suns placed the contract of Art Housey on waivers.
- The Houston Rockets placed the contract of Chuck Nevitt on waivers.
- The Houston Rockets placed the contract of Larry Spriggs on waivers.
- The Kansas City Kings placed the contract of Hawkeye Whitney on waivers.
- The San Diego Clippers placed the contract of Michael Wiley on waivers.
- The San Antonio Spurs placed the contract of Rich Yonakor on waivers.
- Louis Orr signed a multi-year offer sheet with the New York Knicks. Since he is a restricted free agent, the Indiana Pacers can match.
- Mike Newlin, previously with the New York Knicks, became a free agent.
- Carl Nicks, previously with the Utah Jazz, became a free agent.

Oct 19, 1982

- The Atlanta Hawks placed the contract of Joe Kopicki on waivers.
- The Atlanta Hawks placed the contract of Jim Zoet on waivers.

Oct 18, 1982

- The New York Knicks placed the contract of Mike Newlin on waivers.
- The Utah Jazz placed the contract of Carl Nicks on waivers.
- John Duren signed a multi-year contract with the Indiana Pacers.
- Armond Hill signed a contract with the Milwaukee Bucks.
- Bill Willoughby signed a contract with the San Antonio Spurs.
- Perry Moss, previously with the Boston Celtics, became a free agent.

Oct 17, 1982

- Bob Elliott, previously with the Detroit Pistons, became a free agent.

Oct 16, 1982

- Mike Dunleavy Sr. signed a contract with the San Antonio Spurs.
- Panayoti Giannakis, previously with the Boston Celtics, became a free agent.
- Tony Guy, previously with the Boston Celtics, became a free agent.

Oct 15, 1982

- The Detroit Pistons placed the contract of Bob Elliott on waivers.
- Robert Smith was acquired by the San Diego Clippers from the Milwaukee Bucks in a trade.
- Brook Steppe signed a multi-year contract with the Kansas City Kings.
- Bill Willoughby signed a multi-year offer sheet with the San Antonio Spurs. Since he is a restricted free agent, the Houston Rockets can match.

Oct 14, 1982

- The Boston Celtics placed the contract of Panayoti Giannakis on waivers.
- The Boston Celtics placed the contract of Tony Guy on waivers.
- The Boston Celtics placed the contract of Perry Moss on waivers.
- Johnny Moore signed a multi-year contract with the San Antonio Spurs.

Oct 13, 1982

- Bernard King signed a multi-year contract with the Golden State Warriors.
- The Golden State Warriors matched the offer sheet that Bernard King signed with the New York Knicks.
- Kevin Boyle, previously with the Philadelphia 76ers, became a free agent.
- John Duren, previously with the Utah Jazz, became a free agent.
- Howard Wood, previously with the Utah Jazz, became a free agent.

Oct 12, 1982

- Bobby Jones signed a veteran extension with the Philadelphia 76ers.
- Walter Daniels, previously with the San Antonio Spurs, became a free agent.
- Cedrick Hordges, previously with the Denver Nuggets, became a free agent.

Oct 11, 1982

- The Philadelphia 76ers placed the contract of Kevin Boyle on waivers.
- The Utah Jazz placed the contract of John Duren on waivers.
- The Utah Jazz placed the contract of Howard Wood on waivers.
- Mike Evans signed a contract with the San Diego Clippers.
- Bobby Cattage, previously with the Utah Jazz, became a free agent.
- Clarence Kea, previously with the Dallas Mavericks, became a free agent.
- Kevin McKenna, previously with the Los Angeles Lakers, became a free agent.

Oct 10, 1982

- The San Antonio Spurs placed the contract of Walter Daniels on waivers.
- The Denver Nuggets placed the contract of Cedrick Hordges on waivers.
- Dan Callandrillo, previously with the Houston Rockets, became a free agent.
- Keith Herron, previously with the Cleveland Cavaliers, became a free agent.

Oct 9, 1982

- The Dallas Mavericks placed the contract of Clarence Kea on waivers.
- Lynden Rose, previously with the Los Angeles Lakers, became a free agent.
- Charles Thompson, previously with the Portland Trail Blazers, became a free agent.
- Maurice Williams, previously with the Los Angeles Lakers, became a free agent.
- Francois Wise, previously with the Portland Trail Blazers, became a free agent.

Oct 8, 1982

- The Houston Rockets placed the contract of Dan Callandrillo on waivers.
- The Cleveland Cavaliers placed the contract of Keith Herron on waivers.
- Ray Blume was acquired by the San Diego Clippers from the Chicago Bulls in a trade.
- Ricky Pierce signed a multi-year contract with the Detroit Pistons.
- Terry Teagle signed a multi-year contract with the Houston Rockets.
- Alex Bradley, previously with the New York Knicks, became a free agent.
- Ron Davis, previously with the Utah Jazz, became a free agent.
- Sam Worthen, previously with the Utah Jazz, became a free agent.

Oct 7, 1982

- The Utah Jazz placed the contract of Bobby Cattage on waivers.
- The Los Angeles Lakers placed the contract of Kevin McKenna on waivers.
- The Los Angeles Lakers placed the contract of Lynden Rose on waivers.
- The Portland Trail Blazers placed the contract of Charles Thompson on waivers.
- The Los Angeles Lakers placed the contract of Maurice Williams on waivers.
- The Portland Trail Blazers placed the contract of Francois Wise on waivers.
- Steve Hayes was acquired by the Cleveland Cavaliers from the Detroit Pistons in a trade.
- Clark Kellogg signed a multi-year contract with the Indiana Pacers.
- Fat Lever signed a multi-year contract with the Portland Trail Blazers.
- Cliff Robinson signed a multi-year contract with the Cleveland Cavaliers.
- Jim Chones, previously with the Washington Bullets, became a free agent.

Oct 6, 1982

- The New York Knicks placed the contract of Alex Bradley on waivers.
- The Utah Jazz placed the contract of Ron Davis on waivers.
- The Utah Jazz placed the contract of Sam Worthen on waivers.
- The Cleveland Cavaliers matched the offer sheet that Cliff Robinson signed with the Houston Rockets.
- Mike Sanders, previously with the Kansas City Kings, became a free agent.

Oct 5, 1982

- The Washington Bullets placed the contract of Jim Chones on waivers.
- Wally Walker was acquired by the Houston Rockets from the Seattle SuperSonics in a trade.
- Paul Pressey signed a multi-year contract with the Milwaukee Bucks.
- Trent Tucker signed a multi-year contract with the New York Knicks.
- Cliff Robinson signed a multi-year offer sheet with the Houston Rockets. Since he is a restricted free agent, the Cleveland Cavaliers can match.

Oct 4, 1982

- The Kansas City Kings placed the contract of Mike Sanders on waivers.
- Wally Walker signed a multi-year contract with the Seattle SuperSonics.

Oct 3, 1982

- DeWayne Scales, previously with the New York Knicks, became a free agent.

Oct 2, 1982

- Dudley Bradley signed a contract with the Chicago Bulls.

Oct 1, 1982

- The New York Knicks placed the contract of DeWayne Scales on waivers.
- Dudley Bradley signed a multi-year offer sheet with the Chicago Bulls. Since he is a restricted free agent, the Phoenix Suns can match.
- Bernard King signed a multi-year offer sheet with the New York Knicks. Since he is a restricted free agent, the Golden State Warriors can match.
- The Washington Bullets renounced their draft rights to make Dwight Anderson an Unrestricted FA.

=== September 1982 ===
Sep 30, 1982

- Ed Sherod was acquired by the New York Knicks from the New Jersey Nets in a trade.
- Bill Garnett signed a multi-year contract with the Dallas Mavericks.
- Oliver Robinson signed a multi-year contract with the San Antonio Spurs.
- Darren Tillis signed a multi-year contract with the Boston Celtics.
- Steve Trumbo signed a contract with the Utah Jazz.
- Sonny Parker, previously with the Golden State Warriors, became a free agent.

Sep 29, 1982

- Geff Crompton, previously with the Milwaukee Bucks, became a free agent.

Sep 28, 1982

- The Golden State Warriors placed the contract of Sonny Parker on waivers.
- Rickey Williams signed a multi-year contract with the Utah Jazz.

Sep 27, 1982

- The Milwaukee Bucks placed the contract of Geff Crompton on waivers.
- George T. Johnson was acquired by the Atlanta Hawks from the San Antonio Spurs in a trade.
- Jim Johnstone was acquired by the San Antonio Spurs from the Atlanta Hawks in a trade.
- Charlie Criss signed a multi-year contract with the Milwaukee Bucks.

Sep 24, 1982

- Rod Higgins signed a multi-year contract with the Chicago Bulls.

Sep 22, 1982

- Billy Ray Bates, previously with the Washington Bullets, became a free agent.

Sep 20, 1982

- The Portland Trail Blazers placed the contract of Billy Ray Bates on waivers.
- Billy Ray Bates signed a contract with the Washington Bullets.
- Joe Cooper signed a contract with the Los Angeles Lakers.

Sep 19, 1982

- Kenny Higgs, previously with the Denver Nuggets, became a free agent.

Sep 18, 1982

- Steve Mix signed a multi-year contract with the Milwaukee Bucks.

Sep 17, 1982

- The Denver Nuggets placed the contract of Kenny Higgs on waivers.

Sep 15, 1982

- Caldwell Jones was acquired by the Houston Rockets from the Philadelphia 76ers in a trade.
- Moses Malone was acquired by the Philadelphia 76ers from the Houston Rockets in a trade.

Sep 14, 1982

- Moses Malone signed a multi-year contract with the Houston Rockets.

Sep 13, 1982

- The Houston Rockets matched the offer sheet that Moses Malone signed with the Philadelphia 76ers.

Sep 10, 1982

- Ernie Grunfeld signed a multi-year contract with the New York Knicks.
- Edgar Jones signed a contract with the Detroit Pistons.
- Jeff Jones signed a contract with the Golden State Warriors.
- U.S. Reed signed a multi-year contract with the San Antonio Spurs.
- Dominique Wilkins signed a multi-year contract with the Atlanta Hawks.

Sep 9, 1982

- Quinn Buckner was acquired by the Boston Celtics from the Milwaukee Bucks in a trade.
- Dave Cowens signed a multi-year contract with the Milwaukee Bucks.
- Charles Pittman signed a multi-year contract with the Phoenix Suns.

Sep 7, 1982

- Dave Cowens signed a multi-year offer sheet with the Milwaukee Bucks. Since he is a restricted free agent, the Boston Celtics can match.

Sep 2, 1982

- John Drew was acquired by the Utah Jazz from the Atlanta Hawks in a trade.
- Tom Owens was acquired by the Detroit Pistons from the Indiana Pacers in a trade.
- Freeman Williams was acquired by the Utah Jazz from the Atlanta Hawks in a trade.
- The Atlanta Hawks acquired the draft rights to Dominique Wilkins from the Utah Jazz in a trade.

Sep 1, 1982

- J.J. Anderson signed a multi-year contract with the Philadelphia 76ers.
- Richard Anderson signed a multi-year contract with the San Diego Clippers.
- Dave Batton signed a multi-year contract with the Washington Bullets.
- Ron Baxter signed a multi-year contract with the Golden State Warriors.
- Kevin Boyle signed a contract with the Philadelphia 76ers.
- Tony Brown signed a contract with the New Jersey Nets.
- Dan Callandrillo signed a contract with the Houston Rockets.
- Jeff Cook signed a multi-year contract with the Phoenix Suns.
- Mike Davis signed a multi-year contract with the New York Knicks.
- Ron Davis signed a contract with the Utah Jazz.
- T.R. Dunn signed a multi-year contract with the Denver Nuggets.
- Jerry Eaves signed a multi-year contract with the Utah Jazz.
- Bob Elliott signed a contract with the Detroit Pistons.
- Chris Engler signed a multi-year contract with the Golden State Warriors.
- Bruce Flowers signed a contract with the Cleveland Cavaliers.
- Ricky Frazier signed a multi-year contract with the Chicago Bulls.
- Panayoti Giannakis signed a contract with the Boston Celtics.
- John Greig signed a contract with the Seattle SuperSonics.
- Tony Guy signed a multi-year contract with the Boston Celtics.
- Scott Hastings signed a multi-year contract with the New York Knicks.
- Eddie Hughes signed a contract with the San Diego Clippers.
- Jim Johnstone signed a multi-year contract with the Atlanta Hawks.
- Hutch Jones signed a contract with the Los Angeles Lakers.
- Joe Kopicki signed a multi-year contract with the Atlanta Hawks.
- Bob Lanier signed a multi-year contract with the Milwaukee Bucks.
- Cliff Levingston signed a multi-year contract with the Detroit Pistons.
- Dave Magley signed a multi-year contract with the Cleveland Cavaliers.
- Guy Morgan signed a multi-year contract with the Indiana Pacers.
- Nick Morken signed a contract with the Golden State Warriors.
- Perry Moss signed a contract with the Boston Celtics.
- Chuck Nevitt signed a multi-year contract with the Houston Rockets.
- Audie Norris signed a multi-year contract with the Portland Trail Blazers.
- Willie Redden signed a contract with the San Antonio Spurs.
- Clint Richardson signed a multi-year contract with the Philadelphia 76ers.
- Lynden Rose signed a contract with the Los Angeles Lakers.
- Walker Russell Sr. signed a multi-year contract with the Detroit Pistons.
- Mike Sanders signed a contract with the Kansas City Kings.
- Russ Schoene signed a contract with the Philadelphia 76ers.
- John Schweitz signed a contract with the Boston Celtics.
- Jose Slaughter signed a multi-year contract with the Indiana Pacers.
- Jeff Taylor signed a multi-year contract with the Houston Rockets.
- Vince Taylor signed a multi-year contract with the New York Knicks.
- Charles Thompson signed a multi-year contract with the Portland Trail Blazers.
- Corny Thompson signed a multi-year contract with the Dallas Mavericks.
- Linton Townes signed a multi-year contract with the Portland Trail Blazers.
- Bryan Warrick signed a multi-year contract with the Washington Bullets.
- Rory White signed a multi-year contract with the Phoenix Suns.
- Terry White signed a contract with the Cleveland Cavaliers.
- Maurice Williams signed a contract with the Los Angeles Lakers.
- Mike Wilson signed a contract with the Cleveland Cavaliers.
- Francois Wise signed a contract with the Portland Trail Blazers.
- Sam Worthen signed a contract with the Utah Jazz.
- Jim Zoet signed a contract with the Atlanta Hawks.
- Moses Malone signed a multi-year offer sheet with the Philadelphia 76ers. Since he is a restricted free agent, the Houston Rockets can match.
- The Washington Bullets renounced their free-agent exception rights to Ronnie Valentine.

=== August 1982 ===
Aug 31, 1982

- The Dallas Mavericks renounced their free-agent exception rights to Tom LaGarde.

Aug 27, 1982

- Darryl Dawkins was acquired by the New Jersey Nets from the Philadelphia 76ers in a trade.

Aug 26, 1982

- Mark Eaton signed a multi-year contract with the Utah Jazz.

Aug 16, 1982

- Marty Byrnes signed a multi-year contract with the Indiana Pacers.

Aug 8, 1982

- John Lambert, previously with the San Antonio Spurs, became a free agent.

Aug 2, 1982

- Jeff Judkins signed a multi-year contract with the Portland Trail Blazers.

Aug 1, 1982

- The San Antonio Spurs placed the contract of John Lambert on waivers.
- John Bagley signed a multi-year contract with the Cleveland Cavaliers.
- Quintin Dailey signed a multi-year contract with the Chicago Bulls.
- Sleepy Floyd signed a multi-year contract with the New Jersey Nets.
- Craig Hodges signed a multi-year contract with the San Diego Clippers.
- Marc Iavaroni signed a multi-year contract with the Philadelphia 76ers.
- Bill Laimbeer signed a multi-year contract with the Detroit Pistons.
- Eddie Phillips signed a multi-year contract with the New Jersey Nets.
- Derek Smith signed a multi-year contract with the Golden State Warriors.
- Rory Sparrow signed a multi-year contract with the Atlanta Hawks.
- Reggie Theus signed a multi-year contract with the Chicago Bulls.
- David Thirdkill signed a multi-year contract with the Phoenix Suns.
- Rob Williams signed a multi-year contract with the Denver Nuggets.
- James Worthy signed a multi-year contract with the Los Angeles Lakers.
- Jeff Judkins signed a multi-year offer sheet with the Portland Trail Blazers. Since he is a restricted free agent, the Detroit Pistons can match.

=== July 1982 ===
Jul 30, 1982

- Walter Daniels signed a contract with the San Antonio Spurs.
- Rich Yonakor signed a contract with the San Antonio Spurs.

Jul 27, 1982

- Steve Lingenfelter signed a multi-year contract with the Washington Bullets.
- DeWayne Scales signed a contract with the New York Knicks.

Jul 25, 1982

- Mark McNamara signed a multi-year contract with the Philadelphia 76ers.

Jul 22, 1982

- Dave Corzine was acquired by the Chicago Bulls from the San Antonio Spurs in a trade.
- Artis Gilmore was acquired by the San Antonio Spurs from the Chicago Bulls in a trade.
- Mark Olberding was acquired by the Chicago Bulls from the San Antonio Spurs in a trade.

Jul 20, 1982

- Bill Hanzlik was acquired by the Denver Nuggets from the Seattle SuperSonics in a trade.
- Ed Nealy signed a multi-year contract with the Kansas City Kings.

Jul 15, 1982

- Dave Corzine signed a multi-year contract with the San Antonio Spurs.

Jul 12, 1982

- Dave Corzine signed a multi-year offer sheet with the New Jersey Nets. Since he is a restricted free agent, the San Antonio Spurs can match.
- The San Antonio Spurs matched the offer sheet that Dave Corzine signed with the New Jersey Nets.

Jul 7, 1982

- Maurice Lucas was acquired by the Phoenix Suns from the New York Knicks in a trade.
- Truck Robinson was acquired by the New York Knicks from the Phoenix Suns in a trade.
- Johnny High signed a multi-year contract with the Phoenix Suns.

Jul 1, 1982

- The Utah Jazz renounced their free-agent exception rights to Bill Robinzine.
- Carl Bailey, previously with the Portland Trail Blazers, became a free agent.
- Mike Bantom, previously with the Philadelphia 76ers, became a free agent.
- Dudley Bradley, previously with the Phoenix Suns, became a free agent.
- Mike Bratz, previously with the San Antonio Spurs, became a free agent.
- Jim Brewer, previously with the Los Angeles Lakers, became a free agent.
- Don Buse, previously with the Indiana Pacers, became a free agent.
- Jeff Cook, previously with the Phoenix Suns, became a free agent.
- Hollis Copeland, previously with the New York Knicks, became a free agent.
- Dave Corzine, previously with the San Antonio Spurs, became a free agent.
- Dave Cowens, previously with the Boston Celtics, became a free agent.
- Charlie Criss, previously with the San Diego Clippers, became a free agent.
- Johnny Davis, previously with the Indiana Pacers, became a free agent.
- Larry Demic, previously with the New York Knicks, became a free agent.
- Coby Dietrick, previously with the Chicago Bulls, became a free agent.
- Mike Dunleavy Sr., previously with the Houston Rockets, became a free agent.
- T.R. Dunn, previously with the Denver Nuggets, became a free agent.
- Mike Evans, previously with the Cleveland Cavaliers, became a free agent.
- Bob Gross, previously with the Portland Trail Blazers, became a free agent.
- Ernie Grunfeld, previously with the Kansas City Kings, became a free agent.
- James Hardy, previously with the Utah Jazz, became a free agent.
- Armond Hill, previously with the San Diego Clippers, became a free agent.
- Brad Holland, previously with the Milwaukee Bucks, became a free agent.
- Ollie Johnson, previously with the Philadelphia 76ers, became a free agent.
- Edgar Jones, previously with the Detroit Pistons, became a free agent.
- Jeff Judkins, previously with the Detroit Pistons, became a free agent.
- Bernard King, previously with the Golden State Warriors, became a free agent.
- Kevin Kunnert, previously with the Portland Trail Blazers, became a free agent.
- Tom LaGarde, previously with the Dallas Mavericks, became a free agent.
- Sam Lacey, previously with the New Jersey Nets, became a free agent.
- Bill Laimbeer, previously with the Detroit Pistons, became a free agent.
- Mark Landsberger, previously with the Los Angeles Lakers, became a free agent.
- Bob Lanier, previously with the Milwaukee Bucks, became a free agent.
- Rock Lee, previously with the San Diego Clippers, became a free agent.
- Ron Lee, previously with the Detroit Pistons, became a free agent.
- Moses Malone, previously with the Houston Rockets, became a free agent.
- Bob McAdoo, previously with the Los Angeles Lakers, became a free agent.
- Jim McElroy, previously with the Atlanta Hawks, became a free agent.
- Joe C. Meriweather, previously with the Kansas City Kings, became a free agent.
- Steve Mix, previously with the Philadelphia 76ers, became a free agent.
- Johnny Moore, previously with the San Antonio Spurs, became a free agent.
- Louis Orr, previously with the Indiana Pacers, became a free agent.
- Sam Pellom, previously with the Atlanta Hawks, became a free agent.
- Kevin Restani, previously with the Cleveland Cavaliers, became a free agent.
- Clint Richardson, previously with the Philadelphia 76ers, became a free agent.
- Cliff Robinson, previously with the Cleveland Cavaliers, became a free agent.
- Bill Robinzine, previously with the Utah Jazz, became a free agent.
- John Roche, previously with the Denver Nuggets, became a free agent.
- James Silas, previously with the Cleveland Cavaliers, became a free agent.
- Randy Smith, previously with the New York Knicks, became a free agent.
- Ricky Sobers, previously with the Chicago Bulls, became a free agent.
- Rory Sparrow, previously with the Atlanta Hawks, became a free agent.
- Brian Taylor, previously with the San Diego Clippers, became a free agent.
- Reggie Theus, previously with the Chicago Bulls, became a free agent.
- Ronnie Valentine, previously with the Washington Bullets, became a free agent.
- Jan van Breda Kolff, previously with the New Jersey Nets, became a free agent.
- Wally Walker, previously with the Seattle SuperSonics, became a free agent.
- Kermit Washington, previously with the Portland Trail Blazers, became a free agent.
- Paul Westphal, previously with the New York Knicks, became a free agent.
- Bill Willoughby, previously with the Houston Rockets, became a free agent.
- Larry Wright, previously with the Detroit Pistons, became a free agent.
- Rich Yonakor, previously with the San Antonio Spurs, became a free agent.
