= Brooklyn Nets draft history =

This is a list of the Brooklyn Nets' National Basketball Association (NBA) Draft selections.

== Key ==
Naismith Basketball Hall of Famer	First overall NBA draft pick	Selected for an NBA All-Star Game

== Selections ==
Year	Round	Pick	Player	Nationality	Position	College/High School/Club
2023	1	21	Noah Clowney	United States	PF	Alabama
2023	1	22	Dariq Whitehead	United States	SF	Duke
2023	2	51	Jalen Wilson	United States	SF	Kansas
2021	1	27	Cameron Thomas	United States	SG	Louisiana State University
2021	2	44	Kessler Edwards	United States	SF	Pepperdine University
2021	2	49	Marcus Zegarowski	United States	PG	Creighton University
2021	2	59	RaiQuan Gray	United States	PF	Florida State University
2020	1	19	Saddiq Bey	United States	SF	Villanova University
2020	2	55	Jay Scrubb	United States	SG	John A. Logan College
2019	1	17	Nickeil Alexander-Walker	Canada	SG	Virginia Tech
2019	1	29	Mfiondu Kabengele	Canada	PF	Florida State University
2019	2	31	Nic Claxton	United States Virgin Islands	PF	University of Georgia
2018	1	29	Džanan Musa	Bosnia and Herzegovina	SF	Cedevita (Croatia)
2018	2	40	Rodions Kurucs	Latvia	SF	FC Barcelona (Spain)
2018	2	45	Hamidou Diallo	United States	SG	University of Kentucky
2017	1	22	Jarrett Allen	United States	C	University of Texas
2017	1	27	Kyle Kuzma	United States	PF	University of Utah
2017	2	57	Sasha Vezenkov	Bulgaria	PF	FC Barcelona (Spain)
2016	2	55	Marcus Paige	United States	PG	University of North Carolina
2015	1	29	Chris McCullough	United States	PF	Syracuse University
2015	2	41	Pat Connaughton	United States	SF	University of Notre Dame
2013	1	22	Mason Plumlee	United States	PF/C	Duke University
2012	2	57	İlkan Karaman	Turkey	PF	Karşıyaka (Turkey)
2011	1	27	JaJuan Johnson	United States	PF	Purdue University
2011	2	36	Jordan Williams	United States	PF/C	University of Maryland
2010	1	3	Derrick Favors	United States	PF/C	Georgia Institute of Technology
2010	1	27	Jordan Crawford	United States	SG/PG	Xavier University
2010	2	31	Tibor Pleiß	Germany	C	Brose Baskets
2009	1	11	Terrence Williams	United States	SF/SG	University of Louisville
2008	1	10	Brook Lopez	United States	C	Stanford University
2008	1	21	Ryan Anderson	United States	PF/SF	University of California
2008	2	40	Chris Douglas-Roberts	United States	SG/SF	University of Memphis
2007	1	17	Sean Williams	United States	PF/C	Boston College
2006	1	22	Marcus Williams	United States	PG/SG	University of Connecticut
2006	1	23	Josh Boone	United States	C/PF	University of Connecticut
2006	2	24	Hassan Adams	United States	SG/SF	University of Arizona
2005	1	15	Antoine Wright	United States	SG/SF	Texas A&M University
2005	2	13	Mile Ilić	Serbia	C	FMP Zeleznik
2004	1	22	Viktor Khryapa	Russia	PF/SF	PBC CSKA Moscow
2004	2	22	Christian Drejer	Denmark	SF	University of Florida
2003	1	22	Zoran Planinić	Croatia	PG/SG/SF	Cibona Zagreb
2003	2	22	Kyle Korver	United States	SG/SF	Creighton University
2002	1	24	Nenad Krstić	Serbia	C	KK Partizan
2002	2	25	Tamar Slay	United States	SG/SF/PF	Marshall University
2001	1	7	Eddie Griffin	United States	PF/C	Seton Hall University
2001	2	34	Brian Scalabrine	United States	PF/SF	University of Southern California
2000	1	1	Kenyon Martin	United States	PF	University of Cincinnati
2000	2	36	Soumaila Samake	Mali	C	Cincinnati Stuff (IBL)
1999	2	34	Evan Eschmeyer	United States	C	Northwestern University
1997	1	7	Tim Thomas	United States	PF	Villanova University
1997	1	21	Anthony Parker	United States	SG	Bradley University
1996	1	8	Kerry Kittles	United States	SG	Villanova University
1995	1	9	Ed O'Bannon	United States	PF	University of California, Los Angeles
1994	1	14	Yinka Dare	Nigeria	C	George Washington University
1993	1	16	Rex Walters			University of Kansas
1993	2	36	John Best			Tennessee Technological University
1992	2	29	P. J. Brown			Louisiana Tech University
1992	2	40	Steve Rogers			Alabama State University
1991	1	2	Kenny Anderson			Georgia Institute of Technology
1991	2	53	Von McDade			University of Wisconsin–Milwaukee
1990	1	1	Derrick Coleman			Syracuse University
1990	1	22	Tate George			University of Connecticut
1989	1	12	Mookie Blaylock			University of Oklahoma
1989	2	32	Stanley Brundy			DePaul University
1988	1	4	Chris Morris			Auburn University
1988	2	32	Charles Shackleford			North Carolina State University
1988	3	52	Derrick Hamilton			University of Southern Mississippi
1987	1	3	Dennis Hopson			Ohio State University
1987	3	48	Jamie Waller			Virginia Union University
1987	4	72	Andrew Moten			University of Florida
1987	5	94	James Blackmon			University of Kentucky
1987	6	118	Perry Bromwell			University of Pennsylvania
1987	7	140	Frank Booker			Bowling Green State University
1986	1	13	Dwayne Washington			Syracuse University
1986	4	81	Steve Hale			University of North Carolina
1986	5	105	Archie Johnson			University of Alabama at Birmingham
1986	6	127	Troy Webster			George Washington University
1986	7	151	Jim Dolan			University of Notre Dame
1985	2	36	Yvon Joseph	Haiti	C	Georgia Institute of Technology
1985	2	38	Fernando Martín Espina			Real Madrid Baloncesto (Spain)
1985	3	62	Nigel Miguel			University of California, Los Angeles
1985	5	108	Kelly Blaine			University of South Alabama
1985	6	130	George Almones			University of Louisiana at Lafayette
1985	7	154	Gary McLain			Villanova University
1984	1	17	Jeff Turner			Vanderbilt University
1984	3	63	Yommy Sangodeyi			Sam Houston State University
1984	4	85	Hank Cornley			Illinois State University
1984	5	109	Michael Gerren			University of South Alabama
1984	6	131	Oscar Schmidt			JuveCaserta Basket (Italy)
1984	7	155	Sean Kerins			Syracuse University
1984	8	177	Chris Winans			University of Utah
1984	9	200	Billy Ryan			Princeton University
1984	10	221	Phil Jamison			Saint Peter's College (New Jersey)
1983	2	44	Horace Owens			University of Rhode Island
1983	3	59	Bruce Kuczenski			University of Connecticut
1983	4	87	Barney Mines			Bradley University
1983	5	110	Tyren Naulls			Texas A&M University
1983	6	133	Oscar Taylor			University of New Orleans
1983	7	156	Keith Bennett			Sacred Heart University
1983	8	179	Joe Myers			Duquesne University
1983	9	201	Kevin Black			Rutgers University
1983	10	222	Rich Simkus			Princeton University
1982	1	13	Sleepy Floyd			Georgetown University
1982	1	21	Eddie Phillips			University of Alabama
1982	3	59	Jimmy Black			University of North Carolina
1982	4	80	James Griffin			University of Illinois at Urbana-Champaign
1982	4	82	Tony Brown			University of Arkansas
1982	5	105	Chris Giles			University of Alabama at Birmingham
1982	6	128	Mel Daniel			Furman University
1982	7	151	Tony Anderson			University of California, Los Angeles
1982	8	174	Otis Jackson			University of Memphis
1982	9	197	Gary Johnson			Oral Roberts University
1982	10	218	Sean Tuohy			University of Mississippi
1981	1	3	Buck Williams			University of Maryland, College Park
1981	1	10	Albert King			University of Maryland, College Park
1981	1	18	Ray Tolbert			Indiana University
1981	3	49	David Burns			Saint Louis University
1981	4	72	Ed Sherod			Virginia Commonwealth University
1981	5	95	Joe Cooper			University of Colorado
1981	6	118	Kevin Lynam			La Salle University
1981	7	141	Rod Robertson			Northwestern University
1981	8	164	Ken Webb			Fairleigh Dickinson University
1981	9	186	Rudy Williams			Providence College
1981	10	206	Vic Sison			University of California, Los Angeles
1980	1	6	Mike O'Koren			University of North Carolina
1980	1	7	Mike Gminski			Duke University
1980	3	52	Lowes Moore			West Virginia University
1980	4	75	Rory Sparrow			Villanova University
1980	5	98	Aaron Curry			University of Oklahoma
1980	6	121	Rick Mattick			Louisiana State University
1980	7	144	Larry Spicer			University of Alabama at Birmingham
1980	8	165	Lloyd Terry			University of New Orleans
1980	9	185	Barry Young			Colorado State University
1979	1	8	Calvin Natt			University of Louisiana at Monroe
1979	1	11	Clifford T. Robinson			University of Southern California
1979	3	51	John Gerdy			Davidson College
1979	5	95	Joe Abramaitis			University of Connecticut
1979	6	115	Tony Smith			University of Nevada, Las Vegas
1979	7	135	Jim Strickland			University of South Carolina
1979	8	154	Henry Hollingsworth			Hofstra University
1979	9	173	Ricky Free			Columbia University
1979	10	191	Eric Fleisher			Tulane University
1978	1	13	Winford Boynes			University of San Francisco
1978	3	45	Mike Phillips			University of Kentucky
1978	3	62	Dave Batton			University of Notre Dame
1978	4	84	Walter Jordan			Purdue University
1978	5	89	Cecile Rose			University of Houston
1978	6	111	Golie Augustus			University of South Carolina
1978	7	132	Doug Jemison			University of San Francisco
1978	8	153	Bruce Campbell			Providence College
1978	9	171	Frank Sowinski			Princeton University
1978	10	187	Michael Vicens			College of the Holy Cross
1977	1	7	Bernard King	United States		University of Tennessee
1977	4	67	Bob Elmore			Wichita State University
1977	5	89	Gerald Cunningham			Kentucky State University
1977	6	111	Mark Crow	United States		Duke University
1977	7	132	Scott Conant			Newberry College
1977	8	152	Ralph Drollinger	United States		University of California, Los Angeles
