= 1981–82 Utah Jazz season =

NBA professional basketball team season

- Head coach: Tom Nissalke (fired); Frank Layden
- General manager: Frank Layden
- Owners: Sam Battistone; Larry Hatfield
- Arena: Salt Palace

Results
- Record: 25–57 (.305)
- Place: Division: 6th (Midwest); Conference: 11th (Western)
- Playoff finish: Did not qualify
- Stats at Basketball Reference

Local media
- Television: KSL-TV
- Radio: KSL

The 1981–82 Utah Jazz season was the team's eighth in the NBA. They began the season hoping to improve upon their 28–54 output from the previous season. They came up three wins shy of tying it, finishing 25–57, and failed to qualify for the playoffs for the eighth straight season. Prior to the season, the Jazz modified their uniform, changing their road jersey from purple to green, which they would keep until 1984.

== Draft picks ==
Round	Pick	Player	Position	Nationality	College
1	13	Danny Schayes	C	United States	Syracuse
2	27	Howard Wood	PF	United States	Tennessee
4	73	George Torres		Puerto Rico	Southern Nazarene
5	97	Mike Clark		United States	Oregon
6	119	Kevin Sprewer		United States	Loyola (IL)
7	143	Mike Robinson		United States	Central Michigan
8	165	Bobby Cattage	PF	United States	Auburn
9	188	Ken Ollie		United States	Wyoming
10	207	Joe Merten		United States	Wisconsin Eau-Claire

== Roster ==
1981–82 Utah Jazz roster
Players

Pos.	No.	Player	Height	Weight	DOB	From
PF	43	Bobby Cattage	6 ft 9 in (2.06 m)	250 lb (113 kg)	1958–08–17	Auburn
SF	4	Adrian Dantley	6 ft 5 in (1.96 m)	208 lb (94 kg)	1955–02–28	Notre Dame
PG	18	John Duren	6 ft 3 in (1.91 m)	195 lb (88 kg)	1958–10–30	Georgetown
PG	14	Rickey Green	6 ft 0 in (1.83 m)	170 lb (77 kg)	1954–08–18	Michigan
SG	35	Darrell Griffith	6 ft 4 in (1.93 m)	190 lb (86 kg)	1958–06–16	Louisville
PF	11	James Hardy	6 ft 8 in (2.03 m)	220 lb (100 kg)	1956–12–01	San Francisco
G	22	Carl Nicks	6 ft 1 in (1.85 m)	175 lb (79 kg)	1958–10–06	Indiana State
C	50	Ben Poquette	6 ft 9 in (2.06 m)	235 lb (107 kg)	1955–05–07	Central Michigan
PF	52	Bill Robinzine	6 ft 7 in (2.01 m)	230 lb (104 kg)	1953–01–20	DePaul
C	24	Danny Schayes	6 ft 11 in (2.11 m)	235 lb (107 kg)	1959–05–10	Syracuse
C	45	Jeff Wilkins	6 ft 11 in (2.11 m)	230 lb (104 kg)	1955–03–09	Illinois State
F	33	Howard Wood	6 ft 7 in (2.01 m)	235 lb (107 kg)	1959–05–20	Tennessee

Coaches
Head coach
- Frank Layden
Assistant(s)
- Bill Bertka
- Gene Littles

Legend
- (DP) Unsigned draft pick
- (FA) Free agent
- (S) Suspended
- Injured

== Regular season ==
=== Season standings ===
Midwest Division	W	L	PCT	GB	Home	Road	Div
y-San Antonio Spurs	48	34	.585	–	29–12	19–22	20–10
x-Denver Nuggets	46	36	.561	2.0	29–12	17–24	19–11
x-Houston Rockets	46	36	.561	2.0	25–16	21–20	17–13
Kansas City Kings	30	52	.366	18.0	23–18	7–34	11–19
Dallas Mavericks	28	54	.341	20.0	16–25	12–29	11–19
Utah Jazz	25	57	.305	23.0	18–23	7–34	9–21

#	Western Conference				
#	Team	W	L	PCT	GB
1	c-Los Angeles Lakers	57	25	.695	–
2	y-San Antonio Spurs	48	34	.585	9
3	x-Seattle SuperSonics	52	30	.634	5
4	x-Denver Nuggets	46	36	.561	11
5	x-Phoenix Suns	46	36	.561	11
6	x-Houston Rockets	46	36	.561	11
7	Golden State Warriors	45	37	.549	12
8	Portland Trail Blazers	42	40	.512	15
9	Kansas City Kings	30	52	.366	27
10	Dallas Mavericks	28	54	.341	29
11	Utah Jazz	25	57	.305	32
12	San Diego Clippers	17	65	.207	40

z - clinched division title
y - clinched division title
x - clinched playoff spot

=== Game log ===
1981–82 game log
Total: 25–57 (home: 18–23; road: 7–34)
October: 0–0 (home: 0–0; road: 0–0)

Game	Date	Team	Score	High points	High rebounds	High assists	Location Attendance	Record

November: 0–0 (home: 0–0; road: 0–0)

Game	Date	Team	Score	High points	High rebounds	High assists	Location Attendance	Record

December: 0–0 (home: 0–0; road: 0–0)

Game	Date	Team	Score	High points	High rebounds	High assists	Location Attendance	Record

January: 0–0 (home: 0–0; road: 0–0)

Game	Date	Team	Score	High points	High rebounds	High assists	Location Attendance	Record

February: 0–0 (home: 0–0; road: 0–0)

Game	Date	Team	Score	High points	High rebounds	High assists	Location Attendance	Record

March: 0–0 (home: 0–0; road: 0–0)

Game	Date	Team	Score	High points	High rebounds	High assists	Location Attendance	Record

1981–82 schedule

== Player statistics ==
Legend
GP	Games played	GS	Games started	MPG	Minutes per game
FG%	Field-goal percentage	3P%	3-point field-goal percentage	FT%	Free-throw percentage
RPG	Rebounds per game	APG	Assists per game	SPG	Steals per game
BPG	Blocks per game	PPG	Points per game

Player	GP	GS	MPG	FG%	3FG%	FT%	RPG	APG	SPG	BPG	PPG
Bobby Cattage											
Adrian Dantley											
John Duren											
Rickey Green											
Darrell Griffith											
James Hardy											
Carl Nicks											
Ben Poquette											
Bill Robinzine											
Danny Schayes											
Jeff Wilkins											
Howard Wood											
Sam Worthen											

== Transactions ==
=== Trades ===
August 20, 1981
To Utah Jazz----
- Bill Robinzine
To Dallas Mavericks----
- Allan Bristow
- Wayne Cooper
