= Carl Bailey =

American basketball player (born 1958)

Personal information
- Born: April 23, 1958 (age 68) Birmingham, Alabama
- Listed height: 7 ft 0 in (2.13 m)
- Listed weight: 210 lb (95 kg)

Career information
- High school: P.D. Jackson-Olin (Birmingham, Alabama)
- College: Tuskegee (1976–1980)
- NBA draft: 1980: 3rd round, 66th overall pick
- Drafted by: Seattle SuperSonics
- Playing career: 1980–1983
- Position: Center
- Number: 21

Career history
- 1980–1982: Alberta Dusters
- 1982: Portland Trail Blazers
- 1982: Las Vegas Silvers
- 1982: Wisconsin Flyers
- 1982–1983: Billings Volcanos

Career highlights
- All-CBA Second Team (1981)
- Stats at NBA.com
- Stats at Basketball Reference

Carl Bailey (born April 23, 1958) is an American former basketball. Born in Birmingham, Alabama, he attended Tuskegee University in Tuskegee, Alabama. During his sophomore season, he averaged 18.2 points and 13.3 rebounds per game and led NCAA Division II in field goal percent.

He was selected by the Seattle SuperSonics in the 3rd round (66th overall pick) of the 1980 NBA draft but was waived before the start of the season. He spent the 1980–1981 season with the Alberta Dusters and was selected to the All-CBA Second Team before signing again with the Sonics in June 1981. He appeared in four preseason games for the Sonics but was waived again before the start of the regular season.

In March 1982, Bailey signed with the Portland Trail Blazers. He appeared in one game for the Blazers with them, scoring two points in seven minutes of action.

== Career statistics ==
Legend
GP	Games played	GS	Games started	MPG	Minutes per game
FG%	Field goal percentage	3P%	3-point field goal percentage	FT%	Free throw percentage
RPG	Rebounds per game	APG	Assists per game	SPG	Steals per game
BPG	Blocks per game	PPG	Points per game	**Bold**	Career high

=== NBA ===
==== Regular season ====
Year	Team	GP	GS	MPG	FG%	3P%	FT%	RPG	APG	SPG	BPG	PPG
1981–82	Portland	1	0	7.0	1.000	–	–	.0	.0	.0	.0	2.0
