= Howard Wood (basketball) =

American basketball player

Personal information
- Born: May 20, 1959 (age 67) Southampton, New York, U.S.
- Listed height: 6 ft 7 in (2.01 m)
- Listed weight: 235 lb (107 kg)

Career information
- High school: East Hampton (East Hampton, New York)
- College: Tennessee (1977–1981)
- NBA draft: 1981: 2nd round, 27th overall pick
- Drafted by: Utah Jazz
- Playing career: 1981–1996
- Position: Power forward
- Number: 33

Career history
- 1981–1982: Utah Jazz
- 1982–1983: Billings Volcanos
- 1983–1984: Wisconsin Flyers
- 1984–1985: Cacaolat Granollers
- 1985–1986: Tizona Burgos
- 1986–1987: Valencia Hoja del Lunes
- 1987–1988: Caixa Ourense
- 1988–1989: Metro Santa Coloma
- 1989–1992: Pamesa Valencia
- 1992–1993: Ferrys Llíria
- 1993–1995: Coren Ourense
- 1995–1996: Cajacantabria
- Stats at NBA.com
- Stats at Basketball Reference

James Howard Wood (born May 20, 1959) is an American former professional basketball player born in Southampton, New York. A 6'7" 235 lb power forward, Wood played college basketball for the Tennessee Volunteers and played one season in the National Basketball Association (NBA) with the Utah Jazz.

Howard Wood, a graduate of East Hampton High School, led the team to a state H.S. basketball championship in 1977.

During his years at Tennessee, he teamed with future NBA players Reggie Johnson and Dale Ellis, and as a senior was a key player on the team's first ever NCAA Tournament Sweet Sixteen appearance in 1981, where they lost to top-seeded Virginia Cavaliers. Wood was named second team All-America in 1981 by Converse, and earned first team All-SEC honors as a senior in 1981. He was named the MVP of the 1980 Sugar Bowl Classic and the 1979 Volunteer Classic. He finished his career at Tennessee with 1,201 career points and 595 rebounds.

Wood was selected by the Utah Jazz with the 4th pick in the 2nd round of the 1981 NBA draft. He averaged 3.4 points per game in 42 games for them in 1981–82 — his only NBA season, after which he played several years in Spain's premier leagues.

== Career statistics ==
Legend
| GP | Games played | GS | Games started | MPG | Minutes per game |
| FG% | Field goal percentage | 3P% | 3-point field goal percentage | FT% | Free throw percentage |
| RPG | Rebounds per game | APG | Assists per game | SPG | Steals per game |
| BPG | Blocks per game | PPG | Points per game | **Bold** | Career high |

=== NBA ===
==== Regular season ====
| Year | Team | GP | GS | MPG | FG% | 3P% | FT% | RPG | APG | SPG | BPG | PPG |
|---|---|---|---|---|---|---|---|---|---|---|---|---|
| 1981–82 | Utah | 42 | 3 | 8.1 | .458 | .000 | .654 | 1.5 | .2 | .2 | .1 | 3.4 |
