= Bobby Cattage =

Retired American basketball player

Personal information
- Born: August 17, 1958 (age 68) Huntsville, Alabama, U.S.
- Listed height: 6 ft 9 in (2.06 m)
- Listed weight: 250 lb (113 kg)

Career information
- High school: J.O. Johnson (Huntsville, Alabama)
- College: Auburn (1977–1981)
- NBA draft: 1981: 8th round, 165th overall pick
- Drafted by: Utah Jazz
- Playing career: 1981–1988
- Position: Power forward
- Number: 43, 45

Career history
- 1981–1982: Utah Jazz
- 1982–1983: Billings Volcanos
- 1983–1984: Toronto Tornados
- 1984–1985: Albuquerque Silvers
- 1985–1986: New Jersey Nets
- 1988: Jollycolombani Forlì

Career highlights
- Second-team Parade All-American (1977)
- Stats at NBA.com
- Stats at Basketball Reference

Robert Lewis Cattage (born August 17, 1958) is an American former basketball player who had a brief career in the National Basketball Association (NBA), among other leagues.

== Early years ==
Born in Huntsville, Alabama, Cattage played basketball for Ed White Junior High and J.O. Johnson High School.

He played collegiately for the Auburn Tigers. On April 13, 1980, Cattage's appendix burst. He was hospitalized and required six operations, lost more than 40 pounds, and spent 59 days in the intensive care unit before returning to Auburn for his junior year.

== Pro career ==
He was selected by the Utah Jazz in the eighth round (165th pick overall) of the 1981 NBA draft.

He played for the Jazz (1981–82) and the New Jersey Nets (1985–86) in the NBA for a total of 78 games. In his only season with the Nets he earned a reported salary of $75,000. He was briefly signed by the Detroit Pistons but was cut in October 1984 before playing any games for the team.

He played for several teams in the Continental Basketball Association (CBA), including the Billings Volcanos.

== Career statistics ==
Legend
GP	Games played	GS	Games started	MPG	Minutes per game
FG%	Field goal percentage	3P%	3-point field goal percentage	FT%	Free throw percentage
RPG	Rebounds per game	APG	Assists per game	SPG	Steals per game
BPG	Blocks per game	PPG	Points per game	**Bold**	Career high

=== NBA ===
==== Regular season ====
Year	Team	GP	GS	MPG	FG%	3P%	FT%	RPG	APG	SPG	BPG	PPG
1981–82	Utah	**49**	0	**6.9**	**.444**	.000	.732	**1.5**	**.1**	.1	.0	3.1
1985–86	New Jersey	29	**1**	6.4	.337	**.200**	**.795**	1.2	**.1**	**.2**	.0	**3.2**
Career		78	1	6.7	.404	.143	.765	1.4	.1	.2	.0	3.1

== Awards and honors ==
In 2010, he was selected to the 1970s all-decade team of Madison County, Alabama, high school basketball players by Huntsville Times.
