= Lowes Moore =

American basketball player (born 1957)

Personal information
- Born: May 5, 1957 (age 69) Plymouth, North Carolina, U.S.
- Listed height: 6 ft 1 in (1.85 m)
- Listed weight: 170 lb (77 kg)

Career information
- High school: Mount Vernon (Mount Vernon, New York)
- College: West Virginia (1976–1980)
- NBA draft: 1980: 3rd round, 52nd overall pick
- Drafted by: New Jersey Nets
- Playing career: 1980–1992
- Position: Point guard
- Number: 11, 14, 13

Career history
- 1980–1981: New Jersey Nets
- 1981–1982: Billings Volcanos
- 1982: Cleveland Cavaliers
- 1982–1983: Billings Volcanos
- 1983: San Diego Clippers
- 1983–1985: Albany Patroons
- 1985: Westchester Golden Apples
- 1986–1989, 1991–1992: Albany Patroons

Career highlights
- 2× CBA champion (1984, 1988); All-CBA First Team (1983); 2× All-CBA Second Team (1982, 1985); CBA All-Defensive Second Team (1985); Fourth-team Parade All-American (1976)
- Stats at NBA.com
- Stats at Basketball Reference

Lowes Lee Moore (born May 5, 1957) is a former American National Basketball Association (NBA) player. Moore was a 2-time Continental Basketball Association (CBA) champion for the Albany Patroons under coaches Phil Jackson and George Karl. Most known for his 40-point performance against Notre Dame.

Moore was born in Plymouth, North Carolina. He was raised in Mount Vernon, New York, where he currently resides with his wife of 34 years, Patrice Wallace-Moore and their four children, Michelle, Shireyll, Lowes III, Isaiah, and their Godson Jamayal.

Lowes graduated from Mount Vernon High School in 1976 and West Virginia University in 1980. After receiving Basketball All-American Honorable Mention in his sophomore and junior years and All-American Honors in his senior year, he was drafted by the New Jersey Nets. He played three years in the NBA with the Nets, Cleveland Cavaliers and San Diego (Los Angeles) Clippers. He also spent five years in the Continental Basketball Association on two championship teams with the Albany Patroons. He has coached basketball on the high school, college and professional level.

After being selected by the New Jersey Nets in the 1980 NBA draft, Moore played in three seasons with three different teams: Nets, Cleveland Cavaliers, and San Diego Clippers. He is currently the executive director of the Boys & Girls Club of Mount Vernon, New York.

Moore played in the Continental Basketball Association (CBA) for the Billings Volcanos and Albany Patroons from 1981 to 1992. He won CBA championships with the Patroons in 1984 and 1988. He was selected to the All-CBA First Team in 1983, All-CBA Second Team in 1982 and 1985, and All-Defensive Second Team in 1985.

Moore received his license to preach the gospel from Macedonia Baptist Church in February, 1986 and is currently an ordained Elder at the Emmanuel Pentecostal Faith Temple, under the leadership of Bishop Leon Dixon. He established a program called the Hoop School in the 1980s in Albany, NY, where he and fellow professional athletes conducted motivational speeches and workshops for adolescents, parents, and coaches. Currently, this program is entitled Gospel Sports Today (Men N Charge).

Mr. Moore is currently the executive director of the Mount Vernon Boys and Girls Club.

== Career statistics ==
Legend
GP	Games played	GS	Games started	MPG	Minutes per game
FG%	Field goal percentage	3P%	3-point field goal percentage	FT%	Free throw percentage
RPG	Rebounds per game	APG	Assists per game	SPG	Steals per game
BPG	Blocks per game	PPG	Points per game	**Bold**	Career high

=== NBA ===
==== Regular season ====
Year	Team	GP	GS	MPG	FG%	3P%	FT%	RPG	APG	SPG	BPG	PPG
1980–81	New Jersey	**71**		**19.8**	.444	.148	**.750**	**2.4**	3.2	.9	.2	7.0
1981–82	Cleveland	4	0	17.5	**.500**	.200	**.750**	1.0	**3.8**	**1.5**	**.3**	**11.3**
1982–83	San Diego	37	**3**	17.4	.426	**.261**	**.750**	1.5	2.0	.6	.0	5.7
Career		112	3	18.9	.442	.200	.750	2.0	2.8	.8	.2	6.7
