= Dave Batton =

American basketball player (born 1956)

Personal information
- Born: March 26, 1956 (age 70) Baltimore, Maryland, U.S.
- Listed height: 6 ft 10 in (2.08 m)
- Listed weight: 240 lb (109 kg)

Career information
- High school: Delaware County (Springfield, Pennsylvania)
- College: Notre Dame (1974–1978)
- NBA draft: 1978: 3rd round, 62nd overall pick
- Drafted by: New Jersey Nets
- Playing career: 1978–1983
- Position: Center
- Number: 40, 45

Career history
- 1978–1979: Gabetti Cantù
- 1980–1981: Antonini Siena
- 1982–1983: Washington Bullets
- 1983: San Antonio Spurs

Career highlights
- FIBA Saporta Cup champion (1979); FIBA Saporta Cup Finals Top Scorer (1979); Third-team Parade All-American (1974)
- Stats at NBA.com
- Stats at Basketball Reference

David Robert Batton (born March 26, 1956) is a retired American professional basketball player. At a height of 2.08 m (6 ft 10 in) tall, he played at the center position.

== College career ==
Batton played college basketball at the University of Notre Dame, with the Fighting Irish.

== Professional career ==
After college, he was selected by the New Jersey Nets, in the 3rd round (62nd pick overall), of the 1978 NBA draft. He played for the Washington Bullets (1982–83), and San Antonio Spurs (1983–84), in the National Basketball Association, in 58 games.

== NBA career statistics ==
Legend
GP	Games played	GS	Games started	MPG	Minutes per game
FG%	Field goal percentage	3P%	3-point field goal percentage	FT%	Free throw percentage
RPG	Rebounds per game	APG	Assists per game	SPG	Steals per game
BPG	Blocks per game	PPG	Points per game	**Bold**	Career high

=== Regular season ===
Year	Team	GP	GS	MPG	FG%	3P%	FT%	RPG	APG	SPG	BPG	PPG
1982–83	Washington	**54**	**5**	**10.3**	.445	.000	**.471**	**2.2**	0.5	**0.3**	0.2	**3.3**
1983–84	San Antonio	4	0	7.8	**.500**	–	–	1.0	**0.8**	0.0	**0.8**	2.5
Career		58	5	10.2	.448	.000	.471	2.1	0.6	0.3	0.6	3.2
