= Joe Cooper (basketball) =

American basketball player (born 1957)

Personal information
- Born: September 1, 1957 (age 69) Houston, Texas, U.S.
- Listed height: 6 ft 9 in (2.06 m)
- Listed weight: 169 lb (77 kg)

Career information
- High school: Kashmere (Houston, Texas)
- College: Howard College (1976–1978); Tulsa (1978–1979); Colorado (1980–1981)
- NBA draft: 1981: 5th round, 95th overall pick
- Drafted by: New Jersey Nets
- Playing career: 1981–1991
- Position: Center / power forward
- Number: 44, 35, 4, 23, 53

Career history
- 1981: New Jersey Nets
- 1981–1985: Lancaster Lightning
- 1982: Los Angeles Lakers
- 1982: Washington Bullets
- 1983: San Diego Clippers
- 1985: Seattle SuperSonics
- 1985–1986: Hapoel Holon
- 1986–1988: Oximesa
- 1988–1989: Pamesa Valencia
- 1989–1990: Peñarol de Mar del Plata
- 1990–1991: Boca Juniors

Career highlights
- CBA champion (1982); All-CBA Second Team (1985)
- Stats at NBA.com
- Stats at Basketball Reference

Joseph Edward Cooper (born September 1, 1957) is an American former National Basketball Association (NBA) player. Drafted in the fifth round of the 1981 NBA draft by the New Jersey Nets, Cooper played 24 NBA games over the course of three seasons, making appearances for the Nets, the Los Angeles Lakers, the Washington Bullets, the San Diego Clippers and the Seattle SuperSonics.

Cooper played for the Lancaster Lightning of the Continental Basketball Association (CBA) from 1981 to 1985 and was selected to the All-CBA Second Team in 1985. He won a CBA championship with the Lightning in 1982.

== Career statistics ==
Legend
| GP | Games played | GS | Games started | MPG | Minutes per game |
| FG% | Field goal percentage | 3P% | 3-point field goal percentage | FT% | Free throw percentage |
| RPG | Rebounds per game | APG | Assists per game | SPG | Steals per game |
| BPG | Blocks per game | PPG | Points per game | **Bold** | Career high |

=== NBA ===
==== Regular season ====
| Year | Team | GP | GS | MPG | FG% | 3P% | FT% | RPG | APG | SPG | BPG | PPG |
|---|---|---|---|---|---|---|---|---|---|---|---|---|
| 1981–82 | New Jersey | 1 | 0 | 11.0 | .500 | – | – | 2.0 | .0 | .0 | .0 | 2.0 |
| 1982–83 | L.A. Lakers | 2 | 0 | 5.5 | .250 | – | – | 1.0 | .0 | .5 | .5 | 1.0 |
| 1982–83 | Washington | 5 | 0 | 9.4 | **.556** | – | **.556** | 2.6 | .4 | .0 | .0 | 3.0 |
| 1982–83 | San Diego | **13** | **4** | **21.2** | .525 | – | .550 | **5.5** | **1.2** | .6 | **1.5** | 5.6 |
| 1984–85 | Seattle | 3 | 1 | 15.0 | .467 | – | .500 | 3.0 | .7 | **.7** | .3 | **5.7** |
| Career | | 24 | 5 | 16.2 | .506 | – | .543 | 4.0 | .8 | .5 | .9 | 4.5 |
