= Horace Owens =

American basketball coach and former player

Delaware State Hornets
- Title: Assistant coach
- League: Mid-Eastern Athletic Conference

Personal information
- Born: October 9, 1961 (age 65) Philadelphia, Pennsylvania, U.S.
- Listed height: 6 ft 3 in (1.91 m)
- Listed weight: 190 lb (86 kg)

Career information
- High school: Dobbins Technical (Philadelphia, Pennsylvania)
- College: Rhode Island (1979–1983)
- NBA draft: 1983: 2nd round, 44th overall pick
- Drafted by: New Jersey Nets
- Position: Shooting guard
- Coaching career: 2004–present

Career history

Coaching
- 2004–2018: La Salle (assistant)
- 2021–present: Delaware State (assistant)

Career highlights
- AP Honorable Mention All-American (1983); First-team All-Atlantic 10 (1983); McDonald's All-American (1979)
- Stats at Basketball Reference

Horace G. “Pappy” Owens (born October 9, 1961) is an American basketball coach and former player who is an assistant coach for the Delaware State Hornets men's team.

Born in Philadelphia, Pennsylvania, he played for Dobbins Technical High School and was a McDonald's All-American in 1979. Owens played collegiately for the Rhode Island Rams, where he ranks seventh on the school's all-time scoring list. He was an honorable mention All-American and first team All-Atlantic 10 selection during his senior season. Owens was drafted by the New Jersey Nets as the 44th overall pick of the 1983 NBA draft. On October 25, 1983, he was traded alongside Eddie Phillips to the Philadelphia 76ers for Reggie Johnson and waived two days later as one of the team's last preseason cuts. Owens never played in the National Basketball Association (NBA).

Owens worked as a juvenile probation officer for the City of Philadelphia for fourteen years. In 2004, he joined the La Salle Explorers as an assistant coach and served that role for fourteen years. In 2018, he shifted roles to become a special assistant to head coach Ashley Howard. Owens joined the Delaware State Hornets as an assistant coach in July 2021.

Owens was inducted into the Philadelphia Black Basketball Hall of Fame in 2019.

== Career statistics ==
Legend
GP	Games played	GS	Games started	MPG	Minutes per game
FG%	Field goal percentage	3P%	3-point field goal percentage	FT%	Free throw percentage
RPG	Rebounds per game	APG	Assists per game	SPG	Steals per game
BPG	Blocks per game	PPG	Points per game	**Bold**	Career high

=== College ===
Year	Team	GP	GS	MPG	FG%	3P%	FT%	RPG	APG	SPG	BPG	PPG
1979–80	Rhode Island	28	–	31.6	**.473**	–	.756	2.6	2.5	.8	.1	12.3
1980–81	Rhode Island	**29**	**29**	34.3	.471	–	.729	3.0	2.9	**1.2**	.1	12.6
1981–82	Rhode Island	27	27	**38.0**	.452	–	.763	2.9	**3.0**	.9	**.3**	15.4
1982–83	Rhode Island	28	28	35.9	.447	–	**.800**	**6.7**	2.0	1.1	.1	**22.3**
Career		112	84	34.9	.458	–	.763	3.8	2.6	1.0	.2	15.6
