= 1983–84 Washington Bullets season =

NBA professional basketball team season

- Head coach: Gene Shue
- General manager: Bob Ferry
- Owner: Abe Pollin
- Arena: Capital Centre

Results
- Record: 35–47 (.427)
- Place: Division: 5th (Atlantic); Conference: 8th (Eastern)
- Playoff finish: First round (lost to Celtics 1–3)
- Stats at Basketball Reference

Local media
- Television: WDCA
- Radio: WTOP

The 1983–84 Washington Bullets season was the Bullets' 23rd season in the NBA and their 11th season in the city of Washington, D.C.

== Draft picks ==
Round	Pick	Player	Position	Nationality	College
1	10	Jeff Malone	SG	United States	Mississippi State
1	22	Randy Wittman	SG	United States	Indiana
2	32	Michael Britt		United States	District of Columbia
2	34	Guy Williams		United States	Washington State
3	57	Darren Daye	SF/SG	United States	UCLA
4	80	Dan Gay		United States	Louisiana-Lafayette
5	103	Robin Dixon		United States	New Hampshire
6	126	Donald Carroll		United States	Saint Augustine's
7	149	Danny Womack		United States	Winston-Salem State
8	172	Bernard Perry		United States	Howard
9	194	Ricky Moreland		United States	Maryland-Baltimore County
10	215	Isiah Singletary		United States	Saint Louis

== Roster ==
Washington Bullets roster
Players

Pos.	No.	Player	Height	Weight	DOB	From
F	42	Greg Ballard	6 ft 7 in (2.01 m)	215 lb (98 kg)		Oregon
SF	23	Charles Davis	6 ft 7 in (2.01 m)	215 lb (98 kg)		Vanderbilt
PG	15	Frank Johnson	6 ft 1 in (1.85 m)	185 lb (84 kg)		Wake Forest
PF	44	Rick Mahorn	6 ft 10 in (2.08 m)	240 lb (109 kg)		Hampton
G	24	Jeff Malone	6 ft 4 in (1.93 m)	205 lb (93 kg)		Mississippi State
C	54	Tom McMillen	6 ft 11 in (2.11 m)	215 lb (98 kg)		Maryland
C	43	Jeff Ruland	6 ft 10 in (2.08 m)	240 lb (109 kg)		Iona

Coaches
Head coach
- Gene Shue

Legend
- (DP) Unsigned draft pick
- (FA) Free agent
- (S) Suspended
- Injured

== Regular season ==
=== Season standings ===
Atlantic Division	W	L	PCT	GB	Home	Road	Div
y-Boston Celtics	62	20	.756	–	33–8	29–12	13–11
x-Philadelphia 76ers	52	30	.634	10	32–9	20–21	15–9
x-New York Knicks	47	35	.573	15	29–12	18–23	12–12
x-New Jersey Nets	45	37	.549	17	29–12	16–25	12–12
x-Washington Bullets	35	47	.427	27	25–16	10–31	8–16

#	Eastern Conference				
#	Team	W	L	PCT	GB
1	z-Boston Celtics	62	20	.756	–
2	y-Milwaukee Bucks	50	32	.610	12
3	x-Philadelphia 76ers	52	30	.634	10
4	x-Detroit Pistons	49	33	.598	13
5	x-New York Knicks	47	35	.573	15
6	x-New Jersey Nets	45	37	.549	17
7	x-Atlanta Hawks	40	42	.488	22
8	x-Washington Bullets	35	47	.427	27
9	Cleveland Cavaliers	28	54	.341	34
10	Chicago Bulls	27	55	.329	35
11	Indiana Pacers	26	56	.317	36

Notes

- z, y – division champions
- x – clinched playoff spot

== Game log ==
=== Regular season ===
1983–84 game log
Total: 35–47 (home: 25–16; road: 10–31)
October: 0–2 (home: 0–0; road: 0–2)

Game	Date	Team	Score	High points	High rebounds	High assists	Location Attendance	Record
1	October 28	@ Philadelphia	L 114–117				Spectrum	0–1
2	October 29	@ New York	L 97–100				Madison Square Garden	0–2

November: 6–8 (home: 5–4; road: 1–4)

Game	Date	Team	Score	High points	High rebounds	High assists	Location Attendance	Record
3	November 1	@ Atlanta	L 92–95				The Omni	0–3
4	November 3	Detroit	W 111–88				Capital Centre	1–3
5	November 5	Boston	L 117–120				Capital Centre	1–4
6	November 8	San Diego	W 119–113				Capital Centre	2–4
7	November 9	@ New Jersey	L 110–127				Brendan Byrne Arena	2–5
8	November 11	Chicago	W 125–124 (2OT)				Capital Centre	3–5
9	November 15	Kansas City	L 100–101				Capital Centre	3–6
10	November 17	Indiana	W 102–94				Capital Centre	4–6
11	November 19	Utah	W 126–113				Capital Centre	5–6
12	November 22	Golden State	L 101–102				Capital Centre	5–7
13	November 23	@ Cleveland	L 98–107				Richfield Coliseum	5–8
14	November 25	@ Detroit	W 120–111				Pontiac Silverdome	6–8
15	November 26	@ Milwaukee	L 92–109				MECCA Arena	6–9
16	November 29	Milwaukee	L 89–94				Capital Centre	6–10

December: 9–4 (home: 5–1; road: 4–3)

Game	Date	Team	Score	High points	High rebounds	High assists	Location Attendance	Record
17	December 1	@ New York	L 93–127				Madison Square Garden	6–11
18	December 3	Philadelphia	W 103–98				Capital Centre	7–11
19	December 6	@ Houston	W 113–109				The Summit	8–11
20	December 7	@ Dallas	W 114–112				Reunion Arena	9–11
21	December 10	@ San Antonio	L 102–125				HemisFair Arena	9–12
22	December 13	Atlanta	L 89–94				Capital Centre	9–13
23	December 14	@ Atlanta	W 99–96				The Omni	10–13
24	December 16	@ Boston	W 100–93				Boston Garden	11–13
25	December 17	Cleveland	W 119–95				Capital Centre	12–13
26	December 20	San Antonio	W 108–106 (OT)				Capital Centre	13–13
27	December 23	@ Chicago	L 93–114				Chicago Stadium	13–14
28	December 27	New Jersey	W 116–106				Capital Centre	14–14
29	December 30	New York	W 91–86				Capital Centre	15–14

January: 5–11 (home: 5–2; road: 0–9)

Game	Date	Team	Score	High points	High rebounds	High assists	Location Attendance	Record
30	January 3	Detroit	W 103–102				Capital Centre	16–14
31	January 4	@ Boston	L 104–113				Boston Garden	16–15
32	January 6	Chicago	W 96–88 (OT)				Capital Centre	17–15
33	January 7	@ Chicago	L 73–87				Chicago Stadium	17–16
34	January 9	@ New Jersey	L 103–107				Brendan Byrne Arena	17–17
35	January 11	@ Philadelphia	L 99–121				Spectrum	17–18
36	January 12	Atlanta	L 91–106				Capital Centre	17–19
37	January 14	@ Utah	L 96–121				Salt Palace Acord Arena	17–20
38	January 15	@ Phoenix	L 101–110				Arizona Veterans Memorial Coliseum	17–21
39	January 17	@ Los Angeles	L 95–108				The Forum	17–22
40	January 18	@ San Diego	L 101–110				San Diego Sports Arena	17–23
41	January 20	@ Milwaukee	L 103–133				MECCA Arena	17–24
42	January 21	Philadelphia	W 94–90				Capital Centre	18–24
43	January 24	Milwaukee	W 123–117 (2OT)				Capital Centre	19–24
44	January 26	New York	L 97–104				Capital Centre	19–25
All-Star Break
45	January 31	Atlanta	W 118–94				Capital Centre	20–25

February: 7–7 (home: 3–2; road: 4–5)

Game	Date	Team	Score	High points	High rebounds	High assists	Location Attendance	Record
46	February 2	Detroit	L 129–139				Capital Centre	20–26
47	February 4	Indiana	W 125–101				Capital Centre	21–26
48	February 7	Houston	W 95–92				Capital Centre	22–26
49	February 10	Los Angeles	W 96–93				Capital Centre	23–26
50	February 11	@ Kansas City	L 91–94				Kemper Arena	23–27
51	February 14	@ Denver	W 108–96				McNichols Sports Arena	24–27
52	February 15	@ Seattle	L 99–116				Kingdome	24–28
53	February 17	@ Portland	W 96–87				Memorial Coliseum	25–28
54	February 18	@ Golden State	L 107–113				Oakland–Alameda County Coliseum Arena	25–29
55	February 22	Portland	L 101–104				Capital Centre	25–30
56	February 24	@ Chicago	W 102–96				Chicago Stadium	26–30
57	February 25	@ Cleveland	L 83–94				Richfield Coliseum	26–31
58	February 28	@ Indiana	W 100–92				Market Square Arena	27–31
59	February 29	@ Detroit	L 106–137				Pontiac Silverdome	27–32

March: 5–11 (home: 4–5; road: 1–6)

Game	Date	Team	Score	High points	High rebounds	High assists	Location Attendance	Record
60	March 2	Milwaukee	L 78–98				Capital Centre	27–33
61	March 3	@ New Jersey	L 90–100				Brendan Byrne Arena	27–34
62	March 6	Boston	L 85–108				Capital Centre	27–35
63	March 8	Seattle	W 106–96				Capital Centre	28–35
64	March 10	@ Detroit	L 100–115				Pontiac Silverdome	28–36
65	March 13	Denver	W 108–103				Capital Centre	29–36
66	March 14	@ Boston	W 103–99				Boston Garden	30–36
67	March 16	Phoenix	L 109–110 (OT)				Capital Centre	30–37
68	March 18	@ Milwaukee	L 101–109				MECCA Arena	30–38
69	March 20	New Jersey	W 99–91				Capital Centre	31–38
70	March 22	Philadelphia	L 101–106				Capital Centre	31–39
71	March 24	@ New York	L 99–107				Madison Square Garden	31–40
72	March 25	@ Cleveland	L 96–101				Richfield Coliseum	31–41
73	March 27	Boston	L 93–106				Capital Centre	31–42
74	March 28	@ Philadelphia	L 103–109				Spectrum	31–43
75	March 30	New York	W 107–79				Capital Centre	32–43

April: 3–4 (home: 3–2; road: 0–2)

Game	Date	Team	Score	High points	High rebounds	High assists	Location Attendance	Record
76	April 1	Dallas	W 102–98				Capital Centre	33–43
77	April 3	Indiana	W 106–94				Capital Centre	34–43
78	April 4	@ Atlanta	L 92–99				The Omni	34–44
79	April 7	New Jersey	L 98–121				Capital Centre	34–45
80	April 9	Chicago	W 136–134 (2OT)				Capital Centre	35–45
81	April 13	@ Indiana	L 115–119				Market Square Arena	35–46
82	April 14	Cleveland	L 109–117				Capital Centre	35–47

1983–84 schedule

== Playoffs ==
1984 playoff game log
Eastern Conference First Round: 1–3 (home: 1–1; road: 0–2)

Game	Date	Team	Score	High points	High rebounds	High assists	Location Attendance	Series
1	April 17	@ Boston	L 83–91	Sobers (24)	Mahorn (14)	Ruland (10)	Boston Garden; 14,890	0–1
2	April 19	@ Boston	L 85–88	Ballard (20)	Ruland (10)	Ruland (8)	Boston Garden; 14,890	0–2
3	April 21	Boston	W 111–108 (OT)	Ruland (33)	Mahorn (15)	Sobers (11)	Capital Centre; 8,359	1–2
4	April 24	Boston	L 96–99	Ruland (30)	Ruland (15)	Ruland (8)	Capital Centre; 13,853	1–3

1984 schedule

== Awards and records ==
- Jeff Malone, NBA All-Rookie Team 1st Team

== See also ==
- 1983–84 NBA season
