= 1983–84 Seattle SuperSonics season =

NBA professional basketball team season

- Head coach: Lenny Wilkens
- General manager: Les Habegger
- Owner: Barry Ackerley
- Arena: Kingdome

Results
- Record: 42–40 (.512)
- Place: Division: 3rd (Pacific); Conference: 5th (Western)
- Playoff finish: First round (lost to Mavericks 2–3)
- Stats at Basketball Reference

Local media
- Television: KIRO-TV
- Radio: KING

The 1983–84 Seattle SuperSonics season was the SuperSonics' 17th season in the NBA.

In the playoffs, the SuperSonics lost to the Dallas Mavericks in five games in the First Round.

== Offseason ==
=== Draft ===
Round	Pick	Player	Position	Nationality	College
1	16	Jon Sundvold	PG/SG	United States	Missouri
2	36	Scooter McCray	PF	United States	Louisville
3	63	Frank Burnell	G	United States	Stetson
4	86	Pete DeBisschop	C	United States	Fairfield
5	109	Brad Watson	G	United States	Washington
6	132	Tony Wilson	F	United States	Western Kentucky
7	155	Tony Gattis	F	United States	Mercer
8	178	Ray Smith	F	United States	Armstrong Atlantic State
9	200	Tony Washington	G	United States	Hampton
10	221	David Binion	F	United States	North Carolina Central

== Roster ==
1983–84 Seattle SuperSonics roster
Players

Pos.	No.	Player	Height	Weight	DOB	From
SG	32	Fred Brown	6 ft 3 in (1.91 m)	182 lb (83 kg)	1948-08-07	Iowa
C	40	James Donaldson	7 ft 2 in (2.18 m)	275 lb (125 kg)	1957-08-16	Washington State
PF	24	Tom Chambers	6 ft 10 in (2.08 m)	220 lb (100 kg)	1959-06-21	Utah
PF	10	Steve Hawes	6 ft 9 in (2.06 m)	220 lb (100 kg)	1950-05-26	Washington
C	41	Steve Hayes	7 ft 0 in (2.13 m)	205 lb (93 kg)	1955-08-02	Idaho State
SG	34	Clay Johnson	6 ft 4 in (1.93 m)	175 lb (79 kg)	1956-07-18	Missouri
SF	51	Reggie King	6 ft 6 in (1.98 m)	225 lb (102 kg)	1957-02-14	Alabama
PF	21	Scooter McCray	6 ft 9 in (2.06 m)	215 lb (98 kg)	1960-02-08	Louisville
C	43	Jack Sikma	6 ft 11 in (2.11 m)	230 lb (104 kg)	1955-11-14	Illinois Wesleyan
PG	20	Jon Sundvold	6 ft 2 in (1.88 m)	170 lb (77 kg)	1961-07-02	Missouri
SG	44	David Thompson	6 ft 4 in (1.93 m)	195 lb (88 kg)	1954-07-13	NC State
SF	23	Danny Vranes	6 ft 7 in (2.01 m)	210 lb (95 kg)	1958-10-29	Utah
PG	1	Gus Williams	6 ft 2 in (1.88 m)	175 lb (79 kg)	1953-10-10	USC
SG	4	Al Wood	6 ft 6 in (1.98 m)	193 lb (88 kg)	1958-06-02	North Carolina

Coaches
Head coach
- Lenny Wilkens
Assistant(s)
- Dave Harshman

Legend
- (DP) Unsigned draft pick
- (FA) Free agent
- (S) Suspended
- Injured

Roster
Updated: December 8, 1983

== Standings ==
=== Division ===
Pacific Division	W	L	PCT	GB	Home	Road	Div
y-Los Angeles Lakers	54	28	.659	–	28–13	26–15	18–12
x-Portland Trail Blazers	48	34	.585	6	33–8	15–26	17–13
x-Seattle SuperSonics	42	40	.512	12	32–9	10–31	14–16
x-Phoenix Suns	41	41	.500	13	31–10	10–31	16–14
Golden State Warriors	37	45	.451	17	27–14	10–31	13–17
San Diego Clippers	30	52	.366	24	25–16	5–36	12–18

=== Conference ===
#	Western Conference				
#	Team	W	L	PCT	GB
1	c-Los Angeles Lakers	54	28	.659	–
2	y-Utah Jazz	45	37	.549	9
3	x-Portland Trail Blazers	48	34	.585	6
4	x-Dallas Mavericks	43	39	.524	11
5	x-Seattle SuperSonics	42	40	.512	12
6	x-Phoenix Suns	41	41	.500	13
7	x-Denver Nuggets	38	44	.463	16
8	x-Kansas City Kings	38	44	.463	16
9	San Antonio Spurs	37	45	.451	17
10	Golden State Warriors	37	45	.451	17
11	San Diego Clippers	30	52	.366	24
12	Houston Rockets	29	53	.354	25

z – clinched division title
y – clinched division title
x – clinched playoff spot

== Game log ==
=== Regular season ===
Game	Date	Opponent	Score	Record
1	October 28	Golden State	L 109–110	0–1
2	October 30	@ Kansas City	W 121–116	1–1
3	November 1	@ Phoenix	W 103–93	2–1
4	November 2	New York	W 125–119	3–1
5	November 4	@ San Diego	L 97–121	3–2
6	November 6	@ San Antonio	L 115–132	3–3
7	November 8	Phoenix	W 123–116	4–3
8	November 9	Cleveland	W 113–101	5–3
9	November 11	Atlanta	W 104–93	6–3
10	November 13	@ Milwaukee	L 107–108	6–4
11	November 16	@ Detroit	L 120–122	6–5
12	November 17	@ Chicago	W 119–110	7–5
13	November 19	@ Atlanta	L 92–104	7–6
14	November 23	Los Angeles	W 106–98	8–6
15	November 25	Portland	L 90–100	8–7
16	November 26	@ Portland	L 94–122	8–8
17	November 29	San Diego	W 119–114	9–8
18	December 2	@ Houston	L 102–125	9–9
19	December 3	@ Denver	L 111–121	9–10
20	December 6	@ Golden State	L 103–108	9–11
21	December 9	Dallas	W 132–124	10–11
22	December 11	Detroit	W 135–131	11–11
23	December 13	@ Portland	L 89–102	11–12
24	December 14	Kansas City	L 99–105	11–13
25	December 16	New Jersey	W 110–106	12–13
26	December 20	Los Angeles	L 102–108	12–14
27	December 22	Houston	L 112–116	12–15
28	December 28	Utah	L 105–113	12–16
29	December 30	Philadelphia	W 97–93 (OT)	13–16
30	January 3	@ Denver	W 110–109	14–16
31	January 4	@ Dallas	L 102–105	14–17
32	January 6	Houston	W 118–102	15–17
33	January 8	Portland	W 125–110	16–17
34	January 10	San Diego	W 111–106	17–17
35	January 13	Phoenix	W 103–99	18–17
36	January 15	@ Los Angeles	W 102–91	19–17
37	January 18	Dallas	W 114–107	20–17
38	January 20	@ San Diego	W 110–108	21–17
39	January 21	@ Phoenix	L 102–131	21–18
40	January 24	@ San Antonio	L 109–117	21–19
41	January 26	@ Kansas City	W 114–106	22–19
42	January 31	@ Utah	L 94–98 (OT)	22–20
43	February 1	Milwaukee	W 99–98	23–20
44	February 3	San Antonio	W 121–106	24–20
45	February 5	Dallas	W 104–96	25–20
46	February 7	Denver	W 115–105	26–20
47	February 9	@ Indiana	L 102–107	26–21
48	February 10	@ Cleveland	L 90–95	26–22
49	February 14	@ Golden State	L 102–105	26–23
50	February 15	Washington	W 116–99	27–23
51	February 17	Boston	L 100–111	27–24
52	February 19	Denver	W 132–120	28–24
53	February 21	@ Los Angeles	L 112–128	28–25
54	February 22	Los Angeles	W 121–114	29–25
55	February 24	Utah	W 112–81	30–25
56	February 26	San Diego	L 93–101	30–26
57	February 28	@ Houston	L 105–111	30–27
58	February 29	@ Dallas	W 127–124	31–27
59	March 2	Indiana	W 99–90	32–27
60	March 4	@ Boston	L 93–117	32–28
61	March 6	@ New York	L 110–124	32–29
62	March 8	@ Washington	L 96–106	32–30
63	March 9	@ Philadelphia	L 84–92	32–31
64	March 11	@ New Jersey	L 105–106	32–32
65	March 13	@ Los Angeles	L 98–114	32–33
66	March 15	Chicago	W 106–90	33–33
67	March 16	San Antonio	W 126–123	34–33
68	March 18	Golden State	W 126–99	35–33
69	March 20	@ Golden State	L 102–103	35–34
70	March 21	Phoenix	W 104–102	36–34
71	March 23	@ San Diego	L 102–108	36–35
72	March 25	Utah	L 98–121	36–36
73	March 27	@ Portland	L 87–93	36–37
74	March 28	Kansas City	W 111–94	37–37
75	March 29	@ Utah	L 96–106	37–38
76	March 31	@ San Antonio	W 124–106	38–38
77	April 3	@ Denver	L 113–124	38–39
78	April 6	@ Phoenix	L 108–117	38–40
79	April 8	Houston	W 120–107	39–40
80	April 10	@ Kansas City	W 125–113	40–40
81	April 12	Golden State	W 105–100	41–40
82	April 15	Portland	W 108–103	42–40

=== Playoffs ===
1984 playoff game log
First round: 2–3 (home: 1–1; road: 1–2)

Game	Date	Team	Score	High points	High rebounds	High assists	Location Attendance	Series
1	April 17	@ Dallas	L 86–88	Gus Williams (37)	Danny Vranes (8)	Gus Williams (8)	Reunion Arena; 17,007	0–1
2	April 19	@ Dallas	W 95–92	Tom Chambers (30)	Jack Sikma (10)	Gus Williams (11)	Reunion Arena; 17,007	1–1
3	April 21	Dallas	W 104–94	Jack Sikma (23)	Jack Sikma (17)	Gus Williams (15)	Seattle Center Coliseum; 10,229	2–1
4	April 24	Dallas	L 96–107	Jack Sikma (27)	Jack Sikma (14)	Gus Williams (9)	Kingdome; 11,893	2–2
5	April 26	@ Dallas	L 104–105 (OT)	Gus Williams (27)	Danny Vranes (11)	Gus Williams (14)	Moody Coliseum; 9,007	2–3

1984 schedule

== Player stats ==
Legend
GP	Games played	GS	Games started	MPG	Minutes per game
FG%	Field-goal percentage	3P%	3-point field-goal percentage	FT%	Free-throw percentage
RPG	Rebounds per game	APG	Assists per game	SPG	Steals per game
BPG	Blocks per game	PPG	Points per game

=== Regular season ===
Player	GP	FG	FT	FTA	AST	PTS
Jack Sikma	82	576	411	480	327	1563
Gus Williams	80	598	297	396	675	1497
Tom Chambers	82	554	375	469	133	1483
Al Wood	81	467	223	271	166	1160
Danny Vranes	80	258	153	236	132	669
Reggie King	77	233	136	206	179	602
Fred Brown	71	258	77	86	194	602
Jon Sundvold	73	217	64	72	239	507
Steve Hawes	79	114	61	78	99	290
David Thompson	19	89	62	73	13	240
Scooter McCray	47	47	35	50	44	129
Steve Hayes	43	26	5	14	13	57
Clay Johnson	25	20	14	22	14	55
Charles Bradley	8	3	5	7	5	11

== Awards and records ==
1984 NBA All-Star Game selections (game played on January 29, 1984)

- Jack Sikma

== Transactions ==
=== Subtractions ===
Date	Player	Reason left	New team
December 8, 1983	Charles Bradley	Waived	N/A

== See also ==
- 1983–84 NBA season
