= 1983–84 Houston Rockets season =

- Head coach: Bill Fitch
- General manager: Ray Patterson
- Owner: Charlie Thomas
- Arena: The Summit

Results
- Record: 29–53 (.354)
- Place: Division: 6th (Midwest); Conference: 12th (Western)
- Playoff finish: Did not qualify
- Stats at Basketball Reference

Local media
- Television: KTXH; Home Sports Entertainment
- Radio: KTRH

The 1983–84 Houston Rockets season featured the NBA debut of Ralph Sampson, whom the Rockets had selected as the first pick of the 1983 NBA draft. Under head coach Bill Fitch, the team finished with a 29–53 record, although Sampson won the NBA Rookie of the Year Award.

The team has been cited as an example of a "tanking", by deciding to play more bench players after starting the season with a 20–26 record, in order to fall in the standings and get higher in the draft order for the following season. The Rockets finished last in the Western Conference and later won a coin flip that gave them the first section in the 1984 NBA draft, with which they selected Hakeem Olajuwon.

== Draft picks ==
Round	Pick	Player	Position	Nationality	College/Club team
1	1	Ralph Sampson	C/PF	United States	Virginia
1	3	Rodney McCray	SF	United States	Louisville
3	48	Craig Ehlo	SG	United States	Washington State
4	71	Darrell Browder		United States	TCU
5	94	Chuck Barnett		United States	Oklahoma
6	117	Jim Stack		United States	Northwestern
7	140	Brian Kellerman		United States	Idaho
8	163	Jeff Bolding		United States	Arkansas State
9	185	James Campbell		United States	Oklahoma City

== Roster ==
1983–84 Houston Rockets roster
Players

Pos.	No.	Player	Height	Weight	DOB	From
PF	2	James Bailey	6 ft 9 in (2.06 m)	220 lb (100 kg)	1957–05–21	Rutgers
SG	3	Craig Ehlo	6 ft 6 in (1.98 m)	180 lb (82 kg)	1961–08–11	Washington State
PG	1	Phil Ford	6 ft 2 in (1.88 m)	175 lb (79 kg)	1956–06–02	North Carolina
PF	44	Elvin Hayes	6 ft 9 in (2.06 m)	235 lb (107 kg)	1945–11–17	Houston
C	27	Caldwell Jones	6 ft 11 in (2.11 m)	217 lb (98 kg)	1950–08–04	Albany State
PF	11	Major Jones	6 ft 9 in (2.06 m)	225 lb (102 kg)	1953–07–09	Albany State
PG	30	Allen Leavell	6 ft 1 in (1.85 m)	170 lb (77 kg)	1957–05–27	Oklahoma City
SG	32	Lewis Lloyd	6 ft 6 in (1.98 m)	205 lb (93 kg)	1959–02–22	Drake
SF	22	Rodney McCray	6 ft 7 in (2.01 m)	220 lb (100 kg)	1961–08–29	Louisville
SF	33	Robert Reid	6 ft 8 in (2.03 m)	205 lb (93 kg)	1955–08–30	Saint Mary's
C	50	Ralph Sampson	7 ft 4 in (2.24 m)	228 lb (103 kg)	1960–07–07	Virginia
SG	20	Terry Teagle	6 ft 5 in (1.96 m)	195 lb (88 kg)	1960–04–10	Baylor
SF	42	Wally Walker	6 ft 7 in (2.01 m)	190 lb (86 kg)	1954–07–18	Virginia

Coaches
Head coach
- Bill Fitch

Legend
- (DP) Unsigned draft pick
- (FA) Free agent
- (S) Suspended
- Injured

Roster

== Regular season ==
=== Season standings ===
Midwest Division	W	L	PCT	GB	Home	Road	Div
y-Utah Jazz	45	37	.549	–	31–10	14–27	15–15
x-Dallas Mavericks	43	39	.524	2	31–10	12–29	19–11
x-Denver Nuggets	38	44	.463	7	27–14	11–30	16–14
x-Kansas City Kings	38	44	.463	7	26–15	12–29	16–14
San Antonio Spurs	37	45	.451	8	28–13	9–32	14–16
Houston Rockets	29	53	.354	16	21–20	8–33	9–21

#	Western Conference				
#	Team	W	L	PCT	GB
1	c-Los Angeles Lakers	54	28	.659	–
2	y-Utah Jazz	45	37	.549	9
3	x-Portland Trail Blazers	48	34	.585	6
4	x-Dallas Mavericks	43	39	.524	11
5	x-Seattle SuperSonics	42	40	.512	12
6	x-Phoenix Suns	41	41	.500	13
7	x-Denver Nuggets	38	44	.463	16
8	x-Kansas City Kings	38	44	.463	16
9	San Antonio Spurs	37	45	.451	17
10	Golden State Warriors	37	45	.451	17
11	San Diego Clippers	30	52	.366	24
12	Houston Rockets	29	53	.354	25

== Game log ==
=== Regular season ===
1983–84 game log
Total: 29–53 (Home: 21–20; Road: 8–33)
October: 1–0 (home: 1–0; road: 0–0)

Game	Date	Team	Score	High points	High rebounds	High assists	Location Attendance	Record

November: 5–10 (home: 4–4; road: 1–6)

Game	Date	Team	Score	High points	High rebounds	High assists	Location Attendance	Record
4	November 4	@ Detroit	W 113–108				Pontiac Silverdome	2–2
5	November 5	@ Kansas City	L 106–123				Kemper Arena	2–3
6	November 8	Portland	L 104–122				The Summit	2–4
7	November 10	Utah	L 109–118				The Summit	2–5
8	November 12	Dallas	W 100–98				The Summit	3–5
9	November 15	New Jersey	L 86–104				The Summit	3–6
10	November 18	@ Denver	L 127–134				McNichols Sports Arena	3–7
12	November 22	Phoenix	W 118–96				The Summit	5–7
13	November 25	Philadelphia	L 101–115				The Summit	5–8
14	November 26	@ Atlanta	L 109–115				The Omni	5–9
16	November 30	@ Dallas	L 102–113				Reunion Arena	6–10

December: 6–9 (home: 4–3; road: 2–6)

Game	Date	Team	Score	High points	High rebounds	High assists	Location Attendance	Record
17	December 2	Seattle	W 125–102				The Summit	7–10
18	December 3	@ New York	L 101–117				Madison Square Garden	7–11
19	December 6	Washington	L 109–113				The Summit	7–12
20	December 7	@ Milwaukee	L 101–103				MECCA Arena	7–13
22	December 10	Utah	L 121–128				The Summit	8–14
23	December 13	Phoenix	W 129–110				The Summit	9–14
24	December 15	@ Utah	L 111–138				Salt Palace Acord Arena	9–15
27	December 22	@ Seattle	W 116–112				Kingdome	11–16
28	December 23	@ Portland	L 84–97				Memorial Coliseum	11–17
30	December 29	Boston	W 107–94				The Summit	12–18
31	December 30	@ Phoenix	L 110–121				Arizona Veterans Memorial Coliseum	12–19

January: 7–7 (home: 5–3; road: 2–4)

Game	Date	Team	Score	High points	High rebounds	High assists	Location Attendance	Record
32	January 3	Dallas	L 117–119				The Summit	12–20
33	January 4	@ Utah (at Las Vegas, Nevada)	L 111–116				Thomas & Mack Center	12–21
34	January 6	@ Seattle	W 116–112				Kingdome	12–22
35	January 8	@ Los Angeles	W 129–118				The Forum	13–22
36	January 10	Los Angeles	L 132–136 (OT)				The Summit	13–23
37	January 12	Portland	L 117–120				The Summit	13–24
39	January 14	Kansas City	W 109–104				The Summit	15–24
40	January 17	Denver	W 124–115				The Summit	16–24
42	January 21	Utah	W 115–105				The Summit	18–24
44	January 26	@ Los Angeles	L 102–131				The Forum	18–26
All-Star Break
45	January 31	@ Kansas City	W 122–107				Kemper Arena	19–26

February: 4–9 (home: 3–4; road: 1–5)

Game	Date	Team	Score	High points	High rebounds	High assists	Location Attendance	Record
46	February 2	Dallas	W 123–107				The Summit	20–26
47	February 4	New York	L 95–103				The Summit	20–27
48	February 7	@ Washington	L 92–95				Capital Centre	20–28
49	February 8	@ Philadelphia	L 107–118				The Spectrum	20–29
50	February 10	@ Boston	L 101–114				Boston Garden	20–30
51	February 12	@ New Jersey	L 103–107				Brendan Byrne Arena	20–31
52	February 14	Detroit	L 119–126				The Summit	20–32
54	February 18	Phoenix	L 102–126				The Summit	21–33
55	February 21	Milwaukee	W 119–102				The Summit	22–33
56	February 22	@ Dallas	L 106–112				Reunion Arena	22–34
58	February 28	Seattle	W 111–105				The Summit	23–35

March: 5–11 (home: 4–4; road: 1–7)

Game	Date	Team	Score	High points	High rebounds	High assists	Location Attendance	Record
59	March 1	Kansas City	L 101–108				The Summit	23–36
61	March 6	@ Denver	L 128–130				McNichols Sports Arena	24–37
62	March 7	@ Phoenix	L 110–123				Arizona Veterans Memorial Coliseum	24–38
67	March 17	Los Angeles	L 111–123				The Summit	26–41
68	March 20	Kansas City	L 102–115				The Summit	26–42
69	March 21	@ Denver	L 125–134				McNichols Sports Arena	26–43
70	March 23	@ Dallas	L 104–116				Reunion Arena	26–44
71	March 24	Atlanta	W 103–102				The Summit	27–44
72	March 27	Denver	W 140–137				The Summit	28–44
73	March 29	@ Los Angeles	L 109–115				The Forum	28–45
74	March 31	Portland	L 102–106				The Summit	28–46

April: 1–7 (home: 0–2; road: 1–5)

Game	Date	Team	Score	High points	High rebounds	High assists	Location Attendance	Record
75	April 2	@ Utah	L 100–111				Salt Palace Acord Arena	28–47
77	April 5	@ Portland	W 129–114				Memorial Coliseum	29–48
78	April 8	@ Seattle (at Tacoma, Washington)	L 107–120				Tacoma Dome	29–49
80	April 11	Denver	L 110–130				The Summit	29–51
82	April 14	@ Kansas City	L 96–108				Kemper Arena	29–53

1983–84 schedule

== Player statistics ==
Legend
GP	Games played	GS	Games started	MPG	Minutes per game
FG%	Field-goal percentage	3P%	3-point field-goal percentage	FT%	Free-throw percentage
RPG	Rebounds per game	APG	Assists per game	SPG	Steals per game
BPG	Blocks per game	PPG	Points per game

=== Season ===
Player	GP	GS	MPG	FG%	3FG%	FT%	RPG	APG	SPG	BPG	PPG

== Awards and records ==
=== Awards ===
- Ralph Sampson, NBA Rookie of the Year Award
- Ralph Sampson, All-NBA Second Team
- Ralph Sampson, NBA All-Rookie Team 1st Team

== Transactions ==
=== Free agents ===
==== Additions ====
Player	Signed	Former team

==== Subtractions ====
Player	Left	New team

== See also ==
- 1983–84 NBA season
