= 1983–84 Phoenix Suns season =

NBA team season

- Head coach: John MacLeod
- General manager: Jerry Colangelo
- Owners: Karl Eller, Don Pitt, Don Diamond, Bhavik Darji, Marvin Meyer, Richard L. Bloch
- Arena: Arizona Veterans Memorial Coliseum

Results
- Record: 41–41 (.500)
- Place: Division: 4th (Pacific); Conference: 6th (Western)
- Playoff finish: Conference finals (lost to Lakers 2–4)
- Stats at Basketball Reference

Local media
- Television: KNXV
- Radio: KTAR

The 1983–84 Phoenix Suns season was the 16th season for the Phoenix Suns of the National Basketball Association. The Suns were in the playoffs for the seventh consecutive season, extending a then-franchise record. The Suns eliminated their first round opponent, Portland, three games to two before defeating the Utah Jazz and NBA leading scorer, Adrian Dantley, four games to two. In the Western Conference Finals, the Suns lost to the Los Angeles Lakers in six games. The team was led by head coach John MacLeod, in his 11th year with the Suns, and played all home games in Arizona Veterans Memorial Coliseum.

Walter Davis led the Suns in scoring with 20 points per game. Larry Nance, who finished the season fourth in the NBA in blocks per game for the second straight year, was second in team scoring at 17.7. Davis returned to the All-Star Game, the only Sun from the season to be selected to do so. Maurice Lucas again averaged a double-double again for the Suns with 16 points and 10 rebounds per game.

Although Nance did not earn his first All-Star selection until the next season, he did participate in the NBA's first Slam Dunk Contest on All-Star Weekend. While Julius Erving ("Dr. J") provided a memorable dunk from the foul line, it was Nance who was crowned the league's first Slam Dunk champion.

== Draft picks ==
Round	Pick	Player	Position	Nationality	College
2	28	Rod Foster	Guard	United States	UCLA
2	45	Paul Williams	Guard	United States	Arizona State
3	51	Dereck Whittenburg	Guard	United States	North Carolina State
4	89	Sam Mosley	Forward	United States	Nevada
5	113	Rick Lamb	Forward	United States	Illinois State
6	135	Edward Bona	Forward	United States	Fordham
7	159	Fred Brown	Guard	United States	Virginia Commonwealth
8	181	Mike Mulquin	Forward	United States	Villanova
9	204	Joe Dykstra	Guard	United States	Western Illinois
10	224	Bo Overton	Guard	United States	Oklahoma

== Roster ==
1983–84 Phoenix Suns roster
Players

Pos.	No.	Player	Height	Weight	DOB	From
C	33	Alvan Adams	6 ft 9 in (2.06 m)	210 lb (95 kg)	1954-07-19	Oklahoma
G/F	6	Walter Davis	6 ft 6 in (1.98 m)	193 lb (88 kg)	1954-09-09	North Carolina
C	53	James Edwards	7 ft 0 in (2.13 m)	225 lb (102 kg)	1955-11-22	Washington
PG	10	Rod Foster	6 ft 1 in (1.85 m)	160 lb (73 kg)	1960-10-10	UCLA
F/C	20	Maurice Lucas	6 ft 9 in (2.06 m)	215 lb (98 kg)	1952-02-18	Marquette
PG	4	Kyle Macy	6 ft 3 in (1.91 m)	175 lb (79 kg)	1957-04-09	Kentucky
F	22	Larry Nance	6 ft 10 in (2.08 m)	205 lb (93 kg)	1959-02-12	Clemson
F	32	Charles Pittman	6 ft 8 in (2.03 m)	220 lb (100 kg)	1958-03-23	Maryland
C	8	Rick Robey	6 ft 11 in (2.11 m)	230 lb (104 kg)	1956-01-30	Kentucky
SF	7	Mike Sanders	6 ft 6 in (1.98 m)	210 lb (95 kg)	1960-05-07	UCLA
SF	14	Alvin Scott	6 ft 7 in (2.01 m)	185 lb (84 kg)	1955-09-14	Oral Roberts
SG	44	Paul Westphal	6 ft 4 in (1.93 m)	195 lb (88 kg)	1950-11-30	USC

Coaches
Head coach
- (United States) John MacLeod (Bellarmine)
Assistant(s)
- (United States) Al Bianchi (Bowling Green)
- (United States) John Wetzel (Virginia Tech)

Legend
- (DP) Unsigned draft pick
- (FA) Free agent
- (S) Suspended
- Injured

== Regular season ==
=== Standings ===
Pacific Division	W	L	PCT	GB	Home	Road	Div
y-Los Angeles Lakers	54	28	.659	–	28–13	26–15	18–12
x-Portland Trail Blazers	48	34	.585	6	33–8	15–26	17–13
x-Seattle SuperSonics	42	40	.512	12	32–9	10–31	14–16
x-Phoenix Suns	41	41	.500	13	31–10	10–31	16–14
Golden State Warriors	37	45	.451	17	27–14	10–31	13–17
San Diego Clippers	30	52	.366	24	25–16	5–36	12–18

#	Western Conference				
#	Team	W	L	PCT	GB
1	c-Los Angeles Lakers	54	28	.659	–
2	y-Utah Jazz	45	37	.549	9
3	x-Portland Trail Blazers	48	34	.585	6
4	x-Dallas Mavericks	43	39	.524	11
5	x-Seattle SuperSonics	42	40	.512	12
6	x-Phoenix Suns	41	41	.500	13
7	x-Denver Nuggets	38	44	.463	16
8	x-Kansas City Kings	38	44	.463	16
9	San Antonio Spurs	37	45	.451	17
10	Golden State Warriors	37	45	.451	17
11	San Diego Clippers	30	52	.366	24
12	Houston Rockets	29	53	.354	25

== Game log ==
=== Regular season ===
1983–84 game log
Total: 41–41 (Home: 31–10; Road: 10–31)
October: 0–1 (home: 0–0; road: 0–1)

Game	Date	Team	Score	High points	High rebounds	High assists	Location Attendance	Record
1	October 29, 1983	@ Dallas	L 103–120				Reunion Arena	0–1

November: 5–11 (home: 4–4; road: 1–7)

Game	Date	Team	Score	High points	High rebounds	High assists	Location Attendance	Record
2	November 1, 1983	Seattle	L 93–103				Arizona Veterans Memorial Coliseum	0–2
3	November 3, 1983	San Antonio	W 142–120				Arizona Veterans Memorial Coliseum	1–2
4	November 6, 1983	@ Portland	L 96–122				Memorial Coliseum	1–3
5	November 8, 1983	@ Seattle	L 116–123				Kingdome	1–4
6	November 10, 1983	@ Golden State	W 104–99				Oakland–Alameda County Coliseum Arena	2–4
7	November 11, 1983	@ Los Angeles	L 105–119				The Forum	2–5
8	November 13, 1983	Golden State	W 113–98				Arizona Veterans Memorial Coliseum	3–5
9	November 16, 1983	Cleveland	W 115–104				Arizona Veterans Memorial Coliseum	4–5
10	November 18, 1983	Milwaukee	L 94–109				Arizona Veterans Memorial Coliseum	4–6
11	November 19, 1983	@ Dallas	L 107–116				Reunion Arena	4–7
12	November 22, 1983	@ Houston	L 96–118				The Summit	4–8
13	November 23, 1983	New Jersey	L 108–110				Arizona Veterans Memorial Coliseum	4–9
14	November 25, 1983	Chicago	W 120–94				Arizona Veterans Memorial Coliseum	5–9
15	November 26, 1983	@ Denver	L 104–107				McNichols Sports Arena	5–10
16	November 29, 1983	@ Utah (at Las Vegas, Nevada)	L 110–114				Thomas & Mack Center	5–11
17	November 30, 1983	Kansas City	L 118–120				Arizona Veterans Memorial Coliseum	5–12

December: 10–4 (home: 7–2; road: 3–2)

Game	Date	Team	Score	High points	High rebounds	High assists	Location Attendance	Record
18	December 2, 1983	Utah	L 113–116				Arizona Veterans Memorial Coliseum	5–13
19	December 4, 1983	@ San Antonio	W 122–106				HemisFair Arena	6–13
20	December 6, 1983	@ Atlanta	L 88–95				The Omni	6–14
21	December 8, 1983	New York	W 120–97				Arizona Veterans Memorial Coliseum	7–14
22	December 10, 1983	San Diego	W 109–93				Arizona Veterans Memorial Coliseum	8–14
23	December 13, 1983	@ Houston	L 110–129				The Summit	8–15
24	December 15, 1983	Los Angeles	W 114–104				Arizona Veterans Memorial Coliseum	9–15
25	December 17, 1983	Kansas City	W 119–99				Arizona Veterans Memorial Coliseum	10–15
26	December 20, 1983	@ Golden State	W 109–105				Oakland–Alameda County Coliseum Arena	11–15
27	December 21, 1983	Portland	L 112–116				Arizona Veterans Memorial Coliseum	11–16
28	December 23, 1983	@ San Diego	W 121–115				San Diego Sports Arena	12–16
29	December 26, 1983	Denver	W 140–133 (OT)				Arizona Veterans Memorial Coliseum	13–16
30	December 28, 1983	Golden State	W 128–105				Arizona Veterans Memorial Coliseum	14–16
31	December 30, 1983	Houston	W 121–110				Arizona Veterans Memorial Coliseum	15–16

January: 4–8 (home: 4–0; road: 0–8)

Game	Date	Team	Score	High points	High rebounds	High assists	Location Attendance	Record
32	January 3, 1984	@ Chicago	L 97–102				Chicago Stadium	15–17
33	January 4, 1984	@ Detroit	L 114–128				Pontiac Silverdome	15–18
34	January 6, 1984	@ Indiana	L 88–104				Market Square Arena	15–19
35	January 7, 1984	@ Kansas City	L 98–100				Kemper Arena	15–20
36	January 10, 1984	@ Utah	L 98–107				Salt Palace Acord Arena	15–21
37	January 11, 1984	San Diego	W 129–104				Arizona Veterans Memorial Coliseum	16–21
38	January 13, 1984	@ Seattle	L 99–103				Kingdome	16–22
39	January 15, 1984	Washington	W 110–101				Arizona Veterans Memorial Coliseum	17–22
40	January 19, 1984	Los Angeles	W 138–123				Arizona Veterans Memorial Coliseum	18–22
41	January 21, 1984	Seattle	W 131–102				Arizona Veterans Memorial Coliseum	19–22
42	January 24, 1984	@ Los Angeles	L 110–116				The Forum	19–23
43	January 26, 1984	@ San Diego	L 101–119				San Diego Sports Arena	19–24
All-Star Break

February: 8–9 (home: 5–2; road: 3–7)

Game	Date	Team	Score	High points	High rebounds	High assists	Location Attendance	Record
44	February 1, 1984	Portland	W 109–106				Arizona Veterans Memorial Coliseum	20–24
45	February 2, 1984	@ Utah	L 95–116				Salt Palace Acord Arena	20–25
46	February 4, 1984	@ Golden State	L 104–107				Oakland–Alameda County Coliseum Arena	20–26
47	February 5, 1984	@ Portland	L 82–97				Memorial Coliseum	20–27
48	February 7, 1984	San Antonio	W 138–131				Arizona Veterans Memorial Coliseum	21–27
49	February 9, 1984	Atlanta	W 118–105				Arizona Veterans Memorial Coliseum	22–27
50	February 11, 1984	Dallas	W 108–89				Arizona Veterans Memorial Coliseum	23–27
51	February 14, 1984	@ Milwaukee	L 83–92				MECCA Arena	23–28
52	February 15, 1984	@ Cleveland	L 90–104				Richfield Coliseum	23–29
53	February 17, 1984	@ Dallas	L 123–129				Reunion Arena	23–30
54	February 18, 1984	@ Houston	W 126–102				The Summit	24–30
55	February 21, 1984	@ San Antonio	W 114–111 (OT)				HemisFair Arena	25–30
56	February 23, 1984	@ Kansas City	W 107–95				Kemper Arena	26–30
57	February 24, 1984	Denver	L 100–117				Arizona Veterans Memorial Coliseum	26–31
58	February 26, 1984	Boston	L 109–116				Arizona Veterans Memorial Coliseum	26–32
59	February 28, 1984	Utah	W 113–100				Arizona Veterans Memorial Coliseum	27–32
60	February 29, 1984	@ San Diego	L 95–102				San Diego Sports Arena	27–33

March: 8–8 (home: 7–2; road: 1–6)

Game	Date	Team	Score	High points	High rebounds	High assists	Location Attendance	Record
61	March 1, 1984	Philadelphia	W 112–100				Arizona Veterans Memorial Coliseum	28–33
62	March 3, 1984	San Antonio	W 120–106				Arizona Veterans Memorial Coliseum	29–33
63	March 7, 1984	Houston	W 123–110				Arizona Veterans Memorial Coliseum	30–33
64	March 9, 1984	Indiana	W 130–110				Arizona Veterans Memorial Coliseum	31–33
65	March 11, 1984	@ Boston	L 109–117				Boston Garden	31–34
66	March 13, 1984	@ New York	L 96–117				Madison Square Garden	31–35
67	March 14, 1984	@ New Jersey	L 102–108				Brendan Byrne Arena	31–36
68	March 16, 1984	@ Washington	W 110–109 (OT)				Capital Centre	32–36
69	March 17, 1984	@ Philadelphia	L 112–131				The Spectrum	32–37
70	March 20, 1984	Denver	W 146–120				Arizona Veterans Memorial Coliseum	33–37
71	March 21, 1984	@ Seattle	L 102–104				Kingdome	33–38
72	March 23, 1984	@ Portland	L 98–124				Memorial Coliseum	33–39
73	March 24, 1984	Detroit	L 109–120				Arizona Veterans Memorial Coliseum	33–40
74	March 27, 1984	San Diego	W 116–109				Arizona Veterans Memorial Coliseum	34–40
75	March 29, 1984	Golden State	W 124–119 (OT)				Arizona Veterans Memorial Coliseum	35–40
76	March 31, 1984	Los Angeles	L 97–119				Arizona Veterans Memorial Coliseum	35–41

April: 6–0 (home: 4–0; road: 2–0)

Game	Date	Team	Score	High points	High rebounds	High assists	Location Attendance	Record
77	April 3, 1984	Kansas City	W 113–109				Arizona Veterans Memorial Coliseum	36–41
78	April 6, 1984	Seattle	W 117–108				Arizona Veterans Memorial Coliseum	37–41
79	April 8, 1984	@ Denver	W 146–120				McNichols Sports Arena	38–41
80	April 10, 1984	Portland	W 100–88				Arizona Veterans Memorial Coliseum	39–41
81	April 12, 1984	Dallas	W 119–118				Arizona Veterans Memorial Coliseum	40–41
82	April 15, 1984	@ Los Angeles	W 123–114				The Forum	41–41

1983–84 schedule

=== Playoffs ===
1984 playoff game log
Western Conference First Round: 3–2 (home: 1–1; road: 2–1)

Game	Date	Team	Score	High points	High rebounds	High assists	Location Attendance	Series
1	April 18, 1984	@ Portland	W 113–106	Edwards (23)	Nance (9)	Davis (13)	Memorial Coliseum; 12,666	1–0
2	April 20, 1984	@ Portland	L 116–122	Davis (25)	Davis, Lucas (5)	Adams (5)	Memorial Coliseum; 12,666	1–1
3	April 22, 1984	Portland	W 106–103	Davis (27)	Lucas, Nance (10)	Davis (10)	Arizona Veterans Memorial Coliseum; 11,531	2–1
4	April 24, 1984	Portland	L 110–113	Davis (29)	Lucas (10)	Davis, Macy (7)	Arizona Veterans Memorial Coliseum; 14,660	2–2
5	April 26, 1984	@ Portland	W 117–105	Davis (29)	Lucas (12)	Davis (10)	Memorial Coliseum; 12,666	3–2

Western Conference Semifinals: 4–2 (home: 3–0; road: 1–2)

Game	Date	Team	Score	High points	High rebounds	High assists	Location Attendance	Series
1	April 29, 1984	@ Utah	L 95–105	Davis (21)	Edwards (8)	Davis (7)	Salt Palace Acord Arena; 12,403	0–1
2	May 2, 1984	@ Utah	W 102–97	Davis (28)	Lucas (15)	Macy (7)	Salt Palace Acord; 12,689	1–1
3	May 4, 1984	Utah	W 106–94	Davis (30)	Lucas (14)	Macy (7)	Arizona Veterans Memorial Coliseum; 14,660	2–1
4	May 6, 1984	Utah	W 111–110 (OT)	Davis (32)	Adams (15)	Lucas (6)	Arizona Veterans Memorial Coliseum; 14,660	3–1
5	May 8, 1984	@ Utah	L 106–118	Lucas (19)	Lucas (12)	Macy, Westphal (6)	Salt Palace Acord Arena; 12,560	3–2
6	May 10, 1984	Utah	W 102–82	Davis (21)	Nance (9)	Davis, Macy (6)	Arizona Veterans Memorial Coliseum; 14,660	4–2

Western Conference Finals: 2–4 (home: 1–2; road: 1–2)

Game	Date	Team	Score	High points	High rebounds	High assists	Location Attendance	Series
1	May 12, 1984	@ Los Angeles	L 94–110	Davis (24)	Nance (15)	Macy (10)	The Forum; 12,825	0–1
2	May 15, 1984	@ Los Angeles	L 102–118	Nance (29)	Nance (9)	Davis (8)	The Forum; 16,578	0–2
3	May 18, 1984	Los Angeles	W 135–127 (OT)	Davis (34)	Lucas (17)	Macy (6)	Arizona Veterans Memorial Coliseum; 14,660	1–2
4	May 20, 1984	Los Angeles	L 115–126	Nance (27)	Lucas (10)	Davis (7)	Arizona Veterans Memorial Coliseum; 14,660	1–3
5	May 23, 1984	@ Los Angeles	W 126–121	Davis (27)	Nance (13)	Macy (12)	The Forum; 16,848	2–3
6	May 25, 1984	Los Angeles	L 97–99	Davis (26)	Lucas (13)	Macy (8)	Arizona Veterans Memorial Coliseum; 14,660	2–4

1984 schedule

== Awards and honors ==
=== All-Star ===
- Walter Davis was selected as a reserve for the Western Conference in the 1984 NBA All-Star Game. It was his fifth All-Star selection.
- Larry Nance competed in the inaugural NBA Slam Dunk Contest. Nance became the league's first Dunk champion, defeating Julius Erving in the final round.
- The other Suns player receiving All-Star votes was Maurice Lucas (302,258).

== Player statistics ==
Legend
GP	Games played	GS	Games started	MPG	Minutes per game
FG%	Field-goal percentage	3P%	3-point field-goal percentage	FT%	Free-throw percentage
RPG	Rebounds per game	APG	Assists per game	SPG	Steals per game
BPG	Blocks per game	PPG	Points per game

=== Season ===
Phoenix Suns statistics
Player	GP	GS	MPG	FG%	3P%	FT%	RPG	APG	SPG	BPG	PPG
Alvan Adams	70	13	20.7	.462	.000	.825	4.6	3.1	1.0	.4	9.6
Walter Davis	78	70	32.6	.512	.230	.863	2.6	5.5	1.4	.2	20.0
James Edwards	72	67	26.3	.536	.000	.720	4.8	2.6	.3	.4	14.7
Rod Foster	80	34	17.8	.448	.262	.787	1.5	2.2	.7	.1	8.3
Johnny High	29	9	17.7	.346	.000	.345	2.3	1.8	1.4	.4	1.6
Maurice Lucas	75	69	30.8	.497	.000	.765	9.7	2.7	.7	.5	15.9
Kyle Macy	82	45	29.3	.501	.329	.833	2.3	4.3	1.5	.1	10.1
Larry Nance	82	82	35.4	.576†	.000	.707	8.3	2.6	1.0	2.1	17.7
Charles Pittman	69	8	14.3	.603†	.000	.683	3.1	1.0	.2	.3	4.7
Rick Robey	61	4	14.0	.545	1.000	.693	3.2	1.1	.3	.2	5.6
Mike Sanders	50	0	11.7	.478	.	.690	2.1	0.9	.5	.2	4.5
Alvin Scott	65	5	11.3	.444	.500	.778	1.5	0.7	.3	.3	2.6
Paul Westphal	59	2	14.7	.460	.269	.824	0.7	2.5	.7	.1	7.0
Rory White*	22	2	14.0	.479	.	.571	2.8	0.6	.6	.1	7.4

* – Stats with the Suns.
† – Minimum 300 field goals made.

=== Playoffs ===
Phoenix Suns statistics
Player	GP	GS	MPG	FG%	3P%	FT%	RPG	APG	SPG	BPG	PPG
Alvan Adams	17	0	18.4	.421	.	.679	5.1	2.5	1.0	.6	8.4
Walter Davis	17	17	36.6	.535	.273	.897	2.7	6.4	1.7	.2	24.9
James Edwards	17	17	27.2	.492	.	.706	5.4	1.6	.2	.6	13.8
Rod Foster	16	0	8.0	.256	.000	1.000^	0.8	1.1	.3	.1	1.8
Maurice Lucas	17	16	33.5	.511	.	.808	9.9	3.6	.7	.5	17.4
Kyle Macy	17	15	36.5	.490	.455†	.750	3.2	5.8	1.3	.1	10.4
Larry Nance	17	17	37.2	.590	.	.671	8.7	2.4	.9	2.0	16.9
Charles Pittman	17	1	14.9	.549	.000	.621	3.8	0.7	.3	.3	4.4
Rick Robey	10	0	4.3	.438	.000	.500	1.0	0.2	.2	.0	1.8
Mike Sanders	15	0	10.1	.478	.	.941^	1.3	0.5	.4	.3	4.0
Alvin Scott	16	0	6.9	.385	1.000†	.667	1.5	0.4	.1	.1	1.6
Paul Westphal	17	2	13.1	.375	.222	.875	0.5	2.2	.7	.0	5.3

† – Minimum 5 three-pointers made.
^ – Minimum 10 free throws made.

== Transactions ==
=== Trades ===
June 27, 1983	To Boston Celtics (United States) Dennis Johnson 1983 first-round draft pick ( (United States) Greg Kite) 1983 third-round draft pick ( (United States) Winfred King)	To Phoenix Suns (United States) Rick Robey 1983 second-round draft pick ( (United States) Rod Foster) 1983 second-round draft pick ( (United States) Paul Williams)
October 17, 1983	To Detroit Pistons (United States) David Thirdkill	To Phoenix Suns 1986 second-round draft pick ( (United States) Jeff Hornacek) 1987 second-round draft pick ( (United States) Bruce Dalrymple)

=== Free agents ===
==== Additions ====
Date	Player	Contract	Old Team
June 16, 1983	Kevin Magee	Undisclosed	Pallacanestro Varese (Italy)
September 14, 1983	Paul Westphal	Signed 2-year contract	New York Knicks
December 10, 1983	Mike Sanders	Signed 3-year contract	San Antonio Spurs
January 11, 1984	Johnny High	Signed two 10-day contracts	Phoenix Suns

==== Subtractions ====
Date	Player	Reason left	New team
September 12, 1983	Joel Kramer	Free agent	Maccabi Tel Aviv (Israel)
October 18, 1983	Kevin Magee	Waived	CB Zaragoza (Spain)
December 10, 1983	Johnny High	Waived	Phoenix Suns
December 20, 1983	Rory White	Waived	Wyoming Wildcatters (CBA)
January 31, 1984	Johnny High	Waived	Wyoming Wildcatters (CBA)
