= Darnell Valentine =

American basketball player (born 1959)

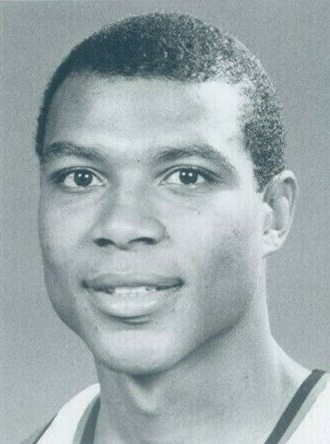

Personal information
- Born: February 3, 1959 (age 67) Chicago, Illinois, U.S.
- Listed height: 6 ft 2 in (1.88 m)
- Listed weight: 183 lb (83 kg)

Career information
- High school: Wichita Heights (Wichita, Kansas)
- College: Kansas (1977–1981)
- NBA draft: 1981: 1st round, 16th overall pick
- Drafted by: Portland Trail Blazers
- Playing career: 1981–1994
- Position: Point guard
- Number: 10, 14, 1

Career history
- 1981–1986: Portland Trail Blazers
- 1986–1988: Los Angeles Clippers
- 1988–1991: Cleveland Cavaliers
- 1991–1992: Marr Rimini
- 1992–1993: Burghy Modena
- 1994: Reggio Emilia

Career highlights
- Second-team All-American – AP (1981); 4× First-team All-Big Eight (1978–1981); No. 14 jersey retired by Kansas Jayhawks; First-team Parade All-American (1977); McDonald's All-American (1977)

Career NBA statistics
- Points: 5,400 (8.7 ppg)
- Rebounds: 1,318 (2.1 rpg)
- Assists: 3,080 (5.0 apg)
- Stats at NBA.com
- Stats at Basketball Reference

Darnell Terrell Valentine (born February 3, 1959) is an American former professional basketball player who played ten seasons in the National Basketball Association (NBA).

== Early life ==
Valentine was born in Chicago, Illinois and graduated from Wichita Heights High School in Wichita, Kansas, in 1977. He was named to the inaugural McDonald's All-American team, which played in the 1977 Capital Classic.

== College ==
He played college basketball at the University of Kansas where he was a three-time Academic All-American and was a member of the 1980 Summer Olympics men's basketball team. The team was unable to compete due to the 1980 Summer Olympics boycott. He did however receive one of 461 Congressional Gold Medals created especially for the spurned athletes.

== Professional ==
Selected by the Portland Trail Blazers in the first round (16th pick overall) of the 1981 NBA draft, Valentine spent 4 1/2 years with the Trail Blazers. In 300 regular season games with Portland, he averaged 9.8 points, 2.3 rebounds and 5.4 assists a game. Valentine also played for the Los Angeles Clippers and the Cleveland Cavaliers during his 10-year NBA career. He owns career averages of 8.7 points, 2.1 rebounds and 5.0 assists in 620 NBA games. After winding up his NBA career, Valentine played three seasons in the Italian Basketball League.

From 1994 to 2004 Valentine served as a Regional Representative for the National Basketball Players Association. Valentine worked for the Portland Trail Blazers as Director of Player Programs from September 2004 to December 2007. He currently works for Precision Castparts Corp. in Portland.

== Career statistics ==
Legend
GP	Games played	GS	Games started	MPG	Minutes per game
FG%	Field goal percentage	3P%	3-point field goal percentage	FT%	Free throw percentage
RPG	Rebounds per game	APG	Assists per game	SPG	Steals per game
BPG	Blocks per game	PPG	Points per game	**Bold**	Career high

=== NBA ===
==== Regular season ====
Year	Team	GP	GS	MPG	FG%	3P%	FT%	RPG	APG	SPG	BPG	PPG
1981–82	Portland	**82**	14	16.9	.413	.000	.760	1.8	3.3	1.1	.0	6.4
1982–83	Portland	47	36	27.6	.454	.000	.793	2.5	6.2	**2.1**	.1	**12.5**
1983–84	Portland	68	**60**	27.8	.447	.000	.789	1.9	5.8	1.6	.1	10.2
1984–85	Portland	75	59	**30.4**	**.473**	.000	.793	**2.9**	**7.0**	1.9	.1	11.6
1985–86	Portland	28	27	26.2	.447	.333	.710	2.6	5.0	1.8	.0	9.1
1985–86	L.A. Clippers	34	2	14.2	.379	.273	.787	1.6	3.1	.7	.0	5.9
1986–87	L.A. Clippers	65	52	27.1	.410	.232	.815	2.3	6.9	1.8	**.2**	11.2
1987–88	L.A. Clippers	79	31	20.7	.418	**.455**	.743	2.0	4.8	1.5	.1	7.1
1988–89	Cleveland	77	4	14.1	.426	.214	.813	1.3	2.3	.7	.1	4.8
1990–91	Cleveland	65	**60**	28.3	.464	.240	**.831**	2.6	5.4	1.5	**.2**	9.4
Career		620	345	23.2	.437	.261	.787	2.1	5.0	1.5	.1	8.7

==== Playoffs ====
Year	Team	GP	GS	MPG	FG%	3P%	FT%	RPG	APG	SPG	BPG	PPG
1983	Portland	7		29.3	.425	**.500**	.762	2.1	**8.7**	1.4	**.4**	12.1
1984	Portland	5		**35.6**	**.500**	–	.914	**2.2**	8.4	**1.8**	.2	**18.4**
1985	Portland	**9**	**9**	27.1	.489	–	**.935**	1.9	6.4	**1.8**	.0	12.8
1989	Cleveland	5	0	16.0	.350	–	.875	1.4	3.2	1.0	.0	4.2
Career		26	9	27.2	.460	.500	.884	1.9	6.8	1.5	.2	12.0
