= 1983–84 Golden State Warriors season =

NBA professional basketball team season

- Head coach: Johnny Bach
- Arena: Oakland-Alameda County Coliseum Arena

Results
- Record: 37–45 (.451)
- Place: Division: 5th (Pacific); Conference: 10th (Western)
- Playoff finish: Did not qualify
- Stats at Basketball Reference

The 1983–84 Golden State Warriors season was the Warriors' 38th season in the NBA and 21st in the San Francisco Bay Area.

== Draft picks ==
Round	Pick	Player	Position	Nationality	College
1	6	Russell Cross	C	United States	Purdue
2	43	Pace Mannion	SG	United States	Utah
3	53	Mike Holton	PG	United States	UCLA
4	77	Peter Thibeaux		United States	St. Mary's (CA)
5	99	Greg Hines		United States	Hampton
6	123	Tom Heywood		United States	Weber State
7	145	Peter Williams		United States	Utah
8	169	Doug Harris		United States	Central Washington
9	190	Greg Goorjiam		United States	Loyola Marymount
10	212	Michael Zeno		United States	California State-Long Beach

== Roster ==
Golden State Warriors roster
Players

Pos.	No.	Player	Height	Weight	DOB	From
G	23	Mike Bratz	6 ft 2 in (1.88 m)	185 lb (84 kg)		Stanford
C	2	Joe Barry Carroll	7 ft 0 in (2.13 m)	225 lb (102 kg)		Purdue
G/F	18	Don Collins	6 ft 6 in (1.98 m)	190 lb (86 kg)		Washington State
G	32	Lester Conner	6 ft 4 in (1.93 m)	180 lb (82 kg)		Oregon State
C	40	Russell Cross	6 ft 10 in (2.08 m)	215 lb (98 kg)		Purdue
C	55	Chris Engler	6 ft 11 in (2.11 m)	245 lb (111 kg)		Wyoming
G	21	Sleepy Floyd	6 ft 3 in (1.91 m)	170 lb (77 kg)		Georgetown
F	43	Mickey Johnson	6 ft 10 in (2.08 m)	190 lb (86 kg)		Aurora
F	20	Pace Mannion	6 ft 7 in (2.01 m)	190 lb (86 kg)		Utah
G/F	45	Purvis Short	6 ft 7 in (2.01 m)	210 lb (95 kg)		Jackson State
F	13	Larry Smith	6 ft 8 in (2.03 m)	215 lb (98 kg)		Alcorn State
C	22	Darren Tillis	6 ft 11 in (2.11 m)	215 lb (98 kg)		Cleveland State

Coaches
Head coach
- Johnny Bach (Fordham)
Assistant(s)
- Bob Zuffelato (Central Connecticut State)

Legend
- (DP) Unsigned draft pick
- (FA) Free agent
- (S) Suspended
- Injured

== Regular season ==
=== Season standings ===
Pacific Division	W	L	PCT	GB	Home	Road	Div
y-Los Angeles Lakers	54	28	.659	–	28–13	26–15	18–12
x-Portland Trail Blazers	48	34	.585	6	33–8	15–26	17–13
x-Seattle SuperSonics	42	40	.512	12	32–9	10–31	14–16
x-Phoenix Suns	41	41	.500	13	31–10	10–31	16–14
Golden State Warriors	37	45	.451	17	27–14	10–31	13–17
San Diego Clippers	30	52	.366	24	25–16	5–36	12–18

#	Western Conference				
#	Team	W	L	PCT	GB
1	c-Los Angeles Lakers	54	28	.659	–
2	y-Utah Jazz	45	37	.549	9
3	x-Portland Trail Blazers	48	34	.585	6
4	x-Dallas Mavericks	43	39	.524	11
5	x-Seattle SuperSonics	42	40	.512	12
6	x-Phoenix Suns	41	41	.500	13
7	x-Denver Nuggets	38	44	.463	16
8	x-Kansas City Kings	38	44	.463	16
9	San Antonio Spurs	37	45	.451	17
10	Golden State Warriors	37	45	.451	17
11	San Diego Clippers	30	52	.366	24
12	Houston Rockets	29	53	.354	25

z - clinched division title
y - clinched division title
x - clinched playoff spot

== Game log ==
=== Regular season ===
1983–84 game log
Total: 37–45 (Home: 27–14; Road: 10–31)
October: 2–0 (home: 1–0; road: 1–0)

Game	Date	Team	Score	High points	High rebounds	High assists	Location Attendance	Record
1	October 28	@ Seattle						
2	October 29	Portland						

November: 6–9 (home: 4–3; road: 2–6)

Game	Date	Team	Score	High points	High rebounds	High assists	Location Attendance	Record
3	November 1	@ Kansas City						
4	November 3	@ Utah						
5	November 5	New York						
6	November 8	Atlanta						
7	November 10	Phoenix						
8	November 12	Cleveland						
9	November 13	@ Phoenix						
10	November 15	San Antonio						
11	November 17	Denver						
12	November 19	@ Houston						
13	November 22	@ Washington						
14	November 23	@ Milwaukee						
15	November 25	@ Indiana						
16	November 26	@ Dallas						
17	November 29	Los Angeles						

December: 7–9 (home: 6–4; road: 1–5)

Game	Date	Team	Score	High points	High rebounds	High assists	Location Attendance	Record
18	December 1	Kansas City						
19	December 2	@ San Diego						
20	December 6	Seattle						
21	December 8	Detroit						
22	December 10	Dallas						
23	December 11	@ Portland						
24	December 13	New Jersey						
25	December 15	Kansas City						
26	December 17	@ Utah						
27	December 18	San Diego						
28	December 20	Phoenix						
29	December 22	Los Angeles						
30	December 23	@ Los Angeles						
31	December 27	Utah						
32	December 28	@ Phoenix						
33	December 30	@ Los Angeles						

January: 5–8 (home: 4–1; road: 1–7)

Game	Date	Team	Score	High points	High rebounds	High assists	Location Attendance	Record
34	January 3	Philadelphia						
35	January 7	San Antonio						
36	January 10	@ Atlanta						
37	January 11	@ Boston						
38	January 13	@ New Jersey						
39	January 14	@ Philadelphia						
40	January 17	San Diego						
41	January 19	Portland						
42	January 21	@ Denver						
43	January 24	@ Houston						
44	January 25	@ Dallas						
45	January 26	@ San Antonio						
46	January 31	Milwaukee						

February: 7–6 (home: 6–2; road: 1–4)

Game	Date	Team	Score	High points	High rebounds	High assists	Location Attendance	Record
47	February 2	San Antonio						
48	February 4	Phoenix						
49	February 6	@ New York						
50	February 8	@ Cleveland						
51	February 10	@ Detroit						
52	February 11	@ Chicago						
53	February 14	Seattle						
54	February 16	Boston						
55	February 18	Washington						
56	February 21	Denver						
57	February 23	San Diego						
58	February 25	@ Houston						
59	February 28	Denver						

March: 5–10 (home: 2–4; road: 3–6)

Game	Date	Team	Score	High points	High rebounds	High assists	Location Attendance	Record
60	March 2	@ San Diego						
61	March 3	Houston						
62	March 6	Indiana						
63	March 10	@ Dallas						
64	March 11	@ Kansas City						
65	March 13	Chicago						
66	March 15	Utah						
67	March 17	@ Portland						
68	March 18	@ Seattle						
69	March 20	Seattle						
70	March 23	@ Utah (at Las Vegas, Nevada)						
71	March 24	Portland						
72	March 27	@ San Antonio						
73	March 29	@ Phoenix						
74	March 30	@ San Diego						

April: 5–3 (home: 4–0; road: 1–3)

Game	Date	Team	Score	High points	High rebounds	High assists	Location Attendance	Record
75	April 1	@ Los Angeles						
76	April 3	Houston						
77	April 5	@ Denver						
78	April 7	Kansas City						
79	April 10	Los Angeles						
80	April 12	@ Seattle						
81	April 13	@ Portland						
82	April 15	Dallas						

1983–84 schedule

== See also ==
- 1983-84 NBA season
