= 1983–84 Dallas Mavericks season =

NBA professional basketball team season

- Head coach: Dick Motta
- General manager: Norm Sonju
- Owner: Don Carter
- Arena: Reunion Arena

Results
- Record: 43–39 (.524)
- Place: Division: 2nd (Midwest); Conference: 4th (Western)
- Playoff finish: Conference semifinals (lost to Lakers 1–4)
- Stats at Basketball Reference

The 1983–84 Dallas Mavericks season was the Mavericks' 4th season in the NBA.

The season is notable seeing the Mavericks make the postseason for the first time in franchise history. However, after defeating the Seattle SuperSonics in the opening round, Dallas was outmatched by an experienced Los Angeles Lakers squad as they fell in five games.

Mark Aguirre was selected to play in the 1984 NBA All-Star Game. He is the first player in Mavericks history to be named an All-Star.

== Draft picks ==
Round	Pick	Player	Position	Nationality	College
1	9	Dale Ellis	SG/SF	United States	Tennessee
1	11	Derek Harper	PG	United States	Illinois
2	30	Mark West	C	United States	Old Dominion
2	33	Dirk Minniefield	PG	United States	Kentucky
4	79	Johnny Martin		United States	Northwestern State
5	102	Jim Lampley		United States	Arkansas-Little Rock
6	125	Billy Allen		United States	Nevada-Reno
7	148	Terrell Schlundt		United States	Marquette
8	171	Bill Sadler		United States	Pepperdine
9	193	Sherrod Arnold		United States	Chicago State
10	214	Clyde Corley		United States	Florida International

== Roster ==
1983–84 Dallas Mavericks roster
Players

Pos.	No.	Player	Height	Weight	DOB	From
SF	24	Mark Aguirre	6 ft 6 in (1.98 m)	232 lb (105 kg)	1959–12–10	DePaul
SG	22	Rolando Blackman	6 ft 6 in (1.98 m)	190 lb (86 kg)	1959–02–26	Kansas State
PF	42	Pat Cummings	6 ft 9 in (2.06 m)	230 lb (104 kg)	1956–07–11	Cincinnati
PG	15	Brad Davis	6 ft 3 in (1.91 m)	180 lb (82 kg)	1955–12–17	Maryland
SF	14	Dale Ellis	6 ft 7 in (2.01 m)	205 lb (93 kg)	1960–08–06	Tennessee
PF	20	Bill Garnett	6 ft 9 in (2.06 m)	225 lb (102 kg)	1960–04–22	Wyoming
PG	12	Derek Harper	6 ft 4 in (1.93 m)	185 lb (84 kg)	1961–10–13	Illinois
C	40	Kurt Nimphius	6 ft 10 in (2.08 m)	218 lb (99 kg)	1958–03–13	Arizona State
SG	34	Jim Spanarkel	6 ft 5 in (1.96 m)	190 lb (86 kg)	1957–06–28	Duke
SF	33	Elston Turner	6 ft 5 in (1.96 m)	190 lb (86 kg)	1959–06–10	Mississippi
SF	31	Jay Vincent	6 ft 7 in (2.01 m)	220 lb (100 kg)	1959–06–10	Michigan State
C	45	Mark West	6 ft 10 in (2.08 m)	230 lb (104 kg)	1960–11–05	Old Dominion

Coaches
Head coach
- Dick Motta
Assistant(s)
- Bob Weiss

Legend
- (DP) Unsigned draft pick
- (FA) Free agent
- (S) Suspended
- Injured

Roster
Updated: February 20, 1984

== Regular season ==
The Mavericks started the season 11–0 at home.

=== Season standings ===
Midwest Division	W	L	PCT	GB	Home	Road	Div
y-Utah Jazz	45	37	.549	–	31–10	14–27	15–15
x-Dallas Mavericks	43	39	.524	2	31–10	12–29	19–11
x-Denver Nuggets	38	44	.463	7	27–14	11–30	16–14
x-Kansas City Kings	38	44	.463	7	26–15	12–29	16–14
San Antonio Spurs	37	45	.451	8	28–13	9–32	14–16
Houston Rockets	29	53	.354	16	21–20	8–33	9–21

#	Western Conference				
#	Team	W	L	PCT	GB
1	c-Los Angeles Lakers	54	28	.659	–
2	y-Utah Jazz	45	37	.549	9
3	x-Portland Trail Blazers	48	34	.585	6
4	x-Dallas Mavericks	43	39	.524	11
5	x-Seattle SuperSonics	42	40	.512	12
6	x-Phoenix Suns	41	41	.500	13
7	x-Denver Nuggets	38	44	.463	16
8	x-Kansas City Kings	38	44	.463	16
9	San Antonio Spurs	37	45	.451	17
10	Golden State Warriors	37	45	.451	17
11	San Diego Clippers	30	52	.366	24
12	Houston Rockets	29	53	.354	25

z – clinched division title
y – clinched division title
x – clinched playoff spot

=== Game log ===
1983–84 game log
Total: 43–39 (home: 31–10; road: 12–29)
October: 1–1 (home: 1–0; road: 0–1)

Game	Date	Team	Score	High points	High rebounds	High assists	Location Attendance	Record
1	October 29; 7:35 p.m. CDT	Phoenix	W 120–103	Blackman (27)	Aguirre (9)	Aguirre (8)	Reunion Arena; 11,019	1–0
2	October 30; 7:00 p.m. CST	@ San Antonio	L 101–123	Ellis (16)	Aguirre, Nimphius (8)	Brad Davis	HemisFair Arena; 8,219	1–1

November: 10–3 (home: 9–0; road: 1–3)

Game	Date	Team	Score	High points	High rebounds	High assists	Location Attendance	Record
3	November 1; 8:40 p.m. CST	@ Denver	W 130–124	Aguirre (39)	Cummings (12)	Davis (9)	McNichols Sports Arena; 7,864	2–1
4	November 2; 7:35 p.m. CST	Portland	W 123–117	Aguirre (28)	Aguirre (11)	Garnett (11)	Reunion Arena; 9,197	3–1
5	November 4; 7:05 p.m. CST	@ Cleveland	L 84–105	Aguirre (20)	Ellis (10)	Harper (5)	Richfeld Coliseum; 3,426	3–2
6	November 5; 7:35 p.m. CST	Los Angeles	W 107–102	Aguirre (33)	Aguirre (11)	Aguirre (9)	Reunion Arena; 17,007	4–2
7	November 9; 9:30 p.m. CST	@ Los Angeles	L 106–120	Blackman (24)	Ellis (12)	Davis (8)	The Forum; 14,341	4–3
8	November 11; 7:35 p.m. CST	San Antonio	W 112–105	Aguirre (32)	Aguirre (8)	Davis (9)	Reunion Arena; 13,010	5–3
9	November 12; 7:40 p.m. CST	@ Houston	L 98–100	Aguirre (31)	Garnett (9)	Davis (5)	The Summit; 13,059	5–4
10	November 17; 7:35 p.m. CST	New Jersey	W 115–113	Aguirre (30)	Cummings (14)	Davis (9)	Reunion Arena; 10,170	6–4
11	November 19; 7:35 p.m. CST	Phoenix	W 116–107	Cummings (25)	Ellis (11)	Davis (8)	Reunion Arena; 14,710	7–4
12	November 22; 7:35 p.m. CST	San Antonio	W 118–117	Aguirre (32)	Aguirre, Cummings (9)	Aguirre, Davis (8)	Reunion Arena; 11,220	8–4
13	November 25; 7:35 p.m. CST	Kansas City	W 98–96	Aguirre (28)	Blackman (10)	Davis (11)	Reunion Arena; 13,873	9–4
14	November 26; 7:35 p.m. CST	Golden State	W 115–109	Aguirre (26)	Cummings (9)	Davis (10)	Reunion Arena; 12,190	10–4
15	November 30; 7:35 p.m. CST	Houston	W 113–102	Aguirre (39)	Blackman (11)	Aguirre (7)	Reunion Arena; 16,538	11–4

December: 5–10 (home: 3–2; road: 2–8)

Game	Date	Team	Score	High points	High rebounds	High assists	Location Attendance	Record
16	December 2; 9:30 p.m. CST	@ Los Angeles	W 133–118	Aguirre (42)	Cummings (11)	Davis (7)	The Forum; 16,044	12–4
17	December 3; 7:35 p.m. CST	Chicago	W 110–100	Aguirre (32)	Aguirre, Nimphius (7)	Blackman, Davis (6)	Reunion Arena; 15,201	13–4
18	December 6; 7:35 p.m. CST	@ Kansas City	L 103–112	Aguirre (38)	Aguirre (11)	Davis (6)	Kemper Arena; 6,033	13–5
19	December 7; 7:35 p.m. CST	Washington	L 112–114	Aguiirre (30)	Garnett (8)	Davis (9)	Reunion Arena; 10,663	13–6
20	December 9; 10:00 p.m. CST	@ Seattle	L 124–132	Aguirre (29)	Blackman (8)	Davis (10)	Kingdome; 9,114	13–7
21	December 10; 10:05 p.m. CST	@ Golden State	W 126–123 (OT)	Aguirre (40)	Aguirre, Blackman (9)	Davis (10)	Oakland–Alameda County Coliseum Arena; 8,281	14–7
22	December 11; 7:05 p.m. CST	@ San Diego	L 116–118	Aguirre (40)	Cummings (12)	Davis (7)	San Diego Sports Arena; 3,152	15–7
23	December 14; 7:35 p.m. CST	Indiana	W 117–109	Aguirre (30)	Cummings (11)	Davis (9)	Reunion Arena; 10,239	15–8
24	December 16; 8:00 p.m. CST	@ Milwaukee	L 105–110	Aguirre (30)	Aguirre (11)	Davis (7)	MECCA Arena; 9,876	15–9
25	December 17; 7:35 p.m. CST	@ Chicago	L 84–102	Aguirre (20)	West (6)	Aguirre (5)	Chicago Stadium; 8,912	15–10
26	December 20; 6:35 p.m. CST	@ Detroit	L 104–116	Aguirre (34)	Aguirre, Ellis (6)	Davis (10)	Pontiac Silverdome; 7,553	15–11
27	December 22; 7:00 p.m. CST	@ New Jersey	L 98–101	Aguirre (35)	Cummings (9)	Davis (9)	Brendan Byrne Arena; 10,563	15–12
28	December 27; 6:40 p.m. CST	@ Atlanta	L 109–112	Aguirre (32)	Cummings, Nimphius (9)	Aguirre, Blackman, Davis (6)	The Omni; 6,159	15–13
29	December 28; 7:35 p.m. CST	San Diego	W 109–92	Aguirre (31)	Nimphius (12)	Davis (9)	Reunion Arena; 12,464	16–13
30	December 30; 7:35 p.m. CST	Boston	L 109–114 (OT)	Blackman (34)	Cummings (11)	Aguirre, Davis (5)	Reunion Arena; 17,007	16–14

January: 9–5 (home: 5–1; road: 4–4)

Game	Date	Team	Score	High points	High rebounds	High assists	Location Attendance	Record
31	January 3; 7:40 p.m. CST	@ Houston	W 119–117	Aguirre (37)	Aguirre, Cummings (10)	Davis (11)	The Summit; 9,174	17–14
32	January 4; 7:35 p.m. CST	Seattle	W 105–102	Aguirre (29)	Nimphius (9)	Davis (8)	Reunion Arena; 11,315	18–14
33	January 6; 9:35 p.m. CST	@ San Diego	W 123–106	Aguirre (38)	Cummings (10)	Aguirre, Davis (10)	San Diego Sports Arena; 5,402	19–14
34	January 7; 8:40 p.m. CST	@ Denver	L 117–141	Aguirre (31)	Nimphius, Vincent (9)	Davis (10)	McNichols Sports Arena; 11,865	19–15
35	January 10; 7:35 p.m. CST	@ Kansas City	L 102–112	Aguirre (24)	Nimphius (15)	Aguirre (10)	Kemper Arena; 5,608	19–16
36	January 11; 7:35 p.m. CST	Utah	W 117–102	Aguirre (41)	Nimphius (14)	Davis (14)	Reunion Arena; 12,308	20–16
37	January 13; 7:35 p.m. CST	Portland	W 113–110	Blackman (26)	Cummings (18)	Blackman, Davis (7)	Reunion Arena; 17,007	21–16
38	January 15; 2:35 p.m. CST	Denver	W 126–107	Aguirre (25)	Cummings (12)	Davis, Harper (8)	Reunion Arena; 16,039	22–16
39	January 17; 9:35 p.m. CST	@ Portland	L 114–121	Blackman (37)	Nimphius (8)	Nimphius (6)	Memorial Coliseum; 12,666	22–17
40	January 18; 9:30 p.m. CST	@ Seattle (at Tacoma, WA)	L 107–114	Aguirre (25)	Cummings (8)	Aguirre (9)	Tacoma Dome; 13,684	22–18
41	January 20; 7:35 p.m. CST	Utah	L 113–120	Aguirre (33)	Cummings (14)	Blackman (8)	Reunion Arena; 16,918	22–19
42	January 21; 67:35 p.m. CST	@ Indiana	W 118–111	Blackman (32)	Aguirre (10)	Davis (5)	Market Square Arena; 6,844	23–19
43	January 24; 9:35 p.m. CST	@ Utah (at Las Vegas, NV)	W 123–115	Aguirre (32)	Cummings (12)	Blackman (8)	Thomas & Mack Center; 7,752	24–19
44	January 25; 7:35 p.m. CST	Golden State	W 112–110 (OT)	Aguirre (31)	Cummings (10)	Davis (9)	Reunion Arena; 11,774	25–19
All-Star Break

February: 7–9 (home: 4–5; road: 3–4)

Game	Date	Team	Score	High points	High rebounds	High assists	Location Attendance	Record
45	February 1; 7:35 p.m. CST	New York	L 98–105	Aguirre (27)	Nimphius (14)	Davis (9)	Reunion Arena; 14,209	25–20
46	February 2; 7:40 p.m. CST	@ Houston	L 107–123	Blackman (25)	Aguirre, Cummings (6)	Blackman (6)	The Summit; 11,345	25–21
47	February 3; 7:35 p.m. CST	Denver	L 111–114	Aguirre (28)	Cummings (13)	Nimphius (7)	Reunion Arena; 17,007	25–22
48	February 5; 4:30 p.m. CST	@ Seattle	L 96–104	Aguirre (37)	Aguirre, Blackman, Cummings, Nimphius (7)	Davis (10)	Kingdome; 8,483	25–23
49	February 7; 9:35 p.m. CST	@ Portland	L 85–101	Aguirre (42)	Blackman, West (6)	Blackman (4)	Memorial Coliseum; 12,666	25–24
50	February 8; 8:40 p.m. CST	@ Denver	W 120–114	Blackman (27)	Blackman (11)	Aguirre (6)	McNichols Sports Arena; 8,441	26–24
51	February 10; 7:35 p.m. CST	Kansas City	W 115–96	Aguirre (30)	Ellis (10)	Davis, Harper (7)	Reunion Arena; 13,854	27–24
52	February 11; 8:35 p.m. CST	@ Phoenix	L 89–108	Aguirre (27)	Cummings, Garnett (8)	Aguirre (5)	Arizona Veterans Memorial Coliseum; 11,611	27–25
53	February 15; 7:35 p.m. CST	Philadelphia	W 119–116 (2OT)	Aguirre (33)	Cummings, Nimphius (8)	Nimphius (10)	Reunion Arena; 17,007	28–25
54	February 17; 7:35 p.m. CST	Phoenix	W 129–123	Aguirre (42)	Cummings (7)	Davis (9)	Reunion Arena; 12,932	29–25
55	February 18; 7:35 p.m. CST	Detroit	L 115–120	Aguirre (38)	Ellis (10)	Davis (4)	Reunion Arena; 17,007	29–26
56	February 22; 7:35 p.m. CST	Houston	W 112–106	Aguirre (33)	Cummings (11)	Davis (4)	Reunion Arena; 14,319	30–26
57	February 24; 7:35 p.m. CST	Milwaukee	L 88–95	Blackman (27)	Cummings (7)	Aguirre (4)	Reunion Arena; 17,007	30–27
58	February 25; 8:30 p.m. CST	@ Utah	W 97–95	Aguirre (28)	Cummings (8)	Davis (8)	Salt Palace Acord Arena; 12,678	31–27
59	February 28; 7:30 p.m. CST	@ San Antonio	W 116–104	Aguirre (33)	Cummings (14)	Davis (9)	HemisFair Arena; 7,583	32–27
60	February 29; 7:35 p.m. CST	Seattle	L 124–127 (2OT)	Aguirre (39)	Vincent (10)	Davis (10)	Reunion Arena; 13,166	32–28

March: 7–7 (home: 7–1; road: 0–6)

Game	Date	Team	Score	High points	High rebounds	High assists	Location Attendance	Record
61	March 2; 7:35 p.m. CST	Kansas City	W 108–94	Aguirre (28)	Aguirre (8)	Aguirre (8)	Reunion Arena; 13,010	33–28
62	March 3; 7:35 p.m. CST	@ Kansas City	L 103–105	Aguirre (26)	Cummings (8)	Davis, Vincent (4)	Kemper Arena; 9,776	33–29
63	March 7; 7:35 p.m. CST	Cleveland	W 115–103	Blackman (22)	Blackman (6)	Agujirre, Davis (6)	Reunion Arena; 11,558	34–29
64	March 9; 7:35 p.m. CST	Los Angeles	L 120–121 (2OT)	Aguirre (38)	Cummings (13)	Aguirre (7)	Reunion Arena; 17,007	34–30
65	March 10; 7:35 p.m. CST	Golden State	W 120–103	Blackman (43)	Nimphius (12)	Davis (7)	Reunion Arena; 16,436	35–30
66	March 13; 7:30 p.m. CST	@ San Antonio	L 131–137 (2OT)	Aguirre (29)	Aguirre, Cummings (10)	Davis (10)	HemisFair Arena; 8,315	35–31
67	March 14; 7:35 p.m. CST	San Diego	W 105–101	Aguirre (27)	Nimphius (10)	Blackman (4)	Reunion Arena; 13,444	36–31
68	March 17; 8:30 p.m. CST	@ Utah	L 103–118	Blackman (29)	Cummings (11)	Davis, Nimphius (5)	Salt Palace Acord Arena; 12,699	36–32
69	March 21; 7:35 p.m. CST	Atlanta	W 102–101	Blackman (30)	Cummings (9)	Aguirre, Nimphius (5)	Reunion Arena; 17,007	37–32
70	March 23; 7:35 p.m. CST	Houston	W 116–104	Aguirre (28)	Cummings (8)	Davis (8)	Reunion Arena; 17,007	38–32
71	March 24; 7:35 p.m. CST	Denver	W 119–101	Aguirre (46)	Cummings, Ellis (8)	Aguirre, Blackman, Davis, Harper (5)	Reunion Arena; 17,007	39–32
72	March 27; 6:35 p.m. CST	@ New York	L 88–97	Aguirre (27)	Aguirre, Cummings (9)	Davis (7)	Madison Square Garden; 11,348	39–33
73	March 28; 6:30 p.m. CST	@ Boston	L 107–114	Aguirre (28)	Cummings (14)	Blackman, Garnett (5)	Boston Garden; 14,890	39–34
74	March 30; 6:35 p.m. CST	@ Philadelphia	L 110–118	Aguirre (26)	Cummings, Garnett (10)	Davis (6)	The Spectrum; 15,111	39–35

April: 4–4 (home: 2–1; road: 2–3)

Game	Date	Team	Score	High points	High rebounds	High assists	Location Attendance	Record
75	April 1; 12 Noon CST	@ Washington	L 98–102	Aguirre (35)	Cummings (11)	Davis (6)	Capital Centre; 6,117	39–36
76	April 3; 7:35 p.m. CST	Portland	L 88–91	Aguirre (23)	Ellis (11)	Aguirre (5)	Reunion Arena; 14,468	39–37
77	April 6; 7:35 p.m. CST	San Antonio	W 131–118	Blackman (32)	Cummings, Nimphius (10)	Davis (9)	Reunion Arena; 14,575	40–37
78	April 7; 7:35 p.m. CST	Utah	W 109–100	Blackman (32)	Garnett (9)	Davis (7)	Reunion Arena; 17,007	41–37
79	April 10; 9:35 p.m. CST	@ San Diego	W 116–114	Aguirre (34)	Cummings (14)	Blackman (10)	San Diego Sports Arena; 4,262	42–37
80	April 12; 8:35 p.m. CST	@ Phoenix	L 118–119	Aguirre (34)	Cummings (8)	Davis (10)	Arizona Veterans Memorial Coliseum; 11,576	42–38
81	April 13; 9:30 p.m. CST	@ Los Angeles	W 104–103	Aguirre, Vincent (20)	Cummings (16)	Davis (5)	The Forum; 14,688	43–38
82	April 15; 5:00 p.m. CST	@ Golden State	L 96–98	Ellis (31)	Turner (8)	Turner (7)	Oakland–Alameda County Coliseum Arena; 6,733	43–39

1983–84 schedule

== Playoffs ==
1984 playoff game log
Western Conference First Round: 3–2 (home: 2–1; road: 1–1)

Game	Date	Team	Score	High points	High rebounds	High assists	Location Attendance	Series
1	April 17; 7:00 p.m. CST	Seattle	W 88–86	Aguirre (20)	Aguirre (11)	Davis (10)	Reunion Arena; 17,007	1–0
2	April 19; 7:30 p.m. CST	Seattle	L 92–95	Blackman (28)	Aguirre (17)	Blackman (7)	Reunion Arena; 17,007	1–1
3	April 21; 2:30 p.m. CST	@ Seattle	L 94–104	Blackman (27)	Vincent (10)	Blackman (5)	Seattle Center Coliseum; 10,229	1–2
4	April 24; 9:30 p.m. CST	@ Seattle	W 107–96	Aguirre (29)	Aguirre, Vincent (11)	Davis (8)	Kingdome; 11,893	2–2
5	April 26; 7:00 p.m. CST	Seattle	W 105–104 (OT)	Blackman (29)	Vincent (10)	Blackman (8)	Moody Coliseum; 9,007	3–2

Western Conference Semifinals: 1–4 (home: 1–1; road: 0–3)

Game	Date	Team	Score	High points	High rebounds	High assists	Location Attendance	Series
1	April 28; 2:30 p.m. CST	@ Los Angeles	L 91–134	Aguirre (16)	Nimphius (10)	Davis, Turner (4)	The Forum; 13,512	0–1
2	May 1; 10:00 p.m. CDT	@ Los Angeles	L 101–117	Blackman (27)	Ellis (8)	Aguirre (5)	The Forum; 15,298	0–2
3	May 4; 8:00 p.m. CDT	Los Angeles	W 125–115	Blackman (31)	Cummings (14)	Davis, Harper (6)	Reunion Arena; 17,007	1–2
4	May 6; 2:30 p.m. CDT	Los Angeles	L 115–122 (OT)	Aguirre (34)	Aguirre, Vincent (7)	Aguirre, Blackman (6)	Reunion Arena; 17,007	1–3
5	May 8; 10:00 p.m. CDT	@ Los Angeles	L 99–115	Blackman (25)	Ellis (10)	Davis (6)	The Forum; 16,644	1–4

1984 schedule

== Player statistics ==
=== Ragular season ===
Player	POS	GP	GS	MP	REB	AST	STL	BLK	PTS	MPG	RPG	APG	SPG	BPG	PPG
Kurt Nimphius	C	82	46	2,284	513	176	41	144	646	27.9	6.3	2.1	.5	1.8	7.9
Derek Harper	PG	82	1	1,712	172	239	95	21	469	20.9	2.1	2.9	1.2	.3	5.7
Rolando Blackman	SG	81	81	3,025	373	288	56	37	1,815	37.3	4.6	3.6	.7	.5	22.4
Brad Davis	PG	81	81	2,665	187	561	94	13	896	32.9	2.3	6.9	1.2	.2	11.1
Pat Cummings	PF	80	80	2,492	658	158	64	23	1,045	31.2	8.2	2.0	.8	.3	13.1
Bill Garnett	PF	80	34	1,529	331	128	44	66	411	19.1	4.1	1.6	.6	.8	5.1
Mark Aguirre	SF	79	79	2,900	469	358	80	22	2,330	36.7	5.9	4.5	1.0	.3	29.5
Dale Ellis	SF	67	2	1,059	250	56	41	9	549	15.8	3.7	.8	.6	.1	8.2
Jay Vincent	SF	61	5	1,421	247	114	30	10	672	23.3	4.0	1.9	.5	.2	11.0
Elston Turner	SF	47	1	536	93	59	26	0	137	11.4	2.0	1.3	.6	.0	2.9
Mark West	C	34	0	202	46	13	1	15	37	5.9	1.4	.4	.0	.4	1.1
Roger Phegley^{†}	SG	10	0	76	9	9	1	0	21	7.6	.9	.9	.1	.0	2.1
Jim Spanarkel	SG	7	0	54	7	5	6	0	24	7.7	1.0	.7	.9	.0	3.4

- ^{†} Denotes player spent time with another team in the season. Stats reflect time with the Mavericks only.

=== Playoffs ===
Player	POS	GP	GS	MP	REB	AST	STL	BLK	PTS	MPG	RPG	APG	SPG	BPG	PPG
Rolando Blackman	SG	10		397	41	40	6	4	239	39.7	4.1	4.0	.6	.4	23.9
Jay Vincent	SF	10		353	70	19	7	1	152	35.3	7.0	1.9	.7	.1	15.2
Mark Aguirre	SF	10		350	76	32	5	5	220	35.0	7.6	3.2	.5	.5	22.0
Brad Davis	PG	10		304	19	50	6	0	81	30.4	1.9	5.0	.6	.0	8.1
Pat Cummings	PF	10		300	72	15	4	2	108	30.0	7.2	1.5	.4	.2	10.8
Derek Harper	PG	10		226	20	28	11	2	50	22.6	2.0	2.8	1.1	.2	5.0
Kurt Nimphius	C	10		178	53	13	0	14	42	17.8	5.3	1.3	.0	1.4	4.2
Dale Ellis	SF	8		178	42	4	10	2	59	22.3	5.3	.5	1.3	.3	7.4
Bill Garnett	PF	8		74	22	4	0	2	38	9.3	2.8	.5	.0	.3	4.8
Elston Turner	SF	8		53	10	8	6	1	14	6.6	1.3	1.0	.8	.1	1.8
Mark West	C	4		32	7	3	0	3	12	8.0	1.8	.8	.0	.8	3.0
Roger Phegley	SG	1		5	0	1	2	0	2	5.0	.0	1.0	2.0	.0	2.0

== Awards and records ==
- Mark Aguirre, NBA All-Star Game

== See also ==
- 1983–84 NBA season
