= Brant Weidner =

American basketball player

Personal information
- Born: October 28, 1960 (age 66) Orefield, Pennsylvania, U.S.
- Listed height: 6 ft 9 in (2.06 m)
- Listed weight: 230 lb (104 kg)

Career information
- High school: Parkland (South Whitehall Township, Pennsylvania)
- College: William & Mary (1979–1983)
- NBA draft: 1983: 4th round, 90th overall pick
- Drafted by: San Antonio Spurs
- Playing career: 1983–1984
- Position: Power forward
- Number: 25

Career history
- 1983–1984: EBBC
- 1984: San Antonio Spurs
- Stats at NBA.com
- Stats at Basketball Reference

Brant Clifford Weidner (born October 28, 1960) is an American former professional basketball player from the National Basketball Association. He played one season in the league, appearing in eight regular-season games.

Weidner played basketball at Parkland High School in South Whitehall Township, Pennsylvania and then at William & Mary in Williamsburg, Virginia.

In 1983, he was selected by the San Antonio Spurs with the 20th pick of the 4th round (90th overall) in the 1983 NBA draft.

== Career statistics ==
Legend
GP	Games played	GS	Games started	MPG	Minutes per game
FG%	Field goal percentage	3P%	3-point field goal percentage	FT%	Free throw percentage
RPG	Rebounds per game	APG	Assists per game	SPG	Steals per game
BPG	Blocks per game	PPG	Points per game	**Bold**	Career high

=== NBA ===
==== Regular season ====
Year	Team	GP	GS	MPG	FG%	3P%	FT%	RPG	APG	SPG	BPG	PPG
1983–84	San Antonio	8	0	4.8	.222	–	1.000	1.4	.0	.0	.3	1.0
