= 1983–84 Kansas City Kings season =

NBA professional basketball team season

- Head coach: Cotton Fitzsimmons
- Owners: Joseph Benvenuti; Stephen Cippa; Robert Cook; Gregg Lukenbill; Frank Lukenbill; Frank McCormick
- Arena: Kemper Arena

Results
- Record: 38–44 (.463)
- Place: Division: 3rd (Midwest); Conference: 8th (Western)
- Playoff finish: West First Round (eliminated 0-3)
- Stats at Basketball Reference

Local media
- Television: KSHB-TV
- Radio: KMBZ

The 1983–84 Kansas City Kings season was the Kings 35th season in the NBA, their 12th, and penultimate season in Kansas City (their ninth playing full-time in Kansas City).

== Draft picks ==
Round	Pick	Player	Position	Nationality	College
1	13	Ennis Whatley	G	United States	Alabama
2	38	Chris McNealy		United States	San Jose State
3	60	Steve Harriel		United States	Washington State
4	84	Mike Jackson		United States	Wyoming
5	106	Lorenza Andrews		United States	Oklahoma State
6	130	Alvis Rogers		United States	Wake Forest
7	152	Dane Suttle	SG	United States	Pepperdine
8	176	Preston Neumayr		United States	UC Davis
9	197	Bernard Hill		United States	Oklahoma Panhandle State
10	219	Aaron Haskins		United States	Washington State

== Roster ==
1983–84 Kansas City Kings roster
Players

Pos.	No.	Player	Height	Weight	DOB	From
G	10	Don Buse	6 ft 4 in (1.93 m)	190 lb (86 kg)		Evansville
G	22	Larry Drew	6 ft 1 in (1.85 m)	170 lb (77 kg)		Missouri
G/F	8	Eddie Johnson	6 ft 7 in (2.01 m)	215 lb (98 kg)		Illinois
G/F	25	Billy Knight	6 ft 6 in (1.98 m)	195 lb (88 kg)		Pittsburgh
F/C	50	Joe C. Meriweather	6 ft 10 in (2.08 m)	215 lb (98 kg)		Southern Illinois
F	40	Larry Micheaux	6 ft 9 in (2.06 m)	220 lb (100 kg)		Houston
F	20	Ed Nealy	6 ft 7 in (2.01 m)	238 lb (108 kg)		Kansas State
F	53	Mark Olberding	6 ft 8 in (2.03 m)	225 lb (102 kg)		Minnesota
F/C	35	Dave Robisch	6 ft 10 in (2.08 m)	235 lb (107 kg)		Kansas
G	2	Dane Suttle	6 ft 3 in (1.91 m)	190 lb (86 kg)		Pepperdine
G	24	Reggie Theus	6 ft 7 in (2.01 m)	190 lb (86 kg)		UNLV
C	41	LaSalle Thompson	6 ft 10 in (2.08 m)	245 lb (111 kg)		Texas
G/F	42	Mike Woodson	6 ft 5 in (1.96 m)	195 lb (88 kg)		Indiana

Coaches
Head coach
- Cotton Fitzsimmons
Assistant(s)
- Frank Hamblen

Legend
- (DP) Unsigned draft pick
- (FA) Free agent
- (S) Suspended
- Injured

== Regular season ==
=== Season standings ===
Midwest Division	W	L	PCT	GB	Home	Road	Div
y-Utah Jazz	45	37	.549	–	31–10	14–27	15–15
x-Dallas Mavericks	43	39	.524	2	31–10	12–29	19–11
x-Denver Nuggets	38	44	.463	7	27–14	11–30	16–14
x-Kansas City Kings	38	44	.463	7	26–15	12–29	16–14
San Antonio Spurs	37	45	.451	8	28–13	9–32	14–16
Houston Rockets	29	53	.354	16	21–20	8–33	9–21

#	Western Conference				
#	Team	W	L	PCT	GB
1	c-Los Angeles Lakers	54	28	.659	–
2	y-Utah Jazz	45	37	.549	9
3	x-Portland Trail Blazers	48	34	.585	6
4	x-Dallas Mavericks	43	39	.524	11
5	x-Seattle SuperSonics	42	40	.512	12
6	x-Phoenix Suns	41	41	.500	13
7	x-Denver Nuggets	38	44	.463	16
8	x-Kansas City Kings	38	44	.463	16
9	San Antonio Spurs	37	45	.451	17
10	Golden State Warriors	37	45	.451	17
11	San Diego Clippers	30	52	.366	24
12	Houston Rockets	29	53	.354	25

z – clinched division title
y – clinched division title
x – clinched playoff spot

== Game log ==
=== Regular season ===
1983–84 game log
Total: 38–44 (Home: 26–15; Road: 12–29)
October: 0–2 (home: 0–2; road: 0–0)

Game	Date	Team	Score	High points	High rebounds	High assists	Location Attendance	Record
1	October 28, 1983	Los Angeles	L 107–117				Kemper Arena	0–1
2	October 30, 1983	Seattle	L 116–121				Kemper Arena	0–2

November: 8–6 (home: 5–1; road: 3–5)

Game	Date	Team	Score	High points	High rebounds	High assists	Location Attendance	Record
4	November 3, 1983	Denver	L 128–131				Kemper Arena	1–3
7	November 9, 1983	@ Milwaukee	L 93–95				MECCA Arena	2–5
8	November 11, 1983	@ Philadelphia	L 100–108				The Spectrum	2–6
9	November 12, 1983	@ Detroit	L 106–131				Pontiac Silverdome	2–7
10	November 15, 1983	@ Washington	W 101–100				Capital Centre	3–7
13	November 25, 1983	@ Dallas	L 96–98				Reunion Arena	5–8
14	November 26, 1983	Utah	W 117–116				Kemper Arena	6–8
15	November 28, 1983	Portland	W 113–104				Kemper Arena	7–8
16	November 30, 1983	@ Phoenix	W 120–118				Arizona Veterans Memorial Coliseum	8–8

December: 5–8 (home: 4–2; road: 1–6)

Game	Date	Team	Score	High points	High rebounds	High assists	Location Attendance	Record
18	December 3, 1983	@ Utah	L 107–112				Salt Palace Acord Arena	8–10
19	December 6, 1983	Dallas	W 112–103				Kemper Arena	9–10
20	December 8, 1983	@ Los Angeles	L 106–129				The Forum	9–11
22	December 14, 1983	@ Seattle	W 105–99				Kingdome	11–11
24	December 17, 1983	@ Phoenix	L 99–119				Arizona Veterans Memorial Coliseum	11–13
25	December 20, 1983	Denver	W 131–114				Kemper Arena	12–13
27	December 27, 1983	Philadelphia	L 109–112				Kemper Arena	13–14

January: 4–10 (home: 4–4; road: 0–6)

Game	Date	Team	Score	High points	High rebounds	High assists	Location Attendance	Record
30	January 3, 1984	@ Portland	L 104–123				Memorial Coliseum	13–17
32	January 6, 1984	@ Utah	L 110–130				Salt Palace Acord Arena	14–18
33	January 7, 1984	Phoenix	W 100–98				Kemper Arena	14–19
34	January 10, 1984	Dallas	W 112–102				Kemper Arena	15–19
35	January 12, 1984	Los Angeles	L 89–95				Kemper Arena	15–20
38	January 17, 1984	Boston	L 113–122				Kemper Arena	16–22
39	January 20, 1984	@ Denver	L 114–116				McNichols Sports Arena	16–23
40	January 21, 1984	@ Portland	L 94–114				Memorial Coliseum	16–24
41	January 24, 1984	New Jersey	W 113–104				Kemper Arena	17–24
42	January 26, 1984	Seattle	L 106–114				Kemper Arena	17–25
All-Star Break

February: 8–6 (home: 6–3; road: 2–3)

Game	Date	Team	Score	High points	High rebounds	High assists	Location Attendance	Record
44	February 1, 1984	@ Boston	L 110–119				Boston Garden	17–27
45	February 3, 1984	@ New Jersey	W 113–104				Brendan Byrne Arena	18–27
46	February 4, 1984	Denver	W 107–100				Kemper Arena	19–27
47	February 7, 1984	Milwaukee	L 110–112 (OT)				Kemper Arena	19–28
49	February 10, 1984	@ Dallas	L 96–115				Reunion Arena	20–29
50	February 11, 1984	Washington	W 94–91				Kemper Arena	21–29
51	February 14, 1984	New York	L 100–106				Kemper Arena	21–30
52	February 16, 1984	Utah	W 121–99				Kemper Arena	22–30
53	February 18, 1984	Atlanta	W 111–106				Kemper Arena	23–30
54	February 21, 1984	Detroit	W 119–112				Kemper Arena	24–30
55	February 23, 1984	Phoenix	L 95–107				Kemper Arena	24–31
56	February 25, 1984	@ Denver	L 136–148				McNichols Sports Arena	24–32

March: 10–8 (home: 5–2; road: 5–6)

Game	Date	Team	Score	High points	High rebounds	High assists	Location Attendance	Record
59	March 2, 1984	@ Dallas	L 94–108				Reunion Arena	26–33
60	March 3, 1984	Dallas	W 105–103				Kemper Arena	27–33
61	March 6, 1984	Portland	W 128–110				Kemper Arena	28–33
64	March 14, 1984	@ Atlanta	W 101–93				The Omni	30–34
66	March 17, 1984	@ New York	L 109–123				Madison Square Garden	31–35
69	March 21, 1984	Los Angeles	L 116–123				Kemper Arena	33–36
70	March 23, 1984	@ Denver	L 116–126				McNichols Sports Arena	33–37
72	March 27, 1984	@ Utah	L 106–110				Salt Palace Acord Arena	34–38
73	March 28, 1984	@ Seattle	L 94–111				Kingdome	34–39
74	March 29, 1984	@ Portland	L 113–120				Memorial Coliseum	34–40
75	March 31, 1984	Utah	W 105–103				Kemper Arena	35–40

April: 3–4 (home: 2–1; road: 1–3)

Game	Date	Team	Score	High points	High rebounds	High assists	Location Attendance	Record
76	April 3, 1984	@ Phoenix	L 109–113				Arizona Veterans Memorial Coliseum	35–41
78	April 6, 1984	@ Los Angeles	L 97–112				The Forum	36–42
80	April 10, 1984	Seattle	L 113–125				Kemper Arena	36–44

1983–84 schedule

== Playoffs ==
1984 playoff game log
First Round: 0–3 (home: 0–1; road: 0–2)

Game	Date	Team	Score	High points	High rebounds	High assists	Location Attendance	Series
1	April 18, 1984	@ Los Angeles	L 105–116	Eddie Johnson (25)	LaSalle Thompson (7)	Larry Drew (7)	The Forum; 13,918	0–1
2	April 20, 1984	@ Los Angeles	L 102–109	LaSalle Thompson (23)	LaSalle Thompson (14)	Reggie Theus (6)	The Forum; 14,986	0–2
3	April 22, 1984	Los Angeles	L 102–108	Theus, Woodson (22)	Larry Micheaux (10)	Reggie Theus (7)	Kemper Arena; 7,261	0–3

1984 schedule

== See also ==
- 1983–84 NBA season
