= 1983–84 Denver Nuggets season =

NBA professional basketball team season

- Head coach: Doug Moe
- Arena: McNichols Sports Arena

Results
- Record: 38–44 (.463)
- Place: Division: 3rd (Midwest); Conference: 7th (Western)
- Playoff finish: West First Round (lost to Jazz 2–3)
- Stats at Basketball Reference

Local media
- Television: KWGN
- Radio: KOA

The 1983–84 Denver Nuggets season was their 17th season, and their eighth in the NBA. The Nuggets head coach was Doug Moe and his assistant coach was Bill Ficke.

In the playoffs, the Nuggets lost to the Utah Jazz in five games in the First Round.

== Draft picks ==
Round	Pick	Player	Position	Nationality	School/Club team
1	15	Howard Carter	SG	United States	LSU
2	37	David Russell	SF	United States	St. John's
3	61	David Little		United States	Oklahoma
4	83	York Gross		United States	UC-Santa Barbara
5	107	James Braddock		United States	North Carolina
6	129	Glen Green		United States	Murray State
7	153	Maurice McDaniel		United States	Catawba College
8	175	Cliff Tribus		United States	Davidson
9	198	Bobby Van Noy		United States	Catawba College
10	218	Cleveland McCrae		United States	Catawba College

== Roster ==
1983–84 Denver Nuggets roster
Players

Pos.	No.	Player	Height	Weight	DOB	From
PF	35	Richard Anderson	6 ft 10 in (2.08 m)	240 lb (109 kg)		UC Santa Barbara
SG	32	Howard Carter	6 ft 5 in (1.96 m)	215 lb (98 kg)		LSU
PF	33	Kenny Dennard	6 ft 8 in (2.03 m)	220 lb (100 kg)		Duke
SG	23	T.R. Dunn	6 ft 4 in (1.93 m)	192 lb (87 kg)		Alabama
SG	10	Keith Edmonson	6 ft 5 in (1.96 m)	195 lb (88 kg)		Purdue
SF	2	Alex English	6 ft 7 in (2.01 m)	190 lb (86 kg)		South Carolina
G	5	Mike Evans	6 ft 1 in (1.85 m)	170 lb (77 kg)		Kansas State
PF	24	Bill Hanzlik	6 ft 7 in (2.01 m)	185 lb (84 kg)		Notre Dame
C	44	Dan Issel	6 ft 9 in (2.06 m)	235 lb (107 kg)		Kentucky
SF	30	Anthony Roberts	6 ft 5 in (1.96 m)	185 lb (84 kg)		Oral Roberts
C	25	Dave Robisch	6 ft 10 in (2.08 m)	235 lb (107 kg)		Kansas
C	34	Danny Schayes	6 ft 11 in (2.11 m)	235 lb (107 kg)		Syracuse
PF	55	Kiki Vandeweghe	6 ft 8 in (2.03 m)	220 lb (100 kg)		UCLA
PG	21	Rob Williams	6 ft 2 in (1.88 m)	175 lb (79 kg)		Houston

Coaches
Head coach
- (United States) Doug Moe

Legend
- (DP) Unsigned draft pick
- (FA) Free agent
- (S) Suspended
- Injured

== Regular season ==
=== Season standings ===
Midwest Division	W	L	PCT	GB	Home	Road	Div
y-Utah Jazz	45	37	.549	–	31–10	14–27	15–15
x-Dallas Mavericks	43	39	.524	2	31–10	12–29	19–11
x-Denver Nuggets	38	44	.463	7	27–14	11–30	16–14
x-Kansas City Kings	38	44	.463	7	26–15	12–29	16–14
San Antonio Spurs	37	45	.451	8	28–13	9–32	14–16
Houston Rockets	29	53	.354	16	21–20	8–33	9–21

#	Western Conference				
#	Team	W	L	PCT	GB
1	c-Los Angeles Lakers	54	28	.659	–
2	y-Utah Jazz	45	37	.549	9
3	x-Portland Trail Blazers	48	34	.585	6
4	x-Dallas Mavericks	43	39	.524	11
5	x-Seattle SuperSonics	42	40	.512	12
6	x-Phoenix Suns	41	41	.500	13
7	x-Denver Nuggets	38	44	.463	16
8	x-Kansas City Kings	38	44	.463	16
9	San Antonio Spurs	37	45	.451	17
10	Golden State Warriors	37	45	.451	17
11	San Diego Clippers	30	52	.366	24
12	Houston Rockets	29	53	.354	25

Notes

- z, y – division champions
- x – clinched playoff spot

== Game log ==
=== Regular season ===
1983–84 game log
Total: 38–44 (home: 27–14; road: 11–30)
October: 1–1 (home: 1–0; road: 0–1)

Game	Date	Team	Score	High points	High rebounds	High assists	Location Attendance	Record
1	October 28	Utah	W 139–125				McNichols Sports Arena	1–0
2	October 29	@ San Diego	L 128–141				San Diego Sports Arena	1–1

November: 8–7 (home: 5–3; road: 3–4)

Game	Date	Team	Score	High points	High rebounds	High assists	Location Attendance	Record
3	November 1	Dallas	L 124–130				McNichols Sports Arena	1–2
4	November 3	@ Kansas City	W 131–128				Kemper Arena	2–2
11	November 5	San Diego	W 127–121				McNichols Sports Arena	3–2
6	November 8	Los Angeles	L 124–133				McNichols Sports Arena	3–3
7	November 12	@ San Antonio	L 107–126				HemisFair Arena	3–4
8	November 15	Boston	L 124–140				McNichols Sports Arena	3–5
9	November 17	@Golden State	W 131–120				Oakland–Alameda County Coliseum Arena	4–5
10	November 18	Houston	W 134–127				McNichols Sports Arena	5–5
11	November 19	Milwaukee	W 133–126				McNichols Sports Arena	6–5
12	November 22	@ Portland	L 116–156				Memorial Coliseum	6–6
13	November 23	San Diego	W 133–114				McNichols Sports Arena	7–6
14	November 25	@ Utah	L 124–126				Salt Palace Acord Arena	7–7
15	November 26	Phoenix	W 107–104				McNichols Sports Arena	8–7
16	November 29	@ Atlanta	W 105–96				The Omni	9–7
17	November 30	@ Milwaukee	L 122–139				MECCA Arena	9–8

December: 5–10 (home: 4–3; road: 1–7)

Game	Date	Team	Score	High points	High rebounds	High assists	Location Attendance	Record
18	December 3	Seattle	W 121–111				McNichols Sports Arena	10–8
19	December 6	@ New York	W 117–112				Madison Square Garden	11–8
20	December 7	@ Philadelphia	L 128–133				The Spectrum	11–9
21	December 9	@ Boston (at Hartford, CT)	L 90–119				Hartford Civic Center	11–10
22	December 11	@ New Jersey	L 130–141				Brendan Byrne Arena	11–11
23	December 13	Detroit	L 184–186 (3OT)				McNichols Sports Arena	11–12
24	December 16	Portland	L 115–119				McNichols Sports Arena	11–13
25	December 18	New Jersey	W 122–118				McNichols Sports Arena	12–13
26	December 20	@ Kansas City	L 114–131				Kemper Arena	12–14
27	December 22	Indiana	L 132–133				McNichols Sports Arena	12–15
28	December 23	@ Utah	L 116–118				Salt Palace Acord Arena	12–16
29	December 26	@ Phoenix	L 133–140 (OT)				Arizona Veterans Memorial Coliseum	12–17
30	December 27	@ Los Angeles	L 116–118				The Forum	12–18
31	December 29	Philadelphia	W 101–89				McNichols Sports Arena	13–18
32	December 30	Utah	W 135–130				McNichols Sports Arena	14–18

January: 5–7 (home: 4–2; road: 1–5)

Game	Date	Team	Score	High points	High rebounds	High assists	Location Attendance	Record
33	January 3	Seattle	L 109–110				McNichols Sports Arena	14–19
34	January 6	@ Portland	L 129–144				Memorial Coliseum	15–20
35	January 7	Dallas	W 141–117				McNichols Sports Arena	16–20
36	January 11	San Antonio	W 163–155				McNichols Sports Arena	17–20
37	January 13	Los Angeles	L 134–141				McNichols Sports Arena	16–21
38	January 15	@ Dallas	L 107–126				Reunion Arena	16–22
39	January 17	@ Houston	L 115–124				The Summit	16–23
40	January 18	@ San Antonio	L 127–148				HemisFair Arena	16–24
41	January 20	Kansas City	W 116–114				McNichols Sports Arena	17–24
42	January 21	Golden State	W 126–115				McNichols Sports Arena	18–24
43	January 25	@ Indiana	L 112–117				Market Square Arena	182–25
44	January 26	@ Chicago	W 126–125				Chicago Stadium	19–25
All-Star Break

February: 6–10 (home: 3–4; road: 3–6)

Game	Date	Team	Score	High points	High rebounds	High assists	Location Attendance	Record
45	February 1	Los Angeles	L 108–116				McNichols Sports Arena	19–26
46	February 3	@ Dallas	W 114–111				Reunion Arena	20–26
47	February 4	@ Kansas City	L 100–107				Kemper Arena	20–27
48	February 7	@ Seattle	L 105–115				Kingdome	20–28
49	February 8	Dallas	L 114–120				McNichols Sports Arena	20–29
50	February 10	@ Portland	L 117–123				Memorial Coliseum	20–30
51	February 11	New York	L 112–138				McNichols Sports Arena	20–31
52	February 14	Washington	L 96–108				McNichols Sports Arena	20–32
53	February 16	Atlanta	W 117–102				McNichols Sports Arena	21–32
54	February 17	@ Los Angeles	W 141–138				The Forum	22–32
55	February 19	@ Seattle	L 120–132				Kingdome	22–33
56	February 21	@ Golden State	L 133–135				Oakland–Alameda County Coliseum Arena	22–34
57	February 22	San Antonio	W 127–121				McNichols Sports Arena	23–34
58	February 24	@ Phoenix	W 117–100				Arizona Veterans Memorial Coliseum	24–34
59	February 25	Kansas City	W 148–136				McNichols Sports Arena	25–34
60	February 28	@ Golden State	L 137–140 (OT)				Oakland–Alameda County Coliseum Arena	25–35

March: 10–5 (home: 8–0; road: 2–5)

Game	Date	Team	Score	High points	High rebounds	High assists	Location Attendance	Record
61	March 1	Cleveland	W 119–113				McNichols Sports Arena	26–35
62	March 3	Utah	W 131–122				McNichols Sports Arena	27–35
63	March 6	Houston	W 130–128				McNichols Sports Arena	28–35
64	March 9	@ San Diego	L 126–134				San Diego Sports Arena	28–36
65	March 11	Portland	W 149–123				McNichols Sports Arena	29–36
66	March 13	@ Washington	L 103–108				Capital Centre	29–37
67	March 14	@ Detroit	W 125–121				Pontiac Silverdome	30–37
68	March 16	@ Cleveland	W 118–102				Richfield Coliseum	31–37
69	March 18	Chicago	W 107–104				McNichols Sports Arena	32–37
70	March 20	@ Phoenix	L 120–146				Arizona Veterans Memorial Coliseum	32–38
71	March 21	Houston	W 134–125				McNichols Sports Arena	33–38
72	March 23	Kansas City	W 126–116				McNichols Sports Arena	34–38
73	March 24	@ Dallas	L 101–119				Reunion Arena	34–39
74	March 27	@ Houston	L 137–140				The Summit	34–40
75	March 30	San Antonio	W 145–136				McNichols Sports Arena	35–40

April: 3–4 (home: 2–2; road: 1–2)

Game	Date	Team	Score	High points	High rebounds	High assists	Location Attendance	Record
76	April 1	San Diego	W 129–103				McNichols Sports Arena	36–40
77	April 3	Seattle	W 124–113				McNichols Sports Arena	37–40
78	April 5	Golden State	L 124–128				McNichols Sports Arena	37–41
79	April 8	Phoenix	L 121–126				McNichols Sports Arena	37–42
80	April 10	@ Utah (at Las Vegas, NV)	L 120–135				Thomas & Mack Center	37–43
81	April 11	@ Houston	W 130–110				The Summit	38–43
82	April 15	@ San Antonio	L 154–157				HemisFair Arena	38–44

1983–84 schedule

=== Playoffs ===
1984 playoff game log
Western Conference First Round: 2–3 (home: 1–1; road: 1–2)

Game	Date	Team	Score	High points	High rebounds	High assists	Location Attendance	Series
1	April 17	@ Utah	L 121–123	VanDeWeghe (33)	Issel (10)	Williams (8)	Salt Palace Acord Arena; 10,255	0–1
2	April 19	@ Utah	W 132–116	Issel (33)	Dunn (10)	Williams (5)	Salt Palace Acord Arena; 12,413	1–1
3	April 22	Utah	W 121–117	English (29)	Dunn (10)	English (6)	McNichols Sports Arena; 14,681	2–1
4	April 24	Utah	L 124–129	Issel (32)	English (10)	English (6)	McNichols Sports Arena; 16,108	2–2
5	April 26	@ Utah	L 111–127	Issel (25)	English (11)	English (9)	Salt Palace Acord Arena; 12,731	2–3

1984 schedule

== Awards, records, and honors ==
- T.R. Dunn, NBA All-Defensive Second Team
- On December 13, 1983, the Nuggets played in the highest scoring game in NBA history, losing to the Detroit Pistons 186–184.
