= Darrell Lockhart =

American basketball player

Personal information
- Born: September 14, 1960 (age 66) Thomaston, Georgia, U.S.
- Listed height: 6 ft 9 in (2.06 m)
- Listed weight: 245 lb (111 kg)

Career information
- High school: Robert E. Lee (Thomaston, Georgia)
- College: Auburn (1979–1983)
- NBA draft: 1983: 2nd round, 35th overall pick
- Drafted by: San Antonio Spurs
- Position: Center
- Number: 32

Career history
- 1983: San Antonio Spurs

Career highlights
- Third-team Parade All-American (1979)
- Stats at NBA.com
- Stats at Basketball Reference

Darrell Lockhart (born September 14, 1960, in Thomaston, Georgia) is a retired American professional basketball center.

== College career ==
Lockhart attended Auburn University, where he played college basketball with the Auburn Tigers.

== Professional career ==
Lockhart was drafted by the San Antonio Spurs, in the second round (35^{th} overall), of the 1983 NBA draft. Lockhart spent one season in the National Basketball Association (NBA), as a member of the Spurs, during the 1983–84 season. He spent most of his professional career playing in Spain.

=== Career teams ===
- High School. R. E. Lee Institute (Thomaston, Georgia).
- 1979–1983 Auburn Tigers
- 1983–1984 San Antonio Spurs. 2 games
- 1983–1984 Bancoroma Roma.
- 1984–1985 Maccabi Brussels.
- 1985–1986 Pepper Mestre.
- 1986–1988 Cajabilbao
- 1988–1989 Teorema Arese
- 1989–1994 CB Sevilla.
- 1994–1995 CB Girona.
- 1995–1996 Xacobeo 99 Ourense.
- 1996–1997 BC Andorra.
- 1997–1998 Los Barrios.

== Career statistics ==
Legend
GP	Games played	GS	Games started	MPG	Minutes per game
FG%	Field goal percentage	3P%	3-point field goal percentage	FT%	Free throw percentage
RPG	Rebounds per game	APG	Assists per game	SPG	Steals per game
BPG	Blocks per game	PPG	Points per game	**Bold**	Career high

=== NBA ===
==== Regular season ====
Year	Team	GP	GS	MPG	FG%	3P%	FT%	RPG	APG	SPG	BPG	PPG
1983–84	San Antonio	2	0	7.0	1.000	–	–	1.5	.0	.0	.0	2.0
