= Rod Foster =

American basketball player

Personal information
- Born: October 10, 1960 (age 66) Birmingham, Alabama, U.S.
- Listed height: 6 ft 1 in (1.85 m)
- Listed weight: 160 lb (73 kg)

Career information
- High school: St. Thomas Aquinas (New Britain, Connecticut)
- College: UCLA (1979–1983)
- NBA draft: 1983: 2nd round, 28th overall pick
- Drafted by: Phoenix Suns
- Playing career: 1983–1986
- Position: Point guard
- Number: 10

Career history
- 1983–1986: Phoenix Suns

Career highlights
- Second-team All-American – UPI (1981); 2× First-team All-Pac-10 (1981, 1983); Second-team Parade All-American (1979)
- Stats at NBA.com
- Stats at Basketball Reference

Roderick Allen Foster (born October 10, 1960) is an American former professional basketball player (6'1", 160 lb) who played for the Phoenix Suns of the National Basketball Association (NBA). He was drafted out of UCLA in the second round of the 1983 NBA draft (28th pick overall).

== Career ==
As a senior at St Thomas Aquinas High School in New Britain, Connecticut, "Rocket" Rod Foster averaged 30.2 points per game, and led his team to the State Championship. He was named an Adidas All-American and second team Parade All-American.

A prized recruit, Foster chose to attend UCLA, recruited to the school by coach Larry Brown.

As a freshman at UCLA, Foster helped lead the Bruins to the 1980 NCAA Division I Basketball Tournament Finals in 1980, where they lost to the Louisville Cardinals, playing under coach Larry Brown. Foster led UCLA with 16 points in the 59–54 loss, adding 6 steals and 5 assists. In the second round of the 1980 NCAA tournament, #8 seed UCLA upset the #1 overall seed DePaul Blue Demons, led by Foster's 18 points in a 77–71 victory. Foster then had 19 points in the next NCAA tournament game, a 72–68 win over the Ohio State Buckeyes. Overall, as a freshman, Foster averaged 11.5 points, 1.9 rebounds and 3.2 assists.

In December 1981, the NCAA put the UCLA basketball program on a two–year probation for violations.

Graduating from UCLA, Foster averaged 12.1 points and 2.1 assists per game, shooting 52.0% from the floor and 88.0% from the line in his 113-game UCLA career.

Foster is listed as one of the best free throw shooters in NCAA history, making 95 of 100 free throw attempts or 95.0% completion in his 1982 season. In 2025 Foster was inducted to the UCLA Athletics Hall of Fame.[6]

Drafted in the 2nd round (28th overall pick) of the 1983 NBA draft, Foster's playing career was ended prematurely due to injury. In his NBA career, Foster averaged 7.2 points and 2.3 assists in 207 career games with the Phoenix Suns.

In March, 1986, Foster suffered a compound fracture in his left leg in a jeep accident in the Arizona desert which ended his playing career. Foster was driving, with Phoenix Suns teammates Mike Sanders and Ed Pinckney as passengers, when the jeep tipped and crushed Foster's leg, causing severe career ending injuries.

== Personal ==
As of 2016, Foster was the head of the L.A. Rockets youth basketball program in Los Angeles. Early in 2016, he also briefly coached the boys varsity high school basketball team at the Windward School in Los Angeles.

In 2020, Foster was named to the CIAC Boys Basketball All–Century team. John Bagley, Kris Dunn, Johnny Egan, Mike Gminski, Calvin Murphy ( Naismith Memorial Basketball Hall of Fame), Harold Pressley and John Williamson were among the other 24 recipients.

== Career statistics ==
Legend
GP	Games played	GS	Games started	MPG	Minutes per game
FG%	Field goal percentage	3P%	3-point field goal percentage	FT%	Free throw percentage
RPG	Rebounds per game	APG	Assists per game	SPG	Steals per game
BPG	Blocks per game	PPG	Points per game	**Bold**	Career high

=== NBA ===
==== Regular season ====
Year	Team	GP	GS	MPG	FG%	3P%	FT%	RPG	APG	SPG	BPG	PPG
1983–84	Phoenix	**80**	**34**	**17.8**	.448	.262	**.787**	**1.5**	2.2	.7	**.1**	8.3
1984–85	Phoenix	79	1	16.7	**.450**	**.325**	.755	1.0	2.4	**.8**	.0	**8.8**
1985–86	Phoenix	48	0	14.7	.390	.281	.719	1.2	**2.5**	.5	.0	4.2
Career		207	35	16.6	.440	.298	.768	1.2	2.3	.7	.0	7.5

==== Playoffs ====
Year	Team	GP	GS	MPG	FG%	3P%	FT%	RPG	APG	SPG	BPG	PPG
1984	Phoenix	**16**		8.0	.256	.000	**1.000**	.8	1.1	.3	**.1**	1.8
1985	Phoenix	3	0	**18.7**	**.280**	.000	.750	**1.0**	**2.3**	**1.7**	.0	**6.7**
Career		19	0	9.7	.260	.000	.882	.8	1.3	.5	.1	2.6
