= 1983–84 San Antonio Spurs season =

- Head coach: Morris McHone (fired); Bob Bass (interim)
- General manager: Bob Bass
- Owner: Angelo Drossos
- Arena: HemisFair Arena

Results
- Record: 37–45 (.451)
- Place: Division: 5th (Midwest); Conference: 9th (Western)
- Playoff finish: Did not qualify
- Stats at Basketball Reference

The 1983–84 San Antonio Spurs season was the Spurs' eighth season in the NBA and 17th season as a franchise. This would be the first season in both the team's history under the San Antonio Spurs name and their existence in the NBA as a whole that they would miss out on competing in the NBA Playoffs (being a game behind both the Denver Nuggets and Kansas City Kings for one of the final playoff spots in the Western Conference), as well as the second time in franchise history that the team would miss out on competing in the playoffs altogether after they had previously missed the 1973 ABA Playoffs as the Dallas Chaparrals (in what was coincidentally their last season under their original team name before moving to San Antonio to become the Spurs going forward).

== Draft picks ==
Round	Pick	Player	Position	Nationality	College
1	19	John Paxson	PG	United States	Notre Dame
2	35	Darrell Lockhart		United States	Auburn
2	46	Kevin Williams	PG	United States	St. John's
4	90	Brant Weidner	F	United States	William & Mary
5	112	Jeff Pehl		United States	Richmond
6	136	Ricky Hooker		United States	St. Mary's
7	158	Keith Williams		United States	Oklahoma Panhandle State
8	182	Norville Brown		United States	Oklahoma Christian
9	203	Gary Gaspard		United States	St. Mary's
10	225	Lamar Heard		United States	Georgia

== Roster ==
1983–84 San Antonio Spurs roster
Players

Pos.	No.	Player	Height	Weight	DOB	From
PF	20	Gene Banks	6 ft 7 in (2.01 m)	215 lb (98 kg)	1959-05-15	Duke
SG	10	Ron Brewer	6 ft 4 in (1.93 m)	180 lb (82 kg)	1955-07-16	Arkansas
G/F	44	George Gervin	6 ft 7 in (2.01 m)	180 lb (82 kg)	1952-04-27	Eastern Michigan
C	53	Artis Gilmore	7 ft 2 in (2.18 m)	240 lb (109 kg)	1949-09-21	Jacksonville
PF	42	Edgar Jones	6 ft 10 in (2.08 m)	225 lb (102 kg)	1956-06-17	Nevada
PG	15	John Lucas	6 ft 3 in (1.91 m)	175 lb (79 kg)	1953-10-31	Maryland
C	31	Mark McNamara	6 ft 11 in (2.11 m)	235 lb (107 kg)	1959-06-08	California
SF	34	Mike Mitchell	6 ft 7 in (2.01 m)	215 lb (98 kg)	1956-01-01	Auburn
PG	00	Johnny Moore	6 ft 1 in (1.85 m)	175 lb (79 kg)	1958-03-03	Texas
PG	4	John Paxson	6 ft 2 in (1.88 m)	185 lb (84 kg)	1960-09-29	Notre Dame
PF	11	Fred Roberts	6 ft 10 in (2.08 m)	218 lb (99 kg)	1960-08-14	BYU
PF	25	Brant Weidner	6 ft 9 in (2.06 m)	230 lb (104 kg)	1960-10-28	William & Mary

Coaches
Head coach
- Morris McHone (fired)
- Bob Bass (interim)
Assistant(s)
- Allan Bristow

Legend
- (DP) Unsigned draft pick
- (FA) Free agent
- (S) Suspended
- Injured

Roster
Updated: March 26, 1984

== Regular season ==
=== Season standings ===
Midwest Division	W	L	PCT	GB	Home	Road	Div
y-Utah Jazz	45	37	.549	–	31–10	14–27	15–15
x-Dallas Mavericks	43	39	.524	2	31–10	12–29	19–11
x-Denver Nuggets	38	44	.463	7	27–14	11–30	16–14
x-Kansas City Kings	38	44	.463	7	26–15	12–29	16–14
San Antonio Spurs	37	45	.451	8	28–13	9–32	14–16
Houston Rockets	29	53	.354	16	21–20	8–33	9–21

#	Western Conference				
#	Team	W	L	PCT	GB
1	c-Los Angeles Lakers	54	28	.659	–
2	y-Utah Jazz	45	37	.549	9
3	x-Portland Trail Blazers	48	34	.585	6
4	x-Dallas Mavericks	43	39	.524	11
5	x-Seattle SuperSonics	42	40	.512	12
6	x-Phoenix Suns	41	41	.500	13
7	x-Denver Nuggets	38	44	.463	16
8	x-Kansas City Kings	38	44	.463	16
9	San Antonio Spurs	37	45	.451	17
10	Golden State Warriors	37	45	.451	17
11	San Diego Clippers	30	52	.366	24
12	Houston Rockets	29	53	.354	25

z - clinched division title
y - clinched division title
x - clinched playoff spot

== Player statistics ==
=== Regular season ===
Player	POS	GP	GS	MP	REB	AST	STL	BLK	PTS	MPG	RPG	APG	SPG	BPG	PPG
Edgar Jones	PF	81	33	1,770	449	85	64	107	826	21.9	5.5	1.0	.8	1.3	10.2
Gene Banks	PF	80	66	2,600	582	254	105	23	1,049	32.5	7.3	3.2	1.3	.3	13.1
Mike Mitchell	SF	79	79	2,853	570	93	62	73	1,839	36.1	7.2	1.2	.8	.9	23.3
Fred Roberts	PF	79	8	1,531	304	98	52	38	573	19.4	3.8	1.2	.7	.5	7.3
George Gervin	SG	76	76	2,584	313	220	79	47	1,967	34.0	4.1	2.9	1.0	.6	25.9
Mark McNamara	C	70	3	1,037	317	31	14	12	388	14.8	4.5	.4	.2	.2	5.5
Artis Gilmore	C	64	59	2,034	662	70	36	132	982	31.8	10.3	1.1	.6	2.1	15.3
John Lucas II	PG	63	39	1,807	180	673	92	5	689	28.7	2.9	10.7	1.5	.1	10.9
Johnny Moore	PG	59	42	1,650	178	566	123	20	595	28.0	3.0	9.6	2.1	.3	10.1
John Paxson	PG	49	0	458	33	149	10	2	142	9.3	.7	3.0	.2	.0	2.9
Ron Brewer^{†}	SG	40	5	782	50	44	18	16	348	19.6	1.3	1.1	.5	.4	8.7
Keith Edmonson^{†}	SG	40	0	521	70	27	22	6	346	13.0	1.8	.7	.6	.2	8.7
Kevin Williams	SG	19	0	200	13	43	8	4	75	10.5	.7	2.3	.4	.2	3.9
Brant Weidner	PF	8	0	38	11	0	0	2	8	4.8	1.4	.0	.0	.3	1.0
Dave Robisch^{†}	C	4	0	37	8	1	0	0	8	9.3	2.0	.3	.0	.0	2.0
Dave Batton	C	4	0	31	4	3	0	3	10	7.8	1.0	.8	.0	.8	2.5
Steve Lingenfelter	PF	3	0	14	4	1	0	0	2	4.7	1.3	.3	.0	.0	.7
Roger Phegley^{†}	SG	3	0	11	2	2	0	0	7	3.7	.7	.7	.0	.0	2.3
Darrell Lockhart	C	2	0	14	3	0	0	0	4	7.0	1.5	.0	.0	.0	2.0
Bob Miller	PF	2	0	8	5	1	0	1	4	4.0	2.5	.5	.0	.5	2.0

- ^{†} Denotes player spent time with another team in the season. Stats reflect time with the Spurs only.

== See also ==
- 1983-84 NBA season
