= 1983–84 San Diego Clippers season =

NBA professional basketball team season

- Head coach: Jim Lynam
- Arena: San Diego Sports Arena

Results
- Record: 30–52 (.366)
- Place: Division: 6th (Pacific); Conference: 11th (Western)
- Playoff finish: Did not qualify
- Stats at Basketball Reference

Local media
- Television: XETV
- Radio: KPQP

The 1983–84 San Diego Clippers season was the Clippers' 14th season in the NBA and their sixth and final season in San Diego as the team moved to the city of Los Angeles.

== Draft picks ==
Round	Pick	Player	Position	Nationality	School/Club team
1	4	Byron Scott	Guard	United States	Arizona State
5	97	Manute Bol	Center	Sudan	
7	143	Dan Evans	Forward	United States	Oregon State
8	166	Mark Gannon	Forward	United States	Iowa
9	188	David Maxwell	Guard	United States	Fordham
10	209	Keith Smith	Guard	United States	San Diego State

== Roster ==
1983–84 San Diego Clippers roster
Players

Pos.	No.	Player	Height	Weight	DOB	From
F	7	Michael Brooks	6 ft 7 in (2.01 m)	220 lb (100 kg)		La Salle
F	34	Terry Cummings	6 ft 9 in (2.06 m)	220 lb (100 kg)		DePaul
C	40	James Donaldson	7 ft 2 in (2.18 m)	278 lb (126 kg)		Washington State
G	24	Craig Hodges	6 ft 3 in (1.91 m)	185 lb (84 kg)		Long Beach State
F	22	Hutch Jones	6 ft 8 in (2.03 m)	196 lb (89 kg)		Vanderbilt
F	20	Greg Kelser	6 ft 7 in (2.01 m)	205 lb (93 kg)		Michigan State
G	9	Kevin Loder	6 ft 6 in (1.98 m)	205 lb (93 kg)		Alabama State
F	8	Hank McDowell	6 ft 9 in (2.06 m)	215 lb (98 kg)		Memphis
G	1	Billy McKinney	6 ft 0 in (1.83 m)	170 lb (77 kg)		Northwestern
G	10	Norm Nixon	6 ft 2 in (1.88 m)	170 lb (77 kg)		Duquesne
G	25	Ricky Pierce	6 ft 4 in (1.93 m)	222 lb (101 kg)		Rice
G	18	Derek Smith	6 ft 6 in (1.98 m)	218 lb (99 kg)		Louisville
F	9	Linton Townes	6 ft 7 in (2.01 m)	195 lb (88 kg)		James Madison
C	32	Bill Walton	6 ft 11 in (2.11 m)	235 lb (107 kg)		UCLA
F	12	Rory White	6 ft 8 in (2.03 m)	215 lb (98 kg)		South Alabama
C	33	Jerome Whitehead	6 ft 10 in (2.08 m)	220 lb (100 kg)		Marquette

Coaches
Head coach
- Jim Lynam
Assistant(s)
- Don Casey
- Don Chaney

Legend
- (DP) Unsigned draft pick
- (FA) Free agent
- (S) Suspended
- Injured

== Regular season ==
=== Season standings ===
Pacific Division	W	L	PCT	GB	Home	Road	Div
y-Los Angeles Lakers	54	28	.659	–	28–13	26–15	18–12
x-Portland Trail Blazers	48	34	.585	6	33–8	15–26	17–13
x-Seattle SuperSonics	42	40	.512	12	32–9	10–31	14–16
x-Phoenix Suns	41	41	.500	13	31–10	10–31	16–14
Golden State Warriors	37	45	.451	17	27–14	10–31	13–17
San Diego Clippers	30	52	.366	24	25–16	5–36	12–18

#	Western Conference				
#	Team	W	L	PCT	GB
1	c-Los Angeles Lakers	54	28	.659	–
2	y-Utah Jazz	45	37	.549	9
3	x-Portland Trail Blazers	48	34	.585	6
4	x-Dallas Mavericks	43	39	.524	11
5	x-Seattle SuperSonics	42	40	.512	12
6	x-Phoenix Suns	41	41	.500	13
7	x-Denver Nuggets	38	44	.463	16
8	x-Kansas City Kings	38	44	.463	16
9	San Antonio Spurs	37	45	.451	17
10	Golden State Warriors	37	45	.451	17
11	San Diego Clippers	30	52	.366	24
12	Houston Rockets	29	53	.354	25

Notes

- z, y – division champions
- x – clinched playoff spot

== Player statistics ==
Legend
GP	Games played	GS	Games started	MPG	Minutes per game
FG%	Field-goal percentage	3P%	3-point field-goal percentage	FT%	Free-throw percentage
RPG	Rebounds per game	APG	Assists per game	SPG	Steals per game
BPG	Blocks per game	PPG	Points per game

Player	GP	GS	MPG	FG%	3FG%	FT%	RPG	APG	SPG	BPG	PPG
Michael Brooks	47	30	29.9	.479	.000	.689	7.3	1.9	1.1	0.3	11.3
Terry Cummings	81	80	35.9	.494	.000	.720	9.6	1.7	1.1	0.7	22.9
James Donaldson	82	67	30.8	.596		.761	7.9	1.1	0.5	1.7	11.8
Craig Hodges	76	28	20.7	.450	.217	.750	1.1	1.5	0.8	0.0	7.8
Hutch Jones	4	0	4.5	.000		.250	0.0	0.0	0.3	0.0	0.3
Greg Kelser	80	21	22.3	.519	.333	.702	4.9	1.1	0.9	0.4	11.0
Kevin Loder	1	0	4.0				0.0	0.0	0.0	0.0	0.0
Hank McDowell	57	0	10.7	.431	.000	.679	2.7	0.6	0.2	0.0	3.6
Billy McKinney	80	0	10.5	.446	.000	.848	0.7	2.0	0.3	0.0	3.9
Norm Nixon	82	82	37.2	.462	.239	.760	2.5	11.1	1.1	0.0	17.0
Ricky Pierce	69	35	18.6	.470	.000	.861	2.0	0.9	0.4	0.2	9.9
Derek Smith	61	20	21.3	.546	.167	.755	2.8	1.3	0.5	0.4	9.8
Linton Townes	2	0	8.5	.429			0.5	0.5	0.5	1.0	3.0
Bill Walton	55	46	26.8	.556	.000	.597	8.7	3.3	0.8	1.6	12.1
Rory White	6	0	3.2	.444			0.7	0.0	0.0	0.0	1.3
Jerome Whitehead	70	1	13.2	.490		.822	3.5	0.3	0.2	.2	5.4

== Transactions ==
The Clippers were involved in the following transactions during the 1983–84 season.

=== Trades ===
August 18, 1983
To San Diego Clippers

- James Donaldson, Greg Kelser, Mark Radford, 1984 first-round draft pick & 1985 second-round draft pick
To Seattle SuperSonics

- Tom Chambers, Al Wood, 1987 second-round draft pick & 1984 third-round draft pick
October 4, 1983
To San Diego Clippers

- Billy McKinney
To Denver Nuggets

- Richard Anderson
October 10, 1983
To San Diego Clippers

- Norm Nixon, Eddie Jordan & two future second-round draft picks
To Los Angeles Lakers

- Swen Nater & draft rights to Byron Scott
October 17, 1983
To San Diego Clippers

- Ricky Pierce
To Detroit Pistons

- 1986 & 1987 second-round draft picks
October 26, 1983
To San Diego Clippers

- Hank McDowell
To Indiana Pacers

- 1986 third-round draft pick

=== Free agents ===
==== Additions ====
Player	Signed	Former team
Derek Smith	9/13/83	Golden State Warriors
Hutch Jones	12/7/83	Albuquerque Silvers
Linton Townes	12/23/83	Milwaukee Bucks
Kevin Loder	2/18/84	Kansas City Kings
Rory White	3/9/84	Milwaukee Bucks

==== Subtractions ====
Player	Left	New team
Joe Cooper	8/9/83	Seattle SuperSonics
Hutch Jones	12/20/83	Wyoming Wildcatters
Linton Townes	1/11/84	San Antonio Spurs
