= 1983–84 Portland Trail Blazers season =

NBA professional basketball team season

- Head coach: Jack Ramsay
- General manager: Stu Inman
- Owner: Larry Weinberg
- Arena: Memorial Coliseum

Results
- Record: 48–34 (.585)
- Place: Division: 2nd (Pacific); Conference: 3rd (Western)
- Playoff finish: First round (lost to Suns 2–3)
- Stats at Basketball Reference

Local media
- Television: KOIN
- Radio: KEX

The 1983–84 Portland Trail Blazers season was the 14th season of the franchise in the National Basketball Association (NBA).

The season is memorable when the Blazers drafted Clyde Drexler with the 14th pick of the 1983 NBA draft.

== Offseason ==
=== NBA draft ===
Note: This is not a complete list; only the first two rounds are covered, as well as any other picks by the franchise who played at least one NBA game.

Round	Pick	Player	Position	Nationality	School/Club team
1	14	Clyde Drexler	G	United States	Houston

== Roster ==
Portland Trail Blazers roster
Players

Pos.	No.	Player	Height	Weight	DOB	From
F	34	Kenny Carr	6 ft 7 in (2.01 m)	220 lb (100 kg)		NC State
F/C	42	Wayne Cooper	6 ft 10 in (2.08 m)	220 lb (100 kg)		New Orleans
G	22	Clyde Drexler	6 ft 7 in (2.01 m)	210 lb (95 kg)		Houston
F	3	Jeff Lamp	6 ft 6 in (1.98 m)	195 lb (88 kg)		Virginia
G	12	Fat Lever	6 ft 3 in (1.91 m)	170 lb (77 kg)		Arizona State
F	33	Calvin Natt	6 ft 6 in (1.98 m)	220 lb (100 kg)		Louisiana–Monroe
C	24	Audie Norris	6 ft 9 in (2.06 m)	230 lb (104 kg)		Jackson State
G	4	Jim Paxson	6 ft 6 in (1.98 m)	200 lb (91 kg)		Dayton
C	54	Tom Piotrowski	7 ft 1 in (2.16 m)	240 lb (109 kg)		La Salle
F/C	43	Mychal Thompson	6 ft 10 in (2.08 m)	226 lb (103 kg)		Minnesota
G	14	Darnell Valentine	6 ft 1 in (1.85 m)	183 lb (83 kg)		Kansas
F	31	Pete Verhoeven	6 ft 9 in (2.06 m)	215 lb (98 kg)		Fresno State

Coaches
Head coach
- Jack Ramsay (Saint Joseph's)
Assistant(s)
- Rick Adelman (Loyola Marymount)
- Bucky Buckwalter (Utah)

Legend
- (DP) Unsigned draft pick
- (FA) Free agent
- (S) Suspended
- Injured

== Regular season ==
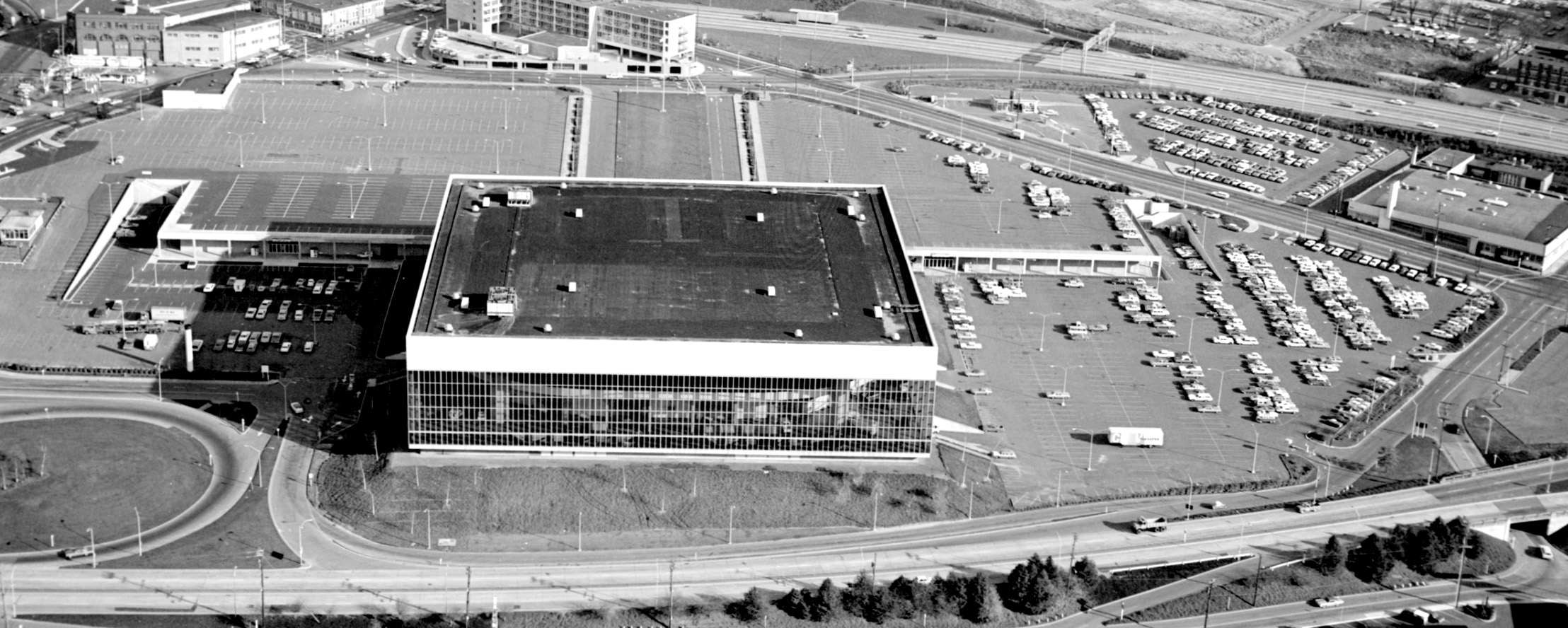
The Trail Blazers played their home games at Veterans Memorial Coliseum.

=== Season standings ===
Pacific Division	W	L	PCT	GB	Home	Road	Div
y-Los Angeles Lakers	54	28	.659	–	28–13	26–15	18–12
x-Portland Trail Blazers	48	34	.585	6	33–8	15–26	17–13
x-Seattle SuperSonics	42	40	.512	12	32–9	10–31	14–16
x-Phoenix Suns	41	41	.500	13	31–10	10–31	16–14
Golden State Warriors	37	45	.451	17	27–14	10–31	13–17
San Diego Clippers	30	52	.366	24	25–16	5–36	12–18

#	Western Conference				
#	Team	W	L	PCT	GB
1	c-Los Angeles Lakers	54	28	.659	–
2	y-Utah Jazz	45	37	.549	9
3	x-Portland Trail Blazers	48	34	.585	6
4	x-Dallas Mavericks	43	39	.524	11
5	x-Seattle SuperSonics	42	40	.512	12
6	x-Phoenix Suns	41	41	.500	13
7	x-Denver Nuggets	38	44	.463	16
8	x-Kansas City Kings	38	44	.463	16
9	San Antonio Spurs	37	45	.451	17
10	Golden State Warriors	37	45	.451	17
11	San Diego Clippers	30	52	.366	24
12	Houston Rockets	29	53	.354	25

Notes

- z, y – division champions
- x – clinched playoff spot

== Playoffs ==
1984 playoff game log
First round: 2–3 (home: 1–2; road: 1–1)

Game	Date	Team	Score	High points	High rebounds	High assists	Location Attendance	Series
1	April 18	Phoenix	L 106–113	Kenny Carr (24)	Calvin Natt (9)	Thompson, Valentine (6)	Memorial Coliseum; 12,666	0–1
2	April 20	Phoenix	W 122–116	Jim Paxson (27)	Mychal Thompson (13)	Darnell Valentine (8)	Memorial Coliseum; 12,666	1–1
3	April 22	@ Phoenix	L 103–106	Darnell Valentine (29)	Thompson, Carr (8)	Darnell Valentine (10)	Arizona Veterans Memorial Coliseum; 11,531	1–2
4	April 24	@ Phoenix	W 113–110	Calvin Natt (30)	Calvin Natt (8)	Darnell Valentine (13)	Arizona Veterans Memorial Coliseum; 14,660	2–2
5	April 26	Phoenix	L 105–117	Jim Paxson (24)	Natt, Drexler (10)	Darnell Valentine (5)	Memorial Coliseum; 12,666	2–3

1984 schedule

== Player statistics ==
Legend
GP	Games played	GS	Games started	MPG	Minutes per game
FG%	Field-goal percentage	3P%	3-point field-goal percentage	FT%	Free-throw percentage
RPG	Rebounds per game	APG	Assists per game	SPG	Steals per game
BPG	Blocks per game	PPG	Points per game

=== Season ===
Player	GP	GS	MPG	FG%	3FG%	FT%	RPG	APG	SPG	BPG	PPG

=== Playoffs ===
Player	GP	GS	MPG	FG%	3FG%	FT%	RPG	APG	SPG	BPG	PPG

== Awards and records ==
=== Awards ===
- Jim Paxson, All-NBA Second Team

== Transactions ==
=== Free agents ===
==== Additions ====
Player	Signed	Former team

==== Subtractions ====
Player	Left	New team

== See also ==
- 1983–84 NBA season
