= Scott Wedman =

American basketball player (born 1952)

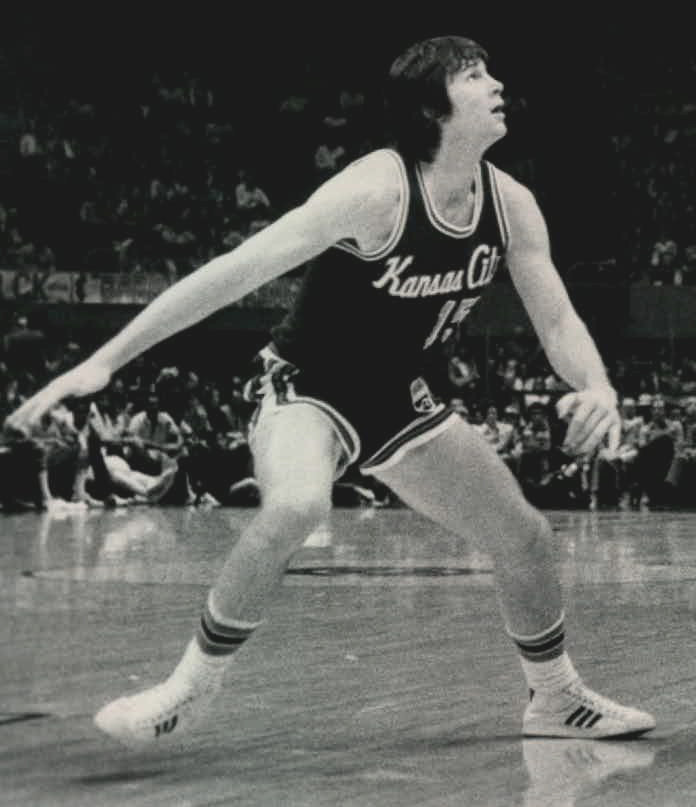
- Wedman in 1976

Personal information
- Born: July 29, 1952 (age 74) Harper, Kansas, U.S.
- Listed height: 6 ft 7 in (2.01 m)
- Listed weight: 215 lb (98 kg)

Career information
- High school: Mullen (Denver, Colorado)
- College: Colorado (1971–1974)
- NBA draft: 1974: 1st round, 6th overall pick
- Drafted by: Kansas City–Omaha Kings
- Playing career: 1974–1986
- Position: Small forward
- Number: 15, 8, 20

Career history
- 1974–1981: Kansas City–Omaha / Kansas City Kings
- 1981–1983: Cleveland Cavaliers
- 1983–1986: Boston Celtics

Career highlights
- 2× NBA champion (1984, 1986); 2× NBA All-Star (1976, 1980); NBA All-Defensive Second Team (1980); NBA All-Rookie First Team (1975); 2× First-team All-Big Eight (1973, 1974)

Career statistics
- Points: 11,196 (13.2 ppg)
- Rebounds: 4,355 (4.8 rpg)
- Assists: 1,771 (2.0 apg)
- Stats at NBA.com
- Stats at Basketball Reference

Scott Dean Wedman (born July 29, 1952) is an American former professional basketball player who played thirteen seasons in the National Basketball Association (NBA). He was drafted by the Kansas City-Omaha Kings with the sixth pick in the first round in the 1974 NBA draft from Colorado and was a two-time NBA champion and two-time NBA All-Star.

== Early life ==
Wedman was born in Harper, Kansas, the son of Tom and Georgia Wedman. He lived on a 100-acre farm. His father, Tom, was a Boeing engineer, farm equipment manufacturer and car dealer. His family moved to Denver, Colorado before moving back to Kansas. His older brother, Mike, was a national class pole vaulter and decathlete at the University of Colorado.

Scott was a member of the 4-H club and participated in all aspects of farm life. Though undersized and a late bloomer, Wedman excelled at basketball, also at the University of Colorado. Wedman's parents encouraged the strict dietary regimen that he has carried with him his entire life.

When he was twelve years old, Wedman's midget-league basketball team won the city championship. Wedman was not a varsity starter until his Senior year, when a growth spurt invigorated his game. He averaged 19 points a game and made All-State at Mullen High School in Denver. He was recruited heavily by both the University of Wyoming and the University of Colorado.

== College career (1970–1974) ==
Wedman played collegiality for the Colorado Buffaloes, following his brother Mike to the school. Wedman played for Coach Sox Walseth, scoring 1,251 career points and averaging 16.7 per game. He graduated in 1974, leaving as CU's fourth all-time leading scorer and rebounder. Wedman was twice an All-Big Eight Conference selection and lead Colorado in scoring as a junior (17.7 per game) and as a senior (20.0). Wedman was selected as a first-team All Big Eight as a junior and senior later was named to the Big 8 Conference all-decade team for the 1970s.

== NBA career ==
=== Kansas City/Omaha Kings (1974–1981) ===
Wedman was the 2nd overall pick in the 1974 ABA draft by the Memphis Tams of the American Basketball Association and the 6th overall pick of the Kansas City Kings in the 1974 NBA draft. Wedman signed with the Kings.

Wedman was a proficient shooter for the Kings playing under coaches Phil Johnson and Cotton Fitzsimmons and alongside Tiny Archibald and Otis Birdsong among others. He represented the Kansas City Kings twice in the NBA All-Star Game. During his time in Kansas City, Wedman gained the nickname "The Incredible Hulk" because of his extensive sessions in the weight room. On March 4, 1979, Wedman was involved in a 1-car accident in which his Porsche overturned on a rainy highway in Kansas City. At the time, doctors credited his conditioning with keeping him out of action for only a few games.

He hit a career summit in 1979–80 and 1980–81, with a scoring average of 19.0 points per game. On January 2, 1980, he scored 45 points in an overtime win at Utah for his career high. Wedman was a key to Kansas City's postseason success in 1981. Despite finishing the regular season with only a 40–42 record, the Kings caught fire in the playoffs, beating Portland 2–1 and Phoenix 4–3 before losing 1–4 to Houston in the Western Conference finals.

At the 1981 NBA draft, seeing that the Kings could not afford to keep both Wedman and fellow All-Star Otis Birdsong, Kansas City traded Birdsong and let Wedman sign with Cleveland.

A small forward, Wedman averaged 34.7 minutes, 16.5 points, 6.0 rebounds and 2.3 assists and 1.2 steals in 547 games for the Kings over seven seasons, shooting 80% from the line, 49.0% from the field and 32.3% from three (after the 3-point line was introduced in 1979).

=== Cleveland Cavaliers (1981–1983) ===
Signing a 1 million dollar contract as a free agent, Wedman's scoring initially declined, as he averaged 10.9 points per game in 1981–82, playing 30 minutes per game in 54 games for the Cavaliers.

On January 14, 1983, Wedman, averaging 18.1 points in 36 minutes over 35 games, was traded by the Cleveland Cavaliers to the Boston Celtics for Darren Tillis and cash.

Overall, Wedman averaged 13.8 points in 89 games and 32.9 minutes for Cleveland, shooting 78% from the line, 46% from the field and 31.1% on three-point shots.

=== Boston Celtics (1983–1986) ===
In Boston, he was instrumental as a player off the bench in the Celtics' NBA championships in 1984 and 1986, playing under KC Jones.

While in Boston, Wedman joined Naismith Basketball Hall of Fame inductee Bill Walton in coming off the Celtics bench, on a roster that included Hall of Famers Larry Bird, Kevin McHale, Dennis Johnson, Robert Parish, Tiny Archibald, as well as Quinn Buckner, Danny Ainge and Cedric Maxwell.

Boston fans remember Wedman's performance in the Memorial Day Massacre, an appellation for Game 1 of the 1985 NBA Finals. Coming off the bench, Wedman hit all 11 of his shots, including four three-pointers, in Boston's 148–114 win over the Lakers. He often spelled Larry Bird and Kevin McHale or replaced them when they were injured.

Wedman was a strict vegetarian during his playing career, not for any moral reasons but for health purposes. For this, Wedman was teased mercilessly by both Bird and McHale in practices and at meals.

"He was a vital piece of our team. He knew that players like Larry and Kevin were going to get their minutes, and he accepted his role without hesitation," said Celtics Coach KC Jones about Wedman's tenure in Boston. "He had the perfect attitude. As a coach, you couldn’t ask for anything more. He was an important piece of two championship teams."

Wedman averaged 14.9 minutes in his five seasons in Boston, shooting 47.2% from the floor and 35.5% on three-pointers, averaging 6.2 points and 2.1 rebounds.

=== Seattle SuperSonics ===
On October 16, 1987, he was traded by the Celtics with Sam Vincent to the Seattle SuperSonics for a 1989 second-round draft choice. However, he retired and did not play a game for the SuperSonics.

For his career, Wedman played 906 games in thirteen seasons and averaged 13.2 points, 4.8 rebounds and 2.0 assists, shooting 48.5% from the floor, 79.4% from the line and 33.5% on three-points.

== Post-playing career ==
He coached the now-defunct Kansas City Knights of the American Basketball Association.

Wedman returned to Kansas City where he lives today and operates his real estate business.

In June 2007, Wedman was named head coach of the Great Falls Explorers of the CBA.

== Honors ==
- Wedman was inducted into the Colorado Sports Hall of Fame in 2007.
- In 2015, Wedman was inducted into the Colorado University Athletic Hall Of Fame.
- Wedman was inducted into the Pac-12 Conference Hall of Honor in 2016.

== NBA career statistics ==
Legend
GP	Games played	GS	Games started	MPG	Minutes per game
FG%	Field goal percentage	3P%	3-point field goal percentage	FT%	Free throw percentage
RPG	Rebounds per game	APG	Assists per game	SPG	Steals per game
BPG	Blocks per game	PPG	Points per game	**Bold**	Career high
†	Won an NBA championship

=== Regular season ===
Year	Team	GP	GS	MPG	FG%	3P%	FT%	RPG	APG	SPG	BPG	PPG
1974–75	Kansas City–Omaha	80		31.9	.465		.818	6.1	1.6	1.0	.3	11.1
1975–76	Kansas City	**82**		36.2	.456		.780	**7.4**	2.4	1.3	.4	15.5
1976–77	Kansas City	81		33.9	.460		.855	6.2	**2.8**	1.2	.3	15.4
1977–78	Kansas City	81		36.6	.509		**.870**	5.7	2.5	1.2	.3	17.7
1978–79	Kansas City	73		34.2	**.534**		.797	5.3	2.0	1.0	.4	18.3
1979–80	Kansas City	68		34.5	.512	.318	.801	5.7	2.1	1.2	**.7**	**19.0**
1980–81	Kansas City	81		35.8	.477	.325	.686	5.3	**2.8**	1.2	.6	**19.0**
1981–82	Cleveland	54	**39**	30.3	.441	.217	.733	5.6	2.5	**1.4**	.3	10.9
1982–83	Cleveland	35	35	**36.9**	.480	.409	.844	5.9	2.5	.7	.3	18.1
1982–83	Boston	40	0	12.6	.459	.100	.667	1.9	.8	.5	.2	5.2
1983–84†	Boston	68	5	13.5	.444	.154	.829	2.0	1.0	.4	.1	4.8
1984–85	Boston	78	5	14.4	.478	**.500**	.764	2.0	1.2	.3	.1	6.4
1985–86†	Boston	79	19	17.7	.473	.354	.662	2.4	1.1	.5	.3	8.0
1986–87	Boston	6	2	13.0	.333	**.500**	.500	1.5	1.0	.3	.3	3.3
Career		906	105	28.6	.481	.335	.794	4.8	2.0	.9	.3	13.2
All-Star		1	0	20.0	.800	.000	.000	6.0	2.0	1.0	.0	8.0

=== Playoffs ===
Year	Team	GP	GS	MPG	FG%	3P%	FT%	RPG	APG	SPG	BPG	PPG
1975	Kansas City–Omaha	6		38.3	.397		.667	5.8	2.7	1.0	.5	11.0
1979	Kansas City	5		34.8	.462		**.750**	**7.4**	1.8	**1.8**	.6	19.2
1980	Kansas City	3		38.7	.453	**.667**	.727	7.0	3.0	.3	**1.0**	**22.7**
1981	Kansas City	15		**43.8**	.434	.281	.714	5.8	**3.9**	1.2	.5	20.5
1983	Boston	6		11.0	**.583**	.000	.500	2.3	.0	.2	.0	4.8
1984†	Boston	17		13.3	.417	.571	.500	2.8	1.0	.4	.0	5.2
1985	Boston	**21**	**1**	16.7	.545	.455	.684	2.8	1.6	.6	.0	8.7
1986†	Boston	12	0	11.8	.392	.500	**.750**	1.8	.7	.8	.3	3.8
Career		85	1	23.1	.453	.386	.696	3.8	1.8	.7	.2	10.4
