= Triple Crown (American basketball) =

Championship accomplishment

In American men's basketball, the Triple Crown is the achievement of an individual player winning an NCAA championship, NBA championship, and Olympic gold medal during his career. Eight players have accomplished this feat:

Player	NCAA championships	NBA championships	Olympic gold medals	Ref
Clyde Lovellette	Kansas Jayhawks (1952)	Minneapolis Lakers (1954); Boston Celtics (1963, 1964)	Team USA (1952)	
Bill Russell	San Francisco Dons (1955, 1956)	Boston Celtics (1957, 1959–1966, 1968, 1969)	Team USA (1956)	
K.C. Jones	San Francisco Dons (1955, 1956)	Boston Celtics (1959–1966)	Team USA (1956)	
Jerry Lucas	Ohio State Buckeyes (1960)	New York Knicks (1973)	Team USA (1960)	
Quinn Buckner	Indiana Hoosiers (1976)	Boston Celtics (1984)	Team USA (1976)	
Magic Johnson	Michigan State Spartans (1979)	Los Angeles Lakers (1980, 1982, 1985, 1987, 1988)	Team USA (1992)	
Michael Jordan	North Carolina Tar Heels (1982)	Chicago Bulls (1991–1993, 1996–1998)	Team USA (1984, 1992)	
Anthony Davis	Kentucky Wildcats (2012)	Los Angeles Lakers (2020)	Team USA (2012, 2024)	

== Details ==
Clyde Lovellette was the first Triple Crown winner, completing the trifecta over a two-year span with a college championship and Olympic gold medal in 1952 followed by an NBA title in 1954. K.C. Jones and Bill Russell were teammates on championship teams in college (San Francisco Dons), the NBA (Boston Celtics) and the Olympics (Team USA) and they are the only ones who also won championships as a head coach; Lovellette joined them on the 1963–64 Celtics title-winning squad. Quinn Buckner, Jerry Lucas, and Magic Johnson also won a high school basketball state championship.
