= Carlos Clark =

American basketball player (born 1960)

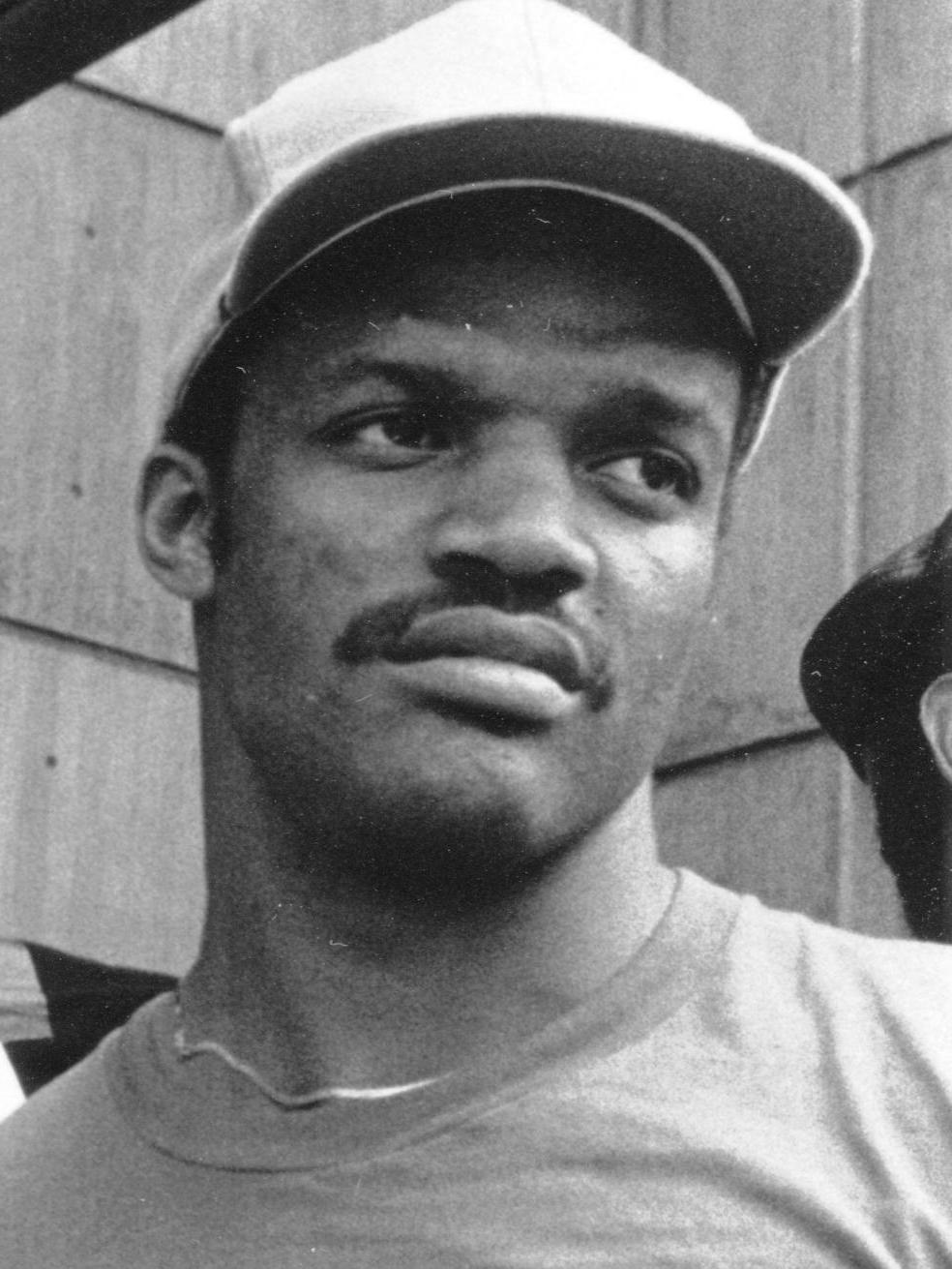

Personal information
- Born: August 10, 1960 (age 66) Somerville, Tennessee, U.S.
- Listed height: 6 ft 4 in (1.93 m)
- Listed weight: 210 lb (95 kg)

Career information
- High school: Fayette-Ware (Somerville, Tennessee)
- College: Ole Miss (1979–1983)
- NBA draft: 1983: 4th round, 91st overall pick
- Drafted by: Boston Celtics
- Playing career: 1983–1990
- Position: Shooting guard
- Number: 40

Career history
- 1983–1985: Boston Celtics
- 1985–1986: Evansville Thunder
- 1986: Tampa Bay Flash
- 1986–1991: La Crosse Catbirds
- 1987: Tampa Bay Stars
- 1988–1989, 1990: Calgary 88's

Career highlights
- NBA champion (1984); CBA champion (1990); All-CBA Second Team (1987); CBA All-Defensive Team (1990); CBA All-Defensive Second Team (1987); 2× First-team All-SEC (1982, 1983)
- Stats at NBA.com
- Stats at Basketball Reference

Carlos R. Clark (born August 10, 1960) is an American former professional basketball player.

A 6'4" shooting guard from the University of Mississippi, Clark played two seasons (1983–1985) in the National Basketball Association with the Boston Celtics. He averaged 2.4 points per game and won a championship with the Celtics in 1984.

After being waived by the Celtics in 1986, Clark played in the Continental Basketball Association (CBA), the World Basketball League (WBL), the Philippine Basketball Association (PBA) and in Belgium where he was a key member of Bobcat Gent when they won the Belgian Cup in 1992. He won a CBA championship with the La Crosse Catbirds in 1990. He was selected to the All-CBA Second Team in 1987, All-Defensive Team in 1990 and All-Defensive Second Team in 1987.

== Career statistics ==
Legend
GP	Games played	GS	Games started	MPG	Minutes per game
FG%	Field goal percentage	3P%	3-point field goal percentage	FT%	Free throw percentage
RPG	Rebounds per game	APG	Assists per game	SPG	Steals per game
BPG	Blocks per game	PPG	Points per game	**Bold**	Career high

=== NBA ===
==== Regular season ====
Year	Team	GP	GS	MPG	FG%	3P%	FT%	RPG	APG	SPG	BPG	PPG
1983–84†	Boston	31	0	4.1	.365	.000	**.889**	.5	.5	.3	.0	1.7
1984–85	Boston	**62**	**3**	**9.1**	**.421**	.000	.774	**1.1**	**.8**	**.6**	.0	**2.7**
Career		93	3	7.4	.407	.000	.803	.9	.7	.5	.0	2.4

==== Playoffs ====
Year	Team	GP	GS	MPG	FG%	3P%	FT%	RPG	APG	SPG	BPG	PPG
1984†	Boston	**8**		2.5	.400	–	.500	.1	.1	.1	**.3**	1.1
1985	Boston	3	0	**3.7**	**.600**	–	**1.000**	**.7**	**1.0**	**.3**	.0	**2.7**
Career		11	0	2.8	.467	–	.750	.3	.4	.2	.2	1.5
