= 1983–84 Boston Celtics season =

NBA basketball team season (won championship)

- NBA champions
- Conference champions
- Division champions
- Head coach: K. C. Jones
- General manager: Red Auerbach
- Owners: Don Gaston; Alan N. Cohen; Paul Dupee
- Arena: Boston Garden; Hartford Civic Center

Results
- Record: 62–20 (.756)
- Place: Division: 1st (Atlantic); Conference: 1st (Eastern)
- Playoff finish: NBA champions (Defeated Lakers 4–3)
- Stats at Basketball Reference

Local media
- Television: SportsChannel New England, WBZ, WTXX
- Radio: WRKO, WTIC

The 1983–84 Boston Celtics were champions of the National Basketball Association (NBA) for the 15th time in franchise history, led by regular season and finals MVP Larry Bird.

In the playoffs, the Celtics defeated the Washington Bullets in the First Round in three games, defeated the New York Knicks in the Semi-finals in seven games, and defeated the Milwaukee Bucks in the Conference Finals in five games, advancing to the NBA Finals. In the Finals, the Celtics faced their long time rival, the Los Angeles Lakers, the first time the two teams faced off against each other since 1969 in which the Celtics won 4–3, and the first time the two teams met in the Finals in the 1980s. The Celtics would go on to defeat the Lakers in seven games, winning their fifteenth NBA championship, and extending their NBA Finals victories over the Lakers to 8. HoopsHype would later rank this squad as the team with the 15th easiest route to the NBA Finals championship, primarily due to the record of the Washington Bullets in the first round.

== Offseason ==
=== NBA draft ===
Round	Pick	Player	Position	Nationality	School/Club team
1	21	Greg Kite	Center	United States	BYU

== Roster ==
Boston Celtics roster
Players

Pos.	No.	Player	Height	Weight	DOB	From
G	44	Danny Ainge	6 ft 4 in (1.93 m)	175 lb (79 kg)		BYU
F	33	Larry Bird	6 ft 9 in (2.06 m)	220 lb (100 kg)		Indiana State
G	28	Quinn Buckner	6 ft 3 in (1.91 m)	190 lb (86 kg)		Indiana
F	30	M. L. Carr	6 ft 6 in (1.98 m)	205 lb (93 kg)		Guilford
G	40	Carlos Clark	6 ft 4 in (1.93 m)	210 lb (95 kg)		Mississippi
G	43	Gerald Henderson	6 ft 2 in (1.88 m)	175 lb (79 kg)		VCU
G	3	Dennis Johnson	6 ft 4 in (1.93 m)	185 lb (84 kg)		Pepperdine
C	50	Greg Kite	6 ft 11 in (2.11 m)	250 lb (113 kg)		BYU
F	31	Cedric Maxwell	6 ft 8 in (2.03 m)	205 lb (93 kg)		Charlotte
F	32	Kevin McHale	6 ft 10 in (2.08 m)	210 lb (95 kg)		Minnesota
C	00	Robert Parish	7 ft 0 in (2.13 m)	230 lb (104 kg)		Centenary
F	8	Scott Wedman	6 ft 7 in (2.01 m)	215 lb (98 kg)		Colorado

Coaches
Head coach
- K. C. Jones
Assistant(s)
- Chris Ford
- Jimmy Rodgers

Legend
- (DP) Unsigned draft pick
- (FA) Free agent
- (S) Suspended
- Injured

== Regular season ==
=== Season standings ===
Atlantic Division	W	L	PCT	GB	Home	Road	Div
y-Boston Celtics	62	20	.756	–	33–8	29–12	13–11
x-Philadelphia 76ers	52	30	.634	10	32–9	20–21	15–9
x-New York Knicks	47	35	.573	15	29–12	18–23	12–12
x-New Jersey Nets	45	37	.549	17	29–12	16–25	12–12
x-Washington Bullets	35	47	.427	27	25–16	10–31	8–16

#	Eastern Conference				
#	Team	W	L	PCT	GB
1	z-Boston Celtics	62	20	.756	–
2	y-Milwaukee Bucks	50	32	.610	12
3	x-Philadelphia 76ers	52	30	.634	10
4	x-Detroit Pistons	49	33	.598	13
5	x-New York Knicks	47	35	.573	15
6	x-New Jersey Nets	45	37	.549	17
7	x-Atlanta Hawks	40	42	.488	22
8	x-Washington Bullets	35	47	.427	27
9	Cleveland Cavaliers	28	54	.341	34
10	Chicago Bulls	27	55	.329	35
11	Indiana Pacers	26	56	.317	36

z – clinched division title
y – clinched division title
x – clinched playoff spot

== Game log ==
=== Regular season ===
1983–84 game log
Total: 62–20 (Home: 33–8; Road: 29–12)
October: 1–1 (home: 0–0; road: 1–1)

Game	Date	Team	Score	High points	High rebounds	High assists	Location Attendance	Record
1	October 28	@ Detroit	L 121–127	McHale (25)	McHale (15)	Henderson (6)	Pontiac Silverdome; 17,117	0–1
2	October 29	@ Cleveland	W 108–89	McHale (22)	Bird (13)	Bird (7)	Richfield Coliseum; 8,194	1–1

November: 11–4 (home: 7–1; road: 4–3)

Game	Date	Team	Score	High points	High rebounds	High assists	Location Attendance	Record
3	November 2	Milwaukee	W 119–105	Bird (27)	Parish (16)	Bird (6)	Boston Garden; 14,890	2–1
4	November 4	Indiana	W 121–105	Parish (34)	Bird, Maxwell (9)	Johnson (9)	Boston Garden; 14,890	3–1
5	November 5	@ Washington	W 120–117	Bird (28)	Bird (8)	Bird (9)	Capital Centre; 16,250	4–1
6	November 8	@ Indiana	W 99–97	Bird (26)	Parish (11)	Bird (7)	Market Square Arena; 14,935	5–1
7	November 9	San Diego	W 129–122	Bird (25)	Bird (11)	Bird (9)	Boston Garden; 14,890	6–1
8	November 11	Detroit	W 126–118	Bird (39)	McHale, Parish (12)	Maxwell (8)	Boston Garden; 14,890	7–1
9	November 12	@ Chicago	W 116–101	Johnson (23)	Parish (13)	Maxwell (5)	Chicago Stadium; 11,942	8–1
10	November 15	@ Denver	W 140–124	Bird (28)	Parish (13)	Bird (10)	McNichols Sports Arena; 13,908	9–1
11	November 16	@ Utah	L 109–122	Parish (25)	Parish (17)	Bird (8)	Salt Palace Acord Arena; 12,743	9–2
12	November 18	New York	L 103–110	Johnson (18)	McHale (13)	Bird (8)	Boston Garden; 14,890	9–3
13	November 19	@ Philadelphia	L 91–92	Bird (18)	Parish (11)	Bird, Johnson (5)	The Spectrum; 17,921	9–4
14	November 22	@ New York	L 113–117 (2OT)	McHale (25)	Parish (13)	Bird (11)	Madison Square Garden; 16,921	9–5
15	November 25	Atlanta	W 109–102	Johnson (25)	Parish (11)	Bird (8)	Boston Garden; 14,890	10–5
16	November 27	Detroit	W 114–99	McHale (29)	Parish (13)	Bird (8)	Boston Garden; 14,890	11–5
17	November 30	San Antonio	W 130–106	Bird (23)	Bird (14)	Bird (13)	Boston Garden; 14,890	12–5

December: 12–3 (home: 5–2; road: 7–1)

Game	Date	Team	Score	High points	High rebounds	High assists	Location Attendance	Record
18	December 2	Portland	W 115–106	Bird (41)	Bird (14)	Johnson (11)	Boston Garden; 14,890	12–6
19	December 4	Philadelphia	L 114–121 (OT)	Bird (22)	Parish (13)	Bird (13)	Boston Garden; 14,890	13–6
20	December 6	@ Chicago	W 118–105	Bird (24)	McHale (14)	Johnson (8)	Chicago Stadium; 7,627	14–6
21	December 7	@ Indiana	W 100–95	Parish (21)	Parish (17)	Bird (5)	Market Square Arena; 13,725	15–6
22	December 9	Denver (at Hartford, Connecticut)	W 119–90	McHale (21)	Parish (7)	Johnson (8)	Hartford Civic Center; 13,374	16–6
23	December 10	@ Atlanta	W 104–87	Parish (24)	Parish (15)	Maxwell (6)	The Omni; 9,917	17–6
24	December 13	@ New York	W 102–100	Johnson (26)	Parish (11)	Henderson (5)	Madison Square Garden; 14,839	18–6
25	December 14	Cleveland	W 110–108	Parish (30)	Parish (16)	Henderson (6)	Boston Garden; 14,890	19–6
26	December 16	Washington	L 93–100	Bird (30)	Bird (10)	Ainge (6)	Boston Garden; 14,890	19–7
27	December 17	@ Detroit	W 129–115	McHale (30)	McHale (16)	Bird (9)	Pontiac Silverdome; 24,318	20–7
28	December 21	Atlanta	W 107–96	Bird, Maxwell, Parish (18)	Parish (9)	Bird (8)	Boston Garden; 14,890	21–7
29	December 23	New Jersey	W 125–113	Bird (26)	Parish (9)	Bird (8)	Boston Garden; 14,890	22–7
30	December 27	@ San Antonio	W 115–100	Bird (38)	Parish (12)	Bird (8)	HemisFair Arena; 13,112	23–7
31	December 29	@ Houston	L 94–107	Parish (28)	Parish (19)	Bird (4)	The Summit; 16,016	23–8
32	December 30; 8:35 p.m. EST	@ Dallas	W 114–109 (OT)	Bird (36)	Parish (14)	Johnson (6)	Reunion Arena; 17,007	24–8

January: 11–1 (home: 6–0; road: 5–1)

Game	Date	Team	Score	High points	High rebounds	High assists	Location Attendance	Record
33	January 3	@ New Jersey	W 105–103	Parish (27)	Parish (19)	Bird (5)	Brendan Byrne Arena; 13,478	25–8
34	January 4	Washington	W 113–104	Bird (23)	Bird (9)	Johnson (5)	Boston Garden; 14,890	26–8
35	January 6	Cleveland	W 115–97	Bird (19)	Bird (7)	Henderson (8)	Boston Garden; 14,890	27–8
36	January 11	Golden State	W 135–112	Parish (33)	Parish (14)	Henderson (8)	Boston Garden; 14,890	28–8
37	January 13	@ Philadelphia	W 105–104	Bird (29)	Bird (19)	Bird (8)	The Spectrum; 17,921	29–8
38	January 15	@ Milwaukee	L 87–106	Ainge (18)	Parish (9)	Parish (4)	MECCA Arena; 11,052	29–9
39	January 17	@ Kansas City	W 122–113	Bird (38)	Parish (14)	Bird (13)	Kemper Arena; 11,478	30–9
40	January 20	Indiana (at Hartford, Connecticut)	W 132–125	Bird (27)	Parish (13)	Maxwell (9)	Hartford Civic Center; 13,134	31–9
41	January 22	Milwaukee	W 109–98	Parish (22)	Parish (15)	Maxwell, Johnson (5)	Boston Garden; 14,890	32–9
42	January 24	@ Cleveland	W 118–97	Bird (24)	Parish (9)	Ainge (5)	Richfield Coliseum; 5,830	33–9
43	January 25	Philadelphia	W 102–98	Parish (24)	Parish (13)	Bird (7)	Boston Garden; 14,890	34–9
All-Star Break
44	January 31	@ Chicago	W 106–83	Bird (28)	Bird, Parish (12)	Henderson, Buckner (5)	Chicago Stadium; 9,430	35–9

February: 8–6 (home: 4–3; road: 4–3)

Game	Date	Team	Score	High points	High rebounds	High assists	Location Attendance	Record
45	February 1	Kansas City	W 119–110	Bird (32)	Parish (10)	Bird (7)	Boston Garden; 14,890	36–9
46	February 3	Indiana	W 125–106	Bird (27)	Bird (12)	Bird (9)	Boston Garden; 14,890	37–9
47	February 5	Detroit	W 137–134 (OT)	Parish (36)	Bird (19)	Ainge (7)	Boston Garden; 14,890	38–9
48	February 6	@ New Jersey	L 112–115	Bird (23)	Bird (12)	Henderson (7)	Brendan Byrne Arena; 14,808	38–10
49	February 8; 8:00 p.m. EST	Los Angeles	L 109–111	Bird (29)	Bird, Parish (11)	Bird (7)	Boston Garden; 14,890	38–11
50	February 10	Houston	W 114–101	McHale (30)	Bird (14)	Bird (12)	Boston Garden; 14,890	39–11
51	February 12	Philadelphia	L 91–109	Bird (25)	Parish (13)	Ainge (5)	Boston Garden; 14,890	39–12
52	February 16	@ Golden State	W 125–115	Parish (28)	Parish (14)	Bird (17)	Oakland–Alameda County Coliseum Arena; 13,335	40–12
53	February 17	@ Seattle	W 111–100	Bird (30)	Bird (13)	Bird (13)	Kingdome; 19,468	41–12
54	February 19	@ Portland	W 107–101	Bird (34)	Bird (18)	Bird (9)	Memorial Coliseum; 12,666	42–12
55	February 22	@ San Diego	L 107–114	Bird (24)	Maxwell (8)	Henderson (8)	San Diego Sports Arena; 11,718	42–13
56	February 24; 10:30 p.m. EST	@ Los Angeles	L 108–116	McHale (26)	Parish (12)	Bird (5)	The Forum; 17,505	42–14
57	February 26	@ Phoenix	W 116–109	Bird (23)	Bird (13)	Buckner (5)	Arizona Veterans Memorial Coliseum; 14,660	43–14
58	February 29	New York	L 98–102	Bird (30)	Parish (16)	Bird (6)	Boston Garden; 14,890	43–15

March: 13–4 (home: 7–2; road: 6–2)

Game	Date	Team	Score	High points	High rebounds	High assists	Location Attendance	Record
59	March 2	Chicago (at Hartford, Connecticut)	W 104–100	Bird (28)	Bird (12)	Johnson (7)	Hartford Civic Center; 14,529	44–15
60	March 4	Seattle	W 117–93	McHale (21)	McHale (12)	Bird (6)	Boston Garden; 14,890	45–15
61	March 6	@ Washington	W 108–85	Parish (26)	McHale (12)	Buckner (6)	Capital Centre; 11,216	46–15
62	March 7	Utah	W 117–106	Bird (26)	Bird (14)	Bird (9)	Boston Garden; 14,890	47–15
63	March 9	@ Milwaukee	W 129–128 (2OT)	Bird (30)	McHale (10)	Bird (12)	MECCA Arena; 11,052	48–15
64	March 11	Phoenix	W 117–109	Parish (33)	Parish (12)	Bird (10)	Boston Garden; 14,890	49–15
65	March 14	Washington	L 99–103	Bird (27)	Parish (9)	Bird, Henderson (6)	Boston Garden; 14,890	49–16
66	March 16	Milwaukee	W 109–99	Bird (28)	Bird (12)	Bird, Johnson (5)	Boston Garden; 14,890	50–16
67	March 17	@ Atlanta	W 103–88	Parish (22)	Parish (13)	Parish (6)	The Omni; 12,172	51–16
68	March 20	@ Indiana	L 121–123 (OT)	Bird (25)	McHale (14)	Bird (8)	Market Square Arena; 16,969	51–17
69	March 22	@ New York	W 108–100	Johnson, Bird, McHale (23)	Bird (9)	Bird (11)	Madison Square Garden; 19,591	52–17
70	March 23	New Jersey	L 97–101	Bird (33)	Bird (13)	Bird (4)	Boston Garden; 14,890	52–18
71	March 25	@ Philadelphia	L 114–119 (2OT)	Bird (33)	Bird (17)	Bird, Johnson, Henderson (6)	The Spectrum; 17,921	52–19
72	March 27	@ Washington	W 106–93	Johnson (24)	Parish (13)	Bird (13)	Capital Centre; 11,355	53–19
73	March 28; 7:30 p.m. EST	Dallas	W 114–107	Bird (23)	Bird, McHale (9)	Henderson (10)	Boston Garden; 14,890	54–19
74	March 30	Atlanta	W 105–96	Bird (19)	Bird (11)	Bird (7)	Boston Garden; 14,890	55–19
75	March 31	@ New Jersey	W 107–98	Parish (30)	Parish (13)	Buckner (6)	Brendan Byrne Arena; 17,034	56–19

April: 6–1 (home: 4–0; road: 2–1)

Game	Date	Team	Score	High points	High rebounds	High assists	Location Attendance	Record
76	April 3	@ Cleveland	W 98–86	Bird (29)	Parish (15)	Bird (6)	Richfield Coliseum; 7,094	57–19
77	April 6	Cleveland	W 113–94	Bird (33)	Parish (14)	Buckner (11)	Boston Garden; 14,890	58–19
78	April 8	Chicago	W 117–110	Bird (30)	Bird, Parish (10)	Bird (10)	Boston Garden; 14,890	59–19
79	April 10	@ Milwaukee	W 96–95	Parish (22)	Parish (9)	Johnson (8)	MECCA Arena; 10,795	60–19
80	April 11	New York	W 102–96	Bird (23)	Bird (11)	Bird, Johnson (6)	Boston Garden; 14,890	61–19
81	April 13	@ Detroit	L 120–128 (OT)	McHale (32)	Bird (20)	Johnson (8)	Pontiac Silverdome; 30,091	61–20
82	April 15	New Jersey	W 118–111	Henderson, Johnson (18)	Kite (10)	Bird (7)	Boston Garden; 14,890	62–20

1983–84 schedule

== Playoffs ==
1984 playoff game log
Total: 15–8 (home: 12–1; road: 3–7)
Eastern Conference First Round: 3–1 (home: 2–0; road: 1–1)

Game	Date	Team	Score	High points	High rebounds	High assists	Location Attendance	Series
1	April 17	Washington	W 91–83	Larry Bird (23)	Robert Parish (14)	Larry Bird (12)	Boston Garden; 14,890	1–0
2	April 19	Washington	W 88–85	Larry Bird (23)	Larry Bird (12)	Larry Bird (6)	Boston Garden; 14,890	2–0
3	April 21	@ Washington	L 108–111 (OT)	Larry Bird (27)	Robert Parish (16)	Bird, Johnson (6)	Capital Centre; 8,359	2–1
4	April 24	@ Washington	W 99–96	Robert Parish (20)	Robert Parish (12)	Larry Bird (7)	Capital Centre; 13,853	3–1

Eastern Conference Semifinals: 4–3 (home: 4–0; road: 0–3)

Game	Date	Team	Score	High points	High rebounds	High assists	Location Attendance	Series
1	April 29	New York	W 110–92	Kevin McHale (25)	Robert Parish (12)	Larry Bird (12)	Boston Garden; 14,890	1–0
2	May 2	New York	W 116–102	Larry Bird (37)	Bird, Parish (11)	Dennis Johnson (7)	Boston Garden; 14,890	2–0
3	May 4	@ New York	L 92–100	Larry Bird (24)	Larry Bird (11)	Dennis Johnson (4)	Madison Square Garden; 19,591	2–1
4	May 6	@ New York	L 113–118	Larry Bird (29)	Larry Bird (11)	Dennis Johnson (7)	Madison Square Garden; 15,840	2–2
5	May 9	New York	W 121–99	Larry Bird (26)	Robert Parish (10)	Larry Bird (10)	Boston Garden; 14,890	3–2
6	May 11	@ New York	L 104–106	Larry Bird (35)	Larry Bird (11)	Gerald Henderson (8)	Madison Square Garden; 19,591	3–3
7	May 13	New York	W 121–104	Larry Bird (39)	Larry Bird (12)	Larry Bird (10)	Boston Garden; 14,890	4–3

Eastern Conference Finals: 4–1 (home: 3–0; road: 1–1)

Game	Date	Team	Score	High points	High rebounds	High assists	Location Attendance	Series
1	May 15	Milwaukee	W 119–96	Larry Bird (24)	Kevin McHale (7)	Gerald Henderson (7)	Boston Garden; 14,890	1–0
2	May 17	Milwaukee	W 125–110	Larry Bird (32)	Larry Bird (13)	Larry Bird (7)	Boston Garden; 14,890	2–0
3	May 19	@ Milwaukee	W 109–100	Larry Bird (28)	Robert Parish (16)	Larry Bird (6)	MECCA Arena; 11,052	3–0
4	May 21	@ Milwaukee	L 113–122	Larry Bird (32)	Larry Bird (10)	Larry Bird (8)	MECCA Arena; 11,052	3–1
5	May 23	Milwaukee	W 115–108	Larry Bird (21)	Larry Bird (13)	Bird, Maxwell (4)	Boston Garden; 14,890	4–1

NBA Finals: 4–3 (home: 3–1; road: 1–2)

Game	Date	Team	Score	High points	High rebounds	High assists	Location Attendance	Series
1	May 27; 1:00 p.m. EDT	Los Angeles	L 109–115	McHale (25)	Bird (14)	Bird (5)	Boston Garden; 14,890	0–1
2	May 31; 9:00 p.m. EDT	Los Angeles	W 124–121 (OT)	Bird (27)	Bird (13)	Ainge, Henderson (5)	Boston Garden; 14,890	1–1
3	June 3; 3:30 p.m. EDT	@ Los Angeles	L 104–137	Bird (30)	Parish (12)	Maxwell (5)	The Forum; 17,505	1–2
4	June 6; 9:00 p.m. EDT	@ Los Angeles	W 129–125 (OT)	Bird (29)	Bird (21)	Johnson (14)	The Forum; 17,505	2–2
5	June 8; 9:00 p.m. EDT	Los Angeles	W 121–103	Bird (34)	Bird (17)	Henderson (9)	Boston Garden; 14,890	3–2
6	June 10; 3:30 p.m. EDT	@ Los Angeles	L 108–119	Bird (28)	Bird (14)	Bird (8)	The Forum; 17,505	3–3
7	June 12; 9:00 p.m. EDT	Los Angeles	W 111–102	Maxwell (24)	Parish (16)	Maxwell (8)	Boston Garden; 14,890	4–3

1984 schedule

== Player stats ==
Note: GP= Games played; REB= Rebounds; AST= Assists; STL = Steals; BLK = Blocks; PTS = Points; AVG = Scoring Average

Player	GP	REB	AST	STL	BLK	PTS	AVG
Larry Bird	79	796	520	144	69	1908	24.2
Robert Parish	80	857	139	55	116	1520	19.0
Kevin McHale	82	610	104	23	126	1511	18.4
Dennis Johnson	80	280	338	93	57	1053	13.2
Cedric Maxwell	80	461	205	63	24	955	11.9
Gerald Henderson	78	147	300	117	14	908	11.6
Danny Ainge	71	116	162	41	4	384	5.4
Scott Wedman	68	139	67	27	7	327	4.8
Quinn Buckner	79	137	214	84	3	324	4.1
M.L. Carr	60	75	49	17	4	185	3.1
Greg Kite	35	62	7	1	5	65	1.9
Carlos Clark	31	17	17	8	1	54	1.7

== NBA Finals ==
=== Game One ===
The Lakers opened the series with a 115–109 victory at Boston Garden.

=== Game Two ===
In Game 2, the Lakers led 113–111 with 18 seconds left when Gerald Henderson stole a James Worthy pass to score a game tying layup and the Celtics eventually prevailed in overtime 124–121.

=== Game Three ===
In Game 3, the Lakers raced to an easy 137–104 victory as Magic Johnson dished out 21 assists. After the game, Larry Bird said his team played like "sissies" in an attempt to light a fire under his teammates.

=== Game Four ===
In Game 4, the Lakers had a five-point lead with less than a minute to play, but made several execution errors as the Celtics tied the game and then came away with a 129–125 victory in overtime. The game was also marked by Celtic forward Kevin McHale's takedown of Laker forward Kurt Rambis on a breakaway layup which triggered the physical aspect of the rivalry. Kareem Abdul-Jabbar would go after Larry Bird later on in the third quarter, and 1981 Finals MVP Cedric Maxwell further antagonized the Lakers by following a missed James Worthy free throw by crossing the lane with his hands around his own neck, symbolizing that Worthy was "choking" under pressure. Also, Bird pushed Michael Cooper to the baseline following the inbound play during the second quarter.

=== Game Five ===
In Game 5, the Celtics took a 3–2 series lead as Larry Bird scored 34 points. The game was known as the "Heat Game", as it was played under 97-degree heat, and without any air conditioning, at Boston Garden. The Celtics did not warm up with their sweat pants on because of extreme heat, and oxygen tanks were provided to give air to exhausted players.

=== Game Six ===
In Game 6, the Lakers evened the series with a 119–108 victory. In the game the Lakers answered the Celtics' rough tactics when Laker forward James Worthy shoved Cedric Maxwell into a basket support. After the game a Laker fan threw a beer at Celtics guard M.L. Carr as he left the floor, causing him to label the series "all-out-war."

=== Game Seven ===
In Game 7, the heat that was an issue in Game 5 was not so bad (indoor temperatures hovered around 91 degrees during the game, due to additional fans being brought in to try to cool the air). The Celtics were led by Cedric Maxwell who had 24 points, eight rebounds and eight assists as they came away with a 111–102 victory. In the game the Lakers rallied from a 14-point-deficit to three with one minute remaining when Cedric Maxwell knocked the ball away from Magic Johnson. Dennis Johnson responded by sinking two free throws to seal the victory. Larry Bird was named MVP of the series.

The series was the eighth time in NBA history that the Celtics and Lakers met in the NBA finals, with Boston winning each time.

== Award winners ==
- Larry Bird, NBA Free Throw Percentage Leader (88.8%)
- Larry Bird, NBA Most Valuable Player
- Larry Bird, NBA Finals Most Valuable Player
- Larry Bird, All-NBA First Team
- Kevin McHale, Sixth Man of the Year Award
