= Quinn Buckner =

American basketball player and coach (born 1954)

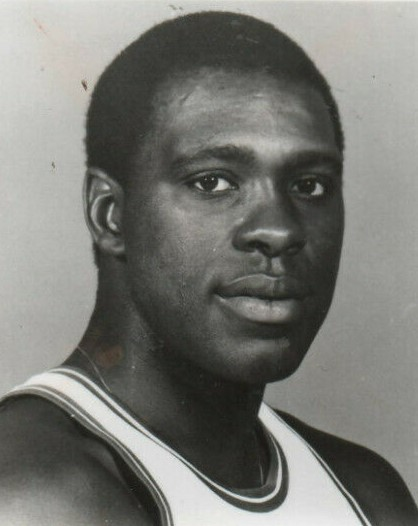
- Buckner as a member of the Boston Celtics in 1985

Personal information
- Born: August 20, 1954 (age 72) Phoenix, Illinois, U.S.
- Listed height: 6 ft 3 in (1.91 m)
- Listed weight: 190 lb (86 kg)

Career information
- High school: Thornridge (Dolton, Illinois)
- College: Indiana (1972–1976)
- NBA draft: 1976: 1st round, 7th overall pick
- Drafted by: Milwaukee Bucks
- Playing career: 1976–1986
- Position: Point guard
- Number: 21, 28, 25

Career history

Playing
- 1976–1982: Milwaukee Bucks
- 1982–1985: Boston Celtics
- 1985–1986: Indiana Pacers

Coaching
- 1993–1994: Dallas Mavericks

Career highlights
- NBA champion (1984); 4× NBA All-Defensive Second Team (1978, 1980–1982); NCAA champion (1976); CCAT (1974); Third-team All-American – NABC (1975); 2× First-team All-Big Ten (1974, 1975); Mr. Basketball USA (1972); First-team Parade All-American (1972)

Career statistics
- Points: 5,929 (8.2 ppg)
- Assists: 3,114 (4.3 apg)
- Steals: 1,337 (1.9 spg)
- Stats at NBA.com
- Stats at Basketball Reference
- Collegiate Basketball Hall of Fame
Medals
Men's basketball
Representing United States
Olympic Games
Gold medal – first place	1976 Montreal	Team competition
FIBA World Championship
Bronze medal – third place	1974 Puerto Rico	Team competition

William Quinn Buckner (born August 20, 1954) is an American former professional basketball player and coach. He played collegiate basketball for the Indiana University Hoosiers, and won a national championship in 1976. He was a captain of the last undefeated NCAA Division I basketball champion and of the 1976 Olympics gold medal team. Buckner was selected by the Milwaukee Bucks with the 7th pick of the 1976 NBA draft. He had a ten-year NBA career for three teams: the Bucks, the Boston Celtics, and the Indiana Pacers. In 1984, he won an NBA title with the Celtics.

Buckner is one of only eight players to achieve a basketball Triple Crown: winning an NCAA championship, an NBA championship, and an Olympic gold medal. He is one of only three players to win a high school state championship (in Illinois), NCAA championship, an NBA championship, and an Olympic gold medal.

After his playing career, Buckner was the head coach of the Dallas Mavericks for one year, from 1993 to 1994. He spent several years as the play-by-play announcer on 989 Sports for college basketball games. Currently, he is a color analyst for the Pacers television broadcast team on FanDuel Sports Network Indiana.

== Early life ==
Born in 1954 in Phoenix, Illinois, Buckner played basketball at Thornridge High School in Dolton, Illinois. His Falcons lost only one game during his junior and senior seasons and won back-to-back state titles. The 1972 team was undefeated, with no team coming within 14 points of it, and is often called the greatest team in the history of Illinois high school basketball. Buckner was also an excellent football player, making all-state in high school. He is the only person ever named Chicago-area Player of the Year for both football and basketball.

In 2006, Buckner was voted as one of the 100 Legends of the IHSA Boys Basketball Tournament, a group of former players and coaches named during the 100th anniversary of the IHSA boys basketball tournament.

== College career ==
Buckner earned an undergraduate degree in business from Kelley School of Business at Indiana University Bloomington in 1976. He was elected to play college basketball for the Indiana University Hoosiers under Coach Bob Knight. He ended his college career as a four-year starter and three-year captain at Indiana, and also played football for one year.

In Buckner's freshman season, 1972–73, Indiana reached the Final Four, losing to UCLA. He played for the United States men's national basketball team in the 1974 FIBA World Championship, winning the bronze medal. The following season, 1975–76, Buckner served as a co-captain and the Hoosiers went the entire season and 1976 NCAA tournament without a single loss, beating Michigan 86–68 in the title game. Indiana remains the last school to accomplish this feat.

== NBA career ==
Over his 10-year NBA career, Buckner was recognized for his defensive tenacity, playmaking ability, and role as a stabilizing presence in lineups. He served variously as a team leader and reliable reserve.

Although he scored only 10.0 points per game during his college career, Buckner was selected by the Milwaukee Bucks in the first round of the 1976 NBA draft, the seventh pick overall. He was also selected by the Washington Redskins in the 1976 NFL draft. (Buckner had played free safety on the Hoosiers’ football team for two years.)

Before he joined the Bucks, Buckner played on the gold medal-winning 1976 U.S. Olympic basketball team alongside Adrian Dantley, Mitch Kupchak, and Scott May. But nothing could have prepared him for the NBA experience. Buckner's teams had suffered only 25 defeats in his eight years of high school and college basketball, and he had never been on a team that lost more than seven games in a season. But Milwaukee lost 52 times in 1976–77, finishing last in the Midwest Division.

Individually, Buckner proved to be a competent NBA player. He was unspectacular offensively, averaging 8.6 points while shooting .434 from the field, but he excelled on defense, ranking fourth in the league with 2.43 steals per game.

The next year Buckner raised his scoring slightly, to 9.3 points per game, and was named to the NBA All-Defensive Second Team. That postseason, Buckner set a playoffs career-high with 19 points alongside recording 10 assists in a Game 7 loss against the Denver Nuggets in the conference semifinals (the Bucks were in the Western Conference at the time). After a similar season in 1978–79, Buckner had his three best years. In 1979–80 he averaged 10.7 points and 5.7 assists, made the NBA All-Defensive Second Team for the second time, and helped the Bucks to the Midwest Division title. Under Coach Don Nelson, Milwaukee had assembled a solid lineup that included forward Marques Johnson, center Bob Lanier, and guards Brian Winters, Sidney Moncrief, and Junior Bridgeman.

The 1980–81 campaign saw Buckner play in all 82 games and notch career highs in scoring (13.3 ppg), field-goal percentage (.493), free-throw percentage (.734), and steals (197, third in the league). He repeated on the NBA All-Defensive Second Team. The Bucks were outstanding, finishing 60–22 with a balanced offense that saw seven players average in double figures. Milwaukee had high hopes for the postseason, but Julius Erving's Philadelphia 76ers derailed the Bucks in the Eastern Conference Semifinals.

Milwaukee was trying to add a few essential parts that would turn the team into a championship contender, and the bottleneck at guard made Buckner expendable.

Milwaukee never did win the title. Boston, however, won a championship in 1984, with Buckner coming off the bench to spell Dennis Johnson and Gerald Henderson. The Celtics went 62–20 during the regular season and then nudged the Los Angeles Lakers in a seven-game NBA Finals. With the NBA championship ring, Buckner completed a Triple Crown résumé, one of only eight players in basketball history to do so.

In three seasons with Boston, Buckner made small but regular contributions for a powerful Celtics team. The club returned to the Finals in 1985, but the Lakers exacted their revenge, winning in six games.

Following the season, Boston traded Buckner to the Indiana Pacers for guard Jerry Sichting. He opened the 1985–86 season with the Pacers but was waived after 32 games, and subsequently retired, ending his 10-year career.

== NBA career statistics ==
Legend
GP	Games played	GS	Games started	MPG	Minutes per game
FG%	Field goal percentage	3P%	3-point field goal percentage	FT%	Free throw percentage
RPG	Rebounds per game	APG	Assists per game	SPG	Steals per game
BPG	Blocks per game	PPG	Points per game	**Bold**	Career high

=== Regular season ===
Year	Team	GP	GS	MPG	FG%	3P%	FT%	RPG	APG	SPG	BPG	PPG
1976–77	Milwaukee	79	–	26.5	.434	–	.539	3.3	4.7	2.4	**0.3**	8.6
1977–78	Milwaukee	**82**	–	25.3	.468	–	.645	3.0	5.6	2.3	0.2	9.3
1978–79	Milwaukee	81	–	21.7	.454	–	.632	2.6	**5.8**	1.9	0.2	7.2
1979–80	Milwaukee	67	–	25.2	.467	**.400**	**.734**	**3.6**	5.7	2.0	0.1	10.7
1980–81	Milwaukee	**82**	–	29.1	**.493**	.167	**.734**	**3.6**	4.7	2.4	0.0	**13.3**
1981–82	Milwaukee	70	**70**	**30.8**	.482	.267	.655	**3.6**	4.7	**2.5**	0.0	12.9
1982–83	Boston	72	56	21.7	.442	.000	.632	2.6	3.8	1.5	0.1	7.9
1983–84	Boston	79	0	15.8	.427	.000	.649	1.7	2.7	1.1	0.0	4.1
1984–85	Boston	75	6	11.4	.383	.000	.640	1.2	2.0	0.8	0.0	2.4
1985–86	Indiana	32	3	13.1	.471	.000	.704	1.6	2.7	1.3	0.1	3.7
Career		719	135	22.6	.461	.184	.657	2.7	4.3	1.9	0.1	8.2

=== Playoffs ===
Year	Team	GP	GS	MPG	FG%	3P%	FT%	RPG	APG	SPG	BPG	PPG
1977–78	Milwaukee	9	–	**28.6**	.500	–	.652	**3.0**	**6.9**	2.0	**0.1**	**11.2**
1979–80	Milwaukee	7	–	23.6	.340	.000	.636	2.3	4.4	**2.1**	0.0	6.1
1980–81	Milwaukee	7	–	26.1	.433	.000	**.688**	2.9	5.0	1.6	0.0	9.0
1982–83	Boston	7	–	14.0	.432	.000	.000	1.4	0.3	0.1	0.0	4.6
1983–84	Boston	**23**	–	11.7	.405	.000	.545	1.5	1.2	0.6	0.0	3.3
1984–85	Boston	15	0	5.7	**.591**	.000	.625	0.5	0.8	0.4	0.0	2.1
Career		68	0	15.5	.439	.000	.610	1.7	2.5	0.9	0.0	5.1

== Broadcasting career ==
He later on became a broadcaster for ESPN and NBC. He also called college and NBA basketball for CBS Sports and called games for the Minnesota Timberwolves in the early 1990s with Kevin Harlan, as well as games for the Cleveland Cavaliers.

Buckner now calls Indianapolis his home and is the color commentator for Indiana Pacers television broadcasts currently on DAZN streaming platform (previously Fox Sports Indiana from 1999 to 2021 and Bally Sports Indiana since 2021). Buckner participates in community relations efforts and contributes to Pacers TipOff, a game preview newsletter distributed via e-mail for every home Pacers game.

== Coaching career ==
He was named head coach of the Dallas Mavericks for 1993–94. The club had gone 11–71 the previous season, and the franchise was in disarray. Although Buckner had no NBA coaching experience, Mavericks owner Don Carter hoped Buckner's charismatic personality and lifelong knack for winning would rub off on the young team. In an interview with the Arizona Republic, Buckner repeated his success formula: "Dedication, commitment, extreme concentration, discipline, realizing it can’t be done alone, it has to be done through the team."

Believing that his young charges needed more discipline, Buckner determined from the start to be a stern taskmaster in Knight's mold. Knight had advised Buckner that he would only be able to win in the NBA if he ran his team with an iron hand. The plan backfired, with many of the players (including Jamal Mashburn) complaining publicly about Buckner's heavy-handed coaching style. NBA historian Peter Bjarkman even suggested that Buckner frequently consulted with Knight during the season. They started 1–23, and for a while it looked like they would break the 1972–73 Philadelphia 76ers' record for the most losses in a season. Buckner loosened the reins a little bit as the season wore on, but it was not enough to keep the team from finishing 13–69—by far the worst record in the league, and at the time the worst record ever for a rookie coach who managed to survive for a full season (surpassed by Bill Hanzlik with the 1997–98 Denver Nuggets).

Buckner also angered Carter and other executives by not consulting them on hiring assistant coaches; they only learned about those hires when they called and asked how much they would get for moving expenses. Although Buckner had a five-year contract, Carter decided that "too many bridges had been burned" and fired him after the season.

=== Head coaching record ===
Legend
Regular season	G	Games coached	W	Games won	L	Games lost	W–L %	Win–loss %
Playoffs	PG	Playoff games	PW	Playoff wins	PL	Playoff losses	PW–L %	Playoff win–loss %

Team	Year	G	W	L	W–L%	Finish	PG	PW	PL	PW–L%	Result
Dallas	1993–94	82	13	69	.159	6th in Midwest	–	–	–	–	Missed Playoffs
Career		82	13	69	.159		–	–	–	–	

== Personal life ==
In July 2004, Buckner was named the Vice President of Communications for Pacers Sports & Entertainment (PS&E), which owns and operates the Indiana Pacers, the WNBA's Indiana Fever and the Pacers Foundation, Inc.

In 2016, Buckner was appointed to the Indiana University Board of Trustees by Governor Mike Pence and is the current chair of the board. He is a member of Alpha Phi Alpha fraternity.

== See also ==
- List of National Basketball Association single-game steals leaders
