= Cedric Maxwell =

American basketball player (born 1955)

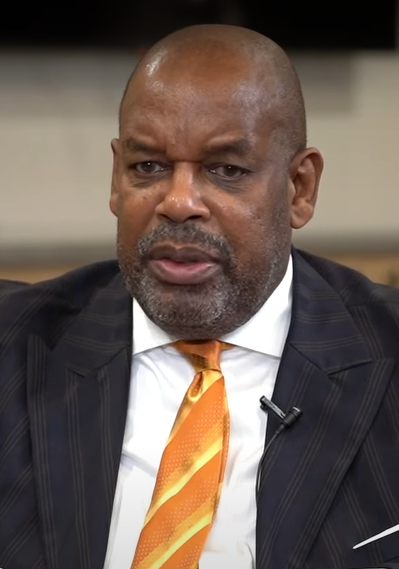
- Maxwell in 2022

Personal information
- Born: November 21, 1955 (age 70) Kinston, North Carolina, U.S.
- Listed height: 6 ft 8 in (2.03 m)
- Listed weight: 205 lb (93 kg)

Career information
- High school: Kinston (Kinston, North Carolina)
- College: Charlotte (1973–1977)
- NBA draft: 1977: 1st round, 12th overall pick
- Drafted by: Boston Celtics
- Playing career: 1977–1988
- Position: Small forward
- Number: 30, 31, 19, 18

Career history

Playing
- 1977–1985: Boston Celtics
- 1985–1987: Los Angeles Clippers
- 1987–1988: Houston Rockets

Career highlights
- 2× NBA champion (1981, 1984); NBA Finals MVP (1981); No. 31 retired by Boston Celtics; Third-team All-American – UPI (1977); Sun Belt Player of the Year (1977); First-team All-Sun Belt (1977); No. 33 retired by Charlotte 49ers

Career statistics
- Points: 10,465 (12.5 ppg)
- Rebounds: 5,261 (6.3 rpg)
- Assists: 1,862 (2.2 apg)
- Stats at NBA.com
- Stats at Basketball Reference

Cedric Bryan Maxwell (born November 21, 1955) is an American former professional basketball player now in radio broadcasting. Nicknamed "Cornbread", he played 11 seasons in the National Basketball Association (NBA), and played a key role in two championships with the Boston Celtics.

After a college career in which he led the UNC Charlotte 49ers to an NCAA Final Four appearance in 1977, he was drafted by the Boston Celtics. After coming off the bench his rookie year, he was elevated to a starting small forward position for the 1978–1979 season, a disappointing 29–53 team on which Maxwell was the lone bright spot. The following year, Larry Bird joined the Celtics, and the team started a resurgence that saw them become one of the dominant teams of the 1980s. Maxwell and Bird were joined in the 1980–1981 season by veteran starting center Robert Parish and rookie forward Kevin McHale, a year in which the team won the NBA championship and Maxwell was named Finals MVP.

Maxwell and McHale would compete for the starting power forward position over the next several seasons, with McHale winning the starting job and Maxwell being traded to the Los Angeles Clippers just prior to the 1985–1986 season. Maxwell would play for a season and a half for the Clippers, before being traded midway through the 1986–1987 season to the Houston Rockets, where he would finish out his career before retiring after the 1987–1988 season with over 10,000 points scored over his career.

Since retiring as a player, he briefly coached the Long Island Surf of the United States Basketball League before starting his career as a radio broadcaster, serving as the color commentator for Celtics radio broadcasts since 2001. His jersey number 31 was retired by the Celtics in 2003.

== College career ==
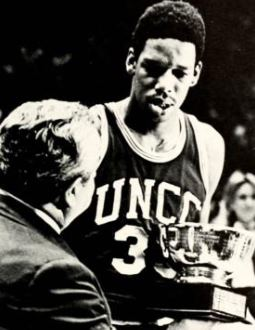
Maxwell as a junior at UNC Charlotte

Maxwell was a star forward/center for the UNC Charlotte 49ers. Among the 49ers, Maxwell ranks 6th all-time in points scored and his No. 33 jersey was retired in 1977, when he led UNC Charlotte to the NCAA Final Four. Upon completion of his career at Charlotte, Maxwell was the 12th overall pick in the 1977 NBA draft. He was drafted by the Boston Celtics, where he played for eight of his eleven seasons. During his time at UNC Charlotte, he was initiated in Omega Psi Phi fraternity via the Epsilon Zeta chapter.

== Professional career ==
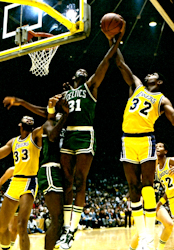
Maxwell (No. 31) in 1985 competing for a rebound with Magic Johnson

Maxwell made an impact in his second season with the Celtics. While Boston was mired in an otherwise awful 1978–79 NBA season, as they awaited Larry Bird's decision to sign with the franchise, the second-year power forward averaged 19.0 points and 9.9 rebounds per game. The Celtics would go just 29–53 on the year, but the young Maxwell's potential, along with the promising addition of Bird and others, set the stage for what would become an NBA dynasty.

Maxwell was best known for his moves near or beneath the basket. He was very effective in the low post, faking defenders into the air, drawing contact, then making high percentage shots, and sometimes drawing a foul, using either his jump-hook close to the basket or going up against the glass. It was rare that Maxwell took an outside jump shot, especially when Celtic teammates like Bird or Tiny Archibald were on the floor. This helped the Celtics run a balanced offense with a formidable inside game that was hard for most teams to defend.

Maxwell, in addition to being a dangerous scorer and a colorful character, was a clutch performer in the playoffs. Maxwell was named MVP of the 1981 NBA Finals; as of 2025, he is the only player eligible for the Naismith Memorial Basketball Hall of Fame to ever win Finals MVP and not be named a Hall of Famer.

Three years later, Maxwell scored 24 points against the Los Angeles Lakers in the decisive game-seven victory during the 1984 NBA Finals. Before the game, he told his teammates to "climb on my back, boys." Maxwell's colorful side was also on display in the series as he mocked second-year Laker forward James Worthy's inability to make free throws during overtime of game 4 by walking across the lane between free throws with his hands around his own neck, suggesting Worthy's choking under pressure. Maxwell also made fun of Kurt Rambis prior to Game 4 of the 1984 Finals, wearing Rambis's trademark glasses and intentionally missing a long range shot in front of loyal Rambis fans known as the Rambis Youth. The following season, after an injury, Maxwell lost his starting role to Kevin McHale, who had spent two seasons coming off the bench and was in the process of winning his second consecutive Sixth Man of the Year.

Maxwell was traded, with a draft pick, on September 6, 1985, to the Los Angeles Clippers for center Bill Walton. Maxwell spent a season and a half with the Clippers before being dealt to the Houston Rockets in January, 1987, for two draft picks. He finally retired after the 1987–88 NBA season, having scored 10,465 points and pulled down 5,261 rebounds over the course of 11 seasons, which averages over the course of his career to 12.5 points and 6.3 rebounds a game.

== Career after the NBA ==
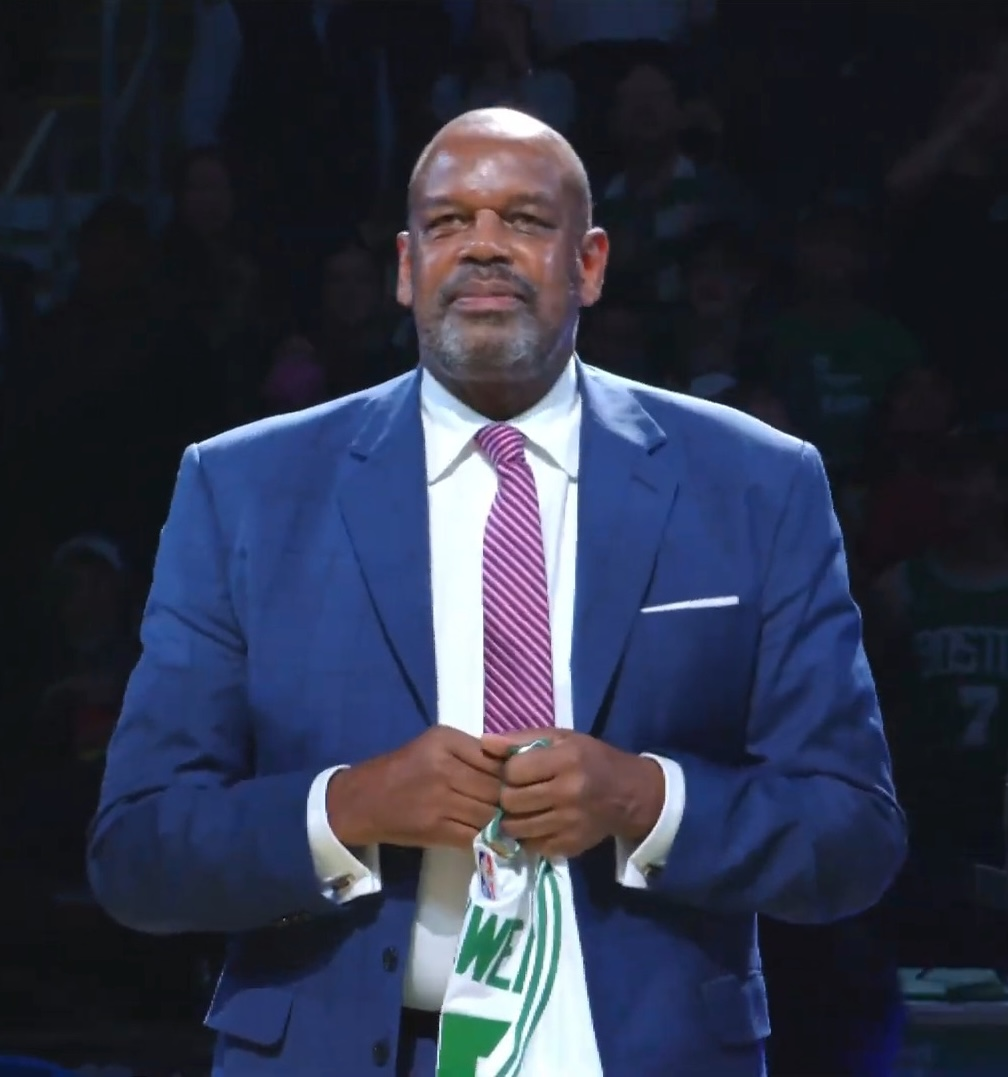
Maxwell in 2022

Maxwell was the 22nd former Celtic to have his jersey (number 31) retired by the Celtics on December 15, 2003. He is now a radio broadcaster for WBZ-FM in Boston, where he has announced Boston Celtics games with Sean Grande since 2001 and lives in Weston, Massachusetts. He was also a frequent co-host on WEEI's sports talk radio shows, such as The Big Show with former Celtics TV announcer Glenn Ordway, before Ordway parted with the station. He made guest appearances with the successor program Salk & Holley. In June 2013, Grande and Maxwell, better known in Boston as Grande and Max, began co-hosting a new show, Celtics Summer Cooler, a weekly offseason update on the Celtics. Maxwell came under fire for comments he made on the air during a game in 2007. Unhappy with the officiating of referee Violet Palmer, he told listeners that Palmer should "go back to the kitchen" and "make me some bacon and eggs." Maxwell apologized during a subsequent broadcast. Following the Celtics Eastern Conference Final victories in 2022, and 2024, Maxwell served as the presenter giving the Celtics both the Bob Cousy and Larry Bird Trophies. He also hosts basketball clinics in the Boston area.

On the March 16, 2010 Primetime with The Packman radio show (WFNZ-AM) originating out of Charlotte, Cedric Maxwell stated he was open to the coaching position at Charlotte. He went on to say he was hoping the school would at least offer him an interview.

Since 2019, Maxwell has hosted The Cedric Maxwell Podcast in collaboration with CLNS Media, which is Boston sports organization.

In 2022, Maxwell published his autobiography If These Walls Could Talk which recalls his early life along with his NBA and broadcast careers. It was co-authored by Mike Isenberg.

== Nickname ==
Maxwell received the nickname "Cornbread" from his college teammate Melvin Watkins after the pair went to see the movie Cornbread, Earl and Me, in which a 12-year-old boy is traumatized by the murder of his friend, a star basketball player. Watkins thought that Maxwell looked like the title character (played by Jamaal Wilkes) and so began calling him Cornbread. Since Maxwell did not like the nickname, it did not gain widespread use until Maxwell was named MVP of the 1976 National Invitation Tournament (NIT), when, according to Watkins, "The New York media picked up on [the nickname]." He has also been dubbed "the godfather of Kinston hoops" by local media.

== Career statistics ==
=== NBA ===
Legend
GP	Games played	GS	Games started	MPG	Minutes per game
FG%	Field goal percentage	3P%	3-point field goal percentage	FT%	Free throw percentage
RPG	Rebounds per game	APG	Assists per game	SPG	Steals per game
BPG	Blocks per game	PPG	Points per game	**Bold**	Career high
†	Won an NBA championship	*	Led the league

==== Regular season ====
Year	Team	GP	GS	MPG	FG%	3P%	FT%	RPG	APG	SPG	BPG	PPG
1977–78	Boston	72		16.8	.538		.752	5.3	0.9	0.7	0.7	7.3
1978–79	Boston	80		**37.1**	.584*		.802	**9.9**	**2.9**	**1.2**	**0.9**	**19.0**
1979–80	Boston	80	80	34.3	**.609***		.787	8.8	2.5	1.0	0.8	16.9
1980–81†	Boston	**81**	**81**	33.7	.588	.000	.782	6.5	2.7	1.0	0.8	15.2
1981–82	Boston	78	73	33.2	.548	.000	.747	6.4	2.3	1.0	0.6	14.8
1982–83	Boston	79	71	28.5	.499	.000	.812	5.3	2.4	0.8	0.5	11.9
1983–84†	Boston	80	78	31.3	.532	**.167**	.753	5.8	2.6	0.8	0.3	11.9
1984–85	Boston	57	51	26.2	.533	.000	**.831**	4.2	1.8	0.6	0.3	11.1
1985–86	L.A. Clippers	76	72	32.3	.475	.000	.795	8.2	2.8	0.8	0.4	14.1
1986–87	L.A. Clippers/Houston	**81**	31	24.3	.530	.000	.775	5.4	2.4	0.5	0.2	10.0
1987–88	Houston	71	0	11.9	.468	.000	.769	2.5	0.8	0.3	0.2	3.8
Career		835	537	28.5	.546	.053	.784	6.3	2.2	0.8	0.5	12.5

==== Playoffs ====
Year	Team	GP	GS	MPG	FG%	3P%	FT%	RPG	APG	SPG	BPG	PPG
1980	Boston	9		**35.6**	**.634**		.754	**10.0**	2.1	0.6	**1.1**	**18.2**
1981†	Boston	17		35.2	.580		.818	7.4	2.7	0.7	0.9	16.1
1982	Boston	12		32.1	.517		.714	7.3	2.2	**1.5**	0.9	14.5
1983	Boston	7		35.1	.527		**.842**	7.3	**3.3**	0.6	0.6	12.9
1984†	Boston	**23**		32.7	.503	.000	.779	5.2	2.4	1.0	0.3	11.9
1985	Boston	20	0	11.9	.488		.791	2.4	0.4	0.5	0.1	3.8
1987	Houston	10	0	17.7	.529	.000	.743	3.3	1.7	0.4	0.0	6.2
1988	Houston	4	0	3.8	.500			0.3	0.3	0.0	0.0	0.5
Career		102	0	26.8	.545	.000	.777	5.4	1.9	0.7	0.5	10.9

== See also ==
- List of NBA career field goal percentage leaders
