= 1981 NBA Finals =

1981 basketball championship series

Team	Coach	Wins
Boston Celtics	Bill Fitch	4
Houston Rockets	Del Harris	2
- Dates: May 5–14
- MVP: Cedric Maxwell (Boston Celtics)
- Hall of Famers: Celtics: Nate Archibald (1991); Larry Bird (1998); Kevin McHale (1999); Robert Parish (2003); Rockets: Moses Malone (2001); Calvin Murphy (1993); Rudy Tomjanovich (2020; coach); Coaches: Bill Fitch (2019); Del Harris (2022); Officials: Darell Garretson (2016); Earl Strom (1995)
- Eastern finals: Celtics defeated 76ers, 4–3
- Western finals: Rockets defeated Kings, 4–1

The 1981 NBA World Championship Series was the championship round of the National Basketball Association (NBA)'s 1980–81 season, and the culmination of the season's playoffs. It pitted the 62–20 Eastern Conference champion Boston Celtics against the 40–42 Western Conference champion Houston Rockets. The Celtics defeated the Rockets in six games for their fourteenth NBA championship.

This series has the distinction of featuring for the third time in NBA history, and last to date, a team with a losing record in the Finals. They were the first team since the Minneapolis Lakers in 1959 to reach the championship round despite having more regular season losses than wins. This, along with 1986 (which was also played by the Celtics and the Rockets), was one of the only two NBA Finals of the 1980s not to feature the Lakers.

As of 2026, this is the last time the Celtics won the NBA championship on the road.

== Background ==
=== Houston Rockets ===
Prior to the season, the NBA moved the Rockets and San Antonio Spurs from the Central Division of the Eastern Conference to the Midwest Division of the Western Conference. The Rockets and Spurs traded places with the Chicago Bulls and Milwaukee Bucks. The Midwest Division also took in the expansion Dallas Mavericks.

The Rockets that season were led by Moses Malone, who practically carried the Rockets to the NBA Finals. Meanwhile, Calvin Murphy, the shortest player in the league at the time, set two NBA records, sinking 78 consecutive free throws to break Rick Barry's mark of 60 set in 1976 and achieving a free-throw percentage of .958, breaking Rick Barry's record set with the Rockets in 1979. Other key contributors of the 1980–81 team were Rudy Tomjanovich, Robert Reid, Mike Dunleavy Sr., Allen Leavell, Billy Paultz, Bill Willoughby, Calvin Garrett, Tom Henderson, and Major Jones. The Rockets clinched the last spot in the playoffs on the final night of the regular season following a loss by the Golden State Warriors to Seattle, as Golden State had the tiebreaker over Houston. Houston tied with Kansas City for second place in the Midwest behind San Antonio with a regular season record of 40–42 (this would be only the second time that an NBA team with a losing record would make the Finals, after 1959).

Houston's playoff run began by drawing the defending NBA champion Los Angeles Lakers and Magic Johnson in the first round. The Rockets upset Los Angeles, two games to one, with the Rockets winning both games in Los Angeles. The Western Conference semifinals matchup featured the Rockets against the Spurs and multi-year scoring champion George Gervin in a Texas Shootout. The Rockets would win the series in seven games behind strong contributions from Murphy and Reid, including Murphy's career playoff high of 42 points in the climactic Game 7 at San Antonio. This set up an unlikely Conference finals matchup with Kansas City, being that both teams finished the regular season with identical losing records, together compiling just 80 total victories of 164 games played. The Kings, led by Otis Birdsong, Scott Wedman, and Phil Ford fell to the Rockets in five games, and the Rockets would break into the NBA Finals for the first time, the first of four in franchise history. It would be the only time two conference finalists in the playoffs both had losing records, and the second and last time to date a team with a losing record made it all the way to the Finals round (the first being the 1959 Minneapolis Lakers).

=== Boston Celtics ===
This was the Celtics' first appearance in The Finals since their 1976 championship winning team against the Phoenix Suns. The Celtics were not quite the same team as five years before, as they added the likes of Larry Bird, Robert Parish, and Kevin McHale, a trio that would come to be known as "The Big Three". M. L. Carr, Cedric Maxwell, and Nate Archibald were also capable players off the bench, and key cogs in Boston's balanced offensive attack. However, the Celtics lost future Hall of Famers Dave Cowens and JoJo White to retirement. Still, the Celtics, led by Bird, won 62 games and managed to squeak past Philadelphia for the league's best record due to tiebreakers.

The Celtics's playoff run started with a first-round bye, straight into the conference semifinals. Despite the layoff, the Celtics easily swept the Artis Gilmore-led Chicago Bulls, and then faced the defending Eastern Conference champion Philadelphia 76ers for the right to advance to The Finals. After a hard-fought and physical series, the Celtics eventually came back from a three-games-to-one deficit to defeat the Sixers, repeating a feat they accomplished in 1968. Five of the games in the series ended with the winning team on top by two points or less, including a 91–90 nail-biter in Game 7.

Both teams had met in the playoffs the year earlier, when the Rockets were in their final season in the Eastern Conference. The 1980 Eastern Conference semifinal matchup had a slightly different Celtics team, with Hall of Fame center Dave Cowens still playing for the team, as well not featuring perennial stars Kevin McHale and Robert Parish, both of whom would not arrive in Boston until the 1981 season. Rick Barry for Houston was also in the final season of his career in 1980. The Celtics blew out the Rockets in a four-game sweep, by a total of 74 points in the 1980 Eastern Conference semis.

=== Road to the Finals ===
Houston Rockets (Western Conference champion)		Boston Celtics (Eastern Conference champion)
# / Western Conference; # / Team / W / L / PCT / GB; 1 / c-Phoenix Suns / 57 / 25 / .695 / –; 2 / y-San Antonio Spurs / 52 / 30 / .634 / 5; 3 / x-Los Angeles Lakers / 54 / 28 / .659 / 3; 4 / x-Portland Trail Blazers / 45 / 37 / .549 / 12; 5 / x-Kansas City Kings / 40 / 42 / .488 / 17; 6 / x-Houston Rockets / 40 / 42 / .488 / 17; 7 / Golden State Warriors / 39 / 43 / .476 / 18; 8 / Denver Nuggets / 37 / 45 / .451 / 20; 9 / San Diego Clippers / 36 / 46 / .439 / 21; 10 / Seattle SuperSonics / 34 / 48 / .415 / 23; 11 / Utah Jazz / 28 / 54 / .341 / 29; 12 / Dallas Mavericks / 15 / 67 / .183 / 42; 6th seed in the West, 12th best league record	Regular season	# / Eastern Conference; # / Team / W / L / PCT / GB; 1 / z-Boston Celtics / 62 / 20 / .756 / –; 2 / y-Milwaukee Bucks / 60 / 22 / .732 / 2; 3 / x-Philadelphia 76ers / 62 / 20 / .756 / –; 4 / x-New York Knicks / 50 / 32 / .610 / 12; 5 / x-Chicago Bulls / 45 / 37 / .549 / 17; 6 / x-Indiana Pacers / 44 / 38 / .537 / 18; 7 / Washington Bullets / 39 / 43 / .476 / 23; 8 / Atlanta Hawks / 31 / 51 / .378 / 31; 9 / Cleveland Cavaliers / 28 / 54 / .341 / 34; 10 / New Jersey Nets / 24 / 58 / .293 / 38; 11 / Detroit Pistons / 21 / 61 / .256 / 41; 1st seed in the East, best league record
Defeated the (3) Los Angeles Lakers, 2–1	First round	Earned first-round bye
Defeated the (2) San Antonio Spurs, 4–3	Conference semifinals	Defeated the (5) Chicago Bulls, 4–0
Defeated the (5) Kansas City Kings, 4–1	Conference finals	Defeated the (2) Philadelphia 76ers, 4–3

(*)The Celtics were tied with the Philadelphia 76ers for the NBA's best record, but the Celtics earned the division title and the overall top seed based on tie-breakers.

=== Regular season series ===
The Boston Celtics won both games in the regular season series:

December 19, 1980

Houston Rockets 119, Boston Celtics 133

Boston Garden, Boston

March 4, 1981

Boston Celtics 108, Houston Rockets 101

The Summit, Houston, Texas

== Series summary ==
Game	Date	Home team	Result	Road team
Game 1	May 5	Boston Celtics	98–95 (1–0)	Houston Rockets
Game 2	May 7	Boston Celtics	90–92 (1–1)	Houston Rockets
Game 3	May 9	Houston Rockets	71–94 (1–2)	Boston Celtics
Game 4	May 10	Houston Rockets	91–86 (2–2)	Boston Celtics
Game 5	May 12	Boston Celtics	109–80 (3–2)	Houston Rockets
Game 6	May 14	Houston Rockets	91–102 (2–4)	Boston Celtics

== Game summaries ==
=== Game 1 ===
CBS

May 5
7:35 p.m. EDT

Houston Rockets 95, Boston Celtics 98
Scoring by quarter: 29–24, 28–27, 24–25, 14–22
Pts: Robert Reid 27; Rebs: Moses Malone 15; Asts: Mike Dunleavy 7	Pts: Larry Bird 18; Rebs: Larry Bird 21; Asts: Larry Bird 9
Boston leads the series, 1–0

Boston Garden, Boston
Attendance: 15,320
Referees:
- No. 10 Darell Garretson
- No. 9 John Vanak

No one figured this series to be much of a Finals. Houston, in fact, had lost its previous dozen games to the Celtics, including a 4–0 series sweep in the previous years' playoffs. But Malone, who had averaged nearly 28 points and 15 rebounds over the season, would have none of the "Boston Curse". He came into the series fired up, going so far as to call the Celtics "chumps". The Celtics, meanwhile, were coming off three close games in the Eastern Conference finals in upsetting the heavily favored Philadelphia 76ers. So, the Celtics were tired and flat.

Houston led 57–51 at the half and kept that intensity through the game. Late in the fourth period, with the Celtics trailing 87–84, Bird put up an 18-footer from the right side. As soon as he turned it loose, he immediately rushed in for the rebound. He caught the ball in midair as his momentum was carrying him out of bounds on the baseline just right of the lane. In an instant, he switched the ball to his left hand (a right-handed shot would have hit the side of the backboard) and flipped it in the basket. Bird would finish with 18 points, 21 rebounds, and nine assists. Moses Malone would grab 15 rebounds, but was held to 13 points.

The crowd went nuts over Bird's shot, with general manager Red Auerbach leading the cheers. Bill Russell, who was broadcasting the game for CBS, looked on in disbelief.

The shot carried Boston to a 98–95 win and Auerbach proclaimed, "It was one of the best shots I've ever seen a player make."

=== Game 2 ===
CBS

May 7
7:35 p.m. EDT

Houston Rockets 92, Boston Celtics 90
Scoring by quarter: 22–26, 23–23, 23–19, 24–22
Pts: Moses Malone 31; Rebs: Moses Malone 15; Asts: Reid, Tom Henderson, Leavell 3 each	Pts: Larry Bird 19; Rebs: Larry Bird 21; Asts: Archibald, Gerald Henderson 4 each
Series tied, 1–1

Boston Garden, Boston
Attendance: 15,320
Referees:
- No. 11 Jake O'Donnell
- No. 4 Ed T. Rush

Malone would come up big in this game, scoring 31 points and pulling down another 15 boards. Bill Willoughby would add 14 off the bench to make up for poor shooting by Robert Reid (0 for 7) and Calvin Murphy (4 for 13). Reserve guard Allen Leavell's late basket would give the Rockets the 92–90 victory. Bird would lead the Celtics once again with 19 points and 21 rebounds. The victory was Houston's eighth road win of the playoffs, a record that stood until the 1995 Rockets won nine playoff games en route to winning the championship.

=== Game 3 ===
CBS

May 9
2:35 p.m. CDT

Boston Celtics 94, Houston Rockets 71
Scoring by quarter: 21–17, 20–13, 24–18, 29–23
Pts: Cedric Maxwell 19; Rebs: Larry Bird 13; Asts: Larry Bird 10	Pts: Moses Malone 23; Rebs: Moses Malone 15; Asts: Malone, Reid, Leavell 2 each
Boston leads the series, 2–1

The Summit, Houston, Texas
Attendance: 16,121
Referees:
- No. 9 John Vanak
- No. 12 Earl Strom

With the series back in Houston, Robert Reid, matched up with Larry Bird, would begin to garner attention for his defense on the Celtics star, holding him to three baskets and eight points. But, the Celtics would not need Bird's scoring in this one. The Rockets shot a paltry 3 for 17 in the second quarter, fell behind by 17, and never recovered.

The Celtics had six players who scored in double figures, led by Cedric Maxwell with 19 points. His teammates, meanwhile, played some pretty good defense of their own, holding the Rockets to 71 points, the lowest output for an NBA team in a Finals game since the Syracuse Nationals scored 71 in the 1955 NBA Finals (which was, incidentally, the year the shot clock was introduced). The record low stood until it was shattered by the Utah Jazz in Game 3 of the 1998 Finals when they lost 96–54 to Chicago Bulls.

=== Game 4 ===
CBS

May 10
12:05 p.m. CDT

Boston Celtics 86, Houston Rockets 91
Scoring by quarter: 26–26, 24–24, 17–25, 19–16
Pts: Cedric Maxwell 24; Rebs: Cedric Maxwell 14; Asts: Larry Bird 7	Pts: Mike Dunleavy 28; Rebs: Moses Malone 22; Asts: Tom Henderson 9
Series tied, 2–2

The Summit, Houston, Texas
Attendance: 16,121
Referees:
- No. 10 Darell Garretson
- No. 4 Ed T. Rush

Reid continued his air-tight defense on Bird, holding him to another eight points, while scoring 19 himself. The star of this game was Mike Dunleavy, Sr., who had 28 points. Malone would add 24 points and 22 rebounds as the Rockets tied the series. Another key was the Rockets' relentless offensive rebounding and second-chance opportunities; they grabbed 28 offensive rebounds (Reid had 10 and Malone nine with four put-back dunks) on the way to out-shooting the Celtics in attempts, 103 to 74.

=== Game 5 ===
CBS

May 12
9:05 p.m. EDT

Houston Rockets 80, Boston Celtics 109
Scoring by quarter: 19–34, 18–25, 18–18, 25–32
Pts: Moses Malone 20; Rebs: Moses Malone 11; Asts: Allen Leavell 6	Pts: Cedric Maxwell 28; Rebs: Cedric Maxwell 15; Asts: Larry Bird 8
Boston leads the series, 3–2

Boston Garden, Boston
Attendance: 15,320
Referees:
No. 12 Earl Strom
No. 22 Paul Mihalik
No. 7 Joe Gushue (alternate)

The Rockets had a losing regular season record at 40–42, but, up to Game 5, they showed they definitely belonged in the finals with the Celtics. So, no one could blame Moses Malone for doing some trash-talking. Earlier, he had simply declared, "Boston ain't that good." Before Game 5, though, Malone went a little too far, saying, "I could get four guys off the street in Petersburg (Virginia, Malone's hometown) and beat them."

Malone's word would prove to motivate the Celtics. With Bird still struggling offensively, Cedric Maxwell shouldered the load, scoring 28 points and pulling down 15 rebounds and sparking several fast breaks to a Celtics rout, 109–80.

The infamous on-air incident between Rick Barry and Bill Russell occurred early in the third quarter of this game.

=== Game 6 ===
CBS

May 14
9:05 p.m. CDT

Boston Celtics 102, Houston Rockets 91
Scoring by quarter: 25–24, 28–23, 29–20, 20–24
Pts: Larry Bird 27; Rebs: Larry Bird 13; Asts: Nate Archibald 12	Pts: Robert Reid 27; Rebs: Moses Malone 16; Asts: Tom Henderson, Reid 5 each
Boston wins the series, 4–2

The Summit, Houston, Texas
Attendance: 16,121
Referees:
- No. 11 Jake O'Donnell
- No. 14 Jack Madden

Motivated from Malone's previous barbs, the Celtics took it right to the Rockets back at The Summit, leading 84–67 in the final period. However, as coach Fitch looked on in disgust, the Celtics went five minutes without a basket as the Rockets, led by Calvin Garrett, reeled off 13 unanswered points in a furious comeback and eventually cut the lead to only three, with the Houston crowd erupting louder after each basket. Larry Bird then finally broke out of his shooting doldrums to personally blunt the Rockets' rally. Bird hit a 15-foot jumper, fed series MVP Maxwell for a basket, and hit a back-breaking, 24-foot, three-point shot to put the Rockets away for good and send Boston to its 14th NBA Championship, and at last a championship ring for 11-year veteran Nate Archibald.

As of 2026, this is the most recent time the Celtics have clinched a championship on the road, with each of their next four titles being won at home.

== Player statistics ==
Legend
GP	Games played	GS	Games started	MPG	Minutes per game
FG%	Field-goal percentage	3P%	3-point field-goal percentage	FT%	Free-throw percentage
RPG	Rebounds per game	APG	Assists per game	SPG	Steals per game
BPG	Blocks per game	PPG	Points per game

Boston Celtics

Boston Celtics statistics
Player	GP	GS	MPG	FG%	3P%	FT%	RPG	APG	SPG	BPG	PPG
Chris Ford	6	6	30.7	.500	.222	.778	2.7	2.3	0.7	0.0	10.5
Cedric Maxwell	6	6	37.8	.568	.000	.759	9.5	2.8	0.2	1.0	17.7
Larry Bird	6	6	42.8	.419	.333	.813	15.3	7.0	2.3	0.5	15.3
Kevin McHale	6	0	13.8	.387	.000	.571	3.3	0.8	0.0	0.7	4.7
Tiny Archibald	6	6	33.8	.364	.000	.875	1.2	5.5	0.7	0.0	10.3
Rick Robey	6	0	16.3	.559	.000	.563	3.7	0.3	0.0	0.2	7.8
Gerald Henderson	6	0	15.8	.559	.000	.833	1.7	1.7	0.7	0.3	7.2
Robert Parish	6	6	27.8	.506	.000	.632	7.7	1.0	1.2	2.0	15.0
M.L. Carr	6	0	18.3	.459	.000	.750	1.7	1.0	0.7	0.7	4.7
Terry Duerod	4	0	1.5	.429	.000	.000	0.0	0.0	0.3	0.0	1.5
Eric Fernsten	4	0	2.5	.000	.000	.667	1.0	0.3	0.3	0.0	0.5

Houston Rockets

Houston Rockets statistics
Player	GP	GS	MPG	FG%	3P%	FT%	RPG	APG	SPG	BPG	PPG
Tom Henderson	6	6	32.2	.395	.000	.733	2.2	4.2	0.7	0.2	6.8
Allen Leavell	5	0	14.6	.303	.000	.714	1.4	3.4	0.6	0.6	5.0
Robert Reid	6	6	40.7	.375	.000	.696	7.5	3.3	2.0	0.8	14.7
Mike Dunleavy	6	6	27.5	.415	.429	.800	2.3	3.2	1.7	0.2	17.7
Billy Paultz	6	6	32.7	.403	.000	.625	6.0	1.3	1.2	0.7	11.2
Moses Malone	6	6	44.8	.403	.000	.673	15.7	1.3	0.8	2.2	22.3
Bill Willoughby	6	0	22.3	.269	.000	.739	4.5	1.2	1.0	0.8	7.5
Calvin Murphy	4	0	22.0	.395	.000	.833	1.0	0.8	1.0	0.0	9.8
Calvin Garrett	4	0	10.8	.556	.000	1.000	1.8	0.3	0.5	0.3	3.0
Major Jones	3	0	6.0	.500	.000	.333	1.7	0.3	0.3	0.3	3.0
Rudy Tomjanovich	3	0	5.7	.125	.000	.000	1.3	0.0	0.0	0.0	0.7

== Television coverage ==
- The 1981 NBA Finals received the lowest television rating in history up to that point, with a 6.7 rating. (It would remain the lowest ever until the 2003 Finals between the San Antonio Spurs and New Jersey Nets drew a 6.5 rating.) Due to this, the 1981 finals were the last to be broadcast on tape-delay, with weeknight games airing after the late local news in most cities. Games 3 and 4 were played back-to-back on Saturday and Sunday, May 9 and 10, to give CBS two live Finals games; it is the last time Finals games were played on consecutive days. Game 3 was the last Finals contest played on a Saturday until Game 5 in 2021. Game 4 tipped off at noon Central (1 p.m. Eastern/10 a.m. Pacific) in order for CBS to telecast golf following the game. Had Game 7 been played, it would have tipped off at 1 p.m. Eastern.
- Following the Finals, Gary Bender became the lead play-by-play announcer for CBS' coverage of the NCAA Division I men's basketball tournament, while Rick Barry's contract, following his questionable racial comments about Bill Russell during the Finals, was not renewed. Russell would remain the main color analyst for the next two years alongside newly promoted main play-by-play commentator Dick Stockton. Curiously, Barry and Russell would reunite, this time on the NBA on TBS for two seasons beginning in the 1984–85 season. Russell was replaced as CBS' lead analyst following the 1983 Finals by former Celtics teammate Tom Heinsohn.
- Brent Musburger narrated the duration of the 1981 NBA Playoffs on film, known as "The Dynasty Renewed". The 1981 film was expanded from 30 minutes to one hour, with more highlights from rounds prior to the finals.

== Team rosters ==
=== Boston Celtics ===
1980–81 Boston Celtics roster
Players

Pos.	No.	Player	Height	Weight	DOB	From
G	7	Nate Archibald	6 ft 1 in (1.85 m)	170 lb (77 kg)	1948–09–02	UTEP
F	33	Larry Bird	6 ft 9 in (2.06 m)	220 lb (100 kg)	1956–12–07	Indiana State
F	30	M.L. Carr	6 ft 6 in (1.98 m)	205 lb (93 kg)	1951–01–09	Guilford
G	40	Terry Duerod	6 ft 2 in (1.88 m)	180 lb (82 kg)	1956–07–29	Detroit Mercy
C	45	Eric Fernsten	6 ft 10 in (2.08 m)	205 lb (93 kg)	1953–11–01	San Francisco
G	42	Chris Ford	6 ft 5 in (1.96 m)	190 lb (86 kg)	1949–01–11	Villanova
G	43	Gerald Henderson	6 ft 2 in (1.88 m)	175 lb (79 kg)	1956–01–16	VCU
F	31	Cedric Maxwell	6 ft 8 in (2.03 m)	205 lb (93 kg)	1955–11–21	Charlotte
F	32	Kevin McHale	6 ft 10 in (2.08 m)	210 lb (95 kg)	1957–12–19	Minnesota
C	00	Robert Parish	7 ft 0 in (2.13 m)	230 lb (104 kg)	1953–08–30	Centenary
C	53	Rick Robey	6 ft 11 in (2.11 m)	230 lb (104 kg)	1956–01–30	Kentucky

Coaches
Head coach
- (United States) Bill Fitch (Coe College)
Assistant(s)
- (United States) K.C. Jones (San Francisco)
- (United States) Jimmy Rodgers (Ohio State)

Legend
- (DP) Unsigned draft pick
- (FA) Free agent
- (S) Suspended
- Injured

=== Houston Rockets ===
1980–81 Houston Rockets roster
Players

Pos.	No.	Player	Height	Weight	DOB	From
G	10	Mike Dunleavy Sr.	6 ft 3 in (1.91 m)	180 lb (82 kg)	1954–03–21	South Carolina
F	00	Calvin Garrett	6 ft 7 in (2.01 m)	190 lb (86 kg)	1956–07–11	Oral Roberts
G	6	Tom Henderson	6 ft 3 in (1.91 m)	190 lb (86 kg)	1952–01–26	Hawaiʻi
F	11	Major Jones	6 ft 9 in (2.06 m)	225 lb (102 kg)	1953–07–09	Albany State
G	30	Allen Leavell	6 ft 1 in (1.85 m)	170 lb (77 kg)	1957–05–27	Oklahoma City
C	24	Moses Malone	6 ft 10 in (2.08 m)	260 lb (118 kg)	1955–03–23	Petersburg HS (VA)
G	23	Calvin Murphy	5 ft 9 in (1.75 m)	165 lb (75 kg)	1948–05–09	Niagara
C	5	Billy Paultz	6 ft 11 in (2.11 m)	235 lb (107 kg)	1948–07–30	St. John's
F	50	Robert Reid	6 ft 8 in (2.03 m)	228 lb (103 kg)	1955–08–30	St. Mary's (TX)
F	45	Rudy Tomjanovich	6 ft 8 in (2.03 m)	228 lb (103 kg)	1948–11–24	Michigan
F	32	Bill Willoughby	6 ft 8 in (2.03 m)	205 lb (93 kg)	1957–05–20	Dwight Morrow HS (NJ)

Coaches
Head coach
- (United States) Del Harris (Milligan)
Assistant(s)
- (United States) Herb Brown (Vermont)
- (United States) Carroll Dawson (Baylor)

Legend
- (DP) Unsigned draft pick
- (FA) Free agent
- (S) Suspended
- Injured

== Aftermath ==
At the team's championship parade, Bird continued the verbal back and forth with Malone. "I think after all the hollering and screaming, I look out in the crowd and see one thing (a large printed sign) that typifies our season." Bird confirmed the sign's message, joking that 'Moses does eat s--t.'

Moses Malone would win his second Most Valuable Player award in 1981–82; however, the Rockets could not build on their miracle playoff run from 1981 and were eliminated in the first round by the Seattle SuperSonics the following year. In the 1982 off-season, he was traded to the Philadelphia 76ers, who had just lost the Finals to the Lakers. His addition to the already stacked team of Julius Erving, Maurice Cheeks, Andrew Toney, and Bobby Jones, led the 76ers to run away with the Eastern Conference. In the 1983 NBA Finals, they swept the Lakers in a rematch from 1982, with Malone winning Finals MVP (he also won the league's regular season MVP).

With the loss of Malone, the Rockets quickly fell to the bottom of the standings. They selected Ralph Sampson and Hakeem Olajuwon in back-to-back drafts in 1983 and 1984. Sampson at 7'4 and Olajuwon at 7'0 formed a Twin Towers frontcourt. They helped lead the Rockets to their second NBA Finals appearance of the decade in 1986, which they coincidentally also lost to the Celtics in six games. Only Robert Reid and Allen Leavell remained on the Houston Rockets for both the 1981 and 1986 NBA Finals, while the core of Bird, McHale, and Parrish were still there for the 1986 Celtics. The Rockets did not win an NBA championship until 1994.

== See also ==
- 1981 NBA playoffs
