= Gerald Henderson =

American basketball player (born 1956)

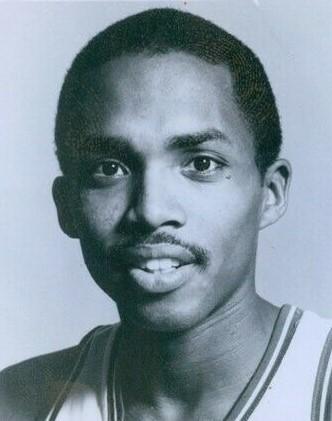
- Henderson in 1983

Personal information
- Born: January 16, 1956 (age 70) Richmond, Virginia, U.S.
- Listed height: 6 ft 2 in (1.88 m)
- Listed weight: 175 lb (79 kg)

Career information
- High school: Huguenot (Richmond, Virginia)
- College: VCU (1974–1978)
- NBA draft: 1978: 3rd round, 64th overall pick
- Drafted by: San Antonio Spurs
- Playing career: 1978–1992
- Position: Point guard
- Number: 43, 15, 7, 12, 10, 9

Career history
- 1978–1979: Tucson Gunners
- 1979–1984: Boston Celtics
- 1984–1986: Seattle SuperSonics
- 1986–1987: New York Knicks
- 1987–1989: Philadelphia 76ers
- 1989: Milwaukee Bucks
- 1989–1991: Detroit Pistons
- 1991–1992: Houston Rockets
- 1992: Detroit Pistons

Career highlights
- 3× NBA champion (1981, 1984, 1990); No. 22 jersey retired by VCU Rams

Career NBA statistics
- Points: 7,773 (8.9 ppg)
- Rebounds: 1,453 (1.7 rpg)
- Assists: 3,141 (3.6 apg)
- Stats at NBA.com
- Stats at Basketball Reference

Jerome McKinley "Gerald" Henderson Sr. (born January 16, 1956) is an American former professional basketball player. He was a combo guard who had a 13-year career in the National Basketball Association (NBA) from 1979 until 1992. He played for the Boston Celtics, Seattle SuperSonics, New York Knicks, Philadelphia 76ers, Milwaukee Bucks, Detroit Pistons, and Houston Rockets. Henderson was born in Richmond, Virginia and attended Virginia Commonwealth University.

Henderson is best known for his steal of a James Worthy pass to score a game-tying layup in Game 2 of the 1984 NBA Finals between the Boston Celtics and the Los Angeles Lakers. The Celtics eventually prevailed in overtime. In a post-game interview, Henderson said that "For a minute I could hear Johnny Most going, 'Henderson steals the ball!'", in reference to Most's famous call of John Havlicek's steal in the 1965 Eastern Conference finals. Most's actual words were "It goes quickly in now to Magic, back over to Worthy, and it's picked off! Goes to Henderson, he lays it up and in! It's all tied up! A great play by Henderson!"

In the fall of 1984, Henderson was traded to Seattle for the Sonics' first-round pick in 1986, which the Celtics would use to draft Len Bias. He then played for the New York Knicks, Philadelphia 76ers, and Milwaukee Bucks in a three-year span before joining the Detroit Pistons before the 1989–90 season. In Game 4 of that year's NBA Finals, with the Pistons holding a one-point lead over the Trail Blazers, Henderson made a fast-break layup with just over a second to play to push the lead to three points instead of dribbling out the clock. The decision nearly backfired when Portland's Danny Young appeared to make a game-tying desperation three-pointer, but the officials correctly ruled that Young's shot was released just after the buzzer. The Pistons took a 3–1 series lead and won the next game to give Henderson his third NBA championship.

As of 2006, he and his wife run a real estate business in Blue Bell, Pennsylvania. Their son, Gerald Henderson Jr. was selected by the Charlotte Bobcats of the National Basketball Association in the 2009 NBA draft. Gerald Jr. played eight NBA seasons for the Charlotte Bobcats/Hornets, Portland Trail Blazers, and Philadelphia 76ers.

In 2012, Henderson was inducted into the Virginia Sports Hall of Fame.

== NBA career statistics ==
Legend
GP	Games played	GS	Games started	MPG	Minutes per game
FG%	Field goal percentage	3P%	3-point field goal percentage	FT%	Free throw percentage
RPG	Rebounds per game	APG	Assists per game	SPG	Steals per game
BPG	Blocks per game	PPG	Points per game	**Bold**	Career high
†	Won an NBA championship	*	Led the league

=== Regular season ===
Year	Team	GP	GS	MPG	FG%	3P%	FT%	RPG	APG	SPG	BPG	PPG
1979–80	Boston	76	2	14.0	.500	.333	.690	1.1	1.9	0.6	**0.2**	6.2
1980–81†	Boston	**82**	10	19.6	.451	.063	.720	1.6	2.6	1.0	0.1	7.8
1981–82	Boston	**82**	31	22.5	.501	.167	.727	1.9	3.1	1.0	0.1	10.2
1982–83	Boston	**82**	9	18.9	.463	.188	.722	1.5	2.4	1.2	0.0	8.2
1983–84†	Boston	78	78	26.8	**.524**	.351	.768	1.9	3.8	1.5	**0.2**	11.6
1984–85	Seattle	79	78	**33.5**	.479	.237	.780	**2.4**	**7.1**	**1.8**	0.1	**13.4**
1985–86	Seattle	**82**	**82**	31.3	.482	.346	.830	2.3	5.9	1.7	0.1	13.1
1986–87	Seattle	6	6	25.8	.500	.000	.944	1.5	5.3	1.0	0.0	11.2
1986–87	New York	68	53	27.8	.438	.257	.816	**2.4**	6.5	1.4	**0.2**	10.9
1987–88	New York	6	2	11.5	.357	.500	**1.000**	1.7	2.2	0.3	0.0	2.3
1987–88	Philadelphia	69	3	20.8	.431	.421	.810	1.4	3.2	1.0	0.1	8.4
1988–89	Philadelphia	65	0	15.2	.414	.308	.819	1.0	2.2	0.6	0.0	6.5
1989–90	Milwaukee	11	0	11.7	.423	.429	**1.000**	1.1	1.2	0.7	0.0	2.5
1989–90†	Detroit	46	0	7.3	.506	.452	.769	0.7	1.3	0.2	0.0	2.3
1990–91	Detroit	23	10	17.0	.427	.333	.762	1.6	2.7	0.5	0.1	5.3
1991–92	Houston	8	0	4.3	.364	.000	.667	0.3	0.6	0.0	0.0	1.5
1991–92	Detroit	8	0	7.8	.381	**.600**	**1.000**	0.8	0.6	0.4	0.0	3.0
Career		871	364	21.6	.472	.332	.776	1.7	3.6	1.1	0.1	8.9

=== Playoffs ===
Year	Team	GP	GS	MPG	FG%	3P%	FT%	RPG	APG	SPG	BPG	PPG
1979–80	Boston	9	–	11.2	.405	.000	.600	1.1	1.3	0.4	0.0	4.7
1980–81†	Boston	16	–	14.3	.477	.000	.833	1.6	1.6	0.6	**0.2**	5.8
1981–82	Boston	12	–	25.8	.409	.000	.686	2.1	4.0	1.2	**0.2**	8.3
1982–83	Boston	7	–	26.7	.412	.000	**.857**	2.0	**4.4**	**1.6**	0.1	10.9
1983–84†	Boston	**23***	–	**26.8**	**.485**	.273	.720	**2.3**	4.2	1.5	0.0	**12.5**
1988–89	Philadelphia	3	0	23.0	.400	**.286**	.333	**2.3**	1.7	0.7	0.0	8.0
1989–90†	Detroit	8	0	2.4	.200	.000	.000	0.4	0.5	0.3	0.0	0.3
1990–91	Detroit	10	**1**	4.0	.250	.000	.000	0.1	0.6	0.1	0.0	0.8
Career		88	1	17.8	.443	.156	.697	1.6	2.6	0.9	0.1	7.2
