= 1984 NBA Finals =

1984 basketball championship series

Team	Coach	Wins
Boston Celtics	K.C. Jones	4
Los Angeles Lakers	Pat Riley	3
- Dates: May 27–June 12
- MVP: Larry Bird (Boston Celtics)
- Hall of Famers: Celtics: Larry Bird (1998); Dennis Johnson (2010); Kevin McHale (1999); Robert Parish (2003); Lakers: Kareem Abdul-Jabbar (1995); Michael Cooper (2024); Magic Johnson (2002); Bob McAdoo (2000); Jamaal Wilkes (2012); James Worthy (2003); Coaches: K.C. Jones (1989, player); Pat Riley (2008); Officials: Darell Garretson (2016); Hugh Evans (2022); Earl Strom (1995)
- Eastern finals: Celtics defeated Bucks, 4–1
- Western finals: Lakers defeated Suns, 4–2

The 1984 NBA World Championship Series was the championship round of the National Basketball Association's (NBA) 1983–84 season, and the culmination of the season's playoffs. The Eastern Conference champion Boston Celtics defeated the Western Conference champion Los Angeles Lakers in seven games to win their fifteenth NBA championship. Celtics forward Larry Bird averaged 27 points and 14 rebounds a game during the series, earning the NBA Finals Most Valuable Player (MVP). The 1984 NBA Finals has been often regarded as one of the greatest finals ever played, and is considered the "peak" of the 1980s Celtics-Lakers rivalry.

This series was a rematch of the Los Angeles Lakers and Boston Celtics after their rivalry was revived in 1979 with the Magic Johnson–Larry Bird pair entering the league. After alternating wins with the Lakers, the Celtics won Game 7 and the series with a score of 111–102.

This was the last NBA Finals to use the 2–2–1–1–1 format until 2014. The following year, the NBA Finals format was changed to 2–3–2 after Celtics president Red Auerbach complained to NBA Commissioner David Stern about the constant travel during the Finals (at the time, all NBA teams still traveled primarily by commercial aircraft, and players were sometimes forced to cram themselves into coach seats if first or business class seats were not available).

Although the 2–2–1–1–1 format remained intact for the remainder of the playoff rounds, the 2–3–2 format would be used up through 2013. As of 2025, MLB is the only major professional sports league to retain the 2–3–2 format for its playoff series.

== Background ==
The seeds of the 1984 Finals were first sown five years earlier, during the 1979 NCAA Men's Division I Basketball Tournament. In the final game of the tournament, Larry Bird and his erstwhile unbeaten Indiana State Sycamores lost to Magic Johnson and his Michigan State Spartans by the score of 75–64. After the tournament, both entered the NBA in the 1979–80 season with high expectations. Bird, who was selected 6th in the 1978 NBA draft but committed back to Indiana State for his senior season, was named Rookie of the Year after leading the Celtics to a 32-game turnaround from the previous year, going from 29 to 61 wins. The expected Celtics–Lakers finals, however, never happened. The Philadelphia 76ers defeated the Celtics in the conference finals before losing to the Lakers in the 1980 NBA Finals, with Johnson earning Finals MVP honors for his Game 6 performance. Since then Bird won a championship in 1981, then Magic led the Lakers to the finals in 1982 and 1983, winning in the former.

The series was the eighth time in NBA history that the Celtics and Lakers met in the NBA finals, with Boston winning each of the previous seven.

=== Boston Celtics ===
In the 1983–84 season, the Celtics won 62 games to lead the league. The Celtics were led by Bird, who won his first MVP award, and was complemented by 1981 Finals MVP Cedric Maxwell, first-time all-star and Sixth Man Award winner Kevin McHale, Robert Parish, Gerald Henderson and Danny Ainge. Boston's most crucial addition was Dennis Johnson, whom they acquired from the Phoenix Suns in the offseason in hopes of addressing their porous back-court defense.

In the playoffs, the Celtics defeated the Washington Bullets in four, the New York Knicks in seven, and the Milwaukee Bucks in five.

=== Los Angeles Lakers ===
The Lakers were coming off a four-game sweep by the Philadelphia 76ers in the previous year's finals. Before the season began, the Lakers traded long-time guard Norm Nixon to the San Diego Clippers in exchange for the draft rights to Byron Scott. The trade signaled a transition period, as some of the key players from the first two championships gave way to younger talent. Despite the changes, it did not stop the Lakers from finishing with the best record (54–28) in the Western Conference, powered by their one-two punch of Kareem Abdul-Jabbar and Magic Johnson.

During the playoffs, the Lakers defeated the Kansas City Kings in three, the Dallas Mavericks in five, and the Phoenix Suns in six. However, the Lakers suffered a key injury when their 3rd leading scorer, Jamaal Wilkes (17 PPG) was ruled out of the finals. This cost the Lakers valuable depth, as James Worthy, a key contributor off the bench, would now have to start in Wilkes' place.

=== Road to the Finals ===
Los Angeles Lakers (Western Conference champion)		Boston Celtics (Eastern Conference champion)
# / Western Conference; # / Team / W / L / PCT / GB; 1 / c-Los Angeles Lakers / 54 / 28 / .659 / –; 2 / y-Utah Jazz / 45 / 37 / .549 / 9; 3 / x-Portland Trail Blazers / 48 / 34 / .585 / 6; 4 / x-Dallas Mavericks / 43 / 39 / .524 / 11; 5 / x-Seattle SuperSonics / 42 / 40 / .512 / 12; 6 / x-Phoenix Suns / 41 / 41 / .500 / 13; 7 / x-Denver Nuggets / 38 / 44 / .463 / 16; 8 / x-Kansas City Kings / 38 / 44 / .463 / 16; 9 / San Antonio Spurs / 37 / 45 / .451 / 17; 10 / Golden State Warriors / 37 / 45 / .451 / 17; 11 / San Diego Clippers / 30 / 52 / .366 / 24; 12 / Houston Rockets / 29 / 53 / .354 / 25; 1st seed in the West, 2nd best league record	Regular season	# / Eastern Conference; # / Team / W / L / PCT / GB; 1 / z-Boston Celtics / 62 / 20 / .756 / –; 2 / y-Milwaukee Bucks / 50 / 32 / .610 / 12; 3 / x-Philadelphia 76ers / 52 / 30 / .634 / 10; 4 / x-Detroit Pistons / 49 / 33 / .598 / 13; 5 / x-New York Knicks / 47 / 35 / .573 / 15; 6 / x-New Jersey Nets / 45 / 37 / .549 / 17; 7 / x-Atlanta Hawks / 40 / 42 / .488 / 22; 8 / x-Washington Bullets / 35 / 47 / .427 / 27; 9 / Cleveland Cavaliers / 28 / 54 / .341 / 34; 10 / Chicago Bulls / 27 / 55 / .329 / 35; 11 / Indiana Pacers / 26 / 56 / .317 / 36; 1st seed in the East, best league record
Defeated the (8) Kansas City Kings, 3–0	First round	Defeated the (8) Washington Bullets, 3–1
Defeated the (4) Dallas Mavericks, 4–1	Conference semifinals	Defeated the (5) New York Knicks, 4–3
Defeated the (6) Phoenix Suns, 4–2	Conference finals	Defeated the (2) Milwaukee Bucks, 4–1

=== Regular season series ===
The Los Angeles Lakers won both games in the regular season series:

February 8, 1984

Los Angeles Lakers 111, Boston Celtics 109

Boston Garden, Boston, Massachusetts

February 24, 1984

Boston Celtics 108, Los Angeles Lakers 116

The Forum, Los Angeles, California

== Series summary ==
Game	Date	Road team	Result	Home team
Game 1	May 27	Los Angeles Lakers	115–109 (1–0)	Boston Celtics
Game 2	May 31	Los Angeles Lakers	121–124 (OT) (1–1)	Boston Celtics
Game 3	June 3	Boston Celtics	104–137 (1–2)	Los Angeles Lakers
Game 4	June 6	Boston Celtics	129–125 (OT) (2–2)	Los Angeles Lakers
Game 5	June 8	Los Angeles Lakers	103–121 (2–3)	Boston Celtics
Game 6	June 10	Boston Celtics	108–119 (3–3)	Los Angeles Lakers
Game 7	June 12	Los Angeles Lakers	102–111 (3–4)	Boston Celtics

=== Game 1 ===
CBS

May 27

Los Angeles Lakers 115, Boston Celtics 109
Scoring by quarter: 34–22, 31–30, 27–36, 23–21
Pts: Kareem Abdul-Jabbar 32; Rebs: Kareem Abdul-Jabbar 8 Asts: Magic Johnson 10	Pts: Kevin McHale 25; Rebs: Larry Bird 14; Asts: Larry Bird 5
Los Angeles leads the series, 1–0

Boston Garden, Boston, Massachusetts
Attendance: 14,890
Referees:
- No. 25 Hugh Evans
- No. 8 John Vanak

Led by Magic Johnson, the Lakers fast break offense scored 52 points en route to a 115–109 victory at Boston Garden to open the series.

=== Game 2 ===
CBS

May 31

Los Angeles Lakers 121, Boston Celtics 124 (OT)
Scoring by quarter: 26–36, 33–25, 28–29, 26–23, Overtime: 8–11
Pts: James Worthy 29; Rebs: Magic Johnson 10; Asts: Magic Johnson 10	Pts: Larry Bird 27; Rebs: Larry Bird 13; Asts: Ainge, Henderson 5 each
Series tied, 1–1

Boston Garden, Boston, Massachusetts
Attendance: 14,890
Referees:
- No. 14 Jack Madden
- No. 11 Jake O'Donnell

In Game 2, the Lakers led 113–111 with 18 seconds left when Gerald Henderson stole a James Worthy pass to score a game tying layup. The Lakers then inbounded the ball and Magic Johnson inexplicably dribbled the clock out during regulation time. With the Celtics down by one near the end of overtime, Scott Wedman hit a shot from the baseline with 14 seconds remaining to put Boston ahead. The Lakers' chance to win on the ensuing possession was thwarted by a Robert Parish steal, followed by Larry Bird sinking a pair of free throws to secure the 124–121 victory for the Celtics.

=== Game 3 ===
CBS

June 3

Boston Celtics 104, Los Angeles Lakers 137
Scoring by quarter: 26–29, 20–28, 33–47, 25–33
Pts: Larry Bird 30; Rebs: Robert Parish 12; Asts: Cedric Maxwell 5	Pts: Kareem Abdul-Jabbar 24; Rebs: Magic Johnson 11; Asts: Magic Johnson 21
Los Angeles lead the series, 2–1

The Forum, Inglewood, California
Attendance: 17,505
Referees:
- No. 22 Paul Mihalak
- No. 12 Earl Strom

In Game 3, the Lakers raced to an easy 137–104 victory as Magic Johnson dished out 21 assists, an NBA Finals record. After the game, Larry Bird said his team played like "sissies" in an attempt to light a fire under his teammates. It was Boston's worst playoff defeat in franchise history to that date.

=== Game 4 ===
CBS

June 6

Boston Celtics 129, Los Angeles Lakers 125 (OT)
Scoring by quarter: 32–33, 26–35, 30–22, 25–23, Overtime: 16–12
Pts: Larry Bird 29; Rebs: Larry Bird 21; Asts: Dennis Johnson 14	Pts: Kareem Abdul-Jabbar 32; Rebs: Magic Johnson 11; Asts: Magic Johnson 17
Series tied, 2–2

The Forum, Inglewood, California
Attendance: 17,505
Referees:
- No. 10 Darell Garretson
- No. 20 Jess Kersey

In Game 4, the Lakers had a five-point game lead with less than a minute to play, but made several execution errors, including Magic Johnson's bad pass to Robert Parish late in the fourth quarter, and missing two crucial free throws in OT as the Celtics tied the game and then came away with a 129–125 victory in overtime. Johnson was called "Tragic Johnson" by Celtics fans due to the two crucial errors he committed in Game 4 (the Parish steal, followed by two botched free throws in OT). The Lakers took an early lead in overtime, but a controversial foul call on Kareem Abdul-Jabbar, with 16 seconds remaining in regulation, had been his 6th foul, and he was out of the game. The Laker momentum was stalled, and Larry Bird came up with a crucial jumper over Magic Johnson with 16 seconds remaining in overtime, then M.L. Carr stole James Worthy's inbounds pass followed by a dunk to seal the win. The game was also marked by Celtic forward Kevin McHale's clothesline take-down of Laker forward Kurt Rambis on a breakaway layup which triggered the physical aspect of the rivalry. Larry Bird would go after Kareem Abdul-Jabbar later on in the third quarter, and 1981 Finals MVP Cedric Maxwell further antagonized the Lakers by following a missed James Worthy free throw by crossing the lane with his hands around his own neck, symbolizing that Worthy was "choking" under pressure. Earlier in the game, Bird pushed Michael Cooper to the stands following the inbound play during the second quarter.

Game 4 of the 1984 Finals marked the last Finals game to go into overtime until Game 2 of the 1990 NBA Finals.

=== Game 5 ===
CBS

June 8

Los Angeles Lakers 103, Boston Celtics 121
Scoring by quarter: 26–26, 27–29, 24–33, 26–33
Pts: James Worthy 22; Rebs: Kurt Rambis 9 Asts: Magic Johnson 13	Pts: Larry Bird 34; Rebs: Larry Bird 17; Asts: Gerald Henderson 9
Boston leads the series, 3–2

Boston Garden, Boston, Massachusetts
Attendance: 14,890
Referees:
- No. 25 Hugh Evans
- No. 12 Earl Strom
- No. 9 John Vanak (alternate, replaced Evans)

In Game 5, the Celtics took a 3–2 series lead with a 121–103 victory, as Larry Bird scored 34 points and grabbed 17 rebounds. The game was known as the "Heat Game", as it was played under 97 °F (36 °C) heat, and without any air conditioning, at Boston Garden.The Celtics did not warm up with their sweat pants on because of extreme heat, and an oxygen tank was provided to give air to an aging Kareem Abdul-Jabbar. Referee Hugh Evans became dehydrated and fainted at one point in the first half. He worked the first half, but was replaced by John Vanak for the second half. It was also the last time that a team with home court advantage in the NBA finals played Game 5 on its own floor until 2014. The next year, the NBA Finals switched to the 2–3–2 format with Game 5 going to the team without home-court advantage, which continued through 2013.

=== Game 6 ===
CBS

June 10

Boston Celtics 108, Los Angeles Lakers 119
Scoring by quarter: 33–29, 32–30, 22–24, 21–36
Pts: Larry Bird 28; Rebs: Larry Bird 14; Asts: Larry Bird 8	Pts: Kareem Abdul-Jabbar 30; Rebs: Kareem Abdul-Jabbar 10; Asts: Magic Johnson 10
Series tied, 3–3

The Forum, Inglewood, California
Attendance: 17,505
Referees:
- No. 14 Jack Madden
- No. 11 Jake O'Donnell

In Game 6, the Lakers evened the series with a 119–108 victory. In the game the Lakers answered the Celtics' rough tactics when Laker forward James Worthy shoved Cedric Maxwell into a basket support. After the game a Laker fan threw a beer at Celtics guard M.L. Carr as he left the floor, causing him to label the series "all-out-war."

=== Game 7 ===
CBS

June 12

Los Angeles Lakers 102, Boston Celtics 111
Scoring by quarter: 30–30, 22–28, 26–33, 24–20
Pts: James Worthy 21; Rebs: Kurt Rambis 9 Asts: Magic Johnson 15	Pts: Cedric Maxwell 24; Rebs: Robert Parish 16; Asts: Cedric Maxwell 8
Boston wins the series, 4–3

Boston Garden, Boston, Massachusetts
Attendance: 14,890
Referees:
- No. 10 Darell Garretson
- No. 12 Earl Strom

In Game 7, the heat that was an issue in Game 5 was not as bad (indoor temperatures hovered around 91 °F (33 °C) during the game, due to additional fans being brought in to try to cool the air). The Celtics were led by Cedric Maxwell who had 24 points, eight rebounds and eight assists as they came away with a 111–102 victory. In the game, the Lakers rallied to cut a 14-point-deficit to three with one minute remaining when Cedric Maxwell knocked the ball away from Magic Johnson. Dennis Johnson responded by sinking two free throws to seal the victory. Larry Bird was named MVP of the series.

This was the Celtics' first championship that they claimed at home since 1966.

== Player statistics ==
Legend
GP	Games played	GS	Games started	MPG	Minutes per game
FG%	Field-goal percentage	3P%	3-point field-goal percentage	FT%	Free-throw percentage
RPG	Rebounds per game	APG	Assists per game	SPG	Steals per game
BPG	Blocks per game	PPG	Points per game

Boston Celtics

Boston Celtics statistics
Player	GP	GS	MPG	FG%	3P%	FT%	RPG	APG	SPG	BPG	PPG
Danny Ainge	7	0	14.0	.432	.250	.500	1.1	2.1	0.7	0.0	6.0
Larry Bird	7	7	43.6	.484	.667	.842	14.0	3.6	2.1	1.1	27.4
Quinn Buckner	7	0	8.0	.333	.000	.500	0.9	0.6	0.1	0.0	2.0
M. L. Carr	4	0	7.0	.364	.000	.833	0.8	0.5	0.5	0.0	3.3
Carlos Clark	3	0	3.7	.400	.000	.000	0.3	0.0	0.0	0.3	1.3
Gerald Henderson	7	7	25.6	.468	.000	.667	2.6	4.0	1.4	0.0	12.3
Dennis Johnson	7	7	36.4	.395	.500	.865	3.0	4.7	1.6	0.3	17.6
Greg Kite	4	0	3.3	.250	.000	.000	0.3	0.5	0.0	0.3	0.5
Cedric Maxwell	7	7	34.6	.458	.000	.855	5.6	3.3	1.1	0.3	13.0
Kevin McHale	7	0	30.6	.452	.000	.778	5.9	1.1	0.3	1.1	13.4
Robert Parish	7	7	36.6	.440	.000	.588	11.4	1.3	1.6	1.6	15.4
Scott Wedman	4	0	18.3	.459	.500	.000	5.3	2.5	0.0	0.0	9.3

Los Angeles Lakers

Los Angeles Lakers statistics
Player	GP	GS	MPG	FG%	3P%	FT%	RPG	APG	SPG	BPG	PPG
Kareem Abdul-Jabbar	7	7	38.9	.481	.000	.679	8.1	4.4	1.7	2.1	26.6
Michael Cooper	7	7	37.4	.468	.500	.773	3.6	5.3	1.1	0.7	13.4
Magic Johnson	7	7	42.1	.560	.000	.744	7.7	13.6	2.0	0.9	18.0
Mitch Kupchak	3	0	4.0	.500	.000	.750	2.3	2.7	0.7	0.0	0.3
Bob McAdoo	6	0	24.3	.459	.000	.655	5.5	0.7	0.3	1.3	12.5
Mike McGee	3	0	14.0	.375	.000	.714	2.7	0.0	0.7	0.3	7.7
Swen Nater	7	0	8.6	.421	.000	.857	3.1	0.0	0.0	0.1	4.0
Kurt Rambis	7	7	22.3	.629	.000	.545	6.4	0.6	0.3	0.3	7.1
Byron Scott	7	0	15.0	.474	.200	.714	1.1	0.7	1.0	0.0	6.0
Larry Spriggs	2	0	3.5	.667	.000	.000	1.0	0.5	0.0	0.0	2.0
Jamaal Wilkes	7	0	14.1	.448	.000	.750	1.9	0.4	0.3	0.0	4.6
James Worthy	7	7	39.1	.638	.000	.656	4.4	2.3	1.4	0.3	22.1

== Team rosters ==
=== Boston Celtics ===
1983–84 Boston Celtics roster
Players

Pos.	No.	Player	Height	Weight	DOB	From
G/F	44	Danny Ainge	6 ft 4 in (1.93 m)	175 lb (79 kg)	1959–03–17	BYU
F	33	Larry Bird	6 ft 9 in (2.06 m)	220 lb (100 kg)	1956–12–07	Indiana State
G	28	Quinn Buckner	6 ft 3 in (1.91 m)	190 lb (86 kg)	1954–08–20	Indiana
G/F	30	M.L. Carr	6 ft 6 in (1.98 m)	205 lb (93 kg)	1951–01–09	Guilford
G	40	Carlos Clark	6 ft 4 in (1.93 m)	210 lb (95 kg)	1960–08–10	Mississippi
G	43	Gerald Henderson	6 ft 2 in (1.88 m)	175 lb (79 kg)	1956–01–16	VCU
G	3	Dennis Johnson	6 ft 4 in (1.93 m)	182 lb (83 kg)	1954–09–18	Pepperdine
C	50	Greg Kite	6 ft 11 in (2.11 m)	250 lb (113 kg)	1961–08–05	BYU
F	31	Cedric Maxwell	6 ft 8 in (2.03 m)	205 lb (93 kg)	1955–11–21	Charlotte
F/C	32	Kevin McHale	6 ft 10 in (2.08 m)	210 lb (95 kg)	1957–12–19	Minnesota
C	00	Robert Parish	7 ft 0 in (2.13 m)	230 lb (104 kg)	1953–08–30	Centenary
G/F	8	Scott Wedman	6 ft 7 in (2.01 m)	215 lb (98 kg)	1952–07–29	Colorado

Coaches
Head coach
- K.C. Jones
Assistant(s)
- Jimmy Rodgers
- Chris Ford

Legend
- (DP) Unsigned draft pick
- (FA) Free agent
- (S) Suspended
- Injured

=== Los Angeles Lakers ===
1983–84 Los Angeles Lakers roster
Players

Pos.	No.	Player	Height	Weight	DOB	From
C	33	Kareem Abdul-Jabbar	7 ft 2 in (2.18 m)	225 lb (102 kg)	1947–04–16	UCLA
G	21	Michael Cooper	6 ft 5 in (1.96 m)	170 lb (77 kg)	1956–04–15	New Mexico
F	0	Calvin Garrett	6 ft 7 in (2.01 m)	190 lb (86 kg)	1956–07–11	Oral Roberts
G	32	Magic Johnson	6 ft 8 in (2.03 m)	215 lb (98 kg)	1959–08–14	Michigan State
G	15	Eddie Jordan	6 ft 1 in (1.85 m)	170 lb (77 kg)	1955–01–29	Rutgers
F	25	Mitch Kupchak	6 ft 9 in (2.06 m)	230 lb (104 kg)	1954–05–24	North Carolina
C	11	Bob McAdoo	6 ft 9 in (2.06 m)	210 lb (95 kg)	1951–09–25	North Carolina
F	40	Mike McGee	6 ft 5 in (1.96 m)	190 lb (86 kg)	1959–07–29	Michigan
C	41	Swen Nater	6 ft 11 in (2.11 m)	240 lb (109 kg)	1950–01–14	UCLA
F	31	Kurt Rambis	6 ft 8 in (2.03 m)	213 lb (97 kg)	1958–02–25	Santa Clara
G	4	Byron Scott	6 ft 3 in (1.91 m)	195 lb (88 kg)	1961–03–28	Arizona State
F	35	Larry Spriggs	6 ft 7 in (2.01 m)	230 lb (104 kg)	1959–09–08	Howard
F	52	Jamaal Wilkes	6 ft 6 in (1.98 m)	190 lb (86 kg)	1953–05–02	UCLA
F	42	James Worthy	6 ft 9 in (2.06 m)	225 lb (102 kg)	1961–02–27	North Carolina

Coaches
Head coach
- Pat Riley
Assistant(s)
- Bill Bertka
- Dave Wohl

Legend
- (DP) Unsigned draft pick
- (FA) Free agent
- (S) Suspended
- Injured

== Television coverage ==
The 1984 championship series scored high TV ratings. All the playoff action was documented on the 1984 NBA Season documentary Pride and Passion, narrated by Dick Stockton. Stockton, the play-by-play announcer for the series, was joined by Tom Heinsohn, and the duo would call the next four NBA Finals until 1987.

== Legacy and Aftermath ==
President Ronald Reagan presented with a Celtics jacket at the team's White House visit

Reflecting back on the series, Magic Johnson said ". . . (the Lakers) learned a valuable lesson. Only the strong survive. . . talent just don't get it. That's the first time the (80's) Lakers ever encountered that, someone stronger minded." Johnson dribbling out the clock of a tied game in Game 4 and Worthy's turnover to Henderson in Game 2 were considered two of the biggest blunders in NBA history. Johnson himself would receive tremendous criticism for his performance in the Finals by fans and media, after being thoroughly outplayed by rival Larry Bird. Following the Finals, he was jokingly named "Tragic Johnson" for his performance in the series.

Both teams met again in the Finals the next year, although a bar fight involving Larry Bird outside a Boston bar (Chelsea's) during the 1985 Eastern Conference Finals impacted the Celtics in the series. Bird suffered a temporary finger injury which affected his play; he struggled in the last two games of the Eastern Conference Finals against the Sixers and throughout the 1985 Finals. In the series, the Lakers returned the favor and defeated the Celtics in six games, clinching the title at Boston Garden after years of torment and bad misfortune at the arena. The Celtics would then win their next championship two years later over the Hakeem Olajuwon-led Houston Rockets in six games. The Celtics and Lakers met for the third time in the 1980s in 1987, which the Lakers also won in six games. Johnson, who by then had shaken and outgrown the "Tragic Johnson" nickname, would win his third NBA Finals MVP in the series, highlighted by a "junior sky hook" game-winner in Game 4.

=== In popular culture ===
The 1984 NBA Finals (as well as the 1985 and 1987 Finals between the Celtics and Lakers) has been covered in-depth in many documentaries, including ESPN’s 30 for 30 Celtics/Lakers: Best of Enemies, Hulu's Legacy: The True Story of the LA Lakers, and HBO’s Celtics City and Magic & Bird: A Courtship of Rivals.

The 1984 Finals was dramatized in the Season 2 of HBO's Winning Time: The Rise of the Lakers Dynasty, which was based on the book Showtime: Magic, Kareem, Riley, and the Los Angeles Lakers Dynasty of the 1980s by Jeff Pearlman.

== See also ==
- 1984 NBA playoffs
