= Jimmy Rodgers (basketball) =

American basketball player and coach

Personal information
- Born: March 12, 1943 (age 83) Oak Park, Illinois, U.S.

Career information
- College: Iowa (1961–1964)
- Coaching career: 1967–1998

Career history

Coaching
- 1965–1967: North Dakota (assistant)
- 1967–1970: North Dakota
- 1971–1979: Cleveland Cavaliers (assistant)
- 1979–1988: Boston Celtics (assistant)
- 1988–1990: Boston Celtics
- 1991–1993: Minnesota Timberwolves
- 1994–1998: Chicago Bulls (assistant)

Career highlights
- As assistant coach: 6× NBA champion (1981, 1984, 1986, 1996, 1997, 1998); 2× NCAA Final Four (1965, 1966)

James Donald Rodgers (born March 12, 1943) is an American former basketball coach and team executive.

== Life and career ==
Rodgers was born and raised in Franklin Park, Illinois, a Chicago suburb. An all-state player as a high school player in Illinois, Rodgers went on to play for Iowa, where he was a three-year starter on the Hawkeyes basketball team. Originally planning to go into dentistry, Rodgers, who was a pre-dental major, decided to go into coaching. After graduation, he was hired as an assistant by Bill Fitch, then the head coach for the University of North Dakota basketball team, whose team featured All-America center Phil Jackson.

Rodgers followed Fitch to the National Basketball Association (NBA) when Fitch was hired as the head coach of the expansion Cleveland Cavaliers in 1970; he would remain with the team for the duration of Fitch's tenure before following him to the Boston Celtics when Fitch became their head coach for the 1979–80 season. Rodgers remained with the team as an assistant under K. C. Jones, who replaced Fitch following the 1982–83 season, also becoming the team's director of player personnel. While hoping to land the New York Knicks head coaching job in 1987, which went to Rick Pitino, Rodgers was promoted to head coach of the Celtics after Jones decided to retire from coaching after the 1987–88 season.

He coached the Celtics for two seasons, with the team going 42–40 in 1988–89 (and a playoff berth and quick first-round exit), due to a season where its star player, Larry Bird, missed all but six games due to injury. After the team rebounded to a 52–30 record the following season, Rodgers was fired after a first-round playoff loss to the Knicks in five games.

He was hired by the expansion Minnesota Timberwolves in 1991, where for nearly a season and a half, with a young team devoid of talent, the Wolves struggled to a combined record of 21–90, before he was fired in the middle of the 1992–93 season. He served as an assistant on staffs that won six NBA championships (1981, 1984, and 1986 with the Celtics, and 1996, 1997, and 1998 with the Chicago Bulls, where he reunited with Phil Jackson, who was the team's head coach). During his days as an assistant with the Celtics, he helped coach Celtic players Bird, Kevin McHale, Robert Parish and Dennis Johnson (plus Nate Archibald in 1981 and Bill Walton in 1986). As an assistant for Chicago, he helped Jackson coach championship-winning teams that featured Michael Jordan, Scottie Pippen and Dennis Rodman.

== Head coaching record ==
Legend
Regular season	G	Games coached	W	Games won	L	Games lost	W–L %	Win–loss %
Playoffs	PG	Playoff games	PW	Playoff wins	PL	Playoff losses	PW–L %	Playoff win–loss %

Team	Year	G	W	L	W–L%	Finish	PG	PW	PL	PW–L%	Result
Boston	1988–89	82	42	40	.512	3rd in Atlantic	3	0	3	.000	Lost in First round
Boston	1989–90	82	52	30	.634	2nd in Atlantic	5	2	3	.400	Lost in First round
Minnesota	1991–92	82	15	67	.183	6th in Midwest	–	–	–	–	Missed Playoffs
Minnesota	1992–93	29	6	23	.207	(fired)	–	–	–	–	–
Career		275	115	160	.418		8	2	6	.250	
