= 1983–84 NBA season =

38th NBA season

- League: National Basketball Association
- Sport: Basketball
- Duration: October 28, 1983 – April 15, 1984; April 17 – May 25, 1984 (Playoffs); May 27 – June 12, 1984 (Finals)
- Teams: 23
- TV partner(s): CBS, ESPN, USA

Draft
- Top draft pick: Ralph Sampson
- Picked by: Houston Rockets

Regular season
- Top seed: Boston Celtics
- Season MVP: Larry Bird (Boston)
- Top scorer: Adrian Dantley (Utah)

Playoffs
- Eastern champions: Boston Celtics
- Eastern runners-up: Milwaukee Bucks
- Western champions: Los Angeles Lakers
- Western runners-up: Phoenix Suns

Finals
- Champions: Boston Celtics
- Runners-up: Los Angeles Lakers
- Finals MVP: Larry Bird (Boston)

NBA seasons
- ← 1982–83 1984–85 →

The 1983–84 NBA season was the 38th season of the National Basketball Association. The season ended with the Boston Celtics winning the NBA championship, beating the Los Angeles Lakers 4 games to 3 for the second time since 1969 in the NBA Finals.

== Notable occurrences ==
Coaching changes
Offseason
Team	1982–83 coach	1983–84 coach
Atlanta Hawks	Kevin Loughery	Mike Fratello
Boston Celtics	Bill Fitch	K.C. Jones
Chicago Bulls	Paul Westhead	Kevin Loughery
Detroit Pistons	Scotty Robertson	Chuck Daly
Golden State Warriors	Al Attles	Johnny Bach
Houston Rockets	Del Harris	Bill Fitch
New Jersey Nets	Bill Blair	Stan Albeck
San Antonio Spurs	Stan Albeck	Morris McHone
San Diego Clippers	Paul Silas	Jim Lynam
In-season
Team	Outgoing coach	Incoming coach
San Antonio Spurs	Morris McHone	Bob Bass

- The Detroit Pistons defeated the Denver Nuggets 186–184 in triple overtime) on December 13, 1983, to set a record for most points scored by both teams in an NBA game (370). The previous record (337) had been set on March 6, 1982, when San Antonio beat Milwaukee 171–166
- The 1984 NBA All-Star Game was played at McNichols Sports Arena in Denver, Colorado, with the East defeating the West 154–145. Isiah Thomas of the Detroit Pistons wins the game's MVP award. Larry Nance of the Phoenix Suns won the first NBA Slam Dunk championship.
- David Stern began his tenure as the league's fourth commissioner, effective April 1.
- The NBA Playoffs were expanded from 6 teams per conference to 8, where it stands to this date (with a play-in tournament for the #7 and #8 seeds in each conference added in 2020). As a result, the 'first round bye' system was eliminated.
- For the first time, the first round of the NBA Playoffs went from best-of-three to best-of-five playoff. The first round would remain best-of-five until going to best-of-seven in 2003.
- Ralph Sampson became the first rookie to win the Rookie of the Month Award in every month of the season. He unanimously won the Rookie of the Year Award. David Robinson, Chris Paul, Blake Griffin, Damian Lillard, Karl-Anthony Towns, and Victor Wembanyama would later achieve the same feat.
- Kareem Abdul-Jabbar surpassed Wilt Chamberlain to become the all-time NBA career leader in points. He passed Chamberlain in a game against the Utah Jazz at Las Vegas' Thomas & Mack Center on April 5. Fittingly, it was his trademark sky-hook that put him in the record books.
- The Dallas Mavericks made their first postseason appearance, beating the Seattle SuperSonics 3 game to 2 before bowing out to the Los Angeles Lakers 4–1 in the Conference Semifinals. Game 5 of the Seattle series was played at Moody Coliseum as Reunion Arena, the Mavericks' home, was unavailable.
- The Utah Jazz appeared in the postseason for the first time, defeating the Denver Nuggets 3 games to 2 in the opening round and then losing to the Phoenix Suns 4 to 2 games in the Western semis. This started a streak of 20 consecutive playoff appearances, fourth longest in the NBA behind the Portland Trail Blazers (21 between 1983 and 2003), the Philadelphia 76ers (23 between 1949 (as Syracuse Nationals) and 1971), and the San Antonio Spurs 22 between 1998 and 2019).
- The Clippers play their final season in San Diego, California.
- This would be the last season until 2013–14 that the Finals had the 2–2–1–1–1 format (for home and away games for a finalist). The Finals would adopt the 2–3–2 format the following season.
- The New Jersey Nets won a playoff series for the first time in their NBA history, upsetting the defending champion Philadelphia 76ers in five games. The series marked the only time (to date) a road team won every game in a five-game playoff series.
- This was the final season of ESPN broadcasting NBA games until the 2002–03 season, which also marked the league's return to future corporate partner ABC. It also marked the final season of NBA broadcasts on the USA Network.
- Spalding replaced Wilson as manufacturer of the official NBA game ball, a relationship that continued until 2021.
- It was the final season for eventual Hall of Famers Tiny Archibald, Elvin Hayes and Bob Lanier. Another eventual Hall of Famer David Thompson unexpectedly retired due to his injury from an accident.
- All five teams in the Atlantic Division made the playoffs, the first such occurrence for any division.

== Final standings ==
=== By division ===
Atlantic Division	W	L	PCT	GB	Home	Road	Div
y-Boston Celtics	62	20	.756	–	33–8	29–12	13–11
x-Philadelphia 76ers	52	30	.634	10	32–9	20–21	15–9
x-New York Knicks	47	35	.573	15	29–12	18–23	12–12
x-New Jersey Nets	45	37	.549	17	29–12	16–25	12–12
x-Washington Bullets	35	47	.427	27	25–16	10–31	8–16

Central Division	W	L	PCT	GB	Home	Road	Div
y-Milwaukee Bucks	50	32	.610	–	30–11	20–21	19–10
x-Detroit Pistons	49	33	.598	1	30–11	19–22	21–8
x-Atlanta Hawks	40	42	.488	10	31–10	9–32	16–14
Cleveland Cavaliers	28	54	.341	22	23–18	5–36	11–19
Chicago Bulls	27	55	.329	23	18–23	9–32	10–20
Indiana Pacers	26	56	.317	24	20–21	6–35	12–18

Midwest Division	W	L	PCT	GB	Home	Road	Div
y-Utah Jazz	45	37	.549	–	31–10	14–27	15–15
x-Dallas Mavericks	43	39	.524	2	31–10	12–29	19–11
x-Denver Nuggets	38	44	.463	7	27–14	11–30	16–14
x-Kansas City Kings	38	44	.463	7	26–15	12–29	16–14
San Antonio Spurs	37	45	.451	8	28–13	9–32	14–16
Houston Rockets	29	53	.354	16	21–20	8–33	9–21

Pacific Division	W	L	PCT	GB	Home	Road	Div
y-Los Angeles Lakers	54	28	.659	–	28–13	26–15	18–12
x-Portland Trail Blazers	48	34	.585	6	33–8	15–26	17–13
x-Seattle SuperSonics	42	40	.512	12	32–9	10–31	14–16
x-Phoenix Suns	41	41	.500	13	31–10	10–31	16–14
Golden State Warriors	37	45	.451	17	27–14	10–31	13–17
San Diego Clippers	30	52	.366	24	25–16	5–36	12–18

=== By conference ===
#	Eastern Conference				
#	Team	W	L	PCT	GB
1	z-Boston Celtics	62	20	.756	–
2	y-Milwaukee Bucks	50	32	.610	12
3	x-Philadelphia 76ers	52	30	.634	10
4	x-Detroit Pistons	49	33	.598	13
5	x-New York Knicks	47	35	.573	15
6	x-New Jersey Nets	45	37	.549	17
7	x-Atlanta Hawks	40	42	.488	22
8	x-Washington Bullets	35	47	.427	27
9	Cleveland Cavaliers	28	54	.341	34
10	Chicago Bulls	27	55	.329	35
11	Indiana Pacers	26	56	.317	36

#	Western Conference				
#	Team	W	L	PCT	GB
1	c-Los Angeles Lakers	54	28	.659	–
2	y-Utah Jazz	45	37	.549	9
3	x-Portland Trail Blazers	48	34	.585	6
4	x-Dallas Mavericks	43	39	.524	11
5	x-Seattle SuperSonics	42	40	.512	12
6	x-Phoenix Suns	41	41	.500	13
7	x-Denver Nuggets	38	44	.463	16
8	x-Kansas City Kings	38	44	.463	16
9	San Antonio Spurs	37	45	.451	17
10	Golden State Warriors	37	45	.451	17
11	San Diego Clippers	30	52	.366	24
12	Houston Rockets	29	53	.354	25

Notes

- z – Clinched home court advantage for the entire playoffs
- c – Clinched home court advantage for the conference playoffs
- y – Clinched division title
- x – Clinched playoff spot

== Playoffs ==
Teams in bold advanced to the next round. The numbers to the left of each team indicate the team's seeding in its conference, and the numbers to the right indicate the number of games the team won in that round. The division champions are marked by an asterisk. Home court advantage does not necessarily belong to the higher-seeded team, but instead the team with the better regular season record; teams enjoying the home advantage are shown in italics.

First Round	Conference Semifinals
**E1**	**Boston***	**3**
E8	Washington	1
**E1**	**Boston***	**4**
E5	New York	3
E4	Detroit	2
**E5**	**New York**	**3**
**Eastern Conference**
E3	Philadelphia	2
**E6**	**New Jersey**	**3**
E6	New Jersey	2
**E2**	**Milwaukee***	**4**
**E2**	**Milwaukee***	**3**
E7	Atlanta	2
**W1**	**Los Angeles***	**3**
W8	Kansas City	0
**W1**	**Los Angeles***	**4**
W4	Dallas	1
**W4**	**Dallas**	**3**
W5	Seattle	2
**Western Conference**
W3	Portland	2
**W6**	**Phoenix**	**3**
**W6**	**Phoenix**	**4**
W2	Utah*	2
**W2**	**Utah***	**3**
W7	Denver	2

Conference Finals
**E1**	**Boston***	**4**
E2	Milwaukee*	1
**W1**	**Los Angeles***	**4**
W6	Phoenix	2

NBA Finals
**E1**	**Boston***	**4**
W1	Los Angeles*	3

- * Division winner
- **Bold** Series winner
- Italic Team with home-court advantage

== Statistics leaders ==
Category	Player	Team	Stat
Points per game	Adrian Dantley	Utah Jazz	30.6
Rebounds per game	Moses Malone	Philadelphia 76ers	13.4
Assists per game	Magic Johnson	Los Angeles Lakers	13.1
Steals per game	Rickey Green	Utah Jazz	2.65
Blocks per game	Mark Eaton	Utah Jazz	4.28
FG%	Artis Gilmore	San Antonio Spurs	.631
FT%	Larry Bird	Boston Celtics	.888
3FG%	Darrell Griffith	Utah Jazz	.361

== NBA awards ==
=== Yearly awards ===
- Most Valuable Player: Larry Bird, Boston Celtics
- Rookie of the Year: Ralph Sampson, Houston Rockets
- Defensive Player of the Year: Sidney Moncrief, Milwaukee Bucks
- Sixth Man of the Year: Kevin McHale, Boston Celtics
- Coach of the Year: Frank Layden, Utah Jazz

- All-NBA First Team:
  - F – Larry Bird, Boston Celtics
  - F – Bernard King, New York Knicks
  - C – Kareem Abdul-Jabbar, Los Angeles Lakers
  - G – Isiah Thomas, Detroit Pistons
  - G – Magic Johnson, Los Angeles Lakers
- All-NBA Second Team:
  - F – Adrian Dantley, Utah Jazz
  - F – Julius Erving, Philadelphia 76ers
  - C – Moses Malone, Philadelphia 76ers
  - G – Sidney Moncrief, Milwaukee Bucks
  - G – Jim Paxson, Portland Trail Blazers

- All-NBA Rookie Team:
  - Steve Stipanovich, Indiana Pacers
  - Ralph Sampson, Houston Rockets
  - Darrell Walker, New York Knicks
  - Jeff Malone, Washington Bullets
  - Thurl Bailey, Utah Jazz
  - Byron Scott, Los Angeles Lakers

- NBA All-Defensive First Team:
  - Bobby Jones, Philadelphia 76ers
  - Michael Cooper, Los Angeles Lakers
  - Tree Rollins, Atlanta Hawks
  - Maurice Cheeks, Philadelphia 76ers
  - Sidney Moncrief, Milwaukee Bucks
- NBA All-Defensive Second Team:
  - Larry Bird, Boston Celtics
  - Dan Roundfield, Atlanta Hawks
  - Kareem Abdul-Jabbar, Los Angeles Lakers
  - Dennis Johnson, Boston Celtics
  - T. R. Dunn, Denver Nuggets

=== Player of the week ===
The following players were named NBA Player of the Week.

Week	Player
Oct. 28 – Nov. 6	Eddie Johnson (Kansas City Kings)
Nov. 7 – Nov. 13	Magic Johnson (Los Angeles Lakers)
Nov. 14 – Nov. 20	Kiki Vandeweghe (Denver Nuggets)
Nov. 21 – Nov. 27	Mark Aguirre (Dallas Mavericks)
Nov. 28 – Dec. 4	Rickey Green (Utah Jazz)
Dec. 5 – Dec. 11	Jeff Ruland (Washington Bullets)
Dec. 12 – Dec. 18	Adrian Dantley (Utah Jazz)
Dec. 19 – Dec. 26	Dan Roundfield (Atlanta Hawks)
Dec. 27 – Jan. 2	Isiah Thomas (Detroit Pistons)
Jan. 3 – Jan. 8	Purvis Short (Golden State Warriors)
Jan. 9 – Jan. 15	Kelly Tripucka (Detroit Pistons)
Jan. 16 – Jan. 22	Buck Williams (New Jersey Nets)
Jan. 31 – Feb. 5	Bernard King (New York Knicks)
Feb. 6 – Feb. 12	Kareem Abdul-Jabbar (Los Angeles Lakers)
Feb. 13 – Feb. 19	Larry Bird (Boston Celtics)
Feb. 20 – Feb. 26	Magic Johnson (Los Angeles Lakers)
Feb. 27 – Mar. 4	Mickey Johnson (Golden State Warriors)
Mar. 5 – Mar. 11	Larry Bird (Boston Celtics)
Mar. 12 – Mar. 18	Adrian Dantley (Utah Jazz)
Mar. 19 – Mar. 25	Moses Malone (Philadelphia 76ers)
Mar. 26 – Apr. 1	Isiah Thomas (Detroit Pistons)
Apr. 2 – Apr. 8	Kareem Abdul-Jabbar (Los Angeles Lakers)
Apr. 9 – Apr. 15	Dominique Wilkins (Atlanta Hawks)

=== Player of the month ===
The following players were named NBA Player of the Month.

Month	Player
November	Magic Johnson (Los Angeles Lakers)
December	Jeff Ruland (Washington Bullets)
January	Mark Aguirre (Dallas Mavericks)
February	Bernard King (New York Knicks)
March	Kareem Abdul-Jabbar (Los Angeles Lakers)

=== Rookie of the month ===
The following players were named NBA Rookie of the Month.

Month	Rookie
November	Ralph Sampson (Houston Rockets)
December	Ralph Sampson (Houston Rockets)
January	Ralph Sampson (Houston Rockets)
February	Ralph Sampson (Houston Rockets)
March	Ralph Sampson (Houston Rockets)

=== Coach of the month ===
The following coaches were named NBA Coach of the Month.

Month	Coach
November	Dick Motta (Dallas Mavericks)
December	Frank Layden (Utah Jazz)
January	K.C. Jones (Boston Celtics)
February	Chuck Daly (Detroit Pistons)
March	Jack Ramsay (Portland Trail Blazers)

== See also ==
- List of NBA regular season records
