= 1983–84 Utah Jazz season =

NBA professional basketball team season

- Division champions
- Head coach: Frank Layden
- General manager: Frank Layden
- Owner: Sam Battistone
- Arena: Salt Palace; Thomas & Mack Center (11 home games)

Results
- Record: 45–37 (.549)
- Place: Division: 1st (Midwest); Conference: 2nd (Western)
- Playoff finish: Conference semifinals (lost to Suns 2–4)
- Stats at Basketball Reference

Local media
- Television: KSL-TV
- Radio: KSL

The 1983–84 NBA season was the Jazz's tenth season in the NBA and its 4th in Utah. The Jazz averaged 115.0 points per game (ranked 5th in NBA) while allowing an average of 113.8 points per game (ranked 20th in NBA). It was their first playoff appearance in franchise history.

The Jazz played a number of home games (11 in total) at the then-newly built Thomas & Mack Center in the Las Vegas Valley, in an attempt to drum up regional support. In one of those games, Los Angeles Lakers center Kareem Abdul-Jabbar scored the points that made him the NBA's all-time leading scorer.

As a result of the Las Vegas experiment, Jazz games were broadcast in the Las Vegas area for this season (seen above).

== Draft picks ==
Round	Pick	Player	Position	Nationality	School/Club team
1	7	Thurl Bailey	United States	PF/C	North Carolina State
3	54	Bob Hansen	United States		Iowa
4	76	Doug Arnold	United States		Texas Christian
5	100	Matt Clark	United States		Oklahoma State

== Roster ==
Utah Jazz roster
Players

Pos.	No.	Player	Height	Weight	DOB	From
SF	11	J. J. Anderson	6 ft 8 in (2.03 m)	195 lb (88 kg)	1960–09–23	Bradley
PF	41	Thurl Bailey	6 ft 11 in (2.11 m)	215 lb (98 kg)	1961–04–07	NC State
PF	33	Tom Boswell	6 ft 9 in (2.06 m)	220 lb (100 kg)	1953–10–02	South Carolina
SF	4	Adrian Dantley	6 ft 5 in (1.96 m)	208 lb (94 kg)	1955–02–28	Notre Dame
SF	22	John Drew	6 ft 6 in (1.98 m)	205 lb (93 kg)	1954–09–30	Gardner–Webb
C	53	Mark Eaton	7 ft 4 in (2.24 m)	275 lb (125 kg)	1957–01–24	UCLA
PG	31	Jerry Eaves	6 ft 4 in (1.93 m)	180 lb (82 kg)	1959–02–08	Louisville
PG	14	Rickey Green	6 ft 0 in (1.83 m)	170 lb (77 kg)	1954–08–18	Michigan
SG	35	Darrell Griffith	6 ft 4 in (1.93 m)	190 lb (86 kg)	1958–06–16	Louisville
SG	20	Bob Hansen	6 ft 6 in (1.98 m)	190 lb (86 kg)	1961–01–18	Iowa
C	44	Rich Kelley	7 ft 0 in (2.13 m)	235 lb (107 kg)	1953–03–23	Stanford
C	45	Jeff Wilkins	6 ft 11 in (2.11 m)	230 lb (104 kg)	1955–03–09	Illinois State

Coaches
Head coach
- Frank Layden
Assistant(s)
- Phil Johnson
- Scott Layden

Legend
- (DP) Unsigned draft pick
- (FA) Free agent
- (S) Suspended
- Injured

Roster
Updated: November 4, 1983

== Regular season ==
- April 5, 1984: Kareem Abdul-Jabbar made a 12-foot hook shot over Mark Eaton in Las Vegas to surpass Wilt Chamberlain as the NBA's all-time leading scorer with 31,421 points.

=== Season standings ===
Midwest Division	W	L	PCT	GB	Home	Road	Div
y-Utah Jazz	45	37	.549	–	31–10	14–27	15–15
x-Dallas Mavericks	43	39	.524	2	31–10	12–29	19–11
x-Denver Nuggets	38	44	.463	7	27–14	11–30	16–14
x-Kansas City Kings	38	44	.463	7	26–15	12–29	16–14
San Antonio Spurs	37	45	.451	8	28–13	9–32	14–16
Houston Rockets	29	53	.354	16	21–20	8–33	9–21

#	Western Conference				
#	Team	W	L	PCT	GB
1	c-Los Angeles Lakers	54	28	.659	–
2	y-Utah Jazz	45	37	.549	9
3	x-Portland Trail Blazers	48	34	.585	6
4	x-Dallas Mavericks	43	39	.524	11
5	x-Seattle SuperSonics	42	40	.512	12
6	x-Phoenix Suns	41	41	.500	13
7	x-Denver Nuggets	38	44	.463	16
8	x-Kansas City Kings	38	44	.463	16
9	San Antonio Spurs	37	45	.451	17
10	Golden State Warriors	37	45	.451	17
11	San Diego Clippers	30	52	.366	24
12	Houston Rockets	29	53	.354	25

== Game log ==
=== Regular season ===
1983–84 game log
Total: 45–37 (home: 31–10; road: 14–27)
October: 0–2 (home: 0–1; road: 0–1)

Game	Date	Team	Score	High points	High rebounds	High assists	Location Attendance	Record
1	October 28	@ Denver	L 125–139	Dantley (40)	Dantley (9)	Green (11)	McNichols Sports Arena; 10,439	0–1
2	October 29	Los Angeles	L 115–120	Dantley (24)	Dantley (10)	Dantley, Griffith (5)	Salt Palace Acord Arena; 10,608	0–2

November: 9–7 (home: 6–1; road: 3–6)

Game	Date	Team	Score	High points	High rebounds	High assists	Location Attendance	Record
3	November 3	Golden State	W 129–112				Salt Palace Acord Arena	1–2
4	November 5	San Antonio	W 124–118				Salt Palace Acord Arena	2–2
5	November 9	@ San Antonio	L 99–105				HemisFair Arena	2–3
6	November 10	@ Houston	W 118–109				The Summit	3–3
7	November 12	Portland	W 136–122	Dantley (34)	Bailey, Griffith, Kelley (6)	Green (13)	Salt Palace Acord Arena; 7,572	4–3
8	November 13	@ Los Angeles	L 118–124	Dantley (36)	Dantley (12)	Dantley (7)	The Forum; 12,039	4–4
9	November 15	@ Portland	L 112–114	Drew (31)	Kelley (8)	Eaves, Green (5)	Memorial Coliseum; 12,656	4–5
10	November 16	Boston	W 122–109	Drew (29)	Eaton (12)	Green (6)	Salt Palace Acord Arena; 12,743	5–5
11	November 18	@ Detroit	L 120–128	Dantley (34)	Drew (9)	Green (14)	Pontiac Silverdome; 7,080	5–6
12	November 19	@ Washington	L 113–126	Dantley, Griffith (18)	Eaton (7)	Eaton (5)	Capital Centre; 7,603	5–7
13	November 22	@ Los Angeles	W 130–126 (OT)	Dantley (32)	Dantley (10)	Green (15)	The Forum; 12,553	6–7
14	November 23	Chicago (at Las Vegas, NV)	L 117–128				Thomas & Mack Center	6–8
15	November 25	Denver	W 126–124	Dantley (47)	Bailey (10)	Green (15)	Salt Palace Acord Arena; 8,759	7–8
16	November 26	@ Kansas City	L 116–117	Dantley (30)	Eaton (9)	Green (8)	Kemper Arena; 7,424	7–9
17	November 29	Phoenix (at Las Vegas, NV)	W 114–110	Dantley, Griffith (24)	Bailey, Drew (8)	Green (13)	Thomas & Mack Center; 7,143	8–9
18	November 30	@ San Diego	W 117–115				San Diego Sports Arena	9–9

December: 11–2 (home: 6–1; road: 5–1)

Game	Date	Team	Score	High points	High rebounds	High assists	Location Attendance	Record
19	December 2	@ Phoenix	W 116–113	Dantley (32)	Bailey (7)	Bailey, Green (9)	Arizona Veterans Memorial Coliseum; 10,295	10–9
20	December 3	Kansas City	W 112–107	Dantley (31)	Kelley (12)	Green (9)	Salt Palace Acord Arena; 8,314	11–9
21	December 7	Portland	W 116–111	Dantley (32)	Wilkins (11)	Green (9)	Salt Palace Acord Arena; 7,562	12–9
22	December 9	San Antonio (at Las Vegas, NV)	L 117–126				Thomas & Mack Center	12–10
23	December 10	@ Houston	W 128–121				The Summit	13–10
24	December 13	@ Cleveland	W 107–105				Richfield Coliseum	14–10
25	December 15	Houston	W 138–111				Salt Palace Acord Arena	15–10
26	December 17	Golden State	W 127–111				Salt Palace Acord Arena	16–10
27	December 21	Indiana	W 133–115				Salt Palace Acord Arena	17–10
28	December 23	Denver	W 118–116	Dantley (27)	Wilkins (13)	Green (9)	Salt Palace Acord Arena; 7,599	18–10
29	December 27	@ Golden State	W 111–102				Oakland–Alameda County Coliseum Arena	19–10
30	December 28	@ Seattle	W 113–105	Dantley (33)	Wilkins (9)	Green (7)	Kingdome; 12,831	20–10
31	December 30	@ Denver	L 130–135	Dantley (32)	Dantley, Eaton (5)	Green (9)	McNichols Sports Arena; 11,882	20–11

January: 8–5 (home: 6–1; road: 2–4)

Game	Date	Team	Score	High points	High rebounds	High assists	Location Attendance	Record
32	January 3	@ San Antonio	L 124–137				HemisFair Arena	21–11
33	January 4	Houston (at Las Vegas, NV)	W 116–111				Thomas & Mack Center	22–11
34	January 6	Kansas City	W 130–110	Dantley (30)	Bailey (14)	Green (14)	Salt Palace Acord Arena; 10,898	22–12
35	January 10	Phoenix	W 107–98	Griffith (22)	Bailey (9)	Dantley, Green (8)	Salt Palace Acord Arena; 10,720	23–12
36	January 11	@ Dallas	L 102–117	Dantley (22)	Eaton (13)	Green (9)	Reunion Arena; 12,308	23–13
37	January 13	@ San Diego	W 122–119				San Diego Sports Arena	24–13
38	January 14	Washington	W 121–96	Dantley (44)	Kelley (12)	Green (14)	Salt Palace Acord Arena; 11,910	25–13
39	January 17	@ Atlanta	L 106–112	Griffith (30)	Wilkins (7)	Green (10)	The Omni; 6,419	25–14
40	January 20	@ Dallas	W 120–113	Dantley (46)	Bailey (12)	Green (17)	Reunion Arena; 16,918	26–14
41	January 21	@ Houston	L 105–115				The Summit	26–15
42	January 24	Dallas at (Las Vegas, NV)	L 115–123	Griffith (28)	Kelley (11)	Green (10)	Thomas & Mack Center; 7,752	26–16
43	January 26	New Jersey	W 125–115	Dantley (39)	Kelley (16)	Green (12)	Salt Palace Acord Arena; 10,166	27–16
All-Star Break
44	January 31	Seattle (at Las Vegas, NV)	W 98–94 (OT)	Dantley (34)	Kelley (11)	Green (7)	Thomas & Mack Center; 7,148	28–16

February: 6–10 (home: 4–4; road: 2–6)

Game	Date	Team	Score	High points	High rebounds	High assists	Location Attendance	Record
45	February 2	Phoenix	W 116–95	Dantley (35)	Kelley (14)	Green (11)	Salt Palace Acord Arena; 8,892	29–16
46	February 3	@ Los Angeles	L 105–109	Dantley (34)	Green (8)	Green (6)	The Forum; 17,505	29–17
47	February 4	Milwaukee	W 116–102	Dantley (36)	Eaton (10)	Green (13)	Salt Palace Acord Arena; 12,690	30–17
48	February 7	San Diego (at Las Vegas, NV)	L 103–109				Thomas & Mack Center	30–18
49	February 10	New York	L 111–121	Dantley (39)	Dantley, Kelley (9)	Green (12)	Salt Palace Acord Arena; 11,543	30–19
50	February 12	@ Portland	W 114–112	Drew (23)	Eaton (12)	Green (6)	Memorial Coliseum; 12,656	31–19
51	February 14	Atlanta	W 100–98	Dantley (28)	Wilkins (8)	Green (20)	Salt Palace Acord Arena; 9,641	32–19
52	February 16	@ Kansas City	L 99–121	Dantley (26)	Griffith, Wilkins (12)	Green (5)	Kemper Arena; 5,443	32–20
53	February 17	@ Milwaukee	L 91–105	Dantley (26)	Eaton (16)	Green (13)	MECCA Arena; 11,052	32–21
54	February 19	@ Indiana	L 104–106				Market Square Arena	32–22
55	February 21	@ Chicago	W 117–95				Chicago Stadium	33–22
56	February 23	San Antonio	W 143–142 (2OT)				Salt Palace ACord Arena	34–22
57	February 24	@ Seattle	L 81–112	Dantley, Drew (16)	Eaton (13)	Griffith, Hansen (5)	Kingdome; 12,167	34–23
58	February 25	Dallas	L 95–97	Dantley (36)	Kelley (16)	Kelley (9)	Salt Palace Acord Arena; 12,678	34–24
59	February 28	@ Phoenix	L 100–113	Dantley (25)	Wilkins (6)	Griffith (7)	Arizona Veterans Memorial Coliseum; 10,899	34–25
60	February 29	Philadelphia	L 97–103	Dantley (32)	Eaton (13)	Eaton (7)	Salt Palace Acord Arena; 13,475	34–26

March: 8–8 (home: 6–1; road: 2–7)

Game	Date	Team	Score	High points	High rebounds	High assists	Location Attendance	Record
61	March 2	Cleveland	W 110–104				Salt Palace Acord Arena	35–26
62	March 3	@ Denver	L 122–131	Dantley (36)	Griffith (10)	Green (10)	McNichols Sports Arena; 10,880	35–27
63	March 5	@ New Jersey	L 116–120	Dantley (28)	Eaton (13)	Green (6)	Brendan Byrne Arena; 10,060	35–28
64	March 7	@ Boston	L 106–117	Drew (27)	Eaton (13)	Green (5)	Boston Garden; 14,890	35–29
65	March 10	@ New York	L 105–114	Dantley (32)	Eaton (8)	Green (10)	Madison Square Garden; 13,208	35–30
66	March 11	@ Philadelphia	L 97–120	Andersonn (15)	Bailey (13)	Eaves, Kelley (6)	The Spectrum; 15,101	35–31
67	March 13	Portland (at Las Vegas, NV)	W 124–119	Dantley (39)	Dantley (7)	Green (10)	Thomas & Mack Center; 7,773	36–31
68	March 15	@ Golden State	W 115–111				Oakland–Alameda County Coliseum Arena	37–31
69	March 17	Dallas	W 118–103	Dantley (40)	Kelley (11)	Green (9)	Salt Palace Acord Arena; 12,699	38–31
70	March 19	Detroit	W 143–125	Dantley (43)	Bailey, Kelley (8)	Green, Griffith (10)	Salt Palace Acord Arena; 12,698	39–31
71	March 22	@ San Antonio	L 126–129				HemisFair Arena	39–32
72	March 23	Golden State (at Las Vegas, NV)	L 104–115				Thomas & Mack Center	39–33
73	March 25	@ Seattle	W 121–98	Dantley (40)	Bailey, Dantley (8)	Dantley (10)	Kingdome; 11,574	40–33
74	March 27	Kansas City	W 110–106	Dantley (31)	Bailey, Eaton (10)	Green (10)	Salt Palace Acord Arena; 9,110	41–33
75	March 29	Seattle	W 106–96	Dantley (24)	Eaton (15)	Green (7)	Salt Palace Acord Arena; 12,687	42–33
76	March 31	@ Kansas City	L 103–105	Dantley (30)	Bailey, Eaton (8)	Dantley (9)	Kemper Arena; 13,546	42–34

April: 3–3 (home: 3–1; road: 0–2)

Game	Date	Team	Score	High points	High rebounds	High assists	Location Attendance	Record
77	April 2	Houston	W 111–100				Salt Palace Acord Arena	43–34
78	April 5	Los Angeles (at Las Vegas, NV)	L 115–129	Drew (24)	Kelley, Wilkins (6)	Green (10)	Thomas & Mack Center; 18,389	43–35
79	April 7	@ Dallas	L 100–109	Griffith (37)	Eaton (13)	Green (9)	Reunion Arena; 17,007	43–36
80	April 10	Denver (at Las Vegas, NV)	W 135–120	Green (45)	Griffith (12)	Green (10)	Thomas & Mack Center; 7,357	44–36
81	April 12	San Diego	W 113–94				Salt Palace Acord Arena	45–36
82	April 14	@ San Diego	L 128–146				San Diego Sports Arena	45–37

1983–84 schedule

== Playoffs ==
1984 playoff game log
Western Conference First Round: 3–2 (home: 2–1; road: 1–1)

Game	Date	Team	Score	High points	High rebounds	High assists	Location Attendance	Series
1	April 17	Denver	W 123–121	Dantley (30)	Dantley (9)	Green (12)	Salt Palace Acord Arena; 10,255	1–0
2	April 19	Denver	L 116–132	Dantley (27)	Dantley, Wilkins (6)	Green (6)	Salt Palace Acord Arena; 12,413	1–1
3	April 22	@ Denver	L 117–121	Dantley (29)	Bailey (11)	Green (12)	McNichols Sports Arena; 14,681	1–2
4	April 24	@ Denver	W 129–124	Dantley (39)	Dantley (8)	Dantley (7)	McNichols Sports Arena; 16,108	2–2
5	April 26	Denver	W 127–111	Dantley (30)	Dantley (12)	Green (16)	Salt Palace Acord Arena; 12,731	3–2

Western Conference Semifinals: 2–4 (home: 2–1; road: 0–3)

Game	Date	Team	Score	High points	High rebounds	High assists	Location Attendance	Series
1	April 29	Phoenix	W 105–95	Dantley (36)	Bailey (13)	Green (16)	Salt Palace Acord Arena; 12,403	1–0
2	May 2	Phoenix	L 97–102	Dantley (26)	Eaton (9)	Green (6)	Salt Palace Acord Arena; 12,689	1–1
3	May 4	@ Phoenix	L 94–106	Dantley (31)	Eaton (11)	Green (4)	Arizona Veterans Memorial Coliseum; 14,660	1–2
4	May 6	@ Phoenix	L 110–111 (OT)	Dantley (37)	Eaton (12)	Griffith (8)	Arizona Veterans Memorial Coliseum; 14,660	1–3
5	May 8	Phoenix	W 118–106	Dantley (46)	Eaton (11)	Green (14)	Salt Palace Acord Arena; 12,560	2–3
6	May 10	@ Phoenix	L 82–102	Dantley (23)	Eaton (10)	Green (6)	Arizona Veterans Memorial Coliseum; 14,660	2–4

1984 schedule

== Awards and honors ==
- Frank Layden, NBA Coach of the Year Award
- Adrian Dantley, All-NBA Second Team
- Thurl Bailey, NBA All-Rookie Team 1st Team
- Adrian Dantley, NBA leader, Points per game
