= 1983–84 Los Angeles Lakers season =

NBA professional basketball team season

- Conference champions
- Division champions
- Head coach: Pat Riley
- Owners: Jerry Buss
- Arena: The Forum

Results
- Record: 54–28 (.659)
- Place: Division: 1st (Pacific); Conference: 1st (Western)
- Playoff finish: NBA Finals (lost to Celtics 3–4)
- Stats at Basketball Reference

Local media
- Television: KHJ
- Radio: AM 570 KLAC

The 1983–84 season for the Los Angeles Lakers saw them lose in the 1984 NBA Finals against Larry Bird's Boston Celtics in seven games. The Lakers were coming off of an NBA Finals loss the previous season to the Julius Erving and Moses Malone-led Philadelphia 76ers, in which they were swept in four games. The Lakers, powered by Kareem Abdul-Jabbar (who broke the NBA's all-time total points record) and Magic Johnson with his 13.1 assists per game (tops in '84), ended up winning 54 games in the 1983–84 NBA season. On April 5, 1984, Kareem Abdul-Jabbar had a 12-foot shot over Mark Eaton of the Utah Jazz to surpass Wilt Chamberlain as the NBA's all-time leading scorer with 31,421 points.

In the playoffs, the Lakers defeated the Kansas City Kings in the first round, the Dallas Mavericks in the second, and the Phoenix Suns in the 1984 Western Conference finals in order to advance to the 1984 NBA Finals, against Larry Bird's 62–20 Boston Celtics. The Lakers' 137–104 victory in Game 3 of the Finals caused Bird to label teammates "sissies". The words inspired the Celtics, and shot down the Lakers, with the Celtics winning Game 7 by a score of 111–102.

== Draft picks ==
Round	Pick	Player	Position	Nationality	College
3	69	Orlando Phillips	F	United States	Pepperdine
4	92	Terry Lewis	G	United States	Mississippi State
5	115	Danny Dixon	G	United States	Alabama A&M
6	138	Mark Steele	F	United States	Colorado State
7	161	Ricky Mixon	G	United States	Cal State Fullerton

== Roster ==
1983–84 Los Angeles Lakers roster
Players

Pos.	No.	Player	Height	Weight	DOB	From
C	33	Kareem Abdul-Jabbar	7 ft 2 in (2.18 m)	225 lb (102 kg)	1947-04-16	UCLA
SG	21	Michael Cooper	6 ft 5 in (1.96 m)	170 lb (77 kg)	1956-04-15	New Mexico
SF	00	Calvin Garrett	6 ft 7 in (2.01 m)	190 lb (86 kg)	1956-07-11	Oral Roberts
PG	32	Magic Johnson	6 ft 9 in (2.06 m)	215 lb (98 kg)	1959-08-14	Michigan State
PF	25	Mitch Kupchak	6 ft 9 in (2.06 m)	230 lb (104 kg)	1954-05-24	North Carolina
C	11	Bob McAdoo	6 ft 9 in (2.06 m)	210 lb (95 kg)	1951-09-25	North Carolina
SF	40	Mike McGee	6 ft 5 in (1.96 m)	190 lb (86 kg)	1959-07-29	Michigan
C	41	Swen Nater	6 ft 11 in (2.11 m)	240 lb (109 kg)	1950-01-14	UCLA
PF	31	Kurt Rambis	6 ft 8 in (2.03 m)	213 lb (97 kg)	1958-02-25	Santa Clara
SG	4	Byron Scott	6 ft 3 in (1.91 m)	195 lb (88 kg)	1961-03-28	Arizona State
SF	35	Larry Spriggs	6 ft 7 in (2.01 m)	230 lb (104 kg)	1959-09-08	Howard
SF	52	Jamaal Wilkes	6 ft 6 in (1.98 m)	190 lb (86 kg)	1953-05-02	UCLA
PF	42	James Worthy	6 ft 9 in (2.06 m)	225 lb (102 kg)	1961-02-27	North Carolina

Coaches
Head coach
- Pat Riley
Assistant(s)
- Bill Bertka
- Dave Wohl

Legend
- (DP) Unsigned draft pick
- (FA) Free agent
- (S) Suspended
- Injured

Roster
Updated: April 11, 1984

== Regular season ==
=== Season standings ===
Pacific Division	W	L	PCT	GB	Home	Road	Div
y-Los Angeles Lakers	54	28	.659	–	28–13	26–15	18–12
x-Portland Trail Blazers	48	34	.585	6	33–8	15–26	17–13
x-Seattle SuperSonics	42	40	.512	12	32–9	10–31	14–16
x-Phoenix Suns	41	41	.500	13	31–10	10–31	16–14
Golden State Warriors	37	45	.451	17	27–14	10–31	13–17
San Diego Clippers	30	52	.366	24	25–16	5–36	12–18

#	Western Conference				
#	Team	W	L	PCT	GB
1	c-Los Angeles Lakers	54	28	.659	–
2	y-Utah Jazz	45	37	.549	9
3	x-Portland Trail Blazers	48	34	.585	6
4	x-Dallas Mavericks	43	39	.524	11
5	x-Seattle SuperSonics	42	40	.512	12
6	x-Phoenix Suns	41	41	.500	13
7	x-Denver Nuggets	38	44	.463	16
8	x-Kansas City Kings	38	44	.463	16
9	San Antonio Spurs	37	45	.451	17
10	Golden State Warriors	37	45	.451	17
11	San Diego Clippers	30	52	.366	24
12	Houston Rockets	29	53	.354	25

z – clinched division title
y – clinched division title
x – clinched playoff spot

== Game log ==
=== Regular season ===
1983–84 game log
Total: 54–28 (home: 28–13; road: 26–15)
October: 2–0 (home: 0–0; road: 2–0)

Game	Date	Team	Score	High points	High rebounds	High assists	Location Attendance	Record
1	October 28	@ Kansas City	W 117–107	Abdul-Jabbar & Wilkes (25)	Kareem Abdul-Jabbar (10)	Magic Johnson (11)	Kemper Arena; 15,782	1–0
2	October 29	@ Utah	W 120–115	Abdul-Jabbar & Wilkes (21)	Kareem Abdul-Jabbar (14)	Magic Johnson (14)	Salt Palace Acord Arena; 10,608	2–0

November : 10–4 (home: 7–1; road: 3–3)

Game	Date	Team	Score	High points	High rebounds	High assists	Location Attendance	Record
3	November 2	@ San Diego	L 106–110	Jamaal Wilkes (19)	Magic Johnson (11)	Magic Johnson (13)	San Diego Sports Arena; 11,629	2–1
4	November 5	@ Dallas	L 102–107	Kareem Abdul-Jabbar (16)	Mike McGee (8)	Magic Johnson (14)	Reunion Arena; 17,007	2–2
5	November 8	@ Denver	W 133–124	Magic Johnson (29)	Magic Johnson (12)	Magic Johnson (14)	McNichols Sports Arena; 10,104	3–2
6	November 9	Dallas	W 120–106	Kareem Abdul-Jabbar (24)	Kareem Abdul-Jabbar (13)	Magic Johnson (13)	The Forum; 14,341	4–2
7	November 11	Phoenix	W 119–105	Mike McGee (26)	Magic Johnson (8)	Magic Johnson (15)	The Forum; 15,316	5–2
8	November 13	Utah	W 124–118	Magic Johnson (30)	Magic Johnson (13)	Magic Johnson (16)	The Forum; 12,039	6–2
9	November 15	Milwaukee	W 126–97	Jamaal Wilkes (17)	Kareem Abdul-Jabbar (10)	Magic Johnson (17)	The Forum; 14,557	7–2
10	November 17	Cleveland	W 127–114	Jamaal Wilkes (24)	Magic Johnson (9)	Magic Johnson (22)	The Forum; 11,467	8–2
11	November 19	@ Portland	W 117–110	Abdul-Jabbar & Wilkes (20)	Johnson & Worthy (9)	Magic Johnson (13)	Memorial Coliseum; 12,666	9–2
12	November 22	Utah	L 126–130 (OT)	Bob McAdoo (31)	Johnson & McAdoo (9)	Magic Johnson (17)	The Forum; 12,553	9–3
13	November 23	@ Seattle	L 98–106	Kareem Abdul-Jabbar (19)	Abdul-Jabbar & Worthy (7)	Magic Johnson (15)	Kingdome; 13,033	9–4
14	November 25	New Jersey	W 147–123	Kareem Abdul-Jabbar (27)	Kareem Abdul-Jabbar (12)	Magic Johnson (20)	The Forum; 14,364	10–4
15	November 27	Chicago	W 103–100	Magic Johnson (29)	Magic Johnson (8)	Magic Johnson (12)	The Forum; 12,692	11–4
16	November 29	@ Golden State	W 111–-105	Mike McGee (22)	3 players tied (7)	Magic Johnson (16)	Oakland–Alameda County Coliseum Arena; 11,761	12–4

December : 7–6 (home: 6–3; road: 1–3)

Game	Date	Team	Score	High points	High rebounds	High assists	Location Attendance	Record
17	December 2	Dallas	L 118–133	Jamaal Wilkes (21)	Bob McAdoo (9)	Magic Johnson (12)	The Forum; 16,044	12–5
18	December 4	San Diego	W 120–99	Abdul-Jabbar & Scott (20)	Swen Nater (9)	Michael Cooper (17)	The Forum; 17,505	13–5
19	December 8	Kansas City	W 129–106	McGee & Wilkes (22)	Bob McAdoo (10)	Michael Cooper (10)	The Forum; 11,911	14–5
20	December 11	New York	L 98–109	Bob McAdoo (27)	Abdul-Jabbar & McAdoo (5)	Jamaal Wilkes (4)	The Forum; 12,845	14–6
21	December 15	@ Phoenix	L 104–114	Kareem Abdul-Jabbar (15)	Abdul-Jabbar & McAdoo (10)	Abdul-Jabbar & Scott (4)	Arizona Veterans Memorial Coliseum; 10,624	14–7
22	December 16	San Diego	W 122–109	Bob McAdoo (26)	Abdul-Jabbar & Cooper (6)	Michael Cooper (7)	The Forum; 15,456	15–7
23	December 18	Portland	W 122–115	James Worthy (28)	Abdul-Jabbar & Worthy (7)	Michael Cooper (9)	The Forum; 13,000	16–7
24	December 20	@ Seattle	W 108–102	Wilkes & Worthy (23)	Bob McAdoo (10)	Cooper & Scott (8)	Kingdome; 12,436	17–7
25	December 22	@ Golden State	L 102–109	Jamaal Wilkes (23)	Garrett & Worthy (7)	Michael Cooper (8)	Oakland–Alameda County Coliseum Arena; 10,621	17–8
26	December 23	Golden State	W 123–116	Bob McAdoo (27)	James Worthy (14)	Michael Cooper (16)	The Forum; 13,116	18–8
27	December 25	@ Portland	L 121–141	James Worthy (30)	Kareem Abdul-Jabbar (8)	Michael Cooper (9)	Memorial Coliseum; 12,666	18–9
28	December 27	Denver	W 118–116	Jamaal Wilkes (24)	Kareem Abdul-Jabbar (15)	Michael Cooper (12)	The Forum; 15,512	19–9
29	December 30	Golden State	L 105–116	Kareem Abdul-Jabbar (25)	Jamaal Wilkes (12)	Michael Cooper (12)	The Forum; 14,177	19–10

January : 8–6 (home: 4–3; road: 4–3)

Game	Date	Team	Score	High points	High rebounds	High assists	Location Attendance	Record
30	January 3	@ New York	L 105–117	Mike McGee (33)	Kareem Abdul-Jabbar (10)	Michael Cooper (10)	Madison Square Garden; 16,886	19–11
31	January 4	@ Cleveland	W 106–99	Magic Johnson (23)	Swen Nater (10)	Magic Johnson (10)	Richfield Coliseum; 8,027	20–11
32	January 6	San Antonio	L 117–124	Kareem Abdul-Jabbar (24)	Magic Johnson (10)	Cooper & Johnson (12)	The Forum; 17,505	20–12
33	January 8	Houston	L 118–129	Kareem Abdul-Jabbar (30)	Wilkes & Worthy (9)	Magic Johnson (14)	The Forum; 17,505	20–13
34	January 10	@ Houston	W 136–132 (OT)	Bob McAdoo (32)	James Worthy (9)	Magic Johnson (14)	The Summit; 16,016	21–13
35	January 12	@ Kansas City	W 95–89	Bob McAdoo (24)	Bob McAdoo (9)	Magic Johnson (11)	Kemper Arena; 9,131	22–13
36	January 13	@ Denver	W 141–134	Jamaal Wilkes (31)	Kareem Abdul-Jabbar (13)	Magic Johnson (18)	McNichols Sports Arena; 13,967	23–13
37	January 15	Seattle	L 91–102	Jamaal Wilkes (26)	James Worthy (13)	Magic Johnson (17)	The Forum; 17,505	23–14
38	January 17	Washington	W 108–95	Kareem Abdul-Jabbar (23)	Wilkes & Worthy (11)	Magic Johnson (12)	The Forum; 12,754	24–14
39	January 19	@ Phoenix	L 123–138	James Worthy (23)	James Worthy (9)	Magic Johnson (12)	Arizona Veterans Memorial Coliseum; 12,062	24–15
40	January 21	@ San Antonio	L 108–113	Bob McAdoo (30)	Magic Johnson (12)	Magic Johnson (12)	HemisFair Arena; 13,972	24–16
41	January 24	Phoenix	W 116–110	Bob McAdoo (24)	Jamaal Wilkes (10)	Magic Johnson (11)	The Forum; 13,896	25–16
42	January 26	Houston	W 131–102	Kareem Abdul-Jabbar (26)	James Worthy (12)	Magic Johnson (11)	The Forum; 17,505	26–16
All-Star Break
43	January 31	Portland	W 129–124	Jamaal Wilkes (23)	Magic Johnson (9)	Magic Johnson (15)	The Forum; 15,987	27–16

February : 11–4 (home: 4–1; road: 7–3)

Game	Date	Team	Score	High points	High rebounds	High assists	Location Attendance	Record
44	February 1	@ Denver	W 116–108	Byron Scott (32)	Magic Johnson (10)	Magic Johnson (17)	McNichols Sports Arena; 14,009	28–16
45	February 3	Utah	W 109–105	Kareem Abdul-Jabbar (29)	Kareem Abdul-Jabbar (12)	Magic Johnson (16)	The Forum; 17,505	29–16
46	February 5	@ San Antonio	W 110–98	Kareem Abdul-Jabbar (27)	James Worthy (13)	Magic Johnson (18)	HemisFair Arena; 10,414	30–16
47	February 7	@ Indiana	W 106–105	Kareem Abdul-Jabbar (33)	Kareem Abdul-Jabbar (9)	Magic Johnson (12)	Market Square Arena; 14,636	31–16
48	February 8	@ Boston	W 111–109	Kareem Abdul-Jabbar (27)	Johnson & Wilkes (8)	Magic Johnson (10)	Boston Garden; 14,890	32–16
49	February 10	@ Washington	L 93–96	Jamaal Wilkes (21)	James Worthy (11)	Magic Johnson (13)	Capital Centre; 19,105	32–17
50	February 12	Atlanta	W 108–87	Kareem Abdul-Jabbar (26)	Magic Johnson (10)	Magic Johnson (15)	The Forum; 15,617	33–17
51	February 17	Denver	L 138–141	Magic Johnson (33)	Magic Johnson (13)	Magic Johnson (16)	The Forum; 15,230	33–18
52	February 18	@ San Diego	W 120–116	Johnson & Wilkes (20)	Magic Johnson (7)	Magic Johnson (14)	San Diego Sports Arena; 10,502	34–18
53	February 21	Seattle	W 128–112	Jamaal Wilkes (25)	Kareem Abdul-Jabbar (7)	Magic Johnson (23)	The Forum; 17,505	35–18
54	February 22	@ Seattle	L 114–121	Magic Johnson (22)	Magic Johnson (13)	Magic Johnson (11)	Kingdome; 12,910	35–19
55	February 24	Boston	W 116–108	Kareem Abdul-Jabbar (31)	Magic Johnson (8)	Magic Johnson (18)	The Forum; 17,505	36–19
56	February 26	@ Philadelphia	W 101–99	Magic Johnson (23)	James Worthy (9)	Magic Johnson (11)	The Spectrum; 17,921	37–19
57	February 28	@ Chicago	W 124–108	Jamaal Wilkes (22)	Kurt Rambis (7)	Magic Johnson (15)	Chicago Stadium; 10,949	38–19
58	February 29	@ New Jersey	L 92–102	Kareem Abdul-Jabbar (19)	Kareem Abdul-Jabbar (8)	Magic Johnson (8)	Brendan Byrne Arena; 17,590	38–20

March : 11–4 (home: 4–3; road: 7–1)

Game	Date	Team	Score	High points	High rebounds	High assists	Location Attendance	Record
59	March 2	@ Atlanta	W 98–94	Kareem Abdul-Jabbar (30)	Kareem Abdul-Jabbar (13)	Magic Johnson (9)	The Omni; 15,413	39–20
60	March 4	@ Detroit	W 118–114	Abdul-Jabbar & Johnson (29)	Magic Johnson (14)	Michael Cooper (8)	Pontiac Silverdome; 30,104	40–20
61	March 7	Philadelphia	L 105–113	Kareem Abdul-Jabbar (29)	James Worthy (10)	Magic Johnson (11)	The Forum; 17,505	40–21
62	March 9	@ Dallas	W 121–120 (2OT)	Kareem Abdul-Jabbar (32)	Kareem Abdul-Jabbar (12)	Magic Johnson (8)	Reunion Arena; 17,007	41–21
63	March 10	Indiana	L 114–126	Kareem Abdul-Jabbar (25)	James Worthy (11)	Magic Johnson (9)	The Forum; 15,340	41–22
64	March 13	Seattle	W 114–98	Abdul-Jabbar & Scott (20)	Kareem Abdul-Jabbar (9)	Magic Johnson (13)	The Forum; 13,344	42–22
65	March 15	San Antonio	W 143–124	Kareem Abdul-Jabbar (26)	Magic Johnson (9)	Magic Johnson (8)	The Forum; 17,505	43–22
66	March 17	@ Houston	W 123–111	Kareem Abdul-Jabbar (29)	James Worthy (13)	Magic Johnson (13)	The Summit; 15,010	44–22
67	March 20	@ Milwaukee	W 99–94	Kareem Abdul-Jabbar (22)	Kurt Rambis (7)	Magic Johnson (11)	MECCA Arena; 11,052	45–22
68	March 21	@ Kansas City	W 123–116	Kareem Abdul-Jabbar (24)	Magic Johnson (12)	Magic Johnson (19)	Kemper Arena; 17,164	46–22
69	March 23	Detroit	L 118–121	Kareem Abdul-Jabbar (35)	James Worthy (9)	Magic Johnson (10)	The Forum; 17,505	46–23
70	March 25	San Diego	W 114–102	James Worthy (26)	Kurt Rambis (9)	Magic Johnson (16)	The Forum; 15,122	47–23
71	March 28	@ San Diego	L 115–122	Magic Johnson (25)	Kurt Rambis (8)	Magic Johnson (15)	San Diego Sports Arena	47–24
72	March 29	Houston	W 115–109	James Worthy (23)	Magic Johnson (11)	Magic Johnson (10)	The Forum; 15,253	48–24
73	March 31	@ Phoenix	W 119–97	Kareem Abdul-Jabbar (27)	Kareem Abdul-Jabbar (11)	Magic Johnson (13)	Arizona Veterans Memorial Coliseum; 13,032	49–24

April : 5–4 (home: 3–2; road: 2–2)

Game	Date	Team	Score	High points	High rebounds	High assists	Location Attendance	Record
74	April 1	Golden State	W 121–110	Magic Johnson (26)	Magic Johnson (9)	Magic Johnson (13)	The Forum; 13,754	50–24
75	April 3	@ San Antonio	L 109–137	Kareem Abdul-Jabbar (27)	Kurt Rambis (8)	Magic Johnson (10)	HemisFair Arena; 9,790	50–25
76	April 5	@ Utah (at Las Vegas, Nevada)	W 129–115	Byron Scott (24)	Magic Johnson (7)	Magic Johnson (12)	Thomas & Mack Center; 18,359	51–25
77	April 6	Kansas City	W 112–97	Kareem Abdul-Jabbar (22)	Kupchak & Rambis (10)	Magic Johnson (10)	The Forum; 17,505	52–25
78	April 8	@ Portland	W 119–113	James Worthy (37)	Magic Johnson (8)	Magic Johnson (12)	Memorial Coliseum; 12,666	53–25
79	April 10	@ Golden State	L 115–117	Kareem Abdul-Jabbar (28)	Kurt Rambis (13)	Magic Johnson (11)	Oakland–Alameda County Coliseum Arena; 4,262	53–26
80	April 11	Portland	W 121–108	Abdul-Jabbar & McGee (24)	Kurt Rambis (9)	Michael Cooper (9)	The Forum; 17,505	54–26
81	April 13	Dallas	L 103–104	Kareem Abdul-Jabbar (32)	Kareem Abdul-Jabbar (11)	Michael Cooper (10)	The Forum; 14,688	54–27
82	April 15	Phoenix	L 114–123	Mike McGee (21)	Kurt Rambis (10)	Michael Cooper (10)	The Forum; 14,461	54–28

1983–84 schedule

=== Playoffs ===
1984 playoff game log
Total: 14–7 (home: 9–2; road: 5–5)
Western Conference First Round: 3–0 (home: 2–0; road: 1–0)

Game	Date	Team	Score	High points	High rebounds	High assists	Location Attendance	Series
1	April 18, 1984	Kansas City	W 116–105	Magic Johnson (26)	3 players tied (7)	Magic Johnson (11)	The Forum; 13,918	1–0
2	April 20, 1984	Kansas City	W 109–102	Kareem Abdul-Jabbar (26)	Kareem Abdul-Jabbar (11)	Magic Johnson (11)	The Forum; 14,986	2–0
3	April 22, 1984	@ Kansas City	W 108–102	Kareem Abdul-Jabbar (23)	Johnson & Worthy (10)	Magic Johnson (13)	Kemper Arena; 7,261	3–0

Western Conference Semifinals: 4–1 (home: 3–0; road: 1–1)

Game	Date	Team	Score	High points	High rebounds	High assists	Location Attendance	Series
1	April 28, 1984	Dallas	W 134–91	Mike McGee (25)	Kurt Rambis (8)	Magic Johnson (11)	The Forum; 13,512	1–0
2	May 1, 1984	Dallas	W 117–101	Magic Johnson (27)	Kareem Abdul-Jabbar (10)	Magic Johnson (11)	The Forum; 15,298	2–0
3	May 4, 1984	@ Dallas	L 115–125	Magic Johnson (24)	Bob McAdoo (8)	Magic Johnson (14)	Reunion Arena; 17,007	2–1
4	May 6, 1984	@ Dallas	W 122–115 (OT)	Kareem Abdul-Jabbar (33)	Abdul-Jabbar & Johnson (11)	Magic Johnson (16)	Reunion Arena; 17,007	3–1
5	May 8, 1984	Dallas	W 115–99	Mike McGee (27)	3 players tied (6)	Magic Johnson (15)	The Forum; 16,644	4–1

Western Conference Finals: 4–2 (home: 2–1; road: 2–1)

Game	Date	Team	Score	High points	High rebounds	High assists	Location Attendance	Series
1	May 12, 1984	Phoenix	W 110–94	Bob McAdoo (20)	Kareem Abdul-Jabbar (10)	Michael Cooper (10)	The Forum; 12,825	1–0
2	May 15, 1984	Phoenix	W 118–102	Kareem Abdul-Jabbar (21)	Kareem Abdul-Jabbar (10)	Magic Johnson (24)	The Forum; 16,578	2–0
3	May 18, 1984	@ Phoenix	L 127–135	Kareem Abdul-Jabbar (31)	3 players tied (8)	Magic Johnson (13)	Arizona Veterans Memorial Coliseum; 14,660	2–1
4	May 20, 1984	@ Phoenix	W 126–115	Kareem Abdul-Jabbar (31)	3 players tied (7)	Magic Johnson (15)	Arizona Veterans Memorial Coliseum; 14,660	3–1
5	May 23, 1984	Phoenix	L 121–126	Kareem Abdul-Jabbar (28)	Bob McAdoo (8)	Magic Johnson (13)	The Forum; 16,848	3–2
6	May 25, 1984	@ Phoenix	W 99–97	James Worthy (22)	Magic Johnson (11)	Magic Johnson (13)	Arizona Veterans Memorial Coliseum; 14,660	4–2

NBA Finals: 3–4 (home: 2–1; road: 1–3)

Game	Date	Team	Score	High points	High rebounds	High assists	Location Attendance	Series
1	May 27, 1984	@ Boston	W 115–109	Kareem Abdul-Jabbar (32)	Kareem Abdul-Jabbar (8)	Magic Johnson (10)	Boston Garden; 14,890	1–0
2	May 31, 1984	@ Boston	L 121–124 (OT)	James Worthy (29)	Magic Johnson (10)	Magic Johnson (10)	Boston Garden; 14,890	1–1
3	June 3, 1984	Boston	W 137–104	Kareem Abdul-Jabbar (34)	Magic Johnson (11)	Magic Johnson (21)	The Forum; 17,505	2–1
4	June 6, 1984	Boston	L 125–129 (OT)	Kareem Abdul-Jabbar (32)	Magic Johnson (11)	Magic Johnson (17)	The Forum; 17,505	2–2
5	June 8, 1984	@ Boston	L 103–121	James Worthy (22)	Kurt Rambis (9)	Magic Johnson (13)	Boston Garden; 14,890	2–3
6	June 10, 1984	Boston	W 119–108	Kareem Abdul-Jabbar (30)	Kareem Abdul-Jabbar (10)	Magic Johnson (10)	The Forum; 17,505	3–3
7	June 12, 1984	@ Boston	L 102–111	James Worthy (21)	Kurt Rambis (9)	Magic Johnson (15)	Boston Garden; 14,890	3–4

1984 schedule

== Awards and records ==
- Kareem Abdul-Jabbar, All-NBA First Team
- Magic Johnson, All-NBA First Team
- Michael Cooper, NBA All-Defensive First Team
- Kareem Abdul-Jabbar, NBA All-Defensive Second Team
- Byron Scott, NBA All-Rookie Team 1st Team
