= Bruce Kuczenski =

American basketball player (born 1961)

Personal information
- Born: February 3, 1961 (age 65) Bristol, Connecticut, U.S.
- Listed height: 6 ft 10 in (2.08 m)
- Listed weight: 230 lb (104 kg)

Career information
- High school: Bristol (Bristol, Connecticut)
- College: UConn (1979–1983)
- NBA draft: 1983: 3rd round, 59th overall pick
- Drafted by: New Jersey Nets
- Playing career: 1983–1989
- Position: Power forward / center
- Number: 23, 7

Career history
- 1983: New Jersey Nets
- 1984: Philadelphia 76ers
- 1984: Indiana Pacers
- 1984: Puerto Rico Coquis
- 1984–1985: Albany Patroons
- 1985: Connecticut Colonials
- 1985–1986: Valladolid
- 1986–1987: Verviers-Pepinster
- 1987–1988: Reims
- 1988–1989: Fribourg
- Stats at NBA.com
- Stats at Basketball Reference

Bruce John Kuczenski (born February 3, 1961) is an American former professional basketball player. He was a 6-foot-10-inch (208 cm) 230 pounds (100 kg) power forward/center born in Bristol, Connecticut and played collegiately at the University of Connecticut from 1979 to 1983.

Kuczenski was selected with the 12th pick of the 3rd round of the 1983 NBA draft by the New Jersey Nets. In his only NBA season, 1983–84, he played with the Nets, Philadelphia 76ers and Indiana Pacers, playing 15 games, averaging 1.9 points and 1.5 rebounds per game. He also played in the CBA for the Puerto Rico Coquis and for the Albany Patroons.

After his NBA and CBA career he played six years in Europe. Kuczenski signed with Valladolid of Spain, where he averaged 12.8 points and 5.4 rebonds per contest. After a stint in Belgium, he joined Reims of the French Nationale 1A league: In 30 contests of the 1987–88 season, he scored 20.8 points, while grabbing 8.7 rebounds a game. In 1988, Kuczenski moved to Fribourg Olympic Basket. In the 1988–89 season, he pulled down 15.5 rebounds per contest. He left the team because of an injury in fall 1989.

== Career statistics ==
Legend
GP	Games played	GS	Games started	MPG	Minutes per game
FG%	Field goal percentage	3P%	3-point field goal percentage	FT%	Free throw percentage
RPG	Rebounds per game	APG	Assists per game	SPG	Steals per game
BPG	Blocks per game	PPG	Points per game	**Bold**	Career high

=== NBA ===
==== Regular season ====
Year	Team	GP	GS	MPG	FG%	3P%	FT%	RPG	APG	SPG	BPG	PPG
1983–84	New Jersey	**7**	0	4.0	**.333**	–	.500	1.1	.6	.0	.0	1.6
1983–84	Philadelphia	3	**2**	**13.3**	.125	–	.500	**2.0**	**.7**	**.3**	**.3**	1.0
1983–84	PIndiana	5	0	10.2	.294	–	**1.000**	1.8	.4	.0	.0	**2.8**
Career		15	2	7.9	.270	–	.667	1.5	.5	.1	.1	1.9
