= Ken Austin (basketball) =

American basketball player (born 1961)

Personal information
- Born: December 15, 1961 (age 64) Los Angeles, California
- Listed height: 6 ft 9 in (2.06 m)
- Listed weight: 205 lb (93 kg)

Career information
- High school: Verbum Dei (Los Angeles, California)
- College: Rice (1979–1983)
- NBA draft: 1983: 4th round, 101st overall pick
- Drafted by: Detroit Pistons
- Playing career: 1983–1994
- Position: Power forward
- Number: 34

Career history
- 1983–1984: Detroit Spirits
- 1984: Detroit Pistons
- 1984: Puerto Rico Coquis
- 1984–1985: RCD Espanyol
- 1985–1986: Basket Groot Leuven
- 1986–1987: Nasas
- 1987–1989: Cholet
- 1989–1990: ASVEL Basket
- 1993–1994: Atlético Echagüe
- Stats at NBA.com
- Stats at Basketball Reference

Kenneth Eugene Austin (born December 15, 1961) is a retired American basketball player.

== Early life and education ==
Born in Los Angeles, California, he played collegiately for Rice University.

== Career ==
He was selected by the Detroit Pistons in the fourth round (101st pick overall) of the 1983 NBA draft.

He played for the Pistons (1983–84) in the National Basketball Association for seven games.

== Career statistics ==
Legend
| GP | Games played | GS | Games started | MPG | Minutes per game |
| FG% | Field goal percentage | 3P% | 3-point field goal percentage | FT% | Free throw percentage |
| RPG | Rebounds per game | APG | Assists per game | SPG | Steals per game |
| BPG | Blocks per game | PPG | Points per game | **Bold** | Career high |

=== NBA ===
==== Regular season ====
| Year | Team | GP | GS | MPG | FG% | 3P% | FT% | RPG | APG | SPG | BPG | PPG |
|---|---|---|---|---|---|---|---|---|---|---|---|---|
| 1983–84 | Detroit | 7 | 0 | 4.0 | .462 | – | – | .4 | .1 | .1 | .1 | 1.7 |
