= 1983–84 Detroit Pistons season =

NBA team season

- Head coach: Chuck Daly
- General manager: Jack McCloskey
- Owners: William Davidson
- Arena: Pontiac Silverdome

Results
- Record: 49–33 (.598)
- Place: Division: 2nd (Central); Conference: 4th (Eastern)
- Playoff finish: First round (lost to Knicks 2–3)
- Stats at Basketball Reference

The 1983–84 Detroit Pistons season was the Detroit Pistons' 36th season in the NBA and 27th season in the city of Detroit. The team played at the Pontiac Silverdome in suburban Pontiac, Michigan.

During the 1984 playoffs against the New York Knicks, the Silverdome had a venue conflict that forced the team to play their last playoff game in Detroit proper at the Detroit Red Wings' home, Joe Louis Arena, in the fifth and deciding game of the round. The team would play a number of home games, both regular season and post-season, at the venue over the next few seasons (due to the roof collapsing) before eventually getting an arena of their own four years later.

New coach Chuck Daly made an immediate impact on the team, leading the Pistons to their first winning season and post-season berth since the 1976-77 season. Detroit finished with a 49-33 (.598) record, 2nd in the Central Division. In the first round series, the Pistons faced off with the New York Knicks and star Bernard King. The tightly contested series went to a 5th game at a sold-out Joe Louis Arena in downtown Detroit. The Pistons trailed by eight points with 1:34 remaining in the fourth quarter, when Thomas caught fire, scoring 16 points in the remaining 94 seconds to force overtime, but it wasn't enough to overcome King's 44 points as the Pistons fell 127–123 in a playoff classic.

Part of the 5th game in the series was the atmosphere as the Pistons returned to the city proper after moving to the Silverdome in 1978. Thomas said, "I must say that it was a wild scene. Coleman Young called me up and said, ‘Welcome to the city.’ Everybody in the hood was like, ‘Zeke, you’re coming to put on a show tonight.’ And being a city guy, it was almost like you were going home. When I got into Joe Louis, the atmosphere was so electric, it was awesome. You can't describe it—it made you want to get off. I just felt like I could do anything. The fans were screaming and every move you made, people were oohing and aahing—it was sweet. I'm not a Baptist; I was raised Catholic. But sometimes I'd go to a Baptist church and you'll see what they call the Holy Ghost, where the spirit will take over their body and it moves them. During that game I got the Holy Ghost — I just got the spirit into my body and I was doing stuff and making moves — I felt I was above the court looking at everybody and I could just do anything. It was great!"

Detroit was led on the season by guard Thomas (21.3 ppg, 11.1 apg, NBA All-Star), center Bill Laimbeer (17.3 ppg, 12.2 rpg, NBA All-Star) and forward Kelly Tripucka (21.3 ppg, NBA All-Star).

On Dec 13, 1983, the Pistons finished 3OT with the Nuggets. The Pistons beat the Nuggets 186-184. This is the highest scoring game in NBA history. Thomas scored 47. Kiki Vandeweghe scored 51 and Alex English also scored 47 points.

== Draft picks ==
Round	Pick	Player	Position	Nationality	College
1	8	Antoine Carr	PF/C	United States	Wichita State
5	101	Ken Austin	PF	United States	Rice

== Roster ==
No.	Name	Pos.	Height	Weight	DOB (YYYY-MM-DD)	From
34	Ken Austin	SF	6-9	205	1961-07-15	Rice
54	Kent Benson	C	6-10	235	1954-12-27	Indiana
23	Earl Cureton	C	6-9	210	1957-09-03	Detroit Mercy
9	Lionel Hollins	PG	6-3	185	1953-10-19	Arizona State
15	Vinnie Johnson	SG	6-2	200	1956-09-01	Baylor
40	Bill Laimbeer	C	6-11	245	1957-05-19	Notre Dame
53	Cliff Levingston	PF	6-8	210	1961-01-04	Wichita State
25	John Long	SG	6-5	195	1956-08-28	Detroit Mercy
33	Walker Russell	PG	6-5	195	1960-10-21	Western Michigan
22	David Thirdkill	SF	6-7	195	1960-04-12	Bradley
11	Isiah Thomas	PG	6-1	180	1961-04-30	Indiana
24	Ray Tolbert		6-9	225	1958-09-10	Indiana
7	Kelly Tripucka	SF	6-6	220	1959-02-16	Notre Dame
41	Terry Tyler	SF	6-7	215	1956-10-30	Detroit Mercy

== Regular season ==
=== Season standings ===
Central Division	W	L	PCT	GB	Home	Road	Div
y-Milwaukee Bucks	50	32	.610	–	30–11	20–21	19–10
x-Detroit Pistons	49	33	.598	1	30–11	19–22	21–8
x-Atlanta Hawks	40	42	.488	10	31–10	9–32	16–14
Cleveland Cavaliers	28	54	.341	22	23–18	5–36	11–19
Chicago Bulls	27	55	.329	23	18–23	9–32	10–20
Indiana Pacers	26	56	.317	24	20–21	6–35	12–18

#	Eastern Conference				
#	Team	W	L	PCT	GB
1	z-Boston Celtics	62	20	.756	–
2	y-Milwaukee Bucks	50	32	.610	12
3	x-Philadelphia 76ers	52	30	.634	10
4	x-Detroit Pistons	49	33	.598	13
5	x-New York Knicks	47	35	.573	15
6	x-New Jersey Nets	45	37	.549	17
7	x-Atlanta Hawks	40	42	.488	22
8	x-Washington Bullets	35	47	.427	27
9	Cleveland Cavaliers	28	54	.341	34
10	Chicago Bulls	27	55	.329	35
11	Indiana Pacers	26	56	.317	36

z - clinched division title
y - clinched division title
x - clinched playoff spot

== Game log ==
=== Regular season ===
1983–84 game log
Total: 49–33 (home: 30–11; road: 19–22)
October: 1–1 (home: 1–0; road: 0–1)

Game	Date	Team	Score	High points	High rebounds	High assists	Location Attendance	Record
1	October 28	Boston	W 127–121				Pontiac Silverdome	1–0

November: 7–8 (home: 6–2; road: 1–6)

Game	Date	Team	Score	High points	High rebounds	High assists	Location Attendance	Record
3	November 1	Milwaukee	W 106–93				Pontiac Silverdome	2–1
7	November 11	@ Boston	L 118–126				Boston Garden	3–4
11	November 18	Utah	W 128–120				Pontiac Silverdome	6–5
12	November 19	@ New York	L 101–104 (OT)				Madison Square Garden	6–6
16	November 27	@ Boston	L 99–114				Boston Garden	7–9

December: 8–5 (home: 5–2; road: 3–3)

Game	Date	Team	Score	High points	High rebounds	High assists	Location Attendance	Record
24	December 17	Boston	L 115–129				Pontiac Silverdome	11–13
25	December 20	Dallas	W 116–104				Pontiac Silverdome	12–13
29	December 28	@ New York	W 111–108				Madison Square Garden	15–14

January: 7–6 (home: 4–2; road: 3–4)

Game	Date	Team	Score	High points	High rebounds	High assists	Location Attendance	Record
32	January 4	Phoenix	W 128–114				Pontiac Silverdome	17–15
33	January 6	New York	W 118–107				Pontiac Silverdome	18–15
34	January 8	@ Milwaukee	W 111–100				MECCA Arena	19–15
39	January 18	New Jersey	L 115–124				Pontiac Silverdome	22–17
41	January 21	@ New Jersey	L 103–120				Brendan Byrne Arena	23–18

February: 11–4 (home: 6–1; road: 5–3)

Game	Date	Team	Score	High points	High rebounds	High assists	Location Attendance	Record
46	February 5	@ Boston	L 134–137 (OT)				Boston Garden	25–21
51	February 18	@ Dallas	W 120–115				Reunion Arena	29–22
54	February 22	New York	W 114–111				Pontiac Silverdome	31–23

March: 10–7 (home: 5–4; road: 5–3)

Game	Date	Team	Score	High points	High rebounds	High assists	Location Attendance	Record
59	March 2	New York	L 102–117				Pontiac Silverdome	34–25
60	March 4	Los Angeles	L 114–118				Pontiac Silverdome	34–26
63	March 9	New Jersey	W 122–118				Pontiac Silverdome	37–26
65	March 13	@ Milwaukee	L 95–116				MECCA Arena	38–27
67	March 16	New Jersey	L 108–117				Pontiac Silverdome	38–29
68	March 19	@ Utah	L 125–143				Salt Palace Acord Arena	38–30
70	March 23	@ Los Angeles	W 121–118				The Forum	40–30
71	March 24	@ Phoenix	W 120–109				Arizona Veterans Memorial Coliseum	41–30
41	March 29	@ New Jersey	L 116–118				Brendan Byrne Arena	43–31
75	March 31	Milwaukee	W 107–105				Pontiac Silverdome	44–31

April: 5–2 (home: 3–0; road: 2–2)

Game	Date	Team	Score	High points	High rebounds	High assists	Location Attendance	Record
77	April 6	@ New York	W 115–107				Madison Square Garden	46–31
78	April 7	@ Milwaukee	L 92–110				MECCA Arena	46–32
81	April 13	Boston	W 128–120 (OT)				Pontiac Silverdome	49–32

1983–84 schedule

=== Playoffs ===
1984 playoff game log
Eastern Conference First Round: 2–3 (home: 1–2; road: 1–1)

Game	Date	Team	Score	High points	High rebounds	High assists	Location Attendance	Series
1	April 17	New York	L 93–94	Kelly Tripucka (26)	Kent Benson (14)	Isiah Thomas (9)	Pontiac Silverdome; 14,127	0–1
2	April 19	New York	W 113–105	Bill Laimbeer (31)	Bill Laimbeer (15)	Isiah Thomas (13)	Pontiac Silverdome; 14,275	1–1
3	April 22	@ New York	L 113–120	Kelly Tripucka (40)	Bill Laimbeer (10)	Isiah Thomas (5)	Madison Square Garden; 16,354	1–2
4	April 25	@ New York	W 119–112	Isiah Thomas (22)	Bill Laimbeer (10)	Isiah Thomas (16)	Madison Square Garden; 18,205	2–2
5	April 27	New York	L 123–127 (OT)	Isiah Thomas (35)	Bill Laimbeer (17)	Isiah Thomas (12)	Joe Louis Arena; 21,208	2–3

1984 schedule

== Awards and records ==
- Isiah Thomas, All-NBA First Team

== See also ==
- 1983-84 NBA season
