= Rickey Brown =

American basketball player (born 1958)

Personal information
- Born: August 20, 1958 (age 68) Madison County, Mississippi, U.S.
- Listed height: 6 ft 10 in (2.08 m)
- Listed weight: 215 lb (98 kg)

Career information
- High school: West Fulton (Atlanta, Georgia)
- College: Mississippi State (1976–1980)
- NBA draft: 1980: 1st round, 13th overall pick
- Drafted by: Golden State Warriors
- Playing career: 1980–1995
- Position: Power forward / center
- Number: 32, 23, 31

Career history
- 1980–1983: Golden State Warriors
- 1983–1985: Atlanta Hawks
- 1985–1987: Basket Brescia
- 1987–1988: Olimpia Tracer Milano
- 1988–1990: Unicaja Málaga
- 1990–1991: Reyer Venezia Mestre
- 1991–1993: Real Madrid
- 1993–1994: Libertas Livorno
- 1994–1995: BC Andorra
- 1995: Tau Cerámica

Career highlights
- EuroLeague champion (1988); First-team All-SEC (1980)

Career NBA statistics
- Points: 1,482 (4.4 ppg)
- Rebounds: 1,200 (3.5 rpg)
- Blocks: 114 (0.3 bpg)
- Stats at NBA.com
- Stats at Basketball Reference

Rickey Darnell Brown (born August 20, 1958) is an American former professional basketball player. At a height of 2.08 m (6 ft 10 in) tall, he played at the power forward and center positions.

== High school ==
Brown attended and played high school basketball at West Fulton High School, in Atlanta, Georgia.

== College career ==
Brown played NCAA Division I college basketball at Mississippi State University, with the Mississippi State Bulldogs, from 1976 to 1980.

== Professional career ==
Brown was selected by the Golden State Warriors, in the first round (13th pick overall) of the 1980 NBA draft. He played with the Warriors, from 1980 to 1982. He then played with the Atlanta Hawks, from 1982 to 1985. He played in a total of 340 NBA games.

In 1985, he moved to Italy, to play with Basket Brescia. In the 1987–88 season, he won the EuroLeague championship, while playing with Tracer Milano. He next played with Caja de Ronda and Reyer Venezia Mestre. He played with Real Madrid, from 1991 to 1993, and with them, he won the Saporta Cup championship in 1992, the Spanish League championship in 1993, and the Spanish King's Cup in 1993. In the 1995–96 season, he played briefly with Baskonia.

== Personal life ==
His son, Taylor Brown, is also a professional basketball player.

== Career statistics ==
Legend
GP	Games played	GS	Games started	MPG	Minutes per game
FG%	Field goal percentage	3P%	3-point field goal percentage	FT%	Free throw percentage
RPG	Rebounds per game	APG	Assists per game	SPG	Steals per game
BPG	Blocks per game	PPG	Points per game	**Bold**	Career high

=== NBA ===
==== Regular season ====
Year	Team	GP	GS	MPG	FG%	3P%	FT%	RPG	APG	SPG	BPG	PPG
1980–81	Golden State	45		12.9	**.512**	–	**.762**	3.7	**.5**	.2	.3	4.0
1981–82	Golden State	**82**	**11**	**15.4**	.459	–	.705	**4.4**	.2	**.4**	**.4**	**5.7**
1982–83	Golden State	50	7	14.9	.482	.000	.615	3.6	.3	.2	**.4**	5.5
1982–83	Atlanta	26	0	11.7	.471	.000	.625	3.4	.3	.2	.2	4.7
1983–84	Atlanta	68	3	11.5	.468	–	.738	2.7	.4	.3	.3	3.5
1984–85	Atlanta	69	5	11.8	.406	–	.574	3.2	.4	.3	.3	2.8
Career		340	26	13.2	.464	.000	.667	3.5	.4	.3	.3	4.4

==== Playoffs ====
Year	Team	GP	MPG	FG%	3P%	FT%	RPG	APG	SPG	BPG	PPG
1983	Atlanta	2	7.5	.333	–	.500	1.5	.0	.0	.0	1.5
1984	Atlanta	**5**	**16.6**	**.476**	–	**.833**	**3.8**	**.4**	.0	**.2**	**6.0**
Career		7	14.0	.458	–	.786	3.1	.3	.0	.1	4.7
