= 1983–84 New York Knicks season =

Season of National Basketball Association team the New York Knicks

- Head coach: Hubie Brown
- General manager: Dave DeBusschere
- Owners: Gulf+Western
- Arena: Madison Square Garden

Results
- Record: 47–35 (.573)
- Place: Division: 3rd (Atlantic); Conference: 5th (Eastern)
- Playoff finish: East Semifinals (Eliminated 3–4)
- Stats at Basketball Reference

Local media
- Television: WOR-TV (Marv Albert, Butch Beard); MSG Network (Jim Karvellas, Butch Beard)
- Radio: WNEW (Marv Albert, John Andariese)

The 1983–84 New York Knicks season was the 38th season for the team in the National Basketball Association (NBA). In the regular season, the Knicks had a 47–35 record, and qualified for the NBA playoffs as the fifth seed in the Eastern Conference. New York was led by small forward Bernard King, who averaged 26.3 points per game (PPG) in the regular season and 34.8 PPG in the playoffs. In early 1984, King scored 50 points in consecutive games, against the San Antonio Spurs and Dallas Mavericks.

In the opening round of the 1984 NBA Playoffs, the Knicks faced the Detroit Pistons. The teams split the first four games, as the Knicks won the first and third games. However, they were unable to clinch the series in Game 4, held in Madison Square Garden, their home arena. In the fifth and deciding game, held in Detroit's Joe Louis Arena, the Knicks held a 106–98 lead with less than two minutes remaining when Pistons point guard Isiah Thomas scored 16 points in a 94-second span. The game went into overtime, where New York won the game 127–123. King, despite playing with two dislocated fingers and the flu, scored 44 points in the game and 213 points in the series. His point total was the highest in NBA history by a player in a five-game series. After the Detroit series, the Knicks were matched with the Boston Celtics. In a seven-game series, the Celtics defeated New York.

== Draft picks ==
Note: This is not an extensive list; it only covers the first round and notable post-first-round picks.

Round	Pick	Player	Position	Nationality	School/Club team
1	12	Darrell Walker	G	United States	Arkansas

== Regular season ==
=== Season standings ===
Atlantic Division	W	L	PCT	GB	Home	Road	Div
y-Boston Celtics	62	20	.756	–	33–8	29–12	13–11
x-Philadelphia 76ers	52	30	.634	10	32–9	20–21	15–9
x-New York Knicks	47	35	.573	15	29–12	18–23	12–12
x-New Jersey Nets	45	37	.549	17	29–12	16–25	12–12
x-Washington Bullets	35	47	.427	27	25–16	10–31	8–16

#	Eastern Conference				
#	Team	W	L	PCT	GB
1	z-Boston Celtics	62	20	.756	–
2	y-Milwaukee Bucks	50	32	.610	12
3	x-Philadelphia 76ers	52	30	.634	10
4	x-Detroit Pistons	49	33	.598	13
5	x-New York Knicks	47	35	.573	15
6	x-New Jersey Nets	45	37	.549	17
7	x-Atlanta Hawks	40	42	.488	22
8	x-Washington Bullets	35	47	.427	27
9	Cleveland Cavaliers	28	54	.341	34
10	Chicago Bulls	27	55	.329	35
11	Indiana Pacers	26	56	.317	36

z – clinched division title
y – clinched division title
x – clinched playoff spot

== Game log ==
=== Regular season ===
1983–84 game log
Total: 47–35 (Home: 29–12; Road: 18–23)
October: 2–0 (home: 1–0; road: 1–0)

Game	Date	Team	Score	High points	High rebounds	High assists	Location Attendance	Record
1	October 28, 1983	@ Cleveland	W 113–106				Richfield Coliseum	1–0
2	October 29, 1983	Washington	W 100–97				Madison Square Garden	2–0

November: 9–6 (home: 6–1; road: 3–5)

Game	Date	Team	Score	High points	High rebounds	High assists	Location Attendance	Record
3	November 2, 1983	@ Seattle	L 111–125				Kingdome	2–1
4	November 4, 1983	@ Portland	L 97–106				Memorial Coliseum	2–2
5	November 5, 1983	@ Golden State	L 100–102				Oakland–Alameda County Coliseum Arena	2–3
6	November 8, 1983	Milwaukee	L 90–97				Madison Square Garden	2–4
7	November 10, 1983	@ Indiana	W 99–91				Market Square Arena	3–4
8	November 11, 1983	San Diego	W 116–95				Madison Square Garden	4–4
9	November 15, 1983	Indiana	W 94–87				Madison Square Garden	5–4
10	November 16, 1983	@ Philadelphia	L 97–102				The Spectrum	5–5
11	November 18, 1983	@ Boston	W 110–103				Boston Garden	6–5
12	November 19, 1983	Detroit	W 104–101 (OT)				Madison Square Garden	7–5
13	November 22, 1983	Boston	W 117–113 (2OT)				Madison Square Garden	8–5
14	November 26, 1983	Cleveland	W 96–84				Madison Square Garden	9–5
15	November 27, 1983	@ Indiana	L 91–101				Market Square Arena	9–6
16	November 29, 1983	San Antonio	W 118–106				Madison Square Garden	10–6
17	November 30, 1983	@ New Jersey	W 113–104				Brendan Byrne Arena	11–6

December: 6–8 (home: 4–4; road: 2–4)

Game	Date	Team	Score	High points	High rebounds	High assists	Location Attendance	Record
18	December 1, 1983	Washington	W 127–93				Madison Square Garden	12–6
19	December 3, 1983	Houston	W 117–101				Madison Square Garden	13–6
20	December 6, 1983	Denver	L 112–117				Madison Square Garden	13–7
21	December 8, 1983	@ Phoenix	L 97–120				Arizona Veterans Memorial Coliseum	13–8
22	December 9, 1983	@ San Diego	W 111–92				San Diego Sports Arena	14–8
23	December 11, 1983	@ Los Angeles	W 109–98				The Forum	15–8
24	December 13, 1983	Boston	L 100–102				Madison Square Garden	15–9
25	December 15, 1983	Chicago	L 107–113				Madison Square Garden	15–10
26	December 17, 1983	Milwaukee	W 102–96				Madison Square Garden	16–10
27	December 23, 1983	@ Atlanta	L 113–114 (2OT)				The Omni	16–11
28	December 25, 1983	New Jersey	W 112–110 (OT)				Madison Square Garden	17–11
29	December 27, 1983	@ Chicago	L 96–102				Chicago Stadium	17–12
30	December 28, 1983	Detroit	L 108–111				Madison Square Garden	17–13
31	December 30, 1983	@ Washington	L 86–91				Capital Centre	17–14

January: 8–4 (home: 5–2; road: 3–2)

Game	Date	Team	Score	High points	High rebounds	High assists	Location Attendance	Record
32	January 3, 1984	Los Angeles	W 117–105				Madison Square Garden	18–14
33	January 6, 1984	@ Detroit	L 107–118				Pontiac Silverdome	18–15
34	January 7, 1984	Indiana	W 140–103				Madison Square Garden	19–15
35	January 9, 1984	Philadelphia	W 111–73				Madison Square Garden	20–15
36	January 13, 1984	@ Milwaukee	L 101–103				MECCA Arena	20–16
37	January 14, 1984	@ Chicago	W 113–111				Chicago Stadium	21–16
38	January 17, 1984	New Jersey	L 115–121				Madison Square Garden	21–17
39	January 19, 1984	Chicago	W 109–92				Madison Square Garden	22–17
40	January 21, 1984	Atlanta	L 95–97				Madison Square Garden	22–18
41	January 24, 1984	Philadelphia	W 111–102				Madison Square Garden	23–18
42	January 26, 1984	@ Washington	W 104–97				Capital Centre	24–18
All-Star Break
43	January 31, 1984	@ San Antonio	W 117–113				HemisFair Arena	25–18

February: 10–6 (home: 4–1; road: 6–5)

Game	Date	Team	Score	High points	High rebounds	High assists	Location Attendance	Record
44	February 1, 1984	@ Dallas	W 105–98				Reunion Arena	26–18
45	February 4, 1984	@ Houston	W 103–95				The Summit	27–18
46	February 6, 1984	Golden State	W 116–94				Madison Square Garden	28–18
47	February 8, 1984	@ Milwaukee	L 103–113				MECCA Arena	28–19
48	February 10, 1984	@ Utah	W 121–111				Salt Palace Acord Arena	29–19
49	February 11, 1984	@ Denver	W 138–112				McNichols Sports Arena	30–19
50	February 14, 1984	@ Kansas City	W 106–100				Kemper Arena	31–19
51	February 16, 1984	Indiana	W 100–94				Madison Square Garden	32–19
52	February 18, 1984	New Jersey	W 112–102				Madison Square Garden	33–19
53	February 19, 1984	@ Philadelphia	L 97–101				The Spectrum	33–20
54	February 21, 1984	Portland	L 89–106				Madison Square Garden	33–21
55	February 22, 1984	@ Detroit	L 111–114				Pontiac Silverdome	33–22
56	February 24, 1984	@ Atlanta	L 104–105 (OT)				The Omni	33–23
57	February 25, 1984	@ New Jersey	L 104–117				Brendan Byrne Arena	33–24
58	February 27, 1984	Atlanta	W 96–92				Madison Square Garden	34–24
59	February 29, 1984	@ Boston	W 102–98				Boston Garden	35–24

March: 8–7 (home: 7–2; road: 1–5)

Game	Date	Team	Score	High points	High rebounds	High assists	Location Attendance	Record
60	March 2, 1984	@ Detroit	W 117–102				Pontiac Silverdome	36–24
61	March 3, 1984	Milwaukee	L 106–111				Madison Square Garden	36–25
62	March 6, 1984	Seattle	W 124–110				Madison Square Garden	37–25
63	March 10, 1984	Utah	W 114–105				Madison Square Garden	38–25
64	March 13, 1984	Phoenix	W 117–96				Madison Square Garden	39–25
65	March 15, 1984	Cleveland	W 105–82				Madison Square Garden	40–25
66	March 17, 1984	Kansas City	W 123–109				Madison Square Garden	41–25
67	March 21, 1984	@ Cleveland	L 99–100				Richfield Coliseum	41–26
68	March 22, 1984	Boston	L 100–108				Madison Square Garden	41–27
69	March 24, 1984	Washington	W 107–99				Madison Square Garden	42–27
70	March 25, 1984	@ New Jersey	L 94–107				Brendan Byrne Arena	42–28
71	March 27, 1984	Dallas	W 97–88				Madison Square Garden	43–28
72	March 28, 1984	@ Indiana	L 93–99				Market Square Arena	43–29
73	March 30, 1984	@ Washington	L 79–107				Capital Centre	43–30
74	March 31, 1984	@ Atlanta	L 106–109				The Omni	43–31

April: 4–4 (home: 2–2; road: 2–2)

Game	Date	Team	Score	High points	High rebounds	High assists	Location Attendance	Record
75	April 2, 1984	Chicago	W 115–113				Madison Square Garden	44–31
76	April 3, 1984	@ Chicago	W 113–96				Chicago Stadium	45–31
77	April 6, 1984	Detroit	L 104–101				Madison Square Garden	45–32
78	April 8, 1984	@ Philadelphia	L 108–109				The Spectrum	45–33
79	April 9, 1984	Cleveland	W 107–98				Madison Square Garden	46–33
80	April 11, 1984	@ Boston	L 96–102				Boston Garden	46–34
81	April 13, 1984	@ Cleveland	W 107–98				Richfield Coliseum	47–34
82	April 14, 1984	Philadelphia	L 100–103				Madison Square Garden	47–35

1983–84 schedule

=== Playoffs ===
1984 playoff game log
Eastern Conference First Round: 3–2 (home: 1–1; road: 2–1)

Game	Date	Team	Score	High points	High rebounds	High assists	Location Attendance	Series
1	April 17, 1984	@ Detroit	W 94–93	Bernard King (36)	Bill Cartwright (11)	Darrell Walker (7)	Pontiac Silverdome; 14,127	1–0
2	April 19, 1984	@ Detroit	L 105–113	Bernard King (46)	Truck Robinson (11)	Ray Williams (9)	Pontiac Silverdome; 14,275	1–1
3	April 22, 1984	Detroit	W 120–113	Bernard King (46)	Bernard King (10)	Rory Sparrow (10)	Madison Square Garden; 16,354	2–1
4	April 25, 1984	Detroit	L 112–119	Bernard King (41)	Truck Robinson (12)	Rory Sparrow (10)	Madison Square Garden; 18,205	2–2
5	April 27, 1984	@ Detroit	W 127–123 (OT)	Bernard King (44)	Bernard King (12)	Ray Williams (12)	Joe Louis Arena; 21,208	3–2

Eastern Conference Semifinals: 3–4 (home: 3–0; road: 0–4)

Game	Date	Team	Score	High points	High rebounds	High assists	Location Attendance	Series
1	April 29, 1984	@ Boston	L 92–110	Bernard King (26)	Truck Robinson (9)	Rory Sparrow (6)	Boston Garden; 14,890	0–1
2	May 2, 1984	@ Boston	L 102–116	Bill Cartwright (25)	Bill Cartwright (11)	Rory Sparrow (5)	Boston Garden; 14,890	0–2
3	May 4, 1984	Boston	W 100–92	Bill Cartwright (25)	King, Robinson (9)	Rory Sparrow (10)	Madison Square Garden; 19,591	1–2
4	May 6, 1984	Boston	W 118–113	Bernard King (43)	Truck Robinson (9)	Ray Williams (9)	Madison Square Garden; 15,840	2–2
5	May 9, 1984	@ Boston	L 99–121	Bernard King (30)	Bill Cartwright (10)	Ray Williams (10)	Boston Garden; 14,890	2–3
6	May 11, 1984	Boston	W 106–104	Bernard King (44)	Bill Cartwright (14)	Rory Sparrow (11)	Madison Square Garden; 19,591	3–3
7	May 13, 1984	@ Boston	L 104–121	Bernard King (24)	Truck Robinson (9)	Ray Williams (7)	Boston Garden; 14,890	3–4

1984 schedule

== Player statistics ==
Legend
GP	Games played	GS	Games started	MPG	Minutes per game
FG%	Field-goal percentage	3P%	3-point field-goal percentage	FT%	Free-throw percentage
RPG	Rebounds per game	APG	Assists per game	SPG	Steals per game
BPG	Blocks per game	PPG	Points per game

== Awards and records ==
- Bernard King, All-NBA First Team
- Darrell Walker, NBA All-Rookie Team 1st Team

== See also ==
- 1983–84 NBA season
