= 1983–84 Milwaukee Bucks season =

NBA professional basketball team season

- Division champions
- Head coach: Don Nelson
- General manager: Don Nelson
- Owner: Jim Fitzgerald
- Arena: MECCA Arena

Results
- Record: 50–32 (.610)
- Place: Division: 1st (Central); Conference: 2nd (Eastern)
- Playoff finish: Conference finals (lost to Celtics 1–4)
- Stats at Basketball Reference

The 1983–84 Milwaukee Bucks season was the Bucks' 16th season in the NBA. For the first time since 1974–75 season, Brian Winters was not on the opening day roster.

== Draft picks ==
Round	Pick	Player	Position	Nationality	College
1	18	Randy Breuer	C	United States	Minnesota
2	41	Ted Kitchel	F	United States	Indiana
2	42	Mike Davis		United States	Alabama
3	65	Billy Goodwin		United States	St. John's
4	88	Mark Nickens		United States	American
5	111	Mark Petteway		United States	New Orleans
6	120	Russell Todd		United States	West Virginia
6	134	Charles Hurt		United States	Kentucky
7	157	Anthony Hicks		United States	Xavier
8	180	Brett Burkholder		United States	DePaul
9	202	Bill Varner		United States	Notre Dame
10	223	Bob Kelly		United States	St. John's

== Roster ==
1983–84 Milwaukee Bucks roster
Players

Pos.	No.	Player	Height	Weight	DOB	From
G	7	Nate Archibald	6 ft 1 in (1.85 m)	150 lb (68 kg)		UTEP
C	45	Randy Breuer	7 ft 3 in (2.21 m)	230 lb (104 kg)		Minnesota
SF	2	Junior Bridgeman	6 ft 5 in (1.96 m)	210 lb (95 kg)		Louisville
PF	42	Harvey Catchings	6 ft 9 in (2.06 m)	218 lb (99 kg)		Hardin–Simmons
G	10	Mike Dunleavy	6 ft 3 in (1.91 m)	180 lb (82 kg)		South Carolina
F	35	Kevin Grevey	6 ft 5 in (1.96 m)	210 lb (95 kg)		Kentucky
SF	8	Marques Johnson	6 ft 7 in (2.01 m)	218 lb (99 kg)		UCLA
C	16	Bob Lanier	6 ft 11 in (2.11 m)	250 lb (113 kg)		St. Bonaventure
C	53	Alton Lister	7 ft 0 in (2.13 m)	240 lb (109 kg)		Arizona State
C	44	Paul Mokeski	7 ft 0 in (2.13 m)	250 lb (113 kg)		Kansas
SG	4	Sidney Moncrief	6 ft 3 in (1.91 m)	180 lb (82 kg)		Arkansas
G	25	Paul Pressey	6 ft 5 in (1.96 m)	185 lb (84 kg)		Tulsa
G	5	Lorenzo Romar	6 ft 1 in (1.85 m)	175 lb (79 kg)		Washington

Coaches
Head coach
- Don Nelson
Assistant(s)
- Mike Schuler
- Garry St. Jean

Legend
- (DP) Unsigned draft pick
- (FA) Free agent
- (S) Suspended
- Injured

== Regular season ==
=== Season standings ===
Central Division	W	L	PCT	GB	Home	Road	Div
y-Milwaukee Bucks	50	32	.610	–	30–11	20–21	19–10
x-Detroit Pistons	49	33	.598	1	30–11	19–22	21–8
x-Atlanta Hawks	40	42	.488	10	31–10	9–32	16–14
Cleveland Cavaliers	28	54	.341	22	23–18	5–36	11–19
Chicago Bulls	27	55	.329	23	18–23	9–32	10–20
Indiana Pacers	26	56	.317	24	20–21	6–35	12–18

#	Eastern Conference				
#	Team	W	L	PCT	GB
1	z-Boston Celtics	62	20	.756	–
2	y-Milwaukee Bucks	50	32	.610	12
3	x-Philadelphia 76ers	52	30	.634	10
4	x-Detroit Pistons	49	33	.598	13
5	x-New York Knicks	47	35	.573	15
6	x-New Jersey Nets	45	37	.549	17
7	x-Atlanta Hawks	40	42	.488	22
8	x-Washington Bullets	35	47	.427	27
9	Cleveland Cavaliers	28	54	.341	34
10	Chicago Bulls	27	55	.329	35
11	Indiana Pacers	26	56	.317	36

z – clinched division title
y – clinched division title
x – clinched playoff spot

=== Game log ===
1983–84 game log
Total: 50–32 (home: 30–11; road: 20–21)
October: 1–0 (home: 1–0; road: 0–0)

Game	Date	Team	Score	High points	High rebounds	High assists	Location Attendance	Record
1	October 28, 1983	Indiana	W 104–83				MECCA Arena	1–0

November: 10–6 (home: 6–0; road: 4–6)

Game	Date	Team	Score	High points	High rebounds	High assists	Location Attendance	Record
2	November 1, 1983	@ Detroit	L 93–106				Pontiac Silverdome	1–1
3	November 2, 1983	@ Boston	L 105–119				Boston Garden	1–2
4	November 4, 1983	@ Philadelphia	W 104–94				The Spectrum	2–2
5	November 6, 1983	Atlanta	W 97–84				MECCA Arena	3–2
6	November 8, 1983	@ New York	W 97–90				Madison Square Garden	4–2
7	November 9, 1983	Kansas City	W 95–93				MECCA Arena	5–2
8	November 11, 1983	@ New Jersey	L 103–107				Brendan Byrne Arena	5–3
9	November 13, 1983	Seattle	W 108–107				MECCA Arena	6–3
10	November 15, 1983	@ Los Angeles	L 97–126				The Forum	6–4
11	November 17, 1983	@ San Diego	L 122–141				San Diego Sports Arena	6–5
12	November 18, 1983	@ Phoenix	W 109–94				Arizona Veterans Memorial Coliseum	7–5
13	November 19, 1983	@ Denver	L 126–133				McNichols Sports Arena	7–6
14	November 23, 1983	Golden State	W 118–94				MECCA Arena	8–6
15	November 26, 1983	Washington	W 109–92				MECCA Arena	9–6
16	November 29, 1983	@ Washington	W 94–88				Capital Centre	10–6
17	November 30, 1983	Denver	W 139–122				MECCA Arena	11–6

December: 7–6 (home: 4–2; road: 3–4)

Game	Date	Team	Score	High points	High rebounds	High assists	Location Attendance	Record
18	December 2, 1983	New Jersey	W 122–107				MECCA Arena	12–6
19	December 7, 1983	Houston	W 103–101				MECCA Arena	13–6
20	December 9, 1983	@ Cleveland	W 96–83				Richfield Coliseum	14–6
21	December 11, 1983	Philadelphia	L 87–97				MECCA Arena	14–7
22	December 13, 1983	@ Chicago	L 88–96				Chicago Stadium	14–8
23	December 14, 1983	@ Philadelphia	L 93–115				The Spectrum	14–9
24	December 16, 1983	Dallas	W 110–105				MECCA Arena	15–9
25	December 17, 1983	@ New York	L 96–102				Madison Square Garden	15–10
26	December 22, 1983	Chicago	L 99–116				MECCA Arena	15–11
27	December 23, 1983	@ Cleveland	W 89–83				Richfield Coliseum	16–11
28	December 27, 1983	@ Indiana	L 104–115				Market Square Arena	16–12
29	December 28, 1983	@ New Jersey	W 89–85				Brendan Byrne Arena	17–12
30	December 30, 1983	Portland	W 93–88				MECCA Arena	18–12

January: 7–7 (home: 5–3; road: 2–4)

Game	Date	Team	Score	High points	High rebounds	High assists	Location Attendance	Record
31	January 3, 1984	Cleveland	W 104–92				MECCA Arena	19–12
32	January 5, 1984	Philadelphia	L 102–103 (OT)				MECCA Arena	19–13
33	January 6, 1984	@ Atlanta	L 87–91				The Omni	19–14
34	January 8, 1984	Detroit	L 100–111				MECCA Arena	19–15
35	January 10, 1984	Cleveland	L 104–116				MECCA Arena	19–16
36	January 13, 1984	New York	W 103–101				MECCA Arena	20–16
37	January 15, 1984	Boston	W 106–87				MECCA Arena	21–16
38	January 17, 1984	@ Indiana	W 112–92				Market Square Arena	22–16
39	January 18, 1984	Atlanta	W 99–90				MECCA Arena	23–16
40	January 20, 1984	Washington	W 133–103				MECCA Arena	24–16
41	January 22, 1984	@ Boston	L 98–109				Boston Garden	24–17
42	January 24, 1984	@ Washington	L 117–123 (2OT)				Capital Centre	24–18
43	January 25, 1984	@ Atlanta	L 105–109				The Omni	24–19
All-Star Break
44	January 31, 1984	@ Golden State	W 123–119 (OT)				Oakland–Alameda County Coliseum Arena	25–19

February: 10–5 (home: 5–1; road: 5–4)

Game	Date	Team	Score	High points	High rebounds	High assists	Location Attendance	Record
45	February 1, 1984	@ Seattle	L 98–99				Kingdome	25–20
46	February 3, 1984	@ Portland	L 110–116				Memorial Coliseum	25–21
47	February 4, 1984	@ Utah	L 102–116				Salt Palace Acord Arena	25–22
48	February 7, 1984	@ Kansas City	W 112–110 (OT)				Kemper Arena	26–22
49	February 8, 1984	New York	W 113–103				MECCA Arena	27–22
50	February 10, 1984	San Antonio	L 127–132				MECCA Arena	27–23
51	February 12, 1984	San Diego	W 107–100 (OT)				MECCA Arena	28–23
52	February 14, 1984	Phoenix	W 92–83				MECCA Arena	29–23
53	February 15, 1984	@ Indiana	W 107–91				Market Square Arena	30–23
54	February 17, 1984	Utah	W 105–91				MECCA Arena	31–23
55	February 19, 1984	@ Chicago	W 119–109				Chicago Stadium	32–23
56	February 21, 1984	@ Houston	L 102–119				The Summit	32–24
57	February 24, 1984	@ Dallas	W 95–88				Reunion Arena	33–24
58	February 25, 1984	@ San Antonio	W 130–119				HemisFair Arena	34–24
59	February 29, 1984	Chicago	W 112–83				MECCA Arena	35–24

March: 9–7 (home: 5–4; road: 4–3)

Game	Date	Team	Score	High points	High rebounds	High assists	Location Attendance	Record
60	March 2, 1984	@ Washington	W 98–78				Capital Centre	36–24
61	March 3, 1984	@ New York	W 111–106				Madison Square Garden	37–24
62	March 6, 1984	@ Atlanta	W 109–104 (OT)				The Omni	38–24
63	March 7, 1984	New Jersey	L 100–106				MECCA Arena	38–25
64	March 9, 1984	Boston	L 128–129 (2OT)				MECCA Arena	38–26
65	March 11, 1984	Atlanta	L 94–108				MECCA Arena	38–27
66	March 13, 1984	Detroit	W 116–95				MECCA Arena	39–27
67	March 14, 1984	@ Philadelphia	L 91–92				The Spectrum	39–28
68	March 16, 1984	@ Boston	L 99–109				Boston Garden	39–29
69	March 18, 1984	Washington	W 109–101				MECCA Arena	40–29
70	March 20, 1984	Los Angeles	L 94–99				MECCA Arena	40–30
71	March 21, 1984	@ New Jersey	W 102–95				Brendan Byrne Arena	41–30
72	March 24, 1984	Indiana	W 106–92				MECCA Arena	42–30
73	March 28, 1984	Cleveland	W 130–98				MECCA Arena	43–30
74	March 30, 1984	Chicago	W 119–86				MECCA Arena	44–30
75	March 31, 1984	@ Detroit	L 105–107				Pontiac Silverdome	44–31

April: 5–2 (home: 3–2; road: 2–0)

Game	Date	Team	Score	High points	High rebounds	High assists	Location Attendance	Record
76	April 3, 1984	New Jersey	W 109–92				MECCA Arena	45–31
77	April 5, 1984	Philadelphia	W 113–103				MECCA Arena	46–31
78	April 7, 1984	Detroit	W 110–92				MECCA Arena	47–31
79	April 10, 1984	Boston	L 95–96				MECCA Arena	47–32
80	April 11, 1984	@ Cleveland	W 108–95				Richfield Coliseum	48–32
81	April 13, 1984	@ Chicago	W 109–85				Chicago Stadium	49–32
82	April 14, 1984	Indiana	W 104–92				MECCA Arena	50–32

1983–84 schedule

== Playoffs ==
1984 playoff game log
Eastern Conference First Round: 3–2 (home: 3–0; road: 0–2)

Game	Date	Team	Score	High points	High rebounds	High assists	Location Attendance	Series
1	April 17, 1984	Atlanta	W 105–89	Sidney Moncrief (19)	Paul Mokeski (9)	Sidney Moncrief (6)	MECCA Arena; 10,107	1–0
2	April 19, 1984	Atlanta	W 101–87	Marques Johnson (27)	Alton Lister (10)	Sidney Moncrief (7)	MECCA Arena; 11,052	2–0
3	April 21, 1984	@ Atlanta	L 94–103	Marques Johnson (28)	Johnson, Lanier (10)	three players tied (3)	The Omni; 5,395	2–1
4	April 24, 1984	@ Atlanta	L 97–100	Junior Bridgeman (20)	Sidney Moncrief (13)	Mike Dunleavy (6)	The Omni; 6,435	2–2
5	April 26, 1984	Atlanta	W 118–89	Sidney Moncrief (20)	Bob Lanier (11)	Sidney Moncrief (8)	MECCA Arena; 11,052	3–2

Eastern Conference Semifinals: 4–2 (home: 2–1; road: 2–1)

Game	Date	Team	Score	High points	High rebounds	High assists	Location Attendance	Series
1	April 29, 1984	New Jersey	L 100–106	Marques Johnson (23)	Bob Lanier (10)	Marques Johnson (8)	MECCA Arena; 11,052	0–1
2	May 1, 1984	New Jersey	W 98–94	Sidney Moncrief (28)	Sidney Moncrief (8)	Johnson, Pressey (5)	MECCA Arena; 11,052	1–1
3	May 3, 1984	@ New Jersey	W 100–93	Sidney Moncrief (27)	Alton Lister (12)	Moncrief, Johnson (4)	Brendan Byrne Arena; 15,868	2–1
4	May 5, 1984	@ New Jersey	L 99–106	Sidney Moncrief (26)	Sidney Moncrief (9)	Bob Lanier (7)	Brendan Byrne Arena; 14,623	2–2
5	May 8, 1984	New Jersey	W 94–82	Marques Johnson (22)	Lister, Lanier (10)	Paul Pressey (7)	MECCA Arena; 11,052	3–2
6	May 10, 1984	@ New Jersey	W 98–97	Marques Johnson (25)	Marques Johnson (23)	Sidney Moncrief (7)	Brendan Byrne Arena; 15,283	4–2

Eastern Conference Finals: 1–4 (home: 1–1; road: 0–3)

Game	Date	Team	Score	High points	High rebounds	High assists	Location Attendance	Series
1	May 15, 1984	@ Boston	L 96–119	Marques Johnson (18)	Bob Lanier (11)	Marques Johnson (4)	Boston Garden; 14,890	0–1
2	May 17, 1984	@ Boston	L 110–125	Marques Johnson (29)	Sidney Moncrief (7)	three players tied (4)	Boston Garden; 14,890	0–2
3	May 19, 1984	Boston	L 100–109	Sidney Moncrief (22)	Paul Mokeski (12)	Sidney Moncrief (6)	MECCA Arena; 11,052	0–3
4	May 21, 1984	Boston	W 122–113	Paul Pressey (22)	Mokeski, Lister (9)	Bob Lanier (8)	MECCA Arena; 11,052	1–3
5	May 23, 1984	@ Boston	L 108–115	Marques Johnson (24)	Moncrief, Lister (8)	Paul Pressey (4)	Boston Garden; 14,890	1–4

1984 schedule

== Player statistics ==
Legend
GP	Games played	GS	Games started	MPG	Minutes per game
FG%	Field-goal percentage	3P%	3-point field-goal percentage	FT%	Free-throw percentage
RPG	Rebounds per game	APG	Assists per game	SPG	Steals per game
BPG	Blocks per game	PPG	Points per game

Player statistics source:

=== Season ===
Player	GP	GS	MPG	FG%	3FG%	FT%	RPG	APG	SPG	BPG	PPG
Sidney Moncrief	79	79	38.9	49.8	27.8	84.8	6.7	4.5	1.4	0.3	20.9
Marques Johnson	74	74	36.7	50.2	15.4	70.9	6.5	4.3	1.6	0.6	20.7
Junior Bridgeman	81	10	30.0	46.5	19.4	80.7	4.1	3.3	0.7	0.2	15.1
Bob Lanier	72	72	27.9	57.2	0.0	70.8	6.3	2.6	0.8	0.7	13.6
Mike Dunleavy	17	12	23.8	55.1	42.2	80.0	1.6	4.6	0.7	0.1	11.2
Paul Pressey	81	18	21.4	52.3	22.2	60.0	3.5	3.1	1.1	0.6	8.3
Alton Lister	82	72	23.8	50.0	0.0	62.6	7.4	1.3	0.5	1.7	7.6
Tiny Archibald	46	46	22.6	48.7	22.2	63.4	1.7	3.5	0.7	0.0	7.4
Kevin Grevey	64	3	14.4	45.1	28.3	89.3	1.3	1.2	0.4	0.1	7.0
Lorenzo Romar	65	9	15.5	46.0	12.5	72.2	1.4	3.0	0.8	0.1	6.0
Charlie Criss	6	0	17.8	36.7	16.7	63.6	1.5	2.8	0.8	0.0	5.0
Paul Mokeski	68	4	12.3	47.9	33.3	69.4	2.4	0.6	0.2	0.4	3.8
Randy Breuer	57	8	8.3	38.4	0.0	69.6	1.9	0.3	0.2	0.7	2.9
Harvey Catchings	69	3	16.8	39.9	0.0	52.4	3.9	0.6	0.4	1.2	2.1
Rory White	8	0	5.6	41.2	0.0	40.0	1.0	0.1	0.3	0.1	2.0
Linton Townes	2	0	1.0	100.0	0.0	0.0	0.0	0.0	0.0	0.0	1.0

=== Playoffs ===
Player	GP	GS	MPG	FG%	3FG%	FT%	RPG	APG	SPG	BPG	PPG
Marques Johnson	16		37.8	47.3	25.0	72.2	5.3	3.4	1.1	0.4	20.3
Sidney Moncrief	16		38.6	51.8	25.0	79.1	6.9	4.3	1.8	0.6	19.1
Junior Bridgeman	16		31.2	45.6	11.1	81.5	4.0	2.8	0.4	0.3	14.4
Bob Lanier	16		31.2	48.0	0.0	88.6	7.3	3.4	0.7	0.6	12.7
Mike Dunleavy	15		26.2	45.7	36.0	91.7	2.3	3.1	1.1	0.0	11.3
Paul Pressey	16		21.9	52.0	0.0	67.9	3.7	3.1	1.4	0.6	8.9
Alton Lister	16		23.0	50.0	0.0	62.5	6.0	0.6	0.3	1.5	6.8
Paul Mokeski	16		20.1	54.0	0.0	66.7	5.5	0.4	0.6	0.7	6.1
Randy Breuer	12		5.5	42.3	0.0	60.0	1.4	0.3	0.0	0.5	2.1
Lorenzo Romar	13		5.2	45.0	0.0	63.6	0.2	1.2	0.0	0.0	1.9
Kevin Grevey	5		5.4	22.2	0.0	66.7	0.4	0.2	0.0	0.0	1.6
Harvey Catchings	5		5.0	50.0	0.0	50.0	1.0	0.2	0.0	0.0	0.6

== Awards and records ==
- Sidney Moncrief, NBA Defensive Player of the Year Award
- Sidney Moncrief, All-NBA Second Team
- Sidney Moncrief, NBA All-Defensive First Team

== Transactions ==
=== Trades ===
September 30, 1983
To Milwaukee Bucks----
- Kevin Grevey
To Washington Bullets----
- 2nd round draft pick (Fred Raynolds)

=== Free agents ===
Player	Signed	Former team
Tiny Archibald	August 1, 1983	Boston Celtics
Lorenzo Romar	November 23, 1983	Golden State Warriors

== See also ==
- 1983–84 NBA season
