= 1983–84 New Jersey Nets season =

NBA professional basketball team season

- Head coach: Stan Albeck
- Arena: Brendan Byrne Arena

Results
- Record: 45–37 (.549)
- Place: Division: 4th (Atlantic); Conference: 6th (Eastern)
- Playoff finish: Conference semifinals (lost to Bucks 2–4)
- Stats at Basketball Reference

The 1983–84 New Jersey Nets season was the Nets' eighth season in the NBA, and saw the franchise win its first NBA playoff series, although this would remain the Nets' only playoff series win until 2002.

== Draft picks ==
Round	Pick	Player	Position	Nationality	College
2	44	Horace Owens		United States	Rhode Island
3	59	Bruce Kuczenski	PF/C	United States	Connecticut
4	87	Barney Mines		United States	Bradley
5	110	Tyren Naulls		United States	Texas A&M
6	133	Oscar Taylor		United States	New Orleans
7	156	Keith Bennett		United States	Sacred Heart
8	179	Joe Myers		United States	Duquesne
9	201	Kevin Black		United States	Rutgers
10	222	Rich Simkus		United States	Princeton

== Roster ==
1983–84 New Jersey Nets roster
Players

Pos.	No.	Player	Height	Weight	DOB	From
SG	10	Otis Birdsong	6 ft 3 in (1.91 m)	190 lb (86 kg)	1955-12-09	Houston
PG	12	Darwin Cook	6 ft 3 in (1.91 m)	184 lb (83 kg)	1958-08-06	Portland
C	53	Darryl Dawkins	6 ft 11 in (2.11 m)	251 lb (114 kg)	1957-01-11	Maynard Evans HS (FL)
C	42	Mike Gminski	6 ft 11 in (2.11 m)	250 lb (113 kg)	1959-08-03	Duke
F	33	Reggie Johnson	6 ft 9 in (2.06 m)	205 lb (93 kg)	1957-06-25	Tennessee
SF	55	Albert King	6 ft 6 in (1.98 m)	190 lb (86 kg)	1959-12-17	Maryland
SF	31	Mike O'Koren	6 ft 7 in (2.01 m)	207 lb (94 kg)	1958-02-07	North Carolina
PG	14	Kelvin Ransey	6 ft 1 in (1.85 m)	170 lb (77 kg)	1958-05-03	Ohio State
PG	20	Micheal Ray Richardson	6 ft 5 in (1.96 m)	189 lb (86 kg)	1955-04-11	Montana
PG	1	Foots Walker	6 ft 0 in (1.83 m)	184 lb (83 kg)	1951-05-21	West Georgia
PF	52	Buck Williams	6 ft 8 in (2.03 m)	215 lb (98 kg)	1954-10-14	Maryland
SF	34	Bill Willoughby	6 ft 8 in (2.03 m)	205 lb (93 kg)	1957-05-20	Dwight Morrow HS (NJ)

Coaches
Head coach
- Stan Albeck
Assistant(s)
- Bill Blair
- John Killilea
- Herman Kull
- Mike Schuler

Legend
- (DP) Unsigned draft pick
- (FA) Free agent
- (S) Suspended
- Injured

Roster

== Regular season ==
=== Season standings ===
Atlantic Division	W	L	PCT	GB	Home	Road	Div
y-Boston Celtics	62	20	.756	–	33–8	29–12	13–11
x-Philadelphia 76ers	52	30	.634	10	32–9	20–21	15–9
x-New York Knicks	47	35	.573	15	29–12	18–23	12–12
x-New Jersey Nets	45	37	.549	17	29–12	16–25	12–12
x-Washington Bullets	35	47	.427	27	25–16	10–31	8–16

#	Eastern Conference				
#	Team	W	L	PCT	GB
1	z-Boston Celtics	62	20	.756	–
2	y-Milwaukee Bucks	50	32	.610	12
3	x-Philadelphia 76ers	52	30	.634	10
4	x-Detroit Pistons	49	33	.598	13
5	x-New York Knicks	47	35	.573	15
6	x-New Jersey Nets	45	37	.549	17
7	x-Atlanta Hawks	40	42	.488	22
8	x-Washington Bullets	35	47	.427	27
9	Cleveland Cavaliers	28	54	.341	34
10	Chicago Bulls	27	55	.329	35
11	Indiana Pacers	26	56	.317	36

z – clinched division title
y – clinched division title
x – clinched playoff spot

== Game log ==
=== Regular season ===
1983–84 game log
Total: 45–37 (home: 29–12; road: 16–25)
October: 1–1 (home: 1–0; road: 0–1)

Game	Date	Team	Score	High points	High rebounds	High assists	Location Attendance	Record

November: 7–6 (home: 4–2; road: 3–4)

Game	Date	Team	Score	High points	High rebounds	High assists	Location Attendance	Record
7	November 11, 1983	Milwaukee	W 107–103				Brendan Byrne Arena	5–2
10	November 17, 1983	@ Dallas	L 113–115				Reunion Arena	6–4
12	November 23, 1983	@ Phoenix	W 110–108				Arizona Veterans Memorial Coliseum	7–5
13	November 25, 1983	@ Los Angeles	L 123–147				The Forum	7–6
15	November 30, 1983	New York	L 104–113				Brendan Byrne Arena	8–7

December: 6–10 (home: 4–2; road: 2–8)

Game	Date	Team	Score	High points	High rebounds	High assists	Location Attendance	Record
16	December 2, 1983	@ Milwaukee	L 107–122				MECCA Arena	8–8
26	December 22, 1983	Dallas	W 101–98				Brendan Byrne Arena	13–13
27	December 23, 1983	@ Boston	L 113–125				Boston Garden	13–14
28	December 25, 1983	@ New York	L 110–112 (OT)				Madison Square Garden	13–15
30	December 28, 1983	Milwaukee	L 85–89				Brendan Byrne Arena	13–17

January: 8–5 (home: 4–2; road: 4–3)

Game	Date	Team	Score	High points	High rebounds	High assists	Location Attendance	Record
32	January 3, 1984	Boston	L 103–105				Brendan Byrne Arena	14–18
40	January 17, 1984	@ New York	W 121–115				Madison Square Garden	20–20
44	January 26, 1984	@ Utah	L 115–125				Salt Palace Acord Arena	22–22
All-Star Break

February: 8–7 (home: 7–3; road: 1–4)

Game	Date	Team	Score	High points	High rebounds	High assists	Location Attendance	Record
48	February 6, 1984	Boston	W 115–112				Brendan Byrne Arena	25–23
55	February 18, 1984	@ New York	L 102–112				Madison Square Garden	26–29
58	February 25, 1984	New York	W 117–104				Brendan Byrne Arena	29–29
59	February 29, 1984	Los Angeles	W 102–92				Brendan Byrne Arena	30–29

March: 10–5 (home: 6–2; road: 4–3)

Game	Date	Team	Score	High points	High rebounds	High assists	Location Attendance	Record
61	March 5, 1984	Utah	W 120–116				Brendan Byrne Arena	32–29
62	March 7, 1984	@ Milwaukee	W 106–100				MECCA Arena	33–29
65	March 14, 1984	Phoenix	W 108–102				Brendan Byrne Arena	35–30
69	March 21, 1984	Milwaukee	L 95–102				Brendan Byrne Arena	37–32
70	March 23, 1984	@ Boston	W 101–97				Boston Garden	38–32
71	March 25, 1984	New York	W 107–94				Brendan Byrne Arena	39–32
74	March 31, 1984	Boston	L 98–107				Brendan Byrne Arena	40–34

April: 5–3 (home: 3–1; road: 2–2)

Game	Date	Team	Score	High points	High rebounds	High assists	Location Attendance	Record
75	April 3, 1984	@ Milwaukee	L 92–109				MECCA Arena	40–35
82	April 15, 1984	@ Boston	L 111–118				Boston Garden	45–37

1983–84 schedule

=== Playoffs ===
1984 playoff game log
Eastern Conference First Round: 3–2 (home: 0–2; road: 3–0)

Game	Date	Team	Score	High points	High rebounds	High assists	Location Attendance	Series
1	April 18	@ Philadelphia	W 116–101	Buck Williams (25)	Buck Williams (16)	Micheal Ray Richardson (9)	Spectrum; 12,511	1–0
2	April 20	@ Philadelphia	W 116–102	Micheal Ray Richardson (32)	Buck Williams (9)	Micheal Ray Richardson (9)	Spectrum; 14,025	2–0
3	April 22	Philadelphia	L 100–108	Buck Williams (21)	Buck Williams (17)	Micheal Ray Richardson (11)	Brendan Byrne Arena; 12,399	2–1
4	April 24	Philadelphia	L 102–110	Albert King (20)	Buck Williams (18)	Micheal Ray Richardson (9)	Brendan Byrne Arena; 20,149	2–2
5	April 26	@ Philadelphia	W 101–98	Richardson, Birdsong (24)	Buck Williams (16)	Richardson, Birdsong (6)	Spectrum; 17,921	3–2

Eastern Conference semifinals: 2–4 (home: 1–2; road: 1–2)

Game	Date	Team	Score	High points	High rebounds	High assists	Location Attendance	Series
1	April 29, 1984	@ Milwaukee	W 106–100	Darryl Dawkins (32)	Buck Williams (17)	Micheal Ray Richardson (8)	MECCA Arena; 11,052	1–0
2	May 1, 1984	@ Milwaukee	L 94–98	Buck Williams (21)	Buck Williams (18)	Williams, Richardson (5)	MECCA Arena; 11,052	1–1
3	May 3, 1984	Milwaukee	L 93–100	Darryl Dawkins (31)	Buck Williams (14)	Richardson, Cook (6)	Brendan Byrne Arena; 15,868	1–2
4	May 5, 1984	Milwaukee	W 106–99	Micheal Ray Richardson (24)	Buck Williams (10)	Otis Birdsong (7)	Brendan Byrne Arena; 14,623	2–2
5	May 8, 1984	@ Milwaukee	L 82–94	Darryl Dawkins (20)	Williams, Dawkins (8)	Micheal Ray Richardson (6)	MECCA Arena; 11,052	2–3
6	May 10, 1984	Milwaukee	L 97–98	Darryl Dawkins (29)	Buck Williams (12)	Micheal Ray Richardson (9)	Brendan Byrne Arena; 15,283	2–4

1984 schedule

== See also ==
- 1983–84 NBA season
