= 1983–84 Atlanta Hawks season =

Season of National Basketball Association team the Atlanta Hawks

- Head coach: Mike Fratello
- Arena: The Omni

Results
- Record: 40–42 (.488)
- Place: Division: 3rd (Central); Conference: 7th (Eastern)
- Playoff finish: East First Round (Eliminated 2-3)
- Stats at Basketball Reference

Local media
- Television: WTBS; SuperStation WTBS
- Radio: WSB

The 1983–84 Atlanta Hawks season was the Hawks' 35th season in the NBA and 16th season in Atlanta.

== Draft picks ==
Round	Pick	Player	Position	Nationality	College
2	31	Doc Rivers	G	United States	Marquette
3	58	John Pinone	PF	United States	Villanova
4	81	Harry Kelly		United States	Texas Southern
5	104	Charles Jones		United States	Oklahoma
6	127	Tom Bethea		United States	Richmond
7	150	Lex Drum		United States	Alabama-Birmingham
8	173	George Thomas		United States	Georgia Tech
9	195	Wil Kotchery		United States	Rutgers
10	216	Ronnie Carr		United States	Western Carolina

== Roster ==
1983–84 Atlanta Hawks roster
Players

Pos.	No.	Player	Height	Weight	DOB	From
C	31	Rickey Brown	6 ft 10 in (2.08 m)	215 lb (98 kg)	August 20, 1958	Mississippi State
G	14	Charlie Criss	5 ft 8 in (1.73 m)	165 lb (75 kg)		New Mexico State
PG	16	Johnny Davis	6 ft 2 in (1.88 m)	170 lb (77 kg)	October 21, 1955	Dayton
SG	34	Mike Glenn	6 ft 2 in (1.88 m)	175 lb (79 kg)	September 10, 1955	Southern Illinois
PF	44	Scott Hastings	6 ft 10 in (2.08 m)	235 lb (107 kg)		Arkansas
G	3	Eddie Johnson	6 ft 2 in (1.88 m)	180 lb (82 kg)		Auburn
F	53	Mark Landsberger	6 ft 8 in (2.03 m)	215 lb (98 kg)		Arizona State
F/C	5	Billy Paultz	6 ft 11 in (2.11 m)	235 lb (107 kg)	––	St. John's
PG	25	Doc Rivers	6 ft 4 in (1.93 m)	185 lb (84 kg)		Marquette
C	30	Tree Rollins	7 ft 1 in (2.16 m)	235 lb (107 kg)		Clemson
F	32	Dan Roundfield	6 ft 8 in (2.03 m)	205 lb (93 kg)		Central Michigan
SF	21	Dominique Wilkins	6 ft 7 in (2.01 m)	200 lb (91 kg)		Georgia
SF	35	Sly Williams	6 ft 7 in (2.01 m)	210 lb (95 kg)	January 26, 1958	Rhode Island
SG	10	Randy Wittman	6 ft 6 in (1.98 m)	210 lb (95 kg)	October 28, 1959	Indiana

Coaches
Head coach
- Mike Fratello

Legend
- (DP) Unsigned draft pick
- (FA) Free agent
- (S) Suspended
- Injured

== Regular season ==
=== Season standings ===
Central Division	W	L	PCT	GB	Home	Road	Div
y-Milwaukee Bucks	50	32	.610	–	30–11	20–21	19–10
x-Detroit Pistons	49	33	.598	1	30–11	19–22	21–8
x-Atlanta Hawks	40	42	.488	10	31–10	9–32	16–14
Cleveland Cavaliers	28	54	.341	22	23–18	5–36	11–19
Chicago Bulls	27	55	.329	23	18–23	9–32	10–20
Indiana Pacers	26	56	.317	24	20–21	6–35	12–18

#	Eastern Conference				
#	Team	W	L	PCT	GB
1	z-Boston Celtics	62	20	.756	–
2	y-Milwaukee Bucks	50	32	.610	12
3	x-Philadelphia 76ers	52	30	.634	10
4	x-Detroit Pistons	49	33	.598	13
5	x-New York Knicks	47	35	.573	15
6	x-New Jersey Nets	45	37	.549	17
7	x-Atlanta Hawks	40	42	.488	22
8	x-Washington Bullets	35	47	.427	27
9	Cleveland Cavaliers	28	54	.341	34
10	Chicago Bulls	27	55	.329	35
11	Indiana Pacers	26	56	.317	36

z - clinched division title
y - clinched division title
x - clinched playoff spot

== Game log ==
=== Regular season ===
1983–84 game log
Total: 40–42 (Home: 31–10; Road: 9–32)
October: 1–1 (home: 1–0; road: 0–1)

Game	Date	Team	Score	High points	High rebounds	High assists	Location Attendance	Record

November: 7–7 (home: 7–1; road: 0–6)

Game	Date	Team	Score	High points	High rebounds	High assists	Location Attendance	Record
5	November 6	@ Milwaukee						
13	November 25	@ Boston						

December: 8–7 (home: 7–2; road: 1–5)

Game	Date	Team	Score	High points	High rebounds	High assists	Location Attendance	Record
19	December 6	Phoenix						
22	December 10	Boston						
27	December 21	@ Boston						

January: 8–6 (home: 5–1; road: 3–5)

Game	Date	Team	Score	High points	High rebounds	High assists	Location Attendance	Record
34	January 6	Milwaukee						
40	January 18	@ Milwaukee						
44	January 25	Milwaukee						

February: 7–8 (home: 6–1; road: 1–7)

Game	Date	Team	Score	High points	High rebounds	High assists	Location Attendance	Record
50	February 9	@ Phoenix						
52	February 12	@ Los Angeles						

March: 4–12 (home: 2–5; road: 2–7)

Game	Date	Team	Score	High points	High rebounds	High assists	Location Attendance	Record
61	March 2	Los Angeles						
63	March 6	Milwaukee						
66	March 11	@ Milwaukee						
70	March 17	Boston						
75	March 30	@ Boston						

April: 5–1 (home: 3–0; road: 2–1)

Game	Date	Team	Score	High points	High rebounds	High assists	Location Attendance	Record

1983–84 schedule

=== Playoffs ===
1984 playoff game log
First Round: 2–3 (home: 2–0; road: 0–3)

Game	Date	Team	Score	High points	High rebounds	High assists	Location Attendance	Series
1	April 17	@ Milwaukee	L 89–105	Dan Roundfield (21)	Dan Roundfield (10)	Johnny Davis (7)	MECCA Arena; 10,107	0–1
2	April 19	@ Milwaukee	L 87–101	Dominique Wilkins (22)	Roundfield, Rollins (7)	Eddie Johnson (8)	MECCA Arena; 11,052	0–2
3	April 21	Milwaukee	W 103–94	Dan Roundfield (25)	Roundfield, Brown (7)	Eddie Johnson (7)	Omni Coliseum; 5,395	1–2
4	April 24	Milwaukee	W 100–97	Wilkins, Rivers (19)	Dan Roundfield (13)	Johnny Davis (6)	Omni Coliseum; 6,435	2–2
5	April 26	@ Milwaukee	L 89–118	Doc Rivers (21)	Dominique Wilkins (13)	Doc Rivers (6)	MECCA Arena; 11,052	2–3

1984 schedule

== Player statistics ==
Legend
GP	Games played	GS	Games started	MPG	Minutes per game
FG%	Field-goal percentage	3P%	3-point field-goal percentage	FT%	Free-throw percentage
RPG	Rebounds per game	APG	Assists per game	SPG	Steals per game
BPG	Blocks per game	PPG	Points per game

=== Season ===
Player	GP	GS	MPG	FG%	3FG%	FT%	RPG	APG	SPG	BPG	PPG
Dominique Wilkins	81	81	36.6	47.9	0.0	77.0	7.2	1.6	1.4	1.1	21.6
Dan Roundfield	73	72	35.8	48.5	0.0	77.0	9.9	2.5	0.8	1.0	18.9
Eddie Johnson	67	43	28.3	44.2	37.2	77.0	2.2	5.6	0.9	0.1	13.2
Johnny Davis	75	72	27.7	44.3	0.0	84.8	1.9	4.3	0.8	0.1	12.3
Doc Rivers	81	47	23.9	46.2	16.7	78.5	2.7	3.9	1.6	0.4	9.3
Tree Rollins	77	76	30.5	51.8	0.0	62.1	7.7	0.8	0.5	3.6	8.6
Mike Glenn	81	0	18.6	56.3	50.0	80.0	1.3	2.1	0.6	0.1	8.4
Wes Matthews	6	0	16.0	53.3	0.0	81.8	0.7	3.5	0.8	0.2	8.3
Sly Williams	13	1	19.8	29.8	11.1	78.3	3.8	1.2	1.1	0.1	8.1
Scott Hastings	68	8	16.7	46.8	25.0	78.8	4.0	0.7	0.6	0.5	4.5
Randy Wittman	78	1	13.7	50.3	40.0	60.9	0.9	0.9	0.2	0.0	4.5
Rickey Brown	68	3	11.5	46.8	0.0	73.8	2.7	0.4	0.3	0.3	3.5
Armond Hill	15	2	12.1	30.4	0.0	81.0	0.7	2.3	0.5	0.0	3.0
John Pinone	7	0	9.3	53.8	0.0	60.0	1.4	0.4	0.3	0.1	2.9
Charlie Criss	9	0	12.0	40.9	0.0	100.0	1.2	2.3	0.3	0.0	2.6
Billy Paultz	40	4	12.2	40.9	0.0	51.5	2.8	0.5	0.2	0.2	2.2
Mark Landsberger	35	0	9.6	37.3	0.0	57.7	3.4	0.3	0.2	0.1	1.5

=== Playoffs ===
Player	GP	GS	MPG	FG%	3FG%	FT%	RPG	APG	SPG	BPG	PPG
Dominique Wilkins	5		39.4	41.7	0.0	83.9	8.2	2.2	2.4	0.2	19.2
Dan Roundfield	5		38.2	43.5	100.0	71.4	8.8	1.6	0.4	1.4	17.2
Doc Rivers	5		26.0	50.0	0.0	87.8	2.0	3.2	2.4	0.8	13.6
Eddie Johnson	5		24.6	35.2	16.7	68.2	1.8	4.8	1.2	0.0	10.8
Johnny Davis	5		26.2	40.0	0.0	100.0	2.0	4.8	0.2	0.0	10.0
Randy Wittman	5		19.2	54.1	0.0	0.0	1.8	2.2	0.2	0.0	8.0
Rickey Brown	5		16.6	47.6	0.0	83.3	3.8	0.4	0.0	0.2	6.0
Tree Rollins	5		30.4	40.0	0.0	62.5	6.8	0.2	0.4	2.0	5.0
Mike Glenn	5		10.6	35.7	0.0	0.0	1.0	1.0	0.4	0.0	2.0
Scott Hastings	5		6.4	22.2	0.0	75.0	1.6	0.2	0.2	0.0	1.4
Billy Paultz	2		3.5	33.3	0.0	0.0	0.0	0.0	0.0	0.0	1.0
Mark Landsberger	2		2.5	0.0	0.0	0.0	0.5	0.0	0.0	0.0	0.0

Player statistics citation:

== Awards and records ==
- Wayne Rollins, NBA All-Defensive First Team
- Dan Roundfield, NBA All-Defensive Second Team

== See also ==
- 1983-84 NBA season
