= 1983–84 Indiana Pacers season =

NBA professional basketball team season

- Head coach: Jack McKinney
- Arena: Market Square Arena

Results
- Record: 26–56 (.317)
- Place: Division: 6th (Central); Conference: 11th (Eastern)
- Playoff finish: Did not qualify
- Stats at Basketball Reference

Local media
- Television: WTTV
- Radio: WNDE

The 1983–84 Indiana Pacers season was Indiana's eighth season in the NBA and 17th season as a franchise.

== Offseason ==
=== Draft picks ===
This table only lists picks through the second round.

Round	Pick	Player	Position	Nationality	College
1	2	Steve Stipanovich	C	United States	Missouri
1	23	Mitchell Wiggins	SG	United States	Florida State
2	26	Leroy Combs	SF	United States	Oklahoma State
2	40	Jim Thomas	G	United States	Indiana

== Roster ==
Indiana Pacers roster
Players

Pos.	No.	Player	Height	Weight	DOB	From
SG	12	Butch Carter	6 ft 5 in (1.96 m)	180 lb (82 kg)		Indiana
SF	34	Leroy Combs	6 ft 8 in (2.03 m)	210 lb (95 kg)		Oklahoma State
SF	24	George Johnson	6 ft 7 in (2.01 m)	210 lb (95 kg)		St. John's
PF	33	Clark Kellogg	6 ft 7 in (2.01 m)	225 lb (102 kg)		Ohio State
PG	35	Sidney Lowe	6 ft 0 in (1.83 m)	195 lb (88 kg)		NC State
SG	21	Kevin McKenna	6 ft 5 in (1.96 m)	195 lb (88 kg)		Creighton
PG	14	Jerry Sichting	6 ft 1 in (1.85 m)	168 lb (76 kg)		Purdue
SG	11	Brook Steppe	6 ft 5 in (1.96 m)	195 lb (88 kg)		Georgia Tech
C	40	Steve Stipanovich	6 ft 11 in (2.11 m)	245 lb (111 kg)		Missouri
SG	6	Jim Thomas	6 ft 3 in (1.91 m)	190 lb (86 kg)		Indiana
C	31	Granville Waiters	6 ft 11 in (2.11 m)	225 lb (102 kg)		Ohio State
C	32	Herb Williams	6 ft 10 in (2.08 m)	242 lb (110 kg)		Ohio State

Coaches
Head coach
- Jack McKinney
Assistant(s)
- Scotty Robertson

Legend
- (DP) Unsigned draft pick
- (FA) Free agent
- (S) Suspended
- Injured

== Regular season ==
=== Season standings ===
Central Division	W	L	PCT	GB	Home	Road	Div
y-Milwaukee Bucks	50	32	.610	–	30–11	20–21	19–10
x-Detroit Pistons	49	33	.598	1	30–11	19–22	21–8
x-Atlanta Hawks	40	42	.488	10	31–10	9–32	16–14
Cleveland Cavaliers	28	54	.341	22	23–18	5–36	11–19
Chicago Bulls	27	55	.329	23	18–23	9–32	10–20
Indiana Pacers	26	56	.317	24	20–21	6–35	12–18

#	Eastern Conference				
#	Team	W	L	PCT	GB
1	z-Boston Celtics	62	20	.756	–
2	y-Milwaukee Bucks	50	32	.610	12
3	x-Philadelphia 76ers	52	30	.634	10
4	x-Detroit Pistons	49	33	.598	13
5	x-New York Knicks	47	35	.573	15
6	x-New Jersey Nets	45	37	.549	17
7	x-Atlanta Hawks	40	42	.488	22
8	x-Washington Bullets	35	47	.427	27
9	Cleveland Cavaliers	28	54	.341	34
10	Chicago Bulls	27	55	.329	35
11	Indiana Pacers	26	56	.317	36

z - clinched division title
y - clinched division title
x - clinched playoff spot

== Player statistics ==
=== Regular season ===
Player	POS	GP	GS	MP	REB	AST	STL	BLK	PTS	MPG	RPG	APG	SPG	BPG	PPG
Steve Stipanovich	C	81	73	2,426	562	170	73	67	970	30.0	6.9	2.1	.9	.8	12.0
George L. Johnson	SF	81	20	2,073	460	195	82	49	1,056	25.6	5.7	2.4	1.0	.6	13.0
Jerry Sichting	PG	80	80	2,497	171	457	90	8	917	31.2	2.1	5.7	1.1	.1	11.5
Clark Kellogg	PF	79	79	2,676	719	234	121	28	1,506	33.9	9.1	3.0	1.5	.4	19.1
Granville Waiters	C	78	8	1,040	227	60	24	85	277	13.3	2.9	.8	.3	1.1	3.6
Sidney Lowe	PG	78	2	1,238	122	269	93	5	324	15.9	1.6	3.4	1.2	.1	4.2
Butch Carter	SG	73	54	2,045	153	206	128	13	977	28.0	2.1	2.8	1.8	.2	13.4
Jim Thomas	SG	72	15	1,219	149	130	60	6	455	16.9	2.1	1.8	.8	.1	6.3
Herb Williams	C	69	53	2,279	554	215	60	108	1,029	33.0	8.0	3.1	.9	1.6	14.9
Kevin McKenna	SG	61	13	923	95	114	46	5	387	15.1	1.6	1.9	.8	.1	6.3
Brook Steppe	SG	61	13	857	122	79	34	6	430	14.0	2.0	1.3	.6	.1	7.0
Leroy Combs	SF	48	0	446	56	38	23	18	218	9.3	1.2	.8	.5	.4	4.5
Bruce Kuczenski^{†}	PF	5	0	51	9	2	0	0	14	10.2	1.8	.4	.0	.0	2.8
Tracy Jackson	SG	2	0	10	1	0	0	0	6	5.0	.5	.0	.0	.0	3.0

- ^{†} Denotes player spent time with another team in the season. Stats reflect time with the Pacers only.

== Awards and records ==
- Steve Stipanovich, NBA All-Rookie Team 1st Team

== See also ==
- 1983-84 NBA season
