= 1983–84 Philadelphia 76ers season =

NBA professional basketball team season

- Head coach: Billy Cunningham
- General manager: Pat Williams
- Arena: The Spectrum

Results
- Record: 52–30 (.634)
- Place: Division: 2nd (Atlantic); Conference: 3rd (Eastern)
- Playoff finish: First round (lost to Nets 2–3)
- Stats at Basketball Reference

Local media
- Television: WPHL-TV; PRISM
- Radio: WIP

The 1983–84 Philadelphia 76ers season was the 76ers' 35th season in the NBA and 21st season in Philadelphia. The 76ers entered the season as the defending NBA Champions, having won their third NBA Championship the year prior, sweeping the Los Angeles Lakers in four games. The team would start fast posting 21 wins in their first 26 games but finished with a 52–30 record. The major difference was that they were just around .500 on the road for the year, unlike the previous season, where they won 30 regular season games away from Philadelphia. The 76ers would lose in the first round of the newly expanded playoff format to the New Jersey Nets, who had never won a playoff series in their NBA history to that point. The 76ers lost all three post season games at The Spectrum.

== Draft picks ==
Round	Pick	Player	Position	Nationality	College
1	17	Leo Rautins	SF	Canada	Syracuse
2	47	Ken Lyons	PF	United States	North Texas State
2	64	Claude Riley		United States	Texas A&M
3	70	Dan Ruland	C	United States	James Madison
3	74	Kalpatrick Wells		United States	Mississippi State
4	93	Craig Robinson	F	United States	Princeton
5	116	Mike Milligan		United States	Tennessee State
6	139	Sedale Threatt	PG	United States	West Virginia Tech
7	162	Tony Bruin		United States	Syracuse
8	184	Gordon Austin		United States	American
9	206	Charles Fisher		United States	James Madison

== Roster ==
Philadelphia 76ers roster
Players

Pos.	No.	Player	Height	Weight	DOB	From
PG	1	Wes Matthews	6 ft 1 in (1.85 m)	170 lb (77 kg)	1959–08–24	Wisconsin
C	2	Moses Malone	6 ft 11 in (2.11 m)	240 lb (109 kg)	1955–03–23	Petersburg High School
PG	3	Sedale Threatt	6 ft 2 in (1.88 m)	175 lb (79 kg)	1961–09–10	West Virginia Tech
SG	4	Clint Richardson	6 ft 3 in (1.91 m)	195 lb (88 kg)	1956–08–07	Seattle
SF	6	Julius Erving	6 ft 7 in (2.01 m)	210 lb (95 kg)	1950-02-22	UMass
PF	8	Marc Iavaroni	6 ft 8 in (2.03 m)	210 lb (95 kg)	1956-09-15	Virginia
PG	10	Maurice Cheeks	6 ft 1 in (1.85 m)	180 lb (82 kg)	1956–09–08	West Texas A&M
SF	11	Leo Rautins	6 ft 8 in (2.03 m)	215 lb (98 kg)	1960–03–20	Syracuse
PG	14	Franklin Edwards	6 ft 1 in (1.85 m)	170 lb (77 kg)	1959–02–02	Cleveland State
SG	22	Andrew Toney	6 ft 3 in (1.91 m)	178 lb (81 kg)	1957–11–23	Louisiana
PF	24	Bobby Jones	6 ft 9 in (2.06 m)	210 lb (95 kg)	1951–12–18	North Carolina
PF	33	Sam Williams	6 ft 8 in (2.03 m)	210 lb (95 kg)	1959-03-07	Arizona State
C	45	Clemon Johnson	6 ft 10 in (2.08 m)	240 lb (109 kg)	1956–09–12	Florida A&M

Coaches
Head coach
- Billy Cunningham
Assistant(s)
- Matt Guokas
- Jack McMahon

Legend
- (DP) Unsigned draft pick
- (FA) Free agent
- (S) Suspended
- Injured

== Regular season ==
=== Season standings ===
Atlantic Division	W	L	PCT	GB	Home	Road	Div
y-Boston Celtics	62	20	.756	–	33–8	29–12	13–11
x-Philadelphia 76ers	52	30	.634	10	32–9	20–21	15–9
x-New York Knicks	47	35	.573	15	29–12	18–23	12–12
x-New Jersey Nets	45	37	.549	17	29–12	16–25	12–12
x-Washington Bullets	35	47	.427	27	25–16	10–31	8–16

#	Eastern Conference				
#	Team	W	L	PCT	GB
1	z-Boston Celtics	62	20	.756	–
2	y-Milwaukee Bucks	50	32	.610	12
3	x-Philadelphia 76ers	52	30	.634	10
4	x-Detroit Pistons	49	33	.598	13
5	x-New York Knicks	47	35	.573	15
6	x-New Jersey Nets	45	37	.549	17
7	x-Atlanta Hawks	40	42	.488	22
8	x-Washington Bullets	35	47	.427	27
9	Cleveland Cavaliers	28	54	.341	34
10	Chicago Bulls	27	55	.329	35
11	Indiana Pacers	26	56	.317	36

z – clinched division title
y – clinched division title
x – clinched playoff spot

== Game log ==
=== Regular season ===
1983–84 game log
Total: 52–30 (home: 32–9; road: 20–21)
October: 2–0 (home: 1–0; road: 1–0)

Game	Date	Team	Score	High points	High rebounds	High assists	Location Attendance	Record

November: 11–3 (home: 7–1; road: 4–2)

Game	Date	Team	Score	High points	High rebounds	High assists	Location Attendance	Record
11	November 19	Boston	W 92–91				The Spectrum	8–3

December: 8–4 (home: 4–1; road: 4–3)

Game	Date	Team	Score	High points	High rebounds	High assists	Location Attendance	Record
18	December 4	@ Boston	W 121–114 (OT)				Boston Garden	14–4

January: 8–7 (home: 5–1; road: 3–6)

Game	Date	Team	Score	High points	High rebounds	High assists	Location Attendance	Record
36	January 13	Boston	L 104–105				The Spectrum	25–11
43	January 25	@ Boston	L 98–102				Boston Garden	29–14
All-Star Break

February: 6–9 (home: 4–4; road: 2–5)

Game	Date	Team	Score	High points	High rebounds	High assists	Location Attendance	Record
50	February 12	@ Boston	W 109–91				Boston Garden	32–18
57	February 26	Los Angeles	L 99–101				The Spectrum	34–23

March: 13–3 (home: 8–1; road: 5–2)

Game	Date	Team	Score	High points	High rebounds	High assists	Location Attendance	Record
61	March 7	@ Los Angeles	W 113–105				The Forum	37–24
70	March 25	Boston	W 119–114 (2OT)				The Spectrum	45–25

April: 4–4 (home: 3–1; road: 1–3)

Game	Date	Team	Score	High points	High rebounds	High assists	Location Attendance	Record

1983–84 schedule

=== Playoffs ===
1984 playoff game log
First Round: 2–3 (home: 0–3; road: 2–0)

Game	Date	Team	Score	High points	High rebounds	High assists	Location Attendance	Series
1	April 18	New Jersey	L 101–116	Andrew Toney (24)	Moses Malone (11)	Julius Erving (8)	Spectrum; 12,511	0–1
2	April 20	New Jersey	L 102–116	Moses Malone (25)	Moses Malone (12)	Toney, Richardson (4)	Spectrum; 14,025	0–2
3	April 22	@ New Jersey	W 108–100	Julius Erving (27)	Moses Malone (17)	Erving, Cheeks (5)	Brendan Byrne Arena; 12,399	1–2
4	April 24	@ New Jersey	W 110–102	Malone, Erving (22)	Moses Malone (15)	Julius Erving (8)	Brendan Byrne Arena; 20,149	2–2
5	April 26	New Jersey	L 98–101	Andrew Toney (22)	Moses Malone (14)	Maurice Cheeks (7)	Spectrum; 17,921	2–3

1984 schedule

== Player statistics ==
Legend
GP	Games played	GS	Games started	MPG	Minutes per game
FG%	Field-goal percentage	3P%	3-point field-goal percentage	FT%	Free-throw percentage
RPG	Rebounds per game	APG	Assists per game	SPG	Steals per game
BPG	Blocks per game	PPG	Points per game

== Awards and records ==
- Julius Erving, All-NBA Second Team
- Moses Malone, All-NBA Second Team
- Bobby Jones, NBA All-Defensive First Team
- Maurice Cheeks, NBA All-Defensive First Team

== See also ==
- 1983–84 NBA season
