= 1983–84 Chicago Bulls season =

NBA professional basketball team season

- Head coach: Kevin Loughery
- General manager: Rod Thorn
- Owner(s): Estate of Arthur Wirtz and Jonathan Kovler
- Arena: Chicago Stadium

Results
- Record: 27–55 (.329)
- Place: Division: 5th (Central); Conference: 10th (Eastern)
- Playoff finish: Did not qualify
- Stats at Basketball Reference

Local media
- Television: WGN-TV (Milo Hamilton, Johnny “Red” Kerr); Sportsvision (Bill Hazen, John Mengelt)
- Radio: WIND (Jim Durham, Dave Baum)

The 1983–84 Chicago Bulls season was the Chicago Bulls' 18th season in the NBA.

== Draft picks ==
Round	Pick	Player	Position	Nationality	School/Club team
1	5	Sidney Green	PF	United States	UNLV
2	25	Sidney Lowe	PG	United States	NC State
2	29	Larry Micheaux	PF	United States	Houston
4	75	Ron Crevier	C	Canada	Boston College
5	98	Tim Andree	?	United States	Notre Dame
6	121	Ernest Patterson	?	United States	New Mexico State
7	144	Jacque Hill	?	United States	Southern California
8	167	Terry Bradley	?	United States	Chicago State
9	189	Ray Orange	?	United States	Oklahoma Christian
10	210	Tom Emma	?	United States	Duke

== Roster ==
1983–84 Chicago Bulls roster
Players

Pos.	No.	Player	Height	Weight	DOB	From
C	40	Dave Corzine	6 ft 11 in (2.11 m)	250 lb (113 kg)	1956-04-25	DePaul
G	44	Quintin Dailey	6 ft 3 in (1.91 m)	180 lb (82 kg)	1961-01-22	San Francisco
F	21	Sidney Green	6 ft 9 in (2.06 m)	220 lb (100 kg)	1961-01-04	UNLV
F	34	David Greenwood	6 ft 9 in (2.06 m)	222 lb (101 kg)	1957-05-27	UCLA
F	22	Rod Higgins	6 ft 7 in (2.01 m)	200 lb (91 kg)	1960-01-31	Fresno State
C	32	Steve Johnson	6 ft 10 in (2.08 m)	235 lb (107 kg)	1957-11-03	Oregon State
G	12	Ronnie Lester	6 ft 2 in (1.88 m)	175 lb (79 kg)	1959-01-01	Iowa
C	33	Jawann Oldham	7 ft 0 in (2.13 m)	215 lb (98 kg)	1957-07-04	Seattle
G	3	Ennis Whatley	6 ft 3 in (1.91 m)	177 lb (80 kg)	1962-08-11	Alabama
F	0	Orlando Woolridge	6 ft 9 in (2.06 m)	215 lb (98 kg)	1959-12-16	Notre Dame

Coaches
Head coach
- Kevin Loughery
Assistant(s)
- Bill Blair
- Mike Thibault

Legend
- (DP) Unsigned draft pick
- (FA) Free agent
- (S) Suspended
- Injured

Roster
Updated: February 15, 1984

== Regular season ==
=== Season standings ===
Central Division	W	L	PCT	GB	Home	Road	Div
y-Milwaukee Bucks	50	32	.610	–	30–11	20–21	19–10
x-Detroit Pistons	49	33	.598	1	30–11	19–22	21–8
x-Atlanta Hawks	40	42	.488	10	31–10	9–32	16–14
Cleveland Cavaliers	28	54	.341	22	23–18	5–36	11–19
Chicago Bulls	27	55	.329	23	18–23	9–32	10–20
Indiana Pacers	26	56	.317	24	20–21	6–35	12–18

#	Eastern Conference				
#	Team	W	L	PCT	GB
1	z-Boston Celtics	62	20	.756	–
2	y-Milwaukee Bucks	50	32	.610	12
3	x-Philadelphia 76ers	52	30	.634	10
4	x-Detroit Pistons	49	33	.598	13
5	x-New York Knicks	47	35	.573	15
6	x-New Jersey Nets	45	37	.549	17
7	x-Atlanta Hawks	40	42	.488	22
8	x-Washington Bullets	35	47	.427	27
9	Cleveland Cavaliers	28	54	.341	34
10	Chicago Bulls	27	55	.329	35
11	Indiana Pacers	26	56	.317	36

z - clinched division title
y - clinched division title
x - clinched playoff spot

== Player statistics ==
Legend
GP	Games played	GS	Games started	MPG	Minutes per game
FG%	Field-goal percentage	3P%	3-point field-goal percentage	FT%	Free-throw percentage
RPG	Rebounds per game	APG	Assists per game	SPG	Steals per game
BPG	Blocks per game	PPG	Points per game

1983–84 Chicago Bulls roster
Players

Pos.	No.	Player	Height	Weight	DOB	From
C	40	Dave Corzine	6 ft 11 in (2.11 m)	250 lb (113 kg)	1956-04-25	DePaul
G	44	Quintin Dailey	6 ft 3 in (1.91 m)	180 lb (82 kg)	1961-01-22	San Francisco
F	21	Sidney Green	6 ft 9 in (2.06 m)	220 lb (100 kg)	1961-01-04	UNLV
F	34	David Greenwood	6 ft 9 in (2.06 m)	222 lb (101 kg)	1957-05-27	UCLA
F	22	Rod Higgins	6 ft 7 in (2.01 m)	200 lb (91 kg)	1960-01-31	Fresno State
C	32	Steve Johnson	6 ft 10 in (2.08 m)	235 lb (107 kg)	1957-11-03	Oregon State
G	12	Ronnie Lester	6 ft 2 in (1.88 m)	175 lb (79 kg)	1959-01-01	Iowa
C	33	Jawann Oldham	7 ft 0 in (2.13 m)	215 lb (98 kg)	1957-07-04	Seattle
G	3	Ennis Whatley	6 ft 3 in (1.91 m)	177 lb (80 kg)	1962-08-11	Alabama
F	0	Orlando Woolridge	6 ft 9 in (2.06 m)	215 lb (98 kg)	1959-12-16	Notre Dame

Coaches
Head coach
- Vacant

Legend
- (DP) Unsigned draft pick
- (FA) Free agent
- (S) Suspended
- Injured

== See also ==
- 1983-84 NBA season
