= 1983–84 Cleveland Cavaliers season =

NBA professional basketball team season

- Head coach: Tom Nissalke
- General manager: Harry Weltman
- Owners: Gordon Gund; George Gund III
- Arena: Richfield Coliseum

Results
- Record: 28–54 (.341)
- Place: Division: 4th (Central); Conference: 9th (Eastern)
- Playoff finish: Did not qualify
- Stats at Basketball Reference

Local media
- Television: WUAB
- Radio: WBBG

The 1983–84 Cleveland Cavaliers season was the 14th NBA basketball season in Cleveland, Ohio.

== Draft picks ==
| Round | Pick | Player | Nationality | School/Club team |
|---|---|---|---|---|
| 1 | 20 | Roy Hinson | C | Rutgers |
| 1 | 24 | Stewart Granger | PG | Villanova |
| 2 | 27 | John Garris | PF | Boston College |

== Roster ==
1983–84 Cleveland Cavaliers roster
Players

| Pos. | No. | Player | Height | Weight | DOB | From |
|---|---|---|---|---|---|---|
| PG | 5 | John Bagley | 6 ft 0 in (1.83 m) | 185 lb (84 kg) | 1960-04-23 | Boston College |
| C | 44 | Jeff Cook | 6 ft 10 in (2.08 m) | 215 lb (98 kg) | 1956-10-21 | Idaho State |
| C | 41 | Geoff Crompton | 6 ft 11 in (2.11 m) | 280 lb (127 kg) | 1955-07-04 | North Carolina |
| SG | 21 | World B. Free | 6 ft 2 in (1.88 m) | 185 lb (84 kg) | 1953-12-09 | Guilford |
| PF | 55 | John Garris | 6 ft 8 in (2.03 m) | 205 lb (93 kg) | 1959-06-06 | Boston College |
| PG | 10 | Stewart Granger | 6 ft 3 in (1.91 m) | 190 lb (86 kg) | 1961-10-27 | Villanova |
| SF | 35 | Phil Hubbard | 6 ft 8 in (2.03 m) | 215 lb (98 kg) | 1956-12-13 | Michigan |
| PG | 20 | Geoff Huston | 6 ft 2 in (1.88 m) | 175 lb (79 kg) | 1957-11-08 | Texas Tech |
| PF | 50 | Ben Poquette | 6 ft 9 in (2.06 m) | 235 lb (107 kg) | 1955-05-07 | Central Michigan |
| C | 11 | Cliff Robinson | 6 ft 9 in (2.06 m) | 220 lb (100 kg) | 1960-03-13 | USC |
| PF | 8 | Lonnie Shelton | 6 ft 8 in (2.03 m) | 240 lb (109 kg) | 1955-10-19 | Oregon State |
| SF | 36 | Paul Thompson | 6 ft 6 in (1.98 m) | 210 lb (95 kg) | 1961-05-25 | Tulane |

Coaches
Head coach
- Tom Nissalke
Assistant(s)
- Don Delaney
- Gene Littles

Legend
- (DP) Unsigned draft pick
- (FA) Free agent
- (S) Suspended
- Injured

Roster
Updated: March 30, 1983

== Regular season ==
=== Season standings ===
| Central Division | W | L | PCT | GB | Home | Road | Div |
|---|---|---|---|---|---|---|---|
| y-Milwaukee Bucks | 50 | 32 | .610 | – | 30–11 | 20–21 | 19–10 |
| x-Detroit Pistons | 49 | 33 | .598 | 1 | 30–11 | 19–22 | 21–8 |
| x-Atlanta Hawks | 40 | 42 | .488 | 10 | 31–10 | 9–32 | 16–14 |
| Cleveland Cavaliers | 28 | 54 | .341 | 22 | 23–18 | 5–36 | 11–19 |
| Chicago Bulls | 27 | 55 | .329 | 23 | 18–23 | 9–32 | 10–20 |
| Indiana Pacers | 26 | 56 | .317 | 24 | 20–21 | 6–35 | 12–18 |

| # | Eastern Conference | | | | |
| # | Team | W | L | PCT | GB |
|---|---|---|---|---|---|
| 1 | z-Boston Celtics | 62 | 20 | .756 | – |
| 2 | y-Milwaukee Bucks | 50 | 32 | .610 | 12 |
| 3 | x-Philadelphia 76ers | 52 | 30 | .634 | 10 |
| 4 | x-Detroit Pistons | 49 | 33 | .598 | 13 |
| 5 | x-New York Knicks | 47 | 35 | .573 | 15 |
| 6 | x-New Jersey Nets | 45 | 37 | .549 | 17 |
| 7 | x-Atlanta Hawks | 40 | 42 | .488 | 22 |
| 8 | x-Washington Bullets | 35 | 47 | .427 | 27 |
| 9 | Cleveland Cavaliers | 28 | 54 | .341 | 34 |
| 10 | Chicago Bulls | 27 | 55 | .329 | 35 |
| 11 | Indiana Pacers | 26 | 56 | .317 | 36 |

z - clinched division title
y - clinched division title
x - clinched playoff spot

=== Game log ===
1983–84 game log
Total: 28–54 (Home: 23–18; Road: 5–36)
October: 0–2 (home: 0–2; road: 0–0)

| Game | Date | Team | Score | High points | High rebounds | High assists | Location Attendance | Record |
|---|---|---|---|---|---|---|---|---|
| 1 | October 28, 1983 | New York | L 106–113 | | | | Richfield Coliseum | 0–1 |
| 2 | October 29, 1983 | Boston | L 89–108 | | | | Richfield Coliseum | 0–2 |

November: 5–10 (home: 5–0; road: 0–10)

| Game | Date | Team | Score | High points | High rebounds | High assists | Location Attendance | Record |
|---|---|---|---|---|---|---|---|---|
| 3 | November 1, 1983 | @ New Jersey | L 113–125 | | | | Brendan Byrne Arena | 0–3 |
| 4 | November 2, 1983 | Houston | W 103–94 | | | | Richfield Coliseum | 1–3 |
| 5 | November 4, 1983 | Dallas | W 105–84 | | | | Richfield Coliseum | 2–3 |
| 14 | November 26, 1983 | @ New York | L 84–96 | | | | Madison Square Garden | 3–11 |

December: 4–10 (home: 3–4; road: 1–6)

| Game | Date | Team | Score | High points | High rebounds | High assists | Location Attendance | Record |
|---|---|---|---|---|---|---|---|---|
| 19 | December 3, 1983 | @ Atlanta | L 91–102 | | | | The Omni; 6,291 | 6–13 |
| 20 | December 6, 1983 | @ New Jersey | L 105–114 | | | | Brendan Byrne Arena | 6–14 |
| 21 | December 7, 1983 | Atlanta | W 106–92 | | | | Richfield Coliseum; 2,589 | 7–14 |
| 25 | December 14, 1983 | @ Boston | L 108–110 | | | | Boston Garden | 8–17 |
| 30 | December 29, 1983 | Atlanta | W 88–77 | | | | Richfield Coliseum; 3,622 | 9–21 |
| 31 | December 30, 1983 | @ Atlanta | L 98–109 | | | | The Omni; 5,201 | 9–22 |

January: 4–8 (home: 2–5; road: 2–3)

| Game | Date | Team | Score | High points | High rebounds | High assists | Location Attendance | Record |
|---|---|---|---|---|---|---|---|---|
| 34 | January 6, 1984 | @ Boston | L 97–115 | | | | Boston Garden | 9–25 |
| 42 | January 24, 1984 | Boston | L 97–118 | | | | Richfield Coliseum | 12–30 |

February: 9–5 (home: 8–1; road: 1–4)

| Game | Date | Team | Score | High points | High rebounds | High assists | Location Attendance | Record |
|---|---|---|---|---|---|---|---|---|
| 50 | February 14, 1984 | New Jersey | W 103–93 | | | | Richfield Coliseum | 19–31 |
| 53 | February 21, 1984 | @ Atlanta | L 84–102 | | | | The Omni; 4,940 | 20–33 |

March: 4–13 (home: 4–3; road: 0–10)

| Game | Date | Team | Score | High points | High rebounds | High assists | Location Attendance | Record |
|---|---|---|---|---|---|---|---|---|
| 61 | March 7, 1984 | @ Dallas | L 103–115 | | | | Reunion Arena | 22–39 |
| 62 | March 11, 1984 | @ Houston | L 101–108 | | | | The Summit | 22–40 |
| 63 | March 13, 1984 | Atlanta | W 92–83 | | | | Richfield Coliseum; 3,103 | 23–40 |
| 64 | March 15, 1984 | @ New York | L 82–105 | | | | Madison Square Garden | 23–41 |
| 68 | March 21, 1984 | New York | W 100–99 | | | | Richfield Coliseum | 24–44 |
| 71 | March 27, 1984 | New Jersey | W 106–103 | | | | Richfield Coliseum | 26–45 |

April: 2–6 (home: 1–3; road: 1–3)

| Game | Date | Team | Score | High points | High rebounds | High assists | Location Attendance | Record |
|---|---|---|---|---|---|---|---|---|
| 75 | April 3, 1984 | Boston | L 86–98 | | | | Richfield Coliseum | 26–49 |
| 77 | April 6, 1984 | @ Boston | L 94–113 | | | | Boston Garden | 27–50 |
| 78 | April 8, 1984 | @ New Jersey | L 97–124 | | | | Brendan Byrne Arena | 27–51 |
| 79 | April 9, 1984 | @ New York | L 113–118 | | | | Madison Square Garden | 27–52 |
| 81 | April 13, 1984 | New York | L 98–107 | | | | Richfield Coliseum | 27–54 |

1983–84 schedule

== Player statistics ==
Legend
| GP | Games played | GS | Games started | MPG | Minutes per game |
| FG% | Field-goal percentage | 3P% | 3-point field-goal percentage | FT% | Free-throw percentage |
| RPG | Rebounds per game | APG | Assists per game | SPG | Steals per game |
| BPG | Blocks per game | PPG | Points per game |

| Player | GP | GS | MPG | FG% | 3FG% | FT% | RPG | APG | SPG | BPG | PPG |
|---|---|---|---|---|---|---|---|---|---|---|---|
| World B. Free | 75 | 71 | 31.7 | 44.5 | 31.9 | 78.4 | 2.9 | 3.0 | 1.3 | 0.1 | 22.3 |
| Cliff Robinson | 73 | 70 | 32.9 | 45.0 | 50.0 | 70.1 | 10.3 | 2.5 | 0.7 | 0.4 | 17.8 |
| Lonnie Shelton | 79 | 78 | 26.6 | 47.6 | 20.0 | 76.4 | 4.8 | 2.3 | 1.0 | 0.7 | 10.8 |
| Phil Hubbard | 80 | 6 | 22.5 | 51.1 | 0.0 | 73.9 | 4.8 | 1.1 | 0.9 | 0.1 | 10.8 |
| Geoff Huston | 77 | 56 | 26.5 | 49.8 | 18.2 | 71.4 | 1.2 | 5.4 | 0.5 | 0.0 | 10.5 |
| Paul Thompson | 82 | 10 | 21.1 | 46.7 | 23.1 | 77.2 | 3.8 | 1.5 | 0.9 | 0.5 | 9.0 |
| John Bagley | 76 | 19 | 22.5 | 42.3 | 11.8 | 79.3 | 2.1 | 4.4 | 1.0 | 0.1 | 8.9 |
| Jeff Cook | 81 | 21 | 24.1 | 48.6 | 50.0 | 72.3 | 6.0 | 1.5 | 0.8 | 0.6 | 5.8 |
| Roy Hinson | 80 | 61 | 23.2 | 49.6 | 0.0 | 59.0 | 6.2 | 0.9 | 0.4 | 1.8 | 5.5 |
| Stewart Granger | 56 | 13 | 13.2 | 42.9 | 30.8 | 75.7 | 1.0 | 2.4 | 0.4 | 0.0 | 4.5 |
| John Garris | 33 | 1 | 8.1 | 51.0 | 0.0 | 79.4 | 2.3 | 0.3 | 0.2 | 0.2 | 4.0 |
| Ben Poquette | 51 | 4 | 16.8 | 43.9 | 20.0 | 79.1 | 3.6 | 1.0 | 0.4 | 0.6 | 3.6 |
| Geoff Crompton | 7 | 0 | 3.3 | 12.5 | 0.0 | 50.0 | 1.3 | 0.1 | 0.1 | 0.1 | 0.7 |

Player statistics citation:
