= 1984 NBA playoffs =

Postseason tournament

Tournament details
- Dates: April 17–June 12, 1984
- Season: 1983–84
- Teams: 16

Final positions
- Champions: Boston Celtics (15th title)
- Runners-up: Los Angeles Lakers
- Semifinalists: Milwaukee Bucks; Phoenix Suns

Tournament statistics
- Scoring leader(s): Larry Bird (Celtics) (27.5 PPG)

Awards
- MVP: Larry Bird (Celtics)

The 1984 NBA playoffs was the postseason tournament of the National Basketball Association's 1983–84 season. The tournament concluded with the Eastern Conference champion Boston Celtics defeating the Western Conference champion Los Angeles Lakers 4 games to 3 in the NBA Finals. Larry Bird was named NBA Finals MVP.

This was the first postseason allowing 16 teams to qualify, a format still in use though the NBA used a play-in tournament to determine the 7th and 8th seeds since 2021. The first round format was also changed from best-of-3 to best-of 5.

It was the first NBA Finals meeting between the Celtics and Lakers since 1969; they met 7 times in the Finals from 1959 to 1969, with Boston coming out on top each year. Going into the 1984 playoffs, the Lakers had already won 2 titles in the 1980s and the Celtics 1, making the revival of the Celtics–Lakers rivalry arguably inevitable and certainly highly anticipated.

Two teams made their playoff debuts and won their first playoff series: the Utah Jazz (who joined the NBA for the 1974–75 season as the New Orleans Jazz) and Dallas Mavericks, a 1980 expansion team. The Jazz did not miss the playoffs again until 2004.

The Detroit Pistons made the playoffs for the first time since 1977, starting a string of nine consecutive appearances that included five straight Conference Finals appearances (1987–1991), three consecutive NBA Finals appearances (1988, 1989, and 1990) and two NBA Championships. They did not miss the playoffs again until 1993.

The New Jersey Nets won a playoff series for the first time in their NBA history, upsetting the defending champion Philadelphia 76ers in 5. This was also the only time the road team won every game in a five-game playoff series. The Nets would not win a playoff series again until 2002.

This was the final postseason appearance for the Kansas City Kings, as the team moved to Sacramento, California two seasons later. Kemper Arena hosted its final NBA playoff game.

The Kingdome also hosted its final NBA playoff game, as the Seattle SuperSonics moved back full-time to the Seattle Center Coliseum two years later. However, the Kingdome continued to host Sonics regular season games on occasion until 1994.

The 1984 playoffs also involved two of the hottest games in NBA history. Game 5 of the First Round between the Knicks and Pistons was played at Joe Louis Arena, as the Pontiac Silverdome was unavailable, with temperatures reaching as high as 120°. Game 5 of the NBA Finals between the Celtics and Lakers at Boston Garden reached temperatures as high as 100°, as the Garden lacked air-conditioning, coupled with the sweltering outdoors conditions in Boston.

This is the last postseason of using the 2-2-1-1-1 format of the NBA Finals until 2014; the 1985 NBA Finals was changed to the 2-3-2 format the next season.

== Bracket ==
First Round	Conference Semifinals
E1	Boston*	3
E8	Washington	1
E1	Boston*	4
E5	New York	3
E4	Detroit	2
E5	New York	3
Eastern Conference
E3	Philadelphia	2
E6	New Jersey	3
E6	New Jersey	2
E2	Milwaukee*	4
E2	Milwaukee*	3
E7	Atlanta	2
W1	Los Angeles*	3
W8	Kansas City	0
W1	Los Angeles*	4
W4	Dallas	1
W4	Dallas	3
W5	Seattle	2
Western Conference
W3	Portland	2
W6	Phoenix	3
W6	Phoenix	4
W2	Utah*	2
W2	Utah*	3
W7	Denver	2

Conference Finals
E1	Boston*	4
E2	Milwaukee*	1
W1	Los Angeles*	4
W6	Phoenix	2

NBA Finals
E1	Boston*	4
W1	Los Angeles*	3

- * Division winner
- Bold Series winner
- Italic Team with home-court advantage

== First round ==
=== Eastern Conference first round ===
==== (1) Boston Celtics vs. (8) Washington Bullets ====
April 17

Boxscore

Washington Bullets 83, Boston Celtics 91
Scoring by quarter: 27–27, 12–19, 20–22, 24–23
Pts: Ricky Sobers 24; Rebs: Rick Mahorn 14; Asts: Jeff Ruland 10	Pts: Larry Bird 23; Rebs: Robert Parish 14; Asts: Larry Bird 12
Boston leads series, 1–0

Boston Garden, Boston, Massachusetts
Attendance: 14,890

April 19

Boxscore

Washington Bullets 85, Boston Celtics 88
Scoring by quarter: 29–19, 18–30, 21–20, 17–19
Pts: Greg Ballard 20; Rebs: Jeff Ruland 10; Asts: Jeff Ruland 8	Pts: Larry Bird 23; Rebs: Larry Bird 12; Asts: Larry Bird 6
Boston leads series, 2–0

Boston Garden, Boston, Massachusetts
Attendance: 14,890

April 21

Boxscore

Boston Celtics 108, Washington Bullets 111 (OT)
Scoring by quarter: 27–24, 22–24, 17–29, 32–21, Overtime: 10–13
Pts: Larry Bird 27; Rebs: Robert Parish 16; Asts: Bird, Johnson 6 each	Pts: Jeff Ruland 33; Rebs: Rick Mahorn 15; Asts: Ricky Sobers 11
Boston leads series, 2–1

Capital Centre, Landover, Maryland
Attendance: 8,359
Referees: Hugh Evans, Ed Middleton

- Robert Parish hits the game-tying jumper with 21 seconds left to force OT.

April 24

Boxscore

Boston Celtics 99, Washington Bullets 96
Scoring by quarter: 21–24, 31–17, 18–24, 29–31
Pts: Robert Parish 20; Rebs: Robert Parish 12; Asts: Larry Bird 7	Pts: Jeff Ruland 30; Rebs: Jeff Ruland 15; Asts: Jeff Ruland 8
Boston wins series, 3–1

Capital Centre, Landover, Maryland
Attendance: 13,853
Referees: John Vanak, Hue Hollins, Wally Rooney (alternate)

Regular-season series
Boston won 4–2 in the regular-season series

November 5, 1983

Recap

Boston Celtics 120, Washington Bullets 117

Capital Centre, Landover, Maryland

December 16, 1983

Recap

Washington Bullets 100, Boston Celtics 93

Boston Garden, Boston

January 4, 1984

Recap

Washington Bullets 104, Boston Celtics 113

Boston Garden, Boston

March 6, 1984

Recap

Boston Celtics 108, Washington Bullets 85

Capital Centre, Landover, Maryland

March 14, 1984

Recap

Washington Bullets 103, Boston Celtics 99

Boston Garden, Boston

March 27, 1984

Recap

Boston Celtics 106, Washington Bullets 93

Capital Centre, Landover, Maryland

This was the third playoff meeting between these two teams, with each team winning one series apiece.

Previous playoff series
Tied 1–1 in all-time playoff series

1975

Boston Celtics 2, Washington Bullets 4

1975 Eastern Conference Finals

1982

Boston Celtics 4, Washington Bullets 1

1982 Eastern Conference Semifinals

==== (2) Milwaukee Bucks vs. (7) Atlanta Hawks ====
April 17

Boxscore

Atlanta Hawks 89, Milwaukee Bucks 105
Scoring by quarter: 24–30, 16–25, 21–30, 28–20
Pts: Dan Roundfield 21; Rebs: Dan Roundfield 10; Asts: Johnny Davis 7	Pts: Sidney Moncrief 19; Rebs: Paul Mokeski 9 Asts: Sidney Moncrief 6
Milwaukee leads series, 1–0

MECCA Arena, Milwaukee, Wisconsin
Attendance: 10,107

April 19

Boxscore

Atlanta Hawks 87, Milwaukee Bucks 101
Scoring by quarter: 14–24, 27–29, 26–24, 20–24
Pts: Dominique Wilkins 22; Rebs: Roundfield, Rollins 7 each Asts: Eddie Johnson 8	Pts: Marques Johnson 27; Rebs: Alton Lister 10; Asts: Sidney Moncrief 7
Milwaukee leads series, 2–0

MECCA Arena, Milwaukee, Wisconsin
Attendance: 11,052

April 21

Boxscore

Milwaukee Bucks 94, Atlanta Hawks 103
Scoring by quarter: 24–25, 26–22, 19–31, 25–25
Pts: Marques Johnson 28; Rebs: M. Johnson, Lanier 10 each Asts: three players 3 each	Pts: Dan Roundfield 25; Rebs: Roundfield, Brown 7 each Asts: Eddie Johnson 7
Milwaukee leads series, 2–1

Omni Coliseum, Atlanta, Georgia
Attendance: 5,395

April 24

Boxscore

Milwaukee Bucks 97, Atlanta Hawks 100
Scoring by quarter: 22–27, 23–24, 30–23, 22–26
Pts: Junior Bridgeman 20; Rebs: Sidney Moncrief 13; Asts: Mike Dunleavy 6	Pts: Wilkins, Rivers 19 each Rebs: Dan Roundfield 13; Asts: Johnny Davis 6
Series tied, 2–2

Omni Coliseum, Atlanta, Georgia
Attendance: 6,435

April 26

Boxscore

Atlanta Hawks 89, Milwaukee Bucks 118
Scoring by quarter: 18–22, 21–32, 23–31, 27–33
Pts: Doc Rivers 21; Rebs: Dominique Wilkins 13; Asts: Doc Rivers 6	Pts: Sidney Moncrief 20; Rebs: Bob Lanier 11; Asts: Sidney Moncrief 8
Milwaukee wins series, 3–2

MECCA Arena, Milwaukee, Wisconsin
Attendance: 11,052

Regular-season series
Tied 3–3 in the regular-season series

November 6, 1983

Recap

Atlanta Hawks 84, Milwaukee Bucks 97

MECCA Arena, Milwaukee

January 6, 1984

Recap

Milwaukee Bucks 87, Atlanta Hawks 91

The Omni, Atlanta

January 18, 1984

Recap

Atlanta Hawks 90, Milwaukee Bucks 99

MECCA Arena, Milwaukee

January 25, 1984

Recap

Milwaukee Bucks 105, Atlanta Hawks 109

The Omni, Atlanta

March 6, 1984

Recap

Milwaukee Bucks 109, Atlanta Hawks 104 (OT)

The Omni, Atlanta

March 11, 1984

Recap

Atlanta Hawks 108, Milwaukee Bucks 94

MECCA Arena, Milwaukee

This was the first playoff meeting between the Hawks and the Bucks.

==== (3) Philadelphia 76ers vs. (6) New Jersey Nets ====
April 18

Boxscore

New Jersey Nets 116, Philadelphia 76ers 101
Scoring by quarter: 39–29, 25–27, 22–19, 30–26
Pts: Buck Williams 25; Rebs: Buck Williams 16; Asts: Micheal Ray Richardson 9	Pts: Andrew Toney 24; Rebs: Moses Malone 11; Asts: Julius Erving 8
New Jersey leads series, 1–0

Spectrum, Philadelphia, Pennsylvania
Attendance: 12,511
Referees: Dick Bavetta, Hugh Evans

April 20

Boxscore

New Jersey Nets 116, Philadelphia 76ers 102
Scoring by quarter: 32–29, 35–21, 22–23, 27–29
Pts: Micheal Ray Richardson 32; Rebs: Buck Williams 9 Asts: Micheal Ray Richardson 9	Pts: Moses Malone 25; Rebs: Moses Malone 12; Asts: Toney, Richardson 4 each
New Jersey leads series, 2–0

Spectrum, Philadelphia, Pennsylvania
Attendance: 14,025
Referees: John Vanak, Hue Hollins

April 22

Boxscore

Philadelphia 76ers 108, New Jersey Nets 100
Scoring by quarter: 25–29, 26–24, 27–23, 30–24
Pts: Julius Erving 27; Rebs: Moses Malone 17; Asts: Erving, Cheeks 5 each	Pts: Buck Williams 21; Rebs: Buck Williams 17; Asts: Micheal Ray Richardson 11
New Jersey leads series, 2–1

Brendan Byrne Arena, East Rutherford, New Jersey
Attendance: 12,399
Referees: Jake O'Donnell, Lee Jones

April 24

Boxscore

Philadelphia 76ers 110, New Jersey Nets 102
Scoring by quarter: 34–22, 18–22, 28–25, 30–33
Pts: Malone, Erving 22 each Rebs: Moses Malone 15; Asts: Julius Erving 8	Pts: Albert King 20; Rebs: Buck Williams 18; Asts: Micheal Ray Richardson 8
Series tied, 2–2

Brendan Byrne Arena, East Rutherford, New Jersey
Attendance: 20,149
Referees: Darell Garretson, Mike Mathis

April 26

Boxscore

New Jersey Nets 101, Philadelphia 76ers 98
Scoring by quarter: 31–25, 19–28, 26–23, 25–22
Pts: Richardson, Birdsong 24 each Rebs: Buck Williams 16; Asts: Richardson, Birdsong 6 each	Pts: Andrew Toney 22; Rebs: Moses Malone 14; Asts: Maurice Cheeks 7
New Jersey wins series, 3–2

Spectrum, Philadelphia, Pennsylvania
Attendance: 17,921
Referees: Jack Madden, Jess Kersey

Regular-season series
Tied 3–3 in the regular-season series

November 5, 1983

Recap

Philadelphia 76ers 119, New Jersey Nets 112

Brendan Byrne Arena, East Rutherford, New Jersey

December 9, 1983

Recap

New Jersey Nets 100, Philadelphia 76ers 93

Spectrum, Philadelphia

January 6, 1984

Recap

New Jersey Nets 104, Philadelphia 76ers 108

Spectrum, Philadelphia

February 17, 1984

Recap

New Jersey Nets 109, Philadelphia 76ers 114

Spectrum, Philadelphia

February 21, 1984

Recap

Philadelphia 76ers 116, New Jersey Nets 119 (OT)

Brendan Byrne Arena, East Rutherford, New Jersey

April 10, 1984

Recap

Philadelphia 76ers 102, New Jersey Nets 106

Brendan Byrne Arena, East Rutherford, New Jersey

This was the second playoff meeting between these two teams, with the 76ers winning the first meeting.

Previous playoff series
Philadelphia leads 1–0 in all-time playoff series

1979

New Jersey Nets 0, Philadelphia 76ers 2

1979 Eastern Conference First Round

==== (4) Detroit Pistons vs. (5) New York Knicks ====
April 17

Boxscore

New York Knicks 94, Detroit Pistons 93
Scoring by quarter: 17–31, 23–22, 24–23, 30–17
Pts: Bernard King 36; Rebs: Bill Cartwright 11; Asts: Darrell Walker 7	Pts: Kelly Tripucka 26; Rebs: Kent Benson 14; Asts: Isiah Thomas 9
New York leads series, 1–0

Pontiac Silverdome, Pontiac, Michigan
Attendance: 14,127

April 19

Boxscore

New York Knicks 105, Detroit Pistons 113
Scoring by quarter: 33–38, 30–30, 21–24, 21–21
Pts: Bernard King 46; Rebs: Truck Robinson 11; Asts: Ray Williams 9	Pts: Bill Laimbeer 31; Rebs: Bill Laimbeer 15; Asts: Isiah Thomas 13
Series tied, 1–1

Pontiac Silverdome, Pontiac, Michigan
Attendance: 14,275

April 22

Boxscore

Detroit Pistons 113, New York Knicks 120
Scoring by quarter: 16–26, 20–28, 36–32, 41–34
Pts: Kelly Tripucka 40; Rebs: Bill Laimbeer 10; Asts: Isiah Thomas 5	Pts: Bernard King 46; Rebs: Bernard King 10; Asts: Rory Sparrow 10
New York leads series, 2–1

Madison Square Garden, New York City, New York
Attendance: 16,354
Referees: Jess Kersey, Hue Hollins, Dick Bavetta (alternate)

April 25

Boxscore

Detroit Pistons 119, New York Knicks 112
Scoring by quarter: 35-34, 30–33, 24–21, 30–24
Pts: Isiah Thomas 22; Rebs: Bill Laimbeer 10; Asts: Isiah Thomas 16	Pts: Bernard King 41; Rebs: Truck Robinson 12; Asts: Rory Sparrow 10
Series tied, 2–2

Madison Square Garden, New York City, New York
Attendance: 18,205

April 27

Boxscore

New York Knicks 127, Detroit Pistons 123 (OT)
Scoring by quarter: 31–36, 28–25, 26–18, 29–35, Overtime: 13–9
Pts: Bernard King 44; Rebs: Bernard King 12; Asts: Ray Williams 12	Pts: Isiah Thomas 35; Rebs: Bill Laimbeer 17; Asts: Isiah Thomas 12
New York wins series, 3–2

Joe Louis Arena, Detroit, Michigan
Attendance: 21,208
Referees: Darell Garretson, Earl Strom, Ed Middleton (alternate)

- Bernard King/Isiah Thomas Duel. King put up 44 points while having the flu and both middle fingers dislocated, while Thomas scored 16 points in the last 93 seconds of regulation to force OT.

Regular-season series
Detroit won 4–2 in the regular-season series

November 19, 1983

Recap

Detroit Pistons 101, New York Knicks 104 (OT)

Madison Square Garden, New York City

December 28, 1983

Recap

Detroit Pistons 111, New York Knicks 108

Madison Square Garden, New York City

January 6, 1984

Recap

New York Knicks 107, Detroit Pistons 118

Pontiac Silverdome, Pontiac, Michigan

February 22, 1984

Recap

New York Knicks 111, Detroit Pistons 114

Pontiac Silverdome, Pontiac, Michigan

March 2, 1984

Recap

New York Knicks 117, Detroit Pistons 102

Pontiac Silverdome, Pontiac, Michigan

April 6, 1984

Recap

Detroit Pistons 115, New York Knicks 107

Madison Square Garden, New York City

This was the first playoff meeting between the Knicks and the Pistons.

=== Western Conference first round ===
==== (1) Los Angeles Lakers vs. (8) Kansas City Kings ====
April 18

Boxscore

Kansas City Kings 105, Los Angeles Lakers 116
Scoring by quarter: 26–30, 18–27, 20–32, 41–27
Pts: Eddie Johnson 25; Rebs: LaSalle Thompson 7 Asts: Larry Drew 7	Pts: Magic Johnson 26; Rebs: three players 7 each Asts: Magic Johnson 11
Los Angeles leads series, 1–0

The Forum, Inglewood, California
Attendance: 13,918

April 20

Boxscore

Kansas City Kings 102, Los Angeles Lakers 109
Scoring by quarter: 23–30, 18–26, 32–25, 29–28
Pts: LaSalle Thompson 23; Rebs: LaSalle Thompson 14; Asts: Reggie Theus 6	Pts: Kareem Abdul-Jabbar 26; Rebs: Kareem Abdul-Jabbar 11; Asts: Magic Johnson 11
Los Angeles leads series, 2–0

The Forum, Inglewood, California
Attendance: 14,986

April 22

Boxscore

Los Angeles Lakers 108, Kansas City Kings 102
Scoring by quarter: 35–24, 24–19, 25–29, 24–30
Pts: Kareem Abdul-Jabbar 23; Rebs: M. Johnson, Worthy 10 each Asts: Magic Johnson 13	Pts: Theus, Woodson 22 each Rebs: Larry Micheaux 10; Asts: Reggie Theus 7
Los Angeles wins series, 3–0

Kemper Arena, Kansas City, Missouri
Attendance: 7,261

Regular-season series
Los Angeles won 5–0 in the regular-season series

October 28, 1983

Recap

Los Angeles Lakers 117, Kansas City Kings 107

Kemper Arena, Kansas City, Missouri

December 8, 1983

Recap

Kansas City Kings 106, Los Angeles Lakers 129

The Forum, Inglewood, California

January 12, 1984

Recap

Los Angeles Lakers 95, Kansas City Kings 89

Kemper Arena, Kansas City, Missouri

March 21, 1984

Recap

Los Angeles Lakers 123, Kansas City Kings 116

Kemper Arena, Kansas City, Missouri

April 6, 1984

Recap

Kansas City Kings 97, Los Angeles Lakers 112

The Forum, Inglewood, California

This was the seventh playoff meeting between these two teams, with the Lakers winning five of the first six meetings. All previous series took place while the Lakers franchise were in Minneapolis and the Royals/Kings franchise in Rochester.

Previous playoff series
Los Angeles/ Minneapolis leads 5–1 in all-time playoff series

1949

Minneapolis Lakers 2, Rochester Royals 0

1949 Western Division Finals

1951

Minneapolis Lakers 1, Rochester Royals 3

1951 Western Division Finals

1952

Minneapolis Lakers 3, Rochester Royals 1

1952 Western Division Finals

1954

Minneapolis Lakers 1, Rochester Royals 0

1954 Western Division Round Robin Semifinals

1954

Minneapolis Lakers 2, Rochester Royals 1

1954 Western Division Finals

1955

Minneapolis Lakers 2, Rochester Royals 1

1955 Western Division Semifinals

==== (2) Utah Jazz vs. (7) Denver Nuggets ====
April 17

Boxscore

Denver Nuggets 121, Utah Jazz 123
Scoring by quarter: 27–29, 28–28, 28–41, 38–25
Pts: Kiki VanDeWeghe 33; Rebs: Dan Issel 10; Asts: Rob Williams 8	Pts: Adrian Dantley 30; Rebs: Adrian Dantley 9 Asts: Rickey Green 12
Utah leads series, 1–0

Salt Palace, Salt Lake City, Utah
Attendance: 10,255
Referees: Jake O'Donnell, Lee Jones

April 19

Boxscore

Denver Nuggets 132, Utah Jazz 116
Scoring by quarter: 38–29, 32–32, 32–26, 30–29
Pts: Dan Issel 33; Rebs: T. R. Dunn 10; Asts: Rob Williams 5	Pts: Adrian Dantley 27; Rebs: Dantley, Wilkins 6 each Asts: Rickey Green 6
Series tied, 1–1

Salt Palace, Salt Lake City, Utah
Attendance: 12,413
Referees: Jess Kersey, Tommy Nunez

April 22

Boxscore

Utah Jazz 117, Denver Nuggets 121
Scoring by quarter: 36–25, 28–35, 24–30, 29–31
Pts: Adrian Dantley 29; Rebs: Thurl Bailey 11; Asts: Rickey Green 12	Pts: Alex English 29; Rebs: T. R. Dunn 10; Asts: Alex English 6
Denver leads series, 2–1

McNichols Sports Arena, Denver, Colorado
Attendance: 14,681
Referees: Paul Mihalak, Joe Crawford, Tommy Nunez (alternate)

April 24

Boxscore

Utah Jazz 129, Denver Nuggets 124
Scoring by quarter: 35–34, 36–37, 26–29, 32–24
Pts: Adrian Dantley 39; Rebs: Adrian Dantley 8 Asts: Adrian Dantley 7	Pts: Dan Issel 32; Rebs: Alex English 10; Asts: Alex English 6
Series tied, 2–2

McNichols Sports Arena, Denver, Colorado
Attendance: 16,108
Referees: Hugh Evans, Bill Oakes, Bruce Alexander (alternate)

April 26

Boxscore

Denver Nuggets 111, Utah Jazz 127
Scoring by quarter: 27–41, 31–31, 29–21, 24–34
Pts: Dan Issel 25; Rebs: Alex English 11; Asts: Alex English 9	Pts: Adrian Dantley 30; Rebs: Adrian Dantley 12; Asts: Rickey Green 16
Utah wins series, 3–2

Salt Palace, Salt Lake City, Utah
Attendance: 12,731
Referees: Earl Strom, Ed Middleton

Regular-season series
Tied 3–3 in the regular-season series

October 28, 1983

Recap

Utah Jazz 125, Denver Nuggets 139

McNichols Sports Arena, Denver, Colorado

November 25, 1983

Recap

Denver Nuggets 124, Utah Jazz 126

Salt Palace Acord Arena, Salt Lake City

December 23, 1983

Recap

Denver Nuggets 116, Utah Jazz 118

Salt Palace Acord Arena, Salt Lake City

December 30, 1983

Recap

Utah Jazz 130, Denver Nuggets 135

McNichols Sports Arena, Denver, Colorado

March 3, 1984

Recap

Utah Jazz 122, Denver Nuggets 131

McNichols Sports Arena, Denver, Colorado

April 10, 1984

Recap

Denver Nuggets 120, Utah Jazz 135

Thomas & Mack Center, Paradise, Nevada

This was the first playoff meeting between the Jazz and the Nuggets.

==== (3) Portland Trail Blazers vs. (6) Phoenix Suns ====
April 18

Boxscore

Phoenix Suns 113, Portland Trail Blazers 106
Scoring by quarter: 31–28, 27–30, 29–26, 26–22
Pts: James Edwards 23; Rebs: Larry Nance 9 Asts: Walter Davis 13	Pts: Kenny Carr 24; Rebs: Calvin Natt 9 Asts: Thompson, Valentine 6 each
Phoenix leads series, 1–0

Memorial Coliseum, Portland, Oregon
Attendance: 12,666

April 20

Boxscore

Phoenix Suns 116, Portland Trail Blazers 122
Scoring by quarter: 37–34, 21–30, 25–39, 33–19
Pts: Walter Davis 25; Rebs: Lucas, Davis 5 each Asts: Alvan Adams 5	Pts: Jim Paxson 27; Rebs: Mychal Thompson 13; Asts: Darnell Valentine 8
Series tied, 1–1

Memorial Coliseum, Portland, Oregon
Attendance: 12,666

April 22

Boxscore

Portland Trail Blazers 103, Phoenix Suns 106
Scoring by quarter: 22–27, 32–26, 26–20, 23–33
Pts: Darnell Valentine 29; Rebs: Thompson, Carr 8 each Asts: Darnell Valentine 10	Pts: Walter Davis 27; Rebs: Nance, Lucas 10 each Asts: Walter Davis 10
Phoenix leads series, 2–1

Arizona Veterans Memorial Coliseum, Phoenix, Arizona
Attendance: 11,531

April 24

Boxscore

Portland Trail Blazers 113, Phoenix Suns 110
Scoring by quarter: 32–26, 24–26, 29–32, 28–26
Pts: Calvin Natt 30; Rebs: Calvin Natt 8 Asts: Darnell Valentine 13	Pts: Walter Davis 29; Rebs: Maurice Lucas 10; Asts: Davis, Macy 7 each
Series tied, 2–2

Arizona Veterans Memorial Coliseum, Phoenix, Arizona
Attendance: 14,660

April 26

Boxscore

Phoenix Suns 117, Portland Trail Blazers 105
Scoring by quarter: 35–25, 23–33, 25–17, 34–30
Pts: Walter Davis 29; Rebs: Maurice Lucas 12; Asts: Walter Davis 10	Pts: Jim Paxson 24; Rebs: Natt, Drexler 10 each Asts: Darnell Valentine 5
Phoenix wins series, 3–2

Memorial Coliseum, Portland, Oregon
Attendance: 12,666

Regular-season series
Portland won 4–2 in the regular-season series

November 6, 1983

Recap

Phoenix Suns 96, Portland Trail Blazers 122

Memorial Coliseum, Portland, Oregon

December 21, 1983

Recap

Portland Trail Blazers 116, Phoenix Suns 112

Arizona Veterans Memorial Coliseum, Phoenix, Arizona

February 1, 1984

Recap

Portland Trail Blazers 106, Phoenix Suns 109

Arizona Veterans Memorial Coliseum, Phoenix, Arizona

February 5, 1984

Recap

Phoenix Suns 82, Portland Trail Blazers 97

Memorial Coliseum, Portland, Oregon

March 23, 1984

Recap

Phoenix Suns 98, Portland Trail Blazers 124

Memorial Coliseum, Portland, Oregon

April 10, 1984

Recap

Portland Trail Blazers 88, Phoenix Suns 100

Arizona Veterans Memorial Coliseum, Phoenix, Arizona

This was the second playoff meeting between these two teams, with the Suns winning the first meeting.

Previous playoff series
Phoenix leads 1–0 in all-time playoff series

1979

Phoenix Suns 2, Portland Trail Blazers 1

1979 Western Conference First Round

==== (4) Dallas Mavericks vs. (5) Seattle SuperSonics ====
April 17

Boxscore

Seattle SuperSonics 86, Dallas Mavericks 88
Scoring by quarter: 33–23, 18–20, 21–26, 14–19
Pts: Gus Williams 37; Rebs: Danny Vranes 8 Asts: Gus Williams 8	Pts: Mark Aguirre 20; Rebs: Mark Aguirre 11; Asts: Brad Davis 10
Dallas leads series, 1–0

Reunion Arena, Dallas, Texas
Attendance: 17,007

Rolando Blackman scored a jump shot with eight seconds remaining to give Dallas the lead and ultimately the win in their first playoff game.

April 19

Boxscore

Seattle SuperSonics 95, Dallas Mavericks 92
Scoring by quarter: 27–21, 29–26, 20–22, 19–23
Pts: Tom Chambers 30; Rebs: Jack Sikma 10; Asts: Gus Williams 11	Pts: Rolando Blackman 28; Rebs: Mark Aguirre 17; Asts: Rolando Blackman 7
Series tied, 1–1

Reunion Arena, Dallas, Texas
Attendance: 17,007

- Gus Williams banks in the game-winning three-pointer at the buzzer.

April 21

Boxscore

Dallas Mavericks 94, Seattle SuperSonics 104
Scoring by quarter: 25–24, 32–28, 16–31, 21–21
Pts: Rolando Blackman 27; Rebs: Jay Vincent 10; Asts: Rolando Blackman 5	Pts: Jack Sikma 23; Rebs: Jack Sikma 17; Asts: Gus Williams 15
Seattle leads series, 2–1

Seattle Center Coliseum, Seattle, Washington
Attendance: 10,229

April 24

Boxscore

Dallas Mavericks 107, Seattle SuperSonics 96
Scoring by quarter: 27–20, 22–23, 30–22, 28–31
Pts: Mark Aguirre 29; Rebs: Aguirre, Vincent 11 each Asts: Brad Davis 8	Pts: Jack Sikma 27; Rebs: Jack Sikma 14; Asts: Gus Williams 9
Series tied, 2–2

Kingdome, Seattle, Washington
Attendance: 11,893

Scheduling conflicts meant that Game 4 was played at the old home of the Sonics with the Kingdome.

April 26

Boxscore

Seattle SuperSonics 104, Dallas Mavericks 105 (OT)
Scoring by quarter: 22–26, 27–23, 22–23, 24–23, Overtime: 9–10
Pts: Gus Williams 27; Rebs: Danny Vranes 11; Asts: Gus Williams 14	Pts: Rolando Blackman 29; Rebs: Jay Vincent 10; Asts: Rolando Blackman 8
Dallas wins series, 3–2

Moody Coliseum, University Park, Texas
Attendance: 9,007

Game 5 was not played at Reunion Arena because it was booked for a World Championship Tennis event. After considering the Dallas Convention Center, they elected to play it at Moody Coliseum, where they had played their training camp; they had to play the game on SMU's college court, which meant having to measure and tape down an improvised 3-point line. Blackman forced a jump shot with time expiring to force overtime. The final play wound up lasting fourteen minutes. With one second left on the clock at mid-court trying to inbound the ball, Jay Vincent tried to bounce the ball off Tom Chambers to run out the clock but Chambers caught the ball at mid-court and missed the shot. Dallas walked off the court believing the game was over. However, referee Mike Mathis and co-officials Jake O’Donnell and Tommy Nunez debated for several minutes what to do because the clock never actually started on the play. Somehow, Seattle was ruled to have the ball to inbound from midcourt with one second that saw the Mavericks ordered back on the court. The Mavericks foiled the subsequent inbound attempt to end the game. Earning the nickname "Moody Madness" among Maverick fans, the victory was the first playoff series victory for the Mavericks in franchise history.

Regular-season series
Seattle won 4–1 in the regular-season series

December 9, 1983

Recap

Dallas Mavericks 124, Seattle SuperSonics 132

Kingdome, Seattle

January 4, 1984

Recap

Seattle SuperSonics 102, Dallas Mavericks 105

Reunion Arena, Dallas

January 18, 1984

Recap

Dallas Mavericks 107, Seattle SuperSonics 114

Tacoma Dome, Tacoma, Washington

February 5, 1984

Recap

Dallas Mavericks 96, Seattle SuperSonics 104

Kingdome, Seattle

February 29, 1984

Recap

Seattle SuperSonics 127, Dallas Mavericks 124 (2OT)

Reunion Arena, Dallas

This was the first playoff meeting between the Mavericks and the SuperSonics.

== Conference semifinals ==
=== Eastern Conference semifinals ===
==== (1) Boston Celtics vs. (5) New York Knicks ====
April 29

Boxscore

New York Knicks 92, Boston Celtics 110
Scoring by quarter: 22–31, 22–33, 24–28, 24–18
Pts: Bernard King 26; Rebs: Truck Robinson 9 Asts: Rory Sparrow 6	Pts: Kevin McHale 25; Rebs: Robert Parish 12; Asts: Larry Bird 12
Boston leads series, 1–0

Boston Garden, Boston, Massachusetts
Attendance: 14,890

May 2

Boxscore

New York Knicks 102, Boston Celtics 116
Scoring by quarter: 27–34, 30–32, 21–25, 24–25
Pts: Bill Cartwright 25; Rebs: Bill Cartwright 11; Asts: Rory Sparrow 5	Pts: Larry Bird 37; Rebs: Bird, Parish 11 each Asts: Dennis Johnson 7
Boston leads series, 2–0

Boston Garden, Boston, Massachusetts
Attendance: 14,890

May 4

Boxscore

Boston Celtics 92, New York Knicks 100
Scoring by quarter: 25–33, 27–17, 18–27, 22–23
Pts: Larry Bird 24; Rebs: Larry Bird 11; Asts: Dennis Johnson 4	Pts: Bill Cartwright 25; Rebs: King, Robinson 9 each Asts: Rory Sparrow 10
Boston leads series, 2–1

Madison Square Garden, New York City, New York
Attendance: 19,591

May 6

Boxscore

Boston Celtics 113, New York Knicks 118
Scoring by quarter: 25–36, 30–30, 28–21, 30–31
Pts: Larry Bird 29; Rebs: Larry Bird 11; Asts: Dennis Johnson 7	Pts: Bernard King 43; Rebs: Truck Robinson 9 Asts: Ray Williams 9
Series tied, 2–2

Madison Square Garden, New York City, New York
Attendance: 15,840

May 9

Boxscore

New York Knicks 99, Boston Celtics 121
Scoring by quarter: 20–32, 25–34, 31–22, 23–33
Pts: Bernard King 30; Rebs: Bill Cartwright 10; Asts: Ray Williams 10	Pts: Larry Bird 26; Rebs: Robert Parish 10; Asts: Larry Bird 10
Boston leads series, 3–2

Boston Garden, Boston, Massachusetts
Attendance: 14,890

May 11

Boxscore

Boston Celtics 104, New York Knicks 106
Scoring by quarter: 28–30, 23–29, 24–23, 29–24
Pts: Larry Bird 35; Rebs: Larry Bird 11; Asts: Gerald Henderson 8	Pts: Bernard King 44; Rebs: Bill Cartwright 14; Asts: Rory Sparrow 11
Series tied, 3–3

Madison Square Garden, New York City, New York
Attendance: 19,591

May 13

Boxscore

New York Knicks 104, Boston Celtics 121
Scoring by quarter: 26–36, 26–31, 23–29, 29–25
Pts: Bernard King 24; Rebs: Truck Robinson 9 Asts: Ray Williams 7	Pts: Larry Bird 39; Rebs: Larry Bird 12; Asts: Larry Bird 10
Boston wins series, 4–3

Boston Garden, Boston, Massachusetts
Attendance: 14,890

Regular-season series
Tied 3–3 in the regular-season series

November 18, 1983

Recap

New York Knicks 110, Boston Celtics 103

Boston Garden, Boston

November 22, 1983

Recap

Boston Celtics 113, New York Knicks 117 (2OT)

Madison Square Garden, New York City

December 13, 1983

Recap

Boston Celtics 102, New York Knicks 100

Madison Square Garden, New York City

February 29, 1984

Recap

New York Knicks 102, Boston Celtics 98

Boston Garden, Boston

March 22, 1984

Recap

Boston Celtics 108, New York Knicks 100

Madison Square Garden, New York City

April 11, 1984

Recap

New York Knicks 96, Boston Celtics 102

Boston Garden, Boston

This was the 11th playoff meeting between these two teams, with each team winning five series apiece.

Previous playoff series
Tied 5–5 in all-time playoff series

1951

Boston Celtics 0, New York Knicks 2

1951 Eastern Division Semifinals

1952

Boston Celtics 1, New York Knicks 2

1952 Eastern Division Semifinals

1953

Boston Celtics 1, New York Knicks 3

1953 Eastern Division Finals

1954

Boston Celtics 2, New York Knicks 0

1954 Eastern Division Round Robin Semifinals

1955

Boston Celtics 2, New York Knicks 1

1955 Eastern Division Semifinals

1967

Boston Celtics 3, New York Knicks 1

1967 Eastern Division Semifinals

1969

Boston Celtics 4, New York Knicks 2

1969 Eastern Division Finals

1972

Boston Celtics 1, New York Knicks 4

1972 Eastern Conference Finals

1973

Boston Celtics 3, New York Knicks 4

1973 Eastern Conference Finals

1974

Boston Celtics 4, New York Knicks 1

1974 Eastern Conference Finals

==== (2) Milwaukee Bucks vs. (6) New Jersey Nets ====
April 29

Boxscore

New Jersey Nets 106, Milwaukee Bucks 100
Scoring by quarter: 21–28, 23–22, 33–23, 29–27
Pts: Darryl Dawkins 32; Rebs: Buck Williams 17; Asts: Micheal Ray Richardson 8	Pts: Marques Johnson 23; Rebs: Bob Lanier 10; Asts: Marques Johnson 8
New Jersey leads series, 1–0

MECCA Arena, Milwaukee, Wisconsin
Attendance: 11,052

May 1

Boxscore

New Jersey Nets 94, Milwaukee Bucks 98
Scoring by quarter: 22–23, 16–20, 27–24, 29–31
Pts: Buck Williams 21; Rebs: Buck Williams 18; Asts: Williams, Richardson 5 each	Pts: Sidney Moncrief 28; Rebs: Sidney Moncrief 8 Asts: Johnson, Pressey 5 each
Series tied, 1–1

MECCA Arena, Milwaukee, Wisconsin
Attendance: 11,052

May 3

Boxscore

Milwaukee Bucks 100, New Jersey Nets 93
Scoring by quarter: 26–21, 25–20, 21–23, 28–29
Pts: Sidney Moncrief 27; Rebs: Alton Lister 12; Asts: Moncrief, Johnson 4 each	Pts: Darryl Dawkins 31; Rebs: Buck Williams 14; Asts: Richardson, Cook 6 each
Milwaukee leads series, 2–1

Brendan Byrne Arena, East Rutherford, New Jersey
Attendance: 15,868

May 5

Boxscore

Milwaukee Bucks 99, New Jersey Nets 106
Scoring by quarter: 30–25, 34–29, 16–17, 19–35
Pts: Sidney Moncrief 26; Rebs: Sidney Moncrief 9 Asts: Bob Lanier 7	Pts: Micheal Ray Richardson 24; Rebs: Buck Williams 10; Asts: Otis Birdsong 7
Series tied, 2–2

Brendan Byrne Arena, East Rutherford, New Jersey
Attendance: 14,623

May 8

Boxscore

New Jersey Nets 82, Milwaukee Bucks 94
Scoring by quarter: 20–24, 20–30, 21–18, 21–22
Pts: Darryl Dawkins 20; Rebs: Williams, Dawkins 8 each Asts: Micheal Ray Richardson 6	Pts: Marques Johnson 22; Rebs: Lister, Lanier 10 each Asts: Paul Pressey 7
Milwaukee leads series, 3–2

MECCA Arena, Milwaukee, Wisconsin
Attendance: 11,052

May 10

Boxscore

Milwaukee Bucks 98, New Jersey Nets 97
Scoring by quarter: 23–24, 20–22, 30–21, 25–30
Pts: Marques Johnson 25; Rebs: Marques Johnson 13; Asts: Sidney Moncrief 7	Pts: Darryl Dawkins 29; Rebs: Buck Williams 12; Asts: Micheal Ray Richardson 9
Milwaukee wins series, 4–2

Brendan Byrne Arena, East Rutherford, New Jersey
Attendance: 15,283

Regular-season series
Milwaukee won 4–2 in the regular-season series

November 11, 1983

Recap

Milwaukee Bucks 103, New Jersey Nets 107

Brendan Byrne Arena, East Rutherford, New Jersey

December 2, 1983

Recap

New Jersey Nets 107, Milwaukee Bucks 122

MECCA Arena, Milwaukee

December 28, 1983

Recap

Milwaukee Bucks 89, New Jersey Nets 85

Brendan Byrne Arena, East Rutherford, New Jersey

March 7, 1984

Recap

New Jersey Nets 106, Milwaukee Bucks 100

MECCA Arena, Milwaukee

March 21, 1984

Recap

Milwaukee Bucks 102, New Jersey Nets 95

Brendan Byrne Arena, East Rutherford, New Jersey

April 3, 1984

Recap

New Jersey Nets 92, Milwaukee Bucks 109

MECCA Arena, Milwaukee

This was the first playoff meeting between the Nets and the Bucks.

=== Western Conference semifinals ===
==== (1) Los Angeles Lakers vs. (4) Dallas Mavericks ====
April 28

Boxscore

Dallas Mavericks 91, Los Angeles Lakers 134
Scoring by quarter: 21–36, 17–32, 28–31, 25–35
Pts: Mark Aguirre 16; Rebs: Kurt Nimphius 10; Asts: Davis, Turner 4 each	Pts: Mike McGee 25; Rebs: Kurt Rambis 8 Asts: Magic Johnson 11
Los Angeles leads series, 1–0

The Forum, Inglewood, California
Attendance: 13,512

May 1

Boxscore

Dallas Mavericks 101, Los Angeles Lakers 117
Scoring by quarter: 24–30, 26–25, 22–35, 29–27
Pts: Rolando Blackman 27; Rebs: Dale Ellis 8 Asts: Mark Aguirre 5	Pts: Magic Johnson 27; Rebs: Kareem Abdul-Jabbar 10; Asts: Magic Johnson 11
Los Angeles leads series, 2–0

The Forum, Inglewood, California
Attendance: 15,298

May 4

Boxscore

Los Angeles Lakers 115, Dallas Mavericks 125
Scoring by quarter: 30–35, 23–33, 36–32, 26–25
Pts: Magic Johnson 24; Rebs: Bob McAdoo 8 Asts: Magic Johnson 14	Pts: Rolando Blackman 31; Rebs: Pat Cummings 14; Asts: Davis, Harper 6 each
Los Angeles leads series, 2–1

Reunion Arena, Dallas, Texas
Attendance: 17,007

May 6

Boxscore

Los Angeles Lakers 122, Dallas Mavericks 115 (OT)
Scoring by quarter: 34–30, 27–23, 29–26, 18–29, Overtime: 14–7
Pts: Kareem Abdul-Jabbar 33; Rebs: Johnson, Abdul-Jabbar 11 each Asts: Magic Johnson 16	Pts: Mark Aguirre 34; Rebs: Aguirre, Vincent 7 each Asts: Blackman, Aguirre 6 each
Los Angeles leads series, 3–1

Reunion Arena, Dallas, Texas
Attendance: 17,007
Referees: Jake O'Donnell, Ed Middleton, Hue Hollins (alternate)

- Pat Cummings hits the game-tying layup with 31 seconds left before Derek Harper made a mistake by dribbling out the clock thinking Dallas was ahead by one, when the score was actually tied.

May 8

Boxscore

Dallas Mavericks 99, Los Angeles Lakers 115
Scoring by quarter: 19–33, 25–29, 25–39, 30–14
Pts: Rolando Blackman 25; Rebs: Dale Ellis 10; Asts: Brad Davis 6	Pts: Mike McGee 27; Rebs: three players 6 each Asts: Magic Johnson 15
Los Angeles wins series, 4–1

The Forum, Inglewood, California
Attendance: 16,644

Regular-season series
Dallas won 3–2 in the regular-season series

November 5, 1983

Recap

Los Angeles Lakers 102, Dallas Mavericks 107

Reunion Arena, Dallas

November 9, 1983

Recap

Dallas Mavericks 106, Los Angeles Lakers 120

The Forum, Inglewood, California

December 2, 1983

Recap

Dallas Mavericks 133, Los Angeles Lakers 118

The Forum, Inglewood, California

March 9, 1984

Recap

Los Angeles Lakers 121, Dallas Mavericks 120 (2OT)

Reunion Arena, Dallas

April 13, 1984

Recap

Dallas Mavericks 104, Los Angeles Lakers 103

The Forum, Inglewood, California

This was the first playoff meeting between the Lakers and the Mavericks.

==== (2) Utah Jazz vs. (6) Phoenix Suns ====
April 29

Boxscore

Phoenix Suns 95, Utah Jazz 105
Scoring by quarter: 21–29, 30–30, 21–27, 23–19
Pts: Walter Davis 21; Rebs: James Edwards 8 Asts: Walter Davis 7	Pts: Adrian Dantley 36; Rebs: Thurl Bailey 13; Asts: Rickey Green 16
Utah leads series, 1–0

Salt Palace, Salt Lake City, Utah
Attendance: 12,403
Referees: Paul Mihalak, Wally Rooney

May 2

Boxscore

Phoenix Suns 102, Utah Jazz 97
Scoring by quarter: 25–30, 35–26, 20–17, 22–24
Pts: Walter Davis 28; Rebs: Maurice Lucas 15; Asts: Kyle Macy 7	Pts: Adrian Dantley 26; Rebs: Mark Eaton 9 Asts: Rickey Green 6
Series tied, 1–1

Salt Palace, Salt Lake City, Utah
Attendance: 12,689
Referees: Jess Kersey, Tommy Nunez

May 4

Boxscore

Utah Jazz 94, Phoenix Suns 106
Scoring by quarter: 21–26, 25–30, 18–33, 30–17
Pts: Adrian Dantley 31; Rebs: Mark Eaton 11; Asts: Rickey Green 4	Pts: Walter Davis 30; Rebs: Maurice Lucas 14; Asts: Kyle Macy 7
Phoenix leads series, 2–1

Arizona Veterans Memorial Coliseum, Phoenix, Arizona
Attendance: 14,660
Referees: Jack Madden, Jake O'Donnell

May 6

Boxscore

Utah Jazz 110, Phoenix Suns 111 (OT)
Scoring by quarter: 29–33, 22–22, 25–22, 27–26, Overtime: 7–8
Pts: Adrian Dantley 37; Rebs: Mark Eaton 12; Asts: Darrell Griffith 8	Pts: Walter Davis 32; Rebs: Alvan Adams 15; Asts: Maurice Lucas 6
Phoenix leads series, 3–1

Arizona Veterans Memorial Coliseum, Phoenix, Arizona
Attendance: 14,660
Referees: Hugh Evans, Mike Mathis, Joe Crawford (alternate)

- Walter Davis hits the game-tying 3 pointer with 3 seconds left to force OT.

May 8

Boxscore

Phoenix Suns 106, Utah Jazz 118
Scoring by quarter: 21–35, 29–35, 30–22, 26–26
Pts: Maurice Lucas 19; Rebs: Maurice Lucas 12; Asts: Macy, Westphal 6 each	Pts: Adrian Dantley 46; Rebs: Mark Eaton 11; Asts: Rickey Green 14
Phoenix leads series, 3–2

Salt Palace, Salt Lake City, Utah
Attendance: 12,560
Referees: Earl Strom, John Vanak

May 10

Boxscore

Utah Jazz 82, Phoenix Suns 102
Scoring by quarter: 16–27, 25–27, 24–26, 17–22
Pts: Adrian Dantley 23; Rebs: Mark Eaton 10; Asts: Rickey Green 6	Pts: Walter Davis 21; Rebs: Larry Nance 9 Asts: Macy, Davis 6 each
Phoenix wins series, 4–2

Arizona Veterans Memorial Coliseum, Phoenix, Arizona
Attendance: 14,660
Referees: Jess Kersey, Paul Mihalak

Regular-season series
Utah won 4–1 in the regular-season series

November 29, 1983

Recap

Phoenix Suns 110, Utah Jazz 114

Thomas & Mack Center, Paradise, Nevada

December 2, 1983

Recap

Utah Jazz 116, Phoenix Suns 113

Arizona Veterans Memorial Coliseum, Phoenix, Arizona

January 10, 1984

Recap

Phoenix Suns 98, Utah Jazz 107

Salt Palace Acord Arena, Salt Lake City

February 2, 1984

Recap

Phoenix Suns 95, Utah Jazz 116

Salt Palace Acord Arena, Salt Lake City

February 28, 1984

Recap

Utah Jazz 100, Phoenix Suns 113

Arizona Veterans Memorial Coliseum, Phoenix, Arizona

This was the first playoff meeting between the Suns and the Jazz.

== Conference finals ==
=== Eastern Conference finals ===
==== (1) Boston Celtics vs. (2) Milwaukee Bucks ====
May 15

Boxscore

Milwaukee Bucks 96, Boston Celtics 119
Scoring by quarter: 17–22, 25–32, 27–30, 27–35
Pts: Marques Johnson 18; Rebs: Bob Lanier 11; Asts: Marques Johnson 4	Pts: Larry Bird 24; Rebs: Kevin McHale 7 Asts: Gerald Henderson 7
Boston leads series, 1–0

Boston Garden, Boston, Massachusetts
Attendance: 14,890

May 17

Boxscore

Milwaukee Bucks 110, Boston Celtics 125
Scoring by quarter: 21–32, 27–35, 31–25, 31–33
Pts: Marques Johnson 29; Rebs: Sidney Moncrief 7 Asts: three players 4 each	Pts: Larry Bird 32; Rebs: Larry Bird 13; Asts: Larry Bird 7
Boston leads series, 2–0

Boston Garden, Boston, Massachusetts
Attendance: 14,890

May 19

Boxscore

Boston Celtics 109, Milwaukee Bucks 100
Scoring by quarter: 27–29, 23–34, 32–22, 27–15
Pts: Larry Bird 28; Rebs: Robert Parish 16; Asts: Larry Bird 6	Pts: Sidney Moncrief 22; Rebs: Paul Mokeski 12; Asts: Sidney Moncrief 6
Boston leads series, 3–0

MECCA Arena, Milwaukee, Wisconsin
Attendance: 11,052

May 21

Boxscore

Boston Celtics 113, Milwaukee Bucks 122
Scoring by quarter: 29–30, 17–31, 31–29, 36–32
Pts: Larry Bird 32; Rebs: Larry Bird 10; Asts: Larry Bird 8	Pts: Paul Pressey 22; Rebs: Mokeski, Lister 9 each Asts: Bob Lanier 8
Boston leads series, 3–1

MECCA Arena, Milwaukee, Wisconsin
Attendance: 11,052

May 23

Boxscore

Milwaukee Bucks 108, Boston Celtics 115
Scoring by quarter: 35–34, 17–28, 27–30, 29–23
Pts: Marques Johnson 24; Rebs: Moncrief, Lister 8 each Asts: Paul Pressey 4	Pts: Larry Bird 21; Rebs: Larry Bird 13; Asts: Bird, Maxwell 4 each
Boston wins series, 4–1

Boston Garden, Boston, Massachusetts
Attendance: 14,890

- Bob Lanier's final NBA game.

Regular-season series
Boston won 5–1 in the regular-season series

November 2, 1983

Recap

Milwaukee Bucks 105, Boston Celtics 119

Boston Garden, Boston

January 15, 1984

Recap

Boston Celtics 87, Milwaukee Bucks 106

MECCA Arena, Milwaukee

January 22, 1984

Recap

Milwaukee Bucks 98, Boston Celtics 109

Boston Garden, Boston

March 9, 1984

Recap

Boston Celtics 129, Milwaukee Bucks 128 (2OT)

MECCA Arena, Milwaukee

March 16, 1984

Recap

Milwaukee Bucks 99, Boston Celtics 109

Boston Garden, Boston

April 10, 1984

Recap

Boston Celtics 96, Milwaukee Bucks 95

MECCA Arena, Milwaukee

This was the third playoff meeting between these two teams, with each team winning one series apiece.

Previous playoff series
Tied 1–1 in all-time playoff series

1974

Boston Celtics 4, Milwaukee Bucks 3

1974 NBA Finals

1983

Boston Celtics 0, Milwaukee Bucks 4

1983 Eastern Conference Semifinals

=== Western Conference finals ===
==== (1) Los Angeles Lakers vs. (6) Phoenix Suns ====
May 12

Boxscore

Phoenix Suns 94, Los Angeles Lakers 110
Scoring by quarter: 32–29, 20–28, 16–21, 26–32
Pts: Walter Davis 24; Rebs: Larry Nance 15; Asts: Kyle Macy 10	Pts: Bob McAdoo 20; Rebs: Kareem Abdul-Jabbar 10; Asts: Michael Cooper 10
Los Angeles leads series, 1–0

The Forum, Inglewood, California
Attendance: 12,825

May 15

Boxscore

Phoenix Suns 102, Los Angeles Lakers 118
Scoring by quarter: 28–26, 18–30, 30–31, 26–31
Pts: Larry Nance 29; Rebs: Larry Nance 9 Asts: Walter Davis 8	Pts: Kareem Abdul-Jabbar 21; Rebs: Kareem Abdul-Jabbar 10; Asts: Magic Johnson 24
Los Angeles leads series, 2–0

The Forum, Inglewood, California
Attendance: 16,578

- Magic Johnson's 24 assists sets an NBA playoff record for assists in a game.

May 18

Boxscore

Los Angeles Lakers 127, Phoenix Suns 135 (OT)
Scoring by quarter: 31–42, 33–20, 27–29, 28–28, Overtime: 8–16
Pts: Kareem Abdul-Jabbar 31; Rebs: three players 8 each Asts: Magic Johnson 13	Pts: Walter Davis 34; Rebs: Maurice Lucas 17; Asts: Kyle Macy 6
Los Angeles leads series, 2–1

Arizona Veterans Memorial Coliseum, Phoenix, Arizona
Attendance: 14,660

- Kareem Abdul-Jabbar hits the game-tying sky-hook with 22 seconds left to force OT.

May 20

Boxscore

Los Angeles Lakers 126, Phoenix Suns 115
Scoring by quarter: 37–36, 32–22, 30–29, 27–28
Pts: Kareem Abdul-Jabbar 31; Rebs: three players 7 each Asts: Magic Johnson 15	Pts: Larry Nance 27; Rebs: Maurice Lucas 10; Asts: Walter Davis 7
Los Angeles leads series, 3–1

Arizona Veterans Memorial Coliseum, Phoenix, Arizona
Attendance: 14,660

May 23

Boxscore

Phoenix Suns 126, Los Angeles Lakers 121
Scoring by quarter: 33–31, 38–30, 29–26, 26–34
Pts: Walter Davis 27; Rebs: Larry Nance 13; Asts: Kyle Macy 12	Pts: Kareem Abdul-Jabbar 28; Rebs: Bob McAdoo 8 Asts: Magic Johnson 13
Los Angeles leads series, 3–2

The Forum, Inglewood, California
Attendance: 16,848
Referees: Paul Mihalak, Earl Strom

May 25

Boxscore

Los Angeles Lakers 99, Phoenix Suns 97
Scoring by quarter: 26–25, 22–30, 29–23, 22–19
Pts: James Worthy 22; Rebs: Magic Johnson 11; Asts: Magic Johnson 13	Pts: Walter Davis 26; Rebs: Maurice Lucas 13; Asts: Kyle Macy 8
Los Angeles wins series, 4–2

Arizona Veterans Memorial Coliseum, Phoenix, Arizona
Attendance: 14,660

- Paul Westphal's final NBA game.

Regular-season series
Tied 3–3 in the regular-season series

November 11, 1983

Recap

Phoenix Suns 105, Los Angeles Lakers 119

The Forum, Inglewood, California

December 15, 1983

Recap

Los Angeles Lakers 104, Phoenix Suns 114

Arizona Veterans Memorial Coliseum, Phoenix, Arizona

January 19, 1984

Recap

Los Angeles Lakers 123, Phoenix Suns 138

Arizona Veterans Memorial Coliseum, Phoenix, Arizona

January 24, 1984

Recap

Phoenix Suns 110, Los Angeles Lakers 116

The Forum, Inglewood, California

March 31, 1984

Recap

Los Angeles Lakers 119, Phoenix Suns 97

Arizona Veterans Memorial Coliseum, Phoenix, Arizona

April 15, 1984

Recap

Phoenix Suns 123, Los Angeles Lakers 114

The Forum, Inglewood, California

This was the fourth playoff meeting between these two teams, with the Lakers winning the first three meetings.

Previous playoff series
Los Angeles leads 3–0 in all-time playoff series

1970

Los Angeles Lakers 4, Phoenix Suns 3

1970 Western Division Semifinals

1980

Los Angeles Lakers 4, Phoenix Suns 1

1980 Western Conference Semifinals

1982

Los Angeles Lakers 4, Phoenix Suns 0

1982 Western Conference Semifinals

== NBA Finals: (E1) Boston Celtics vs. (W1) Los Angeles Lakers ==
May 27

Boxscore

Los Angeles Lakers 115, Boston Celtics 109
Scoring by quarter: 34–22, 31–30, 27–36, 23–21
Pts: Kareem Abdul-Jabbar 32; Rebs: Kareem Abdul-Jabbar 8 Asts: Magic Johnson 10	Pts: Kevin McHale 25; Rebs: Larry Bird 14; Asts: Larry Bird 5
Los Angeles leads series, 1–0

Boston Garden, Boston, Massachusetts
Attendance: 14,890
Referees: Hugh Evans, John Vanak

May 31

Boxscore

Los Angeles Lakers 121, Boston Celtics 124 (OT)
Scoring by quarter: 26–36, 33–25, 28–29, 26–23, Overtime: 8–11
Pts: James Worthy 29; Rebs: Magic Johnson 10; Asts: Magic Johnson 10	Pts: Larry Bird 27; Rebs: Larry Bird 13; Asts: Ainge, Henderson 5 each
Series tied, 1–1

Boston Garden, Boston, Massachusetts
Attendance: 14,890
Referees: Jack Madden, Jake O'Donnell, Paul Mihalak (alternate)

- Gerald Henderson stole a James Worthy pass and made a layup to tie the game with 13 seconds left and eventually force OT; Scott Wedman hits the clutch shot with 14 seconds left in OT.

June 3

Boxscore

Boston Celtics 104, Los Angeles Lakers 137
Scoring by quarter: 26–29, 20–28, 33–47, 25–33
Pts: Larry Bird 30; Rebs: Robert Parish 12; Asts: Cedric Maxwell 5	Pts: Kareem Abdul-Jabbar 24; Rebs: Magic Johnson 11; Asts: Magic Johnson 21
Los Angeles leads series, 2–1

The Forum, Inglewood, California
Attendance: 17,505
Referees: Paul Mihalak, Earl Strom

- Magic Johnson 21 assists sets an NBA Finals record for assists in a game.

June 6

Boxscore

Boston Celtics 129, Los Angeles Lakers 125 (OT)
Scoring by quarter: 32–33, 26–35, 30–22, 25–23, Overtime: 16–12
Pts: Larry Bird 29; Rebs: Larry Bird 21; Asts: Dennis Johnson 14	Pts: Kareem Abdul-Jabbar 32; Rebs: Magic Johnson 11; Asts: Magic Johnson 17
Series tied, 2–2

The Forum, Inglewood, California
Attendance: 17,505
Referees: Darell Garretson, Jess Kersey, Earl Strom (alternate)

- Kevin McHale clotheslined Kurt Rambis; Larry Bird hits the game-tying free throws with 16 seconds left in regulation to force OT, then hits the clutch jumper over Magic Johnson with 16 seconds left in OT after Magic misses two clutch free throws that would give the Lakers the lead with 34 seconds left in OT; M. L. Carr steals James Worthy's inbound pass and dunks it with 6 seconds left in OT.

June 8

Boxscore

Los Angeles Lakers 103, Boston Celtics 121
Scoring by quarter: 26–26, 27–29, 24–33, 26–33
Pts: James Worthy 22; Rebs: Kurt Rambis 9 Asts: Magic Johnson 13	Pts: Larry Bird 34; Rebs: Larry Bird 17; Asts: Gerald Henderson 9
Boston leads series, 3–2

Boston Garden, Boston, Massachusetts
Attendance: 14,890
Referees: Hugh Evans, Earl Strom, John Vanak (alternate)

- This game was known as the "Heat Game", as the temperature inside the un-air conditioned Boston Garden was reputed to be 97 °F (36 °C).

June 10

Boxscore

Boston Celtics 108, Los Angeles Lakers 119
Scoring by quarter: 33–29, 32–30, 22–24, 21–36
Pts: Larry Bird 28; Rebs: Larry Bird 14; Asts: Larry Bird 8	Pts: Kareem Abdul-Jabbar 30; Rebs: Kareem Abdul-Jabbar 10; Asts: Magic Johnson 10
Series tied, 3–3

The Forum, Inglewood, California
Attendance: 17,505
Referees: Jack Madden, Jake O'Donnell

June 12

Boxscore

Los Angeles Lakers 102, Boston Celtics 111
Scoring by quarter: 30–30, 22–28, 26–33, 24–20
Pts: James Worthy 21; Rebs: Kurt Rambis 9 Asts: Magic Johnson 15	Pts: Cedric Maxwell 24; Rebs: Robert Parish 16; Asts: Cedric Maxwell 8
Boston wins series, 4–3

Boston Garden, Boston, Massachusetts
Attendance: 14,890
Referees: Darell Garretson, Earl Strom, Jake O'Donnell (alternate)

Regular-season series
Los Angeles won 2–0 in the regular-season series

February 8, 1984

Recap

Los Angeles Lakers 111, Boston Celtics 109

Boston Garden, Boston

February 24, 1984

Recap

Boston Celtics 108, Los Angeles Lakers 116

The Forum, Inglewood, California

This was the eighth playoff meeting between these two teams, with the Celtics winning the first seven meetings.

Previous playoff series
Boston leads 7–0 in all-time playoff series

1959

Boston Celtics 4, Minneapolis Lakers 0

1959 NBA Finals

1962

Boston Celtics 4, Los Angeles Lakers 3

1962 NBA Finals

1963

Boston Celtics 4, Los Angeles Lakers 2

1963 NBA Finals

1965

Boston Celtics 4, Los Angeles Lakers 1

1965 NBA Finals

1966

Boston Celtics 4, Los Angeles Lakers 3

1966 NBA Finals

1968

Boston Celtics 4, Los Angeles Lakers 2

1968 NBA Finals

1969

Boston Celtics 4, Los Angeles Lakers 3

1969 NBA Finals
