= 2001 MAAC men's basketball tournament =

- Classification: Division I
- Season: 2000–01
- Teams: 10
- Site: Marine Midland Arena; Buffalo, New York
- Champions: Iona (6th title)
- Winning coach: Jeff Ruland (2nd title)
- MVP: Nakiea Miller (Iona)

2000–01 MAAC men's basketball standings
	Conf.				Overall
Team	W		L	PCT	W		L	PCT
Iona †	12	–	6	.667	22	–	11	.667
Niagara	12	–	6	.667	15	–	13	.536
Siena	12	–	6	.667	20	–	11	.645
Marist	11	–	7	.611	17	–	13	.567
Rider	11	–	7	.611	16	–	12	.571
Manhattan	11	–	7	.611	14	–	15	.483
Canisius	9	–	9	.500	20	–	11	.645
Fairfield	8	–	10	.444	12	–	16	.429
Loyola (MD)	2	–	16	.111	6	–	23	.207
Saint Peter's	2	–	16	.111	4	–	24	.143
† 2001 MAAC tournament winner Rankings from AP Poll

The 2001 MAAC men's basketball tournament was held March 2–5, 2001 at Marine Midland Arena in Buffalo, New York.

Top-seeded Iona defeated Canisius in the championship game, 74–67, to win their sixth MAAC men's basketball tournament.

The Gaels received an automatic bid to the 2001 NCAA tournament.

== Format ==
All ten of the conference's members participated in the tournament field. They were seeded based on regular season conference records.

== Bracket ==
First round Friday, March 2
8	Fairfield	58
9	Loyola (MD)	60
7	Canisius	84
10	Saint Peter's	72

Quarterfinals; Saturday, March 3
1	Iona	64
9	Loyola (MD)	52
4	Marist	70
5	Rider	58
2	Niagara	70
7	Canisius	72
3	Siena	79
6	Manhattan	76

Semifinals; Sunday, March 4
1	Iona	75
4	Marist	71
7	Canisius	76
3	Siena	64

Championship; Monday, March 5
1	Iona	74
7	Canisius	67
