= 2000–01 Iona Gaels men's basketball team =

American college basketball season

2000–01 Iona Gaels men's basketball
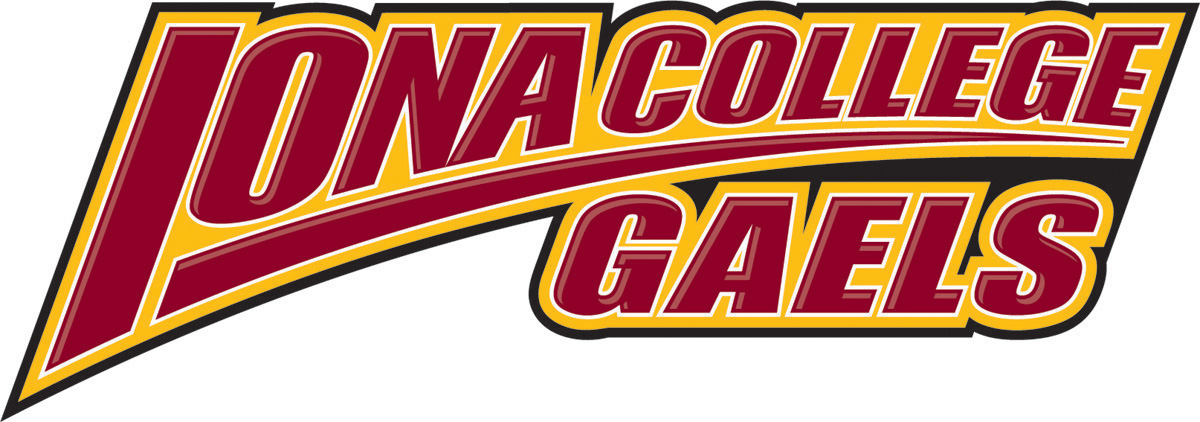

MAAC tournament champions

NCAA tournament, First Round
- Conference: Metro Atlantic Athletic Conference
- Record: 22–11 (12–6 MAAC)
- Head coach: Jeff Ruland (3rd season)
- Home arena: Hynes Athletic Center

2000–01 MAAC men's basketball standings
	Conf.				Overall
Team	W		L	PCT	W		L	PCT
Iona †	12	–	6	.667	22	–	11	.667
Niagara	12	–	6	.667	15	–	13	.536
Siena	12	–	6	.667	20	–	11	.645
Marist	11	–	7	.611	17	–	13	.567
Rider	11	–	7	.611	16	–	12	.571
Manhattan	11	–	7	.611	14	–	15	.483
Canisius	9	–	9	.500	20	–	11	.645
Fairfield	8	–	10	.444	12	–	16	.429
Loyola (MD)	2	–	16	.111	6	–	23	.207
Saint Peter's	2	–	16	.111	4	–	24	.143
† 2001 MAAC tournament winner Rankings from AP Poll

The 2000–01 Iona Gaels men's basketball team represented Iona College during the 2000–01 NCAA Division I men's basketball season. The Gaels, led third-year by head coach Jeff Ruland, played their home games at the Hynes Athletic Center and were members of the Metro Atlantic Athletic Conference. The Gaels finished first in the MAAC regular season standings, and would go on to win the MAAC Basketball tournament to receive an automatic bid to the 2001 NCAA tournament. As the No. 14 seed in the Midwest region, the Gaels lost to No. 3 seed Ole Miss in the opening round.

== Roster ==
2000–01 Iona Gaels men's basketball team
Players
Coaches

Pos.	#	Name	Height	Weight	Year	Hometown
G	32	Earl Johnson	6 ft 0 in (1.83 m)	—	Sr	Port Chester, New York
F/C	43	Nakiea Miller	6 ft 9 in (2.06 m)	—	Sr	Stratford, Connecticut

Head coach

- Jeff Ruland

Assistant coach(es)

Legend

- (C) Team captain
- (S) Suspended
- (I) Ineligible
- (W) Walk-on
- Injured
- Current redshirt

Roster

== Schedule and results ==
Date time, TV	Rank^{#}	Opponent^{#}	Result	Record	Site (attendance) city, state
Regular season
MAAC tournament
NCAA tournament
Mar 16, 2001*	(14 MW)	vs. (3 MW) No. 14 Ole Miss; First round	L 70–72	22–11	Kemper Arena; Kansas City, Missouri
*Non-conference game. ^{#}Rankings from AP Poll. (#) Tournament seedings in parentheses. MW=Midwest. All times are in Eastern Time.
