= 2005–06 Iona Gaels men's basketball team =

American college basketball season

2005–06 Iona Gaels men's basketball
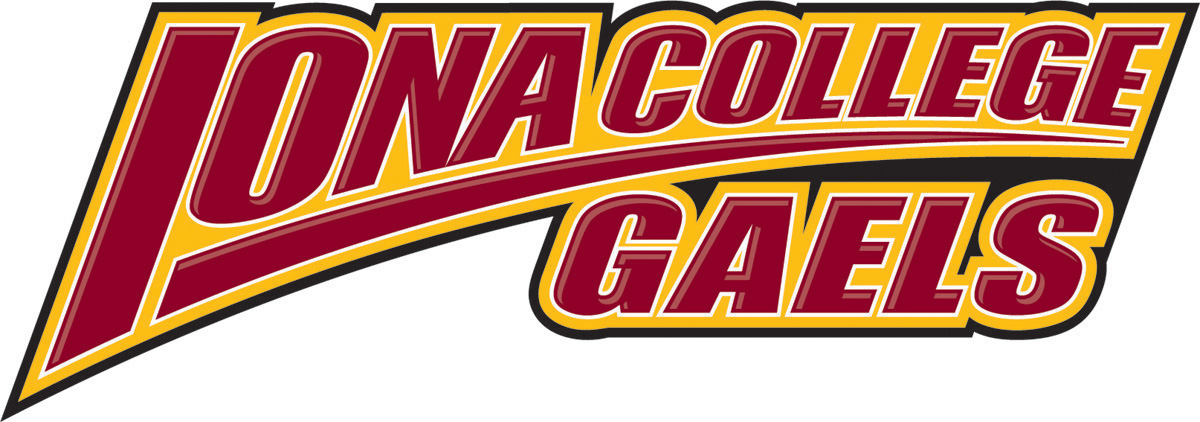

MAAC tournament champions

NCAA tournament, First round
- Conference: Metro Atlantic Athletic Conference
- Record: 23–8 (13–5 MAAC)
- Head coach: Jeff Ruland (8th season)
- Home arena: Hynes Athletic Center

2005–06 MAAC men's basketball standings
	Conf.				Overall
Team	W		L	PCT	W		L	PCT
Manhattan	14	–	4	.778	20	–	11	.645
Iona †	13	–	5	.722	23	–	8	.742
Marist	12	–	6	.667	19	–	10	.655
Siena	10	–	8	.556	15	–	13	.536
Saint Peter's	9	–	9	.500	17	–	15	.531
Loyola (MD)	8	–	10	.444	15	–	13	.536
Niagara	7	–	11	.389	11	–	18	.379
Fairfield	7	–	11	.389	9	–	19	.321
Canisius	6	–	12	.333	9	–	20	.310
Rider	4	–	14	.222	8	–	20	.286
† 2006 MAAC tournament winner Rankings from AP Poll

The 2005–06 Iona Gaels men's basketball team represented Iona College during the 2005–06 NCAA Division I men's basketball season. The Gaels, led 8th-year by head coach Jeff Ruland, played their home games at the Hynes Athletic Center and were members of the Metro Atlantic Athletic Conference. The Gaels finished second in the MAAC regular season standings, and would go on to win the MAAC Basketball tournament to receive an automatic bid to the 2006 NCAA tournament. As the No. 13 seed in the South region, the Gaels lost to No. 4 seed and eventual Final Four participant LSU in the opening round.

== Roster ==
2005–06 Iona Gaels men's basketball team
Players	Coaches
Pos. / # / Name / Height / Weight / Year / Hometown; G / 15 / Steve Burtt / 6 ft 1 in (1.85 m) / 190 lb (86 kg) / Sr / New York, New York	Head coach: Jeff Ruland; Assistant coach(es) Legend: (C) Team captain; (S) Suspended; (I) Ineligible; (W) Walk-on; Injured; Current redshirt; Roster

== Schedule and results ==
Date time, TV	Rank^{#}	Opponent^{#}	Result	Record	Site (attendance) city, state
Regular season
MAAC tournament
NCAA tournament
Mar 16, 2006*	(13 S)	vs. (4 S) No. 19 LSU; First round	L 64–80	23–8	Jacksonville Veteran's Memorial Arena; Jacksonville, Florida
*Non-conference game. ^{#}Rankings from AP Poll. (#) Tournament seedings in parentheses. S=South. All times are in Eastern Time.
