= Jeff Ruland =

American basketball player and coach (born 1958)

Personal information
- Born: December 16, 1958 (age 67) Bay Shore, New York, U.S.
- Listed height: 6 ft 10 in (2.08 m)
- Listed weight: 240 lb (109 kg)

Career information
- High school: Sachem (Lake Ronkonkoma, New York)
- College: Iona (1977–1980)
- NBA draft: 1980: 2nd round, 25th overall pick
- Drafted by: Golden State Warriors
- Playing career: 1980–1987, 1992–1993
- Position: Center
- Number: 43, 50
- Coaching career: 1993–2013

Career history

Playing
- 1980–1981: FC Barcelona
- 1981–1986: Washington Bullets
- 1986–1987; 1992: Philadelphia 76ers
- 1992–1993: Detroit Pistons

Coaching
- 1993–1994: Philadelphia 76ers (assistant)
- 1995–1998: Iona (assistant)
- 1998–2007: Iona
- 2007–2008: Albuquerque Thunderbirds
- 2008–2009: Philadelphia 76ers (assistant)
- 2009–2013: UDC

Career highlights
- As player: 2× NBA All-Star (1984, 1985); NBA All-Rookie First Team (1982); Liga ACB champion (1981); Copa del Rey winner (1981); Third-team All-American – NABC (1980); Haggerty Award winner (1980); Second-team Parade All-American (1977); McDonald's All-American (1977); As head coach: 3× MAAC tournament champion (2000, 2001, 2006); MAAC regular season champion (2001)

Career NBA playing statistics
- Points: 5,763 (17.4 ppg)
- Rebounds: 3,378 (10.2 rpg)
- Assists: 1,002 (3.0 apg)
- Stats at NBA.com
- Stats at Basketball Reference

Career coaching record
- College: 184–196 (.484)
- Record at Basketball Reference
Medals
Men's basketball
Representing the United States
Universiade
| Gold medal – first place | 1979 Mexico City | Men's basketball |

Jeffrey George Ruland (born December 16, 1958) is an American former professional basketball player and coach, best known for his tenure as a player in the National Basketball Association (NBA) which saw him selected to two All-Star games. After playing college basketball for Iona, he started his professional career with FC Barcelona in the Liga ACB.

Following his playing career, he coached the Iona Gaels men's basketball team and the UDC Firebirds men's college basketball team.

== Early life and collegiate career ==
A 6-foot-11-inch (2.11 m), 280 lb center, Ruland went to Sachem High School in Suffolk County, New York. He was named to the inaugural McDonald's All-American team, which played in the 1977 Capital Classic. He attended Iona College on a basketball scholarship and played for coach Jim Valvano before Valvano left for North Carolina State University. Ruland played on the Gaels' 1979–1980 team that beat eventual national champion Louisville 77–60 at Madison Square Garden during the regular season and compiled a 29–5 record en route to a number 19 national ranking, the best in the school's history. However, Ruland was found in violation of NCAA rules by hiring an agent, Paul Corvino, at International Management Inc. and was ruled ineligible to play his senior year at Iona.

== Professional career ==
=== FC Barcelona ===
Ruland was selected by the Golden State Warriors in the 1980 NBA draft with the 25th overall pick but was traded to the Washington Bullets for a second round pick in the following year's draft. Due to not being likely to get the playing time he wanted with the crowded Bullets frontcourt, he opted to sign with FC Barcelona of the Liga ACB instead for the 1980–81 season although he left the team before the end of the season.

=== Washington Bullets (1981–1986) ===
Joining the Bullets for the 1981–82 season, Ruland played behind 32-year-old Spencer Haywood but had greater per-game averages than him during the same number of minutes. Seeing time at both forward and center, Ruland showed muscle at both ends of the floor and an accurate jump shot good from as far as 20 feet. A 56% shooter from the floor, Ruland registered as having the 10th-best field goal percentage in the league. In his league playoff debut, Ruland outshined teammate and fellow Beef Brother Rick Mahorn with 20 rebounds and 18 points as a reserve. That postseason, the Bullets swept the New Jersey Nets, before losing to the Boston Celtics in the Eastern Conference Semifinals. Ruland's playoff averages were 17 points and 9.4 rebounds per game off the bench.

Ruland took over the starting power forward spot for the 1982–83 season, but continued to back up at center for Washington. His 55% shooting and 11 rebounds per game ranked him, respectively, 10th and 8th place league-wide. Leading coach Gene Shue's balanced team in scoring as well, Ruland earned a spot in the NBA All-Star Game that season. On March 27th, 1983, Ruland recorded one of the most unique lines in the league, when he posted figures of 27 points, 14 rebounds, seven assists, four steals, and three blocked shots. Despite finishing with the same record as the season before, the Bullets did not make the playoffs.

In the 1983–84 season, Ruland's averages rose to 22 points and four assists per game on a Bullets team that had all five starters score 14 or more points several times on the season. On November 25 of that season, Ruland scored a career-high 38 points, and also grabbed 16 rebounds, in a win over the Detroit Pistons. By the end of the season, Ruland was third in the NBA in total rebounds and fifth in shooting percentage from the floor. The Bullets returned to the playoffs and again lost to Boston. In the series, Ruland averaged 24 points, 13 rebounds, 8 assists, 52% from the floor and 81% from the foul line against the eventual NBA champions.

For the 1984–85 season, Ruland was moved to center. His stats dipped slightly. He remained among the rebounding and shooting leaders, but suffered a broken bone in his foot and played just 37 games. Ruland played through the pain in the playoffs, but the Bullets lost to the Philadelphia 76ers to end a disappointing season.

The brittle feet, though, like Bill Walton before him, were now a condition. He played 30 games during the 1985–86 NBA season, usually in considerable pain. So in most of regular season as well as in the playoffs, the Bullets opted to start towering Manute Bol at center. Ruland added 14 points and five assists per game off the bench, but the Bullets fell to Philadelphia for the second consecutive season.

While on the Bullets, Ruland and teammate Rick Mahorn were dubbed the "Beef Brothers" for their physicality and tough play when paired together on the court.

As of the 2023–24 season, Ruland has the highest field goal percentage (minimum 2000 field goals made) by any player in Washington Wizards history, at 56.4%.

=== Philadelphia 76ers (1986–1987) ===
Traded to Philadelphia for Moses Malone the following season, Ruland played in five games before getting injured and subsequently retiring.

=== Second stint with 76ers (1992) ===
Five years later Ruland made a comeback with the Sixers, playing in 13 games during the 1991–92 NBA season before sustaining an Achilles injury involving a luggage cart which was allegedly slammed into his leg by a Boston Celtics employee outside Boston Garden.

=== Detroit Pistons (1992–1993) ===
He managed to play an additional 11 games with the Detroit Pistons the following season before retiring for good in January 1993.

== National team career ==
In 1979, Ruland played for the United States national team at the 1979 Summer Spartakiad games. In September, he helped Team USA win gold at the 1979 Summer Universiade.

== Coaching career ==
After his playing days, Ruland became an assistant coach under the Sixers' Fred Carter during the 1993–94 NBA season. He then returned to coach at his alma mater. He was fired from Iona on March 21, 2007, after a 2–28 record during the 2006–2007 season. Nevertheless, during his tenure as head coach, he guided the Gaels to three 20-win seasons, three MAAC Championships and three NCAA Tournament appearances. Recruiting and injuries were blamed for the team's abysmal record during his final season. A factor behind the 2–28 season was that the administration fired Ruland's assistant coaches. Ruland could not recruit for that season. Ruland's termination as a head coach came from Iona College president James Liguori while he was on a cruise.

On July 16, 2007, Ruland was hired to replace Michael Cooper as the head coach of the NBA D-League's Albuquerque Thunderbirds. After coaching the Thunderbirds for the 2007–08 season, Ruland was hired as an assistant coach for the Philadelphia 76ers on August 23, 2008. New 76ers head Coach Eddie Jordan decided not to retain Ruland for the 2009–10 season.

On August 18, 2009, Ruland announced that he would be the new men's basketball head coach at the University of the District of Columbia. After a late September hiring and the first season with only one win, his third year saw a 22-win season. He was fired in 2013.

In 2015, Ruland was hired as an advance scout for the Washington Wizards.

== NBA career statistics ==
Legend
| GP | Games played | GS | Games started | MPG | Minutes per game |
| FG% | Field goal percentage | 3P% | 3-point field goal percentage | FT% | Free throw percentage |
| RPG | Rebounds per game | APG | Assists per game | SPG | Steals per game |
| BPG | Blocks per game | PPG | Points per game | **Bold** | Career high |
| * | Led the league |

=== Regular season ===
| Year | Team | GP | GS | MPG | FG% | 3P% | FT% | RPG | APG | SPG | BPG | PPG |
|---|---|---|---|---|---|---|---|---|---|---|---|---|
| 1981–82 | Washington | **82** | 0 | 27.0 | .561 | **.333** | **.752** | 9.3 | 1.6 | .5 | .7 | 14.4 |
| 1982–83 | Washington | 79 | 47 | 36.2 | .552 | **.333** | .689 | 11.0 | 3.0 | **.9** | **1.0** | 19.4 |
| 1983–84 | Washington | 75 | **75** | **41.1*** | .579 | .143 | .733 | **12.3** | 3.9 | **.9** | **1.0** | **22.2** |
| 1984–85 | Washington | 37 | 36 | 38.8 | .569 | .000 | .685 | 11.1 | 4.4 | .8 | .7 | 18.9 |
| 1985–86 | Washington | 30 | 24 | 37.1 | .554 | .000 | .725 | 10.7 | **5.3** | .8 | .8 | 19.0 |
| 1986–87 | Philadelphia | 5 | 2 | 23.2 | **.679** | – | .750 | 5.6 | 2.0 | .0 | .8 | 9.4 |
| 1991–92 | Philadelphia | 13 | 5 | 16.1 | .526 | – | .688 | 3.6 | .4 | .5 | .3 | 3.9 |
| 1992–93 | Detroit | 11 | 0 | 5.0 | .455 | – | .500 | 1.6 | .2 | .2 | .0 | 1.1 |
| Career | | 332 | 189 | 33.4 | .564 | .158 | .718 | 10.2 | 3.0 | .8 | .8 | 17.4 |
| All-Star | | 1 | 0 | 13.0 | .667 | — | 1.000 | 4.0 | 2.0 | 1.0 | .0 | 6.0 |

=== Playoffs ===
| Year | Team | GP | GS | MPG | FG% | 3P% | FT% | RPG | APG | SPG | BPG | PPG |
|---|---|---|---|---|---|---|---|---|---|---|---|---|
| 1982 | Washington | **7** | — | 33.9 | .481 | .000 | .768 | 9.4 | .7 | .4 | .6 | 17.0 |
| 1984 | Washington | 4 | — | **46.8** | .521 | .000 | .815 | **12.8** | **7.8** | .5 | .8 | **24.0** |
| 1985 | Washington | 4 | 3 | 40.5 | **.596** | .000 | .700 | 8.5 | 5.3 | **2.3** | **1.0** | 17.5 |
| 1986 | Washington | 2 | 0 | 27.0 | .500 | — | **.824** | 6.0 | 5.0 | .0 | **1.0** | 14.0 |
| Career | | 17 | 3 | 37.6 | .521 | .000 | .775 | 9.6 | 3.9 | .8 | .8 | 18.4 |

== Head coaching record ==
Record table
| Season | Team | Overall | Conference | Standing | Postseason |
|---|---|---|---|---|---|
Iona Gaels (Metro Atlantic Athletic Conference) (1998–2007)
| 1998–99 | Iona | 16–14 | 12–6 | 2nd | |
| 1999–00 | Iona | 20–11 | 13–5 | 2nd | NCAA Division I First Round |
| 2000–01 | Iona | 22–11 | 12–6 | T–1st | NCAA Division I First Round |
| 2001–02 | Iona | 13–17 | 8–8 | 5th | |
| 2002–03 | Iona | 17–12 | 11–7 | 5th | |
| 2003–04 | Iona | 11–18 | 8–10 | 7th | |
| 2004–05 | Iona | 15–16 | 9–9 | 5th | |
| 2005–06 | Iona | 23–8 | 13–5 | 2nd | NCAA Division I First Round |
| 2006–07 | Iona | 2–28 | 1–17 | 10th | |
| Iona: | | 144–135 (.516) | | | |
UDC Firebirds (East Coast Conference) (2009–2013)
| 2009–10 | UDC | 1–20 | | | |
| 2010–11 | UDC | 11–15 | | | |
| 2011–12 | UDC | 22–6 | | | |
| 2012–13 | UDC | 6–20 | | | |
| UDC: | | 40–61 (.396) | | | |
| Total: | | 184–196 (.484) | | | |
National champion Postseason invitational champion Conference regular season champion Conference regular season and conference tournament champion Division regular season champion Division regular season and conference tournament champion Conference tournament champion

== See also ==
- List of NBA career field goal percentage leaders
