= 2006 MAAC men's basketball tournament =

- Classification: Division I
- Season: 2005–06
- Teams: 10
- Site: Pepsi Arena; Albany, New York
- Champions: Iona (7th title)
- Winning coach: Jeff Ruland (3rd title)
- MVP: Steve Burtt Jr. (Iona)

2005–06 MAAC men's basketball standings
	Conf.				Overall
Team	W		L	PCT	W		L	PCT
Manhattan	14	–	4	.778	20	–	11	.645
Iona †	13	–	5	.722	23	–	8	.742
Marist	12	–	6	.667	19	–	10	.655
Siena	10	–	8	.556	15	–	13	.536
Saint Peter's	9	–	9	.500	17	–	15	.531
Loyola (MD)	8	–	10	.444	15	–	13	.536
Niagara	7	–	11	.389	11	–	18	.379
Fairfield	7	–	11	.389	9	–	19	.321
Canisius	6	–	12	.333	9	–	20	.310
Rider	4	–	14	.222	8	–	20	.286
† 2006 MAAC tournament winner Rankings from AP Poll

The 2006 MAAC men's basketball tournament was held March 3–6 at Pepsi Arena in Albany, New York.

Second-seeded Iona defeated Saint Peter's in the championship game, 80–61, to win their seventh MAAC men's basketball tournament.

The Gaels received an automatic bid to the 2006 NCAA tournament.

== Format ==
All ten of the conference's members participated in the tournament field. They were seeded based on regular season conference records.

As the regular-season champion, top seed Manhattan received a bye to the semifinals.

== Bracket ==
First round Friday, March 3
March 3
(5) Saint Peter's	80
(10) Rider	51
March 3
(7) Niagara	84
(8) Fairfield	77
March 3
(6) Loyola (MD)	72
(9) Canisius	74

Quarterfinals; Saturday, March 4
March 4
(4) Siena	62
(5) Saint Peter's	63
March 4
(2) Iona	80
(7) Niagara	54
March 4
(3) Marist	68
(9) Canisius	62

Semifinals; Sunday, March 5
March 5
(1) Manhattan	74
(5) Saint Peter's	84
March 5
(2) Iona	100
(3) Marist	84

Final; Monday, March 6
March 6
(5) Saint Peter's	61
(2) Iona	80
